= Athletics at the 2020 Summer Olympics – Men's marathon =

Men's marathon at the Games of the XXXII Olympiad
- Olympic Athletics
- Venue: Sapporo
- Date: 8 August 2021
- Competitors: 106 from 46 nations
- Winning time: 2:08:38

Medalists
1st place, gold medalist(s)		Eliud Kipchoge	Kenya
2nd place, silver medalist(s)		Abdi Nageeye	Netherlands
3rd place, bronze medalist(s)		Bashir Abdi	Belgium

Official Video Highlights

The men's marathon event at the 2020 Summer Olympics started at 07:00 on 8 August 2021 in Sapporo, Japan. 106 athletes from 46 nations competed. The previous Olympic champion, Kenyan Eliud Kipchoge, successfully defended his title, with Dutch and Belgian athletes Abdi Nageeye and Bashir Abdi gaining silver and bronze, respectively. Kipchoge was the third man to repeat as Olympic marathon champion, after Abebe Bikila and Waldemar Cierpinski. The Netherlands and Belgium earned their first men's marathon medals since 1980 and 1976, respectively.

The race was moved north, from Tokyo to Sapporo, because the latter is on average 4 °C (7 °F) cooler in August, as decided in 2019 by the IOC. Sapporo recorded 26.0 °C (78.8 °F) at 07:00 when the race started, not much different from Tokyo The gifts were presented by David Katz, United States; World Athletics Competition Commission Member.

== Summary ==
Before the start of the race, four athletes were introduced and took their positions on the start line, host nation Japanese champion Suguru Osako, Rio bronze medalist Galen Rupp, 2019 World Champion Lelisa Desisa and Rio gold medalist, world record holder Eliud Kipchoge, honored with the applause of his competitors. 102 others then toed the line with them. While some fell off the back from the start, the lead group filled the width of the street. About two kilometres into the race, the first leader, Jeison Suárez, began to assert himself. Suárez stayed on the front for the next 22 kilometres, joined by a succession of other frontrunners; Yang Shaohui, Amanal Petros, Mohamed Reda El Aaraby, Stephen Mokoka and Daniel Ferreira do Nascimento all under the watchful eye of Kipchoge, his Kenyan teammates Lawrence Cherono and Amos Kipruto, Desisa and Rupp.

A pack of over fifty at 5,000 metres dwindled to about twenty by the half way mark as other notable runners fell off the back, with many dropping out. Going in to the 25,000 meter mark, Kipchoge upped the pace. The pack became a string of runners trying to chase, led by the Kenyans and Rupp. At 28,000 metres Kipchoge attempted a break but was caught shortly after. Just after the 30,000 meter mark, he attempted another break, this time staying well ahead of the other competitors, eventually building a 27 second lead over the chase pack that had dwindled to Cherono, Ayad Lamdassem and Bashir Abdi with Abdi Nageeye hanging on a few seconds later. With Cherono at the point over the next 5,000 metres, the remaining foursome congealed into a pack, each trying to figure a tactic to take silver as Kipchoge pulled away into the distance. Coming from 30 seconds back of the group, Osako was rapidly making up ground. With 1,000 metres to go, Cherono tried to make a break, but Nageeye held onto his back. Cherono tried to break again, this time Lamdassem was dropped. Approaching the finish line Nageeye, sensing Cherono was spent, accelerated and waved to Abdi to follow him. Abdi responded, with Nageeye getting silver and Abdi bronze two seconds up on Cherono. Kipchoge won by 1:20, greater than his Rio margin of victory.

Very tough weather conditions forced many runners to retire. These included the 2012 champion Stephen Kiprotich and all three Ethiopian runners, among them the current World champion Lelisa Desisa. Only 76 out of 106 athletes finished. The last one was Iván Zarco from Honduras, who was essentially running alone for the whole race and finished 36 minutes behind the winner. Most of the race participants, including Nageeye and Bashir, finished with the season best results, which mainly reflected the lack of competitions due to the COVID-19 limitations.

Kipchoge became the third man to successfully defend the Olympic Marathon title, after Abebe Bikila and Waldemar Cierpinski.

== Background ==
This was the 29th appearance of the event, which is one of 12 athletics events to have been held at every Summer Olympics. Five of the top 10 runners from Rio 2016 returned: gold medalist Eliud Kipchoge of Kenya, bronze medalist Galen Rupp of the United States, fifth-place finisher Alphonce Simbu of Tanzania, seventh-place finisher Tadesse Abraham of Switzerland, and ninth-place finisher Callum Hawkins of Great Britain.

No nations made their men's marathon debut in Tokyo. The United States made its 28th appearance, most of any nation, having missed only the boycotted 1980 Games.

== Qualification ==
Approximately 80 athletes were initially expected to compete (target number of 80) by entry time or ranking; the final number was 110 runners qualified by time, with NOCs universality places yet to enter athletes in addition to the 110 qualifying through time, much more than the expected due to the postponed Games (4 universality places were used in 2016). The qualification period for the entry standard (2:11:30) was from 1 January 2019 to 31 May 2021, with a maximum quota of 3 athletes per National Olympic Committee. Performances achieved between 6 April 2020 and 30 November 2020 were not considered in the qualification system.

A National Olympic Committee (NOC) could enter up to 3 qualified athletes in the men's marathon if all athletes meet the entry standard or qualify by ranking during the qualifying period. (The limit of 3 has been in place since the 1930 Olympic Congress.) The qualifying standard is 2:11:30. This standard was "set for the sole purpose of qualifying athletes with exceptional performances unable to qualify through the IAAF World Rankings pathway." Runners in the top 10 at the 2019 world championship, the top 5 at any IAAF Gold Label marathon, and the top 10 at the Marathon Major Series were deemed to have met the qualifying standard, regardless of actual time. The world rankings, based on the average of the best five results for the athlete over the qualifying period and weighted by the importance of the meet, will then be used to qualify athletes until the cap of 80 is reached. More than 80 athletes (after application of the 3 per NOC rule) have met the qualifying standard.

To be a qualifying performance, the course had to have been certified in the last five years by a Grade A or Grade B road course measurer. In order to be eligible for the qualifying standard time, the elevation decrease could not be more than 1 metre per kilometre. For world rankings, the elevation decrease could exceed that rate, but a correction would be made to the score.

The qualifying period was originally from 1 January 2019 to 31 May 2020. Due to the COVID-19 pandemic, the period was suspended from 6 April 2020 to 30 November 2020, with the end date extended to 31 May 2021. The world rankings period start date was also changed from 1 January 2019 to 1 December 2018. The qualifying time standards could be obtained in various meets during the given period that have the approval of the IAAF. The most recent Area Championships may be counted in the ranking, even if not during the qualifying period. In July 2020, World Athletics announced that the suspension period would be lifted for the road events (marathons and race walks) on 1 September 2020.

NOCs can also use their universality place—each NOC can enter one male athlete regardless of time if they had no male athletes meeting the entry standard for an athletics event—in the marathon.

Qualification ended on 31 May 2021. Both marathons had a target number of 80 athletes, but a larger number of athletes have fulfilled the qualifying criteria and will compete in Sapporo, the venue of the Olympic road events. In the men's field, 106 athletes have qualified (with a maximum of 3 per nation).

Qualification standard	No. of athletes	NOC	Nominated athletes
Entry standard – 2:11:30	3	Australia	Liam Adams; Jack Rayner; Brett Robinson
Entry standard – 2:11:30	3	Bahrain	Alemu Bekele; Shumi Dechasa; El-Hassan El-Abbassi
Entry standard – 2:11:30	3	Belgium	Bashir Abdi; Dieter Kersten; Koen Naert
Entry standard – 2:11:30	3	Brazil	Daniel Chaves da Silva; Daniel Ferreira do Nascimento; Paulo Roberto Paula
Entry standard – 2:11:30	3	Canada	Trevor Hofbauer; Cameron Levins; Ben Preisner
Entry standard – 2:11:30	3	China	Dong Guojian; Peng Jianhua; Yang Shaohui
Entry standard – 2:11:30	3	Eritrea	Yohanes Ghebregergis; Goitom Kifle; Oqbe Kibrom Ruesom
Entry standard – 2:11:30	3	Ethiopia	Lelisa Desisa; Shura Kitata; Sisay Lemma
Entry standard – 2:11:30	3	France	Morhad Amdouni; Hassan Chahdi; Nicolas Navarro
Entry standard – 2:11:30	3	Germany	Amanal Petros; Hendrik Pfeiffer; Richard Ringer
Entry standard – 2:11:30	3	Great Britain	Ben Connor; Callum Hawkins; Chris Thompson
Entry standard – 2:11:30	3	Ireland	Paul Pollock; Stephen Scullion; Kevin Seaward
Entry standard – 2:11:30	3	Israel	Haimro Alame; Girmaw Amare; Marhu Teferi
Entry standard – 2:11:30	3	Italy	Yassine El Fathaoui; Eyob Faniel; Yassine Rachik
Entry standard – 2:11:30	3	Kenya	Lawrence Cherono; Eliud Kipchoge; Amos Kipruto
Entry standard – 2:11:30	3	Mexico	Jesús Arturo Esparza; Juan Pacheco; José Luis Santana
Entry standard – 2:11:30	3	Morocco	Mohamed Reda El Aaraby; Othmane El Goumri; Hamza Sahli
Entry standard – 2:11:30	3	Netherlands	Khalid Choukoud; Abdi Nageeye; Bart van Nunen
Entry standard – 2:11:30	3	Poland	Marcin Chabowski; Arkadiusz Gardzielewski; Adam Nowicki
Entry standard – 2:11:30	3	South Africa	Elroy Gelant; Desmond Mokgobu; Stephen Mokoka
Entry standard – 2:11:30	3	Spain	Javier Guerra; Ayad Lamdassem; Daniel Mateo
Entry standard – 2:11:30	0	Sweden	~~Ebba Tulu Chala~~; ~~Mustafa Mohamed~~; ~~David Nilsson~~
Entry standard – 2:11:30	2	Turkey	Yavuz Ağralı; Polat Kemboi Arıkan; ~~Kaan Kigen Özbilen~~
Entry standard – 2:11:30	3	Uganda	Felix Chemonges; Stephen Kiprotich; Fred Musobo
Entry standard – 2:11:30	3	Ukraine	Bohdan-Ivan Horodyskyy; Mykola Nyzhnyk; Oleksandr Sitkovskyy
Entry standard – 2:11:30	3	United States	Abdi Abdirahman; Jacob Riley; Galen Rupp
Entry standard – 2:11:30	2	Argentina	Joaquín Arbe; Eulalio Muñoz
Entry standard – 2:11:30	2	Austria	Peter Herzog; Lemawork Ketema
Entry standard – 2:11:30	2	Colombia	Iván Darío González; Jeison Suárez
Entry standard – 2:11:30	2	Denmark	Thijs Nijhuis; Abdi Hakin Ulad
Entry standard – 2:11:30	2	Estonia	Roman Fosti; Tiidrek Nurme
Entry standard – 2:11:30	2	Japan	Shogo Nakamura; Suguru Osako
Entry standard – 2:11:30	2	Mongolia	Tseveenravdangiin Byambajav; Bat-Ochiryn Ser-Od
Entry standard – 2:11:30	2	New Zealand	Malcolm Hicks; Zane Robertson
Entry standard – 2:11:30	2	South Korea	Oh Joo-han; Shim Jung-sub
Entry standard – 2:11:30	2	Rwanda	John Hakizimana; ~~Félicien Muhitira~~
Entry standard – 2:11:30	2	Tanzania	Gabriel Geay; Alphonce Simbu
Entry standard – 2:11:30	1	Burundi	Olivier Irabaruta
Entry standard – 2:11:30	1	Lesotho	Khoarahlane Seutloali
Entry standard – 2:11:30	1	Namibia	Tomas Hilifa Rainhold
Entry standard – 2:11:30	1	~~North Korea~~	~~Ri Kang-bom~~
Entry standard – 2:11:30	1	Norway	Sondre Nordstad Moen
Entry standard – 2:11:30	1	Panama	Jorge Castelblanco
Entry standard – 2:11:30	1	Paraguay	Derlis Ayala
Entry standard – 2:11:30	1	Peru	Cristhian Pacheco
Entry standard – 2:11:30	1	Refugee Olympic Team	Tachlowini Gabriyesos
Entry standard – 2:11:30	1	Switzerland	Tadesse Abraham
Finishing position at designated competitions	1	Japan	Yuma Hattori
World ranking	0		
Universality Places	1	Honduras	Iván Zarco
Total	106		

== Competition format and course ==
As all Olympic marathons, the competition was a single race. The marathon distance of 42.195 km was run over a course that starts with two laps around Odori Park. The route then includes a large loop (about half the marathon's length) through the streets of Sapporo, passing by Nakajima Park, Sapporo TV Tower, and Hokkaido University, and crossing the Toyohira River twice. The course then takes two trips around a smaller (approximately 10 kilometres) section of the large loop. The finish line is back at Odori Park.

== Records ==
Prior to this competition, the existing world, Olympic, and area records were as follows.

World record	Eliud Kipchoge (KEN)	2:01:39	Berlin, Germany	16 September 2018
Olympic record	Samuel Wanjiru (KEN)	2:06:32	Beijing, China	24 August 2008

Area	Time	Athlete	Nation
Africa (records)	2:01:39 WR	Eliud Kipchoge	Kenya
Asia (records)	2:04:43	El-Hassan El-Abbassi	Bahrain
Europe (records)	2:04:16	Kaan Kigen Özbilen	Turkey
North, Central America and Caribbean (records)	2:05:38	Khalid Khannouchi	United States
Oceania (records)	2:07:51*	Robert de Castella	Australia
South America (records)	2:06:05	Ronaldo da Costa	Brazil

* — Boston Marathon, aided road course per IAAF rule 260.28

No new records were established during the competition.

== Schedule ==
All times are Japan Standard Time (UTC+9)

The men's marathon took place on a single day.

Date	Time	Round
Sunday, 8 August 2021	7:00	Final

== Results ==
Rank	Athlete	Nation	Time	Time Behind	Notes
1st place, gold medalist(s)	Eliud Kipchoge	Kenya	2:08:38		
2nd place, silver medalist(s)	Abdi Nageeye	Netherlands	2:09:58	+1:20	SB
3rd place, bronze medalist(s)	Bashir Abdi	Belgium	2:10:00	+1:22	SB
4	Lawrence Cherono	Kenya	2:10:02	+1:24	SB
5	Ayad Lamdassem	Spain	2:10:16	+1:38	SB
6	Suguru Osako	Japan	2:10:41	+2:03	SB
7	Alphonce Simbu	Tanzania	2:11:35	+2:57	SB
8	Galen Rupp	United States	2:11:41	+3:03	SB
9	Othmane El Goumri	Morocco	2:11:58	+3:20	
10	Koen Naert	Belgium	2:12:13	+3:35	SB
11	Mohamed Reda El Aaraby	Morocco	2:12:22	+3:44	
12	Nicolas Navarro	France	2:12:50	+4:12	SB
13	Marhu Teferi	Israel	2:13:02	+4:24	
14	Goitom Kifle	Eritrea	2:13:22	+4:44	
15	Jeison Suárez	Colombia	2:13:29	+4:51	
16	Tachlowini Gabriyesos	Refugee Olympic Team	2:14:02	+5:24	
17	Morhad Amdouni	France	2:14:33	+5:55	SB
18	Hamza Sahli	Morocco	2:14:48	+6:10	SB
19	Yang Shaohui	China	2:14:58	+6:20	
20	Eyob Faniel	Italy	2:15:11	+6:33	SB
21	Daniel Mateo	Spain	2:15:21	+6:43	SB
22	Yohanes Ghebregergis	Eritrea	2:15:34	+6:56	
23	Abdi Hakin Ulad	Denmark	2:15:50	+7:12	SB
24	Liam Adams	Australia	2:15:51	+7:13	SB
25	Richard Ringer	Germany	2:16:08	+7:30	
26	Tiidrek Nurme	Estonia	2:16:16	+7:38	SB
27	Girmaw Amare	Israel	2:16:17	+7:39	
28	Jacob Riley	United States	2:16:26	+7:48	SB
29	Amanal Petros	Germany	2:16:33	+7:55	SB
30	Eulalio Muñoz	Argentina	2:16:35	+7:57	SB
31	Peng Jianhua	China	2:16:39	+8:01	
32	Javier Guerra	Spain	2:16:42	+8:04	SB
33	Elroy Gelant	South Africa	2:16:43	+8:05	
34	Oqbe Kibrom Ruesom	Eritrea	2:16:57	+8:19	SB
35	Zane Robertson	New Zealand	2:17:04	+8:26	SB
36	Haimro Alame	Israel	2:17:17	+8:39	
37	Adam Nowicki	Poland	2:17:19	+8:41	
38	Olivier Irabaruta	Burundi	2:17:44	+9:06	SB
39	Sondre Nordstad Moen	Norway	2:17:59	+9:21	SB
40	Abdihakem Abdirahman	United States	2:18:27	+9:49	SB
41	Tomas Hilifa Rainhold	Namibia	2:18:28	+9:50	
42	Derlis Ayala	Paraguay	2:18:34	+9:56	SB
43	Fred Musobo	Uganda	2:18:39	+10:01	
44	Hassan Chahdi	France	2:18:40	+10:02	SB
45	Ben Preisner	Canada	2:19:27	+10:49	SB
46	Yassine El Fathaoui	Italy	2:19:44	+11:06	SB
47	Trevor Hofbauer	Canada	2:19:57	+11:19	SB
48	Shim Jung-sub	South Korea	2:20:36	+11:58	
49	Hendrik Pfeiffer	Germany	2:20:43	+12:05	SB
50	Felix Chemonges	Uganda	2:20:53	+12:15	
51	Yavuz Ağralı	Turkey	2:21:00	+12:22	
52	Joaquín Arbe	Argentina	2:21:15	+12:37	SB
53	Chris Thompson	Great Britain	2:21:29	+12:51	
54	Tseveenravdangiin Byambajav	Mongolia	2:21:32	+12:54	SB
55	José Luis Santana	Mexico	2:21:32	+12:54	SB
56	Dong Guojian	China	2:21:35	+12:57	
57	Kevin Seaward	Ireland	2:21:45	+13:07	SB
58	Dieter Kersten	Belgium	2:22:06	+13:28	
59	Cristhian Pacheco	Peru	2:22:12	+13:34	SB
60	Peter Herzog	Austria	2:22:15	+13:37	SB
61	Shogo Nakamura	Japan	2:22:23	+13:45	SB
62	Arkadiusz Gardzielewski	Poland	2:22:50	+14:12	
63	Malcolm Hicks	New Zealand	2:23:12	+14:34	SB
64	Juan Pacheco	Mexico	2:23:41	+15:03	SB
65	Brett Robinson	Australia	2:24:04	+15:26	SB
66	Khoarahlane Seutloali	Lesotho	2:25:03	+16:25	SB
67	Roman Fosti	Estonia	2:25:37	+16:59	
68	Paulo Roberto Paula	Brazil	2:26:08	+17:30	SB
69	Thijs Nijhuis	Denmark	2:26:59	+18:21	SB
70	Paul Pollock	Ireland	2:27:48	+19:10	SB
71	Cameron Levins	Canada	2:28:43	+20:05	
72	Yuma Hattori	Japan	2:30:08	+21:30	SB
73	Jesús Arturo Esparza	Mexico	2:31:51	+23:13	SB
74	Jorge Castelblanco	Panama	2:33:22	+24:44	SB
75	Iván Zarco	Honduras	2:44:36	+35:58	SB
—	Amos Kipruto	Kenya	–	35 km	DNF
—	Bart van Nunen	Netherlands	–	35 km	DNF
—	Stephen Mokoka	South Africa	–	30 km	DNF
—	Lelisa Desisa	Ethiopia	–	30 km	DNF
—	John Hakizimana	Rwanda	–	30 km	DNF
—	Khalid Choukoud	Netherlands	–	30 km	DNF
—	Marcin Chabowski	Poland	–	30 km	DNF
—	Ben Connor	Great Britain	–	30 km	DNF
—	Desmond Mokgobu	South Africa	–	30 km	DNF
—	Bat-Ochiryn Ser-Od	Mongolia	–	30 km	DNF
—	Daniel Ferreira do Nascimento	Brazil	–	25 km	DNF
—	Tadesse Abraham	Switzerland	–	25 km	DNF
—	Yassine Rachik	Italy	–	25 km	DNF
—	Callum Hawkins	Great Britain	–	25 km	DNF
—	Bohdan-Ivan Horodyskyy	Ukraine	–	25 km	DNF
—	Polat Kemboi Arıkan	Turkey	–	25 km	DNF
—	Iván Darío González	Colombia	–	25 km	DNF
—	Sisay Lemma	Ethiopia	–	Half	DNF
—	Shumi Dechasa	Bahrain	–	Half	DNF
—	Mykola Nyzhnyk	Ukraine	–	20 km	DNF
—	Lemawork Ketema	Austria	–	15 km	DNF
—	Stephen Scullion	Ireland	–	15 km	DNF
—	Oh Joo-han	South Korea	–	10 km	DNF
—	Alemu Bekele	Bahrain	–	10 km	DNF
—	Stephen Kiprotich	Uganda	–	10 km	DNF
—	Gabriel Geay	Tanzania	–	10 km	DNF
—	Daniel Chaves da Silva	Brazil	–	10 km	DNF
—	Oleksandr Sitkovskyy	Ukraine	–	10 km	DNF
—	Shura Kitata	Ethiopia	–	5 km	DNF
—	Jack Rayner	Australia	–	5 km	DNF
—	El-Hassan El-Abbassi	Bahrain	–	—N/a	DQ
