= Athletics at the 2016 Summer Olympics – Men's marathon =

Men's Marathon at the Games of the XXXI Olympiad
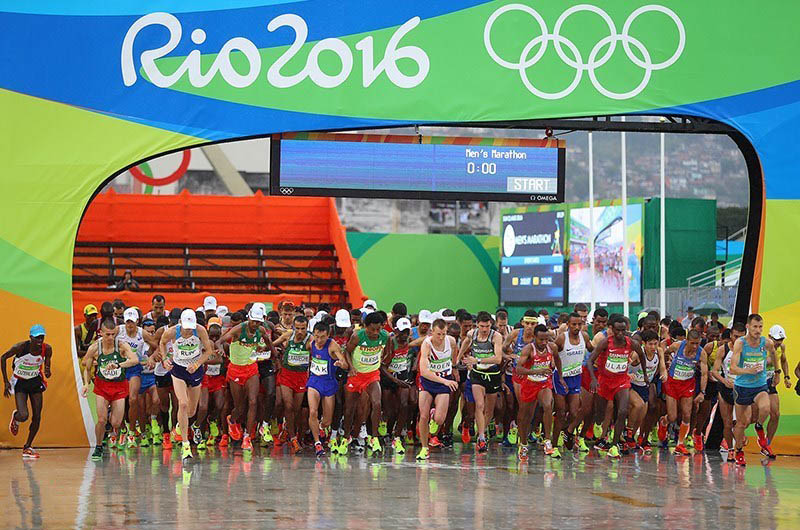
- Beginning of the competition in the rain
- Venue: Sambódromo
- Date: 21 August 2016
- Competitors: 155 from 79 nations
- Winning time: 2:08:44

Medalists
1st place, gold medalist(s)		Eliud Kipchoge; Kenya
2nd place, silver medalist(s)		Feyisa Lilesa; Ethiopia
3rd place, bronze medalist(s)		Galen Rupp; United States

Official Video

The men's marathon at the 2016 Olympic Games in Rio de Janeiro took place on the Sambódromo on 21 August, the final day of the Games. One hundred fifty-five athletes from 79 nations competed. The event was won by Eliud Kipchoge of Kenya, the nation's second victory in the event in three Games. Feyisa Lilesa of Ethiopia took silver, while Galen Rupp of the United States took bronze. The defending champion going into the marathon was Ugandan Stephen Kiprotich.

== Background ==
This was the 28th appearance of the event, which is one of 12 athletics events to have been held at every Summer Olympics. Seven of the top ten runners from the 2012 marathon returned: gold medalist (and 2013 world champion) Stephen Kiprotich of Uganda, fourth-place finisher (and 2004 silver medalist) Meb Keflezighi of the United States, fifth-place finisher Marilson Dos Santos of Brazil, seventh-place finisher Cuthbert Nyasango of Zimbabwe, eighth-place finisher Paulo Roberto Paula of Brazil, ninth-place finisher Henryk Szost of Poland, and tenth-place finisher Ruggero Pertile of Italy. Ghirmay Ghebreslassie of Eritrea was the reigning world champion. Eliud Kipchoge of Kenya was the favorite, with six major wins in the past four years after moving to the road from the track.

Azerbaijan, Georgia, Panama, the Refugee Olympic Team, and Uzbekistan each made their first appearance in Olympic men's marathons. South Sudan made its first formal appearance, though it had had one runner appear as an Independent Olympic Athlete in 2012. The United States made its 27th appearance, most of any nation, having missed only the boycotted 1980 Games.

== Summary ==
The race began at the Sambódromo in a light rain, with temperatures about 24 °C (75 °F). The field size of 155 starters was an Olympic Games record as well as the 140 finishers. The previous record was 124 starters and 111 finishers at the 1996 Olympic marathon in Atlanta. The 2016 race also had the most countries represented of any Olympic marathon and despite the weather conditions a record 62 men finished under 2:20:00 to show the quality and depth of the field.

The lead pack jogged comfortably through almost the first 15 kilometers, when Eliud Kipchoge injected a little speed into the race. By that point the pack was 62 men, that went from a line across the street shoulder to shoulder to a string chasing the leader. 46 still were hanging onto the lead group at the halfway point. Nine more dropped off by 25K. Over the next 5K, the pace gradually increased, losing the defending champion Stephen Kiprotich and reigning world champion Ghirmay Ghebreslassie, though Ghebreslassie was hanging on off the back. At 30K there were only 8 still running together at the front. Lemi Berhanu seemed to be leading the increase of speed, calling back for his teammate Feyisa Lilesa to keep up. Within 2 km, the lead pack was down to four, the two Ethiopians, Kipchoge and Galen Rupp. In the next kilometer, Berhanu fell off the back. By 33K, the medalists were decided. At 35K, Rupp was just behind Lilesa and Kipchoge. Rupp lost contact at the following water station. Shortly after losing Rupp, Lilesa was immediately behind Kipchoge and apparently clipped his heels. Kipchoge was angry, motioning to Lilesa to run next to him, to use the rest of the street. Lilesa didn't respond, Kipchoge accelerated away. From that point, as the course snaked around buildings, the three leaders lost sight of each other as the gaps between them increased. Slightly less than a minute behind the leaders, Ghebreslassie was speeding past the other stragglers. At 40K, Kipchoge had 36 seconds over Lilesa, Rupp another 12 seconds back and Ghebreslassie 59 seconds behind Rupp. Over the lengthy straight finish, Kipchoge expanded his lead to 1:10, giving the thumbs up to the crowd as he finished at 2:08:44. Lilesa struggled but still held 11 seconds ahead of Rupp. Lilesa crossed his arms several times before crossing the finish line at 2:09:54 in solidarity of the protests of his ethnic Oromo people. Rupp finished at 2:10:05 still 59 seconds up on Ghebreslassie.

Eliud Kipchoge had previously won medals on the track in 2004 and 2008; this race marked the continuation of his successful transition to the marathon distance. The difference between this and his last half marathon was 1:02:49. Kipchoge was the only Kenyan finisher in the marathon.

The sky remained overcast throughout the race. The streets remained wet. As Athens 2004 silver medalist Meb Keflezighi, aged 41, was about to cross the finish line in thirty-third place, he slipped. Head and shoulders crossing the finish line, he did a couple of push ups on the ground before righting himself and walking over the line. Later Mohammad Jafar Moradi's hamstring seized up before he reached the finish line. He ended up crawling across the line unassisted. Federico Bruno also cramped up before the entrance of the Sambadrome. He had to finish the entire distance hopping sideways. Derlis Ayala stopped several times to assist Bruno.

The gifts were presented by Abby Hoffman, Council Member of the IAAF immediately after the race. At the closing ceremony, the athletes were presented with the medals by Thomas Bach, IOC President and Sebastian Coe, President of the IAAF.

Abdelmajid El Hissouf (originally 68th) was found guilty of a doping offence by the IAAF in 2017, and his sanction resulted in the annulment of this result; all those finishing behind him were moved up one place.

== Demonstration ==
Feyisa Lilesa of Ethiopia was the silver medalist and as he neared the line he crossed his arms above his head – a political gesture in solidarity with Oromo protests in Ethiopia. After the race he stated: "the Ethiopian government is killing my people so I stand with all protests anywhere as Oromo is my tribe. My relatives are in prison and if they talk about democratic rights they are killed."

== Competition format and course ==
As all Olympic marathons, the competition was a single race. The marathon distance of 26 miles, 385 yards was run over a course that started and finished at the Sambódromo.

== Records ==
Prior to this event, the existing world and Olympic records stood as follows.

World record	Dennis Kimetto (KEN)	2:02:57	Berlin, Germany	28 September 2014
Olympic record	Samuel Wanjiru (KEN)	2:06:32	Beijing, China	24 August 2008

No new world or Olympic records were set during the competition.

== Schedule ==
Time is in accordance with Brasília Time UTC−03:00

Date	Time	Round
21 August 2016	09:30	Final

== Results ==
Rank	Athlete	Nation	Time	Notes
1st place, gold medalist(s)	Eliud Kipchoge	Kenya	2:08:44	
2nd place, silver medalist(s)	Feyisa Lilesa	Ethiopia	2:09:54	
3rd place, bronze medalist(s)	Galen Rupp	United States	2:10:05	PB
4	Ghirmay Ghebreslassie	Eritrea	2:11:04	
5	Alphonce Simbu	Tanzania	2:11:15	
6	Jared Ward	United States	2:11:30	PB
7	Tadesse Abraham	Switzerland	2:11:42	
8	Munyo Mutai	Uganda	2:11:49	SB
9	Callum Hawkins	Great Britain	2:11:52	
10	Eric Gillis	Canada	2:12:29	
11	Abdi Nageeye	Netherlands	2:13:01	
12	Mumin Gala	Djibouti	2:13:04	PB
13	Lemi Berhanu	Ethiopia	2:13:29	
14	Stephen Kiprotich	Uganda	2:13:32	
15	Paulo Roberto Paula	Brazil	2:13:56	SB
16	Satoru Sasaki	Japan	2:13:57	
17	Kaan Kigen Özbilen	Turkey	2:14:11	
18	Bayron Piedra	Ecuador	2:14:12	PB
19	Sondre Nordstad Moen	Norway	2:14:17	
20	Oleksandr Sitkovskyy	Ukraine	2:14:24	
21	Amanuel Mesel	Eritrea	2:14:37	
22	Koen Naert	Belgium	2:14:53	
23	Reid Coolsaet	Canada	2:14:58	
24	Lusapho April	South Africa	2:15:24	
25	Thanackal Gopi	India	2:15:25	PB
26	Kheta Ram	India	2:15:26	PB
27	Pak Chol	North Korea	2:15:27	
28	Evans Kiplagat Barkowet	Azerbaijan	2:15:31	
29	Dong Guojian	China	2:15:32	
30	Ihor Olefirenko	Ukraine	2:15:36	
31	Liam Adams	Australia	2:16:12	
32	Paul Pollock	Ireland	2:16:24	
33	Meb Keflezighi	United States	2:16:46	
34	Anuradha Indrajith Cooray	Sri Lanka	2:17:06	
35	Abdi Hakin Ulad	Denmark	2:17:06	
36	Suehiro Ishikawa	Japan	2:17:08	
37	Marius Ionescu	Romania	2:17:27	
38	Ruggero Pertile	Italy	2:17:30	
39	Artur Kozłowski	Poland	2:17:34	
40	Nicolas Cuestas	Uruguay	2:17:44	
41	Pardon Ndhlovu	Zimbabwe	2:17:48	
42	Víctor Aravena	Chile	2:17:49	
43	Saidi Juma Makula	Tanzania	2:17:49	
44	Florent Caelen	Belgium	2:17:59	
45	Raul Machacuay	Peru	2:18:00	
46	Richer Pérez	Cuba	2:18:05	
47	Michael Shelley	Australia	2:18:06	
48	Ihor Russ	Ukraine	2:18:19	
49	Carles Castillejo	Spain	2:18:34	
50	Ernesto Andres Zamora	Uruguay	2:18:36	PB
51	Ercan Muslu	Turkey	2:18:40	
52	Cristhian Pacheco	Peru	2:18:41	
53	Mariano Mastromarino	Argentina	2:18:44	
54	Daniel Vargas	Mexico	2:18:51	
55	Philipp Pflieger	Germany	2:18:56	
56	Willem Van Schuerbeeck	Belgium	2:18:56	SB
57	Stefano La Rosa	Italy	2:18:57	
58	Cuthbert Nyasango	Zimbabwe	2:18:58	
59	Marilson Dos Santos	Brazil	2:19:09	
60	Tewelde Estifanos	Eritrea	2:19:12	
61	Roman Fosti	Estonia	2:19:26	
62	Atef Saad	Tunisia	2:19:50	
63	Tiidrek Nurme	Estonia	2:20:01	
64	Kevin Seaward	Ireland	2:20:06	
65	Jesús España	Spain	2:20:08	
66	Raúl Pacheco	Peru	2:20:13	
67	Juan Carlos Trujillo	Guatemala	2:20:24	
68	Stsiapan Rahautsou	Belarus	2:20:34	
69	Mynhardt Mbeumuna Kawanivi	Namibia	2:20:45	SB
70	Julian Flügel	Germany	2:20:47	
71	Daviti Kharazishvili	Georgia	2:20:47	
72	Rachid Kisri	Morocco	2:21:00	
73	Marhu Teferi	Israel	2:21:06	
74	Remigijus Kančys	Lithuania	2:21:10	
75	Christian Kreienbuhl	Switzerland	2:21:13	
76	Mohamed Hrezi	Libya	2:21:17	
77	Solonei da Silva	Brazil	2:22:05	
78	Andrés Ruiz	Colombia	2:22:09	
79	Jackson Kiprop	Uganda	2:22:09	
80	Scott Westcott	Australia	2:22:19	
81	Guor Marial	South Sudan	2:22:45	SB
82	Uladzislau Pramau	Belarus	2:22:48	
83	Nitendra Singh Rawat	India	2:22:52	
84	Miguel Ángel Almachi	Ecuador	2:23:00	
85	Ilya Tyapkin	Kyrgyzstan	2:23:19	
86	Gabor Jozsa	Hungary	2:23:22	
87	Gerard Giraldo	Colombia	2:23:48	
88	Luis Ariel Molina	Argentina	2:23:55	
89	Yonas Kinde	Refugee Olympic Team	2:24:08	
90	Duo Bujie	China	2:24:22	
91	Bat-Ochiryn Ser-Od	Mongolia	2:24:26	
92	Jordan Chipangama	Zambia	2:24:58	
93	Hisanori Kitajima	Japan	2:25:11	
94	Lebenya Nkoka	Lesotho	2:25:13	
95	Zhu Renxue	China	2:25:31	
96	Sibusiso Nzima	South Africa	2:25:33	
97	Daniel Estrada	Chile	2:25:33	
98	Ambroise Uwiragiye	Rwanda	2:25:57	
99	Ho Chin-ping	Chinese Taipei	2:26:00	
100	Mihail Krassilov	Kazakhstan	2:26:11	
101	David Carver	Mauritius	2:26:16	
102	Mick Clohisey	Ireland	2:26:34	
103	Hakim Sadi	Algeria	2:26:47	
104	Roman Prodius	Moldova	2:27:01	
105	Luis Alberto Orta	Venezuela	2:27:05	
106	Gantulga Dambadarjaa	Mongolia	2:27:42	
107	Enzo Yanez	Chile	2:27:47	
108	Gáspár Csere	Hungary	2:28:03	
109	Martin Esteban Cuestas	Uruguay	2:28:10	
110	Valdas Dopolskas	Lithuania	2:28:21	
111	Fabiano Joseph Naasi	Tanzania	2:28:31	
112	Makorobondo Salukombo	Democratic Republic of the Congo	2:28:54	
113	Derek Hawkins	Great Britain	2:29:24	
114	Pierre-Célestin Nihorimbere	Burundi	2:29:38	
115	Hristoforos Merousis	Greece	2:29:39	
116	Anton Kosmac	Slovenia	2:29:48	
117	José Amado García	Guatemala	2:30:11	
118	Andjelko Risticevic	Serbia	2:30:17	
119	Ricardo Ramos	Mexico	2:30:20	
120	Tesama Moogas	Israel	2:30:30	
121	Ageze Guadie	Israel	2:30:45	
122	Rui Pedro Silva	Portugal	2:30:52	
123	Segundo Jami	Ecuador	2:31:07	
124	Diego Colorado	Colombia	2:31:20	
125	Bekir Karayel	Turkey	2:31:27	
126	Nicolae-Alexandru Soare	Romania	2:31:53	
127	Yared Shegumo	Poland	2:31:54	
128	Mohammad Jafar Moradi	Iran	2:31:58	
129	Byambajav Tseveenravdan	Mongolia	2:36:14	
130	Son Myeong-jun	South Korea	2:36:21	
131	Michael Kalomiris	Greece	2:37:03	
132	Boonthung Srisung	Thailand	2:37:46	
133	Ricardo Ribas	Portugal	2:38:29	
134	Jorge Castelblanco	Panama	2:39:25	
135	Derlis Ayala	Paraguay	2:39:40	
136	Federico Bruno	Argentina	2:40:05	
137	Shim Jung-sub	South Korea	2:42:42	
138	Neko Hiroshi	Cambodia	2:45:55	
139	Methkal Abu Drais	Jordan	2:46:18	
—	Wesley Korir	Kenya	DNF	
—	Stanley Kipleting Biwott	Kenya	DNF	
—	Isaac Korir	Bahrain	DNF	
—	Tsepo Mathibelle	Lesotho	DNF	
—	Wissem Hosni	Tunisia	DNF	
—	Henryk Szost	Poland	DNF	
—	Lungile Gongqa	South Africa	DNF	
—	El Hadi Laameche	Algeria	DNF	
—	Alemu Bekele	Bahrain	DNF	
—	Abraham Niyonkuru	Burundi	DNF	
—	Wirimai Juwawo	Zimbabwe	DNF	
—	Tesfaye Abera	Ethiopia	DNF	
—	Tsegai Tewelde	Great Britain	DNF	
—	Daniele Meucci	Italy	DNF	
—	Andrey Petrov	Uzbekistan	DNF	
—	Abdelmajid El Hissouf	Morocco	~~2:20:29~~	DSQ
