= Track and field at the 2015 Military World Games – Men's marathon =

The men's marathon event at the 2015 Military World Games was held on 11 October at the KAFAC Sports Complex.

== Records ==
Prior to this competition, the existing world and CISM record were as follows:

World Record	Dennis Kipruto Kimetto (KEN)	2:02:57	Berlin, Germany	28 September 2014
CISM World Record	Mubarak Hassan Shami (QAT)	2:09:22	Venezia, Italy	23 October 2005

== Schedule ==
Date	Time	Round
11 October 2015	9:00	Final

== Medalists ==
=== Individual ===
Gold	Silver	Bronze
Alemu Bekele; Bahrain	Marcin Chabowski; Poland	Linus Chumba; Kenya

=== Team ===
Gold	Silver	Bronze
Poland; Marcin Chabowski; Henryk Szost; Blazej Brzezinski	Ecuador; Manuel Canar Sandoval; Angel Chasi Toalombo; Marco Erazo Montero	Kenya; Linus Chumba; William Chebon Chebor; Paul Malakwen Kosgei

== Results ==
=== Individual ===
Rank	Name	Nationality	Time	Notes
1st place, gold medalist(s)	Alemu Bekele	Bahrain	2:15:07	
2nd place, silver medalist(s)	Marcin Chabowski	Poland	2:15:37	
3rd place, bronze medalist(s)	Linus Chumba	Kenya	2:16:51	
4	William Chebon Chebor	Kenya	2:17:00	
5	Henryk Szost	Poland	2:17:43	
6	Fedor Shutov	Russia	2:18:02	
7	Błażej Brzeziński	Poland	2:18:03	
8	Nitendra Singh	India	2:18:06	
9	Guoxiong Su	China	2:19:41	
10	Dinghong Yang	China	2:21:03	
11	Dorjpalam Batbayar	Mongolia	2:21:16	
12	Bahadur Singh	India	2:21:27	
13	Manuel Canar Sandoval	Ecuador	2:21:41	
14	Mathews Mutanya	Zambia	2:21:53	
15	Angel Chasi Toalombo	Ecuador	2:22:03	
16	Guylain Schmied	France	2:22:06	
17	Patrick Joseph Fernandez	United States	2:23:35	
18	Marco Erazo Montero	Ecuador	2:23:39	
19	Miguel Angel Vaquero Agama	Spain	2:24:54	
20	Dae-Young Yu	South Korea	2:25:06	
21	Frans Chefeni Hosea	Namibia	2:25:13	
22	Said El Medouly	France	2:26:45	
23	Byambajav Tseveenravdan	Mongolia	2:28:01	
24	Kim Young-ho	South Korea	2:28:57	
25	Ivan Docampo Gonzalez	Spain	2:29:15	
26	Heun Gang Lee	South Korea	2:30:00	
27	Samuel Kosgei	United States	2:31:56	
28	Zhongji Zhang	China	2:31:57	
29	Peete Michael Maphephe	Lesotho	2:32:00	
30	Modesto Ricardo Alvarez Dominguez	Spain	2:32:05	
31	Maxim Fuchs	Germany	2:32:18	
32	Iliya Dimchev Kutsarov	Bulgaria	2:33:06	
33	Methkal Abu Drais	Jordan	2:33:43	
34	Paul Malakwen Kosgei	Kenya	2:34:09	
35	Sven Andreas Magnusson	Sweden	2:34:56	
36	Pierre Ndour	Senegal	2:35:41	
37	Indrajeet Yadav	India	2:35:54	
38	Abdoulkader Rabe Hassaou	Niger	2:37:04	
39	Kaliko Mpande	Zambia	2:37:31	
40	Ales Zontar	Slovenia	2:38:09	
41	Nenad Milosavljevic	Serbia	2:39:54	
42	Geordie-John Klein	Netherlands	2:40:22	
43	Zain All Din Zaher	Lebanon	2:41:24	
44	Holger Wollny	Germany	2:41:29	
45	Henrik Schwalbe	Germany	2:42:21	
46	Mohamed Sambe	Mauritania	2:43:48	
47	Wilmer Contreras	Venezuela	2:46:56	
48	Zhan Tosev	Macedonia	2:51:22	
49	Igor Cvetanovski	Macedonia	2:53:58	
50	Michael J Mueller	Canada	2:57:00	
51	Moqhali Cletus Lerata	Lesotho	2:57:10	
52	Zaim Suman	Bosnia and Herzegovina	3:02:30	
53	Florin-Marcel Laza	Romania	3:04:05	
54	Igor Jakimovski	Macedonia	3:09:49	
55	Kadade Yagi	Niger	3:10:29	
	Ahmed Ezzobayry	France	DNF	
	Isaac Korir	Bahrain	DNF	
	Laban Kibon Sialo	United States	DNF	
	Mukhlid Al-Otaibi	Saudi Arabia	DNF	
	Atef Saad	Tunisia	DNF	
	Hassan Shir Ghavi	Iran	DNF	
	Omar Isse	Lebanon	DNF	
	Richard Bwalya	Zambia	DNF	
	Hasan Mahboob	Bahrain	DNF	
	Khash Erdene Khurelbaatar	Mongolia	DNF	
	Mohamed Lemin Chenan	Mauritania	DNS	
	Iwan Kamminga	Netherlands	DNS	
	Blažo Maksimović	Serbia	DNS	
	Namupala Reonard	Namibia	DNS	
	Batyr Amangeldiyev	Turkmenistan	3:08:32	
	Bayram Tashliyev	Turkmenistan	3:15:53	
	Perhat Annagylyjov	Turkmenistan	DNF	

=== Team ===
Rank	Team	Time	Notes
1st place, gold medalist(s)	Poland	6:51:23	
2nd place, silver medalist(s)	Ecuador	7:07:23	
3rd place, bronze medalist(s)	Kenya	7:08:00	
4	China	7:12:41	
5	India	7:15:27	
6	South Korea	7:24:03	
7	Spain	7:26:14	
8	Germany	7:56:08	
9	Macedonia	8:55:09	
	Bahrain	DQ	
	France	DQ	
	Mongolia	DQ	
	United States	DQ	
	Zambia	DQ	
	Turkmenistan	DQ	
