= List of Toyo University people =

List of Toyo University people is a list article of people related to Toyo University.

== University staff ==
- Masajuro Shiokawa, first President

== Alumni ==
- Chafurin, voice actor
- Kosuke Hagino, swimmer, Olympic gold medalist
- Yasuo Ikenaka, marathon former world record holder
- Suehiro Ishikawa, marathon runner
- Hisanori Kitajima, marathon runner
- Yoshihide Kiryū, sprinter
- Ryōta Murata, boxer, Olympic gold medalist
- Yui Ohashi, swimmer
- Ango Sakaguchi, novelist
- Maaya Sakamoto, actress, voice actress and essayist
- Yuta Shitara, marathon runner
- Hitoshi Ueki, actor, comedian
- Masayasu Wakabayashi, comedian
- Fuwa-chan, comedian
- Mitakeumi Hisashi, Sumo wrestler
- Wakatakakage Atsushi, Sumo wrestler

== Dropped out ==
- Masahiko Nishimura, actor
- Hiromitsu Ochiai, Chunichi Dragons supervisor
- Chishū Ryū, actor
