= 2009 IAAF World Cross Country Championships – Senior men's race =

Senior men's race at the 2009 IAAF World Cross Country Championships
- Organisers: IAAF
- Edition: 37th
- Date: March 28l
- Host city: Amman, Jordan
- Venue: Al Bisharat Golf Course
- Events: 1
- Distances: 12 km – Senior men
- Participation: 145 athletes from 44 nations

The Senior men's race at the 2009 IAAF World Cross Country Championships was held at the Al Bisharat Golf Course in Amman, Jordan, on March 28, 2009. Reports of the event were given in The New York Times and for the IAAF.

Complete results for individuals, and for teams were published.

== Race results ==
=== Senior men's race (12 km) ===
==== Individual ====
Rank	Athlete	Country	Time
1st place, gold medalist(s)	Gebre-egziabher Gebremariam	Ethiopia	35:02
2nd place, silver medalist(s)	Moses Ndiema Kipsiro	Uganda	35:04
3rd place, bronze medalist(s)	Zersenay Tadese	Eritrea	35:04
4	Leonard Patrick Komon	Kenya	35:05
5	Habtamu Fikadu	Ethiopia	35:06
6	Mathew Kipkoech Kisorio	Kenya	35:08
7	Mark Kosgey Kiptoo	Kenya	35:11
8	Chakir Boujattaoui	Morocco	35:12
9	Teklemariam Medhin	Eritrea	35:14
10	Hunegnaw Mesfin	Ethiopia	35:16
11	Moses Cheruiyot Mosop	Kenya	35:17
12	Feyisa Lilesa	Ethiopia	35:22
13	Saif Saaeed Shaheen	Qatar	35:28
14	Mangata Kimai Ndiwa	Kenya	35:32
15	Dino Sefir	Ethiopia	35:49
16	Samuel Tsegay	Eritrea	35:51
17	Tadese Tola	Ethiopia	35:52
18	Ahmad Hassan Abdullah	Qatar	36:04
19	Geofrey Kusuro	Uganda	36:07
20	Felix Kikwai Kibore	Qatar	36:14
21	Nicholas Kiprono	Uganda	36:16
22	Samson Kiflemariam	Eritrea	36:20
23	Stephen Kiprotich	Uganda	36:23
24	Issak Sibhatu	Eritrea	36:25
25	Linus Kipwambok Chumba	Kenya	36:29
26	Carles Castillejo	Spain	36:30
27	Ahmed Baday	Morocco	36:35
28	Gamal Belal Salem	Qatar	36:37
29	Collis Birmingham	Australia	36:38
30	Ayad Lamdassem	Spain	36:39
31	Alemayehu Bezabeh	Spain	36:41
32	Stephen Mokoka	South Africa	36:47
33	Ryan Vail	United States	36:54
34	Brahim Beloua	Morocco	36:55
35	Khoudir Aggoune	Algeria	36:55
36	Michael Shelley	Australia	36:58
37	Robert Curtis	United States	37:00
38	Mouhssin Moubssit	Morocco	37:02
39	Faustin Musa	Tanzania	37:03
40	Max King	United States	37:05
41	Moorosi Soke	South Africa	37:05
42	Gervais Hakizimana	Rwanda	37:07
43	Ben Siwa	Uganda	37:07
44	Felix Ntirenganya	Rwanda	37:07
45	José Rocha	Portugal	37:09
46	Mourad Marofit	Morocco	37:10
47	Suehiro Ishikawa	Japan	37:11
48	Jean Baptiste Simukeka	Rwanda	37:17
49	Javier Carriqueo	Argentina	37:20
50	Jeffrey Gwebu	South Africa	37:21
51	Tshamano Setone	South Africa	37:27
52	Sylvain Rukundo	Rwanda	37:29
53	Francisco Javier López	Spain	37:31
54	Hussain Jamaan Alhamdah	Saudi Arabia	37:32
55	Essa Ismail Rashed	Qatar	37:36
56	Kidane Tadasse	Eritrea	37:37
57	Elisante William	Tanzania	37:38
58	Edwardo Torres	United States	37:38
59	Seigo Ikegami	Japan	37:38
60	Ed Moran	United States	37:42
61	Gabriele De Nard	Italy	37:43
62	José Luis Blanco	Spain	37:44
63	Morhad Amdouni	France	37:45
64	Hiroyoshi Umegae	Japan	37:47
65	Adilson Dolberth	Brazil	37:48
66	Tonny Wamulwa	Zambia	37:49
67	Manuel Ángel Penas	Spain	37:49
68	Mark Kenneally	Ireland	37:50
69	Liam Adams	Australia	37:50
70	Suliman Alghodran	Jordan	37:55
71	Chauncy Master	Malawi	37:57
72	Licinio Pimentel	Portugal	37:57
73	El-Mokhtar Benhari	France	37:57
74	Frank Tickner	United Kingdom	37:58
75	Brett Gotcher	United States	38:01
76	Naoki Okamoto	Japan	38:02
77	Ihar Tsetserukou	Belarus	38:04
78	Andrew Vernon	United Kingdom	38:04
79	Eduardo Mbengani	Portugal	38:05
80	James Kibet	Uganda	38:06
81	Benjamin Malaty	France	38:08
82	Eric Sebahire	Rwanda	38:11
83	Manuel Damião	Portugal	38:11
84	Claudir Rodrigues	Brazil	38:13
85	Peter Sulle	Tanzania	38:13
86	Philip Nicholls	United Kingdom	38:15
87	Michael Skinner	United Kingdom	38:22
88	Cheng Tao	China	38:29
89	Methkal Abu Drais	Jordan	38:30
90	Denis Mayaud	France	38:33
91	Lee Merrien	United Kingdom	38:35
92	Sérgio Da Silva	Brazil	38:40
93	Musa Amer Obaid	Qatar	38:42
94	Makoto Fukui	Japan	38:43
95	Sibusiso Nzima	South Africa	39:03
96	Keith Gerrard	United Kingdom	39:03
97	Miguel Barzola	Argentina	39:09
98	Abdullah Abdulaziz Aljoud	Saudi Arabia	39:11
99	Shepherd Kenatshele	Botswana	39:14
100	Kaelo Mosalagae	Botswana	39:22
101	Richard Kalumba	Zambia	39:23
102	Yohan Durand	France	39:25
103	Linos Chintali	Zambia	39:28
104	Sebastian Hallmann	Germany	39:29
105	Saheed Khan	Canada	39:30
106	Ayman Al Rubaiat	Jordan	39:30
107	Kgosi Tsosane	South Africa	39:31
108	Abdel Fattah Zaki Abdelhalem	Egypt	39:34
109	Alex Genest	Canada	39:34
110	Joël Bourgeois	Canada	39:42
111	Sevak Yeghikyan	Armenia	39:43
112	Ahmed Hassein Hassein	Egypt	39:44
113	Ramoseka Raobine	Botswana	39:54
114	Rached Amor	Tunisia	40:02
115	Unaswi Dambe	Botswana	40:14
116	Lin Xiangqian	China	40:15
117	Hussein Momani	Jordan	40:21
118	Hassan Hirt	France	40:29
119	Sotyvoldy Khaitov	Tajikistan	40:34
120	Yovanny Adames	Dominican Republic	40:53
121	Hamza Al-Madahna	Jordan	40:54
122	Ahmed Bakry	Egypt	41:12
123	Khaled Giaeda	Libya	41:24
124	Hassan Marzouk Eisa	Egypt	41:35
125	Mahmood Alrashedi	Iraq	41:38
126	Derek Nakluski	Canada	41:40
127	Raouf Boubaker	Tunisia	41:55
128	Jeiran Khoperia	Georgia	42:02
129	Ahmad Alibrahim	Syria	42:17
130	Ahmad Aljafal	Syria	42:34
131	Qais Salim Al-Mahroqi	Oman	42:40
132	Mohammad Moharm Hmadallah	Egypt	42:44
133	Antoine Simon Labiche	Seychelles	42:50
134	Noori Al-Darraji	Iraq	43:05
135	Samir Pashayev	Azerbaijan	43:16
136	Ali Salih	Iraq	43:27
137	Abdulzahra Al-Mohammedawi	Iraq	44:29
—	Abdel Naser Mohamed Awajna	Palestine	DNF
—	Marvin Blanco	Venezuela	DNF
—	Bashar Mahmoud Irheil Al-Kufrini	Jordan	DNF
—	Hélder Ornelas	Portugal	DNF
—	Abdelrhani El Aouad	Morocco	DNF
—	Daniel Da Silva	Brazil	DNF
—	Rui Pedro Silva	Portugal	DNF
—	Gladson Barbosa	Brazil	DNF
—	Oliver Kandiero	Zimbabwe	DNS
—	Jonathan Chinyoka	Zimbabwe	DNS
—	Elmore Sibanda	Zimbabwe	DNS
—	Samwel Shauri	Tanzania	DNS
—	Cuthbert Nyasango	Zimbabwe	DNS
—	Ezekiel Jafari Ngimba	Tanzania	DNS
—	Wirimai Juwawo	Zimbabwe	DNS
—	Nkosiyazi Sibanda	Zimbabwe	DNS

==== Teams ====
Rank	Team	Points
1st place, gold medalist(s)	Kenya: Leonard Patrick Komon / 4; Mathew Kipkoech Kisorio / 6; Mark Kosgey Kiptoo / 7; Moses Cheruiyot Mosop / 11; (Mangata Kimai Ndiwa) / (14); (Linus Kipwambok Chumba) / (25)	28
2nd place, silver medalist(s)	Ethiopia: Gebre-egziabher Gebremariam / 1; Habtamu Fikadu / 5; Hunegnaw Mesfin / 10; Feyisa Lilesa / 12; (Dino Sefir) / (15); (Tadese Tola) / (17)	28
3rd place, bronze medalist(s)	Eritrea: Zersenay Tadese / 3; Teklemariam Medhin / 9; Samuel Tsegay / 16; Samson Kiflemariam / 22; (Issak Sibhatu) / (24); (Kidane Tadasse) / (56)	50
4	Uganda: Moses Ndiema Kipsiro / 2; Geofrey Kusuro / 19; Nicholas Kiprono / 21; Stephen Kiprotich / 23; (Ben Siwa) / (43); (James Kibet) / (80)	(65)
5	Qatar: Saif Saaeed Shaheen / 13; Ahmad Hassan Abdullah / 18; Felix Kikwai Kibore / 20; Gamal Belal Salem / 28; (Essa Ismail Rashed) / (55); (Musa Amer Obaid) / (93)	79
6	Morocco: Chakir Boujattaoui / 8; Ahmed Baday / 27; Brahim Beloua / 34; Mouhssin Moubssit / 38; (Mourad Marofit) / (46); (Abdelrhani El Aouad) / (DNF)	107
7	Spain: Carles Castillejo / 26; Ayad Lamdassem / 30; Alemayehu Bezabeh / 31; Francisco Javier López / 53; (José Luis Blanco) / (62); (Manuel Ángel Penas) / (67)	140
8	United States: Ryan Vail / 33; Robert Curtis / 37; Max King / 40; Edwardo Torres / 58; (Ed Moran) / (60); (Brett Gotcher) / (75)	168
9	South Africa: Stephen Mokoka / 32; Moorosi Soke / 41; Jeffrey Gwebu / 50; Tshamano Setone / 51; (Sibusiso Nzima) / (95); (Kgosi Tsosane) / (107)	174
10	Rwanda: Gervais Hakizimana / 42; Felix Ntirenganya / 44; Jean Baptiste Simukeka / 48; Sylvain Rukundo / 52; (Eric Sebahire) / (82)	186
11	Japan: Suehiro Ishikawa / 47; Seigo Ikegami / 59; Hiroyoshi Umegae / 64; Naoki Okamoto / 76; (Makoto Fukui) / (94)	246
12	Portugal: José Rocha / 45; Licinio Pimentel / 72; Eduardo Mbengani / 79; Manuel Damião / 83; (Hélder Ornelas) / (DNF); (Rui Pedro Silva) / (DNF)	279
13	France: Morhad Amdouni / 63; El-Mokhtar Benhari / 73; Benjamin Malaty / 81; Denis Mayaud / 90; (Yohan Durand) / (102); (Hassan Hirt) / (118)	307
14	United Kingdom: Frank Tickner / 74; Andrew Vernon / 78; Philip Nicholls / 86; Michael Skinner / 87; (Lee Merrien) / (91); (Keith Gerrard) / (96)	325
15	Jordan: Suliman Alghodran / 70; Methkal Abu Drais / 89; Ayman Al Rubaiat / 106; Hussein Momani / 117; (Hamza Al-Madahna) / (121); (Bashar Mahmoud Irheil Al-Kufrini) / (DNF)	382
16	Botswana: Shepherd Kenatshele / 99; Kaelo Mosalagae / 100; Ramoseka Raobine / 113; Unaswi Dambe / 115	427
17	Canada: Saheed Khan / 105; Alex Genest / 109; Joël Bourgeois / 110; Derek Nakluski / 126	450
18	Egypt: Abdel Fattah Zaki Abdelhalem / 108; Ahmed Hassein Hassein / 112; Ahmed Bakry / 122; Hassan Marzouk Eisa / 124; (Mohammad Moharm Hmadallah) / (132)	466
19	Iraq: Mahmood Alrashedi / 125; Noori Al-Darraji / 134; Ali Salih / 136; Abdulzahra Al-Mohammedawi / 137	532

- Note: Athletes in parentheses did not score for the team result.

== Participation ==
According to an unofficial count, 145 athletes from 44 countries participated in the Senior men's race. This is in agreement with the official numbers as published. The announced athletes from Zimbabwe did not show.

- Algeria (1)
- Argentina (2)
- Armenia (1)
- Australia (3)
- Azerbaijan (1)
- Belarus (1)
- Botswana (4)
- Brazil (5)
- Canada (4)
- China (2)
- Dominican Republic (1)
- Egypt (5)
- Eritrea (6)
- Ethiopia (6)
- France (6)
- Georgia (1)
- Germany (1)
- Iraq (4)
- Ireland (1)
- Italy (1)
- Japan (5)
- Jordan (6)
- Kenya (6)
- Libya (1)
- Malawi (1)
- Morocco (6)
- Oman (1)
- Palestine (1)
- Portugal (6)
- Qatar (6)
- Rwanda (5)
- Saudi Arabia (2)
- Seychelles (1)
- South Africa (6)
- Spain (6)
- Syria (2)
- Tajikistan (1)
- Tanzania (3)
- Tunisia (2)
- Uganda (6)
- United Kingdom (6)
- United States (6)
- Venezuela (1)
- Zambia (3)

== See also ==
- 2009 IAAF World Cross Country Championships – Junior men's race
- 2009 IAAF World Cross Country Championships – Senior women's race
- 2009 IAAF World Cross Country Championships – Junior women's race
