= Algeria at the 2016 Summer Olympics =

- IOC code: ALG
- NOC: Algerian Olympic Committee
- Website: www.coa.dz

in Rio de Janeiro
- Competitors: 64 in 13 sports
- Flag bearer: Sonia Asselah
- Medals Ranked 62nd: Gold 0 Silver 2 Bronze 0 Total 2

Summer Olympics appearances (overview)
- 1964; 1968; 1972; 1976; 1980; 1984; 1988; 1992; 1996; 2000; 2004; 2008; 2012; 2016; 2020; 2024

Other related appearances
- France (1896–1960)

Algeria competed at the 2016 Summer Olympics in Rio de Janeiro, Brazil, from 5 to 21 August 2016. Since the nation's debut in 1964, Algerian athletes had appeared in every edition of the Summer Olympic Games, but did not attend the 1976 Summer Olympics in Montreal, Quebec, Canada, because of the African boycott.

The Algerian Olympic Committee fielded a team of 64 athletes, 53 men and 11 women, across thirteen sports at the Games. It was the nation's largest ever delegation sent to the Olympics, breaking the record of 62 athletes, who attended the Beijing Games eight years earlier. Men's football was the only team-based sport in which Algeria had representatives at the Games, returning to the Olympic scene for the first time since 1980. Among the individual-based sports represented by the nation's athletes, Algeria marked its Olympic debut in sailing.

The Algerian team featured twelve returning Olympians, with 37-year-old marathon runner Souad Aït Salem having participated in four Olympic Games as the oldest and most experienced member. Foil fencer Anissa Khelfaoui, along with boxers Abdelhafid Benchabla and Abdelkader Chadi, was among the Algerian athletes headed to their third Olympics, while eight others previously competed in London, including defending champion Taoufik Makhloufi in middle-distance running, former French fencer Victor Sintès, and heavyweight judoka Sonia Asselah, who was selected by the committee to carry the Algerian flag at the opening ceremony, the first by a female in Summer Olympic history.

Algeria left Rio de Janeiro with only two silver medals, won by Makhloufi in both the men's 800 and 1500 metres.

== Medalists ==
Medal	Name	Sport	Event	Date
Silver	Taoufik Makhloufi	Athletics	Men's 800 m	15 August
Silver	Taoufik Makhloufi	Athletics	Men's 1500 m	20 August

Medals by sport
Sport	1st place, gold medalist(s)	2nd place, silver medalist(s)	3rd place, bronze medalist(s)	Total
Athletics	0	2	0	2
Total	0	2	0	2

== Athletics (track and field) ==
Algerian athletes have so far achieved qualifying standards in the following athletics events (up to a maximum of 3 athletes in each event):

A total of 15 athletes (12 men and 3 women) were named to the Algerian track and field team for the Games, including reigning Olympic champion Taoufik Makhloufi in the men's 1500 metres.

Key

- Note–Ranks given for track events are within the athlete's heat only
- Q = Qualified for the next round
- q = Qualified for the next round as a fastest loser or, in field events, by position without achieving the qualifying target
- NR = National record
- N/A = Round not applicable for the event
- Bye = Athlete not required to compete in round

Track & road events
Men

Athlete	Event	Heat		Semifinal		Final	
Athlete	Event	Result	Rank	Result	Rank	Result	Rank
Amine Belferar	800 m	1:48.40	3 Q	1:46.55	7	did not advance	
Yassine Hathat	800 m	1:46.81	3 Q	1:44.81	3	did not advance	
Taoufik Makhloufi	800 m	1:49.17	1 Q	1:43.85	1 Q	1:42.61 NR	2nd place, silver medalist(s)
Salim Keddar	1500 m	3:40.63	11	did not advance			
Taoufik Makhloufi	1500 m	3:46.82	1 Q	3:39.88	2 Q	3:50.11	2nd place, silver medalist(s)
Abdelmalik Lahoulou	400 m hurdles	48.62 NR	1 Q	49.08	4	did not advance	
Miloud Rahmani	400 m hurdles	49.73	5	did not advance			
Hicham Bouchicha	3000 m steeplechase	8:33.61	8	—N/a		did not advance	
Ali Messaoudi	3000 m steeplechase	DSQ		—N/a		did not advance	
Bilal Tabti	3000 m steeplechase	8:38.87	11	—N/a		did not advance	
El-Hadi Laameche	Marathon	—N/a				DNF	
Hakim Sadi	Marathon	—N/a				2:26:47	104

Women

Athlete	Event	Heat		Final	
Athlete	Event	Result	Rank	Result	Rank
Amina Bettiche	3000 m steeplechase	10:26.91	18	did not advance	
Kenza Dahmani	Marathon	—N/a		2:38.37	50
Souad Aït Salem	Marathon	—N/a		DNF	

Combined events – Men's decathlon

Athlete	Event	100 m	LJ	SP	HJ	400 m	110H	DT	PV	JT	1500 m	Final	Rank
Larbi Bourrada	Result	10.75 SB	7.52 SB	13.78 SB	2.10 PB	47.98	14.15 PB	42.39 PB	4.60	66.49	4:14.60	8521 AF	5
Larbi Bourrada	Points	917	940	715	896	910	955	713	790	836	849	8521 AF	5

== Boxing ==
Algeria has entered eight boxers to compete in the following weight classes into the Olympic boxing tournament. 2012 Olympians Abdelkader Chadi and Ilyas Abbadi were the only Algerians to be selected to the Olympic team with a top two finish of their respective division in the World Series of Boxing, while five further boxers (Flissi, Benbaziz, Kedache, Benchabla, and Bouloudinat) claimed their Olympic spots at the 2016 African Qualification Tournament in Yaoundé, Cameroon.

Fahem Hammachi secured an additional Olympic place on the Algerian roster as a quarterfinalist losing to the eventual champion Mykola Butsenko of Ukraine at the 2016 AIBA World Qualifying Tournament in Baku, Azerbaijan.

Athlete	Event	Round of 32	Round of 16	Quarterfinals	Semifinals	Final	
Athlete	Event	Opposition Result	Opposition Result	Opposition Result	Opposition Result	Opposition Result	Rank
Mohamed Flissi	Men's flyweight	Bye	Asenov (BUL); W 3–0	Finol (VEN); L 0–3	did not advance		
Fahem Hammachi	Men's bantamweight	de Jesus (BRA); L 1–2	did not advance				
Reda Benbaziz	Men's lightweight	Abdelaal (EGY); W 3–0	Abdurashidov (RUS); W 3–0	Otgondalai (MGL); L 0–3	did not advance		
Abdelkader Chadi	Men's light welterweight	Teixeira (BRA); L 1–2	did not advance				
Zohir Kedache	Men's welterweight	Donnelly (IRL); L 0–3	did not advance				
Ilyas Abbadi	Men's middleweight	Ngamissengue (CGO); W 3–0	Alimkhanuly (KAZ); L 0–3	did not advance			
Abdelhafid Benchabla	Men's light heavyweight	Bye	Ramirez (VEN); W 2–0	Buatsi (GBR); L 0–3	did not advance		
Chouaib Bouloudinat	Men's heavyweight	Bye	St-Pierre (MRI); L 1–2	did not advance			

== Cycling ==
=== Road ===
Algerian riders qualified for a maximum of two quota places in the men's Olympic road race by virtue of their top 4 national ranking in the 2015 UCI Africa Tour.

Athlete	Event	Time	Rank
Youcef Reguigui	Men's road race	did not finish	
Abderrahmane Mansouri	Men's road race	did not finish	

== Fencing ==
Algeria has entered two fencers into the Olympic competition. Two-time Olympian Anissa Khelfaoui claimed an Olympic spot as one of the two highest-ranked fencers from Africa outside the world's top 14 in the FIE Adjusted Official Rankings. Meanwhile, former French foil fencer Victor Sintès rounded out the roster by virtue of a top finish at the African Zonal Qualifier in Algiers.

Athlete	Event	Round of 64	Round of 32	Round of 16	Quarterfinal	Semifinal	Final / BM	
Athlete	Event	Opposition Score	Opposition Score	Opposition Score	Opposition Score	Opposition Score	Opposition Score	Rank
Victor Sintès	Men's foil	Bye	Kruse (GBR); L 4–15	did not advance				
Anissa Khelfaoui	Women's foil	Bye	Harvey (CAN); L 6–15	did not advance				

== Football ==
=== Men's tournament ===
Algeria men's football team qualified for the Olympics by attaining a top two finish at the 2015 U-23 Africa Cup of Nations in Senegal.

Team roster

The following is the Algeria squad in the men's football tournament of the 2016 Summer Olympics. The team of 18 players was officially named on 14 July.

Head coach: (Switzerland) Pierre-André Schürmann

No.	Pos.	Player	Date of birth (age)	Caps	Goals	Club
1	GK	Abdelkader Salhi	19 March 1993 (aged 23)	12	0	(Algerian Football Federation) ASO Chlef
2	DF	Miloud Rebiaï	12 December 1993 (aged 22)	0	0	(Algerian Football Federation) ES Sétif
3	DF	Ayoub Abdellaoui	16 February 1993 (aged 23)	13	0	(Algerian Football Federation) USM Alger
4	DF	Abdelghani Demmou*	29 January 1989 (aged 27)	1	0	(Algerian Football Federation) MC Alger
5	DF	Ryad Kenniche (c)	30 April 1993 (aged 23)	7	1	(Algerian Football Federation) ES Sétif
6	MF	Mohamed Benkhemassa	28 June 1993 (aged 23)	17	2	(Algerian Football Federation) USM Alger
7	FW	Baghdad Bounedjah*	24 November 1991 (aged 24)	6	4	(Qatar Football Association) Al Sadd SC
8	MF	Haris Belkebla	28 January 1994 (aged 22)	0	0	(French Football Federation) Tours
9	FW	Mohamed Benkablia	2 February 1994 (aged 22)	0	0	(Algerian Football Federation) ASM Oran
10	FW	Abderrahmane Meziane	7 March 1994 (aged 22)	13	4	(Algerian Football Federation) USM Alger
11	FW	Zakaria Haddouche	19 August 1994 (aged 21)	9	1	(Algerian Football Federation) ES Sétif
12	MF	Raouf Benguit	5 April 1996 (aged 20)	14	0	(Algerian Football Federation) USM Alger
13	FW	Oussama Darfalou	29 September 1993 (aged 22)	11	4	(Algerian Football Federation) USM Alger
14	MF	Sofiane Bendebka*	9 August 1992 (aged 23)	1	1	(Algerian Football Federation) NA Hussein Dey
15	DF	Houari Ferhani	11 February 1993 (aged 23)	13	0	(Algerian Football Federation) JS Kabylie
16	GK	Farid Chaâl	3 July 1994 (aged 22)	0	0	(Algerian Football Federation) USM El Harrach
17	MF	Zakaria Draoui	20 February 1994 (aged 22)	6	0	(Algerian Football Federation) CR Belouizdad
18	FW	Rachid Aït-Atmane	4 February 1993 (aged 23)	1	0	(Royal Spanish Football Federation) Sporting Gijón
22	GK	Oussama Methazem	16 December 1993 (aged 22)	0	0	(Algerian Football Federation) RC Arbaâ

* Over-aged player.

Group play

Pos	Team	Pld	W	D	L	GF	GA	GD	Pts	Qualification
1	Portugal	3	2	1	0	5	2	+3	7	Quarter-finals
2	Honduras	3	1	1	1	5	5	0	4	Quarter-finals
3	Argentina	3	1	1	1	3	4	−1	4	
4	Algeria	3	0	1	2	4	6	−2	1	

Source: Rio2016 & FIFA
Rules for classification: Tiebreakers
4 August 2016
15:00

Honduras	3–2	Algeria
Quioto 13'; Pereira 33'; Lozano 79'	Report (Rio2016); Report (FIFA)	Bendebka 68'; Bounedjah 85'

Estádio Olímpico João Havelange, Rio de Janeiro
Attendance: 20,000
Referee: Sandro Ricci (Brazil)

7 August 2016
18:00

Argentina	2–1	Algeria
Correa 47'; Calleri 70'	Report (Rio2016); Report (FIFA)	Bendebka 64'

Estádio Olímpico João Havelange, Rio de Janeiro
Attendance: 37,450
Referee: Cüneyt Çakır (Turkey)

10 August 2016
13:00

Algeria	1–1	Portugal
Benkablia 30'	Report (Rio2016); Report (FIFA)	Paciência 25' (pen.)

Mineirão, Belo Horizonte
Attendance: 13,787
Referee: Matthew Conger (New Zealand)

== Gymnastics ==
=== Artistic ===
Algeria has entered two artistic gymnasts into the Olympic competition for the first time since 1968. Mohamed Bourguieg and Farah Boufadene claimed their Olympic spots each as the only ranked male and female gymnast from Africa, respectively, at the Olympic Test Event in Rio de Janeiro.

Men

Athlete	Event	Qualification								Final							
Athlete	Event	Apparatus						Total	Rank	Apparatus						Total	Rank
Athlete	Event	F	PH	R	V	PB	HB	Total	Rank	F	PH	R	V	PB	HB	Total	Rank
Mohamed Bourguieg	Individual	12.533	12.900	13.033	13.700	13.500	12.833	78.499	48	did not advance							

Women

Athlete	Event	Qualification						Final					
Athlete	Event	Apparatus				Total	Rank	Apparatus				Total	Rank
Athlete	Event	V	UB	BB	F	Total	Rank	V	UB	BB	F	Total	Rank
Farah Boufadene	Individual	13.916	12.200	10.600	11.100	46.433	53	did not advance					

== Judo ==
Algeria has qualified five judokas for each of the following weight classes at the Games. Houd Zourdani, Lyès Bouyacoub, Mohamed-Amine Tayeb, and Abderahmane Benamadi were ranked among the top 22 eligible judokas for men in the IJF World Ranking List of 30 May 2016, while London 2012 Olympian Sonia Asselah at women's heavyweight (78 kg) earned a continental quota spot from the African region as the highest-ranked Algerian judoka outside of direct qualifying position.

Athlete	Event	Round of 64	Round of 32	Round of 16	Quarterfinals	Semifinals	Repechage	Final / BM	
Athlete	Event	Opposition Result	Opposition Result	Opposition Result	Opposition Result	Opposition Result	Opposition Result	Opposition Result	Rank
Houd Zourdani	Men's −66 kg	Bye	Kopinsky (SUR); W 100–000	Davaadorj (MGL); L 000–101	did not advance				
Abderahmane Benamadi	Men's −90 kg	Juraev (UZB); L 000–000 S	did not advance						
Lyès Bouyacoub	Men's −100 kg	Bye	Remarenco (UAE); W 010–000	Gasimov (AZE); L 010–010 S	did not advance				
Mohamed-Amine Tayeb	Men's +100 kg	—N/a	Temuulen (MGL); W 010–000	Riner (FRA); L 000–100	did not advance				
Sonia Asselah	Women's +78 kg	—N/a	Bye	Yu S (CHN); L 000–100	did not advance				

== Rowing ==
Algeria has qualified one boat each in both the men's and women's single sculls for the Games at the 2015 African Continental Qualification Regatta in Tunis, Tunisia.

Athlete	Event	Heats		Repechage		Quarterfinals		Semifinals		Final	
Athlete	Event	Time	Rank	Time	Rank	Time	Rank	Time	Rank	Time	Rank
Sid Ali Boudina	Men's single sculls	7:45.90	4 R	7:20.84	1 QF	7:13.59	5 SC/D	7:37.19	5 FD	7:06.64	23
Amina Rouba	Women's single sculls	8:55.09	4 R	8:04.21	1 QF	8:21.00	6 SC/D	8:22.34	5 FD	7:46.55	21

Qualification Legend: FA=Final A (medal); FB=Final B (non-medal); FC=Final C (non-medal); FD=Final D (non-medal); FE=Final E (non-medal); FF=Final F (non-medal); SA/B=Semifinals A/B; SC/D=Semifinals C/D; SE/F=Semifinals E/F; QF=Quarterfinals; R=Repechage

== Sailing ==
Algerian sailors have qualified one boat in each of the following classes through the individual fleet World Championships, and African qualifying regattas.

Athlete	Event	Race													Net points	Final rank
Athlete	Event	1	2	3	4	5	6	7	8	9	10	11	12	M*	Net points	Final rank
Hamza Bouras	Men's RS:X	35	36	34	35	~~DNF~~	26	31	DNF	36	DNF	36	24	EL	367	36
Katia Belabas	Women's RS:X	~~DNF~~	DNF	DNF	DNF	DNF	25	27	27	27	27	27	27	EL	290	26
Imène Cherif-Sahraoui	Women's Laser Radial	33	35	~~36~~	34	~~DNF~~	DNF	35	38	DNS	DNC	—N/a		EL	362	37

M = Medal race; EL = Eliminated – did not advance into the medal race

== Shooting ==
Algeria has qualified one shooter to compete in the men's 10 m air rifle by virtue of his best finish at the African Continental Championships, as long as he obtained a minimum qualifying score (MQS) by 31 March 2016.

Athlete	Event	Qualification		Final	
Athlete	Event	Points	Rank	Points	Rank
Chafik Bouaoud	Men's 10 m air rifle	612.1	47	did not advance	

Qualification Legend: Q = Qualify for the next round; q = Qualify for the bronze medal (shotgun)

== Swimming ==
Algerian swimmers have so far achieved qualifying standards in the following events (up to a maximum of 2 swimmers in each event at the Olympic Qualifying Time (OQT), and potentially 1 at the Olympic Selection Time (OST)):

Athlete	Event	Heat		Semifinal		Final	
Athlete	Event	Time	Rank	Time	Rank	Time	Rank
Oussama Sahnoune	Men's 50 m freestyle	22.27	25	did not advance			
Oussama Sahnoune	Men's 100 m freestyle	49.20	31	did not advance			

== Weightlifting ==
Algeria has qualified one male and one female weightlifter for the Rio Olympics by virtue of a top five national finish (for men) and top four (for women), respectively, at the 2016 African Championships. The team must allocate these places to individual athletes by 20 June 2016. London 2012 Olympian Walid Bidani and rookie Fatima-Zohra Bouchra were named to Algeria's Olympic roster on 8 July 2016.

Athlete	Event	Snatch		Clean & Jerk		Total	Rank
Athlete	Event	Result	Rank	Result	Rank	Total	Rank
Walid Bidani	Men's +105 kg	190 NR	10	220 NR	14	410 NR	13
Fatima-Zohra Bouchra	Women's +75 kg	87	16	105	15	192	15

== Wrestling ==
Algeria has qualified a total of three wrestlers for each the following weight classes into the Olympic wrestling tournament. One of them finished among the top six to book an Olympic spot in the men's Greco-Roman 66 kg at the 2015 UWW World Championships, while two additional licenses were awarded to Algerian wrestlers, who progressed to the top two finals at the 2016 African & Oceania Qualification Tournament.

Key:

- VT – Victory by Fall.
- PP – Decision by Points – the loser with technical points.
- PO – Decision by Points – the loser without technical points.
- ST – Decision by points – the loser without technical points and a margin of victory of at least 8 (Greco-Roman) or 10 (freestyle) points.
- SP – Decision by points – the loser with technical points and a margin of victory of at least 8 (Greco-Roman) or 10 (freestyle) points.

Men's Greco-Roman

Athlete	Event	Qualification	Round of 16	Quarterfinal	Semifinal	Repechage 1	Repechage 2	Final / BM	
Athlete	Event	Opposition Result	Opposition Result	Opposition Result	Opposition Result	Opposition Result	Opposition Result	Opposition Result	Rank
Tarek Benaissa	−66 kg	Bye	Tsarev (KGZ); W 3–0 ^{PO}	Chunayev (AZE); L 1–4 ^{SP}	did not advance				8
Adem Boudjemline	−85 kg	Bye	Bayryakov (BUL); L 0–3 ^{PO}	did not advance					17
Hamza Haloui	−98 kg	Guri (BUL); L 0–4 ^{ST}	did not advance						17

== See also ==
- Algeria at the 2016 Summer Paralympics
