= Drais (surname) =

Drais is a surname. Notable people with the surname include:

- Karl Drais (1785–1851), German inventor
- Methkal Abu Drais (born 1983), Jordanian long-distance runner
