= Marcin Chabowski =

Polish long-distance runner

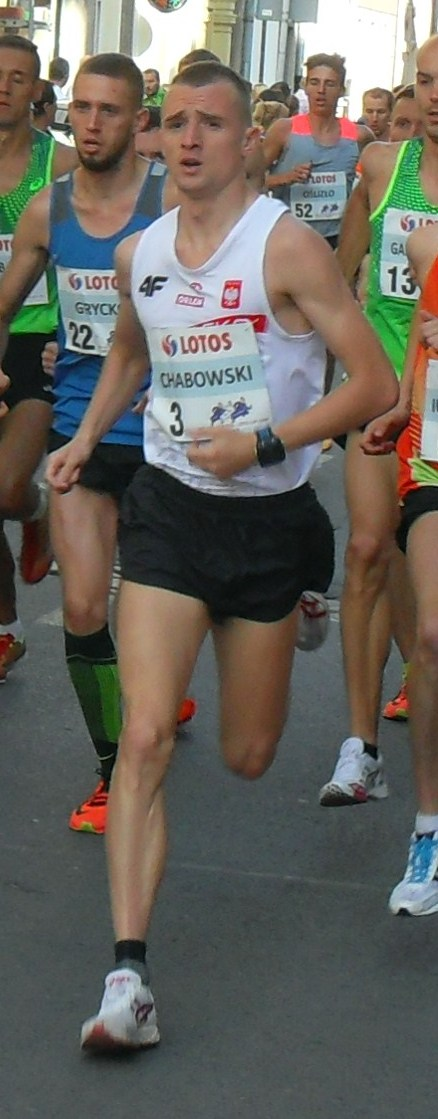
- Marcin Chabowski in 2015

Personal information
- Born: 28 June 1986 (age 40) Wejherowo, Poland
- Height: 1.74 m (5 ft 9 in)
- Weight: 57 kg (126 lb)

Sport
- Sport: Athletics
- Events: Marathon, half marathon
- Club: Wejher Wejherowo (2000–2008); Flota Gdynia (2009–2012); STS Pomerania Szczecinek (2013–)
- Coached by: Andrzej Juniewicz

Marcin Chabowski (born 28 June 1986) is a Polish long-distance runner. He finished fourth in the half marathon at the 2016 European Championships. He led for a large part of the marathon race at the 2014 European Championships but was caught by the chasers and eventually dropped out.

== International competitions ==
Year	Competition	Venue	Position	Event	Notes
Representing Poland
2003	World Youth Championships	Sherbrooke, Canada	5th	2000 m s'chase	5:45.44
2004	World Junior Championships	Grosseto, Italy	9th	3000 m s'chase	8:53.10
2005	European Junior Championships	Kaunas, Lithuania	1st	3000 m s'chase	8:40.88
2007	European U23 Championships	Debrecen, Hungary	5th	3000 m s'chase	8:37.34
2010	European Championships	Barcelona, Spain	11th	10,000 m	29:15.65
2014	European Championships	Zürich, Switzerland	–	Marathon	DNF
2015	Military World Games	Mungyeong, South Korea	2nd	Marathon	2:15:37
2016	European Championships	Amsterdam, Netherlands	4th	Half marathon	1:02:54
2021	Olympic Games	Sapporo, Japan	–	Marathon	DNF

== Personal bests ==
Outdoor

- 1500 metres – 3:44.06 (Warsaw 2009)
- 3000 metres – 8:01.87 (Sopot 2009)
- 5000 metres – 13:52.61 (Bydgoszcz 2009)
- 10,000 metres – 28:27.59 (Kędzierzyn-Koźle 2009)
- Half marathon – 1:02:26 (Piła 2011)
- Marathon – 2:10:07 (Düsseldorf 2012)
- 3000 metres steeplechase – 8:25.90 (Szczecin 2008)

Indoor

- 3000 metres – 8:13.82 (Spała 2004)
