= Ambroise Uwiragiye =

Rwandan long-distance runner

Personal information
- Born: 31 December 1980 (age 45)

Sport
- Sport: Track and field
- Event: Marathon

Ambroise Uwiragiye (born 31 December 1980) is a Rwandan long-distance runner who specialises in the marathon. He competed in the men's marathon event at the 2016 Summer Olympics where he finished in 99th place with a time of 2:25:57.
