= Michael Kalomiris =

Greek long-distance runner

Personal information
- Born: 9 October 1986 (age 39)
- Height: 181 cm (5 ft 11 in)
- Weight: 65 kg (143 lb)

Sport
- Sport: Track and field
- Event: Marathon

Michael Kalomiris (born 9 October 1986) is a Greek long-distance runner and attorney who specializes in the marathon.

Kalomiris qualified for the 2016 Olympics due to his top-ten finish of eighth in the 2015 Rome Marathon, an IAAF Gold Label Road Race. This was despite the fact that his time in that race was 10.5 minutes below the Olympic qualifying standard; not knowing about the Gold Label qualification method, Kalomiris was amazed to see his name on a list of Olympic athletes. He took a three-month leave of absence from his job as a lawyer to train for the Olympic marathon.

In the men's marathon event at the 2016 Summer Olympics he finished in 132nd place with a time of 2:37:03.
