= Mohamed Reda El Aaraby =

Moroccan long-distance runner

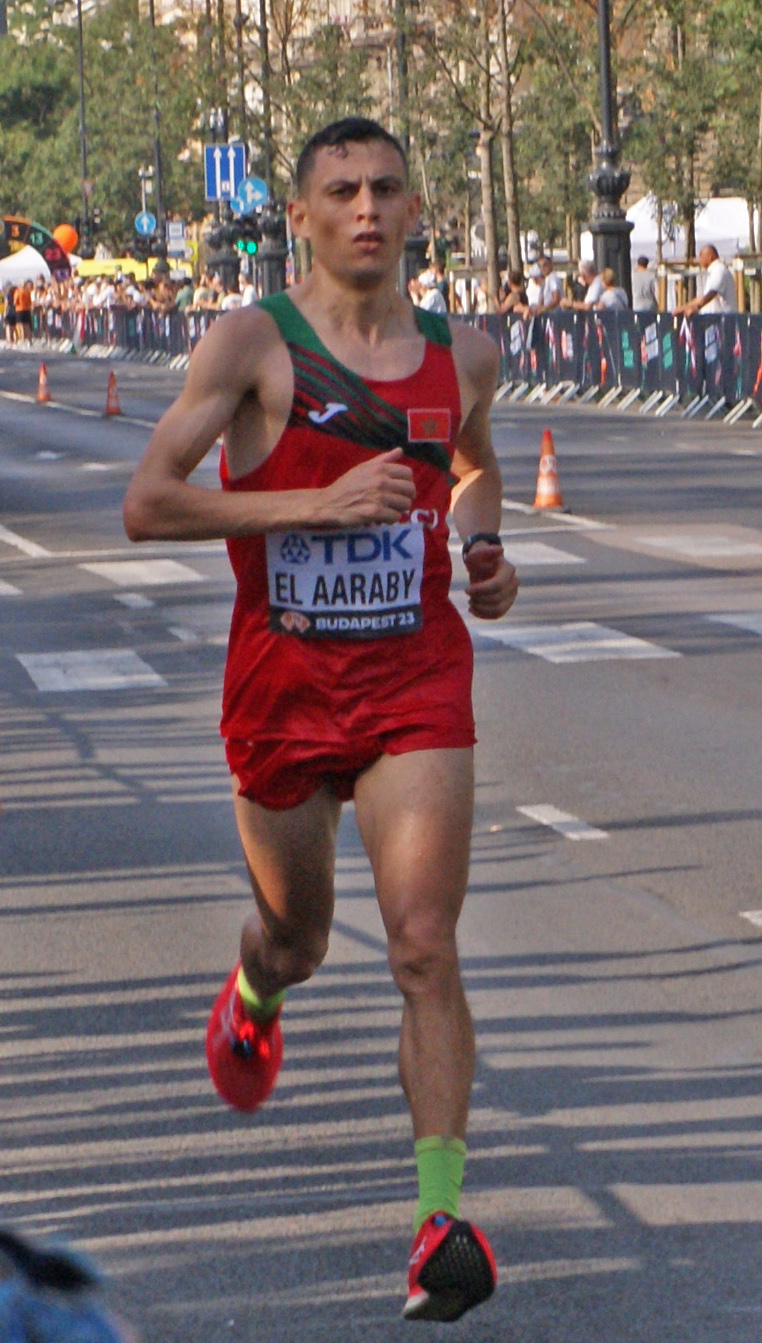
- Mohamed Reda El Aaraby at the 2023 World Athletics Championships

Personal information
- Born: 12 November 1989 (age 36)

Sport
- Country: Morocco
- Sport: Athletics
- Event: Long-distance running

Achievements and titles
- Olympic finals: 2020
Medal record
Representing Morocco
Mediterranean Games
Gold medal – first place	2018 Tarragona	Half marathon

Mohamed Reda El Aaraby (born 12 November 1989) is a Moroccan long-distance runner who specializes in the marathon.

He is an Olympian and competed in the men's marathon at the 2020 Summer Olympics, finishing 11th.

He won the gold medal in the half marathon at the 2018 Mediterranean Games.

El Aaraby has had notable performances in international marathons and road races, including:

- 2nd place at the New York City Marathon (2021)
- 4th place at the New York City Marathon (2022)
- 3rd place at the Seville Marathon (2025) with a time of 2:06:45
- 4th place at the Rabat Marathon with a time of 2:09
- 2nd place at the Bix7 Road Race (USA, 2024)
- 3rd place at the Falmouth 7 Mile Road Race (USA, 2024)

He is a multiple-time World Military Champion and was named Best Military Athlete in the World in 2023. He has also won multiple Moroccan national championships.

== Personal bests ==
Outdoor

- 1500 metres – 3:47.51 (Rabat 2010)
- 3000 metres – 8:06.25 (Montgeron 2015)
- 5000 metres – 13:42.53 (Kortrijk 2016)
- 10,000 metres – 28:44.25 (Wuhan 2019)

Road

- 10 kilometres – 27:58 (Valencia 2019)
- Half marathon – 59:54 (Málaga 2022)
- Marathon – 2:06:45 (Sevilla 2025)
