= Hisanori Kitajima =

Japanese long-distance runner

Hisanori Kitajima (born 16 October 1984) is a Japanese long-distance runner.

== University career ==
Kitajim competed for Toyo University and won a stage of the Hakone Ekiden.

== 2015 season ==
In 2015, Kitajim won the Sydney Marathon with a time of 2:12:44. He also won the Nobeoka West Japan Marathon.

== 2016 season ==
Kitajima finished 2nd at the 2016 Lake Biwa Marathon and was the top finishing runner from Japan. As this was a qualifying race for the Japanese Olympic Team he earned selection for the 2016 Olympics. He earned second place by passing Suehiro Ishikawa with one kilometer to go, where he finished 93rd overall.
