= Brett Gotcher =

American long-distance runner

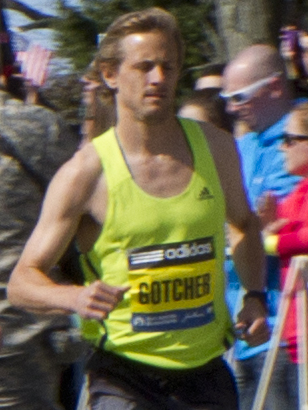

Personal information
- Nationality: American
- Born: September 1, 1984 (age 41)
- Height: 5 ft 11 in (1.80 m)
- Weight: 145 lb (66 kg)

Sport
- Event(s): Mile, 5000 meters, 10,000 meters, marathon
- College team: Western State

Brett Gotcher is an American long distance runner.

Gotcher ran for Aptos High School and Stanford University.

At the 2009 IAAF World Half Marathon Championships Gotcher finished 64th.

At the 2009 IAAF World Cross Country Championships Gotcher finished 75th.

He made his marathon debut in 2010.
