= Mykola Nyzhnyk =

Ukrainian long-distance runner

Personal information
- Nationality: Ukrainian
- Born: 26 July 1995 (age 30)

Sport
- Sport: Athletics
- Event: Long-distance running

Mykola Nyzhnyk (born 26 July 1995) is a Ukrainian long-distance runner.

== Career ==
He qualified to represent Ukraine at the 2020 Summer Olympics in Tokyo 2021, competing in men's marathon.

In early March 2022, Nyzhnyk, who had been training near Iten, Kenya, returned to Ukraine to join its armed forces after the beginning of the Russian invasion of Ukraine.
