= Mynhardt Kawanivi =

Namibian long-distance runner

Personal information
- Born: 3 March 1984 (age 42)

Sport
- Sport: Track and field
- Event: Marathon

Mynhardt Mbeumuna Kawanivi (born 3 March 1984) is a Namibian long-distance runner who specialises in the marathon. He competed in the men's marathon event at the 2016 Summer Olympics where he finished in 70th place with a time of 2:20:45.
