= Anđelko Rističević =

Serbian athlete (born 1985)

Personal information
- Born: 23 December 1985 (age 40) Belgrade, Serbia
- Height: 191 cm (6 ft 3 in)
- Weight: 78 kg (172 lb)

Sport
- Sport: Track and field
- Event: Marathon

Anđelko Rističević (born 23 December 1985) is a Serbian long-distance runner who specialises in the marathon. He competed in the men's marathon event at the 2016 Summer Olympics.
