= Yohanes Ghebregergis =

Eritrean long-distance runner

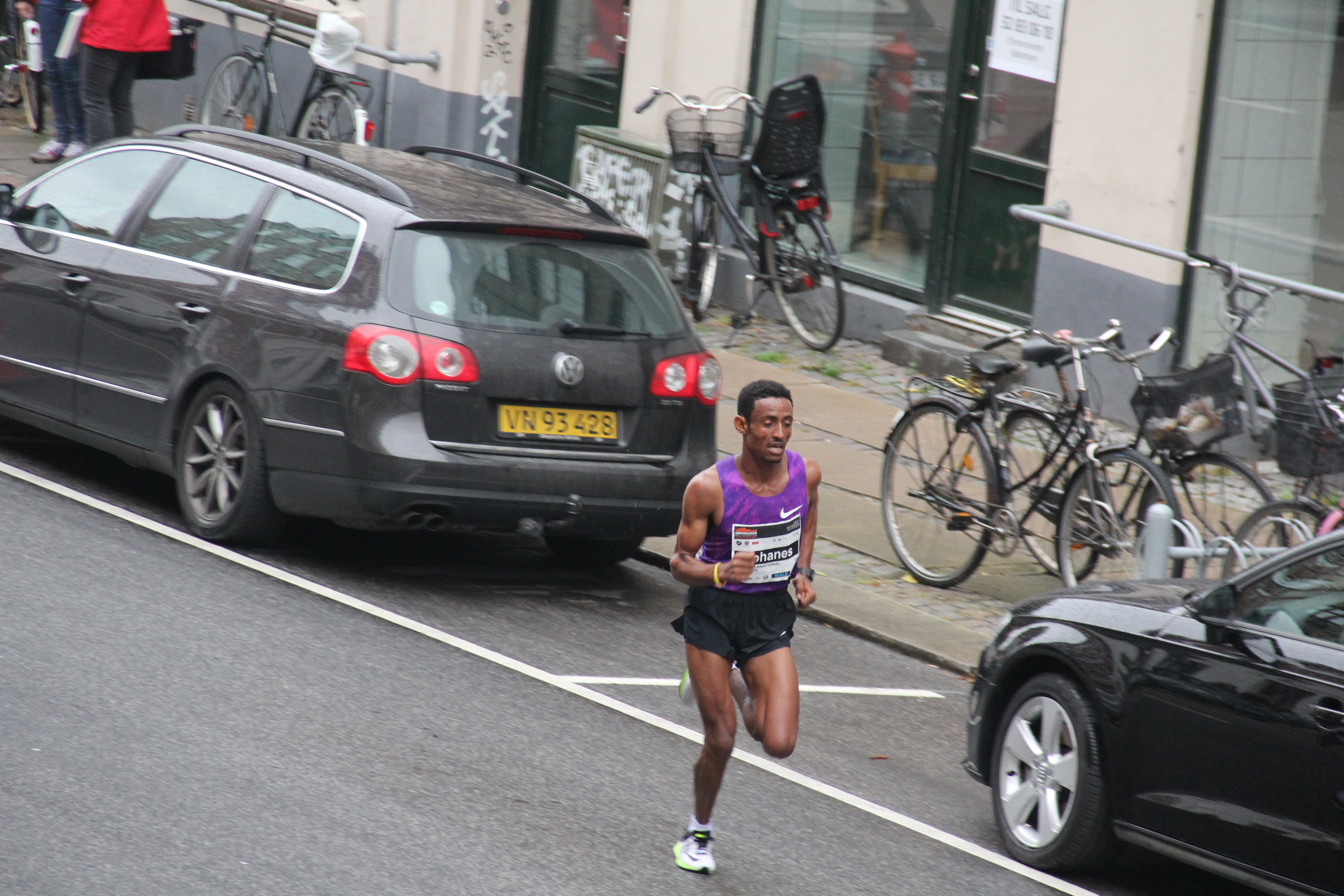
- Ghebregergis at the 2015 Copenhagen Half Marathon

Personal information
- Nationality: Eritrean
- Born: 1 January 1989 (age 36)

Sport
- Sport: Long-distance running
- Event: Marathon

Yohanes Ghebregergis (born 1 January 1989) is an Eritrean long-distance runner. He competed in the men's marathon at the 2017 World Championships in Athletics, placing 7th in 2:12:07. He competed at the 2020 Summer Olympics in the men's marathon.

He finished in 7th place in the men's race of the 2017 Tokyo Marathon.
