= Ricardo Ramos (athlete) =

Mexican long-distance runner

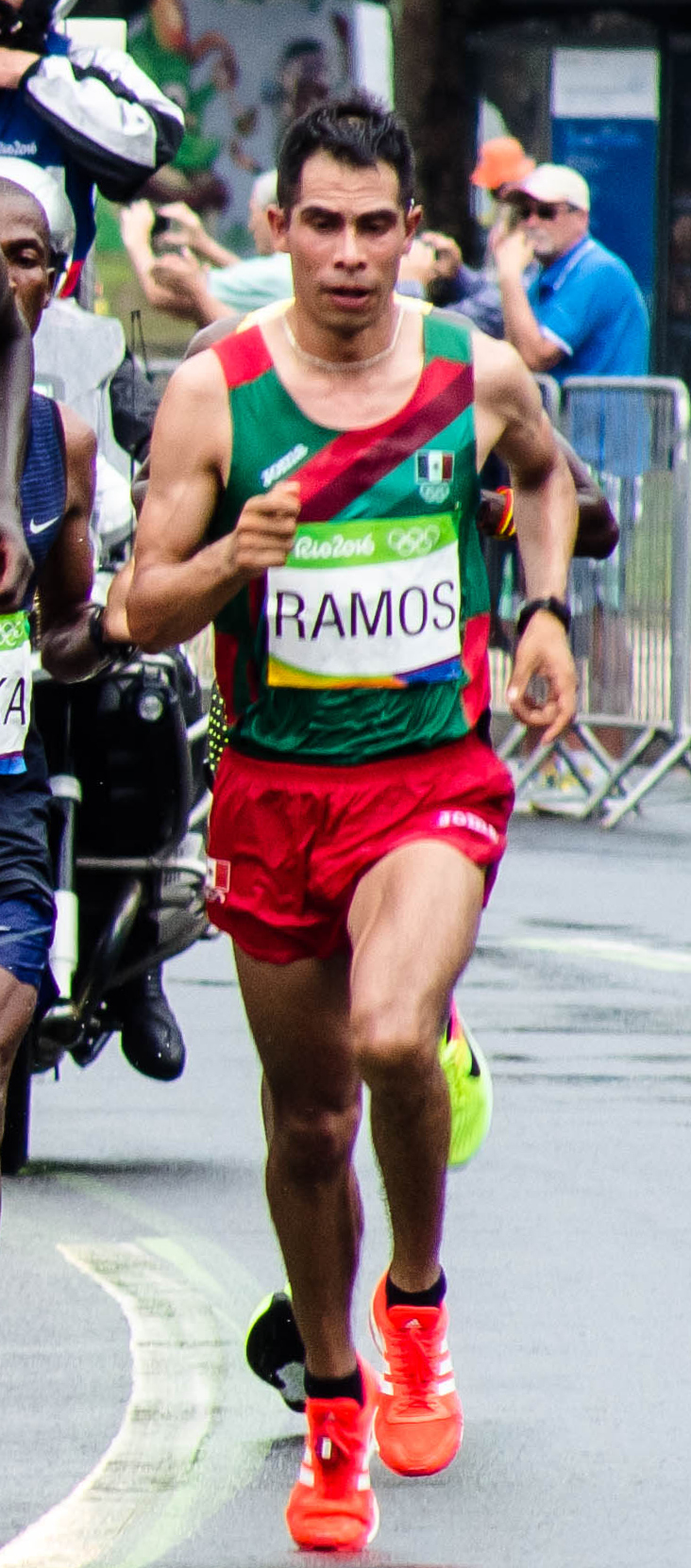
- Ramos at the 2016 Olympics

Personal information
- Born: 5 December 1985 (age 40) Mexico
- Height: 172 cm (5 ft 8 in)
- Weight: 56 kg (123 lb)

Sport
- Sport: Athletics
- Events: Marathon, half marathon
- Club: Hidalgo/SEDENA
- Coached by: Enrique Hernandez

Ricardo Ramos (born 5 December 1985) is a Mexican long-distance runner. At the 2016 Summer Olympics, he competed in the marathon, finishing in 120th place in just his third marathon.

Ramos took up long-distance running aged 19 to improve his health. He is married and has three children. He serves with the Mexican Army.

== Personal Bests ==
- 5000m - 14:27.19 (2016)
- 10000m - 29:35.85 (2016)
- Half Marathon - 1:05.00 (2016)
- Marathon - 2:14.58 (2016)
