= Yassine El Fathaoui =

Italian sprinter

Personal information
- National team: Italy
- Born: 23 March 1982 (age 44) Belfaa, Morocco
- Height: 1.69 m (5 ft 7 in)
- Weight: 53 kg (117 lb)

Sport
- Sport: Athletics
- Event: Long-distance running
- Club: Circolo Minerva Parma
- Coached by: Fabrizio Mattioli

Achievements and titles
- Personal best: Marathon: 2:10:10 (2020)

Yassine El Fathaoui (born 23 March 1982) is a Moroccan-born Italian long-distance runner, and was a part of the Italian athletics team for the Tokyo 2020 Olympics. He competed in the Marathon ending 47th.
