= Son Myeong-jun =

South Korean long-distance runner

Personal information
- Born: 17 January 1994 (age 32)

Sport
- Country: South Korea
- Sport: Athletics

Son Myeong-jun (Korean: 손명준, Korean pronunciation: [son.mjʌŋ.dʑun]; born 17 January 1994) is a South Korean long-distance runner who specialises in the marathon. He competed in the men's marathon at the 2016 Summer Olympics.

== Personal Bests ==
- 1500m - 3:52.57 (2018)
- 5000m - 13:55.03 (2014)
- 10000m - 30:00.00 (2012)
- Half Marathon - 1:04:17 (2012)
- Marathon - 2:12:34 (2016)
