= Peng Jianhua =

Chinese long-distance runner

Personal information
- Nationality: Chinese
- Born: 18 December 1996 (age 29)

Sport
- Sport: Athletics
- Event: Long-distance running

Achievements and titles
- Personal best: Marathon: 2:09:57 (Guangzhou 2019)

Peng Jianhua (Chinese: 彭建华; born 18 December 1996) is a Chinese long-distance runner. He qualified to represent China at the 2020 Summer Olympics in Tokyo 2021, competing in the men's marathon.
