= Felix Chemonges =

Ugandan long-distance runner

Personal information
- Full name: Filex Malewa Chemongesi
- Born: 10 October 1995 (age 30)

Sport
- Country: Uganda
- Sport: Long-distance running

Felix Chemonges (born 10 October 1995) is an Ugandan long-distance runner.

In 2018, he competed in the men's half marathon at the 2018 IAAF World Half Marathon Championships held in Valencia, Spain. He finished in 26th place. In November Felix made his marathon debut placing second in 2:11:57 at the Beirut Marathon.

In 2019, Chemonges was second at the Borealis Linz Donau Marathon in Austria in a time of 2:09:19. In his next marathon at the Toronto Waterfront Marathon Chemonges made a big improvement to his personal best placing 3rd in a Ugandan National Record time of 2:05:12.

In 2020, Chemonges competed in The 76th Lake Biwa Mainichi Marathon where he finished 9th in 2:10:08.

In 2021, Chemonges competed at the NN Mission Marathon in Enschede, Netherlands, where he finished 8th in 2:09:59. The race was won by Kenya's Eliud Kipchoge. Chemonges was selected to join compatriots Stephen Kiprotich and Fred Musobo on Uganda's men's marathon team at the 2020 Tokyo Olympic Games.
