= Linus Chumba =

Kenyan long-distance runner

Medal record

Men's athletics

Representing Kenya

IAAF World Cross Country Championships
Gold medal – first place	2009 Amman	Team

Linus Kipwambok Chumba (born 9 February 1980) is a Kenyan long-distance runner who formerly competing in the 3000 metres steeplechase and currently competes in half marathons and marathons. He has a personal best of 8:11.98 minutes for the steeplechase, set in 2005. He represented Kenya at the 2009 IAAF World Cross Country Championships and shared in the team gold medals.

== Career ==
He made his first impact on the international circuit in 2003, finishing second in the steeplechase at the Hanžeković Memorial with a best of 8:19.26 minutes – enough to rank him in the top thirty for the year. He dropped outside the global top 100 the following year, but rebounded in 2005 with a best of 8:11.98 minutes at the Golden Gala in Rome, which placed him 16th in the world. He did not compete in the 2006 and 2007 seasons, and only ran in Kenya in 2008.

Chumba returned to action and gained his first national call-up after a fourth-place finish at the Kenyan Cross Country Championships. At the 2009 IAAF World Cross Country Championships he came 25th – the lowest of the Kenyan athletes – and shared in the team gold medals. On the track circuit in 2009, he came second in the steeplechase at the Barcelona Meeting and had a season's best of 8:14.51 minutes in Athens, returning to the global top twenty again.

In July 2010 he had his first major win on the 2010 IAAF Diamond League series, setting a meeting record to win at the British Grand Prix in Gateshead. That season he was fifth at both the Colorful Daegu Championships Meeting and the DN Galan – at the latter meeting he ran 8:18.48 minutes to place 22nd on the world lists for the season. His sole significant outing of 2011 was a run of 8:24.10 minutes at the Shanghai Golden Grand Prix, ranking him outside the world top 50. This was his last appearance on the international track and field circuit.

From 2012 onwards he began to focus on road running competition in the United States instead. In 2013 he ran a half marathon best of 62:33 minutes and at the 2014 Macau Marathon he finished in 2:15:20 hours.

== Personal bests ==
- 3000 metres steeplechase – 8:11.98 (2005)
- 3000 metres – 7:53.52 (2009)
- 5000 metres – 13:21.52 (2005)
- 10K run – 28:09 (2013)
- Half marathon – 1:02:33 (2013)
- Marathon – 2:15:20 (2014)

== International competitions ==
Year	Competition	Venue	Position	Event	Notes
2009	World Cross Country Championships	Amman, Jordan	25th	Senior race	36:29
2009	World Cross Country Championships	Amman, Jordan	1st	Team race	
