= Bart van Nunen =

Dutch athlete (born 1995)

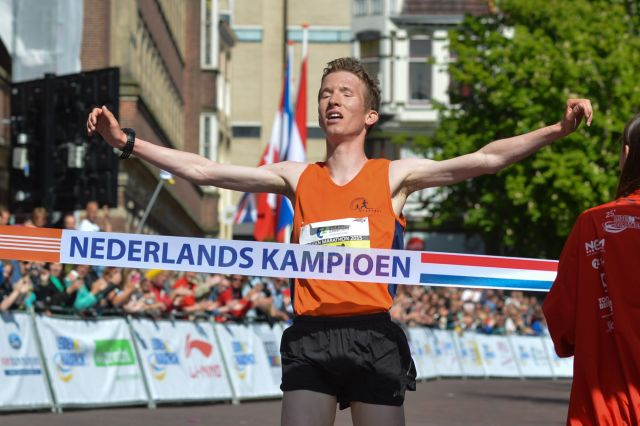

Personal information
- Nationality: Dutch
- Born: 24 September 1995 (age 30) Utrecht, the Netherlands

Sport
- Sport: Athletics
- Event: Marathon

Bart van Nunen (born 24 September 1995 in Utrecht) is a Dutch track and field athlete who specializes in the marathon.

On 6 December 2020 he set his current personal best in the marathon of 2:10:16 during the 2020 Valencia marathon in Valencia, Spain, which qualified him for the 2020 Summer Olympics.

== Personal bests ==
=== Outdoor ===
- Marathon - 2:10:16 (Valencia 6 December 2020)
