= Shim Jung-sub =

South Korean long-distance runner

Personal information
- Born: 21 February 1991 (age 35)
- Height: 168 cm (5 ft 6 in) (2014)
- Weight: 58 kg (128 lb) (2014)

Sport
- Sport: Track and field
- Event: Marathon

Korean name
- Hangul: 심종섭
- RR: Sim Jongseop
- MR: Sim Chongsŏp

Shim Jung-sub (Korean: 심종섭, Korean pronunciation: [ɕim.dʑʌŋ.sʌp̚] or [ɕim] [tɕʌŋ.sʌp̚]; born 21 February 1991) is a South Korean long-distance runner who specialises in the marathon. He competed in the men's marathon event at the 2016 Summer Olympics.
