= El-Hadi Laameche =

Algerian marathon runner

El-Hadi Laameche (born March 5, 1990) is an Algerian marathon runner. He competed at the 2016 Summer Olympics in the men's marathon but did not finish the race.
