= Fred Musobo =

Ugandan mountain runner

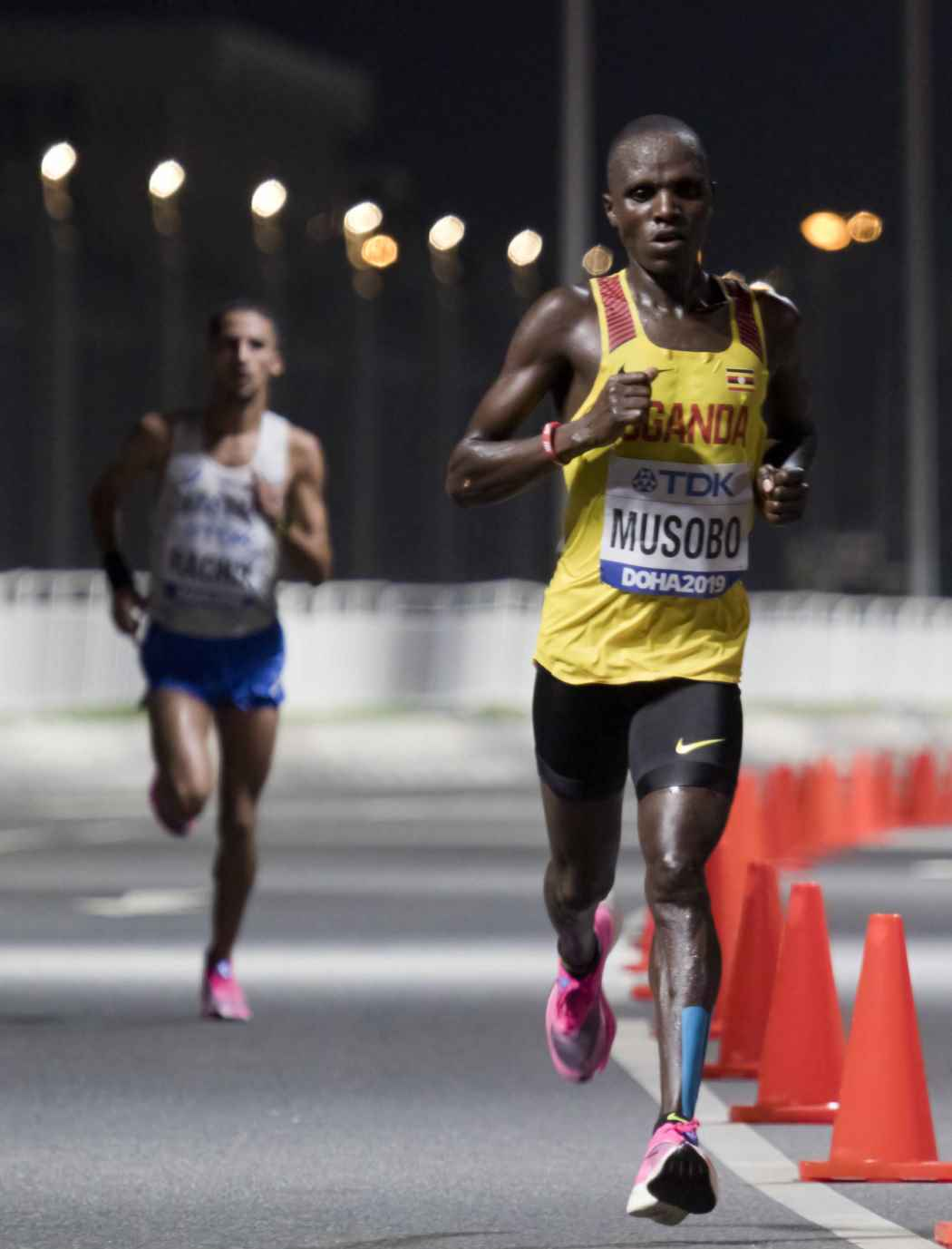
- Musobo in 2019

Personal information
- Nationality: Ugandan
- Born: 12 August 1996 (age 30)

Sport
- Country: Uganda
- Sport: Mountain running
- Club: G.P. Parco Alpi Apuane, Italy

Fred Musobo (born 12 August 1996) is a Ugandan mountain runner.

== Career ==
Musobo placed first in the 2015 World Mountain Running Championships.

In 2018 Musobo represented Uganda at the World Half Marathon Championships in Valencia, Spain. Fred placed 20th in a time of 1:01:38. Kenya's Geoffrey Kamworor won the race. Fred made his marathon debut in April at the Milano Marathon, where he ran a time of 2:13:50, finishing 4th place. Musobo's next marathon was at the Seoul JoongAn Marathon, where he finished 5th in a time of 2:09:04.

In 2019 Musobo ran the International Marathon, Daegu, where he placed 3rd in a new personal best time of 2:06:56. In 2019, he represented Uganda in the men's marathon at the 2019 World Athletics Championships held in Doha, Qatar. He finished in 13th place. The race was won by Ethiopia's Lelisa Desisa. In November, Musobo competed in his third marathon of the year, placing 2nd at the MTN Kampala Marathon in 2:15:23.

On 7 March 2021, Fred Musobo won the Source of the Nile Half Marathon in 1:03:14. On 11 April 2021, Musobo competed in the Xiamen Marathon and Tuscany Camp Global Elite Race in Siena, Italy. He placed 15th in a time of 2:08:24. The race was won by Kenya's Eric Kiptanui. Fred Musobo was selected to compete in the men's marathon at the 2020 Tokyo Olympic Games alongside compatriots Stephen Kiprotich and Felix Chemonges.
