= Suehiro Ishikawa =

Japanese long-distance runner

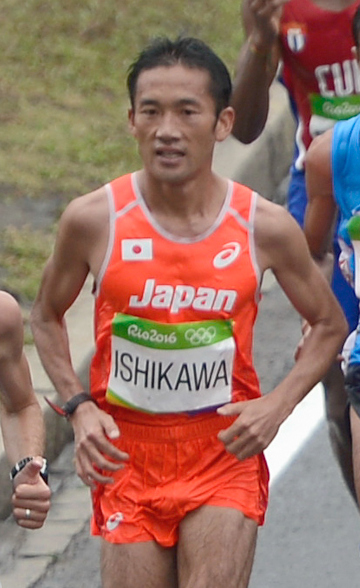
- Ishikawa at the 2016 Olympics

Personal information
- Nationality: Japanese
- Born: 27 September 1979 (age 46) Suzuka, Japan
- Education: Toyo University
- Height: 169 cm (5 ft 7 in)
- Weight: 56 kg (123 lb)

Sport
- Sport: Athletics
- Event: 5000 m – marathon
- Club: Honda
- Coached by: Yosuke Osawa

Achievements and titles
- Personal bests: 5000 m – 13:48.10 (2008); 10,000 m – 28:07.04 (2009); Marathon – 2:09:10 (2013)

Suehiro Ishikawa (Japanese: 石川末廣; born 27 September 1979) is a Japanese long-distance runner. He finished 47th in the senior men's race at the 2009 IAAF World Cross Country Championships. He placed seventh at the 2013 Berlin Marathon and fourth at the 2016 Lake Biwa Marathon, qualifying for the 2016 Olympics.

Ishikawa has a degree in economics from the Toyo University.
