= Atef Saad =

Tunisian long-distance runner

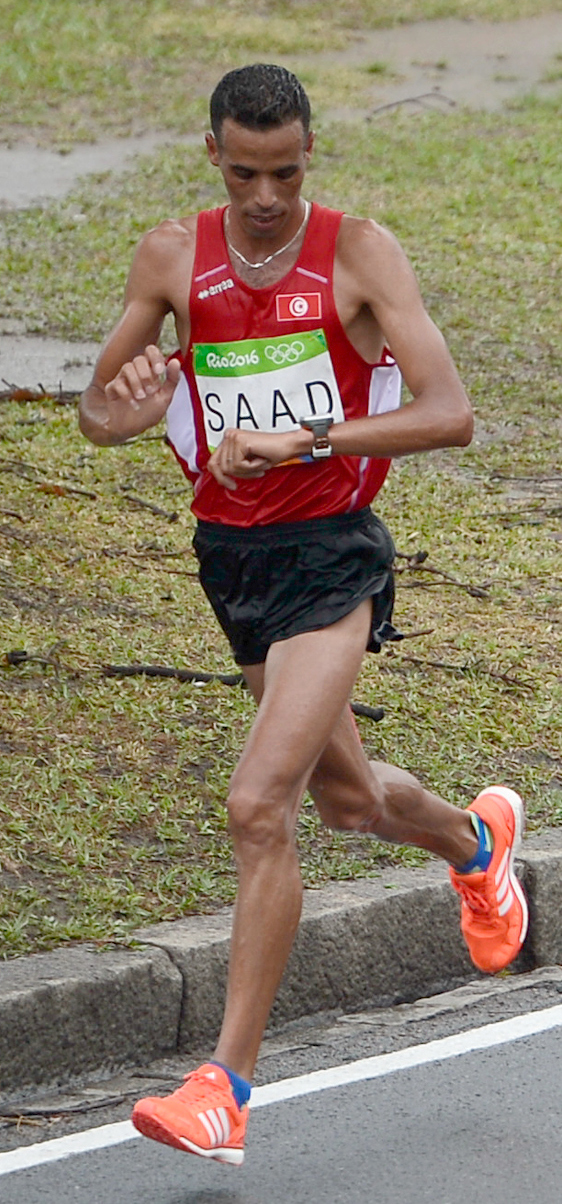
- Saad at the 2016 Olympics

Personal information
- Born: 20 March 1988 (age 38) Gafsa, Tunisia
- Height: 176 cm (5 ft 9 in)
- Weight: 57 kg (126 lb)

Sport
- Sport: Track and field
- Event: Marathon

Achievements and titles
- Personal best: 2:13:51 (2016)

Atef Saad (born 20 March 1988) is a Tunisian long-distance runner. He finished 62nd in the marathon at the 2016 Summer Olympics. In October 2017, Saad won the third edition of the "Run In Carthage".
