= Oleksandr Sitkovskyi =

Ukrainian long-distance runner

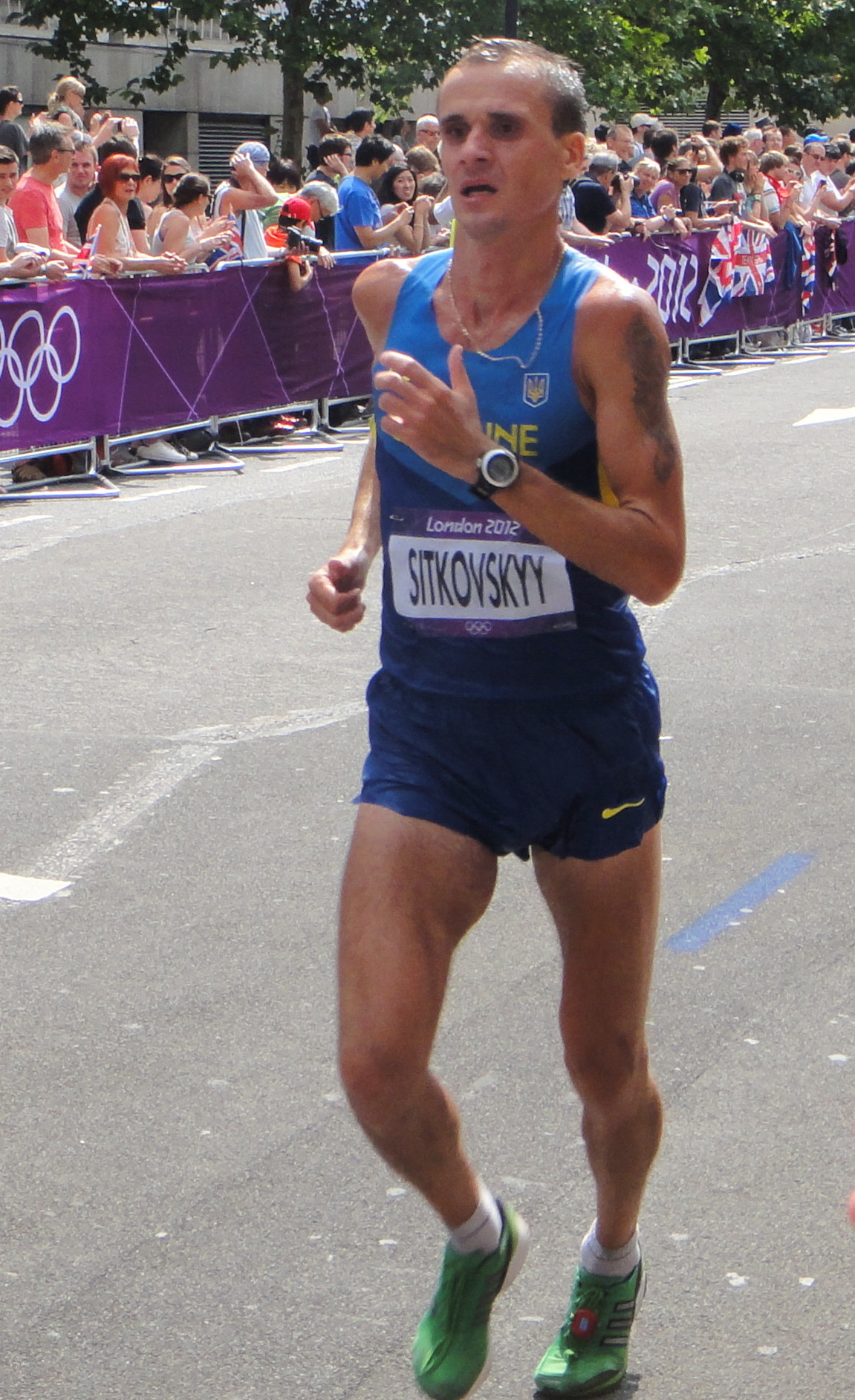
- Sitkovskyy in the marathon at the 2012 Olympics in London

Personal information
- Born: June 9, 1978 (age 47) Zhovti Vody, Ukrainian SSR, Soviet Union
- Height: 1.84 m (6 ft 0 in)
- Weight: 68 kg (150 lb)

Sport
- Country: Ukraine
- Sport: Athletics
- Event: Marathon

Oleksandr Vasyliovych Sitkovskyi (Ukrainian: Олександр Васильович Сітковський, also transliterated Sitkovskyy or Sitkovskiy, born 9 June 1978) is a Ukrainian long-distance runner.

== Career ==
At the 2012 Summer Olympics, he competed in the Men's marathon, finishing in 12th place. He also competed at the 2008 Summer Olympics, but did not finish the course.

In 2021, he competed in the men's marathon at the 2020 Summer Olympics held in Tokyo, Japan.
