= Hakim Sadi =

Algerian long-distance runner

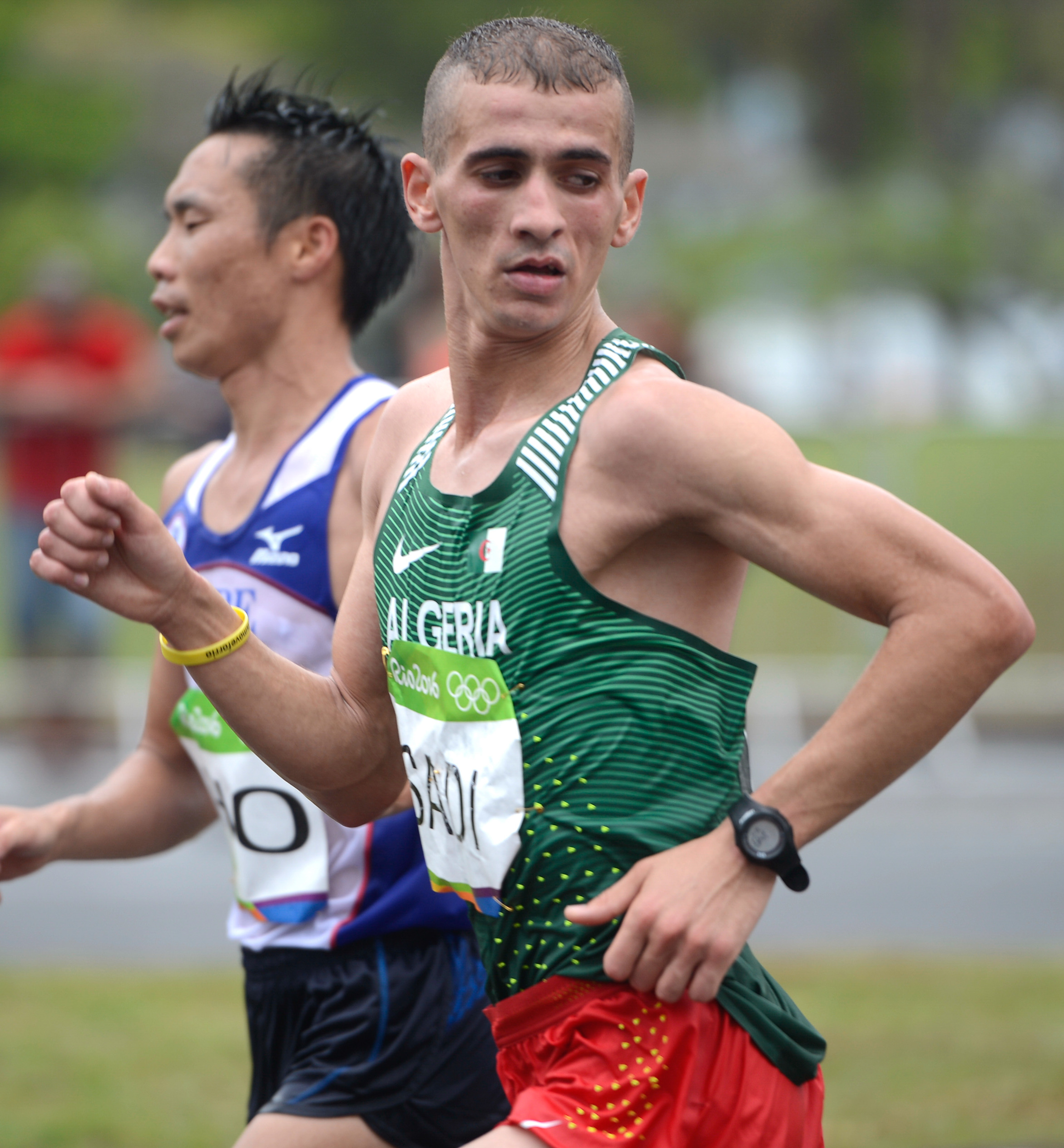
- Sadi at the 2016 Olympics

Personal information
- Native name: حكيم سعدي
- Born: 14 November 1992 (age 33)
- Height: 176 cm (5 ft 9 in)
- Weight: 56 kg (123 lb)

Sport
- Sport: Track and field
- Event: Marathon
- Club: Necira Nounou, Algiers

Achievements and titles
- Personal best: 2:18:22 (2015)

Hakim Sadi (Algerian Arabic: حكيم سعدي; born 14 November 1992) is an Algerian long-distance runner. He placed 104th in the marathon at the 2016 Summer Olympics.
