= Toyo University =

University in Japan

Coordinates: 35.72324°N 139.75044°E

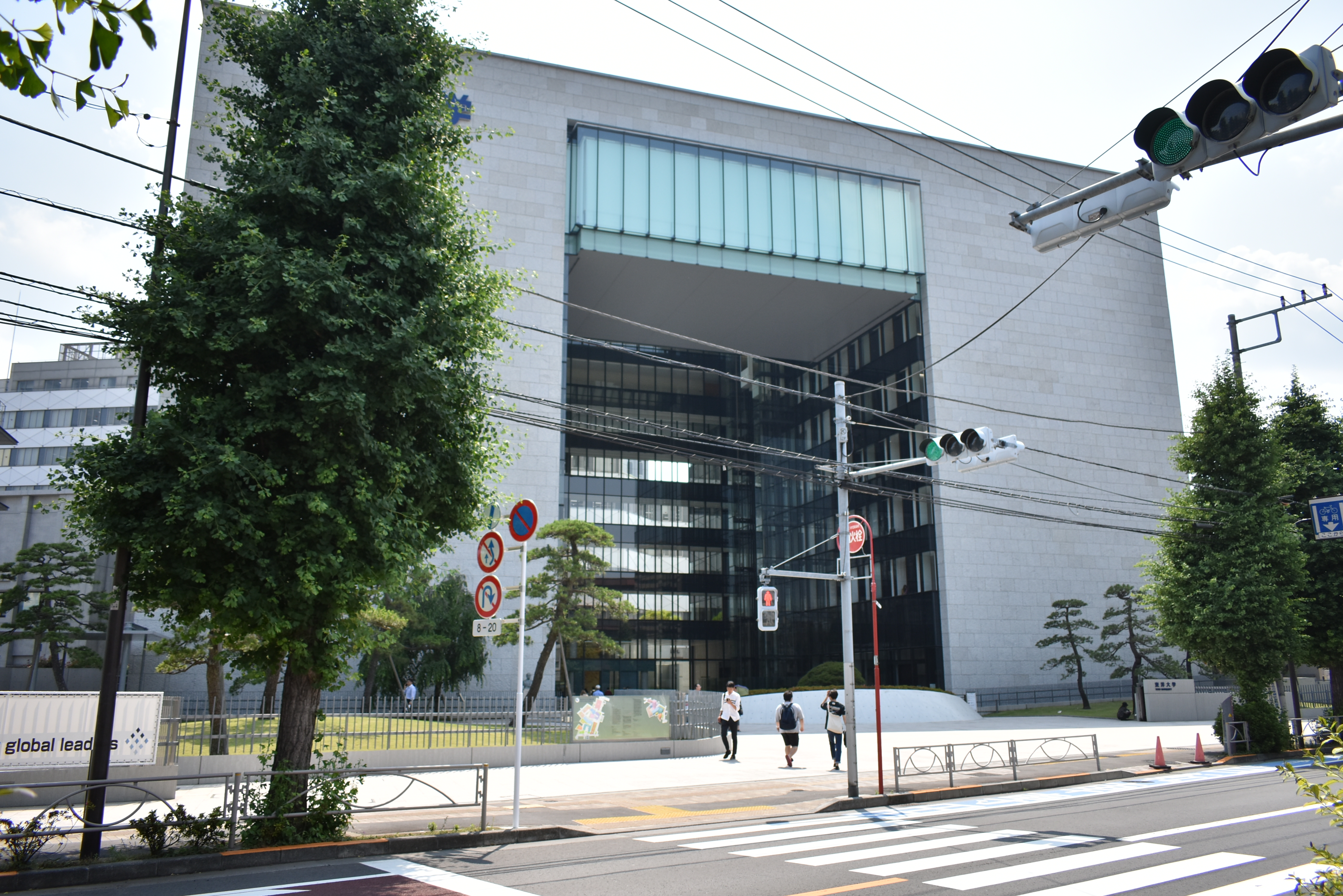
- Motto: Protection of Country and Love of Truth (護國愛理); The basis of all learning lies in philosophy (諸学の基礎は哲学にあり)
- Type: Private
- Established: 1887 (135 years ago)
- President: Etsuko Yaguchi
- Students: 31,640
- Location: Bunkyo, Tokyo, Japan
- Campus: Two urban, three suburban, and one satellite campuses
- Colors: Navy
- Website: www.toyo.ac.jp

Toyo University (東洋大学, Tōyō Daigaku) is a private university with the main Hakusan campus in Bunkyo, Tokyo, Japan. The university operates multiple satellite campuses in the Kanto region, including. Asaka, Kawagoe, Itakura, and Akabane.

The university consists of eleven graduate schools, a law school, eleven undergraduate faculties, forty four departments, various research institutes, and five affiliated high schools, serving a combined student body of more than 30,000 students.

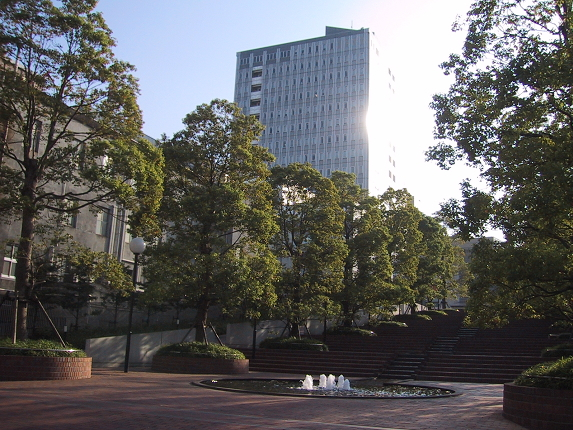
Toyo University, Hakusan Campus

== Overview ==
The predecessor to Toyo University was Shiritsu Tetsugakukan (私立哲学館) (Private School of Philosophy), which was founded at Rinsho-in Temple by Enryo Inoue in 1887. Inoue felt that the subject of philosophy was neglected in Japanese schools of higher learning at the time. In 1906, the school was moved to its present site (Hakusan Campus) and its name was changed to Toyo University. The school's motto was "Protection of Country and Love of Truth" (護國愛理).

Originally, courses were offered in philosophy, religion, ethics, education, Japanese, and classical Chinese, and the school continued to expand over time. In 1949, there was a substantial restructuring of the university, and faculties of Literature, Economics, Law, Sociology, Engineering and Business Administration were established. Faculties of Regional Development Studies and Life Sciences were established in April 1997. A law school was created in April 2004, and a Bio-Nano Electronics Research Centre was founded in 2003.

== Campuses ==
- Hakusan Campus (5-28-20 Hakusan, Bunkyo-ku, Tokyo)
- Akabane Campus (1-7-12 Akabane, Kita-ku, Tokyo)
- Asaka Campus (48-1 Oka, Asaka-shi, Saitama)
- Kawagoe Campus (2100 Kujirai, Kawagoe-shi, Saitama)
- Itakura Campus (1-1-1 Izumino, Itakura-machi, Ora-gun, Gunma)
- Otemachi Satellite Campus (1F, New Otemachi Building, 2-2-1 Otemachi, Chiyoda-ku, Tokyo)
- Sports Center (92-1 Shimizu-cho, Itabashi-ku, Tokyo)
- Bangkok Office (Chulalongkorn University)

== Faculties ==
=== Hakusan Campus ===
- Faculty of Literature (文学部)
  - Department of Philosophy
  - Department of Eastern Philosophy and Culture
  - Department of Japanese Literature and Culture
  - Department of English and American Literature
  - Department of History
  - Department of Education
  - Department of International Culture and Communication Studies
- Faculty of Economics (経済学部)
  - Department of Economics
  - Department of International Economics
  - Department of Policy Studies
- Faculty of Business Administration (経営学部)
  - Department of Business Administration
  - Department of Marketing
  - Department of Accounting and Finance
- Faculty of Law (法学部)
  - Department of Law
  - Department of Business Law
- Faculty of Sociology (社会学部)
  - Department of Sociology
  - Department of Global Diversity Studies
  - Department of Media and Communications
  - Department of Social Psychology
- Faculty of Global and Regional Studies (国際学部)
  - Department of Global Innovation Studies
  - Department of Regional Development Studies
- Faculty of International Tourism Management (国際観光学部)
  - Department of International Tourism Management

=== Akabane Campus ===
- Faculty of Information Networking for Innovation and Design (情報連携学部)
  - Department of Information Networking for Innovation and Design
- Faculty of Health and Sports Sciences (スポーツ健康科学部)
  - Department of Health and Sports Sciences
  - Department of Nutritional Sciences
- Faculty of Design for Welfare Society (福祉社会デザイン学部)
  - Department of Social Welfare Studies
  - Department of Child Studies
  - Department of Human Environment Design

=== Kawagoe Campus ===
- Faculty of Science and Engineering (理工学部)
  - Department of Mechanical Engineering
  - Department of Electrical, Electronic and Communications Engineering
  - Department of Applied Chemistry
  - Department of Civil and Environmental Engineering
  - Department of Architecture
- Faculty of Information Sciences and Arts (総合情報学部)
  - Department of Information Sciences and Arts

=== Asaka Campus ===
- Faculty of Life Sciences (生命科学部)
  - Department of Life Sciences
  - Department of Biomedical Engineering
  - Department of Biological Resources
- Faculty of Food and Nutritional Sciences (食環境科学部)
  - Department of Food and Life Sciences
  - Department of Data Science for Food Systems
  - Department of Nutrition and Health Sciences

=== Graduate Schools ===
- Letters (文学研究科)
- Sociology (社会学研究科)
- Law (法学研究科)
- Business Administration (経営学研究科)
- Economics (経済学研究科)
- Global and Regional Studies (国際学研究科)
- Social Welfare (社会福祉学研究科)
- Human Life Design (ライフデザイン学研究科)
- Health and Sports Sciences (健康スポーツ学研究科)
- Science and Engineering (理工学研究科)
- Information Science and Arts (総合情報学研究科)
- Life Sciences (生命科学研究科)
- Food and Nutritional Sciences (食環境科学研究科)
- Information Networking for Innovation and Design (情報連携学研究科)

== Rankings ==
Toyo University is ranked within the top 73rd in the Japan by the Times Higher Education World University Rankings 2022.

University rankings
Global
THE	General	1501+
Nature Index Academic	Research	2549

Regional
THE Asia (Asia version)	General	601+
QS Asia (Asia version)	General	661-680

National

== External relations ==
- United Kingdom
  - York St John University
  - Cardiff University
- Australia
  - Curtin University
- United States
  - The College of New Jersey
- South Korea
  - Busan University of Foreign Studies
  - Inha University
  - Daegu University
- Thailand
  - Chulalongkorn University
  - Thammasat University
  - Srinakharinwirot University
  - Assumption University (Thailand)
  - Chiang Mai University
  - Asian Institute of Technology
- Indonesia
  - Darma Persada University
- Ukraine
  - National Aviation University
- Uzbekistan
  - Uzbekistan State World Languages University

== Affiliated schools ==
- Toyo University Himeji Junior and Senior High School
- Toyo University Ushiku Junior and Senior High School
- Toyo University Keihoku Junior and Senior High School
- Keihoku Kindergarten

== See also ==
- List of Toyo University people
- List of universities in Japan
