= Methkal Abu Drais =

Jordanian long-distance runner

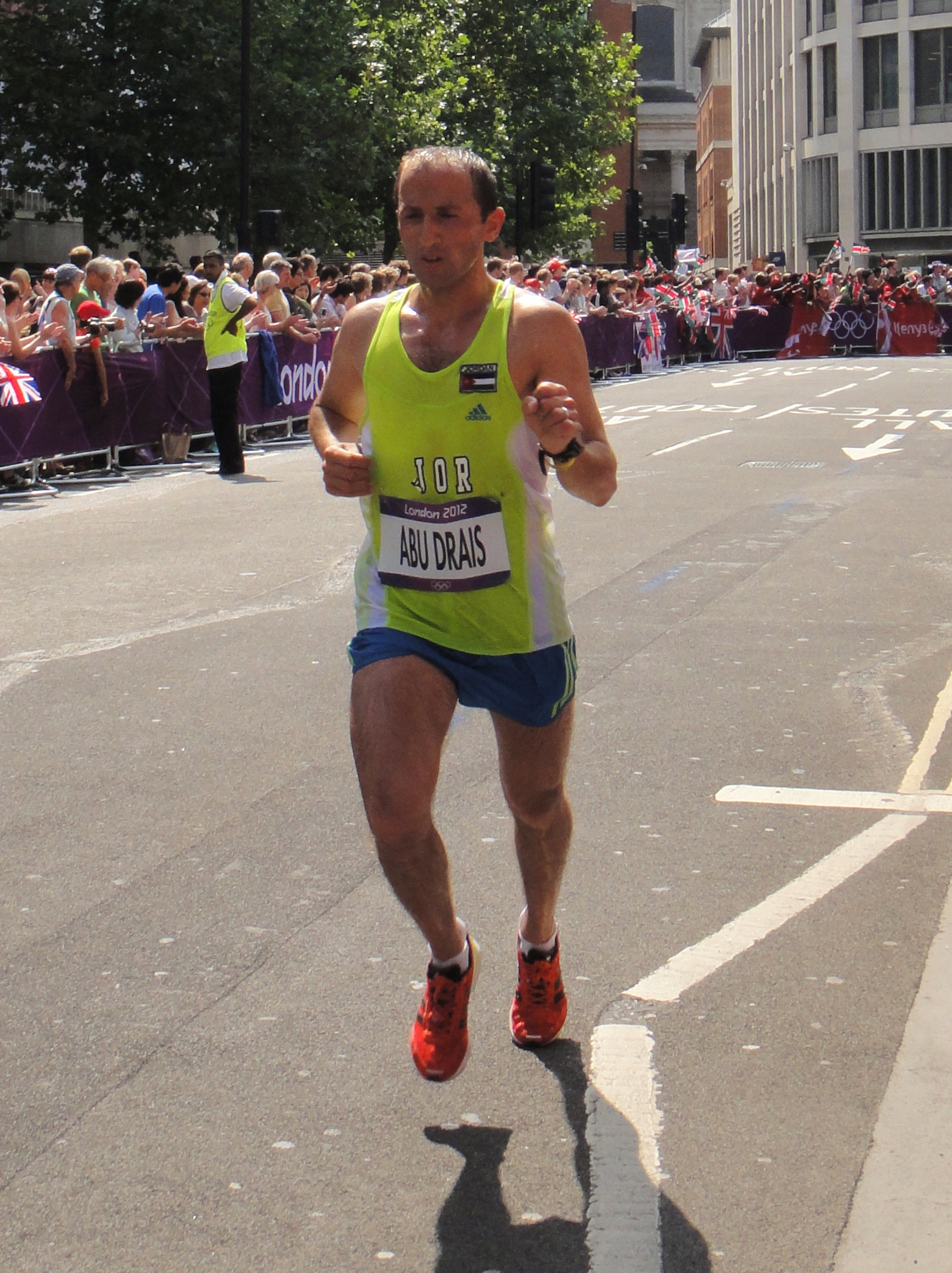
- Methkal Abu Drais in the marathon at the 2012 Summer Olympics in London

Personal information
- Born: 29 December 1983 (age 42)
- Height: 1.68 m (5 ft 6 in)
- Weight: 62 kg (137 lb)

Sport
- Country: Jordan
- Sport: Athletics
- Event: Marathon

Methkal Marouf Abu Drais (born 29 December 1983) is a Jordanian long-distance runner. He was born in Alardah. Abu Drais won the 2012 Stockholm Marathon in a time of 2:19:16 hours. He competed in the marathon at the 2012 Summer Olympics in London and finished in 56th place. Methkal competed in the Marathon at the 2016 Summer Olympics but he did not fare very well being the last finisher in 140th place.
