= Stephen Kiprotich =

Ugandan long-distance runner

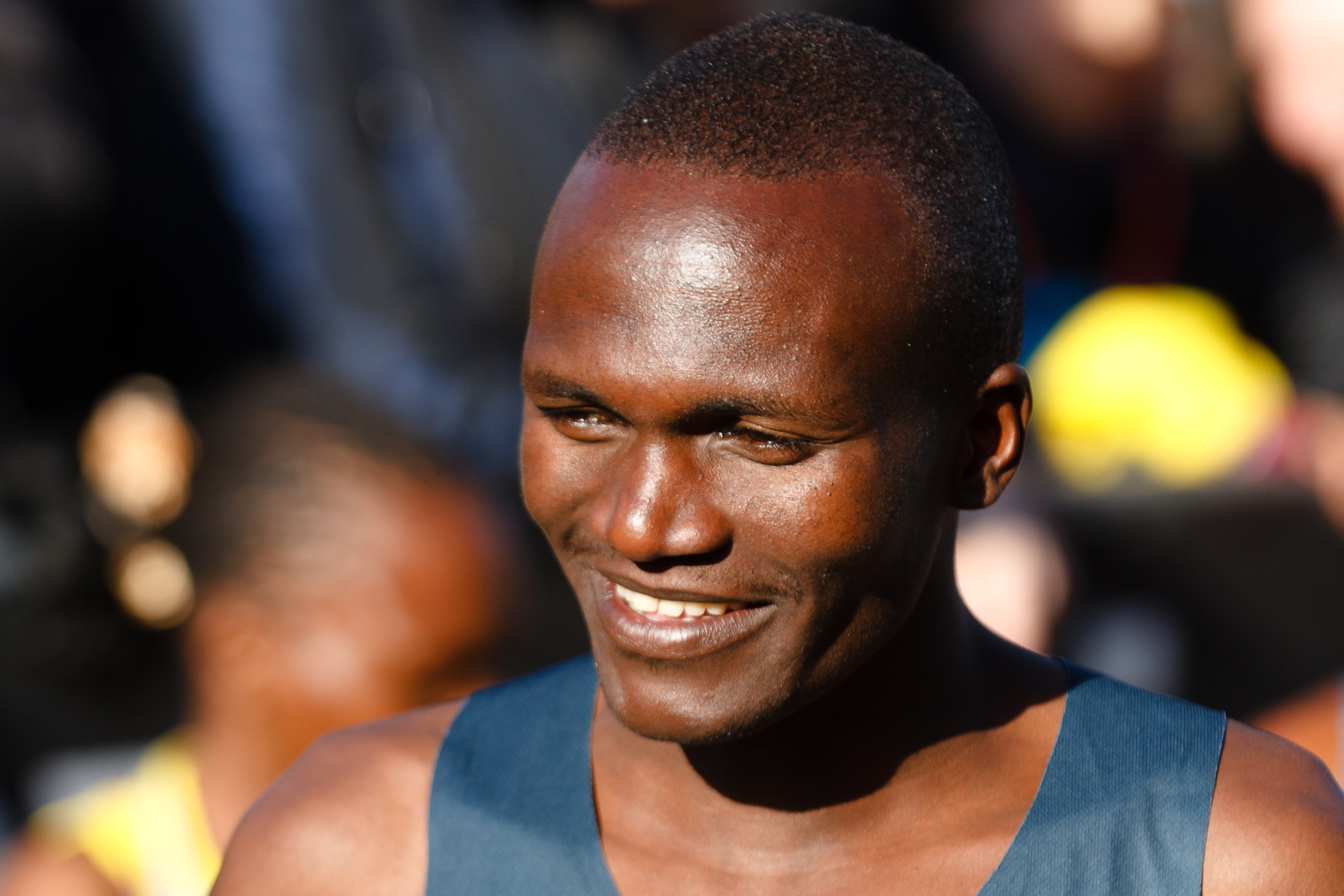
- Kiprotich at the Paris Half Marathon in 2014

Personal information
- Born: 27 February 1989 (age 37) Kapchorwa District, Uganda
- Height: 1.72 m (5 ft 8 in) (2012)
- Weight: 56 kg (123 lb) (2012)

Sport
- Country: Uganda
- Sport: Athletics
- Event: Long-distance running
- Team: NN Running Team

Achievements and titles
- Olympic finals: 2012 London; Marathon, Gold
- Personal bests: Marathon: 2:06:33 (Tokyo 2015); 10,000 m: 27:58.03 (Birmingham 2010); 5000 m: 13:23.70 (Hengelo 2008)
Medal record
Men's athletics
Representing Uganda
Olympic Games
Gold medal – first place	2012 London	Marathon
World Championships
Gold medal – first place	2013 Moscow	Marathon
World Marathon Majors
Silver medal – second place	2015 Tokyo	Marathon

Stephen Kiprotich ("KIP-roh-tich", born 27 February 1989) is a Ugandan long-distance runner. He is an Olympic marathon champion, having won the gold medal at the 2012 London Olympics. Kiprotich also won a gold at the 2013 World Championships in Athletics. After Ethiopia's Gezahegne Abera, he is the second person to follow an Olympic marathon title with a world championship gold medal for the same event.

Kiprotich became 2012 Olympic champion with a winning time of 2:08:01 in hot, sunny, and humid conditions. This was the first Olympic medal for Uganda since 1996, the first Olympic gold medal for the country since 1972, and the country's first-ever medal in the marathon. He won the Moscow IAAF Championship marathon on 17 August 2013.

== Biography ==
Kiprotich is the youngest of seven children of subsistence farmers from Kapchorwa District, near the Uganda-Kenya border. As a child, he missed three years of elementary school due to an undiagnosed illness. From 2004 to 2006, he quit athletics to concentrate on school. Then, at the age of 17, he quit school and moved to the Eldoret region of Kenya, in the Rift Valley, to train for the marathon with Eliud Kipchoge. He was assisted by A Running Start, a non-profit foundation based in New York.

Kiprotich ran a personal best in the marathon of 2:07:20 in 2011 at the Enschede Marathon in the Netherlands, which set a new course record for the Enschede Marathon and a new Ugandan record. He finished third in the 2012 Tokyo Marathon with a time of 2:07:50.

Kiprotich was inspired in part by John Akii-Bua, the only previous Ugandan Olympic gold medallist, who won the 400 metres hurdles at the 1972 Summer Olympics in Munich, Germany setting a new world record in the process. He then went on to win the London 2012 Olympic Marathon, ahead of Kenyan runners Abel Kirui and Wilson Kipsang Kiprotich, who finished second and third, respectively.

In 2012, Kiprotich won the Nile Special-Uspa Sports Personality of the Year award, the Ugandan sports award.

In 2013, he won the IAAF Moscow 2013 Marathon in 2:09:51 to grab the gold medal.

The following year, Kiprotich took part and completed the New York City Marathon in 2:13:25. Wilson Kipsang Kiprotich was the winner in 2:10.59. In February 2015, he ran a new personal best in the marathon of 2:06:33 in finishing second at the Tokyo Marathon.

In 2015, Kiprotich appeared in Jayant Maru's film SIPI the movie, a Ugandan produced film.

In 2016, Stephen Kiprotich ran in his second Olympic marathon at the 2016 Rio de Janeiro Olympic Games; Kiprotich, the defending champion, finished 14th in 2:13:32 in a race won by Kenya's Eliud Kipchoge.

In 2017, he represented Uganda at the 2017 World Cross Country Championships in Kampala, Uganda. Kiprotich finished 17th in a race won by Kenya's Geoffrey Kamworor. He went on to finish second in both the Hamburg Marathon and Fukuoka Marathon, clocking 2:07:31 and 2:07:10, respectively.

The following year, he competed in the Hamburg Marathon and Toronto Waterfront Marathon, finishing off of the podium in fifth and seventh, respectively.

In 2019, Kiprotich was third in the Hamburg Marathon in 2:08:31 and represented Uganda in the men's marathon at the 2019 World Championships in Athletics in Doha, Qatar. Stephen finished 18th in 2:15:04 in a race won by Ethiopia's Lelisa Desisa.

Kiprotich's next marathon was in April 2021 when he finished fifth at the NN Mission Marathon in Enschede, Netherlands in a time of 2:09:04. He was the first Ugandan to finish, beating Geoffrey Kusuro and Ugandan national record holder Felix Chemonges.

Stephen Kiprotich was selected for the Ugandan team in the men's marathon at the 2020 Tokyo Olympic Games. He is expected to compete in August 2021 alongside teammates, Fred Musobo and Felix Chemonges.

Kiprotich is a member of the NN Running Team and trains in Kapchorwa, Uganda.

== See also ==
- Davis Kamoga
- Boniface Kiprop
- Silver Ayoo
