= List of flag bearers for Barbados at the Olympics =

Barbados at the Olympics
- IOC code: BAR
- NOC: Barbados Olympic Association
- Website: www.olympic.org.bb
- Medals: Gold 0 Silver 0 Bronze 1 Total 1

Summer appearances
- 1968; 1972; 1976; 1980; 1984; 1988; 1992; 1996; 2000; 2004; 2008; 2012; 2016; 2020; 2024

Other related appearances
- British West Indies (1960 S)

This is a list of flag bearers who have represented Barbados at the Olympics.

Flag bearers carry the national flag of their country at the opening ceremony of the Olympic Games.

#	Event year	Season	Flag bearer	Sport
1	1968	Summer		
2	1972	Summer	Anthony Phillips	Weightlifting
3	1976	Summer	Lorna Forde	Athletics
4	1984	Summer	Charles Pile	Cycling
5	1988	Summer	Elvis Forde	Athletics
6	1992	Summer		
7	1996	Summer	Obadele Thompson	Athletics
8	2000	Summer	Andrea Blackett	Athletics
9	2004	Summer	Michael Maskell	Shooting
10	2008	Summer	Bradley Ally	Swimming
11	2012	Summer	Ryan Brathwaite	Athletics
12	2016	Summer	Ramon Gittens	Athletics
13	2020	Summer	Alex Sobers	Swimming
13	2020	Summer	Danielle Titus	Swimming
14	2024	Summer	Jack Kirby	Swimming
14	2024	Summer	Sada Williams	Athletics

== See also ==
- Barbados at the Olympics
