= Barbados at the 1996 Summer Olympics =

- IOC code: BAR
- NOC: Barbados Olympic Association
- Website: www.olympic.org.bb

in Atlanta
- Competitors: 13 (11 men and 2 women) in 7 sports
- Flag bearer: Obadele Thompson
- Medals: Gold 0 Silver 0 Bronze 0 Total 0

Summer Olympics appearances (overview)
- 1968; 1972; 1976; 1980; 1984; 1988; 1992; 1996; 2000; 2004; 2008; 2012; 2016; 2020; 2024

Other related appearances
- British West Indies (1960 S)

Barbados competed at the 1996 Summer Olympics in Atlanta, United States.

== Competitors ==
The following is the list of number of competitors in the Games.

Sport	Men	Women	Total
Athletics	3	1	4
Boxing	2	–	2
Gymnastics	1	0	1
Judo	1	0	1
Sailing	2	0	2
Shooting	1	0	1
Swimming	1	1	2
Total	11	2	13

== Results by event ==
=== Athletics ===
Men's 100 metres

- Obadele Thompson
- Kirk Cummins

Men's 200 metres

- Obadele Thompson

Men's Decathlon

- Victor Houston

Women's 400 metres

- Melissa Straker
  - Heat — 52.92 (→ did not advance)

=== Boxing ===
Men's Featherweight (– 57 kg)

- John Kelman
  - First Round — Lost to János Nagy (Hungary), referee stopped contest in third round

Men's Middleweight (– 75 kg)

- Thomas Marcus
  - First Round — Lost to Mohamed Bahari (Algeria), referee stopped contest in second round (02:20)

=== Gymnastics ===
- Shane de Freitas

=== Judo ===
- Andrew Payne

=== Sailing ===
- O'Neal Marshall
- Rodney Reader

=== Shooting ===
- Michael Maskell

=== Swimming ===
Men's 100m Backstroke

- Nick Neckles
  - Heat – 57.91 (→ did not advance, 37th place)

Men's 200m Backstroke

- Nick Neckles
  - Heat – 2:05.88 (→ did not advance, 28th place)

Women's 50m Freestyle

- Leah Martindale
  - Heat – 25.76
  - Final – 25.49 (→ 5th place)

Women's 100m Freestyle

- Leah Martindale
  - Heat – 56.13
  - B-Final – 56.03 (→ 12th place)

== See also ==
- Barbados at the 1995 Pan American Games
