= Barbados at the 2000 Summer Olympics =

- IOC code: BAR
- NOC: Barbados Olympic Association
- Website: www.olympic.org.bb

in Sydney
- Competitors: 18 (12 men and 6 women) in 6 sports
- Flag bearer: Andrea Blackett
- Medals Ranked 71st: Gold 0 Silver 0 Bronze 1 Total 1

Summer Olympics appearances (overview)
- 1968; 1972; 1976; 1980; 1984; 1988; 1992; 1996; 2000; 2004; 2008; 2012; 2016; 2020; 2024

Other related appearances
- British West Indies (1960 S)

Barbados competed at the 2000 Summer Olympics in Sydney, Australia. The nation won its first and only Olympic medal (for now) at these Games.

== Medalists ==
Medal	Name	Sport	Event	Date
Bronze	Obadele Thompson	Athletics	Men's 100 metres	23 September

== Competitors ==
The following is the list of number of competitors in the Games.

Sport	Men	Women	Total
Athletics	6	5	11
Boxing	1	–	1
Judo	1	0	1
Sailing	1	0	1
Shooting	1	0	1
Swimming	2	1	3
Total	12	6	18

== Athletics ==
Key

- Note–Ranks given for track events are within the athlete's heat only
- Q = Qualified for the next round
- q = Qualified for the next round as a fastest loser or, in field events, by position without achieving the qualifying target
- NR = National record
- N/A = Round not applicable for the event
- Bye = Athlete not required to compete in round

Men
Track and road events

Athletes	Events	Heat Round 1		Heat Round 2		Semifinal		Final	
Athletes	Events	Time	Rank	Time	Rank	Time	Rank	Time	Rank
Obadele Thompson	100 metres	10.23	5 Q	10.04	1 Q	10.15	5 Q	10.04	3rd place, bronze medalist(s)
Obadele Thompson	200 metres	20.69	12 Q	20.16	4 Q	20.21	5 Q	20.20	4
Fabian Rollins	400 metres	46.85	54	Did not advance					
Milton Browne	800 metres	1:47.63	26	—		Did not advance			
Gabriel Burnett	110 metres hurdles	14.23	36	Did not advance					
Victor Houston	110 metres hurdles	14.06	33	Did not advance					
Victor Houston	400 metres hurdles	51.51	49	—		Did not advance			
Wilan Louis; Victor Houston; Gabriel Burnett; Fabian Rollins	4 × 100 metres relay	40.38	37	—		Did not advance			

Women
Track and road events

Athletes	Events	Heat Round 1		Heat Round 2		Semifinal		Final	
Athletes	Events	Time	Rank	Time	Rank	Time	Rank	Time	Rank
Joanne Durant	100 metres	11.82	52	Did not advance					
Joanne Durant	200 metres	23.90	42	Did not advance					
Tanya Oxley	400 metres	54.22	41	Did not advance					
Andrea Blackett	400 metres hurdles	56.31	14 q	—		55.30	11	Did not advance	
Melissa Straker; Andrea Blackett; Sherline Williams; Tanya Oxley	4 × 400 metres relay	3:30.83	14	—				Did not advance	

== Boxing ==
Men

Athlete	Event	Round of 32	Round of 16	Quarterfinals	Semifinals	Final	
Athlete	Event	Opposition Result	Opposition Result	Opposition Result	Opposition Result	Opposition Result	Rank
Shawn Cox	Light heavyweight	Dovi (FRA); L 10–14	Did not advance				

== Judo ==
Men

Athlete	Event	Round of 32	Round of 16	Quarterfinals	Semifinals	Repechage 1	Repechage 2	Repechage 3	Final / BM	
Athlete	Event	Opposition Result	Opposition Result	Opposition Result	Opposition Result	Opposition Result	Opposition Result	Opposition Result	Opposition Result	Rank
Andrew Payne	−73 kg	Alquati (ARG); L	Did not advance							

== Sailing ==
Men

Athlete	Event	Race											Points	Rank
Athlete	Event	1	2	3	4	5	6	7	8	9	10	11	Points	Rank
O'Neal Marshall	Mistral	~~37~~	32	32	~~34~~	31	34	32	31	31	31	33	287	34

== Shooting ==
Men

Athlete	Event	Qualification		Final	
Athlete	Event	Points	Rank	Total	Rank
Michael Maskell	Skeet	119	23	Did not advance	

== Swimming ==
Men

Athlete	Event	Heat		Semifinal		Final	
Athlete	Event	Time	Rank	Time	Rank	Time	Rank
Damian Alleyne	200 m freestyle	1:52.75	27	Did not advance			
Damian Alleyne	400 m freestyle	3:58.12	26	—		Did not advance	
Nicholas Neckles	100 m backstroke	1:00.19	51	Did not advance			

Women

Athlete	Event	Heat		Semifinal		Final	
Athlete	Event	Time	Rank	Time	Rank	Time	Rank
Leah Martindale	50 m freestyle	26.05	23	Did not advance			
Leah Martindale	100 m freestyle	57.21	24	Did not advance			

== See also ==
- Barbados at the 1999 Pan American Games
