= Barbados at the 2016 Summer Olympics =

- IOC code: BAR
- NOC: Barbados Olympic Association
- Website: www.olympic.org.bb

in Rio de Janeiro
- Competitors: 12 in 5 sports
- Flag bearer: Ramon Gittens
- Medals: Gold 0 Silver 0 Bronze 0 Total 0

Summer Olympics appearances (overview)
- 1968; 1972; 1976; 1980; 1984; 1988; 1992; 1996; 2000; 2004; 2008; 2012; 2016; 2020; 2024

Other related appearances
- British West Indies (1960 S)

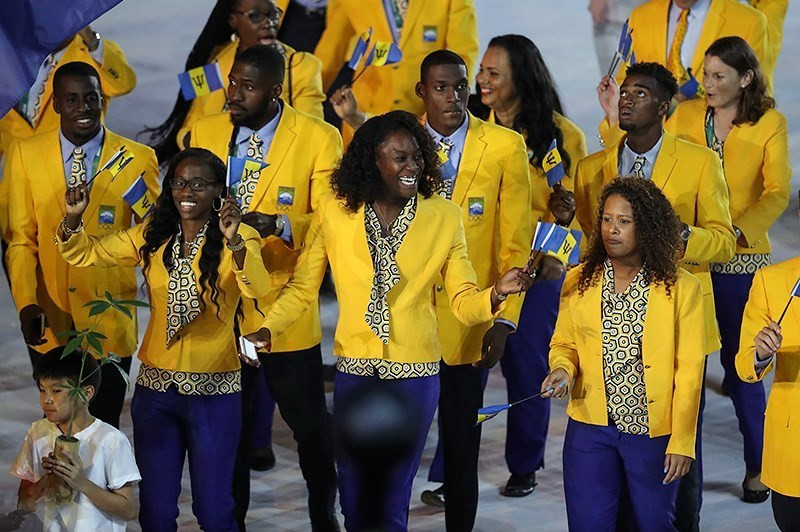
Barbados at the 2016 Summer Olympics opening ceremony.

Barbados competed at the 2016 Summer Olympics in Rio de Janeiro, Brazil, from 5 to 21 August 2016. This was the nation's twelfth appearance at the Summer Olympics, with the exception of the 1980 Summer Olympics in Moscow, because of its partial support to the United States-led boycott.

The Barbados Olympic Association registered a total of 12 athletes, 7 men and 5 women, to compete in five different sports at these Games, doubling the nation's roster size from London 2012. Among the sports played by the athletes, Barbados marked its Olympic debut in tennis and triathlon, and the return of females to the team for the first time after sending only men to the previous Games.

The Barbadian team featured only two returning Olympians; skeet shooter Michael Maskell, who staged a comeback in Rio for his fifth Olympic appearance as the most experienced member after a twelve-year absence, and sprinter Ramon Gittens, who became the nation's flag bearer in the opening ceremony.

Barbados, however, failed to win a single Olympic medal since the 2000 Summer Olympics in Sydney, where sprinter Obadele Thompson took the bronze in the men's 100 metres.

== Athletics (track and field) ==
Barbadian athletes have so far achieved qualifying standards in the following athletics events (up to a maximum of 3 athletes in each event):

Key

- Note–Ranks given for track events are within the athlete's heat only
- Q = Qualified for the next round
- q = Qualified for the next round as a fastest loser or, in field events, by position without achieving the qualifying target
- NR = National record
- N/A = Round not applicable for the event
- Bye = Athlete not required to compete in round

Track & road events

| Athlete | Event | Heat | | Quarterfinal | | Semifinal | | Final | |
| Athlete | Event | Result | Rank | Result | Rank | Result | Rank | Result | Rank |
|---|---|---|---|---|---|---|---|---|---|
| Ramon Gittens | Men's 100 m | Bye | | 10.25 | 4 | Did not advance | | | |
| Levi Cadogan | Men's 200 m | 21.02 | 7 | — | | Did not advance | | | |
| Burkheart Ellis | Men's 200 m | 20.74 | 4 | — | | Did not advance | | | |
| Ramon Gittens | Men's 200 m | 20.58 | 3 | — | | Did not advance | | | |
| Kierre Beckles | Women's 100 m hurdles | 13.01 | 6 | — | | Did not advance | | | |
| Tia-Adana Belle | Women's 400 m hurdles | 56.68 | 4 | — | | Did not advance | | | |

Field events

| Athlete | Event | Qualification | | Final | |
| Athlete | Event | Distance | Position | Distance | Position |
|---|---|---|---|---|---|
| Akela Jones | Women's high jump | 1.85 | 31 | Did not advance | |

Combined events – Women's heptathlon

| Athlete | Event | 100H | HJ | SP | 200 m | LJ | JT | 800 m | Final | Rank |
|---|---|---|---|---|---|---|---|---|---|---|
| Akela Jones | Result | 13.00 | 1.89 | 14.09 | 24.35 | 6.30 | 42.00 | 2:41.12 | 6173 | 20 |
| Akela Jones | Points | 1124 | 1093 | 800 | 947 | 943 | 706 | 560 | 6173 | 20 |

== Shooting ==
Barbados has received an invitation from the Tripartite Commission to send Michael Maskell, who will compete at his fifth Olympics, in the men's skeet, as long as the minimum qualifying score (MQS) was met by 31 March 2016. This also signified the nation's comeback to the sport for the first time since 2004.

| Athlete | Event | Qualification | | Semifinal | | Final | |
| Athlete | Event | Points | Rank | Points | Rank | Points | Rank |
|---|---|---|---|---|---|---|---|
| Michael Maskell | Men's skeet | 118 | 18 | Did not advance | | | |

Qualification Legend: Q = Qualify for the next round; q = Qualify for the bronze medal (shotgun)

== Swimming ==
Barbados has received a Universality invitation from FINA to send two swimmers (one male and one female) to the Olympics.

| Athlete | Event | Heat | | Final | |
| Athlete | Event | Time | Rank | Time | Rank |
|---|---|---|---|---|---|
| Alex Sobers | Men's 400 m freestyle | 3:59.97 | 44 | Did not advance | |
| Lani Cabrera | Women's 400 m freestyle | 4:28.95 | 30 | Did not advance | |

== Tennis ==
Barbados has received an invitation from the Tripartite Commission to send Darian King (world no. 278) in the men's singles into the Olympic tennis tournament, signifying the nation's debut in the sport.

| Athlete | Event | Round of 64 | Round of 32 | Round of 16 | Quarterfinals | Semifinals | Final / BM | |
| Athlete | Event | Opposition Score | Opposition Score | Opposition Score | Opposition Score | Opposition Score | Opposition Score | Rank |
|---|---|---|---|---|---|---|---|---|
| Darian King | Men's singles | Johnson (USA); L 3–6, 2–6 | Did not advance | | | | | |

== Triathlon ==
Barbados has entered one triathlete to compete at the Games, signifying the nation's Olympic debut in the sport. Jason Wilson was ranked among the top 40 eligible triathletes in the men's event based on the ITU Olympic Qualification List as of 15 May 2016.

| Athlete | Event | Swim (1.5 km) | Trans 1 | Bike (40 km) | Trans 2 | Run (10 km) | Total Time | Rank |
|---|---|---|---|---|---|---|---|---|
| Jason Wilson | Men's | 17:31 | 0:49 | Did not finish | | | | |

== See also ==
- Barbados at the 2015 Pan American Games
