= Barbados at the 1968 Summer Olympics =

- IOC code: BAR
- NOC: Barbados Olympic Association

in Mexico City
- Competitors: 9 (men) in 5 sports
- Medals: Gold 0 Silver 0 Bronze 0 Total 0

Summer Olympics appearances (overview)
- 1968; 1972; 1976; 1980; 1984; 1988; 1992; 1996; 2000; 2004; 2008; 2012; 2016; 2020; 2024; 2028

Other related appearances
- British West Indies (1960 S)

Barbados competed in the Summer Olympic Games for the first time at the 1968 Summer Olympics in Mexico City, Mexico. Nine competitors, all men, took part in ten events in five sports.

== Athletics ==
- Ezra Burnham
- Hadley Hinds

== Cycling ==
Four cyclists represented Barbados in 1968.

Individual road race

- Colin Forde
- Kensley Reece
- Richard Roett
- Michael Stoute

Sprint

- Kensley Reece

1000m time trial

- Kensley Reece

Individual pursuit

- Colin Forde

== Shooting ==
One shooter represented Barbados in 1968.

50 m rifle, prone

- Milton Tucker

== Swimming ==
Men

Athlete	Event	Heat		Semifinal		Final	
Athlete	Event	Time	Rank	Time	Rank	Time	Rank
Angus Edghill	100 m freestyle	58.1	47	Did not advance			
Angus Edghill	200 m freestyle	2:19.1	55	—N/a		Did not advance	

== Weightlifting ==
- Anthony Phillips
