= Barbados at the 1984 Summer Olympics =

- IOC code: BAR
- NOC: Barbados Olympic Association

in Los Angeles
- Competitors: 16 (13 men, 3 women) in 6 sports
- Flag bearer: Charles Pile
- Medals: Gold 0 Silver 0 Bronze 0 Total 0

Summer Olympics appearances (overview)
- 1968; 1972; 1976; 1980; 1984; 1988; 1992; 1996; 2000; 2004; 2008; 2012; 2016; 2020; 2024

Other related appearances
- British West Indies (1960 S)

Barbados competed at the 1984 Summer Olympics in Los Angeles, United States. The nation returned to the Olympic Games after participating in the American-led boycott of the 1980 Summer Olympics. Sixteen competitors, thirteen men and three women, took part in sixteen events in six sports.

== Athletics ==
Men's 400 metres

- Elvis Forde
  - Heat – 45.47
  - Quarterfinals – 45.60
  - Semifinals – 45.32 (→ did not advance)
- David Peltier
  - Heat – 46.57
  - Quarterfinals – 46.48 (→ did not advance)
- Richard Louis
  - Heat – 46.70 (→ did not advance)

Women's 400m Hurdles

- Cheryl Blackman
  - Heat – 1:01.19 (→ did not advance)
- Carlon Blackman
- Clyde Edwards
- Hamil Grimes
- Anthony Jones
- John Mayers

== Boxing ==
- Edward Neblett
- Ed Pollard

== Cycling ==
One cyclist represented Barbados in 1984.

Sprint

- Charles Pile

1000m time trial

- Charles Pile

== Sailing ==
- Bruce Bayley
- Howard Palmer

== Swimming ==
Men's 200m Butterfly

- Harry Wozniak
  - Heat – 2:13.17 (→ did not advance, 31st place)

Men's 200m Individual Medley

- Harry Wozniak
  - Heat – 2:22.49 (→ did not advance, 37th place)

Men's 400m Individual Medley

- Harry Wozniak
  - Heat – 4:53.87 (→ did not advance, 18th place)

== Synchronized swimming ==
- Chemene Sinson
