= Barbados at the Olympics =

- IOC code: BAR
- NOC: Barbados Olympic Association
- Website: www.olympic.org.bb
- Medals Ranked 151st: Gold 0 Silver 0 Bronze 1 Total 1

Summer appearances
- 1968; 1972; 1976; 1980; 1984; 1988; 1992; 1996; 2000; 2004; 2008; 2012; 2016; 2020; 2024; 2028

Other related appearances
- British West Indies (1960 S)

Barbados first competed at the Summer Olympic Games in 1968, and has participated in each Games since, with the exception of the 1980 Summer Olympics when Barbados joined the American-led boycott. Barbados has never competed in the Winter Olympic Games. The country's only Olympic medal is a bronze, won by sprinter Obadele Thompson in the men's 100 metres at the 2000 Summer Olympics.

Barbados competed as part of the West Indies Federation in 1960. Barbadian athlete James Wedderburn was part of the 4 × 400 m relay team which won the bronze medal that year. Weightlifter Grantley Sobers also competed in 1960.

== Timeline of participation ==
Olympic Year/s	Teams		
1960	British West Indies		
1964	Jamaica	Trinidad and Tobago	
1968–present	Jamaica	Trinidad and Tobago	Barbados

== Medal tables ==
=== Medals by Summer Games ===
Games	Athletes	Gold	Silver	Bronze	Total	Rank
1960 Rome	as part of the British West Indies					
1964 Tokyo	did not participate					
1968 Mexico City	9	0	0	0	0	–
1972 Munich	13	0	0	0	0	–
1976 Montreal	11	0	0	0	0	–
1980 Moscow	boycotted					
1984 Los Angeles	16	0	0	0	0	–
1988 Seoul	17	0	0	0	0	–
1992 Barcelona	17	0	0	0	0	–
1996 Atlanta	13	0	0	0	0	–
2000 Sydney	18	0	0	1	1	71
2004 Athens	10	0	0	0	0	–
2008 Beijing	8	0	0	0	0	–
2012 London	6	0	0	0	0	–
2016 Rio de Janeiro	12	0	0	0	0	–
2020 Tokyo	8	0	0	0	0	–
2024 Paris	4	0	0	0	0	–
2028 Los Angeles	future event					
2032 Brisbane	future event					
Total		0	0	1	1	151

=== Medals by sport ===
Sport	Gold	Silver	Bronze	Total
Athletics	0	0	1	1
Totals (1 entries)	0	0	1	1

== List of medalists ==
Medal	Name	Games	Sport	Event
Bronze	Obadele Thompson	2000 Sydney	Athletics	Men's 100 metres

== See also ==
- Sport in Barbados
- Category:Olympic competitors for Barbados
- Barbados at the Commonwealth Games
- Barbados at the Paralympics
- British West Indies at the 1960 Summer Olympics
- List of flag bearers for Barbados at the Olympics
