= Barbados at the 2020 Summer Olympics =

- Flag of Barbados
- IOC code: BAR
- NOC: Barbados Olympic Association
- Website: www.olympic.org.bb

in Tokyo, Japan July 23, 2021 – August 8, 2021
- Competitors: 8 in 2 sports
- Flag bearers (opening): Danielle Titus; Alex Sobers
- Flag bearer (closing): Tia-Adana Belle
- Medals: Gold 0 Silver 0 Bronze 0 Total 0

Summer Olympics appearances (overview)
- 1968; 1972; 1976; 1980; 1984; 1988; 1992; 1996; 2000; 2004; 2008; 2012; 2016; 2020; 2024

Other related appearances
- British West Indies (1960 S)

Barbados competed at the 2020 Summer Olympics in Tokyo. Originally scheduled to take place from 24 July to 9 August 2020, the Games were postponed to 23 July to 8 August 2021, because of the COVID-19 pandemic. It was the nation's fourteenth appearance at the Summer Olympics, since its debut at the 1968 Summer Olympics in Mexico City. The Barbados delegation consisted of eight athletes competing in two sports, and none of them won any medals at the Games.

== Background ==
The National Olympic Committee of Barbados was formed in 1955 and recognized by the International Olympic Committee (IOC) on 17 June of the same year at the IOC session in Paris. It competed in the 1960 Summer Olympics as a part of the West Indies Federation under the name British West Indies. After the West Indies Federation was dissolved in 1962, the newly formed Barbados Olympic Association was granted recognition by the IOC on 5 June 1962 at the IOC session in Moscow. Barbados competed as an independent nation for the first time in the 1968 Summer Olympics in Mexico City. Since then, it has competed at every Olympic Games, except for the 1980 Summer Olympics at Moscow. The 2020 Summer Olympics was the nation's fourteenth appearance at the Summer Olympics. It has previously won a single bronze medal at the 2000 Summer Olympics.

The 2020 Summer Olympics was held in Tokyo, Japan, between 23 July and 8 August 2021. Originally scheduled to take place from 24 July to 9 August 2020, the Games were postponed due to the COVID-19 pandemic. For the first time, the International Olympic Committee invited each National Olympic Committee to select one female and one male athlete to jointly carry their flag during the opening ceremony. Swimmers Danielle Titus and Alex Sobers were the country's flag bearers at the opening ceremony. Athlete Tia-Adana Belle carried the flag at the closing ceremony. Barbados did not win a medal at the Games.

== Competitors ==
The Barbados delegation consisted of eight athletes.

Sport	Men	Women	Total
Athletics	3	3	6
Swimming	1	1	2
Total	4	4	8

== Athletics ==
=== Qualification ===
As per the governing body World Athletics (WA), a NOC was allowed to enter up to three qualified athletes in each individual event if the Olympic Qualifying Standards (OQS) for the respective events had been met during the qualifying period. The remaining places were allocated based on the World Athletics Rankings which were derived from the average of the best five results for an athlete over the designated qualifying period, weighted by the importance of the meet.

Barbados qualified six athletes across four events. Tristan Evelyn qualified for the women's 100 meters event by meeting the entry standard of 11.15 seconds after she set a new national record of 11.14 seconds at the 2021 American Athletic Conference Championship. Jonathan Jones qualified for the men's 400 meters event by meeting the qualifying mark at the 2019 NCAA Outdoor Track and Field Championships. In the men's events, Mario Burke qualified for the 100 meters event and Shane Brathwaite qualified for the 110 meters hurdles through world ranking. In the women's category, Sada Williams and Tia-Adana Belle qualified for the women's 400 meters and 400 meters hurdles events respectively by virtue of their world ranking.

=== Main event ===
The athletics events were held at the Japan National Stadium in Tokyo. In the men's 100 m heats, Burke did not advance to the semifinals after he suffered a hamstring injury and hobbled to the finish line in 15.86 seconds. Evelyn finished sixth in the third heat of the women's 100 m with a time of 11.42 seconds and did not advance to the semifinals. In the men's 400 m, Jones finished second in his heat with a season's best time of 45.04 seconds to advance to the semifinals, where he placed eighth in 45.61 seconds and did not advance to the final.

Williams finished third in the first heat of the women's 400 m in 51.36 seconds to advance to the semifinals. In the semifinals, she set a new national record of 50.11 seconds to finish third, though this was not fast enough to reach the final, as she was placed ninth overall. In the men's 110 m hurdles, Brathwaite finished sixth in the heats with a time of 13.64 seconds and did not advance to the semifinals. Belle finished second in the preliminary heat for the women's 400 m hurdles with a season's best 55.49 seconds to advance to the semifinals, but did not advance to the final.

Key

- Note–Ranks given for track events are within the athlete's heat only
- Q = Qualified for the next round
- q = Qualified for the next round as a fastest loser or, in field events, by position without achieving the qualifying target
- NR = National record
- N/A = Round not applicable for the event
- Bye = Athlete not required to compete in round

Track & road events

Athlete	Event	Heat		Quarterfinal		Semifinal		Final	
Athlete	Event	Result	Rank	Result	Rank	Result	Rank	Result	Rank
Mario Burke	Men's 100 m	Bye		15.81	9	Did not advance			
Jonathan Jones	Men's 400 m	45.04 SB	2 Q	—N/a		45.61	8	Did not advance	
Shane Brathwaite	Men's 110 m hurdles	13.64	6	—N/a		Did not advance			
Tristan Evelyn	Women's 100 m	Bye		11.42	6	Did not advance			
Sada Williams	Women's 400 m	51.36 SB	3 Q	—N/a		50.11 NR	3	Did not advance	
Tia-Adana Belle	Women's 400 m hurdles	55.69 SB	2 Q	—N/a		59.26	8	Did not advance	

== Swimming ==
As per the Fédération internationale de natation (FINA) guidelines, a NOC was permitted to enter a maximum of two qualified athletes in each individual event, who have achieved the Olympic Qualifying Time (OQT). If the quota was not filled, one athlete per event was allowed to enter per NOC, provided they achieved the Olympic Selection Time (OST) in competitions approved by World Aquatics in the period between 1 March 2019 to 27 June 2021. If the overeall quota was not met, FINA allowed NOCs to enter one swimmer per gender under a universality place even if they have not achieved the standard entry times (OQT/OST). Barbados received a universality invitation from FINA to send two top-ranked swimmers (one per gender) in their respective individual events to the Olympics, based on the FINA points as on 28 June 2021.

The swimming events were held at the Tokyo Aquatics Centre. Danielle Titus competed in the women's 100 metre backstroke and Alex Sobers competed in the men's 200 metre freestyle and men's 400 metre freestyle events, and neither advanced past the heats. This was the second consecutive Olympic appearance for Sobers after his debut at the 2016 Summer Olympics, and the only Olympic appearance for Titus.

Athlete	Event	Heat		Semifinal		Final	
Athlete	Event	Time	Rank	Time	Rank	Time	Rank
Alex Sobers	Men's 200 m freestyle	1:48.09	29	Did not advance			
Alex Sobers	Men's 400 m freestyle	3:59.14	34	—N/a		Did not advance	
Danielle Titus	Women's 100 m backstroke	1:04.53	37	Did not advance			

== See also ==
- Barbados at the 2019 Pan American Games
