= Barbados at the 2004 Summer Olympics =

- IOC code: BAR
- NOC: Barbados Olympic Association
- Website: www.olympic.org.bb

in Athens
- Competitors: 10 in 5 sports
- Flag bearer: Michael Maskell
- Medals: Gold 0 Silver 0 Bronze 0 Total 0

Summer Olympics appearances (overview)
- 1968; 1972; 1976; 1980; 1984; 1988; 1992; 1996; 2000; 2004; 2008; 2012; 2016; 2020; 2024

Other related appearances
- British West Indies (1960 S)

Barbados competed at the 2004 Summer Olympics in Athens, Greece, from 13 to 29 August 2004. This nation marked its ninth appearance at the Olympics, except the 1980 Summer Olympics in Moscow because of the United States boycott.

The Barbados Olympic Association sent the nation's smallest team to the Games since the 1976 Summer Olympics in Montreal. A total of ten athletes, nine men and one woman, competed only in five different sports. Half of them had previously competed in Sydney, including track star and Olympic bronze medalist Obadele Thompson, and four-time Olympic skeet shooter Michael Maskell, who later became the nation's flag bearer in the opening ceremony.

Barbados left Athens without a single Olympic medal, although Thompson managed to achieve a seventh-place finish in the 100 metres as the nation's highest result.

== Athletics ==
Barbadian athletes have so far achieved qualifying standards in the following athletics events (up to a maximum of 3 athletes in each event at the 'A' Standard, and 1 at the 'B' Standard).

Men

| Athlete | Event | Heat | | Quarterfinal | | Semifinal | | Final | |
| Athlete | Event | Result | Rank | Result | Rank | Result | Rank | Result | Rank |
|---|---|---|---|---|---|---|---|---|---|
| Stephen Jones | 110 m hurdles | 13.56 NR | 4 Q | 13.85 | 6 | Did not advance | | | |
| Obadele Thompson | 100 m | 10.08 | 2 Q | 10.12 | 2 Q | 10.22 | 4 Q | 10.10 | 7 |

Women

| Athlete | Event | Heat | | Semifinal | | Final | |
| Athlete | Event | Result | Rank | Result | Rank | Result | Rank |
|---|---|---|---|---|---|---|---|
| Andrea Blackett | 400 m hurdles | 56.49 | 6 | Did not advance | | | |

Key

- Note–Ranks given for track events are within the athlete's heat only
- Q = Qualified for the next round
- q = Qualified for the next round as a fastest loser or, in field events, by position without achieving the qualifying target
- NR = National record
- N/A = Round not applicable for the event
- Bye = Athlete not required to compete in round

== Cycling ==
=== Track ===
Sprint

| Athlete | Event | Qualification | | Round 1 | Repechage 1 | Round 2 | Repechage 2 | Quarterfinals | Semifinals | Final | |
| Athlete | Event | Time Speed (km/h) | Rank | Opposition Time Speed (km/h) | Opposition Time Speed (km/h) | Opposition Time Speed (km/h) | Opposition Time Speed (km/h) | Opposition Time Speed (km/h) | Opposition Time Speed (km/h) | Opposition Time Speed (km/h) | Rank |
|---|---|---|---|---|---|---|---|---|---|---|---|
| Barry Forde | Men's sprint | 10.597; 67.943 | 13 | Edgar (GBR); L | Kwiatkowski (POL); Nimke (GER); W 10.731; 67.095 | Wolff (GER); L | Mulder (NED); Villanueva (ESP); W 11.294; 63.750 | Bayley (AUS); L, L | Did not advance | 5th place final Edgar (GBR); Zieliński (POL); Bourgain (FRA); L | 6 |

== Judo ==
Barbados has qualified a single judoka.

| Athlete | Event | Round of 32 | Round of 16 | Quarterfinals | Semifinals | Repechage 1 | Repechage 2 | Repechage 3 | Final / BM | |
| Athlete | Event | Opposition Result | Opposition Result | Opposition Result | Opposition Result | Opposition Result | Opposition Result | Opposition Result | Opposition Result | Rank |
|---|---|---|---|---|---|---|---|---|---|---|
| Barry Kirk Jackman | Men's −100 kg | Kelly (AUS); L 0010–1101 | Did not advance | | | | | | | |

== Shooting ==
Men

| Athlete | Event | Qualification | | Final | |
| Athlete | Event | Points | Rank | Points | Rank |
|---|---|---|---|---|---|
| Michael Maskell | Skeet | 117 | =31 | Did not advance | |

== Swimming ==
Barbadian swimmers earned qualifying standards in the following events (up to a maximum of 2 swimmers in each event at the A-standard time, and 1 at the B-standard time):

Men

| Athlete | Event | Heat | | Semifinal | | Final | |
| Athlete | Event | Result | Rank | Result | Rank | Result | Rank |
|---|---|---|---|---|---|---|---|
| Damian Alleyne | 100 m freestyle | 51.89 | 48 | Did not advance | | | |
| Damian Alleyne | 200 m freestyle | 1:52.89 | 34 | Did not advance | | | |
| Bradley Ally | 100 m breaststroke | 1:04.71 | 41 | Did not advance | | | |
| Bradley Ally | 200 m breaststroke | 2:18.64 | 35 | Did not advance | | | |
| Bradley Ally | 200 m individual medley | 2:03.29 | 23 | Did not advance | | | |
| Bradley Ally | 400 m individual medley | 4:24.70 | 25 | — | | Did not advance | |
| Terrence Haynes | 50 m freestyle | 23.90 | 56 | Did not advance | | | |
| Nicholas Neckles | 100 m backstroke | 56.32 | 25 | Did not advance | | | |
| Nicholas Neckles | 200 m backstroke | 2:02.84 | 23 | Did not advance | | | |

== See also ==
- Barbados at the 2003 Pan American Games
- Barbados at the 2004 Summer Paralympics
