= Barbados at the 1976 Summer Olympics =

- IOC code: BAR
- NOC: Barbados Olympic Association

in Montreal Canada
- Competitors: 11 (9 men and 2 women) in 2 sports
- Flag bearer: Lorna Forde
- Medals: Gold 0 Silver 0 Bronze 0 Total 0

Summer Olympics appearances (overview)
- 1968; 1972; 1976; 1980; 1984; 1988; 1992; 1996; 2000; 2004; 2008; 2012; 2016; 2020; 2024; 2028

Other related appearances
- British West Indies (1960 S)

Barbados competed at the 1976 Summer Olympics in Montreal, Quebec, Canada. Eleven competitors, nine men and two women, took part in eleven events in two sports.

== Athletics ==
Men's 800 metres

- Orlando Greene
  - Heat – 1:51.43 (→ did not advance)

Men's 4×100 metres Relay

- Rawle Clarke, Hamil Grimes, Pearson Jordan, and Pearson Trotman
  - Heat – 41.15s (→ did not advance)

Men's 4×400 metres Relay

- Victor Gooding, Harcourt Wason, Hamil Grimes, and Orlando Greene
  - Heat – 3:08.13 (→ did not advance)
- Lorna Forde
- Freida Nicholls-Davy

== Cycling ==
Two cyclists represented Antigua and Barbuda in 1976.

Sprint

- Stanley Smith – 18th place

1000m time trial

- Hector Edwards – 1:10.084 (→ 18th place)
