= Barbados at the 1992 Summer Olympics =

- IOC code: BAR
- NOC: Barbados Olympic Association

in Barcelona
- Competitors: 17 (16 men, 1 woman) in 5 sports
- Medals: Gold 0 Silver 0 Bronze 0 Total 0

Summer Olympics appearances (overview)
- 1968; 1972; 1976; 1980; 1984; 1988; 1992; 1996; 2000; 2004; 2008; 2012; 2016; 2020; 2024

Other related appearances
- British West Indies (1960 S)

Barbados competed at the 1992 Summer Olympics in Barcelona, Spain. Seventeen competitors, sixteen men and one woman, took part in seventeen events in five sports.

== Competitors ==
The following is the list of number of competitors in the Games.

Sport	Men	Women	Total
Athletics	7	1	8
Boxing	2	–	2
Cycling	1	0	1
Sailing	5	0	5
Shooting	1	0	1
Total	16	1	17

== Athletics ==
Men
Track and road events

Athlete	Event	Heats		Quarterfinal		Semifinal		Final	
Athlete	Event	Result	Rank	Result	Rank	Result	Rank	Result	Rank
Henrico Atkins	100 metres	10.83	49	Did not advance					
Henrico Atkins	200 metres	21.28	33 q	21.19	30	Did not advance			
Seibert Straughn	400 metres	46.54	36	Did not advance					
Stevon Roberts	800 metres	1:52.30	45	—		Did not advance			
Leo Garnes	5000 metres	15:21.95	51	—				Did not advance	
Seibert Straughn; Roger Jordan; Edsel Chase; Stevon Roberts	4 × 400 metres relay	DQ		—				Did not advance	

Field events

Athlete	Event	Qualification		Final	
Athlete	Event	Distance	Position	Distance	Position
Alvin Haynes	Triple jump	15.93	32	Did not advance	

Women
Track and road events

Athlete	Event	Heats		Quarterfinal		Semifinal		Final	
Athlete	Event	Result	Rank	Result	Rank	Result	Rank	Result	Rank
Prisca Philip	200 metres	24.56	39	Did not advance					
Prisca Philip	400 metres	55.09	34	Did not advance					

== Boxing ==
Athlete	Event	Round of 32	Round of 16	Quarterfinals	Semifinals	Final	
Athlete	Event	Opposition Result	Opposition Result	Opposition Result	Opposition Result	Opposition Result	Rank
Christopher Henry	Light welterweight	Seidu (GHA); W DQ	Bouneb (ALG); L 3–17	Did not advance			
Marcus Thomas	Light middleweight	Reid (GBR); L KO	Did not advance				

== Cycling ==
One male cyclist represented Barbados in 1992.

=== Track ===
Sprint

Athlete	Event	Qualification		Round 1	Repechage		Round 2	Repechage 2	Quarterfinals	Semifinals	Final	
Athlete	Event	Qualification		Round 1	Round 1	Round 2	Round 2	Repechage 2	Quarterfinals	Semifinals	Final	
Athlete	Event	Time Speed (km/h)	Rank	Opposition Time Speed (km/h)	Opposition Time Speed (km/h)	Opposition Time Speed (km/h)	Opposition Time Speed (km/h)	Opposition Time Speed (km/h)	Opposition Time Speed (km/h)	Opposition Time Speed (km/h)	Opposition Time Speed (km/h)	Rank
Livingstone Alleyne	Men's sprint	11.559	19	Lovito (ARG), Chiappa (ITA); L	Kovsh (EUN); L	Did not advance						

Time trial

Athlete	Event	Time	Rank
Livingstone Alleyne	Time trial	1:09.014	24

== Sailing ==
Men

Athlete	Event	Race										Net points	Final rank
Athlete	Event	1	2	3	4	5	6	7	8	9	10	Net points	Final rank
Brian Talma	Lechner A-390	45	42	42	38	~~51~~	42	43	46	51	45	394	40
Andrew Burke	Finn	30	~~32~~	27	31	32	26	31	—			177	26

Match racing

Athlete	Event	Qualification races						Total	Rank
Athlete	Event	1	2	3	4	5	6	Total	Rank
David Staples; Jason Teller; Richard Hoad	Soling	~~28~~	28	24	28	27	22	129	22

== Shooting ==
Open

Athlete	Event	Qualification		Final	
Athlete	Event	Points	Rank	Points	Rank
Michael Maskell	Skeet	145	25	Did not advance	

== See also ==
- Barbados at the 1991 Pan American Games
