= Barbados at the 1972 Summer Olympics =

- IOC code: BAR
- NOC: Barbados Olympic Association

in Munich
- Competitors: 13 (8 men and 5 women) in 4 sports
- Flag bearer: Anthony Phillips (Weightlifting)
- Medals: Gold 0 Silver 0 Bronze 0 Total 0

Summer Olympics appearances (overview)
- 1968; 1972; 1976; 1980; 1984; 1988; 1992; 1996; 2000; 2004; 2008; 2012; 2016; 2020; 2024

Other related appearances
- British West Indies (1960 S)

Barbados competed at the 1972 Summer Olympics in Munich, West Germany. 13 competitors, 8 men and 5 women, took part in 13 events in 4 sports.

== Athletics ==
Men's Competition

- Caspar Springer
- Clifford Brooks

Women's Competition

- Marcia Trotman
- Barbara Bishop
- Lorna Forde
- Heather Gooding
- Freida Nicholls-Davy

== Cycling ==
Three men represented Barbados in 1972.

Individual road race

- Kensley Reece – did not finish (→ no ranking)
- Hector Edwards – did not finish (→ no ranking)
- Orlando Bates – did not finish (→ no ranking)

Sprint

- Hector Edwards
- Kensley Reece

1000m time trial

- Hector Edwards

Individual pursuit

- Orlando Bates

== Shooting ==
Two male shooters represented Barbados in 1972.

50 m rifle, prone

- Milton Tucker
- Cavour Morris

== Weightlifting ==
- Anthony Phillips
