= Barbados at the 2012 Summer Olympics =

- IOC code: BAR
- NOC: Barbados Olympic Association
- Website: www.olympic.org.bb

in London
- Competitors: 6 in 3 sports
- Flag bearers: Ryan Brathwaite (opening); Kyle Maxwell (closing)
- Medals: Gold 0 Silver 0 Bronze 0 Total 0

Summer Olympics appearances (overview)
- 1968; 1972; 1976; 1980; 1984; 1988; 1992; 1996; 2000; 2004; 2008; 2012; 2016; 2020; 2024; 2028

Other related appearances
- British West Indies (1960 S)

Barbados competed at the 2012 Summer Olympics in London, United Kingdom from 27 July to 12 August 2012. This nation marked its eleventh appearance at the Olympic games.

The Barbados Olympic Association sent the nation's smallest team to the Games. A total of six athletes, all men, participate only in athletics, judo, and swimming. The nation's female athletes, however, failed to compete for the first time in its history since its national debut at the 1968 Summer Olympics in Mexico City. The Barbadian team also included backstroke and medley swimmer Bradley Ally, who competed at his third Olympic games. Sprint hurdler Ryan Brathwaite was appointed by the committee to be the nation's flag bearer at the opening ceremony.

Barbados left London, however, without winning a single Olympic medal for the third consecutive time. Brathwaite, the nation's Olympic hopeful, nearly missed out of the medal standings, finishing abruptly in fifth place.

== Athletics ==
Athletes from Barbados have so far achieved qualifying standards in the following athletics events (up to a maximum of 3 athletes in each event at the 'A' Standard, and 1 at the 'B' Standard):

Key

- Note – Ranks given for track events are within the athlete's heat only
- Q = Qualified for the next round
- q = Qualified for the next round as a fastest loser or, in field events, by position without achieving the qualifying target
- NR = National record
- N/A = Round not applicable for the event
- Bye = Athlete not required to compete in round

Men

| Athlete | Event | Heat | | Quarterfinal | | Semifinal | | Final | |
| Athlete | Event | Result | Rank | Result | Rank | Result | Rank | Result | Rank |
|---|---|---|---|---|---|---|---|---|---|
| Ryan Brathwaite | 110 m hurdles | 13.23 | 2 Q | —N/a | | 13.23 | 2 Q | 13.40 | 5 |
| Shane Brathwaite | 110 m hurdles | DNF | | —N/a | | Did not advance | | | |
| Ramon Gittens | 100 m | Bye | | 10.35 | 6 | Did not advance | | | |
| Greggmar Swift | 110 m hurdles | 13.62 | 5 | —N/a | | Did not advance | | | |

== Judo ==
| Athlete | Event | Round of 64 | Round of 32 | Round of 16 | Quarterfinals | Semifinals | Repechage | Final / BM | |
| Athlete | Event | Opposition Result | Opposition Result | Opposition Result | Opposition Result | Opposition Result | Opposition Result | Opposition Result | Rank |
|---|---|---|---|---|---|---|---|---|---|
| Kyle Maxwell | Men's −73 kg | Bye | Nakaya (JPN); L 0001–0100 | Did not advance | | | | | |

== Swimming ==
Swimmers have so far achieved qualifying standards in the following events (up to a maximum of 2 swimmers in each event at the Olympic Qualifying Time (OQT), and potentially 1 at the Olympic Selection Time (OST)):

Men

| Athlete | Event | Heat | | Semifinal | | Final | |
| Athlete | Event | Time | Rank | Time | Rank | Time | Rank |
|---|---|---|---|---|---|---|---|
| Bradley Ally | 100 m backstroke | 56.27 | 40 | Did not advance | | | |
| Bradley Ally | 200 m individual medley | 2:00.85 | =22 | Did not advance | | | |
| Bradley Ally | 400 m individual medley | 4:21.32 | 25 | —N/a | | Did not advance | |

== See also ==
- Barbados at the 2011 Pan American Games
