= Barbados at the 2020 Summer Paralympics =

- Flag of Barbados
- IPC code: BAR
- NPC: National Paralympic Committee Barbados

in Tokyo, Japan August 24, 2021 – September 5, 2021
- Competitors: 1 (1 man and 0 women) in 1 sport
- Flag bearer: Antwahn Boyce-Vaughan
- Medals: Gold 0 Silver 0 Bronze 0 Total 0

Summer Paralympics appearances (overview)
- 2000; 2004; 2008; 2012; 2016; 2020; 2024

Barbados competed at the 2020 Summer Paralympics in Tokyo, Japan, from 24 August to 5 September 2021. This was their fifth overall appearance at the Summer Paralympics.

== Competitors ==
The following is the list of number of competitors participating in the Games:

Sport	Men	Women	Total
Swimming	1	0	1

== Swimming ==
DNA: Did not advance

Men

Athlete	Event	Heats		Final	
Athlete	Event	Result	Rank	Result	Rank
Antwahn Boyce-Vaughan	50m freestyle S9	37.86	2	DNA	24

== See also ==
- Barbados at the Paralympics
- Barbados at the 2020 Summer Olympics
