= Barbados at the 2012 Summer Paralympics =

- IPC code: BAR
- NPC: Paralympic Association of Barbados

in London
- Competitors: 1 in 1 sport
- Medals: Gold 0 Silver 0 Bronze 0 Total 0

Summer Paralympics appearances (overview)
- 2000; 2004; 2008; 2012; 2016; 2020; 2024

Barbados competed at the 2012 Summer Paralympics in London, United Kingdom from August 29 to September 9, 2012.

== Swimming ==
Men

| Athletes | Event | Heat | | Final | |
| Athletes | Event | Time | Rank | Time | Rank |
|---|---|---|---|---|---|
| David Taylor | 50m freestyle S9 | 46.38 | 16 | Did not advance | |
| David Taylor | 100m breaststroke SB8 | 2:30.17 | 21 | Did not advance | |

== See also ==
- Barbados at the Paralympics
- Barbados at the 2012 Summer Olympics
