= Barbados at the 2024 Summer Paralympics =

- Flag of Barbados
- IPC code: BAR
- NPC: Paralympic Association of Barbados

in Paris, France August 28, 2024 – September 8, 2024
- Competitors: 1 (1 man) in 1 sport
- Flag bearer: Antwahn Boyce-Vaughan
- Medals: Gold 0 Silver 0 Bronze 0 Total 0

Summer Paralympics appearances (overview)
- 2000; 2004; 2008; 2012; 2016; 2020; 2024

Barbados competed at the 2024 Summer Paralympics in Paris, France, from 28 August to 8 September 2024. This was the nation's sixth time competing at the Summer Paralympic Games after it made its debut at the 2000 Summer Paralympics. The delegation consisted of only one competitor from one sport.

== Competitors ==
The following is the list of number of competitors in the Games.

Sport	Men	Women	Total
Swimming	1	0	1
Total	1	0	1

== Swimming ==
Athlete	Event	Heats		Final	
Athlete	Event	Result	Rank	Result	Rank
Antwahn Boyce-Vaughan	Men's 50 metre freestyle S9	34.28	18	Did not advance	

== See also ==
- Barbados at the 2024 Summer Olympics
- Barbados at the Paralympics
