= Barbados at the 2008 Summer Paralympics =

- IPC code: BAR
- NPC: Paralympic Association of Barbados

in Beijing
- Competitors: 1 in 1 sport
- Medals: Gold 0 Silver 0 Bronze 0 Total 0

Summer Paralympics appearances (overview)
- 2000; 2004; 2008; 2012; 2016; 2020; 2024

Barbados took part in the 2008 Summer Paralympics in Beijing, People's Republic of China. The country's delegation consisted of a single competitor, swimmer David Taylor. Taylor participated in two events and did not win a medal.

== Swimming ==
Athlete	Event	Heat		Final	
Athlete	Event	Result	Rank	Result	Rank
David Taylor	Men's 50 m freestyle S9	47.73	23	Did not advance	
David Taylor	Men's 100 m breaststroke SB8	2:24.90	13	Did not advance	

== See also ==
- Barbados at the Paralympics
- Barbados at the 2008 Summer Olympics
