= Barbados at the 2024 Summer Olympics =

- Flag of Barbados
- IOC code: BAR
- NOC: Barbados Olympic Association
- Website: www.olympic.org.bb

in Paris, France 26 July 2024 – 11 August 2024
- Competitors: 4 (2 men and 2 women) in 3 sports
- Flag bearers (opening): Jack Kirby and Sada Williams
- Flag bearer (closing): Matthew Wright
- Medals: Gold 0 Silver 0 Bronze 0 Total 0

Summer Olympics appearances (overview)
- 1968; 1972; 1976; 1980; 1984; 1988; 1992; 1996; 2000; 2004; 2008; 2012; 2016; 2020; 2024

Other related appearances
- British West Indies (1960 S)

Barbados competed at the 2024 Summer Olympics in Paris from 26 July to 11 August 2024. It was the nation's fourteenth appearance at the Summer Olympics, having made its debut at the 1968 Summer Olympics in Mexico City. The Barbadian delegation consisted of four athletes competing across two sports. The country did not win any medals at the Games.

== Background ==
The Barbados Olympic Association was founded in 1965 and was recognized by the International Olympic Committee (IOC) in 1968. The nation made its first Olympic appearance at the 1968 Summer Olympics in Mexico City. Since then, it has competed in every Olympics except the 1980 Summer Olympics in Moscow. The 2024 Summer Olympics was the nation's fourteenth appearance at the Summer Olympics.

The 2024 Summer Olympics was held in Paris, France, between 26 July and 11 August 2024. Swimmer Jack Kirby and sprinter Sada Williams were the country's flag bearers at the opening ceremony. Triathlete Matthew Wright served as the flag bearer during the closing ceremony. Barbados did not win a medal at the Games.

== Competitors ==
The team from Barbados consisted of four athletes competing in three sports.

Sport	Men	Women	Total
Athletics	0	2	2
Swimming	1	0	1
Triathlon	1	0	1
Total	2	2	4

== Athletics ==
As per the governing body World Athletics (WA), a NOC was allowed to enter up to three qualified athletes in each individual event if the Olympic Qualifying Standards (OQS) had been met during the qualification period from 1 July 2023 to 30 June 2024. Two track and field athletes from Barbados achieved the entry standards for the 2024 Summer Olympics, Tristan Evelyn in the women's 100 m and Sada Williams in the women's 400 m.

Evelyn won gold in both the women's 60 metres and 200 metres at the American Athletic Conference Indoor Track and Field Championships in 2020. She set a national record in the 100 metres in May 2021 with a time of 11.14 seconds at the American Athletic Conference Championship, which secured her Olympic qualification for the 2024 Summer Olympics. This was her second consecutive Olympic participation after her debut in the 2020 Summer Olympics.

Sada Williams attended Kansas State University. She won a bronze medal in the 400 metres at the 2022 World Athletics Championships in Eugene, becoming the first Barbadian woman to win a medal at the World Athletics Championships. Later that year, she won the gold medal in the 400 metres at the 2022 Commonwealth Games in Birmingham, setting a new Games record of 49.90 seconds. This was her second consecutive Olympic participation after her debut in the 2020 Summer Olympics.

The athletics events were held at the Stade de France in Saint Denis. In the women's 100 m, Evelyn finished sixth in her heat with a time of 11.55 seconds and did not qualify for the semifinals. In the women's 400 m, Williams advanced through the opening rounds after finishing third in both the preliminary heat and the semifinal. In the final, she finished seventh with a time of 49.83 seconds.

Key

- Note–Ranks given for track events are within the athlete's heat only
- Q = Qualified for the next round
- q = Qualified for the next round as a fastest loser or, in field events, by position without achieving the qualifying target
- NR = National record
- N/A = Round not applicable for the event
- Bye = Athlete not required to compete in round

Athlete	Event	Preliminary		Heat		Repechage		Semifinal		Final	
Athlete	Event	Time	Rank	Time	Rank	Time	Rank	Time	Rank	Time	Rank
Tristan Evelyn	Women's 100 m	Bye		11.55	6	—N/a		Did not advance			
Sada Williams	Women's 400 m	—N/a		50.45	3 Q	Bye		49.89	3 q	49.83	7

== Swimming ==
As per the World Aquatics guidelines, a NOC was permitted to enter a maximum of two qualified athletes in each individual event, who have achieved the Olympic Qualifying Time. One athlete per event will be allowed to enter if they meet the Olympic Selection Time if the quota is not filled. NOCs were allowed to enter swimmers (one per gender) under a universality place even if no one achieved the standard entry times. Barbados sent a single swimmer to compete at the 2024 Paris Olympics.

The swimming events were held at the Paris La Défense Arena at Nanterre.

Jack Kirby competed in the men's 100 m freestyle . This was the debut Olympic appearance for him. He had earlier competed in the 2018 Summer Youth Olympics. In the qualifying heats, he finished 46th and did not advance further.

Athlete	Event	Heat		Semifinal		Final	
Athlete	Event	Time	Rank	Time	Rank	Time	Rank
Jack Kirby	Men's 100 m freestyle	50.42	46	Did not advance			

== Triathlon ==
Barbados entered one male triathlete in the triathlon events for Paris, following the release of final individual olympics qualification ranking, marking the country's return to the sport for the first time since 2016.

Matthew Wright attended Loughborough University in England. He won his first major international competition at the age of 30, securing a gold medal at the Asia Triathlon Cup in Aqaba, Jordan, in October 2022. He won a bronze medal at the 2023 Central American and Caribbean Games in San Salvador.

The triathlon events were held at the Pont d'Iéna in Paris. In the men's individual event, Wright finished 34th out of 55 competitors with an overall time of 1 hour, 49 minutes, and 18 seconds.

Athlete	Event	Time						Rank
Athlete	Event	Swim (1.5 km)	Trans 1	Bike (40 km)	Trans 2	Run (10 km)	Total	Rank
Matthew Wright	Men's	22:13	23:02	1:16:52	1:17:16	1:49:18	1:49:18	34

== See also ==
- Barbados at the 2023 Pan American Games
