= Nicholas Neckles =

Barbadian swimmer (born 1978)

Nick Neckles
Personal information
- Full name: Nicholas Alfred Neckles
- Nationality: Barbados
- Born: 24 November 1978 (age 47) Bridgetown, Barbados
- Height: 5 ft 7 in (1.70 m)

Sport
- Sport: Swimming
- Strokes: Backstroke
- College team: University of Stirling (Scotland)
Medal record
Central American & Caribbean Games
Gold medal – first place	2006 Cartagena	50 Backstroke
Gold medal – first place	2006 Cartagena	100 Backstroke
Gold medal – first place	2006 Cartagena	200 Backstroke
Silver medal – second place	2010 Mayagüez	100 Backstroke

Nicholas ("Nick") Alfred Neckles (born 24 November 1978 in Bridgetown, Barbados) is a 3-time Olympic swimmer from Barbados. He swam for Barbados at the 1996, 2000, and 2004 Olympics. Heckles also competed at the 1999, 2003 and 2007 Pan American Games

As of April 2009, he holds the Barbadian Record in the 50, 100 and 200 backstroke.

He also competed/attended college at Scotland's University of Stirling.

At the 2006 Central American and Caribbean Games, he set the Games Records in the 200 backstroke (2:00.85), bettering the 2:01.53 swum by Cuba's Neisser Bent at the 1998 Games in Maracaibo, Venezuela. Neckles time also set the Barbadian Record.
