= Barbados at the 2004 Summer Paralympics =

- IPC code: BAR
- NPC: Paralympic Association of Barbados

in Athens
- Competitors: 1 in 1 sport
- Flag bearer: Daniel Coulthrust
- Medals: Gold 0 Silver 0 Bronze 0 Total 0

Summer Paralympics appearances (overview)
- 2000; 2004; 2008; 2012; 2016; 2020; 2024

Barbados competed at the 2004 Summer Paralympics in Athens, Greece. The team included one athlete, but won no medals.

== Sports ==
=== Cycling ===
==== Men's road ====
Athlete	Event	Points	Rank
Daniel Coulthrust	Men's road race/time trial LC3	24	12

== See also ==
- Barbados at the Paralympics
- Barbados at the 2004 Summer Olympics
