= Cycling at the 2004 Summer Olympics – Men's sprint =

Cycling at the Olympics

Men's sprint at the Games of the XXVIII Olympiad
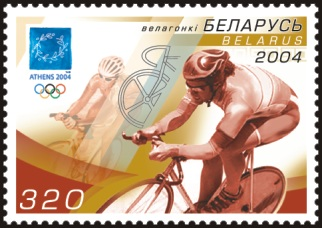
- Belarusian stamp commemorating 2004 Olympic cycling
- Venue: Athens Olympic Velodrome
- Dates: 22–24 August
- Competitors: 19 from 13 nations

Medalists
1st place, gold medalist(s)		Ryan Bayley; Australia
2nd place, silver medalist(s)		Theo Bos; Netherlands
3rd place, bronze medalist(s)		René Wolff; Germany

The men's sprint at the 2004 Summer Olympics (Cycling) was an event that consisted of cyclists making three laps around the track. Only the time for the last 200 metres of the 750 metres covered was counted as official time. There were 19 competitors from 13 nations, with each nation limited to two cyclists. The event was won by Ryan Bayley of Australia, the nation's first victory in the men's sprint after three times coming in second (most recently in 1992). Theo Bos of the Netherlands took silver, the Dutch team's first medal in the event since 1936. René Wolff earned bronze, stretching Germany's podium streak to four Games (five if East Germany is included; cyclists from eastern Germany had been on the podium in the event every Games since 1976 except the boycotted 1984 Games).

Australian Ryan Bayley defeated current world champion, Theo Bos from the Netherlands, when the sprinting gold medal was taken to a third decider race. In the race for the bronze René Wolff from Germany defeated Laurent Gané from France.

== Background ==
This was the 23rd appearance of the event, which has been held at every Summer Olympics except 1904 and 1912. Three of the quarterfinalists from 2000 returned: fourth-place finisher Laurent Gané of France, sixth-place finisher José Antonio Villanueva of Spain, and seventh-place finisher Sean Eadie of Australia. Three recent world champions were competing: Gané (2003, also runner-up in 2000, 2001, and 2004), Eadie (2002), and Theo Bos of the Netherlands (2004). René Wolff of Germany and Ryan Bayley of Australia were also significant contenders, each having reached the podium at world championships.

For the second consecutive Games, no nations made their debut in the men's sprint. France made its 23rd appearance, the only nation to have competed at every appearance of the event.

== Competition format ==
This sprint competition involved a series of head-to-head matches along with the new qualifying round of time trials. There were five main match rounds, with two one-round repechages.

- Qualifying round: Each of the 19 competitors completed a 200-metre flying time trial (reaching full speed before timing started for the last 200 metres). The top 18 advanced to the match rounds, seeded based on their time in the qualifying round. With only 19 riders starting, only the slowest cyclist was eliminated; however, one of the qualified riders withdrew, and the 19th-placed rider moved up to 18th and qualified.
- Round 1: The 18 cyclists were seeded into 9 heats of 2 cyclists each. The winner of each heat advanced to the 1/8 finals (9 cyclists) while the other cyclists went to the first repechage (9 cyclists).
- First repechage: The 9 cyclists were divided into 3 heats, each with 3 cyclists. The winner of each heat advanced to the 1/8 finals (3 cyclists) while the losers were eliminated (6 cyclists).
- 1/8 finals: The 12 remaining cyclists competed in a 1/8 finals round. There were 6 heats in this round, with 2 cyclists in each. The winner in each heat advanced to the quarterfinals (6 cyclists), while the loser in each heat went to the second repechage (6 cyclists).
- Second repechage: This round featured 2 heats, with 3 cyclists each. The winner of each heat advanced to the quarterfinals (2 cyclists); the losers competed in a ninth-twelfth classification race.
- Quarterfinals: Beginning with the quarterfinals, all matches were one-on-one competitions and were held in best-of-three format. There were 4 quarterfinals, with the winner of each advancing to the semifinals and the loser going to the fifth-eighth classification race.
- Semifinals: The two semifinals provided for advancement to the gold medal final for winners and to the bronze medal final for losers.
- Finals: Both a gold medal final and a bronze medal final were held, as well as a classification final for fifth through eighth places for quarterfinal losers.

== Records ==
The records for the sprint are 200 metre flying time trial records, kept for the qualifying round in later Games as well as for the finish of races.

World record	Curt Harnett (CAN)	9.865	Bogotá, Colombia	28 September 1995
Olympic record	Gary Neiwand (AUS)	10.129	Atlanta, United States	24 July 1996

No new world or Olympic records were set during the competition.

== Schedule ==
All times are Greece Standard Time (UTC+2)

Date	Time	Round
Sunday, 22 August 2004	9:15; 16:50; 17:30; 18:00; 18:50	Qualifying round Round 1 First repechage 1/8 finals Second repechage
Monday, 23 August 2004	17:05	Quarterfinals
Tuesday, 24 August 2004	16:40; 17:15; 18:30 18:40	Semifinals; Classification 9–12; Final; Bronze medal match Classification 5–8

== Results ==
=== Qualifying round ===
Times and average speeds are listed. Q denotes qualification for the next round.

After Tomohiro Nagatsuka dropped out of competition following the round, all of the cyclists following him advanced one position. This allowed Stefan Nimke to compete in the first round despite having originally placed 19th.

Rank	Cyclist	Nation	Time 200 m	Speed km/h	Notes
1	Ryan Bayley	Australia	10.177	70.747	Q
2	Theo Bos	Netherlands	10.214	70.491	Q
3	René Wolff	Germany	10.230	70.381	Q
4	Mickaël Bourgain	France	10.264	70.148	Q
5	Laurent Gané	France	10.271	70.100	Q
6	Ross Edgar	Great Britain	10.381	69.357	Q
7	Damian Zieliński	Poland	10.441	68.958	Q
8	José Antonio Villanueva	Spain	10.446	68.925	Q
9	Sean Eadie	Australia	10.454	68.873	Q
10	Łukasz Kwiatkowski	Poland	10.462	68.820	Q
11	Josiah Ng	Malaysia	10.515	68.473	Q
12	Teun Mulder	Netherlands	10.565	68.149	Q
13	Barry Forde	Barbados	10.597	67.943	Q
14	Tomohiro Nagatsuka	Japan	10.646	67.631	Q, withdrew
15	Kim Chi-beom	South Korea	10.673	67.459	Q
16	Jaroslav Jeřábek	Slovakia	10.758	66.926	Q
17	Yang Hui-cheon	South Korea	10.955	65.723	Q
18	Alois Kaňkovský	Czech Republic	10.956	65.717	Q
19	Stefan Nimke	Germany	11.338	63.503	q

=== Round 1 ===
The first round consisted of nine heats of two riders each. Winners advanced to the next round, losers competed in the 1/16 repechage.

==== Heat 1 ====
Rank	Cyclist	Nation	Time 200 m	Notes
1	Ryan Bayley	Australia	10.510	Q
2	Stefan Nimke	Germany		R

==== Heat 2 ====
Rank	Cyclist	Nation	Time 200 m	Notes
1	Theo Bos	Netherlands	10.799	Q
2	Alois Kaňkovský	Czech Republic		R

==== Heat 3 ====
Rank	Cyclist	Nation	Time 200 m	Notes
1	René Wolff	Germany	11.104	Q
2	Yang Hee-Chun	South Korea		R

==== Heat 4 ====
Rank	Cyclist	Nation	Time 200 m	Notes
1	Mickaël Bourgain	France	10.988	Q
2	Jaroslav Jeřábek	Slovakia		R

==== Heat 5 ====
Rank	Cyclist	Nation	Time 200 m	Notes
1	Laurent Gané	France	11.166	Q
2	Kim Chi-Bum	South Korea		R

==== Heat 6 ====
Rank	Cyclist	Nation	Time 200 m	Notes
1	Ross Edgar	Great Britain	10.768	Q
2	Barry Forde	Barbados		R

==== Heat 7 ====
Rank	Cyclist	Nation	Time 200 m	Notes
1	Damian Zieliński	Poland	10.833	Q
2	Teun Mulder	Netherlands		R

==== Heat 8 ====
Rank	Cyclist	Nation	Time 200 m	Notes
1	Jose Villanueva	Spain	11.234	Q
2	Josiah Ng	Malaysia		R

==== Heat 9 ====
Rank	Cyclist	Nation	Time 200 m	Notes
1	Sean Eadie	Australia	11.025	Q
2	Łukasz Kwiatkowski	Poland		R

=== First repechage ===
The nine defeated cyclists from the 1/16 round took part in the 1/16 repechage. They raced in three heats of three riders each. The winner of each heat rejoined the nine victors of the 1/16 round in advancing to the 1/8 round

==== First repechage heat 1 ====
Rank	Cyclist	Nation	Time 200 m	Speed km/h	Notes
1	Barry Forde	Barbados	10.731	67.095	Q
2	Łukasz Kwiatkowski	Poland			
3	Stefan Nimke	Germany			

==== First repechage heat 2 ====
Rank	Cyclist	Nation	Time 200 m	Speed km/h	Notes
1	Teun Mulder	Netherlands	10.740	67.039	Q
2	Kim Chi-Bum	South Korea			
3	Alois Kaňkovský	Czech Republic			

==== First repechage heat 3 ====
Rank	Cyclist	Nation	Time 200 m	Speed km/h	Notes
1	Josiah Ng	Malaysia	11.006	65.418	Q
2	Yang Hee-Chun	South Korea			
3	Jaroslav Jeřábek	Slovakia			

=== 1/8 finals ===
The 1/8 round consisted of six matches, each pitting two of the twelve remaining cyclists against each other. The winners advanced to the quarterfinals, with the losers getting another chance in the 1/8 repechage.

==== 1/8 final 1 ====
Rank	Cyclist	Nation	Time 200 m	Notes
1	Ryan Bayley	Australia	10.520	Q
2	Josiah Ng	Malaysia		R

==== 1/8 final 2 ====
Rank	Cyclist	Nation	Time 200 m	Notes
1	Theo Bos	Netherlands	11.164	Q
2	Teun Mulder	Netherlands		R

==== 1/8 final 3 ====
Rank	Cyclist	Nation	Time 200 m	Notes
1	René Wolff	Germany	10.548	Q
2	Barry Forde	Barbados		R

==== 1/8 final 4 ====
Rank	Cyclist	Nation	Time 200 m	Notes
1	Mickaël Bourgain	France	10.936	Q
2	Sean Eadie	Australia		R

==== 1/8 final 5 ====
Rank	Cyclist	Nation	Time 200 m	Notes
1	Laurent Gané	France	10.772	Q
2	Jose Villanueva	Spain		R

==== 1/8 final 6 ====
Rank	Cyclist	Nation	Time 200 m	Notes
1	Damian Zieliński	Poland	10.848	Q
2	Ross Edgar	Great Britain		R

=== Second repechage ===
The six cyclists defeated in the 1/8 round competed in the 1/8 repechage. Two heats of three riders were held. Winners rejoined the victors from the 1/8 round and advanced to the quarterfinals. The four other riders competed in the 9th through 12th place classification.

==== Second repechage heat 1 ====
Rank	Cyclist	Nation	Time 200 m	Speed km/h	Notes
1	Ross Edgar	Great Britain	10.906	66.018	Q
2	Josiah Ng	Malaysia			C
3	Sean Eadie	Australia			C

==== Second repechage heat 2 ====
Rank	Cyclist	Nation	Time 200 m	Speed km/h	Notes
1	Barry Forde	Barbados	11.294	63.750	Q
2	Teun Mulder	Netherlands			C
3	Jose Villanueva	Spain	REL		C

=== Quarterfinals ===
The eight riders that had advanced to the quarterfinals competed pairwise in four matches. Each match consisted of two races, with a potential third race being used as a tie-breaker if each cyclist won one of the first two races. All four quarterfinals matches were decided without a third race. Winners advanced to the semifinals, losers competed in a 5th to 8th place classification.

==== Quarterfinal 1 ====
Rank	Cyclist	Nation	Race 1	Race 2	Race 3	Notes
1	Ryan Bayley	Australia	10.733	10.807	—	Q
2	Barry Forde	Barbados			—	C

==== Quarterfinal 2 ====
Rank	Cyclist	Nation	Race 1	Race 2	Race 3	Notes
1	Theo Bos	Netherlands	11.024	10.905	—	Q
2	Ross Edgar	Great Britain			—	C

==== Quarterfinal 3 ====
Rank	Cyclist	Nation	Race 1	Race 2	Race 3	Notes
1	René Wolff	Germany	10.556	10.749	—	Q
2	Damian Zieliński	Poland			—	C

==== Quarterfinal 4 ====
Rank	Cyclist	Nation	Race 1	Race 2	Race 3	Notes
1	Laurent Gané	France	11.018	10.876	—	Q
2	Mickaël Bourgain	France			—	C

=== Semifinals ===
The four riders that had advanced to the semifinals competed pairwise in two matches. Each match consisted of two races, with a potential third race being used as a tie-breaker if each cyclist won one of the first two races. Both semifinals matches were decided without a third race. Winners advanced to the finals, losers competed in the bronze medal match.

==== Semifinal 1 ====
Rank	Cyclist	Nation	Race 1	Race 2	Race 3	Notes
1	Ryan Bayley	Australia	10.546	10.638	—	Q
2	Laurent Gané	France			—	B

==== Semifinal 2 ====
Rank	Cyclist	Nation	Race 1	Race 2	Race 3	Notes
1	Theo Bos	Netherlands	10.502	10.639	—	Q
2	René Wolff	Germany			—	B

=== Finals ===
==== Classification 9-12 ====
The 9-12 classification was a single race with all four riders that had lost in the 1/8 repechage taking place. The winner of the race received 9th place, with the others taking the three following places in order.

Rank	Cyclist	Nation	Time 200 m
9	Jose Villanueva	Spain	11.063
10	Teun Mulder	Netherlands	
11	Josiah Ng	Malaysia	
12	Sean Eadie	Australia	

==== Classification 5-8 ====
The 5-8 classification was a single race with all four riders that had lost in the quarterfinals taking place. The winner of the race received 5th place, with the others taking the three following places in order.

Rank	Cyclist	Nation	Time 200 m
5	Ross Edgar	Great Britain	11.214
6	Barry Forde	Barbados	
7	Damian Zieliński	Poland	
8	Mickaël Bourgain	France	

==== Bronze medal match ====
The bronze medal match was contested in a set of three races, with the winner of two races declared the winner. Since René Wolff won both of the first two races, the third was not run.

Rank	Cyclist	Nation	Race 1	Race 2	Race 3
3rd place, bronze medalist(s)	René Wolff	Germany	10.677	10.612	—
4	Laurent Gané	France			—

==== Final ====
The final was a best-of-three match. Bos took a lead in the series when he won the first race, but Bayley defeated him in the second race. The third race was decisive and Bayley came out on top again.

Rank	Cyclist	Nation	Race 1	Race 2	Race 3
1st place, gold medalist(s)	Ryan Bayley	Australia		10.661	10.743
2nd place, silver medalist(s)	Theo Bos	Netherlands	10.710		

== Final classification ==
Rank	Cyclist	Nation
1st place, gold medalist(s)	Ryan Bayley	Australia
2nd place, silver medalist(s)	Theo Bos	Netherlands
3rd place, bronze medalist(s)	René Wolff	Germany
4	Laurent Gané	France
5	Ross Edgar	Great Britain
6	Barry Forde	Barbados
7	Damian Zieliński	Poland
8	Mickaël Bourgain	France
9	José Antonio Villanueva	Spain
10	Teun Mulder	Netherlands
11	Josiah Ng	Malaysia
12	Sean Eadie	Australia
13	Łukasz Kwiatkowski	Poland
13	Kim Chi-Bum	South Korea
13	Yang Hee-Chun	South Korea
16	Stefan Nimke	Germany
16	Alois Kaňkovský	Czech Republic
16	Jaroslav Jeřábek	Slovakia
—	Tomohiro Nagatsuka	Japan
