= Barbados at the Paralympics =

- IPC code: BAR
- NPC: Paralympic Association of Barbados
- Competitors: 1 in 1 sports
- Medals: Gold 0 Silver 0 Bronze 0 Total 0

Summer appearances
- 2000; 2004; 2008; 2012; 2016; 2020; 2024

Barbados first competed at the Paralympic Games in 2000. It has participated in five Summer Paralympics since then. The country has never taken part in the Winter Paralympics and has never won a Paralympic medal. Only two people have represented Barbados at the games: Daniel Coulthurst, who competed in cycling in 2000 and 2004, and David Taylor, who competed in swimming in 2008.
