= Shane de Freitas =

Barbadian gymnast (born 1977)

- Full name: Francis Shane de Freitas
- Born: 12 September 1977 (age 48) Bridgetown, Barbados
- Height: 160 cm (5 ft 3 in)

Gymnastics career
- Discipline: Men's artistic gymnastics
- Country represented: Barbados
- College team: Iowa Hawkeyes

Francis Shane de Freitas (born 12 September 1977) is a Barbadian gymnast. He competed at the 1996 Summer Olympics. He competed collegiately for the Iowa Hawkeyes men's gymnastics team.
