= Harry Wozniak =

Barbadian swimmer (born 1964)

Personal information
- Full name: James Henry Wozniak
- Born: 27 June 1964 (age 62)

Sport
- Sport: Swimming

Harry Wozniak (born 27 June 1964) is a Barbadian swimmer. He competed in three events at the 1984 Summer Olympics.
