= Danielle Titus =

Barbadian swimmer (born 2002)

Personal information
- Full name: Danielle
- Born: 13 August 2002 (age 23) Barbados
- Height: 5 ft 11 in (180 cm)

Sport
- Sport: Swimming
- Strokes: Backstroke and IM
- Club: Alpha Sharks Swim Club
- College team: University of Houston

Danielle Titus (born 13 August 2002) is a Barbadian swimmer. She competed in the women's 100 metre backstroke at the 2020 Summer Olympics. She competes at the collegiate level for the University of Houston, having transferred there from Tulane University. She was raised by Neil and Andrea Titus, along with her sister Tiffany Titus.

Olympic Games
| Preceded by Ramon Gittens | Flag bearer for Barbados; Tokyo 2020 with Alex Sobers | Succeeded by Jack Kirby; Sada Williams |
