= Orlando Greene =

Barbadian sprinter

Personal information
- Nationality: Barbadian
- Born: 7 July 1953 (age 72)
- Height: 1.71 m (5 ft 7 1/2 in)
- Weight: 63 kg (139 lb)

Sport
- Sport: Track and field
- Event(s): 400; 800; 1600

Orlando Greene is an Olympic runner from Barbados who raced in the 1976 summer Olympic games in Montréal.

== History ==
Greene was born into poverty in Bridgetown, on the Caribbean island of Barbados, where at a very early age he made a name for himself as a cricket player. After winning in sprints, he soon found his true expertise in the longer distances of 400 and 800 metres. He attended Seton Hall University, setting school records in the 1600 metres and winning the 1973 4 × 400 meter relay at the NCAA Division I Indoor Track and Field Championships. In 1976 he set the Barbadian record for the 800 in Philadelphia. In that year he also competed in the 400 and 800 metres in Montréal. Greene retired from running in 1980 and began coaching track athletes throughout the Caribbean, including coaching the Barbados Olympic team in 1984. He played a significant role in the development of Olympians Andrea Blackett and Obadele Thompson.

In the 1980s, Greene emigrated to the United States. He currently lives in Lithia, Florida where he has served as the women’s track and cross-country coach at Joe E. Newsome High School. His teams frequently have far greater participation rates than other schools. He is given credit for helping athletes push themselves to their limits, even to the point of crawling to the finish line, as Lars Benner (University of Tampa) did in 2013.
