= Jim Wedderburn =

Barbadian sprinter

Olympic medal record

Men's Athletics

Representing British West Indies

Olympic Games
Bronze medal – third place	1960 Rome	4x400 metre relay

James Wedderburn (born 23 June 1938) is a Barbadian athlete who competed mainly in the 400 metres.

Wedderburn competed for the NYU Violets track and field team in the NCAA.

He competed for the British West Indies in the 1960 Summer Olympics held in Rome, Italy in the 4 x 400 metre relay where he won the bronze medal with his team mates from Jamaica Malcolm Spence, Keith Gardner and George Kerr.

== International competitions ==
Year	Competition	Venue	Position	Event	Notes
Representing the British West Indies
1960	Olympic Games	Rome, Italy	14th (qf)	400 m	47.0
1960	Olympic Games	Rome, Italy	3rd	4 × 400 m relay	3:04.13
Representing Barbados
1962	Central American and Caribbean Games	Kingston, Jamaica	13th (h)	400 m	49.2

== Personal bests ==
- 400 metres – 46.5h y (1961)
