= Hamil Grimes =

Barbadian sprinter (born 1956)

Personal information
- Nationality: Barbadian
- Born: 15 October 1956 (age 69)

Sport
- Sport: Sprinting
- Event: 400 metres

Hamil Grimes (born 15 October 1956) is a Barbadian sprinter. He competed in the men's 400 metres at the 1976 Summer Olympics.

Grimes competed for the Kentucky Wildcats track and field and the Kentucky State Thorobreds track and field teams in the NCAA.
