= Hadley Hinds =

Barbadian sprinter

Personal information
- Nationality: Barbadian
- Born: 16 September 1946
- Died: 6 May 2023 (aged 76)

Sport
- Sport: Sprinting
- Event: 200 metres

Hadley Hinds (16 September 1946 – 6 May 2023) was a Barbadian sprinter. He competed in the men's 200 metres at the 1968 Summer Olympics. He died on 6 May 2023.
