= Milton Tucker =

Barbadian sports shooter (1921–1986)

Personal information
- Born: 17 May 1921 Barbados
- Died: 1986 (aged 64–65)

Sport
- Sport: Sports shooting

Milton Tucker (17 May 1921 – 1986) was a Barbadian sports shooter. He competed at the 1968 Summer Olympics and the 1972 Summer Olympics.
