= Andrew Payne (judoka) =

Barbadian judoka

Personal information
- Nationality: Barbadian
- Born: 15 August 1977 (age 47)

Sport
- Sport: Judo

Andrew Payne (born 15 August 1977) is a Barbadian judoka. He competed at the 1996 Summer Olympics and the 2000 Summer Olympics.
