= O'Neal Marshall =

Barbadian windsurfer

Personal information
- Full name: O'Neal Ricardo Marshall
- Nationality: Barbadian
- Born: 25 August 1971 (age 55)

Sport
- Sport: Windsurfing

O'Neal Ricardo Marshall (born 25 August 1971) is a Barbadian windsurfer. He competed at the 1996 Summer Olympics and the 2000 Summer Olympics.
