= Sada Williams =

Barbadian sprinter (born 1997)

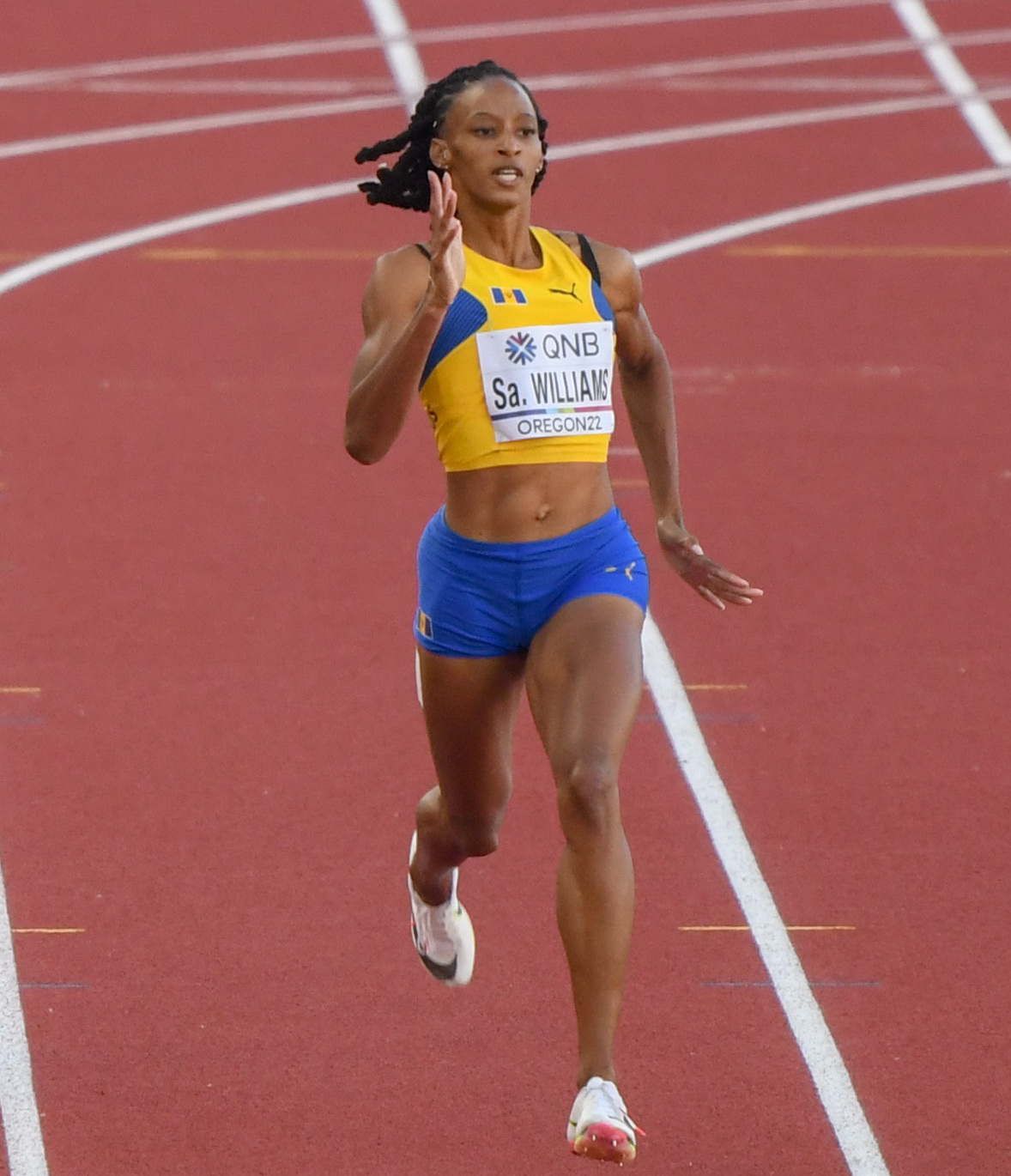
- Williams at the 2022 World Championships in Eugene

Personal information
- Born: 1 December 1997 (age 28) Saint Philip, Barbados
- Height: 1.78 m (5 ft 10 in)
- Weight: 53 kg (117 lb)

Sport
- Country: Barbados
- Sport: Athletics
- Events: 200 metres, 400 metres
- Club: MVP Track Club (2018–)
- Coached by: Stephen Francis (2018–)

Achievements and titles
- Personal bests: 100 m: 11.66 (2017); 200 m: 22.61 NR (2016); 400 m: 49.58 NR (2023)
Medal record
Women's athletics
Representing Barbados
World Championships
Bronze medal – third place	2022 Eugene	400 m
Bronze medal – third place	2023 Budapest	400 m
Commonwealth Games
Gold medal – first place	2022 Birmingham	400 m
Silver medal – second place	2026 Glasgow	400 m
NACAC Championships
Silver medal – second place	2022 Freeport	400 m

Sada Williams (SHAH-day; born 1 December 1997) is a Barbadian sprinter competing primarily in the 200 and 400 metres. She won the bronze medal in the 400 m at the 2022 World Championships, becoming the first Barbadian woman ever to win a medal at the World Athletics Championships. Williams took gold in the event at the 2022 Commonwealth Games.

She represented her country at the 2017 World Athletics Championships but did not reach the semifinals.

Williams competed at the 2020 Tokyo Olympics.

She had a breakthrough 2022 season, finishing third in the 400 m at the World Championships Eugene 2022 in July. She improved her own national record to 49.75 seconds, coming home only behind Shaunae Miller-Uibo (49.11 s) and Marileidy Paulino, who ran a time of 49.60 s. About two weeks later at the 2022 Commonwealth Games in Birmingham, Williams won the title in a Games record time of 49.90 seconds. She continued her fine season in August by claiming silver behind only Miller-Uibo (49.40 s) at the NACAC Championships in Freeport, Bahamas, with a time of 49.86 seconds.

== International competitions ==
Representing Barbados
Year	Competition	Venue	Position	Event	Notes
2014	CARIFTA Games (U18)	Fort-de-France, Martinique	2nd	200 m	23.43
2014	CARIFTA Games (U18)	Fort-de-France, Martinique	1st	400 m	53.39
2014	CARIFTA Games (U18)	Fort-de-France, Martinique	3rd	4 × 400 m relay	3:41.90
2014	World Junior Championships	Eugene, United States	23rd (sf)	200 m	24.37
2014	Youth Olympic Games	Nanjing, China	8th	400 m	54.93
2015	Pan American Games	Toronto, Canada	7th (h)	4 × 400 m relay	3:31.72^{1}
2015	Pan American Junior Championships	Edmonton, Canada	3rd	200 m	23.49
2015	Pan American Junior Championships	Edmonton, Canada	2nd	400 m	52.75
2016	CARIFTA Games (U20)	St. George's, Grenada	1st	200 m	22.72 (w)
2016	CARIFTA Games (U20)	St. George's, Grenada	1st	400 m	52.07
2016	World U20 Championships	Bydgoszcz, Poland	2nd (sf)	200 m	23.35^{2}
2017	World Championships	London, United Kingdom	30th (h)	200 m	23.55
2019	Pan American Games	Lima, Peru	6th	400 m	52.25
2019	World Championships	Doha, Qatar	10th (sf)	400 m	51.31
2021	Olympic Games	Tokyo, Japan	9th (sf)	400 m	50.11
2022	World Indoor Championships	Belgrade, Serbia	13th (h)	400 m	52.65
2022	World Championships	Eugene, OR, United States	3rd	400 m	49.75 NR
2022	Commonwealth Games	Birmingham, England	1st	400 m	49.90 GR
2022	NACAC Championships	Freeport, Bahamas	2nd	400 m	49.86
2023	World Championships	Budapest, Hungary	3rd	400 m	49.60
2024	Olympic Games	Paris, France	7th	400 m	49.83
2025	World Championships	Tokyo, Japan	13th (sf)	400 m	50.39
2026	Commonwealth Games	Glasgow, United Kingdom	2nd	400 m	50.99

^{1}Disqualified in the final
^{2}Did not finish in the final

== Personal bests ==
- 100 metres – 11.66 (0.0 m/s, St. Michael 2017)
- 200 metres – 22.59 (+1.5 m/s, Spanish Town 2024) NR
- 400 metres – 49.58 (Budapest 2023) NR

Olympic Games
Preceded by Alex Sobers; Danielle Titus	Flag bearer for Barbados; Paris 2024 with Jack Kirby	Succeeded by Incumbent
