= Alex Sobers =

Barbadian swimmer (born 1998)

Personal information
- Full name: Alex Xavier Sobers
- Born: November 13, 1998 (age 27) Bridgetown, Barbados

Sport
- Sport: Swimming
- College team: Emmanuel College Lions

Alex Xavier Sobers (born November 13, 1998) is a Barbadian swimmer.

He competed at the 2015 World Aquatics Championships and at the 2016 Summer Olympics in Rio de Janeiro, where he ranked #44 in the 400 m freestyle competition with a time of 3:59.97. He did not advance to the final.

He competed at the 2020 Summer Olympics.

He competed at the collegiate level for Emmanuel College. In 2020, Sobers joined the Boston College Eagles staff as a volunteer assistant coach.

Olympic Games
Preceded by Ramon Gittens	Flag bearer for Barbados; Tokyo 2020 with Danielle Titus	Succeeded by Jack Kirby; Sada Williams
