= Bradley Ally =

Barbadian swimmer (born 1986)

Bradley Ally OLY
Personal information
- Full name: Bradley Kevin Ally
- National team: Barbados
- Born: 11 December 1986 (age 39) Barbados
- Height: 1.83 m (6 ft 0 in)
- Weight: 77 kg (170 lb)

Sport
- Sport: Swimming
- Strokes: Backstroke, breaststroke, butterfly, freestyle, individual medley
- College team: University of Florida
Medal record
Men's swimming
Representing Barbados
Central American and Caribbean Games
Gold medal – first place	2006 Cartagena	200 m breast
Gold medal – first place	2006 Cartagena	200 m medley
Gold medal – first place	2006 Cartagena	400 m medley
Silver medal – second place	2006 Cartagena	100 m breast
Gold medal – first place	2010 Mayagüez	200 m medley
Gold medal – first place	2010 Mayagüez	400 m medley
Pan American Games
Bronze medal – third place	2007 Rio de Janeiro	200 m medley

Bradley Kevin Ally (born 11 December 1986) is a three-time Olympic swimmer from Barbados. He represented Barbados at the 2004, 2008 and 2012 Summer Olympics. He was the bronze medalist in the 200-meter individual medley at the Pan-American Games in Brazil 2007. He holds the Barbadian Record in the butterfly and individual medley events, as well as the 200-meter freestyle.

Ally was born in Barbados in 1986.

Ally received an athletic scholarship to attend the University of Florida in Gainesville, Florida, where he swam for coach Gregg Troy's Florida Gators swimming and diving team in National Collegiate Athletic Association (NCAA) competition from 2007 to 2010. Ally set an NCAA record in the 200-yard individual medley with a time of 1.40.49. He graduated from the University of Florida with a bachelor's degree in geology in 2010.

At the 2006 Central American and Caribbean Games, he bettered the Games records in the 200 and 400-metre individual medley (2:02.98 and 4:22.86).

Ally now coaches swimming near his home outside of Fort Lauderdale.

== See also ==
- Florida Gators
- List of University of Florida alumni
- List of University of Florida Olympians
