= Obadele Thompson =

Barbados-born former sprinter, lawyer, and author

Obadele Thompson BSS
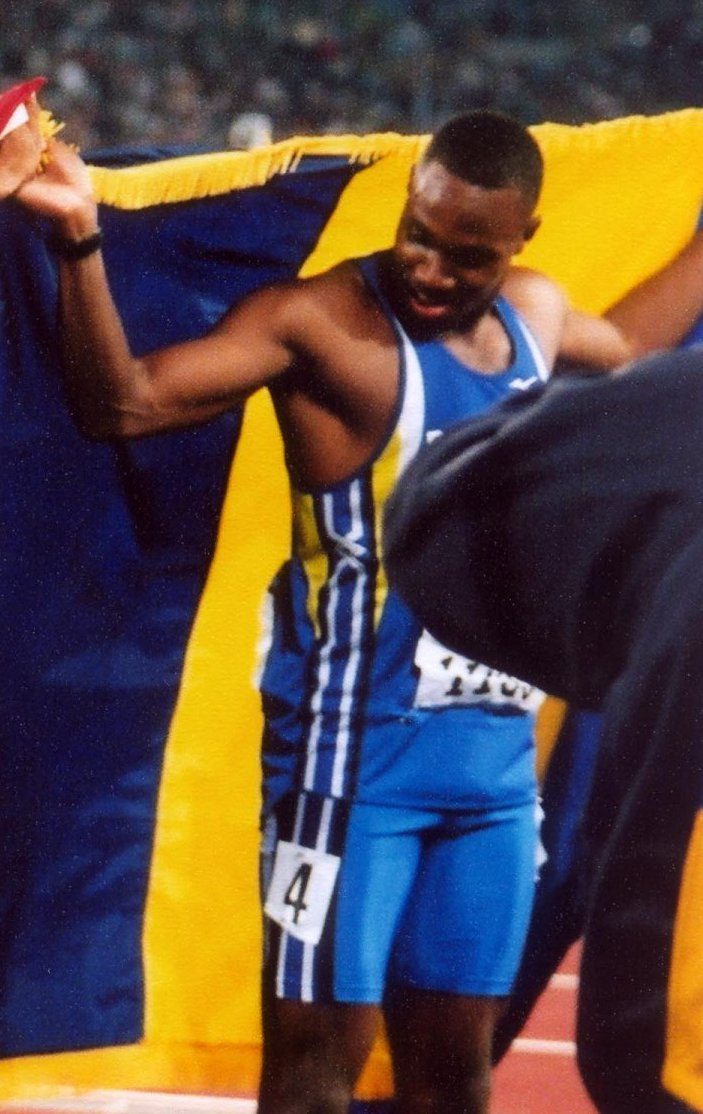
- Thompson in 2000

Personal information
- Nationality: Barbadian
- Born: Obadele Olutoson Thompson; 30 March 1976 (age 50) Saint Michael, Barbados
- Height: 5 ft 9 in (175 cm)

Sport
- Sport: Athletics
- Events: 100 metres, 200 metres
Medal record
Men's Athletics
Representing Barbados
Olympic Games
| Bronze medal – third place | 2000 Sydney | 100 m |
Commonwealth Games
| Bronze medal – third place | 1998 Kuala Lumpur | 100 m |
World Indoor Championships
| Silver medal – second place | 1999 Maebashi | 200 m |
IAAF World Cup in Athletics
| Gold medal – first place | 1998 Johannesburg | 100 m |
World University Games
| Silver medal – second place | 1995 Fukuoka | 100 m |
Central American and Caribbean Games
| Gold medal – first place | 1998 Maracaibo | 100 m |
CAC Championships
| Gold medal – first place | 1993 Cali | 100 m |
| Gold medal – first place | 1995 Guatemala City | 100 m |
| Gold medal – first place | 1995 Guatemala City | 200 m |
| Gold medal – first place | 1999 Bridgetown | 100 m |
| Gold medal – first place | 1999 Bridgetown | 4×100 m relay |
| Gold medal – first place | 2001 Guatemala City | 4×100 m relay |
| Silver medal – second place | 1995 Guatemala City | 4×100 m relay |

Obadele "Oba" Thompson BSS (born 30 March 1976) is a Barbados-born former sprinter, lawyer, author, and speaker. He won Barbados's first and only Olympic medal as an independent country by placing third in the 100 metres at the 2000 Sydney Olympics. He is a three-time Olympian (1996, 2000, and 2004), and a finalist at each Olympics. His personal best performances are 9.87 seconds for the 100 m, 19.97 seconds for the 200 metres (both Barbadian records), and 45.38 seconds for the 400 metres. He has held the indoor 55 metres world record (5.99 sec.) since 1997.

Obadele's Olympic success followed a collegiate career at the University of Texas-El Paso (UTEP) where he amassed several prestigious awards for his academics, athletics, and leadership. As a collegian, he won four individual NCAA sprint titles: indoor 200 m (1996 and 1997) and the outdoor 100 and 200 metres (1997). He set two NCAA records: indoor 55 m (1997) and indoor 200 m (1996). He established two world records: 55 m (1997) and the World Junior 100 m (1994). In 1996, he ran the then-fastest 100 m recorded under all conditions (9.69 sec.).

He was an eleven-time NCAA All-American and a sixteen-time Western Athletic Conference (WAC) Champion. Thompson won several Athlete of the Year awards, including the UTEP Athlete of the Year (1996 and 1997), US Track & Field and Cross Country Coaches Association (USTFCCCA) NCAA Division I Male Indoor Athlete of the Year (1997), and the Stan Bates WAC Male Student-Athlete of the Year (1997). He has also been listed as one of UTEP's all-time top 10 male athletes.

Thompson was a three-time USTFCCCA Academic All-American (1995–1997). In 1996, he became a member of Beta Gamma Sigma (BGS) honor society, the highest recognition business students worldwide can receive from an Association to Advance Collegiate Schools of Business (AACSB) accredited business program. In 1997, he was named a College Sports Information Directors of America (CoSIDA) First-Team At-Large Academic All-American (formerly the GTE First-Team At-Large Academic All-American award) and received the State of Texas Certificate of Merit for his exemplary achievement in academics and athletics. In 1998, he became a UTEP Alumni Association Top Ten Senior awardee, and received the NCAA Today's Top VIII Award (now the NCAA Today's Top 10) for outstanding leadership, athletics and academics, along with two-time NFL Super Bowl Champion, Peyton Manning, who attended the University of Tennessee.

After retiring from a decade-long professional athletics career, Thompson published his first book, Secrets of a Student-Athlete: A Reality Check, which was endorsed by legendary Duke basketball coach Mike Krzyzewski. Thompson was a keynote speaker at the official launch of the 2007 ICC Cricket World Cup in Barbados and has participated in leadership development programs, including with the West Indies Cricket Team. He has also served variously as a speaker and panellist on matters related to sports management, performance, and anti-doping.

Thompson was inducted into the UTEP Track and Field Hall of Fame in 2007, and into the UTEP Athletics and Drake Relays Halls of Fame in 2011.

He graduated from UTEP summa cum laude in economics and marketing and received his Juris Doctor (J.D.) from the University of Texas School of Law. He practices international arbitration and litigation.

== Athletics career ==
=== Junior athletics ===
Obadele began his athletic career at about six years old in Barbados at the Charles F. Broomes Primary School before transferring to Wesley Hall Junior School. However, his talents blossomed at his secondary school, Harrison College, under the tutelage of his physical education teacher, Orlando Greene (Barbados 800 m national record holder). He was also coached by respected Barbadian coaches Frank "Blackie" Blackman and the late Anthony Lovell.

==== 1990–1993 ====
Thompson first represented Barbados at age 14, winning the 100 and 200 metres at the 1990 Caribbean Union of Teachers (CUT) Games in Georgetown, Guyana. He again showed promise by winning the 100 m in the under-17 age division at the 1991 CARIFTA Games in Port of Spain, Trinidad. The CARIFTA Games is an annual Caribbean junior track and field championship that has produced notable Caribbean sprinters including Usain Bolt, Merlene Ottey and Pauline Davis-Thompson. Over the next three years, Thompson dominated the 100 m at the regional junior level, winning four successive CARIFTA Games 100 m titles (twice in both the under-17 and under-20 divisions), and not losing to a Caribbean junior sprinter at this distance since he was 14 years old. In 1993, Thompson became the Barbados national senior 100 m champion, and placed third and second in the 100 and 200 metres, respectively, at the Pan American Junior Athletics Championships in Winnipeg, Manitoba, Canada. A few weeks later, at only 17 years old, he won his first 100 m title at the 1993 Senior Central American and Caribbean Championships (CAC) in Cali, Colombia, clocking a slightly wind-assisted 10.30 sec. (+2.1 m/s wind).

Despite attending one of the top academic high schools in the Caribbean and being among the best sprinters in his age group in the world, he was initially not recruited by any universities because Barbados was then only known for being a top tourist destination and producing outstanding cricketers, not sprinters. He was also not invited to the top American junior track meets for similar reasons. Not deterred, in early 1993, Thompson contacted Hall of Fame former UTEP head track coach, Bob Kitchens, who had trained Nigerian sprinter, Olapade Adeniken, to the 1992 NCAA Outdoor 100 and 200 metres titles.

In August 1993, Thompson left Barbados on an athletic scholarship to become part of UTEP's long legacy of outstanding track and field athletes, which includes: Bob Beamon (1968 Olympic long jump champion), Suleiman Nyambui (1980 Olympic 5000 m silver medalist), Bert Cameron (1983 World Champion in the 400 m), Blessing Okagbare (2008 Olympic long jump silver medalist), and Churandy Martina (European Champion in the 100 and 200 metres).

==== 1994 ====
Thompson made an immediate impact on the collegiate scene, while still only 17 years old, he reached the finals at the 1994 NCAA Indoor Championships in the 55 and 200 metres—the only male athlete to do so that year—while helping his team finish third overall. He opened his outdoor season before his home crowd at the CARTIFA Games in Barbados, defending his under-20 100 m title in a new meet record (10.33 sec.), and winning the 200 m for the first time (20.71 sec.). His record-setting 100 m run earned him the Austin Sealy Award for Most Outstanding Performance of the championships. Two weeks later at the Sierra Medical Center/UTEP Invitational in El Paso, Texas, Thompson established his first global mark by equaling the World Junior Record of 10.08 sec. in the 100 m (broken in 1998 by Dwain Chambers).

Unfortunately, shortly afterward he sustained his first major injury, a non-displaced fracture in his neck, which went improperly diagnosed for several months. Despite this season-altering injury, Thompson helped UTEP finish second overall at the NCAA Outdoor Championships, as part of the 4 × 100 m and 4 × 400 m relays. He also won the Jamaica Junior National Championships in the 100 m (as a visiting athlete), the CAC Junior Championships in the 100 and 200 metres, placed fourth in the 100 m at the World Junior Championships and was the youngest semifinalist in 100 m at the Commonwealth Games in Victoria, Canada.

==== 1995 ====
Obadele completed his final year in the junior (under-20) category by dominating the yearly global 100 m performance list. He twice recorded the fastest junior 100 m time (10.18 sec.) and ran 8 of the 11 fastest junior 100 m times that year. His most memorable victory came in the 100 m invitational race at the Drake Relays in Des Moines, Iowa, where he defeated his idol Carl Lewis (nine-time Olympic gold medalist), Mark Witherspoon (member of the 1992 US Olympic 100 m team), and Sam Jefferson (1994 NCAA 100 m champion).

Internationally, Thompson successfully defended his title in the 100 m at the Senior CAC Championships in Guatemala, while adding the 200 m title in a new championship record of 20.49 sec., which was the third-fastest time by a junior athlete that season. He was the youngest semifinalist in the 200 m at the World (Senior) Championships in Gothenburg, Sweden, and won a silver medal in the 100 m at the World University Games in Fukuoka, Japan.

=== Senior athletics ===
==== 1996 ====
Obadele started the 1996 season on fire, winning his first NCAA Indoor Championship in an NCAA indoor 200 m record. His time of 20.36 sec. shattered the old mark of 20.59 sec. set seven years earlier by four-time Olympic Champion, Michael Johnson, and equaling the then third-fast time in that event. To celebrate his 20th birthday, Thompson ran 45.38 sec. in his first competitive 400 m since he was 13 years old. Two weeks later, in his season-opening 100 m, he clocked the fastest time ever recorded by a human under any conditions—a wind-assisted time of 9.69 sec.—which could not be ratified as an official world record because the tailwind (+5 m/s) far exceeded the +2.0 m/s legal limit. This performance broke the mark set by Carl Lewis in 1988 (9.78 sec.) and stood for 12 years until Tyson Gay ran a wind-aided 9.68 sec. at the 2008 US Olympic Trials.

Thompson sustained a groin injury during that race, forcing him to miss practice for a week. Injuries struck again months later in the semifinals of the 100 and 200 metres (groin and hamstring strains, respectively) at the 1996 NCAA Outdoor Championships in Eugene, Oregon. He withdrew from the meet, extinguishing the anticipated showdown with Trinidadian sprinter, Ato Boldon of UCLA.

Sidelined by those injuries for three weeks, Thompson's once bright Olympic prospects darkened grimly as he returned to training with only one month to prepare for his first Olympic Games. At the 1996 Atlanta Olympics, he reached the 100 m semifinals, but exceeded expectations by finishing fourth in the 200 m finals behind Michael Johnson, who set an amazing new world record of 19.32 sec., Frankie Fredericks of Namibia (19.68 sec.) and Boldon (19.80 sec.). Obadele's fourth-place run of 20.14 sec. established a new Barbados national record, and placed him ahead of Mike Marsh (the defending Olympic 200 m champion) and Jeff Williams (1995 World Championship 200 m bronze medalist). At only 20 years old, Track & Field News magazine ranked Thompson #5 in the 200 m in the world.

==== 1997 ====
Obadele started his senior collegiate season by winning the WAC indoor 55 m in 5.99 sec.—a new NCAA record and his second world record. He is the first and only man to go under the 6-second barrier in that event. At the NCAA Indoor Championships, he became the third male athlete to win back-to-back 200 m titles. Unfortunately, he false started in the 55 m finals, despite being heavily favoured to win after running 6.08 sec. in the semifinals, which was 0.10 sec. faster than all competitors at the entire meet. In May, he defeated the 1996 Olympic 100 m champion and world record holder, Donovan Bailey, in the 100 m in Tempe, Arizona. Thompson also co-captained his team to back-to-back WAC Outdoor titles. In rainy conditions at the NCCA Outdoor Championships in Bloomington, Indiana, he won the NCAA 100 and 200 metres in 10.13 sec. and 20.03 sec., respectively, running the latter into a heavy headwind. He became only the sixth person since 1969 to win this double.

==== Professional athletics career ====
===== 1997 =====
After the collegiate season, Thompson placed sixth in the 200 m at the 1997 World Championships in Athens, Greece. He also finished second in the same event at the IAAF Grand Prix Finals in Fukuoka, Japan. He moved up the Track & Field News rankings to #4 in the 200 m in the world.

===== 1998 =====
In the summer of 1998, Thompson relocated to Austin, Texas to work with Dan Pfaff, who had coached Bailey to the 1996 Olympic 100 m title. Pfaff helped Thompson shake off mid-season woes and finish the last two months of competition strongly. During that period, he broke the Barbados national 100 m record four times. On 5 September, he placed second in a photo finish to Fredericks in the 100 m Grand Prix Final in Moscow, Russia. A week later, on 11 September, he recorded his all-time personal best of 9.87 sec. en route to winning the 100 m at the World Cup in Athletics in Johannesburg, South Africa, erasing the championship record set by Ben Johnson in 1985. At the time, Thompson's performance was the fourth-fastest legal 100 m in history (only 0.03 sec. outside Bailey's world record Olympic victory of 9.84 sec.), and the second-fastest 100 m in 1998 (0.01 sec. behind Boldon's 9.86 sec.). Days later, on 17 September, he won the 100 m bronze medal at the Commonwealth Games in Kuala Lumpur, Malaysia, behind Boldon and Fredericks, after leaving the starting blocks last. Track & Field News ranked him #6 in the world in the 100 m.

===== 1999 =====
In March, Thompson won the silver medal in the 200 m at the IAAF World Indoor Championships in Maebashi, Japan. His time of 20.26 sec. was the then third-fastest all-time performance. Later that season, Thompson placed fourth in the 100 and 200 metres at the World Championships in Seville, Spain and Track & Field News ranked him #5 and #6 in those events, respectively.

===== 2000 =====
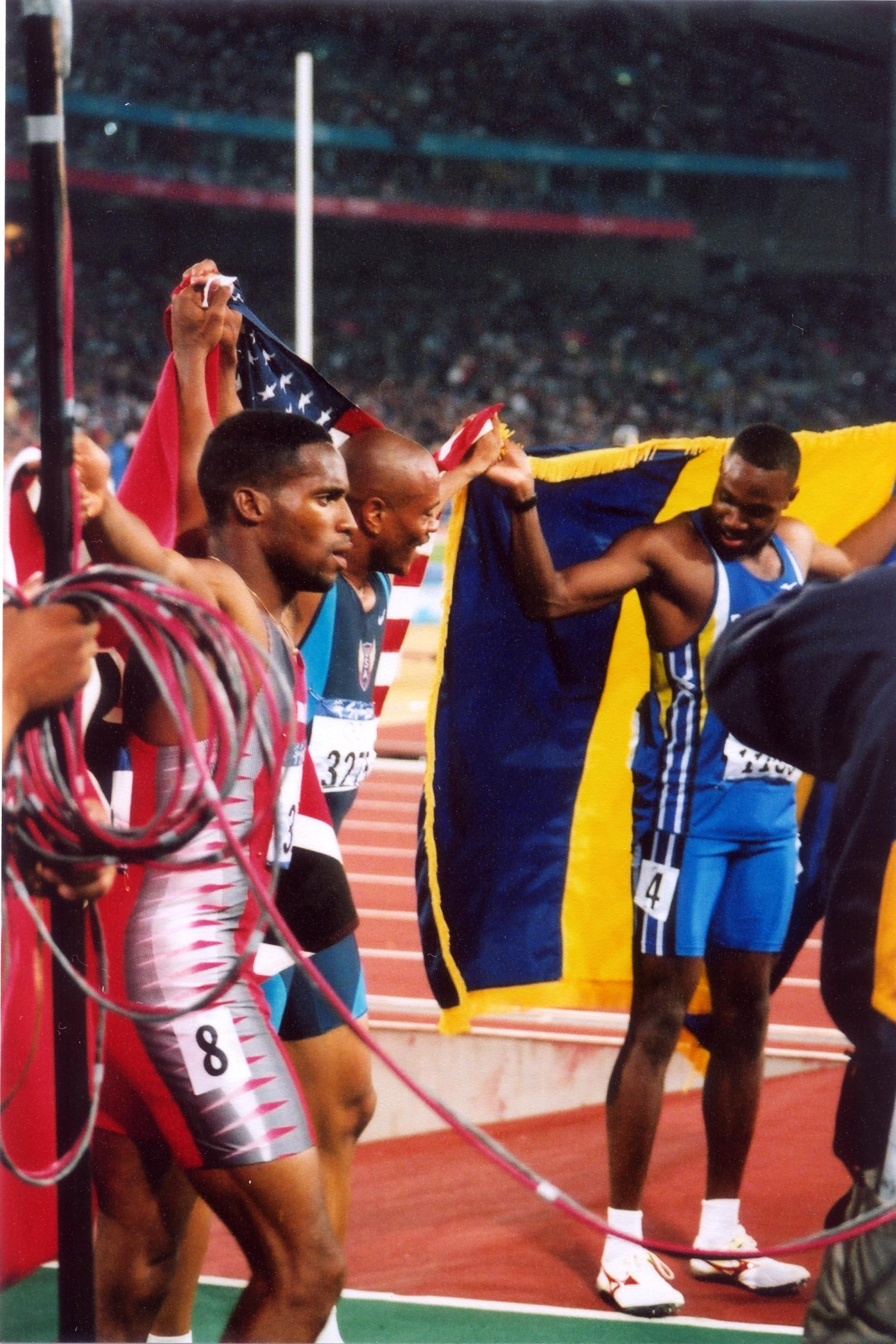
Thompson (right) posing with the other 100 m Olympic medallists

Obadele reached the zenith of his athletic career in 2000. After rounding into form on European track circuit, he injured his big toe while placing second to Maurice Greene in the 100 m at the Monaco Golden League meeting, forcing him to return to the US for treatment six weeks before the 2000 Sydney Games. He returned to competition ten days before the Games to set a 200 m personal best of 19.97 sec. in Yokohama, Japan. At the Games, he won the bronze medal in the 100 m in 10.04 sec. behind Greene (9.87 sec.) and Boldon (9.99 sec.) and placed fourth in the 200 m, although he and Boldon both ran 20.20 sec.

His bronze medal was Barbados' first and only Olympic medal and only the second Olympic medal won by a Barbadian athlete (at the 1960 Rome Olympics, Barbadian Jim Wedderburn won bronze with three Jamaicans on the West Indies Federation 4 x 400 metres relay team).

By season end, Track & Field News ranked Thompson #3 in the world in the 100 and 200 metres, while the International Association of Athletic Federations (IAAF) ranked him #3 in the 100 m and #2 in the 200 m.

==== Injury years ====
===== 2001 =====
Injuries ravished Thompson's 2001 season, and he competed sparing. Ironically, although he never ran a 200 m that season, he reached a career-high IAAF #1 world ranking in that event for several weeks based on his accumulated IAAF points. Three weeks before the 2001 World Championships in Edmonton, Alberta, Thompson sustained a pectoral tear during training but rebounded and narrowly missed making the 100 m finals while heavily bandaged.

===== 2002–2009 =====
The years 2002–2009 were very lean ones for Obadele, characterised primarily by recurring and new injuries and scant appearances on the track. After not racing for almost one year, he qualified for 2003 World Championships in Paris, France, but had the misfortune of encountering the eventual World Champion, Kim Collins, as well as Greene and Chambers (1999 World Championship 100 m bronze medallist) in the quarterfinals. Thompson's 10.14 sec. fourth-place clocking became the then-fastest performance not to make a 100 m semifinal.

Thompson raced sparingly and unremarkably in 2004, and just weeks before the 2004 Athens Olympics his participation was doubtful due to various injuries. However, he once more defied the odds when he reached and placed seventh in the 100 m finals in 10.10 sec., despite his injuries and not competing for six weeks entering the Games.

In 2005, Thompson returned to competing in the 200 m outdoors for the first time since the 2000 Sydney Olympic finals five years earlier. He placed fourth at the CAC Championships in Nassau, Bahamas in a season-best 20.53 sec. behind the 19-year-old emerging sprint sensation, Usain Bolt, who won in 20.03 sec.

In 2008, Thompson sustained another hamstring injury during the Barbados Olympic trials that ended his hopes of participating in the 2008 Beijing Olympics. In April 2009, he retired from athletics by winning his final race, a 200 m at a college invitational race in Austin, Texas.

== Personal life ==
Thompson was born in St. Michael to Professor Alvin O. Thompson, a Guyanese professor emeritus of African and Caribbean history at the University of the West Indies (UWI) Cave Hill, Barbados, and Hilda Thompson, a registered nurse from Bermuda. Although Prof. Thompson never earned an athletic scholarship nor had formal coaching, he won the 100 m at the 1963 Jamaica National Championships, while studying at UWI in Mona, Jamaica. In 1966, as a postgraduate student at the University of London, he won the 100 m at British Universities Championships, earned the Arthur Wint Award for the most significant performance at the London University's Athletic Championships, and was awarded the prestigious University of London's "Purple" for his sporting excellence.

In February 2007, Thompson married former American sprinter and basketball player, Marion Jones. They have three children.

== Recognition in Barbados ==
In 1995, Barbadian soca band, Krosfyah, released the song Obadelepraising Thompson's outstanding achievements. Lead singer, Edwin Yearwood, won the 1995 Pic-O-De-Crop Calypso Monarch singing this tune, which became highly popular throughout in the Caribbean region and with the Caribbean diaspora.

On his return to Barbados after his Olympic medal-winning performance, Thompson was greeted by thousands of well-wishers who lined the streets as his motorcade travelled from the airport to the Barbados Government headquarters, where the former Prime Minister, Owen Arthur, conferred on him the title of Ambassador and Special Envoy for Youth. Thompson was awarded the country's fourth highest award, the Barbados Service Star Award, for his outstanding contribution to sports (1997), the Barbados Minister's Award for Sports (2004), and was three times named the Barbados National Sports Personality of the year (1994, 1996, and 2000).

== Civic involvement ==
Thompson has been involved with the Barbados Special Olympics and featured in an advertising campaign against drug abuse for the United Nations Drug Control Programme. He also filmed a television commercial for UNICEF's "The Rights of Children" to draw attention to the treatment and rights of children. An asthmatic since three years old, Thompson participated in the 2001 World Asthma Day and filmed a television commercial based on his experience as a lifelong asthmatic.

== Notable public features ==
Thompson was featured in his own NBC Olympic television commercial shown during the 1999 MLB World Series.

== Personal bests ==
| Event | Time | Date | Venue |
|---|---|---|---|
| 55 m | 5.99 | 22 February 1997 | U.S. Air Force Academy, Colorado Springs |
| 60 m | 6.56 | 19 February 1999 | Fairfax, Virginia |
| 100 m | 9.87 | 11 September 1998 | Johannesburg, South Africa |
| 200 m | 19.97 | 9 September 2000 | Yokohama, Japan |
| 400 m | 45.38 | 30 March 1996 | El Paso, Texas |

== Performances at international competitions ==
| Year | Competition | Venue | Position | Event | Notes |
Representing Barbados
| 1991 | CARIFTA Games (U-17) | Port of Spain, Trinidad and Tobago | 1st | 100 m | 10.5 (2.6 m/s) w |
| 1991 | CARIFTA Games (U-17) | Port of Spain, Trinidad and Tobago | 3rd | 200 m | 22.26 |
| 1992 | CARIFTA Games (U-17) | Nassau, Bahamas | 1st | 100 m | 10.59 w |
| 1992 | CARIFTA Games (U-17) | Nassau, Bahamas | 2nd | 200 m | 21.61 |
| 1992 | CARIFTA Games (U-20) | Nassau, Bahamas | 2nd | 4 × 100 m relay | 41.84 |
| 1993 | CARIFTA Games (U-20) | Fort-de-France, Martinique | 1st | 100 m | 10.71 (−0.9 m/s) |
| 1993 | CARIFTA Games (U-20) | Fort-de-France, Martinique | 2nd | 200 m | 21.42 (−0.3 m/s) |
| 1993 | CARIFTA Games (U-20) | Fort-de-France, Martinique | 3rd | 4 × 100 m relay | 42.47 |
| 1993 | Central American and Caribbean Championships | Cali, Colombia | 1st | 100 m | 10.30 w |
| 1993 | Pan American Junior Championships | Winnipeg, Canada | 3rd | 100m | 10.76 |
| 1993 | Pan American Junior Championships | Winnipeg, Canada | 2nd | 200m | 21.18 w |
| 1994 | CARIFTA Games (U-20) | Bridgetown, Barbados | 1st | 100 m | 10.33 |
| 1994 | CARIFTA Games (U-20) | Bridgetown, Barbados | 1st | 200 m | 20.71 |
| 1994 | Central American and Caribbean Junior Championships | Port of Spain, Trinidad | 1st | 100m | 10.0 (−0.3 m/s) |
| 1994 | Central American and Caribbean Junior Championships | Port of Spain, Trinidad | 1st | 200m | 21.1 (−0.2 m/s) |
| 1994 | World Junior Championships | Lisbon, Portugal | 4th | 100m | 10.29 (wind: +1.2 m/s) |
| 1994 | World Junior Championships | Lisbon, Portugal | 5th (sf) | 200 m | 21.28 (wind: +1.9 m/s) |
| 1995 | Central American and Caribbean Championships | Guatemala City, Guatemala | 1st | 100 m | 10.18 A |
| 1995 | Central American and Caribbean Championships | Guatemala City, Guatemala | 1st | 200 m | 20.49 A CR |
| 1995 | Universiade | Fukuoka, Japan | 2nd | 100 m | 10.34 (1.3 m/s) |
| 1995 | World Championships | Gothenburg, Sweden | 5th (qf) | 100 m | 10.30 (−0.5 m/s) |
| 1995 | World Championships | Gothenburg, Sweden | 7th (sf) | 200 m | 20.66 (−0.9 m/s) |
| 1996 | Olympic Games | Atlanta, United States | 6th (sf) | 100m | 10.16 (−0.5 m/s) |
| 1996 | Olympic Games | Atlanta, United States | 4th | 200m | 20.14 (0.4 m/s) |
| 1997 | World Championships | Athens, Greece | 6th (sf) | 100 m | 10.30 (−0.8 m/s) |
| 1997 | World Championships | Athens, Greece | 6th | 200m | 20.37 (2.3 m/s) w |
| 1997 | IAAF Grand Prix Final | Fukuoka, Japan | 2nd | 200 m | 20.19 (0.3 m/s) |
| 1998 | Commonwealth Games | Kuala Lumpur, Malaysia | 3rd | 100m | 10.00 |
| 1998 | IAAF World Cup | Johannesburg, South Africa | 1st | 100 m | 9.87 (−0.2 m/s) NR |
| 1998 | IAAF Grand Prix Final | Moscow, Russia | 2nd | 100 m | 10.11 (0.1 m/s) |
| 1998 | Central American and Caribbean Games | Maracaibo, Venezuela | 1st | 100 m | 10.20 |
| 1999 | IAAF World Indoor Championships | Maebashi, Japan | 2nd | 200 m | 20.26 |
| 1999 | Central American and Caribbean Championships | Bridgetown, Barbados | 1st | 100 m | 10.23 |
| 1999 | World Championships | Seville, Spain | 4th | 100 m | 10.00 (0.2 m/s) |
| 1999 | World Championships | Seville, Spain | 4th | 200 m | 20.23 (1.2 m/s) |
| 1999 | IAAF Grand Prix Final | Munich, Germany | 4th | 200 m | 20.21 (−0.8 m/s) |
| 2000 | Summer Olympics | Sydney, Australia | 3rd | 100 m | 10.04 (−0.3 m/s) |
| 2000 | Summer Olympics | Sydney, Australia | 4th | 200 m | 20.20 (−0.6 m/s) |
| 2001 | World Championships | Edmonton, Canada | 5th (sf) | 100 m | 10.31 (−1.7 m/s) |
| 2002 | Commonwealth Games | Manchester, England | — | 100 m | DNS (qf) |
| 2003 | World Championships | Paris, France | 4th (qf) | 100 m | 10.14 (0.6 m/s) |
| 2004 | Summer Olympics | Athens, Greece | 7th | 100 m | 10.10 (0.6 m/s) |
| 2005 | Central American and Caribbean Championships | Nassau, Bahamas | 4th | 200m | 20.53 (1.8 m/s) |
| 2005 | World Championships | Helsinki, Finland | 6th (qf) | 100 m | 10.34 (−1.0 m/s) |
| 2005 | World Championships | Helsinki, Finland | — | 200 m | DNS (h) |

== NCAA titles ==
- NCAA Indoor Championships
  - 200 m: 1996, 1997
- NCAA Outdoor Championships
  - 100 m: 1997
  - 200 m: 1997

=== Track records ===
As of 6 September 2024, Thompson holds the following track records for 100 metres and 200 metres.

==== 100 metres ====
| Location | Time | Windspeed m/s | Date |
|---|---|---|---|
| El Paso, Texas | 9.69 | + 5.7 | 13/04/1996 |
| Johannesburg | 9.87; NR | – 0.2 | 11/09/1998 |

==== 200 metres ====
| Location | Time | Windspeed m/s | Date |
|---|---|---|---|
| El Paso, Texas | 20.16 | + 5.0 | 15/04/2000 |
| Yokohama | 19.97; NR | – 0.9 | 09/09/2000 |

Records
Olympic Games
| Preceded by Elvis Forde | Flagbearer for Barbados; Atlanta 1996 | Succeeded by Andrea Blackett |
