= Michael Maskell (sport shooter) =

Barbadian sports shooter

Personal information
- Full name: Michael John Maskell
- Nationality: Barbados
- Born: 24 November 1966 (age 59) Bridgetown, Barbados
- Height: 1.80 m (5 ft 11 in)
- Weight: 99 kg (218 lb)

Sport
- Sport: Shooting
- Event: Skeet (SK125)

Michael John Maskell (born November 24, 1966, in Bridgetown) is a Barbadian sport shooter. Maskell represented Barbados in five editions of the Olympic Games -- 1992, 1996, 2000, 2004 and 2016 -- having narrowly missed reaching the final podium twice in men's skeet shooting at both the 1999 and 2011 Pan American Games.

Twelve years after competing in his first Olympics, Maskell qualified for his fourth Barbadian team, as a 37-year-old, in men's skeet shooting at the 2004 Summer Olympics held in Athens by receiving a wild card place from ISSF through a re-allocation of unused quota. Building his own milestone as a four-time Olympian, Maskell was appointed by the Barbados Olympic Association to carry the nation's flag in the opening ceremony. After finishing twenty-fifth in Barcelona (1992) for mixed skeet, forty-ninth in Atlanta (1996), and twenty-third in Sydney (2000), his highest ever placement, Maskell did not improve his standard in the same program, as he hit a total of 117 targets to share a thirty-first-place finish with Chile's Jorge Atalah and Germany's Axel Wegner.

== Olympic results ==
Olympic results
Event	1992	1996	2000	2004	2016
Skeet	25th 145	49th 112	23rd 119	31st 117	18th 118
