= Barbados Olympic Association =

National Olympic Committee

- Country: Barbados
- Code: BAR
- Created: 1962
- Recognized: 1962
- Continental Association: PASO
- President: Sandra Osborne
- Secretary General: Erskine Simmons
- Website: www.olympic.org.bb

The Barbados Olympic Association, founded in 1962, is the National Olympic Committee for Barbados. The body is also responsible for Barbados' representation at the Commonwealth Games.

== History ==
Formed after the dissolution of the West Indies Federation in 1962, the Barbados Olympic Association (BOA) first competed at Olympic level at the 1968 Summer Olympics and has continued to compete at every Olympics since excluding the 1980 Summer Olympics in Moscow. The Barbados Olympic Association was affiliated to the International Olympic Committee in 1956, a year after its founding.

The President Sandra Osborne currently heads up the organization. With Ralph Johnson serving as Vice-President and Erskine Simmons serving as current Secretary General.

On May 29, 2009 the BOA and the Canadian Olympic Committee signed a Memorandum of Understanding (MOU) for co-operation between both bodies.

The deal covers a pledge of both national Olympic committees to develop stronger partnerships between sport federations of Canada and Barbados with athlete development an area of focus. This includes the free exchange of coaches, officials, trainers, judges, experts and scientists for participation in seminars, courses and counselling.

== See also ==
- Barbados at the Olympics
- Barbados at the Commonwealth Games
- Barbados Lottery
- British West Indies at the Olympics
