= British West Indies at the 1960 Summer Olympics =

- Flag of the West Indies Federation
- IOC code: BWI (ANT used at these Games)
- NOC: West Indies Olympic Association

in Rome
- Competitors: 13 in 5 sports
- Medals Ranked 148th: Gold 0 Silver 0 Bronze 2 Total 2

Summer Olympics appearances (overview)
- 1960

Other related appearances
- Jamaica (1948–1956, 1964–pres.); Trinidad and Tobago (1948–1956, 1964–pres.); Barbados (1968–pres.)

Athletes from the West Indies Federation competed under the name Antilles (ANT), renamed to British West Indies (BWI) by the IOC, at the 1960 Summer Olympics in Rome, Italy. Thirteen competitors—two from Barbados, four from Trinidad, and seven from Jamaica—all men, took part in thirteen events in five sports. The short-lived nation only participated at these single Games, as Jamaica and Trinidad and Tobago competed independently again in 1964, and Barbados started competing at the 1968 Games as the federation did not compete at the 1960 Winter Olympics in Squaw Valley. The team won two bronze medals, both in track and field athletics.

== Timeline of participation ==
Olympic Year/s	Teams		
1948–1956	Jamaica	Trinidad and Tobago	
1960	British West Indies		
1964	Jamaica	Trinidad and Tobago	
1968–present	Jamaica	Trinidad and Tobago	Barbados

== Medal tables ==
=== Medals by Summer Games ===
Games	Athletes	Gold	Silver	Bronze	Total	Rank
1960 Rome	13	0	0	2	2	39
Total		0	0	2	2	148

=== Medals by summer sport ===
Sport	Gold	Silver	Bronze	Total
Athletics	0	0	2	2
Totals (1 entries)	0	0	2	2

== List of medalists ==
Medal	Name	Sport	Event	Date
Bronze	George Kerr (JAM)	Athletics	Men's 800 metres	September 2
Bronze	George Kerr (JAM); Jim Wedderburn (BAR); Keith Gardner (JAM); Malcolm Spence (JAM)	Athletics	Men's 4×400 metre relay	September 8

== Results by event ==
=== Athletics ===
Event	Name	Result
Men's 100 metres	Dennis Johnson	Heats: 10.4 (2nd in heat); Quarter-finals: 10.4 (4th, did not advance)
Men's 200 metres	Clifton Bertrand	Heats: 21.3 (3rd in heat); Quarter-finals: 21.4 (6th, did not advance)
Men's 200 metres	Dennis Johnson	Heats: 21.2 (1st in heat); Quarter-finals: 21.1 (3rd); Semi-finals: 21.0 (5th, did not advance)
Men's 400 metres	Malcolm Spence	Heats: 47.6 (1st in heat); Quarter-finals: 46.9 (3rd); Semi-finals: 46.8 (5th, did not advance)
Men's 400 metres	James Wedderburn	Heats: 47.4 (2nd in heat); Quarter-finals: 47.0 (4th, did not advance)
Men's 800 metres	George Kerr	Heats: 1:50.9 (1st in heat); Quarter-finals: 1:49.4 (1st); Semi-final: 1:47.1 (1st); Final: 1:47.1 (→ Bronze)
Men's 4×400 metre relay	George Kerr; James Wedderburn; Keith Gardner; Malcolm Spence	Heats: 3:09.1 (1st in heat); Semi-final: 3:09.2 (2nd); Final: 3:04.0 (→ Bronze)
Men's 110 metre hurdles	Keith Gardner	Heats: 14.3 (1st in heat); Quarter-finals: 14.3 (2nd); Semi-final: 14.2 (3rd); Final: 14.4 (→ 5th place)
Men's long jump	Paul Foreman	Qualification: 7.42 m Final: 7.26 m (→ 12th place)

=== Cycling ===
Event	Name	Result
Individual road race	Clyde Rimple	DNF
Sprint	Clyde Rimple	Heats: 2nd of 2 Repechage: 1st of 2 Repechage final: 2nd of 3 Eighth-finals: 3rd of 3 Eighth-finals repechage: 2nd of 3 (did not advance)
Time trial	Clyde Rimple	1:16.08 (→ 23rd place)

=== Sailing ===
Event	Name	Result
Flying Dutchman class	Richard John Bennett; Gerald Bird	893 points (→ 30th place)

=== Shooting ===
Event	Name	Result
50 m free pistol	Tony Bridge	Qualification: 319 (→ 32nd in group, did not advance)
50 m free pistol	Keith De Casseres	(retired)

=== Weightlifting ===
Event	Name	Result
Bantamweight (57 kg)	Grantley Sobers	Press: 97.5 kg (7th); Snatch: 90.0 kg (12th); Jerk: 120.0 kg (13th); Total: 307.5 kg (→ 10th place)
