= Athletics at the 2016 Summer Olympics – Qualification =

For the athletics competitions at the 2016 Summer Olympics, the following qualification systems were in place. Qualification ended on 11 July 2016.

== Russian disqualification ==
Because of the suspension of the Russian Athletics Federation by the IAAF, due to widespread doping violations, Russia currently will not qualify as a team for these Olympics or other international competitions, and unless this suspension is lifted in time, Russia will be unable to send an athletics delegation to these Games. While Russia will continue to seek further appeals, the IAAF confirmed its decision on 18 June 2016 after a report by a five-member task force which reported that Russia had failed to fully address its "deep-seeded [sic] culture" of doping. The IAAF did provide for the possibility of accepting individual Russian athletes who have been sufficiently tested outside of the Russian system. One athlete suggested was Yuliya Stepanova for her efforts to expose the scandal.

The systematic doping that has been ongoing in Russia, it's difficult to pick the clean athletes. As you know, one or two or 100 negative tests does not mean an athlete is clean. History has not shown that is the case.

— Rune Anderson, IAAF Task Force Chairman

The IAAF then stated on 24 June, that athletes from Russia seeking "exceptional eligibility for International Competition under Competition Rule 22.1A" will be considered and have the permission to compete, "not for Russia but as a neutral athlete", following guidelines. These athletes have to clearly and convincingly show that they are not co involved in the Russian system (outside the country and subject to other systems). On 1 July 2016, Yuliya Stepanova became the first neutral athlete to be qualified under these rules. Darya Klishina, who lives in the United States, has also been given permission. They will compete as Independent Olympic Athletes. The Court of Arbitration for Sport confirms that verdict and rejects the appeal of 68 Russian athletes, on 21 July 2016. Whistleblower Stepanova was eventually barred from competing by the IOC, and she was called a traitor and received death threats back at home in Russia.

== Qualifying standards ==
Different from the previous Olympics, a National Olympic Committee (NOC) may enter up to 3 qualified athletes in each individual event if all athletes meet the entry standard during the qualifying period. An NOC may also enter a maximum of 1 qualified relay team per event. NOCs may enter athletes regardless of time (1 athlete per sex) if they have no athletes meeting the entry standard. This makes it possible for every nation to have a minimum of two representatives in the sport.

The qualifying time standards may be obtained in various meets during the given period that have the approval of the IAAF. All approved outdoor meets and indoor meets with the exception of 100 m, 200 m and 110/100 m hurdles races are eligible. The qualifying period for the 10,000 m, marathon, walks, and combined events was from 1 January 2015 to 11 July 2016 and for the remaining events, from 1 May 2015 to 11 July 2016.

For the relays, a maximum of sixteen qualified NOCs shall be entitled to each event. The top eight teams in each event at the 2015 IAAF World Relays (held in Nassau, Bahamas on 2–3 May 2015) guaranteed a spot on their respective NOCs for the Olympics. The remaining half in each event are selected according to IAAF World Ranking List as of 12 July 2016 based on the aggregate of the 2 fastest times achieved by NOCs during the given period.

In addition to the qualifying standards below, marathon runners finishing in the top 20 of the 2015 IAAF World Championships or in the top 10 of any IAAF Gold Label marathon within the qualification period are also treated as having earned the A standard.

The NOCs are still allowed to select athletes using their own rules, on the condition that all of them have made the qualifying time. For example, the United States selects athletes based on the result of the 2016 United States Olympic Trials event, but has a policy of entering every athlete so qualified. Sweden only enters athletes good enough to reach at least the eighth position, based on an assessment by the Swedish NOC.

The IAAF Qualifying Standards are as follows:

Men's events		Women's events	
Event	Entry mark	Event	Entry mark
100 m	10.16	100 m	11.32
200 m	20.50	200 m	23.20
400 m	45.40	400 m	52.20
800 m	1:46.00	800 m	2:01.50
1500 m	3:36.20	1500 m	4:07.00
5000 m	13:25.00	5000 m	15:24.00
10,000 m	28:00.00	10,000 m	32:15.00
110 m hurdles	13.47	100 m hurdles	13.00
400 m hurdles	49.40	400 m hurdles	56.20
3000 m steeplechase	8:30.00	3000 m steeplechase	9:45.00
Marathon	2:19:00	Marathon	2:45:00
20 km walk	1:24:00	20 km walk	1:36:00
50 km walk	4:06:00	—N/a	—N/a
Long jump	8.15	Long jump	6.70
Triple jump	16.85	Triple jump	14.15
High jump	2.29	High jump	1.93
Pole vault	5.70	Pole vault	4.50
Shot put	20.50	Shot put	17.75
Discus throw	65.00	Discus throw	61.00
Hammer throw	77.00	Hammer throw	71.00
Javelin throw	83.00	Javelin throw	62.00
Decathlon	8100	Heptathlon	6200
4 × 100 m relay	Top 8 at IWR + 8 from top lists	4 × 100 m relay	Top 8 at IWR + 8 from top lists
4 × 400 m relay	Top 8 at IWR + 8 from top lists	4 × 400 m relay	Top 8 at IWR + 8 from top lists

== Track events ==
=== Men's track events ===
==== Men's 100 m ====
Does not include indoor achievements

Qualification standard	No. of athletes	NOC	Nominated athletes
Entry standard – 10.16	3	Bahamas	Adrian Griffith; Shavez Hart; Jamial Rolle
Entry standard – 10.16	3	Canada	Aaron Brown; Andre De Grasse; Akeem Haynes
Entry standard – 10.16	3	China	Su Bingtian; Zhang Peimeng; Xie Zhenye
Entry standard – 10.16	3	Great Britain	James Dasaolu; James Ellington; Chijindu Ujah
Entry standard – 10.16	3	Jamaica	Nickel Ashmeade; Yohan Blake; Usain Bolt
Entry standard – 10.16	3	Japan	Yoshihide Kiryū; Asuka Cambridge; Ryota Yamagata
Entry standard – 10.16	3	Saint Kitts and Nevis	Kim Collins; Antoine Adams; Brijesh Lawrence
Entry standard – 10.16	3	South Africa	Henricho Bruintjies; Akani Simbine; Anaso Jobodwana
Entry standard – 10.16	3	Trinidad and Tobago	Richard Thompson; Rondell Sorrillo; Keston Bledman
Entry standard – 10.16	3	Turkey	Emre Zafer Barnes; Ramil Guliyev; Jak Ali Harvey
Entry standard – 10.16	3	United States	Justin Gatlin; Trayvon Bromell; Marvin Bracy
Entry standard – 10.16	2	Antigua and Barbuda	Daniel Bailey; Cejhae Greene
Entry standard – 10.16	2	Barbados	Ramon Gittens; Levi Cadogan
Entry standard – 10.16	2	Bahrain	Andrew Fisher; Kemarley Brown
Entry standard – 10.16	2	France	Jimmy Vicaut; Christophe Lemaitre
Entry standard – 10.16	2	Germany	Lucas Jakubczyk; Julian Reus
Entry standard – 10.16	2	Iran	Reza Ghasemi; Hassan Taftian
Entry standard – 10.16	2	Ivory Coast	Hua Wilfried Koffi; Ben Youssef Meïté
Entry standard – 10.16	2	Netherlands	Solomon Bockarie; Churandy Martina
Entry standard – 10.16	3	Nigeria	Monzavous Edwards; Seye Ogunlewe; Ogho-Oghene Egwero
Entry standard – 10.16	1	Australia	Josh Clarke
Entry standard – 10.16	1	Brazil	Vitor Hugo dos Santos
Entry standard – 10.16	1	Botswana	Karabo Mothibi
Entry standard – 10.16	1	Cayman Islands	Kemar Hyman
Entry standard – 10.16	1	Cuba	Roberto Skyers
Entry standard – 10.16	1	Dominican Republic	Yancarlos Martinez
Entry standard – 10.16	1	Ghana	Sean Safo-Antwi
Entry standard – 10.16	1	Haiti	Darrell Wesh
Entry standard – 10.16	1	Italy	Jacques Riparelli
Entry standard – 10.16	1	Lesotho	Mosito Lehata
Entry standard – 10.16	1	Liberia	Emmanuel Matadi
Entry standard – 10.16	1	Morocco	Aziz Ouhadi
Entry standard – 10.16	1	Oman	Barakat Mubarak Al-Harthi
Entry standard – 10.16	1	Qatar	Femi Ogunode
Entry standard – 10.16	1	Portugal	Yazaldes Nascimento
Entry standard – 10.16	1	Saint Lucia	Jahvid Best
Entry standard – 10.16	1	Saudi Arabia	Abdullah Abkar Mohammed
Entry standard – 10.16	1	South Korea	Kim Kuk-young
Entry standard – 10.16	1	Spain	Bruno Hortelano
Entry standard – 10.16	1	Suriname	Jurgen Themen
Entry standard – 10.16	1	Ukraine	Serhiy Smelyk
Entry standard – 10.16	1	Zambia	Gerald Phiri
Entry standard – 10.16	1	Zimbabwe	Gabriel Mvumvure
Invitational places	1	Palestine	Mohammed Abu Khoussa
Universality places	1	Afghanistan	Abdul Wahib Zahiri
Universality places	1	American Samoa	Isaac Silafau
Universality places	1	Angola	Hermenegildo Leite
Universality places	1	Bangladesh	Mezbahuddin Ahmed
Universality places	1	Brunei	Mohamed Fakhri Ismail
Universality places	1	Federated States of Micronesia	Kitson Kapiriel
Universality places	1	Gabon	Wilfried Bingangoye
Universality places	1	Guinea	Mohamed Lamine Dansoko
Universality places	1	Guinea-Bissau	Holder da Silva
Universality places	1	Honduras	Rolando Palacios
Universality places	1	Indonesia	Sudirman Hadi
Universality places	1	Kiribati	John Ruuka
Universality places	1	Maldives	Hassan Saaid
Universality places	1	Malta	Luke Bezzina
Universality places	1	Marshall Islands	Richson Simeon
Universality places	1	Mauritania	Jidou El Moctar
Universality places	1	Palau	Rodman Teltull
Universality places	1	Tonga	Siueni Filimone
Universality places	1	Singapore	Timothee Yap
Universality places	1	Sierra Leone	Ishmail Kamara
Universality places	1	Benin	Didier Kiki
Universality places	1	Macedonia	Riste Pandev
Universality places	1	Tuvalu	Etimoni Timuani
Total	88		

As of 10 July 2016

==== Men's 200 m ====
Does not include indoor achievements

Qualification standard	No. of athletes	NOC	Nominated athletes
Entry standard – 20.50	3	Brazil	Aldemir da Silva Junior; Vitor Hugo dos Santos; Jorge Vides
Entry standard – 20.50	3	Canada	Aaron Brown; Andre De Grasse; Brendon Rodney
Entry standard – 20.50	3	Great Britain	Adam Gemili; Danny Talbot; Nethaneel Mitchell-Blake
Entry standard – 20.50	3	Italy	Eseosa Desalu; Davide Manenti; Matteo Galvan
Entry standard – 20.50	3	Jamaica	Nickel Ashmeade; Yohan Blake; Usain Bolt
Entry standard – 20.50	3	Japan	Kenji Fujimitsu; Shota Iizuka; Kei Takase
Entry standard – 20.50	3	South Africa	Anaso Jobodwana; Wayde van Niekerk; Akani Simbine
Entry standard – 20.50	3	United States	Justin Gatlin; LaShawn Merritt; Ameer Webb
Entry standard – 20.50	2	Bahamas	Shavez Hart; Demetrius Pinder
Entry standard – 20.50	2	Barbados	Levi Cadogan; Burkheart Ellis
Entry standard – 20.50	2	Botswana	Thebe Baboloki; Isaac Makwala
Entry standard – 20.50	2	Colombia	Bernardo Baloyes; Diego Palomeque
Entry standard – 20.50	2	Cuba	Roberto Skyers; Reynier Mena
Entry standard – 20.50	2	Dominican Republic	Yancarlos Martínez; Stanly del Carmen
Entry standard – 20.50	2	Kenya	Carvin Nkanata; Mike Mokamba
Entry standard – 20.50	2	Mexico	José Carlos Herrera; César Ramírez
Entry standard – 20.50	2	Netherlands	Churandy Martina; Solomon Bockarie
Entry standard – 20.50	2	Nigeria	Tega Odele; Ejowvokoghene Oduduru
Entry standard – 20.50	2	Trinidad and Tobago	Kyle Greaux; Rondel Sorrillo
Entry standard – 20.50	1	Antigua and Barbuda	Miguel Francis
Entry standard – 20.50	1	Australia	Alex Hartmann
Entry standard – 20.50	1	Belgium	Jonathan Borlée
Entry standard – 20.50	1	Bermuda	Harold Houston
Entry standard – 20.50	1	Greece	Lykourgos-Stefanos Tsakonas
Entry standard – 20.50	1	India	Dharambir Singh
Entry standard – 20.50	1	Ivory Coast	Hua Wilfried Koffi
Entry standard – 20.50	1	France	Christophe Lemaitre
Entry standard – 20.50	1	The Gambia	Adama Jammeh
Entry standard – 20.50	1	Germany	Alexio-Platini Menga
Entry standard – 20.50	1	Lesotho	Mosito Lehata
Entry standard – 20.50	1	Panama	Alonso Edward
Entry standard – 20.50	1	Poland	Karol Zalewski
Entry standard – 20.50	1	Qatar	Femi Ogunode
Entry standard – 20.50	1	Saint Kitts and Nevis	Antoine Adams
Entry standard – 20.50	1	Samoa	Jeremy Dodson
Entry standard – 20.50	1	Spain	Bruno Hortelano
Entry standard – 20.50	1	Turkey	Ramil Guliyev
Entry standard – 20.50	1	Costa Rica	Nery Brenes
Entry standard – 20.50	1	Ukraine	Serhiy Smelyk
Invitational places	1	Papua New Guinea	Theo Piniau
Universality places	1	Belize	Brandon Jones
Total	71		

As of 19 July 2016

==== Men's 400 m ====
Qualification standard	No. of athletes	NOC	Nominated athletes
Entry standard – 45.40	3	Botswana	Isaac Makwala; Onkabetse Nkobolo; Thebe Baboloki
Entry standard – 45.40	3	Great Britain	Matthew Hudson-Smith; Rabah Yousif; Martyn Rooney
Entry standard – 45.40	3	Jamaica	Fitzroy Dunkley; Javon Francis; Rusheen McDonald
Entry standard – 45.40	3	Kenya	Alphas Kishoyian; Raymond Kibet; Alex Sampao
Entry standard – 45.40	3	Trinidad and Tobago	Machel Cedenio; Lalonde Gordon; Deon Lendore
Entry standard – 45.40	3	United States	LaShawn Merritt; Gil Roberts; David Verburg
Entry standard – 45.40	2	Bahamas	Chris Brown; Steven Gardiner
Entry standard – 45.40	2	Belgium	Jonathan Borlée; Kevin Borlée
Entry standard – 45.40	2	Cuba	Yoandys Lescay; Raidel Acea
Entry standard – 45.40	2	Dominican Republic	Gustavo Cuesta; Luguelín Santos
Entry standard – 45.40	2	Grenada	Kirani James; Bralon Taplin
Entry standard – 45.40	2	Japan	Yuzo Kanemaru; Julian Walsh
Entry standard – 45.40	1	Bahrain	Abubakar Abbas
Entry standard – 45.40	1	Brazil	Hederson Estefani
Entry standard – 45.40	1	Colombia	Diego Palomeque
Entry standard – 45.40	1	Costa Rica	Nery Brenes
Entry standard – 45.40	1	Czech Republic	Pavel Maslák
Entry standard – 45.40	1	Guyana	Winston George
Entry standard – 45.40	1	India	Muhammad Anas
Entry standard – 45.40	1	Israel	Donald Sanford
Entry standard – 45.40	1	Italy	Matteo Galvan
Entry standard – 45.40	1	Netherlands	Liemarvin Bonevacia
Entry standard – 45.40	1	Nigeria	Erayokan Orukpe
Entry standard – 45.40	1	Poland	Rafał Omelko
Entry standard – 45.40	1	Qatar	Abdelalelah Haroun
Entry standard – 45.40	1	Saint Vincent and the Grenadines	Brandon Valentine-Parris
Entry standard – 45.40	1	Saudi Arabia	Yousef Ahmed Masrahi
Entry standard – 45.40	1	Slovenia	Luka Janežič
Entry standard – 45.40	1	South Africa	Wayde van Niekerk
Entry standard – 45.40	1	Ukraine	Vitaliy Butrym
Entry standard – 45.40	1	Venezuela	Alberth Bravo
Invitational places	1	Refugee Olympic Team	James Chiengjiek
Universality places	1	Chad	Bachir Mahamat
Universality places	1	Niger	Ousseini Djibo
Universality places	1	Pakistan	Mehboob Ali
Total	55		

As of 26 June 2016

==== Men's 800 m ====
Qualification standard	No. of athletes	NOC	Nominated athletes
Entry standard – 1:46.00	3	Algeria	Taoufik Makhloufi; Yassine Hathat; Amine Belferar
Entry standard – 1:46.00	3	Australia	Peter Bol; Luke Mathews; Jeff Riseley
Entry standard – 1:46.00	3	Kenya	Alfred Kipketer; Ferguson Rotich; David Rudisha
Entry standard – 1:46.00	3	Spain	Daniel Andújar; Álvaro de Arriba; Kevin López
Entry standard – 1:46.00	3	United States	Boris Berian; Charles Jock; Clayton Murphy
Entry standard – 1:46.00	2	Brazil	Kléberson Davide; Lutimar Paes
Entry standard – 1:46.00	2	Canada	Brandon McBride; Anthony Romaniw
Entry standard – 1:46.00	2	Great Britain	Michael Rimmer; Elliot Giles
Entry standard – 1:46.00	2	Morocco	Amine El Manaoui; Mostafa Smaili
Entry standard – 1:46.00	2	Poland	Adam Kszczot; Marcin Lewandowski
Entry standard – 1:46.00	2	Puerto Rico	Andrés Arroyo; Wesley Vázquez
Entry standard – 1:46.00	2	Qatar	Abubaker Haydar Abdalla; Abdulrahman Musaeb Balla
Entry standard – 1:46.00	2	South Africa	André Olivier; Reinhardt van Rensburg
Entry standard – 1:46.00	1	Bahrain	Abraham Rotich
Entry standard – 1:46.00	1	Bosnia and Herzegovina	Amel Tuka
Entry standard – 1:46.00	1	Botswana	Nijel Amos
Entry standard – 1:46.00	1	Burundi	Antoine Gakeme
Entry standard – 1:46.00	1	Colombia	Rafith Rodríguez
Entry standard – 1:46.00	1	Czech Republic	Jakub Holuša
Entry standard – 1:46.00	1	Denmark	Andreas Bube
Entry standard – 1:46.00	1	Djibouti	Ayanleh Souleiman
Entry standard – 1:46.00	1	Ethiopia	Mohammed Aman
Entry standard – 1:46.00	1	France	Pierre-Ambroise Bosse
Entry standard – 1:46.00	1	Ghana	Alex Amankwah
Entry standard – 1:46.00	1	India	Jinson Johnson
Entry standard – 1:46.00	1	Ireland	Mark English
Entry standard – 1:46.00	1	Italy	Giordano Benedetti
Entry standard – 1:46.00	1	Saudi Arabia	Ali Saad Al-Daran
Entry standard – 1:46.00	1	Slovakia	Jozef Repčík
Entry standard – 1:46.00	1	Slovenia	Žan Rudolf
Entry standard – 1:46.00	1	Sweden	Andreas Almgren
Invitational places	1	Luxembourg	Charles Grethen
Invitational places	1	Monaco	Brice Etès
Invitational places	1	Refugee Olympic Team	Yiech Biel
Universality places	1	Andorra	Pol Moya
Universality places	1	Central African Republic	Francky-Edgard Mbotto
Universality places	1	Cook Islands	Alex Beddoes
Universality places	1	Equatorial Guinea	Benjamín Enzema
Universality places	1	Guam	Joshua Ilustre
Universality places	1	Kosovo	Musa Hajdari
Total	58		

As of 11 July 2016

==== Men's 1500 m ====
Qualification standard	No. of athletes	NOC	Nominated athletes
Entry standard – 3:36.20	3	Kenya	Asbel Kiprop; Elijah Manangoi; Ronald Kwemoi
Entry standard – 3:36.20	3	Morocco	Fouad Elkaam; Abdalaati Iguider; Brahim Kaazouzi
Entry standard – 3:36.20	3	New Zealand	Nick Willis; Hamish Carson; Julian Matthews
Entry standard – 3:36.20	3	United States	Robby Andrews; Ben Blankenship; Matthew Centrowitz Jr.
Entry standard – 3:36.20	2	Algeria	Taoufik Makhloufi; Salim Keddar
Entry standard – 3:36.20	2	Canada	Charles Philibert-Thiboutot; Nathan Brannen
Entry standard – 3:36.20	2	Djibouti	Ayanleh Souleiman; Abdi Waiss Mouhyadin
Entry standard – 3:36.20	2	Great Britain	Charlie Grice; Chris O'Hare
Entry standard – 3:36.20	2	Spain	David Bustos; Adel Mechaal
Entry standard – 3:36.20	1	Azerbaijan	Hayle Ibrahimov
Entry standard – 3:36.20	1	Bahrain	Benson Seurei
Entry standard – 3:36.20	1	Belgium	Pieter-Jan Hannes
Entry standard – 3:36.20	1	Brazil	Thiago André
Entry standard – 3:36.20	1	Czech Republic	Jakub Holuša
Entry standard – 3:36.20	1	France	Florian Carvalho
Entry standard – 3:36.20	1	Germany	Homiyu Tesfaye
Entry standard – 3:36.20	1	Norway	Henrik Ingebrigtsen
Entry standard – 3:36.20	1	Peru	David Torrence
Entry standard – 3:36.20	1	Qatar	Mohamad Al-Garni
Entry standard – 3:36.20	1	Turkey	İlham Tanui Özbilen
Entry standard – 3:36.20	1	Uganda	Ronald Musagala
Invitational places	1	Nicaragua	Erick Rodríguez
Invitational places	1	Refugee Olympic Team	Paulo Lokoro
Universality places	1	South Sudan	Santino Kenyi
Total	38		

As of 10 June 2016

==== Men's 5000 m ====
Qualification standard	No. of athletes	NOC	Nominated athletes
Entry standard – 13:25.00	3	Eritrea	Abrar Osman; Aron Kifle; Awet Nftalem Kibrab
Entry standard – 13:25.00	3	Ethiopia	Muktar Edris; Dejen Gebremeskel; Hagos Gebrhiwet (Abadi Hadis)
Entry standard – 13:25.00	3	Great Britain	Andrew Butchart; Mo Farah; Tom Farrell
Entry standard – 13:25.00	3	Kenya	Caleb Ndiku; Isiah Koech; Cyrus Rutto
Entry standard – 13:25.00	3	Morocco	Soufiyan Bouqantar; Abdalaati Iguider; Younes Essalhi
Entry standard – 13:25.00	3	Spain	Antonio Abadía; Ilias Fifa; Adel Mechaal
Entry standard – 13:25.00	3	Uganda	Phillip Kipyeko; Ronald Musagala; Joshua Kiprui Cheptegei
Entry standard – 13:25.00	3	United States	Paul Chelimo; Bernard Lagat; Hassan Mead
Entry standard – 13:25.00	2	Bahrain	Aweke Ayalew; Albert Kibichii Rop
Entry standard – 13:25.00	2	Canada	Mohammed Ahmed; Lucas Bruchet
Entry standard – 13:25.00	2	Germany	Richard Ringer; Florian Orth
Entry standard – 13:25.00	2	Japan	Kota Murayama; Suguru Osako
Entry standard – 13:25.00	2	South Africa	Stephen Mokoka; Elroy Gelant
Entry standard – 13:25.00	1	Australia	Brett Robinson
Entry standard – 13:25.00	1	Belgium	Bashir Abdi
Entry standard – 13:25.00	1	Burundi	Olivier Irabaruta
Entry standard – 13:25.00	1	Italy	Jamel Chatbi
Entry standard – 13:25.00	1	Jamaica	Kemoy Campbell
Entry standard – 13:25.00	1	Norway	Sindre Buraas
Entry standard – 13:25.00	1	Peru	David Torrence
Entry standard – 13:25.00	1	Turkey	Ali Kaya
Invitational places			
Universality places	1	Malawi	Kefasi Chitsala
Universality places	1	Myanmar	San Naing
Universality places	1	Nepal	Hari Rimal
Universality places	1	São Tomé and Príncipe	Romário Leitão
Universality places	1	Solomon Islands	Rosefelo Siosi
Universality places	1	Somalia	Mohamed Daud Mohamed
Total	48		

As of 10 June 2016

==== Men's 10,000 m ====
Qualification standard	No. of athletes	NOC	Nominated athletes
Entry standard – 28:00.00	3	Eritrea	
Entry standard – 28:00.00	3	Ethiopia	Yigrem Demelash; Abadi Hadis; Tamirat Tola (Ibrahim Jeilan)
Entry standard – 28:00.00	3	Great Britain	Mo Farah; Ross Millington; Andy Vernon
Entry standard – 28:00.00	3	Japan	Kota Murayama; Suguru Osako; Yuta Shitara
Entry standard – 28:00.00	3	Kenya	Paul Kipngetich Tanui; Charles Muneria Yosei; Geoffrey Kamworor
Entry standard – 28:00.00	3	United States	Galen Rupp; Shadrack Kipchirchir; Leonard Essau Korir
Entry standard – 28:00.00	2	Australia	David McNeill; Ben St. Lawrence
Entry standard – 28:00.00	2	South Africa	Stephen Mokoka; Gladwin Mzazi
Entry standard – 28:00.00	2	Turkey	Ali Kaya; Polat Kemboi Arıkan
Entry standard – 28:00.00	2	Uganda	Joshua Kiprui Cheptegei; Timothy Toroitich
Entry standard – 28:00.00	1	Bahrain	El Hassan El-Abbassi
Entry standard – 28:00.00	1	Belgium	Bashir Abdi
Entry standard – 28:00.00	1	Burundi	Olivier Irabaruta
Entry standard – 28:00.00	1	Canada	Mohammed Ahmed
Entry standard – 28:00.00	1	Morocco	
Entry standard – 28:00.00	1	New Zealand	Zane Robertson
Entry standard – 28:00.00	1	Peru	Luis Ostos
Entry standard – 28:00.00	1	Tunisia	Wissem Hosni
Invitational places			
Universality places			
Total	33		

As of 10 June 2016

==== Men's 110 m hurdles ====
Do not include indoor achievements

Qualification standard	No. of athletes	NOC	Nominated athletes
Entry standard – 13.47	3	Cuba	Yordan O'Farrill; Dayron Robles; Jhoanis Portilla
Entry standard – 13.47	3	France	Pascal Martinot-Lagarde; Dimitri Bascou; Wilhem Belocian
Entry standard – 13.47	3	Germany	Alexander John; Gregor Traber; Matthias Bühler
Entry standard – 13.47	3	Jamaica	Omar McLeod; Deuce Carter; Hansle Parchment; Andrew Riley *including alternates
Entry standard – 13.47	3	United States	Devon Allen; Ronnie Ash; Jeff Porter
Entry standard – 13.47	2	Barbados	Shane Brathwaite; Greggmar Swift
Entry standard – 13.47	2	Brazil	João Vítor de Oliveira; Éder Souza
Entry standard – 13.47	2	Canada	Johnathan Cabral; Sekou Kaba
Entry standard – 13.47	2	Great Britain	Lawrence Clarke; Andrew Pozzi
Entry standard – 13.47	2	Poland	Damian Czykier; Artur Noga
Entry standard – 13.47	2	Spain	Yidiel Contreras; Orlando Ortega
Entry standard – 13.47	1	Cayman Islands	Ronald Forbes
Entry standard – 13.47	1	China	Xie Wenjun
Entry standard – 13.47	1	Colombia	Yeison Rivas
Entry standard – 13.47	1	Cyprus	Milan Trajkovic
Entry standard – 13.47	1	Czech Republic	Petr Svoboda
Entry standard – 13.47	1	Greece	Konstadinos Douvalidis
Entry standard – 13.47	1	Haiti	Jeffrey Julmis
Entry standard – 13.47	1	Hungary	Balázs Baji
Entry standard – 13.47	1	Japan	Wataru Yazawa
Entry standard – 13.47	1	Nigeria	Antwon Hicks
Entry standard – 13.47	1	Serbia	Milan Ristić
Entry standard – 13.47	1	South Africa	Antonio Alkana
Entry standard – 13.47	1	Trinidad and Tobago	Mikel Thomas
Entry standard – 13.47	1	Virgin Islands	Eddie Lovett
Invitational places	1	Lebanon	Ahmad Hazer
Universality places	1	Laos	Xaysa Anousone
Total	42		

As of 4 August 2016

==== Men's 400 m hurdles ====
Qualification standard	No. of athletes	NOC	Nominated athletes
Entry standard – 49.40	3	Brazil	Hederson Estefani; Mahau Suguimati; Marcio Teles
Entry standard – 49.40	3	Jamaica	Annsert Whyte; Jaheel Hyde; Roxroy Cato; Romel Lewis *including alternates
Entry standard – 49.40	3	Kenya	Aron Koech; Boniface Mucheru; Kiprono Kosgei
Entry standard – 49.40	3	United States	Kerron Clement; Byron Robinson; Michael Tinsley
Entry standard – 49.40	2	Algeria	Abdelmalik Lahoulou; Miloud Rahmani
Entry standard – 49.40	2	Estonia	Rasmus Mägi; Jaak-Heinrich Jagor
Entry standard – 49.40	2	Great Britain	Jack Green; Seb Rodger
Entry standard – 49.40	2	Japan	Yuki Matsushita; Keisuke Nozawa
Entry standard – 49.40	2	Puerto Rico	Javier Culson; Eric Alejandro
Entry standard – 49.40	2	South Africa	L.J. van Zyl; Cornel Fredericks
Entry standard – 49.40	1	Bahamas	Jeffery Gibson
Entry standard – 49.40	1	Belgium	Michaël Bultheel
Entry standard – 49.40	1	Cape Verde	Jordin Andrade
Entry standard – 49.40	1	Cuba	Omar Cisneros
Entry standard – 49.40	1	Ireland	Thomas Barr
Entry standard – 49.40	1	Kazakhstan	Dmitriy Koblov
Entry standard – 49.40	1	Nigeria	Miles Ukaoma
Entry standard – 49.40	1	Philippines	Eric Cray
Entry standard – 49.40	1	Poland	Patryk Dobek
Entry standard – 49.40	1	Spain	Sergio Fernández
Entry standard – 49.40	1	Switzerland	Kariem Hussein
Entry standard – 49.40	1	Chinese Taipei	Chen Chieh
Entry standard – 49.40	1	Trinidad and Tobago	Jehue Gordon
Entry standard – 49.40	1	Tunisia	Mohamed Sghaier
Entry standard – 49.40	1	Turkey	Yasmani Copello
Entry standard – 49.40	1	Uruguay	Andrés Silva
Invitational places	1	Germany	Tobias Giehl
Invitational places	1	Mozambique	Kurt Couto
Universality places	1	Seychelles	Ned Azemia
Total	42		

As of 18 June 2016

==== Men's 3000 m steeplechase ====
Qualification standard	No. of athletes	NOC	Nominated athletes
Entry standard – 8:30.00	3	Algeria	Hicham Bouchicha; Bilal Tabti; Ali Messaoudi
Entry standard – 8:30.00	3	Canada	Taylor Milne; Chris Winter; Matthew Hughes
Entry standard – 8:30.00	3	Ethiopia	Hailemariyam Amare; Chala Beyo; Tafese Seboka (Birhan Getahun)
Entry standard – 8:30.00	3	Kenya	Brimin Kipruto; Conseslus Kipruto; Ezekiel Kemboi
Entry standard – 8:30.00	3	Morocco	Soufiane Elbakkali; Hamid Ezzine; Hicham Sigueni
Entry standard – 8:30.00	3	Spain	
Entry standard – 8:30.00	3	United States	Hillary Bor; Donn Cabral; Evan Jager
Entry standard – 8:30.00	3	Turkey	Tarık Langat Akdağ; Halil Akkaş; Aras Kaya
Entry standard – 8:30.00	2	France	Yoann Kowal; Mahiedine Mekhissi-Benabbad
Entry standard – 8:30.00	1	Bahrain	John Kibet Koech
Entry standard – 8:30.00	1	Brazil	Altobeli da Silva
Entry standard – 8:30.00	1	Bulgaria	Mitko Tsenov
Entry standard – 8:30.00	1	Colombia	Gerard Giraldo
Entry standard – 8:30.00	1	Djibouti	Mohamed Ismail Ibrahim
Entry standard – 8:30.00	1	Great Britain	Rob Mullett
Entry standard – 8:30.00	1	Italy	Jamel Chatbi
Entry standard – 8:30.00	1	Poland	Krystian Zalewski
Entry standard – 8:30.00	1	Tunisia	Amor Ben Yahia
Entry standard – 8:30.00	1	Uganda	Benjamin Kiplagat
Entry standard – 8:30.00	1	Venezuela	Jose Peña
Invitational places	2	Italy	Yuri Floriani; Abdoullah Bamoussa
Invitational places	1	Belgium	Jeroen D'Hoedt
Invitational places	1	Denmark	Ole Hesselbjerg
Invitational places	1	Sudan	Abdalla Targan
Invitational places	1	Estonia	Kaur Kivistik
Universality places			
Total	35		

As of 10 June 2016

=== Women's track events ===
==== Women's 100 m ====
Does not include indoor achievements

Qualification standard	No. of athletes	NOC	Nominated athletes
Entry standard – 11.32	3	Brazil	Franciela Krasucki; Rosângela Santos; Ana Cláudia Lemos
Entry standard – 11.32	3	Great Britain	Asha Philip; Daryll Neita; Desirèe Henry
Entry standard – 11.32	3	Jamaica	Elaine Thompson; Shelly-Ann Fraser-Pryce; Christania Williams
Entry standard – 11.32	3	Trinidad and Tobago	Michelle-Lee Ahye; Semoy Hackett; Kelly-Ann Baptiste
Entry standard – 11.32	3	Ukraine	Nataliya Pohrebnyak; Olesya Povh; Hrystyna Stuy
Entry standard – 11.32	3	United States	English Gardner; Tianna Bartoletta; Tori Bowie
Entry standard – 11.32	2	Bahamas	Shaunae Miller; Tynia Gaither
Entry standard – 11.32	2	China	Wei Yongli; Yuan Qiqi
Entry standard – 11.32	2	Colombia	Evelyn Rivera; Eliecith Palacios
Entry standard – 11.32	2	Ecuador	Ángela Tenorio; Narcisa Landázuri
Entry standard – 11.32	2	Ivory Coast	Murielle Ahouré; Marie-Josée Ta Lou
Entry standard – 11.32	2	Germany	Rebekka Haase; Tatjana Pinto
Entry standard – 11.32	2	Kazakhstan	Olga Safronova; Viktoriya Zyabkina
Entry standard – 11.32	2	Nigeria	Blessing Okagbare; Peace Uko
Entry standard – 11.32	2	Poland	Ewa Swoboda; Marika Popowicz
Entry standard – 11.32	2	South Africa	Carina Horn; Alyssa Conley
Entry standard – 11.32	1	Australia	Melissa Breen
Entry standard – 11.32	1	British Virgin Islands	Tahesia Harrigan-Scott
Entry standard – 11.32	1	Bulgaria	Ivet Lalova
Entry standard – 11.32	1	Canada	Crystal Emmanuel
Entry standard – 11.32	1	Croatia	Andrea Ivančević
Entry standard – 11.32	1	Cuba	Arialis Gandulla
Entry standard – 11.32	1	Gabon	Ruddy Zang Milama
Entry standard – 11.32	1	Ghana	Flings Owusu-Agyapong
Entry standard – 11.32	1	Guyana	Brenessa Thompson
Entry standard – 11.32	1	India	Dutee Chand
Entry standard – 11.32	1	Japan	Chisato Fukushima
Entry standard – 11.32	1	Netherlands	Dafne Schippers
Entry standard – 11.32	1	Norway	Ezinne Okparaebo
Entry standard – 11.32	1	Portugal	Lorène Bazolo
Entry standard – 11.32	1	Switzerland	Mujinga Kambundji
Entry standard – 11.32	1	Uzbekistan	Nigina Sharipova
Invitational places	1	Papua New Guinea	Toea Wisil
Universality places	1	Afghanistan	Kamia Yousufi
Universality places	1	American Samoa	Jordan Mageo
Universality places	1	Angola	Liliana Neto
Universality places	1	Bangladesh	Shirin Akter
Universality places	1	Brunei	Maizurah Abdul Rahim
Universality places	1	Chad	Bibiro Ali Taher
Universality places	1	Cook Islands	Patricia Taea
Universality places	1	Federated States of Micronesia	Larissa Henry
Universality places	1	Fiji	Sisilia Seavula
Universality places	1	Guinea	Makoura Keita
Universality places	1	Guam	Regine Tugade
Universality places	1	Kiribati	Karitaake Tewaaki
Universality places	1	Laos	Laenly Phoutthavong
Universality places	1	Marshall Islands	Mariana Cress
Universality places	1	Sierra Leone	Hafsatu Kamara
Universality places	1	Tuvalu	Asenate Manoa
Total	69		

As of 25 June 2016

==== Women's 200 m ====
Does not include indoor achievements

Qualification standard	No. of athletes	NOC	Nominated athletes
Entry standard – 23.20	3	Bahamas	Shaunae Miller; Anthonique Strachan; Tynia Gaither
Entry standard – 23.20	3	Brazil	Vitória Cristina Rosa; Rosângela Santos; Kauiza Venâncio
Entry standard – 23.20	3	Canada	Crystal Emmanuel; Kimberly Hyacinthe
Entry standard – 23.20	3	Germany	Nadine Gonska; Lisa Mayer; Gina Lückenkemper
Entry standard – 23.20	3	Jamaica	Veronica Campbell Brown; Kali Davis-White; Simone Facey; Elaine Thompson *including alternates
Entry standard – 23.20	3	Trinidad and Tobago	Michelle-Lee Ahye; Semoy Hackett; Reyare Thomas
Entry standard – 23.20	3	Ukraine	Hrystyna Stuy; Nataliya Pohrebnyak; Viktoriya Pyatachenko
Entry standard – 23.20	3	United States	Tori Bowie; Jenna Prandini; Deajah Stevens
Entry standard – 23.20	2	Armenia	Gayane Chiloyan; Diana Khubeseryan
Entry standard – 23.20	2	Cyprus	Eleni Artymata; Ramona Papaioannou
Entry standard – 23.20	2	Great Britain	Dina Asher-Smith; Jodie Williams
Entry standard – 23.20	2	Italy	Libania Grenot; Gloria Hooper
Entry standard – 23.20	2	Ivory Coast	Murielle Ahouré; Marie-Josée Ta Lou
Entry standard – 23.20	2	Netherlands	Tessa van Schagen; Dafne Schippers
Entry standard – 23.20	2	Slovenia	Maja Mihalinec; Sabina Veit
Entry standard – 23.20	2	South Africa	Alyssa Conley; Justine Palframan
Entry standard – 23.20	1	Australia	Ella Nelson
Entry standard – 23.20	1	Bahrain	Salwa Eid Naser
Entry standard – 23.20	1	Barbados	Sada Williams
Entry standard – 23.20	1	Belgium	Cynthia Bolingo
Entry standard – 23.20	1	British Virgin Islands	Ashley Kelly
Entry standard – 23.20	1	Bulgaria	Ivet Lalova
Entry standard – 23.20	1	Chile	Isidora Jiménez
Entry standard – 23.20	1	Cuba	Arialis Gandulla
Entry standard – 23.20	1	Ecuador	Ángela Tenorio
Entry standard – 23.20	1	The Gambia	Gina Bass
Entry standard – 23.20	1	Greece	Maria Belibasaki
Entry standard – 23.20	1	Guyana	Brenessa Thompson
Entry standard – 23.20	1	India	Srabani Nanda
Entry standard – 23.20	1	Japan	Chisato Fukushima
Entry standard – 23.20	1	Kazakhstan	Viktoriya Zyabkina
Entry standard – 23.20	1	Nigeria	Blessing Okagbare
Entry standard – 23.20	1	Poland	Anna Kiełbasińska
Entry standard – 23.20	1	Portugal	Lorène Bazolo
Entry standard – 23.20	1	Puerto Rico	Celiangeli Morales
Entry standard – 23.20	1	Saint Kitts and Nevis	Tameka Williams
Entry standard – 23.20	1	Spain	Estela García
Entry standard – 23.20	1	Switzerland	Mujinga Kambundji
Entry standard – 23.20	1	Venezuela	Nercelis Soto
Entry standard – 23.20	1	Zambia	Kabange Mupopo
Invitational places			
Universality places	1	Cape Verde	Lidiane Lopes
Universality places	1	Maldives	Afa Ismail
Universality places	1	South Sudan	Margret Rumat Rumar Hassan
Total	68		

As of 26 June 2016

==== Women's 400 m ====
Qualification standard	No. of athletes	NOC	Nominated athletes
Entry standard – 52.20	3	Canada	Alicia Brown; Kendra Clarke; Carline Muir
Entry standard – 52.20	3	Great Britain	Seren Bundy-Davies; Emily Diamond; Christine Ohuruogu
Entry standard – 52.20	3	Jamaica	Stephenie Ann McPherson; Christine Day; Shericka Jackson
Entry standard – 52.20	3	Nigeria	Regina George; Patience Okon George; Tosin Adeloye
Entry standard – 52.20	3	Poland	Małgorzata Hołub; Justyna Święty; Patrycja Wyciszkiewicz
Entry standard – 52.20	3	South Africa	Justine Palframan; Caster Semenya; Tsholofelo Thipe
Entry standard – 52.20	3	United States	Allyson Felix; Phyllis Francis; Natasha Hastings
Entry standard – 52.20	2	Australia	Morgan Mitchell; Anneliese Rubie
Entry standard – 52.20	2	Botswana	Christine Botlogetswe; Lydia Jele
Entry standard – 52.20	2	Brazil	Geisa Coutinho; Jailma de Lima
Entry standard – 52.20	2	France	Floria Gueï
Entry standard – 52.20	2	Italy	Libania Grenot; Maria Benedicta Chigbolu
Entry standard – 52.20	2	Kenya	Margaret Nyairera Wambui; Maureen Jelagat Maiyo
Entry standard – 52.20	2	Ukraine	Olha Zemlyak; Nataliya Pyhyda
Entry standard – 52.20	1	Bahamas	Shaunae Miller
Entry standard – 52.20	1	Bahrain	Kemi Adekoya
Entry standard – 52.20	1	Barbados	Sada Williams
Entry standard – 52.20	1	China	Yang Huizhen
Entry standard – 52.20	1	Cuba	Lisneidy Veitia
Entry standard – 52.20	1	Germany	Ruth Sophia Spelmeyer
Entry standard – 52.20	1	Guyana	Aliyah Abrams
Entry standard – 52.20	1	India	Nirmala Sheoran
Entry standard – 52.20	1	Latvia	Gunta Latiševa-Čudare
Entry standard – 52.20	1	Namibia	Tjipekapora Herunga
Entry standard – 52.20	1	Portugal	Cátia Azevedo
Entry standard – 52.20	1	Romania	Bianca Răzor
Entry standard – 52.20	1	Saint Vincent and the Grenadines	Kineke Alexander
Entry standard – 52.20	1	Serbia	Tamara Salaški
Entry standard – 52.20	1	Slovakia	Iveta Putálová
Entry standard – 52.20	1	Spain	Aauri Bokesa
Entry standard – 52.20	1	Vietnam	Nguyễn Thị Huyền
Entry standard – 52.20	1	Zambia	Kabange Mupopo
Invitational places	1	Grenada	Kanika Beckles
Universality places	1	Kosovo	Vijona Kryeziu
Universality places	1	Mali	Djénébou Danté
Universality places	1	Niger	Mariama Mahamatou Itatou
Universality places	1	Pakistan	Najma Parveen
Universality places	1	Somalia	Maryan Nuh Muse
Total	60		

As of 2 July 2016

==== Women's 800 m ====
Qualification standard	No. of athletes	NOC	Nominated athletes
Entry standard – 2:01.50	3	Cuba	Rose Mary Almanza; Sahily Diago; Lisneidy Veitía
Entry standard – 2:01.50	3	Ethiopia	Habitam Alemu; Tigist Assefa; Gudaf Tsegay
Entry standard – 2:01.50	3	Jamaica	Simoya Campbell; Natoya Goule; Kenia Sinclair
Entry standard – 2:01.50	3	Kenya	Margaret Nyairera Wambui; Eunice Sum; Winnie Chebet
Entry standard – 2:01.50	3	Poland	Angelika Cichocka; Joanna Jóźwik; Sofia Ennaoui
Entry standard – 2:01.50	3	Ukraine	Nataliya Lupu; Anastasiya Tkachuk; Olha Lyakhova
Entry standard – 2:01.50	3	United States	Kate Grace; Ajeé Wilson; Chrishuna Williams
Entry standard – 2:01.50	2	France	Rénelle Lamote; Justine Fedronic
Entry standard – 2:01.50	2	Germany	Christina Hering; Fabienne Kohlmann
Entry standard – 2:01.50	2	Great Britain	Shelayna Oskan-Clarke; Lynsey Sharp
Entry standard – 2:01.50	2	Morocco	Malika Akkaoui; Rababe Arafi
Entry standard – 2:01.50	2	Romania	Florina Pierdevara; Claudia Bobocea
Entry standard – 2:01.50	1	Australia	Selma Kajan
Entry standard – 2:01.50	1	Belarus	Maryna Arzamasova
Entry standard – 2:01.50	1	Belgium	Renée Eykens
Entry standard – 2:01.50	1	Benin	Noélie Yarigo
Entry standard – 2:01.50	1	Brazil	Flávia de Lima
Entry standard – 2:01.50	1	Burundi	Francine Niyonsaba
Entry standard – 2:01.50	1	Canada	Melissa Bishop
Entry standard – 2:01.50	1	China	Wang Chunyu
Entry standard – 2:01.50	1	Iceland	Aníta Hinriksdóttir
Entry standard – 2:01.50	1	India	Tintu Lukka
Entry standard – 2:01.50	1	Ireland	Ciara Everard
Entry standard – 2:01.50	1	Italy	Yusneysi Santiusti
Entry standard – 2:01.50	1	Lithuania	Eglė Balčiūnaitė
Entry standard – 2:01.50	1	Luxembourg	Charline Mathias
Entry standard – 2:01.50	1	Netherlands	Sifan Hassan
Entry standard – 2:01.50	1	New Zealand	Angie Petty
Entry standard – 2:01.50	1	Serbia	Amela Terzić
Entry standard – 2:01.50	1	Slovakia	Lucia Klocová
Entry standard – 2:01.50	1	South Africa	Caster Semenya
Entry standard – 2:01.50	1	Spain	Esther Guerrero
Entry standard – 2:01.50	1	Sweden	Abeba Aregawi
Entry standard – 2:01.50	1	Switzerland	Selina Büchel
Entry standard – 2:01.50	1	Uganda	Docus Ajok
Entry standard – 2:01.50	1	Uruguay	Déborah Rodríguez
Invitational places	1	Refugee Olympic Team	Rose Lokonyen
	1	Independent Olympic Athletes	Yuliya Stepanova
Universality places	1	Central African Republic	Elisabeth Mandaba
Universality places	1	Mauritania	Houleye Ba
Universality places	1	Myanmar	Swe Li Myint
Total	57		

As of 10 June 2016

==== Women's 1500 m ====
Qualification standard	No. of athletes	NOC	Nominated athletes
Entry standard – 4:07.00	3	Australia	Jenny Blundell; Zoe Buckman; Linden Hall
Entry standard – 4:07.00	3	Canada	Nicole Sifuentes; Gabriela Stafford; Hilary Stellingwerff
Entry standard – 4:07.00	3	Ethiopia	Genzebe Dibaba; Besu Sado; Dawit Seyaum (Gudaf Tsegay)
Entry standard – 4:07.00	3	Germany	Konstanze Klosterhalfen; Maren Kock; Diana Sujew
Entry standard – 4:07.00	3	Kenya	Faith Chepngetich Kipyegon; Nancy Chepkwemoi; Violah Lagat
Entry standard – 4:07.00	3	Morocco	Rababe Arafi; Malika Akkaoui; Siham Hilali
Entry standard – 4:07.00	3	Poland	Sofia Ennaoui; Angelika Cichocka; Danuta Urbanik
Entry standard – 4:07.00	3	United States	Jennifer Simpson; Shannon Rowbury; Brenda Martinez
Entry standard – 4:07.00	2	Bahrain	Mimi Belete; Tigist Gashaw
Entry standard – 4:07.00	2	Great Britain	Laura Muir; Laura Weightman
Entry standard – 4:07.00	2	Netherlands	Sifan Hassan; Maureen Koster
Entry standard – 4:07.00	2	Sweden	Abeba Aregawi; Meraf Bahta
Entry standard – 4:07.00	1	Albania	Luiza Gega
Entry standard – 4:07.00	1	Colombia	Muriel Coneo
Entry standard – 4:07.00	1	Ireland	Ciara Mageean
Entry standard – 4:07.00	1	Italy	Margherita Magnani
Entry standard – 4:07.00	1	Jamaica	Aisha Praught
Entry standard – 4:07.00	1	New Zealand	Nikki Hamblin
Entry standard – 4:07.00	1	Portugal	Marta Pen
Entry standard – 4:07.00	1	Serbia	Amela Terzić
Entry standard – 4:07.00	1	Ukraine	Natalia Pryshchepa
Entry standard – 4:07.00	1	United Arab Emirates	Betlhem Desalegn
Invitational places	1	Refugee Olympic Team	Anjelina Lohalith
Universality places	1	Nepal	Saraswati Bhattarai
Universality places	1	São Tomé and Príncipe	Celma Bonfim da Graça
Total	42		

As of 10 June 2016

==== Women's 5000 m ====
Qualification standard	No. of athletes	NOC	Nominated athletes
Entry standard – 15:24.00	3	Australia	Madeline Hills; Genevieve LaCaze; Eloise Wellings
Entry standard – 15:24.00	3	Ethiopia	Almaz Ayana; Senbere Teferi; Ababel Yeshaneh (Tirunesh Dibaba)
Entry standard – 15:24.00	3	Great Britain	Eilish McColgan; Steph Twell; Laura Whittle
Entry standard – 15:24.00	3	Japan	Misaki Onishi; Ayuko Suzuki; Miyuki Uehara
Entry standard – 15:24.00	3	Kenya	Vivian Cheruiyot; Hellen Obiri; Mercy Cherono
Entry standard – 15:24.00	3	United States	Kim Conley; Shelby Houlihan; Molly Huddle
Entry standard – 15:24.00	2	Canada	Jessica O'Connell; Andrea Seccafien
Entry standard – 15:24.00	2	Netherlands	Maureen Koster; Susan Kuijken
Entry standard – 15:24.00	2	Sweden	Meraf Bahta; Sarah Lahti
Entry standard – 15:24.00	2	Turkey	Yasemin Can; Meryem Akda
Entry standard – 15:24.00	2	Uganda	Juliet Chekwel; Stella Chesang
Entry standard – 15:24.00	1	Austria	Jennifer Wenth
Entry standard – 15:24.00	1	Bahrain	Mimi Belete
Entry standard – 15:24.00	1	Belgium	Louise Carton
Entry standard – 15:24.00	1	Italy	Veronica Inglese
Entry standard – 15:24.00	1	New Zealand	Nikki Hamblin
Entry standard – 15:24.00	1	Norway	Karoline Bjerkeli Grøvdal
Entry standard – 15:24.00	1	Saudi Arabia	Tariq Ahmed Al-Amri
Invitational places			
Universality places	1	Solomon Islands	Sharon Firisua
Total	32		

As of 10 June 2016

==== Women's 10,000 m ====
Qualification standard	No. of athletes	NOC	Nominated athletes
Entry standard – 32:15.00	3	Ethiopia	Almaz Ayana; Gelete Burka; Tirunesh Dibaba (Netsanet Gudeta)
Entry standard – 32:15.00	3	Great Britain	Jess Andrews; Beth Potter; Jo Pavey
Entry standard – 32:15.00	3	Japan	Hanami Sekine; Ayuko Suzuki; Yuka Takashima
Entry standard – 32:15.00	3	Portugal	Ana Dulce Félix; Sara Moreira; Carla Salomé Rocha
Entry standard – 32:15.00	3	United States	Molly Huddle; Emily Infeld; Marielle Hall
Entry standard – 32:15.00	2	Canada	Natasha Wodak; Lanni Marchant
Entry standard – 32:15.00	2	Kenya	Vivian Cheruiyot; Betsy Saina
Entry standard – 32:15.00	2	Netherlands	Susan Kuijken; Jip Vastenburg
Entry standard – 32:15.00	1	Australia	Eloise Wellings
Entry standard – 32:15.00	1	Brazil	Tatiele de Carvalho
Entry standard – 32:15.00	1	Burundi	Diane Nukuri
Entry standard – 32:15.00	1	Finland	Johanna Peiponen
Entry standard – 32:15.00	1	Greece	Alexia Pappas
Entry standard – 32:15.00	1	Ireland	Fionnuala McCormack
Entry standard – 32:15.00	1	Italy	Veronica Inglese
Entry standard – 32:15.00	1	Kyrgyzstan	Daria Maslova
Entry standard – 32:15.00	1	Mexico	Brenda Flores
Entry standard – 32:15.00	1	Peru	Inés Melchor
Entry standard – 32:15.00	1	South Africa	Dominique Scott
Entry standard – 32:15.00	1	Spain	Trihas Gebre
Entry standard – 32:15.00	1	Sweden	Sarah Lahti
Entry standard – 32:15.00	1	Turkey	Yasemin Can
Entry standard – 32:15.00	1	Uganda	Juliet Chekwel
Entry standard – 32:15.00	1	Ukraine	Olga Skrypak
Entry standard – 32:15.00	1	United Arab Emirates	Alia Saeed Mohammed
Entry standard – 32:15.00	1	Uzbekistan	Sitora Hamidova
Invitational places			
Universality places			
Total	40		

As of 10 June 2016

==== Women's 100 m hurdles ====
Qualification standard	No. of athletes	NOC	Nominated athletes
Entry standard – 13.00	3	Bahamas	Devynne Charlton; Adanaca Brown; Ivanique Kemp
Entry standard – 13.00	3	Canada	Phylicia George; Nikkita Holder; Angela Whyte
Entry standard – 13.00	3	Germany	Pamela Dutkiewicz; Nadine Hildebrand; Cindy Roleder
Entry standard – 13.00	3	Jamaica	Monique Morgan; Shermaine Williams; Nickiesha Wilson; Megan Simmonds *including alternates
Entry standard – 13.00	3	United States	Nia Ali; Kristi Castlin; Brianna Rollins
Entry standard – 13.00	2	Barbados	Kierre Beckles; Akela Jones
Entry standard – 13.00	2	Brazil	Maíla Machado; Fabiana Moraes
Entry standard – 13.00	2	Colombia	Lina Flórez; Brigitte Merlano
Entry standard – 13.00	2	France	Cindy Billaud; Sandra Gomis
Entry standard – 13.00	2	Great Britain	Cindy Ofili; Tiffany Porter
Entry standard – 13.00	2	Ukraine	Anastasiya Mokhnyuk; Hanna Platitsyna
Entry standard – 13.00	1	Australia	Michelle Jenneke
Entry standard – 13.00	1	Austria	Beate Schrott
Entry standard – 13.00	1	Belarus	Alina Talay
Entry standard – 13.00	1	Belgium	Anne Zagré
Entry standard – 13.00	1	China	Wu Shuijiao
Entry standard – 13.00	1	Croatia	Andrea Ivančević
Entry standard – 13.00	1	Nigeria	Tobi Amusan
Entry standard – 13.00	1	Norway	Isabelle Pedersen
Entry standard – 13.00	1	Panama	Yvette Lewis
Entry standard – 13.00	1	Poland	Karolina Kołeczek
Entry standard – 13.00	1	Puerto Rico	Jasmine Quinn
Entry standard – 13.00	1	Spain	Caridad Jerez
Entry standard – 13.00	1	Switzerland	Noemi Zbären
Invitational places			
Universality places	1	Belize	Katy Sealy
Universality places	1	Burkina Faso	Marthe Koala
Universality places	1	Equatorial Guinea	Reïna-Flor Okori
Total	44		

As of 10 June 2016

==== Women's 400 m hurdles ====
Qualification standard	No. of athletes	NOC	Nominated athletes
Entry standard – 56.20	3	Canada	Noelle Montcalm; Sage Watson; Chanice Chase
Entry standard – 56.20	3	Great Britain	Eilidh Doyle
Entry standard – 56.20	3	Italy	Yadisleidy Pedroso; Marzia Caravelli; Ayomide Folorunso
Entry standard – 56.20	3	Jamaica	Ristananna Tracey; Leah Nugent; Janieve Russell; Kaliese Spencer *including alternates
Entry standard – 56.20	3	United States	Sydney McLaughlin; Dalilah Muhammad; Ashley Spencer
Entry standard – 56.20	2	Armenia	Lilit Harutyunyan
Entry standard – 56.20	2	Czech Republic	Zuzana Hejnová; Denisa Rosolová
Entry standard – 56.20	2	Denmark	Sara Petersen; Stina Troest
Entry standard – 56.20	2	Switzerland	Léa Sprunger; Petra Fontanive
Entry standard – 56.20	2	Trinidad and Tobago	Janeil Bellille; Sparkle McKnight
Entry standard – 56.20	2	Ukraine	Hanna Titimets; Hanna Ryzhykova
Entry standard – 56.20	2	Poland	Emilia Ankiewicz; Joanna Linkiewicz
Entry standard – 56.20	1	Australia	Lauren Wells
Entry standard – 56.20	1	Bahrain	Adekoya Oluwakemi
Entry standard – 56.20	1	Barbados	Tia-Adana Belle
Entry standard – 56.20	1	Belgium	Axelle Dauwens
Entry standard – 56.20	1	Cuba	Zurian Hechavarria
Entry standard – 56.20	1	France	Phara Anacharsis
Entry standard – 56.20	1	Germany	Jackie Baumann
Entry standard – 56.20	1	Lithuania	Eglė Staišiūnaitė
Entry standard – 56.20	1	Morocco	Hayat Lambarki
Entry standard – 56.20	1	Nigeria	Amaka Ogoegbunam
Entry standard – 56.20	1	Portugal	Vera Barbosa
Entry standard – 56.20	1	Puerto Rico	Grace Claxton
Entry standard – 56.20	1	South Africa	Wenda Nel
Entry standard – 56.20	1	Sweden	Elise Malmberg
Entry standard – 56.20	1	Vietnam	Nguyễn Thị Huyền
Invitational places	1	Costa Rica	Sharolyn Scott
Universality places			
Total	44		

As of 10 June 2016

==== Women's 3000 m steeplechase ====
Qualification standard	No. of athletes	NOC	Nominated athletes
Entry standard – 9.45.00	3	Australia	Madeline Heiner; Genevieve LaCaze; Victoria Mitchell
Entry standard – 9.45.00	3	Canada	Maria Bernard; Geneviève Lalonde; Erin Teschuk
Entry standard – 9.45.00	3	Ethiopia	Sofia Assefa; Hiwot Ayalew; Etenesh Diro (Weynshet Ansa)
Entry standard – 9.45.00	3	Germany	Gesa Felicitas Krause; Sanaa Koubaa; Maya Rehberg
Entry standard – 9.45.00	3	Ireland	Sara Treacy; Michelle Finn; Kerry O'Flaherty
Entry standard – 9.45.00	3	Kenya	Hyvin Kiyeng; Beatrice Chepkoech; Lydia Rotich
Entry standard – 9.45.00	3	Turkey	Tuğba Güvenç; Özlem Kaya; Meryem Akda
Entry standard – 9.45.00	3	United States	Emma Coburn; Courtney Frerichs; Colleen Quigley
Entry standard – 9.45.00	2	China	Li Zhenzhu; Zhang Xinyan
Entry standard – 9.45.00	2	India	Lalita Babar; Sudha Singh
Entry standard – 9.45.00	2	Morocco	Salima Elouali Alami; Fadwa Sidi Madane
Entry standard – 9.45.00	2	Sweden	Klara Bodinson; Charlotta Fougberg
Entry standard – 9.45.00	1	Algeria	Amina Bettiche
Entry standard – 9.45.00	1	Argentina	Belén Casetta
Entry standard – 9.45.00	1	Bahrain	Ruth Jebet
Entry standard – 9.45.00	1	Belarus	Sviatlana Kudzelich
Entry standard – 9.45.00	1	Brazil	Juliana Paula dos Santos
Entry standard – 9.45.00	1	Bulgaria	Silvia Danekova
Entry standard – 9.45.00	1	Colombia	Muriel Coneo
Entry standard – 9.45.00	1	Czech Republic	Lucie Sekanová
Entry standard – 9.45.00	1	Finland	Sandra Eriksson
Entry standard – 9.45.00	1	Great Britain	Lennie Waite
Entry standard – 9.45.00	1	Jamaica	Aisha Praught
Entry standard – 9.45.00	1	Poland	Matylda Kowal
Entry standard – 9.45.00	1	Romania	Ancuța Bobocel
Entry standard – 9.45.00	1	Slovenia	Maruša Mišmaš
Entry standard – 9.45.00	1	Spain	Diana Martín
Entry standard – 9.45.00	1	Switzerland	Fabienne Schlumpf
Entry standard – 9.45.00	1	Tunisia	Habiba Ghribi
Entry standard – 9.45.00	1	Uganda	Peruth Chemutai
Entry standard – 9.45.00	1	Ukraine	Mariya Shatalova
Invitational places	1	Madagascar	Eliane Saholinirina
Universality places			
Total	59		

As of 10 June 2016

== Road events ==
=== Men's road events ===
==== Men's marathon ====
Qualifying for the Kenyan marathon team is the most competitive. 427 Kenyan men achieved the qualification standard.

Qualification standard	No. of athletes	NOC	Nominated athletes
Entry standard – 2:19:00	3	Algeria	Hakim Saadi; Haim Saadi; El Hadi Lameche
Entry standard – 2:19:00	3	Argentina	Federico Bruno; Mariano Mastromarino; Luis Molina
Entry standard – 2:19:00	3	Australia	Liam Adams; Scott Westcott; Michael Shelley
Entry standard – 2:19:00	3	Belgium	
Entry standard – 2:19:00	3	Brazil	Marílson Gomes dos Santos; Paulo Roberto Paula; Solonei Rocha da Silva
Entry standard – 2:19:00	3	Chile	Victor Aravena; Daniel Estrada; Enzo Yáñez
Entry standard – 2:19:00	3	China	Dong Guojian; Duo Bujie; Zhu Renxue
Entry standard – 2:19:00	3	Colombia	Diego Colorado; Gerard Giraldo; Andrés Ruiz
Entry standard – 2:19:00	3	Denmark	Abdi Hakim Ulad
Entry standard – 2:19:00	3	Ecuador	Miguel Ángel Almachi; Segundo Jami; Byron Piedra
Entry standard – 2:19:00	3	Eritrea	
Entry standard – 2:19:00	3	Ethiopia	Tesfaye Abera; Lemi Berhanu; Feyisa Lelisa (Lelisa Desisa)
Entry standard – 2:19:00	3	Germany	Arne Gabius; Hendrik Pfeiffer; Philipp Pflieger
Entry standard – 2:19:00	3	Great Britain	Callum Hawkins; Derek Hawkins; Tsegai Tewelde
Entry standard – 2:19:00	3	India	Nitender Singh Rawat; Thonakal Gopi; Kheta Ram
Entry standard – 2:19:00	3	Ireland	Kevin Seaward; Mick Clohisey; Paul Pollock
Entry standard – 2:19:00	3	Israel	Tesama Moogas; Marhu Teferi; Ageze Guadie
Entry standard – 2:19:00	3	Italy	Ruggero Pertile; Daniele Meucci; Stefano La Rosa
Entry standard – 2:19:00	3	Japan	Suehiro Ishikawa; Hisanori Kitajima; Satoru Sasaki
Entry standard – 2:19:00	3	Kenya	Eliud Kipchoge; Stanley Biwott; Wesley Korir
Entry standard – 2:19:00	3	Mongolia	
Entry standard – 2:19:00	3	North Korea	
Entry standard – 2:19:00	3	Peru	Willy Canchanya; Raúl Machacuay; Raúl Pacheco
Entry standard – 2:19:00	3	Poland	Artur Kozłowski; Yared Shegumo; Henryk Szost
Entry standard – 2:19:00	3	South Africa	Lusapho April; Lungile Gongqa; Sibusiso Nzima
Entry standard – 2:19:00	3	South Korea	
Entry standard – 2:19:00	3	Spain	Carles Castillejo; Jesús España; Javier Guerra
Entry standard – 2:19:00	3	Tanzania	Mohamed Ikoki Msandeki; Saidi Makula; Alphonce Felix Simbu
Entry standard – 2:19:00	3	Turkey	Bekir Karayel; Serkan Kaya; Ercan Muslu
Entry standard – 2:19:00	3	Uganda	
Entry standard – 2:19:00	3	Ukraine	Oleksandr Sitkovskyy; Ihor Olefirenko; Serhiy Lebid
Entry standard – 2:19:00	3	United States	Galen Rupp; Meb Keflezighi; Jared Ward
Entry standard – 2:19:00	3	Uruguay	Martín Cuestas; Nicolás Cuestas; Aguelmis Rojas
Entry standard – 2:19:00	3	Zimbabwe	Wirimai Juwawo; Pardon Ndhlovu; Cuthbert Nyasango
Entry standard – 2:19:00	2	Belarus	Vladislav Pryamov; Stsiapan Rahautsou
Entry standard – 2:19:00	2	Burundi	Pierre-Célestin Nihorimbere; Abraham Niyonkuru
Entry standard – 2:19:00	2	Canada	Reid Coolsaet; Eric Gillis
Entry standard – 2:19:00	2	Estonia	Roman Fosti; Tiidrek Nurme
Entry standard – 2:19:00	2	Greece	Michalis Kalomiris; Christoforos Merousis
Entry standard – 2:19:00	2	Hungary	Gáspár Csere; Gábor Józsa
Entry standard – 2:19:00	2	Lithuania	Remigijus Kančys; Valdas Dopolskas
Entry standard – 2:19:00	2	Morocco	Abdelmajid El Hissouf; Rachid Kisri
Entry standard – 2:19:00	2	Norway	Sondre Nordstad Moen; Asbjorn Ellefsen Persen
Entry standard – 2:19:00	2	Portugal	Ricardo Ribas; Rui Pedro Silva
Entry standard – 2:19:00	2	Romania	Marius Ionescu; Nicolae Soare
Entry standard – 2:19:00	2	Sweden	Mikael Ekvall; David Nilsson
Entry standard – 2:19:00	2	Switzerland	Tadesse Abraham; Christian Kreienbühl
Entry standard – 2:19:00	1	Bahrain	Alemu Bekele
Entry standard – 2:19:00	1	Cambodia	Neko Hiroshi
Entry standard – 2:19:00	1	Cuba	Richer Pérez
Entry standard – 2:19:00	1	Djibouti	Mumin Gala
Entry standard – 2:19:00	1	Georgia	Daviti Kharazishvili
Entry standard – 2:19:00	1	Guatemala	José Amado García
Entry standard – 2:19:00	1	Iran	Mohammad Jafar Moradi
Entry standard – 2:19:00	1	Jordan	Hamad Marouf
Entry standard – 2:19:00	1	Kazakhstan	
Entry standard – 2:19:00	1	Latvia	Valērijs Žolnerovičs
Entry standard – 2:19:00	1	Lesotho	
Entry standard – 2:19:00	1	Mauritius	David Carver
Entry standard – 2:19:00	1	Mexico	Ricardo Ramos
Entry standard – 2:19:00	1	Moldova	Roman Prodius
Entry standard – 2:19:00	1	Namibia	Mynhardt Kawanivi
Entry standard – 2:19:00	1	Netherlands	Abdi Nageeye
Entry standard – 2:19:00	1	Panama	Jorge Castelblanco
Entry standard – 2:19:00	1	Paraguay	Derlys Ayala
Entry standard – 2:19:00	1	Qatar	Essa Ismail Rashed
Entry standard – 2:19:00	1	Rwanda	Ambroise Uwiragyie
Entry standard – 2:19:00	1	Slovenia	Tone Kosmač
Entry standard – 2:19:00	1	Sri Lanka	Anuradha Cooray
Entry standard – 2:19:00	1	Chinese Taipei	Ho Chin-Ping
Entry standard – 2:19:00	1	Tunisia	Abdulaziz Charfi
Entry standard – 2:19:00	1	Uzbekistan	Andrey Petrov
Entry standard – 2:19:00	1	Venezuela	Luis Orta
Universality places	1	Democratic Republic of the Congo	Makorobondo Salukombo
Universality places	1	Refugee Olympic Team	Yonas Kinde
Universality places	1	Kyrgyzstan	Ilya Tyapkin
Universality places	1	South Sudan	Guor Marial
Total	162		

As of 10 June 2016

==== Men's 20 km walk ====
Qualification standard	No. of athletes	NOC	Nominated athletes
Entry standard – 1:24:00	3	Australia	Dane Bird-Smith; Rhydian Cowley; Jared Tallent
Entry standard – 1:24:00	3	Belarus	Dzianis Simanovich; Aliaksandr Liakhovich; Yauheni Zalesski
Entry standard – 1:24:00	3	Brazil	José Alessandro Bagio; Caio Bonfim; Moacir Zimmermann
Entry standard – 1:24:00	3	Canada	Inaki Gomez; Benjamin Thorne; Evan Dunfee
Entry standard – 1:24:00	3	China	Chen Ding; Cai Zelin; Wang Zhen
Entry standard – 1:24:00	3	Colombia	Éider Arévalo; Manuel Esteban Soto; Luis Fernando López
Entry standard – 1:24:00	3	Ecuador	Mauricio Arteaga; Andrés Chocho; Brian Pintado
Entry standard – 1:24:00	3	Germany	Nils Brembach; Christopher Linke; Hagen Pohle
Entry standard – 1:24:00	3	Guatemala	Erick Barrondo; Mario Bran; José Raymundo
Entry standard – 1:24:00	3	India	Gurmeet Singh; Irfan Kolothum Thodi; Baljinder Singh
Entry standard – 1:24:00	3	Italy	Matteo Giupponi
Entry standard – 1:24:00	3	Japan	Eiki Takahashi; Isamu Fujisawa; Daisuke Matsunaga
Entry standard – 1:24:00	3	Mexico	Pedro Daniel Gómez; Julio César Salazar; Ever Palma
Entry standard – 1:24:00	3	South Korea	
Entry standard – 1:24:00	3	Poland	Artur Brzozowski; Jakub Jelonek; Łukasz Nowak
Entry standard – 1:24:00	3	Spain	Francisco Arcilla; Miguel Ángel López; Álvaro Martín
Entry standard – 1:24:00	3	Ukraine	Ruslan Dmytrenko; Ihor Hlavan; Nazar Kovalenko
Entry standard – 1:24:00	2	Ireland	Rob Heffernan; Alex Wright
Entry standard – 1:24:00	2	Kazakhstan	Georgiy Sheiko; Vitaliy Anichkin
Entry standard – 1:24:00	2	Kenya	Samuel Gathimba; Simon Wachira
Entry standard – 1:24:00	2	Lithuania	Marius Šavelskis; Marius Žiūkas
Entry standard – 1:24:00	2	Norway	Håvard Haukenes; Erik Tysse
Entry standard – 1:24:00	2	Portugal	João Vieira; Sérgio Vieira
Entry standard – 1:24:00	2	Slovakia	Matej Tóth; Anton Kučmín
Entry standard – 1:24:00	2	South Africa	Lebogang Shange; Wayne Snyman
Entry standard – 1:24:00	2	Sweden	Perséus Karlström; Anatole Ibáñez
Entry standard – 1:24:00	2	Turkey	Mert Atlı; Ersin Tacir
Entry standard – 1:24:00	1	Argentina	Juan Manuel Cano
Entry standard – 1:24:00	1	Bolivia	Marco Antonio Rodríguez
Entry standard – 1:24:00	1	Chile	Yerko Araya
Entry standard – 1:24:00	1	France	Kévin Campion
Entry standard – 1:24:00	1	Great Britain	Tom Bosworth
Entry standard – 1:24:00	1	Greece	Alexandros Papamichail
Entry standard – 1:24:00	1	Hungary	Máté Helebrandt
Entry standard – 1:24:00	1	Iran	Hamid Reza Zouravand
Entry standard – 1:24:00	1	New Zealand	Quentin Rew
Entry standard – 1:24:00	1	Peru	Pavel Chihuán
Entry standard – 1:24:00	1	Tunisia	Hassanine Sebei
Entry standard – 1:24:00	1	Venezuela	Richard Vargas
Entry standard – 1:24:00	1	Vietnam	Nguyễn Thành Ngưng
Universality places			
Total	86		

As of 10 June 2016

==== Men's 50 km walk ====
Qualification standard	No. of athletes	NOC	Nominated athletes
Entry standard – 4:06:00	3	Australia	Chris Erickson; Jared Tallent; Brendon Reading
Entry standard – 4:06:00	3	Brazil	Jonathan Riekmann; Mário José dos Santos Junior; Caio Bonfim
Entry standard – 4:06:00	3	China	Wang Zhendong; Han Yucheng; Yu Wei
Entry standard – 4:06:00	3	Colombia	James Rendón; José Leonardo Montaña; Jorge Armando Ruiz
Entry standard – 4:06:00	3	Ecuador	Jonathan Cáceres; Andrés Chocho; Claudio Villanueva
Entry standard – 4:06:00	3	Finland	Aku Partanen; Aleksi Ojala; Jarkko Kinnunen
Entry standard – 4:06:00	3	Guatemala	Erick Barrondo; Jaime Quiyuch; Luis Ángel Sánchez
Entry standard – 4:06:00	3	Hungary	Máté Helebrandt; Sándor Rácz; Miklós Srp
Entry standard – 4:06:00	3	Ireland	Alex Wright; Rob Heffernan; Brendan Boyce
Entry standard – 4:06:00	3	Italy	Matteo Giupponi; Marco De Luca; Teodorico Caporaso
Entry standard – 4:06:00	3	Japan	Takayuki Tanii; Kōichirō Morioka; Hirooki Arai
Entry standard – 4:06:00	3	Mexico	
Entry standard – 4:06:00	3	Poland	Rafał Augustyn; Adrian Błocki; Rafał Fedaczyński
Entry standard – 4:06:00	3	Portugal	Miguel Carvalho; João Vieira; Pedro Isidro
Entry standard – 4:06:00	3	Serbia	Nenad Filipović; Predrag Filipović; Vladimir Savanović
Entry standard – 4:06:00	3	Slovakia	Matej Tóth; Martin Tišťan; Dušan Majdán
Entry standard – 4:06:00	3	Spain	José Ignacio Díaz; Jesús Ángel García; Miguel Ángel López
Entry standard – 4:06:00	3	Ukraine	Ivan Banzeruk; Serhiy Budza; Ihor Saharuk
Entry standard – 4:06:00	2	Belarus	Ivan Trotski; Pavel Yarokhau
Entry standard – 4:06:00	2	Canada	Mathieu Bilodeau; Evan Dunfee
Entry standard – 4:06:00	2	Germany	Carl Dohmann; Hagen Pohle
Entry standard – 4:06:00	2	India	Sandeep Kumar; Manish Singh Rawat
Entry standard – 4:06:00	2	Lithuania	Tadas Šuškevičius; Arturas Mastianica
Entry standard – 4:06:00	2	Romania	Marius Cocioran; Narcis Mihăilă
Entry standard – 4:06:00	2	South Korea	
Entry standard – 4:06:00	1	Bolivia	Ronald Quispe
Entry standard – 4:06:00	1	Chile	Edward Araya
Entry standard – 4:06:00	1	Czech Republic	Lukáš Gdula
Entry standard – 4:06:00	1	El Salvador	Luis Menjivar
Entry standard – 4:06:00	1	France	Yohann Diniz
Entry standard – 4:06:00	1	Great Britain	Dominic King
Entry standard – 4:06:00	1	Greece	Alexandros Papamichail
Entry standard – 4:06:00	1	Latvia	Arnis Rumbenieks
Entry standard – 4:06:00	1	New Zealand	Quentin Rew
Entry standard – 4:06:00	1	Norway	Håvard Haukenes
Entry standard – 4:06:00	1	South Africa	Marc Mundell
Entry standard – 4:06:00	1	Sweden	Anders Hansson
Entry standard – 4:06:00	1	Switzerland	Alex Flórez
Entry standard – 4:06:00	1	United States	John Nunn
Entry standard – 4:06:00	1	Venezuela	Yereman Salazar
Universality places			
Total	84		

As of 10 June 2016

=== Women's road events ===
==== Women's marathon ====
Qualification standard	No. of athletes	NOC	Nominated athletes
Entry standard – 2:45:00	3	Algeria	Kenza Dahmani; Barkahoum Drici; Souad Aït Salem
Entry standard – 2:45:00	3	Argentina	Viviana Chávez; Rosa Godoy; María de los Ángeles Peralta
Entry standard – 2:45:00	3	Australia	Milly Clark; Jessica Trengove; Lisa Weightman
Entry standard – 2:45:00	3	Bahrain	
Entry standard – 2:45:00	3	Belarus	
Entry standard – 2:45:00	3	Belgium	
Entry standard – 2:45:00	3	Brazil	Adriana Aparecida dos Santos; Marily dos Santos; Graciete Santana
Entry standard – 2:45:00	3	China	Liu Ruihuan
Entry standard – 2:45:00	3	Colombia	Kellys Arias; Angie Orjuela; Erika Abril
Entry standard – 2:45:00	3	Denmark	Anna Holm Baumeister; Jessica Draskau-Petersson
Entry standard – 2:45:00	3	Ecuador	Maria Elena Calle; Rosa Chacha; Silvia Paredes
Entry standard – 2:45:00	3	Estonia	Leila Luik; Liina Luik; Lily Luik
Entry standard – 2:45:00	3	Ethiopia	Mare Dibaba; Tirfi Tsegaye; Tigist Tufa (Aberu Kebede)
Entry standard – 2:45:00	3	Germany	Anja Scherl; Lisa Hahner; Anna Hahner
Entry standard – 2:45:00	3	Greece	Ourania Rebouli; Sofia Riga; Panagiota Vlachaki
Entry standard – 2:45:00	3	Hungary	Zsófia Erdélyi; Krisztina Papp; Tünde Szabó
Entry standard – 2:45:00	3	India	O. P. Jaisha; Sudha Singh; Kavita Raut
Entry standard – 2:45:00	3	Ireland	Breege Connolly; Lizzie Lee; Fionnualla McCormack
Entry standard – 2:45:00	3	Italy	Valeria Straneo; Anna Incerti; Catherine Bertone
Entry standard – 2:45:00	3	Japan	Kayoko Fukushi; Mai Ito; Tomomi Tanaka
Entry standard – 2:45:00	3	Kenya	Jemima Sumgong; Helah Kiprop; Visiline Jepkesho
Entry standard – 2:45:00	3	Kyrgyzstan	Iuliia Andreeva; Mariya Korobitskaya; Viktoriia Poliudina
Entry standard – 2:45:00	3	Latvia	Jeļena Prokopčuka; Ilona Marhele; Ariana Hilborn
Entry standard – 2:45:00	3	Lithuania	Rasa Drazdauskaitė; Diana Lobačevskė; Vaida Žūsinaitė
Entry standard – 2:45:00	3	Mexico	Vianney de la Rosa; Margarita Hernández; Madaí Pérez
Entry standard – 2:45:00	3	Morocco	
Entry standard – 2:45:00	3	North Korea	
Entry standard – 2:45:00	3	Peru	Wilma Arizapana; Jovana de la Cruz; Inés Melchor
Entry standard – 2:45:00	3	Poland	Katarzyna Kowalska; Iwona Lewandowska; Monika Stefanowicz
Entry standard – 2:45:00	3	Portugal	Jéssica Augusto; Ana Dulce Félix; Sara Moreira
Entry standard – 2:45:00	3	South Africa	Christine Kalmer; Diana-Lebo Phalula; Irvette van Blerk
Entry standard – 2:45:00	3	South Korea	
Entry standard – 2:45:00	3	Spain	Alessandra Aguilar; Azucena Díaz; Estela Navascués
Entry standard – 2:45:00	3	Sweden	Isabellah Andersson; Annelie Johansson; Louise Wiker
Entry standard – 2:45:00	3	Chinese Taipei	Chen Yu-Hsuan; Hsieh Chien-Ho; Hsu Yu-Fang
Entry standard – 2:45:00	3	Turkey	Nilay Esen; Sultan Haydar; Meryem Erdoğan
Entry standard – 2:45:00	3	Ukraine	Olha Kotovska; Olena Burkovska; Tetyana Vernyhor
Entry standard – 2:45:00	3	United States	Amy Cragg; Desiree Linden; Shalane Flanagan
Entry standard – 2:45:00	2	Canada	Krista DuChene; Lanni Marchant
Entry standard – 2:45:00	2	Chile	Érika Olivera; Natalia Romero
Entry standard – 2:45:00	2	Croatia	Marija Vrajić Trošić; Matea Matošević
Entry standard – 2:45:00	2	Finland	Anne-Mari Hyryläinen
Entry standard – 2:45:00	2	Great Britain	Alyson Dixon; Sonia Samuels
Entry standard – 2:45:00	2	Israel	Lonah Chemtai Salpeter; Maor Tiyouri
Entry standard – 2:45:00	2	Kazakhstan	Gulzhanat Zhanatbek; Irina Smolnikova
Entry standard – 2:45:00	2	Mongolia	
Entry standard – 2:45:00	2	Namibia	Helalia Johannes; Beata Naigambo
Entry standard – 2:45:00	2	Romania	Daniela Carlan; Paula Todoran
Entry standard – 2:45:00	2	Serbia	Ana Subotić; Olivera Jevtić
Entry standard – 2:45:00	2	Switzerland	Martina Strähl; Patricia Morceli Bühler
Entry standard – 2:45:00	2	Uganda	Adero Nyakisi; Nancy Rotich
Entry standard – 2:45:00	2	Uzbekistan	Sitora Hamidova; Marina Khmelevskaya
Entry standard – 2:45:00	1	Austria	Andrea Mayr
Entry standard – 2:45:00	1	Bolivia	Rosmery Quispe
Entry standard – 2:45:00	1	Bosnia and Herzegovina	Lucija Kimani
Entry standard – 2:45:00	1	Bulgaria	Militsa Mircheva
Entry standard – 2:45:00	1	Burundi	Diane Nukuri
Entry standard – 2:45:00	1	Cuba	Dailín Belmonte
Entry standard – 2:45:00	1	Czech Republic	Eva Vrabcová-Nývltová
Entry standard – 2:45:00	1	France	Christelle Daunay
Entry standard – 2:45:00	1	Lebanon	Chirine Njeim
Entry standard – 2:45:00	1	Moldova	Lilia Fiscovici
Entry standard – 2:45:00	1	Montenegro	Slađana Perunović
Entry standard – 2:45:00	1	Netherlands	Andrea Deelstra
Entry standard – 2:45:00	1	Norway	Marthe Katrine Myhre
Entry standard – 2:45:00	1	Palestine	Mayada Al-Sayad
Entry standard – 2:45:00	1	Paraguay	Carmen Martínez
Entry standard – 2:45:00	1	Philippines	Mary Joy Tabal
Entry standard – 2:45:00	1	Puerto Rico	Beverly Ramos
Entry standard – 2:45:00	1	Rwanda	Claudette Mukasakindi
Entry standard – 2:45:00	1	Singapore	Neo Jie Shi
Entry standard – 2:45:00	1	Slovakia	Katarína Berešová
Entry standard – 2:45:00	1	Slovenia	Daneja Grandovec
Entry standard – 2:45:00	1	Sri Lanka	Niluka Geethani Rajasekara
Entry standard – 2:45:00	1	Tanzania	Sara Ramadhani
Entry standard – 2:45:00	1	Venezuela	Yolimar Pineda
Entry standard – 2:45:00	1	Zimbabwe	Rutendo Nyahora
Universality places	1	Cambodia	Nary Ly
Universality places	1	Malawi	Tereza Master
Universality places	1	Saudi Arabia	Sarah Attar
Total	171		

As of 10 June 2016

==== Women's 20 km walk ====
Qualification standard	No. of athletes	NOC	Nominated athletes
Entry standard – 1:36:00	3	Australia	Rachel Tallent; Regan Lamble; Tanya Holliday
Entry standard – 1:36:00	3	Belarus	
Entry standard – 1:36:00	3	Bolivia	Claudia Balderrama; Ángela Castro; Wendy Cornejo
Entry standard – 1:36:00	3	China	Liu Hong; Lu Xiuzhi; Qieyang Shenjie
Entry standard – 1:36:00	3	Colombia	Sandra Arenas; Sandra Galvis; Yeseida Carrillo
Entry standard – 1:36:00	3	Ecuador	Magaly Bonilla; Gabriela Cornejo; Paola Pérez
Entry standard – 1:36:00	3	Greece	Antigoni Drisbioti; Despina Zapounidou; Panayióta Tsinopoúlou
Entry standard – 1:36:00	3	Guatemala	Mayra Carolina Herrera; Mirna Ortiz; Maritza Poncio
Entry standard – 1:36:00	3	Hungary	Viktória Madarász; Barbara Kovács; Rita Récsei
Entry standard – 1:36:00	3	Italy	Eleonora Giorgi; Antonella Palmisano; Elisa Rigaudo
Entry standard – 1:36:00	3	Japan	Kumiko Okada
Entry standard – 1:36:00	3	Kazakhstan	
Entry standard – 1:36:00	3	Lithuania	Brigita Virbalytė-Dimšienė; Živilė Vaiciukevičiūtė; Neringa Aidietytė
Entry standard – 1:36:00	3	Mexico	María Guadalupe González; Alejandra Ortega; María Guadalupe Sánchez
Entry standard – 1:36:00	3	Poland	Paulina Buziak; Agnieszka Dygacz; Agnieszka Szwarnóg
Entry standard – 1:36:00	3	Portugal	Inês Henriques; Ana Cabecinha; Daniela Cardoso
Entry standard – 1:36:00	3	Romania	Claudia Ștef; Ana Veronica Rodean; Andreea Arsine
Entry standard – 1:36:00	3	South Korea	
Entry standard – 1:36:00	3	Spain	Raquel González; Beatriz Pascual; Julia Takacs
Entry standard – 1:36:00	3	Ukraine	Lyudmyla Olyanovska; Nadiya Borovska; Inna Kashyna
Entry standard – 1:36:00	2	Brazil	Érica de Sena; Cisiane Lopes
Entry standard – 1:36:00	2	Ethiopia	Yehualeye Beletew; Askale Tiksa
Entry standard – 1:36:00	2	India	Khushbir Kaur; Sapna Punia
Entry standard – 1:36:00	2	Peru	Kimberly García; Jessica Hancco
Entry standard – 1:36:00	2	Slovakia	Mária Czaková; Mária Gáliková
Entry standard – 1:36:00	2	United States	Maria Michta-Coffey; Miranda Melville
Entry standard – 1:36:00	1	Czech Republic	Anežka Drahotová
Entry standard – 1:36:00	1	France	Emilie Menuet
Entry standard – 1:36:00	1	Kenya	Grace Wanjiru
Entry standard – 1:36:00	1	Latvia	Agnese Pastare
Entry standard – 1:36:00	1	New Zealand	Alana Barber
Entry standard – 1:36:00	1	South Africa	Anél Oosthuizen
Entry standard – 1:36:00	1	Switzerland	Laura Polli
Entry standard – 1:36:00	1	Tunisia	Chahinez Nasri
Universality places	1	El Salvador	Yesenia Miranda
Total	83		

As of 10 June 2016

== Field events ==
=== Men's field events ===
==== Men's long jump ====
Qualification standard	No. of athletes	NOC	Nominated athletes
Entry standard – 8.15	3	China	Gao Xinglong; Li Jinzhe; Wang Jianan
Entry standard – 8.15	3	South Africa	Zarck Visser; Luvo Manyonga; Rushwahl Samaai
Entry standard – 8.15	3	United States	Jeff Henderson; Jarrion Lawson; Mike Hartfield
Entry standard – 8.15	2	Australia	Fabrice Lapierre; Henry Frayne
Entry standard – 8.15	2	Germany	Alyn Camara; Fabian Heinle
Entry standard – 8.15	2	Jamaica	Damar Forbes; Aubrey Smith
Entry standard – 8.15	1	Azerbaijan	Nazim Babayev
Entry standard – 8.15	1	Belarus	Kanstantsin Barycheuski
Entry standard – 8.15	1	Bermuda	Tyrone Smith
Entry standard – 8.15	1	Brazil	Higor Alves
Entry standard – 8.15	1	Cuba	Maykel Demetrio Massó
Entry standard – 8.15	1	Czech Republic	Radek Juška
Entry standard – 8.15	1	France	Kafétien Gomis
Entry standard – 8.15	1	Georgia	Bachana Khorava
Entry standard – 8.15	1	Great Britain	Greg Rutherford
Entry standard – 8.15	1	Greece	Miltos Tentoglou
Entry standard – 8.15	1	India	Ankit Sharma
Entry standard – 8.15	1	Iran	Mohammad Arzandeh
Entry standard – 8.15	1	South Korea	Kim Deok-hyeon
Entry standard – 8.15	1	Spain	Jean Marie Okutu
Entry standard – 8.15	1	Sweden	Michel Tornéus
Entry standard – 8.15	1	Uruguay	Emiliano Lasa
Invitational places			
Universality places	1	Albania	Izmir Smajlaj
Total	27		

As of 6 July 2016

==== Men's triple jump ====
Qualification standard	No. of athletes	NOC	Nominated athletes
Entry standard – 16.85	3	China	Dong Bin; Xu Xiaolong; Cao Shuo
Entry standard – 16.85	3	Cuba	Pedro Pablo Pichardo; Alexis Copello; Lázaro Martínez
Entry standard – 16.85	3	United States	Chris Benard; Will Claye; Christian Taylor
Entry standard – 16.85	2	Bahamas	Latario Collie-Minns; Leevan Sands
Entry standard – 16.85	2	Bulgaria	Georgi Tsonov; Rumen Dimitrov
Entry standard – 16.85	2	France	Benjamin Compaoré; Harold Correa
Entry standard – 16.85	2	Italy	Fabrizio Donato; Fabrizio Schembri
Entry standard – 16.85	1	Armenia	Levon Aghasyan
Entry standard – 16.85	1	Azerbaijan	Nazim Babayev
Entry standard – 16.85	1	Colombia	Jhon Murillo
Entry standard – 16.85	1	Dominica	Yordanis Duranona
Entry standard – 16.85	1	Georgia	Lasha Torgvaidze
Entry standard – 16.85	1	Germany	Max Heß
Entry standard – 16.85	1	Guyana	Troy Doris
Entry standard – 16.85	1	India	Renjith Maheshwary
Entry standard – 16.85	1	Jamaica	Clive Pullen
Entry standard – 16.85	1	Japan	Daigo Hasegawa
Entry standard – 16.85	1	Kazakhstan	Roman Valiyev
Entry standard – 16.85	1	Mauritius	Jonathan Drack
Entry standard – 16.85	1	Mexico	Alberto Álvarez
Entry standard – 16.85	1	Netherlands	Fabian Florant
Entry standard – 16.85	1	Nigeria	Tosin Oke
Entry standard – 16.85	1	Poland	Karol Hoffmann
Entry standard – 16.85	1	Portugal	Nelson Évora
Entry standard – 16.85	1	Romania	Marian Oprea
Entry standard – 16.85	1	South Africa	Godfrey Khotso Mokoena
Entry standard – 16.85	1	South Korea	Kim Deok-hyeon
Entry standard – 16.85	1	Turkey	Şeref Osmanoğlu
Entry standard – 16.85	1	Spain	Pablo Torrijos
Entry standard – 16.85	1	Ukraine	Viktor Kuznyetsov
Entry standard – 16.85	1	Virgin Islands	Muhammad Halim
Invitational places			
Universality places	1	Burkina Faso	Hugues Fabrice Zango
Universality places	1	Mali	Mamadou Chérif Dia
Total	43		

As of 11 July 2016

==== Men's high jump ====
Qualification standard	No. of athletes	NOC	Nominated athletes
Entry standard – 2.29	3	Bahamas	Donald Thomas; Trevor Barry; Jamal Wilson
Entry standard – 2.29	3	Italy	Marco Fassinotti; Gianmarco Tamberi; Silvano Chesani
Entry standard – 2.29	3	Ukraine	Bohdan Bondarenko; Andriy Protsenko; Dmytro Yakovenko
Entry standard – 2.29	3	United States	Erik Kynard; Ricky Robertson; Bradley Adkins
Entry standard – 2.29	2	Australia	Brandon Starc; Joel Baden
Entry standard – 2.29	2	Belarus	Andrei Churyla; Dzmitry Nabokau
Entry standard – 2.29	2	Canada	Derek Drouin; Michael Mason
Entry standard – 2.29	2	China	Wang Yu; Zhang Guowei
Entry standard – 2.29	2	Cyprus	Kyriakos Ioannou; Dimítrios Chondrokoúkis
Entry standard – 2.29	2	Germany	Eike Onnen; Mateusz Przybylko
Entry standard – 2.29	2	Great Britain	Chris Baker; Robbie Grabarz
Entry standard – 2.29	2	Greece	Antonios Mastoras; Konstantinos Baniotis
Entry standard – 2.29	2	Poland	Sylwester Bednarek; Wojciech Theiner
Entry standard – 2.29	2	Puerto Rico	Luis Castro; David Adley Smith II
Entry standard – 2.29	1	Brazil	Talles Silva
Entry standard – 2.29	1	Bulgaria	Tihomir Ivanov
Entry standard – 2.29	1	Czech Republic	Jaroslav Bába
Entry standard – 2.29	1	Israel	Dmitry Kroytor
Entry standard – 2.29	1	Japan	Takashi Eto
Entry standard – 2.29	1	Malaysia	Nauraj Singh Randhawa
Entry standard – 2.29	1	Mexico	Edgar Rivera
Entry standard – 2.29	1	Peru	Arturo Chávez
Entry standard – 2.29	1	Qatar	Mutaz Essa Barshim
Entry standard – 2.29	1	Romania	Mihai Donisan
Entry standard – 2.29	1	Slovakia	Matúš Bubeník
Entry standard – 2.29	2	South Korea	Yun Seung-hyun; Woo Sang-hyeok
Entry standard – 2.29	1	Syria	Majed Aldin Ghazal
Entry standard – 2.29	1	Chinese Taipei	Hsiang Chun-Hsien
Invitational places			
Universality places			
Total	45		

As of 10 June 2016

==== Men's pole vault ====
Qualification standard	No. of athletes	NOC	Nominated athletes
Entry standard – 5.70	3	China	Huang Bokai; Xue Changrui; Yao Jie
Entry standard – 5.70	3	France	Stanley Joseph; Renaud Lavillenie; Kévin Menaldo
Entry standard – 5.70	3	Germany	Tobias Scherbarth; Karsten Dilla; Raphael Holzdeppe
Entry standard – 5.70	3	Poland	Piotr Lisek; Robert Sobera; Paweł Wojciechowski
Entry standard – 5.70	3	United States	Logan Cunningham; Cale Simmons; Sam Kendricks
Entry standard – 5.70	2	Brazil	Thiago Braz da Silva; Augusto Dutra de Oliveira
Entry standard – 5.70	2	Czech Republic	Michal Balner; Jan Kudlička
Entry standard – 5.70	2	Japan	Hiroki Ogita; Seito Yamamoto
Entry standard – 5.70	2	Latvia	Mareks Ārents; Pauls Pujāts
Entry standard – 5.70	1	Argentina	Germán Chiaraviglio
Entry standard – 5.70	1	Australia	Kurtis Marschall
Entry standard – 5.70	1	Canada	Shawnacy Barber
Entry standard – 5.70	1	Croatia	Ivan Horvat
Entry standard – 5.70	1	Great Britain	Luke Cutts
Entry standard – 5.70	1	Greece	Konstantinos Filippidis
Entry standard – 5.70	1	Slovenia	Robert Renner
Entry standard – 5.70	1	Sweden	Melker Svärd Jacobsson
Invitational places	1	Kazakhstan	Nikita Filippov
Universality places			
Total	32		

As of 10 June 2016

==== Men's shot put ====
Qualification standard	No. of athletes	NOC	Nominated athletes
Entry standard – 20.50	3	Bosnia and Herzegovina	Hamza Alić; Kemal Mešić; Mesud Pezer
Entry standard – 20.50	3	Poland	Konrad Bukowiecki; Michał Haratyk; Tomasz Majewski
Entry standard – 20.50	3	United States	Ryan Crouser; Joe Kovacs; Darrell Hill
Entry standard – 20.50	2	Croatia	Filip Mihaljević; Stipe Žunić
Entry standard – 20.50	2	Germany	Tobias Dahm; David Storl
Entry standard – 20.50	2	New Zealand	Tomas Walsh; Jacko Gill
Entry standard – 20.50	2	Romania	Andrei Gag; Andrei Toader
Entry standard – 20.50	2	Spain	Carlos Tobalina; Borja Vivas
Entry standard – 20.50	1	Argentina	Germán Lauro
Entry standard – 20.50	1	Australia	Damien Birkinhead
Entry standard – 20.50	1	Belarus	Pavel Lyzhyn
Entry standard – 20.50	1	Brazil	Darlan Romani
Entry standard – 20.50	1	Bulgaria	Georgi Ivanov
Entry standard – 20.50	1	Canada	Tim Nedow
Entry standard – 20.50	1	Czech Republic	Tomáš Stanek
Entry standard – 20.50	1	Georgia	Benik Abramyan
Entry standard – 20.50	1	Greece	Nikólaos Skarvélis
Entry standard – 20.50	1	India	Inderjeet Singh
Entry standard – 20.50	1	Jamaica	O'Dayne Richards
Entry standard – 20.50	1	Kazakhstan	Ivan Ivanov
Entry standard – 20.50	1	Moldova	Ivan Emilianov
Entry standard – 20.50	1	Nigeria	Stephen Mozia
Entry standard – 20.50	1	Portugal	Tsanko Arnaudov
Entry standard – 20.50	1	Serbia	Asmir Kolašinac
Invitational places			
Universality places	1	British Virgin Islands	Eldred Henry
Universality places	1	Republic of the Congo	Franck Elemba
Total	36		

As of 10 June 2016

==== Men's discus throw ====
Qualification standard	No. of athletes	NOC	Nominated athletes
Entry standard – 65.00	3	Germany	Christoph Harting; Robert Harting; Daniel Jasinski
Entry standard – 65.00	3	United States	Tavis Bailey; Andrew Evans; Mason Finley
Entry standard – 65.00	2	Australia	Matt Denny; Benn Harradine
Entry standard – 65.00	2	Austria	Gerhard Mayer; Lukas Weißhaidinger
Entry standard – 65.00	2	Estonia	Gerd Kanter; Martin Kupper
Entry standard – 65.00	2	Iran	Ehsan Haddadi; Mahmoud Samimi
Entry standard – 65.00	2	Poland	Piotr Małachowski; Robert Urbanek
Entry standard – 65.00	2	Spain	Frank Casañas; Lois Maikel Martínez
Entry standard – 65.00	2	Sweden	Daniel Ståhl; Axel Härstedt
Entry standard – 65.00	1	Belgium	Philip Milanov
Entry standard – 65.00	1	Colombia	Mauricio Ortega
Entry standard – 65.00	1	Cuba	Jorge Fernández
Entry standard – 65.00	1	Cyprus	Apostolos Parellis
Entry standard – 65.00	1	Hungary	Zoltán Kővágó
Entry standard – 65.00	1	India	Vikas Gowda
Entry standard – 65.00	1	Jamaica	Fedrick Dacres
Entry standard – 65.00	1	Lithuania	Andrius Gudžius
Entry standard – 65.00	1	Samoa	Alex Rose
Entry standard – 65.00	1	South Africa	Victor Hogan
Entry standard – 65.00	1	Ukraine	Oleksiy Semenov
Invitational places			
Universality places			
Total	30		

As of 10 June 2016

==== Men's hammer throw ====
Qualification standard	No. of athletes	NOC	Nominated athletes
Entry standard – 77.00	3	Great Britain	Chris Bennett; Mark Dry; Nick Miller
Entry standard – 77.00	2	Iran	Kaveh Mousavi; Pejman Ghalenoei
Entry standard – 77.00	2	Egypt	Mostafa Al-Gamel; Hassan Mahmoud
Entry standard – 77.00	2	Poland	Pawel Fajdek; Wojciech Nowicki
Entry standard – 77.00	1	Azerbaijan	Dzmitry Marshin
Entry standard – 77.00	1	Brazil	Wagner Domingos
Entry standard – 77.00	1	Costa Rica	Roberto Sawyers
Entry standard – 77.00	1	Cuba	Roberto Janet
Entry standard – 77.00	1	Greece	Mihail Anastasakis
Entry standard – 77.00	1	Hungary	Krisztián Pars
Entry standard – 77.00	1	Israel	Oleksandr Drygol
Entry standard – 77.00	1	Italy	Marco Lingua
Entry standard – 77.00	1	Mexico	Diego del Real
Entry standard – 77.00	1	Moldova	Serghei Marghiev
Entry standard – 77.00	1	Qatar	Ashraf Amgad Elseify
Entry standard – 77.00	1	Slovakia	Marcel Lomnický
Entry standard – 77.00	1	Tajikistan	Dilshod Nazarov
Entry standard – 77.00	1	Spain	Javier Cienfuegos
Entry standard – 77.00	1	Ukraine	Yevhen Vynohradov
Entry standard – 77.00	1	Uzbekistan	Suhrob Khodjaev
Invitational places	3	United States	Conor McCullough; Kibwé Johnson; Rudy Winkler
Universality places			
Total	20		

As of 10 June 2016

==== Men's javelin throw ====
Qualification standard	No. of athletes	NOC	Nominated athletes
Entry standard – 83.00	3	Czech Republic	Petr Frydrych; Jakub Vadlejch; Vitezslav Veselý
Entry standard – 83.00	3	Estonia	Tanel Laanmäe; Magnus Kirt; Risto Mätas
Entry standard – 83.00	3	Finland	Tero Pitkämäki; Antti Ruuskanen; Ari Mannio
Entry standard – 83.00	3	Germany	Thomas Röhler; Johannes Vetter; Julian Weber
Entry standard – 83.00	3	United States	Sam Crouser; Cyrus Hostetler; Sean Furey
Entry standard – 83.00	2	Australia	Hamish Peacock; Joshua Robinson
Entry standard – 83.00	2	Latvia	Rolands Štrobinders; Zigismunds Sirmais
Entry standard – 83.00	2	Poland	Łukasz Grzeszczuk; Marcin Krukowski
Entry standard – 83.00	2	Ukraine	Oleksandr Pyatnytsya; Dmytro Kosynskyy
Entry standard – 83.00	1	Argentina	Braian Toledo
Entry standard – 83.00	1	Brazil	Júlio César de Oliveira
Entry standard – 83.00	1	Egypt	Ihab Abdelrahman
Entry standard – 83.00	1	Japan	Ryohei Arai
Entry standard – 83.00	1	Kenya	Julius Yego
Entry standard – 83.00	1	New Zealand	Stuart Farquhar
Entry standard – 83.00	1	South Africa	Rocco van Rooyen
Entry standard – 83.00	1	Sri Lanka	Sumeda Ranasinghe
Entry standard – 83.00	1	Chinese Taipei	Huang Shih-Feng
Entry standard – 83.00	1	Trinidad and Tobago	Keshorn Walcott
Entry standard – 83.00	1	Uzbekistan	Bobur Shokirjonov
Invitational places			
Universality places	1	Fiji	Leslie Copeland
Total	30		

As of 10 June 2016

=== Women's field events ===
==== Women's long jump ====
Qualification standard	No. of athletes	NOC	Nominated athletes
Entry standard – 6.70	3	Germany	Sosthene Moguenara; Alexandra Wester; Malaika Mihambo
Entry standard – 6.70	3	Great Britain	Shara Proctor; Jazmin Sawyers; Lorraine Ugen
Entry standard – 6.70	3	Spain	Juliet Itoya; María del Mar Jover; Concepción Montaner
Entry standard – 6.70	3	United States	Tianna Bartoletta; Janay DeLoach; Brittney Reese
Entry standard – 6.70	2	Australia	Chelsea Jaensch; Brooke Stratton
Entry standard – 6.70	2	Belarus	Nastassia Mironchyk-Ivanova; Volha Sudarava
Entry standard – 6.70	2	Brazil	Keila Costa; Eliane Martins
Entry standard – 6.70	2	Sweden	Khaddi Sagnia; Erica Jarder
Entry standard – 6.70	1	Armenia	Amaliya Sharoyan
Entry standard – 6.70	1	Bahamas	Bianca Stuart
Entry standard – 6.70	1	Barbados	Akela Jones
Entry standard – 6.70	1	Canada	Christabel Nettey
Entry standard – 6.70	1	Cuba	Yarianny Arguelles
Entry standard – 6.70	1	Estonia	Ksenija Balta
Entry standard – 6.70	1	Greece	Haido Alexouli
Entry standard – 6.70	1	Indonesia	Maria Natalia Londa
Entry standard – 6.70	1	Japan	Konomi Kai
Entry standard – 6.70	1	Mexico	Yvonne Treviño
Entry standard – 6.70	1	Romania	Alina Rotaru
Entry standard – 6.70	1	Serbia	Ivana Španović
Entry standard – 6.70	1	South Africa	Lynique Prinsloo
Entry standard – 6.70	1	Turkey	Karin Melis Mey
Entry standard – 6.70	1	Ukraine	Krystyna Hryshutyna
Invitational places	1	Independent Olympic Athletes	Darya Klishina
Universality places			
Total	36		

As of 2 July 2016

==== Women's triple jump ====
Qualification standard	No. of athletes	NOC	Nominated athletes
Entry standard – 14.15	3	United States	Christina Epps; Andrea Geubelle; Keturah Orji
Entry standard – 14.15	2	Belarus	Kseniya Dziatsuk; Iryna Vaskouskaya
Entry standard – 14.15	2	Brazil	Keila Costa; Núbia Soares
Entry standard – 14.15	2	Colombia	Caterine Ibargüen; Yosiris Urrutia
Entry standard – 14.15	2	Germany	Kristin Gierisch; Jenny Elbe
Entry standard – 14.15	2	Italy	Dariya Derkach; Simona La Mantia
Entry standard – 14.15	2	Jamaica	Kimberly Williams; Shanieka Thomas
Entry standard – 14.15	2	Kazakhstan	Irina Ektova; Olga Rypakova
Entry standard – 14.15	2	Portugal	Susana Costa; Patrícia Mamona
Entry standard – 14.15	2	Romania	Cristina Bujin; Elena Andreea Panţuroiu
Entry standard – 14.15	1	Bulgaria	Gabriela Petrova
Entry standard – 14.15	1	China	Li Xiaohong
Entry standard – 14.15	1	Cuba	Liadagmis Povea
Entry standard – 14.15	1	Finland	Kristiina Mäkelä
Entry standard – 14.15	1	France	Jeanine Assani Issouf
Entry standard – 14.15	1	Greece	Paraskevi Papachristou
Entry standard – 14.15	1	Israel	Hanna Knyazyeva-Minenko
Entry standard – 14.15	1	Lithuania	Dovilė Dzindzaletaitė
Entry standard – 14.15	1	Poland	Anna Jagaciak-Michalska
Entry standard – 14.15	1	Slovakia	Dana Velďáková
Entry standard – 14.15	1	Spain	Patricia Sarrapio
Entry standard – 14.15	1	Ukraine	Olga Saladukha
Entry standard – 14.15	1	Venezuela	Yulimar Rojas
Invitational places	1	Dominica	Thea LaFond
Universality places	1	Cameroon	Joëlle Mbumi Nkouindjin
Total	37		

As of 10 June 2016

==== Women's high jump ====
Qualification standard	No. of athletes	NOC	Nominated athletes
Entry standard – 1.93	3	Ukraine	Iryna Herashchenko; Oksana Okuneva; Yuliya Chumachenko
Entry standard – 1.93	3	United States	Vashti Cunningham; Chaunté Lowe; Inika McPherson
Entry standard – 1.93	2	Croatia	Ana Šimić; Blanka Vlašić
Entry standard – 1.93	2	Great Britain	Morgan Lake
Entry standard – 1.93	2	Italy	Alessia Trost; Desirée Rossit
Entry standard – 1.93	2	Saint Lucia	Jeanelle Scheper; Levern Spencer
Entry standard – 1.93	2	Sweden	Erika Kinsey; Sofie Skoog
Entry standard – 1.93	2	Uzbekistan	Svetlana Radzivil; Nadezhda Dusanova
Entry standard – 1.93	1	Australia	Eleanor Patterson
Entry standard – 1.93	1	Barbados	Akela Jones
Entry standard – 1.93	1	Bulgaria	Mirela Demireva
Entry standard – 1.93	1	Canada	Alyxandria Treasure
Entry standard – 1.93	1	Cyprus	Leontia Kallenou
Entry standard – 1.93	1	Czech Republic	Michaela Hrubá
Entry standard – 1.93	1	Germany	Marie-Laurence Jungfleisch
Entry standard – 1.93	1	Hungary	Barbara Szabó
Entry standard – 1.93	1	Lithuania	Airinė Palšytė
Entry standard – 1.93	1	Nigeria	Doreen Amata
Entry standard – 1.93	1	Poland	Kamila Lićwinko
Entry standard – 1.93	1	Romania	Daniela Stanciu
Entry standard – 1.93	1	Spain	Ruth Beitia
Invitational places			
Universality places	1	Seychelles	Lissa Labiche
Total	32		

As of 10 June 2016

==== Women's pole vault ====
Qualification standard	No. of athletes	NOC	Nominated athletes
Entry standard – 4.50	3	Canada	Annika Newell; Alysha Newman; Kelsie Ahbe
Entry standard – 4.50	3	Germany	Lisa Ryzih; Annika Roloff; Martina Strutz
Entry standard – 4.50	3	United States	Sandi Morris; Jenn Suhr; Alexis Weeks
Entry standard – 4.50	2	Brazil	Fabiana Murer; Joana Costa
Entry standard – 4.50	2	China	Li Ling; Ren Mengqian
Entry standard – 4.50	2	Czech Republic	Jiřina Svobodová; Romana Maláčová
Entry standard – 4.50	2	Finland	Minna Nikkanen; Wilma Murto
Entry standard – 4.50	2	Greece	Nikoleta Kyriakopoulou; Ekaterini Stefanidi
Entry standard – 4.50	2	Portugal	Marta Onofre; Leonor Tavares
Entry standard – 4.50	2	Sweden	Angelica Bengtsson; Michaela Meijer
Entry standard – 4.50	1	Australia	Alana Boyd
Entry standard – 4.50	1	Cuba	Yarisley Silva
Entry standard – 4.50	1	France	Vanessa Boslak
Entry standard – 4.50	1	Great Britain	Holly Bradshaw
Entry standard – 4.50	1	Ireland	Tori Pena
Entry standard – 4.50	1	Italy	Sonia Malavisi
Entry standard – 4.50	1	Netherlands	Femke Pluim
Entry standard – 4.50	1	New Zealand	Eliza McCartney
Entry standard – 4.50	1	Puerto Rico	Diamara Planell
Entry standard – 4.50	1	Slovenia	Tina Šutej
Entry standard – 4.50	1	Switzerland	Nicole Büchler
Entry standard – 4.50	1	Venezuela	Robeilys Peinado
Invitational places			
Universality places			
Total	36		

As of 10 June 2016

==== Women's shot put ====
Qualification standard	No. of athletes	NOC	Nominated athletes
Entry standard – 17.75	3	Belarus	Aliona Dubitskaya; Yuliya Leantsiuk; Natallia Mikhnevich
Entry standard – 17.75	3	China	Gao Yang; Gong Lijiao; Guo Tianqian
Entry standard – 17.75	3	United States	Michelle Carter; Felisha Johnson; Raven Saunders
Entry standard – 17.75	2	Canada	Brittany Crew; Taryn Suttie
Entry standard – 17.75	3	Germany	Sara Gambetta; Christina Schwanitz; Lena Urbaniak
Entry standard – 17.75	2	Great Britain	
Entry standard – 17.75	2	Ukraine	Halyna Obleshchuk; Olha Holodna
Entry standard – 17.75	1	Brazil	Geisa Arcanjo
Entry standard – 17.75	1	Bulgaria	Radoslava Mavrodieva
Entry standard – 17.75	1	Chile	Natalia Duco
Entry standard – 17.75	1	Colombia	Sandra Lemos
Entry standard – 17.75	1	Cuba	Yaniuvis López
Entry standard – 17.75	1	Hungary	Anita Márton
Entry standard – 17.75	1	India	Manpreet Kaur
Entry standard – 17.75	1	Iran	Leyla Rajabi
Entry standard – 17.75	1	Italy	Chiara Rosa
Entry standard – 17.75	1	Jamaica	Danniel Thomas
Entry standard – 17.75	1	Moldova	Dimitriana Surdu
Entry standard – 17.75	1	Netherlands	Melissa Boekelman
Entry standard – 17.75	1	New Zealand	Valerie Adams
Entry standard – 17.75	1	Poland	Paulina Guba
Entry standard – 17.75	1	Trinidad and Tobago	Cleopatra Borel
Entry standard – 17.75	1	Turkey	Emel Dereli
Entry standard – 17.75	1	Venezuela	Ahymara Espinoza
Invitational places			
Universality places	1	Cameroon	Auriol Dongmo
Universality places	1	Guinea-Bissau	Jéssica Inchude
Total	36		

As of 10 June 2016

==== Women's discus throw ====
Qualification standard	No. of athletes	NOC	Nominated athletes
Entry standard – 61.00	3	China	Lu Xiaoxin; Tan Jian; Su Xinyue
Entry standard – 61.00	3	Germany	Julia Fischer; Nadine Müller; Shanice Craft
Entry standard – 61.00	3	Jamaica	Tarasue Barnett; Shadae Lawrence; Kellion Knibb
Entry standard – 61.00	3	United States	Whitney Ashley; Kelsey Card; Shelbi Vaughan
Entry standard – 61.00	2	Brazil	Andressa de Morais; Fernanda Martins
Entry standard – 61.00	2	Cuba	Denia Caballero; Yaime Pérez
Entry standard – 61.00	2	France	Mélina Robert-Michon; Pauline Pousse
Entry standard – 61.00	1	Argentina	Rocio Comba
Entry standard – 61.00	1	Australia	Dani Samuels
Entry standard – 61.00	1	Chile	Karen Gallardo
Entry standard – 61.00	1	Croatia	Sandra Perković
Entry standard – 61.00	1	Great Britain	Jade Lally
Entry standard – 61.00	1	Greece	Chrysoula Anagnostopoulou
Entry standard – 61.00	1	India	Seema Punia
Entry standard – 61.00	1	Lithuania	Zinaida Sendriūtė
Entry standard – 61.00	1	Moldova	Natalia Stratulat
Entry standard – 61.00	1	Poland	Żaneta Glanc
Entry standard – 61.00	1	Portugal	Irina Rodrigues
Entry standard – 61.00	1	Serbia	Dragana Tomašević
Entry standard – 61.00	1	Spain	Sabina Asenjo
Entry standard – 61.00	1	Ukraine	Nataliya Semenova
Invitational places			
Universality places			
Total	31		

As of 10 June 2016

==== Women's hammer throw ====
Qualification standard	No. of athletes	NOC	Nominated athletes
Entry standard – 71.00	3	China	Liu Tingting; Wang Zheng; Zhang Wenxiu
Entry standard – 71.00	3	Germany	Betty Heidler; Kathrin Klaas; Charlene Woitha
Entry standard – 71.00	3	Poland	Joanna Fiodorow; Malwina Kopron; Anita Włodarczyk
Entry standard – 71.00	3	United States	Gwen Berry; Amber Campbell; DeAnna Price
Entry standard – 71.00	2	Belarus	Aksana Miankova; Alena Sobaleva
Entry standard – 71.00	2	Moldova	Marina Marghieva; Zalina Marghieva
Entry standard – 71.00	1	Argentina	Jennifer Dahlgren
Entry standard – 71.00	1	Azerbaijan	Hanna Skydan
Entry standard – 71.00	1	Canada	Heather Steacy
Entry standard – 71.00	1	Cuba	Yirisleydi Ford
Entry standard – 71.00	1	Czech Republic	Kateřina Šafránková
Entry standard – 71.00	1	France	Alexandra Tavernier
Entry standard – 71.00	1	Great Britain	Sophie Hitchon
Entry standard – 71.00	1	Jamaica	Daina Levy
Entry standard – 71.00	1	Slovakia	Martina Hrašnová
Entry standard – 71.00	1	Turkey	Kıvılcım Kaya
Entry standard – 71.00	1	Ukraine	Iryna Novozhylova
Entry standard – 71.00	1	Venezuela	Rosa Rodríguez
Invitational places			
Universality places			
Total	29		

As of 10 June 2016

==== Women's javelin throw ====
Qualification standard	No. of athletes	NOC	Nominated athletes
Entry standard – 62.00	3	Australia	Kimberley Mickle; Kelsey-Lee Roberts; Kathryn Mitchell
Entry standard – 62.00	3	China	Li Lingwei; Liu Shiying; Lü Huihui
Entry standard – 62.00	3	Germany	Christin Hussong; Christina Obergföll; Linda Stahl
Entry standard – 62.00	2	Latvia	Madara Palameika; Sinta Ozoliņa-Kovala
Entry standard – 62.00	2	United States	Maggie Malone; Brittany Borman
Entry standard – 62.00	1	Belarus	Tatsiana Khaladovich
Entry standard – 62.00	1	Canada	Elizabeth Gleadle
Entry standard – 62.00	1	Colombia	Flor Ruiz
Entry standard – 62.00	1	Croatia	Sara Kolak
Entry standard – 62.00	1	Cuba	Yulenmis Aguilar
Entry standard – 62.00	1	Czech Republic	Barbora Špotáková
Entry standard – 62.00	1	Estonia	Liina Laasma
Entry standard – 62.00	1	Finland	Sanni Utriainen
Entry standard – 62.00	1	France	Mathilde Andraud
Entry standard – 62.00	1	Great Britain	
Entry standard – 62.00	1	Iceland	Ásdís Hjálmsdóttir
Entry standard – 62.00	1	Israel	Marharyta Dorozhon
Entry standard – 62.00	1	Japan	Yuki Ebihara
Entry standard – 62.00	1	Poland	Maria Andrejczyk
Entry standard – 62.00	1	Slovenia	Martina Ratej
Entry standard – 62.00	1	South Africa	Sunette Viljoen
Entry standard – 62.00	1	Ukraine	Kateryna Derun
Invitational places	1	Nicaragua	Dalila Rugama
Universality places			
Total	31		

As of 10 June 2016

== Combined events ==
=== Men's decathlon ===
Qualification standard	No. of athletes	NOC	Nominated athletes
Entry standard – 8100	3	Germany	Kai Kazmirek; Arthur Abele; Rico Freimuth
Entry standard – 8100	3	United States	Ashton Eaton; Jeremy Taiwo; Zach Ziemek
Entry standard – 8100	2	Cuba	Yordanis García; Leonel Suárez
Entry standard – 8100	2	Estonia	Maicel Uibo; Karl Robert Saluri
Entry standard – 8100	2	France	Bastien Auzeil; Kevin Mayer
Entry standard – 8100	2	Grenada	Kurt Felix; Lindon Victor
Entry standard – 8100	2	Japan	Keisuke Ushiro; Akihiko Nakamura
Entry standard – 8100	2	Netherlands	Pieter Braun; Eelco Sintnicolaas
Entry standard – 8100	1	Algeria	Larbi Bourrada
Entry standard – 8100	1	Australia	Cedric Dubler
Entry standard – 8100	1	Austria	Dominik Distelberger
Entry standard – 8100	1	Belarus	Andrei Krauchanka
Entry standard – 8100	1	Belgium	Thomas Van der Plaetsen
Entry standard – 8100	1	Brazil	Luiz Alberto de Araújo
Entry standard – 8100	1	Canada	Damian Warner
Entry standard – 8100	2	Czech Republic	Adam Helcelet; Jiří Sýkora
Entry standard – 8100	1	Poland	Paweł Wiesiołek
Entry standard – 8100	1	Serbia	Mihail Dudaš
Entry standard – 8100	1	South Africa	Willem Coertzen
Entry standard – 8100	1	Spain	Pau Tonnesen
Entry standard – 8100	1	Ukraine	Oleksiy Kasyanov
Entry standard – 8100	1	Uzbekistan	Leonid Andreev
Invitational places	1	Madagascar	Ali Kame
Universality places			
Total	34		

As of 10 June 2016

=== Women's heptathlon ===
Qualification standard	No. of athletes	NOC	Nominated athletes
Entry standard – 6200	3	Germany	Claudia Rath; Carolin Schäfer; Jennifer Oeser
Entry standard – 6200	3	Netherlands	Nadine Broersen; Anouk Vetter; Nadine Visser
Entry standard – 6200	3	United States	Barbara Nwaba; Heather Miller-Koch; Kendell Williams
Entry standard – 6200	2	Belarus	Yana Maksimava; Katsiaryna Netsviatayeva
Entry standard – 6200	2	Czech Republic	Kateřina Cachová; Eliška Klučinová
Entry standard – 6200	2	Great Britain	Jessica Ennis-Hill; Katarina Johnson-Thompson
Entry standard – 6200	2	Hungary	Xénia Krizsán; Györgyi Farkas
Entry standard – 6200	2	Ukraine	Alina Fyodorova; Hanna Melnychenko
Entry standard – 6200	1	Austria	Ivona Dadic
Entry standard – 6200	1	Barbados	Akela Jones
Entry standard – 6200	1	Belgium	Nafissatou Thiam
Entry standard – 6200	1	Canada	Brianne Theisen-Eaton
Entry standard – 6200	1	Colombia	Evelis Aguilar
Entry standard – 6200	1	Cuba	Yorgelis Rodríguez
Entry standard – 6200	1	Estonia	Grit Šadeiko
Entry standard – 6200	1	France	Antoinette Nana Djimou Ida
Entry standard – 6200	1	Latvia	Laura Ikauniece
Entry standard – 6200	1	Nigeria	Uhunoma Osazuwa
Entry standard – 6200	1	Uzbekistan	Ekaterina Voronina
Invitational places	1	Brazil	Vanessa Spinola
Invitational places	1	Poland	Karolina Tymińska
Universality places			
Total	33		

As of 13 July 2016

== Relay events ==
- IAAF Qualified Relay Teams

=== Men's 4 × 100 m relay ===
Qualification standard	No. of teams	Qualified teams
2015 IAAF World Relays	8	United States; Jamaica; Japan; Brazil; France; Saint Kitts and Nevis; Trinidad and Tobago; Germany
IAAF World Ranking List (as of July 12, 2016)	8	Antigua and Barbuda; Canada; China; Cuba; Dominican Republic; Great Britain; Netherlands; Turkey

=== Men's 4 × 400 m relay ===
Qualification standard	No. of teams	Qualified teams
2015 IAAF World Relays	8	United States; Bahamas; Belgium; Jamaica; Brazil; Great Britain; Trinidad and Tobago; Botswana
IAAF World Ranking List (as of July 12, 2016)	8	Colombia; Cuba; Dominican Republic; France; India; Japan; Poland; Venezuela

=== Women's 4 × 100 m relay ===
Qualification standard	No. of teams	Qualified teams
2015 IAAF World Relays	8	Jamaica; United States; Great Britain; Canada; Trinidad and Tobago; Brazil; Nigeria; Switzerland
IAAF World Ranking List (as of July 12, 2016)	8	China; France; Germany; Ghana; Kazakhstan; Netherlands; Poland; Ukraine

=== Women's 4 × 400 m relay ===
Qualification standard	No. of teams	Qualified teams
2015 IAAF World Relays	8	United States; Jamaica; Great Britain; France; Poland; Canada; Australia; Brazil
IAAF World Ranking List (as of July 12, 2016)	8	Bahamas; Germany; India; Italy; Netherlands; ~~Nigeria~~; Romania; Ukraine; Cuba
