= Boulaid =

Boulaid is a North African surname. Notable people with the surname include:

- Koutar Boulaid (born 1989), Moroccan long-distance runner
- Mostefa Ben Boulaïd (1917–1956), Algerian revolutionary leader
