= Hua Shaoqing =

Chinese long-distance runner (born 1994)

Personal information
- Nationality: Chinese
- Born: 12 February 1994 (age 32)
- Height: 172 cm (5 ft 8 in)
- Weight: 54 kg (119 lb)

Sport
- Sport: Track and field
- Event: Marathon
- University team: Wuhan University of Science and Technology

Hua Shaoqing (Simplified Chinese:华 绍青, born 12 February 1994) is a Chinese long-distance runner who specialises in the marathon. She competed in the women's marathon event at the 2016 Summer Olympics.
