= Yue Chao =

Chinese long-distance runner

Personal information
- Nationality: Chinese
- Born: 5 January 1991 (age 35) Yangzhou, China

Sport
- Sport: Track and field
- Event: Marathon

Yue Chao (born 5 January 1991) is a Chinese long-distance runner who specialises in the marathon. She competed in the women's marathon event at the 2016 Summer Olympics.
