= Panayiota Vlahaki =

Greek athlete

Personal information
- Born: 3 April 1991 (age 35)
- Height: 167 cm (5 ft 6 in)
- Weight: 50 kg (110 lb)

Sport
- Sport: Track and field
- Event: Marathon

Panayiota Vlahaki (born 3 April 1991) is a Greek long-distance runner who specialises in the marathon. She competed in the women's marathon event at the 2016 Summer Olympics. She finished in 118th place with a time of 2:59:12.
