= Viviana Chávez =

Argentine long-distance runner

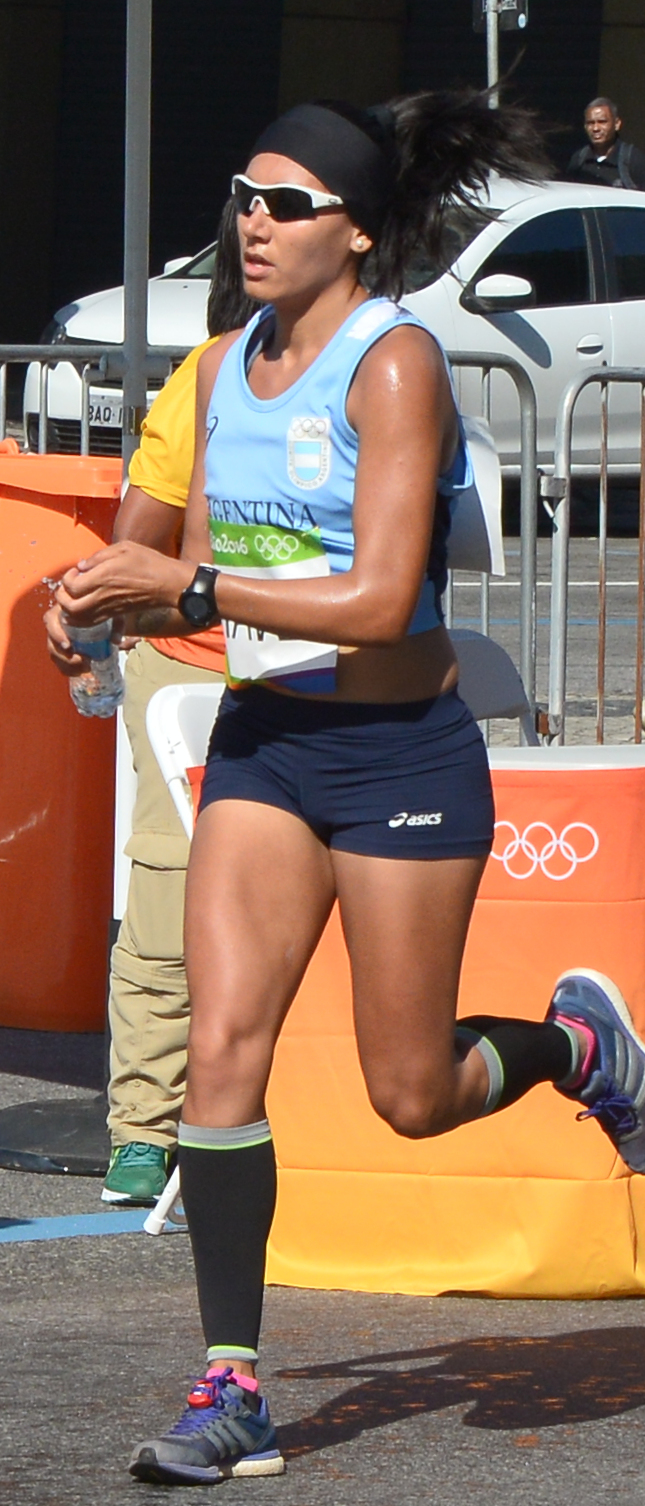
- Chávez at the 2016 Olympics

Personal information
- Born: 28 May 1987 (age 39) San Juan, Argentina
- Height: 164 cm (5 ft 5 in)
- Weight: 52 kg (115 lb)

Sport
- Sport: Track and field
- Event: Marathon
- Club: FILA
- Coached by: Dario Nunez

Achievements and titles
- Personal best: 2:38:27 (2016)

Viviana Chávez (born 28 May 1987) is an Argentinean marathon runner. She finished 125th at the 2016 Olympics. She took up long-distance running in 2010.
