= Neo Jie Shi =

Singaporean marathon runner

Neo Jie Shi (Chinese: 梁潔詩; born May 20, 1985) is a Singaporean marathon runner. She competed at the 2016 Summer Olympics in the women's marathon, in which she placed 131st.
