= Kellys Arias =

Colombian runner (born 1989)

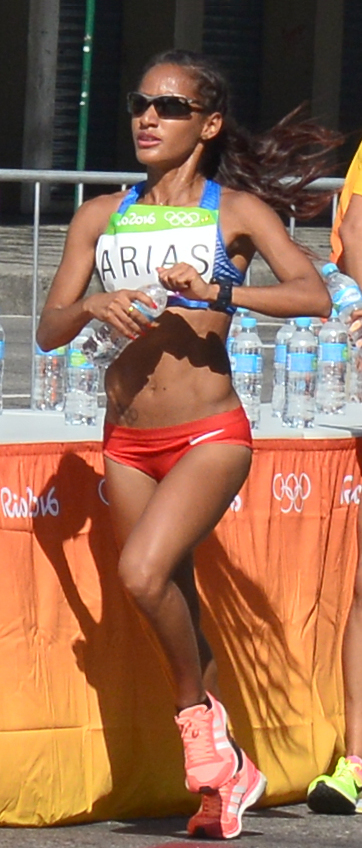
- Kellys Arias at the 2016 Summer Olympics

Personal information
- Full name: Kellys Yesenia Arias Figueroa
- Born: 3 July 1989 (age 37) Maicao, Colombia
- Height: 1.47 m (4 ft 10 in)
- Weight: 40 kg (88 lb)

Sport
- Sport: Track and field
- Event: Marathon

Kellys Arias (born 3 July 1989) is a Colombian long-distance runner who specialises in the marathon. She competed in the women's marathon event at the 2016 Summer Olympics. She holds Colombia's women's division records in the marathon (2:29:36, 6th place women's division at 2016 Hamburg Marathon, an Olympic qualifying time) and the half marathon (1:11:21, 19th place women's division at 2016 IAAF World Half Marathon Championships at Cardiff University) and in the lead up to the Rio Olympics she won the 2016 Panama City Half Marathon. On 8 July 2018 Arias won the 10,000 meters in 34:39.32 at the Colombian National Championships on the new track at Rafael Cotes Municipal Stadium in Barranquilla. The track was renovated in preparation for the 2018 Central American and Caribbean Games where Arias finished 5th out of 7 runners in the 10k final in 35:01.57 on 29 July.
