= Kawtar Boulaid =

Moroccan athlete (born 1989)

Personal information
- Born: 10 October 1989 (age 36)

Sport
- Sport: Track and field
- Event: Marathon

Kawtar Boulaid (born 10 October 1989) is a Moroccan long-distance runner who specialises in the marathon. She competed in the women's marathon event at the 2016 Summer Olympics.
