= Athletics at the 2016 Summer Olympics – Women's marathon =

Women's marathon at the Games of the XXXI Olympiad
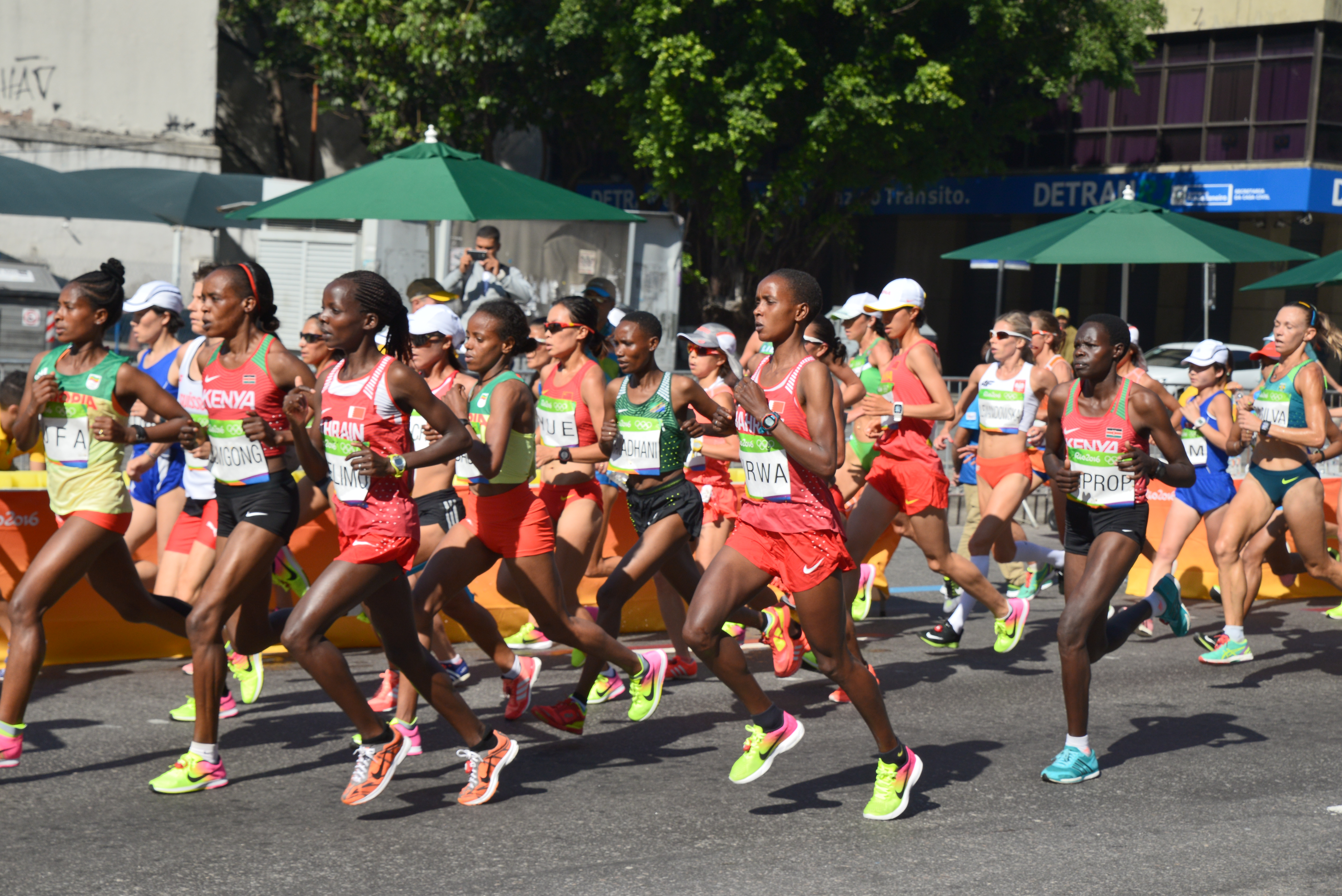
- View of a congested group of competitors during the Women's marathon race
- Venue: Sambadrome
- Date: 14 August 2016
- Competitors: 157 from 80 nations
- Winning time: 2:24:04

Medalists
1st place, gold medalist(s)		Jemima Sumgong	Kenya
2nd place, silver medalist(s)		Eunice Kirwa	Bahrain
3rd place, bronze medalist(s)		Mare Dibaba	Ethiopia

Video on YouTube Official Video Highlights

The women's marathon event at the 2016 Summer Olympics took place on 14 August on the Sambadrome.

== Summary ==
At 9:30 in the morning, the race started with temperatures around 19 °C (66 °F). The pack stayed bunched, with Mare Dibaba, Visiline Jepkesho, Rose Chelimo, Volha Mazuronak and Tirfi Tsegaye each taking their turns in the spotlight. The racing got serious, the pack was down to seven at 30 kilometres with American Desiree Linden the closest pursuer but unable to get back with the group. Shalane Flanagan was consistently toward the back of the group, then she began to fall off. As Flanagan and Mazuronak struggled with the group, the remaining five African runners surged, the gap grew. Chelimo was the next to drop off the group.

Eunice Kirwa never held the lead and Jemima Sumgong only asserted herself in the last 5 kilometers. When she did the pack strung out to a straight line, former race walker Mazuronak and Tsegaye falling off the back. At a water station, Dibaba was the last to fall off, and then there were two. World Championship bronze medalist and Nagoya Champion Kirwa shadowing London Champion Sumgong until the final kilometer. Then Sumgong expanded the gap in the long final straight into the finish. By the finish of the race, the temperature had risen to 26 °C (79 °F).

Three sets of twins finished the marathon; two of the Luik triplets from Estonia, the Hahner twins from Germany and the Kim sisters from North Korea.

The medals were presented by Nawal El Moutawakel, IOC member, Morocco and Hiroshi Yokokawa, Council Member of the IAAF.

== Records ==
Prior to this event, the existing world and Olympic records were as follows:

World record	Paula Radcliffe (GBR)	2:15:25	London, United Kingdom	13 April 2003
Olympic record	Tiki Gelana (ETH)	2:23:07	London, United Kingdom	5 August 2012
2016 World leading	Tirfi Tsegaye (ETH)	2:19:41	Dubai, UAE	22 January 2016

== Schedule ==
All times are Brasília Time (UTC−3).

Date	Time	Round
Sunday, 14 August 2016	9:30	Finals

== Results ==
Rank	Name	Nationality/region	Time	Notes
1st place, gold medalist(s)	Jemima Sumgong	Kenya	2:24:04	
2nd place, silver medalist(s)	Eunice Kirwa	Bahrain	2:24:13	
3rd place, bronze medalist(s)	Mare Dibaba	Ethiopia	2:24:30	
4	Tirfi Tsegaye	Ethiopia	2:24:47	
5	Volha Mazuronak	Belarus	2:24:48	
6	Shalane Flanagan	United States	2:25:26	SB
7	Desiree Linden	United States	2:26:08	SB
8	Rose Chelimo	Bahrain	2:27:36	
9	Amy Cragg	United States	2:28:25	
10	Kim Hye-song	North Korea	2:28:36	SB
11	Kim Hye-gyong	North Korea	2:28:36	
12	Jeļena Prokopčuka	Latvia	2:29:32	
13	Valeria Straneo	Italy	2:29:44	SB
14	Kayoko Fukushi	Japan	2:29:53	
15	Gladys Tejeda	Peru	2:29:55	SB
16	Ana Dulce Félix	Portugal	2:30:39	
17	Diana Lobačevskė	Lithuania	2:30:48	
18	Milly Clark	Australia	2:30:53	
19	Tomomi Tanaka	Japan	2:31:12	
20	Fionnuala McCormack	Ireland	2:31:22	PB
21	Iwona Lewandowska	Poland	2:31:41	
22	Jessica Trengove	Australia	2:31:44	
23	Monika Stefanowicz	Poland	2:32:49	
24	Lanni Marchant	Canada	2:33:08	
25	Catherine Bertone	Italy	2:33:29	
26	Eva Vrabcová-Nývltová	Czech Republic	2:33:51	
27	Lilia Fisikowici	Moldova	2:34:05	PB
28	Alyson Dixon	Great Britain	2:34:11	
29	Maja Neuenschwander	Switzerland	2:34:27	
30	Sonia Samuels	Great Britain	2:34:36	
31	Lisa Jane Weightman	Australia	2:34:41	
32	Madaí Pérez	Mexico	2:34:42	
33	Olha Kotovska	Ukraine	2:34:57	SB
34	Azucena Díaz	Spain	2:35:02	
35	Krista DuChene	Canada	2:35:29	
36	Jovana de la Cruz	Peru	2:35:49	
37	Rasa Drazdauskaitė	Lithuania	2:35:50	
38	Vaida Žūsinaitė	Lithuania	2:35:53	
39	Yiu Kit Ching	Hong Kong	2:36:11	NR
40	Jessica Draskau-Petersson	Denmark	2:36:14	
41	Beata Naigambo	Namibia	2:36:32	
42	Ahn Seul-ki	South Korea	2:36:50	
43	Angie Orjuela	Colombia	2:37:05	
44	Anja Scherl	Germany	2:37:23	
45	Maryna Damantsevich	Belarus	2:37:34	
46	Mai Ito	Japan	2:37:37	
47	Veerle Dejaeghere	Belgium	2:37:39	
48	Margarita Hernández	Mexico	2:38:15	
49	Kim Kum-ok	North Korea	2:38:24	
50	Kenza Dahmani	Algeria	2:38:37	
51	Anne-Mari Hyryläinen	Finland	2:39:02	
52	Zsófia Erdélyi	Hungary	2:39:04	
53	Yue Chao	China	2:39:09	
54	Sitora Hamidova	Uzbekistan	2:39:45	PB
55	Anne Holm Baumeister	Denmark	2:39:49	
56	Helalia Johannes	Namibia	2:39:55	
57	Lizzie Lee	Ireland	2:39:57	
58	Esma Aydemir	Turkey	2:39:59	
59	Iuliia Andreeva	Kyrgyzstan	2:40:34	
60	Andrea Deelstra	Netherlands	2:40:49	
61	Ilona Marhele	Latvia	2:41:02	
62	Viktoriia Poliudina	Kyrgyzstan	2:41:37	
63	Dina Lebo Phalula	South Africa	2:41:46	
64	Andrea Mayr	Austria	2:41:52	
65	Krisztina Papp	Hungary	2:42:03	
66	Svitlana Stanko-Klymenko	Ukraine	2:42:26	
67	Mayada Al-Sayad	Palestine	2:42:28	
68	Nyakisi Adero	Uganda	2:42:39	SB
69	Adriana Aparecida da Silva	Brazil	2:43:22	
70	Lim Kyung-hee	South Korea	2:43:31	
71	Beverly Ramos	Puerto Rico	2:43:52	
72	Munkhzaya Bayartsogt	Mongolia	2:43:55	
73	Erika Abril	Colombia	2:44:05	
74	Manuela Soccol	Belgium	2:44:18	
75	Alina Armas	Namibia	2:44:20	
76	Breege Connolly	Ireland	2:44:41	
77	Marina Khmelevskaya	Uzbekistan	2:45:06	
78	Marily dos Santos	Brazil	2:45:08	
79	Hua Shaoqing	China	2:45:09	
80	Nebiat Habtemariam	Eritrea	2:45:21	
81	Anna Hahner	Germany	2:45:32	
82	Lisa Hahner	Germany	2:45:33	
83	Tünde Szabó	Hungary	2:45:37	
84	Els Rens	Belgium	2:45:52	
85	Luvsanlkhündegiin Otgonbayar	Mongolia	2:45:55	
86	Visiline Jepkesho	Kenya	2:46:05	
87	Nataliya Lehonkova	Ukraine	2:46:08	
88	Ourania Rebouli	Greece	2:46:32	
89	O. P. Jaisha	India	2:47:19	
90	Maor Tiyouri	Israel	2:47:27	
91	Jane Vongvorachoti	Thailand	2:47:27	
92	Rutendo Nyahora	Zimbabwe	2:47:32	
93	Yolimar Pineda	Venezuela	2:47:34	
94	Mariya Korobitskaya	Kyrgyzstan	2:47:53	
95	Silvia Paredes	Ecuador	2:48:01	
96	Christine Kalmer	South Africa	2:48:24	
97	Lily Luik	Estonia	2:48:29	
98	Tereza Master	Malawi	2:48:34	NR
99	María Elena Calle	Ecuador	2:48:39	
100	Rosa Chacha	Ecuador	2:48:52	
101	Paula Todoran	Romania	2:48:54	
102	Dailín Belmonte	Cuba	2:48:58	
103	Sofia Riga	Greece	2:49:07	
104	Matea Matošević	Croatia	2:50:00	
105	Érika Olivera	Chile	2:50:29	
106	Ariana Hilborn	Latvia	2:50:51	
107	Katarína Berešová	Slovakia	2:50:54	
108	Militsa Mircheva	Bulgaria	2:51:06	
109	Chirine Njeim	Lebanon	2:51:08	
110	Rosa Godoy	Argentina	2:52:31	
111	Sultan Haydar	Turkey	2:53:57	
112	Meryem Erdoğan	Turkey	2:54:04	
113	Hsieh Chien-ho	Chinese Taipei	2:54:18	
114	Leila Luik	Estonia	2:54:38	
115	Carmen Martínez	Paraguay	2:56:43	
116	Lucia Kimani	Bosnia and Herzegovina	2:58:22	
117	Rosemary Quispe	Bolivia	2:58:32	
118	Panayiota Vlahaki	Greece	2:59:12	
119	Marija Vrajić	Croatia	2:59:24	
120	Kavita Tungar	India	2:59:29	
121	Sara Ramadhani	Tanzania	3:00:03	
122	Irina Smolnikova	Kazakhstan	3:00:31	
123	Natalia Romero	Chile	3:01:29	
124	Mary Joy Tabal	Philippines	3:02:27	
125	Viviana Chavez	Argentina	3:03:23	
126	Claudette Mukasakindi	Rwanda	3:05:57	
127	Chen Yu-hsuan	Chinese Taipei	3:09:13	
128	Graciete Santana	Brazil	3:09:15	
129	Niluka Geethani Rajasekara	Sri Lanka	3:11:05	
130	Natthaya Thanaronnawat	Thailand	3:11:31	
131	Neo Jie Shi	Singapore	3:15:18	
132	Sarah Attar	Saudi Arabia	3:16:11	
133	Nary Ly	Cambodia	3:20:20	
–	Katarzyna Kowalska	Poland	DNF	
–	Helah Kiprop	Kenya	DNF	
–	Lonah Chemtai Salpeter	Israel	DNF	
–	Anna Incerti	Italy	DNF	
–	Christelle Daunay	France	DNF	
–	Alessandra Aguilar	Spain	DNF	
–	Souad Aït Salem	Algeria	DNF	
–	Inés Melchor	Peru	DNF	
–	Kellys Arias	Colombia	DNF	
–	Olivera Jevtić	Serbia	DNF	
–	Estela Navascués	Spain	DNF	
–	Liina Luik	Estonia	DNF	
–	María Peralta	Argentina	DNF	
–	Tigist Tufa	Ethiopia	DNF	
–	Jéssica Augusto	Portugal	DNF	
–	Nastassia Ivanova	Belarus	DNF	
–	Shitaye Eshete	Bahrain	DNF	
–	Gulzhanat Zhanatbek	Kazakhstan	DNF	
–	Daniela Cârlan	Romania	DNF	
–	Slađana Perunović	Montenegro	DNF	
–	Sara Moreira	Portugal	DNF	
–	Koutar Boulaid	Morocco	DNF	
–	Daneja Grandovec	Slovenia	DNF	
–	Irvette van Zyl	South Africa	DNS	
