= Breege Connolly =

Irish marathon runner

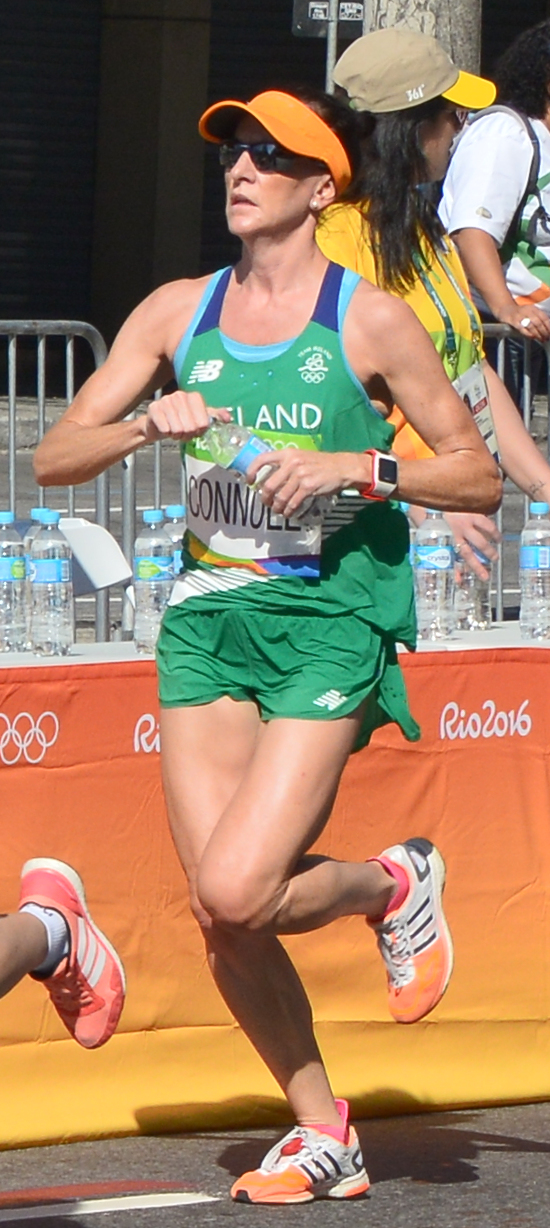
- Connolly at the 2016 Olympics

Personal information
- National team: Ireland
- Height: 163 cm (5 ft 4 in)
- Weight: 54 kg (119 lb)

Sport
- Country: Ireland
- Sport: Athletics
- Event: Marathon
- Club: North Belfast Harriers

Achievements and titles
- Personal best: 2:37:29 (2015)

Breege Connolly (born 1 February 1978) is an Irish marathon runner. She placed 76th at the 2016 Olympics in a time of 2:44:41.

Connolly took up athletics around 2005. Her cousin Teresa Doherty is a former cross country running competitor.
