= 2014 IAAF World Half Marathon Championships =

- Organisers: IAAF
- Edition: 21st
- Date: March 29
- Host city: Copenhagen, Denmark
- Events: 2
- Participation: 201 athletes from 56 nations

The 2014 IAAF World Half Marathon Championships took place on March 29, 2014. The races were held in Copenhagen, Denmark. The essentially flat one-loop course began and ended in the city centre by Christiansborg Castle. Detailed reports on the event and an appraisal of the results were given both for the men's race and the women's race.

Complete results were published for the men's, and the women's individual races, as well as the men's, and women's team races.

== Medallists ==
Event	Gold		Silver		Bronze	
Individual
Men	Geoffrey Kipsang Kamworor (KEN)	59:08	Samuel Tsegay (ERI)	59:21	Guye Adola (ETH)	59:21
Women	Gladys Cherono (KEN)	1:07:29	Mary Wacera Ngugi (KEN)	1:07:44	Selly Chepyego Kaptich (KEN)	1:07:52
Team
Men	Eritrea	2:58:59	Kenya	2:59:38	Ethiopia	3:00:48
Women	Kenya	3:23:05	Ethiopia	3:27:05	Japan	3:31:33

== Race results ==
=== Men's ===
Rank	Athlete	Nationality	Time	Notes
1st place, gold medalist(s)	Geoffrey Kipsang Kamworor	Kenya	59:08	WL
2nd place, silver medalist(s)	Samuel Tsegay	Eritrea	59:21	PB
3rd place, bronze medalist(s)	Guye Adola	Ethiopia	59:21	PB
4	Zersenay Tadese	Eritrea	59:38	SB
5	Nguse Amlosom	Eritrea	1:00:00	
6	Wilson Kiprop	Kenya	1:00:01	
7	Ghirmay Ghebreslassie	Eritrea	1:00:10	SB
8	Samsom Gebreyohannes	Eritrea	1:00:13	PB
9	Adugna Tekele	Ethiopia	1:00:15	PB
10	Kenneth Kiprop Kipkemoi	Kenya	1:00:29	SB
11	Geofrey Kusuro	Uganda	1:00:41	PB
12	Stephen Mokoka	South Africa	1:00:47	PB
13	Elroy Gelant	South Africa	1:01:10	PB
14	Bonsa Dida	Ethiopia	1:01:12	PB
15	Lusapho April	South Africa	1:01:16	PB
16	Polat Kemboi Arıkan	Turkey	1:01:22	NR
17	Ayad Lamdassem	Spain	1:01:22	PB
18	Masato Kikuchi	Japan	1:01:23	
19	Fikre Assefa	Ethiopia	1:01:30	PB
20	El Hassane Ben Lkhainouch	France	1:01:31	PB
21	Josphat Boit	United States	1:01:33	PB
22	Simon Cheprot	Kenya	1:01:37	
23	Isaac Korir	Bahrain	1:01:40	PB
24	Robert Kwemoi Chemosin	Kenya	1:01:43	
25	Alemu Bekele	Bahrain	1:01:46	PB
26	Daniel Rotich	Uganda	1:01:56	SB
27	Daniele Meucci	Italy	1:01:57	SB
28	Shogo Nakamura	Japan	1:01:57	PB
29	Moses Kibet	Uganda	1:02:02	PB
30	Paul Pollock	Ireland	1:02:10	PB
31	James Kibocha Theuri	France	1:02:11	SB
32	Wissem Hosni	Tunisia	1:02:11	SB
33	Tyler Pennel	United States	1:02:20	
34	Abdi Hakin Ulad	Denmark	1:02:24	PB
35	Matt Llano	United States	1:02:25	
36	Hiroto Inoue	Japan	1:02:25	
37	José Antonio Uribe	Mexico	1:02:26	PB
38	Javier Guerra	Spain	1:02:27	PB
39	Shadrack Kiptoo Biwott	United States	1:02:28	
40	Mikael Ekvall	Sweden	1:02:29	NR
41	Félicien Muhitira	Rwanda	1:02:31	PB
42	Raouf Boubaker	Tunisia	1:02:41	PB
43	Bekir Karayel	Turkey	1:02:48	PB
44	Urige Buta	Norway	1:02:50	SB
45	Simone Gariboldi	Italy	1:02:51	PB
46	Fernando Cabada Jr	United States	1:02:54	
47	Alexis Nizeyimana	Rwanda	1:02:55	SB
48	Abdullah Abdulaziz Aljoud	Saudi Arabia	1:02:58	NR
49	Oscar Cerón	Mexico	1:02:58	PB
50	Aweke Ayalew	Bahrain	1:03:01	PB
51	Bilisuma Shugi	Bahrain	1:03:02	PB
52	Juan Carlos Romero	Mexico	1:03:10	
53	Sohta Hoshi	Japan	1:03:29	
54	Abdellatif Meftah	France	1:03:46	SB
55	Felix Ntirenganya	Rwanda	1:03:48	PB
56	Kenta Murayama	Japan	1:03:52	
57	Marius Ionescu	Romania	1:03:54	SB
58	Isaac Ayeko	Uganda	1:03:56	
59	Asbjørn Ellefsen Persen	Norway	1:03:56	PB
60	Gianmarco Buttazzo	Italy	1:03:59	
61	Lars Budolfsen	Denmark	1:04:00	PB
62	Jesper Faurschou	Denmark	1:04:01	PB
63	Nicolae Alexandru Soare	Romania	1:04:07	PB
64	Ben Moreau	Great Britain	1:04:09	SB
65	Jesús Antonio Núñez	Spain	1:04:12	PB
66	Brihun Wuve	Israel	1:04:37	PB
67	Mehmet Çağlayan	Turkey	1:04:54	SB
68	Ruben Iindongo	France	1:04:59	SB
69	Driss El Himer	France	1:05:00	SB
70	Janis Girgensons	Latvia	1:05:11	PB
71	Hussein Habumugisha	Rwanda	1:05:11	SB
72	Kári Steinn Karlsson	Iceland	1:05:13	NR
73	Roman Fosti	Estonia	1:05:14	PB
74	Øystein Sylta	Norway	1:05:19	SB
75	Anuradha Cooray	Sri Lanka	1:05:20	NR
76	Fatih Bilgiç	Turkey	1:05:26	SB
77	Demsew Zegeye	Israel	1:05:27	PB
78	Raúl Pacheco	Peru	1:05:30	
79	Maksim Pankratau	Belarus	1:05:32	SB
80	Zelalem Bacha	Bahrain	1:05:47	PB
81	Luis Alberto Orta	Venezuela	1:05:47	SB
82	Dmytro Siruk	Ukraine	1:05:57	PB
83	Zohar Zimro	Israel	1:06:04	PB
84	César Lizano	Costa Rica	1:06:07	SB
85	Cristhian Pacheco	Peru	1:06:07	PB
86	Yimharan Yosef	Israel	1:06:29	PB
87	Ben Ashkettle	New Zealand	1:06:39	SB
88	Juraj Vitko	Slovakia	1:06:48	
89	Jarkko Järvenpää	Finland	1:07:04	SB
90	El Akhdar Hachani	Tunisia	1:08:06	SB
91	Yolo Nikolov	Bulgaria	1:08:09	PB
92	Martín Cuestas	Uruguay	1:08:12	SB
93	Rui Yong Soh	Singapore	1:08:19	PB
94	Rafael Iglesias	Spain	1:08:29	
95	Thijs Nijhuis	Denmark	1:08:38	SB
96	Asrat Mamo	Israel	1:08:53	PB
97	Mert Girmalegesse	Turkey	1:09:16	
98	Arnar Pétursson	Iceland	1:09:45	PB
99	Andrew Grech	Malta	1:10:10	NR
100	Ortik Ramazonov	Uzbekistan	1:10:14	PB
101	Mok Ying Ren	Singapore	1:10:16	SB
102	Johannes Naitembu	Namibia	1:10:27	SB
103	Arturs Bareikis	Latvia	1:11:03	SB
104	Khasan Gaforov	Tajikistan	1:11:21	
105	Marcel Tschopp	Liechtenstein	1:11:25	SB
106	Kokan Ajanovski	Macedonia	1:12:01	NR
107	Ilir Kellezi	Albania	1:15:00	SB
108	Chan Kit Chan	Macau	1:19:24	SB
109	Chang Chia-Che	Chinese Taipei	1:54:51	SB
—	Ingvar Hjartarson	Iceland	DNF	
—	Ilja Nikolajev	Estonia	DNF	
—	Henrik Them	Denmark	DNF	
—	Tebalu Zawude	Ethiopia	DNF	

=== Women's ===
Rank	Athlete	Nationality	Time	Notes
1st place, gold medalist(s)	Gladys Cherono	Kenya	1:07:29	SB
2nd place, silver medalist(s)	Mary Wacera Ngugi	Kenya	1:07:44	PB
3rd place, bronze medalist(s)	Selly Chepyego Kaptich	Kenya	1:07:52	PB
4	Lucy Wangui Kabuu	Kenya	1:08:37	SB
5	Mercy Jerotich Kibarus	Kenya	1:08:42	SB
6	Netsanet Gudeta	Ethiopia	1:08:46	PB
7	Christelle Daunay	France	1:08:48	SB
8	Valeria Straneo	Italy	1:08:55	SB
9	Tsehay Desalegn	Ethiopia	1:09:04	PB
10	Genet Yalew	Ethiopia	1:09:15	PB
11	Krisztina Papp	Hungary	1:10:08	
12	Mame Feyisa	Ethiopia	1:10:08	PB
13	Annie Bersagel	United States	1:10:10	PB
14	Lauren Kleppin	United States	1:10:16	PB
15	Sayo Nomura	Japan	1:10:18	SB
16	Hirut Alemayehu	Ethiopia	1:10:25	PB
17	Risa Takenaka	Japan	1:10:30	
18	Alyson Dixon	Great Britain	1:10:38	PB
19	Reia Iwade	Japan	1:10:45	SB
20	Karoline Bjerkeli Grøvdal	Norway	1:10:53	SB
21	Alessandra Aguilar	Spain	1:10:56	PB
22	Veronica Inglese	Italy	1:10:57	PB
23	Lisa Christina Stublić	Croatia	1:11:09	
24	Chieko Kido	Japan	1:11:17	
25	Souad Aït Salem	Algeria	1:11:23	
26	Gladys Tejeda	Peru	1:11:24	NR
27	René Kalmer	South Africa	1:11:53	SB
28	Jia Chaofeng	China	1:11:59	
29	Nadia Ejjafini	Italy	1:12:05	SB
30	Alexandra Louison	France	1:12:06	PB
31	Letekidan Gebreaman	Eritrea	1:12:13	PB
32	Isabellah Andersson	Sweden	1:12:16	SB
33	He Yinli	China	1:12:18	
34	Clara Santucci	United States	1:12:22	PB
35	Barkahoum Drici	Algeria	1:12:34	
36	Mattie Suver	United States	1:12:42	SB
37	Luula Berhane	Eritrea	1:12:45	PB
38	Fatna Maraoui	Italy	1:12:50	SB
39	Jessica Draskau-Petersson	Denmark	1:12:52	PB
40	Susan Partridge	Great Britain	1:13:16	
41	Verónica Pérez	Spain	1:13:26	PB
42	Zhang Yingying	China	1:13:26	
43	Linet Chebet	Uganda	1:13:28	PB
44	Wendy Thomas	United States	1:14:07	
45	Leila Luik	Estonia	1:14:18	SB
46	Liina Luik	Estonia	1:14:18	PB
47	Jenna Leigh Challenor	South Africa	1:14:20	PB
48	Rina Yamazaki	Japan	1:14:20	
49	Veronika Brennhovd Blom	Norway	1:14:22	PB
50	Zhang Meixia	China	1:14:24	
51	Lena Eliasson	Sweden	1:14:28	PB
52	Lavinia Haitope	Namibia	1:14:42	PB
54	Soumaya Boussaïd	Tunisia	1:15:12	NR
55	Corinne Herbreteau	France	1:15:27	
56	Yue Chao	China	1:15:53	
57	Rocío Cántara	Peru	1:15:54	PB
58	Elvan Abeylegesse	Turkey	1:15:58	SB
59	Louise Langelund Batting	Denmark	1:16:18	PB
60	Nicolasa Condori	Peru	1:16:35	SB
61	Luminita Georgiana Achim	Romania	1:16:45	PB
62	Bahar Doğan	Turkey	1:17:00	
63	Nebiat Habtemariam	Eritrea	1:17:00	SB
64	Volha Krautsova	Belarus	1:17:05	SB
65	Anne Holm Baumeister	Denmark	1:17:06	SB
66	Cornelia Joubert	South Africa	1:17:10	SB
67	Simone Christensen Glad	Denmark	1:17:11	PB
68	Marthe Katrine Myhre	Norway	1:17:28	
69	Aline Camboulives	France	1:17:46	SB
70	Liliana Maria Danci	Romania	1:18:03	SB
71	Tonya Nero	Trinidad and Tobago	1:18:26	SB
72	Annemette Aagaard	Denmark	1:18:48	SB
73	Nilay Esen	Turkey	1:19:08	
74	Claudia Paula Todoran	Romania	1:19:10	
75	Gabriela Traña	Costa Rica	1:19:25	SB
76	Arndi Háfdórsdóttir	Iceland	1:20:02	PB
77	Yiu Kit Ching	Hong Kong	1:20:28	PB
78	Kateryna Karmanenko	Ukraine	1:20:53	SB
79	Elena Moaga	Romania	1:22:45	SB
80	Giselle Camilleri	Malta	1:23:41	
81	Irina Moroz	Uzbekistan	1:23:46	PB
82	Martha Ernstsdóttir	Iceland	1:24:24	SB
83	Sandrine Kengue	Gabon	1:24:37	SB
84	Helen Olafsdóttir	Iceland	1:24:41	SB
85	Carlie Pipe	Barbados	1:32:58	NR
86	Kathrin Gassner	Liechtenstein	1:36:13	PB
87	Pou I Chan	Macau	1:36:35	PB
88	Shamha Ahmed	Maldives	1:42:04	NR
—	Vesna Kiradzieva	Macedonia	DNF	
—	Nicola Duncan	Ireland	DNS	

== Team results ==
=== Men's ===
Rank	Country	Athletes	Time
1	Eritrea	Samuel Tsegay; Zersenay Tadese; Nguse Amlosom	2:58:59
2	Kenya	Geoffrey Kipsang Kamworor; Wilson Kiprop; Kenneth Kiprop Kipkemoi	2:59:38
3	Ethiopia	Guye Adola; Adugna Tekele; Bonsa Dida	3:00:48
4	South Africa	Stephen Mokoka; Elroy Gelant; Lusapho April	3:03:13
5	Uganda	Geofrey Kusuro; Daniel Rotich; Moses Kibet	3:04:39
6	Japan	Masato Kikuchi; Shogo Nakamura; Hiroto Inoue	3:05:45
7	United States	Josphat Boit; Tyler Pennel; Matt Llano	3:06:18
8	Bahrain	Isaac Korir; Alemu Bekele; Aweke Ayalew	3:06:27
9	France	El Hassane Ben Lkhainouch; James Kibocha Theuri; Abdellatif Meftah	3:07:28
10	Spain	Ayad Lamdassem; Javier Guerra; Jesús Antonio Núñez	3:08:01
11	Mexico	José Antonio Uribe; Oscar Cerón; Juan Carlos Romero	3:08:34
12	Italy	Daniele Meucci; Simone Gariboldi; Gianmarco Buttazzo	3:08:47
13	Turkey	Polat Kemboi Arıkan; Bekir Karayel; Mehmet Çağlayan	3:09:04
14	Rwanda	Félicien Muhitira; Alexis Nizeyimana; Felix Ntirenganya	3:09:14
15	Denmark	Abdi Hakin Ulad; Lars Budolfsen; Jesper Faurschou	3:10:25
16	Norway	Urige Buta; Asbjørn Ellefsen Persen; Øystein Sylta	3:12:05
17	Tunisia	Wissem Hosni; Raouf Boubaker; El Akhdar Hachani	3:12:58
18	Israel	Brihun Wuve; Demsew Zegeye; Zohar Zimro	3:16:08

=== Women's ===
Rank	Country	Athletes	Time
1	Kenya	Gladys Cherono; Mary Wacera Ngugi; Selly Chepyego Kaptich	3:23:05
2	Ethiopia	Netsanet Gudeta; Tsehay Desalegn; Genet Yalew	3:27:05
3	Japan	Sayo Nomura; Risa Takenaka; Reia Iwade	3:31:33
4	Italy	Valeria Straneo; Veronica Inglese; Nadia Ejjafini	3:31:57
5	United States	Annie Bersagel; Lauren Kleppin; Clara Santucci	3:32:48
6	France	Christelle Daunay; Alexandra Louison; Corinne Herbreteau	3:36:21
7	China	Jia Chaofeng; He Yinli; Zhang Yingying	3:37:43
8	Eritrea	Letekidan Gebreaman; Luula Berhane; Nebiat Habtemariam	3:41:58
9	Norway	Karoline Bjerkeli Grøvdal; Veronika Brennhovd Blom; Marthe Katrine Myhre	3:42:43
10	South Africa	René Kalmer; Jenna Leigh Challenor; Cornelia Joubert	3:43:23
11	Peru	Gladys Tejeda; Rocío Cántara; Nicolasa Condori	3:43:53
12	Denmark	Jessica Draskau-Petersson; Louise Langelund Batting; Anne Holm Baumeister	3:46:16
13	Turkey	Elvan Abeylegesse; Bahar Doğan; Nilay Esen	3:52:06
14	Romania	Luminita Georgiana Achim; Liliana Maria Danci; Claudia Paula Todoran	3:53:58
15	Iceland	Arndi Háfdórsdóttir; Martha Ernstsdóttir; Helen Olafsdóttir	4:09:07

== Medal table (unofficial) ==
Rank	Nation	Gold	Silver	Bronze	Total
1	Kenya	3	2	1	6
2	Eritrea	1	1	0	2
3	Ethiopia	0	1	2	3
4	Japan	0	0	1	1
Totals (4 entries)		4	4	4	12

== Participation ==
An unofficial count yields the participation of 201 athletes from 56 countries. Although announced, the athletes from Canada and Palestine did not show.

- Albania (1)
- Algeria (2)
- Bahrain (5)
- Barbados (1)
- Belarus (2)
- Bulgaria (1)
- China (5)
- Chinese Taipei (1)
- Costa Rica (2)
- Croatia (1)
- Denmark (10)
- Eritrea (8)
- Estonia (4)
- Ethiopia (10)
- Finland (1)
- France (9)
- Gabon (1)
- Hong Kong (1)
- Hungary (1)
- Iceland (6)
- Ireland (1)
- Israel (5)
- Italy (7)
- Japan (10)
- Kenya (10)
- Latvia (2)
- Liechtenstein (2)
- Macau (2)
- Macedonia (2)
- Maldives (1)
- Malta (2)
- Mexico (3)
- Namibia (2)
- New Zealand (1)
- Norway (6)
- Peru (5)
- Romania (6)
- Rwanda (4)
- Saudi Arabia (1)
- Singapore (2)
- Slovakia (1)
- South Africa (6)
- Spain (6)
- Sri Lanka (1)
- Sweden (3)
- Tajikistan (1)
- Trinidad and Tobago (1)
- Tunisia (4)
- Turkey (8)
- Uganda (5)
- Ukraine (2)
- United Kingdom (3)
- United States (10)
- Uruguay (1)
- Uzbekistan (2)
- Venezuela (1)

== See also ==
- 2014 in athletics (track and field)
