= Jared Ward =

American long-distance runner

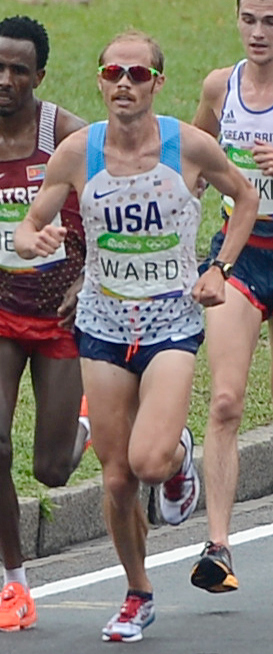
- Ward at the 2016 Summer Olympics

Personal information
- Born: September 9, 1988 (age 38) Layton, Utah, US
- Height: 5 ft 9 in (175 cm)
- Weight: 135 lb (61 kg)

Sport
- Events: Mile, 5000 meters, 10,000 meters, marathon
- College team: BYU
- Turned pro: 2014

Achievements and titles
- Personal bests: 5000 meters: 13:34.74; 10,000 meters: 28:36.15; Half marathon: 1:01:42; Marathon: 2:09:25

Jared Ward (born September 9, 1988) is an American long-distance runner. He qualified for the 2016 Summer Olympics when he placed third in the marathon at the 2016 US Olympic Trials. He finished sixth at the 2016 Olympics.

== Early life, family and education ==
Jared Ward was born in Layton, Utah and attended Davis High School. His sister Anna and her husband are also competitive runners.

Ward has a master's degree in statistics from Brigham Young University.

== Career ==
In addition to his athletic career, Ward teaches statistics at BYU as a member of the adjunct faculty.

== Running career ==
=== Collegiate ===
While in college, Ward ran for the BYU Cougars. While at BYU, Ward ran in the NCAA Cross Country Nationals in each of his four seasons. Ward's peak came during his junior season when he finished 8th at Pre-Nationals, 1st at the West Coast Conference Championships, 3rd at the NCAA Mountain Region Championships, and 14th at the 2012 NCAA Division I Cross Country Championships. Following his BYU career, Ward signed with Saucony.

=== Professional ===
Ward was the runner-up at the 2014 U.S. Marathon championships. At the 2015 USATF 25 km Championships Ward finished 1st defeating Matt Llano, Christo Landry, Abdi Abdirahman, Augustus Maiyo, and Brett Gotcher. At the 2015 USATF 20 km Championships Ward finished 1st defeating Dathan Ritzenhein, Luke Puskedra, Tyler Pennel, Abdi Abdirahman, and Fernando Cabada. Ward is also the 2015 U.S. Marathon champion. These three victories helped him secure the USATF Running Circuit title for 2015.

On February 13, 2016 Ward finished third, behind Galen Rupp and Meb Keflezighi at the US Olympic Marathon Trials in Los Angeles, California, to secure a place on the 2016 US Olympic Team, finishing in 2:13:00 on a warm day. On August 21, 2016 Ward finished 6th, with Galen Rupp in 3rd and Meb Keflezighi in 33rd, at the Olympic Marathon in Rio de Janeiro, Brazil, running a personal best time of 2:11:30 with the temperature in the 70s on a drizzly, humid morning.

== Personal life ==
Ward and his wife Erica have six children. They reside in Provo, Utah.

Ward is a member of the Church of Jesus Christ of Latter-day Saints. He served a two-year mission to Pittsburgh, Pennsylvania.

=== Competition record ===
Year	Competition	Venue	Position	Event	Notes
Representing the United States
2013	Chicago Marathon	Chicago, Illinois	19th	Marathon	2:16:17
2014	Twin Cities Marathon	Minneapolis-Saint Paul, Minnesota	2nd	Marathon	2:14:00
2015	USA Marathon Championships; Los Angeles Marathon	Los Angeles, California	3rd	Marathon	2:12:56
2016	US Olympic Trials	Los Angeles, California	3rd	Marathon	2:13:00
2016	IAAF World Half Marathon Championships	Cardiff, Wales	26th	Half-Marathon	64:05
2016	Olympic Marathon	Rio de Janeiro, Brazil	6th	Marathon	2:11:30
2017	New York City Half Marathon	New York City, New York	14th	Half-Marathon	1:03:14
2017	Boston Marathon	Boston, Massachusetts	10th	Marathon	2:15:28
2017	Rock 'n' Roll Philadelphia Half Marathon	Philadelphia, Pennsylvania	5th	Half-Marathon	1:04:43
2017	New York City Marathon	New York City, New York	12th	Marathon	2:18:39
2018	Houston Half-Marathon	Houston, Texas	16th	Half-Marathon	1:02:10
2018	2018 IAAF World Half Marathon Championships	Valencia, Spain	83rd	Half-Marathon	1:04:49
2018	New York City Marathon	New York City, New York	6th	Marathon	2:12:24
2019	Boston Marathon	Boston, Massachusetts	8th	Marathon	2:09:25
2019	New York City Marathon	New York City, New York	6th	Marathon	2:10:45
2020	Houston Half-Marathon	Houston, Texas	11th	Half-Marathon	1:01:36
2020	US Olympic Trials	Atlanta, Georgia	27th	Marathon	2:15:55
2020	London Marathon	London, England	17th	Marathon	2:12:38
2021	New York City Marathon	New York City, New York	10th	Marathon	2:14:06
2022	Boston Marathon	Boston, Massachusetts	26th	Marathon	2:15:24

=== USA National Championships ===
==== Road ====
Year	Competition	Venue	Position	Event	Notes
2015	USA Half Marathon Championships	Houston, Texas	2nd	Half marathon	1:01:42
2015	USA Marathon Championships; Los Angeles Marathon	Los Angeles, California	1st	Marathon	2:12:56
2015	USA 25 km Championships	Grand Rapids, Michigan	1st	25 km	1:14:56
2015	USA 20 km Championships	New Haven, Connecticut	1st	20 km	59:24
2016	US Olympic Trials	Los Angeles, California	3rd	Marathon	2:13:00
2016	USA 25 km Championships	Grand Rapids, Michigan	2nd	25 km	1:15:44
2018	USA 15 km Championships; Gate River Run	Jacksonville, Florida	13th	15 km	46:18
2018	USA 10 km Championships; Peachtree Road Race	Atlanta Georgia	18th	10 km	30:07
2021	USA 20 km Championships	New Haven, Connecticut	16th	20 km	1:01:21

=== NCAA championships ===
Year	Competition	Venue	Position	Notes
Representing BYU
2010	NCAA Cross Country Championships	Terre Haute, Indiana	151st	31:35.5
2011	NCAA Men's Division I Outdoor Track and Field Championships	Drake University	49th 10 km	29:56.95
2011	NCAA Cross Country Championships	Terre Haute, Indiana	58th	30:27.8
2012	NCAA Men's Division I Outdoor Track and Field Championships	Drake University	5th 10 km	28:59.74
2012	NCAA Cross Country Championships	Louisville, Kentucky	14th	29:33.4
2013	2013 NCAA Division I Indoor Track and Field Championships	University of Arkansas	9th 5 km	13:54.04
2013	IC4A / Eastern College Athletic Conference	Princeton University	1st 5 km	13:59.56
2013	NCAA Men's Division I Outdoor Track and Field Championships	University of Oregon	8th 10 km	29:51.59
2013	NCAA Men's Division I Outdoor Track and Field Championships	University of Oregon	33rd 5 km	14:15.35
2013	NCAA Cross Country Championships	Terre Haute, Indiana	36th	30:43.6
2014	2014 NCAA Division I Indoor Track and Field Championships	University of New Mexico	4th 5 km	13:54.04
2014	2014 NCAA Division I Indoor Track and Field Championships	University of New Mexico	4th 3 km	8:13.73
2014	2014 NCAA Division I Outdoor Track and Field Championships	University of Oregon	10 km	DNF
