= List of Barbadian records in athletics =

The following are the national records in athletics in Barbados maintained by its national athletics federation: Athletics Association of Barbados (AAB).

== Outdoor ==
Key to tables: Awaiting ratification Record not kept by AAB Not ratified or later rescinded by AAB

=== Men ===
Event	Record	Athlete	Date	Meet	Place	Ref.
100 y	9.42+ (−0.4 m/s)	Ramon Gittens	20 May 2016	Golden Spike Ostrava	Ostrava, Czech Republic	
100 m	9.87 (−0.2 m/s)	Obadele Thompson	11 September 1998	World Cup	Johannesburg, South Africa	
200 m	19.97 (−0.9 m/s)	Obadele Thompson	9 September 2000		Yokohama, Japan	
400 m	44.43	Jonathan Jones	15 May 2022	Big 12 Conference Championships	Lubbock, United States	
800 m	1:45.83	Jonathan Jones	24 March 2022	Texas Relays	Austin, United States	
1500 m	3:47.82	Leo Garnes	4 April 1991	Texas Relays	Austin, United States	
3000 m	8:33.97	Kenrick Sealy	16 May 1998		Palo Alto, United States	
5000 m	14:20.2	Leo Garnes	5 June 1992		Bridgetown, Barbados	
10,000 m	30:44.30	Leo Garnes	22 April 1993		Albany, United States	
Marathon	2:29:40	Reuben McColin	4 December 1988		Bridgetown, Barbados	
110 m hurdles	13.14 (+0.1 m/s)	Ryan Brathwaite	20 August 2009	World Championships	Berlin, Germany	
110 m hurdles	13.14 (±0.0 m/s)	Ryan Brathwaite	6 July 2013	Meeting Areva	Saint-Denis, France	
400 m hurdles	48.79	Rasheeme Griffith	9 May 2024	SEC Championships	Gainesville, United States	
3000 m steeplechase	9:07.3	Leo Garnes	7 June 1992		Bridgetown, Barbados	
High jump	2.25 m	Henderson Dottin	12 April 2008		El Paso, United States	
Pole vault	3.70 m	Clifford Brooks	13 August 1977		London, United Kingdom	
Pole vault	3.70 m	Victor Houston	7 April 1994	Texas Relays	Austin, United States	
Pole vault	4.49 m	Aaron Worrell	18 March 2023	Ross and Sharon Irwin Meet	San Diego, United States	
Pole vault	4.50 m (Note: record set during decathlon competition)	Aaron Worrell	14 April 2023	Bryan Clay Invitational	Azusa, United States	
Long jump	7.88 m (+1.0 m/s)	Charles Greaves	24 May 2018	NCAA Division II Championships	Charlotte, United States	
Triple jump	16.70 m	Alvin Haynes	17 May 1992		Starkville United States	
Shot put	19.05 m	Triston Gibbons	15 May 2021	AAC Championships	Tampa, United States	
Discus throw	55.64 m	Triston Gibbons	18 March 2021	Cougar Spring Break	Houston, United States	
Hammer throw	49.82 m	Dequan Lovell	31 March 2017		San Marcos, United States	
Hammer throw	52.04 m	Dequan Lovell	8 April 2017	SBU Bearcat Invitational	Bolivar, United States	
Hammer throw	54.68 m (Note: not ratified by AAB but recognised by World Athletics)	Dequan Lovell	4 May 2018	GMAC Championships	Hillsdale, United States	
Javelin throw	78.71 m	Janeil Craigg	8 April 2017	Grenada Invitational	St. George's, Grenada	
Decathlon	7777 pts	Victor Houston	5–6 August 1997	World Championships	Athens, Greece	
Decathlon	100m / Long jump / Shot put / High jump / 400m / 110m H / Discus / Pole vault / Javelin / 1500m; 10.72 (+0.2 m/s) / 7.57 m (+0.3 m/s) / 12.82 m / 2.03 m / 47.91 / 13.92 (+0.8 m/s) / 33.56 m / 3.50 m / 62.10 m / 4:32.30					
20 km walk (road)	1:43:25	Eon Mitchell	25 June 1999		Bridgetown, Barbados	
50 km walk (road)						
4 × 100 m relay	38.41	Barbados; Shane Brathwaite; Mario Burke; Burkheart Ellis; Jaquone Hoyte	2 August 2018	CAC Games	Barranquilla, Colombia	
4 × 200 m relay	1:21.88	Barbados; Ramon Gittens; Levi Cadogan; Andrew Hinds; Fallon Forde	24 May 2014	IAAF World Relays	Nassau, Bahamas	
4 × 400 m relay	3:01.60	Barbados; Richard Louis; David Peltier; Clyde Edwards; Elvis Forde	11 August 1984	Olympic Games	Los Angeles, United States	

=== Women ===
Event	Record	Athlete	Date	Meet	Place	Ref.
100 m	11.14 (+2.0 m/s)	Tristan Evelyn	16 May 2021	AAC Championships	Tampa, United States	
200 m	22.61 (+1.6 m/s)	Sada Williams	18 March 2016	Powerade Secondary Schools' Championships	Bridgetown, Barbados	
400 m	49.58	Sada Williams	21 August 2023	World Championships	Budapest, Hungary	
800 m	2:02.23	Sade Sealy	7 August 2019	Pan American Games	Lima, Peru	
1500 m	4:25.61	Sade Sealy	22 February 2020	Louis Lynch Championships	Bridgetown, Barbados	
3000 m	10:36.37	Layla Haynes	23 February 2020	Louis Lynch Championships	Bridgetown, Barbados	
3000 m	10:18.48	Elizabeth Williams	27 March 2016	CARIFTA Games	St. George's, Grenada	
3000 m	10:16.07 (Note: not ratified by AAB but recognised by World Athletics)	Carlie Pipe	20 February 2020		Bridgetown, Barbados	
5000 m	18:40.00	Yvette Mayers	17 April 1998		New Orleans, United States	
10,000 m						
Half marathon	1:32:58	Carlie Pipe	29 March 2014	World Half Marathon Championships	Copenhagen, Denmark	
Marathon	3:06:07	Caroline Moorat	7 June 1987		Port of Spain, Trinidad and Tobago	
100 m hurdles	12.88 (−1.0 m/s)	Kierre Beckles	27 August 2015	World Championships	Beijing, China	
200 m hurdles (straight)	26.48 (−0.2 m/s)	Kierre Beckles	4 June 2017	Boost Boston Games	Boston, United States	
400 m hurdles	53.36	Andrea Blackett	25 August 1999	World Championships	Seville, Spain	
3000 m steeplechase						
High jump	1.95 m	Akela Jones	13 April 2016	Mt. SAC Relays	Azusa, United States	
Pole vault						
Long jump	6.80 m (+0.2 m/s)	Akela Jones	29 May 2021	Chula Vista Field Festival	Chula Vista, United States	
Triple jump	13.35 m (+0.2 m/s)	Seidre Forde	4 April 2008	Texas Relays	Austin, United States	
Shot put	17.14 m	Shernelle Nicholls	13 May 2007		Lincoln, United States	
Discus throw	52.00 m	Shernelle Nicholls	29 March 2008		Columbia United States	
Hammer throw	58.21 m	Shernelle Nicholls	19 April 2007		Lawrence, United States	
Javelin throw	47.00 m	Deandra Dottin	24 March 2008	CARIFTA Games	Basseterre, Saint Kitts and Nevis	
Heptathlon	6371 pts	Akela Jones	10–11 June 2015	NCAA Division I Championships	Eugene, United States	
Heptathlon	100m H / High jump / Shot put / 200m / Long jump / Javelin / 800m; 13.10 (+0.9 m/s) / 1.84 m / 14.85 m / 23.45w (+3.2 m/s) / 6.53 m w (+3.3 m/s) / 38.13 m / 2:29.43					
20 km walk (road)						
50 km walk (road)						
4 × 100 m relay	44.34	Barbados; Lyn-Marie Cox; Genna Williams; Jade Bailey; Luan Weekes	1 August 2004		Sherbrooke, Canada	
4 × 400 m relay	3:30.72	Barbados; Joanne Durant; Andrea Blackett; Melissa Straker; Tanya Oxley	30 July 1999	Pan American Games	Winnipeg, Canada	

=== Mixed ===
Event	Record	Athlete	Date	Meet	Place	Ref.
4 × 400 m relay	3:20.80	Barbados; Desean Boyce; Sakena Massiah; Raheem Taitt-Best; Tia-Adana Belle	16 August 2025	NACAC Championships	Freeport, Bahamas	

== Indoor ==
=== Men ===
Event	Record	Athlete	Date	Meet	Place	Ref.
55 m	5.99 A ^{[WB]}	Obadele Thompson	22 February 1997		Colorado Springs, United States	
60 m	6.51	Ramon Gittens	18 March 2016	World Championships	Portland, United States	
200 m	20.26	Obadele Thompson	6 March 1999	World Championships	Maebashi, Japan	
400 m	45.38	Jonathan Jones	9 February 2019	Texas Tech Shootout	Lubbock, United States	
600 y	1:06.68 OT	Jonathan Jones	26 February 2022	Big 12 Championships	Ames, United States	
600 m	1:15.12 A	Jonathan Jones	4 February 2022	New Mexico Collegiate Classic	Albuquerque, United States	
800 m	1:49.09	Ronald Thorne	4 February 1995		Fairfax, United States	
1000 m	2:29.86 OT	Presley Cherubin	26 January 2002		Ames, United States	
1500 m						
3000 m						
55 m hurdles	7.15	Shane Brathwaite	12 January 2013	Texas Tech Open	Lubbock, United States	
60 m hurdles	7.54	Greggmar Swift	14 February 2015	Millrose Games	New York City, United States	
High jump	2.23 m	Henderson Dottin	28 February 2003		Nampa, United States	
Pole vault	3.60 m	Clifford Brooks	8 January 1977		London, United Kingdom	
Pole vault	3.71 m (Note: record set during heptathlon competition)	Aaron Worrell	5 February 2022	Bearcat Invite	Maryville, United States	
Pole vault	3.91 m (Note: record set during heptathlon competition)	Aaron Worrell	5 February 2022	Bearcat Invite	Maryville, United States	
Pole vault	4.01 m (Note: record set during heptathlon competition)	Aaron Worrell	5 February 2022	Bearcat Invite	Maryville, United States	
Pole vault	4.55 m (Note: record set during heptathlon competition)	Aaron Worrell	11 March 2023	NCAA Division II Championships	Virginia Beach, United States	
Long jump	7.85 m (Note: outdoor mark ratified as absolute record)	Kevin Bartlett	12 January 2002		Joplin, United States	
Triple jump	16.20 m	Alvin Haynes	18 January 1992		Carbondale United States	
Shot put	18.73 m	Triston Gibbons	30 January 2021	H-Town SpeedCity Series II	Houston, United States	
Weight throw	16.46 m	Tristan Whitehall	7 February 2016	University of South Alabama Jaguar Invitational	Birmingham, United States	
Heptathlon	4502 pts h	Clifford Brooks	17–18 February 1979		Cosford, United Kingdom	
Heptathlon	60m / Long jump / Shot put / High jump / 60m H / Pole vault / 1000m; 7.4 / 6.60 m / 12.77 m / 1.75 m / 8.9 / 3.40 m / 2:56.0					
Heptathlon	5604 pts	Aaron Worrell	10–11 March 2023	NCAA Division II Championships	Virginia Beach, United States	
Heptathlon	60m / Long jump / Shot put / High jump / 60m H / Pole vault / 1000m; 7.05 / 7.22 m / 12.48 m / 2.05 m / 8.50 / 4.55 m / 2:51.31					
5000 m walk						
4 × 400 m relay						

=== Women ===
Event	Record	Athlete	Date	Meet	Place	Ref.
60 m	7.29	Ashley Marshall	12 February 2016	Husky Classic	Seattle, United States	
60 m	7.21	Tristan Evelyn	27 January 2023	Indoor Meeting Karlsruhe	Karlsruhe, Germany	
60 m	7.14	Tristan Evelyn	10 February 2023	ISTAF Indoor	Berlin, Germany	
150 m	18.45	Amber Cumberbatch	12 January 2002		Champaign, United States	
200 m	23.16	Tristan Evelyn	29 February 2020	AAC Championships	Birmingham, United States	
300 m	39.31 OT	Althia Maximilien	6 December 2013	ISU Holiday Preview	Ames, United States	
400 m	53.06	Althia Maximilien	1 March 2013	Arkansas Final Qualifier	Fayetteville, United States	
800 m	2:06.5	Lorna Forde	28 January 1977	Millrose Games	New York City, United States	
800 m	2:05.45 OT	Sheena Gooding	14 February 2004		Ames, United States	
800 m	2:05.47 OT	Sonia Gaskin	11 February 2017	Iowa State Classic	Ames, United States	
1500 m						
3000 m						
55 m hurdles	7.55	Kierre Beckles	18 February 2012	Gamecock Invitational	Columbia, United States	
60 m hurdles	8.00	Akela Jones	27 February 2016	Big 12 Championships	Ames, United States	
High jump	1.98 m (Note: record set during pentathlon competition) (Note: outdoor mark ratified as absolute record)	Akela Jones	11 March 2016	NCAA Division I Championships	Birmingham, United States	
Pole vault						
Long jump	6.80 m	Akela Jones	11 March 2016	NCAA Division I Championships	Birmingham, United States	
Long jump	6.80 m	Akela Inatta-Jones	11 February 2022	Tiger Paw Invitational	Clemson, United States	
Triple jump	13.24 m	Seidre Forde	15 March 2008	NCAA Division I Championships	Fayetteville, United States	
Shot put	16.71 m	Shernelle Nicholls	15 March 2008	NCAA Division I Championships	Fayetteville, United States	
Pentathlon	4643 pts	Akela Jones	22 January 2016	DeLoss Dodds Invitational	Manhattan, United States	
Pentathlon	60m H / High jump / Shot put / Long jump / 800m; 8.25 / 1.85 m / 12.99 m / 6.64 m / 2:25.63					
3000 m walk						
4 × 400 m relay						
