= Rancho Verde High School =

Location
- 17750 Lasselle Street; Moreno Valley, California 92551; United States; 33°51′36″N 117°06′58″W

Information
- Type: High School
- Motto: "Respect, Vision, Honor, Scholarship"
- Established: 1991
- School district: Val Verde Unified School District
- Principal: Brunel Merilus
- Teaching staff: 96.39 (FTE)
- Grades: 9-12
- Enrollment: 2,052 (2023–2024)
- Student to teacher ratio: 21.29
- Colors: Red, black and silver
- Athletics conference: CIF Southern Section; Inland Valley League
- Nickname: Mustangs

Rancho Verde High School is one of three comprehensive high schools in the Val Verde Unified School District. The school is situated on 38 acres in the southern section of Moreno Valley, California. Rancho Verde represents a community of diverse social and economic backgrounds containing both suburban and rural populations. As of 2018, the school serves 2,074 students with 24.94 full-time equivalent (FTE) teachers and 83.17 FTE staff.

== History ==
Rancho Verde High School first opened in the fall of 1991. The school was designed to accommodate 1,800 students. Between 2001 and 2003, two phases of new construction added several new buildings and renovated existing buildings on campus. This construction included two science buildings, a music/band building, two multi-story classroom buildings, a football stadium, a second gymnasium, a dance studio, and weight rooms.

== Accomplishments ==
- NAMM Foundation Best Communities in Music Award (2012-2013)
- Dr. Olivier Wong Ah Sun - Western Riverside County Association of School Managers (ACSA)- High School Principal of the Year (2012-2013)
- National Advanced Placement Collegeboard Award as District of the Year (2011-2012)
- National AVID Demonstration School (2011-2014)
- US News Best High Schools Bronze Award (2012)
- CIF State Champions 4 X 100 girls relay (2010)
- Top 15 ranked marching band in southern California, with 4 former students active in the University of California Los Angeles marching band.
- 2017 state and division 1 champions in track and field
- The Rancho Verde High School Crimson Regiment band performed in the 2020 Rose Parade in Pasadena, CA on New Year's Day.

== Sports ==
Rancho Verde High School has a wide range of successful athletic programs.

- Cross Country
- Football (freshman, junior varsity, and varsity)
- Girls Volleyball (freshman, junior varsity, and varsity)
- Boys Volleyball (junior varsity and varsity)
- Girls and Boys Tennis (varsity)
- Boys and Girls Soccer (junior varsity and varsity)
- Boys and Girls Basketball (freshman, junior varsity, and varsity)
- Wrestling (junior varsity and varsity)
- Baseball (junior varsity and varsity)
- Softball (junior varsity and varsity)
- Track and Field (junior varsity and varsity)
- Swim (novice, junior varsity, and varsity)

== Notable alumni ==
- Larry Ned (1997), former NFL running back
- Da'Mon Cromartie-Smith (2005), former NFL safety
- D'Aundre Reed (2006), former NFL defensive end
- Tyron Smith (2008), former NFL All-Pro offensive tackle
- Kwame Alexander (2009), basketball player who plays overseas
- Eric Martin (2009), former NFL linebacker
- Michael Snaer (2009), basketball player who played overseas
- Quincy Enunwa (2010), former NFL wide receiver
- Kyle Fuller (2010), basketball player who plays overseas and The Circle contestant
- Ronald Powell (2010), former NFL linebacker
- Ashley Marshall (2011), track and field athlete who represents Barbados
- Blair Brown (2012), former NFL linebacker
- Dylan Riley (2024), college football running back for the Boise State Broncos
