= Robert Chemosin =

Kenyan long-distance runner (born 1989)

Robert Kwemoi Chemosin (born 1 February 1989) is a Kenyan long-distance runner who competes in half marathons. His personal best for the event is 59:19 minutes. He is managed by Gianni De Madonna.

He first began competing outside of Kenya in 2012. He was the winner of the Udine Half Marathon in a personal best of 60:23 minutes that year, runner-up at the 15 km du Puy-en-Velay and fifth at the Giro al Sas.

He competed extensively over the half marathon the following year. He was runner-up to Wilson Kiprop at the Roma-Ostia Half Marathon in March, running a time of 59:19 minutes which would rank him sixth globally that year. Later that same month he was runner-up at the Stramilano, but his following outings were less successful, finishing outside the top eight in Yangzhou, Lille and Delhi. He acted as a pacemaker for the 2013 Frankfurt Marathon.

Chemosin's strong personal best from 2013 earned him a place for the 2014 IAAF World Half Marathon Championships, but he was the worst performer among the Kenyan team, finishing in 24th place more than two and a half minutes behind fellow Kenyan and race winner Geoffrey Kipsang Kamworor. His best result of the year came again at the Roma-Ostia race where he was fifth in a time of 60:24 minutes. He was again down the rankings at the Luanda Half Marathon, taking twelfth.

In 2015 Chemosin won second place in Warsaw with 2:08:05 to his record and $15,000 in cash. In October of the same year he competed at the Toronto Marathon where he got in fourth with a 2:09:38 run and then became a winner of Rome-Ostia Half Marathon with 59:37 to his credit.

== Personal bests ==
- 10 kilometres – 28:06 (2014)
- 15 kilometres – 42:11 (2013)
- 20 kilometres – 58:27 (2014)
- Half marathon – 59:19 (2013)

== International competitions ==
Year	Competition	Venue	Position	Notes
2014	World Half Marathon Championships	Copenhagen, Denmark	24th	Half marathon
2014	World Half Marathon Championships	Copenhagen, Denmark	1st	Team
