= Ashley Marshall =

Barbadian sprinter

Personal information
- Born: September 10, 1993 (age 32) Los Angeles, California, U.S.
- Height: 1.70 m (5 ft 7 in)
- Weight: 60 kg (132 lb)

Sport
- Country: Barbados
- Events: 60 metres 100 metres 200 metres
- College team: UC Davis Aggies
- Coached by: Rahm Sheffield

Achievements and titles
- Personal bests: 60 meters: 7.29 NR (2016); 100 meters: 11.34 (2013); 200 meters: 23.25 (2013)

Ashley Jasmin Marshall (born September 10, 1993) is an American sprinter who represents Barbados.

== Professional ==
Ashley Marshall set a 60 meters Barbadian records in athletics at University of Washington Huskies invitational in February 2016. Marshall placed 27th in 2016 IAAF World Indoor Championships - Women's 60 metres running 7.38.

== UC Davis ==
Marshall earned three track athlete of the year awards (2013, 2014, 2015) awarded by Big West Conference.

== Prep ==
Marshall is a 2011 alum of Rancho Verde High School. As a senior, Marshall placed 3rd in California Interscholastic Federation state final with a wind-hindered 11.91 in 100 meters. Marshall won 2011 Southern Section title with wind-aided 11.7. In 2010, her 4x100 team earned silver at USATF Junior Olympics.
