= Clara Santucci =

American long-distance runner (b. 1987)

Personal information
- Nationality: American
- Born: March 24, 1987 (age 39) Chicago, Illinois
- Height: 1.65 m (5 ft 5 in)

Sport
- Country: United States
- Sport: Track and field, Road racing
- Event(s): 10 km, Half marathon, 25 km, Marathon
- College team: West Virginia University
- Team
- Turned pro: 2010

Achievements and titles
- Personal bests: 5000 m: 16:01.18 (Palo Alto 2010); 10,000 m: 33:16.96 (Palo Alto 2009); Half marathon: 1:12:22 (København 2014); Marathon: 2:29:54 (Boston 2011)
Medal record
Women's athletics
Representing the United States
World Half Marathon Championships
2014 Copenhagen	Half Marathon

Clara Santucci is an American long-distance runner.

== NCAA ==
Clara Grandt Santucci is a multiple time NCAA Division I All-American at West Virginia Mountaineers track and field.

== Professional ==
Santucci finished 6th at the 2014 Chicago Marathon.

She competed at the 2014 IAAF World Half Marathon Championships.

Santucci also won the 2014 and 2015 Pittsburgh Marathon.
