= Dark Sky Distance =

Distance running group

Dark Sky Distance is a professional distance running team sponsored by Under Armour and based in Flagstaff, Arizona. The team focuses on events ranging from the 1500 meters to the marathon. Athletes on the group represent multiple nationalities.

== History ==
The group was founded in the fall of 2020 with an initial roster of 10 runners. The group is named after the dark night skies found in Flagstaff, due to the city's commitment to reducing light pollution. The training group was founded with Stephen Haas as a head coach.

== Athletes ==
=== Current athletes ===
- Sharon Lokedi
- Neil Gourley
- Kasey Knevelbaard
- Weini Kelati
- Katie Snowden
- Jack Anstey
- Blake Haney
- Eduardo Herrera
- Matt Llano
- Jacob Thomson
- Regan Yee
- Alycia Cridebring
- Ben Veatch
- Diego Zarate
- Matt Wilkinson
- Wes Porter

=== Coaches ===
- Stephen Haas
- Pat Casey
