= Alvin Haynes =

Barbadian triple jumper

Personal information
- Nationality: Barbadian
- Born: 6 June 1968 (age 58) England

Sport
- Sport: Athletics
- Event: Triple jump

Alvin Haynes (born 6 June 1968) is a Barbadian athlete who competed in the men's triple jump at the 1992 Summer Olympics. As an athlete for the University of Mississippi, Haynes was a two-time Southeastern Conference champion and is the current Barbadian national record holder in triple jump.

== Early life ==
Alvin Haynes was born in England on 6 June 1968 and was raised in Christ Church, Barbados. Haynes attended St. Matthias Boys Primary School in the parish, where he excelled at running. Stefon Jordan of Barbados Today described Haynes as "unstoppable" during his races.

Upon Haynes' admission to foundation school, he was met with increased competition in the sprints, frequently losing races. At the school, Haynes pivoted to long jump and high jump, before finding success in triple jump.

At the 1984 CARIFTA Games, Haynes won gold in the triple jump competition for boys under 17. At the 1987 CARIFTA Games, Haynes won bronze in the same event for boys under 20.

== Collegiate career ==
After completing some engineering study at the Samuel Jackman Prescod Institute of Technology in Pine Hill, Barbados, Haynes was offered a full athletic scholarship at the University of Mississippi in Oxford, Mississippi, United States, to compete for the Ole Miss Rebels track and field program.

As a member of the Rebels, Haynes earned indoor All-American honors after finishing fifth in the triple jump at the 1991 NCAA Division I Men's Indoor Track and Field Championships, and earned an outdoor All-American nod after finishing fourth in the event at the 1992 NCAA Division I Men's Outdoor Track and Field Championships. He was also a two-time Southeastern Conference champion in the triple jump, winning the conference championship in 1990 and 1992. At the 1992 conference championships, Haynes set his career personal record, with a mark of 16.70 metres. The mark remains a Barbadian national record.

Haynes graduated with a bachelor's degree in business administration. He was roommates with fellow Barbadian Olympian Allan Ince.

The university's student newspaper, The Daily Mississippian, listed Haynes as one of the "players that put Ole Miss Athletics on the map" in 2023.

== Professional career ==
At the men's triple jump event at the 1992 Summer Olympics, Haynes finished the qualifying round with a mark of 15.93 metres, good for 32nd in the field, which did not advance him to the final round.
