= Lauren Kleppin =

American long-distance runner

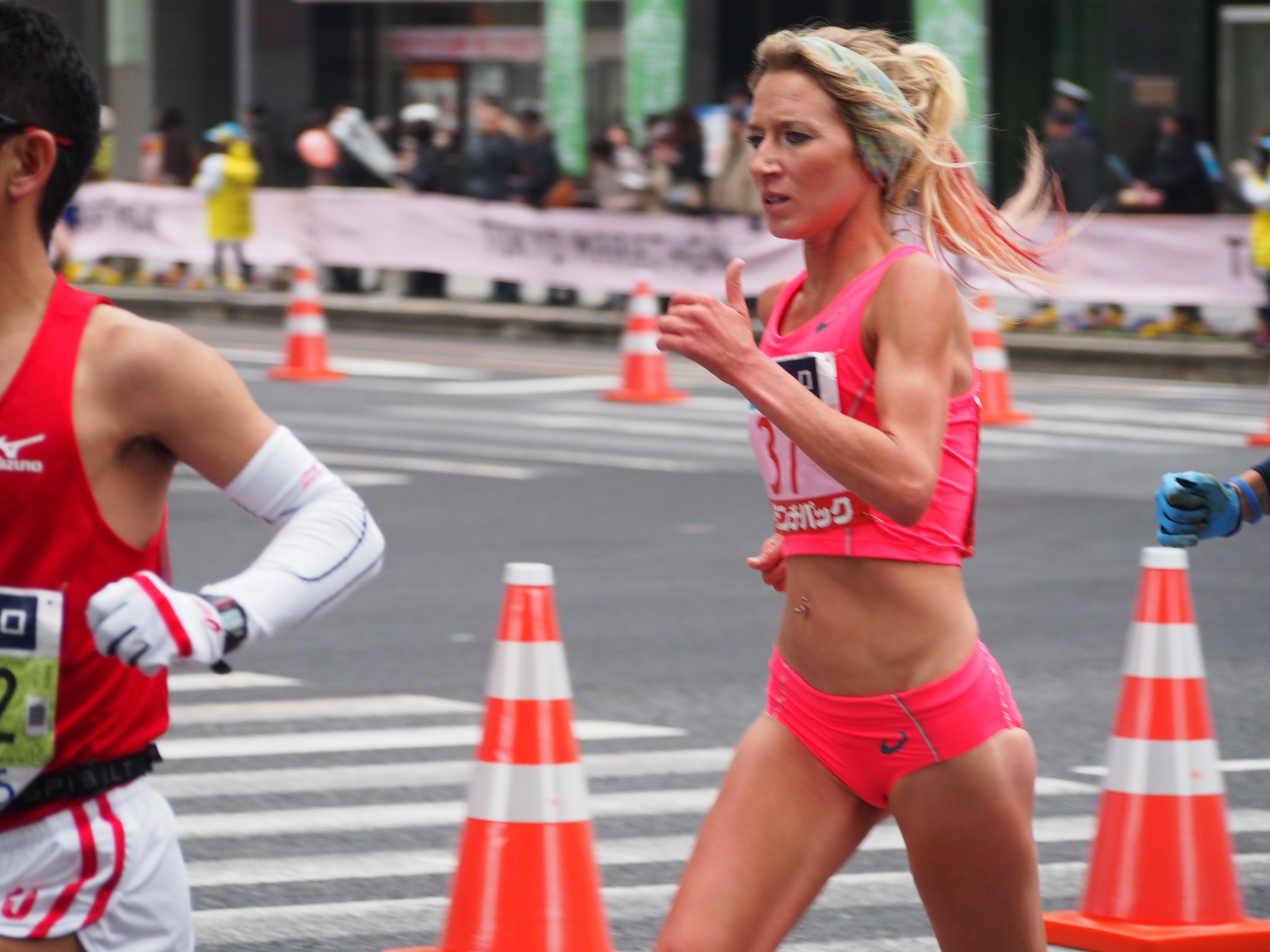
- Kleppin at the 2015 Tokyo Marathon

Personal information
- Born: November 22, 1988 (age 37) Milwaukee, Wisconsin
- Height: 5 ft 3 in (1.60 m)
- Weight: 104 lb (47 kg)
- Website: Official website

Sport
- Event(s): Marathon, 10,000 m
- College team: Western State Colorado University Mountaineers
- Club: HOKA Northern Arizona Elite
- Turned pro: 2012
- Coached by: Ben Rosario

Achievements and titles
- World finals: 2013 half marathon, 14th
- Highest world ranking: 102nd marathon 2014
- Personal best(s): 3000 m: 9:53.26 5000 m: 16:10.92; 10000 m: 32:49.92; Half Marathon: 1:10:15 Marathon: 2:28:48
Medal record
Women's Athletics
Representing the United States

Lauren Kleppin (born November 22, 1988) is an American long-distance runner. Kleppin competes in marathon, half-marathon, and numerous road distances. She holds the second highest American finish at the Los Angeles Marathon since 2012, having finished third in 2014. She is also a ten-time NCAA All-American, twice in cross country and eight times in track and field.

== Personal life ==
Born and raised in the Greater Milwaukee area, Lauren graduated from South Milwaukee High School. Prior to Western State Colorado University, where she earned a degree in Art, minoring in Outdoor Recreation - Kleppin attended Colorado State University. Lauren lettered four times in both cross country and track while at South Milwaukee High School in South Milwaukee, Wisconsin. She was named first-team all-Southeast Conference four times and twice was named to the all-state cross country team. She received many individual honors, including MVP of both cross country and track teams, and rookie of the year in cross country, and twice was named most improved in cross country. She holds the school record in the mile (5:02) and in the two mile (10:57). Her Hobbies are Hiking, Reading next to the creek in Mammoth, Kayaking, Fishing, Paddle boarding, Watercolor painting. Kleppin is also passionate for the Whitmore Animal Shelter and Save the Colorado. In 2016, she attended the PNC Milwaukee Marathon to hand out medals to kids and cheer on the runners.

== 2008-2012 ==
Lauren Kleppin was a DII standout, earning 10 All-American honors, setting the Western State, Rocky Mountain Athletic Conference, and NCAA Division 2 records in the 10,000 meters. Kleppin holds the following record:

- Women's NCAA Division 2 all-time 10,000 metres record (set at Stanford Invitational in 2012 with a time of 32:49.92)

Significant win at 2012 Open Air Big Bear, California 50K

== 2013 ==
Since leaving WSCU, Kleppin continued her distance running success, with a victories at the 2013 Carlsbad Marathon (2:42:17) and 2013 Cellcom Green Bay Marathon (2:47:20). Lauren Kleppin was coached by Terrance Mahon until he left to start Boston Athletic Association distance group in September 2013.

== 2014 ==
Kleppin was the runner-up finisher at the 2014 USA Half-Marathon Championships in 1:12:12.

Lauren was the third-place finisher and top American at the 2014 Los Angeles Marathon, where she took 13 minutes off her previous marathon personal best.

Kleppin represented the United States with a 14th place finish at the 2014 IAAF World Half Marathon Championships in Copenhagen in a personal best time of 1:10:16.

Lauren finished 4th in the Bix 7 / USA 7 mile championship in Davenport, Iowa behind Molly Huddle, Sara Hall, and Rachel Ward in 37:34 [5:22 / mile pace].

Kleppin had an Asics shoe contract, and worked part-time at the Mammoth Tavern (a bar and restaurant).

Kleppin will race the 2014 TCS New York City Marathon on Sunday, November 2.

Kleppin finished 15th at NYC marathon in 2:39:13 at 2014 TCS New York City Marathon - American Women Field.

Professional Women	Personal Best Marathon	Twitter Handle
Deena Kastor	2:19:36	@DeenaKastor
Desiree Linden	2:22:28	@des_linden
Kara Goucher	2:24:52	@karagoucher
Lauren Kleppin	2:28:48	@laurenkleppin
Annie Bersagel	2:28:59	@AnnieBersagel
Blake Russell	2:29:10	@BlakeRun
Michelle Lilienthal	2:34:50	
Marci Gage	2:35:40	
Laurie Knowles	2:36:29	
Alvina Begay	2:37:14	@AYBegay
Kasie Enman	2:37:14	
Alia Gray	2:44:22	@aliatgray
Kate Pallardy	2:48:51	@KatePallardy
Teresa McWalters	Debut	(1:14:23 Half-Marathon)

Lauren ranked 7th in 2014 the United States Marathon.

== 2015 ==
Kleppin blogs about returning to Mammoth. Watch Lauren finish 12th in the USA Track and Field half marathon championships in 1:12:31.

Lauren ran 2:37:13 to finish 11th in the Tokyo Marathon on 22 February.

On May 17, 2015, Lauren finished 12th at San Francisco Bay to Breakers 12 km in 42:51.

In August, trains in Flagstaff, Arizona. She joined the Hoka One One team in October.

== 2016 ==
Lauren will compete in the 2016 US Olympic Marathon Trials in Los Angeles, California in February for a chance to earn a medal for United States at the 2016 Summer Olympics.

== Awards and world rankings ==
ten-time NCAA All-American
two in cross country 2010-11 2011-12 U.S. Track & Field and Cross Country Coaches Association
eight times in track and field

2014 Women's Marathon – 80
2014 Women's Road Running – 157
