= Carlie Pipe =

Long-distance runner from Barbados

Carlie Pipe (born March 9, 1987) is a track and field long distance runner who competes internationally for Barbados.

In 2013, she finished 4th at the Lamentin 15k. At the 2014 IAAF World Half Marathon Championships Pipe finished 85th and set a national record. She was the first athlete from Barbados to ever compete in this event.

Also in 2014, she finished 3rd in the 5k associated with the Blue Nose Marathon. She had taken some time off, but returned to competition in 2016.

Pipe formerly attended Harrison College. She is a writer by profession.
