= Ken Martin (runner) =

American distance runner

Personal information
- Nationality: American
- Born: September 10, 1958 (age 67)

Sport
- Sport: Athletics
- Event: long-distance / steeplechase

Ken Martin (born September 10, 1958) is an American former long-distance runner who is a two-time United States national champion in the marathon.

Martin competed for the Oregon Ducks track and field team in the NCAA.

Martin won the British AAA Championships title in the steeplechase event at the 1981 AAA Championships.

At the 1984 California International Marathon, Martin set a course record with a time of 2:11:24. At the 1985 Pittsburgh Marathon, he competed alongside his wife at the time, Lisa Martin; they became the fastest married couple ever in a marathon and won both of their divisions. He came second in the 1989 New York City Marathon in 2:09:38 to Tanzania’s Juma Ikangaa’s 2:08:01; as of 2007, that was the fourth-fastest marathon time by an American-born athlete.

Martin contracted Non-Hodgkin lymphoma cancer in 2022.

== Achievements ==
- All results regarding marathon, unless stated otherwise

Year	Competition	Venue	Position	Notes
Representing the United States
1984	California International Marathon	California State Capitol, United States	1st	2:11:24
1985	Pittsburgh Marathon	Pittsburgh, United States	1st	2:12:57
1989	Pittsburgh Marathon	Pittsburgh, United States	1st	2:15:28
1989	New York Marathon	New York City, United States	2nd	2:09:38
