= Aweke Ayalew =

Bahraini middle-distance runner

Personal information
- Born: 23 February 1993 (age 33) Ethiopia

Sport
- Sport: Track and field
- Events: 5000 metres, 10,000 metres

Aweke Ayalew (born 23 February 1993) is an Ethiopian-born Bahraini middle-distance and long-distance runner. He competed in the 5000 and 10,000 metres at the 2015 World Championships in Beijing.

== International competitions ==
Year	Competition	Venue	Position	Event	Notes
Representing Bahrain
2014	World Half Marathon Championships	Copenhagen, Denmark	50th	Half marathon	1:03:01
2014	Continental Cup	Marrakesh, Morocco	5th	3000 m	7:56.58^{1}
2015	Arab Championships	Isa Town, Bahrain	3rd	5000 m	13:29.03
2015	World Championships	Beijing, China	33rd (h)	5000 m	14:07.18
2015	World Championships	Beijing, China	21st	10,000 m	29:14.55
2017	Islamic Solidarity Games	Baku, Azerbaijan	8th	5000 m	13:36.31

^{1}Representing Asia-Pacific

== Personal bests ==
Outdoor

- 3000 metres – 7:49.09 (Székesfehérvár 2014)
- 5000 metres – 13:05.00 (Rabat 2013)
- 10,000 metres – 29:14.55 (Beijing 2015)
- Half marathon – 1:03:01 (Copenhagen 2014)

Indoor

- 5000 metres – 13:30.79 (Düsseldorf 2015)
