= Meryem Akda =

Kenyan-Turkish long-distance runner (born 1992)

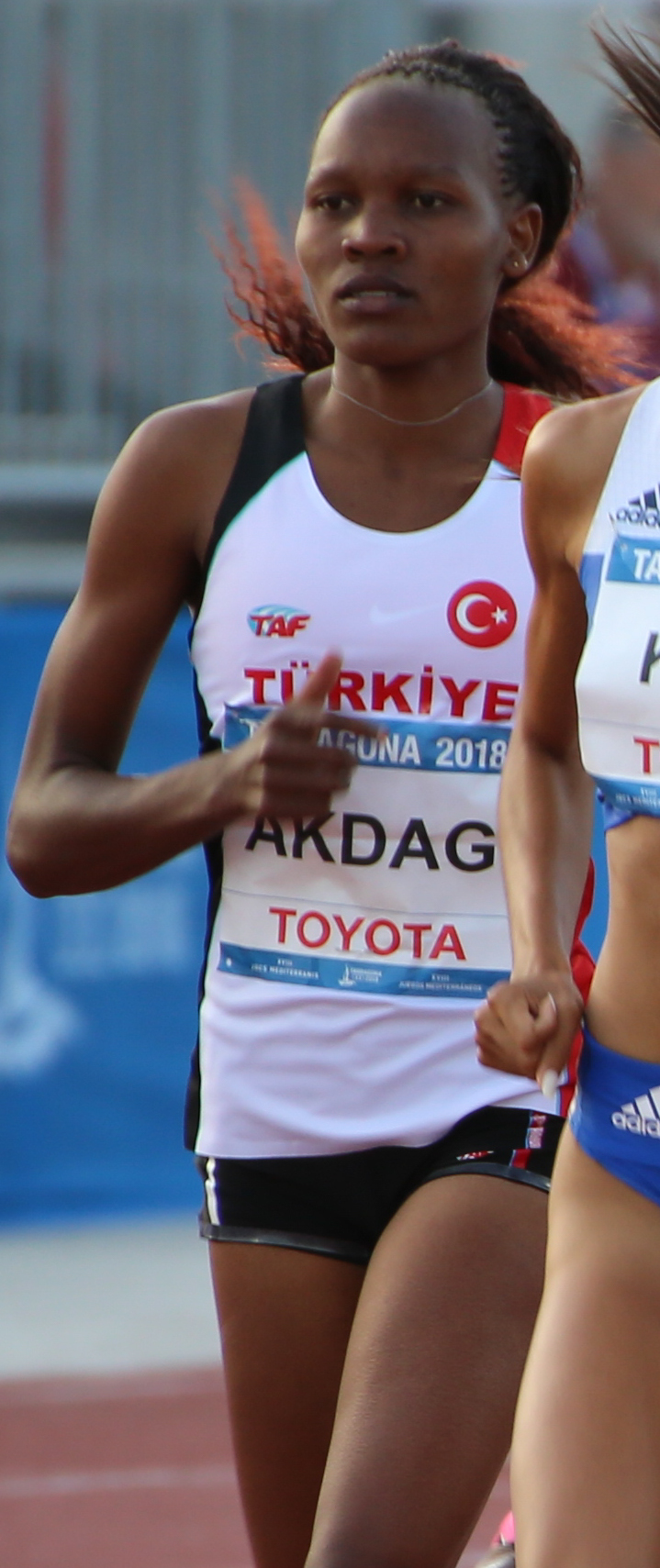
- Meryem Akda in 2018

Personal information
- Nationality: Turkey
- Born: Mirriam Jepchirchir Maiyo; August 5, 1992 (age 34) Nairobi, Kenya
- Height: 1.71 m (5 ft 7 1/2 in)
- Weight: 51 kg (112 lb)

Sport
- Sport: Middle-distance, long-distance
- Club: Enkaspor
Medal record
Women's athletics
Representing Turkey
European Team Championships
Bronze medal – third place	2017 Lille	1500 m

Meryem Akda, also spelled Akdağ (born Mirriam Jepchirchir Maiyo on August 5, 1992) is a Kenyan middle and long-distance running athlete who represents Turkey. competing in the 3000 m steeplechase and 5000 m events. She is a member of Enkaspor in Istanbul.

She competed for Kenya until May 21, 2015. On March 13, 2016, she became officially eligible to represent Turkey at international competitions.

Akda earned a quota spot for the women's 5000 m and another one for women's 3000 m steeplechase event in the 2016 Summer Olympics.
