= Weini Kelati =

American middle- and long-distance runner (born 1996)

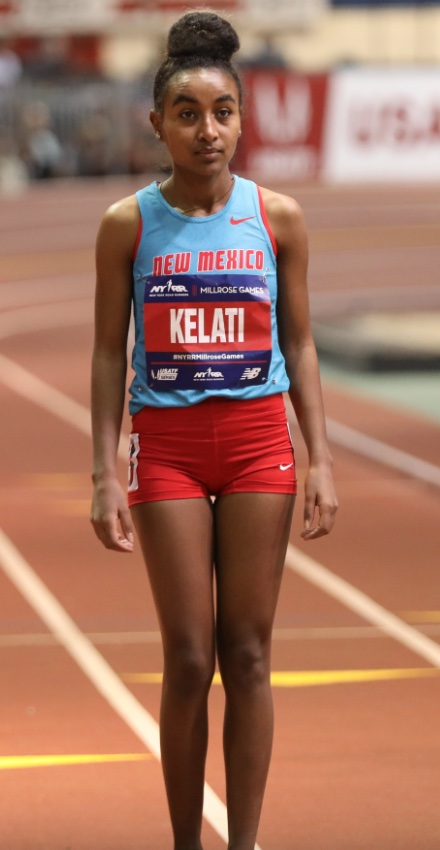
- Kelati at the Millrose Games in 2019

Personal information
- Nationality: American
- Born: December 1, 1996 (age 29) Adi Bidel, Central Region, Eritrea
- Home town: Flagstaff, Arizona, U.S.

Sport
- Country: United States
- Sport: Track and Field
- Event: Distance
- College team: New Mexico Lobos
- Club: Dark Sky Distance (2020–2025); Nike (2026–present)
- Turned pro: December 2020

Achievements and titles
- Personal bests: Outdoor; 1500 m: 4:10.88 (Eugene 2021); 3000 m: 8:32.50 (Oslo 2023); 5000 m: 14:35.43 (Eugene 2024); 10000 m: 30:33.82 (San Juan Capistrano 2024); Indoor; Mile: 4:37.75i NR (Albuquerque 2019); 3000 m: 8:53.98i NR (New York City 2019); 5000 m: 15:14.71i NR (Boston 2019); Half marathon: 01:06:04 NR (Barcelona 2026)
Medal record
Women's athletics
Representing United States
World Road Running Championships
Gold medal – first place	2026 Copenhagen	Half marathon team

Weini Kelati Frezghi (Tigrinya: ወይኒ ቀላቲ ፍረዝጊ, Weyni K'elati Frezgi; born December 1, 1996) is an American middle and long distance runner. Born in Eritrea, she claimed asylum in the United States in July 2014. While attending Heritage High School in Leesburg, Virginia, she won several state and national level competitions in track and cross country. At the University of New Mexico, Kelati won the 2019 NCAA Division I Cross Country Championships.

In June 2021, she became a U.S. citizen and began competing for the United States. She is the American record holder in the half marathon, with a time of 1:06.04 set in February 2026. Kelati also won a national title in the 10000 meters at the 2024 Olympic Trials, qualifying for the 2024 Summer Olympics in Paris. She ran professionally for Under Armour with the group Dark Sky Distance from 2020-2025, before switching her sponsorship to Nike in 2026.

== Early life and asylum in the United States ==
Kelati is from Tsada Kristian, a district center of Berikh, 5 miles west of Asmara, in the Central Region of Eritrea. She started running competitively when a physical education teacher at her school encouraged her to take up the sport. In July 2014, at the age of 17, she traveled to Eugene, Oregon to compete in the 3000 m at the 2014 World Junior Championships in Athletics. Following the competition, Kelati intentionally missed her return flight to Eritrea and sought asylum in the United States. She did not disclose this plan beforehand to her family back in Eritrea.

A relative in Leesburg, Virginia became Kelati’s legal guardian, and she joined Heritage High School, where she began competing in cross country and track. She faced challenges adapting to her new environment, including learning English and dealing with culture shock. Within a year, she managed to develop a functional level of fluency in English.

== Running career ==
=== High school ===
Kelati started running for Heritage High School as a junior in 2014. In her first season, she finished second in the Virginia State Cross Country Championships, and she finished 20th at the Footlocker Cross Country Championships. In 2015, the high school senior finished first in both the Virginia State Cross Country Championships and the Footlocker Cross Country Championships.

On the track, Kelati placed first in the outdoor 3200 m at the 2016 Virginia Outdoor Track and Field Championship. She also finished first in several national competitions. These victories included a national high school girls' record for the indoor 5000 m with her time of 16:08.83 at the New Balance Nationals Indoor in March 2016. In November 2016, she committed to run for the University of New Mexico.

=== College ===
While at the University of New Mexico, Kelati recorded several All American finishes in cross country. At the NCAA Division I Cross Country Championships in 2017 and 2018, she finished seventh and second, respectively. She then went on to win the competition in 2019 in 19:47.5, which was 9.6 seconds ahead of the second-place finisher, Alicia Monson, in the largest margin of victory since 2007. Her win helped her team, the New Mexico Lobos, secure a fourth-place finish. She was subsequently named the Honda Sports Award recipient for cross country. On the track, she won a national title in the 10000 m of the 2019 NCAA Division I Outdoor Track & Field Championships, finishing in 33:10.84.

=== Professional ===
==== 2020–2021 ====
Kelati announced her decision to turn professional in December 2020, foregoing her remaining NCAA eligibility at the University of New Mexico. On June 23, 2021, Kelati became a naturalized U.S. citizen, and she changed her national sports allegiance from Eritrea to the United States. She took part in the 10000 m of the 2020 U.S. Olympic Trials, which was postponed to 2021 due to the COVID-19 pandemic. Kelati did not finish the race, dropping out after 7000 m. In her next race, Kelati ran the fastest time by an American in a women's-only event at the Boston 10K for Women, recording a time of 31:18. In November, she won the USATF 5K Road Championships in a course record of 15:18.

==== 2022 ====
Kelati competed in January at the 2022 USA Cross Country Championships in San Diego, California, where she placed second. The following month, at the 2022 USA Indoor Track and Field Championships, she finished third in the 3000 m, clocking a time of 8:47.8. At the 2022 USA Outdoor Track and Field Championships, held in July, she finished fourth in the 5000 m. In November, Kelati won the USATF 5K Championships for the second year in a row, while lowering the course record she established in 2021 by two seconds. That same month, Kelati defended her title at the Manchester Road Race, setting a course record in the process.

==== 2023 ====
In January, Kelati finished fifth at the 2023 USA Cross Country Championships held in Richmond, Virginia, which qualified her to compete for the United States at the 44th World Athletics Cross Country Championships in Bathurst, Australia on February 18, 2023. Kelati 21st while dealing with hip pain and miscounting a lap. She was the second American to cross the finish line, following her former University of New Mexico teammate, Ednah Kurgat, who came in 18th.

In July, Kelati participated in the 2023 USA Outdoor Track and Field Championships in the 5000 m and 10000 m, finishing in eighth and fourth, respectively. In September, she clinched a first-place finish at the USATF 10 km Championships. The following month, she finished fifth in the 5k at the 2023 World Athletics Road Running Championships in Riga, Latvia. In November, Kelati contested the USATF 5K Championships, and while she entered the race as the two-time defending champion, she finished in fifth place.

==== 2024 ====
Kelati placed fourth at the Houston Half Marathon in 1:06:25 on January 14, setting the American record in the event and averaging 5:04 minutes per mile. En route to the finish, she also set a North American record for 20 km (63:05). Six days after setting an American record for the half marathon in Houston, Kelati won the 10-kilometer race at USATF National Club Cross Country Championships at Pole Green Park in Richmond, Virginia with a time of 32:58.6. In March, she represented the United States at the 2024 World Athletics Cross Country Championships in Belgrade, Serbia, where she finished in 15th as the top American. At the 2024 Olympic Trials, Kelati won a national title in the 10000m, which qualified her to represent the United States at the 2024 Summer Olympics in Paris.

==== 2025 ====
Kelati improved her American record in the half marathon by 16 seconds in January, running 1:06:09 to finish second at the Houston Half Marathon.

==== 2026 ====
In November 2026, Kelati ran 2:26:51 at the New York City Marathon to place seventh overall and third among Americans behind Jessica McClain and Carrie Ellwood.

== Personal life ==
After receiving asylum in the US in 2014, Kelati was unable to see her mother for eight years. It was not until she became a U.S. citizen (a status that granted her the freedom to travel internationally) that she was able to reunite with her mother in Uganda.

Her favorite movie is McFarland, USA, which tells the story of a predominantly Latino cross-country team in McFarland, California. Sprinter Usain Bolt is her favorite athlete.

== Achievements ==
=== International competitions ===
Representing the United States
Year	Competition	Venue	Position	Event	Time
2023	World Athletics Road Running Championships	Riga, Latvia	7th	5 km	15:10
2024	World Cross Country Championships	Belgrade, Serbia	15th	10km	32:53
2024	Olympic Games	Paris, France	8th	10000m	30:49.98

=== National championships ===
Year	Competition	Venue	Position	Event	Time
2022	2022 USA Outdoor Track and Field Championships	Eugene, Oregon	5th	10,000 m	31:39.90
2022	2022 USA Outdoor Track and Field Championships	Eugene, Oregon	4th	5000 m	15:52.57
2023	USATF Outdoor Championships	Eugene, Oregon	4th	10000m	32:30.40
2024	USA Olympic Trials	Eugene, Oregon	1st	10000m	31:41.07
2025	2025 USA Outdoor Track and Field Championships	Eugene, Oregon	4th	10,000 m	31:46.37
2025	2025 USA Outdoor Track and Field Championships	Eugene, Oregon	4th	5,000 m	15:15.89

=== Circuit performances ===
Grand Slam Track results
Slam	Race group	Event	Pl.	Time	Prize money
2025 Philadelphia Slam	Long distance	3000 m	4th	8:45.31	US$12,500

=== NCAA competition ===
All results from athlete's profile on the Track & Field Results Reporting Service (TFRRS).

Year	Competition	Venue	Position	Event	Notes
Representing University of New Mexico
2020	2020 NCAA Division I Indoor Track and Field Championships	Albuquerque, New Mexico	All-American	5000 m	Cancelled due to COVID-19
2020	Mountain West Conference; Indoor Track and Field; Championship	Albuquerque, New Mexico	1st	Distance medley relay	11:12.27; Adva Cohen, Abigail Bendle, Elise Thorner, Weini Kelati
2019	2019 NCAA Division I Cross Country Championships	Terre Haute, Indiana	1st	6000 m	19:47.5
2019	Mountain West Conference; Cross Country Championship	Logan, Utah	1st	6000 m	19:11.2
2019	2019 NCAA Division I Outdoor Track and Field Championships	Austin, Texas	5th	5000 m	15:54.46
2019	2019 NCAA Division I Outdoor Track and Field Championships	Austin, Texas	1st	10,000 m	33:10.84
2019	Mountain West Conference; Outdoor Track and Field; Championship	Fresno, California	1st	10,000 m	32:09.10
2019	2019 NCAA Division I Indoor Track and Field Championships	Birmingham, Alabama	2nd	5000 m	15:32.95
2019	2019 NCAA Division I Indoor Track and Field Championships	Birmingham, Alabama	3rd	3000 m	9:02.44
2019	Mountain West Conference; Indoor Track and Field; Championship	Albuquerque, New Mexico	1st	Mile	4:37.75
2019	Mountain West Conference; Indoor Track and Field; Championship	Albuquerque, New Mexico	2nd	Distance medley relay	11:29.42; Weini Kelati, Larimar Rodriguez, Kieran Casey, Ednah Kurgat
2018	2018 NCAA Division I Cross Country Championships	Madison, Wisconsin	2nd	6000 m	19:45.3
2018	Mountain West Conference; Cross Country Championship	San Diego, California	1st	6000 m	19:49.3
2018	2018 NCAA Division I Outdoor Track and Field Championships	Eugene, Oregon	9th	5000 m	15:46.57
2018	Mountain West Conference; Outdoor Track and Field; Championship	Fresno, California	1st	10,000 m	32:41.92
2018	2018 NCAA Division I Indoor Track and Field Championships	College Station, Texas	5th	5000 m	15:56.73
2018	2018 NCAA Division I Indoor Track and Field Championships	College Station, Texas	5th	3000 m	9:03.51
2018	Mountain West Conference; Indoor Track and Field; Championship	Albuquerque, New Mexico	1st	3000 m	9:13.40
2017	2017 NCAA Division I Cross Country Championships	Louisville, Kentucky	7th	6000 m	19:35.8
2017	Mountain West Conference; Cross Country Championship	Albuquerque, New Mexico	2nd	6000 m	20:11.7

=== High school competition ===
All results from athlete's profile on Milesplit VA.

Representing Heritage High School (Leesburg, Virginia) at Virginia High School League 4A state championship
Year	Cross country state championships	Outdoor track state championships
2015-16	1st in 5 km (17:22)	1st in the 3200 m (10:09.70)
2014-15	2nd in 5 km (17:38)	2nd in the 3200 m (10:54.45)
2014-15	2nd in 5 km (17:38)	6th in the 4x800 m (9:51.02); Megan Collins, Weini Kelati, Sarah Smith, Georgie Mackenzie
2014-15	2nd in 5 km (17:38)	3rd in the 1600 m (5:16.95)
