= Manish Singh Rawat =

Indian racewalker

Personal information
- Born: 5 May 1991 (age 35) Chamoli, Uttarakhand, India

Sport
- Country: India
- Sport: Track and field
- Event: racewalking
Medal record
New Delhi Indian Race Walking championships 2018
Silver medal – second place	New Delhi	20Km
Dehradun Indian Police Championships 2017
Gold medal – first place	Uttrakhand	20Km

Manish Singh Rawat (born 5 May 1991) is a male Indian racewalker. He competes in the 20 km and the 50 km events and is employed by the Uttarakhand State Police. He has been part of the Indian racewalking squad for the past 3 years.

He competed in the 50 kilometres walk event at the 2015 World Championships in Athletics in Beijing, China. Manish Singh also completed his 20 km race in 1 hour 20 minutes and 50 seconds at the IAAF Race Walking challenge in April 2015.

He is a landless agriculture labourer from Uttarakhand who has also worked as a waiter for a living.

He is currently being supported by the GoSports Foundation through the Rahul Dravid Athlete Mentorship Programme.

== Career ==
Born in a family of modest means, Manish walked 7 km each way to school. He secured his berth for the Rio Olympics after making the qualification mark, clocking 1:22:50, at the IAAF Racewalking Challenge, finishing 9th.

At the Rio Olympics, Manish finished a commendable 13th in the 20 km race walking category ahead of higher ranked opponents.

== Achievements ==
New Delhi Indian Race Walking championships

Year	Venue	Event	Total	Result
2018	New Delhi	20 km	01:21:32	Silver

Gold Coast Commonwealth Games

Year	Venue	Event	Total	Result
2018	Gold Coast	20 km	01:22:22	6th Place

Rio de Janeiro Olympic Games

Year	Venue	Event	Total	Result
2016	Rio de Janeiro	20 km	01:21:21	13th Place

== See also ==
- India at the 2015 World Championships in Athletics
