= Pittsburgh Marathon =

Annual race in the United States held since 1985

- Date: First Sunday in May
- Location: Pittsburgh, Pennsylvania, U.S.
- Event type: Road
- Distance: Marathon, half marathon, marathon relay, 5K
- Primary sponsor: DICK'S Sporting Goods
- Established: May 5, 1985 (41 years ago)
- Course records: Men: 2:10:24 (1995) (Kenya) John Kagwe; Women: 2:29:50 (1988) (Note: The Pittsburgh Marathon hosted the 1988 U.S. Olympic Trials for the women's marathon. It was run on the same day as the main marathon and on the same course, but was considered a separate event. Nevertheless, the marathon organizers treat the time that Margaret Groos set during the trials to be the "event record".) (United States) Margaret Groos
- Website: Pittsburgh Marathon
- Participants: 3,418 finishers (2019)

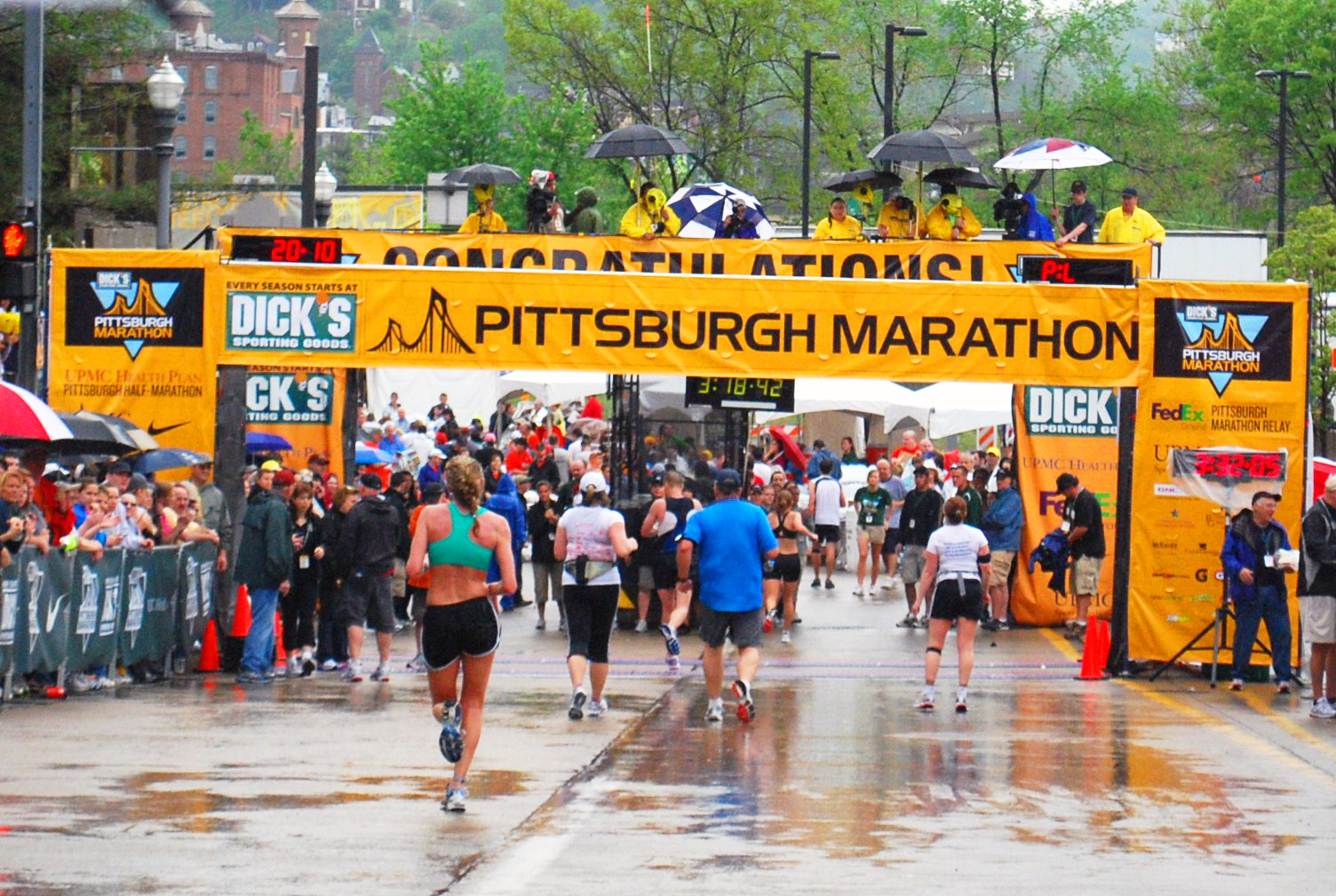
Finish line downtown in 2010

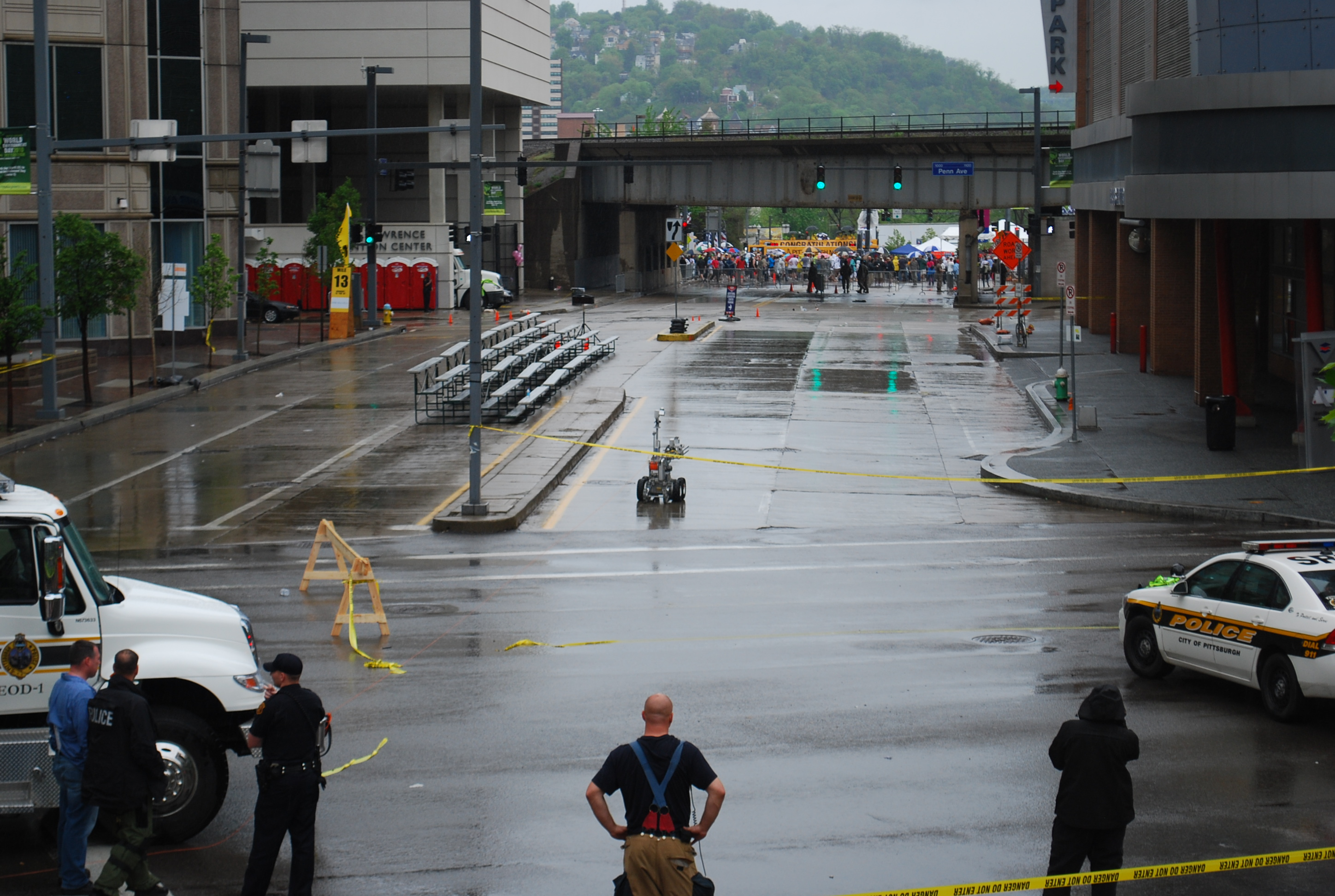
Bomb squad dealing with suspected explosive in microwave oven, 2010 (Note: The bomb disposal robot is in the middle of the road, while the oven is on the sidewalk at the top right, next to the bicycle and in front of the orange sign. The finish line can be seen beyond the bridge.)

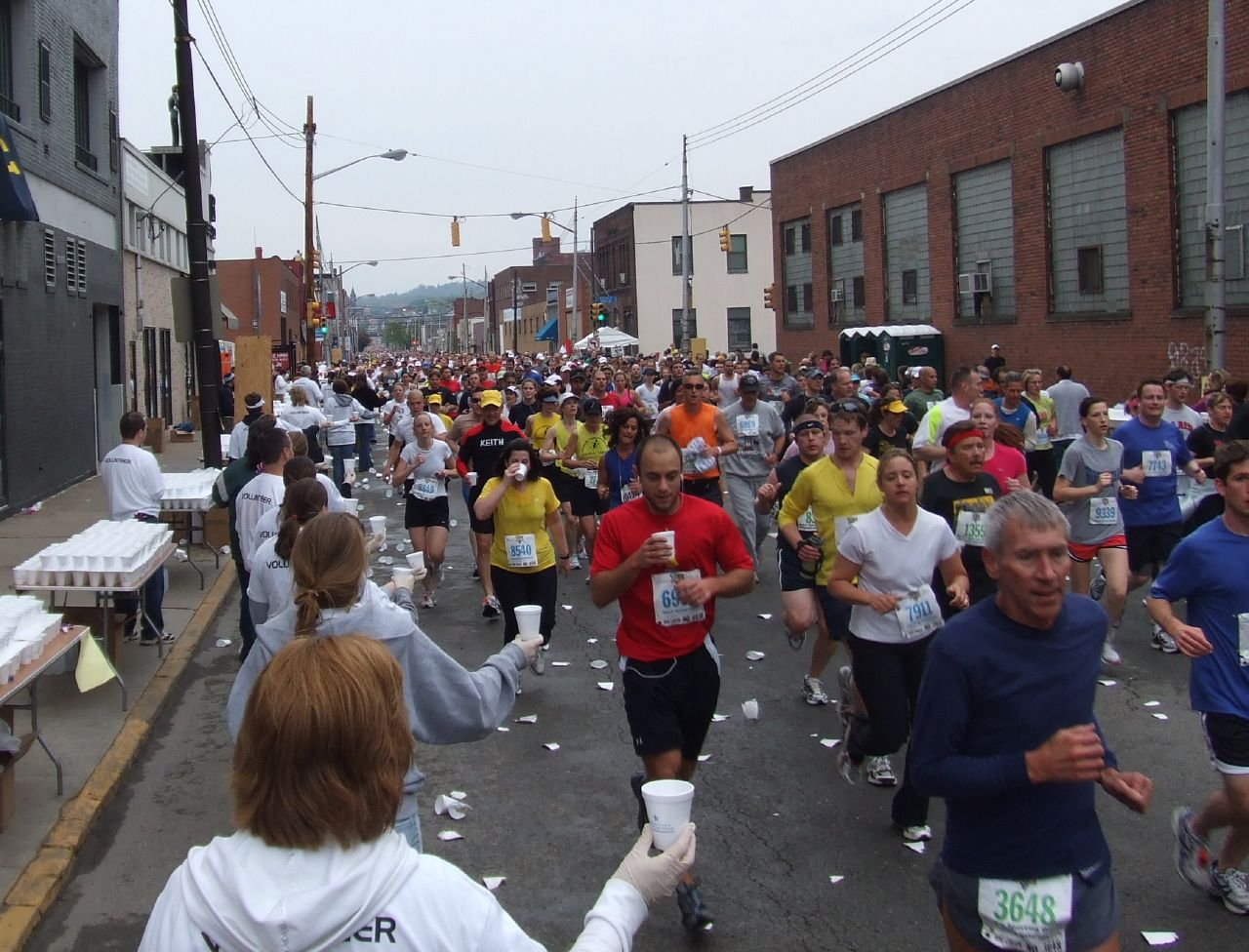
Water station around the 5 km (3.1 mi) mark on Penn Avenue in 2009

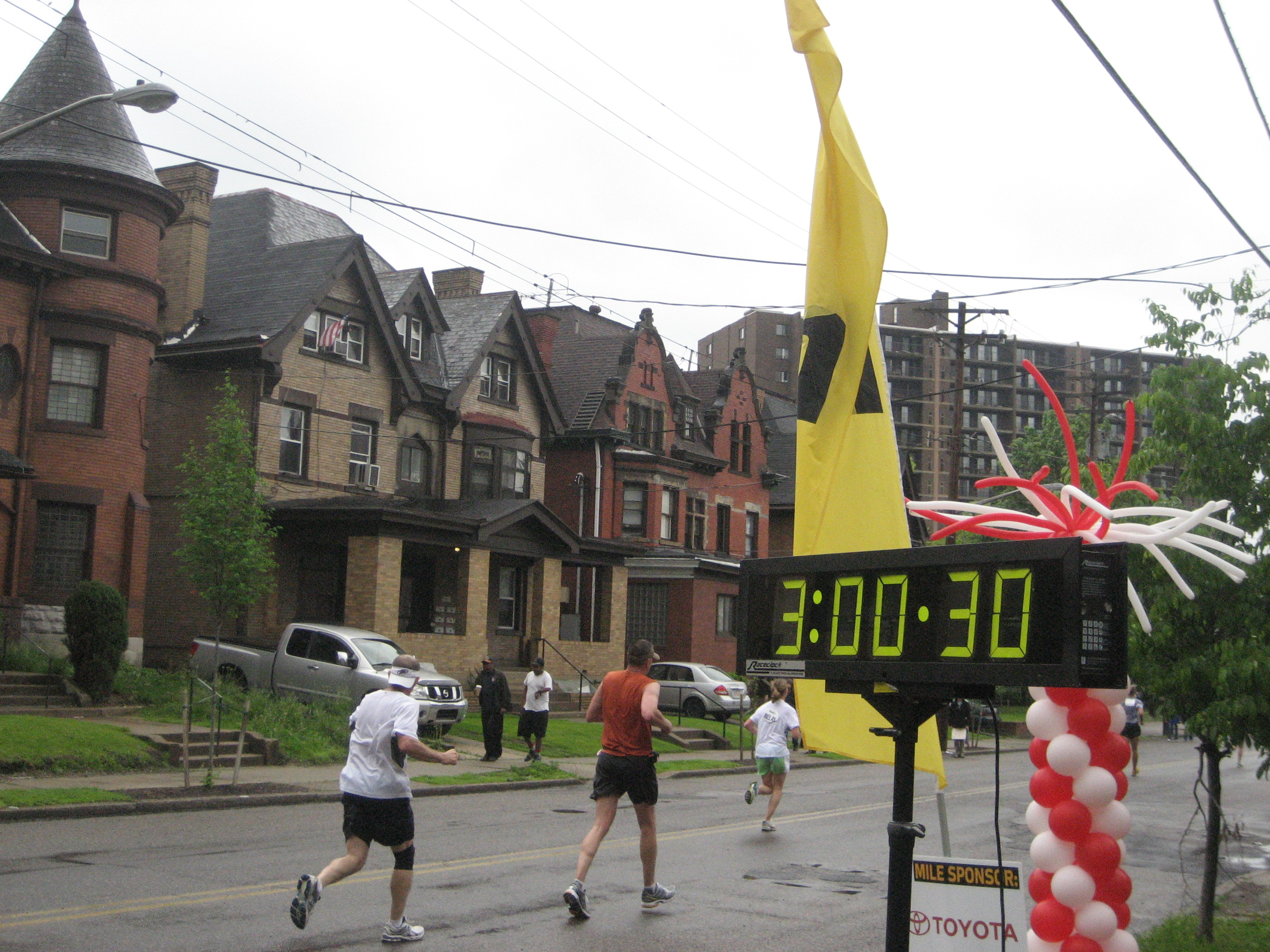
Marathoners on Negley Ave. in 2011 between Friendship and East Liberty

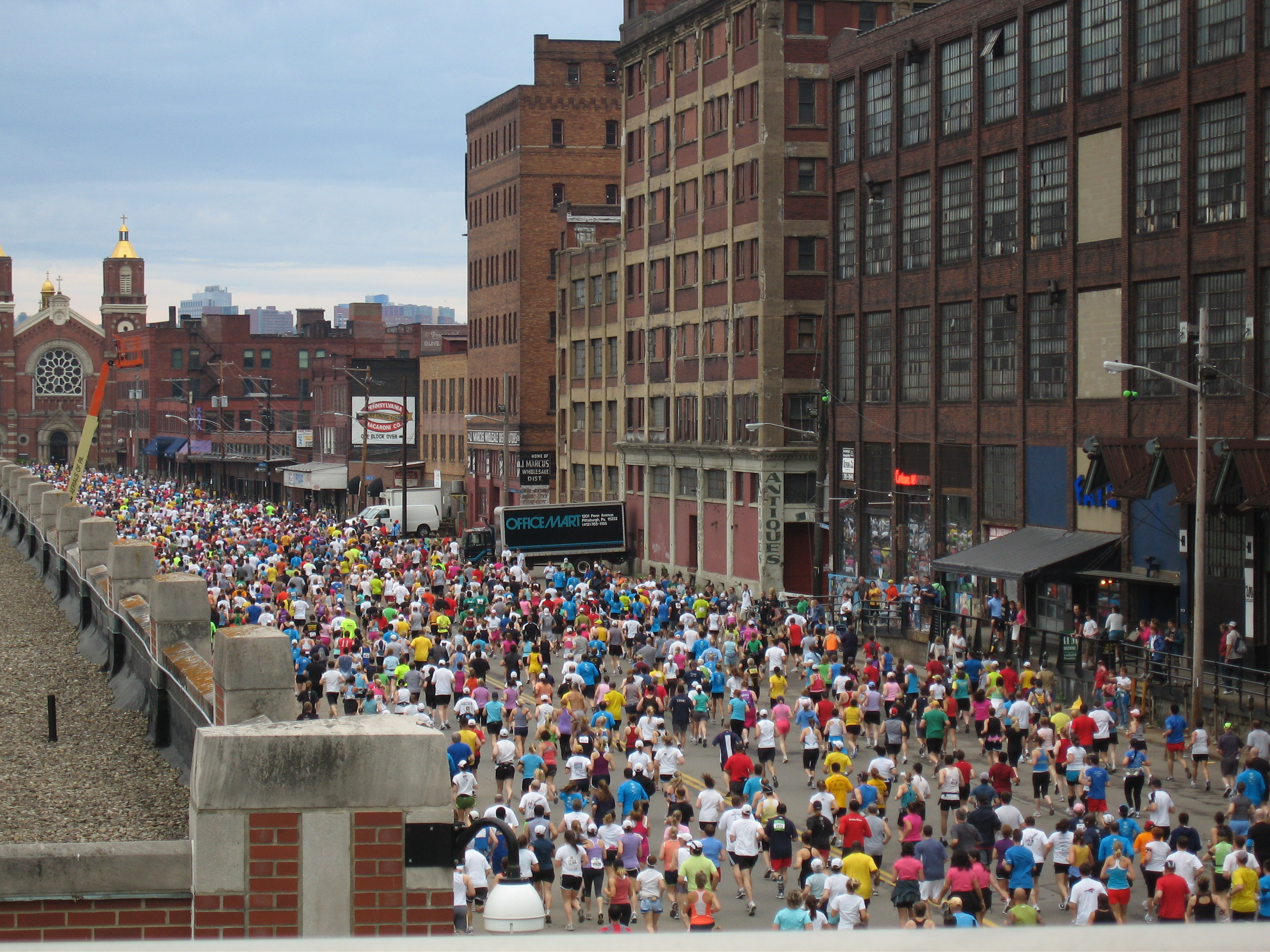
Passing Strip District warehouses near the 16th Street Bridge in 2010

The Pittsburgh Marathon (also known as DICK'S Sporting Goods Pittsburgh Marathon for sponsorship reasons) is an annual road marathon usually held on the first Sunday in May in Pittsburgh, Pennsylvania, in the United States, first held in 1985. The hilly course runs through the city center and crosses each of Pittsburgh's three main rivers. Generally, over 3,000 runners finish the marathon each year. The weekend's events also include a half marathon, marathon relay, and 5K.

== History ==
The marathon was first announced on October 3, 1984, with U.S. Steel and PNC Bank as sponsors. The inaugural marathon was held on May 5, 1985.

The Pittsburgh Marathon hosted the United States Olympic Marathon Trials for women in 1988 and for men in 2000. The trials used the same course that the main marathon did, but were considered separate events from the main marathon. In addition, Pittsburgh has served as the site for the United States men's national championship three times, the National Wheelchair Championship in 1986, as well as the Olympic Marathon Trials for both Finland and Denmark in the 1980s.

In 1996, the University of Pittsburgh Medical Center (UPMC) became the title sponsor, replacing Giant Eagle, and the race was renamed the UPMC/City of Pittsburgh Marathon (or a variation thereof) for a few years. In late 2003, serious financial difficulty within the City of Pittsburgh municipal budget and UPMC's withdraw from the title sponsorship led to the suspension of the race from 2004 to 2008. In 2009, the event was revived with a new title sponsor, Dick's Sporting Goods.

In 2010, a small microwave oven containing a suspected explosive device was found on the sidewalk near the finish line. Because a car bombing attempt in New York City had emptied Times Square the previous day, authorities were on high alert and delayed the race for about 10 minutes while a bomb squad robot neutralized the oven's contents by blowing up the microwave. Ravioli was found among its contents, and police later believed the oven had never contained any explosives.

The 2020 and 2021 editions of the race were cancelled due to the coronavirus pandemic, with all registrants having the option to either run the race virtually or obtain a refund.

== Course ==
Historically, the course has wound through the unique and hilly topography of the city. Crossing three different bridges, the course traverses all three rivers of Pittsburgh at least once. The start and finish lines have changed many times, but have always been in either Downtown or the North Shore. Previous finish lines have included Point State Park, David L. Lawrence Convention Center, and the 50-yard line of Heinz Field. The current finish line is on the Boulevard of the Allies near Point State Park. Numerous other historic and well-known Pittsburgh neighborhoods are along the route, including the South Side, Oakland, Shadyside, East Liberty, Highland Park, Bloomfield, Lawrenceville, and the Strip District.

== Other races ==
Aside from the main marathon event, several races occur during the weekend of the marathon, including a half marathon, two to five person marathon relay, 5K race, and "kids marathon". All races except for the "kids marathon" and 5K utilize the same starting time and largely the same course as the marathon.

== Participation ==
Attendance and popularity of the events has risen greatly since the 2009 revival. The 2012 race had the largest field in the history of the race. Registration for 2012 closed with roughly 25,000 participants between all races, with 6,000 entrants in the full marathon, 13,000 entrants in the half marathon, and 800 teams in the marathon relay, with the remaining entrants registered for the 5K. Additionally, an estimated 60,000 spectators lined the course, and 4,000 volunteers provided assistance. 2012 also marked the earliest sellout in the race's history with all events except the 5K selling out on or before March 6, 2012.

Throughout the course, thousands of neighborhood residents show their support by lining the streets of the course and volunteering at aid stations. Neighborhood organizations are awarded financial grants for community-engaging celebrations along the route. Sixty bands, almost all of which are from the Greater Pittsburgh area, line the streets throughout the course, spanning a range of musical genres.

== Winners ==
Key:

Course record (in bold)
American championship race

| Ed. | Date | Men's winner | Time | Women's winner | Time | Rf. |
|---|---|---|---|---|---|---|
| 1 | 1985.05.05 | Ken Martin (USA) | 2:12:57 | Lisa Ondieki (AUS) | 2:31:54 | |
| 2 | 1986.05.18 | Dean Matthews (USA) | 2:18:17 | Laura Fogli (ITA) | 2:37:04 | |
| 3 | 1987.05.03 | Rodolfo Gómez (MEX) | 2:13:07 | Silvia Ruegger (CAN) | 2:31:53 | |
| 4 | 1988.05.01 | Malcolm East (ENG) | 2:19:49 | Mary-Lynn Currier (USA) | 2:51:28 | |
| | 1988.05.01 | — | — | Margaret Groos (USA) | **2:29:50** | |
| 5 | 1989.05.07 | Ken Martin (USA) | 2:15:28 | Margaret Groos (USA) | 2:32:39 | |
| 6 | 1990.05.06 | Dick Hooper (IRL) | 2:15:49 | Conceição Ferreira (POR) | 2:30:34 | |
| 7 | 1991.05.05 | Herbert Steffny (GER) | 2:16:21 | Lynn MacDougall (USA) | 2:42:45 | |
| 8 | 1992.05.03 | Jorge González (PUR) | 2:17:33 | Albina Gallyamova (RUS) | 2:32:02 | |
| 9 | 1993.05.02 | Abel Gisemba (KEN) | 2:16:55 | Lizanne Bussières (CAN) | 2:35:39 | |
| 10 | 1994.05.01 | Abel Gisemba (KEN) | 2:13:51 | Tammy Slusser (USA) | 2:37:14 | |
| 11 | 1995.05.07 | John Kagwe (KEN) | **2:10:24** | Alina Ivanova (RUS) | 2:35:30 | |
| 12 | 1996.05.05 | Rubén Maza (VEN) | 2:12:01 | Tamara Karlyakova (RUS) | 2:36:12 | |
| 13 | 1997.05.04 | Dave Scudamore (USA) | 2:13:48 | Tatyana Titova (RUS) | 2:37:41 | |
| 14 | 1998.05.03 | Keith Brantly (USA) | 2:12:31 | Albina Gallyamova (RUS) | 2:36:50 | |
| 15 | 1999.05.02 | Alfredo Vigueras (USA) | 2:14:20 | Tatyana Titova (RUS) | 2:40:00 | |
| 16 | 2000.05.07 | Kevin Taylor (USA) | 2:37:53 | Tammy Slusser (USA) | 2:53:30 | |
| (Note: The Pittsburgh Marathon hosted the 2000 U.S. Olympic Trials for the men's marathon. It was run on the same day as the main marathon and on the same course, but was considered a separate event.) | 2000.05.07 | Rod DeHaven (USA) | 2:15:30 | — | — | |
| 17 | 2001.05.06 | Elly Rono (KEN) | 2:17:15 | Wioletta Kryza (POL) | 2:34:16 | |
| 18 | 2002.05.05 | Reuben Chesang (KEN) | 2:14:53 | Magdalena Lewy (USA) | 2:36:48 | |
| 19 | 2003.05.04 | Juan Camacho (MEX) | 2:12:05 | Lyudmila Korchagina (RUS) | 2:29:53 | |
| — | — | not held from 2004 to 2008 due to financial issues | | | | |
| 20 | 2009.05.03 | Kassahun Kabiso (ETH) | 2:22:51 | Kristin Price (USA) | 2:36:33 | |
| 21 | 2010.05.02 | Kipyegon Kirui (KEN) | 2:17:12 | Alena Vinnitskaya (BLR) | 2:42:34 | |
| 22 | 2011.05.15 | Jeffrey Eggleston (USA) | 2:16:40 | Yihunlish Delelecha (ETH) | 2:35:36 | |
| 23 | 2012.05.06 | James Kirwa (KEN) | 2:14:09 | Malika Mejdoub (MAR) | 2:39:31 | |
| 24 | 2013.05.05 | James Kirwa (KEN) | 2:13:37 | Yihunlish Delelecha (ETH) | 2:41:30 | (Note: Both the first-place finisher, Mary Akor, and the second-place finisher, Hirut Guangul, were disqualified after they were found (in separate situations over the next years) to be taking banned substances.) |
| 25 | 2014.05.04 | Gebo Gameda (ETH) | 2:16:30 | Clara Santucci (USA) | 2:34:06 | |
| 26 | 2015.05.03 | Stephen Njoroge (KEN) | 2:15:19 | Clara Santucci (USA) | 2:32:25 | |
| 27 | 2016.05.01 | Kipkoech Ruto (KEN) | 2:17:26 | Ayantu Dakebo (ETH) | 2:39:17 | |
| 28 | 2017.05.07 | Jacob Chemtai (KEN) | 2:15:25 | Ayantu Dakebo (ETH) | 2:36:20 | |
| 29 | 2018.05.06 | Fikadu Teferi (ETH) | 2:13:47 | Sydney Devore (USA) | 2:32:38 | |
| 30 | 2019.05.05 | Boniface Kongin (KEN) | 2:10:34 | Bizuwork Getahun (ETH) | 2:36:29 | |
| — | — | not held in 2020 and 2021 due to coronavirus pandemic | | | | |
| 31 | 2022.05.01 | Álvaro Abreu (DOM) | 2:16:07 | Nicole Hilton (USA) | 2:49:51 | |
| 32 | 2023.05.07 | Tyler McCandless (USA) | 2:16:08 | Margo Malone (USA) | 2:41:56 | |
| 33 | 2024.05.05 | Andrew Bowman (USA) | 2:15:52 | Jane Bareikis (USA) | 2:37:37 | |
| 34 | 2025.05.04 | Mulgeta Birhanu Feyissa (ETH) | 2:14:31 | Jane Bareikis (USA) | 2:36:01 | |
| 35 | 2026.05.03 | Will Loevner (USA) | 2:14:52 | Jane Bareikis (USA) | 2:30:33 | |
