= Simone Gariboldi =

Italian middle-distance runner

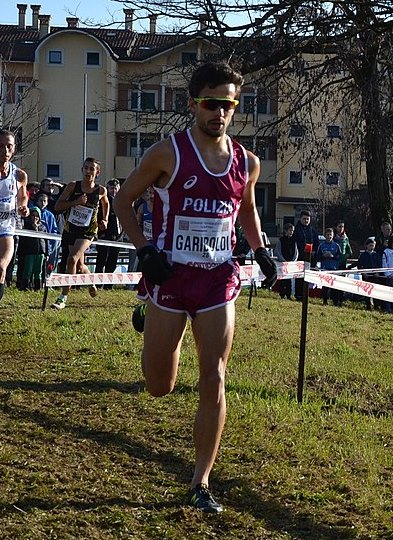

Personal information
- National team: Italy
- Born: 16 July 1987 (age 38) San Giovanni Bianco
- Height: 1.65 m (5 ft 5 in)
- Weight: 50 kg (110 lb)

Sport
- Country: Italy
- Sport: Athletics
- Event: Middle-distance running
- Club: G.S. Fiamme Oro
- Coached by: Silvano Danzi

Achievements and titles
- Personal bests: 1500 m: 3:45.01 (2010); 3000 m: 8:00.87 (2011); 5000 m: 14:00.39 (2007); 10,000 m: 29:14.41 (2012); Half marathon: 1:02.51 (2014)

Simone Gariboldi (born 16 July 1987) is an Italian male middle distance runner who won two national titles at senior level. He participated at the 2014 IAAF World Half Marathon Championships.

== Biography ==
Gariboldi won two medals with the Italian team at the European Cross Country Championships at youth level (2006, 2008). He also participated at two editions of the IAAF World Cross Country Championships (2005, 2006) at individual junior level.

== Achievements ==
Year	Competition	Venue	Position	Event	Time	Notes
2006	European Cross Country Championships	(Italy) San Giorgio su Legnano	1st	Men U23 teams	68 pts	
2008	European Cross Country Championships	(Belgium) Brussels	2nd	Men U23 teams	42 pts	
2014	World Half Marathon Championships	(Denmark) Copenhagen	45th	Half marathon	1:02.51	PB

== National titles ==
He won two national championships at individual senior level.

- Italian Athletics Championships
  - 10,000 metres: 2011
- Italian Indoor Athletics Championships
  - 3000 metres: 2012
