= Silvia Ruegger =

Canadian long-distance runner (1961–2019)

Personal information
- Full name: Silvia Rosemarie Ruegger
- Born: February 23, 1961 Oshawa, Ontario, Canada
- Died: August 23, 2019 (aged 58)

Sport
- Sport: Long-distance running

Silvia Ruegger (February 23, 1961 – August 23, 2019) was a long-distance runner from Canada who represented her native country at the 1984 Summer Olympics in Los Angeles, California, where she finished eighth in the women's marathon. She came first in the 1985 Houston Marathon in 2:28:36. She was born in Oshawa, Ontario, and grew up just south of the village of Newtonville, Ontario. She died in August 2019, at the age of 58.

== Biography ==
Ruegger was born in Oshawa, Ontario in February 1961. She was inspired to run after watching the 1976 Summer Olympics in Montreal, and set herself a goal to compete at the 1980 Summer Olympics in Moscow. However, Canada was one of the many nations to boycott the games.

At the 1984 Summer Olympics in Los Angeles, Ruegger competed in the women's marathon, where she finished in eighth place, setting a new national record in the process. The following year, she won the 1985 Houston Marathon, setting another national record, one that would stand for 28 years. However, two weeks later, Ruegger was involved in a car accident. Despite this, her career lasted another eleven years, which included winning the 1987 Pittsburgh Marathon. She retired from long-distance running just before the 1996 Summer Olympics in Atlanta.

After her running career, Reugger set up a national programme, called Start2Finish, to help at-risk young people. In 2017, she was diagnosed with esophageal cancer. She died two years later, at the age of 58.

== Achievements ==
Year	Competition	Venue	Position	Event	Notes
Representing Canada
1984	National Capital Marathon	Ottawa, Ontario, Canada	1st	Marathon	2:30:37
1984	Olympic Games	Los Angeles, United States	8th	Marathon	2:29:09
1985	Houston Marathon	Houston, United States	1st	Marathon	2:28:36
1987	Pittsburgh Marathon	Pittsburgh, United States	1st	Marathon	2:31:53
