= Dharambir Singh =

Indian sprinter

Dharambir Singh Indian Sprinter
- Born: 10 December 1990 (age 35); Haryana, India
- Occupation: Sprinter
- Years active: 2016 – present

Dharambir Singh (born 10 December 1990) is an Indian sprinter, who has been banned for avoiding a compulsory drug test. In July 2016, he set a new national record in India when he won the 200 metres race at the Indian Grand Prix in Bengaluru. His time of 20.45 seconds was under the 20.50 seconds qualifying threshold for the 200 metres race in the 2016 Summer Olympics. He became the first competitor for India to qualify for the 200 metres at the Olympics in 36 years.

However, on 2 August 2016 Singh failed to board his flight to Rio de Janeiro, and was reported to have failed a drug test. The following day India's National Anti-Doping Agency announced that an unnamed athlete had failed a drug test. This would be Singh's second doping offence, and he was stripped of his 2012 National Inter-state gold medal because of not going to a compulsory drug test and also handed an eight-year ban.
