= Tatyana Titova (runner) =

Russian marathon runner

Tatyana Titova (Russian: Татьяна Титова) (born 6 August 1965) is a retired long-distance runner from Russia who has won eleven marathons during her career. Her personal best of 2:29:36 was set during her victory at the 2004 San Diego Rock 'n' Roll Marathon.

Titova is a three-time winner of the Columbus Marathon (1996, 1999, 2001) and a two-time winner of the California International Marathon (2002, 2003). She has also won a number of other marathons including the Paris Marathon (1992), the Hartford Marathon (1999), the Austin Marathon (2000), the Green Bay Marathon (2002), and the Gasparilla Distance Classic Marathon (2007).

== Achievements ==
Year	Competition	Venue	Position	Event	Notes
Representing Russia
1992	Paris Marathon	Paris, France	1st	Marathon	2:31:12
1997	Pittsburgh Marathon	Pittsburgh, United States	1st	Marathon	2:37:41
1999	Pittsburgh Marathon	Pittsburgh, United States	1st	Marathon	2:40:00
2002	California International Marathon	California State Capitol, United States	1st	Marathon	2:33:13
2003	California International Marathon	California State Capitol, United States	1st	Marathon	2:33:31
2004	Rock 'n' Roll San Diego Marathon	San Diego, United States	1st	Marathon	2:29:36
