= Matt Llano =

American long-distance runner

Personal information
- Born: Matthew Llano; August 1, 1988 (age 37) Poughkeepsie, New York, U.S.
- Height: 5 ft 9 in (175 cm)

Sport
- Country: United States
- Event(s): Half Marathon, Marathon
- College team: Richmond
- Club: Dark Sky Distance
- Turned pro: 2011

Achievements and titles
- Personal best(s): Half marathon: 1:01:47; Marathon: 2:11:14

Matthew Llano (born August 1, 1988) is an American long distance runner who competes in half marathon and marathon events. He represented his country at the 2014 IAAF World Half Marathon Championships.

== Running career ==
=== High school ===
Matt Llano was a fourth-place finisher at 2005 Maryland 4A State Cross Country Championship and an eighth place finisher at the 2004 Maryland 4A State Cross Country Championship representing Broadneck High School. He finished behind high school teammate Matthew Centrowitz Jr. as a Junior and Senior to lead their team to Maryland Public Secondary Schools Athletic Association state team titles. By the time he graduated from Broadneck, he had been named in the All-County selection on two occasions.

=== Collegiate ===
Matt Llano was an All-American in cross country for the Richmond Spiders in 2010. Matt earned 10k All-American status on the track. Matt finished third at the 2007 USA Junior outdoor national championships at IU Michael A. Carroll Track & Soccer Stadium IUPUI in Indianapolis, Indiana in the 10,000 meters with a time of 31:19.03 to earn USATF Jr. All-America honors.

=== Professional ===
In January 2014, Matt Llano ran 61:47 in Houston at the USA Half Marathon Championships to earn 5th place. At the 2014 IAAF World Half Marathon Championships on March 29, 2014 races were held in Copenhagen, Denmark, Matt Llano finished 35th. On October 22, 2015, Matt Llano ran the 2015 Berlin Marathon in a time of 2:12:28.

== Personal life ==
In 2013 Matt Llano came out as gay in his blog becoming the first openly gay professional long distance runner at that time.

== Career statistics ==
=== Track and field ===
Year	Competition	Venue	Position	Event	Notes
2007	USA junior outdoor Track and Field championships	Indianapolis, Indiana	3rd	10,000 meters	31:19.03

=== Road Racing ===
Year	Competition	Venue	Position	Event	Notes
2013	USA 20 km Championships	New Haven, CT	7th	20 km	1:01:39
2013	USA 12 km Championships ".US National 12k"	Alexandria, VA	7th	12 km	34:48
2014	USA Half Marathon Championships	Houston, Texas	5th	Half marathon	1:01:47
2015	USA Marathon Championships	Los Angeles, CA	2nd	Marathon	2:16:12
2016	US Olympic Team Trials- Marathon	Los Angeles, CA	6th	Marathon	2:15:16

== Personal best ==
- 10,000 meters: 28:43.30
- Half marathon: 1:01:47 17th fastest American half marathon all-time
- Marathon: 2:11:14
