= Marthe Katrine Myhre =

Norwegian cross-country skier (1985–2024)

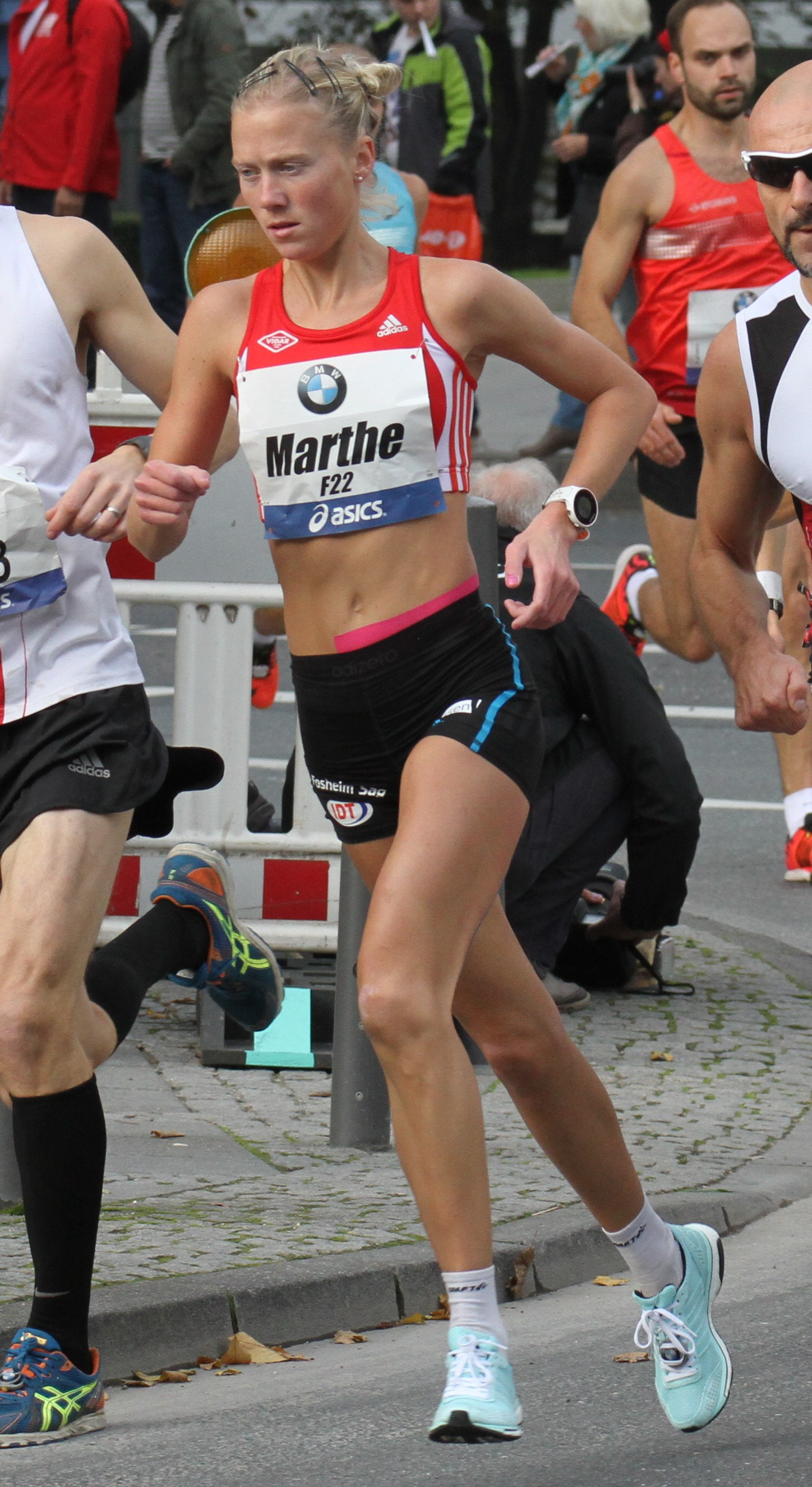
- Myhre in October 2014

Personal information
- Born: 4 March 1985 Gjøvik, Norway
- Died: 5 December 2024 (aged 39) Hunndalen, Norway

Sport
- Sport: Cross-country skiing

Marthe Katrine Myhre (4 March 1985 – 5 December 2024) was a Norwegian triathlete and cross-country skier. In triathlon she was a member of Royal sport. In cross-country skiing, Myhre represented Gjøvik and Toten cross-country skiing.

== Personal life and death ==
Myhre had an eating disorder as a teenager. She died in Hunndalen in December 2024, at the age of 39.

== Awards ==
=== Triathlon ===
- NM gold in winter triathlon
- World Championship gold (U 23) in winter triathlon

=== Marathon ===
- Norwegian National Championships gold medal in the half marathon 2013 and 2014
- Norwegian National Championships gold medal in marathon 2011, 2012, 2015, 2016 and 2018
- NM bronze medal in the NM marathon 2010

=== Uphill race ===
- NM silver in 2007

=== Cross-country skiing ===
- One Norwegian Cup race for seniors
- Participated twice in the World Cup race in Holmenkollen

=== Athletics ===
- NM bronze medal in the 10,000 meters in 2013
