= Nilay Esen Ersun =

Turkish long-distance runner

Personal information
- Born: January 3, 1987 (age 39) Antakya, Hatay Province, Turkey

Sport
- Country: Turkey
- Sport: Athletics
- Event(s): Long-distance, marathon
- Club: Bursa Büyülşehir Belediye SK

Nilay Esen Ersun (born January 3, 1987) is a Turkish female long-distance runner specialized in marathon. She is a member of Bursa Büyülşehir Belediye SK.

In 2005, she received a two-year ban from the track due to positive testing for illegal substance Metenolone.

She took part at the 2015 Hamburg Marathon in Germany, and finished in 2:37:09, meeting the qualifying time standard for Olympics. So, she earned a quota spot for women's marathon in the 2016 Summer Olympics.
