= Fernando Cabada =

American long-distance runner

Personal information
- Born: Fernando Cabada Jr. April 22, 1982 (age 44) Fresno, California

Sport
- Sport: Track, Long-distance running
- Events: Mile, 3000 meters, 5000 meters, 10,000 meters, marathon
- College team: Arkansas; Fresno State; Virginia Intermont College

Achievements and titles
- Personal bests: Mile: 4:04.34; 3000 meters: 7:57.92; 5000 meters: 13:34.92; 10,000 meters: 28:25.62; Marathon: 2:11:36
- Updated on 4-18-15

Fernando Cabada Jr. (born April 22, 1982) is an American distance runner. He first established himself in the national running scene while in high school when he was ranked among the ten fastest high school boys in the 3200 meters in the United States. Having developed a reputation as an elite prospect, he accepted a scholarship from University of Arkansas, but became disenchanted with school and attended a total of four different colleges before quitting running altogether and pursuing manual labor jobs in the early 2000s. Cabada then returned to competitive running with Virginia Intermont College coach Scott Simmons, who helped Cabada prepare for his 2006 marathon debut in Fukuoka, Japan, which he ran in 2:12:27. Since then, Cabada established himself primarily as a marathoner.

== Running career ==
=== High school ===
Cabada attended and ran with Buchanan High School of Clovis, California until he graduated in 2000. At Buchanan, Cabada ran cross country and track and established himself as one of the most formidable high school distance runners in the state of California. In cross country, he recorded 15:42 in the 5K as a junior at the 1998 CIF Cross Country Championships. He recorded a personal best 3200-meter time of 8:59.02 in his junior year at the Golden West track meet on June 11, 1999, after which he was ranked seventh in the high school boys' 3200 meters in the entire United States. In his final outdoor track season as a high school senior, he recorded a personal best time of 4:17.28 in the 1600 meters.

=== Collegiate ===
Upon finishing high school, Cabada took up an offer from Arkansas to attend school with an athletic scholarship. At the time, the Arkansas Razorbacks' prestigious cross country and track programs were headed by experienced coach John McDonnell. Cabada quickly grew disenchanted with the pressures at Arkansas and returned to his hometown to attend Fresno State. At Fresno, the cross country and track programs folded due to financial reasons, and Cabada attempted to walk-on at Arkansas, this time without a scholarship. Eventually he dropped running and, in 2003, dropped school altogether to work as a tile setter for $8 an hour. While working various labor jobs, Cabada allegedly applied to Minot State University after contacting their coach, Scott Simmons, on the internet. Simmons, however, moved to Virginia Intermont and Cabada left Fresno to follow him. The move to Virginia ultimately saved Cabada's running career; at Virginia Intermont College, he won 7 NAIA titles.

=== International ===
At the 2006 IAAF World Road Running Championships he finished 72nd. In the following year, Cabada finished 50th at the 2007 World Championships in the marathon.

At the 2014 IAAF World Half Marathon Championships, Cabada finished 46th.

=== National ===
Cadaba is a two-time winner of the US 25K national championship race. He set the national record for the distance (1:14:20) in 2006. In 2011, he was back at the top of the podium, clocking 1:15:41. He won the 2008 Twin Cities Marathon, which served as the United States National Marathon Championship for the year. He won in a time of 2:16:32.
