= Leo Garnes =

Barbadian long-distance runner

Personal information
- Full name: Leo Adolphus Garnes
- Nationality: Barbadian
- Born: 20 January 1968 (age 58)

Sport
- Sport: Long-distance running
- Event: 5000 metres

Leo Adolphus Garnes (born 20 January 1968) is a Barbadian long-distance runner. He competed in the men's 5000 metres at the 1992 Summer Olympics. In 1999, he was charged with the murders of his ex-girlfriend and her sister.
