= Urige Buta =

Norwegian athlete (born 1978)

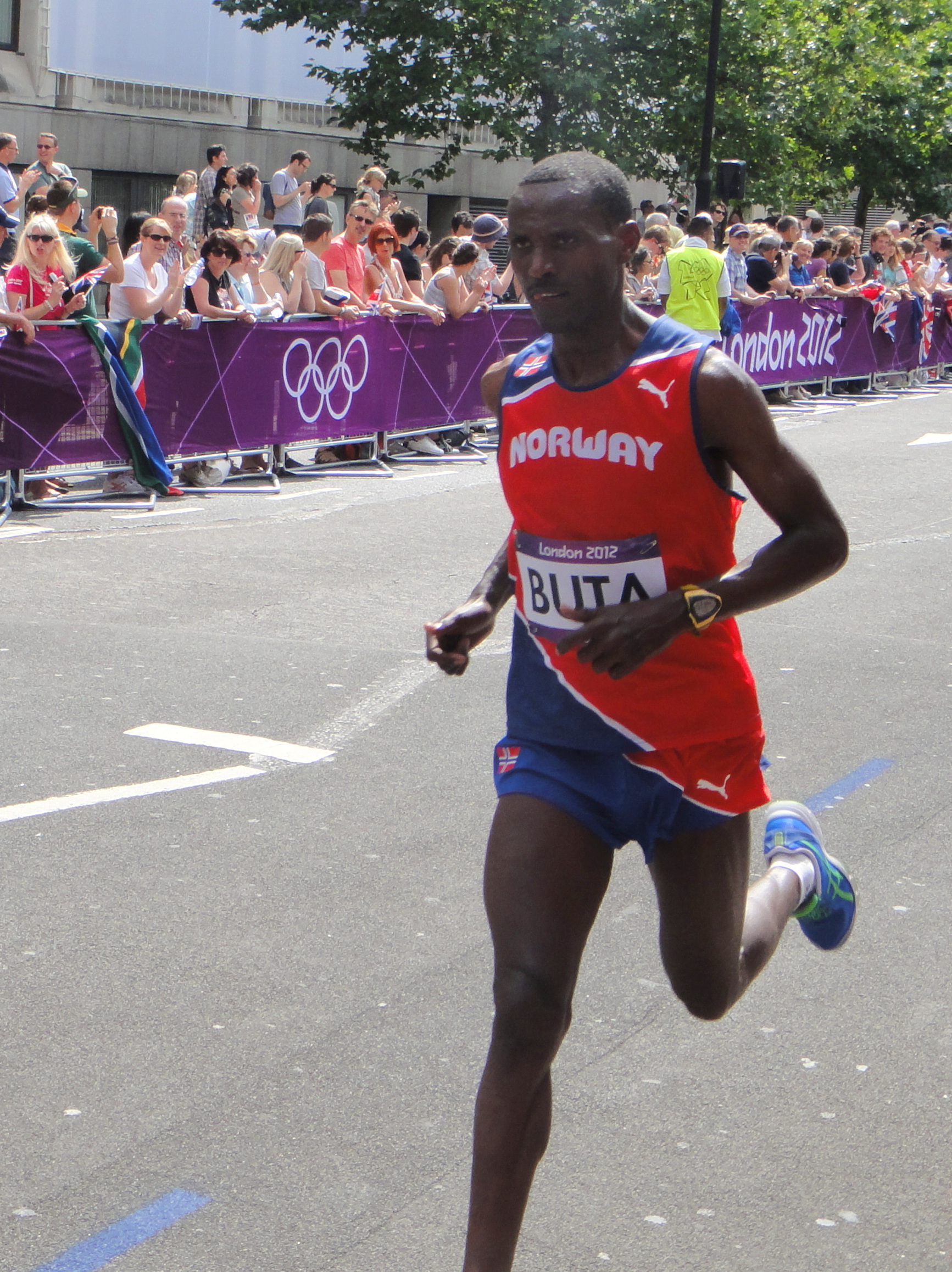
- Buta in the marathon at the 2012 Summer Olympics in London

Personal information
- Born: November 28, 1978 (age 47)

Sport
- Country: Norway
- Sport: Athletics
- Event: Marathon

Urige Buta (born 28 November 1978) is a Norwegian athlete. He was born in Ambo in the Oromiya Region, Ethiopia. He qualified for the marathon at the 2012 Summer Olympics in London, where he finished in 36th place. He was Norwegian champion in 10,000 m in 2005 and 2007.
