= Wissem Hosni =

Tunisian long-distance runner

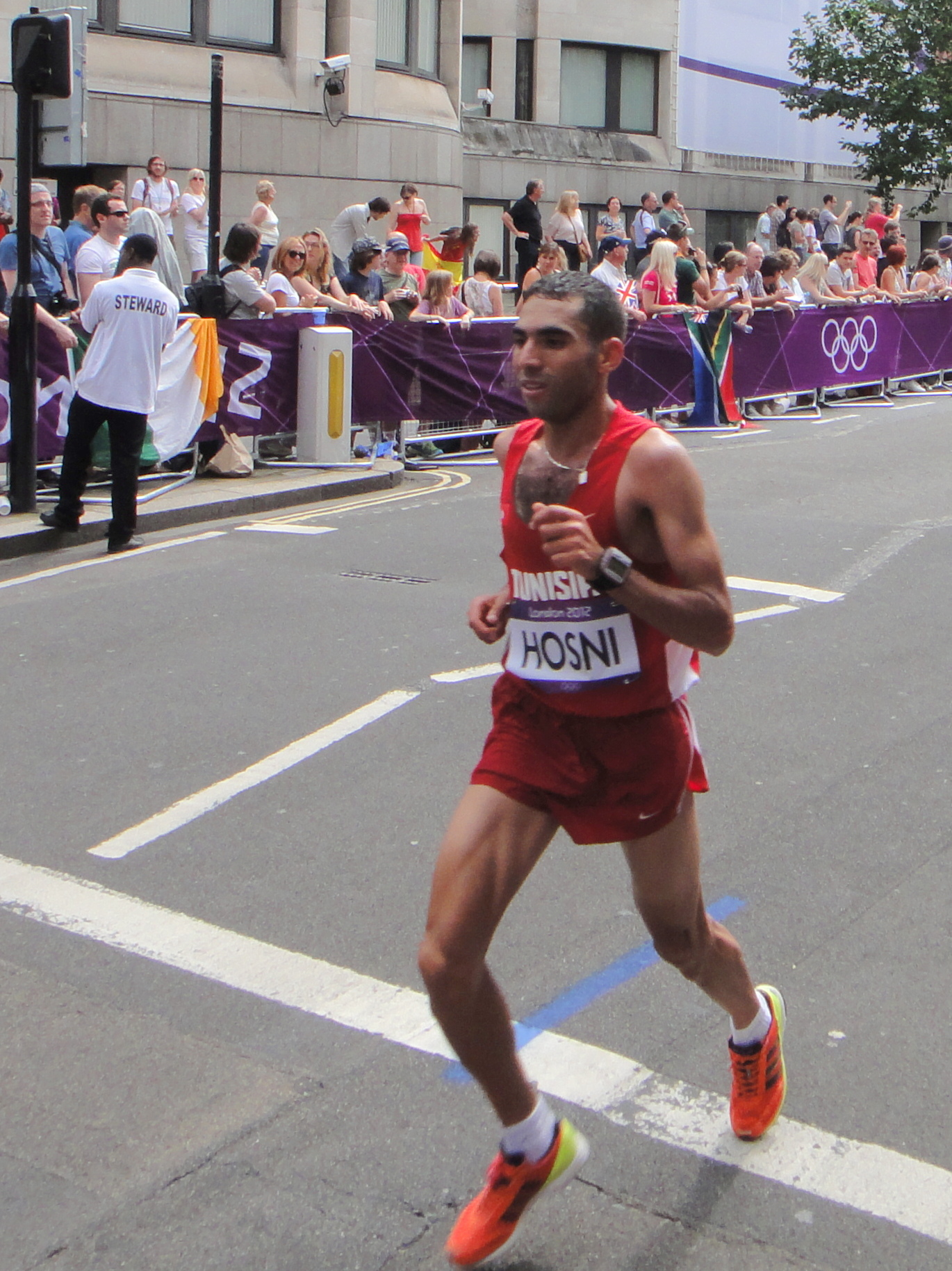
- Wissem Hosni in the marathon at the 2012 Summer Olympics in London

Personal information
- Born: March 8, 1985 (age 41)
- Height: 1.75 m (5 ft 9 in)
- Weight: 57 kg (126 lb)

Sport
- Country: Tunisia
- Sport: Athletics
- Event: Marathon
Medal record
Mediterranean Games
Silver medal – second place	2013 Mersin	Half marathon

Wissem Hosni (born 8 March 1985) is a Tunisian long-distance runner. At the 2012 Summer Olympics, he competed in the Men's marathon, finishing in 71st place. He is a three-time participant at the IAAF World Cross Country Championships, having taken part in 2010, 2011 and 2013.
