= He Yinli =

Chinese long-distance runner

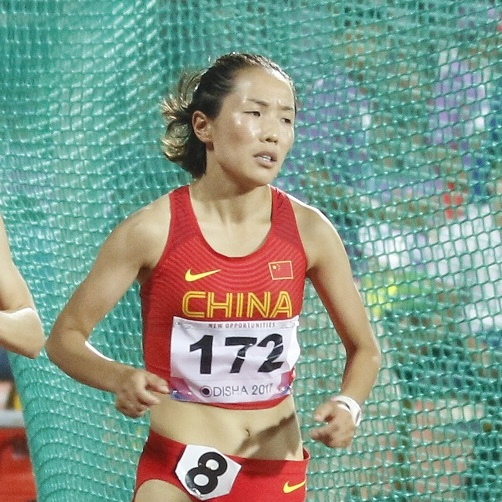
- in India in 2017

Personal information
- Born: 20 July 1988 (age 37)

Sport
- Country: China
- Sport: Track and field
- Event: long-distance running
- Updated on 2 September 2015

He Yinli (Chinese: 何引麗; born 20 July 1988 in Baotou, Inner Mongolia) is a female Chinese long-distance runner. She competed in the marathon event at the 2015 World Championships in Athletics in Beijing, China.

== See also ==
- China at the 2015 World Championships in Athletics
