= Tyler Pennel =

American long-distance runner

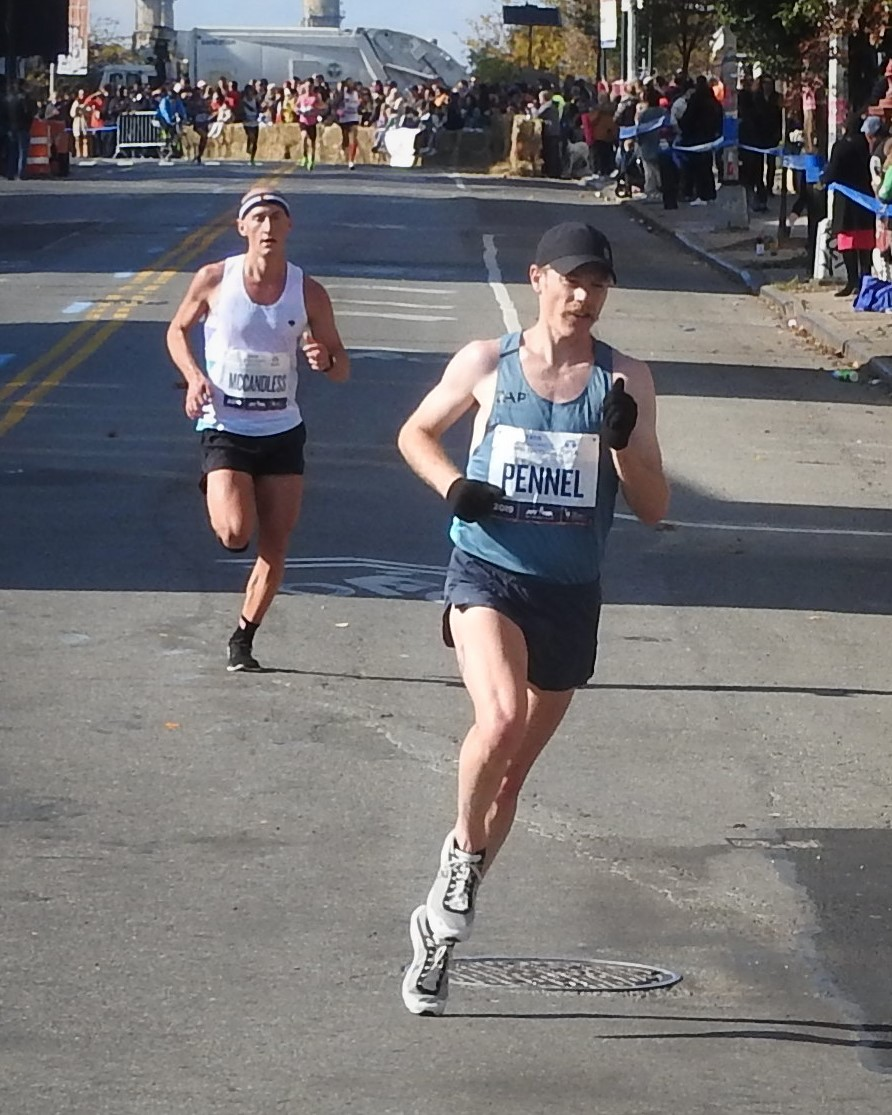
- Tyler Pennel (right)

Personal information
- Born: December 21, 1987 (age 38) Golden, Colorado, U.S.
- Height: 5 ft 11 in (1.80 m)
- Weight: 140 lb (64 kg)

Sport
- Event(s): Mile, 5000 meters, 10,000 meters, marathon
- College team: Western State

Achievements and titles
- Personal best(s): Mile: 3:58.99; 5000m: 13:32.06; 10,000m: 28:22.90 ½ marathon: 1:01:44; Marathon: 2:13:32

Tyler Pennel (born December 21, 1987) is an American distance runner. Having grown up in Colorado, he competed in cross country and track at Golden High School and subsequently at Western State College. He runs for ZAP Fitness and is known for a competitive range from the mile to the marathon.

== Running career ==
=== High school ===
Pennel attended Golden High School in Golden, Colorado, where he recorded personal bests of 4:25 in the 1600 and 9:49 in the 3200.

=== Collegiate ===
Pennel stayed in Colorado and committed to Western State College where he won an individual national title, a team national title, and was an 11-time All-American. His individual title was his first place finish in the men's 10,000 meters at the 2012 NCAA DII Outdoor T&F Championships. At Western State, Pennel trained almost always at an altitude higher than 4,000 feet.

=== Post-collegiate ===
Pennel won the 2014 Twin Cities Marathon in his marathon debut. He then competed at the 2014 IAAF World Half Marathon Championships where he finished 33rd. On June 4, 2015, Pennel ran his first sub-four minute mile at the Festival of Miles in St. Louis, where he finished second in 3:58.99.

In 2016, Pennel competed in the Olympic Marathon Trials which doubled as the USA Marathon Championships in Los Angeles where he finished 5th in 2:14:57.

Pennel planned to compete in the 5000m and 10000m trials for the 2016 Olympics but a stress fracture in April ended his Olympic plans.

In his first 2016 race back from injury, he finished 8th in the 2016 NYC Marathon, with a time of 2:15:09. He was the third American man across the finish line.
