= Bahrain at the 2018 Asian Games =

- IOC code: BRN
- NOC: Bahrain Olympic Committee
- Website: www.boc.bh

in Jakarta and Palembang August 18 – September 2
- Competitors: 101 in 13 sports
- Flag bearer: Bader Nasser
- Medals Ranked 11th: Gold 10 Silver 7 Bronze 7 Total 24

Asian Games appearances (overview)
- 1974; 1978; 1982; 1986; 1990; 1994; 1998; 2002; 2006; 2010; 2014; 2018; 2022; 2026

Bahrain participated in the 2018 Asian Games in Jakarta and Palembang, Indonesia from 18 August to 2 September 2018. Bahrain first competed at the Asian Games in 1982 Delhi, and had won 58 medals in all - 25 gold, 17 silver, and 16 bronze until the Games in 2014 Incheon.

The chef de mission of the team, Bader Nasser, was the country's flag bearer during the opening ceremony at the 2018 Games.

== Medalists ==
The following Bahrain competitors won medals at the Games.

Medal	Name	Sport	Event	Date
Gold	Hassan Chani	Athletics	Men's 10,000 metres	August 26
Gold	Edidiong Odiong	Athletics	Women's 100 metres	August 26
Gold	Salwa Eid Naser	Athletics	Women's 400 metres	August 26
Gold	Rose Chelimo	Athletics	Women's marathon	August 26
Gold	Winfred Mutile Yavi	Athletics	Women's 3000 metres steeplechase	August 27
Gold	Kalkidan Gezahegne	Athletics	Women's 5000 metres	August 28
Gold	Edidiong Odiong	Athletics	Women's 200 metres	August 29
Gold	Birhanu Balew	Athletics	Men's 5000 metres	August 30
Gold	Kalkidan Gezahegne	Athletics	Women's 1500 metres	August 30
Gold	Iman Essa Jasim; Edidiong Odiong; Salwa Eid Naser; Hajar Alkhaldi	Athletics	Women's 4 × 100 metres relay	August 30
Silver	El Hassan El-Abbassi	Athletics	Men's marathon	August 25
Silver	Eunice Chumba	Athletics	Women's 10,000 metres	August 25
Silver	Abraham Cheroben	Athletics	Men's 10,000 metres	August 26
Silver	Albert Kibichii Rop	Athletics	Men's 5000 metres	August 30
Silver	Tigist Gashaw	Athletics	Women's 1500 metres	August 30
Silver	Iman Essa Jasim; Edidiong Odiong; Salwa Eid Naser; Aminat Jamal	Athletics	Women's 4 × 400 metres relay	August 30
Silver	Ali Merza; Hasan Al-Samahiji; Isa Ahmed; Mahmood Salman; Mohamed Abdulredha; Mohamed Merza; Mohamed Abdulhusain; Bilal Basham; Hasan Madan; Husain Mohamed; Komail Mahfoodh; Jasim Al-Salatna; Ali Salman; Hasan Al-Fardan; Mohamed Habib; Husain Al-Sayyad	Handball	Men's tournament	August 31
Bronze	Ali Khamis	Athletics	Men's 400 metres	August 26
Bronze	Noora Salem Jasim	Athletics	Women's shot put	August 26
Bronze	Aminat Jamal	Athletics	Women's 400 metres hurdles	August 27
Bronze	Manal El Bahraoui	Athletics	Women's 800 metres	August 28
Bronze	Bontu Rebitu	Athletics	Women's 5000 metres	August 28
Bronze	Salem Eid Yaqoob	Athletics	Men's 200 metres	August 29
Bronze	Mohammed Ayoub Tiouali	Athletics	Men's 1500 metres	August 30

== Competitors ==
The following is a list of the number of competitors representing Bahrain that participated at the Games:

Sport	Men	Women	Total
Athletics	18	17	35
Bowling	6	0	6
Cycling	1	1	2
Equestrian	4	0	4
Football	20	0	20
Handball	16	0	16
Ju-jitsu	5	0	5
Sailing	1	0	1
Sambo	1	0	1
Shooting	3	4	7
Taekwondo	1	0	1
Triathlon	1	1	2
Wrestling	1	0	1
Total	78	23	101

== Bowling ==
Men

Athlete	Event	Block 1	Block 2	Total	Rank
Athlete	Event	Result	Result	Total	Rank
Ahmed Alawadhi; Osama Hasan; Yousif Falah	Trios	2039	1988	4027	15
Ahmed Algoud; Omar Almudhahki; Abdulla Ali	Trios	1991	1808	3799	24
Ahmed Alawadhi; Osama Hasan; Yousif Falah; Ahmed Algoud; Omar Almudhahki; Abdulla Ali	Team of six	3906	3957	7863	12

== Cycling ==
=== Road ===
Athlete	Event	Final	
Athlete	Event	Time	Rank
Yahiaaldien Khalefa	Men's road race	DNS	—
Razan Soboh	Women's road race	DNF	—
Razan Soboh	Women's time trial	37:24.51	12

=== Track ===
Pursuit

Athlete	Event	Qualification		Final	
Athlete	Event	Time	Rank	Opposition Time	Rank
Yahiaaldien Khalefa	Men's pursuit	5:03.289	13	did not advance	

Omnium

Athlete	Event	Scratch race		Tempo race		Elimination race		Points race		Total points	Rank
Athlete	Event	Rank	Points	Rank	Points	Rank	Points	Rank	Points	Total points	Rank
Yahiaaldien Khalefa	Men's omnium	18	6	18	−20	14	14	—	DNF	DNF	—

== Equestrian ==
Jumping

Athlete	Horse	Event	Qualification		Qualifier 1			Qualifier 2 Team Final			Final round A			Final round B		
Athlete	Horse	Event	Points	Rank	Penalties	Total	Rank	Penalties	Total	Rank	Penalties	Total	Rank	Penalties	Total	Rank
Sayed Adnan Al-Alawi	Baluu	Individual	9.19	37	6	15.19	33 Q	15	30.19	41 Q	9	39.19	32	did not advance		
Shaikh Hasan Al-Khalifa	Aw Vivika	Individual	11.78	45	8	19.78	41 Q	12	31.78	43 Q	4	35.78	28 Q	28	63.78	23
Khaled Al-Khatri	Sierra	Individual	Eliminated #		4	47.85	57	did not advance								
Ahmed Maki	Consuela van Verst	Individual	Eliminated		Eliminated #			did not advance								
Ahmed Maki; Shaikh Hasan Al-Khalifa; Sayed Adnan Al-Alawi; Khaled Al-Khatri	See above	Team	64.82	16	18	82.82	14	did not advance			—					

# – indicates that the score of this rider does not count in the team competition, since only the best three results of a team are counted.

== Football ==
Bahrain national men's team drawn in group E at the Games.

Summary

Team	Event	Group Stage				Round of 16	Quarterfinal	Semifinal	Final / BM	
Team	Event	Opposition Score	Opposition Score	Opposition Score	Rank	Opposition Score	Opposition Score	Opposition Score	Opposition Score	Rank
Bahrain men's	Men's tournament	South Korea; L 0–6	Kyrgyzstan; D 2–2	Malaysia; W 3–2	3 Q	Vietnam; L 0–1	did not advance			16

=== Men's tournament ===
Roster

The following is the Bahrain squad in the men's football tournament of the 2018 Asian Games.

Head coach: (Tunisia) Samir Chammam

No.	Pos.	Player	Date of birth (age)	Caps	Goals	Club
1	GK	Abdulaziz Al-Kandari	16 September 1997 (aged 20)			(Bahrain) Isa Town
19	GK	Ammar Ahmed	10 February 1999 (aged 19)			(Bahrain) Manama
20	GK	Yusuf Habib	9 January 1998 (aged 20)			(Bahrain) Malkiya
2	DF	Sayed Mohamed Ameen	7 March 1999 (aged 19)			(Bahrain) Sitra
3	DF	Ahmed Bughammar	30 December 1997 (aged 20)			(Bahrain) Al-Hidd
4	DF	Husain Jameel	3 October 1997 (aged 20)			(Bahrain) Al-Shabab
5	DF	Hamad Al-Shamsan	29 September 1997 (aged 20)			(Bahrain) Al-Riffa
6	DF	Abbas Al-Khayyat	15 October 1997 (aged 20)			(Bahrain) East Riffa
15	DF	Hasan Al-Karani	27 November 1997 (aged 20)			(Bahrain) Sitra
7	MF	Hasan Yahya Ali	29 November 1997 (aged 20)			(Bahrain) Al-Tadamun Buri
8	MF	Mohamed Jasim Marhoon	12 February 1998 (aged 20)			(Bahrain) Al-Riffa
9	MF	Saleh Sanad	11 January 1998 (aged 20)			(Bahrain) Isa Town
10	MF	Mohammed Al-Hardan (captain)	6 October 1997 (aged 20)			(Denmark) Vejle Boldklub
11	MF	Abdulaziz Al-Mansoori	17 March 1997 (aged 21)			(Bahrain) Al-Najma
12	MF	Jasim Al-Salama	22 February 1998 (aged 20)			(Bahrain) East Riffa
14	MF	Abbas Al-Asfoor	2 March 1999 (aged 19)			(Bahrain) Al-Shabab
18	MF	Abdulrahman Ahmadi	16 April 1998 (aged 20)			(Bahrain) Al-Muharraq
13	FW	Sayed Ebrahim	25 October 1997 (aged 20)			(Bahrain) Al-Shabab
16	FW	Sayed Hashim Isa	3 April 1998 (aged 20)			(Bahrain) Malkiya
17	FW	Ahmed Al-Sherooqi	22 May 2000 (aged 18)			(Bahrain) Al-Budaiya

* Over-aged player.

Group E

Pos	Team	Pld	W	D	L	GF	GA	GD	Pts	Qualification
1	Malaysia	3	2	0	1	7	5	+2	6 (Note: Head-to-head result: Malaysia 2–1 South Korea.)	Advance to knockout stage
2	South Korea	3	2	0	1	8	2	+6	6	Advance to knockout stage
3	Bahrain	3	1	1	1	5	10	−5	4	Advance to knockout stage
4	Kyrgyzstan	3	0	1	2	3	6	−3	1	
5	United Arab Emirates	0	0	0	0	0	0	0	0	Redrawn to Group C

Source: Asian Games 2018
Rules for classification: Group stage tiebreakers
Notes:
15 August 2018
19:00 UTC+7

South Korea	6–0	Bahrain
Hwang Ui-jo 17', 36', 43'; Kim Jin-ya 23'; Na Sang-ho 41'; Hwang Hee-chan 90+3'	Report

Jalak Harupat Stadium, Soreang
Referee: Takuto Okabe (Japan)

17 August 2018
16:00 UTC+7

Bahrain	2–2	Kyrgyzstan
Marhoon 20'; Sanad 90+4'	Report	Abdurakhmanov 59'; Batyrkanov 82'

Jalak Harupat Stadium, Soreang
Referee: Nivon Robesh Gamini (Sri Lanka)

20 August 2018
19:00 UTC+7

Malaysia	2–3	Bahrain
Syahmi 20'; Safawi 90+3' (pen.)	Report	Al-Hardan 33', 89'; Al-Shamsan 37'

Wibawa Mukti Stadium, Cikarang
Referee: Yu Ming-hsun (Chinese Taipei)

Round of 16

23 August 2018
19:30 UTC+7

Vietnam	1–0	Bahrain
Nguyễn Công Phượng 88'	Report

Patriot Candrabhaga Stadium, Bekasi
Referee: Zhang Lei (China)

== Handball ==
Bahrain men's team entered the competition and join in group D.

Summary

Key:

- ET – After extra time
- P – Match decided by penalty-shootout.

Team	Event	Preliminary	Standing	Main / Class.	Rank / standing	Semifinals / Pl.	Final / BM / Pl.	
Team	Event	Opposition score	Standing	Opposition score	Rank / standing	Opposition score	Opposition score	Rank
Bahrain men's	Men's tournament	Group D Iraq: W 30–24; India: W 32–25; Chinese Taipei: W 37–21	1 Q	Group II; Iran: W 29–23; South Korea: W 27–25; Hong Kong W 43–19:	1 Q	Japan; W 30–21	Qatar; L 25–25 ^{ET: 2–7}	2nd place, silver medalist(s)

=== Men's tournament ===
Roster

- Ali Merza
- Hasan Al-Samahiji
- Isa Ahmed
- Mahmood Salman
- Mohamed Abdulredha
- Mohamed Merza Ali
- Mohamed Ali
- Bilal Askani
- Hasan Madan
- Husain Mohamed
- Komail Mahfoodh
- Jasim Al-Salatna
- Salman Ali
- Hasan Al-Fardan
- Mohamed Ahmed
- Husain Al-Sayyad

Group D

Pos	Team	Pld	W	D	L	GF	GA	GD	Pts	Qualification
1	Bahrain	3	3	0	0	99	70	+29	6	Main round / Group 1–2
2	Iraq	3	2	0	1	101	89	+12	4	Main round / Group 1–2
3	Chinese Taipei	3	1	0	2	89	102	−13	2	Main round / Group 3
4	India	3	0	0	3	82	110	−28	0	Main round / Group 3

Source: AHF

13 August; 14:00	Iraq	24–30	Bahrain	POPKI Sports Hall, Jakarta; Referees: Hizaki, Ikebuchi (JPN)
13 August; 14:00	Hammoudi 5	(16–12)	Al-Samahiji, Al-Sayyad 5	POPKI Sports Hall, Jakarta; Referees: Hizaki, Ikebuchi (JPN)
13 August; 14:00	1× (yellow card) 3× (suspension)		1× (yellow card) 4× (suspension)	POPKI Sports Hall, Jakarta; Referees: Hizaki, Ikebuchi (JPN)

15 August; 20:00	India	25–32	Bahrain	POPKI Sports Hall, Jakarta; Referees: Al-Saqer, Al-Suqufi (KSA)
15 August; 20:00	Ahlawat 6	(11–18)	Habib 6	POPKI Sports Hall, Jakarta; Referees: Al-Saqer, Al-Suqufi (KSA)
15 August; 20:00	2× (yellow card) 4× (suspension)		3× (yellow card) 5× (suspension)	POPKI Sports Hall, Jakarta; Referees: Al-Saqer, Al-Suqufi (KSA)

17 August; 20:00	Bahrain	37–21	Chinese Taipei	POPKI Sports Hall, Jakarta; Referees: Tavakkoli, Valadkhanian (IRI)
17 August; 20:00	Al-Samahiji 6	(18–10)	Pan E.C. 8	POPKI Sports Hall, Jakarta; Referees: Tavakkoli, Valadkhanian (IRI)
17 August; 20:00	4× (yellow card) 3× (suspension)		4× (yellow card) 2× (suspension)	POPKI Sports Hall, Jakarta; Referees: Tavakkoli, Valadkhanian (IRI)

Main round (Group II)

Pos	Team	Pld	W	D	L	GF	GA	GD	Pts	Qualification
1	Bahrain	3	3	0	0	99	67	+32	6	Semifinals
2	South Korea	3	2	0	1	99	70	+29	4	Semifinals
3	Iran	3	1	0	2	97	83	+14	2	Classification 5th–6th
4	Hong Kong	3	0	0	3	54	129	−75	0	Classification 7th–8th

Source: AHF

20 August; 14:00	Bahrain	29–23	Iran	POPKI Sports Hall, Jakarta; Referees: Shakir, Kadhim (IRQ)
20 August; 14:00	A. Abdulqader 7	(16–13)	Sadeghi 8	POPKI Sports Hall, Jakarta; Referees: Shakir, Kadhim (IRQ)
20 August; 14:00	1× (yellow card) 4× (suspension) 2× (red card)		2× (yellow card) 6× (suspension)	POPKI Sports Hall, Jakarta; Referees: Shakir, Kadhim (IRQ)

22 August; 14:00	South Korea	25–27	Bahrain	POPKI Sports Hall, Jakarta; Referees: Hizaki, Ikebuchi (JPN)
22 August; 14:00	Yoon C.Y. 7	(11–13)	Al-Sayyad 8	POPKI Sports Hall, Jakarta; Referees: Hizaki, Ikebuchi (JPN)
22 August; 14:00	1× (yellow card) 6× (suspension) 1× (red card)		3× (yellow card) 6× (suspension)	POPKI Sports Hall, Jakarta; Referees: Hizaki, Ikebuchi (JPN)

24 August; 14:00	Bahrain	43–19	Hong Kong	POPKI Sports Hall, Jakarta; Referees: Al-Saqer, Al-Suqufi (KSA)
24 August; 14:00	M. Abdulqader 14	(21–11)	Kuo S.M. 6	POPKI Sports Hall, Jakarta; Referees: Al-Saqer, Al-Suqufi (KSA)
24 August; 14:00	3× (yellow card)		1× (suspension)	POPKI Sports Hall, Jakarta; Referees: Al-Saqer, Al-Suqufi (KSA)

Semifinal

27 August; 18:00	Bahrain	31–20	Japan	POPKI Sports Hall, Jakarta; Referees: Tavakkoli, Valadkhanian (IRI)
27 August; 18:00	Al-Sayyad 10	(15–9)	Watanabe 7	POPKI Sports Hall, Jakarta; Referees: Tavakkoli, Valadkhanian (IRI)
27 August; 18:00	2× (yellow card) 4× (suspension)		2× (yellow card) 1× (suspension)	POPKI Sports Hall, Jakarta; Referees: Tavakkoli, Valadkhanian (IRI)

Gold medal game

31 August
18:00
Qatar
32–27 (ET)
Bahrain
POPKI Sports Hall, Jakarta
Referees: Hizaki, Ikebuchi (JPN)
Zouaoui 7
(13–14)
Al-Sayyad 5
3× (yellow card) 3× (suspension)

4× (yellow card) 5× (suspension)

FT: 25–25 ET: 7–2

== Ju-jitsu ==
Bahrain entered the ju-jitsu competition with 5 men's athletes.

Key:

- ADV – Won by advantages.
- RDC – Won by referee decision.
- SUB – Won by submission.

Men

Athlete	Event	Round of 64	Round of 32	Round of 16	Quarterfinals	Semifinals	Repechage	Final / BM	Rank
Athlete	Event	Opposition Result	Opposition Result	Opposition Result	Opposition Result	Opposition Result	Opposition Result	Opposition Result	Rank
Mohamed Abu-Drees	–62 kg	—	D Nortayev (KAZ); L 0–2	did not advance					
Abdulla Munfaredi	–62 kg	—	O Al-Fadhli (UAE); L 2–4	did not advance					
Maitham Sabba	–69 kg	—	K Muminov (UZB); L 2–5	did not advance					
Nijad Al-Qosaibi	–77 kg	Bye	A Rehman (PAK); W 100^{SUB}–0	B Erkhbayar (MGL); L 0–100^{SUB}	did not advance				
Mohamed Ghareeb	–94 kg	—	Lin C-c (TPE); W 0^{RDC}–0	F Al-Ketbi (UAE); L 0–3	did not advance				

== Sailing ==
Men

Athlete	Event	Race												Total	Rank
Athlete	Event	1	2	3	4	5	6	7	8	9	10	11	12	Total	Rank
Abdulla Janahi	Laser	~~(9)~~	8	8	9	8	5	8	6	6	9	7	5	79	8

== Sambo ==
Key:
- SU – Won by submission.

Athlete	Event	Round of 32	Round of 16	Quarterfinal	Semifinal	Repechage 1	Repechage 2	Repechage final	Final / BM	
Athlete	Event	Opposition Result	Opposition Result	Opposition Result	Opposition Result	Opposition Result	Opposition Result	Opposition Result	Opposition Result	Rank
Murtaz Ali	Men's 90 kg	A Aitbek (KAZ); L 4–4 ^{Dsq}	did not advance			R Esgerow (TKM); L ^{Dsq}	did not advance			

== Shooting ==
Bahrain has including seven shooters (3 men's and 4 women's) under coach Thanin Thaislilp, Iordan Mitov and Valeriy Timokhinto to compete at the Games.

Men

Athlete	Event	Qualification		Final	
Athlete	Event	Points	Rank	Points	Rank
Husain Ali	10 m air rifle	617.7	20	did not advance	
Mahmood Haji	10 m air rifle	623.6	9	did not advance	
Husain Ali	50 m rifle three positions	1142	21	did not advance	
Mahmood Haji	50 m rifle three positions	1149	17	did not advance	
Mahmood Haji	300 m standard rifle	—		537	11
Hasan Mohamed	Skeet	118	17	did not advance	

Women

Athlete	Event	Qualification		Final	
Athlete	Event	Points	Rank	Points	Rank
Safa Aldoseri	10 m air rifle	610.7	28	did not advance	
Hanan Rahma	10 m air rifle	610.3	31	did not advance	
Safa Aldoseri	50 m rifle three positions	1145	19	did not advance	
Sara Aldoseri	50 m rifle three positions	1122	29	did not advance	
Maryam Hassani	Skeet	105	16	did not advance	

== Taekwondo ==
Kyorugi

Athlete	Event	Round of 32	Round of 16	Quarterfinal	Semifinal	Final	
Athlete	Event	Opposition Score	Opposition Score	Opposition Score	Opposition Score	Opposition Score	Rank
Abdulla Al-Ahmed	Men's −68 kg	Arven Alcantara (PHI)	did not advance				

== Triathlon ==
Bahrain triathletes competed in the individual event at the Games.

Individual

Athlete	Event	Swim (1.5 km)	Trans 1	Bike (39.6 km)	Trans 2	Run (10 km)	Total Time	Rank
Omar Ali	Men's	21:55	0:31	1:03:07	0:30	39:25	2:05:28	22
Sameera Albitar	Women's	21:11	0:33	1:08:04	0:25	51:35	2:21:48	13

== Wrestling ==
Bahrain wrestler Adam Batirov will participate in freestyle −74 kg event.

Key:

- VT – Victory by fall.
- PP – Decision by points – the loser with technical points.
- PO – Decision by points – the loser without technical points.
- ST – Great superiority – the loser without technical points and a margin of victory of at least 8 (Greco-Roman) or 10 (freestyle) points.

Men's freestyle

Athlete	Event	Qualification	Round of 16	Quarterfinal	Semifinal	Repechage 1	Repechage 2	Final / BM	
Athlete	Event	Opposition Result	Opposition Result	Opposition Result	Opposition Result	Opposition Result	Opposition Result	Opposition Result	Rank
Adam Batirov	−74 kg	S Kumar (IND); W 5–3	A G Qaderi (AFG); W 15–5	Y Fujinama (JPN); L 2–8	did not advance				7
