= Athletics at the 2018 Asian Games =

- Venue: Gelora Bung Karno Stadium
- Dates: 25–30 August 2018
- Competitors: 688 from 43 nations

Athletics at the 2018 Asian Games was held at Gelora Bung Karno Stadium, Jakarta, Indonesia from 25 to 30 August 2018.

== Schedule ==
●	1st day	●	Final day	H	Heats	Q	Qualification	S	Semifinals	F	Final

Event↓/Date →	25th Sat		26th Sun		27th Mon	28th Tue		29th Wed	30th Thu
Men's 100 m	H		S	F					
Men's 200 m						H	S	F	
Men's 400 m	H	S	F						
Men's 800 m					H	F			
Men's 1500 m								H	F
Men's 5000 m									F
Men's 10,000 m			F						
Men's 110 m hurdles					H	F			
Men's 400 m hurdles			H		F				
Men's 3000 m steeplechase					F				
Men's 4 × 100 m relay								H	F
Men's 4 × 400 m relay								H	F
Men's marathon	F								
Men's 20 km walk								F	
Men's 50 km walk									F
Men's high jump	Q				F				
Men's pole vault								F	
Men's long jump	Q		F						
Men's triple jump								F	
Men's shot put	F								
Men's discus throw								F	
Men's hammer throw			F						
Men's javelin throw					F				
Men's decathlon	●		●						
Women's 100 m	H		S	F					
Women's 200 m						H	S	F	
Women's 400 m	H		F						
Women's 800 m					H	F			
Women's 1500 m									F
Women's 5000 m						F			
Women's 10,000 m	F								
Women's 100 m hurdles	H		F						
Women's 400 m hurdles			H		F				
Women's 3000 m steeplechase					F				
Women's 4 × 100 m relay								H	F
Women's 4 × 400 m relay									F
Women's marathon			F						
Women's 20 km walk								F	
Women's high jump								F	
Women's pole vault						F			
Women's long jump					F				
Women's triple jump									F
Women's shot put			F						
Women's discus throw									F
Women's hammer throw	F								
Women's javelin throw						F			
Women's heptathlon						●		●	
Mixed 4 × 400 m relay						F			

== Medalists ==
=== Men ===
Event	Gold		Silver		Bronze	
100 m	Su Bingtian; China	9.92; GR	Tosin Ogunode; Qatar	10.00	Ryota Yamagata; Japan	10.00
200 m	Yuki Koike; Japan	20.23	Yang Chun-han; Chinese Taipei	20.23	Yaqoob Salem Yaqoob; Bahrain	20.55
400 m	Abdalelah Haroun; Qatar	44.89	Muhammed Anas; India	45.69	Ali Khamis; Bahrain	45.70
800 m	Manjit Singh; India	1:46.15	Jinson Johnson; India	1:46.35	Abubaker Haydar Abdalla; Qatar	1:46.38
1500 m	Jinson Johnson; India	3:44.72	Amir Moradi; Iran	3:45.62	Mohammed Tiouali; Bahrain	3:45.88
5000 m	Birhanu Balew; Bahrain	13:43.17	Albert Rop; Bahrain	13:43.76	Tariq Al-Amri; Saudi Arabia	13:56.49
10,000 m	Abraham Cheroben; Bahrain	29:00.29	Zhao Changhong; China	30:07.49	Kieran Tuntivate; Thailand	30:29.04
110 m hurdles	Xie Wenjun; China	13.34	Chen Kuei-ru; Chinese Taipei	13.39	Shunya Takayama; Japan	13.48
400 m hurdles	Abderrahman Samba; Qatar	47.66; GR	Dharun Ayyasamy; India	48.96	Takatoshi Abe; Japan	49.12
3000 m steeplechase	Hossein Keyhani; Iran	8:22.79; GR	Yaser Bagharab; Qatar	8:28.21	Kazuya Shiojiri; Japan	8:29.42
4 × 100 m relay	Japan; Ryota Yamagata; Shuhei Tada; Yoshihide Kiryu; Asuka Cambridge	38.16	Indonesia; Mohammad Fadlin; Lalu Muhammad Zohri; Eko Rimbawan; Bayu Kertanegara	38.77	China; Xu Haiyang; Mi Hong; Su Bingtian; Xu Zhouzheng	38.89
4 × 400 m relay	Qatar; Abderrahman Samba; Mohamed Nasir Abbas; Mohamed El-Nour; Abdalelah Haroun	3:00.56; AR	India; Kunhu Muhammed; Dharun Ayyasamy; Muhammed Anas; Arokia Rajiv; K. S. Jeevan; Jithu Baby	3:01.85	Japan; Julian Walsh; Yuki Koike; Takatoshi Abe; Shota Iizuka; Jun Kimura; Sho Kawamoto	3:01.94
Marathon	Hiroto Inoue; Japan	2:18:22	El-Hassan El-Abbassi; Bahrain	2:18:22	Duo Bujie; China	2:18:48
20 km walk	Wang Kaihua; China	1:22:04	Toshikazu Yamanishi; Japan	1:22:10	Jin Xiangqian; China	1:25:41
50 km walk	Hayato Katsuki; Japan	4:03:30	Wang Qin; China	4:06:48	Joo Hyun-myeong; South Korea	4:10:21
High jump	Wang Yu; China	2.30	Woo Sang-hyeok; South Korea	2.28	Majdeddin Ghazal; Syria	2.24
High jump	Wang Yu; China	2.30	Woo Sang-hyeok; South Korea	2.28	Naoto Tobe; Japan	2.24
Pole vault	Seito Yamamoto; Japan	5.70; GR	Yao Jie; China	5.50	Patsapong Amsam-ang; Thailand	5.50
Long jump	Wang Jianan; China	8.24; GR	Zhang Yaoguang; China	8.15	Sapwaturrahman; Indonesia	8.09
Triple jump	Arpinder Singh; India	16.77	Ruslan Kurbanov; Uzbekistan	16.62	Cao Shuo; China	16.56
Shot put	Tajinderpal Singh Toor; India	20.75; GR	Liu Yang; China	19.52	Ivan Ivanov; Kazakhstan	19.40
Discus throw	Ehsan Haddadi; Iran	65.71	Mustafa Kadhim; Iraq	60.09	Essa Al-Zenkawi; Kuwait	59.44
Hammer throw	Ashraf Amgad El-Seify; Qatar	76.88	Dilshod Nazarov; Tajikistan	74.16	Suhrob Khodjaev; Uzbekistan	74.06
Javelin throw	Neeraj Chopra; India	88.06	Liu Qizhen; China	82.22	Arshad Nadeem; Pakistan	80.75
Decathlon	Keisuke Ushiro; Japan	7878	Sutthisak Singkhon; Thailand	7809	Akihiko Nakamura; Japan	7738

=== Women ===
Event	Gold		Silver		Bronze	
100 m	Edidiong Odiong; Bahrain	11.30	Dutee Chand; India	11.32	Wei Yongli; China	11.33
200 m	Edidiong Odiong; Bahrain	22.96	Dutee Chand; India	23.20	Wei Yongli; China	23.27
400 m	Salwa Eid Naser; Bahrain	50.09; GR	Hima Das; India	50.79	Elina Mikhina; Kazakhstan	52.63
800 m	Wang Chunyu; China	2:01.80	Margarita Mukasheva; Kazakhstan	2:02.40	Manal El-Bahraoui; Bahrain	2:02.69
1500 m	Kalkidan Gezahegne; Bahrain	4:07.88	Tigist Gashaw; Bahrain	4:09.12	P. U. Chitra; India	4:12.56
5000 m	Kalkidan Gezahegne; Bahrain	15:08.08	Darya Maslova; Kyrgyzstan	15:30.57	Bontu Rebitu; Bahrain	15:36.78
10,000 m	Darya Maslova; Kyrgyzstan	32:07.23	Eunice Chumba; Bahrain	32:11.12	Zhang Deshun; China	32:12.78
100 m hurdles	Jung Hye-lim; South Korea	13.20	Emilia Nova; Indonesia	13.33	Lui Lai Yiu; Hong Kong	13.42
400 m hurdles	Quách Thị Lan; Vietnam	55.30	Aminat Yusuf Jamal; Bahrain	55.65	Anu Raghavan; India	56.92
3000 m steeplechase	Winfred Yavi; Bahrain	9:36.52	Sudha Singh; India	9:40.03	Nguyễn Thị Oanh; Vietnam	9:43.83
4 × 100 m relay	Bahrain; Iman Essa Jasim; Edidiong Odiong; Hajar Al-Khaldi; Salwa Eid Naser	42.73; GR	China; Liang Xiaojing; Wei Yongli; Ge Manqi; Yuan Qiqi; Huang Guifen; Kong Lingwei	42.84	Kazakhstan; Viktoriya Zyabkina; Elina Mikhina; Svetlana Golendova; Olga Safronova; Rima Kashafutdinova	43.82
4 × 400 m relay	India; Hima Das; M. R. Poovamma; Sarita Gayakwad; V. K. Vismaya	3:28.72	Bahrain; Aminat Yusuf Jamal; Iman Essa Jasim; Edidiong Odiong; Salwa Eid Naser	3:30.61	Vietnam; Nguyễn Thị Oanh; Nguyễn Thị Hằng; Hoàng Thị Ngọc; Quách Thị Lan	3:33.23
Marathon	Rose Chelimo; Bahrain	2:34:51	Keiko Nogami; Japan	2:36:27	Choi Kyung-sun; South Korea	2:37:49
20 km walk	Yang Jiayu; China	1:29:15; GR	Qieyang Shijie; China	1:29:15 =GR	Kumiko Okada; Japan	1:34:02
High jump	Svetlana Radzivil; Uzbekistan	1.96; GR	Nadiya Dusanova; Uzbekistan	1.94	Nadezhda Dubovitskaya; Kazakhstan	1.84
Pole vault	Li Ling; China	4.60; GR	Chayanisa Chomchuendee; Thailand	4.30	Lim Eun-ji; South Korea	4.20
Long jump	Bùi Thị Thu Thảo; Vietnam	6.55	Neena Varakil; India	6.51	Xu Xiaoling; China	6.50
Triple jump	Olga Rypakova; Kazakhstan	14.26	Parinya Chuaimaroeng; Thailand	13.93	Vũ Thị Mến; Vietnam	13.93
Shot put	Gong Lijiao; China	19.66	Gao Yang; China	17.64	Noora Salem Jasim; Bahrain	17.11
Discus throw	Chen Yang; China	65.12	Feng Bin; China	64.25	Seema Punia; India	62.26
Hammer throw	Luo Na; China	71.42	Wang Zheng; China	70.86	Hitomi Katsuyama; Japan	62.95
Javelin throw	Liu Shiying; China	66.09; GR	Lü Huihui; China	63.16	Gim Gyeong-ae; South Korea	56.74
Heptathlon	Swapna Barman; India	6026	Wang Qingling; China	5954	Yuki Yamasaki; Japan	5873

=== Mixed ===
Event	Gold		Silver		Bronze	
4 × 400 m relay	India; Muhammed Anas; M. R. Poovamma; Hima Das; Arokia Rajiv	3:15.71	Kazakhstan; Svetlana Golendova; Dmitriy Koblov; Elina Mikhina; Mikhail Litvin	3:19.52	China; Cheng Chong; Yang Lei; Huang Guifen; Wu Yuang	3:19.91

== Medal table ==
Rank	Nation	Gold	Silver	Bronze	Total
1	China (CHN)	12	13	9	34
2	Bahrain (BRN)	10	6	6	22
3	India (IND)	8	9	3	20
4	Japan (JPN)	6	2	10	18
5	Qatar (QAT)	4	2	1	7
6	Iran (IRI)	2	1	0	3
7	Vietnam (VIE)	2	0	3	5
8	Kazakhstan (KAZ)	1	2	4	7
9	Uzbekistan (UZB)	1	2	1	4
10	South Korea (KOR)	1	1	4	6
11	Kyrgyzstan (KGZ)	1	1	0	2
12	Thailand (THA)	0	3	2	5
13	Indonesia (INA)	0	2	1	3
14	Chinese Taipei (TPE)	0	2	0	2
15	Iraq (IRQ)	0	1	0	1
15	Tajikistan (TJK)	0	1	0	1
17	Hong Kong (HKG)	0	0	1	1
17	Kuwait (KUW)	0	0	1	1
17	Pakistan (PAK)	0	0	1	1
17	Saudi Arabia (KSA)	0	0	1	1
17	Syria (SYR)	0	0	1	1
Totals (21 entries)		48	48	49	145

== Participating nations ==
A total of 688 athletes from 43 nations competed in athletics at the 2018 Asian Games:

- Afghanistan (2)
- Bahrain (35)
- Bangladesh (2)
- Brunei (2)
- Cambodia (5)
- China (78)
- Chinese Taipei (28)
- Hong Kong (21)
- India (45)
- Indonesia (55)
- Iran (12)
- Iraq (12)
- Japan (58)
- Jordan (1)
- Kazakhstan (33)
- Kuwait (2)
- Kyrgyzstan (9)
- Laos (4)
- Lebanon (2)
- Macau (4)
- Malaysia (15)
- Maldives (4)
- Mongolia (9)
- Nepal (6)
- North Korea (8)
- Oman (4)
- Pakistan (12)
- Palestine (3)
- Philippines (13)
- Qatar (25)
- Saudi Arabia (14)
- Singapore (7)
- South Korea (39)
- Sri Lanka (11)
- Syria (1)
- Tajikistan (6)
- Thailand (51)
- Timor-Leste (6)
- Turkmenistan (1)
- United Arab Emirates (5)
- Uzbekistan (11)
- Vietnam (22)
- Yemen (5)
