= 2018 Asian Games medal table =

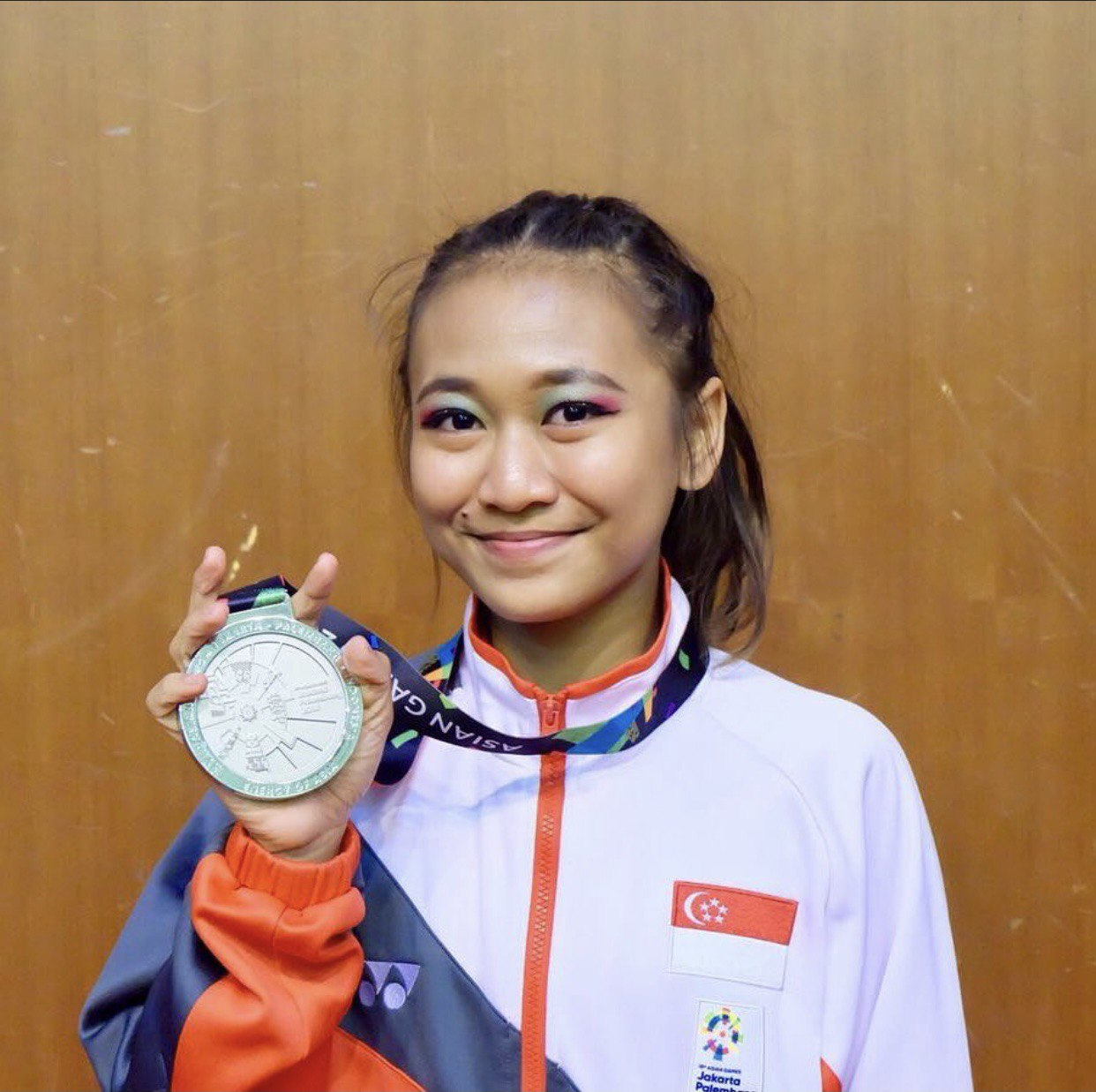
- Singaporean Pencak silat athlete Nurzuhairah Yazid holding up her silver medal at the 2018 Asian Games.
- Location: Palembang, Indonesia

Highlights
- Most gold medals: China 132
- Most total medals: China 289
- Medalling NOCs: 37

The 2018 Asian Games, officially known as the XVIII Asiad, is the largest sporting event in Asia governed by Olympic Council of Asia (OCA). It was held at Jakarta and Palembang, Indonesia between 18 August – 2 September 2018, with 465 events in 40 sports and disciplines featured in the Games. This resulted in 465 medal sets being distributed.

Two bronze medals were awarded in some sports: all events in badminton (7), boxing (10), bridge (6), fencing (12), judo (15), jujitsu (8), kabaddi (2), karate (12), kurash (7), sambo (4), sepak takraw (6), soft tennis (5), squash (4), table tennis (5), taekwondo (14), tennis (5) and wrestling (18), most events in pencak silat (10) and some events in wushu (6). Furthermore, there was a third-place tie in athletics men's high jump event, giving a total of 157 additional bronze medals.

As a result, a total of 1,552 medals comprising 465 gold medals, 465 silver medals, and 622 bronze medals were awarded to athletes.

== Medal table ==
* Host nation (Indonesia)

2018 Asian Games medal table
Rank	NOC	Gold	Silver	Bronze	Total
1	China	132	92	65	289
2	Japan	75	56	74	205
3	South Korea	49	58	70	177
4	Indonesia*	31	24	43	98
5	Uzbekistan	20	24	25	69
6	Iran	20	20	22	62
7	Chinese Taipei	17	19	31	67
8	India	16	23	31	70
9	Kazakhstan	15	17	44	76
10	North Korea	12	12	13	37
11	Bahrain	12	7	7	26
12	Thailand	11	16	46	73
13	Hong Kong	8	18	20	46
14	Malaysia	7	13	16	36
15	Qatar	6	4	3	13
16	Vietnam	5	15	19	39
17	Mongolia	5	9	11	25
18	Singapore	4	4	14	22
19	Philippines	4	2	15	21
20	United Arab Emirates	3	6	5	14
21	Kuwait	3	1	2	6
22	Kyrgyzstan	2	6	12	20
23	Jordan	2	1	9	12
24	Cambodia	2	0	1	3
25	Saudi Arabia	1	2	3	6
26	Macau	1	2	2	5
27	Iraq	1	2	0	3
28	Korea	1	1	2	4
28	Lebanon	1	1	2	4
30	Tajikistan	0	4	3	7
31	Laos	0	2	3	5
32	Turkmenistan	0	1	2	3
33	Nepal	0	1	0	1
34	Pakistan	0	0	4	4
35	Afghanistan	0	0	2	2
35	Myanmar	0	0	2	2
37	Syria	0	0	1	1
Totals (37 entries)		466	463	624	1,553

== NOCs without medal ==
- Bangladesh (BAN)
- Bhutan (BHU)
- Brunei (BRU)
- Timor-Leste (TLS)
- Maldives (MDV)
- Oman (OMA)
- Palestine (PLE)
- Sri Lanka (SRI)
- Yemen (YEM)

== Changes in medal standings ==
Key

Disqualified athlete(s)

Ruling date	Sport/Event	Athlete (NOC)	Gold	Silver	Bronze	Total
3 September 2018	Wrestling; Women's freestyle 62 kg	(Mongolia) Pürevdorjiin Orkhon (MGL)	–1			–1
3 September 2018	Wrestling; Women's freestyle 62 kg	(Kyrgyzstan) Aisuluu Tynybekova (KGZ)	+1	–1		0
3 September 2018	Wrestling; Women's freestyle 62 kg	(Japan) Risako Kawai (JPN)		+1	–1	0
3 September 2018	Wrestling; Women's freestyle 62 kg	(Vietnam) Nguyễn Thị Mỹ Hạnh (VIE)			+1	+1
11 March 2019	Kurash; Women's 78 kg	(Uzbekistan) Kumush Yuldashova (UZB)	–1			–1
19 July 2019	Athletics; Women's 400 metres hurdles	(Bahrain) Kemi Adekoya (BRN)	–1			–1
19 July 2019	Athletics; Women's 400 metres hurdles	(Vietnam) Quách Thị Lan (VIE)	+1	–1		0
19 July 2019	Athletics; Women's 400 metres hurdles	(Bahrain) Aminat Yusuf Jamal (BRN)		+1	–1	0
19 July 2019	Athletics; Women's 400 metres hurdles	(India) Anu Raghavan (IND)			+1	+1
19 July 2019	Athletics; Mixed 4 × 400 metres relay	Bahrain (BRN); Ali Khamis; Kemi Adekoya; Salwa Eid Naser; Abbas Abubakar Abbas	–1			–1
19 July 2019	Athletics; Mixed 4 × 400 metres relay	India (IND); Muhammed Anas; M. R. Poovamma; Hima Das; Arokia Rajiv	+1	–1		0
19 July 2019	Athletics; Mixed 4 × 400 metres relay	Kazakhstan (KAZ); Svetlana Golendova; Dmitriy Koblov; Elina Mikhina; Mikhail Litvin		+1	–1	0
19 July 2019	Athletics; Mixed 4 × 400 metres relay	China (CHN); Cheng Chong; Yang Lei; Huang Guifen; Wu Yuang			+1	+1

List of official changes by country
NOC	Gold	Silver	Bronze	Net Change
India	+1	−1	+1	+1
Vietnam	+1	−1	+1	+1
China	0	0	+1	+1
Kyrgyzstan	+1	−1	0	0
Japan	0	+1	−1	0
Kazakhstan	0	+1	−1	0
Mongolia	−1	0	0	−1
Uzbekistan	−1	0	0	−1
Bahrain	−2	+1	−1	−2

On 3 September 2018, it was announced that Pürevdorjiin Orkhon of team Mongolia had tested positive for stanozolol in a urine test conducted on 20 August 2018. Violating the anti-doping rules, Orkhon was stripped of her gold medal.

Due to the positive result of the test for stanozolol, the Athletics Integrity Unit declared to strip from Bahraini athlete Kemi Adekoya all results achieved after 24 August 2018, including her two gold medals in the 400 hurdles and the 4x400 mixed relay at the Asian Games. The medals were re-awarded to athletes of Vietnam and India, respectively.

Kumush Yuldashova of Uzbekistan originally won the gold medal in the 78 kg Kurash, but she was disqualified after testing positive for stanozolol.
