= Athletics at the 2018 Asian Games – Women's 4 × 100 metres relay =

Women's 4 × 100 metres relay at the 2018 Asian Games
- Venue: Gelora Bung Karno Stadium
- Date: 29–30 August 2018
- Competitors: 51 from 12 nations

Medalists
gold medal	Bahrain; Iman Essa Jasim, Edidiong Odiong, Hajar Al-Khaldi, Salwa Eid Naser
silver medal	China; Liang Xiaojing, Wei Yongli, Ge Manqi, Yuan Qiqi, Huang Guifen, Kong Lingwei
bronze medal	Kazakhstan; Viktoriya Zyabkina, Elina Mikhina, Svetlana Golendova, Olga Safronova, Rima Kashafutdinova

The women's 4 × 100 metres relay competition at the 2018 Asian Games took place on 29 and 30 August 2018 at the Gelora Bung Karno Stadium in Jakarta, Indonesia.

== Schedule ==
All times are Western Indonesia Time (UTC+07:00)

Date	Time	Event
Wednesday, 29 August 2018	20:55	Round 1
Thursday, 30 August 2018	18:45	Final

== Records ==
Prior to this competition, the existing world, Asian and Games records were as follows.

World Record	United States	40.82	London, United Kingdom	10 August 2012
Asian Record	China	42.23	Shanghai, China	23 October 1997
Games Record	China	42.83	Incheon, South Korea	2 October 2014

== Results ==
=== Round 1 ===
- Qualification: First 3 in each heat (Q) and the next 2 fastest (q) advance to the final.

==== Heat 1 ====
Rank	Team	Time	Notes
1	China (CHN); Liang Xiaojing; Huang Guifen; Kong Lingwei; Yuan Qiqi	43.66	Q
2	Bahrain (BRN); Iman Essa Jasim; Edidiong Odiong; Hajar Al-Khaldi; Salwa Eid Naser	43.68	Q
3	Chinese Taipei (TPE); Liao Ching-hsien; Liao Yan-jun; Hu Chia-chen; Chen Wan-mei	45.17	Q
4	Vietnam (VIE); Lưu Kim Phụng; Lê Thị Mộng Tuyền; Hà Thị Thu; Lê Tú Chinh	45.22	q
5	Singapore (SGP); Wendy Enn; Shanti Pereira; Smriti Mahesh Menon; Nur Izlyn Zaini	45.93	
6	South Korea (KOR); You Jin; Kim Min-ji; Lee Min-jung; Jung Hye-lim	46.04	

==== Heat 2 ====
Rank	Team	Time	Notes
1	Kazakhstan; Rima Kashafutdinova; Elina Mikhina; Olga Safronova; Svetlana Golendova	44.40	Q
2	Thailand; Sureewan Runan; Onuma Chattha; Supawan Thipat; Parichat Charoensuk	44.81	Q
3	Japan; Midori Mikase; Kana Ichikawa; Nodoka Seko; Masumi Aoki	44.95	Q
4	Hong Kong; Lam On Ki; Leung Kwan Yi; Poon Hang Wai; Chan Pui Kei	45.53	q
5	Indonesia; Tyas Murtiningsih; Yuliana; Lusiana Satriani; Fitria Indah Wahyuni	45.66	
6	Cambodia; Chan Seyha; Duong Sreypheap; Ben Seyha; Chan Lina	50.58	

=== Final ===
Rank	Team	Time	Notes
1st place, gold medalist(s)	Bahrain (BRN); Iman Essa Jasim; Edidiong Odiong; Hajar Al-Khaldi; Salwa Eid Naser	42.73	GR
2nd place, silver medalist(s)	China (CHN); Liang Xiaojing; Wei Yongli; Ge Manqi; Yuan Qiqi	42.84	
3rd place, bronze medalist(s)	Kazakhstan; Viktoriya Zyabkina; Elina Mikhina; Svetlana Golendova; Olga Safronova	43.82	
4	Thailand; Sureewan Runan; Onuma Chattha; Supawan Thipat; Parichat Charoensuk	44.56	
5	Japan; Midori Mikase; Kana Ichikawa; Nodoka Seko; Masumi Aoki	44.93	
6	Chinese Taipei (TPE); Liao Ching-hsien; Liao Yan-jun; Hu Chia-chen; Chen Wan-mei	45.19	
7	Vietnam (VIE); Lưu Kim Phụng; Lê Thị Mộng Tuyền; Hà Thị Thu; Lê Tú Chinh	45.42	
8	Hong Kong; Lam On Ki; Leung Kwan Yi; Poon Hang Wai; Chan Pui Kei	45.73	
