= Athletics at the 2018 Asian Games – Women's 400 metres =

Athletics event

Women's 400 metres at the 2018 Asian Games
- Venue: Gelora Bung Karno Stadium
- Date: 25–26 August 2018
- Competitors: 18 from 12 nations

Medalists
gold medal	Salwa Eid Naser	Bahrain
silver medal	Hima Das	India
bronze medal	Elina Mikhina	Kazakhstan

The women's 400 metres competition at the 2018 Asian Games took place on 25 and 26 August 2018 at the Gelora Bung Karno Stadium.

== Schedule ==
All times are Western Indonesia Time (UTC+07:00)

Date	Time	Event
Saturday, 25 August 2018	20:35	Round 1
Sunday, 26 August 2018	19:00	Final

== Records ==
Prior to this competition, the existing world, Asian and Games records were as follows.

World Record	Marita Koch (GDR)	47.60	Canberra, Australia	6 October 1985
Asian Record	Salwa Eid Naser (BRN)	49.08	Monaco	20 July 2018
Games Record	Kemi Adekoya (BRN)	51.11	Incheon, South Korea	27 September 2014

== Results ==
=== Round 1 ===
- Qualification: First 2 in each heat (Q) and the next 2 fastest (q) advance to the final.

==== Heat 1 ====
Rank	Athlete	Time	Notes
1	Salwa Eid Naser (BRN)	50.86	Q, GR
2	Hima Das (IND)	51.00	Q
3	Elina Mikhina (KAZ)	53.75	q
4	Dewi Ayu Agung Kurniayanti (INA)	56.09	
5	Supanich Poolkerd (THA)	56.62	
6	Aishath Himna Hassan (MDV)	1:00.59	

==== Heat 2 ====
Rank	Athlete	Time	Notes
1	Iman Essa Jasim (BRN)	54.10	Q
2	Huang Guifen (CHN)	54.30	Q
3	Nguyễn Thị Hằng (VIE)	54.99	q
4	Lyubov Ushakova (KAZ)	56.00	
5	Kristina Pronzhenko (TJK)	56.59	
6	Dana Al-Shehri (KSA)	1:06.33	

==== Heat 3 ====
Rank	Athlete	Time	Notes
1	Nirmala Sheoran (IND)	~~54.09~~	Q
2	Tong Zenghuan (CHN)	54.29	Q
3	Sri Maya Sari (INA)	56.47	
4	Sumi Aktar (BAN)	57.16	
5	Rawiwan Pratike (THA)	1:00.78	
6	Hanin Thabit (YEM)	1:05.79	

=== Final ===
Rank	Athlete	Time	Notes
1st place, gold medalist(s)	Salwa Eid Naser (BRN)	50.09	GR
2nd place, silver medalist(s)	Hima Das (IND)	50.79	
3rd place, bronze medalist(s)	Elina Mikhina (KAZ)	52.63	
4	Huang Guifen (CHN)	53.89	
5	Tong Zenghuan (CHN)	53.95	
6	Iman Essa Jasim (BRN)	54.19	
7	Nguyễn Thị Hằng (VIE)	54.30	
DQ	Nirmala Sheoran (IND)	~~52.96~~	

- Nirmala Sheoran of India originally finished 4th, but due to the positive result of the test for Drostanolone and Metenolone, the Athletics Integrity Unit declared to invalidate all results achieved from 15 August 2016 by her.
