= List of Kyrgyzstani records in athletics =

The following are the national records in athletics in Kyrgyzstan maintained by Athletics Federation of Kyrgyz Republic.

== Outdoor ==
Key to tables: Awaiting ratification Record not kept by Athletics Federation of Kyrgyz Republic Not ratified or later rescinded by Athletics Federation of Kyrgyz Republic

=== Men ===
Event	Record	Athlete	Date	Meet	Place	Ref.	Video
100 m	10.39	Valeriy Shchekotov	1991		Frunze, Soviet Union		
100 m	10.38 (+0.6 m/s)	Zhamal Musayev	4 July 2016		Almaty, Kazakhstan		
200 m	21.25	Valeriy Shchekotov	26 May 1991		Alma Ata, Soviet Union		
200 m	21.19	Aleksandr Zolotukhin	23 July 2004		Bishkek, Kyrgyzstan		
400 m	46.67	Nikolay Chernetskiy	7 July 1978		Berkeley, United States		
800 m	1:46.04	Boris Kaveshnikov	15 July 1999		Moscow, Russia		
1500 m	3:41.12	Nursultan Keneshbekov	3 June 2022	Irena Szewińska Memorial	Bydgoszcz, Poland		
3000 m	8:05.98	Denis Bagrev	9 July 2004		Kazan, Russia		
5000 m	13:34.2 h	Vadim Mochalov	13 May 1976		Sochi, Soviet Union		
10,000 m	28:00.9 h	Vadim Mochalov	10 July 1973		Sochi, Soviet Union		
10 km (road)	29:48	Yuriy Chechun	29 April 2012	Asics Road Race	Zhukovsky, Russia		
15 km (road)	45:38	Arkadii Nikitin	18 February 1995	Gasparilla Distance Classic	Tampa, United States		
Half marathon	1:05:02	Adilet Kyshtakbekov	24 March 2019	Tashkent International Half Marathon	Tashkent, Uzbekistan		
Half marathon	1:03:24	Arkadii Nikitin	24 September 1994	World Half Marathon Championships	Oslo, Norway		
Half marathon	1:04:55	Vladimir Kiselyov	24 September 1994	World Half Marathon Championships	Oslo, Norway		
Marathon	2:11:16	Satymkul Dzhumanazarov	24 May 1980		Moscow, Soviet Union		
110 m hurdles	14.08 (−0.2 m/s)	Yeniya Shorokhov	19 May 1996		Almaty, Kazakhstan		
110 m hurdles	13.86 (±0.0 m/s)	Andrey Korniyenko	10 June 1999	Kyrgyzstani Championships	Bishkek, Kyrgyzstan		
400 m hurdles	51.34	Aleksey Pogorelov	26 July 2007	Asian Championships	Amman, Jordan		
400 m hurdles	49.42 (Note: unknown irregularity)	Aleksey Pogorelov	31 May 2008		Bishkek, Kyrgyzstan		
400 m hurdles	49.81 (Note: unknown irregularity)	Aleksey Pogorelov	21 June 2008		Bishkek, Kyrgyzstan		
400 m hurdles	50.75 (Note: unknown irregularity)	Aleksey Pogorelov	22/23 May 2008		Tashkent, Uzbekistan		
400 m hurdles	51.30	Aleksey Pogorelov	23 July 2004	Kyrgyzstani Championships	Bishkek, Kyrgyzstan		
400 m hurdles	51.32	Aleksey Pogorelov	4 July 2008		Almaty, Kazakhstan		
3000 m steeplechase	8:38.4 h	Aiyin Isakov	4 July 1980		Moscow, Soviet Union		
High jump	2.41 m	Igor Paklin	4 September 1985	Universiade	Kobe, Japan		
Pole vault	5.23 m	Nikita Kirillov	19 March 2011	Georgia Intercollegiate Invitational	Atlanta, United States		
Long jump	8.16 m	Shamil Abbyasov	2 August 1981		Leningrad, Soviet Union		
Triple jump	17.27 m	Shamil Abbyasov	15 May 1983		Tashkent, Soviet Union		
Shot put	17.44 m	Konstantin Gavrilov	20 June 1984		Frunze, Soviet Union		
Discus throw	59.60 m	Nikolay Syskin	12 May 1982		Frunze, Soviet Union		
Hammer throw	72.94 m	Nikolay Davydov	10 July 1999		Bishkek, Kyrgyzstan		
Javelin throw	77.77 m	Dmitriy Shnayder	2 July 2000		Bishkek, Kyrgyzstan		
Decathlon	7566 pts h	Gennadiy Balakshi	29–30 April 1978		Frunze, Soviet Union		
Decathlon	100m / Long jump / Shot put / High jump / 400m / 110m H / Discus / Pole vault / Javelin / 1500m; 10.7 / 7.27 m / 14.10 m / 1.93 m / 51.9 / 15.1 / 43.66 m / 4.70 m / 56.22 m / 4:58.4						
20 km walk (road)	1:24:13	Otto Barch	11 June 1976		Kiev, Soviet Union		
50 km walk (road)	3:52:05	Otto Barch	27 July 1979		Moscow, Soviet Union		
4 × 100 m relay	40.43	Kyrgyz SSR; V. Bodrov; Vladimir Poborchev; O. Zuyev; S. Shchekotov	25 May 1991		Alma Ata, Soviet Union		
4 × 400 m relay	3:13.7 h	Kyrgyz SSR; S. Antoshkin; S. Tikhonov; A. Pedan; V. Nikulets	28 July 1979		Moscow, Soviet Union		

=== Women ===
Event	Record	Athlete	Date	Meet	Place	Ref.
100 m	11.37 (+0.7 m/s)	Yelena Bobrovskaya	20 May 2004		Tashkent, Uzbekistan	
100 m	11.35	Yelena Bobrovskaya	22 July 2004		Bishkek, Kyrgyzstan	
200 m	23.08	Maria Kulchunova	11 September 1976		Erfurt, East Germany	
400 m	51.80	Maria Kulchunova	24 June 1976		Kiev, Soviet Union	
800 m	1:58.85	Lyudmila Derevyankina	30 July 1988		Kiev, Soviet Union	
1500 m	4:05.89	Lyudmila Derevyankina	2 August 1988		Kiev, Soviet Union	
3000 m	9:05.18	Irina Bogachova	17 July 1987		Bryansk, Soviet Union	
5000 m	15:00.42	Darya Maslova	18 May 2017	Islamic Solidarity Games	Baku, Azerbaijan	
5 km (road)	16:23	Irina Bogacheva	8 February 1992	Great Gainesville Road Race	Gainesville, United States	
10,000 m	31:36.90	Darya Maslova	12 August 2016	Olympic Games	Rio de Janeiro, Brazil	
10 km (road)	33:22	Darya Maslova	27 May 2018	World 10K Bangalore	Bangalore, India	
15 km (road)	51:13	Irina Bogachova	27 February 1993		Tampa, United States	
10 miles (road)	54:59	Irina Bogacheva	22 August 1992	Crim Festival of Races	Flint, United States	
Half marathon	1:11:06	Darya Maslova	23 April 2017	Yangzhou Jianzhen International Half Marathon	Yangzhou, China	
Marathon	2:26:27 a	Irina Bogachova	17 April 2000	Boston Marathon	Boston, United States	
100 m hurdles	14.10	Lyudmila Vlasova	1 August 1982		Moscow, Soviet Union	
400 m hurdles	56.16	Galina Pedan	15 July 2004		Almaty, Kazakhstan	
3000 m steeplechase						
High jump	1.97 m	Tatyana Efimenko	11 July 2003		Rome, Italy	
Pole vault						
Long jump	7.06 m	Tatyana Kolpakova	31 July 1980		Moscow, Soviet Union	
Triple jump	13.76 m (+1.5 m/s)	Rahima Sardi	19 June 2007	Asian Grand Prix	Bangkok, Thailand	
Shot put	15.38 m	Svetlana Pechenyuk	11 May 1974		Frunze, Soviet Union	
Discus throw	62.22	Lyubov Yelizarova	13 February 1983		Yalta, Soviet Union	
Hammer throw	64.44 m	Alla Fyodorova	24 February 1991		Adler, Soviet Union	
Javelin throw	57.28 m	Tatyana Sudarikova	2 July 2000		Bishkek, Kyrgyzstan	
Heptathlon	5809 pts	Natalya Knyazeva	10-11 June 1989		Bryansk, Soviet Union	
Heptathlon	100m H / High jump / Shot put / 200m / Long jump / Javelin / 800m; 14.27 / 1.80 m / 13.48 m / 26.11 / 5.90 m / 43.00 m / 2:21.84					
20 km walk (road)						
4 × 100 m relay	46.5	Kyrgyz SSR; V. Andrusenko; S. Dashko; O. Balandina; O. Kuzmizkh	10 May 1987		Dushanbe, Soviet Union	
4 × 400 m relay	3:38.7	Kyrgyz SSR	15 May 1989		Tashkent, Soviet Union	

=== Mixed ===
Event	Record	Athlete	Date	Meet	Place	Ref.
4 × 400 m relay	3:40.22	Kyrgyzstan; R. Son; N. Keneshbekov; A. Jamshytbekova; S. Sadykzhan uulu	2 July 2023	Qosanov Memorial	Almaty, Kazakhstan	
4 × 400 m relay	3:40.22	Kyrgyzstan; R. Litoskiy; A. Zhamshitbekova; A. Kalil kyzy N. Keneshbekov	12 May 2024	Central Asian Championships	Tashkent, Uzbekistan	

== Indoor ==
=== Men ===
Event	Record	Athlete	Date	Meet	Place	Ref.
60 m	6.4 h	Valeriy Shchekotov	1990			
60 m	6.4 h	Aleksandr Zolotukhin	24 February 2010		Bishkek, Kyrgyzstan	
200 m	22.34	Aleksandr Zolotukhin	5 February 2005		Karaganda, Kazakhstan	
200 m	21.7 h	Aleksandr Zolotukhin	25 February 2009		Bishkek, Kyrgyzstan	
400 m	46.29	Nikolay Chernetskiy	2 March 1980	European Championships	Sindelfingen, West Germany	
800 m	1:47.56	Boris Kaveshnikov	29 January 2000	BW-Bank Meeting	Karlsruhe, Germany	
1500 m	3:44.75	Nursultan Keneshbekov	8 February 2026	Asian Championships	Tianjin, China	
3000 m	7:55.06	Nursultan Keneshbekov	7 February 2026	Asian Championships	Tianjin, China	
5000 m	13:58.07	Yuriy Chechun	24 February 2012	Russian Championships	Moscow, Russia	
60 m hurdles	8.10	Yevgeniy Shorokhov	11 March 1995	World Championships	Barcelona, Spain	
High jump	2.38 m	Igor Paklin	7 March 1987	World Championships	Indianapolis, United States	
Pole vault						
Long jump	8.09 m	Shamil Abbyasov	8 February 1985		Moscow, Soviet Union	
Triple jump	17.30 m	Shamil Abbyasov	21 February 1981	European Championships	Grenoble, France	
Shot put	12.55 m	Aleksey Galkin	7 February 2004		Bishkek, Kyrgyzstan	
Heptathlon						
Heptathlon	60m / Long jump / Shot put / High jump / 60m H / Pole vault / 1000m					
5000 m walk						
4 × 400 m relay						

=== Women ===
Event	Record	Athlete	Date	Meet	Place	Ref.
60 m	7.28	Yelena Bobrovskaya	27 February 2003		Bishkek, Kyrgyzstan	
200 m	25.22	Oksana Luneva	24 January 2006		Moscow, Russia	
300 m	39.08	Oksana Luneva	7 January 2007	Luch Christmas Prizes	Yekaterinburg, Russia	
400 m	51.27	Mariya Kulchunova-Pinigina	22 February 1987		Liévin, France	
500 m	1:10.35	Oksana Luneva	7 January 2006		Yekaterinburg, Russia	
600 m	1:31.16	Oksana Luneva	24 December 2005	Bulatov Memorial	Omsk, Russia	
800 m	2:09.97	Arina Kleshchukova	20 September 2017	Asian Indoor and Martial Arts Games	Ashgabat, Turkmenistan	
800 m	2:07.6	Tatyana Borisova	12 October 2001		Rasht, Iran	
800 m	2:09.28	Arina Kleshchukova	21 February 2016	Asian Championships	Doha, Qatar	
1500 m	4:25.36	Viktoriia Poliudina	15 February 2014	Asian Championships	Hangzhou, China	
3000 m	9:39.28	Viktoriia Poliudina	16 February 2014	Asian Championships	Hangzhou, China	
3000 m	9:25.7 h	Darya Maslova	4 January 2018		Bishkek, Kyrgyzstan	
3000 m	9:30.76	Viktoriia Poliudina	12 March 2010	World Championships	Doha, Qatar	
3000 m	9:34.77	Gulshanoi Satarova	16 February 2014	Asian Championships	Hangzhou, China	
3000 m	9:35.4 h	Iuliia Arkhipova	24 February 2010	Kyrgyzstani Championships	Bishkek, Kyrgyzstan	
5000 m	16:48.21	Arina Kleshchukova	28 February 2021	Southland Conference Championships	Birmingham, United States	
60 m hurdles	8.78	Aiganysh Asanaliyeva	7 February 2007		Moscow, Russia	
High jump	1.95 m	Tatyana Efimenko	2 February 2006		Stockholm, Sweden	
Pole vault						
Long jump	5.85 m	Rakhima Sardi	16 February 2007		Bishkek, Kyrgyzstan	
Triple jump	12.61 m	Rakhima Sardi	25 February 2005		Bishkek, Kyrgyzstan	
Shot put	12.51 m	Yekaterina Starikova	18 January 2004		Bishkek, Kyrgyzstan	
Pentathlon						
Pentathlon	60m H / High jump / Shot put / Long jump / 800m					
3000 m walk						
4 × 400 m relay	3:56.11	Kyrgyzstan; Olesia Korovina; Anna Bulanova; Ksenia Kadkina; Iuliia Khodykina	19 February 2012	Asian Championships	Hangzhou, China	
