= Odiong =

Odiong may refer to:

- Edidiong Odiong, an athlete from Bahrain
- Odiong, a barangay in Jagna, Bohol
