= 2018 West Asian Athletics Championships =

3rd West Asian Athletics Championships
- Dates: July 8–11
- Host city: Amman, Jordan
- Events: 44

The 2018 West Asian Athletics Championships was the third edition of the international athletics competition organised by the West Asian Athletics Association that took place from 8 to 11 July 2018 in Amman, Jordan.

== Medal summary ==
=== Men ===
Event	Gold		Silver		Bronze	
100 metres (wind: +1.7 m/s)	Barakat Al-Harthi (OMA)	9.97 NR	Andrew Fisher (BHR)	10.24	Saeed Al-Khaldi (BHR)	10.49
200 metres (wind: +3.6 m/s)	Salem Eid Yaqoob (BHR)	20.53	Neseib Salman Al-Zaabi (UAE)	20.78	Mohamed Obaid Al-Saadi (OMA)	21.09
400 metres	Abbas Abubakar Abbas (BHR)	46.51	Abdulrahman Khamis Abbas (BHR)	47.34	Othman Al-Busaidi (OMA)	47.87
800 metres	Abraham Rotich (BHR)	1:49.81	Ebrahim Al-Zofairi (KUW)	1:50.75	Mayouf Hassan Ahmed (UAE)	1:51.93
1500 metres	Mohammed Tiouali (BHR)	3:48.90	Awwad Al-Sharafat (JOR)	3:55.73	Only two finishers (Note: The original winner Sadik Mikhou was disqualified for doping)	
5000 metres	Albert Rop (BHR)	13:42.94	Dawit Fikadu (BHR)	14:34.60	Sharif Elatawneh (JOR)	15:09.72
10,000 metres	Benson Seurei (BHR)	30:34.79	Dawit Fikadu (BHR)	30:49.00	Mubarak Al-Marashda (UAE)	31:56.64
110 metres hurdles (wind: +2.2 m/s)	Yaqoub Mohamed Al-Youha (KUW)	14.13	Bakr Al-Habahbeh (JOR)	15.56	Muath Al-Turki (JOR)	?
400 metres hurdles	Hamed Abdullah Saleh (KUW)	52.58	Only one competitor			
3000 metres steeplechase	John Kibet Koech (BHR)	8:46.60	Evans Rutto Chematot (BHR)	8:48.97	Hassan Al-Dajah (JOR)	9:15.48
4 × 100 metres relay	Oman	?	United Arab Emirates	?	Jordan	?
4 × 400 metres relay	Iraq; Yasir Ali Al Saadi; Ahmed Fadel; Ghassam Mohamed; Taha Hussein Yaseen	3:09.96	Bahrain ? ? ? Abbas Abubakar Abbas	3:10.22	Oman ? ? ? Othman Al-Busaidi	3:10.25
20 kilometres walk	Aboud Khaled Joudah (JOR)	1:50:30	Only one competitor			
High jump	Mohamed Al-Buheiri (JOR)	2.10 m	Fathi Abdul Ghafoor (OMA)	2.07 m NR	Khaled Abdullatif (KUW)	2.07 m
Pole vault	Abdullah Al-Turqi (KUW)	4.50 m	Ashraf Al-Malkawi (JOR)	4.00 m	Only two competitors	
Long jump	Salem Saleh Al-Jerbi (OMA)	7.29 m	Abdullah Al-Mourshed (KUW)	7.14 m	Mohamed Salem Al-Rawahi (OMA)	7.11 m
Triple jump	Khaled Saeed Al-Subaie (KUW)	16.23 m	Mohamed Abbas Darwish (UAE)	16.17 m	Mohamed Salem Al-Rawahi (OMA)	15.41 m NR
Shot put	Meshari Saad Suroor (KUW)	18.40 m	Musaeb Al-Momani (JOR)	17.40 m	Ibrahim Al-Fadhli (KUW)	16.15 m
Discus throw	Musaeb Al-Momani (JOR)	54.07 m	Only one competitor			
Hammer throw	Mohammed Abdulkerim Al-Jawhar (KUW)	61.81 m	Mohamed Omar Al-Khatib (UAE)	60.77 m	Odai Amer Hawaftnah (JOR)	55.75 m
Javelin throw	Abdullah Melhes (JOR)	51.25 m	Only one competitor			
Decathlon	Majed Radhi Al-Sayed (KUW)	6741 pts	Only one competitor			

=== Women ===
Event	Gold		Silver		Bronze	
100 metres (wind: +1.6 m/s)	Hajar Saad Al-Khaldi (BHR)	11.17 CR	Edidiong Odiong (BHR)	11.32	Aziza Sbaity (LBN)	11.75 NR
200 metres (wind: +3.0 m/s)	Hajar Saad Al-Khaldi (BHR)	23.09	Aziza Sbaity (LBN)	24.20	Iman Essa Jasim (BHR)	24.22
400 metres	Salwa Eid Naser (BHR)	53.03 CR	Iman Essa Jasim (BHR)	55.79	Aliya Boshnak (JOR)	57.92
800 metres	Marta Hirpato (BHR)	2:07.05	Tigist Gashaw Belay (BHR)	2:12.10	Only two competitors	
1500 metres	Tigist Gashaw Belay (BHR)	4:13.16 CR	Kalkidan Gezahegne (BHR)	4:15.24	Tamara Armoush (JOR)	4:32.58
5000 metres	Bontu Rebitu (BHR)	16:34.40	Kalkidan Gezahegne (BHR)	16:35.46	Alia Saeed Mohamed (UAE)	16:43.31
10,000 metres	Shitaye Eshete (BHR)	33:37.25 CR	Alia Saeed Mohamed (UAE)	33:54.95	Desi Mokonin (BHR)	33:58.99
Half marathon	Nahidah Al-Bouat (JOR)	1:41:11	Only one competitor			
100 metres hurdles (wind: +0.4 m/s)	Aminat Yusuf Jamal (BHR)	14.15 CR	Christel Saneh (LIB)	15.40	Only two competitors	
400 metres hurdles	Aminat Yusuf Jamal (BHR)	56.75 CR	Diala El Khazen (LIB)	65.91	Only two competitors	
4 × 100 metres relay	Bahrain ? ? Salwa Eid Naser; Hajar Saad Al-Khaldi	44.58 NR	Lebanon; Ola Baajour ? Christel Saneh; Aziza Sbaity	48.60	Jordan	49.01
4 × 400 metres relay	Bahrain ? Iman Essa Jasim; Aminat Yusuf Jamal; Salwa Eid Naser	3:48.89	Jordan ? ? ? Aliya Boshnak	4:14.80	Kuwait	4:35.80
10 kilometres walk	Sandy Karam (LIB)	1:03:19	Only one competitor			
High jump	Nourhan El Kouch (LIB)	1.65 m	Only one competitor			
Pole vault	Rita Abdullah (JOR)	2.50 m	Only one competitor			
Long jump	Christel Saneh (LIB)	5.73 m NR	Taima Jafar (JOR)	?	Only two competitors	
Triple jump	Sara Al-Nsour (JOR)	10.44 m	Only one competitor			
Shot put	Noora Salem Jassem (BHR)	16.69 m	Fatima Al-Hosani (UAE)	12.64 m NR	Nadia Mohamed Al-Hakan (KUW)	9.80 m NR
Discus throw	Noora Salem Jassem (BHR)	47.45 m CR	Fatima Al-Hosani (UAE)	41.57 m	Haneen Bani Bakkar (JOR)	37.32 m
Hammer throw	Rania Al-Naji (QAT)	47.81 m	Wadad Ibrahim Ronani (UAE)	40.80 m	Only two competitors	
Javelin throw	Salsabeel Al-Sayyar (KUW)	32.08 m	Shamma Arsheed (JOR)	?	Nahed Al-Rawashdeh (JOR)	?
Heptathlon	Zaina Abdeen (JOR)	3727 pts	Nadia Mohamed Al-Hakan (KUW)	? pts	Jari Farhan (KUW)	? pts

== Medal table ==
Rank	Nation	Gold	Silver	Bronze	Total
1	Bahrain (BHR)	20	11	3	34
2	Jordan (JOR)	8	7	10	25
3	Kuwait (KUW)	8	3	5	16
4	Lebanon (LIB)	3	4	1	8
5	Oman (OMA)	3	1	5	9
6	Iraq (IRQ)	1	0	0	1
6	Qatar (QAT)	1	0	0	1
8	United Arab Emirates (UAE)	0	8	3	11
Totals (8 entries)		44	34	27	105
