= 2019 Asian Athletics Championships – Women's 4 × 100 metres relay =

Women's 4 × 100 metres relay at the 2019 Asian Athletics Championships
- Venue: Khalifa International Stadium
- Location: Doha, Qatar
- Dates: 23 April
- Nations: 7
- Winning time: 42.87 CR

Medalists
gold medal	Liang Xiaojing; Wei Yongli; Kong Lingwei; Ge Manqi	China
silver medal	Rima Kashafutdinova; Elina Mikhina; Svetlana Golendova; Olga Safronova	Kazakhstan
bronze medal	Edidiong Odiong; Iman Essa Jassim; Hajar Al-Khaldi; Salwa Eid Naser	Bahrain

The women's 4 × 100 metres relay event at the 2019 Asian Athletics Championships was held on 23 April.

== Results ==
Rank	Lane	Team	Name	Time	Notes
1st place, gold medalist(s)	5	China	Liang Xiaojing, Wei Yongli, Kong Lingwei, Ge Manqi	42.87	WL, CR
2nd place, silver medalist(s)	6	Kazakhstan	Rima Kashafutdinova, Elina Mikhina, Svetlana Golendova, Olga Safronova	43.36	SB
3rd place, bronze medalist(s)	8	Bahrain	Edidiong Odiong, Iman Essa Jassim, Hajar Al-Khaldi, Salwa Eid Naser	43.61	
4	2	India	Archana Suseentran, Veeramani Revathi, Kunnath Ranga, Dutee Chand	43.81	SB
5	4	Thailand	On-Uma Chattha, Khanrutai Pakdee, Tassaporn Wannakit, Supawan Thipat	43.99	SB
6	7	Japan	Ichiko Iki, Miku Yamada, Shuri Aono, Naoka Miyake	44.95	SB
7	3	Singapore	Clara Goh Si Hui, Veronica Shanti Pereira, Kugapriya Chandran, Elizabeth-Ann Shee	45.78	SB
