= Darya Maslova =

Kyrgyzstani long-distance runner

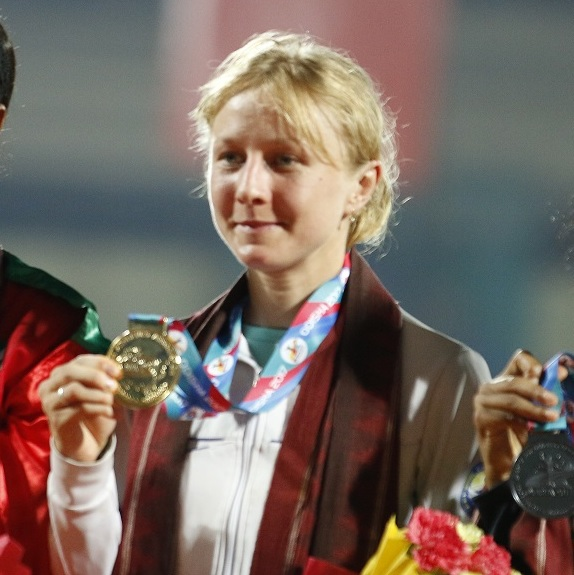
- Daria Maslova, Gold Medalist in 2017

Personal information
- Born: 6 May 1995 (age 31) Pristan'-Przheval'sk, Kyrgyzstan
- Education: Kyrgyz National Academy of Physical Education and Sports
- Height: 1.65 m (5 ft 5 in)
- Weight: 44 kg (97 lb)

Sport
- Sport: Track and field
- Event: 5000 metres

Darya Maslova (born 6 May 1995) is a Kyrgyzstani long-distance runner. She won bronze medals at the 2015 Asian Championships and the 2015 Summer Universiade. She has qualified to represent Kyrgyzstan at the 2020 Summer Olympics in the women's marathon event.

== Competition record ==
Year	Competition	Venue	Position	Event	Notes
Representing Kyrgyzstan
2014	Asian Junior Championships	Taipei, Taiwan	1st	3000 m	9:16.23
2014	Asian Junior Championships	Taipei, Taiwan	1st	5000 m	16:18.35
2014	World Junior Championships	Eugene, United States	14th	3000 m	9:30.28
2014	World Junior Championships	Eugene, United States	10th	5000 m	16:07.58
2014	Asian Games	Incheon, South Korea	9th	5000 m	15:47.17
2015	Asian Championships	Wuhan, China	3rd	5000 m	15:42.82
2015	Universiade	Gwangju, South Korea	3rd	5000 m	16:04.09
2016	Olympic Games	Rio de Janeiro, Brazil	19th	10,000 m	31:36.90 (NR)
2017	Islamic Solidarity Games	Baku, Azerbaijan	3rd	5000 m	15:00.42 (NR)
2017	Asian Championships	Bhubaneswar, India	1st	5000 m	15:57.95
2017	Asian Championships	Bhubaneswar, India	1st	10,000 m	32:21.21
2017	World Championships	London, United Kingdom	17th	10,000 m	31:57.23
2017	Universiade	Taipei, Taiwan	1st	10,000 m	33:19.27
2018	Asian Games	Jakarta, Indonesia	2nd	5,000 m	15:30.57
2018	Asian Games	Jakarta, Indonesia	1st	10,000 m	32:07.23
2021	Olympic Games	Sapporo, Japan	36th	Marathon	2:35:35

== Personal bests ==
Outdoor

- 800 metres –2:10.7 (Bishkek 2017)
- 1500 metres – 4:24.61 (Bishkek 2015)
- 3000 metres – 9:16.23 (Taipei City 2014)
- 5000 metres – 15:00.42 (Baku 2017) NR
- 10,000 metres – 31:36.90 (Rio de Janeiro 2016) NR
