= Athletics at the 2018 Asian Games – Women's 400 metres hurdles =

Women's 400 metres hurdles at the 2018 Asian Games
- Venue: Gelora Bung Karno Stadium
- Date: 26–27 August 2018
- Competitors: 13 from 9 nations

Medalists
gold medal	Quách Thị Lan	Vietnam
silver medal	Aminat Yusuf Jamal	Bahrain
bronze medal	Anu Raghavan	India

The women's 400 metres hurdles competition at the 2018 Asian Games took place on 26 and 27 August 2018 at the Gelora Bung Karno Stadium.

== Schedule ==
All times are Western Indonesia Time (UTC+07:00)

Date	Time	Event
Sunday, 26 August 2018	10:30	Round 1
Monday, 27 August 2018	18:45	Final

== Records ==
Prior to this competition, the existing world, Asian and Games records were as follows.

World Record	Yuliya Pechonkina (RUS)	52.34	Tula, Russia	8 August 2003
Asian Record	Han Qing (CHN); Song Yinglan (CHN)	53.96	Beijing, China; Guangzhou, China	9 September 1993; 22 November 2001
Games Record	Kemi Adekoya (BRN)	55.09	Incheon, South Korea	30 September 2014

== Results ==
=== Round 1 ===
- Qualification: First 3 in each heat (Q) and the next 2 fastest (q) advance to the final.

==== Heat 1 ====
Rank	Athlete	Time	Notes
1	Aminat Yusuf Jamal (BRN)	57.01	Q
2	Eri Utsunomiya (JPN)	57.99	Q
3	Dipna Lim Prasad (SGP)	58.93	Q
4	Jauna Murmu (IND)	59.20	q
5	Adelina Akhmetova (KAZ)	1:00.08	
6	Mo Jiadie (CHN)	1:00.62	
7	Kristina Pronzhenko (TJK)	1:01.21	

==== Heat 2 ====
Rank	Athlete	Time	Notes
1	Kemi Adekoya (BRN)	~~54.87~~	Q, ~~GR~~
2	Quách Thị Lan (VIE)	55.74	Q
3	Anu Raghavan (IND)	56.77	Q
4	Huang Yan (CHN)	58.31	q
5	Merjen Ishanguliyeva (KAZ)	59.32	
6	Mariam Mamdouh Farid (QAT)	1:13.27	

=== Final ===
Rank	Athlete	Time	Notes
1st place, gold medalist(s)	Quách Thị Lan (VIE)	55.30	
2nd place, silver medalist(s)	Aminat Yusuf Jamal (BRN)	55.65	
3rd place, bronze medalist(s)	Anu Raghavan (IND)	56.92	
4	Huang Yan (CHN)	57.48	
4	Jauna Murmu (IND)	57.48	
6	Eri Utsunomiya (JPN)	58.97	
7	Dipna Lim Prasad (SGP)	59.68	
DQ	Kemi Adekoya (BRN)	~~54.48~~	~~GR~~

- Kemi Adekoya originally won the gold medal, but she was disqualified after she tested positive for stanozolol. The Athletics Integrity Unit also ordered that her results from 24 August 2018 be deleted from the records.
