= Athletics at the 2018 Asian Games – Women's 10,000 metres =

Women's 10,000 metres at the 2018 Asian Games
- Venue: Gelora Bung Karno Stadium
- Date: 25 August 2018
- Competitors: 11 from 9 nations

Medalists
gold medal	Darya Maslova	Kyrgyzstan
silver medal	Eunice Chumba	Bahrain
bronze medal	Zhang Deshun	China

The women's 10,000 metres competition at the 2018 Asian Games took place on 25 August 2018 at the Gelora Bung Karno Stadium.

== Schedule ==
All times are Western Indonesia Time (UTC+07:00)

Date	Time	Event
Saturday, 25 August 2018	20:00	Final

== Records ==
Prior to this competition, the existing world, Asian and Games records were as follows.

World Record	Almaz Ayana (ETH)	29:17.45	Rio de Janeiro, Brazil	12 August 2016
Asian Record	Wang Junxia (CHN)	29:31.78	Beijing, China	8 September 1993
Games Record	Sun Yingjie (CHN)	30:28.26	Busan, South Korea	8 October 2002

== Results ==
Rank	Athlete	Time	Notes
1st place, gold medalist(s)	Darya Maslova (KGZ)	32:07.23	
2nd place, silver medalist(s)	Eunice Chumba (BRN)	32:11.12	
3rd place, bronze medalist(s)	Zhang Deshun (CHN)	32:12.78	
4	Alia Saeed Mohammed (UAE)	32:18.32	
5	Shitaye Eshete (BRN)	32:30.24	
6	Suriya Loganathan (IND)	32:42.08	
7	Yuka Hori (JPN)	32:42.73	
8	Sitora Hamidova (UZB)	33:08.93	
—	Ranwa Balilli (PLE)	DNF	
—	Hiruni Wijayaratne (SRI)	DNF	
DQ	Sanjivani Jadhav (IND)	~~33:13.06~~	

- Sanjivani Jadhav of India originally finished ninth, but due to the positive result of the test for probenecid, the Athletics Integrity Unit declared to invalidate all results achieved from 29 June 2018 by her.
