= 2015 Asian Athletics Championships – Women's 10,000 metres =

The women's 10,000 metres at the 2015 Asian Athletics Championships was held on June 7.

== Results ==
Rank	Name	Nationality	Time	Notes
1st place, gold medalist(s)	Alia Saeed Mohammed	United Arab Emirates	31:52.29	CR
2nd place, silver medalist(s)	Eunice Chumba	Bahrain	32:22.29	
3rd place, bronze medalist(s)	Michi Numata	Japan	32:44.57	
4	Wu Xufeng	China	33:03.86	
5	Zhang Meixia	China	34:53.97	
6	Marina Khmelevskaya	Uzbekistan	35:25.25	
	Lalita Babar	India	DNF	
	Sitora Khamidova	Uzbekistan	DNS	
