= Eunice Chumba =

Bahraini female long-distance runner

Personal information
- Full name: Eunice Chebichii Chumba
- Nationality: Bahraini
- Born: 23 May 1993 (age 33) Uasin Gishu, Kenya
- Height: 1.53 m (5 ft 0 in)
- Weight: 46 kg (101 lb)

Sport
- Country: Bahrain
- Sport: Athletics
- Events: Marathon, Cross country running, 10,000 metres
Medal record
Women's athletics
Representing Bahrain
World Half Marathon Championships
Bronze medal – third place	2018 Valencia	Team
Asian Games
Silver medal – second place	2018 Jakarta	10,000 m
Asian Championships
Silver medal – second place	2015 Wuhan	10,000 m
Arab Championships
Bronze medal – third place	2015 Isa Town	10,000 m
Military World Games
Gold medal – first place	2019 Wuhan	Marathon
World Cross Country Championships
Bronze medal – third place	2017 Kampala	Senior team
Asian Cross Country Championships
Gold medal – first place	2016 Manama	Senior race

Eunice Chebichii Chumba (born 23 May 1993) is a Kenyan-born Bahraini female long-distance runner. She won silver medals in the 10,000 metres at the 2018 Asian Games and 2015 Asian Athletics Championships.

== Biography ==
Eunice Chumba was born and raised in Kenya. She moved to Bahrain in 2014. She was motivated by her father to represent the country in athletics at international arena.

She claimed her first athletics senior gold medal in Manama at the 2016 Asian Cross Country Championships. Chumba won the 2017 Copenhagen Half Marathon with a time of 1:06:11, establishing a new course record among women. She also set a new Beirut Marathon record among women in 2017 with a finish of 2:28:43 to take the gold medal.

Chumba claimed her first Asian Games medal, silver in the women's 10,000 m event representing Bahrain at the 2018 Asian Games.

== Marathon competition record ==
- 2014 Marrakech Half Marathon: Gold
- 2015 Karlovy Vary Half Marathon: Bronze
- 2015 Cape Town Marathon: Silver
- 2016 Dongying Yellow River Marathon: Gold
- 2016 Copenhagen Half Marathon: Silver
- 2016 Amsterdam Marathon: Bronze
- 2017 Rotterdam Marathon: Silver
- 2017 Copenhagen Half Marathon: Gold
- 2017 Lisbon Half Marathon: Gold
- 2017 Beirut Marathon: Gold
- 2018 Beijing Marathon: Silver
- 2018 Abu Dhabi Marathon: Silver
- 2019 Hong Kong Marathon: Silver
- 2019 Liupanshui Summer International Marathon: Gold
- 2019 Military World Games Marathon: Gold
- 2021 Milano City Marathon: Bronze
- 2021 Abu Dhabi Marathon: Silver
- 2022 Seoul International Marathon: Bronze
- 2022 World Military Marathon Championships (Lima): Gold
- 2022 Abu Dhabi Marathon: Gold
- 2023 Rotterdam Marathon: Gold
