= Kieran Tuntivate =

Thai-American distance runner

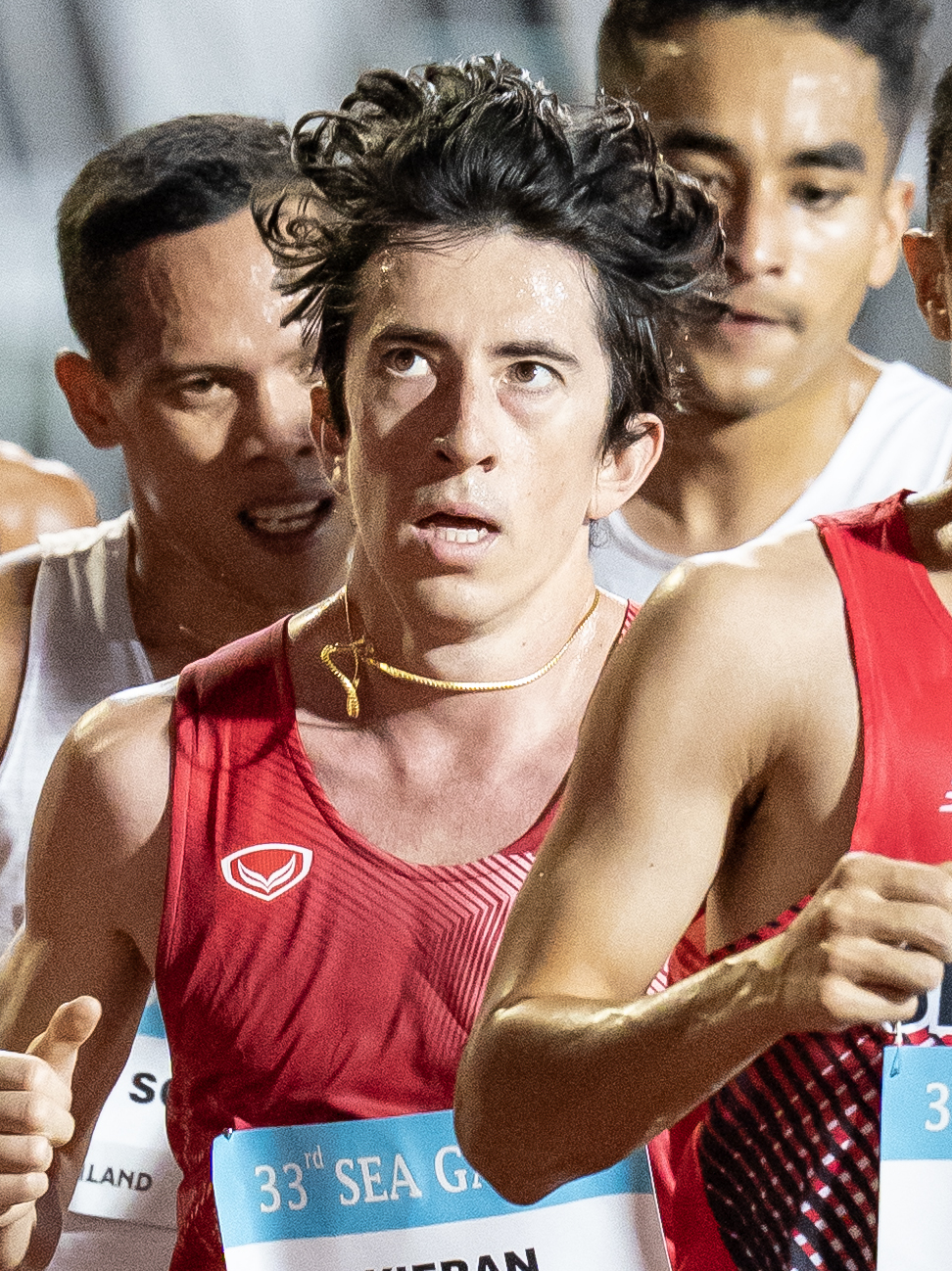
- Tuntivate at the 2025 Southeast Asian Games

Personal information
- Nationality: American; Thai
- Born: February 16, 1997 (age 29) Washington, DC, United States
- Education: Harvard University
- Height: 1.73 m (5 ft 8 in)
- Weight: 60 kg (132 lb)

Sport
- Sport: Track, cross country
- Events: 5K, 10K
- College team: Harvard Crimson
- Club: Bowerman Track Club
- Turned pro: 2020

Achievements and titles
- Personal bests: Outdoor; 1500 m: 3:36.16 (2024) NR; Mile: 3:54.72 (2024) NR; 5000 m: 13:15.67 (2023) NR; 10,000 m: 27:17.14 (2021) NR; Indoor; 1500 m: 3:39.69 (2025) NR; Mile: 3:54.72 (2025) AR, NR; 3000 m: 7:49.15 (2020) NR; 5000 m: 13:08.41 (2022) NR
Medal record
Men's Athletics
Representing Thailand
Asian Championships
Silver medal – second place	2025 Gumi	5,000 m
Asian Games
Bronze medal – third place	2018 Jakarta-Palembang	10,000 m
Southeast Asian Games
Gold medal – first place	2019 Philippines	10,000 m
Gold medal – first place	2019 Philippines	5,000 m
Gold medal – first place	2023 Cambodia	1,500 m
Gold medal – first place	2023 Cambodia	5,000 m
Gold medal – first place	2025 Thailand	1,500 m
Gold medal – first place	2025 Thailand	5,000 m
Gold medal – first place	2025 Thailand	10,000 m

Kieran Tuntivate (Thai: คีริน ตันติเวทย์) is a Thai-American distance runner, who specializes in the 10,000 metres. After running collegiately with Harvard University, Tuntivate turned professional with the Bowerman Track Club.

== Career ==
Tuntivate was born in Washington, DC, United States, and attended the High School Charter School of Wilmington in Wilmington, Delaware.

=== 2018 ===
Tuntivate's first major international result was at the 2018 Asian Games, where he finished fourth in the 10,000 metres in 30:29.04. The following year he won the 5000 and 10000 metres at the Southeast Asian Games.

=== 2021 ===
Tuntivate qualified for the 2020 Summer Olympics in Tokyo with his time of 27:17.14. In addition, he is the first Thai (mixed American) ever who entered 10,000 metres and finished rank 23 in 29.01.92.

== International competitions ==
Year	Competition	Venue	Position	Event	Notes
Representing Thailand
2018	Asian Games	Central Jakarta, Indonesia	DNS	5,000 m	DNS
2018	Asian Games	Central Jakarta, Indonesia	3rd	10,000 m	30:29.04
2019	Southeast Asian Games	New Clark City, Philippines	1st	5,000 m	14:31.15
2019	Southeast Asian Games	New Clark City, Philippines	1st	10,000 m	30:19.28
2021	Olympic Games	Tokyo, Japan	23rd	10,000 m	29:01.92
2022	World Championships	Eugene, United States	40th (h)	5,000 m	14:19.28
2023	Southeast Asian Games	Phnom Penh, Cambodia	1st	1,500 m	3:58.51
2025	Asian Championships	Gumi, South Korea	2nd	5,000 m	13:24.97
2025	Southeast Asian Games	Bangkok, Thailand	1st	1,500 m	3:47.50
2025	Southeast Asian Games	Bangkok, Thailand	1st	5,000 m	14:46.38
2025	Southeast Asian Games	Bangkok, Thailand	1st	10,000 m	29:41.81

== Personal bests ==
Outdoor

- 1500 metres – 3:37.41 (Los Angeles, CA (USA))
- Mile – 3:57.87 (Lipscomb Academy, Nashville, TN (USA))
- 5000 metres – 13:15.67 (Stadium De Veen, Heusden-Zolder, (Belgium))
- 10000 metres - 27:17.14 (JSerra Catholic HS, San Juan Capistrano, CA (USA))

Indoor

- 1000 metres – 2:28.14 (Boston, MA (USA))
- Mile – 3:57.36 (Boston Univ. Track & Tennis Center, Boston, MA (USA))
- 3000 metres – 7:49.15 (Boston Univ. Track & Tennis Center, Boston, MA (USA))
- 5000 metres – 13:08.41 (Boston Univ. Track & Tennis Center, Boston, MA (USA))
