= Athletics at the 2018 Asian Games – Men's 10,000 metres =

Men's 10,000 metres at the 2018 Asian Games
- Venue: Gelora Bung Karno Stadium
- Date: 26 August 2018
- Competitors: 13 from 8 nations

Medalists
gold medal	Abraham Cheroben	Bahrain
silver medal	Zhao Changhong	China
bronze medal	Kieran Tuntivate	Thailand

The men's 10000 metres competition at the 2018 Asian Games took place on 26 August 2018 at the Gelora Bung Karno Stadium.

== Schedule ==
All times are Western Indonesia Time (UTC+07:00)

Date	Time	Event
Sunday, 26 August 2018	19:20	Final

== Records ==
Prior to this competition, the existing world, Asian and Games records were as follows.

World Record	Kenenisa Bekele (ETH)	26:17.53	Brussels, Belgium	26 August 2005
Asian Record	Ahmad Hassan Abdullah (QAT)	26:38.76	Brussels, Belgium	5 September 2003
Games Record	Bilisuma Shugi (BRN)	27:32.72	Guangzhou, China	26 November 2010

== Results ==
Legend

- DNF — Did not finish
- DSQ — Disqualified

Rank	Athlete	Time	Notes
1st place, gold medalist(s)	Abraham Cheroben (BRN)	29:00.29	
2nd place, silver medalist(s)	Zhao Changhong (CHN)	30:07.49	
3rd place, bronze medalist(s)	Kieran Tuntivate (THA)	30:29.04	
4	Zhu Renxue (CHN)	30:57.13	
5	Narandulamyn Mönkhbayar (MGL)	31:28.00	
6	Mohanad Ali (PLE)	31:44.14	
7	Welman David Pasaribu (INA)	31:46.56	
8	Robi Syianturi (INA)	31:51.76	
9	Boonthung Srisung (THA)	32:24.72	
10	Dambadarjaagiin Gantulga (MGL)	33:49.84	
—	Abdulaziz Al-Abdi (YEM)	DNF	
—	Govindan Lakshmanan (IND)	DSQ	
DQ	Hassan Chani (BRN)	~~28:35.54~~	

- Hassan Chani of Bahrain originally won the gold medal, but was disqualified because of his biological passport abnormalities.
