= Hassan Chani =

Bahraini long-distance runner

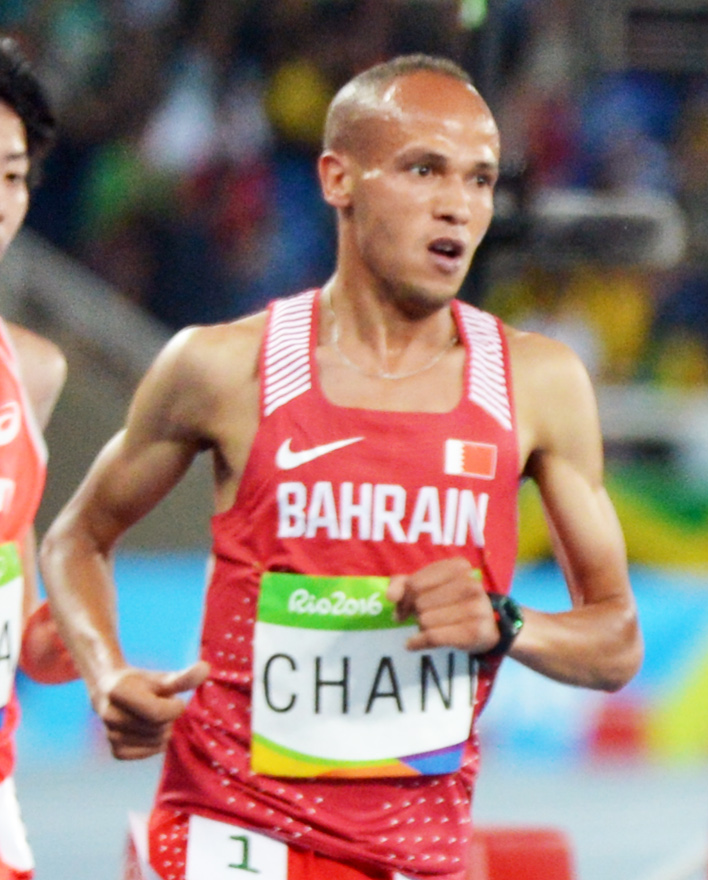
- Hassan Chani at the 2016 Olympics

Personal information
- Nationality: Bahraini
- Born: 5 May 1988 (age 38) Morocco

Sport
- Sport: Athletics

Achievements and titles
- Olympic finals: 2016
Medal record
Representing Bahrain
Asian Games
Disqualified	2018 Jakarta	10,000 m

Hassan Chani (born 5 May 1988) is a Moroccan born Bahraini long-distance runner.

He changed his nationality to represent Bahrain at the 2016 Summer Olympics in Rio de Janeiro, in the men's 10,000 metres. In 2020 he was banned by the Athletics Integrity Unit for blood doping. He was also stripped of the silver medal won at the 2018 Jakarta Asian Games.
