= Athletics at the 2018 Asian Games – Women's 5000 metres =

Women's 5000 metres at the 2018 Asian Games
- Venue: Gelora Bung Karno Stadium
- Date: 28 August 2018
- Competitors: 15 from 11 nations

Medalists
gold medal	Kalkidan Gezahegne	Bahrain
silver medal	Darya Maslova	Kyrgyzstan
bronze medal	Bontu Rebitu	Bahrain

The women's 5000 metres competition at the 2018 Asian Games took place on 28 August 2018 at the Gelora Bung Karno Stadium.

== Schedule ==
All times are Western Indonesia Time (UTC+07:00)

Date	Time	Event
Tuesday, 28 August 2018	19:50	Final

== Records ==
Prior to this competition, the existing world, Asian and Games records were as follows.

World Record	Tirunesh Dibaba (ETH)	14:11.15	Beijing, China	6 June 2008
Asian Record	Jiang Bo (CHN)	14:28.09	Shanghai, China	23 October 1997
Games Record	Sun Yingjie (CHN)	14:40.41	Busan, South Korea	12 October 2002

== Results ==
Rank	Athlete	Time	Notes
1st place, gold medalist(s)	Kalkidan Gezahegne (BRN)	15:08.08	
2nd place, silver medalist(s)	Darya Maslova (KGZ)	15:30.57	
3rd place, bronze medalist(s)	Bontu Rebitu (BRN)	15:36.78	
4	Rina Nabeshima (JPN)	15:40.37	
5	Suriya Loganathan (IND)	15:49.30	
6	Minami Yamanouchi (JPN)	15:52.48	
7	Sitora Hamidova (UZB)	16:00.55	
8	Alia Saeed Mohammed (UAE)	16:09.49	
9	Li Dan (CHN)	16:18.91	
10	Tamara Armoush (JOR)	16:44.98	
11	Odekta Elvina Naibaho (INA)	17:20.90	
12	Bishwarupa Budha (NEP)	17:24.78	
13	Rubia Martins (TLS)	17:35.86	
14	Angela Araújo (TLS)	17:57.85	
DQ	Sanjivani Jadhav (IND)	~~15:52.96~~	

- Sanjivani Jadhav of India originally finished seventh, but due to the positive result of the test for probenecid, the Athletics Integrity Unit declared to invalidate all results achieved from 29 June 2018 by her.
