= 2019 Arab Athletics Championships =

21st Arab Athletics Championships
- Dates: 5–8 April 2019
- Host city: Cairo, Egypt
- Venue: Cairo International Stadium
- Events: 44

The 2019 Arab Athletics Championships was the twentieth edition of the international athletics competition between Arab countries that took place from 5–8 April 2019 at Cairo, Egypt.

The medal table was topped by Bahrain followed by Morocco and the host nation Egypt.

== Medal summary ==
=== Men ===
Event	Gold		Silver		Bronze	
100 metres (Wind: -1.4 m/s)	Abdo Barka (BHR)	10.40	Andrew Fisher (BHR)	10.50	Mehdi Takordmioui (MAR)	10.56
200 metres	Mehdi Takordmioui (MAR)	20.70	Yousef Karam (KUW)	20.81	Fahad Mohamed Al-Subaie (KSA)	20.84
400 metres	Abbas Abubakar Abbas (BHR)	45.90	Yousef Karam (KUW)	46.06	Mazin Motan Al-Yasin (KSA)	47.56
800 metres	Riad El Chenini (TUN)	1:51.22	Abdessalem Ayouni (TUN)	1:51.31	Fouad Elkaam (MAR)	1:51.37
1500 metres	Ayanleh Souleiman (DJI)	3:43.84	Brahim Kaazouzi (MAR)	3:43.87	Abraham Rotich (BHR)	3:44.34
5000 metres	Birhanu Balew (BHR)	13:33.72	Albert Rop (BHR)	13:35.79	Soufiyan Bouqantar (MAR)	13:37.91
10,000 metres	Albert Rop (BHR)	28:21.08	Jamal Hitrane (MAR)	28:42.43	Ibrahim Hassan Bouh (DJI)	28:43.90
110 metres hurdles (wind: -1.0 m/s)	Yaqoub Mohamed Al-Youha (KUW)	13.74	Ahmad Al-Moualed (KSA)	13.90	Amine Bouanani (ALG)	14.15
400 metres hurdles	Abdelmalik Lahoulou (ALG)	48.95 CR	Saber Boukamouche (ALG)	50.41	Abdullah Rezgallah Al-Melihi (KSA)	50.72
3000 metres steeplechase	John Kibet Koech (BHR)	8:30.75	Salim Mohammed Salim (EGY)	8:33.96 NR	Mohammed Tindoufti (MAR)	8:44.51
4 × 100 metres relay	Saudi Arabia; Ahmed Majrachi; Mohammed Dawood Abdullah; Fahad Mohamed Al-Subaie; Ali Khalid Mas	39.79	Bahrain; Hussein Ashour Ahmed; Mohamed Yacoub Salem; Abdo Barka; Andrew Fisher	39.91	Oman; Mohamed Al-Balushi; Ammar Al-Saifi; Mohamed Obaid Al-Saadi; Khalid Saleh Al-Ghailani	40.22
4 × 400 metres relay	Iraq; Yasser Ali Mohamed; Ehab Jabhar Hashim; Mohamed Abdul Ridha; Taha Hussein Yaseen	3:06.23 NR	Algeria; Slimane Moula; Miloud Laaredj; Fethi Benchaa; Abdelmalik Lahoulou	3:07.85	Oman; Youssef Omrani; Usama Al-Gheilani; Hatem Al-Badri; Othman Al-Boussaidi	3:11.82
20 km walk	Mohamed Ragab Saleh (EGY)	1:23:15 NR	Mohamed Ameur (ALG)	1:25:37	Raouf Ben El Abhi (TUN)	1:26:36
High jump	Hussein Falah Al-Ibraheemi (IRQ)	2.17 m	Marouane Kacimi (MAR)	2.14 m	Mohamed Talaat Ahmed (EGY)	2.05 m
Pole vault	Muntaher Faleh Abdulwahid (IRQ)	5.10 m	Hichem Cherabi (ALG)	5.10 m	Thulfiqar Hayder Al-Taie (IRQ)	5.00 m
Long jump	Yahya Berrabah (MAR)	8.03 m	Yasser Triki (ALG)	7.97 m	Marouane Kacimi (MAR)	7.82 m
Triple jump	Yasser Triki (ALG)	16.50 m	Hamza Mabchour (MAR)	15.98 m	Khaled Al-Subaie (KUW)	15.69 m
Shot put	Mostafa Amr Hassan (EGY)	20.60 m	Mohamed Magdi Hamza Khalif (EGY)	20.39 m	Meshari Suroor Saad (KUW)	19.08 m
Discus throw	El Bachir Mbarki (MAR)	53.56 m	Moath Mohamed Mustafa Ahmad (EGY)	52.49 m	Omar Tareq Salah El Din (EGY)	52.38 m
Hammer throw	Ali Al-Zinkawi (KUW)	73.49 m	Alaa El-Din Mohamed El-Ashry (EGY)	72.69 m	Islam Saad Abou Seri Mohamed (EGY)	72.14 m
Javelin throw	Majid Mohsen Ali Al-Badri (EGY)	75.63 m	Younis Mohsen Saleh (IRQ)	75.42 m NR	Bahaa Abdelwareth (EGY)	74.18 m
Decathlon	Majed Radhi Mubarak Al-Sayed (KUW)	7232 pts	Mustafa Mohamed Ramadan (EGY)	7190 pts	Abdel-Sajjad Saadoun Nasser (IRQ)	6837 pts

=== Women ===
Event	Gold		Silver		Bronze	
100 metres (wind: -1.8 m/s)	Hajar Al-Khaldi (BHR)	12.05	Iman Isa Jassim (BHR)	12.08	Assia Raziki (MAR)	12.09
200 metres	Salwa Eid Naser (BHR)	23.45	Dana Hussain (IRQ)	24.11k	Hajar Al-Khaldi (BHR)	24.34
400 metres	Salwa Eid Naser (BHR)	52.72	Assia Raziki (MAR)	53.73	Iman Mansour Abdul Muttalib (EGY)	54.43
800 metres	Halima Hachlaf (MAR)	2:07.95	Amina Bakhit (SUD)	2:08.38	Marta Hirpato (BHR)	2:08.55
1500 metres	Malika Akkaoui (MAR)	4:29.10	Amina Bakhit (SUD)	4:31.08	Oumaima Saoud (MAR)	4:31.55
5000 metres	Winfred Yavi (BHR)	17:15.08	Kaoutar Farkoussi (MAR)	17:25.08	Fatima Ezzahra Gardadi (MAR)	17:37.28
10,000 metres	Hanane Kallouch (MAR)	36:14.75	Amina Tahri (MAR)	36:27.43	Hudi Rida Zayn Al Eabdyn (EGY)	39:08.47
100 metres hurdles (wind: +0.9 m/s)	Lamiae Lhabze (MAR)	14.31	Aminat Yusuf Jamal (BHR)	14.66	Sanae Zouine Duar (MAR)	14.83
400 metres hurdles	Aminat Yusuf Jamal (BHR)	57.05	Lamiae Lhabze (MAR)	59.05	Loubna Benhadja (ALG)	59.21
3000 metres steeplechase	Winfred Yavi (BHR)	10:07.62	Ikram Ouaaziz (MAR)	10:20.31	Tigist Getent (BHR)	10:27.84
4×100 metres relay	Bahrain; Fatima Moubarak; Iman Isa Jassim; Hajar Al-Khaldi; Salwa Eid Naser	45.18	Egypt; Nuha Abu Dheif Ali; Dina Waleed Shaker Sadiq; Maram Mahmoud Ahmed; Hoda Hagras	46.85	Lebanon; Ola Baajour; Diala El Khazen; Christel El Saneh; Aziza Sbaity	47.83
4×400 metres relay	Bahrain; Aminat Yusuf Jamal; Marta Hirpato; Tigist Gashaw; Zainab Ali Mohamed	3:48.60	Morocco; Oumaima Saoud; Halima Hachlaf; Kaoutar Farkoussi; Malika Akkaoui	3:49.85	Egypt; Safa Mahmoud Ali; Fawzia Kheir; Hala Sedqi Ali; Eman Abdelmotaleb	3:50.19 NR
10 km walk	Souad Azzi (ALG)	47:22 NR	Chahineze Nasri (TUN)	48:32	Bariza Ghezelani (ALG)	50:00
High jump	Reham Hamdi Kamal (EGY)	1.76 m	Basant Massad Mohamed (EGY)	1.76 m	Fatima Zahra El Alaoui (MAR)	1.73 m
Pole vault	Dorra Mahfoudhi (TUN)	4.00 m	Donia Ahmed El Tabagh (EGY)	3.90 m	Only 2 competitors	
Long jump	Esraa Owis (EGY)	6.09 m	Yousra Lajdoud (MAR)	5.97 m	Jamaa Chnaik (MAR)	5.86 m
Triple jump	Jamaa Chnaik (MAR)	13.05 m	Esraa Owis (EGY)	12.70 m	Mariam Ellouk (MAR)	12.42 m
Shot put	Noora Salem Jasim (BHR)	17.93 m	Marihan Mohammad Ahmad (EGY)	14.54 m	Zainab Zeroual (MAR)	13.43 m
Discus throw	Noora Salem Jasim (BHR)	46.23 m	Amira Khaled Mahmoud (EGY)	45.04 m	Fatima Youssef Al-Hosani (UAE)	42.23 m
Hammer throw	Rawan Ayman Ibrahim Barakat (EGY)	65.90 m	Zouina Bouzebra (ALG)	63.07 m	Soukana Zakkour (MAR)	61.00 m
Javelin throw	Salma Mohsin Shams Al-Din (EGY)	47.47 m	Sherine Shaaban Ahmed (EGY)	47.13 m	Nada Cheroudi (TUN)	45.16 m
Heptathlon	Nada Chroudi (TUN)	5515 pts	Hoda Hagras (EGY)	5215 Pts	Noura Ennadi (MAR)	4932 Pts

== Medal table ==
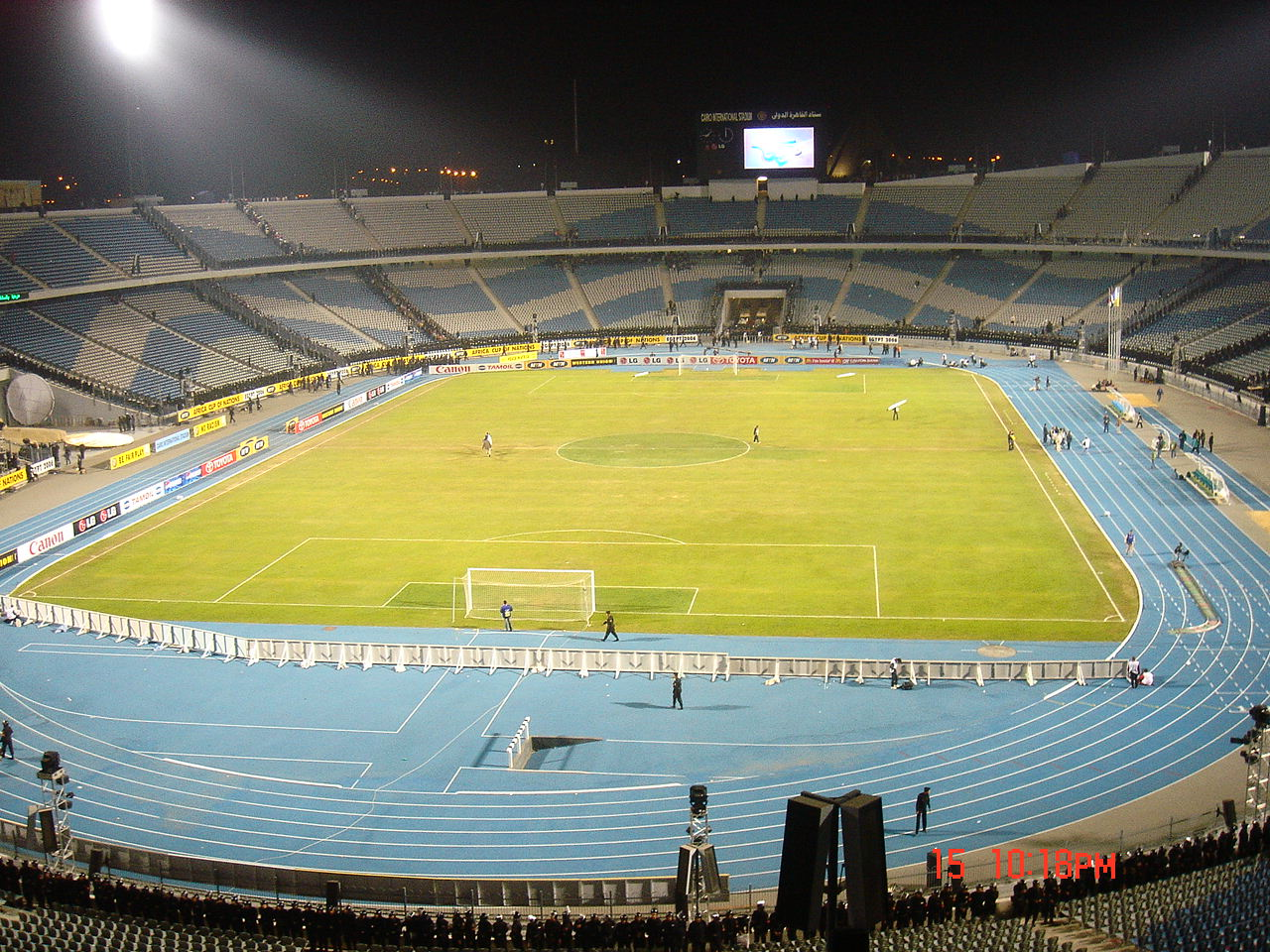
The host stadium

Key

The host country is highlighted in lavender blue

Rank	Nation	Gold	Silver	Bronze	Total
1	Bahrain	15	5	4	24
2	Morocco	8	11	15	34
3	Egypt*	7	13	7	27
4	Algeria	3	6	3	12
5	Iraq	3	2	2	7
5	Kuwait	3	2	2	7
5	Tunisia	3	2	2	7
8	Saudi Arabia	1	1	3	5
9	Djibouti	1	0	1	2
10	Sudan	0	2	0	2
11	Oman	0	0	2	2
12	Lebanon	0	0	1	1
12	United Arab Emirates	0	0	1	1
Totals (13 entries)		44	44	43	131
