= Athletics at the 2018 Asian Games – Women's shot put =

Women's shot put at the 2018 Asian Games
- Venue: Gelora Bung Karno Stadium
- Date: 26 August 2018
- Competitors: 8 from 7 nations

Medalists
gold medal	Gong Lijiao	China
silver medal	Gao Yang	China
bronze medal	Noora Salem Jasim	Bahrain

The women's shot put competition at the 2018 Asian Games took place on 26 August 2018 at the Gelora Bung Karno Stadium.

== Schedule ==
All times are Western Indonesia Time (UTC+07:00)

Date	Time	Event
Sunday, 26 August 2018	18:30	Final

== Records ==
Prior to this competition, the existing world, Asian and Games records were as follows.

World Record	Natalya Lisovskaya (URS)	22.63	Moscow, Soviet Union	7 June 1987
Asian Record	Li Meisu (CHN)	21.76	Shijiazhuang, China	23 April 1988
Games Record	Sui Xinmei (CHN)	20.55	Beijing, China	1 October 1990

== Results ==
Rank	Athlete	Attempt						Result	Notes
Rank	Athlete	1	2	3	4	5	6	Result	Notes
1st place, gold medalist(s)	Gong Lijiao (CHN)	19.09	19.43	19.19	X	19.26	19.66	19.66	
2nd place, silver medalist(s)	Gao Yang (CHN)	16.75	16.69	17.55	17.01	X	17.64	17.64	
3rd place, bronze medalist(s)	Noora Salem Jasim (BRN)	17.11	X	16.69	16.73	16.87	16.41	17.11	
4	Lin Chia-ying (TPE)	16.26	15.55	X	X	X	16.30	16.30	
5	Elena Smolyanova (UZB)	15.73	X	X	15.41	X	15.74	15.74	
6	Lee Mi-young (KOR)	14.98	15.42	X	15.49	15.25	X	15.49	
7	Eki Febri Ekawati (INA)	14.42	14.39	X	13.87	14.61	14.60	14.61	
8	Areerat Intadis (THA)	13.72	13.56	14.50	X	X	14.04	14.50	
