= Athletics at the 2018 Asian Games – Men's 5000 metres =

Men's 5000 metres at the 2018 Asian Games
- Venue: Gelora Bung Karno Stadium
- Date: 30 August 2018
- Competitors: 15 from 12 nations

Medalists
| gold medal | Birhanu Balew | Bahrain |
| silver medal | Albert Rop | Bahrain |
| bronze medal | Tariq Al-Amri | Saudi Arabia |

The men's 5000 metres competition at the 2018 Asian Games took place on 30 August 2018 at the Gelora Bung Karno Stadium.

== Schedule ==
All times are Western Indonesia Time (UTC+07:00)

| Date | Time | Event |
|---|---|---|
| Thursday, 30 August 2018 | 20:00 | Final |

== Records ==
Prior to this competition, the existing world, Asian and Games records were as follows.

| World Record | Kenenisa Bekele (ETH) | 12:37.35 | Hengelo, Netherlands | 31 May 2004 |
| Asian Record | Albert Rop (BRN) | 12:51.96 | Monaco | 19 July 2013 |
| Games Record | Mohamad Al-Garni (QAT) | 13:26.13 | Incheon, South Korea | 27 September 2014 |

== Results ==
Legend

- DNS — Did not start

| Rank | Athlete | Time | Notes |
|---|---|---|---|
| 1st place, gold medalist(s) | Birhanu Balew (BRN) | 13:43.17 | |
| 2nd place, silver medalist(s) | Albert Rop (BRN) | 13:43.76 | |
| 3rd place, bronze medalist(s) | Tariq Al-Amri (KSA) | 13:56.49 | |
| 4 | Hossein Keyhani (IRI) | 14:08.69 | |
| 5 | Yaser Bagharab (QAT) | 14:16.68 | |
| 6 | Govindan Lakshmanan (IND) | 14:17.09 | |
| 7 | Nguyễn Văn Lai (VIE) | 14:56.09 | |
| 8 | Syamsuddin Massa (INA) | 15:03.76 | |
| 9 | Nabil Al-Garbi (YEM) | 15:04.85 | |
| 10 | Nursultan Keneshbekov (KGZ) | 15:07.59 | |
| 11 | Abdulaziz Al-Abdi (YEM) | 15:09.14 | |
| 12 | Felisberto de Deus (TLS) | 15:10.71 | |
| — | Dambadarjaagiin Gantulga (MGL) | DNS | |
| — | Narandulamyn Mönkhbayar (MGL) | DNS | |
| — | Kieran Tuntivate (THA) | DNS | |
