= Komail Mahfoodh =

Bahraini handball player

Personal information
- Full name: Komail Ali Mahfoodh
- Nationality: Bahraini
- Born: 28 April 1992 (age 34)
- Height: 1.89 m (6 ft 2 in)

Sport
- Sport: Handball
- Position: Left back
- Current club: Al-Najma
- Number: 66
National team
Years	Team	Apps	(Gls)
–	Bahrain	55	(104)
Medal record
Asian Games
Silver medal – second place	2018 Indonesia	Team

Komail Ali Mahfoodh (Arabic: كميل علي محفوظ. born 28 April 1992) is a Bahraini handball player for Al-Najma and the Bahraini national team.

He participated at the 2017 World Men's Handball Championship and at the delayed 2020 Summer Olympics.
