= Oksana Luneva =

Kyrgyzstani sprinter

Personal information
- Born: 2 August 1979 (age 47)

Sport
- Sport: Track and field

Oksana Luneva (born 2 August 1979) is a Kyrgyz sprinter who specialized in the 400 metres.

She competed at the Olympic Games in 2000 and 2004, but without reaching the final.

Her personal best time was 52.14 seconds, achieved in July 2004 in Bishkek.
