= Athletics at the 2018 Asian Games – Women's 1500 metres =

Women's 1500 metres at the 2018 Asian Games
- Venue: Gelora Bung Karno Stadium
- Date: 30 August 2018
- Competitors: 20 from 16 nations

Medalists
gold medal	Kalkidan Gezahegne	Bahrain
silver medal	Tigist Gashaw	Bahrain
bronze medal	P. U. Chitra	India

The women's 1500 metres competition at the 2018 Asian Games took place on 30 August 2018 at the Gelora Bung Karno Stadium.

== Schedule ==
All times are Western Indonesia Time (UTC+07:00)

Date	Time	Event
Thursday, 30 August 2018	19:20	Final

== Records ==
Prior to this competition, the existing world, Asian and Games records were as follows.

World Record	Genzebe Dibaba (ETH)	3:50.07	Monaco	17 July 2015
Asian Record	Qu Yunxia (CHN)	3:50.46	Beijing, China	11 September 1993
Games Record	Sunita Rani (IND)	4:06.03	Busan, South Korea	10 October 2002

== Results ==
Legend

- DNS — Did not start

Rank	Athlete	Time	Notes
1st place, gold medalist(s)	Kalkidan Gezahegne (BRN)	4:07.88	
2nd place, silver medalist(s)	Tigist Gashaw (BRN)	4:09.12	
3rd place, bronze medalist(s)	P. U. Chitra (IND)	4:12.56	
4	Nguyễn Thị Oanh (VIE)	4:15.49	
5	Zheng Xiaoqian (CHN)	4:16.35	
6	Zhong Xiaoqian (CHN)	4:16.50	
7	Kim Son-hui (PRK)	4:20.77	
8	Tamara Armoush (JOR)	4:23.59	
9	Gulshanoi Satarova (KGZ)	4:23.72	
10	Tatyana Neroznak (KAZ)	4:29.86	
11	Kim Ga-kyeong (KOR)	4:32.31	
12	Angela Araújo (TLS)	4:33.90	
13	Chuluunkhüügiin Shinetsetseg (MGL)	4:34.17	
14	Saraswati Bhattarai (NEP)	4:34.26	
15	Lodkeo Inthakoumman (LAO)	4:40.26	
16	Bektiningsih Prima Dian Fitri (INA)	4:46.93	
17	Ermelinda Ornai (TLS)	5:13.09	
18	Aminath Jaaisha Juneez (MDV)	5:14.38	
19	Entesar Al-Madhfari (YEM)	5:32.68	
—	Monika Chaudhary (IND)	DNS	
