= Bilal Basham =

Bahraini handball player

Personal information
- Full name: Bilal Basham Askani
- Nationality: Bahraini
- Born: 7 April 1991 (age 35) Bahrain
- Height: 1.74 m (5 ft 9 in)

Sport
- Sport: Handball
- Position: Right wing
- Current club: Al Ahli Club
- Number: 27
National team
Years	Team	Apps	(Gls)
–	Bahrain	52	(151)
Medal record
Asian Games
Silver medal – second place	2018 Indonesia	Team
Bronze medal – third place	2014 South Korea	Team
Asian Championship
Silver medal – second place	2022 Saudi Arabia
Silver medal – second place	2018 South Korea
Bronze medal – third place	2024 Bahrain	Team

Bilal Basham Askani (Arabic: بلال بشام إسكاني, born 7 April 1991), known as Bilal Basham or Bilal Askani, is a Bahraini handball player for Al-Ahli Club and the Bahraini national team.

He participated at the 2017 World Men's Handball Championship and at the delayed 2020 Summer Olympics.
