= Kalkidan Gezahegne =

Ethiopian-born Bahrani middle-distance runner

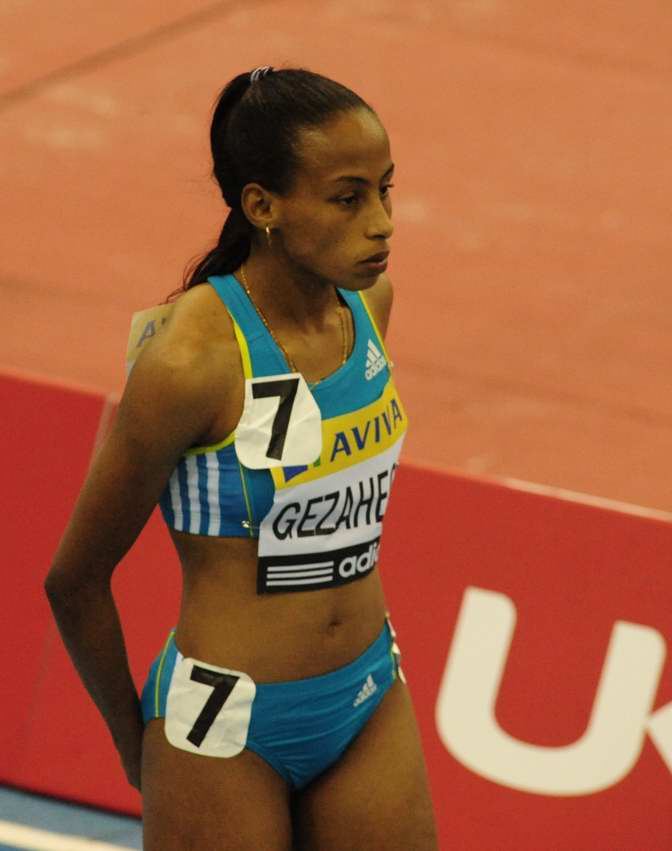
- Gezahegne in 2010

Personal information
- Citizenship: Bahraini
- Born: 8 May 1991 (age 35) Addis Ababa, Ethiopia

Sport
- Country: Bahrain
- Sport: Athletics
- Events: Middle-, Long-distance running

Achievements and titles
- Personal bests: 10,000 m: 29:50.77 NR (2021); 10 km: 29:38 (2021); Indoor; Mile: 4:24.10i WU20R (2010)
Medal record
Women's athletics
Representing Ethiopia
World Indoor Championships
Gold medal – first place	2010 Doha	1500 m
World Junior Championships
Silver medal – second place	2008 Bydgoszcz	1500 m
African Junior Championships
Silver medal – second place	2009 Bambous	1500 m
Representing Bahrain
Olympic Games
Silver medal – second place	2020 Tokyo	10,000 m
Asian Games
Gold medal – first place	2018 Jakarta–Palembang	1500 m
Gold medal – first place	2018 Jakarta–Palembang	5000 m

Kalkidan Gezahegne (born 8 May 1991) is an Ethiopian-born Bahraini middle- and long-distance runner. She is the 10,000 metres 2020 Tokyo Olympics silver medallist. 11 years earlier, at age 18, Gezahegne became the youngest ever female World indoor champion when winning 1500 metres.

17-year-old Gezahegne won a silver medal over the 1500m at the 2008 World Junior Championships. She represented Ethiopia before acquiring Bahraini citizenship in 2013.

== Life and career ==
Kalkidan Gezahegne was born in Addis Ababa. She won the silver medal in the 1500 metres at the 2008 World Junior Championships and won another junior silver at the 2009 African Junior Athletics Championships, finishing behind Caster Semenya. Moving up to the senior level, Kalkidan finished eighth in the 1500 m race at the 2009 World Championships and fifth in the 3000 metres at the 2009 World Athletics Final.

Competing at the 2010 IAAF World Indoor Championships, she had a startling comeback to qualify for the final. In the middle of her heat, she collided with Russia's Yevgeniya Zolotova and fell onto the track. She got back up to continue the race, however, and not only caught up with her competitors, but won the race with the fastest time of any runner that day. In the final she outdid compatriot and reigning champion Gelete Burka to win the gold medal. This made the 18-year-old the youngest ever winner of an event at the IAAF World Indoor Championships, beating the previous record set by Gabriela Szabo 15 years earlier. She missed the outdoor season that year due to injury.

On 3 October 2021, Gezahegne broke the world record for the 10 km road race at The Giants Geneva event, running 29:38 and surpassing the previous mark by 5 seconds.

== Achievements ==
=== International competitions ===
Year	Competition	Venue	Position	Event	Time
Representing Ethiopia
2008	World Junior Championships	Bydgoszcz, Poland	2nd	1500 m	4:16.58
2009	African Junior Championships	Bambous, Mauritius	2nd	1500 m	4:09.36
2009	World Championships	Berlin, Germany	8th	1500 m	4:08.81
2010	World Indoor Championships	Doha, Qatar	1st	1500 m i	4:08.14
2011	World Championships	Daegu, South Korea	5th	1500 m	4:06.42
Representing Bahrain
2017	World Championships	London, United Kingdom	14th	5000 m	
2018	West Asian Championships	Amman, Jordan	2nd	1500 m	4:15.24
2018	West Asian Championships	Amman, Jordan	2nd	5000 m	16:35.46
2018	Asian Games	Jakarta, Indonesia	1st	1500 m	4:07.88
2018	Asian Games	Jakarta, Indonesia	1st	5000 m	15:08.08
2021	Olympic Games	Tokyo, Japan	2nd	10,000 m	29:56.18

=== Personal bests ===
Event	Time (m:s)	Date	Venue	Notes
1500 metres	4:00.97	29 May 2011	Hengelo, Netherlands	
1500 metres indoor	4:03.28	10 February 2010	Stockholm, Sweden	
One mile	4:37.76	7 September 2008	Rieti, Italy	
One mile indoor	4:24.10	20 February 2010	Birmingham, United Kingdom	World under-20 record
3000 metres	8:34.65	4 September 2018	Zagreb, Croatia	
3000 metres indoor	8:37.47	19 February 2011	Birmingham, United Kingdom	
5000 metres	14:52.92	1 June 2021	Montreuil, Seine-Saint-Denis, France	
10,000 metres	29:50.77	8 May 2021	Maia, Portugal	NR
10 km (road)	29:38	3 October 2021	Geneva, Switzerland	
Half marathon	1:05:47	12 December 2021	Manama, Bahrain	
