= Tigist Gashaw =

Bahraini middle-distance runner

Personal information
- Born: 25 December 1996 (age 29)

Sport
- Sport: Athletics
- Event: 1500 metres
Medal record
Women's athletics
Representing Bahrain
Asian Indoor Championships
Silver medal – second place	2016 Doha	1500 m

Tigist Gashaw Belay (born 25 December 1996) is an Ethiopian-born middle-distance runner competing internationally for Bahrain. She represented that country at the 2016 Summer Olympics without advancing from the first round. Earlier she won the gold at the 2013 World Youth Championships starting for her native Ethiopia.

== International competitions ==
Year	Competition	Venue	Position	Event	Notes
Representing Ethiopia
2013	World Youth Championships	Donetsk, Ukraine	1st	1500 m	4:14.25
2013	African Junior Championships	Bambous, Mauritius	2nd	1500 m	4:12.38
Representing Bahrain
2016	Asian Indoor Championships	Doha, Qatar	2nd	1500 m	4:22.17
2016	Olympic Games	Rio de Janeiro, Brazil	23rd (h)	1500 m	4:10.96
2017	Islamic Solidarity Games	Baku, Azerbaijan	4th	1500 m	4:21.31
2018	West Asian Championships	Amman, Jordan	2nd	800 m	2:12.10
2018	West Asian Championships	Amman, Jordan	1st	1500 m	4:13.16
2018	Asian Games	Jakarta, Indonesia	2nd	1500 m	4:09.12
2019	Arab Championships	Cairo, Egypt	4th	1500 m	4:32.03
2019	Arab Championships	Cairo, Egypt	1st	4 x 400 m relay	3:48.60
2019	Asian Championships	Doha, Qatar	2nd	1500 m	4:14.81
2019	World Championships	Doha, Qatar	–	5000 m	DNF
2021	Arab Championships	Radès, Tunisia	1st	1500 m	4:18.33
2021	Arab Championships	Radès, Tunisia	2nd	5000 m	16:17.30
2025	World Championships	Tokyo, Japan	–	Marathon	DNF

== Personal bests ==
Outdoor

- 800 metres – 2:05.11 (Amiens 2014)
- 1500 metres – 4:05.58 (Székesfehérvár 2015)
- 3000 metres – 8:48.60 (Doha 2016)

Indoor

- 1500 metres – 4:16.45 (Eaubonne 2016)
- 3000 metres – 8:55.89 (Mondeville 2016)
