= Hajar Al-Khaldi =

Bahraini sprinter (born 1995)

Hajar Saad Al-Khaldi
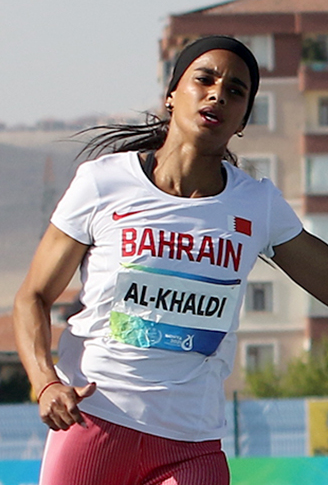

Personal information
- Born: 17 March 1995 (age 31)

Sport
- Sport: Track and field
- Event(s): 100 metres 200 metres 4×100 m relay
Medal record
Asian Games
Gold medal – first place	2018 Jakarta	4 × 100 m relay
Bronze medal – third place	2022 Hangzhou	100 m
Asian Championships
Bronze medal – third place	2019 Doha	4 × 100 m relay
Arab Games
Gold medal – first place	2023 Algeria	200 m
Gold medal – first place	2023 Algeria	4 × 100 m relay
Silver medal – second place	2023 Algeria	100 m
Military World Games
Bronze medal – third place	2019 Wuhan	4 x 100 m relay
Islamic Solidarity Games
Gold medal – first place	2017 Baku	4 x 100 m relay
Silver medal – second place	2021 Konya	4 x 100 m relay
Silver medal – second place	2025 Riyadh	4 x 100 m relay
Arab Championships
Gold medal – first place	2019 Cairo	100 m
Gold medal – first place	2019 Cairo	4 x 100 m relay
Bronze medal – third place	2019 Cairo	200 m
GCC Games
Silver medal – second place	2022 Kuwait City	4 x 100 m relay
Bronze medal – third place	2022 Kuwait City	100 m
West Asian Championships
Gold medal – first place	2018 Amman	100 m
Gold medal – first place	2018 Amman	200 m
Gold medal – first place	2018 Amman	4 x 100 m relay
Bronze medal – third place	2012 Dubai	100 m

Hajar Saad Al-Khaldi (born 17 March 1995) is a Bahraini sprinter. She competed in the women's 100 metres event at the 2016 Summer Olympics.
