= Iman Essa Jasim =

Bahraini sprinter (born 1997)

Personal information
- Born: Endurance Essien Udoh; 9 July 1997 (age 28) Nigeria

Sport
- Country: Bahrain
- Sport: Track and field
- Event: 100 metres
Medal record
Women's athletics (track and field)
Representing Bahrain
Arab Championships
Gold medal – first place	2019 Cairo	4×100 m relay
Silver medal – second place	2019 Cairo	100 metres
Bronze medal – third place	2015 Isa Town	100 metres
Asian Championships
Gold medal – first place	2019 Doha	4 × 400 m relay
Bronze medal – third place	2019 Doha	4 × 100 m relay
Asian Indoor Championships
Gold medal – first place	2016 Doha	4×400 m relay
Asian Games
Gold medal – first place	2018 Jakarta	4 × 100 m relay
Silver medal – second place	2018 Jakarta	4 × 400 m relay
Islamic Solidarity Games
Gold medal – first place	2017 Baku	4 × 100 m relay
Military World Games
Bronze medal – third place	2015 Mungyeong	4 × 400 m relay
Bronze medal – third place	2019 Wuhan	4 × 100 m relay

Iman Essa Jasim (also spelled Jassim or Jassem, born 9 July 1997) is a Bahraini sprinter. She competed in the women's 100 metres event at the 2016 Summer Olympics. She was born Endurance Essien Udoh in Nigeria on 9 July 1997.

At the 2016 Asian Indoor Athletics Championships her team which included Salwa Eid Naser, Kemi Adekoya, and Aminat Yusuf Jamal set a new Asian and Championships Record of 3:35.07 in the Women's 4 × 400 m relay event.
