= Edidiong Odiong =

Bahraini sprinter

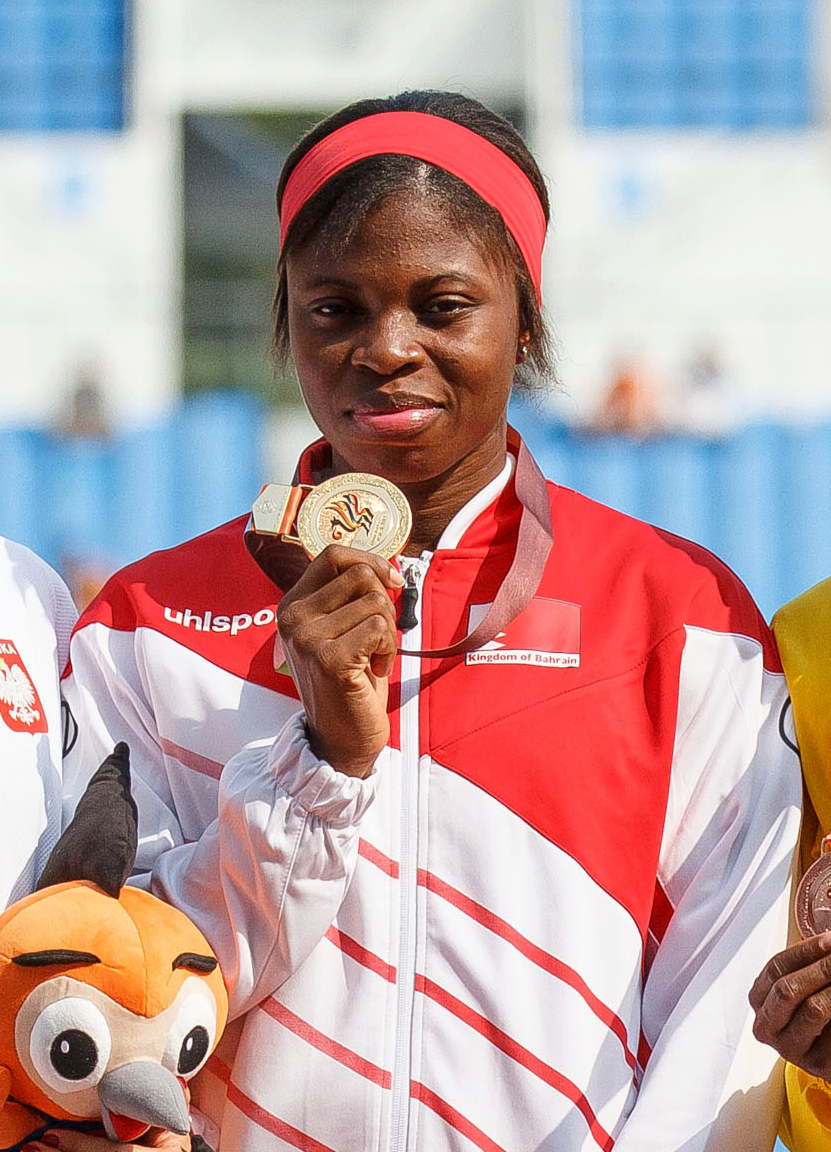
- Odiong at the 2015 Military World Games

Personal information
- Born: 13 March 1997 (age 29)
- Height: 167 cm (5 ft 6 in)
- Weight: 58 kg (128 lb)

Sport
- Sport: Athletics
- Events: 100 m, 200 m, 400 m

Achievements and titles
- Personal bests: 100 m - 11.30 (2018); 200 m – 22.62 (2018); 400 m – 53.55 (2014)
Medal record
Representing Bahrain
Asian Games
Gold medal – first place	2018 Jakarta	100 m
Gold medal – first place	2018 Jakarta	200 m
Gold medal – first place	2018 Jakarta	4 × 100 m relay
Silver medal – second place	2018 Jakarta	4 × 400 m relay
Bronze medal – third place	2022 Hangzhou	200 m
World U20 Championships
Gold medal – first place	2016 Bydgoszcz	200 m
Asian Championships
Bronze medal – third place	2019 Doha	4 × 100 m relay
Military World Games
Gold medal – first place	2015 Mungyeong	200 m
Bronze medal – third place	2015 Mungyeong	4 × 400 m relay
Bronze medal – third place	2019 Wuhan	4 × 100 m relay
Islamic Solidarity Games
Gold medal – first place	2017 Baku	200 m
Gold medal – first place	2021 Konya	100 m
Gold medal – first place	2025 Riyadh	100 m
Silver medal – second place	2021 Konya	200 m
Silver medal – second place	2025 Riyadh	4 × 100 m relay
Arab Games
Gold medal – first place	2023 Algeria	100 m
Gold medal – first place	2023 Algeria	4 × 100 m relay
Silver medal – second place	2023 Algeria	200 m
Arab Championships
Gold medal – first place	2015 Isa Town	200 m
West Asian Championships
Silver medal – second place	2018 Amman	100 m
Representing Nigeria
African Youth Games
Silver medal – second place	2014 Gaborone	400 m

Edidiong Ofinome Odiong (born 13 March 1997) is a Nigerian-born sprinter from Bahrain. She won the 200 m at the 2016 IAAF World U20 Championships and qualified in this event for the 2016 Summer Olympics.

== Early life and education ==
Odiong was born in Calabar, Nigeria. She attended Wisdom Based Academics High School.

While at Florida State University Odiong majored in international affairs.

== Athletic career ==
Odiong won the girls’ 400 m at the 2013 African Youth Athletics Championships (AYAC) in Warri, Nigeria.

Odioing competed for Nigeria at the 2014 IAAF World Junior Championships in Oregon, where she placed 6th in the 400 m final and placed 5th along with her teammates in the 4 × 400 m.

She competed at the 2018 Asian Games in Jakarta.

From 2020-2022 she competed for the Florida State Seminoles.

In summer 2023, she won the 100 metres at the Pan Arab Games in Algeria with a time of 11.27 seconds. Later in the year she defended her 200 metre championship at the Asian Games.
