= Aminat Yusuf Jamal =

Bahraini athlete

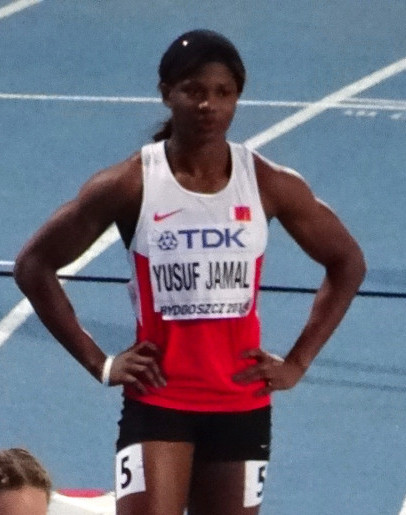
- Aminat Yusuf Jamal in 2016

Personal information
- Nationality: Bahraini
- Born: 27 June 1997 (age 29)

Sport
- Country: Bahrain
- Sport: Athletics
- Event: 400 m hurdles
Medal record
Women's athletics
Representing Bahrain
World Championships
Bronze medal – third place	2019 Doha	4 × 400 m mixed
Asian Indoor Championships
Gold medal – first place	2016 Doha	4 × 400 m

Aminat Yusuf Jamal (born 27 June 1997) is a Nigerian-born Bahraini athlete specialising in the 400 metres hurdles. She represented her adopted country at the 2017 World Championships without reaching the semi-finals. Earlier that year she won two medals at the 2017 Islamic Solidarity Games.

Her personal best in the event is 56.90 seconds set in Baku in 2017.

== International competitions ==
Year	Competition	Venue	Position	Event	Notes
Representing Bahrain
2015	Arab Championships	Isa Town, Bahrain	3rd	400 m	57.27
2016	Asian Indoor Championships	Doha	1st	4 × 400 m relay	3:35.07
2016	Arab Junior Championships	Tlemcen, Algeria	1st	100 m hurdles	14.53
2016	Arab Junior Championships	Tlemcen, Algeria	1st	400 m hurdles	58.25
2016	World U20 Championships	Bydgoszcz, Poland	6th	400 m hurdles	58.23
2016	World U20 Championships	Bydgoszcz, Poland	–	4 × 400 m relay	DQ
2017	Islamic Solidarity Games	Baku, Azerbaijan	3rd	400 m hurdles	56.90
2017	Islamic Solidarity Games	Baku, Azerbaijan	1st	4 × 400 m relay	3:32.96
2017	World Championships	London, United Kingdom	32nd (h)	400 m hurdles	57.41
2018	West Asian Championships	Amman, Jordan	1st	100 m hurdles	14.15
2018	West Asian Championships	Amman, Jordan	1st	400 m hurdles	56.75
2018	West Asian Championships	Amman, Jordan	1st	4 × 400 m relay	3:48.89
2018	Asian Games	Jakarta, Indonesia	2nd	4 × 400 m relay	3:30.61
2019	Arab Championships	Cairo, Egypt	2nd	100 m hurdles	14.66
2019	Arab Championships	Cairo, Egypt	1st	400 m hurdles	57.05
2019	Arab Championships	Cairo, Egypt	1st	4 × 400 m relay	3:48.60
2019	Asian Championships	Doha, Qatar	2nd	400 m hurdles	56.39
2019	World Championships	Doha, Qatar	17th (sf)	400 m hurdles	55.54
2021	Olympic Games	Tokyo, Japan	25th (h)	400 m hurdles	55.90
2022	World Championships	Eugene, United States	29th (h)	400 m hurdles	56.78
2022	Islamic Solidarity Games	Konya, Turkey	2nd	400 m hurdles	56.41
2022	Islamic Solidarity Games	Konya, Turkey	2nd	4 × 100 m relay	44.11
2022	Islamic Solidarity Games	Konya, Turkey	1st	4 × 400 m relay	3:33.65
2023	Arab Games	Oran, Algeria	1st	100 m hurdles	13.56
2023	Arab Games	Oran, Algeria	3rd	400 m hurdles	55.51
2023	Arab Games	Oran, Algeria	2nd	4 × 400 m relay	3:37.73
2023	Asian Games	Hangzhou, China	10th (h)	100 m hurdles	13.44
2023	Asian Games	Hangzhou, China	4th	400 m hurdles	56.84
