= Svetlana Golendova =

Kazakhstani sprinter (born 1993)

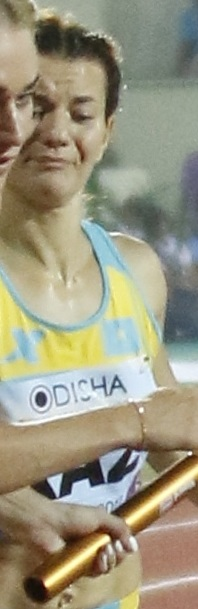
- Svetlana Golendova in 2017

Personal information
- Nationality: Kazakhstani
- Born: 25 July 1993 (age 32)

Sport
- Sport: Sprinting
- Event: 4 × 100 metres
Medal record
Women's athletics
Representing Kazakhstan
Asian Indoor Championships
Gold medal – first place	2018 Tehran	400 m
Gold medal – first place	2018 Tehran	4×400 m

Svetlana Golendova (born 25 July 1993) is a Kazakhstani sprinter. She competed in the women's 4 × 100 metres relay at the 2017 World Championships in Athletics. She was known as Svetlana Ivanchukova before her marriage to canoeist Ilya Golendov.
