= Athletics Integrity Unit =

Anti-doping agency for the sport of athletics

- Abbreviation: AIU
- Formation: April 2017; 9 years ago
- Purpose: Anti-doping in sport
- Headquarters: Monaco
- Coordinates: 43°43′57″N 7°25′29″E
- Head: Brett Clothier
- Affiliations: World Athletics
- Website: www.athleticsintegrity.org

The Athletics Integrity Unit (AIU) is a Monaco-based organization founded by World Athletics in April 2017 to combat doping and address other forms of ethical misconduct in the sport of athletics. It operates independently from World Athletics to fulfill World Anti-Doping Code requirements. It is currently headed by Brett Clothier.

The organization collected more than 3800 samples from athletes in the first six months of 2021 in advance of the 2020 Summer Olympics. In 2023, AIU announced new efforts to establish a "blood steroid passport" to better detect the presence of steroids, more commonly used in sprinting and throwing events, through blood serum and endocrine testing.

AIU argues that the number of doping bans in athletics indicates that other sports are not robustly testing athletes.

== Testing and Disciplinary Process ==
AIU conducts in-competition and out-of-competition blood and urine testing of athletes. Athletes in the Registered Testing Pool (RTP) must meet whereabouts requirements to facilitate random testing. Athletes may be tested by AIU, the World Anti-Doping Agency (WADA), the International Olympic Committee, or national anti-doping organizations. AIU has cited a preference for testing by private labs over national organizations due to potential bias in favor of athletes. Use of substances on the WADA Prohibited List without a Therapeutic Use Exemption, abnormalities in the Athlete Biological Passport, whereabouts failures, test tampering, and other doping rules violations may result in disciplinary measures.

The AIU disciplinary process includes provisional suspensions in force, pending first instance cases, and first instance decisions. Charges are brought by the AIU before the international, 47-member Disciplinary Tribunal to issue a first instance decision. These decisions may be appealed to the Court of Arbitration for Sport (CAS) by the athlete, anti-doping agency, or World Athletics. Appeals to CAS by athletes have rarely been upheld and appeals by World Athletics are generally upheld. However, World Athletics' 2023 appeals to CAS arguing that Tobi Amusan and Norah Jeruto committed anti-doping violations were dismissed. AIU maintains a list of individuals currently ineligible to participate in the sport of athletics.

AIU categorizes national athletics federations into three groups based on doping risk and athlete success at the international level, with Category A reflecting the highest combined doping risk and success and Category C reflecting the lowest. Higher categories require stronger anti-doping measures from the national federations. As of 2025, Category A includes the national athletics federations of Belarus, Bahrain, Ethiopia, Kenya, Nigeria, Russia, and Ukraine. Category B has 57 national federations and Category C has 150.

AIU may also sanction individuals for violations related to non-doping ethics violations. The only individuals currently banned by AIU for non-doping violations are two Albanian Athletics Federation officials who manipulated competition results.
