= 2018 Asian Indoor Athletics Championships – Results =

These are the results of the 2018 Asian Indoor Athletics Championships which took place between 1 and 3 February 2018 in Tehran, Iran.

== Men's results ==
=== 60 meters ===
Heats – 1 February

Rank	Heat	Name	Nationality	Time	Notes
1	2	Reza Ghasemi	Iran	6.69	Q
2	3	Hassan Taftian	Iran	6.71	Q
3	3	Barakat Al-Harthi	Oman	6.74	Q
4	3	Tosin Ogunode	Qatar	6.75	q
5	1	Elakkiyadasan Kanadasan	India	6.77	Q
6	1	Mohammed Cheshmehzar	Iran	6.79	Q
7	2	Wu Zhiqiang	China	6.82	Q
8	3	Vladislav Grigoryev	Kazakhstan	6.87	q
9	2	Ng Ka Fung	Hong Kong	6.90	
10	1	Husain Al-Sheehah	Kuwait	6.91	
11	3	Noureddin Hadid	Lebanon	6.92	
12	2	Christophe Boulos	Lebanon	6.93	
13	1	Vitaliy Zems	Kazakhstan	6.99	
13	3	Aligadzhi Magamedgadzhiev	Kyrgyzstan	6.99	
15	2	Mohammed Sadath	India	7.05	
16	1	Tanveer Hussain	Pakistan	7.06	
17	1	Chong Kuan Hou	Macau	7.14	
	1	Akmulla	Iraq	DNS	
	2	Meshaal Al-Mutairi	Kuwait	DNS	
	2	Guvanch Mattaganov	Turkmenistan	DNS	
	3	Mohammed Al-Tameemi	Iraq	DNS	

Final – 1 February

Rank	Lane	Name	Nationality	Time	Notes
1st place, gold medalist(s)	5	Hassan Taftian	Iran	6.51	CR, NR
2nd place, silver medalist(s)	6	Tosin Ogunode	Qatar	6.63	
3rd place, bronze medalist(s)	2	Elakkiyadasan Kanadasan	India	6.67	
4	4	Reza Ghasemi	Iran	6.71	
5	3	Barakat Al-Harthi	Oman	6.72	
5	7	Mohammed Cheshmehzar	Iran	6.72	
7	1	Wu Zhiqiang	China	6.84	
8	8	Vladislav Grigoryev	Kazakhstan	6.88	

=== 400 meters ===
Heats – 1 February

Rank	Heat	Name	Nationality	Time	Notes
1	2	Youssef Karam Taher	Kuwait	47.06	Q, NR
2	2	Mohamed Nasir Abbas	Qatar	47.69	q
3	3	Abdalelah Haroun	Qatar	48.18	Q
4	3	Mikhail Litvin	Kazakhstan	48.35	q
5	3	Sajjad Hashemi	Iran	48.81	q
6	1	Ali Khadivar	Iran	48.86	Q
7	2	Reza Kashef	Iran	48.91	
8	3	Nokar Hussain	Pakistan	49.10	
9	1	Muhammad Nadeem	Pakistan	49.94	
10	1	Mahmoud El Daou	Lebanon	50.61	
11	1	Kirill Sarasov	Kyrgyzstan	51.30	
12	3	Qarainais Abdulaziz	Kuwait	1:00.38	
	2	Sahet Niyazov	Turkmenistan	DNF	
	1	Yasir Ali Al-Saadi	Iraq	DNS	
	2	Alkianani	Iraq	DNS	

Final – 2 February

Rank	Lane	Name	Nationality	Time	Notes
1st place, gold medalist(s)	6	Abdalelah Haroun	Qatar	46.37	
2nd place, silver medalist(s)	5	Youssef Karam Taher	Kuwait	46.66	NR
3rd place, bronze medalist(s)	4	Mohamed Nasir Abbas	Qatar	46.76	
4	1	Mikhail Litvin	Kazakhstan	47.51	
5	3	Ali Khadivar	Iran	47.57	
6	2	Sajjad Hashemi	Iran	48.40	

=== 800 meters ===
Heats – 1 February

Rank	Heat	Name	Nationality	Time	Notes
1	2	Abubaker Haydar Abdalla	Qatar	1:57.41	Q
2	2	Amir Moradi	Iran	1:57.53	Q
3	2	Pejman Yarvali	Iran	1:57.98	q
4	1	Ebrahim Al-Zofairi	Kuwait	1:58.17	Q
5	1	Mohamed Khamis Saifeldin	Qatar	1:58.24	Q
6	2	Musulman Dzholomanov	Kyrgyzstan	1:58.25	q
7	1	Igor Kondratyev	Kazakhstan	1:58.33	
8	2	Sergey Zaykov	Kazakhstan	1:58.64	
9	1	Hasan Kamrul	Bangladesh	1:59.14	
10	1	Hamid Tashakori	Iran	1:59.41	
	1	Mohammed Al-Bezaznah	Iraq	DNS	
	2	Adnan Al-Mntfage	Iraq	DNS	

Final – 2 February

Rank	Name	Nationality	Time	Notes
1st place, gold medalist(s)	Abubaker Haydar Abdalla	Qatar	1:51.98	
2nd place, silver medalist(s)	Pejman Yarvali	Iran	1:52.80	
3rd place, bronze medalist(s)	Ebrahim Al-Zofairi	Kuwait	1:52.97	
4	Amir Moradi	Iran	1:53.57	
5	Mohamed Khamis Saifeldin	Qatar	1:56.94	
6	Musulman Dzholomanov	Kyrgyzstan	1:57.98	

=== 1500 meters ===
3 February

Rank	Name	Nationality	Time	Notes
1st place, gold medalist(s)	Amir Moradi	Iran	3:53.78	
2nd place, silver medalist(s)	Yaser Saleem Bagharab	Qatar	3:53.92	
3rd place, bronze medalist(s)	Ali Fahimi	Iran	3:54.00	
4	Hamza Driouch	Qatar	3:55.93	
5	Musulman Dzholomanov	Kyrgyzstan	3:58.53	
6	Husain Kamal	Kuwait	4:06.27	
	Moslem Niadoost	Iran	DQ	
	Adnan Al-Mntfage	Iraq	DNS	

=== 3000 meters ===
1 February

Rank	Name	Nationality	Time	Notes
1st place, gold medalist(s)	Hossein Keyhani	Iran	8:37.68	
2nd place, silver medalist(s)	Yaser Saleem Bagharab	Qatar	8:38.02	
3rd place, bronze medalist(s)	Homayoun Hemmati	Iran	8:38.97	
4	Khalil Naseri	Iran	8:41.74	
5	Husain Kamal	Kuwait	9:05.03	
	Adilet Kyshtakbekov	Kyrgyzstan	DNS	

=== 60 meters hurdles ===
Heats – 2 February

Rank	Heat	Name	Nationality	Time	Notes
1	1	Zeng Jianhang	China	7.77	Q
2	1	Abdulaziz Al-Mandeel	Kuwait	7.77	Q
3	1	Hideki Omuro	Japan	7.80	Q
4	2	Cheung Wang Fung	Hong Kong	7.86	Q
5	2	Vyacheslav Zems	Kazakhstan	7.87	Q
6	1	Chan Chung Wang	Hong Kong	7.89	q
6	2	Zhang Honglin	China	7.89	Q
8	2	Milad Sayar	Iran	7.91	q
9	1	Amin Barzi	Iran	8.12	
10	2	Ho Tai Lai Costa	Macau	8.17	
11	1	Ahmad Reza Khanfari	Iran	8.29	
12	1	Ahmad Hazer	Lebanon	8.38	
	2	Fares Al-Said	Kuwait	DNF	
	1	Mohammed Al-Khafajai	Iraq	DNS	
	2	Rami Ibrahim Kareem	Iraq	DNS	

Final – 3 February

Rank	Lane	Name	Nationality	Time	Notes
1st place, gold medalist(s)	6	Abdulaziz Al-Mandeel	Kuwait	7.71	
2nd place, silver medalist(s)	5	Zeng Jianhang	China	7.74	
3rd place, bronze medalist(s)	8	Hideki Omuro	Japan	7.81	PB
4	4	Cheung Wang Fung	Hong Kong	7.87	
5	2	Milad Sayar	Iran	7.88	
6	1	Chan Chung Wang	Hong Kong	7.95	
7	3	Vyacheslav Zems	Kazakhstan	7.96	
8	7	Zhang Honglin	China	7.98	

=== 4 × 400 meters relay ===
3 February

Rank	Nation	Athletes	Time	Notes
1st place, gold medalist(s)	Qatar	Abderrahaman Samba, Mohamed Nasir Abbas, Mohamed El Nour, Abdalelah Haroun	3:10.08	
2nd place, silver medalist(s)	Kazakhstan	Andrey Sokolov, Sergey Zaykov, Dmitriy Koblov, Mikhail Litvin	3:11.68	NR
3rd place, bronze medalist(s)	Iran	Ali Khadivar, Reza Kashef, Mehdi Rahimi, Sajad Hashemi Ahangari	3:11.74	NR
4	Kuwait	?, Youssef Karam Taher, Ebrahim Al-Zofairi, ?	3:14.75	
5	Pakistan	?, ?, ?, ?	3:16.53	
6	Lebanon	Mahmoud El Daou, Noureddin Hadid, Christophe Boulos, Ahmad Hazer	3:38.65	

=== High jump ===
1 February

Rank	Name	Nationality	Result	Notes
1st place, gold medalist(s)	Mutaz Essa Barshim	Qatar	2.38	CR
2nd place, silver medalist(s)	Keivan Ghanbarzadeh	Iran	2.15	
3rd place, bronze medalist(s)	Mahamat Alamine Hamdi	Qatar	2.15	
4	Dmitriy Melsitov	Uzbekistan	2.15	
5	Siavash Salimi	Iran	2.10	
5	Guo Jinqi	China	2.10	
7	Hong To Yeung	Hong Kong	2.05	
8	Roman Loshkaryev	Kazakhstan	2.00	
9	Wang Hao	China	1.95	
	Utomyshov	Turkmenistan	DNS	
	Hussein Al-Ibraheemi	Iraq	DNS	
	Al-Mandeel	Kuwait	DNS	
	Mohammadreza Vazifehdoost	Iran	DNS	

=== Pole vault ===
2 February

Rank	Name	Nationality	Result	Notes
1st place, gold medalist(s)	Nikita Filippov	Kazakhstan	5.20	
2nd place, silver medalist(s)	Mohammad Baniadam	Iran	5.20	
3rd place, bronze medalist(s)	Ali Al-Sabaghah	Kuwait	5.00	
4	Daniel Polyanskiy	Kazakhstan	5.00	
5	Hossain Fallah	Iran	4.00	
	Ali Mohsin Al-Ateej	Iraq	DNS	

=== Long jump ===
Heats – 1 February

Rank	Name	Nationality	Result	Notes
1	Shi Yuhao	China	7.68	Q
2	Lin Chia-hao	Chinese Taipei	7.59	Q
3	Janaka Prasad	Sri Lanka	7.55	Q
4	Nguyễn Tiến Trọng	Vietnam	7.50	Q
4	M. Sreeshankar	India	7.50	Q
6	Natsuki Yamakawa	Japan	7.47	Q
7	Lin Hung-min	Chinese Taipei	7.33	q
8	Mohammad Arzandeh	Iran	7.31	q
9	Mohammad Ghaedzadeh	Iran	7.15	q
10	Sullia Ebrahim Samsheer	India	7.13	q
11	Lau Kin Hei	Hong Kong	7.01	q
12	Alireza Khaledi	Iran	6.94	q
13	Wong Ka Chun	Macau	6.90	
14	Javokhir Noriev	Uzbekistan	6.61	
	Mohamed Ali Amin	Bangladesh	DNS	
	Barea Amer Al-Bayati	Iraq	DNS	
	Saleh Abdelaziz Al-Haddad	Kuwait	DNS	
	Huang	China	DNS	
	Abdah	Iraq	DNS	

Final – 3 February

Rank	Name	Nationality	Result	Notes
1st place, gold medalist(s)	Shi Yuhao	China	8.16	WL
2nd place, silver medalist(s)	Lin Hung-min	Chinese Taipei	7.72	
3rd place, bronze medalist(s)	Janaka Prasad	Sri Lanka	7.67	
4	M. Sreeshankar	India	7.60	
5	Natsuki Yamakawa	Japan	7.55	
6	Mohammad Ghaedzadeh	Iran	7.48	
7	Lin Chia-hao	Chinese Taipei	7.41	
8	Sullia Ebrahim Samsheer	India	7.36	
9	Mohammad Arzandeh	Iran	7.27	
10	Lau Kin Hei	Hong Kong	7.22	
11	Alireza Khaledi	Iran	7.11	
	Nguyễn Tiến Trọng	Vietnam	DNS	

=== Triple jump ===
3 February

Rank	Name	Nationality	Result	Notes
1st place, gold medalist(s)	Khaled Al-Subaie	Kuwait	16.26	NR
2nd place, silver medalist(s)	Kamalraj Kanagaraj	India	16.23	
3rd place, bronze medalist(s)	Vahid Seddigh	Iran	15.96	
4	Hadi Madahi	Iran	14.90	
5	Javokhir Noriev	Uzbekistan	14.30	
	Aprinder Sing	India	DNS	

=== Shot put ===
2 February

Rank	Name	Nationality	Result	Notes
1st place, gold medalist(s)	Ali Samari	Iran	19.42	
2nd place, silver medalist(s)	Tejinder Pal Singh	India	19.18	
3rd place, bronze medalist(s)	Wu Jiaxing	China	18.81	
4	Shahin Mehrdelan	Iran	18.68	
5	Ivan Ivanov	Kazakhstan	18.31	
6	Grigoriy Kamulya	Uzbekistan	18.05	
7	Om Praksh Singh	India	18.02	
8	Hayato Yamamoto	Japan	17.74	
9	Sergey Dementev	Uzbekistan	17.53	
10	Shahin Jafari	Iran	17.50	
11	Daichi Nakamura	Japan	16.41	
12	Hossain Imtiaz	Bangladesh	12.83	NR
	Mohammad Mashari	Kuwait	NM	
	Maksat Mämmedow	Turkmenistan	DNS	

=== Heptathlon ===
1–2 February

The highest mark recorded in each event is highlighted in yellow

Rank	Athlete	Nationality	60m	LJ	SP	HJ	60m H	PV	1000m	Points	Notes
1st place, gold medalist(s)	Majed Radhi Al-Sayed	Kuwait	7.23	7.00	12.08	1.88	8.64	4.40	2:51.78	5228	NR
2nd place, silver medalist(s)	Milad Miri	Iran	7.33	6.40	11.13	2.00	8.92	3.70	2:52.22	4842	
3rd place, bronze medalist(s)	Ali Mohebbi	Iran	7.34	6.05	12.81	1.76	8.95	4.30	3:00.58	4728	
4	Mohammad Motamednia	Iran	7.97	5.27	10.46	1.73	9.89	3.70	3:24.81	3624	
5	Hojjat Kazemi	Afghanistan	8.49	4.60	6.91	NM	12.23	NM	2:54.37	1955	

== Women's results ==
=== 60 meters ===
Heats – 1 February

Rank	Heat	Name	Nationality	Time	Notes
1	1	Liang Xiaojing	China	7.29	Q
2	1	Rima Kashafutdinova	Kazakhstan	7.43	Q
3	1	Lam On Ki	Hong Kong	7.50	q
4	1	Hamideh Esmaiel Nejad	Iran	7.71	
5	1	Olena Hudaybergenova	Turkmenistan	8.41	
	1	Dana Hussain	Iraq	DNS	
1	2	Farzaneh Fasihi	Iran	7.46	Q
2	2	Valentina Meredova	Turkmenistan	7.47	Q
3	2	Anna Bulanova	Kyrgyzstan	7.61	q
4	2	Aziza Sbaity	Lebanon	7.69	
5	2	Chou Chi Lan	Macau	8.19	
	2	Dutee Chand	India	DNS	
	3	Viktoriya Zyabkina	Kazakhstan	?.??	Q
	3	Faezeh Nesaei	Iran	?.??	Q
	3	Zaidatul Husniah Zulkifli	Malaysia	?.??	
	3	Kamia Yousufi	Afghanistan	?.??	
	3	Nigina Sharipova	Uzbekistan	?.??	
	3	Chawan Bahaalddin Hasan	Iraq	?.??	

Final – 2 February

Rank	Lane	Name	Nationality	Time	Notes
1st place, gold medalist(s)	4	Liang Xiaojing	China	7.20	CR
2nd place, silver medalist(s)	6	Viktoriya Zyabkina	Kazakhstan	7.39	
3rd place, bronze medalist(s)	3	Farzaneh Fasihi	Iran	7.44	
4	2	Lam On Ki	Hong Kong	7.46	
5	5	Rima Kashafutdinova	Kazakhstan	7.50	
6	8	Valentina Meredova	Turkmenistan	7.54	
7	7	Faezeh Nesaei	Iran	7.56	
8	1	Anna Bulanova	Kyrgyzstan	7.57	

=== 400 meters ===
Heats – 1 February

Rank	Heat	Name	Nationality	Time	Notes
1	1	Svetlana Golendova	Kazakhstan	54.93	Q
2	1	Upamalika Walawwe	Sri Lanka	55.36	Q
3	2	Elina Mikhina	Kazakhstan	56.12	Q
4	2	Nigina Sharipova	Uzbekistan	57.53	Q
5	2	Maryam Mohebbi	Iran	57.75	q
6	1	Elham Kakoli	Iran	58.24	q
7	2	Mariya Rozymova	Turkmenistan	59.44	
8	1	Sumi Akter	Bangladesh	1:01.69	
	2	Dana Hussain	Iraq	DNS	

Final – 2 February

Rank	Name	Nationality	Time	Notes
1st place, gold medalist(s)	Svetlana Golendova	Kazakhstan	53.28	
2nd place, silver medalist(s)	Elina Mikhina	Kazakhstan	53.49	
3rd place, bronze medalist(s)	Upamalika Walawwe	Sri Lanka	54.90	
4	Nigina Sharipova	Uzbekistan	56.29	
5	Elham Kakoli	Iran	56.74	
6	Maryam Mohebbi	Iran	57.71	

=== 800 meters ===
1 February

Rank	Name	Nationality	Time	Notes
1st place, gold medalist(s)	Wang Chunyu	China	2:09.30	
2nd place, silver medalist(s)	Hu Zhiying	China	2:10.81	
3rd place, bronze medalist(s)	Nimali Liyanarachchi	Sri Lanka	2:10.83	
4	Gayanthika Artigala	Sri Lanka	2:11.20	
5	Haniye Samari	Iran	2:16.03	
6	Sajadeh Fani	Iran	2:17.79	
7	Taktam Dastarbandan	Iran	2:22.08	
8	Sumi Akter	Bangladesh	2:42.23	
	Amal Al-Roumi	Kuwait	DNS	

=== 1500 meters ===
3 February

Rank	Name	Nationality	Time	Notes
1st place, gold medalist(s)	Gayanthika Artigala	Sri Lanka	4:26.83	
2nd place, silver medalist(s)	Tatyana Neroznak	Kazakhstan	4:28.20	
3rd place, bronze medalist(s)	Nguyễn Thị Oanh	Vietnam	4:28.87	
4	Gulshanoi Satarova	Kyrgyzstan	4:37.13	
5	Parisa Arab	Iran	4:47.67	
6	Narges Khani	Iran	4:50.36	
	Haniye Samari	Iran	DNF	
	Amal Al-Roumi	Kuwait	DNS	

=== 3000 meters ===
1 February

Rank	Name	Nationality	Time	Notes
1st place, gold medalist(s)	Tatyana Neroznak	Kazakhstan	9:33.65	
2nd place, silver medalist(s)	Gulshanoi Satarova	Kyrgyzstan	9:48.03	
3rd place, bronze medalist(s)	Nguyễn Thị Oanh	Vietnam	9:48.48	
4	Chikako Mori	Japan	9:59.83	
5	Parisa Arab	Iran	10:20.82	
6	Samira Zamani	Iran	10:43.67	
7	Afsaneh Faridi	Iran	10:59.81	
	Taibah Al-Nouri	Kuwait	DNS	
	Sanjivani Baburao Jadhav	India	DNS	
	Lulwah Al-Asker	Kuwait	DNS	

=== 60 meters hurdles ===
2 February

Rank	Lane	Name	Nationality	Time	Notes
1st place, gold medalist(s)	3	Aigerim Shynazbekova	Kazakhstan	8.32	
2nd place, silver medalist(s)	4	Elnaz Kompani	Iran	8.46	NR
3rd place, bronze medalist(s)	2	Sara Nadafi	Iran	8.87	
4	6	Jamileh Ssifi	Iran	9.48	
	5	Dlsoz Obaid Najim	Iraq	DNS	

=== 4 × 400 meters relay ===
3 February

Rank	Nation	Athletes	Time	Notes
1st place, gold medalist(s)	Kazakhstan	Svetlana Golendova, Adelina Akhmetova, Viktoriya Zyabkina, Elina Mikhina	3:41.67	
2nd place, silver medalist(s)	Iran	Maryam Mohebbi, Faezeh Nesaei, Elham Kakoli, Zahra Moradi	3:51.39	NR
3rd place, bronze medalist(s)	Turkmenistan	Mariya Rozymova, ?, ?, ?	3:58.81	
4	Uzbekistan		4:19.33	
	Iraq		DNS	

=== High jump ===
1 February

Rank	Name	Nationality	Result	Notes
1st place, gold medalist(s)	Nadiya Dusanova	Uzbekistan	1.87	
2nd place, silver medalist(s)	Sepideh Tavakoli	Iran	1.80	
3rd place, bronze medalist(s)	Nadezhda Dubovitskaya	Kazakhstan	1.80	
4	Safina Sadullayeva	Uzbekistan	1.75	
5	Zhang Luyu	China	1.75	
6	Deng Siyi	China	1.75	
7	Yeung Man Wai	Hong Kong	1.70	
8	Mahsa Kargar	Iran	1.65	
9	Ailin Babaki	Iran	1.65	
	Maryam Abdulhameem Abdulelah	Iraq	DNS	

=== Pole vault ===
2 February

Rank	Name	Nationality	Result	Notes
1st place, gold medalist(s)	Anastasiya Yermakova	Kazakhstan	3.70	
2nd place, silver medalist(s)	Mahsa Mirzatabibi	Iran	3.50	
3rd place, bronze medalist(s)	Sara Karimi	Iran	2.40	
3rd place, bronze medalist(s)	Niloofar Fashkhorani	Iran	2.40	

=== Long jump ===
3 February

Rank	Name	Nationality	Result	Notes
1st place, gold medalist(s)	Bùi Thị Thu Thảo	Vietnam	6.20	
2nd place, silver medalist(s)	Nayana James	India	6.08	
3rd place, bronze medalist(s)	Neena Varakil	India	6.06	
4	Irina Ektova	Kazakhstan	5.95	
5	Roksana Khudoyarova	Uzbekistan	5.73	
6	Christel El Saneh	Lebanon	5.31	
7	Sou I Man	Macau	5.16	
8	Fatemeh Jamaati	Iran	5.14	
	Kimia Poorkhalkhali	Iran	NM	
	Chawan Bahaalddin Hasan	Iraq	DNS	
	Shahad Qasim Al-Saedi	Iraq	DNS	

=== Triple jump ===
1 February

Rank	Name	Nationality	Result	Notes
1st place, gold medalist(s)	Irina Ektova	Kazakhstan	13.79	
2nd place, silver medalist(s)	N.V. Sheena	India	13.37	
3rd place, bronze medalist(s)	Bùi Thị Thu Thảo	Vietnam	13.22	
4	Mariya Ovchinnikova	Kazakhstan	13.00	
5	Kaede Miyasaka	Japan	12.80	
6	Hashini Mudiyanselage	Sri Lanka	12.77	
7	Roksana Khudoyarova	Uzbekistan	12.69	
8	Soraya Gheligniazi	Iran	11.38	
	Maryam Kazemi	Iran	NM	
	Samaneh Kouhkan	Iran	NM	
	Shahad Qasim Al-Saedi	Iraq	DNS	

=== Shot put ===
2 February

Rank	Name	Nationality	Result	Notes
1st place, gold medalist(s)	Elena Smolyanova	Uzbekistan	15.54	
2nd place, silver medalist(s)	Maryam Norouzi	Iran	12.47	
3rd place, bronze medalist(s)	Sana Dadres	Iran	11.46	
4	Negin Mirzaei	Iran	10.36	

=== Pentathlon ===
3 February

The highest mark recorded in each event is highlighted in yellow

Rank	Athlete	Nationality	60m H	HJ	SP	LJ	800m	Points	Notes
1st place, gold medalist(s)	Sepideh Tavakoli	Iran	9.00	1.83	12.41	5.61	2:28.31	4038	NR
2nd place, silver medalist(s)	Aleksandra Yurkevskaya	Uzbekistan	8.92	1.71	11.25	5.63	2:28.31	3858	
3rd place, bronze medalist(s)	Irina Velihanova	Turkmenistan	9.10	1.65	11.74	5.19	2:22.51	3730	
4	Nadezhda Kirnos	Kazakhstan	8.93	1.53	10.87	5.81	2:23.99	3723	
5	Samira Khojasteh	Iran	9.44	1.50	9.80	5.13	2:29.90	3246	
6	Elaheh Seifi	Iran	9.51	NM	8.35	5.05	2:27.86	2521	
