= 2019 Asian Athletics Championships – Women's 100 metres =

Women's 100 metres at the 2019 Asian Athletics Championships
- Venue: Khalifa International Stadium
- Location: Doha, Qatar
- Dates: 21 April (heats); 22 April (semi-finals & final)
- Competitors: 27 from 20 nations
- Winning time: 11.17 CR

Medalists
gold medal	Olga Safronova	Kazakhstan
silver medal	Liang Xiaojing	China
bronze medal	Wei Yongli	China

The women's 100 metres at the 2019 Asian Athletics Championships was held on 21 and 22 April.

== Records ==
Records before the 2019 Asian Athletics Championships
Record	Athlete (nation)	Time (s)	Location	Date
World record	Florence Griffith Joyner (USA)	10.49	Indianapolis, United States	16 July 1988
Asian record	Li Xuemei (CHN)	10.79	Shanghai, China	18 August 1997
Championship record	Lyubov Perepelova (UZB)	11.24	Manila, Philippines	20 September 2003
World leading	Gabby Thomas (USA)	11.10	Columbia, United States	13 April 2019
Asian leading	Liang Xiaojing (CHN)	11.26	Gainesville, United States	29 March 2019

== Results ==
=== Heats ===
Qualification rule: First 4 in each heat (Q) and the next 4 fastest (q) qualified for the semifinals.

Wind:
Heat 1: -0.3 m/s, Heat 2: +0.4 m/, Heat 3: -0.2 m/s, Heat 4: -0.1 m/s

Rank	Heat	Name	Nationality	Time	Notes
1	4	Dutee Chand	India	11.28	Q, NR
2	2	Olga Safronova	Kazakhstan	11.30	Q
3	2	Wei Yongli	China	11.36	Q, SB
4	3	Liang Xiaojing	China	11.37	Q
5	1	Nigina Sharipova	Uzbekistan	11.47	Q
6	1	Iman Essa Jassim	Bahrain	11.50	Q, SB
7	4	Anna Bulanova	Kyrgyzstan	11.55	Q, SB
8	2	Veronica Shanti Pereira	Singapore	11.58	Q, NR
9	2	Lam On Ki	Hong Kong	11.62	q, NR
10	1	Lê Tú Chinh	Vietnam	11.67	Q
11	3	Kristina Marie Knott	Philippines	11.70	Q
12	3	Supawan Thipat	Thailand	11.73	Q, PB
13	1	Aziza Sbaity	Lebanon	11.78	q, SB
14	1	On-Uma Chattha	Thailand	11.79	q, SB
15	4	Hajar Al-Khaldi	Bahrain	11.81	Q, SB
16	1	Chisato Fukushima	Japan	11.92	q
17	3	Hu Chia-chen	Chinese Taipei	11.94	
18	4	Rima Kashafutdinova	Kazakhstan	11.95	
19	1	Asra Sahibe	Pakistan	12.04	
20	3	Valentina Meredova	Turkmenistan	12.06	
21	2	Mudhawi Al-Shammari	Kuwait	12.34	NR
22	3	Ola Baajour	Lebanon	12.39	
24	4	Silina Phay Aphay	Laos	12.52	
25	4	Shirin Akter	Bangladesh	12.72	
26	2	Shohagi Akter	Bangladesh	12.78	
27	3	Dima Daralshikh	Palestine	13.60	

=== Semifinals ===
Qualification rule: First 3 in each heat (Q) and the next 2 fastest (q) qualified for the final.

Wind:
Heat 1: +1.3 m/s, Heat 2: +1.4 m/s

Rank	Heat	Name	Nationality	Time	Notes
1	1	Olga Safronova	Kazakhstan	11.21	Q, CR, SB
2	1	Liang Xiaojing	China	11.26	Q, =PB
2	2	Dutee Chand	India	11.26	Q, NR
4	1	Iman Essa Jassim	Bahrain	11.41	Q, SB
5	2	Wei Yongli	China	11.47	Q
6	2	Nigina Sharipova	Uzbekistan	11.49	Q
7	1	Anna Bulanova	Kyrgyzstan	11.58	q
8	1	Supawan Thipat	Thailand	11.66	q, PB
9	2	Lam On Ki	Hong Kong	11.69	
10	1	Lê Tú Chinh	Vietnam	11.69	
11	2	Veronica Shanti Pereira	Singapore	11.71	
12	1	Aziza Sbaity	Lebanon	11.73	NR
13	2	Kristina Marie Knott	Philippines	11.77	
14	2	Hajar Al-Khaldi	Bahrain	11.82	
15	2	On-Uma Chattha	Thailand	11.85	
16	1	Chisato Fukushima	Japan	12.02	

=== Final ===
Wind: +1.8 m/s

Rank	Lane	Name	Nationality	Time	Notes
1st place, gold medalist(s)	7	Olga Safronova	Kazakhstan	11.17	CR, SB
2nd place, silver medalist(s)	4	Liang Xiaojing	China	11.28	
3rd place, bronze medalist(s)	6	Wei Yongli	China	11.37	
4	9	Nigina Sharipova	Uzbekistan	11.41	SB
5	5	Dutee Chand	India	11.44	
6	8	Iman Essa Jassim	Bahrain	11.55	
7	2	Anna Bulanova	Kyrgyzstan	11.61	
8	3	Supawan Thipat	Thailand	11.64	PB
