= 2017 Asian Athletics Championships – Women's 4 × 100 metres relay =

The women's 4 × 100 metres relay at the 2017 Asian Athletics Championships was held on 8 July.

== Results ==
Before this competition, the world and championship records in this event were as follows

Rank	Lane	Team	Name	Time	Notes
1st place, gold medalist(s)	1	Kazakhstan	Rima Kashafutdinova, Viktoriya Zyabkina, Merjen Ishanguliyeva, Olga Safronova	43.53	
2nd place, silver medalist(s)	4	China	Sun Fengyan, Kong Lingwei, Lin Huijun, Feng Lulu	44.50	
3rd place, bronze medalist(s)	5	India	Merlin Joseph, Himashree Roy, Srabani Nanda, Dutee Chand	44.57	
4	7	Thailand	On-Uma Chattha, Kanyarat Pakdee, Tassaporn Wannakit, Supawan Thipat	44.74	
5	2	Malaysia	Nurul Faizah Asma, Siti Fatima, Komalam Shally, Zaidatul Husniah	45.18	NR
6	3	Japan	Miyu Maeyama, Mizuki Nakamura, Seika Aoyama, Kaho Nishio	45.40	
7	8	Singapore	Wendy Enn, Shanti Pereira, Kugapriya Chandran, Nur Izlyn Zaini	45.97	
8	6	Bangladesh	Susmita Ghosh, Jesmin Akter, Sumi Akter, Shohagi Akter	50.39	

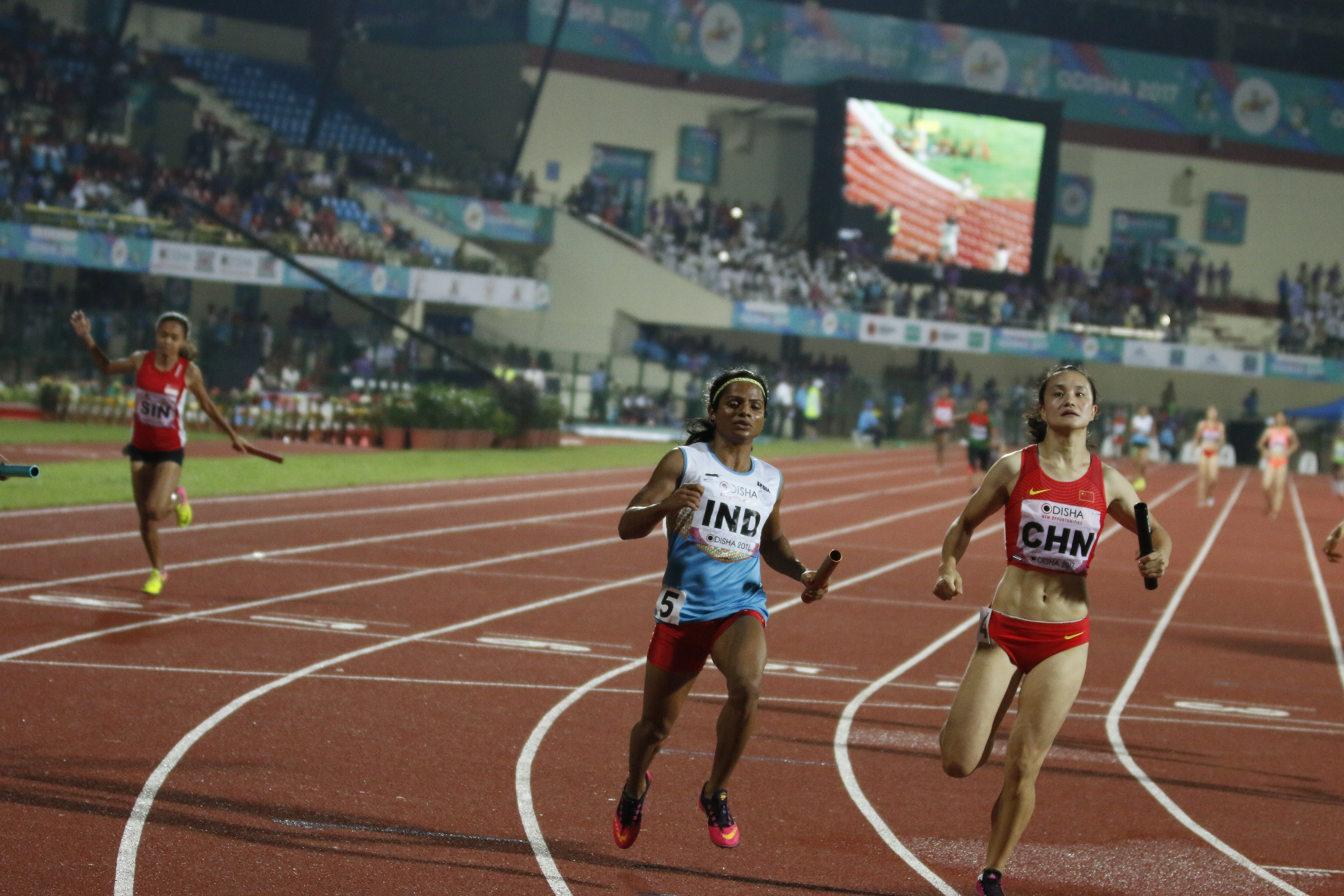
India (bronze) and China (silver) after the finish
