= Athletics at the 2018 Asian Games – Women's 200 metres =

Women's 200 metres at the 2018 Asian Games
- Venue: Gelora Bung Karno Stadium
- Date: 28–29 August 2018
- Competitors: 30 from 21 nations

Medalists
gold medal	Edidiong Odiong	Bahrain
silver medal	Dutee Chand	India
bronze medal	Wei Yongli	China

The women's 200 metres competition at the 2018 Asian Games took place on 28 and 29 August 2018 at the Gelora Bung Karno Stadium.

== Schedule ==
All times are Western Indonesia Time (UTC+07:00)

Date	Time	Event
Tuesday, 28 August 2018	09:45	Round 1
Tuesday, 28 August 2018	18:50	Semifinals
Wednesday, 29 August 2018	18:45	Final

== Records ==
Prior to this competition, the existing world, Asian and Games records were as follows.

World Record	Florence Griffith Joyner (USA)	21.34	Seoul, South Korea	29 September 1988
Asian Record	Li Xuemei (CHN)	22.01	Shanghai, China	22 October 1997
Games Record	Damayanthi Dharsha (SRI)	22.48	Bangkok, Thailand	18 December 1998

== Results ==
Legend

- DSQ — Disqualified

=== Round 1 ===
- Qualification: First 3 in each heat (Q) and the next 4 fastest (q) advance to the semifinals.

==== Heat 1 ====
- Wind: +0.4 m/s

Rank	Athlete	Time	Notes
1	Wei Yongli (CHN)	24.20	Q
2	Edidiong Odiong (BRN)	24.44	Q
3	Lee Min-jung (KOR)	24.55	Q
4	Loi Im Lan (MAC)	24.73	
5	Elham Kakoli (IRI)	25.12	
6	Silina Phaaphay (LAO)	26.06	
7	Yara Abuljadayel (KSA)	30.18	

==== Heat 2 ====
- Wind: −0.3 m/s

Rank	Athlete	Time	Notes
1	Kong Lingwei (CHN)	23.41	Q
2	Olga Safronova (KAZ)	23.44	Q
3	Kristina Knott (PHI)	23.45	Q
4	Hima Das (IND)	23.47	q
5	Anna Bulanova (KGZ)	24.02	q
6	Aziza Sbaity (LBN)	24.55	
7	Chan Pui Kei (HKG)	24.92	
8	Aishath Himna Hassan (MDV)	26.73	

==== Heat 3 ====
- Wind: −0.1 m/s

Rank	Athlete	Time	Notes
1	Nigina Sharipova (UZB)	23.31	Q
2	Hajar Al-Khaldi (BRN)	23.41	Q
3	Kim Min-ji (KOR)	23.88	Q
4	Lê Tú Chinh (VIE)	24.09	q
5	Shanti Pereira (SGP)	24.23	q
6	Lusiana Satriani (INA)	25.03	
—	Viktoriya Zyabkina (KAZ)	DSQ	

==== Heat 4 ====
- Wind: −0.1 m/s

Rank	Athlete	Time	Notes
1	Dutee Chand (IND)	23.37	Q
2	Quách Thị Lan (VIE)	23.72	Q
3	Rumeshika Rathnayake (SRI)	23.79	Q
4	Dana Hussein (IRQ)	24.31	
5	Alvin Tehupeiory (INA)	24.36	
6	Poon Hang Wai (HKG)	25.59	
7	Hanin Thabit (YEM)	28.51	
8	Dana Al-Shehri (KSA)	28.99	

=== Semifinals ===
- Qualification: First 3 in each heat (Q) and the next 2 fastest (q) advance to the final.

==== Heat 1 ====
- Wind: +0.1 m/s

Rank	Athlete	Time	Notes
1	Dutee Chand (IND)	23.00	Q
2	Edidiong Odiong (BRN)	23.01	Q
3	Kong Lingwei (CHN)	23.32	Q
4	Quách Thị Lan (VIE)	23.76	q
5	Kim Min-ji (KOR)	23.86	
6	Rumeshika Rathnayake (SRI)	24.05	
7	Anna Bulanova (KGZ)	24.16	
8	Shanti Pereira (SGP)	24.33	

==== Heat 2 ====
- Wind: +0.1 m/s

Rank	Athlete	Time	Notes
1	Olga Safronova (KAZ)	23.41	Q
2	Wei Yongli (CHN)	23.45	Q
3	Nigina Sharipova (UZB)	23.45	Q
4	Kristina Knott (PHI)	23.65	q
5	Lê Tú Chinh (VIE)	24.13	
6	Lee Min-jung (KOR)	24.36	
—	Hajar Al-Khaldi (BRN)	DSQ	
—	Hima Das (IND)	DSQ	

=== Final ===
- Wind: −0.7 m/s

Rank	Athlete	Time	Notes
1st place, gold medalist(s)	Edidiong Odiong (BRN)	22.96	
2nd place, silver medalist(s)	Dutee Chand (IND)	23.20	
3rd place, bronze medalist(s)	Wei Yongli (CHN)	23.27	
4	Nigina Sharipova (UZB)	23.32	
5	Olga Safronova (KAZ)	23.43	
6	Kristina Knott (PHI)	23.51	
6	Kong Lingwei (CHN)	23.51	
8	Quách Thị Lan (VIE)	23.77	
