= 2015 Asian Athletics Championships – Women's 200 metres =

The women's 200 metres event at the 2015 Asian Athletics Championships was held on the 6 and 7 of June.

== Medalists ==
Gold	Viktoriya Zyabkina; Kazakhstan
Silver	Olga Safronova; Kazakhstan
Bronze	Srabani Nanda; India

== Results ==
=== Heats ===
First 2 in each heat (Q) and the next 2 fastest (q) qualified for the final.

Wind:
Heat 1: -0.8 m/s, Heat 2: -0.4 m/s, Heat 3: -0.4 m/s

Rank	Heat	Name	Nationality	Time	Notes
1	1	Viktoriya Zyabkina	Kazakhstan	23.39	Q
2	3	Olga Safronova	Kazakhstan	23.65	Q
3	1	Srabani Nanda	India	23.71	Q
4	3	Kana Ichikawa	Japan	23.76	Q
5	2	Lin Huijun	China	23.90	Q
6	2	Dana Hussain	Iraq	23.96	Q, NR
7	2	Maryam Toosi	Iran	24.12	q
8	1	Anna Doi	Japan	24.14	q
9	3	Liang Xiaojing	China	24.17	
10	1	Kong Lingwei	China	24.25	
11	3	Hajar Al-Khaldi	Bahrain	24.99	
12	2	Aziza Sbaity	Lebanon	25.02	
13	3	Lê Thị Mộng Tuyền	Vietnam	25.26	
14	1	Chan Pui Kei	Hong Kong	25.33	
15	3	Poon Hang Wai	Hong Kong	25.48	
16	3	Afa Ismail	Maldives	26.27	
17	2	Shirin Akter	Bangladesh	26.78	
18	1	Aminath Nazra	Maldives	27.73	
	2	Alaa Lila	Syria	DQ	R163.3
	1	Diana Agliulina	Uzbekistan	DNF	
	2	Le Tu Chinh	Vietnam	DNS	
	2	Kim Min-ji	South Korea	DNS	

=== Final ===
Wind: +0.4 m/s

Rank	Lane	Name	Nationality	Result	Notes
1st place, gold medalist(s)	3	Viktoriya Zyabkina	Kazakhstan	23.09	
2nd place, silver medalist(s)	5	Olga Safronova	Kazakhstan	23.46	
3rd place, bronze medalist(s)	6	Srabani Nanda	India	23.54	
4	4	Lin Huijun	China	23.73	
5	8	Kana Ichikawa	Japan	23.74	
6	2	Maryam Toosi	Iran	23.95	
7	7	Dana Hussain	Iraq	24.04	
8	1	Anna Doi	Japan	24.36	
