= 2019 Asian Athletics Championships – Women's 200 metres =

Women's 200 metres at the 2019 Asian Athletics Championships
- Venue: Khalifa International Stadium
- Location: Doha, Qatar
- Dates: 23 April (heats & semi-finals); 24 April (final)
- Competitors: 23 from 18 nations
- Winning time: 22.74 CR

Medalists
gold medal	Salwa Eid Naser	Bahrain
silver medal	Olga Safronova	Kazakhstan
bronze medal	Dutee Chand	India

The women's 200 metres event at the 2019 Asian Athletics Championships was held on 23 and 24 April.

== Records ==
Records before the 2019 Asian Athletics Championships
Record	Athlete (nation)	Time (s)	Location	Date
World record	Florence Griffith Joyner (USA)	21.34	Seoul, South Korea	28 September 1988
Asian record	Li Xuemei (CHN)	22.01	Shanghai, China	22 October 1997
Championship record	Damayanthi Dharsha (SRI)	22.84	Jakarta, Indonesia	31 August 2000
World leading	Anavia Battle (USA)	22.54	Gainesville, United States	29 March 2019
Asian leading	Dutee Chand (IND)	23.35	Patiala, India	16 March 2019

== Results ==
=== Heats ===
Qualification rule: First 2 in each heat (Q) and the next 2 fastest (q) qualified for the final.

Wind:
Heat 1: +1.0 m/s, Heat 2: +0.6 m/s, Heat 3: +2.3 m/s

Rank	Heat	Name	Nationality	Time	Notes
1	2	Salwa Eid Naser	Bahrain	22.84	Q, =CR
2	2	Olga Safronova	Kazakhstan	22.98	Q, SB
3	3	Dutee Chand	India	23.33	Q
4	2	Nigina Sharipova	Uzbekistan	23.43	q, SB
5	1	Ge Manqi	China	23.46	Q, SB
6	3	Kong Lingwei	China	23.51	Q
7	1	Edidiong Odiong	Bahrain	23.53	Q, SB
8	2	Anna Bulanova	Kyrgyzstan	23.55	q, PB
9	3	Kristina Marie Knott	Philippines	23.73	
10	1	Veronica Shanti Pereira	Singapore	23.96	
11	3	Gulsumbi Sharifova	Tajikistan	23.99	
12	1	Danah Hussein Al-Khafaji	Iraq	24.02	SB
13	3	Lê Tú Chinh	Vietnam	24.06	
14	1	Miku Yamada	Japan	24.09	
15	2	Aziza Sbaity	Lebanon	24.25	PB
16	3	Naoka Miyake	Japan	24.36	
17	1	Asra Sahibe	Pakistan	24.71	PB
18	2	Mudhawi Al-Shammari	Kuwait	24.99	NR
19	2	Nguyễn Thị Oanh	Vietnam	25.07	SB
20	1	Poon Hang Wai	Hong Kong	25.12	SB
21	3	Ola Baajour	Lebanon	25.96	
22	3	Shohagi Akter	Bangladesh	26.21	
23	1	Hanin Thabit	Yemen	28.31	PB
	2	Dima Daralshikh	Palestine	DNS	

=== Final ===
Wind: +1.2 m/s

Rank	Lane	Name	Nationality	Time	Notes
1st place, gold medalist(s)	4	Salwa Eid Naser	Bahrain	22.74	CR, PB
2nd place, silver medalist(s)	5	Olga Safronova	Kazakhstan	22.87	SB
3rd place, bronze medalist(s)	7	Dutee Chand	India	23.24	SB
4	8	Edidiong Odiong	Bahrain	23.24	SB
5	2	Nigina Sharipova	Uzbekistan	23.29	SB
6	6	Ge Manqi	China	23.34	SB
7	9	Kong Lingwei	China	23.42	
8	3	Anna Bulanova	Kyrgyzstan	23.70	
