= Athletics at the 2019 Summer Universiade – Women's 100 metres =

The women's 100 metres event at the 2019 Summer Universiade was held on 8 and 9 July at the Stadio San Paolo in Naples.

== Medalists ==
Gold	Silver	Bronze
Dutee Chand; India	Ajla Del Ponte; Switzerland	Lisa-Marie Kwayie; Germany

== Results ==
=== Preliminaries ===
Qualification: First 4 in each heat (Q) and next 3 fastest (q) qualified for the heats.

Wind:
Heat 1: -0.4 m/s, Heat 2: -1.4 m/s

Rank	Heat	Name	Nationality	Time	Notes
1	2	Latifa Ali	Ghana	11.93	Q, PB
2	1	Evija Šefere	Latvia	12.06	Q, SB
3	1	Jeany Agreta	Indonesia	12.14	Q
4	2	Omaya Muthumala	Sri Lanka	12.28	Q
5	1	Vika Rutar	Slovenia	12.36	Q
6	1	Djamila Zine	Algeria	12.53	Q
7	1	Mariama Mahamadou Nouha	Niger	13.43	q
7	2	Ilona Chiabaut	Monaco	13.43	Q
9	1	Hajer Al-Habsi	Oman	14.03	q
10	1	Patience Chikalira	Malawi	14.80	q
11	2	Munirah Al-Turki	Saudi Arabia	15.94	Q
	1	Feven Zinabu	Ethiopia	DNS	
	2	Damdji Dalila	Comoros	DNS	
	2	Nanah Yansaneh	Sierra Leone	DNS	
	2	Chido Gadzikwa	Zimbabwe	DNS	

=== Heats ===
Qualification: First 2 in each heat (Q) and next 8 fastest (q) qualified for the semifinals.

Wind:
Heat 1: -0.5 m/s, Heat 2: -0.2 m/s, Heat 3: +0.4 m/s, Heat 4: -0.9 m/s, Heat 5: +0.1 m/s, Heat 6: +0.1 m/s, Heat 7: -0.5 m/s, Heat 8: +0.3 m/s

Rank	Heat	Name	Nationality	Time	Notes
1	8	Basant Abdelsalam	Egypt	11.45	Q
2	3	Salome Kora	Switzerland	11.46	Q
3	6	Krystsina Tsimanouskaya	Belarus	11.46	Q
4	5	Lisa-Marie Kwayie	Germany	11.47	Q
5	7	Dutee Chand	India	11.48	Q
6	6	Zoe Hobbs	New Zealand	11.52	Q
7	4	Vitoria Cristina Rosa	Brazil	11.52	Q
8	3	Olivia Fotopoulou	Cyprus	11.54	Q
9	5	Mizgin Ay	Turkey	11.56	Q, SB
10	2	Tamzin Thomas	South Africa	11.56	Q
11	3	Sade McCreath-Tardiel	Canada	11.58	q
12	1	Stella Akakpo	France	11.60	Q
13	3	Celeste Mucci	Australia	11.64	q
14	1	Jessica-Bianca Wessolly	Germany	11.66	Q
15	7	Shanti Pereira	Singapore	11.66	Q
16	8	Kamila Ciba	Poland	11.69	Q
17	2	Marcela Pírková	Czech Republic	11.70	Q
18	5	Loungo Matlhaku	Botswana	11.71	q
19	2	Ajla Del Ponte	Switzerland	11.72	q
20	7	Alexandra Toth	Austria	11.74	q
21	8	Anna Keefer	United States	11.75	q
22	1	Anniina Kortetmaa	Finland	11.79	q
23	4	Iza Flores	Mexico	11.81	Q
24	2	María Mercedes Talamante	Mexico	11.81	q
25	1	Zakiyya Hasanova	Azerbaijan	11.85	
26	4	Georgia Hulls	New Zealand	11.87	
27	3	Karolina Deliautaitė	Lithuania	11.87	SB
28	6	Anna Bulanova	Kyrgyzstan	11.88	
29	1	Jacent Nyamahunge	Uganda	11.88	PB
30	3	Supawan Thipat	Thailand	11.92	
31	8	Kanako Yuasa	Japan	11.92	
32	4	Kate Agyemang	Ghana	11.93	
33	2	On-Uma Chattha	Thailand	11.97	
34	6	Agata Forkasiewicz	Poland	11.98	
35	7	Mai Fukuda	Japan	11.99	
36	2	Latifa Ali	Ghana	11.99	
37	5	Evija Šefere	Latvia	12.02	SB
38	3	Dhanalakshmi Sekar	India	12.04	
39	8	Rima Kashafutdinova	Kazakhstan	12.05	
40	1	Hajar Eddaou	Morocco	12.10	
41	6	Loi Im Lan	Macau	12.12	
42	5	Louise Ostergard	Denmark	12.17	
43	7	Reabetswe Moloi	South Africa	12.20	
44	4	Hu Chia-chen	Chinese Taipei	12.21	
45	6	Diana Podoleanu	Moldova	12.22	
46	4	Javiera Cañas	Chile	12.23	
47	7	Malin Kulseth	Norway	12.24	
48	7	Tyas Murtiningsih	Indonesia	12.27	
49	6	Jeany Agreta	Indonesia	12.31	
50	5	Vika Rutar	Slovenia	12.32	
51	4	Djamila Zine	Algeria	12.42	
52	3	María Montt	Chile	12.43	
53	8	Shirin Akter	Bangladesh	12.45	
54	6	Omaya Muthumala	Sri Lanka	12.49	
55	2	Safaa Troubia	Algeria	12.52	
56	5	Lushomo Mukakanga	Zambia	12.66	
57	8	Margaret Apolot	Uganda	12.86	
58	7	Ilona Chiabaut	Monaco	13.46	
59	4	Abigaelle Dalamndji	Central African Republic	13.77	
	1	Irene Bell Bonong	Cameroon	DNS	
	1	Mariama Mahamadou Nouha	Niger	DNS	
	2	Munirah Al-Turki	Saudi Arabia	DNS	
	3	Patience Chikalira	Malawi	DNS	
	8	Hajer Al-Habsi	Oman	DNS	

=== Semifinals ===
Qualification: First 2 in each heat (Q) and next 2 fastest (q) qualified for the final.

Wind:
Heat 1: -0.8 m/s, Heat 2: -0.5 m/s, Heat 3: +0.1 m/s

Rank	Heat	Name	Nationality	Time	Notes
1	3	Ajla Del Ponte	Switzerland	11.41	Q
2	2	Dutee Chand	India	11.41	Q
3	3	Lisa-Marie Kwayie	Germany	11.44	Q
4	1	Basant Abdelsalam	Egypt	11.49	Q
5	1	Vitoria Cristina Rosa	Brazil	11.49	Q
6	3	Krystsina Tsimanouskaya	Belarus	11.50	q
7	3	Zoe Hobbs	New Zealand	11.51	q
8	2	Salome Kora	Switzerland	11.57	Q
9	3	Olivia Fotopoulou	Cyprus	11.59	
10	1	Tamzin Thomas	South Africa	11.62	
11	1	Loungo Matlhaku	Botswana	11.63	
12	2	Sade McCreath-Tardiel	Canada	11.65	
13	2	Stella Akakpo	France	11.72	
14	1	Shanti Pereira	Singapore	11.73	
15	2	Kamila Ciba	Poland	11.74	
16	1	Celeste Mucci	Australia	11.74	
17	2	Mizgin Ay	Turkey	11.75	SB
18	3	Marcela Pírková	Czech Republic	11.79	
19	3	Iza Flores	Mexico	11.79	
20	2	Anniina Kortetmaa	Finland	11.86	
21	2	Alexandra Toth	Austria	11.87	
22	3	Anna Keefer	United States	11.90	
23	1	María Mercedes Talamante	Mexico	11.95	
	1	Jessica-Bianca Wessolly	Germany	DNS	

=== Final ===
Official Video

Wind: 0.0 m/s

Rank	Lane	Name	Nationality	Time	Notes
1st place, gold medalist(s)	4	Dutee Chand	India	11.32	
2nd place, silver medalist(s)	5	Ajla Del Ponte	Switzerland	11.33	
3rd place, bronze medalist(s)	3	Lisa-Marie Kwayie	Germany	11.39	
4	7	Salome Kora	Switzerland	11.39	
5	8	Vitoria Cristina Rosa	Brazil	11.41	
6	1	Krystsina Tsimanouskaya	Belarus	11.44	
7	6	Basant Abdelsalam	Egypt	11.53	
8	2	Zoe Hobbs	New Zealand	11.55	
