= 2017 Asian Athletics Championships – Women's 100 metres =

The women's 100 metres at the 2017 Asian Athletics Championships was held on 6 and 7 July.

== Medalists ==
Gold	Viktoriya Zyabkina; Kazakhstan
Silver	Olga Safronova; Kazakhstan
Bronze	Dutee Chand; India

== Results ==
=== Heats ===
Qualification rule: The first 3 in each heat (Q) and the next 4 fastest (q) qualified for the semifinals.

Wind:
Heat 1: -0.1 m/s, Heat 2: 0.0 m/s, Heat 3: -0.2 m/s, Heat 4: +0.3 m/s

Rank	Heat	Name	Nationality	Time	Notes
1	3	Dutee Chand	India	11.40	Q
2	1	Viktoriya Zyabkina	Kazakhstan	11.50	Q
3	3	Olga Safronova	Kazakhstan	11.55	Q
4	1	Nigina Sharipova	Uzbekistan	11.59	Q
5	2	Zaidatul Husniah	Malaysia	11.79	Q
6	1	Tassaporn Wannakit	Thailand	11.88	Q
6	4	Siti Fatima	Malaysia	11.88	Q
8	2	Mizuki Nakamura	Japan	11.91	Q
9	1	Miyu Maeyama	Japan	11.92	q
10	1	Wendy Enn	Singapore	11.98	q
11	4	Hu Chia-chen	Chinese Taipei	11.99	Q
12	2	On-uma Chattha	Thailand	12.07	Q
13	4	Son Kyeong-mi	South Korea	12.08	Q
14	1	Lam On Ki	Hong Kong	12.10	q
15	4	Aliya Khattab	Jordan	12.42	q
16	2	Shohagi Akter	Bangladesh	12.59	
17	3	Afa Ismail	Maldives	12.80	Q
18	3	Duong Sreypheap	Cambodia	13.02	
19	4	Nasha Nizar	Maldives	13.12	
20	2	Tamara Awada	Lebanon	13.17	
21	2	Loi Im Lan	Macau	13.27	
22	4	Sadia Bromand	Afghanistan	15.51	
	3	Feng Lulu	China	DQ	
	4	Rumeshika Kumari Rathnayake	Sri Lanka	DQ	
	3	Hajar Alkhaldi	Bahrain	DNS	

=== Semifinals ===
Qualification rule: First 3 in each semifinal (Q) and the next 2 fastest (q) qualified for the final.

Wind:
Heat 1: -0.3 m/s, Heat 2: +0.2 m/s

Rank	Heat	Name	Nationality	Time	Notes
1	1	Viktoriya Zyabkina	Kazakhstan	11.49	Q
2	2	Olga Safronova	Kazakhstan	11.52	Q
3	2	Dutee Chand	India	11.56	Q
4	1	Zaidatul Husniah	Malaysia	11.62	Q
5	1	Nigina Sharipova	Uzbekistan	11.78	Q
6	2	Miyu Maeyama	Japan	11.85	Q
7	1	Mizuki Nakamura	Japan	11.88	q
8	2	Siti Fatima	Malaysia	11.92	q
9	2	Hu Chia-chen	Chinese Taipei	12.08	
10	1	Lam On Ki	Hong Kong	12.13	
11	1	Wendy Enn	Singapore	12.14	
12	1	On-uma Chattha	Thailand	12.14	
13	1	Son Kyeong-mi	South Korea	12.30	
14	2	Aliya Khattab	Jordan	12.39	
15	2	Tassaporn Wannakit	Thailand	12.47	
16	2	Afa Ismail	Maldives	12.79	

=== Final ===
Wind: +1.0 m/s

Rank	Lane	Name	Nationality	Time	Notes
1st place, gold medalist(s)	3	Viktoriya Zyabkina	Kazakhstan	11.39	
2nd place, silver medalist(s)	4	Olga Safronova	Kazakhstan	11.45	
3rd place, bronze medalist(s)	5	Dutee Chand	India	11.52	
4	6	Zaidatul Husniah	Malaysia	11.70	
5	7	Nigina Sharipova	Uzbekistan	11.71	
6	1	Siti Fatima	Malaysia	11.87	
7	8	Miyu Maeyama	Japan	11.98	
	2	Mizuki Nakamura	Japan	DQ	
