= Athletics at the 2018 Asian Games – Women's 100 metres =

Women's 100 metres at the 2018 Asian Games
- Venue: Gelora Bung Karno Stadium
- Dates: 25–26 August 2018
- Competitors: 32 from 22 nations

Medalists
gold medal	Edidiong Odiong	Bahrain
silver medal	Dutee Chand	India
bronze medal	Wei Yongli	China

The women's 100 metres event at the 2018 Asian Games was held at the Gelora Bung Karno Stadium, Jakarta, Indonesia on 25–26 August 2018.

== Schedule ==
All times are Western Indonesia Time (UTC+07:00)

Date	Time	Event
Saturday, 25 August 2018	19:30	Round 1
Sunday, 26 August 2018	18:30	Semifinals
Sunday, 26 August 2018	21:10	Final

== Records ==
Prior to this competition, the existing world, Asian and Games records were as follows.

World Record	Florence Griffith Joyner (USA)	10.49	Indianapolis, United States	16 July 1988
Asian Record	Li Xuemei (CHN)	10.79	Shanghai, China	18 October 1997
Games Record	Susanthika Jayasinghe (SRI)	11.15	Busan, South Korea	8 October 2002

== Results ==
Legend

- DNS — Did not start

=== Round 1 ===
- Qualification: First 3 in each heat (Q) and the next 4 fastest (q) advance to the semifinals.

==== Heat 1 ====
- Wind: −1.2 m/s

Rank	Athlete	Time	Notes
1	Edidiong Odiong (BRN)	11.48	Q
2	Liao Yan-jun (TPE)	11.82	Q
3	Lam On Ki (HKG)	11.91	Q
4	Chisato Fukushima (JPN)	11.99	
5	Shanti Pereira (SGP)	12.01	
6	Aziza Sbaity (LBN)	12.02	
7	Duong Sreypheap (CAM)	13.05	
8	Yara Abuljadayel (KSA)	14.47	

==== Heat 2 ====
- Wind: −0.6 m/s

Rank	Athlete	Time	Notes
1	Dutee Chand (IND)	11.38	Q
2	Olga Safronova (KAZ)	11.46	Q
3	Nigina Sharipova (UZB)	11.59	Q
4	Kristina Knott (PHI)	11.74	q
5	Tyas Murtiningsih (INA)	12.05	
6	You Jin (KOR)	12.06	
7	Silina Phaaphay (LAO)	12.95	
—	Dana Hussein (IRQ)	DNS	

==== Heat 3 ====
- Wind: −0.1 m/s

Rank	Athlete	Time	Notes
1	Wei Yongli (CHN)	11.32	Q
2	Hajar Al-Khaldi (BRN)	11.35	Q
3	Zaidatul Husniah Zulkifli (MAS)	11.59	Q
4	Kim Min-ji (KOR)	11.81	q
5	Chan Pui Kei (HKG)	11.97	
6	Lê Thị Mộng Tuyền (VIE)	11.98	
7	Wendy Enn (SGP)	12.00	
8	Kamia Yousufi (AFG)	13.33	

==== Heat 4 ====
- Wind: +0.1 m/s

Rank	Athlete	Time	Notes
1	Liang Xiaojing (CHN)	11.46	Q
2	Viktoriya Zyabkina (KAZ)	11.63	Q
3	Onuma Chattha (THA)	11.69	Q
4	Lê Tú Chinh (VIE)	11.74	q
5	Kana Ichikawa (JPN)	11.94	q
6	Loi Im Lan (MAC)	11.96	
7	Yuliana (INA)	12.01	
8	Chen Wan-mei (TPE)	12.08	

=== Semifinals ===
- Qualification: First 3 in each heat (Q) and the next 2 fastest (q) advance to the final.

==== Heat 1 ====
- Wind: −0.5 m/s

Rank	Athlete	Time	Notes
1	Olga Safronova (KAZ)	11.42	Q
2	Hajar Al-Khaldi (BRN)	11.43	Q
3	Dutee Chand (IND)	11.43	Q
4	Liang Xiaojing (CHN)	11.44	q
5	Nigina Sharipova (UZB)	11.53	q
6	Kristina Knott (PHI)	11.55	
7	Onuma Chattha (THA)	11.66	
8	Kim Min-ji (KOR)	12.03	

==== Heat 2 ====
- Wind: +0.1 m/s

Rank	Athlete	Time	Notes
1	Wei Yongli (CHN)	11.29	Q
2	Edidiong Odiong (BRN)	11.38	Q
3	Zaidatul Husniah Zulkifli (MAS)	11.70	Q
4	Liao Yan-jun (TPE)	11.71	
5	Lê Tú Chinh (VIE)	11.76	
6	Viktoriya Zyabkina (KAZ)	11.86	
7	Lam On Ki (HKG)	11.99	
8	Kana Ichikawa (JPN)	12.01	

=== Final ===
- Wind: +0.3 m/s

Rank	Athlete	Time	Notes
1st place, gold medalist(s)	Edidiong Odiong (BRN)	11.30	
2nd place, silver medalist(s)	Dutee Chand (IND)	11.32	
3rd place, bronze medalist(s)	Wei Yongli (CHN)	11.33	
4	Hajar Al-Khaldi (BRN)	11.38	
5	Liang Xiaojing (CHN)	11.42	
6	Olga Safronova (KAZ)	11.43	
7	Nigina Sharipova (UZB)	11.45	
8	Zaidatul Husniah Zulkifli (MAS)	11.61	
