= Liang Xiaojing =

Chinese sprinter (born 1997)

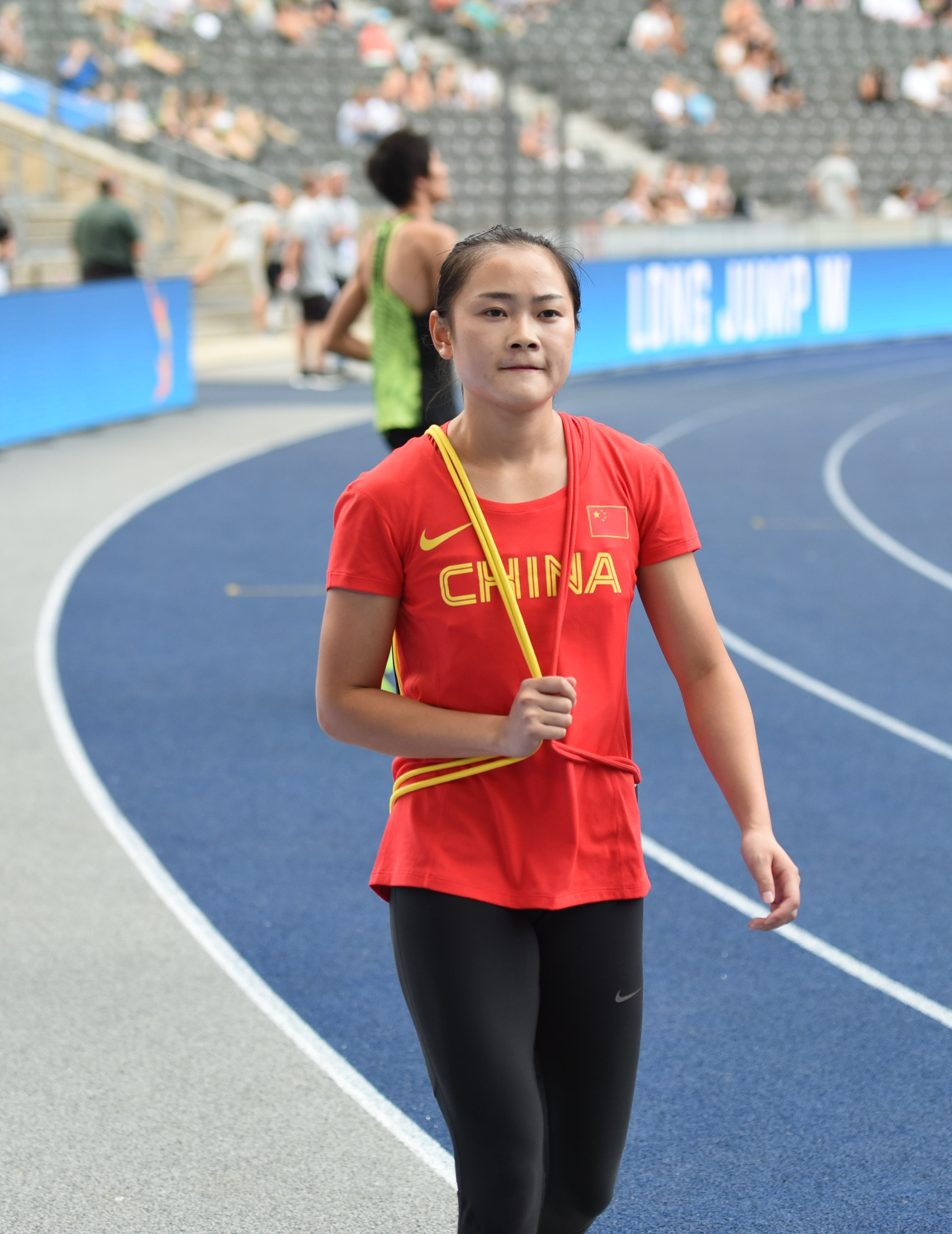
- Liang at the 2019 ISTAF in Berlin

Personal information
- Born: 7 April 1997 (age 29) Huaiji County, Guangdong, China
- Height: 1.56 m (5 ft 1 in)
- Weight: 48 kg (106 lb)

Sport
- Sport: Athletics
- Events: 100 m, 200 m
Medal record
Women's athletics
Representing China
World Relays
Silver medal – second place	2019 Yokohama	4 × 200 m relay
Bronze medal – third place	2017 Nassau	4 × 100 m relay
Asian Games
Gold medal – first place	2022 Hangzhou	4 × 100 m relay
Silver medal – second place	2018 Jakarta	4 × 100 m relay
Asian Championships
Gold medal – first place	2019 Doha	4 × 100 m relay
Gold medal – first place	2023 Bangkok	4 × 100 m relay
Gold medal – first place	2025 Gumi	4 × 100 m relay
Gold medal – first place	2025 Gumi	100 m
Silver medal – second place	2019 Doha	100 m
Asian Indoor Championships
Gold medal – first place	2018 Tehran	60 m
Summer World University Games
Gold medal – first place	2021 Chengdu	4 × 100 m

Liang Xiaojing (Chinese: 梁小静; born 7 April 1997) is a Chinese sprinter. She is the champion of the 2014 Summer Youth Olympics at 100 metres. She competed in the women's 200 metres event at the 2015 World Championships in Athletics in Beijing without advancing from the first round. She also has served on the Chinese 4 × 100 metre relay team at both the World Championships and the 2016 Olympics where she anchored the relay.

== International Competitions ==
Year	Competition	Venue	Position	Event	Notes
Representing China
2013	World Youth Championships	Donetsk, Ukraine	16th (sf)	400 m	55.46
2013	World Youth Championships	Donetsk, Ukraine	6th (h)	Medley relay	2:09.90^{1}
2013	World Championships	Moscow, Russia	17th (h)	4 × 100 m relay	44.22
2014	Asian Junior Championships	Taipei, Taiwan	1st	100 m	11.58
2014	Asian Junior Championships	Taipei, Taiwan	1st	4 × 200 m relay	45.34
2014	Youth Olympic Games	Nanjing, China	1st	100 m	11.65
2015	World Relays	Nassau, Bahamas	4th	4 × 200 m relay	1:34.89
2015	Asian Championships	Wuhan, China	9th (h)	200 m	24.17
2015	World Championships	Beijing, China	45th (h)	200 m	23.57
2015	World Championships	Beijing, China	10th (h)	4 × 100 m relay	43.18
2016	Olympic Games	Rio de Janeiro, Brazil	9th (h)	4 × 100 m relay	42.70
2017	World Relays	Nassau, Bahamas	3rd	4 × 100 m relay	43.11
2017	World Relays	Nassau, Bahamas	8th	4 × 200 m relay	1:37.60
2017	World Championships	London, United Kingdom	–	4 × 100 m relay	DQ
2018	Asian Indoor Championships	Tehran, Iran	1st	60 m	7.20
2018	World Indoor Championships	Birmingham, United Kingdom	21st (sf)	60 m	7.30
2018	Asian Games	Jakarta, Indonesia	5th	100 m	11.42
2018	Asian Games	Jakarta, Indonesia	2nd	4 × 100 m relay	42.84
2019	Asian Championships	Doha, Qatar	2nd	100 m	11.28
2019	World Relays	Yokohama, Japan	–	4 × 100 m relay	DQ
2019	World Relays	Yokohama, Japan	2nd	4 × 200 m relay	1:32.76
2019	World Championships	Doha, Qatar	13th (h)	100 m	11.20
2019	World Championships	Doha, Qatar	28th (h)	200 m	23.27
2019	World Championships	Doha, Qatar	3rd (h)	4 × 100 m relay	42.36^{1}
2021	Olympic Games	Tokyo, Japan	32nd (h)	100 m	11.40
2021	Olympic Games	Tokyo, Japan	6th	4 × 100 m relay	42.71
2022	World Championships	Eugene, United States	25th (h)	100 m	11.25
2022	World Championships	Eugene, United States	9th (h)	4 × 100 m relay	42.93
2023	Asian Championships	Bangkok, Thailand	–	100 m	DQ
2023	Asian Championships	Bangkok, Thailand	1st	4 × 100 m relay	43.35
2023	World University Games	Chengdu, China	5th	100 m	11.48
2023	World University Games	Chengdu, China	1st	4 × 100 m relay	43.70
2023	Asian Games	Hangzhou, China	1st	4 × 100 m relay	43.39
2025	World Indoor Championships	Nanjing, China	8th	60 m	7.14
2025	Asian Championships	Gumi, South Korea	1st	100 m	11.37
2025	Asian Championships	Gumi, South Korea	1st	4 × 100 m relay	43.28
2025	World Championships	Tokyo, Japan	28th (h)	100 m	11.29

^{1}Disqualified in the final

== Personal bests ==
- Information from World Athletics profile unless otherwise noted.

Outdoor

- 100 metres – 11.13 (+0.7 m/s, Berlin 2019)
- 200 metres – 22.93 (+0.2 m/s, Shenyang 2019)
- 400 metres – 54.76 (Weifang 2013)

Indoor

- 60 metres – 7.17 (Louisville 2022)
- 200 metres – 23.99 (Beijing 2014)
