= Athletics at the 2014 Asian Games – Women's 4 × 100 metres relay =

2014 Asian games- women's 4× 100 metres relay

Women's 4 × 100 metres relay at the 2014 Asian Games
- Venue: Incheon Asiad Main Stadium
- Dates: 2 October 2014
- Competitors: 32 from 8 nations

Medalists
gold medal	China; Tao Yujia, Kong Lingwei, Lin Huijun, Wei Yongli
silver medal	Kazakhstan; Svetlana Ivanchukova, Viktoriya Zyabkina, Anastassiya Tulapina, Olga Safronova
bronze medal	Japan; Anna Fujimori, Kana Ichikawa, Masumi Aoki, Chisato Fukushima

The women's 4 × 100 metres relay event at the 2014 Asian Games was held at the Incheon Asiad Main Stadium, Incheon, South Korea on 2 October.

== Schedule ==
All times are Korea Standard Time (UTC+09:00)

Date	Time	Event
Thursday, 2 October 2014	19:25	Final

== Records ==
Prior to this competition, the existing world, Asian and Games records were as follows.

World Record	United States	40.82	London, United Kingdom	10 August 2012
Asian Record	China	42.23	Shanghai, China	23 October 1997
Games Record	China	43.36	Bangkok, Thailand	15 December 1998

== Results ==
Rank	Team	Time	Notes
1st place, gold medalist(s)	China (CHN); Tao Yujia; Kong Lingwei; Lin Huijun; Wei Yongli	42.83	GR
2nd place, silver medalist(s)	Kazakhstan (KAZ); Svetlana Ivanchukova; Viktoriya Zyabkina; Anastassiya Tulapina; Olga Safronova	43.90	
3rd place, bronze medalist(s)	Japan (JPN); Anna Fujimori; Kana Ichikawa; Masumi Aoki; Chisato Fukushima	44.05	
4	Thailand (THA); Phatsorn Jaksuninkorn; Phensri Chairoek; Tassaporn Wannakit; Nongnuch Sanrat	44.39	
5	South Korea (KOR); Lee Sun-ae; Kang Da-seul; Joung Han-sol; Kim Min-ji	44.60	
6	India (IND); Sharadha Narayana; Asha Roy; Srabani Nanda; H. M. Jyothi	44.91	
7	Chinese Taipei (TPE); Syu Yong-jie; Liao Ching-hsien; Ko Ching-ting; Hu Chia-chen	44.99	
8	Hong Kong (HKG); Fong Yee Pui; Leung Hau Sze; Lui Lai Yiu; Lam On Ki	46.14	
