= Kristina Knott =

Filipino-American track and field athlete

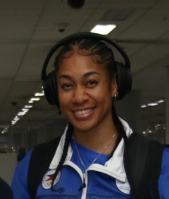
- Knott upon her return to the Philippines after the 2022 Asian Games

Personal information
- Full name: Kristina Marie Knott
- Nickname: KK
- Nationality: Filipino / American
- Born: Kristina Marie Lamb Knott; September 25, 1995 (age 30) Orlando, Florida, U.S.

Sport
- Country: Philippines
- Sport: Track and field
- Event: 200 meters
- College team: Arkansas State Red Wolves; Miami Hurricanes
- Coached by: Rohsaan Griffin

Achievements and titles
- Personal best: 200 m: 23.01 (2019, NR); 100 m: 11.27 (2020, NR)
Medal record
Women's athletics
Representing Philippines
| Event | 1st | 2nd | 3rd |
|---|---|---|---|
| Asian Beach Games | 0 | 1 | 0 |
| SEA Games | 2 | 2 | 1 |
| Total | 2 | 3 | 1 |
Asian Beach Games
| Silver medal – second place | 2026 Sanya | 4×60 m relay |
SEA Games
| Gold medal – first place | 2019 Philippines | 4×100 m mixed relay |
| Gold medal – first place | 2019 Philippines | 200 m |
| Silver medal – second place | 2019 Philippines | 100 m |
| Silver medal – second place | 2019 Philippines | 4×100 m relay |
| Bronze medal – third place | 2025 Thailand | 4×100 m relay |

Kristina Marie "KK" Lamb Knott (born September 25, 1995) is a Filipino American track and field athlete. She is the holder of the Philippine national record for the women's 100 meters and women's 200 meters races.

== Early life ==
Kristina Knott was born on September 25, 1995, in Orlando, Florida in the United States. She was born to Harold Knott and Rizalina Lamb, the former being a United States citizen while the latter is a Filipina from Imus, Cavite. She graduated from Colonial High School in Orlando. For her collegiate studies, Knott attended Arkansas State University for her freshman and sophomore year, before moving to the University of Miami, where she graduated with a degree in Creative Writing.

== Career ==
Knott became part of the national athletics team of the Philippines after she established contact with the officials of the country's national athletics federation through her connection with fellow Filipino-American athletes. She volunteered herself to compete for the Philippines as part of her efforts to connect with her Filipino heritage. She made her international debut for the Philippines at the 2018 Asian Games in Jakarta where she was the only Southeast Asian who qualified for the final of the 200 meters event. She finished sixth by recording a time of 23.51 seconds.

Knott represented the Philippines at the 2019 Southeast Asian Games. At the heats of the 200-meter event she set a new Philippine national record set by finishing the race at 23.07 seconds. She surpassed Zion Corrales Nelson's 23.16 seconds finish in Sacramento set on the same year. This also broke the Southeast Asian Games record set by Supavadee Khawpeag in 2001 who clocked 23.30 seconds. Knott surpassed her own record by finishing at 23.01 seconds in the final which secured her the women's 200 meters event gold medal. However the finish was still behind the Olympic qualifying time of 22.8 seconds. Knott also won a gold medal in the 4x100-meter mixed relay event and two silver medals in the women's 100-meter sprint and 4x100-meter relay.

She was due to compete at the 2020 Asian Indoor Athletics Championships which was cancelled due to the COVID-19 pandemic.

Knott broke the 33-year Philippine national record for the women's 100 meter dash set by Lydia de Vega at the 1987 Southeast Asian Games by clocking 11.27 seconds. Knott surpassed de Vega's record by .01 seconds during the 2020 Drake Blue Oval Showcase in Des Moines, Iowa.

=== International competitions ===
| Year | Competition | Venue | Position | Event | Notes |
Representing Philippines
| 2018 | Asian Games | Jakarta, Indonesia | 9th (sf) | 100 m | 11.55 |
| 2018 | Asian Games | Jakarta, Indonesia | 6th | 200 m | 23.51 |
| 2019 | Asian Athletics Championships | Doha, Qatar | 13th (sf) | 100 m | 11.77 |
| 2019 | Asian Athletics Championships | Doha, Qatar | 9th (sf) | 200 m | 23.73 |
| 2019 | Southeast Asian Games | Tarlac, Philippines | 2nd | 100 m | 11.55 |
| 2019 | Southeast Asian Games | Tarlac, Philippines | 1st | 200 m | 23.01 NR GR |
| 2019 | Southeast Asian Games | Tarlac, Philippines | 2nd | 4 × 100 m relay | 44.57 |
| 2019 | Southeast Asian Games | Tarlac, Philippines | 1st | 4 × 100 m Mixed relay | 41.67 |
| 2021 | Olympic Games | Tokyo, Japan | 5th (h) | 200 m | 23.80 |
| 2022 | World Athletics Indoor Championships | Belgrade, Serbia | 37th (h) | 60 m | 7.39 SB |
| 2023 | Asian Athletics Championships | Bangkok, Thailand | 6th | 100 m | 11.61 |
| 2025 | Asian Championships | Gumi, South Korea | – | 100 m | DQ |
| 2025 | Asian Championships | Gumi, South Korea | 6th | 200 m | 23.82 |
