= Hideki Omuro =

Japanese hurdler

Personal information
- Born: 25 July 1990 (age 35) Saitama Prefecture, Japan
- Education: University of Tsukuba
- Height: 1.80 m (5 ft 11 in)
- Weight: 70 kg (154 lb)

Sport
- Sport: Athletics
- Event: 110 metres hurdles
- Club: Otsuka Pharmaceutical
Medal record
Men's athletics
Representing Japan
Asian Indoor Championships
Bronze medal – third place	2018 Tehran	60 m hurdles

Hideki Omuro (大室 秀樹, Ōmuro Hideki; born 25 July 1990) is a Japanese athlete specialising in the high hurdles. He represented his country at the 2017 World Championships without qualifying for the semifinals.

His personal bests are 13.52 seconds in the 110 metres hurdles (+1.5 m/s, Hiroshima 2017) and 7.80 seconds in the 60 metres hurdles (Tehran 2018).

== International competitions ==
Year	Competition	Venue	Position	Event	Notes
Representing Japan
2013	Universiade	Kazan, Russia	11th (h)	110 m hurdles	13.97 (w)
2017	World Championships	London, United Kingdom	34th (h)	110 m hurdles	13.78
2018	Asian Indoor Championships	Tehran, Iran	3rd	60 m hurdles	7.81
