= Anna Bulanova =

Kyrgyzstani sprinter and long jumper

Personal information
- Born: 12 May 1994 (age 32)

Sport
- Sport: Athletics
- Events: 100 m, 200 m, long jump
Medal record
Women's athletics
Representing Kyrgyzstan
Asian Indoor Championships
Bronze medal – third place	2012 Hangzhou	4×400 m

Anna Bulanova (Cyrillic: Анна Буланова; born 12 May 1994) is a Kyrgyzstani sprinter and long jumper. She represented her country in the 60 metres at the 2012 World Indoor Championships without advancing from the first round.

== International competitions ==
Year	Competition	Venue	Position	Event	Notes
Representing Kyrgyzstan
2011	World Youth Championships	Lille, France	49th (h)	100 m	12.82
2012	Asian Indoor Championships	Hangzhou, China	3rd	4 × 400 m relay	3:56.11
2012	Asian Indoor Championships	Hangzhou, China	8th	Long jump	4.94 m
2012	World Indoor Championships	Istanbul, Turkey	50th (h)	60 m	8.19
2014	Asian Indoor Championships	Hangzhou, China	4th	4 × 400 m relay	4:12.29
2014	Asian Indoor Championships	Hangzhou, China	7th	Long jump	5.78 m
2015	Asian Championships	Wuhan, China	7th	Long jump	6.10 m
2015	Universiade	Gwangju, South Korea	25th (q)	Long jump	5.44 m
2016	Asian Indoor Championships	Doha, Qatar	9th	Long jump	5.84 m
2018	Asian Indoor Championships	Tehran, Iran	8th	60 m	7.57
2018	Asian Games	Jakarta, Indonesia	12th (h)	200 m	24.16
2018	Asian Games	Jakarta, Indonesia	11th	Long jump	6.09 m
2019	Asian Championships	Doha, Qatar	7th	100 m	11.61
2019	Asian Championships	Doha, Qatar	8th	200 m	23.70
2019	Universiade	Naples, Italy	28th (h)	100 m	11.88
2019	Universiade	Naples, Italy	26th (h)	200 m	24.23

== Personal bests ==
Outdoors

- 100 metres – 11.55 (-0.1 m/s, Doha 2019)
- 200 metres – 23.55 (+0.6 m/s, Doha 2019)
- Long jump – 6.28 (0.0 m/s, Bishkek 2018)

Indoors

- 60 metres – 7.45 (Ust-Kamenogorsk 2019)
- 200 metres – 24.28 (Ust-Kamenogorsk 2019)
