= Aziza Sbaity =

Lebanese sprinter (born 1991)

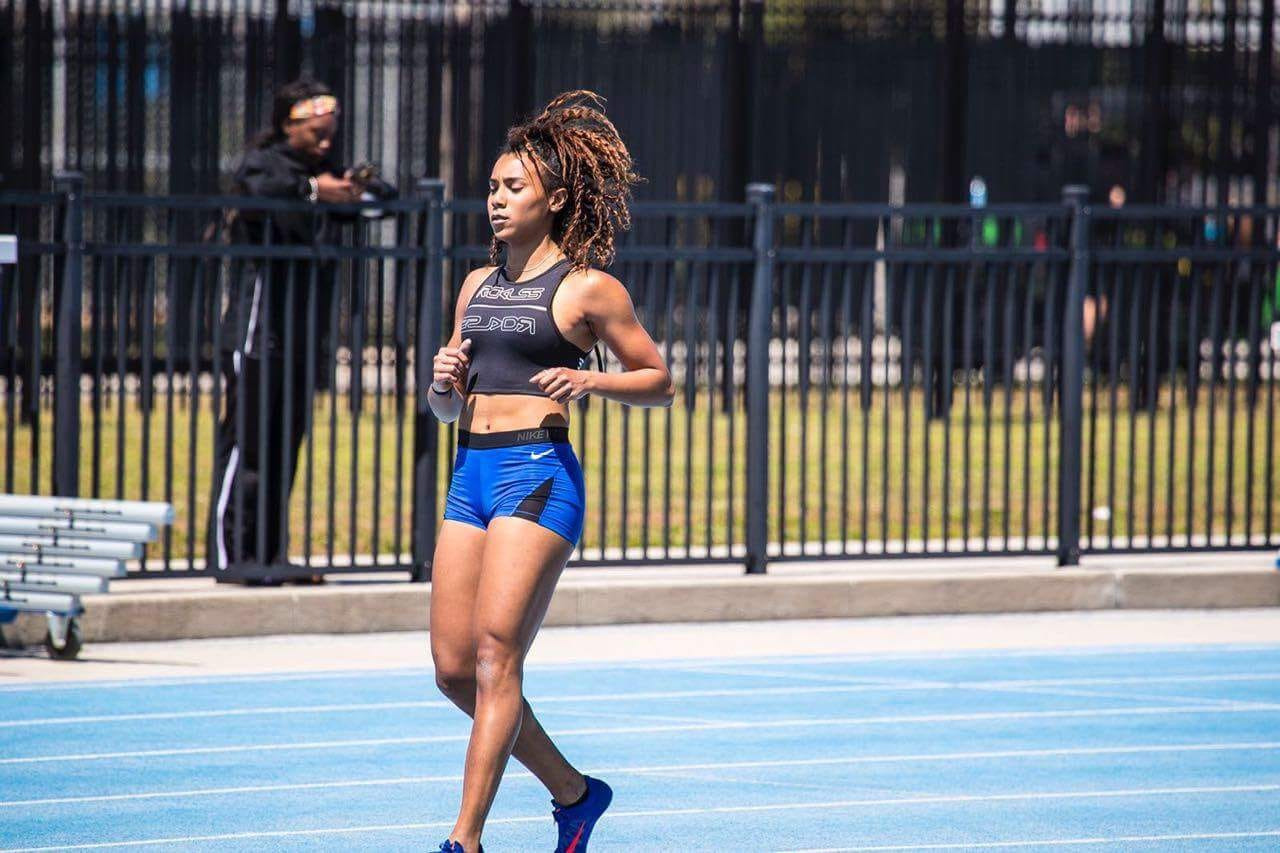
- Sbaity in 2017

Personal information
- Born: 17 November 1991 (age 34) Monrovia, Liberia
- Height: 1.71 m (5 ft 7 in)
- Weight: 65 kg (143 lb)

Sport
- Sport: Athletics
- Events: 100 metres, 200 metres

Aziza Sbaity (Arabic: عزيزة سبيتي, romanized: ʻAzīzah Subaytī; born 17 November 1991) is a Lebanese-Liberian sprinter. She is the 100m Lebanese national record holder and she has represented her country at one outdoor and two indoor World Championships. Born in Monrovia to a Liberian mother and Lebanese father, Sbaity moved with her family to Lebanon aged 10, escaping the civil war in Liberia. She grew up in Kafra, Bint Jbeil District, and studied at SABIS.

In November 2023, Sbaity was named to the BBC's 100 Women list.

== Competition record ==
Year	Competition	Venue	Position	Event	Notes
Representing Lebanon
2010	World Junior Championships	Moncton, Canada	32nd (h)	100 m	12.44
2010	West Asian Championships	Aleppo, Syria	4th	100 m	12.44
2010	West Asian Championships	Aleppo, Syria	2nd	4 × 100 m relay	51.40
2010	West Asian Championships	Aleppo, Syria	2nd	4 × 400 m relay	3:59.59
2012	West Asian Championships	Dubai, United Arab Emirates	2nd	4 × 400 m relay	4:07.28
2014	Asian Indoor Championships	Hangzhou, China	9th (h)	60 m	7.92
2014	World Indoor Championships	Sopot, Poland	35th (h)	60 m	7.82
2015	Asian Championships	Wuhan, China	15th (sf)	100 m	12.11
2015	Asian Championships	Wuhan, China	12th (h)	200 m	25.02
2015	World Championships	Beijing, China	44th (h)	100 m	11.98
2016	Asian Indoor Championships	Doha, Qatar	17th (h)	60 m	7.67
2016	World Indoor Championships	Portland, United States	38th (h)	60 m	7.78
2017	Jeux de la Francophonie	Abidjan, Ivory Coast	11th (h)	100 m	12.08
2017	Asian Indoor and Martial Arts Games	Ashgabat, Turkmenistan	14th (h)	60 m	7.77
2018	Asian Indoor Championships	Tehran, Iran	4th (h)	60 m	7.69
2018	West Asian Championships	Amman, Jordan	3rd	100 m	11.75
2018	West Asian Championships	Amman, Jordan	2nd	200 m	24.20
2018	West Asian Championships	Amman, Jordan	2nd	4 × 100 m relay	48.60
2018	Asian Games	Jakarta, Indonesia	24th (h)	100 m	12.02
2018	Asian Games	Jakarta, Indonesia	18th (h)	200 m	24.55
2019	Arab Championships	Cairo, Egypt	5th	100 m	12.33
2019	Arab Championships	Cairo, Egypt	4th	200 m	24.53
2019	Arab Championships	Cairo, Egypt	3rd	4 × 100 m relay	47.83
2019	Asian Championships	Doha, Qatar	12th (sf)	100 m	11.73
2019	Asian Championships	Doha, Qatar	15th (h)	200 m	24.25
2021	Arab Championships	Radès, Tunisia	3rd	100 m	11.68
2021	Arab Championships	Radès, Tunisia	4th	200 m	23.80
2021	Arab Championships	Radès, Tunisia	3rd	4 × 400 m relay	4:12.88
2022	World Indoor Championships	Belgrade, Serbia	42nd (h)	60 m	7.47
2023	Asian Indoor Championships	Astana, Kazakhstan	14th (h)	60 m	7.58
2023	West Asian Championships	Doha, Qatar	2nd	100 m	11.6
2023	West Asian Championships	Doha, Qatar	1st	100 m	24.12
2023	West Asian Championships	Doha, Qatar	1st	4 × 100 m relay	47.32
2023	Arab Championships	Marrakesh, Morocco	2nd	100 m	11.69
2023	Arab Championships	Marrakesh, Morocco	1st	200 m	23.81
2023	Asian Championships	Bangkok, Thailand	7th	100 m	11.61
2023	Asian Championships	Bangkok, Thailand	7th	200 m	23.77
2023	Jeux de la Francophonie	Kinshasa, DR Congo	7th	200 m	23.95
2023	Asian Games	Hangzhou, China	10th (h)	100 m	11.71
2023	Asian Games	Hangzhou, China	12th (h)	200 m	24.57
2024	World Indoor Championships	Glasgow, United Kingdom	48th (h)	60 m	7.56
2025	Arab Championships	Oran, Algeria	3rd	100 m	11.95
2026	Mediterranean Games	Taranto, Italy	9th (h)	100 m	11.90
2026	Mediterranean Games	Taranto, Italy	10th (h)	200 m	24.07

== Personal bests ==
Outdoor

- 100 meters – 11.68 (0.0 m/s, Tunis 2021)
- 200 meters – 23.77 (+1.5 m/s, Montpellier 2021)

Indoor

- 60 meters – 7.51 (Marseille 2020)
- 200 meters – 24.43 (Istanbul 2021)
