= Viktoriya Zyabkina =

Kazakhstani sprinter (born 1992)

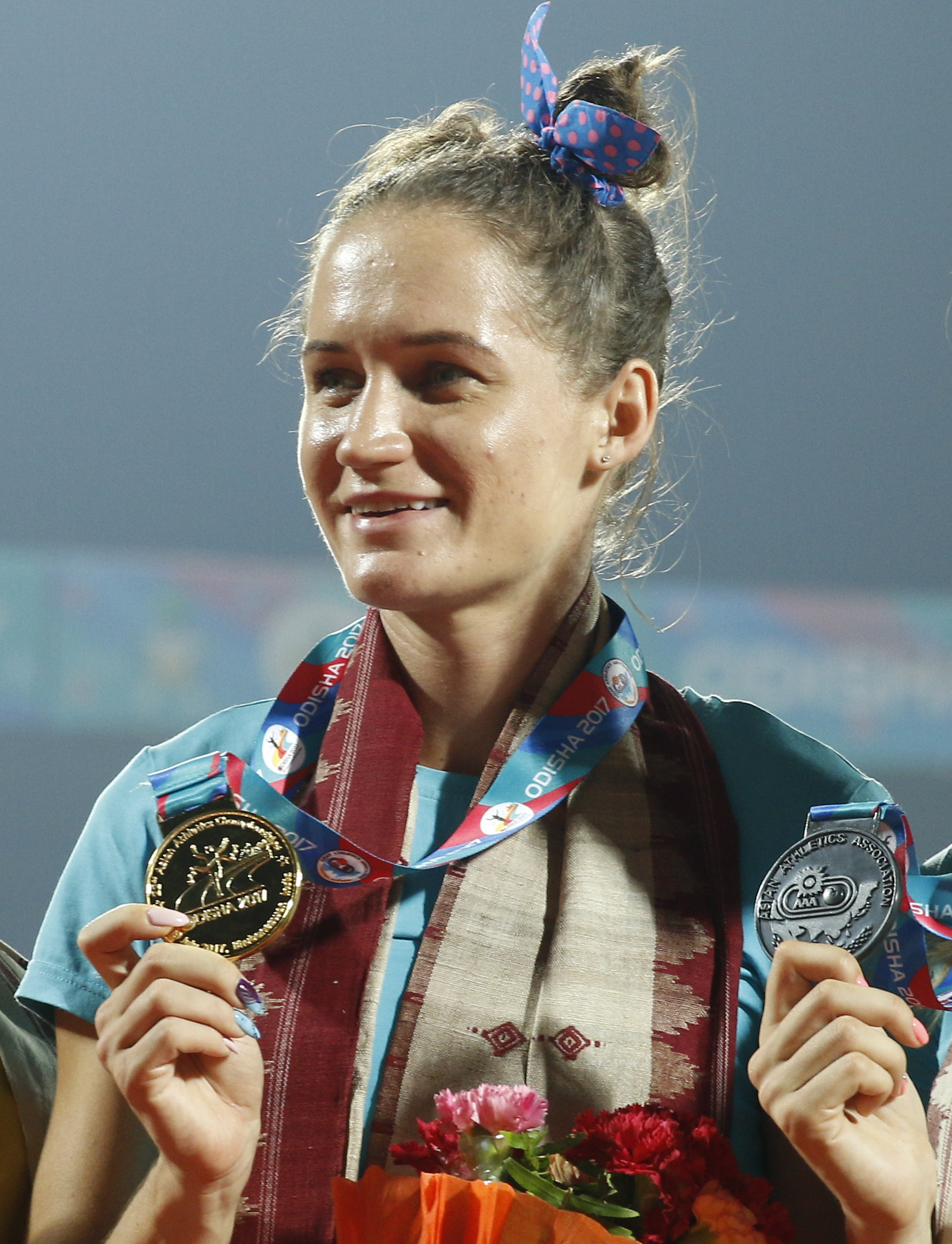
- Zyabkina at the 2017 Asian Championships

Personal information
- Born: 4 September 1992 (age 33) Almaty, Kazakhstan
- Education: Sports education Translator/interpreter; Al-Farabi Kazakh National University; Turan University
- Height: 1.73 m (5 ft 8 in)
- Weight: 65 kg (143 lb)

Sport
- Sport: Athletics
- Event: 100–400 m
- Coached by: Lyubov Nikitenko

Achievements and titles
- Personal best(s): 100 m – 11.15 (2016); 200 m – 22.66 (2016); 400 m – 51.67 (2012)
Medal record
Women's athletics
Representing Kazakhstan
Asian Indoor Championships
Gold medal – first place	2016 Doha	60 m
Gold medal – first place	2018 Tehran	4×400 m
Silver medal – second place	2018 Tehran	60 m
Bronze medal – third place	2012 Hangzhou	60 m

Viktoriya Viktorovna Zyabkina (Cyrillic: Виктория Викторовна Зябкина; born 4 September 1992) is a Kazakhstani sprinter who mostly competes in the 100 m and 200 m distances. She represented her country at the 2012 and 2016 Summer Olympics, but failed to reach the finals. She won a silver and a bronze medal in the 4 × 100 m relay at the 2014 and 2018 Asian Games, respectively. Between 2013 and 2017 she won five gold and one silver medals at the Asian Championships, five of them in individual events.

== Personal life ==
Zyabkina took up athletics in 2002 following her parents. Her father Viktor Zyabkin was a member of the Soviet national 4 × 100 m relay team. Her mother Oksana Zelinskaya competed for the Soviet Union in triple jump and was an Asian champion in this event. Zyabkina debuted internationally in 2010. She has degrees in sports education from the Al-Farabi Kazakh National University and in English-Russian translation from the Turan University.

== Competition record ==
Year	Competition	Venue	Position	Event	Notes
Representing Kazakhstan
2009	World Youth Championships	Brixen, Italy	32nd (h)	200 m	12.38
2010	Asian Junior Championships	Hanoi, Vietnam	3rd	200 m	24.55
2010	Asian Junior Championships	Hanoi, Vietnam	–	4 × 100 m relay	DQ
2010	Asian Games	Guangzhou, China	18th (h)	100 m	12.07
2010	Asian Games	Guangzhou, China	–	4 × 100 m relay	DNF
2011	World Championships	Daegu, South Korea	31st (h)	200 m	24.09
2012	Asian Indoor Championships	Hangzhou, China	3rd	60 m	7.44
2012	World Indoor Championships	Istanbul, Turkey	32nd (h)	60 m	7.55
2012	Olympic Games	London, United Kingdom	38th (h)	200 m	23.49
2013	Asian Championships	Pune, India	1st	200 m	23.62
2013	Asian Championships	Pune, India	4th	4 × 400 m relay	3:36.09
2013	World Championships	Moscow, Russia	44th (h)	200 m	24.47
2014	Asian Games	Incheon, South Korea	4th	100 m	11.67
2014	Asian Games	Incheon, South Korea	7th	200 m	23.69
2014	Asian Games	Incheon, South Korea	2nd	4 × 100 m relay	43.90
2015	IAAF World Relays	Nassau, Bahamas	6th (B)	4 × 100 m relay	44.89
2015	Asian Championships	Wuhan, China	2nd	100 m	11.34
2015	Asian Championships	Wuhan, China	1st	200 m	23.09
2015	Asian Championships	Wuhan, China	–	4 × 100 m relay	DQ
2015	Universiade	Gwangju, South Korea	1st	100 m	11.23
2015	Universiade	Gwangju, South Korea	1st	200 m	22.77
2015	Universiade	Gwangju, South Korea	1st	4 × 100 m relay	44.28
2015	World Championships	Beijing, China	18th (sf)	100 m	11.19
2015	World Championships	Beijing, China	12th (sf)	200 m	22.77
2016	Asian Indoor Championships	Doha, Qatar	1st	60 m	7.27
2016	World Indoor Championships	Portland, United States	31st (h)	60 m	7.47
2016	Olympic Games	Rio de Janeiro, Brazil	50th (h)	100 m	11.69
2016	Olympic Games	Rio de Janeiro, Brazil	45th (h)	200 m	23.34
2016	Olympic Games	Rio de Janeiro, Brazil	–	4 × 100 m relay	DQ
2017	Asian Championships	Bhubaneswar, India	1st	100 m	11.39
2017	Asian Championships	Bhubaneswar, India	1st	200 m	23.10
2017	Asian Championships	Bhubaneswar, India	1st	4 × 100 m relay	43.53
2017	World Championships	London, United Kingdom	32nd (h)	200 m	23.66
2017	World Championships	London, United Kingdom	13th (h)	4 × 100 m relay	45.47
2017	Universiade	Taipei, Taiwan	4th	100 m	11.49
2017	Universiade	Taipei, Taiwan	2nd (h)	4 × 100 m relay	44.14^{1}
2017	Asian Indoor and Martial Arts Games	Ashgabat, Turkmenistan	1st	60 m	7.32
2018	Asian Indoor Championships	Tehran, Iran	2nd	60 m	7.39
2018	Asian Indoor Championships	Tehran, Iran	1st	4 × 400 m relay	3:41.67
2018	Asian Games	Jakarta, Indonesia	13th (sf)	100 m	11.86
2018	Asian Games	Jakarta, Indonesia	–	200 m	DQ
2018	Asian Games	Jakarta, Indonesia	3rd	4 × 100 m relay	43.82
2025	Asian Championships	Gumi, South Korea	14th (h)	400 m	55.70
2025	Asian Championships	Gumi, South Korea	4th	4 × 400 m relay	3:40.71

^{1}Disqualified in the final
