= Christophe Boulos =

Lebanese sprinter (born 1996)

Chris Boulos
Personal information
- Nationality: Lebanese
- Born: 20 August 1996 (age 30)
- Height: 1.68
- Weight: 83

Sport
- Sport: Powerlifting/sprinting
- Event: 60-100-200m sprint / u83kg powerlifter
- Club: Qatar Powerlifting Team

Christophe Boulos is a Lebanese strength coach, powerlifter, and former professional sprinter with more than nine years of coaching experience.

He began his athletic career in sprinting before transitioning into powerlifting, where he has spent more than five years competing at an international level. Through consistent training and competition, Christophe has developed a 745 kg powerlifting total and has competed at major international competitions, including the Asian and World stages.

Alongside his competitive career, Christophe has built his work around coaching athletes and developing strength and performance. His coaching approach combines evidence-based training principles, practical experience, and individualized programming tailored to each athlete’s goals, experience, and performance demands.

Christophe’s training philosophy is centered on long-term development, structured progression, technical improvement, and sustainable performance. He works with athletes of different levels, from those beginning their strength-training journey to competitive powerlifters preparing for major competitions.
