= Dutee Chand =

Indian sprinter (born 1996)

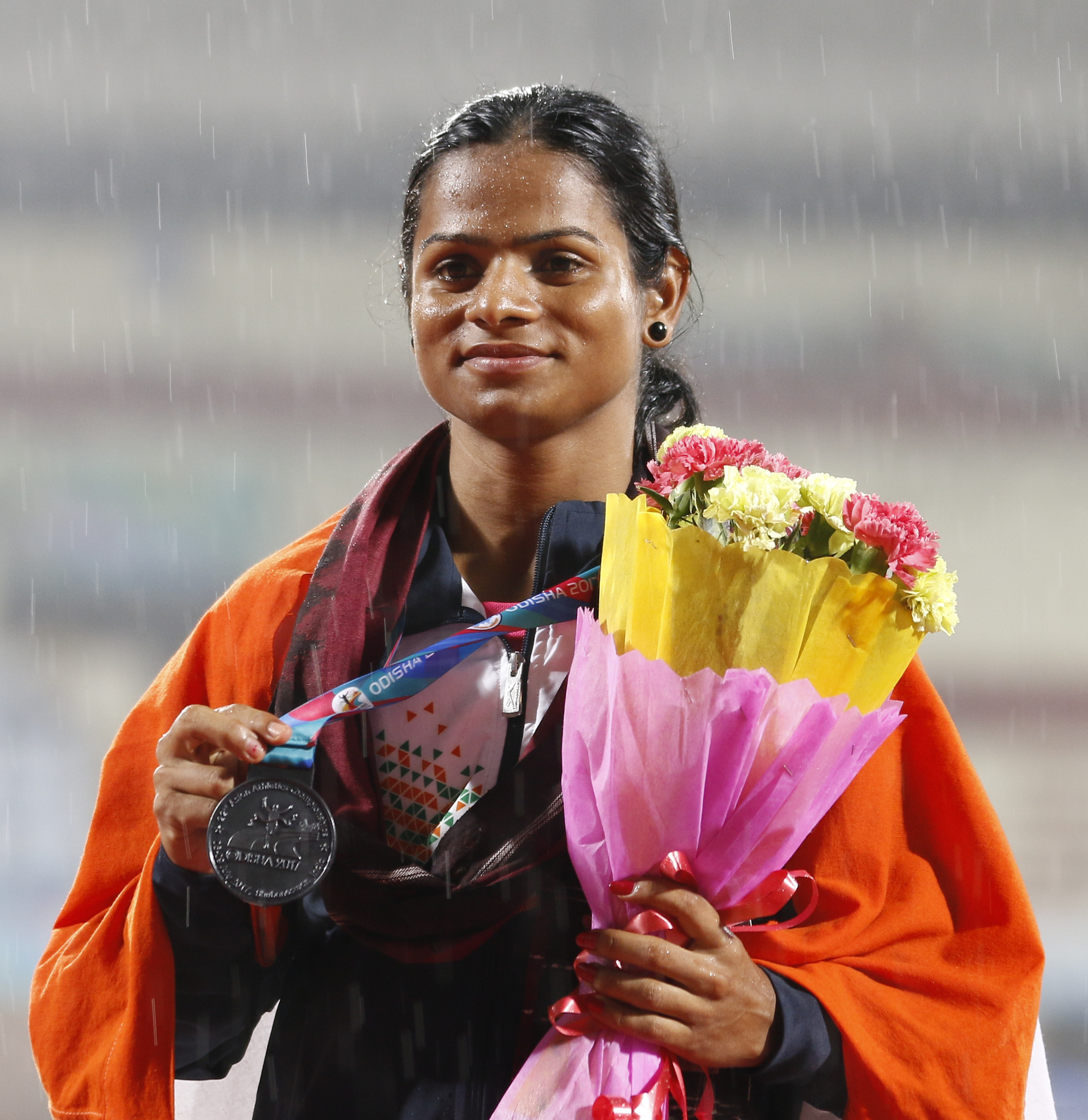
- Chand at the 2017 Asian Championships

Personal information
- Born: 3 February 1996 (age 30) Chaka Gopalpur, Odisha, India
- Education: Kalinga Institute of Industrial Technology
- Height: 1.67 m (5 ft 6 in)

Sport
- Events: 60 m, 100 m, 200 m

Achievements and titles
- Personal bests: 60 m (i): 7.28 NR (2016); 100 m: 11.17 NR (2021); 200 m: 23.00 (2018)
Medal record
Women's athletics
Representing India
Asian Games
Silver medal – second place	2018 Jakarta	100 m
Silver medal – second place	2018 Jakarta	200 m
Asian Championships
Bronze medal – third place	2013 Pune	200 m
Bronze medal – third place	2017 Bhubaneswar	100 m
Bronze medal – third place	2017 Bhubaneswar	4×100m
Bronze medal – third place	2019 Doha	200 m
Asian Indoor Championships
Bronze medal – third place	2016 Doha	60 m
South Asian Games
Silver medal – second place	2016 Guwahati	100 m
Bronze medal – third place	2016 Guwahati	200 m
World University Games
Gold medal – first place	2019 Naples	100 m
Asian Junior Championships
Gold medal – first place	2014 Taipei	200 m
Gold medal – first place	2014 Taipei	4×400m

Dutee Chand (born 3 February 1996) is an Indian former sprinter who specialized in the women's 100 m and 200 m events. She is the third Indian woman ever to qualify for the women's 100 m event at the Olympics, and has represented India at the 2016 and 2020 Olympic Games.

== Early life ==
The third of seven children, Chand was born on 3 February 1996, into a below-poverty-line weaver's family in Chaka Gopalpur, a small village in Jajpur district in the state of Odisha, one of the poorest areas in India. Her older sister Saraswati, a state-level runner, was her source of inspiration. At the age of four, Chand began engaging in workouts along with Saraswati on their village's local track. In 2006, when Chand was 10 years old, they were enrolled in a government sports hostel. Chand was no longer living at home and was training in a national program three hours away where she practiced track. This national program enabled her to send financial support to her family, allowing them to move from their two-room, bathroomless house. In 2013, she enrolled in the KIIT University to study law.

== Career ==
=== 2012–2013 ===
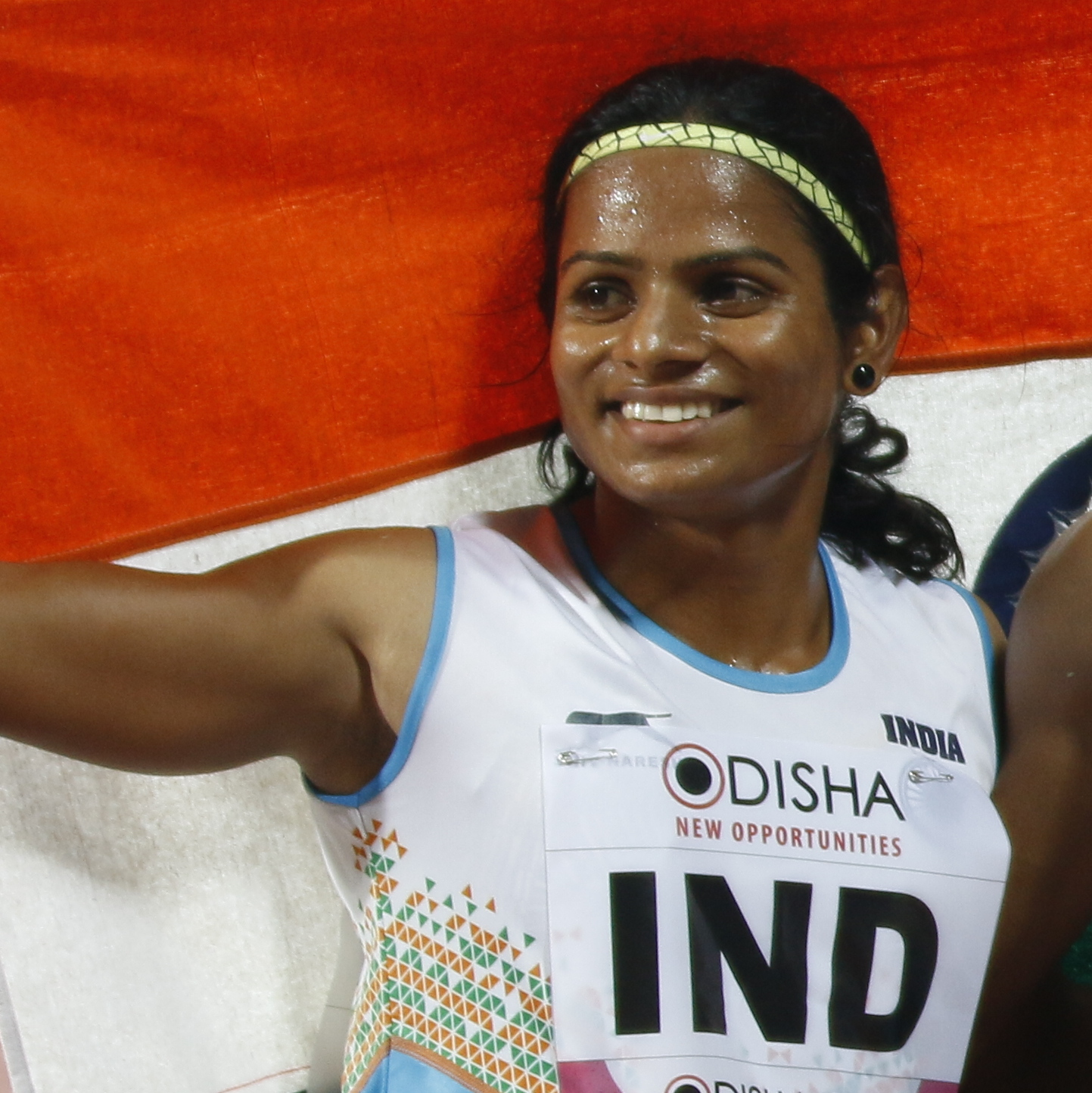

In 2012, Chand became a national champion in the under-18 category, when she clocked 11.85 seconds in the national youth junior athletic championships. In fact, following the rule by the International Association of Athletics Federations states that Chand could only be allowed to compete again if she lowers her testosterone levels that falls under beneath the male range. Chand states that "I feel that it's wrong to have to change your body for sport participation," and then she follows it with "I'm not changing for anyone."

In 2013, she enrolled in the KIIT University to study law. As of 2016, she is employed as an executive officer in the state PSU The Odisha Mining Corporation Ltd. Clocking 23.811 seconds, Chand won the bronze in the Women's 200 metres event at the 2013 Asian Athletics Championships at Pune. The year also saw her become the first Indian to reach the final of a global athletics 100 metres final, when she reached the final in the 2013 World Youth Championships. In the same year, she became the national champion in 100 metres and 200 metres when she won the events clocking 11.73 s in the final in 100 metres and a career-best 23.73 s in 200 metres at the National Senior Athletics Championships at Ranchi.

=== 2014-2015 hyperandrogenism controversy ===
In June 2014, Chand won two gold medals at the Asian Junior Athletics Championships in 200 metres and 4 × 400 m relays. In the 200m event she improved her previous timing to 23.74 seconds and was hoping to qualify for the Commonwealth Games but Chand was dropped from the 2014 Commonwealth Games contingent at the last minute after the Athletic Federation of India declared her ineligible to compete as a female athlete due to hyperandrogenism. Following the Commonwealth Games she was also excluded from the Indian contingent for the 2014 Asian Games. There was no suggestion that Chand was involved in cheating or doping, and the decision was widely criticized by intersex advocates.

Chand appealed to the Court of Arbitration for Sport (CAS). The Canadian law firm Davies, Ward, Philips & Vineberg, LLP represented her on a pro bono basis. The IAAF policy on hyperandrogenism, or high natural levels of testosterone in women, was suspended following the case of Dutee Chand v. Athletics Federation of India (AFI) & The International Association of Athletics Federations (IAAF), in the Court of Arbitration for Sport, decided in July 2015. The ruling found that there was a lack of evidence provided that testosterone increased female athletic performance and notified the IAAF that it had two years to provide the evidence. This ruling effectively lifted Chand's suspension, clearing her to compete again.

In CAS proceedings, Chand said she was subjected to intrusive questioning and physical examinations, including genital examinations that she found humiliating. Pape summarizes this process as one that left Chand feeling vulnerable and without meaningful choice. Santhi Soundarajan, an Indian middle-distance runner, extended her support to Chand, saying that Chand should not be "victimized". She said that steps should be taken to ensure Chand's return to the track. Commenting in 2018 on the case of the intersex runner Caster Semenya, Chand expressed her pain and struggle of four years, when she was controversially not allowed to compete in any international events due to hyperandrogenism. "These four years have been extremely tough for me. The negativity, fear of my career ending prematurely, and insensitive comments about my body—I have faced them all. I am extremely relieved that I can run fearlessly again, knowing that now my battle exists only on the track and not off it."

=== 2016 ===
Following the hyperandrogenism rule change, Chand resumed competing and participated in 60 metres at the 2016 Asian Indoor Athletics Championships, where she set the Indian national record of 7.28 seconds in the qualification round and went on to win the bronze medal in the final with a time of 7.37 seconds.

Chand clocked 11.33 seconds in the women's 100m dash to win the gold and erase Rachita Mistry's 16-year-old earlier national record of 11.38 s in the 2016 Federation Cup National Athletics Championships in New Delhi. However, she missed the Rio Olympics qualification norm of 11.32 s by one-hundredth of a second. On 25 June 2016, Chand broke the same national record twice in one day after clocking 11.24 at the XXVI International Meeting G Kosanov Memorial at Almaty, Kazakhstan, thereby qualifying for the Olympic Games. "I am really happy at the moment; it has been a tough year for me, and I am so happy that my coach... and my hard work has paid off. I would like to thank all the people in India who were praying for me to qualify. Your wishes have paid off."

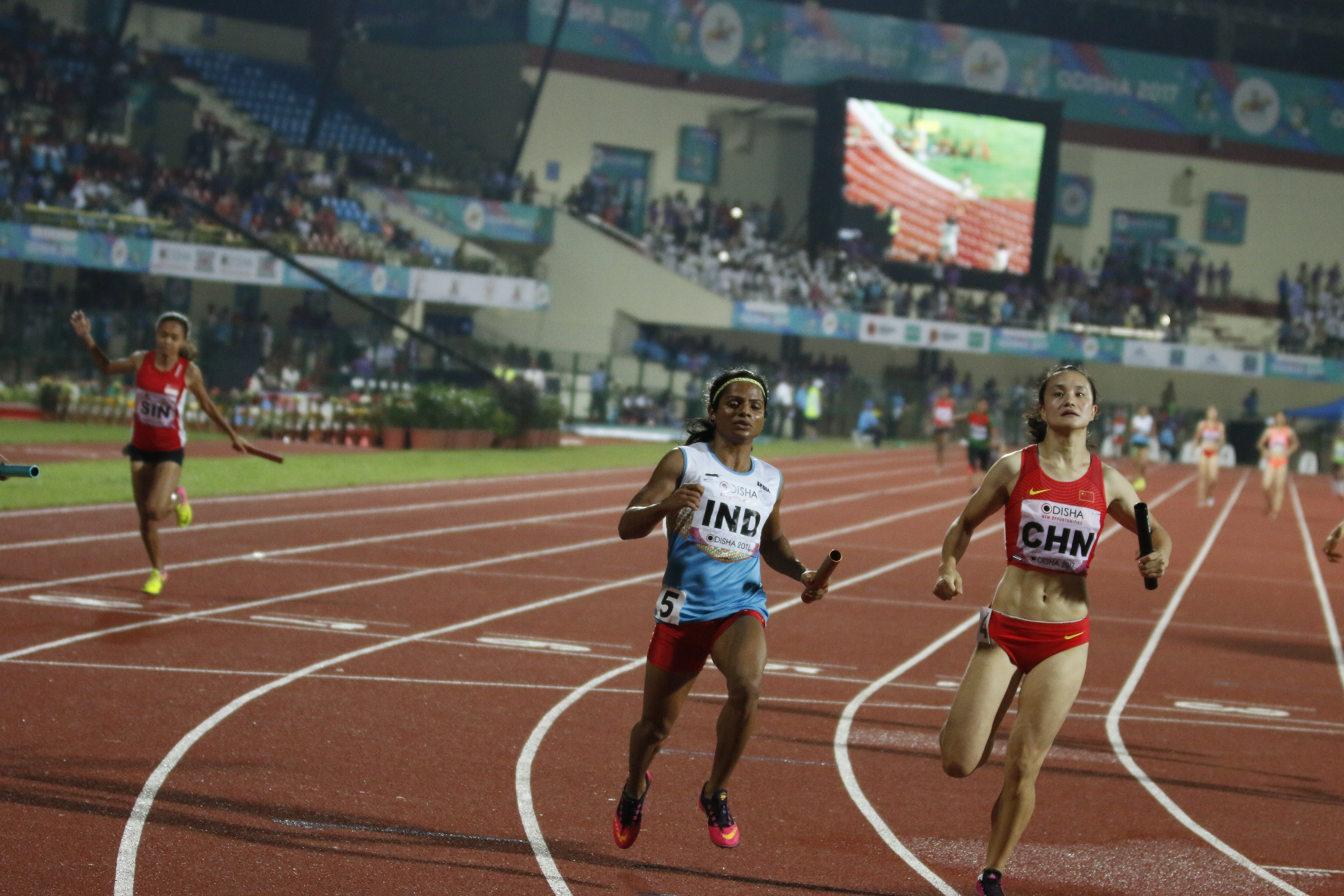
Chand in action at relay event on track in 2017.

At Rio 2016 Olympics, she became the third Indian woman to participate in the Women's 100 metres, though she did not move beyond the heats, where she clocked 11.69 seconds.

Since Rio, Chand has been training at Hyderabad with young athletes, most notable among them Indian Badminton Star P. V. Sindhu.

In 2016, Chief Minister Naveen Patnaik appointed Chand as assistant manager of Odisha Mining Corporation, explaining that the government's decision to directly employ athletes was to reward their achievements and provide them with financial stability.

=== 2017−2019 ===
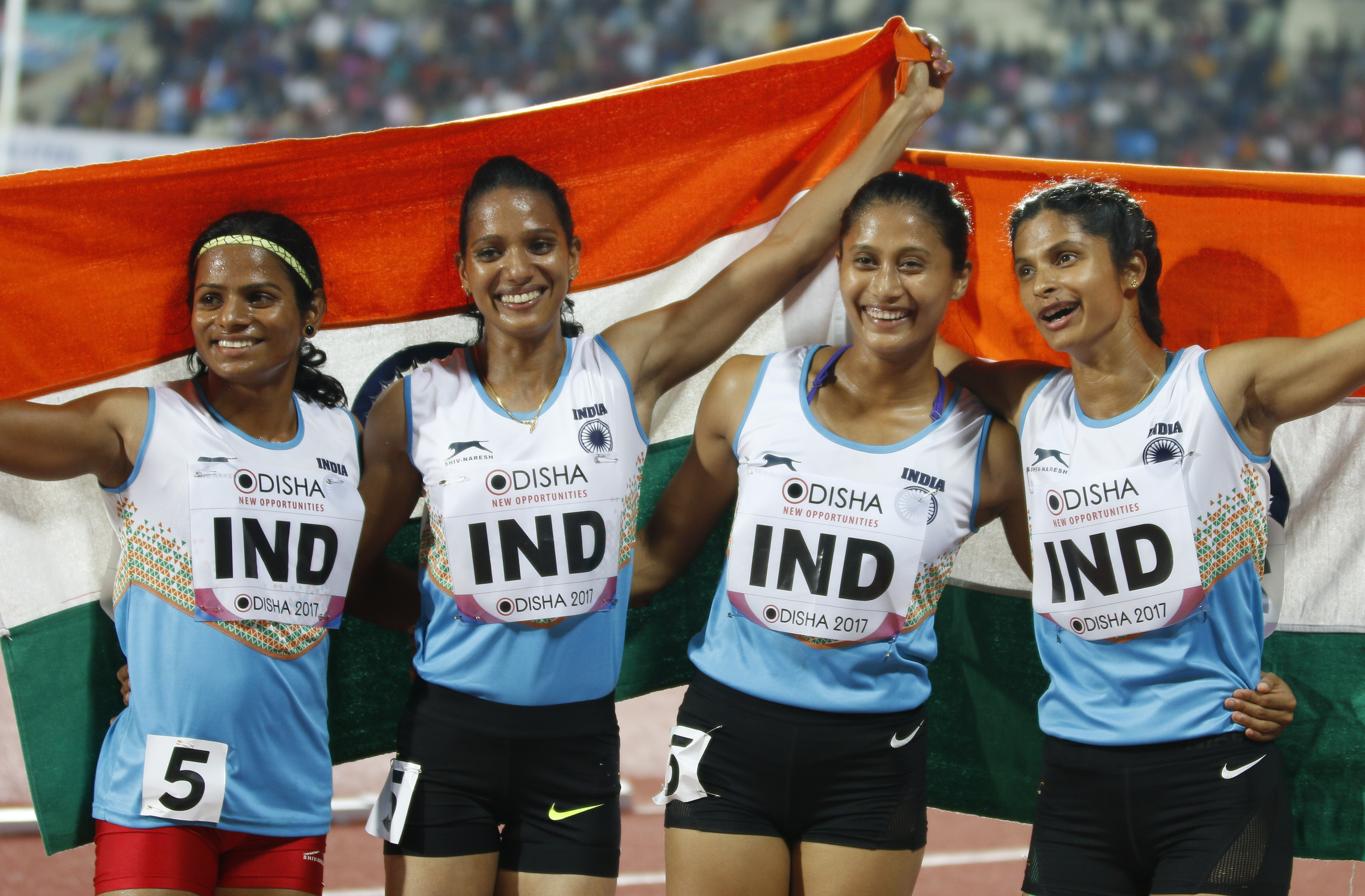
Chand (left) with the Indian 4 × 100 m team at the 2017 Asian Championships

In 2017, at the Asian Athletics Championships she clinched two bronze medals, one in the Women's 100 metres, another in the Women's 4 × 100 m relay with Srabani Nanda, Merlin K Joseph, and Himashree Roy at Bhubaneswar. At the 2018 Asian Games in Jakarta, Chand in the Women's 100 metres finals, won the silver medal, her first Asian games medal, clocking 11.32 seconds on 26 August. Again on 29 August, she bagged her second silver at the Asian games in the Women's 200 metres final. Her silver in 100 m, was India's silver medal in this category after 32 years since P.T.Usha won in 1986 and Chand's first medal in the Asian games as she was banned in 2014 and her 200 m silver is after 16 years for India since Saraswati Saha's gold in 2002 at Busan.

As she won these two medals after a long court battle, she expressed her concern about her future saying, "My legal team helped me to come back. But nobody could guarantee what will happen in the future." Citing Caster Semenya's ongoing fight, she said, "Caster Semenya is still fighting. There is always fear but you need to overcome it."

At the 2019 Summer Universiade in Napoli, Chand won gold in the 100m race, becoming the first Indian woman sprinter to win gold at the Universiade. She finished the sprint in 11.32 seconds. She was also the flag-bearer during the opening ceremony of the event.

In August 2019, prominent sportswear brand Puma signed Chand for two years to endorse their products.

=== 2021–2024 ===
In 2021 Chandra competed at the delayed Tokyo 2020 Olympic Games in the Women's 100m and 200m events, having qualified due to her world rankings as she did not meet the events' entry requirements (minimum times). In the initial heats she posted times of 11.54 and 23.85 seconds, respectively, well outside of the range required to progress to the semi-final rounds.

She was one of the athletes whose cases were profiled in Phyllis Ellis's 2022 documentary film Category: Woman.

On 18 January 2023 it was announced that Chand had tested positive for three different prohibited substances.

In 2024 Chand announced her decision to retire from sport after the 2024 Paris Olympics. She explained: "I'm growing old, I'm not as fast as I used to be".

== International competitions ==
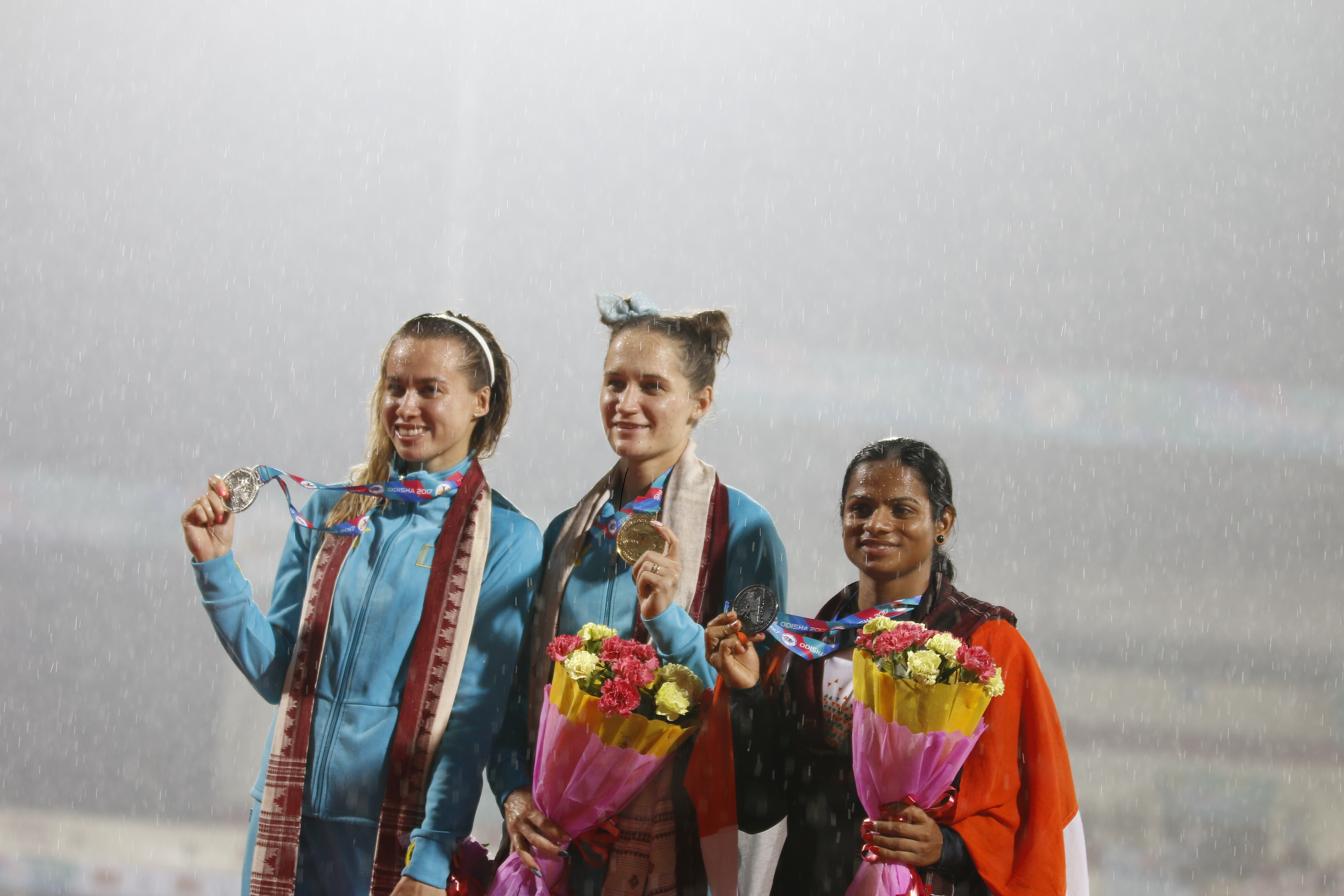
Chand (right) on podium after winning bronze at the 2017 Asian Championships.

Representing India
Year	Competition	Venue	Position	Event	Notes
Outdoor competition
2013	World Youth Championships in Athletics	Donetsk, Ukraine	6th	100 m	11.71 sec
2013	Asian Athletics Championships	Pune, India	3rd place, bronze medalist(s)	200 m	23.811 sec
2014	Asian Junior Athletics Championships	Taipei, Taiwan	1st place, gold medalist(s)	200 m	23.74 sec
2014	Asian Junior Athletics Championships	Taipei, Taiwan	1st place, gold medalist(s)	4 × 400 m relay	3.40.53 min
2016	XXVI G Kosanov Memorial	Almaty, Kazakhstan	NR	100 m	11.24 sec
2016	Rio Olympics(Heat 5)	Jakarta, Indonesia	H5–7th	100 m	11.69 sec
2017	Asian Athletics Championships	Bhubaneswar, India	3rd place, bronze medalist(s)	100 m	11.52 sec
2017	Asian Athletics Championships	Bhubaneswar, India	3rd place, bronze medalist(s)	4 × 100 m relay	44.57 sec
2017	World Championships in Athletics (Heat)	London, UK	H5–5th	100 m	12.07 sec
2018	Asian Games	Jakarta, Indonesia	2nd place, silver medalist(s)	100 m	11.32 s
2018	Asian Games	Jakarta, Indonesia	SF1–1st PB	200 m	23.00 s
2018	Asian Games	Jakarta, Indonesia	2nd place, silver medalist(s)	200 m	23.20 s
2019	Asian Athletics Championships	Doha, Qatar	H4−1st NR	100 m	11.28 sec
2019	Asian Athletics Championships	Doha, Qatar	SF NR	100 m	11.26 sec
2019	Asian Athletics Championships	Doha, Qatar	FL−5th	100 m	11.44 sec
2019	Asian Athletics Championships	Doha, Qatar	3rd place, bronze medalist(s)	200 m	23.24 sec
2019	XXX Summer Universiade	Naples, Italy	1st place, gold medalist(s)	100 m	11.32 sec
Indoor Competition
2016	Asian Indoor Athletics Championships	Doha, Qatar	H−1st NR	60 m	7.28 s
2016	Asian Indoor Athletics Championships	Doha, Qatar	3rd place, bronze medalist(s)	60 m	7.37 s
2016	IAAF World Indoor Championships	Portland, US	H5–5th	60 m	7.30 s
2016	IAAF World Indoor Championships	Portland, US	SF3–8th	60 m	7.62 s

Legend

- H − Heats/qualification rounds
- SF − Semi-finals
- FL − Finals
- NR − National record
- PB − Personal best

== Awards and honours ==
- ₹3 crore (equivalent to ₹4.4 crore or US$450,000 in 2026) from the Government of Odisha for winning two silver medals at the 2018 Asian Games.
- Arjuna Award (2020)

== Personal life ==
In 2019, Chand became India's first athlete to openly come out as a member of the LGBTQ+ community, as she publicly revealed that she was in a same-sex relationship. Chand stated that the 2018 Indian Supreme Court decision to decriminalize gay sex empowered her to speak openly about her sexuality. Chand's announcement was met with mixed reactions. While she received widespread support on social media and from the LGBTQ+ community, she also faced severe backlash from her home village, where residents disavowed her remarks and called them "humiliating". Her eldest sister threatened to expel her from the family.

== See also ==
- Rashmi Rocket, Indian sports drama film about sex verification in sports
- Caster Semenya
- Santhi Soundarajan
- Maria José Martínez-Patiño
