= Olga Safronova =

Kazakhstani sprinter (born 1991)

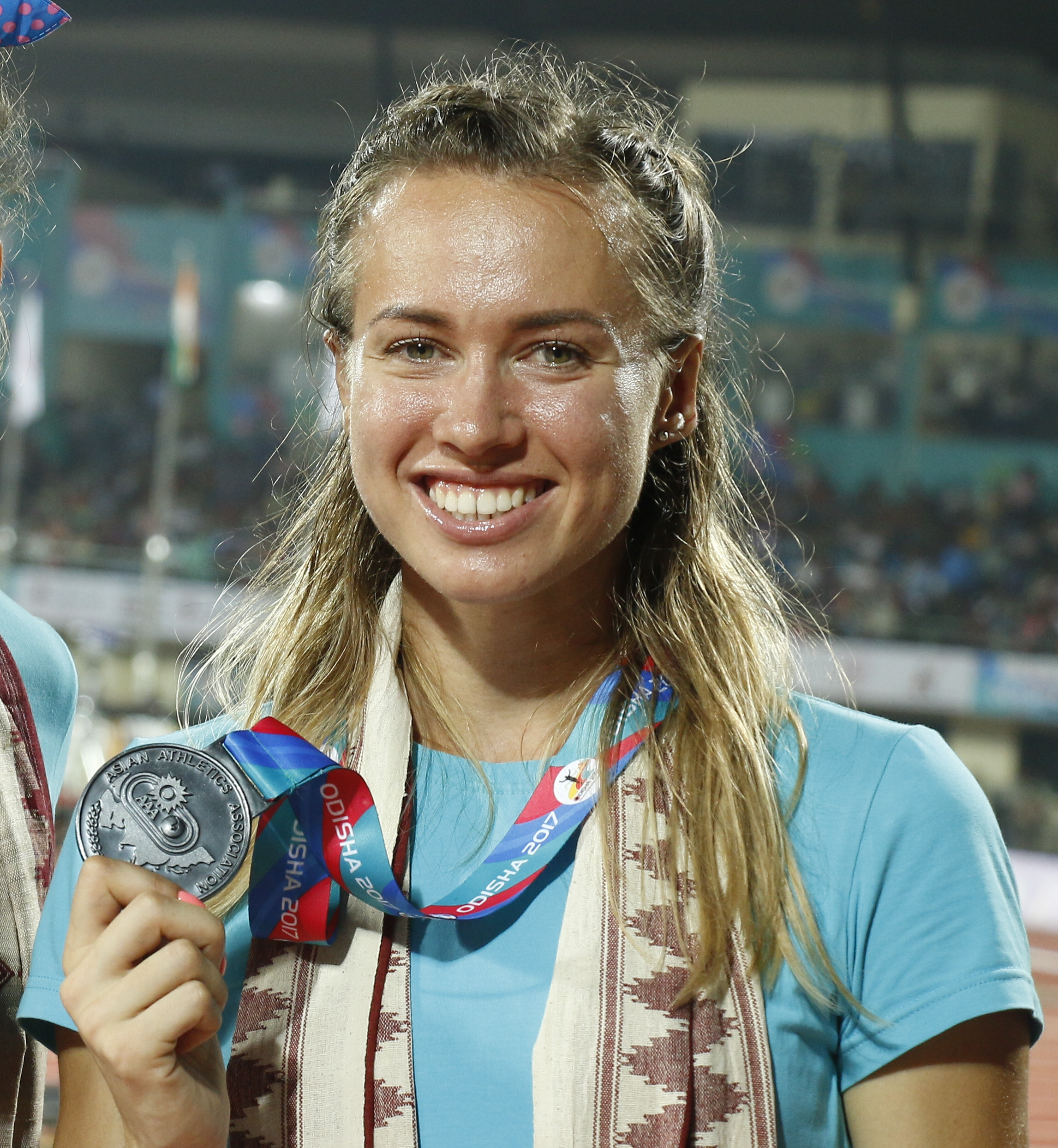
- Safronova at the 2017 Asian Championships

Personal information
- Born: 5 November 1991 (age 34) Karaganda, Kazakh SSR, Soviet Union
- Education: Karaganda State University
- Height: 1.72 m (5 ft 8 in)
- Weight: 65 kg (143 lb)

Sport
- Coached by: Yury Mashtakov; Alexander Denisko (personal)

Achievements and titles
- Olympic finals: London 2012 (semifinals)
- Personal best(s): 100 m – 11.09 (2016); 200 m – 22.85 (2014)
Medal record
Women's athletics
Representing Kazakhstan
Asian Games
Gold medal – first place	2014 Incheon	200 m
Silver medal – second place	2014 Incheon	4x100 m
Bronze medal – third place	2014 Incheon	100 m
Bronze medal – third place	2018 Jakarta-Palembang	4x100 m
Asian Indoor Championships
Silver medal – second place	2010 Tehran	4×400 m
Silver medal – second place	2014 Hangzhou	60 m
Silver medal – second place	2023 Astana	60 m
Silver medal – second place	2024 Tehran	60 m
Bronze medal – third place	2010 Tehran	60 m

Olga Safronova (Ольга Сафронова; born 5 November 1991), née Bludova (Блудова), is a Kazakhstani sprinter. She competed in the 100 m event at the 2012 Summer Olympics and advanced to the semifinals. At the 2016 Summer Olympics she was eliminated in the heats of the 100 m, 200 m and 4 × 100 m events. At the 2010 Asian Indoor Athletics Championships, she won a bronze medal in the 60 m and a silver at the 4 × 400 m relay. Safronova won four medals at the Asian Games in 2014–2018, two individual and two in the 4 × 100 m relay.

Her mother Irina was a hurdler, her brother Maxim is a high jumper. Her husband Konstantin Safronov competed internationally in the long jump.

== Competition record ==
Year	Competition	Venue	Position	Event	Notes
Representing Kazakhstan
2008	World Junior Championships	Bydgoszcz, Poland	57th (h)	100m	12.57
2008	World Junior Championships	Bydgoszcz, Poland	48th (h)	200m	25.55
2010	Asian Indoor Championships	Tehran, Iran	3rd	60 m	7.57
2010	Asian Indoor Championships	Tehran, Iran	2nd	4 × 400 m relay	3:44.20
2010	Asian Junior Championships	Hanoi, Vietnam	2nd	100 m	12.17
2010	Asian Games	Guangzhou, China	10th (sf)	100 m	11.87
2010	Asian Games	Guangzhou, China	–	4 × 100 m relay	DNF
2011	Asian Championships	Kobe, Japan	7th	100 m	11.82
2011	Asian Championships	Kobe, Japan	4th	200 m	24.29
2011	Universiade	Shenzhen, China	18th (qf)	100 m	11.88
2011	Universiade	Shenzhen, China	22nd (qf)	200 m	24.32
2011	World Championships	Daegu, South Korea	37th (h)	100 m	11.62
2012	Asian Indoor Championships	Hangzhou, China	4th	60 m	7.49
2012	World Indoor Championships	Istanbul, Turkey	26th (h)	60 m	7.45
2012	Olympic Games	London, United Kingdom	24th (sf)	100 m	11.39
2013	Universiade	Kazan, Russia	7th	100 m	11.55
2013	Universiade	Kazan, Russia	14th (sf)	200 m	23.95
2013	World Championships	Moscow, Russia	35th (h)	200 m	23.83
2014	Asian Indoor Championships	Hangzhou, China	2nd	60 m	7.41
2014	World Indoor Championships	Sopot, Poland	24th (h)	60 m	7.35
2014	Asian Games	Incheon, South Korea	3rd	100 m	11.50
2014	Asian Games	Incheon, South Korea	1st	200 m	23.02
2014	Asian Games	Incheon, South Korea	2nd	4 × 100 m relay	43.90
2015	Asian Championships	Wuhan, China	4th	100 m	11.47
2015	Asian Championships	Wuhan, China	–	4 × 100 m relay	DQ
2015	World Championships	Beijing, China	37th (h)	100 m	11.49
2015	World Championships	Beijing, China	32nd (h)	200 m	23.28
2016	Olympic Games	Rio de Janeiro, Brazil	36th (h)	100 m	11.50
2016	Olympic Games	Rio de Janeiro, Brazil	41st (h)	200 m	23.29
2016	Olympic Games	Rio de Janeiro, Brazil	–	4 × 100 m relay	DQ
2017	Asian Championships	Bhubaneswar, India	2nd	100 m	11.45
2017	Asian Championships	Bhubaneswar, India	3rd	200 m	23.47
2017	Asian Championships	Bhubaneswar, India	1st	4 × 100 m relay	43.53
2017	World Championships	London, United Kingdom	13th (h)	4 × 100 m relay	45.47
2017	Universiade	Taipei, Taiwan	7th	100 m	11.53
2017	Universiade	Taipei, Taiwan	6th	200 m	23.80
2017	Universiade	Taipei, Taiwan	2nd (h)	4 × 100 m relay	44.14^{1}
2017	Asian Indoor and Martial Arts Games	Ashgabat, Turkmenistan	3rd	60 m	7.43
2018	Asian Games	Jakarta, Indonesia	6th	100 m	11.43
2018	Asian Games	Jakarta, Indonesia	5th	200 m	23.43
2018	Asian Games	Jakarta, Indonesia	3rd	4 × 100 m relay	43.82
2019	Asian Championships	Doha, Qatar	1st	100 m	11.17
2019	Asian Championships	Doha, Qatar	2nd	200 m	22.87
2019	Asian Championships	Doha, Qatar	2nd	4 × 100 m relay	43.36
2019	World Relays	Yokohama, Japan	8th (h)	4 × 100 m relay	43.71
2019	World Championships	Doha, Qatar	31st (h)	100 m	11.40
2019	World Championships	Doha, Qatar	25th (h)	200 m	23.16
2019	World Championships	Doha, Qatar	12th (h)	4 × 100 m relay	43.79
2021	Olympic Games	Tokyo, Japan	36th (h)	200 m	23.64
2022	World Championships	Eugene, United States	41st (h)	100 m	11.65
2022	World Championships	Eugene, United States	37th (h)	200 m	23.50
2022	Islamic Solidarity Games	Konya, Turkey	7th	100 m	11.37
2022	Islamic Solidarity Games	Konya, Turkey	5th (sf)	200 m	23.29^{2}
2023	Asian Indoor Championships	Astana, Kazakhstan	2nd	60 m	7.32
2023	Asian Championships	Bangkok, Thailand	6th	200 m	23.63
2023	Asian Championships	Bangkok, Thailand	6th (h)	4 × 100 m relay	45.89^{1}
2023	Asian Games	Hangzhou, China	4th	200 m	23.67
2024	Asian Indoor Championships	Tehran, Iran	2nd	60 m	7.35
2024	Olympic Games	Paris, France	23rd (rep)	200 m	23.70
2025	Asian Championships	Gumi, South Korea	8th (h)	100 m	11.73
2025	Asian Championships	Gumi, South Korea	9th (h)	200 m	24.37
2026	Asian Indoor Championships	Tianjin, China	15th (h)	60 m	7.71

^{1}Disqualified in the final
^{2}Did not finish in the final
