= Rima Kashafutdinova =

Kazakhstani sprinter (born 1995)

Personal information
- Born: 24 July 1995 (age 30) Satbayev, Kazakhstan
- Height: 1.60 m (5 ft 3 in)
- Weight: 48 kg (106 lb)

Sport
- Country: Kazakhstan
- Sport: Track and field
- Event(s): 100 metres 4 × 100m relay

Rima Ilfatovna Kashafutdinova (Kazakh: Ри́ма Ильфа́товна Кашафутди́нова; born 24 July 1995) is a Kazakhstani sprinter. She competed in the women's 100 metres and 4 × 100 metres relay event at the 2016 Summer Olympics. She, Olga Safronova, Viktoriya Zyabkina and Merjen Ishanguliyeva were the winning 100m relay team who took the gold medals at the 2017 Asian Athletics Championships in Bhubaneswar.
