= Hu Chia-chen =

Taiwanese sprinter (born 1997)

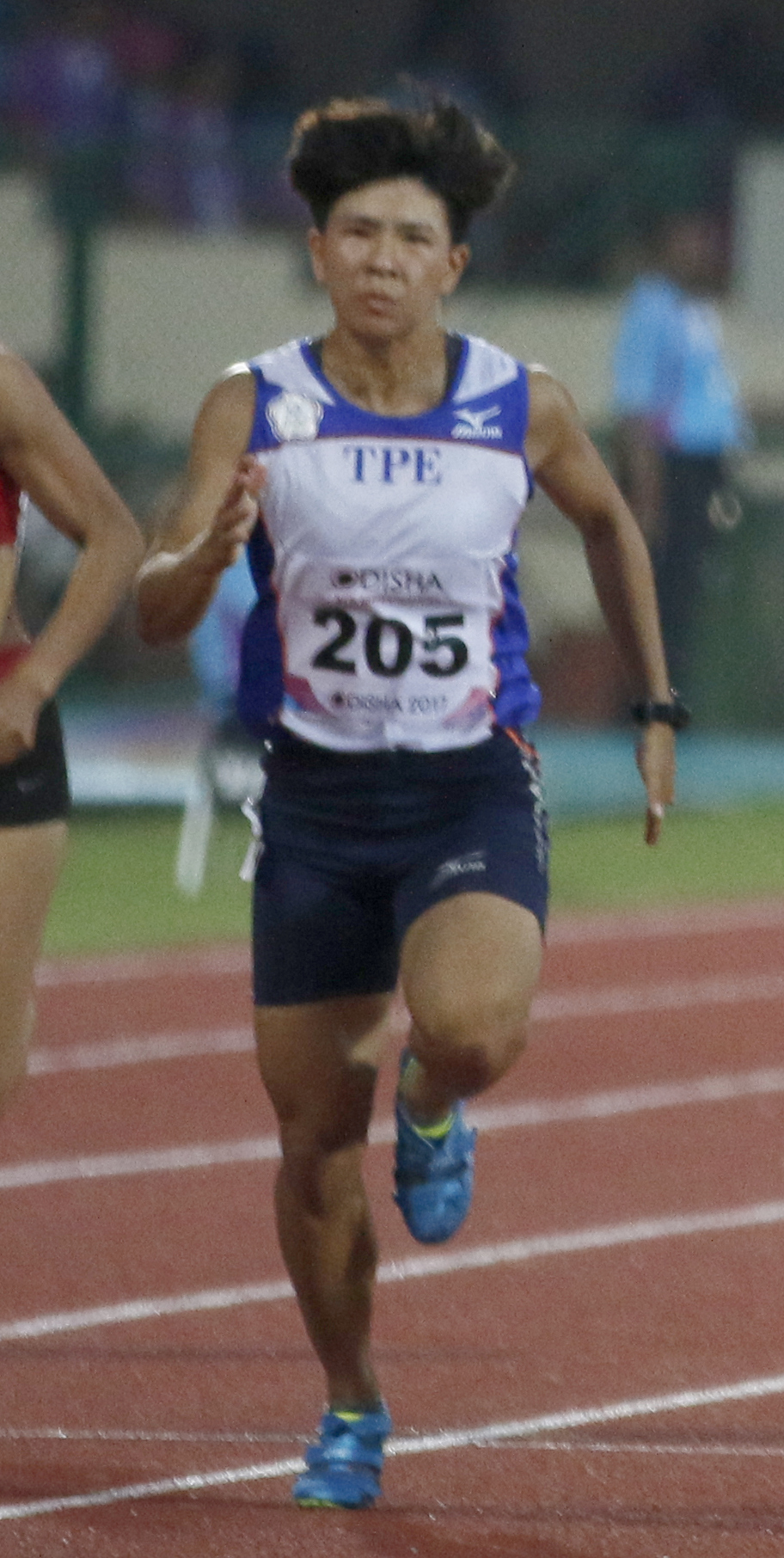
- Hu at the 2017 Asian Championships

Personal information
- Native name: 胡家蓁
- Born: 28 March 1997 (age 29)
- Education: Kaohsiung Normal University
- Height: 160 cm (5 ft 3 in)
- Weight: 55 kg (121 lb)

Sport
- Sport: Athletics
- Event(s): 100 m, 200 m
- Coached by: Xu Tanghan (club)

Achievements and titles
- Personal best(s): 100 m – 11.65 (2017); 200 m – 24.77 (2018)

Hu Chia-chen (Chinese: 胡家蓁; born 28 March 1997) is a sprinter from Taiwan. She placed sixth and seventh in the 4 × 100 m relay at the 2014 and 2018 Asian Games respectively.
