= Kong Lingwei =

Chinese sprinter (born 1995)

Personal information
- Born: 28 July 1995 (age 30) Boli, Heilongjiang
- Height: 1.65 m (5 ft 5 in)
- Weight: 55 kg (121 lb)

Chinese name
- Chinese: 孔令微
- Hanyu Pinyin: Kǒng Lìngwěi

Sport
- Country: China
- Sport: female sprinter
Medal record
Asian Games
| Gold medal – first place | 2014 Incheon | 4 × 100 metres relay |
National Games of China
| Silver medal – second place | 2013 Shenyang | 200 m |

Kong Lingwei (Chinese: 孔令微; pinyin: Kǒng Lìngwěi; born 28 July 1995 in Boli, Qitaihe) is a Chinese female sprinter, the goldlist for 4 × 100 metres relay title at 2014 Asian Games in Incheon. Setting an Asian record of female 4 × 200 metres relay in result of 1:34.89, she ranked the 4th for 200 metres relay at 2015 IAAF World Relays in Bahamas.
