= Nigina Sharipova =

Uzbekistani sprinter (born 1995)

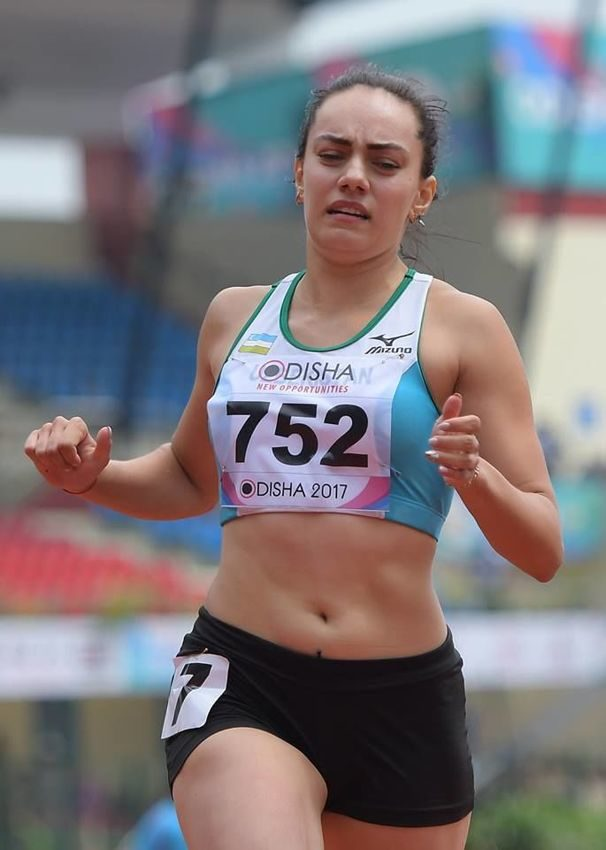

Personal information
- Born: 10 August 1995 (age 31) Bukhara, Uzbekistan

Sport
- Country: Uzbekistan
- Sport: Track and field
- Event: 100 metres

Achievements and titles
- Personal bests: 100 m: 11.31; 200 m: 23.17; 400 m: 56.29

Nigina Shavkatovna Sharipova (Uzbek: Нигина Шавкатовна Шарипова; born 10 August 1995) is an Uzbekistani sprinter. She competed in the women's 100 metres event at the 2016 Summer Olympics. In 2017, she won the silver medal in the 100 and bronze in the 200 metres at the Islamic Solidarity Games in Baku, Azerbaijan. She also represented Uzbekistan in the 2017 Asian Indoor and Martial Arts Games competing in the Indoor athletics event.

In 2019, at the Asian Athletics Championships in Doha (Qatar), at a distance of 100 meters with a score of 11.41 seconds, she again took only fourth place, losing bronze to the Chinese Wei Yongli.
