= Athletics at the 2026 Asian Games – Women's 4 × 100 metres relay =

Women's 4 × 100 metres relay at the 2026 Asian Games
- Venue: Nagoya City Mizuho Park Athletics Stadium
- Date: 27–28 September 2026
- Competitors: 46 from 11 nations

Medalists
gold medal	Liang Xiaojing; Liu Guoyi; Liu Xiajun; Chen Yujie	China
silver medal	Manatsada Sanmano; Sukanda Petraksa; Supanich Poolkerd; Jirapat Khanonta	Thailand
bronze medal	Masumi Aoki; Manaka Miura; Aiko Iki; Midori Mikase	Japan

The women's 4 × 100 metres relay competition at the 2026 Asian Games took place on 27 and 28 September 2026 at the Nagoya City Mizuho Park Athletics Stadium in Nagoya, Japan.

China's Liang Xiaojing, Liu Guoyi, Liu Xiajun and Chen Yujie won the gold medal in 42.96 seconds, defending the title China had won at the 2022 Games. Thailand took silver in a season-best 43.51 seconds, while Japan claimed the bronze in 43.52 seconds, also a season best.

== Schedule ==
All times are Japan Standard Time (UTC+09:00)

Schedule
Date	Time	Event
Sunday, 27 September 2026	21:45	Round 1 (Heat 1)
Sunday, 27 September 2026	21:55	Round 1 (Heat 2)
Monday, 28 September 2026	22:04	Final

== Records ==
Prior to this competition, the existing world, Asian and Games records were as follows.

World Record	United States	40.82	London, Great Britain	8 October 2012
Asian Record	China	42.23	Shanghai, China	23 October 1997
Games Record	Bahrain	42.73	Jakarta, Indonesia	30 August 2018

== Results ==
Legend

- Q — Qualified by place
- q — Qualified by time
- L — Lane infringement
- SB — Season best
- DQ — Disqualified
- DNF — Did not finish

=== Qualification ===
First three in each heat (Q) and next two fastest (q) advanced to the final.

==== Heat 1 ====
Rank	Team	Time	Notes
1	China (CHN); Liang Xiaojing; Liu Guoyi; Liu Xiajun; Zhu Junying	43.63	Q
2	Thailand (THA); Manatsada Sanmano; Sukanda Petraksa; Supanich Poolkerd; Jirapat Khanonta	43.65 (.646)	Q SB
3	Vietnam (VIE); Hà Thị Thu; Hoàng Du Y Phùng Thị Huệ; Lê Thị Cẩm Tú	44.06	Q SB
4	Singapore (SGP); Amanda Loo; Elizabeth Tan; Kerstin Ong; Shanti Pereira	45.12	SB
5	Malaysia (MAS); Fatin Ilyana Mat Nayan; Izzatul Musfirah; Nurul Mohd; Nur Aling	45.24	L TR17.3.3 SB

==== Heat 2 ====
Rank	Team	Time	Notes
1	India (IND); Tamanna; Sneha Sathyanarayana; Sudeshna Shivankar; Abinaya Rajarajan	43.65 (.648)	Q SB
2	Japan (JPN); Masumi Aoki; Manaka Miura; Aiko Iki; Midori Mikase	43.65 (.650)	Q
3	Philippines (PHI); Jessica Rose Laurance; Naomi Johnson; Lianne Diana Pama; Zion Rose Nelson	43.88	Q NR
4	Bahrain (BRN); Layla Kamal; Edidiong Odiong; Hajar Alkhaldi; Raihanah Garoubah	44.42	q SB
5	South Korea (KOR); Kim Myeong-ji; Kim Ju-ha; Seo Ji-hyun; Kim Seo-yoon	44.94	q SB
—	Hong Kong (HKG); Chan Pui-kei; Chloe Pak; Luo Tsz-yuen; Yu Pui-yi	DQ	TR24.7

=== Final ===
Rank	Team	Time	Notes
1st place, gold medalist(s)	China (CHN); Liang Xiaojing; Liu Guoyi; Liu Xiajun; Chen Yujie	42.96	
2nd place, silver medalist(s)	Thailand (THA); Manatsada Sanmano; Sukanda Petraksa; Supanich Poolkerd; Jirapat Khanonta	43.51	SB
3rd place, bronze medalist(s)	Japan (JPN); Masumi Aoki; Manaka Miura; Aiko Iki; Midori Mikase	43.52	SB
4	India (IND); Tamanna; Sneha Sathyanarayana; Sudeshna Shivankar; Abinaya Rajarajan	43.57	SB
5	Philippines (PHI); Jessica Rose Laurance; Naomi Johnson; Lianne Diana Pama; Zion Rose Nelson	43.60	NR
6	Vietnam (VIE); Hà Thị Thu; Hoàng Du Y Phùng Thị Huệ; Lê Thị Cẩm Tú	44.28	
7	South Korea (KOR); Kim Myeong-ji; Kim Ju-ha; Seo Ji-hyun; Kim Seo-yoon	44.81	SB
—	Bahrain (BRN); Hajar Alkhaldi; Edidiong Odiong; Raihanah Garoubah; Salwa Naser	DNF	
