= 2025 Asian Athletics Championships – Women's 4 × 100 metres relay =

Women's 4 × 100 metres relay at the 2025 Asian Athletics Championships
- Venue: Gumi Civic Stadium
- Location: Gumi, South Korea
- Dates: 31 May
- Competitors: 28 from 7 nations
- Winning time: 43.28

Medalists
gold medal	Chen Yujie; Li Yuting; Zhu Junying; Liang Xiaojing	China
silver medal	Srabani Nanda; S.S Sneha; Abinaya Rajarajan; Nithya Gandhe	India
bronze medal	Jirapat Khanonta; Supanich Poolkerd; Sukanda Petraksa; Athicha Phetkun	Thailand

The women's 4 × 100 metres relay event at the 2025 Asian Athletics Championships was held on 31 May.

== Schedule ==
The event schedule, in local time (UTC+9), was as follows:

Date	Time	Round
31 May	19:35	Results

== Results ==
Place	Nation	Athletes	Time	Notes
1st place, gold medalist(s)	China	Chen Yujie; Li Yuting; Zhu Junying; Liang Xiaojing	43.28	SB
2nd place, silver medalist(s)	India	Srabani Nanda; S.S Sneha; Abinaya Rajarajan; Nithya Gandhe	43.86	SB
3rd place, bronze medalist(s)	Thailand	Jirapat Khanonta; Supanich Poolkerd; Sukanda Petraksa; Athicha Phetkun	44.26	PB
4	South Korea	Eun-bin Lee; Da-seul Kang; So-eun Kim; Kim Dae-un	44.45	NR
5	Singapore	Shannon Tan; Elizabeth-Ann Tan; Shanti Pereira; Laavinia Jaiganth	44.66	NR
6	Malaysia	Azreen Nabila Alias; Zaidatul Husniah Zulkifli; Nur Afrina Batrisyia; Nur Aishah Rofina Aling	44.75	
7	Hong Kong	Chan Pui Kei; Chloe Pak; Serena Tang Cheuk Man; Kong Chun Ki	44.88	NR
