= Athletics at the 2026 Asian Games – Women's 100 metres =

Women's 100 metres at the 2026 Asian Games
- Venue: Mizuho Park Athletic Stadium, Nagoya
- Dates: 24 September 2026 (round 1); 25 September 2026 (semi-finals and final)
- Competitors: 28 from 18 nations
- Winning time: 11.06 s GR

Medalists
gold medal	Chen Yujie	China
silver medal	Shanti Pereira	Singapore
bronze medal	Edidiong Odiong	Bahrain

The women's 100 metres competition at the 2026 Asian Games took place from 24 to 25 September 2026 at the Mizuho Park Athletic Stadium in Nagoya, Japan.

== Schedule ==
All times are Japan Standard Time (UTC+09:00)

Schedule
Date	Time	Event
24 September 2026	16:03	Round 1
25 September 2026	15:43	Semi-finals
25 September 2026	18:40	Final

== Records ==
Prior to this competition, the existing world, Asian and Games records were as follows.

World Record	Florence Griffith-Joyner (USA)	10.49	Indianapolis, United States	15 July 1988
Asian Record	Li Xuemei (CHN)	10.79	Shanghai, China	17 October 1997
Games Record	Susanthika Jayasinghe (SRI)	11.15	Busan, South Korea	7 October 2002

== Results ==
=== Round 1 ===
First three in each heat (Q) and next four fastest (q) advanced to the semi-finals.

==== Heat 1 ====
Place	Lane	Athlete	Nation	Time	Notes
1	4	Chen Yujie	China	11.41	Q
2	5	Shanti Pereira	Singapore	11.43	Q
3	6	Sukanda Petraksa	Thailand	11.54	Q
4	3	Jessica Rose Laurance	Philippines	11.62	q
5	2	Aziza Sbaity	Lebanon	11.89	q
6	7	Laylo Allaberganova	Uzbekistan	11.93	
7	8	Valentina Meredova	Turkmenistan	12.19	
				Wind: (−0.4 m/s)	

==== Heat 2 ====
Place	Lane	Athlete	Nation	Time	Notes
1	5	Jirapat Khanonta	Thailand	11.45	Q, PB
2	4	Midori Mikase	Japan	11.59	Q
3	8	Zion Corrales-Nelson	Philippines	11.68	Q
4	6	Elizabeth-Ann Tan	Singapore	11.79	q
5	7	Pui Yi Yu	Hong Kong	11.93	
6	3	Mudhawi Al-Shammari	Kuwait	12.09	
7	2	Marwa Saleem	Afghanistan	13.48	
				Wind: (−0.2 m/s)	

==== Heat 3 ====
Place	Lane	Athlete	Nation	Time	Notes
1	4	Edidiong Odiong	Bahrain	11.48	Q
2	5	Liao Yanjun	Chinese Taipei	11.70	Q
3	7	Seo Ji-hyun	South Korea	11.83	Q, PB
4	6	Chan Pui Kei	Hong Kong	11.83	q
5	8	Faiqa Riaz	Pakistan	11.96	PB
6	3	Hibah Mohammed	Saudi Arabia	12.02	NR
7	2	Mazoon Al Alawi	Oman	12.02	
				Wind: (−0.5 m/s)	

==== Heat 4 ====
Place	Lane	Athlete	Nation	Time	Notes
1	4	Raihanah Garoubah	Bahrain	11.44	Q, PB
2	5	Abigail Fuka Ido	Japan	11.59	Q
3	7	Kim Ju-ha	South Korea	11.73	Q, PB
4	2	Ge Manqi	China	12.13	
5	6	Loi Im Lan	Macau	12.21	
6	8	Ser-Od Nomin-Od	Mongolia	12.65	
7	3	Mayyasah Al Thikr Allah	Saudi Arabia	12.81	
				Wind: (+0.2 m/s)	

=== Semi-finals ===
First three in each heat (Q) and next two fastest (q) advanced to the final.

==== Heat 1 ====
Place	Lane	Athlete	Nation	Time	Notes
1	4	Shanti Pereira	Singapore	11.28	Q
2	6	Edidiong Odiong	Bahrain	11.33	Q
3	3	Sukanda Petraksa	Thailand	11.47	Q
4	2	Jessica Laurance	Philippines	11.57	q
5	7	Abigail Fuka Ido	Japan	11.64	
6	5	Liao Yanjun	Chinese Taipei	11.75	
7	9	Aziza Sbaity	Lebanon	11.81	
8	8	Jihyun Seo	South Korea	11.85	
				Wind: (±0.0 m/s)	

==== Heat 2 ====
Place	Lane	Athlete	Nation	Time	Notes
1	5	Jirapat Khanonta	Thailand	11.41	Q, PB
2	7	Chen Yujie	China	11.41	Q
3	6	Midori Mikase	Japan	11.43	Q
4	4	Raihanah Garoubah	Bahrain	11.45	q
5	3	Zion Corrales-Nelson	Philippines	11.63	
6	8	Kim Ju-ha	South Korea	11.68	PB
7	2	Elizabeth-Ann Tan	Singapore	11.72	
8	9	Chan Pui Kei	Hong Kong	11.86	
				Wind: (±0.0 m/s)	

=== Final ===
Place	Lane	Athlete	Nation	Time	Notes
1st place, gold medalist(s)	5	Chen Yujie	China	11.06	GR, AU20R
2nd place, silver medalist(s)	4	Shanti Pereira	Singapore	11.21	SB
3rd place, bronze medalist(s)	7	Edidiong Odiong	Bahrain	11.33	
4	8	Midori Mikase	Japan	11.43	
5	6	Jirapat Khanonta	Thailand	11.46	
6	3	Sukanda Petraksa	Thailand	11.48	
7	9	Raihanah Garoubah	Bahrain	11.53	
8	2	Jessica Laurance	Philippines	11.58	
				Wind: (±0.0 m/s)	
