= 2023 Asian Athletics Championships – Women's 4 × 100 metres relay =

Women's 4 × 100 metres relay at the 2023 Asian Athletics Championships
- Venue: National Stadium
- Location: Bangkok, Thailand
- Dates: 12 July (heats); 13 July (final)
- Nations: 9
- Winning time: 43.35

Medalists
gold medal	Liang Xiaojing; Wei Yongli; Yuan Qiqi; Ge Manqi	China
silver medal	Miu Kurashige; Arisa Kimishima; Remi Tsuruta; Midori Mikase; Shuri Aono*	Japan
bronze medal	Supawan Thipat; Supanich Poolkerd; On-Uma Chattha; Athicha Petchakul	Thailand

The women's 4 × 100 metres relay event at the 2023 Asian Athletics Championships was held on 12 and 13 July.

== Results ==
=== Heats ===
Qualification rule: First 3 in each heat (Q) and the next 2 fastest (q) qualified for the final.

Rank	Heat	Nation	Athletes	Time	Notes
1	2	China	Liang Xiaojing, Wei Yongli, Yuan Qiqi, Ge Manqi	43.86	Q
2	1	Japan	Miu Kurashige, Shuri Aono, Remi Tsuruta, Midori Mikase	44.51	Q
3	1	Thailand	Supawan Thipat, Supanich Poolkerd, On-Uma Chattha, Athicha Petchakul	44.87	Q
4	1	Hong Kong	Luo Tsz Yuen, Leung Kwan Yi, Tsz To Li, Kong Chun Ki	45.49	Q
5	1	Singapore	Shanti Pereira, Elizabeth-Ann Tan, Roxanne Rose Zulueta Enriquez, Bernice Liew Yee Ling	45.87	q
6	2	Kazakhstan	Arina Misheyeva, Rima Kashafutdinova, Yuliya Bashmanova, Olga Safronova	45.89	Q
7	2	Malaysia	Azreen Nabila Alias, Zaidatul Husniah Zulkifli, Nur Afrina Mohamad Rizal, Chelsea Evali Bopulas	46.17	Q
8	2	Uzbekistan	Lydiya Podsepkina, Kamila Mirsaliyeva, Nurkhon Ochilova, Malika Rajabova	47.01	q
9	2	Maldives	Ahnaa Nizaar, Mariyam Alhaa, Hawwa Muzna Faiz, Aishath Shaba Saleem	48.99	

=== Final ===
Rank	Lane	Team	Name	Time	Notes
1st place, gold medalist(s)	4	China	Liang Xiaojing, Wei Yongli, Yuan Qiqi, Ge Manqi	43.35	
2nd place, silver medalist(s)	6	Japan	Miu Kurashige, Arisa Kimishima, Remi Tsuruta, Midori Mikase	43.95	
3rd place, bronze medalist(s)	3	Thailand	Supawan Thipat, Supanich Poolkerd, On-Uma Chattha, Athicha Petchakul	44.56	
4	8	Hong Kong	Luo Tsz Yuen, Leung Kwan Yi, Tsz To Li, Kong Chun Ki	45.51	
5	7	Malaysia	Nurul Aliah Nor Azmi, Zaidatul Husniah Zulkifli, Nur Afrina Mohamad Rizal, Chelsea Evali Bopulas	45.56	
6	1	Singapore	Shanti Pereira, Elizabeth-Ann Tan, Roxanne Rose Zulueta Enriquez, Clara Si Hui Goh	45.60	
	2	Uzbekistan	Lydiya Podsepkina, Kamila Mirsaliyeva, Nurkhon Ochilova, Malika Rajabova	DQ	
	5	Kazakhstan	Arina Misheyeva, Rima Kashafutdinova, Yuliya Bashmanova, Olga Safronova	DQ	
