= 2023 Asian Athletics Championships – Women's 100 metres =

Women's 100 metres at the 2023 Asian Athletics Championships
- Venue: National Stadium
- Location: Bangkok, Thailand
- Dates: 13 July (heats); 14 July (semi-finals & final)
- Competitors: 28 from 18 nations
- Winning time: 11.20 NR

Medalists
gold medal	Shanti Pereira	Singapore
silver medal	Farzaneh Fasihi	Iran
bronze medal	Ge Manqi	China

The women's 100 metres event at the 2023 Asian Athletics Championships was held on 13 and 14 July.

== Records ==
Records before the 2023 Asian Athletics Championships
Record	Athlete (nation)	Time (s)	Location	Date
World record	Florence Griffith Joyner (USA)	10.49	Indianapolis, United States	16 July 1988
Asian record	Li Xuemei (CHN)	10.79	Shanghai, China	18 August 1997
Championship record	Olga Safronova (KAZ)	11.17	Doha, Qatar	22 April 2019
World leading	Shericka Jackson (JAM)	10.65	Kingston, Jamaica	7 July 2023
Asian leading	Wei Yongli (CHN)	11.24	Huangshi, China	9 June 2023

== Results ==
=== Heats ===
Held on 13 July

Qualification rule: First 3 in each heat (Q) and the next 4 fastest (q) qualified for the semifinals.

Wind:
Heat 1: -0.5 m/s, Heat 2: +0.1 m/, Heat 3: +0.6 m/s, Heat 4: +1.0 m/

Rank	Heat	Name	Nationality	Time	Notes
1	4	Hamideh Esmaeilnejad	Iran	11.33	Q, NR
2	3	Farzaneh Fasihi	Iran	11.42	Q
3	4	Ge Manqi	China	11.45	Q
4	3	Arisa Kimishima	Japan	11.46	Q
5	1	Shanti Pereira	Singapore	11.50	Q
6	3	Kristina Knott	Philippines	11.55	Q
7	3	Zaidatul Husniah Zulkifli	Malaysia	11.56	q
8	2	Trần Thị Nhi Yến	Vietnam	11.57	Q, PB
9	4	Loi Im Lan	Macau	11.69	Q
10	1	Aziza Sbaity	Lebanon	11.74	Q
11	2	Midori Mikase	Japan	11.78	Q
12	4	Elizabeth-Ann Tan	Singapore	11.81	q
13	3	Rima Kashafutdinova	Kazakhstan	11.82	q
14	3	Mazoon Al-Alawi	Oman	11.84	q
15	2	Leung Kwan Yi	Hong Kong	11.88	Q
16	3	Athicha Petchakul	Thailand	11.89	
17	1	Kim Da-eun	South Korea	11.94	Q
18	1	Kong Chun Ki	Hong Kong	12.01	
19	2	Valentina Meredova	Turkmenistan	12.05	
20	2	Arina Misheyeva	Kazakhstan	12.28	
21	4	Mariyam Alhaa	Maldives	12.30	
22	1	On-Uma Chattha	Thailand	12.38	
23	2	Aishath Shaba Saleem	Maldives	12.80	
24	4	Sharlot Emile George Abyad	Jordan	13.17	
25	1	Pom Lomany	Laos	13.25	
	2	Liang Xiaojing	China	DQ	FS
	4	Azreen Nabila Binti Alias	Malaysia	DNS	
	4	Supanich Poolkerd	Thailand	DNS	

=== Semifinals ===
Held on 14 July
Qualification rule: First 3 in each heat (Q) and the next 2 fastest (q) qualified for the final.

Wind:
Heat 1: +0.9 m/s, Heat 2: +0.1 m/

Rank	Heat	Name	Nationality	Time	Notes
1	2	Shanti Pereira	Singapore	11.30	Q
2	1	Hamideh Esmaeilnejad	Iran	11.35	Q
3	1	Ge Manqi	China	11.42	Q
4	2	Farzaneh Fasihi	Iran	11.45	Q
5	2	Arisa Kimishima	Japan	11.47	Q
6	1	Trần Thị Nhi Yến	Vietnam	11.55	Q, PB
7	1	Kristina Knott	Philippines	11.56	q
8	2	Aziza Sbaity	Lebanon	11.65	q
9	2	Zaidatul Husniah Zulkifli	Malaysia	11.67	
10	2	Loi Im Lan	Macau	11.85	
11	1	Elizabeth-Ann Tan	Singapore	11.86	
12	1	Kim Da-eun	South Korea	11.87	
13	2	Rima Kashafutdinova	Kazakhstan	11.89	
14	1	Mazoon Al-Alawi	Oman	11.95	
15	2	Leung Kwan Yi	Hong Kong	12.03	
	1	Midori Mikase	Japan	DNS	

=== Final ===
Held on 14 July
Wind: 0.0 m/s

Rank	Lane	Name	Nationality	Time	Notes
1st place, gold medalist(s)	6	Shanti Pereira	Singapore	11.20	NR
2nd place, silver medalist(s)	3	Farzaneh Fasihi	Iran	11.39	PB
3rd place, bronze medalist(s)	4	Ge Manqi	China	11.40	
4	5	Hamideh Esmaeilnejad	Iran	11.46	
5	7	Arisa Kimishima	Japan	11.56	
6	1	Kristina Knott	Philippines	11.61	
7	2	Aziza Sbaity	Lebanon	11.61	
8	8	Trần Thị Nhi Yến	Vietnam	11.64	
