= Athletics at the 2022 Asian Games – Women's 100 metres =

Women's 100 metres at the 2022 Asian Games
- Venue: Hangzhou Olympic Expo Main Stadium
- Date: 29–30 September 2023
- Competitors: 25 from 18 nations

Medalists
gold medal	Ge Manqi	China
silver medal	Shanti Pereira	Singapore
bronze medal	Hajar Al-Khaldi	Bahrain

The women's 100 metres competition at the 2022 Asian Games took place on 29 and 30 September 2023 at the HOC Stadium, Hangzhou.

== Schedule ==
All times are China Standard Time (UTC+08:00)

Date	Time	Event
Friday, 29 September 2023	21:00	Round 1
Saturday, 30 September 2023	21:40	Final

== Records ==
Prior to this competition, the existing world, Asian and Games records were as follows.

World Record	Florence Griffith Joyner (USA)	10.49	Indianapolis, United States	16 July 1988
Asian Record	Li Xuemei (CHN)	10.79	Shanghai, China	18 October 1997
Games Record	Susanthika Jayasinghe (SRI)	11.15	Busan, South Korea	8 October 2002

== Results ==
=== Round 1 ===
- Qualification: First 2 in each heat (Q) and the next 2 fastest (q) advance to the final.

==== Heat 1 ====
- Wind: +1.3 m/s

Rank	Athlete	Time	Notes
1	Ge Manqi (CHN)	11.17	Q
2	Edidiong Odiong (BRN)	11.34	Q
3	Trần Thị Nhi Yến (VIE)	11.59	q
4	Aziza Sbaity (LBN)	11.71	
5	Kim Da-eun (KOR)	11.72	
6	Kong Chun Ki (HKG)	11.87	
7	Arooj Kiran (PAK)	12.04	
8	Mariyam Alhaa Hussain (MDV)	12.52	

==== Heat 2 ====
- Wind: +0.3 m/s

Rank	Athlete	Time	Notes
1	Hajar Al-Khaldi (BRN)	11.34	Q
2	Supanich Poolkerd (THA)	11.36	Q
3	Shanti Pereira (SGP)	11.42	q
4	Farzaneh Fasihi (IRI)	11.70	
5	Loi Im Lan (MAC)	11.79	
6	Tameen Khan (PAK)	12.42	
7	Silina Pha Aphay (LAO)	12.58	
8	Enkhbaataryn Sarangua (MGL)	13.07	
9	Kamia Yousufi (AFG)	13.32	

==== Heat 3 ====
- Wind: 0.0 m/s

Rank	Athlete	Time	Notes
1	Wei Yongli (CHN)	11.35	Q
2	Hamideh Esmaeilnejad (IRI)	11.57	Q
3	Kristina Knott (PHI)	11.77	
4	Elizabeth-Ann Tan (SGP)	12.00	
5	Leung Kwan Yi (HKG)	12.01	
6	Zaidatul Husniah Zulkifli (MAS)	12.11	
7	Mariyam Ru'ya Ali (MDV)	12.43	
8	Sang Lida (CAM)	12.64	

=== Final ===
- Wind: +1.3 m/s

Rank	Athlete	Time	Notes
1st place, gold medalist(s)	Ge Manqi (CHN)	11.23	
2nd place, silver medalist(s)	Shanti Pereira (SGP)	11.27	
3rd place, bronze medalist(s)	Hajar Al-Khaldi (BRN)	11.35	
4	Supanich Poolkerd (THA)	11.35	
5	Wei Yongli (CHN)	11.40	
6	Edidiong Odiong (BRN)	11.54	
7	Hamideh Esmaeilnejad (IRI)	11.54	
8	Trần Thị Nhi Yến (VIE)	11.58	
