= Athletics at the 2022 Asian Games – Women's 4 × 100 metres relay =

Women's 4 × 100 metres relay at the 2022 Asian Games
- Venue: Hangzhou Olympic Expo Main Stadium
- Date: 3 October 2023
- Competitors: 28 from 7 nations

Medalists
gold medal	China; Liang Xiaojing, Wei Yongli, Yuan Qiqi, Ge Manqi
silver medal	Thailand; Supawan Thipat, Supanich Poolkerd, Onuma Chattha, Sukanda Petraksa
bronze medal	Malaysia; Azreen Nabila Alias, Zaidatul Husniah Zulkifli, Nur Afrina Batrisyia, Shereen Samson Vallabouy

The women's 4 × 100 metres relay competition at the 2022 Asian Games took place on 3 October 2023 at the HOC Stadium, Hangzhou.

The Bahraini team originally won bronze but was later disqualified after they have found to have performed an illegal changeover.

== Schedule ==
All times are China Standard Time (UTC+08:00)

Date	Time	Event
Tuesday, 3 October 2023	21:05	Final

== Records ==
Prior to this competition, the existing world, Asian and Games records were as follows.

World Record	United States	40.82	London, United Kingdom	10 August 2012
Asian Record	China	42.23	Shanghai, China	23 October 1997
Games Record	Bahrain	42.73	Jakarta, Indonesia	30 August 2018

== Results ==
Legend

- DSQ — Disqualified

Rank	Team	Time	Notes
1st place, gold medalist(s)	China (CHN); Liang Xiaojing; Wei Yongli; Yuan Qiqi; Ge Manqi	43.39	
2nd place, silver medalist(s)	Thailand (THA); Supawan Thipat; Supanich Poolkerd; Onuma Chattha; Sukanda Petraksa	44.32	
3rd place, bronze medalist(s)	Malaysia (MAS); Azreen Nabila Alias; Zaidatul Husniah Zulkifli; Nur Afrina Batrisyia; Shereen Samson Vallabouy	45.01	
4	Hong Kong (HKG); Chan Pui Kei; Leung Kwan Yi; Li Tsz To; Kong Chun Ki	45.24	
5	Singapore (SGP); Shanti Pereira; Elizabeth-Ann Tan; Roxanne Rose Zulueta Enriquez; Bernice Liew	45.34	
6	Maldives (MDV); Mariyam Alhaa Hussain; Mariyam Ru'ya Ali; Aishath Himna Hassan; Ahnaa Nizaar	47.54	
—	Bahrain (BRN); Fatima Mubarak; Edidiong Odiong; Zenab Moussa Mahamat; Hajar Al-Khaldi	DSQ	
