= List of Asian youth records in athletics =

Asian youth records in the sport of athletics are ratified by the Asian Athletics Association (AAA). They are the all-time best marks set in competition by athletes aged 17 or younger throughout the entire calendar year of the performance and competing for a member nation of the Asian Athletics Association. The AAA maintains a list of youth records only in a specific list of outdoor events. All other records, including all indoor records, shown on this list are tracked by independent statisticians and are not officially sanctioned by the governing body.

== Outdoor ==
Key: Awaiting ratification Not an AAA record event Not ratified or later rescinded by AAA

=== Boys ===
Event	Record	Athlete	Nationality	Date	Meet	Place	Age	Ref.
100 m	10.00 (+1.7 m/s)	Sorato Shimizu	Japan	26 July 2025	All Japan High School Championships	Hiroshima, Japan	16 years, 168 days	
200 m	20.19 (+1.7 m/s)	Puripol Boonson	Thailand	27 June 2022	Qosanov Memorial	Almaty, Kazakhstan	16 years, 165 days	
300 m	33.26	Yohei Ozawa	Japan	11 October 2024	National Sports Festival	Saga, Japan	17 years, 72 days	
400 m	45.33	Taiju Goto	Japan	3 November 2026	Ecopa Track Games	Fukuroi, Japan	17 years, 182 days	
600 m	1:18.28	Ko Ochiai	Japan	22 April 2023	Tokyo Spring Challenge	Tokyo, Japan	16 years, 248 days	
800 m	1:44.34	Belal Mansoor Ali	Bahrain	17 June 2005		Conegliano, Italy	16 years, 243 days	
1000 m	2:17.44	Hamza Driouch	Qatar	9 August 2011	Formtoppningen & Kastkvitter	Sollentuna, Sweden	16 years, 266 days	
1500 m	3:33.86	Belal Mansoor Ali	Bahrain	1 June 2005		Milan, Italy	16 years, 243 days	
Mile								
3000 m	7:47.65	Aadam Ismaeel Khamis	Bahrain	22 June 2006	CAA Grand Prix d'Alger	Algiers, Algeria	17 years, 130 days	
5000 m	13:31.19	Keita Satoh	Japan	3 October 2021	Nippon Sport Science University Long Distance Competition	Yokohama, Japan	17 years, 254 days	
10,000 m	28:02.08	Aadam Ismaeel Khamis	Bahrain	9 December 2006	Asian Games	Doha, Qatar	17 years, 300 days	
110 m hurdles (91.4 cm)	13.03 (+0.5 m/s)	Liu Mingxuan	China	15 August 2025	1st National Junior Games	Shenyang, China	16 years, 257 days	
110 m hurdles (99.0 cm)	13.29 (+0.5 m/s)	Yuanjiang Chen	China	25 August 2023	Japan-Korea-China Junior Exchange Competition	Wakayama, Japan	17 years, 210 days	
110 m hurdles (106.7 cm)	13.69 (+1.4 m/s)	Tetsuro Nishi	Japan	1 August 2021	Japan High School Championships	Fukui, Japan	17 years, 177 days	
400 m hurdles (91.0 cm)	47.93	Taiju Goto	Japan	28 September 2026	Asian Games	Nagoya, Japan	17 years, 146 days	
400 m hurdles (84.0 cm)	50.25	Amin Mohamed Al Ozon	Syria	14 July 2001	World Youth Championships	Debrecen, Hungary	17 years, 7 days	
2000 m steeplechase	5:37.80	Ali Ahmed Al Amri	Saudi Arabia	2 October 2004	Jeddah Pan Arab Schools Championships	Jeddah, Saudi Arabia	16 years, 279 days	
3000 m steeplechase	8:32.72	Chen Ming	China	27 October 2002	Chinese National GP Final	Tiantai, China	17 years, 285 days	
High jump	2.27 m	Haiqiang Huang	China	16 July 2005	World Youth Championships	Marrakesh, Morocco	17 years, 158 days	
Pole vault	5.46 m	Masaki Ejima	Japan	7 October 2016	National Sports Festival of Japan	Kitakami, Japan	17 years, 215 days	
Long jump	8.17 m (+0.5 m/s)	Zhang Xiaoyi	China	23 April 2006	Chinese National GP	Chongqing, China	16 years, 333 days	
Triple jump	16.89 m	Gu Junjie	China	25 August 2000		Guangzhou, China	15 years, 112 days	
Shot put (5 kg)	22.10 m	Wang Like	China	22 July 2006		Huizhou, China	17 years, 111 days	
Shot put (6 kg)	20.17 m	Wang Like	China	15 July 2006		Macao, Macao	17 years, 104 days	
Discus throw (1.75 kg)	63.63 m	Moaaz Mohamed Ibrahim	Qatar	24 July 2016	IAAF World U20 Championships	Bydgoszcz, Poland	17 years, 167 days	
Hammer throw (5 kg)	81.55 m	Wang Qi	China	16 April 2018	National Grand Prix	Zhuzhou, China	17 years, 65 days	
Hammer throw (6 kg)	85.57 m WJR	Ashraf Elseify	Qatar	14 July 2012	World Junior Championships	Barcelona, Spain	17 years, 145 days	
Hammer throw	67.62 m	Wang Qi	China	14 September 2018		Taiyuan, China	17 years, 216 days	
Javelin throw (700 g)	82.34 m	Qingbo Wang	China	17 May 2005		Ningbo, China	16 years, 358 days	
Javelin throw (800 g)	78.68 m	Chao-Tsun Cheng	Chinese Taipei	15 October 2010	Chinese Taipei Championships	Miaoli, Chinese Taipei	16 years, 363 days	
Decathlon	7203 pts	Xiaohong Chen	China	31 May–1 June 2013		Suzhou, China	16 years, 112 days	
Decathlon	100m (wind) / Long jump (wind) / Shot put / High jump / 400m / 110m H (wind) / Discus / Pole vault / Javelin / 1500m; 10.97 (+0.3 m/s) / 7.04 m (+0.3 m/s) / 11.30 m / 2.01 m / 50.97 / 15.41 (−0.1 m/s) / 37.85 m / 4.20 m / 60.32 m / 5:05.61							
5000 m walk (track)	19:30.15	Zhang Rui	China	11 October 2006	Shandong Games U18	Yantai, China	17 years, 272 days	
10,000 m walk (track)	39:47.20	Chen Ding	China	11 July 2008	World Junior Championships	Bydgoszcz, Poland	15 years, 341 days	
10 km walk (road)	38:57	Li Tianlei	China	18 September 2010	IAAF Race Walking Challenge Final	Beijing, China	15 years, 248 days	
20,000 m walk (track)	1:23:37.21	Li Tianlei	China	18 September 2012	Chinese University Games	Tianjin, China	17 years, 249 days	
20 km walk (road)	1:18:07	Li Gaobo	China	23 April 2005		Cixi, China	15 years, 274 days	
50 km walk (road)	3:45:46	Yu Guoping	China	23 November 2001		Guangzhou, China	15 years, 163 days	
4 × 100 m relay	39.92	Pruksorranan; Nuansi; Sukkasem; Daenkhanob	Thailand	28 November 2024		Kota Kinabalu, Malaysia		
4 × 400 m relay								

=== Girls ===
Event	Record	Athlete	Nationality	Date	Meet	Place	Age	Ref.
100 m	11.10 (+0.7 m/s)	Chen Yujie	China	17 November 2025	National Games of China	Guangzhou, China	16 years, 323 days	
200 m	22.97 (+0.3 m/s)	Chen Yujie	China	31 May 2025	Asian Championships	Gumi, South Korea	16 years, 153 days	
400 m	50.01	Li Jing	China	18 October 1997	Chinese National Games	Shanghai, China	17 years, 246 days	
600 m	1:30.99	Senri Mori	Japan	22 April 2023	Tokyo Spring Challenge	Tokyo, Japan	17 years, 25 days	
800 m	1:57.18	Wang Yuan	China	8 September 1993	Chinese National Games	Beijing, China	17 years, 153 days	
1000 m								
1500 m	3:54.52	Ling Zhang	China	18 October 1997	Chinese National Games	Shanghai, China	16 years, 188 days	
Mile								
3000 m	8:36.45	Ma Ningning	China	6 June 1993		Jinan, China	17 years, 5 days	
5000 m	14:45.71	Song Liqing	China	21 October 1997	Chinese National Games	Shanghai, China	17 years, 274 days	
10,000 m	31:11.26	Song Liqing	China	19 October 1997	Chinese National Games	Shanghai, China	17 years, 272 days	
Marathon	2:25:15	Sun Weiwei	China	20 October 2002	Beijing Marathon	Beijing, China	16 years, 279 days	
100 m hurdles (76.2 cm)	13.17 (+0.1 m/s)	Keyi Zhang	China	8 November 2026	Summer Youth Olympics	Dakar, Senegal	17 years, 91 days	
100 m hurdles (84 cm)	13.19 (−1.2 m/s)	Le Hsu	Chinese Taipei	4 December 2020	Chinese Taipei Championships	New Taipei City, Chinese Taipei	17 years, 201 days	
400 m hurdles	55.30 (Note: ratified by AAA but not recognized by World Athletics)	Rui Li	China	26 October 1995	China National Youth Games	Nanjing, China	15 years, 338 days	
400 m hurdles	55.43 (Note: recognized by World Athletics)	Shuju Li	China	21 October 1997	Shanghai Chinese National Games	Shanghai, China	16 years, 93 days	
2000 m steeplechase	6:33.06	Parami Wasanthi Maristela	Sri Lanka	12 October 2018	Youth Olympic Games	Buenos Aires, Argentina	17 years, 137 days	
2000 m steeplechase	6:17.33 (Note: Not ratified as Jebet was not yet eligible to compete for Bahrain internationally following her transfer from Kenya.)	Ruth Jebet	Bahrain	29 October 2013		Manama, Bahrain	16 years, 346 days	
3000 m steeplechase	9:57.34	Wang Huan	China	6 August 2006	Chinese Championships	Shijiazhuang, China	17 years, 206 days	
3000 m steeplechase	9:52.47 (Note: Not ratified as Jebet was not yet eligible to compete for Bahrain internationally following her transfer from Kenya.)	Ruth Jebet	Bahrain	23 May 2013	Arab Championships	Doha, Qatar	16 years, 187 days	
High jump	1.92 m	Xingjuan Zheng	China	24 April 2005		Zhongshan, China	16 years, 35 days	
High jump	1.93 m (Note: not ratified by AAA but recognized by World Athletics)	Xingjuan Zheng	China	29 October 2006	National Grand Prix Final	Changsha, China	17 years, 223 days	
Pole vault	4.45 m	Zhang Yingning	China	29 October 2006	National Grand Prix Final	Changsha, China	16 years, 296 days	
Long jump	6.74 m (+1.0 m/s)	Lu Minjia	China	23 October 2009	Chinese National Games	Jinan, China	16 years, 298 days	
Triple jump	14.57 m (+0.2 m/s)	Qiuyan Huang	China	19 October 1997	Chinese National Games	Shanghai, China	17 years, 287 days	
Shot put (3 kg)	19.31 m	Li Xinhui	China	16 April 2018	National Grand Prix	Zhuzhou, China	17 years, 65 days	
Discus throw	60.50 m	Yan Liang	China	25 September 2012	Chinese Championships	Kunshan, China	17 years, 267 days	
Hammer throw (3 kg)	68.84 m	Jie Zhao	China	24 May 2019	Chinese U18 Championships	Huludao, China	16 years, 223 days	
Hammer throw (4 kg)	70.60 m	Wenxiu Zhang	China	5 April 2003		Nanning, China	17 years, 14 days	
Javelin throw (500 g)	63.69 m (Note: ratified by AAA but not recognized by World Athletics)	Ying Wang	China	15 May 2018		Jinzhou, China	16 years, 344 days	
Javelin throw (600 g)	64.83 m	Ziyi Yan	China	28 March 2025	Throws Invitation Meeting	Chengdu, China	16 years, 307 days	
Heptathlon (youth)	5454 pts	Meg Hemphill	Japan	12–13 July 2013	World Youth Championships in Athletics	Donetsk, Ukraine	17 years, 51 days	
Heptathlon (youth)	100m H (wind) / High jump / Shot put / 200m (wind) / Long jump (wind) / Javelin / 800m; 13.91 (−1.2 m/s) / 1.54 m / 12.43 m / 25.71 (−0.5 m/s) / 5.17 m (−0.2 m/s) / 46.61 m / 2:15.70							
Heptathlon (senior)	6185 pts	Shen Shengfei	China	17–18 October 1997	Chinese National Games	Shanghai, China	16 years, 331 days	
Heptathlon (senior)	100m H (wind) / High jump / Shot put / 200m (wind) / Long jump (wind) / Javelin / 800m; 14.23 (+1.6 m/s) / 1.83 m / 14.37 m / 24.13 (±0.0 m/s) / 5.93 m (−1.1 m/s) / 44.50 m / 2:17.81							
3000 m walk (track)	12:22.2 h	Qin Aihua	China	4 September 2004		Yenking, China	16 years, 306 days	
3000 m walk (track)	12:11.70	Yu Miao	China	27 August 2005	Chinese High School Championships	Zhengzhou, China	16 years, 147 days	
5000 m walk (track)	21:13.16	Cui Yingzi	China	30 October 1988		Jinan, China	17 years, 278 days	
5 km walk (road)	21:05	Yang Xizhen	China	8 April 2023	Chinese Race Walking Grand Prix 2	Taicang, China	17 years, 28 days	
10,000 m walk (track)	42:56.09	Gao Hongmiao	China	27 September 1991		Tangshan, China	17 years, 194 days	
10 km walk (road)	43:15	Li Hong	China	10 March 1996		Zhuhai, China	16 years, 283 days	
20,000 m walk (track)	1:34:21.56	Wang Xue	China	1 November 2007		Wuhan, China	17 years, 260 days	
20 km walk (road)	1:30:35	Zhou Tongmei	China	23 April 2005		Cixi City, China	17 years, 19 days	
4 × 100 m relay								
4 × 400 m relay	3:44.27	Sunshine Youth Sports Club; Leyi Chen; Xueying He; Peijing Li; Hailing Yan	China	18 August 2019	Chinese Youth Games	Taiyuan, China	16 years, 97 days 16 years, 352 days 15 years, 269 days 16 years, 283 days	

== Indoor ==
The AAA does not keep official youth bests in indoor events.

=== Boys ===
Event	Record	Athlete	Nationality	Date	Meet	Place	Age	Ref.
60 m	6.68	Zhao Haohuan	China	22 February 2004	Chinese National Grand Prix	Beijing, China	16 years, 2 days	
200 m	21.25	Lu Shangbin	China	11 March 2010	Chinese Indoor Grand Prix	Nanjing, China	16 years, 350 days	
400 m								
800 m	1:49.63	Li Huiquan	China	18 February 2003	China-Japan International Match	Tianjin, China	15 years, 99 days	
1000 m								
1500 m	3:48.84	Lin Xiangqian	China	14 February 2004		Shanghai, China	17 years, 18 days	
3000 m	7:50.10	Aadam Ismaeel Khamis	Bahrain	11 February 2006	Asian Championships	Pattaya, Thailand	16 years, 364 days	
5000 m								
60 m hurdles (99.0 cm)	7.75	Syouma Iwamoto	Japan	3 February 2024	Japan Indoor Meet - U20 & U18	Osaka, Japan	16 years, 212 days	
60 m hurdles (91.4 cm)	7.86	Syouma Iwamoto	Japan	12 March 2022	Japan Indoor Meet U16	Osaka, Japan	14 years, 249 days	
High jump	2.18 m	Hu Tong	China	17 February 2003		Tianjin, China	17 years, 20 days	
Pole vault	5.30 m	Yang Yansheng	China	20 February 2005	Chinese National Grand Prix	Shanghai, China	17 years, 46 days	
Long jump	7.93 m	Wang Jianan	China	23 March 2013		Fuzhou, China	16 years, 208 days	
Triple jump	16.29 m	Fang Yaoqing	China	23 March 2013		Fuzhou, China	16 years, 337 days	
Shot put								
Heptathlon								
Heptathlon	60m / Long jump / Shot put / High jump / 60m H / Pole vault / 1000m							
5000 m walk								
4 × 400 m relay								

=== Girls ===
Event	Record	Athlete	Nationality	Date	Meet	Place	Age	Ref.
60 m	7.36	Li Yuting	China	23 February 2019	China Indoor Grand Prix	Nanjing, China	16 years, 296 days	
200 m	23.99	Liang Xiaojing	China	22 March 2014	National Indoor Grand Prix	Beijing, China	16 years, 349 days	
400 m	54.69	Jingwen Chen	China	21 March 2007	Beijing National Indoor GP	Beijing, China	17 years, 41 days	
800 m	2:05.66	Wang Chunyu	China	23 February 2011	Chinese Indoor Grand Prix	Nanjing, China	16 years, 37 days	
1500 m	4:17.17	Xue Fei	China	24 February 2006	Chinese National Indoor Grand Prix	Beijing, China	16 years, 200 days	
3000 m	9:08.24	Wang Xiaoming	China	22 February 2000		Beijing, China	15 years, 19 days	
5000 m								
60 m hurdles (76.2 cm)	8.27	Miki Hayashi	Japan	12 March 2022	Japan Indoor Meet U18	Osaka, Japan	16 years, 300 days	
High jump	1.90 m	Zheng Xingjuan	China	19 February 2006	National Indoor Grand Prix	Shanghai, China	16 years, 336 days	
Pole vault	4.46 m	Zhang Yingning	China	15 March 2007	Chinese Indoor Grand Prix	Shanghai, China	17 years, 68 days	
Long jump	6.43 m	Wang Rong	China	6 March 2013	Chinese Indoor Grand Prix	Nanjing, China	16 years, 248 days	
Long jump	6.43 m	Wang Rong	China	29 March 2013	Chinese Indoor Grand Prix	Beijing, China	16 years, 271 days	
Triple jump	14.09 m	Wang Rong	China	7 March 2013	Chinese Indoor Grand Prix	Nanjing, China	16 years, 249 days	
Shot put								
Pentathlon								
Pentathlon	60m H / High jump / Shot put / Long jump / 800m							
Pentathlon (youth)	3824 pts	Adina Mahsutova	Kazakhstan	9 February 2019	Kazakh U18 Championships	Oskemen, Kazakhstan	16 years, 334 days	
Pentathlon (youth)	60m H / High jump / Shot put / Long jump / 800m; 8.67 / 1.72 m / 11.75 m / 5.36 m / 2:32.65							
3000 m walk								
4 × 400 m relay								
