= Athletics at the 2022 Asian Games – Women's 200 metres =

Athletics competition

Women's 200 metres at the 2022 Asian Games
- Venue: Hangzhou Olympic Expo Main Stadium
- Date: 1–2 October 2023
- Competitors: 24 from 19 nations

Medalists
| gold medal | Shanti Pereira | Singapore |
| silver medal | Li Yuting | China |
| bronze medal | Edidiong Odiong | Bahrain |

The women's 200 metres competition at the 2022 Asian Games took place on 1 and 2 October 2023 at the HOC Stadium, Hangzhou.

== Schedule ==
All times are China Standard Time (UTC+08:00)

| Date | Time | Event |
|---|---|---|
| Sunday, 1 October 2023 | 09:40 | Round 1 |
| Monday, 2 October 2023 | 19:45 | Final |

== Records ==
Prior to this competition, the existing world, Asian and Games records were as follows.

| World Record | Florence Griffith Joyner (USA) | 21.34 | Seoul, South Korea | 29 September 1988 |
| Asian Record | Li Xuemei (CHN) | 22.01 | Shanghai, China | 22 October 1997 |
| Games Record | Damayanthi Dharsha (SRI) | 22.48 | Bangkok, Thailand | 18 December 1998 |

== Results ==
Legend

- DNS — Did not start
- DSQ — Disqualified

=== Round 1 ===
- Qualification: First 2 in each heat (Q) and the next 2 fastest (q) advance to the final.

==== Heat 1 ====
- Wind: −1.0 m/s

| Rank | Athlete | Time | Notes |
|---|---|---|---|
| 1 | Li Yuting (CHN) | 23.67 | Q |
| 2 | Olga Safronova (KAZ) | 23.71 | Q |
| 3 | Jyothi Yarraji (IND) | 23.78 | |
| 4 | Aziza Sbaity (LBN) | 24.57 | |
| 5 | Li Tsz To (HKG) | 24.89 | |
| 6 | Batboldyn Solongo (MGL) | 26.01 | |
| 7 | Kamia Yousufi (AFG) | 27.53 | |
| — | Hamideh Esmaeilnejad (IRI) | DNS | |

==== Heat 2 ====
- Wind: 0.0 m/s

| Rank | Athlete | Time | Notes |
|---|---|---|---|
| 1 | Salwa Eid Naser (BRN) | 23.74 | Q |
| 2 | Kristina Knott (PHI) | 24.02 | Q |
| 3 | Rumeshika Rathnayake (SRI) | 24.51 | |
| 4 | Elizabeth-Ann Tan (SGP) | 24.84 | |
| 5 | Zaidatul Husniah Zulkifli (MAS) | 24.86 | |
| 6 | Loi Im Lan (MAC) | 25.03 | |
| 7 | Aishath Himna Hassan (MDV) | 25.59 | |
| 8 | Otgonpüreviin Mönkhtümen (MGL) | 26.41 | |

==== Heat 3 ====
- Wind: +2.0 m/s

| Rank | Athlete | Time | Notes |
|---|---|---|---|
| 1 | Shanti Pereira (SGP) | 23.14 | Q |
| 2 | Edidiong Odiong (BRN) | 23.35 | Q |
| 3 | Huang Guifen (CHN) | 23.54 | q |
| 4 | Trần Thị Nhi Yến (VIE) | 23.74 | q |
| 5 | Mudhawi Al-Shammari (KUW) | 23.83 | |
| 6 | Ahnaa Nizaar (MDV) | 25.66 | |
| 7 | Levanita da Costa (TLS) | 28.95 | |
| — | Tameen Khan (PAK) | DSQ | |

=== Final ===
- Wind: −0.2 m/s

| Rank | Athlete | Time | Notes |
|---|---|---|---|
| 1st place, gold medalist(s) | Shanti Pereira (SGP) | 23.03 | |
| 2nd place, silver medalist(s) | Li Yuting (CHN) | 23.28 | |
| 3rd place, bronze medalist(s) | Edidiong Odiong (BRN) | 23.48 | |
| 4 | Olga Safronova (KAZ) | 23.67 | |
| 5 | Huang Guifen (CHN) | 23.70 | |
| 6 | Kristina Knott (PHI) | 23.79 | |
| 7 | Trần Thị Nhi Yến (VIE) | 23.85 | |
| — | Salwa Eid Naser (BRN) | DSQ | |
