= Athletics at the 2026 Asian Games – Mixed 4 × 100 metres relay =

Mixed 4 × 100 metres relay at the 2026 Asian Games
- Venue: Nagoya City Mizuho Park Athletics Stadium
- Date: 28–29 September 2026
- Competitors: 60 from 13 nations

Medalists
gold medal	Chen Jinfeng; Liu Guoyi; Shi Junhao; Chen Yujie	China
silver medal	Natawat Iamudom; Supanich Poolkerd; Puripol Boonson; Jirapat Khanonta	Thailand
bronze medal	Gurindervir Singh; Sneha Sathyanarayana; Animesh Kujur; Harita Bhadra	India

The mixed 4 × 100 metres relay competition at the 2026 Asian Games took place on 28 and 29 September 2026 at the Nagoya City Mizuho Park Athletics Stadium in Nagoya, Japan.

It was the first time the mixed 4 × 100 metres relay was contested at the Asian Games. China's Chen Jinfeng, Liu Guoyi, Shi Junhao and Chen Yujie won the gold medal in 40.78 seconds, a new Games record. Thailand took silver in 40.87 seconds and India claimed the bronze in 41.06 seconds.

== Schedule ==
All times are Japan Standard Time (UTC+09:00)

Schedule
Date	Time	Event
Monday, 28 September 2026	18:30	Round 1 (Heat 1)
Monday, 28 September 2026	18:39	Round 1 (Heat 2)
Tuesday, 29 September 2026	20:48	Final

== Records ==
Prior to this competition, the existing world, Asian and Games records were as follows.

World Record	Jamaica	39.62	Gaborone, Botswana	3 May 2026
Asian Record	—	—	—	—
Games Record	—	—	—	—

== Results ==
Legend

- Q — Qualified by place
- q — Qualified by time
- L — Lane infringement
- SB — Season best
- GR — Games record
- DQ — Disqualified
- DNF — Did not finish

=== Qualification ===
First three in each heat (Q) and next two fastest (q) advanced to the final.

==== Heat 1 ====
Rank	Team	Time	Notes
1	Thailand (THA); Chutithat Pruksorranan; Supanich Poolkerd; Chayut Khongprasit; Jirapat Khanonta	41.48	Q
2	Singapore (SGP); Tan Tate Fung; Elizabeth Tan; Marc Brian Louis; Shanti Pereira	41.66	Q
3	Japan (JPN); Fukuto Komuro; Midori Mikase; Yoshihide Kiryu; Abigeirufuka Ido	41.70	Q
4	Philippines (PHI); Anfernee Lopena; Kristina Knott; Neil Catral; Jessica Rose Laurance	41.92	q SB
5	Bahrain (BRN); Ali Haji; Raihanah Garoubah; Abdulraof Rashid; Salwa Naser	42.18	q L TR17.3.3
6	Malaysia (MAS); Muhammad Mohd; Izzatul Musfirah; Pengiran Hajam; Nur Aling	42.64	
—	Hong Kong (HKG); Cheung Ho-hin; Leung Kwan-yi; Lee Hong-kit; Wong Wan-chi	DQ	TR24.7

==== Heat 2 ====
Rank	Team	Time	Notes
1	China (CHN); Wu Haolin; Liu Guoyi; Shi Junhao; Zhu Junying	41.52	Q
2	India (IND); Gurindervir Singh; Abinaya Rajarajan; Animesh Kujur; Harita Bhadra	41.54	Q
3	Oman (OMA); Rashid Al-Aasmi; Mazoon Al-Alawi; Mohamed Al-Sadi; Azza Al-Yaarubi	43.76	Q
4	Uzbekistan (UZB); Sulton Gafurjonov; Laylo Allaberganova; Abbosbek Toshtemirov; Sabokhat Samijonova	44.25	
—	Iran (IRI); Hassan Taftian; Reihaneh Mobini; Benyamin Yousefi; Zahra Zarei Manoujan	DNF	
—	South Korea (KOR); Seo Min-jun; Seo Ji-hyun; Kim Si-on; Kim Ju-ha	DNF	

=== Final ===
Rank	Team	Time	Notes
1st place, gold medalist(s)	China (CHN); Chen Jinfeng; Liu Guoyi; Shi Junhao; Chen Yujie	40.78	SB GR
2nd place, silver medalist(s)	Thailand (THA); Natawat Iamudom; Supanich Poolkerd; Puripol Boonson; Jirapat Khanonta	40.87	SB
3rd place, bronze medalist(s)	India (IND); Gurindervir Singh; Sneha Sathyanarayana; Animesh Kujur; Harita Bhadra	41.06	PB
4	Singapore (SGP); Tan Tate Fung; Elizabeth Tan; Marc Brian Louis; Shanti Pereira	41.19	SB
5	Japan (JPN); Fukuto Komuro; Midori Mikase; Yoshihide Kiryu; Abigeirufuka Ido	41.24	SB
6	Philippines (PHI); Anfernee Lopena; Kristina Knott; Neil Catral; Jessica Rose Laurance	42.20	
7	Oman (OMA); Rashid Al-Aasmi; Mazoon Al-Alawi; Mohamed Al-Sadi; Azza Al-Yaarubi	43.75	SB
—	Bahrain (BRN); Ali Haji; Edidiong Odiong; Abdulraof Rashid; Hajar Alkhaldi	DNF	L
