= 2025 Asian Athletics Championships – Women's 100 metres =

Women's 100 metres at the 2025 Asian Athletics Championships
- Venue: Gumi Civic Stadium
- Location: Gumi, South Korea
- Dates: 27 May (heats); 28 May (final)
- Competitors: 22 from 17 nations
- Winning time: 11.37

Medalists
| gold medal | Liang Xiaojing | China |
| silver medal | Shanti Pereira | Singapore |
| bronze medal | Trần Thị Nhi Yến | Vietnam |

The women's 100 metres event at the 2025 Asian Athletics Championships was held on 27 and 28 May.

== Records ==
Records before the 2025 Asian Athletics Championships
| Record | Athlete (nation) | Time (s) | Location | Date |
|---|---|---|---|---|
| World record | Florence Griffith Joyner (USA) | 10.49 | Indianapolis, United States | 16 July 1988 |
| Asian record | Li Xuemei (CHN) | 10.79 | Shanghai, China | 18 August 1997 |
| Championship record | Olga Safronova (KAZ) | 11.17 | Doha, Qatar | 22 April 2019 |
| World leading | Tia Clayton (JAM) | 10.92 | Doha, Qatar | 16 May 2025 |
| Asian leading | Liang Xiaojing (CHN) | 11.31 | Zhaoqing, China | 12 April 2025 |

== Schedule ==
The event schedule, in local time (UTC+9), was as follows:

| Date | Time | Round |
|---|---|---|
| 27 May | 14:30 | Heats |
| 28 May | 19:50 | Final |

== Results ==
=== Heats ===
Held on 27 May. First 2 in each heat (Q) and the next 2 fastest (q) qualified for the final.

==== Heat 1 ====
| Place | Lane | Athlete | Nation | Time | Notes |
|---|---|---|---|---|---|
| 1 | 3 | Liang Xiaojing | China | 11.22 | Q |
| 2 | 4 | Shanti Pereira | Singapore | 11.40 | Q, SB |
| 3 | 6 | Aiha Yamagata | Japan | 11.53 | q, SB |
| 4 | 2 | Zaidatul Husniah Zulkifli | Malaysia | 11.65 | q |
| 5 | 7 | Kim Ae-young | South Korea | 11.95 | |
| 6 | 5 | Valentina Meredova | Turkmenistan | 12.12 | |
| 7 | 8 | Shirin Akter | Bangladesh | 12.31 | |
| | | | | Wind: (+0.9 m/s) | |

==== Heat 2 ====
| Place | Lane | Athlete | Nation | Time | Notes |
|---|---|---|---|---|---|
| 1 | 3 | Midori Mikase | Japan | 11.57 | Q |
| 2 | 5 | Zhu Junying | China | 11.74 | Q |
| 3 | 7 | Chan Pui Kei | Hong Kong | 11.82 | SB |
| 4 | 2 | Jirapat Khanonta | Thailand | 11.93 | |
| 5 | 6 | Tameen Khan | Pakistan | 12.14 | |
| 6 | 8 | Hibah Mohammed | Saudi Arabia | 12.40 | |
| — | 4 | Kristina Knott | Philippines | DQ | TR 16.8 |
| | | | | Wind: (−0.4 m/s) | |

==== Heat 3 ====
| Place | Lane | Athlete | Nation | Time | Notes |
|---|---|---|---|---|---|
| 1 | 4 | Trần Thị Nhi Yến | Vietnam | 11.59 | Q |
| 2 | 5 | Hu Chia-chen | Chinese Taipei | 11.64 | Q |
| 3 | 3 | Olga Safronova | Kazakhstan | 11.73 | SB |
| 4 | 6 | Supanich Poolkerd | Thailand | 11.75 | |
| 5 | 7 | Kim Dae-un | South Korea | 11.77 | |
| 6 | 2 | Kong Chun Ki | Hong Kong | 11.99 | |
| 7 | 8 | Ziva Moosa | Maldives | 12.40 | |
| 8 | 1 | Silina Pha Aphay | Laos | 12.74 | |
| | | | | Wind: (+1.3 m/s) | |

=== Final ===
| Place | Lane | Athlete | Nation | Time | Notes |
|---|---|---|---|---|---|
| 1st place, gold medalist(s) | 3 | Liang Xiaojing | China | 11.37 | |
| 2nd place, silver medalist(s) | 6 | Shanti Pereira | Singapore | 11.41 | |
| 3rd place, bronze medalist(s) | 4 | Trần Thị Nhi Yến | Vietnam | 11.54 | |
| 4 | 1 | Aiha Yamagata | Japan | 11.66 | |
| 5 | 5 | Midori Mikase | Japan | 11.74 | |
| 6 | 2 | Hu Chia-chen | Chinese Taipei | 11.85 | |
| 7 | 7 | Zhu Junying | China | 11.89 | |
| 8 | 8 | Zaidatul Husniah Zulkifli | Malaysia | 12.01 | |
| | | | | Wind: (−0.1 m/s) | |
