= 2025 Asian Athletics Championships – Women's 200 metres =

Women's 200 metres at the 2025 Asian Athletics Championships
- Venue: Gumi Civic Stadium
- Location: Gumi, South Korea
- Dates: 30 May (heats); 31 May (final)
- Competitors: 20 from 15 nations
- Winning time: 22.97

Medalists
gold medal	Chen Yujie	China
silver medal	Shanti Pereira	Singapore
bronze medal	Li Yuting	China

The women's 200 metres event at the 2025 Asian Athletics Championships was held on 30 and 31 May.

== Records ==
Records before the 2025 Asian Athletics Championships
Record	Athlete (nation)	Time (s)	Location	Date
World record	Florence Griffith Joyner (USA)	21.34	Seoul, South Korea	28 September 1988
Asian record	Li Xuemei (CHN)	22.01	Shanghai, China	22 October 1997
Championship record	Shanti Pereira (SGP)	22.70	Bangkok, Thailand	16 July 2023
World leading	Gabrielle Thomas (USA)	21.60	Eugene, United States	9 July 2023
Asian leading	Salwa Eid Naser (BHR)	22.45	Bayaguana, Dominican Republic	29 March 2025

== Schedule ==
The event schedule, in local time (UTC+9), was as follows:

Date	Time	Round
30 May	11:50	Heats
31 May	17:40	Final

== Results ==
=== Heats ===
Held on 30 May. First 2 in each heat (Q) and the next 2 fastest (q) qualified for the semi-finals.

==== Heat 1 ====
Place	Lane	Athlete	Nation	Time	Notes
1	5	Chen Yujie	China	23.60	Q
2	7	Kristina Knott	Philippines	23.70	Q
3	6	Nithya Gandhe	India	23.77	q
4	3	Aminat Kamarudeen	United Arab Emirates	23.89	q, PB
5	4	Laylo Allaberganova	Uzbekistan	24.67	
6	8	Ziva Moosa	Maldives	25.37	
7	2	Hibah Mohammed Mohammed	Saudi Arabia	25.60	PB
				Wind: (+0.4 m/s)	

==== Heat 2 ====
Place	Lane	Athlete	Nation	Time	Notes
1	7	Remi Tsuruta	Japan	23.37	Q, SB
2	6	Jyothi Yarraji	India	23.74	Q
3	3	Trần Thị Nhi Yến	Vietnam	24.02	
4	4	Jonbibi Hukmova	Uzbekistan	24.14	
5	5	Olga Safronova	Kazakhstan	24.37	
6	8	So-eun Kim	South Korea	24.48	SB
7	2	Mudhawi Al-Shammari	Kuwait	25.90	
				Wind: (−0.2 m/s)	

=== Final ===
Place	Lane	Athlete	Nation	Time	Notes
1st place, gold medalist(s)	5	Chen Yujie	China	22.97	PB
2nd place, silver medalist(s)	7	Shanti Pereira	Singapore	22.98	SB
3rd place, bronze medalist(s)	8	Li Yuting	China	23.23	SB
4	6	Remi Tsuruta	Japan	23.29	SB
5	4	Jyothi Yarraji	India	23.47	
6	3	Kristina Knott	Philippines	23.82	
7	1	Nithya Gandhe	India	23.90	
7	2	Aminat Kamarudeen	United Arab Emirates	23.92	
				Wind: (+0.3 m/s)	
