= Shereen Samson Vallabouy =

Malaysian sprinter (born 1998)

Personal information
- Full name: Shereen Samson Vallabouy
- Born: July 10, 1998 (age 28) Ipoh, Perak, Malaysia

Sport
- Country: Malaysia
- Sport: Track and field
- Event: 400 m
- Coached by: Derrick White

Achievements and titles
- Personal bests: 51.79s Nashville, 2024 NR
Medal record
Representing Malaysia
Event	1st	2nd	3rd
Asian Games	0	0	2
SEA Games	1	0	3
ASEAN School Games	0	1	0
Total	1	1	5
Women's athletics
Representing Malaysia
Asian Games
Bronze medal – third place	2022 Hangzhou	400 m
Bronze medal – third place	2022 Hangzhou	4×100 m relay
SEA Games
Gold medal – first place	2023 Phnom Penh	400 m
Bronze medal – third place	2015 Singapore	400 m
Bronze medal – third place	2015 Singapore	4x400 m relay
Bronze medal – third place	2017 Kuala Lumpur	4x400 m relay
ASEAN School Games
Silver medal – second place	2014 Marikina	4×100 m relay

Shereen Samson Vallabouy (born 10 July 1998) is a Malaysian athlete who specializes in 400m event. She is the current Malaysian 400 metres outdoor record holder with a time 51.79s. Shereen currently holds the Malaysian national record indoor in the 400 metres with a time of 53.79 seconds.

== Personal life ==
Shereen was born on 10 July 1998 in Ipoh, Perak. Shereen is the daughter of former national athlete Samson Vallabouy and former Olympian Josephine Mary Singarayar. She attended the Bukit Jalil Sports School in Kuala Lumpur. Shereen is currently pursuing a degree in recreation and tourism at Winona State University in Minnesota, United States, on an athletics scholarship.

== Career ==
2014

Vallabouy and her national teammates won silver medals at the 2014 ASEAN School Games in the 4x100 final with a time of 47.35 seconds. Vallabouy gained her first international experience when she took fourth place with the Malaysian 4x400 meter relay team at the 2014 Asian Junior Championships in Taipei in 3:45.24 minutes.

2015

Vallabouy surprised the nation by winning a bronze medal in the 400m event at the 2015 SEA Games. In the same competition, She teamed up with Zaimah Atifah Zainuddin, Nurul Faizah Asma Mazlan and Fathin Faqihah Mohd Yusuf to win a bronze in the 4x400 relay. Vallabouy also won the bronze medal in the 400m at the 2015 Asian Youth Championships in Doha in 55.14s.

2016

Vallabouy again took part in the Asian Junior Championships in Ho Chi Minh, when she managed to reach the final of the 200 meters but finished eighth in the 400 meters with a time 59,31s.

2017

At the 2017 SEA Games in Kuala Lumpur, Malaysia. Vallabouy won a bronze medal in the 4x400 relay with her national teammates with a time 3:43.31 minutes.

2018

In September 2018, Shereen representing Perak to win a gold medal in the 400m event at the 2018 Sukma Games with a time 55.69s. She also bagged a silver medal for Perak in 200m with a time 24.92s.

2022

She started her World Championships debut at the 2022 World Athletics Championships in Oregon in the 400m and was eliminated in the first round with 53.56s.

In August 2022, she took part in the 2022 Commonwealth Games in Birmingham, England. This time being eliminated in the first round of the 400 meters.

2023

On 17 April, Shereen broke the national 400m record held by Rabia Abdul Salam at the 63rd Annual Mt SAC Relays Athletics Championship in California with a time of 51.80s seconds during the heats. Shereen also broke the national 400m record indoor at the NCAA Division II Championships in Pittsburg, United States with a time of 53.79 seconds.

In May 2023, Shereen have surprised the nation after winning gold in 400m event at the 2023 SEA Games in Phnom Penh, Cambodia in 52.53 and took fourth place in the 4x400 meter relay with 3:39.89 minutes.

On 30 September, Shereen clinched the bronze medal for Malaysia in the 400m final with a time of 52.58 seconds at the 2022 Asian Games in Hangzhou, China.

== Personal bests ==
- 200 meters: 23.52 s (+1.8 m/s), May 6, 2022, in Mankato
- 200 meters (indoor): 25.02 s, January 14, 2022, in Mankato
- 400 meters: 51.79 s, June 2, 2024, in Nashville
  - 400 meters (indoor): 53.79 s, March 12, 2023, in Pittsburg (Malaysian record)
