= Abinaya Rajarajan =

Indian sprinter

Personal information
- Born: 21 November 2006 (age 19) Tenkasi, Tamil Nadu, India

Sport
- Sport: Athletics
- Events: 100 m, 200 m
Medal record
Women's athletics
Representing India
Asian Games
Bronze medal – third place	2026 Aichi–Nagoya	4x100m mixed
Asian Championships
Silver medal – second place	2025 Gumi	4×100m
Asian U20 Championships
Bronze medal – third place	2023 Yecheon	4×100m

Abinaya Rajarajan (born 21 November 2006) is an Indian sprinter who specialises 100 m events and the 200 m. She is an Asian Championships silver medallist, Asian Games and Asian U20 Championships bronze medallist.

== Early life ==
Rajarajan was born on 21 November 2006 and is from Tenkasi, Tamil Nadu.

== Career ==
Rajarajan made her international junior breakthrough at the 2023 Asian U20 Athletics Championships in Yecheon, South Korea. She finished fourth in the women's 100 metres final with a time of 11.90 seconds. She also won a bronze medal in the women's 4 × 100 metres relay as part of the Indian team.

At the 2025 Asian Athletics Championships in Gumi, South Korea, Rajarajan won a silver medal in the women's 4 × 100 metres relay. She ran alongside Srabani Nanda, Sneha Sathyanarayana Shanuvalli and Nithya Gandhe. The Indian team recorded 43.86 seconds and finished second behind China.

In September 2026, the Athletics Federation of India named Rajarajan in India's athletics squad for the 2026 Asian Games in Aichi-Nagoya, Japan, as a member of the women's 4 × 100 metres relay squad.
