= Kerstin Ong =

Singaporean sprinter

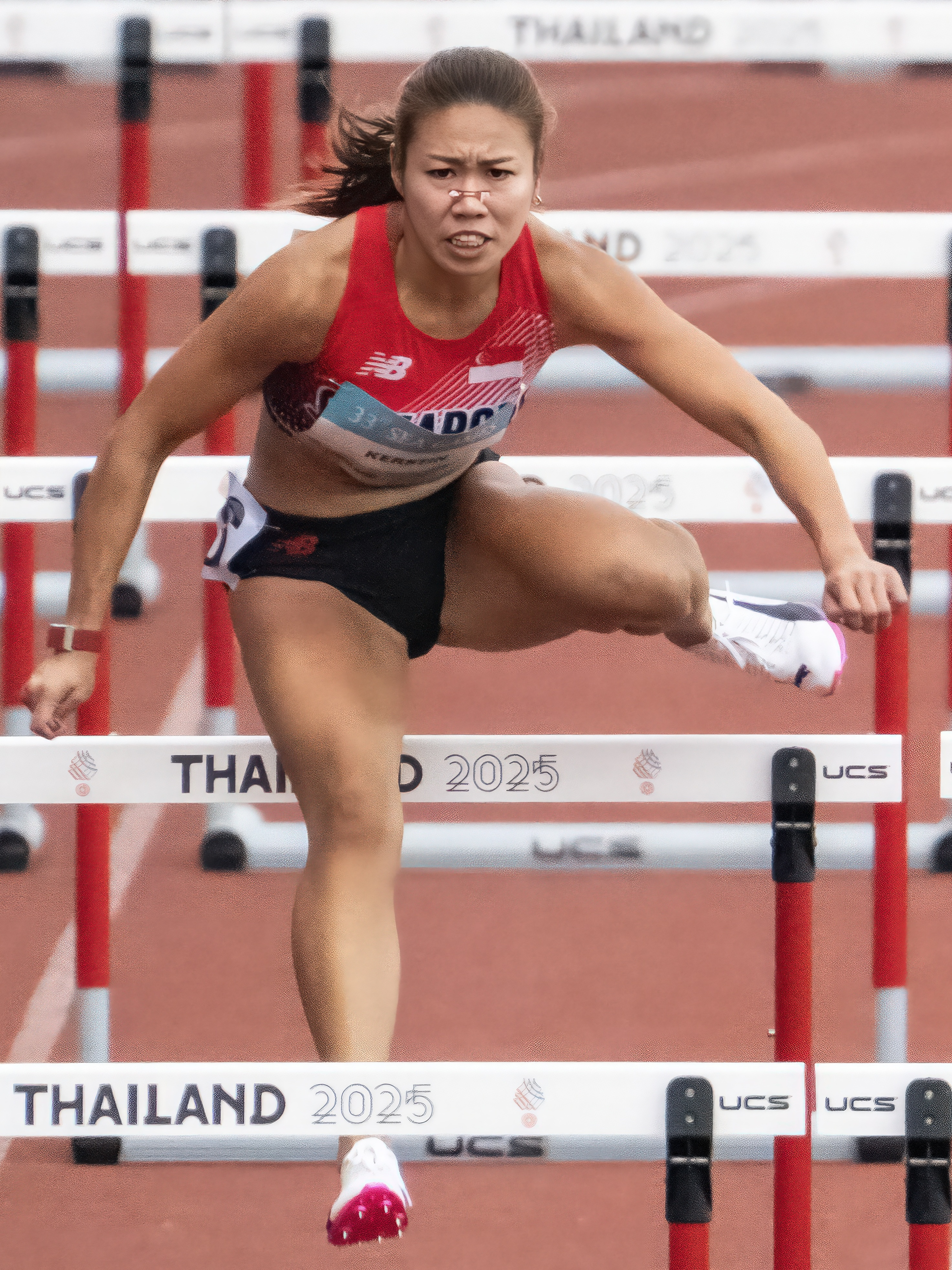
- Ong at the 2025 Southeast Asian Games

Personal information
- Born: 8 June 1997 (age 29) Singapore

Sport
- Country: Singapore
- Sport: Athletics
- Events: 100 metres hurdles, 4 x 100 metres relay

Kerstin Ong Jing Rong (Chinese: 王浄蓉; born 8 June 1997) is a Singaporean athlete who specialises in the 100 metres hurdles. She holds the national record for the 100 metres hurdles, breaking it first at the 2025 Malaysian Open with a time of 13.86s. She made her Southeast Asian Games debut in 2025, clocking 13.47s in the heats of the 100 metres hurdles, and 13.85s in the final. However, both times were not recognised by the Singapore National Olympic Council as technical issues were reported with the timing system.

She subsequently lowered her own national record twice in 2026, first clocking 13.81s at the Singapore Open in April, before improving it further to 13.80s at the Hong Kong Athletics Championships in May.

== Early life and education ==
Ong joined the Singapore Sports School through "a lucky stumble" – she wanted to skip her Chinese tuition class, and it just so happened that the Singapore Sports School direct school admission trials were happening on that day. "I went competitively into this sport because I joined the Singapore Sports School, and my passion and discipline grew there," she recalled.

She later pursued a Bachelor of Business Management degree at Singapore Management University (SMU), with a double major in Marketing and Corporate Communications.

== Athletic career ==
=== International competitions ===
2026 Asian Games (Aichi-Nagoya, Japan)

- Part of the 4x100m relay team alongside Shanti Pereira, Amanda Loo, and Elizabeth-Ann Tan that got 9th place

2026 Commonwealth Games (Glasgow)

- Part of the 4x100m relay team alongside Shanti Pereira, Amanda Loo, and Elizabeth-Ann Tan that got 9th place

2025 SEA Games (Thailand)

- Made her SEA Games debut, initially clocking 13.47s in the heats and 13.85s in the final.
- Part of the 4x100m relay team alongside Shanti Pereira, Laavinia Jaiganth, and Elizabeth-Ann Tan that got 4th place and broke the Singapore women's 4x100m relay national record.

2025 Singapore Open

- Part of the 4x100m relay team alongside Shanti Pereira, Laavinia Jaiganth, and Elizabeth-Ann Tan that got 2nd place and equalled the Singapore women's 4x100m relay national record.

2025 Malaysian Open

- Set a national record of 13.86s in the 100m hurdles, breaking the previous record of 13.87s held by Nur Izlyn Zaini by 0.01s.

2023 Johor Athletics Open

- Won gold in the 100m hurdles and bronze in the 100m sprint

2019 Singapore Open

- Won bronze medal in the 100m hurdles with a time of 14.94s, her first medal in her pet event.

2018 Singapore Open

- Won bronze medal in the 4x100m relay

2015

- Represented Singapore at the Asian Athletics Championships
