= Zaidatul Husniah Zulkifli =

Malaysian sprinter

Personal information
- Full name: Zaidatul Husniah Binti Zulkifli
- Nationality: Malaysian
- Born: 20 August 1993 (age 32) Alor Setar, Kedah, Malaysia
- Education: Universiti Putra Malaysia
- Height: 1.56 m (5 ft 1 1/2 in)
- Weight: 40 kg (88 lb)

Sport
- Country: Malaysia
- Sport: Track and field
- Event: Sprinting

Achievements and titles
- Personal bests: 60 m: 7.61 ^{NR} 100 m: 11.56 ^{NR} 200 m: 23.56
Medal record
Women's athletics
Asian Games
Bronze medal – third place	2022 Hangzhou	4×100 m relay
Southeast Asian Games
Silver medal – second place	2017 Kuala Lumpur	100 m
Silver medal – second place	2017 Kuala Lumpur	200 m
Bronze medal – third place	2015 Singapore	4×100 m relay
Bronze medal – third place	2019 Philippines	4×100 m relay
Bronze medal – third place	2023 Cambodia	200 m
Bronze medal – third place	2023 Cambodia	4×100 m relay
ASEAN University Games
Silver medal – second place	2014 Palembang	100 m
Silver medal – second place	2014 Palembang	200 m
Gold medal – first place	2016 Singapore	100 m

Zaidatul Husniah Zulkifli (born 20 August 1993) is a Malaysian sprinter who primarily competes in the 100 metres and 200 metres, and the 4 × 100 metres relay.

She competed at the 2016 Summer Olympics in Rio de Janeiro, in the women's 100 metres.

== Early years ==
Zaidatul Husniah was born on 20 August 1993 in Alor Setar, Kedah, the daughter of Zulkifli Hassan and Zalimah Ibrahim. She has a twin sister named Zaidatul Husna who was born 15 minutes earlier. Zaidatul Husniah received her early education at Sekolah Kebangsaan Seri Relau in Penang.

== Personal life ==
Zaidatul Husniah's twin sister, Zaidatul Husna, is also a national sprinter for Malaysia. She currently studies Physical Education at Universiti Putra Malaysia.

== International competitions ==
Year	Competition	Venue	Position	Event	Notes
Representing Malaysia
2014	ASEAN University Games	Palembang, Indonesia	2nd	100 m	11.62 (+1.8 m/s)
2015	Southeast Asian Games	Singapore		200 m	24.18 (+0.3 m/s)
2016	Asian Indoor Athletics Championships	Doha, Qatar	SF	60 m	7.61
2016	Olympic Games	Rio de Janeiro, Brazil	53/64	100 m	12.62 (−0.2 m/s)
2017	ASA Speed Series 2 Championship	Bloemfontein, South Africa	2nd	100 m	11.45 (−0.4 m/s) NR PB
2017	Southeast Asian Games	Kuala Lumpur, Malaysia	2nd	100 m	11.74
2017	Southeast Asian Games	Kuala Lumpur, Malaysia	2nd	200 m	23.64
2018	Commonwealth Games	Gold Coast, Australia	20th (sf)	100 m	11.84
2018	Asian Games	Jakarta, Indonesia	8th	100 m	11.61
2023	Asian Championships	Bangkok, Thailand	9th (sf)	100 m	11.67
2023	Asian Championships	Bangkok, Thailand	5th	4 × 100 m relay	45.56
2023	Asian Games	Hangzhou, China	17th (h)	100 m	12.11
2023	Asian Games	Hangzhou, China	14th (h)	200 m	24.86
2023	Asian Games	Hangzhou, China	3rd	4 × 100 m relay	45.01
2025	Asian Championships	Gumi, South Korea	8th	100 m	12.01
