= Supanich Poolkerd =

Thai sprinter (born 1997)

Personal information
- Born: 28 November 1997 (age 28) Nan, Thailand
- Height: 1.56 m (5 ft 1 in)
- Weight: 47 kg (104 lb)

Sport
- Country: Thailand
- Sport: Athletics
- Events: 100 metres, 200 metres, 400 metres
Medal record
Women's athletics
Representing Thailand
Asian Games
| Silver medal – second place | 2022 Hangzhou | 4 × 100 m relay |
| Silver medal – second place | 2026 Aichi–Nagoya | 4 × 100 m relay |
| Silver medal – second place | 2026 Aichi–Nagoya | Mixed 4 × 100 m relay |
Asian Championships
| Bronze medal – third place | 2023 Bangkok | 4 × 100 m relay |
| Bronze medal – third place | 2025 Gumi | 4 × 100 m relay |
Asian Indoor Championships
| Bronze medal – third place | 2024 Tehran | 60 m |
Asian Indoor and Martial Arts Games
| Gold medal – first place | 2017 Ashgabat | 4 × 400 m relay |
Asian Beach Games
| Gold medal – first place | 2026 Sanya | 4 × 60 m relay |
SEA Games
| Gold medal – first place | 2021 Hanoi | 4 × 100 m relay |
| Gold medal – first place | 2021 Hanoi | Mixed 4 × 400 m relay |
| Gold medal – first place | 2025 Bangkok | 4 × 100 m relay |
| Silver medal – second place | 2015 Singapore | 4 × 400 m relay |
| Silver medal – second place | 2017 Kuala Lumpur | 4 × 400 m relay |
| Silver medal – second place | 2019 Philippines | 4 × 400 m relay |
| Silver medal – second place | 2021 Hanoi | 4 × 400 m relay |
| Silver medal – second place | 2023 Phnom Penh | 100 m |
| Silver medal – second place | 2023 Phnom Penh | Mixed 4 × 400 m relay |
| Bronze medal – third place | 2017 Kuala Lumpur | 400 m |
| Bronze medal – third place | 2021 Hanoi | 100 m |
Asian U20 Championships
| Silver medal – second place | 2014 Taipei | 4 × 400 m relay |
| Silver medal – second place | 2016 Ho Chi Minh City | 200 m |
| Bronze medal – third place | 2016 Ho Chi Minh City | 4 × 400 m relay |

Supanich Poolkerd (Thai: ศุภานิช พูลเกิด, born 28 November 1997) is a Thai sprinter specialising in the 400 metres. She has won several medals at regional level.

== International competitions ==
| Year | Competition | Venue | Position | Event | Notes |
Representing Thailand
| 2014 | Asian Junior Championships | Taipei, Taiwan | 8th | 400 m | 56.47 |
| 2014 | Asian Junior Championships | Taipei, Taiwan | 2nd | 4 × 400 m relay | 3:42.27 |
| 2015 | Southeast Asian Games | Singapore | 2nd | 4 × 400 m relay | 3:36.82 |
| 2016 | Asian Junior Championships | Ho Chi Minh City, Vietnam | 2nd | 200 m | 24.41 |
| 2016 | Asian Junior Championships | Ho Chi Minh City, Vietnam | 3rd | 4 × 400 m relay | 3:50.79 |
| 2017 | Asian Championships | Bhubaneswar, India | 9th (h) | 400 m | 56.79 |
| 2017 | Asian Championships | Bhubaneswar, India | 5th | 4 × 400 m relay | 3:38.63 |
| 2017 | Southeast Asian Games | Kuala Lumpur, Malaysia | 3rd | 400 m | 54.55 |
| 2017 | Southeast Asian Games | Kuala Lumpur, Malaysia | 2nd | 4 × 400 m relay | 3:38.95 |
| 2017 | Universiade | Taipei, Taiwan | 7th | 4 × 400 m relay | 3:43.53 |
| 2017 | Asian Indoor and Martial Arts Games | Ashgabat, Turkmenistan | 4th | 400 m | 55.85 |
| 2017 | Asian Indoor and Martial Arts Games | Ashgabat, Turkmenistan | 1st | 4 × 400 m relay | 3:43.41 |
| 2018 | Asian Games | Jakarta, Indonesia | 13th (h) | 400 m | 56.62 |
| 2018 | Asian Games | Jakarta, Indonesia | 7th | 4 × 400 m relay | 3:47.89 |
| 2019 | Universiade | Naples, Italy | 31st (h) | 200 m | 24.45 |
| 2019 | Universiade | Naples, Italy | 6th | 4 × 100 m relay | 45.23 |
| 2023 | Southeast Asian Games | Cambodia | 2nd | 4 × 400 m relay | 3:23.02 |
| 2023 | Asian Championships | Bangkok, Thailand | 3rd | 4 × 100 m relay | 44.56 |
| 2023 | Asian Games | Hangzhou, China | 4th | 100 m | 11.35 |
| 2023 | Asian Games | Hangzhou, China | 2nd | 4 × 100 m relay | 44.32 |
| 2024 | Asian Indoor Championships | Tehran, Iran | 3rd | 60 m | 7.38 |
| 2024 | Taiwan Athletics Open | Taipei, Taiwan | 1st | 100 m | 11.72 |
| 2025 | Asian Championships | Gumi, South Korea | 10th (h) | 100 m | 11.75 |
| 2025 | Asian Championships | Gumi, South Korea | 3rd | 4 × 100 m relay | 44.26 |

== Personal bests ==
Outdoor

- 100 metres – 10.35 (Hangzhou 2017)
- 200 metres – 24.21 (Nakhon Ratchasima 2017)
- 400 metres – 54.55 (Kuala Lumpur 2017)

Indoor

- 400 metres – 55.85 (Ashgabat 2017)
