= Farzaneh Fasihi =

Iranian sprinter (born 1993)

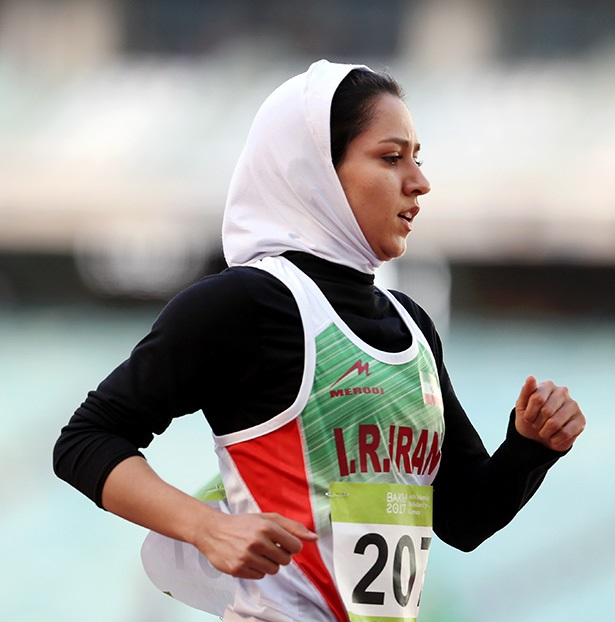
- Fasihi at the 2020 Summer Olympics

Personal information
- Native name: فرزانه فصیحی
- Born: 3 January 1993 (age 33) Isfahan, Iran
- Education: Physical education
- Height: 1.61 m (5 ft 3 in)
- Weight: 51 kg (112 lb)

Sport
- Country: Iran
- Sport: Track and field: Sprint
- Events: 60 metres; 100 metres; 200 metres; 4 × 400 metres relay

Achievements and titles
- Personal bests: Outdoor 100 m – 11.39 (2023); 200 m – 23.96 (2018); Indoor 60 m – 7.23 (2023)
Medal record
Women's athletics
Representing Iran
Asian Championships
Silver medal – second place	2023 Bangkok	100 m
Asian Indoor Championships
Gold medal – first place	2023 Astana	60 m
Gold medal – first place	2024 Tehran	60 m
Silver medal – second place	2016 Doha	4 × 400 m
Bronze medal – third place	2018 Tehran	60 m
Islamic Solidarity Games
Silver medal – second place	2021 Konya	100 m

Farzaneh Fasihi (Persian: فرزانه فصیحی, also Romanized as "Farzāneh Fasihi", Persian pronunciation: [fæɾzɒːˈne fæsiːˈhiː]; born 1993 in Isfahan) is an Iranian sprinter. Fasihi is the Iranian record holder of the 60 metres indoor with 7.20 seconds.

== Sporting career ==
Fasihi's first international experience was at the 2016 Asian Indoor Athletics Championships in Doha, finishing 5th in 60 m and winning the silver medal in 4 × 400 m relay. In 2017, she participated in the Islamic Solidarity Games in Baku and reached the semi-finals in 100 m. In 2018, she participated in Asian Indoor Athletics Championships in Tehran, where she won the bronze medal in the 60 m with a 7.44 seconds record.

She competed in the 2020 Summer Olympics (49th) and 2023 World Athletics Championships (44th) in the 100 m, finishing in the heats round.

=== Personal bests ===
Outdoor

- 100 metres – 11.39 (Bangkok, 2023)
- 200 metres – 23.97 (Tehran, 2018)
- 4 × 100 metres relay – 46.14 (NR) (Tehran, 2022)

Indoor

- 60 metres – 7.20 (NR) (Tehran, 2024)

=== International competitions ===
- Gold medal: Western Asia Championships, 2012, Dubai, UAE, in 4 × 400 m
- Silver medal: 2021 Islamic Solidarity Games, held in 2022, Konya, Turkey, in 100 m: 11.12 NR
- Silver medal: Asian Indoor Athletics Championships, 2016, Doha, Qatar, in 4 × 400 m: 4:06.51
- Silver medal: Western Asia Championships, 2012, Dubai, UAE, in 100 m
- Silver medal: Malaysian International Athletics Competition, 2012, Kuala Lumpur, Malaysia, in 4 × 400 m
- Silver medal: 21st Fajr International Indoor Athletics Championships, 2013, Tehran, Iran, in 60 m: 7.60
- Bronze medal: Asian Indoor Athletics Championships, 2018, Tehran, Iran, in 60 m: 7.44
- Bronze medal: Malaysian International Athletics Competition, 2012, Kuala Lumpur, Malaysia, in 100 m
- Bronze medal: Malaysian International Athletics Competition, 2012, Kuala Lumpur, Malaysia, in 200 m
- Bronze medal: Asian Indoor Championships, 2018, Tehran, Iran, in 60 m: 7.44
- 5th place: Asian Indoor Championships, 2016, Doha, Qatar, in 60 m

== Personal life ==
On 5 January 2026, Fasihi publicly supported the 2025–2026 Iranian protests on her Instagram, stating: "If a better future is to be built, it cannot be built by denying the suffering and oppression of the people."
