= Li Yuting =

Chinese sprinter (born 2002)

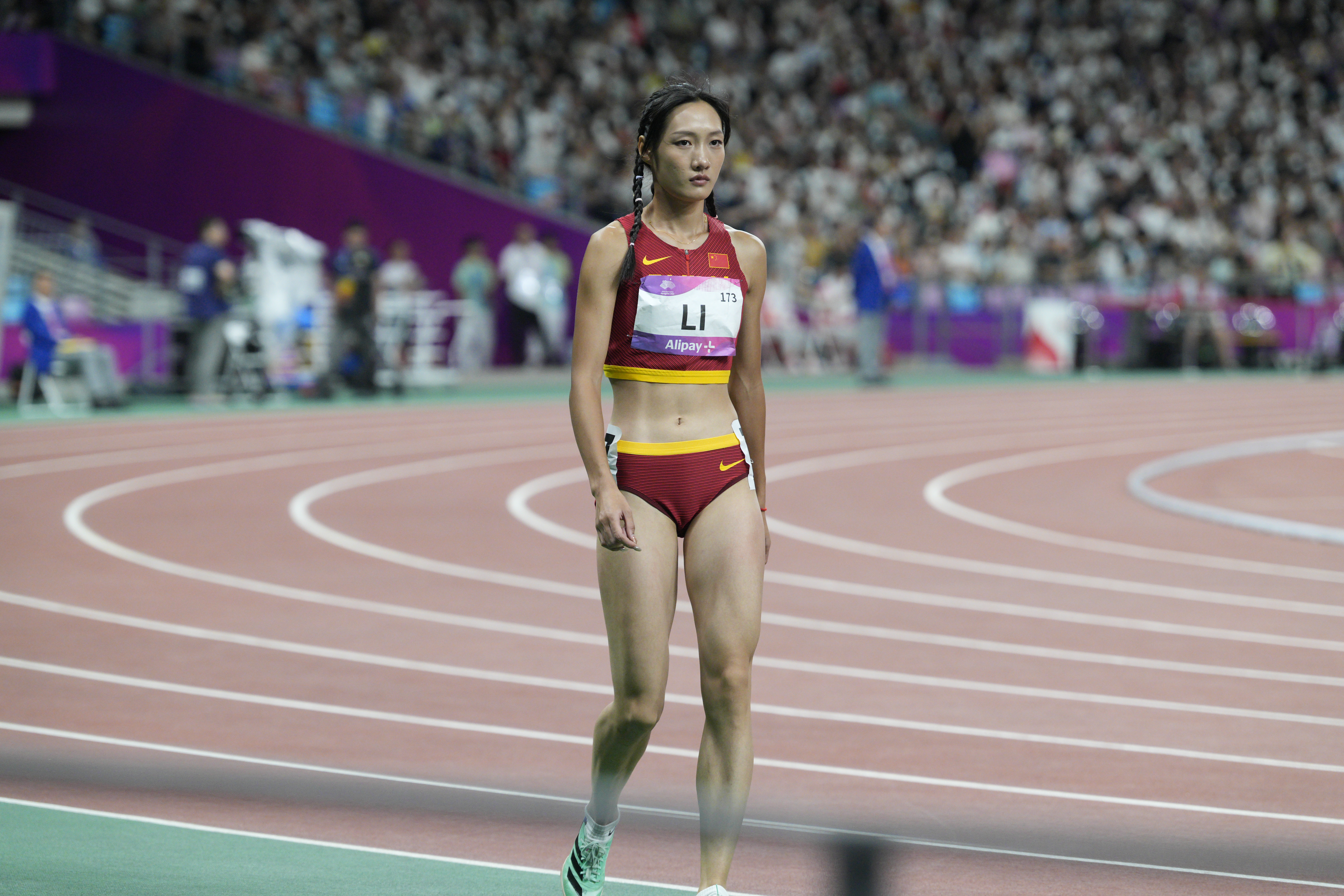
- Li at the Asian Games in 2023

Personal information
- Born: 3 May 2002 (age 24) Jieshou, Anhui, China
- Height: 175 cm (5 ft 9 in)

Sport
- Country: China
- Sport: Athletics
- Event(s): 100 metres, 200 metres

Achievements and titles
- Highest world ranking: 100 m: 200 m:
- Personal bests: 60 m (Indoor): 7.36s; 100 m: 11.44s; 200 m: 23.25s
Medal record
Women's Athletics
Representing China
Asian Games
Silver medal – second place	2022 Hangzhou	200 metres
Asian Championships
Gold medal – first place	2025 Gumi	4×100 m relay
Bronze medal – third place	2023 Bangkok	200 m
Bronze medal – third place	2025 Gumi	200 m

Li Yuting (born 3 May 2002) is a Chinese sprinter. She was one of 406 Chinese athletes to compete at the 2020 Tokyo Summer Olympics. Her team finished sixth place in the women's 4 x 100m relay. At the 2022 Asian Games, she won the silver for the 200m. This followed a third place finish at the same event earlier in the 2023 Asian Athletics Championships. At the 2024 Olympics, she clocked 23.24s in the repechage heats for the 200m.

== International rankings ==
Event	Highest ranking	Score
Women's 100m	382	1091
Women's 200m	172	1119
