= Loi Im Lan =

Macau sprinter (born 1998)

Personal information
- Born: 6 February 1998 (age 28)

Chinese name
- Traditional Chinese: 呂艷蘭
- Hanyu Pinyin: Lǚ Yànlán
- Yale Romanization: Léuih Yihm-làahn
- Jyutping: Leoi5 Yim6-lan4

Sport
- Sport: Athletics
- Events: 60 m, 100 m

Loi Im Lan (born 6 February 1998) is a sprinter from Macau. She represented her country at one outdoor and two indoor World Championships. In addition, she holds Macanese records on several distances.

== International competitions ==
| Year | Competition | Venue | Position | Event | Notes |
Representing Macau
| 2016 | World Indoor Championships | Portland, United States | 39th (h) | 60 m | 7.83 |
| 2016 | Asian Junior Championships | Ho Chi Minh City, Vietnam | 8th | 100 m | 12.17 |
| 2017 | Asian Championships | Bhubaneswar, India | 21st (h) | 100 m | 13.27 |
| 2017 | World Championships | London, United Kingdom | 37th (h) | 100 m | 12.00 |
| 2017 | Asian Indoor and Martial Arts Games | Ashgabat, Turkmenistan | 13th (h) | 60 m | 7.72 |
| 2018 | World Indoor Championships | Birmingham, United Kingdom | 42nd (h) | 60 m | 7.69 |
| 2018 | Asian Games | Jakarta, Indonesia | 17th (h) | 100 m | 11.96 |
| 2018 | Asian Games | Jakarta, Indonesia | 20th (h) | 200 m | 24.73 |
| 2019 | Universiade | Naples, Italy | 41st (h) | 100 m | 12.12 |
| 2019 | World Championships | Doha, Qatar | 43rd (h) | 100 m | 12.10 |
| 2023 | Asian Indoor Championships | Astana, Kazakhstan | 8th (h) | 60 m | 7.45 |
| 2023 | Asian Championships | Bangkok, Thailand | 10th (sf) | 100 m | 11.85 |
| 2023 | World University Games | Chengdu, China | 15th (sf) | 100 m | 11.70 |
| 2023 | Asian Games | Hangzhou, China | 13th (h) | 100 m | 11.79 |
| 2023 | Asian Games | Hangzhou, China | 16th (h) | 200 m | 25.03 |
| 2024 | World Indoor Championships | Glasgow, United Kingdom | 42nd (h) | 60 m | 7.46 |
| 2026 | World Indoor Championships | Toruń, Poland | 44th (h) | 60 m | 7.45 |

== Personal bests ==
Outdoor

- 100 metres – 11.54 (+0.4 m/s, Guangzhou, China 2025) NR
- 200 metres – 24.47 (-0.1 m/s, Guangzhou, China 2025) NR
- 400 metres – 57.23 (Macau 2017)

Indoor

- 60 metres – 7.40 (Xi'an 2026) NR
- 200 metres – 24.47 (Macau 2017) NR
