= Chen Yujie =

Chinese sprinter

Personal information
- Born: 29 December 2008 (age 17) Ningbo, Zhejiang, China

Sport
- Sport: Athletics
- Event: Sprint

Achievements and titles
- Personal bests: 60 m: 7.26s (2025); 100 m: 11.06s (2026) AU20R; 200 m: 22.84s (2026)
Medal record
Women's athletics
Representing China
Asian Games
Gold medal – first place	2026 Aichi–Nagoya	100 m
Gold medal – first place	2026 Aichi–Nagoya	4 × 100 m relay
Gold medal – first place	2026 Aichi–Nagoya	Mixed 4 × 100 m relay
Silver medal – second place	2026 Aichi–Nagoya	200 m
Asian Championships
Gold medal – first place	2025 Gumi	200 m
Gold medal – first place	2025 Gumi	4 × 100 m relay
Asian U20 Championships
Gold medal – first place	2024 Dubai	100 metres

Chen Yujie (Chinese: 陈妤颉, born 29 December 2008) is a Chinese sprinter. She is the Asian youth record holder in the 100 metres and won the 100 metres gold medal and 200 metres silver medal at the 2026 Asian Games as a 17 year-old, winning four medals in total at the Games after the relay races.

She became senior Chinese national champion over the 100 metres distance in 2024, as well as winning the gold medal at the 2024 Asian U20 Athletics Championships and the 2025 National Games of China, she was 100 metres champion at the 2025 Asian Athletics Championships.

== Early life ==
She was born in the city of Ningbo, in east China's Zhejiang Province. Both of her parents are former athletes.

== Career ==
In 2023, she ran times of 11.56 seconds and 11.43 seconds in the 100 metres races at the World School Sport Games and the Student (Youth) Games of the People's Republic of China, respectively.

In March 2024, she won the Chinese Athletics Indoor Championships over 60 metres, with a personal best time of 7.26 seconds in Tianjin. In April 2024, she won the 100 metres at the 2024 Asian U20 Athletics Championships in Dubai, United Arab Emirates, in a time of 11.32 seconds, breaking the championship record also her own national youth record of 11.43 seconds and the U18 Asian youth record of 11.42 seconds. In June 2024, she won the 100 metres at the Chinese national championships with a new personal best and Asian under-18 record time of 11.29 seconds. She competed at the 2024 World Athletics U20 Championships in Lima, Peru in August 2024.

She made her senior championship debut as a sixteen year-old at the 2025 World Athletics Indoor Championships in Nanjing, where she was the youngest athlete at the championships. She ran in the same heat at Turkmenistan's Valentina Meredova who previously competed at the 2008 Olympic Games, before Yujie was born. She finished fourth in the 200 metres at the 2025 Xiamen Diamond League event in China, with a personal best time of 22.99 seconds, in April 2025. She competed at the 2025 World Athletics Relays in Guangzhou in the Women's 4 × 100 metres relay in May 2025. In September 2025, she competed in the 200 metres at the 2025 World Championships in Tokyo, Japan. She also ran in the women's 4 × 100 metres relay at the championships. On 17 November 2025, she won the 100 metres title at the 2025 National Games of China in Guangzhou, running a new Asian under-20 record time of 11.10s.

In May 2026, she ran at the 2026 World Athletics Relays in the women's 4 × 100 metres relay in Gaborone, Botswana. On 16 May, she ran a personal best 22.84 seconds (+0.3) for the 200 metres at the 2026 Shanghai Diamond League. On August 12, 2026, she ran a personal best in the 100 m dash in the finals of the China National Athletics Championships, finishing with a time of 11.08 seconds. This surpassed her previous personal best of 11.10, and once again broke the Asian under-20 100 m record. On 25 September 2026, still aged 17 year-old, she ran 11.06 seconds in the 100 m final at the 2026 Asian Games in Nagoya, Japan to win the gold medal. Her time broke the previous Games record of 11.15 seconds, as well as lowering her own Asian under-20 100 m record. Later at the Games, she went on to win the silver medal in the 200 metres final, and won a third medal with gold in the women's 4 × 100 metres relay with the China team. She won a fourth medal at the Games after anchoring the mixed 4 × 100 metres relay team to the gold medal.

== Athletics achievements ==
Information from her World Athletics profile unless otherwise noted.

=== Personal bests ===
Type	Distance	Time (s)	Wind (m/s)	Venue	Date	Notes
Individual events
Indoor	60 metres	7.24	—N/a	Xi'an, China	7 March 2006	
Indoor	200 metres sh	23.76	—N/a	Jinan, China	19 February 2025	
Outdoor	100 metres	11.06	-0.4	Nagoya, Japan	25 September 2026	AU20R
Outdoor	200 metres	22.84	+0.3	Shaoxing, China	16 May 2026	
Team events
Outdoor	4 × 100 metres relay	42.61	—N/a	Gaborone, Botswana	3 May 2026	
Outdoor	4 × 200 metres relay	1:34.80	—N/a	Shaoxing, China	21 September 2024	

=== International competitions ===
Representing China
Year	Competition	Venue	Position	Event	Time	Notes
2024	Asian U20 Championships	Dubai, United Arab Emirates	1st	100 m	11.32	AU20R CR
2024	World U20 Championships	Lima, Peru	19th (sf)	100 m	11.79	
2025	World Indoor Championships	Nanjing, China	27th (h)	60 m	7.34	
2025	World Relays	Guangzhou, China	—	4 × 100 m relay	DQ	
2025	Asian Championships	Gumi, South Korea	1st	200 m	22.97	PB
2025	Asian Championships	Gumi, South Korea	1st	4 × 100 m relay	43.28	SB
2025	World Championships	Tokyo, Japan	35th (h)	200 m	23.26	
2025	World Championships	Tokyo, Japan	9th (h)	4 × 100 m relay	42.94	SB
2026	World Relays	Gaborone, Botswana	5th	4 × 100 m relay	42.61	SB
2026	Asian Games	Nagoya, Japan	1st	100 m	11.06	AU20R GR
2026	Asian Games	Nagoya, Japan	2nd	200 m	22.93	
2026	Asian Games	Nagoya, Japan	1st	4 × 100 m relay	42.96	
2026	Asian Games	Nagoya, Japan	1st	Mixed 4 × 100 m relay	40.78	GR SB
