= Azreen Nabila Alias =

Malaysian athlete

Personal information
- Full name: Azreen Nabila binti Alias
- Nationality: Malaysian
- Born: 29 June 2000 (age 25) Kuala Terengganu, Terengganu, Malaysia

Sport
- Country: Malaysia
- Sport: Athletics (track and field)
- Event: Sprinting
Medal record
Women's athletics
Representing Malaysia
Asian Games
Bronze medal – third place	2022 Hangzhou	4×100 m relay
Southeast Asian Games
Bronze medal – third place	2019 Philippines	4×100 m relay
Bronze medal – third place	2021 Hanoi	4×100 m relay
Bronze medal – third place	2023 Cambodia	4×100 m relay

Azreen Nabila binti Alias (born 29 June 2000) is a Malaysian athlete.

She competed at the Athletics at the 2020 Summer Olympics – Women's 100 metres. She stated going into the event her goal was to break her personal best of 11.81 seconds which she set winning the 2018 Malaysia Games. She achieved this, running 11.77 seconds and qualifying second from her preliminary heat to reach the first round.
