= Ge Manqi =

Chinese sprinter (born 1997)

Ge Manqi 葛曼棋
Personal information
- Born: 13 October 1997 (age 28) Sanming, Fujian, China
- Height: 1.60 m (5 ft 3 in)
- Weight: 48 kg (106 lb)

Sport
- Country: China
- Sport: Athletics
Medal record
World Relays
Silver medal – second place	2019 Yokohama	4×200 m relay
Asian Games
Gold medal – first place	2022 Hangzhou	100 metres
Gold medal – first place	2022 Hangzhou	4×100 m relay
Silver medal – second place	2018 Jakarta-Palembang	4×100 m relay
Asian Championships
Gold medal – first place	2019 Doha	4×100 m relay
Gold medal – first place	2023 Bangkok	4×100 m relay
Bronze medal – third place	2023 Bangkok	100 m
Summer World University Games
Gold medal – first place	2021 Chengdu	4×100 m
Asian Youth Games
Gold medal – first place	2013 Nanjing	100 m

Ge Manqi (Chinese: 葛曼棋; pinyin: Gě Mànqí; born on 13 October 1997) is a Chinese sprinter. In the Beijing IAAF Challenge on 18 May 2016, Ge Manqi, along with Yuan Qiqi, Wei Yongli and Liang Xiaojing secured first place in the women's 4 × 100 metres relay. She achieved a time of 11.48 seconds in the 100m event during the 2016 National Track Championships in Chongqing, qualifying her for the 2016 Summer Olympics in Rio de Janeiro.
