= List of Asian Games records in athletics =

The Asian Games is a quadrennial event which began in 1951. The Olympic Council of Asia accepts only athletes who are representing one of the organisation's member states (most of which are within Asia) and recognises records set at editions of the Asian Games. The Games records in athletics are the best marks set in competitions at the Games. The athletics events at the Games are divided into four groups: track events (including sprints, middle- and long-distance running, hurdling and relays), field events (including javelin, discus, hammer, pole vault, long and triple jumps), road events and combined events (the heptathlon and decathlon).

== Men's records ==
Event	Record	Name	Nationality	Date	Games	Ref.
100 m	9.90 (+0.1 m/s)	Puripol Boonson	Thailand	25 September 2026	2026 Aichi-Nagoya	
200 m	19.88 (−0.3 m/s)	Puripol Boonson	Thailand	27 September 2026	2026 Aichi-Nagoya	
400 m	44.46	Yousef Masrahi	Saudi Arabia	27 September 2014	2014 Incheon	
800 m	1:44.48	Ko Ochiai	Japan	29 September 2026	2026 Aichi-Nagoya	
1500 m	3:36.35	Kazuto Iizawa	Japan	28 September 2026	2026 Aichi-Nagoya	
5000 m	13:17.40	Birhanu Balew	Bahrain	4 October 2023	2022 Hangzhou	
10,000 m	27:32.72	Bilisuma Shugi Gelassa	Bahrain	26 November 2010	2010 Guangzhou	
Marathon	2:08:21	Takeyuki Nakayama	Japan	5 October 1986	1986 Seoul	
110 m hurdles	13.09 (+1.1 m/s)	Liu Xiang	China	24 November 2010	2010 Guangzhou	
400 m hurdles	47.66	Abderrahman Samba	Qatar	27 August 2018	2018 Jakarta	
3000 m steeplechase	8:17.36	Ryuji Miura	Japan	28 September 2026	2026 Aichi-Nagoya	
High jump	2.35 m	Mutaz Barsham	Qatar	29 September 2014	2014 Incheon	
High jump	2.35 m	Mutaz Barsham	Qatar	4 October 2023	2022 Hangzhou	
Pole vault	5.91 m	EJ Obiena	Philippines	29 September 2026	2026 Aichi–Nagoya	
Long jump	8.24 m (+0.7 m/s)	Wang Jianan	China	26 August 2018	2018 Jakarta	
Triple jump	17.42 m (−0.2 m/s)	Su Wen	China	26 September 2026	2026 Aichi-Nagoya	
Shot put	20.81 m	Mohammadreza Tayebi	Iran	26 September 2026	2026 Aichi-Nagoya	
Discus throw	67.99 m	Ehsan Hadadi	Iran	24 November 2010	2010 Guangzhou	
Hammer throw	78.72 m	Koji Murofushi	Japan	8 October 2002	2002 Busan	
Javelin throw	89.15 m	Zhao Qinggang	China	2 October 2014	2014 Incheon	
Decathlon	8384 pts	Dmitriy Karpov	Kazakhstan	10–11 December 2006	2006 Doha	
Decathlon	100m (wind) / Long jump (wind) / Shot put / High jump / 400m / 110m H (wind) / Discus / Pole vault / Javelin / 1500m; 10.81 / 7.63 m / 16.41 m / 2.03 m / 48.28 / 14.47 / 47.87 m / 4.80 m / 56.66 m / 4:47.74					
20 km walk (road)	1:19:45	Wang Zhen	China	28 September 2014	2014 Incheon	
35 km walk (road)	2:31:28	Wang Qin	China	4 October 2023	2022 Hangzhou	
50 km walk (road)	3:40:19	Takayuki Tanii	Japan	1 October 2014	2014 Incheon	
4 × 100 m relay	37.99	Chen Shiwei; Xie Zhenye; Su Bingtian; Zhang Peimeng	China	2 October 2014	2014 Incheon	
4 × 400 m relay	3:00.56	Abderrahman Samba; Mohamed Nasir Abbas; Mohamed Mohamed; Abdalelah Haroun	Qatar	30 August 2018	2018 Jakarta	

Key:
^{WR} World record	^{AR} Area record	^{NR} National record	^{PB} Athlete's personal best

== Women's records ==
Event	Record	Name	Nationality	Date	Games	Ref.
100 m	11.06 (−0.4 m/s)	Chen Yujie	China	25 September 2026	2026 Aichi-Nagoya	
200 m	22.48	Damayanthi Dharsha	Sri Lanka	18 December 1998	1998 Bangkok	
400 m	49.20	Salwa Eid Naser	Bahrain	26 September 2026	2026 Aichi-Nagoya	
800 m	1:59.02	Margarita Matsko	Kazakhstan	1 October 2014	2014 Incheon	
1500 m	4:04.50	Nelly Korir	Bahrain	26 September 2026	2026 Aichi-Nagoya	
5000 m	14:40.41	Sun Yingjie	China	12 October 2002	2002 Busan	
10,000 m	30:28.26	Sun Yingjie	China	8 October 2002	2002 Busan	
Marathon	2:21:47	Naoko Takahashi	Japan	6 December 1998	1998 Bangkok	
100 m hurdles	12.63	Olga Shishigina	Kazakhstan	19 December 1998	1998 Bangkok	
400 m hurdles	54.31	Mariam Kareem	UAE	28 September 2026	2026 Aichi-Nagoya	
3000 m steeplechase	9:04.36	Winfred Yavi	Bahrain	27 September 2026	2026 Aichi-Nagoya	
High jump	1.96 m	Svetlana Radzivil	Uzbekistan	29 August 2018	2018 Jakarta	
Pole vault	4.63 m	Li Ling	China	2 October 2023	2022 Hangzhou	
Long jump	6.91 m	Yao Weili	China	15 October 1994	1994 Hiroshima	
Triple jump	14.78 m	Olga Rypakova	Kazakhstan	25 November 2010	2010 Guangzhou	
Shot put	20.55 m	Sui Xinmei	China	1 October 1990	1990 Beijing	
Discus throw	67.93 m	Feng Bin	China	1 October 2023	2022 Hangzhou	
Hammer throw	78.27 m	Zhang Jiale	China	29 September 2026	2026 Aichi-Nagoya	
Javelin throw	70.46 m	Yan Ziyi	China	27 September 2026	2026 Aichi-Nagoya	
Heptathlon	6360 pts	Ghada Shouaa	Syria	10–11 October 1994	1994 Hiroshima	
Heptathlon	100m H (wind) / High jump / Shot put / 200m (wind) / Long jump (wind) / Javelin / 800m; 14.55 / 1.81 m / 14.33 m / 24.67 / 6.24 m / 51.92 m / 2:13.59					
20 km walk	1:29:15	Yang Jiayu	China	29 August 2018	2018 Jakarta	
35 km walk (road)	2:45:13	Qieyang Shijie	China	4 October 2023	2022 Hangzhou	
4 × 100 m relay	42.73 NR	Iman Essa Jasim; Edidiong Odiong; Hajar Alkhaldi; Salwa Eid Naser	Bahrain	30 August 2018	2018 Jakarta	
4 × 400 m relay	3:27.65	Muna Saad Mubarak; Oluwakemi Mujidat Adekoya; Zenab Moussa Ali Mahamat; Salwa Eid Naser	Bahrain	4 October 2023	2022 Hangzhou	

== Mixed ==
Event	Record	Athlete	Nationality	Date	Games	Ref.
35 km walk Team (road)	5:16:41	Wang Qin; Qieyang Shijie	China	4 October 2023	2022 Hangzhou	
4 × 100 m relay	40.78	Chen Jinfeng; Liu Guoyi; Shi Junhao; Chen Yujie	China	29 September 2026	2026 Aichi-Nagoya	
4 × 400 m relay	3:12.87	Musa Isah; Aisha Abdullah; Alaa Sami; Salwa Eid Naser	Bahrain	24 September 2026	2026 Aichi-Nagoya	

Key:
^{WR} World record	^{AR} Area record	^{NR} National record	^{PB} Athlete's personal best
