= Shanti Pereira =

Singaporean sprinter

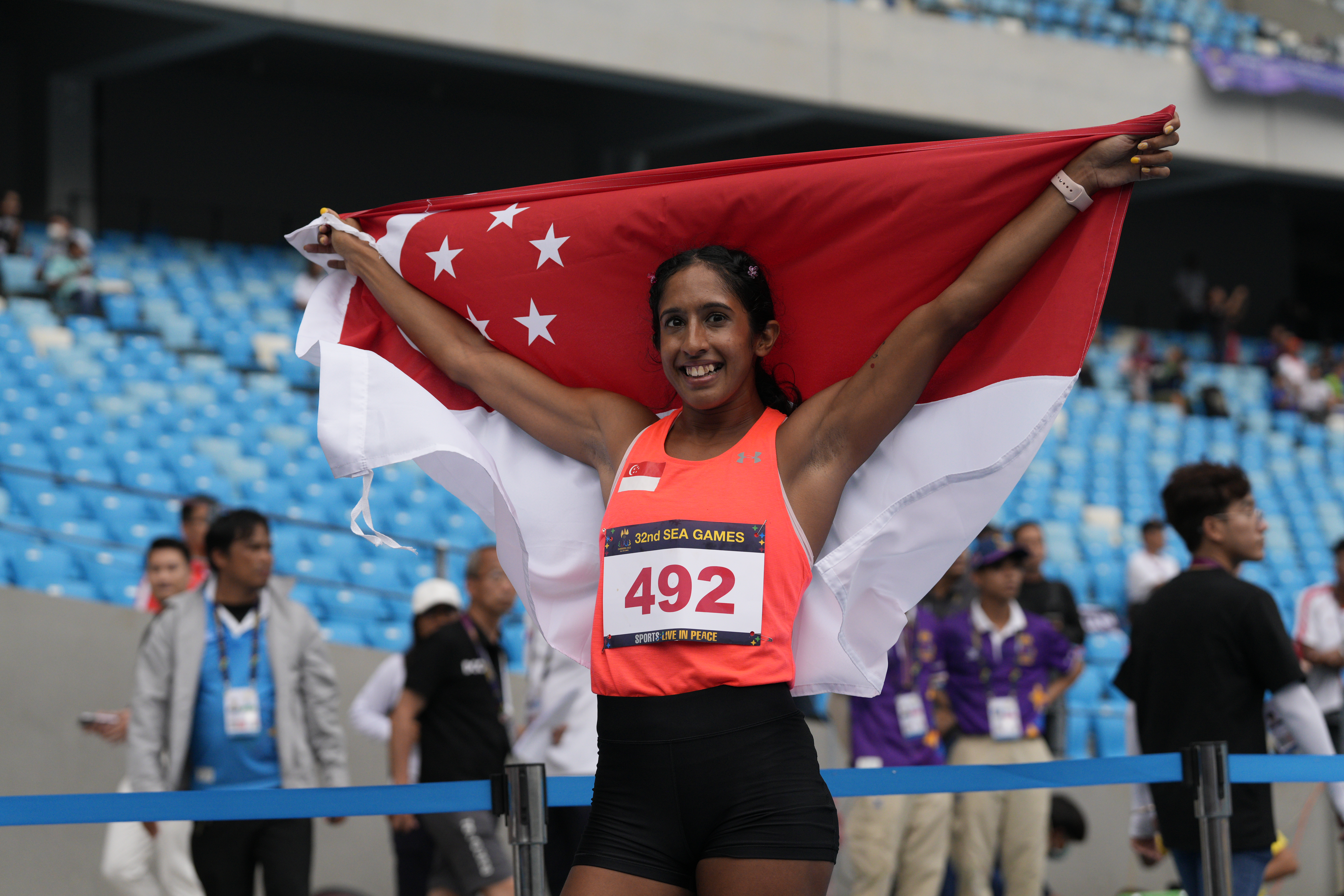
- Pereira after winning the 200 m at the 2023 SEA Games

Personal information
- Full name: Veronica Shanti Pereira
- Born: 20 September 1996 (age 30) Singapore
- Education: Singapore Management University
- Height: 1.64 m (5 ft 5 in)
- Weight: 54 kg (119 lb)

Sport
- Country: Singapore
- Sport: Athletics
- Events: 100 m, 200 m, 4 × 100 m, 4 × 400 m

Achievements and titles
- Highest world ranking: 100 m: 32nd (2023); 200 m: 20th (2023)
- Personal bests: 60 m (Indoor): 7.61 s (NR); 100 m: 11.20 s (NR); 200 m: 22.57 s (NR); 400 m: 53.67 s (NR)
Medal record
Women's Athletics
Representing Singapore
Asian Games
Gold medal – first place	2022 Hangzhou	200 m
Gold medal – first place	2026 Aichi–Nagoya	200 m
Silver medal – second place	2022 Hangzhou	100 m
Silver medal – second place	2026 Aichi–Nagoya	100 m
Asian Championships
Gold medal – first place	2023 Bangkok	100 m
Gold medal – first place	2023 Bangkok	200 m
Silver medal – second place	2025 Gumi	100 m
Silver medal – second place	2025 Gumi	200 m
SEA Games
Gold medal – first place	2015 Singapore	200 m
Gold medal – first place	2021 Vietnam	200 m
Gold medal – first place	2023 Cambodia	100 m
Gold medal – first place	2023 Cambodia	200 m
Gold medal – first place	2025 Thailand	100 m
Gold medal – first place	2025 Thailand	200 m
Silver medal – second place	2021 Vietnam	100 m
Bronze medal – third place	2015 Singapore	100 m
Bronze medal – third place	2017 Kuala Lumpur	100 m
Bronze medal – third place	2017 Kuala Lumpur	200 m
Bronze medal – third place	2019 Philippines	200 m
Bronze medal – third place	2019 Philippines	100 m
ASEAN University Games
Gold medal – first place	2018 Naypyidaw	100 m
Gold medal – first place	2018 Naypyidaw	200 m

Veronica Shanti Pereira (born 20 September 1996) is a Singaporean track and field athlete who specialises in the 100 m, 200 m, 4 × 100 m, and 4 × 400 m. She holds the 100 m national record (11.20 s), 200 m national record (22.57 s), 400 m national record (53.67 s), 4 × 100 m national record (44.96 s), 200 m SEA Games record (22.69 s), and the 200 m Asian Athletics Championships games record (22.70 s). She was ranked 1st in Asia in 2023 for both the 100 and 200 m based on World Athletics' records.

== Early life and education ==
Born in Singapore, Pereira was introduced to track and field when she was nine at CHIJ (Katong) Primary, after watching her elder sister compete in a school race. She subsequently enrolled in Singapore Sports School, where she led them to the C Division team championship at the National School Games. Pereira then studied for a diploma in sports and leisure management offered jointly by Republic Polytechnic and Singapore Sports School. In 2017, she was awarded the Yip Pin Xiu Scholarship to study accountancy at Singapore Management University. In 2018, she lost the scholarship, being unable to keep the minimum GPA requirements. Pereira eventually graduated in 2021.

== Running career ==
=== Youth ===
Pereira set a number of records in her youth. She holds the U-23 records for the 100 m (11.80s) and 200 m (23.99s) and was a member of the teams which set the records for the 4 × 100 m (46.64s) and 4 × 400 m (3:44.80) relays; the U-19 records for the 100 m (11.89s) and 200 m (23.99s); the U-17 records for the 100 m (12.21s) and 200 m (24.92s); and U-15 records for the 100 m (12.68s).

In 2013, Pereira became the first female Singaporean to run the 100 m in under 12 seconds when she clocked 11.89s at the 2013 World Youth Championships in Athletics in Donetsk, Ukraine. At the 2013 Southeast Asian Games, she came in fourth in the 100 m final. In 2014, she became the first female Singaporean to run the 200 m in under 24 seconds when she clocked 23.99s at the Asian Junior Athletics Championships.

=== 2015–2022: SEA Games success ===
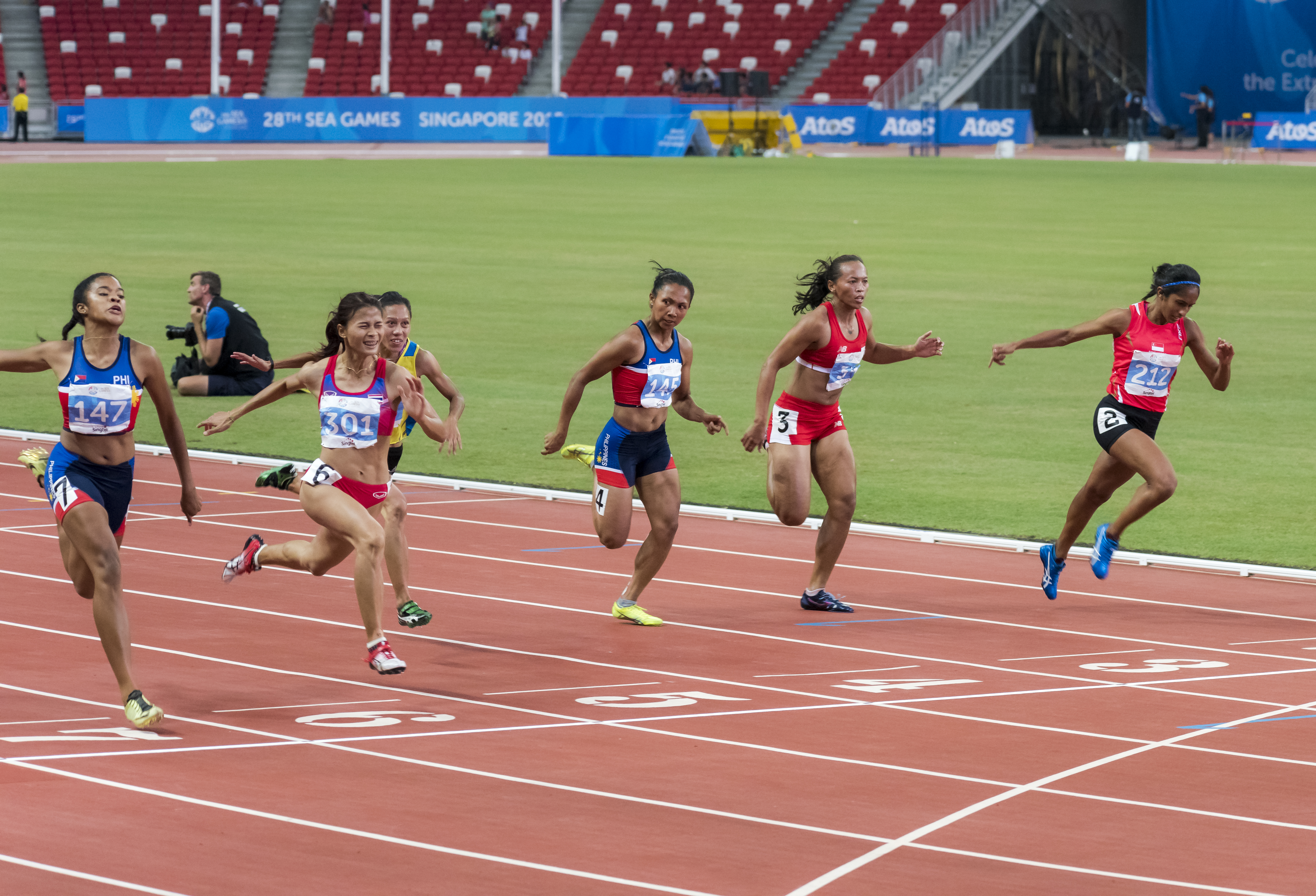
Pereira in the 100 metres final at the 2015 SEA Games, in which she won the bronze medal

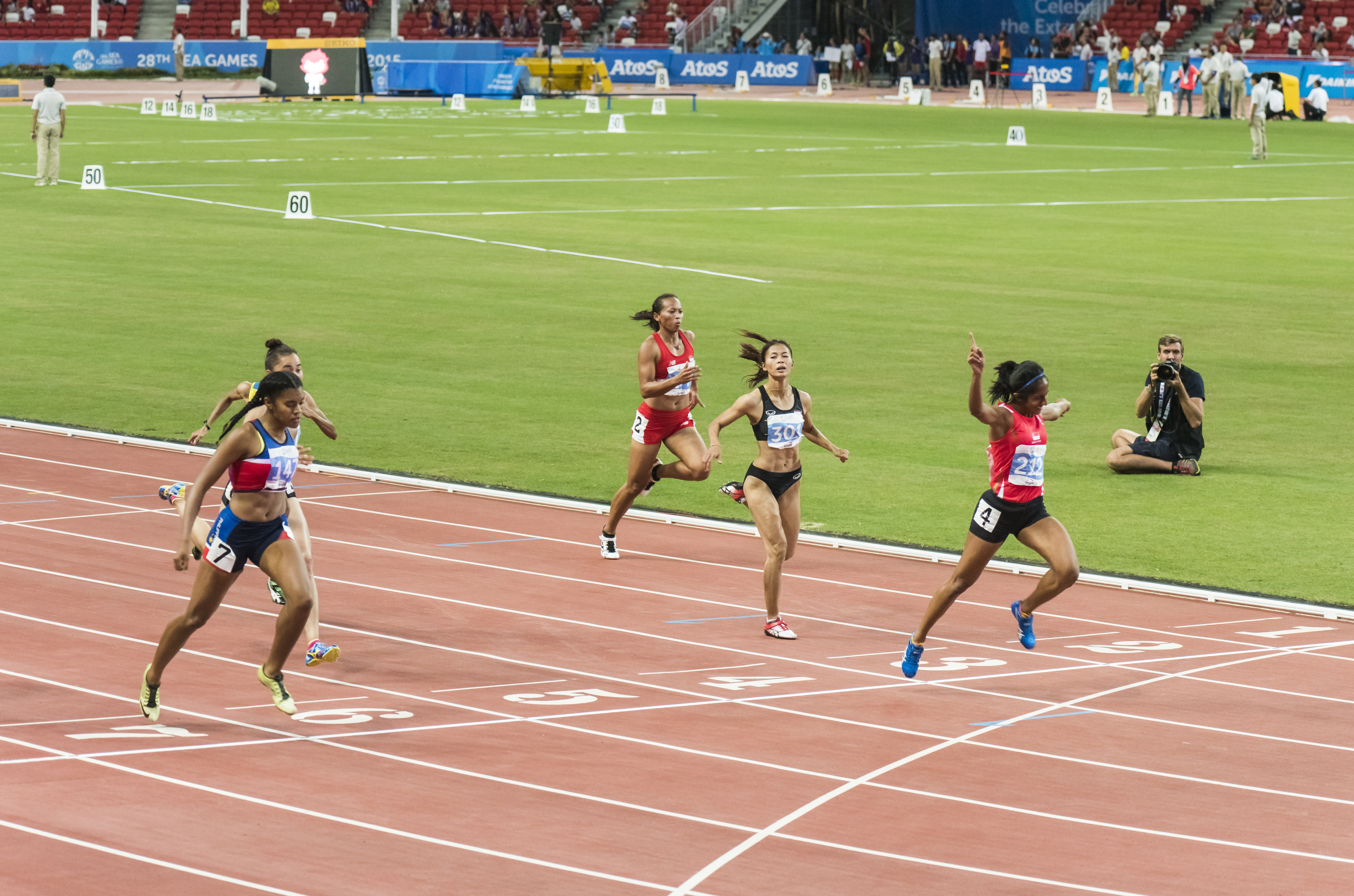
Pereira in the 200 metres final at the 2015 SEA Games, in which she won the gold medal and rewrote her national record

At the 2015 Southeast Asian Games, Pereira won the bronze medal in the 100 m with a time of 11.88s, Singapore's first medal in the event in 42 years. She also won the gold medal in the 200 m with a time of 23.60s, rewriting the national record she had set in the day's heats (23.82s); this was Singapore's first gold medal in a sprint event in the SEA Games in 42 years. Although the Singapore quartet which she was part of came in fourth in the 4 × 400 m relay, it broke the oldest record in Singapore's athletics history with a time of 3:40.58. In her final event, the 4 × 100 m relay, the team came in fourth, but set a new national record of 45.41s. At the 2017 Southeast Asian Games, Pereira won the bronze medal in both the 100 m and 200 m; she repeated this double at the 2019 Southeast Asian Games.

In 2021, Pereira qualified for the 200 m in the 2020 Summer Olympics through universality places. She finished 6th in her heat with a season-best time of 23.96s. At the 2021 Southeast Asian Games, Pereira won the gold medal at the 200 m with a time of 23.52s, rewriting the national record she had set in the 2015 Southeast Asian Games. In the 100 m, she won the silver medal, clocking 11.62s.

At the 2022 Commonwealth Games, Pereira clocked 11.48s in the 100 m heats, breaking her previous record of 11.58s set in 2019. However, her time of 11.57s in the next round was unable to earn her qualification for the final. In the 200 m, she also broke her previous record with a time of 23.46s. She clocked the same time in the semifinal, placing 11th overall among 24 runners. In October 2022, Sport Singapore announced that Pereira was one of seven athletes who had joined the 2022 Sport Excellence (Spex) Scholarship programme; she was previously a Spex scholar between 2016 and 2018. She had lost the Spex scholarship in 2018 as she was unable to medal at the 2018 Asian Games.

=== 2023: breaking records ===
2023 was a watershed year for Pereira. On 3 March, she clocked 11.46s in the 100 m heats of the New Zealand Track and Field Championships to rewrite her national mark. While she ran 11.44s to win the bronze in the final, this was not recognised as a record due to the strong tailwind (3.4 m/s). On 25 March, she clocked 23.16s to break her 200 m national record after finishing third at the Brisbane Track Class. On 31 March, she rewrote her 100 m national record after running 11.38s at the Australia Open; she lowered the mark to 11.37s when she won the final the next day. On 2 April, she ran 22.89s in the 200 m at the same meet, rewriting her national mark yet again and becoming the first Singaporean woman to run under 23s. 2023 was also the year Pereira became the first Singaporean to top World Athletics' women's 100 m outdoor rankings in Asia.

At the 2023 SEA Games in Phnom Penh, Pereira successfully defended her 200 m title; her time of 22.69s not only rewrote the Singapore record, but the SEA Games record as well. She also won the 100 m, becoming the first Singaporean woman to win the sprint double at the SEA Games. In the same month, she ran 11.34s and 11.26s in the heats and final respectively at the International Pentecost Sports Meeting in Rehlingen, rewriting her national mark twice in the same day and setting a Southeast Asian best.

==== 2023 Asian Athletics Championships ====
On 14 July, Pereira won the 100 m at the Asian Athletics Championships with a time of 11.20s, rewriting her national record for the sixth time in 2023 and becoming the first Singaporean to win a gold at the championships; this also ended Singapore's 16-year medal drought at the continental meet. Two days later, Pereira won the 200 m as well, with a time of 22.70s, setting a new championship record. On 30 July, she claimed gold in the 200 m at the Mittsommernacht Athletics meet in Berlin with a time of 23.32s, beating Gina Lückenkemper, the reigning European 100 m and 4 × 100 m champion. On 5 August, Pereira clocked 23.38s to win the 200 m at the Folksam Grand Prix held in Malmö, Sweden; she narrowly missed out on the 100 m gold, finishing 2nd with a time of 11.50s.

==== 2023 World Athletics Championships ====
Following her results throughout the year, Pereira became the first Singaporean to qualify for the World Athletics Championships on merit. She had competed at three previous world championships, but as a wild card entrant. Her qualification for the 2023 World Athletics Championships was via her world rankings position of 23rd in the world for the women's 200 m and 47th for the women's 100 m. She became the first Singaporean to quality for the Championships on merit and also the first to compete in more than one event at the World Athletics Championships. At the competition, Pereira finished 4th in her 100 m heats with a time of 11.33s. She missed out on a place in the semi-finals, placing 31st out of 54 runners overall and achieved the highest placing among all the Asian athletes who took part in the 100 m. However, she qualified for the 200 m semi-final with a new national record time of 22.57s, placing 12th overall in a field of 44. This made her the first Singaporean to ever progress to a semi-final at the World Championships. Pereira also qualified for the 2024 Paris Olympics by meeting the Olympic Qualifying mark of 22.57s, thus becoming the first Singaporean to qualify for the 200 m event at the Olympics. Pereira ended her World Championships outing, finishing 6th in her semi-final heats, clocking 22.79s. She placed 17th overall in the semi-finals, in a field of 23, also achieving the highest placing among all the Asian athletes who took part in the 200 m. On 4 September, Pereira finished 4th in both the 100 m and 200 m at the Galà dei Castelli in Bellinzona with a time of 11.43s and 22.88s respectively. Two days later, she finished 6th in the 100 m at the Palio Città della Quercia in Rovereto with a time of 11.52s.

==== 19th Asian Games ====
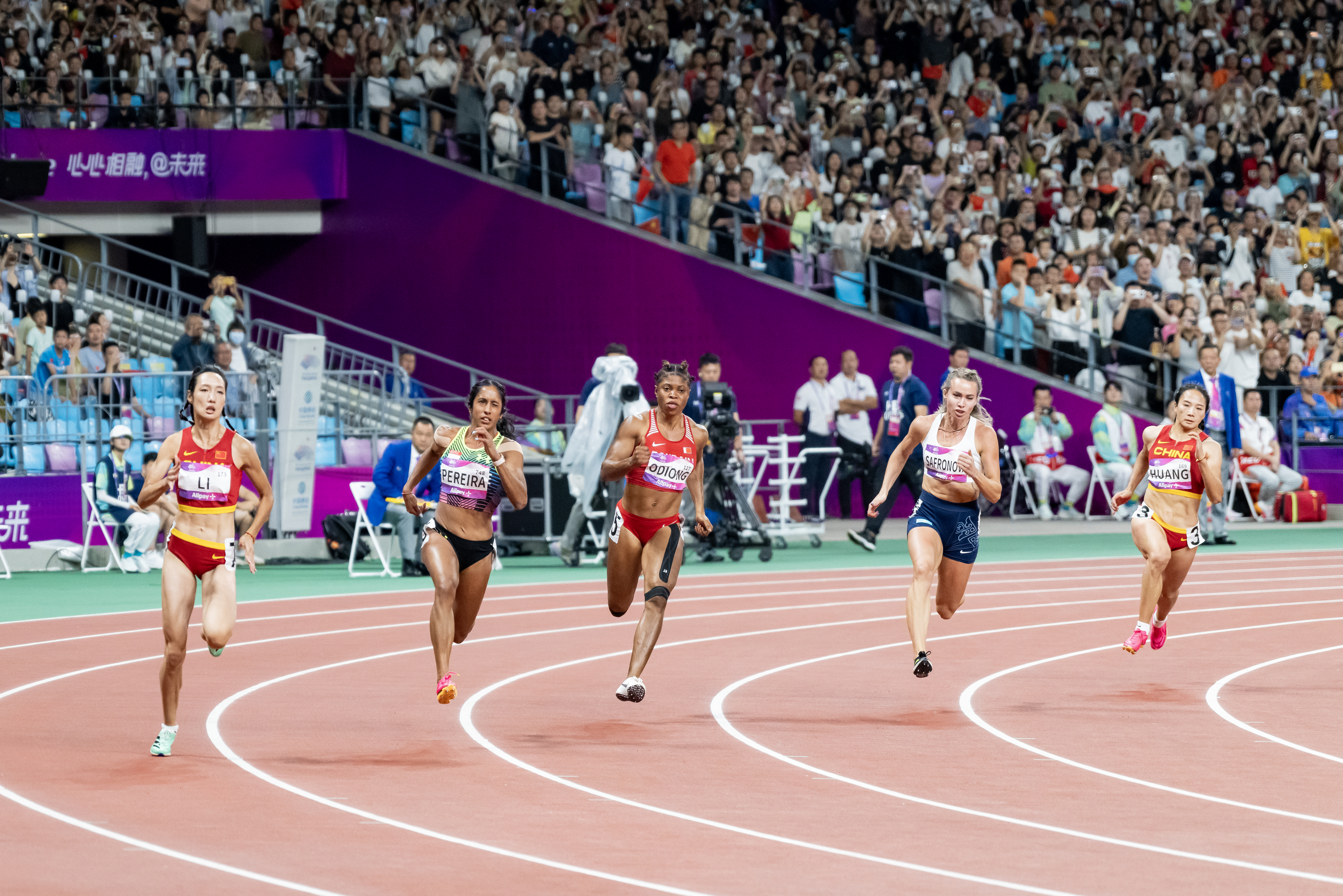
Pereira in the 200 m final of the 2022 Asian Games

Pereira competed in the 100 m, 200 m, and 4 × 100 m relay at the 2022 Asian Games in Hangzhou (delayed till 2023 due to the COVID-19 pandemic). On 29 September, she made the 100 m final after finishing 3rd in her heat with a time of 11.42s. She missed the two automatic qualifying spots but made the final by virtue of clocking the fastest time outside the six automatic qualifiers. In the final, she clinched silver with a time of 11.27s, being edged out by China's Ge Manqi by 0.04s; this was the first Asian Games track and field medal for Singapore in 49 years. The next day, Pereira qualified for the 200 m final with a time of 23.14s, the fastest in the heats. In the final, she won gold with a time of 23.03s, also ending Singapore's 49-year wait for a gold medal in track and field at the Asian Games since Chee Swee Lee's triumph in the women's 400 m back in 1974 Asian Games. In the final of the 4 x 100 m, Singapore finished 5th with a time of 45.34s.

=== Paris 2024 ===
As part of preparations for her 2024 season and for the Paris Olympics, Pereira was entered for a 400 m race at the Florida Relays on 30 March. Though she finished 5th, her 53.67-second effort eclipsed the 54.18sec mark set by Dipna Lim-Prasad that won her a silver medal at the 2017 SEA Games. With this record, Pereira held the national record in all four sprint categories.

On 15 April, Pereira suffered a stress injury in her fibula. This meant that she would miss her debut in the Diamond League competition in Xiamen and Shanghai, as well as two major meets in Japan. On 6 July 2024, Pereira was unveiled as one of the flag bearers for the Paris 2024 Olympics, alongside Team Singapore sailor Ryan Lo. On 12 July, it was announced that Pereira had qualified for the 100 m at the Paris 2024 Olympics by virtue of her world ranking. She had earlier already qualified for the 200 m by meeting the Olympic entry standard. At the Olympics, Pereira did not qualify for the 100 m semi-finals, and she finished 55th out of 72 athletes overall. Her time of 11.63s placed her 7th out of the nine runners in her heat.

In the 200 m, Pereira clocked 23.21s in Round 1, finishing last in Heat 5. With 6 slots up for grabs in the repechage, Pereira again placed last in Heat 1 with a timing of 23.45s, bowing out of the 2024 Paris Olympic games, finishing 31st out of 45 competitors.

=== 2025 ===
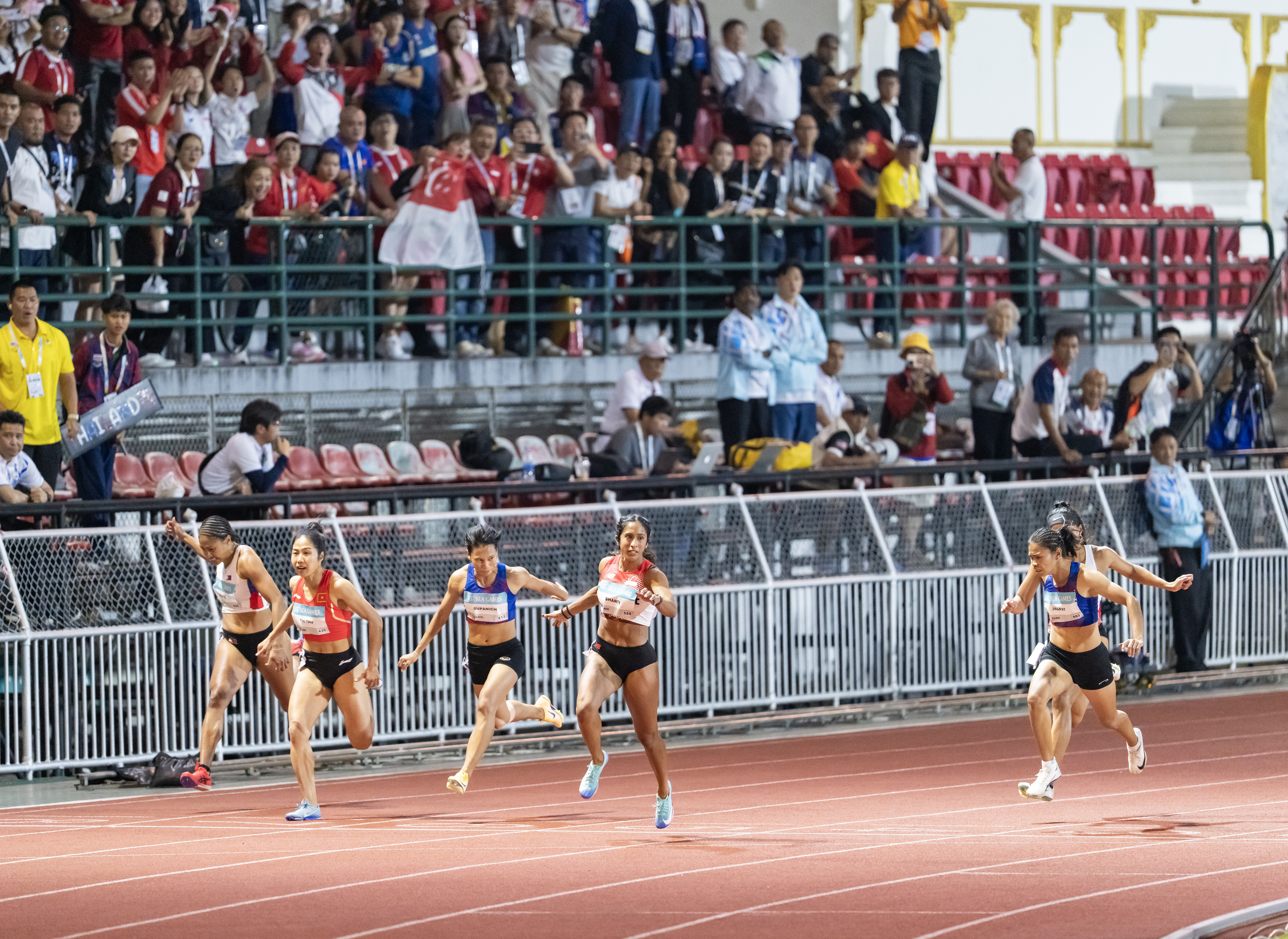
Pereira winning the 100 m gold at the 2025 Southeast Asian Games

At the 2025 Singapore Open Track and Field Championships, Pereira, alongside team mates, Laavinia Jaiganth, Elizabeth-Ann Tan, and Kerstin Ong, equaled the Singapore's women's 4 × 100 m relay national record and qualified for the Asian Athletics Championships. Pereira also won the 100 m and 200 m races with 11.45s and 23.11s respectively, setting a Championships record in the 200m.

At the 2025 Asian Athletics Championships, Pereira clinched the silver medal in the 100 m by clocking a time of 11.41s to finish behind China's Liang Xiaojing. She also clinched the silver medal in the 200 m by clocking a time of 22.98s to finish behind China's Chen Yujie. During the 2025 World Athletics Championships, Pereira missed out on a spot in the 200 m semi-finals after clocking 23.13s to finish fourth in her heat and 30th overall. She was the second-fastest Asian competitor.

In the 2025 Southeast Asian Games in Bangkok, Pereira successfully defended her crowns in the 100 m (11.36s) and 200 m (23.05s). She joined Vu Thi Huong as the only women to have achieved this at the regional games. In the 4 × 100 m relay, Pereira's team set a national record (44.41s).

=== 2026 Commonwealth Games ===
Pereira missed out on a place in the women’s 100 m final despite booking her place in the semi-finals after clocking a season’s best of 11.24sec, winning her heat. She finished fifth in her semi-final race and was 14th overall.

=== 20th Asian Games ===
Pereira made history on September 27, 2026 at the 2026 Asian Games in Aichi-Nagoya, Japan, by becoming the first woman in the entire history of the Asian Games to win back-to-back gold in the women's 200 m event, finishing with a season's best of 22.78s, 0.15s ahead of the silver medalist Chen Yujie.

Two days earlier, Pereira also successfully defended her silver medal in the women's 100 m final, clocking a season's best of 11.21s, just 0.01s off her national record from the 2023 Asian Athletics Championship. She finished 0.15s behind Chen Yujie, who won the 100 m event with a Games record of 11.06s.

Beyond her individual podium finishes, Pereira also teamed up with fellow Singaporean sprinters Amanda Loo, Elizabeth-Ann Tan and Kerstin Ong for the women's 4 × 100 m relay event, where they clocked a season's best of 45.12s to place fourth in Heat 1 and ninth out of ten overall.

== Personal life ==
Pereira has been engaged to former national sprinter and two-time SEA Games track and field bronze medalist, Tan Zong Yang, since 12 June 2024. Her older sisters, Valerie and Shobi Pereira, wrote about her life in Go Shanti Go!, a children's book.

== Recognition ==
- Straits Times’ Athlete of the Year: 2023
- Singapore Sports Awards: Sportswoman of the Year 2024

== Personal bests ==
- 60 metres (Indoor) – 7.61 s (Hangzhou 2014)
- 100 metres – 11.20 s (0.0 m/s, Bangkok 2023)
- 200 metres – 22.57 s (−0.4 m/s, Budapest 2023)
- 400 meters – 53.67 s (2024 Florida Relays)

Olympic Games
Preceded by Yu Mengyu; Loh Kean Yew	Flagbearer for Singapore; Paris 2024; With: Ryan Lo	Succeeded by Incumbent
