= Elizabeth-Ann Tan =

Singaporean sprinter

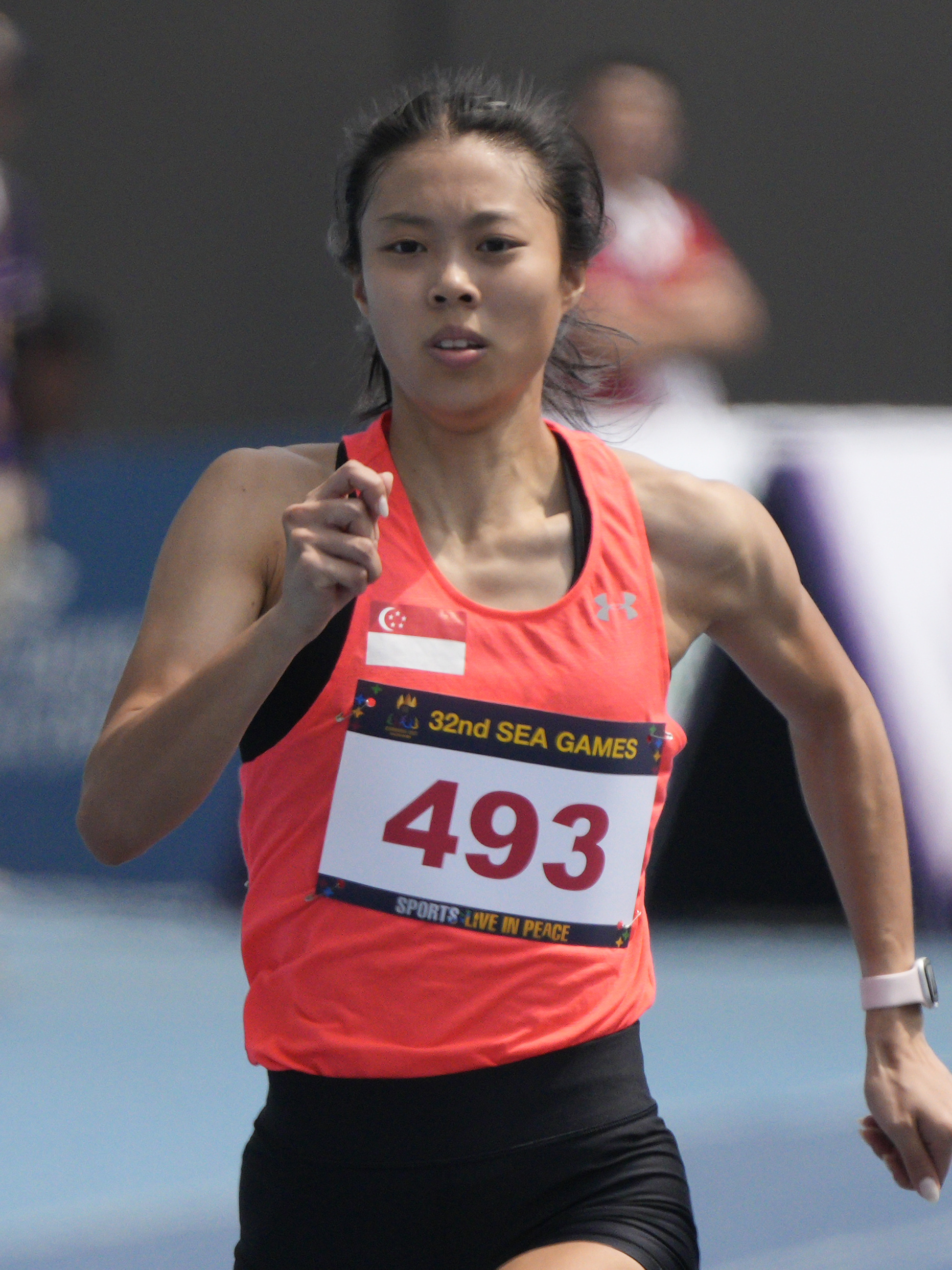
- Tan at the 2023 SEA Games

Personal information
- Born: 23 September 2003 (age 23) Singapore

Sport
- Country: Singapore
- Sport: Athletics
- Events: 100 metres, 200 metres, 4 x 100 metres relay

Elizabeth-Ann Tan Shee Ru (Chinese: 陈绪洳; pinyin: Chén Xùrù; born 23 September 2003) is a Singaporean athlete who specialises in the 100m, 200m, and 4 × 100 m relay.

Tan is the third Singaporean woman to run under 12 seconds for the 100m.

== Running career ==
As a schoolgirl at Nanyang Girls' High School and subsequently Hwa Chong Institution, Tan won 16 medals overall, 13 of them gold at the National School Games and set four records during her C Div and B Div years.

At the regional youth level, Tan was part of the quartet that won bronze for the 4 × 100 m at the 2017 ASEAN Schools Games. She was then part of the quartet that set the national junior record for 4 × 100 m with a time of 46.68s in 2019. She is also the ASEAN Schools Record Holder and National U18 Record Holder for the 100m Hurdles.

In the 2023 Southeast Asian Games held in Phnom Penh, Tan qualified for the 200m final, running a personal best of 24.03s in that race. In the 4 × 100 m, her team came in fourth with a time of 45.16s. In the same month, she ran a personal best of 11.87s in the 100m at the Taiwan Open. She lowered this to 11.81s at the 2023 Asian Athletics Championships. At the Asian Games, she clocked 12.00s.

Tan has been part of teams that broke the 4 × 100 m several times. At the 2025 Asian Athletics Championships, the quartet of Tan, Laavinia Jaiganth, Kerstin Ong, and Shanti Pereira clocked 44.66s; at the 2025 SEA Games, the same quartet ran 44.41s.
