= Mubassina Mohammed =

Indian long jumper (born 2006)

Personal information
- Born: 22 February 2006 (age 20) Minicoy, Lakshadweep, India

Sport
- Sport: Track and field
- Event: Long Jump
- Coached by: Anju Bobby George

Achievements and titles
- Personal best: 6.30 m (2025)
Medal record
Women's athletics
Representing India
South Asian Championships
Silver medal – second place	2025 Ranchi	Long jump
Asian U18 Championships
Silver medal – second place	2022 Kuwait	Long jump
Silver medal – second place	2022 Kuwait	Heptathlon

Mubassina Mohammed (born 22 February 2006) is an Indian long jumper. She is the first athlete from Lakshadweep to represent India in international track and field events.

== Early life ==
Mubassina Mohammed was born on 22 February 2006 in Minicoy, Lakshadweep, India. Her father, Mohammed, is a coconut plucker and a former long-distance runner who participated in local mini-marathon events on the island. Her mother, Dubina Bano, operates a tea stall along with her husband.

During her school years, Mubassina participated in 6 km races held locally for prize money. The island had limited sporting infrastructure, with only a 200-metre mud track that often became unusable during the monsoon season.

Her initial coaching was under Ahmed Jawad Hassan, who is based in Kavaratti, the capital of Lakshadweep. Due to transport constraints, her family temporarily relocated to Kavaratti for nearly two years to facilitate her training. She later moved to Kerala, where she trained at the National Centre of Excellence in Thiruvananthapuram for about one and a half years, before joining the Anju Bobby George Foundation.
