= Gurindervir Singh =

Indian sprinter (born 2000)

Personal information
- Born: 24 December 2000 (age 25) Patial, Punjab, India
- Height: 1.68 m (5 ft 6 in)
- Military career
- Branch: Indian Navy
- Service years: 2022–present
- Rank: Petty officer

Sport
- Sport: Athletics
- Events: 60 m, 100 m

Achievements and titles
- Personal bests: 60 m: 6.60 NR (2026); 100 m: 10.09 NR (2026)
Medal record
Men's athletics
Representing India
Asian Games
Bronze medal – third place	2026 Aichi–Nagoya	4 × 100 m mixed
South Asian Games
Silver medal – second place	2019 Kathmandu	4 × 100 m
Asian U20 Championships
Bronze medal – third place	2018 Gifu	4 × 100 m
Asian U18 Championships
Gold medal – first place	2017 Bangkok	100 m
Gold medal – first place	2017 Bangkok	Medley

Gurindervir Singh (born 24 December 2000) is an Indian sprinter. He is the current national record holder for the 60 m and 100 m. He is the first Indian sprinter to breach the 10.10 barrier in the 100 m, recording a time of 10.09 at the 2026 Federation Cup in Ranchi.

== Early life ==
Gurindervir Singh was born on 24 December 2000 in Patial village in Punjab's Jalandhar district, in a family with strong sporting influences. His father, Kamaljit Singh, a retired Assistant sub-inspector in Punjab Police and former national-level volleyball player, introduced him to athletics. His grandfather served in the Indian Army and was a kabaddi player. Singh took up sprinting at a young age after being inspired by Usain Bolt's performances at the 2008 Beijing Olympics. He joined the Indian Navy in 2022 through the sports quota and currently serves as a Petty officer.

== International competitions ==
Representing India
Year	Competition	Venue	Position	Event	Time
2017	Asian U18 Championships	Bangkok, Thailand	1st	100 m	10.77
2017	Asian U18 Championships	Bangkok, Thailand	1st	Medley	1:55.62
2017	World U18 Championships	Nairobi, Kenya	29th (heats)	100 m	11.07
2018	Asian U20 Championships	Gifu, Japan	17th (heats)	100 m	11.09
2018	Asian U20 Championships	Gifu, Japan	3rd	4 × 100 m	40.75
2019	Eurasian Athletics U20 Meeting	Almaty, Kazakhstan	1st	100 m	10.42
2019	World University Games	Naples, Italy	27th (heats)	100 m	10.54
2019	World University Games	Naples, Italy	12th (heats)	4 × 100 m	40.73
2019	South Asian Games	Kathmandu, Nepal	6th	100 m	10.81
2019	South Asian Games	Kathmandu, Nepal	2nd	4 × 100 m	39.97
2021	World University Games	Chengdu, China	DNF	4 × 100 m	—
2024	UAE Athletics Grand Prix	Dubai, United Arab Emirates	4th	100 m	10.55
2025	International Imam Reza Cup	Mashhad, Iran	2nd	100 m	10.56
2025	UAE Athletics Grand Prix	Dubai, United Arab Emirates	3rd	100 m	10.41
2025	Taiwan Athletics Open	Taipei, Taiwan	1st	4 × 100 m	38.75
2025	Dromia International Sprint Meeting	Vari, Greece	2nd	4 × 100 m	39.99
2025	Moore-Guldensporenmeeting	Kortrijk, Belgium	7th	100 m	10.57
2025	Spitzen Leichtathletik Luzern	Lucerne, Switzerland	4th	100 m	10.54
2025	PUMA Fast Arms Fast Legs	Wetzlar, Germany	6th	100 m	10.56
2025	World University Games	Bochum, Germany	34th (heats)	100 m	11.00
2026	World Relays	Gaborone, Botswana	DQ	4 × 100 m	—
2026	Saudi Athletics Grand Prix	Riyadh, Saudi Arabia	2nd	100 m	10.44
2026	Commonwealth Games	Glasgow, Scotland	28th (heats)	100 m	10.39
