= Seema Kumari (runner) =

Indian long-distance runner (born 2001)

Seema
Personal information
- Born: 10 January 2001 (age 25) Reta, Himachal Pradesh, India

Sport
- Sport: Athletics
- Event: Long-distance running

Achievements and titles
- Personal bests: 5000 m: 15:16.20 (2026); 10,000 m: 32:02.43 (2026)
Medal record
Women's athletics
Representing India
Asian Games
Bronze medal – third place	2026 Aichi–Nagoya	10,000 m
Asian Cross Country Championships
Gold medal – first place	2024 Hong Kong	10,000 m
South Asian Championships
Silver medal – second place	2025 Ranchi	5000 m
World University Games
Silver medal – second place	2025 Rhine–Ruhr	5000 m
Asian Youth Championships
Bronze medal – third place	2017 Bangkok	3000 m

Seema Kumari (born 10 January 2001) is an Indian long-distance runner. She won the bronze medal at the 2026 Asian Games, silver medals at the 2025 South Asian Championships and 2025 World University Games, and gold medal at the 2024 Asian Cross Country Championships.

== Career ==
Seema gained her first international experience in 2017 when she won the bronze medal in the 3000 m race at the Asian U18 Championships in Bangkok in 10:05.27. She then took ninth place at the Commonwealth Youth Games in Nassau in 10:09.34. The following year, she took fifth place at the Asian Junior Championships in Gifu in 10:12.33, before finishing 13th at the Youth Olympic Games in Buenos Aires.

At the 2024 World Cross Country Championships in Belgrade, she finished 34th in the individual race with a time of 34:35. In October 2024, she won the Asian Cross Country Championships in Hong Kong in 37:20.

In 2025, Seema took sixth place in the 10,000 m race at the Asian Championships in Gumi in 33:08.23. Later that season, Seema clinched silver in the 5000 m event with a season-best time of 15:35.86 at the 2025 World University Games. She was also the top Indian finisher in the Indian women's elite race in the 2025 Delhi Half Marathon.

In 2026, Kumari won the bronze medal in the women's 10,000 metres at the 2026 Asian Games in Aichi–Nagoya, Japan, recording a time of 32:50.05.
