= Nandhini Kongan =

Indian athlete (born 1999)

Personal information
- Born: 13 July 1999 (age 27) Tamil Nadu, India

Sport
- Sport: Athletics
Medal record
Women's athletics
Representing India
South Asian Championships
Gold medal – first place	2025 Ranchi	100 m hurdles

Nandhini Kongan (born 13 July 1999) is an Indian athlete who specialises in the 100 m hurdles. She qualified for the finals of the 100m hurdles at the 2026 Asian Games in Japan.

Nandhini is from Tamil Nadu. She studied at the Telangana Social Welfare Residential Educational Institutions Society.

== Career ==
On 27 September 2026, she finished fourth in her heat clocking 13.48 seconds and qualified for the finals of the Asian Games. In June 2026, she clocked her personal best of 13.22 seconds at the 65th National Inter State Senior Athletics Championships at Kalinga Stadium, Bhubaneshwar, Odisha. She won a silver behind Jyothi Yarraji and also bettered the Asian Games qualification mark of 13.34 seconds.

In May 2026, she clocked 13.24 seconds to win the gold beating SAAF champion, Pragyan Prashanti Sahu, at the Federation Cup in Ranchi. In October 2025, she won a gold medal in the 100m hurdles at the South Asian Athletics Championships clocking 13.56 seconds.

In August 2022, she broke the National record in 100m hurdles at the under 20 World Athletics Championships in Cali, Columbia. Earlier, she entered the finals of the U20 Junior World Athletics Championship.
