= 2022 Asian U18 Athletics Championships =

4th Asian U18 Athletics Championships
- Dates: 13–16 October 2022
- Host city: Kuwait City
- Venue: Ahmed Al Rashdan Track & Field Stadium
- Level: U18 (Youth)
- Events: 40 (39)

The 2022 Asian U18 Athletics Championships was the fourth edition of the biennial, continental athletics competition for Asian athletes aged 15 to 17. It was held at the Ahmed Al Rashdan Track & Field Stadium in Kuwait City from 13 to 16 October 2022.

== History of Asian Youth Athletics Championship ==
The Asian Youth Athletics Championships (U18) (Asian Youth U18 Athletics Championships) is a biennial, continental athletics competition for Asian athletes, organised by the Asian Athletics Association. First held in 2015, it is a youth category event open to athletes aged fifteen and seventeen. The competition was the fourth continental athletics competition to be held for that age level, following in the steps of the South American, Oceanian and African events. Its first edition came at a time of rising interest in such competitions, with the first African championships being held in 2013, and the European Athletics Youth Championships scheduled for the following year. In March 2014, the Asian Athletics Association's president Dahlan Jumaan al-Hamad cited the creation of the championships as a way of boosting the grassroots-level development of the sport in Asia and raising the importance of continental-level competition among the region's countries.

The logo for the 2022 championships features Kuwaiti middle-distance runner Khaled Khalifa Al-Shammari.

== Medal summary ==
=== Men ===
Event	Gold		Silver		Bronze	
100 metres (20 participants) (wind: -0.4 m/s)	Puripol Boonson; Thailand	10.33 CR	Lee Po-jui; Chinese Taipei	10.73	Nwamadi Joel-jin; South Korea	10.77
200 metres (20) (wind: -0.7 m/s)	Puripol Boonson; Thailand	21.53	Yaqoub Al-Azemi; Kuwait	21.55	Pengiran Aidil Auf Bin Hajam; Malaysia	21.65
400 metres (15)	Seyed Mohammad Sajjad Aghaei; Iran	48.37	Jayathilake Praveen Salamuthu; Sri Lanka	48.56	Rajapaksha Pathiranage Don Avishka Theminda Rajapa; Sri Lanka	48.70
800 metres (11)	Mohamadhesam Mozafari; Iran	1:53.30	Chu Lok Yin; Hong Kong	1:53.46	Abdulaziz Khafif; Kuwait	1:54.55
1500 metres (8)	Amit Chaudhry; India	4:04.59	Sulaiman Assi; Syria	4:06.36	Aibol Omar; Kazakhstan	4:07.99
3000 metres (7)	Abdikani Hamid; Bahrain	8:35.76	Hamad Saleh Al-Yami; Saudi Arabia	8:59.01	Zainulabdeen Mokhles Al-Shamkhee; Iraq	9:01.50
110 metres hurdles (9)	Hsieh Yuan-kai; Chinese Taipei	13.65	Muhammad Fiross Bin Mohd Faizal; Malaysia	13.78	Brian Bagas Swara; Indonesia	13.90
400 metres hurdles (12)	Lin Yan-kai; Chinese Taipei	52.23	Mahamat Abakar Abdrahman; Qatar	52.47	Murad Sirman; India	53.34
2000 metres steeplechase (7)	Mustafa Mohsin Al-Khazaali; Iraq	5:59.48	Rinat Kulygin; Kazakhstan	6:04.63	Reza Mostafa Nejad; Iran	6:08.77
Medley relay (7)	India (IND)	1:55.20	Thailand (THA)	1:55.82	Hong Kong (HKG)	1:56.82
10000 m walk (0)	Not awarded	-	Not awarded	-	Not awarded	-
High jump (10)	Choi Jin-woo; South Korea	2.21 m	Edirisingha Siriwardanalage Deneth Anuhas; Sri Lanka	2.01 m	Gammanage Lesandu Arthavidu; Sri Lanka	1.97 m
Pole vault (9)	Seifeldin Mohamed Abdelsalam; Qatar	5.10 m	Amirarshia Mosadeghi Dogaheh; Iran	5.00 m	Kuldeep Kumar; India	4.80 m
Long jump (11)	Abdullah Al-Azemi; Kuwait	7.34 m	Siraphob Bunyuak; Thailand	7.11 m	Yiu Pak Yu; Hong Kong	7.00 m
Triple jump (6)	Ng Tak Sing; Malaysia	14.62 m	Farid Gharanjik; Iran	14.35 m	Sami Mousa Bakheet; Saudi Arabia	14.26 m
Shot put (8)	Akash Yadav; India	19.37 m	Djibrine Adoum Ahmat; Qatar	19.01 m	Siddharth Choudhary; India	19.00 m
Discus throw (8)	Atul; India	56.23 m	Servan K. C. India	55.91 m	Djibrine Adoum Ahmat; Qatar	53.75 m
Hammer throw (6)	Mahdi Haft Cheshmeh; Iran	68.30 m	Mohd Aman; India	67.03 m	Ali Al-Hendal; Kuwait	64.90 m
Javelin throw (7)	Huang Chao-hong; Chinese Taipei	80.40 m	Arjun; India	70.98 m	Himanshu Mishra; India	67.67 m
Decathlon (8)	Nodir Norbaev; Uzbekistan	6934 pts	Sina Afshinfar; Iran	6417 pts	Sajjad Ahmed Al-Alkhazali; Saudi Arabia	5674 pts

=== Women ===
Event	Gold		Silver		Bronze	
100 metres (14) (wind: -0.2 m/s)	Valentin Vanesa Lonteng; Indonesia	11.69	Athicha Phetkun; Thailand	12.01	Li Tsz To; Hong Kong	12.15
200 metres (11) (wind: -1.7 m/s)	Valentin Vanesa Lonteng; Indonesia	24.06	Athicha Phetkun; Thailand	24.48	Li Tsz To; Hong Kong	24.79
400 metres (7)	Hoang Thi Anh Thuc; Vietnam	55.03	Isha Rajesh Jadhav; India	56.16	Anushka Dattatray Kumbah; India	57.36
800 metres (5)	Ashakiran Barla; India	2:06.79	Wickramasinghe Mudiyanselage Kasuni Nirmali Wickra; Sri Lanka	2:15.42	Mutiara Oktarani Nurul Al Pasha; Indonesia Narjis Hussein Suwaed; Iraq	2:15.73 2:33.34
1500 metres (2)	Nguyen Khanh Linh; Vietnam	4:51.61	Piyapat Pongsapan; Thailand	4:58.82	Not awarded	–
3000 metres (2)	Arina Gladysheva; Kazakhstan	10:09.76	Sunita Devi; India	10:34.07	Not awarded	–
100 metres hurdles (8)	Pak Hoi Man Chloe; Hong Kong	14.02	Sabita Toppo; India	14.17	Lai Irene-li; Chinese Taipei	14.24
400 metres hurdles (6)	Nazaninftemeh Eidiyankakhaki; Iran	1:01.03	Anastassiya Koloda; Kazakhstan	1:01.52	Yi Bo-an; Chinese Taipei	1:02.40
2000 metres steeplechase (5)	Dilshoda Usmanova; Uzbekistan	6:55.41	Ekta Pradeep Dey; India	7:15.53	Setayesh Aminiyazdi; Iran	7:16.69
Medley relay (5)	India (IND)	2:12.18	Thailand (THA)	2:14.38	Hong Kong (HKG)	2:17.97
5000 m walk (2)	Sabrina Arziyeva; Kazakhstan	27:35.44	Maryam Al-Qaimary; Jordan	34:40.10	Not awarded	–
High jump (9)	Sayfullaeva Barnokhon; Uzbekistan	1.84 m	Alina Chistyakova; Kazakhstan	1.73 m	Bui Thi Kim Anh; Vietnam	1.73 m
Pole vault (6)	Maria Andriani Melabessy; Indonesia	3.90 m	Vanshika Ghanghas; India	3.70 m	Jasmina Mansurova; Uzbekistan	3.60 m
Long jump (13)	Sharifa Davronova; Uzbekistan	6.06 m	Mubassina Mohammed; India	5.91 m	Jia Wai Yin; Hong Kong	5.81 m
Triple jump (9)	Sharifa Davronova; Uzbekistan	13.23 m	Khushnoza Shavkatova; Uzbekistan	12.23 m	Divyasri; India	12.15 m
Shot put (5)	Chiang Ching-yuan; Chinese Taipei	17.82 m	Park So-jin; South Korea	16.89 m	Elaheh Alizadeh; Iran	14.92 m
Discus throw (5)	Chiang Ching-yuan; Chinese Taipei	45.42 m	Im Chae-yeon; South Korea	44.21 m	Nikita Kumari; India	44.14 m
Hammer throw (5)	Kim Tae-hui; South Korea	59.24 m	Melika Norouzi; Iran	57.85 m	Mahdis Minaei Pour; Iran	54.02 m
Javelin throw (7)	Chu Pin-hsun; Chinese Taipei	52.70 m	Deepika; India	50.15 m	Yang Seok-ju; South Korea	48.61 m
Heptathlon (5)	Alina Chistyakova; Kazakhstan	4737 pts	Mubassina Mohammed; India	4730 pts	Elnaz Mousaei; Iran	4501 pts

== Nations ==
Kuwait was hosting around 400 athletes from 33 Asian Countries. Athletes competed in 40 athletics sports, 20 for boys and 20 for girls.

1. Saudi Arabia
2. Qatar
3. Bahrain
4. Oman
5. Syria
6. Lebanon
7. Jordan
8. Palestine
9. Yemen
10. Iraq
11. Iran (25)
12. Bangladesh
13. Pakistan
14. Brunei
15. Chinese Taipei
16. Hong Kong
17. India (35)
18. Indonesia
19. Kazakhstan
20. South Korea
21. Kyrgyzstan
22. Laos
23. Thailand
24. Malaysia
25. Nepal
26. Maldives
27. Philippines
28. Singapore
29. Tajikistan
30. Vietnam
31. Uzbekistan
32. Kuwait
33. Sri Lanka (11)

== Medal table ==
Following a decision by the judges, the bronze medal was awarded to two athletes in 800m Girls.

* Host nation (Kuwait)

Rank	Nation	Gold	Silver	Bronze	Total
1	India (IND)	6	11	7	24
2	Chinese Taipei (TPE)	6	1	2	9
3	Uzbekistan (UZB)	5	1	1	7
4	Iran (IRI)	4	4	5	13
5	Kazakhstan (KAZ)	3	3	1	7
6	Indonesia (INA)	3	0	2	5
7	Thailand (THA)	2	6	0	8
8	South Korea (KOR)	2	2	2	6
9	Vietnam (VIE)	2	0	1	3
10	Qatar (QAT)	1	2	1	4
11	Hong Kong (HKG)	1	1	6	8
12	Kuwait (KUW)	1	1	2	4
13	Malaysia (MAS)	1	1	1	3
14	Iraq (IRQ)	1	0	2	3
15	Bahrain (BHR)	1	0	0	1
16	Sri Lanka (SRI)	0	3	2	5
17	Saudi Arabia (KSA)	0	1	2	3
18	Jordan (JOR)	0	1	0	1
18	Syria (SYR)	0	1	0	1
Totals (19 entries)		39	39	37	115

Preceded by 2019; Hong Kong	4th Asian Youth Athletics Championships; 2022; Kuwait	Succeeded by 2023; Uzbekistan
