= 2015 World Youth Championships in Athletics – Girls' javelin throw =

Girls' javelin throw at the 2015 World Youth Championships in Athletics
- Venue: Estadio Olímpico Pascual Guerrero
- Dates: 15–16 July
- Competitors: 30 from 23 nations
- Winning distance: 60.35

Medalists
gold medal	Haruka Kitaguchi	Japan
silver medal	Stella Weinberg	Norway
bronze medal	Laine Donāne	Latvia

The girls' javelin throw at the 2015 World Youth Championships in Athletics was held at the Estadio Olímpico Pascual Guerrero in Cali, Colombia from 15 to 16 July 2015.

== Records ==
Prior to the competition, the following records were as follows.

World Youth Best	Xue Juan (CHN)	62.93	Changsha, China	27 October 2003
Championship Record	Mackenzie Little (AUS)	61.47	Donetsk, Ukraine	11 July 2013
World Youth Leading	Yu Yuzhen (CHN)	61.97	Doha, Qatar	8 May 2015

== Results ==
=== Qualification ===
With qualifying standard of 52.00 (Q) or at least the 12 best performers (q) advance to the final.

Rank	Group	Name	Nationality	1	2	3	Mark	Notes
1	B	Nikol Tabačková	Czech Republic	50.69	55.29		55.29	Q
2	A	Lotte Reimann	Germany	54.35			54.35	Q, PB
3	A	Stella Weinberg	Norway	53.46			53.46	Q
4	B	Laine Donāne	Latvia	x	52.71		52.71	Q
5	B	Chen Jiajia	China	46.36	52.34		52.34	Q
6	A	Sophia Rivera	United States	49.26	47.72	52.21	52.21	Q, PB
7	A	Haruka Kitaguchi	Japan	51.27	52.15		52.15	Q, PB
8	B	Katelyn Gochenour	United States	51.76	48.70	x	51.76	q, PB
9	A	Yu Yuzhen	China	51.61	x	46.03	51.61	q
10	B	Anneke Germishuys	South Africa	49.65	x	45.87	49.65	q
11	A	Maritza Escárcega	Mexico	48.05	46.04	49.05	49.05	q, PB
12	B	Emma Hamplett	Great Britain	48.58	x	x	48.58	q
13	A	Afrodíti Manioú	Greece	x	44.38	48.52	48.52	
14	B	Géraldine Ruckstuhl	Switzerland	x	x	48.13	48.13	
15	B	Tsugumi Okabayashi	Japan	47.64	46.51	42.33	47.64	PB
16	B	Araceli Llanes	Paraguay	45.60	x	46.90	46.90	
17	B	Salma Mohsen Taha	Egypt	46.89	44.35	45.29	46.89	
18	A	Carolin Näslund	Sweden	x	x	46.88	46.88	
19	A	Valeriya Kuchina	Russia	x	x	46.83	46.83	
20	A	Oleksandra Zarytska	Ukraine	x	46.10	42.43	46.10	
21	B	Francesca Iacuzzo	Italy	x	45.46	40.63	45.46	
22	B	Franja Želimorski	Croatia	x	34.55	45.26	45.26	
23	A	Sara Zabarino	Italy	44.00	45.19	x	45.19	
24	B	Gabriela Soler	Venezuela	x	45.17	43.46	45.17	
25	B	Maja Gustavsson	Sweden	44.72	44.78	43.10	44.78	
26	A	Marcella Liiv	Estonia	43.48	42.26	41.35	43.48	
27	B	Eleni Geli	Greece	x	43.18	41.55	43.18	
28	A	Claudia Lapuerta	Spain	40.00	41.68	x	41.68	
29	A	Guisett Ortiz	Colombia	37.90	x	34.78	37.90	PB
–	A	Carli Nieuwenhuizen	South Africa	x	x	x	NM	

=== Final ===
Rank	Name	Nationality	1	2	3	4	5	6	Mark	Notes
1st place, gold medalist(s)	Haruka Kitaguchi	Japan	56.42	51.92	x	52.93	60.35	56.42	60.35	PB
2nd place, silver medalist(s)	Stella Weinberg	Norway	x	51.99	57.11	x	r		57.11	PB
3rd place, bronze medalist(s)	Laine Donāne	Latvia	56.15	x	51.71	x	55.41	56.10	56.15	
4	Nikol Tabačková	Czech Republic	53.86	49.54	52.29	50.46	55.97	54.39	55.97	
5	Chen Jiajia	China	46.44	53.95	52.85	x	x	53.08	53.95	
6	Anneke Germishuys	South Africa	50.04	53.10	x	44.84	49.00	x	53.10	PB
7	Yu Yuzhen	China	49.79	x	49.90	51.42	51.51	50.66	51.51	
8	Sophia Rivera	United States	x	48.11	50.85	48.18	–	–	50.85	
9	Emma Hamplett	Great Britain	47.56	x	41.88				47.56	
10	Maritza Escárcega	Mexico	46.52	x	x				46.52	
11	Lotte Reimann	Germany	45.63	29.60	46.11				46.11	
12	Katelyn Gochenour	United States	x	x	45.88				45.88	
