= Roksana Khudoyarova =

Uzbekistani triple jumper (born 2001)

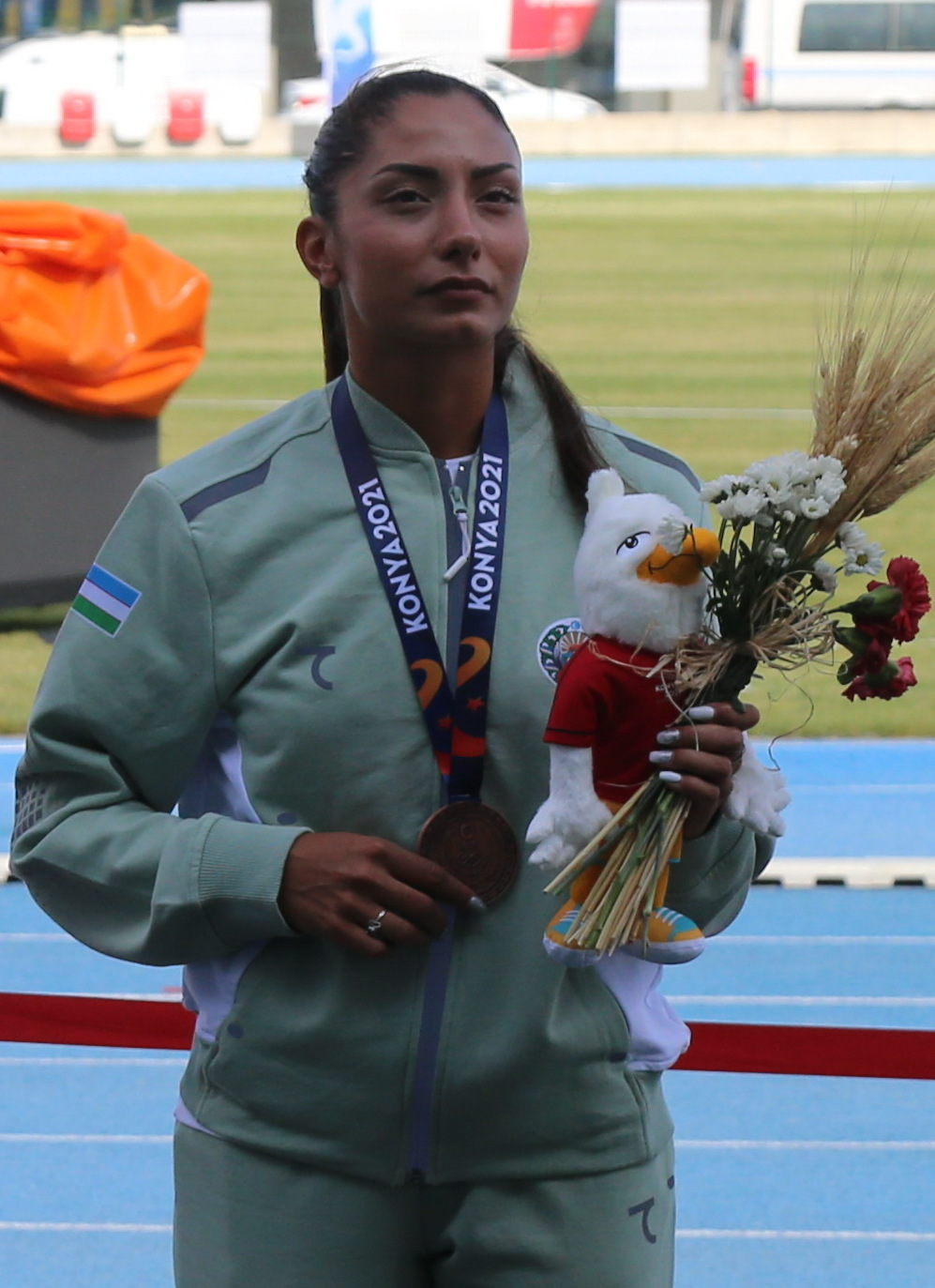
- Khudoyarova at Konya 2021

Personal information
- Nationality: Uzbekistani
- Born: 30 January 2001 (age 25)

Sport
- Sport: Athletics
- Event: Triple jump
Medal record
Men's athletics
Representing Uzbekistan
Islamic Solidarity Games
Bronze medal – third place	2021 Konya	Long jump
Asian Youth Championships
Silver medal – second place	2017 Bangkok	heptathlon

Roksana Khudoyarova (born 30 January 2001) is an Uzbekistani athlete. She competed in the women's triple jump at the 2020 Summer Olympics.

== Career ==
In 2017 in Bangkok (Thailand) in athletics, she won a silver medal in the heptathlon.

At the 2018 Asian Indoor Athletics Championships held in Tehran, Iran, she was only fifth with a height of 5.73 m, and seventh in the triple jump with a height of 12.69 m. In the same year, at the licensed Asian track and field tournament in Bangkok, Thailand, she won the gold medal and Olympic qualification for the Summer Junior Olympic Games with a result of 13.21 m in the triple jump. However, at the Summer Youth Olympic Games in Buenos Aires, Argentina, she finished fourth in the triple jump with 12.94 m.

In 2019, she participated in the Asian Athletics Championship held in Doha (Qatar). However, she did not succeed: she took only sixth place in the long jump with a result of 6.08 m, and tenth place in the triple jump with a result of 12.63 m.

In June 2021, in Bishkek (Kyrgyzstan), in a tournament for trophies of Olympic champion Tatyana Kolpakova, she won the gold medal with a result of 14.36 m in the triple jump. On June 26, 2021, at the Kazakhstan Cup held in Almaty, she was third in the triple jump with a result of 13.92 m. On June 29, 2021, at the Cup of Uzbekistan held in Tashkent, she won the gold medal with a result of 14.38 m in the triple jump.

In 2021, she won a license for the XXXII Summer Olympics in Tokyo, Japan, and competed in the triple jump. However, she was unsuccessful in qualifying, finishing only fourteenth with a jump of 13.02 m and did not advance.
