= Sumeda Ranasinghe =

Sri Lankan javelin thrower

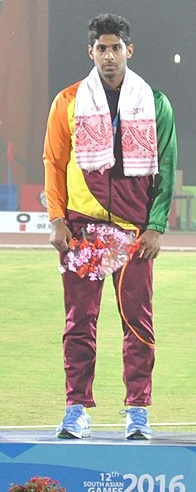
- Ranasinghe at the 2016 South Asian Games

Personal information
- Full name: R.M. Sumeda Jagath Ranasinghe
- Born: 10 February 1991 (age 35) Kegalle, Sri Lanka
- Education: University of Sri Jayewardenepura; Kegalu Vidyalaya

Sport
- Sport: Track and field
- Event: Javelin throw

Achievements and titles
- Personal best: 85.78 m (2025)
Medal record
Men's athletics
Representing Sri Lanka
Asian Throwing Championships
| Bronze medal – third place | 2024 Mokpo | Javelin throw |
South Asian Games
| Silver medal – second place | 2016 Guwahati | Javelin throw |
| Bronze medal – third place | 2019 Kathmandu | Javelin throw |
South Asian Championships
| Silver medal – second place | 2025 Ranchi | Javelin throw |
Military World Games
| Bronze medal – third place | 2019 Wuhan | Javelin throw |

R.M. Sumeda Jagath Ranasinghe (born 10 February 1991) is a Sri Lankan javelin thrower. Ranasinghe represented Sri Lanka in the men's javelin event at the 2016 Rio Olympics.
