= 2015 Asian Youth Athletics Championships =

1st Asian Youth Athletics Championships
- Dates: 8–11 May 2015
- Host city: Doha, Qatar
- Venue: Suheim Bin Hamad Stadium
- Level: Youth
- Events: 40

The 2015 Asian Youth Athletics Championships was the first edition of the biennial, continental athletics competition for Asian athletes aged fifteen to seventeen. It was held in Doha, Qatar from 8–11 May. A total of forty events were contested, with the events divided evenly between the sexes. The event programme mirrored that of the previous IAAF World Youth Championships in Athletics, with the exception of a boy's decathlon, rather than the octathlon.

The event was established following the 78th council meeting of the Asian Athletics Association in March 2014. The body's president Dahlan Jumaan al-Hamad cited the creation of the championships as a way of boosting the grassroots-level development of the sport in Asia and raise the importance of continental level competition among the region's countries.

China easily topped the medal table with half of their 32 medals being gold. Chinese Taipei won the next most gold medals, with four, while India had the second largest overall medal haul at fourteen medals. Kazakhstan (three golds, eight medals) and Japan (nine medals) were the other leading nations of the tournament. A total of 27 of the participating nations reached the medal table.

The highest level performance at the competition came from Chinese girls' javelin thrower Yu Yuzhen, whose winning throw of 61.97 m (203 ft 3 3/4 in) was the world youth best for the 500-gramme youth implement. Yu Shu Shen of Chinese Taipei was the only athlete to win two individual titles, doing so in the boys' 100 metres and 200 metres.

An anti-doping outreach and sports ethics programme was held in conjunction with the competition, with the achievements of Liu Xiang and Koji Murofushi being held up as examples of Olympic champions from Asia who promoted an anti-doping culture.

== Medal summary ==
=== Men ===
Event	Gold		Silver		Bronze	
100 metres	Shen Yu-sen (TPE)	10.48	Tang Yao (CHN)	10.60	Burhan Wardhani (INA)	10.81
200 metres	Shen Yu-sen (TPE)	21.69	Wu Zhitao (CHN)	22.01	Ogsa Agfreansa (INA)	22.16
400 metres	Wu Yu Ang (CHN)	47.55	Nattapong Kongkraphan (THA)	48.02	Russel Alexander Nasir Taib (MAS)	49.07
800 metres	Beant Singh (IND)	1:52.26	Mohaamed Raheem Zghair Al-Bzaznah (IRQ)	1:54.92	Saeed Hassan Olwani (KSA)	1:55.84
1500 metres	Huang Peng (CHN)	4:05.85	Lee Kyeong-ho (KOR)	4:07.08	Hikaru Oya (JPN)	4:07.27
3000 metres	Tadwi Kishan Narshi (IND)	8:26.24	Chihiro Ono (JPN)	8:37.29	Yaser Salim Ba Gharb (YEM)	8:37.65
110 metres hurdles	Fares Khaled Alsaid (KUW)	13.92	Bo Xiaoshuai (CHN)	14.02	Irwan Suadi (INA)	14.36
400 metres hurdles	Witthawat Thumcha (THA)	52.45	Darshana Kuamrabatagallalage (SRI)	52.88	Kim Hyun-bin (KOR)	52.93
2000 metres steeplechase	Muhand Khamis Saifeldin (QAT)	5:54.34	Luo Chun (CHN)	5:56.99	Duc Le Trung (VIE)	6:00.59
Medley relay	China (CHN); Tang Yao; Wu Zhitao; Zeng Sen; Wu Yu Ang	1:53.34	India (IND); Nuzrat; Beant Singh; Chirag; Chandan Bauri	1:53.74	Saudi Arabia (KSA); Abdulelah Ahmed Al Nashri; Saad Ahmed Sabbai; Ahmed Saleh Mahda; Saeed Hassan Olwani	1:55.81
10,000 m walk	Zhang Jun (CHN)	44:00.87	Shuqi Guo (CHN)	45:25.93	Song Yun-hwa (KOR)	48:34.39
High jump	Ding Shuo (CHN)	2.15 m	Roshan Dammika Ranatungage (SRI)	2.12 m	Hussein Falah Hasan Al-Ibraheemi (IRQ)	2.12 m
Pole vault	Yeh Yao-Wen (TPE)	4.90 m	Muntadher Falih Abdulwahid (IRQ)	4.65 m	Teuku Tegar Abadi (INA)	4.50 m
Long jump	Kim Young-bin (KOR)	7.49 m	Yugo Sakai (JPN)	7.31 m	Jose Jerry Belibestre (PHI)	7.26 m
Triple jump	Muhammed Afzal (PAK)	15.44 m	Chamal Kumarasiri Liyana Waduge (SRI)	15.39 m	Sonu Kumar (IND)	15.08 m
Shot put	Ma Hao-Wei (TPE)	19.43 m	Ashish Bhalothia (IND)	17.76 m	Hiroshi Ikegawa (JPN)	17.51 m
Discus throw	Sajjad Hassen Zare (IRI)	53.06 m	Eric Yee (SIN)	52.55 m	Du Haonan (CHN)	48.99 m
Hammer throw	Xu Wenji (CHN)	75.15 m	Ashish Jakhar (IND)	71.79 m	Miraj Ali (IND)	64.91 m
Javelin throw	Vladyslav Palyunin (UZB)	79.11 m	Mohd Hadish (IND)	75.52 m	Abhishek Drall (IND)	74.72 m
Decathlon	Mohamed Alferas (KUW)	6671 pts	Rajesh R (IND)	5867 pts	Ahmed Yaseen Alyaseen (KSA)	5703 pts

=== Women ===
Event	Gold		Silver		Bronze	
100 metres	Poon Hang Wai (HKG)	12.27	Lea Paul Obeid (LIB)	12.32	Hu Siyu (CHN)	12.32
200 metres	Huang Jiaxin (CHN)	24.67	Sayaka Morita (JPN)	25.16	Kugapriya Chandran (SIN)	25.35
400 metres	Salwa Eid Naser (BHR)	53.02	Jisna Mathew (IND)	53.84	Shereen Samson Vallabouy (MAS)	55.14
800 metres	Arina Kleshchukov (KGZ)	2:14.73	Misato Kaneko (JPN)	2:15.04	Sara Joe Rafik Kortbawi (LIB)	2:19.64
1500 metres	Dalila Abdulkadir Gosa (BHR)	4:19.95	Nozomi Tanaka (JPN)	4:25.00	Dawajila (CHN)	4:37.64
3000 metres	Fatuma Jewaro Chebsi (BHR)	9:30.17	Xia Yuyu (CHN)	9:53.03	Anumol Thampi (IND)	10:24.98
100 metres hurdles	Deng Xuelin (CHN)	13.62	Lam Yan Tung (HKG)	14.22	Lin Hsiao-Hui (TPE)	14.24
400 metres hurdles	Yamani Dulanjalee Mudiyanselage (SRI)	61.27	Qui Zhangyen (CHN)	62.61	Adelina Akhmetova (KAZ)	63.27
2000 metres steeplechase	Tian Wanhua (CHN)	7:01.06	Choe Kang Bok (PRK)	7:14.88	Lada Fomina (KAZ)	7:16.08
Medley relay	China (CHN); Hu Siyu heng Gange; Huang Jiaxin; Liang Nuo	2:13.32	Kazakhstan (KAZ); Kamila Niyazova; Adelina Akhmetova; Mariya Ovchinnikova; Anastassiya Ksyanova	2:17.72	Bahrain (BHR); Shaika Mohamed Rabeaa; Salwa Eid Naser Naser; Dalila Abdulkadir Gosa; Fatuma Jewaro Chebsi	2:19.04
5000 m walk	Ma Zhenxia (CHN)	23:45.19	Qiji Zhouma (CHN)	24:05.84	Kana Kimura (JPN)	24:59.04
High jump	Safina Sadullaeva (UZB)	1.74 m	Wong Yuen Nam (HKG)	1.71 m	Nadezhda Dubovitskaya (KAZ)	1.68 m
Pole vault	Anna Danilovskaya (KAZ)	3.70 m	Devi Ayu Febriana (INA)	3.40 m	Fatima Othman Al Absi (QAT)	2.00 m
Long jump	Kanae Sugimora (JPN)	5.90 m	Lee Hui-jin (KOR)	5.82 m	Zeng Rui (CHN)	5.81 m
Triple jump	Mariya Ovchinnikova (KAZ)	12.81 m	Chen Jie (CHN)	12.77 m	Viktoriya Dirdina (UZB)	12.34 m
Shot put	Liu Ziyue (CHN)	16.08 m	Lee Yu-ri (KOR)	16.00 m	Liu Xiuerui (CHN)	15.36 m
Discus throw	Dong Xiaocen (CHN)	45.58 m	Fatima Al Hosani (UAE)	41.80 m	Seema (IND)	41.14 m
Hammer throw	Shang Ningyu (CHN)	66.59 m	Yao Kailun (CHN)	60.16 m	Amineh Kashiri (IRI)	48.25 m
Javelin throw	Yu Yuzhen (CHN)	61.97 m WYB	Song Linyi (CHN)	51.89 m	Lee Ga-hui (KOR)	50.53 m
Heptathlon	Zhou Jingjing (CHN)	4242 pts	Viktoriya Ryazantseva (KAZ)	3909 pts	Aleksandra Yukevskaya (UZB)	3857 pts

== Medal table ==
Key

The host country is highlighted in lavender blue

Rank	Nation	Gold	Silver	Bronze	Total
1	China	16	11	5	32
2	Chinese Taipei	4	0	1	5
3	Kazakhstan	3	2	3	8
4	Bahrain	3	0	1	4
5	India	2	6	6	14
6	Uzbekistan	2	0	2	4
7	Kuwait	2	0	0	2
8	Japan	1	5	3	9
9	South Korea	1	3	3	7
10	Sri Lanka	1	3	0	4
11	Hong Kong	1	2	0	3
12	Thailand	1	1	0	2
13	Iran	1	0	1	2
13	Qatar*	1	0	1	2
15	Pakistan	1	0	0	1
16	Iraq	0	2	1	3
17	Indonesia	0	1	4	5
18	Lebanon	0	1	1	2
18	Singapore	0	1	1	2
20	North Korea	0	1	0	1
20	United Arab Emirates	0	1	0	1
22	Saudi Arabia	0	0	3	3
23	Malaysia	0	0	2	2
24	Philippines	0	0	1	1
24	Vietnam	0	0	1	1
24	Yemen	0	0	1	1
Totals (26 entries)		40	40	41	121

== See also ==
- 2015 World Youth Championships in Athletics
- 2015 African Youth Athletics Championships

Preceded by Inaugural Championships	1st Asian Youth Athletics Championships; 2015; Doha, Qatar	Succeeded by 2017; Bangkok, Thailand
