= 2019 IAAF World Relays – Mixed 2 × 2 × 400 metres relay =

Mixed 2 × 2 × 400 metres relay at the 2019 IAAF World Relays
- Venue: Yokohama International Stadium
- Dates: 11 May (final)
- Competitors: 16 from 8 nations

Medalists
gold medal	Ce'Aira Brown; Donavan Brazier	United States
silver medal	Catriona Bisset; Josh Ralph	Australia
bronze medal	Ayano Shiomi; Allon Tatsunami Clay	Japan

The Mixed 2 × 2 × 400 metres relay at the 2019 IAAF World Relays was held at the Yokohama International Stadium on 11 May. It was the first time that this event was held at the IAAF World Relays or indeed any senior level major international competition. Each team had to comprise one man and one woman, who would each run twice, but could be lined up in any order.

== Summary ==
This event mimics high-intensity interval training. The athletes each have to run a high intensity 400 metres, followed by another high intensity 400 metres, only allowing enough rest time for their partner to run around the track once.

Given the option to put men or women first in the order, Kenya and Papaua New Guinea put their men up first, both charging out to an early lead, with Papaua New Guinea's Daniel Paul trying to mark Kenya's Collins Kipruto. Down the final straight, Kipruto opened up a 15-metre lead before the handoff. 30 metres further back, the USA's Ce'Aira Brown had a narrow lead over Belarusian Marina Arzamasova and Australia's Catriona Bisset. With the huge lead and no interference, Kenya's Eglay Nafuna Nalyanya tripped as she took the baton. By the time Donavan Brazier took the USA's baton, Nalyanya was already halfway around the first turn. Over the course of his lap, he led the group of men back to within 2 metres of the Kenyan lead by the handoff, all of them swallowing Papaua's Donna Koniel in the process. Kipruto was bouncing up and down waiting to run again, Brown more sedate in her preparation. Once they had the batons in hand again, Brown stayed with Kipruto through the first turn, separating from the other women by 10 metres through the first turn. Kipruto began to separate down the backstretch, coming off the final turn, Brown had a debt to pay for her early speed. Ayano Shiomi from the home team of Japan and Bisset came back to pass her, half a straightaway behind Kipruto. Australia's Josh Ralph took the baton with a 5-metre lead over Brazier. Brazier took care of that in the first turn and was off into no man's land chasing a tired Nalyanya still 30 metres ahead. By the final turn, it was obvious the lead was not enough; led by Brazier, three men were coming fast. Brazier passed Nalyanya before the straightaway, but Ralph was 2 metres behind him and Japan's Allon Tatsunami Clay was just another two metres back. This was still a race. Brazier persevered; Ralph couldn't gain ground and lost a little to Clay toward the end as the USA, Australia and Japan took the medals. After the race was over, Kenya was disqualified because when Nalyanya tripped she stepped momentarily outside the curb to catch her balance.

== Schedule ==
Date	Time	Round
11 May 2019	20:40	Final

All times are local times (UTC-4)

== Results ==
=== Final ===
Rank	Lane	Nation	Athletes	Time	Points
1st place, gold medalist(s)	3	United States	Ce'Aira Brown (W), Donavan Brazier (M)	3:36.92	8
2nd place, silver medalist(s)	4	Australia	Catriona Bisset (W), Josh Ralph (M)	3:37.61	7
3rd place, bronze medalist(s)	6	Japan	Ayano Shiomi (W), Allon Tatsunami Clay (M)	3:38.36	6
4	2	Poland	Anna Dobek (W), Patryk Dobek (M)	3:42.14	5
5	5	Belarus	Maryna Arzamasova (W), Aliaksandr Vasileuskiy (M)	3:51.64	4
6	9	Papua New Guinea	Daniel Baul (M), Donna Koniel (W)	4:04.73	3
7	7	ART	Rose Lokonyen (W), James Chiengjiek (M)	4:08.80	2
	8	Kenya	Collins Kipruto (M), Eglay Nafuna Nalyanya (W)	DQ (3:40.48)	
