= Athletics at the 2026 Asian Games – Women's 10,000 metres =

Women's 10,000 metres at the 2026 Asian Games
- Venue: Mizuho Park Athletic Stadium, Nagoya
- Date: 24 September 2026
- Competitors: 13 from 10 nations
- Winning time: 32:39.18

Medalists
gold medal	Winfred Yavi	Bahrain
silver medal	Nozomi Tanaka	Japan
bronze medal	Seema Kumari	India

The women's 10,000 metres competition at the 2026 Asian Games took place on 24 September 2026 at the Mizuho Park Athletic Stadium in Nagoya, Japan. Winfred Yavi of Bahrain won the gold medal, Nozomi Tanaka of Japan won the silver and Seema Kumari of India won the bronze.

== Schedule ==
All times are Japan Standard Time (UTC+09:00)

Schedule
Date	Time	Event
24 September 2026	17:55	Final

== Records ==
Prior to this competition, the existing world, Asian and Games records were as follows.

World Record	Beatrice Chebet (KEN)	28:54.15	Eugene, United States	24 May 2024
Asian Record	Wang Junxia (CHN)	29:31.78	Beijing, China	7 September 1993
Games Record	Sun Yingjie (CHN)	30:28.26	Busan, South Korea	7 October 2002

== Results ==
Rank	Athlete	Time	Gap	Notes
1st place, gold medalist(s)	Winfred Yavi (BRN)	32:39.18	—	
2nd place, silver medalist(s)	Nozomi Tanaka (JPN)	32:41.54	+2.36	
3rd place, bronze medalist(s)	Seema Kumari (IND)	32:50.05	+10.87	
4	Daisy Jepkemei (KAZ)	33:03.21	+24.03	SB
5	Ruth Jebet (BRN)	33:22.21	+43.03	
6	Nguyễn Thị Oanh (VIE)	33:44.92	+1:05.74	
7	Mariia Korobitskaia (KGZ)	33:54.47	+1:15.29	
8	Jo Ha-rim (KOR)	34:34.66	+1:55.48	
9	Nomin Bayartogtokh (MGL)	35:54.33	+3:15.15	
10	Vanessa Lee (SGP)	36:00.95	+3:21.77	NR
11	Santoshi Shrestha (NEP)	36:20.84	+3:41.66	
12	Nicole Sui Xuan Low (SGP)	36:48.31	+4:09.13	PB
13	Lê Thị Tuyết Mai (VIE)	38:00.87	+5:21.69	
