= 2019 IAAF World Relays =

Athletics competition in Yokohama, Japan

IAAF World Relays Yokohama 2019
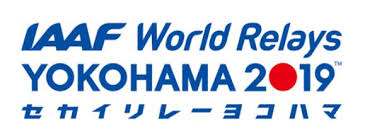
- Host city: Yokohama, Japan
- Events: 9
- Dates: 11–12 May
- Main venue: Yokohama International Stadium

The 2019 IAAF World Relays was held in Yokohama, Japan from May 11 to May 12, 2019. Two new events were established for 2019, both mixed events: the 2 × 2 × 400 m relay and the shuttle hurdles relay. The first event replaced the 4 × 800 m relay that featured at previous events.

== Medal summary ==
=== Men ===
Event	Gold		Silver		Bronze	
4 × 100 metres relay	Brazil; Rodrigo do Nascimento; Jorge Vides; Derick Silva; Paulo André de Oliveira	38.05	United States; Mike Rodgers; Justin Gatlin; Isiah Young; Noah Lyles; Cameron Burrell	38.07	Great Britain; Chijindu Ujah; Harry Aikines-Aryeetey; Adam Gemili; Nethaneel Mitchell-Blake	38.15
4 × 200 metres relay	United States; Christopher Belcher; Bryce Robinson; Vernon Norwood; Remontay McClain	1:20.12	South Africa; Simon Magakwe; Chederick van Wyk; Sinesipho Dambile; Akani Simbine; Jon Seeliger; Anaso Jobodwana	1:20.42 AR	Germany; Maurice Huke; Patrick Domogala; Aleixo-Platini Menga; Robin Erewa	1:21.26 NR
4 × 400 metres relay	Trinidad and Tobago; Deon Lendore; Jereem Richards; Asa Guevara; Machel Cedenio	3:00.81	Jamaica; Demish Gaye; Akeem Bloomfield; Rusheen McDonald; Nathon Allen; Javon Francis	3:01.57	Belgium; Dylan Borlée; Robin Vanderbemden; Jonathan Borlée; Jonathan Sacoor; Julien Watrin	3:02.70

=== Women ===
Event	Gold		Silver		Bronze	
4 × 100 metres relay	United States; Mikiah Brisco; Ashley Henderson; Dezerea Bryant; Aleia Hobbs	43.27	Jamaica; Gayon Evans; Natasha Morrison; Sashalee Forbes; Jonielle Smith; Sherone Simpson	43.29	Germany; Lisa Marie Kwayie; Alexandra Burghardt; Gina Lückenkemper; Rebekka Haase; Lisa Mayer	43.68
4 × 200 metres relay	France; Carolle Zahi; Estelle Raffai; Cynthia Leduc; Maroussia Paré	1:32.16 NR	China; Liang Xiaojing; Wei Yongli; Kong Lingwei; Ge Manqi	1:32.76 AR	Jamaica; Elaine Thompson; Stephenie Ann McPherson; Shelly-Ann Fraser-Pryce; Shericka Jackson	1:33.21
4 × 400 metres relay	Poland; Małgorzata Hołub-Kowalik; Patrycja Wyciszkiewicz; Anna Kiełbasińska; Justyna Święty-Ersetic	3:27.49	United States; Jaide Stepter; Shakima Wimbley; Jessica Beard; Courtney Okolo; Jordan Lavender; Joanna Atkins	3:27.65	Italy; Maria Benedicta Chigbolu; Ayomide Folorunso; Giancarla Trevisan; Raphaela Lukudo; Elisabetta Vandi; Chiara Bazzoni	3:27.74

=== Mixed ===
Event	Gold		Silver		Bronze	
4 × 400 metres relay details	United States; My'Lik Kerley; Joanna Atkins; Jasmine Blocker; Dontavius Wright; Brionna Thomas; Olivia Baker	3:16.43	Canada; Austin Cole; Aiyanna Stiverne; Zoe Sherar; Philip Osei; Alicia Brown	3:18.15	Kenya; Jared Momanyi; Maureen Thomas; Hellen Syombua; Aron Koech	3:19.43
2 × 2 × 400 metres relay details	United States; Ce'Aira Brown; Donavan Brazier	3:36.92	Australia; Catriona Bisset; Josh Ralph	3:37.61	Japan; Ayano Shiomi; Allon Tatsunami Clay	3:38.36
Shuttle hurdles relay details	United States; Christina Clemons; Freddie Crittenden; Sharika Nelvis; Devon Allen; Queen Harrison; Ryan Fontenot	54.96	Japan; Ayako Kimura; Shunya Takayama; Masumi Aoki; Taio Kanai	55.59	Only two finishing teams	

== Medal table ==
* Host nation (Japan)

Rank	Nation	Gold	Silver	Bronze	Total
1	United States (USA)	5	2	0	7
2	Brazil (BRA)	1	0	0	1
2	France (FRA)	1	0	0	1
2	Poland (POL)	1	0	0	1
2	Trinidad and Tobago (TRI)	1	0	0	1
6	Jamaica (JAM)	0	2	1	3
7	Japan (JPN)*	0	1	1	2
8	Australia (AUS)	0	1	0	1
8	Canada (CAN)	0	1	0	1
8	China (CHN)	0	1	0	1
8	South Africa (RSA)	0	1	0	1
12	Germany (GER)	0	0	2	2
13	Belgium (BEL)	0	0	1	1
13	Great Britain (GBR)	0	0	1	1
13	Italy (ITA)	0	0	1	1
13	Kenya (KEN)	0	0	1	1
Totals (16 entries)		9	9	8	26

== Team standings ==
Teams scored for every place in the top 8 with 8 points awarded for first place, 7 for second, etc. The overall points winner was given the Golden Baton.

The host country is highlighted in lavender blue

Rank	Nation	Points
1	United States	54
2	Jamaica	27
3	Japan	27
4	Germany	18
5	Poland	17
6	Brazil	16
7	China	15
8	Italy	15
9	France	13
10	Great Britain	13

== Participating nations ==
43 nations took part in the competition.

- ART
- Australia
- Bahamas
- Belarus
- Belgium
- Brazil
- Canada
- Chile
- Chinese Taipei
- Colombia
- Czech Republic
- Denmark
- Dominican Republic
- Ecuador
- Finland
- France
- Germany
- Ghana
- Great Britain
- India
- Indonesia
- Ireland
- Italy
- Jamaica
- Japan
- Kazakhstan
- Kenya
- Lithuania
- Netherlands
- Nigeria
- Papua New Guinea
- Poland
- China
- South Africa
- Switzerland
- Thailand
- Trinidad and Tobago
- Turkey
- Uganda
- Ukraine
- United States
- Venezuela
- Zimbabwe
