= Athletics at the 2025 Summer World University Games – Women's 5000 metres =

Women's 5000 metres at the 2025 Summer World University Games
- Venue: Lohrheidestadion
- Location: Bochum, Germany
- Dates: 24 July (heats); 26 July (final)
- Competitors: 28 from 21 nations
- Winning time: 15:34.57 PB

Medalists
gold medal	Julia David-Smith	France
silver medal	Seema	India
bronze medal	Emily Jane Parker	Great Britain

The women's 5000 metres event at the 2025 Summer World University Games was held in Bochum, Germany, at Lohrheidestadion on 24 and 26 July.

== Records ==
Prior to the competition, the records were as follows:

Record	Athlete (nation)	Time (s)	Location	Date
Games record	Jessica Augusto (POR)	15:28.78	Bangkok, Thailand	13 August 2007

== Results ==
=== Heats ===
First 8 in each heat (Q) qualified for the final.

==== Heat 1 ====
Place	Athlete	Nation	Time	Notes
1	Sarah Wanjiru	Kenya	16:28.66	Q
2	Mariana Machado	Portugal	16:31.07	Q
3	Julia David-Smith	France	16:32.99	Q
4	Andrea Romero	Spain	16:33.40	Q
5	Emily Parker	Great Britain	16:33.85	Q
6	Emmy van den Berg	Netherlands	16:34.06	Q
7	Pia Schlattmann	Germany	16:34.23	Q
8	Elise Coates	Canada	16:38.16	Q
9	Marvorous Orishaba	Uganda	16:47.28	PB
10	Yonca Kutluk	Turkey	16:47.53	
11	Sanjana Singh	India	17:04.21	
12	Nadia Potgieter	South Africa	17:16.95	
13	Nayana Bilingas Waththage	Sri Lanka	18:08.34	

==== Heat 2 ====
Place	Athlete	Nation	Time	Notes
1	Judy Jepkoech Kosgei	Kenya	15:53.91	Q, PB
2	Ma Xiuzhen	China	15:54.77	Q
3	Seema	India	15:55.33	Q
4	Carolina Schäfer	Germany	15:55.69	Q
5	Phoebe Anderson	Great Britain	15:55.74	Q
6	Agate Caune	Latvia	15:59.19	Q
7	Rasara Wijesuriya	Sri Lanka	16:00.30	Q, PB
8	Bronte Oates	Australia	16:00.56	Q
9	Alice Seguin	France	16:06.11	
10	Shea Ruhly	United States	16:07.53	
11	Wakana Hashimoto	United States	16:17.90	
12	Kristine Meinert Rød	Norway	16:24.91	
13	Ashley Maguire	Canada	16:40.79	
14	Peyton Leigh	New Zealand	16:58.34	
15	Estefania Aristizabal	Colombia	18:18.68	

=== Final ===
Place	Athlete	Nation	Time	Notes
1st place, gold medalist(s)	Julia David-Smith	France	15:34.57	PB
2nd place, silver medalist(s)	Seema	India	15:35.86	SB
3rd place, bronze medalist(s)	Emily Parker	Great Britain	15:36.12	
4	Phoebe Anderson	Great Britain	15:40.07	
5	Pia Schlattmann	Germany	15:40.19	PB
6	Andrea Romero	Spain	15:41.21	PB
7	Carolina Schäfer	Germany	15:41.82	PB
8	Mariana Machado	Portugal	15:44.77	
9	Judy Jepkoech Kosgei	Kenya	15:45.26	PB
10	Sarah Wanjiru	Kenya	15:46.26	
11	Rasara Wijesuriya	Sri Lanka	15:52.60	PB
12	Agate Caune	Latvia	15:52.94	
13	Bronte Oates	Australia	15:59.05	
14	Elise Coates	Canada	16:13.85	PB
15	Emmy van den Berg	Netherlands	16:29.42	
—	Ma Xiuzhen	China	DNF	
