= 2017 Asian Youth Athletics Championships =

2nd Asian Youth Athletics Championships
- Dates: 20–23 May
- Host city: Bangkok, Thailand
- Venue: National Stadium
- Level: Youth
- Events: 40
- Records set: 17

The 2017 Asian Youth Athletics Championships was the second edition of the biennial, continental athletics competition for Asian athletes aged fifteen to seventeen. It was held at the National Stadium in Bangkok, Thailand from 20–23 May. Organised by the Athletics Association of Thailand, a total of forty events were contested with the events divided evenly between the sexes. The event programme mirrored that of the previous IAAF World Youth Championships in Athletics, with the exception of a boy's decathlon, rather than the octathlon.

China comfortably topped the medal table (as it did in 2015) with sixteen gold medals and 30 medals in total (a quarter of those on offer). Its dominance was slanted towards the girls' events, with Chinese topping 13 of the 20 women's podiums. Chinese Taipei retained its position of next best with six golds in a total of fifteen, closely followed by India on five golds in a 14-medal haul.

Feng Lulu was the outstanding athlete of the meet, taking the girls' 100 metres and 200 metres before claiming the sprint medley relay title with the Chinese team, resulting in three championship records. Her compatriot Pan Youqi was the triple jump winner as well as long jump runner-up. Hong Kong's Chan Pui Kei was the only other athlete to claim three medals, being twice runner-up to Feng individually and taking third in the relay. Guo Pei Yu was a minor medallist in both shot put and discus throw events. Halomoan Edwin Binsar was the only male athlete to reach two individual podiums, being the 400 metres hurdles champion and 110 metres hurdles bronze medallist.

The regional event preceded the 2017 World U18 Championships in Athletics, where several Chinese athletes went on to global success. Liu Zhekai was the boy's javelin throw winner there and on the girls side Niu Chunge and Gong Luying also won the pole vault and long jump titles, respectively. Zhang Yao, third in the racewalk in Bangkok, improved to take the world under-18 gold. Among the world minor medallists were boy's hammer thrower Damneet Singh and Taipei hurdler Lu Hao-hua.

== Medal summary ==
=== Men ===
Event	Gold		Silver		Bronze	
100 metres (wind: −0.1 m/s)	Gurindervir Singh (IND)	10.77	Muhammad Aiedal Sa Adon (MAS)	10.80	Choi Sun-jae (KOR)	10.81
200 metres (wind: +0.4 m/s)	Shin Min-kyu (KOR)	21.48^{[b]}	Sittiphon Donpritee (THA)	21.69	Suriya Taemchan (THA)	21.86
400 metres	Ifan Anugrah Setiawan (INA)	47.47 CR	Muhammad Ilham Suhaimi (MAS)	48.16	Akshay Nain (IND)	48.49
800 metres^{[a]}	Abishek Mathew (IND)	1:54.99 CR	Harsha Dissanayaka Mudiyansela (SRI)	1:54.99	Qi Zhan (CHN)	1:55.25
1500 metres	Wei Yan (CHN)	3:50.65	Kaishin Hattori (JPN)	3:55.04	Park Jong-hak (KOR)	3:58.74
3000 metres	Sharif Elatawneh (JOR)	8:35.49	Noor Aldeen Al-Humaidha (YEM)	8:42.88	Amir Zamanpour (IRI)	8:49.34
110 metres hurdles	Lu Hao-hua (TPE)	13.45^{[c]}	Ning Xiaohan (CHN)	13.66	Halomoan Edwin Binsar (INA)	13.73
400 metres hurdles	Halomoan Edwin Binsar (INA)	51.96 CR	Huang Ting-hsuan (TPE)	52.49	Navodya Sankalpa Sobana Handigei (SRI)	53.86
2000 metres steeplechase	Hasan Saad Al-Asdi (IRQ)	5:58.34	Nguyễn Trung Cường (VIE)	6:01.16	Mohammed Al-Suleimani (OMN)	6:13.33
Medley relay	India (IND); Palender Kumar; Gurindervir Singh; Manish; Akshay Nain	1:55.62	Chinese Taipei (TPE); Yue Liu Hao-cyuan; Lu Hao-hua; Ye Cing-hua; Huang Ting-hsuan	1:55.71	Hong Kong (HKG); Tse Yee Hn Rico; Ma Chi Fai; Chan Ching Fung; Wong Shek On Zion	1:56.11
10,000 m walk	Sanjay Kumar (IND)	45:30.39	Masaru Suzuki (JPN)	45:47.41	Yao Zhang (CHN)	46:12.58
High jump	Cao Võ Ngọc Long (VIE)	2.10 m	Sun Qihao (CHN)	2.03 m	Hussain Nasser Al-Shawakir (KSA)	2.00 m
Pole vault	Kasinpob Chomchanad (THA)	5.00 m CR	Yang Lucheng (CHN)	4.85 m	Idan Fauzan Richsan (INA)	4.80 m
Long jump	Lee Seung-jun (KOR)	7.49 m =CR	Wen Hua-yu (TPE)	7.38 m	Koki Wada (JPN)	7.30 m
Triple jump	Muhammad Nazri Mustafa (MAS)	15.05 m	Huang Hao-wen (TPE)	14.78 m	Yu Jianming (CHN)	14.71 m
Shot put	Yang Po-en (TPE)	19.40 m	Mohit (IND)	18.82 m	Kanta Matsuda (JPN)	18.59 m
Discus throw	Abhay Gupta (IND)	56.47 m CR	Sahil Silwal (IND)	54.58 m	Ngu Ing Bau (MAS)	52.48 m
Hammer throw	Liu Yuxuan (CHN)	71.16 m	Damneet Singh (IND)	70.29 m	Nitesh Poonia (IND)	69.76 m
Javelin throw	Liu Zhekai (CHN)	77.25 m	Avinash Yadav (IND)	70.09 m	Kentaro Nakamura (JPN)	69.89 m
Decathlon	Liu Tsu-yuan (TPE)	5982 pts	Mohit (IND)	5976 pts	Reza Kefayati (IRI)	5904 pts

- ^{a} Mathew was declared the winner in a photo finish, being given a time of 1:54.991, two thousandths ahead of Mudiyansela
- ^{b} Shin Mink-yu of Korea set a championship record of 21.45 seconds in the preliminary rounds.
- ^{c} Hao Hua Lu of Chinese Taipei set a championship record of 13.40 seconds in the preliminary rounds.

=== Women ===
Event	Gold		Silver		Bronze	
100 metres (wind: +0.4 m/s)	Feng Lulu (CHN)	11.77 CR	Chan Pui Kei (HKG)	11.91	Gong Luying (CHN)	12.07
200 metres (wind: +0.5 m/s)	Feng Lulu (CHN)	24.06 CR	Chan Pui Kei (HKG)	24.57	Abigeiru Fuka Ido (JPN)	24.60
400 metres	Mo Jaidie (CHN)	55.19	Wang Jou-hsuan (TPE)	55.81	Maryam Mohebbi (IRI)	55.94
800 metres	Louris Danoun (SYR)	2:14.15 CR	Zhu Haihong (CHN)	2:14.23	Kamila Radjabova (UZB)	2:15.21
1500 metres	Li Chunhui (CHN)	4:40.09	Bahareh Jahantigh (IRI)	4:51.26	Kittikarn Suharitdumrong (THA)	4:52.75
3000 metres	Gyong Choe-il (PRK)	10:00.96	Đoàn Thu Hằng (VIE)	10:02.18	Seema (IND)	10:05.27
100 metres hurdles	Lin Ting-wei (TPE)	14.08	Sayuri Nagasaki (JPN)	14.23	Shing Choyan (HKG)	14.29
400 metres hurdles	Liang Yina (CHN)	59.71 CR	Han Le Thi Hong (VIE)	1:00.66	Wu Pei-shan (TPE)	1:00.87
2000 metres steeplechase	Suk Kim-hyang (PRK)	7:02.77	Ngô Thị Khánh Ny (VIE)	7:04.25	Hae Kim-mi (PRK)	7:10.82
Medley relay	China (CHN); Feng Lulu; Tao Yanan; Liang Yina; Mo Jiadie	2:09.63 CR	Thailand (THA); Jirawan Chutrakun; Preechaporn Pluempan; Tawanchat Chanbu; Kitiya Nguphimai	2:15.65	Hong Kong (HKG); Hui Man Natalie; Wong Tsz Shan; Chan Pui Kei; Fung Cheuk Lam	2:16.17
5000 m walk	Wu Wei-ciao (TPE)	25:41.36	Zhou Xiaomin (CHN)	26:04.42	Gao Wenjing (CHN)	26:53.61
High jump	Marya Mabdulhameed Abdulelah (IRQ)	1.73 m	Nguyễn Lan Anh (VIE)	1.69 m	Olga Shlentova (UZB)	1.69 m
Pole vault	Niu Chunge (CHN)	4.15 m CR	Zhang Qianru (CHN) Lin Ying-tung (TPE)	3.70 m	Not awarded	
Long jump	Gong Luying (CHN)	6.11 m CR	Pan Youqi (CHN)	5.99 m	Yuki Fujiyama (JPN)	5.82 m
Triple jump	Pan Youqi (CHN)	12.73 m	Laura Akhmetova (KAZ)	12.41 m	Karunia Nur Gem Ilang (INA)	11.98 m
Shot put	Yu Tianxiao (CHN)	17.51 m CR	Shi Hongmei (CHN)	17.50 m	Guo Pei-yu (TPE)	15.66 m
Discus throw	Liu Quantong (CHN)	47.78 m CR	Guo Pei-yu (TPE)	45.74 m	Park Sun-jin (KOR)	44.29
Hammer throw	Ji Li (CHN)	67.81 m CR	Grace Wong Xiu Mei (MAS)	59.00 m	Reihaneh Arani (IRI)	55.41 m
Javelin throw	Liao Yu (CHN)	56.29 m	Wang Ying (CHN)	55.07 m	Park A-yeong (KOR)	49.35 m
Heptathlon	Hsiang Chia-li (TPE)	4985 pts CR	Roksana Khudoyarova (UZB)	4653 pts	Sarifa Rzakuliyeva (KAZ)	4501 pts

== Medal table ==
Key

The host country is highlighted in lavender blue

Rank	Nation	Gold	Silver	Bronze	Total
1	China	16	9	5	30
2	Chinese Taipei	6	7	2	15
3	India	5	5	3	13
4	South Korea	2	0	4	6
5	Indonesia	2	0	3	5
6	North Korea	2	0	1	3
7	Iraq	2	0	0	2
8	Vietnam	1	5	0	6
9	Malaysia	1	3	1	5
10	Thailand*	1	2	2	5
11	Jordan	1	0	0	1
11	Syria	1	0	0	1
13	Japan	0	3	5	8
14	Hong Kong	0	2	3	5
15	Iran	0	1	4	5
16	Uzbekistan	0	1	2	3
17	Kazakhstan	0	1	1	2
17	Sri Lanka	0	1	1	2
19	Yemen	0	1	0	1
20	Oman	0	0	1	1
20	Saudi Arabia	0	0	1	1
Totals (21 entries)		40	41	39	120

== See also ==
- 2017 World Youth Championships in Athletics
- 2017 African Youth Athletics Championships

Preceded by 2015; Doha, Qatar	2nd Asian Youth Athletics Championships; 2017; Bangkok, Thailand	Succeeded by 2019; Hong Kong
