= Allon Clay =

Japanese middle-distance runner

Personal information
- Full name: Allon Tatsunami Clay
- Born: 25 March 2002 (age 24)

Sport
- Sport: Athletics
- Event: Middle-distance running
Medal record
Men's athletics
Representing Japan
World Relays
| Bronze medal – third place | 2019 Yokohama | Mixed 2×2×400 m |
Asian Youth Championships
| Gold medal – first place | 2019 Hong Kong | 800 m hurdles |

Allon Tatsunami Clay (born 25 March 2002) is a Japanese middle-distance runner who primarily runs the 800 metres. He is a Japanese indoor national record and Asian indoor record holder.

== Biography ==
Clay grew up in Japan, but is of American descent. His father Andrew being from Ironton, Ohio, and a member of the American Navy stationed in Japan. In 2019, Clay set a Japanese high school, under-18 and under-20 record for the 800 metres with a time of 1:46.59.

Clay won the 800 metres gold medal at the 2019 Asian Youth Athletics Championships. That year, he won the bronze medal at the 2019 IAAF World Relays in the Mixed 2 x 2 x 400 metres relay in Yokohama, Japan in May 2019, running alongside Ayano Shiomi. In June 2019, as a 17-year-old won the Japanese senior 800 metres national title, beating the six-time defending champion and Japanese record holder Sho Kawamoto in a time of 1:46.59. Later that year, he agreed to move to the United States to study at Texas A & M University.

In February 2021, as a freshman, Clay ran an indoor personal best 1:48.45 in the 800m at the Tyson Invitational in Fayetteville, Arkansas. His time ranked seventh on the Texas Aggies all-time list.

Having transferred to Penn State University ahead of the 2025 season, Clay won the men's 800 meters at the 2025 Big Ten Conference Championships, running 1:47.93 for the win. He was a semi-finalist at the 2025 NCAA Division I Outdoor Track and Field Championships in June. He placed fourth in the 800 metres final in the 800 metres at the Japanese Championships in July, running 1:46.72.

On 31 January 2026, he set a new Japanese indoor National record with a time of 1:45.17 for the 800 metres at the Penn State National Open in Philadelphia. The following month, Clay broke the Penn State 1000m school record at the David Hemery Valentine Invitational, and ran 1:15.47 on 27 February 2026 for the 600 metres at the Big Ten Conference Championships in Indianapolis. Competing for Penn State he qualified for the 2026 NCAA Indoor Championships, placing third in the final behind Jamaican pair Tyrice Taylor and Rivaldo Marshall.

Clay reached the final representing Japan over 800 m at the 2026 World Athletics Indoor Championships in Toruń, Poland, running 1:46.47 in his semi-final. In doing so, he became Japan's first senior world finalist in the 800 m. In May, Clay set a meet record of 1:45.11 for the 800 metres at the Big Ten Championships, breaking the previous record set by fellow Penn State runner Isaiah Harris in 2018. On 29 May, Clay ran a personal best 1:44.63 to win the 800 m at NCAA East Regionals in Lexington, Kentucky. He placed fourth with a time of 1:44.98 in the final of the 800 metres at the 2026 NCAA Outdoor Championships.
