= Zhong Tao =

Chinese high jumper (born 2001)

Personal information
- Native name: Chinese: 钟涛
- Nationality: China
- Born: 12 August 2002 (23 years, 355 days old)
- Home town: Tongling, Anhui, China

Sport
- Sport: Sport of athletics
- Event: Pole vault

Achievements and titles
- National finals: 2021 Chinese Champs; • Pole vault, 4th; 2021 National Games; • Pole vault, 7th; 2023 Chinese Indoors; • Pole vault, 2nd (silver); 2023 Chinese Champs; • Pole vault, 3rd (bronze); 2024 Chinese Indoors; • Pole vault, 1st (gold)
- Personal bests: PV: 5.75m (2024) LJ: 6.92m (−0.5) (2020)
Medal record
Men's athletics
Representing China
Asian Indoor Championships
Gold medal – first place	2024 Tehran	Pole vault
Asian U18 Championships
Gold medal – first place	2019 Hong Kong	Pole vault
- Updated on 6 April 2024

Zhong Tao (Note: In this Chinese name, the family name is Zhong.) (Chinese: 钟涛; born 12 August 2002) is a Chinese pole vaulter. He became a national indoor champion in 2024 and then won the gold medal at the Asian Indoor Championships.

== Career ==
Zhong earned his first international title in 2019, winning the Asian U18 Championships. He also equaled the championship record of 5.00 metres.

After finishing 4th and 7th at the 2021 Chinese championships and National Games, Zhong improved his best to 5.61 m in May 2023, qualifying him for the 2023 World Athletics Championships. At those World Championships, Zhong finished 18th overall and did not qualify for the final.

At the 2024 Astana Indoor Meeting, Zhong finished 3rd in the pole vault. He won his first national title at the 2024 Chinese Indoor Athletics Championships, beating Huang Bokai and Yao Jie in an anticipated match-up. At the 2024 Asian Indoor Athletics Championships, Zhong became Asian champion as he jumped 5.65 m, 0.05 metres better than the field.

Zhong finished tied for 4th at the 2024 Xiamen Diamond League.

== Personal life ==
Zhong is from Tongling, Anhui, China. He attended Yangjiashan Elementary School, where he began to train for athletics. He has been described as the "big brother" of the Chinese pole vaulting world.

== Statistics ==
=== Personal best progression ===
Pole Vault progression
#	Mark	Pl.	Competition	Venue	Date	Ref.
1	4.60 m	2nd place, silver medalist(s)	National Grand Prix, Youth Olympic Games Trials	Zhuzhou, China	16 Apr 2018	
2	5.00 m	3rd place, bronze medalist(s)	National Indoor Grand Prix	Nanjing, China	18 Feb 2019	
4	5.15 m	2nd place, silver medalist(s)	National Youth Games	Luoyang, China	27 Jun 2019	
5	5.40 m	4th	Chinese Athletics Championships	Shaoxing, China	12 Jun 2021	
6	5.45 m	1st place, gold medalist(s)	CAA Training Base Indoor Permit Meeting	Nanjing, China	4 Mar 2022	
7	5.50 m	1st place, gold medalist(s)	National Indoor Grand Prix	Jinan, China	15 Feb 2023	
8	5.61 m	4th	National Grand Prix	Taizhou, Jiangsu, China	25 May 2023	
9	5.75 m	1st place, gold medalist(s)	Chinese Athletics Championships	Tianjin, China	28 Mar 2024	
