= South Asian Athletics Federation =

Governing body for athletics in South Asia

- Sport: Athletics
- Jurisdiction: South Asia
- Abbreviation: SAAF
- Regional affiliation: Asian Athletics Association
- President: Dr. Lalit K. Bhanot.

The South Asian Athletics Federation (SAAF) is the governing body for athletics in South Asia, responsible for organizing regional competitions such as the South Asian Senior Athletics Championships, South Asian U20 Athletics Championships, and South Asian Cross Country Championships.

The SAAF has 8 members: Afghanistan, Bangladesh, Bhutan, India, Maldives, Nepal, Pakistan, and Sri Lanka.

== History ==
The 2024 SAAF Cross Country Championships (Islamabad 2025) held in Fatima Jinnah Park, Islamabad, Pakistan, were pushed back to 2025 by the SAAF due to smog on 15 November. It was held on 23 February 2025.

The 2025 South Asian Senior Athletics Championships were postponed as a result of the 2025 India–Pakistan standoff.

== See also ==
- Athletics Federation of India
- Bangladesh Athletics Federation
- Athletics Federation of Pakistan
- World Athletics
