= Emily Parker (runner) =

British long-distance runner (born 2004)

Personal information
- Full name: Emily Jane Parker
- Born: 11 August 2004 (age 21)

Sport
- Sport: Athletics
- Event(s): Middle-distance running, Steeplechase

Achievements and titles
- Personal best(s): 1500m: 4:09.63 (Loughborough, 2025); 3000m: 9:06.89 (Loughborough, 2025); 5000m: 15:33.85 (Birmingham, 2025); 3000m Steeplechase: 9:45.64 (Bergen, 2025); Marathon: 3:03:07 (Valencia, 2025)
Medal record
Women's athletics
Representing Great Britain
Summer World University Games
| Bronze medal – third place | 2025 Bochum | 5000 m |

Emily Jane Parker (born 11 August 2004) is a British middle- and long-distance runner and steeplechaser.

== Biography ==
Parker is from Dorset, and is a member of Poole Athletics Club. In May 2025, she won the 3000 metres competing for Team England at the Loughborough International in a personal best time of 9:06.89. She ran a 4:09.63 personal best for the 1500 metres at the British Milers Grand Prix in June 2025, finishing ahead of Holly Dixon and Lyla Belshaw.

She was named in the British team for the 2025 European Athletics U23 Championships in Bergen, Norway and placed fifth in the final of the 3000 metres steeplechase. She was named in the British team for the 2025 Summer World University Games in Germany, where she won the bronze medal in the women's 5000 metres. On 2 August, she placed fourth in the final of the 3000 metres steeplechase at the 2025 UK Athletics Championships in Birmingham in 9:47.76.

Parker was runner-up in the under-23 race at the Liverpool Cross Challenge on 22 November 2025, finishing behind Megan Harris. She was selected as part of the British team for the under-23 race at the 2025 European Cross Country Championships, placing 13th as the highest British finisher as the British team placed fifth overall. Parker won the 3000 metres race at the British Universities & Colleges Sport (BUCS) Indoor Championships in February 2026. The following month, she placed second at the BUCS Cross-Country Championships in Leicestershire, also winning a team gold medal with Loughborough University.

== Personal life ==
She studied at Loughborough University.
