= Chamod Yodasinghe =

Sri Lankan sprinter (born 2000)

Personal information
- Full name: Chamod Mahinsasa Yodasinghe
- Born: 28 January 2000 (age 26) Peradeniya, Sri Lanka
- Education: St. Mary's College, Kegalle
- Military career
- Branch: Sri Lanka Army
- Service years: 2019–present
- Unit: Electrical and Mechanical Engineers

Sport
- Sport: Track and field
- Events: 60 m, 100 m

Achievements and titles
- Personal bests: 60 m: 6.63 (2025); 100 m: 10.27 (2025)
Medal record
Men's athletics
Representing Sri Lanka
South Asian Championships
Gold medal – first place	2025 Ranchi	100 m
Gold medal – first place	2025 Ranchi	4×100m

Chamod Mahinsasa Yodasinghe (born 28 January 2000) is a Sri Lankan sprinter.

== Early & Personal life ==
He attended Dorawaka Siriniwasa MV and St. Mary's College, Kegalle. In 2019, he joined the Sri Lanka Army as part of the Electrical and Mechanical Engineers Unit.

== Career ==
He excelled in long jump and sprinting as a youngster before focusing on sprint events. He began to be coached by Sanjeewa Weerakkody in Kandy in 2019, having previously been coached in Kegalle by Laliith Liyanage. He placed fifth at the South Asian Junior Athletic Championship in the 100 metres race and in 2019 won the Sri Lankan U20 championship 100 m in a time of 10.90 seconds.

He ran a personal best for the 60 m of 6.63 seconds at the National Short Track Championship in February 2025. He was selected for the 2025 World Athletics Indoor Championships in the men's 60 metres, where he became the first Sri Lankan male athlete to qualify for the semi-finals of a sprint event at a World Indoor Championships, having qualified from the preliminary heats in a time of 6.70 seconds.

In July 2026, he competed in the 100 metres at the 2026 Commonwealth Games in Glasgow, Scotland, without advancing to the semi-finals.
