= 2023 Asian U18 Athletics Championships =

5th Asian U18 Athletics Championships
- Dates: 27–30 April 2023
- Host city: Tashkent, Uzbekistan
- Venue: Uzbekistan Athletics Federation Stadium
- Level: U18 (Youth)
- Events: 40
- Records set: 1 AU18R, 14 CR

The 2023 Asian U18 Athletics Championships was the fifth edition of the biennial, continental athletics competition for Asian athletes aged 15 to 17. It was held at the Uzbekistan Athletics Federation Stadium in Tashkent, Uzbekistan, from 27 to 30 April 2023.

== Medal summary ==
=== Men ===
Event	Gold		Silver		Bronze	
100 metres (wind: +1.2 m/s)	Wu Haolin; China	10.55	Chan Yat Lok; Hong Kong	10.61	Nattapon Sookkasem; Thailand	10.68
200 metres (wind: +0.7 m/s)	Meng Desheng; China	21.05 CR	Zheng Keli; China	21.19	Abhay Singh; India	21.39
400 metres	Nuansi Sarawut; Thailand	46.92 CR	Lin Chao-cheng; Chinese Taipei	47.95	Hsiung Chen-yo; Chinese Taipei	47.97
800 metres	Chiang Yi-an; Chinese Taipei	1:55.46	Mani Mokhtarinikou; Iran	1:55.68	Abdulmajeed Yousef Al-Ghafry; Saudi Arabia	1:56.18
1500 metres	Priyanshu; India	3:57.37	Rahul Sarnaliya; India	3:59.43	Arsalan Hamidi; Iran	4:02.08
3000 metres	Aman Kumar; India	8:39.15	Yogeswar Rajasekaran; India	8:39.85	Zainulabdeen Mokhles Al-Shamkhee; Iraq	8:42.36
110 metres hurdles (91.4 cm) (wind: +1.9 m/s)	Wu Yu-ting; Chinese Taipei	13.53	Wang Zijian; China	13.67	Sandeep Vinodkumar; India	13.80
400 metres hurdles (83.8 cm)	Mahamat Abakar; Qatar	50.91 CR	Bapi Hansda; India	51.38	Kupa Liyanage Akalanka; Sri Lanka	51.40
2000 metres steeplechase	Yusuf Azariyan; Iran	5:55.84	Sumit Rathee; India	5:58.69	Mustafa Mohsen Al-Khazaali; Iraq	6:01.97
Medley relay (100+200+300+400)	Thailand (THA); Chutithat Pruksorranan; Wirayut Daenkhanob; Nattapon Sookkasem; Nuansi Sarawut	1:52.59 CR	India (IND); Abhay Singh; Muhammad Reyan; Sharan Megavarnam; Navpreet Singh	1:52.96	China (CHN); Yue Haotian; Wu Haolin; Meng Desheng; Wang Zijian	1:53.40
10,000 m walk	Feng Kai; China	42:33.10 CR	Li Yapeng; China	43:03.00	Babendra Singh; India	43:16.95
High jump	Devdavs Ismailov; Uzbekistan	2.06 m	Nilupul Pehesara; Sri Lanka	2.01 m	Đỗ Hoàng Nghĩa; Vietnam; Kim Hyeon-sik; South Korea	2.01 m
Pole vault	Lian Chunxin; China	5.01 m	Thushen Silva; Sri Lanka	4.70 m	Maksim Balabin; Kazakhstan	4.8065 m
Long jump	Zhang Shenming; China	7.64 m (w)	Li Chengliang; China	7.61 m	Abdullah Al-Azemi; Uzbekistan	7.42 m
Triple jump	Zhang Huayong; China	15.67 m CR	Kim Eung-yo; South Korea	15.08 m	Gan Ziyi; China	15.05 m
Shot put (5 kg)	Park Si-hoon; South Korea	20.11 m CR	Abduazim Rakhmatullayev; Uzbekistan	17.47 m	Abdulrahman Al-Qahtani; Kuwait	17.42 m
Discus throw (1.5 kg)	Choi Jae-no; South Korea	54.59 m	Ritik; India	54.03 m	Abduazim Rakhmatullayev; Uzbekistan	54.00 m
Hammer throw (5 kg)	Mahdi Haftcheshmeh; Iran	68.64 m	Ali Al-Naser; Kuwait	67.66 m	Narpat Singh; India	67.26 m
Javelin throw (700 g)	Chiu Shao-en; Chinese Taipei	68.51 m	Arjun Arjun; India	66.99 m	Maman Nurdaulet; Kazakhstan	65.71 m
Decathlon	Ivan Sening; Kazakhstan	6590 pts	Sina Afshinfar; Iran	6317 pts	Lucas Fun Le Cong; Singapore	6277 pts

=== Women ===
Event	Gold		Silver		Bronze	
100 metres (wind: +0.9 m/s)	Layla Kamal; Bahrain	11.77	Abinaya Rajarajan; India	11.82	Li Tsz To; Hong Kong	11.84
200 metres (wind: +0.4 m/s)	Li Tsz To; Hong Kong	24.27	Rezoana Mallick Heena; India	24.38	Layla Kamal; Bahrain	24.48
400 metres	Rezoana Mallick Heena; India	52.98 CR	Sofya Kidenko; Kazakhstan	55.74	Karlsson Jane Christa Ming Suet; Hong Kong	55.82
800 metres	Li Yaxuan; China	2:10.47	Chen Jie-an; Chinese Taipei	2:12.59	Nirmali Wickramasinghe; Sri Lanka	2:17.04
1500 metres	Nguyen Khanh Linh; Vietnam	4:35.15	Aiana Bolatbekkyzy; Kazakhstan	4:36.75	Maftuna Akhmedova; Uzbekistan	4:39.57
3000 metres	Vanshika; India	10:15.16	Anju Bala; India	10:22.86	Bogdana Grigoryeva; Kazakhstan	10:29.19
100 metres hurdles (76.2 cm) (wind: +0.9 m/s)	Wu Binbin; China	13.20 AU18R	Chloe Pak Hoi Man; Hong Kong	13.60	Yi Yu Pui; Hong Kong	14.49
400 metres hurdles	Anastassiya Koloda; Kazakhstan	1:00.63	Yekaterina Koloda; Kazakhstan	1:02.57	Sabrina Goyibnazarova; Uzbekistan	1:04.06
2000 metres steeplechase	Muhayyo Muhammadjonova; Uzbekistan	7:10.45	Chu Chien-yu; Chinese Taipei	7:16.54	Nigoray Amirkhon; Tajikistan	7:17.42
Medley relay (100+200+300+400)	India (IND); Mohur Mukherjee; Abinaya Rajarajan; Shireen Ahluwalia; Rezoana Mallick Heena	2:11.21	Kazakhstan (KAZ); Angelina Volodkina; Mariya Shuvalova; Milana Zubareva; Sofya Kidenko	2:12.39	Hong Kong (HKG); Wong Wang Chi; Li Tsz To; Chow Chi Kiu; Karlsson Jane Christa Ming Suet	2:12.76
5000 m walk	Yang Xizhen; China	22:32.61 CR	Liu Biling; China	22:56.30	Aarti; India	24:29.14
High jump	Pooja Singh; India	1.77 m	Arina Malyugina; Kazakhstan	1.75 m	Emiliya Rudina; Uzbekistan	1.69 m
Pole vault	Zhang Zixuan; China	3.80 m	Elmira Kabirova; Kazakhstan	3.70 m	Riza Mukametkali; Kazakhstan	3.60 m
Long jump	Wu Binbin; China	6.41 m CR	Sharifa Davronova; Uzbekistan	6.22 m	Mubassina Muhammad; India	5.90 m
Triple jump	Sharifa Davronova; Uzbekistan	13.99 m CR	Wu Jialing; China	12.70 m	Elizaveta Yakimenko; Kazakhstan	12.06 m
Shot put (3 kg)	Tian Xinyi; China	18.56 m CR	Xu Mengshu; China	16.57 m	Anupriya Valliyot Sasi; India	16.37 m
Discus throw	Su Yixin; China	50.69 m CR	Mahliyo Makhmudova; Uzbekistan	35.17 m	Shahzoda Shozodova; Uzbekistan	32.44 m
Hammer throw (3 kg)	Zhang Jiale; China	66.81 m	Zahra Memari; Iran	54.18 m	Masoumeh Yousefishorehgol; Iran	53.58 m
Javelin throw (500 g)	Fang Yuting; China	51.23 m	Yoon Eun-hwan; South Korea	49.01 m	Cyrene Hui; Hong Kong	47.86 m
Heptathlon	Irina Konichsheva; Kazakhstan	5154 pts	Mohur Mukherjee; India	4862 pts	Anna Chikalova; Uzbekistan	4739 pts

== Medal table ==
* Host nation (Uzbekistan)

Rank	Nation	Gold	Silver	Bronze	Total
1	China (CHN)	15	7	2	24
2	India (IND)	6	11	7	24
3	Kazakhstan (KAZ)	3	6	5	14
4	Uzbekistan (UZB)*	3	3	7	13
5	Chinese Taipei (TPE)	3	3	1	7
6	Iran (IRI)	2	3	2	7
7	South Korea (KOR)	2	2	1	5
8	Thailand (THA)	2	0	1	3
9	Hong Kong (HKG)	1	2	5	8
10	Bahrain (BHR)	1	0	1	2
10	Vietnam (VIE)	1	0	1	2
12	Qatar (QAT)	1	0	0	1
13	Sri Lanka (SRI)	0	2	2	4
14	Kuwait (KUW)	0	1	1	2
15	Iraq (IRQ)	0	0	2	2
16	Saudi Arabia (KSA)	0	0	1	1
16	Singapore (SIN)	0	0	1	1
16	Tajikistan (TJK)	0	0	1	1
Totals (18 entries)		40	40	41	121

Preceded by 2022; Kuwait	5th Asian U18 Athletics Championships; 2023; Uzbekistan	Succeeded by 2025; Saudi Arabia
