= 2025 South Asian Athletics Championships =

Athletics competition in Ranchi, India

4th South Asian Athletics Championships
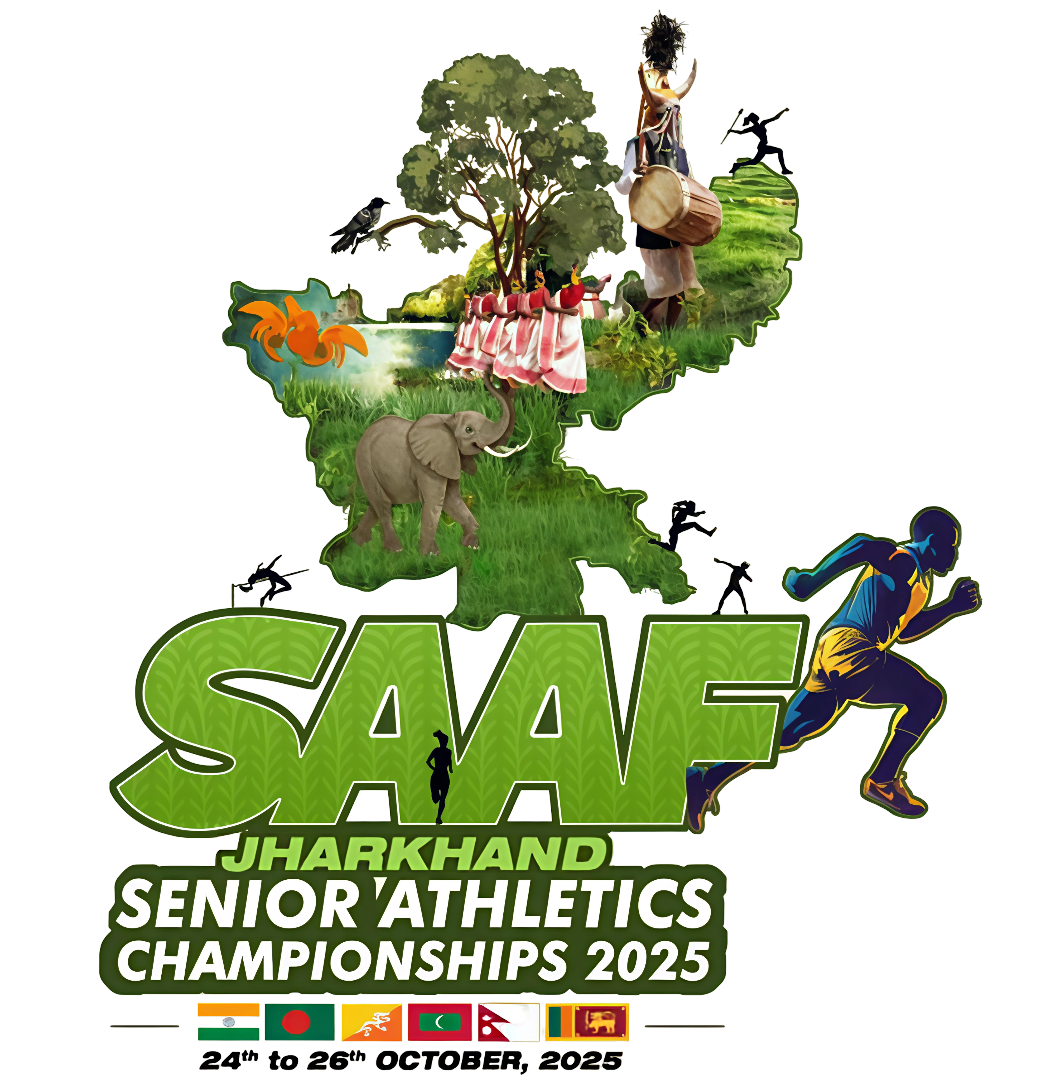
- Venue: Birsa Munda Football Stadium
- Location: Ranchi, India
- Start date: 24 October 2025
- End date: 26 October 2025
- Nations: 6 (Bangladesh, Bhutan, India, Maldives, Nepal and Sri Lanka)

The 2025 South Asian Athletics Championships was an athletics competition held from 24 to 26 October 2025 at the Birsa Munda Football Stadium, Ranchi, India. This was the fourth edition of the competition, and the event was organized under the aegis of the South Asian Athletics Federation and hosted by the Athletics Federation of India.

== Medal table ==
* Host nation (India)

Rank	Nation	Gold	Silver	Bronze	Total
1	India*	20	20	18	58
2	Sri Lanka	16	14	10	40
3	Nepal	0	2	4	6
4	Bangladesh	0	0	3	3
5	Maldives	0	0	1	1
Totals (5 entries)		36	36	36	108

== Results ==
=== Men ===
Event	Gold		Silver		Bronze	
100 m	Chamod Yodasinghe; Sri Lanka	10.30 CR	Pranav Gurav; India	10.32	Harsh Raut; India	10.42
200 m	Sandeep Singh; India	21.23	Indusara Vidushan; Sri Lanka	21.42	Prathik Maharana; India	21.44
400 m	Kalinga Kumarage; Sri Lanka	46.21	Mohammed Ashfaq; India	46.56	Kalhara Indupa; Sri Lanka	46.81
800 m	Harsha Karunarathne; Sri Lanka	1:51.96	Som Bahadur; Nepal	1:52.03	Mogali Venkatram Reddy; India	1:52.37
1500 m	Arjun Waskale; India	3:54.58	Rusiru Chathuranga; Sri Lanka	3:55.12	Rojideen Nifras; Sri Lanka	3:55.95
5000 m	Prince Kumar; India	14:22.17	Vicknaraj Vakshan; Sri Lanka	14:23.21	Mukesh Bahadur Pal; Nepal	14:25.54
10,000 m	Abhishek; India	30:29.46	Rajan Rokaya; Nepal	30:39.15	Prince Kumar; India	31:17.37
110 m hurdles	Manav Rajanarayanan; India	13.78	Roshan Ranathunga; Sri Lanka	13.90	Krishik Manjunatha; India	14.01
400 m hurdles	Ruchit Mori; India	50.10	Ayomal Akalanka; Sri Lanka	50.29	Karna Bag; India	51.06
High jump	Tharindu Dasun; Sri Lanka	2.17 m	Rohit; India	2.15 m	Aadarsh Ram; India	2.09 m
Long jump	Mohd Sazid; India	7.68 m	Wishmitha Kumara; Sri Lanka	7.56 m	Sarun Payasingh; India	7.52 m
Triple jump	Pasindu Malshan; Sri Lanka	16.19 m	Dinesh V India	16.14 m	Sebastian V S India	15.88 m
Shot put	Samardeep Gill; India	19.59 m	Ravi Kumar; India	17.95 m	Suseenthirakumar Mithunraj; Sri Lanka	14.68 m
Discus throw	Kirpal Singh Batth; India	56.22 m	Nirbhay Singh; India	56.00 m	Milantha Sampath; Sri Lanka	49.35 m
Hammer throw	Damneet Singh; India	66.99 m	Ashish Jakhar; India	64.68 m	Damith Dharmasena; Sri Lanka	46.55 m
Javelin throw	Rumesh Tharanga; Sri Lanka	84.29 m	Sumeda Ranasinghe; Sri Lanka	81.62 m	Uttam Patil; India	76.30 m
4 × 100 m relay	Chamod Yodasinghe; Pramudith Silva; Indusara Vidushan; Sandun Diyalawatta; Sri Lanka	39.99	Prathik Maharana; J Singh Dhillon; Harsh Raut; Pranav Gurav; India	40.65	Islam Md Lushad; Motalab Abdul; Rahman Md Tarek; Ismail Md; Bangladesh	40.94
4 × 400 m relay	Omel Sashintha; Ayomal Akalanka; Kalinga Kumarage; Kalhara Indupa; Sri Lanka	3:05.12	Rohit Chaudhary; Tarandeep Singh; Mohammed Ashfaq; Sharan Megavarnam; India	3:05.38	Rana Md Masud; Rahman Md Tarek; R Najimul Hossain; Islam Md Lushad; Bangladesh	3:15.00

=== Women ===
Event	Gold		Silver		Bronze	
100 m	Fathima Shafiya Yamick; Sri Lanka	11.53 CR	Amasha de Silva; Sri Lanka	11.72	Sudeshna Shivankar; India	11.78
200 m	Fathima Shafiya Yamick; Sri Lanka	23.58 CR	Sakshi Chavan; India	23.91	Neeru Pathak; India	24.06
400 m	Neeru Pathak; India	53.15	Olimba Steffi; India	54.13	Sayuri Mendis; Sri Lanka	54.18
800 m	Amandeep Kaur; India	2:04.66	Takshima Nuhansa; Sri Lanka	2:06.51	Thota Sankeertana; India	2:07.09
1500 m	Sanjana Singh; India	4:25.36	Nimali Liyanarachchi; Sri Lanka	4:25.52	Kajal Kanwade; India	4:26.21
5000 m	Sanjana Singh; India	15:38.70	Seema Kumari; India	15:40.55	Santoshi Shrestha; Nepal	16:36.61 NR
10,000 m	Rasara Wijesuriya; Sri Lanka	34:39.95	Ravina Gayakwad; India	34:45.47	Santoshi Shrestha; Nepal	34:47.77 NR
100 m hurdles	Nandhini Kongan; India	13.56	Moumita Mondal; India	13.81	Lakshika Sugandhi; Sri Lanka	13.98
400 m hurdles	Dasuni Kaushalya; Sri Lanka	58.66	Araliya Sathsarani; Sri Lanka	59.24	Olimba Steffi; India	1:00.21
High jump	Reet Rathor; India	1.76 m	Pehansa Gamage; Sri Lanka	1.74 m	Supriya B India	1.74 m
Long jump	Madushani Herath; Sri Lanka	6.23 m	Mubassina Mohammed; India	6.07 m	Bhavani Yadav; India	6.02 m
Triple jump	Madushani Herath; Sri Lanka	13.36 m	Poorva Sawant; India	13.03 m	Sashini Upeksha; Sri Lanka	12.79 m
Shot put	Yogita; India	15.85 m	Shiksha; India	15.83 m	Ovini Chandrasekera; Sri Lanka	13.03 m
Discus throw	Seema Kaliramna; India	55.14 m	Nidhi; India	52.18 m	Vinodeni Lakmali; Sri Lanka	43.01 m
Javelin throw	Dilhani Lekamge; Sri Lanka	60.14 m	Karishma Sanil; India	55.06 m	Deepika; India	54.87 m
4 × 100 m relay	Fathima Shafiya Yamick; Amasha de Silva; Dhananjana Fernando; Rumeshika Rathnayaka; Sri Lanka	44.70	Sudeshna Shivankar; Sakshi Chavan; Jilna Madathile Veettil; Tamanna; India	44.93	Faiz Hawwa Muznaa; Shafeeu Ziva Moosa; S Aishath Shabaa; Nizaar Ahnaa; Maldives	47.79
4 × 400 m relay	Manisha Kumari; Olimba Steffi; Poovamma Raju; Neeru Pathak; India	3:34.70	Nadeesha Ramanayake; Sayuri Mendis; Nishendra Fernando; Jithma Wijekoon; Sri Lanka	3:35.71	Khatun Sharifa; Khatun Mst Barsha; Dewan Sumaya; Runa Nusrat Jahan; Bangladesh	3:55.63

=== Mixed ===
Event	Gold		Silver		Bronze	
4 × 400 m relay	Rashid; Mohammed Ashfaq; Neeru Pathak; Olimba Steffi; India	3:20.13	Kalinga Kumarage; Nadeesha Ramanayake; Kalhara Idupa; Sayuri Mendis; Sri Lanka	3:20.85	Ram Prasad Tharu; Som Bahadur Kumal; R Kumari Tharu; Jayerani Tharu; Nepal	3:37.16
