= Ce'Aira Brown =

American middle-distance runner

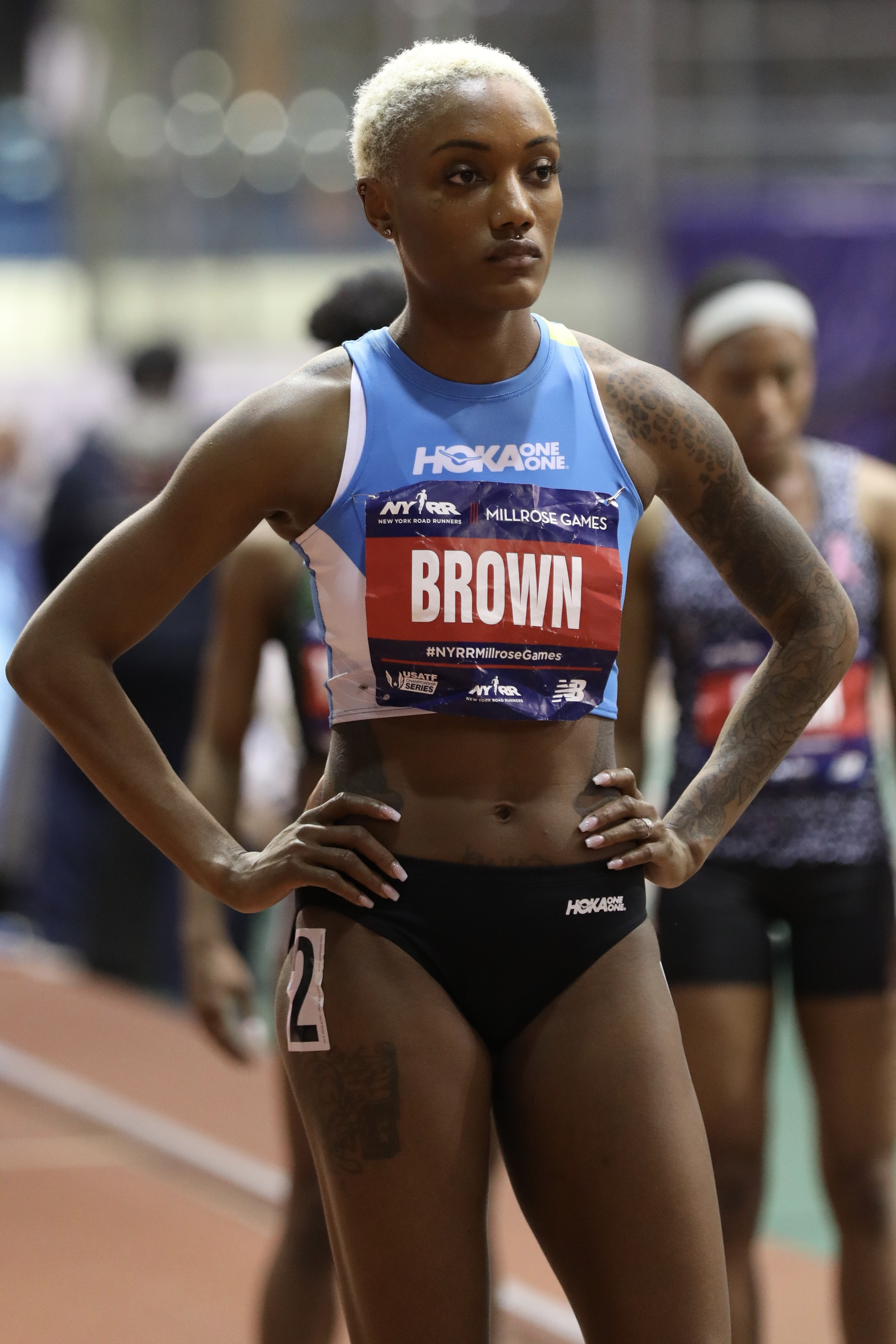
- Brown in 2019

Personal information
- Born: November 4, 1993 (age 32)
- Education: Hampton University

Sport
- Country: United States
- Sport: Athletics; Track and field
- Event: Middle-distance running
- Club: HOKA One One; New York New Jersey Track Club
- Turned pro: 2017
- Retired: 2022
Medal record
Representing the United States
Women's athletics
World Relays
Gold medal – first place	2019 Yokohama	2 × 2 × 400 m relay

Ce'Aira Brown (born November 4, 1993) is an American middle-distance runner. Representing the United States at the 2019 World Athletics Championships, she placed 8th in the final of the women's 800 metres. Brown placed third in the 800 meters at 2019 The Match Europe v USA. In 2023 Brown was inducted into the MEAC Hall of Fame.

== US Championships ==
Year	Place	Mark
2019 USA Outdoor Track and Field Championships	9th	2:03.26
2019 USA Indoor Track and Field Championships	3rd	2:35.62
2018 USA Outdoor Track and Field Championships	3rd	1:58.65
2018 USA Indoor Track and Field Championships	4th	2:03.11
2017 USA Outdoor Track and Field Championships	11th	2:03.37
2017 USA Indoor Track and Field Championships	7th	1:27.94
2016 United States Olympic Trials (track and field)	34th	2:06.78

== College ==
Ce'Aira Brown is a 5-time All-American, set Hampton University records indoor track and field records in 5 events: 600 metres 1:33.21, 800 metres 2:04.72, Mile 4:51.63, 1000 metres 2:51.17, 3000 metres 10:06.42 and outdoor track and field records in 3 events: 800 metres 2:02.82, 1500 metres 4:28.23, and 4 × 400-meter relay 3:32.30 (Tanisha Greene, Le'Quisha Parker, Ce'aira Brown, Malekah Holland).

As a Hampton Lady Pirates, Brown earned 2 NCAA Division I All-American track and field 800 meters honors (2016 NCAA Division I Indoor Track and Field Championships and 2016 NCAA Division I Outdoor Track and Field Championships). Brown scored 41 points at the 2016 MEAC Outdoor Track & Field Championships by placing in the 800 metres, 1500 metres, 5000 metres, 10,000 metres, and 4 × 400-meter relay. Brown won 800 m at the 2016 IC4A/ECAC Indoor Track and Field Championships. Brown scored 40 points at the 2016 MEAC Indoor Track & Field Championships after winning the 800 metres, Mile, 3000 metres and Distance medley relay.

Brown earned MEAC all-conference Mid-Eastern Athletic Conference in cross country in 2015 after placing 4th in 18:10.6. Brown won the 800 meters title at 2015 IC4A/ECAC Outdoor Track & Field Championships in 2:04.81. Brown scored 36 points at the 2015 MEAC Outdoor Track & Field Championships by winning in the 800 metres, 1500 metres, 4 × 400 m relay and placing third in the 5000 metres. Brown placed 15th in the 800 m at 2015 NCAA Division I Indoor Track and Field Championships where she earned All-American track and field 800 meters honor. Brown scored 35 points at the 2015 MEAC Indoor Track & Field Championships by winning in the 800 metres, Mile, 4 × 400 m relay and running a Personal Best time of 17:50.64 to place third in the 5000 metres.

Brown earned MEAC all-conference in cross country in 2014 when she placed 6th. Brown placed 9th in 800 meters at 2014 NCAA Division I Outdoor Track and Field Championships in 2:05.01. Brown won 3 MEAC titles at 2014 MEAC Outdoor Track & Field Championships 800 metres 2:09.14, 1500 metres 4:34.68, and 4 × 400-meter relay 3:38.25 and 4 MEAC titles in 2014 MEAC Indoor Track & Field Championships 800 metres, Mile, 4 × 400-meter relay and Distance medley relay.

As a Langston University Lion, 2013 National Association of Intercollegiate Athletics outdoor track and field championships, Brown placed 9th in the 400 metres final in 56.00. At the 2013 Red River Athletic Conference Outdoor Track & Field Championships, Brown won 400 meters, 4 × 400 metres relay, placed second at 1500 meters, 4 × 800 metres relay and 12th in the 800 metres. At the 2013 NAIA Indoor Track & Field Championships, Brown placed 11th in the 400 meters in a time of 57.80 and 5th in the 4 × 400 metres relay with Dearra McNeal, Lauren Corbitt, Kierra Patterson, Ce'Aira Brown in a time of 3:47.28.

== High School ==
Brown placed 12th in the 800 meters at 2012 New Balance Indoor Nationals in 2:12.79 behind winner Ajeé Wilson and runner-up Mary Cain.

Philadelphia Public League champions from Overbrook High School track & field include Olympic & World Champion Gold Medalist Jon Drummond, Track & Field World Junior Championships Medalist & NCAA champion was her Head Coach Deworski Odom, NCAA Division I All-American Tanqueray Hayward and Toya Brown. Brown set Overbrown HS records in 400 meters (55.59), 800 meters (2:11.01) and 4 × 400 meters relay.

Representing Overbrook High School (Philadelphia) at Pennsylvania Interscholastic Athletic Association 3A state championship
Year	Cross Country	Outdoor Track
2011-12	251st 22:15.0	
2010-11	DNQ	5th in the 400 m (56.91)
2009-10		2nd in the 400 m (57.40)
