= 2019 Asian Youth Athletics Championships =

3rd Asian Youth Athletics Championships
- Dates: 15–17 March
- Host city: Hong Kong
- Venue: Tseung Kwan O Sports Ground
- Level: Youth
- Events: 40

The 2019 Asian Youth Athletics Championships was the third edition of the biennial, continental athletics competition for Asian athletes aged 15 to 17. It was held at the Tseung Kwan O Sports Ground in Hong Kong from 15 to 17 March. Organised by the Hong Kong Amateur Athletic Association, a total of forty events will be contested with the events divided evenly between the sexes. The host was announced in January 2019 by Asian Athletics Association.

Each Federation can enter maximum of 2 athletes in each individual event, while host team can enter maximum of 3 athletes in each individual event. For relay event, each Federation can only enter 1 team to participate.

This championship was the first large scale competition situated in Hong Kong since the 2009 East Asian Games. Kwan Kee, the Chairman of Hong Kong Amateur Athletics Association was satisfied with the performance of Hong Kong team (1 gold medal and 2 silver medals) and planned to bid for more international track and field events to promote the growth of this sport in Hong Kong.

== Medal summary ==
=== Men ===
Event	Gold		Silver		Bronze	
100 metres (wind: +0.4 m/s)	Ali Khalid Mas (KSA)	10.56	Seiryo Ikeda (JPN)	10.63	Chen Jiapeng (CHN)	10.66
200 metres (wind: -1.9 m/s)	Wang Yen-ho (TPE)	21.86	Shanmuga Srinivas Nalubothu (IND)	21.87	Ali Al-Balushi (OMA)	21.93
400 metres	Abdul Razak Cheramkulangara Rasheed (IND)	48.17	Navishka Weerakoon (SRI)	48.26	Yefim Tarassov (KAZ)	48.59
800 metres	Allon Tatsunami Clay (JPN)	1:50.57 CR	Mathesh Babu (IND)	1:51.48	Sumit Kharab (IND)	1:55.81
1500 metres	Lee Jae-ung (KOR)	3:56.36	Masaya Yanagimoto (JPN)	3:56.56	Ajay (IND)	3:57.25
3000 metres	Ajit Kumar Yadav (NEP)	8:30.32	Amit Jangir (IND)	8:36.34	Gamil Al-Hamati (YEM)	8:38.60
110 metres hurdles	Mohd Irfan Izzan Mohd Fetry (MAS)	13.60	Kentaro Soga (JPN)	13.64	Marc Brian Louis (SGP)	13.74
400 metres hurdles	Marc Brian Louis (SGP)	55.09	Henry Fung (HKG)	55.26	Fahad Mohd Al-Abdulla (QAT)	55.28
2000 metres steeplechase	Ryuji Miura (JPN)	5:42.35 CR	Atul Kumar Bhimsingbhai Gamit (IND)	6:00.45	Li Yunqi (CHN)	6:08.79
Medley relay	India (IND)	1:54.04	Sri Lanka (SRI)	1:55.04	China (CHN)	1:55.45
10,000 m walk	Vishvendra Singh (IND)	44:09.75 CR	Li Junran (CHN)	44:11.17	Paramjeet Singh Bisht (IND)	44:21.96
High jump	Chen Long (CHN)	2.20 m CR	Ma Jia (CHN)	2.16 m	Fu Chao-hsuan (TPE)	2.14 m
Pole vault	Zhong Tao (CHN)	5.00 m =CR	Kazuki Furusawa (JPN)	4.90 m	Deepak Yadav (IND)	4.70 m
Long jump	Wu Guohang (CHN)	7.63 m CR	Ho Kuei-lin (TPE)	7.48 m	Ryutaro Tanaka (JPN)	7.43 m
Triple jump	Sheng Yin-chen (TPE)	15.15 m	Wu Junhui (CHN)	15.12 m	Vishal Mor (IND)	15.09 m
Shot put	Arsalan Ghashghaei (IRI)	19.36 m	Amandeep Singh Dhaliwal (IND)	19.08 m	Peng Yingtei (CHN)	18.59 m
Discus throw	Mohammad Reza Rahmanifar (IRI)	60.24 m CR	Sadegh Samimi (IRI)	59.85 m	Huang Nuo-ya (TPE)	54.93 m
Hammer throw	Vipin Kumar (IND)	69.63 m	Fan Yanfeng (CHN)	66.64 m	Sahand Nouri (IRI)	65.85 m
Javelin throw	Cao Junzi (CHN)	73.25 m	Nodirbek Bekatov (UZB)	71.76 m	Yasumasa Matsushige (JPN)	69.36 m
Decathlon	Usaid Khan (IND)	6952 pts CR	Du Chang-huan (TPE)	6268 pts	Ali Ansari (IND)	5943 pts

=== Women ===
Event	Gold		Silver		Bronze	
100 metres (wind: +0.9 m/s)	Avantika Santosh Narale (IND)	11.97	Hanae Aoyama (JPN)	11.98	Erna Nuryanti (INA)	12.08
200 metres (wind: -0.8 m/s)	Li Yuting (CHN)	23.83 CR	Avantika Santosh Narale (IND)	24.20	Deepthi Jeevanji (IND)	24.78
400 metres	Saki Takashima (JPN)	54.83	Li Fengdan (CHN)	56.07	Aleksandra Zalyubovskaya (KAZ)	56.25
800 metres	Rao Xinyu (CHN)	2:09.03 CR	Pooja (IND)	2:09.32	Maki Ueda (JPN)	2:09.76
1500 metres	Cade Wright (HKG)	4:34.04	Liu Jia (CHN)	4:36.05	Chanthini Chandran (IND)	4:36.09
3000 metres	Rina Kimura (JPN)	9:30.63	Izumi Takamatsu (JPN)	9:59.50	Liu Jingya (CHN)	10:06.94
100 metres hurdles	Thabitha Philip Maheswaran (IND)	13.86	Mayuko Iwasa (JPN)	14.03	Liu Xinyu (CHN)	14.44
400 metres hurdles	Arisa Weruwanarak (THA)	1:00.52	Yang Jui-hsuan (TPE)	1:00.68	Amesha Hettiarachchilge (SRI)	1:01.42
2000 metres steeplechase	Yuzuki Murakami (JPN)	7:06.53	Vassilissa Fakhrutdinova (KAZ)	7:22.88	Fatemeh Sima Shadkam (IRI)	7:32.53
Medley relay	China (CHN); Liu Ziyi; Li Yuting; Li Fengdan; Rao Xinyu	2:10.71	India (IND); Deepthi Jeevanji; Avantika Santosh Narale; Sandra Ajimon Shiny; Priya Mohan	2:10.87	Kazakhstan (KAZ); Margarita Nazarenko; Aleksandra Sytina; Nadezhda Yurchenko; Aleksandra Zalyubovskaya	2:13.79
5000 m walk	Jiao Shuangshuang (CHN)	22:54.69 CR	Yin Lamei (CHN)	22:56.22	Minoru Yabuta (JPN)	23:19.48
High jump	Lu Jiawen (CHN)	1.83 m CR	Lai Yan Hei (HKG)	1.79 m	Chang Chia-yu (TPE)	1.69 m
Pole vault	Polina Ivanova (KAZ)	3.75 m	Lan Jieru (CHN)	3.70 m	Diva Renatta Jayadi (INA) Maberu Fujiie (JPN)	3.55 m
Long jump	Thabitha Philip Maheswaran (IND)	5.86 m	Hua Shihu (CHN)	5.76 m	Ambrikha Narzary (IND)	5.73 m
Triple jump	Li Chunting (CHN)	12.97 m CR	Kim A-young (KOR)	12.15 m	Valeriya Yeryomina (KAZ)	12.02 m
Shot put	Meari Hiroshima (JPN)	16.19 m	Choi Ha-na (KOR)	15.87 m	Chen Yan (CHN)	15.42 m
Discus throw	Yang Xin (CHN)	49.69 m CR	Chen Nuo (CHN)	47.55 m	Shin Yu-jin (KOR)	45.61 m
Hammer throw	Hung Chi-hsien (TPE)	62.80 m	Harshita Sherawat (IND)	61.93 m	Ye Jiayi (CHN)	59.90 m
Javelin throw	Mo Yun (CHN)	54.32 m	Gong Yu (CHN)	53.16 m	Rei Nakamura (JPN)	48.94 m
Heptathlon	Adina Makhsutova (KAZ)	5345 pts CR	Momoko Ito (JPN)	5088 pts	Shakhribonu Gofurjonova (UZB)	4634 pts

== Medal table ==
* Host nation (Hong Kong)

Rank	Nation	Gold	Silver	Bronze	Total
1	China (CHN)	12	11	8	31
2	India (IND)	8	9	9	26
3	Japan (JPN)	6	8	6	20
4	Chinese Taipei (TPE)	3	3	3	9
5	Kazakhstan (KAZ)	2	1	4	7
6	Iran (IRI)	2	1	2	5
7	South Korea (KOR)	1	2	1	4
8	Hong Kong (HKG)*	1	2	0	3
9	Singapore (SGP)	1	0	1	2
10	Malaysia (MAS)	1	0	0	1
10	Nepal (NEP)	1	0	0	1
10	Saudi Arabia (KSA)	1	0	0	1
10	Thailand (THA)	1	0	0	1
14	Sri Lanka (SRI)	0	2	1	3
15	Uzbekistan (UZB)	0	1	1	2
16	Indonesia (INA)	0	0	2	2
17	Oman (OMA)	0	0	1	1
17	Qatar (QAT)	0	0	1	1
17	Yemen (YEM)	0	0	1	1
Totals (19 entries)		40	40	41	121

Preceded by 2017; Bangkok, Thailand	3rd Asian Youth Athletics Championships; 2019; Hong Kong	Succeeded by 2021
