= Yu Yuzhen =

Chinese javelin thrower (born 1998)

Personal information
- Born: 5 March 1998 (age 28)

Sport
- Country: China
- Sport: Track and field
- Event: Javelin throw
Medal record
Women's javelin throw
Representing China
Asian Youth Athletics Championships
Gold medal – first place	2015 Doha	Javelin throw

Yu Yuzhen (born 5 March 1998) is a Chinese track and field athlete competing in javelin throw. She competed in the women's javelin throw event at the 2019 World Athletics Championships held in Doha, Qatar. She did not qualify to compete in the final.

In 2015, she won the gold medal in the women's javelin throw at the Asian Youth Athletics Championships held in Doha, Qatar.
