= Asian U18 Athletics Championships =

Continental athletics competition for Asian athletes

- Status: Active
- Genre: Sports event
- Date: Mid-year
- Frequency: Biennial
- Inaugurated: 2015
- Most recent: 2025
- Organiser: Asian Athletics Association

The Asian U18 Athletics Championships (formerly Asian Youth Athletics Championships) is a biennial, continental athletics competition for Asian athletes, organised by the Asian Athletics Association. First held in 2015, it a youth category event open to athletes aged fifteen and seventeen. The competition was the fourth continental athletics competition to be held for that age level, following in the steps of the South American, Oceanian and African events. Its first edition came at a time of rising interest in such competitions, with the first African championships being held in 2013, and the European Athletics Youth Championships scheduled for the following year. In March 2014, the Asian Athletics Association's president Dahlan Jumaan al-Hamad cited the creation of the championships as a way of boosting the grassroots-level development of the sport in Asia and raise the importance of continental level competition among the region's countries.

== Editions ==
| Ed | Year | Events | Host City | Host Country | Dates | Venue |
|---|---|---|---|---|---|---|
| 1 | 2015 | 40 | Doha | Qatar | 8–11 May | Suheim Bin Hamad Stadium |
| 2 | 2017 | 40 | Bangkok | Thailand | 20–23 May | National Stadium |
| 3 | 2019 | 40 | Hong Kong | Hong Kong | 15–17 March | Tseung Kwan O Sports Ground |
| 4 | 2022 | 40 | Kuwait City | Kuwait | 13–16 October | Al Kuwait Kaifan Stadium |
| 5 | 2023 | 40 | Tashkent | Uzbekistan | 27–30 April | Uzbekistan Athletics Federation Stadium |
| 6 | 2025 | 39 | Qatif | Saudi Arabia | 15–18 April | Prince Nayef Sports City |
| 7 | 2027 | 40 | New Clark City | Philippines | TBA | Athletic Stadium (expected) |

== Championships records ==
=== Boys ===
| Event | Record | Athlete | Nationality | Date | Meet | Place | Ref. |
|---|---|---|---|---|---|---|---|
| 100 m | 10.33 (−0.4 m/s) | Puripol Boonson | Thailand | 14 October 2022 | 2022 Championships | Kuwait City, Kuwait | |
| 200 m | 20.95 (+1.5 m/s) | Cheuk Fung Jasper Koo | Hong Kong | 18 April 2025 | 2025 Championships | Dammam, Saudi Arabia | |
| 400 m | 46.92 | Nuansi Sarawut | Thailand | 28 April 2023 | 2023 Championships | Tashkent, Uzbekistan | |
| 800 m | 1:50.57 | Allon Tatsunami Clay | Japan | 17 March 2019 | 2019 Championships | Hong Kong | |
| 1500 m | 3:50.65 | Yan Wei | China | May 2017 | 2017 Championships | Bangkok, Thailand | |
| 3000 m | 8:26.24 | Tadwi Kishan Narshi | India | 9 May 2015 | 2015 Championships | Doha, Qatar | |
| 110 m hurdles | 13.40 (+0.1 m/s) | Lu Hao-hua | Taiwan | May 2017 | 2017 Championships | Bangkok, Thailand | |
| 400 m hurdles (83.8 cm) | 50.91 | Mahamat Abakar | Qatar | 30 April 2023 | 2023 Championships | Tashkent, Uzbekistan | |
| 2000 m steeplechase | 5:42.35 | Ryuji Miura | Japan | 16 March 2019 | 2019 Championships | Hong Kong | |
| High jump | 2.21 m | Choi Jinwoo | South Korea | 15 October 2022 | 2022 Championships | Kuwait City, Kuwait | |
| Pole vault | 5.00 m | Kasinpob Chomchanad | Thailand | May 2017 | 2017 Championships | Bangkok, Thailand | |
| Pole vault | 5.00 m | Zhong Tao | China | 15 March 2019 | 2019 Championships | Hong Kong | |
| Long jump | 7.63 m (+0.5 m/s) | Wu Guohang | China | 16 March 2019 | 2019 Championships | Hong Kong | |
| Triple jump | 15.67 m (+0.2 m/s) | Zhang Huayong | China | 28 April 2023 | 2023 Championships | Tashkent, Uzbekistan | |
| Shot put (5 kg) | 20.11 m | Park Si-hoon | South Korea | 27 April 2023 | 2023 Championships | Tashkent, Uzbekistan | |
| Discus throw (1.5 kg) | 60.24 m | Mohammad Reza Rahmanifar | Iran | 16 March 2019 | 2019 Championships | Hong Kong | |
| Hammer throw (5 kg) | 75.15 m | Wu Wenji | China | 10 May 2015 | 2015 Championships | Doha, Qatar | |
| Javelin throw (700 g) | 79.11 m | Vladyslav Palyunin | Uzbekistan | 10 May 2015 | 2015 Championships | Doha, Qatar | |
| Decathlon | 6952 pts | Usaid Khan | India | 15–16 March 2019 | 2019 Championships | Hong Kong | |
| Decathlon | 100m (wind) / Long jump (wind) / Shot put / High jump / 400m / 110m H (wind) / Discus / Pole vault / Javelin / 1500m; 11.38 (+0.1 m/s) / 6.53 m (+0.3 m/s) / 13.89 m / 1.88 m / 51.24 / 14.50 (−3.0 m/s) / 38.67 m / 3.80 m / 45.47 m / 4:43.10 | | | | | | |
| 5,000 m walk (track) | 20:21.50 | Ninghao Zhu | China | 16 April 2025 | 2025 Championships | Dammam, Saudi Arabia | |
| 10,000 m walk (track) | 42:33.10 | Feng Kai | China | 28 April 2023 | 2023 Championships | Tashkent, Uzbekistan | |
| Sprint medley relay (1-2-3-4) | 1:51.68 | Hongyu Dai; Jiacheng Hu; Kangbin Liu; Yongjie Li | China | 18 April 2025 | 2025 Championships | Dammam, Saudi Arabia | |

=== Girls ===
| Event | Record | Athlete | Nationality | Date | Meet | Place | Ref. |
|---|---|---|---|---|---|---|---|
| 100 m | 11.77 (+0.4 m/s) | Feng Lulu | China | May 2017 | 2017 Championships | Bangkok, Thailand | |
| 200 m | 23.83 (−0.8 m/s) | Li Yuting | China | 17 March 2019 | 2019 Championships | Hong Kong | |
| 400 m | 52.98 | Rezoana Mallick Heena | India | 28 April 2023 | 2023 Championships | Tashkent, Uzbekistan | |
| 800 m | 2:09.03 | Rao Xinyu | China | 17 March 2019 | 2019 Championships | Hong Kong | |
| 1500 m | 4:19.95 | Dalila Abdulkadir Gosa | Bahrain | 11 May 2015 | 2015 Championships | Doha, Qatar | |
| 3000 m | 9:30.17 | Fatuma Jewaro Chebsi | India | 8 May 2015 | 2015 Championships | Doha, Qatar | |
| 100 m hurdles | 13.20 (+0.9 m/s) | Wu Binbin | China | 28 April 2023 | 2023 Championships | Tashkent, Uzbekistan | |
| 400 m hurdles | 59.55 | Mariam Kareem | United Arab Emirates | 17 April 2025 | 2025 Championships | Dammam, Saudi Arabia | |
| 2000 m steeplechase | 6:44.99 | Sadafbonu Nusratilleva | Uzbekistan | 16 April 2025 | 2025 Championships | Dammam, Saudi Arabia | |
| High jump | 1.83 m | Lu Jiawen | China | 17 March 2019 | 2019 Championships | Hong Kong | |
| Pole vault | 4.15 m | Niu Chunge | China | May 2017 | 2017 Championships | Bangkok, Thailand | |
| Long jump | 6.41 m (+0.6 m/s) | Wu Binbin | China | 27 April 2023 | 2023 Championships | Tashkent, Uzbekistan | |
| Triple jump | 13.99 m (+0.3 m/s) | Sharifa Davronova | Uzbekistan | 29 April 2023 | 2023 Championships | Tashkent, Uzbekistan | |
| Shot put (3 kg) | 18.56 m | Tian Xinyi | China | 30 April 2023 | 2023 Championships | Tashkent, Uzbekistan | |
| Discus throw | 53.81 m | Chenyi Ma | China | 17 April 2025 | 2025 Championships | Dammam, Saudi Arabia | |
| Hammer throw (3 kg) | 67.81 m | Ji Li | China | May 2017 | 2017 Championships | Bangkok, Thailand | |
| Javelin throw (500 g) | 61.97 m | Yu Yuzhen | China | 8 May 2015 | 2015 Championships | Doha, Qatar | |
| Heptathlon | 5345 pts | Adina Makhsutova | Kazakhstan | 16–17 March 2019 | 2019 Championships | Hong Kong | |
| Heptathlon | 100m H (wind) / High jump / Shot put / 200m (wind) / Long jump (wind) / Javelin / 800m; 14.26 (−1.4 m/s) / 1.74 m / 12.04 m / 25.75 (−0.4 m/s) / 5.94 m (+1.4 m/s) / 36.62 m / 2:37.65 | | | | | | |
| 5000 m walk (track) | 22:32.61 | Yang Xizhen | China | 27 April 2023 | 2023 Championships | Tashkent, Uzbekistan | |
| Sprint medley relay (1-2-3-4) | 2:09.63 | Feng Lulu; Tao Yanan; Liang Yina; Mo Jiadie | China | May 2017 | 2017 Championships | Bangkok, Thailand | |

== Medal table ==
Upto 2025

| Rank | Nation | Gold | Silver | Bronze | Total |
|---|---|---|---|---|---|
| 1 | China (CHN) | 78 | 50 | 25 | 153 |
| 2 | India (IND) | 28 | 47 | 38 | 113 |
| 3 | Chinese Taipei (TPE) | 22 | 14 | 11 | 47 |
| 4 | Uzbekistan (UZB) | 13 | 11 | 17 | 41 |
| 5 | Kazakhstan (KAZ) | 12 | 13 | 18 | 43 |
| 6 | Japan (JPN) | 10 | 19 | 14 | 43 |
| 7 | Iran (IRI) | 10 | 9 | 16 | 35 |
| 8 | South Korea (KOR) | 8 | 10 | 14 | 32 |
| 9 | Thailand (THA) | 7 | 9 | 4 | 20 |
| 10 | Hong Kong (HKG) | 6 | 9 | 15 | 30 |
| 11 | Qatar (QAT) | 5 | 5 | 4 | 14 |
| 12 | Indonesia (INA) | 5 | 1 | 11 | 17 |
| 13 | Bahrain (BHR) | 5 | 0 | 2 | 7 |
| 14 | Vietnam (VIE) | 4 | 6 | 3 | 13 |
| 15 | Kuwait (KUW) | 4 | 3 | 4 | 11 |
| 16 | Saudi Arabia (KSA) | 4 | 2 | 9 | 15 |
| 17 | Malaysia (MAS) | 3 | 4 | 4 | 11 |
| 18 | Iraq (IRQ) | 3 | 2 | 5 | 10 |
| 19 | Sri Lanka (SRI) | 2 | 14 | 10 | 26 |
| 20 | Singapore (SIN) | 2 | 3 | 5 | 10 |
| 21 | North Korea (PRK) | 2 | 1 | 1 | 4 |
| 22 | United Arab Emirates (UAE) | 2 | 1 | 0 | 3 |
| 23 | Jordan (JOR) | 1 | 1 | 0 | 2 |
| 23 | Syria (SYR) | 1 | 1 | 0 | 2 |
| 25 | Nepal (NEP) | 1 | 0 | 0 | 1 |
| 25 | Pakistan (PAK) | 1 | 0 | 0 | 1 |
| 27 | Lebanon (LIB) | 0 | 3 | 1 | 4 |
| 28 | Yemen (YEM) | 0 | 1 | 2 | 3 |
| 29 | Oman (OMA) | 0 | 0 | 2 | 2 |
| 29 | Philippines (PHI) | 0 | 0 | 2 | 2 |
| 31 | Tajikistan (TJK) | 0 | 0 | 1 | 1 |
| Totals (31 entries) | | 239 | 239 | 238 | 716 |

== See also ==
- Asian Junior Athletics Championships
- Asian Athletics Championships
