= South Asian Athletics Championships =

Reoccurring athletics competition

The South Asian Senior Athletics Championships is a recurring athletics competition between athletes from South Asian nations, governed by the South Asian Athletics Federation.

== Editions ==
The first edition was held in 1997 with five competing nations: Bangladesh, India, Nepal, Pakistan, and Sri Lanka. The next year, Bangladesh did not compete and the Maldives competed for the first time. During the next edition in 2008, Bangladesh returned with Bhutan making their debut in the competition.

In 2025, Pakistan did not compete, likely due to the 2025 India–Pakistan crisis. The championships were delayed due to the conflict.

Despite being a member of the Federation, Afghanistan never competed.

Edition	Year	Host	Host city	Venue	Dates	Top-ranked team	Refs
1	1997	India	New Delhi		1 December	India	
2	1998	Sri Lanka	Colombo		10–12 November	Sri Lanka	
3	2008	India	Kochi	Maharaja's College Stadium	7–8 March	India	
4	2025	India	Ranchi	Birsa Munda Football Stadium	24–26 October	India	

== Medal table ==
Rank	Nation	Gold	Silver	Bronze	Total
1	India	78	69	56	203
2	Sri Lanka	44	47	46	137
3	Pakistan	6	9	14	29
4	Nepal	0	3	6	9
5	Bangladesh	0	0	4	4
6	Maldives	0	0	1	1
Totals (6 entries)		128	128	127	383

== Championships records ==
=== Men ===
Event	Record	Athlete	Nationality	Date	Location	Ref
100 m	10.30 (±0.0 m/s)	Chamod Yodasinghe	Sri Lanka	24 October 2025	Ranchi, India	
200 m	21.09 (−1.3 m/s)	Sugath Tilakaratne	Sri Lanka	10 November 1998	Colombo, Sri Lanka	
400 m	45.67	Sugath Tilakaratne	Sri Lanka	11 November 1998	Colombo, Sri Lanka	

=== Women ===
Event	Record	Athlete	Nationality	Date	Location	Ref
100 m	11.53 (±0.0 m/s)	Fathima Shafiya Yamick	Sri Lanka	24 October 2025	Ranchi, India	
200 m	23.58 (−0.1 m/s)	Fathima Shafiya Yamick	Sri Lanka	26 October 2025	Ranchi, India	
