= Bahrain at the 2014 Asian Games =

- IOC code: BRN
- NOC: Bahrain Olympic Committee

in Incheon
- Flag bearer: Ali Husain Ali
- Medals Ranked 10th: Gold 9 Silver 6 Bronze 4 Total 19

Asian Games appearances (overview)
- 1974; 1978; 1982; 1986; 1990; 1994; 1998; 2002; 2006; 2010; 2014; 2018; 2022; 2026

Bahrain participated in the 2014 Asian Games in Incheon, South Korea from 19 September to 4 October 2014. The county's competitors won a total of 19 medals, including nine gold medals. With the exception of a bronze, Bahrain won all its medals in athletics events.

== Medal summary ==
=== Medal table ===
Sport	Gold	Silver	Bronze	Total
Athletics	9	6	3	18
Handball	0	0	1	1
Total	9	6	4	19

=== Medalists ===
Medal	Name	Sport	Event
Gold	El Hassan El-Abbassi	Athletics	Men's 10,000 metres
Gold	Abbas Ali Khamis	Athletics	Men's 400 metres hurdles
Gold	Ali Hasan Mahboob	Athletics	Men's marathon
Gold	Kemi Adekoya	Athletics	Women's 400 metres
Gold	Maryam Yusuf Jamal	Athletics	Women's 1500 metres
Gold	Maryam Yusuf Jamal	Athletics	Women's 5000 metres
Gold	Kemi Adekoya	Athletics	Women's 400 metres hurdles
Gold	Ruth Jebet	Athletics	Women's 3000 metres steeplechase
Gold	Eunice Jepkirui Kirwa	Athletics	Women's marathon
Silver	Abubakar Abbas	Athletics	Men's 400 metres
Silver	Rashid Ramzi	Athletics	Men's 1500 metres
Silver	Alemu Bekele Gebre	Athletics	Men's 5000 metres
Silver	Tareq Mubarak Taher	Athletics	Men's 3000 metres steeplechase
Silver	Mimi Belete	Athletics	Women's 1500 metres
Silver	Mimi Belete	Athletics	Women's 5000 metres
Bronze	Albert Kibichii Rop	Athletics	Men's 5000 metres
Bronze	Isaac Korir	Athletics	Men's 10,000 metres
Bronze	Lishan Dula	Athletics	Women's marathon
Bronze	Ali Abdulla Eid; Mahmood Abdulqader; Hasan Al-Fardan; Hasan Al-Samahiji; Jaafar Abdulqader; Sadiq Ali; Mahdi Madan; Mohamed Merza; Mohamed Abdulhusain; Mohamed Al-Maqabi; Jasim Radhi; Jasim Al-Salatna; Husain Ali; Ali Merza; Ali Abdulqader; Husain Al-Sayyad	Handball	Men

== Handball ==
=== Group A ===
Pos	Team	Pld	W	D	L	GF	GA	GD	Pts	Qualification
1	Bahrain	2	2	0	0	83	34	+49	4	Main round
2	Saudi Arabia	2	1	0	1	71	38	+33	2	Main round
3	Mongolia	2	0	0	2	26	108	−82	0	Classification round 9–12

Source: Results

September 20; 12:00	Bahrain	–	Mongolia	Seonhak Handball Gymnasium, Incheon

September 22; 12:00	Saudi Arabia	–	Bahrain	Seonhak Handball Gymnasium, Incheon
