= Athletics at the 2014 Asian Games – Women's marathon =

Women's marathon at the 2014 Asian Games
- Venue: Incheon Asiad Main Stadium
- Dates: 2 October 2014
- Competitors: 17 from 11 nations

Medalists
gold medal	Eunice Kirwa	Bahrain
silver medal	Ryoko Kizaki	Japan
bronze medal	Lishan Dula	Bahrain

The women's marathon event at the 2014 Asian Games was held on 2 October on the streets of Incheon, South Korea with the finish at the Incheon Asiad Main Stadium. Eunice Kirwa from Bahrain won the gold medal.

== Schedule ==
All times are Korea Standard Time (UTC+09:00)

Date	Time	Event
Thursday, 2 October 2014	09:00	Final

== Records ==
Prior to this competition, the existing world, Asian and Games records were as follows.

World Record	Paula Radcliffe (GBR)	2:15:25	London, United Kingdom	13 April 2003
Asian Record	Mizuki Noguchi (JPN)	2:19:12	Berlin, Germany	25 September 2005
Games Record	Naoko Takahashi (JPN)	2:21:47	Bangkok, Thailand	6 December 1998

== Results ==
Legend

- DNS — Did not start

Rank	Athlete	Time	Notes
1st place, gold medalist(s)	Eunice Kirwa (BRN)	2:25:37	
2nd place, silver medalist(s)	Ryoko Kizaki (JPN)	2:25:50	
3rd place, bronze medalist(s)	Lishan Dula (BRN)	2:33:13	
4	Eri Hayakawa (JPN)	2:33:14	
5	Yue Chao (CHN)	2:33:20	
6	He Yinli (CHN)	2:33:46	
7	Kim Hye-gyong (PRK)	2:36:38	
8	Kim Seong-eun (KOR)	2:38:16	
9	Kim Hye-song (PRK)	2:38:55	
10	Iuliia Andreeva (KGZ)	2:39:25	
11	Gulzhanat Zhanatbek (KAZ)	2:40:45	
12	Choi Bo-ra (KOR)	2:45:04	
13	Myint Myint Aye (MYA)	2:56:34	
14	Marina Khmelevskaya (UZB)	2:57:17	
15	Chow Chi Ngan (HKG)	2:58:34	
16	Sworupa Khadka (NEP)	3:00:41	
—	Sitora Hamidova (UZB)	DNS	
