= 2013 Arab Athletics Championships =

18th Arab Athletics Championships
- Dates: 21–24 May 2013
- Host city: Doha, Qatar
- Participation: 17 nations

The 2013 Arab Athletics Championships was the eighteenth edition of the international athletics competition between Arab countries that took place in Doha, Qatar from 21–24 May 2013.

Syria was excluded from the event because of the ongoing civil war and Libya did not send a team. Morocco topped the medals table with eleven gold medals in its total of 22, which it won mainly in the women's section of the competition. Algeria placed second with eight golds among its 19 medals. Bahrain had the greatest medal count overall with 22, and ranked third as it only claimed five golds. Egypt, Qatar and Tunisia each took four gold medals at the competition.

== Medal summary ==
=== Men ===
Event	Gold		Silver		Bronze	
100 metres (wind: -0.8 m/s)	Samuel Francis (QAT)	10.31	Aziz Ouhadi (MAR)	10.38	Barakat Al-Harthi (OMN)	10.45
200 metres	Aziz Ouhadi (MAR)	20.46	Fahhad Mohammed Al Subaie (KSA)	20.55	Ayman Mohamed Ahmed Said (EGY)	20.81
400 metres	Yousef Masrahi (KSA)	44.72	Ismail Al-Sabiani (KSA)	46.08	Ali Khamis Abbas (BHR)	46.25
800 metres	Musaeb Abdulrahman Balla (QAT)	1:45.90	Abraham Kipchirchir Rotich (BHR)	1:46.52	Abdulaziz Ladan Mohammed (KSA)	1:46.70
1500 metres	Ayanleh Souleiman (DJI)	3:39.44	Benson Seurei (BHR)	3:40.07	Seddik Mikou (MAR)	3:40.81
5000 metres	Albert Rop (BHR)	13:52.54	Zelalem Bacha (BHR)	13:57.17	Mumin Gala (DJI)	14:08.62
10,000 metres	Alemu Bekele (BHR)	29:43.45	Isaac Korir Kedikou (BHR)	29:48.59	Mumin Gala (DJI)	29:54.20
Half marathon	Bilal Mohamed (MAR)	1:07:02	Billisuma Shugi (BHR)	1:08:22	Methkal Abu Drais (JOR)	1:09:57
110 metres hurdles	Ilyes Mekdal (ALG)	13.63 CR	Abdulaziz Al Mandil (KUW)	13.72	Othman Hadj Laâzib (ALG)	13.94
400 metres hurdles	Miloud Rahmani (ALG)	50.52	Mohamed Sghaier (TUN)	50.94	Gamal Abdelnasir Abubaker (QAT)	51.12
3000 metres steeplechase	Abdelmajid Touil (ALG)	8:57.09	Tareq Mubarak Taher (BHR)	8:59.50	Hamid Ezzine (MAR)	9:1.69
4 × 100 metres relay	Oman (OMN); Fahad Khamis Said Al Jabri; Barakat Al-Harthi; Abdullah Al-Sooli; Ahmed Mohamed Al-Merjabi	39.83	Iraq (IRQ); Dhafer Soadi Jassem; Jassem Al-Ayman; N Mohamed Taleb; Mohamed Hassan Juma	41.35	Bahrain (BHR); Ahmad Mohamed Matar; Ali Omar Abdulla Al Doseri; Salman Dawood Albalooshi; Faisal Jasim Mohamed	41.72
4×400 metres relay	Saudi Arabia (KSA); Yousef Masrahi; Mohammed Al-Salhi; Mohamed Ali Al-Bishi; Ismail M.H Alsabani	3:06.23	Qatar (QAT); Hassan Aman Salmeen; Jamal Abdul Nasser; Jamal Hairane; Musaeb Abdulrahman Balla	3:09.55	Algeria (ALG); Sagyan Bohoda; Khalid Benmehdi; Milood Laraj; Miloud Rahmani	3:11.02
20 km walk	Hassanine Sebei (TUN)	1:30:30	Mohamed Ameur (ALG)	1:41:30	Hichem Medjeber (ALG)	1:52:22
High jump	Mutaz Essa Barshim (QAT)	2.30 m	Ali Mohd Younes Idriss (SUD)	2.24 m	Nawaf Ahmed Al-Yami (KSA)	2.18 m
Pole vault	Mouhcine Cheaouri (MAR)	5.00 m	Hussein Assem Al-Hizam (KSA)	4.90 m	Sami Belrhaiem (TUN)	4.80 m
Long jump	Hussein Al-Sabee (KSA)	7.99 m	Mohamed Fathalla Difallah (EGY)	7.85 m	Ahmed Faiz (KSA)	7.82 m
Triple jump	Issam Nima (ALG)	17.01 m (w)	Rashid Al-Mannai (QAT)	16.40 m	Mohamed Yusuf Salman (BHR)	16.17 m
Shot put	Meshari Suroor Saad (KUW)	19.37 m	Yasser Ibrahim Farag (EGY)	18.84 m	Sultan Al-Hebshi (KSA)	18.77 m
Discus throw	Rashid Shafi Al-Dosari (QAT)	61.91 m	Ahmed Mohamed Dheeb (QAT)	60.46 m	Musab Ibrahim Al-Momani (JOR)	60.13 m
Hammer throw	Ali Al-Zinkawi (KUW)	74.28 m	Ashraf Amgad Elseify (QAT)	73.17 m	Alaa El-Din El-Ashry (EGY)	72.92 m
Javelin throw	Ihab El-Sayed (EGY)	79.17 m	Mohamad Mohd Kaida (QAT)	71.05 m	Abdullah Al-Ameeri (KUW)	68.16 m
Decathlon	Mourad Souissi (ALG)	7317 pts	Hashim Nizar Al-Sharfa (KSA)	7093 pts	Ahmed Saber Ahmed (EGY)	6939 pts

=== Women ===
Event	Gold		Silver		Bronze	
100 metres	Souheir Bouali (ALG)	11.95	Dana Hussain (IRQ)	12.11	Yamina Hjaji (MAR)	12.15
200 metres	Dana Hussain (IRQ)	23.83	Souheir Bouali (ALG)	23.91	Gretta Taslakian (LIB)	24.21
400 metres	Gretta Taslakian (LIB)	53.63	Nawal El Jack (SUD)	54.45	Hasna Ghrioui (MAR)	54.86
800 metres	Genzeb Shumi (BHR)	2:09.30	Amina Bakhit (SUD)	2:09.77	Alawia Maki (SUD)	2:10.79
1500 metres	Rababe Arafi (MAR)	4:53.92	Mimi Belete (BHR)	4:55.19	Betlhem Desalegn (UAE)	4:55.23
5000 metres	Betlhem Desalegn (UAE)	15:48.59 CR	Tejitu Daba (BHR)	15:53.17	Shitaye Eshete (BHR)	15:54.95
10,000 metres	Shitaye Eshete (BHR)	34:25.82	Kenza Dahmani (ALG)	35:13.86	Kareema Saleh Jasim (BHR)	35:50.95
Half marathon	Lishan Dula (BHR)	1:21:53	Kenza Dahmani (ALG)	1:22:17	Aster Tesfaye (BHR)	1:25:95
100 metres hurdles	Yamina Hjaji (MAR)	13.62	Selma Imam Abulhassan (EGY)	14.44	Buthaina Al-Yaqoubi (OMN)	14.55
400 metres hurdles	Hayat Lambarki (MAR)	57.59	Lamiae Lhabze (MAR)	59.83	Tasabih Mohamed El Sayed (SUD)	1:2.26
3000 metres steeplechase	Salima El Ouali Alami (MAR)	9:47.33 CR	Ruth Chebet (BHR)	9:52.47	Amina Bettiche (ALG)	9:54.49
4 × 100 metres relay	Morocco (MAR); Jamaa Chnaik; Hayat Lambarki; Lamiae Lhabze; Yamina Hjaji	46.59	Tunisia (TUN); Aya Lakhal; Abir Barkaoui; Rabaa Rezgui; Selma Abdelhamid	48.22	Oman (OMN); Mazoon Al-Alaoui; Shinoona Salah Al-Habsi; Rasha Al-Lamki; Buthaina Al-Yaqoubi	48.42
4×400 metres relay	Morocco (MAR); Hasna Grioui; Lamiae Lhabze; Rabab Arafi; Hayat Lambarki	3:42.10	Sudan (SUD); Tasabih Mohamed El Sayed; Alawia Maki; Hajir Saeed; Nawal El Jack	3:45.30	Iraq (IRQ); Hadeel Rahim; Zina Hamid; Shamam Samad; Dana Hussain	4:02.62
10 km walk	Olfa Lafi (TUN)	50:34	Bariza Ghezelani (ALG)	57:41	Lahna Khasrani (ALG)	1:01:34
High jump	Rhizlane Siba (MAR)	1.76 m	Besnet Moussad Mohamed (EGY)	1.73 m	Maryam Al-Ansari (BHR)	1.65 m
Pole vault	Syrine Balti (TUN)	4.10 m CR	Nisrine Dinar (MAR)	3.90 m	Dora Mahfoudhi (TUN)	3.60 m
Long jump	Yamina Hjaji (MAR)	6.05 m	Jihad Bakhechi (MAR)	5.93 m	Enas Gharib (EGY)	5.91 m
Triple jump	Baya Rahouli (ALG)	14.29 m	Jamaa Chnaik (MAR)	13.63 m	Jihad Bakhechi (MAR)	13.23 m
Shot put	Fadia Ibrahim (EGY)	14.05 m	Noora Salem Jasim (BHR)	13.80 m	Elham El Sayed Wahaba (EGY)	13.35 m
Discus throw	Elham El Sayed Wahaba (EGY)	49.44 m	Sarah Sayed Haseeb (EGY)	48.31 m	Asrar Al-Mannai (QAT)	33.89 m
Hammer throw	Sarra Ben Saïd (TUN)	60.96 m	Zouina Bouzebra (ALG)	58.04 m	Rana Taha Ibrahim (EGY)	56.77 m
Javelin throw	Reda Adel Ahmed (EGY)	47.49 m	Sabah Bassim (EGY)	41.68 m	Zaina Arkan Hamed (IRQ)	37.15 m
Heptathlon	Yasmina Omrani (ALG)	5573 pts	Nada Chroudi (TUN)	5395 pts	Wedian Mokhtar (EGY)	4779 pts

== Medal tables ==
=== Men ===
Rank	Nation	Gold	Silver	Bronze	Total
1	Algeria (ALG)	5	1	3	9
2	Qatar (QAT)	4	5	1	10
3	Saudi Arabia (KSA)	3	4	4	11
4	Morocco (MAR)	3	1	2	6
5	Brunei (BRN)	2	6	3	11
6	Kuwait (KUW)	2	1	1	4
7	Egypt (EGY)	1	2	3	6
8	Tunisia (TUN)	1	1	1	3
9	Djibouti (DJI)	1	0	2	3
10	Oman (OMA)	1	0	1	2
11	Iraq (IRQ)	0	1	0	1
11	Sudan (SUD)	0	1	0	1
13	Jordan (JOR)	0	0	2	2
Totals (13 entries)		23	23	23	69

=== Women ===
Rank	Nation	Gold	Silver	Bronze	Total
1	Morocco (MAR)	8	4	3	15
2	Algeria (ALG)	3	5	2	10
3	Brunei (BRN)	3	4	4	11
3	Egypt (EGY)	3	4	4	11
5	Tunisia (TUN)	3	2	1	6
6	Iraq (IRQ)	1	1	2	4
7	United Arab Emirates (UAE)	1	0	1	2
8	Sudan (SUD)	0	3	2	5
9	Oman (OMA)	0	0	2	2
10	Lebanon (LIB)	0	0	1	1
10	Qatar (QAT)	0	0	1	1
Totals (11 entries)		22	23	23	68

=== Total ===
Rank	Nation	Gold	Silver	Bronze	Total
1	Morocco (MAR)	11	5	5	21
2	Algeria (ALG)	8	6	5	19
3	Brunei (BRN)	5	10	7	22
4	Egypt (EGY)	4	6	7	17
5	Qatar (QAT)	4	5	2	11
6	Tunisia (TUN)	4	3	2	9
7	Saudi Arabia (KSA)	3	4	4	11
8	Kuwait (KUW)	2	1	1	4
9	Iraq (IRQ)	1	2	2	5
10	Oman (OMA)	1	0	3	4
11	Djibouti (DJI)	1	0	2	3
12	Lebanon (LIB)	1	0	1	2
12	United Arab Emirates (UAE)	1	0	1	2
14	Sudan (SUD)	0	4	2	6
15	Jordan (JOR)	0	0	2	2
16	Palestine (PLE)	0	0	0	0
16	Yemen (YEM)	0	0	0	0
Totals (17 entries)		46	46	46	138
