= Athletics at the 2014 Asian Games – Men's 5000 metres =

2014 Asian athletic event

Men's 5000 metres at the 2014 Asian Games
- Venue: Incheon Asiad Main Stadium
- Dates: 27 September 2014
- Competitors: 19 from 12 nations

Medalists
gold medal	Mohamad Al-Garni	Qatar
silver medal	Alemu Bekele	Bahrain
bronze medal	Albert Rop	Bahrain

The men's 5000 metres event at the 2014 Asian Games was held at the Incheon Asiad Main Stadium, Incheon, South Korea on 27 September.

== Schedule ==
All times are Korea Standard Time (UTC+09:00)

Date	Time	Event
Saturday, 27 September 2014	21:00	Final

== Records ==
Prior to this competition, the existing world, Asian and Games records were as follows.

World Record	Kenenisa Bekele (ETH)	12:37.35	Hengelo, Netherlands	31 May 2004
Asian Record	Albert Rop (BRN)	12:51.96	Monaco	19 July 2013
Games Record	Toshinari Takaoka (JPN)	13:38.37	Hiroshima, Japan	16 October 1994

== Results ==
Rank	Athlete	Time	Notes
1st place, gold medalist(s)	Mohamad Al-Garni (QAT)	13:26.13	GR
2nd place, silver medalist(s)	Alemu Bekele (BRN)	13:27.98	
3rd place, bronze medalist(s)	Albert Rop (BRN)	13:28.08	
4	Abubaker Ali Kamal (QAT)	13:28.59	
5	Kota Murayama (JPN)	13:34.57	
6	Yuki Sato (JPN)	13:34.97	
7	Kheta Ram (IND)	13:37.40	
8	Tariq Al-Amri (KSA)	13:38.40	
9	Suresh Kumar (IND)	13:42.28	
10	Baek Seung-ho (KOR)	14:06.76	
11	Nguyễn Văn Lai (VIE)	14:08.68	
12	Duo Bujie (CHN)	14:13.74	
13	Kim Min (KOR)	14:20.24	
14	Hari Kumar Rimal (NEP)	14:57.58	
15	Gopi Chandra Parki (NEP)	14:57.75	
16	Narandulamyn Mönkhbayar (MGL)	14:58.88	
17	Batbayaryn Dorjpalam (MGL)	15:26.66	
18	Fawaz Meshaal (KUW)	15:57.43	
19	Ma Viro (CAM)	16:00.31	
