= 2015 Asian Athletics Championships – Women's 5000 metres =

The women's 5000 metres event at the 2015 Asian Athletics Championships was held on the 4 of June.

== Results ==
Rank	Name	Nationality	Result	Notes
~~1~~	Betlhem Desalegn	United Arab Emirates	~~15:25.15~~	DQ
1st place, gold medalist(s)	Alia Saeed Mohammed	United Arab Emirates	15:28.74	
2nd place, silver medalist(s)	Daria Maslova	Kyrgyzstan	15:42.82	PB
3rd place, bronze medalist(s)	Mao Kiyota	Japan	15:49.99	
4	Risa Kikuchi	Japan	16:04.39	
5	Li Zhixuan	China	16:07.05	
6	Xu Qiuzi	China	16:16.66	
7	Marina Khmelevskaya	Uzbekistan	16:43.20	
8	Heng Mey Jou	Cambodia	20:42.99	NR
	Mimi Belete	Bahrain	DNS	
