= Athletics at the 2014 Asian Games – Men's 10,000 metres =

Men's 10,000 metres at the 2014 Asian Games
- Venue: Incheon Asiad Main Stadium
- Dates: 2 October 2014
- Competitors: 13 from 7 nations

Medalists
gold medal	El-Hassan El-Abbassi	Bahrain
silver medal	Suguru Osako	Japan
bronze medal	Isaac Korir	Bahrain

The men's 10,000 metres event at the 2014 Asian Games was held at the Incheon Asiad Main Stadium, Incheon, South Korea on 2 October 2014.

== Schedule ==
All times are Korea Standard Time (UTC+09:00)

Date	Time	Event
Thursday, 2 October 2014	21:15	Final

== Records ==
Prior to this competition, the existing world, Asian and Games records were as follows.

World Record	Kenenisa Bekele (ETH)	26:17.53	Brussels, Belgium	26 August 2005
Asian Record	Ahmad Hassan Abdullah (QAT)	26:38.76	Brussels, Belgium	5 September 2003
Games Record	Bilisuma Shugi (BRN)	27:32.72	Guangzhou, China	26 November 2010

== Results ==
Legend

- DNS — Did not start

Rank	Athlete	Time	Notes
1st place, gold medalist(s)	El-Hassan El-Abbassi (BRN)	28:11.20	
2nd place, silver medalist(s)	Suguru Osako (JPN)	28:11.94	
3rd place, bronze medalist(s)	Isaac Korir (BRN)	28:45.65	
4	Rahul Kumar Pal (IND)	28:52.36	
5	Suresh Kumar (IND)	28:58.22	
6	Baek Seung-ho (KOR)	29:33.15	
7	Kim Min (KOR)	29:38.77	
8	Tariq Al-Amri (KSA)	29:39.22	
9	Gopi Chandra Parki (NEP)	30:30.99	
10	Tseveenravdangiin Byambajav (MGL)	30:47.46	
11	Batbayaryn Dorjpalam (MGL)	31:48.01	
—	Ali Al-Amri (KSA)	DNS	
—	Yuki Sato (JPN)	DNS	
