= Athletics at the 2014 Asian Games =

- Venue: Incheon Asiad Main Stadium
- Dates: 27 September – 3 October 2014
- Competitors: 654 from 41 nations

Athletics at the 2014 Asian Games was held in Incheon, South Korea from 27 September to 3 October 2014. A total of 47 events were contested, 24 by men and 23 by women - matching the Olympic athletics programme. The 42 track and field events on the programme were hosted at the Incheon Asiad Main Stadium, while the road competitions took place around the city's marathon and racewalking course.

== Schedule ==
●	1st day	●	Final day	H	Heats	S	Semifinals	F	Final

Event↓/Date →	27th Sat		28th Sun		29th Mon	30th Tue	1st Wed		2nd Thu	3rd Fri
Men's 100 m	H		S	F						
Men's 200 m						H	S	F		
Men's 400 m	H	S	F							
Men's 800 m						H	F			
Men's 1500 m			H		F					
Men's 5000 m	F									
Men's 10,000 m									F	
Men's 110 m hurdles			H			F				
Men's 400 m hurdles						H	F			
Men's 3000 m steeplechase					F					
Men's 4 × 100 m relay					H				F	
Men's 4 × 400 m relay					H				F	
Men's marathon										F
Men's 20 km walk			F							
Men's 50 km walk							F			
Men's high jump					F					
Men's pole vault			F							
Men's long jump						F				
Men's triple jump									F	
Men's shot put									F	
Men's discus throw						F				
Men's hammer throw	F									
Men's javelin throw									F	
Men's decathlon						●	●			
Women's 100 m	H		F							
Women's 200 m						H	F			
Women's 400 m	H		F							
Women's 800 m						H	F			
Women's 1500 m					F					
Women's 5000 m									F	
Women's 10,000 m	F									
Women's 100 m hurdles						H	F			
Women's 400 m hurdles						H	F			
Women's 3000 m steeplechase	F									
Women's 4 × 100 m relay									F	
Women's 4 × 400 m relay									F	
Women's marathon									F	
Women's 20 km walk			F							
Women's high jump									F	
Women's pole vault						F				
Women's long jump					F					
Women's triple jump							F			
Women's shot put	F									
Women's discus throw					F					
Women's hammer throw			F							
Women's javelin throw							F			
Women's heptathlon			●		●					

== Medalists ==
=== Men ===
Event	Gold		Silver		Bronze	
100 m	Femi Ogunode; Qatar	9.93; AR	Su Bingtian; China	10.10	Kei Takase; Japan	10.15
200 m	Femi Ogunode; Qatar	20.14; GR	Fahhad Al-Subaie; Saudi Arabia	20.74	Yeo Ho-sua; South Korea	20.82
400 m	Yousef Masrahi; Saudi Arabia	44.46; GR	Abbas Abubakar Abbas; Bahrain	45.62	Arokia Rajiv; India	45.92
800 m	Adnan Taess; Iraq	1:47.48	Teng Haining; China	1:47.81	Jamal Hairane; Qatar	1:48.25
1500 m	Mohamad Al-Garni; Qatar	3:40.23	Rashid Ramzi; Bahrain	3:40.95	Adnan Taess; Iraq	3:42.50
5000 m	Mohamad Al-Garni; Qatar	13.26.13; GR	Alemu Bekele; Bahrain	13.27.98	Albert Rop; Bahrain	13.28.08
10,000 m	El-Hassan El-Abbassi; Bahrain	28:11.20	Suguru Osako; Japan	28:11.94	Isaac Korir; Bahrain	28:45.65
110 m hurdles	Xie Wenjun; China	13.36	Kim Byoung-jun; South Korea	13.43	Jamras Rittidet; Thailand	13.61
400 m hurdles	Ali Khamis; Bahrain	49.71	Takayuki Kishimoto; Japan	49.81	Cheng Wen; China	50.29
3000 m steeplechase	Abubaker Ali Kamal; Qatar	8:28.72	Tareq Mubarak Taher; Bahrain	8:39.62	Naveen Kumar; India	8:40.39
4 × 100 m relay	China; Chen Shiwei; Xie Zhenye; Su Bingtian; Zhang Peimeng; Yang Yang; Mo Youxue	37.99; AR	Japan; Ryota Yamagata; Shota Iizuka; Shinji Takahira; Kei Takase; Shota Hara	38.49	Hong Kong; Tang Yik Chun; So Chun Hong; Ng Ka Fung; Tsui Chi Ho; Lai Chun Ho	38.98
4 × 400 m relay	Japan; Yuzo Kanemaru; Kenji Fujimitsu; Shota Iizuka; Nobuya Kato; Shinji Takahira	3:01.88	South Korea; Park Se-jung; Park Bong-go; Seong Hyeok-je; Yeo Ho-sua; Choi Dong-baek	3:04.03	Saudi Arabia; Ismail Al-Sabiani; Ahmed Al-Khayri; Mohammed Al-Bishi; Yousef Masrahi	3:04.03
Marathon	Hasan Mahboob; Bahrain	2:12:38	Kohei Matsumura; Japan	2:12:39	Yuki Kawauchi; Japan	2:12:42
20 km walk	Wang Zhen; China	1:19:45; GR	Yusuke Suzuki; Japan	1:20:44	Kim Hyun-sub; South Korea	1:21:37
50 km walk	Takayuki Tanii; Japan	3:40:19; GR	Park Chil-sung; South Korea	3:49:15	Wang Zhendong; China	3:50:52
High jump	Mutaz Barsham; Qatar	2.35; GR	Zhang Guowei; China	2.33	Muamer Barsham; Qatar	2.25
Pole vault	Xue Changrui; China	5.55	Daichi Sawano; Japan	5.55	Jin Min-sub; South Korea	5.45
Long jump	Li Jinzhe; China	8.01	Kim Deok-hyeon; South Korea	7.90	Gao Xinglong; China	7.86
Triple jump	Cao Shuo; China	17.30	Dong Bin; China	16.95	Kim Deok-hyeon; South Korea	16.93
Shot put	Sultan Al-Hebshi; Saudi Arabia	19.99	Chang Ming-huang; Chinese Taipei	19.97	Inderjeet Singh; India	19.63
Discus throw	Ehsan Haddadi; Iran	65.11	Vikas Gowda; India	62.58	Ahmed Dheeb; Qatar	61.25
Hammer throw	Dilshod Nazarov; Tajikistan	76.82	Wang Shizhu; China	73.65	Wan Yong; China	73.43
Javelin throw	Zhao Qinggang; China	89.15; AR	Ryohei Arai; Japan	84.82	Ivan Zaytsev; Uzbekistan	83.68
Decathlon	Keisuke Ushiro; Japan	8088	Leonid Andreev; Uzbekistan	7879	Akihiko Nakamura; Japan	7828

=== Women ===
Event	Gold		Silver		Bronze	
100 m	Wei Yongli; China	11.48	Chisato Fukushima; Japan	11.49	Olga Safronova; Kazakhstan	11.50
200 m	Olga Safronova; Kazakhstan	23.02	Wei Yongli; China	23.27	Chisato Fukushima; Japan	23.45
400 m	Kemi Adekoya; Bahrain	51.59	Quách Thị Lan; Vietnam	52.06	M. R. Poovamma; India	52.36
800 m	Margarita Mukasheva; Kazakhstan	1:59.02; GR	Tintu Luka; India	1:59.19	Zhao Jing; China	1:59.48
1500 m	Maryam Yusuf Jamal; Bahrain	4:09.90	Mimi Belete; Bahrain	4:11.03	O. P. Jaisha; India	4:13.46
5000 m	Maryam Yusuf Jamal; Bahrain	14:59.69	Mimi Belete; Bahrain	15:00.87	Ding Changqin; China	15:12.51
10,000 m	Alia Saeed Mohammed; United Arab Emirates	31:51.86	Ding Changqin; China	31:53.09	Ayumi Hagiwara; Japan	31:55.67
100 m hurdles	Wu Shuijiao; China	12.72	Sun Yawei; China	13.05	Ayako Kimura; Japan	13.25
400 m hurdles	Kemi Adekoya; Bahrain	55.77	Satomi Kubokura; Japan	56.21	Xiao Xia; China	56.59
3000 m steeplechase	Ruth Jebet; Bahrain	9:31.36; GR	Li Zhenzhu; China	9:35.23	Lalita Babar; India	9:35.37
4 × 100 m relay	China; Tao Yujia; Kong Lingwei; Lin Huijun; Wei Yongli	42.83; GR	Kazakhstan; Svetlana Ivanchukova; Viktoriya Zyabkina; Anastassiya Tulapina; Olga Safronova	43.90	Japan; Anna Fujimori; Kana Ichikawa; Masumi Aoki; Chisato Fukushima	44.05
4 × 400 m relay	India; Priyanka Pawar; Tintu Luka; Mandeep Kaur; M. R. Poovamma	3:28.68; GR	Japan; Seika Aoyama; Nanako Matsumoto; Kana Ichikawa; Asami Chiba	3:30.80	China; Li Manyuan; Wang Huan; Chen Jingwen; Cheng Chong	3:32.02
Marathon	Eunice Kirwa; Bahrain	2:25:37	Ryoko Kizaki; Japan	2:25:50	Lishan Dula; Bahrain	2:33:13
20 km walk	Lü Xiuzhi; China	1:31:06	Khushbir Kaur; India	1:33:07	Jeon Yeong-eun; South Korea	1:33:18
High jump	Svetlana Radzivil; Uzbekistan	1.94	Zheng Xingjuan; China	1.92	Nadiya Dusanova; Uzbekistan	1.89
Pole vault	Li Ling; China	4.35 =GR	Tomomi Abiko; Japan	4.25	Lim Eun-ji; South Korea	4.15
Long jump	Maria Natalia Londa; Indonesia	6.55	Bùi Thị Thu Thảo; Vietnam	6.44	Jiang Yanfei; China	6.34
Triple jump	Olga Rypakova; Kazakhstan	14.32	Aleksandra Kotlyarova; Uzbekistan	14.05	Irina Ektova; Kazakhstan	13.77
Shot put	Gong Lijiao; China	19.06	Leila Rajabi; Iran	17.80	Guo Tianqian; China	17.52
Discus throw	Seema Punia; India	61.03	Lu Xiaoxin; China	59.35	Tan Jian; China	59.03
Hammer throw	Zhang Wenxiu; China	77.33; GR	Wang Zheng; China	74.16	Manju Bala; India	60.47
Javelin throw	Zhang Li; China	65.47; GR	Li Lingwei; China	61.43	Annu Rani; India	59.53
Heptathlon	Ekaterina Voronina; Uzbekistan	5912	Wang Qingling; China	5856	Yuliya Tarasova; Uzbekistan	5482

== Medal table ==
Rank	Nation	Gold	Silver	Bronze	Total
1	China (CHN)	15	14	11	40
2	Bahrain (BRN)	9	6	3	18
3	Qatar (QAT)	6	0	3	9
4	Japan (JPN)	3	12	7	22
5	Kazakhstan (KAZ)	3	1	2	6
6	India (IND)	2	3	8	13
7	Uzbekistan (UZB)	2	2	3	7
8	Saudi Arabia (KSA)	2	1	1	4
9	Iran (IRI)	1	1	0	2
10	Iraq (IRQ)	1	0	1	2
11	Indonesia (INA)	1	0	0	1
11	Tajikistan (TJK)	1	0	0	1
11	United Arab Emirates (UAE)	1	0	0	1
14	South Korea (KOR)	0	4	6	10
15	Vietnam (VIE)	0	2	0	2
16	Chinese Taipei (TPE)	0	1	0	1
17	Hong Kong (HKG)	0	0	1	1
17	Thailand (THA)	0	0	1	1
Totals (18 entries)		47	47	47	141

== Participating nations ==
A total of 654 athletes from 41 nations competed in athletics at the 2014 Asian Games:

- Afghanistan (2)
- Bahrain (28)
- Bhutan (1)
- Cambodia (3)
- China (79)
- Chinese Taipei (27)
- Hong Kong (18)
- India (47)
- Indonesia (3)
- Iran (20)
- Iraq (11)
- Japan (52)
- Kazakhstan (29)
- Kuwait (20)
- Kyrgyzstan (8)
- Laos (4)
- Lebanon (1)
- Macau (8)
- Malaysia (6)
- Maldives (5)
- Mongolia (13)
- Myanmar (3)
- Nepal (10)
- North Korea (4)
- Oman (10)
- Palestine (3)
- Philippines (9)
- Qatar (25)
- Saudi Arabia (19)
- Singapore (11)
- South Korea (65)
- Sri Lanka (11)
- Syria (3)
- Tajikistan (5)
- Thailand (37)
- Timor-Leste (2)
- Turkmenistan (4)
- United Arab Emirates (4)
- Uzbekistan (27)
- Vietnam (13)
- Yemen (4)
