= Athletics at the 2014 Asian Games – Men's 400 metres hurdles =

Men's 400 metres hurdles at the 2014 Asian Games
- Venue: Incheon Asiad Main Stadium
- Dates: 30 September – 1 October 2014
- Competitors: 17 from 13 nations

Medalists
| gold medal | Ali Khamis | Bahrain |
| silver medal | Takayuki Kishimoto | Japan |
| bronze medal | Cheng Wen | China |

The men's 400 metres hurdles event at the 2014 Asian Games was held at the Incheon Asiad Main Stadium, Incheon, South Korea on 30 September – 1 October.

== Schedule ==
All times are Korea Standard Time (UTC+09:00)

| Date | Time | Event |
|---|---|---|
| Tuesday, 30 September 2014 | 10:55 | Round 1 |
| Wednesday, 1 October 2014 | 20:50 | Final |

== Records ==
Prior to this competition, the existing world, Asian and Games records were as follows.

| World Record | Kevin Young (USA) | 46.78 | Barcelona, Spain | 6 August 1992 |
| Asian Record | Hadi Soua'an Al-Somaily (KSA) | 47.53 | Sydney, Australia | 27 September 2000 |
| Games Record | Hadi Soua'an Al-Somaily (KSA) | 48.42 | Busan, South Korea | 8 October 2002 |

== Results ==
Legend

- DSQ — Disqualified

=== Round 1 ===
- Qualification: First 2 in each heat (Q) and the next 2 fastest (q) advance to the final.

==== Heat 1 ====
| Rank | Athlete | Time | Notes |
|---|---|---|---|
| 1 | Chen Chieh (TPE) | 50.11 | Q |
| 2 | Ali Khamis (BRN) | 50.22 | Q |
| 3 | Joseph Abraham (IND) | 51.04 | |
| 4 | Chen Ke (CHN) | 51.15 | |
| 5 | Mustafa Ammar (IRQ) | 51.77 | |
| 6 | Ali Hazer (LIB) | 54.66 | |

==== Heat 2 ====
| Rank | Athlete | Time | Notes |
|---|---|---|---|
| 1 | Yu Chia-hsuan (TPE) | 51.63 | Q |
| 2 | Jithin Paul (IND) | 51.76 | Q |
| 3 | Dmitriy Koblov (KAZ) | 52.01 | |
| 4 | Yousef Karam (KUW) | 52.15 | |
| 5 | Chan Ka Chun (HKG) | 52.65 | |

==== Heat 3 ====
| Rank | Athlete | Time | Notes |
|---|---|---|---|
| 1 | Cheng Wen (CHN) | 49.89 | Q |
| 2 | Eric Cray (PHI) | 50.00 | Q |
| 3 | Takayuki Kishimoto (JPN) | 50.27 | q |
| 4 | Jasem Al-Mas (KUW) | 50.50 | q |
| 5 | Lee Seung-yoon (KOR) | 51.19 | |
| 6 | Artem Dyatlov (UZB) | 51.70 | |

=== Final ===
| Rank | Athlete | Time | Notes |
|---|---|---|---|
| 1st place, gold medalist(s) | Ali Khamis (BRN) | 49.71 | |
| 2nd place, silver medalist(s) | Takayuki Kishimoto (JPN) | 49.81 | |
| 3rd place, bronze medalist(s) | Cheng Wen (CHN) | 50.29 | |
| 4 | Jasem Al-Mas (KUW) | 50.80 | |
| 5 | Chen Chieh (TPE) | 51.10 | |
| 6 | Eric Cray (PHI) | 51.47 | |
| 7 | Yu Chia-hsuan (TPE) | 51.84 | |
| — | Jithin Paul (IND) | DSQ | |
