= Athletics at the 2014 Asian Games – Women's 1500 metres =

Women's 1500 metres at the 2014 Asian Games
- Venue: Incheon Asiad Main Stadium
- Dates: 29 September 2014
- Competitors: 16 from 11 nations

Medalists
gold medal	Maryam Yusuf Jamal	Bahrain
silver medal	Mimi Belete	Bahrain
bronze medal	O. P. Jaisha	India

The women's 1500 metres event at the 2014 Asian Games was held at the Incheon Asiad Main Stadium, Incheon, South Korea on 29 September.

== Schedule ==
All times are Korea Standard Time (UTC+09:00)

Date	Time	Event
Monday, 29 September 2014	19:05	Final

== Records ==
Prior to this competition, the existing world, Asian and Games records were as follows.

World Record	Qu Yunxia (CHN)	3:50.46	Beijing, China	11 September 1993
Asian Record	Qu Yunxia (CHN)	3:50.46	Beijing, China	11 September 1993
Games Record	Sunita Rani (IND)	4:06.03	Busan, South Korea	10 October 2002

== Results ==
Rank	Athlete	Time	Notes
1st place, gold medalist(s)	Maryam Yusuf Jamal (BRN)	4:09.90	
2nd place, silver medalist(s)	Mimi Belete (BRN)	4:11.03	
3rd place, bronze medalist(s)	O. P. Jaisha (IND)	4:13.46	
4	Sinimole Paulose (IND)	4:17.12	
5	Liu Fang (CHN)	4:19.98	
6	Irina Moroz (UZB)	4:22.85	
7	Gulshanoi Satarova (KGZ)	4:24.16	
8	Oh Dal-nim (KOR)	4:25.47	
9	Choe Bo-woon (KOR)	4:28.45	
10	Viktoriia Poliudina (KGZ)	4:32.07	
11	Zhang Meixia (CHN)	4:32.36	
12	Phyu War Thet (MYA)	4:32.84	
13	Chuluunkhüügiin Shinetsetseg (MGL)	4:34.87	
14	Mariquita dos Santos (TLS)	5:07.69	
15	Malayin Al-Shalabi (YEM)	5:30.50	
DQ	Betlhem Desalegn (UAE)	~~4:16.88~~	

- Betlhem Desalegn of the United Arab Emirates originally got the 4th place, but was disqualified because of her biological passport abnormalities.
