= Athletics at the 2014 Asian Games – Women's 5000 metres =

Women's 5000 metres at the 2014 Asian Games
- Venue: Incheon Asiad Main Stadium
- Dates: 2 October 2014
- Competitors: 17 from 11 nations

Medalists
gold medal	Maryam Yusuf Jamal	Bahrain
silver medal	Mimi Belete	Bahrain
bronze medal	Ding Changqin	China

The women's 5000 metres event at the 2014 Asian Games was held at the Incheon Asiad Main Stadium, Incheon, South Korea on 2 October.

== Schedule ==
All times are Korea Standard Time (UTC+09:00)

Date	Time	Event
Thursday, 2 October 2014	19:00	Final

== Records ==
Prior to this competition, the existing world, Asian and Games records were as follows.

World Record	Tirunesh Dibaba (ETH)	14:11.15	Beijing, China	6 June 2008
Asian Record	Jiang Bo (CHN)	14:28.09	Shanghai, China	23 October 1997
Games Record	Sun Yingjie (CHN)	14:40.41	Busan, South Korea	12 October 2002

== Results ==
Rank	Athlete	Time	Notes
1st place, gold medalist(s)	Maryam Yusuf Jamal (BRN)	14:59.69	
2nd place, silver medalist(s)	Mimi Belete (BRN)	15:00.87	
3rd place, bronze medalist(s)	Ding Changqin (CHN)	15:12.51	
4	O. P. Jaisha (IND)	15:18.30	
5	Riko Matsuzaki (JPN)	15:18.95	
6	Alia Saeed Mohammed (UAE)	15:30.46	
7	Misaki Onishi (JPN)	15:37.60	
8	Preeja Sreedharan (IND)	15:39.52	
9	Darya Maslova (KGZ)	15:47.17	
10	Xiao Huimin (CHN)	16:04.60	
11	Kim Do-yeon (KOR)	16:09.72	
12	Bayartsogtyn Mönkhzayaa (MGL)	16:11.10	
13	Hyun Seo-yong (KOR)	16:37.80	
14	Phyu War Thet (MYA)	16:52.56	
15	Kanchhi Maya Koju (NEP)	17:20.33	
16	Lodkeo Inthakoumman (LAO)	18:24.77	
DQ	Betlhem Desalegn (UAE)	~~15:49.60~~	

- Betlhem Desalegn of the United Arab Emirates originally got the 10th place, but was disqualified because of her biological passport abnormalities.
