= 2013 World Championships in Athletics – Women's 5000 metres =

Women's 5000 metres at the 2013 World Championships
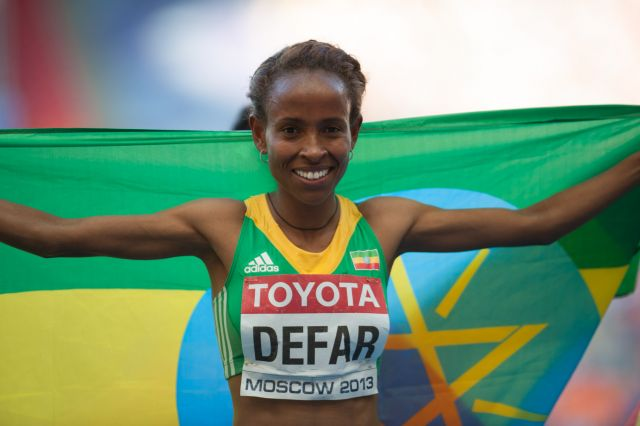
- Gold medalist Meseret Defar
- Venue: Luzhniki Stadium
- Dates: 14 August (heats); 17 August (final)
- Competitors: 22 from 16 nations
- Winning time: 14:50.19

Medalists
gold medal	Meseret Defar; Ethiopia
silver medal	Mercy Cherono; Kenya
bronze medal	Almaz Ayana; Ethiopia

Official Video

The women's 5000 metres at the 2013 World Championships in Athletics was held at the Luzhniki Stadium on 14–17 August.

With Margaret Wangari Muriuki dropping out injured in the first round, the finals had three Ethiopians (four if you count Tejitu Daba) and three Americans and only two Kenyans. Also missing by design is world record holder Tirunesh Dibaba who won the 10000 earlier, leaving Meseret Defar the 5000.

The final started slow with the Ethiopians watching the front (the reigning Olympic champion Defar watching her teammates from the back), letting Dominika Nowakowska then Dolores Checa jog through 75-second laps at the front. With 2000 to go, the racing began, Almaz Ayana took over the lead and the crowd disappeared. Within a lap, not surprisingly, the three Ethiopians and two Kenyans were running alone. Lap times were dropping, 71, 69, 68. In the next lap Buze Diriba fell back to the trailing American duo of Molly Huddle and Shannon Rowbury. The two Ethiopians were leading, the two Kenyans trying to keep up. Shortly after the bell, Viola Kibiwot lost touch with her teammate Mercy Cherono and then there were three. Defar stayed tucked into second place waiting until the time was right. The time was 200 meters to go, that was when Defar accelerated past Ayana and into the lead. Cherono made no effort to go after Defar, she was gone sprinting to gold. Cherono waited through the turn and executed her best move to outsprint Ayana for the silver. So prepared for victory, Defar and Ayana had already received their flags and were displaying them while the early leaders were still finishing.

== Records ==
Prior to the competition, the records were as follows:

World record	Tirunesh Dibaba (ETH)	14:11.15	Oslo, Norway	6 June 2008
Championship record	Tirunesh Dibaba (ETH)	14:38.59	Helsinki, Finland	13 August 2005
World Leading	Tirunesh Dibaba (ETH)	14:23.68	Paris, France	6 June 2013
African Record	Tirunesh Dibaba (ETH)	14:11.15	Oslo, Norway	6 June 2008
Asian Record	Bo Jiang (CHN)	14:28.09	Shanghai, People's Republic of China	23 October 1997
North, Central American and Caribbean record	Molly Huddle (USA)	14:44.76	Brussels, Belgium	27 August 2010
South American record	Simone da Silva (BRA)	15:18.85	São Paulo, Brazil	20 May 2011
European Record	Liliya Shobukhova (RUS)	14:23.75	Kazan, Russia	19 July 2008
Oceanian record	Kim Smith (NZL)	14:45.93	Rome, Italy	11 July 2008

== Qualification standards ==
A time	B time
15:18.00	15:24.00

== Schedule ==
Date	Time	Round
14 August 2013	9:40	Heats
17 August 2013	18:55	Final

All times are local times (UTC+4)

== Results ==
KEY:	Q	Qualified	q	Fastest non-qualifiers	NR	National record	PB	Personal best	SB	Seasonal best

=== Heats ===
Qualification: First 5 in each heat (Q) and the next 5 fastest (q) advanced to the final.

Rank	Heat	Name	Nationality	Time	Notes
1	2	Meseret Defar	Ethiopia	15:22.94	Q
2	2	Buze Diriba	Ethiopia	15:23.41	Q
3	2	Viola Kibiwot	Kenya	15:24.47	Q
4	2	Yelena Nagovitsyna	Russia	15:26.95	Q
5	2	Kim Conley	United States	15:27.35	Q
6	2	Karoline Bjerkeli Grøvdal	Norway	15:29.41	q
7	2	Susan Kuijken	Netherlands	15:34.31	q
8	1	Mercy Cherono	Kenya	15:34.70	Q
9	1	Almaz Ayana	Ethiopia	15:34.93	Q
10	2	Jackie Areson	Australia	15:40.21	q
11	1	Molly Huddle	United States	15:40.91	Q
12	2	Dolores Checa	Spain	15:43.73	q
13	2	Dominika Nowakowska	Poland	15:45.10	q
14	1	Shannon Rowbury	United States	15:50.41	Q
15	1	Tejitu Daba	Bahrain	15:56.74	Q
16	1	Almensh Belete	Belgium	16:03.03	
17	1	Sophie Duarte	France	16:05.14	
18	1	Betlhem Desalegn	United Arab Emirates	16:13.27	
19	1	Misaki Onishi	Japan	16:16.52	
20	1	Carolina Tabares	Colombia	16:22.81	
21	2	Giuli Dekanadze	Georgia	17:57.39	SB
	1	Margaret Wangari Muriuki	Kenya	DNF	

=== Final ===
The final was started at 18:55.

Rank	Name	Nationality	Time	Notes
1st place, gold medalist(s)	Meseret Defar	Ethiopia	14:50.19	
2nd place, silver medalist(s)	Mercy Cherono	Kenya	14:51.22	
3rd place, bronze medalist(s)	Almaz Ayana	Ethiopia	14:51.33	
4	Viola Kibiwot	Kenya	15:01.67	
5	Buze Diriba	Ethiopia	15:05.38	
6	Molly Huddle	United States	15:05.73	
7	Shannon Rowbury	United States	15:06.10	SB
8	Susan Kuijken	Netherlands	15:14.70	
9	Elena Nagovitsyna	Russia	15:24.83	
10	Dolores Checa	Spain	15:30.42	
11	Tejitu Daba	Bahrain	15:33.89	
12	Kim Conley	United States	15:36.58	
13	Karoline Bjerkeli Grøvdal	Norway	15:48.87	
14	Dominika Nowakowska	Poland	15:58.26	
15	Jackie Areson	Australia	16:08.32	
