= Misaki Onishi =

Japanese long-distance runner

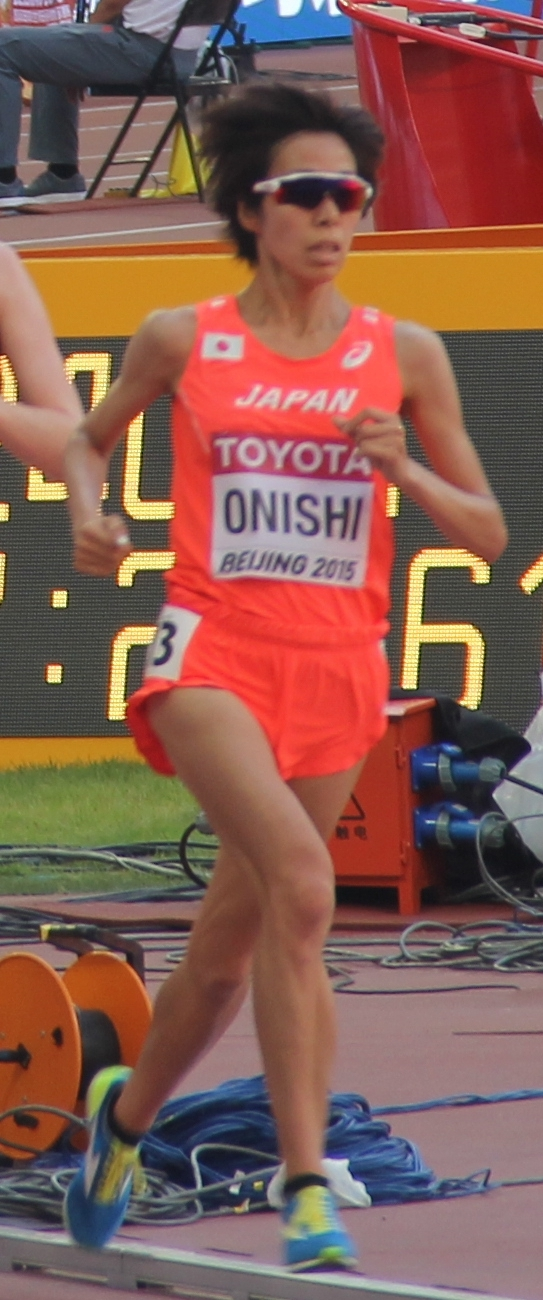
- Misaki Onishi in 2015

Personal information
- Born: 24 February 1985 (age 41) Ise, Mie Prefecture, Japan
- Height: 1.64 m (5 ft 5 in)
- Weight: 45 kg (99 lb)

Sport
- Sport: Track and field
- Event: 5000 metres

Misaki Onishi (尾西 美咲, Onishi Misaki; born 24 February 1985) is a Japanese long-distance runner competing primarily in the 5000 metres. She represented her country at the 2013 and 2015 World Championships in Athletics reaching the final on the second occasion.

== International competitions ==
Year	Competition	Venue	Position	Event	Notes
Representing Japan
2013	World Championships	Moscow, Russia	19th (h)	5000 m	16:16.52
2014	Asian Games	Incheon, South Korea	7th	5000 m	15:37.60
2015	World Championships	Beijing, China	14th	5000 m	15:29.63
2016	Olympic Games	Rio de Janeiro, Brazil	18th (h)	5000 m	15:29.17

== Personal bests ==
Outdoor

- 1500 metres – 4:17.78 (Oita 2006)
- 3000 metres – 9:05.45 (Kitami 2014)
- 5000 metres – 15:16.82 (Palo Alto 2015)
- 20 kilometres – 1:07:35 (Marugame 2013)
- Half marathon – 1:11:16 (Marugame 2013)
