= United Arab Emirates at the 2015 World Championships in Athletics =

- WA code: UAE

in Beijing
- Competitors: 2
- Medals: Gold 0 Silver 0 Bronze 0 Total 0

World Championships in Athletics appearances (overview)
- 1983; 1987; 1991; 1993; 1995; 1997; 1999; 2001; 2003–2007; 2009; 2011; 2013; 2015; 2017; 2019–2022; 2023; 2025

United Arab Emirates competed at the 2015 World Championships in Athletics in Beijing, China, from 22–30 August 2015.

== Results ==
(q – qualified, NM – no mark, SB – season best)

=== Women ===
Track and road events

Athlete	Event	Heat		Semifinal		Final	
Athlete	Event	Result	Rank	Result	Rank	Result	Rank
Betlhem Desalegn	1500 metres	4:05.73	5 Q	4:17.92	10	Did not advance	
Betlhem Desalegn	5000 metres	15:48.52	8	Did not advance		Did not advance	
Alia Saeed Mohammed	10,000 metres	—N/a				DNF	–
