= Athletics at the 2014 Asian Games – Men's 400 metres =

Men's 400 metres at the 2014 Asian Games
- Venue: Incheon Asiad Main Stadium
- Dates: 27–28 September 2014
- Competitors: 31 from 19 nations

Medalists
gold medal	Yousef Masrahi	Saudi Arabia
silver medal	Abbas Abubakar Abbas	Bahrain
bronze medal	Arokia Rajiv	India

The men's 400 metres event at the 2014 Asian Games was held at the Incheon Asiad Main Stadium, Incheon, South Korea on 27–28 September.

== Schedule ==
All times are Korea Standard Time (UTC+09:00)

Date	Time	Event
Saturday, 27 September 2014	18:00	Round 1
Saturday, 27 September 2014	21:40	Semifinals
Sunday, 28 September 2014	19:30	Final

== Records ==
Prior to this competition, the existing world, Asian and Games records were as follows.

World Record	Michael Johnson (USA)	43.18	Seville, Spain	26 August 1999
Asian Record	Yousef Masrahi (KSA)	44.43	Lausanne, Switzerland	3 July 2014
Games Record	Ibrahim Ismail Muftah (QAT); Fawzi Al-Shammari (KUW)	44.93	Hiroshima, Japan; Busan, South Korea	11 October 1994; 9 October 2002

== Results ==
Legend

- DNS — Did not start

=== Round 1 ===
- Qualification: First 3 in each heat (Q) and the next 4 fastest (q) advance to the semifinals.

==== Heat 1 ====
Rank	Athlete	Time	Notes
1	Yuzo Kanemaru (JPN)	46.68	Q
2	Ismail Al-Sabiani (KSA)	46.83	Q
3	Maytham Hussein (IRQ)	47.10	Q
4	Sergey Zaikov (KAZ)	47.28	q
5	Mohamed Nasir Abbas (QAT)	47.64	
6	Vitsanu Phosri (THA)	47.67	
7	Leung King Hung (HKG)	48.12	
8	Samuel dos Santos (TLS)	53.78	

==== Heat 2 ====
Rank	Athlete	Time	Notes
1	Abbas Abubakar Abbas (BRN)	45.61	Q
2	Park Bong-go (KOR)	46.15	Q
3	Zhu Chenbin (CHN)	46.50	Q
4	Archand Bagsit (PHI)	46.88	q
5	Saud Abdelkarim (UAE)	47.20	q
6	Aleksandr Pronzhenko (TJK)	47.97	
7	Asyeikhany Akhyt (MGL)	51.15	
—	Tilak Ram Tharu (NEP)	DNS	

==== Heat 3 ====
Rank	Athlete	Time	Notes
1	Yousef Masrahi (KSA)	46.30	Q
2	Seong Hyeok-je (KOR)	46.41	Q
3	Kunhu Muhammed (IND)	46.55	Q
4	Mohamed Obaid Al-Saadi (OMA)	47.96	
5	Srikharin Wannasa (THA)	48.23	
6	Ho Tsz Fung (HKG)	49.44	
7	Hussain Inaas (MDV)	49.83	

==== Heat 4 ====
Rank	Athlete	Time	Notes
1	Arokia Rajiv (IND)	46.41	Q
2	Nobuya Kato (JPN)	46.72	Q
3	Zhang Huadong (CHN)	47.16	Q
4	Edgardo Alejan (PHI)	47.29	q
5	Dmitriy Korobeynikov (KAZ)	48.32	
6	Ahmed Al-Merjabi (OMA)	48.88	
7	Davron Atabaev (TJK)	49.10	
8	Hussain Riza (MDV)	51.69	

=== Semifinals ===
- Qualification: First 3 in each heat (Q) and the next 2 fastest (q) advance to the final.

==== Heat 1 ====
Rank	Athlete	Time	Notes
1	Abbas Abubakar Abbas (BRN)	45.17	Q
2	Yuzo Kanemaru (JPN)	45.72	Q
3	Park Bong-go (KOR)	46.06	Q
4	Kunhu Muhammed (IND)	46.08	q
5	Zhu Chenbin (CHN)	46.58	
6	Ismail Al-Sabiani (KSA)	47.06	
7	Saud Abdelkarim (UAE)	47.27	
8	Archand Bagsit (PHI)	47.56	

==== Heat 2 ====
Rank	Athlete	Time	Notes
1	Yousef Masrahi (KSA)	45.86	Q
2	Nobuya Kato (JPN)	45.88	Q
3	Arokia Rajiv (IND)	46.22	Q
4	Seong Hyeok-je (KOR)	46.40	q
5	Zhang Huadong (CHN)	46.99	
6	Edgardo Alejan (PHI)	47.07	
7	Maytham Hussein (IRQ)	47.23	
8	Sergey Zaikov (KAZ)	47.33	

=== Final ===
Rank	Athlete	Time	Notes
1st place, gold medalist(s)	Yousef Masrahi (KSA)	44.46	GR
2nd place, silver medalist(s)	Abbas Abubakar Abbas (BRN)	45.62	
3rd place, bronze medalist(s)	Arokia Rajiv (IND)	45.92	
4	Yuzo Kanemaru (JPN)	46.04	
5	Nobuya Kato (JPN)	46.13	
6	Park Bong-go (KOR)	46.19	
7	Kunhu Muhammed (IND)	46.53	
8	Seong Hyeok-je (KOR)	46.74	
