= Athletics at the 2014 Asian Games – Men's 3000 metres steeplechase =

Men's 3000 metres steeplechase at the 2014 Asian Games
- Venue: Incheon Asiad Main Stadium
- Dates: 29 September 2014
- Competitors: 9 from 8 nations

Medalists
gold medal	Abubaker Ali Kamal	Qatar
silver medal	Tareq Mubarak Taher	Bahrain
bronze medal	Naveen Kumar	India

The men's 3000 metres steeplechase event at the 2014 Asian Games was held at the Incheon Asiad Main Stadium, Incheon, South Korea on 29 September.

== Schedule ==
All times are Korea Standard Time (UTC+09:00)

Date	Time	Event
Monday, 29 September 2014	20:20	Final

== Records ==
Prior to this competition, the existing world, Asian and Games records were as follows.

World Record	Saif Saaeed Shaheen (QAT)	7:53.63	Brussels, Belgium	3 September 2004
Asian Record	Saif Saaeed Shaheen (QAT)	7:53.63	Brussels, Belgium	3 September 2004
Games Record	Tareq Mubarak Taher (BRN)	8:25.89	Guangzhou, China	23 November 2010

== Results ==
Rank	Athlete	Time	Notes
1st place, gold medalist(s)	Abubaker Ali Kamal (QAT)	8:28.72	
2nd place, silver medalist(s)	Tareq Mubarak Taher (BRN)	8:39.62	
3rd place, bronze medalist(s)	Naveen Kumar (IND)	8:40.39	
4	Jun Shinoto (JPN)	8:41.37	
5	Dejenee Regassa (BRN)	8:43.69	
6	Wang Yashuan (CHN)	8:59.64	
7	Ali Al-Amri (KSA)	9:04.87	
8	Kim Young-jin (KOR)	9:05.38	
9	Christopher Ulboc (PHI)	9:21.63	
