= United Arab Emirates at the World Athletics Championships =

- WA code: UAE
- National federation: UAE Athletics Federation
- Website: www.uaeathletics.org
- Medals: Gold 0 Silver 0 Bronze 0 Total 0

World Athletics Championships appearances (overview)
- 1983; 1987; 1991; 1993; 1995; 1997; 1999; 2001; 2003–2007; 2009; 2011; 2013; 2015; 2017; 2019–2022; 2023; 2025

United Arab Emirates has competed at the World Athletics Championships on thirteen occasions, taking part since 1993 and failing to send a delegation in 2003, 2005 and 2007. Its competing country code is UAE. The country has not won any medals at the competition and as of 2017 none of the country's athletes have competed in a final. The country's best performance at the championships was by Betlhem Desalegn, who reached the women's 1500 metres semi-finals in 2015.
