= United Arab Emirates at the 2009 World Championships in Athletics =

- WA code: UAE

in Berlin
- Competitors: 2
- Medals: Gold 0 Silver 0 Bronze 0 Total 0

World Championships in Athletics appearances (overview)
- 1983; 1987; 1991; 1993; 1995; 1997; 1999; 2001; 2003–2007; 2009; 2011; 2013; 2015; 2017; 2019–2022; 2023; 2025

United Arab Emirates competed at the 2009 World Championships in Athletics from 15 to 23 August. A team of 2 athletes was announced in preparation for the competition.

== Team selection ==
Track and road events

| Event | Athletes | |
| Event | Men | Women |
|---|---|---|
| 200 metres | Omar Jouma Bilal Al-Salfa | |
| 400 metre hurdles | Ali Obaid Shirook | |
