= United Arab Emirates at the 2023 World Athletics Championships =

- Flag of the United Arab Emirates
- WA code: UAE

in Budapest, Hungary 19 August 2023 – 27 August 2023
- Competitors: 1 (0 men and 1 woman)
- Medals: Gold 0 Silver 0 Bronze 0 Total 0

World Athletics Championships appearances (overview)
- 1983; 1987; 1991; 1993; 1995; 1997; 1999; 2001; 2003–2007; 2009; 2011; 2013; 2015; 2017; 2019–2022; 2023

The United Arab Emirates was set to compete at the 2023 World Athletics Championships in Budapest, Hungary, which were held from 19 to 27 August 2023. The athlete delegation of the country was composed of one competitor, long-distance runner Alia Saeed Mohammed who was set to compete in the women's marathon. At the event, Mohammed did not start the race and was thus unranked.

== Background ==
The 2023 World Athletics Championships in Budapest, Hungary, were held from 19 to 27 August 2023. The Championships were held at the National Athletics Centre. To qualify for the World Championships, athletes had to reach an entry standard (e.g. time or distance), place in a specific position at select competitions, be a wild card entry, or qualify through their World Athletics Ranking at the end of the qualification period.

As the United Arab Emirates did not meet any of the four standards, they could send either one male or one female athlete in one event of the Championships who has not yet qualified. The UAE Athletics Federation selected long-distance runner Alia Saeed Mohammed who had previously competed for the nation at the 2011 World Championships in Athletics held in Daegu, South Korea, and the 2015 World Championships in Athletics held in Beijing, China.

== Results ==
Key

- Q = Qualified for the next round
- q = Qualified for the next round as a fastest loser or, in field events, by position without achieving the qualifying target
- NR = National record
- PB = Personal best
- SB = Season best
- N/A = Round not applicable for the event

=== Women ===
The women's marathon was held on 26 August 2023 with 78 competitors running in the race. In the event, Mohammed would not start the race and was thus unranked within the rankings. The eventual winner of the event was Amane Beriso Shankule of Ethiopia who ran in a time of 2:24:23.

Track and road events

Athlete	Event	Final	
Athlete	Event	Result	Rank
Alia Saeed Mohammed	Marathon	DNS	
