= 2013 Asian Athletics Championships – Men's 3000 metres steeplechase =

The men's 3000 metres steeplechase at the 2013 Asian Athletics Championships was held at the Shree Shiv Chhatrapati Sports Complex on 5 July.

== Results ==
| Rank | Name | Nationality | Time | Notes |
|---|---|---|---|---|
| 1st place, gold medalist(s) | Tareq Mubarak Taher | Bahrain | 8:34.77 | |
| 2nd place, silver medalist(s) | Dejenee Regassa | Bahrain | 8:37.40 | |
| 3rd place, bronze medalist(s) | Tsuyoshi Takeda | Japan | 8:48.48 | |
| 4 | Naveen Kumar | India | 8:49.95 | |
| 5 | Ahmad Foroud | Iran | 8:52.15 | |
| 6 | Minato Yamashita | Japan | 9:00.17 | |
| 7 | Jaiveer Singh | India | 9:02.11 | |
| 8 | Chou Ting-Yin | Chinese Taipei | 9:09.93 | |
| 9 | Maaz Abdelrahman Shagag | Qatar | 9:11.54 | |
| 10 | Pham Tien San | Vietnam | 9:17.94 | |
| | Nabil Al-Garbi | Yemen | DNF | |
