= Takayuki Kishimoto =

Japanese hurdler (born 1990)

Personal information
- Born: 6 May 1990 (age 35)
- Height: 1.70 m (5 ft 7 in)
- Weight: 60 kg (130 lb)

Sport
- Country: Mutsu, Aomori Prefecture, Japan
- Sport: Athletics
- Event: 400m Hurdles

Takayuki Kishimoto (岸本 鷹幸, Kishimoto Takayuki; born 6 May 1990) is a Japanese hurdler. At the 2012 Summer Olympics, he competed in the Men's 400 metres hurdles but was disqualified.

His personal best in the 400 metres hurdles is 48.41 seconds set in Osaka in 2012.

== Competition record ==
Year	Competition	Venue	Position	Event	Notes
Representing Japan
2011	Asian Championships	Kobe, Japan	2nd (h)	400 m hurdles	50.50
2011	Universiade	Shenzhen, China	2nd	400 m hurdles	49.52
2011	World Championships	Daegu, South Korea	20th (sf)	400 m hurdles	50.05
2012	Olympic Games	London, United Kingdom	–	400 m hurdles	DQ
2013	World Championships	Moscow, Russia	21st (h)	400 m hurdles	49.96
2014	Asian Games	Incheon, South Korea	2nd	400 m hurdles	49.81
2015	World Championships	Beijing, China	30th (h)	400 m hurdles	49.78
2018	Asian Games	Jakarta, Indonesia	10th (h)	400 m hurdles	50.95
2022	World Championships	Eugene, United States	29th (h)	400 m hurdles	50.66
2023	World Championships	Budapest, Hungary	40th (h)	400 m hurdles	50.90
