= 2013 Asian Athletics Championships – Women's 1500 metres =

The women's 1500 metres at the 2013 Asian Athletics Championships was held at the Shree Shiv Chhatrapati Sports Complex on 5 July.

== Results ==
Rank	Name	Nationality	Time	Notes
1st place, gold medalist(s)	Betlhem Desalegn	United Arab Emirates	4:13.67	
2nd place, silver medalist(s)	Mimi Belete	Bahrain	4:14.04	
3rd place, bronze medalist(s)	Ayako Jinnouchi	Japan	4:16.73	
4	Sini Markose	India	4:17.14	
5	Jaisha Orchatteri	India	4:20.11	
6	Jhuma Khatun	India	4:22.52	
7	Gulshanoi Satarova	Kyrgyzstan	4:23.26	
8	Irina Moroz	Uzbekistan	4:24.30	
9	Do Thi Thao	Vietnam	4:26.31	
10	Tatyana Neroznak	Kazakhstan	4:34.24	
	Lismawati Ilang	Indonesia	DNS	
