= Nabil Al-Garbi =

Yemeni middle-distance runner (born 1993)

- Born: 3 November 1993 (age 32); Dhamar, Yemen Yemen
- Height: 5 ft 9 in (175 cm)

Nabil Mohammed Saghir Al-Garbi (born 3 November 1993 in Dhamar) is a retired Yemeni middle-distance runner. He is described as Yemen's most notable athlete.

He finished twelfth in the 3000 metres at the 2009 World Youth Championships. In the same year he competed at the 2009 World Cross Country Championships, placing lowly. On the regional level he finished eleventh in the 3000 metres steeplechase at the 2010 Asian Games, did not finish the steeplechase race at the 2013 Asian Championships, competed in the 1500 metres at the 2011 Pan Arab Games without reaching the final, and contested the 2014 Asian Games marathon—once again without finishing.

On the global level he competed in the 1500 metres at the 2011 World Championships, the 2012 Summer Olympics and the 2013 World Championships without reaching the final.

His personal best times are 3:50.17 minutes in the 1500 metres, achieved at the 2011 World Championships in Daegu; 8:22.43 minutes in the 3000 metres, achieved in July 2009 in Aleppo; 9:16.80 minutes in the steeplechase, achieved at the 2010 Asian Games in Guangzhou; and 14:36.13 minutes in the 5000 metres, achieved in October 2010 in Aleppo.
