= Tatyana Neroznak =

Kazakhstani runner (born 1992)

Personal information
- Born: 18 February 1992 (age 34)

Sport
- Country: Kazakhstan
- Events: Middle-distance running; Long-distance running
Medal record
Women's athletics
Representing Kazakhstan
Asian Indoor Championships
Gold medal – first place	2018 Tehran	3000 m
Silver medal – second place	2018 Tehran	1500 m
Bronze medal – third place	2014 Hangzhou	800 m
Bronze medal – third place	2016 Doha	800 m

Tatyana Neroznak (born 18 February 1992) is a Kazakhstani runner. In 2020, she competed in the women's half marathon at the 2020 World Athletics Half Marathon Championships held in Gdynia, Poland.

In 2013, she competed in the women's 1500 metres event at the 2013 Asian Athletics Championships held in Pune, India.

In 2018, she competed in the women's 1500 metres event at the 2018 Asian Games held in Indonesia. She finished in 10th place.
