= Jackie Areson =

Australian long-distance runner

Personal information
- Born: 31 March 1988 (age 37)

Sport
- Country: Australia
- Event: Long-distance running

Jackie Areson (born 31 March 1988) is an Australian long-distance runner.

Competing for the Tennessee Volunteers women's track and field team, Areson won the 2011 5000 meters at the NCAA Division I Indoor Track and Field Championships in a time of 16:04.16.

In 2013, she finished in 15th place in the final of the women's 5000 metres event at the 2013 World Championships in Athletics held in Moscow, Russia.
