= 2015 World Championships in Athletics – Women's 5000 metres =

Women's 5000 metres at the 2015 World Championships
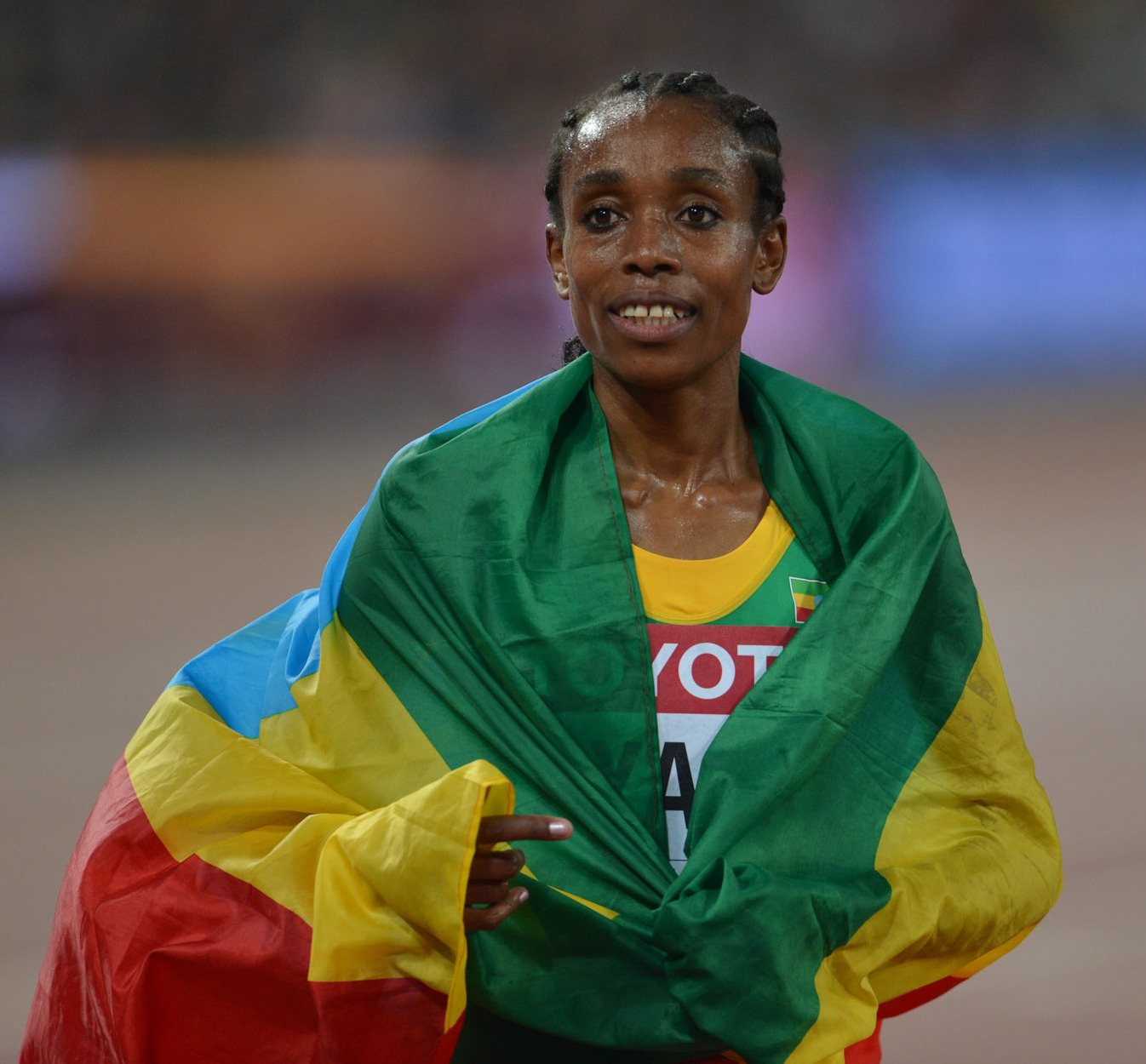
- Winner Almaz Ayana
- Venue: Beijing National Stadium
- Dates: 27 August (heats); 30 August (final)
- Competitors: 26 from 14 nations
- Winning time: 14:26.83

Medalists
gold medal	Almaz Ayana	Ethiopia
silver medal	Senbere Teferi	Ethiopia
bronze medal	Genzebe Dibaba	Ethiopia

The women's 5000 metres at the 2015 World Championships in Athletics was held at the Beijing National Stadium on 27 and 30 August. The reigning champion from 2013 Meseret Defar was absent from the competition, having not yet returned from a career break to start a family.

The race was won by a margin of 17.24 seconds. As of 2024, this remains the only time the event has been won by more than six seconds at these championships.

== Summary ==
From the gun in the final, the two Japanese runner Misaki Onishi then Ayuko Suzuki took the pace out at a serious level, the women running the same pace as the pedestrian men's race through the first 2,000. After her 1500 metres win and world record, all eyes were clearly on Genzebe Dibaba. On the first lap Dibaba went to the back of the pack. After a lap she decided to move in behind the Japanese runners. Instantly she was marked by world leader Almaz Ayana. Three laps into the race, it was a string of African runners behind the Japanese, with a gap back to all the other non-Africans. From the pace of just under 74 seconds a lap, Ayana then upped the pace, followed immediately by Dibaba and the Kenyan team running as a group led by returning silver medalist Mercy Cherono. Laps started getting quicker, 68, 67, the field stringing out 65, 64 first only Dibaba was able to follow Ayana, then she was broken, Ayana out into an insurmountable lead with three laps to go and still accelerating. More than a hundred metres behind, Senbere Teferi was battling the last of the Kenyans, Viola Kibiwot for the bronze medal position. Ayana slowed a little over the last two laps, the pace falling back to 67 seconds but the damage was done and the race was decided. Ayana pushed home in 14:26.83 to break Genzebe's sister Tirunesh Dibaba's Championship Record. Well behind, Genzebe was content to just finish the race in silver medal position, but the battle for bronze was accelerating. Onto the home stretch, Teferi put her best move on Kibiwot and was sprinting home, but in the process she passed the slowing Dibaba. Dibaba finally noticed Teferi passing and turned into sprinting making for a close finish but Teferi had the edge and took the silver medal.

It was a sweep for Ethiopia but not from a tactical situation like many Kenyan team members try to run. These were three rivals who in the process of beating each other, beat the rest of the world. Behind them, the straightaway was empty, it took 15 more seconds for the next Kenyan runner to arrive.

== Records ==
Prior to the competition, the records were as follows:

World record	Tirunesh Dibaba (ETH)	14:11.15	Oslo, Norway	6 June 2008
Championship record	Tirunesh Dibaba (ETH)	14:38.59	Helsinki, Finland	13 August 2005
World leading	Almaz Ayana (ETH)	14:14.32	Shanghai, China	17 May 2015
African record	Tirunesh Dibaba (ETH)	14:11.15	Oslo, Norway	6 June 2008
Asian record	Bo Jiang (CHN)	14:28.09	Shanghai, China	23 October 1997
NACAC record	Molly Huddle (USA)	14:42.64	Fontvieille, Monaco	18 July 2014
South American record	Simone da Silva (BRA)	15:18.85	São Paulo, Brazil	20 May 2011
European record	Liliya Shobukhova (RUS)	14:23.75	Kazan, Russia	19 July 2008
Oceanian record	Kim Smith (NZL)	14:45.93	Rome, Italy	11 July 2008
The following records were established during the competition:
Championship record	Almaz Ayana (ETH)	14:26.83	Beijing, China	30 August 2015

== Qualification standards ==
Entry standards
15:20.00

== Schedule ==
Date	Time	Round
27 August 2015	09:40	Heats
30 August 2015	19:15	Final

All times are local times (UTC+8)

== Results ==
=== Heats ===
Qualification: First 5 in each heat (Q) and the next 5 fastest (q) advanced to the final.

Rank	Heat	Name	Nationality	Time	Notes
1	2	Almaz Ayana	Ethiopia	15:09.40	Q
2	2	Senbere Teferi	Ethiopia	15:14.57	Q
3	2	Viola Kibiwot	Kenya	15:15.27	Q
4	1	Genzebe Dibaba	Ethiopia	15:20.82	Q
5	1	Mercy Cherono	Kenya	15:20.94	Q
5	1	Mimi Belete	Bahrain	15:20.94	Q
7	1	Irene Chepet Cheptai	Kenya	15:21.03	Q
8	1	Susan Kuijken	Netherlands	15:25.67	Q
9	2	Janet Kisa	Kenya	15:26.49	Q
10	2	Eloise Wellings	Australia	15:26.67	Q, SB
11	2	Ayuko Suzuki	Japan	15:28.18	q
12	1	Misaki Onishi	Japan	15:33.84	q
13	1	Stephanie Twell	Great Britain & N.I.	15:34.72	q
14	1	Nicole Tully	United States	15:41.03	q
15	2	Jennifer Wenth	Austria	15:43.57	q
16	1	Madeline Heiner	Australia	15:47.97	
17	1	Gulshat Fazlitdinova	Russia	15:48.44	
~~18~~	2	Betlhem Desalegn	United Arab Emirates	~~15:48.52~~	DQ
18	1	Nicole Sifuentes	Canada	15:50.99	
19	2	Karoline Bjerkeli Grøvdal	Norway	16:02.20	
20	2	Marielle Hall	United States	16:06.60	
21	2	Azusa Sumi	Japan	16:13.65	
22	2	Abbey D'Agostino	United States	16:16.47	
23	1	Olivia Mugove Chitate	Zimbabwe	16:34.70	PB
	2	Yelena Korobkina	Russia	DNF	
	2	Maureen Koster	Netherlands	DNF	
	1	Nikki Hamblin	New Zealand	DNS	

=== Final ===
The final was started at 19:15

Rank	Name	Nationality	Time	Notes
1st place, gold medalist(s)	Almaz Ayana	Ethiopia	14:26.83	CR
2nd place, silver medalist(s)	Senbere Teferi	Ethiopia	14:44.07	
3rd place, bronze medalist(s)	Genzebe Dibaba	Ethiopia	14:44.14	
4	Viola Kibiwot	Kenya	14:46.16	
5	Mercy Cherono	Kenya	15:01.36	
6	Janet Kisa	Kenya	15:02.68	SB
7	Irene Chepet Cheptai	Kenya	15:03.41	
8	Susan Kuijken	Netherlands	15:08.00	
9	Ayuko Suzuki	Japan	15:08.29	PB
10	Eloise Wellings	Australia	15:09.62	SB
11	Mimi Belete	Bahrain	15:17.01	
12	Stephanie Twell	Great Britain & N.I.	15:26.24	
13	Nicole Tully	United States	15:27.42	
14	Misaki Onishi	Japan	15:29.63	
15	Jennifer Wenth	Austria	15:35.46	
