= Ding Changqin =

Chinese long-distance runner

Ding Changqin (born 27 November 1991 in Longxi Town 龙溪镇, Yuqing County, Guizhou province) is a Chinese athlete specialising in the long-distance events. She represented her country in the marathon at the 2013 World Championships finishing 19th overall. In addition she won two medals at the 2014 Asian Games.

== Competition record ==
Year	Competition	Venue	Position	Event	Notes
Representing China
2010	World Half Marathon Championships	Nanning, China	44th	Marathon	1:20:01
2013	World Championships	Moscow, Russia	19th	Marathon	2:40:13
2014	Asian Games	Incheon, South Korea	3rd	5000 m	15:12.51
2014	Asian Games	Incheon, South Korea	2nd	10,000 m	31:51.86
2015	World Championships	Beijing, China	16th	Marathon	2:33:04

== Personal bests ==
Outdoor

- 3000 metres – 9:06.2 (Changbaishan 2014)
- 5000 metres – 15:12.51 (Incheon 2014)
- 10,000 metres – 31:53.09 (Incheon 2014)
- Half marathon – 1:20:01 (Nanning 2010)
- Marathon – 2:30:20 (Yingkou 2013)
- 3000 metres steeplechase – 10:38.50 (Zhaoqing 2008)
