= Athletics at the 2010 Asian Games – Women's 1500 metres =

Women's 1500 metres at the 2010 Asian Games
- Venue: Aoti Main Stadium
- Dates: 23 November 2010
- Competitors: 11 from 9 nations

Medalists
gold medal	Maryam Yusuf Jamal	Bahrain
silver medal	Trương Thanh Hằng	Vietnam
bronze medal	Mimi Belete	Bahrain

The women's 1500 metres event at the 2010 Asian Games was held at the Aoti Main Stadium, Guangzhou, China on 23 November.

== Schedule ==
All times are China Standard Time (UTC+08:00)

Date	Time	Event
Tuesday, 23 November 2010	17:35	Final

== Records ==
Prior to this competition, the existing world, Asian and Games records were as follows.

World Record	Qu Yunxia (CHN)	3:50.46	Beijing, China	11 September 1993
Asian Record	Qu Yunxia (CHN)	3:50.46	Beijing, China	11 September 1993
Games Record	Sunita Rani (IND)	4:06.03	Busan, South Korea	10 October 2002

== Results ==
Rank	Athlete	Time	Notes
1st place, gold medalist(s)	Maryam Yusuf Jamal (BRN)	4:08.22	
2nd place, silver medalist(s)	Trương Thanh Hằng (VIE)	4:09.58	
3rd place, bronze medalist(s)	Mimi Belete (BRN)	4:10.42	
4	Su Qian (CHN)	4:11.76	
5	Jhuma Khatun (IND)	4:13.46	
6	Mika Yoshikawa (JPN)	4:16.42	
7	O. P. Jaisha (IND)	4:19.62	
8	Betlhem Desalegn (UAE)	4:19.99	
9	Tatyana Borisova (KGZ)	4:21.88	
10	Leila Ebrahimi (IRI)	4:27.73	
11	Kanchhi Maya Koju (NEP)	4:38.88	
