= Naveen Kumar (athlete) =

Indian athlete (born 1988)

Naveen Dagar
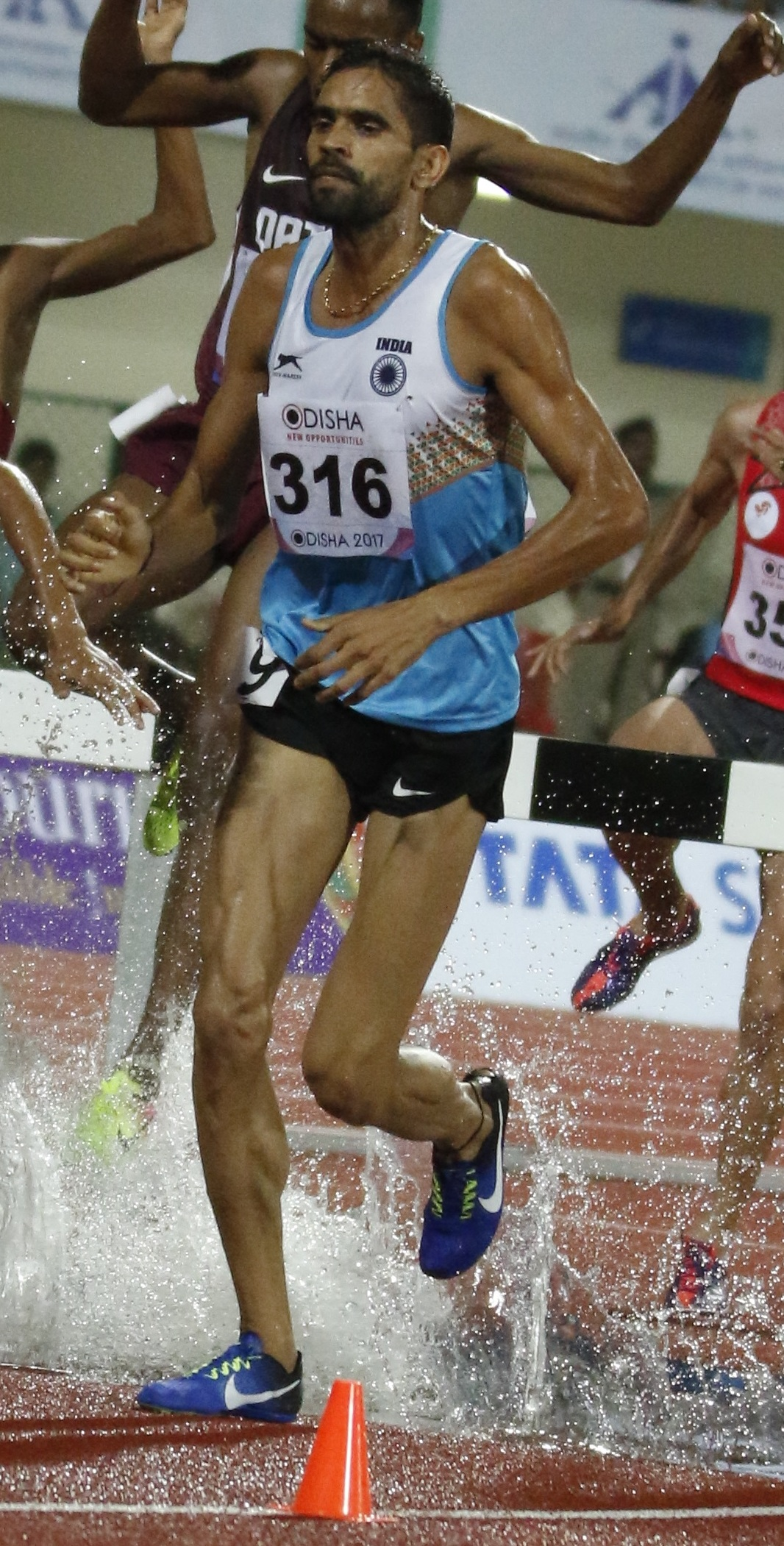

Personal information
- Native name: Naveen Dagar
- Nationality: Indian
- Born: 20 January 1988 (age 38) Chhapar, Jhajjar district, India

Sport
- Sport: Track and field
- Event: 3000 metres steeplechase
- Team: India, Indian Army, Services
Medal record
Men's athletics
Representing India
Asian Games
Bronze medal – third place	2014 Incheon	3000 m st.
National Games
Gold medal – first place	2015 Kerala	3000 m st.

Naveen Kumar (born 20 January 1988) is an Indian athlete. He belongs to Haryana. He won the bronze medal at the Asian Games 2016 in 3000M Steeplechase.

== Early life ==
Naveen Kumar born in Chhapar village of Jhajjar district, Haryana. He completed his studies in the village and graduation from All India Jat Heroes Memorial College, Rohtak, Haryana.

== Career ==
He started at young age of 12 years. His inspiration is Surendra Singh and Jaiveer Singh. He started his career at Haryana State Championship and won Gold in 4000M. He also won gold medals in 1500M & 5000M in the Haryana Olympic Games organized by Haryana State Olympic Association. Naveen Kumar joined Indian Army in 2009 and continued his practice during the training session and thereafter he participated in Indian Army Athletics Championship in 3000M Steeplechase and won gold medal. Then he represented Indian Army at Services and won silver medal.

== 2013 National Championships ==
Naveen won a silver medal at 17th Federation Cup Senior Athletics Championships, Ludhiana on 25 April 2013 with timings 08:58:38. He again got a silver medal at 53rd Inter-State Senior National Athletics Championship 2013, Chennai on 6 June 2013 with timings 08:56:00.

== 2013 Asian Athletics Championships ==
Naveen Kumar represented India for the first time in 2013 Asian Athletics Championships – Men's 3000 metres steeplechase held at Pune, Maharashtra from 3 July to 7 July and remained at 4th place in 3000M Steeplechase.

== 2014 National Championships ==
Naveen won gold medal in 3000M Steeplechase at 54th Sr. National Athletics Championship held at Lucknow, UP from 05.06.14 to 08.06.14 and also set a meet record as he finished 08:42.26 sec by breaking the previous meet record of Rama Chandran(08:42.58 sec) set in 2011.

== 2014 Asian Games ==
Naveen represented India at the Asian Games 2014, Incheon in 3000M Steeplechase and won bronze medal by performing his best 08:40.39 sec.

== 2015 National Games of India ==
Naveen won gold medal in 3000M Steeplechase men at 35th National Games, Kerala. The event was held at University Stadium, Trivandrum on 13.02.15 with finishing time 08:52.54.
