= El-Hassan El-Abbassi =

Moroccan-Bahraini long-distance runner

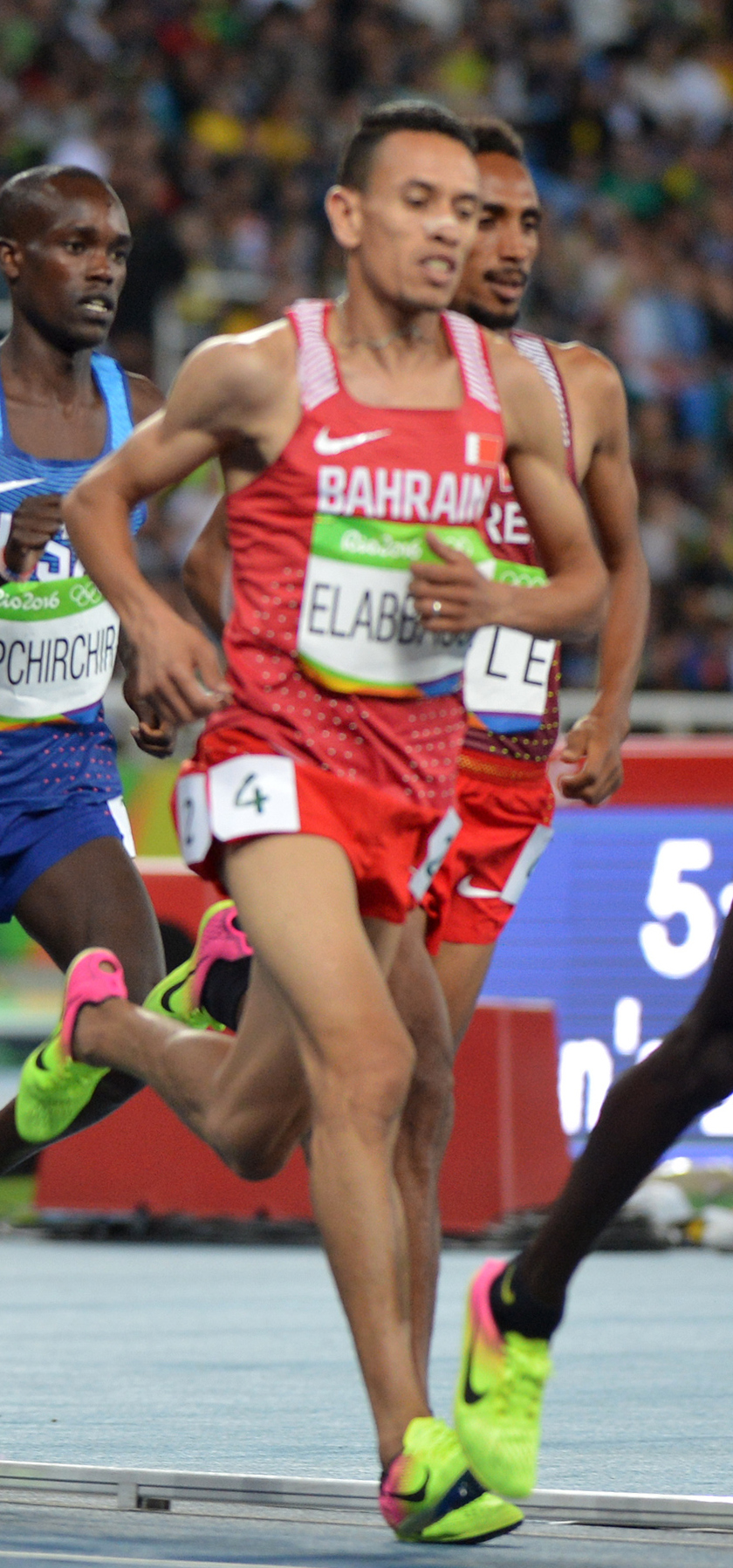
- El-Abbassi at the 2016 Olympics

Personal information
- Born: 13 April 1984 (age 42)
- Height: 171 cm (5 ft 7 in)
- Weight: 61 kg (134 lb)

Sport
- Sport: Athletics
- Event: 1500-half marathon
Medal record
Representing Bahrain
Asian Games
Gold medal – first place	2014 Incheon	10,000 m
Silver medal – second place	2018 Jakarta	Marathon
Asian Athletics Championships
Gold medal – first place	2015 Wuhan	10,000 m

El Hassan El-Abbassi (born 13 April 1984) is a Moroccan-born long-distance runner who competes internationally for Bahrain. He was the gold medallist in the 10,000 metres at the 2014 Asian Games and the 2015 Asian Athletics Championships. He has a personal best of 27:25.02 minutes for that distance.

El-Abbassi served a three-year competition ban from August 2021 to August 2024 for an anti-doping rule violation relating to the use of a prohibited method (homologous blood transfusion) at the Tokyo 2020 Olympic Games.

== Career ==
El-Abbassi initially ran in middle-distance events but a move up to longer distances brought him his first successes. In his debut over the distance, he set a personal best of 62:53 minutes at the 2011 Marrakesh Half Marathon. His first race abroad followed in February and he was the surprise winner at the Eurocross cross country meet. An outing at the Corrida de Langueux 10K run brought him fourth place. He had three further outings over the half marathon distance that year and was in the top three each time: he was runner-up in Zwolle, set a personal best of 61:13 minutes for third at the Route du Vin Half Marathon, and was under 62 minutes again to win at the Zhuhai Half Marathon in China that December. He failed to progress much further in 2012, with a podium finish at the Yangzhou Half Marathon and fourth at the Philadelphia Distance Run being his best races abroad. However, he did win his first national title over 10,000 metres with a personal best time of 28:12.40 minutes.

El-Abbassi established himself among the world's road running elite in 2013. In January he set a new best of 61:09 minutes over the half marathon in Marrakesh. His best run that year was in an event almost half that distance: at the Ottawa 10K in Canada he won in a lifetime best of 27:37 minutes, ranking sixth globally that year as a result. He also had a sub-28-minute race at the Casablanca 10K one week later.

He decided to start running for Bahrain and formally requested a transfer of allegiance in August 2013. He became eligible to compete for his new nation in July 2014. He set two track bests in the 2014 season: first a time of 13:33.95 minutes for the 500 metres at the Rabat Meeting then a 27:32.96-minute best over the 10,000 m at the Prefontaine Classic. The latter time ranked him eleventh in the world that year and the second fastest non-Kenyan after world-leader Galen Rupp. His international debut for Bahrain was at the 2014 Asian Games. Running in the 10,000 m he held the lead and beat Suguru Osako to the line to win the gold medal – maintaining Bahrain's dominance for a third straight edition.

Following participation in the marathon event at the Tokyo 2020 Olympic Games, on 18 August 2021 the Athletics Integrity Unit announced that El-Abbassi had been provisionally suspended from competition after returning an adverse analytical finding for a homologous blood transfusion. He was subsequently issued with a three-year ban from 2021 to 2024.

== International competitions ==
Year	Competition	Venue	Position	Event	Notes
2014	Asian Games	Incheon, South Korea	1st	10,000 m	28:11.20
2015	Asian Championships	Wuhan, China	1st	10,000 m	28:50.71
2015	World Championships	Beijing, China	12th	10,000 m	28:12.57
2015	Military World Games	Mungyeong, South Korea	1st	10,000 m	27:41.76
2016	Olympic Games	Rio de Janeiro, Brazil	26th	10,000 m	28:20.17
2018	Asian Games	Jakarta, Indonesia	2nd	Marathon	2:18:32
2019	World Championships	Doha, Qatar	7th	Marathon	2:11:44

== Personal bests ==
- 1500 metres – 3:49.2h min (2009)
- 3000 metres – 8:15.05 min (2009)
- 5000 metres – 13:19.36 min (2016)
- 10000 metres – 27:25.02 min (2015)
- 10K run – 27:26 min (2016)
- Half marathon – 59:27 min (2018)
- Marathon – 2:04:43 min (2018)
