= Betlhem Desalegn =

Emirati middle-distance runner

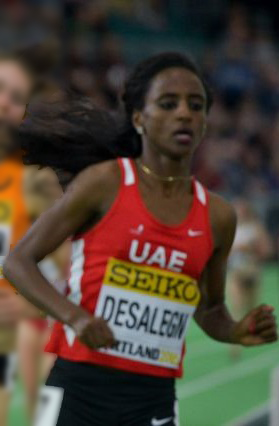
- Betlhem Desalegn at the 2016 World Indoor Championships

Personal information
- Born: 13 November 1991 (age 34) Addis Ababa, Ethiopia
- Height: 1.65 m (5 ft 5 in)
- Weight: 52 kg (115 lb)

Sport
- Sport: Athletics
- Events: 1500 m, 5000 m
- Coached by: Jama Aden
Medal record
Women's athletics
Representing United Arab Emirates
Asian Indoor Championships
Gold medal – first place	2016 Doha	1500 m
Gold medal – first place	2016 Doha	3000 m
Silver medal – second place	2012 Hangzhou	1500 m
Silver medal – second place	2012 Hangzhou	3000 m
Silver medal – second place	2014 Hangzhou	1500 m
Silver medal – second place	2014 Hangzhou	3000 m
Pan Arab Games
Silver medal – second place	2011 Doha	5000 m
Bronze medal – third place	2011 Doha	1500 m

Betlhem Desalegn Belayneh (Amharic: ቤተልሄም ደሳለኝ በላይነህ; born 13 November 1991 in Addis Ababa) is an Ethiopian-born Emirati middle-distance runner. At the 2012 Summer Olympics, she competed in the Women's 1500 metres.

In 2017, Betlhem was banned for two years for the irregularities in her biological passport. In addition to the ban, all of her results between 6 March 2014 and 22 July 2016 were voided.

== Competition record ==
Year	Competition	Venue	Position	Event	Notes
Representing United Arab Emirates
2010	West Asian Championships	Aleppo, Syria	4th	800 m	2:10.42
2010	West Asian Championships	Aleppo, Syria	3rd	1500 m	4:29.24
2010	Asian Games	Guangzhou, China	13th (h)	800 m	2:10.80
2010	Asian Games	Guangzhou, China	8th	1500 m	4:19.99
2011	Asian Championships	Kobe, Japan	5th	1500 m	4:24.38
2011	Asian Championships	Kobe, Japan	5th	5000 m	16:04.98
2011	Pan Arab Games	Doha, Qatar	3rd	1500 m	4:21.50
2011	Pan Arab Games	Doha, Qatar	2nd	5000 m	16:12.71
2012	Asian Indoor Championships	Hangzhou, China	2nd	1500 m	4:16.97
2012	Asian Indoor Championships	Hangzhou, China	2nd	3000 m	8:53.56
2012	World Indoor Championships	Istanbul, Turkey	15th (h)	3000 m	9:12.63
2012	Olympic Games	London, United Kingdom	33rd (h)	1500 m	4:14.07
2012	West Asian Championships	Dubai, United Arab Emirates	1st	800 m	2:14.30
2012	West Asian Championships	Dubai, United Arab Emirates	1st	1500 m	4:32.92
2012	West Asian Championships	Dubai, United Arab Emirates	3rd	4 × 400 m relay	4:19.04
2013	Arab Championships	Doha, Qatar	3rd	1500 m	4:55.23
2013	Arab Championships	Doha, Qatar	1st	5000 m	15:48.59
2013	Asian Championships	Pune, India	1st	1500 m	4:13.67
2013	Asian Championships	Pune, India	1st	5000 m	15:12.84
2013	World Championships	Moscow, Russia	32nd (h)	1500 m	4:12.97
2013	World Championships	Moscow, Russia	18th (h)	5000 m	16:13.27
2013	Islamic Solidarity Games	Palembang, Indonesia	3rd	1500 m	4:20.09
2013	Islamic Solidarity Games	Palembang, Indonesia	2nd	5000 m	16:16.84
2014	Asian Indoor Championships	Hangzhou, China	2nd	1500 m	4:19.83
2014	Asian Indoor Championships	Hangzhou, China	2nd	3000 m	8:46.54
2014	World Indoor Championships	Sopot, Poland	DQ	3000 m	DQ
2014	Asian Games	Incheon, South Korea	DQ	1500 m	DQ
2014	Asian Games	Incheon, South Korea	DQ	5000 m	DQ
2015	Arab Championships	Isa Town, Bahrain	DQ	800 m	DQ
2015	Arab Championships	Isa Town, Bahrain	DQ	1500 m	DQ
2015	Asian Championships	Wuhan, China	DQ	1500 m	DQ
2015	Asian Championships	Wuhan, China	DQ	5000 m	DQ
2015	World Championships	Beijing, China	DQ	1500 m	DQ
2015	World Championships	Beijing, China	DQ	5000 m	DQ
2016	Asian Indoor Championships	Doha, Qatar	DQ	1500 m	DQ
2016	Asian Indoor Championships	Doha, Qatar	DQ	3000 m	DQ
2016	World Indoor Championships	Portland, United States	DQ	3000 m	DQ

== Personal bests ==
Outdoor

- 400 metres – 58.07 (Manama 2013)
- 800 metres – 2:06.81 (Sollentuna 2013) NR
- 1500 metres – 4:05.13 (Doha 2013)
- 3000 metres – 8:53.75 (Stockholm 2015)
- 5000 metres – 15:12.84 (Pune 2013)
- 3000 metres steeplechase – 9:53.19 (Stockholm 2014)

Indoor

- 1500 metres – 4:05.61 (Stockholm 2015)
- 3000 metres – 8:44.59 (Doha 2016)
