= Isaac Korir =

Kenyan-Bahraini long-distance runner (born 1990)

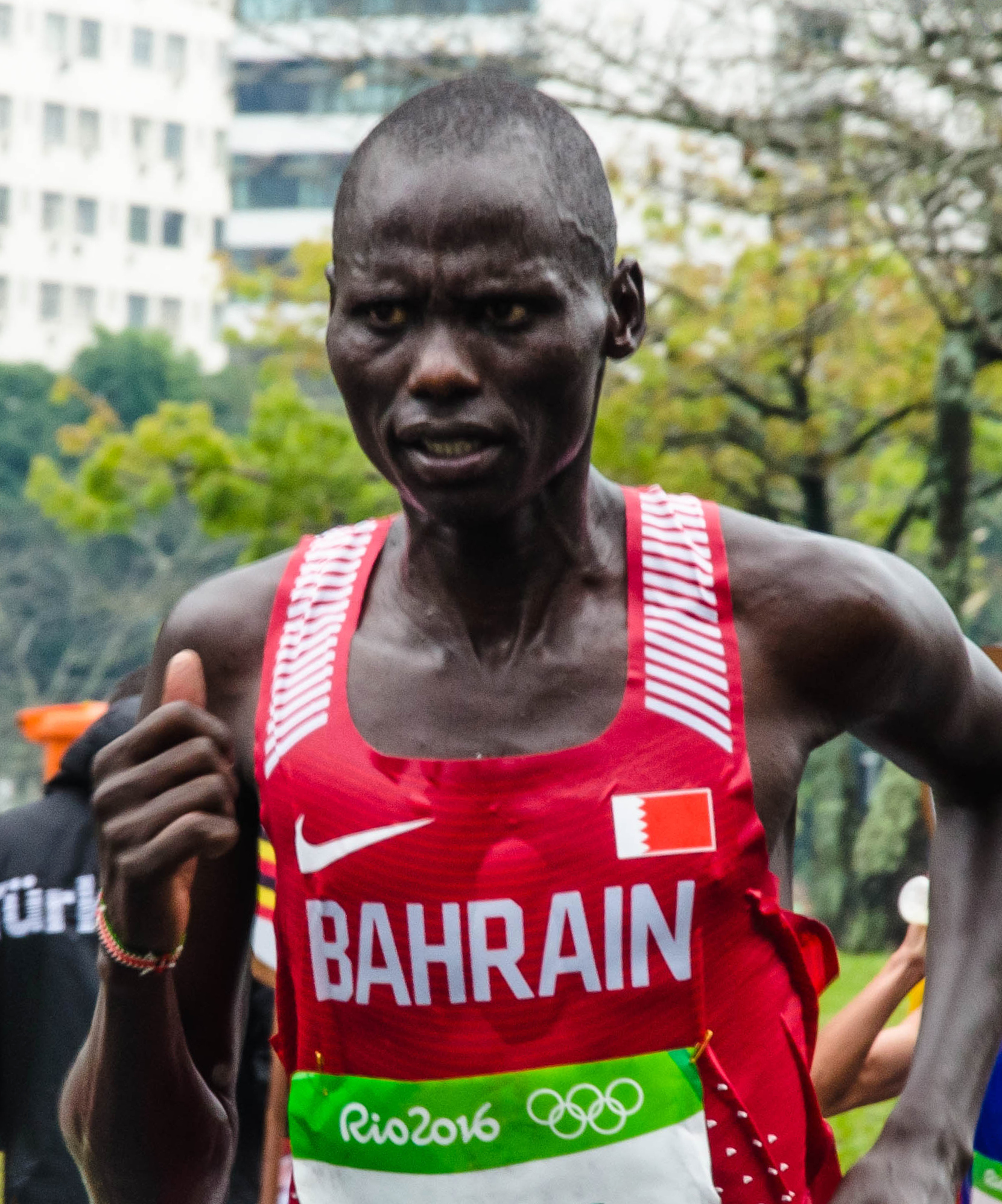
- Korir at the 2016 Olympics

Personal information
- Full name: Isaac Korir Madareng Kedikou
- Nationality: Bahraini
- Born: 26 August 1990 (age 36)
- Education: University of Eldoret
- Height: 1.88 m (6 ft 2 in)
- Weight: 59 kg (130 lb)

Sport
- Sport: Track and field
- Event: Long distance running

Achievements and titles
- Personal bests: 10,000 m: 28:05.46 (Nairobi 2010) 15 km: 43:23 (København 2014); 20 km: 58:29 (København 2014); Half marathon: 1:01:40 (København 2014) Marathon: 2:14:50 (Frankfurt 2011)
Medal record
Representing Bahrain
Event	1st	2nd	3rd
Arab Athletics Championships	0	1	0
Asian Games	0	0	1
Total	0	1	1
Event	1st	2nd	3rd
10,000 m	0	1	1
Arab Athletics Championships
Silver medal – second place	2013 Doha	10,000 m
Asian Games
Bronze medal – third place	2014 Incheon	10,000 m

Isaac Korir Madareng Kedikou (born 26 August 1990) is a Kenyan-born Bahraini long-distance runner. He has competed in competitions such as the Arab Athletics Championships, Asian Games, IAAF World Half Marathon Championships and the IAAF World Cross Country Championships, before 2013 for Kenya and after that for Bahrain.

== Career ==
=== 2013 ===
Korir's first major athletics competition was the 2013 Arab Athletics Championships. He performed well and came second place in the 10,000 metres with a time of 29:48.59 behind compatriot, Alemu Bekele who won the race with a time of 29:43.45.

=== 2014 ===
In 2014, Korir competed in two international competitions, the 2014 Asian Games and the 2014 IAAF World Half Marathon Championships. At the Asian Games Korir competed in the 10,000 meters, coming third in a time of 28:45.65. At the World Half Marathon Championships Korir performed the best on the Bahraini team coming 23 in a personal best time of 1:01:40. This time was only 16 seconds off the national record set in 2006 by Abdelhak Zakaria. Overall, 2014 was a successful year for Korir.

=== 2015 ===
In 2015, Korir competed in the 2015 IAAF World Cross Country Championships. He assisted the Bahraini team in coming 3rd in the Senior Men's race standings, placing 4 on the team and 18 overall in a time of 36:27.

=== 2016 ===
In 2016, Korir took part in the 2016 Summer Olympics, competing in the marathon event. However, he was unable to finish the event, resulting in a DNF.

== Personal bests ==
Korir does not currently hold any Bahraini national records in athletics, despite his times being quite close to the current records.

=== Outdoor ===
Distance	Time	Date	Location
10,000 metres	28:05.46	26 June 2010	Nairobi
15 kilometres	43:23	29 March 2014	København
20 kilometres	58:29	29 March 2014	København
Half marathon	1:01:40	29 March 2014	København
Marathon	2:14:50	30 October 2011	Frankfurt

=== Indoor ===
Distance	Time	Date	Location
1500 metres	3:45.88	7 January 2014	Doha
