= Gopi Chandra Parki =

Nepali runner

Gopi Chandra Parki (uhknown language)
Personal information
- Born: 7 July 1989 (age 36)
- Employer: Armed Police Force
- Height: 1.65 m (5 ft 5 in)
- Weight: 60 kg (132 lb)

Sport
- Country: Nepal
- Sport: Running

Achievements and titles
- National finals: 13th South Asian Games
Medal record
Men's athletics
Representing Nepal
South Asian Games
Gold medal – first place	2019 Kathmandu	5000 m

Gopi Chandra Parki (Nepali: गोपी चन्द्र पार्की; born 7 July 1989) is a Nepalese long-distance runner. He won a gold medal in the 13th South Asian Games. He is a member of the Armed Police Force of Nepal.

Parki was initially selected to represent Nepal in the marathon at the 2020 Tokyo Olympics via the universality rule but was not included on the final team.
