= Marina Khmelevskaya =

Uzbekistani athlete

Personal information
- Born: 30 July 1990 (age 35) Fergana, Uzbek SSR, Soviet Union

Sport
- Sport: Track and field
- Event: Marathon

Marina Khmelevskaya (born 30 July 1990) is an Uzbekistani long-distance runner who specialises in the marathon. She competed in the women's marathon event at the 2016 Summer Olympics.
