= Eunice Kirwa =

Kenyan-born Bahraini long-distance runner (born 1984)

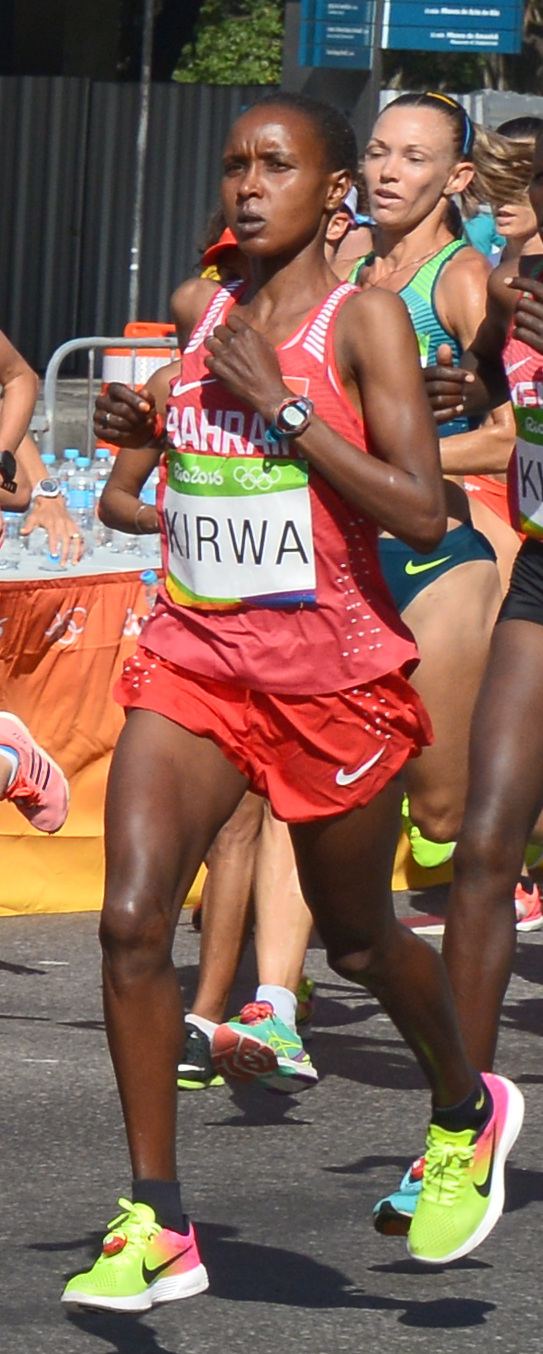
- Kirwa at the 2016 Olympics

Personal information
- Born: 20 May 1984 (age 42) Kenya
- Height: 155 cm (5 ft 1 in)
- Weight: 49 kg (108 lb)

Sport
- Sport: Athletics

Achievements and titles
- Personal bests: 1500 m – 4:27.62 (1999); 3000 mS – 10:18.3 (2005); 10 km – 31:57 (2012); Half marathon – 1:08:31 (2014); Marathon – 2:21:17 (2017)
Medal record
Representing Bahrain
Olympic Games
Silver medal – second place	2016 Rio de Janeiro	Marathon
World Championships
Bronze medal – third place	2015 Beijing	Marathon
Asian Games
Gold medal – first place	2014 Incheon	Marathon

Eunice Jepkirui Kirwa (born 20 May 1984) is a Kenyan-born Bahraini long-distance runner who specialises in marathon running. Having switched countries in 2013, she is the Bahraini record holder with 2:21:17 hours for the distance, set in 2017 at Nagoya Women's Marathon. She was the silver medallist in the marathon at the 2016 Rio de Janeiro Olympic Games.

At the start of her career, she represented Kenya at the IAAF World Youth Championships in Athletics over 1,500 metres. She changed to road running and reached the top level of the sport in 2012 after moving up to the marathon distance. Her husband, Joshua Kiprugut Kemei, is also a long-distance runner. The couple have a son.

Kirwa was suspended in May 2019 after failing a doping test.

== Career ==
Kirwa made her international debut for Kenya at the age of fifteen at the inaugural 1999 World Youth Championships in Athletics. She finished fifth over 1,500 metres at the competition, while her compatriot Sylvia Kibet took silver. She returned to the distance at the 2001 World Youth Championships in Athletics but did not make the final on that occasion. She did not compete at major events over the next few years and tried out the steeplechase instead. She was runner-up at the 2004 North Rift Championships in the 2,000 m steeplechase, then came third in the 3,000 m version at the Kenyan Athletics Championships later that year.

Failing to make the transition to senior success on the track, she switched to road running around 2006 and began competing on the circuit in North America. Her best result that year was a run of 32:52 minutes over a 10K run in Toronto. A Brazilian tour in 2008 saw her in the top two in all her races, including a best of 75:00 minutes at the São Paulo Half Marathon. She returned to the country the following year to set a best of 73:34 minutes in São Paulo and win the Rio de Janeiro Half Marathon. In 2010, she and her husband Joshua Kiprugut Kemei were a victorious couple at the Rio de Janeiro race. She had a third straight victory at the competition in 2011, setting a new best of 70:29 minutes in the process.

Kirwa established herself among the world's elite road runners in her late twenties. At the Azkoitia-Azpeitia Half Marathon in March 2012 she knocked almost two minutes off her personal best to win the race in a time of 68:39 minutes. This was the fastest time ever recorded in Spain over that distance. Heading to Brazil in May, she set a 10K best of 31:57 minutes. She made her debut over the full marathon distance in August that year, winning on her first attempt – her time of 2:33:42 hours in Asunción was the fastest ever on Paraguayan soil. The 2012 Amsterdam Marathon marked a significant breakthrough: in the top level marathon she kept pace with Meseret Hailu for most of the race and, after falling behind in their duel, she eventually finished in second place. Kirwa's time of 2:21:41 hours was quicker than the previous course record and ranked her 16th worldwide that year (by far her highest career ranking).

Kirwa began 2013 at the Xiamen Marathon and placed a comfortable second behind Fatuma Sado. Her best outing of the season followed at the Paris Marathon, where she ran 2:23:34 hours for third place (ranking within the top twenty for that year). In the half marathon she was runner-up on three straight occasions: in Lisbon (ten seconds behind world champion Edna Kiplagat), Gifu (six seconds behind course record-breaker Mestawet Tufa), and Luanda. Her last race of the year was the Frankfurt Marathon, but another sub-2:24 run was only enough for fifth.

Determined to compete in international competition, in December 2013 she transferred her eligibility to Bahrain, a rich Middle-East state. She became able to run for her adopted nation in July 2014. Kirwa entered the 2014 Boston Marathon, but for the first time she failed to finish the distance. She won the second marathon of her career in June, taking the top honours at the Lanzhou Marathon with a course record of 2:31:53 hours and a winning margin of over six minutes. A win at the Luanda Half Marathon in 68:31 minutes marked a personal best and lifted her into the top ten runners for that year. On her international debut for Bahrain, she came away with the marathon gold medal at the 2014 Asian Games, beating Japan's Ryoko Kizaki in the final section of the race. This made her Bahrain's first ever winner in the event at the competition.

=== Doping ban ===
Kirwa was suspended in May 2019 after she tested positive for the banned blood-boosting hormone Erythropoietin (EPO). She was the second Olympic marathon medalist from the 2016 games to fail a doping test after the gold medalist Jemima Sumgong.

== International competitions ==
Year	Competition	Venue	Position	Event	Notes
1999	World Youth Championships	Bydgoszcz, Poland	5th	1500 metres	
2001	World Youth Championships	Debrecen, Hungary	7th (heats)	1500 metres	
2012	Asunción International Marathon	Asunción, Paraguay	1st	Marathon	02:33:42
2014	Asian Games	Incheon, South Korea	1st	Marathon	
2015	Nagoya Women's Marathon	Nagoya, Japan	1st	Marathon	
2015	World Championships	Beijing, China	3rd	Marathon	2:27:39
