= Mimi Belete =

Ethiopian-born Bahraini runner (born 1988)

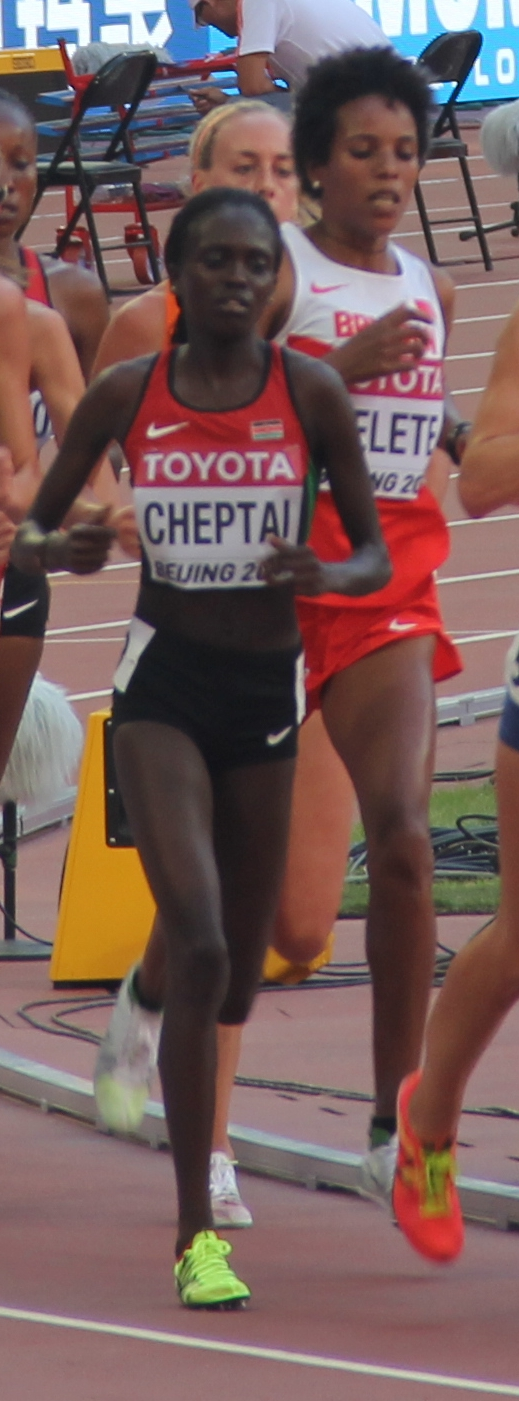
- Mimi Belete (right) in 2015

Personal information
- Born: 9 June 1988 (age 38) Ethiopia
Medal record
Women's athletics
Representing Bahrain
Asian Games
Gold medal – first place	2010 Guangzhou	5000 m
Bronze medal – third place	2010 Guangzhou	1500 m

Mimi Belete Gebregeiorges (born 9 June 1988) is an Ethiopian-born middle and long-distance runner who competes internationally for Bahrain. She won the 5000 metres title at the 2010 Asian Games.

She moved to Belgium as a political refugee along with her younger sister, Almensh Belete, who is also a runner. It was in Belgium that she began competing: she ran at the 2007 Memorial van Damme in Brussels and was the 2009 winner of the Eurocross competition. She chose to transfer allegiance to Bahrain in early 2009 and her first outing for her newly adopted country was at the Asian Cross Country Championships, where she took the silver medal behind fellow convert Maryam Yusuf Jamal. She ran at the 2009 IAAF World Cross Country Championships in March and finished in 28th place. She also qualified for the 1500 metres at the 2009 World Championships in Athletics and reached the semi-finals of the event. At the end of the year she set indoor bests at the 2009 Asian Indoor Games, taking fourth place in the 800 metres and taking the runner-up spot in the 1500 metres behind Liu Qing.

She started her 2010 with a defence of her title at the Eurocross before going on to take 16th place at the 2010 IAAF World Cross Country Championships in Bydgoszcz. She improved her 3000 metres best with a fourth-place finish in 8:32.18 at the Herculis IAAF Diamond League meeting in July, and a month later she ran a personal best of 4:00.25 for the 1500 m, taking second place behind Jamal at the Rieti Meeting. She was selected to represent the Asia-Pacific team at the 2010 IAAF Continental Cup and came in fourth place in the 1500 m. Belete won two medals at the 2010 Asian Games in November. She made a team effort with Jamal in the 1500 m and ended up with the bronze medal as Truong Thanh Hang edged her near the finish. Running in the 5000 m, she managed to fend off an Indian challenge in the form of Preeja Sreedharan and Kavita Raut to secure the gold medal in a personal best of 15:15.59 minutes, completing her first major title win.

On October 12, 2018, she won the Toronto Waterfront Marathon, with a course record time and personal best of 2:22:28.

== Competition record ==
Year	Competition	Venue	Position	Event	Notes
2009	Asian Cross Country Championships	Manama, Bahrain	2nd	Women's race	
2009	World Cross Country Championships	Amman, Jordan	28th	Women's race	
2009	World Championships	Berlin, Germany	24th (sf)	1500 m	4:13.30
2009	Asian Championships	Guangzhou, China	6th	1500 m	4:35.30
2009	Asian Indoor Games	Hanoi, Vietnam	4th	800 m	2:06.67
2009	Asian Indoor Games	Hanoi, Vietnam	2nd	1500 m	4:19.79
2010	Continental Cup	Split, Croatia	4th	1500 m	4:22.27
2010	West Asian Championships	Aleppo, Syria	3rd	800 m	2:09.00
2010	West Asian Championships	Aleppo, Syria	1st	1500 m	4:21.67
2010	Asian Games	Guangzhou, China	3rd	1500 m	4:10.42
2010	Asian Games	Guangzhou, China	1st	5000 m	15:15.59
2011	World Championships	Daegu, South Korea	7th	1500 m	4:07.60
2012	Olympic Games	London, United Kingdom	18th (sf)	1500 m	4:05.91
2013	Asian Championships	Pune, India	2nd	1500 m	4:14.04
2013	World Championships	Moscow, Russia	23rd (sf)	1500 m	4:14.22
2013	Islamic Solidarity Games	Palembang, Indonesia	4th	1500 m	4:21.10
2014	World Indoor Championships	Sopot, Poland	16th (h)	1500 m	4:16.02
2014	Asian Games	Incheon, South Korea	2nd	1500 m	4:11.03
2014	Asian Games	Incheon, South Korea	2nd	5000 m	15:00.87
2015	World Championships	Beijing, China	11th	5000 m	15:17.01
2016	Olympic Games	Rio de Janeiro, Brazil	19th (h)	5000 m	15:29.72

== Other notable races ==
Key: Course record

Year	Competition	Venue	Position	Event	Notes
2018	Toronto Waterfront Marathon	Toronto, Ontario, Canada	1st	Women's Marathon	2:22:28
