= Lishan Dula =

Bahraini-Ethiopian runner (born 1987)

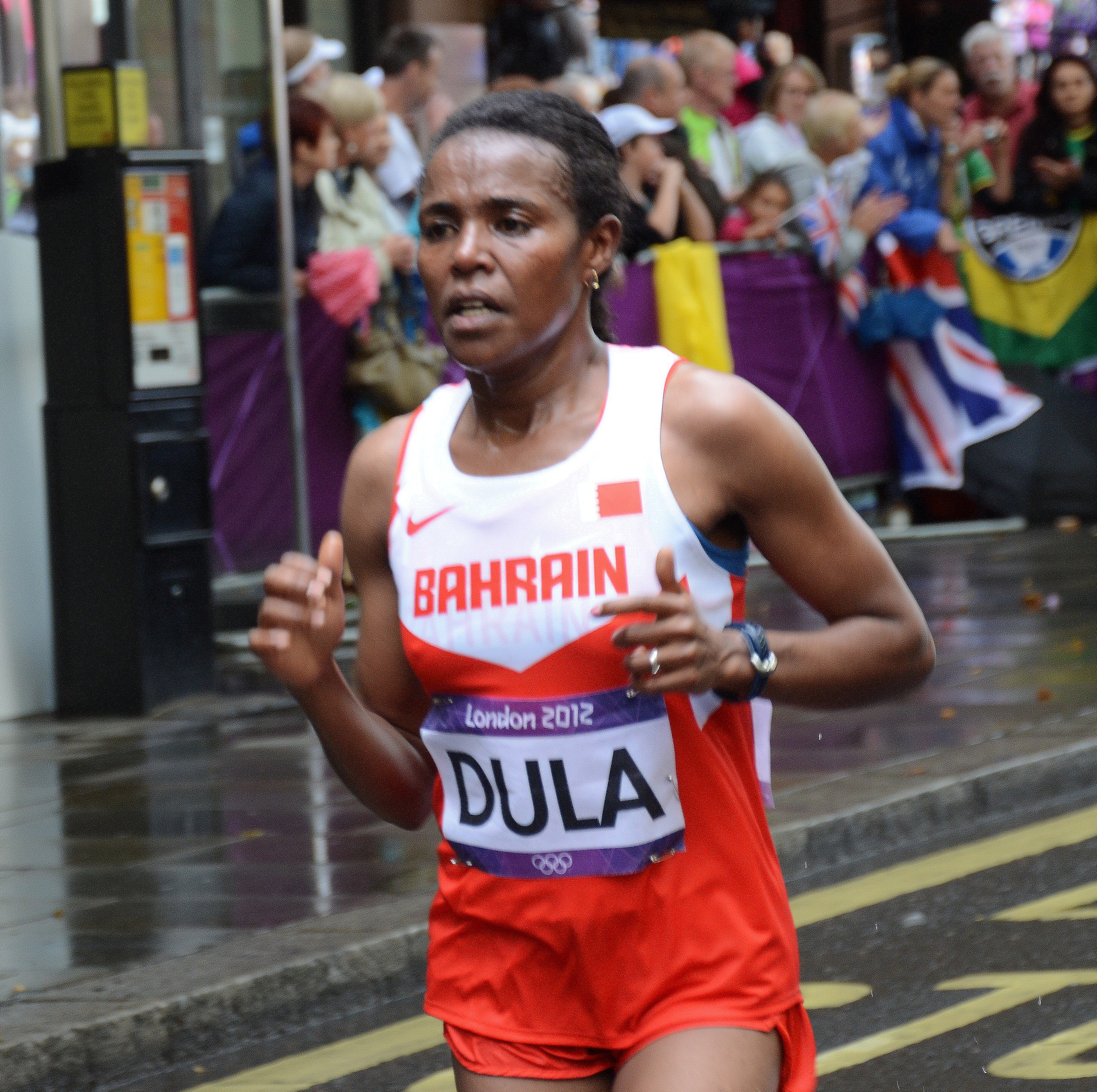
- Lishan Dula in the 2012 Summer Olympics marathon

Personal information
- Born: February 17, 1987 (age 39)
- Height: 1.64 m (5 ft 4 1/2 in)
- Weight: 44 kg (97 lb)

Sport
- Country: Ethiopia
- Sport: Athletics
- Event: Marathon

Lishan Dula Gemechu (born February 17, 1987, in Ethiopia) is a long-distance runner for Bahrain. She competed in the marathon at the 2012 Summer Olympics, placing 62nd with a time of 2:36:20.
