= Alemu Bekele =

Ethiopian long-distance runner (born 1990)

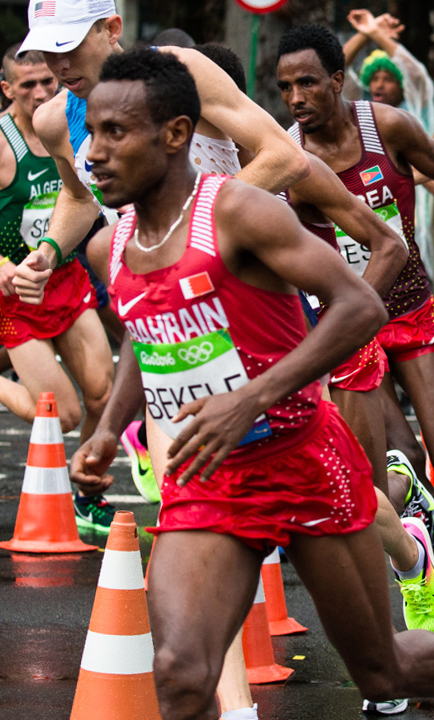
- Alemu at the 2016 Olympics

Personal information
- Born: 23 March 1990 (age 36)
- Education: Addis Ababa University
- Height: 162 cm (5 ft 4 in)
- Weight: 59 kg (130 lb)

Sport
- Sport: Athletics
- Event(s): Steeplechase, 10,000 m, half marathon, marathon

Achievements and titles
- Personal best(s): 1500 m – 3:40.83 (2011); 5000 m – 13:18.00 (2013); 10,000 m – 27:56.20 (2012); HM – 1:01:38 (2016); Marathon – 2:06:04 (2019)
Medal record
Representing Bahrain
Asian Games
Silver medal – second place	2014 Incheon	5000 m
Asian Championships
Gold medal – first place	2013 Pune	10,000 m
Silver medal – second place	2013 Pune	5000 m
Bronze medal – third place	2011 Kobe	5000 m
Asian Indoor Championships
Bronze medal – third place	2012 Hangzhou	3000 m

Alemu Bekele Gebre (born 23 March 1990) is an Ethiopian professional long-distance runner who competes internationally for Bahrain. He specialises in the 5000 metres and 10,000 metres.

He transferred to Bahrain as a junior (under-19) athlete and won the 5000m bronze medal at the 2011 Asian Athletics Championships. He took the 3000 metres bronze at the 2012 Asian Indoor Athletics Championships before raising to the top of the region by winning the 10,000m title and 5000m silver at the 2013 Asian Athletics Championships.

He also races in cross country competitions: he was the 2012 Asian champion, 2013 World Military champion, and is a three-time participant of the IAAF World Cross Country Championships.

== Career ==
=== Early life ===
Alemu Bekele Gebre was born and raised in Lemu, a small rural farming community near Bekoji in Ethiopia's Arsi Zone. He grew up in a family of nine children and spent his early years assisting his parents with their cereal crops. He moved to stay with his grandparents when he started school but he became distracted from his studies as his interest in running grew. His father urged him to focus on his schoolwork and Alemu did so, going on to high school in Bekoji in 2005. The coach at the school, Sentayehu Eshetu, had taught world champions Kenenisa Bekele and Tirunesh Dibaba previously and Alemu again threw himself into running practice. His father refused to support him further and forced him to leave the family home.

Alemu lived on the streets for a period but continued to run in local races. A good performance at a youth trial race in 2007 earned him a training place with the Ethiopian Athletics Federation and the prestigious Muger Cement athletics club took him in. He earned a stipend of 200 Ethiopian Birr to continue training, but wished to compete abroad and earn more from his running. Aware of the path of previous Ethiopian athletes, he contacted the Bahrain Athletics Association and asked if he could transfer to run for the oil-rich Middle East country. The Bahraini authorities agreed and in his first competition for them, the 2009 Asian Cross Country Championships he won the junior section.

At the World half marathon championships in Denmark, Alemu complete the half marathon in 1:01:46.

=== Running for Bahrain ===
At the 2009 IAAF World Cross Country Championships he placed 26th in the junior race. Later that year he went on to place third in the 5000 metres at the Arab Athletics Championships, sixth at the 2009 Asian Athletics Championships, and won silver medals in the 1500 metres and 5000m at the Asian Indoor Games. In his first senior year he was much improved. After 31st place at the 2010 IAAF World Cross Country Championships he ran personal bests of 7:54.47 minutes for the 3000 metres and 13:38.10 minutes for the 5000m. The 2011 season was mixed: he managed only 68th at the World Cross Country Championships and was seventh in the 1500m at the Military World Games, but he won the bronze medal at the 2011 Asian Athletics Championships before setting a 1500m best of 3:40.83 minutes for sixth at the Pan Arab Games.

Alemu broke new ground in 2012. He started with a 3000m best of 7:48.04 minutes for a bronze medal at the 2012 Asian Indoor Athletics Championships. He failed to make it out of the heats of the event at the 2012 IAAF World Indoor Championships but won the men's title at the Asian Cross Country Championships a few weeks later. In May he set two new bests: 69:31 minutes for the half marathon and 27:56.20 minutes for the 10,000 metres at the FBK Games. He ended the track season with a personal best of 13:21.54 minutes for the 5000m. He began 2013 with a win at the World Military Cross Country Championships, but failed to finish at the 2013 IAAF World Cross Country Championships.

=== Asian title ===
He won the 10,000 m title at the 2013 Arab Championships and repeated that finish at the 2013 Asian Athletics Championships, where he was also the 5000m runner-up behind fellow Bahraini-Ethiopian transferee Dejenee Regassa.

== See also ==
- List of Asian Games medalists in athletics
