= Incheon Asiad Main Stadium =

Multi-purpose stadium in Incheon, South Korea

Incheon Stadium
- Asiad Main Stadium
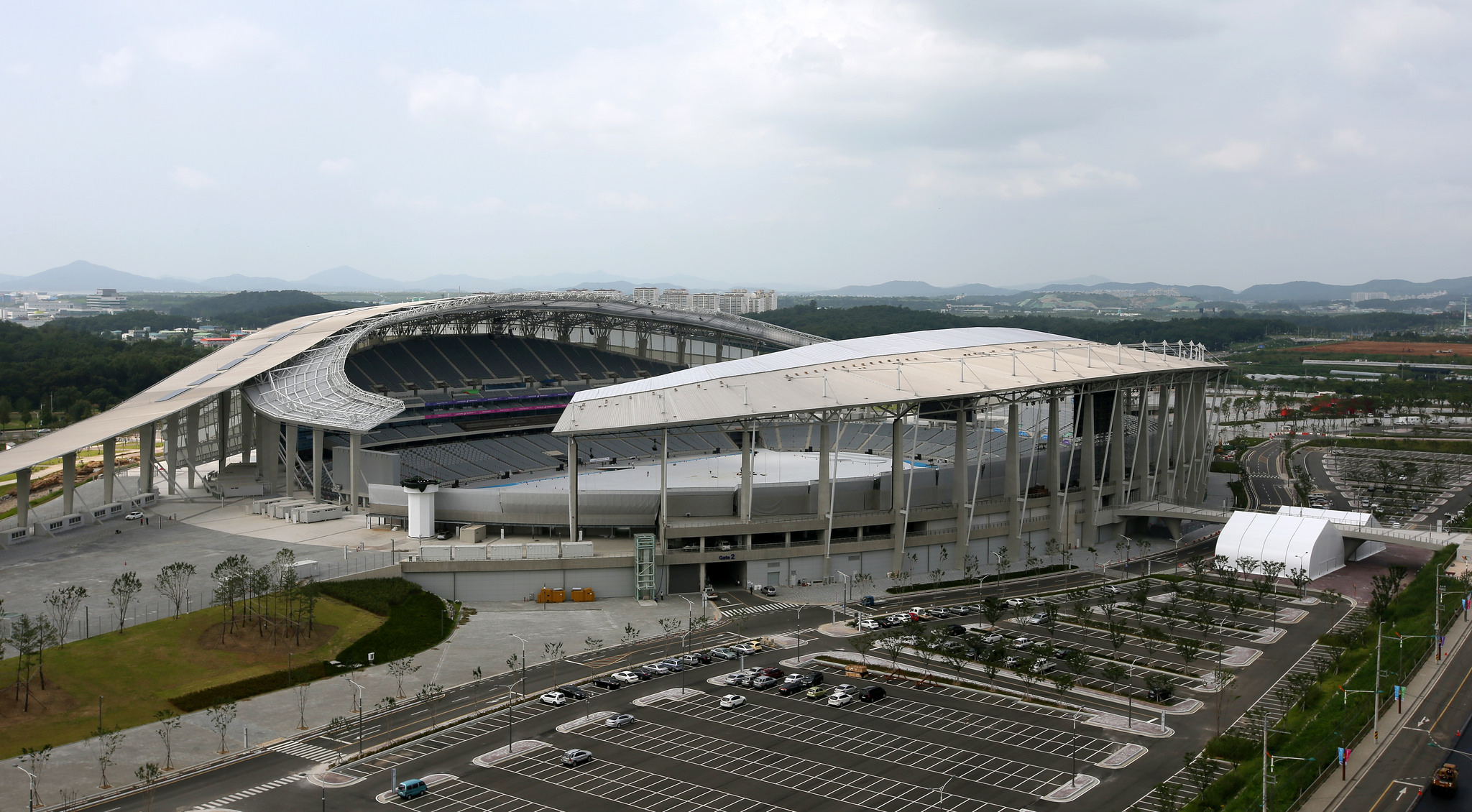
- View of Stadium in June 2014
- Interactive map of Incheon Stadium
- Full name: Incheon Asiad Main Stadium
- Location: 1048 Bongsu-daero; Seo-gu, Incheon; South Korea
- Coordinates: 37.547418°N 126.665797°E
- Owner: Municipality of Incheon
- Capacity: 29,465; 61,074 (2014 Asian Games)
- Surface: Grass

Construction
- Groundbreaking: 25 June 2011
- Opened: 1 July 2014
- Cost: South Korean won 496 billion US$ 429 million
- Architect: Populous

The Incheon Stadium, commonly known as the Incheon Asiad Main Stadium (Korean: 인천아시아드주경기장), is a stadium located in Incheon, South Korea. Completed in July 2014, it is used mostly for athletics and was the main venue of the 2014 Asian Games. The stadium has been designed with an initial capacity of roughly 60,000 spectators. After the 2014 Asian Games, capacity was reduced to 30,000 spectators. The stadium has an oval running track enclosing a regulation-size soccer field. Outside, there's a tennis court, a subsidiary stadium, and the 1,415 m^{2} (15,230 sq ft) Yeonhui Cricket Ground.

The main stadium was used for the opening and closing ceremony and athletics competitions of the 2014 Asian Games and 2014 Asian Para Games. Utilizing the long linear landscape from South to North to actively connect to surrounding parks, and the natural continuity of the rooftops to facilitate the approach by spectators, in order to overcome the difficulty of approaching the long site while emphasizing the potential of the area. It attempts to depict the movements of people with the lines and soft curvatures of dancing in order to link with Seungmu (Buddhist dance), and to express dynamic movement with the tide and wind, which represent the sea of Incheon. The stadium was used for the music video of the NewJeans' debut song "Attention" in 2022.

== Design and construction ==
On April 17, 2007, Incheon was chosen as the venue for the 15-day Asiad that would be held from September to October 2014. Forecasts at the time indicated that around 20,000 people would participate in the event, with 13,000 athletes and delegates from the 43 National Olympic Committees from Asia were going to represent their countries, while around 7 thousand media representatives could to cover the event.

Due to the lack of a stadium or a suitable place in the city for athletics events, the Bid Committee decided to build a stadium that suited the needs of the Games. But, at the same time as it was built for the event, could not become a "white elephant", as the city's main stadium was Munhak Stadium. However, Olympic Council of Asia rules state that the minimum capacity for a stadium to host ceremonies and athletics during the Asian Games is of more than 45,000 people. Due this conditions, the bid committee made an international competition winning by the global architecture firm Populous that also designed London's London Olympic Stadium has designed the stadium in collaboration with Heerim Architects and Planners. The chief feature of the stadium is its sustainability. The design configures the main facilities towards the permanent western side, while the temporary seating spaces towards the eastern side. The temporary seating will be removed after the games.

In the beginning of the stadium, the reflections of the traditional Buddhist ritual Seung Moo Dance is seen. It exhibits form and space around active movement. The forces of yin and yang form the nucleus of the architectural design. The stadium was built based on the three concepts of "incorporating light", "bringing in the rising wind", and "dancing with joy" to embody the energy of Incheon and the excitement shared by the participating countries through sporting events.

The five-story main stadium stretches across a total ground area of 113,620 m^{2} (28.08 acres) and is designed to seat over 60,000 spectators. Its two huge roofs form delicate undulating curves and its overall shape looks like a spaceship, which blends perfectly with the vast lawn plaza. The surrounding areas of the main stadium were designed in an environment-friendly manner, including the Eco Canal that connects two streams flowing nearby and Biotope, a small-scale ecological habitat. The sculptures throughout the stadium grounds are also noteworthy. After Asian Games come to an end, the main stadium will be re-purposed into a multi-use space for a wider range of cultural events The stadium uses eco-friendly energy, such as solar heat and terrestrial heat, as well as state-of-the-art information technologies (IT). Seven sports facilities such sports as swimming, volleyball, tennis and bowling will get under way.

== Transport ==
The stadium has a total of 1,977 parking spaces. The stadium is served by ten different bus stops (Line 1, 7, 13, 17, 17-1, 70, 77, 700, 700-1 and 903) and also 42-1 for 78 m (85 yd) that is linked to downtown. Geomam station (Airport Railroad Line), Exit 1 is other transport link. Incheon Subway Line 2 has a total of four stations in the Asiad Park.

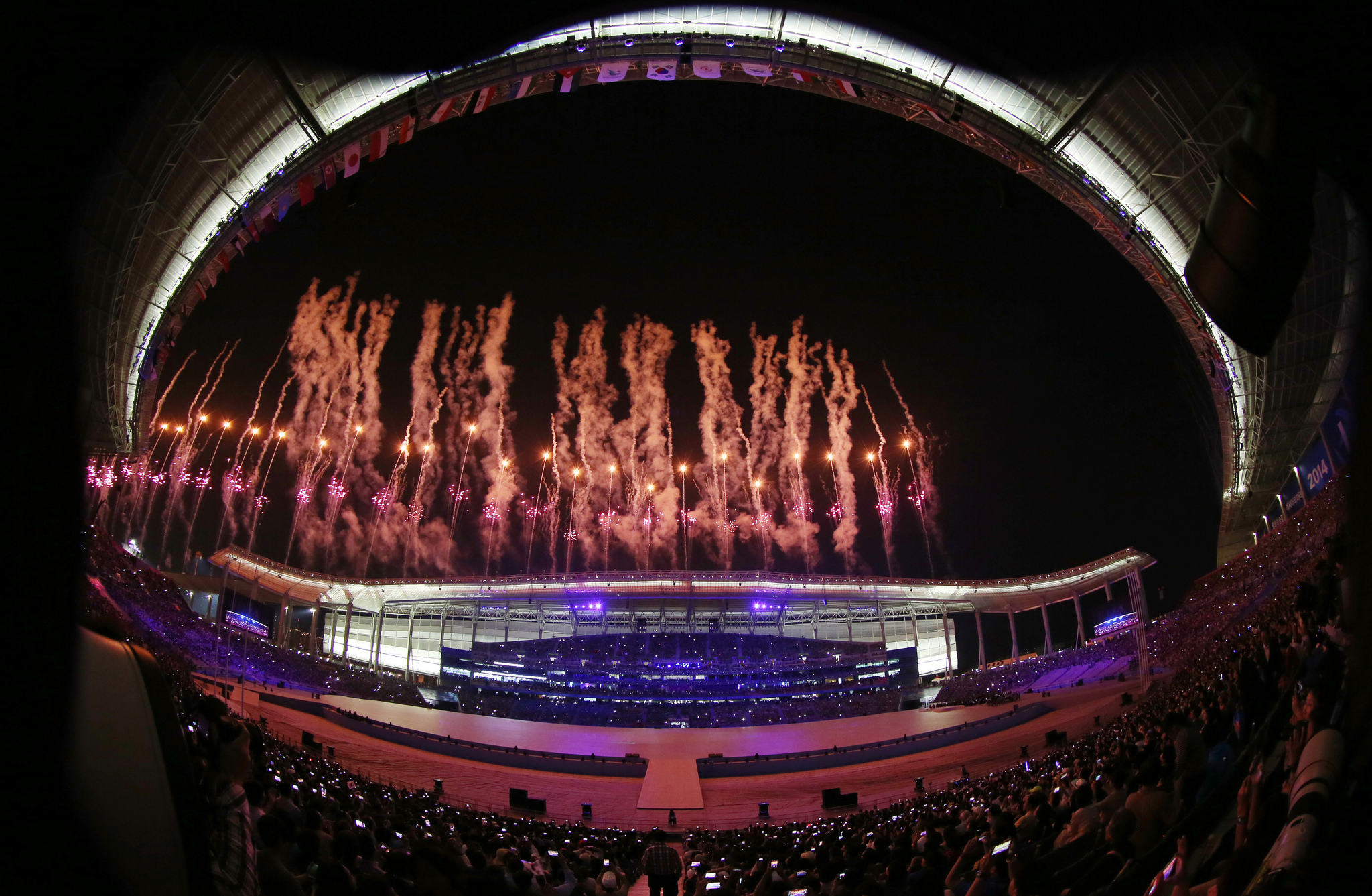
Stadium during 2014 Asian Games opening ceremony

== See also ==
- Sports in South Korea
- Incheon Munhak Stadium
- Incheon Football Stadium
- Yeonhui Cricket Ground
- Seoul Olympic Stadium
- Asian Games

Preceded by Haixinsha Island; Guangzhou	Asian Games; Opening and Closing Ceremonies; 2014	Succeeded by Gelora Bung Karno Stadium; Jakarta
Preceded by Guangdong Olympic Stadium; Guangzhou	Asian Games; Main Stadium; 2014	Succeeded by Gelora Bung Karno Stadium; Jakarta
