= 2019 Asian Athletics Championships – Women's 10,000 metres =

2019 ASEAN Women Athletics Championship,10000 meter

Women's 10,000 metres at the 2019 Asian Athletics Championships
- Venue: Khalifa International Stadium
- Location: Doha, Qatar
- Dates: 23 April
- Competitors: 7 from 5 nations
- Winning time: 31:15.62 CR

Medalists
gold medal	Shitaye Eshete	Bahrain
silver medal	Hitomi Niiya	Japan
bronze medal	Sanjivani Baburao Jadhav	India

The women's 10,000 metres at the 2019 Asian Athletics Championships was held on 23 April.

== Records ==
Records before the 2019 Asian Athletics Championships
Record	Athlete (nation)	Time (s)	Location	Date
World record	Almaz Ayana (ETH)	29:17.45	Rio de Janeiro, Brazil	12 August 2016
Asian record	Wang Junxia (CHN)	29:31.78	Beijing, China	8 September 1993
Championship record	Alia Saeed Mohammed (UAE)	31:52.29	Wuhan, China	7 June 2015
World leading	Emily Sisson (USA)	30:49.57	Palo Alto, United States	29 March 2019
Asian leading	Ayumi Hagiwara (JPN)	32:09.87	Palo Alto, United States	29 March 2019

== Results ==
Rank	Name	Nationality	Time	Notes
1st place, gold medalist(s)	Shitaye Eshete	Bahrain	31:15.62	CR
2nd place, silver medalist(s)	Hitomi Niiya	Japan	31:22.63	SB
3rd place, bronze medalist(s)	Sanjivani Baburao Jadhav	India	32:44.96	PB
4	Xia Yuyu	China	33:02.31	PB
5	An Seul-ki	South Korea	33:13.17	SB
6	Yuka Hori	Japan	33:15.65	
7	Zhang Deshun	China	34:09.63	SB
