= Athletics at the 2010 Asian Games – Women's 10,000 metres =

Women's 10,000 metres at the 2010 Asian Games
- Venue: Aoti Main Stadium
- Date: 21 November 2010
- Competitors: 11 from 7 nations

Medalists
| gold medal | Preeja Sreedharan | India |
| silver medal | Kavita Raut | India |
| bronze medal | Shitaye Eshete | Bahrain |

The women's 10,000 metres event at the 2010 Asian Games was held at the Aoti Main Stadium, Guangzhou, China on 21 November 2010.

== Schedule ==
All times are China Standard Time (UTC+08:00)

| Date | Time | Event |
|---|---|---|
| Sunday, 21 November 2010 | 17:55 | Final |

== Records ==
Prior to this competition, the existing world, Asian and Games records were as follows.

| World Record | Wang Junxia (CHN) | 29:31.78 | Beijing, China | 8 September 1993 |
| Asian Record | Wang Junxia (CHN) | 29:31.78 | Beijing, China | 8 September 1993 |
| Games Record | Sun Yingjie (CHN) | 30:28.26 | Busan, South Korea | 8 October 2002 |

== Results ==
| Rank | Athlete | Time | Notes |
|---|---|---|---|
| 1st place, gold medalist(s) | Preeja Sreedharan (IND) | 31:50.47 | |
| 2nd place, silver medalist(s) | Kavita Raut (IND) | 31:51.44 | |
| 3rd place, bronze medalist(s) | Shitaye Eshete (BRN) | 31:53.27 | |
| 4 | Kayoko Fukushi (JPN) | 31:55.54 | |
| 5 | Hikari Yoshimoto (JPN) | 32:06.73 | |
| 6 | Viktoriia Poliudina (KGZ) | 32:16.34 | |
| 7 | Tejitu Daba (BRN) | 32:21.29 | |
| 8 | Bai Xue (CHN) | 32:39.13 | |
| 9 | Triyaningsih (INA) | 33:07.45 | |
| 10 | Zhang Xin (CHN) | 33:19.61 | |
| 11 | Luvsanlkhündegiin Otgonbayar (MGL) | 36:11.85 | |
