= 2013 Asian Athletics Championships – Women's 5000 metres =

The women's 5000 metres at the 2013 Asian Athletics Championships was held at the Shree Shiv Chhatrapati Sports Complex on 7 July.

== Results ==
Rank	Name	Nationality	Time	Notes
1st place, gold medalist(s)	Betlhem Desalegn	United Arab Emirates	15:12.84	CR
2nd place, silver medalist(s)	Shitaye Eshete	Bahrain	15:22.17	
3rd place, bronze medalist(s)	Tejitu Daba	Bahrain	15:38.63	
4	Alia Saeed Mohammed	United Arab Emirates	15:45.55	
5	Shiho Takechi	Japan	16:01.29	
6	Gulzhanet Zhanatbek	Kazakhstan	16:16.07	
7	Preeja Sreedharan	India	16:29.64	
8	O. P. Jaisha	India	16:35.47	
9	Kim Chun Mi	North Korea	16:37.77	
10	Kim Son Hui	North Korea	16:38.98	
11	Rajasekara Niluka Geethani	Sri Lanka	16:43.52	
12	Viktoriia Poliudina	Kyrgyzstan	16:57.85	
13	Mariia Korobitskaia	Kyrgyzstan	16:58.53	
	Kavita Raut	India	DNS	
	Sitora Khamidova	Uzbekistan	DNS	
