= Hitomi Niiya =

Japanese long-distance runner (born 1988)

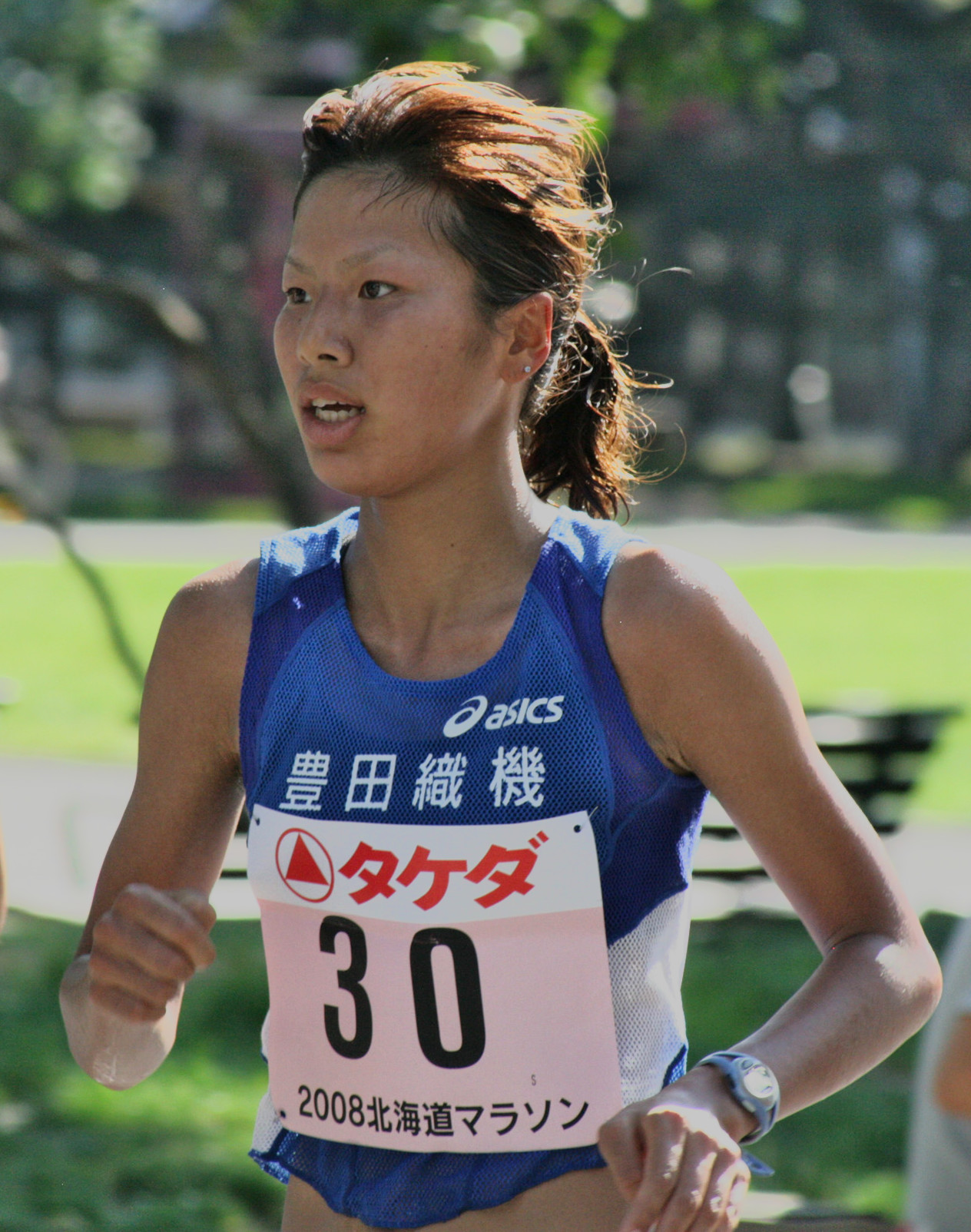
- Niiya in 2008 Hokkaido Marathon

Personal information
- Born: 26 February 1988 (age 38) Sōja, Okayama, Japan

Sport
- Country: Japan
- Sport: Women's athletics

Achievements and titles
- Personal bests: 3000 m: 9:09.27; 5000m: 14:55.83; 10,000 m: 30:20.44; Half marathon: 66:38 NR; Marathon: 2:19:24 (Houston 2023)
Medal record
Asian Championships
Silver medal – second place	2011 Kobe	5000 m
Silver medal – second place	2019 Doha	10,000 m
World Youth Championships
Bronze medal – third place	2005 Marrakesh	5000 m

Hitomi Niiya (新谷 仁美, Niiya Hitomi; born 26 February 1988) is a Japanese professional long-distance runner who competes in track, cross country running and marathon races. Niiya competed for Japan at the 2012 Summer Olympics. She is a two-time silver medallist at the Asian Athletics Championships and has represented Japan three times at the World Athletics Championships (2011, 2013, 2019). She represents Team Toyota Industries in national competition.

She formed part of the Japanese junior team at the IAAF World Cross Country Championships from 2004 to 2006, helping them to team medals each time. She also won a bronze medal over 5000 metres at the 2005 World Youth Championships. Niiya won the 2007 Tokyo Marathon at the age of eighteen in her debut over the marathon distance. Her best for the event is 2:30:58 hours. She has also had success in ekiden relay running, having represented Japan at the Yokohama International Women's Ekiden and helped Toyota Industries to their first team title domestically. She is the Japanese record holder in the half marathon (1:06:38) set during a win at the Houston Half Marathon.

== Career ==
=== Youth ===
Niiya attended Kōjōkan Senior High School and began competing in track and field and cross country running while there. After winning the junior selection race at the Chiba Cross Country, Niiya made her international debut at the 2004 IAAF World Cross Country Championships and her nineteenth-place finish helped the Japanese junior women to the team bronze medal. She took a consecutive victory in Chiba in February 2005, thus returning to the world event the following year. She improved to thirteenth place and helped the Japanese team to another bronze alongside Akane Wakita and Yurika Nakamura. The 2005 World Youth Championships in Athletics in Marrakesh provided her the venue for her first international individual medal, as she claimed the bronze in the 3000 metres. That October, she won the 3000 m at the 2005 National Sports Festival of Japan in Okayama, being the only local athlete to win at the festival. At the end of that year she won at the inter-high school championships and ran the second fastest time ever for a Japanese high school student in the 5000 metres, taking her title with a time of 15:28.70 minutes.

Niiya repeated both her thirteenth placing and team bronze at the 2006 IAAF World Cross Country Championships junior race, but began to move towards ekiden road running competitions that year.

=== Senior debut ===
She represented Japan in the Yokohama International Women's Ekiden and just edged past Ethiopia's Ameba Denboba on the final leg to lift Japan into the top three. After graduating from high school she chose to focus on running full-time, working under coach Yoshio Koide, who trained Olympic champion Naoko Takahashi. The rebooted Tokyo Marathon in 2007 did not invite any elite level women and Niiya filled the void, entering the race among the thousands of public runners, and won the women's race, recording a time of 2:31:01 hours for her debut over the distance.

In March 2008, she debuted in the half marathon, finishing with a time of 1:11:41 hours to take third place behind Mara Yamauchi and Rie Takayoshi at the Matsue Ladies Half Marathon. She competed in her second marathon that August but found herself behind Yukari Sahaku (also coached by Koide) and finished in second place at the Hokkaido Marathon. Her year ended on a high note as she helped Toyota Industries to their first title at the All Japan Corporate Team Women's Ekiden Championships.

Her third marathon came in March 2009 at the Nagoya Marathon – she was leading at 30 km and although she achieved a personal best time of 2:30:58, she slowed in the latter stages and finished eighth. At the Oda Memorial in April she won the 5000 m with a personal best time of 15:23.27 minutes. The following year, a third-place finish in Fukuoka gained her a place on the senior team for the 2010 IAAF World Cross Country Championships, where she finished in 31st place.

Her 2011 season began with two domestic victories at the Chiba and Fukuoka Cross Country races, winning by large margins in both. At the 2011 IAAF World Cross Country Championships she finished in 26th place, helping Japan to seventh in the women's team rankings. On the track, she ran a 5000 m best of 15:13.12 minutes in June then claimed the 2011 Asian Athletics Championships silver medal in the event a month later, finishing behind Ethiopian-born Bahraini Tejitu Daba. She was selected for the 2011 World Championships in Athletics and reached the 5000 m final, coming 13th overall. At the Chiba International Ekiden in November she ran a stage record on the final leg to help Japan to second place behind Kenya.

The Inter-Prefectural Women's Ekiden in January 2012 saw Niiya win the final 10K stage to lift the Chiba team into third place overall. She was the best-performing Asian-born runner at the 2012 Asian Cross Country Championships, where she finished fourth in the women's race. She gained the Olympic A standard for the 10,000 m with a world-leading and personal best run of 31:28.26 minutes to win at the Hyogo Relays. She represented Japan in both the 5000 m and 10,000 m at the 2012 London Olympics. She set a best of 30:59.19 minutes for ninth place at the 10,000 metres final and ran a best of 15:10.20 minutes in the 5000 metres heats. She won the 5000 m at both the Japanese National Games and the Japanese Championships that year.

She won the Fukuoka cross country title for a third year running in February 2013.

Niiya competed in the 10,000m at the World Athletics Championships in Moscow on 11 August 2013. Taking the lead early on, she led for the majority of the race but was outsprinted in the last 600m eventually finishing fifth in a personal best time of 30:56.70.

=== Injury and return ===
On 31 January 2014, at a press conference, Niiya officially announced her retirement from running professionally, citing her foot injury as the cause. In November 2012, she was diagnosed with plantar fasciitis in her right foot and had decided then that the 2013 World Championships would be her last professional race. When asked to reflect back on her past career as a runner, she said, "Once I'm a granny I might think, 'Man that was hard,' but right now I have nothing but good memories" and that her favorite memory was winning the National High School Ekiden Championships while attending Kōjōkan High School. When asked about her future away from the sport, she said, "It's a complete blank. I can't imagine what I'll be doing. I can't do anything useful for society, but I will completely cut off connection with the world of athletics." She cried with her mother and left these final words for future athletes: "Always do what you think is the right thing no matter what anybody tells you."

She returned to competition in 2018 following rehabilitation for her injury and became the first Japanese winner at the Zatopek 10K in Australia in December 2018, setting a long-term aim to make the team for Japan at the 2020 Summer Olympics in Tokyo. She marked her return to the international stage the following year with a silver medal over 10,000 m at the 2019 Asian Athletics Championships, third at the Japanese Athletics Championships, then eleventh at the 2019 World Athletics Championships. In January 2020 Niiya surprised the field at the Houston Half Marathon by winning in a Japanese record time of 66:38, the fastest time ever by a woman born outside of Kenya or Ethiopia. She won by a minute-and-a-half, and beat the previous Japanese half-marathon record by 48 seconds. In January 2023 Niiya won the Houston Marathon in a time of 2:19:24, almost eclipsing the Japanese record of 2:19:12 set in 2005 by Mizuki Noguchi. She won by six minutes.

== International competitions ==
Year	Competition	Venue	Position	Event	Notes
2005	World Youth Championships	Marrakesh, Morocco	3rd	3000 m	9:10.34
2011	Asian Championships	Kobe, Japan	2nd	5000 m	15:34.19
2011	World Championships	Daegu, South Korea	13th	5000 m	15:41.67
2012	Olympic Games	London, United Kingdom	10th (heats)	5000 m	15:10.20
2012	Olympic Games	London, United Kingdom	9th	10,000 m	30:59.19
2013	World Championships	Moscow, Russia	5th	10,000 m	30:56.70
2019	Asian Championships	Doha, Qatar	2nd	10,000 m	31:22.63
2019	World Championships	Doha, Qatar	11th	10,000 m	31:12.99
2021	Olympic Games	Tokyo, Japan	21st	10,000 m	32:23.87
2022	Tokyo Marathon	Tokyo, Japan	7th	42.195 km	2:21:17
2022	Houston Marathon	Houston, United States	1st	42.195 km	2:19:24

== National titles ==
- Japan Championships in Athletics
  - 5000 m: 2012
  - 10,000 m: 2013

== Major Wins ==
- Tokyo Marathon: 2007
- Fukuoka International Cross Country: 2011, 2012, 2013
- Chiba International Cross Country: 2011
- Houston Half Marathon: 2020

== Personal bests ==
- 3000 metres – 9:10.34 (13 July 2005)
- 5000 metres – 15:10.20 (7 August 2012)
- 10,000 metres – 30:20.44 (4 December 2020) NR
- Half marathon – 1:06:38 (19 January 2020) NR
- Marathon – 2:19:24 (15 January 2023)
