= 2009 Asian Athletics Championships – Women's 10,000 metres =

The women's 10,000 metres event at the 2009 Asian Athletics Championships was held at the Guangdong Olympic Stadium on November 14.

== Results ==
Rank	Name	Nationality	Time	Notes
1st place, gold medalist(s)	Bai Xue	China	34:11.14	
2nd place, silver medalist(s)	Kavita Raut	India	34:17.21	PB
3rd place, bronze medalist(s)	Wang Jiali	China	34:22.64	
4	Tejitu Daba	Bahrain	34:26.07	PB
5	Mari Ozaki	Japan	34:29.89	
6	Viktoriia Poliudina	Kyrgyzstan	34:33.86	
7	Preetel Rao	India	35:22.65	
8	Battsetseg Baatarkhuu	Mongolia	35:40.17	PB
	Gladys Jerotich Kibiwot	Bahrain	DNF	
	Iuliia Arkhipova	Kyrgyzstan	DNS	
	Leila Ebrahimi	Iran	DNS	
