= Athletics at the 2014 Asian Games – Women's 10,000 metres =

Women's 10,000 metres at the 2014 Asian Games
- Venue: Incheon Asiad Main Stadium
- Dates: 27 September 2014
- Competitors: 13 from 9 nations

Medalists
gold medal	Alia Saeed Mohammed	United Arab Emirates
silver medal	Ding Changqin	China
bronze medal	Ayumi Hagiwara	Japan

The women's 10,000 metres event at the 2014 Asian Games was held at the Incheon Asiad Main Stadium, Incheon, South Korea on 27 September.

== Schedule ==
All times are Korea Standard Time (UTC+09:00)

Date	Time	Event
Saturday, 27 September 2014	19:25	Final

== Records ==
Prior to this competition, the existing world, Asian and Games records were as follows.

World Record	Wang Junxia (CHN)	29:31.78	Beijing, China	8 September 1993
Asian Record	Wang Junxia (CHN)	29:31.78	Beijing, China	8 September 1993
Games Record	Sun Yingjie (CHN)	30:28.26	Busan, South Korea	8 October 2002

== Results ==
Legend

- DNF — Did not finish
- DNS — Did not start

Rank	Athlete	Time	Notes
1st place, gold medalist(s)	Alia Saeed Mohammed (UAE)	31:51.86	
2nd place, silver medalist(s)	Ding Changqin (CHN)	31:53.09	
3rd place, bronze medalist(s)	Ayumi Hagiwara (JPN)	31:55.67	
4	Sitora Hamidova (UZB)	32:12.54	
5	Jia Chaofeng (CHN)	32:21.74	
6	Eunice Chumba (BRN)	32:27.69	
7	Preeja Sreedharan (IND)	32:29.17	
8	Kasumi Nishihara (JPN)	32:41.49	
9	Bayartsogtyn Mönkhzayaa (MGL)	33:31.11	
10	Kim Do-yeon (KOR)	34:47.31	
11	Hyun Seo-yong (KOR)	35:06.35	
—	Tejitu Daba (BRN)	DNF	
—	Kanchhi Maya Koju (NEP)	DNS	
