= 2009 Asian Athletics Championships – Women's 5000 metres =

The women's 5000 metres event at the 2009 Asian Athletics Championships was held at the Guangdong Olympic Stadium on November 10.

== Results ==
Rank	Name	Nationality	Time	Notes
1st place, gold medalist(s)	Xue Fei	China	16:05.19	
2nd place, silver medalist(s)	Tejitu Daba	Bahrain	16:05.45	PB
3rd place, bronze medalist(s)	Kavita Raut	India	16:05.90	
4	Noriko Matsuoka	Japan	16:09.53	
5	Viktoriia Poliudina	Kyrgyzstan	16:21.58	PB
6	Shitaye Eshete	Bahrain	16:24.91	PB
7	Jhuma Khatun	India	17:13.10	
8	Battsetseg Baatarkhuu	Mongolia	17:29.90	
9	Melinder Kaur Ragbir Singh	Malaysia	17:57.70	
