= Athletics at the 2010 Asian Games – Women's 5000 metres =

Women's 5000 metres at the 2010 Asian Games
- Venue: Aoti Main Stadium
- Date: 26 November 2010
- Competitors: 12 from 7 nations

Medalists
gold medal	Mimi Belete	Bahrain
silver medal	Preeja Sreedharan	India
bronze medal	Kavita Raut	India

The women's 5000 metres event at the 2010 Asian Games was held at the Aoti Main Stadium, Guangzhou, China on 26 November 2010.

== Schedule ==
All times are China Standard Time (UTC+08:00)

Date	Time	Event
Friday, 26 November 2010	17:15	Final

== Records ==
Prior to this competition, the existing world, Asian and Games records were as follows.

World Record	Tirunesh Dibaba (ETH)	14:11.15	Beijing, China	6 June 2008
Asian Record	Jiang Bo (CHN)	14:28.09	Shanghai, China	23 October 1997
Games Record	Sun Yingjie (CHN)	14:40.41	Busan, South Korea	12 October 2002

== Results ==
Rank	Athlete	Time	Notes
1st place, gold medalist(s)	Mimi Belete (BRN)	15:15.59	
2nd place, silver medalist(s)	Preeja Sreedharan (IND)	15:15.89	
3rd place, bronze medalist(s)	Kavita Raut (IND)	15:16.54	
4	Kareema Saleh Jasim (BRN)	15:20.01	
5	Kayoko Fukushi (JPN)	15:25.08	
6	Viktoriia Poliudina (KGZ)	15:29.28	
7	Xue Fei (CHN)	15:44.09	
8	Ryoko Kizaki (JPN)	15:58.85	
9	Jia Chaofeng (CHN)	16:07.26	
10	Iuliia Arkhipova (KGZ)	16:47.42	
11	Kanchhi Maya Koju (NEP)	16:49.98	
12	Luvsanlkhündegiin Otgonbayar (MGL)	17:00.32	
