= Chiba International Cross Country =

Running competition in Chiba, Japan

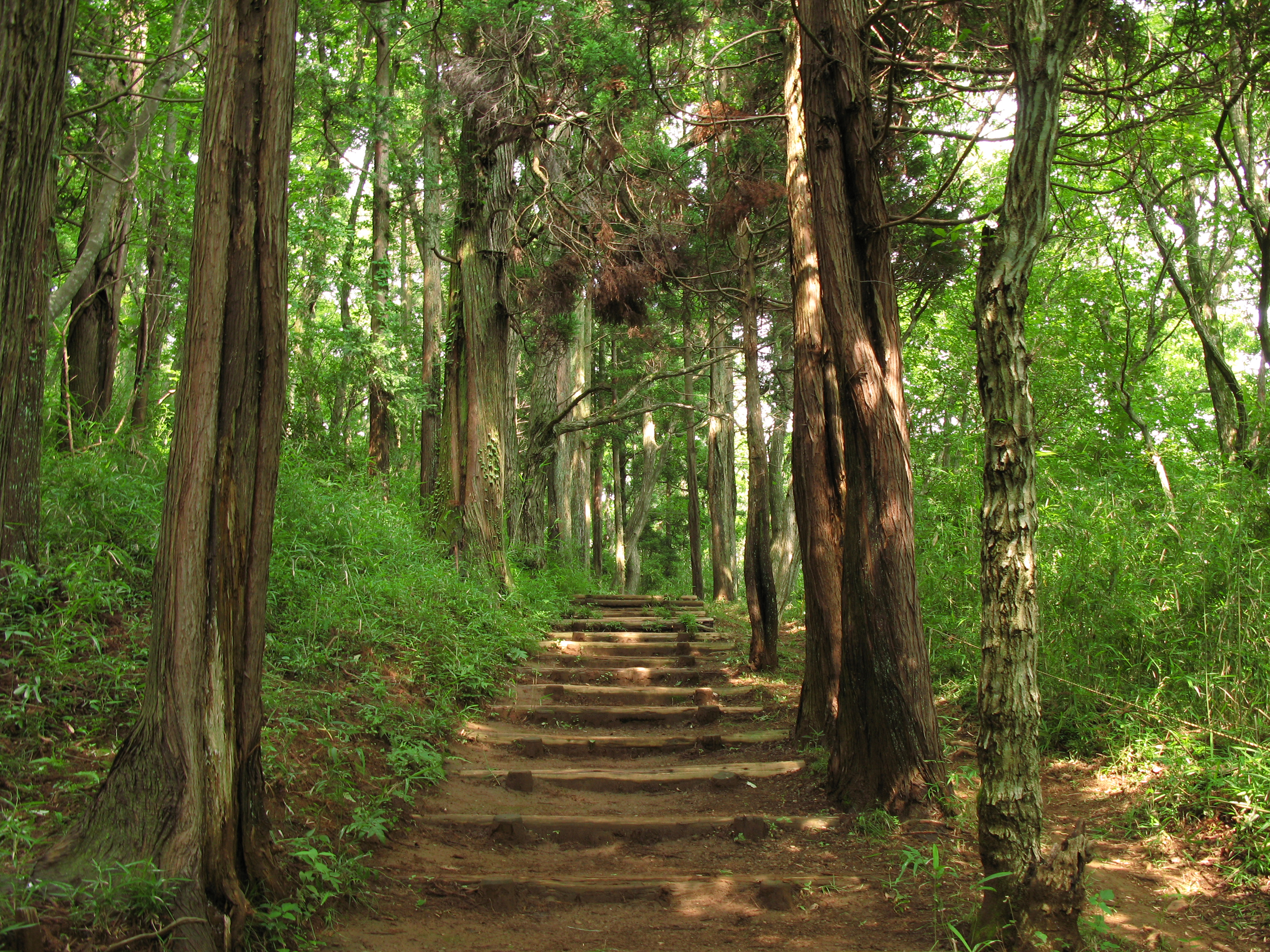
- The races are held in the Showa Forest near Chiba.
- Date: Mid-February
- Location: Chiba, Japan
- Event type: Cross country
- Distance: 12 km and 4 km for men 6 km for women 8 km junior men 5 km junior women
- Established: 1966

The Chiba International Cross Country is an annual cross country running competition which takes place in Chiba, Japan, in mid-February. It is one of the IAAF permit meetings which serve as qualifying events for the IAAF World Cross Country Championships.

Initiated in 1966, the Chiba Cross Country is held in Showa-No-Mori Park and features a competition schedule of eight races. These include a senior men's long course (12 km), a senior women's course (6 km), and a senior men's short course (4 km). Furthermore, there are three races for junior athletes which are of shorter distances, as well as two 3 km races for high school runners.

Four of the races act as qualifiers for the World Cross Country Championship: the men's 12 km and the women's 6 km allow athletes to enter the senior world competition while the junior men's 8 km and junior women's 5 km enable runners to qualify for the junior section of the championships. The competition is one of three in which Japanese athletes can qualify for the World Championships; the others being the annual Fukuoka International Cross Country and the biennial Asian Cross Country Championships.

Over a thousand runners compete at the meeting each year, although the attendance record set in 1991 featured nearly twice as many participants. A select number of international athletes are invited to compete each year, although the majority of the field typically comprise a mix of Japanese runners and Japan-based Kenyan athletes. Previous winners include Olympic gold medallists Samuel Wanjiru and Derartu Tulu, eight-time European cross country champion Serhiy Lebid, and Tegla Loroupe – twice winner of the New York City Marathon.

The competition is televised on the NHK BS-1 channel by the Japan Broadcasting Corporation, the country's public broadcaster. After the International Chiba Ekiden, the Chiba International Cross Country is the prefecture's premier athletics event.

The Chiba International Cross Country has also hosted the Asian Cross Country Championship race on two occasions (1995, 1997).

== Past senior race winners ==
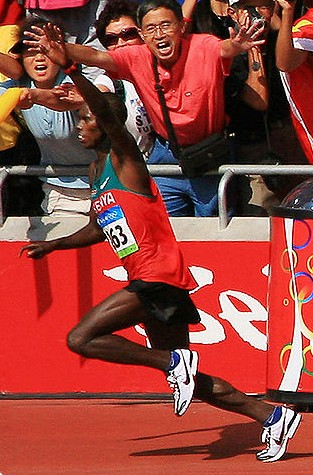
Two-time Chiba winner Samuel Wanjiru at the 2008 Beijing Olympics

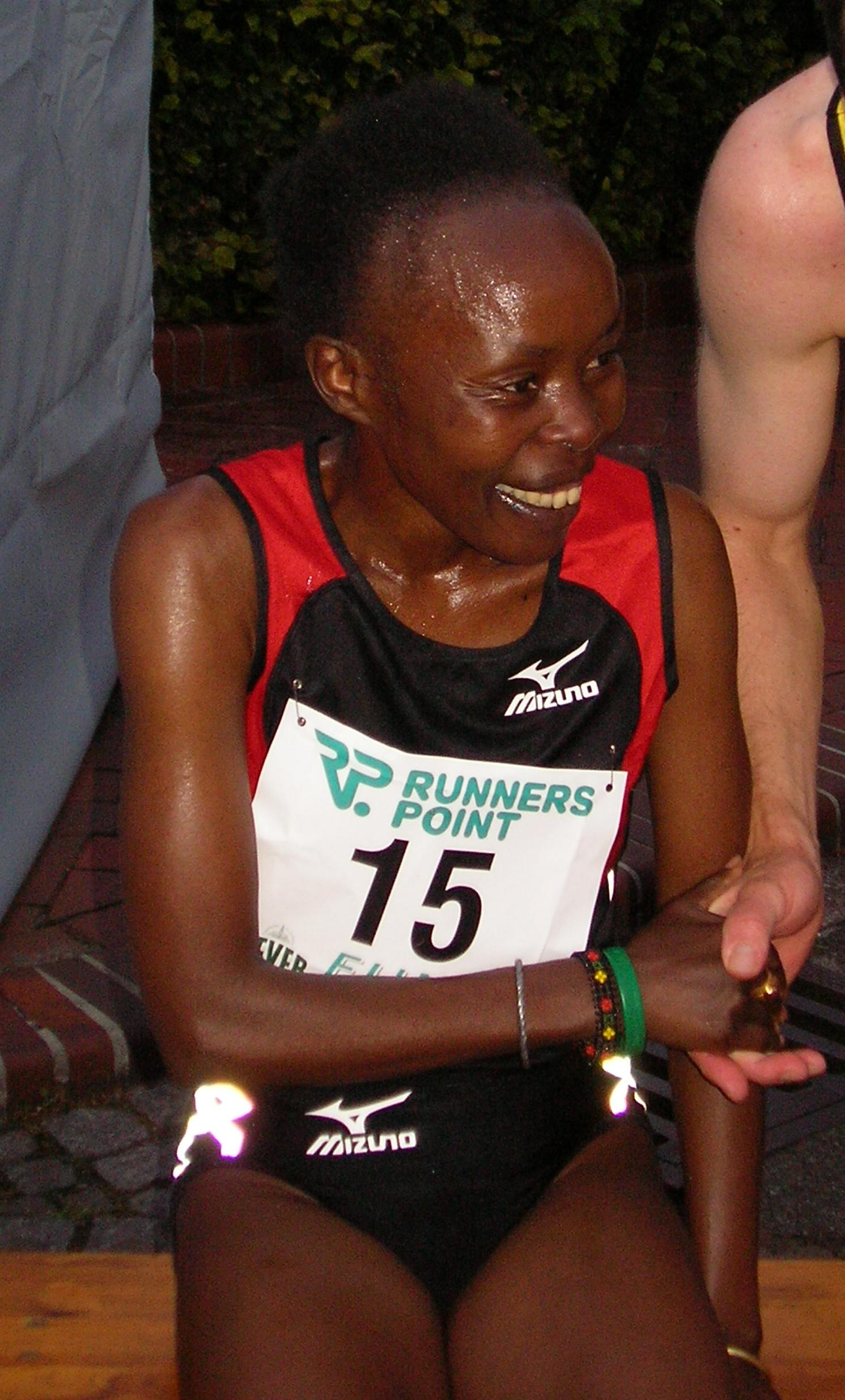
Tegla Loroupe won the women's race in 1997 and 1999.

- Note: Race data unavailable prior to 1987.

Key: Asian Championship race 8 km course (All other men's races 12 km and women's races 6 km)

Edition	Year	Men's winner	Time (m:s)	Women's winner	Time (m:s)
1st	1966	Not available	—	Not available	—
22nd	1987	Shuichi Yoneshige (JPN)	35:17	Jacqueline Perkins (AUS)	19:45
23rd	1988	Andrew Lloyd (AUS)	35:03	Carolyn Schuwalow (AUS)	21:19
24th	1989	Arturo Barrios (MEX)	34:28	Carolyn Schuwalow (AUS)	19:33
25th	1990	Brahim Boutayeb (MAR)	34:04	Carolyn Schuwalow (AUS)	19:01
26th	1991	Addis Abebe (ETH)	34:39	Derartu Tulu (ETH)	19:36
27th	1992	Thomas Osano (KEN)	35:03	Delilah Asiago (KEN)	19:24
28th	1993	Mathias Ntawulikura (RWA)	36:01	Viktoriya Nenasheva (RUS)	20:04
29th	1994	Gert Thys (RSA)	35:35	Nadezhda Galliamova (RUS)	19:25
30th	1995	Daniel Njenga (KEN)	35:32	Tudorita Chidu (ROU)	19:17
31st	1996	Brad Barquist (USA)	36:37	Iulia Olteanu (ROU)	20:05
32nd	1997	Mathias Ntawulikura (RWA)	35:50	Tegla Loroupe (KEN)	19:55
33rd	1998	Julius Gitahi (KEN)	36:32	Sally Barsosio (KEN)	20:37
34th	1999	Julius Kiptoo (KEN)	35:14	Tegla Loroupe (KEN)	26:00
35th	2000	Serhiy Lebid (UKR)	35:38	Yoshiko Ichikawa (JPN)	26:53
36th	2001	Samuel Kabiru (KEN)	23:33	Iulia Olteanu (ROU)	19:26
37th	2002	Craig Mottram (AUS)	35:29	Benita Johnson (AUS)	25:43
38th	2003	Ricardo Ribas (POR)	36:27	Benita Johnson (AUS)	26:09
39th	2004	Samuel Wanjiru (KEN)	35:04	Benita Johnson (AUS)	18:38
40th	2005	Samuel Wanjiru (KEN)	34:54	Miwako Yamanaka (JPN)	20:01
41st	2006	Ryan Hall (USA)	35:22	Sara Hall (USA)	19:12
42nd	2007	Joseph Gitau (KEN)	35:05	Anália Rosa (POR)	19:15
43rd	2008	Harun Mbugua (KEN)	35:27	Lucy Wangui (KEN)	19:50
44th	2009	Bedan Karoki (KEN)	34:40	Yuko Shimizu (JPN)	19:38
45th	2010	Bedan Karoki (KEN)	34:52	Misaki Katsumata (JPN)	19:39
46th	2011	Bedan Karoki (KEN)	33:58	Hitomi Niiya (JPN)	25:53
47th	2012	Charles Ndirangu (KEN)	34:59	Susan Wairimu (KEN)	26:41
48th	2013	Charles Ndirangu (KEN)	35:01	Rosemary Wanjiru (KEN)	26:08
49th	2014	cancelled due to snow storms			
50th	2015	Charles Ndirangu (KEN)	36:14	Zoe Buckman (AUS)	28:37
51st	2016	Rodgers Kwemoi (KEN)	25:05	Yuki Kanehira (JPN)	29:04
