= Bedan Karoki Muchiri =

Kenyan long-distance runner (born 1990)

Bedan Karoki
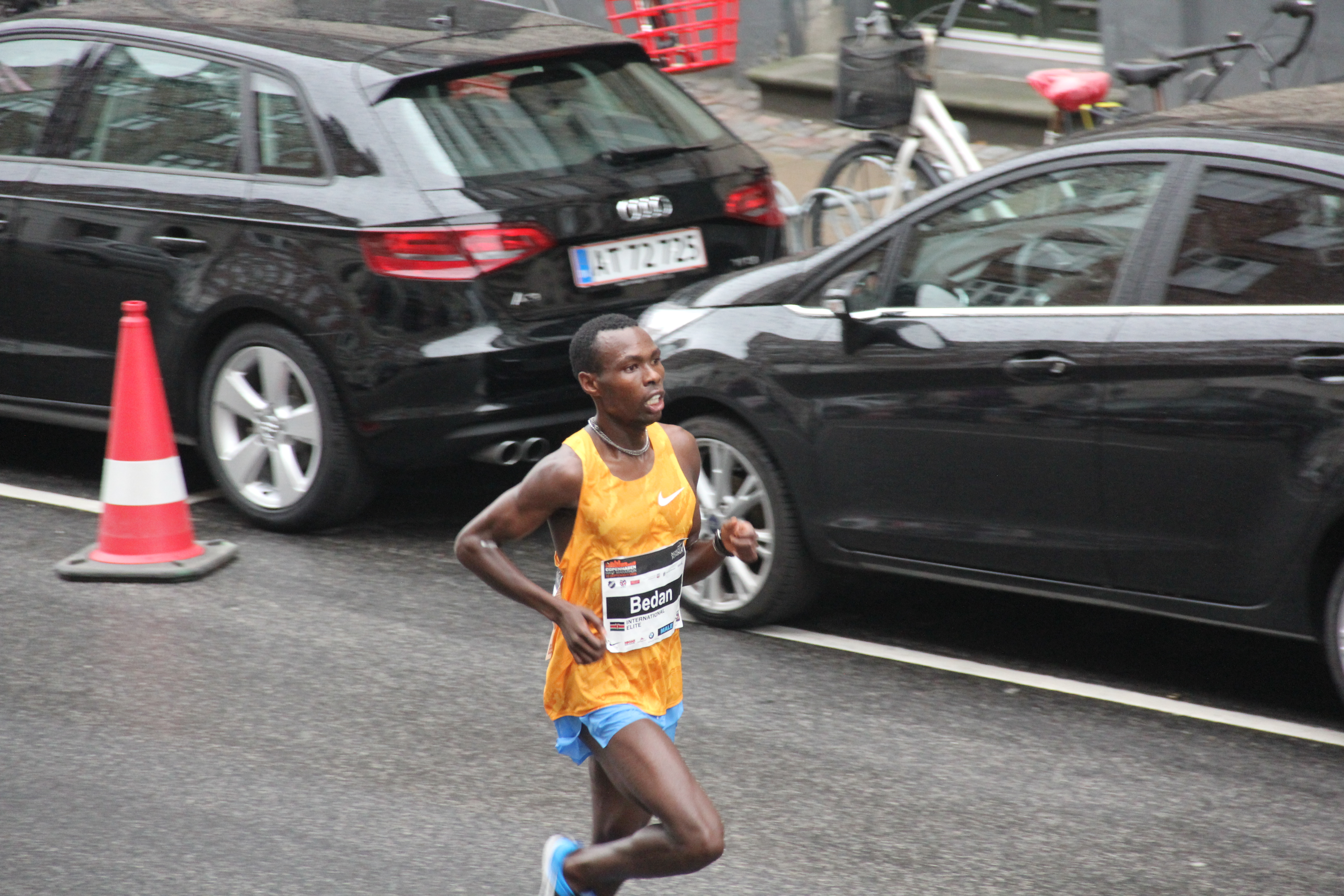
- Karoki at the 2015 Copenhagen Half Marathon

Personal information
- Full name: Bedan Karoki Muchiri
- Nationality: Kenya
- Born: 21 August 1990 (age 35) Nyandarua
- Height: 1.67 m (5 ft 5 1/2 in)
- Weight: 65 kg (143 lb)

Sport
- Sport: Men's athletics
- Events: 10,000 metres, half marathon, cross country

Achievements and titles
- Personal bests: 5,000 m: 13:15.25 (Kitami 2014); 10,000 m: 26:52.12 (London 2017)
Medal record
All-Africa Games
Silver medal – second place	2011 Maputo	10,000 m
IAAF World Cross Country Championships
Silver medal – second place	2015 Guiyang	Senior race
IAAF World Half Marathon Championships
Gold medal – first place	2016 Cardiff	Team
Silver medal – second place	2016 Cardiff	Individual

Bedan Karoki Muchiri (born 21 August 1990) is a Kenyan professional long distance runner who competes in track, cross country and road running disciplines. He represented Kenya at the 2012 and 2016 Summer Olympics.

He was a silver medallist at the 2015 IAAF World Cross Country Championships and the 2016 IAAF World Half Marathon Championships, and also in the 10,000 m at the 2011 All-Africa Games. His half marathon best of 58:42 minutes ranks him in the all-time top ten for the distance.

== Career ==
Bedan Karoki Muchiri was born in Nyandarua. Muchiri attended Muthiga and Kagondo primary schools in Kenya and joined the Mt.Kenya Talents Development Centre, before going on to study in Japan. He graduated from high school there and attained a high level of proficiency in Japanese. Karoki spent much of his early career running on the Japanese racing circuit, including wins at the Chiba International Cross Country three years in a row, from 2009 to 2011. He also won the Fukuoka International Cross Country in 2011.

He had his first international call-up for Kenya and won a silver medal in the 10,000 m at the 2011 All-Africa Games in Maputo, despite losing the trials and eventually gaining selection as a wildcard entry.

He won his place on the Kenyan Olympic team by finishing third behind Wilson Kiprop and Moses Masai at the Kenyan Olympic Trials in Eugene, Oregon, which were held during the Prefontaine Classic. He finished fifth in the 10,000 metres at the 2012 Olympics in a time of 27:32.94, the highest finishing Kenyan in the race.

In 2013, he won the Kenyan trials then placed sixth in the 10,000 meters at the 2013 World Championships in Athletics.

In 2014, he competed in his first American road race, winning the Beach to Beacon 10K in 27:36. Later he won the Rock 'n' Roll Philadelphia Half Marathon in 59:23.

Karoki placed second at the 2015 IAAF World Cross Country Championships behind countryman Geoffrey Kipsang after leading for much of the race. He represented Kenya in the 10,000 m at the 2015 World Championships in Athletics and narrowly missed out on a medal in fourth place. Medals came at the 2016 IAAF World Half Marathon Championships, where he was runner-up to compatriot Geoffrey Kipsang Kamworor and shared in the team title.

He is the Ambassador for The Mt. Kenya Talents Development Centre.

In 2017 Muchiri competed in the 2017 London Marathon where he finished in a time of 2:07:41 behind Ethiopian Kenenisa Bekele and Kenyan counterpart Daniel Wanjiru.

== International competitions ==
Year	Competition	Venue	Position	Event	Notes
2011	All-Africa Games	Maputo, Mozambique	2nd	10,000 m	28:19.22
2012	Olympic Games	London, United Kingdom	5th	10,000 m	27:32.94
2013	World Championships	Moscow, Russia	6th	10,000 m	27:27.17
2015	World Cross Country Championships	Guiyang, China	2nd	Senior race	35:00
2015	World Cross Country Championships	Guiyang, China	2nd	Senior team	20 pts
2015	World Championships	Beijing, China	4th	10,000 m	27:04.77
2016	World Half Marathon Championships	Cardiff, United Kingdom	2nd	Half Marathon	59:36
2016	World Half Marathon Championships	Cardiff, United Kingdom	1st	Team	2:58:58
2016	Olympic Games	Rio de Janeiro, Brazil	7th	10,000 m	27:22.93
2017	World Championships	London, United Kingdom	4th	10,000 m	26:52.12

== National titles ==
- Kenyan Cross Country Championships
  - 12 km: 2012, 2014, 2015
- Kenyan World Championships Trials
  - 10,000 metres: 2013
- Japan Championships in Athletics
  - 5000 metres: 2009, 2011
- Japanese Corporate Championships
  - 5000 metres: 2012

== Circuit wins ==
- Copenhagen Half Marathon: 2015
- Philadelphia Half Marathon: 2014
- Gifu Seiryu Half Marathon: 2014
- Lisbon Half Marathon: 2014
- Beach to Beacon 10K: 2014
- World's Best 10K: 2014, 2016
- Discovery Kenya Cross Country: 2016
- Fukuoka International Cross Country: 2011
- Chiba International Cross Country: 2009, 2010, 2011
- Ras Al Khaimah Half Marathon: 2017, 2018
- Buenos Aires Half Marathon: 2019

== Personal bests ==
- 1500 metres – 3:42.1 (2016)
- 3000 metres – 7:37.68 (2013)
- 5000 metres – 13:15.25 (2014)
- 10,000 metres – 26:52.12 (2017)
- 10K run – 27:37 (2014)
- Half marathon – 58:42 (2018)
- Marathon – 02:05:53 (2019)

Info from All Athletics
