= 2013 Asian Athletics Championships – Women's 10,000 metres =

The women's 10,000 metres at the 2013 Asian Athletics Championships was held at the Shree Shiv Chhatrapati Sports Complex on 3 July.

== Results ==
| Rank | Name | Nationality | Time | Notes |
|---|---|---|---|---|
| 1st place, gold medalist(s) | Shitaye Eshete | Bahrain | 32:17.29 | CR |
| 2nd place, silver medalist(s) | Alia Saeed Mohammed | United Arab Emirates | 32:39.39 | |
| 3rd place, bronze medalist(s) | Ayumi Hagiwara | Japan | 32:47.44 | |
| 4 | Preeja Sreedharan | India | 33:41.97 | |
| 5 | Sitora Khamidova | Uzbekistan | 33:59.87 | |
| 6 | Gulzhanet Zhanatbek | Kazakhstan | 34:13.81 | |
| 7 | Suriya Loganathan | India | 34:43.63 | |
| 8 | Monika Athare | India | 34:44.38 | |
| 9 | Kareema Saleh Jasim | Bahrain | 34:45.06 | |
| 10 | Kim Chun Mi | North Korea | 35:06.97 | |
| 11 | Kim Son Hui | North Korea | 35:31.32 | |
| 12 | Viktoriia Poliudina | Kyrgyzstan | 35:56.64 | |
