= Fukuoka International Cross Country =

Cross country running competition in Japan

- Date: Late February or early March
- Location: Fukuoka, Japan
- Event type: Cross country
- Distance: 10 km for men 4 km for women 8 km junior men 6 km junior women
- Established: 1987

The Fukuoka International Cross Country is an annual cross country running competition which takes place in Fukuoka, Japan in either late February or Early March. It is one of the IAAF permit meetings which serve as qualifying events for the IAAF World Cross Country Championships.

First held in 1987, the Fukuoka Cross Country is held at the National Cross Country Course near the Uminonakamichi Seaside Park in Higashi-ku, Fukuoka. The course is a purpose-built cross country venue that was created as the host course for the 2006 IAAF World Cross Country Championships.

The meet features a competition schedule of eight races. These include a senior men's course (10 km) and a senior women's course (6 km). A total of four junior races take place, with long courses of 8 km for men and 6 km for women, as well as 4 km short course for both junior sexes. Furthermore, there are two relay races for high school athletes which have legs of 2 km per runner.

Four of the races act as qualifiers for the World Cross Country Championship: the men's 10 km and the women's 6 km allow athletes to enter the senior world competition while the junior men's 8 km and junior women's 6 km enable runners to qualify for the junior section of the championships. The competition is one of three in which Japanese athletes can qualify for the World Championships; the others being the annual Chiba International Cross Country and the biennial Asian Cross Country Championships.

A small contingent of foreign athletes are invited each year, but the fields of each race largely comprise Japanese runners. Previous winners include Olympic gold medallist Samuel Wanjiru, who first won at the age of 16, and won three times consecutively between 2003 and 2005. World and Olympic gold medallist Meseret Defar has also competed, winning the 2005 women's race.

The competition is televised on local Japan News Network channels by the Tokyo Broadcasting System. The Fukuoka Cross Country meeting is one of the prefecture's top annual athletics events, along with the Fukuoka International Open Marathon Championship.

== Past senior race winners ==
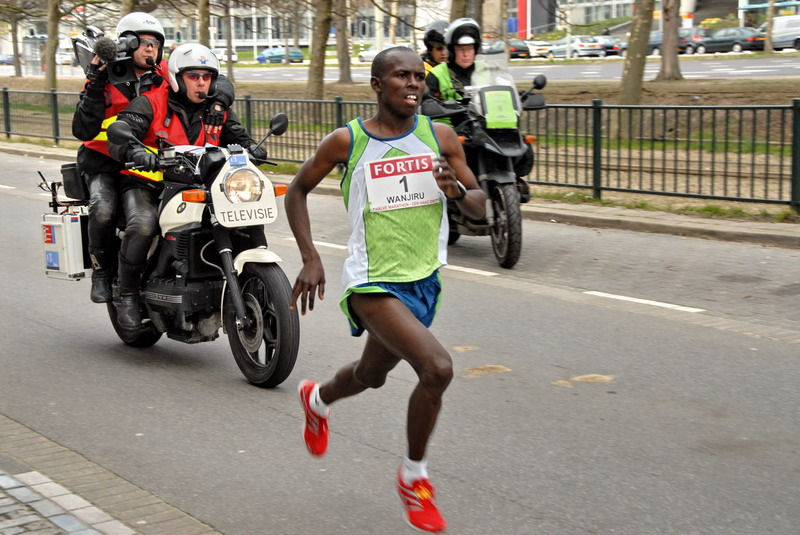
Kenyan Samuel Wanjiru first won at age 16 in 2003

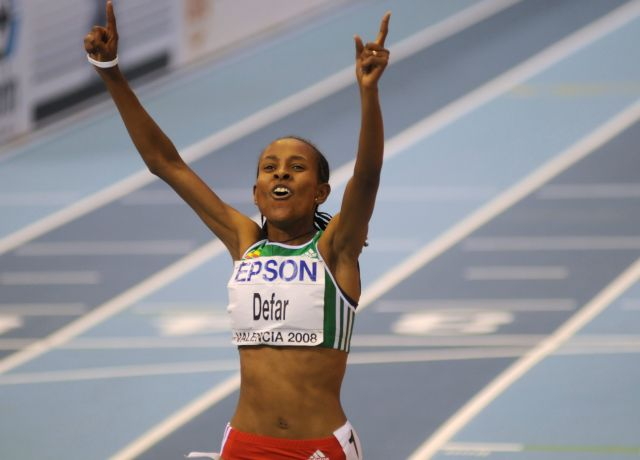
Meseret Defar was the 2005 women's champion

Key: Asian Championship race

- Note: Race data unavailable prior to 1995.

Edition	Year	Men's winner	Time (m:s)	Women's winner	Time (m:s)
1st	1987	Not available	—	Not available	—
10th	1996	Jeff Schiebler (CAN)	29:42	Liu Shixiang (PRC)	16:18
11th	1997	Jeff Schiebler (CAN)	28:44	Takami Ominami (JPN)	16:08
12th	1998	Julius Gitahi (KEN)	28:43	Yuko Kawakami (JPN)	16:16
13th	1999	Jeff Schiebler (CAN)	29:00	Kylie Risk (AUS)	16:09
14th	2000	Tomohiro Seto (JPN)	29:33	Iulia Olteanu (ROU)	16:40
15th	2001	Yoji Yamaguchi (JPN)	30:41	Iulia Olteanu (ROU)	16:40
16th	2002	Samuel Kabiru (KEN)	28:50	Miwako Yamanaka (JPN)	15:36
17th	2003	Samuel Wanjiru (KEN)	29:13	Émilie Mondor (CAN)	18:51
18th	2004	Samuel Wanjiru (KEN)	29:02	Yoshiko Ichikawa (JPN)	19:25
19th	2005	Samuel Wanjiru (KEN)	29:20	Meseret Defar (ETH)	19:16
20th	2006	Kazuyoshi Tokumoto (JPN)	30:27	Kayoko Fukushi (JPN)	19:38
21st	2007	Micah Njeru (KEN)	29:29	Megumi Kinukawa (JPN)	19:56
22nd	2008	Paul Kuira (KEN)	28:18	Mariya Konovalova (RUS)	18:54
23rd	2009	Joseph Kiptoo Birech (KEN)	29:15	Kseniya Agafonova (RUS)	19:33
24th	2010	Tetsuya Yoroizaka (JPN)	29:04	Kazue Kojima (JPN)	19:32
25th	2011	Bidan Karoki (KEN)	27:52	Hitomi Niiya (JPN)	19:09
26th	2012	Suguru Osako (JPN)	30:27	Hitomi Niiya (JPN)	20:18
27th	2013	Charles Ndirangu (KEN)	29:47	Hitomi Niiya (JPN)	20:00
28th	2014	Karemi Thuku (KEN)	28:43	Tejitu Daba (BHR)	19:23
29th	2015	Jonathan Ndiku (KEN)	29:22	Mai Shoji (JPN)	19:54
