= 2011 Asian Athletics Championships – Women's 5000 metres =

The women's 5000 metres at the 2011 Asian Athletics Championships was held at the Kobe Universiade Memorial Stadium on 9 July.

== Results ==
Rank	Name	Nationality	Time	Notes
1st place, gold medalist(s)	Tejitu Daba Chalchissa	Bahrain	15:22.48	CR
2nd place, silver medalist(s)	Hitomi Niiya	Japan	15:34.19	
3rd place, bronze medalist(s)	Yuriko Kobayashi	Japan	15:42.59	SB
4	Alia Mohammed Saeed	United Arab Emirates	15:52.07	
5	Betlhem Desalegn	United Arab Emirates	16:04.98	
6	Triyaningsih	Indonesia	16:05.18	
7	Rei Ohara	Japan	16:21.23	
8	Kavita Raut	India	16:23.06	
9	Suriya Loganathan	India	17:19.44	
10	Leila Ebrahimymojavery	Iran	17:40.01	NR
	Mahboubeh Ghayournajafabadi	Iran	DNS	
