= 2017 Asian Athletics Championships – Women's 5000 metres =

The women's 5000 metres at the 2017 Asian Athletics Championships was held on 6 July.

== Results ==
Rank	Name	Nationality	Time	Notes
1st place, gold medalist(s)	Darya Maslova	Kyrgyzstan	15:57.95	
2nd place, silver medalist(s)	Alia Mohammed Saeed	United Arab Emirates	15:59.95	
3rd place, bronze medalist(s)	Sanjivani Jadhav	India	16:00.24	
4	Loganathan Suriya	India	16:01.96	
5	Ryo Koido	Japan	16:11.15	
6	Son Hui	North Korea	16:30.07	
7	Deng Qiaoling	China	17:53.88	
8	Aprilia Kartina	Indonesia	18:29.23	

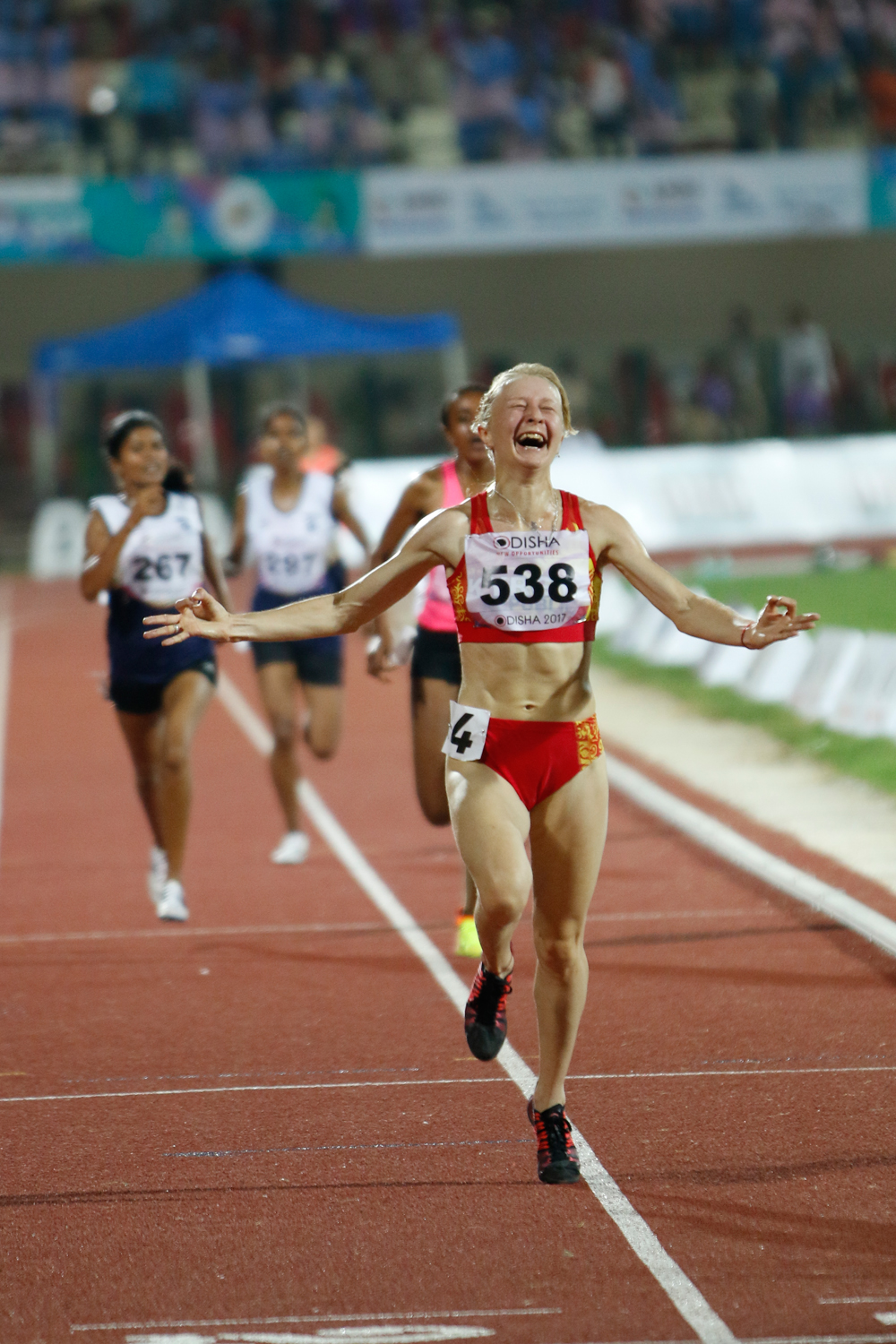
Darya Maslova wins the race
