= Mari Ozaki =

Japanese long-distance runner

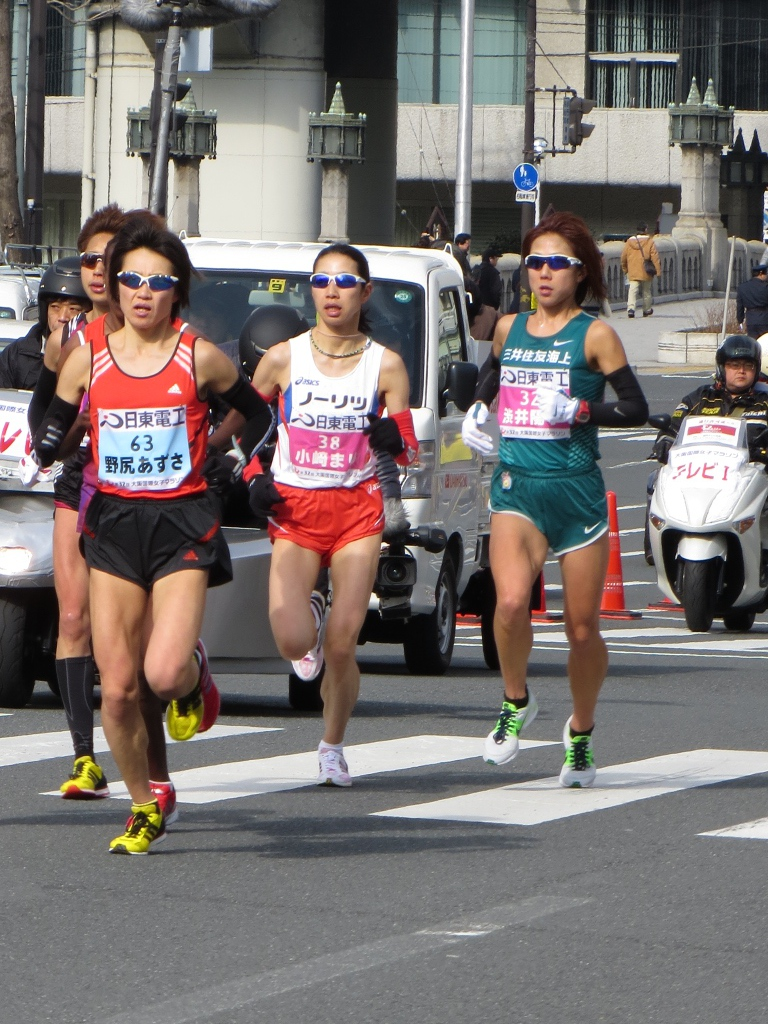
Mari Ozaki in international Ladies Marathon 2013.

Mari Ozaki (小崎まり, Ozaki Mari; born 16 July 1975 in Hirakata, Osaka) is a Japanese long-distance runner who specializes in the marathon race.

She was the 2002 winner of the Kagawa Marugame Half Marathon, taking the title in 1:09:33. She ran at the 2010 London Marathon and finished in ninth place with a time of 2:25:43.

== Competition record ==
Year	Competition	Venue	Position	Event	Notes
Representing Japan
2001	East Asian Games	Osaka, Japan	3rd	5,000 m	15:47.02
2001	World Championships	Edmonton, Canada	19th	10,000 m	32:39.17
2003	Japan Championships	Yokohama, Japan	1st	5,000 m	
2005	World Championships	Helsinki, Finland	15th	Marathon	2:30:28
2007	World Championships	Osaka, Japan	14th	Marathon	2:35:04
2008	Kagawa Marugame Half Marathon	Marugame, Japan	3rd	Half Marathon	1:09:58
2009	Asian Championships	Guangzhou, China	5th	10,000 m	34:29.89
2010	London Marathon	London, United Kingdom	9th	Marathon	2:25:43

== Personal bests ==
- 5000 metres - 15:12.76 min (2003)
- 10,000 metres - 31:34.15 min (2005)
- Half marathon - 1:09:33 hrs (2002)
- Marathon - 2:23:30 hrs (2003)
