= 2017 Asian Athletics Championships – Women's 10,000 metres =

The women's 10,000 metres at the 2017 Asian Athletics Championships was held on 9 July.

== Results ==
Rank	Name	Nationality	Time	Notes
1st place, gold medalist(s)	Darya Maslova	Kyrgyzstan	32:21.21	
2nd place, silver medalist(s)	Yuka Hori	Japan	32:23.26	
3rd place, bronze medalist(s)	Mizuki Matsuda	Japan	32:46.61	
4	Loganathan Suriya	India	33:04.10	
5	Sanjivani Jadhav	India	33:28.35	
6	He Yinli	China	34:27.14	
6	Meenu	India	35:25.73	
	Alia Mohammed Saeed	United Arab Emirates	DNF	

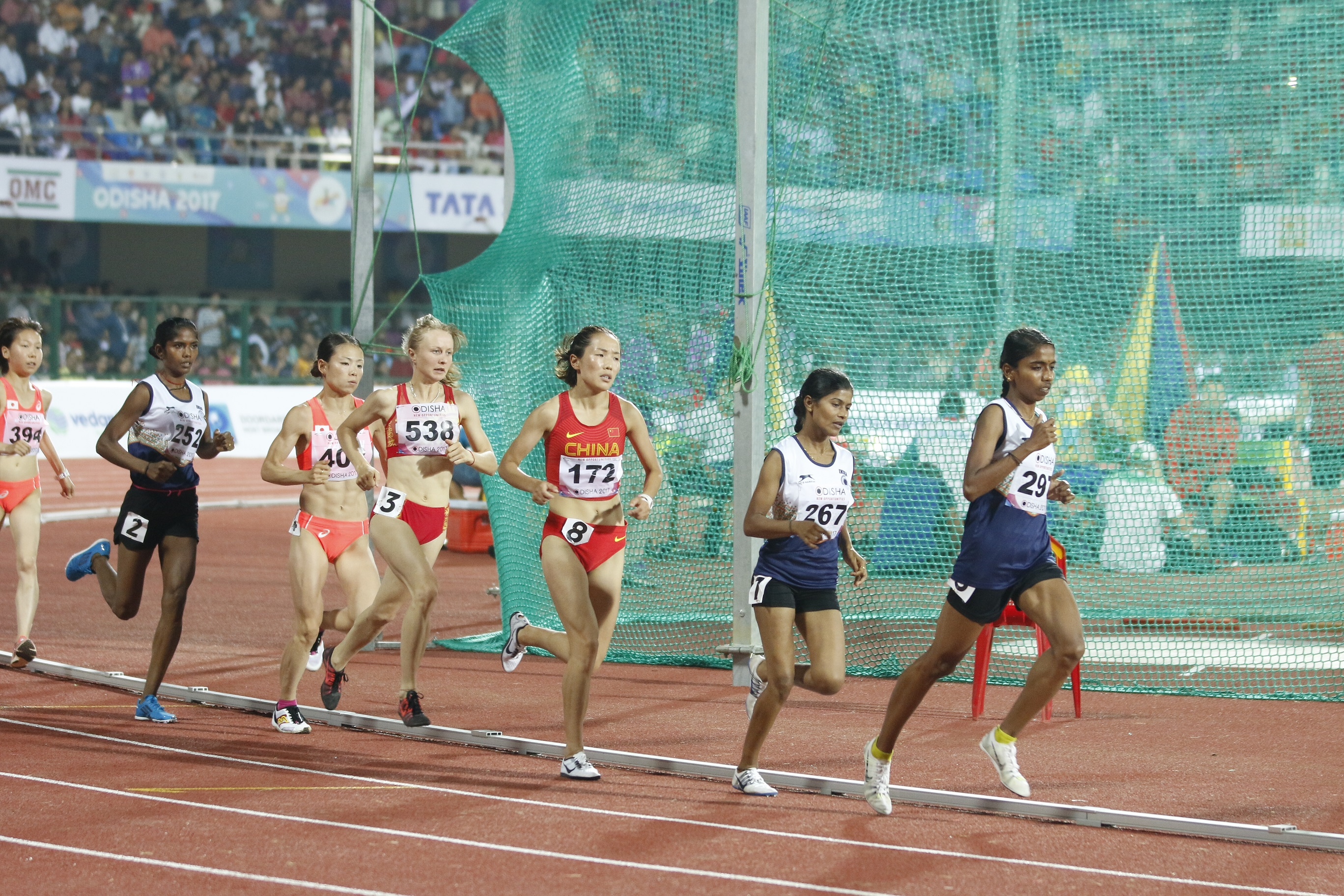
The race underway
