= Athletics at the 1995 Summer Universiade – Women's 10,000 metres =

The women's 10,000 metres event at the 1995 Summer Universiade was held on 1 September at the Hakatanomori Athletic Stadium in Fukuoka, Japan.

== Results ==
Rank	Athlete	Nationality	Time	Notes
1st place, gold medalist(s)	Iulia Negură	Romania	32:28.25	
2nd place, silver medalist(s)	Camelia Tecuţă	Romania	32:43.38	
3rd place, bronze medalist(s)	Yasuko Kimura	Japan	33:03.01	
4	Ai Mitsukawa	Japan	33:16.41	
5	Milka Mihaylova	Bulgaria	33:25.68	
6	Louise Watson	Great Britain	33:33.71	
7	Rachel Sauder	United States	35:00.73	
8	Missy McCleary	Canada	36:00.96	
9	Michelle King	Canada	36:16.78	
