= Sanjivani Jadhav =

Indian long-distance runner

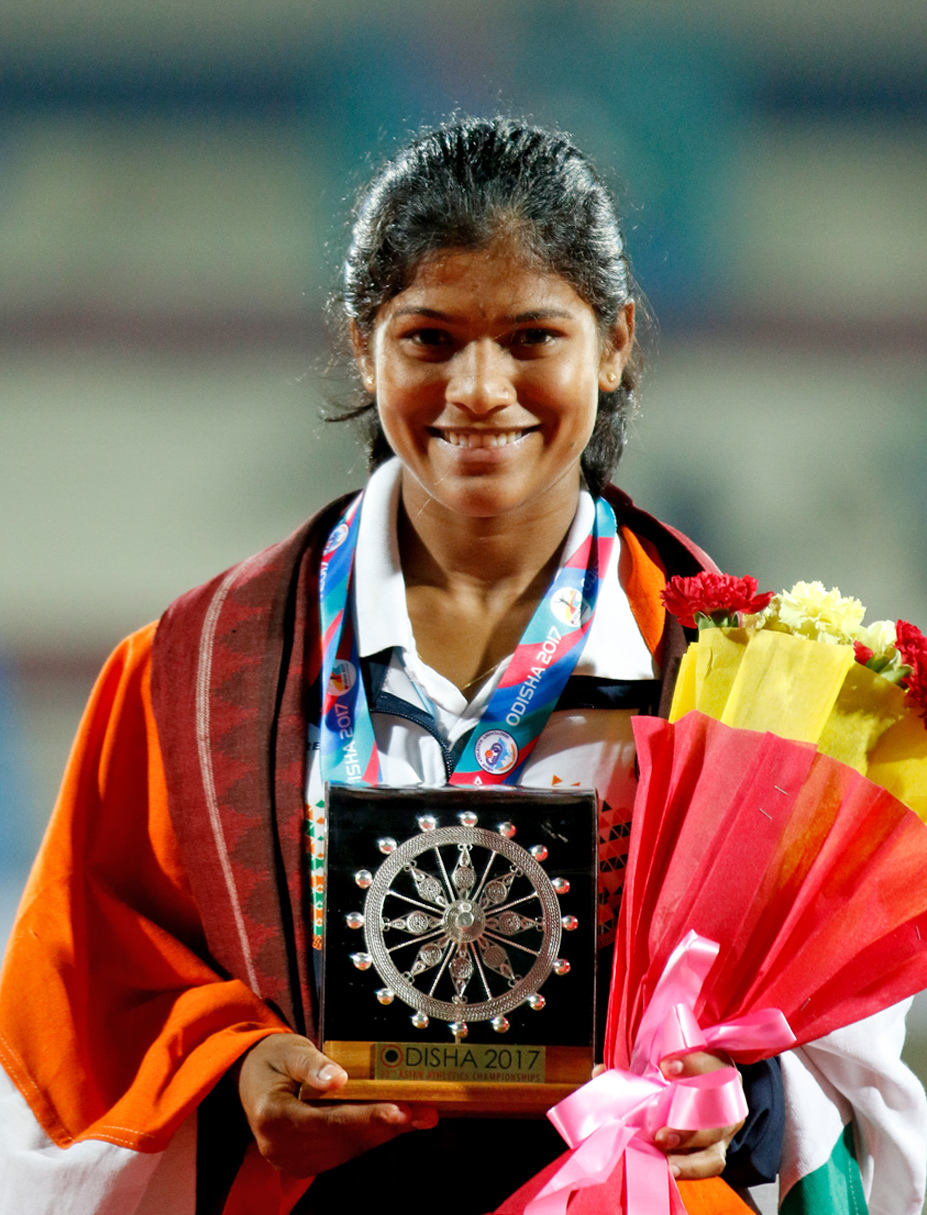
- at the 2017 Asian Athletics Championships

Personal information
- Nationality: Indian
- Born: 12 July 1996 (age 29) Nashik, Maharashtra, India
- Education: University of Pune
- Height: 1.54 m (5 ft 1 in)
- Weight: 38 kg (84 lb)

Sport
- Sport: Athletics
- Event(s): 5000 m, 10,000 m
Medal record
Women's athletics
Representing India
Asian Championships
Bronze medal – third place	2017 Bhubaneswar	5000 m
Asian Indoor and Martial Arts Games
Silver medal – second place	2017 Ashgabat	3000 m
Universiade
Silver medal – second place	2017 Taipei	10000m
Asian Cross Country Championships
Bronze medal – third place	2018 Guiyang	Senior Race
Asian Junior Championships
Bronze medal – third place	2014 Taipei	3000m
Bronze medal – third place	2019 Doha	10,000 m

Sanjivani Baburao Jadhav (born 12 July 1996) is an Indian long-distance athlete at 5000m and 10,000m. She had won a bronze medal at 5000m at the 2017 Asian Athletics Championships.

== Life ==
Jadhav was born in Nashik which is a city in Maharashtra. She attended Bhonsala Military College where she combined her ambition for sport with that of becoming a civil servant. She had initially tried her hand in wrestling and even participated in National level tournaments before taking the plunge to track and field after coach Vijender Singh convinced her parents. She was identified as an outstanding athlete and supported by SportsNest who nurture sports athletes. In 2013 she won three medals at the 1st Asian School Athletics Meet. She came second in the 2016 Delhi marathon.

She is coached by Vijender Singh who trained Kavita Raut. In 2017 she won a bronze medal at the Asian Athletic games in Odisha during the 2017 Asian Athletics Championships – Women's 5000 metres. She was fifth in the Women's 10,000 metre at the same event. In 2018 she took a bronze medal in the 8 km event as part of the Asian Cross Country Championships in Guiyang. The gold and silver were taken by Li Dan of China and Japanese Abe Yukari.

In 2018, she has received the Shiv Chhatrapati Award from the Government of Maharashtra.
