= Kim Mi-gyong =

North Korean runner (born 1991)

Personal information
- Born: October 17, 1991 (age 34) South Hwanghae Province
- Height: 1.6 m (5 ft 3 in)
- Weight: 50 kg (110 lb)

Sport
- Country: North Korea
- Sport: Athletics
- Event: Marathon

Korean name
- Hangul: 김미경
- RR: Gim Migyeong
- MR: Kim Migyŏng
Medal record
Women's athletics
Representing North Korea
Asian Championships
Bronze medal – third place	2007 Amman	5000 m
Bronze medal – third place	2007 Amman	10,000 m

Kim Mi-gyong (Korean: 김미경; born 17 October 1991) is a North Korean long-distance runner. She competed in the marathon at the 2012 Summer Olympics, placing 74th with a time of 2:38:33.

At the age of fifteen she represented her country at the 2007 Asian Athletics Championships and secured a bronze medal double in the 5000 metres and 10,000 metres events. Her next international outings came in 2009 when she placed sixth in the half marathon at the Summer Universiade and fifth in the same event at the East Asian Games.

Kim made her debut in the marathon in 2011, running at the Macau Marathon and finishing tenth with a time of 2:38:36 hours. Her run at the 2012 Pyongyang Marathon brought her up to the elite standard, as she won the race with a personal best of 2:30:41 hours. This run earned her a place on the North Korean team for the 2012 Summer Olympics, where she placed 74th overall in the women's Olympic marathon. A return to Pyongyang in 2013 saw her rise to the top of the national team with a second win at the race with a time of 2:26:32, ranking her third on the North Korean all-time lists.
