= 2007 Asian Athletics Championships – Women's 10,000 metres =

Asian Women Athletics Championships

The women's 10,000 metres event at the 2007 Asian Athletics Championships was held in Amman, Jordan on July 25.

== Results ==
Rank	Name	Nationality	Time	Notes
1st place, gold medalist(s)	Kareema Saleh Jasim	Bahrain	34:26.39	
2nd place, silver medalist(s)	Preeja Sreedharan	India	36:04.54	
3rd place, bronze medalist(s)	Kim Mi-Gyong	North Korea	38:29.90	
