= Athletics at the 2011 All-Africa Games – Men's 10,000 metres =

The men's 10,000 metres event at the 2011 All-Africa Games was held on 12 September.

== Results ==
| Rank | Name | Nationality | Time | Notes |
|---|---|---|---|---|
| 1st place, gold medalist(s) | Ibrahim Jeilan | Ethiopia | 28:18.22 | |
| 2nd place, silver medalist(s) | Bedan Karuki Muchiri | Kenya | 28:19.22 | |
| 3rd place, bronze medalist(s) | Azmeraw Bekele | Ethiopia | 28:19.32 | |
| 4 | Kennet Kipkemoi | Kenya | 28:20.61 | |
| 5 | Dino Sefer | Ethiopia | 28:23.40 | |
| 6 | Negusse Ameleson | Eritrea | 28.46.03 | |
| 7 | Jean Marie Uwajeneza | Rwanda | 29:08.04 | |
| 8 | Alphonce Simbu | Tanzania | 29:58.20 | |
| | Rethabile Molefi | Lesotho | DNF | |
| | Nayel Suliman | Sudan | DNF | |
