= Viktoriia Poliudina =

Kyrgyzstani runner (born 1989)

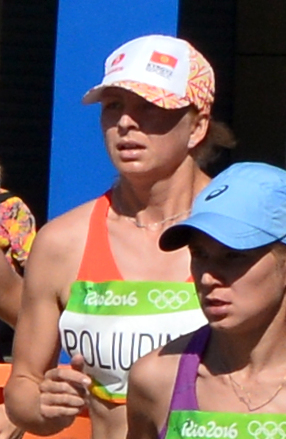

Personal information
- Born: 29 June 1989 (age 37) Karakol, Kyrgyzstan
- Height: 1.65 m (5 ft 5 in)
- Weight: 55 kg (121 lb)

Sport
- Sport: Track and field
- Events: 1500 m, 5000 m, 10,000 m
Medal record
Women's athletics
Representing Kyrgyzstan
Asian Indoor Championships
| Gold medal – first place | 2010 Tehran | 1500 m |
| Gold medal – first place | 2010 Tehran | 3000 m |

Viktoriia Poliudina (Russian: Виктория Полюдина; born 29 June 1989) is a Kyrgyzstani athlete competing in the middle- and long-distance events. She represented her country at one indoor and two outdoor World Championships.

== Competition record ==
| Year | Competition | Venue | Position | Event | Notes |
Representing Kyrgyzstan
| 2008 | Asian Junior Championships | Jakarta, Indonesia | 3rd | 1500 m | 4:31.45 |
| 2008 | Asian Junior Championships | Jakarta, Indonesia | 3rd | 3000 m | 9:41.21 |
| 2008 | World Junior Championships | Bydgoszcz, Poland | 18th (h) | 1500 m | 4:26.03 |
| 2009 | World Championships | Berlin, Germany | – | Marathon | DNF |
| 2009 | Asian Championships | Guangzhou, China | 5th | 5000 m | 16:21.58 |
| 2009 | Asian Championships | Guangzhou, China | 6th | 10,000 m | 34:33.86 |
| 2010 | Asian Indoor Championships | Tehran, Iran | 1st | 1500 m | 4:29.65 |
| 2010 | Asian Indoor Championships | Tehran, Iran | 1st | 3000 m | 9:39.35 |
| 2010 | World Indoor Championships | Doha, Qatar | 21st (h) | 3000 m | 9:30.76 |
| 2010 | Asian Games | Guangzhou, China | 6th | 5000 m | 15:29.28 |
| 2010 | Asian Games | Guangzhou, China | 6th | 10,000 m | 32:16.34 |
| 2011 | World Championships | Daegu, South Korea | 21st (h) | 5000 m | 16:32.68 |
| 2013 | Asian Championships | Pune, India | 12th | 5000 m | 16:57.85 |
| 2013 | Asian Championships | Pune, India | 12th | 10,000 m | 35:56.64 |
| 2014 | Asian Indoor Championships | Hangzhou, China | 3rd | 1500 m | 4:25.36 |
| 2014 | Asian Indoor Championships | Hangzhou, China | 6th | 3000 m | 9:39.28 |
| 2014 | Asian Games | Incheon, South Korea | 11th | 1500 m | 4:32.07 |
| 2016 | Olympic Games | Rio de Janeiro, Brazil | 62nd | Marathon | 2:41:37 |
| 2017 | Islamic Solidarity Games | Baku, Azerbaijan | 6th | 10,000 m | 33:06.00 |
| 2018 | Asian Games | Jakarta, Indonesia | 12th | Marathon | 2:54:37 |

== Personal bests ==
Outdoor

- 1500 metres – 4:13.34 (Cheboksary 2012)
- 5000 metres – 15:29.28 (Guangzhou 2010) NR
- 10,000 metres – 32:16.34 (Guangzhou 2010) NR
- Marathon – 2:40:28 (London 2017)

Indoor

- 1500 metres – 4:25.36 (Hangzhou 2014) NR
- 3000 metres – 9:30.76 (Doha 2010) NR
