= 2007 Asian Athletics Championships – Women's 5000 metres =

The women's 5000 metres event at the 2007 Asian Athletics Championships was held in Amman, Jordan on July 28.

== Results ==
Rank	Name	Nationality	Time	Notes
1st place, gold medalist(s)	Kareema Saleh Jasim	Bahrain	16:40.87	
2nd place, silver medalist(s)	Preeja Sreedharan	India	16:56.16	
3rd place, bronze medalist(s)	Kim Mi-Gyong	North Korea	18:21.32	
4	Leila Ebrahimi	Iran	18:50.23	
