= Ayumi Hagiwara =

Japanese long-distance runner

Ayumi Hagiwara (萩原歩美, Hagiwara Ayumi; born 1 June 1992) is a Japanese athlete specialising in long-distance running events. She won the bronze medal in the 10,000 metres at the 2014 Asian Games.

== Competition record ==
Year	Competition	Venue	Position	Event	Notes
Representing Japan
2013	Asian Championships	Pune, India	3rd	10,000 m	32:47.44
2014	Asian Games	Incheon, South Korea	3rd	10,000 m	31:55.67

== Personal bests ==
Outdoor

- 5000 metres – 15:24.56 (Yamaguchi 2014)
- 10,000 metres – 31:41.80 (Yamaguchi 2014)
- 15 kilometres – 49:35 (Matsue 2014)
- 20 kilometres – 1:06:42 (Matsue 2014)
- Half marathon – 1:10:17 (Matsue 2014)
