= Yuka Hori =

Japanese long-distance runner

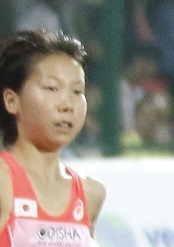
- Hori at the 2017 Asian Championships

Personal information
- Born: June 13, 1996 (age 30)
- Height: 155 cm (5 ft 1 in)
- Weight: 41 kg (90 lb)

Sport
- Sport: Athletics
- Event(s): 5000 m, 10000 m, half marathon
- Coached by: Toshitaka Anyoji (club)

Achievements and titles
- Personal best(s): 5000 m – 15:23.53 (2016); 10000 m – 31:59.80 (2017); HM – 1:11:05 (2018)
Medal record
Representing Japan
Asian Athletics Championships
Silver medal – second place	2017 Bhubaneswar	10,000 m

Yuka Hori (堀優花, Hori Yuka; born June 13, 1996) is a Japanese long-distance runner. She won a silver medal in the 10,000 m at the 2017 Asian Championships and placed seventh at the 2018 Asian Games.
