= Himalayan Adventure Challenge =

Annual adventure race held in India

Himalayan Adventure Challenge is an adventure race held every year in India. It is considered an extreme sport because it is held on the slopes of the Himalayas range. It's a triathlon race which includes rafting, hiking and mountain biking.

== History ==
The events held by Aqua Terra Trust. It was started in July 2013 after 2013 Uttarakhand floods and to promote tourism in flood affected areas. From then it was held every year at Atali Ganga Race track in Rishikesh, Uttarakhand.

== Events ==
The events varies by edition. The events can be for individuals or teams. The events are sponsored by various athletics organisation.

1. 10 kilometre (Intro.) - 5 km rafting + 5 km hiking
2. 30 kilometer ( Open) – 16 km hiking + 14 km rafting
3. 65 kilometre (Zealot) – 30 km mountain biking + 21 km hiking + 14 km rafting
4. 75 kilometre - hiking + cross country cycling + paddling
