= Carolyn Schuwalow =

Australian long-distance runner

Personal information
- Full name: Carolyn Jeni Schuwalow
- Nationality: Australian
- Born: 10 August 1965 (age 60)

Sport
- Sport: Long-distance running
- Event: 10,000 metres

Carolyn Jeni Schuwalow (born 10 August 1965) is an Australian long-distance runner. She competed in the women's 10,000 metres at the 1988 Summer Olympics.
