= Alia Saeed Mohammed =

Emirati long-distance runner

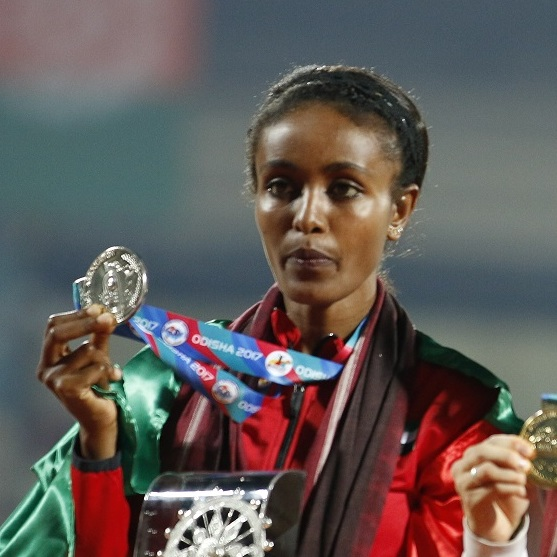
- Silver at the 2017 Asian Athletics Championships

Personal information
- Nationality: UAE
- Born: Medina Kadir; 18 May 1991 (age 35) Ethiopia
- Occupation: athlete
Medal record
Women's athletics
Representing United Arab Emirates
Asian Games
Gold medal – first place	2014 Incheon	10,000 m
Asian Indoor Championships
Bronze medal – third place	2014 Hangzhou	3000 m
Bronze medal – third place	2016 Doha	3000 m
Pan Arab Games
Gold medal – first place	2011 Doha	5000 m

Alia Saeed Mohammed (born Medina Kadir on 18 May 1991 in Ethiopia) is a long-distance runner who competes for the United Arab Emirates. She switched allegiance from her native Ethiopia in 2010. She was the 10,000 metres gold medallist at the 2014 Asian Games and the 2015 Asian Athletics Championships. She took the Silver at the 2017 Asian Athletics Championships

== Competition record ==
Year	Competition	Venue	Position	Event	Notes
Representing Ethiopia
2007	World Youth Championships	Ostrava, Czech Republic	32nd (h)	800 m	2:13.77
2008	World Junior Championships	Bydgoszcz, Poland	29th (h)	800 m	2:10.15
Representing the United Arab Emirates
2011	Asian Championships	Kobe, Japan	4th	5000 m	15:52.07
2011	World Championships	Daegu, South Korea	20th (h)	5000 m	16:10.37
2011	Arab Championships	Al Ain, United Arab Emirates	2nd	1500 m	4:22.48
2011	Arab Championships	Al Ain, United Arab Emirates	2nd	5000 m	16:10.67
2011	Pan Arab Games	Doha, Qatar	1st	5000 m	16:11.54
2012	Asian Indoor Championships	Hangzhou, China	8th	1500 m	4:28.32
2012	Asian Indoor Championships	Hangzhou, China	4th	3000 m	9:01.03
2012	World Indoor Championships	Istanbul, Turkey	12th	3000 m	9:15.74
2012	West Asian Championships	Dubai, United Arab Emirates	1st	5000 m	16:20.62
2012	West Asian Championships	Dubai, United Arab Emirates	1st	10,000 m	34:23.72
2013	Asian Championships	Pune, India	4th	5000 m	15:45.55
2013	Asian Championships	Pune, India	2nd	10,000 m	32:39.39
2013	Islamic Solidarity Games	Palembang, Indonesia	3rd	10,000 m	33:44.12
2014	Asian Indoor Championships	Hangzhou, China	3rd	3000 m	8:56.78
2014	World Indoor Championships	Sopot, Poland	12th	3000 m	9:21.23
2014	Asian Games	Incheon, South Korea	6th	5000 m	15:30.46
2014	Asian Games	Incheon, South Korea	1st	10,000 m	31:51.86
2015	Asian Championships	Wuhan, China	2nd	5000 m	15:28.74
2015	Asian Championships	Wuhan, China	1st	10,000 m	32:39.39 CR
2015	World Championships	Beijing, China	–	10,000 m	DNF
2015	Arab Championships	Isa Town, Bahrain	1st	10000 m	32:16.97
2016	Asian Indoor Championships	Doha, Qatar	3rd	3000 m	8:48.62
2016	Olympic Games	Rio de Janeiro, Brazil	23rd	10,000 m	31:56.74
2017	Islamic Solidarity Games	Baku, Azerbaijan	4th	5000 m	15:00.45
2017	Islamic Solidarity Games	Baku, Azerbaijan	3rd	10,000 m	31:49.01
2017	Asian Championships	Bhubaneswar, India	2nd	5000 m	15:59.95
2017	Asian Championships	Bhubaneswar, India	–	10,000 m	DNF
2017	Asian Indoor and Martial Arts Games	Ashgabat, Turkmenistan	1st	3000 m	9:25.03
2017	Arab Championships	Radès, Tunisia	1st	5000 m	16:39.41
2017	Arab Championships	Radès, Tunisia	1st	10,000 m	38:53.31
2018	West Asian Championships	Amman, Jordan	3rd	5000 m	16:43.31
2018	West Asian Championships	Amman, Jordan	2nd	10,000 m	33:54.95
2018	Asian Games	Jakarta, Indonesia	9th	5000 m	16:09.49
2018	Asian Games	Jakarta, Indonesia	4th	10,000 m	32:18.32

== Personal bests ==
Outdoor

- 800 metres – 2:06.0 (Addis Ababa 2008)
- 3000 metres – 8:55.40 (Sollentuna 2015)
- 5000 metres – 15:00.45 (Baku 2017)
- 10,000 metres – 31:10.25 (Dubai 2016)
- 10 kilometres – 32:20 (Dubai 2015)

Indoor

- 3000 metres – 8:48.27 (Stockholm 2014)
- 5000 metres – 15:34.70 (Stockholm 2017)
