= Cross country running =

Sport of racing on natural terrain

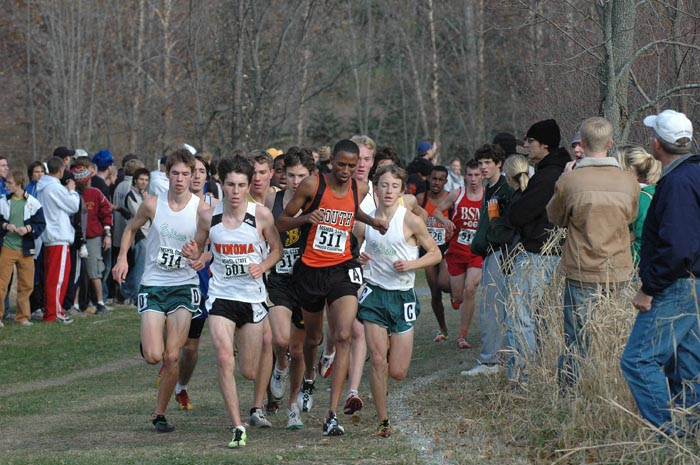
- A men's cross country competition in Northfield, Minnesota
- Highest governing body: World Athletics

Presence
- Olympic: 1912–1924
- World Championships: 1973–

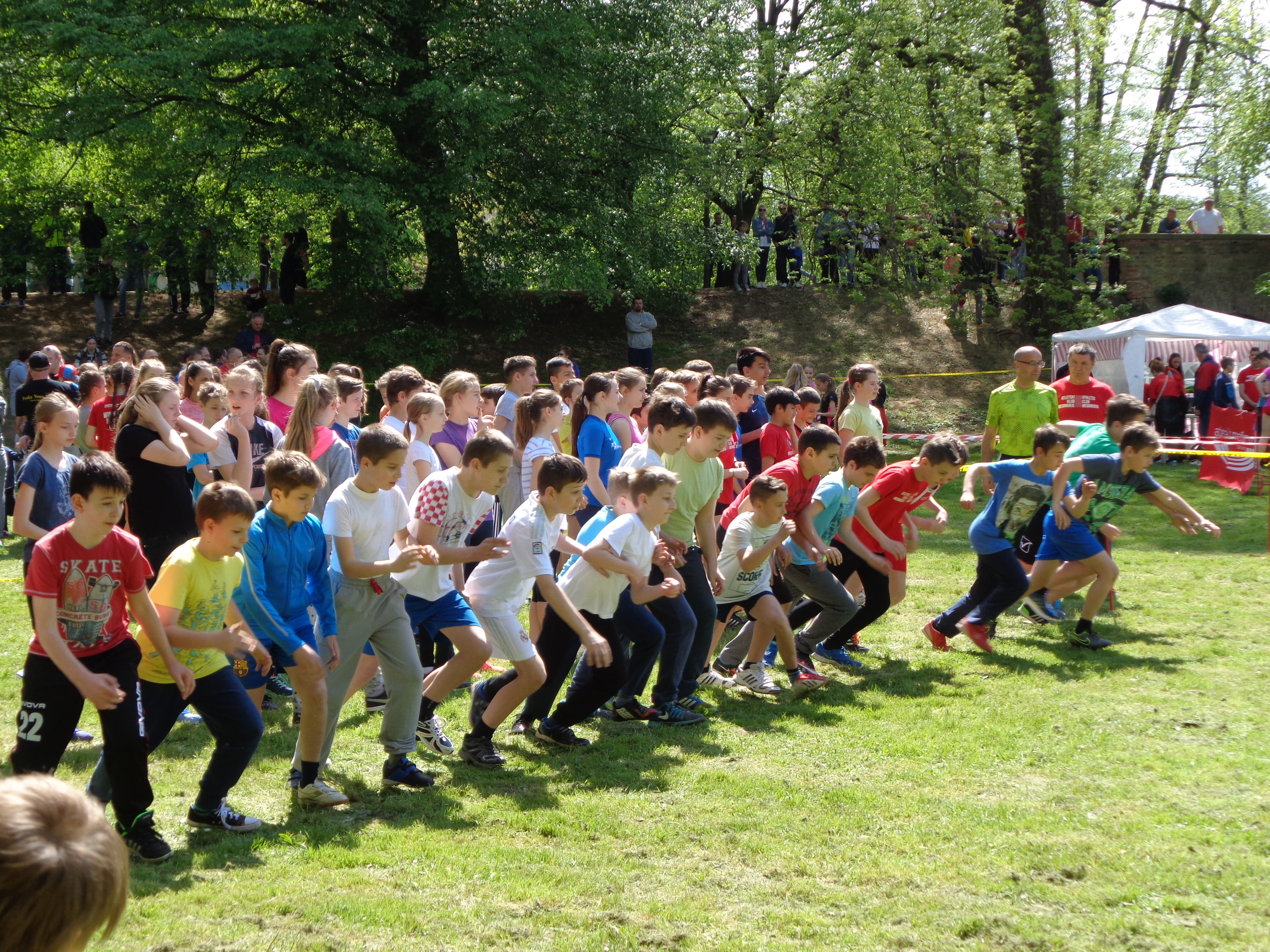
A children's cross country competition in Čakovec, Croatia

Cross country running is a sport in which teams and individuals run a race on open-air courses over natural terrain such as dirt or grass. The course, typically 3–12 kilometres (1.9–7.5 mi) long, may include surfaces of grass and earth, pass through woodlands and open country, and include hills, flat ground and sometimes gravel road and minor obstacles. It is both an individual and a team sport. Runners are judged on individual times and teams by a points-scoring method. Both men and women of all ages compete in cross country, which usually takes place during autumn and winter, and can include weather conditions of rain, sleet, snow or hail, and a wide range of temperatures. Cross country running teams often have the word Harriers in their names.

Cross country running is one of the disciplines under the umbrella sport of athletics and is a natural-terrain version of long-distance track and road running. Although open-air running competitions are prehistoric, the rules and traditions of cross country racing emerged in Britain. The English championship became the first national competition in 1876, and the International Cross Country Championships was held for the first time in 1903. Since 1973, the foremost elite competition has been the World Athletics Cross Country Championships.

The highest level circuit of professional cross country competition is the World Athletics Cross Country Tour Gold level, administered by World Athletics since 2021.

== Race course ==
=== Course design ===
While a course may include natural or artificial obstacles, cross country courses support continuous running, and do not require climbing over high barriers, through deep ditches, or fighting through the underbrush, as do military-style assault courses.

A course at least 5 metres (5.5 yd) full allows competitors to pass others during the race. Clear markings keep competitors from making wrong turns, and spectators from interfering with the competition. Markings may include tape or ribbon on both sides of the course, chalk or paint on the ground, or cones. Some classes use colored flags to indicate directions: red flags for left turns, yellow flags for right turns, and blue flags to continue straight or stay within ten feet of the flag. Courses also commonly include distance markings, usually at each kilometer or each mile.

The course should have 400 to 1,200 m (440 to 1,310 yd) of level terrain before the first turn, to reduce contact and congestion at the start. However, many courses at smaller competitions have their first turn after a much shorter distance. The course should also have a corral or chute after the finish line to facilitate the recording of finishing positions.

=== Distances ===
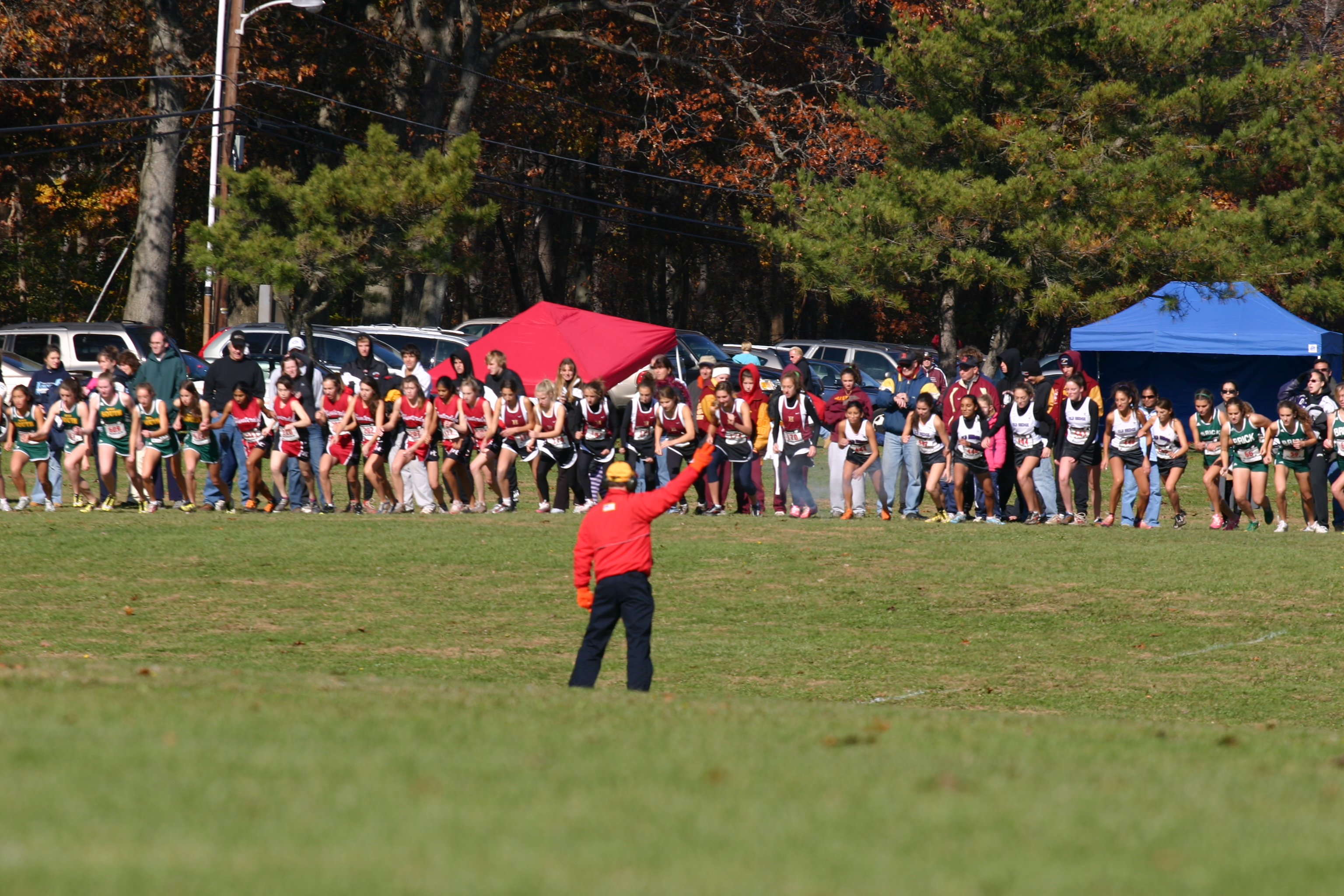
The start of a typical cross country race, as an official fires a gun to signal the start

Courses for international competitions consist of a loop between 1,750 and 2,000 meters. Athletes complete three to six loops, depending on the race. Senior men and women compete on a 10-kilometre course, junior men compete on an 8-kilometre course, and junior women compete on a 6-kilometre course.

In the United States, college men typically compete on 8 km (5.0 mi) or 10 km (6.2 mi) courses, while college women race for 5 km (3.1 mi) or 6 km (3.7 mi). High school students typically race on 3 mi (4.8 km) or 5 km (3.1 mi) courses.

== Strategy ==
Because of differences between courses in running surface, frequency and tightness of turns, and amount of up and downhill, cross country strategy does not necessarily simplify to running a steady pace from start to finish. Coaches and cross country runners debate the relative merits of fast starts to get clear of the field, versus steady pacing to maximize physiological efficiency. Some teams emphasize running in a group in order to provide encouragement to others on the team, while others hold that every individual should run their own race. In addition, whether one runs ahead of "the pack" or behind it and pull ahead in the end is important, but can vary according to the runner's individual skill, endurance, and the length of the race. Runners should also account for food intake prior to the race. Most important, however, is the training beforehand.

== Scoring (team) ==
While many cross country events are run for individual honors, team competition can require seven runners per side (with the exception that in some meets, you can enter at a minimum, 5 athletes.) The team score is the sum of the first five runners' combined finishes, where first place scores 1 point, second place scores 2 points, and so on. Thus, it's the lower team score that wins. (Example: Team 1 top five runners finish 2nd, 3rd, 6th, 7th and 8th for 26 points, while Team 2 runners finish 1st, 4th, 5th, 9th and 10th for 29 points, making Team 1 the winner.) While the sixth and seventh runners do not get a score, they can act as "displacers" by finishing ahead of one or more of the opposing team's top five runners, thus giving said runner(s) a higher score. In the rare case of a tie score, the team with the higher finishing sixth runner wins by tie-breaker.

== Equipment ==
Cross country running involves very little specialized equipment. Most races are run in shorts and vests or singlets, usually in club or school colours. In particularly cold conditions, long-sleeved shirts and tights can be worn to retain warmth without losing mobility. The most common footwear are cross country spikes, lightweight racing shoes with a rubber sole and five or more metal spikes screwed into the forefoot part of the sole. Spike length depends on race conditions, with a muddy course appropriate for spikes as long as 25 millimetres (0.98 in). If a course has a harder surface, spikes as short as 6 millimetres (0.24 in) may be most effective. While spikes are suitable for grassy, muddy, or other slippery conditions, runners may choose to wear racing flats, rubber-soled racing shoes without spikes, if the course includes significant portions of paved surfaces or dirt road.

== History ==
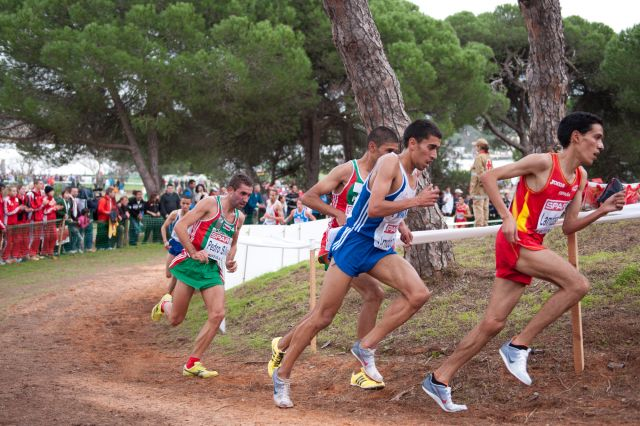
Runners at the 2010 European Cross Country Championships in Albufeira, Portugal

In 1819, boys at Shrewsbury School asked their headmaster, Dr Butler, if they could form a fox-hunting club, and he refused. The boys therefore formed an alternative club where instead of riding horses and chasing hounds they ran across country, with a small number of boys starting first to simulate the prey, and the rest following after an interval as though they were the chasing pack of dogs. Thus the terminology of hunting with dogs became associated with cross country running, with the leaders being called the hares, and the chasing pack the hounds. The hares carried a sack of paper scraps that they dropped to simulate their scent and provide a trail for the hounds to follow, and this sport was called paper chasing, or Hare and Hounds. Becoming popular at the school by 1831 it had become part of the curriculum, with several courses of different lengths. The original course of a little more than three miles was over some land owned by a farmer called Tuck, and is to this day known simply as Tucks.

These boys did not invent the idea of running across country, which had been known for centuries. Schools started the process of turning an adventurous and athletic pastime into an organised sport. The Scottish King Malcolm III is said to have summoned men to race up Craig Choinnich overlooking Braemar with the aim of finding the fastest runner in Scotland to be his royal messenger, and a 1540 manuscript in the British Museum describes a run across Roodee, also known as Chester Racecourse, for a prize of "six glayves of silver."

William Shakespeare, writing in the early 17th century, has Sir John Falstaff tell Prince Henry, "I would give a thousand pounds, I could run as fast as thou canst," and Samuel Pepys in his diary for 10 August 1660 describes going to Hyde Park to see, "a fine foot-race three times round the Park between an Irishman and Crow, that was once my Lord Claypoole's footman." In his diary for the year 1720, whilst he was an undergraduate at Oxford university, Sir Erasmus Phillips (1699–1743) later the MP for Haverfordwest, describes how he rode out to Woodstock Park one afternoon where he was one of, "a most prodigious concourse of people," who saw a four-mile foot race between the duke of Wharton's footman and Mr Diston's footman." In July 1826 Bell's Life reported that, "Yesterday se'nnight a match of running, between the gentlemen of Milton and the gentlemen of Chart, was won by the latter."

By 1834, Hare and Hounds was known at Rugby school, and their route, the "Barby Hill Run", was described in an 1857 novel, Tom Brown's School Days, by Thomas Hughes, who had gone to Rugby but was by then an influential politician. At Eton College, the chasing pack were known as Beagles, but in many other places they are called Harriers (a breed of dog used largely for hunting hares). At Harrow School they ran across farmland at Pinner, but Winchester school did not start cross country until sometime in the 1880s. In 1837, Rugby School started a longer run of approximately twelve miles known as the Crick Run because it goes out to the village of Crick and returns to the school. This has become an annual tradition and continues to this day.

By the early 1850s, athletic clubs had started holding their own paper chases as a form of training, the sport was seen at Oxford University by that time. A national championship was first held on 7 December 1867 on Wimbledon Common in south-west London. The course was about 3.5 miles, through a bog and over hills and started in the evening so runners had to navigate in the dark. Many runners went off course, and it was declared void and had to be rerun. The championship has been held over the distance of 10 miles (16,093 metres) since 1877.

In 1869, Thames Hare and Hounds, the world's first cross country running club, was formed in the same area of south west London, and the same year William C. Vosburgh of New York introduced the sport to the United States. The universities of Oxford and Cambridge held their first cross country contest at Oxford in December 1880, and Harvard University held races from the same year.

Three area associations were formed to administer the sport in their region of England. The Midland Counties Amateur Cross-Country Association was formed in 1879, the Northern Cross-Country Association in 1882, and the Southern Counties Cross-Country Association was established in 1883. Then also in 1883 the National Cross-Country Union was formed, with Walter Rye, the founder of Thames Hare and Hounds, as first President. In 1933 this was changed to the English Cross-Country Union because by then the other constituent countries of the United Kingdom had their own cross country associations. The Scottish Cross Country Union was formed in 1886 and held its first national championship at Lanark in March of that year, and the United States followed suit in 1887.

Over time the sacks of paper scraps gradually got discarded and courses came to be marked with flags, lines on the grass, bunting, and marshalls, with races held on farm land, through forests, and over various forms of mixed terrain with championships frequently being held on golf courses and horse racing courses.

In 1898, Harold Hardwick of Salford Harriers took a team across to France for a cross country match and in the process invented international cross country running as a sport. The International Cross Country Union was formed in 1903, and the four home nations of England, Ireland, Scotland and Wales started a match in that year which became a true international event in 1907 when France sent a team to compete. Other European countries sent teams during the 1920s and Tunisia sent a team in 1958.

The idea for a cross country relay originated in Paris in 1903, when the members of Stadte Francaise invited South London Harriers to Paris for a relay race of approximately fourteen miles to be held on Boxing Day, 26 December 1903. It is not known whether South London Harriers took up the invitation or whether the race actually took place. The first cross country relay for which there is definite evidence was organised by Hampstead Harriers at their club headquarters, the Green Man pub in East Finchley, also on Boxing Day, Wednesday 26 December 1906. The race had five teams of three men who each ran around two miles over a snow-covered out and back course. The first man to finish was G. Banbrook of team three in a time of 41:42 1/5.

Women were largely excluded from the sport for many years due to a widespread but false perception that it was injurious to their health and reproductive ability. Women were also excluded because they did not receive formal education, and the sport started largely at schools, from which women were excluded—women first went to university in England in 1868. There were races for women, but they were few and far between. At the Longtown Sports in Cumbria in June 1851 the prize for the women's race was three times that for the men's, and the first three women all got the same prize, whereas the second-placed man only got half the winner's prize. Women's sports clubs and formal competitions for women's teams did not arrive until the 1920s. France was the first country to hold national championships for women, in 1918, the first English championships for women were held at Hoo Park, Luton, in February 1927, and women were allowed to participate informally in international cross country only from 1931. There were not even officially any rules for women's cross country until 1962 and their races were not considered championships until 1967.

=== Olympic Games ===
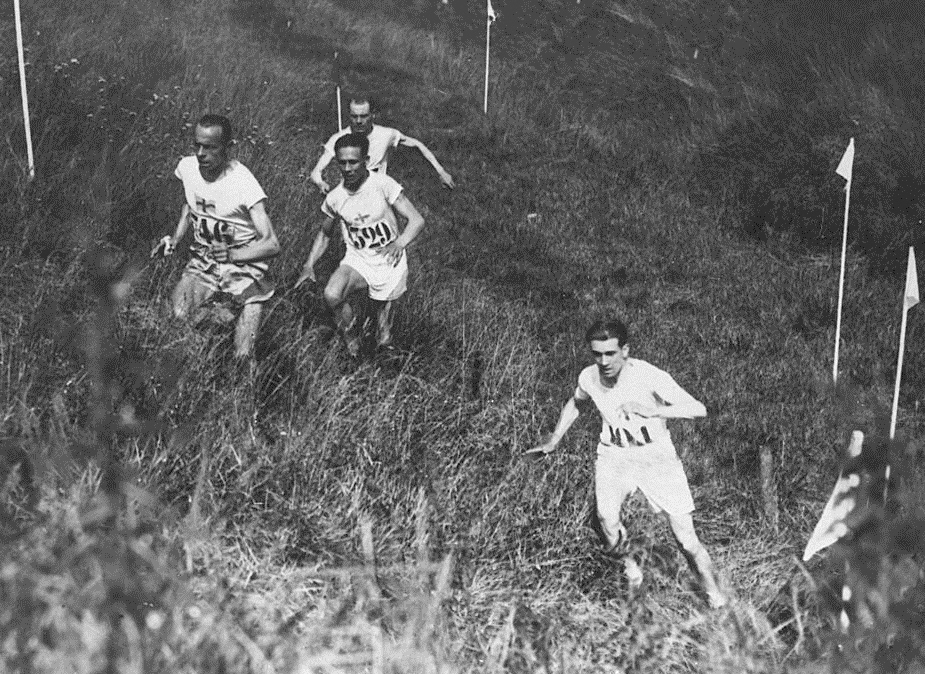
Edvin Wide, Ville Ritola, and Paavo Nurmi (on left) competing in the individual cross country race at the 1924 Summer Olympics in Paris; due to the hot weather, which exceeded 40 °C (104 °F), only 15 out of 38 competitors finished the race.

Cross country was contested as a team and individual event at the 1912, 1920 and 1924 Summer Olympics. Sweden took gold in 1912, and Finland, led by Paavo Nurmi, captured the gold in 1920 and 1924. During the 1924 race in the Paris heat wave, only 15 of the 38 competitors reached the finish. Eight of those were taken away on stretchers. One athlete began to run in tight circles after reaching the stadium and later knocked himself unconscious, while another fainted 50 meters from the finish. José Andía and Edvin Wide were reported dead, and medics spent hours trying to find all the competitors who had blacked out along the course.

Although the reports of deaths were unfounded, spectators were shocked by the attrition rate and Olympic officials decided to ban cross country running from future games. Since 1928, cross country has been contested only as the fifth discipline of the modern pentathlon, and until 2016 it was the only discipline where the Olympic competition was only part of the modern pentathlon.

There have been recent efforts to bring cross country running back to the Olympic Games. In 2020, World Athletics President Sebastian Coe pushed to bring the sport to the 2024 Summer Olympics in Paris, but the IOC rejected this proposal. Once the 2024 Summer Olympics arrived, Coe pushed for the sport to instead be included in the Winter Olympics, with efforts to make the sport appear in the 2030 and 2034 Winter Olympics in the French Alps and Salt Lake City respectively. Coe later stated he thought there was a "good chance" his proposals for cross country running would be approved by the IOC, and that "it would give Africa a proper presence at the Winter Games".

=== World championships ===
Beginning in 1973, the IAAF began hosting the renamed World Cross Country Championships each year.

In 1975, the New Zealand men and United States women won, marking the first championships by non-European countries. In 1981 an African nation (Ethiopia) won the men's race for the first time, and a decade later an African nation (Kenya) won the women's race for the first time. Ethiopia or Kenya has captured every men's title since 1981 and every women's title since 2001. Through 2010, Kenya has won 40 World Cross Country Championships and Ethiopia has won 23.

=== Notable athletes ===
- Kenenisa Bekele won both short and long World Cross Country course titles in the same year five times (2002–2006), after a junior men victory and senior long course silver in 2001. The IAAF calls him the "greatest ever male cross country runner to have graced the sport."
- Edward Cheserek is the three-time individual winner of the NCAA Division I championship in 2013, 2014, and 2015. Cheserek is the only athlete to win three straight individual NCAA championships.

== Regional organizations ==
Beyond championships, IAAF world cross country meetings include the Great Edinburgh International Cross Country, Cross Internacional de Itálica, Antrim International Cross Country, Cinque Mulini, Nairobi Cross, Chiba International Cross Country, Fukuoka International Cross Country meet, Eurocross and Almond Blossom Cross Country.

=== Australia ===
Cross country running is organized at the state level by the athletics association for each state. In Queensland, it is organized by Queensland Athletics. In the Masters category, which includes runners over 30, this is organized by Australian Masters Athletics. There is also the Australian Masters Nationals Championships.

The cross country season in Brisbane is usually March–September. During the season, there is usually one race each week in a different park, generally organized and hosted by one of the participating clubs.

=== Canada ===
Cross country running is a far-reaching sport in Canada. In middle school, races are more serious and are divided by grade and gender. In high school, the races are far-reaching and tend to be the main talent pool, especially at the senior level, for university or national-level runners. At the university level, the sport is administered by Canadian Interuniversity Sport.

=== India ===
National Championship is held every year by Athletics Federation of India. Nagaland hosted 56th National cross country Championship. It was held along with South Asian Cross country championship which was held by South Asian Athletics Federation. The last edition was held in Indira Gandhi Stadium, Kohima. Himalayan Adventure Challenge is another extreme cross country race held in Himalayan mountain slopes.

=== United Kingdom ===
Primary schools, although more often the juniors, also participate in cross country events and some areas of England have done so since the late 1960s. An example would be schools near Ouston, County Durham which compete as part of Chester-le-Street & District Primary Cross Country Association.

=== United States ===
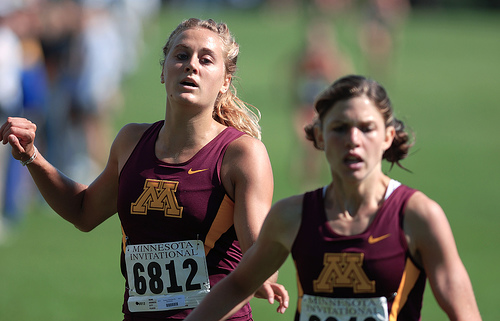
The Roy Griak Invitational cross country meet at the University of Minnesota in September 2007

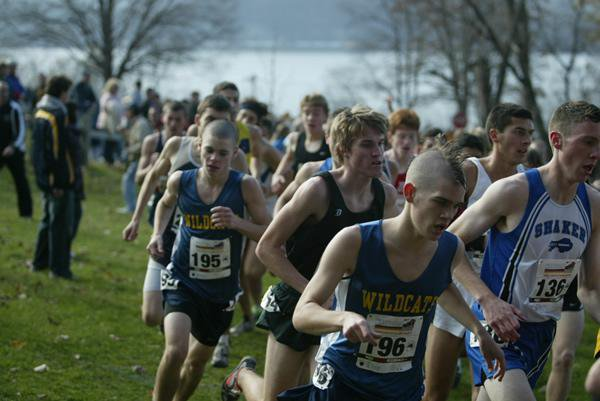
The New York State Federation Championship cross country meet in November 2010

USA Track & Field (USATF) hosts four annual national cross country championships. The USA Cross Country Championships, first held in 1890, include six races: masters women (8 km), masters men (8 km), junior women (6 km), junior men (8 km), open women (8 km) and open men (12 km). In addition to crowning national champions, the championships serve as the trials race to select the Team USA squad for the IAAF World Cross Country Championships. The USATF Masters 5 km Cross Country Championships, first held in 2002, incl men's race and a women's race. The USATF National Club Cross Country Championships, first held in 1998, feature the top clubs from across the United States, who vie for honors and bragging rights as the nation's top cross country team. The USATF National Junior Olympic Cross Country Championships, first held in 2001, has raced for boys and girls in five two-year age divisions.

Most American universities and colleges field men's and women's cross country teams as part of their athletic program. Over 900 men's cross country teams and over 1000 women's cross country teams compete in the three divisions of the National Collegiate Athletic Association. Men usually race 10 km (6.2 mi) or 8 km (5.0 mi), and women usually race 6 km (3.7 mi) or 5 km (3.1 mi).

==== High School ====
Above the youth or middle school level, every state offers cross country as a high school sport for boys and girls. Over 440,000 high school students compete in cross country each year, making it the sixth-most popular sport for girls, and seventh most popular for boys. High school students typically race on 3 mi (4.8 km) or 5 km (3.1 mi) courses.

The Mt. San Antonio College in Walnut, California hosts the largest cross country invitational in the United States, with over 22,000 runners from community colleges, high schools and elementary schools competing. The meet started in 1948 and continues today.

There are two major national championships on the high school level; the Nike Cross Nationals, and the Foot Locker Cross Country Championships.

Beginning with Nike Cross Nationals, this competition splits the United States into eight qualifying regions with their own respective regional events, listed below.

Competition	2025 Venue and Location	2025 Date	State(s) Included (Note: In 2024, California does not have a regional, with their state championship instead serving this purpose. https://www.hows.tech/2024/04/what-nxr-region-is-california-in.html#)
NXR Heartland Regional	Yankton Trail Park, Sioux Falls, SD	November 9, 2025	Iowa, Kansas, Minnesota, Nebraska, North Dakota, South Dakota, Wisconsin
NXR Northwest Regional	Spokane Polo Fields, Spokane, WA	November 14-15, 2025	Alaska, Hawaii, Idaho, Montana, Oregon, (Washington (state)) Washington, Wyoming
NXR Midwest Regional	LaVern Gibson Championship Cross Country Course, Terre Haute, IN	November 16, 2025	Indiana, Illinois, Ohio, Michigan, Missouri
NXR Southwest Regional	Toka Sticks Golf Club, Mesa, AZ	November 22, 2025	Arizona, Colorado, New Mexico, Nevada, Utah
NXR South Regional	Watts Cross Country Course, College Station, TX	November 24, 2025	Arkansas, Louisiana, Oklahoma, Texas, Mississippi
NXR Southeast Regional	WakeMed Soccer Park, Cary, NC	November 22, 2025	Delaware, Maryland, Virginia, North Carolina, South Carolina, (Georgia (U.S. state)) Georgia, Florida, Alabama, Tennessee, Kentucky, West Virginia, (Washington, D.C.) District of Columbia
NXR Northeast Regional	Bowdoin Park, Wappingers Falls, NY	November 22, 2025	Connecticut, Massachusetts, Maine, New Hampshire, New Jersey, Pennsylvania, Rhode Island, Vermont
NXR New York Regional (Has since been merged with Northeast Regional)	Bowdoin Park, Wappingers Falls, NY	November 22, 2025	(New York (state)) New York

After these eight regionals, the Nike Cross Nationals itself will take place on December 7, 2024 at the Glendoveer Golf Course in Portland, Oregon.

The Foot Locker Cross Country Championships, sponsored by HOKA, are managed similarly, with four regionals instead of eight, detailed in the chart below. The 2023 Foot Locker Championships took place on December 9 at Balboa Park in San Diego, CA.

Competition	2023 Venue or Location	2023 Date	State(s) Included (Note: All include U.S. citizens in overseas military instillations)
Foot Locker West Regional	Mt. Sac Walnut, CA	December 2, 2023	Alaska, Arizona, California, Hawaii, Idaho, Montana, Nevada, New Mexico, Oregon, Utah, (Washington (state)) Washington, Wyoming
Foot Locker Mid West Regional	UW-Parkside Kenosha, WI	November 25, 2023	Colorado, Illinois, Indiana, Iowa, Kansas, Michigan, Minnesota, Missouri,Nebraska, North Dakota, Ohio, South Dakota, Wisconsin
Foot Locker South Regional	McAlpine Park Charlotte, NC	November 25, 2023	Alabama, Arkansas, Florida, (Georgia (U.S. state)) Georgia, Kentucky, Louisiana, Mississippi, North Carolina, Oklahoma, Puerto Rico, South Carolina, Tennessee,Texas, Virginia, West Virginia, (United States Virgin Islands) U.S. Virgin Islands
Foot Locker North East Regional	Franklin Park Boston, MA	November 25, 2023	Connecticut, Delaware, Maine, Maryland, Massachusetts, New Hampshire, New Jersey, (New York (state)) New York, Pennsylvania, Rhode Island, Vermont, (Washington, D.C.) District of Columbia

=== Notable races ===
- World Cross Country Championships is an international cross country championship race hosted by World Athletics (formerly the IAAF) in which athletes represent their home countries. Since 2011, the race has been held every two years. World Athletics describes the race as "the most grueling, 'back to basics' event of the World Athletics Series."
- NCAA Division I Cross Country Championships are races held for men and women by the NCAA every fall as the culminating events of the inter-collegiate cross country season. Runners represent their schools and can qualify either as a team or as an individual. The NCAA describes the Division I races as "one of the most intriguing of all DI championships."
- USATF National Club Cross Country Championships is an annual cross country competition hosted by USA Track and Field usually held in mid-February. There are five races within this championship: a masters women 6 km, masters men 60+ 8 km, masters men (40–59) 10 km, open women 6 km, and open men 10 km. The open races also serve as selection races for the World Athletics Cross Country Championships.
- Great Edinburgh International Cross Country is a cross country competition held annually in Edinburgh, Scotland. The competition consists of four races: the junior men's 6 km, the junior women's 4 km, senior men's 8 km and senior women's 6 km. While the event frequently attracts world-class competition, it has not been held since 2019.

=== Notable courses ===
- Franklin Park is a park in Boston, described as a "famed cross country course," hosted the IAAF World Cross Country Championships in 1992. The course hosts high school races, college, and professional races, including the New England Cross Country Championships. It is also home the annual Battle in Beantown collegiate invitational.
- Van Cortlandt Park is located in The Bronx, New York City, and has been described as "the most storied cross country course in the United States." The park has hosted NCAA cross championships, world cross country championships, and is used for training by many elite runners in the area. It is also home to the annual Manhattan College Cross Country Invitational.
- LaVern Gibson Championship Cross Country Course, dubbed "Cross Country Town USA," is located in Terre Haute, Indiana, and is the home course of Indiana State University. It has hosted the NCAA Division I Cross Country championships 12 times. The course is notable because it was designed specifically for cross country races.
- Thomas Zimmer Championship Course is located on the campus of the University of Wisconsin Madison. The course opened in the fall of 2009, and was host to the 2018 NCAA Cross Country Championship. The course is also home to the annual Nuttycomb Wisconsin Invitational, one of the largest collegiate cross country competitions.

=== Eating disorders ===
Physical leanness is desirable to achieve competitive success in cross country running. This emphasis on body weight has led to a culture of eating disorders within the sport. Scholars have cited a high incidence of eating disorders among cross country (long-distance) runners. They have noted that while eating disorders can occur in all runners, they are far more prevalent among female athletes. Other factors, such as social pressures and the overall stress of the college environment also contribute to the prevalence of eating disorders among female college cross country runners. Following professional runner Mary Cain's 2019 account of how the competitive pressures of long distance running contributed to her eating disorder, many other prominent female cross country athletes have tried to bring attention to the issue of eating disorders in the sport.

=== Injuries in cross country running ===
- Many cross-country runners suffer from running-related injuries, momentarily restricting their movements and pursuit in racing. Around 53% of collegiate runners suffer from either a second RRI or their first RRI. This is largely due to various reasons, but the common one is because running involves repetitive, high-impact movements of the legs, which affects the bone mineral density. As such, when bone density is at risk, this leads to a greater chance of developing a BSI (bone stress injury).
- Bone stress injuries is one of the most common RRI injuries young runners face. Bone stress injuries are often caused by the bone's sudden inability to endure repetitive movements. Bone stress injuries can take a while to heal, averaging around 27 weeks to fully heal. While healed runners can safely start running again, precautionary measures and physical therapy are recommended as bone stress injuries can occur again.

== See also ==
- Orienteering
