= Preeja Sreedharan =

Indian long-distance runner

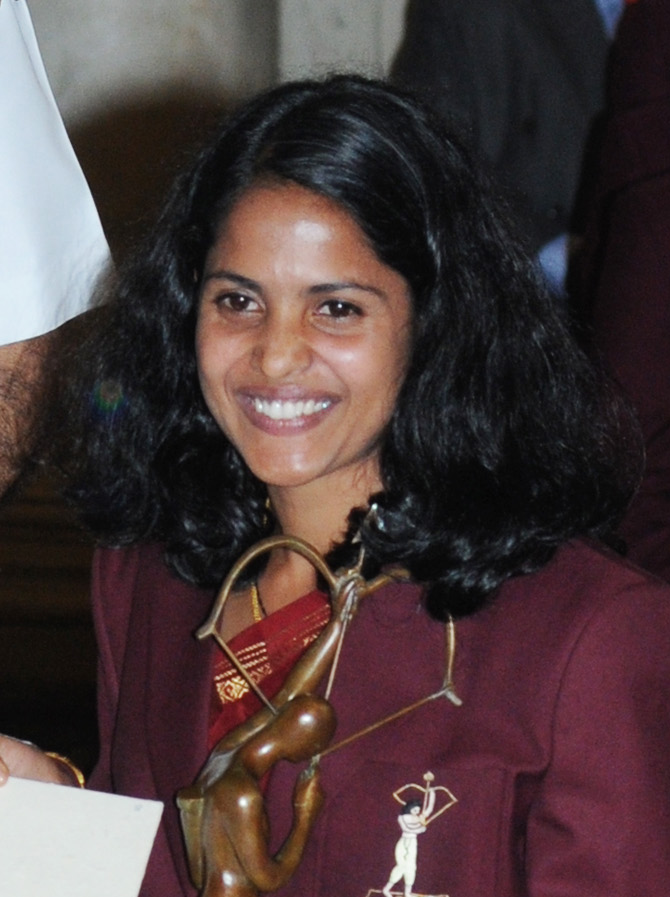
- Sreedharan in 2011

Personal information
- Nationality: Indian
- Born: 13 March 1982 (age 44) Idukki, Kerala, India
- Spouse: Deepak Gopinath (m. 2012)

Sport
- Sport: Running
- Events: 10,000 metres, 5000 metres
Medal record
Women's athletics
Representing India
Asian Games
Gold medal – first place	2010 Guangzhou	10,000m
Silver medal – second place	2010 Guangzhou	5000m
Asian Championships
Silver medal – second place	2007 Amman	5000 m
Silver medal – second place	2007 Amman	10,000 m
Asian Indoor Championships
Gold medal – first place	2008 Doha	3000 m

Preeja Sreedharan (born 13 March 1982 at Mullakkanam, Idukki, Kerala) is an Indian long-distance runner. She holds the national records in both the 10,000 metres and 5000 metres disciplines, which she set en route to the gold and silver medals at 2010 Guangzhou Asian Games. Sreedharan was conferred with the Arjuna Award, India's second highest sporting honour by the central government in 2011.

Sreedharan's breakthrough came in 2007, when she won the silver medal in both the disciplines at the Asian Athletics Championships. She bettered her personal bests and the Indian national records in both the 10000 and 5000 meters at 2010 Asian Games; she won the gold in the 10000 meters and the silver in 5000 meters. She announced her retirement from international circuit in February 2015.

== Personal life ==
Preeja was born to Sreedharan and Remani in Idukki, Kerala.She belonged to a middle-class family. Her father was a manual labourer and died when she was 8 years old. She has an elder brother Pradeep and an elder sister Preethy. After her father's demise her brother had to leave school at 6th standard and take up job in order to meet household expenses. She graduated from Alphonsa College, Pala. She married Dr.Deepak Gopinath on 11 November 2012 at Palakkad, Kerala. Preeja Sreedharan has been employed as a Superintendent by the Southern Railway. The couple have two children, Darshan (born on 2016) and Dhyan (born on 2018).

== Career ==
At the 2006 Asian Games, Sreedharan finished fifth in both the 5000 and the 10,000 metres. At the 2007 Asian Championships at Amman she won the silver medals in the two events. She qualified for the Beijing Olympics in June 2008 after achieving a B qualifying mark for the Games and then finished twenty-fifth in the Olympic 10,000 metres.

Sreedharan achieved her personal best of 31:50:28 minutes in the 10,000 metres en route to the gold medal at the 2010 Guangzhou Asian Games; she also broke the Indian national record with the performance. Sreedharan also won the silver medal in 5000 metres at the event. With the time of 15:15.89 minutes, she also bettered the national record in 5000 meters.

Sreedharan was selected as Manorama Newsmaker of the year 2010. The selection was done through an online SMS voting from public. The finalists with Preeja were, Booker Prize winner Arundhati Roy, Njhanpeedam winner and famous Malayalam poet ONV Kurup and famous politician, and financial minister K. M. Mani.

Sreedharan was the fastest Indian woman at the 2014 Delhi Half Marathon. She also participated at the 2014 Asian Games, but was unable to win any medal. Sreedharan announced her retirement from international competitions in February 2015. She said that she would participate in her last competition at the 2015 National Athletics Championships: "With the next national games, I would leave the track for ever. The decision was taken to focus on family life, I would continue to strive for promoting athletics."

Most Important landmarks in career

• She is the Indian athlete to represent India in 10000m in Olympics. She qualified for the Beijing Olympics in June 2008 after achieving a B qualifying mark for the Games and then finished twenty-fifth in the Olympic 10,000 metres.

• She won gold medal in the 10,000 metres event and silver medal in 5000 metres at the Guangzhou Asian Games 2010.

• She holds Indian national record for both 5000 and 10,000 metres as on 18.10.2020.

• At the 2007 Asian Championships at Amman, she won the silver medal in the 10,000 metres and 5000 Meters.

• Her personal best for the 10,000 metres is 31:50:28 minutes in Guangzhou Asian Games. This is the current Indian national record .

• Her personal best for the 5000 metres is 15:15 minutes in Guangzhou Asian Games. This is the current Indian national record.

• She was selected as Manorama Newsmaker of the year 2010( Kerala State ).

International Achievements

Beijing Olympics 2008 10000m Participation

Asian Games – Guangzhau 2010 10000m Gold Medal (Current National Record )

Asian Games – Guangzhau 2010 5000m Silver Medal (current National record )

Asian Athletics Championship 2007 10000m Silver Medal

Asian Athletic Championship 2007 5000m Silver Medal

2nd Asian Indoor Games Macao – 2007 3000m Silver Medal

3rd Asian Indoor Championship – Doha 2008 3000m Gold Medal

10th South Asian Games Columbo 2006 10000m Gold medal

19th Asian Athletic Championship Kobai 2011 10000m Bronze Medal

6th Asian Cross Country Kadmandu 2001 4 km Silver Medal

NATIONAL LEVEL

9th National Athletic Championship Thrissur-2001 10000m Gold Medal

9th National Athletic Championship Thrissur 2001 5000m Gold Medal

10th National athletic championship – Chandigarh 2002 1500m Gold Medal

10th National athletic championship – Chandigarh 2002 5000m Silver Medal

37th National Cross Country Championship Goa 4 km Gold Medal

7th Federation Cup Cross country 2002 8 km Bronze Medal

44th National Open Athletics Championship – Mumbai 2004 5000m Gold Medal

44th National Interstate Senior Athletic Championship 2004 5000m Silver Medal

44th National Interstate Senior Athletic Championship 2004 1500m Bronze Medal

38th National Cross country Championship Shimla 2004 4 km race Gold Medal

45th National Interstate Senior athletics championship – Bangalore 2005 5000m Bronze Medal

11th Federation cup National Senior Athletics championship Delhi 5000m Silver Medal

45th National Open Athletic Championship Hyderabad 2005 5000m Silver Medal

45th National Open Athletic Championship Hyderabad 2005 1500m Bronze Medal

46th National Open Athletic Championship Delhi 2006 10000m Gold Medal

46th National Interstate Senior Athletic Championship Chennai 2006 10000m Gold Medal

46th National Interstate Senior Athletic Championship Chennai 2006 5000m Gold Medal

1st National Endurance Athletic Competition Delhi 2006 1500m Silver Medal

33rd National Games Guwahati 2007 10000 Gold Medal

33rd National Games Guwahati 2007 5000m Gold Medal

33rd National Games Guwahati 2007 1500 m Gold Medal

47th National Open Athletic Championship Jamshedpur 2007 10000m Gold Medal

47th National Open Athletic Championship Jamshedpur 2007 5000m Gold Medal

47th National Interstate Senior Athletic Championship Bhopal 2007 10000m Silver Medal

47th National Interstate Senior Athletic Championship Bhopal 5000m Silver Medal

48th National Open Athletic Championship Kochi 2008 10000m Gold Medal

48th National Open Athletic Championship Kochi 2008 5000m Gold Medal

14th Federation Cup National Senior Athletic Championship 2008 Bhopal 5000m Silver Medal

50th National Interstate Senior Athletic Championship Patiala 2010 10000m Gold Medal

15th Federation Cup National Senior Athletic Championship Ranchi 2010 10000m Gold Medal

50th National Open Athletic Championship – Kochi 2010 10000m Silver Medal

15th Federation Cup National Senior Athletic Championship Ranchi 2010 5000m Silver Medal

51st National Open Athletic Championship – Kolkata 2011 10000m Gold Medal

34th National Games, Jharkhand 2011 10000m Silver Medal

34th National Games, Jharkhand 2011 5000m Silver Medal

53rd National Open Athletic Championship – Ranchi 2013 10000m Bronze medal

53rd National Open Athletic Championship – Ranchi 2013 5000m Silver Medal

53rd National Interstate Senior Athletic Championship Chennai 2013 10000m Gold Medal

53rd National Interstate Senior Athletic Championship Chennai 2013 5000m Silver Medal

48th National Cross country championships Jalpaiguri 2013 8 km Gold Medal

54th National Open Athletic Championship – Delhi 2014 10000m Silver Medal

35th National games Kerala 2015 10000m Silver Medal

== Awards ==
Following her performance at the 2010 Asian Games, Sreedharan was conferred with the Arjuna Award in 2011 by the Government of India.

G V Raja Award ( Kerala State ) – 2001

Manorama Newsmaker of the Year ( Kerala State ) – 2011

Jimmy Gorge Award- 2012
