= Tejitu Daba =

Ethiopian-Bahraini long-distance runner (born 1991)

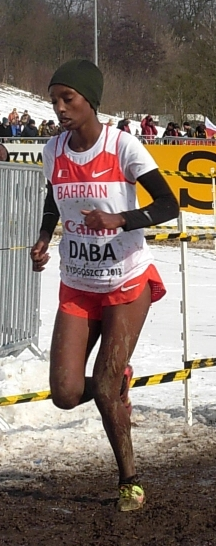
- Tejitu Daba during the 2013 World Cross Country Championships

Medal record

Women's athletics

Representing Bahrain

Asian Championships
Gold medal – first place	2011 Kobe	5000 m

Asian Indoor Championships
Bronze medal – third place	2012 Hangzhou	3000 m

Pan Arab Games
Gold medal – first place	2011 Doha	10,000 m

Tejitu Daba Chalchissa (born 20 August 1991) is an Ethiopian-born long-distance runner who competes internationally for Bahrain. She competes mainly in cross country and track running events. She won the gold medal over 5000 metres at the 2011 Asian Athletics Championships.

Tejitu began running for Bahrain in 2009 and her first outing for her adopted country came at the Asian Cross Country Championships, where she was second in the junior ranks behind Shitaye Eshete (another Ethiopian-turned-Bahraini). She then ran in the junior race of the 2009 IAAF World Cross Country Championships, placing 23rd overall. Turning to track events, she completed a 5000 metres/10,000 metres double at the Arab Athletics Championships. In October she won the 3000 metres gold medal at the 2009 Asian Indoor Games She looked set to top the podium again at the 2009 Asian Athletics Championships, but she slowed too early at the line and allowed Xue Fei to pip her at the line. Tejitu also represented Bahrain in the 10,000 metres at the competition and was fourth overall.

At the 2010 IAAF World Cross Country Championships, she reached the top ten in the junior race and was the only runner in the top twelve who did not compete for Kenya or Ethiopia. She ran a national junior record for 3000 metres at the Arab Junior Championships, while running a 3000/5000 metres double. She went on to take the 5000 metres gold at the 2010 Asian Junior Athletics Championships, although she managed only fourth in the 3000 metres race. Later that month she attended the 2010 World Junior Championships in Athletics and delivered a 3000 m best of 9:01.22 minutes and 5000 m best of 15:29.78 minutes, reaching the top five in both disciplines. She represented Asia/Pacific at the 2010 IAAF Continental Cup and came sixth in the 3000 metres. She was chosen to compete for Bahrain at the 2010 Asian Games and gave her third personal best performance of the year in the 10,000 metres, where her time of 32:21.29 minutes brought her seventh place.

She moved up to the senior level in 2011 and helped the Bahraini women to fourth in the team rankings at the 2011 IAAF World Cross Country Championships. Tejitu won her first major senior title later that year, winning the 5000 metres at the 2011 Asian Athletics Championships while two other former Ethiopians (Genzebe Shami and Shitaye Eshete) made it a distance running sweep for Bahrain from 1500 metres to 10,000 m. She placed second behind Shitaye Eshete in the 5000 metres at the 2011 Military World Games, and went on to set a personal best of 15:14.62 minutes to finish ninth at the 2011 World Championships in Athletics. She ended the year with a 10,000 m win at the 2011 Pan Arab Games.

She won the bronze over 3000 metres at the 2012 Asian Indoor Athletics Championships, but failed to make it past the heats at the 2012 IAAF World Indoor Championships. She was runner-up in a Bahraini podium sweep at the 2012 Asian Cross Country Championships alongside Shitaye Eshete and Genzebe Shami.

== See also ==
- List of eligibility transfers in athletics
