= Kavita Tungar =

Indian Olympic athlete

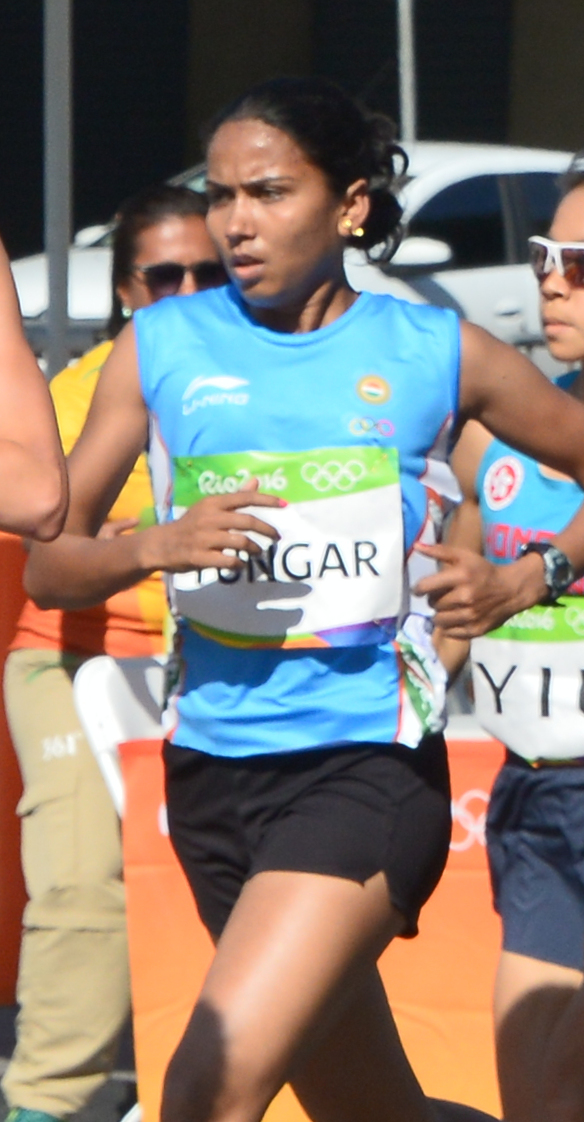
- Tungar at the 2016 Olympics

Personal information
- Born: 9 December 1985 (age 40) Nashik, Maharashtra, India
- Height: 157 cm (5 ft 2 in)
- Weight: 45 kg (99 lb)

Sport
- Sport: Track and field athletics
- Event: Long-distance running
- Coached by: Vijender Singh

Achievements and titles
- Personal bests: 5000 m – 15:16.54 (2010); 10,000 m – 31:51.44 (2010); HM – 1:12:50 (2009); Mar – 2:38:38 (2016)
Medal record
Representing India
Women's athletics
Asian Games
Silver medal – second place	2010 Guangzhou	10,000 m
Bronze medal – third place	2010 Guangzhou	5000 m
Asian Indoor Championships
Silver medal – second place	2008 Doha	3000 m
South Asian Games
Gold medal – first place	2016 Guwahati	Marathon
Commonwealth Games
Bronze medal – third place	2010 Delhi	10,000 m
- Updated on 9 October 2010

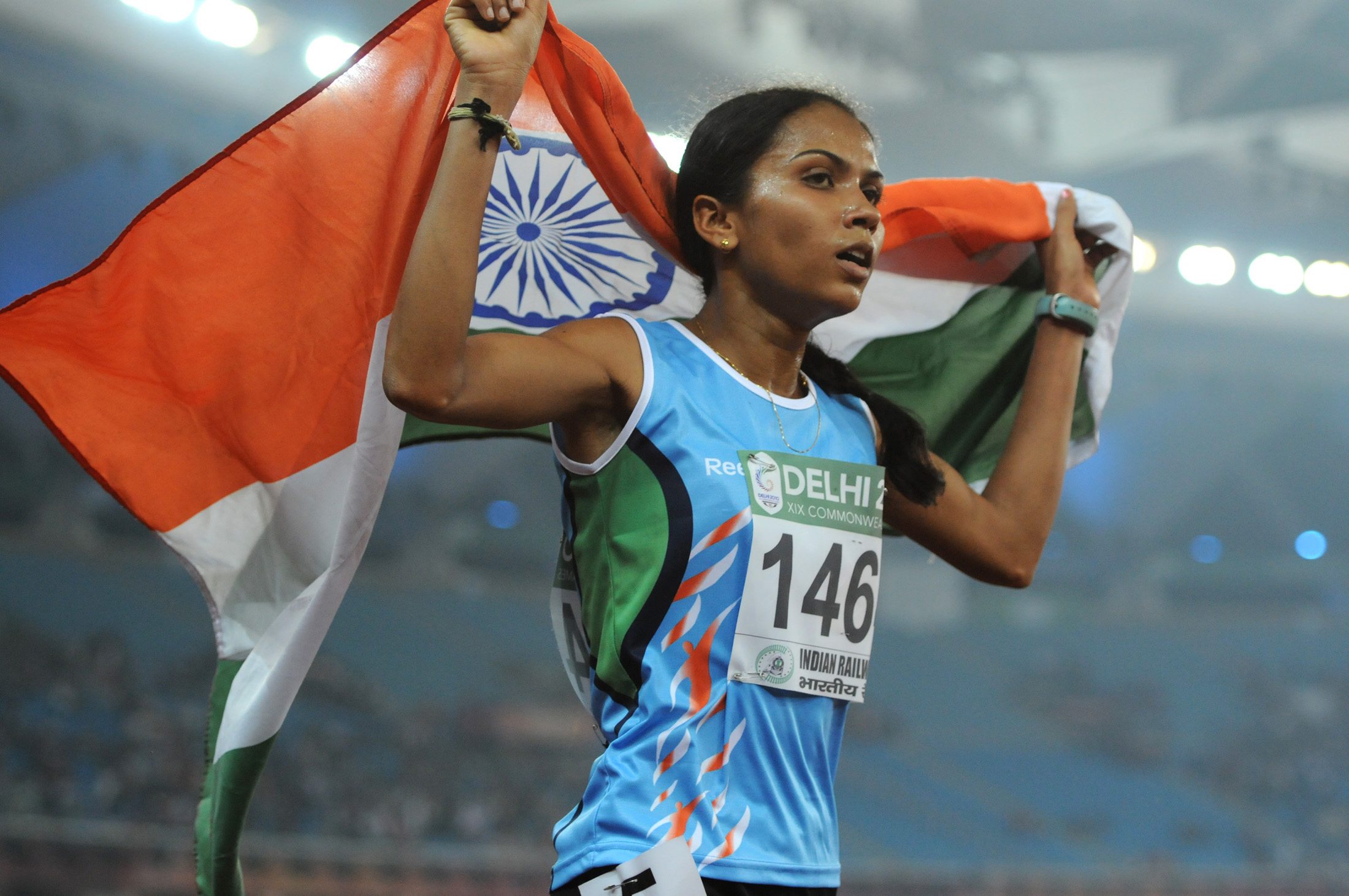
XIX Commonwealth Games-2010 Delhi (Women's) Athletics 10000m Final, Kavita Raut of India won the silver medal, at Jawaharlal Nehru Stadium, in New Delhi on October 08, 2010

Kavita Tungar (née Raut, born 5 May 1985) is an Indian long-distance runner from Nashik, Maharashtra. She holds the current national record for 10 km road running with a timing of 34:32 as well as the current national record in the half marathon with a timing of 1:12:50. She won the bronze medal in 10,000 metres race at the 2010 Commonwealth Games, the first individual track medal by an Indian woman athlete at the Commonwealth Games. She also won the silver medal in 10,000 metres race at the 2010 Asian Games.

== Biography ==
Kavita Raut was born in a tribal family on 09 dec 1985 in Sawarpada, a village near Harsul, Nashik in Maharashtra state, India. She is employed with Oil and Natural Gas Corporation (ONGC) and is married to Mahesh Tungar. She is known as 'Savarpada Express'.

== Career ==
Raut won a bronze medal at the 2009 Asian athletics championships held at Guangzhou, China. She won another bronze medal in the 10,000 metres race at the 2010 Commonwealth Games held at New Delhi on 8 October 2010 with a timing of 33:05.28. The medal was the first individual track medal by an Indian athlete at the Commonwealth Games in more than 50 years, after Milkha Singh's 440 yards gold at the 1958 Cardiff Commonwealth Games. It was also the first individual track medal by an Indian woman athlete in the history of Commonwealth Games.

She also won the silver medal in the 10,000 metres race at the 2010 Asian Games held at Guangzhou, China on 21 November 2010 with a timing of 31:51.44, which is her personal best. The medal was a double victory for India, as Preeja Sreedharan won the gold in the same event with a timing of 31:50.47 setting a record for India's best.

She started the following season with a 5000/10,000 m double at the 2011 National Games of India, setting Games records in both events.

Tungar holds the current Indian National record for 10 km road running with a mark of 34:32, set at the Sunfeast World 10K in Bangalore. She is a recipient of Arjuna Award.

Tungar received the Arjuna Award in 2012 and the Suvarnaratna Award in 2015.
