= 2013 Asian Athletics Championships – Men's 10,000 metres =

The men's 10,000 metres at the 2013 Asian Athletics Championships was held at the Shree Shiv Chhatrapati Sports Complex on 4 July.

== Results ==
Rank	Name	Nationality	Time	Notes
1st place, gold medalist(s)	Alemu Bekele	Bahrain	28:47.26	
2nd place, silver medalist(s)	Bilisuma Shugi	Bahrain	28:58.67	
3rd place, bronze medalist(s)	Ratiram Saini	India	29:35.42	
4	Kheta Ram	India	29:35.72	
5	Govindan Lakshmanan	India	30:46.45	
6	Emad Mahdi Abdullah	Yemen	33:20.85	
7	Mohammad Yaqout Karim	Afghanistan	34:39.91	
