= 2015 Asian Athletics Championships – Men's 5000 metres =

The men's 5000 metres event at the 2015 Asian Athletics Championships was held on the 4 of June.

== Results ==
Rank	Name	Nationality	Result	Notes
1st place, gold medalist(s)	Mohamad Al-Garni	Qatar	13:34.47	CR
2nd place, silver medalist(s)	Albert Kibichii Rop	Bahrain	13:35.26	
3rd place, bronze medalist(s)	Govindan Lakshmanan	India	13:36.62	
4	Naohiro Domoto	Japan	13:38.98	
5	Duo Bujie	China	13:55.58	
6	Andrey Petrov	Uzbekistan	14:17.48	
7	Shin Hyun-su	South Korea	14:17.60	
8	Chaminda Indika Wijekoon	Sri Lanka	14:23.77	
9	Lal Bahadur Thapa	Nepal	14:43.27	
	Bilisuma Shugi	Bahrain	DNF	
	Abdullah Al-Qwbani	Yemen	DNS	
	Abdullaziz Al-Abdi	Yemen	DNS	
