= Yuki Kawauchi =

Japanese marathon runner (born 1987)

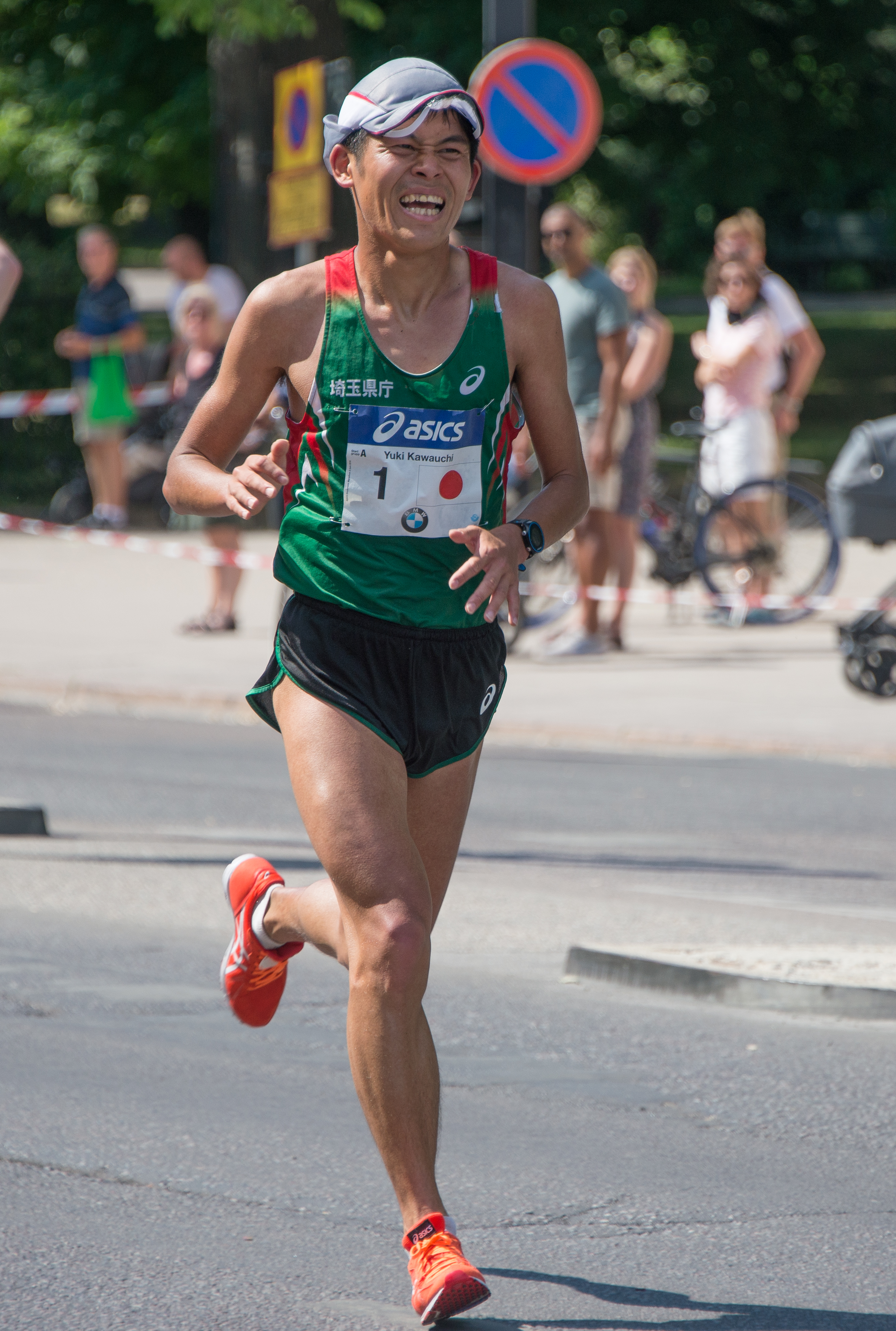
- Kawauchi in 2018

Personal information
- Born: 5 March 1987 (age 39) Setagaya-ku, Tokyo, Japan
- Height: 1.75 m (5 ft 9 in)
- Weight: 62 kg (137 lb; 9.8 st)

Sport
- Country: Japan

Achievements and titles
- Personal bests: Half marathon: 1:02:13; Marathon: 2:07:27
Medal record
Representing Japan
World Marathon Majors
Gold medal – first place	2018 Boston	Marathon
World Athletics Championships
Silver medal – second place	2011 Daegu	Team
Asian Games
Bronze medal – third place	2014 Incheon	Marathon

Yuki Kawauchi (川内優輝, Kawauchi Yūki; born 5 March 1987) is a Japanese marathon runner. He came to prominence after running the 2011 Tokyo Marathon in 2:08:37, finishing as the first Japanese citizen and third overall. He was known as the "citizen runner" given that he used to work full-time for the government of Saitama Prefecture and trained in his time off with his own expenses without any sponsorship. Kawauchi won the 2018 Boston Marathon. In 2020, he left his job in local government and became a full-time professional runner.

Kawauchi is a frequent competitor, entering many races each year (averaging a marathon per month) ranging in distance from the 1500 m to the 50 km ultramarathon. Among his better performances are victories at the Boston Marathon, the Hokkaido Marathon and the Beppu-Ōita Marathon and top-three finishes at the Tokyo Marathon and Fukuoka Marathon (the two most important marathons in Japan). His personal best for the distance is 2:07:27 (Lake Biwa 2021). Guinness World Records has recognized Kawauchi for becoming the first person to run more than 100 sub-2:20 marathons.

In spite of being an amateur, he has represented Japan internationally at the World Championships in Athletics and the IAAF World Half Marathon Championships. He has two younger brothers, Yoshiki and Koki Kawauchi, who are also marathon runners.

== Career ==
=== Early years ===
Born in Setagaya, Tokyo, Kawauchi began running from a young age: first he practiced with his mother and later with the track teams at high school. While he was there, the combination of an injury and the premature death of his father limited his running. Nevertheless, he continued to enjoy the sport at a lower level while studying at Gakushuin University. After graduation, he did not receive much interest from corporate running teams–-the typical route to professional running in Japan. He decided to continue running for pleasure, entering races and paying his own expenses.

He finished third at the 2008 Ageo Half Marathon in a time of 1:03:22 and began to compete in marathons the following year. He gradually improved his times in 2009. In his debut at the Beppu-Ōita Marathon, he finished 20th in 2:19:26. He bettered this with a time of 2:18:18 for 19th at the Tokyo Marathon a month later, then managed 13th at the Fukuoka Marathon in December in a time of 2:17:33. He began to break into the upper echelons of the national scene at the 2010 Tokyo Marathon, where he claimed fourth place in a personal-best time of 2:12:36. Despite this improvement, he was further down the field at the Fukuoka race, finishing tenth in 2:17:54.

=== 2011 season ===
Kawauchi improved his half-marathon best to 1:02:40 at the Kagawa Marugame Half Marathon in February 2011, finishing in the top 10. He set his sights on a top-eight finish at the Tokyo Marathon later that month but exceeded his own expectations by running a time of 2:08:37 and taking third place. As the best Japanese performer, he earned selection for the 2011 World Championships in Athletics.

In June, he entered the Okinoshima Ultramarathon and led the 50 km race right up to the last 600 metres, at which point he collapsed due to heat stroke. He failed to finish. At the World Championship Marathon held in Daegu he finished 18th-–a performance that helped the Japanese team including Hiroyuki Horibata and Kentaro Nakamoto to a silver medal in the 2011 World Marathon Cup. He competed extensively toward the end of the year and his form held: he managed fourth at the Osaka Marathon, then took third at the Fukuoka Marathon. The latter was an Olympic qualifying race, and he was the highest-finishing Japanese. The Japan Association of Athletics Federations played down his selection choices, saying that his time of 2:09:57 was not fast enough, but Kawauchi upturned tradition by saying the race was a warm-up for the second qualifier in Tokyo. (Japanese runners rarely enter both selection races due to their proximity in the running calendar.) Only two weeks later, Kawauchi entered the Hofu Marathon and was runner-up behind Mongolia's Serod Bat-Ochir. He remarked that the fatigue from the previous race had hurt his chances of winning.

=== 2012 season ===
At the start of 2012, Kawauchi ran a half-marathon best of 1:02:18 in Marugame, but his unorthodox decision to race frequently ruined his chances of Olympic selection, as he finished fourteenth with a time of 2:12:51 at February's Tokyo Marathon. He called his own performance "disgraceful" and shaved his head to make amends for disappointing his supporters. This did not deter Kawauchi from following his own running plan, however, and he entered nine marathons that year, winning five of them. He took the top honors at the Kasumigaura Marathon, Hokkaido Marathon, Sydney Marathon, Chiba Aqualine Marathon and Hofu Marathon. Kawauchi's return to Okinoshima produced a course-record victory in 2:51:45 at the 50 km race. On top of his marathon running, Kawauchi ran six half-marathons, including top-three finishes in Shizuoka and Ageo as well as 21st place at the 2012 IAAF World Half Marathon Championships. Following the advice of the late New Zealand running coach Arthur Lydiard, he said that focusing on distance work would improve his speed, rather than the inverse speed training favored by his contemporaries. Demonstrating this philosophy, he ran personal bests for the 1500 meters and the 5000 meters in September, recording times of 3:50.51 and 13:58.62 at a Nittai University track meet.

Kawauchi's fastest marathon time of the year was 2:10:29, which earned him sixth place at the Fukuoka Marathon. Repeating his schedule from the previous year, he ran in Hofu two weeks later; this time he won the race. His 2:10:46 gave him the record for the shortest period of time between two sub-2:11 marathons by any runner. Responding to questions about his frequent racing, he said that he wanted "to find out whether the common sense of the running world is really any kind of sense at all."

=== 2013 season ===
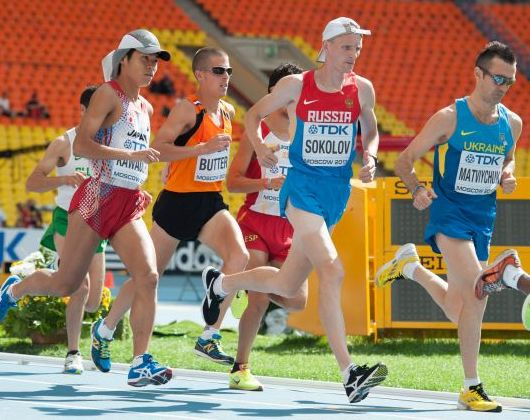
Kawauchi (left) at the 2013 World Championships.

The organizers of the 2013 Egyptian Marathon agreed to pay his travel expenses for the January race, but Kawauchi missed his flight after arriving at the airport without his passport. He decided to pay 800,000 yen (US$9,000) for a replacement flight – an amount that equated to a quarter of his yearly salary. The decision paid off as he reached the starting line for the marathon and won with a time of 2:12:24—the fastest ever for a race in Egypt. Less than three weeks later he ran at the Beppu-Ōita Marathon and reached the top of the Japanese rankings by winning the race in a personal best of 2:08:15, breaking Gert Thys's 17-year-old course record in the process. In spite of the many races, his passion was not dimmed: "after 21 Marathon runs, I can now say with confidence how fun Marathon running can be". He beat a number of professional runners at the Kumanichi 30 km Road Race two weeks later, finishing in 1:29:31—another course record and a personal-best time. The race organizers said a 30,000 increase in spectators that year was due to Kawauchi's popularity with the Japanese public: the runner had received invitations to more than 100 races.

Kawauchi achieved further success in 2013. He broke his personal best by one second with a fourth-place finish at the Seoul International Marathon. Cold conditions at the Nagano Marathon put a stop to an attempt to be the first person to run three sub-2:09 marathons in consecutive months, but he still managed to win the race, becoming the first Japanese winner since 1999. He equalled Nicholas Manza's course record to win the Gold Coast Marathon in July.

=== 2018 Boston Marathon ===
Kawauchi won the 2018 Boston Marathon with a time of 2:15:58, becoming the first Japanese winner since Toshihiko Seko in 1987. After leading early at world record pace and repeatedly surging throughout the race, at mile 25 Kawauchi passed defending champion Geoffrey Kirui to achieve his first major marathon win. He overcame extremely difficult weather conditions, including heavy rain, strong headwinds, and temperatures near 40 °F (4 °C) throughout the race. Despite this, he attributed his victory to those conditions, stating that "for me, these are the best conditions possible." Kawauchi's Boston win was his world record 79th marathon under 2:20:00. After returning to Japan following his Boston Marathon win, Kawauchi told reporters that he would quit his job as a high school administration office worker and turn pro in April 2019.

== International competitions ==
Representing Japan
Year	Competition	Venue	Position	Event	Notes
2011	World Championships	Daegu, South Korea	18th	Marathon	2:16:11
2011	World Championships	Daegu, South Korea	2nd	Team	6:41:13
2012	World Half Marathon Championships	Kavarna, Bulgaria	21st	Half marathon	1:04:04
2012	World Half Marathon Championships	Kavarna, Bulgaria	9th	Team	3:14:33
2013	World Championships	Moscow, Russia	18th	Marathon	2:15:35
2014	Asian Games	Incheon, South Korea	3rd	Marathon	2:12:42
2017	World Championships	London, United Kingdom	9th	Marathon	2:12:19
2019	World Championships	Doha, Qatar	29th	Marathon	2:17:59

== Half Marathon results through 2018 ==
Year	Competition	Venue	Position	Event	Notes
2007	National University Half Marathon	Tokyo, Japan	63rd	Half Marathon	1:05:39
2007	Kanto Region University Half Marathon Div. 2	Tokyo, Japan	3rd	Half Marathon	1:05:40
2008	National University Half Marathon	Tokyo, Japan	6th	Half Marathon	1:03:38
2008	Kanto Region University Half Marathon Div. 2	Tokyo, Japan	9th	Half Marathon	1:05:43
2008	Ageo City Half Marathon	Saitama, Japan	3rd	Half Marathon	1:03:22
2009	National University Half Marathon	Tokyo, Japan	15th	Half Marathon	1:03:13
2009	Ageo City Half Marathon	Saitama, Japan	14th	Half Marathon	1:04:45
2010	Tanigawa Mari Half Marathon	Tokyo, Japan	1st	Half Marathon	1:06:49
2010	Kagawa Marugame International Half Marathon	Kagawa, Japan	28th	Half Marathon	1:03:28
2010	Sendai International Half Marathon	Miyagi, Japan	14th	Half Marathon	1:05:08
2010	Ageo City Half Marathon	Saitama, Japan	13th	Half Marathon	1:03:48
2011	Kagawa Marugame International Half Marathon	Kagawa, Japan	9th	Half Marathon	1:02:40
2011	Gifu Seiryu Half Marathon	Gifu, Japan	13th	Half Marathon	1:04:44
2011	Sapporo International Half Marathon	Hokkaido, Japan	63rd	Half Marathon	1:07:12
2011	Shibetsu Half Marathon	Hokkaido, Japan	4th	Half Marathon	1:06:24
2011	Ageo City Half Marathon	Saitama, Japan	18th	Half Marathon	1:04:13
2012	Tanigawa Mari Half Marathon	Tokyo, Japan	2nd	Half Marathon	1:06:19
2012	Kagawa Marugame International Half Marathon	Kagawa, Japan	27th	Half Marathon	1:02:18
2012	Saitama City Half Marathon	Saitama, Japan	1st	Half Marathon	1:04:29
2012	Yaizu Minato Half Marathon	Shizuoka, Japan	2nd	Half Marathon	1:03:48
2012	Sendai International Half Marathon	Miyagi, Japan	4th	Half Marathon	1:03:49
2012	Gifu Seiryu Half Marathon	Gifu, Japan	12th	Half Marathon	1:04:13
2012	Kurobe Meisui Half Marathon	Toyama, Japan	2nd	Half Marathon	1:05:38
2012	Sakuranbo Half Marathon	Yamagata, Japan	1st	Half Marathon	1:05:34
2012	Shibetsu Half Marathon	Hokkaido, Japan	1st	Half Marathon	1:05:00
2012	Nihonkai Melon Half Marathon	Akita, Japan	1st	Half Marathon	1:06:15
2012	World Half Marathon Championships	Kavarna, Bulgaria	21st	Half marathon	1:04:04
2012	Joshu Ota Subaru Half Marathon	Saitama, Japan	1st	Half Marathon	1:05:55
2012	Ageo City Half Marathon	Saitama, Japan	3rd	Half Marathon	1:03:02
2013	Tanigawa Mari Half Marathon	Tokyo, Japan	1st	Half Marathon	1:05:31
2013	Kanaguri Hai Tamana Half Marathon	Kumamoto, Japan	2nd	Half Marathon	1:03:12
2013	Saitama City Half Marathon	Saitama, Japan	1st	Half Marathon	1:05:52
2013	Honjo Waseda no Mori Half Marathon	Saitama, Japan	1st	Half Marathon	1:06:28
2013	Kasukabe Odako Half Marathon	Saitama, Japan	10th	Half Marathon	no time recorded
2013	Toyohiragawa Half Marathon	Hokkaido, Japan	1st	Half Marathon	1:05:45
2013	Sendai International Half Marathon	Miyagi, Japan	10th	Half Marathon	1:03:30
2013	Gifu Seiryu Half Marathon	Gifu, Japan	14th	Half Marathon	1:05:05
2013	Kurobe Meisui Half Marathon	Toyama, Japan	1st	Half Marathon	1:03:58
2013	Shibetsu Half Marathon	Hokkaido, Japan	22nd	Half Marathon	1:06:45
2013	Great North Run Half Marathon	United Kingdom	8th	Half Marathon	1:04:08
2013	Hakodate Half Marathon	Hokkaido, Japan	4th	Half Marathon	1:04:51
2013	Hirosaki Shirakami Apple Half Marathon	Aomori, Japan	1st	Half Marathon	1:04:42
2013	Inawashiroko Half Marathon	Fukushima, Japan	1st	Half Marathon	1:07:53
2013	Ageo City Half Marathon	Saitama, Japan	20th	Half Marathon	1:03:06
2013	Koedo Kawagoe Half Marathon	Saitama, Japan	1st	Half Marathon	1:04:44
2014	Tanigawa Mari Half Marathon	Tokyo, Japan	2nd	Half Marathon	1:04:17
2014	Okukuma Road Race	Kumamoto, Japan	2nd	Half Marathon	1:03:40
2014	Nagoya City Half Marathon	Aichi, Japan	2nd	Half Marathon	1:04:17
2014	Saitama City Half Marathon	Saitama, Japan	1st	Half Marathon	1:04:49
2014	Ogori Road Race	Fukuoka, Japan	1st	Half Marathon	1:05:21
2014	Incheon International Half Marathon	Incheon, South Korea	5th	Half Marathon	1:06:04
2014	Yaizu Minato Half Marathon	Shizuoka, Japan	9th	Half Marathon	1:04:19
2014	Sendai International Half Marathon	Miyagi, Japan	4th	Half Marathon	1:03:23
2014	Gifu Seiryu Half Marathon	Gifu, Japan	11th	Half Marathon	1:03:48
2014	Nihonkai Melon Half Marathon	Akita, Japan	1st	Half Marathon	1:06:28
2014	Hoppo Ryodo Nosappu Misaki Half Marathon	Hokkaido, Japan	1st	Half Marathon	1:06:12
2014	Kitami Half Marathon	Hokkaido, Japan	1st	Half Marathon	1:04:33
2014	Chiba Aqualine Half Marathon	Chiba, Japan	1st	Half Marathon	1:04:22
2014	Ageo City Half Marathon	Saitama, Japan	10th	Half Marathon	1:02:55
2014	Koedo Kawagoe Half Marathon	Saitama, Japan	2nd	Half Marathon	1:03:39
2015	Okukuma Road Race	Kumamoto, Japan	9th	Half Marathon	1:04:44
2015	Fukaya City Half Marathon	Saitama, Japan	43rd	Half Marathon	1:13:36
2015	Tachikawa City Half Marathon	Tokyo, Japan	47th	Half Marathon	1:07:19
2015	Kanaguri Hai Tamana Half Marathon	Kumamoto, Japan	24th	Half Marathon	1:06:37
2015	Kumagaya Sakura Half Marathon	Saitama, Japan	1st	Half Marathon	1:04:41
2015	Nerima Kobushi Half Marathon	Tokyo, Japan	1st	Half Marathon	1:05:39
2015	Honjo Waseda no Mori Half Marathon	Saitama, Japan	1st	Half Marathon	1:07:47
2015	Sado Toki Half Marathon	Niigata, Japan	1st	Half Marathon	1:06:16
2015	Asagiriko Half Marathon	Ehime, Japan	1st	Half Marathon	1:07:23
2015	Kasukabe Odako Half Marathon	Saitama, Japan	1st	Half Marathon	1:07:03
2015	Toyohiragawa Half Marathon	Hokkaido, Japan	1st	Half Marathon	1:09:23
2015	Sendai International Half Marathon	Miyagi, Japan	30th	Half Marathon	1:08:36
2015	Gifu Seiryu Half Marathon	Gifu, Japan	24th	Half Marathon	1:06:16
2015	Venus Half Marathon	Gifu, Japan	1st	Half Marathon	1:10:39
2015	Okushiri Moonlight Half Marathon	Hokkaido, Japan	1st	Half Marathon	1:05:04
2015	Hoppo Ryodo Nosappu Misaki Half Marathon	Hokkaido, Japan	1st	Half Marathon	1:07:01
2015	Nijuken Doro Half Marathon	Hokkaido, Japan	1st	Half Marathon	1:05:32
2015	Ageo City Half Marathon	Saitama, Japan	5th	Half Marathon	1:03:11
2016	Okukuma Road Race	Kumamoto, Japan	2nd	Half Marathon	1:04:00
2016	Kuki Half Marathon	Saitama, Japan	3rd	Half Marathon	1:06:42 – wearing 3-piece suit
2016	Nerima Kobushi Half Marathon	Tokyo, Japan	1st	Half Marathon	1:05:32
2016	Yaizu Minato Half Marathon	Shizuoka, Japan	1st	Half Marathon	1:03:47
2016	Kawauchi no Sato Kaeru Half Marathon	Fukushima, Japan	1st	Half Marathon	1:05:42
2016	Sendai International Half Marathon	Miyagi, Japan	5th	Half Marathon	1:04:35
2016	Gifu Seiryu Half Marathon	Gifu, Japan	11th	Half Marathon	1:03:39
2016	Hakodate Half Marathon	Hokkaido, Japan	5th	Half Marathon	1:04:24
2016	Shibetsu Half Marathon	Hokkaido, Japan	16th	Half Marathon	1:06:10
2016	Hoppo Ryodo Nosappu Misaki Half Marathon	Hokkaido, Japan	1st	Half Marathon	1:05:34
2016	Imabari Half Marathon	Ehime, Japan	1st	Half Marathon	1:06:32
2016	Chiba Aqualine Half Marathon	Chiba, Japan	2nd	Half Marathon	1:06:26
2016	Ageo City Half Marathon	Saitama, Japan	973rd	Half Marathon	1:34:26
2017	Ikinoshima Half Marathon	Nagasaki, Japan	1st	Half Marathon	1:06:35
2017	Okukuma Road Race	Kumamoto, Japan	6th	Half Marathon	1:04:17
2017	Soja Kibiji Half Marathon	Okayama, Japan	2nd	Half Marathon	1:04:52
2017	Kanaguri Hai Tamana Half Marathon	Kumamoto, Japan	3rd	Half Marathon	1:03:19
2017	Tanegashima Rocket Half Marathon	Kagoshima, Japan	1st	Half Marathon	1:04:43
2017	Kuki Half Marathon	Saitama, Japan	1st	Half Marathon	1:05:03 – wore his JHS uniform
2017	Kamisatomachi Kenmu Half Marathon	Saitama, Japan	1st	Half Marathon	1:05:33
2017	Gifu Seiryu Half Marathon	Gifu, Japan	15th	Half Marathon	1:04:06
2017	Kawauchi no Sato Kaeru Half Marathon	Fukushima, Japan	1st	Half Marathon	1:05:31
2017	Sendai International Half Marathon	Miyagi, Japan	11th	Half Marathon	1:03:29
2017	Kinshuko Half Marathon	Iwate, Japan	1st	Half Marathon	1:05:22
2017	Asahikawa Half Marathon	Hokkaido, Japan	1st	Half Marathon	1:05:06
2017	Ageo City Half Marathon	Saitama, Japan	18th	Half Marathon	1:03:35
2017	Ogawa Washi Half Marathon	Saitama, Japan	1st	Half Marathon	1:04:05
2018	Okukuma Road Race	Kumamoto, Japan	7th	Half Marathon	1:03:28
2018	Fukaya City Half Marathon	Saitama, Japan	1st	Half Marathon	1:04:26
2018	Kanaguri Hai Tamana Half Marathon	Kumamoto, Japan	12th	Half Marathon	1:04:49
2018	Yoshinogawa Riverside Half Marathon	Tokushima, Japan	1st	Half Marathon	1:05:50
2018	Kuki Half Marathon	Saitama, Japan	2nd	Half Marathon	1:10:03 – wore panda costume
2018	Gifu Seiryu Half Marathon	Gifu, Japan	14th	Half Marathon	1:04:35
2018	Kawauchi no Sato Kaeru Half Marathon	Fukushima, Japan	1st	Half Marathon	1:05:56
2018	Kasukabe Otako Half Marathon	Saitama, Japan	2nd	Half Marathon	1:05:45
2018	Toyohiragawa Half Marathon	Hokkaido, Japan	1st	Half Marathon	1:06:39
2018	Sendai International Half Marathon	Miyagi, Japan	7th	Half Marathon	1:03:41
2018	Kinshuko Half Marathon	Iwate, Japan	1st	Half Marathon	1:07:49
2018	Nemuro Seaside Half Marathon	Hokkaido, Japan	1st	Half Marathon	1:06:39

== Marathon results ==
Year	Competition	Venue	Position	Event	Notes
2009	Beppu-Oita Mainichi Marathon	Oita, Japan	20th	Marathon	2:19:26
2009	Tokyo Marathon	Tokyo, Japan	19th	Marathon	2:18:18
2009	Fukuoka International Marathon	Fukuoka, Japan	13th	Marathon	2:17:33
2010	Tokyo Marathon	Tokyo, Japan	4th	Marathon	2:12:36
2010	Fukuoka International Marathon	Fukuoka, Japan	10th	Marathon	2:17:56
2011	Tokyo Marathon	Tokyo, Japan	3rd	Marathon	2:08:37
2011	World Championships	Daegu, South Korea	18th	Marathon	2:16:11
2011	Osaka Marathon	Osaka, Japan	4th	Marathon	2:14:31
2011	Fukuoka International Marathon	Fukuoka, Japan	3rd	Marathon	2:09:57
2011	Hofu Yomiuri Marathon	Hōfu, Japan	2nd	Marathon	2:12:33
2012	Tokyo Marathon	Tokyo, Japan	14th	Marathon	2:12:51
2012	Kasumigaura Marathon	Kasumigaura, Japan	1st	Marathon	2:22:38
2012	Düsseldorf Marathon	Düsseldorf, Germany	8th	Marathon	2:12:58
2012	Gold Coast Marathon	Gold Coast, Australia	4th	Marathon	2:13:26
2012	Hokkaido Marathon	Sapporo, Japan	1st	Marathon	2:18:38
2012	Sydney Marathon	Sydney, Australia	1st	Marathon	2:11:52
2012	Chiba Aqualine Marathon	Chiba, Japan	1st	Marathon	2:17:48
2012	Fukuoka International Marathon	Fukuoka, Japan	6th	Marathon	2:10:29
2012	Hofu Yomiuri Marathon	Hofu, Japan	1st	Marathon	2:10:46
2013	Luxor Marathon	Luxor, Egypt	1st	Marathon	2:12:24
2013	Beppu-Oita Mainichi Marathon	Oita, Japan	1st	Marathon	2:08:15
2013	Seoul International Marathon	Seoul, South Korea	4th	Marathon	2:08:14
2013	Nagano Marathon	Nagano, Japan	1st	Marathon	2:14:27
2013	Chitose Marathon	Chitose, Japan	1st	Marathon	2:18:29
2013	Gold Coast Marathon	Gold Coast, Australia	1st	Marathon	2:10:01
2013	World Championships	Moscow, Russia	18th	Marathon	2:15:35
2013	Melbourne Marathon	Melbourne, Australia	2nd	Marathon	2:11:40
2013	New York City Marathon	New York City, United States	11th	Marathon	2:12:29
2013	Fukuoka International Marathon	Fukuoka, Japan	3rd	Marathon	2:09:05
2013	Hofu Yomiuri Marathon	Hofu, Japan	2nd	Marathon	2:09:15
2014	Kumamotojo Marathon	Kumamoto, Japan	1st	Marathon	2:10:14
2014	Lake Biwa Mainichi Marathon	Ōtsu, Japan	4th	Marathon	2:10:38
2014	Saga Sakura Marathon	Saga, Japan	1st	Marathon	2:13:02
2014	Tokushima Marathon	Tokushima, Japan	1st	Marathon	2:15:25
2014	Hamburg Marathon	Hamburg, Germany	9th	Marathon	2:09:36
2014	Chitose Marathon	Chitose, Japan	1st	Marathon	2:15:57
2014	Gold Coast Marathon	Gold Coast, Australia	3rd	Marathon	2:11:27
2014	City to Surf Marathon	Perth, Australia	1st	Marathon	2:12:55
2014	Asian Games	Incheon, South Korea	3rd	Marathon	2:12:42
2014	New York City Marathon	New York City, United States	11th	Marathon	2:16:41
2014	Fukuchiyama Marathon	Fukuchiyama, Japan	1st	Marathon	2:12:59
2014	Naha Marathon	Naha, Japan	1st	Marathon	2:13:43
2014	Hofu Yomiuri Marathon	Hofu, Japan	1st	Marathon	2:09:46
2015	Ibusuki Nanohana Marathon	Ibusuki, Japan	1st	Marathon	2:24:10
2015	Nobeoka Nishi Nippon Marathon	Nobeoka, Japan	8th	Marathon	2:15:16
2015	Kochi Ryoma Marathon	Kochi, Japan	1st	Marathon	2:15:06
2015	Seoul International Marathon	Seoul, South Korea	16th	Marathon	2:13:33
2015	Zurich Marathon	Zurich, Switzerland	2nd	Marathon	2:12:12
2015	Kurobe Meisui Marathon	Kurobe, Japan	1st	Marathon	2:17:58
2015	Gold Coast Marathon	Gold Coast, Australia	8th	Marathon	2:16:23
2015	City to Surf Marathon	Perth, Australia	1st	Marathon	2:16:23
2015	Cape Town Marathon	Cape Town, South Africa	9th	Marathon	2:16:33
2015	Iwate Kitakami Marathon	Kitakami, Japan	1st	Marathon	2:13:21
2015	New York City Marathon	New York City, United States	6th	Marathon	2:13:29
2015	Fukuoka International Marathon	Fukuoka, Japan	8th	Marathon	2:12:48
2015	Hofu Yomiuri Marathon	Hofu, Japan	2nd	Marathon	2:12:24
2016	Ibusuki Nanohana Marathon	Ibusuki, Japan	1st	Marathon	2:15:14
2016	Lake Biwa Mainichi Marathon	Ōtsu, Japan	7th	Marathon	2:11:53
2016	New Taipei City Wan Jin Shi Marathon	New Taipei City, Taiwan	2nd	Marathon	2:14:12
2016	Zurich Marathon	Zurich, Switzerland	1st	Marathon	2:12:04
2016	Gold Coast Marathon	Gold Coast, Australia	2nd	Marathon	2:09:01
2016	Berlin Marathon	Berlin, Germany	13th	Marathon	2:11:03
2016	Porto Marathon	Porto, Portugal	2nd	Marathon	2:14:32
2016	Fukuoka International Marathon	Fukuoka, Japan	3rd	Marathon	2:09:11
2016	Hofu Yomiuri Marathon	Hofu, Japan	3rd	Marathon	2:12:45
2017	Ehime Marathon	Ehime, Japan	1st	Marathon	2:09:54
2017	Daegu Marathon	Daegu, South Korea	6th	Marathon	2:13:04
2017	Prague Marathon	Prague, Czech Republic	6th	Marathon	2:10:13
2017	Stockholm Marathon	Stockholm, Sweden	6th	Marathon	2:14:04
2017	Gold Coast Marathon	Gold Coast, Australia	3rd	Marathon	2:09:18
2017	World Championships	London, United Kingdom	9th	Marathon	2:12:19
2017	Oslo Marathon	Oslo, Norway	1st	Marathon	2:15:58
2017	Betsukai Pilot Marathon	Betsukai, Hokkaido	1st	Marathon	2:13:43
2017	Marathon des Alpes-Maritimes Nice-Cannes	Nice, France	6th	Marathon	2:15:02
2017	Saitama International Marathon	Saitama, Japan	1st	Marathon	2:15:54
2017	Fukuoka International Marathon	Fukuoka, Japan	9th	Marathon	2:10:53
2017	Hofu Yomiuri Marathon	Hofu, Japan	1st	Marathon	2:10:03
2018	Marshfield Road Runners New Years Day Marathon	Marshfield, United States	1st	Marathon	2:18:59
2018	Kitakyushu Marathon	Kitakyushu, Japan	1st	Marathon	2:11:46
2018	New Taipei City Wan Jin Shi Marathon	New Taipei City, Taiwan	1st	Marathon	2:14:12
2018	Boston Marathon	Boston, Massachusetts	1st	Marathon	2:15:58
2018	Stockholm Marathon	Stockholm, Sweden	4th	Marathon	2:22:57
2018	Gold Coast Marathon	Gold Coast, Australia	9th	Marathon	2:14:51
2018	New Caledonia International Marathon	Nouméa, New Caledonia	1st	Marathon	2:18:18
2018	Wakkanai Heiwa Marathon	Wakkanai, Hokkaido	2nd	Marathon	2:24:55
2018	Chicago Marathon	Chicago, United States	19th	Marathon	2:16:26
2018	Venice Marathon	Venice	7th	Marathon	2:27:43
2018	Fukuoka International Marathon	Fukuoka, Japan	10th	Marathon	2:12:03
2018	Hofu Yomiuri Marathon	Hofu, Japan	1st	Marathon	2:11:29
2019	Ibusuki Nanohana Marathon	Ibusuki, Japan	1st	Marathon	2:14:21
2019	Shizuoka Marathon	Shizuoka, Japan	1st	Marathon	2:13:41
2019	Lake Biwa Mainichi Marathon	Ōtsu, Japan	8th	Marathon	2:09:21
2019	Boston Marathon	Boston, Massachusetts	17th	Marathon	2:15:29
2019	Vancouver Marathon	Vancouver, British Columbia	1st	Marathon	2:15:01
2019	Gold Coast Marathon	Gold Coast, Australia	13th	Marathon	2:15:32
2019	New Caledonia International Marathon	Nouméa, New Caledonia	1st	Marathon	2:17:24
2019	Wakkanai Heiwa Marathon	Wakkanai, Hokkaido	1st	Marathon	2:20:28
2019	World Championships	Doha, Qatar	29th	Marathon	2:17:59
2019	Fukuoka International Marathon	Fukuoka, Japan	12th	Marathon	2:12:50
2019	Hofu Yomiuri Marathon	Hōfu, Japan	7th	Marathon	2:14:17
2020	Marrakech Marathon	Marrakesh, Morocco	23rd	Marathon	2:17:26
2020	Lake Biwa Mainichi Marathon	Ōtsu, Japan	25th	Marathon	2:14:33
2020	Fukuoka International Marathon	Fukuoka, Japan	19th	Marathon	2:13:59
2020	Hofu Yomiuri Marathon	Hōfu, Japan	2nd	Marathon	2:10:26
2021	Lake Biwa Mainichi Marathon	Ōtsu, Japan	10th	Marathon	2:07:27
2021	Fukuoka International Marathon	Fukuoka, Japan	12th	Marathon	2:11:33
2021	Hofu Yomiuri Marathon	Hōfu, Japan	3rd	Marathon	2:10:11
2022	Osaka Marathon	Osaka, Japan	9th	Marathon	2:08:49
2022	Boston Marathon	Boston, Massachusetts	20th	Marathon	2:12:55
2022	Gold Coast Marathon	Gold Coast, Australia		Marathon	3:57:39
2022	Wakkanai Peace Marathon	Wakkanai, Japan	2nd	Marathon	2:22:18
2022	Matsumoto Marathon	Matsumoto, Nagano, Japan	1st	Marathon	2:20:25
2022	Hofu Yomiuri Marathon	Hōfu, Japan	17th	Marathon	2:16:38
2022	Mie Matsusaka Marathon	Matsusaka, Japan	1st	Marathon	2:16:31
2023	Ishigakijima Marathon	Ishigaki, Okinawa, Japan	1st	Marathon	2:18:05
2023	Osaka Marathon	Osaka, Japan	12th	Marathon	2:07:35
2023	Saga Sakura Marathon	Saga, Japan	1st	Marathon	2:11:32
2023	London Marathon	London, United Kingdom	11th	Marathon	2:13:18
2023	Vancouver Marathon	Vancouver, British Columbia	1st	Marathon	2:17:05
2023	Gold Coast Marathon	Gold Coast, Australia	7th	Marathon	2:12:35
2023	Wakkanai Peace Marathon	Wakkanai, Hokkaido	1st	Marathon	2:24:51
2023	Tallinn Marathon	Tallinn, Estonia	5th	Marathon	2:14:07
2023	Marathon Grand Championship	Tokyo, Japan	4th	Marathon	2:09:18
2023	Tohoku Miyagi Revive marathon	Miyagi, Japan	1st	Marathon	2:11:48
2023	Hofu Yomiuri Marathon	Hofu, Japan	1st	Marathon	2:08:32
2023	Mie Matsusaka Marathon	Matsusaka, Japan	1st	Marathon	2:18:58
2024	Ibusuki Nanohana Marathon	Ibusuki, Japan	1st	Marathon	2:21:13
2024	Paris Marathon	Paris, France	75th	Marathon	2:31:03
2024	Gold Coast Marathon	Gold Coast, Australia	156th	Marathon	2:42:26
2024	Hofu Yomiuri Marathon	Hofu, Japan	38th	Marathon	2:33:01
2024	Mie Matsusaka Marathon	Matsusaka, Japan	6th	Marathon	2:22:02
2025	Kasumigaura Marathon	Kasumigaura, Japan	1st	Marathon	2:19:10
2025	Vancouver Marathon	Vancouver, British Columbia	3rd	Marathon	2:18:16
2025	Sydney Marathon	Sydney, Australia	29th	Marathon	2:21:08
2025	Niagara Falls Marathon	Niagara Falls, Canada	1st	Marathon	2:19:39
2025	Hofu Yomiuri Marathon	Hofu, Japan	21st	Marathon	2:16:41
2025	Matsusaka Marathon	Matsusaka, Japan	1st	Marathon	2:18:30
2026	Hong Kong Marathon	Hong Kong	16th	Marathon	2:19:52
2026	Osaka Marathon	Osaka, Japan	75th	Marathon	2:14:30
2026	Nagano Marathon	Nagano, Japan	741st	Marathon	3:14:02
2026	Maratón de Cali	Cali, Colombia	43rd	Marathon	2:45:40
2026	Gold Coast Marathon	Gold Coast, Australia	894th	Marathon	3:01:28
2026	Wakkanai Peace Marathon	Wakkanai, Japan	2nd	Marathon	2:25:40
2026	Almaty Marathon	Almaty, Kazakhstan	2nd	Marathon	2:18:55

== Ultramarathon results ==
Year	Competition	Venue	Position	Event	Notes
2011	Okinoshima Ultramarathon	Shimane, Japan	DNF	50 km	
2012	Okinoshima Ultramarathon	Shimane, Japan	1st	50 km	2:51:45
2013	Okinoshima Ultramarathon	Shimane, Japan	1st	50 km	2:57:28
2014	Okinoshima Ultramarathon	Shimane, Japan	1st	50 km	2:47:27
2015	Okinoshima Ultramarathon	Shimane, Japan	1st	50 km	2:48:23
2016	Okinoshima Ultramarathon	Shimane, Japan	1st	50 km	2:44:07
2017	Okinoshima Ultramarathon	Shimane, Japan	1st	50 km	2:47:35
2018	Yatsugatake Nobeyama Highland Ultramarathon	Nagano, Japan	1st	71 km	4:41:55
2018	Okinoshima Ultramarathon	Shimane, Japan	1st	50 km	2:52:55
2019	Okinoshima Ultramarathon	Shimane, Japan	1st	50 km	2:49:51

== Personal bests ==
- 1500 metres – 3:50.51 (2012)
- 3000 metres – 8:01.42 (2021)
- 5000 metres – 13:58.62 (2012)
- 10,000 metres – 29:02.33 (2010)
- 10 km – 28:53 (2022)
- 10 miles – 47:28 (2014)
- 20 km – 59:17 (2013)
- Half Marathon – 1:02:13 (2022)
- 30 km – 1:29:31 (2013)
- Marathon – 2:07:27 (2021)
- 50 km – 2:44:07 (2016) NR

== World records ==
- Shortest period of time (2 weeks) between two sub-2:10 marathons – 2:09:05 (2013), 2:09:15 (2013)
- Shortest period of time (6 weeks) between two sub-2:09 marathons – 2:08:15, 2:08:14 (2013)
- Most sub-2:16 marathons in one calendar year: 12 times (2014), (2017)
- Most career sub-2:11 marathons: 23 times
- Most career sub-2:20 marathons: 101 times
- Most career sub-3:00 50 km ultra marathons: 8 times
- Half marathon in a three-piece suit (uncertified course) – 1:06:42 (2016)

== Personal life ==
Kawauchi married fellow runner Yuko Mizuguchi in May 2019, about two weeks after they both won their gender class in the Vancouver Marathon.

Kawauchi has two younger brothers. He started running at the age of 7, by his mother Mika who used to run 800m and 1500m as a middle and high school student.
