= 2011 Asian Athletics Championships – Men's 10,000 metres =

The Men's 10,000 metres event at the 2011 Asian Athletics Championships took place on July 7, 2011, at the Kobe Universiade Memorial Stadium.

== Medalists ==
Gold	Ali Hasan Mahboob; Bahrain
Silver	Bilisuma Shugi Gelasa; Bahrain
Bronze	Akinobu Murasawa; Japan

== Records ==
World record	Kenenisa Bekele (ETH)	26:17.53	Brussels, Belgium	26 August 2005
Asian record	Abdullah Ahmad Hassan (QAT)	26:38.76	Brussels, Belgium	5 September 2003
Championship record	Ali Hasan Mahboob (BHR)	28:23.70	Guangzhou, China	2009

== Results ==
=== Final ===
The race was held at 20:10 local time.

Rank	Name	Nationality	Result	Notes
1st place, gold medalist(s)	Ali Hasan Mahboob	Bahrain	28:35.49	
2nd place, silver medalist(s)	Bilisuma Shugi Gelasa	Bahrain	28:36.30	
3rd place, bronze medalist(s)	Akinobu Murasawa	Japan	28:40.63	
4	Tsuyoshi Ugachi	Japan	28:48.53	
5	Suresh Kumar	India	29:37.62	
6	Ser-Od Bat-Ochir	Mongolia	29:44.84	
7	Kheta Ram	India	30:31.85	
–	Mohammad Khazaei	Iran	DNF	
