= Athletics at the 2018 Asian Games – Men's marathon =

Men's marathon at the 2018 Asian Games
- Venue: Gelora Bung Karno Stadium
- Date: 25 August 2018
- Competitors: 21 from 13 nations

Medalists
gold medal	Hiroto Inoue	Japan
silver medal	El-Hassan El-Abbassi	Bahrain
bronze medal	Duo Bujie	China

The men's marathon competition at the 2018 Asian Games took place on 25 August 2018 at the Gelora Bung Karno Stadium.

== Schedule ==
All times are Western Indonesia Time (UTC+07:00)

Date	Time	Event
Saturday, 25 August 2018	06:00	Final

== Records ==
Prior to this competition, the existing world, Asian and Games records were as follows.

World Record	Dennis Kimetto (KEN)	2:02:57	Berlin, Germany	28 September 2014
Asian Record	Yuta Shitara (JPN)	2:06:11	Tokyo, Japan	25 February 2018
Games Record	Takeyuki Nakayama (JPN)	2:08:21	Seoul, South Korea	5 October 1986

== Results ==
Legend

- DNF — Did not finish

Rank	Athlete	Time	Notes
1st place, gold medalist(s)	Hiroto Inoue (JPN)	2:18:22	
2nd place, silver medalist(s)	El-Hassan El-Abbassi (BRN)	2:18:22	
3rd place, bronze medalist(s)	Duo Bujie (CHN)	2:18:48	
4	Hayato Sonoda (JPN)	2:19:04	
5	Bat-Ochiryn Ser-Od (MGL)	2:23:42	
6	Ri Kang-bom (PRK)	2:23:42	
7	Dong Guojian (CHN)	2:23:55	
8	Tony Payne (THA)	2:24:52	
9	Andrey Petrov (UZB)	2:26:52	
10	Pak Chol (PRK)	2:29:07	
11	Ilya Tyapkin (KGZ)	2:32:06	
12	Kim Jae-hoon (KOR)	2:36:22	
13	Sanchai Namkhet (THA)	2:37:06	
14	Adilet Kyshtakbekov (KGZ)	2:51:57	
15	Shin Kwang-sik (KOR)	2:56:16	
—	Krishna Bahadur Basnet (NEP)	DNF	
—	Abdi Ibrahim Abdo (BRN)	DNF	
—	Mihail Krassilov (KAZ)	DNF	
—	Agus Prayogo (INA)	DNF	
—	Gopi Chandra Parki (NEP)	DNF	
—	Shifaz Mohamed (MDV)	DNF	
