= Athletics at the 2014 Asian Games – Men's marathon =

Men's marathon at the 2014 Asian Games
- Venue: Incheon Asiad Main Stadium
- Dates: 3 October 2014
- Competitors: 19 from 13 nations

Medalists
gold medal	Hasan Mahboob	Bahrain
silver medal	Kohei Matsumura	Japan
bronze medal	Yuki Kawauchi	Japan

The men's marathon event at the 2014 Asian Games was held on 3 October on the streets of Incheon, South Korea with the finish at the Incheon Asiad Main Stadium. Hasan Mahboob won the gold medal for Bahrain.

== Schedule ==
All times are Korea Standard Time (UTC+09:00)

Date	Time	Event
Friday, 3 October 2014	09:00	Final

== Records ==
Prior to this competition, the existing world, Asian and Games records were as follows.

World Record	Dennis Kimetto (KEN)	2:02:57	Berlin, Germany	28 September 2014
Asian Record	Toshinari Takaoka (JPN)	2:06:16	Chicago, United States	13 October 2002
Games Record	Takeyuki Nakayama (JPN)	2:08:21	Seoul, South Korea	5 October 1986

== Results ==
Legend

- DNF — Did not finish

Rank	Athlete	Time	Notes
1st place, gold medalist(s)	Hasan Mahboob (BRN)	2:12:38	
2nd place, silver medalist(s)	Kohei Matsumura (JPN)	2:12:39	
3rd place, bronze medalist(s)	Yuki Kawauchi (JPN)	2:12:42	
4	Bat-Ochiryn Ser-Od (MGL)	2:13:21	
5	Pak Chol (PRK)	2:14:34	
6	Anuradha Cooray (SRI)	2:15:51	
7	Ri Yong-ho (PRK)	2:20:06	
8	Su Guoxiong (CHN)	2:20:11	
9	Dambadarjaagiin Gantulga (MGL)	2:20:54	
10	Shim Jung-sub (KOR)	2:23:11	
11	Krishna Bahadur Basnet (NEP)	2:27:02	
12	Boonthung Srisung (THA)	2:28:41	
13	Noh Si-hwan (KOR)	2:31:29	
14	Kuniaki Takizaki (CAM)	2:34:16	
—	Nabil Al-Garbi (YEM)	DNF	
—	Hem Bunting (CAM)	DNF	
—	Aadam Ismaeel Khamis (BRN)	DNF	
—	Andrey Petrov (UZB)	DNF	
—	Thaung Aye (MYA)	DNF	
