= 2015 Asian Athletics Championships – Men's 10,000 metres =

The men's 10,000 metres at the 2015 Asian Athletics Championships was held on June 6.

== Medalists ==
| Gold | El Hassan El-Abbassi; Bahrain |
| Silver | Lakshmanan Govindan; India |
| Bronze | Andrey Petrov; Uzbekistan |

== Records ==
2015 Asian Athletics Championships
| World record | Kenenisa Bekele (ETH) | 26:17.53 | Brussels, Belgium | 26 August 2005 |
| Asian record | Abdullah Ahmad Hassan (QAT) | 26:38.76 | Brussels, Belgium | 5 September 2003 |
| Championship record | Hasan Mahboob (BHR) | 28:23.70 | Guangzhou, China | 14 November 2009 |

== Results ==
| Rank | Name | Nationality | Time | Notes |
|---|---|---|---|---|
| 1st place, gold medalist(s) | El Hassan El-Abbassi | Bahrain | 28:50.71 | |
| 2nd place, silver medalist(s) | Lakshmanan Govindan | India | 29:42.81 | |
| 3rd place, bronze medalist(s) | Andrey Petrov | Uzbekistan | 30:20.68 | |
| 4 | Qi Zhenfei | China | 31:07.17 | |
| 5 | Ilia Tiapkin | Kyrgyzstan | 31:14.67 | |
| 6 | Lal Bahadur Thapa | Nepal | 31:29.00 | |
| 7 | Shin Hyun-su | South Korea | 31:46.64 | |
| 8 | Kim Hak-su | South Korea | 33:01.29 | |
| | Alemu Gebre | Bahrain | DNS | |
| | Abdullah Al-Qwbani | Yemen | DNS | |
