= Thailand at the World Athletics Championships =

- Flag of Thailand
- WA code: THA
- Medals: Gold 0 Silver 0 Bronze 0 Total 0

World Athletics Championships appearances (overview)
- 1983; 1987; 1991; 1993; 1995; 1997; 1999; 2001; 2003; 2005; 2007; 2009; 2011; 2013; 2015; 2017; 2019; 2022; 2023; 2025

The Kingdom of Thailand has competed at every edition of the World Athletics Championships since 1983.

== Results ==
Key

- Note–Ranks given for track events are for the entire round
- Q = Qualified for the next round
- q = Qualified for the next round as a fastest loser or, in field events, by position without achieving the qualifying target
- NR = National record
- GR = Games record
- PB = Personal best
- SB = Season best
- DNF = Did not finish
- DNS = Did not start
- NM = No mark
- N/A = Round not applicable for the event
- Bye = Athlete not required to compete in round

=== 2009 ===
Thailand attended the 2009 World Championships in Athletics from 15–23 August. A team of 1 athlete was announced in preparation for the competition.

==== Team selection ====
Track and road events

Event	Athletes	
Event	Men	Women
4 x 100 metres relay	Unknown	
4 x 100 metres relay		Unknown

Field and combined events

Event	Athletes	
Event	Men	Women
High jump		Noengrothai Chaipetch

=== 2011 ===
A team of 8 athletes was organized to represent Thailand at the 2011 World Championships in Athletics from August 27 to September 4 in Daegu, South Korea. The team included Pichet Krungget, invited by the IPC for the 400m T53 (wheelchair) men exhibition event.

The following athlete appeared on the preliminary Entry List, but not on the Official Start List of the specific event, resulting in a total number of 6 competitors:

KEY:	Did not participate	Competed in another event

	Event	Athlete
Men	4 × 100 metres relay	Wachara Sondee

==== Men ====
Athlete	Event	Preliminaries		Heats		Semifinals		Final	
Athlete	Event	Time Width Height	Rank	Time Width Height	Rank	Time Width Height	Rank	Time Width Height	Rank
Weerawat Pharueang; Suppachai Chimdee; Sompote Suwannarangsri; Jirapong Meenapra	4 × 100 metres relay			39.54 SB	19			Did not advance	

==== Women ====
Athlete	Event	Preliminaries		Heats		Semifinals		Final	
Athlete	Event	Time Width Height	Rank	Time Width Height	Rank	Time Width Height	Rank	Time Width Height	Rank
Wanida Boonwan	High jump	1.85	22					Did not advance	

Heptathlon

Wassana Winatho	Heptathlon			
Wassana Winatho	Event	Results	Points	Rank
	100 m hurdles	13.62 PB	1033	18
	High jump	1.68	830	28
	Shot put	DNS	0	
	200 m			
	Long jump			
	Javelin throw			
	800 m			
Total			DNF	

=== 2013 ===
Thailand competed at the 2013 World Championships in Athletics in Moscow, Russia, from 10 to 18 August 2013. A team of two athletes was announced to represent the country in the event.

=== 2015 ===
Thailand competed at the 2015 World Championships in Athletics in Beijing, China, from 22–30 August 2015.

==== Men ====
Track and road events

Athlete	Event	Heat		Semifinal		Final	
Athlete	Event	Result	Rank	Result	Rank	Result	Rank
Jamras Rittidet	110 metres hurdles	14.00	6	Did not advance			

==== Women ====
Field events

Athlete	Event	Qualification		Final	
Athlete	Event	Distance	Position	Distance	Position
Subenrat Insaeng	Discus throw	55.14	29	Did not advance	

=== 2017 ===
Thailand] competed at the 2017 World Championships in Athletics in London, United Kingdom, from 4–13 August 2017.

==== Men ====
Combined events – Decathlon

Athlete	Event	100 m	LJ	SP	HJ	400 m	110H	DT	PV	JT	1500 m	Final	Rank
Sutthisak Singkhon	Result	11.16	7.65	13.34	DNS	DNS	–	–	–	–	–	DNF	–
Sutthisak Singkhon	Points	825	972	688	0	0						DNF	–

==== Women ====
Field events

Athlete	Event	Qualification		Final	
Athlete	Event	Distance	Position	Distance	Position
Subenrat Insaeng	Discus throw	55.16	26	Did not advance	

=== 2019 ===
Thailand took part in the 2019 World Athletics Championships in Doha, Qatar, from 27 September–6 October 2019. It had entered 1 athlete.

==== Men ====
Track and road events

Athlete	Event	Final	
Athlete	Event	Result	Rank
Tony Payne	Marathon	Did not finish	

=== 2022 ===
Thailand sent one athlete to compete at the 2022 World Athletics Championships in Eugene, Oregon, United States, from 15 to 24 July 2022.

==== Men ====
Track and road events

Athlete	Event	Heats		Final	
Athlete	Event	Result	Rank	Result	Rank
Kieran Tuntivate	5000 metres	14:29.28	40	Did not advance	

=== 2023 ===
Thailand competed at the 2023 World Athletics Championships in Budapest, Hungary, from 19 to 27 August 2023. entering 1 athlete.

==== Women ====
Field events

Athlete	Event	Qualification		Final	
Athlete	Event	Distance	Position	Distance	Position
Subenrat Insaeng	Discus throw	56.19	28	Did not advance	

=== 2025 ===
Thailand took part in the 2025 World Athletics Championships in Tokyo, Japan, from 13 to 21 September 2025. entering 2 athletes to the competition: 1 man and 1 woman.

==== Men ====
Track and road events

Athlete	Event	Heat		Semifinal		Final	
Athlete	Event	Result	Rank	Result	Rank	Result	Rank
Puripol Boonson	100 metres	10.15	4 q	10.17	7	Did not advance	

==== Women ====
Field events

Athlete	Event	Qualification		Final	
Athlete	Event	Distance	Position	Distance	Position
Subenrat Insaeng	Discus throw	58.01	27	Did not advance	
