= 2017 Asian Athletics Championships – Men's 5000 metres =

The men's 5000 metres at the 2017 Asian Athletics Championships was held on 6 July.

== Results ==
Rank	Name	Nationality	Time	Notes
1st place, gold medalist(s)	Govindan Lakshmanan	India	14:54.48	
2nd place, silver medalist(s)	Yaser Salem Bagharab	Qatar	14:55.89	
3rd place, bronze medalist(s)	Tariq Ahmed Al-Amri	Saudi Arabia	14:56.83	
4	Liu Hongliang	China	14:57.95	
5	Duo Bujie	China	15:00.86	
6	Murli Kumar Gavit	India	15:02.43	
7	Adilet Kyshtakbekov	Kyrgyzstan	15:09.59	
8	Gantulga Dambadarjaa	Mongolia	15:20.38	
9	Gopi Chandra	Nepal	15:52.75	
10	Hussain Haroon	Maldives	15:53.15	
11	Khalid Al-Badwawi	United Arab Emirates	15:58.05	
12	Enkhtamir Ganbagana	Mongolia	16:01.55	
13	Ma Viro	Cambodia	16:33.41	
14	Zaid Shareef	Maldives	16:40.83	
	Mahmoud Esbitan	Palestine	DNS	

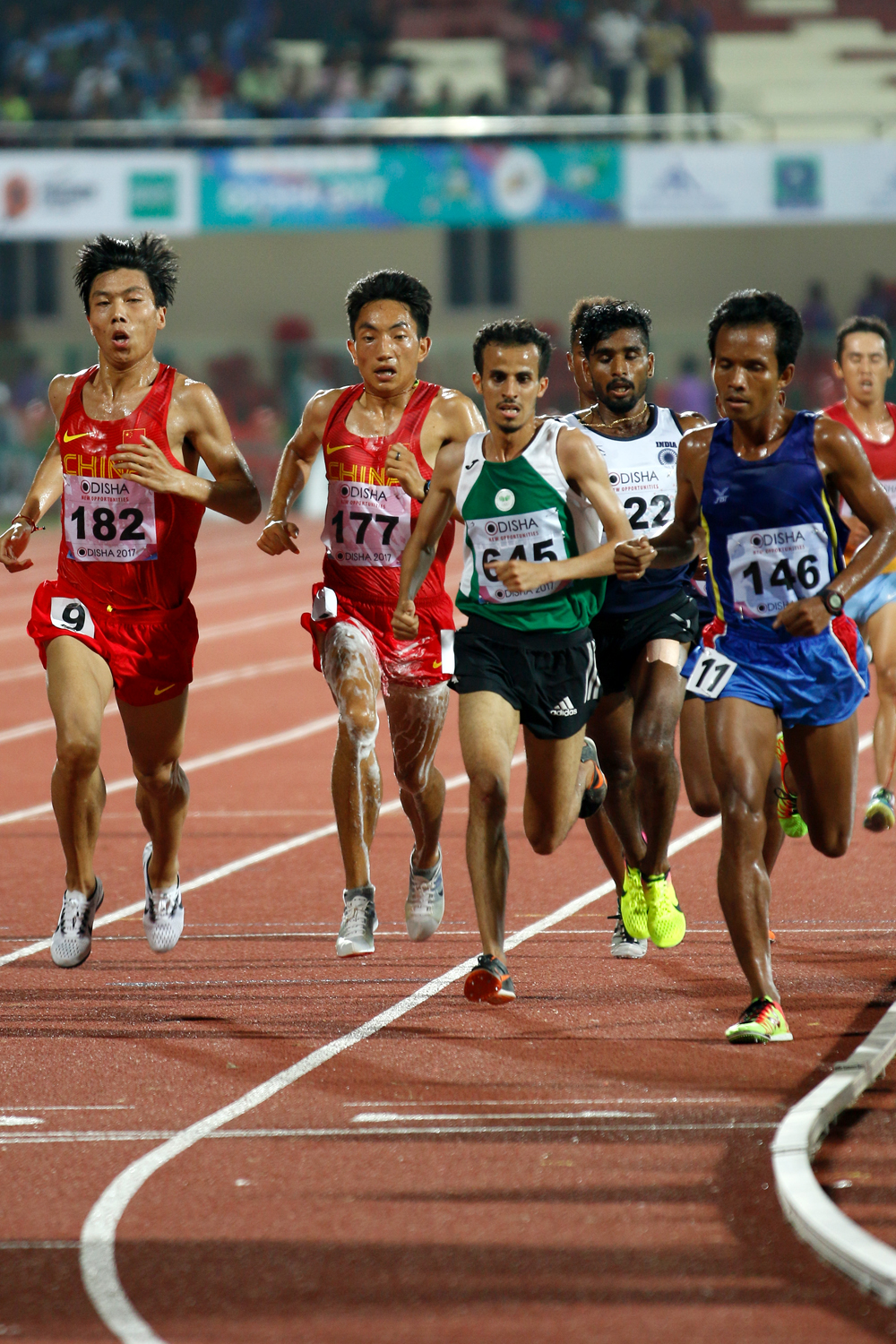
The race underway
