= Tony Payne =

Tony Payne may refer to:

- Tony Payne (darts) (born 1955), American darts player
- Tony Payne (athlete) (born 1989), Thai long distance runner
