= 2017 Asian Athletics Championships – Men's 10,000 metres =

The men's 10,000 metres at the 2017 Asian Athletics Championships was held on 9 July.

== Results ==
Rank	Name	Nationality	Time	Notes
1st place, gold medalist(s)	Govindan Lakshmanan	India	29:55.87	
2nd place, silver medalist(s)	Gopi Thonakal	India	29:58.89	
3rd place, bronze medalist(s)	Adilet Kyshtakbekov	Kyrgyzstan	30:06.65	
4	Wang Danmuzhenci	China	30:39.68	
5	Qi Zhenfei	China	31:00.32	
6	Mohammed Rageh	Yemen	32:08.71	
7	Gantulga Dambadarjaa	Mongolia	32:11.06	
8	Kalidas Hirave	India	32:29.87	
9	Hussain Haroon	Maldives	34:21.60	
10	Ma Viro	Cambodia	34:56.97	
11	Zaid Shareef	Maldives	35:15.64	
12	Mohammad Karim Yaqoot	Afghanistan	35:45.46	
	Gopi Chandra	Nepal	DNF	
