= Shadrack Kiptoo Biwott =

American long-distance runner

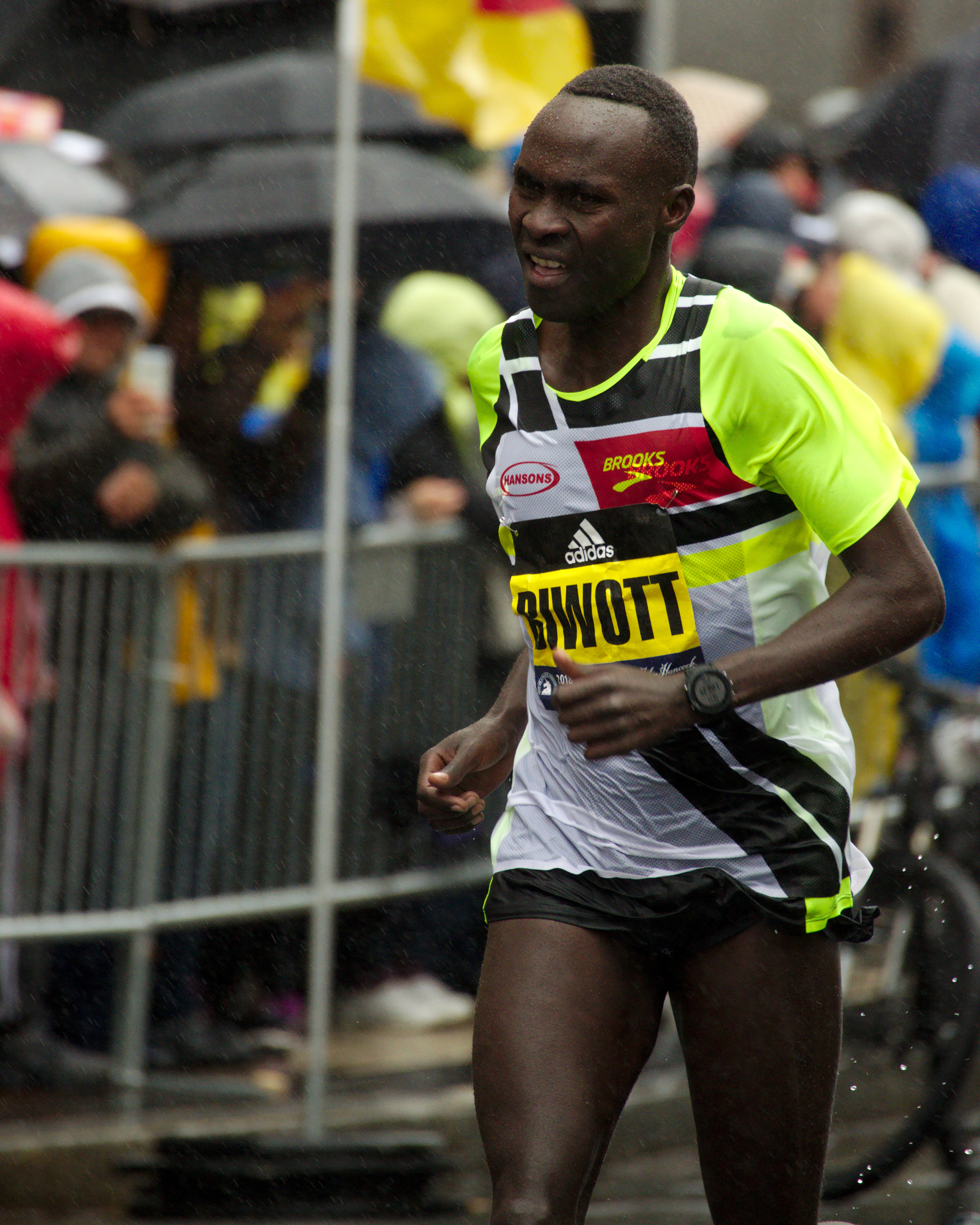
- Biwott at the 2018 Boston Marathon

Personal information
- Nationality: American
- Born: February 15, 1985 (age 41) Eldoret, Kenya
- Height: 5 ft 9 in (175 cm)
- Weight: 125 lb (57 kg)

Sport
- Sport: Track; Road Racing
- Event: Marathon
- College team: Oregon Ducks
- Club: Hanson Brooks Running
- Turned pro: 2009

Achievements and titles
- Personal bests: 3000 m: 7:55.27(i) (New York 2009); 5000 m: 13:36.25 (Eugene 2009); 10,000 m: 28:28.83 (Palo Alto 2009); Half marathon: 61:25 (San Diego 2014); Marathon: 2:12:01 (New York 2016)
Medal record
World Marathon Majors
Bronze medal – third place	2018 Boston	Marathon

Shadrack Kiptoo Biwott (born February 15, 1985, in Kenya) is a Kenyan-born American long-distance runner.

== Early life ==
Biwott grew up in Eldoret in the Rift Valley Province of Kenya and moved to the United States in 2002 to attend La Cueva High School in Albuquerque, New Mexico. On November 8, 2003, he placed first in the state with a time of 15:23.00 at the New Mexico State Cross Country Championships.

== College career ==
Biwott graduated from the University of Oregon where he was an multiple time All-American.

Biwott was an athlete of the Year for cross country lead the Oregon Ducks to an impressive group of five Men of Oregon All-Americans returning for the defending NCAA Division I national team champion in 2008.

Biwott earned 2007 cross country honors and was named the Pac-10 Athlete of the Year for winning his first Pac-10 xc title.

Biwott debut at 2007 Stanford Cardinal track and field Invitational earning an NCAA provisional mark in 10,000 meters in 29:00.52.

Representing University of Oregon
School Year	Pac-12 Conference Cross Country	NCAA Division I Cross Country	MPSF Indoor track and field	NCAA Division I Indoor track and field	Pac-12 Conference Outdoor Track and Field	NCAA Division I Outdoor Track and Field
2008-09 Senior	5th, 23:42.5	9th, 29:43.4		3000 m 11th, 8:06.12; 5000 m 10th, 14:07.81	5,000 m 2nd, 13:52.79; 10,000 m 2nd 29:03.47	5000 m 8th, 14:11.45
2007-08 Junior	1st, 22:55	9th, 29:55.9			5000 m 14th, 14:35.93	
2006-07 Sophomore	6th, 23:28.89	98th, 32:37.0			5000 m 7th, 14:17.02; 10,000 m 3rd, 29:11.66	10,000 m 9th, 29:13.43
Representing University of New Mexico
School Year	Mountain West Conference Cross Country	NCAA Division I Cross Country	Mountain West Conference Indoor track and field	NCAA Division I Indoor track and field	Mountain West Conference Outdoor Track and Field	NCAA Division I Outdoor Track and Field
2004-05 Freshman	1st, 24:44.0	14th, 31:16.9			800 m 3rd, 1:51.41	
2004-05 Freshman	1st, 24:44.0	14th, 31:16.9	Mile 6th 4:19.38		1500 m 2nd, 3:53.66	

== Professional career ==
After graduating from Oregon, Biwott signed to train on the track under coach Mark Rowland led Oregon Track Club until 2012.

Biwott became a U.S. citizen and moved to Folsom, California in 2012.

Biwott was the USATF Running Circuit champion in 2013, finishing on the podium (top 3) in his five races in the Circuit: 2nd at the USA Half Marathon Championships, 3rd at the USA 10K Championships, 2nd at the USA 20K Championships, 3rd at the USA Marathon Championships and 2nd at the US National Road Racing Championships

Biwott placed 3rd in 2013 Medtronic Twin Cities Marathon in Minnesota in 2:13:26.

Biwott was sponsored by ASICS in 2014.

Biwott competed at the 2014 IAAF World Half Marathon Championships where he finished 39th.

Biwott placed 14th in 2:12:55 at 2014 BMW Frankfurt Marathon.

Biwott placed 7th at the Los Angeles U.S. Olympic Trials Marathon in 2:15:23.

He finished 5th at the 2016 New York City Marathon.

At the 2017 Boston Marathon he placed 4th.

Biwott joined the Hanson Brooks Project on April 27, 2017.

At the 2018 Boston Marathon he placed 3rd.

At the 2019 Boston Marathon he placed 15th.

=== Anti-Doping Rule Violation ===
On January 5, 2024, Biwott tested positive for erythropoietin (EPO). An evidentiary hearing on May 7, 2025 resulted in a four-year sanction. The United States Anti-Doping Agency (USADA) and Biwott presented their cases at this hearing, and an independent arbitrator passed the ruling. Biwott's suspension was set to last until February 23, 2028, four years after his provisional suspension.
