= Thonakal Gopi =

Indian athlete

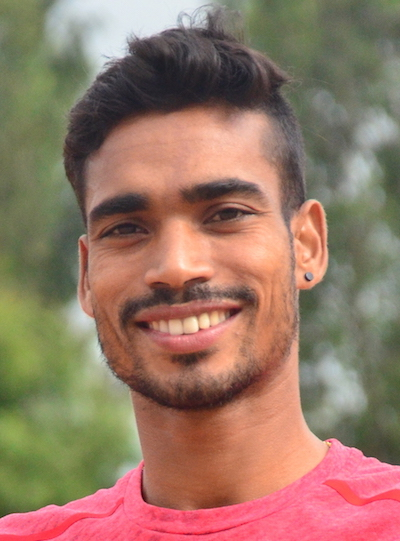
- Gopi in 2016

Personal information
- Nationality: Indian
- Born: 24 May 1988 (age 38) Wayanad, Kerala, India

Sport
- Country: India
- Sport: Track and field
- Events: 10,000 metres Marathon

Achievements and titles
- World finals: Asian Marathon Championship Gold Medal 2017
- Personal best: Marathon: 2:12:23 (Valencia 2025)
Medal record
Men's athletics
Representing India
Asian Championships
Silver medal – second place	2017 Bhubaneswar	10,000 m
South Asian Games
Gold medal – first place	2016 Guwahati/Shillong	10000m

Thonakal Gopi (born 24 May 1988), also known as Thanackal Gopi, is an Indian athlete who has qualified to represent India at the 2016 Summer Olympics in the marathon event. He is also in the Indian Army. He is the first and so far the only Indian athlete to win a gold medal in the Asian Marathon Championship.

== Career ==
At age 21, he joined as a general recruit, starting as a Hawildar at the Army Artillery Center in Hyderabad and completed the 9 month mandatory Army training.

Typically a 10,000m athlete, he was designated to keep Nitendra Rawat on track for the first 30 km so that Rawat may qualify for the Olympics with a timing of 02:15 at the 2016 Mumbai marathon. However, Gopi found the distance comfortable and kept going to complete as the 2nd Indian (11th overall, right behind Rawat). He says he never felt the anticipated fatigue of the last 5 km, even though he was bracing his body for it. His VO2 Max is around 84 (ml of Oxygen used in 1 min per kg of bodyweight, comparable to Lance Armstrong), with a resting heart rate of around 45bpm.

In addition to winning the 2014 Gold Medal in the 10,000 meter National Open Athletics and the 2016 Gold Medal in the South Asian Games with a new Games Record, Gopi represented India in the 2016 Asian Cross Country Championships. He represented India at the 2016 Summer Olympics, qualifying with a Marathon time of 02:16:15 in the 2016 Mumbai Marathon along with two other Indian marathoner men, Kheta Ram and Nitendra Singh Rawat.

== Competition Record ==
Year	Competition	Venue	Position	Event	Time	Reference
2014	National Open Athletics Championships	New Delhi, India	1st	10,000 meters	29:32:26	
2015	Airtel Delhi Half Marathon	New Delhi, India	2nd Indian / 19th Overall	Half marathon	1:02:45	
2016	Mumbai Marathon	Mumbai, India	2nd Indian / 11th Overall	Marathon	2:16:15	
2016	South Asian Games	Guwahati, India	1st	10,000 meters	29:10:53 GR	
2016	Summer Olympics	Rio de Janeiro, Brazil	1st Indian / 25th Overall	Marathon	2:15:25	
2017	IAAF World Championships	London, UK	1st Indian / 28th Overall	Marathon	2:17:13	

== Personal life ==
Born in Wayanad district of the state of Kerala. The son of Wayanad farmers, Gopi is an only child who helped his parents grow rice and ginger while he grew up on their small area of land. Gopi went to Kakkavayal Govt. Higher Secondary School and used to consistently participate in school and college meets. He began a bachelor's degree in economics at Mar Athanasius College in Kothamangalam, Kerala, but dropped out in the third year when he passed the Army fitness test and joined the Indian Army at Age 21. His home state of Kerala still produces the maximum number of track athletes in India.

He is the only earning member of his family and sends his savings home, except for a monthly purchase shoes (priced at roughly Rs 10,000 per pair) to accommodate the number of miles that the athlete runs each month. As of mid 2016, he does not have any corporate sponsorship and has to purchase his own shoes. He and his fellow athletes spend 11 out of 12 months of the year away from home and without meeting their families, a sacrifice that they must make in order to compete on the world stage.
