= Ratiram Saini =

Indian long-distance runner

Personal information
- Born: 15 February 1986 (age 40) Dera, Rajasthan, India
- Employer: Indian Railways

Sport
- Country: India
- Sport: Athletics
- Event(s): Long-distance running, Cross country
- Coached by: Sabal Pratap Singh
Medal record
Men's athletics
Representing India
Asian Athletics Championships
Bronze medal – third place	2013 Pune	10,000 m
USIC World Railway Championships
Gold medal – first place	2008 Czech Republic	Cross country
Gold medal – first place	2016 Denmark	Cross country

Ratiram Saini (born 15 February 1986) is an Indian long-distance athlete who specializes in the 5,000-metre and 10,000-metre events. He is best known for winning the bronze medal in the 10,000-metre final at the 2013 Asian Athletics Championships held in Pune, India.

Saini works as an electrical technician for Northern Railway in Lucknow.

== Early life ==
Rati Ram Saini grew up in the village of Dera, located near the Sariska Tiger Reserve in Rajasthan. During his youth, he regularly ran in hilly terrain while taking his family's buffaloes for grazing.

== Career ==
Rati Ram Saini began competing in cross-country running during his school years in Alwar, Rajasthan. He started formal training under coach Sabal Pratap Singh in 2004. In 2006, he joined Indian Railways on a sports quota, which allowed him to continue training while employed.

Saini won an international gold medal at the Union Sportive Internationale des Cheminots (USIC) Cross Country Railway Championship in the Czech Republic in 2008. He later won a bronze medal at the Asian Cross Country Championship in Pune in 2013.

He won gold medals at the USIC Cross Country Championships in Denmark (2016) and Berlin, and also won a gold medal at the South Asian Cross Country Championship in Bhutan. By 2022, he had won five international medals in cross-country events, including four gold medals.

== See also ==
- List of people from Rajasthan
