= Hiroto Inoue =

Japanese long-distance runner

Personal information
- Native name: 井上 大仁
- Nationality: Japanese
- Born: January 6, 1993 (age 33) Isahaya, Nagasaki, Japan
- Height: 1.65 m (5 ft 5 in)
- Weight: 51 kg (112 lb)

Sport
- Event(s): Half marathon, marathon
Medal record
Men's athletics
Representing Japan
Asian Games
Gold medal – first place	2018 Jakarta-Palembang	Marathon

Hiroto Inoue (井上 大仁, Inoue Hiroto; born January 6, 1993) is a Japanese track and field athlete from Nagasaki Prefecture who specializes in long-distance running. He graduated from Yamanashi Gakuin University. He is a member of the Mitsubishi Hitachi Power Systems team in Nagasaki.

== Personal history ==
Inoue finished in eighth place in the 2017 Tokyo Marathon, the highest result among Japanese runners. He finished 5th, with his personal best, in the 2018 Tokyo Marathon.
