= Kumanichi Road Race =

Japanese footrace

- Date: February
- Location: Kumamoto, Japan
- Event type: Road
- Distance: 30 kilometres
- Established: 1957
- Website: Kumamoto 30K

The Kumanichi Road Race (Japanese: 熊本30K) is an annual road running competition over 30 kilometres which is typically held in February in Kumamoto, Japan. It was first held in 1957 as a men-only competition. A women's race was introduced in 2006. The race is one of the world's most prominent over the uncommon 30K distance. A total of eight Association of Road Racing Statisticians-recognised men's world records have been set at the competition, including the current world record.

The course records are held by Takayuki Matsumiya (1:28:00) and Yuka Hakoyama (1:43:26). It is mostly contested by Japanese athletes, with Kenya's Willy Kangogo becoming the event's sole non-national winner in 2007.

== Past winners ==
Key: Course record

Edition	Year	Men's winner	Time (h:m:s)	Women's winner	Time (h:m:s)
1st	1957	Kaneyuki (JPN)	1:40:20	Not held	
2nd	1958	Kenji Fujimoto (JPN)	1:42:25	Not held	
3rd	1959	Toru Takaguchi (JPN)	1:38:40	Not held	
4th	1960	Yoshinori Yamamoto (JPN)	1:44:02	Not held	
5th	1961	Morio Shigematsu (JPN)	1:36:29	Not held	
6th	1962	Rikio Maeda (JPN)	1:40:09	Not held	
7th	1963	Teruhisa Momii (JPN)	1:35:05.4	Not held	
8th	1964	Kazumi Watanabe (JPN)	1:33:52.8	Not held	
9th	1965	Toru Terasawa (JPN)	1:31:51.6	Not held	
10th	1966	Yutaka Aoki (JPN)	1:36:08.0	Not held	
11th	1967	Hirokazu Okabe (JPN)	1:32:51.6	Not held	
12th	1968	Morio Shigematsu (JPN)	1:32:49.2	Not held	
13th	1969	Kenji Kimihara (JPN)	1:33:02.6	Not held	
14th	1970	Misao Yoneshige (JPN)	1:34:36	Not held	
15th	1971	Akio Usami (JPN)	1:31:26.8	Not held	
16th	1972	Misao Yoneshige (JPN)	1:33:55	Not held	
17th	1973	Kenichi Otsuki (JPN)	1:33:18	Not held	
18th	1974	Makoto Hattori (JPN)	1:32:48.8	Not held	
19th	1975	Kunimitsu Itō (JPN)	1:31:22.0	Not held	
20th	1976	Toshiaki Kamata (JPN)	1:30:20.8	Not held	
21st	1977	Kunimitsu Itō (JPN)	1:31:11.2	Not held	
22nd	1978	Hiroshi Yuge (JPN)	1:31:45.9	Not held	
23rd	1979	Hiroshi Yuge (JPN)	1:32:45.8	Not held	
24th	1980	Kunimitsu Itō (JPN)	1:29:12	Not held	
25th	1981	Kazuyoshi Kudo (JPN)	1:31:00	Not held	
26th	1982	Tetsuo Urakawa (JPN)	1:31:52	Not held	
27th	1983	Mitsuaki Mimura (JPN)	1:32:51	Not held	
28th	1984	Toshihiro Shibutani (JPN)	1:33:09	Not held	
29th	1985	Kazuya Nishimoto (JPN)	1:28:46	Not held	
30th	1986	Chiaki Harumatsu (JPN)	1:31:20	Not held	
31st	1987	Shuichi Yoneshige (JPN)	1:29:51	Not held	
32nd	1988	Shuichi Morita (JPN)	1:31:45	Not held	
33rd	1989	Kazuyoshi Kudo (JPN)	1:29:46	Not held	
34th	1990	Kōichi Morishita (JPN)	1:30:47	Not held	
35th	1991	Katsumi Ikeda (JPN)	1:30:17	Not held	
36th	1992	Yosuke Osawa (JPN)	1:30:25	Not held	
37th	1993	Shinichi Akiyoshi (JPN)	1:30:37	Not held	
38th	1994	Takayuki Inubushi (JPN)	1:30:29	Not held	
39th	1995	Sakae Osaki (JPN)	1:30:01	Not held	
40th	1996	Kenichi Takahashi (JPN)	1:29:46	Not held	
41st	1997	Tadayuki Ojima (JPN)	1:30:26	Not held	
42nd	1998	Yasuyuki Watanabe (JPN)	1:29:47	Not held	
43rd	1999	Kenji Noguchi (JPN)	1:29:46	Not held	
44th	2000	Kenichi Takahashi (JPN)	1:29:55	Not held	
45th	2001	Toshinari Takaoka (JPN)	1:29:23	Not held	
46th	2002	Ryoji Matsushita (JPN)	1:30:04	Not held	
47th	2003	Takayuki Matsumiya (JPN)	1:28:36	Not held	
48th	2004	Tomohiro Seto (JPN)	1:29:50	Not held	
49th	2005	Takayuki Matsumiya (JPN)	1:28:00	Not held	
50th	2006	Tomoya Shimizu (JPN)	1:31:09	Miho Notagashira (JPN)	1:44:13
51st	2007	Willy Kangogo (KEN)	1:29:59	Mika Okunaga (JPN)	1:45:46
52nd	2008	Masaki Shimoju (JPN)	1:30:33	Miho Notagashira (JPN)	1:44:00
53rd	2009	Yu Mitsuya (JPN)	1:29:55	Chiharu Matsuo (JPN)	1:48:22
54th	2010	Atsushi Fujita (JPN)	1:29:46	Chiharu Matsuo (JPN)	1:50:18
55th	2011	Tomoyuki Morita (JPN)	1:32:14	Not held	
56th	2012	Tsuyoshi Ugachi (JPN)	1:30:01	Yuka Hakoyama (JPN)	1:43:26
57th	2013	Yuki Kawauchi (JPN)	1:29:31	Yuko Mizuguchi (JPN)	1:43:46
58th	2014	Yuma Hattori (JPN)	1:28:52	Yuka Takashima (JPN)	1:44:19
59th	2015	Shin Kimura (JPN)	1:31:27	Saori Noda (JPN)	1:45:00
60th	2016	Keita Shitara (JPN)	1:30:45	Sakiko Matsumi (JPN)	1:45:59
61st	2017	Yuichiro Ueno (JPN)	1:30:17	Sakie Arai (JPN)	1:46:29
62nd	2018	Keisuke Hayashi (JPN)	1:29:47	Yuko Watanabe (JPN)	1:47:17
63rd	2019	Kei Katanishi (JPN)	1:29:34	Nanayo Okamoto (JPN)	1:45:48
