= Duo Bujie =

Chinese long-distance runner

Duo Bujie སྟོབས་རྒྱལ།
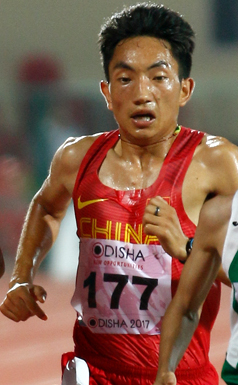
- Duo Bujie in 2017

Personal information
- Born: 16 February 1994 (age 32) Taktse, Tibet Autonomous Region, China
- Height: 175 cm (5 ft 9 in)

Sport
- Sport: Track and field
- Event: 5000 metres
- Updated on 29 August 2015

Duo Bujie (Chinese: 多布杰; Tibetan: སྟོབས་རྒྱལ།; born 16 February 1994) is a Chinese long-distance runner of Tibetan ethnicity, competing primarily in the 5000 metres. He is from Taktse, Lhasa. He represented his country at the 2015 World Championships in Beijing without reaching the final. In 2019, he competed in the men's marathon at the 2019 World Athletics Championships held in Doha, Qatar. He did not finish his race.

== International competitions ==
Year	Competition	Venue	Position	Event	Notes
Representing China
2014	Asian Games	Incheon, South Korea	12th	5000 m	14:13.74
2015	Asian Championships	Wuhan, China	5th	5000 m	13:55.58
2015	World Championships	Beijing, China	34th (h)	5000 m	14:07.35
2017	Asian Championships	Bhubaneswar, India	5th	5000 m	15:00.86
2018	Asian Games	Jakarta, Indonesia	3rd	Marathon	2:18:48
2019	Universiade	Naples, Italy	–	Half marathon	DQ
2019	World Championships	Doha, Qatar	–	Marathon	DNF

== Personal bests ==
Outdoor

- 5000 metres – 13:49.16 (Xi'an 2021)
- 10,000 metres – 28:26.86 (Tianjin 2017)
- Marathon – 2:10:31 (Xuzhou 2019)
