= Shin Kwang-sik =

South Korean long-distance runner

Personal information
- Born: 16 February 1993 (age 32)

Sport
- Country: South Korea
- Sport: Athletics
- Event: Long-distance running

Shin Kwang-sik (born 16 February 1993) is a South Korean long-distance runner. In 2017, he competed in the men's marathon event at the 2017 World Championships in Athletics held in London, United Kingdom. In 2018, he competed in the men's marathon at the 2018 Asian Games held in Jakarta, Indonesia.
