= 2018 Boston Marathon =

Footrace in Boston, Massachusetts, USA

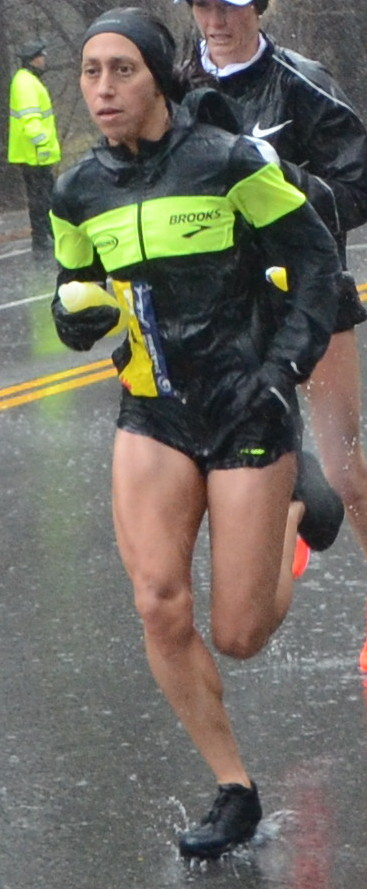
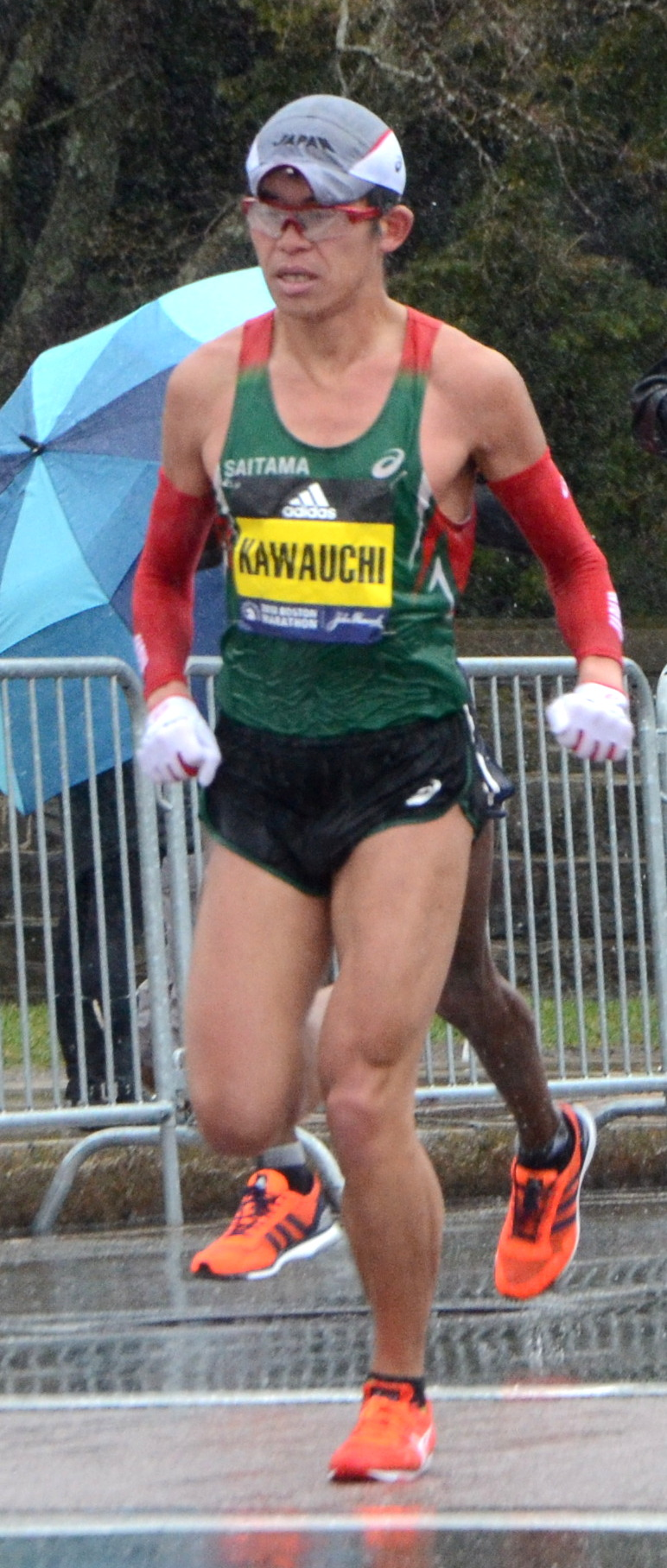
- Desiree Linden and Yuki Kawauchi
- Venue: Boston, Massachusetts, United States
- Dates: April 16, 2018

Champions
- Men: Yuki Kawauchi (2:15:58)
- Women: Desiree Linden (2:39:54)
- Wheelchair men: Marcel Hug (1:46:26)
- Wheelchair women: Tatyana McFadden (2:04:39)

The 2018 Boston Marathon was the 122nd running of the Boston Athletic Association's Boston Marathon. It took place on Monday, April 16, 2018 (Patriots' Day in Massachusetts). The race was held in unusually cold weather at 39 °F (4 °C) with rain. Yuki Kawauchi won the men's foot race in 2:15:58 and Desiree Linden won the women's foot race in 2:39:54. The previous year's times were 2:09:37 and 2:21:52, respectively, reflecting the difficult running conditions this year. Wheelchair winners were Marcel Hug, 1:46:26, and Tatyana McFadden, 2:04:39.

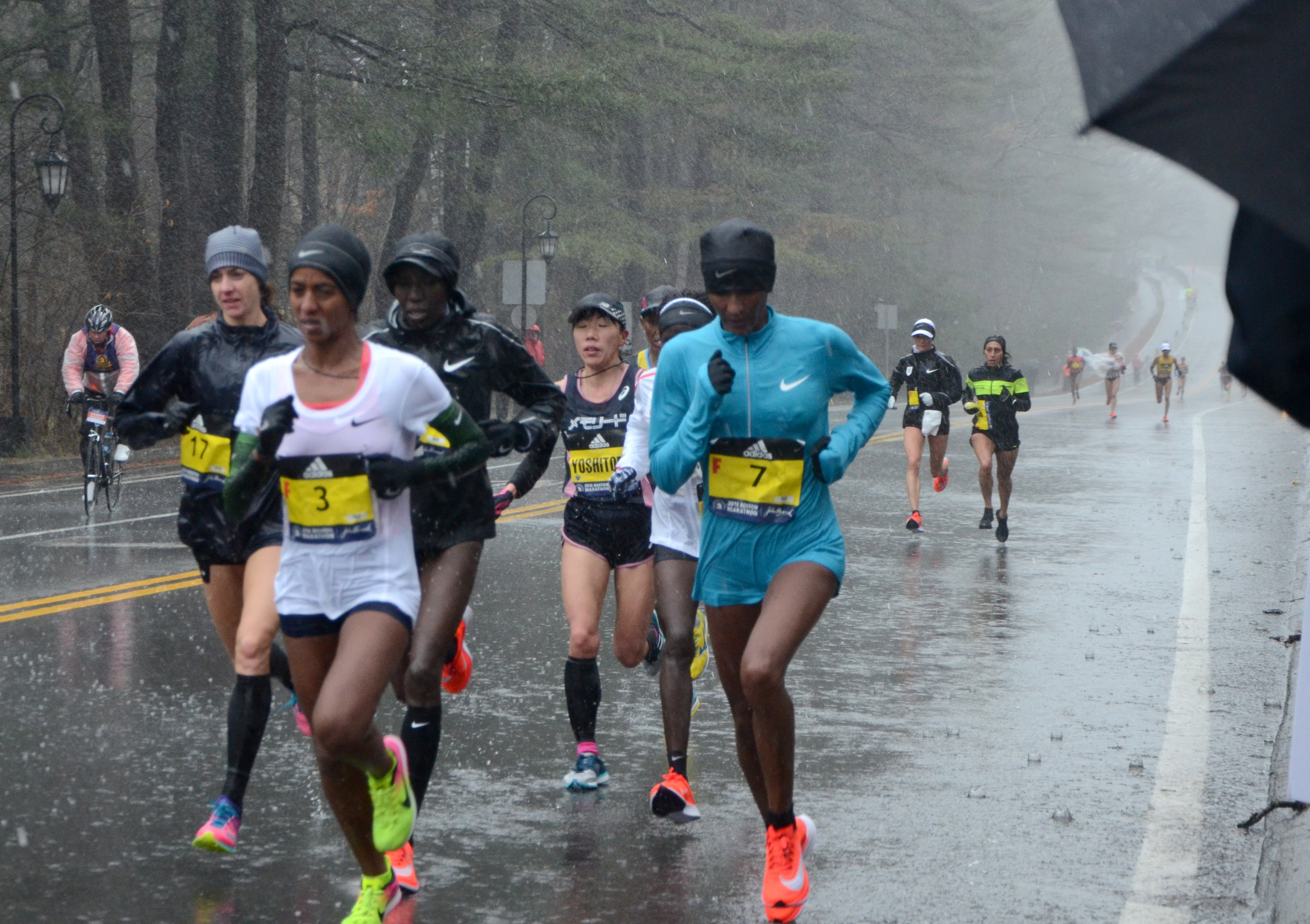
Lead women near halfway point of Boston Marathon 2018 during an especially hard down pour. The woman's winner, Desiree Linden, wearing black with a large green stripe, is on the right of the pair of runners behind the lead pack.

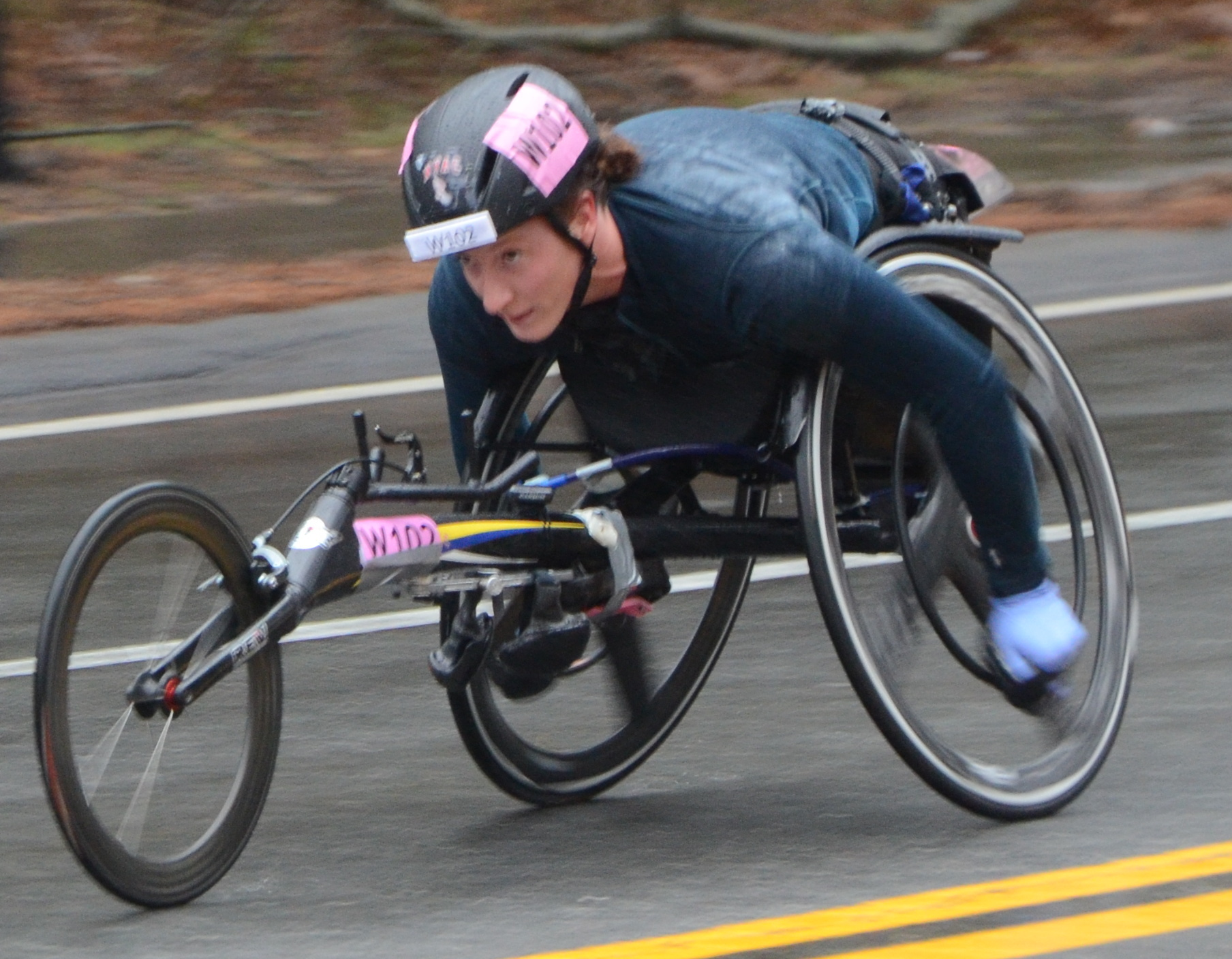
Tatyana McFadden

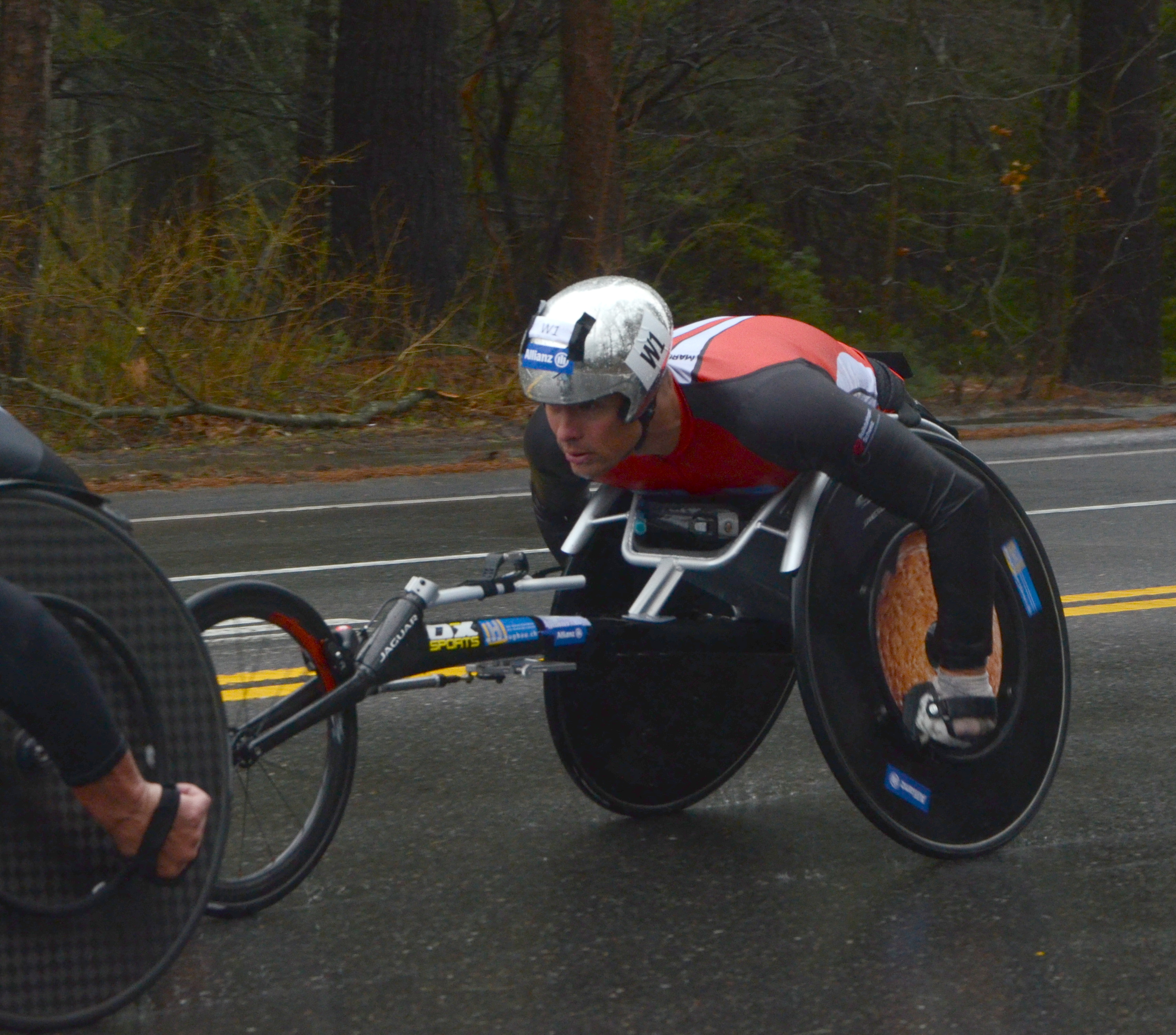
Marcel Hug

== Course ==
The event ran along the same winding course the Marathon has followed for many decades: 26 miles, 385 yards (42.195 km) of roads and city streets, starting in Hopkinton and passing through six Massachusetts cities and towns, to the finish line beside the Boston Public Library, on Boylston Street in Boston's Copley Square. There was rain and hail throughout the day, heavy at times, with temperatures in the 40s F and gusty winds.

== Results ==
Results reported by the Boston Globe, and the BAA.

Elite Men
Place	Athlete	Nationality	Time
1	Yuki Kawauchi	Japan	2:15:58
2	Geoffrey Kirui	Kenya	2:18:23
3	Shadrack Biwott	United States	2:18:35

Elite Women
Place	Athlete	Nationality	Time
1	Desiree Linden	United States	2:39:54
2	Sarah Sellers	United States	2:44:04
3	Krista DuChene	Canada	2:44:20

=== Wheelchair ===
Men
Place	Athlete	Nationality	Time
1	Marcel Hug	Switzerland	1:46:26
2	Ernst van Dyk	South Africa	1:47:14
3	Daniel Romanchuk	United States	1:50:39

Women
Place	Athlete	Nationality	Time
1	Tatyana McFadden	United States	2:04:39
2	Susannah Scaroni	United States	2:20:01
3	Sandra Graf	Switzerland	2:26:32
