= Adilet Kyshtakbekov =

Kyrgyzstani athletics competitor

Personal information
- Born: 11 April 1993 (age 33) Talas District, Kyrgyzstan
- Education: Kyrgyz Technical University
- Height: 165 cm (5 ft 5 in)
- Weight: 52 kg (115 lb)

Sport
- Sport: Athletics
- Event: 800 m – marathon
- Coached by: Viktor Borisov (personal)

Achievements and titles
- Personal bests: 800 m – 1:55.1 (2015); 1500 m – 3:54.30 (2014); 5000 m – 15:03.11 (2015); 10,000 m – 30:06.65 (2017); HM – 1:06:24 (2017); Mar – 2:51:57 (2018)
Medal record
Representing Kyrgyzstan
Asian Athletics Championships
Bronze medal – third place	2017 Bhubaneswar	10,000 m

Adilet Kyshtakbekov (also Kyshtabekov, born 11 April 1993) is a runner from Kyrgyzstan who competed internationally over distances from 800 m to marathon. He won a bronze medal in the 10,000 m at the 2017 Asian Championships and placed 10th in the 1500 m at the 2014 Asian Games and 14th in the marathon at the 2018 Asian Games.

Kyshtakbekov took up athletics in 2005 following his father.
