= Bat-Ochir Ser-Od =

Mongolian long-distance runner

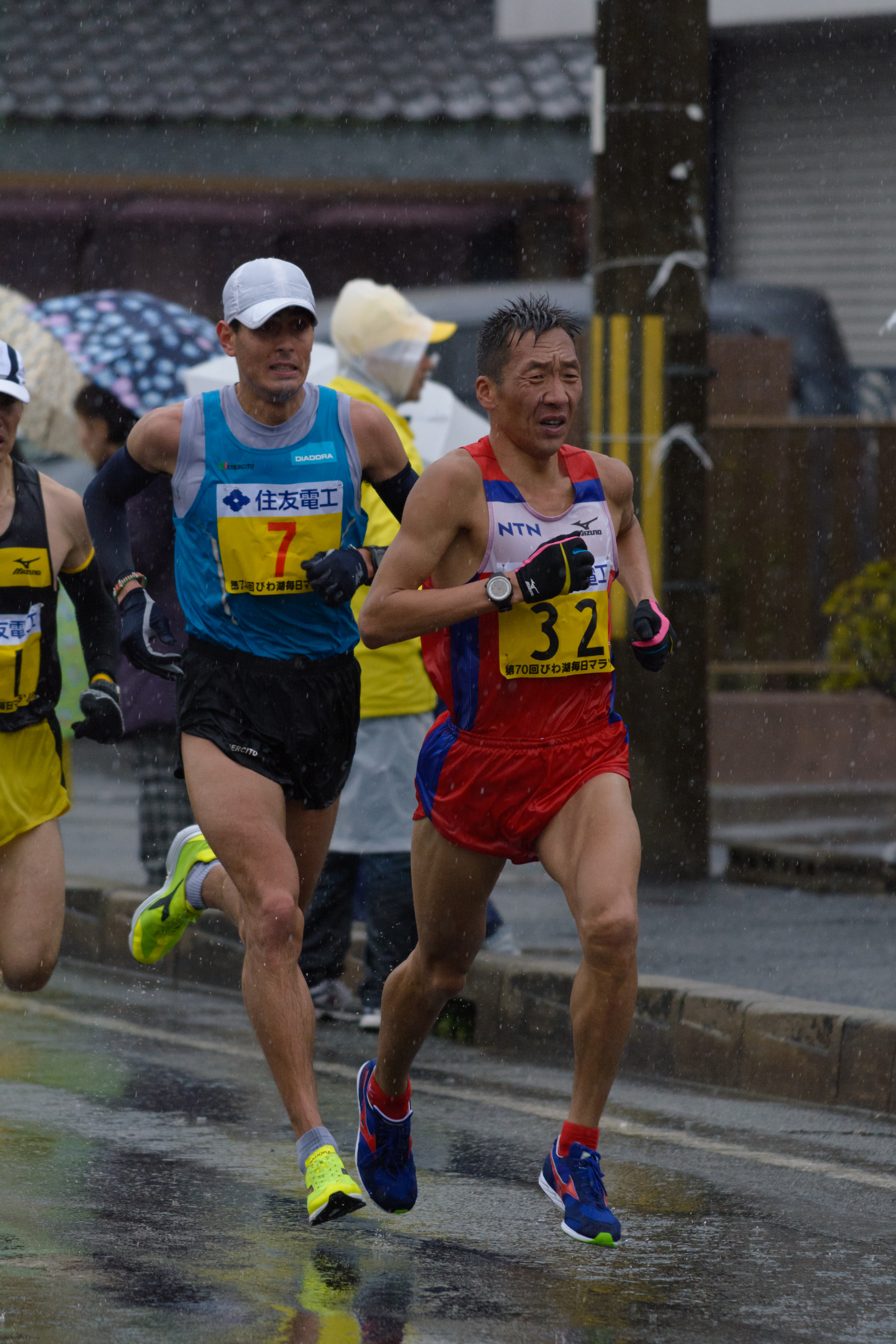
- Bat-Ochir Ser-Od (#32) at the 2015 Lake Biwa Marathon

Personal information
- Native name: Бат-Очир Сэр-Од
- Nationality: Mongolian
- Born: 7 October 1981 (age 44) Govi-Altai Province, Mongolia
- Height: 1.70 m (5 ft 7 in)
- Weight: 60 kg (132 lb)

Sport
- Country: Mongolia
- Sport: Athletics
- Event: Marathon

Achievements and titles
- Regional finals: 4th (2014)
Medal record
Men's Marathon
Representing Mongolia
Asian Championships
Gold medal – first place	2013 Hong Kong	Marathon
Silver medal – second place	2008 Hong Kong	Marathon
East Asian Games
Silver medal – second place	2013 Tianjin	5000 m
Osaka Marathon
Gold medal – first place	2013 Osaka	Marathon
Beppu-Oita Marathon
Silver medal – second place	2013 Beppu–Oita	Marathon
Lake Biwa Marathon
Bronze medal – third place	2015 Otsu	Marathon
Fukuoka Marathon
Bronze medal – third place	2014 Fukuoka	Marathon

Bat-Ochir "Ziggy" Ser-Od (Mongolian: Бат-Очирын Сэр-Од, born 7 October 1981) is a Mongolian long-distance runner, particularly the marathon. He represented his country in the marathon at six Summer Olympics, the most of any marathoner ever, in 2004, 2008, 2012, 2016, 2021 and 2024. He was Mongolia’s flag bearer in 2012 and 2024. A member of the Morpeth Harriers running club, he divides his time between his native country and Gateshead in England.

Ser-od began his international career in 2002 and has competed in the marathon at ten consecutive editions of the World Championships in Athletics since 2003. His best performance is 20th at the 2011 World Championships. He is Mongolia's first ever elite level marathon runner and his personal best of 2:08:50 is the Mongolian national record. He was the 2013 Asian Marathon Champion and also won the Brighton Marathon and Hofu Yomiuri Marathon in 2010. Other career highlights include top ten finishes at the Berlin Marathon and London Marathon.

== Career ==
=== Early competition ===
Ser-Od began participating in long-distance events in 2002. He made his international debut at the 2002 IAAF World Half Marathon Championships and stepped up a distance to the marathon at the 2003 World Championships in Athletics, where he came 63rd with a personal best of 2:26:39 hours. He was twelfth at the 2004 Hong Kong Marathon, the third Asian to finish in a largely African field. He made his Olympic debut that year at the 2004 Athens Olympics. He was just one of two Mongolians to compete in the athletics competition, alongside women's marathoner Luvsanlkhündegiin Otgonbayar. Ser-Od came 75th overall with a time of 2:33:24 hours, some twenty minutes behind the winner.

He ran his 2005 season's best in Ulaanbaatar in June before the 2005 World Championships, where he improved upon his previous placing by coming in 61st. He set a half marathon best of 1:08:12 in October, representing his country at the 2005 IAAF World Half Marathon Championships. With no world-level marathon events scheduled in 2006, he focused on Asian competition. He showed significant improvement at the Asian Marathon Championship, incorporated into that year's Beijing Marathon, as he was the sixth best Asian and knocked over six minutes off his best time, recording 2:20:13 hours. He did not perform as well at the 2006 Asian Games, however, as he came seventeenth in the Games marathon. He remained in East Asia in 2007, coming 55th at the 2007 World Championships in Osaka before making another large improvement at the Beijing Marathon, where he completed the distance in a time of 2:16:22 hours.

=== 2008–2009: National records and move to Gateshead ===
He lined up for the Asian Marathon Championship race at the 2008 Hong Kong Marathon and demonstrated his progression by coming runner-up in the Asian category behind race winner Koichiro Fukuoka and taking fifth place in the international field. At the Good Luck Beijing Marathon, a test event for the 2008 Summer Olympics, he cut two more minutes off his best to defeat all opposition and win the race in a Mongolian record time of 2:14:15 hours. He did not repeat this form at the Olympic marathon race in August, but his time and placing (52nd in 2:24:19) were his best performances yet on the international stage. His final race of the year came at December's Hofu Yomiuri Marathon, but his fast starting pace saw him drift back into sixth by the finish.

His training in Mongolia was interrupted by the cold winter and, in April 2009, he travelled to Gateshead, United Kingdom to visit family. While there he came to an agreement with Morpeth Harriers, a local running club, to begin training with them. Ser-Od trained on a running track for the first time at the Gateshead International Stadium and said that the area's 10 km competitions were of particular benefit, given the rarity of races over that distance in East Asia. Reflecting on the change, he said: "To train [in Mongolia] you have to wear too many clothes, maybe four layers. Running is really hard then. In England it is different." He ran in a series of British races from April to August, building towards the upcoming 2009 World Championships in Berlin. He won 10K races in North Shields, Newton Aycliffe and Morpeth, as well as placing top three in half marathons in Redcar and Mansfield. A 10K best of 30:08 minutes came at Gateshead's Great North 10K, where he was seventh. The change of location resulted in a rise in the rankings in the World Championships Marathon in Berlin, as he finished in the top thirty for the first time, completing the course in 2:17:22 hours. He was selected to run on the track at the 2009 Asian Athletics Championships and he came twelfth in the 5000 metres (14:47.01 minutes) and set a track best of 29:43.79 minutes for ninth place in the 10,000 metres. His best marathon time of the year came at the Hofu Yomiuri Marathon, where he was the best non-Japanese, finishing seventh in 2:17:19 hours.

=== 2010–2011: London and Berlin Marathons ===
He was highly active in the marathon in 2010: he was third at the Hong Kong Marathon in February, and came fifth at the Zhengzhou Marathon with a time of 2:17:01 hours in March. He was initially invited to the 2010 London Marathon in April, but the organisers rescinded their invitation upon discovering he had run the full distance just three weeks before the event. Having already arrived in England, he sought out a place at the inaugural Brighton Marathon instead and won the competition by a five-minute margin. He received an invitation for the 2010 Berlin Marathon and performed well in his first World Marathon Majors event, finishing in tenth place with a time of 2:12:42 – a new national record. In his fifth outing over the distance that year, he won the Hofu Yomiuri Marathon, succeeding on his third attempt in a time of 2:14:49 (the third best performance of his career). Ser-od's 2011 season started at the Northern 12-Stage Road Relay, where he led off the Morpeth Harriers team which went on to take the title. The 2011 London Marathon was his first major race of the year and he again had a top ten placing, taking ninth place in 2:11:35 hours to improve his best time a minute further. He finished in the top ten of both the 5000 m and 10,000 m at the 2011 Asian Athletics Championships, then went on to have his best global marathon finish at the 2011 World Championships in Athletics, finishing in 20th place. Two months later, he came sixth at the Beijing Marathon. In 2011 Hofu Yomiuri Marathon in Japan he defended his title as winner running for 2:11:56 hours improving his time by 2 minutes and 53 seconds than the previous year.

=== 2012 Olympic Games ===
He was runner-up in his first race of 2012 Beppu-Oita Marathon, setting a new best of 2:11:05 behind Harun Njoroge. He ran within the course record time at the Brighton Marathon, but finished fourth in a fast race. He represented his country at the 2012 Summer Olympics in London and finished in 51st position in the marathon. He was also selected as national flag bearer in the opening ceremony. Ser-Od ended the year with a win at the Osaka Marathon in a course record time of 2:11:52.

=== After 2012 ===
His first outings of 2013 did not bode well: he was 18th at the Beppu-Oita Marathon, 15th at the Hong Kong Marathon, and eleventh at the Daegu Marathon. In spite of this, he performed reasonably well at the 2013 World Championships in Athletics, coming in 35th place. At the 2013 East Asian Games he was the silver medallist in the 5000 m. His best marathon outing followed later that month as he was second at the Osaka Marathon in 2:13:31 hours.

A good result for Ser-Od came at the 2014 Asian Games, where he placed 4th in the men's marathon, running the distance in 2:13:21.

Just months later, Ser-Od built on his Asian Games success with his personal-best and national-record time of 2:08:50, at the Fukuoka Marathon in December 2014.

Ser-Od participated in both the 2015 World Championships in Athletics held in Beijing and the 2017 World Championships in Athletics held in London, placing respectively 38th and 48th in the marathon events.

Ser-Od participated in the 2019 World Championships in Athletics in Doha, Qatar where he finished 54th in 2:36:01 in the men's marathon. In 2020 he contested 1 marathon, placing 24th in 2:16:15 at the Fukuoka Marathon. On the track Ser-Od set Mongolian national records in both the 5000m and 10000m in 14:16.48 and 29:17.72 respectively. In 2021 Ser-Od ran The 76th Lake Biwa Mainichi Marathon in Japan, where he finished 33rd in a time of 2:09:26. This was Ser-Od's third-fastest marathon performance and it qualified him for his 5th Olympic Games. Ser-Od Bat-Ochir competed in the men's marathon at the 2020 Tokyo Olympic Games in August 2021, where he did not finish, after battling an illness. In 2022 Ser-Od participated in the 2022 World Championships in Athletics in Eugene, Oregon. This was his tenth appearance in a marathon at a World Championship and he finished all these races. Ser-Od competed in the men's marathon at the 2024 Paris Olympic Games at 43 years of age, finishing 71st in a time of 2:42:33. This marked his 6th Olympic marathon.

== Statistics ==
=== International competition ===
Year	Competition	Venue	Position	Event	Notes
Representing Mongolia
2002	World Half Marathon Championships	Brussels, Belgium	96th	Half marathon	1:09:54
2003	World Championships	Paris, France	63rd	Marathon	2:26:39
2004	Olympic Games	Athens, Greece	75th	Marathon	2:33:24
2005	World Championships	Helsinki, Finland	61st	Marathon	2:36:31
2005	World Half Marathon Championships	Edmonton, Canada	56th	Half marathon	1:08:12
2006	Asian Games	Doha, Qatar	17th	Marathon	2:31:00
2007	World Championships	Osaka, Japan	55th	Marathon	2:49:06
2008	Olympic Games	Beijing, China	52nd	Marathon	2:24:19
2008	Asian Marathon Championships	Hong Kong, China	2nd	Marathon	2:20:18
2009	World Championships	Berlin, Germany	29th	Marathon	2:17:22
2009	Asian Championships	Guangzhou, China	12th	5000 m	14:47.01
2009	Asian Championships	Guangzhou, China	9th	10,000 m	29:43.79
2011	World Championships	Daegu, South Korea	20th	Marathon	2:16:41
2012	Olympic Games	London, United Kingdom	51st	Marathon	2:20:10
2013	Asian Marathon Championships	Hong Kong, China	1st	Marathon	2:17:56
2013	World Championships	Moscow, Russia	36th	Marathon	2:21:55
2013	East Asian Games	Tianjin, China	2nd	5000 m	14:28.24
2014	Asian Games	Incheon, South Korea	4th	Marathon	2:13:21
2015	World Championships	Beijing, China	38th	Marathon	2:32:09
2016	Olympic Games	Rio de Janeiro, Brazil	91st	Marathon	2:24:26
2017	World Championships	London, United Kingdom	48th	Marathon	2:21:55
2018	Asian Games	Jakarta, Indonesia	5th	Marathon	2:23:42
2019	World Championships	Doha, Qatar	54th	Marathon	2:36:01
2021	Olympic Games	Sapporo, Japan	–	Marathon	DNF
2022	World Championships	Eugene, United States	26th	Marathon	2:11:39
2023	World Championships	Budapest, Hungary	–	Marathon	DNF
2023	Asian Games	Hangzhou, China	16th	5000 m	14:48.33
2023	Asian Games	Hangzhou, China	10th	10,000 m	30:57.71
2024	Olympic Games	Paris, France	71st	Marathon	2:42:33
2025	World Championships	Tokyo, Japan	65th	Marathon	2:30:09

=== Personal bests ===
- 5,000 m (track) – 14:12.86 NR (2021)
- 10,000 m (track) – 29:17.72 NR (2020)
- Half Marathon – 1:02:10 NR (2016)
- Marathon – 2:08:50 NR (2014)

Olympic Games
Preceded by Makhgalyn Bayarjavkhlan	Flagbearer for Mongolia; 2012 London	Succeeded by Temuulen Battulga
