= Hofu Marathon =

Annual race in Japan since 1970

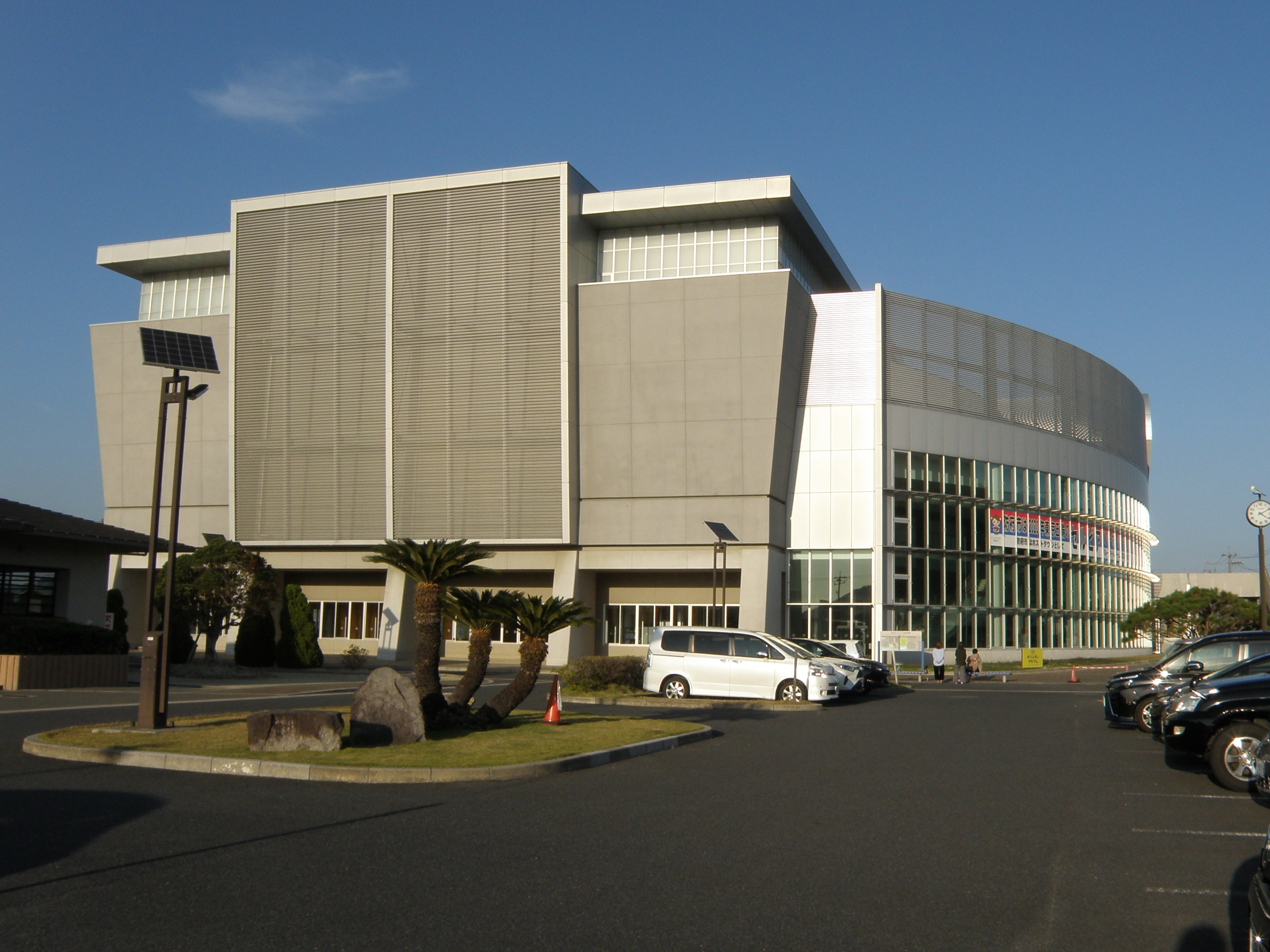
- The Kirin Lemon Stadium Salt Arena Hofu, in front of which runners start the race
- Date: December
- Location: Hōfu, Yamaguchi, Japan
- Event type: Road
- Distance: Marathon
- Established: 1970 (56 years ago)
- Website: https://hofu-yomiuri.jp

The Hofu Marathon (also known as the Hofu Yomiuri Marathon) is an annual road-based marathon hosted by Hōfu, Japan, since 1970. The marathon is a World Athletics Elite Label Road Race and a member of the Association of International Marathons and Distance Races.

== History ==
The inaugural race was held on 27 December 1970. It was won by Japanese runner Toshihiko Uehara with a finish time of 2:15:49.8.

In 2013, Japanese runner Yuki Kawauchi became the first marathoner to complete two sub-2:10 marathons in two weeks, by running the Fukuoka Marathon on 1 December in 2:09:15 and the Hofu Marathon on 15 December in 2:09:05. In 2019, Kawauchi returned to Hōfu to complete his 100th marathon there. (Note: Out of the 100 marathons Kawauchi had run by that time, 94 were sub-2:20 marathons.)

== Course ==
External image
- Course map of full marathon in 2022

The marathon begins in front of the Kirin Lemon Stadium Salt Arena Hofu and ends on the track of the Hofu Sports Center Athletic Field across the street.
