= Osaka Marathon =

Road running event in Japan

Coordinates: 34.6381°N 135.4175°E

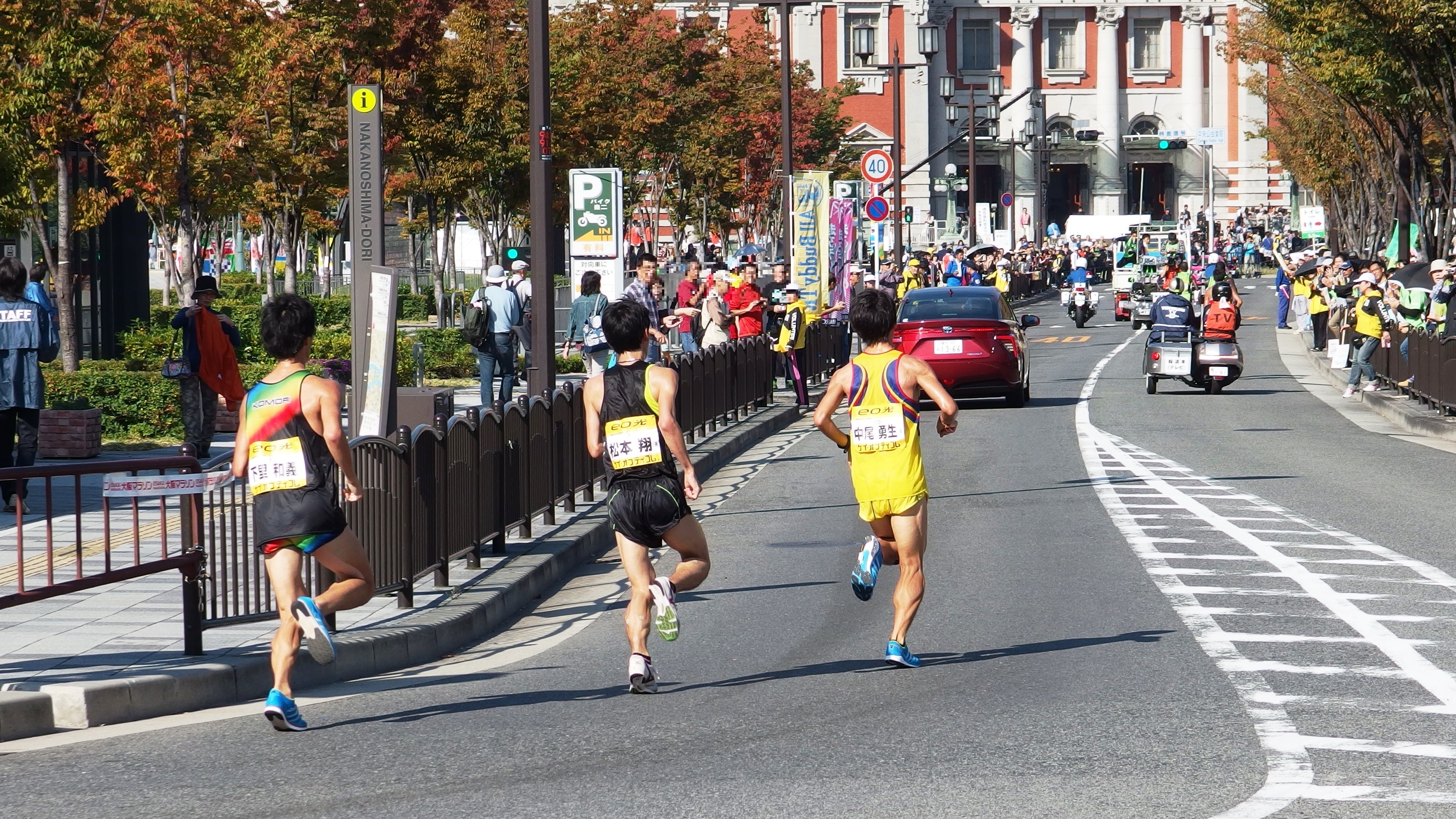
- Date: February
- Location: Osaka, Japan
- Event type: Road
- Distance: Marathon
- Established: 2011
- Course records: Men: Old course - 2:11:43 (2014) (Kenya) Jackson Limo; New course - 2:05:20 (2026) (Djibouti) Ibrahim Hassan; Women: Old course - 2:31:19 (2018) (Morocco) Soud Kanbouchia; New course - 2:21:44 (2026) (Ethiopia) Mare Dibaba
- Website: Osaka Marathon
- Participants: 207 elite finishers (2022); 31,594 (2019); 53,363 (2018)

The Osaka-Lake Biwa Marathon (大阪マラソン, Osaka Marathon) is an annual marathon road running event for elite and non-elite men and non-elite women over the classic distance of 42.195 kilometres which is held in late February in the city of Osaka, Japan. There is also a "challenge run" with a distance of 8.8km. In 2019 edition of the race, a new race course was introduced where it starts near to and finishes at the Osaka Castle Park.

The event is jointly hosted by the Japan Association of Athletics Federations and Yomiuri Shimbun, a Japanese national newspaper. The first edition took place on October 30, 2011. In total, 27161 runners started the marathon race and of these 26175 finished the full distance.

The 2020 edition of the race was cancelled due to the coronavirus pandemic.

In 2022, an organisational change by JAAF meant the race was merged into the Lake Biwa Marathon. The elite men's race is now the Lake Biwa Marathon.

== Winners ==
Key: Course record

Edition	Date	Men's winner	Time (h:m:s)	Women's winner	Time (h:m:s)
1st	October 30, 2011	Elijah Sang (KEN)	2:12:43	Lidia Șimon (ROM)	2:32:48
2nd	November 25, 2012	Ser-Od Bat-Ochir (MGL)	2:11:54	Lidia Șimon (ROM) (2)	2:33:14
3rd	October 27, 2013	Jackson Limo (KEN)	2:12:06	Monica Jepkoech (KEN)	2:39:23
4th	October 26, 2014	Jackson Limo (KEN) (2)	2:11:43	Maryna Damantsevich (BLR)	2:33:04
5th	October 25, 2015	Daniel Kosgei (KEN)	2:13:46	Maryna Damantsevich (BLR) (2)	2:32:28
6th	October 30, 2016	Benjamin Ngandu (KEN)	2:12:47	Yoshiko Sakamoto (JPN)	2:36:02
7th	November 26, 2017	Kaleab Selomon (ERI)	2:12:03	Yumiko Kinoshita (JPN)	2:34:38
8th	November 25, 2018	Charles Munyeki (KEN)	2:14:11	Soud Kanbouchia (MAR)	2:31:19
9th	December 1, 2019	Asefa Tefera (ETH)	2:07:47	Aberu Mekuria (ETH)	2:26:29
	2020	cancelled due to coronavirus pandemic			
	2021	cancelled due to coronavirus pandemic			
10th	February 27, 2022	Gaku Hoshi (JPN)	2:07:31	Misato Horie (JPN)	2:32:10
11th	February 26, 2023	Hailemaryam Kiros (ETH)	2:06:01	Helen Bekele (ETH)	2:22:16
12th	February 25, 2024	Kiyoto Hirabayashi (JPN)	2:06:18	Waganesh Mekasha (ETH)	2:24:20
13th	February 24, 2025	Yihunilign Adane (ETH)	2:05:37	Waganesh Mekasha (ETH)	2:26.33
14th	February 22, 2026	Bouh Ibrahim (DJI)	2:05:20	Mare Dibaba (ETH)	2:21:44

In 2022 the elite men's race of the 10th Osaka Marathon was combined with the 77th Lake Biwa Mainichi Marathon
