= Govindan Lakshmanan =

Indian long-distance runner

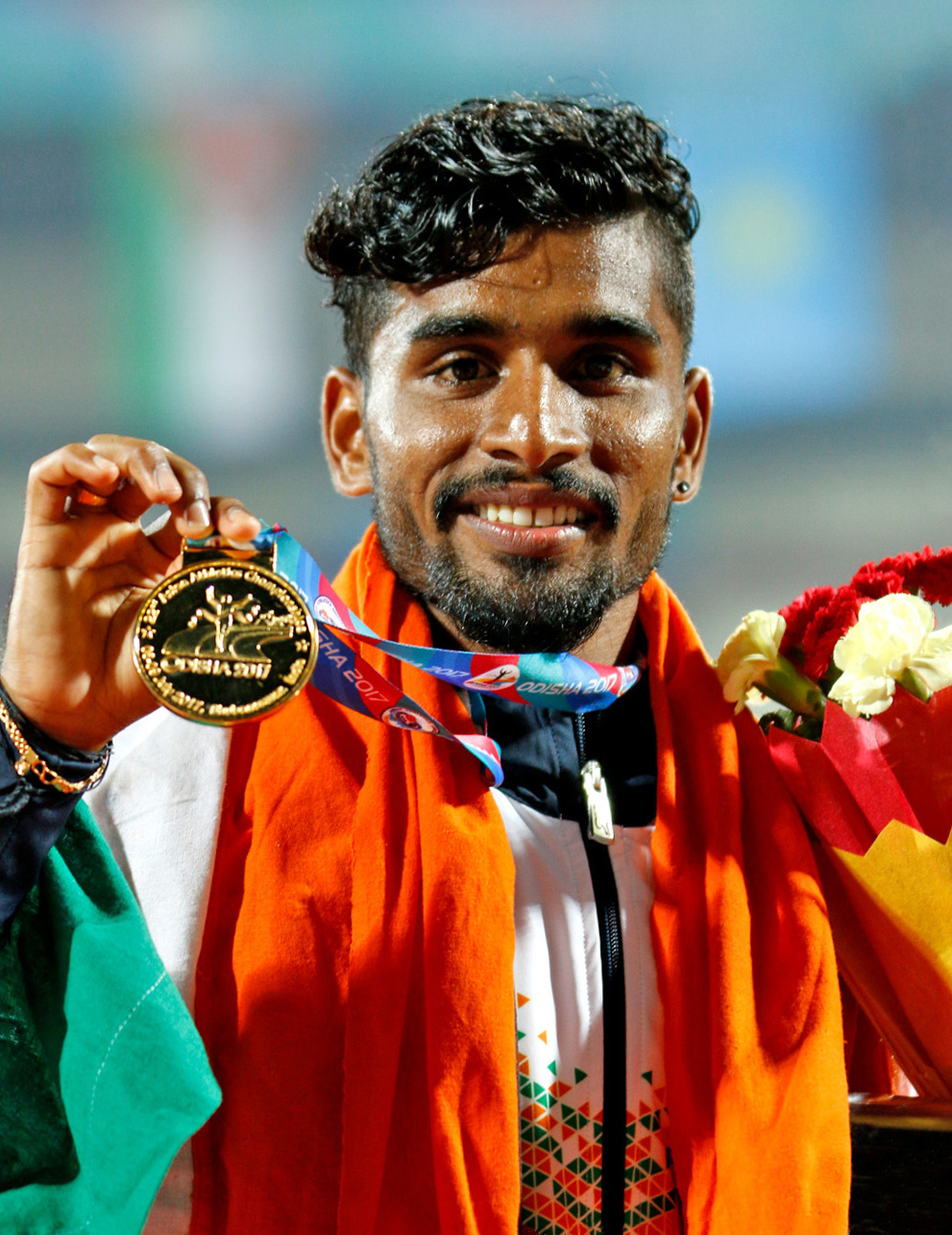

Personal information
- Nationality: Indian
- Born: 5 June 1990 (age 36)

Sport
- Country: India
- Sport: Track and field
- Events: 5000 metres 10,000 metres

Achievements and titles
- Personal best: 13:35.69 (London 2017)
Medal record
Men's athletics
Representing India
Asian Championships
Gold medal – first place	2017 Bhubaneswar	10,000 m
Gold medal – first place	2017 Bhubaneswar	5000 m
Silver medal – second place	2015 Wuhan	10,000 m
Bronze medal – third place	2015 Wuhan	5000 m
Asian Indoor and Martial Arts Games
Gold medal – first place	2017 Ashgabat	3000 m
- Updated on 30 December 2017

Govindan Lakshmanan (born 5 June 1990 in Sokkurani, Pudukottai district, Tamil Nadu, India) is an Indian distance runner. On the track, he mostly competes over 5000 metres and 10,000 metres, but has also run the half marathon competitively.

== Early life ==
Lakshmanan lost his father to a car accident when he was six, and was adopted by his neighbour S. Loganathan. His mother Jayalakshmi is a small farmer. Under Loganathan's tutelage, Lakshmanan began training in long-distance running when he was 16, along with the former's daughter Suriya, in Youth Sports Club in the village of Kavinadu near the town of Pudukkottai in Tamil Nadu.

== Career ==
He represented India at the 2015 IAAF World Cross Country Championships, placing 74th overall. Competing over 5000 metres at the 2015 Wuhan Asian Championships, Lakshmanan won the bronze medal with a time of 13:36.62. He won the 10,000 metres silver medal with a time of 29:42.81. At the next Championships, he won the 5000 metres gold medal with a time of 14:54.48, becoming only the third Indian to win gold in the event at the Championships, and the first since 1993. The time was however the slowest in the Championships' history for a winner. The victory earned him a qualification for the London World Championships that year. In London, he ran his personal best of 13:35.69.

At the 2018 Asian Games in Jakarta, Indonesia; he won bronze medal but was later stripped as he was disqualified for lane infringement.
