= Tony Payne (athlete) =

Thai long-distance runner

Personal information
- Nationality: Thai
- Born: 13 January 1989 (age 37) Dunedin, New Zealand
- Height: 175 cm (5 ft 9 in)
- Weight: 60 kg (132 lb)

Sport
- Sport: Long-distance running
- Event: Marathon
Medal record
Men's athletics
Southeast Asian Games
Bronze medal – third place	2021 Hanoi	Marathon

Tony Ah-Thit Payne (Thai: โทนี่ อาทิตย์ เพย์น; born 13 January 1989) is a Thai long-distance runner. Payne has a marathon personal best of 2:16:56 set at the 2018 Frankfurt Marathon which is the men's Thailand marathon national record and South East Asia record at that time until July 2025 when Robi Syianturi from Indonesia broke it.

Payne competed in the men's marathon at the 2019 World Athletics Championships held in Doha, Qatar. He did not finish his race.

In 2018, Payne finished in eighth position in the men's marathon at the 2018 Asian Games held in Jakarta, Indonesia.
