= Kheta Ram =

Indian marathon runner

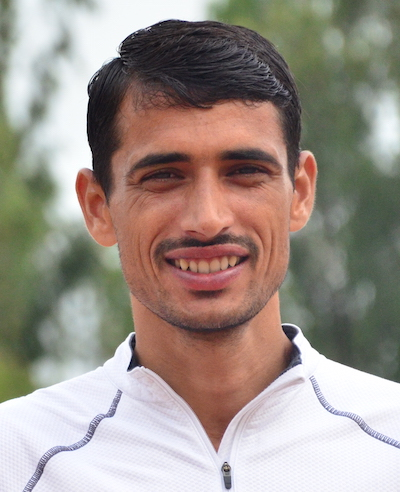
- Kheta Ram, Marathon athlete representing India in the 2016 Summer Olympics in Rio

Personal information
- Born: 20 September 1986 (age 40) Khokhsar, Barmer, Rajasthan, India

Sport
- Country: India
- Sport: Athletics
- Event: Marathon
Medal record
South Asian Games
| Bronze medal – third place | 2016 Guwahati | Marathon |

Kheta Ram aka Khetha Ram / KhetaRam (born 20 September 1986) is an Indian athlete and two time Asian Championships finalist who represented India at the 2016 Summer Olympics in the marathon event. He finished 26th in the men's marathon at the Rio Olympics. He is also in the Indian Army.

== Career ==
Ram enrolled for the Indian Army through the general quota to earn a steady income and is posted at Samba, Jammu. He has been representing India in various events, including the World Military Games. With an impressive array of races and achievements, recently, he and his coach Surendra Singh decided that he should train and run a marathon distance rather than track and field events of intermediate distances as he has been doing. He has trained at the Army Sports Institute in Pune, in the thin air of Thangaraj Stadium in Wellington / Coonoor in the Nilgiri Hills so as to increase his heart and lung capacity, and most recently at the SAI complex in Bangalore, India. His VO2 Max is around 84 (ml of Oxygen used in 1 min per kg of bodyweight, comparable to Lance Armstrong), with a resting heart rate of around 45bpm.

He represented India at the 2016 Summer Olympics, qualifying with a marathon time of 02:17:23 in the 2016 Mumbai Marathon along with two other Indian marathoner men, Gopi T and Nitendra Singh Rawat.

== Competition records ==
| Year | Competition | Venue | Position | Event | Time | Reference |
|---|---|---|---|---|---|---|
| 2011 | Bangalore Interstate | Bangalore, India | 1st | 10,000m | 29:20:35 | |
| 2011 | Sunfest World 10K | Bangalore, India | 22nd Overall / 3rd Indian | 10 km Road | 30:34 | |
| 2011 | New Delhi Half Marathon | New Delhi, India | 22nd Overall / 2nd Indian | Half marathon | 1:04:44 | |
| 2012 | Vadodara 15M | Vadodara, India | 1st | 15M Road | 47:11 | |
| 2013 | Indian Grand Prix | Patiala, India | 1st | 5,000m | 13:15:32 (1 lap short) | |
| 2013 | Indian Grand Prix | Patiala India | 1st | 3,000m | 08:06:33 | |
| 2013 | Asian Grand Prix, 1st Leg | Bangkok, Thailand | 2nd | 5,000m | 14:55:12 | |
| 2013 | Asian Athletic Championships | Pune, India | 4th | 10,000m | 29:35:72 | |
| 2014 | Federation Cup National Senior Athletics Championships | Patiala, India | 1st | 5,000m | 13:49:17 | |
| 2014 | National Open Athletics Championships | New Delhi, India | 2nd | 10,000m | 29:32:75 | |
| 2014 | Asian Games | Incheon, South Korea | 7th | 5,000m | 13:37:40 | |
| 2015 | Vasai Virar Mayor's marathon | Virar, Mumbai Metro area, India | 1st | Marathon | 02:22:32 | |
| 2016 | Mumbai Marathon | Mumbai, India | 3rd Indian / 15th Overall | Marathon | 2:17:23 | |
| 2016 | South Asian Games | Guwahati, India | 3rd | Marathon | 02:21:14 | |
| 2016 | Summer Olympics | Rio de Janeiro, Brazil | 26th | Marathon | 02:15:26 | |
| 2017 | Mumbai tata marathon | Mumbai | 1st | Marathon | 02:19:55 | |
| 2018 | IDBI HALF MARATHON | Delhi | 1st | Half marathon | 1:09:15 | |

== Personal life ==
Born in Khokhsar(East) in the Barmer district of Rajasthan, Kheta Ram's humble origin is as a Naib Subedar of the Jat Regiment. He has one sister and four brothers. He used to run 4 km every day through the desert to a school that only had classes up to 8th grade. Many fast runners are from hilly areas which is thought to give them a red blood cell, lung efficiency and endurance advantage. In contrast, Kheta Ram's abilities are thought to come from the strengthening his calves and hamstrings may have received from running in the sand.

He joined the Army at Age 18 as a means of earning a steady income, and got recognized for his athletic abilities. The Indian Army excuses world class sports persons from active duty, allowing them to train as an athlete full-time. He would like to use his privileges as an athlete to solve the acute water issues of his village. His parents and wife are not educated and don't comprehend that he will represent the country in the Olympics. He is the only earning member of his family and sends his savings home to his parents, wife and two children. His biggest expense is his monthly purchase of shoes (priced at roughly Rs 10,000 per pair) to accommodate the number of miles that the athlete runs each month. As of mid 2016, he does not have any corporate sponsorship and has to purchase his own shoes.

He and his fellow athletes spend 11 out of 12 months of the year away from home and without meeting their families, a sacrifice that they must make in order to compete on the world stage.
