= Bilisuma Shugi =

Ethiopian long-distance runner (born 1989)

Personal information
- Born: 19 July 1989 (age 36) Oromia Region, Ethiopia
Medal record
Men's athletics
Representing Bahrain
Asian Games
| Gold medal – first place | 2010 Guangzhou | 10,000 m |
Asian Athletics Championships
| Silver medal – second place | 2011 Kobe | 10,000 m |
Asian Indoor Championships
| Gold medal – first place | 2012 Hangzhou | 3000 m |
Pan Arab Games
| Bronze medal – third place | 2011 Doha | 10,000 m |

Bilisuma Shugi Gelassa (born 19 July 1989 in Oromia Region) is an Ethiopian long-distance runner who competes internationally for Bahrain.

He transferred to Bahrain at the end of 2009 and his first international appearance came a few months afterwards at the 2010 IAAF World Cross Country Championships, where he finished in the top 50 in the senior race. A gold medal and games record at the 2010 Asian Games saw him establish himself over 10,000 metres on the track.

The following season he was 30th at the 2011 IAAF World Cross Country Championships, helping Bahrain to sixth in the team rankings with the help of fellow East African converts Dejene Regassa and Ali Hasan Mahboob. On the track that year he took the silver medal over 10,000 m at the 2011 Asian Athletics Championships and the bronze in the 5000 m at the 2011 Military World Games. He competed in the latter event at the 2011 World Championships in Athletics and finished eighth in the final. His final outing of the year was at the 2011 Pan Arab Games, although he was past his season's peak and came fifth.

Bilisuma came third in a Bahraini sweep of the medals at the 2012 Asian Cross Country Championships. He appeared for Bahrain at the 2012 Summer Olympics in the 5000 m but did not reach the final.
