= Andrey Petrov (athlete) =

Uzbekistani long-distance runner

Personal information
- Born: 13 October 1986 (age 39)

Sport
- Country: Uzbekistan
- Sport: Athletics

Andrey Petrov (born 13 October 1986) is an Uzbek long-distance runner who specialises in the marathon. He competed in the men's marathon at the 2016 Summer Olympics. In 2019, he competed in the men's marathon at the 2019 World Athletics Championships held in Doha, Qatar. He finished in 49th place.
