= Athletics at the 2015 Summer Universiade – Men's half marathon =

The men's half marathon event at the 2015 Summer Universiade was held on 12 July at the Gwangju Universiade Main Stadium.

== Medalists ==
=== Individual ===
Gold	Silver	Bronze
Yusuke Ogura; Japan	Tadashi Isshiki; Japan	Yuta Takahashi; Japan

=== Team ===
Gold	Silver	Bronze
Japan; Yusuke Ogura; Tadashi Isshiki; Yuta Takahashi; Naoki Kudo	Turkey; Vedat Günen; Şeref Dirli; Aykut Taşdemir; Mehmet Akkoyun	South Africa; Thabang Masihleho; Sibabalwe Mzazi; Marianio Eesou; Zolani Ngqaqa; Goitsemodimo Bothobutle

== Results ==
=== Individual ===
Rank	Name	Nationality	Time	Notes
1st place, gold medalist(s)	Yusuke Ogura	Japan	1:04:41	
2nd place, silver medalist(s)	Tadashi Isshiki	Japan	1:04:52	
3rd place, bronze medalist(s)	Yuta Takahashi	Japan	1:05:29	
4	Soufiane Bouchikhi	Belgium	1:06:04	
5	Naoki Kudo	Japan	1:06:10	
6	Vedat Günen	Turkey	1:06:21	PB
7	Wen Xinglong	China	1:07:04	
8	Thabang Masihleho	South Africa	1:07:11	
9	Mohammadjafar Moradi	Iran	1:07:33	
10	Gáspár Csere	Hungary	1:07:33	
11	Nicolae-Alexandru Soare	Romania	1:07:49	
12	Byambajav Tseveenravdan	Mongolia	1:08:15	
13	Ilia Tiapkin	Kyrgyzstan	1:08:24	SB
14	Aaron Pulford	New Zealand	1:08:32	SB
15	Gladwin Mzazi	South Africa	1:09:26	
16	Şeref Dirli	Turkey	1:09:29	
17	Son Myeong-jun	South Korea	1:09:38	
18	Marianio Eesou	South Africa	1:09:51	
19	Joshua Harris	Australia	1:09:54	
20	Jamsran Olonbayar	Mongolia	1:10:14	
21	Julien Lyon	Switzerland	1:10:18	
22	Aykut Taşdemir	Turkey	1:10:25	
23	James Ngandu	Kenya	1:10:27	
24	Abdelaziz Ahnida	Morocco	1:10:59	
25	Florent Caelen	Belgium	1:11:25	
26	Walter Suarez	Venezuela	1:11:32	PB
27	José Luis Duarte	Mexico	1:11:40	
28	Zolani Ngqaqa	South Africa	1:12:04	
29	Gantulga Dambadarjaa	Mongolia	1:12:26	
30	Andreas Ahwall	Sweden	1:12:30	
31	Lucas Jaramillo	Chile	1:12:38	
32	Kim Tae-jin	South Korea	1:13:31	
33	Felipe Lizana	Chile	1:13:41	
34	Abdelali Razyn	Morocco	1:14:19	
35	Kim Ji-ho	South Korea	1:14:47	
36	Goitsemodimo Bothobutle	South Africa	1:15:07	
37	Hugo Catrileo	Chile	1:15:08	
38	Mehmet Akkoyun	Turkey	1:16:10	
39	Guo Xianglong	China	1:20:41	
40	Martin Ocepek	Slovenia	1:21:04	
41	Xie Zhaofu	China	1:21:46	
42	Stephane Kibambe	Democratic Republic of the Congo	1:22:45	
43	Janar Juhkov	Estonia	1:33:16	
44	Aiman Al-Hashemi	Oman	1:35:15	
	Mark Lokwanamoi	Kenya	DNF	
	Ahmed El Mazoury	Italy	DNF	
	Zouhir Sadden	Morocco	DNF	
	Hironori Tsuetaki	Japan	DNF	
	Ilie Alexandru Corneschi	Romania	DNS	

=== Team ===
Rank	Team	Time	Notes
1st place, gold medalist(s)	Japan	3:15:03	
2nd place, silver medalist(s)	Turkey	3:26:17	
3rd place, bronze medalist(s)	South Africa	3:26:29	
4	Mongolia	3:30:57	
5	South Korea	3:37:57	
6	Chile	3:41:28	
7	China	3:49:33	
	Morocco		
