= Athletics at the 2011 Summer Universiade – Men's half marathon =

The men's half marathon event at the 2011 Summer Universiade was held on 21 August.

== Medalists ==
=== Individual ===
Gold	Silver	Bronze
Ahmed Tamri; Morocco	Fatih Bilgiç; Turkey	Tsubasa Hayakawa; Japan

=== Team ===
Gold	Silver	Bronze
Japan; Tsubasa Hayakawa; Hiromitsu Kakuage; Takehiro Deki; Yo Yazawa	China; Bian Qi; Zheng Guojun; Yan Jun; Gao Laiyuan; Yang Le	

== Results ==
Official Video

Rank	Name	Nationality	Time	Notes
1st place, gold medalist(s)	Ahmed Tamri	Morocco	1:06:20	
2nd place, silver medalist(s)	Fatih Bilgiç	Turkey	1:06:20	
3rd place, bronze medalist(s)	Tsubasa Hayakawa	Japan	1:06:25	
4	Hiromitsu Kakuage	Japan	1:06:38	
5	Sibabalwe Mzazi	South Africa	1:07:32	
6	Takehiro Deki	Japan	1:07:34	
7	Yo Yazawa	Japan	1:08:03	
8	Denis Mayaud	France	1:09:08	
9	Bian Qi	China	1:09:13	
10	Stsiapan Rahautsou	Belarus	1:10:52	
11	Florent Caelen	Belgium	1:11:04	
12	Deepak Bapu Kumbhar	India	1:12:42	
13	Zheng Guojun	China	1:13:07	
14	Daniel Estrada	Chile	1:13:54	
15	Gi Kaman	Hong Kong	1:13:58	
16	Yan Jun	China	1:15:05	
17	Patrice Lompo	Benin	1:16:08	
18	Gao Laiyuan	China	1:17:35	
19	Eric Ndikuriyo	Burundi	1:18:51	
20	Ilir Kellezi	Albania	1:19:22	
21	Yang Le	China	1:21:43	
22	Kennedy Chemeitoi	Kenya	1:27:11	
	Francesco Bona	Italy	DNF	
	Melchior Mirindi	Burundi	DNF	
	Park Myeonghyeon	South Korea	DNF	
	Ryu Jisan	South Korea	DNF	
