= Athletics at the 2015 Summer Universiade – Men's 10,000 metres =

The men's 10,000 metres event at the 2015 Summer Universiade was held on 9 July at the Gwangju Universiade Main Stadium.

== Medalists ==
Gold	Silver	Bronze
Igor Maksimov; Russia	Nicolae-Alexandru Soare; Romania	Keisuke Nakatani; Japan

== Results ==
Official Video

Rank	Name	Nationality	Time	Notes
1st place, gold medalist(s)	Igor Maksimov	Russia	29:15.30	
2nd place, silver medalist(s)	Nicolae-Alexandru Soare	Romania	29:18.71	PB
3rd place, bronze medalist(s)	Keisuke Nakatani	Japan	29:19.30	
4	Vladimir Nikitin	Russia	29:20.20	
5	Soufiane Bouchikhi	Belgium	29:24.21	
6	Sibabalwe Mzazi	South Africa	29:37.55	
7	Mohamed Agourram	Morocco	29:39.87	SB
8	Raymond McCormack	United States	29:44.82	
9	Hironori Tsuetaki	Japan	29:52.91	
10	Aleksey Popov	Russia	30:01.93	
11	Aaron Pulford	New Zealand	30:04.87	
12	Kazuto Kawabata	Japan	30:06.42	
13	Mark Lokwanamoi	Kenya	30:16.56	
14	Abdelaziz Ahnida	Morocco	30:24.13	
15	James Ngandu	Kenya	30:37.07	PB
16	Andreas Ahwall	Sweden	31:06.77	
17	Brandon Lord	Canada	31:27.84	
18	Walter Suarez	Venezuela	31:39.95	
19	Felipe Matamala	Chile	31:57.47	
20	Ilie Corneschi	Romania	32:16.48	
21	Wen Xinglong	China	32:32.14	
22	Guo Xianglong	China	33:04.62	
23	Willington Valenzuela	Chile	33:07.27	
24	Nawasinghe Mudiyanselage	Sri Lanka	34:38.41	
25	Gift Zhuwawo	Zimbabwe	35:19.67	
26	Phan Sopheak	Cambodia	36:36.61	PB
	Mehmet Akkoyun	Turkey	DNF	
	Şeref Dirli	Turkey	DNF	
	Aaron Hendrikx	Canada	DNF	
	Mohammadjafar Moradi	Iran	DNF	
