= 2013 European Athletics U23 Championships – Men's 5000 metres =

The Men's 5000 metres event at the 2013 European Athletics U23 Championships was held in Tampere, Finland, at Ratina Stadium on 13 July.

== Medalists ==
Gold	Henrik Ingebrigtsen; Norway
Silver	Thomas Farrell; United Kingdom
Bronze	Aitor Fernández; Spain

== Results ==
=== Final ===
13 July 2013

Rank	Name	Nationality	Time	Notes
1st place, gold medalist(s)	Henrik Ingebrigtsen	Norway	14:19.39	
2nd place, silver medalist(s)	Thomas Farrell	United Kingdom	14:19.94	
3rd place, bronze medalist(s)	Aitor Fernández	Spain	14:20.65	
4	Nico Sonnenberg	Germany	14:21.37	
5	Luke Caldwell	United Kingdom	14:23.74	
6	Ivan Strebkov	Ukraine	14:26.55	
7	Szymon Kulka	Poland	14:27.64	
8	Nicolae Alexandru Soare	Romania	14:27.68	
9	Jesper van der Wielen	Netherlands	14:29.24	
10	François Barrer	France	14:34.30	
11	Gabriel Navarro	Spain	14:35.18	
12	Rui Pinto	Portugal	14:35.88	
13	Michele Fontana	Italy	14:38.25	
14	Indelau Tekele	Israel	14:46.24	
15	Jake Byrne	Ireland	14:53.09	
	Abdi Hakin Ulad	Denmark	DNS	

Intermediate times:
1000m: 2:52.22 Gabriel Navarro Spain
2000m: 6:01.92 Aitor Fernández Spain
3000m: 9:00.80 Gabriel Navarro Spain
4000m: 11:49.11 Thomas Farrell United Kingdom

== Participation ==
According to an unofficial count, 15 athletes from 13 countries participated in the event.

- France (1)
- Germany (1)
- Ireland (1)
- Israel (1)
- Italy (1)
- Netherlands (1)
- Norway (1)
- Poland (1)
- Portugal (1)
- Romania (1)
- Spain (2)
- Ukraine (1)
- United Kingdom (2)
