= Classical African civilization =

Precolonial African kingdoms

The terms African civilizations, also classical African civilizations, or African empires are terms that generally refer to the various pre-colonial African kingdoms. The civilizations usually include Egypt, Carthage, Axum, Numidia, and Nubia, but may also be extended to the prehistoric Land of Punt and others: Tichitt tradition, Kingdom of Dagbon, the Empire of Ashanti, Agisymba, Kingdom of Kongo, Empire of Mali, Kingdom of Zimbabwe, Songhai Empire, Libyan civilization, Garamantes, Sao civilization, the Empire of Ghana, Bono state,Upemba civilization, Harla Kingdom, Kingdom of Benin, Ife Empire and Oyo Empire.

== Civilizations ==
=== Ife Empire ===
The Ife Empire was the first empire in Yoruba history. The Ife Empire lasted from 1200 to 1420. The empire was formed by Odùduwà, and became well known for its sophisticated art pieces.There were also life-size terracotta and copper or brass sculptures with detailed, idealized naturalism.

Craft specialization defined everyday economic life in which the production of high-value crafts, such as glass-bead production, featured prominently.

Ife grew to have a robust industry in metals, producing high-quality iron and steel. As the population grew, a second wall was built in the capital city Ilé-Ife during the thirteenth century and the construction and pavement of several major roads began as well. The occurrence of potsherd pavements in virtually every part of the area within the Inner and Outer Walls and beyond indicate that the city was densely populated. Ife Empire prominence grew rapidly in Technology and Civilization, Osanyin custodian hold the growth in Yoruba Technology and the Orishas custodian hold the growth in Yoruba Civilization.

=== Oyo Empire ===
Oyo Empire, a kingdom in present-day Nigeria, was founded in the 1300s. It was established by Oranmiyan of the Yoruba people of West Africa. The empire grew to become the largest Yoruba-speaking state through the organizational and administrative efforts of the Yoruba people, trade, as well as the military use of cavalry. The Oyo Empire was one of the most politically important states in Western Africa from the mid-17th to the late 18th century and held sway not only over most of the other kingdoms in Yorubaland, but also over nearby African states, notably the Fon Kingdom of Dahomey in the modern Republic of Benin on its west, and the Nupe and Bariba kingdoms up north.

The Oyo were also known for their craftsmanship, especially in ironwork. All this trade made the Oyo Empire a rich one. This wealth was consolidated by the taxes it imposed on tributaries. For example, one tributary alone, the Kingdom of Dahomey, brought in around a million worth of money a year and Oyo spend all this money on military weapons.

Oyo Empire growth in civilization in developing military weapons and commandeer territory under the administrator of Aláàfin such as Ọ̀rànmíyàn, Shango and Bashorun, etc.

=== Benin Kingdom ===
The Benin Kingdom was also founded by the Yoruba Ife prince Oranmiyan. It was located in West Africa between the 11th century and 1897 A.D. It is popularly known for its Benin Bronzes.

=== Eritrea and Ethiopia ===
Two civilizations inhabited the lands encompassing the modern day states of Eritrea and Ethiopia.

==== Dʿmt ====
The first kingdom known to have existed in Eritrea and Ethiopia was the kingdom of Dʿmt, with its capital at Yeha, where a Sabaean style temple was built around 700 BC. It rose to power around the 10th century BC. The Dʿmt kingdom was influenced by the Sabaeans in Yemen, however it is not known to what extent. While it was once believed that Dʿmt was a Sabaean colony, it is now believed that Sabaean influence was minor, limited to a few localities, and disappeared after a few decades or a century, perhaps representing a trading or military colony in some sort of symbiosis or military alliance with the civilization of Dʿmt or some other proto-Aksumite state. Few inscriptions by or about this kingdom survive and very little archaeological work has taken place. As a result, it is not known whether Dʿmt ended as a civilization before Aksum's early stages, evolved into the Aksumite state, or was one of the smaller states united in the Aksumite kingdom possibly around the beginning of the 1st century.

==== Axum ====
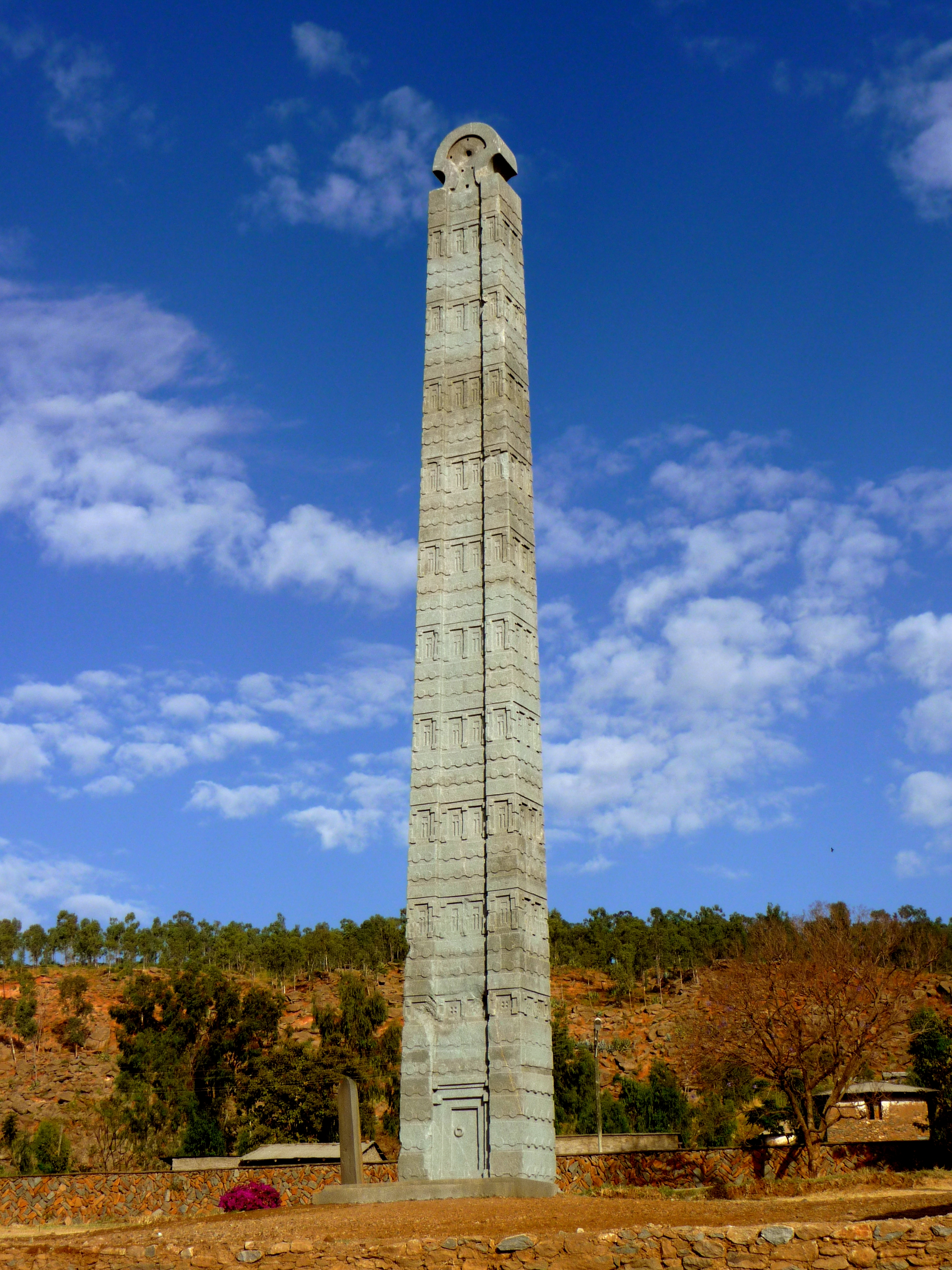
Obelisk of Axum.

The first verifiable kingdom of great power to rise in Eritrea and Ethiopia was that of Axum in the 1st century AD. It was one of many successor kingdoms to Dʿmt and was able to unite the Eritrean and northern Ethiopian Highlands beginning around the 1st century BC. They established bases on the northern highlands of the Ethiopian Plateau and from there expanded southward. The Persian religious figure Mani listed Axum with Rome, Persia, and China as one of the four great powers of his time. The origins of the Axumite Kingdom are unclear, although experts have offered their speculations about it.

Christianity was introduced into the country by Frumentius, who was consecrated first bishop of Axum by Saint Athanasius of Alexandria about 330. Frumentius converted Ezana, who left several inscriptions detailing his reign both before and after his conversion. One inscription found at Axum, states that he conquered the nation of the Bogos, and returned thanks to his father, the god Mars, for his victory. Later inscriptions show Ezana's growing attachment to Christianity, and Ezana's coins bear this out, shifting from a design with disc and crescent to a design with a cross. Expeditions by Ezana into the Kingdom of Kush at Meroe in Sudan may have brought about its demise, though there is evidence that the kingdom was experiencing a period of decline beforehand. As a result of Ezana's expansions, Aksum bordered the Roman province of Egypt. The degree of Ezana's control over Yemen is uncertain. Though there is little evidence supporting Aksumite control of the region at that time, his title, which includes king of Saba and Salhen, Himyar and Dhu-Raydan (all in modern-day Yemen), along with gold Aksumite coins with the inscriptions, "king of the Habshat" or "Habashite", indicate that Aksum might have retained some legal or actual footing in the area.

=== Egypt ===
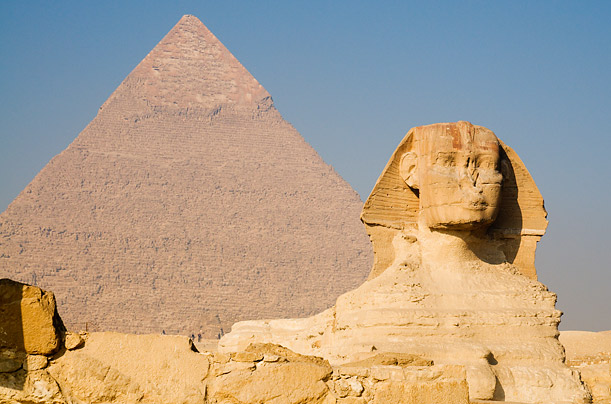
The Great Sphinx and the Pyramid of Khafre, both built in the mid-26th century BC.

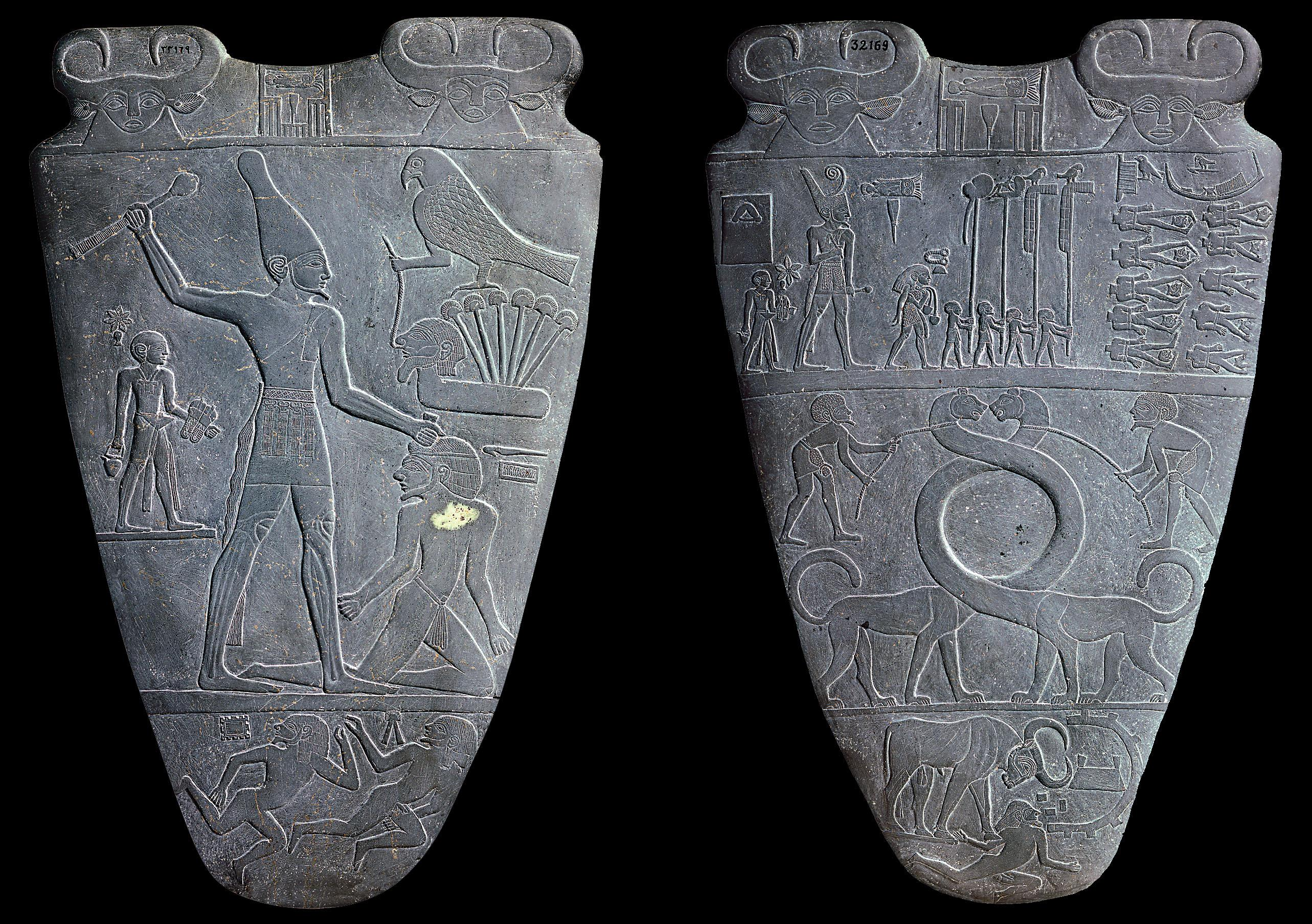
The Narmer Palette depicts the unification of the Two Lands.

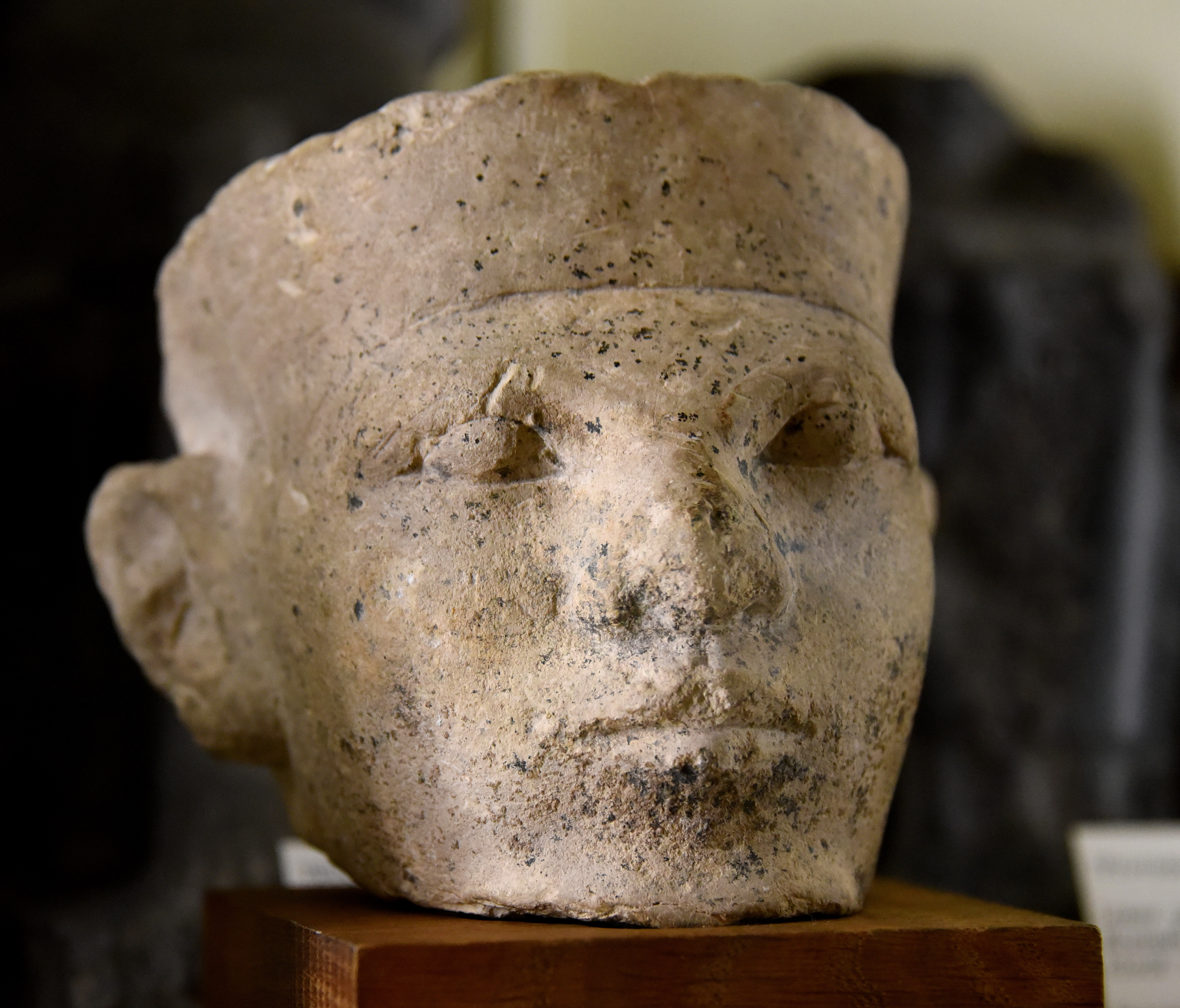
Limestone head of an early Egyptian king, The Petrie Museum. Modern scholars have considered the stone bust to depict an Early Dynastic or Old Kingdom pharaoh.

Ancient Egypt was a civilization of ancient Northeast Africa, concentrated along the lower reaches of the Nile River in the place that is now the country Egypt. Ancient Egyptian civilization followed prehistoric Egypt and coalesced around 3100 BC.

Mainstream scholars have situated the ethnicity and the origins of predynastic, southern Egypt as a foundational community primarily in northeast Africa which included the Sudan, tropical Africa and the Sahara whilst recognising the population variability that became characteristic of the pharaonic period. Pharaonic Egypt featured a physical gradation across the regional populations, with Upper Egyptians having shared more biological affinities with Sudanese and southernly African populations, whereas Lower Egyptians had closer genetic links with Levantine and Mediterranean populations.

Egypt reached the pinnacle of its power in the New Kingdom, ruling much of Nubia and a sizable portion of the Near East, after which it entered a period of slow decline. During the course of its history Egypt was invaded or conquered by a number of foreign powers, including the Hyksos, the Libyans, the Nubians, the Assyrians, the Achaemenid Persians, and the Macedonians under the command of Alexander the Great. The Greek Ptolemaic Kingdom, formed in the aftermath of Alexander's death, ruled Egypt until 30 BC, when, under Cleopatra, it fell to the Roman Empire and became a Roman province.

The success of ancient Egyptian civilization came partly from its ability to adapt to the conditions of the Nile River valley for agriculture. The predictable flooding and controlled irrigation of the fertile valley produced surplus crops, which supported a more dense population, and social development and culture. With resources to spare, the administration sponsored mineral exploitation of the valley and surrounding desert regions, the early development of an independent writing system, the organization of collective construction and agricultural projects, trade with surrounding regions, and a military intended to defeat foreign enemies and assert Egyptian dominance. Motivating and organizing these activities was a bureaucracy of elite scribes, religious leaders, and administrators under the control of a pharaoh, who ensured the cooperation and unity of the Egyptian people in the context of an elaborate system of religious beliefs.

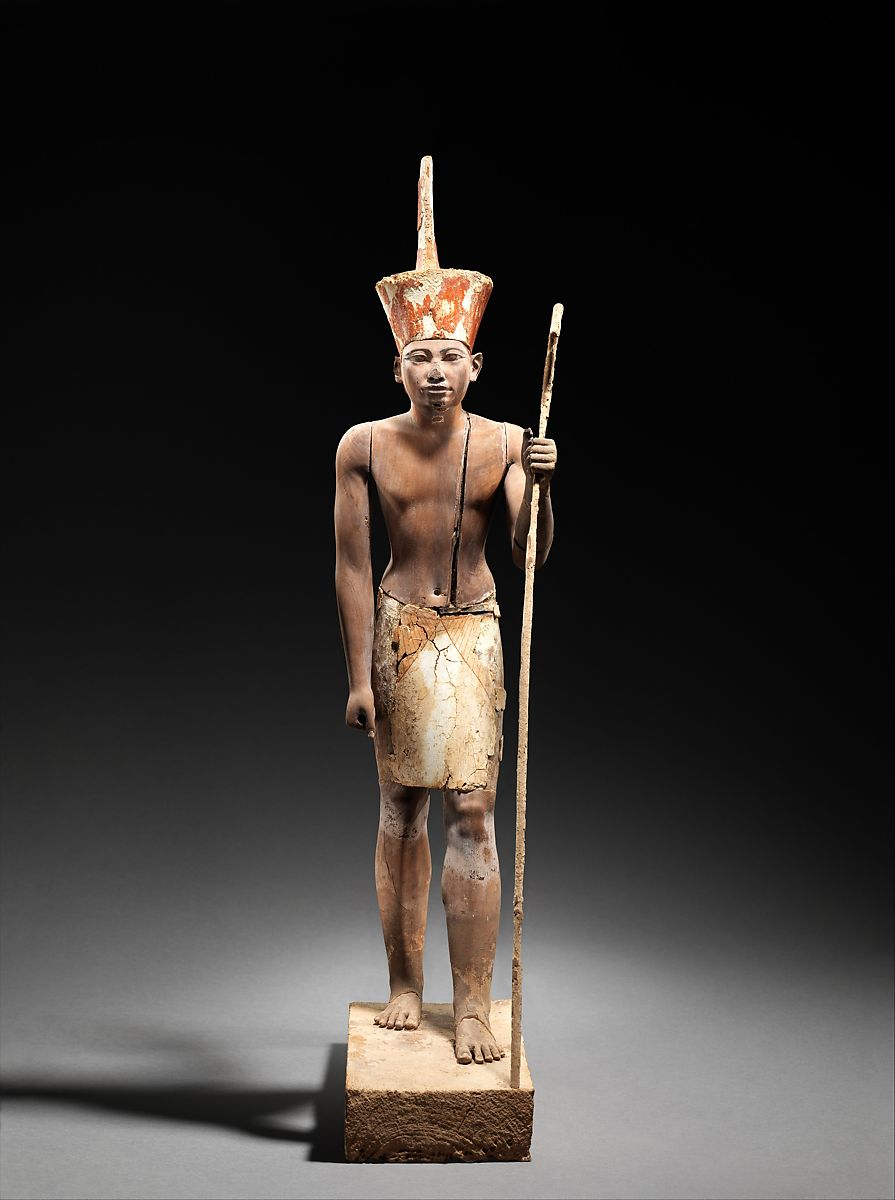
A figure wearing the red crown of Lower Egypt, most probably Amenemhat II or Senwosret II

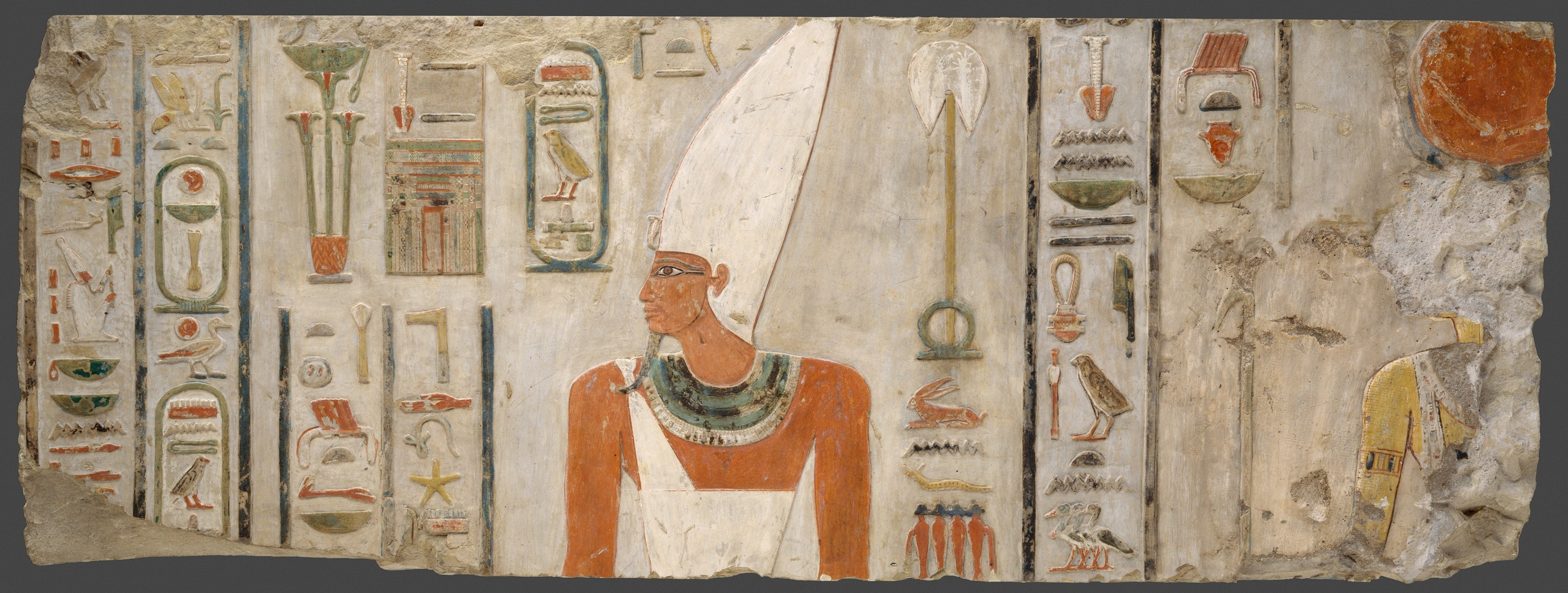
A painted relief depicting pharaoh Mentuhotep II, from his mortuary temple at Deir el-Bahari

The many achievements of the ancient Egyptians include the quarrying, surveying and construction techniques that supported the building of monumental pyramids, temples, and obelisks; a system of mathematics, a practical and effective system of medicine, irrigation systems and agricultural production techniques, the first known planked boats, Egyptian faience and glass technology, new forms of literature, and the earliest known peace treaty, made with the Hittites.

Ancient Egypt has left a lasting legacy. Its art and architecture were widely copied, and its antiquities carried off to far corners of the world. Its monumental ruins have inspired the imaginations of travelers and writers for centuries. A new-found respect for antiquities and excavations in the early modern period by Europeans and Egyptians led to the scientific investigation of Egyptian civilization and a greater appreciation of its cultural legacy.

=== Sudan ===
==== Kerma ====
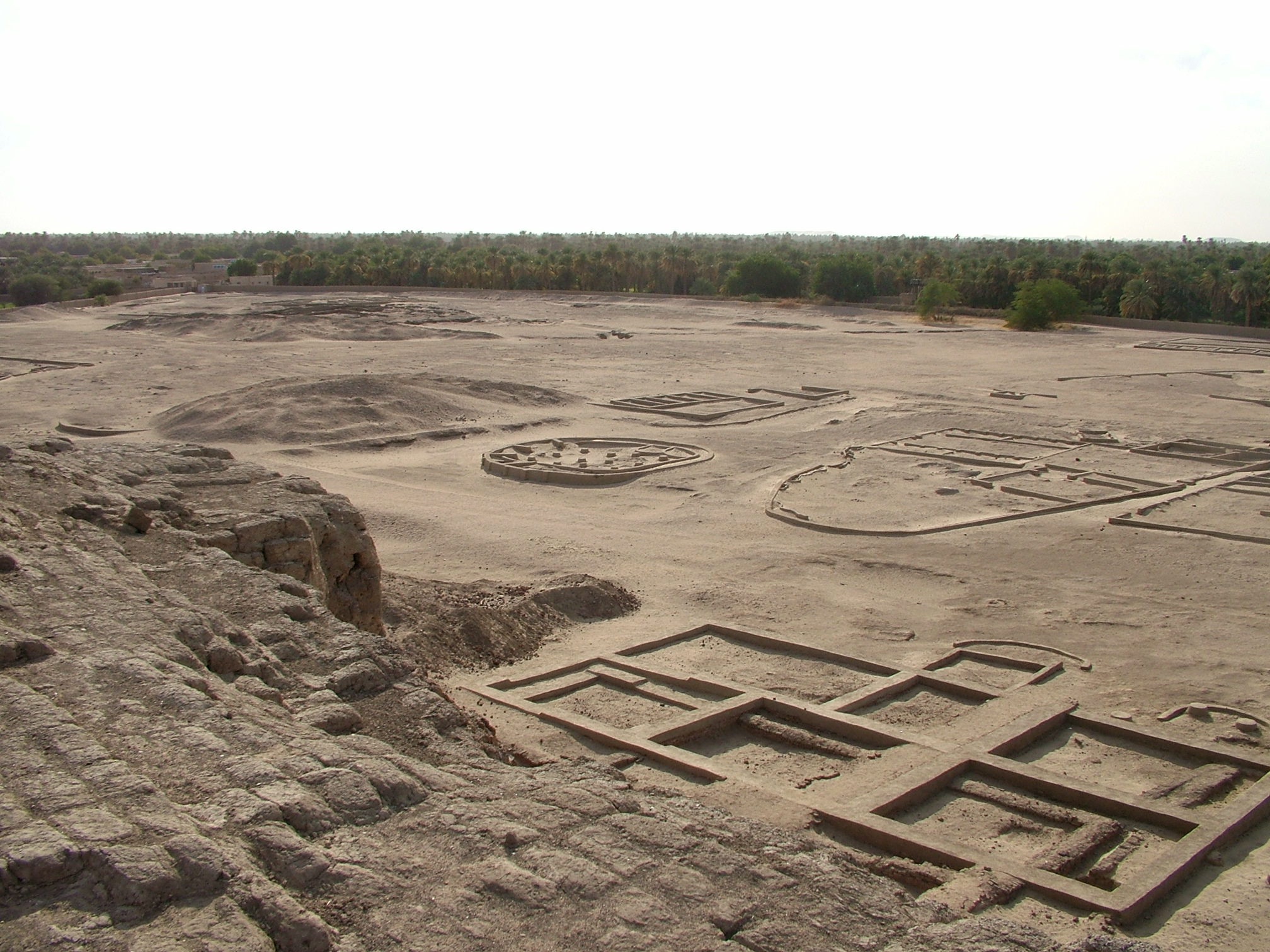
City of Kerma

Kerma was a civilization based in Upper Nubia and centered in Kerma, Sudan from c. 2500 BC to c. 1500 BC. The kingdom was known as Hkꜣr in Egyptian texts from the Middle Kingdom period. The largest tombs at Kerma measured nearly 300 feet in diameter. Kerma's army was mostly built around archers. The city of Kerma also had workshops specializing metal and faience. The rulers of Kerma initially sought an alliance with the Hyksos during the Second Intermediate Period in order to crush Egyptian rule, but the rise of the New Kingdom of Egypt saw Egypt conquer Kerma in c. 1500 BC.

==== Kush ====
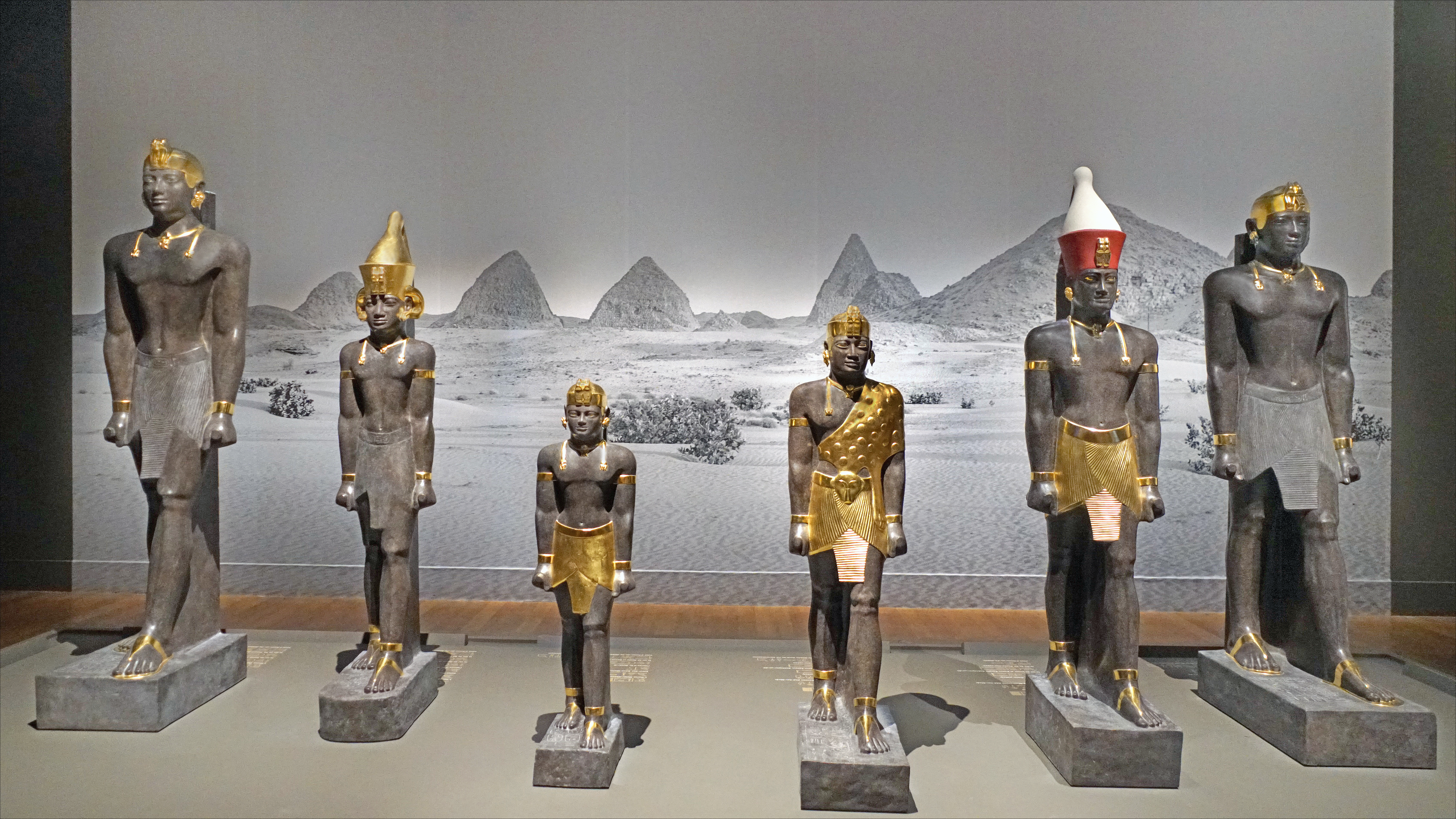
Louvre Museum reconstructions of statues of Kushite kings.

Kush was a Nubian kingdom that emerged following the decline of the New Kingdom of Egypt in c. 1070 BC. Kush was initially centered in Napata until 542 BC when the capital moved to Meroe. At its height, the kingdom conquered Egypt in the 8th century BC and ruled as the Twenty-fifth Dynasty of Egypt until 656 BC when the Kushites were driven out by the Assyrian conquest of Egypt. Kush would remain independent long after Egypt had been conquered by a series of foreign rulers (i.e. the Achaemenids, Greeks and Romans from 525 BC onwards) and ultimately lasted until c. 350 AD when Meroe was sacked by the Kingdom of Aksum.

Kush was more 'Egyptianized' compared to the earlier Kerma kingdom due to Egyptian rule of Nubia in the five centuries before Kush's independence. Kushite monarchs took Egyptian titles and were buried in pyramids. Egyptian hieroglyphs were also used, though the Meroitic script was also used beginning in c. 300 BC.

Ancient Nubians pioneered early antibiotics and established a system of geometrics which served as the basis for initial sunclocks. Nubians also exercised a trigonometric methodology comparable to their Egyptian counterparts.

==== Nobatia ====
Nobatia was located in Lower Nubia and first emerged as a kingdom in c. 400 AD. Initially Nobatia followed the cult of Isis but converted to Christianity in 543. Nobatia was annexed by Makuria in the early 8th century.

==== Makuria ====
Makuria was a Nubian kingdom that was based in Dongola and lasted from the 5th to the 16th centuries.

==== Alodia ====
Alodia was a Nubian kingdom located in what is now central and southern Sudan, which lasted from the 6th to the early 16th century.

==== Funj Sultanate ====
The Funj Sultanate was founded in 1504 and at its peak ruled over an area covering parts of modern-day Sudan, Eritrea and Ethiopia.

== See also ==
- Cradle of humanity
- Cradle of civilization
- List of kingdoms in Africa throughout history

== Sources ==
- Charron, Alain (1990), "L'époque thinite", L'Égypte des millénaires obscures, Paris, pp. 77–97.
- Robins, Gay (2008). The Art of Ancient Egypt (revised ed.). Harvard University Press. ISBN 978-0-674-03065-7.
- Stevenson, Alice (2015). The Petrie Museum of Egyptian Archaeology: Characters and Collections. London: UCLPress. ISBN 978-1-910634-04-2.

Open access pdf download.

- Trope, Betsy Teasley; Quirke, Stephen; Lacovara, Peter (2005), Excavating Egypt: great discoveries from the Petrie Museum of Egyptian Archaeology, University College, London, Atlanta: Michael C. Carlos Museum, Emory University.
- Wilkinson, TAH (1999), Early Dynastic Egypt, London; New York: Routledge.
