= 2010 World Junior Championships in Athletics – Men's 10,000 metres =

The men's 10,000 metres at the 2010 World Junior Championships in Athletics was held at the Moncton 2010 Stadium on 20 July. A field of 20 athletes from 14 countries competed.

== Medalists ==
Gold	Silver	Bronze
Dennis Chepkongin Masai; Kenya	Gebretsadik Abraha; Ethiopia	Paul Kipchumba Lonyangata; Kenya

== Records ==
Prior to the competition, the existing world junior and championship records were as follows.

	Name	Nationality	Time	Location	Date
World junior record	Samuel Wanjiru	Kenya	26:41.75	Brussels	August 26, 2005
Championship record	Josphat Bett	Kenya	27:30.85	Bydgoszcz	July 9, 2008

No new records were established during the competition.

== Results ==
20 July

Rank	Name	Nationality	Time	Notes
1st place, gold medalist(s)	Dennis Chepkongin Masai	Kenya	27:53.88	WJL
2nd place, silver medalist(s)	Gebretsadik Abraha	Ethiopia	28:03.45	PB
3rd place, bronze medalist(s)	Paul Kipchumba Lonyangata	Kenya	28:14.55	PB
4	Mohammed Ahmed	Canada	29:11.75	
5	Aaron Pulford	New Zealand	29:14.23	NJR
6	Parker Stinson	United States	29:32.23	PB
7	Suresh Kumar	India	29:40.07	
8	Suguru Osako	Japan	29:40.14	
9	Fuminori Shikata	Japan	29:47.87	
10	Joseph Chebet	Uganda	29:56.53	SB
11	Gabriel Navarro	Spain	29:57.78	PB
12	Mohammed Merbouhi	Algeria	30:06.23	PB
13	Andrew Nixon	Canada	30:35.43	
14	Nicolae Soare	Romania	30:37.23	PB
15	Mansour Haraoui	Algeria	30:54.84	
16	Graham Bazell	United States	30:59.57	
17	Indalow Takala	Israel	31:25.38	
	Edwin Chebii Kimurer	Bahrain		DNF
	Debebe Woldesenbet	Ethiopia		DNF
	José Costa	Portugal		DNF

Key: DNF = Did not finish, NJR = National junior record, PB = Personal best, SB = Seasonal best, WJL = World junior leading

== Participation ==
According to an unofficial count, 20 athletes from 14 countries participated in the event.

- Algeria (2)
- Bahrain (1)
- Canada (2)
- Ethiopia (2)
- India (1)
- Israel (1)
- Japan (2)
- Kenya (2)
- New Zealand (1)
- Portugal (1)
- Romania (1)
- Spain (1)
- Uganda (1)
- United States (2)
