= Athletics at the 2017 Summer Universiade – Men's 5000 metres =

The men's 5000 metres event at the 2017 Summer Universiade was held on 26 and 28 August at the Taipei Municipal Stadium.

== Medalists ==
| Gold | Silver | Bronze |
|---|---|---|
| François Barrer; France | Jonathan Davies; Great Britain | Andreas Vojta; Austria |

== Results ==
=== Heats ===
Qualification: First 5 in each heat (Q) and next 5 fastest (q) qualified for the semifinals.

| Rank | Heat | Name | Nationality | Time | Notes |
|---|---|---|---|---|---|
| 1 | 2 | Zemen Addis | Ethiopia | 14:23.12 | Q |
| 2 | 2 | Jonas Raess | Switzerland | 14:24.45 | Q |
| 3 | 2 | Matthew Bergin | Ireland | 14:25.10 | Q |
| 4 | 2 | Jonathan Davies | Great Britain | 14:25.43 | Q |
| 5 | 2 | François Barrer | France | 14:26.02 | Q |
| 6 | 2 | Simon Debognies | Belgium | 14:28.54 | q |
| 7 | 2 | Andreas Vojta | Austria | 14:29.78 | q |
| 8 | 2 | Mike Foppen | Netherlands | 14:30.22 | q |
| 9 | 2 | Thijs Nijhuis | Denmark | 14:30.81 | q |
| 10 | 1 | Nicolae Soare | Romania | 14:33.08 | Q |
| 11 | 1 | Sadic Bahati | Uganda | 14:33.65 | Q |
| 12 | 1 | Jeromy Andreas | South Africa | 14:34.18 | Q |
| 13 | 1 | Ramazan Özdemir | Turkey | 14:34.54 | Q |
| 14 | 1 | Brian Barraza | United States | 14:34.87 | Q |
| 15 | 1 | Kisan Tadvi | India | 14:35.83 | q, PB |
| 16 | 1 | Simas Bertašius | Lithuania | 14:39.41 | |
| 17 | 2 | Jeremiah Motsau | South Africa | 14:44.23 | PB |
| 18 | 1 | Ross Proudfoot | Canada | 14:45.75 | |
| 19 | 2 | Peter Ďurec | Slovakia | 14:51.36 | |
| 20 | 1 | Fernando Martínez | Mexico | 14:52.65 | |
| 21 | 1 | Kasper Skov | Denmark | 15:07.73 | |
| 22 | 2 | José Juan Esparza | Mexico | 15:10.22 | |
| 23 | 1 | Wang Hao | China | 15:29.05 | |
| 24 | 1 | Nawasinghe Mudiyanselage | Sri Lanka | 15:29.70 | SB |
| 25 | 1 | Boldoo Odbayar | Mongolia | 15:31.53 | |
| 26 | 1 | Aimen Hami | Algeria | 15:34.82 | |
| 27 | 2 | Victor Leon | Colombia | 15:49.76 | |
| 28 | 2 | Liu Tao | China | 15:50.70 | |
| 29 | 2 | Ayuob Al-Rashdi | Oman | 16:48.71 | |
| 30 | 1 | Siyambango Siyoto | Zambia | 16:55.74 | |
| 31 | 1 | Mahmood Al-Jashemi | Oman | 16:56.11 | |
| | 1 | Lloyd Prado | Philippines | DNS | |
| | 2 | Takieddine Hedeilli | Algeria | DNS | |
| | 2 | John Kateregga | Uganda | DNS | |
| | 2 | Kazuya Shiojiri | Japan | DNS | |

=== Final ===
| Rank | Name | Nationality | Time | Notes |
|---|---|---|---|---|
| 1st place, gold medalist(s) | François Barrer | France | 14:00.86 | |
| 2nd place, silver medalist(s) | Jonathan Davies | Great Britain | 14:02.46 | |
| 3rd place, bronze medalist(s) | Andreas Vojta | Austria | 14:02.65 | |
| 4 | Nicolae Soare | Romania | 14:03.12 | PB |
| 5 | Simon Debognies | Belgium | 14:05.39 | |
| 6 | Jeromy Andreas | South Africa | 14:06.24 | |
| 7 | Ramazan Özdemir | Turkey | 14:08.55 | |
| 8 | Jonas Raess | Switzerland | 14:08.99 | |
| 9 | Sadic Bahati | Uganda | 14:10.38 | PB |
| 10 | Matthew Bergin | Ireland | 14:11.54 | |
| 11 | Brian Barraza | United States | 14:19.47 | |
| 12 | Zemen Addis | Ethiopia | 14:22.54 | |
| 13 | Kisan Tadvi | India | 14:23.95 | PB |
| 14 | Mike Foppen | Netherlands | 14:40.91 | |
| 15 | Thijs Nijhuis | Denmark | 14:58.34 | |
