= 2018 European Athletics Championships – Men's 10,000 metres =

Men's 10,000 metres at the 2018 European Athletics Championships
- Venue: Olympic Stadium
- Location: Berlin
- Dates: 7 August (final)
- Competitors: 32 from 18 nations
- Winning time: 28:11.22

Medalists
| gold medal | Morhad Amdouni | France |
| silver medal | Bashir Abdi | Belgium |
| bronze medal | Yemaneberhan Crippa | Italy |

The Men's 10,000 metres at the 2018 European Athletics Championships took place at the Olympic Stadium on 7 August.

== Records ==
Standing records prior to the 2018 European Athletics Championships
| World record | Kenenisa Bekele (ETH) | 26:17.53 | Brussels, Belgium | 26 August 2005 |
| European record | Mo Farah (GBR) | 26:46.57 | Eugene, United States | 3 June 2011 |
| Championship record | Martti Vainio (FIN) | 27:30.99 | Prague, Czechoslovakia | 29 August 1978 |
| World Leading | Joshua Cheptegei (UGA) | 27:19.62 | Gold Coast, Australia | 13 April 2018 |
| European Leading | Richard Ringer (GER) | 27:36.52 | London, Great Britain | 19 May 2018 |

== Schedule ==
| Date | Time | Round |
|---|---|---|
| 7 August 2018 | 20:20 | Final |

All times are local times (UTC+2)

== Results ==
| Place | Athlete | Nation | Time | Notes |
|---|---|---|---|---|
| 1st place, gold medalist(s) | Morhad Amdouni | France | 28:11.22 | |
| 2nd place, silver medalist(s) | Bashir Abdi | Belgium | 28:11.76 | |
| 3rd place, bronze medalist(s) | Yemaneberhan Crippa | Italy | 28:12.15 | |
| 4 | Adel Mechaal | Spain | 28:13.78 | |
| 5 | Andy Vernon | Great Britain | 28:16.90 | |
| 6 | Soufiane Bouchikhi | Belgium | 28:19.04 | |
| 7 | Julien Wanders | Switzerland | 28:22.02 | |
| 8 | Florian Carvalho | France | 28:29.78 | |
| 9 | Juan Antonio Pérez | Spain | 28:31.31 | SB |
| 10 | Kaan Kigen Özbilen | Turkey | 28:32.93 | |
| 11 | Chris Thompson | Great Britain | 28:33.12 | |
| 12 | Daniel Mateo | Spain | 28:44.43 | |
| 13 | Lorenzo Dini | Italy | 28:45.04 | |
| 14 | Alexander Yee | Great Britain | 28:58.86 | |
| 15 | Simon Debognies | Belgium | 29:00.98 | |
| 16 | Amanal Petros | Germany | 29:01.19 | |
| 17 | Vasyl Koval | Ukraine | 29:07.23 | |
| 18 | Arttu Vattulainen | Finland | 29:12.02 | |
| 19 | Nicolae Soare | Romania | 29:13.82 | |
| 20 | Yevgeny Rybakov | Authorised Neutral Athletes | 29:15.30 | |
| 21 | Dmytro Siruk | Ukraine | 29:19.55 | |
| 22 | Benjamin Rainero de Haan | Netherlands | 29:38.31 | |
| 23 | Stephen Scullion | Ireland | 29:46.87 | |
| 24 | Sebastian Hendel | Germany | 29:53.45 | |
| 25 | Girmaw Amare | Israel | 30:11.91 | |
| 26 | François Barrer | France | 30:22.91 | |
| 27 | Marius Øyre Vedvik | Norway | 30:46.59 | |
| | Samuel Barata | Portugal | DNF | |
| | Richard Ringer | Germany | DNF | |
| | Aras Kaya | Turkey | DNF | |
| | Jakub Zemaník | Czech Republic | DNF | |
| | Polat Kemboi Arıkan | Turkey | DNF | |
