= 2013 European Athletics U23 Championships – Men's 10,000 metres =

Event at the 2013 European Athletics U23 Championships

The Men's 10,000 metres event at the 2013 European Athletics U23 Championships was held in Tampere, Finland, at Ratina Stadium on 11 July.

== Medalists ==
Gold	Gabriel Navarro; Spain
Silver	Nicolae Alexandru Soare; Romania
Bronze	Abdi Hakin Ulad; Denmark

== Results ==
=== Final ===
11 July 2013

Rank	Name	Nationality	Time	Notes
1st place, gold medalist(s)	Gabriel Navarro	Spain	29:43.22	
2nd place, silver medalist(s)	Nicolae Alexandru Soare	Romania	29:43.76	
3rd place, bronze medalist(s)	Abdi Hakin Ulad	Denmark	29:44.78	SB
4	Shane Quinn	Ireland	29:49.43	PB
5	Yuriy Vykhopen	Ukraine	29:52.94	
6	Igor Maksimov	Russia	29:53.05	
7	Dmytro Siruk	Ukraine	29:53.07	
8	Mats Lunders	Belgium	29:59.37	
9	Tom Gröschel	Germany	29:59.61	
10	Thijs Nijhuis	Denmark	30:03.20	
11	Sándor Szabó	Hungary	30:17.37	PB
12	Hendrik Pfeiffer	Germany	30:19.55	
13	José Pedro Costa	Portugal	30:19.65	
14	Yehor Zhukov	Ukraine	30:35.73	
15	Jasmin Ljajić	Serbia	30:36.11	
16	Şeref Dirli	Turkey	30:42.89	
17	Maru Teferi	Israel	30:50.54	
18	Arttu Vattulainen	Finland	31:10.56	
19	Emmanuel Lejeune	Belgium	32:15.88	
	Marius Øyre Vedvik	Norway	DNF	

Intermediate times:
1000m: 2:55.65 Marius Øyre Vedvik Norway
2000m: 5:57.21 Marius Øyre Vedvik Norway
3000m: 9:04.74 Marius Øyre Vedvik Norway
4000m: 12:06.21 Mats Lunders Belgium
5000m: 15:02.01 Gabriel Navarro Spain
6000m: 18:08.61 Dmytro Siruk Ukraine
7000m: 21:11.84 Thijs Nijhuis Denmark
8000m: 24:09.82 Igor Maksimov Russia
9000m: 27:04.37 Gabriel Navarro Spain

== Participation ==
According to an unofficial count, 20 athletes from 15 countries participated in the event.

- Belgium (2)
- Denmark (2)
- Finland (1)
- Germany (2)
- Hungary (1)
- Ireland (1)
- Israel (1)
- Norway (1)
- Portugal (1)
- Romania (1)
- Russia (1)
- Serbia (1)
- Spain (1)
- Turkey (1)
- Ukraine (3)
