= Athletics at the 2015 Summer Universiade – Men's 5000 metres =

The men's 5000 metres event at the 2015 Summer Universiade was held on 10 and 12 July at the Gwangju Universiade Main Stadium.

The winning margin was a huge 17.78 seconds which as of 2024 is the only time the men's 5,000 metres has been won at these games by more than 11 seconds.

== Medalists ==
Gold	Silver	Bronze
Hayle Ibrahimov; Azerbaijan	Zouhair Talbi; Morocco	Rinas Akhmadeev; Russia

== Results ==
=== Heats ===
Qualification: First 5 in each heat (Q) and next 5 fastest (q) qualified for the semifinals.

Rank	Heat	Name	Nationality	Time	Notes
1	1	Hayle Ibrahimov	Azerbaijan	13:51.40	Q
2	1	Hironori Tsuetaki	Japan	14:01.40	Q
3	1	Mohamed Agourram	Morocco	14:06.73	Q, SB
4	1	Ross Proudfoot	Canada	14:09.00	Q
5	1	Pol Mellina	Luxembourg	14:14.86	Q
6	2	Keisuke Nakatani	Japan	14:16.60	Q
7	2	Rinas Akhmadeev	Russia	14:17.31	Q
8	2	Zouhair Talbi	Morocco	14:17.76	Q
9	2	Thijs Nijhuis	Denmark	14:18.70	Q
10	2	Kevin Batt	Ireland	14:19.11	Q
11	2	Daniel Estrada	Chile	14:19.29	q
12	2	Valentin Paul Pfeil	Austria	14:23.56	q, SB
13	1	Andrey Minzhulin	Russia	14:24.88	q
14	2	Anton Danielsson	Sweden	14:26.07	q
15	1	Stewart McSweyn	Australia	14:28.33	q
16	2	Daniel Balchin	New Zealand	14:32.59	
17	1	Anders Lindahl	Finland	14:37.46	SB
18	1	Hans Kristian Fløystad	Norway	14:42.69	
19	1	Rok Puhar	Slovenia	14:46.45	
20	1	Jeppe Harboe	Denmark	14:52.83	
21	1	Awwad Al-Sharafat	Jordan	15:03.52	PB
22	1	Walter Suarez	Venezuela	15:04.21	
23	2	Noah Schutte	Netherlands	15:11.78	
24	2	Simiso Nzima	Swaziland	15:51.34	
25	2	Phan Sopheak	Cambodia	16:56.26	PB
26	1	Al Zeer Al-Siyabi	Oman	17:34.21	
	1	Mark Lokwanamoi	Kenya	DNS	
	2	Ismael Mebale Me Nang	Gabon	DNS	
	2	William Wanjiku	Kenya	DNS	

=== Final ===
Official Video

Rank	Name	Nationality	Time	Notes
1st place, gold medalist(s)	Hayle Ibrahimov	Azerbaijan	13:44.28	
2nd place, silver medalist(s)	Zouhair Talbi	Morocco	14:02.06	
3rd place, bronze medalist(s)	Rinas Akhmadeev	Russia	14:05.88	
4	Thijs Nijhuis	Denmark	14:12.83	
5	Ross Proudfoot	Canada	14:13.30	
6	Hironori Tsuetaki	Japan	14:13.54	
7	Mohamed Agourram	Morocco	14:13.89	
8	Andrey Minzhulin	Russia	14:26.56	
9	Kevin Batt	Ireland	14:28.74	
10	Keisuke Nakatani	Japan	14:33.85	
11	Valentin Paul Pfeil	Austria	14:35.05	
12	Pol Mellina	Luxembourg	14:35.31	
13	Anton Danielsson	Sweden	14:36.37	
14	Stewart McSweyn	Australia	14:37.96	
15	Daniel Estrada	Chile	14:42.50	
