= Shogo Nakamura (runner) =

Japanese long-distance runner

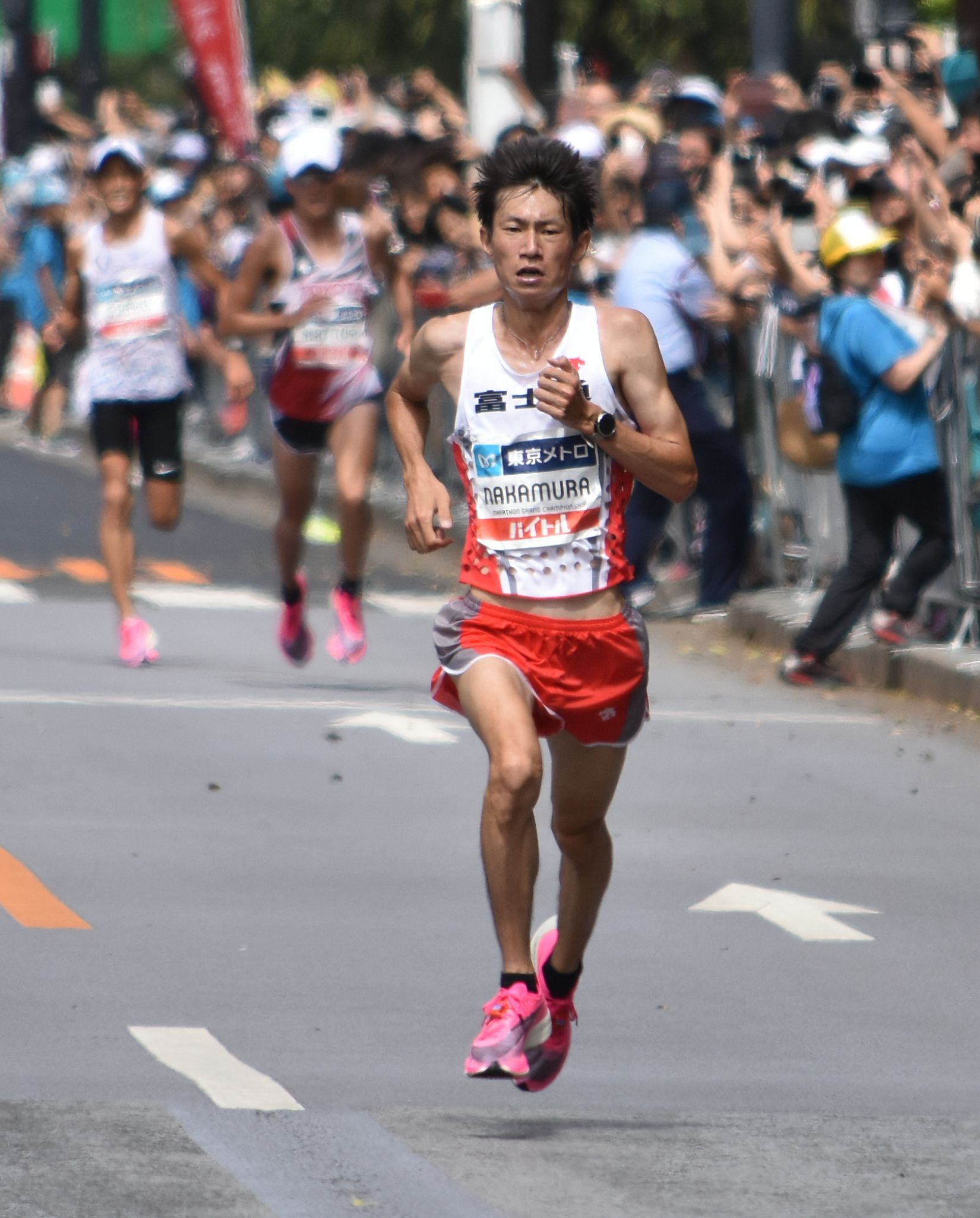
- Nakamura at the 2019 Marathon Grand Championship

Personal information
- Born: 16 September 1992 (age 33) Yokkaichi, Japan
- Height: 1.72 m (5 ft 8 in)
- Weight: 55 kg (121 lb)

Sport
- Sport: Athletics
- Events: 10000 metres; Half marathon; Marathon
- University team: Komazawa University
Medal record
Universiade
Bronze medal – third place	2013 Kazan	Half marathon

Shogo Nakamura (Japanese: 中村匠吾, romanized: Nakamura Shōgo; born 16 September 1992) is a Japanese long-distance runner.

He qualified for the marathon at the 2020 Summer Olympics by winning the 2019 Marathon Grand Championship with a time of 2:11:28, closely beating out Yuma Hattori and national record holder Suguru Osako.

== Personal bests ==
Outdoor

- 5000 metres – 13:38.93 (Osaka 2016)
- 10000 metres – 28:05.79 (Nobeoka 2013)
- Half marathon – 1:01:53 (Yamaguchi 2016)
- Marathon – 2:08:16 (Berlin 2018)
