= Athletics at the 2013 Summer Universiade – Men's half marathon =

The men's half marathon at the 2013 Summer Universiade was held on July 12, 2013.

== Medalists ==
=== Individual ===
Gold	Silver	Bronze
Sibabalwe Mzazi; South Africa	Stephen Mokoka; South Africa	Shogo Nakamura; Japan

=== Team ===
Gold	Silver	Bronze
South Africa; Sibabalwe Mzazi; Stephen Mokoka; Xolisane Zamkele	Japan; Shogo Nakamura; Hiroki Yamagishi; Shota Hattori; Toshikatsu Ebina; Yuta Shitara	Russia; Andrey Leyman; Anatoly Rybakov; Artem Aplachkin; Yuri Chechun; Yevgeniy Pishchalov

== Results ==
=== Individual standing ===
Rank	Name	Nationality	Time	Notes
1st place, gold medalist(s)	Sibabalwe Mzazi	South Africa	1:03:37	SB
2nd place, silver medalist(s)	Stephen Mokoka	South Africa	1:03:37	
3rd place, bronze medalist(s)	Shogo Nakamura	Japan	1:04:21	
4	Hiroki Yamagishi	Japan	1:04:41	
5	Shota Hattori	Japan	1:05:00	
6	Andrey Leyman	Russia	1:05:08	PB
7	Xolisane Zamkele	South Africa	1:05:38	
8	Toshikatsu Ebina	Japan	1:05:39	
9	Anatoly Rybakov	Russia	1:05:41	
10	Artem Aplachkin	Russia	1:05:49	
11	Tasama Moogas	Israel	1:05:50	
12	Yuri Chechun	Russia	1:06:09	
13	Hasan Pak	Turkey	1:06:15	
14	Yevgeniy Pishchalov	Russia	1:06:36	
15	Jānis Višķers	Latvia	1:07:09	
16	Cristopher Guajardo	Chile	1:07:44	
17	Kim Seong-ha	South Korea	1:08:14	
18	Jin Chao	China	1:08:17	
19	Muzaffer Bayram	Turkey	1:08:24	PB
20	Yuta Shitara	Japan	1:08:25	
21	Girmaw Amare	Israel	1:08:38	
22	Jiří Homoláč	Czech Republic	1:08:41	
23	Vedat Günen	Turkey	1:08:42	
24	Ren Longyun	China	1:08:43	
25	Daniel Estrada	Chile	1:08:52	PB
26	David Nilsson	Sweden	1:08:58	
27	Mehmet Çağlayan	Turkey	1:09:30	SB
28	Mikhail Krassilov	Kazakhstan	1:09:56	PB
29	Gantulga Dambadarjaa	Mongolia	1:09:56	
30	Amon Terer	Kenya	1:10:16	
31	Herbert Gidadui	Uganda	1:10:30	
32	Vít Pavlišta	Czech Republic	1:10:49	
33	Allan Makweta	Uganda	1:11:12	
34	Andreas Åhwall	Sweden	1:11:20	
35	Cho Yong-won	South Korea	1:11:30	
36	Benjamin Njia	Uganda	1:11:48	
37	Amos Kiprotich	Kenya	1:14:29	
38	Oumarou Nabara Barmou	Niger	1:15:40	
39	Marcel Berni	Switzerland	1:16:03	
40	Li Shaozhuang	China	1:18:01	
	Byambajav Tseveenravdan	Mongolia	DNF	
	José Luis Duarte	Mexico	DNF	
	Dieter Van Streels	Belgium	DNF	

=== Team standing ===
Rank	Team	Time	Notes
1st place, gold medalist(s)	South Africa	3:12:52	
2nd place, silver medalist(s)	Japan	3:14:02	
3rd place, bronze medalist(s)	Russia	3:16:38	
4	Turkey	3:23:21	
5	Uganda	3:33:30	
6	China	3:35:01	
