= Dejenee Regassa =

Ethiopian-Bahraini long-distance runner (born 1989)

Personal information
- Born: 18 April 1989 (age 37) Ethiopia
Medal record
Men's athletics
Representing Bahrain
Asian Championships
Gold medal – first place	2011 Kobe	5000 m

Dejenee Regassa Mootumaa (born 18 April 1989) is formerly an Ethiopian-born long-distance runner who competed internationally for Bahrain. For a time, he was the reigning Asian champion in the 5000 metres.

In his first major appearance outside of Ethiopia, he ran at the 2009 Frankfurt Marathon and finished 20th in a time of 2:15:30 hours. He transferred his eligibility to Bahrain at the end of 2009. He made his international debut at the 2010 IAAF World Cross Country Championships, coming 84th, and placed fourth in the 5000 metres at the 2010 Asian Games.

He was much improved in the 2011 season. He reached 28th place at the 2011 World Cross Country then claimed the Asian 5000 m title at the 2011 Asian Athletics Championships – Bahrain won all the long-distance races that year as a result. He ran a personal best of 13:24.27 minutes for the event at the 2011 Military World Games, finishing seventh, and represented Bahrain in the heats at the 2011 World Championships in Athletics. At the 2011 Pan Arab Games in December he tried out the 3000 metres steeplechase and came fourth in a time of 8:39.53 minutes. He won his first medal on grass the following March, as he was the runner-up at the Asian Championship meet and was part of a Bahraini podium sweep with Alemu Bekele and Bilisuma Shugi.
