= Soufiane Bouchikhi =

Belgian long-distance runner

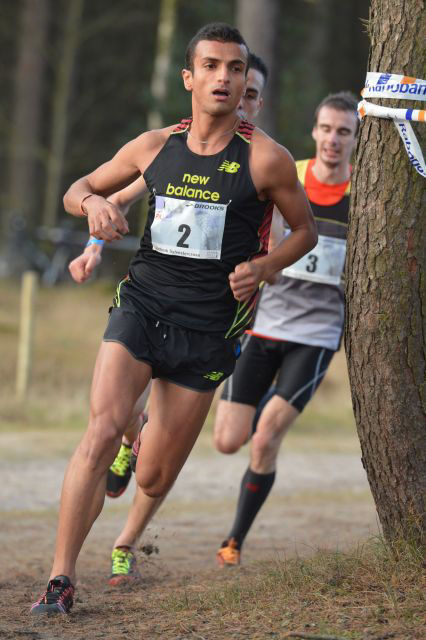
- Bouchikhi in 2014

Personal information
- Born: 22 March 1990 (age 36) Sint-Niklaas, East Flanders, Belgium
- Education: Eastern Kentucky University

Sport
- Sport: Athletics
- Events: 5000 m, 10,000 m
- College team: Eastern Kentucky Colonels
- Club: RFCL Athlétisme
- Coached by: Luk Verlaenen

Soufiane Bouchikhi (born 22 March 1990 in Sint-Niklaas) is a retired Belgian long-distance runner. He represented his country in the 5000 metres at the 2017 World Championships. At the 2019 World Championships in Doha he made the 10,000m final and finished 13th. In addition, he won the silver medal in the U23 category at the 2012 European Cross Country Championships.

Bouchikhi is currently serving a two-year competition ban set to end on 24 January 2026 due to an anti-doping violation ("Refusal and or Failure to Submit").

== International competitions ==
Year	Competition	Venue	Position	Event	Notes
Representing Belgium
2009	European Junior Championships	Novi Sad, Serbia	7th	10,000 m	31:46.38
2011	European U23 Championships	Ostrava, Czech Republic	16th	5000 m	14:32.71
2014	European Championships	Zürich, Switzerland	15th	10,000 m	14:17.43
2015	Universiade	Gwangju, South Korea	5th	10,000 m	29:24.21
2015	Universiade	Gwangju, South Korea	4th	Half marathon	1:06:04
2016	European Championships	Amsterdam, Netherlands	8th	10,000 m	29:03.74
2016	European Championships	Amsterdam, Netherlands	28th	Half marathon	1:05:31
2017	World Championships	London, United Kingdom	11th (h)	5000 m	13:28.64
2018	European Championships	Berlin, Germany	10th	5000 m	13:25.22
2018	European Championships	Berlin, Germany	6th	10,000 m	28:19.07
2019	World Championships	Doha, Qatar	13th	10,000 m	28:15.43

== Personal bests ==
Outdoor

- 1500 metres – 3:43.03 (Oordegem 2021)
- 3000 metres – 7:55.55 (Birmingham 2017)
- 5000 metres – 13:19.55 (Heusden-Zolder 2018)
- 10,000 metres – 27:41.20 (Palo Alto 2018)
- 10 kilometres – 28:16(Manchester 2021)
- 10 miles – 48:55 (Tilburg 2016)
- Half marathon – 1:02:59 (New

York 2019)

- Marathon - 2:12:39 (Dresden 2021)

Indoor

- One mile – 4:02.90 (Notre Dame 2012)
- 3000 metres – 7:53.99 (Seattle 2012)
- 5000 metres – 13:46.66 (Seattle 2012)
