= Athletics at the 2005 Summer Universiade – Men's 10,000 metres =

The men's 10,000 metres event at the 2005 Summer Universiade was held on 16 August in İzmir, Turkey.

== Results ==
Rank	Athlete	Nationality	Time	Notes
1st place, gold medalist(s)	Wilson Busienei	Uganda	28:27.57	
2nd place, silver medalist(s)	Fadil Mohamed	Morocco	28:31.86	PB
3rd place, bronze medalist(s)	Karim El Mabchour	Morocco	28:43.15	PB
4	Yuki Sato	Japan	28:43.46	
5	Hideaki Date	Japan	29:09.80	
6	Carles Castillejo	Spain	29:23.93	
7	Brahim Chettah	Algeria	29:30.34	PB
8	Slavko Petrović	Croatia	29:41.13	
9	Stephen Mokoka	South Africa	29:42.65	
10	Jonnatán Morales	Mexico	29:48.07	SB
11	Micah Tirop	Kenya	30:00.27	PB
12	Han Gang	China	30:07.33	
13	Francis Yiga	Uganda	30:12.77	PB
14	Jesús Antonio Núñez	Spain	30:14.81	
15	Sabri Kara	Turkey	30:20.18	SB
16	Thubalethu Phaku	South Africa	30:41.62	
17	Muğdat Öztürk	Turkey	30:52.78	
18	Marius Ionescu	Romania	31:08.11	
19	Joe McAlister	Ireland	31:25.39	
20	Leopold Gahungu	Rwanda	31:34.45	
21	Ferdinand Buzingo	Burundi	32:13.55	
	Pierre Joncheray	France	DNF	
	Gavin Thompson	Great Britain	DNF	
	Simon Ndirangu	Kenya	DNF	
	Reid Coolsaet	Canada	DNS	
	Takayuki Tagami	Japan	DNS	
	Zahi Siklawi	Libya	DNS	
