= Hiroki Yamagishi =

Japanese long-distance runner

Personal information
- Born: 6 September 1991 (age 34)

Sport
- Country: Japan
- Sport: Long-distance running

Hiroki Yamagishi (山岸 宏貴, Yamagishi Hiroki; born 6 September 1991) is a Japanese long-distance runner. In 2019, he competed in the men's marathon at the 2019 World Athletics Championships held in Doha, Qatar. He finished in 25th place.

In 2013, he competed in the men's half marathon event at the 2013 Summer Universiade held in Kazan, Russia. He finished in 4th place and he won the silver medal in the team event.

In 2018, he finished in 17th place in the 2018 Tokyo Marathon in Tokyo, Japan.
