= Tom Farrell (long-distance runner) =

English long-distance runner

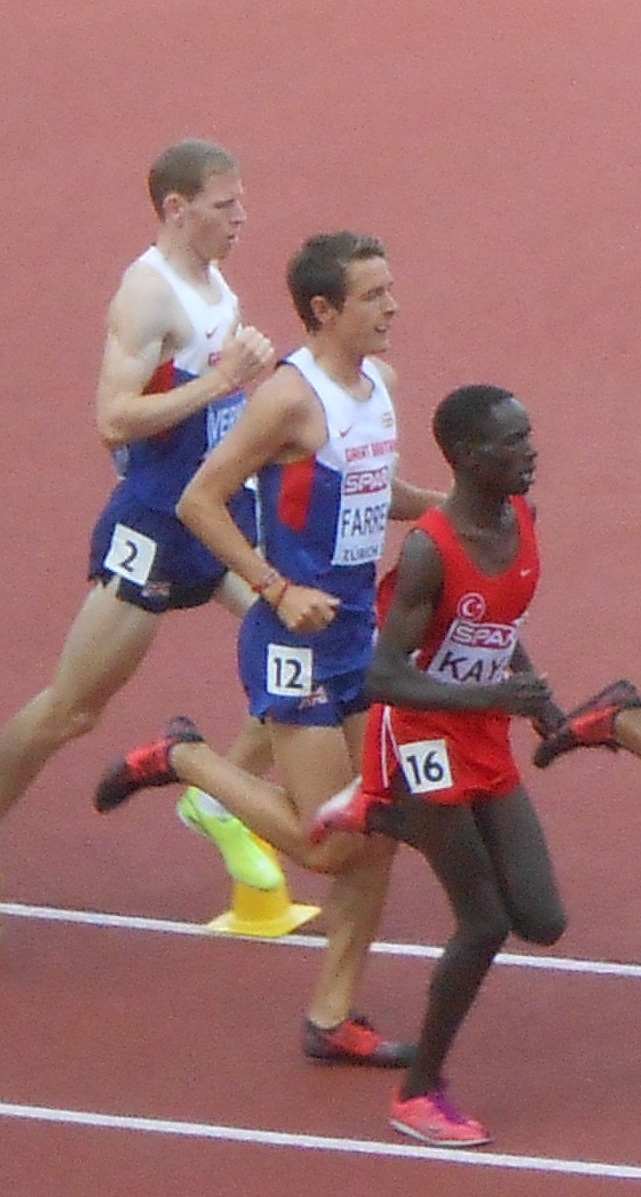
- Tom Farrell (centre) at the 2014 European Athletics Championships

Personal information
- Born: 23 March 1991 (age 35) Carlisle, England
- Education: Oklahoma State University
- Height: 179 cm (5 ft 10 in)
- Weight: 63 kg (139 lb)

Sport
- Sport: Track and field
- Event: 5000 metres
- Club: Border Harriers
- Coached by: Dave Smith (2010-2014); Mark Rowland (2014–)

Thomas William Farrell (born 23 March 1991) is an English long-distance runner who competed at the 2016 Summer Olympics.

== Biography ==
Farrell represented England at the 2014 Commonwealth Games in Glasgow.

Farrell was twice British 5000 metres champion after winning the British Athletics Championships in 2014 and 2015.

He represented his country at the 2015 World Championships in Athletics and 2016 IAAF World Indoor Championships. Both his parents are former athletes. His father David was a steeplechaser and his mother Jennifer Little was a high jumper.

At the 2016 Olympic Games in Rio, he represented Great Britain in the 5,000 metres event.

== Competition record ==
Year	Competition	Venue	Position	Event	Notes
Representing Great Britain and England
2013	European U23 Championships	Tampere, Finland	2nd	5000 m	14:19.94
2014	Commonwealth Games	Glasgow, United Kingdom	7th	5000 m	13:23.96
2014	European Championships	Zürich, Switzerland	12th	5000 m	14:15.93
2015	World Championships	Beijing, China	15th	5000 m	14:08.87
2016	World Indoor Championships	Portland, United States	15th (h)	3000 m	7:59.77
2016	Olympic Games	Rio de Janeiro, Brazil	40th (h)	5000 m	14:11.65

== Personal bests ==
Outdoor

- 1500 metres – 3:37.90 (Glasgow 2014)
- 5000 metres – 13:10.48 (Heusden-Zolder 2015)

Indoor

- 1500 metres – 3:42.19 (Glasgow 2016)
- One mile – 3:58.20 (Fayetteville 2013)
- 3000 metres – 7:42.47 (Portland 2016)
- 5000 metres – 13:42.17 (New York 2015)
