= Yuta Shitara =

Japanese long-distance runner

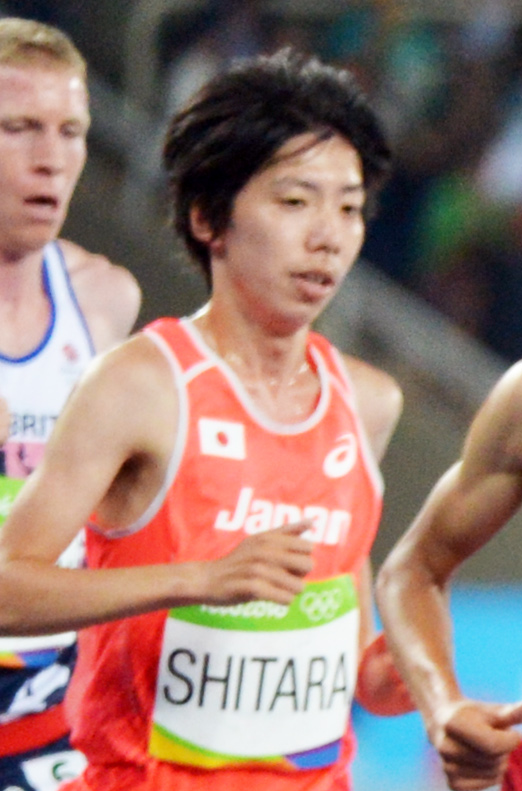
- Shitara at the 2016 Olympics

Personal information
- Born: 18 December 1991 (age 34)
- Height: 1.74 m (5 ft 9 in)
- Weight: 48 kg (106 lb)

Sport
- Sport: Track and field
- Events: 5000 metres, 10,000 metres, Marathon

Yuta Shitara (設楽 悠太, Shitara Yūta; born 18 December 1991) is a Japanese long-distance runner. He competed in the 10,000 metres at the 2015 World Championships in Beijing finishing 23rd.

Yuta Shitara competed in the 2018 edition of the Tokyo Marathon, where he, after falling off the lead pack at 32 km to seventh place, regrouped and advanced position to take second overall, at 2:06:11, which was a new Japanese National Record at the time. In doing so, he also won a prize of 100 million yen (roughly $936,000) that was offered to any Japanese man who could run a new national record.

== International competitions ==
Year	Competition	Venue	Position	Event	Notes
Representing Japan
2013	Universiade	Kazan, Russia	20th	Half marathon	1:08:25
2015	World Championships	Beijing, China	23rd	10,000 m	30:08.35
2016	Olympic Games	Rio de Janeiro, Brazil	29th	10,000 m	28:55.23

== Personal bests ==
Outdoor

- 5000 metres – 13:34.68 (Hiroshima 2015)
- 10,000 metres – 27:41.97 (Tokyo 2017)
- 20 kilometres – 58:33 (New York 2012)
- Half marathon – 1:00:17 (Ústí nad Labem Half Marathon 2017)
- Marathon – 2:06:11 (Tokyo 2018)
