= Thijs Nijhuis =

Danish long-distance runner

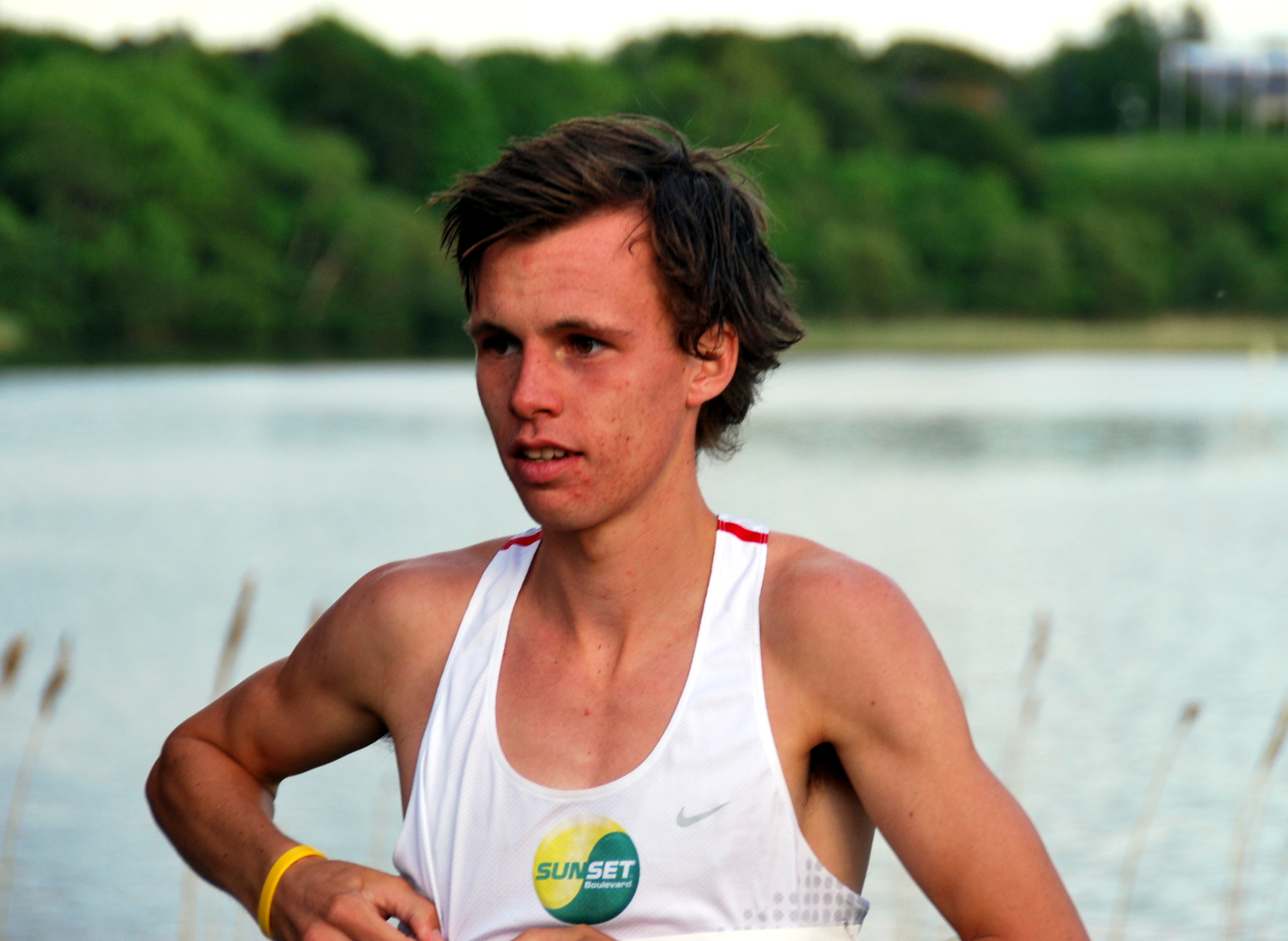
Thijs Nijhuis (2012)

Thijs Matthias Nijhuis (born 20 September 1992, in the Netherlands) is a Danish long-distance runner.

He finished tenth at the 2013 European U23 Championships (10,000 m), fourth at the 2015 Summer Universiade (5000 m), fifteenth at the 2017 Summer Universiade (5000 m) and tenth at the 2017 Summer Universiade (10,000 m). He also competed at the 2015 European Indoor Championships (3000 m) without reaching the final.

In 2019 he competed in the senior men's race at the 2019 IAAF World Cross Country Championships held in Aarhus, Denmark. He finished in 116th place. In 2019, he also competed in the men's marathon at the 2019 World Athletics Championships held in Doha, Qatar. He finished in 31st place. In 2020, he competed in the men's race at the 2020 World Athletics Half Marathon Championships held in Gdynia, Poland. At the Seville Marathon 2020 he finished in time 2:10:57, qualifying him for the 2020 Summer Olympics.
