= Jonathan Davies (athlete) =

English athlete (born 1994)

Personal information
- Born: 28 October 1994 (age 30)
- Education: University of Birmingham

Sport
- Sport: Athletics
- Event(s): 1500 m, 5000 m
- Club: Reading Athletic Club
- Coached by: Rob McKim (–2017)

Jonathan Stuart Davies (born 28 October 1994) is an English middle- and long-distance runner. He represented Great Britain at the 2018 World Indoor Championships without advancing from the first round. In addition, he won two medals at the 2017 Summer Universiade. Davies is also a talented cross country runner, winning the under 23 race at the 2015 European Cross Country Championships and the senior mixed relay at the 2019 European Cross Country Championships. In 2020 JD took his maiden British title when winning the 3000m at the 2020 British Indoor Athletics Championships.

== International competitions ==
Year	Competition	Venue	Position	Event	Notes
Representing Great Britain
2013	European Junior Championships	Rieti, Italy	3rd	5000 m	14:36.62
2015	European U23 Championships	Tallinn, Estonia	6th	5000 m	13:58.44
2016	European Championships	Amsterdam, Netherlands	15th	5000 m	14:04.13
2017	Universiade	Taipei, Taiwan	3rd	1500 m	3:43.99
2017	Universiade	Taipei, Taiwan	2nd	5000 m	14:02.46
2018	World Indoor Championships	Birmingham, United Kingdom	16th (h)	3000 m	8:21.73

== Personal bests ==
Outdoor

- 800 metres – 1:48.94 (Stretford 2017)
- 1500 metres – 3:39.00 (Watford 2017)
- One mile – 3:59.36 (Stirling 2020)
- 3000 metres – 7:45.75 (Bromley 2020)
- 5000 metres – 13:23.94 (Oordegem (BEL) 29 MAY 2016)
- 10,000 metres – 29:24.07 (Parliament Hill 2015)
- 3000 metres steeplechase – 9:17.46 (Chelmsford 2015)
- 5 kilometres – 13:44 (Armagh 2020)
- 10 kilometres – 29:18 (Manchester 2015)

Indoor

- 1500 metres – 3:47.26 (Sheffield 2018)
- 3000 metres – 7:50.18 (Boston 2018)
- 5000 metres – 13:58.04 (Birmingham 2017)
