= Gladwin Mzazi =

South African long-distance runner

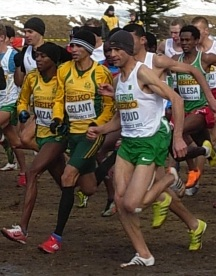
- Gladwin Mzazi (left) at the 2013 IAAF World Cross Country Championships

Personal information
- Born: 28 August 1988 (age 37)
- Education: Tshwane University of Technology
- Height: 1.62 m (5 ft 4 in)
- Weight: 50 kg (110 lb)

Sport
- Sport: Track and field
- Event(s): 10,000 metres, half marathon

Sibabalwe Gladwin Mzazi (born 28 August 1988) is a South African athlete competing in the long-distance running events. He competed at five consecutive Summer Universiades winning gold medals in 2009 and 2013.

== Competition record ==
Year	Competition	Venue	Position	Event	Notes
Representing South Africa
2007	Universiade	Bangkok, Thailand	14th	10,000 m	32:24.99
2009	Universiade	Belgrade, Serbia	1st	10,000 m	28:21.44
2011	Universiade	Shenzhen, China	6th	10,000 m	29:34.65
2011	Universiade	Shenzhen, China	5th	Half marathon	1:07:32
2012	African Championships	Porto-Novo, Benin	12th	5000 m	14:19.49
2012	World Half Marathon Championships	Kavarna, Bulgaria	18th	Half marathon	1:03:46
2013	Universiade	Kazan, Russia	1st	Half marathon	1:03:37
2015	Universiade	Gwangju, South Korea	6th	10,000 m	29:37.55
2015	Universiade	Gwangju, South Korea	15th	Half marathon	1:09:26
2016	African Championships	Durban, South Africa	10th	10,000 m	28:24.50

== Personal bests ==
- 3000 metres – 7:50.90 (Metz 2011)
- 5000 metres – 13:24.50 (Stellenbosch 2012)
- 10,000 metres – 27:56.9 (Stellenbosch)
- 10 kilometres – 28:22 (Cape Town 2014)
- 20 kilometres – 58:41 (Prague 2014)
- Half marathon – 1:01:12 (New Delhi 2013)
- Marathon – 2:17:43 (Fukuoka 2014)
