= Hironori Tsuetaki =

Japanese long-distance runner

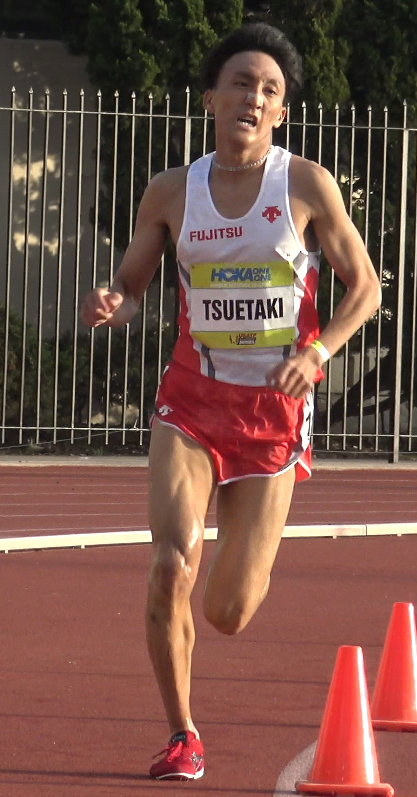

Personal information
- Born: 8 May 1993 (age 32) Kinokawa, Wakayama, Japan
- Education: Chuo Gakuin University
- Height: 1.75 m (5 ft 9 in)
- Weight: 60 kg (132 lb)

Sport
- Sport: Athletics
- Event: 3000 m steeplechase
- Club: Fujitsu

Hironori Tsuetaki (潰滝 大記, Tsuetaki Hironori; born 8 May 1993) is a Japanese long-distance runner. He represented his country in the 3000 metres steeplechase at the 2017 World Championships without qualifying for the final.

== International competitions ==
Year	Competition	Venue	Position	Event	Notes
Representing Japan
2015	Universiade	Gwangju, South Korea	6th	5000 m	14:13.54
2015	Universiade	Gwangju, South Korea	9th	10,000 m	29:52.91
2015	Universiade	Gwangju, South Korea	–	Half marathon	DNF
2017	World Championships	London, United Kingdom	38th (h)	3000 m s'chase	8:45.81

== Personal bests ==
Outdoor

- 10,000 metres – 28:16.49 (Machida 2016)
- 3000 metres steeplechase – 8:29.05 (Abashiri 2017)
