= 2011 Asian Athletics Championships – Men's 5000 metres =

The men's 5000 metres at the 2011 Asian Athletics Championships was held at the Kobe Universiade Memorial Stadium on July 9.

== Medalists ==
| Gold | Dejenee Mootumaa; Bahrain |
| Silver | Yuki Sato; Japan |
| Bronze | Alemu Bekele Gebre; Bahrain |

== Records ==
2011 Asian Athletics Championships
| World record | Kenenisa Bekele (ETH) | 12:37.35 | Hengelo, Netherlands | 31 May 2004 |
| Asian record | Saif Saeed Shaheen (QAT) | 12:51.98 | Rome, Italy | 14 July 2006 |
| Championship record | Dejenee Mootumaa (BHR) | 13:39.71 | Kobe, Japan | 2011 |

=== Final ===
| Rank | Name | Nationality | Time | Notes |
|---|---|---|---|---|
| 1st place, gold medalist(s) | Dejenee Mootumaa | Bahrain | 13:39.71 | CR |
| 2nd place, silver medalist(s) | Yuki Sato | Japan | 13:40.78 | |
| 3rd place, bronze medalist(s) | Alemu Bekele Gebre | Bahrain | 13:41.93 | |
| 4 | Kazuya Watanabe | Japan | 13:48.81 | |
| 5 | Tetsuya Yoroizaka | Japan | 13:54.35 | |
| 6 | Suresh Kumar | India | 14:05.64 | |
| 7 | Mohammad Khazaei | Iran | 14:08.81 | |
| 8 | Agus Prayogo | Indonesia | 14:10.85 | |
| 9 | Ser-Od Bat-Ochir | Mongolia | 14:18.53 | |
| 10 | Qais Al Mahruqi | Oman | 14:24.13 | |
| 11 | Ahmad Al-Ibrahem | Syria | 14:25.96 | |
| 12 | Baek Seung-Ho | South Korea | 14:38.31 | |
| 13 | Van Lai Nguyen | Vietnam | 14:50.93 | |
| 14 | Nader al-Masri | Palestine | 14:51.12 | |
| 15 | Hari Kumar Rimal | Nepal | 15:16.55 | |
| 16 | Dorjpalam Batbayar | Mongolia | 15:17.21 | |
| 17 | Mamoun Bali | Palestine | 16:05.08 | |
| 18 | Augusto Ramos Soares | Timor-Leste | 16:20.86 | |
