= Tetsuya Yoroizaka =

Japanese athlete

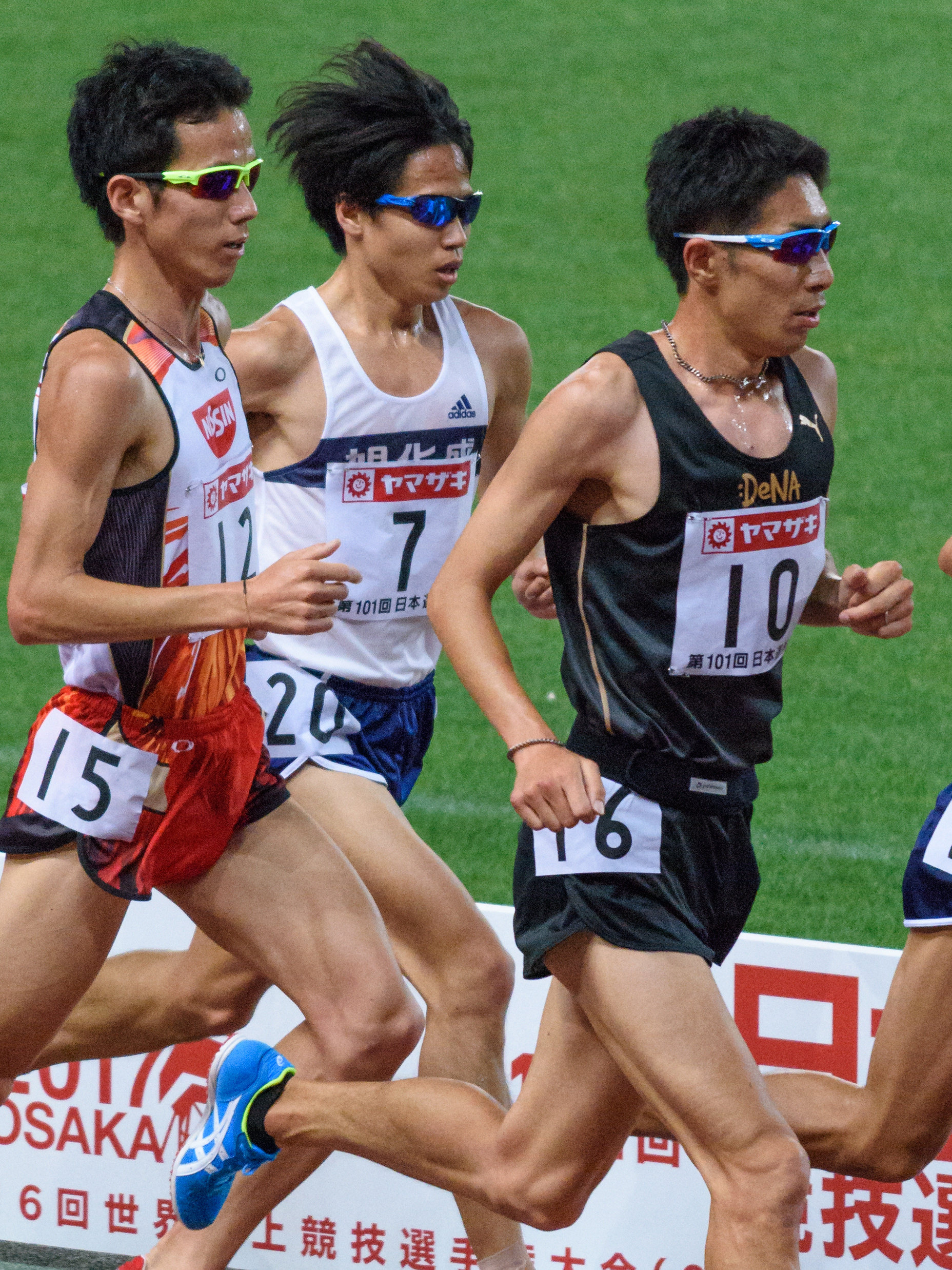
- center (#7)

Personal information
- Born: 20 March 1990 (age 36)
- Height: 1.65 m (5 ft 5 in)
- Weight: 50 kg (110 lb)

Sport
- Sport: Track and field
- Event(s): 5000 metres, 10,000 metres
Medal record
Men's athletics
Representing Japan
Asian Indoor Championships
Bronze medal – third place	2014 Hangzhou	3000 m

Tetsuya Yoroizaka (鎧坂 哲哉, Yoroizaka Tetsuya; born 20 March 1990) is a Japanese long-distance runner. He competed in the 10,000 metres at the 2015 World Championships in Beijing.

== International competitions ==
Year	Competition	Venue	Position	Event	Notes
Representing Japan
2011	Asian Championships	Kobe, Japan	5th	5000 m	13:54.35
2011	Universiade	Shenzhen, China	5th	10,000 m	29:32.21
2014	Asian Indoor Championships	Hangzhou, China	3rd	3000 m	8:11.73
2015	World Championships	Beijing, China	18th	10,000 m	28:25.77
2019	Asian Championships	Doha, Qatar	4th	10,000 m	28:44.86

== Personal bests ==
Outdoor

- 5000 metres – 13:12.63 (Heusden-Zolder 2015)
- 10,000 metres – 27:29.74 (Machida 2015)

Indoor

- 3000 metres – 8:11.73 (Hangzhou 2014)
