= Suguru Osako =

Japanese long-distance runner (born 1991)

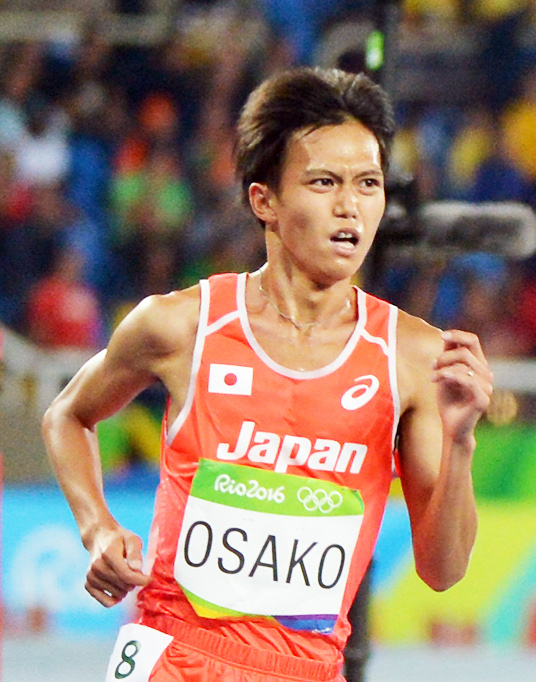
- Osako at the 2016 Olympics

Personal information
- Born: 23 May 1991 (age 35) Machida, Japan
- Height: 1.70 m (5 ft 7 in)
- Weight: 52 kg (115 lb)

Sport
- Country: Japan
- Sport: Track and field
- Event(s): 10,000 metres, Marathon
Medal record
Summer Universiade
Gold medal – first place	2011 Shenzhen	10,000 metres
Asian Games
Silver medal – second place	2014 Incheon	10,000 metres

Suguru Osako (大迫傑, Ōsako Suguru; born 23 May 1991) is a Japanese long-distance runner. He won the 10,000 metres gold medal at the 2011 Summer Universiade in Shenzhen and holds the Asian junior record for the half marathon. He held the Japanese National Record for the marathon of 2:04:55 set at the 2025 Valencia Marathon where he finished fourth.

Born in Machida, Tokyo, he attended Saku Chosei High School and began to establish himself nationally in 2010. He was the fastest in his stage at the Japanese High School Ekiden Championship and came second in the junior race at the Chiba Cross Country. This gained him a place on the Japanese junior team for the 2010 IAAF World Cross Country Championships, where he went on to finish in 32nd place. On the track that year he set a personal best of 28:35.75 minutes in Tokyo then finished eighth at the 2010 World Junior Championships in Athletics. After graduating from high school, he enrolled at Waseda University in late 2010. In November he ran at the Ageo City Half Marathon and set a Japanese and Asian junior record time of 1:01:47 hours to win the race.

In 2011 he ran a 5000 metres track best of 13:31.27 minutes and came second over 10,000 metres at the Hyogo Relays. Osako was chosen to represent his country at the 2011 Summer Universiade, where he defeated Stephen Mokoka in the 10,000 m to take the gold medal, becoming the first Japanese since Yasuyuki Watanabe to win that title. At the start of the 2012 season he was the top Japanese finisher at the Chiba Cross Country (fourth overall) and had a narrow win at the Fukuoka Cross Country, beating Yuki Sato. Osako improved his track bests in 2012, running 3:42.68 minutes for the 1500 metres, 7:54.68 minutes for the 3000 metres and 27:56.94 minutes for the 10,000 m.

He was runner-up to Charles Ndirangu at the 2013 Fukuoka Cross Country.

He finished third in the 2018 Chicago Marathon with the national record at the time of 2:05:50 h, earning him 100 Million Yen.

He finished fourth in the 2020 Tokyo Marathon where he broke his own national record with a time of 2:05:29.

He is formerly a member of the Nike Oregon Project.

He broke the Japanese national marathon record in the 2025 Valencia marathon, coming in 4th in 2:04:55

== 2021 Home Olympics and planned retirement ==
Osako's first race of the year came on 28 May at the Portland Track festival, where he competed in back-to-back 10000m races, winning the first in 27:56.44 and placing 2nd in the next race in 29:04.28.

Before competing in the Olympic marathon Osako announced he would retire after the race.

At the 2020 Olympic Games men's marathon, Suguru Osako placed 6th in 2:10:41. The race was won by Eliud Kipchoge.

== Achievements ==
Year	Competition	Venue	Position	Event	Notes
Representing Japan
2010	World Junior Championships	Moncton, Canada	8th	10,000 m	29:40.14
2011	Summer Universiade	Shenzhen, China	1st	10,000 m	28:42.83
2012	Fukuoka International Cross Country	Fukuoka, Japan	1st	10 km	30:27
2013	World Championships	Moscow, Russia	21st	10,000 m	28:19.50
2014	Asian Games	Incheon, South Korea	2nd	10,000 m	28:11.94
2015	World Championships	Beijing, China	22nd (h)	5000 m	13:45.82
2016	Olympic Games	Rio de Janeiro, Brazil	28th (h)	5000 m	13:31.45
2016	Olympic Games	Rio de Janeiro, Brazil	17th	10,000 m	27:51.94
2021	Olympic Games	Sapporo, Japan	6th	Marathon	2:10:41
2024	Olympic Games	Paris, France	13th	Marathon	2:09:25
