= Dambadarjaagiin Gantulga =

Mongolian long-distance runner

Personal information
- Born: 3 February 1989 (age 37) Mongolia

Sport
- Country: Mongolia
- Sport: Athletics
- Event: 10000 m

Dambadarjaagiin Gantulga (born February 3, 1989) is a Mongolian long-distance runner who competes in road races, particularly the marathon.

== 2013 season ==
Dambadarjaa finished 29th in the men's half marathon at the 2013 Summer Universiade.

== 2014 season ==
He finished 9th in the men's marathon at the 2014 Asian Games.

== 2015 season ==
Dambadarjaa competed at the 2015 IAAF World Cross Country Championships where he finished 103rd.

He finished 29th in the men's half marathon at the 2015 Summer Universiade.

Additionally, he finished 9th at the Beijing Marathon with a time of 2:18.16. This time meets the qualification standard for the 2016 Olympics.

== 2016 season ==
He finished 11th at the Xiamen International Marathon with a time of 2:18.52.

== 2018 season ==
On February 28, he finished 6th in the Gyeongju Half Marathon, Korea, in 1:04:36. On March 18, he finished 18th in the Seoul Marathon, Korea, in 2:17:19. On March 25, he finished 10th in the Incheon Half Marathon, Korea, in 1:05:34. On April 8, he finished 8th in the Gunsan Marathon, Korea, in 2:20:22.

== 2019 season ==
On March 17, he finished 6th in the Seoul Marathon, Korea, in 2:16:18. On September 29, he finished 67th in the Berlin Marathon in 2:19:39.

== 2021 season ==
He finished 19th at the Berlin Marathon with a time of 2:18:28
