= Athletics at the 2011 Summer Universiade – Men's 10,000 metres =

The men's 10,000 metres event at the 2011 Summer Universiade was held on 17 August.

Sergey Rybin of Russia was leading the race for almost the entire distance, but as the race progressed he was tiring rather badly. With 300 metres to go, he was finally overtaken by Suguru Osako of Japan and collapsed from exhaustion soon after. Osako went on to win the race while Rybin had to be taken out on a stretcher.

== Results ==
Rank	Name	Nationality	Time	Notes
1st place, gold medalist(s)	Suguru Osako	Japan	28:42.83	SB
2nd place, silver medalist(s)	Stephen Mokoka	South Africa	28:53.09	
3rd place, bronze medalist(s)	Ahmed Tamri	Morocco	29:06.20	
4	Evgeny Rybakov	Russia	29:10.86	
5	Tetsuya Yoroizaka	Japan	29:32.21	
6	Sibabalwe Mzazi	South Africa	29:34.65	
7	Joseph Chebet	Uganda	30:03.52	
8	Rolf Rüfenacht	Switzerland	30:18.24	SB
9	Stsiapan Rahautsou	Belarus	30:29.33	
10	Paul Avila	Bolivia	32:13.50	
11	Kim Byunghyun	South Korea	32:37.64	
12	Henrik Lofas	Sweden	32:45.16	
13	Paul Sitima	Malawi	33:27.54	
14	Niels Fredslund	Denmark	33:27.72	
15	Godwin Oduro Friko	Ghana	34:08.63	
16	Patrice Lompo	Benin	34:17.37	
17	Melchior Mirindi	Burundi	34:53.58	
18	Munyaradzi Gorimbo	Zimbabwe	35:19.70	
	Kennedy Chemeitoi	Kenya	DNF	
	Denis Mayaud	France	DNF	
	Sergey Rybin	Russia	DNF	
	Damian Sikuka	Zambia	DNF	
	Tian Huadong	China	DNF	
	Obed Tiony Kipkemboi	Kenya	DNF	
	Mohmmad Khazaei	Iran	DNS	

Official Video
