= François Barrer =

French long-distance runner (1993 - )

Personal information
- Born: 8 June 1993 (age 33) Reims, France
- Education: Lille 2 University of Health and Law
- Height: 1.84 m (6 ft 0 in)
- Weight: 62 kg (137 lb)

Sport
- Sport: Athletics
- Event: 5000 metres
- Club: DAC Reims
- Coached by: Madaci Farouk (2016–)

François Barrer (born 8 June 1993 in Reims) is a French long-distance runner. He won a gold medal in the 5000 metres at the 2017 Summer Universiade.

== International competitions ==
Year	Competition	Venue	Position	Event	Notes
Representing France
2011	European Junior Championships	Tallinn, Estonia	6th	5000 m	14:39.83
2012	World Junior Championships	Barcelona, Spain	10th	5000 m	14:16.46
2013	European U23 Championships	Tampere, Finland	10th	5000 m	14:34.30
2017	Jeux de la Francophonie	Abidjan, Ivory Coast	5th	5000 m	14:12.91
2017	Universiade	Taipei, Taiwan	1st	5000 m	14:00.86
2018	European Championships	Berlin, Germany	26th	10,000 m	30:22.91

== Personal bests ==
Outdoor

- 1000 metres – 2:24.2 (Monaco 2013)
- 1500 metres – 3:42.23 (Bruay-la-Buissiere 2017)
- 3000 metres – 8:06.19 (Oordegem 2014)
- 5000 metres – 13:27.69 (Carquefou 2017)
- 10 kilometres – 30:17 (Paris 2015)
- 3000 metres steeplechase – 9:11.41 (Reims 2017)

Indoor

- 1500 metres – 3:49.96 (Nantes 2017)
- 3000 metres – 8:06.31 (Reims 2015)
