= Florent Caelen =

Belgian long-distance runner

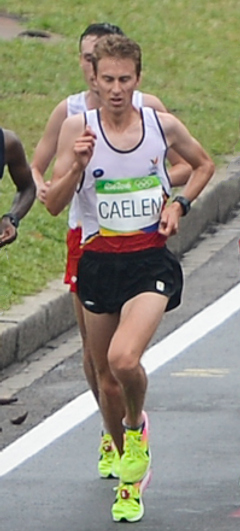
- Caelen at the 2016 Olympics

Personal information
- Born: 1 March 1989 (age 37)
- Height: 175 cm (5 ft 9 in)
- Weight: 54 kg (119 lb)

Sport
- Sport: Athletics
- Event: Marathon
- Coached by: Henri Salavarda

Achievements and titles
- Personal best: 2:12:51 (2015)

Florent Caelen (born 1 March 1989) is a Belgian long-distance runner. He finished 44th in the marathon at the 2016 Summer Olympics.

== Personal life ==
Caelen speaks French and English and has a degree in geography and geometrics from the University of Liège. He works as an application engineer for Hexagon Geospatial.

== Olympic qualification ==
With a personal best of 2 hours 12 minutes and 51 seconds (achieved at the 2015 Berlin Marathon), Caelen was the third and final Belgian runner to meet the requirements for qualification of the Belgian Olympic Committee on 30 April 2016, which was the deadline the committee had communicated. However, in May 2016 they extended the deadline to 11 July 2016, and during that period Abdelhadi El Hachimi ran a marathon in 2 hours 10 minutes and 34 seconds, which meant that Caelen as the fourth fastest runner was no longer selected (Belgium only had the right to select three male marathon runners). Caelen contested this situation and won the court case, which meant that he became the third Belgian marathon runner in Rio instead of El Hachimi.
