= Abdi Hakin Ulad =

Danish long-distance runner

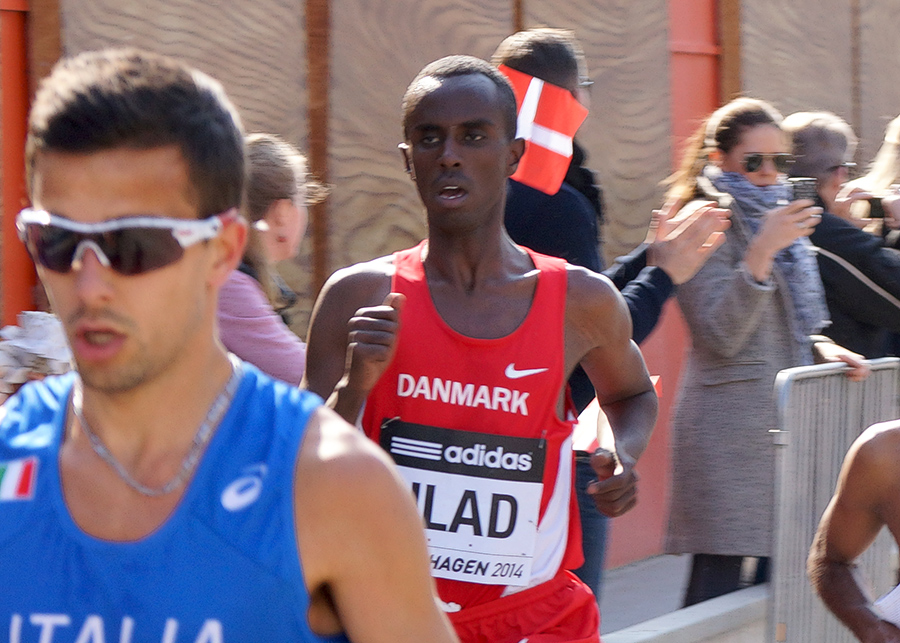
Abdi Ulad at the 2014 IAAF World Half Marathon Championships

Abdi-Hakin Achkel Ulad (born 14 June 1991 in Kismayo Town, Somalia) is a Danish track and field athlete competing in long-distance running (5,000 metres, 10,000 metres, half marathons and marathons). Ulad represented Denmark at the 2016 Summer Olympics and 2020 Summer Olympics. As of 2022, he is currently suspended following a failed drug test.

== Biography ==
At the age of eleven, he arrived as a refugee in Denmark together with his aunt. Abdi Hakin Ulad became a citizen of Denmark through naturalization on 28 October 2010. He lives in Skælskør, competes for Hvidovre AM and his coach is Leo Madsen.

On 11 July 2013, Ulad ran 10,000 metres in 29m 44.78sec and achieved a bronze medal at the 2013 European Athletics U23 Championships in Tampere, Finland.

On 13 September 2015, Ulad became Danish half marathon champion with the time of 1h 2m 48sec. At the 2016 European Athletics Championships in Amsterdam, Ulad ranked as number five at the half marathon with the time of 1h 3min 22sec.

His first marathon was in 2015, and on his second try at this distance at the Hamburg Marathon, he finished with the best Danish time since 1989 – 2h 14 min 3sec, which also qualified him for the 2016 Summer Olympics in Rio de Janeiro.

In 2018, he competed in the men's marathon at the 2018 European Athletics Championships held in Berlin, Germany. He did not finish his race.

In December 2019, he ran his personal best on the marathon distance at the Fukuoka Marathon in Japan. With the finish time of 2h 11min 3sec he qualified for the 2020 Summer Olympics in Tokyo, Japan.

In November 2022 it was revealed Ulad had failed a doping test for trimetazidine. He declined to have his B sample tested and admitted to the doping offense via a Facebook post, describing it as "the worse decision of his life".

== Personal bests ==
Discipline	Performance	Pace	Place	Date
5000 metres	13.56.64	02.47	Oodegem, Belgium	1 June 2013
10000 Metres	28.39.14	02.52	Leiden, the Netherlands	14 June 2014
Half marathon	1.02.15	02.57	Valencia, Spain	24 March 2018
Marathon	2.11.03	03.06	Fukuoka City, Japan	1 December 2019

Source: IAAF
