= Yuki Sato (runner) =

Japanese long-distance runner

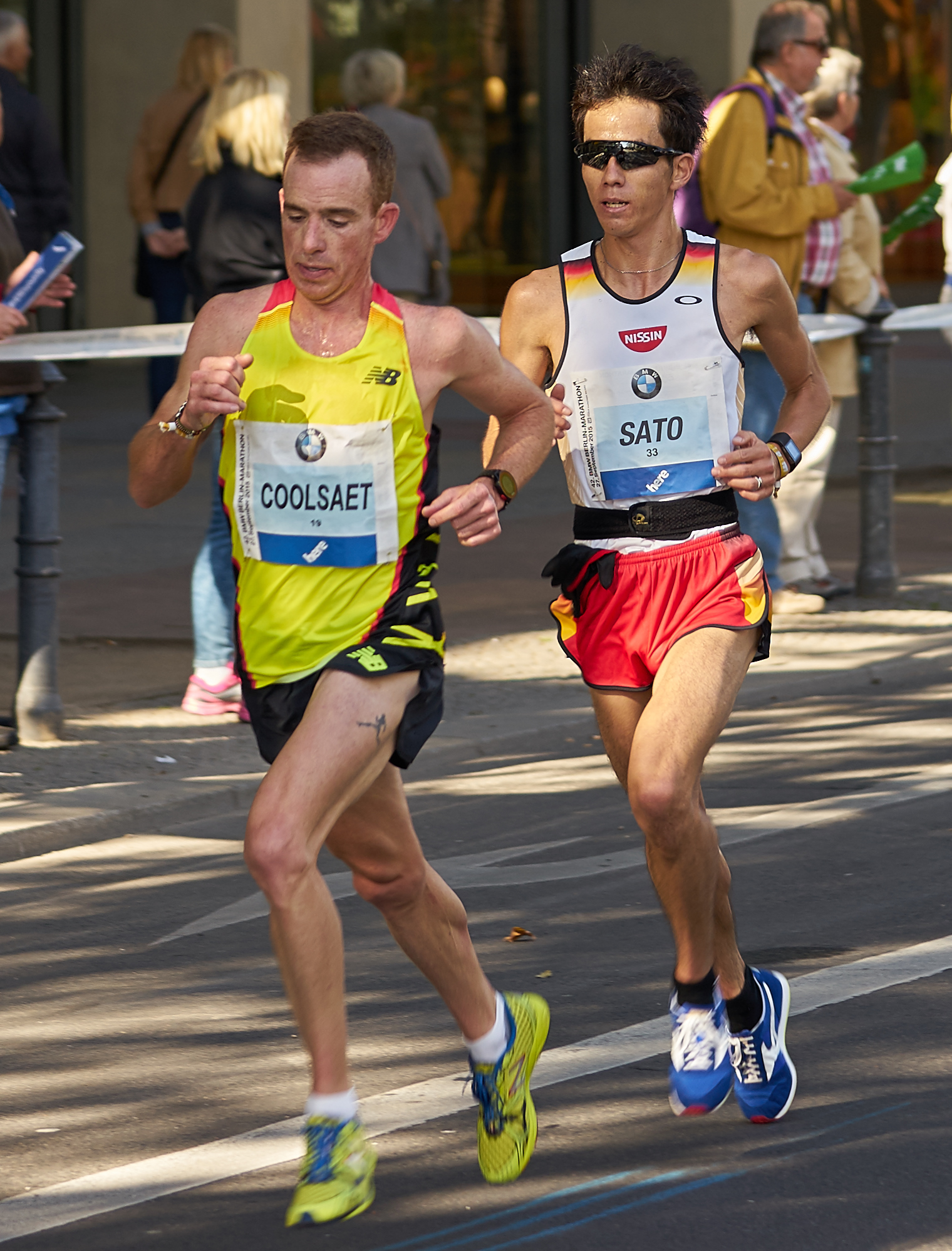
Yuki Sato (right) at the Berlin Marathon 2015

Yuki Sato (佐藤 悠基, Satō Yūki; born 26 November 1986 in Shimizu, Shizuoka) is a Japanese long-distance runner. At the 2012 Summer Olympics, he competed in the Men's 5000 metres, finished 26th overall in Round 1, and thus failed to qualify for the final. He also competed in the men's 10000 metres, finishing in 22nd place.

== International competitions ==
Representing Japan
Year	Competition	Venue	Position	Event	Notes
2003	World Youth Championships	Sherbrooke, Canada	10th	3000 m	8:38.45
2004	World Cross Country Championships	Brussels, Belgium	46th	Junior	26:47
2004	World Junior Championships	Grosseto, Italy	13th	5000m	14:15.62
2005	World Cross Country Championships	Saint-Galmier, France	47th	Junior	26:21
2005	Universiade	İzmir, Turkey	4th	10,000 m	28:43.46
2005	Universiade	İzmir, Turkey	7th	5000 m	13:57.35
2008	World Cross Country Championships	Edinburgh, United Kingdom	93rd	Senior	38:19
2011	Asian Championships	Kobe, Japan	2nd	5000 m	13:40.78
2011	World Championships	Daegu, South Korea	15th	10,000 m	29:04.15
2012	Olympic Games	London, United Kingdom	22nd	10,000 m	28:44.06
2012	Olympic Games	London, United Kingdom	11th (q)	5000 m	13:38.22
2013	World Championships	Moscow, Russia	—	10,000 m	DNF
2013	World Championships	Moscow, Russia	23rd	5000 m	13:37.07
2014	Asian Games	Incheon, South Korea	6th	5000 m	13:34.97
