= James Ngandu =

Kenyan long-distance runner

Personal information
- Nationality: Kenyan
- Born: April 2, 1990 (age 36)

Sport
- Sport: Athletics
- Events: Long-distance running (Marathon, Half Marathon, Track)
- Coached by: Jeremy Croy (collegiate)

James Ngandu (born 2 April 1990) is a Kenyan long-distance runner who specializes in marathon and half marathon races. He gained prominence by winning the 2022 Houston Marathon and previously excelled as an NCAA Division II national champion in cross country and track while competing for Tiffin University. His personal bests include 2:10:17 in the marathon and 1:01:28 in the half marathon.

== Career ==
Ngandu began his running career in Kenya before moving to the United States, where he competed collegiately for Tiffin University in Ohio. At Tiffin, he became one of the most accomplished athletes in the school's history, earning a Bachelor of Criminal Justice in Law Enforcement and a Master of Business Administration in Leadership.

=== Collegiate career ===
Ngandu competed in distance running events in the NCAA Division II. In 2016, he won his second consecutive Great Lakes Intercollegiate Athletic Conference (GLIAC) Cross Country Championship, earning GLIAC Runner of the Year honors. He also captured the NCAA Midwest Region title and placed third at the NCAA Division II Cross Country National Championships, earning All-American status.

In 2017, he completed an undefeated cross country season and won the NCAA Division II National Championship by a 34-second margin. He also secured his third consecutive GLIAC title and second consecutive Midwest Region title, receiving GLIAC Male Athlete of the Year, Midwest Region Athlete of the Year, and National Runner of the Year awards. On the track, Ngandu won the 3000 meters and 5000 meters at the 2017 GLIAC Indoor Championships. He went on to place 2nd in the 5000m and 3rd in the 3000m at the NCAA Indoor National Championships.

In the 2018 outdoor season, he became the NCAA Division II national champion in the 10,000 meters and placed fourth in the 5000 meters. He earned multiple All-American honors throughout his collegiate track career.

=== Professional career ===
After graduating in 2019, Ngandu began competing professionally in road races. In July 2019, Ngandu won the Buffalo Four-Mile Chase race in 18:14 minutes. In 2021, he won the Columbus Half Marathon.

On January 16, 2022, he won the 50th Houston Marathon in a sprint finish with a time of 2:11:03. On May 7, 2022, he won the OneAmerica 500 Festival Mini-Marathon in Indianapolis, finishing in 1:03:25. His personal best half marathon time of 1:01:28 was set on May 1, 2022, when he finished second at the UPMC Health Plan Pittsburgh Half Marathon.

== Personal bests ==
As of May 2025, Ngandu's personal bests are:

- 3000 meters (Indoor) – 8:01.61 (Youngstown, 3 February 2017)
- 5000 meters (Indoor) – 13:57.21 (Boston, 9 February 2018)
- 5000 meters (Outdoor) – 13:46.63 (Stanford, 30 March 2018)
- 10,000 meters (Outdoor) – 28:45.96 (Raleigh, 30 March 2018)
- 10 miles (Road) – 46:27 (New Haven, 10 October 2021)
- Half Marathon – 1:01:28 (Pittsburgh, 1 May 2022)
- Marathon – 2:10:17 (June 18, 2022)
