= Mohammad Jafar Moradi =

Iranian long-distance runner

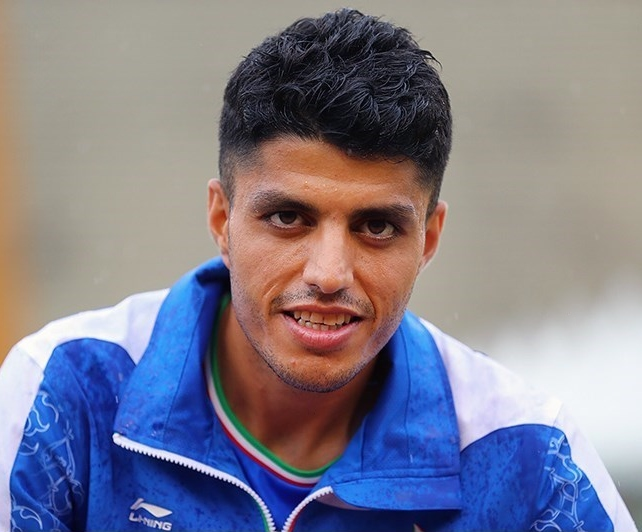
- Moradi at the 2016 Olympics

Personal information
- Nationality: Iranian
- Born: محمدجعفر مرادی; 10 April 1990 (age 36) Gilan-e Gharb, Kermanshah province, Iran
- Height: 169 cm (5 ft 7 in)
- Weight: 62 kg (137 lb)

Sport
- Country: Iran
- Sport: Track and field
- Events: Marathon, long-distance running
- Coached by: Ashkan Gholami

Achievements and titles
- Personal best: Marathon: 2:17:14 (2023)

Mohammad Jafar Moradi (Persian: محمدجعفر مرادی, born 10 April 1990) is an Iranian long-distance runner. He competed in the marathon at the 2015 World Championships and 2016 Olympics. Moradi broke his own record of marathon on 24 September 2023 as Iran's record with a time of 2:17:14 set at the 2023 Berlin Marathon.
He has a degree in physical education from the Islamic Azad University, Tehran.
