= Geometrics =

English indie rock band

- Origin: Stevenage, Hertfordshire, England
- Genres: Indie, rock, shoegaze, alternative rock
- Years active: 2008–present
- Label: White Records
- Members: Matt Toll: Vocals; Alex Keshavarzi: Vocals/Guitars; Aidan Ward: Vocals/Guitars; Luke Travers: Vocals/Drums; Lindsay Banks: Bass
- Website: www.myspace.com/geometricsband

Geometrics are an English five piece indie rock band from Hertfordshire, England.

== History ==
Previously called 'The Art Of Opposition' until they re-formed with new members, complete new material and a new name (Geometrics). Formed as Geometrics in November 2008 with new members Aidan Ward & Lindsay Banks (formally of 'The Homewreckers Club').

Currently unsigned, the band were popular around their hometown of Hitchin in Hertfordshire. They have also played several gigs around the country including some notable performances such as headlining the Camden Barfly and playing festivals such as CazFest Bishop Stortford and LeeFest in Suffolk.

On 4 April 2009, Geometrics released their first official single "Sixth Sense". The single has been well received and has earned them airtime on Huw Stevens & Steve Lamacq - BBC Radio One show, and also making regular appearances with BBC Introducing and XFM. On 29 May 2009, Geometrics were invited into the BBC Three Counties Studios to perform three live songs and take part in an interview and a regular feature on the show "Band on a Bike".

In January 2010, Geometrics recorded two new songs yet to be released, and their new single "Blind Silhouettes".

Due to university constraints of some members and different creative differences, Luke Travers has decided to leave Geometrics for "fresher pastures", whilst considered his time with Geometrics "fun, but a complete waste of my time"

== Critical reception ==
AudioTart's Peter Coulston described the Geometrics as being "An overall competent band who do what they do well"

== Discography ==
=== Singles ===
"Sixth Sense" (4 April 2009, UK), CD featuring "Three's a Crowd (Single Version)"

== Notable achievements ==
- Profiled by the BBC's Introducing series, including a band profile page on the BBC Three Counties Radio website
- Headlined act Club Remix, Hitchin 27 February 2009
- They appeared on Herts, Beds and Bucks BBC Three Counties Radio on 5 April 2009, on the BBC's nationwide 'introducing' series.
- Since their formation Geometrics have played in venues across UK with acts such as Kate Nash, The Subways, Iglu & Hartly, Bombay Bicycle Club, The Paddingtons, Pete & The Pirates, Metronomy, The Metros & Tinchy Stryder & more.
- Charting at No.4 in the Myspace Chart
- Named band of the week on XFM website
- Also had regular airplay on Steve Lamacq's Radio 1 In New Music We Trust show, John Kennedy's XFM show & Virgin Radio France

== Interviews ==
- Geometrics have it all figured out- 26/02/2009 12:12:00
