= Daniel Estrada (athlete) =

Chilean long-distance runner

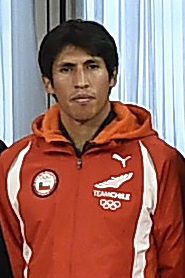

Personal information
- Born: 27 February 1990 (age 36)

Sport
- Sport: Track and field
- Event: Marathon

Daniel Estrada (born 27 February 1990) is a Chilean long-distance runner who specialises in the marathon. He competed in the men's marathon event at the 2016 Summer Olympics.
