= Nicolae Soare =

Romanian long-distance runner

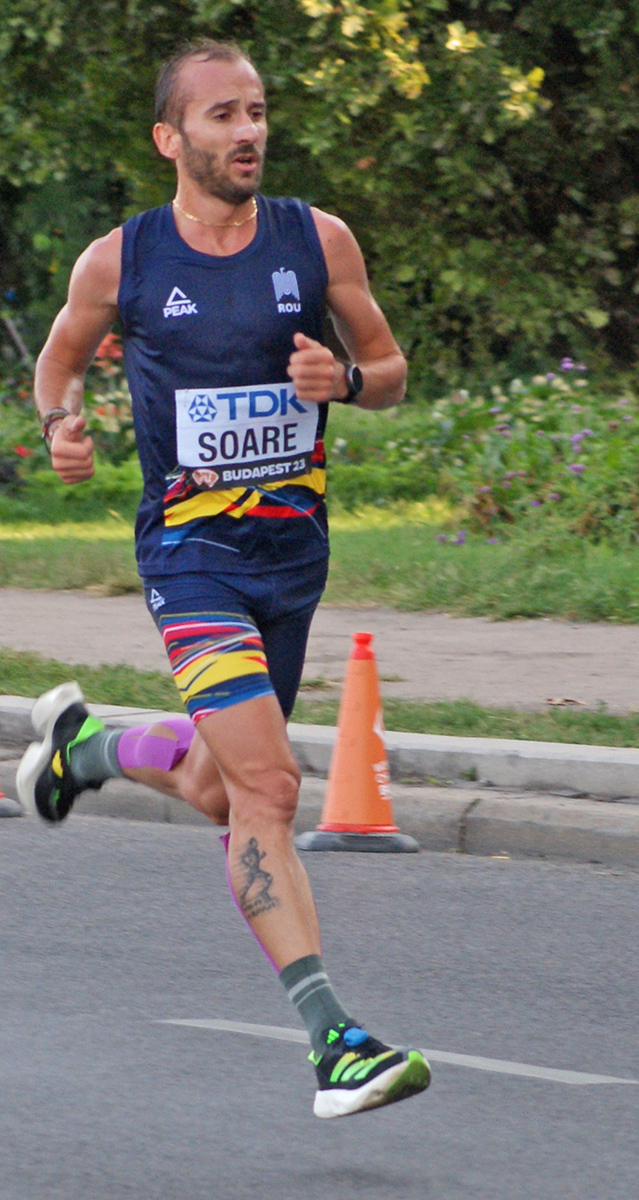

Personal information
- Full name: Nicolae Alexandru Soare
- Born: 20 September 1991 (age 34)

Sport
- Sport: Track and field
- Event: Marathon

Nicolae Alexandru Soare (born 20 September 1991) is a Romanian long-distance runner who specialises in the marathon. He competed in the men's marathon event at the 2016 Summer Olympics. He won silver medals in the 10,000 metres at the 2015 and 2017 Universiades. In 2020, he competed in the men's race at the 2020 World Athletics Half Marathon Championships held in Gdynia, Poland.

His personal best times are 14:00.35 minutes in the 5000 metres, achieved in Ponzano Veneto in June 2018; 28:25.38 minutes in the 10,000 metres, achieved in London in May 2018; 1:04:07 hours in the half marathon, achieved in March 2014 in Copenhagen; and 2:18:52 hours in the marathon, achieved at the 2016 Hamburg Marathon.

He tested positive for meldonium (doping substance) in 2016 and was subsequently banned from competition for a number of months.
