= 2006 Asian Indoor Athletics Championships – Results =

These are the official results of the 2006 Asian Indoor Athletics Championships which took place on 10–12 February 2008 in Pattaya, Thailand.

== Men's results ==
=== 60 meters ===
Heats – 10 February

Rank	Heat	Name	Nationality	Time	Notes
1	1	Vyacheslav Muravyev	Kazakhstan	6.77	Q
2	3	Pang Guibin	China	6.78	Q, SB
3	2	Sompote Suwannarangsri	Thailand	6.80	Q
4	1	Ekkachai Janthana	Thailand	6.82	Q
5	1	Gong Wei	China	6.83	Q
5	3	Wachara Sondee	Thailand	6.83	Q
7	2	Vitaly Medvedev	Kazakhstan	6.85	Q
8	1	Khalil Al-Hanahneh	Jordan	6.86	Q, NR
9	2	Chiang Wai Hung	Hong Kong	6.89	Q
10	2	Aissa Al-Yoha	Kuwait	6.93	Q, =SB
11	2	Mohamad Siraj Tamim	Lebanon	6.96	q, NR
12	3	Mohd Faizal Maslin	Malaysia	6.96	Q
13	1	Chien Kuo-Lien	Chinese Taipei	7.02	Q
14	1	Asrul Akbar	Indonesia	7.04	q, PB
15	2	Erzalm Fawzy Rawi	Singapore	7.05	q
16	1	Ravindran Shanmuganathan	Malaysia	7.07	q
17	3	Radhakrishnan Muthukumaran	Singapore	7.16	PB
18	3	Jarah Al-Khadher	Kuwait	7.30	SB
19	3	Souksavanh Tonsacktheva	Laos	7.34	PB
20	1	Daraphirit Sam	Cambodia	7.42	PB
21	2	Panha Yin	Cambodia	7.44	PB
22	2	Zahir Naseer	Maldives	7.44	SB

Semifinals – 10 February

Rank	Heat	Name	Nationality	Time	Notes
1	1	Gong Wei	China	6.70	Q
2	1	Vyacheslav Muravyev	Kazakhstan	6.72	Q
3	1	Ekkachai Janthana	Thailand	6.77	Q
3	2	Sompote Suwannarangsri	Thailand	6.77	Q, SB
5	2	Wachara Sondee	Thailand	6.78	Q
6	2	Pang Guibin	China	6.81	Q
7	2	Vitaly Medvedev	Kazakhstan	6.81	Q
8	1	Chiang Wai Hung	Hong Kong	6.82	Q
9	1	Khalil Al-Hanahneh	Jordan	6.88	
10	1	Chien Kuo-Lien	Chinese Taipei	6.93	PB
10	2	Mohd Faizal Maslin	Malaysia	6.93	PB
10	2	Aissa Al-Yoha	Kuwait	6.93	
13	2	Mohamad Siraj Tamim	Lebanon	6.95	=NR
14	2	Erzalm Fawzy Rawi	Singapore	6.98	PB
15	1	Ravindran Shanmuganathan	Malaysia	7.01	PB
16	2	Asrul Akbar	Indonesia	7.04	=PB

Final – 10 February

Rank	Name	Nationality	Time	Notes
1st place, gold medalist(s)	Gong Wei	China	6.64	CR, PB
2nd place, silver medalist(s)	Wachara Sondee	Thailand	6.65	NR
3rd place, bronze medalist(s)	Vyacheslav Muravyev	Kazakhstan	6.67	PB
4	Ekkachai Janthana	Thailand	6.71	PB
5	Sompote Suwannarangsri	Thailand	6.74	SB
6	Vitaly Medvedev	Kazakhstan	6.76	
7	Pang Guibin	China	6.79	
8	Chiang Wai Hung	Hong Kong	7.14	

=== 400 meters ===
Heats – 10 February

Rank	Heat	Name	Nationality	Time	Notes
1	1	Mohamed Salim Al-Rawahi	Oman	48.33	Q
2	1	Suphachai Phachsai	Thailand	48.49	Q, NR
3	1	Yevgeniy Meleshenko	Kazakhstan	48.53	q
4	2	Jukkatip Pojaroen	Thailand	48.64	Q
5	1	Humoud Al-Saad	Kuwait	48.70	q, NR
6	2	Mohd Zuslaini Zafril	Malaysia	48.81	Q, NR
7	2	Tulapong Sutaso	Thailand	49.13	PB
8	2	Chen Chih-Hsuen	Chinese Taipei	49.39	NR
9	2	Fares Aftan	Iraq	49.75	NR
10	1	Zahir Naseer	Maldives	54.14	NR

Final – 11 February

Rank	Name	Nationality	Time	Notes
1st place, gold medalist(s)	Mohamed Salim Al-Rawahi	Oman	47.90	NR
2nd place, silver medalist(s)	Jukkatip Pojaroen	Thailand	48.62	
3rd place, bronze medalist(s)	Yevgeniy Meleshenko	Kazakhstan	48.65	
4	Suphachai Phachsai	Thailand	48.73	
5	Mohd Zuslaini Zafril	Malaysia	51.38	

=== 800 meters ===
Heats – 10 February

Rank	Heat	Name	Nationality	Time	Notes
1	1	Adam Abdu Adam Ali	Qatar	1:56.97	Q
2	1	Ghamanda Ram	India	1:57.09	Q, NR
3	1	Aleksandr Bazaev	Tajikistan	1:57.12	q, NR
4	1	Jayakumar Dewarajoo	Malaysia	1:58.26	q, NR
5	2	Salem Amer Al-Badri	Qatar	2:00.45	Q
6	2	Sasikumar Mohan	Malaysia	2:00.78	Q, PB
7	2	Firdavs Azizov	Tajikistan	2:00.80	NJR
8	2	Patarapong Kewdaend	Thailand	2:01.23	
9	2	Chen Fu-Pin	Chinese Taipei	2:01.31	PB
10	1	Sim Nathaniel	Singapore	2:01.31	
11	2	Rajamanickam Subais	Singapore	2:02.27	PB

Final – 11 February

Rank	Name	Nationality	Time	Notes
1st place, gold medalist(s)	Salem Amer Al-Badri	Qatar	1:50.93	PB
2nd place, silver medalist(s)	Adam Abdu Adam Ali	Qatar	1:51.29	PB
3rd place, bronze medalist(s)	Ghamanda Ram	India	1:51.45	
4	Aleksandr Bazaev	Tajikistan	1:55.10	NR
5	Jayakumar Dewarajoo	Malaysia	1:55.49	NR
6	Sasikumar Mohan	Malaysia	2:03.68	

=== 1500 meters ===
Heats – 11 February

Rank	Heat	Name	Nationality	Time	Notes
1	1	Ishaq Isa Abedeen	Bahrain	3:57.38	Q
2	2	Daham Najim Bashir	Qatar	3:57.41	Q
3	2	Saleh Marzooq Bakheet	Bahrain	3:57.45	Q
4	2	Chatholi Hamza	India	3:57.45	Q
5	2	Adnan Taess Akkar	Iraq	3:58.50	q, NR
6	2	Teerachai Rayabsri	Thailand	3:59.50	q, NJR
7	1	Yang Anyue	China	4:00.64	Q
8	2	Patikarn Pechsricha	Thailand	4:00.66	q, PB
9	1	Pritam Bind	India	4:03.81	Q
10	1	Boonyu Kaveerattanakajon	Thailand	4:05.40	
11	1	Hem Bunting	Cambodia	4:06.10	NR
12	1	Jayakumar Dewarajoo	Malaysia	4:23.05	NR
	1	Ajmal Amirov	Tajikistan	DNF	
	2	Aleksandr Bazaev	Tajikistan	DNF	

Final – 12 February

Rank	Name	Nationality	Time	Notes
1st place, gold medalist(s)	Daham Najim Bashir	Qatar	3:44.04	
2nd place, silver medalist(s)	Saleh Marzooq Bakheet	Bahrain	3:46.29	NR
3rd place, bronze medalist(s)	Pritam Bind	India	3:47.23	NR
4	Chatholi Hamza	India	3:47.26	SB
5	Ishaq Isa Abedeen	Bahrain	3:51.19	PB
6	Yang Anyue	China	3:54.46	
7	Teerachai Rayabsri	Thailand	3:56.12	NR
8	Patikarn Pechsricha	Thailand	4:01.89	
9	Adnan Taess Akkar	Iraq	4:02.36	

=== 3000 meters ===
11 February

Rank	Name	Nationality	Time	Notes
1st place, gold medalist(s)	Saif Saaeed Shaheen	Qatar	7:39.77	AR
2nd place, silver medalist(s)	Tareq Mubarak Taher	Bahrain	7:49.84	AJR
3rd place, bronze medalist(s)	Aadam Ismaeel Khamis	Bahrain	7:50.10	PB
4	Denis Bagrev	Kyrgyzstan	8:11.26	NR
5	Ajmal Amirov	Tajikistan	8:20.92	PB
6	Srisung Boonthung	Thailand	8:37.69	
7	Amnuay Tongmit	Thailand	8:50.66	
8	Jauhari Johan	Indonesia	9:01.99	NR
9	Hem Bunting	Cambodia	9:02.00	NR
10	Hariyono Saputro	Indonesia	9:22.42	PB
	Nasser Shams Kareem	Qatar	DNF	

=== 60 meters hurdles ===
11 February

Rank	Name	Nationality	Time	Notes
1st place, gold medalist(s)	Liu Lilu	China	7.79	PB
2nd place, silver medalist(s)	Chen Ming	China	7.84	PB
3rd place, bronze medalist(s)	Mohd Faiz Mohamad	Malaysia	7.91	NR
4	Tang Hon Sing	Hong Kong	8.10	SB
5	Suphan Wongsriphuck	Thailand	8.14	

=== 4 x 400 meters relay ===
12 February

Rank	Nation	Athletes	Time	Notes
1st place, gold medalist(s)	Thailand	Banjong Lachua, Jukkatip Pojaroen, Tulapong Sutaso, Suphachai Phachsai	3:15.53	
	Kuwait	Aissa Al-Yoha, Jarah Al-Khadher, Saleh Abdelaziz Al-Haddad, Humoud Al-Saad	DQ	
	Malaysia	Ravindran Shanmuganathan, Jayakumar Dewarajoo, Sasikumar Mohan, Mohd Zuslaini Zafril	DQ	

=== High jump ===
10 February

Rank	Name	Nation	Result	Notes
1st place, gold medalist(s)	Naoyuki Daigo	Japan	2.17	
2nd place, silver medalist(s)	Salem Nasser Bakheet	Bahrain	2.13	NR
3rd place, bronze medalist(s)	Huang Haiqiang	China	2.13	SB
4	Yoshihiro Edo	Japan	2.13	PB
5	Sergey Zasimovich	Kazakhstan	2.13	
6	Chokchai Jirasukrujee	Thailand	2.09	SB
7	Ahmad Najwan Aqra Hassam	Malaysia	2.09	SB
8	Salem Al-Anezi	Kuwait	2.05	SB
9	Suchart Singhaklang	Thailand	2.05	
10	Torlarp Sudjinda	Thailand	2.00	

=== Pole vault ===
11 February

Rank	Name	Nation	Result	Notes
1st place, gold medalist(s)	Daichi Sawano	Japan	5.60	
2nd place, silver medalist(s)	Yang Yansheng	China	5.40	SB
3rd place, bronze medalist(s)	Aleksandr Akhmedov	Kazakhstan	5.30	PB
4	Takehito Ariki	Japan	5.20	SB
5	Ali Makki Al-Sabagha	Kuwait	5.20	NR
6	Amnat Kunpadit	Thailand	5.00	NR
7	Fahad Bader Al-Mershad	Kuwait	4.90	SB
8	Sompong Soombankruay	Thailand	4.75	
8	Pichitopl Singthonghon	Thailand	4.75	NJR
10	Muhammad Ayub	Pakistan	4.60	NR

=== Long jump ===
10 February

Rank	Name	Nation	Result	Notes
1st place, gold medalist(s)	Zhang Xin	China	7.76	PB
2nd place, silver medalist(s)	Daisuke Arakawa	Japan	7.75	SB
3rd place, bronze medalist(s)	Saleh Al-Haddad	Kuwait	7.52	NR
4	Supawat Klanjai	Thailand	7.38	NR
5	Shahrul Amri Suhaimi	Malaysia	7.33	NR
6	Kittisak Sukon	Thailand	7.33	PB
7	Chao Chih-chien	Chinese Taipei	7.18	SB
8	Khalil Al-Hanahneh	Jordan	7.17	NR

=== Triple jump ===
12 February

Rank	Name	Nation	Result	Notes
1st place, gold medalist(s)	Roman Valiyev	Kazakhstan	16.24	
2nd place, silver medalist(s)	Mohamed Hazouri	Syria	16.20	SB
3rd place, bronze medalist(s)	Yevgeniy Ektov	Kazakhstan	15.93	
4	Nattaporn Nomkanha	Thailand	15.76	SB
5	Kittisak Sukon	Thailand	15.70	PB
6	Warunyou Khongnii	Thailand	15.19	NJR

=== Shot put ===
12 February

Rank	Name	Nation	Result	Notes
1st place, gold medalist(s)	Sarayudh Pinitjit	Thailand	17.49	NR
2nd place, silver medalist(s)	Meshari Suroor Saad	Kuwait	17.29	NJR
3rd place, bronze medalist(s)	Sergey Rubtsov	Kazakhstan	16.89	
4	Sourabh Vij	India	16.88	PB
5	Chatchawal Polyemg	Thailand	16.15	
6	Vansavang Savatdee	Thailand	15.74	PB

=== Heptathlon ===
11–12 February

The highest mark recorded in each event is highlighted in yellow

Rank	Athlete	Nationality	60m	LJ	SP	HJ	60m H	PV	1000m	Points	Notes
1st place, gold medalist(s)	Pavel Dubitskiy	Kazakhstan	7.23	6.99	13.16	2.13	8.54	4.70	2:53.02	5619	SB
2nd place, silver medalist(s)	Hsiao Szu-Pin	Chinese Taipei	7.12	6.82	13.94	2.01	8.40	4.70	2:55.26	5563	NR
3rd place, bronze medalist(s)	Pavel Andreev	Uzbekistan	7.48	6.94	13.77	2.01	8.82	4.80	2:52.40	5421	SB
4	Hiromasa Tanaka	Japan	7.10	6.77	11.69	1.80	8.53	5.00	2:50.97	5340	PB
5	Rifat Artikov	Uzbekistan	7.56	6.08	14.14	1.95	8.62	4.50	2:58.78	5061	SB
6	Meng Hsiang-Tsu	Chinese Taipei	7.39	6.84	10.96	1.95	9.00	4.40	3:08.43	4887	PB
7	Ahmad Hassan Moussa	Qatar	7.39	6.64	13.03	1.71	8.98	3.50	2:54.46	4651	NR
8	Pakawat Hernmek	Thailand	7.55	6.62	11.26	1.65	8.58	4.10	3:04.89	4591	PB
9	Ali Hazer	Lebanon	7.42	5.99	10.66	1.83	8.47	3.30	2:52.46	4539	NR
	Boonkete Chalon	Thailand	7.20	–	–	–	–	–	–	DNF	

== Women's results ==
=== 60 meters ===
Heats – 10 February

Rank	Heat	Name	Nationality	Time	Notes
1	2	Liu Li	China	7.57	Q
2	2	Orranut Klomdee	Thailand	7.60	Q
3	1	Nongnuch Sanrat	Thailand	7.64	Q
3	2	Sangwan Jaksunin	Thailand	7.64	Q
5	1	Wan Kin Yee	Hong Kong	7.77	Q
6	1	Gretta Taslakian	Lebanon	7.82	Q
7	2	Chan Ho Yee	Hong Kong	7.83	q, SB
8	1	Naseem Hameed	Pakistan	7.91	q
9	2	Choo Sze-Min Amanda	Singapore	8.05	NR
10	1	Dzuleqhram Raihan	Singapore	8.08	NR
11	1	Phetsamone Paseuthxay	Laos	8.36	NR
12	1	Sry Hang	Cambodia	8.44	NR
13	2	Sokuentha Kuen	Cambodia	8.69	NJR

Final – 10 February

Rank	Name	Nationality	Time	Notes
1st place, gold medalist(s)	Nongnuch Sanrat	Thailand	7.48	
2nd place, silver medalist(s)	Sangwan Jaksunin	Thailand	7.54	
3rd place, bronze medalist(s)	Orranut Klomdee	Thailand	7.59	SB
4	Liu Li	China	7.61	
5	Wan Kin Yee	Hong Kong	7.75	
6	Chan Ho Yee	Hong Kong	7.89	
7	Gretta Taslakian	Lebanon	7.91	
8	Naseem Hameed	Pakistan	7.93	

=== 400 meters ===
11 February

Rank	Name	Nationality	Time	Notes
1st place, gold medalist(s)	Anna Gavriushenko	Kazakhstan	54.89	
2nd place, silver medalist(s)	Saowalee Kaewchuay	Thailand	55.15	
3rd place, bronze medalist(s)	Marina Ivanova	Kazakhstan	57.26	
4	Treewadee Yongphan	Thailand	57.38	NJR
5	Waeota Khongchan	Thailand	58.32	PB

=== 800 meters ===
Heats – 10 February

Rank	Heat	Name	Nationality	Time	Notes
1	2	Yang Xiaocui	China	2:19.77	Q
2	2	Sinimol Paulose	India	2:21.16	Q
3	2	Vally Michael	Malaysia	2:21.27	q, NR
4	1	Zamira Amirova	Uzbekistan	2:21.47	Q
5	1	Buatip Boonprasert	Thailand	2:21.90	Q
6	2	Viktoriya Yalovtseva	Kazakhstan	2:21.28	q
7	1	Rupinder Kaur	India	2:23.34	PB
8	1	Fathmath Hasma	Maldives	2:37.21	NR

Final – 10 February

Rank	Name	Nationality	Time	Notes
1st place, gold medalist(s)	Zamira Amirova	Uzbekistan	2:07.01	SB
2nd place, silver medalist(s)	Sinimol Paulose	India	2:07.39	SB
3rd place, bronze medalist(s)	Viktoriya Yalovtseva	Kazakhstan	2:08.92	SB
4	Yang Xiaocui	China	2:09.13	SB
5	Buatip Boonprasert	Thailand	2:15.83	
6	Vally Michael	Malaysia	2:23.22	

=== 1500 meters ===
12 February

Rank	Name	Nationality	Time	Notes
1st place, gold medalist(s)	Sinimol Paulose	India	4:18.29	
2nd place, silver medalist(s)	O. P. Jaisha	India	4:18.50	
3rd place, bronze medalist(s)	Svetlana Lukasheva	Kazakhstan	4:19.50	
4	Sun Qiuhong	China	4:35.04	SB
5	Sonthiya Saiweaw	Thailand	5:13.72	NR
6	Fathmath Hasma	Maldives	5:34.68	NR

=== 3000 meters ===
11 February

Rank	Name	Nationality	Time	Notes
1st place, gold medalist(s)	Zhu Xiaolin	China	9:25.60	SB
2nd place, silver medalist(s)	Sun Weiwei	China	9:25.69	PB
3rd place, bronze medalist(s)	O. P. Jaisha	India	9:26.72	NR
4	Kareema Saleh Jasim	Bahrain	9:28.90	NR
5	Preeja Sreedharan	India	9:36.44	SB
6	Rini Budiarti	Indonesia	9:49.75	NR

=== 60 meters hurdles ===
11 February

Rank	Name	Nationality	Time	Notes
1st place, gold medalist(s)	Zhang Rong	China	8.40	SB
2nd place, silver medalist(s)	Natalya Ivoninskaya	Kazakhstan	8.49	
3rd place, bronze medalist(s)	Dedeh Erawati	Indonesia	8.54	NR
4	Liu Jing	China	8.55	SB
5	Leung Shuk Wa	Hong Kong	8.83	PB
6	Wallapa Pansoongneun	Thailand	8.87	
7	Fadwa Al-Boza	Syria	8.94	SB

=== 4 x 400 meters relay ===
12 February

Rank	Nation	Athletes	Time	Notes
1st place, gold medalist(s)	Kazakhstan	Svetlana Lukasheva, Marina Ivanova, Viktoriya Yalovtseva, Anna Gavriushenko	3:41.39	NR
2nd place, silver medalist(s)	Thailand	Yuangjan Panthakarn, Saowalee Kaewchuay, Sunantha Kinnareewong, Wassana Winatho	3:42.28	NR
3rd place, bronze medalist(s)	India	Korda Maridula, Sinimol Paulose, Rupinder Kaur, C. Bhubneshwari	3:53.24	
4	Laos	Phetsamone Paseuthsay, Philaylack Sackpraseuth, Phody Sithideth, Sayloung Inthavong	4:40.97	NR

=== High jump ===
12 February

Rank	Name	Nation	Result	Notes
1st place, gold medalist(s)	Marina Aitova	Kazakhstan	1.93	SB
2nd place, silver medalist(s)	Tatyana Efimenko	Kyrgyzstan	1.91	
2nd place, silver medalist(s)	Svetlana Radzivil	Uzbekistan	1.91	AJR
4	Miyuki Fukumoto	Japan	1.85	=PB
5	Nadiya Dusanova	Uzbekistan	1.78	
6	Gu Xuan	China	1.74	
7	Yuki Mimura	Japan	1.74	NJR

=== Pole vault ===
10 February

Rank	Name	Nation	Result	Notes
1st place, gold medalist(s)	Ikuko Nishikori	Japan	4.20	
2nd place, silver medalist(s)	Mami Nakano	Japan	4.10	
3rd place, bronze medalist(s)	Sun Lei	China	4.00	SB
4	Pasuta Wongwieng	Thailand	3.40	NR

=== Long jump ===
11 February

Rank	Name	Nation	Result	Notes
1st place, gold medalist(s)	Maho Hanaoka	Japan	6.40	SB
2nd place, silver medalist(s)	Anju Bobby George	India	6.32	
3rd place, bronze medalist(s)	Olesya Belyayeva	Kazakhstan	6.29	PB
4	Yuka Sato	Japan	5.91	PB
5	Rima Taha Farid	Jordan	5.85	NR
6	Warunee Kittirihun	Thailand	5.36	

=== Triple jump ===
10 February

Rank	Name	Nation	Result	Notes
1st place, gold medalist(s)	Yelena Parfyonova	Kazakhstan	13.91	NR
2nd place, silver medalist(s)	Olesya Belyayeva	Kazakhstan	13.33	
3rd place, bronze medalist(s)	Thitima Muangjan	Thailand	12.64	

=== Shot put ===
12 February

Rank	Name	Nation	Result	Notes
1st place, gold medalist(s)	Qian Chunhua	China	17.12	SB
2nd place, silver medalist(s)	Juttaporn Krasaeyan	Thailand	15.34	
3rd place, bronze medalist(s)	Hamida Al-Habsi	Oman	9.87	NR

=== Pentathlon ===
10 February

The highest mark recorded in each event is highlighted in yellow

Rank	Athlete	Nationality	60m H	HJ	SP	LJ	800m	Points	Notes
1st place, gold medalist(s)	Olga Rypakova	Kazakhstan	8.68	1.88	12.90	6.55	2:23.26	4582	AR
2nd place, silver medalist(s)	Liu Haili	China	8.54	1.76	12.25	6.18	2:29.35	4220	PB
3rd place, bronze medalist(s)	Amornrat Winatho	Thailand	8.75	1.79	10.99	5.78	2:17.18	4168	NR
4	Yuki Nakata	Japan	8.76	1.70	11.69	5.85	2:23.51	4037	SB
5	Yuliya Tarasova	Uzbekistan	8.84	1.73	12.35	6.05	2:36.00	4004	NR
6	Fadwa Al-Boza	Syria	8.99	1.52	8.97	5.36	2:40.00	3251	NR
