= Indoor athletics at the 2005 Asian Indoor Games =

- Venue: Indoor Athletics Stadium
- Dates: 13–15 November 2005

Indoor athletics at the 2005 Asian Indoor Games was held in Indoor Athletics Stadium, Pattaya, Thailand from 13 November to 15 November 2005.

== Medalists ==
=== Men ===
Event	Gold		Silver		Bronze	
60 m	Tang Yik Chun; Hong Kong	6.80; GR	Wachara Sondee; Thailand	6.83	Juma Al-Jabri; Oman	6.87
400 m	Mohammad Akefian; Iran	47.83; GR	Yevgeniy Meleshenko; Kazakhstan	47.84	Jukkatip Pojaroen; Thailand	48.57
800 m	Ghamanda Ram; India	1:50.69; GR	Salem Amer Al-Badri; Qatar	1:52.27	Mohammad Al-Azemi; Kuwait	1:52.40
1500 m	Thamer Kamal Ali; Qatar	3:50.28; GR	Abubaker Ali Kamal; Qatar	3:50.31	Boonyu Kaveerattanakajon; Thailand	3:57.40
3000 m	Thamer Kamal Ali; Qatar	8:05.03; GR	Boonthung Srisung; Thailand	8:10.39	Abubaker Ali Kamal; Qatar	8:13.24
60 m hurdles	Narongdech Janjai; Thailand	7.93; GR	Abdul Rashid; Pakistan	7.95	Suphan Wongsriphuck; Thailand	8.03
4 × 400 m relay	Thailand; Banjong Lachua; Weera Kongsri; Supachai Phachsay; Narong Nilploy	3:14.11; GR	Iran; Hashem Khazaei; Abolfazl Dehnavi; Amir Piaho; Mohammad Akefian	3:18.81	Qatar; Salaheddine Al-Safi; Abubaker Ali Kamal; Thamer Kamal Ali; Salem Amer Al-Badri	3:21.40
High jump	Sergey Zasimovich; Kazakhstan	2.17; GR	Hu Tong; China	2.15	Torlarp Sudjanta; Thailand	2.15
Pole vault	Artem Pilipenko; Kazakhstan	5.30; GR	Chen Zhong; China	5.10	Mohsen Rabbani; Iran	5.00
Long jump	Roman Valiyev; Kazakhstan	7.84; GR	Saleh Al-Haddad; Kuwait	7.52	Li Runrun; China	7.50
Triple jump	Roman Valiyev; Kazakhstan	16.51; GR	Lin Mujie; China	16.21	Theerayut Philakong; Thailand	15.91
Shot put	Navpreet Singh; India	18.80; GR	Mehdi Shahrokhi; Iran	18.33	Tian Yingchun; China	17.57
Heptathlon	Pavel Dubitskiy; Kazakhstan	5549; GR	Hadi Sepehrzad; Iran	5324	Boonkete Chalon; Thailand	5150

=== Women ===
Event	Gold		Silver		Bronze	
60 m	Nongnuch Sanrat; Thailand	7.46; GR	Sangwan Jaksunin; Thailand	7.49	Zhu Juanhong; China	7.80
400 m	Tatyana Roslanova; Kazakhstan	52.69; GR	Munira Saleh; Syria	54.17	Anna Gavriushenko; Kazakhstan	54.99
800 m	Santhi Soundarajan; India	2:06.07; GR	Huang Jing; China	2:07.32	Viktoriya Yalovtseva; Kazakhstan	2:09.05
1500 m	O. P. Jaisha; India	4:15.75; GR	Svetlana Lukasheva; Kazakhstan	4:16.96	Sinimole Paulose; India	4:18.08
3000 m	O. P. Jaisha; India	9:38.43; GR	Kim Seong-eun; South Korea	9:40.22	Lin Suk-an; North Korea	9:51.72
60 m hurdles	Ji Fangqian; China	8.37; GR	Natalya Ivoninskaya; Kazakhstan	8.41	Trecia Roberts; Thailand	8.56
4 × 400 m relay	India; Iyleen Samantha; Santhi Soundarajan; Mandeep Kaur; Pinki Pramanik	3:46.48; GR	Thailand; Yuangjan Panthakarn; Sunatha Kinareewong; Treewadee Yongphan; Saowalee Kaewchuay	3:48.25	Macau; Cheong Im Wa; Cheng Ka I Lam Oi I Leong Ka Man	4:08.47
High jump	Noengrothai Chaipetch; Thailand	1.88; GR	Anna Ustinova; Kazakhstan	1.84	Gu Biwei; China	1.84
Pole vault	Yang Jing; China	4.31; GR	Sunisa Kaoiad; Thailand	3.40	Shared silver	
Pole vault	Yang Jing; China	4.31; GR	Pasuta Wongwieng; Thailand	3.40	Shared silver	
Long jump	Guan Yingnan; China	6.54; GR	Olesya Belyayeva; Kazakhstan	6.18	Wacharee Ritthiwat; Thailand	5.96
Triple jump	Olesya Belyayeva; Kazakhstan	13.60; GR	Wacharee Ritthiwat; Thailand	13.11	Thitima Muangjan; Thailand	12.95
Shot put	Li Ling; China	18.20; GR	Zhang Guirong; Singapore	17.99	Juttaporn Krasaeyan; Thailand	15.52
Pentathlon	Olga Rypakova; Kazakhstan	3954; GR	Watcharaporn Masim; Thailand	3933	None awarded	

== Medal table ==
Rank	Nation	Gold	Silver	Bronze	Total
1	Kazakhstan (KAZ)	8	5	2	15
2	India (IND)	6	0	1	7
3	Thailand (THA)	4	8	10	22
4	China (CHN)	4	4	4	12
5	Qatar (QAT)	2	2	2	6
6	Iran (IRI)	1	3	1	5
7	Hong Kong (HKG)	1	0	0	1
8	Kuwait (KUW)	0	1	1	2
9	Pakistan (PAK)	0	1	0	1
9	Singapore (SIN)	0	1	0	1
9	South Korea (KOR)	0	1	0	1
9	Syria (SYR)	0	1	0	1
13	Macau (MAC)	0	0	1	1
13	North Korea (PRK)	0	0	1	1
13	Oman (OMA)	0	0	1	1
Totals (15 entries)		26	27	24	77

== Results ==
=== Men ===
==== 60 m ====
13 November

===== 1st round =====
Rank	Athlete	Time
Heat 1
1	Muhammad Imran (PAK)	6.84
2	Wachara Sondee (THA)	6.88
3	Shen Yunbao (CHN)	6.90
4	Lau Yu Leong (HKG)	6.90
5	Mohammad Al-Anezi (KUW)	6.91
6	Park Yeong-hwan (KOR)	7.01
7	Alfred Sim (SIN)	7.27
8	Abdulrahman Al-Suwaidi (UAE)	7.46
Heat 2
1	Ekkachai Janthana (THA)	6.83
2	Eisa Al-Youhah (KUW)	6.85
3	U. K. Shyam (SIN)	6.95
4	Amir Piaho (IRI)	6.98
5	Liang Tse-ching (TPE)	7.07
6	Yousuf Darwish (OMA)	7.11
7	Taha Thabit (YEM)	7.35
8	Chhay Lun (CAM)	7.37
Heat 3
1	Tang Yik Chun (HKG)	6.81
2	Juma Al-Jabri (OMA)	6.84
3	Hossein Ghaemi (IRI)	6.87
4	Wong Wai Ip (MAC)	7.21
5	Chaleunsouk Oudomphanh (LAO)	7.27
6	Ali Shareef (MDV)	7.37
7	Bilal Juma Al-Salfa (UAE)	7.54

===== Final =====
Rank	Athlete	Time
1st place, gold medalist(s)	Tang Yik Chun (HKG)	6.80
2nd place, silver medalist(s)	Wachara Sondee (THA)	6.83
3rd place, bronze medalist(s)	Juma Al-Jabri (OMA)	6.87
4	Shen Yunbao (CHN)	6.89
5	Hossein Ghaemi (IRI)	6.91
6	Ekkachai Janthana (THA)	6.93
7	Muhammad Imran (PAK)	6.95
8	Eisa Al-Youhah (KUW)	6.98

==== 400 m ====
===== 1st round =====
13 November

Rank	Athlete	Time
Heat 1
1	Supachai Phachsay (THA)	48.98
2	Hamid Hassan Ghazwan (UAE)	50.27
3	Taha Thabit (YEM)	51.34
4	Chen Huaming (CHN)	52.09
5	Lai Neng Fong (MAC)	52.41
6	Sauliya Kheuapmavong (LAO)	54.23
Heat 2
1	Yevgeniy Meleshenko (KAZ)	49.08
2	Salaheddine Al-Safi (QAT)	49.41
3	Mohammad Akefian (IRI)	49.42
4	Jukkatip Pojaroen (THA)	49.70
5	Belal Al-Saari (YEM)	53.50
—	Hassan Ghamis Al-Obaid (UAE)	DSQ

===== Final =====
14 November

Rank	Athlete	Time
1st place, gold medalist(s)	Mohammad Akefian (IRI)	47.83
2nd place, silver medalist(s)	Yevgeniy Meleshenko (KAZ)	47.84
3rd place, bronze medalist(s)	Jukkatip Pojaroen (THA)	48.57
4	Supachai Phachsay (THA)	48.71
5	Salaheddine Al-Safi (QAT)	50.24
—	Hamid Hassan Ghazwan (UAE)	DNF

==== 800 m ====
===== 1st round =====
13 November

Rank	Athlete	Time
Heat 1
1	Salem Amer Al-Badri (QAT)	1:57.99
2	Abolfazl Dehnavi (IRI)	1:58.35
3	Patarapong Kewdaeng (THA)	1:58.82
4	Tiêu Kim Hùng (VIE)	1:59.11
5	Edwin Pattileamonia (INA)	1:59.24
6	Chan Hoi Kuan (MAC)	2:12.05
Heat 2
1	Ghamanda Ram (IND)	1:58.23
2	Mohammad Al-Azemi (KUW)	1:58.54
3	Eoh Kyung-don (KOR)	1:59.05
4	Kiattisak Saengchaisri (THA)	1:59.71
5	Belal Al-Saari (YEM)	2:00.91
6	Lei Chi Keong (MAC)	2:12.81

===== Final =====
14 November

Rank	Athlete	Time
1st place, gold medalist(s)	Ghamanda Ram (IND)	1:50.69
2nd place, silver medalist(s)	Salem Amer Al-Badri (QAT)	1:52.27
3rd place, bronze medalist(s)	Mohammad Al-Azemi (KUW)	1:52.40
4	Abolfazl Dehnavi (IRI)	1:53.82
5	Eoh Kyung-don (KOR)	1:56.98
6	Patarapong Kewdaeng (THA)	2:00.23

==== 1500 m ====
15 November

Rank	Athlete	Time
1st place, gold medalist(s)	Thamer Kamal Ali (QAT)	3:50.28
2nd place, silver medalist(s)	Abubaker Ali Kamal (QAT)	3:50.31
3rd place, bronze medalist(s)	Boonyu Kaveerattanakajon (THA)	3:57.40
4	Rouhollah Mohammadi (IRI)	3:57.91
5	Teerachai Rayabsri (THA)	4:05.46
6	Tiêu Kim Hùng (VIE)	4:10.34
7	Saysana Bannavong (LAO)	4:18.17
8	Ieong Chio Wa (MAC)	4:24.88
9	Lam Chi Pang (MAC)	4:51.59

==== 3000 m ====
14 November

Rank	Athlete	Time
1st place, gold medalist(s)	Thamer Kamal Ali (QAT)	8:05.03
2nd place, silver medalist(s)	Boonthung Srisung (THA)	8:10.39
3rd place, bronze medalist(s)	Abubaker Ali Kamal (QAT)	8:13.24
4	Karam Sohrabi (IRI)	8:41.80
5	Amnuay Tongmit (THA)	8:44.45
6	Hei Mauk (MYA)	9:18.27
7	Sayphone Losavanh (LAO)	9:38.37
8	Chan Chan Kit (MAC)	9:50.22
9	Wong Ka Tong (MAC)	10:11.66

==== 60 m hurdles ====
14 November

Rank	Athlete	Time
1st place, gold medalist(s)	Narongdech Janjai (THA)	7.93
2nd place, silver medalist(s)	Abdul Rashid (PAK)	7.95
3rd place, bronze medalist(s)	Suphan Wongsriphuck (THA)	8.03
4	Muhammad Shah (PAK)	8.09
5	Ao Kam Tong (MAC)	9.48
6	Ip Chi Hou (MAC)	9.73

==== 4 × 400 m relay ====
15 November

Rank	Team	Time
1st place, gold medalist(s)	Thailand (THA)	3:14.11
2nd place, silver medalist(s)	Iran (IRI)	3:18.81
3rd place, bronze medalist(s)	Qatar (QAT)	3:21.40
4	Kuwait (KUW)	3:29.53
5	Macau (MAC)	3:32.23

==== High jump ====
13 November

Rank	Athlete	Result
1st place, gold medalist(s)	Sergey Zasimovich (KAZ)	2.17
2nd place, silver medalist(s)	Hu Tong (CHN)	2.15
3rd place, bronze medalist(s)	Torlarp Sudjanta (THA)	2.15
4	Amin Hosseinzadeh Rahbar (IRI)	2.08
4	Suchart Singhaklang (THA)	2.08
6	Oh Jin-wuk (KOR)	1.95
7	Choi Hong Fai (MAC)	1.80
—	Chan Weng U (MAC)	NM

==== Pole vault ====
13 November

Rank	Athlete	Result
1st place, gold medalist(s)	Artem Pilipenko (KAZ)	5.30
2nd place, silver medalist(s)	Chen Zhong (CHN)	5.10
3rd place, bronze medalist(s)	Mohsen Rabbani (IRI)	5.00
4	Kim Do-kyun (KOR)	4.75
5	Pichitpol Singthonghom (THA)	4.60
—	Amnat Kunpadit (THA)	NM

==== Long jump ====
13 November

Rank	Athlete	Result
1st place, gold medalist(s)	Roman Valiyev (KAZ)	7.84
2nd place, silver medalist(s)	Saleh Al-Haddad (KUW)	7.52
3rd place, bronze medalist(s)	Li Runrun (CHN)	7.50
4	Maha Singh (IND)	7.49
5	Mohammad Arzandeh (IRI)	7.32
6	Kittisak Sukon (THA)	7.27
7	Hamid Reza Abolhassani (IRI)	7.18
8	Vũ Văn Quý (VIE)	7.07
9	Kenneth Wang (SIN)	6.83
10	Ngô Hà Phương (VIE)	6.80
11	Thaworn Yailert (THA)	6.80
—	Konstantin Safronov (KAZ)	NM

==== Triple jump ====
15 November

Rank	Athlete	Result
1st place, gold medalist(s)	Roman Valiyev (KAZ)	16.51
2nd place, silver medalist(s)	Lin Mujie (CHN)	16.21
3rd place, bronze medalist(s)	Theerayut Philakong (THA)	15.91
4	Nattaporn Namkanha (THA)	15.68
5	Hamid Reza Abolhassani (IRI)	15.26
6	Đặng Hoàng Minh (VIE)	15.15
7	Si Kuan Wong (MAC)	14.31
8	Tam Chan Keong (MAC)	13.12

==== Shot put ====
15 November

Rank	Athlete	Result
1st place, gold medalist(s)	Navpreet Singh (IND)	18.80
2nd place, silver medalist(s)	Mehdi Shahrokhi (IRI)	18.33
3rd place, bronze medalist(s)	Tian Yingchun (CHN)	17.57
4	Kim Jae-il (KOR)	17.33
5	Mashari Suroor (KUW)	17.21
6	Sergey Rubtsov (KAZ)	17.09
7	Amir Alvand (IRI)	17.04
8	Chatchawal Polyiam (THA)	16.96
9	Ashraf Ali (PAK)	16.52
10	Sarayudh Pinitjit (THA)	16.39
11	Dong Enxin (SIN)	14.33
12	Ma Kam Cheong (MAC)	12.49
13	Mohammed Al-Badwi (YEM)	10.93
14	Hou Fei (MAC)	9.94

==== Heptathlon ====
14–15 November

Rank	Athlete	60M	Long jump	Shot put	High jump	60M hurdles	Pole vault	1000M	Total
1st place, gold medalist(s)	Pavel Dubitskiy (KAZ)	7.24; 799	7.00; 814	13.02; 668	2.10; 896	8.48; 865	4.70; 819	2:57.55; 688	5549
2nd place, silver medalist(s)	Hadi Sepehrzad (IRI)	7.03; 872	6.79; 764	16.03; 853	1.86; 679	8.32; 903	3.90; 590	3:00.11; 663	5324
3rd place, bronze medalist(s)	Boonkete Chalon (THA)	7.11; 844	6.91; 792	12.13; 614	1.80; 627	8.50; 860	4.10; 645	2:49.78; 768	5150
4	Viravut Jumpatong (THA)	7.33; 769	6.93; 797	12.11; 613	1.95; 758	8.73; 806	3.90; 590	3:16.90; 508	4841
—	Ali Feizi (IRI)	7.35; 762	6.54; 707	14.12; 736	1.92; 731	8.86; 777	NM; 0	DNS	DNF

=== Women ===
==== 60 m ====
13 November

===== 1st round =====
Rank	Athlete	Time
Heat 1
1	Sangwan Jaksunin (THA)	7.50
2	Zhu Juanhong (CHN)	7.64
3	Yu Sheue-an (TPE)	7.79
4	Naseem Hameed (PAK)	7.83
5	Ieong Loi (MAC)	7.98
Heat 2
1	Nongnuch Sanrat (THA)	7.54
2	Wan Kin Yee (HKG)	7.72
3	Kim Ha-na (KOR)	7.74
4	Lai Choi Lok (MAC)	8.03
5	Jauna Nafiz (MDV)	8.38

===== Final =====
Rank	Athlete	Time
1st place, gold medalist(s)	Nongnuch Sanrat (THA)	7.46
2nd place, silver medalist(s)	Sangwan Jaksunin (THA)	7.49
3rd place, bronze medalist(s)	Zhu Juanhong (CHN)	7.80
4	Wan Kin Yee (HKG)	7.91
5	Yu Sheue-an (TPE)	7.93
6	Kim Ha-na (KOR)	7.94
7	Naseem Hameed (PAK)	7.99
8	Ieong Loi (MAC)	8.02

==== 400 m ====
===== 1st round =====
13 November

Rank	Athlete	Time
Heat 1
1	Tatyana Roslanova (KAZ)	53.29
2	Pinki Pramanik (IND)	53.89
3	Bushra Parveen (PAK)	57.75
4	Yupaporn Yachaisri (THA)	58.21
5	Liu Li (CHN)	1:01.71
6	Cheong Im Wa (MAC)	1:02.01
Heat 2
1	Anna Gavriushenko (KAZ)	54.63
2	Munira Saleh (SYR)	54.85
3	Saowalee Kaewchuay (THA)	55.29
4	Herlince Tatogo (INA)	57.01
5	Mandeep Kaur (IND)	58.99
6	Lam Oi I (MAC)	1:04.69

===== Final =====
14 November

Rank	Athlete	Time
1st place, gold medalist(s)	Tatyana Roslanova (KAZ)	52.69
2nd place, silver medalist(s)	Munira Saleh (SYR)	54.17
3rd place, bronze medalist(s)	Anna Gavriushenko (KAZ)	54.99
4	Saowalee Kaewchuay (THA)	55.01
5	Herlince Tatogo (INA)	57.64
—	Pinki Pramanik (IND)	DNF

==== 800 m ====
===== 1st round =====
13 November

Rank	Athlete	Time
Heat 1
1	Pinki Pramanik (IND)	2:09.39
2	Huang Jing (CHN)	2:10.37
3	Toe Ni Ni (MYA)	2:20.21
4	Cheng Ka I (MAC)	2:32.19
Heat 2
1	Santhi Soundarajan (IND)	2:11.08
2	Viktoriya Yalovtseva (KAZ)	2:11.24
3	Buatip Boonprasert (THA)	2:12.60
4	Gulnaz Ara (PAK)	2:14.56
5	Leong Ka Man (MAC)	2:29.10

===== Final =====
14 November

Rank	Athlete	Time
1st place, gold medalist(s)	Santhi Soundarajan (IND)	2:06.07
2nd place, silver medalist(s)	Huang Jing (CHN)	2:07.32
3rd place, bronze medalist(s)	Viktoriya Yalovtseva (KAZ)	2:09.05
4	Buatip Boonprasert (THA)	2:12.17
5	Gulnaz Ara (PAK)	2:12.25
—	Pinki Pramanik (IND)	DSQ

==== 1500 m ====
15 November

Rank	Athlete	Time
1st place, gold medalist(s)	O. P. Jaisha (IND)	4:15.75
2nd place, silver medalist(s)	Svetlana Lukasheva (KAZ)	4:16.96
3rd place, bronze medalist(s)	Sinimole Paulose (IND)	4:18.08
4	Leila Ebrahimi (IRI)	4:34.18
5	Hyang Ran-yun (PRK)	4:36.64
6	Mina Pourseifi (IRI)	4:49.82
7	Toe Ni Ni (MYA)	4:57.61

==== 3000 m ====
13 November

Rank	Athlete	Time
1st place, gold medalist(s)	O. P. Jaisha (IND)	9:38.43
2nd place, silver medalist(s)	Kim Seong-eun (KOR)	9:40.22
3rd place, bronze medalist(s)	Lin Suk-an (PRK)	9:51.72
4	Sinimole Paulose (IND)	9:55.60
5	Leila Ebrahimi (IRI)	10:08.90
6	Sonthiya Saiwaew (THA)	10:32.84
7	Nirmala Bharti (NEP)	10:33.77
8	Mina Pourseifi (IRI)	10:40.01

==== 60 m hurdles ====
14 November

Rank	Athlete	Time
1st place, gold medalist(s)	Ji Fangqian (CHN)	8.37
2nd place, silver medalist(s)	Natalya Ivoninskaya (KAZ)	8.41
3rd place, bronze medalist(s)	Trecia Roberts (THA)	8.56
4	Wallapa Pansoongneun (THA)	8.79
5	Jung Hye-lim (KOR)	8.81

==== 4 × 400 m relay ====
15 November

Rank	Team	Time
1st place, gold medalist(s)	India (IND)	3:46.48
2nd place, silver medalist(s)	Thailand (THA)	3:48.25
3rd place, bronze medalist(s)	Macau (MAC)	4:08.47
—	Kazakhstan (KAZ)	DSQ

==== High jump ====
15 November

Rank	Athlete	Result
1st place, gold medalist(s)	Noengrothai Chaipetch (THA)	1.88
2nd place, silver medalist(s)	Anna Ustinova (KAZ)	1.84
3rd place, bronze medalist(s)	Gu Biwei (CHN)	1.84
4	Netnapa Thaiking (THA)	1.80
5	Yun Myong-ja (KOR)	1.70

==== Pole vault ====
14 November

Rank	Athlete	Result
1st place, gold medalist(s)	Yang Jing (CHN)	4.31
2nd place, silver medalist(s)	Sunisa Kaoiad (THA)	3.40
2nd place, silver medalist(s)	Pasuta Wongwieng (THA)	3.40
4	Sundari (INA)	3.20

==== Long jump ====
15 November

Rank	Athlete	Result
1st place, gold medalist(s)	Guan Yingnan (CHN)	6.54
2nd place, silver medalist(s)	Olesya Belyayeva (KAZ)	6.18
3rd place, bronze medalist(s)	Wacharee Ritthiwat (THA)	5.96
4	Trần Thị Ngọc Phương (VIE)	5.71
5	Warunee Kittirihun (THA)	5.66
6	Chan Wai Lan (MAC)	4.88

==== Triple jump ====
13 November

Rank	Athlete	Result
1st place, gold medalist(s)	Olesya Belyayeva (KAZ)	13.60
2nd place, silver medalist(s)	Wacharee Ritthiwat (THA)	13.11
3rd place, bronze medalist(s)	Thitima Muangjan (THA)	12.95
4	Qiu Huijing (CHN)	12.77
5	Bùi Thị Nhật Thanh (VIE)	12.61

==== Shot put ====
15 November

Rank	Athlete	Result
1st place, gold medalist(s)	Li Ling (CHN)	18.20
2nd place, silver medalist(s)	Zhang Guirong (SIN)	17.99
3rd place, bronze medalist(s)	Juttaporn Krasaeyan (THA)	15.52
4	Zeenat Parveen (PAK)	14.03
5	Wong Kit Man (MAC)	12.31

==== Pentathlon ====
13 November

Rank	Athlete	60M hurdles	High jump	Shot put	Long jump	800M	Total
1st place, gold medalist(s)	Olga Rypakova (KAZ)	8.67; 980	1.86; 1054	12.49; 694	4.82; 511	2:28.22; 715	3954
2nd place, silver medalist(s)	Watcharaporn Masim (THA)	8.80; 952	1.74; 903	12.23; 676	5.66; 747	2:33.07; 655	3933
