= 2005 Asian Athletics Championships – Women's 800 metres =

The women's 800 metres event at the 2005 Asian Athletics Championships was held in Incheon, South Korea on September 3–4.

== Medalists ==
Gold	Silver	Bronze
Miho Sato; Japan	Zamira Amirova; Uzbekistan	Ayako Jinnouchi; Japan

== Results ==
=== Heats ===
Rank	Heat	Name	Nationality	Time	Notes
1	2	Ayako Jinnouchi	Japan	2:07.23	Q
2	2	Sinimole Paulose	India	2:07.27	Q
3	2	Zamira Amirova	Uzbekistan	2:07.34	Q
4	2	Do Thi Bong	Vietnam	2:07.43	q
5	2	Viktoriya Yalovtseva	Kazakhstan	2:08.96	q
6	1	Miho Sato	Japan	2:10.12	Q
7	1	Liu Xiaoping	China	2:10.41	Q
8	1	Truong Thanh Hang	Vietnam	2:10.54	
9	1	Mangala Priyadharshani	Sri Lanka	2:11.15	
10	1	Vally Michael	Malaysia	2:11.72	
11	2	Huh Yeon-Jung	South Korea	2:14.07	
12	2	Imane Mounir Al-Jallad	Syria	2:16.36	
13	1	Rasha Abed Yaseen	Iraq	2:38.16	PB
	1	Santhi Soundarajan	India	DQ	Q

=== Final ===
Rank	Name	Nationality	Time	Notes
1st place, gold medalist(s)	Miho Sato	Japan	2:01.84	
2nd place, silver medalist(s)	Zamira Amirova	Uzbekistan	2:04.22	SB
3rd place, bronze medalist(s)	Ayako Jinnouchi	Japan	2:05.69	
4	Viktoriya Yalovtseva	Kazakhstan	2:07.18	
5	Do Thi Bong	Vietnam	2:07.31	
6	Sinimole Paulose	India	2:09.73	
7	Liu Xiaoping	China	2:12.86	
	Santhi Soundarajan	India	DQ	

Note: Santhi Soundarajan originally finished second with 2:04.01 but was later disqualified after failing a gender verification test.
