= Athletics at the 2006 Asian Games – Women's 800 metres =

Women's 800 metres at the 2006 Asian Games
- Venue: Khalifa International Stadium
- Dates: 8–9 December 2006
- Competitors: 17 from 13 nations

Medalists
gold medal	Maryam Yusuf Jamal	Bahrain
silver medal	Viktoriya Yalovtseva	Kazakhstan
bronze medal	Zamira Amirova	Uzbekistan

The women's 800 metres competition at the 2006 Asian Games in Doha, Qatar was held on 8 and 9 December 2006 at the Khalifa International Stadium.

== Schedule ==
All times are Arabia Standard Time (UTC+03:00)

Date	Time	Event
Friday, 8 December 2006	16:05	1st round
Saturday, 9 December 2006	16:30	Final

== Records ==
Prior to this competition, the existing world, Asian and Games records were as follows.

World Record	Jarmila Kratochvílová (TCH)	1:53.28	Munich, West Germany	26 July 1983
Asian Record	Liu Dong (CHN)	1:55.54	Beijing, China	9 September 1993
Games Record	Qu Yunxia (CHN)	1:59.85	Hiroshima, Japan	12 October 1994

== Results ==
Legend

- DNF — Did not finish

=== 1st round ===
- Qualification: First 2 in each heat (Q) and the next 2 fastest (q) advance to the final.

==== Heat 1 ====
Rank	Athlete	Time	Notes
1	Santhi Soundarajan (IND)	~~2:08.62~~	Q
2	Đỗ Thị Bông (VIE)	2:08.64	Q
3	Miho Sugimori (JPN)	2:08.69	q
4	Anna Kliushkina (KGZ)	2:09.31	
5	Sanna Abubkheet (PLE)	2:31.50	
6	Danah Al-Nasrallah (KUW)	2:40.60	

==== Heat 2 ====
Rank	Athlete	Time	Notes
1	Maryam Yusuf Jamal (BRN)	2:08.87	Q
2	Sinimole Paulose (IND)	2:10.16	Q
3	Trương Thanh Hằng (VIE)	2:10.95	
4	Leila Ebrahimi (IRI)	2:17.16	
—	Tatyana Borisova (KGZ)	DNF	

==== Heat 3 ====
Rank	Athlete	Time	Notes
1	Viktoriya Yalovtseva (KAZ)	2:04.70	Q
2	Zamira Amirova (UZB)	2:06.57	Q
3	Liu Qing (CHN)	2:07.34	q
4	Bushra Parveen (PAK)	2:15.17	
5	Mina Pourseifi (IRI)	2:18.35	
6	Leong Ka Man (MAC)	2:26.51	

=== Final ===
Rank	Athlete	Time	Notes
1st place, gold medalist(s)	Maryam Yusuf Jamal (BRN)	2:01.79	
2nd place, silver medalist(s)	Viktoriya Yalovtseva (KAZ)	2:03.19	
3rd place, bronze medalist(s)	Zamira Amirova (UZB)	2:03.56	
4	Sinimole Paulose (IND)	2:03.76	
5	Miho Sugimori (JPN)	2:05.28	
6	Đỗ Thị Bông (VIE)	2:07.75	
7	Liu Qing (CHN)	2:09.39	
DQ	Santhi Soundarajan (IND)	~~2:03.16~~	

- Santhi Soundarajan of India originally won the silver medal, but she was disqualified after a sex test indicated that she "does not possess the sexual characteristics of a woman".
