= Athletics at the 2013 SEA Games – Women's 3000 metres steeplechase =

The women's 3000 metres steeplechase was part of the athletics events at the 2013 SEA Games held in Naypyidaw, Myanmar. The track and field event took place at the Wunna Theikdi Stadiumon December 18.

== Schedule ==
All times are Myanmar Standard Time (UTC+06:30)

Date	Time	Event
Wednesday, 18 December 2013	16:00	Final

== Records ==
Prior to this competition, the existing world, Asian, and Southeast Asian Games records were as follows.

World Record	Gulnara Samitova-Galkina (RUS)	8:58.81	Beijing, China	17 August 2008
Asian Record	Liu Nian (CHN)	9:26.25	Wuhan, China	2 November 2007
Games Record	Rini Budiarti (INA)	10:00.58	Palembang, Indonesia	12 November 2011

== Results ==
Legend

Rank	Athlete	Time	Notes
1st place, gold medalist(s)	Rini Budiarti (INA)	10:04.54	
2nd place, silver medalist(s)	Nguyễn Thi Oanh (VIE)	10:30.92	
3rd place, bronze medalist(s)	Jessica Barnard (PHI)	11:04.84	NR
4	Than Toe Khin Myo Aung (MYA)	11:16.49	NR
5	Khin Mar Sal (MYA)	11:53.15	
—	Nguyen Thi Phuong (VIE)	DNS	
