= Athletics at the 2015 SEA Games – Women's 5000 metres =

The women's 5000 metres at the 2015 SEA Games was held in National Stadium, Singapore. The track and field events took place on June 9.

== Schedule ==
All times are (UTC+08:00)

Date	Time	Event
Tuesday, 9 June 2015	17:05	Final

== Records ==
Prior to this competition, the existing world, Asian, and Southeast Asian Games records were as follows.

World Record	Tirunesh Dibaba (ETH)	14:11.15	Oslo, Norway	6 June 2008
Asian Record	Jiang Bo (CHN)	14:28.09	Shanghai, China	23 October 1997
Games Record	Triyaningsih (INA)	15:54.32	Nakhon Ratchasima, Thailand	8 December 2007

== Results ==
Legend

- SB — Seasonal Best
- PB — Personal Best

Rank	Athlete	Time	Note
1st place, gold medalist(s)	Triyaningsih (INA)	16:18.06	SB
2nd place, silver medalist(s)	Rini Budiarti (INA)	16:30.85	
3rd place, bronze medalist(s)	Phyu War Thet (MYA)	16:54.71	
4	Pham Thi Hue (VIE)	17:25.97	
5	Truong Thi Thuy Kieu (VIE)	17:49.91	
6	Pa Pa (MYA)	17:58.36	
7	Lodkeo Inthakoumman (LAO)	17:58.61	
8	Suneeka Prichaprong (THA)	18:06.27	PB
9	Nelia Martins (TLS)	19:11.00	
10	Qua Bi Qi (SIN)	19:42.50	
