= 2002 Asian Athletics Championships – Women's 400 metres =

The women's 400 metres event at the 2002 Asian Athletics Championships was held in Colombo, Sri Lanka on 9–10 August.

== Medalists ==
| Gold | Silver | Bronze |
|---|---|---|
| Tatyana Khadjimuratova; Kazakhstan | Zamira Amirova; Uzbekistan | Nguyen Thi Tinh; Vietnam |

== Results ==
=== Heats ===
| Rank | Heat | Name | Nationality | Time | Notes |
|---|---|---|---|---|---|
| 1 | 1 | Tatyana Khadjimuratova | Kazakhstan | 52.62 | Q |
| 2 | 1 | Mayu Sato | Japan | 54.17 | Q |
| 2 | 2 | Makiko Yoshida | Japan | 54.17 | Q |
| 4 | 1 | Zamira Amirova | Uzbekistan | 54.19 | Q |
| 5 | 2 | Nguyen Thi Tinh | Vietnam | 54.82 | Q |
| 6 | 1 | Sagardeep Kaur | India | 54.97 | q |
| 7 | 2 | Alyona Litvinova | Turkmenistan | 55.48 | Q |
| 8 | 2 | K.L.L. Gunawardana | Sri Lanka | 56.00 | q |
| 9 | 1 | Menike Wickramasinghe | Sri Lanka | 56.46 | |
| 10 | 3 | Edirisinghe Swarnamali | Sri Lanka | 56.95 | PB |
| 11 | 1 | Diala Al Chabi | Lebanon | 57.20 | |
| 12 | 2 | Lee Yun-Kyong | South Korea | 57.46 | |
| | 1 | Bushra Parveen | Pakistan | DNS | |

=== Final ===
| Rank | Name | Nationality | Time | Notes |
|---|---|---|---|---|
| 1st place, gold medalist(s) | Tatyana Khadjimuratova | Kazakhstan | 52.61 | |
| 2nd place, silver medalist(s) | Zamira Amirova | Uzbekistan | 53.87 | |
| 3rd place, bronze medalist(s) | Nguyen Thi Tinh | Vietnam | 54.57 | |
| 4 | Makiko Yoshida | Japan | 54.67 | |
| 5 | Mayu Sato | Japan | 54.69 | |
| 6 | Sagardeep Kaur | India | 55.35 | |
| 7 | K.L.L. Gunawardana | Sri Lanka | 55.96 | PB |
| | Alyona Litvinova | Turkmenistan | DNS | |
