= Athletics at the 2003 Summer Universiade – Women's long jump =

The women's long jump event at the 2003 Summer Universiade was held on 26 and 27 August 2003 in Daegu, South Korea.

== Medalists ==
Gold	Silver	Bronze
Irina Simagina; Russia	Alina Militaru; Romania	Zita Ajkler; Hungary

== Results ==
=== Qualification ===
Rank	Group	Athlete	Nationality	#1	#2	#3	Result	Notes
1	A	Alina Militaru	Romania				6.56	Q
2	A	Irina Simagina	Russia				6.41	Q
3	A	Kerrie Perkins	Australia				6.25	Q
4	A	Yuliya Akulenko	Ukraine				6.24	Q
5	A	Nataliya Sorokina	Ukraine				6.18	Q
6	B	Jana Velďáková	Slovakia				6.17	Q
7	A	Tina Čarman	Slovenia				6.16	Q
8	A	Zita Ajkler	Hungary				6.16	Q
8	B	Wacharee Rittiwat	Thailand				6.16	Q
10	A	Iryna Charnushenka	Belarus				6.13	Q
11	A	Lucie Komrsková	Czech Republic				6.09	Q
11	B	Joséphine Mbarga-Bikié	Cameroon				6.09	Q
13	A	Sirkka-Liisa Kivine	Estonia				6.08	
14	B	Jung Soon-ok	South Korea				5.96	
15	B	Živilė Šikšnelytė	Lithuania	5.72	5.94	x	5.94	
16	A	Naide Gomes	Portugal				5.86	
17	A	Shermin Oksuz	Australia				5.84	
18	B	Mei Ngew Sin	Malaysia				5.84	
19	B	Sabrina Asturias	Guatemala	5.55	x	5.13	5.55	
20	A	Liana Hovhannisyan	Armenia				5.53	
	B	Yuridia Bustamante	Mexico	x	x	x	NM	

=== Final ===
Rank	Athlete	Nationality	#1	#2	#3	#4	#5	#6	Result	Notes
1st place, gold medalist(s)	Irina Simagina	Russia	6.44	6.06	6.45	6.49	x	x	6.49	
2nd place, silver medalist(s)	Alina Militaru	Romania	6.45	6.40	x	x	6.35	6.29	6.45	
3rd place, bronze medalist(s)	Zita Ajkler	Hungary	5.89	6.20	6.27	6.37	6.28	6.38	6.38	
4	Kerrie Perkins	Australia	6.25	6.30	6.32	6.20	6.37	6.32	6.37	
5	Wacharee Rittiwat	Thailand	6.20	x	6.04	x	6.31	x	6.31	
6	Nataliya Sorokina	Ukraine	6.24	x	6.18	6.22	x	6.24	6.24	
7	Tina Čarman	Slovenia	6.07	x	6.21	x	x	6.05	6.21	
8	Jana Velďáková	Slovakia	x	6.05	6.17	4.18	x	3.81	6.17	
9	Yuliya Akulenko	Ukraine	6.16	6.10	x				6.16	
10	Lucie Komrsková	Czech Republic	6.06	x	x				6.06	
11	Iryna Charnushenka	Belarus	5.96	x	5.95				5.96	
12	Joséphine Mbarga-Bikié	Cameroon	5.42	5.59	5.65				5.65	
