= 2003 Asian Athletics Championships – Women's 800 metres =

The women's 800 metres event at the 2003 Asian Athletics Championships was held in Manila, Philippines on September 22–23.

== Medalists ==
Gold	Silver	Bronze
Yin Yin Khine; Myanmar	Tatyana Khadjimuratova; Kazakhstan	Zamira Amirova; Uzbekistan

== Results ==
=== Heats ===
Rank	Heat	Name	Nationality	Time	Notes
1	1	Tatyana Khadjimuratova	Kazakhstan	2:05.37	Q
2	1	Liu Xiaoping	China	2:06.15	Q
3	1	Yin Yin Khine	Myanmar	2:06.17	Q
4	1	Sunita Kanojia	India	2:06.70	q
5	2	Madhuri Singh	India	2:09.31	Q
6	2	Zamira Amirova	Uzbekistan	2:09.46	Q
7	2	Mangala Priyadharshani	Sri Lanka	2:09.68	Q
8	2	Svetlana Lukasheva	Kazakhstan	2:10.78	q
9	2	Chise Miyazaki	Japan	2:13.77	
10	1	Gulnaz Ara	Pakistan	2:15.58	
11	1	Buathip Boonprasert	Thailand	2:18.19	SB

=== Final ===
Rank	Name	Nationality	Time	Notes
1st place, gold medalist(s)	Yin Yin Khine	Myanmar	2:01.96	NR
2nd place, silver medalist(s)	Tatyana Khadjimuratova	Kazakhstan	2:02.41	
3rd place, bronze medalist(s)	Zamira Amirova	Uzbekistan	2:02.84	
4	Madhuri Singh	India	2:03.48	SB
5	Svetlana Lukasheva	Kazakhstan	2:05.31	
6	Liu Xiaoping	China	2:06.64	
7	Mangala Priyadharshani	Sri Lanka	2:08.50	
	Sunita Kanojia	India	DNF	
