= Wacharee Ritthiwat =

Thai athletics competitor

Personal information
- Nationality: Thailand
- Born: 18 October 1976 (age 49)

Sport
- Sport: Athletics
- Event(s): Long jump, Triple jump

Wacharee Ritthiwat (born 18 October 1976) is a Thai former long jump and triple jump athlete.

In the triple jump she finished fourteenth at the 1998 Asian Games, ninth at the 2002 Asian Games, fourth at the 2003 Asian Championships, won the silver medal at the 2005 Asian Indoor Games and finished eighth at the 2005 Asian Championships. On the regional scene she won the gold medal at the 1995, 1997, 2001 and 2003 Southeast Asian Games.

In the long jump she finished seventh at the 2003 Asian Championships won the bronze medal at the 2005 Asian Indoor Games and finished fifth at the 2003 Summer Universiade.

Her personal best triple jump is 13.78 metres, achieved in August 2001 in Singapore. Her personal best long jump is 6.36 metres, achieved in May 2002 in Bangkok. 6.36 is the Thai record.
