= Myint Myint Aye =

Burmese middle-distance runner (born 1977)

Myint Myint Aye (born 18 November 1977) is a retired athlete who represented Myanmar in the middle-distance events. She competed in the 800 metres at two World Championships, in 2003 and 2005, without qualifying for the semifinals.

== Competition record ==
Year	Competition	Venue	Position	Event	Notes
Representing Myanmar
2002	Asian Championships	Colombo, Sri Lanka	4th	800 m	2:06.07
2002	Asian Championships	Colombo, Sri Lanka	5th	1500 m	4:22.73
2003	World Championships	Paris, France	33rd (h)	800 m	2:05.41
2003	Southeast Asian Games	Hanoi, Vietnam	3rd	800 m	2:12.73
2003	Southeast Asian Games	Hanoi, Vietnam	2nd	4 × 400 m relay	3:43.66
2005	World Championships	Helsinki, Finland	32nd (h)	800 m	2:08.50
2005	Southeast Asian Games	Malate, Philippines	1st	4 × 400 m relay	3:35.68
2007	Southeast Asian Games	Nakhon Ratchasima, Thailand	3rd	800 m	2:08.03
2007	Southeast Asian Games	Nakhon Ratchasima, Thailand	2nd	4 × 400 m relay	3:40.60

== Personal bests ==
- 400 metres – 56.9h (Yangon 2008)
- 800 metres – 2:01.80 (Yangon 2005) NR
- 1500 metres – 4:18.71 (Singapore 2004)
