= Tatyana Roslanova =

Kazakhstani runner (born 1980)

Medal record

Women's athletics

Representing Kazakhstan

Asian Championships
Gold medal – first place	2002 Colombo	400 m
Silver medal – second place	2003 Manila	800 m
Silver medal – second place	2003 Manila	4×400 m
Silver medal – second place	2005 Incheon	4×400 m
Bronze medal – third place	2007 Amman	4×400 m

Asian Indoor Championships
Gold medal – first place	2004 Tehran	400 m

Tatyana Leonidovna Roslanova (née Khajimuradova; born 28 September 1980) is a Kazakhstani runner who specializes in the 400 and 800 metres.

== Achievements ==
Year	Competition	Venue	Position	Event	Notes
Representing Kazakhstan
2002	Asian Championships	Colombo, Sri Lanka	1st	400 m	52.61
2002	World Cup	Madrid, Spain	7th	400 m	52.44
2002	World Cup	Madrid, Spain	9th	4 × 400 m relay	3:37.18
2002	Asian Games	Busan, South Korea	7th	400 m	54.44
2002	Asian Games	Busan, South Korea	2nd	4 × 400 m relay	3:31.72
2003	World Championships	Paris, France	36th (h)	800 m	2:07.98
2003	World Championships	Paris, France	12th (h)	4 × 400 m relay	DNF
2003	Asian Championships	Manila, Philippines	2nd	800 m	2:02.41
2003	Afro-Asian Games	Hyderabad, India	4th	400 m	53.89
2003	Afro-Asian Games	Hyderabad, India	3rd	4 × 400 m relay	3:32.41
2004	Asian Indoor Championships	Tehran, Iran	1st	400 m	54.46
2004	Olympic Games	Daegu, South Korea	35th (h)	800 m	2:06.39
2005	Asian Championships	Incheon, South Korea	4th	400 m	52.96
2005	Asian Championships	Incheon, South Korea	2nd	4 × 400 m relay	3:32.61
2005	Universiade	İzmir, Turkey	3rd	400 m	52.46
2005	Universiade	İzmir, Turkey	6th	4 × 400 m relay	3:32.83
2005	Asian Indoor Games	Bangkok, Thailand	1st	400 m	52.69
2007	Asian Championships	Amman, Jordan	3rd	4 × 400 m relay	3:50.81
2007	Asian Indoor Games	Macau	1st	4 × 400 m relay	3:37.59
2011	World Championships	Daegu, South Korea	–	4 × 400 m relay	DNF

=== Personal bests ===
- 400 metres – 50.68 s (2004)
- 800 metres – 1:59.50 min (2004)
