= Athletics at the 2005 Summer Universiade – Women's 400 metres =

The women's 400 metres event at the 2005 Summer Universiade was held on 15–17 August in İzmir, Turkey.

The winning margin was 0.02 seconds which as of 2024 remains the narrowest winning margin for the women's 400 metres at these games.

== Medalists ==
Gold	Silver	Bronze
Natalya Nazarova; Russia	Fatou Bintou Fall; Senegal	Tatyana Khadjimuratova; Kazakhstan

== Results ==
=== Heats ===
Rank	Heat	Athlete	Nationality	Time	Notes
1	5	Tatyana Khadjimuratova	Kazakhstan	53.11	Q
2	4	Yelena Migunova	Russia	53.62	Q
3	1	Asami Tanno	Japan	53.63	Q
4	3	Natalya Nazarova	Russia	53.67	Q
5	1	Lisa Miller	Great Britain	53.97	Q
6	1	Olha Zavhorodnya	Ukraine	54.10	Q
7	5	Iryna Khliustava	Belarus	54.18	Q
8	2	Martina Näf	Switzerland	54.21	Q
9	2	Kirsi Mykkänen	Finland	54.51	Q
10	4	Lorena de Oliveira	Brazil	54.57	Q
11	4	Anna Gavriushenko	Kazakhstan	54.62	Q
12	5	Fatou Bintou Fall	Senegal	54.63	Q
13	2	Jūratė Stanislovaitienė	Lithuania	54.74	Q
14	3	Magali Yáñez	Mexico	54.92	Q
15	4	Joanne Cuddihy	Ireland	55.28	Q
16	2	Patrícia Lopes	Portugal	55.33	Q
17	2	Elaine McCaffrey	Ireland	55.50	q
18	1	Pınar Saka	Turkey	55.68	Q
19	2	Vaya Vladeva	Bulgaria	56.19	q
20	3	Zhong Zhen	China	56.46	Q
21	4	An Ning	China	57.19	q
22	3	Martine Cloutier-LeBlanc	Canada	57.23	Q
23	1	Charlotte Osborne	New Zealand	57.43	q
24	2	Herlince Tatogo	Indonesia	57.48	
25	5	Suraporn Loulert	Thailand	58.41	Q
26	4	Tianasom Rasdanirainy	Madagascar	1:01.02	
27	5	Hoi Wai Kuan	Macau	1:01.29	
28	3	Mariluz Obono	Equatorial Guinea	1:06.00	
29	4	Mukasami Mwanangombe	Zambia	1:14.40	
	1	Yulyana Zhalniaruk	Belarus	DNS	
	3	Theodosia Nakopoulou	Greece	DNS	
	5	Mariana Dimitrova	Bulgaria	DNS	
	5	Melissa Moraga	Costa Rica	DNS	
	5	Mari Järvenpää	Finland	DNS	

=== Semifinals ===
Rank	Heat	Athlete	Nationality	Time	Notes
1	3	Fatou Bintou Fall	Senegal	52.36	Q
2	3	Tatyana Khadjimuratova	Kazakhstan	52.45	Q
3	2	Natalya Nazarova	Russia	52.53	Q
4	2	Asami Tanno	Japan	53.23	Q
5	1	Yelena Migunova	Russia	53.26	Q
6	3	Lisa Miller	Great Britain	53.46	q
7	3	Iryna Khliustava	Belarus	53.47	q
8	2	Magali Yáñez	Mexico	53.66	SB
9	1	Olha Zavhorodnya	Ukraine	53.70	Q
10	1	Martina Näf	Switzerland	53.71	
11	2	Lorena de Oliveira	Brazil	54.32	
12	1	Anna Gavriushenko	Kazakhstan	54.33	
13	3	Jūratė Stanislovaitienė	Lithuania	54.59	
14	2	Joanne Cuddihy	Ireland	54.91	
15	1	Elaine McCaffrey	Ireland	55.46	
16	3	Pınar Saka	Turkey	55.55	
17	2	Zhong Zhen	China	55.72	
18	3	Martine Cloutier-LeBlanc	Canada	56.33	
19	2	Vaya Vladeva	Bulgaria	56.59	
20	3	An Ning	China	57.35	
21	2	Charlotte Osborne	New Zealand	57.48	
22	1	Suraporn Loulert	Thailand	57.72	
	1	Kirsi Mykkänen	Finland	DNS	
	1	Patrícia Lopes	Portugal	DNS	

=== Final ===
Rank	Athlete	Nationality	Time	Notes
1st place, gold medalist(s)	Natalya Nazarova	Russia	51.31	SB
2nd place, silver medalist(s)	Fatou Bintou Fall	Senegal	51.33	SB
3rd place, bronze medalist(s)	Tatyana Khadjimuratova	Kazakhstan	52.46	
4	Asami Tanno	Japan	52.91	
5	Yelena Migunova	Russia	53.21	
6	Iryna Khliustava	Belarus	53.32	
7	Lisa Miller	Great Britain	53.38	
8	Olha Zavhorodnya	Ukraine	53.53	PB
