= 2007 Asian Athletics Championships – Women's 1500 metres =

The women's 1500 metres event at the 2007 Asian Athletics Championships was held in Amman, Jordan on July 29.

== Results ==
| Rank | Name | Nationality | Time | Notes |
|---|---|---|---|---|
| 1st place, gold medalist(s) | Sinimole Paulose | India | 4:12.69 | |
| 2nd place, silver medalist(s) | Sara Bakheet | Bahrain | 4:26.21 | |
| 3rd place, bronze medalist(s) | Truong Thanh Hang | Vietnam | 4:26.77 | |
| 4 | Mika Yoshikawa | Japan | 4:28.85 | |
| 5 | Sushma Devi | India | 4:41.29 | |
| | Baraa Marouane | Jordan | DNF | |
| | Leila Ebrahimi | Iran | DNS | |
| | Fathmath Hasma | Maldives | DNS | |
