= Kim Seong-eun (athlete) =

South Korean long-distance runner

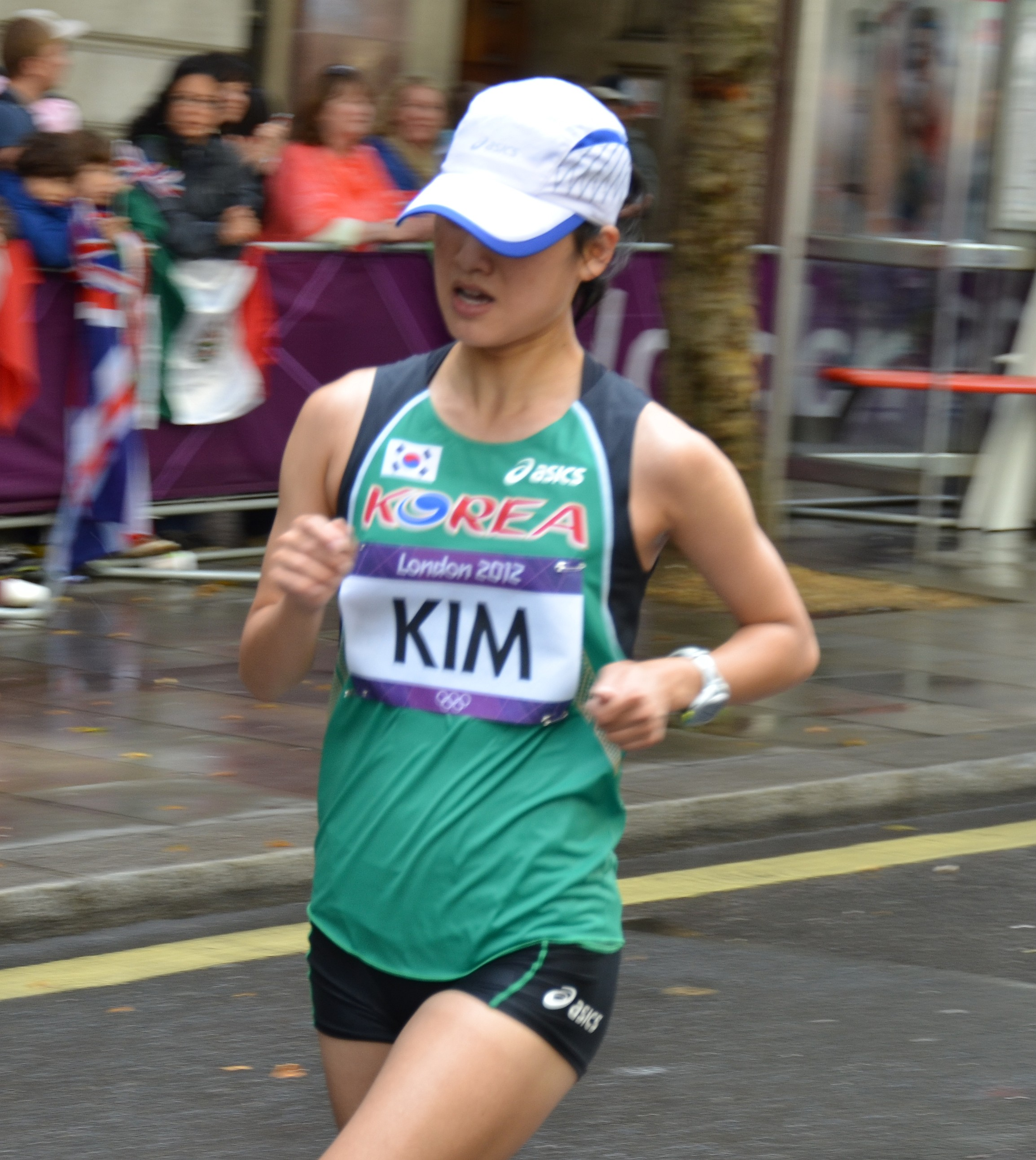
- Kim Seong-Eun in the 2012 Summer Olympics marathon

Personal information
- Born: February 24, 1989 (age 37)
- Height: 1.64 m (5 ft 4 1/2 in)
- Weight: 47 kg (104 lb)

Sport
- Country: South Korea
- Sport: Athletics
- Event: Marathon

Kim Seong-Eun (Korean: 김성은; born 24 February 1989 in Seoul) is a South Korean long-distance runner who competes in marathon races. She represented her country at the 2012 Summer Olympics and the 2011 World Championships in Athletics. Her personal best for the marathon is 2:27:20 hours, set in 2013.

== Career ==
She started out doing middle- and long-distance track as a teenager and broke the South Korean indoor record for the 3000 metres at the 2005 Asian Indoor Games, taking the silver medal behind India's O. P. Jaisha. She established herself nationally in 2006 at the age of seventeen by winning the 5000 metres national title and placing second over 1500 metres. She ran in both the 3000 m and 5000 m at the 2008 World Junior Championships in Athletics and finished 15th and tenth, respectively. She also made her debut over the half marathon that year, winning a race in Incheon in March setting a best of 73:14 at the Kagawa Marugame Half Marathon in Japan.

Kim turned away from track running from 2009 onwards and focused on road running events instead. She attempted a marathon debut at the 2009 Seoul International Marathon but failed to finish the distance. She placed tenth in the half marathon at the Summer Universiade, and then came runner-up to Lee Sun-young at the JoongAng Seoul Marathon with a time of 2:37:30 hours. She only competed in two major competitions in 2010 but performed well: she ran a personal best of 71:34 at the Kagawa Marugame Half Marathon and improved her marathon best to 2:29:27 at the Seoul International race, coming fifth.

Her marathon performances were enough to gain a place on the team for the 2011 World Championships in Athletics, which was hosted on home soil in Daegu. There she came 28th in the championship marathon, Korea's best performer from their five-woman team. She ended the year with a 10,000 metres win at the Korean National Sports Festival, setting a personal best of 33:46.61 minutes. A fourth-place finish in 2:29:53 hours at the 2012 Seoul International Marathon earned her a spot on the Olympic marathon team. At the 2012 London Olympics she placed 96th in the Olympic marathon with a time of 2:46:38.

At the 2013 Kagawa Marugame race she was two seconds off her half marathon best and a new marathon best followed shortly after at the Seoul International Marathon, where she was fourth overall and the first Korean with her run of 2:27:20 hours.

== Personal bests ==
- 3000 metres – 9:19.79 min (2007)
- 3000 m indoor – 9:40.22 min (2005) NR
- 5000 metres – 16:09.94 (2008)
- Half marathon – 1:11:34 (2010)
- Marathon – 2:27:20 (2013)
