= Athletics at the 2013 SEA Games – Men's 4 × 100 metres relay =

The men's 4 × 100 metres relay was part of the athletics events was at the 2013 SEA Games, held in Naypyidaw, Myanmar. The track and field event took place at the Wunna Theikdi Stadiumon December 16.

== Schedule ==
All times are Myanmar Standard Time (UTC+06:30)

Date	Time	Event
Monday, 16 December 2013	15:20	Final

== Records ==
Prior to this competition, the existing world, Asian, and Southeast Asian Games records were as follows.

World Record	Jamaica	36.84	London, Great Britain	11 August 2012
Asian Record	Japan	38.03	Osaka, Japan	1 September 2007
Games Record	Thailand	38.95	Nakhon Ratchasima, Thailand	10 December 2007

== Results ==
Rank	Lane	Nation	Competitors	Time	Notes
1st place, gold medalist(s)	3	Thailand (THA)	Ruttanapon Sowan, Aphisit Promkaew, Jirapong Meenapra, Suppachai Chimdee	39.75	
2nd place, silver medalist(s)	5	Singapore (SIN)	Muhammad Elfi Mustapa, Li Loong Calvin Kang, Cheng Wei Lee, Muhammad Amirudin Jamal	39.79	
3rd place, bronze medalist(s)	6	Indonesia (INA)	Yaspi Boby, Iswandi Iswandi, Fadlin Fadlin, Rozikin Muhammad Rozikin	40.15	
4	2	Malaysia (MAS)	Eddie Edward Jr, Mohd Shahmimi Azmi, Mohd Azhar Md Ismail, Harith Ammar Mohd Sobri	41.35	
5	4	Myanmar (MYA)	Kyaw San Lin, Kyaw Zin Aung, Zaw Lwin Htoo, Thet Zaw Win	41.76	NR
