= List of Burmese records in athletics =

The following are the national records in athletics in Myanmar (Burma) maintained by Myanmar Athletics Federation (MAF).

== Outdoor ==
Key to tables: Awaiting ratification Record not kept by MAF Not ratified or later rescinded by MAF

=== Men ===
Event	Record	Athlete	Date	Meet	Place	Ref.
100 m	10.64	Soe Win	7 December 1969	Southeast Asian Peninsular Games	Rangoon, Burma	
200 m	21.52	Soe Win	8 December 1969	Southeast Asian Peninsular Games	Rangoon, Burma	
200 m	21.36 (Note: recognized by federation but wind-assisted)	Kyaw Htoo Aung	3 December 1991	Southeast Asian Games	Manila, Philippines	
400 m	48.63	Htay Win	30 November 1991	Southeast Asian Games	Manila, Philippines	
800 m	1:47.9 h	Jimmy Crampton	11 December 1970	Asian Games	Bangkok, Thailand	
1500 m	3:47.83	Shwe Aung	13 June 1993	Southeast Asian Games	Singapore	
3000 m	8:14.71	Gopal Thein Win	7 August 1993		Weinstadt, Germany	
5000 m	14:11.28	Gopal Thein Win	4 December 1993	Asian Championships	Manila, Philippines	
10,000 m	29:37.40	Gopal Thein Win	24 February 1993		Rangoon, Myanmar	
Marathon	2:19:57	Khin Soe	17 December 1978	Asian Games	Bangkok, Thailand	
110 m hurdles	14.43	Hpone Myint	13 December 1981	Southeast Asian Games	Manila, Philippines	
400 m hurdles	52.07	Htay Win	2 December 1991	Southeast Asian Games	Manila, Philippines	
3000 m steeplechase	8:56.18	Maung Hla	12 December 1981	Southeast Asian Games	Manila, Philippines	
High jump	2.03 m	Htin Linn	28 April 2016	78th Singapore Open Championships	Kallang, Singapore	
Pole vault	4.75 m	Kyaw Zaw	31 March 1974		Rangoon, Burma	
Long jump	7.56 m	Thant Zin	20 November 1977	Southeast Asian Games	Kuala Lumpur, Malaysia	
Triple jump	15.06 m (+0.1 m/s) (Note: recognized by World Athletics)	Hein Htet Aung	1 December 2022	Thailand International Open Championships	Pathumthani, Thailand	
Triple jump	15.08 m (Note: ratified by MAF but not recognized by World Athletics)	Hein Htet Aung	28 November 2022	Thailand Open	Pathumthani, Thailand	
Shot put	15.58 m	Htet Wai Yan	16 June 2024	Thai International Open Championships	Bangkok, Thailand	
Discus throw	48.26 m	Htet Wai Yan	17 June 2024	Thai International Open Championships	Bangkok, Thailand	
Hammer throw	59.23 m	Aung Ye Htet	5 December 2023 (Note: by MAF source; 6 December 2023 by other sources)	National Inter Ministry Championships	Naypyidaw, Myanmar	
Javelin throw	67.24 m	Nan Htet Maung	8 December 2023	National Inter Ministry Championships	Naypyidaw, Myanmar	
Decathlon	6526 pts h	Soe Myint Aung	3–4 January 1986		Rangoon, Burma	
Decathlon	100m / Long jump / Shot put / High jump / 400m / 110m H / Discus / Pole vault / Javelin / 1500m					
20,000 m walk (track)	1:44:21.31	Pyae Phyo Tun	22 August 2017	Southeast Asian Games	Bukit Jalil, Malaysia	
20 km walk (road)	1:29:43	Nyunt Win	24 February 1997		Rangoon, Myanmar	
50 km walk (road)	4:21:52	Nyunt Win	17 January 1997		Rangoon, Myanmar	
4 × 100 m relay	41.76	Myanmar; Kyaw San Lin; Kyaw Zin Aung; Zaw Lwin Htoo thet Zaw Win	16 December 2013	Southeast Asian Games	Naypyidaw, Myanmar	
4 × 400 m relay	3:16.12	Burma; Soe Win; Jimmy Crampton; Khin Maung Tint; Khin Maung Gye	10 December 1969	Southeast Asian Peninsular Games	Rangoon, Burma	

=== Women ===
Event	Record	Athlete	Date	Meet	Place	Ref.
100 m	11.66	Than Than Htay	14 October 1997	Southeast Asian Games	Jakarta, Indonesia	
200 m	23.38	Lwin Kay Khine	24 August 2005		Penang, Malaysia	
400 m	52.69	Yin Yin Khine	29 November 2005	Southeast Asian Games	Manila, Philippines	
800 m	2:01.80	Myint Myint Aye	13 February 2005		Yangon, Myanmar	
1500 m	4:12.21	Khin Khin Htwe	29 August 1991	World Championships	Tokyo, Japan	
3000 m	9:04.56	Khin Khin Htwe	11 October 1994	Asian Games	Hiroshima, Japan	
5000 m	16:06.01	Phyu War Thet	17 December 2013	Southeast Asian Games	Naypyidaw, Myanmar	
10,000 m	33:52.2 h	Win-Win Mar	20 July 1997		Rangoon, Myanmar	
Marathon	2:38:42	Pa Pa	13 April 2004		Rangoon, Myanmar	
100 m hurdles	14.35	Nwe Nwe Yee	13 December 1981	Southeast Asian Games	Manila, Philippines	
400 m hurdles	59.38	Cherry	14 September 2001	Southeast Asian Games	Kuala Lumpur, Malaysia	
3000 m steeplechase	10:52.75	Khin Mar Se	12 June 2015	Southeast Asian Games	Kallang, Singapore	
High jump	1.77 m	Khin Ohn	24 August 1989	Southeast Asian Games	Kuala Lumpur, Malaysia	
Pole vault	3.40 m	Hnin Yee Wai	28 January 2015		Naypyidaw, Myanmar	
Long jump	6.00 m	Soe Soe Nyein	30 January 2001		Rangoon, Myanmar	
Triple jump	12.72 m	Soe Soe Nyein	30 March 2001		Rangoon, Myanmar	
Shot put	14.38 m	Jennifer Tin Lay	3 February 1973		Rangoon, Burma	
Discus throw	50.46 m	Aye Aye Nwe	4 February 1994		Madras, India	
Hammer throw	47.52 m	Thwel Thwel Moe	17 June 2024	Thai International Open Championships	Bangkok, Thailand	
Javelin throw	44.89 m	Soe Soe Htwe	21 January 2015		Naypyidaw, Myanmar	
Heptathlon	4633 pts h	Khin Ohn	2–3 February 1985		Rangoon, Burma	
Heptathlon	100m H / High jump / Shot put / 200m / Long jump / Javelin / 800m; / 1.71 m					
10,000 m walk (track)	55:28.94	Than Than Soe	23 August 2017	Southeast Asian Games	Bukit Jalil, Malaysia	
20,000 m walk (track)	1:42:14.8 h	Kay Khine Myo Tin	6 February 2011	59th Burmese Championships	Yangon, Myanmar	
20 km walk (road)	1:40:15	Kay Khine Myo Tun	15 December 2013	Southeast Asian Games	Naypyidaw, Myanmar	
20 km walk (road)	1:35:03 X	Saw Mar Lar Nwe	15 December 2013	Southeast Asian Games	Naypyidaw, Myanmar	
50 km walk (road)						
4 × 100 m relay	47.42	Burma; Aye Shwe; Phin Phop Khin; Mrathuzar; Myint Myint Sein	11 October 1981		Rangoon, Burma	
4 × 400 m relay	3:35.1 h	Myanmar; Yin Yin Khine; Myint Myint Aye; Lai Lai Win; Kay Khine Lwin	30 August 2005		Rangoon, Myanmar	

== Indoor ==
=== Men ===
Event	Record	Athlete	Date	Meet	Place	Ref.
60 m						
200 m						
400 m						
800 m						
1500 m	4:04.65	Maung Chet	7 March 2008	World Championships	Valencia, Spain	
3000 m	9:18.27	Hei Mauk	14 November 2005	Asian Indoor Games	Pattaya, Thailand	
60 m hurdles						
High jump						
Pole vault						
Long jump						
Triple jump						
Shot put						
Heptathlon						
Heptathlon	60m / Long jump / Shot put / High jump / 60m H / Pole vault / 1000m					
5000 m walk						
4 × 400 m relay						

=== Women ===
Event	Record	Athlete	Date	Meet	Place	Ref.
60 m						
200 m						
400 m	1:00.78	Kay Khine Lwin	12 March 2010	World Championships	Doha, Qatar	
800 m	2:20.21	Ni Ni Toe	13 November 2005	Asian Indoor Games	Pattaya, Thailand	
1500 m	4:57.61	Ni Ni Toe	15 November 2005	Asian Indoor Games	Pattaya, Thailand	
3000 m						
60 m hurdles						
High jump						
Pole vault						
Long jump						
Triple jump						
Shot put						
Pentathlon						
Pentathlon	60m H / High jump / Shot put / Long jump / 800m					
3000 m walk						
4 × 400 m relay						
