= Daisuke Arakawa =

Japanese long jumper (born 1981)

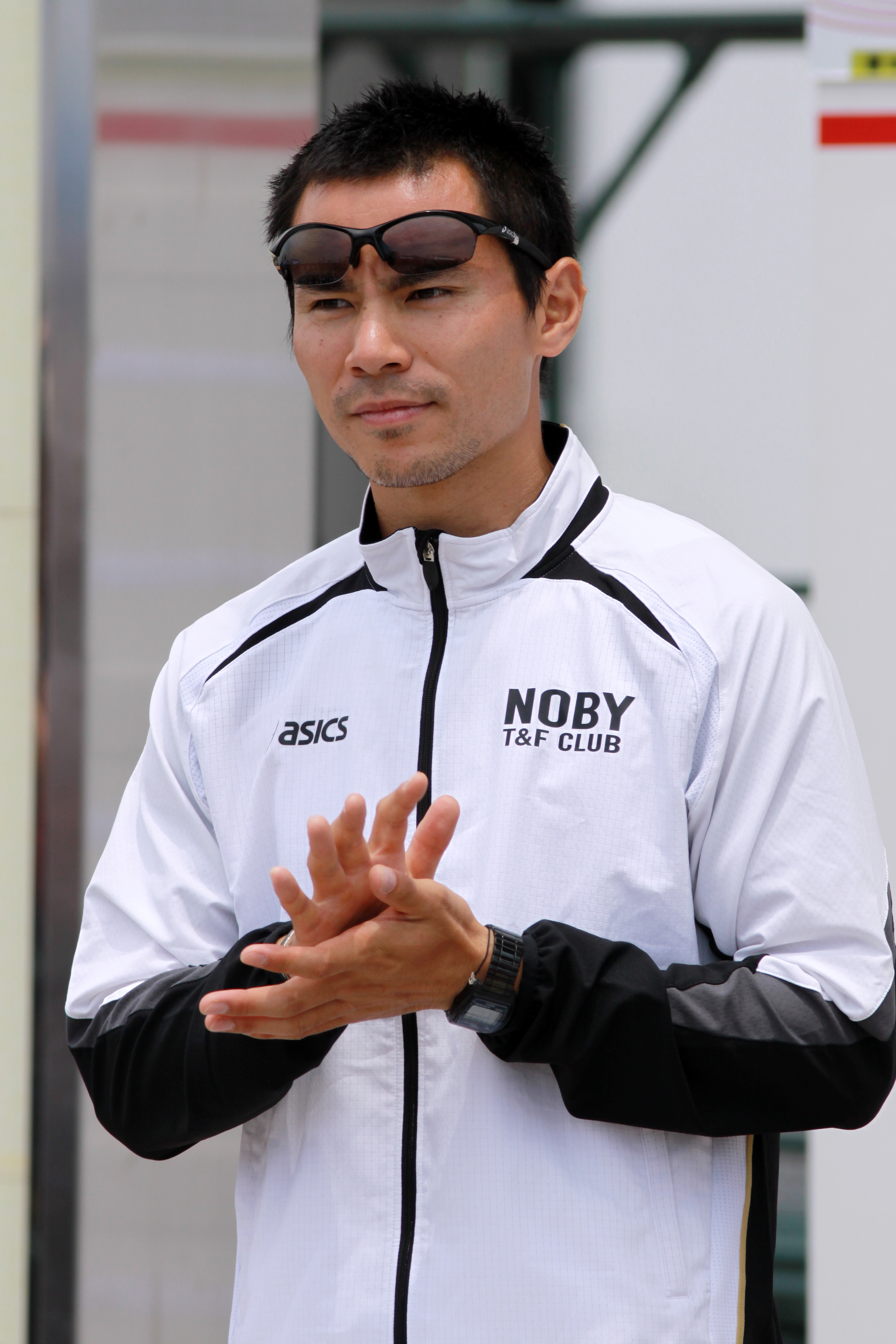
- Daisuke Arakawa

Personal information
- Born: 19 September 1981 (age 44) Hyōgo Prefecture, Japan
- Education: Doshisha University
- Height: 179 cm (5 ft 10 in)
- Weight: 73 kg (161 lb)

Sport
- Country: Japan
- Sport: Athletics
- Event: Long jump
- Personal best: Long jump: 8.09 (Kobe 2008)
Medal record
Men's athletics
Representing Japan
Asian Indoor Championships
Silver medal – second place	2006 Pattaya	Long jump
World Masters Games
Gold medal – first place	2017 Auckland	Long jump (M35)

Daisuke Arakawa (荒川 大輔, Arakawa Daisuke; born 19 September 1981) is a Japanese athlete specialising in the long jump. He twice represented his country at World Championships, in 2007 and 2009, failing to reach the final.

His personal bests are 8.09 metres outdoors (2008) and 7.77 metres indoors (2003). He also holds the Japanese masters record (M35) with 7.33 metres outdoors (2017).

== Competition record ==
Year	Competition	Venue	Position	Notes
Representing Japan
2000	World Junior Championships	Santiago, Chile	15th (q)	7.31 m (wind: +0.8 m/s)
2003	Universiade	Daegu, South Korea	12th	7.58 m (wind: +0.7 m/s)
2003	Asian Championships	Manila, Philippines	5th	7.77 m (wind: +0.6 m/s)
2006	Asian Indoor Championships	Pattaya, Thailand	2nd	7.75 m
2007	Asian Championships	Amman, Jordan	9th	7.61 m (wind: +4.3 m/s)
2007	World Championships	Osaka, Japan	26th (q)	7.62 m (wind: +0.8 m/s)
2009	World Championships	Daegu, South Korea	41st (q)	7.53 m (wind: +0.3 m/s)
2017	World Masters Games (M35)	Auckland, New Zealand	1st	7.33 m (wind: +0.0 m/s)

== National titles ==
- Japanese Championships
  - Long jump: 2007, 2009, 2012
