= Athletics at the 2013 SEA Games – Women's 20 kilometres walk =

The women's 20 kilometres walk at the 2013 SEA Games, the athletics was held in Naypyidaw, Myanmar. The track and field events is taking place at the Wunna Theikdi Stadiumon December 15.

== Schedule ==
All times are Myanmar Standard Time (UTC+06:30)

| Date | Time | Event |
|---|---|---|
| Sunday, 15 December 2013 | 07:00 | Final |

== Records ==
Prior to this competition, the existing world, Asian, and Southeast Asian Games records were as follows.

| World Record | Elena Lashmanova (RUS) | 1:25:02 | London, Great Britain | 11 August 2012 |
| Asian Record | Shenjie Qieyang (CHN) | 1:25:16 | London, Great Britain | 11 August 2012 |
| Games Record | Yuan Yu Fang (MAS) | 1:39:25 | Hanoi, Vietnam | 11 December 2003 |

== Results ==
Legend

- DSQ — Disqualified

| Rank | Athlete | Time | Notes |
|---|---|---|---|
| 1st place, gold medalist(s) | Nguyen Thi Thanh Phuc (VIE) | 1:37:08 | GR, NR |
| 2nd place, silver medalist(s) | Kay Khine Myo Tun (MYA) | 1:40:15 | |
| 3rd place, bronze medalist(s) | Tanaphon Assawawongcharoen (THA) | 1:44:46 | NR |
| - | Saw Mar Lar Nwe (MYA) | 1:35:03 | DSQ |
