= Athletics at the 2013 SEA Games – Women's 5000 metres =

The women's 5000 metres at the 2013 SEA Games was part of the athletics events held in Naypyidaw, Myanmar. The track and field event took place at the Wunna Theikdi Stadiumon December 17.

== Schedule ==
All times are Myanmar Standard Time (UTC+06:30)

Date	Time	Event
Tuesday, 17 December 2013	08:15	Final

== Records ==
Prior to this competition, the existing world, Asian, and Southeast Asian Games records were as follows.

World Record	Tirunesh Dibaba (ETH)	14:11.15	Beijing, China	6 June 2008
Asian Record	Jiang Bo (CHN)	14:28.09	Shanghai, China	23 October 1997
Games Record	Triyaningsih (INA)	15:54.32	Nakhon Ratchasima, Thailand	8 December 2007

== Results ==
Rank	Athlete	Time	Notes
1st place, gold medalist(s)	Phyu War Thet (MYA)	16:06.01	NR
2nd place, silver medalist(s)	Triyaningsih Triyaningsih (INA)	16:24.36	
3rd place, bronze medalist(s)	Khin Mar Sal (MYA)	17:37.57	
4	Lodkeo Inthakoummane (LAO)	17:45.55	NR
