= Athletics at the 2011 Summer Universiade – Women's 10,000 metres =

The women's 10,000 metres event at the 2011 Summer Universiade was held on 16 August.

== Results ==
Rank	Name	Nationality	Time	Notes
1st place, gold medalist(s)	Fadime Suna	Turkey	33:11.92	
2nd place, silver medalist(s)	Hanae Tanaka	Japan	33:15.57	
3rd place, bronze medalist(s)	Mai Ishibashi	Japan	33:41.90	
4	Triyaningsih	Indonesia	34:04.92	
5	Jiang Xiaoli	China	34:05.60	
6	Danielle Trevis	New Zealand	35:05.19	
7	Giovanna Epis	Italy	35:46.28	
8	Volha Minina	Belarus	36:17.46	
9	Vaida Žūsinaitė	Lithuania	36:35.30	
10	Annet Chebet	Uganda	36:47.95	
11	Rosmery Quispe	Bolivia	36:51.05	SB
12	Chen Xue	China	38:09.29	
13	Amita	Indonesia	41:33.69	
14	Diana Jerotich Yator	Kenya	47:49.46	
	Natalya Popkova	Russia	DNF	
	Stella Akidi	Uganda	DNS	
	Slađana Perunović	Montenegro	DNS	
