= Syria at the 2005 Asian Indoor Games =

- IOC code: SYR
- NOC: Syrian Olympic Committee

in Bangkok
- Medals Ranked 22nd: Gold 0 Silver 1 Bronze 0 Total 1

Asian Indoor Games appearances
- 2005; 2007; 2009; 2013; 2017; 2021; 2025

Syria participated in the 2005 Asian Indoor Games held in Bangkok, Thailand from November 12, 2005 to November 19, 2005. It won 1 silver medal.

== Medals ==
=== Silver ===
Indoor athletics

- Women's 400 m: Munira Al-Saleh

== See also ==
- Syria at the 2006 Asian Games
