= Liu Haili =

Chinese heptathlete

Medal record

Women's athletics

Representing China

Asian Indoor Championships
Silver medal – second place	2006 Pattaya	Pentathlon

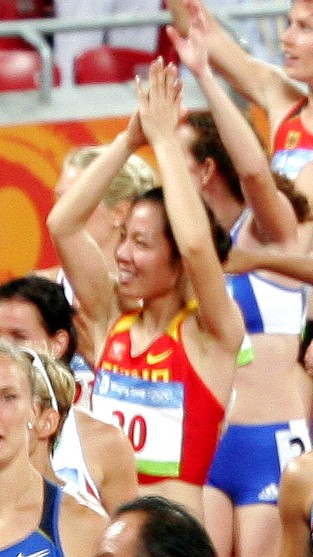
Liu Haili at the 2008 Summer Olympics

Liu Haili (Chinese: 刘海莉; born 24 December 1984, in Haicheng) is a retired Chinese heptathlete. She represented her country at the 2008 Summer Olympics. Her personal best score is 6132 points, achieved at the 2005 National Games in Nanjing.

== Achievements ==
Year	Competition	Venue	Position	Event	Notes
Representing China
2006	Asian Indoor Championships	Pattaya, Thailand	2nd	Pentathlon	4220 pts
2007	Asian Indoor Games	Macau, China	2nd	Pentathlon	4063 pts
2008	Olympic Games	Beijing, China	20th	Heptathlon	6041 pts
2009	Asian Indoor Games	Hanoi, Vietnam	2nd	Pentathlon	3908 pts
