= Miho Sato =

Japanese middle-distance runner

Medal record

Women's athletics

Representing Japan

Asian Championships
Gold medal – first place	2002 Colombo	800 m
Gold medal – first place	2005 Incheon	800 m
Gold medal – first place	2005 Incheon	1500 m
Silver medal – second place	2000 Jakarta	4×400 m
Silver medal – second place	2002 Colombo	4×400 m

Miho Sato (佐藤 美保, Satō Miho; née Sugimori; born 14 April 1978) is a retired Japanese athlete specialising in middle-distance events. From Ise, Mie, she competed in the 800 metres at the 2004 Summer Olympics without reaching the semifinals.

She is married to a long-distance runner, Atsushi Sato.

== Competition record ==
Year	Competition	Venue	Position	Event	Notes
Representing Japan
1999	World Indoor Championships	Maebashi, Japan	6th	4 × 400 m relay	3:41.47
2000	Asian Championships	Jakarta, Indonesia	9th (h)	400 m	55.51
2000	Asian Championships	Jakarta, Indonesia	2nd	4 × 400 m relay	3:37.15
2001	East Asian Games	Osaka, Japan	2nd	4 × 400 m relay	3:33.06
2001	World Championships	Edmonton, Canada	13th (h)	4 × 400 m relay	3:33.51
2002	Asian Championships	Colombo, Sri Lanka	1st	800 m	2:03.59
2002	Asian Championships	Colombo, Sri Lanka	2nd	4 × 400 m relay	3:38.29
2002	Asian Games	Busan, South Korea	6th	800 m	2:05.34
2002	Asian Games	Busan, South Korea	4th	4 × 400 m relay	3:33.23
2003	World Indoor Championships	Birmingham, United Kingdom	11th (sf)	800 m	2:05.66
2004	Olympic Games	Athens, Greece	21st (h)	800 m	2:02.82
2005	World Championships	Helsinki, Finland	24th (h)	800 m	2:02.82
2005	Asian Championships	Incheon, South Korea	1st	800 m	2:01.84
2005	Asian Championships	Incheon, South Korea	1st	1500 m	4:12.69
2006	Asian Games	Doha, Qatar	5th	800 m	2:05.28

== Personal bests ==
Outdoor

- 800 metres – 2:00.45 (Tokyo 2005) NR
- 1000 metres – 2:41.08 (Yokohama 2002) AR
- 1500 metres – 4:09.30 (Kumamoto 2005)

Indoor

- 800 metres – 2:00.78 (Yokohama 2003) AR
