= 2002 Asian Athletics Championships – Women's 800 metres =

The women's 800 metres event at the 2002 Asian Athletics Championships was held in Colombo, Sri Lanka on 11–12 August.

== Medalists ==
Gold	Silver	Bronze
Miho Sato; Japan	Tatyana Borisova; Kyrgyzstan	Zamira Amirova; Uzbekistan

== Results ==
=== Heats ===
Rank	Heat	Name	Nationality	Time	Notes
1	1	Tomoko Matsushima	Japan	2:09.25	Q
2	1	Zamira Amirova	Uzbekistan	2:09.29	Q
3	1	Pham Dinh Khanh Doan	Vietnam	2:09.41	Q, SB
4	1	Sunita Rani	India	2:09.62	q
5	1	K.L.L. Gunawardana	Sri Lanka	2:10.61	q
6	2	Tatyana Borisova	Kyrgyzstan	2:11.40	Q
7	2	Miho Sato	Japan	2:11.51	Q
8	2	Myint Myint Aye	Myanmar	2:11.53	Q
9	2	Sunita Dahiya	India	2:11.56	
10	1	Ryu Su-Hee	South Korea	2:14.50	
11	2	Sanjeewani Niluka	Sri Lanka	2:16.34	SB
	2	Anusha Athapattu	Sri Lanka	DNF	

=== Final ===
Rank	Name	Nationality	Time	Notes
1st place, gold medalist(s)	Miho Sato	Japan	2:03.59	
2nd place, silver medalist(s)	Tatyana Borisova	Kyrgyzstan	2:03.67	
3rd place, bronze medalist(s)	Zamira Amirova	Uzbekistan	2:04.48	
4	Myint Myint Aye	Myanmar	2:06.07	SB
5	Sunita Kanojia	India	2:06.67	
6	Tomoko Matsushima	Japan	2:07.85	
7	Pham Dinh Khanh Doan	Vietnam	2:10.65	
8	K.L.L. Gunawardana	Sri Lanka	2:12.56	
