= 2002 Asian Athletics Championships – Women's 4 × 400 metres relay =

The women's 4 × 400 metres relay event at the 2002 Asian Athletics Championships was held in Colombo, Sri Lanka on 12 August.

== Results ==
| Rank | Nation | Athletes | Time | Notes |
|---|---|---|---|---|
| 1st place, gold medalist(s) | India | J.J. Shobha, Soma Biswas, Sunita Dahiya, Sagardeep Kaur | 3:37.48 | |
| 2nd place, silver medalist(s) | Japan | Miho Sugimori, Mayu Kida, Sakie Nobuoka, Makiko Yoshida | 3:38.29 | |
| 3rd place, bronze medalist(s) | Sri Lanka | Menaka Wickremasinghe, Lalani Gunawardena, Swarnamali Edirisinghe, Damayanthi Dharsha | 3:42.71 | |
