= Zamira Amirova =

Uzbekistani middle-distance runner

Medal record

Women's athletics

Representing Uzbekistan

Asian Championships
Silver medal – second place	2002 Colombo	400 m
Bronze medal – third place	2002 Colombo	800 m
Bronze medal – third place	2003 Manila	800 m
Bronze medal – third place	2005 Incheon	800 m

Asian Indoor Championships
Gold medal – first place	2006 Pattaya	800 m

Zamira Shamiliyevna Amirova (born 11 June 1979) is a retired Uzbekistani middle-distance runner, born in Tashkent, who specialized in the 800 metres. Her personal best time is 2:02.30 minutes, achieved in June 2002 in Tashkent.

== Achievements ==
Year	Competition	Venue	Position	Event	Notes
Representing Uzbekistan
2000	Olympic Games	Sydney, Australia	21st (h)	4 × 400 m relay	3:43.96
2002	Asian Championships	Colombo, Sri Lanka	2nd	400 m	53.87
2002	Asian Championships	Colombo, Sri Lanka	3rd	800 m	2:04.48
2002	Asian Games	Busan, South Korea	3rd	800 m	2:05.05
2003	Asian Championships	Manila, Philippines	12th (h)	400 m	55.65
2003	Asian Championships	Manila, Philippines	3rd	800 m	2:02.84
2003	Afro-Asian Games	Hyderabad, India	7th	800 m	2:09.00
2004	Asian Indoor Championships	Tehran, Iran	7th (h)	400 m	58.16
2004	Olympic Games	Athens, Greece	37th (h)	400 m	54.43
2005	Asian Championships	Incheon, South Korea	3rd	800 m	2:04.22
2006	Asian Indoor Championships	Pattaya, Thailand	1st	800 m	2:07.01
2006	Asian Games	Doha, Qatar	3rd	800 m	2:03.59
