= Athletics at the 2013 SEA Games – Women's 10,000 metres =

The women's 10000 metres was part of the athletics events at the 2013 SEA Games held in Naypyidaw, Myanmar. The track and field event took place at the Wunna Theikdi Stadiumon December 19.

== Schedule ==
All times are Myanmar Standard Time (UTC+06:30)

Date	Time	Event
Thursday, 19 December 2013	07:00	Final

== Records ==
Prior to this competition, the existing world, Asian, and Southeast Asian Games records were as follows.

World Record	Wang Junxia (CHN)	29:31.78	Beijing, China	8 September 1993
Asian Record	Wang Junxia (CHN)	29:31.78	Beijing, China	8 September 1993
Games Record	Triyaningsih (INA)	32:49.47	Vientiane, Laos	17 December 2009

== Results ==
Legend

Rank	Athlete	Time	Notes
1st place, gold medalist(s)	Triyaningsih Triyaningsih (INA)	34:32.68	
2nd place, silver medalist(s)	Phyu War Thet (MYA)	34:39.32	
3rd place, bronze medalist(s)	Lodkeo Inthakoummane (LAO)	37:41.96	NR
4	Nilar San (MYA)	39:47.88	
—	Pham Thi Binh (VIE)	DNS	
