= Gu Biwei =

Chinese high jumper

Personal information
- Born: 17 February 1988 (age 38)

Sport
- Country: China
- Sport: Athletics
- Event: High jump

Achievements and titles
- Personal best: High jump: 1.90 m (2005)

Gu Biwei (born 17 February 1988) is a Chinese female high jumper, who won an individual gold medal at the Youth World Championships.
