= Triyaningsih =

Indonesian long-distance runner (born 1987)

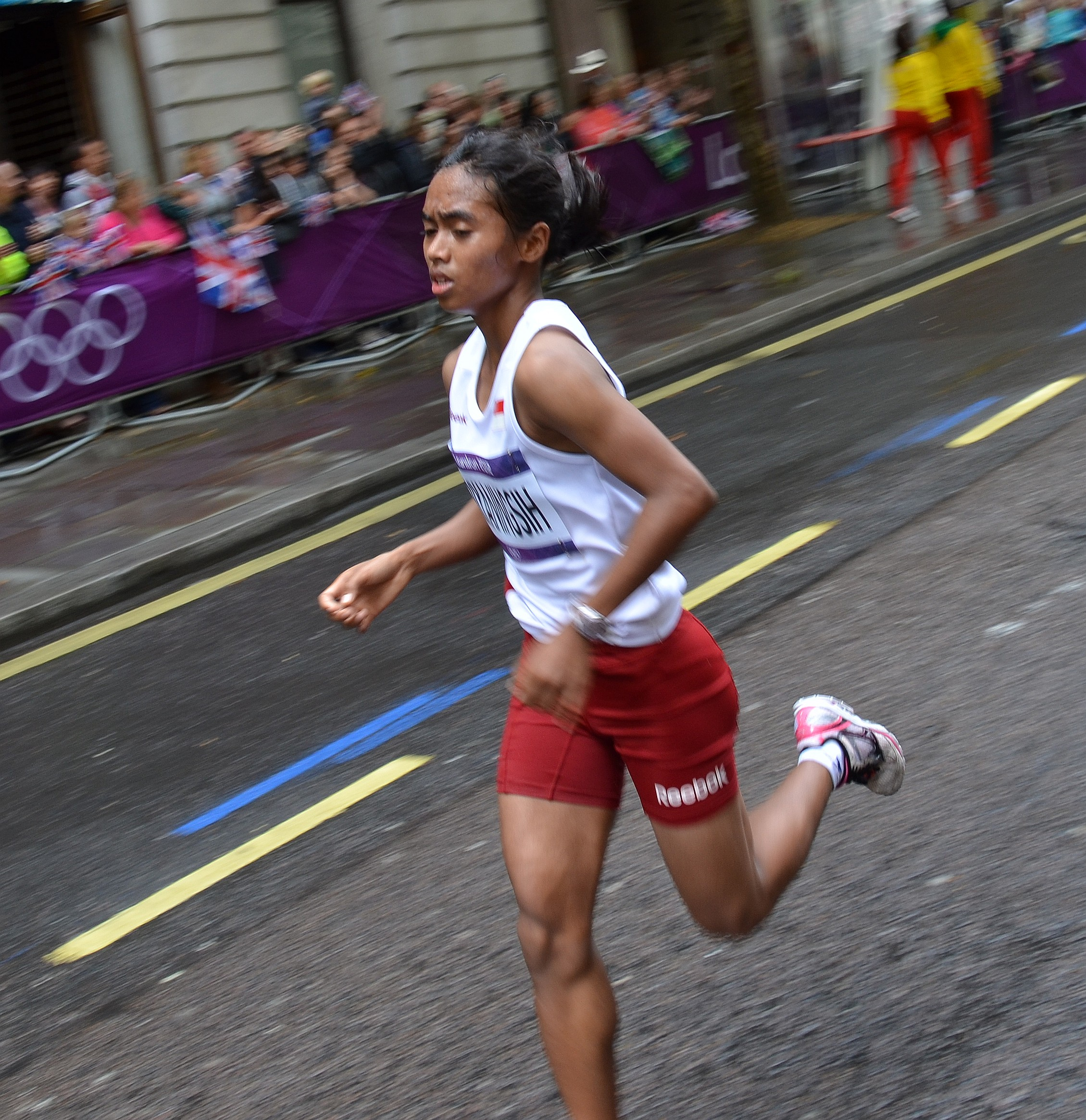
- Triyaningsih in the 2012 Summer Olympics marathon

Personal information
- Nationality: Indonesia
- Born: 15 May 1988 (age 38) Semarang, Indonesia
- Height: 1.47 m (4 ft 10 in)
- Weight: 40 kg (88 lb)
- Website: www.triyaningsih.com

Sport
- Country: Indonesia
- Sport: Athletics
- Event: Marathon
Medal record
Women's athletics
Representing Indonesia
Southeast Asian Games
Gold medal – first place	2007 Nakhon Ratchasima	5000 metres
Gold medal – first place	2007 Nakhon Ratchasima	10000 metres
Gold medal – first place	2009 Vientiane	5000 metres
Gold medal – first place	2009 Vientiane	10000 metres
Gold medal – first place	2011 Jakarta–Palembang	5000 metres
Gold medal – first place	2011 Jakarta–Palembang	10000 metres
Gold medal – first place	2011 Jakarta–Palembang	Marathon
Gold medal – first place	2013 Naypyidaw	10000 metres
Gold medal – first place	2015 Singapore	5000 metres
Gold medal – first place	2015 Singapore	10000 metres
Gold medal – first place	2017 Kuala Lumpur	10000 metres
Silver medal – second place	2013 Naypyidaw	5000 metres
Bronze medal – third place	2017 Kuala Lumpur	5000 metres
ASEAN University Games
Gold medal – first place	2010 Chiang Mai	5000 metres
Gold medal – first place	2010 Chiang Mai	10000 metres

Triyaningsih (born 15 May 1987) is an Indonesian long-distance runner. She competed in the marathon at the 2012 Summer Olympics, placing 84th with a time of 2:41:15.

== Competition record ==
Year	Competition	Venue	Position	Event	Notes
Representing Indonesia
2007	Southeast Asian Games	Nakhon Ratchasima, Thailand	1st	5000 m	15:54.32
2007	Southeast Asian Games	Nakhon Ratchasima, Thailand	1st	10,000 m	34.07.35
2009	Southeast Asian Games	Vientiane, Laos	1st	5000 m	15:56.79
2009	Southeast Asian Games	Vientiane, Laos	1st	10,000 m	34:52.74
2010	Asian Games	Guangzhou, China	9th	10,000 m	33:07.45
2010	Asian Games	Guangzhou, China	4th	Marathon	2:31:49
2011	Asian Championships	Kobe, Japan	6th	5000 m	16:05.18
2011	Universiade	Shenzhen, China	10th	5000 m	16:26.06
2011	Universiade	Shenzhen, China	4th	10,000 m	34:04.92
2011	Southeast Asian Games	Palembang, Indonesia	1st	5000 m	16:06.37
2011	Southeast Asian Games	Palembang, Indonesia	1st	10,000 m	34:52.74
2011	Southeast Asian Games	Palembang, Indonesia	1st	Marathon	2:45:35
2012	Olympic Games	London, United Kingdom	84th	Marathon	2:41:15
2013	Southeast Asian Games	Naypyidaw, Myanmar	2nd	5000 m	16:24.36
2013	Southeast Asian Games	Naypyidaw, Myanmar	1st	10,000 m	34:32.68
2015	Southeast Asian Games	Singapore	1st	5000 m	16:18.06
2015	Southeast Asian Games	Singapore	1st	10,000 m	33:44.53
2017	Islamic Solidarity Games	Baku, Azerbaijan	8th	5000 m	17:57.52
