= Rini Budiarti =

Indonesian athletics competitor (born 1983)

Personal information
- Born: 1983 (age 42–43)
Medal record
Women's athletics
Representing Indonesia
Southeast Asian Games
Gold medal – first place	2011 Jakarta–Palembang	3000 m
Gold medal – first place	2013 Naypyidaw	3000 m
Gold medal – first place	2015 Singapore	3000 m
Silver medal – second place	2007 Nakhon Ratchasima	1500 m
Silver medal – second place	2007 Nakhon Ratchasima	5000 m
Silver medal – second place	2015 Singapore	5000 m
Bronze medal – third place	2005 Manila	5000 m
Bronze medal – third place	2011 Palembeng	5000 m

Rini Budiarti (born 1983) is an Indonesian long-distance runner. She represented Indonesia at the 2014 Asian Games held in Incheon, South Korea. She competed in the women's 3000 metres steeplechase event and she finished in 5th place.

In 2015, she competed in the senior women's race at the 2015 IAAF World Cross Country Championships held in Guiyang, China. She finished in 76th place. In the same year, she also won the gold medal in the women's 3000 metres steeplechase and the silver medal in the women's 5000 metres event at the 2015 Southeast Asian Games held in Singapore.
