= Viktoriya Yalovtseva =

Kazakhstani middle-distance runner

Medal record

Women's athletics

Representing Kazakhstan

Asian Indoor Championships
Silver medal – second place	2008 Doha	4×400 m

Viktoriya Aleksandrovna Yalovtseva (born 4 November 1977) is a Kazakhstani runner who specializes in the 800 metres.

She has had success on the regional level. She finished fifth at the 2005 Asian Championships, won the bronze medal at the 2005 Asian Indoor Games and the 2006 Asian Indoor Championships, the silver medal at the 2006 Asian Games, finished fourth at the 2007 Asian Indoor Games and won the bronze medal at the 2009 Asian Indoor Games. In the 4 x 400 metres relay event she won a silver medal at the 2008 Asian Indoor Championships and a gold medal at the 2009 Asian Indoor Games. She competed at the 2010 World Indoor Championships.

Her outdoor personal best in the event is 2:00.57 achieved in June 2011 in Bishkek, while her personal best indoor time is 2:03.74 minutes, achieved in November 2009 in Hanoi.

== Competition record ==
Year	Competition	Venue	Position	Event	Notes
Representing Kazakhstan
2005	Universiade	İzmir, Turkey	14th (sf)	800 m	2:08.02
2005	Asian Championships	Incheon, South Korea	5th	800 m	2:07.18
2005	Asian Indoor Games	Bangkok, Thailand	3rd	800 m	2:09.05
2006	Asian Indoor Championships	Pattaya, Thailand	3rd	800 m	2:08.92
2006	Asian Indoor Championships	Pattaya, Thailand	1st	4 × 400 m relay	3:41.39
2006	Asian Games	Doha, Qatar	2nd	800 m	2:03.19
2006	Asian Games	Doha, Qatar	2nd	4 × 400 m relay	3:33.86
2007	Asian Indoor Games	Macau	4th	800 m	2:07.79
2008	Asian Indoor Championships	Doha, Qatar	5th	800 m	2:06.00
2008	Asian Indoor Championships	Doha, Qatar	2nd	4 × 400 m relay	3:38.10
2009	Asian Indoor Games	Hanoi, Vietnam	3rd	800 m	2:03.74
2009	Asian Indoor Games	Hanoi, Vietnam	1st	4 × 400 m relay	3:39.21
2009	Asian Championships	Guangzhou, China	8th	800 m	2:10.03
2009	Asian Championships	Guangzhou, China	4th	4 × 400 m relay	3:36.54
2010	World Indoor Championships	Doha, Qatar	13th (h)	800 m	2:05.68
2010	Asian Games	Guangzhou, China	7th (h)	800 m	2:04.27
2010	Asian Games	Guangzhou, China	2nd	4 × 400 m relay	3:30.03 (NR)
2011	Asian Championships	Kobe, Japan	5th	800 m	2:04.66
2011	World Championships	Daegu, South Korea	–	4 × 400 m relay	DNF
