= Sagardeep Kaur =

Indian sprinter (1981–2016)

Medal record

Women's athletics

Representing India

Asian Championships
Gold medal – first place	2002 Colombo	4×400 m

Sagardeep Kaur (24 September 1981 – 23 November 2016) was an Indian athlete who won a gold medal in the women's 4x400 metres relay in the 2002 Asian Athletics Championships. Competing at the 2003 World Championships, the Indian team in the 4 × 400 metres relay was knocked out after the initial heat, where they finished in the last place.

Her personal best time in the 400 metres was 52.50 seconds, achieved in June 2004 in Chennai.

On 23 November 2016, she died in a road accident near Guhla, in the Kaithal district of Haryana. At the time of her death, she was a sub-inspector in the Punjab Police. She had two daughters Neerat Singh, and Avneet Singh with her husband Satnam Singh, an athletics coach.
