= Hamida Al-Habsi =

Omani athletics competitor

Medal record

Women's athletics

Representing Oman

Asian Indoor Championships
| Bronze medal – third place | 2006 Pattaya | Shot put |

Hamida Al-Habsi (Arabic: حميدة الحبسي) (born 22 August 1987) is an Omani shot putter and discus thrower. In September 2005, she participated in the Islamic Women's Games in Tehran where she threw a distance of 10.24 metres (33.6 ft), becoming a national record for Omani women. In February 2006, she competed at the Indoor Asia Championships in Pattaya, Thailand, where she achieved her personal best indoor record of 9.87 metres (32.4 ft). In December 2011, Al-Habsi finished 4th out of 5 in the discus at the Pan Arab Games in the Qatari capital of Doha.
