= Iryna Charnushenka-Stasiuk =

Belarusian long jumper

Personal information
- Nationality: Belarus
- Born: 9 March 1979 Slutsk, Byelorussian SSR, Soviet Union (now Belarus)
- Died: 5 December 2013 (aged 34)
- Height: 1.75 m (5 ft 9 in)
- Weight: 52 kg (115 lb)

Sport
- Sport: Athletics
- Event: Long jump

Achievements and titles
- Personal best: Long jump: 6.74 m (2008)

Iryna Charnushenka-Stasiuk (Belarusian: Ірына Стасюк-Чарнушэнка; 9 March 1979 – 5 December 2013) was a Belarusian long jumper. She was born in Slutsk, Minsk Region. Charnushenka-Stasiuk represented Belarus at the 2008 Summer Olympics in Beijing, where she competed for the women's long jump, along with her compatriot Volha Siarheyenka. She performed the best jump of 6.48 metres in her first attempt, despite having received two fouls throughout the entire qualifying round. Charnushenka-Stasiuk, however, failed to advance into the final, as she placed eighteenth out of forty-two athletes in the overall rankings. On December 5, 2013 she died of cancer at the age of 34.
