= Athletics at the 2015 SEA Games – Women's 3000 metres steeplechase =

The women's 3000 metres steeplechase at the 2015 SEA Games was held in National Stadium, Singapore. The track and field events took place on June 12.

== Schedule ==
All times are (UTC+08:00)

Date	Time	Event
Friday, 12 June 2015	17:00	Final

== Records ==
Prior to this competition, the existing world, Asian, and Southeast Asian Games records were as follows.

World Record	Gulnara Samitova-Galkina (RUS)	8:58.81	Beijing, China	17 August 2008
Asian Record	Ruth Jebet (BHR)	9:20.55	Zürich, Switzerland	28 August 2014
Games Record	Rini Budiarti (INA)	10:00.58	Palembang, Indonesia	12 November 2011

== Results ==
Legend

- SB — Seasonal Best
- PB — Personal Best
- NR — National Record

Rank	Athlete	Time	Note	
1st place, gold medalist(s)	Rini Budiarti (INA)	10:20.40		Video on YouTube Official Video
2nd place, silver medalist(s)	Nguyen Thi Phuong (VIE)	10:32.61		Video on YouTube Official Video
3rd place, bronze medalist(s)	Jessica Lynn Barnard (PHI)	10:36.90	PB	Video on YouTube Official Video
4	Truong Thi Thuy Khieu (VIE)	10:40.54	SB	Video on YouTube Official Video
5	Khin Mar Se (MYA)	10:52.75	NR	Video on YouTube Official Video
6	Hnin Yu Soe (MYA)	11:06.45		Video on YouTube Official Video
7	Cheryl Chan Xue Rou (SIN)	11:45.16	NR	Video on YouTube Official Video
8	Eliza Ng Yu Jun (SIN)	12:14.91	PB	Video on YouTube Official Video
9	Chansouk Minghamkyong (LAO)	12:49.64		Video on YouTube Official Video
