= 2006 Asian Indoor Athletics Championships =

2006 Asian Indoor Championships
- Dates: February 10–12
- Host city: Pattaya, Thailand
- Venue: Indoor Athletics Stadium
- Events: 26
- Participation: 192 athletes from 25 nations

The 2006 Asian Indoor Athletics Championships was an international indoor athletics event took place in Pattaya, Thailand, between 10 and 12 February. This was the first edition to be hosted in the country. A total of 24 nations sent athletes to compete at the championships, which featured 26 track and field events.

Kazakhstan topped the medal table with seven golds. China was second with six golds while Japan finished third with four golds.

== Results ==
=== Men ===
Event	Gold		Silver		Bronze	
60 m	Gong Wei; China	6.64; CR	Wachara Sondee; Thailand	6.65; NR	Vyacheslav Muravyev; Kazakhstan	6.67
400 m	Mohammed Al-Rawahi; Oman	47.90; CR, NR	Jukkatip Pojaroen; Thailand	48.62	Yevgeniy Meleshenko; Kazakhstan	48.65
800 m	Salem Amer Al-Badri; Qatar	1:50.93	Adam Ali; Qatar	1:51.29	Ghamanda Ram; India	1:51.45
1500 m	Daham Najim Bashir; Qatar	3:44.04; CR	Saleh Marzouk; Bahrain	3:46.29	Pritam Bind; India	3:47.23
3000 m	Saif Saaeed Shaheen; Qatar	7:39.77; AR	Tareq Mubarak Taher; Bahrain	7:49.84	Aadam Ismaeel Khamis; Bahrain	7:50.10
60 m hurdles	Liu Lilu; China	7.79	Chen Ming; China	7.84	Mohd Faiz Mohamed; Malaysia	7.91 NR
4x400 m relay	Thailand; Jukkatip Pojaroen; Banjong Lachua; Tulapong Sutaso; Supachai Phachsay	3:15.53; CR	None awarded		None awarded	
High jump	Naoyuki Daigo; Japan	2.17	Salem Nasser; Bahrain	2.13	Huang Haiqiang; China	2.13
Pole vault	Daichi Sawano; Japan	5.60; CR	Yang Yansheng; China	5.40	Aleksandr Akhmedov; Kazakhstan	5.30
Long jump	Zhang Xin; China	7.76	Daisuke Arakawa; Japan	7.75	Saleh Al-Haddad; Kuwait	7.52
Triple jump	Roman Valiyev; Kazakhstan	16.24	Mohammad Hazouri; Syria	16.20	Yevgeniy Ektov; Kazakhstan	15.93
Shot put	Sarayudh Pinitjit; Thailand	17.49; NR	Mashari Mohammad; Kuwait	17.29	Sergey Rubtsov; Kazakhstan	16.89
Heptathlon	Pavel Dubitskiy; Kazakhstan	5619 pts CR	Hsiao Szu-pin; Chinese Taipei	5563 pts NR	Pavel Andreev; Uzbekistan	5421 pts
WR world record | AR area record | CR championship record | GR games record | NR national record | OR Olympic record | PB personal best | SB season best | WL world leading (in a given season)

=== Women ===
Event	Gold		Silver		Bronze	
60 m	Nongnuch Sanrat; Thailand	7.48	Sangwan Jaksunin; Thailand	7.54	Orranut Klomdee; Thailand	7.59
400 m	Anna Gavriushenko; Kazakhstan	54.89	Saowalee Kaewchuay; Thailand	55.15	Marina Ivanova; Kazakhstan	57.26
800 m	Zamira Amirova; Uzbekistan	2:07.01; CR	Sinimol Paulose; India	2:07.39	Viktoriya Yalovtseva; Kazakhstan	2:08.92
1500 m	Sinimol Paulose; India	4:18.29; CR	O. P. Jaisha; India	4:18.50	Svetlana Lukasheva; Kazakhstan	4:19.50
3000 m	Zhu Xiaolin; China	9:25.60; CR	Sun Weiwei; China	9:25.69	O. P. Jaisha; India	9:26.72
60 m hurdles	Zhang Rong; China	8.40	Natalya Ivoninskaya; Kazakhstan	8.49	Dedeh Erawati; Indonesia	8.54
4x400 m relay	Kazakhstan; Svetlana Lukasheva; Marina Ivanova; Viktoriya Yalovtseva; Anna Gavriushenko	3:41.39; CR	Thailand; Yuangjan Panthakarn; Saowalee Kaewchuay; Sunantha Kinnareewong; Wassana Winatho	3:42.28	India; Korda Maridula; Sinimol Paulose; Rupinder Kaur; C. Bhubneshwari	3:53.24
High jump	Marina Aitova; Kazakhstan	1.93; CR	Tatyana Efimenko; Kyrgyzstan	1.91	Svetlana Radzivil; Uzbekistan	1.91
Pole vault	Ikuko Nishikori; Japan	4.20 =CR	Mami Nakano; Japan	4.10	Sun Lei; China	4.00
Long jump	Maho Hanaoka; Japan	6.40; CR	Anju Bobby George; India	6.32	Olesya Belyayeva; Kazakhstan	6.29
Triple jump	Yelena Parfenova; Kazakhstan	13.91; CR	Olesya Belyayeva; Kazakhstan	13.33	Thitima Muangjan; Thailand	12.64
Shot put	Qian Chunhua; China	17.12	Juttaporn Krasaeyan; Thailand	15.34	Hamida Al-Habsi; Oman	9.87
Pentathlon	Olga Rypakova; Kazakhstan	4582 pts AR	Liu Haili; China	4220 pts	Wassana Winatho; Thailand	4168 pts
WR world record | AR area record | CR championship record | GR games record | NR national record | OR Olympic record | PB personal best | SB season best | WL world leading (in a given season)

== Medal table ==
Rank	Nation	Gold	Silver	Bronze	Total
1	Kazakhstan	7	2	9	18
2	China	6	4	2	12
3	Japan	4	2	0	6
4	Thailand	3	6	3	12
5	Qatar	3	1	0	4
6	India	1	3	4	8
7	Uzbekistan	1	0	2	3
8	Oman	1	0	1	2
9	Bahrain	0	3	1	4
10	Kuwait	0	1	1	2
11	Chinese Taipei	0	1	0	1
11	Kyrgyzstan	0	1	0	1
11	Syria	0	1	0	1
14	Indonesia	0	0	1	1
14	Malaysia	0	0	1	1
Totals (15 entries)		26	25	25	76

== Participating nations ==
A total of 25 nations were represented by athletes competing at the 2006 championships.

- Bahrain (5)
- Cambodia (5)
- China (19)
- Chinese Taipei (6)
- Hong Kong (5)
- India (11)
- Indonesia (5)
- Iraq (2)
- Japan (12)
- Jordan (2)
- Kazakhstan (18)
- Kuwait (8)
- Kyrgyzstan (2)
- Laos (5)
- Lebanon (3)
- Malaysia (9)
- Maldives (2)
- Oman (2)
- Pakistan (2)
- Qatar (6)
- Singapore (6)
- Syria (2)
- Tajikistan (3)
- Thailand (46)
- Uzbekistan (6)
