= Santhi Soundarajan =

Indian athlete (born 1981)

Personal information
- Nationality: Indian
- Born: 17 April 1981 (age 45) Kathakkurichi, Tamil Nadu, India
- Education: NIS, Sports Authority of India (SAI), Bangalore
- Height: 1.70 m (5 ft 7 in)
- Weight: 64 kg (141 lb)

Sport
- Sport: Running
- Events: 800 metres, 1500 metres

Achievements and titles
- Personal bests: 800m: 2:02.21; 1500m: 4:11.66; National record 3000m: 10:44.76; All India Inter University Record Holder 800m: 2:07.68
Medal record
Women's athletics
Representing India
Asian Games
Disqualified	2006 Doha	800 m
South Asian Games
Gold medal – first place	2006 Colombo	1500 m
Gold medal – first place	2006 Colombo	4×400 m relay
Silver medal – second place	2006 Colombo	800 m
Asian Indoor Games
Gold medal – first place	2005 Bangkok	4×400 m relay
Gold medal – first place	2005 Bangkok	800 m
Asian Athletics Championships
Silver medal – second place	2005 Incheon	800 m
Asian Grand Prix
Silver medal – second place	2004 Asian Grand Prix, Bangalore	800 m
Silver medal – second place	2004 Asian Grand Prix, Pune	800 m
International Peace Sports Festival
Gold medal – first place	International Peace Sports Festival 2003	5000 m
Silver medal – second place	International Peace Sports Festival 2003	800 m
Bronze medal – third place	International Peace Sports Festival 2003	400 m

Santhi Soundarajan (also spelled Shanthi Soundararajan, born 17 April 1981) is a track and field athlete from Tamil Nadu, India. She is the winner of 12 international medals for India and around 50 medals for her home state of Tamil Nadu. Soundarajan is the first Tamil woman to win a medal at the Asian Games. She competes in middle-distance track events. She was stripped of her silver medal won at the 2006 Asian Games after failing a sex verification test which disputed her eligibility to participate in the women's competition.

== Early life and career ==
Santhi Soundarajan was born 17 April 1981 in the Pudukkottai District of Tamil Nadu, India. Soundarajan grew up in a 20-by-5-foot hut where there was no running water, electricity, or a bathroom or outhouse. She was the eldest of five children born to her parents, who are both brick-kiln labourers; her parents often had to seek work in other brickyards where they earned the equivalent of $4 US dollars a week. While they were away, Soundarajan was in charge of taking care of her four younger siblings, often with the help of Soundarajan's grandfather, who was an accomplished runner himself. When she was 13, Soundajaran's grandfather taught her how to run properly and bought her a pair shoes to help her advance with her running. Soundajaran recalls that her grandfather had always been her "biggest supporter."

Although Soundarajan suffered from malnutrition as a child, she was able to become a middle-distance runner in her early teens, at first to earn money from competitions to help her family. Soundarajan won a tin cup in her eighth-grade competition debut; at interschool competitions over time, she added 13 more cups to her collection. Her dominant performances caught the attention of a nearby high school's sports coach, who recruited her. In addition to paying her tuition, the school provided her a uniform and hot lunches. This was Soundarajan's first experience eating three meals a day, which helped her improve.

After high school, Santhi got a scholarship from an arts college in Pudukkottai, the nearest town. The following year, Santhi transferred to a college in Chennai, Tamil Nadu's capital, which was seven hours away. In 2005, she attended the Asian Athletics Championships in Incheon, South Korea, where she won a silver medal. In 2006, she was chosen to represent India at the Asian Games (run by the Olympic Council of Asia). In the 800 meters, Santhi took the silver in 2 minutes, 3.16 seconds, beating Viktoriya Yalovtseva of Kazakhstan by 0.03 seconds. This win led to Santhi becoming embroiled in an ongoing, unresolved debate over what makes an athlete eligible to compete in the women's division.

In 2004 Santhi was awarded 1 lakh cash from then Tamil Nadu Chief Minister Jayalalithaa.

Santhi holds the national record for the women's 3000 metres steeplechase clocking 10:44.65 seconds. At a 2005 national meet in Bangalore, she won the 800m, 1,500m and 3000m. She won the silver medal in 800m at the 2005 Asian Championships in Incheon, South Korea.

== Asian Games controversy ==
Santhi won a silver medal in the women's 800m race at the 2006 Asian Games held in Doha, Qatar clocking 2 minutes, 3.16 seconds. However, she underwent a sex test shortly afterwards, and the results indicated that she "does not possess the sexual characteristics of a woman". While such sex tests are not compulsory for competitors, the International Association of Athletics Federations can request that contenders take such tests at any time, and include intensive evaluation by a gynecologist, a geneticist, an endocrinologist, a psychologist, and an internal medicine specialist. Reports initially suggested that her upbringing in impoverished rural India, where she reportedly only started eating proper meals in 2004, could be a factor behind the test result. In a 2016 video petition, Santhi Soundarajan disclosed that she has been told she has androgen insensitivity syndrome.

Five days after the news report, Santhi says, she received a call from Lalit Bhanot, a former joint secretary of the Indian Olympic Association. Bhanot spoke to Santhi in English. "He told Santhi she can't do sports anymore,'. When she asked why, she was told: It's been confirmed, Santhi cannot compete in sports." Soon after the results of the sex test came out, she was stripped of her silver medal.

Santhi returned to her village in humiliation and promptly fell into serious depression. Months later, she tried to kill herself by ingesting a type of poison used by veterinarians. A friend found her vomiting uncontrollably and took her to a hospital.

== Later life ==
In January 2007, the Tamil Nadu Chief Minister Karunanidhi awarded Santhi a television set and a cash prize of Rs. 1.5 million for her Doha Games effort, despite the fallout of Santhi failing a gender test. Santhi spent her reward money on her students; there are an average of 68 (trainees) and none of them is charged any fee.

Santhi's application to the state-run railways for a job before the games was turned down because the athlete failed a gender test.

In September 2007, Santhi was reported to have attempted suicide, reportedly by consuming a veterinary drug at her residence. The attempt was blamed on gender, economic, and sports pressure in India.

Two months later, Santhi took up coaching, starting a training academy at her home district of Pudukkottai, and became a temporary athletics coach with the regional government. By 2009, her academy had 68 students and her students had won the first and third positions in the Chennai marathon.

Santhi was admitted to the NIS athletic coach diploma course in Bangalore in 2013. Santhi was one of the 24 coaches in athletics, out of the 108 students who attended the course in eight disciplines. on 30 April 2014 she became a qualified athletics coach, being awarded the NIS diploma certificate at the Sports Authority of India graduation ceremony in Bangalore. Santhi didn't have a permanent job at that time. Commenting on Santhi's situation at the time, Olympic shooter Anjali Bhagwat said: "It's sad that such thing has happened in our society.

In December 2014, with the help of intersex rights activist Gopi Shankar Madurai, Santhi met Pon. Radhakrishnan, Minister of State for Road Transport and Highways, Olympic silver medallist Rajyavardhan Singh Rathore, Minister of State for Information Technology and Broadcasting, and Union Sports and Youth Affairs Minister Sarbananda Sonowal in New Delhi to present a request for assistance securing a permanent job as an athletics coach, and in restoring her 800m silver medal from the 2006 Doha Asian Games.

Radhakrishnan, a political heavyweight from Tamil Nadu, in turn, wrote to Sports Minister Sarbananda Sonowal to release a cash award to Santhi, but the Ministry's response was unfavorable: she was informed through a letter that since the medal has not been restored to her, the Ministry cannot give a Rs 10 lakh cash award for the medal. Also, the Ministry does not provide or recommend jobs in central/state government offices.

"My legacy will remain not with my medals but with the determination and hope to overcome my past torment and my present struggles, I want to live my dream through my students."

Santhi told the BBC Tamil Service that the Indian authorities had not fought her case after she was stripped of her silver medal at the 2006 Asian Games in Doha.

On 29 July 2015, the Madras High Court directed the State government to consider Santhi's plea for relaxation in educational qualifications and help her become a coach at the Sports Development Authority of Tamil Nadu (SDATN). As per the notification issued by the Youth Welfare and Sports Development in April 2015, an applicant contesting for the post of the coach should have an education qualification of a bachelor's degree and Santhi did not have one. Justice D. Hariparanthaman directed the Secretary of the Youth Welfare and Sports Development to "consider her claim for the post of coach by granting requisite relaxation as a special case", in the light of the documents produced by her in the sports area and pass appropriate orders within six weeks.

On 27 September 2016 the National Commission for Scheduled Castes (NCSC) served a notice on the Ministry of Youth Affairs and Sports in response to a petition filed by Santhi. The NCSC investigated allegations of injustice and sought a response in the matter from the secretary of the Department of Sports within 30 days.

On 16 October 2016 Santhi was informed that the State government decided to appoint her as a permanent athletic coach under Sports Development Authority of Tamil Nadu. Tamil Nadu Sports Minister K. Pandiarajan said the State will plead her case with the International Court of Arbitration for Sport. He also stated that the Tamil Nadu Government will write to SAI, Indian Olympic Association and Athletics Federation of India to take up Santhi's case in that forum.

Santhi received her appointment order for a permanent athletic coach under SDAT on 20 December 2016 from Tamil Nadu Sports Minister K. Pandiarajan at the Fort St. George, India.

On 3 January 2017 Gopi Shankar Madurai who is closely working with Santhi said she will file a human rights violation case against Athletic Federation of India and Indian Olympic Association at Madras High Court or the Apex of India.

On 16 February 2017 The National Human Rights Commission of India rejected Santhi's complaint and claimed that it was too late to accept it.

== Achievements and honours ==
Santhi has won 12 international medals and 50 national medals, including:

- Gold Medal – 2005 Asian Indoor Games – 4x400 relay
- Gold Medal – 2005 Asian Indoor Games – 800 meters
- Silver Medal – 2006 Asian Games- 800 meters
- Gold Medal – 2006 South Asian Games – 1500 meters
- Gold Medal – 2006 South Asian Games – 4x400 relay
- Gold Medal – 2003 International Peace Sports Festival – 5000 meters
- Silver Medal – 2006 South Asian Games – 800 meters
- Silver Medal – 2005 Asian Athletics Championships – 800 meters
- Silver Medal – 2004 Asian Grand Prix, Bangalore – 800 meters
- Silver Medal – 2004 Asian Grand Prix, Pune – 800 meters
- Silver Medal – 2003 International Peace Sports Festival – 800 meters
- Bronze Medal – 2003 International Peace Sports Festival – 400 meters

Year	Award	Honouring body	Notes
2016	Young Inspirational Women Leader Award	World Women Leadership Congress (WWLC)	Awarded for her contributions towards increasing the participation of young Tamil girls in Athletics.

Year	Title	Honouring body	Notes
2017	Living Phoenix	Kurukshetra (college festival) by College of Engineering, Guindy, Anna University.	Conferred on her for Santhi's remarkable contributions in the field of Athletics.

== IAAF policy and support for other athletes ==
Santhi's case has been contrasted with that of Caster Semenya of South Africa, also a middle-distance runner, who nearly lost the gold she won at the 2009 Berlin World Championship after she failed a similar gender test. Semenya's nation rallied around her to safeguard her dignity, her rights and position in world sports. She was also her country's flag-bearer at the London Olympics 2012. Santhi supported Semenya, fearing that Semenya would face the same humiliation that she did.

Santhi also extended her support to Dutee Chand and said the youngster should not be victimized. She also expressed her dismay at the lack of sensitivity in the handling of the Dutee Chand issue, fearing that the young athlete's future may have now been jeopardized. Santhi demanded that all steps be taken to ensure the 18-year-old's return to the track.

Welcoming the Court of Arbitration for Sport's ruling in favour of Chand on 27 July 2015 for suspending gender test, the landmark ruling has also fuelled Santhi's hopes of regaining the silver medal and the Rs 10-lakh prize money from the central government which was withheld after the gender test row.

In this regard, it is notable that the IAAF policy, suspended as a result of Chand's case, did not prevent Santhi from competing. Kalra, Kulshreshtha and Unnikrishnan, writing in the Indian Journal of Endocrinology and Metabolism in 2012, stated that "Chromosomal sex, used to disqualify Santhi in 2010, is not mentioned at all in the current guidelines." Immediately prior to the 2016 Olympic Games and in response to sex verification controversies, Genel, Simpson and de la Chapelle in the Journal of the American Medical Association stated "One of the fundamental recommendations published almost 25 years ago ... that athletes born with a disorder of sex development and raised as females be allowed to compete as women remains appropriate".

== In popular culture ==
In 2006, Amitabh Bachchan raised a question on Santhi in the show Kaun Banega Crorepati 2 he hosted.

The character of Valli in the Tamil film Ethir Neechal is a tribute to Santhi.

In August 2016 Thappad, an online platform and mobile application, made a video as part of an online campaign that is asking for Santhi's name to be included in the official records again and that the government should give her a permanent job to rebuild her life.

Put Chutney Rajmohan Arumugam, under the banner of Culture Machine Media Pvt Ltd, made a video in Tamil to explain the significance of her struggle to residents of Tamil Nadu.

== See also ==
- Sex verification in sports
- Androgen insensitivity syndrome
- Ethir Neechal
