= Sinimole Paulose =

Indian middle-distance runner

Medal record

Women's athletics

Representing India

Asian Championships
Gold medal – first place	2007 Amman	1500 m
Silver medal – second place	2007 Amman	800 m

Asian Indoor Championships
Gold medal – first place	2006 Pattaya	1500 m
Gold medal – first place	2008 Doha	800 m
Gold medal – first place	2008 Doha	1500 m
Silver medal – second place	2006 Pattaya	800 m
Bronze medal – third place	2006 Pattaya	4×400 m

Sini A Markose (Sinimole Paulose) is an Indian middle-distance runner born in Pampakuda, Ernakulam district of Kerala state, who had won 39 international medals and participated in three Asian Games (2006, 2010 & 2014) in her athletic career so far.

She conferred with the prestigious Arjuna Award for her outstanding performance in the field of Athletics in 2009.

Her major accolades include Five Asian Championship Titles (indoor & outdoor) in 800m and 1500m running and an Asian Games Bronze medal in 1500m running.

In 2010 she was 9th at the Commonwealth Games in the 800 metres.

She is the current Asian Indoor Athletics Championships Record holder in 800m & 1500m running.

== Major International Medals ==
No. Event 1500 m 800 m

1 Asian Indoor Games, Thailand, 2005 Bronze
2 Asian Indoor championships, Thailand, 2006 Gold-New Asian Record Silver
3 Asian Games, Doha, 2006 Bronze
4 Asian Grandprix -I, Bangkok, 2007 Gold
5 Asian Grandprix -II, Gowhati, 2007 Gold
6 Asian Grandprix -III, Pune, 2007 Gold

4 Asian Track & Field Championships, Jordan, 2007 Gold Silver 6 Asian Indoor Games, Macau, China, 2007 Gold Silver 7 Asian Indoor Championships, Doha, 2008 Gold-New Asian Record Gold-New Asian Record 8 South Asian Championships, Cochin, 2008 Gold Gold- Best Athlete 9 Asian All Star Meet Bhopal, 2008 Gold 10 British MC Gold Race, Watford, UK, 2008 Gold 11 European Granprix, Stockholm, Sweden, 2008 Bronze 12 European Grand Prix, Cork, Irland, 2008 Gold 13 Asian All Star Meet, Delhi, 2010 Gold Silver 14 Asian Grandprix - Thailand, 2012 Silver 15 Savo Games, Laphinlahthi, Finland, 2012 Silver 16 Savo Games, Laphinlahthi, Finland, 2013 Bronze 17 Memorial Rasschert, Ninove, Belgium, 2013 Gold 18 Kuortane Games, Finland, 2013 Bronze 19 Flanders Cup, Huizingen, Belgium, 2014 Gold 20 Brussels Grand Prix, Brussels, Belgium, 2014 Silver 21 Kuortane Games, Finland, 2014 Silver 22 Asian Games, Incheon, 2014 4th
