= Athletics at the 2010 Asian Games – Men's 400 metres =

Men's 400 metres at the 2010 Asian Games
- Venue: Aoti Main Stadium
- Dates: 21–22 November 2010
- Competitors: 18 from 11 nations

Medalists
gold medal	Femi Ogunode	Qatar
silver medal	Yuzo Kanemaru	Japan
bronze medal	Yousef Masrahi	Saudi Arabia

The men's 400 metres event at the 2010 Asian Games was held at the Aoti Main Stadium, Guangzhou, China on 21–22 November.

== Schedule ==
All times are China Standard Time (UTC+08:00)

Date	Time	Event
Sunday, 21 November 2010	19:05	Round 1
Monday, 22 November 2010	18:00	Final

== Records ==
Prior to this competition, the existing world, Asian and Games records were as follows.

World Record	Michael Johnson (USA)	43.18	Seville, Spain	26 August 1999
Asian Record	Mohammed Al-Malki (OMA)	44.56	Budapest, Hungary	12 August 1988
Games Record	Ibrahim Ismail Muftah (QAT); Fawzi Al-Shammari (KUW)	44.93	Hiroshima, Japan; Busan, South Korea	11 October 1994; 9 October 2002

== Results ==
Legend

- DSQ — Disqualified

=== Round 1 ===
- Qualification: First 2 in each heat (Q) and the next 2 fastest (q) advance to the final.

==== Heat 1 ====
Rank	Athlete	Time	Notes
1	Ismail Al-Sabiani (KSA)	46.25	Q
2	Prasanna Amarasekara (SRI)	46.35	Q
3	Yusuke Ishitsuka (JPN)	46.66	q
4	S. K. Mortaja (IND)	46.75	
5	Choi Myung-jun (KOR)	48.09	
—	Arnon Jaiaree (THA)	DSQ	

==== Heat 2 ====
Rank	Athlete	Time	Notes
1	Yuzo Kanemaru (JPN)	46.33	Q
2	Liu Xiaosheng (CHN)	46.76	Q
3	Reza Bouazar (IRI)	46.80	
4	Bibin Mathew (IND)	46.93	
5	Lim Chan-ho (KOR)	47.06	
6	Heru Astriyanto (INA)	48.29	

==== Heat 3 ====
Rank	Athlete	Time	Notes
1	Yousef Masrahi (KSA)	45.48	Q
2	Femi Ogunode (QAT)	45.64	Q
3	Chang Pengben (CHN)	46.58	q
4	Sajjad Hashemi (IRI)	47.77	
5	Chanatip Ruckburee (THA)	48.91	
—	Fawzi Al-Shammari (IOC)	DSQ	

=== Final ===
Rank	Athlete	Time	Notes
1st place, gold medalist(s)	Femi Ogunode (QAT)	45.12	
2nd place, silver medalist(s)	Yuzo Kanemaru (JPN)	45.32	
3rd place, bronze medalist(s)	Yousef Masrahi (KSA)	45.71	
4	Liu Xiaosheng (CHN)	46.34	
5	Chang Pengben (CHN)	46.65	
6	Prasanna Amarasekara (SRI)	47.05	
7	Ismail Al-Sabiani (KSA)	47.11	
8	Yusuke Ishitsuka (JPN)	47.49	
