= Athletics at the 2010 Asian Games – Men's 4 × 400 metres relay =

Men's 4 × 400 metres relay at the 2010 Asian Games
- Venue: Aoti Main Stadium
- Dates: 23–26 November 2010
- Competitors: 42 from 9 nations

Medalists
gold medal	Saudi Arabia; Ismail Al-Sabiani, Mohammed Al-Salhi, Hamed Al-Bishi, Yousef Masrahi
silver medal	Japan; Yusuke Ishitsuka, Kenji Fujimitsu, Hideyuki Hirose, Yuzo Kanemaru
bronze medal	China; Lin Yang, Deng Shijie, Chang Pengben, Liu Xiaosheng

The men's 4 × 400 metres relay event at the 2010 Asian Games was held at the Aoti Main Stadium, Guangzhou, China on 23–26 November.

== Schedule ==
All times are China Standard Time (UTC+08:00)

Date	Time	Event
Tuesday, 23 November 2010	19:25	Round 1
Friday, 26 November 2010	20:00	Final

== Records ==
Prior to this competition, the existing world, Asian and Games records were as follows.

World Record	United States	2:54.29	Stuttgart, Germany	22 August 1993
Asian Record	Japan	3:00.76	Atlanta, United States	3 August 1996
Games Record	Japan	3:01.70	Bangkok, Thailand	19 December 1998

== Results ==
Legend

- DSQ — Disqualified

=== Round 1 ===
- Qualification: First 3 in each heat (Q) and the next 2 fastest (q) advance to the final.

==== Heat 1 ====
Rank	Team	Time	Notes
1	Saudi Arabia (KSA); Ismail Al-Sabiani; Mohammed Al-Bishi; Hamed Al-Bishi; Yousef Masrahi	3:06.25	Q
2	China (CHN); You Cheng; Lin Yang; Deng Shijie; Chang Pengben	3:06.62	Q
3	Thailand (THA); Nitat Kaewkhong; Arnon Jaiaree; Saharat Sammayan; Chanatip Ruckburee	3:15.62	Q
—	Iran (IRI); Reza Bouazar; Edvard Mangasar; Sajjad Hashemi; Amir Moradi	DSQ	

==== Heat 2 ====
Rank	Team	Time	Notes
1	Japan (JPN); Yusuke Ishitsuka; Hideyuki Hirose; Naohiro Kawakita; Yuzo Kanemaru	3:06.53	Q
2	India (IND); Jithin Paul; V. B. Bineesh; Premanand Jayakumar; S. K. Mortaja	3:07.00	Q
3	Sri Lanka (SRI); Prasanna Amarasekara; Rohitha Pushpakumara; Uditha Wickramasinghe; Kasun Seneviratne	3:07.52	Q
4	South Korea (KOR); Cho Sung-kwon; Lim Chan-ho; Choi Myung-jun; Lee Seung-yoon	3:09.49	q
—	Iraq (IRQ); Mohammed Hasan; Karim Tariq; Aymen Jasim; Karrar Abdul-Zahra	DSQ	

=== Final ===
Rank	Team	Time	Notes
1st place, gold medalist(s)	Saudi Arabia (KSA); Ismail Al-Sabiani; Mohammed Al-Salhi; Hamed Al-Bishi; Yousef Masrahi	3:02.30	
2nd place, silver medalist(s)	Japan (JPN); Yusuke Ishitsuka; Kenji Fujimitsu; Hideyuki Hirose; Yuzo Kanemaru	3:02.43	
3rd place, bronze medalist(s)	China (CHN); Lin Yang; Deng Shijie; Chang Pengben; Liu Xiaosheng	3:03.66	
4	India (IND); Kunhu Muhammed; Bibin Mathew; Premanand Jayakumar; S. K. Mortaja	3:06.49	
5	Sri Lanka (SRI); Prasanna Amarasekara; Rohitha Pushpakumara; Uditha Wickramasinghe; Kasun Seneviratne	3:07.97	
6	South Korea (KOR); Lim Chan-ho; Cho Sung-kwon; Choi Myung-jun; Lee Seung-yoon	3:09.97	
7	Thailand (THA); Nitat Kaewkhong; Saharat Sammayan; Somporn Chuaychat; Chanatip Ruckburee	3:12.18	
