= 2011 Asian Athletics Championships – Men's 400 metres =

The men's 400 metres at the 2011 Asian Athletics Championships was held at the Kobe Universiade Memorial Stadium on the 7 and 8 of July.

== Medalists ==
Gold	Yousef Ahmed Masrahi; Saudi Arabia
Silver	Hideyuki Hirose; Japan
Bronze	Yūzō Kanemaru; Japan

== Records ==
2011 Asian Athletics Championships
World record	Michael Johnson (USA)	43.18	Seville, Spain	26 August 1999
Asian record	Mohamed Amer Al-Malky (OMN)	44.56	Budapest, Hungary	12 August 1988
Championship record	Sugath Thilakaratne (SRI)	44.61	Fukuoka, Japan	1998

== Results ==
=== Round 1 ===
First 2 in each heat (Q) and 2 best performers (q) advanced to the Final.

Rank	Heat	Name	Nationality	Time	Notes
1	3	Ahmed Al-Marjibi	Oman	46.06	Q
2	2	Hideyuki Hirose	Japan	46.35	Q
3	3	Yousef Ahmed Masrahi	Saudi Arabia	46.47	Q
4	3	Yusuke Ishitsuka	Japan	46.58	q
5	3	Sajjad Hashemiahangari	Iran	46.79	q
6	1	Yuzo Kanemaru	Japan	46.84	Q
7	2	Park Bong-Go	South Korea	46.97	Q
8	1	Ismail Al-Sabani	Saudi Arabia	47.30	Q
9	1	Prasanna Sampath Amarasekara	Sri Lanka	47.31	
10	2	Shake Mortaja	India	47.63	
11	2	Hadi Rahimi	Iran	47.82	
12	1	Dmitriy Korobeynikov	Kazakhstan	47.88	
13	2	Heru Astriyanto	Indonesia	47.89	SB
13	3	Karar Al-Abbody	Iraq	47.89	SB
15	1	Obaid Al Quraini	Oman	48.11	
16	3	Yuvaraaj Panerselvam	Malaysia	48.17	
17	3	Hafiy Tajuddin Rositi	Brunei	49.81	PB
18	2	M. Tsetsegmaa	Mongolia	51.92	
19	1	Haji Muhammad Sukardi	Brunei	52.00	
20	1	Abdul Qahar Rahmati	Afghanistan	55.78	

=== Final ===
Rank	Lane	Name	Nationality	Time	Notes
1st place, gold medalist(s)	6	Yousef Ahmed Masrahi	Saudi Arabia	45.79	
2nd place, silver medalist(s)	4	Hideyuki Hirose	Japan	46.03	
3rd place, bronze medalist(s)	7	Yuzo Kanemaru	Japan	46.38	
4	2	Sajjad Hashemiahangari	Iran	46.53	
5	3	Yusuke Ishitsuka	Japan	46.53	
6	8	Ismail Al-Sabani	Saudi Arabia	47.15	
	9	Park Bong-Go	South Korea	DNF	
	5	Ahmed Al-Marjibi	Oman	DQ	FS
