= 2009 Asian Athletics Championships – Men's 400 metres =

The men's 400 metres event at the 2009 Asian Athletics Championships was held at the Guangdong Olympic Stadium on November 10–11.

== Medalists ==
Gold	Silver	Bronze
Liu Xiaosheng; China	Yuzo Kanemaru; Japan	Ismail Al-Sabani; Saudi Arabia

== Results ==
=== Heats ===
Rank	Heat	Name	Nationality	Time	Notes
1	2	Yuzo Kanemaru	Japan	46.15	Q
2	2	Liu Xiaosheng	China	46.17	Q
3	3	Bibin Mathew	India	46.59	Q
4	3	Reza Bouazar	Iran	46.62	Q, SB
5	2	Mortaja Shake	India	46.98	q
6	3	Rohitha Imiya Mudiyanse	Sri Lanka	47.03	q
7	1	Ismail Al-Sabani	Saudi Arabia	47.16	Q
8	1	Hideyuki Hirose	Japan	47.32	Q
9	3	Sergey Zaikov	Kazakhstan	47.47	
10	1	Chanatip Ruckburee	Thailand	47.67	
11	2	Jukkatip Pojaroen	Thailand	47.78	
12	1	Boris Khamzin	Kazakhstan	47.84	
13	1	Mohd Zafril Mohd Zuslaini	Malaysia	47.88	
14	1	Julius Felicisimo Nierras Jr.	Philippines	48.07	
15	1	Zhou Jie	China	48.28	
16	2	Panerselvam Yuvaaraj	Malaysia	48.71	
17	2	Saud Mohamed	United Arab Emirates	49.00	
18	3	Farkhod Kuralov	Tajikistan	49.42	PB
	2	Prasanna Amarasekara	Sri Lanka	DQ	
	3	Femi Seun Ogunode	Qatar	DNS	

=== Final ===
Rank	Lane	Name	Nationality	Time	Notes
1st place, gold medalist(s)	4	Liu Xiaosheng	China	46.55	
2nd place, silver medalist(s)	3	Yuzo Kanemaru	Japan	46.60	
3rd place, bronze medalist(s)	6	Ismail Al-Sabani	Saudi Arabia	46.84	
4	5	Bibin Mathew	India	47.03	
5	1	Mortaja Shake	India	47.36	F1
6	2	Rohitha Imiya Mudiyanse	Sri Lanka	47.41	
7	7	Reza Bouazar	Iran	47.46	F2
8	8	Hideyuki Hirose	Japan	48.52	
