= 2009 Asian Athletics Championships – Men's 4 × 400 metres relay =

The men's 4 × 400 metres relay event at the 2009 Asian Athletics Championships was held at the Guangdong Olympic Stadium on November 14.

== Results ==
Rank	Team	Name	Time	Notes
1st place, gold medalist(s)	Japan	Kenji Fujimitsu, Kenji Narisako, Hideyuki Hirose, Yuzo Kanemaru	3:04.13	SB
2nd place, silver medalist(s)	China	Zhou Jie, Cui Haojing, Wang Youxin, Liu Xiaosheng	3:06.60	
3rd place, bronze medalist(s)	India	Harpreet Singh, Bibin Mathew, Bineesh Valliayampoikayil Baby, Mortaja Shake	3:06.83	
4	Saudi Arabia	Hamed Al-Bishi, Bandar Sharahili, Mohammed Shaween, Ismail Al-Sabani	3:06.95	
5	Sri Lanka	Uditha Gayan Wickramasinghe, Rohitha Imiya Mudiyanse, Kasun Kalhar Seneviratne, Prasanna Amarasekara	3:07.99	
6	Thailand	Chanatip Ruckburee, Jukkatip Pojaroen, Supachai Phachsay, Suppachai Chimdee	3:08.63	
7	Malaysia	Muhammad Idris Zakaria, Mohd Zafril Zuslaini, Panerselvam Yuvaaraj, Mohamad Noor Imrah A Hadi	3:11.37	
	United Arab Emirates		DNS	
