= 2011 Asian Athletics Championships – Men's 4 × 400 metres relay =

2011 Asian Athletics Championships mens 4x400

The men's 4 × 400 metres relay at the 2011 Asian Athletics Championships was held at the Kobe Universiade Memorial Stadium on the 8 and 10 of July.

== Medalists ==
Gold	Yusuke Ishitsuka; Kei Takase; Hideyuki Hirose; Yuzo Kanemaru; Japan
Silver	Mohammed Ali Albishi; Hamed Al-Bishi; Y.I. Alhezam; Yousef Ahmed Masrahi; Saudi Arabia
Bronze	Peyman Rajabi; A. Ghelichizokhanou; Ehsan Mohajer Shojaei; Sajjad Hashemiahangari; Iran

== Records ==
2011 Asian Athletics Championships
World record	Andrew Valmon; Quincy Watts; Butch Reynolds; Michael Johnson; United States	2:54.29	Stuttgart, Germany	22 August 1993
Asian record	Shigekazu Omori; Jun Osakada; Koji Ito; Shunji Karube; Japan	3:00.76	Atlanta, United States	3 August 1996
Championship record	Kenji Tabata; Jun Osakada; Shunji Karube; Masayoshi Kan; Japan	3:02.61	Fukuoka, Japan	1998

== Results ==
=== Final ===
Rank	Lane	Name	Nationality	Time	Notes
1st place, gold medalist(s)	4	Yusuke Ishitsuka; Kei Takase; Hideyuki Hirose; Yuzo Kanemaru	Japan	3:04.72	
2nd place, silver medalist(s)	6	Mohammed Ali Albishi; Hamed Al-Bishi; Y.I. Alhezam; Yousef Ahmed Masrahi	Saudi Arabia	3:08.03	
3rd place, bronze medalist(s)	2	Peyman Rajabi; A. Ghelichizokhanou; Ehsan Mohajer Shojaei; Sajjad Hashemiahangari	Iran	3:08.58	
4	7	Prasanna Sampath Amarasekara; R.P. Imiya Mudiyansel; Kasun Kankanamlage; D.N.K. Ruppegoda Gama	Sri Lanka	3:09.26	
5	8	Othman Al-Busaidi; Obaid Al-Quraini; Abdullah Al-Hidi; Ahmed Mohamed Al-Merjabi	Oman	3:09.28	
–	3	Aymen Mohammed; Mohammed Jumaah; Kareem Al-Nashi; Karar Al-Abbody	Iraq	–	DSQ
–	5	Davinder Singh; Jithin Paul; Premanand Jayakumar; Shake Mortaja	India	–	DSQ
