= Hideyuki Hirose =

Japanese sprinter (born 1989)

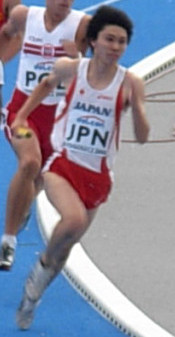
- Hideyuki Hirose in 2008

Personal information
- Nationality: Japanese
- Born: 20 July 1989 (age 36) Saga Prefecture, Japan
- Education: Keio University
- Height: 1.76 m (5 ft 9 in)
- Weight: 62 kg (137 lb)

Sport
- Country: Japan
- Sport: Track and field
- Event: 400 metres
- Personal best: 45.84 (Hiroshima 2009, Kumagaya 2011)
Medal record
Men's athletics
Representing Japan
Asian Games
Silver medal – second place	2010 Guangzhou	4×400 m relay
Asian Championships
Gold medal – first place	2009 Guangzhou	4×400 m relay
Gold medal – first place	2011 Kobe	4×400 m relay
Silver medal – second place	2009 Guangzhou	400 m
Silver medal – second place	2011 Kobe	400 m
Silver medal – second place	2013 Pune	4×400 m relay
Universiade
Silver medal – second place	2011 Shenzhen	4×400 m relay
Bronze medal – third place	2009 Belgrade	4×400 m relay

Hideyuki Hirose (廣瀬 英行, Hirose Hideyuki; born 20 July 1989) is a Japanese sprinter specializing in the 400-meter dash. He competed at the 2009 World Championships without reaching the final. He won several medals at regional championships mostly in the relay.

His personal best in the event is 45.84 seconds, which he achieved in 2009 and in 2011.

== Personal bests ==
Event	Time (s)	Competition	Venue	Date
400 m	45.84	Japanese Championships	Hiroshima, Japan	28 June 2009
400 m	45.84	Japanese Championships	Kumagaya, Japan	12 June 2011

== Competition record ==
Year	Competition	Venue	Position	Event	Notes
Representing Japan
2008	Asian Junior Championships	Jakarta, Indonesia	4th	400 m	47.50
2008	World Junior Championships	Bydgoszcz, Poland	23rd (sf)	400 m	48.30
2008	World Junior Championships	Bydgoszcz, Poland	8th (h)	4x400 m relay	3:09.61
2009	Universiade	Belgrade, Serbia	8th (sf)	400 m	46.84
2009	Universiade	Belgrade, Serbia	3rd	4x400 m relay	3:06.46
2009	World Championships	Berlin, Germany	37th (h)	400 m	46.80
2009	Asian Championships	Guangzhou, China	2nd	400 m	46.03
2009	Asian Championships	Guangzhou, China	1st	4x400 m relay	3:04.72
2010	Asian Games	Guangzhou, China	2nd	4x400 m relay	3:02.43
2011	Asian Championships	Kobe, Japan	2nd	400 m	46.03
2011	Asian Championships	Kobe, Japan	1st	4x400 m relay	3:04.72
2011	Universiade	Shenzhen, China	17th (sf)	400 m	47.07
2011	Universiade	Shenzhen, China	2nd	4x400 m relay	3:05.16
2011	World Championships	Daegu, South Korea	13th (h)	4x400 m relay	3:02.64
2013	Asian Championships	Pune, India	2nd	4x400 m relay	3:04.46
2013	World Championships	Moscow, Russia	10th (h)	4x400 m relay	3:02.43
