= 2007 Asian Athletics Championships – Men's 200 metres =

The men's 200 metres event at the 2007 Asian Athletics Championships was held in Amman, Jordan on July 27–28.

== Medalists ==
Gold	Silver	Bronze
Kenji Fujimitsu; Japan	Al-Waleed Abdulla; Qatar	Khalil Al-Hanahneh; Jordan

== Results ==
=== Heats ===
Wind: Heat 1: +2.2 m/s, Heat 2: +1.8 m/s, Heat 3: +1.2 m/s

Rank	Heat	Name	Nationality	Time	Notes
1	1	Kenji Fujimitsu	Japan	20.87	Q
2	1	Khalil Al-Hanahneh	Jordan	20.90	Q
3	2	Al-Waleed Abdulla	Qatar	21.08	Q
4	2	Tang Yik Chun	Hong Kong	21.15	Q
5	2	Lee Jun-woo	South Korea	21.33	q
6	1	Liang Tse-Ching	Chinese Taipei	21.40	q
7	2	Mussa Hosawi	Saudi Arabia	21.43	
8	3	Ahmad Sumarsono Sakeh	Indonesia	21.47	Q
9	3	Leung Ki Ho	Hong Kong	21.62	Q
10	3	Areef Ibrahim	Qatar	21.62	
11	3	Shafiq Kashmiri	Singapore	21.63	
12	1	Muhamad Zaiful Zainal Abidin	Malaysia	21.70	
13	2	Narendran Shanmuganathan	Malaysia	21.7?	
14	1	Yasir Al-Nashri	Saudi Arabia	21.81	
15	1	Tamim Mohammad Siraj	Lebanon	21.84	
16	2	Rashid Arnous	Jordan	22.11	
17	2	Thomas Semaan	Lebanon	22.15	
18	1	Saad Al-Yahya	Kuwait	22.59	
19	3	Mohammed Munassar	Yemen	23.29	
20	2	Mohammad Shamsuddin	Bangladesh	23.76	
	3	Lim Hee-nam	South Korea	DNF	
	1	Salim Al-Gaifi	Yemen	DNS	
	3	Arnold Villarube	Philippines	DNS	
	3	Zahir Naseer	Maldives	DNS	

=== Final ===
Wind: +0.8 m/s

Rank	Lane	Name	Nationality	Time	Notes
1st place, gold medalist(s)	5	Kenji Fujimitsu	Japan	20.85	
2nd place, silver medalist(s)	3	Al-Waleed Abdulla	Qatar	20.98	
3rd place, bronze medalist(s)	6	Khalil Al-Hanahneh	Jordan	21.03	
4	2	Tang Yik Chun	Hong Kong	21.44	
5	8	Leung Ki Ho	Hong Kong	21.46	
6	1	Lee Jun-woo	South Korea	21.57	
7	4	Ahmad Sumarsono Sakeh	Indonesia	21.58	
8	7	Liang Tse-Ching	Chinese Taipei	21.62	
