= Athletics at the 2009 Summer Universiade – Men's 4 × 400 metres relay =

The men's 4 x 400 metres relay event at the 2009 Summer Universiade was held on 11–12 July.

== Medalists ==
Gold	Silver	Bronze
Australia; Chris Troode; Brendan Cole; Tristan Thomas; Sean Wroe; Clay Watkins*; John Burstow*	Poland; Witold Bańka; Kacper Kozłowski; Piotr Kędzia; Rafał Wieruszewski; Piotr Wiaderek*	Japan; Hideyuki Hirose; Yusuke Ishitsuka; Kazuaki Yoshida; Yuzo Kanemaru

* Athletes who competed in heats only and received medals.

== Results ==
=== Heats ===
Qualification: First 3 teams of each heat (Q) plus the next 2 fastest (q) qualified for the final.

Rank	Heat	Nation	Athletes	Time	Notes
1	2	Poland	Piotr Wiaderek, Witold Bańka, Piotr Kędzia, Rafał Wieruszewski	3:07.12	Q
2	2	Belgium	Nils Duerinck, Arnaud Destatte, Arnaud Froidmont, Antoine Gillet	3:07.31	Q
3	2	Australia	Clay Watkins, Brendan Cole, John Burstow, Tristan Thomas	3:07.69	Q
4	1	Japan	Hideyuki Hirose, Yusuke Ishitsuka, Kazuaki Yoshida, Yuzo Kanemaru	3:08.38	Q
5	2	South Africa	Sibusiso Teboho Sishi, Pieter Smith, Cornel Fredericks, Warren Hendricks	3:08.51	q
6	1	Denmark	Jacob Fabricius Riis, Daniel Christensen, Thomas Cortebeeck, Nicklas Kirk Hyde	3:09.49	Q
7	1	Algeria	Fayçal Cherifi, Houari Mazouni, Samir Khadar, Miloud Rahmani	3:09.67	Q
8	1	Russia	Denis Byvakin, Aleksander Sigalovskiy, Vyacheslav Sokolov, Artem Sergeyenkov	3:10.42	q
9	2	Uganda	Emmanuel Tugumisirize, Lukungu Waiswa, Ramadhan Akulla, Alli Ngaimoko	3:11.90	
10	2	Ghana	Bernard Adams, Robert Annak, Kester Owusu Boateng, Enock Sekum	3:22.26	
11	1	Botswana	Edward Jele Ofentse, Katlego Maotwe, Xomar Karupu, Mmoloki Fredrick Seele	3:26.62	
	1	Hong Kong		DNS	
	1	Serbia		DNS	
	2	Nigeria		DNS	

=== Final ===
Rank	Nation	Athletes	Time	Notes
1st place, gold medalist(s)	Australia	Chris Troode, Brendan Cole, Tristan Thomas, Sean Wroe	3:03.67	
2nd place, silver medalist(s)	Poland	Witold Bańka, Kacper Kozłowski, Piotr Kędzia, Rafał Wieruszewski	3:05.69	
3rd place, bronze medalist(s)	Japan	Hideyuki Hirose, Yusuke Ishitsuka, Kazuaki Yoshida, Yuzo Kanemaru	3:06.46	
4	Belgium	Nils Duerinck, Arnaud Destatte, Arnaud Ghislain, Antoine Gillet	3:06.61	
5	Russia	Vladimir Guziy, Vyacheslav Sokolov, Aleksander Sigalovskiy, Artem Sergeyenkov	3:09.19	
6	South Africa	Sibusiso Teboho Sishi, Pieter Smith, Warren Hendricks, Cornel Fredericks	3:09.82	
7	Denmark	Jacob Fabricius Riis, Nicklas Kirk Hyde, Thomas Cortebeeck, Reedtz Matias Bredahl	3:11.30	
8	Algeria	Fayçal Cherifi, Walid Meliani, Houari Mazouni, Miloud Rahmani	3:12.94	
