= Athletics at the 2009 East Asian Games =

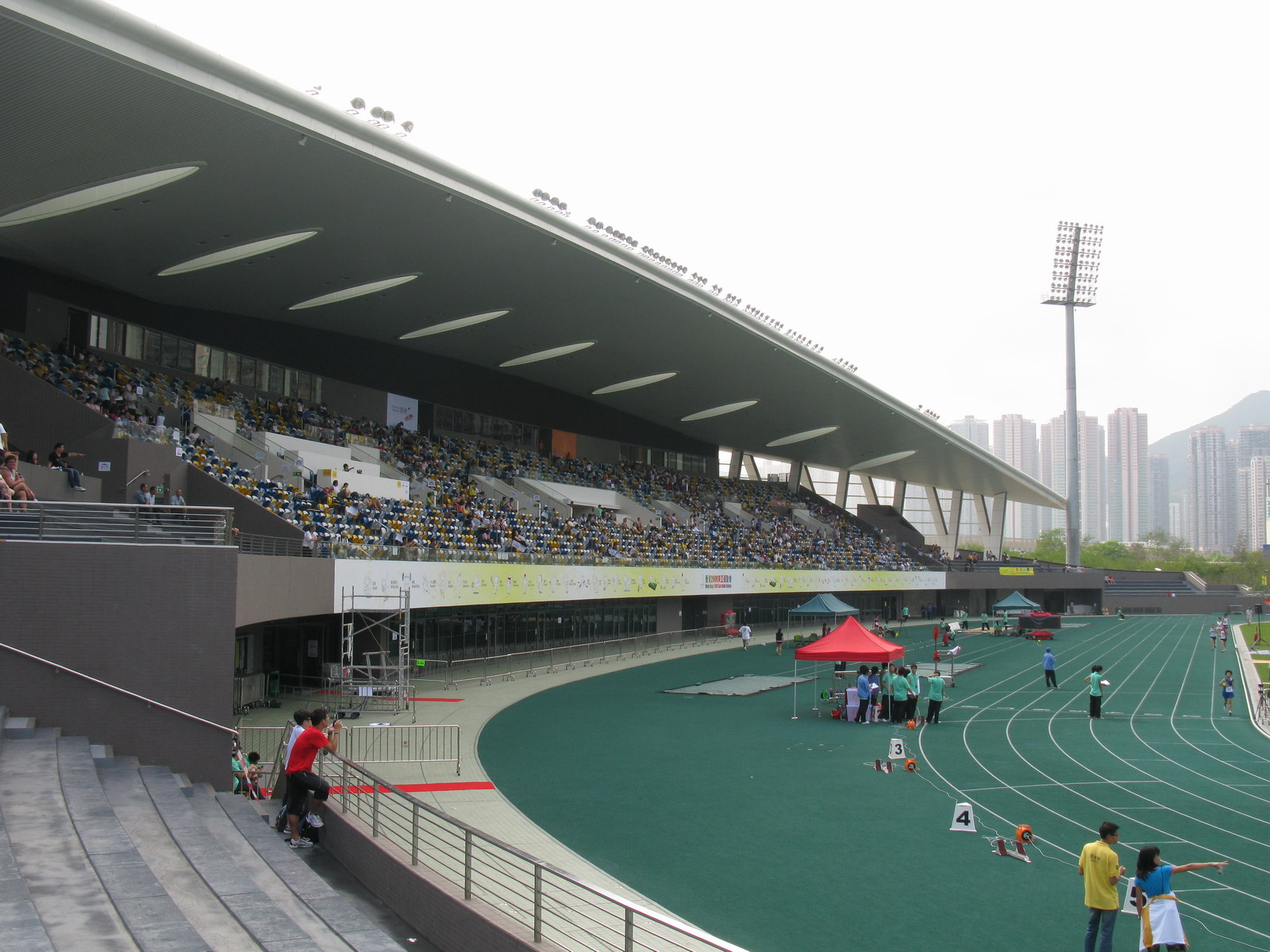
- The main stadium in Hong Kong
- Dates: 10 – 13 December
- Host city: Hong Kong
- Venue: Tseung Kwan O Sports Ground
- Level: Senior
- Events: 46
- Participation: ? athletes from 9 nations
- Records set: 3 Games records

At the 2009 East Asian Games, the athletics events were held at the Tseung Kwan O Sports Ground in Hong Kong from 10 December to 13 December. A total of 46 events were contested, of which 23 were by male athletes and 23 by female athletes.

China went on to win the most events, with Liu Qing winning golds in the 800 metres, 1500 metres and 4×400 metres relay races. Japan was a clear second place in the medals while South Korea and Chinese Taipei also took a double-digit medal haul. Athletes representing the hosts Hong Kong won seven bronze medals.

== Records ==
Name	Event	Country	Record	Type
Yasunori Murakami	1500 metres	Japan	3:46.24	GR
Zhang Jun	Shot put	China	20.41	GR
Li Yanfeng	Discus throw	China	64.66	GR
Li Zhenzhu	3000 m steeplechase	China	10:00.17	GR

Key:	WR — World record • AR — Area record • GR — Games record • NR — National record

== Medal summary ==
=== Men ===
Event	Gold		Silver		Bronze	
100 metres	Su Bingtian (CHN)	10.33	Shintaro Kimura (JPN)	10.39	Yi Wei-chen (TPE)	10.45
200 metres	Kenji Fujimitsu (JPN)	20.91	Yeo Ho-sua (KOR)	21.27	Sota Kawatsura (JPN)	21.43
400 metres	Liu Xiaosheng (CHN)	46.72	Park Bong-go (KOR)	46.96	Yusuke Ishitsuka (JPN)	47.12
800 metres	Ryosuke Awazu (JPN)	1:50.66	Park Jung-jin (KOR)	1:50.83	Gao Congcong (CHN)	1:50.92
1500 metres	Yasunori Murakami (JPN)	3:46.24 GR	Zhang Haikun (CHN)	3:50.33	Yuichiro Ueno (JPN)	3:55.11
5000 metres	Li Zicheng (CHN)	13:53.48	Yuki Matsuoka (JPN)	13:58.00	Yuichiro Ueno (JPN)	14:18.90
10,000 metres	Kensuke Takezawa (JPN)	30:18.91	Li Zicheng (CHN)	30:19.99	Ho Chin-Ping (TPE)	30:52.70
110 metres hurdles	Liu Xiang (CHN)	13.66	Ji Wei (CHN)	13.88	Park Tae-kyong (KOR)	14.02
400 metres hurdles	Naohiro Kawakita (JPN)	50.61	Meng Yan (CHN)	50.99	Yuta Imazeki (JPN)	51.20
3000 metres steeplechase	Sun Wenli (CHN)	9:01.88	Takayuki Matsuura (JPN)	9:03.89	Wu Wen-Chien (TPE)	9:04.48
4×100 metres relay	Chinese Taipei (TPE); Tu Chia-lin; Liu Yuan-kai; Tsai Meng-lin; Yi Wei-chen	39.31	Japan (JPN); Takumi Kuki; Shintaro Kimura; Kenji Fujimitsu; Shogo Arao	39.40	China (CHN); Yu Liangliang; Li Mingxuan; Su Bingtian; Hu Kai	39.86
4×400 metres relay	Japan (JPN); Yuta Imazeki; Yusuke Ishitsuka; Naohiro Kawakita; Yoshihiro Horigome	3:07.08	China (CHN); Li Mingxuan; Cui Haojing; Meng Yan; Liu Xiaosheng	3:08.63	Chinese Taipei (TPE); Tsai Meng-lin; Liu Yuan-kai; Chang Chi-sheng; Chen Chieh	3:10.47
Half marathon	Tomoya Onishi (JPN)	1:06:05	Pak Song Chol (PRK)	1:06:05	Chang Chia-Che (TPE)	1:06:30
20 km walk	Yu Wei (CHN)	1:26:46	Koichiro Morioka (JPN)	1:26:47	Kim Hyun-sub (KOR)	1:26:59
High jump	Hikaru Tsuchiya (JPN)	2.18	Zhao Kuansong (CHN)	2.18	Wang Chen (CHN)	2.18
Pole vault	Hiroki Ogita (JPN)	5.30	Hiroki Sasase (JPN)	5.30	Hsieh Chia-Han (JPN)	4.80
Long jump	Li Jinzhe (CHN)	7.85	Naohiro Shinada (JPN)	7.73	Rikiya Saruyama (JPN)	7.71
Triple jump	Yohei Kajikawa (JPN)	16.15	Yu Jae-hyeok (KOR)	15.61	Si Kuan Wong (MAC)	15.29
Shot put	Zhang Jun (CHN)	20.41 GR	Chang Ming-Huang (TPE)	18.33	Yohei Murakawa (JPN)	17.58
Discus throw	Shiro Kobayashi (JPN)	55.98	Wang Yao-Hui (TPE)	55.18	Chang Ming-Huang (TPE)	54.92
Hammer throw	Hiroaki Doi (JPN)	71.25	Ma Liang (CHN)	70.74	Hiroshi Noguchi (JPN)	67.40
Javelin throw	Qin Qiang (CHN)	80.41	Zhao Qinggang (CHN)	79.62	Chen Yu-wen (TPE)	72.41
Decathlon	Qi Haifeng (CHN)	7747	Daisuke Ikeda (JPN)	7596	Ng Chit Wing (HKG)	5976

=== Women ===
Event	Gold		Silver		Bronze	
100 metres	Tao Yujia (CHN)	11.70	Mayumi Watanabe (JPN)	11.83	Maki Wada (JPN)	12.06
200 metres	Jiang Lan (CHN)	23.92	Hang Ling (CHN)	24.24	Yuka Nagakura (JPN)	24.88
400 metres	Chen Jingwen (CHN)	53.52	Tang Xiaoyin (CHN)	53.84	Miho Shingu (JPN)	55.37
800 metres	Liu Qing (CHN)	2:06.41	Akari Kishikawa (JPN)	2:07.21	Manami Mashita (JPN)	2:07.42
1500 metres	Liu Qing (CHN)	4:21.64	Shinetsetseg Chuluunkhuu (MGL)	4:39.47	Yiu Kit Ching (HKG)	4:40.71
5000 metres	Yuriko Kobayashi (JPN)	16:46.86	Jia Chaofeng (CHN)	16:47.04	Leong Yuen Fan (HKG)	19:38.83
10,000 metres	Kayo Sugihara (JPN)	33:55.43	Jia Chaofeng (CHN)	34:50.22	Battsetseg Baatarkhuu (MGL)	37:04.86
100 metres hurdles	Sun Yawei (CHN)	13.13	Mami Ishino (JPN)	13.42	Li Wang (CHN)	13.57
400 metres hurdles	Miyabi Tago (JPN)	59.23	Kana Tsuru (JPN)	59.70	Chang Ai-Hua (TPE)	1:03.57
3000 metres steeplechase	Li Zhenzhu (CHN)	10:00.17 GR	Minori Hayakari (JPN)	10:07.01	Yiu Kit Ching (HKG)	11:26.03
4×100 metre relay	China (CHN); Tao Yujia; Jiang Lan; Han Ling; Tang Xiaoyin	44.69	Japan (JPN); Nodoka Seko; Mayumi Watanabe; Kaoru Matsuda; Maki Wada	44.89	Hong Kong (HKG); Hui Man Ling; Leung Hau Sze; Wan Kin Yee; Chan Ho Yee	45.71
4×400 metre relay	China (CHN); Han Ling; Tang Xiaoyin; Jiang Lan; Chen Jingwen	3:37.72	Japan (JPN); Miho Shingu; Kana Tsuru; Yuka Nagakura; Mayu Horie	3:42.18	Chinese Taipei (TPE); Chen Shu-chuan; Chang Ai-hua; Liao Ching-hsien; Liu Wen-yi	3:51.08
Half marathon	Kim Kum Ok (PRK)	1:11.55 (NR)	Yuri Kano (JPN)	1:12:03	Yoko Miyauchi (JPN)	1:12:36
20 km walk	Li Yanfei (CHN)	1:35:33	Kumi Otoshi (JPN)	1:35:40	Yang Mingxia (CHN)	1:45:06
High jump	Zheng Xingjuan (CHN)	1.88	Yuki Mimura (JPN)	1.79	Yip Hiu Laam (HKG)	1.60
Pole vault	Lim Eun-ji (KOR)	4.20	Li Ling (CHN)	4.05	Tomomi Abiko (JPN)	3.90
Long jump	Chen Yaling (CHN)	6.30	Saeko Okayama (JPN)	6.28	Lu Minjia (CHN)	6.24
Triple jump	Hye Kyung-jung (KOR)	13.56	Sayuri Takeda (JPN)	12.80	Tse Mang Chi (HKG)	12.30
Shot put	Li Ling (CHN)	17.95	Li Meiju (CHN)	16.74	Lin Chia-Ying (TPE)	15.47
Discus throw	Li Yanfeng (CHN)	64.66 GR	Xu Shaoyang (CHN)	56.04	Li Wen-Hua (TPE)	55.35
Hammer throw	Wang Zheng (CHN)	67.06	Masumi Aya (JPN)	59.56	Lee Jae-young (KOR)	50.69
Javelin throw	Liu Chunhua (CHN)	60.05	Zhang Li (CHN)	58.12	Emika Yoshida (JPN)	54.27
Heptathlon	Yuki Nakata (JPN)	5717	Lee Eun-im (KOR)	4608	Only two competitors	–

== Medal table ==
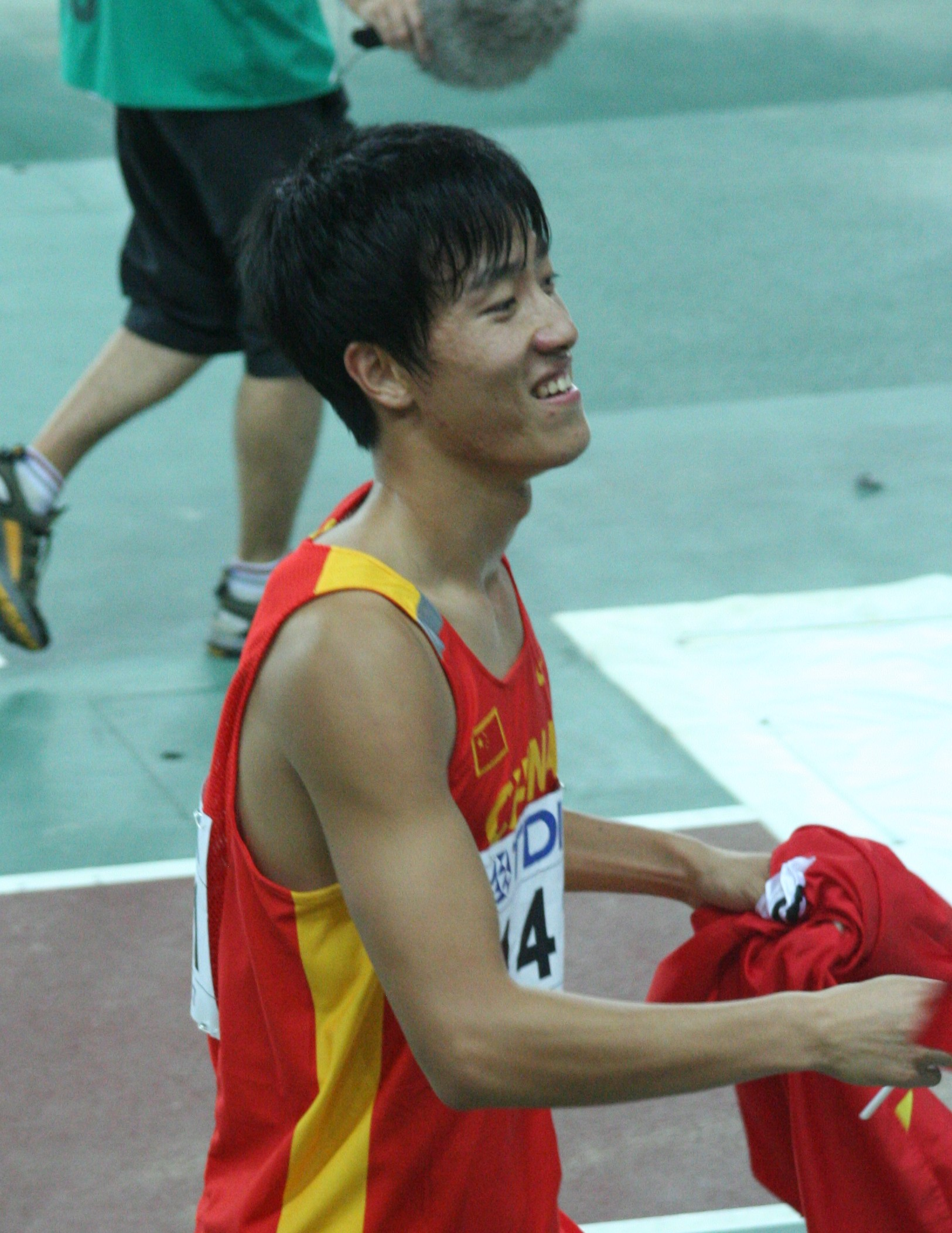
Liu Xiang returned from injury to win the sprint hurdles gold for China

* Host nation (Hong Kong)

Rank	Nation	Gold	Silver	Bronze	Total
1	China	26	16	6	48
2	Japan	16	21	15	52
3	South Korea	2	5	3	10
4	Chinese Taipei	1	2	12	15
5	North Korea	1	1	0	2
6	Mongolia	0	1	1	2
7	Hong Kong*	0	0	7	7
8	Macau	0	0	1	1
9	Guam	0	0	0	0
Totals (9 entries)		46	46	45	137
