= 2013 Asian Athletics Championships – Men's 4 × 400 metres relay =

The men's 4 × 400 metres relay at the 2013 Asian Athletics Championships was held at the Shiv Chhatrapati Stadium in Pune, India on 7 July.

Rank	Nation	Competitors	Time	Notes
1st place, gold medalist(s)	Saudi Arabia	Ismail Al-Sabiani, Fahhad Al-Subaie, Mohammed Al-Bishi, Yousef Masrahi	3:02.53	CR
2nd place, silver medalist(s)	Japan	Yusuke Ishitsuka, Kazuya Watanabe, Yuzo Kanemaru, Hideyuki Hirose	3:04.46	
3rd place, bronze medalist(s)	Sri Lanka	Chanaka Dulan Priyashantha, Kasun Seneviratne, Dilhan Aloka, Anjana Madushan Gunarathna	3:04.46	
4	India	Davinder Singh, Kunhu Muhammed Puthanpurakkal, Sachin Roby, Arokia Rajiv	3:06.01	
5	Philippines	Bano Junrey, Julius Felicisimo Jr., Alejan Edgardo Jr., Archand Christian Bagsit	3:10.86	
6	Thailand	Arnon Jaiaree, Thanakorn Namee, Treenate Krittanukulwong, Saharat Summayan	3:14.08	
7	Hong Kong	Leung King Hung, Choi Ho Sing, Chan Ka Chun, Chan Yan Lam	3:14.34	
	Maldives		DNS	
