= Yusuke Ishitsuka =

Japanese sprinter (born 1987)

Personal information
- Born: 19 June 1987 (age 38) Ibaraki Prefecture, Japan
- Height: 1.79 m (5 ft 10 1/2 in)
- Weight: 73 kg (161 lb)

Sport
- Sport: Track and field
- Event: 400 metres

Yusuke Ishitsuka (石塚 祐輔, Ishitsuka Yūsuke; born 19 June 1987 in Ibaraki Prefecture) is a Japanese sprinter who specialised in the 400 metres. He represented his country at the 2007 World Championships and 2011 World Championships.

His personal best in the event is 45.87 seconds set in Fukuroi in 2013.

== Competition record ==
Year	Competition	Venue	Position	Event	Notes
Representing Japan
2006	World Junior Championships	Guangzhou, China	12th (sf)	200 m	21.41
2006	World Junior Championships	Guangzhou, China	12th (h)	4 × 100 m relay	40.17
2006	World Junior Championships	Guangzhou, China	8th	4 × 400 m relay	3:16.61
2007	World Championships	Osaka, Japan	10th (h)	4 × 400 m relay	3:02.76
2009	Universiade	Belgrade, Serbia	3rd	4 × 400 m relay	3:06.46
2009	East Asian Games	Hong Kong, China	3rd	400 m	47.12
2009	East Asian Games	Hong Kong, China	1st	4 × 400 m relay	3:07.08
2010	Asian Games	Guangzhou, China	8th	400 m	47.49
2010	Asian Games	Guangzhou, China	2nd	4 × 400 m relay	3:02.43
2011	Asian Championships	Kobe, Japan	5th	400 m	46.53
2011	Asian Championships	Kobe, Japan	1st	4 × 400 m relay	3:04.72
2011	World Championships	Daegu, South Korea	13th (h)	4 × 400 m electrical relay	3:02.64
2013	Asian Championships	Pune, India	2nd	4 × 400 m relay	3:04.46
2014	Asian Indoor Championships	Hangzhou, China	11th (h)	400 m	49.18
2014	IAAF World Relays	Nassau, Bahamas	10th	4 × 400 m relay	3:03.24
