= Zhang Jun (shot putter) =

Chinese shot putter (born 1983)

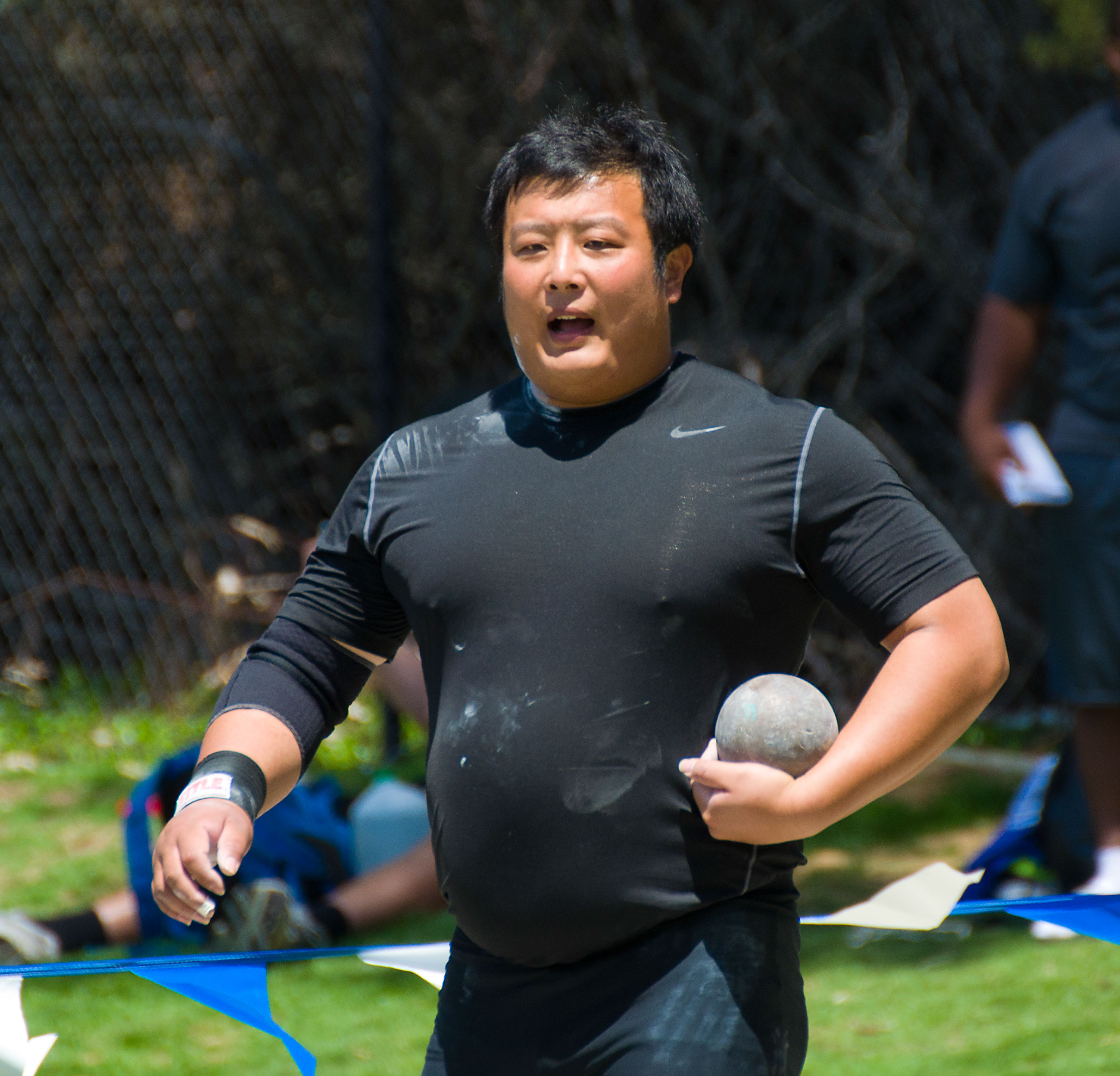
- Zhang Jun in 2012.

Personal information
- Born: April 11, 1983 (age 43)
- Height: 1.86 m (6 ft 1 in)
- Weight: 120 kg (265 lb)

Sport
- Country: China
- Sport: Athletics
- Event: Shot put
Medal record
Men's athletics
Representing China
Asian Games
Silver medal – second place	2010 Guangzhou	Shot put
Asian Athletics Championships
Bronze medal – third place	2011 Kobe	Shot put
Asian Indoor Championships
Gold medal – first place	2012 Hangzhou	Shot put
East Asian Games
Gold medal – first place	2009 Hong Kong	Shot put
Summer Universiade
Silver medal – second place	2009 Belgrade	Shot put
- Updated on 15 August 2012

Zhang Jun (Chinese: 张竣 ; born 11 April 1983) is a male Chinese track and field athlete who competes in the shot put. He is the Chinese record holder outdoors with a throw of 20.41 metres and the Asian record holder indoors with a mark of 20.16 m. He has won medals at the Summer Universiade, Asian Games, Asian Athletics Championships and the East Asian Games. He represented China at the 2010 IAAF World Indoor Championships and the 2012 Summer Olympics.

Hailing from Shanghai, he began competing on the senior athletics circuit in 2001 and threw over the eighteen-metre mark for the first time in 2005. He set an indoor personal best of 18.16 m to win at the Shanghai leg of the Chinese Grand Prix series and then improved to 18.36 m outdoors at the Chinese Athletics Championships, where he eventually finished ninth overall. He had a best throw of 18.12 m at the 10th National Games of China and finished seventh. In 2007 he threw the shot 18.73 m to take second place at the National Grand Prix final. The 2008 season saw he near the top of the field nationally, as he threw an indoor best of 18.50 m to win at the Shanghai Grand Prix. He placed fifth at both the Chinese Olympic trials and the National Championships, but won at the Chinese Grand Prix final with a season's best throw of 18.64 m.

Zhang made significant progressions in 2009. He had string of victories leading up to a personal best of 19.44 m to win the Chinese title. He gained international selection for the first time and improved his best further to 19.58 m to claim the silver medal behind Soslan Tsyrikhov at the 2009 Summer Universiade. His performance was down at the 11th National Games of China (17.78 m for tenth place), but he rebounded at the 2009 Asian Athletics Championships by taking the bronze medal for China. His last major competition that year was the 2009 East Asian Games in Hong Kong and he broke the Chinese national record with his winning throw of 20.41 m (which was also a games record).

His 2010 season began with a Chinese indoor record throw of 19.90 m in March, improving upon Ma Yongfeng's long-standing record from 1989. Zhang participated on the world stage for the first time later that month at the 2010 IAAF World Indoor Championships in Doha and he finished tenth in the qualifying round. He performed well on the regional circuit, winning a number of Chinese and Asian Athletics Grand Prix meetings and clearing 19 metres on numerous occasions. His best throw outdoors that year was a put of 19.85 m to win the Chinese circuit final, which he followed with a win at the national championships. He placed third for China at the DécaNation competition and closed the year with a silver medal at the 2010 Asian Games.

Zhang went undefeated on the Chinese Athletics Grand Prix circuit in 2011 and was the runner-up at the 2011 Asian Athletics Championships behind the Taiwanese thrower Chang Ming-Huang. Despite his strong form in China, he failed to give a valid throw at the National Championships that year. At the start of 2012 he became the first Chinese athlete to throw beyond twenty metres at an indoor meeting. His throw of 20.16 m in Nanjing represented a continental best, as it bettered the six-year-old Asian record mark set by Khaled Habash Al-Suwaidi.
