= Kenji Fujimitsu =

Japanese sprinter (born 1986)

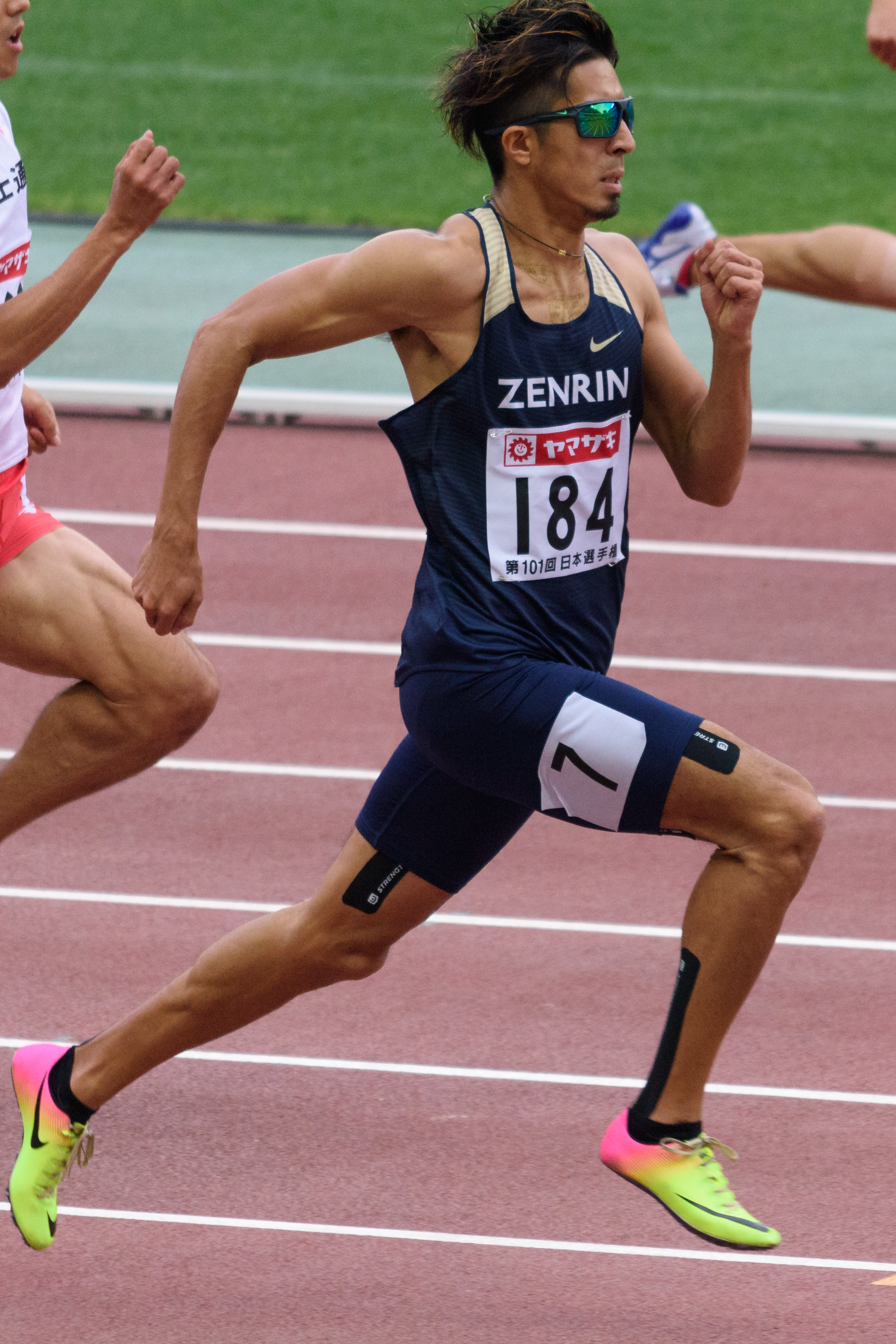

Personal information
- Nationality: Japan
- Born: 1 May 1986 (age 40) Saitama, Japan
- Education: Nihon University
- Height: 1.82 m (6 ft 0 in)
- Weight: 71 kg (157 lb)

Sport
- Sport: Track and field
- Event: 200 m
- Personal bests: 100 m: 10.23 (Tottori 2017) 200 m: 20.13 (Lucerne 2015) 300 m: 32.21 AB (Izumo 2015)
Medal record
Men's athletics
Representing Japan
World Championships
Bronze medal – third place	2017 London	4×100 m relay
World Relays
Bronze medal – third place	2015 Nassau	4×100 m relay
Asian Games
Gold medal – first place	2014 Incheon	4×400 m relay
Silver medal – second place	2010 Guangzhou	200 m
Silver medal – second place	2010 Guangzhou	4×400 m relay
Asian Championships
Gold medal – first place	2007 Amman	200 m
Gold medal – first place	2009 Guangzhou	4×100 m relay
Gold medal – first place	2009 Guangzhou	4×400 m relay
East Asian Games
Gold medal – first place	2009 Hong Kong	200 m
Silver medal – second place	2009 Hong Kong	4×100 m relay
World Youth Championships
Bronze medal – third place	2003 Sherbrooke	Medley relay
Representing Asia-Pacific
Continental Cup
Silver medal – second place	2010 Split	4×100 m relay

Kenji Fujimitsu (藤光 謙司, Fujimitsu Kenji; born 1 May 1986) is a Japanese sprinter who specialises in the 200 metres. He is a one-time Asian champion and two-time national champion in the event and has a personal best of 20.13 seconds. He is also a bronze medalist in the 4 × 100 metres relay at the 2017 World Championships. He holds the Asian best in the rarely-contested 300 metres.

== Personal bests ==
Event	Time (s)	Competition	Venue	Date	Notes
100 m	10.23 (+1.9 m/s)	Fuse Sprint	Tottori, Japan	4 June 2017	
100 m	10.14 (+3.2 m/s)	KBC Night of Athletics	Heusden-Zolder, Belgium	18 July 2015	Wind-assisted
200 m	20.13 (+0.6 m/s)	Spitzen Leichtathletik Luzern	Lucerne, Switzerland	14 July 2015	
300 m	32.21	Izumo Meet	Izumo, Japan	12 April 2015	Current AB

== Achievements ==
Year	Competition	Venue	Position	Event	Notes
Representing Japan and Asia-Pacific (Continental Cup only)
2003	World Youth Championships	Sherbrooke, Canada	10th (sf)	200 m	21.64
2003	World Youth Championships	Sherbrooke, Canada	3rd	Medley relay	1:53.11
2007	Asian Championships	Amman, Jordan	1st	200 m	20.85
2009	World Championships	Berlin, Germany	20th (qf)	200 m	20.97
2009	World Championships	Berlin, Germany	4th	4 × 100 m relay	38.30
2009	Asian Championships	Guangzhou, China	1st	4 × 100 m relay	39.01
2009	Asian Championships	Guangzhou, China	1st	4 × 400 m relay	3:04.13
2009	East Asian Games	Hong Kong, China	1st	200 m	20.91
2009	East Asian Games	Hong Kong, China	2nd	4 × 100 m relay	39.40
2010	Continental Cup	Split, Croatia	5th	200 m	20.80
2010	Continental Cup	Split, Croatia	2nd	4 × 100 m relay	39.28
2010	Asian Games	Guangzhou, China	2nd	200 m	20.74
2010	Asian Games	Guangzhou, China	10th (h)	4 × 100 m relay	47.14
2010	Asian Games	Guangzhou, China	2nd	4 × 400 m relay	3:02.43
2013	World Championships	Moscow, Russia	6th	4 × 100 m relay	38.39
2014	World Relays	Nassau, Bahamas	9th (h)	4 × 200 m relay	1:23.87
2014	Asian Games	Incheon, South Korea	1st	4 × 400 m relay	3:01.88
2015	World Relays	Nassau, Bahamas	3rd	4 × 100 m relay	38.20
2015	World Championships	Beijing, China	15th (sf)	200 m	20.34
2015	World Championships	Beijing, China	10th (h)	4 × 100 m relay	38.60
2016	Olympic Games	Rio de Janeiro, Brazil	64th (h)	200 m	20.86
2017	World Championships	London, United Kingdom	3rd	4 × 100 m relay	38.04
2019	World Relays	Yokohama, Japan	5th	4 × 200 m relay	1:22.67

== National titles ==
- Japanese Championships
  - 200 m: 2010, 2015

== Away from running ==
He joined SASUKE 31 at 28 July 2021. He has given number 95. He failed Stage 1 at Rolling Hill.

== See also ==
- List of World Athletics Championships medalists (men)
- List of Asian Games medalists in athletics
- List of 200 metres national champions (men)
