= Khalil Al-Hanahneh =

Jordanian sprinter

Personal information
- Nationality: Jordan
- Born: 1980 (age 45–46)

Sport
- Sport: Athletics

Achievements and titles
- Olympic finals: 2004 & 2008
Medal record
Men's athletics
Representing Jordan
Asian Championships
Bronze medal – third place	2007 Amman	200 m

Khalil Hamad Al-Hanahneh (born May 11, 1980) is a Jordanian athlete who specializes in the 100 metres. Al-Hanahneh participated in 2004 Summer Olympics and 2008 Summer Olympics. Al-Hanahneh has also represented his country at the 2003 World Championship (100 metres), 2007 World Championship (200 metres) and 2009 World Championship (200 metres). He won medals in the sprints at the 2007 Pan Arab Games and 2005 West Asian Games and was the bronze medallist over 200 metres at the 2007 Asian Athletics Championships.

Participating in the 2004 Summer Olympics, he achieved sixth place in his 100 metres heat, thus failing to make it through to the second round. Al Hanahneh has set several national records, and ranked third in the 2007 Pan Arab Games in 100 m and second in 200 metres where he qualified for the 2008 Olympics.

== See also ==
- Athletics at the 2006 Asian Games – Results
- List of Jordanian records in athletics
