= 2011 Asian Athletics Championships =

2011 Asian Championships
- Dates: July 7–10
- Host city: Kobe, Japan
- Venue: Kobe Universiade Memorial Stadium
- Events: 42
- Participation: 464 athletes from 40 nations

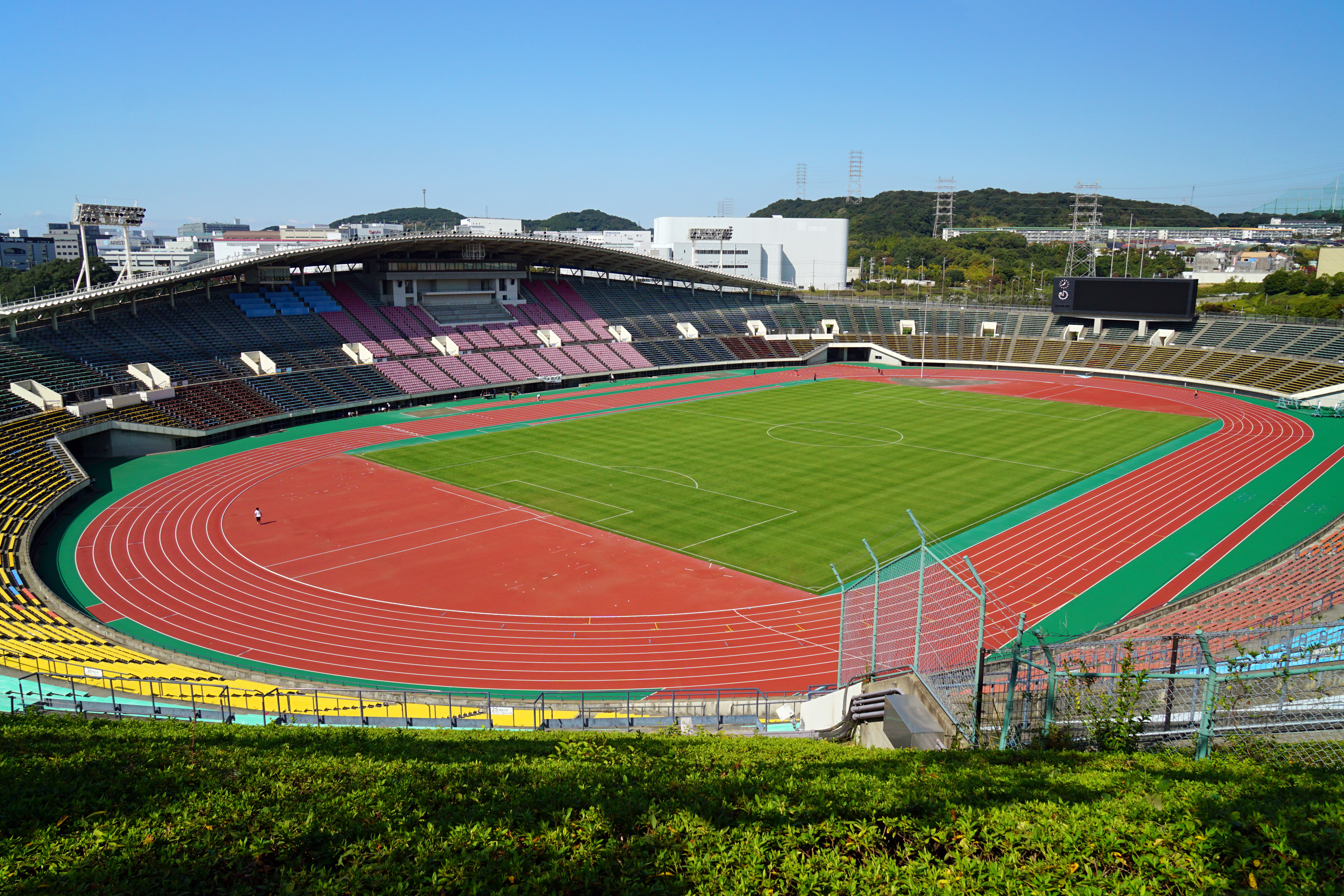
Kobe Universiade Memorial Stadium

The 19th Asian Athletics Championships were held in Kobe, Japan between July 7–10, 2011 at the Kobe Universiade Memorial Stadium. The tournament had 507 athletes from forty Asian nations competing in the 42 track and field events over the four-day competition.

Two countries dominated the events: the host nation Japan won the most medals at the competition (32 overall, 11 golds), closely followed by China's eleven golds and 27 overall medal haul. The next most successful countries were Bahrain (which won five golds on the track through its former Ethiopian and Kenyan runners) and India, which won twelve medals.

A total of eight Championship records were equalled or beaten at the competition. Liu Xiang won his fourth consecutive 110 metres hurdles title with a championship record mark. Kuwait's Mohammad Al-Azemi completed an 800/1500 metres double with Iranian Sajjad Moradi finishing as runner-up both times. India's Mayookha Johny won the long jump, his the triple jump won him a bronze and also broke his country's national record in triple jump. Twenty-year-old Mutaz Essa Barshim cleared 2.35 metres in the high jump. On the women's side, Truong Thanh Hang of Vietnam won the 800 m and was the 1500 m silver medallist.

Gretta Taslakian of Lebanon and Iraqi Gulustan Ieso won their countries' first medals in the women's section, while the traditionally male-only United Arab Emirates sent their first female athlete to the competition (Betlhem Desalegn). Ieso and Olga Tereshkova both failed doping tests at the competition, thus losing their individual medals and also their team relay medals.

== Medal summary ==
=== Men ===
| Event | Gold | | Silver | | Bronze | |
|---|---|---|---|---|---|---|
| 100 metres | Su Bingtian; China | 10.21 | Masashi Eriguchi; Japan | 10.28 | Sota Kawatsura; Japan | 10.30 |
| 200 metres | Femi Seun Ogunode; Qatar | 20.41 =CR | Hitoshi Saito; Japan | 20.75 | Omar Jouma Al-Salfa; United Arab Emirates | 20.97 |
| 400 metres | Yousef Ahmed Masrahi; Saudi Arabia | 45.79 | Hideyuki Hirose; Japan | 46.03 | Yūzō Kanemaru; Japan | 46.38 |
| 800 metres | Mohammad Al-Azemi; Kuwait | 1:46.14 | Sajjad Moradi; Iran | 1:46.35 | Ghamnda Ram; India | 1:46.46 |
| 1500 metres | Mohammad Al-Azemi; Kuwait | 3:42.49 | Sajjad Moradi; Iran | 3:43.30 | Chaminda Wijekoon; Sri Lanka | 3:44.01 |
| 5000 metres | Dejenee Mootumaa; Bahrain | 13:39.71 CR | Yuki Sato; Japan | 13:40.78 | Alemu Bekele Gebre; Bahrain | 13:41.93 |
| 10,000 metres | Ali Hasan Mahboob; Bahrain | 28:35.49 | Bilisuma Shugi Gelasa; Bahrain | 28:36.30 | Akinobu Murasawa; Japan | 28:40.63 |
| 110 m hurdles | Liu Xiang; China | 13.22 CR | Shi Dongpeng; China | 13.56 | Park Tae-kyong; South Korea | 13.66 |
| 400 m hurdles | Takatoshi Abe; Japan | 49.64 | Yuta Imazeki; Japan | 50.22 | Chen Chieh; Chinese Taipei | 50.39 |
| 3000 m steeplechase | Abubaker Ali Kamal; Qatar | 8:30.23 | Artem Kosinov; Kazakhstan | 8:35.11 | Tareq Mubarak Taher; Bahrain | 8:45.47 |
| 4 × 100 m relay | Japan; Sota Kawatsura; Masashi Eriguchi; Shinji Takahira; Hitoshi Saito | 39.18 | Hong Kong; Tang Yik Chun; Lai Chun Ho; Ng Ka Fung; Chi Ho Tsui | 39.26 | Chinese Taipei; Wang Wen-tang; Liu Yuan-kai; Tsai Meng-lin; Yi Wei-che | 39.30 |
| 4 × 400 m relay | Japan; Yusuke Ishitsuka; Kei Takase; Hideyuki Hirose; Yuzo Kanemaru | 3:04.72 | Saudi Arabia; Mohammed Ali Albishi; Hamed Al-Bishi; Y.I. Alhezam; Yousef Ahmed Masrahi | 3:08.03 | Iran; Peyman Rajabi; Amin Ghelichi; Ehsan Mohajer Shojaei; Sajjad Hashemi | 3:08.58 |
| High jump | Mutaz Essa Barshim; Qatar | 2.35 m NR | Majd Eddin Ghazal; Syria | 2.28 m NR | Wang Chen; China | 2.26 m |
| Pole vault | Daichi Sawano; Japan | 5.50 m | Hiroki Ogita; Japan | 5.40 m | Yang Yansheng; China | 5.40 m |
| Long jump | Su Xiongfeng; China | 8.19 m | Supanara Sukhasvasti; Thailand | 8.05 m NJR | Rikiya Saruyama; Japan | 8.05 m |
| Triple jump | Yevgeniy Ektov; Kazakhstan | 16.91 m | Li Yanxi; China | 16.70 m | Roman Valiyev; Kazakhstan | 16.62 m |
| Shot put | Chang Ming-huang; Chinese Taipei | 20.14 m CR | Zhang Jun; China | 19.77 m | Om Prakash Karhana; India | 19.47 m |
| Discus throw | Ehsan Haddadi; Iran | 62.27 m | Vikas Gowda; India | 61.58 m | Wu Jian; China | 56.61 m |
| Hammer throw | Ali Al-Zinkawi; Kuwait | 73.73 m | Hiroshi Noguchi; Japan | 70.89 m | Hiroaki Doi; Japan | 70.69 m |
| Javelin throw | Yukifumi Murakami; Japan | 83.27 m CR | Park Jae-myong; South Korea | 80.19 m | Ivan Zaitcev; Uzbekistan | 79.22 m |
| Decathlon | Hadi Sepehrzad; Iran | 7506 pts | Akihiko Nakamura; Japan | 7478 pts | Bharatinder Singh; India | 7358 pts |

=== Women ===
| Event | Gold | | Silver | | Bronze | |
|---|---|---|---|---|---|---|
| 100 metres | Guzel Khubbieva; Uzbekistan | 11.39 | Wei Yongli; China | 11.70 | Tao Yujia; China | 11.74 |
| 200 metres | Chisato Fukushima; Japan | 23.49 | Gretta Taslakian; Lebanon | 24.01 | Saori Imai; Japan | 24.06 |
| 400 metres | Chen Jingwen; China | 52.89 | Chandrika Subashini; Sri Lanka | 53.35 | Chisato Tanaka; Japan | 54.08 |
| 800 metres | Truong Thanh Hang; Vietnam | 2:01.41 | Margarita Matsko; Kazakhstan | 2:02.46 | Tintu Luka; India | 2:02.55 |
| 1500 metres | Genzeb Shumi Regasa; Bahrain | 4:15.91 | Truong Thanh Hang; Vietnam | 4:18.40 | O. P. Jaisha; India | 4:21.41 |
| 5000 metres | Tejitu Daba Chalchissa; Bahrain | 15:22.48 CR | Hitomi Niiya; Japan | 15:34.19 | Yuriko Kobayashi; Japan | 15:42.59 |
| 10,000 metres | Shitaye Eshete; Bahrain | 32:47.80 | Kareema Saleh Jasim; Bahrain | 32:50.70 | Preeja Sreedharan; India | 33:15.55 |
| 100 m hurdles | Sun Yawei; China | 13.04 | Jung Hye-Lim; South Korea | 13.11 | Natalya Ivoninskaya; Kazakhstan | 13.15 |
| 400 m hurdles | Satomi Kubokura; Japan | 56.52 | Qi Yang; China | 56.69 | Christine Merrill; Sri Lanka | 57.30 |
| 3000 m steeplechase | Minori Hayakari; Japan | 9:52.42 CR | Sudha Singh; India | 10:08.52 | Thi Phuong Nguyen; Vietnam | 10:14.94 |
| 4 × 100 m relay | Japan; Nao Okabe; Momoko Takahashi; Chisato Fukushima; Saori Imai | 44.05 | China; Tao Yujia; Liang Qiuping; Jiang Lan; Wei Yongli | 44.23 | Thailand; Phatsorn Jaksuninkorn; Orranut Klomdee; Laphassaporn Tawoncharoen; Nongnuch Sanrat | 44.62 |
| 4 × 400 m relay | Japan; Sayaka Aoki; Chisato Tanaka; Satomi Kubokura; Miho Shingu | 3:35.00 | India; Mrudula Korada; Jhuma Khatun; Jaisha Orchatteri Puthiya; Tintu Luka | 3:44.17 | Not awarded | |
| High jump | Zheng Xingjuan; China | 1.92 m | Svetlana Radzivil; Uzbekistan | 1.92 m | Marina Aitova; Kazakhstan | 1.89 m |
| Pole vault | Wu Sha; China | 4.35 m | Li Ling; China | 4.30 m | Choi Yun-Hee; South Korea | 4.00 m |
| Long jump | Mayookha Johny; India | 6.56 m | Lu Minjia; China | 6.52 m | Saeko Okayama; Japan | 6.51 m |
| Triple jump | Xie Limei; China | 14.58 m | Valeriya Kanatova; Uzbekistan | 14.14 m | Mayookha Johny; India | 14.11 m NR |
| Shot put | Meng Qianqian; China | 18.31 m PB | Liu Xiangrong; China | 18.30 m | Leila Rajabi; Iran | 16.60 m |
| Discus throw | Sun Taifeng; China | 60.89 m | Ma Xuejun; China | 59.67 m | Harwant Kaur; India | 57.99 m |
| Hammer throw | Masumi Aya; Japan | 67.19 m | Liu Tingting; China | 65.42 m | Yuka Murofushi; Japan | 62.50 m |
| Javelin throw | Liu Chunhua; China | 58.05 m | Wang Ping; China | 55.80 m | Yuka Sato; Japan | 54.16 m |
| Heptathlon | Wassana Winatho; Thailand | 5710 pts | Humie Takehara; Japan | 5491 pts | Chie Kiriyama; Japan | 5442 pts |

- Note: The original gold and silver medallists, Kazakhstan's Olga Tereshkova and Iraq's Gulustan Ieso, were later disqualified after testing positive for testosterone and methylhexaneamine, respectively. Initial bronze medallist Chen Jingwen of China was elevated to the gold medal position, while fourth and fifth placed runners Chandrika Subashini and Chisato Tanaka moved into the minor medal positions. The Kazakhstan and Iraqi 4 × 400 m relay quartets were also disqualified as a result. India were promoted to silver medallists and the bronze was vacated as only four teams participated.

== Medal table ==
Shot putter Chang Ming-Huang claimed Chinese Taipei's only gold.

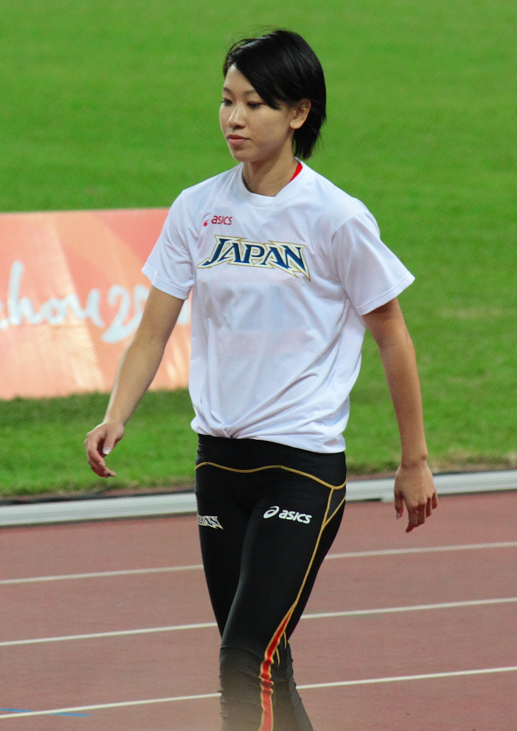
Chisato Fukushima won 200 m and relay golds for the hosts.

* Host nation (Japan)

| Rank | Nation | Gold | Silver | Bronze | Total |
|---|---|---|---|---|---|
| 1 | China (CHN) | 11 | 12 | 4 | 27 |
| 2 | Japan (JPN)* | 11 | 10 | 12 | 33 |
| 3 | Bahrain (BHR) | 5 | 2 | 2 | 9 |
| 4 | Kuwait (KUW) | 3 | 0 | 0 | 3 |
| 4 | Qatar (QAT) | 3 | 0 | 0 | 3 |
| 6 | Iran (IRN) | 2 | 2 | 2 | 6 |
| 7 | India (IND) | 1 | 3 | 8 | 12 |
| 8 | Kazakhstan (KAZ) | 1 | 2 | 3 | 6 |
| 9 | Uzbekistan (UZB) | 1 | 2 | 1 | 4 |
| 10 | Thailand (THA) | 1 | 1 | 1 | 3 |
| 10 | Vietnam (VIE) | 1 | 1 | 1 | 3 |
| 12 | Saudi Arabia (KSA) | 1 | 1 | 0 | 2 |
| 13 | Chinese Taipei (TPE) | 1 | 0 | 2 | 3 |
| 14 | South Korea (KOR) | 0 | 2 | 2 | 4 |
| 15 | Sri Lanka (SRI) | 0 | 1 | 2 | 3 |
| 16 | Hong Kong (HKG) | 0 | 1 | 0 | 1 |
| 16 | Lebanon (LIB) | 0 | 1 | 0 | 1 |
| 16 | Syria (SYR) | 0 | 1 | 0 | 1 |
| 19 | United Arab Emirates (UAE) | 0 | 0 | 1 | 1 |
| Totals (19 entries) | | 42 | 42 | 41 | 125 |

- The medal changes due to doping disqualifications in the women's 400 m individual and relay events meant that China edged Japan to the top of the table. Kazakhstan fell from sixth to eighth place. Sri Lanka moved up from 19th to 15th place. Iraq received no medals.

== Participating countries ==
464 athletes from 40 nations competed

- Afghanistan (2)
- Bangladesh (2)
- Bahrain (10)
- Brunei (3)
- China (40)
- Chinese Taipei (16)
- Timor-Leste (1)
- Hong Kong (15)
- India (34)
- Indonesia (16)
- Iran (24)
- Iraq (10)
- Japan (87)
- Jordan (2)
- Kazakhstan (24)
- Kuwait (6)
- Kyrgyzstan (3)
- Laos (2)
- Lebanon (2)
- Macau (4)
- Maldives (2)
- Malaysia (8)
- Mongolia (6)
- Nepal (2)
- Oman (11)
- Pakistan (5)
- Palestine (2)
- Philippines (6)
- Qatar (6)
- Saudi Arabia (14)
- Singapore (6)
- South Korea (24)
- Sri Lanka (11)
- Syria (4)
- Tajikistan (2)
- Thailand (16)
- Turkmenistan (5)
- United Arab Emirates (7)
- Uzbekistan (17)
- Vietnam (7)
