= Liu Xiaosheng =

Chinese sprinter (born 1988)

Medal record

Men's athletics

Representing China

Asian Games
Bronze medal – third place	2010 Guangzhou	4×400 m

Asian Championships
Gold medal – first place	2009 Guangzhou	400 m
Silver medal – second place	2009 Guangzhou	4×400 m

Asian Indoor Championships
Gold medal – first place	2008 Doha	400 m

Liu Xiaosheng (刘孝生; born 5 January 1988) is a Chinese sprinter who specialized in the 400 metres. He became Asian champion indoors and outdoors and competed at one Olympic Games.

He was born in Raoping, Guangdong. In his early career he finished fifth at the 2004 National Student Games, and ran his first sub-47 in April 2005, when he recorded 46.91 seconds in Zhongshan. A season without individual results passed before he returned in 2007 to achieve a lifetime best of 45.79 seconds in Suzhou. He won the 2007 Chinese Junior Championships and the 2007 Chinese University Championships, followed by a victory at the 2007 Chinese Championships.

His first individual competition internationally was the 2008 Asian Indoor Championships in Qatar, which he won in 47.82 seconds. He followed with several victories, among others at the Osaka Grand Prix, in the buildup to the 2008 Summer Olympics on home soil, for which he qualified. The Olympic 400 metres, however, ended badly, with Liu Xiaosheng trailing far behind and clocking in 53 seconds. By October, he had recovered to win his second Chinese Championships.

2009 became a successful year. On the back of winning his third Chinese Championships, this time held in May, Liu Xiaosheng won the 400 metres event at the 2009 National Games of China, the 2009 Asian Championships and the 2009 East Asian Games. Entering the 4 × 400 metres relay, he won silver medals at both the Asian Championships and East Asian Games.

In 2010, however, he finished second at the Chinese Championships, fourth in the 2010 Asian Games individual 400 metres and won a bronze medal in the relay. In the following seasons, he entered smaller events on the meet circuit, before winning the relay race at the 2013 National Games of China.
