= Athletics at the 2010 Asian Games =

- Venue: Aoti Main Stadium; Guangzhou Triathlon Venue
- Dates: 21–27 November 2010
- Competitors: 574 from 41 nations

Athletics at the 2010 Asian Games was held in Guangzhou, China from 21 to 27 November 2010. A total of 47 events were contested – 24 by men and 23 by women – matching the Olympic athletics programme. The 42 track and field events on the programme were hosted at the Aoti Main Stadium (Guangdong Olympic Stadium) while the marathons and racewalking competitions took place around the city's University Town (sharing a venue with the triathlon). Sixteen Asian Games records were broken during the seven-day competition.

China, the host country, topped the medal table having won 13 gold medals and 36 medals overall. India (12 medals overall) and Bahrain both won five golds, but Japan (with four golds) had the second-largestoverall medal haul with twenty. A number of countries had double-digit medal totals: Kazakhstan and South Korea won four gold medals each, with hauls of eleven and ten medals respectively. Qatar, Saudi Arabia and Uzbekistan were the next best performing National Olympic Committees. A total of 574 athletes (comprising 351 men and 223 women) from 41 nations took part in the competition. Bhutan, Brunei, Jordan and Pakistan were the only nations without a representative in the events.

One of the primary attractions of the competition was Chinese Olympic champion hurdler Liu Xiang – the stadium filled with around 70,000 spectators on the day he defended his title and he won gold in a Games record time. Chinese women completed 1–2 podium finishes in the shot put, discus and hammer throws while Zhou Chunxiu and Zhu Xiaolin took the top two spots in the women's marathon. Japan's Chisato Fukushima took a 100/200 metres sprint double and also won a bronze in the relay. Preeja Sreedharan of India broke two national records, almost completing a 5000 and 10,000 metres double, but was beaten by Mimi Belete in the former event. Femi Ogunode – a Nigerian-born athlete representing Qatar – won golds in both the 200 m and 400 m at the age of nineteen. Little-known Lao Yi won the men's 100 m after the favourites (Masashi Eriguchi and Samuel Francis) were both eliminated in the semi-finals.

== Schedule ==
●	1st day	●	Final day	H	Heats	Q	Qualification	S	Semifinals	F	Final

Event↓/Date →	21st Sun	22nd Mon		23rd Tue	24th Wed	25th Thu	26th Fri	27th Sat
Men's 100 m	H	S	F					
Men's 200 m					H	F		
Men's 400 m	H	F						
Men's 800 m					H	F		
Men's 1500 m		H		F				
Men's 5000 m	F							
Men's 10,000 m							F	
Men's 110 m hurdles		H			F			
Men's 400 m hurdles					H	F		
Men's 3000 m steeplechase				F				
Men's 4 × 100 m relay				H			F	
Men's 4 × 400 m relay				H			F	
Men's marathon								F
Men's 20 km walk	F							
Men's 50 km walk						F		
Men's high jump	Q			F				
Men's pole vault		F						
Men's long jump					F			
Men's triple jump							F	
Men's shot put							F	
Men's discus throw					F			
Men's hammer throw	F							
Men's javelin throw							F	
Men's decathlon					●	●		
Women's 100 m	H	S	F					
Women's 200 m					H	F		
Women's 400 m	H	F						
Women's 800 m					H	F		
Women's 1500 m				F				
Women's 5000 m							F	
Women's 10,000 m	F							
Women's 100 m hurdles					H	F		
Women's 400 m hurdles					H	F		
Women's 3000 m steeplechase	F							
Women's 4 × 100 m relay				H			F	
Women's 4 × 400 m relay							F	
Women's marathon								F
Women's 20 km walk				F				
Women's high jump							F	
Women's pole vault					F			
Women's long jump				F				
Women's triple jump						F		
Women's shot put	F							
Women's discus throw				F				
Women's hammer throw		F						
Women's javelin throw						F		
Women's heptathlon		●		●				

== Medalists ==
=== Men ===
Event	Gold		Silver		Bronze	
100 m	Lao Yi; China	10.24	Yasir Al-Nashiri; Saudi Arabia	10.26	Barakat Al-Harthi; Oman	10.28
200 m	Femi Ogunode; Qatar	20.43	Kenji Fujimitsu; Japan	20.74	Omar Juma Al-Salfa; United Arab Emirates	20.83
400 m	Femi Ogunode; Qatar	45.12	Yuzo Kanemaru; Japan	45.32	Yousef Masrahi; Saudi Arabia	45.71
800 m	Sajjad Moradi; Iran	1:45.45; GR	Adnan Taess; Iraq	1:45.88	Musaeb Abdulrahman Balla; Qatar	1:46.19
1500 m	Mohammed Shaween; Saudi Arabia	3:36.49; GR	Sajjad Moradi; Iran	3:37.09	Belal Mansoor Ali; Bahrain	3:38.39
5000 m	Hasan Mahboob; Bahrain	13:47.86	James Kwalia; Qatar	13:48.55	Felix Kibore; Qatar	13:49.31
10,000 m	Bilisuma Shugi; Bahrain	27:32.72; GR	Essa Ismail Rashed; Qatar	27:33.09	Hasan Mahboob; Bahrain	27:40.07
110 m hurdles	Liu Xiang; China	13.09; GR	Shi Dongpeng; China	13.38	Park Tae-kyong; South Korea	13.48
400 m hurdles	Joseph Abraham; India	49.96	Bandar Sharahili; Saudi Arabia	50.29	Naohiro Kawakita; Japan	50.37
3000 m steeplechase	Tareq Mubarak Taher; Bahrain	8:25.89; GR	Thamer Kamal Ali; Qatar	8:26.27	Ali Al-Amri; Saudi Arabia	8:30.96
4 × 100 m relay	China; Lu Bin; Liang Jiahong; Su Bingtian; Lao Yi	38.78; GR	Chinese Taipei; Wang Wen-tang; Liu Yuan-kai; Tsai Meng-lin; Yi Wei-chen	39.05	Thailand; Poommanus Jankem; Wachara Sondee; Jirapong Meenapra; Sittichai Suwonprateep	39.09
4 × 400 m relay	Saudi Arabia; Ismail Al-Sabiani; Mohammed Al-Salhi; Hamed Al-Bishi; Yousef Masrahi	3:02.30	Japan; Yusuke Ishitsuka; Kenji Fujimitsu; Hideyuki Hirose; Yuzo Kanemaru	3:02.43	China; Lin Yang; Deng Shijie; Chang Pengben; Liu Xiaosheng	3:03.66
Marathon	Ji Young-jun; South Korea	2:11:11	Yukihiro Kitaoka; Japan	2:12:46	Mubarak Hassan Shami; Qatar	2:12:53
20 km walk	Wang Hao; China	1:20:50	Chu Yafei; China	1:21:57	Kim Hyun-sub; South Korea	1:22:47
50 km walk	Si Tianfeng; China	3:47:04; GR	Li Lei; China	3:47:34	Koichiro Morioka; Japan	3:47:41
High jump	Mutaz Barsham; Qatar	2.27	Hiromi Takahari; Japan	2.23	Rashid Al-Mannai; Qatar	2.19
High jump	Mutaz Barsham; Qatar	2.27	Hiromi Takahari; Japan	2.23	Huang Haiqiang; China	2.19
High jump	Mutaz Barsham; Qatar	2.27	Hiromi Takahari; Japan	2.23	Vitaliy Tsykunov; Kazakhstan	2.19
Pole vault	Yang Yansheng; China	5.50	Leonid Andreev; Uzbekistan	5.30	Shared silver	
Pole vault	Yang Yansheng; China	5.50	Kim Yoo-suk; South Korea	5.30	Shared silver	
Long jump	Kim Deok-hyeon; South Korea	8.11	Su Xiongfeng; China	8.05	Hussein Al-Sabee; Saudi Arabia	7.96
Triple jump	Li Yanxi; China	16.94	Yevgeniy Ektov; Kazakhstan	16.86	Cao Shuo; China	16.84
Shot put	Sultan Al-Hebshi; Saudi Arabia	20.57; GR	Zhang Jun; China	19.59	Chang Ming-huang; Chinese Taipei	19.48
Discus throw	Ehsan Haddadi; Iran	67.99; GR	Mohammad Samimi; Iran	63.46	Vikas Gowda; India	63.13
Hammer throw	Dilshod Nazarov; Tajikistan	76.44	Kaveh Mousavi; Iran	68.90	Hiroaki Doi; Japan	68.72
Javelin throw	Yukifumi Murakami; Japan	83.15	Park Jae-myong; South Korea	79.92	Rinat Tarzumanov; Uzbekistan	79.65
Decathlon	Dmitriy Karpov; Kazakhstan	8026	Kim Kun-woo; South Korea	7808	Vũ Văn Huyện; Vietnam	7755

=== Women ===
Event	Gold		Silver		Bronze	
100 m	Chisato Fukushima; Japan	11.33	Guzel Khubbieva; Uzbekistan	11.34	Vũ Thị Hương; Vietnam	11.43
200 m	Chisato Fukushima; Japan	23.62	Vũ Thị Hương; Vietnam	23.74	Guzel Khubbieva; Uzbekistan	23.87
400 m	Olga Tereshkova; Kazakhstan	51.97	Asami Chiba; Japan	52.68	Marina Maslyonko; Kazakhstan	52.70
800 m	Margarita Matsko; Kazakhstan	2:00.29	Trương Thanh Hằng; Vietnam	2:00.91	Tintu Luka; India	2:01.36
1500 m	Maryam Yusuf Jamal; Bahrain	4:08.22	Trương Thanh Hằng; Vietnam	4:09.58	Mimi Belete; Bahrain	4:10.42
5000 m	Mimi Belete; Bahrain	15:15.59	Preeja Sreedharan; India	15:15.89	Kavita Raut; India	15:16.54
10,000 m	Preeja Sreedharan; India	31:50.47	Kavita Raut; India	31:51.44	Shitaye Eshete; Bahrain	31:53.27
100 m hurdles	Lee Yeon-kyung; South Korea	13.23	Natalya Ivoninskaya; Kazakhstan	13.24	Sun Yawei; China	13.27
400 m hurdles	Ashwini Akkunji; India	56.15	Wang Xing; China	56.76	Satomi Kubokura; Japan	56.83
3000 m steeplechase	Sudha Singh; India	9:55.47; GR	Jin Yuan; China	9:55.71	Minori Hayakari; Japan	10:01.25
4 × 100 m relay	Thailand; Phatsorn Jaksuninkorn; Neeranuch Klomdee; Laphassaporn Tawoncharoen; Nongnuch Sanrat	44.09	China; Tao Yujia; Liang Qiuping; Jiang Lan; Ye Jiabei	44.22	Japan; Mayumi Watanabe; Momoko Takahashi; Yumeka Sano; Chisato Fukushima	44.41
4 × 400 m relay	India; Manjeet Kaur; Sini Jose; Ashwini Akkunji; Mandeep Kaur	3:29.02; GR	Kazakhstan; Marina Maslyonko; Viktoriya Yalovtseva; Margarita Matsko; Olga Tereshkova	3:30.03	China; Zheng Zhihui; Tang Xiaoyin; Chen Lin; Chen Jingwen	3:30.89
Marathon	Zhou Chunxiu; China	2:25:00	Zhu Xiaolin; China	2:26:35	Kim Kum-ok; North Korea	2:27:06
20 km walk	Liu Hong; China	1:30:06; GR	Masumi Fuchise; Japan	1:30:34	Li Yanfei; China	1:32:34
High jump	Svetlana Radzivil; Uzbekistan	1.95; GR	Nadiya Dusanova; Uzbekistan	1.93	Anna Ustinova; Kazakhstan	1.90
High jump	Svetlana Radzivil; Uzbekistan	1.95; GR	Nadiya Dusanova; Uzbekistan	1.93	Zheng Xingjuan; China	1.90
Pole vault	Li Caixia; China	4.30	Li Ling; China	4.30	Tomomi Abiko; Japan	4.15
Long jump	Jung Soon-ok; South Korea	6.53	Olga Rypakova; Kazakhstan	6.50	Yuliya Tarasova; Uzbekistan	6.49
Triple jump	Olga Rypakova; Kazakhstan	14.78; GR	Xie Limei; China	14.18	Thitima Muangjan; Thailand	13.85
Shot put	Li Ling; China	19.94	Gong Lijiao; China	19.67	Lee Mi-young; South Korea	17.51
Discus throw	Li Yanfeng; China	66.18; GR	Song Aimin; China	64.04	Krishna Poonia; India	61.94
Hammer throw	Zhang Wenxiu; China	72.84	Wang Zheng; China	68.17	Yuka Murofushi; Japan	62.94
Javelin throw	Yuki Ebihara; Japan	61.56; GR	Xue Juan; China	58.72	Li Lingwei; China	57.51
Heptathlon	Yuliya Tarasova; Uzbekistan	5783	Yuki Nakata; Japan	5606	Pramila Aiyappa; India	5415

== Medal table ==
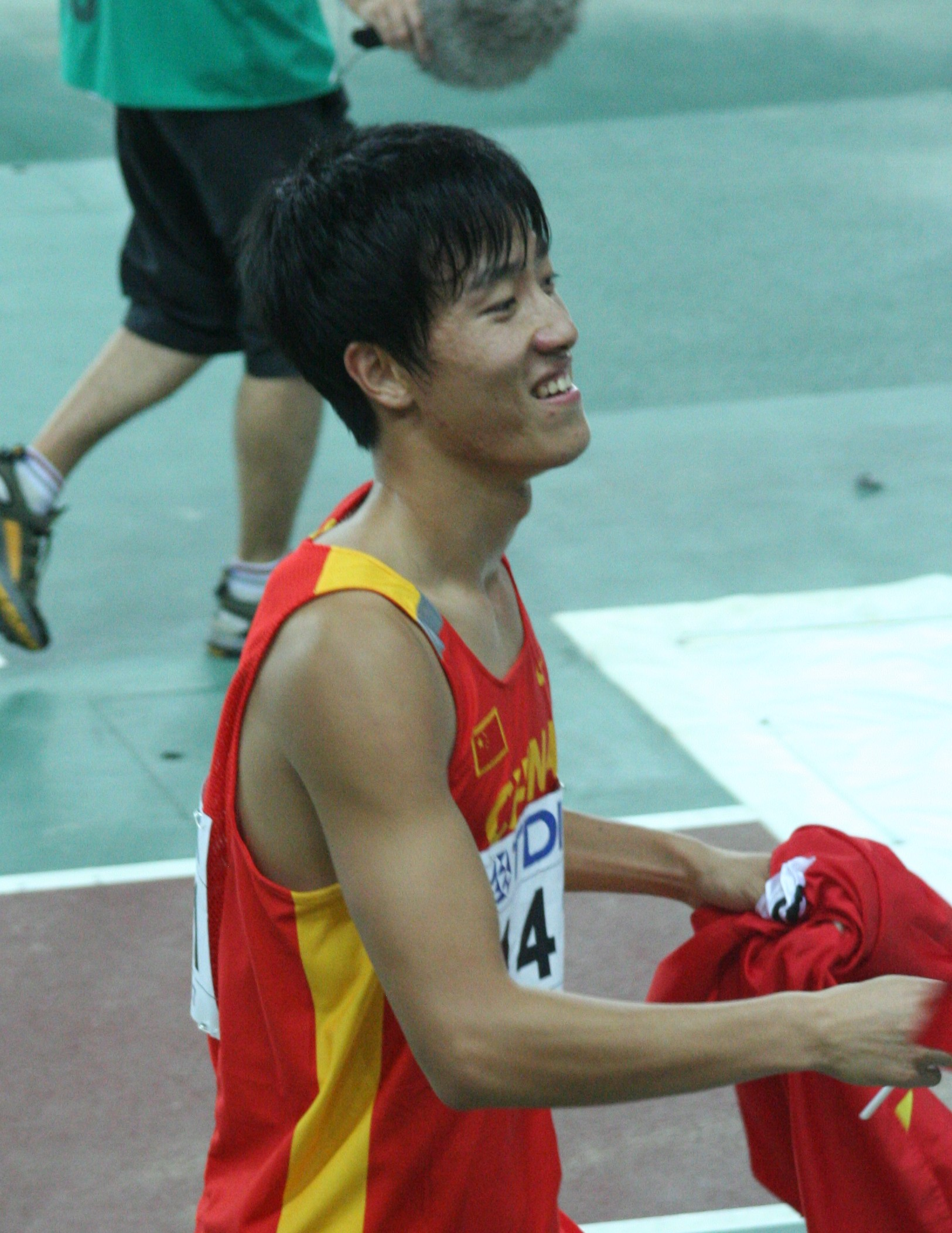
Liu Xiang retained his 110 m hurdles title to win gold for China.

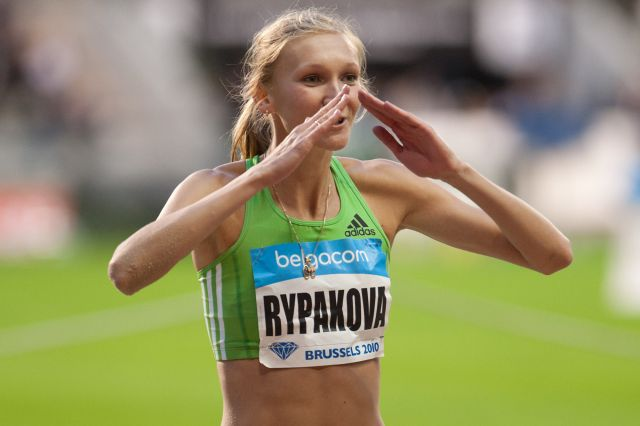
Olga Rypakova's gold and silver in the jumps helped Kazakhstan.

Rank	Nation	Gold	Silver	Bronze	Total
1	China (CHN)	13	15	8	36
2	India (IND)	5	2	5	12
3	Bahrain (BRN)	5	0	4	9
4	Japan (JPN)	4	8	8	20
5	Kazakhstan (KAZ)	4	4	3	11
6	South Korea (KOR)	4	3	3	10
7	Qatar (QAT)	3	3	4	10
8	Saudi Arabia (KSA)	3	2	3	8
9	Uzbekistan (UZB)	2	3	3	8
10	Iran (IRI)	2	3	0	5
11	Thailand (THA)	1	0	2	3
12	Tajikistan (TJK)	1	0	0	1
13	Vietnam (VIE)	0	3	2	5
14	Chinese Taipei (TPE)	0	1	1	2
15	Iraq (IRQ)	0	1	0	1
16	North Korea (PRK)	0	0	1	1
16	Oman (OMA)	0	0	1	1
16	United Arab Emirates (UAE)	0	0	1	1
Totals (18 entries)		47	48	49	144

== Participating nations ==
A total of 574 athletes from 41 nations competed in athletics at the 2010 Asian Games:

- Afghanistan (2)
- Athletes from Kuwait (12)
- Bahrain (21)
- Bangladesh (2)
- Cambodia (2)
- China (70)
- Chinese Taipei (17)
- Hong Kong (12)
- India (65)
- Indonesia (9)
- Iran (18)
- Iraq (11)
- Japan (58)
- Kazakhstan (21)
- Kyrgyzstan (7)
- Laos (2)
- Lebanon (2)
- Macau (6)
- Malaysia (7)
- Maldives (3)
- Mongolia (5)
- Myanmar (5)
- Nepal (8)
- North Korea (4)
- Oman (6)
- Palestine (4)
- Philippines (7)
- Qatar (17)
- Saudi Arabia (24)
- Singapore (8)
- South Korea (42)
- Sri Lanka (17)
- Syria (1)
- Tajikistan (4)
- Thailand (33)
- Timor-Leste (2)
- Turkmenistan (4)
- United Arab Emirates (9)
- Uzbekistan (13)
- Vietnam (9)
- Yemen (5)
