= Yuzo Kanemaru =

Japanese sprinter (born 1987)

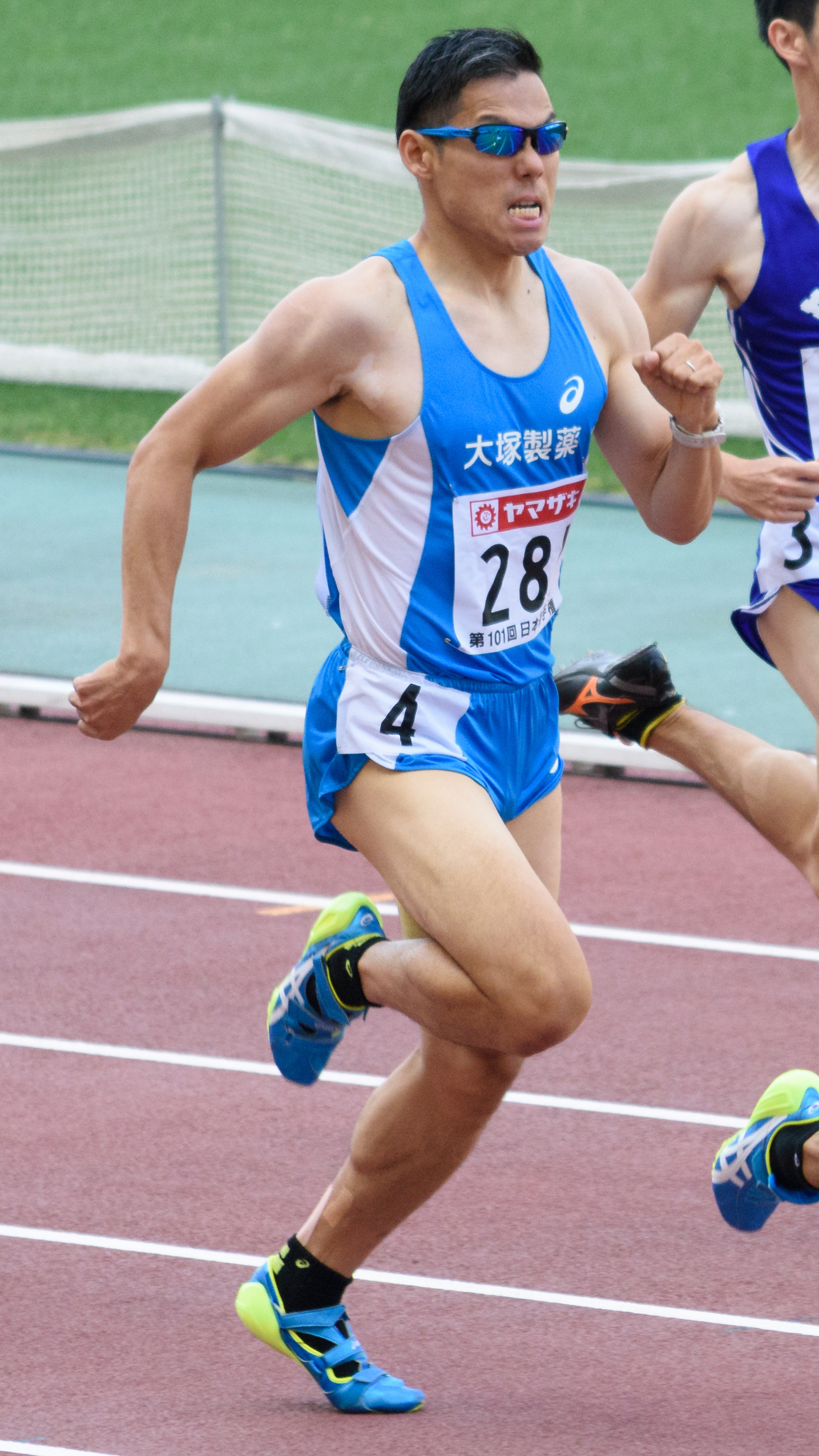

Personal information
- Born: 18 September 1987 (age 39) Takatsuki, Japan
- Height: 1.77 m (5 ft 9 1/2 in)
- Weight: 75 kg (165 lb)

Sport
- Country: Japan
- Sport: Athletics
- Event: 4 × 400m Relay
Medal record
Men's athletics
Representing Japan
Asian Games
Gold medal – first place	2014 Incheon	4x400 m
Silver medal – second place	2010 Guangzhou	400 m
Silver medal – second place	2010 Guangzhou	4x400 m
Asian Championships
Gold medal – first place	2005 Incheon	400 m
Gold medal – first place	2005 Incheon	4×400 m
Gold medal – first place	2009 Guangzhou	4×400 m
Gold medal – first place	2011 Kobe	4×400 m
Silver medal – second place	2009 Guangzhou	400 m
Silver medal – second place	2013 Pune	4×400 m
Bronze medal – third place	2011 Kobe	400 m
Bronze medal – third place	2013 Pune	400 m
Bronze medal – third place	2015 Wuhan	4×400 m
Summer Universiade
Gold medal – first place	2009 Belgrade	400 m
Bronze medal – third place	2009 Belgrade	4x400 m

Yūzō Kanemaru (金丸 祐三, Kanemaru Yūzō; born 18 September 1987) is a Japanese sprinter. He set his 400 metres personal best at the 2009 Osaka Grand Prix, finishing in 45.16 seconds.

== Competition record ==
Year	Competition	Venue	Position	Event	Notes
Representing Japan
2005	Asian Championships	Incheon, South Korea	1st	400 m	46.04
2005	Asian Championships	Incheon, South Korea	1st	4x400 m relay	3:03.51
2006	World Junior Championships	Beijing, China	7th	400 m	46.70
2006	World Junior Championships	Beijing, China	8th	4x400 m relay	3:16.61
2006	World Cup	Athens, Greece	7th	4x400 m relay	3:04.67
2006	Asian Games	Doha, Qatar	4th	400 m	46.47
2006	Asian Games	Doha, Qatar	4th	4x400 m relay	3:07.07
2007	World Championships	Osaka, Japan	–	400 m	DNF
2008	Olympic Games	Beijing, China	43rd (h)	400 m	46.39
2009	Universiade	Belgrade, Serbia	1st	400 m	45.68
2009	Universiade	Belgrade, Serbia	3rd	4x400 m relay	3:06.46
2009	World Championships	Berlin, Germany	38th (h)	400 m	46.83
2009	Asian Championships	Guangzhou, China	2nd	400 m	46.60
2009	Asian Championships	Guangzhou, China	1st	4x400 m relay	3:04.13
2010	Continental Cup	Split, Croatia	7th	400 m	45.95
2010	Asian Games	Guangzhou, China	2nd	400 m	45.32
2010	Asian Games	Guangzhou, China	2nd	4x400 m relay	3:02.43
2011	Asian Championships	Kobe, Japan	3rd	400 m	46.38
2011	Asian Championships	Kobe, Japan	3rd	4x400 m relay	3:04.72
2011	World Championships	Daegu, South Korea	20th (sf)	400 m	46.11
2011	World Championships	Daegu, South Korea	13th (h)	4x400 m relay	3:02.64
2012	Olympic Games	London, United Kingdom	28th (h)	400 m	46.01
2012	Olympic Games	London, United Kingdom	12th (h)	4x400 m relay	3:03.86
2013	World Championships	Moscow, Russia	23rd (sf)	400 m	46.28
2013	World Championships	Moscow, Russia	10th (h)	4x400 m relay	3:02.43
2014	World Indoor Championships	Sopot, Poland	10th (h)	4x400 m relay	3:12.63
2014	IAAF World Relays	Nassau, Bahamas	10th	4x400 m relay	3:03.24
2014	Continental Cup	Marrakesh, Morocco	8th	400 m	48.08
2014	Asian Games	Incheon, South Korea	4th	400 m	46.04
2014	Asian Games	Incheon, South Korea	1st	4x400 m relay	3:01.88
2015	Asian Championships	Wuhan, China	3rd	4x400 m relay	3:03.47
2015	World Championships	Beijing, China	37th (h)	400 m	45.65
2015	World Championships	Beijing, China	15th (h)	4x400 m relay	3:02.97
2016	Olympic Games	Rio de Janeiro, Brazil	47th (h)	400 m	48.38
2017	World Championships	London, United Kingdom	15th (h)	4x400 m relay	3:07.29

== Statistics ==
=== Personal bests ===
Event	Best	Location	Date
100 metres	10.32	Okayama, Japan	23 October 2005
200 metres	20.69	Yokohama, Japan	21 May 2006
300 metres	32.29	Izumo, Japan	19 April 2009
400 metres	45.16	Osaka, Japan	9 May 2009
