= Chen Jingwen =

Chinese sprinter (born 1990)

Personal information
- Born: 4 February 1990 (age 36) Guangzhou, China

Sport
- Country: China
- Sport: Athletics
Medal record
Women's athletics
Representing China
Asian Indoor Championships
Gold medal – first place	2012 Hangzhou	4 × 400 m
Silver medal – second place	2012 Hangzhou	400 m
Bronze medal – third place	2014 Hangzhou	4 × 400 m

Chen Jingwen (simplified Chinese: 陈静文; traditional Chinese: 陳靜文, born 4 February 1990 in Guangzhou) is a Chinese sprinter who specializes in the 400 metres.

She represented her country in the 4 × 400 metres relay event at the 2008 Summer Olympics but finished last in the heats. She went on to have a run of success in Asian competitions in 2009: she won the 400 m bronze and relay gold at the 11th Chinese National Games, won individual gold at the 2009 Asian Indoor Games, took a relay gold at the 2009 Asian Athletics Championships and beat compatriot Tang Xiaoyin to the gold medal at the 2009 East Asian Games.

Her personal best time is 52.18 seconds, achieved in November 2006 in Foshan. In the 200 metres she has 23.91 seconds, achieved in the same time and place.
