= 2009 Asian Athletics Championships =

2009 Asian Championships
- Dates: November 10–14
- Host city: Guangzhou, China
- Venue: Guangdong Olympic Stadium
- Events: 44
- Participation: 505 athletes from 37 nations

The 18th Asian Athletics Championships were held in Guangzhou, China in 2009.

== Results ==
=== Men ===
==== Track ====
Event	Gold		Silver		Bronze	
100 metres	Zhang Peimeng; China	10.28	Naoki Tsukahara; Japan	10.32	Guo Fan; China	10.37
200 metres	Omar Jouma Bilal Al-Salfa; United Arab Emirates	21.07	Shinji Takahira; Japan	21.08	Hitoshi Saito; Japan	21.10
400 metres	Liu Xiaosheng; China	46.55	Yuzo Kanemaru; Japan	46.60	Ismail Al-Sabiani; Saudi Arabia	46.84
800 metres	Sajjad Moradi; Iran	1:48.58	Mohammad Al-Azemi; Kuwait	1:48.93	Adnan Taes; Iraq	1:49.00
1500 metres	Mohammed Shaween; Saudi Arabia	3:46.08	Chaminda Wijekoon; Sri Lanka	3:47.01	Chatholi Hamza; India	3:48.44
5000 metres	James Kwalia; Qatar	14:02.90	Hasan Mahboob; Bahrain	14:03.44	Essa Ismail Rashed; Qatar	14:04.52
10,000 metres	Hasan Mahboob; Bahrain	28:23.70; CR	Nicholas Kemboi; Qatar	28:25.22	Ahmad Hassan Abdullah; Qatar	28:28.38
110 metres hurdles	Liu Xiang; China	13.50	Shi Dongpeng; China	13.67	Park Tae-kyong; South Korea	13.82
400 metres hurdles	Kenji Narisako; Japan	49.22	Joseph Abraham; India	49.96	Mubarak Al-Nubi; Qatar	50.19
3000 metres steeplechase	Tareq Mubarak Taher; Bahrain	8:33.58	Lin Xiangqian; China	8:34.13	Abubaker Ali Kamal; Qatar	8:34.73
20 kilometres walk	Li Jianbo; China	1:22:55	Chu Yafei; China	1:22:56	Park Chil-sung; South Korea	1:24:51
4×100 metres relay	Japan; Masashi Eriguchi; Naoki Tsukahara; Shinji Takahira; Kenji Fujimitsu	39.01	China; Guo Fan; Liang Jiahong; Su Bingtian; Zhang Peimeng	39.07	Chinese Taipei; Tu Chia-lin; Liu Yuan-kai; Tsai Meng-lin; Yi Wei-che	39.57
4×400 metres relay	Japan; Kenji Fujimitsu; Kenji Narisako; Hideyuki Hirose; Yuzo Kanemaru	3:04.13	China; Zhou Jie; Cui Haojing; Wang Youxin; Liu Xiaosheng	3:06.60	India; Harpreet Singh; Bibin Mathew; V. B. Bineesh; Shake Mortaja	3:06.83
WR world record | AR area record | CR championship record | GR games record | NR national record | OR Olympic record | PB personal best | SB season best | WL world leading (in a given season)

==== Field ====
Event	Gold		Silver		Bronze	
High jump	Manjula Kumara Wijesekara; Sri Lanka	2.23	Huang Haiqiang; China	2.23	Vitaliy Tsykunov; Kazakhstan	2.20
Pole vault	Liu Feiliang; China	5.60	Yang Quan; China	5.45	Daichi Sawano; Japan	5.45
Long jump	Li Jinzhe; China	8.16	Hussein Al-Sabee; Saudi Arabia	7.96	Yu Zhenwei; China	7.96
Triple jump	Roman Valiyev; Kazakhstan	16.70	Zhu Shujing; China	16.67	Yevgeniy Ektov; Kazakhstan	16.49
Shot put	Om Prakash Singh; India	19.87; CR	Chang Ming-huang; Chinese Taipei	19.34	Zhang Jun; China	19.15
Discus throw	Ehsan Haddadi; Iran	64.83	Mohammad Samimi; Iran	64.01	Wu Tao; China	59.27
Hammer throw	Dilshod Nazarov; Tajikistan	76.92	Ali Al-Zinkawi; Kuwait	73.45	Ma Liang; China	70.08
Javelin throw	Yukifumi Murakami; Japan	81.50	Wang Qingbo; China	80.25	Qin Qiang; China	80.08
Decathlon	Hiromasa Tanaka; Japan	7515 pts	Hadi Sepehrzad; Iran	7262 pts	Zhu Hengjun; China	7200 pts
WR world record | AR area record | CR championship record | GR games record | NR national record | OR Olympic record | PB personal best | SB season best | WL world leading (in a given season)

=== Women ===
==== Track ====
Event	Gold		Silver		Bronze	
100 metres	Chisato Fukushima; Japan	11.27	Vu Thi Huong; Vietnam	11.50	Hiriyur Manjunath Jyothi; India	11.60
200 metres	Momoko Takahashi; Japan	23.53	Vu Thi Huong; Vietnam	23.61	Jiang Lan; China	23.65
400 metres	Asami Tanno; Japan	53.32	Chen Lin; China	53.55	Manjit Kaur; India	53.66
800 metres	Zhou Haiyan; China	2:04.89	Margarita Matsko; Kazakhstan	2:05.31	Truong Thanh Hang; Vietnam	2:05.33
1500 metres	Zhou Haiyan; China	4:32.74	Liu Fang; China	4:33.35	Truong Thanh Hang; Vietnam	4:33.46
5000 metres	Xue Fei; China	16:05.19	Tejitu Daba Chalchissa; Bahrain	16:05.45	Kavita Raut; India	16:05.90
10,000 metres	Bai Xue; China	34:11.14	Kavita Raut; India	34:17.21	Wang Jiali; China	34:22.64
100 metres hurdles	Sun Yawei; China	13.19	Asuka Terada; Japan	13.20	Dedeh Erawati; Indonesia	13.32
400 metres hurdles	Satomi Kubokura; Japan	56.62	Noraseela Mohd Khalid; Malaysia	57.15	Natalya Asanova; Uzbekistan	59.37
3000 metres steeplechase	Yoshika Tatsumi; Japan	10:05.94; CR	Sudha Singh; India	10:10.77	Kiran Tiwari; India	10:34.55
20 kilometres walk	Mayumi Kawasaki; Japan	1:30:12; CR	Yang Yawei; China	1:34:11	Svetlana Tolstaya; Kazakhstan	1:36:42
4×100 metres relay	Japan; Maki Wada; Chisato Fukushima; Mayumi Watanabe; Momoko Takahashi	43.93	Thailand; Jintara Seangdee; Phatsorn Jaksuninkorn; Jutamass Tawoncharoen; Nongnuch Sanrat	44.55	South Korea; Lee Sun-Ae; Kim Ji-Eun; Kim Ha-Na; Kim Cho-Rong	45.46
4×400 metres relay	China; Chen Yanmei; Tang Xiaoyin; Chen Jingwen; Chen Lin	3:31.08	India; Mandeep Kaur; Sini Jose; Chitra K. Soman; Manjit Kaur	3:31.62	Japan; Satomi Kubokura; Mayumi Watanabe; Mayu Sato; Asami Tanno	3:31.95
WR world record | AR area record | CR championship record | GR games record | NR national record | OR Olympic record | PB personal best | SB season best | WL world leading (in a given season)

==== Field ====
Event	Gold		Silver		Bronze	
High jump	Zheng Xingjuan; China	1.93	Nadiya Dusanova; Uzbekistan	1.90	Svetlana Radzivil; Uzbekistan	1.87
Pole vault	Li Caixia; China	4.30	Wu Sha; China	4.15	Choi Yun-Hee; South Korea	4.00
Long jump	Marestella Torres; Philippines	6.51	Chen Yaling; China	6.28	Sachiko Masumi; Japan	6.28
Triple jump	Olga Rypakova; Kazakhstan	14.53	Xu Tingting; China	14.11	Irina Litvinenko; Kazakhstan	13.99
Shot put	Gong Lijiao; China	19.04	Liu Xiangrong; China	17.55	Leila Rajabi; Iran	16.71
Discus throw	Song Aimin; China	63.90	Ma Xuejun; China	63.63	Krishna Poonia; India	59.84
Hammer throw	Zhang Wenxiu; China	72.07; CR	Hao Shuai; China	65.87	Yuka Murofushi; Japan	61.99
Javelin throw	Liu Chunhua; China	57.93	Li Lingwei; China	55.13	Kim Kyong-Ae; South Korea	53.84
Heptathlon	Yuliya Tarasova; Uzbekistan	5840 pts	Yuki Nakata; Japan	5582 pts	Mei Yiduo; China	5460 pts
WR world record | AR area record | CR championship record | GR games record | NR national record | OR Olympic record | PB personal best | SB season best | WL world leading (in a given season)

== Medal table ==
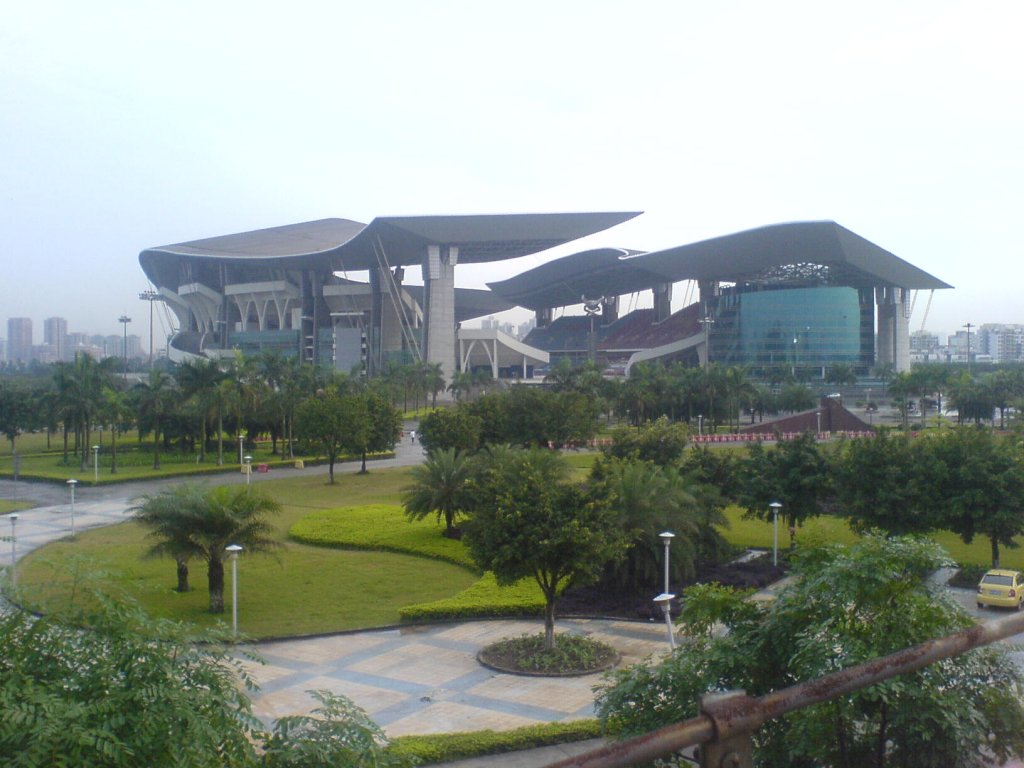
The host venue for the championships – the Guangdong Olympic Stadium

* Host nation (China)

Rank	Nation	Gold	Silver	Bronze	Total
1	China*	18	19	10	47
2	Japan	12	5	5	22
3	Iran	2	2	1	5
4	Bahrain	2	2	0	4
5	Kazakhstan	2	1	4	7
6	India	1	4	7	12
7	Qatar	1	1	4	6
8	Uzbekistan	1	1	2	4
9	Saudi Arabia	1	1	1	3
10	Sri Lanka	1	1	0	2
11	Philippines	1	0	0	1
11	Tajikistan	1	0	0	1
11	United Arab Emirates	1	0	0	1
14	Vietnam	0	2	2	4
15	Kuwait	0	2	0	2
16	Chinese Taipei	0	1	1	2
17	Malaysia	0	1	0	1
17	Thailand	0	1	0	1
19	South Korea	0	0	5	5
20	Indonesia	0	0	1	1
20	Iraq	0	0	1	1
Totals (21 entries)		44	44	44	132

== Participating nations ==
- Bahrain (12)
- Bangladesh (1)
- Brunei (1)
- China (77)
- Chinese Taipei (22)
- Hong Kong (16)
- India (53)
- Indonesia (6)
- Iran (15)
- Iraq (5)
- Japan (55)
- Jordan (5)
- Kazakhstan (23)
- Kuwait (9)
- Kyrgyzstan (3)
- Laos (1)
- Lebanon (2)
- Macau (4)
- Malaysia (17)
- Maldives (1)
- Mongolia (6)
- Nepal (4)
- North Korea (3)
- Oman (5)
- Philippines (5)
- Qatar (9)
- Saudi Arabia (17)
- Singapore (10)
- South Korea (26)
- Sri Lanka (21)
- Syria (4)
- Tajikistan (5)
- Thailand (25)
- Turkmenistan (2)
- United Arab Emirates (6)
- Uzbekistan (19)
- Vietnam (10)
