= Ismail Al-Sabiani =

Saudi Arabian sprinter

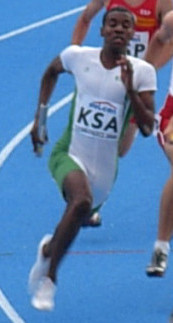
- Ismail Al-Sabiani in 2008

Personal information
- Born: 25 April 1989 (age 37) Jeddah, Saudi Arabia
Medal record
Men's athletics
Representing Saudi Arabia
Asian Games
Gold medal – first place	2006 Doha	4×400 m relay
Gold medal – first place	2010 Guangzhou	4×400 m relay
Asian Indoor Games
Gold medal – first place	2009 Hanoi	400 m
Gold medal – first place	2009 Hanoi	4x400 m relay
Asian Championships
Gold medal – first place	2007 Amman	4x400 m relay
Gold medal – first place	2013 Pune	4x400 m relay
Bronze medal – third place	2009 Guangzhou	400 m
Asian Indoor Championships
Gold medal – first place	2008 Doha	4x400 m relay
Military World Games
Gold medal – first place	2007 Hyderabad	4x400 m relay
Islamic Solidarity Games
Gold medal – first place	2013 Palembang	4x400 m relay
Pan Arab Games
Gold medal – first place	2007 Cairo	4x400 m relay
Arab Championships
Silver medal – second place	2013 Doha	400 m
Asian Junior Championships
Gold medal – first place	2008 Jakarta	400 m
Bronze medal – third place	2008 Jakarta	4x400 m relay

Ismail Al-Sabiani (Arabic: إسماعيل الصبياني, born 25 April 1989 in Jeddah) is a Saudi Arabian track and field athlete who specialises in the 400 metres.

== Career ==
He began competing internationally at sixteen years old, running in the heats of the 800 metres at the 2005 World Youth Championships in Athletics. His first major senior tournament came the following year in the form of the 2006 Asian Games. Although he was eliminated in the heats of the 400 m, he won the gold medal in the 4×400 m relay with the Saudi team including Hamdan Odha Al-Bishi, Hamed Hamadan Al-Bishi and Mohammed Al-Salhi. Al-Sabiani secured a second relay gold at the 2007 Asian Athletics Championships and was the youngest athlete in the 400 m final, finishing in seventh. He was selected for the 2007 Pan Arab Games later in the year and broke 47 seconds for the first time with a personal best run of 46.99 sec in the heats. He also won another gold with the Saudi relay team.

Al-Sabiani started the next year at the 2008 Asian Indoor Athletics Championships and helped the relay team to victory in a Championship record time of 3:14.25. At the 2008 Asian Junior Athletics Championships in Jakarta he set a new best of 46.33 sec to take the 400 m gold and also won the relay bronze medal. Following this, he competed on the global stage at the 2008 World Junior Championships in Athletics and reached the semi-finals of the 400 m.

The 2009 season saw him progress into the senior ranks. He took victory at the 2009 Asian Indoor Games in November with a national indoor record run of 47.31 sec. He set a second national indoor record the following day, as he helped the Saudi team to the relay gold in a time of 3:10.31 (also a Games record). He won his first outdoor senior medal in the 400 m later that month, finishing behind Liu Xiaosheng and Yuzo Kanemaru to take the bronze medal at the 2009 Asian Athletics Championships. The following year, he started off the Saudi relay team to a gold medal win in national record time (3:02.30 min) at the 2010 Asian Games.
