= Serkan Yıldırım =

Turkish Paralympic athlete (born 1991)

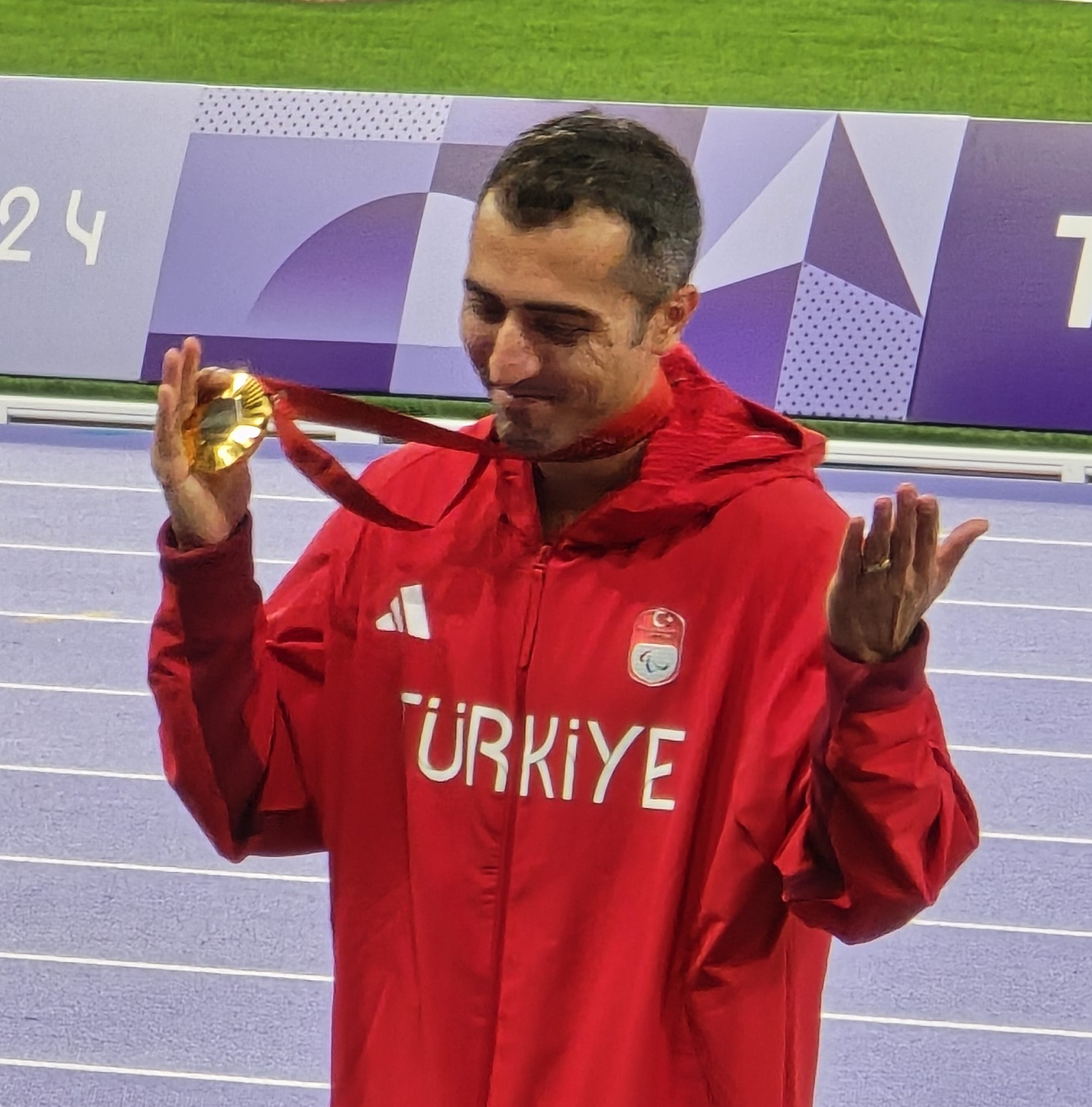
- Yilidirim on the podium at the 2024 Paralympics in Paris, with his later rescinded Gold Medal.

Personal information
- Native name: سجاد هاشمی آهنگری
- Born: Sajjad Hashemi Ahangari; 22 August 1991 (age 35) Tabriz, Iran
- Height: 1.78 m (5 ft 10 in)
- Weight: 69 kg (152 lb)

Sport
- Country: Iran (2007–2022); Turkey (2022–Present)
- Sport: Athletics, Para-athletics
- Disability class: T12 (Under Review)
- Events: 100m, 200m, 400m
Medal record
Men's Track and field
Representing Iran
Asian Championships
| Bronze medal – third place | 2011 Kobe | 4×400 m relay |
Asian Indoor Athletics Championships
| Silver medal – second place | 2016 Qatar | 4×400 m relay |
| Bronze medal – third place | 2018 Tehran | 4×400 m relay |
Military World Games
| Gold medal – first place | 2011 Rio de Janeiro | 400 m |
Representing Turkey
Paralympic Games
| Disqualified | 2024 Paris | 100 m T12 |
Representing Turkey
World Championships
| Gold medal – first place | 2024 Kobe | 100 m T12 |
| Gold medal – first place | 2024 Kobe | 400 m T12 |

Serkan Yıldırım (born Persian: سجاد هاشمی آهنگری; Latin: Sajjad Hashemi Ahangari on 22 August 1991 in Tabriz) is an Iranian-born Turkish athlete. He has competed at both the Olympic and Paralympic Games competing in the 100 m and 400 m sprint events, as well as being a World Champion and World Record holder in the T12 classification.

== Sport career ==
=== In Iran ===
He was a semi-finalist in the event at the 2007 World Youth Championships in Athletics and came fifth at the 2008 Asian Junior Athletics Championships the following year. He returned for the 2010 Asian Junior Athletics Championships and won the 400 m, as well as taking a relay bronze medal and setting a 200 metres national record of 21.09 seconds for fourth place. At the West Asian Championships in Aleppo, Hashemi ran a national junior record of 46.57 seconds to win the 400 m, then (with a team including Reza Bouazar, Sajjad Moradi and Edward Mangasar) he broke the Iranian record for 4×400 metres relay with a time of 3:07.87 minutes.

He was chosen for the 400 m and relay team at the 2010 Asian Games, but did not get past the first round in either event. He established himself in the senior ranks in 2011 by taking the 200 m and 400 m Iranian titles. He came fourth in the 400 m at the 2011 Asian Athletics Championships, just behind Yuzo Kanemaru, and anchored the Iranian 4×400 m relay team to the bronze medal. The 2011 Military World Games in July saw Hashemi break the national record in the 400 m with a run of 45.81 seconds, as he defeated Kenya's Mark Mutai to take the gold medal.

Hashemi ran the 400 m for Iran at the 2012 Summer Olympics.

In 2016, Hashemi was part of the Iranian team that won the silver medal in the men's 4 × 400 m at the Asian Indoor Athletics Champions. In 2018, the team, also including Hashemi, won bronze. He continued to compete for Iran until September 2022.

=== In Turkey ===
Yıldırım had to give up his able-bodied athletics career as he was not able to see the track lines due to an increasing reduction of visual acuity. He then began to compete as a para-athlete for Turkey after he was classified into the B2 classification.

He captured gold medals in the 100 m T12 and 400 m T12 events at the 2024 World Para Athletics Championships in Kobe, Japan. He set a new championship record in the 100 m T12 event with 10.53.

With these results, he secured a quota for participation at the 2024 Summer Paralympics in Paris, France.

==== Classification dispute ====
After Yıldırım won the gold medal by breaking the championship record in the 100 m and the world record in the 400 m at the World Para Athletics Championships in Kobe, Japan in May 2024, the World Para Athletics Federation (WPA), which is affiliated with the International Paralympic Committee (IPC), initiated in June a process for his disability classification, after concerns were raised about his level of visual impairment. His approved classification status was changed to 'Under Review', it was announced that he would not be able to compete at the 2024 Paris Paralympic Games. The Turkish National Paralympic Committee (TMPK) made objections to the IPC and WPA, but the efforts were unsuccessful.

The TMPK filed for an injunction in a Bonn regional court against the WPA, which is subject to German law. On 29 August 2024 at 19:24 local time, one day after the opening ceremony of the Games, the judge approved an injunction allowing Yıldırım to compete. The WPA who had been unaware of the injunction, complied pending their own appeal against the decision. Notifying the Turkish delegation at 02:00 hours local time on 30 August, eight hours before the start of Yıldırım's 100 m competition.

==== Competition and post-disqualification ====
Yıldırım eventually competed in the 100 m T12 event on 30 August 2024. He initially claimed Gold, but on 3 September 2024, he was disqualified from the 100m T12, his gold medal was revoked and his name was removed from the entry list of the 400 m T12, after the WPA's appeal against the injunction was upheld. The TMPK announced that it will resolutely fight for Yıldırım's reinstatement.

== Personal life ==
Sajjad Hashemi Ahangari was born in Tabriz, Iran, on 22 August 1991. He is fluent in Azerbaijani, Turkish, and Persian languages.
