= Bibin Mathew =

Indian sprinter (born 1987)

Medal record

Men's athletics

Representing India

Asian Championships
Bronze medal – third place	2009 Guangzhou	4×400 m

Asian Indoor Championships
Gold medal – first place	2010 Tehran	400 m
Silver medal – second place	2010 Tehran	4×400 m

South Asian Games
Gold medal – first place	2010 Dhaka	400 m
Gold medal – first place	2010 Dhaka	4×400 m

Bibin Mathew (born 16 January 1987) is an Indian track and field sprinter who competes in the 400 metres. He was the 2010 Asian Indoor Champion in the event and is a two-time South Asian Games gold medallist. He holds the Indian indoor record at 47.81 seconds, set in 2010.

Mathew has also represented India at the Commonwealth Games, Asian Games and the Asian Athletics Championships.

== Career ==
Hailing from Kerala, he made his breakthrough in 2007 when he won the 400 m title at the 2007 National Games of India and also won the event at the Indian Athletics Championships, in the absence of national record holder K. M. Binu. He was a 400 m semi-finalist at the 2007 Asian Indoor Games, setting an Indian indoor record of 48.83 seconds on his international debut. He broke a second national record at the competition in the 4×400 metres relay, running 3:16.81 minutes for fifth place with Gurvinderpal Singh, V.B. Bineesh, and Vinay Choudhary.

Mathew took his second national title the following year, where he ran a personal best of 46.81 seconds. He competed extensively in 2009: he ran a new best of 46.16 seconds as part of three wins on the national circuit and ran on the Asian Athletics Grand Prix for the first time and was in the top two at each meeting. He suffered from a virus in September and was beaten at the national championships by S. K. Mortaja. Both he and Mortaja represented India at the 2009 Asian Athletics Championships, but they missed out on the medals, finishing fourth and fifth respectively. A team of Harpreet Singh, Mathew, Bineesh and Mortaja took the bronze medal in the 4×400 m relay.

Mathew won an individual and relay double at the 2010 South Asian Games in February. Later that month he set a championship record and Indian indoor record of 47.81 seconds to win the gold medal at the 2010 Asian Indoor Athletics Championships. He also shared in the relay silver medal at the event. He made two other international outings with the relay team that year, coming seventh at the 2010 Commonwealth Games in New Delhi and fourth at the 2010 Asian Games. He also ran individually at the Asian competition, but did not get beyond the heats.

He struggled to regain his previous form after 2010. At the 2011 Indian National Games he was beaten into second place by Kunhu Muhammed Puthanpurakkal. He dropped further down the order at the 2012 Indian Championships, placing third behind Arokia Rajiv and Mortaja. He dipped under 47 seconds in April 2013, but his time of 46.94 seconds was only enough for third at the Indian Federation's Cup
