= Guangdong Olympic Stadium =

Football stadium in Guangzhou, China

Coordinates: 23°8′15.56″N 113°24′12.67″E

Guangdong Olympic Sports Centre Stadium
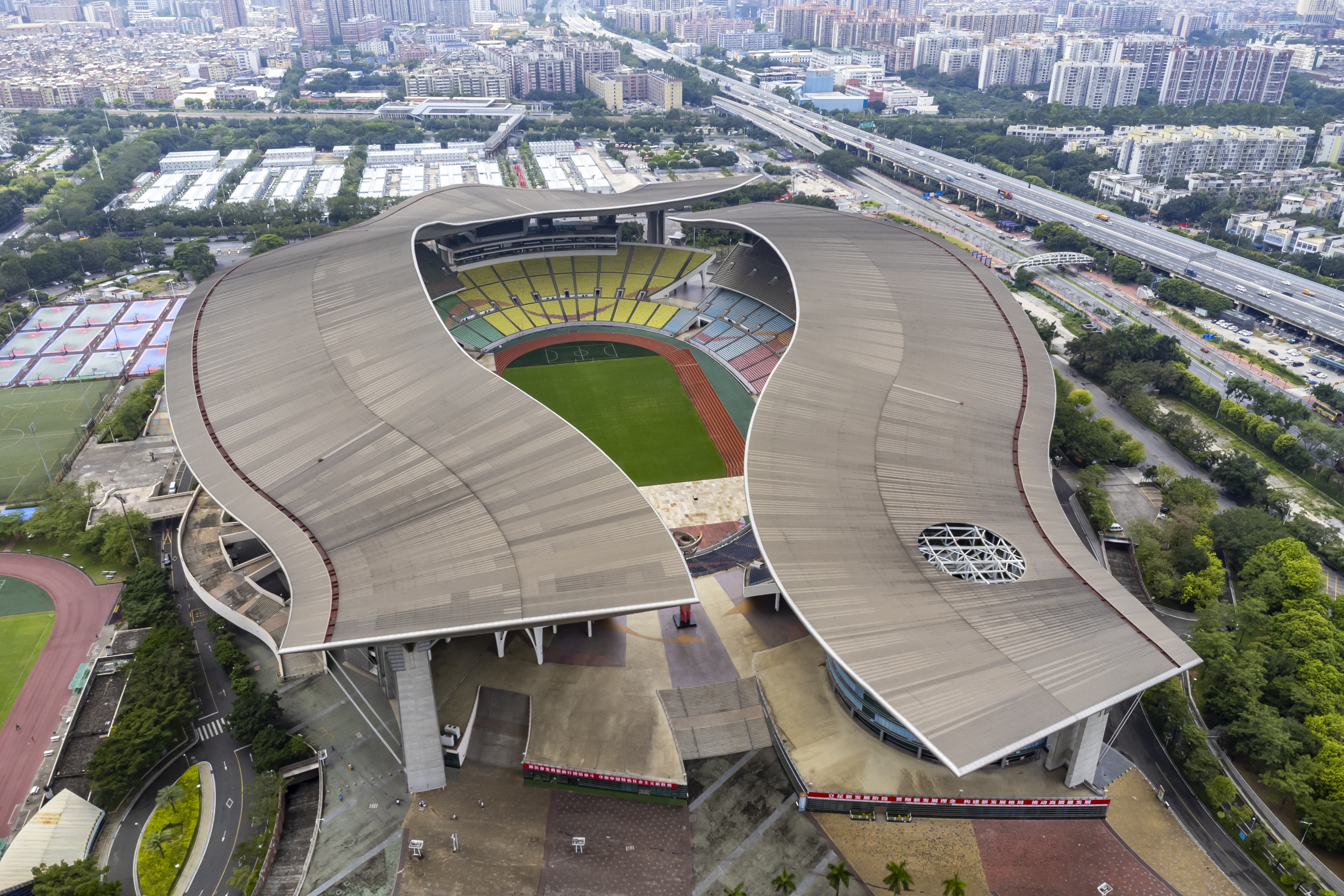
- Interactive map of Guangdong Olympic Sports Centre Stadium
- Location: 36 Daguan S Rd, Huangcun Ward, Tianhe District, Guangzhou, Guangdong, China
- Owner: Guangdong People's Government
- Operator: Guangdong Sports Bureau
- Capacity: 80,012
- Surface: Grass
- Public transit: 4 21 at Huangcun

Construction
- Groundbreaking: 31 December 1998
- Built: 1999–2001
- Opened: 22 September 2001
- Cost: 1.23 billion RMB
- Architect: Ellerbe Becket

Guangdong Olympic Stadium
- Traditional Chinese: 廣東奧林匹克體育中心
- Simplified Chinese: 广东奥林匹克体育中心
Transcriptions
Standard Mandarin
- Hanyu Pinyin: Guǎngdōng Àolínpǐkè tǐyù zhōngxīn
Yue: Cantonese
- Jyutping: gwong2 dung1 ou3 lam4 pat1 hak1 tai2 juk6 zung1 sam1

The Guangdong Olympic Sports Centre Stadium (Chinese: 广东奥林匹克体育中心) is a multi-purpose stadium in Guangzhou, Guangdong, China. Currently used mostly for football matches, the stadium was opened in 2001. It has a capacity of 80,012, making it one of the largest stadiums in the country by seating capacity.

== History ==
Guangdong Olympic Stadium broke ground on 31 December 1998 at the former site of Huangcun Airport. It opened to the public for the Ninth National Games of China in 2001. It was originally planned to help host the 2008 Summer Olympics until a decision was made to construct the National Stadium in Beijing. The original design for the Guangdong Olympic Stadium was announced in 1999. Taking Guangzhou's nickname, the Flower City, the American architectural firm of Ellerbe Becket designed Guangdong Olympic Stadium's sunscreen roof to resemble layers of petals on a flower. The design firm stated in its press release: "The stadium bowl grows out of the ground to a sculpted upper edge, like the petals of a flower. Floating above the bowl is a shimmering ribbon of roof flowing like a wave over the seats. It parts at the ends and holds the Olympic flame, suspended between the two ribbons. A hotel surrounds a circular opening in the roof that forms a vertical tower of light, which at night is visible for a great distance." The stadium's multi-colored seats are positioned in multiple sections that are visually connected via a ribbon pattern. In 2025, new seats were installed.

== Major events ==
- Guangzhou Pharmaceutical F.C. hosted the English Premier League champions Manchester United here on 27 July 2007.
- Guangzhou Pharmaceutical F.C. hosted Chelsea on 23 July 2008 in Chelsea's first-ever trip to China.
- The stadium hosted the athletics events of the 2010 Asian Games and Asian Para Games, as well as the opening and closing ceremonies of the Asian Para Games. The ceremonies for 2010 Asian Games were held at a stand at Haixinsha Island in Tianhe District.
- Westlife's The Wild Dreams Tour on 16 September 2023
- The World Athletics Relays on 10 and 11 May 2025

== See also ==
- Lists of stadiums

Preceded by Amman International Stadium; Amman	Asian Athletics Championships; Venue; 2009	Succeeded by Kobe Universiade Memorial Stadium
Preceded by Khalifa International Stadium; Doha	Asian Games; Athletics competitions Main venue 2010	Succeeded by Incheon Asiad Main Stadium; Incheon
Preceded by Jassim bin Hamad Stadium; Doha	Asian Games Men's Football tournament Final Venue; 2010	Succeeded by Incheon Munhak Stadium; Incheon
Preceded by {{{before}}}	Asian Para Games; Opening and Closing Ceremonies; 2010	Succeeded by Incheon Munhak Stadium; Incheon
Preceded by {{{before}}}	Asian Para Games; Athletics competitions Main venue 2010	Succeeded by Incheon Asiad Main Stadium; Incheon
