= Athletics at the 2010 Asian Games – Women's 400 metres =

Women's 400 metres at the 2010 Asian Games
- Venue: Aoti Main Stadium
- Dates: 21–22 November 2010
- Competitors: 16 from 11 nations

Medalists
gold medal	Olga Tereshkova	Kazakhstan
silver medal	Asami Chiba	Japan
bronze medal	Marina Maslyonko	Kazakhstan

The women's 400 metres event at the 2010 Asian Games was held at the Aoti Main Stadium, Guangzhou, China on 21–22 November.

== Schedule ==
All times are China Standard Time (UTC+08:00)

Date	Time	Event
Sunday, 21 November 2010	18:40	Round 1
Monday, 22 November 2010	17:50	Final

== Records ==
Prior to this competition, the existing world, Asian and Games records were as follows.

World Record	Marita Koch (GDR)	47.60	Canberra, Australia	6 October 1985
Asian Record	Ma Yuqin (CHN)	49.81	Beijing, China	11 September 1993
Games Record	Damayanthi Dharsha (SRI)	51.13	Busan, South Korea	10 October 2002

== Results ==
=== Round 1 ===
- Qualification: First 3 in each heat (Q) and the next 2 fastest (q) advance to the final.

==== Heat 1 ====
Rank	Athlete	Time	Notes
1	Marina Maslyonko (KAZ)	52.35	Q
2	Asami Chiba (JPN)	52.66	Q
3	Manjeet Kaur (IND)	53.13	Q
4	Chandrika Subashini (SRI)	53.22	q
5	Tang Xiaoyin (CHN)	53.26	q
6	Gulustan Mahmood (IRQ)	53.44	
7	Treewadee Yongphan (THA)	56.59	
8	Suzana Zukhairi (YEM)	1:07.98	

==== Heat 2 ====
Rank	Athlete	Time	Notes
1	Olga Tereshkova (KAZ)	53.52	Q
2	Chen Lin (CHN)	53.88	Q
3	Mandeep Kaur (IND)	53.93	Q
4	Chisato Tanaka (JPN)	53.99	
5	Dana Hussein (IRQ)	56.35	
6	Lam Ka Im (MAC)	57.69	
7	Sabitri Nepali (NEP)	1:02.63	
8	Sandra Jalayta (PLE)	1:14.71	

=== Final ===
Rank	Athlete	Time	Notes
1st place, gold medalist(s)	Olga Tereshkova (KAZ)	51.97	
2nd place, silver medalist(s)	Asami Chiba (JPN)	52.68	
3rd place, bronze medalist(s)	Marina Maslyonko (KAZ)	52.70	
4	Mandeep Kaur (IND)	52.99	
5	Manjeet Kaur (IND)	53.27	
6	Tang Xiaoyin (CHN)	53.55	
7	Chen Lin (CHN)	53.82	
8	Chandrika Subashini (SRI)	55.05	
