= Pinki Pramanik =

Former Indian track and field athlete (born 1986)

Medal record

Women's athletics

Representing India

Asian Games
Gold medal – first place	2006 Doha	4×400 m

Asian Championships
Bronze medal – third place	2003 Manila	4×400 m

Asian Indoor Games
Gold medal – first place	2005 Pattaya	4×400 m

Asian Indoor Athletics Championships
Bronze medal – third place	2004 Tehran	400 m
Bronze medal – third place	2004 Tehran	800 m

South Asian Games
Gold medal – first place	2006 Colombo	400 m
Gold medal – first place	2006 Colombo	800 m
Gold medal – first place	2006 Colombo	4×400 m

Commonwealth Games
Silver medal – second place	2006 Melbourne	4×400 m

Pinki Pramanik (born 10 April 1986 in Purulia) is an Indian former track and field athlete who specialised in 400- and 800-metre events. As part of the national 4×400 metres relay team, Pramanik won the silver medal at the 2006 Commonwealth Games and the gold medal at the 2005 Asian Indoor Games and 2006 Asian Games. She won three gold medals at the 2006 South Asian Games, winning the 400 and 800m events and as a member of the relay team.

Pramanik won two bronze medals at the Asian Indoor Athletics Championships at age 17, and represented Asia at the IAAF World Cup. She won three times at the All-India Open National Championships.

== Career ==
Pramanik set four junior state records in 2002. She made her world debut at the 2003 World Youth Championships in Athletics (where she reached the 800 m semifinals), and won the 400 m race at the All-India Open National Championships soon afterwards. Pramanik set a record at the National Junior Athletics meet, running 54.92 seconds in the 400 m, although it was uncertain whether she was born in 1986 or 1987.

=== International medals ===
Pramanik won two bronze medals in the 400 m and 800 m at the 2004 Asian Indoor Athletics Championships. In late 2004, a group of youths planted a gun on her and called police. Eyewitnesses testified that the youths had harassed Pramanik and placed the gun in her bag, and she was released without charge. She took three months off from competition to recover from the stress of the incident.

When Pramanik returned to competition in 2005, she won a gold medal as part of the 4×400 metres relay team at the 2005 Asian Indoor Games with Iyleen Samantha, Santhi Soundarajan, and Mandeep Kaur. That year, she won 400 and 800 m gold medals at the All-India Open National Championships. The 2006 Commonwealth Games was Pramanik's first appearance at the world senior level. She reached the 800 m semi-finals (recording a personal best of 2:03.83), and won a silver medal for India with Rajwinder Kaur, Chitra Soman, and Manjeet Kaur in the 4×400 m relay.

At Bangalore's Asian Grand Prix meeting in May of that year, Pramanik won the 800 m and improved her 400 m personal best to 52.46 seconds. A few months later, at the 2006 South Asian Games, she won 400 and 800 m gold medals and headed the relay team for a third gold. Pramanik was disappointed that she had not improved her time, and said that she expected more competition from the Sri Lankan athletes.

Selected to represent Asia at the 2006 IAAF World Cup, she finished seventh in the 800 m. Pramanik competed in her first Asian Games later that year, in the 400 m and the relay. She reached the individual final and finished fourth, two-hundredths of a second behind Japan's Asami Tanno. In the relay with Sathi Geetha, Chitra Soman and Manjeet Kaur, she won India's only athletics gold of the games.

=== Injuries ===
A foot injury caused Pramanik to miss much of the 2007 season. Returning to fitness by August, she began competing at a regional meet in Kolkata and recorded a 100-metre time of 11.07 seconds. Pramanik set her sights on winning at the 2008 Indian Inter-State Championships in order to qualify for the 2008 Summer Olympics. However, she missed the championships due to a hamstring injury.

In early 2010, Pramanik inaugurated the local Purulia Athletic Championship. On the way home from the meet, her vehicle collided with another and she received deep cuts to her face and knees. Although her condition was not serious, she had back pain and remained in hospital.

=== Doping ===
In a 2012 interview, Pramanik said that her coaches required her to have regular injections of testosterone to improve her performance.

== Sex controversy ==
In 2012, a rape allegation by a female friend of Pramanik led to medical tests to determine her gender. Initial private tests reportedly indicated that she was male. Pramanik disagreed with the results, and police ordered a separate government-led test as part of her trial. Results at the SSKM Government Hospital were inconclusive. The court then ordered a chromosome pattern test. In November of that year, further medical tests were reported indicating that Pramanik is a "male pseudo-hermaphrodite". The medical report also indicated that Pramanik is incapable of penetrative sex.

She said in an interview, "The girl who brought these allegations was not my partner and we were not in love. She used to live next door on rent with her lover and her five-year-old child. She had taken nude photographs of me and was threatening to make them public. She had been blackmailing me for some time. But to be accused of being male and raping her shocked me. I am not male. I have always been female. I look more male now because, as part of my training to compete in international athletics, I used to be regularly administered testosterone injections like other female participants. I was told that it was necessary to take these and I never questioned whether these were legal or not. I was focused on winning and did whatever I was asked to do by my trainers, who knew what was best for me. But after that, my voice became deeper and I grew more body hair." Pramanik said that she was manhandled, and was kept in a men's cell; she did not consent to any testing, and was drugged and unconscious for the examination. Her friend said that Avatar Singh, a power broker and husband of Bengalese athlete Jyotirmoyee Sikdar (a former CPM MP), was behind an attempt to frame Pramanik as part of a dispute about land awarded to her by the West Bengal government for her performance at the 2006 South Asian and Asian Games.

== In popular culture ==
Pinky – Ek Satyakatha (Pinky – A True Story), a 2014 Indian Marathi-language drama film directed by Sudhin Thakur and starring Sara Shravan, is based on Pramanik's life. It seeks to highlight the negative aspects of gender testing in sports. Rashmi Rocket, a 2021 Indian sports drama film about the issue of gender testing, was inspired by several athletes including Pramanik and Dutee Chand.

== Personal bests ==
Event	Time (m:s)	Venue	Date
400 m	52.46	Bangalore, India	22 May 2006
800 m	2:02.49	Chennai, India	5 November 2006
400 m (indoor)	53.89	Pattaya, Thailand	13 November 2005
800 m (indoor)	2:15.06	Tehran, Iran	6 February 2004
