= Athletics at the 2006 Asian Games – Women's 400 metres =

Women's 400 metres at the 2006 Asian Games
- Venue: Khalifa International Stadium
- Dates: 9–10 December 2006
- Competitors: 13 from 8 nations

Medalists
gold medal	Olga Tereshkova	Kazakhstan
silver medal	Manjeet Kaur	India
bronze medal	Asami Tanno	Japan

The women's 400 metres competition at the 2006 Asian Games in Doha, Qatar was held on 9 and 10 December 2006 at the Khalifa International Stadium.

== Schedule ==
All times are Arabia Standard Time (UTC+03:00)

Date	Time	Event
Saturday, 9 December 2006	09:20	1st round
Sunday, 10 December 2006	16:25	Final

== Records ==
Prior to this competition, the existing world, Asian and Games records were as follows.

World Record	Marita Koch (GDR)	47.60	Canberra, Australia	6 October 1985
Asian Record	Ma Yuqin (CHN)	49.81	Beijing, China	11 September 1993
Games Record	Damayanthi Dharsha (SRI)	51.13	Busan, South Korea	10 October 2002

== Results ==
Legend

- DNS — Did not start

=== 1st round ===
- Qualification: First 3 in each heat (Q) and the next 2 fastest (q) advance to the final.

==== Heat 1 ====
Rank	Athlete	Time	Notes
1	Olga Tereshkova (KAZ)	53.30	Q
2	Pinki Pramanik (IND)	53.90	Q
3	Tang Xiaoyin (CHN)	54.19	Q
4	Mayu Kida (JPN)	54.58	q
5	Menaka Wickramasinghe (SRI)	57.73	
6	Leong Ka Man (MAC)	1:03.28	
—	Olga Gerasimova (TJK)	DNS	

==== Heat 2 ====
Rank	Athlete	Time	Notes
1	Asami Tanno (JPN)	53.94	Q
2	Manjeet Kaur (IND)	53.95	Q
3	Marina Maslyonko (KAZ)	54.32	Q
4	Chandrika Subashini (SRI)	56.50	q
5	Jiang Xuanxuan (CHN)	57.16	
6	Maryam Tousi (IRI)	57.83	

=== Final ===
Rank	Athlete	Time	Notes
1st place, gold medalist(s)	Olga Tereshkova (KAZ)	51.86	
2nd place, silver medalist(s)	Manjeet Kaur (IND)	52.17	
3rd place, bronze medalist(s)	Asami Tanno (JPN)	53.04	
4	Pinki Pramanik (IND)	53.06	
5	Tang Xiaoyin (CHN)	53.66	
6	Marina Maslyonko (KAZ)	53.99	
7	Mayu Kida (JPN)	54.27	
8	Chandrika Subashini (SRI)	56.57	
