= 2002 Asian Junior Athletics Championships =

10th Asian Junior Championships
- Dates: 28–31 October
- Host city: Bangkok, Thailand
- Level: Junior (under-20)
- Events: 43

The 2002 Asian Junior Athletics Championships was the tenth edition of the international athletics competition for Asian under-20 athletes, organised by the Asian Athletics Association. It took place from 28 to 31 October in Bangkok, Thailand. A total of 43 events were contested, which were divided equally between male and female athletes aside from the men's 3000 metres steeplechase.

== Medal summary ==
=== Men ===
Event	Gold		Silver		Bronze	
100 metres	Liu Dapeng (CHN)	10.74	Suryo Agung Wibowo (INA)	10.81	Masaya Aikawa (JPN)	10.83
200 metres	Shinji Takahira (JPN)	21.03	Liu Haitao (CHN)	21.14	Huang Wei (CHN)	21.16
400 metres	Yuki Yamaguchi (JPN)	47.11	Manoi Pushpa Kumara (SRI)	47.38	Sudam Marandi (IND)	47.93
800 metres	Adam Abdou (QAT)	1:47.17	Sajjad Moradi (IRI)	1:48.30	Ghamanda Ram (IND)	1:48.37
1500 metres	Abdul Rahman Suleiman (QAT)	3:53.52	Abubaker Kamal (QAT)	3:53.58	Sajjad Moradi (IRI)	3:54.22
5000 metres	Yasuhiro Tago (JPN)	14:41.08	Tomoyuki Honda (JPN)	14:41.08	Yousef Abu Kwaik (PLE)	15:33.04
10,000 metres	Tomoyuki Honda (JPN)	30:07.06	Muresh Kumar Yadav (IND)	32:16.60	Amnuay Tongmit (THA)	33:54.00
110 metres hurdles	Wu Youjia (CHN)	14.18	Muhd Faiz Mohamad (MAS)	14.28	Jang Seung-Han (KOR)	14.51
400 metres hurdles	Tsuneaki Tanaka (JPN)	51.43	Takayuki Koike (JPN)	51.56	Patlavath Shankar (IND)	52.14
3000 metres steeplechase	Abubaker Kamal (QAT)	8:53.47 =CR	Shuji Yoshioka (JPN)	8:53.61	Mehdi Javanhamd (IRI)	9:16.80
4 × 100 m relay	Japan (JPN); Masaya Aikawa; Yasutaka Matsunaga; Shinji Takahira; Hiroyuki Noda	39.30 CR	Thailand (THA); Wachara Sondee; Samarn Yanphiboon; Nutdanee Sanoh; Siriroj Darasuriyong	40.08	Iran (IRI); Hossein Ghaemi; M. Abbaszadeh; Payman Rajabi; Mohammad Akefian	40.86
4 × 400 m relay	Japan (JPN); Hiroyuki Noda; Yuki Yamaguchi; Shinji Takahira; Yushi Nakata	3:07.51	India (IND); Patlavath Shankar; Karaka Appa Rao; A. Kubule; Sudam Marandi	3:10.06	Iran (IRI); Hasham Khazadi; Payman Rajabi; Mohammad Akefian; G. Pachmahaleh	3:10.95
10,000 metres walk	Fumihiro Kobayashi (JPN)	42:00.53 CR	Chen Guangdong (CHN)	44:11.50	Mabrouk Mohamed (QAT)	45:23.36
High jump	Zhu Wannan (CHN)	2.19 m	Park Jun-Hwan (KOR) Andrey Podurov (UZB)	2.15 m	Not awarded	
Pole vault	Leonid Andreev (UZB)	5.20 m =CR	Kang Chung-Keun (KOR)	5.10 m	Takuro Mori (JPN)	5.10 m
Long jump	Abdullah Al-Waleed (QAT)	7.82 m	Zhu Kai (CHN)	7.70 m	Chao Chih-chien (TPE)	7.70 m
Triple jump	Gu Junjie (CHN)	16.73 m CR	Li Yanxi (CHN)	16.57 m	Mohammad Hazzory (SYR)	16.17 m
Shot put	Khalid Habash Al-Suwaidi (QAT)	20.29 m CR	Ranvijay Singh (IND)	19.28 m	Amit Tyagi (IND)	18.61 m
Discus throw	Khalid Habash Al-Suwaidi (QAT)	63.17 m CR	Xu Yongyi (CHN)	61.04 m	Zhang Yuhao (CHN)	59.58 m
Hammer throw	Ali Al-Zinkawi (KUW)	74.93 m CR	Zhang Dapeng (CHN)	71.61 m	Mohamed Al-Kaabi (QAT)	70.32 m
Javelin throw	Jeong Sang-Jin (KOR)	75.36 m	Kazuki Yamamoto (JPN)	73.93 m	Chou Yi-Chen (TPE)	71.84 m
Decathlon	Hong Qingyanq (CHN)	7471 pts CR	Akira Kano (JPN)	7076 pts	Rifat Artikov (UZB)	6809 pts

=== Women ===
Event	Gold		Silver		Bronze	
100 metres	Zhu Yuanhong (CHN)	11.97	Nongnuch Sanrat (THA)	12.00	Leng Mei (CHN)	12.23
200 metres	Lao Yuqing (CHN)	24.20	He Ying (CHN)	24.33	Natsuko Nagashima (JPN)	24.63
400 metres	Sathi Geetha (IND)	54.30	Asami Tanno (JPN)	54.72	Bindu Rani (IND)	54.85
800 metres	Ji Siyu (CHN)	2:08.04	No Yoo-Yeon (KOR)	2:08.53	Anna Klyushkina (KGZ)	2:09.45
1500 metres	No Yoo-Yeon (KOR)	4:27.15	Ji Siyu (CHN)	4:28.32	An Un Suk (PRK)	4:29.29
3000 metres	Zhang Yuhong (CHN)	9:36.53	Ri Chung Sim (PRK)	9:39.20	Kim Hyon Hui (PRK)	9:43.05
10,000 metres	Zhang Yuhong (CHN)	34:44.33	Ri Chung Sim (PRK)	36:08.41	Kim Hyon Hui (PRK)	36:40.35
100 metres hurdles	Ji Fangqian (CHN)	13.85	Fumiko Kumagai (JPN)	13.97	Saori Kaneko (JPN)	14.17
400 metres hurdles	Xiao Hongfan (CHN)	59.28	Galina Pedan (KGZ)	60.52	Chisa Nishio (JPN)	60.66
4 × 100 m relay	China (CHN); Leng Mei; Zhu Yuanhong; Lao Yuqing; He Ying	45.53	Thailand (THA); Nongnuch Sanrat; Supapon Loulert; Sangwan Jaksunin; M. Mapa	45.61	Japan (JPN); Natsuko Nagashima; Kayoko Kurimoto; Fumiko Kumagai; Saori Kaneko	46.35
4 × 400 m relay	India (IND); Pinki Pramanik; Chitra Soman; Bindu Rani; Sathi Geetha	3:40.50	Kazakhstan (KAZ); Assem Ziadanova; Olga Tereshkova; Olga Tsurikova; Nadezhda Rudneva	3:42.44	Japan (JPN); Asami Tanno; Kaori Takemoto; Natsuko Nagashima; Chisa Nishio	3:44.48
10,000 metres walk	Natsuki Kimura (JPN)	49:03.38 CR	Yoko Oura (JPN)	49:08.08	Hu Ming (CHN)	49:19.90
High jump	Li Rong (CHN)	1.79 m	Yuko Watanabe (JPN)	1.76 m	Anna Ustinova (KAZ)	1.76 m
Pole vault	Wu Sha (CHN)	3.90 m	Jasmaniah Osman (MAS)	3.70 m	Hsu Hsueh-Chin (TPE)	3.40 m
Long jump	Wang Lina (CHN)	6.29 m	Bi Xiaohui (CHN)	6.26 m	Ruta Patkar (IND)	6.14 m
Triple jump	Yu Shaohua (CHN)	13.71 m	Niu Nana (CHN)	13.41 m	Tatyana Bocharova (KAZ)	13.32 m
Shot put	Zhang Xiaoyu (CHN)	18.18 m	Zhang Yuan (CHN)	16.40 m	Seema Antil (IND)	14.47 m
Discus throw	Xu Shaoyang (CHN)	62.54 m CR	Ma Xuejun (CHN)	57.56 m	Seema Antil (IND)	57.40 m
Hammer throw	Zhang Wenxiu (CHN)	66.10 m CR	Wei Xiaoyan (CHN)	54.04 m	Kang Na-Ru (KOR)	53.04 m
Javelin throw	Geng Aihua (CHN)	54.50 m	Suman Devi (IND)	52.33 m	Ayako Yamazaki (JPN)	48.89 m
Heptathlon	Yang Shaodan (CHN)	5211 pts	Mizuyo Kasahara (JPN)	5041 pts	Natalya Filatova (UZB)	4485 pts

== 2002 Medal Table ==
Rank	Nation	Gold	Silver	Bronze	Total
1	China (CHN)	22	13	4	39
2	Japan (JPN)	9	10	8	27
3	Qatar (QAT)	6	1	2	9
4	India (IND)	2	4	8	14
5	South Korea (KOR)	2	3	2	7
6	Uzbekistan (UZB)	1	1	2	4
7	Kuwait (KUW)	1	0	0	1
8	Thailand (THA)	0	3	1	4
9	North Korea (PRK)	0	2	3	5
10	Malaysia (MAS)	0	2	0	2
11	Iran (IRI)	0	1	4	5
12	Kazakhstan (KAZ)	0	1	2	3
13	Kyrgyzstan (KGZ)	0	1	1	2
14	Indonesia (INA)	0	1	0	1
14	Sri Lanka (SRI)	0	1	0	1
16	Chinese Taipei (TPE)	0	0	3	3
17	Palestine (PLE)	0	0	1	1
17	Syria (SYR)	0	0	1	1
Totals (18 entries)		43	44	42	129
