= Asami Chiba =

Japanese sprinter (born 1985)

Medal record

Women's athletics

Representing Japan

Asian Championships
Gold medal – first place	2009 Guangzhou	400 m
Silver medal – second place	2007 Amman	400 m
Silver medal – second place	2007 Amman	4 × 400 m relay
Bronze medal – third place	2005 Incheon	400 m
Bronze medal – third place	2005 Incheon	4 × 400 m relay
Bronze medal – third place	2009 Guangzhou	4 × 400 m relay

Asian Indoor Championships
Bronze medal – third place	2004 Tehran	200 m

Asian Games
Bronze medal – third place	2006 Doha	400 m

East Asian Games
Gold medal – first place	2005 Macau	400 m

Asami Chiba (千葉 麻美, Chiba Asami; born 25 September 1985), or Tanno, is a Japanese sprinter who specialises in the 400 metres. She is the Japanese record holder in the event, and has also broken the national record in the 4×400 metres relay on multiple occasions. She is a member of Natureal Athlete Club in Japan and is coached by Kazuhisa Kawamoto.

As a junior athlete, Tanno won two silver medals at the Asian Junior Athletics Championships, setting a national record in 2004, and she also reached the final of the World Junior Championships. She competed at her first World Championships the following year and won two bronze medals at the Asian Championships. In the 2006 and 2007 seasons, she won bronze at the 2006 Asian Games and two silver medals at the Asian Championships. She also helped set a new national relay record and became Japan's first ever female sprint semi-finalist at the 2007 World Championships. She was less successful at the 2008 Beijing Olympics and 2009 World Championships as she was eliminated in the heats at both events.

A five-time national champion in the 400 m, she has only lost once in the event at the Japanese championships, to Satomi Kubokura. She mainly competes on the Japanese athletics circuit, running at the Osaka Grand Prix, Shizuoka International and the Super Meet in Kawasaki.

== Career ==
=== National champion and records ===
A native of Yabuki, Fukushima, Asami Tanno won her first international medals at the 2002 Asian Junior Athletics Championships, taking the 400 m silver behind Sathi Geetha and a bronze with the Japanese relay team. After making significant improvements upon her 2003 performances, she came to prominence at the 2004 Asian Junior Athletics Championships in Ipoh. She set a Japanese record in the 400 m with 52.88 seconds, a time that is still the national junior record. She also ran in the 4×100 metres relay, winning her first international gold medal.

Further success came at scholastic level, as she set championship records to win the 200 m and 400 m at the Japanese Inter-Collegiate Championships. She won a bronze medal in the 200 metres at the Asian Indoor Athletics Championships and won the 400 m events at both the Japanese National Games (Kokutai) and the national championships that year. Also, she competed at her first World Junior Championships, reaching the final and finishing in sixth place.

The following year she broke the 400 m indoor record with 53.64 seconds in Tianjin and won the 800 metres at the National Games. At the national championships she came second in the 200 m to Sakie Nobuoka and she also improved her own 400 m Japanese outdoor record. After coming close to her record in the heats, she became a two time 400 m national champion with 51.93 seconds, knocking a second off her previous best. This was sufficient for qualification in the 2005 World Championships in Athletics, but Tanno did not progress beyond the 400 m preliminary rounds. She rebounded, however, at the Asian Championships, winning two bronze medals in the individual and relay 400 m events. Her good form continued as she finished fourth at the 2005 Summer Universiade and set a new best at the Seiko Super Track & Field Meet (Super Rikujyo). At the meeting she finished with 51.80 seconds and although this was some distance behind American Dee Dee Trotter (50.03) Tanno stated that she aspired to break 51 seconds in her career too. She ended the year with a 400 m gold medal at the 2005 East Asian Games.

In 2006, she won the Osaka Grand Prix in May with a season's best of 51.84 seconds. Tanno did not run at the national championships finals, missing out on a third consecutive win. She competed in the 2006 IAAF World Cup, forming part of the Asian women's 4×400 metres relay team, but ended up in last place. She finished the year with an appearance at the 2006 Asian Games, taking the bronze medal in the 400 m and finishing fourth in the relay.

=== 2007 Osaka Championships and Beijing Olympics ===
Returning to the Osaka GP, she set a national record of 3:30.53 in the 4×400 m relay with Mayu Kida, Satomi Kubokura and Makiko Yoshida, and also took second place behind Mary Wineberg in the individual race. The national championships acted as trials for the 2007 World Championships in Osaka, and Tanno won the 400 m and pushed Sakie Nobuoka to the line in the 200 m, narrowly finishing second. A month before the World Championships, she ran the 400 m at the Asian Championships, winning the silver medal behind Indian Chitra Soman. She won her second silver of the competition with the Japanese 4×400 m relay, beaten to the gold again by the Indian athletes.

Representing the host nation at the World Championships, she failed to reach the finals of the 400 m. However, she recorded a season's best of 51.81 seconds and succeeded in becoming the first ever Japanese woman to reach the semi-finals of a sprinting event at the World Championships. In the 4×400 m relay the Japanese team (Sayaka Aoki, Tanno, Kubokura and Kida) were eliminated in the heats, but they managed a new national record of 3:30.17, improving upon the mark Tanno had helped set earlier in the season.

She missed the 2008 Asian Indoor Championship in Doha and began the outdoor season with another national record, recording 51.75 seconds at the Shizuoka International in May. She was expected to improve further at the Osaka GP, but wet conditions slowed the athletes and she finished third with 52.55 seconds. At the national championships, which were also the trials for the 2008 Beijing Olympics, she beat hurdles specialist Kubokura to the title and was selected to represent Japan at the Olympics. At the Olympics in August, she recorded 52.60 seconds in the qualification rounds, which was not sufficient to progress. She returned to the track with the Japanese relay team. While their time of 3:30.52 was not far off the team's national record, it left them in eighth place at the heats stage.

=== 2009 World Championships and 2010 Asian Games ===
She opened her season at the Shizuoka International, winning in a modest 53.21 seconds. Tanno repeated her performance from the previous year in the Osaka GP, taking third behind foreign opposition – Australian Tamsyn Lewis and American Latosha Wallace. At the Japanese Trials for the World Championships, she beat Aoki to the national title, her fifth victory at the championships in six years. Tanno could not match her 2007 performance at the 2009 World Championships and she was eliminated in the 400 m heats with a sub-par 53.30 seconds. A Japanese team of Aoki, Tanno, Sato (née Kida) and Kubokura did not perform well in the 4×400 metres relay competition, finishing last in their heat with 3:34.46.

After the World Championships, she competed at the Super Meet in Kawasaki, beating off Barbara Petráhn and Maris Mägi to win the 400 m.

She was married in February 2010. She failed to defend her national title in 2010 after suffering injuries earlier in the season, leaving Chisato Tanaka to take the victory. She represented Asia at the 2010 IAAF Continental Cup, but finished last in the 400 m. She won the silver medal at the 2010 Asian Games, although the Japanese team missed out on a relay medal as they finished in fourth.

== Personal bests ==
Event	Time (sec)	Venue	Date
200 metres	23.75	Yokohama, Japan	10 June 2006
300 metres	38.53	Tokyo, Japan	2 September 2006
400 metres	51.75 NR	Fukuroi, Japan	3 May 2008
400 metres (indoor)	53.64 NR	Tianjin, PR China	1 March 2005

- All information taken from IAAF profile.

== Competition record ==
Year	Competition	Venue	Position	Event	Notes
Representing Japan
2002	Asian Junior Championships	Bangkok, Thailand	2nd	400 m	54.72
2002	Asian Junior Championships	Bangkok, Thailand	3rd	4×100 m relay	3:44.48
2004	Asian Junior Championships	Ipoh, Malaysia	2nd	400 m	52.88
2004	Asian Junior Championships	Ipoh, Malaysia	1st	4×100 m relay	46.01
2004	Asian Indoor Championships	Tehran, Iran	3rd	200 m	24.99
2004	World Junior Championships	Grosseto, Italy	6th	400m	53.34
2004	World Junior Championships	Grosseto, Italy	13th (h)	4×100m relay	45.80
2005	World Championships	Helsinki, Finland	30th (h)	400 m	52.80
2005	Universiade	İzmir, Turkey	4th	400 m	52.91
2005	Asian Championships	Incheon, South Korea	1st	400 m	52.69
2005	Asian Championships	Incheon, South Korea	2nd	4×400 m relay	3:36.64
2005	East Asian Games	Macau	3rd	400m	52.91
2005	East Asian Games	Macau	3rd	4x400m relay	3:33.54
2006	World Cup	Athens, Greece	9th	4×400 m relay	3:38.85
2006	Asian Games	Doha, Qatar	3rd	400 m	53.04
2006	Asian Games	Doha, Qatar	4th	4×400 m relay	3:35.08
2007	Asian Championships	Amman, Jordan	2nd	400 m	53.20
2007	Asian Championships	Amman, Jordan	2nd	4×400 m relay	3:33.82
2007	World Championships	Osaka, Japan	20th (sf)	400 m	51.81
2007	World Championships	Osaka, Japan	11th (h)	4×400 m relay	3:30.17 (NR)
2008	Olympic Games	Beijing, China	28th (h)	400 m	52.60
2008	Olympic Games	Beijing, China	15th (h)	4×400 m relay	3:30.52
2009	World Championships	Berlin, Germany	27th (h)	400 m	53.30
2009	World Championships	Berlin, Germany	14th (h)	4×400 m relay	3:34.46
2009	Asian Championships	Guangzhou, China	1st	400 m	53.32
2009	Asian Championships	Guangzhou, China	3rd	4×400 m relay	3:31.95
2010	Continental Cup	Split, Croatia	8th	400 m	53.38
2010	Asian Games	Guangzhou, China	2nd	400 m	52.68
2010	Asian Games	Guangzhou, China	4th	4×400 m relay	3:31.81
2013	Asian Championships	Pune, India	3rd	4×400 m relay	3:35.72
2014	Asian Games	Incheon, South Korea	2nd	4×400 m relay	3:30.80
2015	Asian Championships	Wuhan, China	7th	400 m	54.71
2015	Asian Championships	Wuhan, China	4th	4×400 m relay	3:35.93
2015	World Championships	Beijing, China	13th (h)	4×400 m relay	3:28.91

- Japanese national 400 m champion: 2004, 2005, 2007, 2008, 2009
