= Athletics at the 2010 Asian Games – Women's 4 × 400 metres relay =

Women's 4 × 400 metres relay at the 2010 Asian Games
- Venue: Aoti Main Stadium
- Dates: 26 November 2010
- Competitors: 24 from 6 nations

Medalists
gold medal	India; Manjeet Kaur, Sini Jose, Ashwini Akkunji, Mandeep Kaur
silver medal	Kazakhstan; Marina Maslyonko, Viktoriya Yalovtseva, Margarita Matsko, Olga Tereshkova
bronze medal	China; Zheng Zhihui, Tang Xiaoyin, Chen Lin, Chen Jingwen

The women's 4 × 400 metres relay event at the 2010 Asian Games was held at the Aoti Main Stadium, Guangzhou, China on 26 November.

== Schedule ==
All times are China Standard Time (UTC+08:00)

Date	Time	Event
Friday, 26 November 2010	19:20	Final

== Records ==
Prior to this competition, the existing world, Asian and Games records were as follows.

World Record	Soviet Union	3:15.17	Seoul, South Korea	1 October 1988
Asian Record	China	3:24.28	Beijing, China	13 September 1993
Games Record	China	3:29.11	Hiroshima, Japan	16 October 1994

== Results ==
Rank	Team	Time	Notes
1st place, gold medalist(s)	India (IND); Manjeet Kaur; Sini Jose; Ashwini Akkunji; Mandeep Kaur	3:29.02	GR
2nd place, silver medalist(s)	Kazakhstan (KAZ); Marina Maslyonko; Viktoriya Yalovtseva; Margarita Matsko; Olga Tereshkova	3:30.03	
3rd place, bronze medalist(s)	China (CHN); Zheng Zhihui; Tang Xiaoyin; Chen Lin; Chen Jingwen	3:30.89	
4	Japan (JPN); Sayaka Aoki; Asami Chiba; Satomi Kubokura; Chisato Tanaka	3:31.81	
5	Iraq (IRQ); Dana Hussein; Inam Khazaal; Alaa Hikmat; Gulustan Mahmood	3:45.44	
6	Myanmar (MYA); Lai Lai Win; Aye Aye Than; Yin Yin Khine; Kay Khine Lwin	3:55.24	
