= 2007 Asian Athletics Championships – Women's 400 metres =

The women's 400 metres event at the 2007 Asian Athletics Championships was held in Amman, Jordan on July 26–27.

== Medalists ==
Gold	Silver	Bronze
Chitra Soman; India	Asami Tanno; Japan	Menaka Wickramasinghe; Sri Lanka

== Results ==
=== Heats ===
Rank	Heat	Name	Nationality	Time	Notes
1	2	Chitra Soman	India	53.60	Q
2	2	Asami Tanno	Japan	53.67	Q
3	2	Menaka Wickramasinghe	Sri Lanka	54.19	Q
4	1	Zhai Lin	China	55.33	Q
5	1	Manjit Kaur	India	55.70	Q
6	1	Natsumi Watanabe	Japan	56.11	Q
7	2	Marina Maslenko	Kazakhstan	56.95	q
8	1	Maryam Tousi	Iran	57.50	q
9	1	Bushra Parveen	Pakistan	1:02.9	
	2	Anna Gavriushenko	Kazakhstan	DNF	

=== Final ===
Rank	Lane	Name	Nationality	Time	Notes
1st place, gold medalist(s)	3	Chitra Soman	India	53.03	
2nd place, silver medalist(s)	6	Asami Tanno	Japan	53.20	
3rd place, bronze medalist(s)	2	Menaka Wickramasinghe	Sri Lanka	54.11	
4	4	Zhai Lin	China	54.17	
5	5	Manjit Kaur	India	54.40	
6	1	Marina Maslenko	Kazakhstan	54.76	
7	7	Natsumi Watanabe	Japan	56.66	
8	8	Maryam Tousi	Iran	1:00.11	
