= Athletics at the 2006 Asian Games – Women's 4 × 400 metres relay =

Athletics event

Women's 4 × 400 metres relay at the 2006 Asian Games
- Venue: Khalifa International Stadium
- Dates: 12 December 2006
- Competitors: 20 from 5 nations

Medalists
gold medal	India; Sathi Geetha, Pinki Pramanik, Chitra Soman, Manjeet Kaur
silver medal	Kazakhstan; Marina Maslyonko, Viktoriya Yalovtseva, Tatyana Azarova, Olga Tereshkova
bronze medal	China; Han Ling, Huang Xiaoxiao, Tang Xiaoyin, Li Xueji

The women's 4 × 400 metres relay competition at the 2006 Asian Games in Doha, Qatar was held on 12 December 2006 at the Khalifa International Stadium.

== Schedule ==
All times are Arabia Standard Time (UTC+03:00)

Date	Time	Event
Tuesday, 12 December 2006	18:25	Final

== Records ==
Prior to this competition, the existing world, Asian and Games records were as follows.

World Record	Soviet Union	3:15.17	Seoul, South Korea	1 October 1988
Asian Record	China	3:24.28	Beijing, China	13 September 1993
Games Record	China	3:29.11	Hiroshima, Japan	16 October 1994

== Results ==
Rank	Team	Time	Notes
1st place, gold medalist(s)	India (IND); Sathi Geetha; Pinki Pramanik; Chitra Soman; Manjeet Kaur	3:32.95	
2nd place, silver medalist(s)	Kazakhstan (KAZ); Marina Maslyonko; Viktoriya Yalovtseva; Tatyana Azarova; Olga Tereshkova	3:33.86	
3rd place, bronze medalist(s)	China (CHN); Han Ling; Huang Xiaoxiao; Tang Xiaoyin; Li Xueji	3:33.92	
4	Japan (JPN); Mayu Kida; Satomi Kubokura; Masako Takeuchi; Asami Tanno	3:35.08	
5	Sri Lanka (SRI); Lasanthi Deepika; P. S. M. de Soysa; S. V. A. Kusumawathi; Chandrika Subashini	3:49.04	
