= 2009 Asian Athletics Championships – Women's 400 metres =

Sporting Event

The women's 400 metres event at the 2009 Asian Athletics Championships was held at the Guangdong Olympic Stadium on November 10–11.

== Medalists ==
Gold	Silver	Bronze
Asami Tanno; Japan	Chen Lin; China	Manjeet Kaur; India

== Results ==
=== Heats ===
Rank	Heat	Name	Nationality	Time	Notes
1	1	Asami Tanno	Japan	52.78	Q
2	1	Mandeep Kaur	India	53.19	Q
3	1	Tang Xiaoyin	China	53.50	Q
4	1	Marina Maslyonko	Kazakhstan	53.66	q
5	2	Chen Lin	China	53.68	Q
6	2	Manjeet Kaur	India	53.87	Q
7	2	Mayu Sato	Japan	54.49	Q
8	1	Treewadee Yongphan	Thailand	55.11	q, PB
9	1	Chandrika Subashini Rasnayake	Sri Lanka	55.32	
10	2	Saowalee Kaechuay	Thailand	56.09	SB
11	2	Maryam Tousi	Iran	57.01	
12	1	Nguyen Thi Thuy	Vietnam	57.77	
13	2	Esso Gulstan	Iraq	58.59	
14	1	Leong Ka Man	Macau	59.40	
15	2	Pramila Rijal	Nepal	1:00.47	
	2	Olga Tereshkova	Kazakhstan	DNS	

=== Final ===
Rank	Lane	Name	Nationality	Time	Notes
1st place, gold medalist(s)	6	Asami Tanno	Japan	53.32	
2nd place, silver medalist(s)	4	Chen Lin	China	53.55	
3rd place, bronze medalist(s)	3	Manjeet Kaur	India	53.66	
4	5	Mandeep Kaur	India	53.76	
5	2	Marina Maslyonko	Kazakhstan	53.78	
6	7	Tang Xiaoyin	China	54.10	
7	8	Mayu Sato	Japan	55.52	
8	1	Treewadee Yongphan	Thailand	55.56	
