= Xiaoyan =

Xiaoyan or Hsiao-yen (Chinese: 晓燕) or Chinese: 小燕 is a Chinese-language feminine given name. It may refer to:

- Cheng Xiaoyan (born 1975), Chinese shot putter
- Gao Xiaoyan (born 1957), Chinese army major general
- Liao Xiaoyan (born 1987), Chinese hammer thrower
- Pai Hsiao-yen (1980–1997), Taiwanese murder victim
- Wang Xiaoyan (born 1970), Chinese Olympic softball player
- Yang Xiaoyan (born 1930), Chinese name of bridge player Katherine Wei-Sender
- Yang Xiaoyan (born 1980), Chinese Olympic sailor
- Zhou Xiaoyan (1917–2016), Chinese opera singer
- Zhuang Xiaoyan (born 1969), Chinese judoka and Olympic champion
- Xiao Yan (actress) (born 1997) Chinese actress

== See also ==
- Xiaoyan, Anhua, a town in Hunan Province
- Yang Xiaoyan (disambiguation)
