= Miho Shingu =

Japanese sprinter

Personal information
- Nationality: Japanese
- Born: 29 November 1991 (age 34) Hiroshima, Japan
- Education: Fukushima University Graduate Schools
- Height: 1.62 m (5 ft 4 in)
- Weight: 48 kg (106 lb)

Sport
- Country: Japan
- Sport: Track and field
- Event(s): 400 metres 800 metres
- Team: Fresco

Achievements and titles
- Personal best(s): 400 m: 53.66 (2012); 800 m: 2:05.47 (2012)
Medal record
Women's athletics
Representing Japan
Asian Championships
Gold medal – first place	2011 Kobe	4×400 m relay
East Asian Games
Silver medal – second place	2009 Hong Kong	4×400 m relay
Silver medal – second place	2013 Tianjin	4×400 m relay
Bronze medal – third place	2009 Hong Kong	400 m

Miho Shingu (新宮 美歩, Shingū Miho; born 29 November 1991 in Hiroshima) is a Japanese track and field athlete who specialises in the 400 metres and 800 metres. She was selected for the 4 × 400 metres relay member at the 2009 World Championships in Berlin at the age of 17, but did not compete. She won a gold medal in the 4 × 400 metres relay at the 2011 Asian Championships in Kobe with teammates Sayaka Aoki, Chisato Tanaka and Satomi Kubokura. She was also the 2011 Japanese champion in the 400 metres and a two-time Japanese champion in the 4 × 400 metres relay.

== Personal bests ==
Event	Time	Competition	Venue	Date
400 m	53.66	Japanese Championships	Osaka, Japan	8 June 2012
800 m	2:05.47	Mikio Oda Memorial	Hiroshima, Japan	28 April 2012

== International competition ==
Year	Competition	Venue	Position	Event	Time	Notes
Representing Japan
2009	East Asian Games	Hong Kong, China	3rd	400 m	55.37	
2009	East Asian Games	Hong Kong, China	2nd	4×400 m relay	3:42.18 (relay leg: 1st)	
2010	World Junior Championships	Moncton, Canada	22nd (sf)	400 m	55.66	
2010	World Junior Championships	Moncton, Canada	14th (h)	4×400 m relay	3:50.65 (relay leg: 1st)	SB
2011	Asian Championships	Kobe, Japan	5th	400 m	54.28	
2011	Asian Championships	Kobe, Japan	1st	4×400 m relay	3:35.00 (relay leg: 4th)	
2013	East Asian Games	Tianjin, China	4th	400 m	56.62	
2013	East Asian Games	Tianjin, China	2nd	4×400 m relay	3:40.55 (relay leg: 4th)	

== National titles ==
Year	Competition	Venue	Event	Time	Notes
Representing Higashiosaka College Keiai high school
2008	National High School Championships	Kumagaya, Saitama	4×400 m relay	3:41.31 (relay leg: 2nd)	HSR, GR
2008	National Youth Championships	Tottori, Tottori	400 m	55.04	GR, PB
2009	National High School Championships	Nara, Nara	400 m	54.21	
2009	National High School Championships	Nara, Nara	4×400 m relay	3:37.86 (relay leg: 2nd)	HSR, GR
2009	National Sports Festival	Niigata, Niigata	400 m (Girls A)	54.59	
2009	National Junior Championships	Kōfu, Yamanashi	400 m	55.31	
Representing Higashiosaka College
2011	National Championships	Kumagaya, Saitama	400 m	54.16	
2011	National University Championships	Kumamoto, Kumamoto	4×400 m relay	3:37.87 (relay leg: 2nd)	
2011	National Championships	Yokohama, Kanagawa	4×400 m relay	3:37.42 (relay leg: 2nd)	
2012	National University Individual Championships	Hiratsuka, kanagawa	400 m	54.83	
2012	National University Championships	Shinjuku, Tokyo	4×400 m relay	3:38.21 (relay leg: 3rd)	
Representing Toho Bank
2017	National Corporate Championships	Osaka, Osaka	4×400 m relay	45.61 (relay leg: 4th)	
2017	National Championships	Yokohama, Kanagawa	4×400 m relay	3:36.00 (relay leg: 3rd)	
