= Mayu Kida =

Japanese sprinter

Personal information
- Nationality: Japan
- Born: 14 September 1982 (age 43) Obihiro, Hokkaidō, Japan
- Education: Fukushima University
- Height: 1.63 m (5 ft 4 in)
- Weight: 53 kg (117 lb)

Sport
- Sport: Athletics
- Event: 4 × 400 metres relay
- Club: Natureal (JPN)
- Coached by: Kazuhisa Kawamoto

Achievements and titles
- Personal best: 400 m: 53.05 s (2008)
Medal record
Women's athletics
Representing Japan
Asian Championships
Silver medal – second place	2002 Colombo	4×400 m relay
Bronze medal – third place	2005 Incheon	4×400 m relay
Bronze medal – third place	2009 Guangzhou	4×400 m relay

Mayu Kida (木田 真有, Kida Mayu; born September 14, 1982 in Obihiro, Hokkaidō) is a retired Japanese sprinter, who specialized in the 400 metres. Kida competed for the women's 4 × 400 m relay at the 2008 Summer Olympics in Beijing, along with her teammates Sayaka Aoki, Satomi Kubokura, and Asami Tanno. She ran on the third leg of the first heat, with an individual-split time of 52.72 seconds. Kida and her team finished the relay in last place for a seasonal best time of 3:30.52, failing to advance into the final.

== International competition ==
Year	Competition	Venue	Position	Event	Time	Notes
Representing Japan
1999	World Youth Championships	Bydgoszcz, Poland	18th (h)	400 m	56.28	
1999	World Youth Championships	Bydgoszcz, Poland	4th	Medley relay	2:11.72 (relay leg: 4th)	NYB
2002	Asian Championships	Colombo, Sri Lanka	5th	400 m	54.69	
2002	Asian Championships	Colombo, Sri Lanka	2nd	4×400 m relay	3:38.29 (relay leg: 2nd)	
2002	Asian Games	Busan, South Korea	6th	400 m	54.13	
2002	Asian Games	Busan, South Korea	4th	4×400 m relay	3:33.23 (relay leg: 3rd)	
2003	Asian Championships	Manila, Philippines	7th	400 m	54.75	
2003	Asian Championships	Manila, Philippines	5th	4×400 m relay	3:38.09 (relay leg: 2nd)	
2004	Asian Indoor Championships	Tehran, Iran	5th	200 m	25.81	
2004	Asian Indoor Championships	Tehran, Iran	5th	400 m	56.20	
2005	Asian Championships	Incheon, South Korea	9th (h)	400 m	55.30	
2005	Asian Championships	Incheon, South Korea	3rd	4×400 m relay	3:33.54 (relay leg: 3rd)	
2005	East Asian Games	Macau, China	4th	400 m	55.00	
2006	Asian Games	Doha, Qatar	7th	400 m	54.27	
2006	Asian Games	Doha, Qatar	4th	4×400 m relay	3:35.08 (relay leg: 1st)	
2007	World Championships	Osaka, Japan	11th (h)	4×400 m relay	3:30.17 (relay leg: 4th)	NR
2008	Olympics	Beijing, China	13th (h)	4×400 m relay	3:30.52 (relay leg: 3rd)	SB
2009	World Championships	Berlin, Germany	12th (h)	4×400 m relay	3:34.46 (relay leg: 3rd)	
2009	Asian Championships	Guangzhou, China	7th	400 m	55.52	
2009	Asian Championships	Guangzhou, China	3rd	4×400 m relay	3:31.95 (relay leg: 3rd)	SB
