= Track and field at the 2011 Military World Games – Women's 400 metres =

The women's 400 metres event at the 2011 Military World Games was held on 21 and 22 July at the Estádio Olímpico João Havelange.

== Records ==
Prior to this competition, the existing world and CISM record were as follows:

World Record	Marita Koch (GDR)	47.60	Canberra, Australia	6 October 1985
CISM World Record				

== Schedule ==
Date	Time	Round
21 July 2011		Semifinals
22 July 2011	11:30	Final

== Medalists ==
Gold	Silver	Bronze
Geisa Coutinho; Brazil	Olga Tereshkova; Kazakhstan	Jailma de Lima; Brazil

== Results ==
=== Final ===
Rank	Lane	Name	Nationality	Time	Notes
1st place, gold medalist(s)	3	Geisa Coutinho	Brazil	51.08	CR
2nd place, silver medalist(s)	7	Olga Tereshkova	Kazakhstan	51.27	
3rd place, bronze medalist(s)	5	Jailma de Lima	Brazil	51.77	
4	1	Libania Grenot	Italy	52.43	
5	4	Rmcs Rasnayake	Sri Lanka	52.52	
6	2	Sylvie Zimbere	Cameroon	54.26	
7	6	Yolanda Osana	Dominican Republic	54.86	
	8	Hayat Lambarki	Morocco	DNF	
