= 2011 Asian Athletics Championships – Women's 400 metres =

The women's 400 metres at the 2011 Asian Athletics Championships was held at the Kobe Universiade Memorial Stadium on 7 and 8 July.

The original gold and silver medallists, Kazakhstan's Olga Tereshkova and Iraq's Gulustan Ieso, were later disqualified after testing positive for testosterone and methylhexaneamine, respectively. Initial bronze medallist Chen Jingwen of China was elevated to the gold medal position, while fourth and fifth placed runners Chandrika Subashini and Chisato Tanaka moved into the minor medal positions.

== Medalists ==
| Gold | Chen Jingwen; China |
| Silver | Chandrika Subashini; Sri Lanka |
| Bronze | Chisato Tanaka; Japan |

== Records ==
Standing records prior to the 2010 European Athletics Championships
| World record | Marita Koch (GDR) | 47.60 | Canberra, Australia | 6 October 1985 |
| Asian record | Ma Yuqin (CHN) | 49.81 | Beijing, China | 11 September 1993 |
| Championship record | Damayanthi Dharsha (SRI) | 51.05 | Jakarta, Indonesia | 2000 |
| World Leading | Allyson Felix (USA) | 49.81 | Rome, Italy | 26 May 2011 |
| Asian Leading | Chandrika Subashini (SRI) | 52.66 | Kingston, Jamaica | 23 June 2011 |

== Schedule ==
| Date | Time | Round |
|---|---|---|
| 7 July 2011 | 11:00 | Round 1 |
| 8 July 2011 | 18:40 | Final |

== Results ==
=== Round 1 ===
First 3 in each heat (Q) and 2 best performers (q) advance to the finals.

| Rank | Heat | Name | Nationality | Time | Notes |
|---|---|---|---|---|---|
| 1 | 2 | Chandrika Subashini | Sri Lanka | 54.05 | Q |
| 2 | 1 | Chen Jingwen | China | 54.06 | Q |
| 3 | 1 | Chisato Tanaka | Japan | 54.16 | Q |
| 4 | 1 | Miho Shingu | Japan | 54.36 | Q |
| 5 | 2 | Sayaka Aoki | Japan | 54.46 | q |
| 6 | 1 | Alaa Al-Qaysi | Iraq | 54.68 | q |
| 7 | 2 | Yujin Woo | South Korea | 55.78 | |
| 8 | 1 | Leong Ka Man | Macau | 1:00.04 | |
| | 2 | ~~Olga Tereshkova~~ | Kazakhstan | ~~53.53~~ | Q, DQ |
| | 2 | ~~Gulustan Ieso~~ | Iraq | ~~53.81~~ | Q, DQ |
| | 1 | Marina Maslyonko | Kazakhstan | DNF | |

=== Final ===
| Rank | Lane | Name | Nationality | Time | Notes |
|---|---|---|---|---|---|
| 1st place, gold medalist(s) | 7 | Chen Jingwen | China | 52.89 | |
| 2nd place, silver medalist(s) | 9 | Chandrika Subashini | Sri Lanka | 53.35 | |
| 3rd place, bronze medalist(s) | 4 | Chisato Tanaka | Japan | 54.08 | |
| 4 | 2 | Sayaka Aoki | Japan | 54.15 | |
| 5 | 8 | Miho Shingu | Japan | 54.28 | |
| 6 | 3 | Alaa Al-Qaysi | Iraq | 54.85 | |
| | 5 | ~~Olga Tereshkova~~ | Kazakhstan | ~~52.37~~ | DQ |
| | 6 | ~~Gulustan Ieso~~ | Iraq | ~~52.80~~ | DQ |
