= 2009 Asian Athletics Championships – Women's 4 × 400 metres relay =

The women's 4 × 400 metres relay event at the 2009 Asian Athletics Championships was held at the Guangdong Olympic Stadium on November 14.

== Results ==
Rank	Team	Name	Time	Notes
1st place, gold medalist(s)	China	Chen Yanmei, Tang Xiaoyin, Chen Jingwen, Chen Lin	3:31.08	
2nd place, silver medalist(s)	India	Mandeep Kaur, Sini Jose, Chitra Soman, Manjeet Kaur	3:31.62	
3rd place, bronze medalist(s)	Japan	Satomi Kubokura, Mayumi Watanabe, Mayu Sato, Asami Tanno	3:31.95	SB
4	Kazakhstan	Anna Gavryushenko, Viktoriya Yalovtseva, Margarita Matsko, Marina Maslyonko	3:36.54	
5	Thailand	Saowalee Kaechuay, Amornrat Winatho, Karat Srimuang, Treewadee Yongphan	3:38.73	SB
