= Athletics at the 2014 Asian Games – Women's 400 metres hurdles =

Women's 400 metres hurdles at the 2014 Asian Games
- Venue: Incheon Asiad Main Stadium
- Dates: 30 September – 1 October 2014
- Competitors: 9 from 7 nations

Medalists
| gold medal | Kemi Adekoya | Bahrain |
| silver medal | Satomi Kubokura | Japan |
| bronze medal | Xiao Xia | China |

The women's 400 metres hurdles event at the 2014 Asian Games was held at the Incheon Asiad Main Stadium, Incheon, South Korea on 30 September – 1 October.

== Schedule ==
All times are Korea Standard Time (UTC+09:00)

| Date | Time | Event |
|---|---|---|
| Tuesday, 30 September 2014 | 10:25 | Round 1 |
| Wednesday, 1 October 2014 | 20:25 | Final |

== Records ==
Prior to this competition, the existing world, Asian and Games records were as follows.

| World Record | Yuliya Pechonkina (RUS) | 52.34 | Tula, Russia | 8 August 2003 |
| Asian Record | Han Qing (CHN); Song Yinglan (CHN) | 53.96 | Beijing, China; Guangzhou, China | 9 September 1993; 22 November 2001 |
| Games Record | Leng Xueyan (CHN) | 55.26 | Hiroshima, Japan | 14 October 1994 |

== Results ==
=== Round 1 ===
- Qualification: First 3 in each heat (Q) and the next 2 fastest (q) advance to the final.

==== Heat 1 ====
| Rank | Athlete | Time | Notes |
|---|---|---|---|
| 1 | Kemi Adekoya (BRN) | 55.09 | Q, GR |
| 2 | Ashwini Akkunji (IND) | 57.67 | Q |
| 3 | Cai Minjia (CHN) | 59.22 | Q |
| 4 | Natalya Asanova (UZB) | 59.73 | q |
| 5 | Jo Eun-ju (KOR) | 59.93 | q |

==== Heat 2 ====
| Rank | Athlete | Time | Notes |
|---|---|---|---|
| 1 | Xiao Xia (CHN) | 58.13 | Q |
| 2 | Satomi Kubokura (JPN) | 58.46 | Q |
| 3 | Marina Zaiko (KAZ) | 59.18 | Q |
| 4 | Son Kyeong-mi (KOR) | 1:01.01 | |

=== Final ===
| Rank | Athlete | Time | Notes |
|---|---|---|---|
| 1st place, gold medalist(s) | Kemi Adekoya (BRN) | 55.77 | |
| 2nd place, silver medalist(s) | Satomi Kubokura (JPN) | 56.21 | |
| 3rd place, bronze medalist(s) | Xiao Xia (CHN) | 56.59 | |
| 4 | Ashwini Akkunji (IND) | 57.52 | |
| 5 | Marina Zaiko (KAZ) | 58.55 | |
| 6 | Cai Minjia (CHN) | 59.78 | |
| 7 | Jo Eun-ju (KOR) | 59.89 | |
| 8 | Natalya Asanova (UZB) | 1:00.42 | |
