= 2005 Asian Athletics Championships – Women's 4 × 400 metres relay =

The women's 4 × 400 metres relay event at the 2005 Asian Athletics Championships was held in Incheon, South Korea on September 4.

== Results ==
Rank	Team	Name	Time	Notes
1st place, gold medalist(s)	India	Rajwinder Kaur, Sathi Geetha, Chitra Soman, Manjeet Kaur	3:30.93	
2nd place, silver medalist(s)	Kazakhstan	Natalya Alimzhanova, Anna Gavriushenko, Tatyana Khadjimuratova, Olga Tereshkova	3:32.61	
3rd place, bronze medalist(s)	Japan	Satomi Kubokura, Asami Chiba, Mayu Sato, Makiko Yoshida	3:33.54	
4	China	Huang Xiaoxiao, Xie Qing, Tang Xiaoyin, Zhong Shaoting	3:37.11	
5	Sri Lanka	P. S. M. De Soysa, Lasanthi Deepika, S. V. A. Kusumawathi, Menike Wickramasinghe	3:42.60	
6	Iraq	Dana Abdulrazak, Rasha Abed Yaseen, Angham Jabbar, Hikmat Alaa Jassem	3:58.01	
