= 2011 Asian Athletics Championships – Women's 4 × 400 metres relay =

The women's 4 × 400 metres relay at the 2011 Asian Athletics Championships was held at the Kobe Universiade Memorial Stadium on 10 July.

The Kazakhstan and Iraq 4 × 400 m relay quartets (second and third initially) were later disqualified after Kazakhstan's Olga Tereshkova and Iraq's Gulustan Ieso tested positive for testosterone and methylhexaneamine, respectively. The Indian team were promoted to silver medallists and the bronze was vacated as only four teams participated.

== Results ==
Rank	Team	Name	Time	Notes
1st place, gold medalist(s)	Japan	Sayaka Aoki, Chisato Tanaka, Satomi Kubokura, Miho Shingu	3:35.00	
2nd place, silver medalist(s)	India	Mrudula Korada, Jhuma Khatun, Jaisha Orchatteri Puthiya, Tintu Luka	3:44.17	
—	Kazakhstan	Tatyana Khadjimuradova, Margarita Matsko, Alexandra Kuzina, Olga Tereshkova	3:36.61	DQ
—	Iraq	Alaa Al-Qaysi, Inam Al-Sudani, Gulustan Ieso, Danah Abdulrazzaq	3:41.91	DQ
