= 2007 Asian Athletics Championships – Women's 4 × 400 metres relay =

The women's 4 × 400 metres relay event at the 2007 Asian Athletics Championships was held in Amman, Jordan on July 29.

== Results ==
Rank	Team	Name	Time	Notes
1st place, gold medalist(s)	India	Mandeep Kaur, Manjit Kaur, Sini Jose, Chitra K. Soman	3:33.39	
2nd place, silver medalist(s)	Japan	Sayaka Aoki, Satomi Kubokura, Natsumi Watanabe, Asami Tanno	3:33.82	
3rd place, bronze medalist(s)	Kazakhstan	Tatyana Khajimuradova, Margarita Matsko, Anna Gavriushenko, Marina Maslenko	3:50.81	
4	Jordan	Abeer Al-Hiyari, Rania Shoukri Al-Qebali, Bara'h Marwan, Bayan Isam	4:21.61	
