= 2004 World Junior Championships in Athletics – Women's 400 metres =

The women's 400 metres event at the 2004 World Junior Championships in Athletics was held in Grosseto, Italy, at Stadio Olimpico Carlo Zecchini on 13, 14 and 15 July.

== Medalists ==
Gold	Natasha Hastings; United States
Silver	Sonita Sutherland; Jamaica
Bronze	Ashlee Kidd; United States

== Results ==
=== Final ===
15 July

Rank	Name	Nationality	Time	Notes
1st place, gold medalist(s)	Natasha Hastings	United States	52.04	
2nd place, silver medalist(s)	Sonita Sutherland	Jamaica	52.41	
3rd place, bronze medalist(s)	Ashlee Kidd	United States	52.45	
4	Tang Xiaoyin	China	52.87	
5	Olga Soldatova	Russia	52.99	
6	Asami Tanno	Japan	53.34	
7	Annemarie Schulte	Netherlands	53.67	
8	Liliya Pilyuhina	Ukraine	53.82	

=== Semifinals ===
14 July

==== Semifinal 1 ====
Rank	Name	Nationality	Time	Notes
1	Olga Soldatova	Russia	53.56	Q
2	Tang Xiaoyin	China	53.61	Q
3	Annemarie Schulte	Netherlands	53.93	Q
4	Sonita Sutherland	Jamaica	54.19	Q
5	Muna Jabir Adam	Sudan	54.49	
6	Amanda Kotze	South Africa	56.08	
7	Kineke Alexander	Saint Vincent and the Grenadines	56.42	
8	Abigail David	Trinidad and Tobago	65.15	

==== Semifinal 2 ====
Rank	Name	Nationality	Time	Notes
1	Natasha Hastings	United States	53.50	Q
2	Asami Tanno	Japan	53.83	Q
3	Ashlee Kidd	United States	53.93	Q
4	Liliya Pilyuhina	Ukraine	54.04	Q
5	Anja Pollmächer	Germany	54.24	
6	Jaimee-Lee Hoebergen	Australia	54.59	
7	Özge Gürler	Turkey	55.50	
8	Monique Williams	New Zealand	56.13	

=== Heats ===
13 July

==== Heat 1 ====
Rank	Name	Nationality	Time	Notes
1	Natasha Hastings	United States	52.61	Q
2	Asami Tanno	Japan	53.37	Q
3	Jaimee-Lee Hoebergen	Australia	53.48	Q
4	Amanda Kotze	South Africa	54.32	q
5	Antonina Krivoshapka	Russia	55.05	
6	Pınar Saka	Turkey	55.50	
7	Angela Makaha	Zimbabwe	55.88	
8	Wu Shanshan	China	56.31	

==== Heat 2 ====
Rank	Name	Nationality	Time	Notes
1	Ashlee Kidd	United States	53.56	Q
2	Annemarie Schulte	Netherlands	53.67	Q
3	Kineke Alexander	Saint Vincent and the Grenadines	54.00	Q
4	Emma Björkman	Sweden	54.41	
5	Gabriela Medina	Mexico	55.95	
6	Maria Spacca	Italy	56.50	
7	Mounira Al-Saleh	Syria	57.10	

==== Heat 3 ====
Rank	Name	Nationality	Time	Notes
1	Sonita Sutherland	Jamaica	53.52	Q
2	Liliya Pilyuhina	Ukraine	54.05	Q
3	Monique Williams	New Zealand	54.85	Q
4	Maris Mägi	Estonia	54.93	
5	Carline Muir	Canada	55.15	
6	Jacqueline Davies	Australia	55.76	

==== Heat 4 ====
Rank	Name	Nationality	Time	Notes
1	Abigail David	Trinidad and Tobago	53.48	Q
2	Olga Soldatova	Russia	53.54	Q
3	Tang Xiaoyin	China	53.74	Q
4	Anja Pollmächer	Germany	53.78	q
5	Muna Jabir Adam	Sudan	54.25	q
6	Özge Gürler	Turkey	54.41	q
7	Gemma Nicol	United Kingdom	54.77	
8	Liga Zauna	Latvia	58.21	

== Participation ==
According to an unofficial count, 29 athletes from 24 countries participated in the event.

- Australia (2)
- Canada (1)
- China (2)
- Estonia (1)
- Germany (1)
- Italy (1)
- Jamaica (1)
- Japan (1)
- Latvia (1)
- Mexico (1)
- Netherlands (1)
- New Zealand (1)
- Russia (2)
- Saint Vincent and the Grenadines (1)
- South Africa (1)
- Sudan (1)
- Sweden (1)
- Syria (1)
- Trinidad and Tobago (1)
- Turkey (2)
- Ukraine (1)
- United Kingdom (1)
- United States (2)
- Zimbabwe (1)
