= 2005 Asian Athletics Championships – Women's 400 metres =

The women's 400 metres event at the 2005 Asian Athletics Championships was held in Incheon, South Korea on September 1–3.

== Medalists ==
Gold	Silver	Bronze
Manjeet Kaur; India	Sathi Geetha; India	Asami Tanno; Japan

== Results ==
=== Heats ===
Rank	Heat	Name	Nationality	Time	Notes
1	2	Satti Geetha	India	52.83	Q
2	1	Tatyana Khadjimuratova	Kazakhstan	53.00	Q
3	1	Manjeet Kaur	India	53.12	Q
4	2	Olga Tereshkova	Kazakhstan	53.20	Q
5	1	Asami Tanno	Japan	53.44	Q
6	2	Menike Wickramasinghe	Sri Lanka	54.05	Q
7	2	Zhong Shaoting	China	54.42	q
8	1	Xie Qing	China	54.78	q
9	2	Mayu Sato	Japan	55.30	
10	1	Mary Grace Melgar	Philippines	55.48	
11	2	Choi Ju-Young	South Korea	59.20	
12	1	Park Jong-Kyung	South Korea	1:00.41	
13	2	Batgereliin Möngöntuyaa	Mongolia	1:00.81	

=== Final ===
Rank	Name	Nationality	Time	Notes
1st place, gold medalist(s)	Manjeet Kaur	India	51.50	SB
2nd place, silver medalist(s)	Satti Geetha	India	51.75	PB
3rd place, bronze medalist(s)	Asami Tanno	Japan	52.91	
4	Tatyana Khadjimuratova	Kazakhstan	52.96	
5	Olga Tereshkova	Kazakhstan	52.99	SB
6	Menike Wickramasinghe	Sri Lanka	53.80	
7	Zhong Shaoting	China	54.21	
8	Xie Qing	China	55.11	
