= Manjeet Kaur =

Indian sprinter (born 1982)

Personal information
- Born: 4 April 1982 (age 44)
Medal record
Women's athletics
Representing India
Asian Games
| Gold medal – first place | 2006 Doha | 4 × 400 m |
| Gold medal – first place | 2010 Guangzhou | 4 × 400 m |
| Silver medal – second place | 2006 Doha | 400 m |
Asian Championships
| Gold medal – first place | 2005 Incheon | 400 m |
| Gold medal – first place | 2005 Incheon | 4 × 400 m |
| Gold medal – first place | 2007 Amman | 4 × 400 m |
| Silver medal – second place | 2009 Guangzhou | 4 × 400 m |
| Bronze medal – third place | 2003 Manila | 4 × 400 m |
| Bronze medal – third place | 2009 Guangzhou | 400 m |
Asian Indoor Championships
| Gold medal – first place | 2008 Doha | 4 × 400 m |
Commonwealth Games
| Gold medal – first place | 2010 Delhi | 4 × 400 m relay |
| Silver medal – second place | 2006 Melbourne | 4 × 400 m relay |

Manjeet Kaur (born 4 April 1982) is an Indian sprint athlete from Punjab who specializes in 400 metres. She held the 400 m National record of 51.05 seconds set at the National Circuit Athletic Meet held in Chennai on 16 June 2004. She broke the previous record held by K. M. Beenamol since November 2001. In doing so, she passed the qualifying mark for the 2004 Athens Olympics. She along with Chitra K. Soman, Rajwinder Kaur and K. M. Beenamol form the team that holds the current National record in 4 × 400 metres relay.

A Deputy Superintendent of Police (DSP) in the Punjab Police, Manjeet competed for India in 4 × 400 metres relay at 2004 Athens Olympics where her team set the current National record with a time of 3:26.89. The team finished third in their heats. In the next Beijing Olympics also she represented India in 4 × 400 metres relay where her team composed of Sathi Geetha, Chitra K. Soman, and Mandeep Kaur clocked a time of 3:28.83 and finished seventh in their heats.

In Doha Asian Games in 2006, Manjeet led India to a 4 × 400 metres relay gold. Earlier at the same event, she had also won a silver medal in Women's 400 metres race behind eventual winner Olga Tereshkova from Kazakhstan. In 2005, she was conferred the Arjuna Award for her contribution to the Indian athletics.

Manjeet Kaur won the gold medal at the 2010 Commonwealth Games in 4 × 400 m relay event with Mandeep Kaur, Sini Jose and Ashwini Akkunji.
