= 2007 Asian Athletics Championships – Women's hammer throw =

The women's hammer throw event at the 2007 Asian Athletics Championships was held in Amman, Jordan on July 25.

== Results ==
Rank	Name	Nationality	Result	Notes
1st place, gold medalist(s)	Liao Xiaoyan	China	60.58	
2nd place, silver medalist(s)	Kang Na-Ru	South Korea	57.38	
3rd place, bronze medalist(s)	Huang Chih-feng	Chinese Taipei	55.37	
4	Miki Yamashiro	Japan	54.52	
5	Siti Shahida Abdullah	Malaysia	50.81	
6	Yurita Ariani Arsyad	Indonesia	47.25	
7	Loralie Amahit	Philippines	46.6	
