= 2007 Asian Athletics Championships – Women's 3000 metres steeplechase =

The women's 3000 metres steeplechase event at the 2007 Asian Athletics Championships was held in Amman, Jordan on July 27. This was the first time that this event was held at the Asian Championships.

== Results ==
Rank	Name	Nationality	Time	Notes
1st place, gold medalist(s)	Zhao Yanni	China	10:48.18	
2nd place, silver medalist(s)	Baraah Awadallah	Jordan	12:03.04	
3rd place, bronze medalist(s)	Leila Ebrahimi	Iran	12:12.40	
4	Iman Al-Jallad	Syria	13:07.39	
