= Athletics at the 2007 Summer Universiade – Women's 400 metres =

The women's 400 metres event at the 2007 Summer Universiade was held on 9–11 August.

== Medalists ==
Gold	Silver	Bronze
Olga Tereshkova; Kazakhstan	Danijela Grgić; Croatia	Ksenia Zadorina; Russia

== Results ==
=== Heats ===
Qualification: First 3 of each heat (Q) and the next 4 fastest (q) qualified for the semifinals.

Rank	Heat	Name	Nationality	Time	Notes
1	3	Ksenia Zadorina	Russia	52.41	Q
2	1	Antonina Yefremova	Ukraine	52.90	Q
3	3	Olha Zavhorodnya	Ukraine	53.23	Q
4	2	Zudikey Rodríguez	Mexico	53.42	Q
5	4	Danijela Grgić	Croatia	53.51	Q
6	4	Olga Tereshkova	Kazakhstan	53.59	Q
7	3	Maris Mägi	Estonia	53.66	Q
8	3	Kelly Massey	Great Britain	53.69	q
9	4	Özge Akin	Turkey	53.77	Q
10	2	Olga Shulikova	Russia	53.86	Q
11	3	Justine Bayigga	Uganda	53.97	q
12	2	Martina Näf	Switzerland	54.00	Q
13	3	Jūratė Kudirkaitė	Lithuania	54.29	q
14	1	Faye Harding	Great Britain	54.35	Q
15	4	Mame Fatou Faye	Senegal	54.90	q
16	2	Marina Maslenko	Kazakhstan	54.94	
17	3	Saowalee Kaewchuay	Thailand	55.15	
18	1	Lucy Jaramillo	Ecuador	55.20	Q
19	2	Tiziana Grasso	Italy	55.22	
20	1	Zahra Bouras	Algeria	55.28	PB
21	4	Vaya Vladeva	Bulgaria	57.32	
22	4	Naisna Pinhard	Liberia	57.54	
23	2	Munguntuya Batgerel	Mongolia	58.71	
24	4	Waeowta Kongchan	Thailand	59.68	
25	1	Le Thi Diep	Vietnam	1:04.46	
26	2	Ruth Litebele	Zambia	1:10.06	
	1	Patricia Lopes	Portugal	DNS	

=== Semifinals ===
Qualification: First 4 of each semifinal qualified directly (Q) for the final.

Rank	Heat	Name	Nationality	Time	Notes
1	1	Danijela Grgić	Croatia	52.53	Q
2	1	Ksenia Zadorina	Russia	52.57	Q
3	2	Olga Tereshkova	Kazakhstan	52.69	Q, SB
4	2	Olga Shulikova	Russia	52.80	Q
5	2	Antonina Yefremova	Ukraine	52.87	Q
6	2	Martina Näf	Switzerland	52.98	Q
7	1	Olha Zavhorodnya	Ukraine	52.99	Q
8	2	Zudikey Rodríguez	Mexico	53.16	
9	1	Maris Mägi	Estonia	53.53	Q
10	1	Faye Harding	Great Britain	53.55	
11	2	Kelly Massey	Great Britain	54.01	
12	1	Justine Bayigga	Uganda	54.14	
13	2	Jūratė Kudirkaitė	Lithuania	54.69	
14	1	Lucy Jaramillo	Ecuador	55.05	
15	1	Mame Fatou Faye	Senegal	55.27	
	2	Özge Akin	Turkey	DNF	

=== Final ===
Rank	Lane	Name	Nationality	Time	Notes
1st place, gold medalist(s)	4	Olga Tereshkova	Kazakhstan	51.62	
2nd place, silver medalist(s)	5	Danijela Grgić	Croatia	51.88	
3rd place, bronze medalist(s)	6	Ksenia Zadorina	Russia	51.89	
4	7	Antonina Yefremova	Ukraine	52.09	
5	3	Olga Shulikova	Russia	52.59	
6	8	Martina Näf	Switzerland	52.94	
7	2	Olha Zavhorodnya	Ukraine	53.21	
8	1	Maris Mägi	Estonia	54.21	
