= Natsumi Watanabe =

Japanese sprinter

Personal information
- Nationality: Japanese
- Born: 16 August 1988 (age 37) Niigata Prefecture, Japan
- Education: Fukushima University
- Height: 1.65 m (5 ft 5 in)
- Weight: 50 kg (110 lb)

Sport
- Country: Japan
- Sport: Track and field
- Event: 400 metres

Achievements and titles
- Personal best(s): 400 m: 53.40 (Osaka 2007); 800 m: 2:06.31 (Akita 2007)
Medal record
Women's athletics
Representing Japan
Asian Championships
| Silver medal – second place | 2007 Amman | 4×400 m relay |

Natsumi Watanabe (渡辺 なつみ, Watanabe Natsumi; born 16 August 1988 in Niigata Prefecture) is a Japanese track and field athlete who specialized in the 400 metres. She was selected to be a part of the 2007 World Championships as a reserve but did not compete.

== Personal bests ==
| Event | Time | Competition | Venue | Date |
|---|---|---|---|---|
| 400 m | 53.40 | Japanese Championships | Osaka, Japan | 29 June 2007 |
| 800 m | 2:06.31 | National Sports Festival | Akita, Japan | 7 October 2007 |

== International competition ==
| Year | Competition | Venue | Position | Event | Time |
Representing Japan
| 2007 | Asian Championships | Amman, Jordan | 7th | 400 m | 56.66 |
| 2007 | Asian Championships | Amman, Jordan | 2nd | 4×400 m relay | 3:33.82 (relay leg: 3rd) |
