= 2015 Asian Athletics Championships – Women's 400 metres hurdles =

The women's 400 metres hurdles event at the 2015 Asian Athletics Championships was held on the 4 and 6 of June.

== Medalists ==
Gold	Oluwakemi Adekoya; Bahrain
Silver	Manami Kira; Japan
Bronze	Xiao Xia; China

== Results ==
=== Heats ===
First 3 in each heat (Q) and the next 2 fastest (q) qualified for the final.

Rank	Heat	Name	Nationality	Time	Notes
1	2	Oluwakemi Adekoya	Bahrain	55.84	Q
2	2	Manami Kira	Japan	58.02	Q
3	2	Aleksandra Romanova	Kazakhstan	58.94	Q
4	1	Xiao Xia	China	59.06	Q
5	1	Akiko Ito	Japan	59.20	Q
6	2	Anu Raghavan	India	59.28	q
7	1	Jo Eun-ju	South Korea	1:00.06	Q
8	2	Ghofran Al-Mohammad	Syria	1:00.59	q
9	1	Niluka Gamaralalage	Sri Lanka	1:00.66	
10	1	Lam Christy Ho Yan	Hong Kong	1:05.09	
	2	Wang Huan	China	DNF	

=== Final ===
Rank	Lane	Name	Nationality	Result	Notes
1st place, gold medalist(s)	4	Oluwakemi Adekoya	Bahrain	54.31	CR
2nd place, silver medalist(s)	3	Manami Kira	Japan	57.14	
3rd place, bronze medalist(s)	5	Xiao Xia	China	57.69	
4	2	Anu Raghavan	India	57.79	
5	7	Aleksandra Romanova	Kazakhstan	58.03	
6	1	Ghofran Al-Mohammad	Syria	58.68	
7	6	Akiko Ito	Japan	59.08	
8	8	Jo Eun-ju	South Korea	59.90	
