= Xiao Xia =

Chinese hurdler (born 1991)

Personal information
- Born: 6 June 1991 (age 35)

Sport
- Country: China
- Sport: Track and field
- Event: 400 metres hurdles
- Updated on 29 August 2015

Xiao Xia (Chinese: 肖霞; born 6 June 1991) is a Chinese athlete specialising in the 400 metres hurdles. She represented her country at the 2015 World Championships in Beijing without advancing from the first round.

Her personal best in the event is 56.25 seconds set in Shenyang in 2013. That year she was the gold medalist at the East Asian Games.

== International competitions ==
Year	Competition	Venue	Position	Event	Notes
Representing China
2013	East Asian Games	Tianjin, China	1st	400 m hurdles	56.97
2014	Asian Games	Incheon, South Korea	3rd	400 m hurdles	56.59
2015	Asian Championships	Wuhan, China	3rd	400 m hurdles	57.69
2015	World Championships	Beijing, China	32nd (h)	400 m hurdles	58.12
