= 2009 Asian Athletics Championships – Women's 400 metres hurdles =

The women's 400 metres hurdles event at the 2009 Asian Athletics Championships was held at the Guangdong Olympic Stadium on November 13.

== Results ==
Rank	Lane	Name	Nationality	Time	Notes
1st place, gold medalist(s)	6	Satomi Kubokura	Japan	56.62	
2nd place, silver medalist(s)	4	Noraseela Mohd Khalid	Malaysia	57.15	
3rd place, bronze medalist(s)	1	Natalya Asanova	Uzbekistan	59.37	
4	3	Yang Qi	China	59.62	
5	8	Nguyen Thi Bac	Vietnam	1:00.87	
6	7	Liliya Nizamova	Kazakhstan	1:02.15	
7	5	Sayaka Aoki	Japan	1:02.21	
8	2	Rania Al-Qebali	Jordan	1:10.15	
