= Sayaka Aoki (athlete) =

Japanese sprinter and hurdler

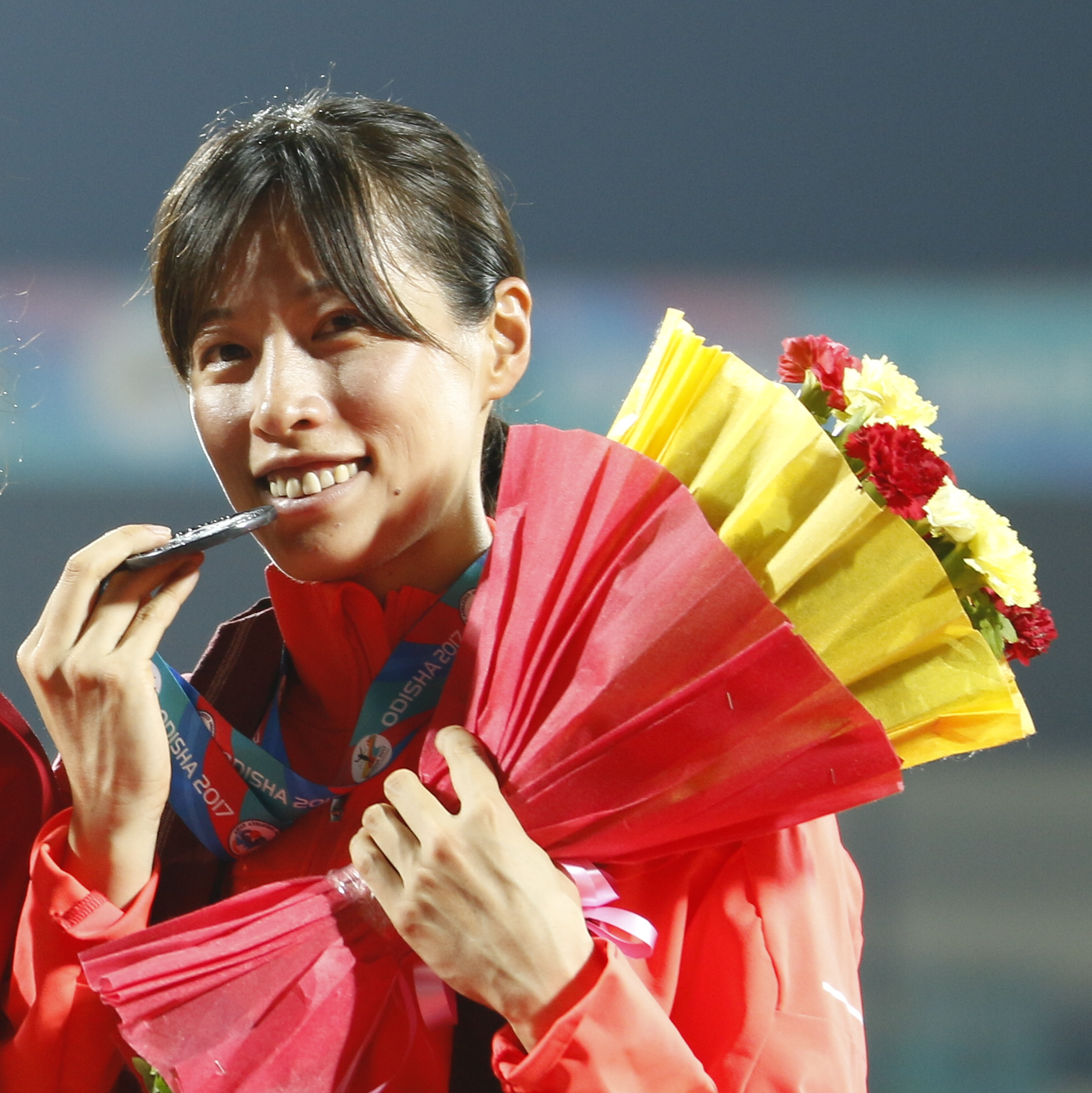
- in India in 2017

Personal information
- Native name: 青木 沙弥佳
- Nationality: Japanese
- Born: 15 December 1986 (age 39) Gifu Prefecture, Japan
- Height: 1.62 m (5 ft 4 in)
- Weight: 49 kg (108 lb)

Sport
- Sport: Athletics
- Event: 4 × 400 metres relay
- College team: Fukushima University

Achievements and titles
- Personal best: 400 m: 53.40 s (2007)
Medal record
Women's athletics
Representing Japan
Asian Championships
Silver medal – second place	2007 Amman	4×400 m

Sayaka Aoki (青木 沙弥佳, Aoki Sayaka; born 15 December 1986 in Gifu Prefecture) is a Japanese track and field sprinter and hurdler, who specializes in the 400 metres sprint and 400 metres hurdles. She competed for her country as part of the Japanese women's 4 × 400 metres relay team at the Summer Olympics in 2008 and the World Championships in Athletics three times (2007, 2009, 2015). She has been a four-time medallist in the relay at the Asian Athletics Championships (2007, 2011, 2013, 2017), including a gold medal in 2011. She won her first major international medal in the hurdles – a bronze – at the 2017 Asian Athletics Championships.

Aoki competed for the women's 4 × 400 m relay at the 2008 Summer Olympics in Beijing, along with her teammates Mayu Kida, Satomi Kubokura, and Asami Tanno. She ran on the anchor leg of the first heat, with an individual-split time of 52.64 seconds. Aoki and her team finished the relay in last place for a seasonal best time of 3:30.52, failing to advance into the final.

Born in Gifu Prefecture, she attended Fukushima University and represented her country as a student-athlete at the 2007 Universiade.

== International competitions ==
Year	Competition	Venue	Position	Event	Notes
Representing Japan
2007	Asian Championships	Amman, Jordan	5th	400 m hurdles	59.55
2007	Asian Championships	Amman, Jordan	2nd	4 × 400 m relay	3:33.82
2007	Universiade	Bangkok, Thailand	12th (h)	400 m hurdles	58.80
2007	World Championships	Osaka, Japan	11th (h)	4 × 400 m relay	3:30.17
2008	Olympic Games	Beijing, China	15th (h)	4 × 400 m relay	3:30.52
2009	World Championships	Berlin, Germany	38th (h)	400 m hurdles	63.56
2009	World Championships	Berlin, Germany	14th (h)	4 × 400 m relay	3:34.46
2009	Asian Championships	Guangzhou, China	7th	400 m hurdles	62.21
2010	Asian Games	Guangzhou, China	4th	4 × 400 m relay	3:31.81
2011	Asian Championships	Kobe, Japan	4th	400 m	54.15
2011	Asian Championships	Kobe, Japan	1st	4 × 400 m relay	3:35.00
2013	Asian Championships	Pune, India	3rd	4 × 400 m relay	3:35.72
2013	East Asian Games	Tianjin, China	2nd	400 m hurdles	58.06
2013	East Asian Games	Tianjin, China	2nd	4 × 400 m relay	3:40.55
2015	IAAF World Relays	Nassau, Bahamas	2nd (B)	4 × 400 m relay	3:34.65
2015	Asian Championships	Wuhan, China	6th	400 m	54.61
2015	Asian Championships	Wuhan, China	4th	4 × 400 m relay	3:35.93
2015	World Championships	Beijing, China	13th (h)	4 × 400 m relay	3:28.91
2017	Asian Championships	Bhubaneswar, India	3rd	400 m hurdles	58.18
2017	Asian Championships	Bhubaneswar, India	3rd	4 × 400 m relay	3:37.74
2019	Asian Championships	Doha, Qatar	10th (h)	400 m hurdles	59.43
