= 2011 Asian Athletics Championships – Women's 400 metres hurdles =

The wen's 400 metres hurdles at the 2011 Asian Athletics Championships was held at the Kobe Universiade Memorial Stadium on 8 and 9 July.

== Medalists ==
Gold	Satomi Kubokura; Japan
Silver	Qi Yang; China
Bronze	Christine Merril; Sri Lanka

== Records ==
2011 Asian Athletics Championships
World record	Yuliya Pechonkina (RUS)	52.34	Tula, Russia	8 August 2003
Asian record	Han Qing (CHN)	53.96	Beijing, China	26 September 1993
Championship record	Huang Xiaoxiao (CHN)	55.63	Incheon, South Korea	2005

== Schedule ==
Date	Time	Round
8 July 2011	11:10	Round 1
9 July 2011	18:35	Final

== Results ==
=== Round 1 ===
First 3 in each heat (Q) and 2 best performers (q) advanced to the finals.

Rank	Heat	Name	Nationality	Time	Notes
1	1	Satomi Kubokura	Japan	56.66	Q
2	1	Qi Yang	China	56.77	Q SB
3	1	Christine Merril	Sri Lanka	56.83	Q, NR
4	2	Miyabi Tago	Japan	57.77	Q
5	2	Shiori Miki	Japan	58.11	Q
6	2	Alexandra Kuzina	Kazakhstan	58.21	Q
7	2	Nataliya Asanova	Uzbekistan	58.45	q
8	1	Noraseela Mohd Khalid	Malaysia	58.91	q
9	2	Alaa Al-Qaysi	Iraq	1:00.36	SB
10	1	Iuliia Khodykina	Kyrgyzstan	1:03.35	

=== Final ===
Rank	Lane	Name	Nationality	Time	Notes
1st place, gold medalist(s)	5	Satomi Kubokura	Japan	56.52	
2nd place, silver medalist(s)	6	Qi Yang	China	56.69	SB
3rd place, bronze medalist(s)	9	Christine Merril	Sri Lanka	57.30	
4	7	Miyabi Tago	Japan	57.35	
5	4	Shiori Miki	Japan	57.52	
6	8	Alexandra Kuzina	Kazakhstan	57.86	
7	2	Noraseela Mohd Khalid	Malaysia	58.53	
8	3	Nataliya Asanova	Uzbekistan	59.72	
