= Baraah Awadallah =

Jordanian middle-distance runner

Personal information
- Full name: Baraah Awadallah Marouane
- Nationality: Jordan
- Born: 21 December 1991 (age 34) Irbid, Jordan
- Height: 1.64 m (5 ft 4 1/2 in)
- Weight: 52 kg (115 lb)

Sport
- Sport: Athletics
- Event: 800 metres

Achievements and titles
- Personal best: 800 m: 2:18.41 (2008)
Medal record
Women's athletics
Representing Jordan
Asian Championships
Silver medal – second place	2007 Amman	3000 m st.

Baraah Awadallah Marouane (Arabic: براء عوض الله مروان; born December 21, 1991, in Irbid) is a Jordanian middle distance runner. Awadallah represented Jordan at the 2008 Summer Olympics in Beijing, where she competed for the women's 800 metres. She ran in the first heat of the event, against six other athletes, including Russia's Svetlana Klyuka, who nearly missed out of the medal podium in the final. She finished the race in last place by fifteen seconds behind Australia's Madeleine Pape, with her personal and seasonal best time of 2:18.41. Awadallah, however, failed to advance into the semi-finals, as she placed thirty-seventh overall, and was ranked further below three mandatory slots for the next round. She was eventually upgraded to a higher overall position, when Croatia's Vanja Perišić had been disqualified for failing the doping test.
