= Natalya Asanova =

Uzbekistani hurdler (born 1989)

Personal information
- Born: November 29, 1989 (age 36) Andijan, Uzbek SSR, Soviet Union
- Education: Uzbek State Institute of Physical Education
- Height: 1.77 m (5 ft 9 1/2 in)
- Weight: 58 kg (128 lb)

Sport
- Country: Uzbekistan
- Sport: Athletics
- Event: 400 m hurdles
- Coached by: Gennady Arzumanov

Natalya Asanova (Cyrillic: Наталья Асанова; born 29 November 1989 in Andijan Region) is an Uzbekistani athlete specialising in the 400 metres hurdles. She represented her country at the 2012 Summer Olympics and 2016 Summer Olympics without qualifying for the final.

Her personal best in the event is 56.13, set in Tashkent in 2012.

== International competitions ==
Year	Competition	Venue	Position	Event	Notes
Representing Uzbekistan
2006	Asian Junior Championships	Macau	3rd	100 m hurdles	14.24
2006	World Junior Championships	Beijing, China	35th (h)	100 m hurdles	14.48 (+0.1 m/s)
2009	Asian Championships	Guangzhou, China	3rd	400 m hurdles	59.37
2010	Asian Games	Guangzhou, China	6th	400 m hurdles	57.25
2011	Asian Championships	Kobe, Japan	8th	400 m hurdles	59.72
2012	Olympic Games	London, United Kingdom	35th (h)	400 m hurdles	58.05
2014	Asian Indoor Championships	Hangzhou, China	6th	400 m	56.96
2014	Asian Games	Incheon, South Korea	8th	400 m hurdles	60.42
2016	Olympic Games	Rio de Janeiro, Brazil	46th (h)	400 m hurdles	62.37
