= Athletics at the 2010 Asian Games – Women's 400 metres hurdles =

Women's 400 metres hurdles at the 2010 Asian Games
- Venue: Aoti Main Stadium
- Dates: 24–25 November 2010
- Competitors: 10 from 7 nations

Medalists
gold medal	Ashwini Akkunji	India
silver medal	Wang Xing	China
bronze medal	Satomi Kubokura	Japan

The women's 400 metres hurdles event at the 2010 Asian Games was held at the Aoti Main Stadium, Guangzhou, China on 24–25 November.

== Schedule ==
All times are China Standard Time (UTC+08:00)

Date	Time	Event
Wednesday, 24 November 2010	09:25	Round 1
Thursday, 25 November 2010	18:50	Final

== Records ==
Prior to this competition, the existing world, Asian and Games records were as follows.

World Record	Yuliya Pechonkina (RUS)	52.34	Tula, Russia	8 August 2003
Asian Record	Han Qing (CHN); Song Yinglan (CHN)	53.96	Beijing, China; Guangzhou, China	9 September 1993; 22 November 2001
Games Record	Leng Xueyan (CHN)	55.26	Hiroshima, Japan	14 October 1994

== Results ==
Legend

- DNS — Did not start

=== Round 1 ===
- Qualification: First 3 in each heat (Q) and the next 2 fastest (q) advance to the final.

==== Heat 1 ====
Rank	Athlete	Time	Notes
1	Ashwini Akkunji (IND)	56.43	Q
2	Miyabi Tago (JPN)	57.07	Q
3	Wang Xing (CHN)	57.14	Q
4	Natalya Asanova (UZB)	57.16	q
—	Fatima Dahman (YEM)	DNS	

==== Heat 2 ====
Rank	Athlete	Time	Notes
1	Jauna Murmu (IND)	57.17	Q
2	Satomi Kubokura (JPN)	57.29	Q
3	Yang Qi (CHN)	57.71	Q
4	Noraseela Mohd Khalid (MAS)	58.16	q
5	Nguyễn Thị Bắc (VIE)	1:01.17	

=== Final ===
Rank	Athlete	Time	Notes
1st place, gold medalist(s)	Ashwini Akkunji (IND)	56.15	
2nd place, silver medalist(s)	Wang Xing (CHN)	56.76	
3rd place, bronze medalist(s)	Satomi Kubokura (JPN)	56.83	
4	Jauna Murmu (IND)	56.88	
5	Noraseela Mohd Khalid (MAS)	57.22	
6	Natalya Asanova (UZB)	57.25	
7	Miyabi Tago (JPN)	57.35	
8	Yang Qi (CHN)	58.67	
