= Ashwini Akkunji =

Indian sprinter (born 1987)

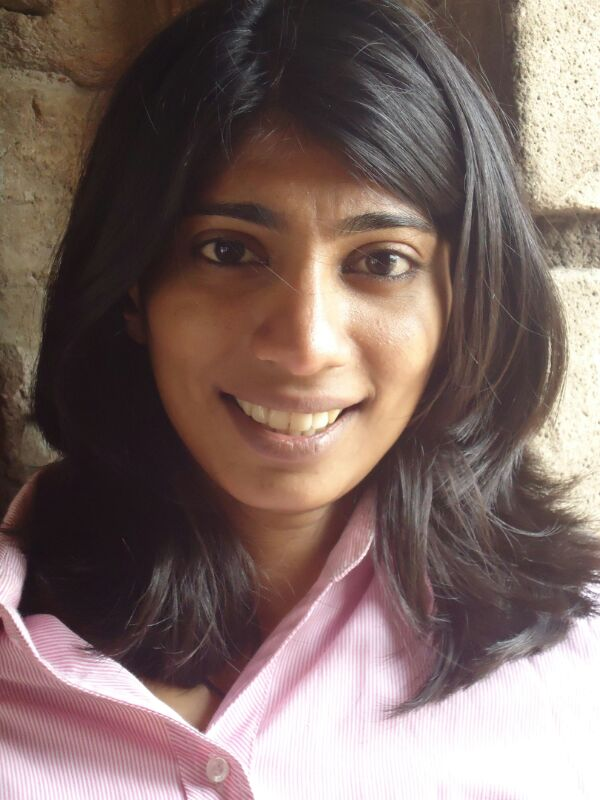
- Ashwini in 2014

Personal information
- Nationality: Indian
- Born: Ashwini Chidananda Shetty Akkunji; 7 October 1987 (age 38) Siddapura, Udupi, India
- Height: 184 cm (6 ft 0 in)

Sport
- Country: India
- Sport: Athletics

Achievements and titles
- Personal bests: 400 m: 52.82 (Bangalore 2011); 400 m hurdles: 56.15 (Guangzhou 2010)
Medal record
Women's athletics
Representing India
Asian Games
| Gold medal – first place | 2010 Guangzhou | 400 m hurdles |
| Gold medal – first place | 2010 Guangzhou | 4×400 m |
Asian Indoor Championships
| Gold medal – first place | 2010 Tehran | 4×400 m |
South Asian Games
| Silver medal – second place | 2016 Guwahati | 400 m hurdles |
Commonwealth Games
| Gold medal – first place | 2010 Delhi | 4×400 m |

Ashwini Chidananda Shetty Akkunji (born 7 October 1987) is an Indian sprint athlete from Siddapura, Udupi who specializes in 400 metres. Ashwini has won gold medals at the 2010 Commonwealth Games and the 2010 Asian Games in 4 × 400 m relay team event with Manjeet Kaur, Mandeep Kaur and Sini Jose and an individual gold medal in the 400 metres hurdles on 25 November 2010 at the 2010 Asian Games held at Guangzhou, in China. She is also a recipient of the Rajyotsava Prashasti (2010), a civilian honour awarded by the Indian State Government of Karnataka

== Biography ==
Born in Siddapura, Udupi, Kundapura taluk, Udupi district, Karnataka, she was raised in a Tulu-speaking family to her mother, Yashoda Shetty Akkunji and father, B.R. Chidananda Shetty. Ashwini hails from an agriculturist family. with a sporting legacy. She grew up on her family's 5 acre farmland amidst Areca nut plantations along with her elder siblings a sister, Dipti and a brother, Amith. Earlier, Ashwini was employed with the Indian Railways, and as a manager in Corporation bank in Patiala, Punjab and presently works as a coach in Sports Authority of India Bangalore.

== Doping ==
In July 2011 prior to Asian athletics championships in Kobe (Japan) she tested positive for anabolic steroids. She was subsequently dropped from the athletics team for the event and was suspended from athletics. She denied the charges, but on 23 December 2011 the NADA banned her for a year. The Court of Arbitration for Sport (CAS) upheld an appeal by the International Association of Athletics Federations against lighter sentences and handed Ashwini and five other athletes (Mandeep Kaur, Sini Jose, Jauna Murmu, Tiana Mary and Priyanka Panwar) a two-year ban.

== Awards, rewards and recognition ==
She was given the Karnataka Rajyotsava Award in 2010. This comprised a cash payment of one hundred thousand Rupees, a 20 gramme gold medallion and a grant of priority in the allotment of house sites by the Bangalore Development Authority (BDA). She has been rewarded financially by both the national and state governments, as well as Indian Railways, in recognition of the gold medals won in 2010.
