= Zhao Yanni =

Chinese long-distance runner

Medal record

Women's athletics

Representing China

Asian Championships
Gold medal – first place	2007 Amman	3000 m st.

Zhao Yanni (Chinese: 赵艳妮, born 27 November 1986 in Yantai, Shandong province, China) is a female Chinese long-distance runner who specializes in the 3000 metres steeplechase. She won the gold medal at the 2007 Asian Championships, and represented China at the 2008 Summer Olympics, coming in 16th with a time of 10:36.77 minutes.

Her personal best time is 9:43.60 minutes, achieved in June 2008 in Suzhou, China. In the 3000 metres, she has 9:12.49 minutes, achieved in October 2006 in Yantai, China.
