= Yang Xiaoyan =

Yang Xiaoyan may refer to:

- Yang Xiaoyan (bridge) (杨小燕)
- Yang Xiaoyan (sailor) (楊曉燕)
- Yang Xiaoyan (writer) (杨筱燕), nominated for Golden Rooster Award for Best Writing
