= Miyabi Tago =

Japanese hurdler

Personal information
- Nationality: Japanese
- Born: 15 July 1988 (age 38) Saitama Prefecture, Japan
- Education: Chuo University
- Height: 1.69 m (5 ft 7 in)
- Weight: 51 kg (112 lb)

Sport
- Country: Japan
- Sport: Track and field
- Event: 400 metres hurdles
- Retired: September 2016

Achievements and titles
- Personal bests: 400 m hurdles: 55.99 (Osaka 2010); 400 m: 54.54 (Tokyo 2010)
Medal record
Women's athletics
Representing Japan
East Asian Games
Gold medal – first place	2009 Hong Kong	400 m hurdles

Miyabi Tago (田子 雅, Tago Miyabi; born 15 July 1988 in Saitama Prefecture) is a Japanese retired track and field hurdler who specialized in the 400 metres hurdles. She won a gold medal at the 2009 East Asian Games, finished seventh at the 2010 Asian Games and finished fourth at the 2011 Asian Championships.

== Personal bests ==
Event	Time (s)	Competition	Venue	Date
400 m hurdles	49.45	Osaka Grand Prix	Osaka, Japan	8 May 2010
400 m	54.54	National University Championships	Tokyo, Japan	10 September 2010

== International competition ==
Year	Competition	Venue	Position	Event	Time (s)
Representing Japan
2009	East Asian Games	Hong Kong, China	1st	400 m hurdles	59.23
2010	Asian Games	Guangzhou, China	7th	400 m hurdles	57.35
2011	Asian Championships	Kobe, Japan	4th	400 m hurdles	57.35
