= Novopokrovka, Kazakhstan =

Village in Jetisu Region, Kazakhstan

Novopokrovka
- Village
- Location in Kazakhstan
- Coordinates: 45°27′03″N 79°59′21″E
- Country: Kazakhstan
- Region: Jetisu Region
- Time zone: UTC+6 (Omsk Time)

Novopokrovka is a village in Jetisu Region, in south-eastern Kazakhstan.
