= 2013 Asian Athletics Championships – Women's 400 metres hurdles =

The women's 400 metres hurdles event at the 2013 Asian Athletics Championships was held at the Shree Shiv Chhatrapati Sports Complex on 7 July.

== Results ==
Rank	Name	Nationality	Time	Notes
1st place, gold medalist(s)	Satomi Kubokura	Japan	56.82	
2nd place, silver medalist(s)	Manami Kira	Japan	57.78	
3rd place, bronze medalist(s)	Jo Eun-ju	South Korea	58.21	
4	Christine Sonali Merrill	Sri Lanka	59.72	
5	Nguyen Thi Huyen	Vietnam	1:01.68	
6	Elavarasi Rajan	India	1:04.12	
	Tatyana Azarova	Kazakhstan	DNS	
	Raghavan Anu	India	DNS	
