= Sini Jose =

Indian sprinter (born 1987)

Medal record

Women's athletics

Representing India

Asian Games
Gold medal – first place	2010 Guangzhou	4 × 400 m relay

Asian Championships
Gold medal – first place	2007 Amman	4 × 400 m relay
Silver medal – second place	2009 Guangzhou	4 × 400 m relay

Asian Indoor Championships
Gold medal – first place	2008 Doha	4 × 400 m relay

Commonwealth Games
Gold medal – first place	2010 Delhi	4 × 400 m relay

Sini Jose (born 25 May 1987) is an Indian sprint athlete from Ernakulam district, Kerala, who specializes in 400 metres. Sini won the gold medal at the 2010 Commonwealth Games and 2010 Asian Games in 4 × 400 m relay event with Manjeet Kaur, A. C. Ashwini, and Mandeep Kaur.

== Biography ==
Sini hails from Avoly, a village in Muvattupuzha, Ernakulam district, Kerala. Born to Mundackal Jose Joseph and Rithamma Jose, Sini is an employee of Indian Railways at Ernakulam.

Her personal best for 400 m is 53.01 s achieved during the Federation Cup athletics meet in Ranchi on 2 May 2010, where she won a gold medal.
