= Siddapura, Udupi =

Siddapura Siddapur
- village
- Location within Karnataka
- Coordinates: 13°39′48.54″N 74°54′43.59″E
- Postal code: 576229
- Area code: 08259
- Vehicle registration: KA 20
- Lok Sabha constituency: Shivamogga
- Vidhana Sabha constituency: Byndoor

Siddapura is a village in the Kundapur taluk of Udupi district in the Indian state of Karnataka.

The village's name is from Siddlingeshwara Devastana.& Sri ayyappa shwami devasthana nearby Government High school Siddapur..

== Infrastructure ==
A dam built across the Varahi River is nearby.

The Varahi irrigation project and powerplant is about 5 km from Siddapur.

== Geography ==
Agumbe is about 30 km distant. A village near Siddapur is known as Ulloor-74.

== Climate ==
It is a typical South Canara village, hot during summer and heavy rains during monsoon.

== Transport ==
The nearest railway station is Kundapur.SH52 Passes through it and NH66 is 30 km away.

== Demographics ==
It is mainly a Bunts community-dominated area.

== Economy ==
The village has Gokul Industries' cashew nut factory, which also produces fruit and vegetable chips.

== Temples ==
A temple of devi Bhuvaneshwari is situated near Gunjagodu . It is about 25 km from Kundapur. The Anegudde temple is 32 km distant.

Ulloor-74 has the Banashankari Devasthana temple.
