= Rajwinder Kaur (sprinter) =

Indian sprinter (born 1980)

Medal record

Women's athletics

Representing India

Commonwealth Games
Silver medal – second place	2006 Melbourne	4 × 400 m relay

Asian Championships
Gold medal – first place	2005 Incheon	4 × 400 m relay

Rajwinder Kaur (born 21 April 1980) is an Indian sprinter who specializes in the 400 metres.

Kaur finished seventh in the 4 x 400 metres relay at the 2004 Summer Olympics, together with teammates Satti Geetha, K. M. Beenamol and Chitra K. Soman. This team, only with Manjeet Kaur running instead of Geetha, had set a national record of 3:26.89 minutes in the heat. Kaur also ran for the Indian team who won a silver medal at the 2006 Commonwealth Games. Her personal best time in 400 m is 51.57 seconds, achieved in June 2004 in Chennai.

Achievements:

- Finalist, Olympics 2004, Athens (7th position)
- Commonwealth Games 2006, Melbourne (silver medal)
- World Police & Fire Games 2003, Barcelona (triple gold medal)
- Asian Star Meet 2004, Singapore (bronze medal)
- Asian Track and Field 2005, South Korea (gold medal; new meet record)
- Asian Grand Prix meet 2004, Thailand (gold medal)
- Asian Grand Prix Colombo 2004 (national record)
- Asian grand Prix Manila 2004 (gold and bronze medal)
- Indo Pak Games, Patiala (silver medal)
- Invitation meets, Kharkiv, Ukraine (silver medal)
- Invitation meet, Kyiv, Ukraine (gold medal)
