= Anna Gavriushenko =

Kazakhstani sprinter

Medal record

Women's athletics

Representing Kazakhstan

Asian Championships
| Silver medal – second place | 2005 Incheon | 4×400 m |
| Bronze medal – third place | 2007 Amman | 4×400 m |

Asian Indoor Championships
| Gold medal – first place | 2006 Pattaya | 400 m |
| Gold medal – first place | 2006 Pattaya | 4×400 m |
| Silver medal – second place | 2008 Doha | 4×400 m |

Anna Gavriushenko (born 25 May 1982) is a Kazakhstani sprinter who specializes in the 400 metres. Her personal best time is 52.88 seconds, achieved in May 2004 in Bishkek.

== Competition record ==
| Year | Competition | Venue | Position | Event | Notes |
Representing Kazakhstan
| 2005 | Universiade | İzmir, Turkey | 12th (sf) | 400 m | 54.33 |
| 2005 | Universiade | İzmir, Turkey | 6th | 4x400 m relay | 3:32.83 |
| 2005 | Asian Championships | Incheon, South Korea | 6th | 200 m | 24.46 |
| 2005 | Asian Championships | Incheon, South Korea | 2nd | 4x400 m relay | 3:32.61 |
| 2005 | Asian Indoor Games | Macau | 3rd | 400 m | 54.99 |
| 2006 | Asian Indoor Championships | Pattaya, Thailand | 1st | 400 m | 54.89 |
| 2006 | Asian Indoor Championships | Pattaya, Thailand | 1st | 4x400 m relay | 3:41.39 |
| 2007 | Asian Championships | Amman, Jordan | 3rd | 4x400 m relay | 3:50.81 |
| 2007 | Universiade | Bangkok, Thailand | 18th (qf) | 200 m | 24.66 |
| 2007 | Asian Indoor Games | Macau | 1st | 4x400 m relay | 3:37.59 (iAR) |
| 2008 | Asian Indoor Championships | Doha, Qatar | 4th | 400 m | 54.87 |
| 2008 | Asian Indoor Championships | Doha, Qatar | 2nd | 4x400 m relay | 3:38.10 |
| 2009 | Asian Championships | Guangzhou, China | 12th (sf) | 200 m | 24.96 |
| 2009 | Asian Championships | Guangzhou, China | 4th | 4x400 m relay | 3:36.54 |
| 2009 | Asian Indoor Games | Hanoi, Vietnam | 1st | 4x400 m relay | 3:39.21 |
