= Liao Xiaoyan =

Chinese hammer thrower (born 1987)

Medal record

Women's athletics

Representing China

Asian Championships
| Gold medal – first place | 2007 Amman | Hammer throw |

Liao Xiaoyan (Chinese: 廖晓燕; born 8 January 1987) is a Chinese track and field athlete who competes in the hammer throw. She was the gold medallist at the 2007 Asian Athletics Championships.

Among her first major national competitions was the 2005 Chinese City Games, where she was runner-up to future Olympic medallist Zhang Wenxiu. While Zhang had the second best throw ever by a youth athlete, Liao's throw of 65.13 m (213 ft 8 in) ranked her the fifth best ever youth at that point. She still ranks within the top ten youth hammer throwers, as of 2015. She established herself within the top senior domestic athletes in the 2005 season. She threw a new personal best of 65.53 m (214 ft 11 3/4 in) to place fifth at the Chinese Athletics Championships. She came close to her best in the 2006 season with a mark of 65.34 m (214 ft 4 1/4 in).

Liao achieved her personal best of 67.78 m (222 ft 4 1/2 in) in May 2007 in Zhaoqing. The season was the peak of her career as she won the gold medal at the 2007 Asian Athletics Championships in a comparatively low calibre field, where her throw of 60.58 m (198 ft 9 in) was sufficient to win by several metres. She failed to make the Olympic team for the 2008 Beijing Olympics, ending the season with a best of 62.51 m (205 ft 1 in) that year. She had a best of 64.38 m (211 ft 2 1/2 in) in 2009, but ceased to compete at a high level thereafter.
