= Yang Xiaoyan (sailor) =

Chinese sailor

Yang Xiaoyan (Chinese: 楊曉燕; born 3 March 1980) is a Chinese sailor who competed in the 2000 Summer Olympics.
