= Chisato Tanaka =

Japanese sprinter

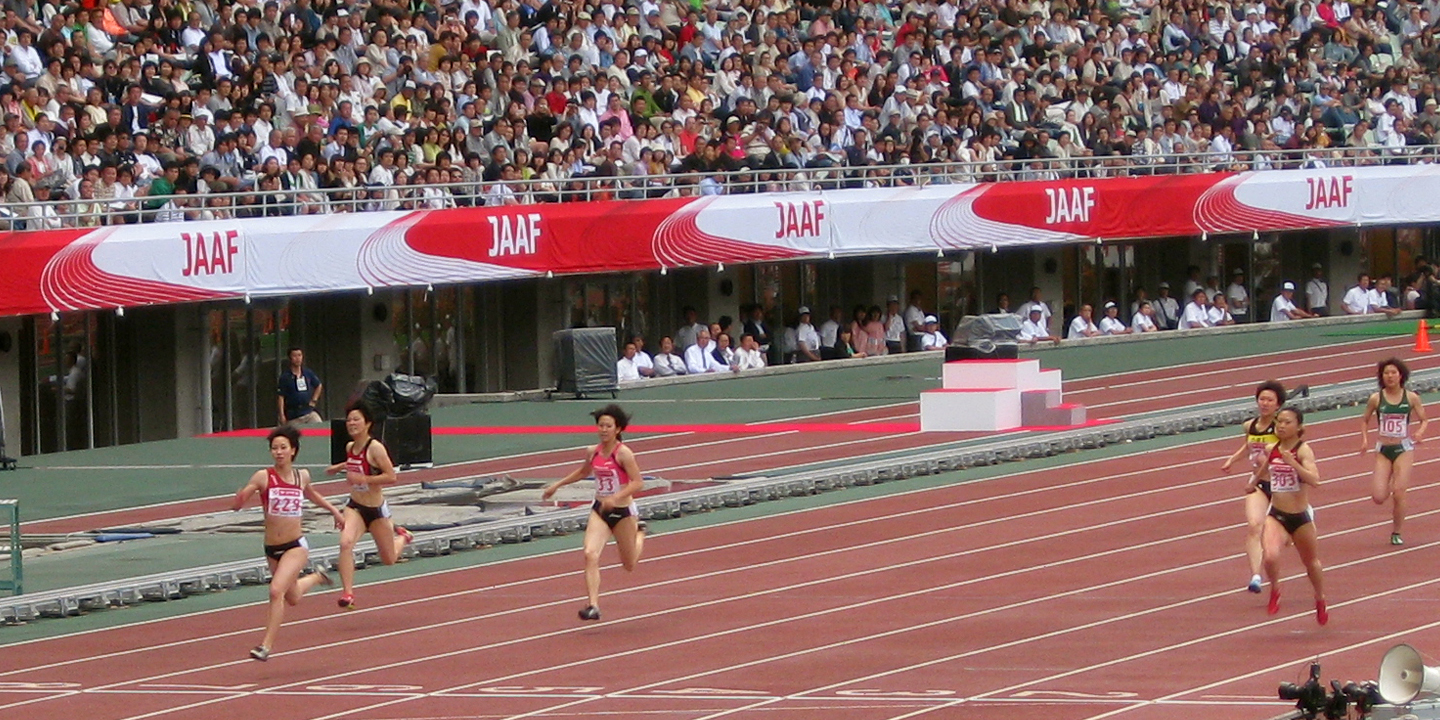
- Tanaka (in black and yellow jersey) at the 2012 Japanese Championships

Personal information
- Nationality: Japanese
- Born: 13 August 1988 (age 38) Fukuoka Prefecture, Japan
- Education: Fukuoka University
- Height: 1.66 m (5 ft 5 in)
- Weight: 54 kg (119 lb)

Sport
- Country: Japan
- Sport: Track and field
- Event: 400 metres

Achievements and titles
- Personal bests: 200 m: 23.94 (2010); 400 m: 53.47 (2008)
Medal record
Women's athletics
Representing Japan
Asian Championships
Gold medal – first place	2011 Kobe	4×400 m relay
Bronze medal – third place	2011 Kobe	400 m

Chisato Tanaka (田中 千智, Tanaka Chisato; born 13 August 1988 in Fukuoka Prefecture) is a Japanese retired track and field sprinter. She won a bronze medal in the 400 metres and a gold medal in the 4 × 400 metres relay at the 2011 Asian Championships in Kobe. She was also the 2010 Japanese national champion in the 400 metres.

== Personal bests ==
Event	Time	Competition	Venue	Date
200 m	23.94 (wind: +1.4 m/s)	National University Individual Championships	Hiratsuka, Japan	19 June 2010
400 m	53.47	National University Championships	Tokyo, Japan	12 September 2008

== International competition ==
Year	Competition	Venue	Position	Event	Time	Notes
Representing Japan
2005	World Youth Championships	Marrakesh, Morocco	40th (h)	200 m	25.30 (wind: +0.7 m/s)	
2010	Asian Games	Guangzhou, China	10th (h)	400 m	53.99	
2010	Asian Games	Guangzhou, China	4th	4×400 m relay	3:31.81 (relay leg: 4th)	SB
2011	Asian Championships	Kobe, Japan	3rd	400 m	54.08	SB
2011	Asian Championships	Kobe, Japan	1st	4×400 m relay	3:35.00 (relay leg: 2nd)	

== National title ==
- Japanese Championships
  - 400 m: 2010
