= Marina Maslyonko =

Kazakhstani sprinter (born 1982)

Personal information
- Born: July 3, 1982 (age 43)
- Height: 1.64 m (5 ft 4 1/2 in)
- Weight: 57 kg (126 lb)

Sport
- Country: Kazakhstan
- Sport: Athletics
- Event: 400m
Medal record
Women's athletics
Representing Kazakhstan
Asian Championships
Bronze medal – third place	2007 Amman	4×400 m
Asian Indoor Championships
Gold medal – first place	2010 Tehran	400 m
Silver medal – second place	2008 Doha	400 m
Silver medal – second place	2008 Doha	4×400 m
Silver medal – second place	2010 Tehran	4×400 m

Marina Maslyonko (born 3 July 1982 in Kostanay, Kazakh SSR, Soviet Union) is a Kazakhstani sprinter who specializes in the 400 metres. She represented Kazakhstan at the 2012 Summer Olympics.

== Competition record ==
Year	Competition	Venue	Position	Event	Notes
Representing Kazakhstan
2006	Asian Games	Doha, Qatar	6th	400 m	53.99
2006	Asian Games	Doha, Qatar	2nd	4×400 m relay	3:33.86
2007	Asian Championships	Amman, Jordan	6th	400 m	54.76
2007	Asian Championships	Amman, Jordan	3rd	4×400 m relay	3:50.81
2007	Universiade	Bangkok, Thailand	16th (h)	400 m	54.94
2008	Asian Indoor Championships	Doha, Qatar	2nd	400 m	53.38
2008	Asian Indoor Championships	Doha, Qatar	2nd	4×400 m relay	3:38.10
2009	Universiade	Belgrade, Serbia	6th	400 m	53.26
2009	World Championships	Berlin, Germany	29th (h)	400 m	54.38
2009	Asian Indoor Games	Hanoi, Vietnam	3rd	400 m	54.34
2009	Asian Indoor Games	Hanoi, Vietnam	1st	4×400 m relay	3:39.21
2009	Asian Championships	Kobe, Japan	5th	400 m	53.78
2009	Asian Championships	Kobe, Japan	4th	4×400 m relay	3:36.54
2010	Asian Indoor Championships	Tehran, Iran	1st	400 m	53.89
2010	Asian Indoor Championships	Tehran, Iran	2nd	4×400 m relay	3:44.20
2010	Asian Games	Guangzhou, China	3rd	400 m	52.70
2010	Asian Games	Guangzhou, China	2nd	4×400 m relay	3:30.03
2011	Asian Championships	Kobe, Japan	–	400 m	DNF
2011	World Championships	Daegu, South Korea	–	4×400 m relay	DNF
2012	Olympic Games	London, United Kingdom	34th (h)	400 m	53.66
2014	Asian Games	Incheon, South Korea	6th	4x400 m relay	3:36.83
