= Chitra Soman =

Indian athlete

Personal information
- Nationality: Indian
- Born: 10 July 1983 (age 43)

Sport
- Sport: Track and field
- Event: Sprints

Achievements and titles
- Personal bests: 200 m: 24.74 (Doha 2006); 400 m: 51.3 (Chennai 2004); 400 m hurdles: 57.70 (Ludhiana 2005)
Medal record
Women's athletics
Representing India
Asian Games
Gold medal – first place	2006 Doha	4 × 400 m relay
Asian Championships
Gold medal – first place	2005 Incheon	4 × 400 m relay
Gold medal – first place	2007 Amman	400 m
Gold medal – first place	2007 Amman	4 × 400 m relay
Silver medal – second place	2009 Guangzhou	4 × 400 m relay
Asian Indoor Championships
Gold medal – first place	2008 Doha	4 × 400 m relay
Commonwealth Games
Silver medal – second place	2006 Melbourne	4 × 400 m relay

Chitra Kulathummuriyil Soman (born 10 July 1983) is an Indian athlete. She was born in Mattakkara, Kottayam, Kerala. Her father is from Kottayam and her mother is from kanjirappally, Kerala. She is a sprinter who specializes in the 400 metres. Soman finished seventh in 4 x 400 metres relay at the 2004 Summer Olympics, together with teammates Satti Geetha, K. M. Beenamol and Rajwinder Kaur. This team, only with Manjeet Kaur running instead of Geetha, had set a national record of 3:26.89 minutes in the heat. Soman also ran for the Indian team who won a silver medal at the 2006 Commonwealth Games. In 2007, Chitra Soman won gold medal in 400m race at Asian Grand Prix series held at Guwahati on 23 June 2007 and at Puen held on 27 June 2007. She also led Indian women 4 × 400 m relay team to Gold in Asian Athletics Championship held at Amman in July 2007. In 2008, Chitra again showed her class by leading another win for Indian women 4 × 400 m relay team in 3rd Asian Indoor Championship in Athletics held in Doha in Feb 2008.

Her personal best time in 400 m is 51.30 seconds, achieved in June 2004 in Chennai. She got married 2011 and her husband is from Punjab.

== See also ==
- List of Kerala Olympians
