= Sathi Geetha =

Indian sprint athlete (born 1983)

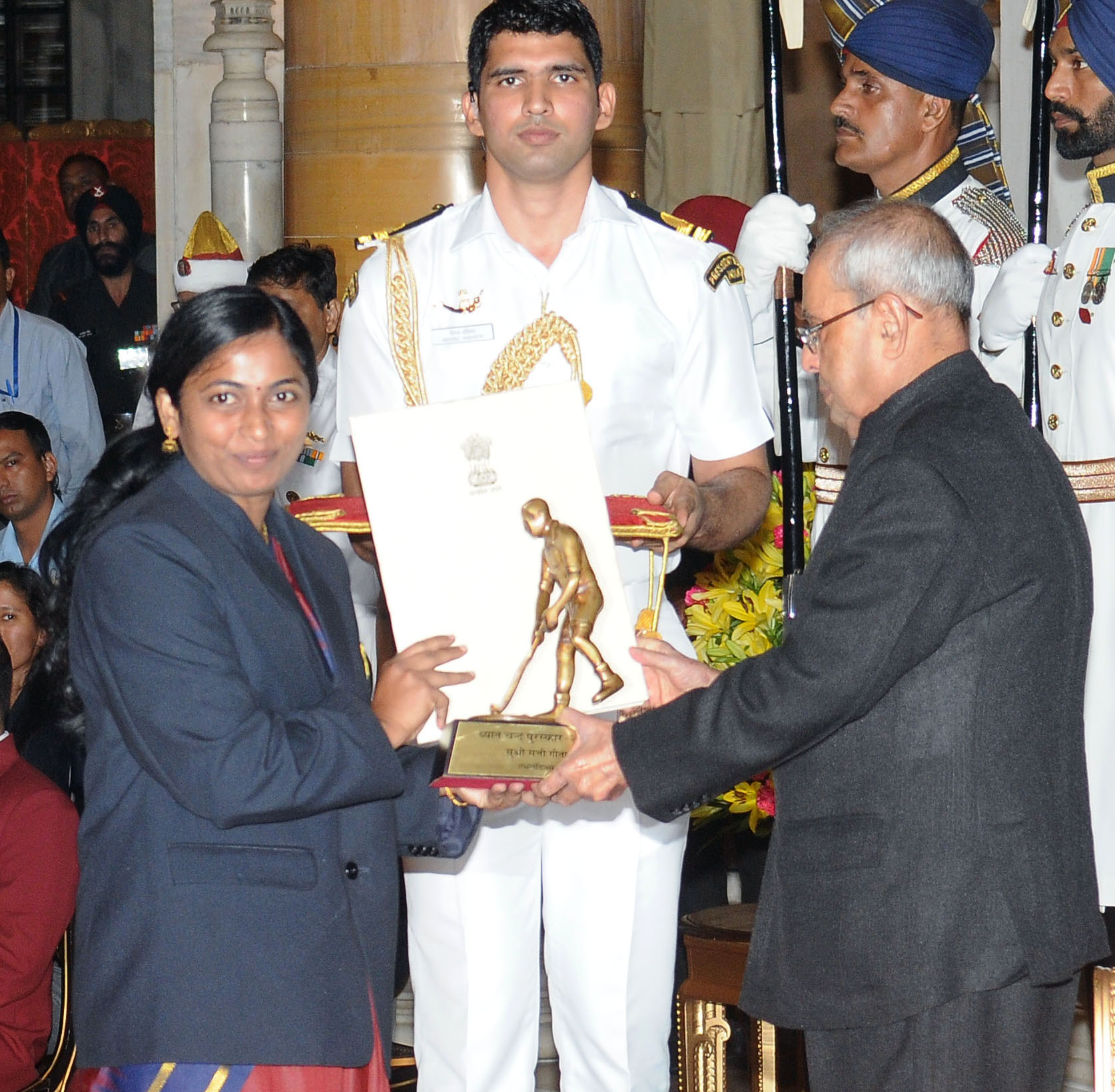
- Geetha 2016 Dhyan Chand Award

Personal information
- Nationality: India
- Born: 5 July 1983 (age 43) Maruteru, Andhra Pradesh, India.
- Height: 156 cm (5 ft 1 in)
- Weight: 52 kg (115 lb)

Sport
- Sport: Running
- College team: S V K P AND DR K S RAJU ARTS AND SCIENCE COLLEGE, PENUGOND.
Medal record
Women's athletics
Representing India
Asian Games
Gold medal – first place	2006 Doha	4×400 m
Asian Championships
Gold medal – first place	2005 Incheon	4×400 m
Silver medal – second place	2005 Incheon	400 m
Bronze medal – third place	2003 Manila	4×400 m

Sathi Geetha (born 5 July 1983) is an Indian track and field athlete from Palakollu, Andhra Pradesh. She is a sprinter specializing in the 400 metres.

Sathi Geetha was born on 5 July 1983 in Maruteru, coming from a Telugu Hindu traditional and small middle-class family.

Geetha finished seventh in 4 × 400 metres relay at the 2004 Summer Olympics, together with teammates K. M. Beenamol, Chitra K. Soman and Rajwinder Kaur. Geetha also won a silver medal at the 2005 Asian Championships in a personal best time of 51.75 seconds.

== See also ==
- List of Asian Games medalists in athletics
- List of National Sports Award recipients in athletics
