= Satomi Kubokura =

Japanese track and field athlete

Personal information
- Born: 27 April 1982 (age 44) Asahikawa, Japan
- Height: 1.61 m (5 ft 3 1/2 in)
- Weight: 52 kg (115 lb)

Sport
- Country: Japan
- Sport: Athletics
- Event: 400 metres hurdles
Medal record
Women's athletics
Representing Japan
Asian Games
Silver medal – second place	2006 Doha	400 m hurdles
Silver medal – second place	2014 Incheon	400 m hurdles
Bronze medal – third place	2010 Guangzhou	400 m hurdles
Asian Championships
Gold medal – first place	2007 Amman	400 m hurdles
Gold medal – first place	2009 Guangzhou	400 m hurdles
Gold medal – first place	2011 Kobe	400 m hurdles
Gold medal – first place	2011 Kobe	4×400 m
Gold medal – first place	2013 Pune	400 m hurdles
Silver medal – second place	2007 Amman	4×400 m
Bronze medal – third place	2005 Incheon	4×400 m
Bronze medal – third place	2009 Guangzhou	4×400 m
Bronze medal – third place	2013 Pune	4×400 m
East Asian Games
Bronze medal – third place	2005 Macau	400 m hurdles

Satomi Kubokura (久保倉 里美, Kubokura Satomi; born 27 April 1982 in Asahikawa) is a Japanese track and field athlete who competes in the 200 metres, the 400 metres and the 400 m hurdles.

Her personal bests are 24.32 in the 200 m achieved at Kobe on 27 April 2008; 38.12 in the 300 metres at Izumo on 22 April 2007; 53.08 in the 400 metres in Osaka on 30 June 2007; and 55.34 in the 400 m hurdles at Osaka on 26 June 2011.

She competed in the 400 metres hurdles at the 2008 Beijing Olympics where she qualified for the second round with the twelfth fastest overall time of 55.82 seconds.

At the 2012 Summer Olympics, she reached the semi-finals of 400 metre hurdles.

== Competition record ==
Year	Competition	Venue	Position	Event	Notes
Representing Japan
2003	Asian Championships	Manila, Philippines	8th	400 m hurdles	58.36
2005	Asian Championships	Incheon, South Korea	4th	400 m hurdles	57.23
2005	Asian Championships	Incheon, South Korea	3rd	4 × 400 m relay	3:33.54
2005	East Asian Games	Macau, China	3rd	400 m hurdles	57.38
2006	Asian Games	Doha, Qatar	2nd	400 m hurdles	56.49
2006	Asian Games	Doha, Qatar	4th	4 × 400 m relay	3:35.08
2007	Asian Championships	Amman, Jordan	1st	400 m hurdles	56.74
2007	Asian Championships	Amman, Jordan	2nd	4 × 400 m relay	3:33.82
2007	World Championships	Osaka, Japan	26th (h)	400 m hurdles	57.01
2007	World Championships	Osaka, Japan	11th (h)	4 × 400 m relay	3:30.17
2008	Olympic Games	Beijing, China	15th (sf)	400 m hurdles	56.69
2008	Olympic Games	Beijing, China	15th (h)	4 × 400 m relay	3:30.52
2009	World Championships	Berlin, Germany	24th (h)	400 m hurdles	56.91
2009	World Championships	Berlin, Germany	14th (h)	4 × 400 m relay	3:34.46
2009	Asian Championships	Guangzhou, China	1st	400 m hurdles	56.62
2009	Asian Championships	Guangzhou, China	3rd	4 × 400 m relay	3:31.95
2010	Asian Games	Guangzhou, China	3rd	400 m hurdles	56.83
2010	Asian Games	Guangzhou, China	4th	4 × 400 m relay	3:31.81
2011	Asian Championships	Kobe, Japan	1st	400 m hurdles	56.52
2011	Asian Championships	Kobe, Japan	1st	4 × 400 m relay	3:35.00
2011	World Championships	Daegu, South Korea	21st (sf)	400 m hurdles	56.87
2012	Olympic Games	London, United Kingdom	20th (sf)	400 m hurdles	56.25
2013	Asian Championships	Pune, India	1st	400 m hurdles	56.82
2013	Asian Championships	Pune, India	3rd	4 × 400 m relay	3:35.72
2013	World Championships	Moscow, Russia	17th (h)	400 m hurdles	56.33
2014	Asian Games	Incheon, South Korea	2nd	400 m hurdles	56.21
2016	Olympic Games	Rio de Janeiro, Brazil	35th (h)	400 m hurdles	57.34
