= Mandeep Kaur (sprinter) =

Indian sprinter (born 1988)

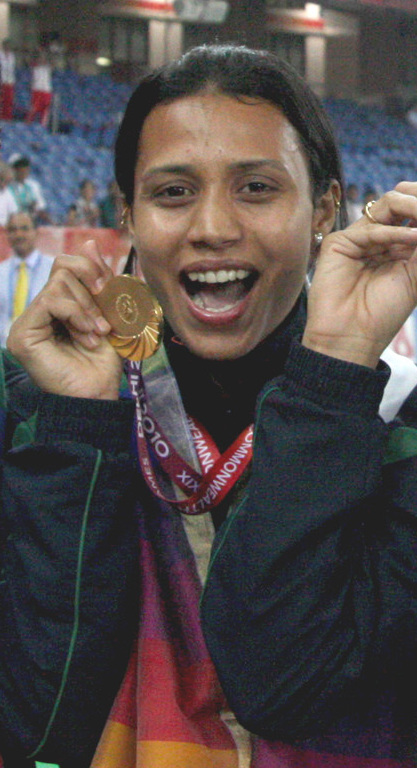
- Portrait of Mandeep Kaur

Personal information
- Born: 19 April 1988 (age 38) Jagadhri, Yamunanagar, Haryana, India
Medal record
Women's athletics
Representing India
Asian Games
| Gold medal – first place | 2010 Guangzhou | 4x400 m |
| Gold medal – first place | 2014 Incheon | 4x400 m |
Asian Championships
| Gold medal – first place | 2007 Amman | 4×400 m |
| Silver medal – second place | 2009 Guangzhou | 4×400 m |
Asian Indoor Championships
| Gold medal – first place | 2008 Doha | 4×400 m |
| Bronze medal – third place | 2008 Doha | 400 m |
Commonwealth Games
| Gold medal – first place | 2010 Delhi | 4x400 m |

Mandeep Kaur (born 19 April 1988 in Jagadhri) is an Indian athlete who mainly competes in the 400 meters. She competed at the 2008 Olympic Games, but failed to pass the first round. Mandeep Kaur won gold medals in the women's 4 x 400 metres relay events at the 2010 Commonwealth Games and the 2010 and 2014 Asian Games.

On 29 June 2011, Reuters reported that she had tested positive for the anabolic steroids methandienone and stanozolol during off-season tests, following the same day announcement of the Athletics Federation of India. She blamed the results on tainted food supplements, and denied taking any banned substance knowingly. After a total of 6 Indian female 400m runners tested positive, including Mandeep's teammates at the Commonwealth Games, Ashwini Akkunji and Sini Jose, the team coach, Ukrainian Yuri Ogrodnik, was fired by India's Sport's Minister Ajay Maken.
