= 2007 Asian Athletics Championships =

2007 Asian Championships
- Dates: July 25–29
- Host city: (Jordan) Amman
- Venue: Amman International Stadium
- Events: 44
- Participation: 34 nations

The 17th Asian Athletics Championships were held on the Amman International Stadium in Amman, Jordan between 25 July and 29 July 2007. It was moved in the last minute from original host country Lebanon due to the unrest in that country.

Countries like China did not send their best athletes, instead choosing to prepare for the 2007 World Championships which were staged a month later.

== Results ==
=== Men ===
Event	Gold		Silver		Bronze	
100 m	Samuel Francis; Qatar	9.99 AR	Masahide Ueno; Japan	10.26	Ibrahim Abdulla Al-Waleed; Qatar	10.30
200 m	Kenji Fujimitsu; Japan	20.85	Ibrahim Abdulla Al-Waleed; Qatar	20.98	Khalil Al-Hanahneh; Jordan	21.03
400 m	Prasanna Sampath Amarasekara; Sri Lanka	46.71	Reza Bouazar; Iran	46.90	Mohammad Akefian; Iran	46.93
800 m	Mohammed Obeid Al-Salhi; Saudi Arabia	1:51.73	Sajjad Moradi; Iran	1:52.22	Abubaker Ali Kamal; Qatar	1:52.22
1500 m	Mohammed Othman Shaween; Saudi Arabia	3:46.85	Sajjad Moradi; Iran	3:47.01	Abubaker Ali Kamal; Qatar	3:47.22
5000 m	Felix Kikwai Kibore; Qatar	14:07.12	Abdullah Ahmad Hassan; Qatar	14:08.66	Abedeen Isa Ishaq; Bahrain	14:18.47
10,000 m	Abdullah Ahmad Hassan; Qatar	29:45.95	Sedam Ali Dawoud; Qatar	29:58.33	Hassan Mahboob Ali; Bahrain	30:05.12
110 m h	Tasuku Tanonaka; Japan	13.51	Mohamed Issa Al-Thawadi; Qatar	13.55	Wu Youjia; China	13.68
400 m h	Yevgeniy Meleshenko; Kazakhstan	50.01	Yosuke Tsushima; Japan	50.14	Joseph Abraham; India	50.28
3000 m st.	Ali Ahmed Al-Amri; Saudi Arabia	8:40.25	Zakrya Ali Kamil; Qatar	8:40.49	Mustafa Ahmed Shebto; Qatar	8:47.99
20 km walk	Cui Zhide; China	1:30:21.30	Shin Il-yong; South Korea	1:31:33.42	Rustam Kuvatov; Kazakhstan	1:32:37.56
4 x 100 m	Thailand; Taweesak Pooltong, Wachara Sondee, Sompote Suwannarangsri, Sittichai Suwonprateep	39.34	Qatar; Saad Al-Shahwani, Samuel Francis, Areef Ibrahim Badar, Ibrahim Abdulla Al-Waleed	39.64	China; Wen Yongti, Cao Jian, Zhang Yuan, Liang Jiahong	39.71
4 x 400 m	Saudi Arabia; Yonas Al-Hosah, Mohammed Shaween, Ismail Al-Sabani, Mohammed Obeid Al-Salhi	3:05.96	Sri Lanka; Dulan Priyasu, Rohitha Pusup, Shivant Weerasuriya, Ashok Jayasundara	3:07.29	India; Sarish Paul, Joseph Abraham, Mortaja Shake, K. M. Mathew	3:07.94
High jump	Lee Hup Wei; Malaysia	2.24	Jean-Claude Rabbath; Lebanon	2.21	Satoru Kubota; Japan	2.21
Pole vault	Mohammad Mohsen Rabbani; Iran	5.35	Kim Do-kyun; South Korea	5.25	Takafumi Suzuki; Japan	5.10
Long jump	Mohamed Salman Al-Khuwalidi; Saudi Arabia	8.16w	Saleh Abdelaziz Al-Haddad; Kuwait	8.05w	Li Runrun; China	7.84w
Triple jump	Renjith Maheswary; India	17.19w	Kim Deok-hyeon; South Korea	17.00	Bibu Mathew; India	16.64w
Shot put	Navpreet Singh; India	19.70	Chang Ming-huang; Chinese Taipei	19.66	Khalid Habash Al-Suwaidi; Qatar	19.51
Discus	Ehsan Haddadi; Iran	65.38 CR	Rashid Shafi Al-Dosari; Qatar	63.49	Abbas Samimi; Iran	61.29
Hammer	Ali Al-Zinkawi; Kuwait	75.71	Dilshod Nazarov; Tajikistan	75.70	Hiroaki Doi; Japan	70.74
Javelin	Chen Qi; China	78.07	Park Jae-myong; South Korea	75.77	Jung Sang-jin; South Korea	70.95
Decathlon	Ahmad Hassan Moussa; Qatar	7678 pts	Hadi Sepehrzad; Iran	7667 pts	Pavel Andreev; Uzbekistan	7484 pts
WR world record | AR area record | CR championship record | GR games record | NR national record | OR Olympic record | PB personal best | SB season best | WL world leading (in a given season)

=== Women ===
Event	Gold		Silver		Bronze	
100 m	Susanthika Jayasinghe; Sri Lanka	11.19 w	Vu Thi Huong; Vietnam	11.33 w	Zou Yingting; China	11.54 w
200 m	Susanthika Jayasinghe; Sri Lanka	22.99	Buddika Sujani; Sri Lanka	23.28	Vu Thi Huong; Vietnam	23.30 NR
400 m	Chitra Soman; India	53.01	Asami Tanno; Japan	53.20	Menaka Wickramasinghe; Sri Lanka	54.11
800 m	Truong Thanh Hang; Vietnam	2:04.77	Sinimole Paulose; India	2:06.15	Ayako Jinnouchi; Japan	2:08.75
1500 m	Sinimole Paulose; India	4:12.69	Sara Yusuf Yaqoob Bekheet; Bahrain	4:26.21	Truong Thanh Hang; Vietnam	4:26.77
5000 m	Kareema Saleh Jasim; Bahrain	16:40.87	Preeja Sreedharan; India	16:56.16	Kim Mi-gyong; North Korea	18:21.32
10,000 m	Kareema Saleh Jasim; Bahrain	34:26.39	Preeja Sreedharan; India	36:04.54	Kim Mi-gyong; North Korea	38:29.90
100 m h	Mami Ishino; Japan	13.26	He Liyuan; China	13.31	Lee Yeon-kyung; South Korea	13.50
400 m H	Satomi Kubokura; Japan	56.74	Ruan Zhuofen; China	57.63	Galina Pedan; Kyrgyzstan	59.13
3000 m st.	Zhao Yanni; China	10:48.18	Baraah Awadallah; Jordan	12:03.04	Leila Ebrahimi; Iran	12:12.40
20 km walk	Jiang Qiuyan; China	1:36:15.9	Bai Yanmin; China	1:38:09.6	Svetlana Tolstaya; Kazakhstan	1:41:53.0
4 x 100 m	Thailand; Sangwan Jaksunin, Supavadee Khawpeag, Jutamass Tawoncharoen, Nongnuch Sanrat	44.31	Japan; Tomoko Ishida, Momoko Takahashi, Sakie Nobuoka, Saori Kitakaze	45.06	Chinese Taipei; Lin Wen-Wen, Lin Yi-chun, Chen Shu-chuan, Li Chen Yi Ru	46.48
4 x 400 m	India; Mandeep Kaur, Manjeet Kaur, Sini Jose, Chitra Soman	3:33.39	Japan; Sayaka Aoki, Satomi Kubokura, Natsumi Watanabe, Asami Tanno	3:33.82	Kazakhstan; Tatyana Khajimuradova, Margarita Matsko, Anna Gavryushenko, Marina Maslyonko	3:50.81
High jump	Tatyana Efimenko; Kyrgyzstan	1.94 =CR	Yekaterina Yevseyeva; Kazakhstan	1.91	Anna Ustinova; Kazakhstan	1.91
Pole vault	Rosalinda Samsu; Malaysia	4.20	Rachel Yang; Singapore	3.50	only two athletes cleared height	
Long jump	Olga Rypakova; Kazakhstan	6.66w	Anju Bobby George; India	6.65	Jung Soon-ok; South Korea	6.60w
Triple jump	Olga Rypakova; Kazakhstan	14.69 CR	Li Sha; China	14.03w	Irina Litvinenko; Kazakhstan	13.80w
Shot put	Liu Xiangrong; China	17.65	Lee Mi-young; South Korea	16.58	Lin Chia-Ying; Chinese Taipei	16.46
Discus	Xu Shaoyang; China	61.30	Li Yanfeng; China	61.13	Krishna Poonia; India	55.38
Hammer	Liao Xiaoyan; China	60.58	Kang Na-ru; South Korea	57.38	Huang Chi-Feng; Chinese Taipei	55.37
Javelin	Buoban Phamang; Thailand	58.35	Gim Gyeong-ae; South Korea	53.01	Nadeeka Lakmali; Sri Lanka	52.59
Heptathlon	Irina Naumenko; Kazakhstan	5617 pts	J. J. Shobha; India	5356 pts	Sushmitha Singha Roy; India	5154 pts
WR world record | AR area record | CR championship record | GR games record | NR national record | OR Olympic record | PB personal best | SB season best | WL world leading (in a given season)

== Medals table ==
* Host nation (Jordan)

Rank	Nation	Gold	Silver	Bronze	Total
1	China (CHN)	7	5	4	16
2	India (IND)	5	5	5	15
3	Saudi Arabia (KSA)	5	0	0	5
4	Qatar (QAT)	4	7	5	16
5	Japan (JPN)	4	5	4	13
6	Kazakhstan (KAZ)	4	1	5	10
7	Sri Lanka (SRI)	3	2	2	7
8	Thailand (THA)	3	0	0	3
9	Iran (IRN)	2	4	3	9
10	Bahrain (BHR)	2	1	2	5
11	Malaysia (MYS)	2	0	0	2
12	Vietnam (VNM)	1	1	2	4
13	Kuwait (KUW)	1	1	0	2
14	Kyrgyzstan (KGZ)	1	0	1	2
15	South Korea (KOR)	0	7	3	10
16	Chinese Taipei (TPE)	0	1	3	4
17	Jordan (JOR)*	0	1	1	2
18	Lebanon (LBN)	0	1	0	1
18	Singapore (SIN)	0	1	0	1
18	Tajikistan (TJK)	0	1	0	1
21	North Korea (PRK)	0	0	2	2
22	Uzbekistan (UZB)	0	0	1	1
Totals (22 entries)		44	44	43	131

== Participating nations ==
- Afghanistan
- Bahrain
- Bangladesh
- China
- Chinese Taipei
- Hong Kong
- India
- Indonesia
- Iran
- Japan
- Jordan
- Kazakhstan
- Kuwait
- Kyrgyzstan
- Lebanon
- Macau
- Malaysia
- Maldives
- Nepal
- North Korea
- Pakistan
- Palestine
- Philippines
- Qatar
- Saudi Arabia
- Singapore
- South Korea
- Sri Lanka
- Syria
- Tajikistan
- Thailand
- Uzbekistan
- Vietnam
- Yemen

== See also ==
- 2007 in athletics (track and field)
