= 2003 Asian Athletics Championships – Women's 4 × 400 metres relay =

The women's 4 × 400 metres relay event at the 2003 Asian Athletics Championships was held in Manila, Philippines on September 23.

== Results ==
Rank	Nation	Time	Notes
1st place, gold medalist(s)	China	3:31.30	
2nd place, silver medalist(s)	Kazakhstan	3:32.82	
3rd place, bronze medalist(s)	India	3:35.34	
4	Thailand	3:37.23	
5	Japan	3:38.09	
