= Tang Xiaoyin =

Chinese sprinter (born 1985)

Medal record

Women's athletics

Representing China

Asian Indoor Championships
Gold medal – first place	2012 Hangzhou	4 × 400 m
Bronze medal – third place	2012 Hangzhou	400 m

Tang Xiaoyin (simplified Chinese: 汤晓茵; traditional Chinese: 湯曉茵; pinyin: Tāng Xiǎoyīn; Cantonese: Tong1 Hiu2 Yan1; born 29 April 1985 in Guangzhou, Guangdong) is a female Chinese sprinter who specializes in the 400 metres.

She finished fourth at the 2004 World Junior Championships and won the 2007 Asian Indoor Games.

She represented her country in the 4 × 400 metres relay event at the 2008 Summer Olympics. She went on to take gold in the same relay event at the 11th Chinese National Games in 2009.

Her personal best time is 52.55 seconds, achieved in August 2006 in Shijiazhuang. In the 200 metres she has 23.61 seconds, achieved in April 2004 in Guilin.
