= Olga Tereshkova =

Kazakhstani sprinter (born 1984)

Medal record

Women's athletics

Representing Kazakhstan

Asian Championships
Silver medal – second place	2003 Manila	4×400 m
Silver medal – second place	2005 Incheon	4×400 m

Olga Tereshkova (née Tsykunova; born 26 October 1984) is a Kazakhstani former sprinter who specialized in the 400 metres.

At the age of 16, she just missed out on a medal in the 400 m at the 2001 World Youth Championships in Athletics. Following this she made a number of appearances with the 4 x 400 metres relay team, taking silver at the 2002 Asian Games. She made her first appearance on the senior world stage when she took part in the 4 x 400 relay race at the 2003 World Championships in Athletics. She won further silver relay medals at the 2005 Asian Athletics Championships and the 2006 Asian Games. She also made her first impact in the individual senior events at the Asian Games, beating Manjit Kaur to the gold in the 400 m.

She set her personal best time of 51.62 seconds at the 2007 Universiade in Bangkok. She was knocked out in the heats at the 2007 World Championships in Athletics, but she had regional success soon after, taking bronze at the 2007 Asian Indoor Games. She also won gold with the women's Kazakhstan relay team, setting an Asian Indoor Games record in the process.

She represented her country in the 400 metres race at the 2008 Beijing Olympics, but she was again knocked out at the heats stage. Tereshkova competed at the 2009 Asian Indoor Games and reached the 400 m final but did not win a medal.

== Doping ==
At the 2011 Asian Athletics Championships she won the 400 m title and the relay silver with the Kazakhstan women's team. However, she lost these medals as her drug test at the competition came back positive for excess testosterone. She received a two-year ban from the sport beginning from July 2011. On 19 March 2014 she again tested positive for an illegal substance, Methyltestosterone, and received a lifetime ban.

== Achievements ==
Year	Competition	Venue	Position	Event	Notes
Representing Kazakhstan
2001	World Youth Championships	Debrecen, Hungary	4th	400 m	53.82
2002	World Junior Championships	Kingston, Jamaica	7th (sf)	400m	53.76
2002	Asian Games	Busan, South Korea	2nd	4 × 400 m relay	3:31.72
2005	Asian Championships	Incheon, South Korea	2nd	4 × 400 m relay	3:32.61
2005	Universiade	İzmir, Turkey	6th	4 × 400 m relay	3:32.83
2006	Asian Games	Doha, Qatar	1st	400 m	51.86
2006	Asian Games	Doha, Qatar	2nd	4 × 400 m relay	3:33.86
2006	World Cup	Athens, Greece	7th	400 m	52.57
2007	Universiade	Bangkok, Thailand	1st	400 m	51.62
2011	Universiade	Shenzhen, China	Disqualified	400 m	DQ

== See also ==
- List of doping cases in athletics
