= Athletics at the Asian Games =

- Governing bodies: WA (World) / AA (Asia)
- Events: 50 (men: 24; women: 24; mixed: 2)

Games
- 1951; 1954; 1958; 1962; 1966; 1970; 1974; 1978; 1982; 1986; 1990; 1994; 1998; 2002; 2006; 2010; 2014; 2018; 2022; 2026
- Medalists; Records

Athletics is an Asian Games event since 1951 in New Delhi, India. Among major athletics tournaments of the region, it succeeded the athletics at the Far Eastern Championship Games, which had ceased to be held after 1938.

== Editions ==
Games	Year	Host city	Best nation
I	1951	New Delhi, India	Japan
II	1954	Manila, Philippines	Japan
III	1958	Tokyo, Japan	Japan
IV	1962	Jakarta, Indonesia	Japan
V	1966	Bangkok, Thailand	Japan
VI	1970	Bangkok, Thailand	Japan
VII	1974	Tehran, Iran	Japan
VIII	1978	Bangkok, Thailand	China
IX	1982	New Delhi, India	Japan
X	1986	Seoul, South Korea	China
XI	1990	Beijing, China	China
XII	1994	Hiroshima, Japan	China
XIII	1998	Bangkok, Thailand	China
XIV	2002	Busan, South Korea	China
XV	2006	Doha, Qatar	China
XVI	2010	Guangzhou, China	China
XVII	2014	Incheon, South Korea	China
XVIII	2018	Jakarta–Palembang, Indonesia	China
XIX	2022	Hangzhou, China	China
XX	2026	Aichi–Nagoya, Japan	China

== Events ==
=== Men's events ===
Event	51	54	58	62	66	70	74	78	82	86	90	94	98	02	06	10	14	18	Games
100 m	•	•	•	•	•	•	•	•	•	•	•	•	•	•	•	•	•	•	18
200 m	•	•	•	•	•	•	•	•	•	•	•	•	•	•	•	•	•	•	18
400 m	•	•	•	•	•	•	•	•	•	•	•	•	•	•	•	•	•	•	18
800 m	•	•	•	•	•	•	•	•	•	•	•	•	•	•	•	•	•	•	18
1500 m	•	•	•	•	•	•	•	•	•	•	•	•	•	•	•	•	•	•	18
5000 m	•	•	•	•	•	•	•	•	•	•	•	•	•	•	•	•	•	•	18
10000 m	•	•	•	•	•	•	•	•	•	•	•	•	•	•	•	•	•	•	18
Marathon	•		•	•	•	•		•	•	•	•	•	•	•	•	•	•	•	16
110 m hurdles	•	•	•	•	•	•	•	•	•	•	•	•	•	•	•	•	•	•	18
400 m hurdles	•	•	•	•	•	•	•	•	•	•	•	•	•	•	•	•	•	•	18
3000 m steeplechase	•	•	•	•	•	•	•	•	•	•	•	•	•	•	•	•	•	•	18
High jump	•	•	•	•	•	•	•	•	•	•	•	•	•	•	•	•	•	•	18
Pole vault	•	•	•	•	•	•	•	•	•	•	•	•	•	•	•	•	•	•	18
Long jump	•	•	•	•	•	•	•	•	•	•	•	•	•	•	•	•	•	•	18
Triple jump	•	•	•	•	•	•	•	•	•	•	•	•	•	•	•	•	•	•	18
Shot put	•	•	•	•	•	•	•	•	•	•	•	•	•	•	•	•	•	•	18
Discus throw	•	•	•	•	•	•	•	•	•	•	•	•	•	•	•	•	•	•	18
Hammer throw	•	•	•	•	•	•	•	•	•	•	•	•	•	•	•	•	•	•	18
Javelin throw	•	•	•	•	•	•	•	•	•	•	•	•	•	•	•	•	•	•	18
Decathlon	•	•	•	•	•	•	•	•	•	•	•	•	•	•	•	•	•	•	18
10 km walk	•																		1
20 km walk								•	•	•	•	•	•	•	•	•	•	•	11
50 km walk	•								•		•	•	•			•	•	•	8
4 × 100 m relay	•	•	•	•	•	•	•	•	•	•	•	•	•	•	•	•	•	•	18
4 × 400 m relay	•	•	•	•	•	•	•	•	•	•	•	•	•	•	•	•	•	•	18
Events	24	21	22	22	22	22	21	23	24	23	24	24	24	23	23	24	24	24	

=== Women's events ===
Event	51	54	58	62	66	70	74	78	82	86	90	94	98	02	06	10	14	18	Games
100 m	•	•	•	•	•	•	•	•	•	•	•	•	•	•	•	•	•	•	18
200 m	•	•	•	•	•	•	•	•	•	•	•	•	•	•	•	•	•	•	18
400 m					•	•	•	•	•	•	•	•	•	•	•	•	•	•	14
800 m				•	•	•	•	•	•	•	•	•	•	•	•	•	•	•	15
1500 m						•	•	•	•	•	•	•	•	•	•	•	•	•	13
3000 m								•	•	•	•	•							5
5000 m													•	•	•	•	•	•	6
10000 m										•	•	•	•	•	•	•	•	•	9
Marathon										•	•	•	•	•	•	•	•	•	9
80 m hurdles	•	•	•	•	•														5
100 m hurdles						•	•	•	•	•	•	•	•	•	•	•	•	•	13
400 m hurdles								•	•	•	•	•	•	•	•	•	•	•	11
3000 m steeplechase																•	•	•	3
High jump	•	•	•	•	•	•	•	•	•	•	•	•	•	•	•	•	•	•	18
Pole vault													•	•	•	•	•	•	6
Long jump	•	•	•	•	•	•	•	•	•	•	•	•	•	•	•	•	•	•	18
Triple jump													•	•	•	•	•	•	6
Shot put	•	•	•	•	•	•	•	•	•	•	•	•	•	•	•	•	•	•	18
Discus throw	•	•	•	•	•	•	•	•	•	•	•	•	•	•	•	•	•	•	18
Hammer throw														•	•	•	•	•	5
Javelin throw	•	•	•	•	•	•	•	•	•	•	•	•	•	•	•	•	•	•	18
Pentathlon					•	•	•	•											4
Heptathlon									•	•	•	•	•	•	•	•	•	•	10
10 km walk										•	•	•	•						4
20 km walk														•	•	•	•	•	5
4 × 100 m relay	•	•	•	•	•	•	•	•	•	•	•	•	•	•	•	•	•	•	18
4 × 400 m relay							•	•	•	•	•	•	•	•	•	•	•	•	12
Events	9	9	9	10	12	13	14	16	16	19	19	19	21	22	22	23	23	23	

== Medal table ==
Rank	Nation	Gold	Silver	Bronze	Total
1	China (CHN)	199	179	123	501
2	Japan (JPN)	196	228	179	603
3	India (IND)	85	102	96	283
4	Bahrain (BRN)	43	19	23	85
5	South Korea (KOR)	34	37	60	131
6	Qatar (QAT)	30	22	22	74
7	Kazakhstan (KAZ)	23	23	27	73
8	Saudi Arabia (KSA)	19	7	9	35
9	Pakistan (PAK)	14	13	13	40
10	Uzbekistan (UZB)	13	19	15	47
11	Thailand (THA)	13	16	22	51
12	Iran (IRI)	13	16	10	39
13	Philippines (PHI)	13	10	31	54
14	Sri Lanka (SRI)	11	7	13	31
15	Israel (ISR)	11	3	5	19
16	Malaysia (MAS)	8	8	22	38
17	Chinese Taipei (TPE)	7	20	27	54
18	North Korea (PRK)	6	6	11	23
19	Iraq (IRQ)	5	5	5	15
20	Indonesia (INA)	4	3	15	22
21	Singapore (SGP)	3	8	9	20
22	Tajikistan (TJK)	3	1	0	4
23	Kuwait (KUW)	2	5	5	12
23	Vietnam (VIE)	2	5	5	12
25	Kyrgyzstan (KGZ)	2	3	3	8
26	Myanmar (MYA)	1	3	6	10
27	Oman (OMA)	1	0	4	5
28	Syria (SYR)	1	0	1	2
28	United Arab Emirates (UAE)	1	0	1	2
30	Lebanon (LBN)	1	0	0	1
31	Mongolia (MGL)	0	1	0	1
32	Hong Kong (HKG)	0	0	4	4
33	Turkmenistan (TKM)	0	0	1	1
Totals (33 entries)		764	769	767	2,300

== See also ==
- International athletics championships and games
- List of Asian Games records in athletics
