= Athletics at the 2006 Asian Games =

- Venue: Doha Corniche; Khalifa International Stadium
- Dates: 7–12 December 2006
- Competitors: 530 from 41 nations

An Athletics competition was contested at the 2006 Asian Games in Doha, Qatar from December 7 to December 12. Twenty-three events were contested for the men while 22 were on the slate for the women. Only the 3000 Meter Steeplechase was not contested for by the women. All track and field events were held at Khalifa International Stadium, and the racewalking and marathon took place at the Doha Corniche. A total of 530 athletes (comprising 331 men and 199 women) from 41 nations took part in the competition. Bhutan, Brunei, Indonesia and Myanmar were the only nations without a representative in the events.

== Schedule ==
●	1st day	●	Final day	H	Heats	Q	Qualification	S	Semifinals	F	Final

Event↓/Date →	7th Thu	8th Fri	9th Sat		10th Sun	11th Mon	12th Tue
Men's 100 m		H	S	F			
Men's 200 m					H	F	
Men's 400 m		H			F		
Men's 800 m			H			F	
Men's 1500 m		H			F		
Men's 5000 m							F
Men's 10,000 m			F				
Men's 110 m hurdles						H	F
Men's 400 m hurdles			H		F		
Men's 3000 m steeplechase		F					
Men's 4 × 100 m relay						H	F
Men's 4 × 400 m relay							F
Men's marathon					F		
Men's 20 km walk	F						
Men's high jump			F				
Men's pole vault					F		
Men's long jump		Q	F				
Men's triple jump							F
Men's shot put						F	
Men's discus throw					F		
Men's hammer throw		F					
Men's javelin throw							F
Men's decathlon					●	●	
Women's 100 m		H	F				
Women's 200 m					H	F	
Women's 400 m			H		F		
Women's 800 m		H	F				
Women's 1500 m							F
Women's 5000 m						F	
Women's 10,000 m		F					
Women's 100 m hurdles					F		
Women's 400 m hurdles					F		
Women's 4 × 100 m relay							F
Women's 4 × 400 m relay							F
Women's marathon			F				
Women's 20 km walk	F						
Women's high jump						F	
Women's pole vault							F
Women's long jump					F		
Women's triple jump						F	
Women's shot put			F				
Women's discus throw						F	
Women's hammer throw		F					
Women's javelin throw			F				
Women's heptathlon		●	●				

== Medalists ==
=== Men ===
Event	Gold		Silver		Bronze	
100 m	Yahya Habeeb; Saudi Arabia	10.32	Naoki Tsukahara; Japan	10.34	Wachara Sondee; Thailand	10.39
200 m	Shingo Suetsugu; Japan	20.60	Yang Yaozu; China	20.71	Shinji Takahira; Japan	20.81
400 m	Hamdan Al-Bishi; Saudi Arabia	45.64	Brandon Simpson; Bahrain	45.68	Fawzi Al-Shammari; Kuwait	46.35
800 m	Yusuf Saad Kamel; Bahrain	1:45.74	Mohammad Al-Azemi; Kuwait	1:46.25	Ehsan Mohajer Shojaei; Iran	1:47.43
1500 m	Daham Najim Bashir; Qatar	3:38.06; GR	Belal Mansoor Ali; Bahrain	3:38.08	Rashid Ramzi; Bahrain	3:38.91
5000 m	James Kwalia; Qatar	13:38.90	Mushir Salem Jawher; Bahrain	13:41.10	Sultan Khamis Zaman; Qatar	13:45.91
10,000 m	Hasan Mahboob; Bahrain	27:58.88; GR	Essa Ismail Rashed; Qatar	27:59.15	Aadam Ismaeel Khamis; Bahrain	28:02.08
110 m hurdles	Liu Xiang; China	13.15; GR	Shi Dongpeng; China	13.28	Masato Naito; Japan	13.60
400 m hurdles	Kenji Narisako; Japan	48.78	Meng Yan; China	49.26	Naohiro Kawakita; Japan	50.19
3000 m steeplechase	Tareq Mubarak Taher; Bahrain	8:26.85; GR	Gamal Belal Salem; Qatar	8:29.10	Lin Xiangqian; China	8:30.49
4 × 100 m relay	Thailand; Seksan Wongsala; Wachara Sondee; Ekkachai Janthana; Sittichai Suwonprateep	39.21	Japan; Naoki Tsukahara; Shingo Suetsugu; Yusuke Omae; Shinji Takahira	39.21	China; Wen Yongyi; Pang Guibin; Yang Yaozu; Hu Kai	39.62
4 × 400 m relay	Saudi Arabia; Ismail Al-Sabiani; Hamed Al-Bishi; Mohammed Al-Salhi; Hamdan Al-Bishi	3:05.31	India; Aboo Backer; Joseph Abraham; Bhupinder Singh; K. M. Binu	3:06.65	Sri Lanka; Rohan Pradeep Kumara; Rohitha Pushpakumara; Prasanna Amarasekara; Ashoka Jayasundara	3:06.97
Marathon	Mubarak Hassan Shami; Qatar	2:12:44	Khalid Kamal Yaseen; Bahrain	2:15:36	Satoshi Osaki; Japan	2:15:36
20 km walk	Han Yucheng; China	1:21:41	Kim Hyun-sub; South Korea	1:23:12	Koichiro Morioka; Japan	1:23:17
High jump	Jean-Claude Rabbath; Lebanon	2.23	Sergey Zasimovich; Kazakhstan	2.23	Naoyuki Daigo; Japan	2.23
Pole vault	Daichi Sawano; Japan	5.60	Leonid Andreev; Uzbekistan	5.55	Yang Yansheng; China	5.50
Long jump	Hussein Al-Sabee; Saudi Arabia	8.02	Saleh Al-Haddad; Kuwait	7.88	Ahmed Faiz; Saudi Arabia	7.85
Triple jump	Li Yanxi; China	17.06	Roman Valiyev; Kazakhstan	16.98	Kim Deok-hyeon; South Korea	16.87
Shot put	Sultan Al-Hebshi; Saudi Arabia	20.42; GR	Khalid Habash Al-Suwaidi; Qatar	20.05	Chang Ming-huang; Chinese Taipei	19.45
Discus throw	Ehsan Haddadi; Iran	63.79	Rashid Shafi Al-Dosari; Qatar	62.11	Sultan Al-Dawoodi; Saudi Arabia	60.82
Hammer throw	Dilshod Nazarov; Tajikistan	74.43	Ali Al-Zenkawi; Kuwait	73.14	Hiroaki Doi; Japan	69.45
Javelin throw	Park Jae-myong; South Korea	79.30	Yukifumi Murakami; Japan	78.15	Li Rongxiang; China	76.13
Decathlon	Dmitriy Karpov; Kazakhstan	8384; GR	Vitaliy Smirnov; Uzbekistan	7769	Kim Kun-woo; South Korea	7665

=== Women ===
Event	Gold		Silver		Bronze	
100 m	Guzel Khubbieva; Uzbekistan	11.27	Susanthika Jayasinghe; Sri Lanka	11.34	Ruqaya Al-Ghasra; Bahrain	11.40
200 m	Ruqaya Al-Ghasra; Bahrain	23.19	Guzel Khubbieva; Uzbekistan	23.30	Susanthika Jayasinghe; Sri Lanka	23.42
400 m	Olga Tereshkova; Kazakhstan	51.86	Manjeet Kaur; India	52.17	Asami Tanno; Japan	53.04
800 m	Maryam Yusuf Jamal; Bahrain	2:01.79	Viktoriya Yalovtseva; Kazakhstan	2:03.19	Zamira Amirova; Uzbekistan	2:03.56
1500 m	Maryam Yusuf Jamal; Bahrain	4:08.63	Yuriko Kobayashi; Japan	4:14.96	Sinimole Paulose; India	4:15.09
5000 m	Xue Fei; China	15:40.12	Kayo Sugihara; Japan	15:40.87	O. P. Jaisha; India	15:41.91
10,000 m	Kayoko Fukushi; Japan	31:29.38	Kareema Saleh Jasim; Bahrain	32:17.14	Hiromi Ominami; Japan	32:18.02
100 m hurdles	Liu Jing; China	12.93	Feng Yun; China	13.10	Lee Yeon-kyung; South Korea	13.23
400 m hurdles	Huang Xiaoxiao; China	55.41	Satomi Kubokura; Japan	56.49	Noraseela Mohd Khalid; Malaysia	56.85
4 × 100 m relay	China; Wang Jing; Chen Jue; Han Ling; Qin Wangping	44.33	Japan; Tomoko Ishida; Momoko Takahashi; Takarako Nakamura; Sakie Nobuoka	44.87	Chinese Taipei; Lin Yi-chun; Chuang Shu-chuan; Chen Ying-ru; Yu Sheue-an	45.86
4 × 400 m relay	India; Sathi Geetha; Pinki Pramanik; Chitra Soman; Manjeet Kaur	3:32.95	Kazakhstan; Marina Maslyonko; Viktoriya Yalovtseva; Tatyana Azarova; Olga Tereshkova	3:33.86	China; Han Ling; Huang Xiaoxiao; Tang Xiaoyin; Li Xueji	3:33.92
Marathon	Zhou Chunxiu; China	2:27:03	Kiyoko Shimahara; Japan	2:30:34	Kayoko Obata; Japan	2:30:38
20 km walk	Liu Hong; China	1:32:19; GR	Ryoko Sakakura; Japan	1:33:19	He Dan; China	1:34:24
High jump	Marina Aitova; Kazakhstan	1.93	Tatyana Efimenko; Kyrgyzstan	1.91	Shared silver	
High jump	Marina Aitova; Kazakhstan	1.93	Zheng Xingjuan; China	1.91	Shared silver	
Pole vault	Gao Shuying; China	4.30	Roslinda Samsu; Malaysia	4.30	Ikuko Nishikori; Japan	4.15
Pole vault	Gao Shuying; China	4.30	Roslinda Samsu; Malaysia	4.30	Zhao Yingying; China	4.15
Long jump	Kumiko Ikeda; Japan	6.81	Anju Bobby George; India	6.52	Olga Rypakova; Kazakhstan	6.49
Triple jump	Xie Limei; China	14.37; GR	Anastasiya Juravleva; Uzbekistan	14.26	Li Qian; China	13.78
Shot put	Li Ling; China	18.42	Li Meiju; China	18.08	Lin Chia-ying; Chinese Taipei	16.70
Discus throw	Song Aimin; China	63.52	Ma Xuejun; China	62.43	Krishna Poonia; India	61.53
Hammer throw	Zhang Wenxiu; China	74.15; AR	Gu Yuan; China	65.13	Masumi Aya; Japan	62.67
Javelin throw	Buoban Pamang; Thailand	61.31; GR	Ma Ning; China	57.53	Yuki Ebihara; Japan	57.47
Heptathlon	Olga Rypakova; Kazakhstan	5955	Soma Biswas; India	5675	J. J. Shobha; India	5662

== Medal table ==
Rank	Nation	Gold	Silver	Bronze	Total
1	China (CHN)	14	9	8	31
2	Bahrain (BRN)	6	5	3	14
3	Japan (JPN)	5	9	13	27
4	Saudi Arabia (KSA)	5	0	2	7
5	Kazakhstan (KAZ)	4	4	1	9
6	Qatar (QAT)	3	4	1	8
7	Thailand (THA)	2	0	1	3
8	India (IND)	1	4	4	9
9	Uzbekistan (UZB)	1	4	1	6
10	South Korea (KOR)	1	1	3	5
11	Iran (IRI)	1	0	1	2
12	Lebanon (LIB)	1	0	0	1
12	Tajikistan (TJK)	1	0	0	1
14	Kuwait (KUW)	0	3	1	4
15	Sri Lanka (SRI)	0	1	2	3
16	Malaysia (MAS)	0	1	1	2
17	Kyrgyzstan (KGZ)	0	1	0	1
18	Chinese Taipei (TPE)	0	0	3	3
Totals (18 entries)		45	46	45	136

== Participating nations ==
A total of 530 athletes from 41 nations competed in athletics at the 2006 Asian Games:

- Afghanistan (1)
- Bahrain (21)
- Bangladesh (3)
- Cambodia (2)
- China (52)
- Chinese Taipei (20)
- Hong Kong (9)
- India (31)
- Iran (14)
- Iraq (5)
- Japan (56)
- Jordan (3)
- Kazakhstan (25)
- Kuwait (22)
- Kyrgyzstan (10)
- Laos (1)
- Lebanon (5)
- Macau (5)
- Malaysia (5)
- Maldives (2)
- Mongolia (4)
- Nepal (2)
- North Korea (4)
- Oman (12)
- Pakistan (4)
- Palestine (4)
- Philippines (11)
- Qatar (34)
- Saudi Arabia (28)
- Singapore (1)
- South Korea (34)
- Sri Lanka (31)
- Syria (5)
- Tajikistan (6)
- Thailand (26)
- Timor-Leste (2)
- Turkmenistan (2)
- United Arab Emirates (5)
- Uzbekistan (8)
- Vietnam (12)
- Yemen (3)
