= Doping at the Asian Games =

Banned athletes at Asian Games

What follows is a list of all the athletes that have tested positive for a banned substance either during or before an Asian Games in which they competed. Any medals listed were revoked.

== Asian Games ==
=== 1974 Tehran ===
Name	NOC	Sport	Banned substance	Medals	Ref
Oh Han-nam	South Korea	Volleyball		(silver) (Men)	
Masushi Ouchi	Japan	Weightlifting	Stimulant	(gold) (Men's 90 kg); (gold) (Men's snatch 90 kg); (silver) (Men's clean & jerk 90 kg)	
Kim Joong-iI	North Korea	Weightlifting	Stimulant	(gold) (Men's 110 kg); (gold) (Men's snatch 110 kg); (gold) (Men's clean & jerk 110 kg)	

=== 1994 Hiroshima ===
Name	NOC	Sport	Banned substance	Medals	Ref
Han Qing	China	Athletics	Dihydrotestosterone	(gold) (Women's 400 m hurdles)	
Zhang Lei	China	Canoeing	Dihydrotestosterone	(gold) (Men's C-1 500 m); (gold) (Men's C-1 1000 m); (silver) (Men's C-2 500 m)	
Qiu Suoren	China	Canoeing	Dihydrotestosterone	(silver) (Men's C-2 1000 m)	
Wang Yan	China	Cycling	Dihydrotestosterone	(gold) (Women's sprint)	
Sirisak Kadalee	Thailand	Football	Stimulant		
Fu Yong	China	Swimming	Dihydrotestosterone	(bronze) (Men's 400 m individual medley)	
Hu Bin	China	Swimming	Dihydrotestosterone	(gold) (Men's 50 m freestyle)	
Lü Bin	China	Swimming	Dihydrotestosterone	(gold) (Women's 50 m freestyle); (gold) (Women's 200 m freestyle); (gold) (Women's 200 m individual medley); (gold) (Women's 4 × 100 m freestyle relay); (silver) (Women's 100 m freestyle); (silver) (Women's 100 m backstroke)	
Xiong Guoming	China	Swimming	Dihydrotestosterone	(gold) (Men's 200 m freestyle); (gold) (Men's 200 m individual medley); (gold) (Men's 400 m individual medley); (gold) (Men's 4 × 200 m freestyle relay); (silver) (Men's 4 × 100 m freestyle relay)	
Yang Aihua	China	Swimming	Dihydrotestosterone	(silver) (Women's 400 m freestyle)	
Zhang Bin	China	Swimming	Dihydrotestosterone	(gold) (Men's 200 m butterfly)	
Zhou Guanbin	China	Swimming	Dihydrotestosterone	(gold) (Women's 400 m freestyle); (silver) (Women's 800 m freestyle)	

=== 1998 Bangkok ===
Name	NOC	Sport	Banned substance	Medals	Ref
Abdullah Sabt Ghulam	United Arab Emirates	Athletics	Ephedrine		
Fakhruddin Abdulmajid	United Arab Emirates	Karate	Ephedrine	(silver) (Men's kumite 75 kg)	
Ayed Khawaldeh	Jordan	Weightlifting	Triamterene		
Jaber Al-Ajmi	Kuwait	Weightlifting	Nandrolone		

=== 2002 Busan ===
Name	NOC	Sport	Banned substance	Medals	Ref
Youssef El-Zein	Lebanon	Bodybuilding	Missed the test	(bronze) (Men's +90 kg)	

=== 2006 Doha ===
Name	NOC	Sport	Banned substance	Medals	Ref
Santhi Soundarajan	India	Athletics	Male hormone	(silver) (Women's 800 m)	
Sayed Faisal Husain	Bahrain	Bodybuilding		(silver) (Men's 70 kg)	
Faez Abdul-Hassan	Iraq	Bodybuilding	Nandrolone		
Kim Myong-hun	South Korea	Bodybuilding		(silver) (Men's 90 kg)	
Salem Ghanem Al-Shamsi	United Arab Emirates	Bodybuilding			
Kyi Kyi Than	Myanmar	Weightlifting	Diuretic		
Mya Sanda Oo	Myanmar	Weightlifting	Metabolite	(silver) (Women's 75 kg)	
Elmira Ramileva	Uzbekistan	Weightlifting	Stanozolol		
Aleksandr Urinov	Uzbekistan	Weightlifting	Cannabis		

=== 2010 Guangzhou ===
Name	NOC	Sport	Banned substance	Medals	Ref
Suresh Sathya	India	Athletics	Nandrolone		
Ahmed Dheeb	Qatar	Athletics	Testosterone	(silver) (Men's discus throw)	
Abdelnasser Awajna	Palestine	Athletics	Norandrosterone		
Shokir Muminov	Uzbekistan	Judo	Methylhexanamine	(silver) (Men's 81 kg)	
Jakhongir Muminov	Uzbekistan	Wrestling	Methylhexanamine		

=== 2014 Incheon ===
Name	NOC	Sport	Banned substance	Medals	Ref
Betlhem Desalegn	United Arab Emirates	Athletics	Biological passport abnormalities		
Khurshed Beknazarov	Tajikistan	Football	Methylhexanamine		
Nouraddin Al-Kurdi	Syria	Karate	Clenbuterol		
Yi Sophany	Cambodia	Soft tennis	Sibutramine		
Park Tae-hwan	South Korea	Swimming	Nebido	(silver) (Men's 100 m freestyle); (bronze) (Men's 200 m freestyle); (bronze) (Men's 400 m freestyle); (bronze) (Men's 4 × 100 m freestyle relay); (bronze) (Men's 4 × 200 m freestyle relay); (bronze) (Men's 4 × 100 m medley relay)	
Mohammed Jasim	Iraq	Weightlifting	Etiocholanolone		
Tai Cheau Xuen	Malaysia	Wushu	Sibutramine	(gold) (Women's nanquan & nandao)	

=== 2018 Jakarta–Palembang ===
Name	NOC	Sport	Banned substance	Medals	Ref
Kemi Adekoya	Bahrain	Athletics	Stanozolol	(gold) (Women's 400 m hurdles); (gold) (Mixed 4 × 400 m relay)	
Hassan Chani	Bahrain	Athletics	Biological passport abnormalities	(gold) (Men's 10,000 m)	
Sanjivani Jadhav	India	Athletics	Probenecid		
Nirmala Sheoran	India	Athletics	Drostanolone & Metenolone		
Kim Hye-song	North Korea	Athletics	Methylprednisolone	(bronze) (Women's marathon)	
Nursultan Alymkulov	Kyrgyzstan	Ju-jitsu	Metandienone & GW501516	(silver) (Men's ne-waza 77 kg)	
Kumush Yuldashova	Uzbekistan	Kurash	Stanozolol	(gold) (Women's 78 kg)	
Pürevdorjiin Orkhon	Mongolia	Wrestling	Stanozolol	(gold) (Women's freestyle 62 kg)	
Rüstem Nazarow	Turkmenistan	Wrestling	Furosemide		

=== 2022 Hangzhou ===
Name	NOC	Sport	Banned substance	Medals	Ref
Yousef Al-Asiri	Saudi Arabia	Athletics	Darbepoetin		
Wesam Al-Farsi	Saudi Arabia	Athletics	Darbepoetin		
Sami Bzai	Jordan	Basketball	DHCMT	(silver) (Men)	
Justin Brownlee	Philippines	Basketball	THC	(gold) (Men)	
Mohammad Khaibar Nooristani	Afghanistan	Boxing	19-Norandrosterone & Clostebol		
Parveen Hooda	India	Boxing	Whereabouts failure	(bronze) (Women's 57 kg)	
Baatarsükhiin Chinzorig	Mongolia	Boxing	Metandienone	(gold) (Men's 63.5 kg)	
Ariana Evangelista	Philippines	Cycling	Erythropoietin		
Bilal Al-Saadi	Qatar	Cycling	Erythropoietin		
Aleksey Fomovskiy	Uzbekistan	Cycling	Anabolic steroids		
Adil Hussain	Pakistan	Kabaddi	19-Norandrosterone	(bronze) (Men)	
Tejen Tejenow	Turkmenistan	Kurash	DHCMT & Methasterone	(silver) (Men's +90 kg)	
Buyandelgeriin Erdenezul	Mongolia	Weightlifting	Drostanolone		

== See also ==
- Doping at the Olympics
