= Athletics at the 2006 Asian Games – Women's 20 kilometres walk =

Women's 20 kilometres walk at the 2006 Asian Games
- Venue: Doha Corniche
- Date: 7 December 2006
- Competitors: 7 from 6 nations

Medalists
| gold medal | Liu Hong | China |
| silver medal | Ryoko Sakakura | Japan |
| bronze medal | He Dan | China |

The women's 20 kilometres walk competition at the 2006 Asian Games in Doha, Qatar was held on 7 December 2006 at the Race Walks Street Circuit.

== Schedule ==
All times are Arabia Standard Time (UTC+03:00)

| Date | Time | Event |
|---|---|---|
| Thursday, 7 December 2006 | 10:30 | Final |

== Records ==
Prior to this competition, the existing world, Asian and Games records were as follows.

| World Record | Olimpiada Ivanova (RUS) | 1:25:41 | Helsinki, Finland | 7 August 2005 |
| Asian Record | Wang Yan (CHN) | 1:26:22 | Guangzhou, China | 19 December 2001 |
| Games Record | Wang Qingqing (CHN) | 1:33:40 | Busan, South Korea | 7 October 2002 |

== Results ==
| Rank | Athlete | Time | Notes |
|---|---|---|---|
| 1st place, gold medalist(s) | Liu Hong (CHN) | 1:32:19 | GR |
| 2nd place, silver medalist(s) | Ryoko Sakakura (JPN) | 1:33:19 | |
| 3rd place, bronze medalist(s) | He Dan (CHN) | 1:34:24 | |
| 4 | Svetlana Tolstaya (KAZ) | 1:37:05 | |
| 5 | Kim Mi-jung (KOR) | 1:37:38 | |
| 6 | Voloojiin Otgontuul (MGL) | 1:45:51 | |
| 7 | Geetha Nandani (SRI) | 1:51:41 | |
