= Athletics at the 2006 Asian Games – Women's 5000 metres =

Women's 5000 metres at the 2006 Asian Games
- Venue: Khalifa International Stadium
- Dates: 11 December 2006
- Competitors: 10 from 9 nations

Medalists
gold medal	Xue Fei	China
silver medal	Kayo Sugihara	Japan
bronze medal	O. P. Jaisha	India

The women's 5000 metres competition at the 2006 Asian Games in Doha, Qatar was held on 11 December 2006 at the Khalifa International Stadium.

== Schedule ==
All times are Arabia Standard Time (UTC+03:00)

Date	Time	Event
Monday, 11 December 2006	17:30	Final

== Records ==
Prior to this competition, the existing world, Asian and Games records were as follows.

World Record	Meseret Defar (ETH)	14:24.53	New York City, United States	3 June 2006
Asian Record	Jiang Bo (CHN)	14:28.09	Shanghai, China	23 October 1997
Games Record	Sun Yingjie (CHN)	14:40.41	Busan, South Korea	12 October 2002

== Results ==
Legend

- DNS — Did not start

Rank	Athlete	Time	Notes
1st place, gold medalist(s)	Xue Fei (CHN)	15:40.12	
2nd place, silver medalist(s)	Kayo Sugihara (JPN)	15:40.87	
3rd place, bronze medalist(s)	O. P. Jaisha (IND)	15:41.91	
4	Nadia El-Jafini (BRN)	15:45.43	
5	Preeja Sreedharan (IND)	15:51.89	
6	Park Ho-sun (KOR)	16:34.45	
7	Mercedita Manipol (PHI)	17:05.84	
8	Dalugoda Inoka (SRI)	17:26.58	
9	Iman Al-Jallad (SYR)	17:59.76	
—	Kanchhi Maya Koju (NEP)	DNS	
