= Svetlana Tolstaya =

Kazakhstani racewalker

Medal record

Women's athletics

Representing Kazakhstan

Asian Championships
Bronze medal – third place	2005 Incheon	20 km walk
Bronze medal – third place	2007 Amman	20 km walk

Svetlana Nikolayevna Tolstaya-Akimzhanova (Russian: Светлана Николаевна Толстая-Акимжанова; born 9 August 1971) is a Kazakhstani race walker. She was born in Alma-ata, Kazakh SSR, Soviet Union (now Almaty, Kazakhstan).

== Achievements ==
Year	Competition	Venue	Position	Event	Notes
Representing Kazakhstan
1996	Olympic Games	Atlanta, United States	21st	10 km	45:35
1997	World Race Walking Cup	Poděbrady, Czech Republic	37th	10 km	45:09
1997	East Asian Games	Busan, South Korea	2nd	10,000 m	47:08.09
1997	World Championships	Athens, Greece	13th	10,000 m	47:09.51
1998	Asian Games	Bangkok, Thailand	3rd	10,000 m	45:29.95
1999	World Race Walking Cup	Mézidon-Canon, France	17th	20 km	1:31:46
1999	World Championships	Seville, Spain	19th	20 km	1:35:54
2000	Olympic Games	Sydney, Australia	21st	20 km	1:34:43
2001	World Championships	Edmonton, Canada	–	20 km	DQ
2002	Asian Games	Busan, South Korea	3rd	20 km	1:35:03
2003	World Championships	Paris, France	22nd	20 km	1:35:11
2004	World Race Walking Cup	Naumburg, Germany	54th	20 km	1:37:09
2004	Olympic Games	Athens, Greece	28th	20 km	1:34:43
2005	World Championships	Helsinki, Finland	17th	20 km	1:32:40
2005	Asian Championships	Incheon, South Korea	3rd	20 km	1:36:39
2006	Asian Games	Doha, Qatar	5th	20 km	1:37.05
2007	Asian Championships	Amman, Jordan	3rd	20 km	1:41:53.0
2007	World Championships	Osaka, Japan	28th	20 km	1:41:54
2008	World Race Walking Cup	Cheboksary, Russia	55th	20 km	1:40:22
2008	Olympic Games	Beijing, China	29th	20 km	1:34:03
2009	World Championships	Berlin, Germany	32nd	20 km	1:40:41
2009	Asian Championships	Guangzhou, China	3rd	20 km	1:36:42
