= 2005 Asian Athletics Championships – Women's 1500 metres =

The women's 1500 metres event at the 2005 Asian Athletics Championships was held in Incheon, South Korea on September 1.

== Results ==
Rank	Name	Nationality	Time	Notes
1st place, gold medalist(s)	Miho Sugimori	Japan	4:12.69	CR
2nd place, silver medalist(s)	Svetlana Lukasheva	Kazakhstan	4:13.83	PB
3rd place, bronze medalist(s)	Yuriko Kobayashi	Japan	4:14.15	
4	Sinimole Paulose	India	4:17.18	SB
5	Orchatteri Jaisha	India	4:17.49	SB
6	Truong Thanh Hang	Vietnam	4:21.10	
7	Do Thi Bong	Vietnam	4:27.26	
8	Bae Hae-Jin	South Korea	4:27.63	PB
9	Jin Yuan	China	4:35.43	
10	Yu Eun-Ji	South Korea	4:54.91	PB
