= Athletics at the 2006 Asian Games – Women's 1500 metres =

Women's 1500 metres at the 2006 Asian Games
- Venue: Khalifa International Stadium
- Dates: 12 December 2006
- Competitors: 14 from 9 nations

Medalists
gold medal	Maryam Yusuf Jamal	Bahrain
silver medal	Yuriko Kobayashi	Japan
bronze medal	Sinimole Paulose	India

The women's 1500 metres competition at the 2006 Asian Games in Doha, Qatar was held on 12 December 2006 at the Khalifa International Stadium.

== Schedule ==
All times are Arabia Standard Time (UTC+03:00)

Date	Time	Event
Tuesday, 12 December 2006	17:30	Final

== Records ==
Prior to this competition, the existing world, Asian and Games records were as follows.

World Record	Qu Yunxia (CHN)	3:50.46	Beijing, China	11 September 1993
Asian Record	Qu Yunxia (CHN)	3:50.46	Beijing, China	11 September 1993
Games Record	Sunita Rani (IND)	4:06.03	Busan, South Korea	10 October 2002

== Results ==
Legend

- DNF — Did not finish

Rank	Athlete	Time	Notes
1st place, gold medalist(s)	Maryam Yusuf Jamal (BRN)	4:08.63	
2nd place, silver medalist(s)	Yuriko Kobayashi (JPN)	4:14.96	
3rd place, bronze medalist(s)	Sinimole Paulose (IND)	4:15.09	
4	Trương Thanh Hằng (VIE)	4:17.66	
5	Svetlana Lukasheva (KAZ)	4:19.20	
6	Liu Qing (CHN)	4:23.80	
7	Mika Yoshikawa (JPN)	4:24.69	
8	Anna Kliushkina (KGZ)	4:30.96	
9	Sara Yusuf Yaqoob (BRN)	4:33.88	
10	Leila Ebrahimi (IRI)	4:42.91	
11	Mina Pourseifi (IRI)	4:47.99	
12	Iman Al-Jallad (SYR)	4:48.19	
—	Tatyana Borisova (KGZ)	DNF	
—	O. P. Jaisha (IND)	DNF	
