= Madhuri Saxena =

Indian athlete (born 1971)

Personal information
- Nationality: Indian
- Born: 15 February 1971 (age 55)

Sport
- Sport: Athletics
- Event(s): 800 m & 1500 m

Achievements and titles
- Personal best(s): 800 m – 2:02.55 (2004); 1500 m – 4:14.78 (2002)
Medal record
Representing India
Asian Games
| Silver medal – second place | 2002 Busan | 800 m |
Asian Championships
| Silver medal – second place | 2003 Manila | 1500 m |

Madhuri Saxena (also Singh) (born 15 February 1971) is an Arjuna award winning Indian athlete. She won the silver medal in the 800m at the 2002 Asian Games in Busan and the silver medal in the 1500 m at the 2003 Asian Athletics Championships. Her daughter Harmilan Bains is also a medalist at the Asian Games.
