= 2005 Asian Athletics Championships – Women's 20 kilometres walk =

The women's 20 kilometres walk event at the 2005 Asian Athletics Championships was held in Incheon, South Korea on September 2.

== Results ==
Rank	Name	Nationality	Time	Notes
1st place, gold medalist(s)	He Dan	China	1:34:25	
2nd place, silver medalist(s)	Tang Yinghua	China	1:34:50	
3rd place, bronze medalist(s)	Svetlana Tolstaya	Kazakhstan	1:36:39	
4	Kim Mi-Jung	South Korea	1:39:21	
5	Yuan Yufang	Malaysia	1:42:20	SB
6	Ryoko Sakakura	Japan	1:49:48	
7	Gallage Geetha	Sri Lanka	1:51:03	
8	Yumnam Bala Devi	India	1:54:52	
