= Athletics at the 2002 Asian Games – Women's 800 metres =

Women's 800 metres
- Venue: Busan Asiad Main Stadium
- Dates: 7–8 October 2002
- Competitors: 12 from 8 nations

Medalists
gold medal	K. M. Beenamol	India
silver medal	Madhuri Saxena	India
bronze medal	Zamira Amirova	Uzbekistan

The women's 800 metres competition at the 2002 Asian Games in Busan, South Korea was held on 7–8 October at the Busan Asiad Main Stadium.

== Schedule ==
All times are Korea Standard Time (UTC+09:00)

Date	Time	Event
Monday, 7 October 2002	15:00	1st round
Tuesday, 8 October 2002	15:20	Final

== Records ==
Prior to this competition, the existing world, Asian and Games records were as follows.

World Record	Jarmila Kratochvílová (TCH)	1:53.28	Munich, West Germany	26 July 1983
Asian Record	Liu Dong (CHN)	1:55.54	Beijing, China	9 September 1993
Games Record	Qu Yunxia (CHN)	1:59.85	Hiroshima, Japan	12 October 1994

== Results ==
=== 1st round ===
- Qualification: First 3 in each heat (Q) and the next 2 fastest (q) advance to the final.

==== Heat 1 ====
Rank	Athlete	Time	Notes
1	K. M. Beenamol (IND)	2:08.74	Q
2	Wang Yuanping (CHN)	2:08.74	Q
3	Tatyana Borisova (KGZ)	2:08.78	Q
4	Tomoko Matsushima (JPN)	2:09.17	q
5	Kim Mi-sun (KOR)	2:13.43	
6	Armonrat Buatharach (THA)	2:20.91	

==== Heat 2 ====
Rank	Athlete	Time	Notes
1	Madhuri Saxena (IND)	2:08.65	Q
2	Miho Sugimori (JPN)	2:08.70	Q
3	Zamira Amirova (UZB)	2:08.92	Q
4	Wang Yanchun (CHN)	2:09.06	q
5	Noh Yu-yeon (KOR)	2:09.94	
6	Phạm Đình Khánh Đoan (VIE)	2:09.95	

=== Final ===
Rank	Athlete	Time	Notes
1st place, gold medalist(s)	K. M. Beenamol (IND)	2:04.17	
2nd place, silver medalist(s)	Madhuri Saxena (IND)	2:04.94	
3rd place, bronze medalist(s)	Zamira Amirova (UZB)	2:05.05	
4	Wang Yuanping (CHN)	2:05.13	
5	Tomoko Matsushima (JPN)	2:05.30	
6	Miho Sugimori (JPN)	2:05.34	
7	Tatyana Borisova (KGZ)	2:06.35	
8	Wang Yanchun (CHN)	2:11.51	
