= Athletics at the 1995 Summer Universiade – Women's marathon =

The women's marathon event at the 1995 Summer Universiade was held on 3 September in Fukuoka, Japan.

== Results ==
Rank	Athlete	Nationality	Time	Notes
1st place, gold medalist(s)	Masako Kusakaya	Japan	2:53:03	
2nd place, silver medalist(s)	Nao Otani	Japan	2:57:09	
3rd place, bronze medalist(s)	Kristi Klinnert	United States	2:57:29	
4	Amy Giblin	United States	3:02:25	
5	Nuța Olaru	Romania	3:03:28	
6	Kae Ito	Japan	3:13:25	
7	Gulsara Dadabayeva	Tajikistan	3:54:54	
	Natsue Koikawa	Japan	DNF	
	Mineko Yamanouchi	Japan	DNF	
	Lidia Panciu	Romania	DNF	
