= Bodybuilding at the 2006 Asian Games – Men's 85 kg =

Men's 85 kg at the 2006 Asian Games
- Venue: Al-Dana Banquet Hall
- Date: 9 December 2006
- Competitors: 10 from 8 nations

Medalists
gold medal	Kamal El-Gargni	Qatar
silver medal	Fadhel Moussa	Bahrain
bronze medal	Kang Kyung-won	South Korea

The men's 85 kilograms event at the 2006 Asian Games was held on December 9, 2006 at the Al-Dana Banquet Hall in Doha, Qatar.

== Schedule ==
All times are Arabia Standard Time (UTC+03:00)

Date	Time	Event
Saturday, 9 December 2006	10:45	Prejudging round
Saturday, 9 December 2006	16:35	Final round

== Results ==
=== Prejudging round ===
Rank	Athlete	Score
1	Kamal El-Gargni (QAT)	5
2	Fadhel Moussa (BRN)	13
3	Kang Kyung-won (KOR)	17
4	Ammar Khamees Al-Khansoori (UAE)	25
5	Reza Bagherzadeh (IRI)	26
6	Ali Imani (IRI)	26
7	Igor Ozernoy (KAZ)	35
8	Sardar Ismail (IRQ)	35
9	Mohammed Zandavi (QAT)	50
DQ	Noorulhoda Shirzad (AFG)	~~39~~

- Noorulhoda Shirzad of Afghanistan originally finished 9th, but was disqualified.

=== Final round ===
Rank	Athlete	Prej.	Final	Total
1st place, gold medalist(s)	Kamal El-Gargni (QAT)	5	5	10
2nd place, silver medalist(s)	Fadhel Moussa (BRN)	13	13	26
3rd place, bronze medalist(s)	Kang Kyung-won (KOR)	17	15	32
4	Ammar Khamees Al-Khansoori (UAE)	25	19	44
5	Reza Bagherzadeh (IRI)	26	23	49
