= 2010 Asian Indoor Athletics Championships =

2010 Asian Indoor Championships
- Dates: February 24–26
- Host city: Tehran, Iran
- Venue: Aftab Enghelab Complex
- Events: 26
- Participation: 193 athletes from 23 nations

The 2010 Asian Indoor Athletics Championships, also known as the IV Asian Indoor Athletics Championships, was an international indoor athletics event took place in Tehran, Iran, between 24 and 26 February. This was the second edition to be hosted in the country as the first championships was also held at the Aftab Enghelab Complex in Tehran. A total of 23 nations sent athletes to compete at the championships, which featured 26 track and field events.

The championships featured somewhat moderate performances – India, who topped the table at the previous edition, decided against sending a number of their top athletes. However, for many athletes it acted as a testing ground in the build up to the 2010 IAAF World Indoor Championships in March. The hosts Iran topped the medal table with five golds. China was second with four golds while Kazakhstan had the second greatest medal haul with a total of 14. Six Asian Indoor Championships records were broken or equalled at the championships.

The female events were held separately from the men's events, taking place during the morning sessions. Due to the Islamic country's customs, men were forbidden from watching the female events. All four of Kyrgyzstan's medals were won by only two women: twenty-year-old Viktoriia Poliudina won both the 1500 metres and 3000 metres events while her compatriot Tatyana Borisova managed an 800 metres silver and 1500 m bronze. Kazakhstan's Oksana Verner was another athlete to win two individual medals as she took silver behind Poliudina on both occasions. Satyender Singh's personal best and championship record throw in the shot put was one of highlights of the programme, although the women's pole vault was a less-contested affair as only two athletes took part.

It was later revealed that Oksana Verner and 400 metres gold medallist Munira Saleh failed a drugs test at the event and was banned from the sport for two years and life respectively.

== Results ==
=== Men ===
Event	Gold		Silver		Bronze	
60 m	Samuel Francis; Qatar	6.58; CR	Reza Ghasemi; Iran	6.67	Barakat Al-Harthi; Oman	6.68
400 m	Bibin Mathew; India	47.81; CR, NR	Reza Bouazar; Iran	48.14	Shahabeddin Tahmasebi; Iran	48.15
800 m	Mohammad Al-Azemi; Kuwait	1:53.22	Musaeb Abdulrahman Balla; Qatar	1:54.25	Masato Yokota; Japan	1:54.71
1500 m	Abubaker Ali Kamal; Qatar	3:51.78	Mohamed Al-Garni; Qatar	3:53.12	Rouhollah Mohammadi; Iran	3:55.64
3000 m	James Kwalia; Qatar	7:57.73	Essa Ismail Rashed; Qatar	7:57.77	Mohammad Khazaei; Iran	8:26.33
60 m hurdles	Jiang Fan; China	7.75 =CR	Fawaz Al-Shammari; Kuwait	7.90	Mohammad Goudarzi; Iran	7.95
4×400 m relay	Iran; Shahabeddin Tahmasebi; Reza Bouazar; Mohsen Zarrin-Afzal; Mehdi Zamani	3:15.02	India; Bibin Mathew; Ajay Kumar; Shake Mortaja; V. B. Bineesh	3:16.05	Kazakhstan; Dmitriy Korabelnikov; Sergey Zaikov; Vyacheslav Muravyev; Nazar Mukhametzhan	3:17.06; NR
High jump	Mutaz Essa Barshim; Qatar	2.20	Keivan Ghanbarzadeh; Iran	2.17	Jean-Claude Rabbath; Lebanon	2.17
Pole vault	Mohsen Rabbani; Iran	5.20	Nikita Filippov; Kazakhstan	5.10	Eshagh Ghaffari; Iran	4.90
Long jump	Rikiya Saruyama; Japan	7.65	Zhuang Haitao; China	7.58	Mohammad Ibrar; India	7.56
Triple jump	Dong Bin; China	16.73; CR	Nobuaki Fujibayashi; Japan	16.33	Roman Valiyev; Kazakhstan	16.25
Shot put	Satyender Singh; India	19.17; CR	Mashari Mohammad; Kuwait	18.78	Hamid Reza Nodehi; Iran	18.58
Heptathlon	Hadi Sepehrzad; Iran	5292 pts	Abdoljalil Tomaj; Iran	5054 pts	P. J. Vinod; India	4981 pts
WR world record | AR area record | CR championship record | GR games record | NR national record | OR Olympic record | PB personal best | SB season best | WL world leading (in a given season)

=== Women ===
Event	Gold		Silver		Bronze	
60 m	Jiang Lan; China	7.51	Han Ling; China	7.55	Olga Bludova; Kazakhstan	7.57
400 m	Marina Maslyonko; Kazakhstan	53.89	Jauna Murmu; India	54.56	Yelena Dombrovskaya; Kazakhstan	55.47
800 m	Truong Thanh Hang; Vietnam	2:12.75	Tatyana Borisova; Kyrgyzstan	2:14.60	Mina Pourseifi; Iran	2:15.87
1500 m	Viktoriia Poliudina; Kyrgyzstan	4:29.65	Tatyana Borisova; Kyrgyzstan	4:32.06	Leila Ebrahimi; Iran	4:36.26
3000 m	Viktoriia Poliudina; Kyrgyzstan	9:39.35	Leila Ebrahimi; Iran	10:05.42	Mahboubeh Ghayour; Iran	10:29.31
60 m hurdles	Wong Wing Sum; Hong Kong	8.79	Somayyeh Mehraban; Iran	9.41	Elnaz Kompani; Iran	9.49
4×400 m relay	India; Priyanka Pawar; Jauna Murmu; A. C. Ashwini; Karnatapu Sowjanya	3:43.83	Kazakhstan; Yelena Dombrovskaya; Marina Maslyonko; Olga Bludova ?	3:44.20	Iran; Mina Pourseifi; Maryam Tousi; Soulmaz Azimian; Soudabeh Sobhani	4:00.03
High jump	Marina Aitova; Kazakhstan	1.93 =CR	Anna Ustinova; Kazakhstan	1.86	Qiao Yanrui; China	1.83
Pole vault	Roslinda Samsu; Malaysia	4.00	Tatyana Turkova; Kazakhstan	3.70	None awarded	
Long jump	Lyudmila Grankovskaya; Kazakhstan	5.98	Chen Yaling; China	5.95	Reshmi Bose; India	5.93
Triple jump	Liu Yanan; China	13.66	Lyudmila Grankovskaya; Kazakhstan	12.95	Tatyana Konysheva; Kazakhstan	12.82
Shot put	Leila Rajabi; Iran	17.32; NR	Meng Qianqian; China	17.03	Ma Qiao; China	16.97
Pentathlon	Zahra Nabizadeh; Iran	2691 pts	Bahar Khasrou; Iraq	2682 pts	Farzaneh Mashayekhi; Iran	2541 pts
WR world record | AR area record | CR championship record | GR games record | NR national record | OR Olympic record | PB personal best | SB season best | WL world leading (in a given season)

== Medal table ==
Rank	Nation	Gold	Silver	Bronze	Total
1	Iran	5	6	12	23
2	China	4	4	2	10
3	Qatar	4	3	0	7
4	Kazakhstan	3	5	5	13
5	India	3	2	3	8
6	Kyrgyzstan	2	2	0	4
7	Kuwait	1	2	0	3
8	Japan	1	1	1	3
9	Hong Kong	1	0	0	1
9	Malaysia	1	0	0	1
9	Vietnam	1	0	0	1
12	Iraq	0	1	0	1
13	Lebanon	0	0	1	1
13	Oman	0	0	1	1
Totals (14 entries)		26	26	25	77

== Participating nations ==
A total of 23 nations were represented by athletes competing at the 2010 championships. This was a smaller amount than the total number of nations that attended the 2008 edition (29).

- Bahrain (2)
- China (14)
- Hong Kong (6)
- India (18)
- Indonesia (1)
- Iran (57)
- Iraq (9)
- Japan (6)
- Kazakhstan (23)
- Kuwait (5)
- Kyrgyzstan (4)
- Lebanon (3)
- Macau (5)
- Malaysia (5)
- Maldives (2)
- Oman (5)
- Philippines (2)
- Qatar (10)
- Syria (4)
- Tajikistan (3)
- Turkmenistan (5)
- United Arab Emirates (1)
- Vietnam (3)
