= 2002 Asian Athletics Championships – Women's 1500 metres =

The women's 1500 metres event at the 2002 Asian Athletics Championships was held in Colombo, Sri Lanka on 11 August.

== Results ==
Rank	Name	Nationality	Time	Notes
1st place, gold medalist(s)	Tatyana Borisova	Kyrgyzstan	4:16.27	
2nd place, silver medalist(s)	Svetlana Lukasheva	Kazakhstan	4:18.63	
3rd place, bronze medalist(s)	Mizuho Nasukawa	Japan	4:19.27	
4	Akiko Kawashima	Japan	4:21.01	
5	Myint Myint Aye	Myanmar	4:22.73	SB
6	Geeta Manral	India	4:23.84	
7	Sunita Kanojia	India	4:24.77	
8	S.N. Silva	Sri Lanka	4:31.71	PB
9	E.R. Damayanthi	Sri Lanka	4:37.92	PB
10	Anusha Athapattu	Sri Lanka	4:50.56	PB
