= Meng Qianqian =

Chinese shot putter (born 1991)

Medal record

Women's athletics

Representing China

Asian Championships
Gold medal – first place	2011 Kobe	Shot put

Asian Indoor Championships
Silver medal – second place	2010 Tehran	Shot put
Bronze medal – third place	2012 Hangzhou	Shot put

World Junior Championships
Silver medal – second place	2010 Moncton	Shot put

Universiade
Bronze medal – third place	2011 Shenzhen	Shot put

Meng Qianqian (Chinese: 孟倩倩 ; born 6 January 1991) is a Chinese track and field athlete who competes in the women's shot put. She is the reigning Asian champion in the event.

She threw the shot beyond 17 metres for the first time in 2008 and won her first titles that same year, claiming the gold medals at the National Youth Championships and the Asian Junior Athletics Championships. Meng was chosen to represent her country at the 2008 World Junior Championships in Athletics and she ended that competition in fifth. The following year she won the Chinese junior and high school, then came sixth at the 2009 National Games of China with a personal best of 17.52 m.

At the 2010 Asian Indoor Athletics Championships, she won her first senior medal as she came runner-up in the shot put to Iranian Leila Rajabi. However, she was not in as good form outdoors and was beaten to the title at the 2010 World Junior Championships by the less experienced Geisa Arcanjo. The 2011 outdoor season proved to be a breakthrough year for Meng and she began with a throw of 18.09 m on the Chinese Athletics Grand Prix circuit – her first clearance over 18 metres. She improved her best further at the 2011 Asian Athletics Championships, tossing the shot to 18.31 m and defeating fellow Chinese thrower Liu Xiangrong to win the gold medal.
