= Alexandra Fisher =

Kazakhstani shot putter

Personal information
- Born: 3 June 1988 (age 37) Pavlodar, Kazakh SSR, Soviet Union
- Height: 1.74 m (5 ft 8 1/2 in)
- Weight: 63 kg (139 lb)

Sport
- Country: Kazakhstan
- Sport: Athletics
- Event: Shot Put
- Updated on 6 August 2012

Alexandra Fisher (born 3 June 1988, in Pavlodar) is a Kazakhstani athlete. She competed for Kazakhstan in shot put at the 2012 Summer Olympics.
