= Gulsara Dadabayeva =

Tajik long-distance runner (born 1976)

Personal information
- Born: 4 July 1976 (age 50) Dushanbe, Soviet Union

Sport
- Sport: Long-distance running

Gulsara Dadabayeva (Cyrillic Гулсара Дадабаева; born 4 July 1976) is a retired Tajikistani long-distance runner who competed primarily in the marathon. She represented her country at the 1996, 2000 and 2004 Summer Olympics, as well as four World Championships. She was the first woman to represent Tajikistan at the Olympics.

== Competition record ==
Year	Competition	Venue	Position	Event	Notes
Representing Tajikistan
1993	World Championships	Stuttgart, Germany	42nd (h)	3000 m	10:29.69
1993	World Championships	Stuttgart, Germany	38th (h)	10,000 m	39:30.28
1994	World Junior Championships	Lisbon, Portugal	24th (h)	3000 m	10:25.90
1994	World Junior Championships	Lisbon, Portugal	17th	10,000 m	39:04.59
1995	World Indoor Championships	Barcelona, Spain	13th	3000 m	10:41.43
1995	Universiade	Fukuoka, Japan	7th	Marathon	3:54:54
1996	Olympic Games	Atlanta, United States	61st	Marathon	3:09:08
1997	World Championships	Athens, Greece	54th	Marathon	3:30:45
1998	Asian Games	Bangkok, Thailand	–	Marathon	DQ
1999	World Championships	Seville, Spain	42nd	Marathon	3:23:01
2000	Olympic Games	Sydney, Australia	41st	Marathon	2:51:03
2001	World Championships	Edmonton, Canada	46th	Marathon	2:54:12
2002	World Half Marathon Championships	Brussels, Belgium	61st	Half marathon	1:19:08
2002	Asian Championships	Colombo, Sri Lanka	–	10,000 m	DNF
2002	Asian Games	Busan, South Korea	7th	Marathon	2:58:15
2004	Olympic Games	Athens, Greece	53rd	Marathon	2:50:45

== Personal bests ==
Outdoor

- 3000 metres – 10:29.69 (Stuttgart 1993)
- 5000 metres – 18:50.8 (Dushanbe 1996) NR
- 10,000 metres – 39:04.59 (Lisbon 1994) NR
- Half marathon – 1:19:08 (Brussels 2002) NR
- Marathon – 2:39:03 (Ljubljana 2003) NR

Indoor

- 1500 metres – 4:36.8 (Rasht 2001) NR
- 3000 metres – 10:41.43 (Barcelona 1995)
