= Athletics at the 2002 Asian Games – Women's marathon =

Athletic competition

Women's marathon at the 2002 Asian Games
- Venue: Busan Asiad Main Stadium
- Date: 13 October 2002
- Competitors: 11 from 8 nations

Medalists
gold medal	Ham Bong-sil	North Korea
silver medal	Harumi Hiroyama	Japan
bronze medal	Hiromi Ominami	Japan

The women's marathon competition at the 2002 Asian Games in Busan, South Korea was held on 13 October at the Busan Asiad Main Stadium.

== Schedule ==
All times are Korea Standard Time (UTC+09:00)

Date	Time	Event
Sunday, 13 October 2002	09:00	Final

== Records ==
Prior to this competition, the existing world, Asian and Games records were as follows.

World Record	Catherine Ndereba (KEN)	2:18:47	Chicago, United States	7 October 2001
Asian Record	Naoko Takahashi (JPN)	2:19:46	Berlin, Germany	30 September 2001
Games Record	Naoko Takahashi (JPN)	2:21:47	Bangkok, Thailand	6 December 1998

== Results ==
Legend

- DNF — Did not finish

Rank	Athlete	Time	Notes
1st place, gold medalist(s)	Ham Bong-sil (PRK)	2:33:35	
2nd place, silver medalist(s)	Harumi Hiroyama (JPN)	2:34:44	
3rd place, bronze medalist(s)	Hiromi Ominami (JPN)	2:37:48	
4	Oh Mi-ja (KOR)	2:42:38	
5	Kim Chang-ok (PRK)	2:43:17	
6	Pa Pa (MYA)	2:52:05	
7	Gulsara Dadabayeva (TJK)	2:58:15	
8	Christabel Martes (PHI)	3:09:48	
9	Mariana Diaz Ximenez (TMP)	3:22:03	
—	Liu Min (CHN)	DNF	
—	Kwon Eun-ju (KOR)	DNF	
