= Harminder Singh =

Indian race walker

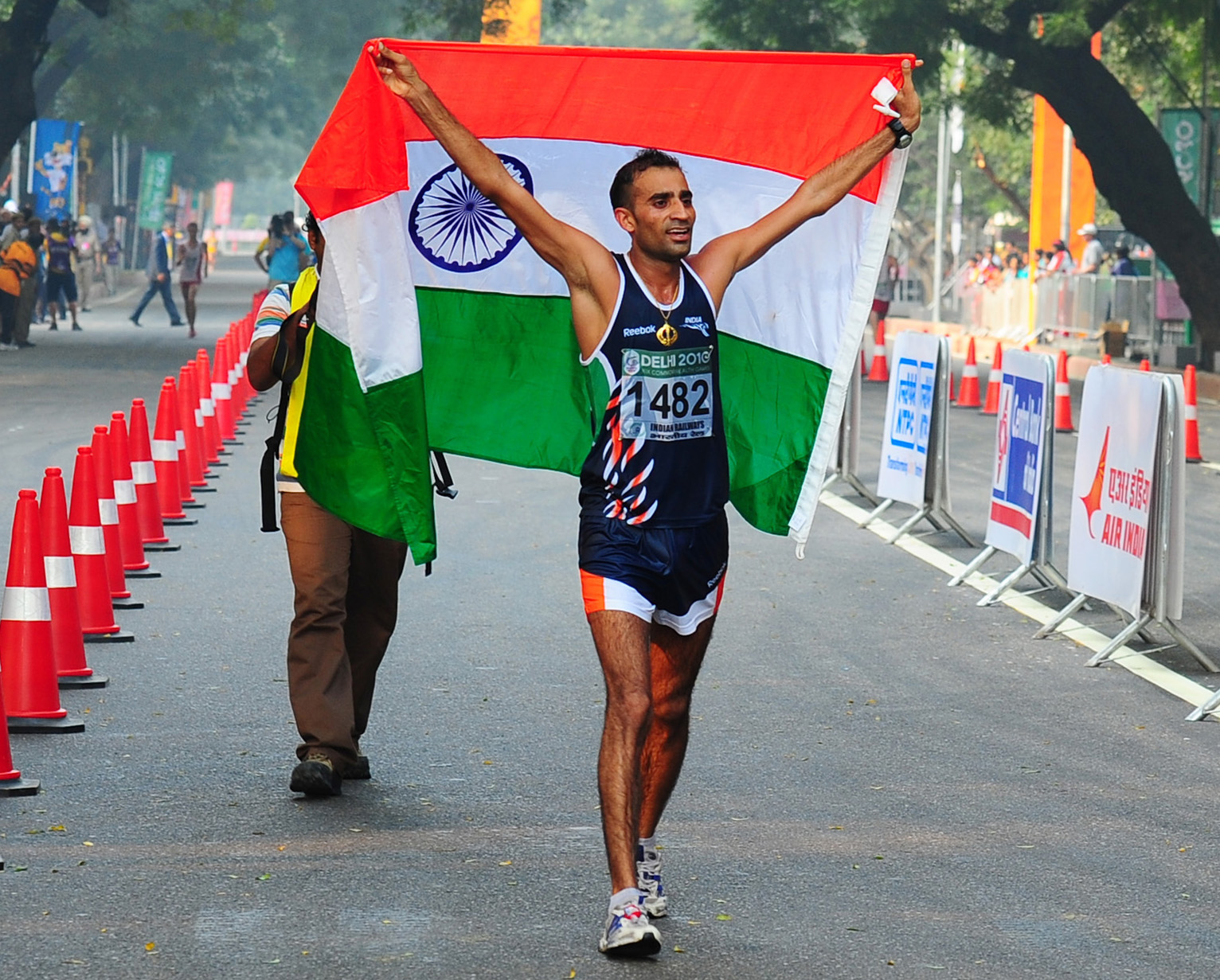
XIX Commonwealth Games-2010 Delhi Harminder Singh of India won the bronze medal in (20km Walk Men), in New Delhi on 9 October 2010

Harminder Singh (born 9 May 1984) is a retired Indian race walker. He was placed sixth at the 2010 Asian Games and won the bronze medal at the 2010 Commonwealth Games, all in the 20 kilometre event.
