= Svetlana Lukasheva =

Kazakhstani middle-distance runner

Medal record

Women's athletics

Representing Kazakhstan

Asian Championships
Silver medal – second place	2002 Colombo	1500 m
Silver medal – second place	2005 Incheon	1500 m
Bronze medal – third place	2003 Manila	1500 m

Asian Indoor Championships
Gold medal – first place	2004 Tehran	3000 m
Gold medal – first place	2006 Pattaya	4x400 m
Silver medal – second place	2004 Tehran	1500 m
Bronze medal – third place	2006 Pattaya	1500 m

Svetlana Lukasheva (born 2 May 1977) is a Kazakhstani middle-distance runner who specialized in the 1500 metres.

== Competition record ==
Year	Competition	Venue	Position	Event	Notes
Representing Kazakhstan
2002	Asian Championships	Colombo, Sri Lanka	2nd	1500 m	4:18.63
2002	Asian Games	Busan, South Korea	6th	1500 m	4:16.93
2003	Universiade	Daegu, South Korea	6th	1500 m	4:14.07
2003	Asian Championships	Manila, Philippines	5th	800 m	2:05.31
2003	Asian Championships	Manila, Philippines	3rd	1500 m	4:23.12
2003	Afro-Asian Games	Hyderabad, India	6th	1500 m	4:26.31
2004	Asian Indoor Championships	Tehran, Iran	2nd	1500 m	4:36.94
2004	Asian Indoor Championships	Tehran, Iran	1st	3000 m	10:10.05
2005	Asian Championships	Incheon, South Korea	2nd	1500 m	4:13.83
2005	Asian Indoor Games	Bangkok, Thailand	2nd	1500 m	4:16.96
2006	Asian Indoor Championships	Pattaya, Thailand	3rd	1500 m	4:19.50
2006	Asian Indoor Championships	Pattaya, Thailand	1st	4 × 400 m relay	3:41.39
2006	Asian Games	Doha, Qatar	5th	1500 m	4:19.20
2007	Asian Indoor Games	Macau	2nd	1500 m	4:24.92

=== Personal bests ===
- 800 metres - 2:03.77 min (2003)
- 1500 metres - 4:13.83 min (2005)
