= Jauna Murmu =

Indian sprinter and hurdler

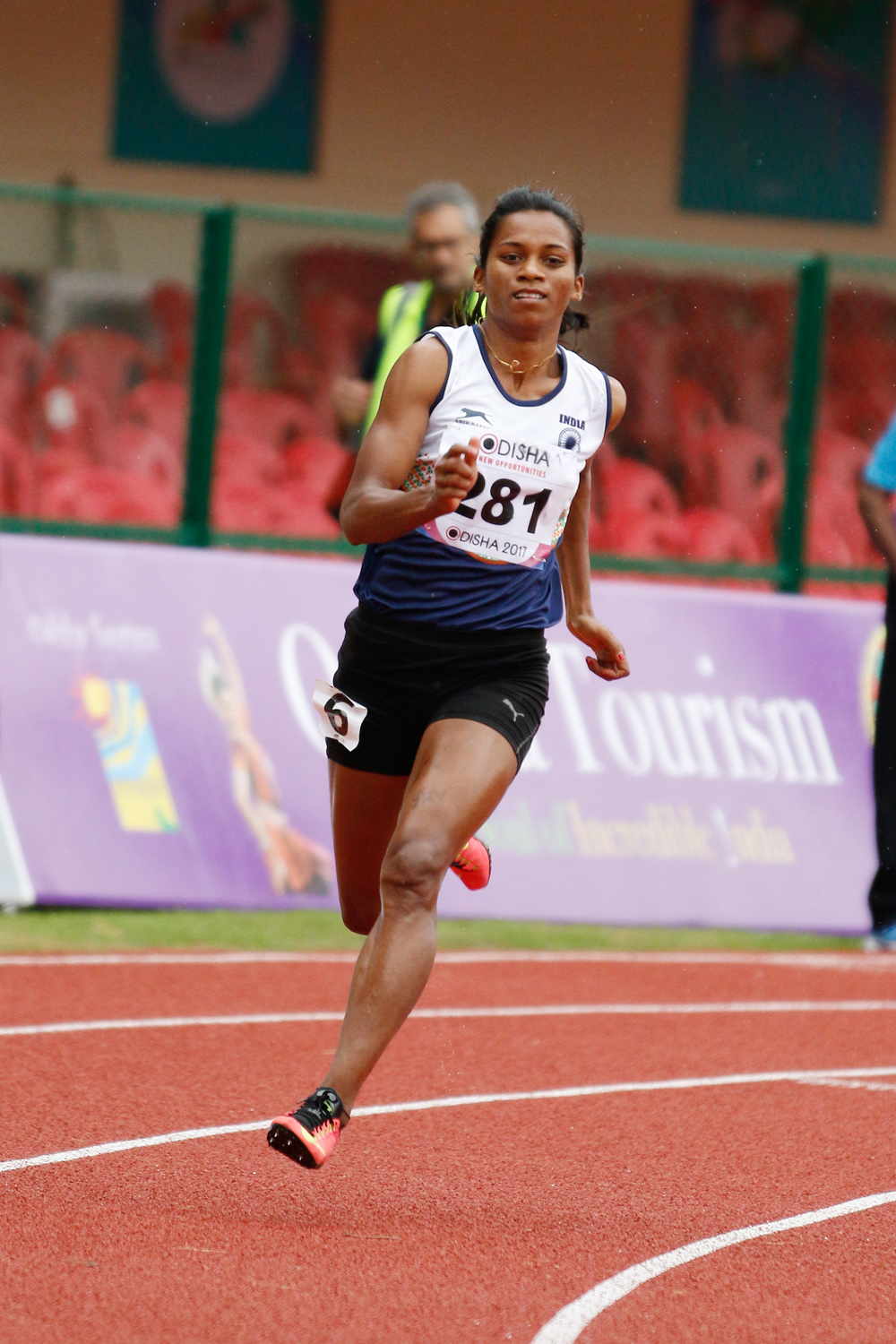

Personal information
- Full name: Jauna Murmu
- Nationality: India
- Born: August 16, 1990 (age 36) Mayurbhanj, Odisha, India

Sport
- Country: India
- Sport: Sprinter, Hurdler
- Events: 400 metres, 400 metre hurdles
Medal record
Women's athletics
Representing India
Commonwealth Games
Gold medal – first place	2010 Delhi	4 × 400 m relay
Asian Indoor Athletics Championships
Gold medal – first place	2010 Tehran	4 x 100 m relay
Silver medal – second place	2010 Tehran	400 m
South Asian Games
Gold medal – first place	2016 Guwahati	400 m hurdles
Bronze medal – third place	2010 Dhaka	200 m

Jauna Murmu (born 16 August 1990) is an Indian sprint runner and hurdler from Odisha who specializes in 400 metres and 400 metres hurdles. She belongs to Mayurbhanj District of Odisha. She has received coaching from Arun Kumar Das and Subash Chandra Dasmohapatra. She is presently employed by with ONGC

== Achievements ==
She has multiple International and national achievements.

=== International ===
- Finished 4th in 400m hurdles in 2010 Asian Games held in Guangzhou, China.
- Won one gold medal in women's 400 metre hurdles event, clocking 57.39 seconds and claimed one bronze in 400 metres sprint with a timing of 53.17 seconds in the 3rd Asian All Star Athletics Meet, which concluded at New Delhi on July 30, 2010.
- Two gold medals in the 2016 South Asian Games: in the 400m hurdles and the 4 × 400 m relay.

=== National ===
- Won the silver medal in women's 400m event of the National Inter-State Senior Athletics Championship, clocking 52.78 seconds at Patiala, Punjab on August 6, 2010.

== Doping ==
Murmu tested positive for the anabolic steroid Methandienone in an out of competition test 25 May 2011 and was subsequently handed a two-year doping ban.
