= 1994 World Junior Championships in Athletics – Women's 10,000 metres =

The women's 10,000 metres event at the 1994 World Junior Championships in Athletics was held in Lisbon, Portugal, at Estádio Universitário de Lisboa on 24 July.

== Medalists ==
Gold	Yoko Yamazaki; Japan
Silver	Jacqueline Okemwa; Kenya
Bronze	Jebiwot Keitany; Kenya

== Results ==
=== Final ===
24 July

Rank	Name	Nationality	Time	Notes
1st place, gold medalist(s)	Yoko Yamazaki	Japan	32:34.11	
2nd place, silver medalist(s)	Jacqueline Okemwa	Kenya	33:19.51	
3rd place, bronze medalist(s)	Jebiwot Keitany	Kenya	33:35.98	
4	Maria Sangeorzan	Romania	33:49.19	
5	Birhan Dagne	Ethiopia	34:13.58	
6	Lu Jing	China	34:33.87	
7	Erika Olivera	Chile	34:36.96	
8	Rodica Chirita	Romania	34:41.87	
9	Yoshiko Imura	Japan	35:14.14	
10	Maria Stella Di Santo	Italy	35:26.81	
11	Esther Heinold	Germany	35:41.74	
12	Donna Fidler	United States	36:01.70	
13	Jeļena Čelnova	Latvia	36:21.59	
14	Getenesh Tamirat	Ethiopia	36:26.38	
15	Natalya Polikarpova	Russia	37:21.32	
16	Molly Dinan	United States	37:41.65	
17	Gulsara Dadabayeva	Tajikistan	39:04.59	
	Elvira Longo	Spain	DNF	
	Tatyana Tomashova	Russia	DNF	

== Participation ==
According to an unofficial count, 19 athletes from 13 countries participated in the event.

- Chile (1)
- China (1)
- Ethiopia (2)
- Germany (1)
- Italy (1)
- Japan (2)
- Kenya (2)
- Latvia (1)
- Romania (2)
- Russia (2)
- Spain (1)
- Tajikistan (1)
- United States (2)
