= Bodybuilding at the 2006 Asian Games – Men's 90 kg =

Men's 90 kg at the 2006 Asian Games
- Venue: Al-Dana Banquet Hall
- Date: 9 December 2006
- Competitors: 8 from 7 nations

Medalists
| gold medal | Ali Tabrizi | Qatar |
| silver medal | Hassan Al-Saka | Syria |
| bronze medal | Lam Man Shing | Hong Kong |

The men's 90 kilograms event at the 2006 Asian Games was held on December 9, 2006, at the Al-Dana Banquet Hall in Doha, Qatar.

== Schedule ==
All times are Arabia Standard Time (UTC+03:00)

| Date | Time | Event |
|---|---|---|
| Saturday, 9 December 2006 | 11:30 | Prejudging round |
| Saturday, 9 December 2006 | 17:20 | Final round |

== Results ==
=== Prejudging round ===
| Rank | Athlete | Score |
|---|---|---|
| 1 | Ali Tabrizi (QAT) | 5 |
| 2 | Kim Myong-hun (KOR) | ~~11~~ |
| 3 | Lam Man Shing (HKG) | 17 |
| 4 | Hassan Al-Saka (SYR) | 18 |
| 5 | Abdulla Saleh (QAT) | 24 |
| 6 | Nooh Hasan (BRN) | 32 |
| 7 | Ehsanollah Kangarloo (IRI) | 32 |
| DQ | Aziz Ahmad Nikyar (AFG) | ~~40~~ |

- Aziz Ahmad Nikyar of Afghanistan originally finished 8th, but was disqualified.

=== Final round ===
| Rank | Athlete | Prej. | Final | Total |
|---|---|---|---|---|
| 1st place, gold medalist(s) | Ali Tabrizi (QAT) | 5 | 5 | 10 |
| 2nd place, silver medalist(s) | Hassan Al-Saka (SYR) | 18 | 14 | 32 |
| 3rd place, bronze medalist(s) | Lam Man Shing (HKG) | 17 | 19 | 36 |
| 4 | Abdulla Saleh (QAT) | 24 | 25 | 49 |
| DQ | Kim Myong-hun (KOR) | 11 | 11 | ~~22~~ |

- Kim Myong-hun of South Korea originally won the silver medal, but was disqualified after he failed the drug test.
