= Athletics at the 1998 Asian Games – Women's 1500 metres =

Women's 1500 metres at the 1998 Asian Games
- Venue: Thammasat Stadium
- Dates: 14 December 1998
- Competitors: 8 from 6 nations

Medalists
gold medal	Jyotirmoyee Sikdar	India
silver medal	Wang Qingfen	China
bronze medal	Sunita Rani	India

The women's 1500 metres competition at the 1998 Asian Games in Bangkok, Thailand was held on 14 December at the Thammasat Stadium.

== Schedule ==
All times are Indochina Time (UTC+07:00)

Date	Time	Event
Monday, 14 December 1998	15:10	Final

== Results ==
Rank	Athlete	Time	Notes
1st place, gold medalist(s)	Jyotirmoyee Sikdar (IND)	4:12.82	
2nd place, silver medalist(s)	Wang Qingfen (CHN)	4:13.19	
3rd place, bronze medalist(s)	Sunita Rani (IND)	4:13.66	
4	Ikumi Nagayama (JPN)	4:19.11	
5	Yan Wei (CHN)	4:20.34	
6	Keshani Samarakoon (SRI)	4:35.00	
7	Phạm Đình Khánh Đoan (VIE)	4:36.15	
8	Vijitra Soranaraangsan (THA)	5:00.51	
