= Chu Yafei =

Chinese racewalker (born 1988)

Medal record

Men's athletics

Representing China

Asian Championships
Silver medal – second place	2009 Guangzhou	20 km walk

Chu Yafei, also known as Zhu Yafei, (born September 5, 1988 in Inner Mongolia) is a Chinese race walker. He has represented his country at the 2008 Summer Olympics and the 2009 World Championships in Athletics.

== Career ==
While undergoing his studies, he took part in the 2007 Summer Universiade and won the 20 km walk title ahead of the more experienced Park Chil-Sung. He competed at the 20 km race walk event at the 2008 Summer Olympics. He competed at his first world championships the following year and took thirteenth place in the 20 km walk at the 2009 World Championships in Berlin. After the major championships he took to the national and continental stages: taking a bronze medal for Inner Mongolia at the 11th National Games of China behind Wang Hao and Li Jianbo, and then upgrading to the silver medal at the 2009 Asian Athletics Championships – just one second behind Li.

He had success on the racewalking circuit in 2010, taking the silver medal in the 20 km walk at the 2010 IAAF World Race Walking Cup, behind compatriot Wang Hao. He then took wins at the Na Rynek Marsz! and Gran Premio Cantones de Marcha meets in May and June.

== Achievements ==
- 2005 National Middle School Students Games - 1st 10000m walk;
- 2006/2007 National Champions Tournament (Junior Group) - 1st 10 km/30 km walk;
- 2006 IAAF Race Walking Challenge - 5th 20 km walk;
- 2007 National Intercity Games - 3rd 20000m walk;
- 2007 National Champions Tournament Junior Groups - 1st 30 km;
- 2007 World University Games - 1st 20 km walk

=== Records ===
- 2007 National Champions Tournament - 39:00 10 km walk (AJR/NJR)
