= Athletics at the 2010 Asian Games – Men's 20 kilometres walk =

Men's 20 kilometres walk at the 2010 Asian Games
- Venue: Aoti Main Stadium
- Date: 21 November 2010
- Competitors: 9 from 5 nations

Medalists
gold medal	Wang Hao	China
silver medal	Chu Yafei	China
bronze medal	Kim Hyun-sub	South Korea

The men's 20 kilometres walk event at the 2010 Asian Games was held in Aoti Main Stadium, Guangzhou, China on 21 November.

== Schedule ==
All times are China Standard Time (UTC+08:00)

Date	Time	Event
Sunday, 21 November 2010	09:00	Final

== Records ==
Prior to this competition, the existing world, Asian and Games records were as follows.

World Record	Vladimir Kanaykin (RUS)	1:17:16	Saransk, Russia	29 September 2007
Asian Record	Zhu Hongjun (CHN)	1:17:41	Cixi, China	23 April 2005
Games Record	Yu Guohui (CHN)	1:20:25	Bangkok, Thailand	13 December 1998

== Results ==
Legend

- DSQ — Disqualified

Rank	Athlete	Time	Notes
1st place, gold medalist(s)	Wang Hao (CHN)	1:20:50	
2nd place, silver medalist(s)	Chu Yafei (CHN)	1:21:57	
3rd place, bronze medalist(s)	Kim Hyun-sub (KOR)	1:22:47	
4	Isamu Fujisawa (JPN)	1:24:00	
5	Yusuke Suzuki (JPN)	1:25:50	
6	Harminder Singh (IND)	1:26:33	
7	Baljinder Singh (IND)	1:28:06	
8	Ayoob Sarwashi (UAE)	1:36:41	
—	Park Chil-sung (KOR)	DSQ	
