= Tatyana Borisova =

Kyrgyzstani middle distance runner

Medal record

Women's athletics

Representing Kyrgyzstan

Asian Championships
Gold medal – first place	2002 Colombo	1500 m
Gold medal – first place	2003 Manila	1500 m
Silver medal – second place	2002 Colombo	800 m

Asian Indoor Championships
Silver medal – second place	2010 Tehran	800 m
Silver medal – second place	2010 Tehran	1500 m

Tatyana Borisova (born 3 June 1975) is a Kyrgyzstani middle-distance runner who specializes in the 1500 metres. She represented her country at the 2004 Summer Olympics, where she ran in the qualifiers of the 1500 m.

Borisova has competed at the IAAF World Cross Country Championships twice (in 2002 and 2003), and also in the IAAF World Championships in Athletics twice, running in the 1500 m in 2001 and 2003. She later moved on to longer distances, winning the Austin Marathon in 2004 and 2005. She also ran at the Pune Half Marathon in 2004, finishing in third position.

She enjoyed a resurgence at the 2010 Asian Indoor Athletics Championships, winning a silver medal in the 800 metres and 1500 m bronze.

== Competition record ==
Year	Competition	Venue	Position	Event	Notes
Representing Kyrgyzstan
1994	World Junior Championships	Lisbon, Portugal	30th (h)	800m	2:12.68
2001	World Championships	Edmonton, Canada	25th (h)	800 m	2:05.63
2002	Asian Championships	Colombo, Sri Lanka	2nd	800 m	2:03.67
2002	Asian Championships	Colombo, Sri Lanka	1st	1500 m	4:16.27
2002	World Cup	Madrid, Spain	6th	1500 m	4:11.14
2002	Asian Games	Busan, South Korea	7th	800 m	2:06.35
2002	Asian Games	Busan, South Korea	2nd	1500 m	4:12.53
2003	World Championships	Paris, France	32nd (h)	800 m	2:05.31
2003	Asian Championships	Manila, Philippines	1st	1500 m	4:15.97
2004	Olympic Games	Athens, Greece	36th (h)	1500 m	4:13.36
2006	Asian Games	Doha, Qatar	–	800 m	DNF
2006	Asian Games	Doha, Qatar	–	1500 m	DNF
2010	Asian Indoor Championships	Tehran, Iran	2nd	800 m	2:14.60
2010	Asian Indoor Championships	Tehran, Iran	3rd	1500 m	4:32.06
2010	Asian Games	Guangzhou, China	9th	1500 m	4:21.88

=== Personal bests ===
- 800 metres - 2:01.70 min (2004)
- 1500 metres - 4:07.08 min (2004)
- 3000 metres - 9:34.60 min (2003, indoor)
- Half marathon - 1:12:30 hrs (2004)
