= He Dan =

Chinese racewalker

Medal record

Women's athletics

Representing China

Asian Championships
Gold medal – first place	2005 Incheon	20 km walk

He Dan (born 22 July 1984) is a Chinese race walker.

== Achievements ==
Year	Competition	Venue	Position	Notes
Representing China
2005	Asian Championships	Incheon, South Korea	1st	20 km
2006	World Race Walking Cup	A Coruña, Spain	4th	20 km
2006	Asian Games	Doha, Qatar	3rd	20 km
