= O. P. Jaisha =

Indian athlete

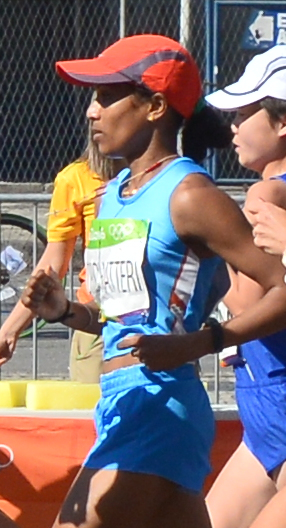

Personal information
- Full name: Orchatteri Puthiyaveetil Jaisha
- Nationality: Indian
- Born: 23 May 1983 (age 43) Kerala, India

Sport
- Country: India
- Sport: Track and field athletics
- Events: Middle distance 5000 metres Marathon

Achievements and titles
- Personal bests: Marathon: 2:34:43 NR (Beijing 2015)
Medal record
Women's athletics
Representing India
Asian Games
Bronze medal – third place	2006 Doha	5000 m
Bronze medal – third place	2014 Incheon	1500 m
Asian Indoor Championships
Silver medal – second place	2006 Pattaya	1500 m
Bronze medal – third place	2006 Pattaya	3000 m
- Updated on 30 August 2015

Jaisha Orchatteri Puthiya Veetil (born 23 May 1983), commonly known as O. P. Jaisha, is an Indian track and field athlete from Kerala. She is the current national record holder in the marathon, a distinction she achieved by clocking 2:34:43 at the 2015 World Championships in Beijing. In the process she bettered her own mark of 2:37:29, set at the 2015 Mumbai Marathon. She is also a former national record holder in the 3000 metres steeplechase.

She is currently being supported by JSW Sport under the Sport Excellence Programme.

== Career ==
An alumnus of Assumption College, Changanassery, Jaisha competes in the middle and the long distance events, including 1500 metres, 3000 metres, 3000 metres steeplechase, and 5000 metres. She won gold over 1500 metres and 3000 metres at the 1st Asian Indoor Games held at Bangkok in 2005. She was, however, unable to repeat her performance at the 2006 Asian Indoor Championships, held at Pattaya, as she won only a silver in the 1500 metres and a bronze in the 3000 metres.

She represented India at the 2006 Commonwealth Games held in Melbourne, Australia. Jaisha is also a bronze medalist in 5000 metres at the Doha Asiad.

Jaisha took up steeplechase only in 2008 when she clinched the National title at Madurai Inter-State championships. However, she broke the Indian national record in 3000 metres steeplechase with a time of 10:03.05 at the 50th National Inter-State Athletics Championships held in Patiala on 7 August 2010. She erased the previous mark of 10:09.56 set by Sudha Singh on 18 May 2010 in Kochi.

At the 2014 Asian Games held in Incheon, South Korea, Jaisha won the 1500 metres bronze with a time of 4:13.46.

The following year in 2015, she made her marathon debut at the Mumbai Marathon and clinched first place in the Indian women's category (eighth overall), breaking a 19-year-old record in the process.

At the National Games, held early February in the year in Jaisha's home state of Kerala, the marathon runner easily beat out the rest of her competition and won the gold medal in the 5000m event.

In August 2015, Jaisha participated in the marathon at the World Championships in Beijing, where she finished 18th, one place ahead of compatriot Sudha Singh, among the 52 athletes who completed the race. Both Jaisha and Singh improved upon the former's national record time set earlier in the year at the Mumbai Marathon, and both also qualified for the 2016 Olympics by virtue of their showing.

On 22 August 2016, post her return from the 2016 Summer Olympics, Jaisha controversially alleged that she fainted at the finish line post her race as she was "not given" enough water and energy drinks in between the race, during the Women's marathon event.

== Competition record ==
Year	Competition	Venue	Position	Event	Notes
Representing India
2005	Asian Indoor Games	Bangkok, Thailand	1st	1500 metres	4:15.75
2005	Asian Indoor Games	Bangkok, Thailand	1st	3000 metres	9:38.43
2006	Asian Indoor Championships	Pattaya, Thailand	2nd	1500 metres	4:18.50
2006	Asian Indoor Championships	Pattaya, Thailand	3rd	3000 metres	9:26.72
2006	Asian Games	Doha, Qatar	3rd	5000 metres	15:41.91
2014	Asian Games	Incheon, South Korea	3rd	1500 metres	4:13.46
2015	Mumbai Marathon	Mumbai, India	8th	Marathon	2:37:29 NR
2015	World Championships	Beijing, China	18th	Marathon	2:34:43 NR

== Awards ==
After her feats in the 2014 Asian Games which saw Jaisha win a bronze medal and achieve a personal best record, Kerala Chief Minister Oomen Chandy announced a cash reward for 7.5 lakhs to be awarded to Jaisha.

== See also ==
- Official Facebook page of O.P.Jaisha
- O. P. Jaisha at World Athletics
