= Bodybuilding at the 2002 Asian Games – Men's +90 kg =

Men's +90 kg at the 2002 Asian Games
- Venue: Busan Citizens' Hall
- Date: 4–6 October 2002
- Competitors: 9 from 7 nations

Medalists
gold medal	Mohammad Anouti	Lebanon
silver medal	Wimpi Wungow	Indonesia
bronze medal	Choi Jae-duck	South Korea

The men's +90 kilograms event at the 2002 Asian Games was held on October 4 and October 6, 2002 at the Busan Citizens' Hall in Busan, South Korea.

== Schedule ==
All times are Korea Standard Time (UTC+09:00)

Date	Time	Event
Friday, 4 October 2002	15:00	Preliminary round
Sunday, 6 October 2002	18:00	Final round

== Results ==
=== Preliminary round ===
Order	Athlete	Note
1	Konstantin Meshkov (KAZ)	
2	Andrey Massyuk (KAZ)	Pass
3	Choi Jae-duck (KOR)	Pass
4	Salem Hamad (QAT)	
5	Cao Xiongjie (CHN)	
6	Youssef El-Zein (LIB)	Pass
7	Wimpi Wungow (INA)	Pass
8	Mohammad Anouti (LIB)	Pass
9	Nooh Hasan (BRN)	Pass

=== Final round ===
Rank	Athlete
1st place, gold medalist(s)	Mohammad Anouti (LIB)
2nd place, silver medalist(s)	Wimpi Wungow (INA)
3rd place, bronze medalist(s)	Choi Jae-duck (KOR)
4	Andrey Massyuk (KAZ)
5	Nooh Hasan (BRN)
DQ	Youssef El-Zein (LIB)

- Youssef El-Zein of Lebanon originally won the bronze medal, but was disqualified after refusing to take a dope test.
