= Athletics at the 2006 Asian Games – Women's 10,000 metres =

Women's 10,000 metres at the 2006 Asian Games
- Venue: Khalifa International Stadium
- Dates: 8 December 2006
- Competitors: 8 from 6 nations

Medalists
gold medal	Kayoko Fukushi	Japan
silver medal	Kareema Saleh Jasim	Bahrain
bronze medal	Hiromi Ominami	Japan

The women's 10000 metres competition at the 2006 Asian Games in Doha, Qatar was held on 8 December 2006 at the Khalifa International Stadium.

== Schedule ==
All times are Arabia Standard Time (UTC+03:00)

Date	Time	Event
Friday, 8 December 2006	18:30	Final

== Records ==
Prior to this competition, the existing world, Asian and Games records were as follows.

World Record	Wang Junxia (CHN)	29:31.78	Beijing, China	8 September 1993
Asian Record	Wang Junxia (CHN)	29:31.78	Beijing, China	8 September 1993
Games Record	Sun Yingjie (CHN)	30:28.26	Busan, South Korea	8 October 2002

== Results ==
Legend

- DNS — Did not start

Rank	Athlete	Time	Notes
1st place, gold medalist(s)	Kayoko Fukushi (JPN)	31:29.38	
2nd place, silver medalist(s)	Kareema Saleh Jasim (BRN)	32:17.14	
3rd place, bronze medalist(s)	Hiromi Ominami (JPN)	32:18.02	
4	Xi Qiuhong (CHN)	33:18.23	
5	Preeja Sreedharan (IND)	33:48.45	
6	Park Ho-sun (KOR)	35:01.01	
7	Kanchhi Maya Koju (NEP)	37:59.76	
—	Taba Naser Waked (BRN)	DNS	
