= 2003 Asian Athletics Championships – Women's 1500 metres =

The women's 1500 metres event at the 2003 Asian Athletics Championships was held in Manila, Philippines on September 21.

== Results ==
Rank	Name	Nationality	Time	Notes
1st place, gold medalist(s)	Tatyana Borisova	Kyrgyzstan	4:15.97	SB
2nd place, silver medalist(s)	Madhuri Singh	India	4:17.87	SB
3rd place, bronze medalist(s)	Svetlana Lukasheva	Kazakhstan	4:23.12	
4	Wang Qi	China	4:24.37	
5	Akemi Ozaki	Japan	4:26.67	
6	Kayo Sugihara	Japan	4:30.24	
7	Oliva Sadi	Indonesia	4:37.55	
8	Chia Xian	Singapore	4:51.92	PB
