= Duaij bin Salman Al Khalifa =

Bahraini soldier

Duaij bin Salman bin Ahmed bin Mohammed bin Isa Al Khalifa (Arabic: دعيج بن سلمان بن أحمد بن محمد بن عيسى آل خليفة, 1953 (age 71–72)) is a Bahraini soldier who currently holds the position of Chief of Staff of the Bahrain Defence Force.

== Career ==
He was born in Muharraq in 1953. He holds a diploma in military science and has taken specialized courses on Special Forces and paratrooper operations and on counterterrorism. After finishing officer training, he took over the Special Forces in 1988.

== Medals ==
- Isa bin Salman Al Khalifa Award
- Bahrain Medal, Second Class
- Bahrain Medal, Third Class
- Military Service Medal, First Class
- Military Duty Medal
- Kuwait Liberation Medal
- Dialogue Medal, First Class

== Personal life ==
D’aij has two sons and four daughters:

1. Khaled
2. Ahmed
3. Nouf
4. Lulwa
5. Naila
6. Mai
