= Yuriko Kobayashi =

Japanese runner (born 1988)

Medal record

Women's athletics

Representing Japan

Asian Championships
Bronze medal – third place	2005 Incheon	1500 m

Yuriko Kobayashi (Japanese: 小林 祐梨子; born 12 December 1988) is a Japanese professional middle- and long-distance runner who specializes in the 1500 metres and 5000 metres. She represented Japan at the 2008 Summer Olympics.

She started out in middle-distance events, running in the 800 metres at the 2004 World Junior Championships and then winning a 1500 m silver medal at the World Youth Championships in Athletics the following year. She won the bronze medal in the 1500 m at the 2005 Asian Championships in Athletics and went one better at the 2006 Asian Games by taking the silver medal in Doha. Kobayashi moved up to specialise in longer distances and ran the 5000 m at the 2008 Beijing Olympics after becoming the Japanese national champion in the event.

She gave the best performance by an Asian runner in the women's 5000 m at the 2009 World Championships in Athletics, finishing in eleventh and beating her domestic rival Yurika Nakamura. Kobayashi ended her season with a 5000 m gold medal at the 2009 East Asian Games. She was selected to represent Asia/Pacific at the 2010 IAAF Continental Cup, but managed only eighth place in the 3000 m. The following January, she ran for Hyōgo at the 2011 Women's Inter-Prefectural Ekiden and set a new stage record in her section, although the team finished in ninth position overall. She was the bronze medalist in the 5000 m at the 2011 Asian Athletics Championships in Kobe, one place behind her compatriot Hitomi Niiya. At the International Chiba Ekiden in November she won the first women's stage for Japan, setting a race record for her leg, and the mixed team went on to finish a close second behind Kenya.

== International competitions ==
Year	Competition	Venue	Position	Event	Notes
Representing Japan
2004	World Junior Championships	Grosseto, Italy	16th (heats)	800 m	2:07.56
2005	World Youth Championships	Marrakesh, Morocco	2nd	1500 m	4:13.96
2005	Asian Championships	Incheon, South Korea	3rd	1500 m	4:14.15
2006	World Cross Country Championships	Fukuoka, Japan	30th	Short race (4 km)	13:34
2006	World Junior Championships	Beijing, China	3rd	1500 m	4:12.88
2006	Asian Games	Doha, Qatar	2nd	1500 m	4:14.96
2008	Summer Olympics	Beijing, China	16th (heats)	5000 m	15:15.87
2009	World Championships	Berlin, Germany	11th	5000 m	15:12.44
2009	East Asian Games	Hong Kong, China	1st	5000 m	16:46.86

== Personal bests ==
- 800 metres – 2:05.78 min (2006)
- 1500 metres – 4:07.86 min (2006)
- 3000 metres – 8:51.85 min (2008)
- 5000 metres – 15:07.37 min (2008)
