= Athletics at the 2002 Asian Games – Women's 5000 metres =

Women's 5000 metres at the 2002 Asian Games
- Venue: Busan Asiad Main Stadium
- Dates: 12 October 2002
- Competitors: 8 from 5 nations

Medalists
gold medal	Sun Yingjie	China
silver medal	Kayoko Fukushi	Japan
bronze medal	Sunita Rani	India

The women's 5000 metres competition at the 2002 Asian Games in Busan, South Korea was held on 12 October at the Busan Asiad Main Stadium.

On October 13, 2002, Japanese news agency Kyodo News reported that Sunita Rani of India had tested positive for a banned substance, which was later confirmed by Lee Choon-Sup, Deputy Secretary General of the Busan Asian Games Organizing Committee; an unofficial report stated that the substance was the anabolic steroid nandrolone. The Indian Chef de Mission at the Games backed Sunita—who denied using any banned drug—and asked for a "B" sample test from Bangkok, but tests were run only at the Asian Games’ Doping Control Center (AGDCC) in Seoul (the laboratory accredited by the IOC). On October 16, the AGDCC confirmed the steroid nandrolone in Sunita's urine sample; as a consequence, the OCA stripped her medal. The Indian Olympic Association (IOA) requested the intervention of the International Association of Athletics Federations and the IOC; the samples were jointly reexamined by the World Anti-Doping Agency and the IOC Sub-Commission on Doping and Biochemistry of Sport. In January 2003, the OCA announced that the IOC Medical Director had cleared Sunita of the doping charge and that appropriate action would be taken against the AGDCC. Her medal was reinstated on February 4, 2003, in a ceremony attended by the Secretary General of OCA Randhir Singh and the president of the IOA Suresh Kalmadi.

== Schedule ==
All times are Korea Standard Time (UTC+09:00)

Date	Time	Event
Saturday, 12 October 2002	14:30	Final

== Records ==
Prior to this competition, the existing world, Asian and Games records were as follows.

World Record	Jiang Bo (CHN)	14:28.09	Shanghai, China	23 October 1997
Asian Record	Jiang Bo (CHN)	14:28.09	Shanghai, China	23 October 1997
Games Record	Supriyati Sutono (INA)	15:54.45	Bangkok, Thailand	18 December 1998

== Results ==
Rank	Athlete	Time	Notes
1st place, gold medalist(s)	Sun Yingjie (CHN)	14:40.41	GR
2nd place, silver medalist(s)	Kayoko Fukushi (JPN)	14:55.19	
3rd place, bronze medalist(s)	Sunita Rani (IND)	15:18.77	
4	Yoshiko Ichikawa (JPN)	15:32.61	
5	Xing Huina (CHN)	15:47.52	
6	Maggie Chan (HKG)	15:49.91	
7	Chung Yun-hee (KOR)	16:12.65	
8	Chang Jin-sook (KOR)	16:15.68	
