= Kiyoko Shimahara =

Japanese long-distance runner

Personal information
- Native name: 嶋原 清子
- Full name: Kiyoko Shimahara
- Nationality: Japanese
- Born: December 22, 1976 (age 49) Suō-Ōshima, Yamaguchi Prefecture, Japan
- Height: 1.54 m (5 ft 1 in)
- Weight: 43 kg (95 lb)

Sport
- Sport: Track and field
- Event: Marathon
Medal record
Women's athletics
Representing Japan
Asian Games
Silver medal – second place	2006 Doha	Marathon
World Championships
Silver medal – second place	2007 World Championships	Marathon

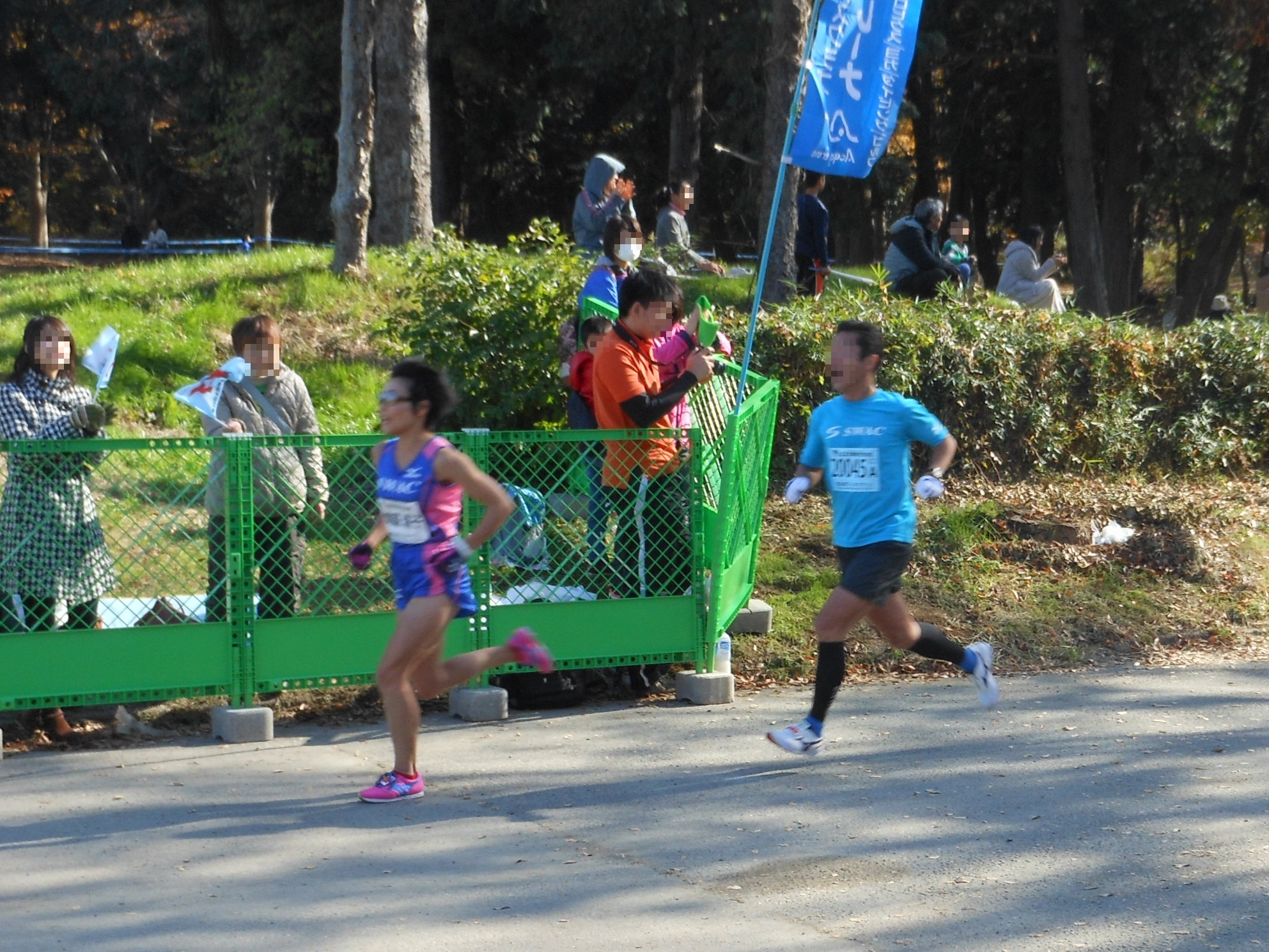
The last scene of Tsukuba marathon 10km.Showing Kiyoko Shimahara by the left hand.

Kiyoko Shimahara (嶋原 清子; born 22 December 1976) is a Japanese long-distance runner who competes in marathon races. Her personal best time is 2:25:10 hours, achieved in August 2009 in Sapporo. She is a member of the Second Wind running club in Japan. She represented her country at the 2007 World Championships in Athletics and at the Asian Games in 2006 and 2010 (winning the silver medal at the former edition).

Born in the Ōshima District in Yamaguchi Prefecture, she attended Kokushikan University and graduated in 1999 with a degree in physical education. She made her debut over the marathon distance at the Japanese student championships in 1997. Her first marathon victory came at the 2003 Katsuta Marathon, where she ran a course record time of 2:31:10 hours.

She came third at the Tokyo Marathon in 2003, then improved to second place behind Bruna Genovese at the same competition the following year, setting a personal best of 2:26:43 hours in the process. Shimahara improved further at the 2005 Hokkaido Marathon, running 2:26:14 and taking the runner-up spot. In 2006, opened her season with a personal best of 1:10:16 hours at the Miyazaki Half Marathon, then came third at the Osaka Ladies Marathon. She made her foreign debut at the Boston Marathon, where she finished in fifth place. She gained her first international call-up for Japan at the 2006 Asian Games and she was the marathon silver medallist behind China's Zhou Chunxiu.

These performances led to her being selected for the Japanese women's marathon squad at the 2007 World Championships in Athletics. She finished sixth at the World Championships Marathon in Osaka. At the 2007 London Marathon, she withdrew mid-race for the first time, pulling up just after the halfway point due to breathing difficulties. At the start of 2008 she came eleventh at the Nagoya Marathon, but rebounded at the Chicago Marathon with a third-place finish to reach the podium. Shimahara ended her year with a win at the Honolulu Marathon in a time of 2:32:36 hours.

Despite a sixth-place finish at the Tokyo Marathon, the 2009 season proved to be one of Shimahara's most successful. She won the Osaka Half Marathon then set a course record and personal best of 2:25:10 hours to win at the Hokkaido Marathon in Sapporo. She was the runner-up at both the Yokohama Marathon and the Honolulu race that year. Shimahara was fourth at the 2010 Nagano Marathon and was selected to compete for Japan at the 2010 Asian Games in Guangzhou. However, she did not win a medal on her second performance at the Games, finishing fifth overall.

In 2011, she was the runner-up at the Hokkaido Marathon and the inaugural Osaka Marathon. She also ran at the Tokyo Marathon that year but placed fifteenth in that race. She had only one outing in 2012: at the Osaka Marathon she came fifth in a time of 2:29:51 hours. A year passed before she returned to competition, again in Osaka, and she managed third on that occasion.

== Achievements ==
Year	Competition	Venue	Position	Event	Notes
Representing Japan
2008	Honolulu Marathon	Honolulu, Hawaii	1st	Marathon	2:32:36
2009	Hokkaido Marathon	Sapporo, Japan	1st	Marathon	2:25:10
