= Wang Qingqing =

Chinese racewalker (born 1983)

Medal record

Women's athletics

Representing China

Asian Games
Gold medal – first place	2002 Busan	20 km walk

Wang Qingqing (Chinese: 王青青; born 7 February 1983) is a Chinese former racewalking athlete who specialised in the 20 kilometres walk. She was the 2002 Asian Games champion in the event.

Born in Shandong, Wang emerged as a national level walker while still a teenager. After finishing in the top twelve in both the 10 km walk and 20 km walk at the 2000 Chinese Athletics Championships, she improved to sixth at the 2001 Chinese Games with a lifetime best of 1:29:44 hours for the 20 km event. In 2002, she ranked in the top five over both walk distance at the national championships.

Her first major international competition was the 2002 Asian Games in Busan. There she entered the women's 20 km walk final and won the gold medal with a time of 1:33:40 hours. Her time was also the fastest ever recorded in South Korea – an achievement which stood until the 2013 World Championships in Athletics was contested in Daegu nine years later.

In spite of her winning the major regional title while still a teenager, this outing proved to be the last major race of her career and she subsequently retired from competition.
