= Athletics at the 2002 Asian Games – Women's 20 kilometres walk =

Women's 20 kilometres walk at the 2002 Asian Games
- Venue: Busan Asiad Main Stadium
- Date: 7 October 2002
- Competitors: 6 from 5 nations

Medalists
| gold medal | Wang Qingqing | China |
| silver medal | Gao Kelian | China |
| bronze medal | Svetlana Tolstaya | Kazakhstan |

The women's 20 kilometres walk competition at the 2002 Asian Games in Busan, South Korea was held on 7 October at the Busan Asiad Main Stadium.

== Schedule ==
All times are Korea Standard Time (UTC+09:00)

| Date | Time | Event |
|---|---|---|
| Monday, 7 October 2002 | 10:30 | Final |

== Records ==
Prior to this competition, the existing world, Asian and Games records were as follows.

| World Record | Wang Yan (CHN) | 1:26:22 | Guangzhou, China | 19 December 2001 |
| Asian Record | Wang Yan (CHN) | 1:26:22 | Guangzhou, China | 19 December 2001 |
| Games Record | — | — | — | — |

== Results ==
| Rank | Athlete | Time | Notes |
|---|---|---|---|
| 1st place, gold medalist(s) | Wang Qingqing (CHN) | 1:33:40 | GR |
| 2nd place, silver medalist(s) | Gao Kelian (CHN) | 1:33:59 | |
| 3rd place, bronze medalist(s) | Svetlana Tolstaya (KAZ) | 1:35:03 | |
| 4 | Takako Terui (JPN) | 1:36:08 | |
| 5 | Kim Mi-jung (KOR) | 1:36:55 | |
| 6 | Yuan Yufang (MAS) | 1:37:08 | |
