= Wang Hao (race walker) =

Chinese racewalker

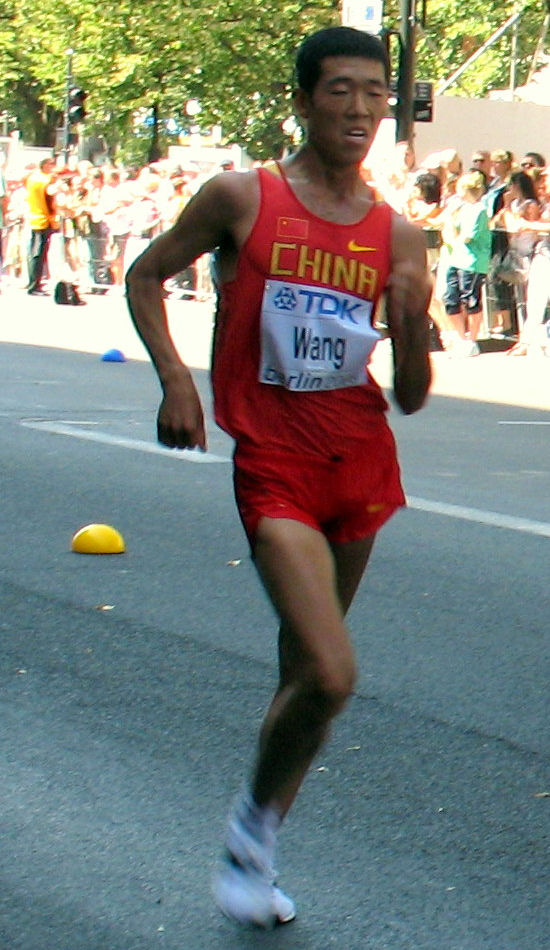

Personal information
- Nationality: Chinese
- Born: August 16, 1989 (age 36) Inner Mongolia

Sport
- Country: China
- Sport: Track and field
- Event: 20 km racewalk
- Coached by: Sandro Damilano
Medal record
Men's Athletics
Representing China
World Championships
Gold medal – first place	2009 Berlin	20 km walk
Asian Games
Gold medal – first place	2010 Guangzhou	20 km walk

Wang Hao (Chinese: 王浩) (born August 16, 1989, in Inner Mongolia) is a Chinese race walker.

== Biography ==
In August 2008 he finished fourth in the 20 km race walk event at the 2008 Summer Olympics, in a new personal best time of 1:19:47 hours. He missed out on the bronze medal by a margin of five seconds.

On 23 October 2008 he set a new world junior record over 10 km walk, with 39:32 minutes. The previous record of 39:57 minutes was set by Aleksey Bartsaykin of Russia earlier in 2008.

On August 15, 2009, he won the silver medal at the 20 kilometres walk in the 2009 World Championships in Berlin, setting a personal best of 1:19:06 in the process. By winning silver in the 20 km walk, Wang Hao became China's third ever male athlete to win a medal in the history of the IAAF World Championships, after former men's high jump world record holder Zhu Jianhua, who won bronze in the 1983 World Championships, and hurdler Liu Xiang, who won a bronze in 2003, silver in 2005 and gold in 2007.

He won two medals at the 11th Chinese National Games in 2009: a gold in the 20 km walk and a silver in the 50 km walk, finishing behind Zhao Chengliang in the latter event.

== See also ==
- China at the World Championships in Athletics
