= Athletics at the 2006 Asian Games – Women's shot put =

Women's shot put at the 2006 Asian Games
- Venue: Khalifa International Stadium
- Date: 9 December 2006
- Competitors: 7 from 6 nations

Medalists
gold medal	Li Ling	China
silver medal	Li Meiju	China
bronze medal	Lin Chia-ying	Chinese Taipei

The women's shot put competition at the 2006 Asian Games in Doha, Qatar was held on 9 December 2006 at the Khalifa International Stadium.

== Schedule ==
All times are Arabia Standard Time (UTC+03:00)

Date	Time	Event
Saturday, 9 December 2006	17:00	Final

== Records ==
Prior to this competition, the existing world, Asian and Games records were as follows.

World Record	Natalya Lisovskaya (URS)	22.63	Moscow, Soviet Union	7 June 1987
Asian Record	Li Meisu (CHN)	21.76	Shijiazhuang, China	23 April 1988
Games Record	Sui Xinmei (CHN)	20.55	Beijing, China	1 October 1990

== Results ==
Rank	Athlete	Attempt						Result	Notes
Rank	Athlete	1	2	3	4	5	6	Result	Notes
1st place, gold medalist(s)	Li Ling (CHN)	17.90	18.42	17.54	X	X	18.08	18.42	
2nd place, silver medalist(s)	Li Meiju (CHN)	18.08	X	X	X	X	X	18.08	
3rd place, bronze medalist(s)	Lin Chia-ying (TPE)	15.88	16.08	X	16.45	X	16.70	16.70	
4	Lee Mi-young (KOR)	14.15	14.79	16.48	16.33	16.28	16.68	16.68	
5	Iolanta Ulyeva (KAZ)	15.17	15.57	16.39	15.61	15.53	X	16.39	
6	Nadeeka Muthunayaka (SRI)	13.47	13.94	13.60	13.86	X	13.33	13.94	
7	Asmaa Fathalla (KUW)	7.42	X	8.50	8.16	7.36	X	8.50	
