= Han Ling =

Chinese sprinter (born 1985)

Medal record

Women's athletics

Representing China

Asian Indoor Championships
Gold medal – first place	2010 Tehran	60 m

Han Ling 韩玲 (born 27 October 1985 in Bobai, Guangxi) is a female Chinese sprinter who specializes in the 200 metres.

At the 2006 Asian Games she finished fourth in the 200 metres, won a gold medal in the 4 × 100 m relay and a bronze medal in the 4 × 400 m relay.

She represented her country in the 4 x 400 metres relay event at the 2008 Summer Olympics. She won the relay gold medal for Guangxi at the 11th Chinese National Games in 2009.

Han has also competed in the 60 metres, having finished fourth at the 2007 Asian Indoor Games and won the silver medal behind compatriot Jiang Lan at the 2010 Asian Indoor Athletics Championships.

Her personal best time is 23.41 seconds, achieved in August 2006 in Shijiazhuang. In the 100 metres she has 11.96 seconds, achieved in June 2006 in Korat.
