= Sunita Rani =

Indian athlete (born 1979)

Personal information
- Born: 4 December 1979 (age 46) Sunam, Punjab, India

Sport
- Country: India
- Sport: Athletics

Achievements and titles
- Personal bests: 800 m: 2:02.15 (New Delhi, 2000); 1500 m: 4:06.03 (Busan, 2002) NR; 5000 m: 15:18.77 (Busan, 2002)
Medal record
Women's athletics
Representing India
Asian Games
Gold medal – first place	2002 Busan	1500 m
Silver medal – second place	1998 Bangkok	5000 m
Bronze medal – third place	1998 Bangkok	1500 m
Bronze medal – third place	2002 Busan	5000 m

Sunita Rani (Hindi: सुनीता रानी; born 4 December 1979) is an Indian athlete from Punjab who won a gold medal in the 1,500 m race and a bronze in the 5,000 m during the 2002 Asian Games. Her time of 4:06.03 in the 1,500 metres remains the Asian Games record and stood as the Indian national record, until it was surpassed in 2024. She received the Arjuna award in 1999 and the Padma Shri in 2015 for her achievements. She later raised controversy when she was charged with doping. Her medals were revoked but subsequently reinstated after an investigation.

== Life and career ==
Rani hails from Sunam, Punjab and is best known for her performance at the 2002 Asian Games, where she won a gold medal in the 1,500 m race and a bronze in the 5,000 m.

=== Controversy ===
Rani was hit with controversy about her performance at the 2002 Asian Games in Busan, South Korea, after she tested positive for nandrolone, a banned substance that aids recovery, strength, and endurance. Both her medals were revoked. The Indian Olympic Association fought to prove that the doping tests had major procedural irregularities and that the results were not valid. Rani has categorically maintained that she had not taken any banned substances. She had also cleared the dope test in Delhi, on the eve of the Indian team's departure to Busan.

The Olympic Council of Asia later officially admitted that there had been discrepancies in her drug test. On 3 January 2003, the International Association of Athletics Federations officially cleared Rani of doping charges and reinstated her medals. The Amateur Athletic Federation of India held a 'Restoration of Medals' ceremony on 4 February 2003, to officially return Rani's medals.
