= Athletics at the 2006 Asian Games – Women's marathon =

Women's marathon at the 2006 Asian Games
- Venue: Doha Corniche
- Date: 9 December 2006
- Competitors: 10 from 6 nations

Medalists
gold medal	Zhou Chunxiu	China
silver medal	Kiyoko Shimahara	Japan
bronze medal	Kayoko Obata	Japan

The women's marathon competition at the 2006 Asian Games in Doha, Qatar was held on 9 December 2006 at the Marathon Street Circuit in Doha Corniche.

== Schedule ==
All times are Arabia Standard Time (UTC+03:00)

Date	Time	Event
Saturday, 9 December 2006	09:10	Final

== Records ==
Prior to this competition, the existing world, Asian and Games records were as follows.

World Record	Paula Radcliffe (GBR)	2:15:25	London, United Kingdom	13 April 2003
Asian Record	Mizuki Noguchi (JPN)	2:19:12	Berlin, Germany	25 September 2005
Games Record	Naoko Takahashi (JPN)	2:21:47	Bangkok, Thailand	6 December 1998

== Results ==
Legend

- DNF — Did not finish

Rank	Athlete	Time	Notes
1st place, gold medalist(s)	Zhou Chunxiu (CHN)	2:27:03	
2nd place, silver medalist(s)	Kiyoko Shimahara (JPN)	2:30:34	
3rd place, bronze medalist(s)	Kayoko Obata (JPN)	2:30:38	
4	Jo Bun-hui (PRK)	2:42:34	
5	Choi Kyong-hee (KOR)	2:44:20	
6	Jong Yong-ok (PRK)	2:48:49	
7	Kim Eun-jung (KOR)	2:54:33	
8	Luvsanlkhündegiin Otgonbayar (MGL)	2:59:55	
9	Ci Wang (CHN)	3:08:10	
—	Maria-Pia Nehmé (LIB)	DNF	
