= Athletics at the 2006 Asian Games – Women's 200 metres =

Women's 200 metres at the 2006 Asian Games
- Venue: Khalifa International Stadium
- Dates: 10–11 December 2006
- Competitors: 18 from 13 nations

Medalists
gold medal	Ruqaya Al-Ghasra	Bahrain
silver medal	Guzel Khubbieva	Uzbekistan
bronze medal	Susanthika Jayasinghe	Sri Lanka

The women's 200 metres competition at the 2006 Asian Games in Doha, Qatar was held on 10 and 11 December 2006 at the Khalifa International Stadium.

== Schedule ==
All times are Arabia Standard Time (UTC+03:00)

Date	Time	Event
Sunday, 10 December 2006	09:20	1st round
Monday, 11 December 2006	16:10	Final

== Records ==
Prior to this competition, the existing world, Asian and Games records were as follows.

World Record	Florence Griffith Joyner (USA)	21.34	Seoul, South Korea	29 September 1988
Asian Record	Li Xuemei (CHN)	22.01	Shanghai, China	22 October 1997
Games Record	Damayanthi Dharsha (SRI)	22.48	Bangkok, Thailand	18 December 1998

== Results ==
Legend

- DNS — Did not start

=== 1st round ===
- Qualification: First 2 in each heat (Q) and the next 2 fastest (q) advance to the final.

==== Heat 1 ====
- Wind: +0.9 m/s

Rank	Athlete	Time	Notes
1	Guzel Khubbieva (UZB)	23.54	Q
2	Sakie Nobuoka (JPN)	24.26	Q
3	Sujani Buddika (SRI)	24.68	
4	Chitra Soman (IND)	24.74	
5	Dana Hussein (IRQ)	25.61	
6	Alaa Al-Saffar (KUW)	28.37	

==== Heat 2 ====
- Wind: +0.4 m/s

Rank	Athlete	Time	Notes
1	Susanthika Jayasinghe (SRI)	23.53	Q
2	Han Ling (CHN)	23.82	Q
3	Vũ Thị Hương (VIE)	23.96	q
4	Maryam Tousi (IRI)	25.23	
5	Faten Abdulnabi (BRN)	25.69	
6	Philippa Armentrout (HKG)	26.28	

==== Heat 3 ====
- Wind: +0.9 m/s

Rank	Athlete	Time	Notes
1	Ruqaya Al-Ghasra (BRN)	23.42	Q
2	Takarako Nakamura (JPN)	23.89	Q
3	Chen Jue (CHN)	24.19	q
4	Gretta Taslakian (LIB)	25.02	
5	Leung Hau Sze (HKG)	25.18	
6	Supavadee Khawpeag (THA)	25.36	

=== Final ===
- Wind: −0.7 m/s

Rank	Athlete	Time	Notes
1st place, gold medalist(s)	Ruqaya Al-Ghasra (BRN)	23.19	
2nd place, silver medalist(s)	Guzel Khubbieva (UZB)	23.30	
3rd place, bronze medalist(s)	Susanthika Jayasinghe (SRI)	23.42	
4	Han Ling (CHN)	23.66	
5	Takarako Nakamura (JPN)	23.89	
6	Sakie Nobuoka (JPN)	23.98	
7	Chen Jue (CHN)	24.17	
—	Vũ Thị Hương (VIE)	DNS	
