= Xue Fei (runner) =

Chinese long-distance runner

- 薛飞
- Pronunciation: Xuē Fēi
- Born: August 8, 1989 (age 36); Shandong, China
- Occupation: Long-distance runner
- Awards: 2006 World Junior Championships, 2006 Asian Games

Xue Fei (Chinese: 薛飞; pinyin: Xuē Fēi; born 8 August 1989 in Shandong) is a female Chinese long-distance runner who specializes in the 5000 metres.

She won the 2006 World Junior Championships and the 2006 Asian Games. She also competed at the 2008 World Indoor Championships without reaching the final. She will represent her country at the 2008 Summer Olympics.

== Personal bests ==
- 1500 metres - 4:08.87 min (2008)
- 5000 metres - 15:02.73 min (2007)
- 10,000 metres - 32:29.12 min (2007)
