= Athletics at the 2006 Asian Games – Women's triple jump =

Women's triple jump at the 2006 Asian Games
- Venue: Khalifa International Stadium
- Dates: 11 December 2006
- Competitors: 9 from 8 nations

Medalists
gold medal	Xie Limei	China
silver medal	Anastasiya Juravleva	Uzbekistan
bronze medal	Li Qian	China

The women's triple jump competition at the 2006 Asian Games in Doha, Qatar was held on 11 December 2006 at the Khalifa International Stadium.

== Schedule ==
All times are Arabia Standard Time (UTC+03:00)

Date	Time	Event
Monday, 11 December 2006	15:00	Final

== Records ==
Prior to this competition, the existing world, Asian and Games records were as follows.

World Record	Inessa Kravets (UKR)	15.50	Gothenburg, Sweden	10 August 1995
Asian Record	Huang Qiuyan (CHN)	14.72	Guangzhou, China	22 November 2001
Games Record	Huang Qiuyan (CHN)	14.28	Busan, South Korea	13 October 2002

== Results ==
Legend

- DNS — Did not start

Rank	Athlete	Attempt						Result	Notes
Rank	Athlete	1	2	3	4	5	6	Result	Notes
1st place, gold medalist(s)	Xie Limei (CHN)	X	13.74 +0.1	14.12 −0.3	14.37 +1.8	14.00 −0.2	13.43 +0.5	14.37	GR
2nd place, silver medalist(s)	Anastasiya Juravleva (UZB)	14.03 −1.1	14.26 −0.6	X	X	13.69 −0.4	13.93 −1.8	14.26	
3rd place, bronze medalist(s)	Li Qian (CHN)	13.69 +0.5	13.38 −0.1	13.78 +0.3	13.60 +2.9	13.56 +1.2	X	13.78	
4	Ngew Sin Mei (MAS)	13.48 +1.7	13.60 +1.7	13.48 +1.2	13.29; 0.0	X	13.36 −0.4	13.60	
5	Yelena Parfyonova (KAZ)	13.54 −0.3	X	13.28 +0.9	13.44 −0.4	13.45 +1.5	X	13.54	
6	Rahima Sardi (KGZ)	12.75 −0.3	12.32; 0.0	12.86 +0.6	X	X	X	12.86	
7	Kim Su-yeon (KOR)	X	X	X	12.82 +1.7	12.55 +3.0	X	12.82	
8	Fadwa Al-Bouza (SYR)	11.96 +0.1	11.97 +0.7	X	X	11.85 +1.0	X	11.97	
—	Anju Bobby George (IND)							DNS	
