= Athletics at the 2006 Asian Games – Men's 10,000 metres =

Men's 10,000 metres at the 2006 Asian Games
- Venue: Khalifa International Stadium
- Dates: 9 December 2006
- Competitors: 9 from 6 nations

Medalists
gold medal	Hasan Mahboob	Bahrain
silver medal	Essa Ismail Rashed	Qatar
bronze medal	Aadam Ismaeel Khamis	Bahrain

The men's 10000 metres competition at the 2006 Asian Games in Doha, Qatar was held on 9 December 2006 at the Khalifa International Stadium.

== Schedule ==
All times are Arabia Standard Time (UTC+03:00)

Date	Time	Event
Saturday, 9 December 2006	19:10	Final

== Records ==
Prior to this competition, the existing world, Asian and Games records were as follows.

World Record	Kenenisa Bekele (ETH)	26:17.53	Brussels, Belgium	26 August 2005
Asian Record	Ahmad Hassan Abdullah (QAT)	26:38.76	Brussels, Belgium	5 September 2003
Games Record	Toshinari Takaoka (JPN)	28:15.48	Hiroshima, Japan	10 October 1994

== Results ==
Rank	Athlete	Time	Notes
1st place, gold medalist(s)	Hasan Mahboob (BRN)	27:58.88	GR
2nd place, silver medalist(s)	Essa Ismail Rashed (QAT)	27:59.15	
3rd place, bronze medalist(s)	Aadam Ismaeel Khamis (BRN)	28:02.08	
4	Ahmad Hassan Abdullah (QAT)	28:05.47	
5	Terukazu Omori (JPN)	29:10.73	
6	Surendra Singh (IND)	29:23.37	
7	Eom Hyo-suk (KOR)	30:33.05	
8	Boonthung Srisung (THA)	30:40.47	
9	Jeon Eun-hoi (KOR)	31:19.34	
