= Athletics at the 2006 Asian Games – Men's 20 kilometres walk =

Men's 20 kilometres walk at the 2006 Asian Games
- Venue: Doha Corniche
- Date: 7 December 2006
- Competitors: 8 from 6 nations

Medalists
gold medal	Han Yucheng	China
silver medal	Kim Hyun-sub	South Korea
bronze medal	Koichiro Morioka	Japan

The men's 20 kilometres walk competition at the 2006 Asian Games in Doha, Qatar was held on 7 December 2006 at the Marathon Street Circuit in Doha Corniche.

== Schedule ==
All times are Arabia Standard Time (UTC+03:00)

Date	Time	Event
Thursday, 7 December 2006	08:10	Final

== Records ==
Prior to this competition, the existing world, Asian and Games records were as follows.

World Record	Jefferson Pérez (ECU)	1:17:21	Paris, France	23 August 2005
Asian Record	Zhu Hongjun (CHN)	1:17:41	Cixi, China	23 April 2005
Games Record	Yu Guohui (CHN)	1:20:25	Bangkok, Thailand	13 December 1998

== Results ==
Legend

- DNS — Did not start

Rank	Athlete	Time	Notes
1st place, gold medalist(s)	Han Yucheng (CHN)	1:21:41	
2nd place, silver medalist(s)	Kim Hyun-sub (KOR)	1:23:12	
3rd place, bronze medalist(s)	Koichiro Morioka (JPN)	1:23:17	
4	Yuki Yamazaki (JPN)	1:26:00	
5	Rustam Kuvatov (KAZ)	1:27:16	
6	Mabrook Saleh Mohamed (QAT)	1:27:34	
7	Waleed Ahmed Al-Sabahy (QAT)	1:37:22	
—	Shokirjon Irmatov (TJK)	DNS	
