= Athletics at the 2006 Asian Games – Men's 3000 metres steeplechase =

Men's 3000 metres steeplechase at the 2006 Asian Games
- Venue: Khalifa International Stadium
- Dates: 8 December 2006
- Competitors: 12 from 10 nations

Medalists
gold medal	Tareq Mubarak Taher	Bahrain
silver medal	Gamal Belal Salem	Qatar
bronze medal	Lin Xiangqian	China

The men's 3000 metres steeplechase competition at the 2006 Asian Games in Doha, Qatar was held on 8 December 2006 at the Khalifa International Stadium.

== Schedule ==
All times are Arabia Standard Time (UTC+03:00)

Date	Time	Event
Friday, 8 December 2006	20:00	Final

== Records ==
Prior to this competition, the existing world, Asian and Games records were as follows.

World Record	Saif Saaeed Shaheen (QAT)	7:53.63	Brussels, Belgium	3 September 2004
Asian Record	Saif Saaeed Shaheen (QAT)	7:53.63	Brussels, Belgium	3 September 2004
Games Record	Khamis Abdullah Saifeldin (QAT)	8:30.52	Busan, South Korea	9 October 2002

== Results ==
Legend

- DNF — Did not finish
- DNS — Did not start

Rank	Athlete	Time	Notes
1st place, gold medalist(s)	Tareq Mubarak Taher (BRN)	8:26.85	GR
2nd place, silver medalist(s)	Gamal Belal Salem (QAT)	8:29.10	
3rd place, bronze medalist(s)	Lin Xiangqian (CHN)	8:30.49	
4	Ali Al-Amri (KSA)	8:41.29	
5	Thamer Kamal Ali (QAT)	8:43.02	
6	Rene Herrera (PHI)	9:05.70	
7	Qais Al-Mahrooqi (OMA)	9:09.26	
8	Wu Wen-chien (TPE)	9:12.31	
9	Omar Al-Rasheedi (KUW)	9:18.91	
10	Elias de Deus (TLS)	10:06.27	
—	Ajmal Amirov (TJK)	DNF	
—	Majed Saleh Basheer (BRN)	DNS	
