= Athletics at the 2006 Asian Games – Men's 5000 metres =

Men's 5000 metres at the 2006 Asian Games
- Venue: Khalifa International Stadium
- Dates: 12 December 2006
- Competitors: 17 from 12 nations

Medalists
gold medal	James Kwalia	Qatar
silver medal	Mushir Salem Jawher	Bahrain
bronze medal	Sultan Khamis Zaman	Qatar

The men's 5000 metres competition at the 2006 Asian Games in Doha, Qatar was held on 12 December 2006 at the Khalifa International Stadium.

== Schedule ==
All times are Arabia Standard Time (UTC+03:00)

Date	Time	Event
Tuesday, 12 December 2006	17:55	Final

== Records ==
Prior to this competition, the existing world, Asian and Games records were as follows.

World Record	Kenenisa Bekele (ETH)	12:37.35	Hengelo, Netherlands	31 May 2004
Asian Record	Saif Saaeed Shaheen (QAT)	12:51.98	Rome, Italy	14 July 2006
Games Record	Toshinari Takaoka (JPN)	13:38.37	Hiroshima, Japan	16 October 1994

== Results ==
Legend

- DNS — Did not start

Rank	Athlete	Time	Notes
1st place, gold medalist(s)	James Kwalia (QAT)	13:38.90	
2nd place, silver medalist(s)	Mushir Salem Jawher (BRN)	13:41.10	
3rd place, bronze medalist(s)	Sultan Khamis Zaman (QAT)	13:45.91	
4	Kazuhiro Maeda (JPN)	13:56.16	
5	Sunil Kumar (IND)	13:58.50	
6	Surendra Singh (IND)	13:59.05	
7	Boonthung Srisung (THA)	14:13.33	
8	Nader Al-Masri (PLE)	14:24.81	
9	Denis Bagrev (KGZ)	14:27.67	
10	Ajmal Amirov (TJK)	14:40.35	
11	Eom Hyo-suk (KOR)	14:56.60	
12	Jeon Eun-hoi (KOR)	14:57.79	
13	Hem Bunting (CAM)	15:19.25	
14	Saysana Bannavong (LAO)	16:23.83	
—	Ali Al-Amri (KSA)	DNS	
—	Mohannad Mustafa (PLE)	DNS	
—	Rashid Ramzi (BRN)	DNS	
