= Athletics at the 2006 Asian Games – Women's 100 metres =

Women's 100 metres at the 2006 Asian Games
- Venue: Khalifa International Stadium
- Dates: 8–9 December 2006
- Competitors: 21 from 14 nations

Medalists
gold medal	Guzel Khubbieva	Uzbekistan
silver medal	Susanthika Jayasinghe	Sri Lanka
bronze medal	Ruqaya Al-Ghasra	Bahrain

The women's 100 metres competition at the 2006 Asian Games in Doha, Qatar was held on 8 and 9 December 2006 at the Khalifa International Stadium.

== Schedule ==
All times are Arabia Standard Time (UTC+03:00)

Date	Time	Event
Friday, 8 December 2006	17:00	1st round
Saturday, 9 December 2006	18:15	Final

== Records ==
Prior to this competition, the existing world, Asian and Games records were as follows.

World Record	Florence Griffith Joyner (USA)	10.49	Indianapolis, United States	16 July 1988
Asian Record	Li Xuemei (CHN)	10.79	Shanghai, China	18 October 1997
Games Record	Susanthika Jayasinghe (SRI)	11.15	Busan, South Korea	8 October 2002

== Results ==
=== 1st round ===
- Qualification: First 2 in each heat (Q) and the next 2 fastest (q) advance to the final.

==== Heat 1 ====
- Wind: −0.5 m/s

Rank	Athlete	Time	Notes
1	Guzel Khubbieva (UZB)	11.38	Q
2	Ruqaya Al-Ghasra (BRN)	11.40	Q
3	Momoko Takahashi (JPN)	11.91	q
4	Lin Yi-chun (TPE)	12.11	
5	Nongnuch Sanrat (THA)	12.16	
6	Gretta Taslakian (LIB)	12.34	
7	Chan Ho Yee (HKG)	12.40	

==== Heat 2 ====
- Wind: +0.1 m/s

Rank	Athlete	Time	Notes
1	Vũ Thị Hương (VIE)	11.51	Q
2	Qin Wangping (CHN)	11.64	Q
3	Saori Kitakaze (JPN)	11.86	q
4	Faten Abdulnabi (BRN)	12.18	
5	Wan Kin Yee (HKG)	12.18	
6	Walentina Nazarowa (TKM)	12.31	
7	Abeer Al-Jabri (OMA)	13.73	

==== Heat 3 ====
- Wind: +0.2 m/s

Rank	Athlete	Time	Notes
1	Susanthika Jayasinghe (SRI)	11.50	Q
2	Wang Jing (CHN)	11.80	Q
3	Orranut Klomdee (THA)	11.93	
4	Chuang Shu-chuan (TPE)	11.95	
5	Dana Hussein (IRQ)	12.44	
6	Hanan Al-Harrasi (OMA)	13.08	
7	Alaa Al-Saffar (KUW)	13.40	

=== Final ===
- Wind: +0.2 m/s

Rank	Athlete	Time	Notes
1st place, gold medalist(s)	Guzel Khubbieva (UZB)	11.27	
2nd place, silver medalist(s)	Susanthika Jayasinghe (SRI)	11.34	
3rd place, bronze medalist(s)	Ruqaya Al-Ghasra (BRN)	11.40	
4	Vũ Thị Hương (VIE)	11.59	
5	Qin Wangping (CHN)	11.71	
6	Momoko Takahashi (JPN)	11.85	
7	Saori Kitakaze (JPN)	11.94	
8	Wang Jing (CHN)	12.02	
