= Bahrain at the 2006 Asian Games =

- IOC code: BRN
- NOC: Bahrain Olympic Committee

in Doha
- Medals Ranked 14th: Gold 7 Silver 9 Bronze 4 Total 20

Asian Games appearances (overview)
- 1974; 1978; 1982; 1986; 1990; 1994; 1998; 2002; 2006; 2010; 2014; 2018; 2022; 2026

Bahrain participated in the 15th Asian Games, officially known as the XV Asiad held in Doha, Qatar from 1 to 15 December 2006. Bahrain ranked 14th with 7 gold medals in this edition of the Asiad.

== Medalists ==
Medal	Name	Sport	Event	Date
Gold	Tareq Mubarak Taher	Athletics	Men's 3000 metres steeplechase	8
Gold	Hasan Mahboob	Athletics	Men's 10,000 metres	9
Gold	Maryam Yusuf Jamal	Athletics	Women's 800 metres	9
Gold	Tareq Al-Farsani	Bodybuilding	Men's +90 kg	9
Gold	Yusuf Saad Kamel	Athletics	Men's 800 metres	11
Gold	Ruqaya Al-Ghasra	Athletics	Women's 200 metres	11
Gold	Maryam Yusuf Jamal	Athletics	Women's 1500 metres	12
Silver	Kareema Saleh Jasim	Athletics	Women's 10,000 metres	8
Silver	Mohamed Sabah	Bodybuilding	Men's 80 kg	9
Silver	Fadhel Moussa	Bodybuilding	Men's 85 kg	9
Silver	Brandon Simpson	Athletics	Men's 400 metres	10
Silver	Belal Mansoor Ali	Athletics	Men's 1500 metres	10
Silver	Khalid Kamal Yaseen	Athletics	Men's marathon	10
Silver	Mushir Salem Jawher	Athletics	Men's 5000 metres	12
Silver	Nasser Al-Khalifa	Equestrian	Individual endurance	14
Silver	Ahmed Hamad Al-Rowaiei; Duaij Al-Khalifa; Khalid Al-Khalifa; Nasser Al-Khalifa	Equestrian	Team endurance	14
Bronze	Abdulrahim Abdulhameed	Taekwondo	Men's 54 kg	7
Bronze	Aadam Ismaeel Khamis	Athletics	Men's 10,000 metres	9
Bronze	Ruqaya Al-Ghasra	Athletics	Women's 100 metres	9
Bronze	Rashid Ramzi	Athletics	Men's 1500 metres	10
