= Sri Lanka at the 2006 Asian Games =

- IOC code: SRI
- NOC: National Olympic Committee of Sri Lanka

in Doha
- Flag bearer: Manjula Kumara
- Medals Ranked 32nd: Gold 0 Silver 1 Bronze 2 Total 3

Asian Games appearances (overview)
- 1951; 1954; 1958; 1962; 1966; 1970; 1974; 1978; 1982; 1986; 1990; 1994; 1998; 2002; 2006; 2010; 2014; 2018; 2022; 2026

Sri Lanka participated at the 2006 Asian Games, held in Doha, Qatar from December 1 to December 15, 2006. Sri Lanka ranked 32nd with 1 silver medal and 2 bronze medals in this edition of the Asian Games, all from the sports of Athletics.

== Medalists ==
Medal	Name	Sport	Event	Date
Silver	Susanthika Jayasinghe	Athletics	Women's 100 metres	9
Bronze	Susanthika Jayasinghe	Athletics	Women's 200 metres	11
Bronze	Rohan Pradeep Kumara; Rohitha Pushpakumara; Prasanna Amarasekara; Ashoka Jayasundara	Athletics	Men's 4 × 400 metres relay	12
