= Hiromi Ominami =

Japanese long-distance runner

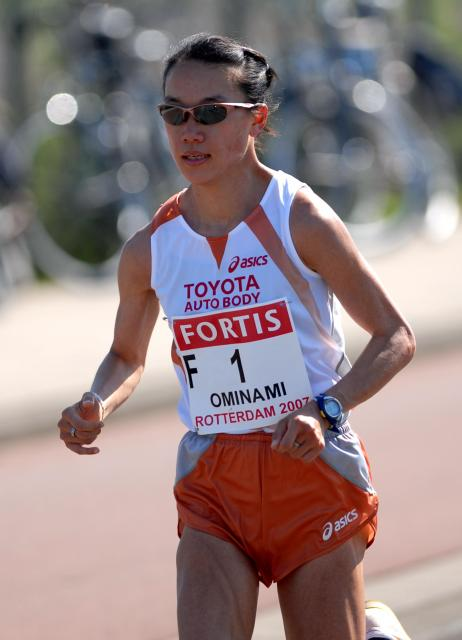
Hiromi Ominami at the 2007 Rotterdam Marathon

Hiromi Ominami (大南 博美, Ōminami Hiromi; born 15 November 1975) is a Japanese long-distance runner. She was born in Wakasa, Fukui. Her twin sister is Takami Ominami, also a world class marathon runner with a personal best of 2:23:43.

== Achievements ==
- All results regarding marathon, unless stated otherwise

Year	Competition	Venue	Position	Notes
Representing Japan
2003	Rotterdam Marathon	Rotterdam, Netherlands	2nd	2:26:17
2004	Osaka Ladies Marathon	Osaka, Japan	3rd	2:27:40
2004	Berlin Marathon	Berlin, Germany	2nd	2:23:26
2006	Miami Marathon	Miami, United States	1st	2:34:11
2007	Rotterdam Marathon	Rotterdam, Netherlands	1st	2:26:36

== Personal bests ==
- 3000 metres - 9:09.72 min (2000)
- 5000 metres - 15:20.75 min (2004)
- 10,000 metres - 31:35.18 min (2005)
- Half marathon - 1:08:45 hrs (2004)
- Marathon - 2:23:26 hrs (2004)
