= Anu Raghavan =

Indian sprinter and hurdler

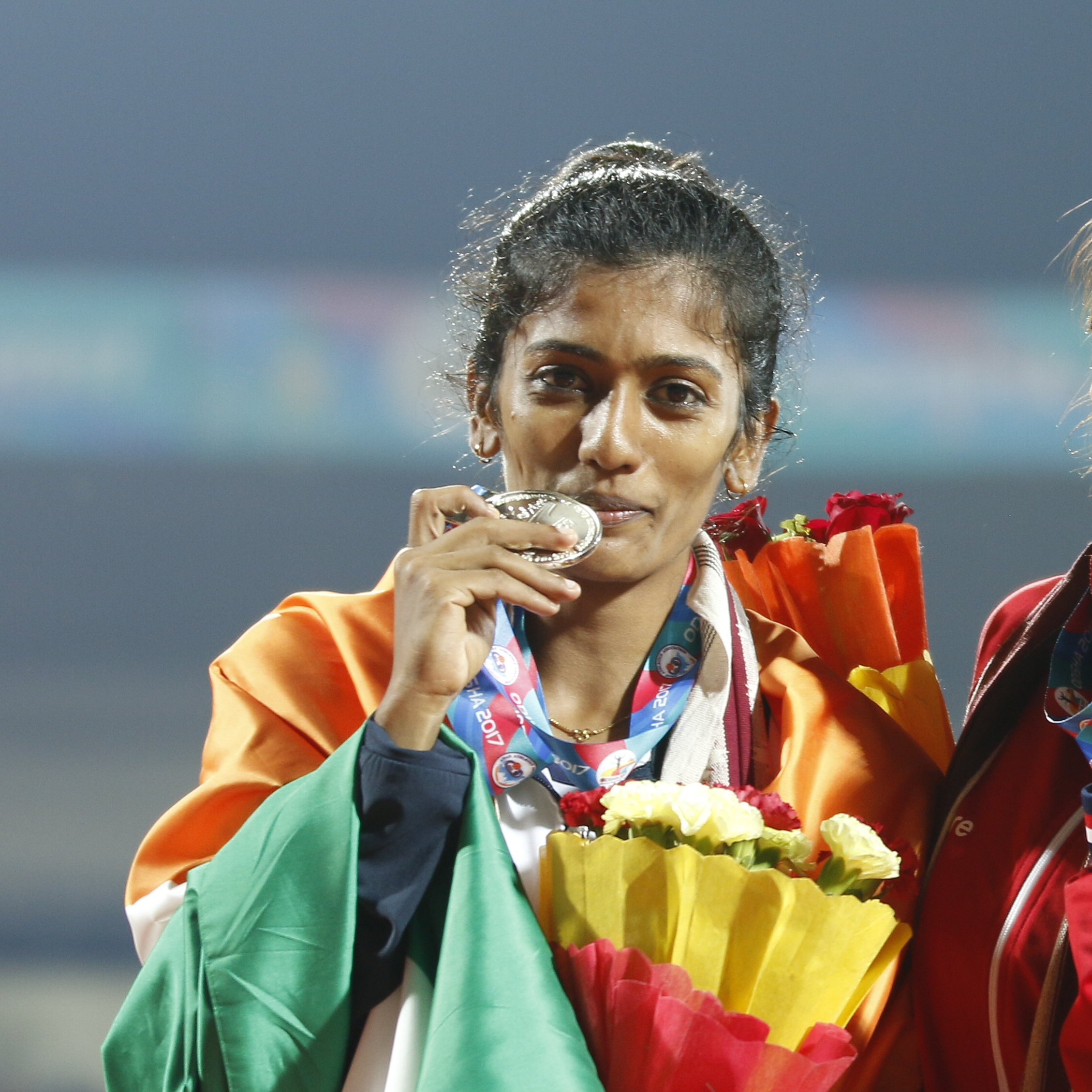
- Anu with the 400m hurdles silver medal at the 2017 Asian Athletics Championships

Personal information
- Born: 20 April 1993 (age 33) Palakkad, Kerala, India

Sport
- Country: India
- Sport: Track and field
- Events: 400 metres, 400 metres hurdles
Medal record
Women's athletics
Representing India
Asian Championships
Silver medal – second place	2017 Bhubaneswar	400m hurdles
Asian Games
Bronze medal – third place	2018 Jakarta-Palembang	400m hurdles

Anu Raghavan (born 20 April 1993) is an Indian sprinter who competes in the 400 metres and 400 metres hurdles events.

In 2016, she filed a case in the Kerala High Court against Athletics Federation of India (AFI), after having been left out of the Indian 4 × 400 metres relay team for the 2016 Summer Olympics, calling it a battle against "corruption and nepotism within the Federation." She stated that she was left out of the Olympics contingent as well as the South Asian Games contingent earlier that year because she "chose to train outside the national camp."

Anu won the silver medal in the 400 metres hurdles event at the 2017 Asian Athletics Championships, clocking a time of 57.22 seconds.

Anu won the bronze medal in the 400 metres hurdles event at the 2018 Asian Games in Jakarta-Palembang where she clocked a timing of 56.92. She was awarded the medal after the Gold medal winner Kemi Adekoya from Bahrain was disqualified due to the consumption of a banned substance.

== Career ==
International Performance
Date	Competition	Event	Country	Category	Race	Position	Result
12 July 2012	2012 World Junior Championships in Athletics	400m Hurdles	Spain	C	H4	7	1:01.14
8 July 2013	Kazan Universiade	400m Hurdles	Russia	B	H1	6	1:02.74
4 June 2015	2015 Asian Athletics Championships	400m Hurdles	China 4	57.79			
6 June 2015	2015 Asian Athletics Championships	400m Hurdles	China	A	F	4	57.79
11 June 2016	Erzurum	400m	Turkey	F	F2	1	55.18
12 June 2016	Erzurum Sprint/Relay Challenge Cup	4x400 Metres Relay	Turkey	F	F	2	3:34.72
18 June 2016	Kędzierzyn-Koźle	400m	Poland	F	F1	1	54.27
24 June 2016	Bydgoszcz	400m	Poland	F	F	4	53.72
7 July 2017	2017 Asian Athletics Championships	400m Hurdles	India	GL	H2	3	58.26
8 July 2017	2017 Asian Athletics Championships	400m Hurdles	India	GL	F	2	57.22
28 July 2018	Czech Athletics Championships	400m Hurdles	Czech Republic	B	H4	3	59.36
15 August 2018	Czech Athletics Championships	400m Hurdles	Czech Republic	F	F	2	57.43
26 August 2018	2018 Asian Games	400m Hurdles	Indonesia	A	H2	3	56.77
27 August 2018	2018 Asian Games	400m Hurdles	Indonesia	A	F	3	56.92
28 September 2026	2026 Asian Games	400m Hurdles	Japan	F	F	5	55.88

Personal Bests
Discipline	Performance	Place	Date	Results Score
200 Metres	25.12	Patiala	28 December 2013	931
400 Metres	53.54	New Delhi	29 April 2016	1067
400 Metres Hurdles	56.77	Jakarta	26 August 2018	1118
4x400 Metres Relay	3:34.72	Erzurum	12 June 2016	1099

== Rio Olympics 2016 ==
Despite being a member of the World Championship 2015, Beijing and Asian Meet 2015 at Wulan, China, Anu was excluded from the 4 x 400 relay team set to represent India at the Rio Olympics 2016. Her petition alleged that the AFI as well as the Sports Authority of India (SAI), based on recommendations made by Yuri Ogorodnik- the national track and field coach- picked a slower and dope-tainted Ashwini Akkunji instead of Anu.

The Rio-bound team consisted of M. R. Poovamma, Nirmala Sheoran, Anilda Thomas and Debashree Mazumdar, with two 'reserve' spots contested by Anu, Akkunji, Priyanka Pawar and Jisna Mathew. The AFI and Ogorodnik later came to the decision that the spots be given away to Mathew and Akkunji.

Claiming injustice, Anu sought legal resort and filed a petition with the Kerala High Court, which later directed the AFI to include Anu in the team. However, the AFI claimed that the last date for inclusion of athletes had already passed. She also said that the AFI cited Akkunji's experience as the criterion for her selection,"but they are defending her with her performance record from six years back".

In November 2015, the AFI also asked Anu to join a national camp, and any athlete who fails to fails to attend the camp would not be considered for the Olympics. Anu, however, pointed out that her post-graduate education would be adversely impacted if she attends the camp, which solicited no response from the AFI.
