= 2013 Asian Athletics Championships – Women's 400 metres =

The women's 400 metres event at the 2013 Asian Athletics Championships was held at the Shree Shiv Chhatrapati Sports Complex. The final took place on 4 July.

== Medalists ==
Gold	Silver	Bronze
Zhao Yanmin; China	M. R. Poovamma; India	Gretta Taslakian; Lebanon

== Results ==
=== Heats ===
First 3 in each heat (Q) and 2 best performers (q) advanced to the final.

Rank	Heat	Name	Nationality	Time	Notes
1	2	M. R. Poovamma	India	53.60	Q
2	1	Anu Mariam Jose	India	53.66	Q
3	1	Yuliya Rakhmanova	Kazakhstan	53.95	Q
4	1	Gretta Taslakian	Lebanon	53.98	Q
4	2	Zhao Yanmin	China	53.98	Q
6	1	Cheng Chong	China	54.10	q
7	1	Chandrika Rasnayake	Sri Lanka	54.16	q
8	2	Nirmala	India	54.62	Q
9	2	Yekaterina Yermak	Kazakhstan	54.66	
10	2	Nining Souhaly	Indonesia	57.14	
11	1	Zakia Sultana	Bangladesh	1:01.62	
12	2	Dil Maya Karki	Nepal	1:01.63	

=== Final ===
Rank	Name	Nationality	Time	Notes
1st place, gold medalist(s)	Zhao Yanmin	China	52.49	
2nd place, silver medalist(s)	M. R. Poovamma	India	53.37	
3rd place, bronze medalist(s)	Gretta Taslakian	Lebanon	53.43	
4	Anu Mariam Jose	India	53.49	
5	Cheng Chong	China	54.25	
6	Yuliya Rakhmanova	Kazakhstan	54.34	
7	Nirmala	India	55.40	
	Chandrika Rasnayake	Sri Lanka	56.88	
