= 2013 Asian Athletics Championships – Women's 4 × 400 metres relay =

The women's 4 × 400 metres relay at the 2013 Asian Athletics Championships was held at the Shiv Chhatrapati Stadium on 7 July.

Rank	Nation	Competitors	Time	Notes
1st place, gold medalist(s)	India	Nirmala, Tintu Luka, Anu Mariam Jose, Poovamma Raju Machettira	3:32.26	
2nd place, silver medalist(s)	China	Chen Lin, Cheng Chong, Geng Qingyu, Zhao Yanmin	3:35.31	
3rd place, bronze medalist(s)	Japan	Asami Chiba, Sayaka Aoki, Satomi Kubokura, Manami Kira	3:35.72	
4	Kazakhstan	Yuliya Rakhmanova, Viktoriya Zyabkina, Olga Andreyeva, Yekaterina Yermak	3:36.09	
5	Sri Lanka	C. Sonali Merrill, Rathna Kumari, U.G. Sandamali, Chandrika Rasnayake	3:39.54	
	Bahrain		DNS	
