= 2017 Asian Athletics Championships – Women's 4 × 400 metres relay =

The women's 4 × 400 metres relay at the 2017 Asian Athletics Championships was held on 9 July. India won the race, but were later disqualified when Nirmala Sheoran was sanctioned for doping.

== Results ==
Rank	Team	Name	Time	Notes
1st place, gold medalist(s)	Vietnam	Nguyễn Thị Oanh, Quách Thị Lan, Hoàng Thị Ngọc, Nguyễn Thị Huyền	3:33.22	
2nd place, silver medalist(s)	Japan	Sayaka Aoki, Kana Ichikawa, Seika Aoyama, Manami Kira	3:37.74	
3rd place, bronze medalist(s)	Kazakhstan	Svetlana Golendova, Elina Mikhina, Adelina Akhmetova, Merjen Ishangulyeva	3:37.95	
4	Thailand	Pornpan Hoemhuk, Atchima Eng-Chuan, Jutamas Khonkham, Supanich Poolkerd	3:38.63	
DQ	India	Debashree Mazumdar, M. R. Poovamma, Jisna Mathew, Nirmala Sheoran	~~3:31.34~~	

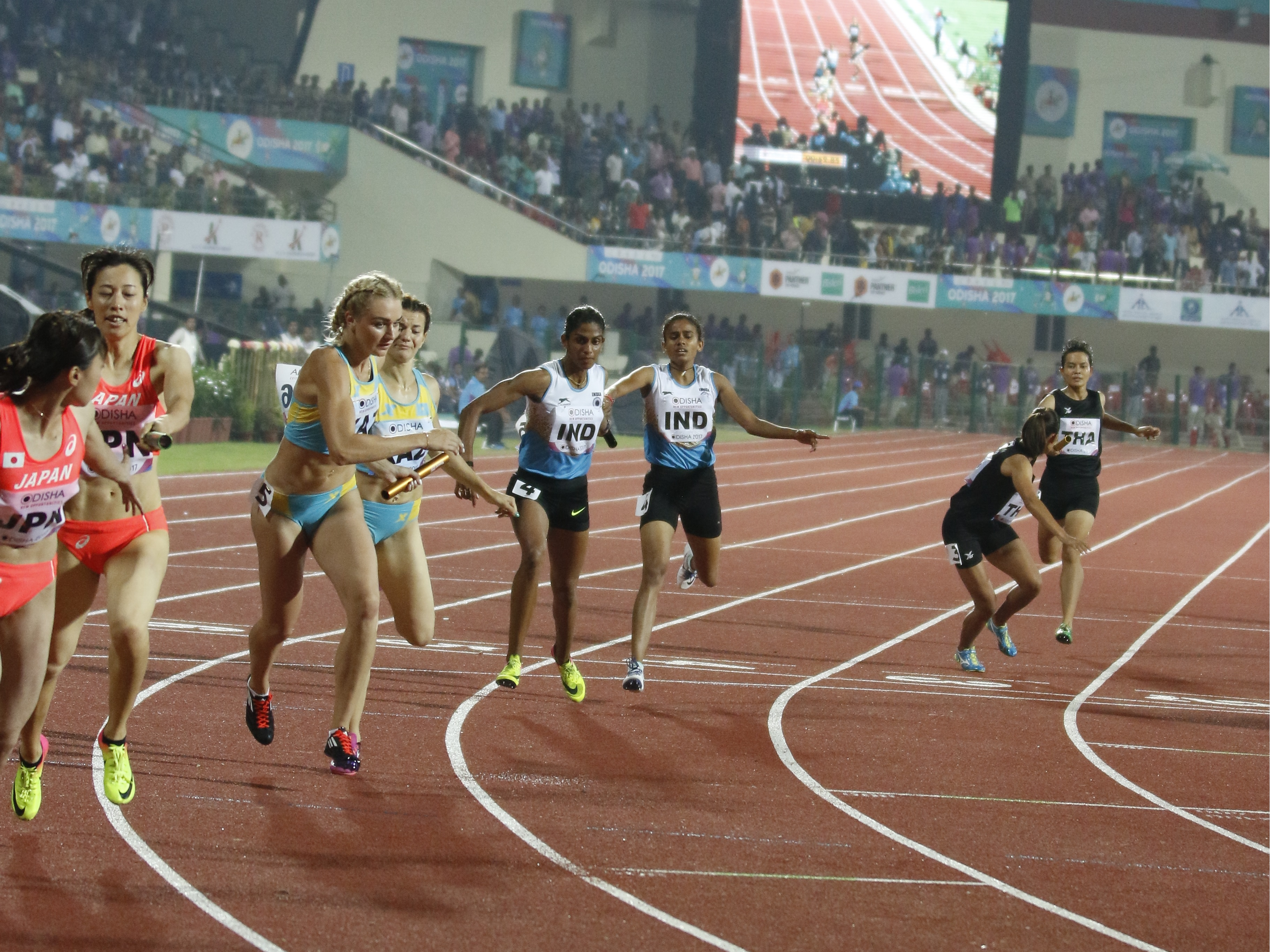
The first exchange

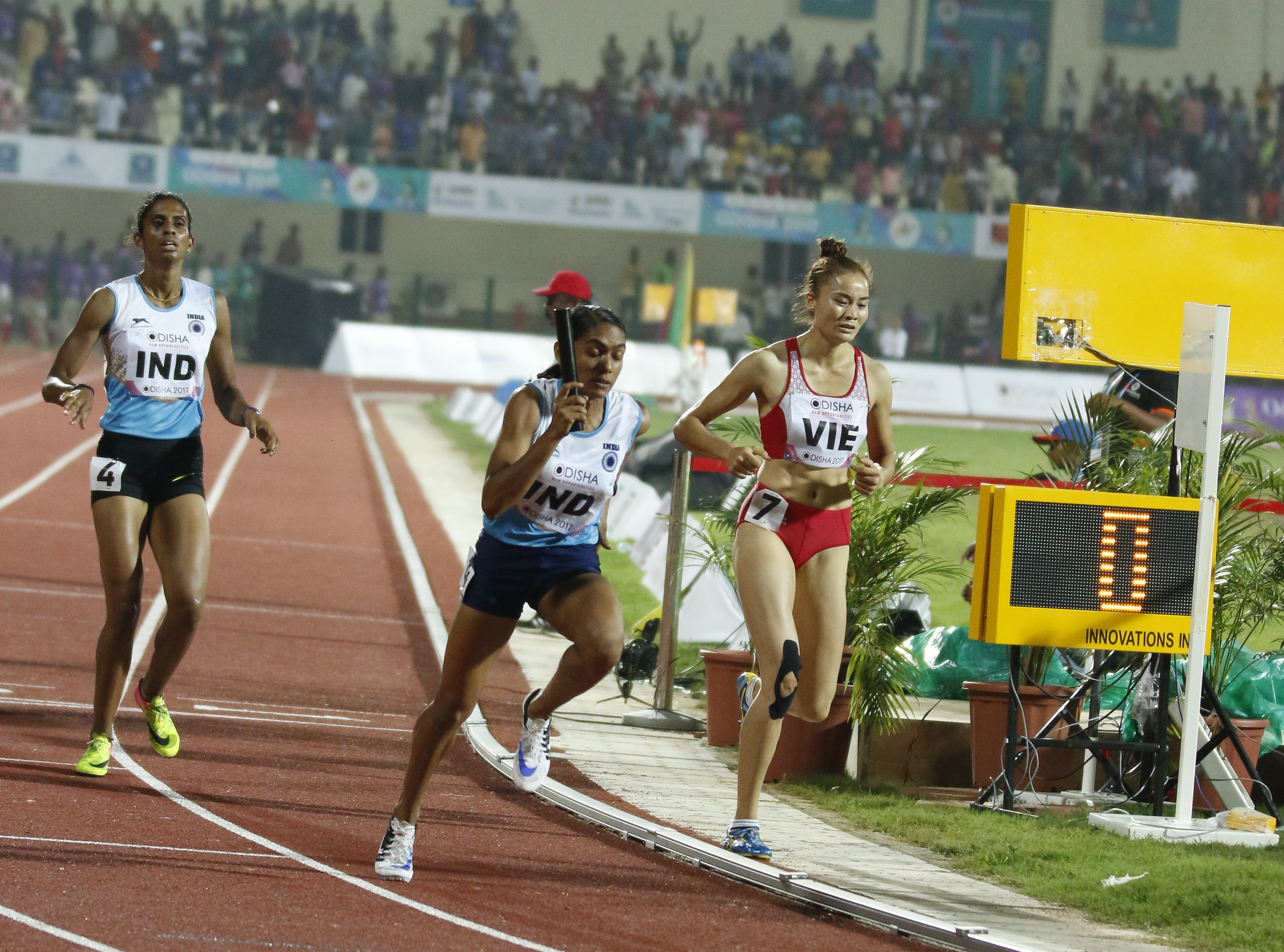
The second exchange
