= 2017 Asian Athletics Championships – Women's 400 metres hurdles =

The women's 400 metres hurdles at the 2017 Asian Athletics Championships was held on 7 and 8 July.

== Medalists ==
Gold	Nguyễn Thị Huyền; Vietnam
Silver	Raghavan Anu; India
Bronze	Sayaka Aoki; Japan

== Results ==
=== Heats ===
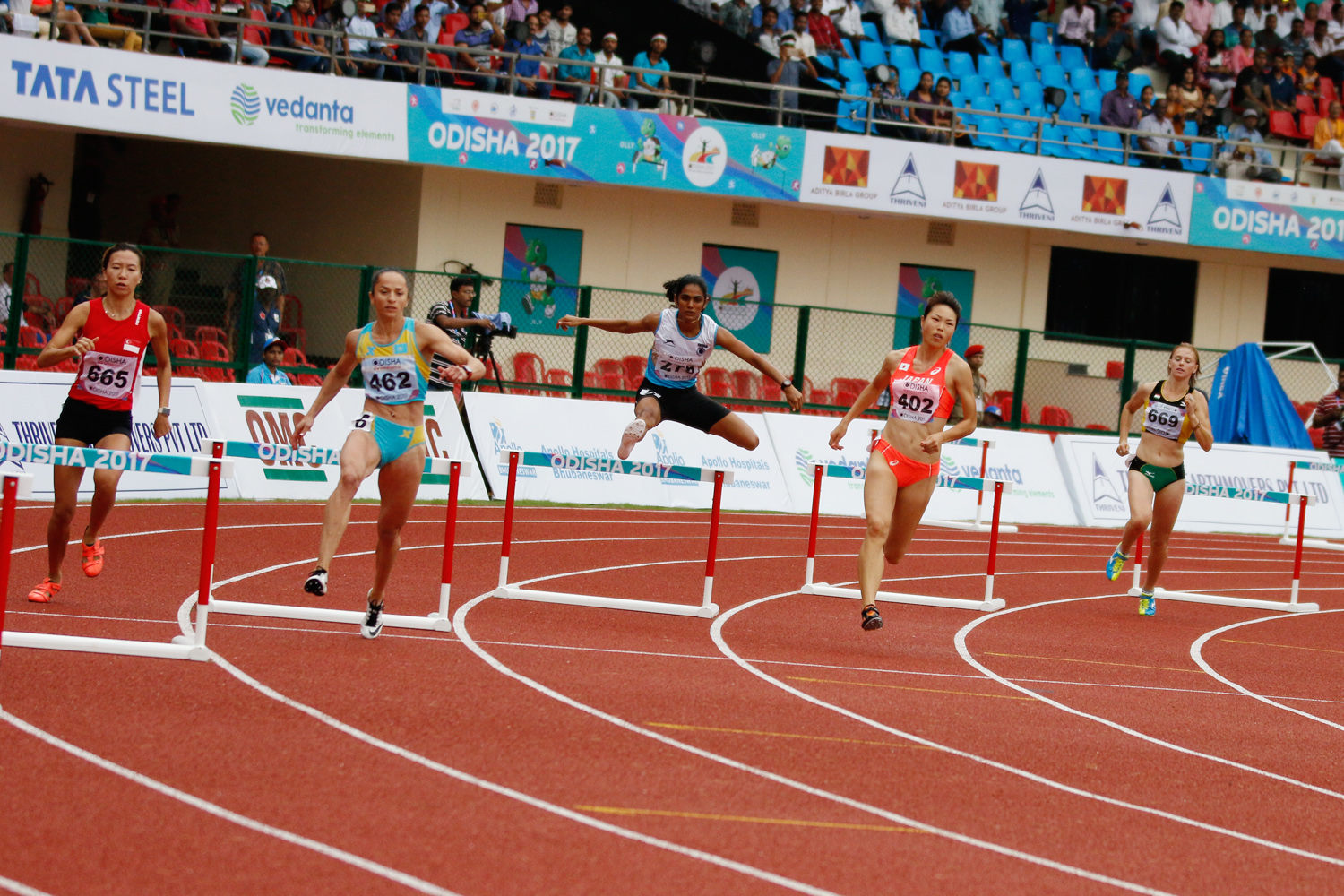
Heat 1

Qualification rule: First 2 in each heat (Q) and the next 2 fastest (q) qualified for the final.

Rank	Heat	Name	Nationality	Time	Notes
1	2	Nguyễn Thị Huyền	Vietnam	57.34	Q
2	2	Jauna Murmu	India	57.96	Q
3	1	Manami Kira	Japan	58.16	Q
4	2	Raghavan Anu	India	58.26	Q
5	1	Merjen Ishangulyeva	Kazakhstan	58.68	Q
6	2	Sayaka Aoki	Japan	59.39	q
7	1	M. Arpitha	India	1:00.05	Q
8	2	Adelina Akhmetova	Kazakhstan	1:01.34	q
9	1	Kristina Pronzhenko	Tajikistan	1:01.80	
10	1	Jutamas Khonkham	Thailand	1:02.72	
11	1	Chui Ling Goh	Singapore	1:02.90	
12	2	Nurul Faizah Asma	Malaysia	1:03.69	

=== Final ===
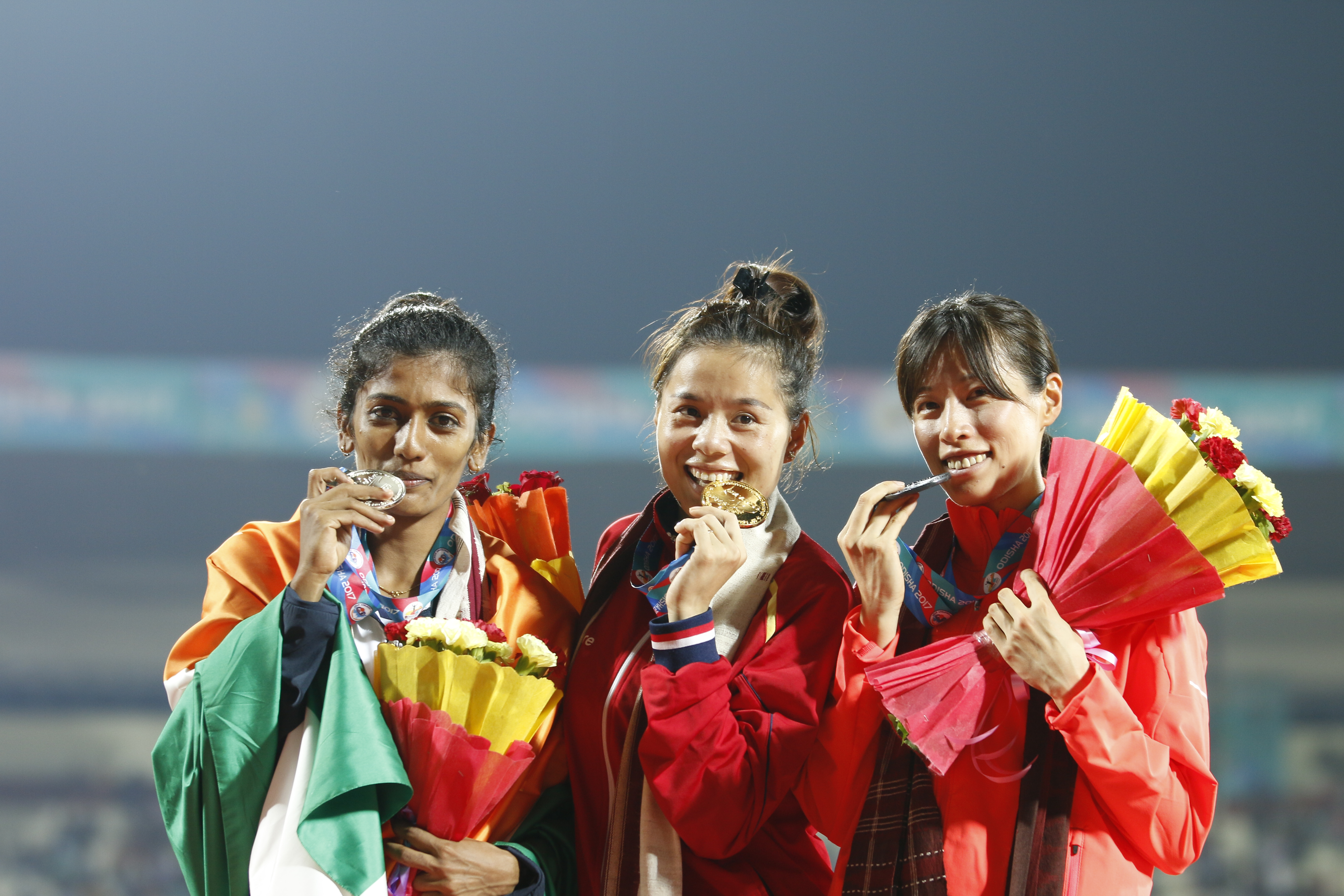
The medallists

Rank	Lane	Name	Nationality	Time	Notes
1st place, gold medalist(s)	3	Nguyễn Thị Huyền	Vietnam	56.14	
2nd place, silver medalist(s)	7	Raghavan Anu	India	57.22	
3rd place, bronze medalist(s)	2	Sayaka Aoki	Japan	58.18	
4	6	Merjen Ishangulyeva	Kazakhstan	58.51	
5	4	Manami Kira	Japan	58.52	
6	5	Jauna Murmu	India	59.11	
7	8	M. Arpitha	India	59.78	
8	1	Adelina Akhmetova	Kazakhstan	1:01.60	
