= List of Tajikistani records in athletics =

The following are the national records in athletics in Tajikistan maintained by the Athletic Federation of the Republic of Tajikistan (AFT).

== Outdoor ==
Key to tables: Awaiting ratification Record not kept by AFT Not ratified or later rescinded by AFT

=== Men ===
Event	Record	Athlete	Date	Meet	Place	Ref.
100 m	10.37 (+1.5 m/s)	Ildar Akhmadiev	4 June 2022	G. Arzumanov International Memorial	Tashkent, Uzbekistan	
100 m	10.37 (−1.1 m/s)	Favoris Muzrapov	25 May 2024	Regional Abduvaliev & Nazarov Meet	Dushanbe, Tajikistan	
200 m	20.77 (+0.1 m/s)	Ildar Akhmadiev	28 June 2024	Silk road to Olympic	Tashkent, Uzbekistan	
400 m	47.60	Davron Atabaev	24 June 2017	Gusman Kosanov Memorial	Almaty, Kazakhstan	
400 m	47.4 h	Aleksander Cherednishenko	8 September 1979		Tashkent, Soviet Union	
800 m	1:48.5 h	Rivkat Agletdinov	21 June 1983		Dushanbe, Soviet Union	
1500 m	3:44.51	Yevgeniy Stakanov	24 June 2004		Tula, Russia	
3000 m	7:57.03	Yevgeniy Stakanov	9 July 2004		Kazan, Russia	
5000 m	14:07.44	Sergey Davidov	20 June 1983		Moscow, Soviet Union	
10,000 m	29:29.0 h	Anatoliy Belogurov	8 May 1977		Dushanbe, Soviet Union	
Half marathon	1:08:50	Sokhibdjan Charipov	3 October 1999	IAAF World Half Marathon Championships	Palermo, Italy	
Marathon	2:18:40	Anatoliy Belogurov	20 June 1980		Moscow, Soviet Union	
Marathon	2:18:18	Sergey Davidov	5 August 1995		Omsk, Russia	
110 m hurdles	14.11 NWI	Aleksandr Zyabko	18 July 1985		Kiev, Soviet Union	
400 m hurdles	48.98	Nikolay Ilchenko	18 September 1986		Tashkent, Soviet Union	
3000 m steeplechase	8:46.4 h	Anatoliy Belogurov	15 April 1980		Moscow, Soviet Union	
High jump	2.31 m	Oleg Palashevskiy	12 August 1990		Bryansk, Soviet Union	
Pole vault	4.70 m	Yuriy Sakulin	16 July 1982		Leningrad, Soviet Union	
Long jump	8.18 m	Vasiliy Sokov	5 July 1988		Tallinn, Soviet Union	
Triple jump	17.52 m	Vasiliy Sokov	12 July 1991		Kiev, Soviet Union	
Shot put	18.50 m	Dzhumanazar Abbasov	8 May 1979		Tashkent, Soviet Union	
Discus throw	57.86 m	Khary Mamedov	7 May 1985		Dushanbe, Soviet Union	
Hammer throw	83.46 m	Andrey Abduvaliyev	26 May 1990		Sochi, Soviet Union	
Javelin throw	54.94 m	Buzurgmehr Kholikov	13 June 2016	National Championships	Dushanbe, Tajikistan	
Decathlon	7846 pts	Igor Sobolevskiy	15–16 July 1982		Leningrad, Soviet Union	
Decathlon	100m / Long jump / Shot put / High jump / 400m / 110m H / Discus / Pole vault / Javelin / 1500m; 11.10 / 7.53 m / 14.27 m / 1.96 m / 49.90 / 15.81 / 43.48 m / 4.20 m / 65.16 m / 4:28.25					
20 km walk (road)	1:22:16	Vladimir Gerus	27 April 1980		Cherkassy, Soviet Union	
50 km walk (road)	3:58:13	Aleksandr Kormilitsyn	3 August 1985		Leningrad, Soviet Union	
4 × 100 m relay	40.02	Tajik SSR; D. Miroshnichenko; S. Leonidov; I. Zayvoronok; Y. Mirov	18 June 1983		Moscow, Soviet Union	
4 × 400 m relay	3:09.8 h	Tajik SSR; K. Lyushakov; Gavrilin; S. Matveyev; Basyrov	1985		Dushanbe, Soviet Union	

=== Women ===
Event	Record	Athlete	Date	Meet	Place	Ref.
100 m	11.77 (+1.0 m/s)	Vladislava Ovcharenko	30 June 2012		Almaty, Kazakhstan	
100 m	11.77 NWI	Gulsumbi Sharifova	11 June 2019		Tashkent, Uzbekistan	
200 m	23.35 (+0.2 m/s)	Gulsumbi Sharifova	6 July 2019		Almaty, Kazakhstan	
400 m	52.70	Gulsumbi Sharifova	7 July 2019		Almaty, Kazakhstan	
800 m	2:01.8 h	Alla Libutina	30 May 1982		Tashkent, Soviet Union	
1500 m	4:06.42	Alla Libutina	26 July 1982		Kiev, Soviet Union	
3000 m	8:35.74	Alla Libutina	25 July 1982		Kiev, Soviet Union	
5000 m	17:47.55	Mehrangez Nazarova	25 June 2017		Almaty, Kazakhstan	
10,000 m	37:01.22	Badima Mirzoyeva	13 June 2016		Dushanbe, Tajikistan	
Half marathon	1:19:08	Gulsara Dadabayeva	5 May 2002	World Half Marathon Championships	Brussels, Belgium	
Marathon	2:39:01	Gulsara Dadabayeva	26 October 2003	Ljubljana Marathon	Ljubljana, Slovenia	
100 m hurdles	13.92 NWI	Nadezhda Korshunova	20 May 1979		Sochi, Soviet Union	
100 m hurdles	13.26 NWI	Natalya Dorofoyeva	10 June 1983		Moscow, Soviet Union	
400 m hurdles	58.47	Kristina Pronzhenko	12 June 2019		Tashkent, Uzbekistan	
3000 m steeplechase	11:26.68	Mekhrangez Nazarova	5 June 2016	Asian Junior Championships	Ho Chi Minh City, Vietnam	
High jump	1.91 m	Yelena Gorobets	11 July 1981		Leningrad, Soviet Union	
Pole vault						
Long jump	6.19 m	Zhanna Matsola	22 April 1989		Frunze, Soviet Union	
Triple jump	12.58 m	Marina Rudneva	12 May 1991		Alma Ata, Soviet Union	
Shot put	18.52 m	Svetlana Tatichek	31 May 1987		Dushanbe, Soviet Union	
Discus throw	65.38 m	Valentina Stepushina	23 June 1976		Kiev, Soviet Union	
Hammer throw	63.43 m	Galina Mityaeva	20 June 2009		Dushanbe, Tajikistan	
Javelin throw	37.25 m	Mavluda Aslamova	19/20 May 2015		Dushanbe, Tajikistan	
Heptathlon	5350 pts h	Yelena Grishina	16–17 September 1982		Frunze, Soviet Union	
Heptathlon	100m H / High jump / Shot put / 200m / Long jump / Javelin / 800m; 14.5 h / 1.77 m / 12.68 m / 26.0 h / 5.55 m / 35.40 m / 2:25.0 h					
20 km walk (road)	1:47:06	Larisa Voronkova	4 September 1988		Mogilev, Soviet Union	
50 km walk (road)						
4 × 100 m relay	45.88	Tajik SSR; N. Dorofeyeva; O. Baydyuk; Svetlana Morar; N. Batcheyeva	18 June 1983		Moscow, Soviet Union	
4 × 400 m relay	3:46.2 h	Tajik SSR	21 June 1983		Moscow, Soviet Union	

=== Mixed ===
Event	Record	Athlete	Date	Meet	Place	Ref.
4 × 400 m relay	3:49.66	Tajikistan; M. Mirzozoda; D. Abdulloyeva; K. Pronzhenko; A. Pronzhenko	2 July 2023	Qosanov Memorial	Almaty, Kazakhstan	
4 × 400 m relay	3:35.77	Tajikistan; B. Boboyev; D. Abdulloyeva; M. Mirzozada; K. Pronzhenko	12 May 2024	Central Asian Championships	Tashkent, Uzbekistan	

== Indoor ==
=== Men ===
Event	Record	Athlete	Date	Meet	Place	Ref.
60 m	7.07	Igor Khan	26 February 2009		Tashkent, Uzbekistan	
60 m	6.83	Favoris Muzrapov	19 March 2022	World Championships	Belgrade, Serbia	
60 m	6.77	Favoris Muzrapov	18 February 2024	Asian Championships	Tehran, Iran	
60 m	6.73	Favoris Muzrapov	18 February 2024	Asian Championships	Tehran, Iran	
200 m	23.03	Gregoriy Derepaskin	4 March 2016		Tashkent, Uzbekistan	
400 m	48.57	Davron Atabayev	18 September 2017	Asian Indoor and Martial Arts Games	Ashgabat, Turkmenistan	
800 m	1:51.80	Odilshokh Ismatov	20 January 2018	IV International Meeting of Olga Rypakova's prizes	Oskemen, Kazakhstan	
1500 m	3:50.30	Yevgeniy Stakanov	19 February 2004		Moscow, Russia	
3000 m	8:18.20	Yevgeniy Stakanov	18 February 2004		Moscow, Russia	
60 m hurdles						
High jump	2.28 m	Oleg Palashevskiy	11 February 1984		Moscow, Soviet Union	
Pole vault						
Long jump	8.02 m	Vasiliy Sokov	4 February 1989		Gomel, Soviet Union	
Triple jump	17.30 m	Vasiliy Sokov	4 February 1990		Chelyabinsk, Soviet Union	
Triple jump	17.30 m	Vasiliy Sokov	2 February 1992		Moscow, Russia	
Shot put						
Heptathlon						
Heptathlon	60m / Long jump / Shot put / High jump / 60m H / Pole vault / 1000m					
5000 m walk						
4 × 400 m relay	3:34.86	Tajikistan; Alisher Pulatov; Muzrapov; Derepaskin; Gaforov	28 February/1 March 2015		Tashkent, Uzbekistan	
4 × 400 m relay	3:34.45	Tajikistan; Leonid Pronzhenko; Mirsaid Mirzozoda; Mukhammadrizo Mirzozoda; Aleksandr Pronzhenko	12 February 2023	Asian Championships	Astana, Kazakhstan	

=== Women ===
Event	Record	Athlete	Date	Meet	Place	Ref.
60 m	8.13	Shakhida Ziyayeva	3 March 2007		Tashkent, Uzbekistan	
200 m						
400 m	56.88	Kristina Pronzhenko	18 September 2017	Asian Indoor and Martial Arts Games	Ashgabat, Turkmenistan	
800 m	2:22.2 h (Note: record set during pentathlon competition)	Kristina Pronzhenko	21 February 2016	Asian Championships	Doha, Qatar	
1500 m	4:36.8 h	Gulsara Dadabayeva	12 October 2001		Rasht, Iran	
3000 m	9:00.96	Alla Libutina	18 February 1983		Moscow, Soviet Union	
60 m hurdles	7.92	Nadezhda Korshunova	17 February 1985		Chişinău, Soviet Union	
High jump	1.54 m (Note: record set during pentathlon competition)	Kristina Pronzhenko	21 February 2016	Asian Championships	Doha, Qatar	
Pole vault						
Long jump	5.52 m	Dilafruz Dadabayeva	3 March 2007		Tashkent, Uzbekistan	
Triple jump						
Shot put	16.00 m	Galina Mityayeva	1 February 2014		Montreal, Canada	
Weight throw	18.25 m	Galina Mityayeva	19 February 2011		Montreal, Canada	
Pentathlon	3435 pts	Kristina Pronzhenko	21 February 2016	Asian Championships	Doha, Qatar	
Pentathlon	60m H / High jump / Shot put / Long jump / 800m; 9.42 / 1.54 m / 8.93 m / 5.47 m / 2:22.2 h					
3000 m walk	19:31.60	Madina Irgasheva	25 September 2005	Women's Islamic Games	Tehran, Iran	
4 × 400 m relay	4:08.82	Tajikistan	27 September 2005	Women's Islamic Games	Tehran, Iran	
