= 2019 Asian Athletics Championships – Women's 400 metres =

Women's 400 metres at the 2019 Asian Athletics Championships
- Venue: Khalifa International Stadium
- Location: Doha, Qatar
- Dates: 21 April
- Competitors: 15 from 11 nations
- Winning time: 51.34

Medalists
gold medal	Salwa Eid Naser	Bahrain
silver medal	Elina Mikhina	Kazakhstan
bronze medal	M. R. Poovamma	India

The women's 400 metres at the 2019 Asian Athletics Championships was held on 21 April.

== Records ==
Records before the 2019 Asian Athletics Championships
Record	Athlete (nation)	Time (s)	Location	Date
World record	Marita Koch (GDR)	47.60	Canberra, Australia	6 October 1985
Asian record	Salwa Eid Naser (BHR)	49.08	Fontvieille, Monaco	20 July 2018
Championship record	Damayanthi Dharsha (SRI)	51.05	Jakarta, Indonesia	30 August 2000
World leading	Sharrika Barnett (USA)	50.96	Gainesville, United States	29 March 2019
Asian leading	No times recorded			

== Results ==
=== Heats ===
Qualification rule: First 3 in each heat (Q) and the next 2 fastest (q) qualified for the final.

Rank	Heat	Name	Nationality	Time	Notes
1	2	Salwa Naser	Bahrain	52.29	Q, SB
2	2	M. R. Poovamma	India	52.46	Q, SB
3	1	Nadeesha Ramanayaka	Sri Lanka	53.66	Q
4	2	Mae Hirosawa	Japan	53.91	Q
5	2	Kristina Pronzhenko	Tajikistan	54.13	q, NR
6	1	Svetlana Golendova	Kazakhstan	54.26	Q
6	2	Elina Mikhina	Kazakhstan	54.26	q, SB
8	1	Zainab Mohammed	Bahrain	54.37	Q, PB
9	1	Huang Guifen	China	54.44	
10	1	Nguyễn Thị Hằng	Vietnam	54.64	SB
11	2	Li Xue	China	55.04	
12	1	Tatiana Rybakova	Kyrgyzstan	1:00.48	PB
13	2	Kenza Sosse	Qatar	1:01.88	NR
14	1	Hanin Thabit	Yemen	1:06.37	SB
	1	Hima Das	India	DNF	

=== Final ===
Rank	Lane	Name	Nationality	Time	Notes
1st place, gold medalist(s)	4	Salwa Naser	Bahrain	51.34	SB
2nd place, silver medalist(s)	3	Elina Mikhina	Kazakhstan	53.19	SB
3rd place, bronze medalist(s)	5	M. R. Poovamma	India	53.21	
4	8	Mae Hirosawa	Japan	53.54	
5	6	Svetlana Golendova	Kazakhstan	53.83	
6	7	Nadeesha Ramanayaka	Sri Lanka	53.98	
7	2	Kristina Pronzhenko	Tajikistan	54.56	
8	9	Zainab Mohammed	Bahrain	54.61	
