= Debashree =

- Language: Bengali

Origin
- Region of origin: India

Debashree may refer to:

- Debashree Roy, an Indian actress and dancer
- Debashree Mazumdar, an Indian sprint athlete
- Deboshree Chowdhury, a Bengali politician
