= Dil Maya Karki =

Nepalese sprinter

Personal information
- Born: 5 October 1988 (age 37) Nepal

Sport
- Sport: Track and field
- Event(s): 200 metres, 400 metres
- Updated on 29 August 2015

Dil Maya Karki (born 5 October 1988) is a sprinter from Nepal. She represented her country in the 400 metres at the 2015 World Championships in Beijing without advancing from the first round. She represented her country at the 2014 Asian Games.

== International competitions ==
Year	Competition	Venue	Position	Event	Notes
Representing Nepal
2013	Asian Championships	Pune, India	19th (h)	200 m	27.57
2013	Asian Championships	Pune, India	12th (h)	400 m	61.63
2014	Asian Games	Incheon, South Korea	20th (h)	200 m	27.03
2014	Asian Games	Incheon, South Korea	21st (h)	400 m	60.30
2015	World Championships	Beijing, China	12th (h)	400 m	60.99
2016	South Asian Games	Guwahati, India	5th	400 m	59.9
2016	South Asian Games	Guwahati, India	5th	4 × 400 m relay	4:08.20

== Personal bests ==
- 200 metres – 27.03 (+1.2 m/s, Incheon 2014)
- 400 metres – 60.30 (Incheon 2014)
- 400 metres – 59.9h (Guwahati 2016)
