= Athletics at the 2014 Asian Games – Women's 4 × 400 metres relay =

Women's 4 × 400 metres relay at the 2014 Asian Games
- Venue: Incheon Asiad Main Stadium
- Dates: 2 October 2014
- Competitors: 32 from 8 nations

Medalists
gold medal	India; Priyanka Pawar, Tintu Luka, Mandeep Kaur, M. R. Poovamma
silver medal	Japan; Seika Aoyama, Nanako Matsumoto, Kana Ichikawa, Asami Chiba
bronze medal	China; Li Manyuan, Wang Huan, Chen Jingwen, Cheng Chong

The women's 4 × 400 metres relay event at the 2014 Asian Games was held at the Incheon Asiad Main Stadium, Incheon, South Korea on 2 October.

== Schedule ==
All times are Korea Standard Time (UTC+09:00)

Date	Time	Event
Thursday, 2 October 2014	20:35	Final

== Records ==
Prior to this competition, the existing world, Asian and Games records were as follows.

World Record	Soviet Union	3:15.17	Seoul, South Korea	1 October 1988
Asian Record	China	3:24.28	Beijing, China	13 September 1993
Games Record	India	3:29.02	Guangzhou, China	26 November 2010

== Results ==
Rank	Team	Time	Notes
1st place, gold medalist(s)	India (IND); Priyanka Pawar; Tintu Luka; Mandeep Kaur; M. R. Poovamma	3:28.68	GR
2nd place, silver medalist(s)	Japan (JPN); Seika Aoyama; Nanako Matsumoto; Kana Ichikawa; Asami Chiba	3:30.80	
3rd place, bronze medalist(s)	China (CHN); Li Manyuan; Wang Huan; Chen Jingwen; Cheng Chong	3:32.02	
4	Thailand (THA); Pornpan Hoemhuk; Atchima Eng-chuan; Karat Srimuang; Treewadee Yongphan	3:33.16	
5	Vietnam (VIE); Nguyễn Thị Huyền; Nguyễn Thị Thúy; Nguyễn Thị Oanh; Quách Thị Lan	3:33.20	
6	Kazakhstan (KAZ); Marina Maslyonko; Yuliya Rakhmanova; Elina Mikhina; Margarita Mukasheva	3:36.83	
7	South Korea (KOR); Min Ji-hyun; Oh Se-ra; Park Mi-jin; Jo Eun-ju	3:39.90	
8	Singapore (SIN); Tyra Summer Ree; Shanti Pereira; Goh Chui Ling; Dipna Lim Prasad	3:49.97	
