= Anilda Thomas =

Indian sprinter

Personal information
- Born: 6 May 1993 (age 32) Kothamangalam, Kerala, India

Sport
- Country: India
- Sport: Track and field
- Event: 400 metres

Anilda Thomas (born 6 May 1993) is an Indian sprinter who specialises in the 400 metres event. She participated in the 2016 Summer Olympics in the women's 4 × 400 metres relay event.

Running with Nirmala Sheoran, M. R. Poovamma and Tintu Lukka, the quartet clocked 3:27.88 at Bangalore in July 2016, finishing with the 12th best time in the world as top 16 relay teams qualified for the Olympics.
