= Elina Mikhina =

Kazakhstani sprinter (born 1994)

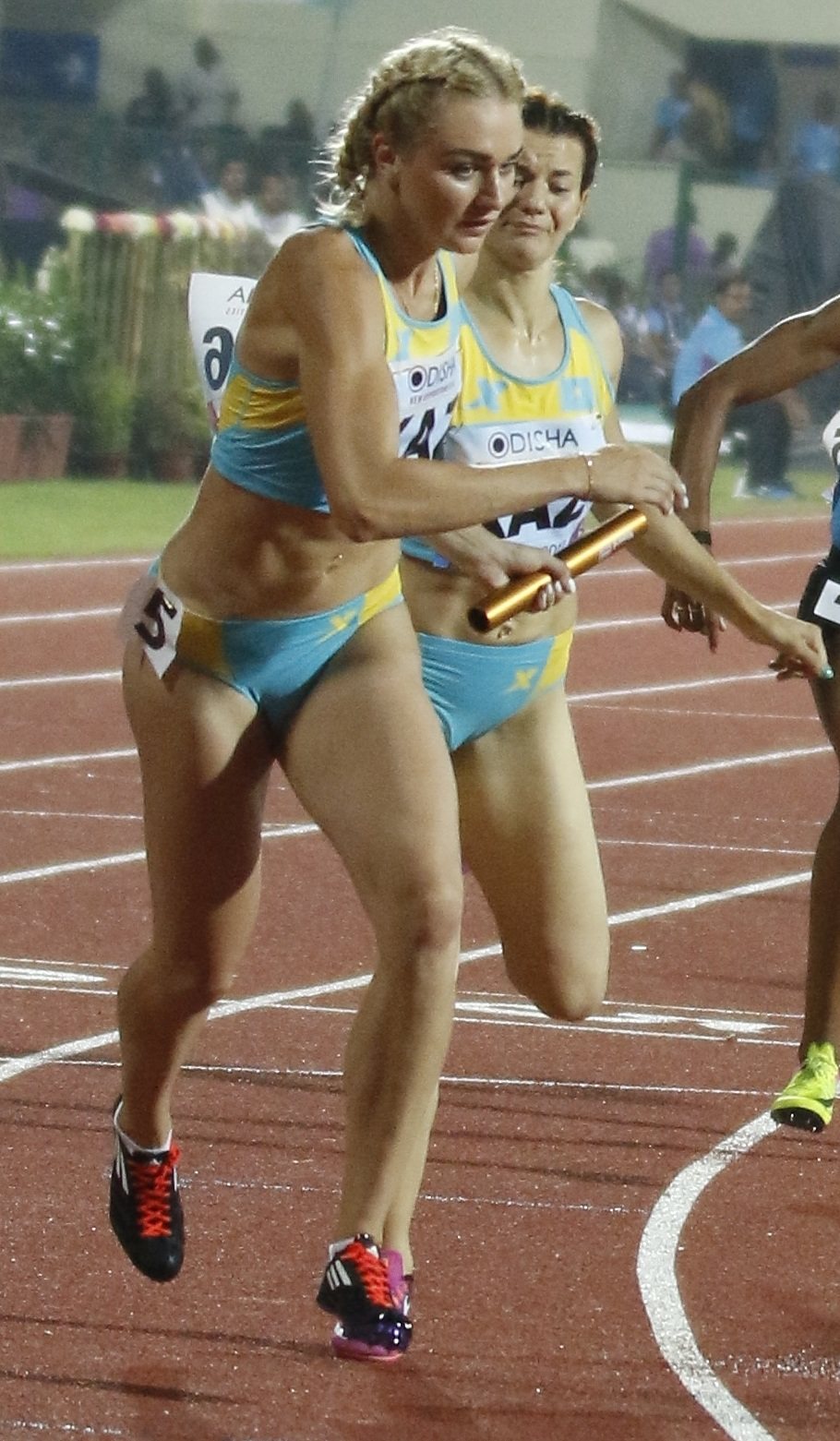
- Elina Mikhina (left) in 2017

Personal information
- Born: 16 July 1994 (age 31) Ridder, Kazakhstan
- Height: 1.74 m (5 ft 9 in)
- Weight: 65 kg (143 lb)

Sport
- Sport: Athletics
- Event: 400 metres
Medal record
Women's athletics
Representing Kazakhstan
Asian Indoor Championships
Gold medal – first place	2014 Hangzhou	4×400 m
Gold medal – first place	2018 Tehran	4×400 m
Gold medal – first place	2023 Astana	400 m
Gold medal – first place	2023 Astana	4×400 m
Silver medal – second place	2016 Doha	400 m
Silver medal – second place	2018 Tehran	400 m

Elina Mikhina (born 16 July 1994, in Ridder) is a Kazakhstani athlete sprinter specialising in the 400 metres. She won the silver medal at the 2016 Asian Indoor Championships. Since January 2018 she has been an athlete at the Kazakhstan professional track and field club Altay Athletics.

Her personal bests in the event are 52.09 seconds outdoors (Almaty 2016) and 52.53 seconds indoors (Ust-Kamenogorsk 2018).

== Competition record ==
Year	Competition	Venue	Position	Event	Notes
Representing Kazakhstan
2009	Asian Youth Games	Singapore	2nd	400 m	57.73
2009	Asian Youth Games	Singapore	4th	4 × 400 m relay	1:46.60
2010	Youth Olympic Games	Singapore	2nd (C)	400 m	58.11
2011	World Youth Championships	Lille, France	44th (h)	400 m	60.44
2012	World Junior Championships	Barcelona, Spain	11th (h)	4 × 400 m relay	3:45.34
2014	Asian Indoor Championships	Hangzhou, China	1st	4 × 400 m relay	3:42.45
2014	Asian Games	Incheon, South Korea	9th (h)	400 m	53.94
2014	Asian Games	Incheon, South Korea	6th	4 × 400 m relay	3:36.83
2015	Asian Championships	Wuhan, China	3rd	4 × 400 m relay	3:35.14
2016	Asian Indoor Championships	Doha, Qatar	2nd	400 m	53.85
2016	Olympic Games	Rio de Janeiro, Brazil	50th (h)	400 m	53.83
2017	Asian Championships	Bhubaneswar, India	11th (h)	400 m	57.33
2017	Asian Championships	Bhubaneswar, India	4th	4 × 400 m relay	3:37.95
2017	Universiade	Taipei, Taiwan	9th (sf)	400 m	53.04
2017	Asian Indoor and Martial Arts Games	Ashgabat, Turkmenistan	1st	400 m	53.37
2017	Asian Indoor and Martial Arts Games	Ashgabat, Turkmenistan	–	4 × 400 m relay	DQ
2018	Asian Indoor Championships	Tehran, Iran	2nd	400 m	53.49
2018	Asian Indoor Championships	Tehran, Iran	1st	4 × 400 m relay	3:41.67
2018	World Indoor Championships	Birmingham, United Kingdom	26th (h)	400 m	53.90
2018	World Indoor Championships	Birmingham, United Kingdom	9th (h)	4 × 400 m relay	3:40.54
2018	Asian Games	Jakarta, Indonesia	3rd	400 m	52.63
2018	Asian Games	Jakarta, Indonesia	6th	4 × 400 m relay	3:36.73
2019	Asian Championships	Doha, Qatar	2nd	400 m	53.19
2019	Asian Championships	Doha, Qatar	2nd	4 × 100 m relay	43.36
2019	World Relays	Yokohama, Japan	8th (h)	4 × 100 m relay	43.71
2019	Universiade	Naples, Italy	9th (sf)	400 m	52.41
2019	World Championships	Doha, Qatar	12th (h)	4 × 100 m relay	43.79
2023	Asian Indoor Championships	Astana, Kazakhstan	1st	400 m	54.07
2023	Asian Indoor Championships	Astana, Kazakhstan	1st	4 × 400 m relay	3:44.21
2023	Asian Championships	Bangkok, Thailand	–	400 m	DQ
