= Gretta Taslakian =

Lebanese sprinter (born 1985)

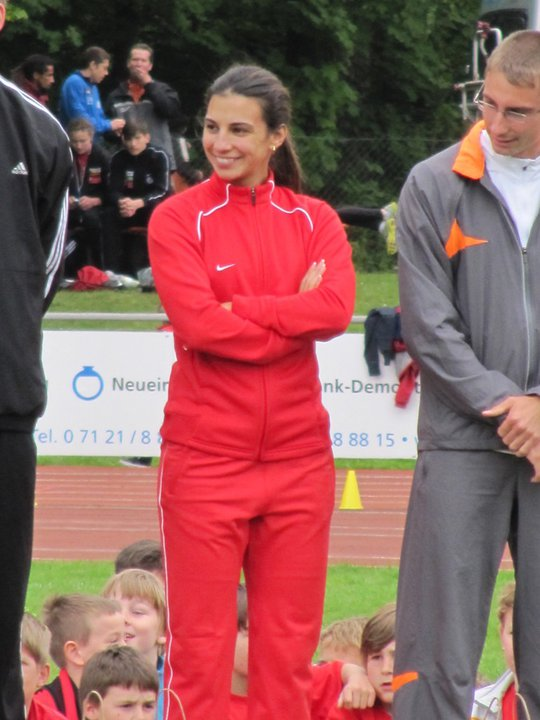

Personal information
- Born: 16 August 1985 (age 40) Ghadir, Lebanon
- Height: 1.71 m (5 ft 7 1/2 in)

Sport
- Country: Lebanon
- Sport: Women's Athletics
- Event: 200 metres
- Club: Inter-Lebanon (Lebanon)
Medal record
Asian Athletics Championships
Silver medal – second place	2011 Kobe	200 m
Bronze medal – third place	2013 Pune	400 m
Pan Arab Games
Gold medal – first place	2007 Cairo	100 m
Gold medal – first place	2007 Cairo	200 m
Gold medal – first place	2011 Doha	200 m
Silver medal – second place	2011 Doha	100 m

Gretta Taslakian (born 16 August 1985) is a Lebanese sprinter of Armenian and Syrian descent who specializes in the 200 metres and 400 meters . She is the first Lebanese woman to participate in three Olympic Games. Gretta is the current Lebanese national record holder in the outdoor 200 meters and 400 meters and indoor 400 meters. She was also a member of the record holding team in the outdoor 4x100 meter relay and 4x400 meter relay.

== Biography ==
She was born in Ghadir, Lebanon, to Syrian-Armenian father and Lebanese mother.

Gretta came in second place at the 11th Asian Junior Athletic Championships in the 200 metres. She competed at the 2001 World Championships, the 2003 World Indoor Championships and the 2004 World Indoor Championships, where she set the indoor 200 meter Lebanese national record at 25.80. She set a new national record in the women's 200 metres at the 2004 Summer Olympics, but came in last in her preliminary heat and did not advance.

She competed at the 2006 Asian Games in the 200 meters but was eliminated in the first heat. Taslakian won two gold medals for Lebanon in the 2007 Pan Arab Games in Cairo, Egypt and achieved her personal best in the 200 metres is 23.56 seconds in the final of the 200 meters in November. She also competed at the 2007 World Championships without success.

She competed in the 2008 Summer Olympics representing Lebanon. At the first round of the 200 metres, Gretta came in last in her heat as she ran in a time of 25.32 seconds, which was her season best, but not enough to qualify to the next round.

She came in eighth place at the 2010 Asian Indoor Athletics Championships in the 60 meters. She also came in fourth place at the 2010 Asian Games in 200 meters and set a new national record in the 100 meters at 11.84.{ She also competed at the 2011 Pan Arab Games, winning a silver medal in the 100 metres and a gold medal in the 200 metres. Taslakian won a silver medal in the 200 metres at the 2011 Asian Athletics Championships.

At the 2012 Summer Olympics, she again came in last in her heat and did not qualify from her heat.
