= 2017 Asian Athletics Championships – Women's 400 metres =

The women's 400 metres at the 2017 Asian Athletics Championships was held on 6 and 7 July.

== Medalists ==
Gold	Quách Thị Lan; Vietnam
Silver	Jisna Mathew; India
Bronze	M. R. Poovamma; India

== Results ==
=== Heats ===
Qualification rule: First 3 in each heat (Q) and the next 2 fastest (q) qualified for the final.

Rank	Heat	Name	Nationality	Time	Notes
1	1	Nirmala Sheoran	India	52.79	Q
2	2	M. R. Poovamma	India	53.16	Q
3	2	Jisna Mathew	India	53.18	Q
4	1	Quách Thị Lan	Vietnam	53.26	Q
5	1	Nirmali Madushika	Sri Lanka	54.38	Q
6	1	Seika Aoyama	Japan	55.09	q
7	2	Kristina Pronzhenko	Tajikistan	55.43	Q
8	2	Aliya Khattab Boshnak	Jordan	56.49	q
9	2	Supanich Poolkerd	Thailand	56.79	
10	1	Pornpan Hoemhuk	Thailand	57.22	
11	1	Elina Mikhina	Kazakhstan	57.33	
12	2	Mirufath Ahmed	Maldives	1:01.80	
13	1	Diala El Khazen	Lebanon	1:02.01	
	2	Liang Nuo	China	DNS	

=== Final ===
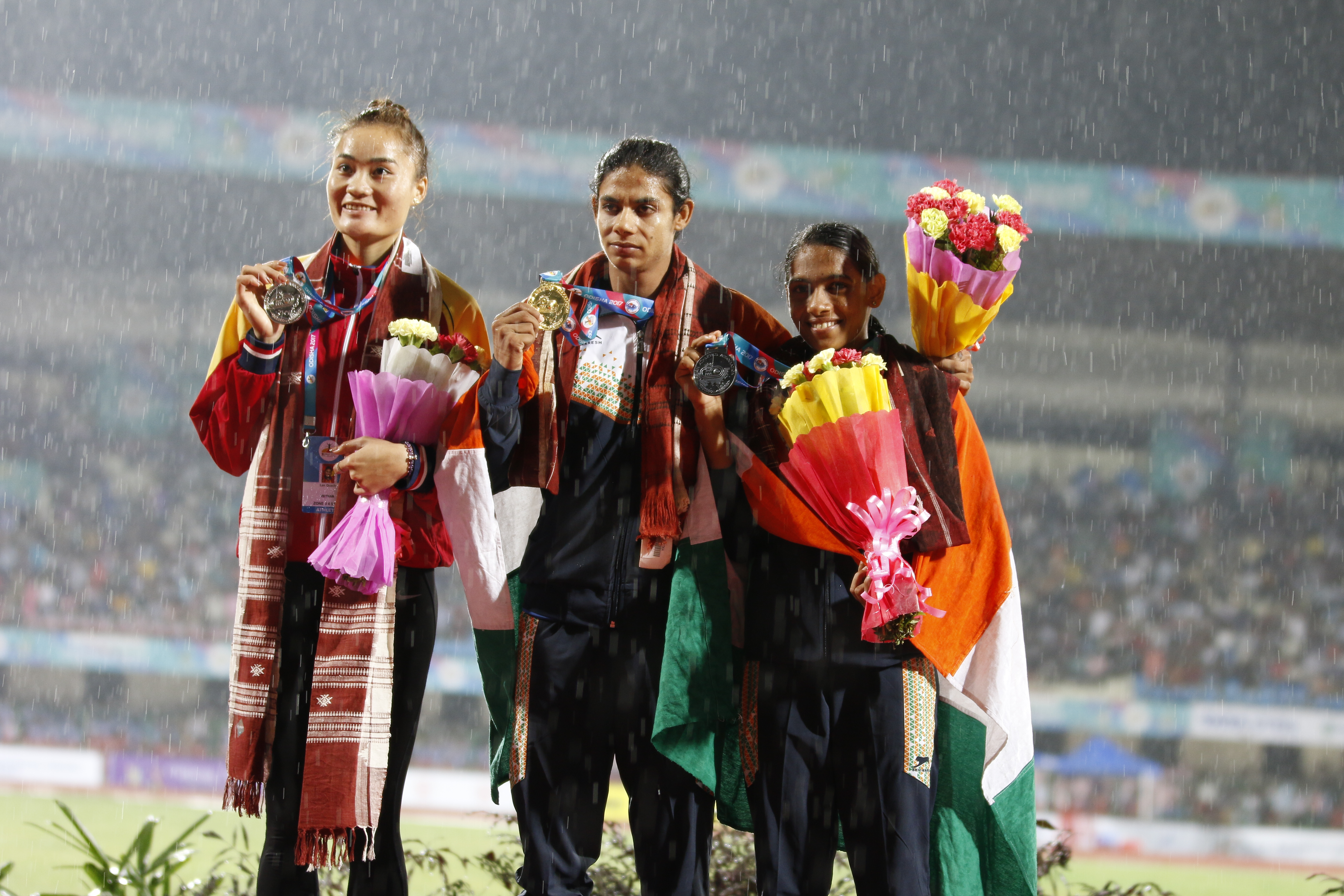
The original medallists at the ceremony, Quach Thi Lan, Nirmala Sheoran and Jisna Mathew. Sheoran was stripped of her gold medal for doping.

Rank	Lane	Name	Nationality	Time	Notes
1st place, gold medalist(s)	6	Quách Thị Lan	Vietnam	52.78	
2nd place, silver medalist(s)	5	Jisna Mathew	India	53.32	
3rd place, bronze medalist(s)	4	M. R. Poovamma	India	53.36	
4	7	Nirmali Madushika	Sri Lanka	54.58	
5	8	Kristina Pronzhenko	Tajikistan	54.62	
6	2	Seika Aoyama	Japan	55.63	
7	1	Aliya Khattab Boshnak	Jordan	57.33	
DQ	3	Nirmala Sheoran	India	~~52.01~~	
