= Athletics at the 2014 Asian Games – Women's 400 metres =

Women's 400 metres at the 2014 Asian Games
- Venue: Incheon Asiad Main Stadium
- Dates: 27–28 September 2014
- Competitors: 21 from 14 nations

Medalists
gold medal	Kemi Adekoya	Bahrain
silver medal	Quách Thị Lan	Vietnam
bronze medal	M. R. Poovamma	India

The women's 400 metres event at the 2014 Asian Games was held at the Incheon Asiad Main Stadium, Incheon, South Korea on 27–28 September.

== Schedule ==
All times are Korea Standard Time (UTC+09:00)

Date	Time	Event
Saturday, 27 September 2014	20:20	Round 1
Sunday, 28 September 2014	19:20	Final

== Records ==
Prior to this competition, the existing world, Asian and Games records were as follows.

World Record	Marita Koch (GDR)	47.60	Canberra, Australia	6 October 1985
Asian Record	Ma Yuqin (CHN)	49.81	Beijing, China	11 September 1993
Games Record	Damayanthi Dharsha (SRI)	51.13	Busan, South Korea	10 October 2002

== Results ==
=== Round 1 ===
- Qualification: First 2 in each heat (Q) and the next 2 fastest (q) advance to the final.

==== Heat 1 ====
Rank	Athlete	Time	Notes
1	Chandrika Subashini (SRI)	52.78	Q
2	Yuliya Rakhmanova (KAZ)	54.21	Q
3	Siti Nur Afiqah (MAS)	54.47	
4	Chen Jingwen (CHN)	54.93	
5	Oh Se-ra (KOR)	55.92	
6	Leong Ka Man (MAC)	57.07	
7	Goh Chui Ling (SIN)	58.56	

==== Heat 2 ====
Rank	Athlete	Time	Notes
1	M. R. Poovamma (IND)	52.17	Q
2	Quách Thị Lan (VIE)	52.57	Q
3	Seika Aoyama (JPN)	52.99	q
4	Elina Mikhina (KAZ)	53.94	
5	Dana Hussein (IRQ)	54.78	
6	Atchima Eng-chuan (THA)	55.18	
7	T. Piriyah (SIN)	58.73	

==== Heat 3 ====
Rank	Athlete	Time	Notes
1	Kemi Adekoya (BRN)	51.11	Q, GR
2	Mandeep Kaur (IND)	53.06	Q
3	Nguyễn Thị Huyền (VIE)	53.19	q
4	Nanako Matsumoto (JPN)	53.65	
5	Cheng Chong (CHN)	54.38	
6	Min Ji-hyun (KOR)	55.91	
7	Dil Maya Karki (NEP)	1:00.30	

=== Final ===
Rank	Athlete	Time	Notes
1st place, gold medalist(s)	Kemi Adekoya (BRN)	51.59	
2nd place, silver medalist(s)	Quách Thị Lan (VIE)	52.06	
3rd place, bronze medalist(s)	M. R. Poovamma (IND)	52.36	
4	Chandrika Subashini (SRI)	52.47	
5	Seika Aoyama (JPN)	53.20	
6	Mandeep Kaur (IND)	53.38	
7	Nguyễn Thị Huyền (VIE)	53.79	
8	Yuliya Rakhmanova (KAZ)	54.41	
