= Athletics at the 2014 Asian Games – Women's 200 metres =

Women's 200 metres at the 2014 Asian Games
- Venue: Incheon Asiad Main Stadium
- Dates: 30 September – 1 October 2014
- Competitors: 22 from 17 nations

Medalists
gold medal	Olga Safronova	Kazakhstan
silver medal	Wei Yongli	China
bronze medal	Chisato Fukushima	Japan

The women's 200 metres event at the 2014 Asian Games was held at the Incheon Asiad Main Stadium, Incheon, South Korea on 30 September – 1 October.

== Schedule ==
All times are Korea Standard Time (UTC+09:00)

Date	Time	Event
Tuesday, 30 September 2014	19:10	Round 1
Wednesday, 1 October 2014	19:40	Final

== Records ==
Prior to this competition, the existing world, Asian and Games records were as follows.

World Record	Florence Griffith Joyner (USA)	21.34	Seoul, South Korea	29 September 1988
Asian Record	Li Xuemei (CHN)	22.01	Shanghai, China	22 October 1997
Games Record	Damayanthi Dharsha (SRI)	22.48	Bangkok, Thailand	18 December 1998

== Results ==
=== Round 1 ===
- Qualification: First 2 in each heat (Q) and the next 2 fastest (q) advance to the final.

==== Heat 1 ====
- Wind: 0.0 m/s

Rank	Athlete	Time	Notes
1	Olga Safronova (KAZ)	23.46	Q
2	Maryam Tousi (IRI)	23.66	Q
3	Asha Roy (IND)	23.96	
4	Dana Hussein (IRQ)	24.38	
5	Joung Han-sol (KOR)	24.73	
6	Khanrutai Pakdee (THA)	24.93	
7	Hui Man Ling (HKG)	26.18	

==== Heat 2 ====
- Wind: +1.2 m/s

Rank	Athlete	Time	Notes
1	Chisato Fukushima (JPN)	23.35	Q
2	Wei Yongli (CHN)	23.55	Q
3	Chandrika Subashini (SRI)	23.59	q
4	Kim Min-ji (KOR)	23.77	
5	Hajar Al-Khaldi (BRN)	24.50	
6	Shinoona Al-Habsi (OMA)	26.12	
7	Dil Maya Karki (NEP)	27.03	
8	Tahmina Kohistani (AFG)	31.08	

==== Heat 3 ====
- Wind: +0.9 m/s

Rank	Athlete	Time	Notes
1	Lin Huijun (CHN)	23.35	Q
2	Viktoriya Zyabkina (KAZ)	23.51	Q
3	Vũ Thị Hương (VIE)	23.57	q
4	Liao Ching-hsien (TPE)	24.10	
5	Maýsa Rejepowa (TKM)	25.34	
6	Mazoon Al-Alawi (OMA)	25.48	
7	Leung Hau Sze (HKG)	25.81	

=== Final ===
- Wind: 0.0 m/s

Rank	Athlete	Time	Notes
1st place, gold medalist(s)	Olga Safronova (KAZ)	23.02	
2nd place, silver medalist(s)	Wei Yongli (CHN)	23.27	
3rd place, bronze medalist(s)	Chisato Fukushima (JPN)	23.45	
4	Lin Huijun (CHN)	23.53	
5	Maryam Tousi (IRI)	23.64	
6	Chandrika Subashini (SRI)	23.65	
7	Viktoriya Zyabkina (KAZ)	23.69	
8	Vũ Thị Hương (VIE)	23.77	
