= Kristina Pronzhenko =

Tajikistani athlete (born 1988)

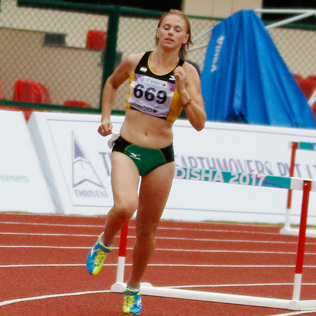
- Kristina Pronzhenko in 2017

Personal information
- Born: 10 December 1988 (age 37) Buston, Tajik SSR, Soviet Union
- Height: 1.72 m (5 ft 8 in)
- Weight: 60 kg (132 lb)

Sport
- Sport: Track and field
- Event(s): Heptathlon, sprinting
- Coached by: Leonid Pronzhenko
- Updated on 29 August 2015

Kristina Pronzhenko (Cyrillic: Кристина Пронженко; born 10 December 1988 in Mastchoh) is a Tajikistani athlete who competes primarily in the combined events. She competed in the 200 metres at the 2015 World Championships in Beijing without qualifying for the semifinals.

Her brother Aleksandr Pronzhenko is also an athlete.

== Competition record ==
Year	Competition	Venue	Position	Event	Notes
Representing Tajikistan
2013	Asian Championships	Pune, India	10th	Heptathlon	4195 pts
2014	Asian Games	Incheon, South Korea	11th	Heptathlon	4453 pts
2015	Asian Championships	Wuhan, China	10th	Heptathlon	4638 pts
2015	World Championships	Beijing, China	49th (h)	200 m	25.77 s
2016	Asian Indoor Championships	Doha, Qatar	5th	Pentathlon	3435 pts
2016	Olympic Games	Rio de Janeiro, Brazil	69th (h)	200 m	25.53 s
2017	Asian Championships	Bhubaneswar, India	6th	400 m	54.62 s
2017	Asian Championships	Bhubaneswar, India	9th (h)	400 m hurdles	61.80 s
2017	World Championships	London, United Kingdom	39th (h)	400 m hurdles	63.44 s
2017	Asian Indoor and Martial Arts Games	Ashgabat, Turkmenistan	6th	400 m	56.89 s
2017	Asian Indoor and Martial Arts Games	Ashgabat, Turkmenistan	–	Pentathlon	DNF
2018	Asian Games	Jakarta, Indonesia	12th (h)	400 m	56.59
2018	Asian Games	Jakarta, Indonesia	12th (h)	400 m hurdles	61.21
2019	Asian Championships	Doha, Qatar	7th	400 m	54.56
2019	Asian Championships	Doha, Qatar	9th (h)	400 m hurdles	59.16
2023	Asian Games	Hangzhou, China	14th (h)	400 m	57.79
2023	Asian Games	Hangzhou, China	11th (h)	400 m hurdles	63.16
