= Seika Aoyama =

Japanese sprinter (born 1996)

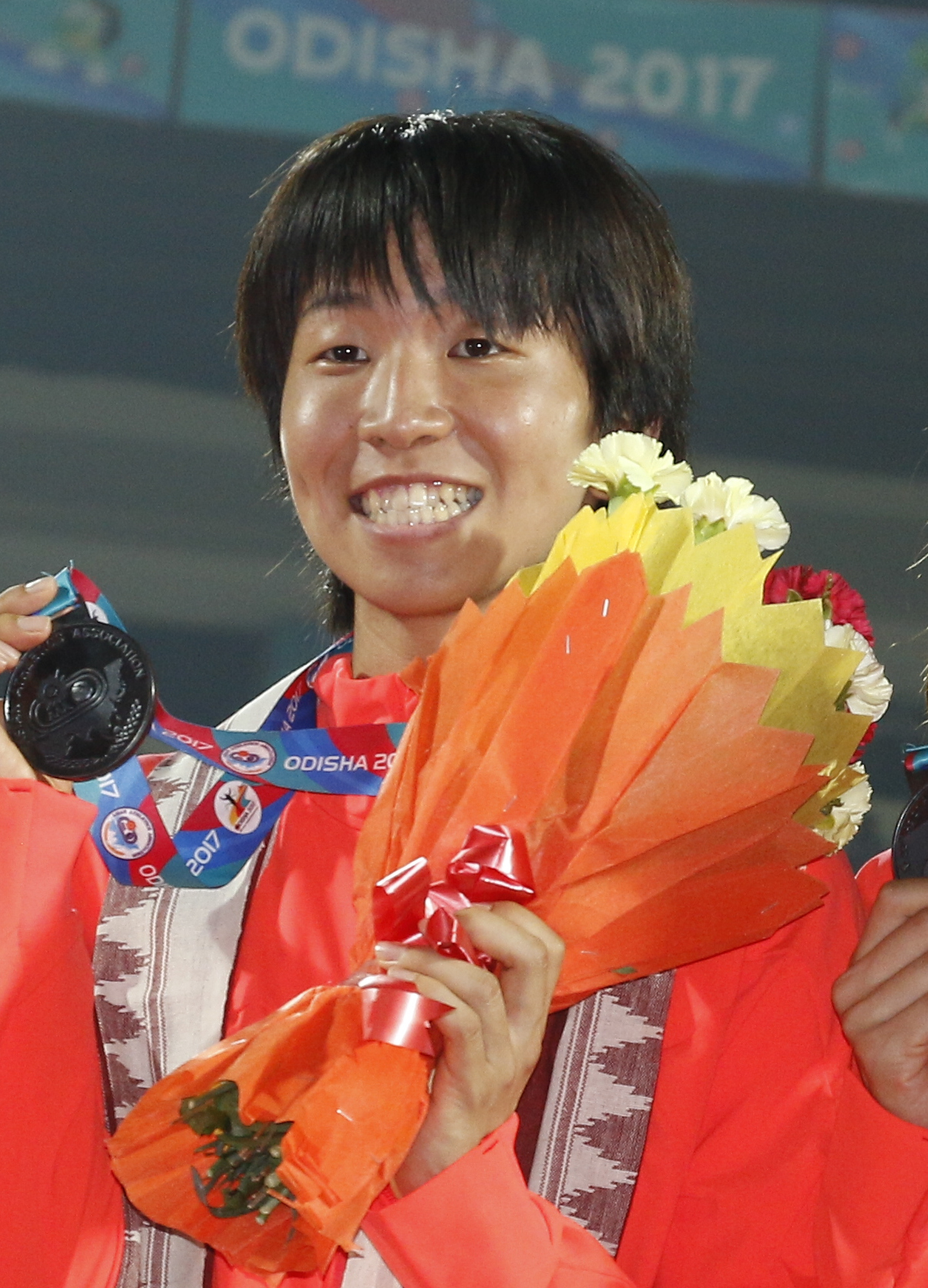
- Aoyama at the 2017 Asian Championships

Personal information
- Born: 1 May 1996 (age 30) Matsue, Shimane Prefecture, Japan
- Height: 1.71 m (5 ft 7 in)
- Weight: 56 kg (123 lb)

Sport
- Sport: Athletics
- Event: 100–400 m

Achievements and titles
- Personal bests: 100 m – 11.77 (2014); 200 m – 23.78 (2013); 400 m – 52.85 (2016)
Medal record
Representing Japan
Women's athletics
Asian Games
Silver medal – second place	2014 Incheon	4 × 400 m relay
Asian Championships
Bronze medal – third place	2017 Bhubaneswar	4 × 400 m relay
Bronze medal – third place	2019 Doha	4 × 400 m relay

Seika Aoyama (青山聖佳, Aoyama Seika; born 1 May 1996) is a Japanese sprinter specialising in the 400 metres. She competed in the 4 × 400 metres relay at the 2015 World Championships in Beijing and earlier won a silver medal in this event at the 2014 Asian Games.

== International competitions ==
Year	Competition	Venue	Position	Event	Notes
Representing Japan
2013	World Youth Championships	Donetsk, Ukraine	9th (sf)	200 m	24.01
2013	World Youth Championships	Donetsk, Ukraine	3rd	Medley relay	2:07.61
2014	Asian Games	Incheon, South Korea	5th	400 m	53.20
2014	Asian Games	Incheon, South Korea	2nd	4 × 400 m relay	3:30.80
2015	World Relays	Nassau, Bahamas	2nd (B)	4 × 400 m relay	3:34.65
2015	World Championships	Beijing, China	13th (h)	4 × 400 m relay	3:28.91
2017	Asian Championships	Bhubaneswar, India	7th	400 m	55.63
2017	Asian Championships	Bhubaneswar, India	6th	4 × 100 m relay	45.40
2017	Asian Championships	Bhubaneswar, India	3rd	4 × 400 m relay	3:37.74
2019	Asian Championships	Doha, Qatar	3rd	4 × 400 m relay	3:34.88
2019	World Relays	Yokohama, Japan	7th (B)	4 × 400 m relay	3:35.12
