= Debashree Mazumdar =

Indian sprinter (born 1991)

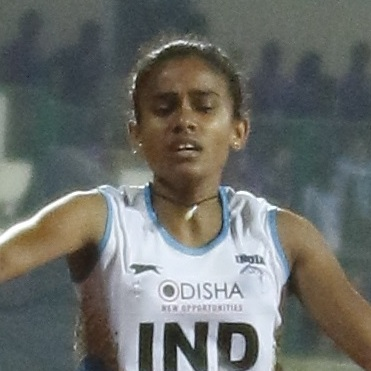
- Debashree in 2017

Personal information
- Nationality: Indian
- Born: 6 April 1991 (age 34) India
- Weight: 53

Sport
- Country: India
- Sport: Athletics
- Event: Sprint Athlete
- Team: India
- Coached by: Mr. Tapan Kumar Bhandari
- Now coaching: Mr.Amit Khanna

Achievements and titles
- World finals: 1.Gold medalist – Asian championship in 4*400 meters relay races in 2017 at Bhubaneswar in India . 2. Silver medalist – Asian championship in 4*400 meters relay races in 2015 at Wuhan China.

Debashree Mazumdar (born 6 April 1991) is an Indian sprint athlete from Kolkata who specializes in 4 × 400 metres relay races.

== Career ==
Debashree Mazumdar works for the Income Tax department as an Income Tax Inspector in Delhi.

In 2017 she was part of the winning 4 × 400 m relay team at the 2017 Asian Athletics Championships in Bhubaneswar along with M. R. Poovamma, Jisna Mathew and Nirmala Sheoran.
