= Manami Kira =

Japanese athlete

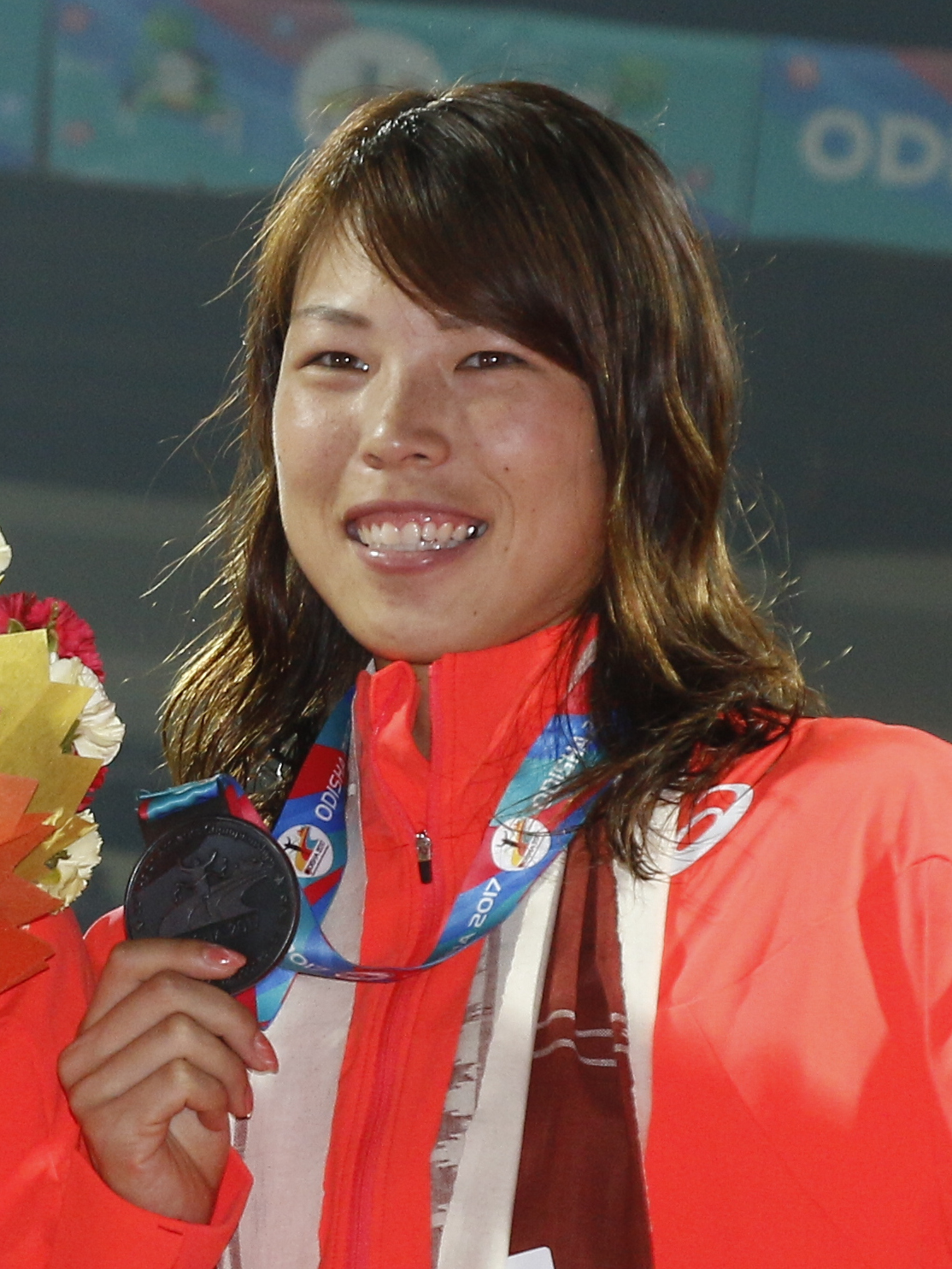
- Kira at the 2017 Asian Championships

Personal information
- Born: October 23, 1991 (age 34)

Sport
- Sport: Athletics
- Event(s): 400 m, hurdles

Achievements and titles
- Personal best(s): 400 m – 53.83 (2016); 100 mH – 13.45 (2015); 400 mH – 56.79 (2014)
Medal record
Representing Japan
Asian Athletics Championships
Silver medal – second place	2013 Balewadi	400 m hurdles
Bronze medal – third place	2013 Balewadi	4×400 m
Silver medal – second place	2015 Wuhan	400 m hurdles
Bronze medal – third place	2017 Bhubaneswar	4×400 m

Manami Kira (吉良愛美, Kira Manami; born October 23, 1991) is a Japanese sprinter and hurdler. Between 2013 and 2017 she won two silver medals in the 400 m hurdles and two bronze medals in the 4 × 400 m relay at the Asian Championships.
