= Priyanka Pawar =

Indian athlete

Personal information
- Born: 3 April 1988 (age 38) Muzaffarnagar, Uttar Pradesh, India
- Height: 168 cm (5 ft 6 in)
- Weight: 64 kg (141 lb)

Sport
- Country: India
- Sport: Track and field
- Event: 400 metres
Medal record
Women's athletics
Representing India
Asian Games
Gold medal – first place	2014 Incheon	4x400 m
Asian Indoor Championships
Gold medal – first place	2010 Tehran	4x400 m
South Asian Games
Gold medal – first place	2010 Dhaka	4x400 m
Silver medal – second place	2010 Dhaka	400 m

Priyanka Pawar (also written as Panwar) (born 3 April 1988) is an athlete from India. She won gold medal in women's 4 x 400 metres relay at the 2014 Asian Games in Incheon, South Korea along with Tintu Lukka, Mandeep Kaur and M. R. Poovamma. The team clocked 3:28:68 to break the Games Record. This is India's 4th consecutive gold in the event since 2002.

Personal bests:
Event	Result	Date
4 × 400 metres relay	3:28.68	2 October 2014
400 metres	53.40	19 August 2014
400 metres, short track	56.18	26 February 2010

== Other achievements ==
She has also won two Gold, two Silver and one bronze medal in World Railways. She has also won gold medal in various championships like Asian Championship, Asian Indoor games and SAF games.

== Controversies ==
After competing in the Asian Indoor Championships and South Asian Games in 2010, Pawar was tested positive for anabolic steroids in 2011, which lead to her being banned from competition for a two-year period. In July 2016, Pawar was banned from competition again. She was suspended by the National Anti Doping Agency (NADA) for an 8-year period.
