= 2016 Asian Junior Athletics Championships =

17th Asian Junior Athletics Championships
- Dates: 3–6 June
- Host city: Ho Chi Minh City, Vietnam
- Venue: Thống Nhất Stadium
- Level: Junior (under-20)
- Events: 44
- Records set: 2 championship records

The 2016 Asian Junior Athletics Championships was the 17th edition of the international athletics competition for Asian under-20 athletes, organised by the Asian Athletics Association and the Vietnam Athletics Federation. Athletes born between 1997 and 2000 competed in 44 events, divided evenly between the sexes. The competition took place over four days from 3–6 June at Thống Nhất Stadium in Ho Chi Minh City, Vietnam. A total of 45 countries entered athletes into the tournament, eighteen of which reached the medal table. The competition, including its opening and closing ceremonies, was broadcast live on Vietnamese carrier VTV6.

Japan topped the medal table with thirteen gold medals among a total of 27, overturning a long period of Chinese dominance. China was a comfortable second, with 22 medals, half of which were gold. India was the next best performing nation and the only other to reach double digits in the medal count, taking seven golds. The hosts Vietnam took two golds and placed seventh in the medals overall. Two championship records were broken, both by Japanese: Junya Sado won the men's javelin throw in 77.97 m (255 ft 9 1/2 in) and Chika Mukai took the 3000 m steeplechase in 10:21.04 minutes.

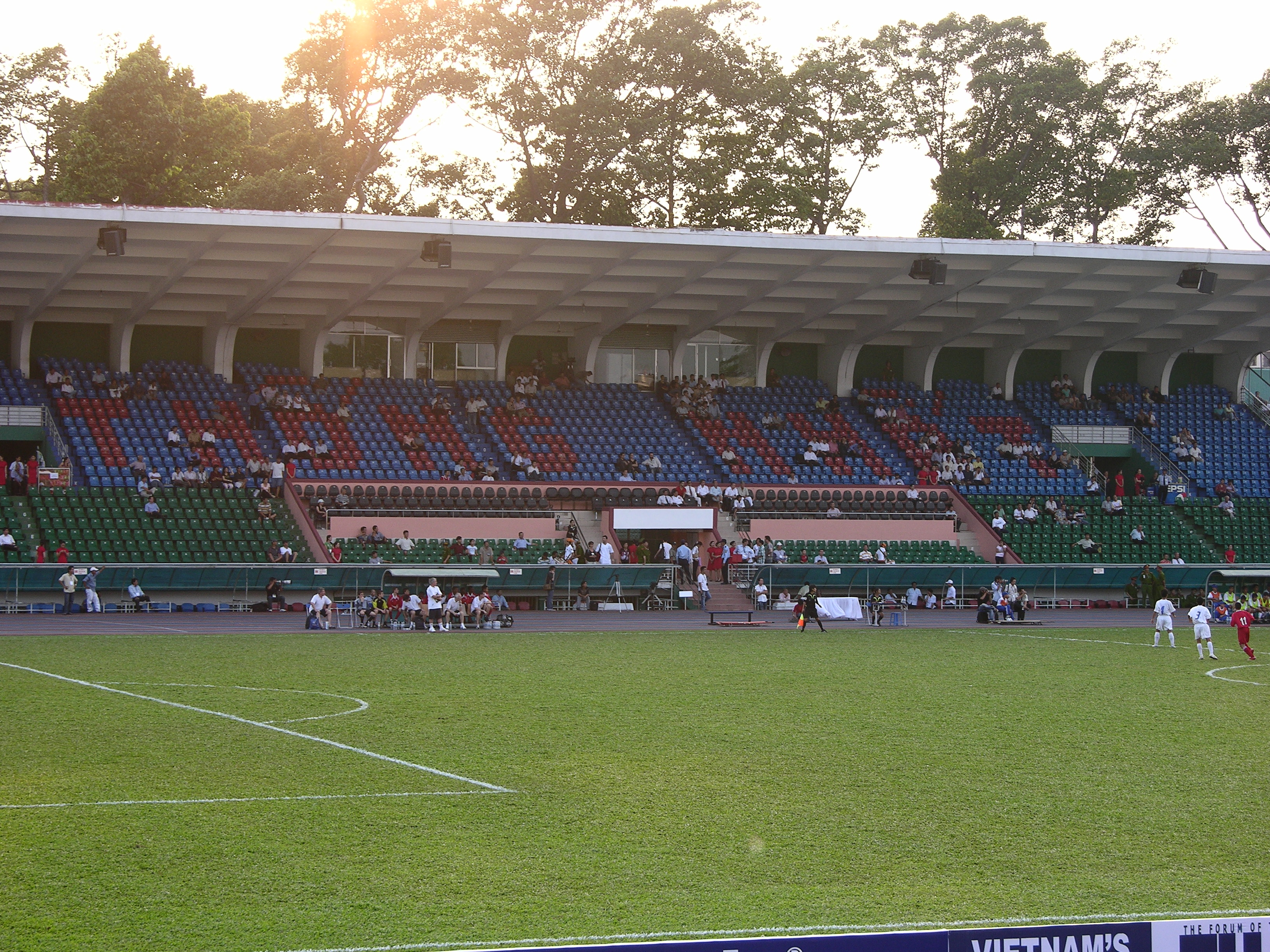
The host stadium in 2008

Malaysia's Khairul Hafiz Jantan was the most successful athlete of the competition, winning three medals: the 100 metres gold, and silvers in the 200 metres and 4 × 100 metres relay. Yang Chun-han was the only man to take two golds, topping the podium in the latter two events. On the women's side, there were two double gold medallists: Jisna Mathew led India to a 400 m individual and relay double, while Lili Das scored a middle-distance double. Japan's Haruko Ishizuka took 400 m bronze after winning the hurdles gold and her compatriots Shinichi Yukinaga and Nanaka Kori also took minor medals in the discus after becoming shot put winners.

The event was held in the month before the global 2016 IAAF World U20 Championships. Several of Asia's medallists at that competition were not present at the regional meet, although Qatar's Mohamed Ibrahim Moaaz became a double discus throw champion and India's Neeraj Chopra improved from a silver in Ho Chi Minh to a world under-20 gold with a world junior record throw. The 2016 world under-20 high jump bronze medallist Mohamat Allamine Hamdi managed only sixth on the Asian stage that year.

== Medal summary ==
=== Men ===
| Event | Gold | | Silver | | Bronze | |
|---|---|---|---|---|---|---|
| 100 metres | Khairul Hafiz Jantan; Malaysia | 10.36 | Ippei Takeda; Japan | 10.41 | Abdullah Abkar Mohammed; Saudi Arabia | 10.45 |
| 200 metres | Yang Chun-han; Chinese Taipei | 20.73 | Khairul Hafiz Jantan; Malaysia | 21.15 | Wataru Inuzuka; Japan | 21.16 |
| 400 metres | Mizuki Obuchi; Japan | 47.52 | Taha Hussein Yaseen; Iraq | 47.55 | Abdullah Djimet Souleiman; Saudi Arabia | 47.83 |
| 800 metres | Amoj Jacob; India | 1:51.82 | Idriss Mousa Youssouf; Qatar | 1:52.28 | Mohammed Raheem Al-Bazaznah; Iraq | 1:52.78 |
| 1500 metres | Ajay Kumar Saroj; India | 3:57.55 | Idriss Mousa Youssouf; Qatar | 3:58.28 | Ata Assadi; Iran | 4:03.37 |
| 5000 metres | Takato Suzuki; Japan | 14:16.42 | Akira Aizawa; Japan | 14:32.08 | Gavit Murli Kumar; India | 14:49.41 |
| 10,000 metres | Sota Watanabe; Japan | 31:23.93 | Abhishek Pal; India | 31:24.06 | Tadvi Kisan Narshi; India | 32:07.12 |
| 110 m hurdles | Mohd Rizzua Haizad Muhamad; Malaysia | 14.00 | May Mon Paulose; India | 14.02 | Zhang Tao; China | 14.05 |
| 400 m hurdles | Yoshihiro Watanabe; Japan | 50.86 | Feng Zhiqiang; China | 51.49 | Kim Hyun-bin; South Korea | 52.55 |
| 3000 m steeplechase | Mohamed Khamis Saifeldin; Qatar | 9:26.79 | Lê Trung Đức; Vietnam | 9:27.40 | Lê Quang Hoà; Vietnam | 9:31.86 |
| 10,000 m walk | Zhang Yao; China | 44:33.00 | Yasushi Morita; Japan | 44:33.79 | Song Yun-hwa; South Korea | 45:38.45 |
| 4×100 m relay | Chinese Taipei (TPE); Yeh Shou-Bo; Yang Chun-Han; Liu Chao-Hsuan; Shen Yu-Sen | 39.75 | Malaysia (MAS); Asnawi Hashim; Badrul Hisyam Abdul Manap; Muhammad Haiqal Hanafi; Khairul Hafiz Jantan | 39.91 | Thailand (THA); Chayut Khongprasit; Sakchai Laomool; Nutthapong Veeravongratanasiri; Pipat Nupuang | 40.36 |
| 4×400 m relay | Thailand (THA); Vitsanu Phosri; Nattapong Kongkraphan; Phitchaya Sunthonthuam; Phanuwat Bunfueangfu | 3:11.59 | India (IND); Murugan Kiran; Malik Pankaj; Kupar Harsh; Amoj Jacob | 3:12.12 | Saudi Arabia (KSA); Ahmed Saleh Mahda; Abdallah Djimat Souleyman; Sabir Said Essa; Yasir Yahya Hazazi | 3:12.37 |
| High jump | Keitaro Fujita; Japan | 2.16 m | Muhammad Syazwan Ahmad; Malaysia | 2.14 m | Hussein Al-Ibraheemi; Iraq | 2.14 m |
| Pole vault | Muntadher Faleh Abdulwahid; Iraq | 5.25 m | Phassapong Unsum-ang; Thailand | 5.20 m =NJR | Ali Mohsen Abed Zid; Iraq | 5.10 m |
| Long jump | Zhong Peifeng; China | 7.84 m | Tomoya Nomura; Japan | 7.75 m w | Kazuma Adachi; Japan | 7.73 m |
| Triple jump | Sung Jin-syuk; South Korea | 16.19 m | Liu Mingxuan; China | 16.05 m | Sonu Kumar; India | 15.99 m |
| Shot put | Shinichi Yukinaga; Japan | 18.41 m | Amin Lotfollahi; Iran | 17.57 m | Mehdi Rostami; Iran | 17.53 m |
| Discus throw | Mohamed Ibrahim Moaaz; Qatar | 60.49 m | Yume Ando; Japan | 58.80 m NJR | Shinichi Yukinaga; Japan | 54.79 m |
| Hammer throw | Ashish Jakhar; India | 69.00 m | Hussein Thamir Abdelwahed; Iraq | 65.71 m | Zhalolhon Tilavoldikhuzhayev; Uzbekistan | 63.77 m |
| Javelin throw | Junya Sado; Japan | 77.97 m CR | Neeraj Chopra; India | 77.60 m | Arshad Nadeem; Pakistan | 73.40 m NJR |
| Decathlon | Yuma Maruyama; Japan | 6748 pts | Wang Chen-yu; Chinese Taipei | 6624 pts | Krishna Kumar; India | 6551 pts |

=== Women ===
| Event | Gold | | Silver | | Bronze | |
|---|---|---|---|---|---|---|
| 100 metres | Liu Qun; China | 11.84 | Chloe Chan Pui Kei; Hong Kong | 11.85 NJR | On-Uma Chattha; Thailand | 11.88 |
| 200 metres | Lê Tú Chinh; Vietnam | 23.94 | Supanich Poolkerd; Thailand | 24.41 | Noor Eewan Syafiqah Md Sabri; Malaysia | 24.50 |
| 400 metres | Jisna Mathew; India | 53.85 | Huang Guifen; China | 54.92 | Haruko Ishizuka; Japan | 55.40 |
| 800 metres | Lili Das; India | 2:06.64 | Airi Ikezaki; Japan | 2:07.21 | Arina Kleshchukova; Kyrgyzstan | 2:07.56 |
| 1500 metres | Lili Das; India | 4:29.50 | Mina Ueda; Japan | 4:30.76 | Harmilankaur Bains; India Pak Jin-hyang; North Korea | 4:33.02 |
| 3000 metres | Nana Kuraoka; Japan | 9:31.46 | Pak Jin-hyang; North Korea | 9:50.72 | Choe Hyon-ju; North Korea | 10:01.94 |
| 5000 metres | Hana Omori; Japan | 16:57.39 | Misaki Ogata; Japan | 17:04.76 | Choe Hyon-ju; North Korea | 17:08.79 |
| 100 m hurdles | Yu Jiaru; China | 13.79 | Cheng Tang-hsiu; Chinese Taipei | 13.97 | Lin Shih-ting; Chinese Taipei | 14.11 |
| 400 m hurdles | Haruko Ishizuka; Japan | 57.91 | Khuất Phương Anh; Vietnam | 59.78 | Lin Yu-chieh; Chinese Taipei | 60.02 |
| 3000 m steeplechase | Chika Mukai; Japan | 10:21.04 CR | Ro Hyo-gong; North Korea | 10:31.02 | Ju Ok-byol; North Korea | 10:41.91 |
| 10,000 m walk | Wang Wenjing; China | 50:23.89 | Cun Hailu; China | 50:37.03 | Ravina; India | 51:09.48 |
| 4×100 m relay | Thailand (THA); Parichat Charoensuk; On-Uma Chatta; Sureewan Runan; Suwimon Khongthong | 45.23 | China (CHN); Liu Qun; Huang Guifen; Huang Jiaxen; Yu Jiaru | 45.41 | Hong Kong (HKG); Leung Kwan-yi; Chan Ka-sin; Kong Chun-ki; Chloe Chan Pui-kei | 45.84 NJR |
| 4×400 m relay | India (IND); Jisna Mathew; Shaharbana Sidhique Thadiyan Parambil; Subha V Liniet George | 3:43.57 | Vietnam (VIE); Khuất Phương Anh; Can Thi Thuy; Nguyen Thi Hang; Hoang Thi Minh Hanh | 3:44.56 NJR | Thailand (THA); Supanich Poolkerd; Thanphimon Kaeodi; Manrika Phonyam; Apinya Athiwet | 3:50.79 |
| High jump | Chai Yanbo; China | 1.74 m | Nadezhda Dubovitskaya; Kazakhstan | 1.74 m | Tsai Ching-jung; Chinese Taipei | 1.71 m |
| Pole vault | Chen Qiaoling; China | 4.15 m | Misaki Morota; Japan | 3.80 m | Wu Chia-ju; Chinese Taipei | 3.60 m |
| Long jump | Nguyễn Thị Trúc Mai; Vietnam | 6.34 m NJR | Parinya Chuaimaroeng; Thailand | 6.28 m NJR | Yao Jiayu; China | 6.04 m |
| Triple jump | Kirthana Ramasamy; Malaysia | 13.20 m NJR | Mariya Ovchinnikova; Kazakhstan | 13.19 m | Anna Gorodkova; Kazakhstan | 12.97 m |
| Shot put | Nanaka Kori; Japan | 15.89 m NJR | Dong Yu; China | 14.23 m | Liu Ziyue; China | 14.22 m |
| Discus throw | Yang Huanhuan; China | 51.47 m | Nanaka Kori; Japan | 48.04 m | Zhou Zixuan; China | 46.57 m |
| Hammer throw | Zhao Fan; China | 61.77 m | Ji Li; China | 58.11 m | Mingkamon Koomphon; Thailand | 56.44 m |
| Javelin throw | Su Lingdan; China | 57.32 m | Chang Chu; Chinese Taipei | 53.14 m | Varvara Nazarova; Kazakhstan | 52.76 m NR |
| Heptathlon | Du Jiani; China | 5031 pts | Aleksandra Yurkevskaya; Uzbekistan | 4859 pts | Nguyễn Linh Na; Vietnam | 4564 pts |

== 2016 Medal table ==
Key

The host country is highlighted in lavender blue

| Rank | Nation | Gold | Silver | Bronze | Total |
|---|---|---|---|---|---|
| 1 | Japan (JPN) | 13 | 10 | 4 | 27 |
| 2 | China (CHN) | 11 | 7 | 4 | 22 |
| 3 | India (IND) | 7 | 4 | 6 | 17 |
| 4 | Malaysia (MAS) | 3 | 3 | 1 | 7 |
| 5 | Chinese Taipei (TPE) | 2 | 3 | 4 | 9 |
| 5 | Thailand (THA) | 2 | 3 | 4 | 9 |
| 7 | Vietnam (VIE)* | 2 | 3 | 2 | 7 |
| 8 | Qatar (QAT) | 2 | 2 | 0 | 4 |
| 9 | Iraq (IRQ) | 1 | 2 | 3 | 6 |
| 10 | South Korea (KOR) | 1 | 0 | 2 | 3 |
| 11 | North Korea (PRK) | 0 | 2 | 4 | 6 |
| 12 | Kazakhstan (KAZ) | 0 | 2 | 2 | 4 |
| 13 | Iran (IRI) | 0 | 1 | 2 | 3 |
| 14 | Hong Kong (HKG) | 0 | 1 | 1 | 2 |
| 14 | Uzbekistan (UZB) | 0 | 1 | 1 | 2 |
| 16 | Saudi Arabia (KSA) | 0 | 0 | 3 | 3 |
| 17 | Kyrgyzstan (KGZ) | 0 | 0 | 1 | 1 |
| 17 | Pakistan (PAK) | 0 | 0 | 1 | 1 |
| Totals (18 entries) | | 44 | 44 | 45 | 133 |
