= Poovamma Machettira =

Indian sprinter

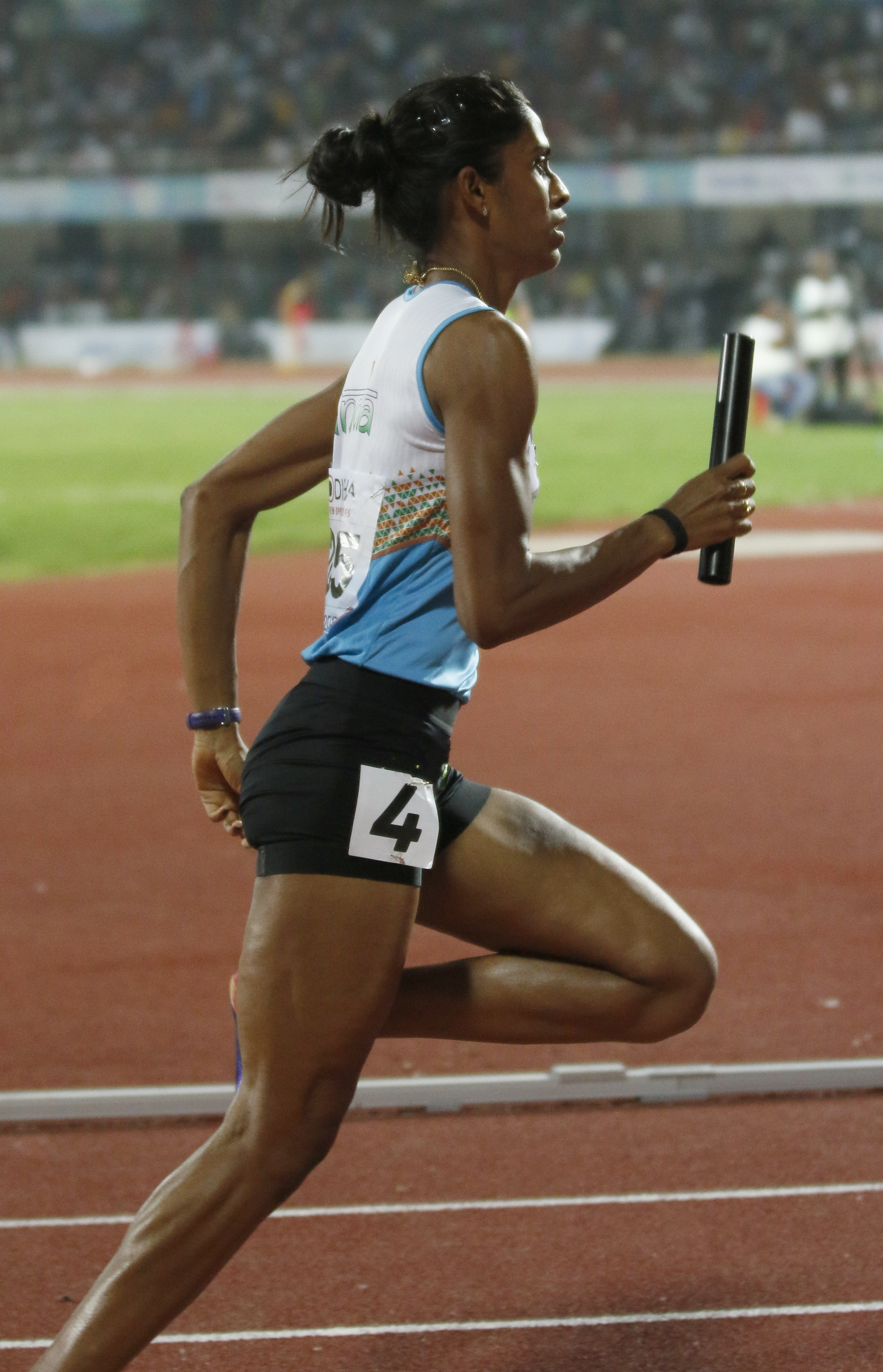
- Poovamma at the 2017 Asian Championships

Personal information
- Full name: Poovamma Raju Machettira
- Born: 5 June 1990 (age 36) Gonikoppal, Karnataka, India
- Height: 173 cm (5 ft 8 in)
- Weight: 60 kg (132 lb)

Sport
- Country: India
- Sport: Athletics
- Event: 200–800 m
- Club: Oil and Natural Gas Corporation
- Coached by: Nagapuri Ramesh

Achievements and titles
- Personal bests: 200 m – 24.31 (2018); 400 m – 51.73 (2014); 800 m – 2:09.24 (2017)
Medal record
Representing India
Asian Games
Gold medal – first place	2014 Incheon	Women's 4 × 400 m
Gold medal – first place	2018 Jakarta	Women's 4 × 400 m
Gold medal – first place	2018 Jakarta	Mixed 4 × 400 m
Gold medal – first place	2026 Aichi–Nagoya	4 × 400 m
Silver medal – second place	2026 Aichi–Nagoya	4 × 400 m mixed
Bronze medal – third place	2014 Incheon	400 m
Asian Championships
Gold medal – first place	2013 Pune	Women's 4 × 400 m
Silver medal – second place	2013 Pune	400 m
Silver medal – second place	2015 Wuhan	400 m
Bronze medal – third place	2019 Doha	400 m
Silver medal – second place	2015 Wuhan	Women's 4 × 400 m
Silver medal – second place	2019 Doha	Women's 4 × 400 m
Silver medal – second place	2019 Doha	Mixed 4 × 400 m
South Asian Games
Gold medal – first place	2016 Guwahati	400 m

Poovamma Raju Machettira (born 5 June 1990) is an Indian sprinter who specialises in the 400 metres distance. As a member of the Indian 4 × 400 m relay teams she participated in the 2016 Olympics and won gold medals at the 2014 and 2018 Asian Games and 2013 and 2017 Asian championships; individually she won a silver medal in 2013 and a bronze in 2014 at those competitions. She received the Arjuna Award in 2015 for her contributions to athletics.She was banned for a period of two years following a failed doping test in February 2021.

== Early life ==
Poovamma was born to M. G. Raju and Jaji. She completed her primary and higher education in Mangalore and acquired her bachelor's degree in business management from the Sri Dharmasthala Manjunatheshwara College of business management, Karnataka. Her brother MR Manju also competed in the 400 m events at the national level.

== Career highlights ==
Poovamma won a silver medal in the 400 m and a gold in the 4 × 400 m relay at the 2008 Commonwealth Youth Games. She then won a senior national 400 m title in September 2011 in Kolkata. At the 2012 Asian Grands Prix Poovamma won two gold and a silver medal. She also won a gold medal at the 2013 Asian Grand Prix in Bangkok. Poovamma represented India in the Moscow World Athletics Championships 2013 where she was also a part of the women's 4 × 400 m relay team.

She won the gold medal in women's 4 × 400 metres relay at the 2014 Asian Games in Incheon, South Korea along with Tintu Luka, Mandeep Kaur and Priyanka Pawar. The team clocked 3:28:68 to break the Games Record. This is India's 4th consecutive gold in the event since 2002.

In 2017 she was part of the winning 4 × 400 m team at the 2017 Asian Athletics Championships in Bhubaneshwar, which also included Debashree Mazumdar, Jisna Mathew and Nirmala Sheoran. The team had a problematic baton exchange, but Nirmala recovered the time in the final leg.

== Competition record ==
Year	Competition	Venue	Position	Event	Notes
Representing India
2006	World Junior Championships	Beijing, China	7th (h)	400 m	56.39
2007	World Youth Championships	Ostrava, Czech Republic	7th	400 m	55.49
2008	World Junior Championships	Bydgoszcz, Poland	8th (h)	400 m	57.94
2008	Commonwealth Youth Games	Pune, India	2nd	400 m	55.17
2008	Commonwealth Youth Games	Pune, India	1st	4 × 400 m relay	3:42.02
2013	Asian Championships	Pune, India	2nd	400 m	53.37
2013	Asian Championships	Pune, India	1st	4 × 400 m relay	3:32.26
2013	World Championships	Moscow, Russia	5th (h)	4 × 400 m relay	3:38.81
2014	Asian Games	Incheon, South Korea	3rd	400 m	52.36
2014	Asian Games	Incheon, South Korea	1st	4 × 400 m relay	3:28.68
2015	Asian Championships	Wuhan, China	2nd	400 m	53.07
2015	Asian Championships	Wuhan, China	2nd	4 × 400 m relay	3:33.81
2015	World Championships	Beijing, China	14th (h)	4 × 400 m relay	3:29.08
2016	Olympic Games	Rio de Janeiro, Brazil	7th (h)	4 × 400 m relay	3:29.53
2017	Asian Championships	Bhubaneswar, India	4th	400 m	53.36
2018	Commonwealth Games	Gold Coast, Australia	24th (h)	400 m	53.72
2018	Commonwealth Games	Gold Coast, Australia	7th	4 × 400 m relay	3:33.61
2018	Asian Games	Jakarta, Indonesia	1st	4 × 400 m relay	3:28.72
2019	World Championships	Doha, Qatar	11th (h)	4 × 400 m relay	3:29.42
2024	Olympic Games	Paris, France	15th (h)	4 × 400 m relay	3:32.51
2026	Asian Games	Aichi Prefecture	1st	4 × 400 m relay	3:29.69
