= Anu Mariam Jose =

Indian Track and Field Athlete

Personal information
- Nationality: Indian

Sport
- Country: India
- Sport: Athletics
Medal record
Women's athletics
Representing India
Asian Championships
Gold medal – first place	2013 Pune	4 × 400 m

Anu Mariam Jose is an Indian athlete. She won a gold medal in the 4 × 400 m relay in the 2013 Asian Athletics Championships.
