= Zhao Yanmin =

Chinese sprinter (born 1991)

Medal record

Women's athletics

Representing China

Asian Championships
Gold medal – first place	2013 Pune	400 m

Zhao Yanmin (Chinese: 赵艳敏; born 16 January 1991) is a Chinese track and field sprint athlete who specialises in the 400 metres. She has a personal best of 52.49 seconds and was the gold medallist in the event at the Asian Athletics Championships in 2013.

== Career ==
Born in Liaocheng, Shen County in China's Shandong province, Zhao Yanmin was the only child of Ji and Gui, both of whom were fruit and vegetable farmers in the rural area surrounding the city. She discovered her talent for sprinting around the age of thirteen while competing in 100 metres and 200 metres races at school.

Her teacher in physical education told her to develop her technique, but her father and other teachers disapproved – Zhao had done very well in her studies and they wanted her to focus on more academic activities. Zhao's passion for sport grew, however, and after a good performance at the provincial schools championships she gained a scholarship to train at the Shandong Institute of Physical Education in Jinan in 2005. At the age of fourteen she moved away from the family to live and train at the sports institute.

In 2007, she was third in the 400 m at the youth championships and sixth at the Chinese Athletics Championships. She repeated that finish at the nationals the following year and won the 2009 Chinese junior title with a personal best of 52.97 seconds. At the 11th Chinese Games she ran for Shandong in the 4×400 metres relay and helped her province to second place alongside former Asian champion Huang Xiaoxiao. In 2010, she did a 200/400 m double at the Chinese junior championships and was second and third, respectively, in those events at the national championships.

Her first international medal came that year at the 2010 Asian Junior Athletics Championships in Hanoi, where she was the 400 m bronze medallist. A personal best of 52.62 seconds came at the 2011 Chinese Championships, where she again placed in the top three of both the long sprints. She competed only on the national circuit in 2012 and peaked at the national championships with second in the 400 m and fourth in the 200 m.

Zhao focused on the 400 m in the 2013 season and was rewarded with her first senior medals at the age of 22. She was selected for the 2013 Asian Athletics Championships and won the gold medal with a personal best of 52.49 seconds. A silver medal followed in the 4×400 metres relay.
