= Jisna Mathew =

Indian sprinter

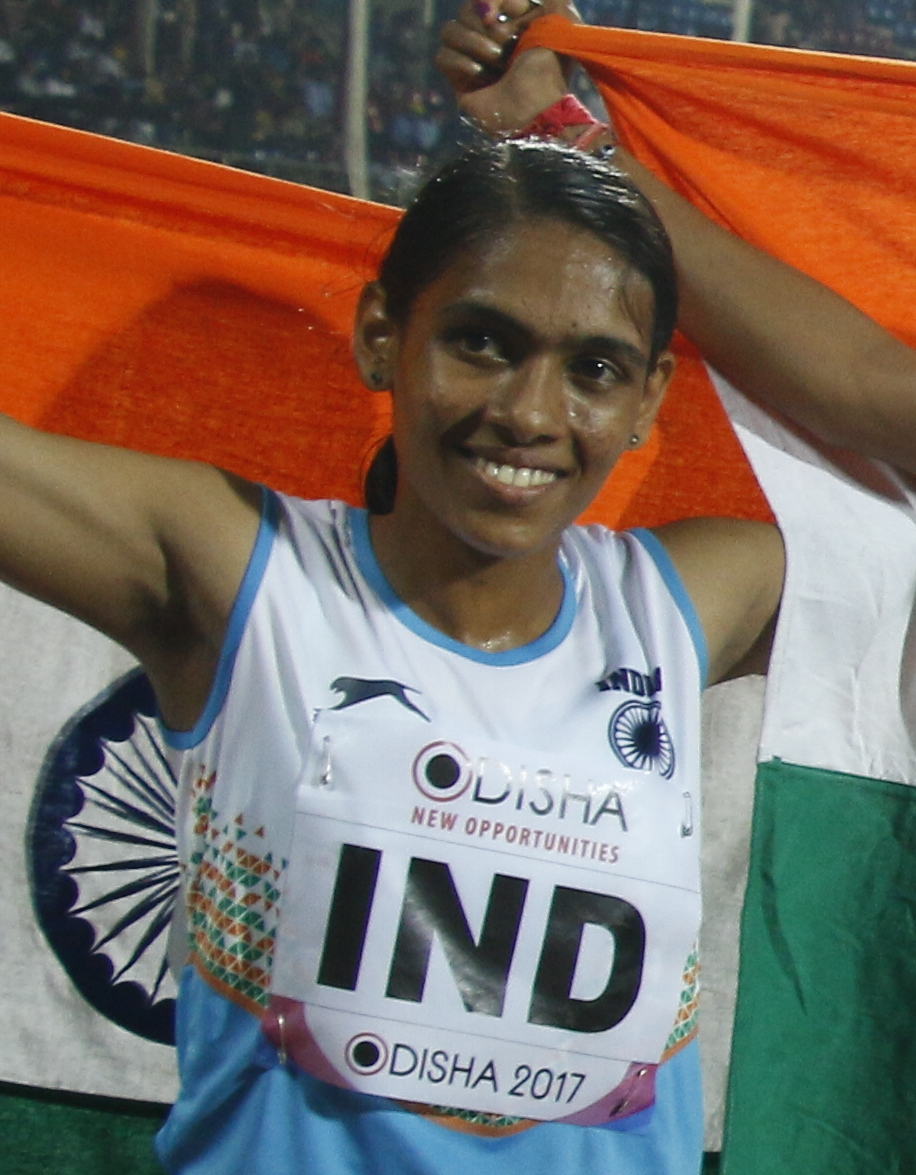
- Mathew at the 2017 Asian Championships

Personal information
- Born: 7 January 1999 (age 27) Alakode, Kerala, India
- Height: 1.55 m (5 ft 1 in)

Sport
- Sport: Track and field
- Event: 400 m

Achievements and titles
- Personal bests: 100 m: 11.08 (2015); 200 m: 22.98 (2017); 400 m: 50.65 (2017)
Medal record
Women's athletics
Representing India
Asian Championships
Gold medal – first place	2025 Gumi	4x400m
Silver medal – second place	2015 Wuhan	4x400m
Silver medal – second place	2017 Bhubaneswar	400 m
Asian U20 Championships
Gold medal – first place	2016 Ho Chi Minh City	400 m
Gold medal – first place	2016 Ho Chi Minh City	4×400m
Gold medal – first place	2018 Gifu	400 m
Silver medal – second place	2018 Gifu	4×400m
Bronze medal – third place	2018 Gifu	200 m
Asian U18 Championships
Silver medal – second place	2015 Doha	400 m
Commonwealth Youth Games
Silver medal – second place	2015 Apia	400 m

Jisna Mathew (born 7 January 1999) is an Indian track and field sprinter who specializes in 400 m events. She represented India in 2016 Rio Olympics.

== Career ==
Born in Alakode, Kannur district, Kerala, Jisna was admitted to the Usha School of Athletics in 2011.

She won the 400 meters silver medal at the 2015 Commonwealth Youth Games and the 2015 Asian Youth Athletics Championships.

She was part of the India's women's 4 × 400 metres relay team at the 2016 Summer Olympics.

She won the 400 m and 4 × 400 metres relay at the 2016 Asian Junior Athletics Championships. She won three medals at the 2018 Asian Junior Athletics Championships: gold in the 400 m, silver in the 4 × 400 m relay, and bronze in the 200 meters.

She won the women's 4 × 400 m relay and the women's 400 m bronze at the 2017 Asian Athletics Championships. In 2019, her relay teammate and 400 m champion at the event Nirmala Sheoran, was disqualified fro her results from 15 August 2016 to 21 November 2018 for doping. As a result, India were striped of their relay title, and Jisna's 400 m bronze was upgraded to silver.

Jisna was part of the Indian team that finished 7th in the mixed 4 × 400 metres relay final at the 2019 World Athletics Championships.
