= 2013 Asian Athletics Championships =

2013 Asian Championships
- Dates: 3–7 July
- Host city: Pune, India
- Venue: Shiv Chhatrapati Stadium
- Events: 42
- Participation: 522 athletes from 42 nations

The 2013 Asian Athletics Championships were the 20th edition of the biennial athletics competition between Asian nations. It was held at the Shree Shiv Chhatrapati Sports Complex in Balewadi, Pune, India between 3–7 July. Around 522 athletes from 42 nations competed at the event. It was the first time since 1989 that India had hosted the championships.

Prior to the competition, the election of the Asian Athletics Association president was convened in Pune. Qatar's Dahlan Jumaan al-Hamad (an IAAF vice-president) defeated the incumbent, Suresh Kalmadi of India, by a margin of 20 votes to 18. Kalmadi, on bail for corruption charges stemming from the 2010 Commonwealth Games in Delhi, did not attend the championships. The Chief Minister of Maharashtra, Prithviraj Chavan, declared the event open at the championships opening ceremony

China, the traditional regional leader at the competition, easily took the top spot in the medal rankings with sixteen gold medals and 27 medals in total. This maintained its streak as the best nation of the tournament – a run dating back to the 1983 edition. Second-placed Bahrain took five golds and fifteen medals overall (although Ali Khamis Khamis, the 400 metres runner-up, was their only native-born medallist). Japan placed third in the medal rankings with four golds and had the second greatest overall haul with 20 medals. In fifth place the hosts India had the next biggest haul, with 17 medals in total, although Saudi Arabia and Uzbekistan had a greater number of gold medals.

The overall quality of the competition was reduced as several top Asian athletes were absent. Mutaz Essa Barshim was the only Asian 2012 Olympic medallist who intended to participate, but he withdrew due to a back injury. Thirteen champions from 2011 were present and six of them (Su Bingtian, Yousef Masrahi, Dejene Regassa, Shitaye Eshete, Satomi Kubokura, and Wassanee Winatho) successfully defended their title.

A total of eight championships records were bettered at the competition: Shitaye Eshete broke the longest-standing of these by winning the women's 10,000 metres in 32:17.29 minutes, breaking Zhong Huandi's time from 1989. The organisers used a performance-based points system to assign the titles of best athlete at the championships: Saudi 400 metres champion Yousef Masrahi was the best male with 1172 points while Bahrain's steeplechase winner Ruth Jebet was the best female with 1142 points.

The Athletics Federation of India withdrew an unnamed female shot putter from their squad for a failed doping test one day before the opening of the championships.

== Hosting issues ==
The competition was originally set to take place in Chennai, Tamil Nadu. Jayalalithaa, the Chief Minister of the state, ordered the removal of Sri Lanka from the competition on the grounds of war crimes committed during the Sri Lankan Civil War. This request was ignored by the Athletics Federation of India and in February 2013 Chennai withdrew as hosts of the championships.

The federation approached the state governments of Jharkhand and Delhi, with the venues of Ranchi and New Delhi being suggested, but both states refused the host duties. Finally, in May the Maharashtra government agreed to host the event in Pune on the same dates agreed for the Chennai event. Pune already had a suitable track and field stadium that had recently played host to the Commonwealth Youth Games in 2008. The budget given for the championships, however, was significantly reduced.

== Medal summary ==
=== Men ===
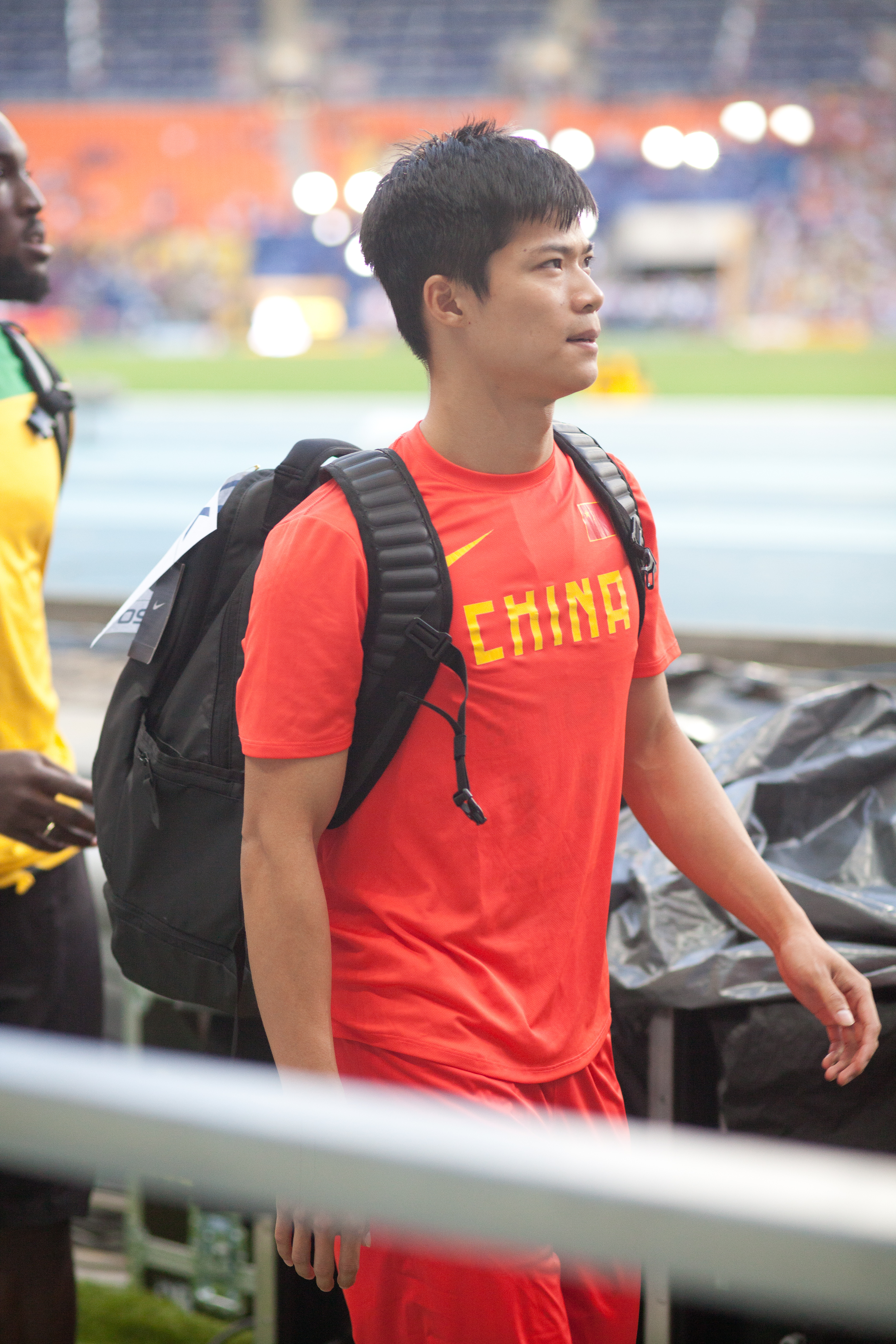
Su Bingtian of China, winner of the men's 100 metres.

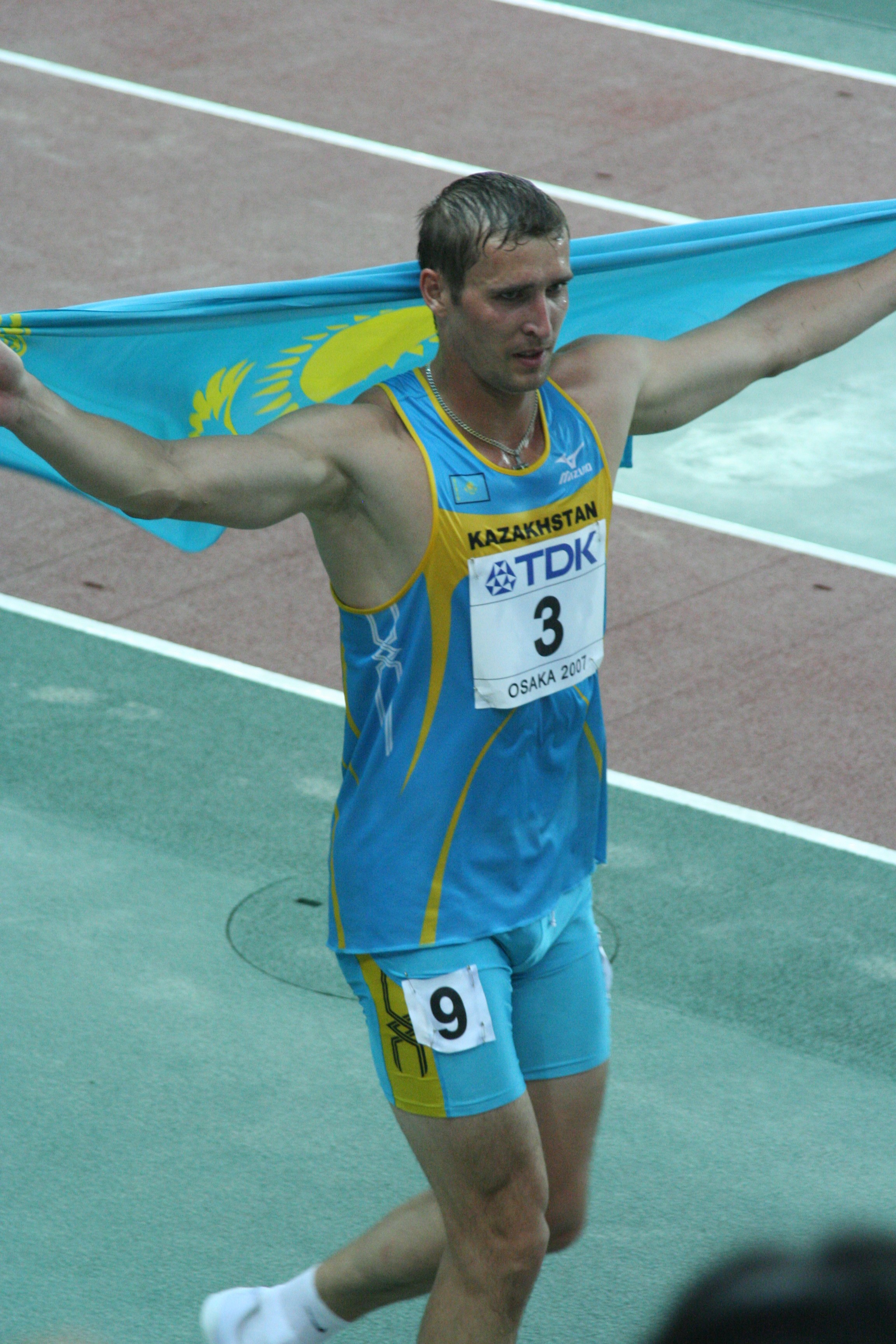
Dmitriy Karpov of Kazakhstan, winner of the men's decathlon.

Event	Gold		Silver		Bronze	
100 metres	Su Bingtian; China	10.17	Samuel Francis; Qatar	10.27	Barakat Al-Harthi; Oman	10.30
200 metres	Xie Zhenye; China	20.87	Fahhad Mohammed Al Subaie; Saudi Arabia	20.92	Kei Takase; Japan	20.92
400 metres	Yousef Masrahi; Saudi Arabia	45.08	Ali Khamis Khamis; Bahrain	45.65	Yuzo Kanemaru; Japan	45.95
800 metres	Musaeb Abdulrahman Balla; Qatar	1:46.92	Abdulaziz Ladan; Saudi Arabia	1:47.01	Belal Mansoor Ali; Bahrain	1:48.56
1500 metres	Emad Noor; Saudi Arabia	3:39.51	Mohamad Al-Garni; Qatar	3:40.75	Belal Mansoor Ali; Bahrain	3:40.96
5000 metres	Dejene Regassa Mootoma; Bahrain	13:53.25	Alemu Bekele Gebre; Bahrain	13:57.23	Emad Noor; Saudi Arabia	14:05.88
10,000 metres	Alemu Bekele Gebre; Bahrain	28:47.26	Bilisuma Shugi; Bahrain	28:58.67	Ratiram Saini; India	29:35.42
110 metres hurdles	Jiang Fan; China	13.61	Abdulaziz Al Mandeel; Kuwait	13.78	Wataru Yazawa; Japan	13.88
400 metres hurdles	Yasuhiro Fueki; Japan	49.86	Cheng Wen; China	50.07	Satinder Singh; India	50.35
3000 metres steeplechase	Tareq Mubarak Taher; Bahrain	8:34.77	Dejene Regassa Mootoma; Bahrain	8:37.40	Tsuyoshi Takeda; Japan	8:48.48
4 × 100 metres relay	Hong Kong (HKG); Tang Yik Chun; Lai Chun Ho; Ng Ka Fung; Tsui Chi Ho	38.94	Japan (JPN); Kazuma Oseto; Kei Takase; Sota Kawatsura; Yuichi Kobayashi	39.11	China (CHN); Guo Fan; Xie Zhenye; Su Bingtian; Chen Qiang	39.17
4 × 400 metres relay	Saudi Arabia (KSA); Mohammed Ali Al-Bishi; Fahhad Mohammed Al Subaie; Mohammed Al-Salhi; Yousef Masrahi	3:02.53 CR	Japan (JPN); Yusuke Ishitsuka; Yuzo Kanemaru; Kazuya Watanabe; Hideyuki Hirose	3:04.46	Sri Lanka (SRI); Chanaka Dulan Priyashantha; Dilan Aloka; Kasun Seneviratne; Anjana Madushan	3:04.92
High jump	Bi Xiaoliang; China	2.21 m	Jithin Thomas; India Keyvan Ghanbarzadeh; Iran	2.21 m	Not awarded	
Pole vault	Xue Changrui; China	5.60 m	Lu Yao; China	5.20 m	Jin Min-Sub; South Korea	5.20 m
Long jump	Wang Jianan; China	7.95 m	Kumaravel Premkumar; India	7.92 m	Tang Gongchen; China	7.89 m
Triple jump	Cao Shuo; China	16.77 m	Renjith Maheshwary; India	16.76 m	Arpinder Singh; India	16.58 m
Shot put	Sultan Al-Hebshi; Saudi Arabia	19.68 m	Chang Ming-huang; Chinese Taipei	19.61 m	Om Prakash Singh; India	19.45 m
Discus throw	Vikas Gowda; India	64.90 m	Mohammad Samimi; Iran	61.93 m	Ahmed Mohamed Dheeb; Qatar	60.82 m
Hammer throw	Dilshod Nazarov; Tajikistan	78.32 m	Ali Al-Zinkawi; Kuwait	74.70 m	Qi Dakai; China	74.19 m
Javelin throw	Ivan Zaytsev; Uzbekistan	79.76 m	Sachith Maduranga; Sri Lanka	79.62 m NR	Samarjit Singh; India	75.03 m
Decathlon	Dmitriy Karpov; Kazakhstan	8037 pts CR	Akihiko Nakamura; Japan	7620 pts	Leonid Andreev; Uzbekistan	7383 pts

=== Women ===
Event	Gold		Silver		Bronze	
100 metres	Wei Yongli; China	11.29	Chisato Fukushima; Japan	11.53	Tao Yujia; China	11.63
200 metres	Viktoriya Zyabkina; Kazakhstan	23.62	Asha Roy; India	23.71	Dutee Chand; India	23.82
400 metres	Zhao Yanmin; China	52.49	Poovamma Raju Machettira; India	53.37	Gretta Taslakian; Lebanon	53.43 NR
800 metres	Wang Chunyu; China	2:02.47	Genzeb Shumi; Bahrain	2:04.16	Tintu Luka; India	2:04.48
1500 metres	Betlhem Desalegn; United Arab Emirates	4:13.67	Mimi Belete; Bahrain	4:14.04	Ayako Jinnouchi; Japan	4:16.73
5000 metres	Betlhem Desalegn; United Arab Emirates	15:12.84 CR NR	Shitaye Eshete; Bahrain	15:22.17	Tejitu Daba; Bahrain	15:38.63
10,000 metres	Shitaye Eshete; Bahrain	32:17.29; CR	Alia Saeed; United Arab Emirates	32:39.39	Ayumi Hagiwara; Japan	32.47.44
100 metres hurdles	Ayako Kimura; Japan	13.25	Anastassiya Soprunova; Kazakhstan	13.44	Jayapal Hemasree; India	14.01
400 metres hurdles	Satomi Kubokura; Japan	56.82	Manami Kira; Japan	57.78	Jo Eun-Ju; South Korea	58.21
3000 metres steeplechase	Ruth Jebet; Bahrain	9:40.84 CR	Sudha Singh; India	9:56.27	Pak Kum Hyang; North Korea	10:09.80
4 × 100 metres relay	China (CHN); Tao Yujia; Li Manyuan; Lin Huijun; Wei Yongli	44.01	Japan (JPN); Saori Kitakaze; Chisato Fukushima; Mayumi Watanabe; Anna Fujimori	44.38	Thailand (THA); Phatsorn Jaksuninkorn; Orranut Klomdee; Tassaporn Wannakit; Jintara Seangdee	44.44
4 × 400 metres relay	India (IND); Nirmla; Tintu Luka; Anu Mariam Jose; Poovamma Raju Machettira	3:32.26	China (CHN); Chen Lin; Cheng Chong; Geng Qingyu; Zhao Yanmin	3:35.31	Japan (JPN); Asami Chiba; Sayaka Aoki; Satomi Kubokura; Manami Kira	3:35.72
High jump	Nadiya Dusanova; Uzbekistan	1.90 m	Svetlana Radzivil; Uzbekistan	1.88 m	Marina Aitova; Kazakhstan	1.88 m
Pole vault	Li Ling; China	4.54 m CR	Ren Mengqian; China	4.40 m	Sukanya Chomchuendee; Thailand	4.15 m
Long jump	Sachiko Masumi; Japan	6.55 m	Anastasiya Juravleva; Uzbekistan	6.36 m	Mayookha Johny; India	6.30 m
Triple jump	Anastasiya Juravleva; Uzbekistan	14.18 m	Aleksandra Kotlyarova; Uzbekistan	13.89 m	Irina Litvinenko Ektova; Kazakhstan	13.75 m
Shot put	Liu Xiangrong; China	18.67 m	Leyla Rajabi; Iran	18.18 m	Gao Yang; China	17.76 m
Discus throw	Su Xinyue; China	55.88 m	Jiang Fengjing; China	55.70 m	Li Tsai-Yi; Chinese Taipei	55.32 m
Hammer throw	Wang Zheng; China	72.78 m CR	Liu Tingting; China	67.16 m	Masumi Aya; Japan	63.41 m
Javelin throw	Li Lingwei; China	60.65 m CR	Nadeeka Lakmali; Sri Lanka	60.16 m NR	Risa Miyashita; Japan	55.30 m
Heptathlon	Wassana Winatho; Thailand	5818 pts	Ekaterina Voronina; Uzbekistan	5599 pts	Chie Kiriyama; Japan	5451 pts

== Medal table ==
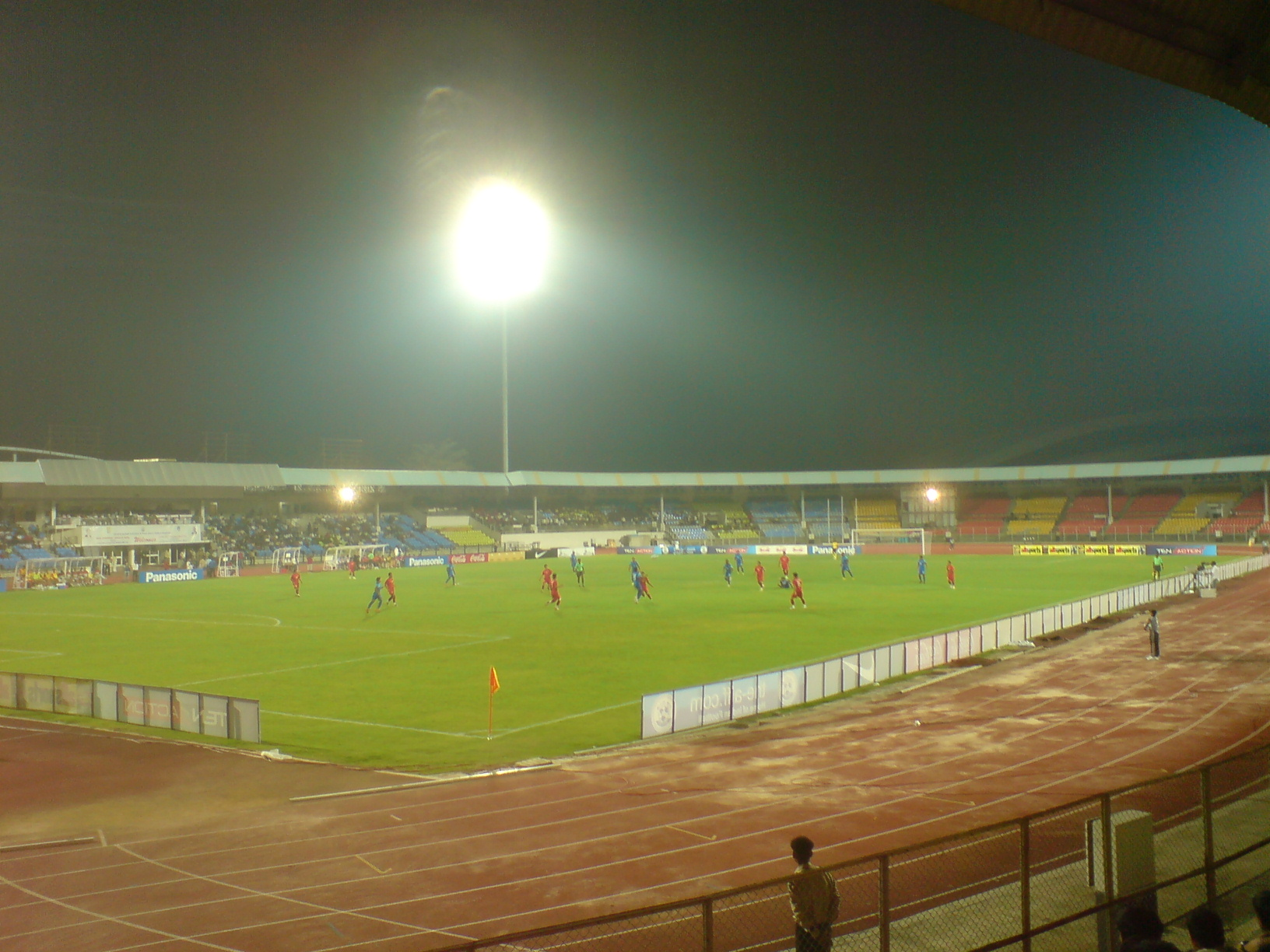
The host stadium in Pune

* Host nation (India)

Rank	Nation	Gold	Silver	Bronze	Total
1	China (CHN)	16	6	5	27
2	Bahrain (BHR)	5	7	3	15
3	Japan (JPN)	4	6	10	20
4	Saudi Arabia (KSA)	4	2	1	7
5	Uzbekistan (UZB)	3	4	1	8
6	India (IND)*	2	6	9	17
7	Kazakhstan (KAZ)	2	1	2	5
8	United Arab Emirates (UAE)	2	1	0	3
9	Qatar (QAT)	1	2	1	4
10	Thailand (THA)	1	0	2	3
11	Hong Kong (HKG)	1	0	0	1
11	Tajikistan (TJK)	1	0	0	1
13	Iran (IRI)	0	3	0	3
14	Sri Lanka (SRI)	0	2	1	3
15	Kuwait (KUW)	0	2	0	2
16	Chinese Taipei (TPE)	0	1	1	2
17	South Korea (KOR)	0	0	2	2
18	Lebanon (LIB)	0	0	1	1
18	North Korea (PRK)	0	0	1	1
18	Oman (OMA)	0	0	1	1
Totals (20 entries)		42	43	41	126

== Participating nations ==
- Afghanistan (5)
- Bahrain (20)
- Bangladesh (5)
- Brunei (2)
- Cambodia (2)
- China (43)
- Chinese Taipei (17)
- Hong Kong (16)
- India (101)
- Indonesia (4)
- Iran (20)
- Iraq (5)
- Japan (51)
- Jordan (1)
- Kazakhstan (24)
- Kuwait (6)
- Kyrgyzstan (5)
- Laos (2)
- Lebanon (4)
- Macau (5)
- Malaysia (7)
- Maldives (5)
- Mongolia (2)
- Nepal (4)
- North Korea (3)
- Oman (5)
- Pakistan (5)
- Palestine (1)
- Philippines (14)
- Qatar (17)
- Saudi Arabia (14)
- Singapore (4)
- South Korea (18)
- Sri Lanka (18)
- Syria (3)
- Tajikistan (3)
- Thailand (22)
- Timor-Leste (3)
- United Arab Emirates (5)
- Uzbekistan (19)
- Vietnam (8)
- Yemen (5)
