= Nirmala Sheoran =

Indian sprinter

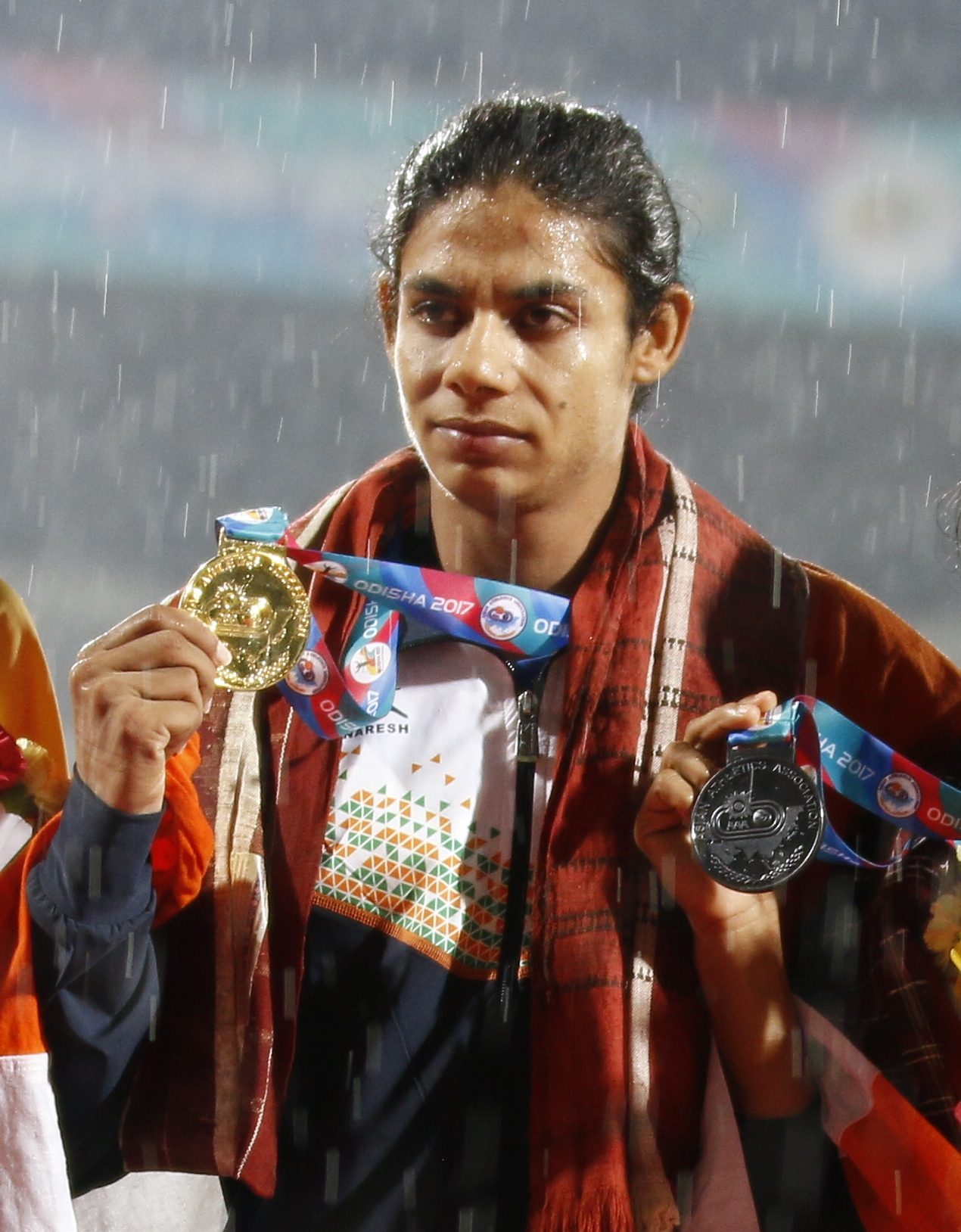
- Sheoran with a subsequently disqualified gold medal in 400m at the 2017 Asian Athletics Championships

Personal information
- Born: 15 July 1995 (age 31) Bhiwani district, Haryana, India

Sport
- Country: India
- Sport: Track and field
- Event: 400 metres

Achievements and titles
- Personal best: 400m: 51.48s (Hyderabad 2016)
Medal record
Women's athletics
Representing India
Asian Championships
Disqualified	2017 Bhubaneswar	400 m
Disqualified	2017 Bhubaneswar	4 x 400m Relay

Nirmala Sheoran (born 15 July 1995) is an Indian sprinter who specializes in the 400 metres event.

Sheoran is currently serving an eight-year competition ban due to failing anti-doping regulations with an end date of August 2031.

== Early life ==
Sheoran was born in Chehad Khurd village of Haryana's Bhiwani district.

== Career ==
Sheoran qualified for two events at the 2016 Summer Olympics: the women's 400 metres and the women's 4 × 400 metres relay.

Sheoran qualified for the women's 400 metres event at the Olympics by clocking 51.48 seconds, her personal best time, at the National Inter-State Senior Athletics championships in Hyderabad in July 2016. She finished well below the Olympics qualification mark of 52.20 seconds and also surpassed the previous best time at the meet of 51.73 seconds set by M. R. Poovamma in 2014. Sheoran's time in the heats of the same event was 52.35 seconds, while her previous personal best of 53.94 seconds was set in 2013 at Chennai.

Sheoran also qualified for the Olympics in the women's 4 × 400 metres relay event. The quartet of Sheoran, Poovamma, Tintu Lukka and Anilda Thomas clocked 3:27.88 at Bangalore in July 2016, finishing with the 12th best time in the world as top 16 relay teams qualified for the Olympics.

Although at the 2017 Asian Athletics Championships Sheoran was awarded the gold medal in both the 400m and 4 × 400 m races, she was subsequently disqualified and stripped of the medals in 2019 after being issued with an anti-doping ban.

== Doping bans ==
In 2019, Sheoran received a four-year competition ban for testing positive for drostanolone and metenolone along with irregulaties with her athlete biolological passport. In addition all her results from August 2016 to 2018 were voided including her medal winning efforts in 2017.

In February 2024, Sheoran received a second competition ban issued by the Indian National Anti-Doping Agency with an eight years duration after testing positive for anabolic androgenic steroids and testosterone.
