= Athletics at the 2018 Asian Games – Men's 1500 metres =

Asian game event

Men's 1500 metres at the 2018 Asian Games
- Venue: Gelora Bung Karno Stadium
- Date: 29–30 August 2018
- Competitors: 23 from 18 nations

Medalists
gold medal	Jinson Johnson	India
silver medal	Amir Moradi	Iran
bronze medal	Mohammed Tiouali	Bahrain

The men's 1500 metres competition at the 2018 Asian Games took place from 29 August 2018 until 30 August 2018 at the Gelora Bung Karno Stadium.

== Schedule ==
All times are Western Indonesia Time (UTC+07:00)

Date	Time	Event
Wednesday, 29 August 2018	19:20	Round 1
Thursday, 30 August 2018	19:35	Final

== Records ==
Prior to this competition, the existing world, Asian and Games records were as follows.

World Record	Hicham El-Guerrouj (MAR)	3:26.00	Rome, Italy	14 July 1998
Asian Record	Rashid Ramzi (BRN)	3:29.14	Rome, Italy	14 July 2006
Games Record	Mohammed Shaween (KSA)	3:36.49	Guangzhou, China	23 November 2010

== Results ==
Legend

- DNF — Did not finish

=== Round 1 ===
- Qualification: First 4 in each heat (Q) and the next 4 fastest (q) advance to the final.

==== Heat 1 ====
Rank	Athlete	Time	Notes
1	Manjit Singh (IND)	3:50.59	Q
2	Luo Yuxi (CHN)	3:50.69	Q
3	Sadik Mikhou (BRN)	3:50.75	Q
4	Ryoji Tatezawa (JPN)	3:50.75	Q
5	Musulman Dzholomanov (KGZ)	3:50.77	q
6	Musab Adam Ali (QAT)	3:50.90	q
7	Wahyudi Putra (INA)	3:51.14	
8	Saud Al-Zaabi (UAE)	3:52.22	
9	Dương Văn Thái (VIE)	3:54.50	
10	Yothin Yaprajan (THA)	4:01.41	
11	Manuel Ataide (TLS)	4:11.81	

==== Heat 2 ====
Rank	Athlete	Time	Notes
1	Mohammed Tiouali (BRN)	3:46.40	Q
2	Jinson Johnson (IND)	3:46.50	Q
3	Amir Moradi (IRI)	3:46.93	Q
4	Hamza Driouch (QAT)	3:47.18	Q
5	Adnan Taess (IRQ)	3:48.75	q
6	Oh Jae-won (KOR)	3:50.28	q
7	Gal-Erdeniin Odkhüü (MGL)	3:51.14	
8	Alexey Gussarov (KAZ)	3:52.43	
9	Bilal Bilano (INA)	3:55.76	
10	Wasim Abu-Thib (PLE)	3:58.01	
11	Roberto Belo (TLS)	4:07.92	
—	Mohammed Shaween (KSA)	DNF	

=== Final ===
Rank	Athlete	Time	Notes
1st place, gold medalist(s)	Jinson Johnson (IND)	3:44.72	
2nd place, silver medalist(s)	Amir Moradi (IRI)	3:45.62	
3rd place, bronze medalist(s)	Mohammed Tiouali (BRN)	3:45.88	
4	Manjit Singh (IND)	3:46.57	
5	Musab Adam Ali (QAT)	3:47.35	
6	Hamza Driouch (QAT)	3:47.84	
7	Adnan Taess (IRQ)	3:49.02	
8	Luo Yuxi (CHN)	3:49.36	
9	Ryoji Tatezawa (JPN)	3:49.40	
10	Musulman Dzholomanov (KGZ)	3:50.24	
11	Oh Jae-won (KOR)	4:01.97	
—	Sadik Mikhou (BRN)	DNF	
