= Alexey Gussarov =

Kazakhstani long-distance runner

Personal information
- Born: 18 February 1995 (age 30)

Sport
- Country: Kazakhstan
- Sport: Long-distance running

Alexey Gussarov (born 18 February 1995) is a Kazakhstani long-distance runner.

In 2017, he competed in the men's 800 metres and men's 1500 metres events at the 2017 Asian Athletics Championships held in Bhubaneswar, India.

In 2018, he competed in the men's half marathon at the 2018 IAAF World Half Marathon Championships held in Valencia, Spain. He finished in 129th place. In the same year, he also represented Kazakhstan at the 2018 Asian Games held in Jakarta, Indonesia. He competed in the men's 1500 metres event and he did not advance to compete in the final.
