= Amir Moradi =

Iranian middle-distance runner

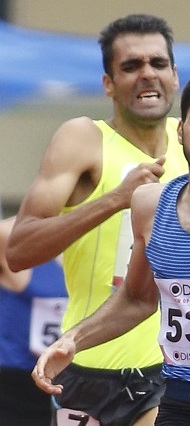
- Amir Moradi in 2017

Personal information
- Born: 10 April 1990 (age 36) Gandoman, Iran
- Height: 1.87 m (6 ft 2 in)
- Weight: 68 kg (150 lb)

Sport
- Sport: Athletics
- Event(s): 800 m, 1500 m
Medal record
Men's athletics
Representing Iran
Asian Indoor Championships
Gold medal – first place	2018 Tehran	1500 m

Amir Moradi (Persian: امیر مرادی; born 10 April 1990, in Gandoman) is an Iranian middle-distance runner who specialises in the 800 metres. He won a bronze medal at the 2017 Asian Indoor and Martial Arts Games.

His older brother, Sajjad Moradi, was also a runner.

== International competitions ==
Year	Competition	Venue	Position	Event	Notes
Representing Iran
2007	World Youth Championships	Ostrava, Czech Republic	17th (sf)	800 m	1:53.50
2008	Asian Indoor Championships	Doha, Qatar	5th (sf)	800 m	1:51.98
2008	Asian Junior Championships	Jakarta, Indonesia	2nd	800 m	1:52.62
2009	Asian Indoor Games	Hanoi, Vietnam	4th	800 m	1:51.28
2009	Asian Indoor Games	Hanoi, Vietnam	–	1500 m	DNF
2009	Asian Championships	Guangzhou, China	6th	800 m	1:50.57
2010	West Asian Championships	Aleppo, Syria	4th	800 m	1:47.38
2010	Asian Games	Guangzhou, China	4th (h)	800 m	1:47.98^{1}
2010	Asian Games	Guangzhou, China	–	4 × 400 m relay	DQ
2013	Asian Championships	Pune, India	5th	800 m	1:50.33
2013	Asian Championships	Pune, India	–	1500 m	DNF
2017	Asian Championships	Bhubaneswar, India	6th	800 m	1:50.66
2017	Asian Indoor and Martial Arts Games	Ashgabat, Turkmenistan	3rd	800 m	1:50.66
2018	Asian Indoor Championships	Tehran, Iran	4th	800 m	1:53.57
2018	Asian Indoor Championships	Tehran, Iran	1st	1500 m	3:53.78
2018	Asian Games	Jakarta, Indonesia	4th	800 m	1:46.55
2018	Asian Games	Jakarta, Indonesia	2nd	1500 m	3:45.62
2019	Asian Championships	Doha, Qatar	–	800 m	DNF
2019	Asian Championships	Doha, Qatar	6th	1500 m	3:44.75

^{1}Did not finish in the final

== Personal bests ==
Outdoor

- 800 metres – 1:46.55 (Jakarta 2018)
- 1500 metres – 3:46.89 (Ahwaz 2009)

Indoor

- 800 metres – 1:49.51 (Ashgabat 2017)
