= 2019 Asian Athletics Championships – Men's 1500 metres =

Men's 1500 metres at the 2019 Asian Athletics Championships
- Venue: Khalifa International Stadium
- Location: Doha, Qatar
- Dates: 21 April (heats); 22 April (final)
- Competitors: 25 from 17 nations
- Winning time: 3:42.85

Medalists
gold medal	Abubaker Haydar Abdalla	Bahrain
silver medal	Ajay Kumar Saroj	India
bronze medal	Adam Ali Mousab	Qatar

The men's 1500 metres at the 2019 Asian Athletics Championships was held on 23 and 24 April.

== Records ==
Records before the 2019 Asian Athletics Championships
Record	Athlete (nation)	Time (s)	Location	Date
World record	Hicham El Guerrouj (MAR)	3:26.00	Rome, Italy	14 July 1998
Asian record	Rashid Ramzi (BHR)	3:29.14	Rome, Italy	14 July 2006
Championship record	Kim Soon-Hyung (KOR)	3:38.60	Manila, Philippines	3 December 1993
World leading	Michael Saruni (KEN)	1:43.98	New York City, United States	9 February 2019
Asian leading	N/A			

== Results ==
=== Heats ===
Qualification rule: First 4 in each heat (Q) and the next 4 fastest (q) qualified for the final.

Rank	Heat	Name	Nationality	Time	Notes
1	2	Mohamed Ayoub Tiouali	Bahrain	3:49.14	Q
2	2	Ajay Kumar Saroj	India	3:49.20	Q
3	2	Muhand Khamis Saifeldin	Qatar	3:49.24	Q
4	2	Musulman Dzholomanov	Kyrgyzstan	3:49.29	Q, SB
5	2	Ryoji Tatezawa	Japan	3:49.31	q
6	2	Amir Moradi	Iran	3:49.43	q, SB
7	2	Adam Ali Mousab	Qatar	3:49.57	q
8	2	Awwad Al-Sharafa	Jordan	3:52.94	q, SB
9	2	Luo Yuxi	China	3:52.94	SB
10	2	Yothin Yaprajan	Thailand	3:55.49	
11	1	Abraham Kipchirchir Rotich	Bahrain	3:55.61	Q
12	1	Moslem Niadoost	Iran	3:55.93	Q
13	1	Kazuyoshi Tamogami	Japan	3:55.95	Q
14	1	Hemantha Kumara	Sri Lanka	3:56.69	Q
15	1	Hamza Driouch	Qatar	3:57.13	SB
16	1	Pei Haitao	China	3:57.31	
17	1	Jang Ho-june	South Korea	3:57.48	
18	1	Mikhail Soloshenko	Kyrgyzstan	3:59.46	SB
19	1	Husain Kamal	Kuwait	3:59.81	SB
20	1	Mohammed Al-Suleimani	Oman	4:01.70	SB
21	2	Hussain Riza	Maldives	4:06.26	SB
22	1	Dechen Ugyen	Bhutan	4:14.95	
23	1	Manuel Belo Amaral Ataide	Timor-Leste	4:18.34	SB
24	1	Hashed Al-Gobani	Yemen	4:28.42	
	2	Ebrahim Al-Zofairi	Kuwait	DNF	
	1	Sharif El-Atawneh	Jordan	DNS	
	1	Jinson Johnson	India	DNS	
	2	Wasim Abuthib	Palestine	DNS	
	2	Mohammed Shani	Yemen	DNS	

=== Final ===
Rank	Name	Nationality	Time	Notes
1st place, gold medalist(s)	Abraham Kipchirchir Rotich	Bahrain	3:42.85	SB
2nd place, silver medalist(s)	Ajay Kumar Saroj	India	3:43.18	SB
3rd place, bronze medalist(s)	Adam Ali Mousab	Qatar	3:43.18	SB
4	Mohamed Ayoub Tiouali	Bahrain	3:44.07	SB
5	Ryoji Tatezawa	Japan	3:44.70	
6	Amir Moradi	Iran	3:44.75	SB
7	Kazuyoshi Tamogami	Japan	3:45.15	
8	Muhand Khamis Saifeldin	Qatar	3:45.61	
9	Moslem Niadoost	Iran	3:46.25	
10	Musulman Dzholomanov	Kyrgyzstan	3:46.80	PB
11	Hemantha Kumara	Sri Lanka	3:49.28	
12	Awwad Al-Sharafa	Jordan	3:49.72	SB
