= 2019 Asian Athletics Championships – Men's 800 metres =

Men's 800 metres at the 2019 Asian Athletics Championships
- Venue: Khalifa International Stadium
- Location: Doha, Qatar
- Dates: 21 April (heats & semi-finals); 22 April (final)
- Competitors: 27 from 19 nations
- Winning time: 1:44.33

Medalists
gold medal	Abubaker Haydar Abdalla	Qatar
silver medal	Ebrahim Al-Zofairi	Kuwait
bronze medal	Jamal Hairane	Qatar

The men's 800 metres at the 2019 Asian Athletics Championships was held on 21 and 22 April.

== Records ==
Records before the 2019 Asian Athletics Championships
Record	Athlete (nation)	Time (s)	Location	Date
World record	David Rudisha (KEN)	1:40.91	London, United Kingdom	9 August 2012
Asian record	Yusuf Saad Kamel (BHR)	1:42.79	Fontvieille, Monaco	29 July 2008
Championship record	Majed Saeed Sultan (QAT)	1:44.27	Incheon, South Korea	4 September 2005
World leading	Michael Saruni (KEN)	1:43.98	New York City, United States	9 February 2019
Asian leading	Abubaker Haydar Abdalla (QAT)	1:45.60	San Diego, United States	5 April 2019

== Results ==
=== Heats ===
Qualification rule: First 3 in each heat (Q) and the next 4 fastest (q) qualified for the semifinals.

Rank	Heat	Name	Nationality	Time	Notes
1	3	Abubaker Haydar Abdalla	Qatar	1:50.12	Q
2	3	Alimujiang Rehemaiti	China	1:50.31	Q
3	3	Rusiru Chahutanga Gallage	Sri Lanka	1:50.55	Q
4	3	Jirayu Pleenaram	Thailand	1:51.35	q, PB
5	4	Abdirahman Saeed Hassan	Qatar	1:51.37	Q
6	3	Mohammed Al-Suleimani	Oman	1:51.45	q, PB
7	4	Abraham Kipchirchir Rotich	Bahrain	1:51.53	Q, SB
8	4	Li Junlin	China	1:51.60	Q
9	4	Som Bahadur Kumal	Nepal	1:52.04	q
10	4	Ali Fahimi	Iran	1:52.45	q
11	3	Marco Vilog	Philippines	1:52.78	
12	2	Mohammed Afsal	India	1:52.93	Q
13	1	Jamal Hairane	Qatar	1:53.31	Q
14	1	Jinson Johnson	India	1:53.43	Q
15	1	Ebrahim Al-Zofairi	Kuwait	1:53.59	Q
16	1	Musulman Dzholomanov	Kyrgyzstan	1:53.86	
17	4	Baiastan Maksatbekuulu	Kyrgyzstan	1:54.08	PB
18	1	Odilshoh Ismatov	Tajikistan	1:54.10	SB
19	2	Takumi Murashima	Japan	1:54.39	Q
20	2	Fawaz Farhan	Kuwait	1:54.41	Q
21	1	Awwad Al-Sharafa	Jordan	1:54.84	SB
22	1	Hussain Riza	Maldives	1:56.59	PB
23	2	Abdulah Al-Yaari	Yemen	1:57.07	SB
24	4	Manuel Belo Amaral Ataide	Timor-Leste	1:58.56	SB
25	3	Ahmed Ahmed	Palestine	2:03.55	SB
	2	Amir Moradi	Iran	DNF	
	2	Mohamed Ayoub Tiouali	Bahrain	DNF	
	2	Samer Al-Johar	Jordan	DNS	

=== Semi-finals ===
Qualification rule: First 3 in each heat (Q) and the next 2 fastest (q) qualified for the final.

Rank	Heat	Name	Nationality	Time	Notes
1	2	Abubaker Haydar Abdalla	Qatar	1:49.62	Q
2	1	Ebrahim Al-Zofairi	Kuwait	1:50.27	Q
3	1	Li Junlin	China	1:50.30	Q
4	1	Mohammed Afsal	India	1:50.47	Q
5	1	Abdirahman Saeed Hassan	Qatar	1:50.50	q
6	2	Jinson Johnson	India	1:50.65	Q
7	2	Jamal Hairane	Qatar	1:50.73	Q
8	1	Takumi Murashima	Japan	1:50.76	q
9	2	Rusiru Chahutanga Gallage	Sri Lanka	1:51.02	
10	2	Ali Fahimi	Iran	1:51.48	
11	2	Jirayu Pleenaram	Thailand	1:51.98	
12	1	Mohammed Al-Suleimani	Oman	1:52.21	
13	2	Fawaz Farhan	Kuwait	1:52.84	PB
14	1	Abraham Kipchirchir Rotich	Bahrain	1:53.07	
15	1	Som Bahadur Kumal	Nepal	1:53.22	
16	2	Alimujiang Rehemaiti	China	1:53.60	

=== Final ===
Rank	Name	Nationality	Time	Notes
1st place, gold medalist(s)	Abubaker Haydar Abdalla	Qatar	1:44.33	WL, PB
2nd place, silver medalist(s)	Ebrahim Al-Zofairi	Kuwait	1:46.88	SB
3rd place, bronze medalist(s)	Jamal Hairane	Qatar	1:47.27	
4	Abdirahman Saeed Hassan	Qatar	1:47.71	
5	Li Junlin	China	1:47.89	PB
6	Takumi Murashima	Japan	1:52.32	
7	Mohammed Afsal	India	1:54.68	
	Jinson Johnson	India	DNF	
