= 2017 Asian Athletics Championships – Men's 1500 metres =

The men's 1500 metres at the 2017 Asian Athletics Championships was held on 6 and 7 July.

== Medalists ==
Gold	Ajay Kumar Saroj; India
Silver	Jamal Hairane; Qatar
Bronze	Moslem Niadoost; Iran

== Results ==
=== Heats ===
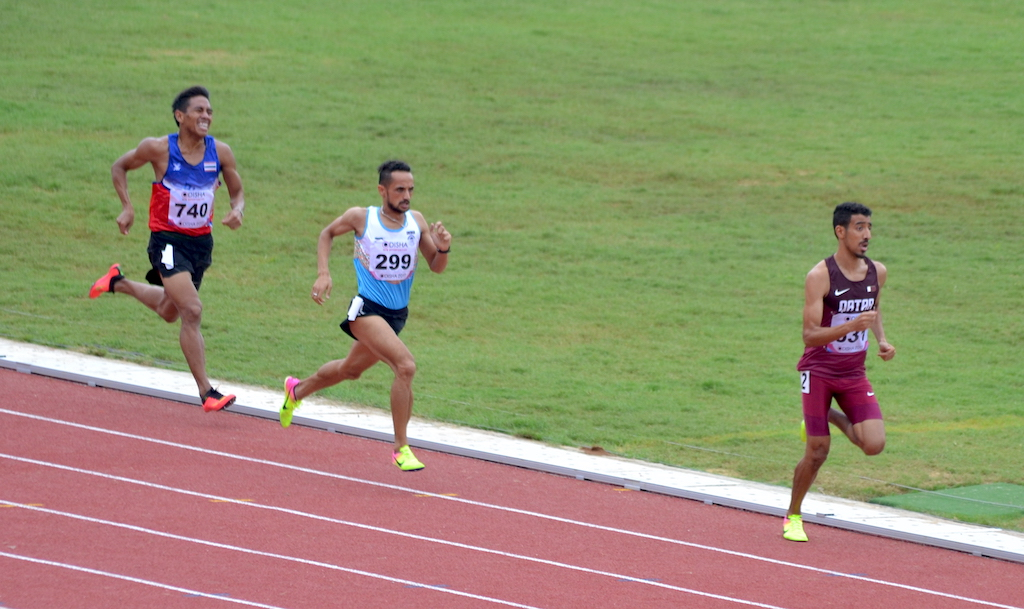
Heat 1

Qualification rule: First 5 in each heat (Q) and the next 2 fastest (q) qualified for the final.

Rank	Heat	Name	Nationality	Time	Notes
1	2	Ajay Kumar Saroj	India	3:51.37	Q
2	2	Moslem Niadoost	Iran	3:51.86	Q
3	2	Adnan Taes	Iraq	3:51.92	Q
4	2	Mohammed Shaween	Saudi Arabia	3:52.06	Q
5	2	Hiroya Inoue	Japan	3:52.61	Q
6	2	Alexey Gussarov	Kazakhstan	3:53.46	q
7	1	Jamal Hairane	Qatar	3:56.94	Q
8	1	Siddhanta Adhikari	India	3:57.46	Q
9	1	Yothin Yaprajan	Thailand	3:57.78	Q
10	1	Sharif Naim	Jordan	3:57.93	Q
11	1	Mohammed Rageh	Yemen	3:58.23	Q
12	2	Noor Aldeen Al-Humaidha	Yemen	4:00.44	q
13	1	Khaled El Denawi	Lebanon	4:01.76	
14	1	Mohammed Al-Bolooshi	United Arab Emirates	4:04.91	
15	2	Yu Hin Wa	Hong Kong	4:07.26	
16	1	Ahmed Hassan	Maldives	4:09.61	
17	2	Deus Felisberto	Timor-Leste	4:13.26	
18	1	Guhary Abdul Zaher	Afghanistan	4:19.67	
	2	Sufyan Hamdan	Palestine	DNS	

=== Final ===
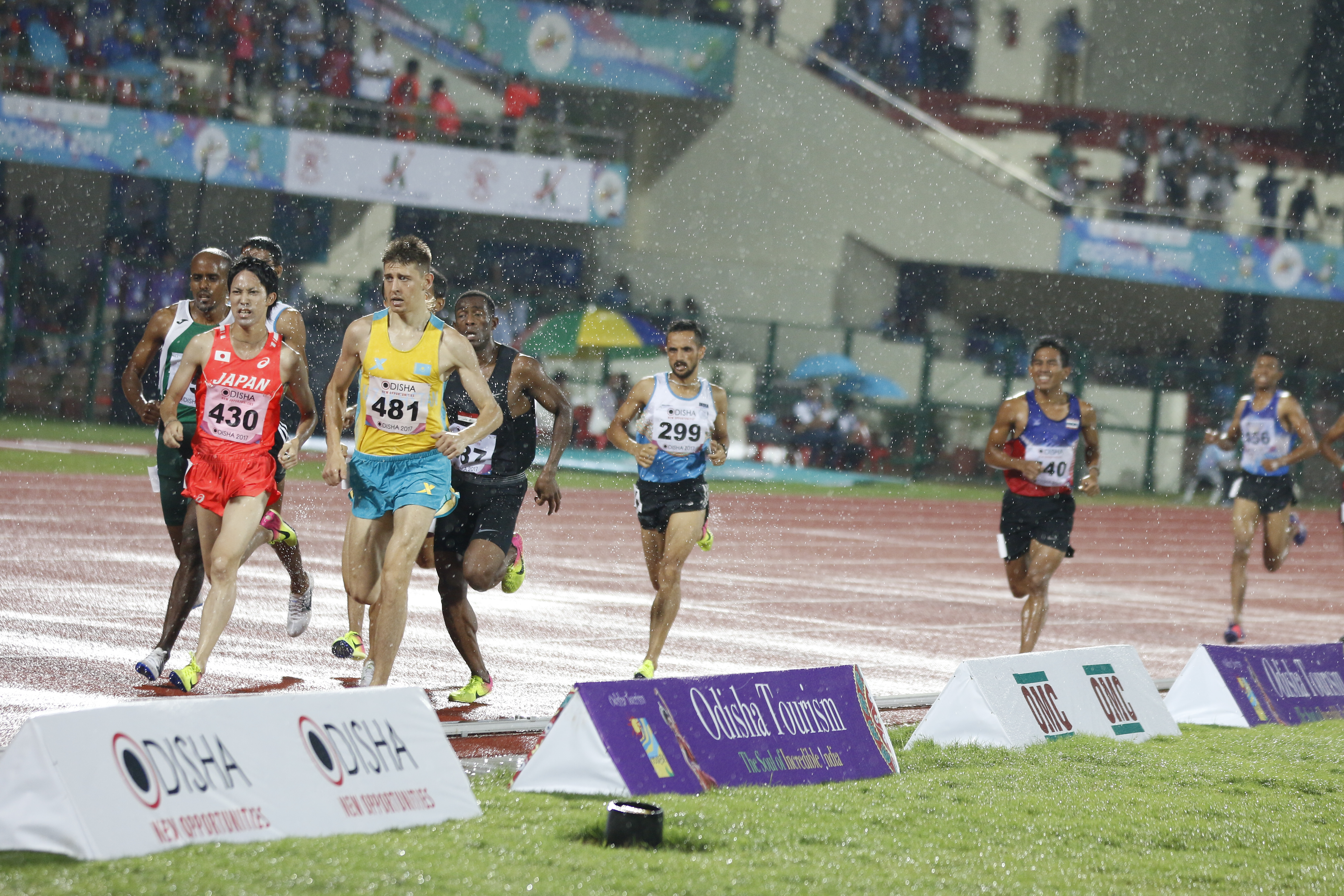
The final

Rank	Name	Nationality	Time	Notes
1st place, gold medalist(s)	Ajay Kumar Saroj	India	3:45.85	
2nd place, silver medalist(s)	Jamal Hairane	Qatar	3:46.90	
3rd place, bronze medalist(s)	Moslem Niadoost	Iran	3:48.53	
4	Adnan Taes	Iraq	3:49.03	
5	Siddhanta Adhikari	India	3:50.64	
6	Hiroya Inoue	Japan	3:51.16	
7	Mohammed Shaween	Saudi Arabia	3:51.42	
8	Alexey Gussarov	Kazakhstan	3:53.14	
9	Yothin Yaprajan	Thailand	3:55.61	
10	Mohammed Rageh	Yemen	3:58.95	
11	Sharif Naim	Jordan	3:59.09	
12	Noor Aldeen Al-Humaidha	Yemen	4:01.60	
