= Athletics at the 2022 Asian Games – Men's 1500 metres =

Men's 1500 metres at the 2022 Asian Games
- Venue: Hangzhou Olympic Expo Main Stadium
- Date: 30 September – 1 October 2023
- Competitors: 21 from 15 nations

Medalists
| gold medal | Mohamad Al-Garni | Qatar |
| silver medal | Ajay Kumar Saroj | India |
| bronze medal | Jinson Johnson | India |

The men's 1500 metres competition at the 2022 Asian Games took place on 30 September and 1 October 2023 at the HOC Stadium, Hangzhou.

== Schedule ==
All times are China Standard Time (UTC+08:00)

| Date | Time | Event |
|---|---|---|
| Saturday, 30 September 2023 | 09:35 | Round 1 |
| Sunday, 1 October 2023 | 20:30 | Final |

== Records ==
Prior to this competition, the existing world, Asian and Games records were as follows.

| World Record | Hicham El-Guerrouj (MAR) | 3:26.00 | Rome, Italy | 14 July 1998 |
| Asian Record | Rashid Ramzi (BRN) | 3:29.14 | Rome, Italy | 14 July 2006 |
| Games Record | Mohammed Shaween (KSA) | 3:36.49 | Guangzhou, China | 23 November 2010 |

== Results ==
=== Round 1 ===
- Qualification: First 6 in each heat (Q) advance to the final.

==== Heat 1 ====
| Rank | Athlete | Time | Notes |
|---|---|---|---|
| 1 | Raed Al-Jadani (KSA) | 3:51.80 | Q |
| 2 | Ajay Kumar Saroj (IND) | 3:51.93 | Q |
| 3 | Abdirahman Saeed Hassan (QAT) | 3:52.08 | Q |
| 4 | Liu Dezhu (CHN) | 3:53.57 | Q |
| 5 | Lương Đức Phước (VIE) | 3:53.97 | Q |
| 6 | Kazuki Kawamura (JPN) | 3:54.11 | Q |
| 7 | Odbayaryn Boldoo (MGL) | 3:55.38 | |
| 8 | Felisberto de Deus (TLS) | 3:57.66 | |
| 9 | Waqas Akbar (PAK) | 3:58.10 | |
| 10 | Hussain Fazeel Haroon (MDV) | 4:00.63 | |
| 11 | Sorn Pisey (CAM) | 4:25.38 | |

==== Heat 2 ====
| Rank | Athlete | Time | Notes |
|---|---|---|---|
| 1 | Park Jong-hak (KOR) | 3:55.97 | Q |
| 2 | Mohamad Al-Garni (QAT) | 3:56.02 | Q |
| 3 | Zouhair Aouad (BRN) | 3:56.15 | Q |
| 4 | Fayez Al-Subaie (KSA) | 3:56.20 | Q |
| 5 | Jinson Johnson (IND) | 3:56.22 | Q |
| 6 | Musulman Dzholomanov (KGZ) | 3:56.85 | Q |
| 7 | Narandulamyn Mönkhbayar (MGL) | 3:58.26 | |
| 8 | Sohail Amir (PAK) | 3:58.70 | |
| 9 | Chhun Bunthorn (CAM) | 3:59.97 | |
| 10 | Tamer Qaoud (PLE) | 4:01.47 | |

=== Final ===
| Rank | Athlete | Time | Notes |
|---|---|---|---|
| 1st place, gold medalist(s) | Mohamad Al-Garni (QAT) | 3:38.36 | |
| 2nd place, silver medalist(s) | Ajay Kumar Saroj (IND) | 3:38.94 | |
| 3rd place, bronze medalist(s) | Jinson Johnson (IND) | 3:39.74 | |
| 4 | Abdirahman Saeed Hassan (QAT) | 3:40.55 | |
| 5 | Zouhair Aouad (BRN) | 3:40.69 | |
| 6 | Liu Dezhu (CHN) | 3:41.73 | |
| 7 | Fayez Al-Subaie (KSA) | 3:42.14 | |
| 8 | Raed Al-Jadani (KSA) | 3:42.53 | |
| 9 | Kazuki Kawamura (JPN) | 3:44.71 | |
| 10 | Park Jong-hak (KOR) | 3:46.25 | |
| 11 | Lương Đức Phước (VIE) | 3:51.65 | |
| 12 | Musulman Dzholomanov (KGZ) | 3:52.37 | |
