= 2017 Asian Athletics Championships – Men's 800 metres =

The men's 800 metres at the 2017 Asian Athletics Championships was held on 8 and 9 July.

== Medalists ==
Gold	Ebrahim Al-Zofairi; Kuwait
Silver	Jamal Hairane; Qatar
Bronze	Jinson Johnson; India

== Results ==
=== Heats ===
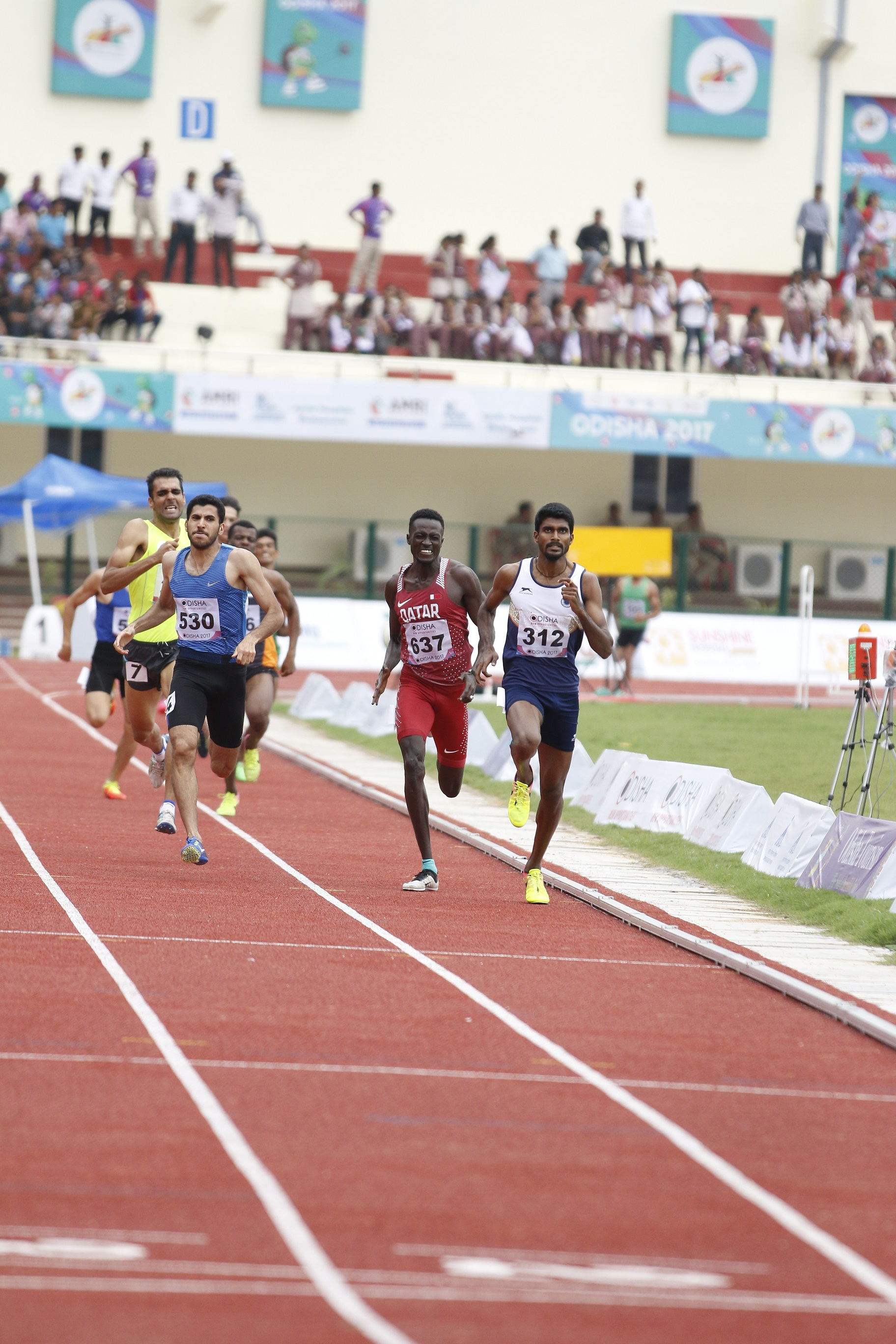
Heat 1

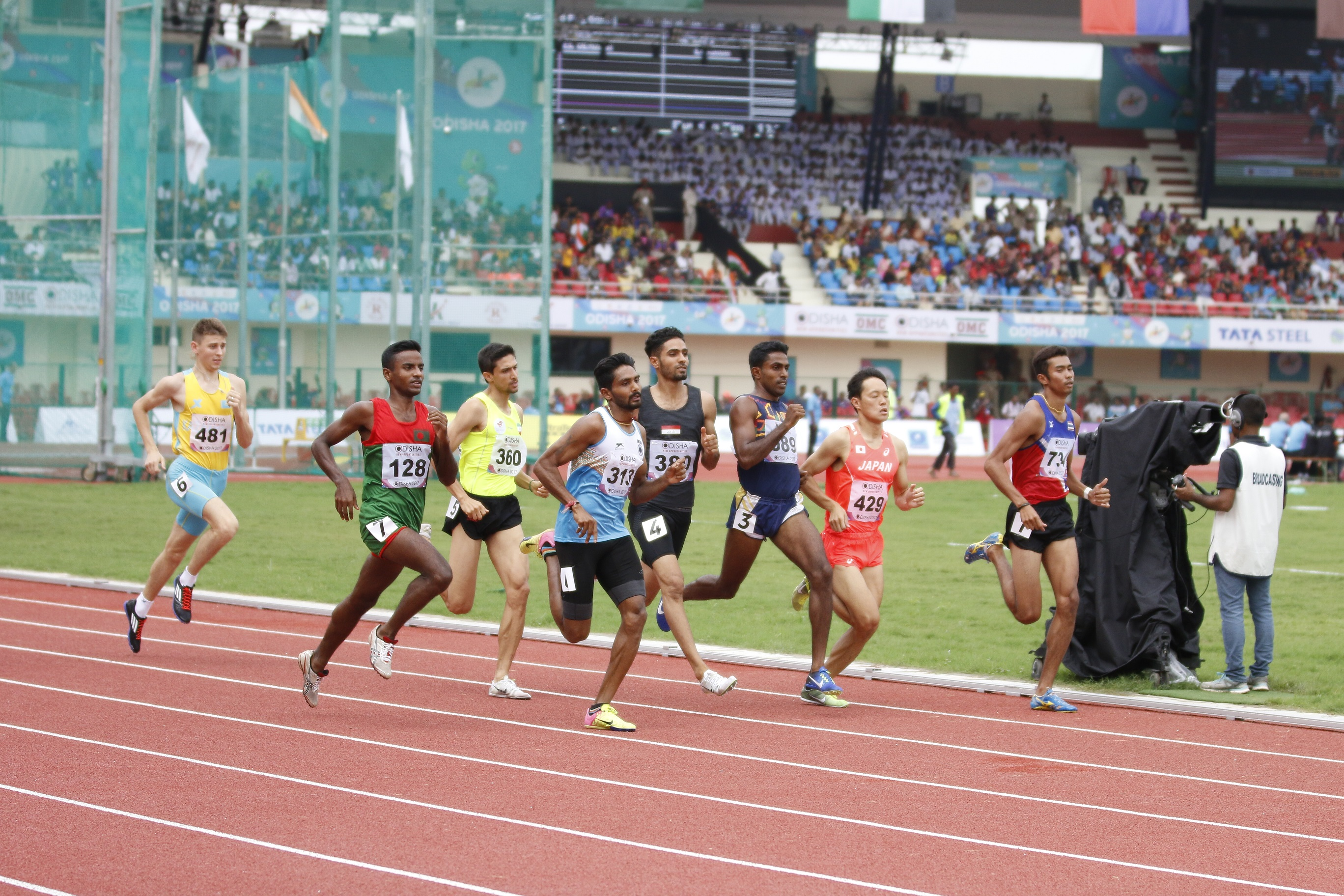
Heat 3

Qualification rule: First 2 in each heat (Q) and the next 3 fastest (q) qualified for the final.

Rank	Heat	Name	Nationality	Time	Notes
1	2	Sho Kawamoto	Japan	1:50.11	Q
2	2	Jamal Hairane	Qatar	1:50.32	Q
3	1	Jinson Johnson	India	1:50.48	Q
4	2	Ma Junyi	China	1:50.54	q
5	1	Mohamed Nasir Abbas	Qatar	1:50.65	Q
6	1	Ebrahim Al-Zofairi	Kuwait	1:50.76	q
7	1	Amir Moradi	Iran	1:51.23	q
8	3	Vishwambhar Kolekar	India	1:51.62	Q
9	3	Indunil Madushan Herath	Sri Lanka	1:51.70	Q
10	3	Ihab Jabbar Hashi Hashim	Iraq	1:51.75	
11	2	Hassan Mayouf	United Arab Emirates	1:51.78	PB
12	2	Odilshokh Ismatov	Tajikistan	1:51.89	
13	3	Moslem Niadoost	Iran	1:52.33	
14	3	Taichi Ichino	Japan	1:52.36	
15	2	Kumal Som Bahadur	Nepal	1:52.56	
16	1	Musulman Dzholomanov	Kyrgyzstan	1:52.93	
17	1	Saud Al-Zaabi	United Arab Emirates	1:52.97	
18	2	Hung Yu-chao	Chinese Taipei	1:53.31	
19	2	Muhammad Hafis	Indonesia	1:53.56	
20	2	Mohamad Hannouf	Lebanon	1:53.61	
21	3	Jirayu Pleenaram	Thailand	1:54.09	
22	1	Mustafa Attwan	Iraq	1:54.33	
23	1	Khondokar Kibria	Bangladesh	1:54.66	
24	1	Ahmed Al-Yaari	Yemen	1:55.86	
25	3	Alexey Gussarov	Kazakhstan	1:56.26	
26	3	Kamrul Hasan	Bangladesh	1:56.42	
27	3	Khaled El Denawi	Lebanon	1:57.86	
28	1	Ahmed Hassan	Maldives	1:58.01	
29	2	Wais Ibrahim Khairandesh	Afghanistan	1:58.75	
30	1	Sadat Khoshal	Afghanistan	2:05.41	
31	3	Antonio Lopes	Timor-Leste	2:09.87	

=== Final ===
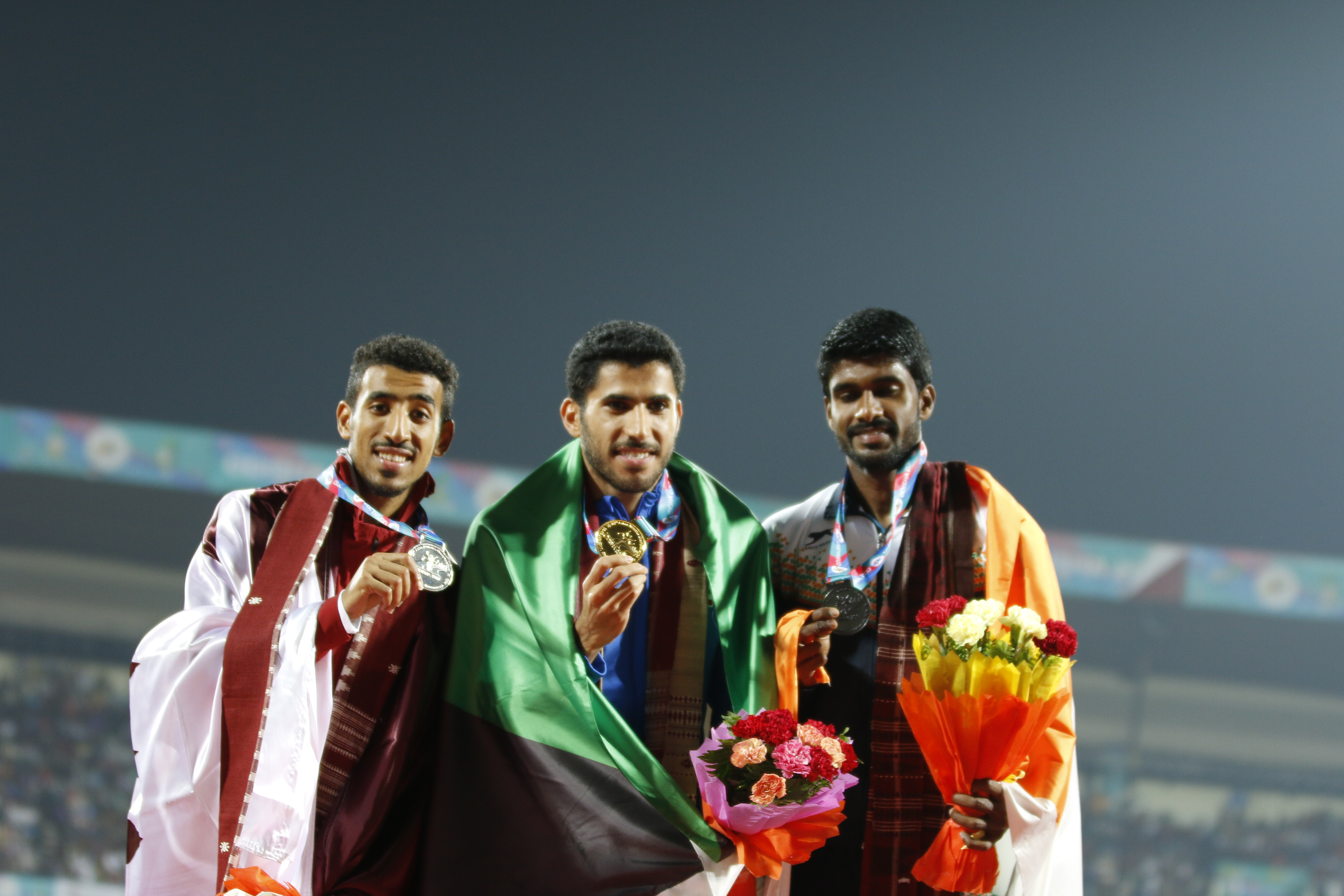
Ebrahim Al-Zofairi of Kuwait (Gold), Jamal Hairane of Qatar (Silver), and Jinson Johnson of India (Bronze)

Rank	Name	Nationality	Time	Notes
1st place, gold medalist(s)	Ebrahim Al-Zofairi	Kuwait	1:49.47	
2nd place, silver medalist(s)	Jamal Hairane	Qatar	1:49.94	
3rd place, bronze medalist(s)	Jinson Johnson	India	1:50.07	
4	Mohamed Nasir Abbas	Qatar	1:50.16	
5	Indunil Madushan Herath	Sri Lanka	1:50.57	
6	Amir Moradi	Iran	1:50.66	
7	Ma Junyi	China	1:50.98	
8	Vishwambhar Kolekar	India	1:51.07	
9	Sho Kawamoto	Japan	1:52.62	
