= Mohammed Rageh =

Yemeni middle-distance runner

Personal information
- Nationality: Yemeni
- Born: January 1, 1998 (age 28)
- Height: 1.69 m (5 ft 6 1/2 in)
- Weight: 64 kg (141 lb)

Sport
- Sport: Track and field
- Event: 1500 metres

Achievements and titles
- Personal best: 1500 m: 3:58.91 min (2016)

Mohammed Rageh (born 1 January 1998) is a Yemeni middle-distance runner who competes in the 1500 metres. He represented his country at the 2016 Summer Olympics, competing in the heats only.

As a young athlete, he won a steeplechase bronze at the 2013 Asian Youth Games and participated in the junior race at the 2015 IAAF World Cross Country Championships.

== International competitions ==
| Year | Competition | Venue | Position | Event | Notes |
|---|---|---|---|---|---|
| 2013 | Asian Youth Games | Nanjing, China | 3rd | 2000 m s'chase | 6:18.38 |
| 2015 | World Cross Country Championships | Guiyang, China | 98th | Junior race | 27:52 |
| 2016 | Olympic Games | Rio de Janeiro, Brazil | 36th (h) | 1500 m | 3:58.99 |
| 2017 | Asian Championships | Bhubaneswar, India | 10th | 1500 m | 3:58.95 |
| 2017 | Asian Championships | Bhubaneswar, India | 6th | 10,000 m | 32:08.71 |
