= 2015 Asian Athletics Championships – Men's 1500 metres =

The men's 1500 metres event at the 2015 Asian Athletics Championships was held on the 3 of June.

== Results ==
Rank	Name	Nationality	Result	Notes
1st place, gold medalist(s)	Mohamad Al-Garni	Qatar	3:41.42	
2nd place, silver medalist(s)	Mohammed Tiouali	Bahrain	3:42.43	
3rd place, bronze medalist(s)	Belal Mansoor Ali	Bahrain	3:43.67	
4	Daiki Hirose	Japan	3:43.86	
5	Li Lei	China	3:45.60	
6	Moslem Niadoost	Iran	3:46.41	
7	Wesam Al-Massri	Palestine	3:47.97	
8	Masaki Toda	Japan	3:49.56	
9	Abdullah Obaid Al-Salhi	Saudi Arabia	3:50.00	
10	Chinthaka Sanjeewa	Sri Lanka	3:52.68	
11	Le Hoai Phuong	Vietnam	4:09.52	
12	Ahmed Hassan	Maldives	4:11.37	
13	Augusto Soares	Timor-Leste	4:13.73	
14	Tenzin Thinley	Bhutan	4:24.57	
	Akhyt Asyeikhan	Mongolia	DNS	
	Abdullaziz Al-Abdi	Yemen	DNS	
