= Jamal Hairane =

Qatari middle-distance runner

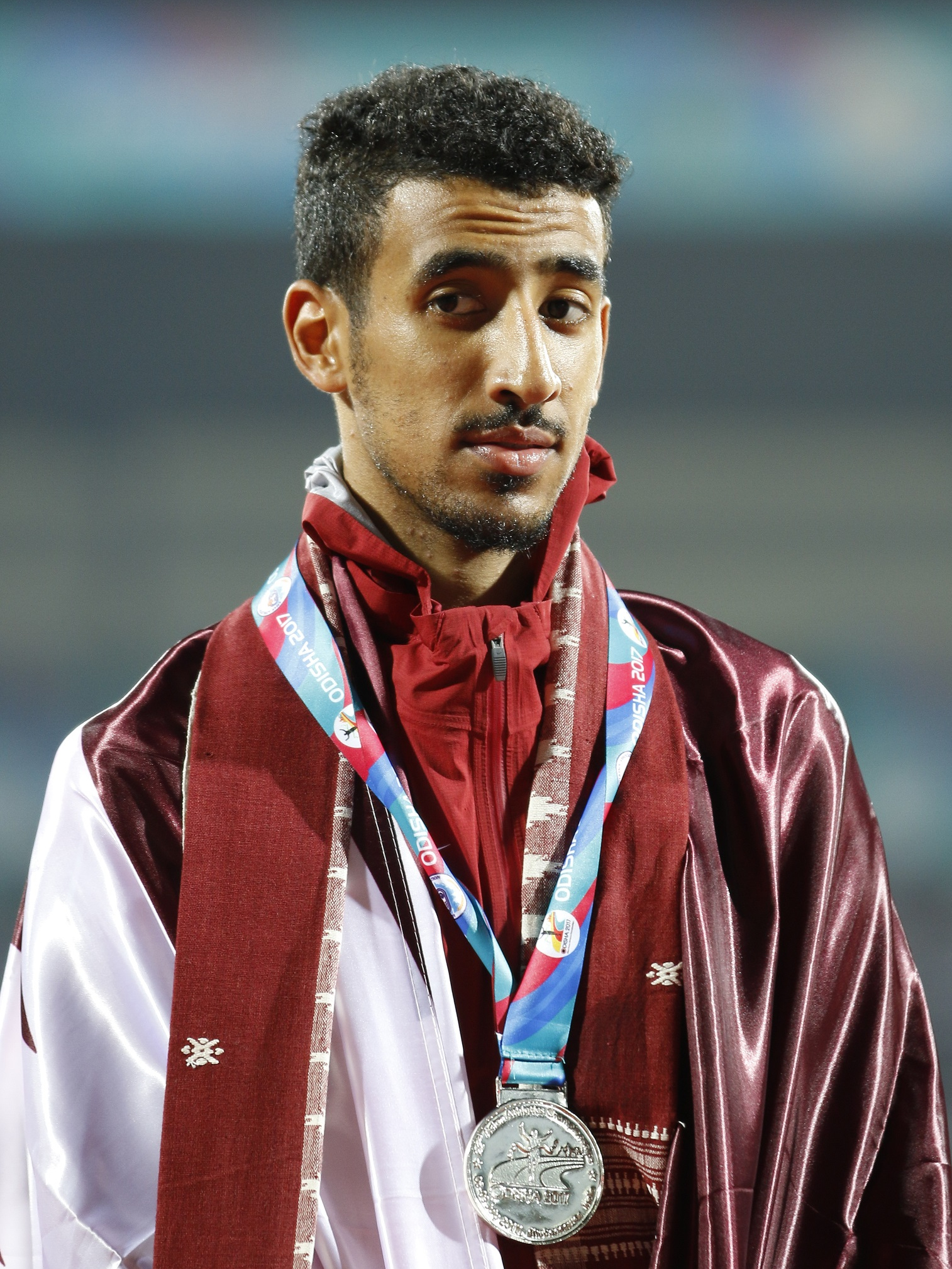

Personal information
- Born: 26 May 1993 (age 33) Morocco

Sport
- Sport: Athletics
- Event: 800 metres
Medal record
Men's athletics
Representing Qatar
Asian Indoor Championships
| Silver medal – second place | 2016 Doha | 800 m |

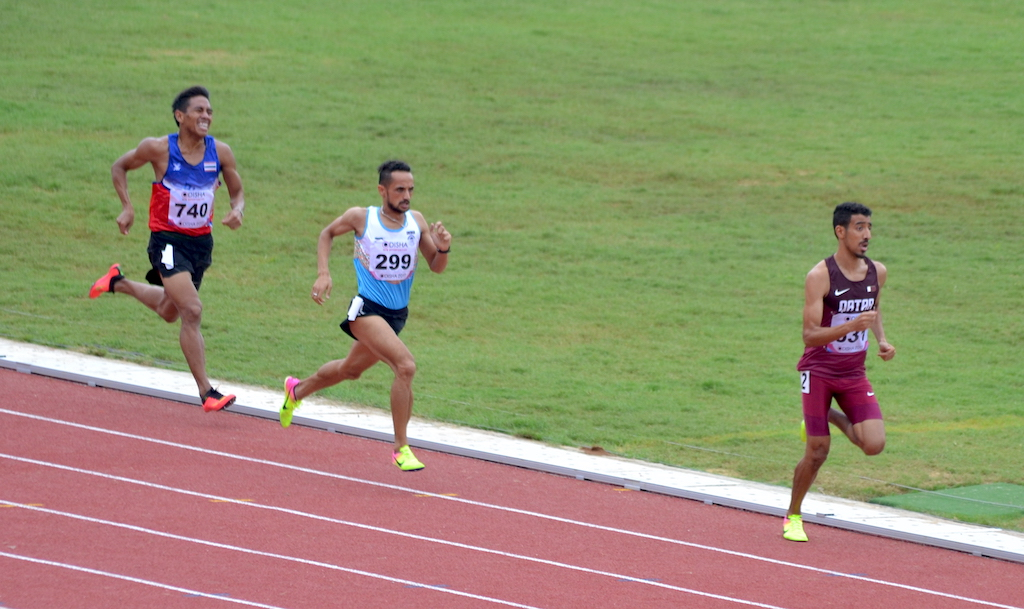
Jamal Hairane Wins the Men's 1500m First Round Race Ahead Of India's Siddhantha Adikari And Thailand's Yothin Yaprajan

Jamal Hairane (born 26 May 1993) is a Moroccan-born Qatari athlete specialising in the 800 metres events. He won the Bronze medal at the 2014 Asian Games.

His personal bests in the event are 1:46.16 outdoors (Leuven 2015) and 1:48.05 indoors (Doha 2015). He is also known as Jamal Al-Hayrani.

== Competition record ==
| Year | Competition | Venue | Position | Event | Notes |
Representing Qatar
| 2011 | Pan Arab Games | Doha, Qatar | 10th (h) | 800 m | 1:54.19 |
| 2012 | Asian Junior Championships | Colombo, Sri Lanka | 3rd | 1500 m | 3:48.11 |
| 2012 | World Junior Championships | Barcelona, Spain | 12th (sf) | 800 m | 1:49.89 |
| 2013 | Arab Championships | Doha, Qatar | 6th | 800 m | 1:50.27 |
| 2013 | Arab Championships | Doha, Qatar | 2nd | 4 × 400 m relay | 3:09.55 |
| 2013 | Asian Championships | Pune, India | 12th (h) | 800 m | 1:54.88 |
| 2014 | Asian Games | Incheon, South Korea | 3rd | 800 m | 1:48.25 |
| 2015 | Asian Championships | Wuhan, China | 7th | 800 m | 1:53.76 |
| 2015 | World Championships | Beijing, China | 37th (h) | 800 m | 1:48.96 |
| 2016 | Asian Indoor Championships | Doha, Qatar | 2nd | 800 m | 1:48.05 |
| 2017 | IAAF World Relays | Nassau, Bahamas | 6th | 4 × 800 m relay | 7:28.25 |
| 2017 | Asian Championships | Bhubaneswar, India | 2nd | 800 m | 1:49.94 |
| 2017 | Asian Championships | Bhubaneswar, India | 2nd | 1500 m | 3:46.90 |
| 2017 | Asian Indoor and Martial Arts Games | Ashgabat, Turkmenistan | 1st | 800 m | 1:49.33 |
| 2017 | Asian Indoor and Martial Arts Games | Ashgabat, Turkmenistan | – | 1500 m | DQ |
| 2017 | Asian Indoor and Martial Arts Games | Ashgabat, Turkmenistan | 2nd | 4 × 400 m relay | 3:12.58 |
| 2018 | Asian Games | Jakarta, Indonesia | 6th | 800 m | 1:49.05 |
| 2019 | Asian Championships | Doha, Qatar | 3rd | 800 m | 1:47.27 |
| 2019 | World Championships | Doha, Qatar | 24th (h) | 800 m | 1:46.40 |
