= Saud Al-Zaabi =

Emirati middle-distance runner

Personal information
- Full name: Saud Juma Al-Zaabi
- Born: 7 August 1988 (age 37)
- Height: 1.75 m (5 ft 9 in)
- Weight: 77 kg (170 lb)

Sport
- Sport: Athletics
- Events: 800 m, 1500 m
- Coached by: Othmane El Chaibi

Saud Juma Al-Zaabi (Arabic: سعود الزاب; born 7 August 1988) is an Emirati middle-distance runner. He competed at the 2016 Summer Olympics and the 2017 World Championships without advancing from the first round. He never competed at a major international competition before the Rio Olympics.

== International competitions ==
Year	Competition	Venue	Position	Event	Notes
Representing United Arab Emirates
2016	Olympic Games	Rio de Janeiro, Brazil	38th (h)	1500 m	4:02.35
2017	Islamic Solidarity Games	Baku, Azerbaijan	9th (h)	800 m	1:52.34
2017	Islamic Solidarity Games	Baku, Azerbaijan	10th	1500 m	3:58.95
2017	Asian Championships	Bhubaneswar, India	17th (h)	800 m	1:52.97
2017	Arab Championships	Radès, Tunisia	10th	800 m	1:54.00
2017	World Championships	London, United Kingdom	43rd (h)	800 m	1:53.34
2017	Asian Indoor and Martial Arts Games	Ashgabat, Turkmenistan	7th	1500 m	3:59.32
2018	Asian Games	Jakarta, Indonesia	16th (h)	800 m	1:50.94
