= Chakkittapara =

- town
- Location in Kerala, India Chakkittapara (India)
- Coordinates: 11.57°N 75.81°E
- Country: India
- State: Kerala
- District: Kozhikode

Population (2006)
  - Total: 63,795

Languages
  - Official: Malayalam, English
- Time zone: UTC+5:30 (IST)
- PIN: 673 526
- Telephone code: +91 496
- Vehicle registration: KL-77
- Website: www.kozhikode.nic.in

Chakkittapara is a panchayat in the Kozhikode district of Kerala state, India.

== Notable people ==
- Jinson Johnson-Indian Middle Distance Runner, Olympian
