= Athletics at the 2018 Asian Games – Men's 800 metres =

Men's 800 metres at the 2018 Asian Games
- Venue: Gelora Bung Karno Stadium
- Date: 27–28 August 2018
- Competitors: 27 from 20 nations

Medalists
gold medal	Manjit Singh	India
silver medal	Jinson Johnson	India
bronze medal	Abubaker Haydar Abdalla	Qatar

The men's 800 metres competition at the 2018 Asian Games took place on 27 and 28 August 2018 at the Gelora Bung Karno Stadium, Jakarta, Indonesia.

== Schedule ==
All times are Western Indonesia Time (UTC+07:00)

Date	Time	Event
Monday, 27 August 2018	20:05	Round 1
Tuesday, 28 August 2018	19:40	Final

== Records ==
Prior to this competition, the existing world, Asian and Games records were as follows.

World Record	David Rudisha (KEN)	1:40.91	London, United Kingdom	9 August 2012
Asian Record	Yusuf Saad Kamel (BRN)	1:42.79	Monaco	29 July 2008
Games Record	Sajjad Moradi (IRI)	1:45.45	Guangzhou, China	25 November 2010

== Results ==
Legend

- DNF — Did not finish

=== Round 1 ===
- Qualification: First 2 in each heat (Q) and the next 2 fastest (q) advance to the final.

==== Heat 1 ====
Rank	Athlete	Time	Notes
1	Jinson Johnson (IND)	1:47.39	Q
2	Jamal Hairane (QAT)	1:47.45	Q
3	Indunil Herath (SRI)	1:47.54	q
4	Sho Kawamoto (JPN)	1:48.07	q
5	Li Junlin (CHN)	1:48.74	
6	Dương Văn Thái (VIE)	1:49.79	
7	Marco Vilog (PHI)	1:50.75	
8	Odilshoh Ismatov (TJK)	1:51.80	
9	Asyeikhany Akhyt (MGL)	1:53.89	

==== Heat 2 ====
Rank	Athlete	Time	Notes
1	Abraham Rotich (BRN)	1:48.24	Q
2	Amir Moradi (IRI)	1:48.31	Q
3	Takumi Murashima (JPN)	1:48.86	
4	Musulman Dzholomanov (KGZ)	1:50.28	
5	Saud Al-Zaabi (UAE)	1:50.94	
6	Wempy Pelamonia (INA)	1:54.53	
7	Gal-Erdenegiin Odkhüü (MGL)	1:55.07	
8	Oh Jae-won (KOR)	1:59.58	
9	Manuel Ataide (TLS)	2:02.40	

==== Heat 3 ====
Rank	Athlete	Time	Notes
1	Abubaker Haydar Abdalla (QAT)	1:48.25	Q
2	Manjit Singh (IND)	1:48.64	Q
3	Ihab Jabbar (IRQ)	1:48.87	
4	Som Bahadur Kumal (NEP)	1:50.25	
5	Khurshidjon Akhmadaliev (UZB)	1:51.49	
6	Mayouf Hassan (UAE)	1:52.02	
7	Budiman Holle (INA)	1:52.38	
8	Yothin Yaprajan (THA)	1:53.71	
—	Sadik Mikhou (BRN)	DNF	

=== Final ===
Rank	Athlete	Time	Notes
1st place, gold medalist(s)	Manjit Singh (IND)	1:46.15	
2nd place, silver medalist(s)	Jinson Johnson (IND)	1:46.35	
3rd place, bronze medalist(s)	Abubaker Haydar Abdalla (QAT)	1:46.38	
4	Amir Moradi (IRI)	1:46.55	
5	Abraham Rotich (BRN)	1:47.05	
6	Jamal Hairane (QAT)	1:49.05	
7	Sho Kawamoto (JPN)	1:50.87	
8	Indunil Herath (SRI)	1:51.36	
