= Musulman Dzholomanov =

Kyrgyzstani middle-distance runner

Personal information
- Born: 21 June 1997 (age 29)

Sport
- Country: Kyrgyzstan
- Sport: Track and field
- Event: Middle-distance running

Musulman Dzholomanov (born 21 June 1997) is a Kyrgyzstani middle-distance runner. In 2019, he competed in the men's 1500 metres at the 2019 World Athletics Championships held in Doha, Qatar. He finished in 38th place in the heats.

In 2017, he competed in the men's 800 metres event at the Asian Athletics Championships held in Bhubaneswar, India. In the same year, he represented Kyrgyzstan at the 2017 Summer Universiade held in Taipei, Taiwan in the men's 1500 metres event. He did not qualify to compete in the final. In 2018, he represented Kyrgyzstan at the 2018 Asian Games held in Jakarta, Indonesia. He competed in the men's 800 metres and men's 1500 metres events.

In 2019, he competed in the men's 800 metres and men's 1500 metres events at the 2019 Asian Athletics Championships held in Doha, Qatar. In the 800 metres event he did not advance to compete in the final and in the 1500 metres event he finished in 10th place in the final.
