= Ajay Kumar Saroj =

Indian middle-distance runner (born 1997)

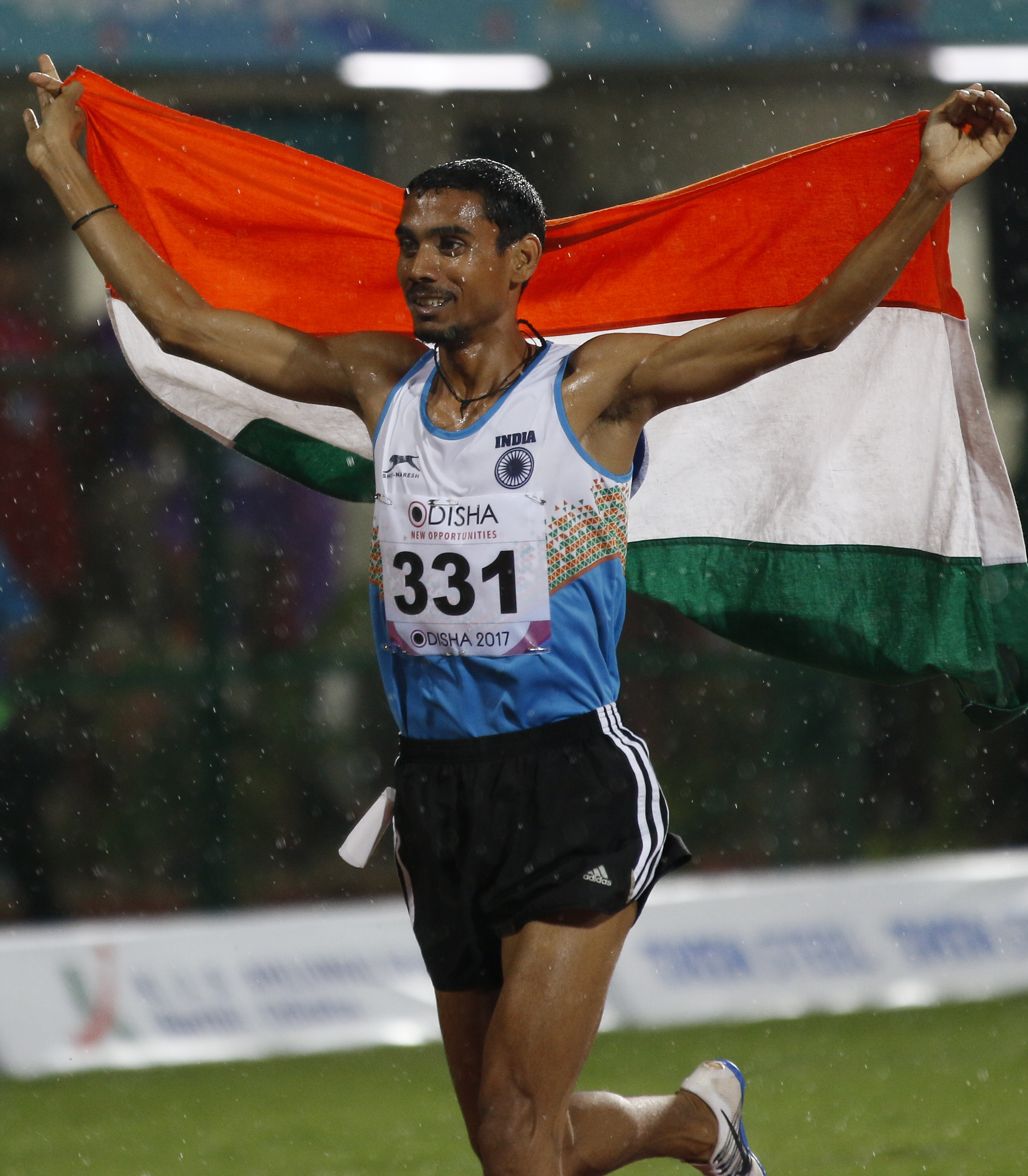
- Saroj at the 2017 Asian Championships

Personal information
- Born: 1 May 1997 (age 29) Allahabad, Uttar Pradesh, India

Sport
- Sport: Track and field
- Events: 800 m, 1500 m

Achievements and titles
- Personal bests: 800 m: 1:49.05 (2017); 1500 m: 3:37.83 (2024)
Medal record
Men's athletics
Representing India
Asian Games
Silver medal – second place	2022 Hangzhou	1500m
Asian Championships
Gold medal – first place	2017 Bhubaneswar	1500m
Gold medal – first place	2023 Bangkok	1500m
Silver medal – second place	2019 Doha	1500m
Asian Indoor Games
Gold medal – first place	2017 Ashgabat	1500m
South Asian Games
Gold medal – first place	2016 Guwahati	1500m
Gold medal – first place	2019 Kathmandu	1500m
Bronze medal – third place	2016 Guwahati	800m
Asian Youth Games
Bronze medal – third place	2013 Nanjing	1500m

Ajay Kumar Saroj (born 1 May 1997) is an Indian middle-distance runner.

== Early life ==
Ajay Kumar Saroj hails from Allahabad, Uttar Pradesh. Saroj is the youngest of three brothers, and has three sisters. His father is a farmer and his mother is a housewife. He took up athletics at age 15.

== Career ==
Noticing his lack of interest in academics, his family encouraged him to take up sport at a young age. An avid learner, he used to watch the Olympic Games on television to learn the nuances of athletics. Beginning his career on track with 400m, Saroj, on the suggestion of his coach, shifted his focus to 1500m & 800m.

He is currently supported by the GoSports Foundation through the GoSports Long Term Athlete Development Programme.
