= Moslem Niadoost =

Iranian middle-distance runner

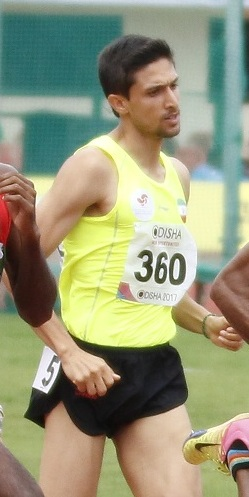
- Moslem Niadoost in 2017

Personal information
- Born: 25 July 1990 (age 35)
- Height: 1.77 m (5 ft 10 in)
- Weight: 64 kg (141 lb)

Sport
- Sport: Athletics
- Event(s): 800 m, 1500 m

Moslem Niadoost (Persian: مسلم نیادوست; born 25 July 1990) is an Iranian middle-distance runner. He won a bronze medal in the 1500 metres at the 2017 Asian Championships.

== International competitions ==
Year	Competition	Venue	Position	Event	Notes
Representing Iran
2011	Asian Championships	Kobe, Japan	8th	800 m	3:50.79
2011	Universiade	Shenzhen, China	29th (h)	800 m	1:52.08
2011	Universiade	Shenzhen, China	10th (h)	1500 m	3:48.93
2015	Asian Championships	Wuhan, China	6th	1500 m	3:46.41
2017	Asian Championships	Bhubaneswar, India	13th (h)	800 m	1:52.33
2017	Asian Championships	Bhubaneswar, India	3rd	1500 m	3:48.53
2017	Asian Indoor and Martial Arts Games	Ashgabat, Turkmenistan	6th	1500 m	3:58.65
2018	Asian Indoor Championships	Tehran, Iran	–	1500 m	DQ
2019	Asian Championships	Doha, Qatar	9th	1500 m	3:46.25
2019	Asian Championships	Doha, Qatar	9th	3000 m s'chase	8:58.95

== Personal bests ==
Outdoor

- 800 metres – 1:50.03 (Tehran 2013)
- 1500 metres – 3:46.41 (Wuhan 2015)
- 3000 metres steeplechase – 9:26.24 (Shiraz 2013)

Indoor

- 800 metres – 1:52.55 (Tehran 2017)
- 1500 metres – 1:51.90 (Tehran 2017)
