= Mohammed Tiouali =

Bahraini middle-distance runner

Personal information
- Full name: Mohammed Ayoub Tiouali
- Born: 26 May 1991 (age 35)

Sport
- Country: Bahrain
- Sport: Athletics
- Event: Middle-distance running
Medal record
Men's middle-distance running
Representing Bahrain
Asian Games
Bronze medal – third place	2018 Jakarta	1500 m
Asian Athletics Championships
Silver medal – second place	2015 Wuhan	1500 m

Mohammed Ayoub Tiouali (born 26 May 1991) is a Bahraini middle-distance runner. He won the bronze medal in the men's 1500 metres at the 2018 Asian Games held in Jakarta, Indonesia.

At the 2015 Asian Athletics Championships held in Wuhan, China, he won the silver medal in the men's 1500 metres event.
