= Musab Adam Ali =

Qatari runner

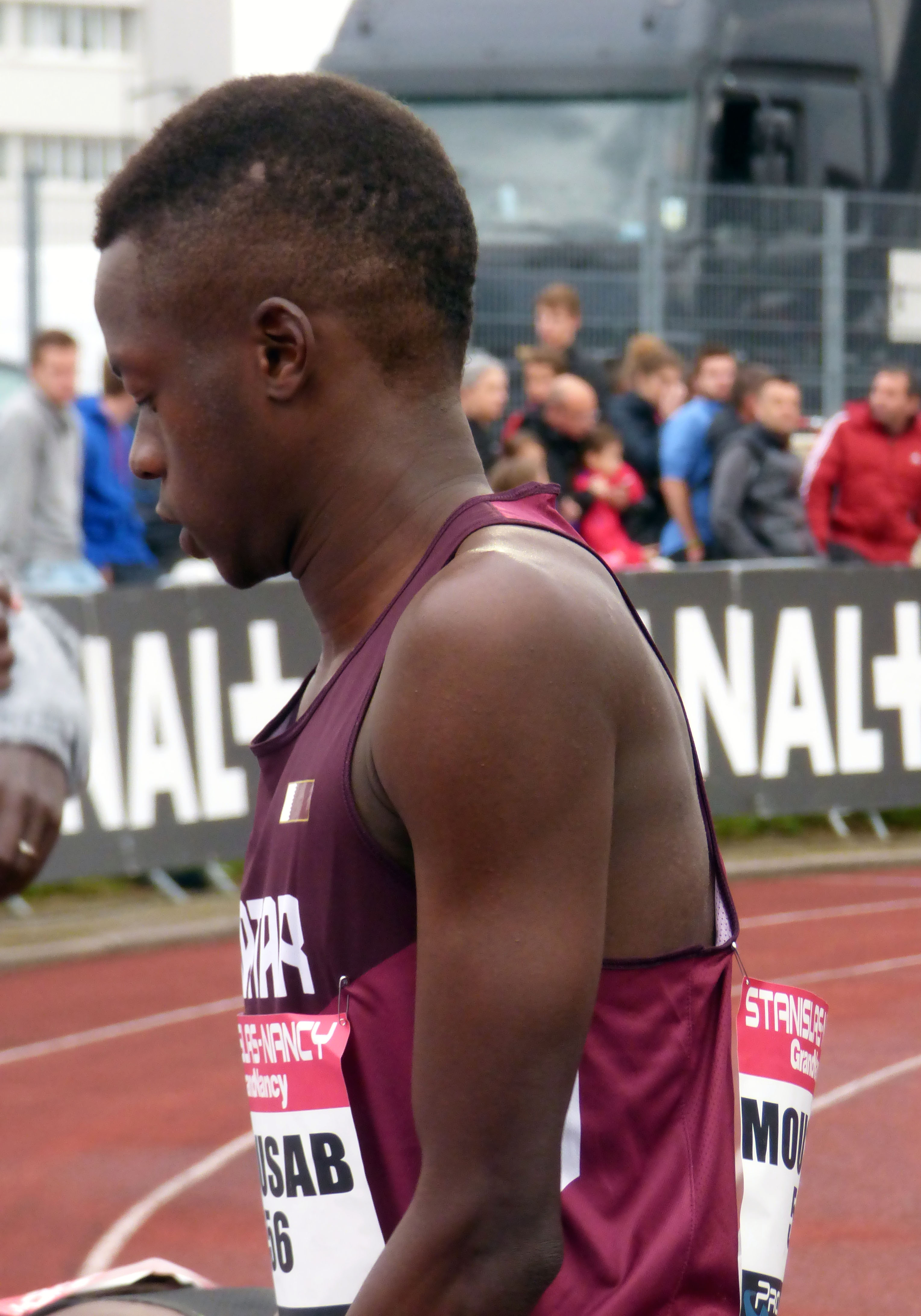

Personal information
- Born: 17 April 1995 (age 31)
- Height: 1.70 m (5 ft 7 in)

Sport
- Sport: Athletics
- Event: 1500 metres
Medal record
Representing Qatar
Asian Championships
Bronze medal – third place	2019 Doha	1500 m
Islamic Solidarity Games
Bronze medal – third place	2021 Konya	3000 m steeplechase
Asian Indoor Championships
Bronze medal – third place	2023 Astana	1500 m
West Asian Championships
Silver medal – second place	2023 Doha	3000 m steeplechase
Asian Junior Championships
Gold medal – first place	2014 Taipei	5000 m
Asian Beach Games
Gold medal – first place	2016 Da Nang	Cross-country team

Musab Adam Ali (Arabic: آدم علي مصعب, born 17 April 1995) is a Qatari middle-distance runner specialising in the 1500 metres. He qualified for the 2020 Summer Olympics with his personal best time of 3:32.41, which he ran in Doha on 14 February 2021.

At the 2014 Asian Junior Athletics Championships, he won the gold medal in the 3000 metres steeplechase and the 5000 metres. At the 2019 Asian Athletics Championships, he finished third in the 1500 metres.

== Personal bests ==
Outdoor

- 800 metres – 1:47.62 (Istanbul 2020)
- 1500 metres – 3:32.41 (Doha 2021)
- Mile – 3:53.15 (Oslo 2020)

Indoor

- 1500 metres – 3:37.30 (Doha 2016)
