= Jinson Johnson =

Indian middle-distance runner (born 1991)

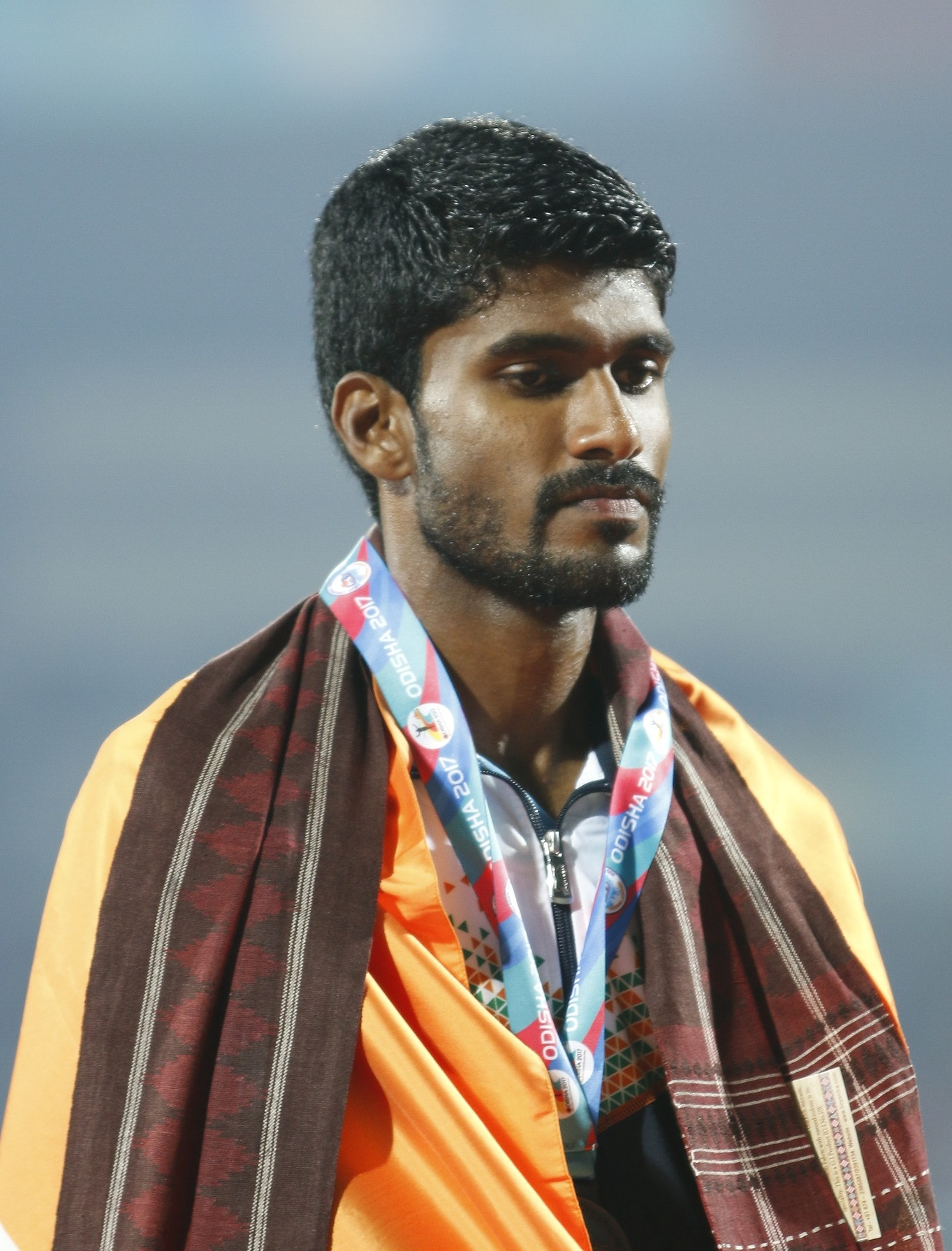
- Johnson at the 2017 Asian Championships

Personal information
- Born: 15 March 1991 (age 35) Chakkittapara, Kerala, India
- Military career
- Branch: Indian Army
- Service years: 2009–present
- Rank: Subedar
- Unit: 851 Light Regiment

Sport
- Sport: Athletics
- Events: 800 m, 1500 m

Achievements and titles
- Personal bests: 800 m: 1:45.65 (2018); 1500 m: 3:35.24 NR (2019)
Medal record
Men's athletics
Representing India
Asian Games
Gold medal – first place	2018 Jakarta	1500m
Silver medal – second place	2018 Jakarta	800m
Bronze medal – third place	2022 Hangzhou	1500m
Asian Championships
Silver medal – second place	2015 Wuhan	800m
Bronze medal – third place	2017 Bhubaneswar	800m

Jinson Johnson (born 15 March 1991) is an Indian former middle-distance runner. He holds the 1500 m national record with a time of 3:35.24 set at 2019 ISTAF Berlin. He was honored with the Arjuna Award in 2018.

== Early life ==
Johnson was born on 15 March 1991 in the town of Chakkittapara in Kozhikode district, Kerala. He did his schooling at the St. George's High School in Kulathuvayal and graduation at the Baselius College in Kottayam. He trained at the Kerala Sports Council's sports hostel in Kottayam, before joining the Indian Army in 2009, where he holds the rank of Subedar.

== Career ==
Johnson won the silver medal in the 800 meters event of the 2015 Asian Athletics Championships held in Wuhan with a time of 1:49.69. He also won three gold medals at the Asian Grand Prix in Thailand the same year.

Johnson qualified for the 800 m event at the 2016 Rio Olympics by clocking his personal best time of 1:45.98 at Bengaluru in July 2016, meeting the Olympics qualification standard of 1:46.00.

At the 2017 Asian Championships, he secured a bronze medal in the 800 m with a timing of 1:50.07.

Johnson broke the long-standing national record of Sriram Singh in 800 meters in June 2018 when he clocked a time of 1:45.65 in Inter-State Athletics Championships.

At the 2018 Asian Games, he won a gold medal in the 1500 m event while in the 800 m he won the silver medal finishing behind compatriot Manjit Singh, who won the gold medal.

At the 2022 Asian Games, he secured a bronze medal in the 1500 m with a timing of 3:39.74.

On 7 January 2026, Johnson announced his retirement from competitive athletics through a social media post.
