= 2017 Asian Athletics Championships =

2017 Asian Championships
- Dates: 6–9 July
- Host city: Bhubaneswar, Odisha, India
- Venue: Kalinga Stadium
- Events: 42
- Participation: 560 athletes from 41 nations

The 2017 Asian Athletics Championships was the 22nd edition of the Asian Athletics Championships. It was held from 6 to 9 July 2017 at the Kalinga Stadium in Bhubaneswar, the capital and the largest city of the Indian state of Odisha. Bhubaneswar was the third Indian city to host Asian Championships. Around 560 athletes from 41 countries attended the event.

The Championships were originally scheduled to be held at Ranchi, Jharkhand. After Ranchi's inability to host this event, Bhubaneswar was selected as the venue for this event. On 30 March 2017 post a detailed presentation by Adille Sumariwalla, President AFI, Bhubaneswar was selected for hosting the Asian Athletics Championship by the Asian Athletics Association Council. The previous edition of the championship was held in Wuhan, China from 3–7 June 2015.

The Asian Athletics Championships are organized by Asian Athletics Association every two years. Bhubaneswar is the third Indian-city to host the Asian Athletics Championship with Delhi in 1989 being the first and Pune in the year 2013 to be the second Indian cities.

The winners of the Championships got a direct berth for the 2017 World Championships in London to be held in August. As host, India was eligible to field three athletes in each discipline, instead of the usual two.

== Venues and infrastructure ==
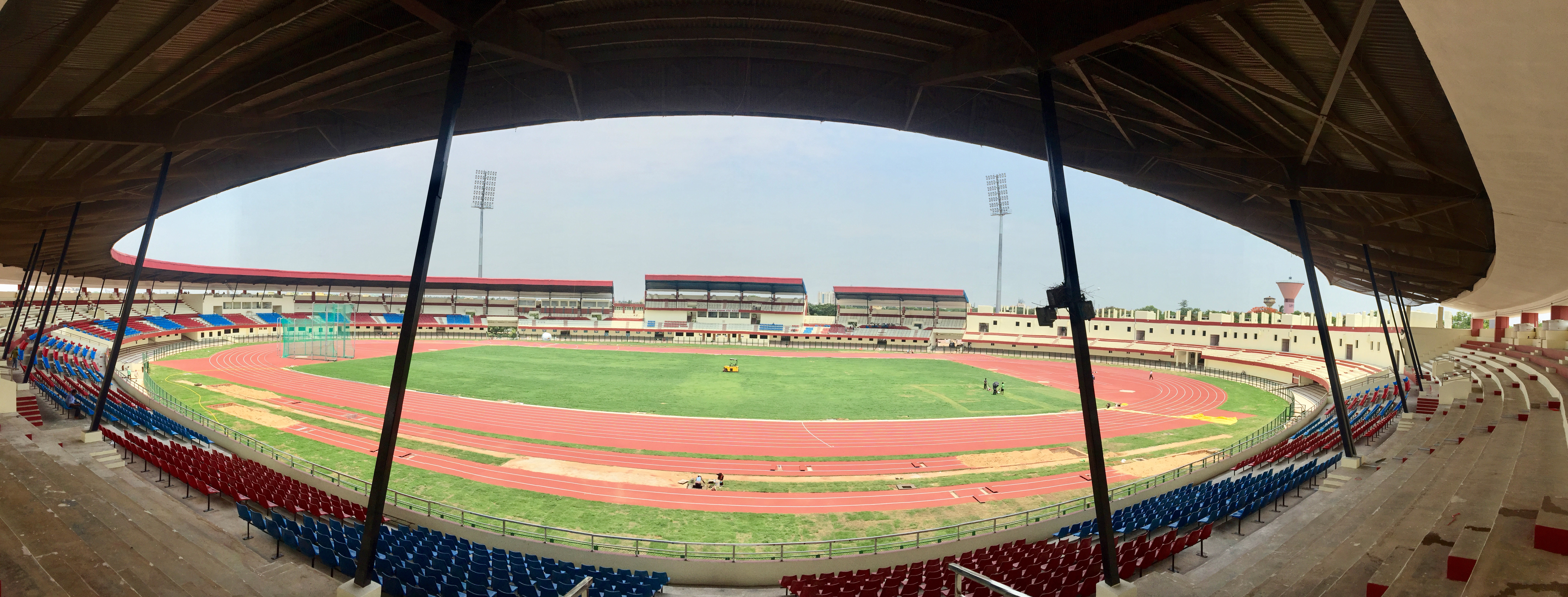
Inside the Kalinga Stadium

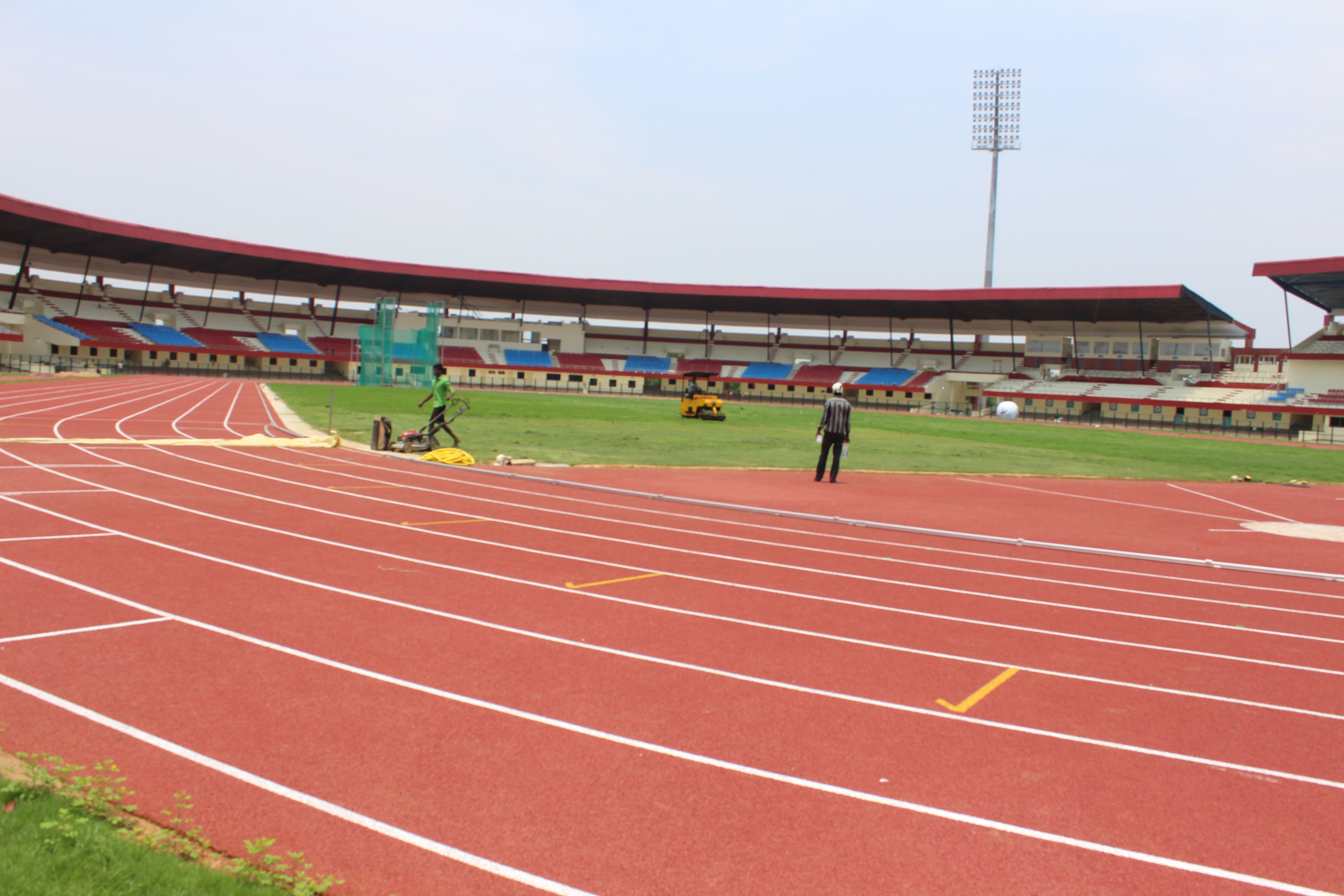
Newly prepared synthetic track of Kalinga Stadium

The event took place at Kalinga Stadium in Bhubaneswar, Odisha. The Kalinga Stadium has the sitting capacity of 50,000 spectators. The stadium was renovated with a new synthetic track, with floodlights and a warm-up facility has been set up to host the event. After Ranchi pull-out from hosting the 2017 Asian Athletics Championships, the 86th Asian Athletics Association Council meeting confirmed Bhubaneswar as the host of 22nd Asian Athletics Championships. The Government of Odisha decided to renovate the Kalinga Stadium within 90 days of time to host the event.

== Logo and mascot ==
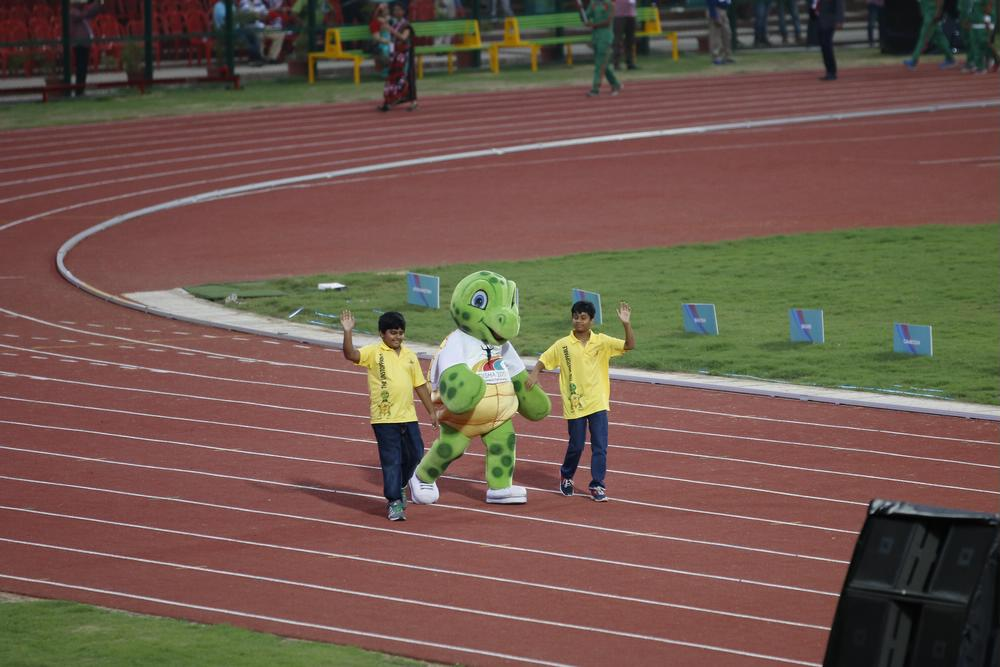
Mascot Olly during the opening ceremony of 22nd Asian Athletics Championships in Bhubaneswar.

On 8 May 2017, the logo and mascot of Championship were released. Olly, the olive ridley sea turtle, an endangered species that travels to Odisha's Rushikulya and Gahirmatha beaches for its nesting, was chosen as the mascot. It was flagged off by the Chief Minister of Odisha, Naveen Patnaik, at the Championships' mascot rally covering 30 districts of the state of Odisha.

== Culture ==
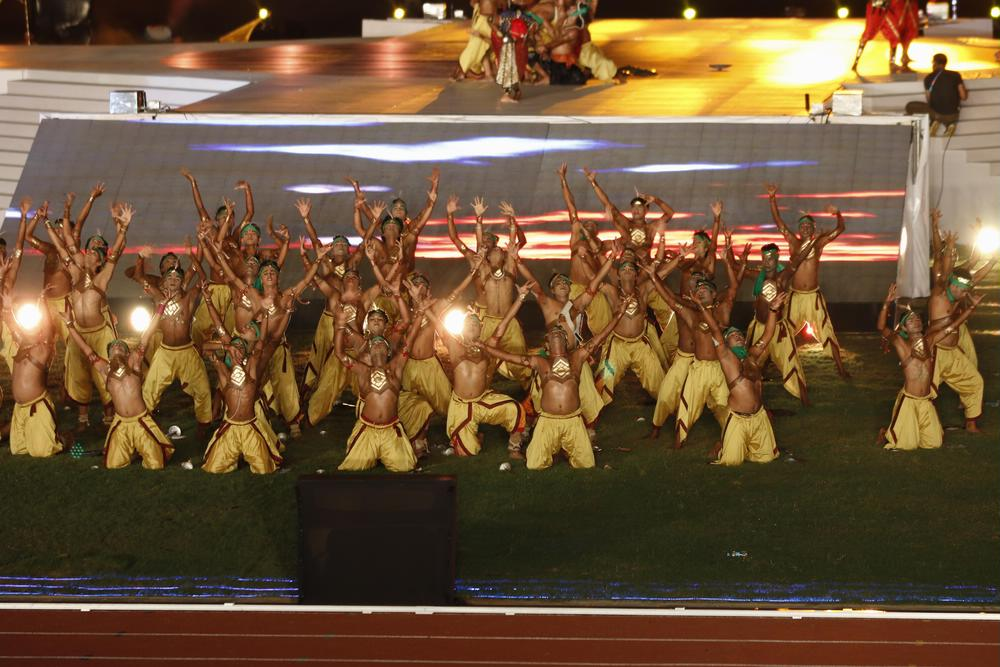
Cultural program on AAC2017

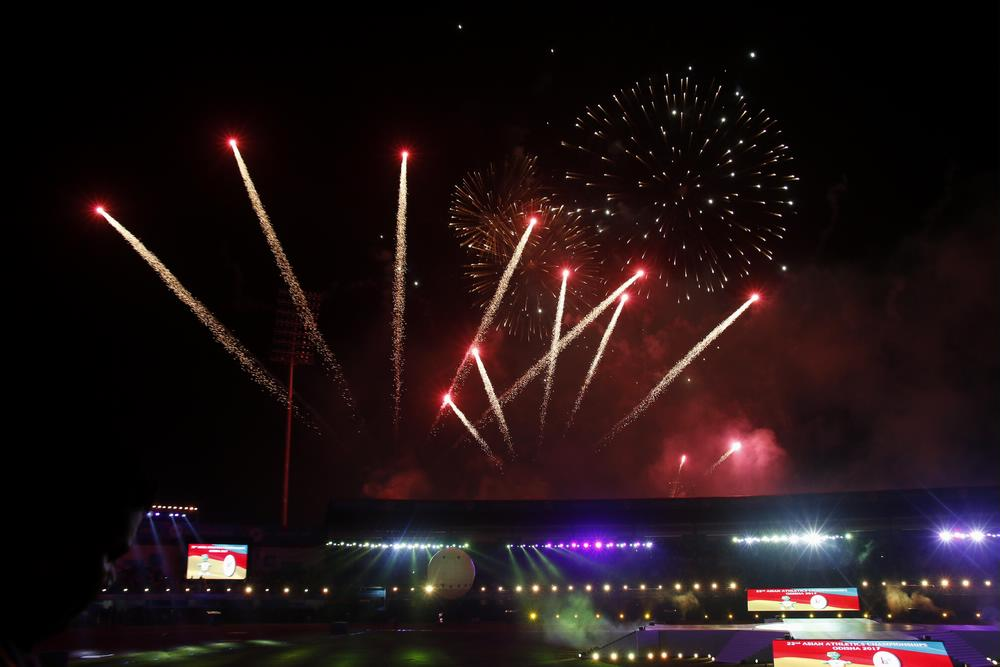
Fireworks on the Opening Day

Over 500 artists performed during the opening ceremony of the championships on 5 July 2017. Around 400 Odissi dancers performed in an act depicting the Kalinga War and Emperor Kharavela. Shankar Mahadevan with his troupe performed the Rangabati song during the event, with the Sambalpuri dance group.

== Media coverage ==
Prasar Bharati, through the Doordarshan (DD), was the exclusive Host Broadcaster for the 22nd Asian Athletics Championships. Doordarshan undertook all the obligations of the Host Broadcaster for the Championships and provided the basic feed of the event.

== Doping ==
The National Anti-Doping Agency (NADA) found that the athlete Manpreet Kaur, Asian champion woman shot putter tested positive for a banned substance.

== Event summary ==
=== Men ===
==== Track ====
Chronology: 2013 | 2015 | 2017 | 2019 | 2021

| Event | Gold | | Silver | | Bronze | |
|---|---|---|---|---|---|---|
| 100 metres | Hassan Taftian; Iran | 10.25 | Femi Ogunode; Qatar | 10.26 | Yang Chun-han; Chinese Taipei | 10.31 |
| 200 metres | Yang Chun-han; Chinese Taipei | 20.66 | Park Bong-go; South Korea | 20.76 | Femi Ogunode; Qatar | 20.79 |
| 400 metres | Mohammad Anas; India | 45.77 | Arokia Rajiv; India | 46.14 | Ahmed Mubarak Al-Saadi; Oman | 46.39 |
| 800 metres | Ebrahim Al-Zofairi; Kuwait | 1:49.47 | Jamal Hairane; Qatar | 1:49.94 | Jinson Johnson; India | 1:50.07 |
| 1500 metres | Ajay Kumar Saroj; India | 3:45.85 | Jamal Hairane; Qatar | 3:46.90 | Moslem Niadoost; Iran | 3:48.53 |
| 5000 metres | Govindan Lakshmanan; India | 14:54.48 | Yaser Salem Bagharab; Qatar | 14:55.89 | Tariq Ahmed Al-Amri; Saudi Arabia | 14:56.83 |
| 10,000 metres | Govindan Lakshmanan; India | 29:55.87 | Gopi Thonakal; India | 29:58.89 | Adilet Kyshtakbekov; Kyrgyzstan | 30:06.65 |
| 110 metres hurdles | Abdulaziz Al-Mandeel; Kuwait | 13.50 | Yaqoub Mohamed Al-Youha; Kuwait | 13.59 | Ahmed Khader Al-Muwallad; Saudi Arabia | 13.61 |
| 400 metres hurdles | Eric Cray; Philippines | 49.57 | Chen Chieh; Chinese Taipei | 49.75 | Jabir M.P. India | 50.22 |
| 3000 metres steeplechase | Hossein Keyhani; Iran | 8:43.82 | Yaser Salem Bagharab; Qatar | 8:46.16 | Ali Ahmad Al-Amri; Saudi Arabia | 8:52.64 |
| 4 × 100 metres relay | China (CHN); Tang Xingqiang; Liang Jinsheng; Bie Ge; Xu Haiyang; Xu Zhouzheng* | 39.38 | Thailand (THA); Kritsada Namsuwan; Bandit Chuangchai; Jirapong Meenapra; Jaran Sathoengram; Ruttanapon Sowan* | 39.38 | Hong Kong (HKG); So Chun Hong; Ng Ka Fung; Tang Yik Chun; Tsui Chi Ho; Wan Hin Chung* | 39.53 |
| 4 × 400 metres relay | India (IND); Kunhu Muhammed; Amoj Jacob; Arokia Rajiv; Mohammad Anas; Mohan Kumar*; Sachin Roby* | 3:02.92 | Sri Lanka (SRI); Tharusha Dananjaya; Kalinga Kumarage; Ajith Premakumara; Dilip Ruwan | 3:04.80 | Thailand (THA); Apisit Chamsri; Nattapong Kongkraphan; Jirayu Pleenaram; Phitchaya Sunthonthuam; Vitsanu Phosri* | 3:06.48 |
WR world record | AR area record | CR championship record | GR games record | NR national record | OR Olympic record | PB personal best | SB season best | WL world leading (in a given season)

- Athletes with stars competed in the heats but not the finals, and received medals.

==== Field ====
Chronology: 2013 | 2015 | 2017 | 2019 | 2021

| Event | Gold | | Silver | | Bronze | |
|---|---|---|---|---|---|---|
| High jump | Woo Sang-hyeok; South Korea | 2.30 m =PB | Zhang Guowei; China | 2.28 m | Majd Eddin Ghazal; Syria | 2.24 m |
| Pole vault | Ding Bangchao; China | 5.65 m | Masaki Ejima; Japan | 5.65 m AJR | Ernest John Obiena; Philippines | 5.50 m |
| Long jump | Huang Changzhou; China | 8.09 m | Chan Ming Tai; Hong Kong | 8.03 m | Shotaro Shiroyama; Japan | 7.97 m |
| Triple jump | Zhu Yaming; China | 16.82 m | Mark Harry Diones; Philippines | 16.45 m | Xu Xiaolong; China | 16.45 m |
| Shot put | Ali Samari; Iran | 19.80 m | Tejinder Pal Singh; India | 19.77 m | Ivan Ivanov; Kazakhstan | 19.41 m |
| Discus throw | Ehsan Haddadi; Iran | 64.54 m | Muhammad Irfan; Malaysia | 60.96 m | Vikas Gowda; India | 60.81 m |
| Hammer throw | Dilshod Nazarov; Tajikistan | 76.69 m | Wang Shizhu; China | 73.81 m | Lee Yun-chul; South Korea | 73.77 m NR |
| Javelin throw | Neeraj Chopra; India | 85.23 m CR | Ahmed Bader Magour; Qatar | 83.70 m | Davinder Singh Kang; India | 83.29 m |
WR world record | AR area record | CR championship record | GR games record | NR national record | OR Olympic record | PB personal best | SB season best | WL world leading (in a given season)

==== Combined ====
Chronology: 2013 | 2015 | 2017 | 2019 | 2021

| Event | Gold | | Silver | | Bronze | |
|---|---|---|---|---|---|---|
| Decathlon | Sutthisak Singkhon; Thailand | 7732 pts PB | Kazuya Kawasaki; Japan | 7584 pts | Guo Qi; China | 7495 pts |
WR world record | AR area record | CR championship record | GR games record | NR national record | OR Olympic record | PB personal best | SB season best | WL world leading (in a given season)

=== Women ===
==== Track ====
Chronology: 2013 | 2015 | 2017 | 2019 | 2021

| Event | Gold | | Silver | | Bronze | |
|---|---|---|---|---|---|---|
| 100 metres | Viktoriya Zyabkina; Kazakhstan | 11.39 | Olga Safronova; Kazakhstan | 11.45 | Dutee Chand; India | 11.52 |
| 200 metres | Viktoriya Zyabkina; Kazakhstan | 23.10 | Rumeshika Rathnayake; Sri Lanka | 23.43 | Olga Safronova; Kazakhstan | 23.47 |
| 400 metres | Quách Thị Lan; Vietnam | 52.78 | Jisna Mathew; India | 53.32 | M. R. Poovamma; India | 53.36 |
| 800 metres | Nimali Liyanarachchi; Sri Lanka | 2:05.23 | Gayanthika Abeyrathne; Sri Lanka | 2:05.27 | Fumika Omori; Japan | 2:06.50 |
| 1500 metres | PU Chitra; India | 4:17.92 | Geng Min; China | 4:19.15 | Ayako Jinnouchi; Japan | 4:19.90 |
| 5000 metres | Darya Maslova; Kyrgyzstan | 15:57.95 | Alia Saeed Mohammed; United Arab Emirates | 15:59.95 | Sanjivani Jadhav; India | 16:00.24 |
| 10,000 metres | Darya Maslova; Kyrgyzstan | 32:21.21 | Yuka Hori; Japan | 32:23.26 | Mizuki Matsuda; Japan | 32:46.61 |
| 100 metres hurdles | Jung Hye-lim; South Korea | 13.16 | Ayako Kimura; Japan | 13.30 | Wang Dou; China | 13.36 |
| 400 metres hurdles | Nguyễn Thị Huyền; Vietnam | 56.14 | Anu Raghavan; India | 57.22 | Sayaka Aoki; Japan | 58.18 |
| 3000 metres steeplechase | Sudha Singh; India | 9:59.47 | Hyo Gyong; North Korea | 10:13.94 | Nana Sato; Japan | 10:18.11 |
| 4 × 100 metres relay | Kazakhstan (KAZ); Rima Kashafutdinova; Viktoriya Zyabkina; Merjen Ishangulyyeva; Olga Safronova | 43.53 | China (CHN); Sun Fengyan; Kong Lingwei; Lin Huijun; Feng Lulu | 44.50 | India (IND); Merlin Joseph; Himashree Roy; Srabani Nanda; Dutee Chand | 44.57 |
| 4 × 400 metres relay | Vietnam (VIE); Nguyễn Thị Oanh; Quách Thị Lan; Hoàng Thị Ngọc; Nguyễn Thị Huyền | 3:33.22 | Japan (JPN); Sayaka Aoki; Kana Ichikawa; Seika Aoyama; Manami Kira | 3:37.74 | Kazakhstan (KAZ); Svetlana Golendova; Elina Mikhina; Adelina Akhmetova; Merjen Ishangulyeva | 3:37.95 |

==== Field ====
Chronology: 2013 | 2015 | 2017 | 2019 | 2021

| Event | Gold | | Silver | | Bronze | |
|---|---|---|---|---|---|---|
| High jump | Nadiya Dusanova; Uzbekistan | 1.84 m | Yeung Man Wai; Hong Kong Wang Xueyi; China Liu Jingyi; China | 1.80 m | Not awarded | |
| Pole vault | Chen Qiaoling; China | 4.40 m | Li Ling; China | 4.20 m | Chayanusa Chomchuendee; Thailand | 4.10 m |
| Long jump | Bùi Thị Thu Thảo; Vietnam | 6.54 m | Nellickal V. Neena; India | 6.54 m | Nayana James; India | 6.42 m |
| Triple jump | Mariya Ovchinnikova; Kazakhstan | 13.72 m | Irina Ektova; Kazakhstan | 13.62 m | N.V. Sheena; India | 13.42 m |
| Shot put | Guo Tianqian; China | 17.91 m | Aya Ota; Japan | 15.45 m | Nanaka Kori; Japan | 15.33 m |
| Discus throw | Chen Yang; China | 60.41 m | Subenrat Insaeng; Thailand | 56.82 m | Lu Xiaoxin; China | 55.27 m |
| Hammer throw | Luo Na; China | 69.92 m | Liu Tingting; China | 69.45 m | Hitomi Katsuyama; Japan | 60.22 m |
| Javelin throw | Li Lingwei; China | 63.06 m CR | Dilhani Lekamage; Sri Lanka | 58.11 m PB | Annu Rani; India | 57.32 m |
WR world record | AR area record | CR championship record | GR games record | NR national record | OR Olympic record | PB personal best | SB season best | WL world leading (in a given season)

==== Combined ====
Chronology: 2013 | 2015 | 2017 | 2019 | 2021

| Event | Gold | | Silver | | Bronze | |
|---|---|---|---|---|---|---|
| Heptathlon | Swapna Barman; India | 5942 pts PB | Meg Hemphill; Japan | 5883 pts | Purnima Hembram; India | 5798 pts |
WR world record | AR area record | CR championship record | GR games record | NR national record | OR Olympic record | PB personal best | SB season best | WL world leading (in a given season)

== Medal table ==
* Host nation (India)

| Rank | Nation | Gold | Silver | Bronze | Total |
|---|---|---|---|---|---|
| 1 | India (IND)* | 10 | 6 | 13 | 29 |
| 2 | China (CHN) | 8 | 7 | 5 | 20 |
| 3 | Kazakhstan (KAZ) | 4 | 2 | 1 | 7 |
| 4 | Iran (IRI) | 4 | 0 | 1 | 5 |
| 5 | Vietnam (VIE) | 4 | 0 | 0 | 4 |
| 6 | South Korea (KOR) | 2 | 1 | 1 | 4 |
| 7 | Kuwait (KWT) | 2 | 1 | 0 | 3 |
| 8 | Kyrgyzstan (KGZ) | 2 | 0 | 1 | 3 |
| 9 | Sri Lanka (SRI) | 1 | 4 | 0 | 5 |
| 10 | Thailand (THA) | 1 | 2 | 2 | 5 |
| 11 | Chinese Taipei (TPE) | 1 | 1 | 1 | 3 |
| 11 | Philippines (PHI) | 1 | 1 | 1 | 3 |
| 13 | Tajikistan (TJK) | 1 | 0 | 0 | 1 |
| 13 | Uzbekistan (UZB) | 1 | 0 | 0 | 1 |
| 15 | Japan (JPN) | 0 | 6 | 8 | 14 |
| 16 | Qatar (QAT) | 0 | 6 | 1 | 7 |
| 17 | Hong Kong (HKG) | 0 | 2 | 1 | 3 |
| 18 | Malaysia (MYS) | 0 | 1 | 0 | 1 |
| 18 | North Korea (PRK) | 0 | 1 | 0 | 1 |
| 18 | United Arab Emirates (UAE) | 0 | 1 | 0 | 1 |
| 21 | Saudi Arabia (KSA) | 0 | 0 | 3 | 3 |
| 22 | Oman (OMN) | 0 | 0 | 1 | 1 |
| 22 | Syria (SYR) | 0 | 0 | 1 | 1 |
| Totals (23 entries) | | 42 | 42 | 41 | 125 |

== Participating nations ==
A total 560 athletes from 41 nations attended the event.

- Afghanistan (7)
- Bangladesh (18)
- Bahrain (1)
- Bhutan (1)
- Cambodia (2)
- China (50)
- Chinese Taipei (23)
- Hong Kong (15)
- India (87)
- Indonesia (4)
- Iran (14)
- Iraq (10)
- Japan (54)
- Jordan (4)
- Kazakhstan (29)
- Kuwait (18)
- Kyrgyzstan (6)
- Lebanon (8)
- Macau (5)
- Malaysia (19)
- Maldives (10)
- Mongolia (4)
- Myanmar (3)
- Nepal (5)
- North Korea (4)
- Oman (9)
- Pakistan (5)
- Philippines (7)
- Qatar (10)
- Saudi Arabia (14)
- Singapore (9)
- South Korea (21)
- Sri Lanka (21)
- Syria (2)
- Tajikistan (7)
- Thailand (27)
- Timor-Leste (3)
- United Arab Emirates (8)
- Uzbekistan (7)
- Vietnam (6)
- Yemen (3)

== Gallery ==
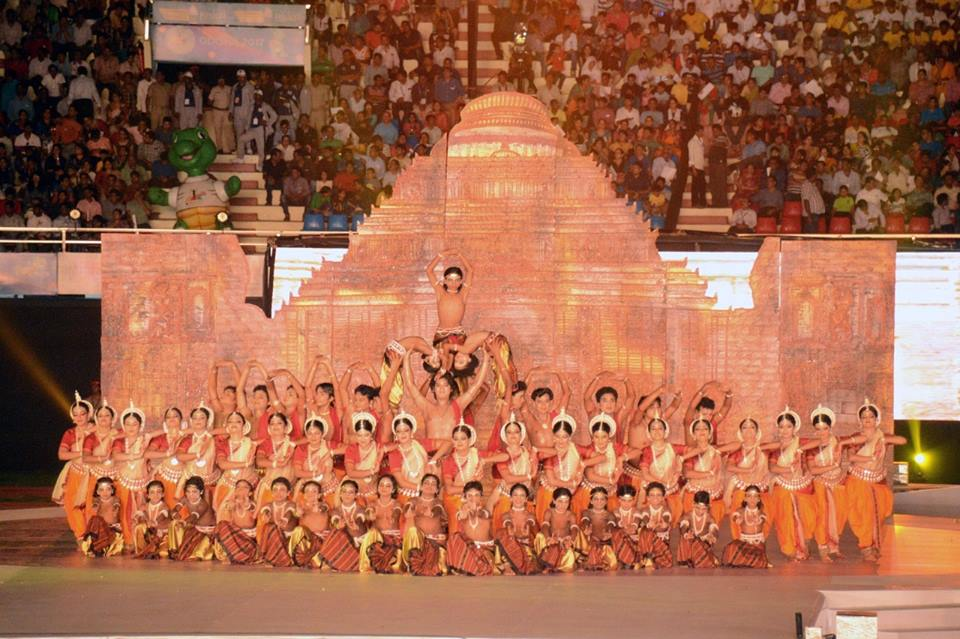
Opening Ceremony of AAC 2017.

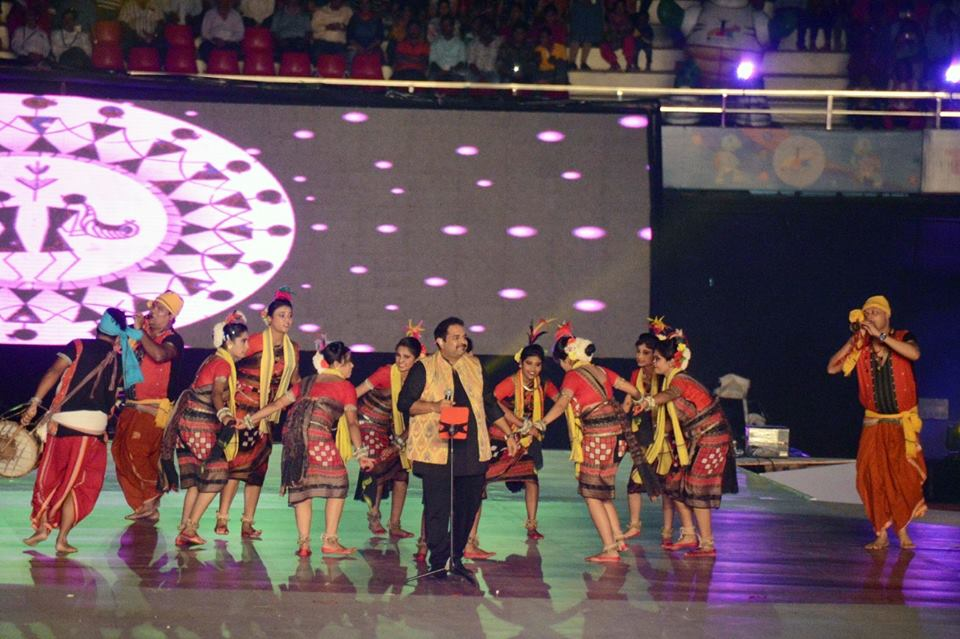
Opening Ceremony of AAC 2017.

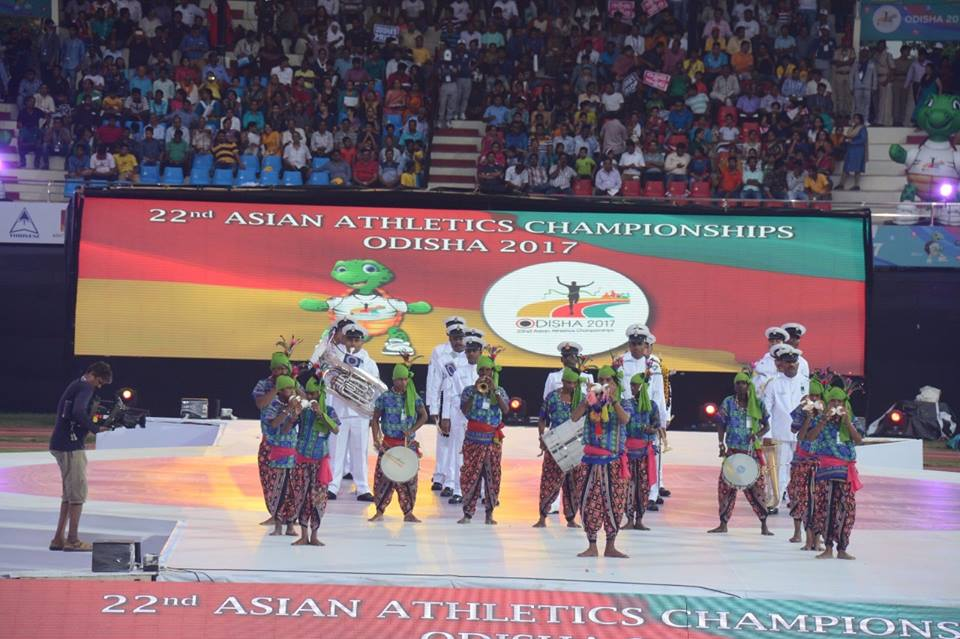
Opening Ceremony of AAC 2017.

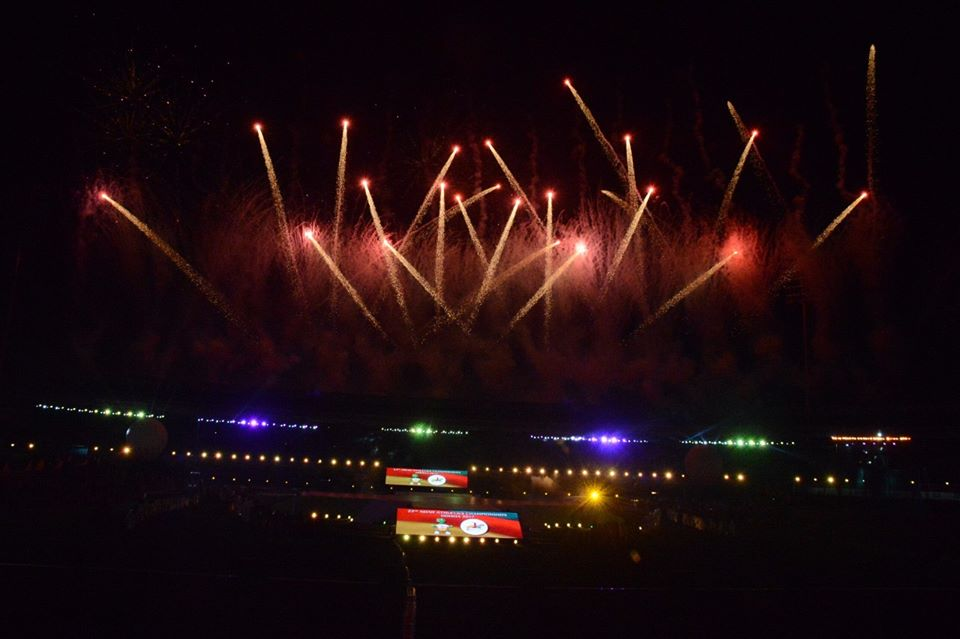
Opening Ceremony of AAC 2017.

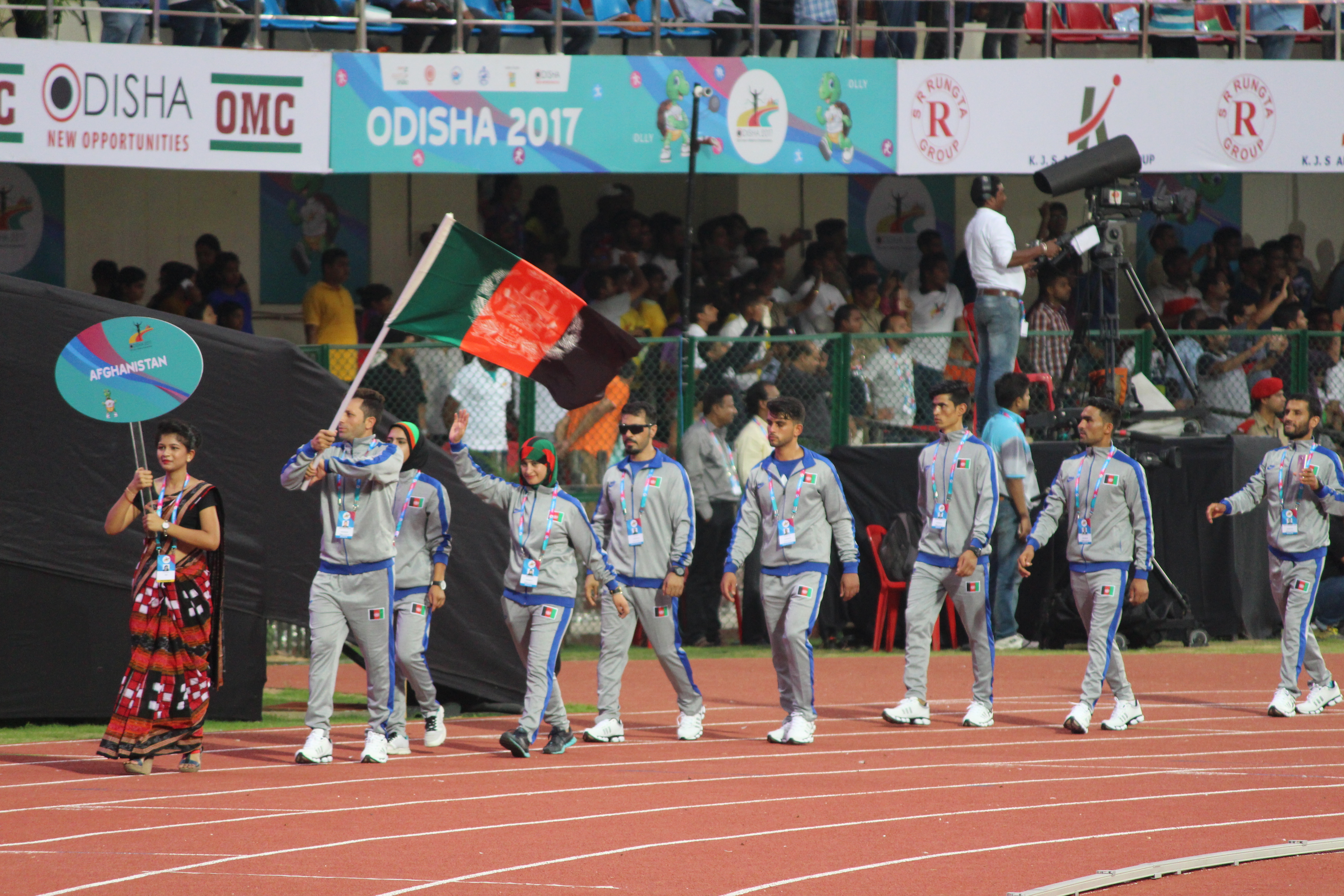
Athletes from Afghanistan bearing the national flag during the opening ceremony.

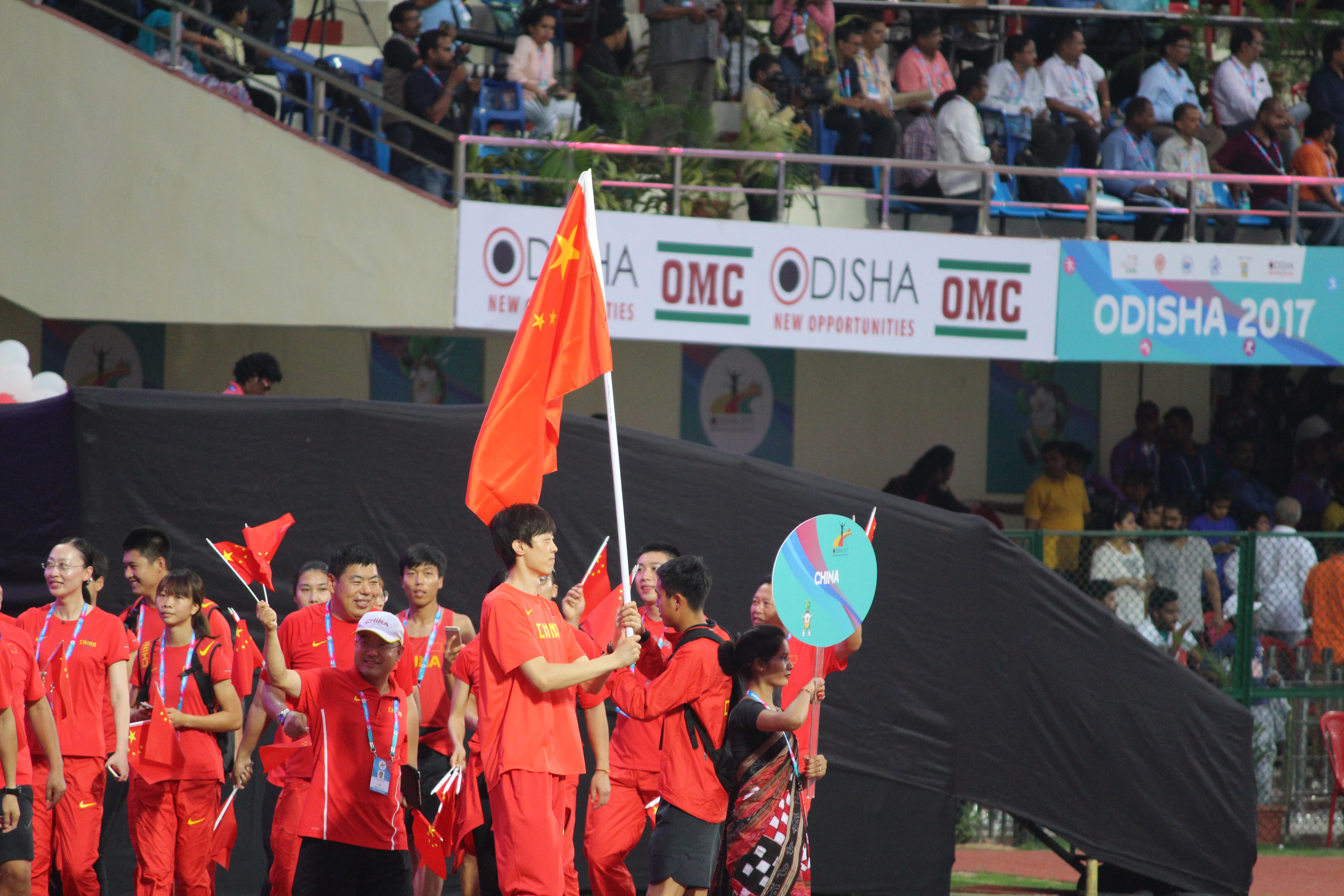
Athletes from China bearing the national flag during the opening ceremony.

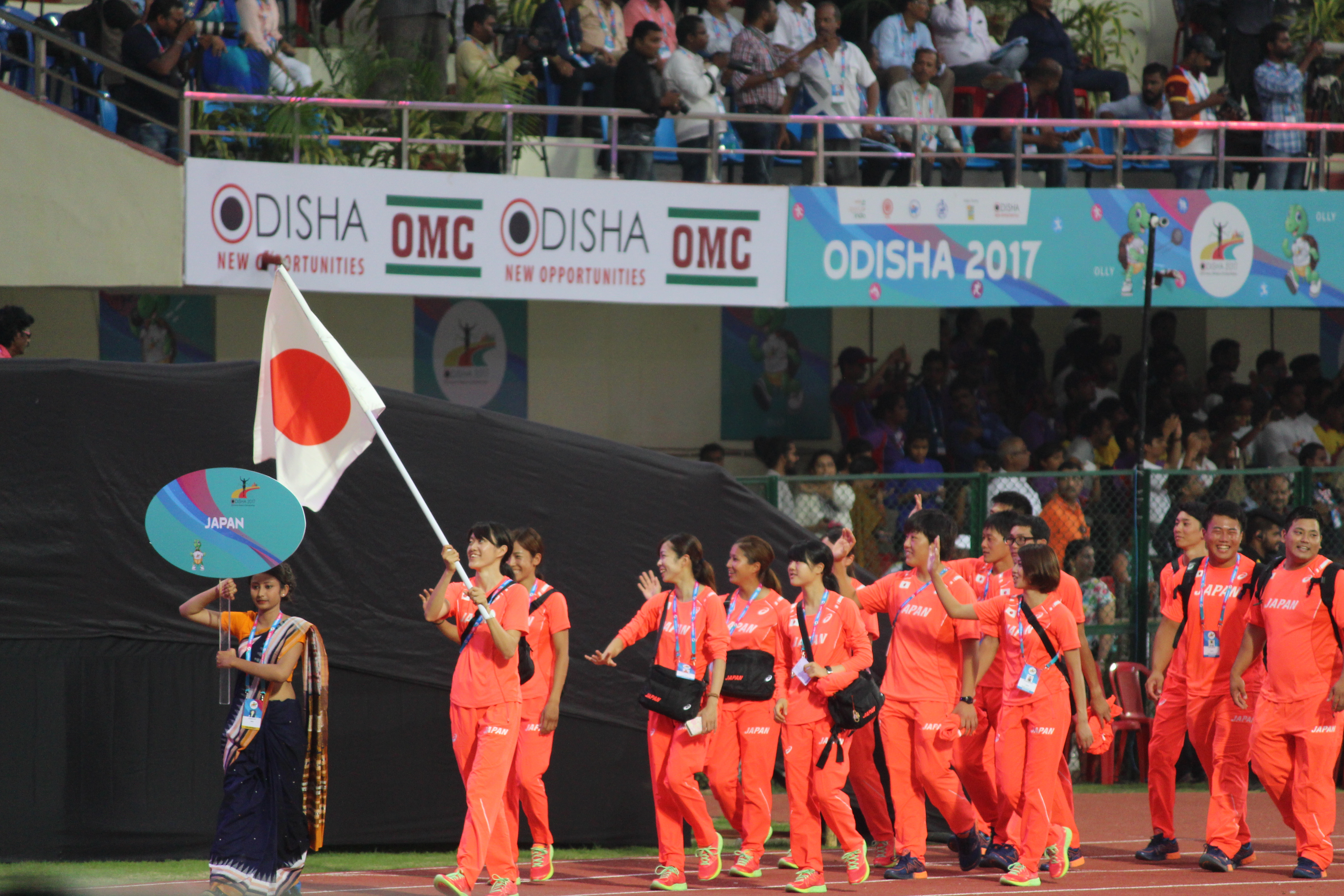
Athletes from Japan bearing the national flag during the opening ceremony.

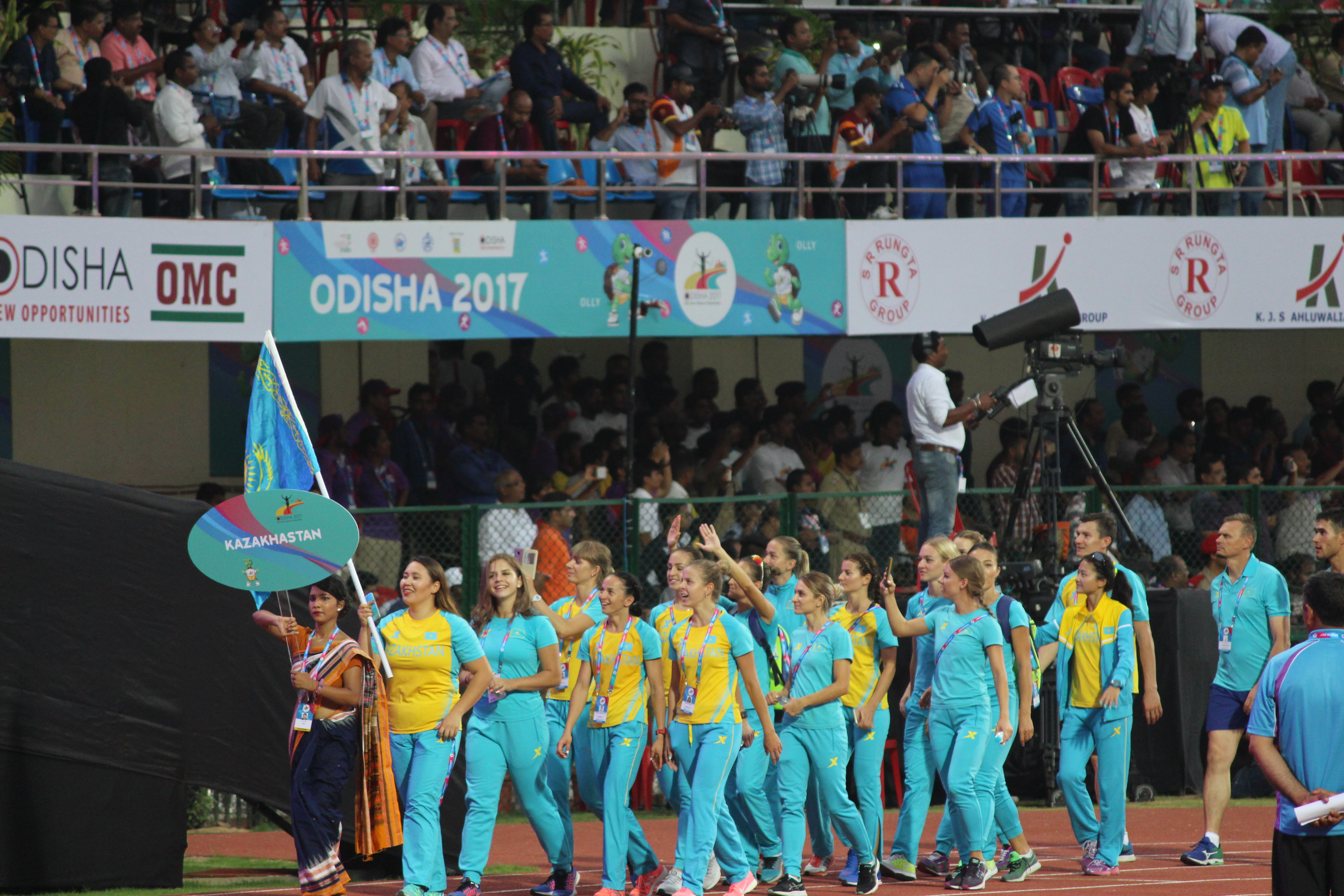
Athletes from Kazakhstan bearing the national flag during the opening ceremony.

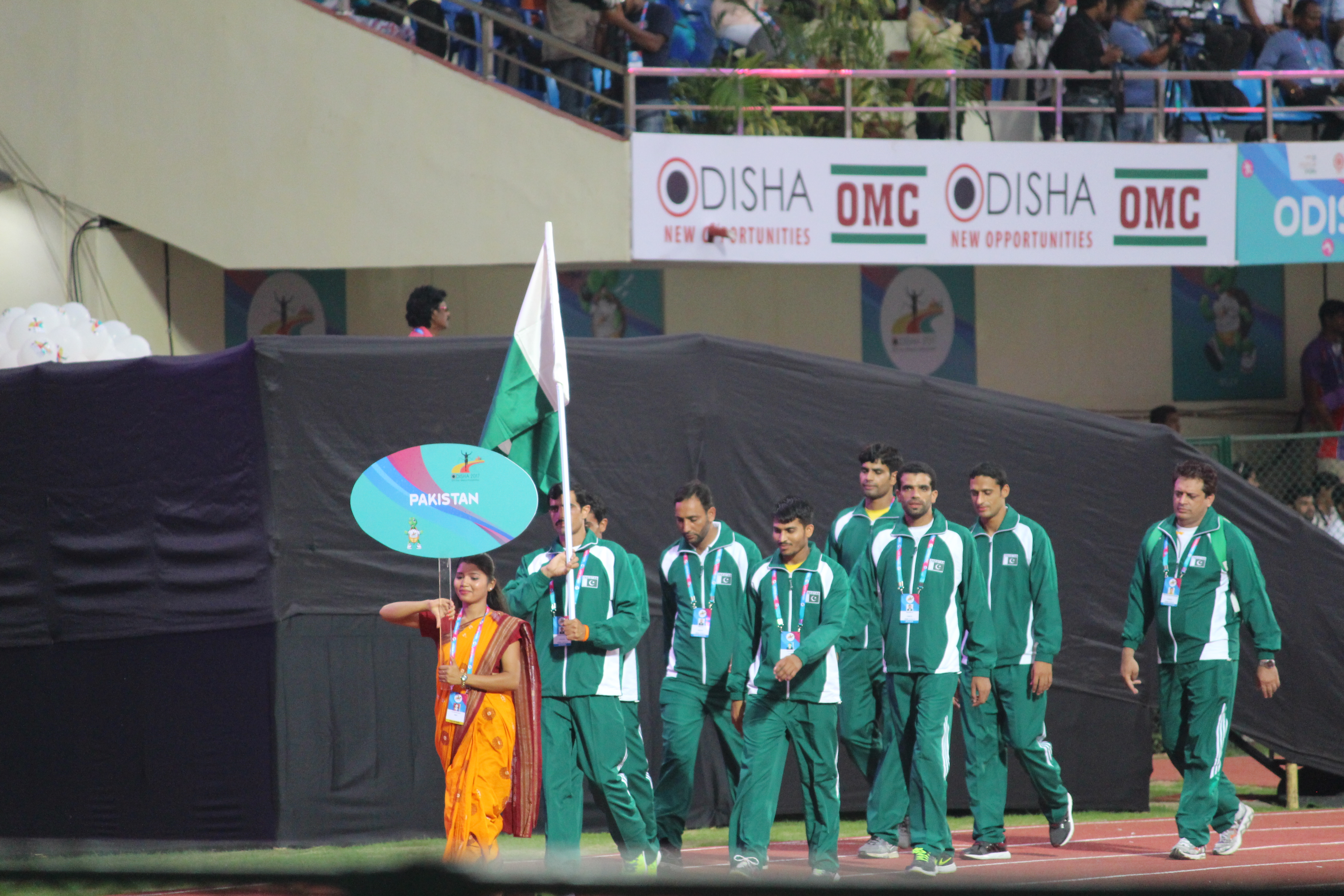
Athletes from Pakistan bearing the national flag during the opening ceremony.

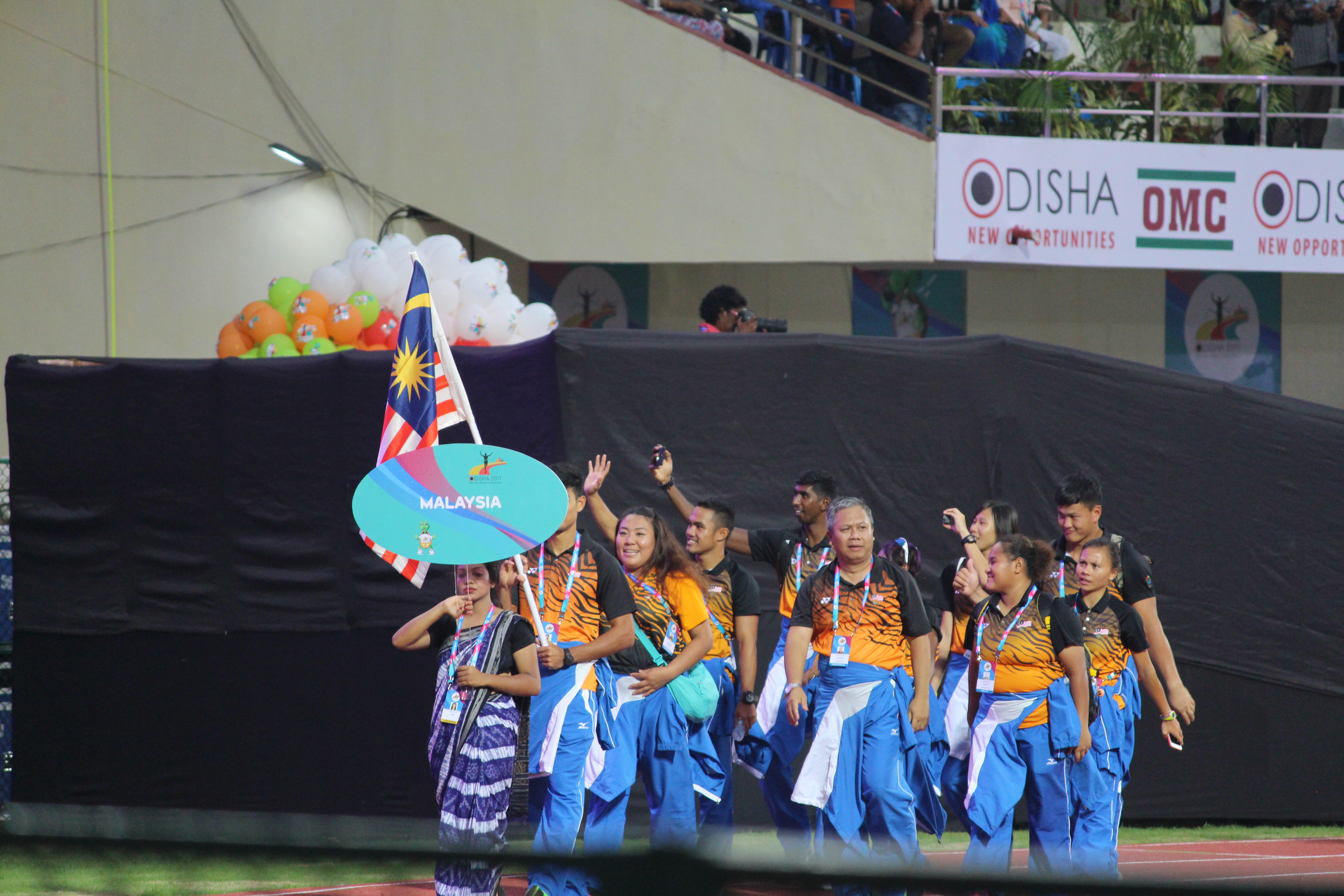
Athletes from Malaysia bearing the national flag during the opening ceremony.

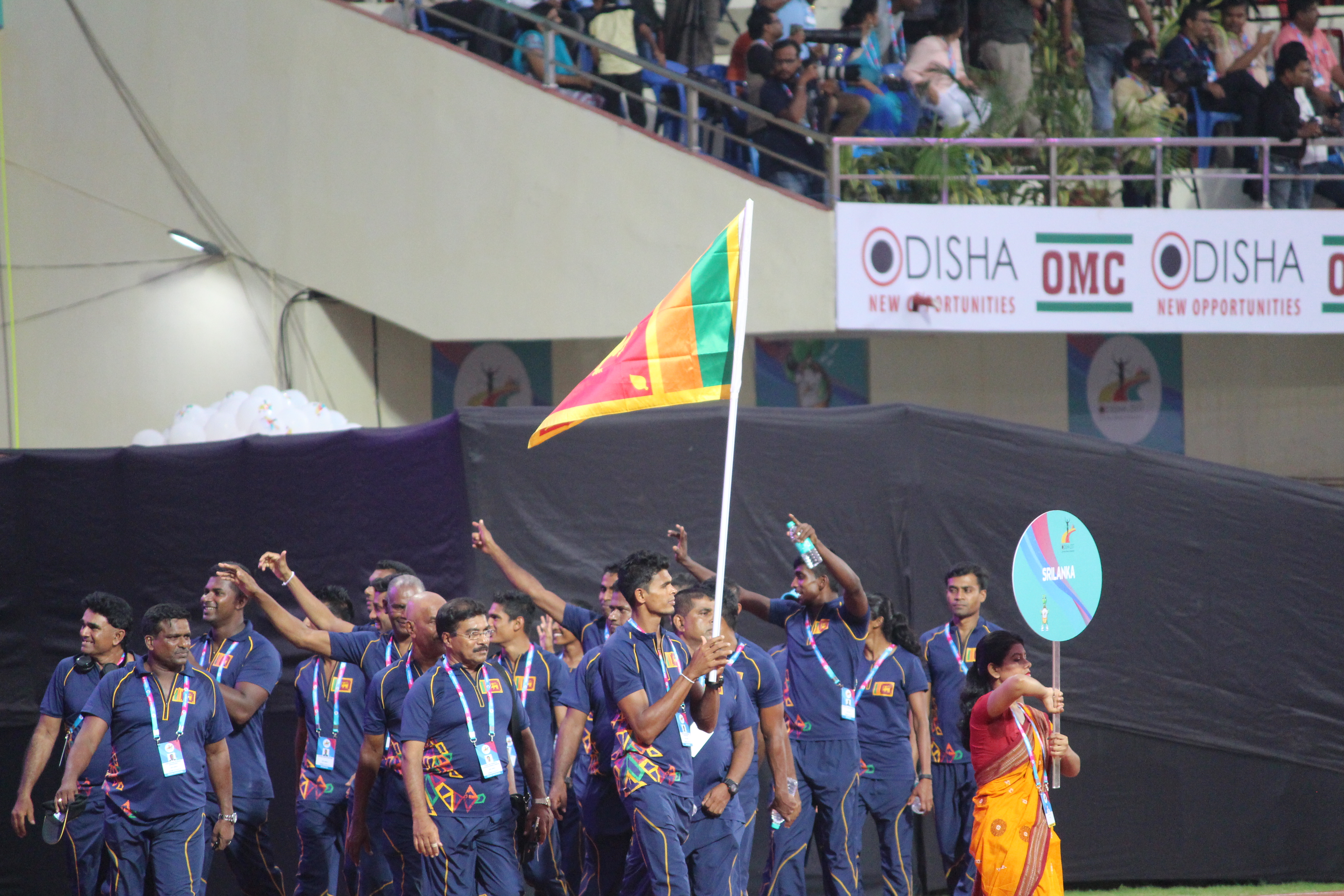
Athletes from Sri Lanka bearing the national flag during the opening ceremony.

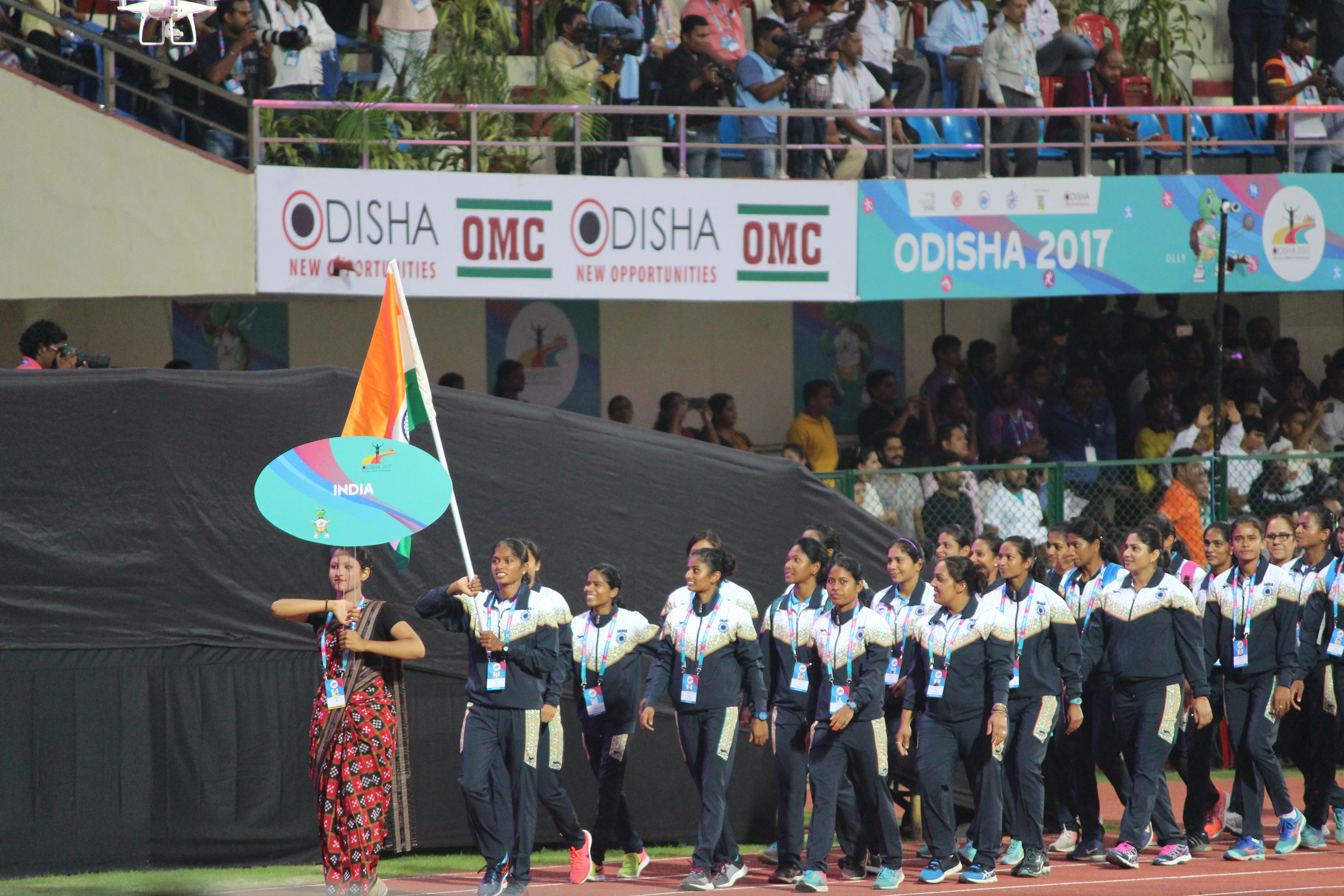
Athletes from India bearing the national flag during the opening ceremony.

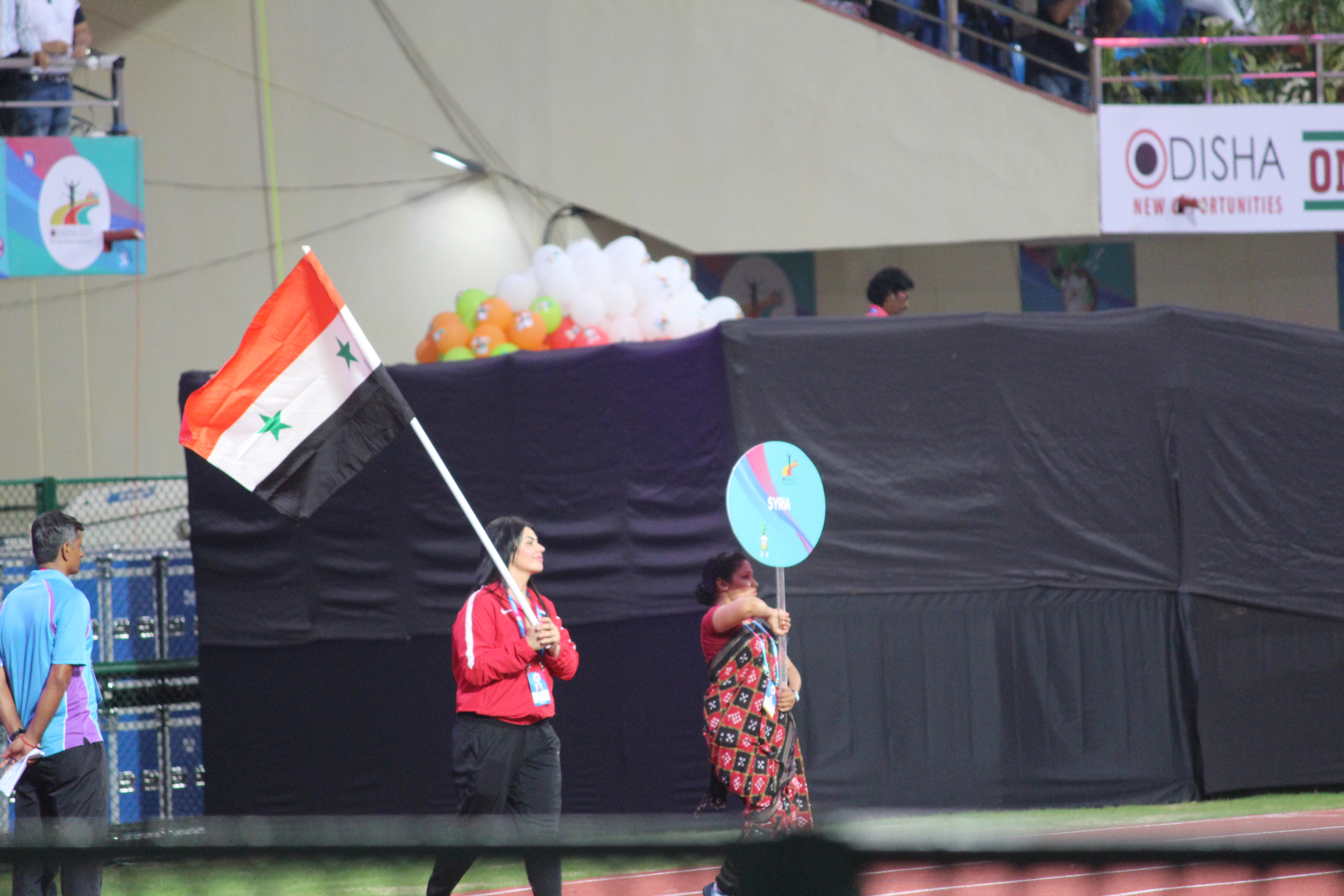
Hiba Omar from Syria bearing the national flag during the opening ceremony.
