= Track and field at the 2015 Military World Games – Men's 400 metres =

The men's 400 metres event at the 2015 Military World Games was held on 5 and 6 October at the KAFAC Sports Complex.

== Records ==
Prior to this competition, the existing world and CISM record were as follows:

World Record	Michael Johnson (USA)	43.18	Sevilla, Spain	26 August 1999
CISM World Record	David Kirui (KEN)	45.30	Tivoli, Lazio, Italy	September 2002

== Schedule ==
Date	Time	Round
5 October 2015	12:30	Round 1
6 October 2015	10:40	Semifinals
6 October 2015	14:40	Final

== Medalists ==
Gold	Silver	Bronze
Yousef Masrahi; Saudi Arabia	Arokia Rajiv; India	Abubakar Abbas; Bahrain

== Results ==
=== Round 1 ===
Qualification: First 3 in each heat (Q) and next 6 fastest (q) qualified for the semifinals.

Rank	Heat	Name	Nationality	Time	Notes
1	4	Yavuz Can	Turkey	46.03	Q
2	5	Arokia Rajiv	India	46.35	Q
3	6	Yousef Masrahi	Saudi Arabia	46.36	Q
4	6	Pavel Ivashko	Russia	46.66	Q
5	1	Alphas Kishoyian	Kenya	46.75	Q
6	5	Abubakar Abbas	Bahrain	46.96	Q
7	1	Ahmed Mubarak Salah	Oman	47.16	Q
8	2	Mehdi Zamani	Iran	47.30	Q
9	6	Alberth Bravo	Venezuela	47.38	Q
10	5	Sajjad Hashemiahangari	Iran	47.44	Q
11	1	Mohammad Anas Yahiya	India	47.53	Q
12	2	Kasun Kalhar Kankanamlage	Sri Lanka	47.58	Q
13	3	Silvan Lutz	Switzerland	47.63	Q
14	4	Łukasz Krawczuk	Poland	47.63	Q
15	2	Hugo Balduíno de Sousa	Brazil	47.63	Q
16	1	Dilip Ruwan Herath Mudiyanselage	Sri Lanka	47.65	q
17	5	Mohamed Elnour Mohamed	Qatar	47.70	q
18	5	Othman Al-Busaidi	Oman	47.72	q
19	3	Kacper Kozłowski	Poland	47.74	Q
20	4	Daniele Angelella	Switzerland	47.75	Q
21	4	Yon Manuel Soriano Carty	Dominican Republic	47.88	q
22	3	Kim Gwang-yeol	South Korea	48.08	Q
23	2	Deverne Charles	Trinidad and Tobago	48.20	q
24	6	Stefan Vukadinović	Serbia	48.20	q
25	3	Joel Mejia	Dominican Republic	48.52	
26	2	Tibor Kasa	Hungary	48.54	
27	1	Anika Prince	Trinidad and Tobago	48.90	
28	5	Hyun Eum-su	South Korea	49.09	
29	6	Hamid Saleem	Kuwait	49.10	
30	3	Vincent Mumo Kiilu	Kenya	49.19	
31	4	Mazen Alyasen	Saudi Arabia	49.29	
32	5	Ricardo Henry	United States	49.32	
33	4	Darwin Reyes	Venezuela	49.65	
34	2	Vincent Duguay	Canada	49.72	
35	1	Mansour Hassan	Lebanon	50.13	
36	3	Alex Tourigny-Plante	Canada	50.24	
37	4	Alessio Antonio Bustos Silva	Chile	51.24	
38	2	Dakota Yemen Porter	United States	53.93	
	6	Pedro Luiz Burmann	Brazil	DNS	
	1	Emmanuel Bingu Chimdzeka	Malawi	DNS	
	3	Pethias Barclays Gondwe Mdoka	Malawi	DNS	

=== Semifinals ===
Qualification: First 2 in each heat (Q) and next 2 fastest (q) qualified for the final.

Rank	Heat	Name	Nationality	Time	Notes
1	1	Abubakar Abbas	Bahrain	45.93	Q
2	1	Arokia Rajiv	India	46.14	Q
3	1	Yavuz Can	Turkey	46.17	q
4	2	Yousef Masrahi	Saudi Arabia	46.28	Q
5	2	Pavel Ivashko	Russia	46.45	Q
6	1	Sajjad Hashemiahangari	Iran	46.46	q
7	2	Kacper Kozłowski	Poland	46.66	
8	3	Ahmed Mubarak Salah	Oman	46.76	Q
9	3	Mehdi Zamani	Iran	46.83	Q
10	2	Alberth Bravo	Venezuela	46.97	
11	3	Mohammad Anas Yahiya	India	46.98	
12	3	Alphas Kishoyian	Kenya	46.98	
13	3	Kasun Kalhar Kankanamlage	Sri Lanka	47.06	
14	2	Silvan Lutz	Switzerland	47.10	
15	1	Łukasz Krawczuk	Poland	47.33	
16	3	Dilip Ruwan Herath Mudiyanselage	Sri Lanka	47.49	
17	2	Kim Gwang-yeol	South Korea	47.57	
18	2	Deverne Charles	Trinidad and Tobago	47.78	
19	2	Othman Al-Busaidi	Oman	47.94	
20	1	Yon Manuel Soriano Carty	Dominican Republic	48.01	
21	1	Daniele Angelella	Switzerland	48.04	
22	3	Stefan Vukadinović	Serbia	48.38	
23	1	Mohamed Elnour Mohamed	Qatar	48.55	
24	3	Hugo Balduíno de Sousa	Brazil	49.58	

=== Final ===
Rank	Lane	Name	Nationality	Time	Notes
1st place, gold medalist(s)	4	Yousef Masrahi	Saudi Arabia	45.18	CR
2nd place, silver medalist(s)	6	Arokia Rajiv	India	45.57	
3rd place, bronze medalist(s)	3	Abubakar Abbas	Bahrain	45.73	
4	8	Pavel Ivashko	Russia	45.93	
5	1	Yavuz Can	Turkey	46.13	
6	2	Sajjad Hashemiahangari	Iran	46.44	
7	7	Mehdi Zamani	Iran	46.54	
8	5	Ahmed Mubarak Salah	Oman	46.82	
