= Track and field at the 2015 Military World Games – Men's 4 × 400 metres relay =

The men's 4 × 400 metres relay event at the 2015 Military World Games was held on 7 and 8 October at the KAFAC Sports Complex.

== Records ==
Prior to this competition, the existing world and CISM record were as follows:

World Record	United States (Andrew Valmon, Quincy Watts, Butch Reynolds, Michael Johnson)	2:54.29	Stuttgart, Germany	22 August 1993
CISM World Record	Poland (Marcin Jędrusiński, Piotr Rysiukiewicz, Jacek Bocian, Robert Maćkowiak)	3:02.78	Zagreb, Croatia	August 1999

== Schedule ==
Date	Time	Round
7 October 2015	11:55	Round 1
8 October 2015	16:10	Final

== Medalists ==
Gold	Silver	Bronze
Russia; Timofey Chalyy; Denis Alekseyev; Ivan Shablyuev; Pavel Ivashko	Algeria; Miloud Laredj; Soufiane Bouhadda; Larbi Bourrada; Abdelmalik Lahoulou	Venezuela; Arturo Ramírez; Alberth Bravo; José Meléndez; Freddy Mezones

== Results ==
=== Round 1 ===
Qualification: First 2 in each heat (Q) and next 2 fastest (q) qualified for the semifinals.

Rank	Heat	Nation	Name	Time	Notes
1	1	Poland	Marcin Marciniszyn, Kacper Kozlowski, Łukasz Krawczuk, Jakub Krzewina	3:05.43	Q
2	1	Algeria	Miloud Laredj, Soufiane Bouhadda, Larbi Bourrada, Abdelmalik Lahoulou	3:05.64	Q
3	1	Venezuela	Arturo Ramírez, Víctor Solarte, José Meléndez, Freddy Mezones	3:05.86	q
4	1	India	Vijayakumaran Sajin, Sumit Kumar, Mohammad Anas Yahiya, Arokia Rajiv	3:06.21	q
5	3	Russia	Timofey Chalyy, Denis Alekseyev, Ivan Shablyuev, Pavel Ivashko	3:06.55	Q
6	2	Sri Lanka	Dilip Ruwan Herath Mudiyanselage, Anjana Yapa Mudiyanselage Welege, Ajith Premakumara Millagaha Gedara, Kasun Kalhar S. Kankanamlage	3:07.71	Q
7	2	Brazil	Alexander Russo, Hederson Estefani, Pedro Luiz Burmann, Hugo de Sousa	3:07.87	Q
8	2	Qatar	Mohamed Elnour Mohamed, Abubaker Haydar Abdalla, Jamal Hairane, Gamal Abdelnasir Abubaker	3:08.39	
9	2	Switzerland	Silvan Lutz, Daniele Angelella, Andreas Ritz, Joel Burgunder	3:08.57	
10	3	Oman	Yousuf Al-Omrani, Othman Al-Busaidi, Ahmed Al-Marjibi, Ahmed Mubarak Salah	3:10.76	Q
11	1	Trinidad and Tobago	Deverne Charles, Anika Prince, Kendis Bullard, Kevin Haynes	3:13.79	
12	2	Dominican Republic	Juander Santos, Leonel Bonon, Joel Mejia, Máximo Mercedes	3:14.45	
13	3	South Korea	Eum Su Hyun, Bong-Soo Kim, Chong Myung Jang, Sung Yun Back	3:17.01	
14	2	Canada	Vincent Duguay, Alex Tourigny-Plante, Joseph Boland, Matthew Setlack	3:30.40	
	3	Bahrain	Ali Khamis, Jonathan Kipkosgei, Linus Kiplagat, Abubakar Abbas	DQ	R170.8
	3	Kenya	Boniface Mucheru Tumuti, Vincent Mumo Kiilu, William Mbevi Mutunga, Alphas Kishoyian	DQ	R170.8
	1	United States	Anton Graphenreed, Dakota Porter, Kyle Wayne Martin, Ricardo Henry	DQ	R163.3
	1	Saudi Arabia	Mazen Alyasen, Ali Alderaan, Abdullah Al Salhi, Abdullah Ahmed Abkar	DNS	

=== Final ===
Rank	Lane	Nation	Name	Time	Notes
1st place, gold medalist(s)	5	Russia	Timofey Chalyy, Denis Alekseyev, Ivan Shablyuev, Pavel Ivashko	3:03.01	
2nd place, silver medalist(s)	6	Algeria	Miloud Laredj, Soufiane Bouhadda, Larbi Bourrada, Abdelmalik Lahoulou	3:03.78	
3rd place, bronze medalist(s)	1	Venezuela	Arturo Ramírez, Alberth Bravo, José Meléndez, Freddy Mezones	3:04.10	
4	3	Poland	Marcin Marciniszyn, Kacper Kozlowski, Łukasz Krawczuk, Jakub Krzewina	3:04.25	
5	2	India	Vijayakumaran Sajin, Mohammad Anas Yahiya, Sumit Kumar, Arokia Rajiv	3:05.34	
6	4	Sri Lanka	Dilip Ruwan Herath Mudiyanselage, Anjana Yapa Mudiyanselage Welege, Ajith Premakumara Millagaha Gedara, Kasun Kalhar S. Kankanamlage	3:08.65	
7	8	Oman	Ahmed Al-Marjibi, Othman Al-Busaidi, Yousuf Al-Omrani, Ahmed Mubarak Salah	3:10.24	
8	7	Brazil	Alexander Russo, Hederson Estefani, Higor Alves, Hugo de Sousa	3:12.96	
