= 2017 Asian Athletics Championships – Men's 400 metres =

The men's 400 metres at the 2017 Asian Athletics Championships was held on 6 and 7 July.

== Medalists ==
Gold	Muhammed Anas Yahiya; India
Silver	Arokia Rajiv; India
Bronze	Ahmed Mubarak Salah; Oman

== Results ==
=== Heats ===
Qualification rule: First 3 in each heat (Q) and the next 4 fastest (q) qualified for the semifinals.

Rank	Heat	Name	Nationality	Time	Notes
1	2	Arokia Rajiv	India	46.41	Q
2	4	Ahmed Mubarak Salah	Oman	46.51	Q
3	1	Dilip Ruwan	Sri Lanka	46.58	Q
4	4	Ismail Mohamed Al-Sabyani	Saudi Arabia	46.60	Q
5	1	Muhammed Anas Yahiya	India	46.70	Q
6	4	Quách Công Lịch	Vietnam	46.79	Q
7	2	Ajith Premakumara	Sri Lanka	46.82	Q
8	3	Amoj Jacob	India	47.09	Q
9	3	Ali Khadivar	Iran	47.30	Q
10	1	Abdallah Djimet Al-Souleymei	Saudi Arabia	47.34	Q
11	3	Othman Al-Busaidi	Oman	47.36	Q
12	4	Badrul Hisyam Abdul Manap	Malaysia	47.48	q
13	1	Nokar Hussain	Pakistan	47.86	q
14	4	Mo Il-hwan	South Korea	47.92	q
15	4	Lei Zhenhui	China	47.99	q
16	3	Apisit Chamsri	Thailand	48.21	
17	2	Abdulaziz Qarainais	Kuwait	48.31	Q
18	1	Davron Atabaev	Tajikistan	48.54	
19	4	Andrey Sokolov	Kazakhstan	48.57	
20	3	Grigoriy Derepaskin	Tajikistan	49.03	
21	3	Muhammad Azam Masri	Malaysia	49.04	
22	2	Abdelrahman Abu Al-Hummos	Jordan	49.08	
23	1	Kumal Som Bahadur	Nepal	49.20	
24	3	Hassan Mansour	Lebanon	49.35	
25	1	Kirill Sarasov	Kyrgyzstan	49.55	
26	2	Mazhar Ali	Pakistan	50.09	
27	4	Ahmed Ali	Maldives	52.71	
28	1	Jantsandorj Ganbold	Mongolia	53.08	
29	2	Antonio Lopes	Timor-Leste	53.76	
	2	Mohamed Nasir Abbas	Qatar	DNS	
	2	Ali Khamis	Bahrain	DNS	
	3	Han Nu-ri	South Korea	DNS	

=== Semifinals ===
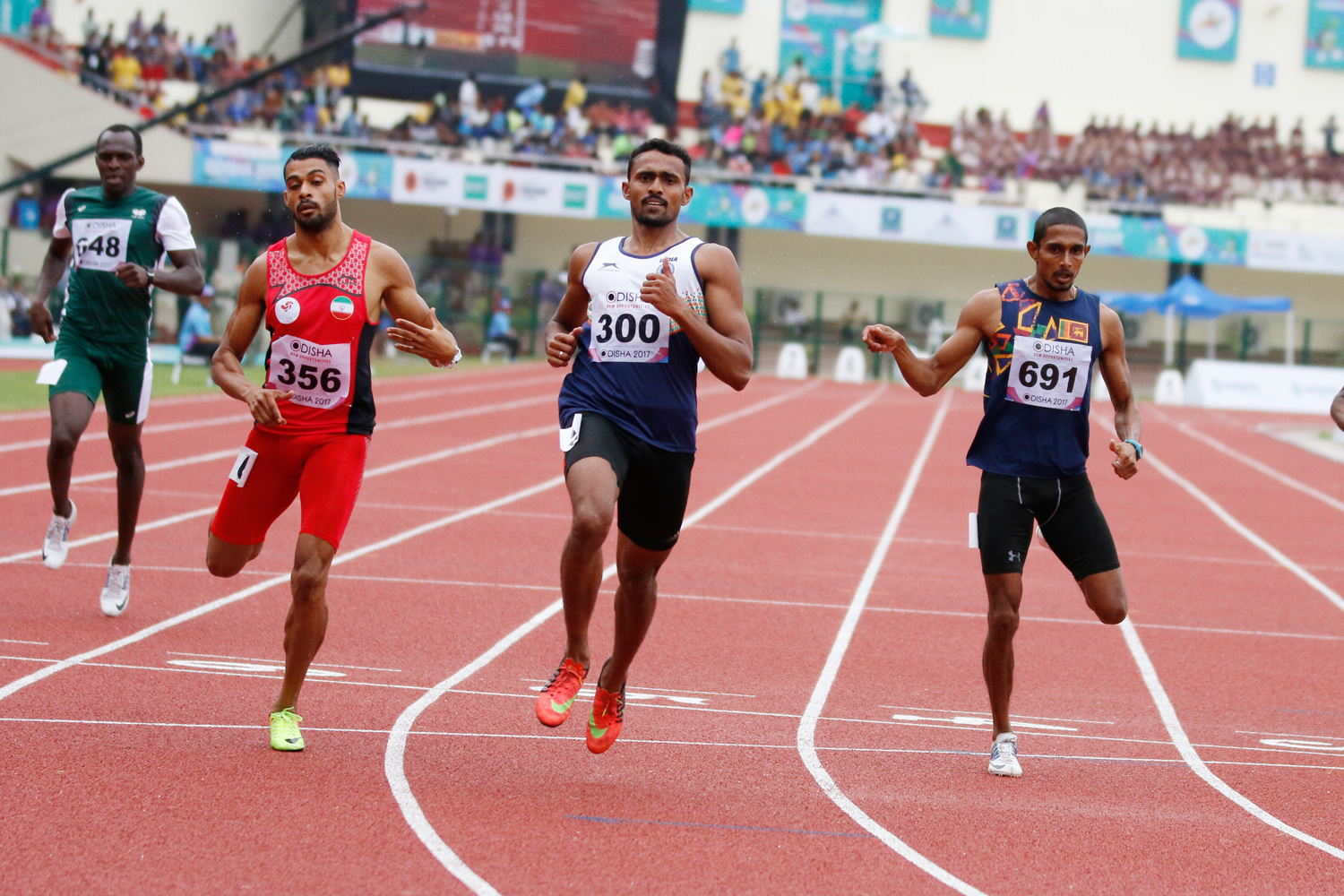
Semifinal 1

Qualification rule: First 3 in each semifinal (Q) and the next 2 fastest (q) qualified for the final.

Rank	Heat	Name	Nationality	Time	Notes
1	1	Muhammed Anas Yahiya	India	46.15	Q
2	1	Ali Khadivar	Iran	46.24	Q
3	2	Quách Công Lịch	Vietnam	46.35	Q
4	2	Ajith Premakumara	Sri Lanka	46.36	Q
5	2	Amoj Jacob	India	46.40	Q
6	1	Dilip Ruwan	Sri Lanka	46.41	Q
6	2	Arokia Rajiv	India	46.41	q
8	1	Ahmed Mubarak Salah	Oman	46.80	q
9	1	Abdallah Djimet Al-Souleymei	Saudi Arabia	47.15	
10	2	Ismail Mohamed Al-Sabyani	Saudi Arabia	47.21	
11	2	Badrul Hisyam Abdul Manap	Malaysia	47.46	
12	1	Mo Il-hwan	South Korea	47.70	
13	1	Othman Al-Busaidi	Oman	47.74	
14	1	Nokar Hussain	Pakistan	47.84	
15	2	Lei Zhenhui	China	48.10	
16	2	Abdulaziz Qarainais	Kuwait	48.62	

=== Final ===
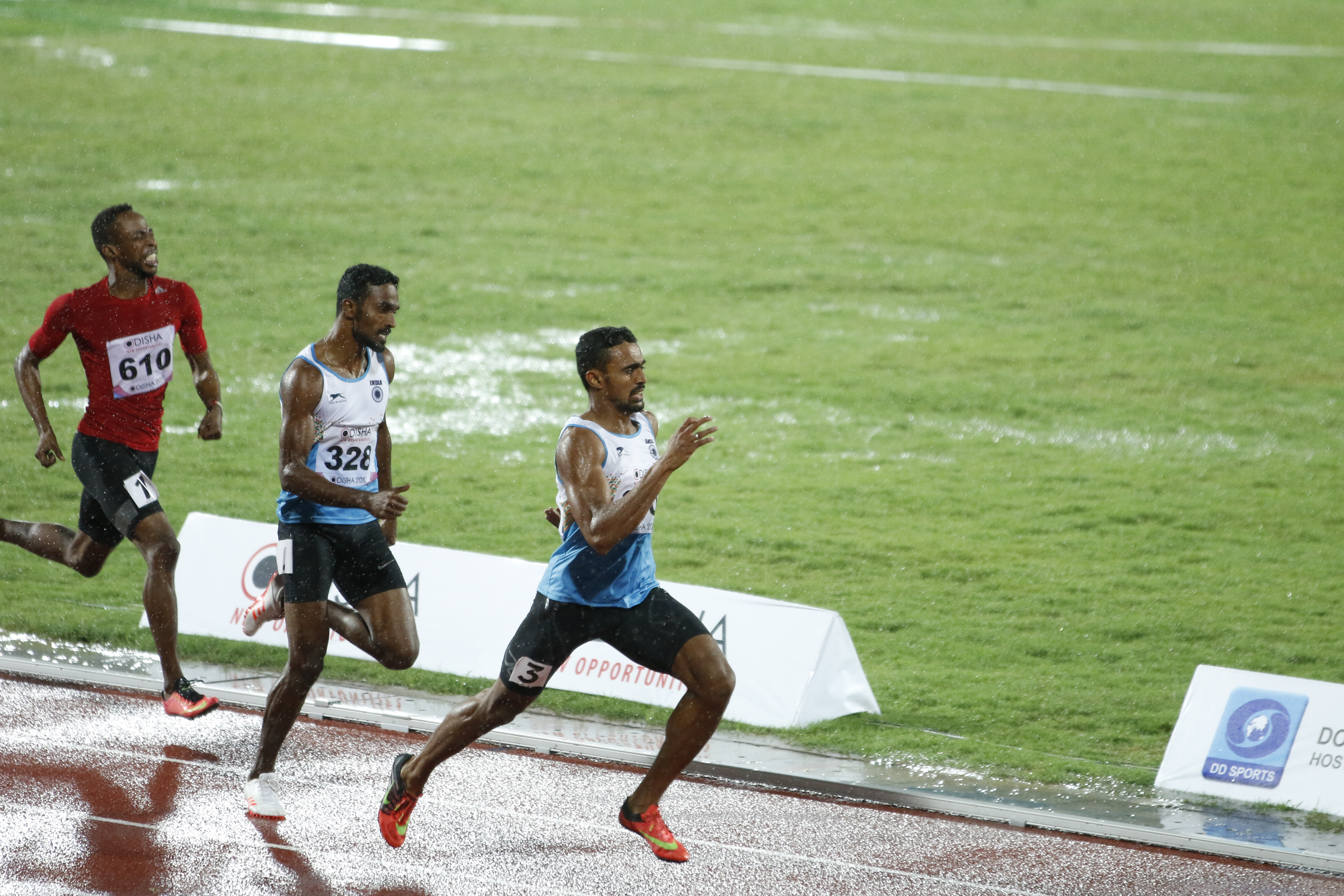
The three medallists finishing

Rank	Lane	Name	Nationality	Time	Notes
1st place, gold medalist(s)	3	Muhammed Anas Yahiya	India	45.77	
2nd place, silver medalist(s)	2	Arokia Rajiv	India	46.14	
3rd place, bronze medalist(s)	1	Ahmed Mubarak Salah	Oman	46.39	
4	7	Amoj Jacob	India	46.49	
5	8	Dilip Ruwan	Sri Lanka	46.50	
6	4	Quách Công Lịch	Vietnam	46.51	
7	5	Ali Khadivar	Iran	46.95	
8	6	Ajith Premakumara	Sri Lanka	47.35	
