= Athletics at the 2018 Asian Games – Men's 400 metres =

Men's 400 metres at the 2018 Asian Games
- Venue: Gelora Bung Karno Stadium
- Date: 25–26 August 2018
- Competitors: 29 from 19 nations

Medalists
gold medal	Abdalelah Haroun	Qatar
silver medal	Muhammed Anas	India
bronze medal	Ali Khamis	Bahrain

The men's 400 metres competition at the 2018 Asian Games took place on 25 and 26 August 2018 at the Gelora Bung Karno Stadium.

== Schedule ==
All times are Western Indonesia Time (UTC+07:00)

Date	Time	Event
Saturday, 25 August 2018	11:10	Round 1
Saturday, 25 August 2018	20:45	Semifinals
Sunday, 26 August 2018	19:10	Final

== Records ==
Prior to this competition, the existing world, Asian and Games records were as follows.

World Record	Wayde van Niekerk (RSA)	43.03	Rio de Janeiro, Brazil	14 August 2016
Asian Record	Yousef Masrahi (KSA)	43.93	Beijing, China	23 August 2015
Games Record	Yousef Masrahi (KSA)	44.46	Incheon, South Korea	28 September 2014

== Results ==
Legend

- DNF — Did not finish
- DNS — Did not start

=== Round 1 ===
- Qualification: First 4 in each heat (Q) and the next 4 fastest (q) advance to the semifinals.

==== Heat 1 ====
Rank	Athlete	Time	Notes
1	Muhammed Anas (IND)	45.63	Q
2	Mohamed Nasir Abbas (QAT)	45.81	Q
3	Kalinga Kumarage (SRI)	45.99	Q
4	Umar Wira (INA)	48.00	Q
5	Grigoriy Derepaskin (TJK)	49.00	q
—	Ali Khadivar (IRI)	DNF	

==== Heat 2 ====
Rank	Athlete	Time	Notes
1	Mikhail Litvin (KAZ)	46.43	Q
2	Yang Lei (CHN)	47.55	Q
3	Muhammad Nadeem (PAK)	49.19	Q
4	Phitchaya Sunthonthuam (THA)	49.71	Q
5	Ifan Anugrah Setiawan (INA)	50.34	
6	Mohamed Abu Taleb (BAN)	50.97	

==== Heat 3 ====
Rank	Athlete	Time	Notes
1	Abbas Abubakar Abbas (BRN)	46.07	Q
2	Julian Walsh (JPN)	46.20	Q
3	Zubin Muncherji (SGP)	47.25	Q
4	Yang Lung-hsiang (TPE)	47.49	Q
5	Erdenebatyn Turtogtokh (MGL)	50.23	

==== Heat 4 ====
Rank	Athlete	Time	Notes
1	Abdalelah Haroun (QAT)	46.28	Q
2	Arokia Rajiv (IND)	46.82	Q
3	Mo Il-hwan (KOR)	47.34	Q
4	Trenten Beram (PHI)	48.06	Q
5	Davron Atabaev (TJK)	48.37	q
6	Yanakorn Munrot (THA)	49.06	q

==== Heat 5 ====
Rank	Athlete	Time	Notes
1	Aruna Darshana (SRI)	46.97	Q
2	Ali Khamis (BRN)	47.41	Q
3	Andrey Sokolov (KAZ)	48.26	Q
4	Trần Đình Sơn (VIE)	48.97	Q
5	Nokar Hussain (PAK)	49.75	q
6	Asyeikhany Akhyt (MGL)	51.22	

=== Semifinals ===
- Qualification: First 2 in each heat (Q) and the next 2 fastest (q) advance to the final.

==== Heat 1 ====
Rank	Athlete	Time	Notes
1	Abbas Abubakar Abbas (BRN)	45.59	Q
2	Arokia Rajiv (IND)	46.08	Q
3	Aruna Darshana (SRI)	46.53	
4	Zubin Muncherji (SGP)	47.88	
5	Umar Wira (INA)	48.57	
6	Andrey Sokolov (KAZ)	48.60	
7	Grigoriy Derepaskin (TJK)	48.84	
8	Phitchaya Sunthonthuam (THA)	48.97	

==== Heat 2 ====
Rank	Athlete	Time	Notes
1	Muhammed Anas (IND)	45.30	Q
2	Julian Walsh (JPN)	46.01	Q
3	Kalinga Kumarage (SRI)	46.21	q
4	Mohamed Nasir Abbas (QAT)	46.33	
5	Mo Il-hwan (KOR)	46.73	
6	Trần Đình Sơn (VIE)	46.96	
7	Trenten Beram (PHI)	47.34	
—	Nokar Hussain (PAK)	DNS	

==== Heat 3 ====
Rank	Athlete	Time	Notes
1	Abdalelah Haroun (QAT)	45.83	Q
2	Ali Khamis (BRN)	46.07	Q
3	Mikhail Litvin (KAZ)	46.12	q
4	Yang Lung-hsiang (TPE)	47.37	
5	Davron Atabaev (TJK)	48.89	
6	Yanakorn Munrot (THA)	48.96	
7	Muhammad Nadeem (PAK)	48.97	
8	Yang Lei (CHN)	49.25	

=== Final ===
Rank	Athlete	Time	Notes
1st place, gold medalist(s)	Abdalelah Haroun (QAT)	44.89	
2nd place, silver medalist(s)	Muhammed Anas (IND)	45.69	
3rd place, bronze medalist(s)	Ali Khamis (BRN)	45.70	
4	Arokia Rajiv (IND)	45.84	
5	Julian Walsh (JPN)	45.89	
6	Mikhail Litvin (KAZ)	46.17	
7	Abbas Abubakar Abbas (BRN)	46.41	
8	Kalinga Kumarage (SRI)	46.49	
