= Mohamed Obaid Al-Saadi =

Omani sprinter

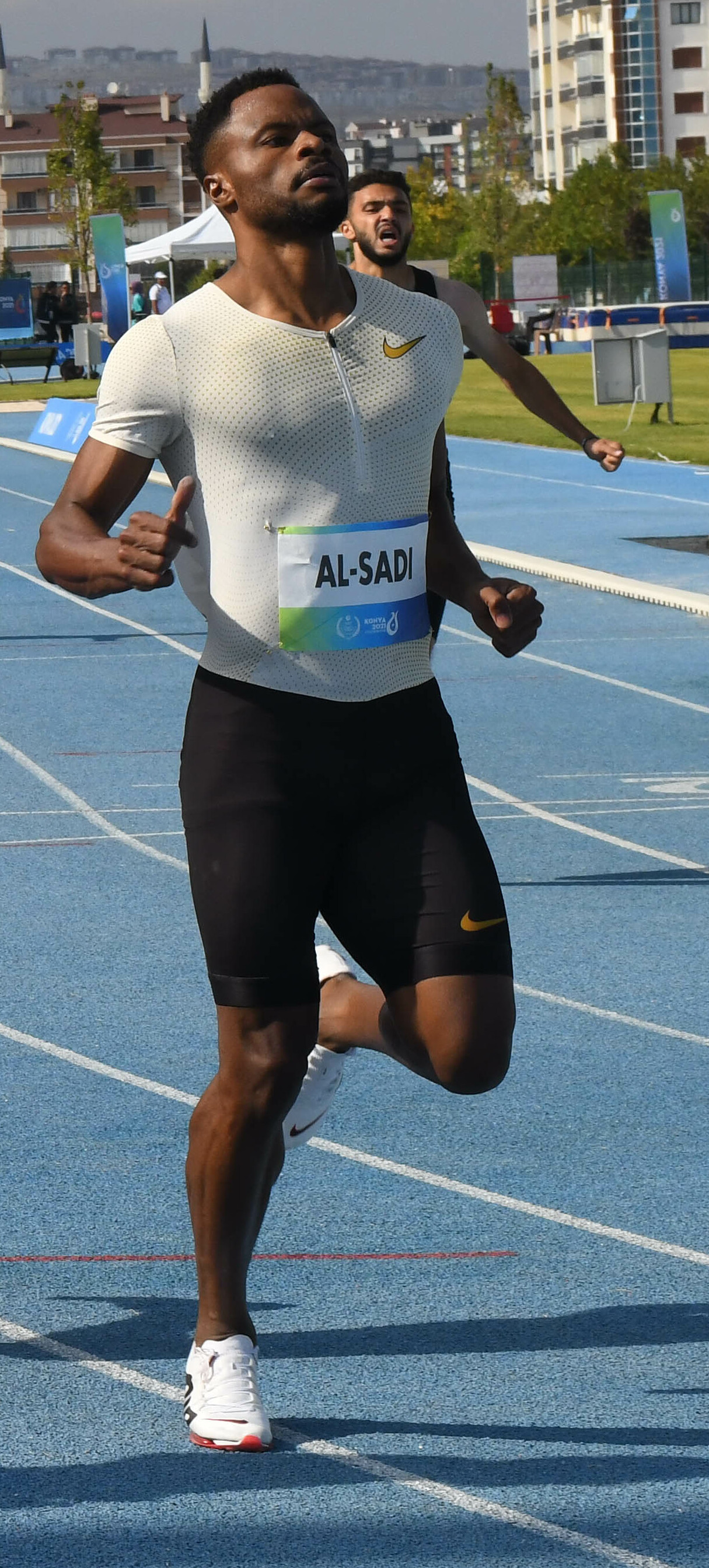
- Mohamed Obaid Al-Saadi in 2022

Personal information
- Born: 24 February 1994 (age 32)

Sport
- Sport: Athletics
- Events: 200 m, 400 m

Mohamed Obaid Hindi Al-Saadi (born 24 February 1994) is an Omani sprinter competing primarily in the 200 metres. He represented his country at the 2017 World Championships without advancing from the first round.

== International competitions ==
Year	Competition	Venue	Position	Event	Notes
Representing Oman
2013	Islamic Solidarity Games	Palembang, Indonesia	1st	4 × 100 m relay	39.72
2014	Asian Indoor Championships	Hangzhou, China	9th (h)	400 m	49.02
2014	Asian Games	Incheon, South Korea	19th (h)	400 m	47.96
2014	Asian Games	Incheon, South Korea	6th	4 × 400 m relay	3:07.71
2015	Asian Championships	Wuhan, China	19th (h)	400 m	48.10
2015	Asian Championships	Wuhan, China	7th	4 × 100 m relay	39.75
2015	Asian Championships	Wuhan, China	6th	4 × 400 m relay	3:05.94
2015	Military World Games	Mungyeong, South Korea	15th (sf)	200 m	21.36
2015	Military World Games	Mungyeong, South Korea	6th	4 × 100 m relay	39.81
2017	Islamic Solidarity Games	Baku, Azerbaijan	5th	4 × 100 m relay	40.37
2017	Islamic Solidarity Games	Baku, Azerbaijan	3rd	4 × 400 m relay	3:08.94
2017	Asian Championships	Bhubaneswar, India	15th (sf)	400 m	21.93
2017	Asian Championships	Bhubaneswar, India	9th (h)	4 × 100 m relay	41.08
2017	Asian Championships	Bhubaneswar, India	5th	4 × 400 m relay	3:06.79
2017	Arab Championships	Radès, Tunisia	3rd	200 m	21.12
2017	Arab Championships	Radès, Tunisia	2nd	4 × 100 m relay	40.64
2017	Arab Championships	Radès, Tunisia	2nd	4 × 400 m relay	3:08.82
2017	World Championships	London, United Kingdom	43rd (h)	200 m	21.50
2018	West Asian Championships	Amman, Jordan	3rd	200 m	21.09
2018	Asian Games	Jakarta, Indonesia	7th	200 m	20.81
2018	Asian Games	Jakarta, Indonesia	11th (h)	4 × 100 m relay	39.76
2019	Arab Championships	Cairo, Egypt	5th	200 m	21.07
2019	Arab Championships	Cairo, Egypt	3rd	4 × 100 m relay	40.22
2019	Asian Championships	Doha, Qatar	7th (sf)	200 m	20.86^{1}
2019	Asian Championships	Doha, Qatar	3rd	4 × 100 m relay	39.36
2021	Arab Championships	Radès, Tunisia	10th (h)	200 m	21.88
2021	Arab Championships	Radès, Tunisia	2nd	4 × 100 m relay	39.95
2022	GCC Games	Kuwait City, Kuwait	4th	200 m	21.19
2022	GCC Games	Kuwait City, Kuwait	2nd	4 × 100 m relay	39.72
2022	Islamic Solidarity Games	Konya, Turkey	–	200 m	DQ
2022	Islamic Solidarity Games	Konya, Turkey	3rd	4 × 100 m relay	39.21
2023	Arab Championships	Marrakesh, Morocco	2nd	200 m	20.62
2023	West Asian Championships	Doha, Qatar	5th	200 m	21.39
2023	West Asian Championships	Doha, Qatar	1st	4 × 100 m relay	39.43
2023	Arab Games	Oran, Algeria	2nd	200 m	20.94
2023	Arab Games	Oran, Algeria	1st	4 × 100 m relay	39.70
2023	Asian Championships	Bangkok, Thailand	10th (sf)	200 m	21.08
2023	Asian Championships	Bangkok, Thailand	5th	4 × 100 m relay	39.17
2023	World Championships	Budapest, Hungary	51st (h)	200 m	21.39
2023	Asian Games	Hangzhou, China	12th (sf)	200 m	21.32
2023	Asian Games	Hangzhou, China	–	4 × 100 m relay	DQ
2024	West Asian Championships	Basra, Iraq	3rd	200 m	21.01
2024	West Asian Championships	Basra, Iraq	1st	4 × 100 m relay	39.78
2025	Islamic Solidarity Games	Riyadh, Saudi Arabia	2nd	4 × 100 m relay	39.21

^{1}Did not start in the final

== Personal bests ==
Outdoor

- 100 metres – 10.64 (+0.4 m/s, Mobile 2017)
- 200 metres – 21.02 (+1.4 m/s, Doha 2015)
- 400 metres – 47.09 (Doha 2015)
