= Athletics at the 2017 Islamic Solidarity Games =

Athletics competition

Athletics at the 4th Islamic Solidarity Games
- Host stadium in Baku.
- Dates: 16–20 May 2017
- Host city: Baku, Azerbaijan
- Venue: Baku National Stadium
- Events: 54
- Participation: 428 athletes from 47 nations

The athletics competition at the 2017 Islamic Solidarity Games was held in Baku National Stadium in Baku, Azerbaijan from 16 to 20 May 2017.

== Medal table ==
* Host nation (Azerbaijan)

Rank	Nation	Gold	Silver	Bronze	Total
1	Bahrain	11	5	3	19
2	Azerbaijan*	10	4	4	18
3	Turkey	8	10	5	23
4	Morocco	7	3	8	18
5	Iran	3	7	6	16
6	Uzbekistan	3	3	3	9
7	Saudi Arabia	2	1	1	4
8	Algeria	1	2	3	6
9	Cameroon	1	1	2	4
10	Qatar	1	1	1	3
11	Gambia	1	1	0	2
11	Senegal	1	1	0	2
13	Benin	1	0	1	2
13	Iraq	1	0	1	2
13	Mozambique	1	0	1	2
16	Guinea-Bissau	1	0	0	1
16	Syria	1	0	0	1
18	Indonesia	0	4	0	4
19	Nigeria	0	3	1	4
20	Tunisia	0	2	1	3
21	Guyana	0	1	2	3
22	Djibouti	0	1	1	2
22	Pakistan	0	1	1	2
22	Suriname	0	1	1	2
25	Jordan	0	1	0	1
25	Uganda	0	1	0	1
27	Oman	0	0	2	2
28	Egypt	0	0	1	1
28	Ivory Coast	0	0	1	1
28	Kyrgyzstan	0	0	1	1
28	Malaysia	0	0	1	1
28	United Arab Emirates	0	0	1	1
Totals (32 entries)		54	54	53	161

== Medal summary ==
=== Men ===
Event	Gold		Silver		Bronze	
100 m	Ramil Guliyev; Turkey	10.06 GR, PB	Andrew Fisher; Bahrain	10.16	Barakat Al-Harthi; Oman	10.35
200 m	Ramil Guliyev; Turkey	20.08 GR	Salem Eid Yaqoob; Bahrain	20.56	Winston George; Guyana	20.62
400 m	Ali Khamis; Bahrain	45.54	Winston George; Guyana	45.69	Ali Khadivar; Iran	45.92
800 m	Mostafa Smaili; Morocco	1:45.78	Riadh Chninni; Tunisia	1:46.24	Amine Belferar; Algeria	1:46.44
1500 m	Sadik Mikhou; Bahrain	3:36.64 GR	Fouad Elkaam; Morocco	3:37.81	Brahim Kaazouzi; Morocco	3:38.24
5000 m	Younès Essalhi; Morocco	13:27.64 GR	Soufiyan Bouqantar; Morocco	13:28.69	Mohamed Ismail Ibrahim; Djibouti	13:29.29 PB
10000 m	Abraham Cheroben; Bahrain	27:38.76 GR	Kaan Kigen Özbilen; Turkey	27:41.99	Soufiyan Bouqantar; Morocco	27:47.59 PB
110 m hurdles	Ahmed Al-Muwallad; Saudi Arabia	13.68 GR	Rahib Məmmədov; Azerbaijan	14.18	Mohammed Sad Al-Khfaji; Iraq	14.20
400 m hurdles	Creve Armando Machava; Mozambique	50.73	Amadou Ndiaye; Senegal	50.94	Kurt Couto; Mozambique	50.97
3000 m steeplechase	Mohamed Tindouf; Morocco	8:26.26 GR, PB	Mohamed Ismail Ibrahim; Djibouti	8:31.59	Aras Kaya; Turkey	8:32.68
4 × 100 m relay	Bahrain; Saeed Alkhadli; Salem Eid Yaqoob; Musa Isah; Andrew Fisher	39.55 GR, NR	Turkey; Yiğitcan Hekimoğlu; İzzet Safer; Emre Zafer Barnes; Ramil Guliyev	39.56	Ivory Coast; Thierry Konan; Émilien Tchan Bi Chan; Jean-Marc Allokoua; Arthur Cissé	39.82
4 × 400 m relay	Turkey; Enis Ünsal; Batuhan Altıntaş; Sinan Ören; Yavuz Can	3:06.83	Pakistan; Asad Iqbal; Umar Sadaat; Nokar Hussain; Mehboob Ali	3:07.62	Oman; Salad Al-Ajmi; Mohamed Obaid Al-Saadi; Usama Al-Gheilani; Ahmed Mubarak Al-Saadi	3:08.94
High jump	Majd Eddin Ghazal; Syria	2.28 m GR	Hamdi Ali; Qatar	2.26 m PB	Keivan Ghanbarzadeh; Iran	2.24 m
Pole vault	Hussain Al-Hizam; Saudi Arabia	5.55 m GR	Mohamed Amine Romdhane; Tunisia	5.30 m	Hichem Khalil Cherabi; Algeria	5.25 m
Long jump	Yahya Berrabah; Morocco	8.07 m	Miguel van Assen; Suriname	7.63 m	Mouhcine Khoua; Morocco	7.62 m
Triple jump	Nazim Babayev; Azerbaijan	17.15 m GR, PB	Alexis Copello; Azerbaijan	16.90 m	Miguel van Assen; Suriname	16.64 m NR
Shot put	Osman Can Özdeveci; Turkey	19.83 m GR	Sultan Al-Hebshi; Saudi Arabia	19.56 m	Sergey Dementev; Uzbekistan	18.56 m
Discus throw	Mustafa Kadhim; Iraq	60.89 m NR	Ehsan Haddadi; Iran	60.54 m	Sultan Al-Dawoodi; Saudi Arabia	58.63 m
Hammer throw	Eşref Apak; Turkey	74.32 m	Özkan Baltacı; Turkey	74.13 m	Ashraf Amgad El-Seify; Qatar	73.17 m
Javelin throw	Ahmed Bader Magour; Qatar	83.45 m GR	Ivan Zaytsev; Uzbekistan	78.66 m	Arshad Nadeem; Pakistan	76.33 m

=== Women ===
Event	Gold		Silver		Bronze	
100 m	Gina Bass; Gambia	11.56	Nigina Sharipova; Uzbekistan	11.65	Mizgin Ay; Turkey	11.71 PB
200 m	Edidiong Odiong; Bahrain	22.95 GR	Gina Bass; Gambia	23.15	Nigina Sharipova; Uzbekistan	23.66
400 m	Salwa Eid Naser; Bahrain	51.33 GR	Kemi Adekoya; Bahrain	51.81	Yinka Ajayi; Nigeria	52.57
800 m	Malika Akkaoui; Morocco	2:01.04 GR	Halimah Nakaayi; Uganda	2:01.60	Noélie Yarigo; Benin	2:02.47
1500 m	Rababe Arafi; Morocco	4:18.82 GR	Meryem Akda; Turkey	4:19.91	Amina Bettiche; Algeria	4:21.29
5000 m	Ruth Jebet; Bahrain	14:53.41 GR, PB	Yasemin Can; Turkey	14:53.50	Darya Maslova; Kyrgyzstan	15:00.42 NR
10000 m	Yasemin Can; Turkey	31:18.20 GR	Rose Chelimo; Bahrain	31:37.81	Alia Mohammed; United Arab Emirates	31:49.01
100 m hurdles	Odile Ahouanwanou; Benin	13.55 NR	Nevin Yanıt; Turkey	13.71	Raja Nursheena Azhar; Malaysia	13.85
400 m hurdles	Oluwakemi Adekoya; Bahrain	54.68 GR	Glory Onome Nathaniel; Nigeria	55.90 PB	Aminat Yusuf Jamal; Bahrain	56.90 PB
3000 m steeplechase	Ruth Jebet; Bahrain	9:15.41 GR	Amina Bettiche; Algeria	9:25.90 NR	Tigest Mekonen; Bahrain	9:26.00
4 × 100 m relay	Bahrain; Salwa Eid Naser; Iman Essa Jasim; Edidiong Odiong; Hajar Al-Khaldi	44.98 GR, NR	Nigeria; Glory Onome Nathaniel; Rita Ossai; Folashade Abugan; Yinka Ajayi	46.20	Cameroon; Germaine Abessolo Bivina; Marie Gisèle Eleme Asse; Charifa Labarang; Marlyne Sarah Ngongoa	46.78
4 × 400 m relay	Bahrain; Salwa Eid Naser; Edidiong Odiong; Aminat Yusuf Jamal; Kemi Adekoya	3:32.96 GR	Nigeria; Rita Ossai; Glory Onome Nathaniel; Folashade Abugan; Yinka Ajayi	3:34.47	Turkey; Mizgin Ay; Elif Yıldırım; Büşra Yıldırım; Meryem Akdağ	3:41.29
High jump	Nadiya Dusanova; Uzbekistan	1.80 m =GR	Yousra Araar; Algeria	1.77 m	Natrena Hooper; Guyana	1.77 m
Pole vault	Buse Arıkazan; Turkey	4.15 m GR	Demet Parlak; Turkey	4.15 m	Syrine Balti; Tunisia	4.00 m
Long jump	Roumeissa Belabiod; Algeria	6.33 m GR	Maria Natalia Londa; Indonesia	6.30 m	Marlyne Sarah Ngongoa; Cameroon	6.06 m
Triple jump	Sangoné Kandji; Senegal	13.05 m PB	Joëlle Mbumi Nkouindjin; Cameroon	12.84 m	Yekaterina Sarıyeva; Azerbaijan	12.81 m
Shot put	Auriol Dongmo; Cameroon	17.75 m GR	Emel Dereli; Turkey	17.62 m	Noora Salem Jasim; Bahrain	17.02 m
Discus throw	Jessica Inchude; Guinea-Bissau	50.23 m	Noora Salem Jasim; Bahrain	50.12 m NR	Amina Moudden; Morocco	49.56 m
Hammer throw	Hanna Skydan; Azerbaijan	75.29 m GR, NR	Kıvılcım Kaya Salman; Turkey	67.41 m	Soukaina Zakkour; Morocco	63.10 m PB
Javelin throw	Eda Tuğsuz; Turkey	67.21 m GR, NR	Sahar Ziaeisisakht; Iran	49.15 m PB	Berivan Şakır; Turkey	48.74 m

=== Para Athletics Men ===
Event	Gold		Silver		Bronze	
100 m T11	Nurlan Ibrahimov; Guide: Vadim Ryabchin; Azerbaijan	11.60	Elchin Muradov; Guide: Hakim Ibrahimov; Azerbaijan	11.64	Arash Khosravi; Guide: Javad Marghashi; Iran	11.66
100 m T12	Elmir Jabrayilov; Azerbaijan	10.98	Mansur Abdurashidov; Uzbekistan	11.25	Mahdi Afri; Morocco	11.28
400 m T12	Mahdi Afri; Morocco	49.64	Ayoub Hamouda; Morocco	50.51	Oğuz Akbulut; Turkey	50.73
4 × 100 m relay (T11/T12/T13)	Iran; Arash Khosravi; Vahid Alinajimi; Hossein Saeidi; Amir Khosravani	45.24	Turkey; Oğuz Akbulut; Mehmet Tunç; Suat Öner; Ahkan Cira	46.41	Not awarded	
Long jump T11	Elchin Muradov; Azerbaijan	5.76 m	Abdul Halim Dalimunte; Indonesia	5.28 m	Zeynidin Bilalov; Azerbaijan	5.22 m
Long jump T12	Doniyor Saliev; Uzbekistan	7.12 m	Kamil Aliyev; Azerbaijan	7.10 m	Oleg Panyutin; Azerbaijan	6.78 m
Shot put F12	Saman Pakbaz; Iran	15.69 m	Masoud Heidari; Iran	15.00 m	Elbek Sultonov; Uzbekistan	14.70 m
Shot put F56	Olokhan Musayev; Azerbaijan	11.86 m	Alireza Ghaleh Nasseri; Iran	10.49 m	Ali Mohammad Yari; Iran	10.37 m
Shot put F57	Samir Nabiyev; Azerbaijan	13.95 m	Javid Ehsani Shakib; Iran	13.74 m	Javad Dalakeh; Iran	13.06 m
Discus throw F56	Ali Mohammad Yari; Iran	43.08 m	Alireza Ghaleh Nasseri; Iran	42.70 m	Olokhan Musayev; Azerbaijan	40.49 m
Discus throw F57	Samir Nabiyev; Azerbaijan	45.17 m	Amer Abdelaziz; Jordan	42.08 m	Metawa Abouelkhir; Egypt	41.43 m
Javelin throw F13	Aleksandr Svechnikov; Uzbekistan	70.00 m WR	Sajad Nikparast; Iran	59.24 m	Seyed Er Hosseini Liravi; Iran	55.79 m

=== Para Athletics Women ===
Event	Gold		Silver		Bronze	
100 m T12	Elena Chebanu; Azerbaijan	12.09	Endang Sitorus; Indonesia	12.89	Meryem En-Nourhi; Morocco	15.00
200 m T12	Elena Chebanu; Azerbaijan	24.69	Endang Sitorus; Indonesia	26.73	Meryem En-Nourhi; Morocco	31.29
