= Track and field at the 2015 Military World Games – Men's 200 metres =

The men's 200 metres event at the 2015 Military World Games was held on 7 and 8 October at the KAFAC Sports Complex.

== Records ==
Prior to this competition, the existing world and CISM record were as follows:

World Record	Usain Bolt (JAM)	19.19	Berlin, Germany	20 August 2009
CISM World Record	Femi Seun Ogunode (QAT)	20.46	Rio de Janeiro, Brazil	23 July 2011

== Schedule ==
Date	Time	Round
7 October 2015	10:05; 15:50	Round 1 Semifinals
8 October 2015	13:05	Final

== Medalists ==
Gold	Silver	Bronze
Eseosa Desalu; Italy	Serhiy Smelyk; Ukraine	Aldemir da Silva Júnior; Brazil

== Results ==
=== Round 1 ===
Qualification: First 3 in each heat (Q) and next 6 fastest (q) qualified for the semifinals.

Wind:
Heat 1: -0.6 m/s, Heat 2: +0.4 m/s, Heat 3: +0.7 m/s, Heat 4: -0.2 m/s, Heat 5: -1.3 m/s, Heat 6: -0.7 m/s

Rank	Heat	Name	Nationality	Time	Notes
1	2	Aldemir da Silva Júnior	Brazil	21.06	Q
2	3	Naseib Salmein	United Arab Emirates	21.07	Q
3	6	Eseosa Desalu	Italy	21.10	Q
4	1	Serhiy Smelyk	Ukraine	21.12	Q
5	3	Bruno de Barros	Brazil	21.13	Q
6	4	Mike Mokamba Nyang'au	Kenya	21.15	Q
7	2	Yancarlos Martinez	Dominican Republic	21.18	Q
8	4	Khalid Saleh Al-Ghailani	Oman	21.26	Q
9	1	Salem Eid Yaqoob	Bahrain	21.26	Q
10	1	Kamil Masztak	Poland	21.27	Q
11	4	Reza Ghasemi	Iran	21.31	Q
12	5	Yohandris Andújar	Dominican Republic	21.33	Q
13	5	Arturo Ramirez	Venezuela	21.41	Q
14	5	Matteo Galvan	Italy	21.41	Q
15	6	Mohamed Abdul Rasheed	Sri Lanka	21.42	Q
16	3	Mahdi Zamani	Iran	21.43	Q
17	5	Mohamed Hindi	Oman	21.46	q
18	4	Joel Burgunder	Switzerland	21.53	q
19	2	Samuel Francis	Qatar	21.61	Q
20	6	Tony Kipruto Chirchir	Kenya	21.64	Q
21	1	Fernando Lumain	Indonesia	21.72	q
22	2	Kyongsoo Oh	South Korea	21.79	q
23	3	Gwang-Yeol Kim	South Korea	21.81	q
24	2	Abdullah Ahmed Abkar	Saudi Arabia	21.81	q
25	5	Aziz Ouhadi	Morocco	21.82	
26	1	Liaquat Ali	Pakistan	21.87	
27	1	Tibor Kasa	Hungary	21.89	
28	6	Pascal Mueller	Switzerland	21.91	
29	4	Heryanto Heryanto	Indonesia	22.05	
30	4	Ali Hassan Al Jassim	Qatar	22.10	
31	2	Kevin Haynes	Trinidad and Tobago	22.20	
32	2	Noureddine Hadid	Lebanon	22.26	
33	3	Manuel Smith	United States	22.38	
34	4	Oronde Vassell	United States	22.56	
35	5	Abdourahim Haroun	Chad	22.70	
36	5	Mansour Hassan	Lebanon	22.95	
37	6	Venislav Tsvetelyubov Nikolov	Bulgaria	23.82	
	3	Abubakar Abbas	Bahrain	DNF	
	6	Alessio Antonio Bustos Silva	Chile	DNS	

=== Semifinals ===
Qualification: First 2 in each heat (Q) and next 2 fastest (q) qualified for the final.

Wind:
Heat 1: -0.7 m/s, Heat 2: +0.1 m/s, Heat 3: -0.4 m/s

Rank	Heat	Name	Nationality	Time	Notes
1	3	Eseosa Desalu	Italy	20.71	Q
2	3	Bruno de Barros	Brazil	20.72	Q
3	3	Naseib Salmein	United Arab Emirates	20.73	q
4	3	Yancarlos Martinez	Dominican Republic	20.79	q
5	1	Serhiy Smelyk	Ukraine	20.91	Q
6	2	Aldemir da Silva Júnior	Brazil	20.93	Q
7	1	Mike Mokamba Nyang'au	Kenya	21.01	Q
8	1	Salem Eid Yaqoob	Bahrain	21.06	
9	2	Matteo Galvan	Italy	21.08	Q
10	1	Kamil Masztak	Poland	21.11	
11	1	Khalid Saleh Al-Ghailani	Oman	21.23	
12	2	Yohandris Andújar	Dominican Republic	21.25	
13	2	Mohamed Abdul Rasheed	Sri Lanka	21.29	
14	2	Samuel Francis	Qatar	21.35	
15	2	Mohamed Hindi	Oman	21.36	
16	3	Joel Burgunder	Switzerland	21.82	
17	3	Abdullah Ahmed Abkar	Saudi Arabia	21.89	
18	1	Fernando Lumain	Indonesia	22.08	
19	2	Arturo Ramirez	Venezuela	1:12.41	
	3	Tony Kipruto Chirchir	Kenya	DQ	R163.3
	1	Reza Ghasemi	Iran	DNS	
	2	Gwang-Yeol Kim	South Korea	DNS	
	1	Kyongsoo Oh	South Korea	DNS	
	3	Mahdi Zamani	Iran	DNS	

=== Final ===
Wind: +1.7 m/s

Rank	Lane	Name	Nationality	Time	Notes
1st place, gold medalist(s)	5	Eseosa Desalu	Italy	20.64	
2nd place, silver medalist(s)	3	Serhiy Smelyk	Ukraine	20.74	
3rd place, bronze medalist(s)	4	Aldemir da Silva Júnior	Brazil	20.77	
4	6	Bruno de Barros	Brazil	20.84	
5	2	Yancarlos Martinez	Dominican Republic	20.88	
6	1	Naseib Salmein	United Arab Emirates	21.04	
7	8	Matteo Galvan	Italy	21.09	
8	7	Mike Mokamba Nyang'au	Kenya	21.16	
