= 2015 Asian Athletics Championships – Men's 4 × 400 metres relay =

The men's 4 × 400 metres event at the 2015 Asian Athletics Championships was held on June 7.

== Results ==
| Rank | Nation | Competitors | Time | Notes |
|---|---|---|---|---|
| 1st place, gold medalist(s) | Qatar | Femi Seun Ogunode, Musaeb Abdulrahman Balla, Mohamed El Nour Mohamed, Abdelalelah Haroun | 3:02.50 | CR |
| 2nd place, silver medalist(s) | Saudi Arabia | Mazen Al-Yasen, Mohammed Obaid Al-Salhi, Abdullah Abkar Mohammed, Yousef Masrahi | 3:02.62 | |
| 3rd place, bronze medalist(s) | Japan | Julian Jrummi Walsh, Yuzo Kanemaru, Kazuma Oseto, Takamasa Kitagawa | 3:03.47 | |
| 4 | India | Vijyakumaran Sajin, Ayyasamy Dharun, Sachin Roby, Arokya Rajeev | 3:05.14 | |
| 5 | Sri Lanka | Dilip Mudiyanselage, Anjana Welegedara, Chanaka Gedara, Kalinga Hewakumarage | 3:05.79 | |
| 6 | Oman | Ahmed Al-Marjibi, Othman Al-Busaidi, Mohamed Hindi, Ahmed Mubarak Salah | 3:05.94 | NR |
| 7 | China | Li Xiaolong, Zhu Chenbin, Fang Yuan, Mao Guorong | 3:07.36 | |
| 8 | Hong Kong | Chan Ka Chun, Leung King Hung, Ho Tsz Fung, Fung Kin Lok | 3:14.19 | |
