= Amoj Jacob =

Indian sprinter (born 1998)

Personal information
- Born: 2 May 1998 (age 28) Kochi, Kerala, India
- Education: SGTB Khalsa College
- Occupation: Manager
- Employer: Bank of India
- Height: 1.80 m (5 ft 11 in)

Sport
- Sport: Track and field
- Event: 400 m

Achievements and titles
- Personal best: 45.68 (2021)
Medal record
Men's athletics
Representing India
Asian Games
Gold medal – first place	2022 Hangzhou	4×400m
Asian Championships
Gold medal – first place	2017 Bhubaneshwar	4×400m
Gold medal – first place	2023 Bangkok	4×400m mixed
Silver medal – second place	2023 Bangkok	4×400m
Asian U20 Championships
Gold medal – first place	2016 Ho Chi Minh City	800 m
Silver medal – second place	2016 Ho Chi Minh City	4×400m

Amoj Jacob (born 2 May 1998) is an Indian sprinter who specializes in 400 m events. Jacob has represented India in the men's 4 × 400 m event at the 2020 and 2024 Olympics.

== Career ==
In July 2017, Jacob was part of India's gold medal-winning 4 × 400 metres relay team at the Asian Athletics Championships. The team of Jacob, Kunhu Muhammed, Arokia Rajiv and Mohammad Anas clocked 3:02.92, the season best time in Asia, to give India its first gold at the event since Seoul 1975. With this performance, the team entered the Athletics World Championships in August 2017 with the sixth best timing in the world. He competed in the 2020 Tokyo Olympics in the Men's 4 × 400 m relay event where the Indian team broke the Asian and National Records and clocked a time of 3:00.25.

In 2021, Jacob won the gold medal in the 400 metres event at the 2021 Federation Cup Senior Athletics Championships. And finally he won a gold medal at the men's 4×400 metres relay event at the 2022 Asian Games.
