= Athletics at the 2014 Asian Games – Men's 4 × 400 metres relay =

Men's 4 × 400 metres relay at the 2014 Asian Games
- Venue: Incheon Asiad Main Stadium
- Dates: 29 September – 2 October 2014
- Competitors: 65 from 16 nations

Medalists
gold medal	Japan; Yuzo Kanemaru, Kenji Fujimitsu, Shota Iizuka, Nobuya Kato, Shinji Takahira
silver medal	South Korea; Park Se-jung, Park Bong-go, Seong Hyeok-je, Yeo Ho-sua, Choi Dong-baek
bronze medal	Saudi Arabia; Ismail Al-Sabiani, Ahmed Al-Khayri, Mohammed Al-Bishi, Yousef Masrahi

The men's 4 × 400 metres relay event at the 2014 Asian Games was held at the Incheon Asiad Main Stadium, Incheon, South Korea on 29 September – 2 October.

== Schedule ==
All times are Korea Standard Time (UTC+09:00)

Date	Time	Event
Monday, 29 September 2014	20:35	Round 1
Thursday, 2 October 2014	20:20	Final

== Records ==
Prior to this competition, the existing world, Asian and Games records were as follows.

World Record	United States	2:54.29	Stuttgart, Germany	22 August 1993
Asian Record	Japan	3:00.76	Atlanta, United States	3 August 1996
Games Record	Japan	3:01.70	Bangkok, Thailand	19 December 1998

== Results ==
Legend

- DNF — Did not finish
- DNS — Did not start

=== Round 1 ===
- Qualification: First 3 in each heat (Q) and the next 2 fastest (q) advance to the final.

==== Heat 1 ====
Rank	Team	Time	Notes
1	Japan (JPN); Nobuya Kato; Kenji Fujimitsu; Shinji Takahira; Yuzo Kanemaru	3:05.53	Q
2	China (CHN); Ou Shaowei; Chen Ke; Zhang Huadong; Zhu Chenbin	3:09.19	Q
3	Kazakhstan (KAZ); Dmitriy Korobeynikov; Igor Kondratyev; Omirserik Bekenov; Sergey Zaikov	3:09.92	Q
4	Oman (OMA); Salah Al-Ajmi; Othman Al-Busaidi; Mohamed Obaid Al-Saadi; Ahmed Al-Merjabi	3:10.01	q
5	Sri Lanka (SRI); Kalinga Kumarage; Anjana Gunaratne; Kasun Seneviratne; Nalin Karunarathna	3:10.30	q
6	Philippines (PHI); Archand Bagsit; Edgardo Alejan; Julius Nierras; Isidro del Prado	3:11.67	
7	Chinese Taipei (TPE); Lin Chih-wei; Wang Wei-hsu; Yu Chia-hsuan; Lo Yen-yao	3:13.07	
—	Qatar (QAT); Eid Abdulla Al-Kuwari; Hassan Aman Salmeen; Mohamad Al-Garni; Gamal Abdelnasir Abubaker	DNS	

==== Heat 2 ====
Rank	Team	Time	Notes
1	Saudi Arabia (KSA); Ismail Al-Sabiani; Ahmed Al-Khayri; Mohammed Al-Bishi; Yousef Masrahi	3:05.39	Q
2	India (IND); Kunhu Muhammed; Joseph Abraham; Jithin Paul; Arokia Rajiv	3:05.60	Q
3	South Korea (KOR); Park Se-jung; Park Bong-go; Choi Dong-baek; Seong Hyeok-je	3:05.89	Q
4	Hong Kong (HKG); Chan Ka Chun; Leung King Hung; Ho Tsz Fung; Choi Ho Sing	3:11.28	
5	Iraq (IRQ); Maytham Hussein; Karrar Abdul-Zahra; Mohammed Abdul-Ridha; Mohammed Hasan	3:11.44	
6	Thailand (THA); Suppachai Chimdee; Vitsanu Phosri; Saharat Sammayan; Srikharin Wannasa	3:11.73	
—	Iran (IRI); Mehdi Rahimi; Mehdi Zamani; Ehsan Tahmasebi; Sajjad Hashemi	DNF	
—	Kuwait (KUW) — — — —	DNS	

=== Final ===
Rank	Team	Time	Notes
1st place, gold medalist(s)	Japan (JPN); Yuzo Kanemaru; Kenji Fujimitsu; Shota Iizuka; Nobuya Kato	3:01.88	
2nd place, silver medalist(s)	South Korea (KOR); Park Se-jung; Park Bong-go; Seong Hyeok-je; Yeo Ho-sua	3:04.03	
3rd place, bronze medalist(s)	Saudi Arabia (KSA); Ismail Al-Sabiani; Ahmed Al-Khayri; Mohammed Al-Bishi; Yousef Masrahi	3:04.03	
4	India (IND); Kunhu Muhammed; Joseph Abraham; Jithin Paul; Arokia Rajiv	3:04.61	
5	China (CHN); Ou Shaowei; Cheng Wen; Zhang Huadong; Zhu Chenbin	3:06.51	
6	Oman (OMA); Salah Al-Ajmi; Othman Al-Busaidi; Mohamed Obaid Al-Saadi; Ahmed Mubarak Al-Saadi	3:07.71	
7	Sri Lanka (SRI); Udaya Viraj Weerasinghe; Anjana Gunaratne; Kasun Seneviratne; Nalin Karunarathna	3:08.11	
8	Kazakhstan (KAZ); Dmitriy Korobeynikov; Igor Kondratyev; Omirserik Bekenov; Sergey Zaikov	3:09.62	
