= 2017 Asian Athletics Championships – Men's 4 × 400 metres relay =

The men's 4 × 400 metres relay at the 2017 Asian Athletics Championships was held on 9 July.

== Medalists ==
Gold	Silver	Bronze
India; Kunju Muhammed; Amoj Jacob; Arokia Rajiv; Mohammad Anas; Mohan Kumar*; Sachin Roby*	Sri Lanka; Tharusha Dananjaya; Kalinga Kumarage; Ajith Premakumara; Dilip Ruwan	Thailand; Apisit Chamsri; Nattapong Kongkraphan; Jirayu Pleenaram; Phitchaya Sunthonthuam; Vitsanu Phosri*

*Athletes who ran in heats only

== Results ==
=== Heats ===
Qualification rule: First 3 in each heat (Q) and the next 2 fastest (q) qualified for the final.

Rank	Heat	Nation	Athletes	Time	Notes
1	1	India	Kunju Muhammed, Sachin Roby, Mohan Kumar, Arokia Rajiv	3:06.96	Q
2	1	Chinese Taipei	Wang Wei-hsu, Yang Lung-hsiang, Yu Chen-yi, Chen Chieh	3:08.35	Q
3	2	Sri Lanka	Tharusha Dananjaya, Kalinga Kumarage, Ajith Premakumara, Dilip Ruwan	3:09.96	Q
4	2	Thailand	Apisit Chamsri, Nattapong Kongkraphan, Vitsanu Phosri, Phitchaya Sunthonthuam	3:11.14	Q
5	2	Oman	Salah Ibrahim, Yousuf Thani, Abdul Rahim, Othman Al-Busaidi	3:11.15	Q
6	2	Pakistan	Mehboob Ali, Mazhar Ali, Asad Iqbal, Nokar Hussain	3:11.15	q
7	1	Kazakhstan	Vyacheslav Zems, Igor Kondratyev, Andrey Sokolov, Dmitriy Koblov	3:14.18	Q
8	1	South Korea	Hwang Hye-onu, Choi Min-gi, Lee Yo-han, Mo Il-hwan	3:14.53	q
9	1	Tajikistan	Davron Atabaev, Alisher Pulotov, Azizd Abdullaev, Grigoriy Derepaskin	3:17.18	
10	2	Afghanistan	Abdul Wahab Zahiri, Wais Ibrahim Khairandesh, Guhary Abdul Zaher, Sadat Khoshal	3:20.77	
11	2	United Arab Emirates	Ali Moosa Shaiba, Mohammed Al-Bolooshi, Hassan Mayouf, Omar Al-Salfah	3:35.00	
	1	Kuwait		DNS	

=== Final ===
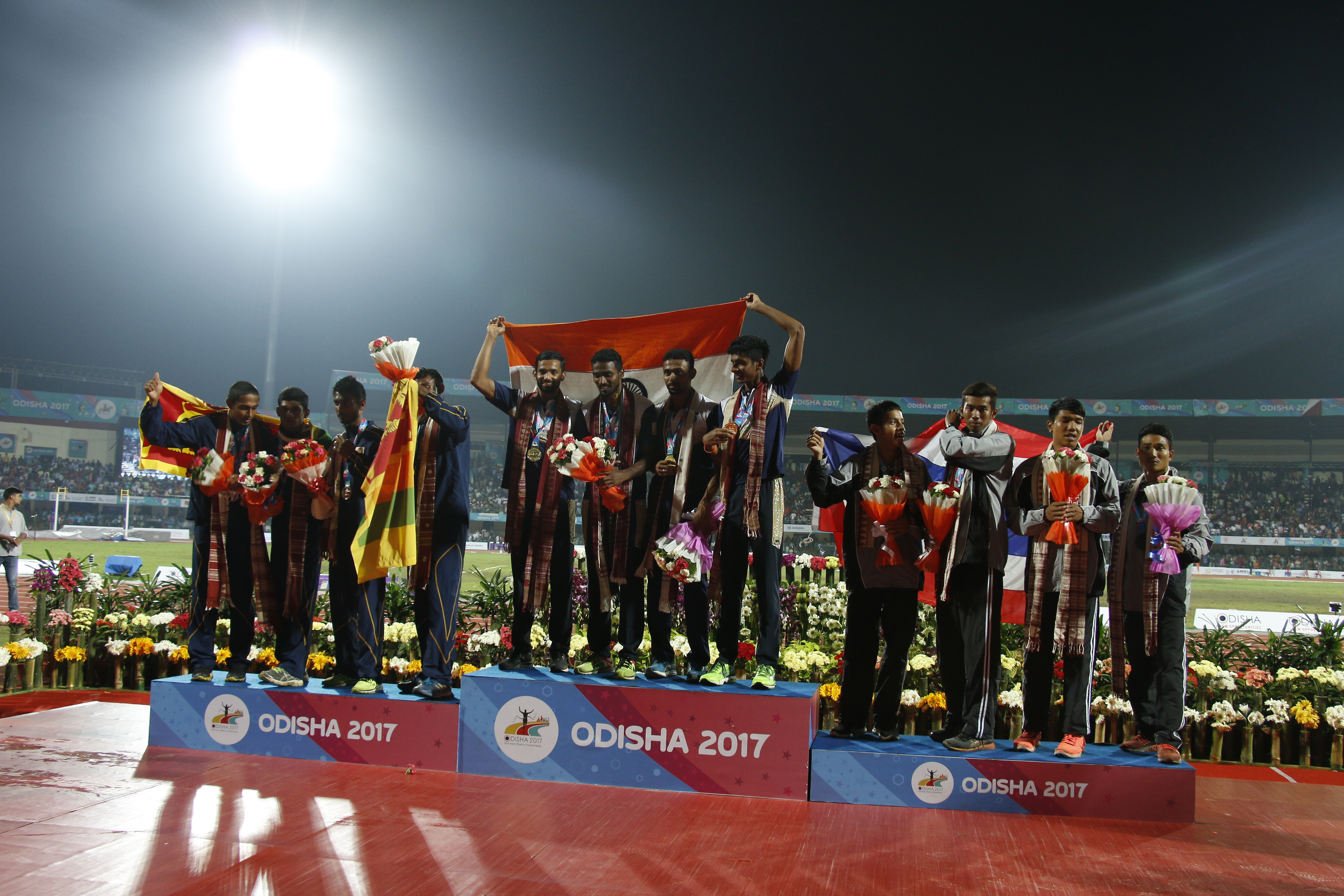
4 × 400 m Men Relay India (Gold), Sri Lanka (Silver) and Thailand (Bronze)

Rank	Team	Name	Time	Notes
1st place, gold medalist(s)	India	Kunju Muhammed, Amoj Jacob, Arokia Rajiv, Mohammad Anas	3:02.92	
2nd place, silver medalist(s)	Sri Lanka	Tharusha Dananjaya, Kalinga Kumarage, Ajith Premakumara, Dilip Ruwan	3:04.80	
3rd place, bronze medalist(s)	Thailand	Apisit Chamsri, Nattapong Kongkraphan, Jirayu Pleenaram, Phitchaya Sunthonthuam	3:06.48	
4	Chinese Taipei	Wang Wei-hsu, Yang Lung-hsiang, Yu Chen-yi, Chen Chieh	3:06.51	NR
5	Oman	Salah Ibrahim, Othman Al-Busaidi, Mohamed Obaid Al-Hindi, Ahmed Mubarak Salah	3:06.79	
6	South Korea	Park Bong-go, Choi Min-gi, Mo Il-hwan, Lee Jae-ha	3:09.15	
7	Pakistan	Mehboob Ali, Mazhar Ali, Asad Iqbal, Nokar Hussain	3:11.42	
8	Kazakhstan	Vyacheslav Zems, Igor Kondratyev, Andrey Sokolov, Dmitriy Koblov	3:11.49	
