= Ahmed Al-Merjabi =

Omani sprinter

Personal information
- Born: September 9, 1990 (age 35) Ibra, Oman
- Height: 1.70 m (5 ft 7 in)
- Weight: 65 kg (143 lb)

Sport
- Country: Oman
- Sport: Athletics
- Event: 400m
Medal record
Men's athletics
Representing Oman
Asian Indoor Championships
Bronze medal – third place	2014 Hangzhou	4×400 m

Ahmed Mohamed Al-Merjabi (born 9 September 1990 in Ibra, Oman) is an Omani runner. He was scheduled to compete at the 2012 Summer Olympics in the 400 m event but injured his foot in training and did not start the race.

== International competitions ==
Year	Competition	Venue	Position	Event	Notes
Representing Oman
2009	Arab Championships	Damascus, Syria	7th	200 m	21.75
2009	Arab Championships	Damascus, Syria	3rd	4 × 100 m relay	40.37
2011	Asian Championships	Kobe, Japan	1st (h)	400 m	46.06^{1}
2011	Asian Championships	Kobe, Japan	5th	4 × 400 m relay	3:09.28
2011	World Championships	Daegu, South Korea	31st (h)	400 m	47.99
2011	Arab Championships	Al Ain, United Arab Emirates	2nd	400 m	46.74
2011	Arab Championships	Al Ain, United Arab Emirates	3rd	4 × 400 m relay	3:08.82
2011	Pan Arab Games	Doha, Qatar	2nd	400 m	45.84
2011	Pan Arab Games	Doha, Qatar	3rd	4 × 400 m relay	3:08.54
2013	Arab Championships	Doha, Qatar	4th	400 m	46.27
2013	Arab Championships	Doha, Qatar	1st	4 × 100 m relay	39.83
2014	Asian Indoor Championships	Hangzhou, China	3rd	4 × 400 m relay	3:13.49
2014	Asian Games	Incheon, South Korea	24th (h)	400 m	48.88
2014	Asian Games	Incheon, South Korea	6th	4 × 400 m relay	3:07.71
2015	Asian Championships	Wuhan, China	6th	4 × 400 m relay	3:05.94
2015	Military World Games	Mungyeong, South Korea	7th	4 × 400 m relay	3:10.24

^{1}Disqualified in the final
