= Joel Burgunder =

Swiss sprinter

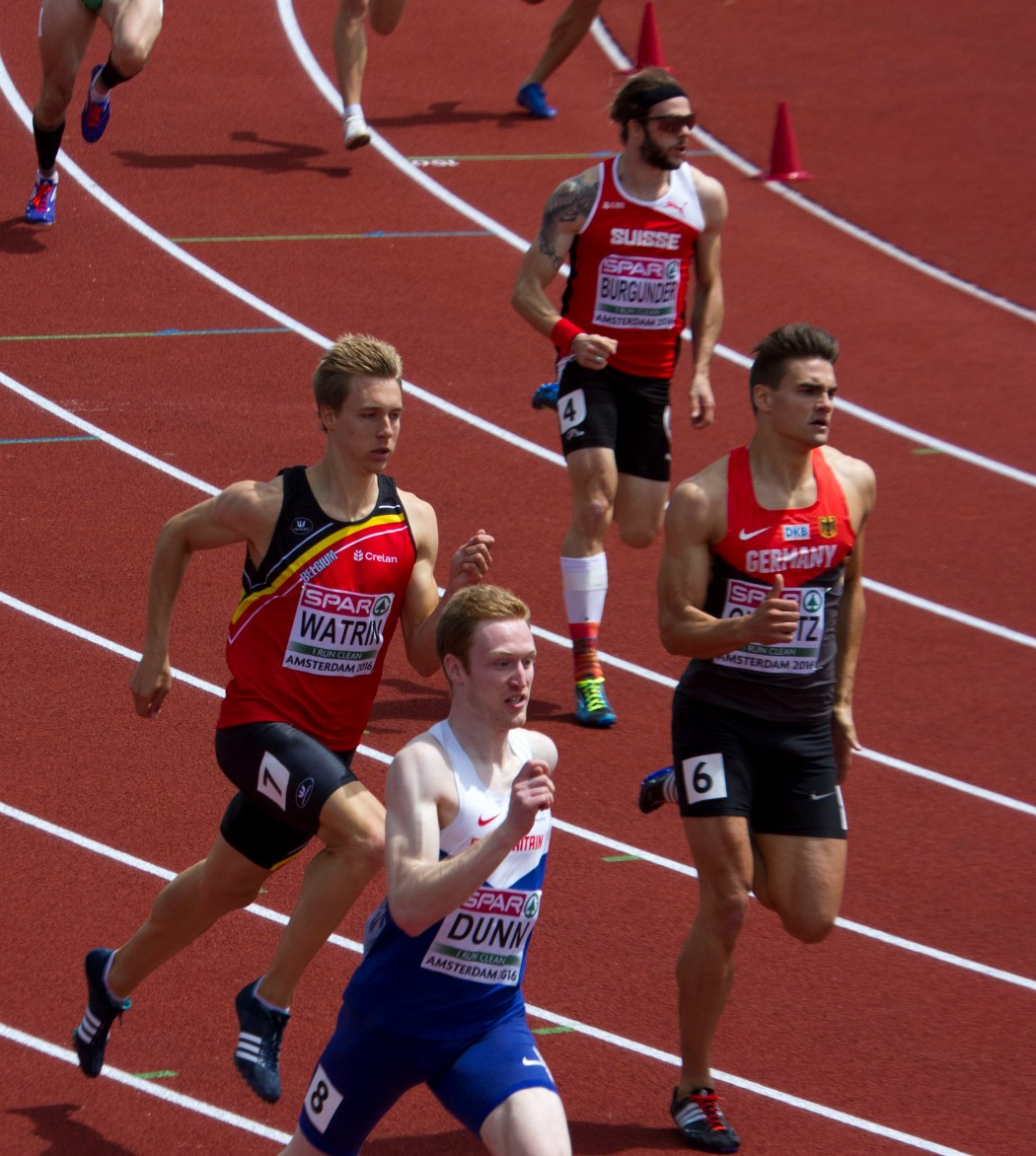
- Joel Burgunder (no. 4) during the 2016 European Athletics Championships – Men's 400 metres

Personal information
- Born: 20 May 1991 (age 34)
- Height: 1.76 m (5 ft 9 in)
- Weight: 70 kg (154 lb)

Sport
- Sport: Athletics
- Event: 400 metres
- Club: Leichtathletik Club Zürich
- Coached by: Flavio Zberg

Joel Burgunder (born 20 May 1991) is a Swiss sprinter competing primarily in the 400 metres. He represented his country at three consecutive European Championships. He also won a gold medal in the 4 × 400 metres relay at the 2017 Jeux de la Francophonie

== International competitions ==
| Year | Competition | Venue | Position | Event | Notes |
Representing Switzerland
| 2014 | European Championships | Amsterdam, Netherlands | 25th (sf) | 200 m | 21.24 |
| 2015 | Military World Games | Mungyeong, South Korea | 16th (sf) | 200 m | 21.82 |
| 2015 | Military World Games | Mungyeong, South Korea | 9th (h) | 4 × 400 m relay | 3:08.57 |
| 2016 | European Championships | Amsterdam, Netherlands | 24th (sf) | 400 m | 47.23 |
| 2016 | European Championships | Amsterdam, Netherlands | 14th (h) | 4 × 400 m relay | 3:06.52 |
| 2017 | Jeux de la Francophonie | Abidjan, Ivory Coast | 1st | 4 × 400 m relay | 3:10.70 |
| 2018 | European Championships | Berlin, Germany | 30th (h) | 400 m | 48.78 |
| 2018 | European Championships | Berlin, Germany | – | 4 × 400 m relay | DQ |

== Personal bests ==
Outdoor

- 100 metres – 10.54 (+1.3 m/s, Winterthur 2014)
- 200 metres – 20.84 (+1.5 m/s, Langenthal 2016)
- 400 metres – 46.00 (Zürich 2017)

Indoor

- 60 metres – 6.80 (Magglingen 2013)
- 200 metres – 21.55 (Magglingen 2013)
- 400 metres – 49.17 (St. Gallen 2015)
