= Silvan Lutz =

Swiss sprinter (born 1990)

Personal information
- Born: 17 October 1990 (age 35)

Sport
- Sport: Athletics
- Event: 400 metres
- Club: TV Länggasse Bern

Silvan Lutz (born 17 October 1990) is a Swiss sprinter specialising in the 400 metres. He won a gold medal in the 4 × 400 metres relay at the 2017 Jeux de la Francophonie. He also competed at two consecutive European Championships.

== International competitions ==
Year	Competition	Venue	Position	Event	Notes
Representing Switzerland
2009	European Junior Championships	Novi Sad, Serbia	13th (h)	400 m	48.80
2011	European U23 Championships	Ostrava, Czech Republic	9th (h)	4 × 400 m relay	3:15.11
2013	Jeux de la Francophonie	Nice, France	3rd	4 × 400 m relay	3:07.21
2014	European Championships	Zürich, Switzerland	14th (h)	4 × 400 m relay	3:08.63
2015	Military World Games	Mungyeong, South Korea	14th (sf)	400 m	47.10
2015	Military World Games	Mungyeong, South Korea	9th (h)	4 × 400 m relay	3:08.57
2016	European Championships	Amsterdam, Netherlands	14th (h)	4 × 400 m relay	3:06.52
2017	Jeux de la Francophonie	Abidjan, Ivory Coast	1st	4 × 400 m relay	3:10.70
2017	Universiade	Taipei, Taiwan	13th (sf)	400 m	46.89
2017	Universiade	Taipei, Taiwan	5th	4 × 400 m relay	3:09.94

== Personal bests ==
Outdoor

- 200 metres – 21.25 (-1.6 m/s, Bern 2017)
- 400 metres – 46.83 (Luzern 2013)

Indoor

- 200 metres – 22.22 (Magglingen 2009)
- 400 metres – 47.74 (Magglingen 2017)
