= Asad Iqbal =

Pakistani martial artist (born 2000)

Personal information
- Born: 11 April 1986 (age 40)
- Height: 1.78 m (5 ft 10 in)
- Weight: 76 kg (168 lb)

Sport
- Sport: Athletics
- Event: 400 metres
Medal record
Men's athletics
Representing Pakistan
Asian Indoor and Martial Arts Games
Gold medal – first place	2017 Ashgabat	4 × 400 m
Islamic Solidarity Games
Silver medal – second place	2017 Baku	4 × 400 m
South Asian Games
Bronze medal – third place	2006 Colombo	4 × 400 m
Bronze medal – third place	2010 Dhaka	4 × 400 m
Bronze medal – third place	2016 Guwahati	4 × 400 m

Asad Iqbal (Urdu: اسد اقبال; born 11 April 1986) is a retired Pakistani sprinter ho specialised in the 400 metres. He represented his country at the 2006 World Indoor Championships getting disqualified in the first round.

His personal bests in the event are 47.42 seconds outdoors (Guwahati 2016) and 48.71 seconds indoors (Doha 2016). The latter is the current national record.

== Personal best ==
Event	Result	Venue	Date
Outdoor
400 metres	47.42 sec	(India) Guwahati	9 February 2016
Indoor
400 metres	48.71 sec	(Qatar) Doha	19 February 2016

== International competitions ==
Year	Competition	Venue	Position	Event	Notes
Representing Pakistan
2005	Universiade	Izmir, Turkey	28th (h)	400 m	48.57
2006	World Indoor Championships	Moscow, Russia	–	400 m	DQ
2006	South Asian Games	Colombo, Sri Lanka	5th	400 m	48.11
2006	South Asian Games	Colombo, Sri Lanka	3rd	4 × 400 m relay	3:11:35
2010	South Asian Games	Dhaka, Bangladesh	3rd	4 × 400 m relay	3:16.70
2013	Asian Championships	Pune, India	19th (h)	400 m	48.85
2016	Asian Indoor Championships	Doha, Qatar	11th (h)	400 m	48.71
2016	South Asian Games	Guwahati, India	4th	400 m	47.42
2016	South Asian Games	Guwahati, India	3rd	4 × 400 m relay	3:14.82
2017	Islamic Solidarity Games	Baku, Azerbaijan	15th (h)	400 m	49.08
2017	Islamic Solidarity Games	Baku, Azerbaijan	2nd	4 × 400 m relay	3:07.62
2017	Asian Championships	Bhubaneswar, India	7th	4 × 400 m relay	3:11.42
2017	Asian Indoor and Martial Arts Games	Ashgabat, Turkmenistan	1st	4 × 400 m relay	3:11.40 NR
