= Mo Il-hwan =

South Korean sprinter

Personal information
- Born: 18 May 1999 (age 26)

Sport
- Country: South Korea

Mo Il-hwan (born 18 May 1999) is a South Korean sprinter who specializes in the 400 metres.

He competed in the heats at the 2016 World U20 Championships and reached the semi-final at the 2017 Asian Championships, the 2018 Asian Games and the 2019 Asian Championships.

In the 4 × 400 metres relay he finished sixth at the 2017 Asian Championships. He was also a heat runner in the 4 × 100 at the 2018 Asian Games.

His personal best time is 46.17 seconds, achieved at the 2019 Asian Championships in Doha.
