= Athletics at the 2018 Asian Games – Mixed 4 × 400 metres relay =

Mixed 4 × 400 metres relay at the 2018 Asian Games
- Venue: Gelora Bung Karno Stadium
- Date: 28 August 2018
- Competitors: 32 from 8 nations

Medalists
| gold medal | India; Muhammed Anas, M. R. Poovamma, Hima Das, Arokia Rajiv |
| silver medal | Kazakhstan; Svetlana Golendova, Dmitriy Koblov, Elina Mikhina, Mikhail Litvin |
| bronze medal | China; Cheng Chong, Yang Lei, Huang Guifen, Wu Yuang |

The Mixed 4 × 400 metres relay competition at the 2018 Asian Games in Jakarta was held on 28 August 2018 at the Gelora Bung Karno Stadium. This event made its debut in 2018 Asian Games in Jakarta. India claimed the gold medal in this event, with Kazakhstan and China bagging silver and bronze respectively.

Bahrain originally won the gold medal, however, the Athletics Federation of India lodged a protest against Bahrain, claiming that Bahrain's Kemi Adekoya had obstructed Hima Das during the Final. However, the Asian Games' Jury of Appeals rejected India's claim.

Later, when Adekoya tested positive for stanozolol in January 2019, the Athletics Integrity Unit ordered that her results from 24 August 2018 be deleted from the records, thus disqualifying the Bahraini team.

== Schedule ==
All times are Western Indonesia Time (UTC+07:00)

| Date | Time | Event |
|---|---|---|
| Tuesday, 28 August 2018 | 20:45 | Final |

== Results ==
| Rank | Team | Time | Notes |
|---|---|---|---|
| 1st place, gold medalist(s) | India (IND); Muhammed Anas; M. R. Poovamma; Hima Das; Arokia Rajiv | 3:15.71 | |
| 2nd place, silver medalist(s) | Kazakhstan (KAZ); Svetlana Golendova; Dmitriy Koblov; Elina Mikhina; Mikhail Litvin | 3:19.52 | |
| 3rd place, bronze medalist(s) | China (CHN); Cheng Chong; Yang Lei; Huang Guifen; Wu Yuang | 3:19.91 | |
| 4 | Japan (JPN); Jun Kimura; Ayaka Kawata; Eri Utsunomiya; Jun Yamashita | 3:21.90 | |
| 5 | Vietnam (VIE); Nguyễn Thị Hằng; Phan Khắc Hoàng; Cấn Thị Thủy; Trần Đình Sơn | 3:23.59 | |
| 6 | Thailand (THA); Supanich Poolkerd; Jirayu Pleenaram; Arisa Weruwanarak; Phitchaya Sunthonthuam | 3:25.80 | |
| 7 | Indonesia (INA); Heru Astriyanto; Gusti Ayu Mardiliningsih; Arif Rahman; Maulidah | 3:29.96 | |
| DQ | Bahrain (BRN); Ali Khamis; Kemi Adekoya; Salwa Eid Naser; Abbas Abubakar Abbas | ~~3:11.89~~ | |

- Bahrain originally won the gold medal, but were disqualified after Kemi Adekoya tested positive for stanozolol. The Athletics Integrity Unit also ordered that Adekoya's results from 24 August 2018 be deleted from the records.
