= Davron Atabaev =

Tajikistani sprinter

Personal information
- Born: 6 July 1993 (age 32)
- Education: Russian-Tajik Slavonic University

Sport
- Sport: Athletics
- Event: 400 metres

Davron Atabaev (born 6 July 1993) is a Tajikistani sprinter specialising in the 400 metres. He represented his country at the 2018 World Indoor Championships.

== International competitions ==
Year	Competition	Venue	Position	Event	Notes
Representing Tajikistan
2010	Youth Olympic Games	Singapore	2nd (C)	200 m	22.24
2012	Asian Junior Championships	Colombo, Sri Lanka	27th (h)	100 m	11.22
2012	Asian Junior Championships	Colombo, Sri Lanka	14th (sf)	200 m	22.53
2012	World Junior Championships	Barcelona, Spain	57th (h)	100 m	11.11
2013	Universiade	Kazan, Russia	36th (h)	100 m	10.98
2013	Universiade	Kazan, Russia	41st (h)	200 m	22.25
2014	Asian Games	Incheon, South Korea	25th (h)	200 m	21.91
2014	Asian Games	Incheon, South Korea	25th (h)	400 m	49.10
2015	Asian Championships	Wuhan, China	22nd (sf)	100 m	10.75
2015	Asian Championships	Wuhan, China	25th (h)	200 m	21.85
2016	Asian Indoor Championships	Doha, Qatar	24th (h)	60 m	7.09
2017	Asian Championships	Bhubaneswar, India	26th (h)	100 m	10.90
2017	Asian Championships	Bhubaneswar, India	18th (h)	400 m	48.54
2017	Asian Championships	Bhubaneswar, India	9th (h)	4 × 400 m relay	3:17.18
2017	Asian Indoor and Martial Arts Games	Ashgabat, Turkmenistan	21st (h)	60 m	7.11
2017	Asian Indoor and Martial Arts Games	Ashgabat, Turkmenistan	6th (sf)	400 m	48.57
2017	Asian Indoor and Martial Arts Games	Ashgabat, Turkmenistan	–	4 × 400 m relay	DQ
2018	World Indoor Championships	Birmingham, United Kingdom	21st (h)	400 m	49.20
2018	Asian Games	Jakarta, Indonesia	19th (sf)	400 m	48.89

== Personal bests ==
Outdoor

- 100 metres – 10.53 (+1.9 m/s, Dushanbe 2016)
- 200 metres – 20.95 (+1.8 m/s, Dushanbe 2016) NR
- 400 metres – 47.60 (Almaty 2017) NR

Indoor

- 60 metres – 7.09 (Doha 2016)
- 400 metres – 48.57 (Ashgabat 2017)
