= Ahmed Mubarak Al-Saadi =

Omani sprinter

Ahmed Mubarak Salah
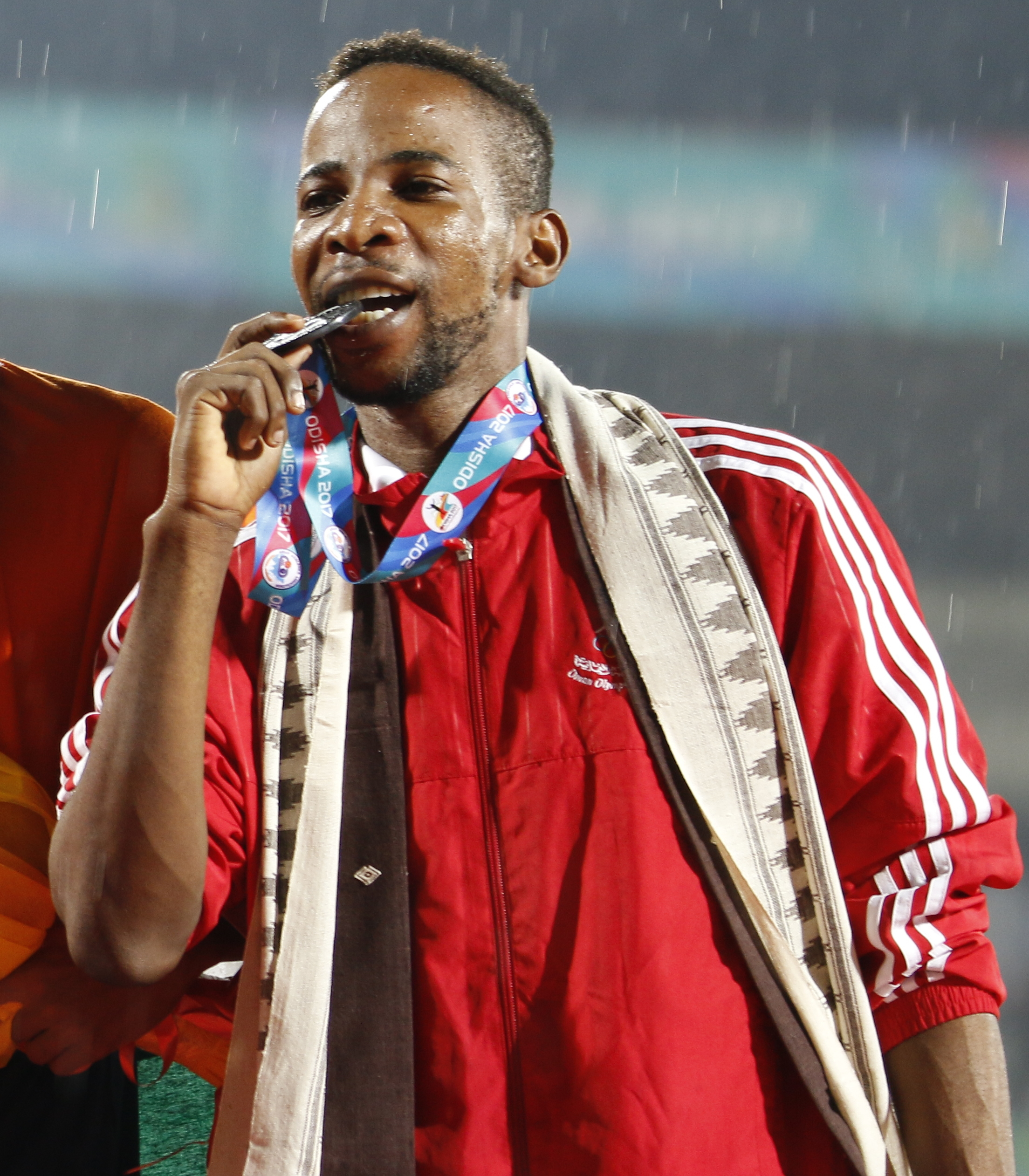
- Ahmed Mubarak Salah in 2017

Personal information
- Born: 28 December 1988 (age 37)
- Height: 1.70 m (5 ft 7 in)
- Weight: 69 kg (152 lb)

Sport
- Sport: Athletics
- Event: 400 metres
Medal record
Men's athletics
Representing Oman
Asian Indoor Championships
Bronze medal – third place	2014 Hangzhou	400 m
Bronze medal – third place	2014 Hangzhou	4×400 m

Ahmed Mubarak Salah Al-Saadi (born 28 December 1988) is an Omani sprinter specialising in the 400 metres. He won a bronze medal at the 2017 Asian Championships.

His personal bests in the event are 45.89 seconds outdoors (Jeddah 2017) and 48.46 seconds indoors (Ashgabat 2017).

== International competitions ==
Year	Competition	Venue	Position	Event	Notes
Representing Oman
2014	Asian Indoor Championships	Hangzhou, China	3rd	400 m	48.51
2014	Asian Indoor Championships	Hangzhou, China	3rd	4 × 400 m relay	3:13.49
2014	Asian Games	Incheon, South Korea	6th	4 × 400 m relay	3:07.71
2015	Asian Championships	Wuhan, China	8th (h)	400 m	46.90
2015	Asian Championships	Wuhan, China	6th	4 × 400 m relay	3:05.94
2015	Military World Games	Mungyeong, South Korea	8th	400 m	46.82
2015	Military World Games	Mungyeong, South Korea	7th	4 × 400 m relay	3:10.24
2017	Islamic Solidarity Games	Baku, Azerbaijan	4th	400 m	46.58
2017	Islamic Solidarity Games	Baku, Azerbaijan	3rd	4 × 400 m relay	3:08.94
2017	Asian Championships	Bhubaneswar, India	3rd	400 m	46.39
2017	Asian Championships	Bhubaneswar, India	5th	4 × 400 m relay	3:06.79
2017	Arab Championships	Radès, Tunisia	3rd	400 m	47.05
2017	Arab Championships	Radès, Tunisia	2nd	4 × 400 m relay	3:08.82
2017	Asian Indoor and Martial Arts Games	Ashgabat, Turkmenistan	6th	400 m	48.46
