= 2017 Arab Athletics Championships =

20th Arab Athletics Championships
- Dates: 15–18 July 2017
- Host city: Radès, Tunisia
- Participation: ~400 athletes from 16 nations

The 2017 Arab Athletics Championships was the twentieth edition of the international athletics competition between Arab countries that took place from 15–18 July 2017 at Rades Athletic Stadium in Radès, close to Tunis, the capital of Tunisia. Around 400 athletes from 18 nations attended the event.

A series of grand prix track and field meetings were organised by the Arab Athletics Federation in order to promote qualification for the 2017 World Athletic Championships.

== Medal summary ==
=== Men ===
Event	Gold		Silver		Bronze	
100 metres (wind: +2.2 m/s)	Mohammed Abdallah (KSA)	10.19w	Ahmed Ali (SUD)	10.24w	Tosin Ogunode (QAT)	10.35w
200 metres	Adem Ahmed Ali (SUD)	20.49	Fehd Sebei (KSA)	20.56	Mohamed Ben Abid Hendi Saadi (OMN)	21.12
400 metres	Yousef Karam (KUW)	46.45	Mazen Al-Yassin (KSA)	46.76	Ahmed Ben Mbarek Al-Saadi (OMA)	47.05
800 metres	Oussama Nabil (MAR)	1:47.24	Mohamed Belbachir (ALG)	1:47.57	Abdessalem Ayouni (TUN)	1:47.59
1500 metres	Mohamed Ismail Ibrahim (DJI)	3:52.38	Hichem Ouledha (MAR)	3:52.46	Abdelrahmen Annou (ALG)	3:52.51
5000 metres	Zied Ben Othman (TUN)	14:33.03	Jamel Abdi Deryah (DJI)	14:33.05	Hichem Khiari (MAR)	14:33.89
10,000 metres	Hassan Touriss (MAR)	31:01.29	Jamel Hitran (MAR)	31:01.74	Tarek Hannachi (TUN)	31:26.84
Half marathon	Atef Saad (TUN)	1:05:03	Wissem Hosni (TUN)	1:06:31	Rachid Kissri (MAR)	1:07:28
110 metres hurdles (wind: +3.1 m/s)	Yaqoub Mohamed Al-Youha (KUW)	13.48	Rami Gherselli (TUN)	14.23		
400 metres hurdles	Abdelmalik Lahoulou (ALG)	49.05 CR	Miloud Rahmani (ALG)	49.56	Zied Azizi (TUN)	50.05
3000 metres steeplechase	Mohamed Ismail Ibrahim (DJI)	8:42.25	Raouf Boubaker (TUN)	8:42.61	Bilel Tebti (ALG)	8:43.03
4×100 metres relay	Saudi Arabia; Omar Daoued; Fahed Sbei; Ahmed Mouled; Ahmed Majrachi	40.08	Oman; Rached Assimi; Samir Rayami; Mohamed Saadi; Oussema Ghilani	40.64	Kuwait; Hsssin Chiha; Mechaal Mtiri; Yaqoub Mohamed Al-Youha; Abdelazi Mohamed	40.83
4×400 metres relay	Algeria; Miloud Laaredj; Fethi Benchaa; Miloud Rahmani; Abdelmalik Lahoulou	3:05.49	Oman; Mohamed Abid Esaadi; Othman Al-Boussaidi; Youssef Omrani; Ahmed Ben Mbarek	3:07.46	Saudi Arabia; Ismail Sebyani; Abdallah Soulaimen; Sabeur Issa; Mazen Yassine	3:08.23
20 km walk	Mohamed Ameur (ALG)	1:32:25	Aymen Sabri (ALG)	1:33:36	Raouf Drissi Belbahi (TUN)	1:35:51
High jump	Hassine Felah Hsan (IRQ)	2.16 m	Riadh Salloum (ALG)	2.16 m	Mohammed Amine Hamdi (QAT)	2.13 m
Pole vault	Hichem Cherabi (ALG)	5.25 m	Mohamed Amine Romdhana (TUN)	5.20 m	Majdi Chahata (TUN)	4.80 m
Long jump	Yasser Mohamed Tahar Triki (ALG)	7.83 m	Mohsen Khouwa (MAR)	7.65 m	Marouen Mansour (TUN)	7.50 m
Triple jump	Yasser Mohamed Tahar Triki (ALG)	16.63 m	Khaled Saeed AL-Subaie (KUW)	16.49 m	Abderrahim Zahouani (MAR)	16.15 m
Shot put	Soltani Al-Habchi (KSA)	18.19 m	Amine Al-Aradi (KSA)	16.86 m	Mosaeb Moumni (JOR)	16.85 m
Discus throw	Essa Al-Zenkawi (KUW)	59.75 m	Soltan Dhaouadi (KSA)	58.98 m	Mohamed Saber Mouadh (QAT)	58.94 m
Hammer throw	Ahmed Amjem Al-Sifi (QAT)	69.85 m	Mohsen Anani (TUN)	69.59 m	Mohammed El-Dbisi (KSA)	62.20 m
Javelin throw	Mohamad Ibrahim Kaida (QAT)	71.45 m	Ali Abdel Ghani (KSA)	71.44 m	Abdallah Al-Ghandi (KSA)	64.87 m
Decathlon	Malek Alzid (KWT)	7118 pts	Yacine Ahmed (KSA)	6265 pts	Aymen Hmissi (TUN)	5685 pts

=== Women ===
Event	Gold		Silver		Bronze	
100 metres (wind: +4.5 m/s)	Assia Raziki (MAR)	11.63w	Dana Hussein (IRQ)	11.69w	Mazoun Bent Khalfen AL-Aloui (OMN)	11.85w
200 metres (wind: +2.2 m/s)	Assia Raziki (MAR)	23.80w	Khadija Wardi (MAR)	24.25w	Dana Hussain (IRQ)	24.31w
400 metres	Khadija Wardi (MAR)	53.97	Alaa Hikmat Jassem (IRQ)	56.07	Tsabih Mohammed Said (SUD)	56.51
800 metres	Oumayma Saoud (MAR)	2:16.83	Haifa Tarchoun (TUN)	2:17.04	Amina Barcham Bakhit (SUD)	2:17.61
1500 metres	Oumayma Saoud (MAR)	4:30.45	Haifa Tarchoun (TUN)	4:30.80	Amina Barcham Bakhit (SUD)	4:31.12
5000 metres	Alia Saeed Mohammed (UAE)	16:39.41	Soukaina Atnen (MAR)	17:05.23	Fatma Zahraa Kardedi (MAR)	17:52.04
10,000 metres	Alia Saeed Mohammed (UAE)	38:53.31	Amina Tahri (MAR)	39:18.15	Hanen Khalouj (MAR)	39:51.48
Half marathon	Hayet Aloui (MAR)	1:20:34	Samia Dhahri (TUN)	1:28:57	Nada Amri (TUN)	1:40:39
100 metres hurdles	Sana Zouin (MAR)	14.38	Dalsouz Abid Najm (IRQ)	14.80	Khouloud Haddadi (TUN)	15.57
400 metres hurdles	Tasabih Mohamed Said (SUD)	60.35	Safa Othman Abdelkarim (SUD)	61.35	Fatma Zahra Zarouk (MAR)	62.71
3000 metres steeplechase	Habiba Ghribi (TUN)	9:20.00	Amina Bettich (ALG)	9:58.84	Nawal Yahi (ALG)	9:59.27
4×100 metres relay	Morocco; Nadia Najalek; Khadija Wardi; Fatma Zah Razouk; Assia Raziki	46.69	Iraq; Alaa Hikmet Jassem; Dana Hussain; Dalsou Abid Najm; Khachoufi Ahmed	48.78	Tunisia; Salma Belhassan; Fatma Lahmadi; Khouloud Haddadi; Abir Barkaoui	49.35
4×400 metres relay	Morocco; Hajer Edhou; Khadija Wardi; Fatma Zah Razouk; Assia Raziki	3:44.22	Sudan; Safa Othmen Abdk; Amina Bakhit; Na. Hassan Ismail; Tasabih Mohamed Said	3:49.95	Iraq	3:50.83
10 km walk	Chahinez Nasri (TUN)	46:14	Amani Manaii (TUN)	49:07	Bariza Ghezelani (ALG)	49:26
High jump	Yosra Arrar (ALG)	1.71 m	Fatma Zahraa Aloui (MAR)	1.65 m	Nourmene Kouch (LIB)	1.60 m
Pole vault	Dorra Mahfoudhi (TUN)	4.15 m CR	Nesrine Brinis (TUN)	3.70 m		
Long jump	Roumayssa Belbayoudh (ALG)	6.30 m	Sana Zouin (MAR)	5.76 m	Zeineb Al Jalel (MAR)	5.65 m
Triple jump	Fatma El-Hamadi (TUN)	12.60 m	Chalbia Ben Salem (TUN)	11.24 m		
Shot put	Nada Chroudi (TUN)	13.42 m	Amina Mawaiid (MAR)	10.60 m	Nabiha Gaddah (TUN)	10.43 m
Discus throw	Amina Moudden (MAR)	47.49 m	Nabiha Gaddah (TUN)	29.90 m	Fajr Al-Mandani (KUW)	18.03 m
Hammer throw	Zouina Bouzebra (ALG)	62.08 m	Soukaina Zakour (MAR)	61.08 m	Samira Adi (MAR)	57.48 m
Javelin throw	Nada Chroudi (TUN)	42.25 m	Soukaina Zakour (MAR)	35.30 m	Soulayma Ghannay (TUN)	28.77 m
Heptathlon	Nada Chroudi (TUN)	5029 pts	Salima Ghanney (TUN)	3947 Pts	Nadia Mohammed Al-Hakan (EGY)	3605 Pts

== Medal table ==
Key

The host country is highlighted in lavender blue

Rank	Nation	Gold	Silver	Bronze	Total
1	Morocco	12	11	8	31
2	Tunisia*	9	13	12	34
3	Algeria	9	5	4	18
4	Kuwait	4	2	3	9
5	Saudi Arabia	3	6	3	12
6	Sudan	2	2	3	7
7	Djibouti	2	1	0	3
8	Qatar	2	0	3	5
9	United Arab Emirates	2	0	0	2
10	Iraq	1	4	2	7
11	Oman	0	2	3	5
12	Jordan	0	0	1	1
12	Lebanon	0	0	1	1
Totals (13 entries)		46	46	43	135
