= Sergey Zaikov =

Kazakhstani sprinter (born 1987)

Personal information
- Born: September 23, 1987 (age 38) Pavlodar, Soviet Union
- Height: 1.90 m (6 ft 3 in)
- Weight: 76 kg (168 lb)

Sport
- Country: Kazakhstan
- Sport: Athletics
- Event: 400m
- Coached by: Viktor Kolyev
Medal record
Men's athletics
Representing Kazakhstan
Asian Indoor Championships
Gold medal – first place	2014 Hangzhou	4×400 m
Silver medal – second place	2008 Doha	400 m
Silver medal – second place	2014 Hangzhou	400 m
Silver medal – second place	2018 Tehran	4×400 m

Sergey Zaikov (Russian:Сергей Зайков; born 23 September 1987 in Pavlodar) is a Kazakhstani runner. He competed at the 2012 Summer Olympics in the 400 m event, in which he was defeated after the first round.

== Competition record ==
Year	Competition	Venue	Position	Event	Notes
Representing Kazakhstan
2008	Asian Indoor Championships	Doha, Qatar	2nd	400 m	48.12
2009	Asian Indoor Games	Hanoi, Vietnam	3rd	400 m	47.63
2009	Asian Championships	Guangzhou, China	9th (h)	400 m	47.47
2010	Asian Indoor Championships	Tehran, Iran	6th	400 m	49.80
2010	Asian Indoor Championships	Tehran, Iran	3rd	4 × 400 m relay	3:17.06 (iNR)
2012	Asian Indoor Championships	Hangzhou, China	5th	400 m	48.97
2012	Olympic Games	London, United Kingdom	39th (h)	400 m	47.12
2014	Asian Indoor Championships	Hangzhou, China	2nd	400 m	48.37
2014	Asian Indoor Championships	Hangzhou, China	1st	4 × 400 m relay	3:12.94
2014	Asian Games	Incheon, South Korea	15th (sf)	400 m	47.33
2014	Asian Games	Incheon, South Korea	8th	4 × 400 m relay	3:09.62
2015	Asian Championships	Wuhan, China	12th (h)	400 m	47.51
2017	Asian Indoor and Martial Arts Games	Ashgabat, Turkmenistan	13th (h)	800 m	1:56.59
2017	Asian Indoor and Martial Arts Games	Ashgabat, Turkmenistan	–	4 × 400 m relay	DNF
2018	Asian Indoor Championships	Tehran, Iran	8th (h)	800 m	1:58.64
2018	Asian Indoor Championships	Tehran, Iran	2nd	4 × 400 m relay	3:11.68
