= Othman Al-Busaidi =

Omani sprinter

Personal information
- Born: 5 January 1992 (age 34)
- Education: Gulf College
- Height: 1.73 m (5 ft 8 in)
- Weight: 68 kg (150 lb)

Sport
- Sport: Athletics
- Event: 400 metres
Medal record
Men's athletics
Representing Oman
Asian Indoor Championships
Bronze medal – third place	2014 Hangzhou	4×400 m

Othman Ali Hila. Al-Busaidi (born 5 January 1992) is an Omani sprinter specialising in the 400 metres. He represented his country at the 2014 Asian Games.

== International competitions ==
Year	Competition	Venue	Position	Event	Notes
Representing Oman
2011	Arab Championships	Al Ain, United Arab Emirates	3rd	4 × 400 m relay	3:08.82
2011	Asian Championships	Kobe, Japan	5th	4 × 400 m relay	3:09.28
2012	West Asian Championships	Dubai, United Arab Emirates	3rd	400 m	47.79
2012	West Asian Championships	Dubai, United Arab Emirates	2nd	4 × 400 m relay	3:11.07
2013	Universiade	Kazan, Russia	–	800 m	DQ
2013	Universiade	Kazan, Russia	9th (h)	4 × 400 m relay	3:19.50
2014	Asian Indoor Championships	Hangzhou, China	3rd	4 × 400 m relay	3:13.49
2014	Asian Games	Incheon, South Korea	6th	4 × 400 m relay	3:07.71
2015	Asian Championships	Wuhan, China	6th	4 × 400 m relay	3:05.94
2015	Military World Games	Mungyeong, South Korea	19th (sf)	400 m	47.94
2015	Military World Games	Mungyeong, South Korea	7th	4 × 400 m relay	3:10.24
2017	Asian Championships	Bhubaneswar, India	13th (sf)	400 m	47.74
2017	Asian Championships	Bhubaneswar, India	5th	4 × 400 m relay	3:06.79
2017	Arab Championships	Radès, Tunisia	3rd (h)	400 m	47.45
2017	Arab Championships	Radès, Tunisia	2nd	4 × 400 m relay	3:08.82
2017	Universiade	Taipei, Taiwan	16th (sf)	400 m	47.20
2017	Universiade	Taipei, Taiwan	–	4 × 400 m relay	DQ
2018	West Asian Championships	Amman, Jordan	3rd	400 m	47.87
2018	West Asian Championships	Amman, Jordan	3rd	4 × 400 m relay	3:10.25
2019	Arab Championships	Cairo, Egypt	5th	400 m	47.81

== Personal bests ==
Outdoor

- 200 metres – 21.91 (+1.4 m/s, Doha 2015)
- 400 metres – 47.05 (Taipei 2017)
