= Mohan Kumar Raja =

Indian sprinter (born 1996)

Personal information
- Born: 14 December 1996 (age 28) ambattur, Chennai, Tamil Nadu, India

Sport
- Country: India
- Sport: Track and field
- Event: 400 metres

Mohan Kumar Raja (born 14 December 1996) is an Indian sprinter who was part of India's six-member 4 × 400 metres relay team at the 2016 Summer Olympics.
