= Ajith Premakumara =

Sri Lankan sprinter (born 1991)

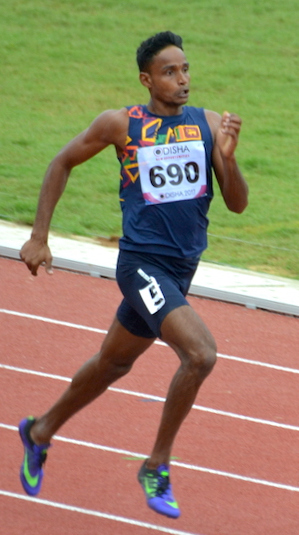
- Premakumara at the 2017 Asian Championships

Personal information
- Born: 12 October 1991 (age 34) Sri Lanka
- Height: 168 cm (5 ft 6 in)
- Weight: 77 kg (170 lb)

Sport
- Sport: Athletics
- Event(s): 200 m, 400 m

Achievements and titles
- Personal best(s): 200 m – 21.35 (2017); 400 m – 46.36 (2017)
Medal record
Representing Sri Lanka
Asian Athletics Championships
Silver medal – second place	2017 Bhubaneswar	Men's 4×400 m
South Asian Games
Silver medal – second place	2016 Guwahati	Men's 4×400 m

Ajith Premakumara Millagaha Gedara (born 12 October 1991) is a sprinter from Sri Lanka who specialises in the 400 m distance. He won silver medals in the 4 × 400 m relay at the 2016 South Asian Games and 2017 Asian Championships; his team placed fourth at the 2018 Asian Games.
