= Dilip Ruwan =

Sprinter from Sri Lanka (born 1991)

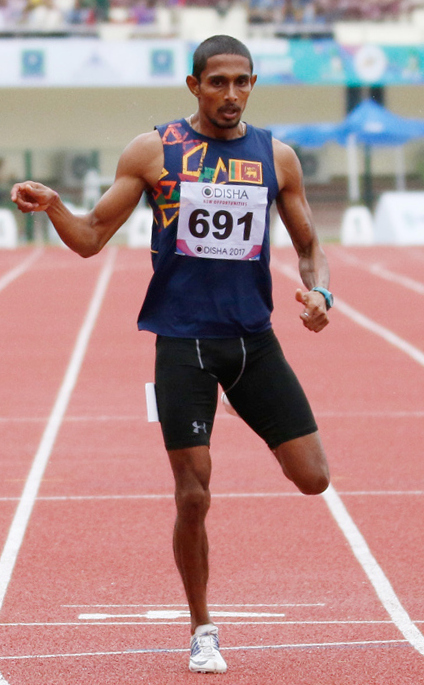
- Ruwan at the 2017 Asian Championships

Personal information
- Born: 4 July 1991 (age 34) Colombo, Sri Lanka
- Height: 175 cm (5 ft 9 in)
- Weight: 70 kg (154 lb)

Sport
- Sport: Athletics
- Event(s): 200 m, 400 m
- Club: Sri Lanka Army

Achievements and titles
- Personal best(s): 200 m – 21.15 (2017); 400 m – 46.39 (2018)
Medal record
Representing Sri Lanka
Asian Athletics Championships
Silver medal – second place	2017 Bhubaneswar	Men's 4×400 m
South Asian Games
Silver medal – second place	2016 Guwahati	Men's 4×400 m
Bronze medal – third place	2016 Guwahati	400 m

Dilip Ruwan Herath Mudiyanselage (born 4 July 1991) is a sprinter from Sri Lanka who specialises in the 400 m distance. He won silver medals in the 4 × 400 m relay at the 2016 South Asian Games and 2017 Asian Championships; his team placed fourth at the 2018 Asian Games. Individually he won a bronze medal at the 2016 South Asian Games.
