= 2014 Asian Indoor Athletics Championships =

2014 Asian Indoor Championships
- Dates: 15–16 February
- Host city: Hangzhou, China
- Events: 26
- Participation: 227 athletes from 28 nations
- Records set: 4 CRs

The 2014 Asian Indoor Athletics Championships was the sixth edition of the international indoor athletics event between Asian nations. It took place at the Vocational and Technical College Athletics Hall in Hangzhou, China, between 15 and 16 February. The city was confirmed as the host in September 2013 at the 77th Council Meeting of the Asian Athletics Association. This was the second time the city held the event, successively following on from the 2012 Championships. A total of 28 nations were represented at the tournament comprising 26 track and field events.

Qatar won the most gold medals – its contingent of African-born athletes won four of the five men's running events. Its sole native medallist, Mutaz Essa Barshim, gave one of the best performances of the meet with 2.36 m in the men's high jump (one centimetre short of his Asian record) to take his third consecutive title. The host nation China won the most medals overall, with four golds in a haul of twenty. Most of China's medals came from field events, where it had at least one medallist in each event on the men's and women's sides. Kazakhstan ranked a clear third with four champions and twelve medals in total. From the fifteen nations at reached the medal table, Uzbekistan, Kuwait, Japan and Iran were others that frequently featured on the podium.

Four championship records were improved during the course of the two-day competition. Kazakhstan's men's 4×400 m relay team knocked a second off Saudi Arabia's mark from 2008. Maryam Jamal's time in the women's 3000 metres was a six-second improvement from the previous record by compatriot Shitaye Eshete. China's Wu Shuijiao improved her own record from 2012 with a run of 8.02 seconds in the 60 metres hurdles, which was also a Chinese indoor record. Svetlana Radzivil raised the women's high jump best to 1.96 m, erasing Marina Aitova's height of 1.93 m that had stood since 2006.

Four athletes successfully defended their titles from 2012: Dmitriy Karpov in the men's heptathlon, Maryam Tousi in the women's 400 metres, Mutaz Essa Barshim in the men's high jump, and Wu Shuijiao in the women's 60 m hurdles. Mohamad Al-Garni and Maryam Jamal were the only two competitors who won two individual golds, each of them completing a 1500/3000 metres double. Betlhem Desalegn was the women's runner-up in both those events, and sprinter Maryam Tousi was the only other runner to take multiple individual medals.

== Results ==
=== Men ===
Event	Gold		Silver		Bronze	
60 metres	Samuel Francis (QAT)	6.61	Femi Ogunode (QAT)	6.62	Reza Ghasemi (IRI)	6.68
400 metres	Mehdi Zamani (IRI)	48.25	Sergey Zaykov (KAZ)	48.37	Ahmed Mubarak Saleh (OMA)	48.51
800 metres	Musaeb Abdulrahman Balla (QAT)	1:50.27	Ibrahim Al-Zafairi (KUW)	1:50.86	Yasuhiro Nakamura (JPN)	1:50.94
1500 metres	Mohamad Al-Garni (QAT)	3:48.79	Hamza Driouch (QAT)	3:49.55	Omar Al-Rasheedi (KUW)	3:50.79
3000 metres	Mohamad Al-Garni (QAT)	8:08.65	Abubaker Ali Kamal (QAT)	8:09.48	Tetsuya Yoroizaka (JPN)	8:11.73
60 metres hurdles	Abdulaziz Al-Mandeel (KUW)	7.80	Yaqoub Mohamed Al-Youha (KUW)	7.90	Huang Hao (CHN)	7.90
4×400 m relay	Kazakhstan; Dmitriy Korabelnikov; Igor Kondratyev; Omirserik Bekenov; Sergey Zaikov	3:12.94 NR/CR	China; Zhang Huadong; Qin Jian; Chen Jianxin; Zhu Chenbin	3:13.43	Oman; Obaid Al-Quraini; Ahmed Al-Marjabi; Othman Al-Busaidi; Ahmed Mubarak Salah	3:13.49
High jump	Mutaz Essa Barshim (QAT)	2.36 m	Majd Eddin Ghazal (SYR)	2.20 m	Zhang Guowei (CHN)	2.20 m
Pole vault	Hsieh Chia-Han (TPE)	5.15 m	Zhou Bo (CHN)	5.15 m	Ryo Tanaka (JPN)	5.15 m
Long jump	Saleh Abdelaziz Al-Haddad (KUW)	7.94 m NR	Mohammad Arzandeh (IRI)	7.80 m NR	Jie Lei (CHN)	7.76 m
Triple jump	Fu Haitao (CHN)	16.21 m	Roman Valiyev (KAZ)	16.16 m	Ruslan Kurbanov (UZB)	16.00 m
Shot put	Om Prakash Karhana (IND)	19.07 m	Wang Guangfu (CHN)	18.64 m	Li Jun (CHN)	18.52 m
Heptathlon	Dmitriy Karpov (KAZ)	5752 pts	Akihiko Nakamura (JPN)	5693 pts NR	Leonid Andreev (UZB)	5561 pts

=== Women ===
Event	Gold		Silver		Bronze	
60 metres	Tao Yujia (CHN)	7.36	Olga Safronova (KAZ)	7.41	Maryam Tousi (IRI)	7.50
400 metres	Maryam Tousi (IRI)	54.24	Yuliya Rakhmanova (KAZ)	54.37	Olga Andreyeva (KAZ)	55.74
800 metres	Tatyana Yurchenko (KAZ)	2:14.20	Kseniya Faiskanova (KGZ)	2:14.47	Tatyana Neroznak (KAZ)	2:14.61
1500 metres	Maryam Jamal (BHR)	4:19.42	Betlhem Desalegn (UAE)	4:19.83	Viktoria Poludina (KGZ)	4:25.36
3000 metres	Maryam Jamal (BHR)	8:43.16 NR/CR	Betlhem Desalegn (UAE)	8:46.54 NR	Alia Saeed Mohammed (UAE)	8:56.78
60 metres hurdles	Wu Shuijiao (CHN)	8.02 NR/CR	Anastassiya Soprunova (KAZ)	8.27	Sun Yawei (CHN)	8.37
4×400 m relay	Kazakhstan; Elina Mikhina; Tatyana Yurchenko; Olga Andreyeva; Yuliya Rakhmanova	3:42.45	Thailand; Karat Srimuang; Atchima Eng-Chuan; Pornpan Hoemhuk; Treewadee Yongphan	3:42.55	China; Zhou Yanling; Chen Jingwen; Li Manyuan; Wang Huan	3:43.89
High jump	Svetlana Radzivil (UZB)	1.96 m NR/CR	Zheng Xingjuan (CHN)	1.91 m	Zhao Jian (CHN)	1.80 m
Pole vault	Tomomi Abiko (JPN)	4.30 m	Xu Huiqin (CHN) Ren Mengqian (CHN)	4.15 m	Not awarded	
Long jump	Yurina Hiraka (JPN)	6.34 m	Darya Reznichenko (UZB)	6.30 m	Jiang Yanfei (CHN)	6.22 m
Triple jump	Anastasiya Juravleva (UZB)	13.60 m	Aleksandra Kotlyarova (UZB)	13.45 m	Li Xiaohong (CHN)	13.43 m
Shot put	Sofiya Burkhanova (UZB)	16.80 m	Bian Ka (CHN)	16.60 m	Lin Chia-Ying (TPE)	16.52 m
Pentathlon	Wang Qingling (CHN)	4246 pts	Yuliya Tarasova (UZB)	3985 pts	Irina Karpova (KAZ)	3951 pts

== Medal table ==
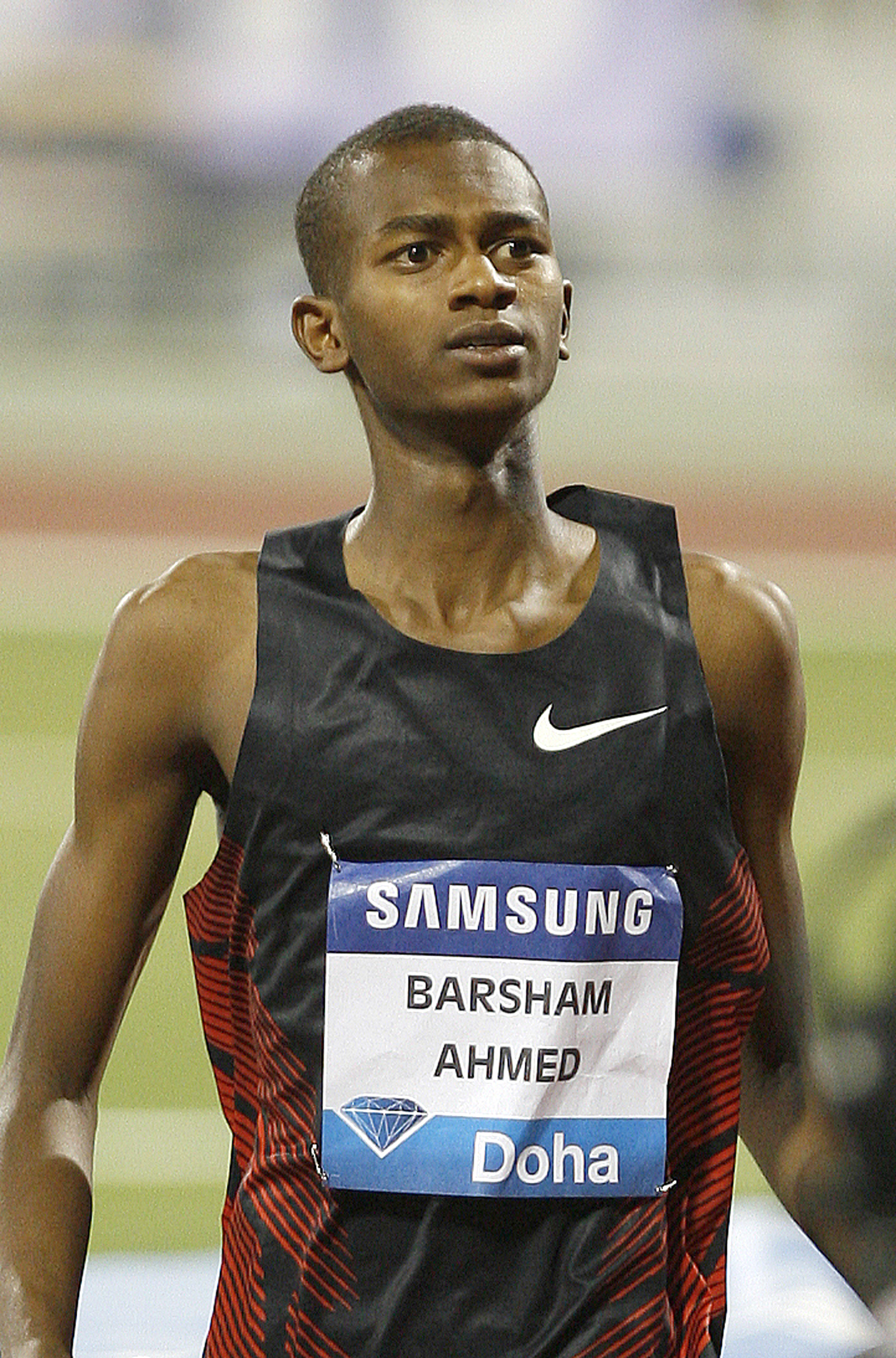
Mutaz Essa Barshim's gold medal in the high jump helped Qatar top the medal table.

* Host nation (China)

Rank	Nation	Gold	Silver	Bronze	Total
1	Qatar	5	3	0	8
2	China*	4	7	9	20
3	Kazakhstan	4	5	3	12
4	Uzbekistan	3	3	2	8
5	Kuwait	2	2	1	5
6	Japan	2	1	3	6
7	Iran	2	1	2	5
8	Bahrain	2	0	0	2
9	Chinese Taipei	1	0	1	2
10	India	1	0	0	1
11	United Arab Emirates	0	2	1	3
12	Kyrgyzstan	0	1	1	2
13	Syria	0	1	0	1
13	Thailand	0	1	0	1
15	Oman	0	0	2	2
Totals (15 entries)		26	27	25	78

== Participating nations ==
- Bahrain (3)
- China (51)
- Chinese Taipei (12)
- Hong Kong (9)
- India (5)
- Indonesia (4)
- Iran (11)
- Iraq (1)
- Japan (12)
- Kazakhstan (20)
- Kyrgyzstan (8)
- Kuwait (7)
- Lebanon (4)
- Macau (6)
- Malaysia (5)
- Mongolia (6)
- Oman (7)
- Pakistan (3)
- Philippines (3)
- Qatar (10)
- Singapore (5)
- South Korea (1)
- Syria (1)
- Thailand (8)
- Tajikistan (1)
- Turkmenistan (5)
- United Arab Emirates (2)
- Uzbekistan (17)

== National records ==
A total of 20 national records were set at the championships. Non-medalling national record performances are listed below.

Gender	Event	Athlete	Nation	Mark
Men	60 metres	Eric Cray	Philippines	6.75/6.77
Men	400 metres	Chan Ka Chun	Hong Kong	49.00
Men	800 metres	Jian Yong Leo Fang	Singapore	1:55.63
Men	60 m hurdles	Arumugam Suresh	India	8.08
Men	60 m hurdles	Rio Maholtra	Indonesia	8.25
Men	Triple jump	Mohamed Youssef Al-Sahabi	Bahrain	15.97
Women	60 metres	Fong Yee Pui	Hong Kong	7.55/7.55
Women	60 metres	Shanti Veronica Pereira	Singapore	7.61/7.62
Women	Long jump	Maria Natalia Londa	Indonesia	6.18

== See also ==
- 2014 IAAF World Indoor Championships
