= Pavel Ivashko =

Russian sprinter (born 1994)

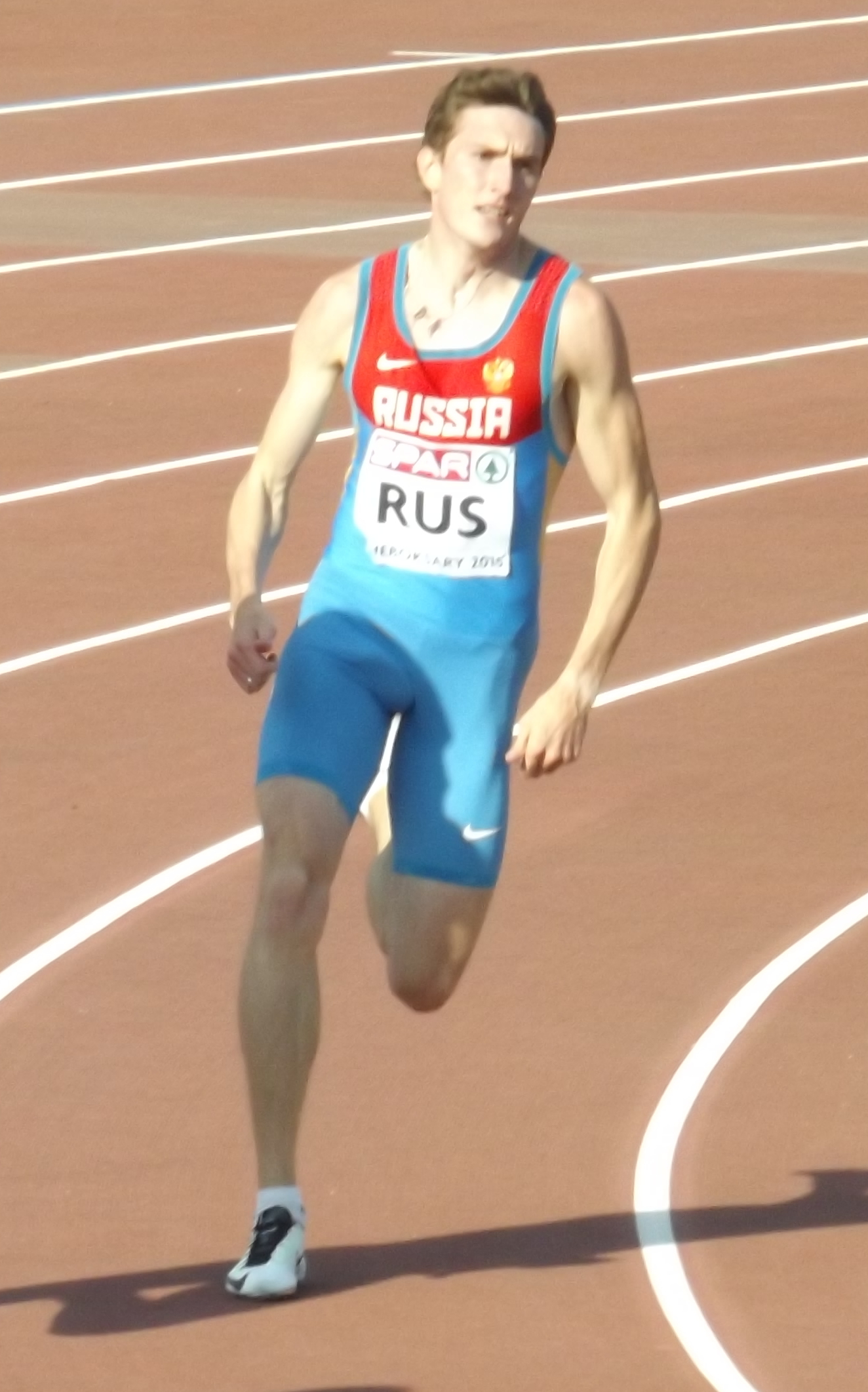
Ivashko at the 2015 European Team Championships

Pavel Aleksandrovich Ivashko (Russian: Павел Александрович Ивашко; born 16 November 1994 in Surgut) is a Russian sprinter specialising in the 400 metres.

Ivashko is serving a four-year doping ban from 7 November 2025, due to evidence from the McLaren Report. His results from 19 May 2014, are disqualified.

== Competition record ==
Year	Competition	Venue	Position	Event	Notes
Representing Russia
2013	European Junior Championships	Rieti, Italy	1st	400 m	45.81
2013	European Junior Championships	Rieti, Italy	1st	4 × 400 m relay	3:04.87
2014	IAAF World Relays	Nassau, Bahamas	17th (h)	4 × 400 m relay	3:05.00
2014	European Championships	Zürich, Switzerland	DQ	4 × 400 m relay	2:59.38
2015	European U23 Championships	Tallinn, Estonia	2nd	400 m	45.73
2015	European U23 Championships	Tallinn, Estonia	–	4 × 400 m relay	DQ
2015	World Championships	Beijing, China	25th (h)	400 m	45.25
2015	World Championships	Beijing, China	8th	4 × 400 m relay	3:03.05
