= Muhammed Anas =

Indian sprinter (born 1994)

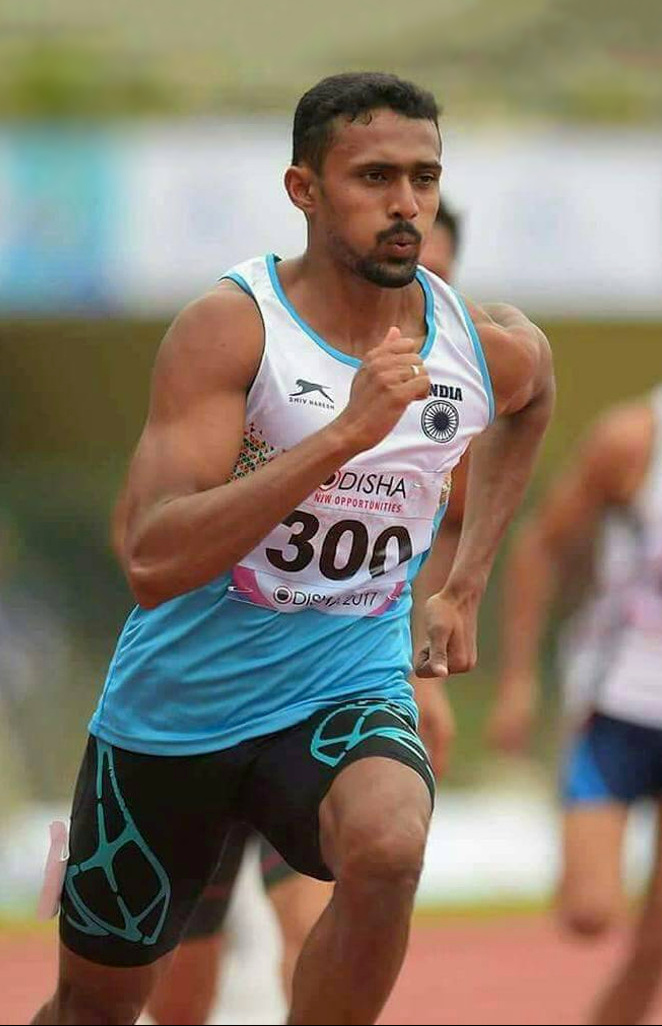
- Anas at the 2017 Asian Championships

Personal information
- Full name: Muhammed Anas Yahiya
- Born: 17 September 1994 (age 32) Nilamel, Kerala, India
- Education: Sree Krishna College
- Height: 1.77 m (5 ft 10 in)
- Military career
- Branch: Indian Navy
- Service years: 2015–present
- Rank: Chief petty officer

Sport
- Sport: Athletics
- Event: 400 m
- Coached by: Galina Bukharina

Achievements and titles
- Personal bests: 45.21 (Kladno, 2019)
Medal record
Men's athletics
Representing India
Asian Games
Gold medal – first place	2018 Jakarta	4×400m mixed
Gold medal – first place	2022 Hangzhou	4×400m
Silver medal – second place	2018 Jakarta	400 m
Silver medal – second place	2018 Jakarta	4×400m
Asian Championships
Gold medal – first place	2017 Bhubaneswar	400 m
Gold medal – first place	2017 Bhubaneswar	4×400m
Silver medal – second place	2019 Doha	4×400m mixed
South Asian Games
Gold medal – first place	2016 Guwahati	4×400m

Muhammed Anas Yahiya (born 17 September 1994) is an Indian sprinter who specializes in 400 m events. Anas has represented India in the 4 × 400 m events at the 2016, 2020 and 2024 Olympic Games.

== Early life ==
He was born on 17 September 1994 in Nilamel. Anas took up athletics at the Style Sports Academy in Nilamel. He initially trained in the long jump, and changed to 400 m by chance, when his school team was looking for a last-minute replacement for a 400 m competition. His younger brother competed in the long jump at the 2017 World University Games.

He studied at Sree Krishna College, which is affiliated to the Calicut University, and represented the university at national level athletics.

== Career ==
Anas earlier broke the national 400 m record at the Polish Athletics Championships in June 2016, clocking 45.40 seconds, the exact qualification mark for the 2016 Olympics. He became the third Indian athlete to qualify for this Olympic event, after Milkha Singh (1956 and 1960) and K. M. Binu (2004).

In July 2016, Anas was part of the relay team that broke the national 4 × 400 metres record in Bangalore and qualified for the Rio Olympics. The quartet of Anas, Kunhu Muhammed, Ayyasamy Dharun and Arokia Rajiv clocked 3:00:91, improving their own record of 3:02.17 set four weeks earlier in Turkey. This result placed them 13th in the world ranking.

At the 2018 Asian Games, Anas won two silver medals and one gold medal, in the individual 400 m, men's 4 × 400 m and mixed 4 × 400 m relays respectively . At the 2018 Commonwealth Games he placed fourth in the 400 m, while in men's 4 × 400 m the team failed to finish.

In 2022 Anas was included in the 4 × 400 m relay team for the 2022 Commonwealth Games by the Athletics Federation of India in place of an injured athlete Rajesh Ramesh.

== Awards and honours ==
In recognition of his contributions to Indian athletics, he received the Arjuna Award in 2019.

In his honour, the Muhammed Anas Athletics Stadium was inaugurated at INS Chilka on 23 August 2025. The stadium features an eight-lane synthetic track, a spectators gallery with a seating capacity of 500, and a football ground.
