= Ali Khadivar =

Iranian sprinter (born 1989)

Ali Khadivar علی خدیور
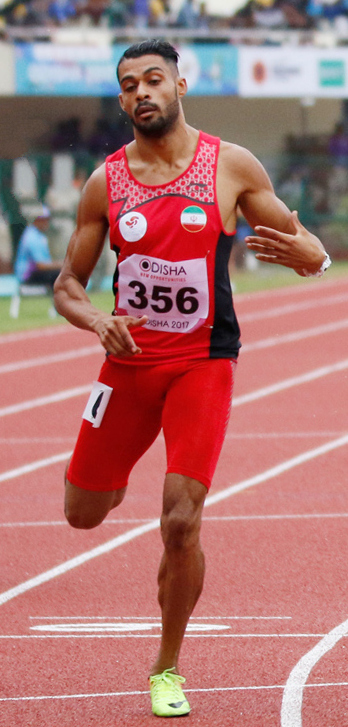
- Khadivar at the 2017 Asian Championships

Personal information
- Born: 11 November 1989 (age 36) Kish, Iran
- Height: 178 cm (5 ft 10 in)
- Weight: 66 kg (146 lb)

Sport
- Sport: Athletics
- Event: 100–400 m
- Coached by: Gentry Bradley

Achievements and titles
- Personal bests: 100 m – 10.38 (2016); 200 m – 20.79 (2016); 400 m – 45.64 (2017, NR)
Medal record
Representing Iran
Islamic Solidarity Games
| Bronze medal – third place | 2017 Baku | 400 m |
Asian Indoor Championships
| Bronze medal – third place | 2018 Tehran | 4×400 m |

Ali Khadivar (Persian: علی خدیور; born 11 November 1989) is an Iranian sprinter. He won an individual bronze medal at the 2017 Islamic Solidarity Games in the 400 m, and holds a national record in this event.
