= Mehdi Zamani =

Iranian sprinter

Medal record

Men's athletics

Representing Iran

Asian Indoor Championships
Gold medal – first place	2010 Tehran	4×400 m
Gold medal – first place	2014 Hangzhou	400 m
Silver medal – second place	2016 Doha	4×400 m

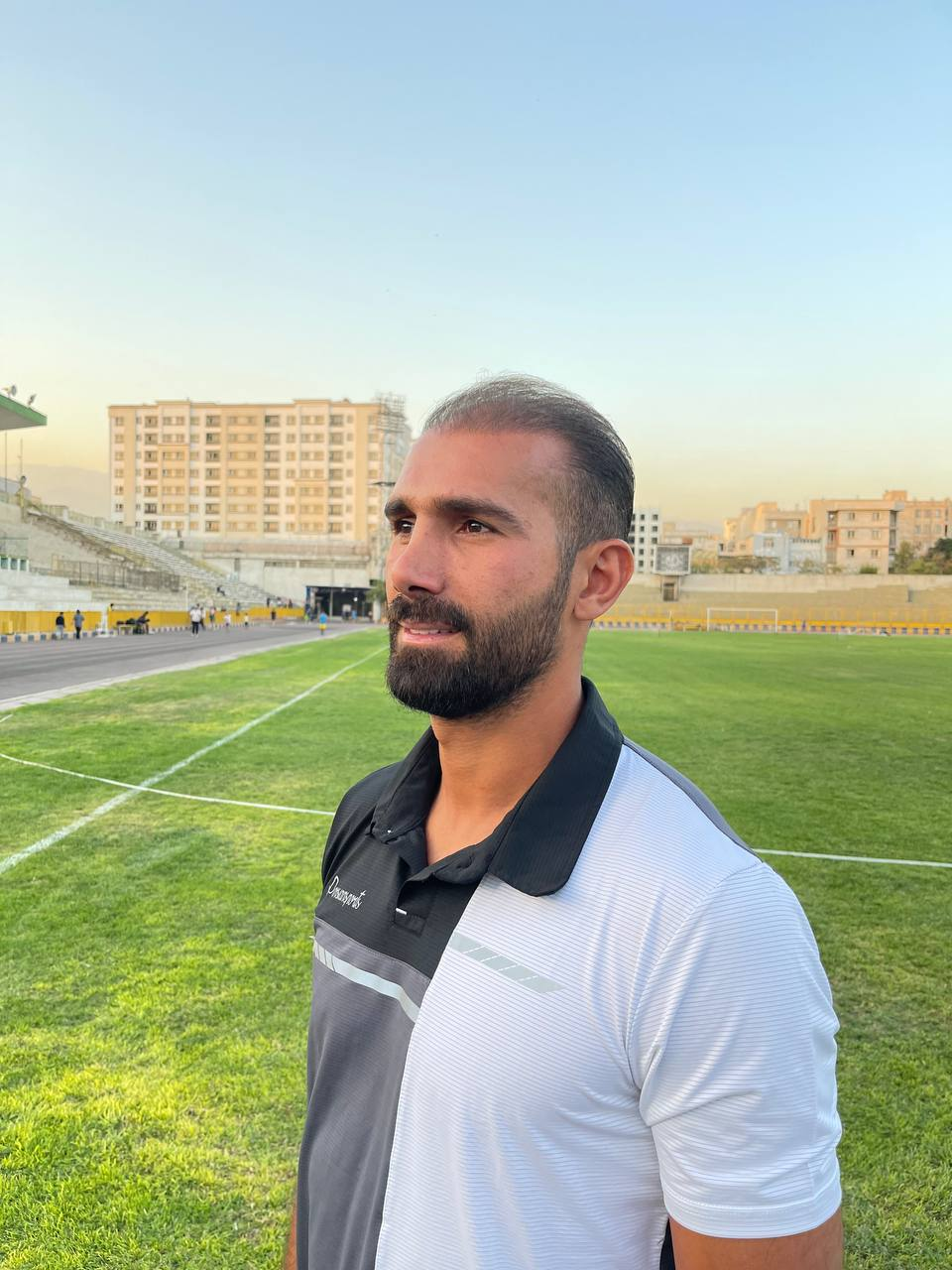
Mehdi Zamani

Mehdi Zamani (Persian: مهدی زمانی; born 20 December 1989) is an Iranian track and field sprinter who specialises in the 400 metres, who was banned for two years for doping.

== Career ==
He started out as an 800 metres runner. He placed sixth in that event at the 2010 Asian Indoor Athletics Championships, held in Tehran, and anchored the 4×400 metres relay team to the gold medal (his first international podium finish).

He was banned from competition for two years from June 2011 to 2013 after a positive doping test for the banned steroid methandienone.

He returned to action in 2013 as a sprint specialist and after the expiry of his doping ban helped break the Iranian record of 39.69 seconds for the 4×100 metres relay, running alongside Reza Ghasemi, Ali Reza Habibi, and Hassan Taftian. At the 2014 Asian Indoor Athletics Championships, he won the individual 400 metres gold medal after setting a personal best of 47.62 seconds to win at the Iranian Championships.

== See also ==
- List of doping cases in athletics
