= Arokia Rajiv =

Indian sprinter

Subedar Arokia Rajiv
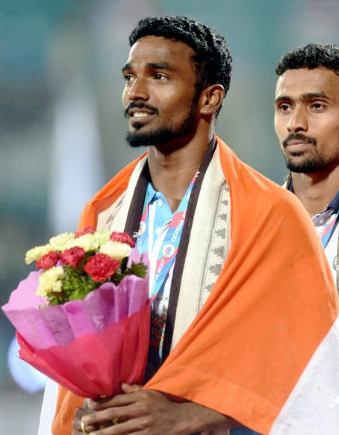
- Rajiv at the 2017 Asian Championships

Personal information
- Full name: Soundararajan Arokia Rajiv
- Nationality: Indian
- Born: 22 May 1991 (age 35) Tiruchirappalli, Tamil Nadu, India
- Height: 175 cm (5 ft 9 in)
- Weight: 65 kg (143 lb)
- Military career
- Allegiance: India
- Branch: Indian Army
- Rank: Subedar
- Unit: 8 Madras
- Awards: Arjuna Award

Sport
- Country: India
- Sport: Track and field
- Event: 400 metres
- Club: Indian Army
- Coached by: Mohammed Kunhi (personal); Bahadur Singh Chauhan (national); Radhakrishnan Nair (national)

Achievements and titles
- Personal best: 45.37 (doha 2019)
Medal record
Representing India
Asian Games
Silver medal – second place	2018 Jakarta	Men's 4×400 m
Gold medal – first place	2018 Jakarta	Mixed 4×400m
Bronze medal – third place	2014 Incheon	400 m
South Asian Games
Gold medal – first place	2016 Guwahati/Shillong	400 m
Gold medal – first place	2016 Guwahati/Shillong	4×400 m
Asian Championships
Silver medal – second place	2017 Bhubaneswar	400 m
Gold medal – first place	2017 Bhubaneswar	4×400 m
Military World Games
Silver medal – second place	2015 Mungyeong	400 m
- Updated on 28 August 2018

Subedar Arokia Rajiv (born 22 May 1991) is an Indian sprinter and a Junior Commissioned Officer (JCO) in Indian Army who specialises in the 400 metres distance. He won silver medals in the men's and mixed 4 × 400 m relays at the 2018 Asian Games and placed third in the individual 400 m in 2014. He won medals in both the 400 m and 4 × 400 m events at the 2016 South Asian Games and 2017 Asian Championships. He competed in the relay at the 2016 Summer Olympics. He competed in the 2020 Tokyo Olympics in the Men's 4 × 400 m relay event where the Indian team broke the Asian and National Records and clocked a time of 3:00.25.

== Early life ==
Rajiv was born in Tiruchirappalli, Tamil Nadu, in a poor family. He studied at the Government Boys Higher Secondary School, Lalgudi, and St. Joseph's College, Tiruchirappalli.

== Career ==
Rajiv began his career as a long jumper before taking to 400 metres. At the 2019 Asian Championship, he Finished 4th Place, clocking 45.37 seconds in the final. In the process, he bettered his previous best of 45.92 seconds, which he had achieved at the Asian Games in Incheon on 28 th September 2014. Enrolled into the 8th Battalion of the Madras Regiment of Indian Army on March 15, 2011, Subedar Arokia Rajiv was honoured by the President of India Ram Nath Kovind in New Delhi with the prestigious Arjuna Award for his outstanding contribution in Athletics in 2017. Subedar Arokia Rajiv becomes the second Arjuna Awardee from the Madras Regiment after Havildar Peter Thangaraj who had received the Award for his outstanding achievements as India's football goalkeeper.

== International competitions ==
Year	Competition	Venue	Position	Event	Notes
Representing India
2013	Asian Championships	Pune, India	6th	400 m	46.63
2013	Asian Championships	Pune, India	4th	4 × 400 m relay	3:06.01
2014	Asian Games	Incheon, South Korea	3rd place, bronze medalist(s)	400 m	45.92
2014	Asian Games	Incheon, South Korea	4th	4 × 400 m relay	3:04.61
2017	Asian Championships	Bhubaneswar, India	2nd place, silver medalist(s)	400 m	46.14
2017	Asian Championships	Bhubaneswar, India	1st place, gold medalist(s)	4 × 400 m relay	3:02.92
2018	Commonwealth Games(Heat 2)	Gold Coast, Australia	H2- 2nd	4 × 400 m relay	3:04.05^{1}

^{1}Did not finish in the final
