= Nimali Liyanarachchi =

Sri Lankan sprinter (born 1989)

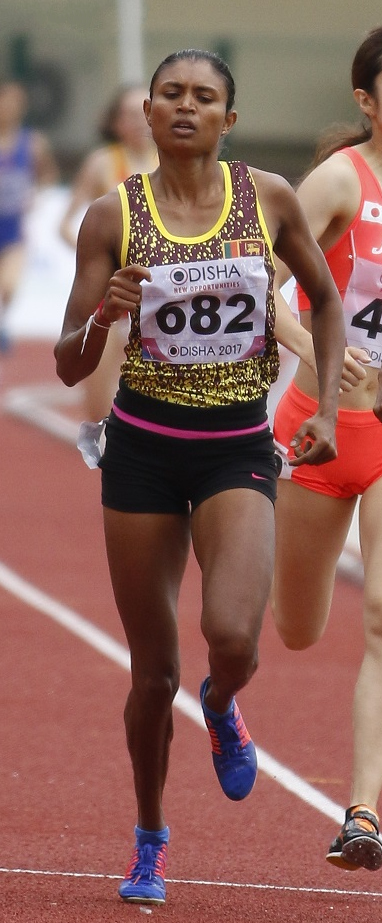
- Nimali at the 2017 Asian Championships

Personal information
- Full name: Nimali Waliwarsha Konda Liyanarachchi
- Born: 19 September 1989 (age 37) Hambantota, Sri Lanka
- Height: 1.6 m (5 ft 3 in)
- Military career
- Branch: Sri Lanka Air Force
- Service years: 2009–present
- Rank: Corporal

Sport
- Sport: Track and field
- Event: Sprint

Achievements and titles
- Personal bests: 400 m: 54.29 (2018); 800 m: 2:02.58 (2017); 800 m (i): 2:04.88 NR (2016); 1500 m: 4:15.86 (2019)
Medal record
Women's athletics
Representing Sri Lanka
Asian Championships
Gold medal – first place	2017 Bhubaneswar	800 m
Bronze medal – third place	2015 Wuhan	800 m
Asian Indoor Championships
Silver medal – second place	2016 Doha	800 m
Bronze medal – third place	2018 Tehran	800 m
South Asian Games
Gold medal – first place	2016 Guwahati	800 m
Silver medal – second place	2016 Guwahati	4×400m
South Asian Championships
Silver medal – second place	2025 Ranchi	1500 m
Military World Games
Silver medal – second place	2019 Wuhan	800 m

Nimali Waliwarsha Konda Liyanarachchi (born 19 September 1989) is a Sri Lankan track and field athlete. She is the national record holder in the women's 800 m indoor event. Nimali represented Sri Lanka in the women's 800 m event at the 2020 Tokyo Olympics.

== Biography ==
She was born in Hambantota, Sooriyaweva. She hails from a family background which involved in farming as both of her parents were farmers. She has two elder brother and one sister. Her father died when she was very young and her family faced many hardships. She studied at the Wewegama Primary School where she completed in many events.

== Career ==
Nimali initially pursued her career in steeplechase. However she later switched to 800m due to gastrointestinal tract issues and with the recommendation of her coach.

She competed at the 2013 Asian Athletics Championships in Pune where she finished fourth in the women's 800 meters with a timing of 2: 05.87 minutes. She represented Sri Lanka at the 2014 Commonwealth Games which also marked her maiden appearance at the Commonwealth Games and was eliminated from the heat in the women's 800m event after finishing at seventh position with a timing of 2:08.31 minutes. She claimed bronze medal in the women's 800m event during the 2015 Asian Athletics Championships in Wuhan after finishing with a timing of 2: 03.94 minutes just behind the Tintu Lukka of India and Zhao Jing from China. It also became the first medal to be claimed by a Sri Lankan athlete in a 800m at an Asian Championship after 22 years since 1993.

She was eliminated from the first round at the 2015 Military World Games in Mungyeong, South Korea, with 2: 10.75 minutes. She claimed a silver medal in 800m event at the 2016 Asian Indoor Athletics Championships in Doha with a new national record of 2: 4.88 minutes. She represented Sri Lanka at the 2016 South Asian Games which was held in Guwahati and claimed gold medal in 800m event with a timing of 2: 09.40 minutes. She was also part of the Sri Lankan 4 × 400 meter relay which clinched silver medal after finishing with 3: 38.89 minutes. She set the then national record in women's 800m event in 2016 with a timing of 2:02.58 seconds breaking the 24 year national record held by Dhammika Menike who clocked at 2:03.05 seconds.

She claimed gold medal in the women's 800m event at the 2017 Asian Athletics Championships in Bhubaneswar after finishing with a timing of 2: 05.23 minutes while incidentally her compatriot Gayanthika Abeyrathne settled for silver medal in the same event. Nimali became the first Sri Lankan to win a women's 800m title at the Asian Championships. During the same year's Asian Championships, in the women's 800m heat event the winning athlete was disqualified after Liyanarachchi argued that she had been unfairly jostled in the sprint for the line.

She also competed at the 2017 World Championships in Athletics in London, where she was eliminated in the preliminary round of women's 800m event after finishing with 2: 08.49 minutes. She also became the first Sri Lankan athlete to compete in women's 800m event at a World Athletics Championships. The following year, she won the bronze medal behind the Chinese duo Wang Chunyu and Hu Zhiying at the 2018 Asian Indoor Athletics Championships in Tehran with a timing of 2:10.83 minutes. She also represented Sri Lanka at the 2018 Commonwealth Games in the Gold Coast and was eliminated in the heat competing in 800m event with a timing of 2: 08.52 minutes. At the 2018 Asian Games held in Jakarta she was eliminated after securing fourth place in the 800m heat event finishing with timing of 2: 06.74 minutes.

She captained Sri Lankan contingent for the 2019 Asian Athletics Championships which was held at Khalifa Stadium in Doha. During the event, she failed to defend her title in women's 800m event finishing at seventh place with a timing of 2: 08.69 minutes and was part of Sri Lankan 4 × 400 meter relay team which finished at fourth place. During the 23rd Asian Athletics Championships on the final day of the competition, she along with Nadeesha Ramanayaka, Dilshi Kumarasinghe and Upamalika Ratnakumari set the new Sri Lankan national record for 4 × 400 meter relay with a record timing of 3: 35.06 seconds.

She also represented Sri Lanka at the 2019 Military World Games and claimed silver medal in the 800 meters just behind Ukrainian Natalija Krol with a timing of 2: 06.14 minutes. In addition, she finished eighth in the 1500 meter run in 4: 31.85 minutes and was fourth in the relay in 3: 43.33 minutes. She was injured in a road accident prior to the 2019 South Asian Games and was ruled out of the tournament. She broke the women's 1500m national record at the 97th National Athletics Championships in 2019 with a timing of 4:15.86 minutes. She was also one of the athletes among the Sri Lankan contingent to have participated at the 60th National Inter-State Athletics Championships in New Delhi, India as part of the preparations prior to the 2020 Olympics and claimed bronze medal in the 800m event.

As of March 2021, she was ranked among top 60 athletes in the world according to World Athletics in the Road to Olympics rankings. She received the Universality Place from the World Athletics to compete at the 2020 Summer Olympics. She would represent Sri Lanka at the 2020 Summer Olympics in the women's 800m event and it marked her debut appearance at the Olympics. It was revealed that Nimali qualified to Tokyo Olympics only after Nilani Ratnayake had failed to qualify for the 2020 Olympics in the women's 3000m steeplechase. She was also the only Sri Lankan female track and field athlete to compete at the Tokyo Olympics. Nimali was also the first Sri Lankan track and field athlete to compete in women's 800m event at the Olympics after 29 years as Sriyani Dhammika Menike was the last to have competed in the relevant discipline. She could not proceed to the next round in the women's 800m after securing an 8th-place finish in the heat event.

== Controversies ==
On 31 July 2021, a social media post was shared more than 7000 times which indicates the photo of Nimali Liyanarachchi having her name tagged with safety pins on her jersey during the women's 800m event. The post also included that 60 sports officials had accompanied the Sri Lankan contingent for the Olympics and as a result the resources for the athletes had been stretched. However, the social media post was deemed to be misleading as only 20 sports officials had accompanied Sri Lankan Olympians.

Sports minister Namal Rajapaksa during a parliamentary session, insisted that Nimali had forgotten her running shoes prior to competing in the women's 800m heat event at the Tokyo Olympics. However, Nimali refuted the allegations stating that she had brought her spikes in her hand luggage for the Games and she revealed that false and misinformation was conveyed to Namal Rajapaksa.
