= 2013 Asian Athletics Championships – Women's 800 metres =

The women's 800 metres event at the 2013 Asian Athletics Championships was held at the Shree Shiv Chhatrapati Sports Complex on 7 July.

== Results ==
Rank	Name	Nationality	Time	Notes
1st place, gold medalist(s)	Wang Chunyu	China	2:02.47	
2nd place, silver medalist(s)	Genzeb Shumi	Bahrain	2:04.16	
3rd place, bronze medalist(s)	Tintu Luka	India	2:04.48	
4	Liyanarachchi Nimali	Sri Lanka	2:05.87	
5	Do Thi Thao	Vietnam	2:06.31	
6	Sushma Devi	India	2:06.87	
7	Gomathi M.	India	2:10.74	
8	Gulshanoi Satarova	Kyrgyzstan	2:12.86	
9	Lodkeo Inthakoumman	Laos	2:29.96	
10	Agueda Fernandes da Costa	Timor-Leste	2:55.03	
