= Athletics at the 2018 Commonwealth Games – Women's long jump =

Women's long jump at the 2018 Commonwealth Games
- Venue: Carrara Stadium
- Dates: 11 April (qualifying round); 12 April (final)
- Competitors: 18 from 13 nations
- Winning distance: 6.84 m

Medalists
gold medal	Christabel Nettey	Canada
silver medal	Brooke Stratton	Australia
bronze medal	Shara Proctor	England

The women's long jump at the 2018 Commonwealth Games, as part of the athletics programme, took place in the Carrara Stadium on 11 and 12 April 2018.

== Records ==
Prior to this competition, the existing world and Games records were as follows:

World record	Galina Chistyakova (URS)	7.52 m	Leningrad, Soviet Union	11 June 1988
Games record	Bronwyn Thompson (AUS)	6.97 m	Melbourne, Australia	24 March 2006

== Schedule ==
The schedule was as follows:

Date	Time	Round
Wednesday 11 April 2018	19:00	Qualification
Thursday 12 April 2018	19:55	Final

All times are Australian Eastern Standard Time (UTC+10)

== Results ==
=== Qualifying round ===
Across two groups, those who jumped ≥6.60 m (Q) or at least the 12 best performers (q) advanced to the final.

Rank	Group	Name	#1	#2	#3	Result	Notes	Qual.
1	A	Shara Proctor (ENG)	6.89; 0.0 m/s			6.89	SB	Q
2	A	Christabel Nettey (CAN)	6.79 +0.6 m/s			6.79		Q
3	B	Brooke Stratton (AUS)	6.73; 0.0 m/s			6.73		Q
4	A	Nektaria Panagi (CYP)	x -0.3 m/s	6.63 +0.5 m/s		6.63		Q
5	A	Jazmin Sawyers (ENG)	6.24 -0.2 m/s	x +0.5 m/s	6.47 -0.1 m/s	6.47		q
6	B	Lauren Wells (AUS)	5.88 +0.2 m/s	6.44 +0.4 m/s	6.46 +0.2 m/s	6.46		q
7	A	Naa Anang (AUS)	6.39; 0.0 m/s	6.46 +0.8 m/s	6.37 -0.2 m/s	6.46		q
8	B	Lorraine Ugen (ENG)	6.42 +0.1 m/s	x +0.2 m/s	x +1.1 m/s	6.42		q
9	B	Nayana James (IND)	6.21 +0.1 m/s	6.34 +0.8 m/s	x +0.3 m/s	6.34		q
10	B	Chantel Malone (IVB)	6.29 -0.1 m/s	x +1.2 m/s	x -0.2 m/s	6.29		q
11	B	Bianca Stuart (BAH)	x +0.1 m/s	x +0.8 m/s	6.27 +0.3 m/s	6.27		q
12	A	Nellickal V. Neena (IND)	6.17 +1.4 m/s	x +0.6 m/s	6.24 +0.7 m/s	6.24		q
13	A	Rellie Kaputin (PNG)	6.18 +0.1 m/s	x +0.9 m/s	x 0.0 m/s	6.18		
14	B	Precious Okoronkwor (NGR)	x +0.2 m/s	x +1.0 m/s	6.12 -0.1 m/s	6.12		
15	A	Joelle Sandrine Mbumi Nkouindjin (CMR)	6.02 +0.7 m/s	5.89 +0.2 m/s	6.01 -0.2 m/s	6.02		
16	B	Rebecca Chapman (WAL)	5.94 +0.1 m/s	6.02 +0.5 m/s	4.42 +0.6 m/s	6.02		
17	B	Priscilla Tabunda (KEN)	x +0.8 m/s	5.68 +0.2 m/s	x +0.7 m/s	5.68		
18	A	Mariah Toussaint (DMA)	5.64 -0.1 m/s	5.57 +0.6 m/s	5.67; 0.0 m/s	5.67		

=== Final ===
The medals were determined in the final.

Rank	Name	#1	#2	#3	#4	#5	#6	Result	Notes
1st place, gold medalist(s)	Christabel Nettey (CAN)	6.84 +0.2 m/s	6.79 -0.3 m/s	6.64; 0.0 m/s	6.68; 0.0 m/s	6.65 -0.1 m/s	2.77 +0.1 m/s	6.84	
2nd place, silver medalist(s)	Brooke Stratton (AUS)	x -0.8 m/s	6.64 +0.3 m/s	6.72 -0.5 m/s	x 0.0 m/s	6.75; 0.0 m/s	6.77 +0.6 m/s	6.77	
3rd place, bronze medalist(s)	Shara Proctor (ENG)	x -0.7 m/s	6.45; 0.0 m/s	6.28 -0.4 m/s	6.75 -0.1 m/s	–	–	6.75	
4	Lorraine Ugen (ENG)	6.35 -0.6 m/s	x 0.0 m/s	x -0.1 m/s	x 0.0 m/s	x 0.0 m/s	6.69 +0.2 m/s	6.69	
5	Chantel Malone (IVB)	6.29 -0.1 m/s	6.28 -0.5 m/s	x 0.0 m/s	6.19; 0.0 m/s	6.48 -0.1 m/s	6.35 +0.1 m/s	6.48	
6	Nektaria Panagi (CYP)	x -0.1 m/s	6.44 -0.2 m/s	6.19 +0.1 m/s	6.39; 0.0 m/s	x -0.1 m/s	6.34 +0.4 m/s	6.44	
7	Jazmin Sawyers (ENG)	x -1.2 m/s	6.19 +0.2 m/s	6.27 -0.1 m/s	6.19 +0.1 m/s	x 0.0 m/s	6.35 -0.7 m/s	6.35	
8	Bianca Stuart (BAH)	6.27 -0.8 m/s	x 0.0 m/s	6.29 -0.4 m/s	6.25 +0.3 m/s	6.30 +0.2 m/s	x -0.7 m/s	6.30	
9	Naa Anang (AUS)	x +0.2 m/s	x -0.1 m/s	6.22; 0.0 m/s	—			6.22	
10	Nellickal V. Neena (IND)	5.90 -0.8 m/s	6.01 -0.1 m/s	6.19 -0.4 m/s	—			6.19	
11	Lauren Wells (AUS)	6.16; 0.0 m/s	6.08 -0.5 m/s	x -0.1 m/s	—			6.16	
12	Nayana James (IND)	6.14; 0.0 m/s	6.05 -0.3 m/s	6.05 -0.1 m/s	—			6.14	
