= Athletics at the 2010 Asian Games – Women's 800 metres =

Women's 800 metres at the 2010 Asian Games
- Venue: Aoti Main Stadium
- Dates: 24–25 November 2010
- Competitors: 17 from 13 nations

Medalists
gold medal	Margarita Matsko	Kazakhstan
silver medal	Trương Thanh Hằng	Vietnam
bronze medal	Tintu Luka	India

The women's 800 metres event at the 2010 Asian Games was held at the Aoti Main Stadium, Guangzhou, China on 24–25 November.

== Schedule ==
All times are China Standard Time (UTC+08:00)

Date	Time	Event
Wednesday, 24 November 2010	18:25	Round 1
Thursday, 25 November 2010	17:25	Final

== Records ==
Prior to this competition, the existing world, Asian and Games records were as follows.

World Record	Jarmila Kratochvílová (TCH)	1:53.28	Munich, West Germany	26 July 1983
Asian Record	Liu Dong (CHN)	1:55.54	Beijing, China	9 September 1993
Games Record	Qu Yunxia (CHN)	1:59.85	Hiroshima, Japan	12 October 1994

== Results ==
Legend

- DNS — Did not start

=== Round 1 ===
- Qualification: First 2 in each heat (Q) and the next 2 fastest (q) advance to the final.

==== Heat 1 ====
Rank	Athlete	Time	Notes
1	Margarita Matsko (KAZ)	2:03.23	Q
2	Trương Thanh Hằng (VIE)	2:03.28	Q
3	Sinimole Paulose (IND)	2:03.83	q
4	Akari Kishikawa (JPN)	2:04.20	q
5	Leila Ebrahimi (IRI)	2:13.34	
—	Suzana Zukhairi (YEM)	DNS	

==== Heat 2 ====
Rank	Athlete	Time	Notes
1	Tintu Luka (IND)	2:03.85	Q
2	Genzeb Shumi (BRN)	2:04.09	Q
3	Viktoriya Yalovtseva (KAZ)	2:04.27	
4	Huh Yeon-jung (KOR)	2:07.99	
5	Aye Aye Than (MYA)	2:12.82	
6	Luiza Kutueva (KGZ)	2:13.07	

==== Heat 3 ====
Rank	Athlete	Time	Notes
1	Maryam Yusuf Jamal (BRN)	2:04.54	Q
2	Ruriko Kubo (JPN)	2:05.09	Q
3	Zhang Liqiu (CHN)	2:07.04	
4	Inam Khazaal (IRQ)	2:09.62	
5	Betlhem Desalegn (UAE)	2:10.80	

=== Final ===
Rank	Athlete	Time	Notes
1st place, gold medalist(s)	Margarita Matsko (KAZ)	2:00.29	
2nd place, silver medalist(s)	Trương Thanh Hằng (VIE)	2:00.91	
3rd place, bronze medalist(s)	Tintu Luka (IND)	2:01.36	
4	Akari Kishikawa (JPN)	2:03.73	
5	Ruriko Kubo (JPN)	2:04.52	
6	Maryam Yusuf Jamal (BRN)	2:06.07	
7	Sinimole Paulose (IND)	2:06.95	
8	Genzeb Shumi (BRN)	2:08.38	
