= 2019 Asian Athletics Championships – Women's 800 metres =

Women's 800 metres at the 2019 Asian Athletics Championships
- Venue: Khalifa International Stadium
- Location: Doha, Qatar
- Dates: 21 April (heats); 22 April (final)
- Competitors: 15 from 11 nations
- Winning time: 2:02.70

Medalists
gold medal	Gomathi Marimuthu	India
silver medal	Wang Chunyu	China
bronze medal	Margarita Mukasheva	Kazakhstan

The women's 800 metres at the 2019 Asian Athletics Championships was held on 21 and 22 April.

== Records ==
Records before the 2019 Asian Athletics Championships
Record	Athlete (nation)	Time (s)	Location	Date
World record	Jarmila Kratochvílová (TCH)	1:53.28	Munich, West Germany	26 July 1983
Asian record	Liu Dong (CHN)	1:55.54	Beijing, China	9 September 1993
Championship record	Zhang Jian (CHN)	2:01.16	Fukuoka, Japan	21 July 1998
World leading	Ajeé Wilson (USA)	1:58.60	New York City, United States	9 February 2019
Asian leading	No times recorded			

== Results ==
=== Heats ===
Qualification rule: First 3 in each heat (Q) and the next 2 fastest (q) qualified for the final.

Rank	Heat	Name	Nationality	Time	Notes
1	1	Wang Chunyu	China	2:04.93	Q
2	1	Gomathi Marimuthu	India	2:04.96	Q
3	1	Margarita Mukasheva	Kazakhstan	2:05.08	Q, SB
4	1	Nimali Waliwarsha	Sri Lanka	2:05.10	q
5	2	Gayanthika Abeyratne	Sri Lanka	2:05.20	Q
6	2	Ayano Shiomi	Japan	2:05.33	Q
7	2	Hu Zhiying	China	2:06.63	Q
8	1	Marta Hirpato	Bahrain	2:06.69	q
9	2	Twinkle Chaudhary	India	2:07.00	
10	2	Varvara Lissichkina	Kazakhstan	2:08.17	
11	2	Angela Freitas De Fatima Araujo	Timor-Leste	2:08.88	PB
12	1	Khuất Phương Anh	Vietnam	2:11.08	SB
13	1	Toktam Dastarbandan	Iran	2:11.50	NR
14	1	Goh Chui Ling	Singapore	2:11.66	PB
15	2	Danah Al-Nasrallah	Kuwait	2:13.80	SB

=== Final ===
Rank	Name	Nationality	Time	Notes
1st place, gold medalist(s)	Gomathi Marimuthu	India	2:02.70	PB
2nd place, silver medalist(s)	Wang Chunyu	China	2:02.96	SB
3rd place, bronze medalist(s)	Margarita Mukasheva	Kazakhstan	2:03.83	SB
4	Gayanthika Abeyratne	Sri Lanka	2:05.74	
5	Marta Hirpato	Bahrain	2:07.59	
6	Ayano Shiomi	Japan	2:07.70	
7	Nimali Waliwarsha	Sri Lanka	2:08.69	
8	Hu Zhiying	China	2:10.36	
