= Athletics at the 2018 Asian Games – Women's long jump =

Women's long jump at the 2018 Asian Games
- Venue: Gelora Bung Karno Stadium
- Date: 27 August 2018
- Competitors: 11 from 8 nations

Medalists
gold medal	Bùi Thị Thu Thảo	Vietnam
silver medal	Neena Varakil	India
bronze medal	Xu Xiaoling	China

The women's long jump competition at the 2018 Asian Games took place on 27 August 2018 at the Gelora Bung Karno Stadium.

== Schedule ==
All times are Western Indonesia Time (UTC+07:00)

Date	Time	Event
Monday, 27 August 2018	18:40	Final

== Records ==
Prior to this competition, the existing world, Asian and Games records were as follows.

World Record	Galina Chistyakova (URS)	7.52	Leningrad, Soviet Union	11 June 1988
Asian Record	Yao Weili (CHN)	7.01	Jinan, China	5 June 1993
Games Record	Yao Weili (CHN)	6.91	Hiroshima, Japan	15 October 1994

== Results ==
Rank	Athlete	Attempt						Result	Notes
Rank	Athlete	1	2	3	4	5	6	Result	Notes
1st place, gold medalist(s)	Bùi Thị Thu Thảo (VIE)	6.55; 0.0	X −0.2	X +0.2	6.49; 0.0	6.52; 0.0	4.67 −0.1	6.55	
2nd place, silver medalist(s)	Neena Varakil (IND)	6.41 +0.2	6.40 +0.3	6.50; 0.0	6.51; 0.0	6.46 +0.6	6.50; 0.0	6.51	
3rd place, bronze medalist(s)	Xu Xiaoling (CHN)	6.31; 0.0	6.24 +0.1	6.49; 0.0	6.50 +0.1	X −0.2	6.39; 0.0	6.50	
4	Lu Minjia (CHN)	6.50 −0.4	6.32 −0.5	X +0.1	6.37; 0.0	6.32 +0.5	6.43; 0.0	6.50	
5	Maria Natalia Londa (INA)	5.91 +0.7	6.26 +0.6	6.44; 0.0	6.29 +0.4	6.45 −0.1	6.33; 0.0	6.45	
6	Kim Min-ji (KOR)	6.14; 0.0	6.17 −0.3	X +0.7	6.20 +0.2	6.27 +0.4	X +0.1	6.27	
7	Parinya Chuaimaroeng (THA)	6.26 +0.1	X +0.6	—	6.04 +0.1	—	X 0.0	6.26	
8	Nguyễn Thị Trúc Mai (VIE)	6.18 +0.1	6.06 −0.4	X +0.1	6.10 +0.1	6.06 −0.3	6.19; 0.0	6.19	
9	Marestella Sunang (PHI)	6.15 +0.5	X +0.2	6.03; 0.0				6.15	
10	Nayana James (IND)	6.08 −0.2	6.14; 0.0	X −0.1				6.14	
11	Anna Bulanova (KGZ)	6.09 +0.4	5.97 +0.3	5.96; 0.0				6.09	
