= Athletics at the 2018 Asian Games – Women's 800 metres =

Women's 800 metres at the 2018 Asian Games
- Venue: Gelora Bung Karno Stadium
- Date: 27–28 August 2018
- Competitors: 20 from 17 nations

Medalists
gold medal	Wang Chunyu	China
silver medal	Margarita Mukasheva	Kazakhstan
bronze medal	Manal El-Bahraoui	Bahrain

The women's 800 metres competition at the 2018 Asian Games took place on 27 and 28 August 2018 at the Gelora Bung Karno Stadium.

== Schedule ==
All times are Western Indonesia Time (UTC+07:00)

Date	Time	Event
Monday, 27 August 2018	10:00	Round 1
Tuesday, 28 August 2018	19:30	Final

== Records ==
Prior to this competition, the existing world, Asian and Games records were as follows.

World Record	Jarmila Kratochvílová (TCH)	1:53.28	Munich, West Germany	26 July 1983
Asian Record	Liu Dong (CHN)	1:55.54	Beijing, China	9 September 1993
Games Record	Margarita Mukasheva (KAZ)	1:59.02	Incheon, South Korea	1 October 2014

== Results ==
=== Round 1 ===
- Qualification: First 2 in each heat (Q) and the next 2 fastest (q) advance to the final.

==== Heat 1 ====
Rank	Athlete	Time	Notes
1	Marta Hirpato (BRN)	2:04.35	Q
2	Ayano Shiomi (JPN)	2:04.46	Q
3	Margarita Mukasheva (KAZ)	2:04.52	q
4	Nimali Liyanarachchi (SRI)	2:06.74	
5	Kim Ga-kyeong (KOR)	2:15.09	
6	Lodkeo Inthakoumman (LAO)	2:16.09	
7	Sumi Aktar (BAN)	2:26.59	

==== Heat 2 ====
Rank	Athlete	Time	Notes
1	Wang Chunyu (CHN)	2:08.99	Q
2	Vũ Thị Ly (VIE)	2:10.50	Q
3	Gulshanoi Satarova (KGZ)	2:11.22	
4	Chuluunkhüügiin Shinetsetseg (MGL)	2:15.91	
5	Rabia Ashiq (PAK)	2:22.56	
6	Miznah Al-Nassar (KSA)	2:46.62	

==== Heat 3 ====
Rank	Athlete	Time	Notes
1	Manal El-Bahraoui (BRN)	2:05.23	Q
2	Yume Kitamura (JPN)	2:05.31	Q
3	Gayanthika Abeyratne (SRI)	2:06.31	q
4	Angela Araújo (TLS)	2:10.02	
5	Agustina Mardika Manik (INA)	2:10.21	
6	Saraswati Bhattarai (NEP)	2:12.85	
7	Aminath Jaaisha Juneez (MDV)	2:34.54	

=== Final ===
Rank	Athlete	Time	Notes
1st place, gold medalist(s)	Wang Chunyu (CHN)	2:01.80	
2nd place, silver medalist(s)	Margarita Mukasheva (KAZ)	2:02.40	
3rd place, bronze medalist(s)	Manal El-Bahraoui (BRN)	2:02.69	
4	Yume Kitamura (JPN)	2:03.88	
5	Ayano Shiomi (JPN)	2:04.57	
6	Gayanthika Abeyratne (SRI)	2:05.50	
7	Marta Hirpato (BRN)	2:08.12	
8	Vũ Thị Ly (VIE)	2:12.41	
