= 2011 Asian Athletics Championships – Women's 800 metres =

The women's 800 metres at the 2011 Asian Athletics Championships was held at the Kobe Universiade Memorial Stadium on 10 July.

== Results ==
| Rank | Name | Nationality | Time | Notes |
|---|---|---|---|---|
| 1st place, gold medalist(s) | Truong Thanh Hang | Vietnam | 2:01.41 | |
| 2nd place, silver medalist(s) | Margarita Matsko | Kazakhstan | 2:02.46 | |
| 3rd place, bronze medalist(s) | Tintu Luka | India | 2:02.55 | |
| 4 | Ruriko Kubo | Japan | 2:03.34 | |
| 5 | Genzeb Shumi Regasa | Bahrain | 2:03.39 | |
| 6 | Viktoriya Yalovtseva | Kazakhstan | 2:04.66 | |
| 7 | Anna Sidorova | Uzbekistan | 2:04.75 | |
| 8 | Akari Kishikawa | Japan | 2:04.87 | |
| | Inam Al-Sudani | Iraq | DNF | |
