= Zhou Haiyan =

Chinese middle-distance runner (born 1990)

Medal record

Women's athletics

Representing China

Asian Athletics Championships
Gold medal – first place	2009 Guangdong	800 metres
Gold medal – first place	2009 Guangdong	1500 metres

Zhou Haiyan (Chinese: 周海燕; born 3 January 1990) is a Chinese track and field athlete who competes in middle-distance events. She holds personal bests of 2:03.00 and 4:13.32 minutes for the 800 metres and 1500 metres events, respectively. She was the champion in both races at the 2009 Asian Athletics Championships.

Born in Liaoning, she first competed on the Chinese Athletics Grand Prix circuit at age sixteen and took wins over both 800 metres and 1500 metres in Guilin. She came first in the 800 m at the Chinese Olympic trials, but did attain the qualifying standard time for the 2008 Beijing Olympics. She finished sixth at the Chinese Athletics Championships later that year.

She reached the peak of her career in 2009. Over 800 m she went undefeated nationally, winning twice on the Grand Prix circuit and taking the titles at both the Chinese Championships and the 11th Chinese National Games, setting a personal best of 2:03.00 minutes at the latter meeting. She also achieved a personal best of 4:13.32 minutes for the 1500 m, which brought her second place at the national championships. At the 2009 Asian Athletics Championships Zhou came out on top of a tactical 1500 m race to win the 1500 m gold in 4:32.74 minutes (the slowest winning time for the championship). A sprint finish in the 800 m saw her edge Margarita Matsko to first place, making Zhou a double Asian middle-distance champion.

Her form dropped in 2010 (she did not win a race nationally that year) and she skipped the 2011 season. She ranked outside the top ten nationally in both 2011 and 2012.
