= 2017 Asian Athletics Championships – Women's 800 metres =

The women's 800 metres at the 2017 Asian Athletics Championships was held on 8 and 9 July.

== Medalists ==
Gold	Nimali Liyanarachchi; Sri Lanka
Silver	Gayanthika Abeyrathne; Sri Lanka
Bronze	Fumika Omori; Japan

== Results ==
=== Heats ===
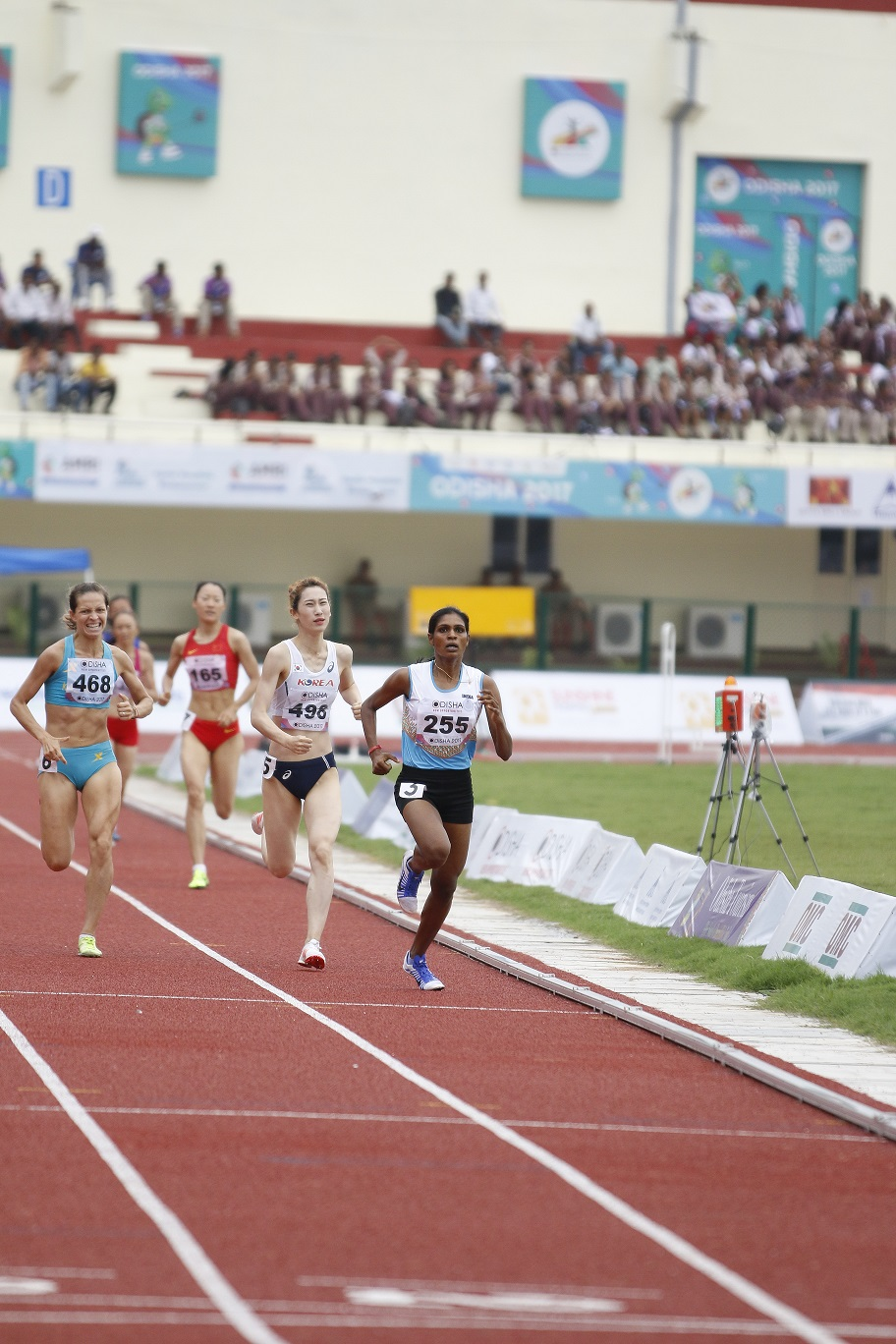
Heat 1

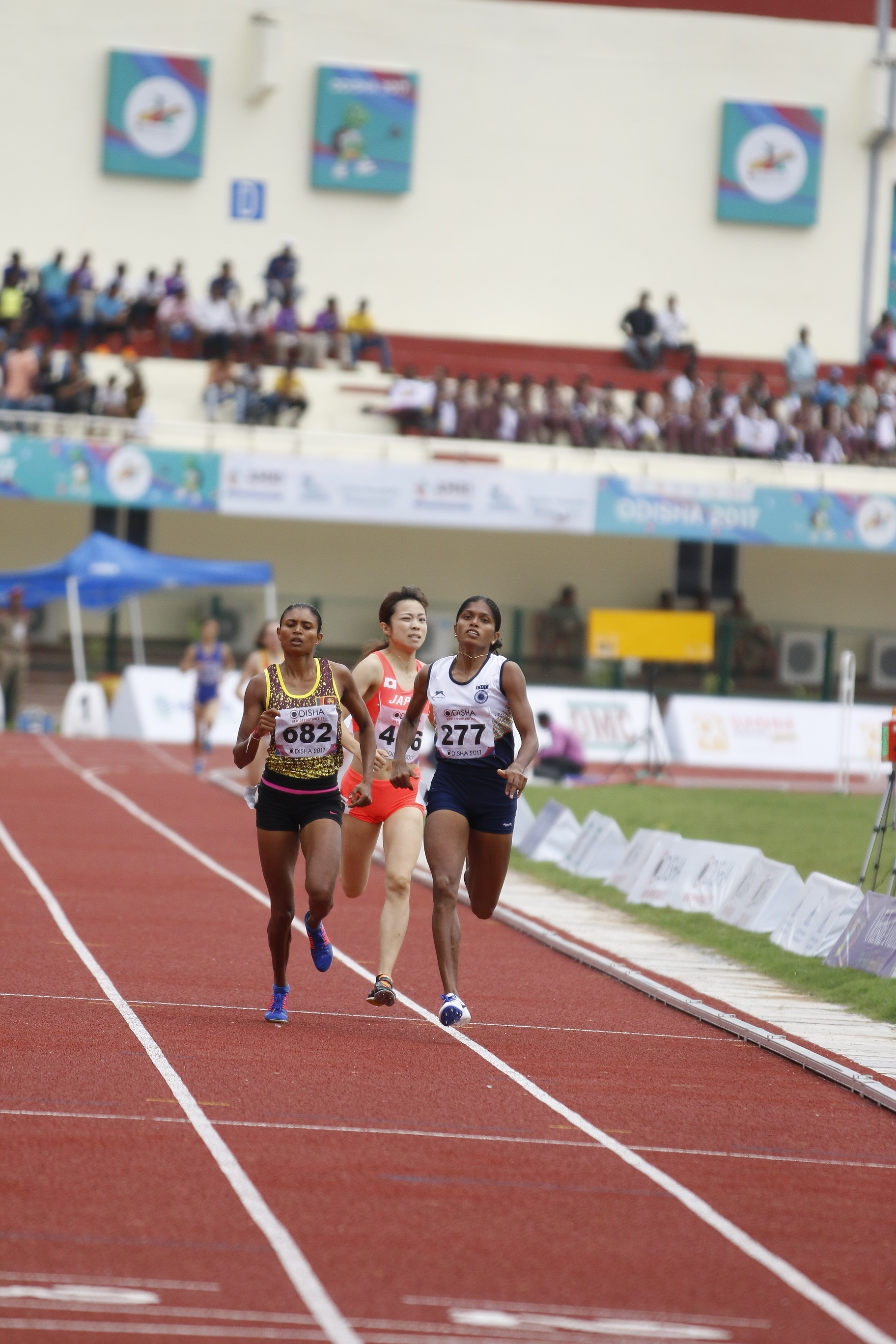
Heat 2

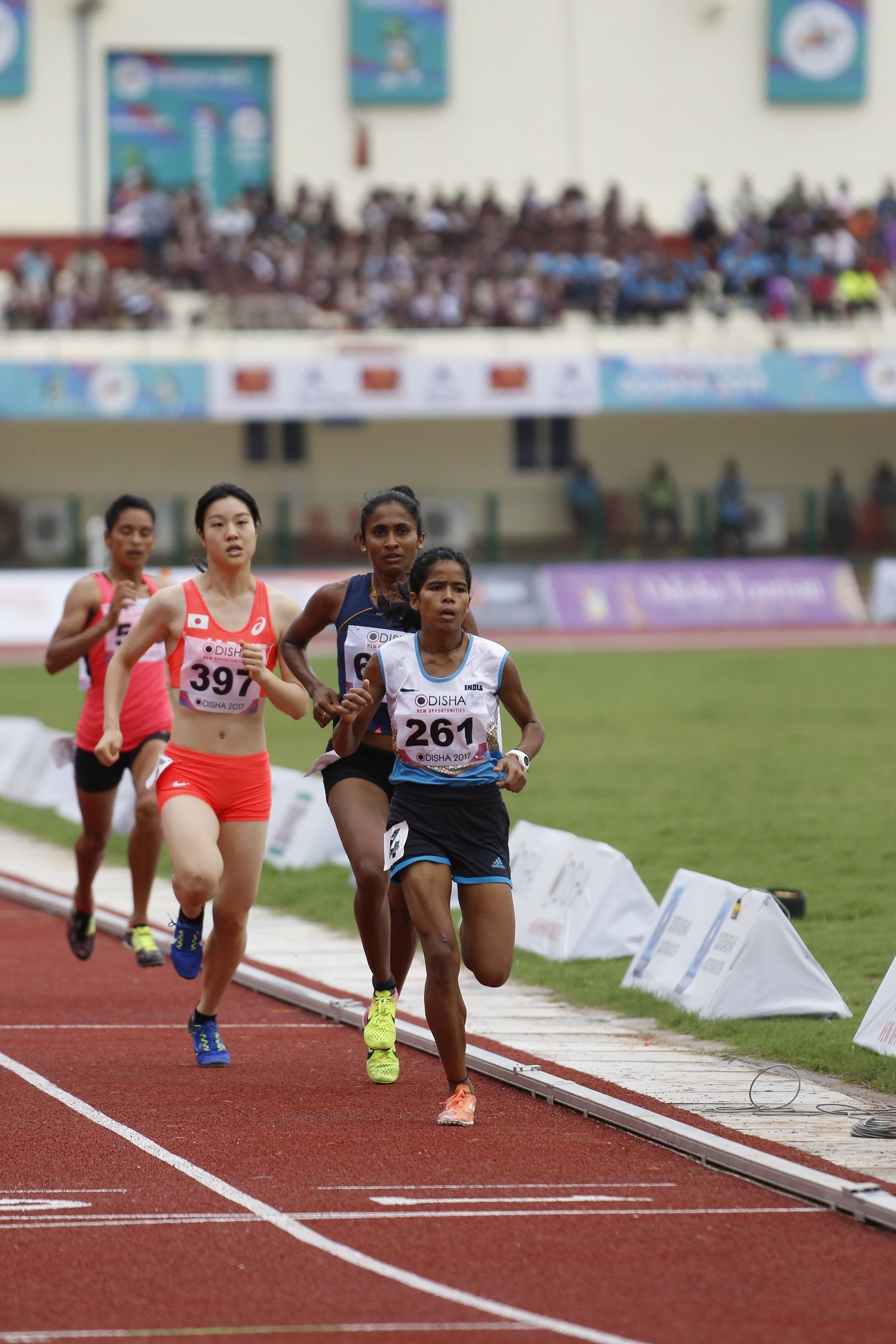
Heat 3

Qualification rule: First 2 in each heat (Q) and the next 2 fastest (q) qualified for the final.

Rank	Heat	Name	Nationality	Time	Notes
1	2	Tintu Luka	India	2:06.66	Q
2	2	Nimali Liyanarachchi	Sri Lanka	2:06.93	Q
3	3	Gayanthika Abeyrathne	Sri Lanka	2:06.95	Q
4	2	Fumika Omori	Japan	2:07.13	q
5	3	Lili Das	India	2:07.24	Q
6	3	Airi Ikezaki	Japan	2:08.32	q
7	1	Archana Adhav	India	2:09.42	Q
8	1	Tatyana Neroznak	Kazakhstan	2:09.91	Q
9	1	Shin So-mang	South Korea	2:09.94	
10	1	Song Tingting	China	2:13.16	
11	3	Saraswati Bhattarai	Nepal	2:13.99	
12	2	Arina Kleshchukova	Kyrgyzstan	2:14.97	
13	1	Gulshanoi Satarova	Kyrgyzstan	2:15.06	
14	1	Kuk Hyang	North Korea	2:15.78	
15	2	Hyo Sim	North Korea	2:20.60	
16	2	Sumi Akter	Bangladesh	2:26.48	
17	3	Marquita dos Santos	Timor-Leste	2:30.69	
	3	Goma Pradhan	Bhutan	DQ	

=== Final ===
Rank	Name	Nationality	Time	Notes
1st place, gold medalist(s)	Nimali Liyanarachchi	Sri Lanka	2:05.23	
2nd place, silver medalist(s)	Gayanthika Abeyrathne	Sri Lanka	2:05.27	
3rd place, bronze medalist(s)	Fumika Omori	Japan	2:06.50	
4	Lili Das	India	2:07.49	
5	Airi Ikezaki	Japan	2:08.62	
6	Tatyana Neroznak	Kazakhstan	2:10.10	
	Tintu Luka	India	DNF	
	Archana Adhav	India	DQ	

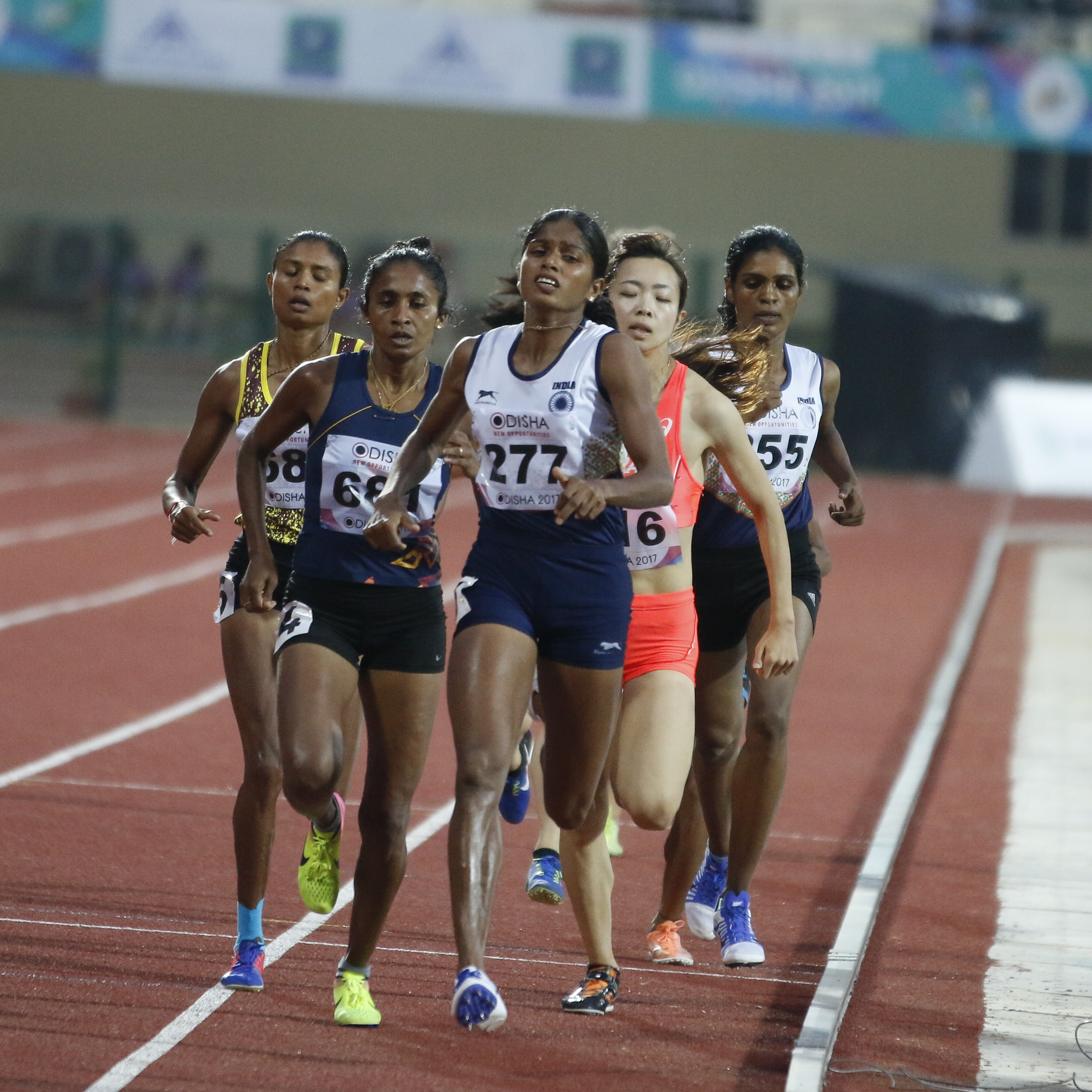
The final underway
