= Athletics at the 2014 Asian Games – Women's 800 metres =

Women's 800 metres at the 2014 Asian Games
- Venue: Incheon Asiad Main Stadium
- Dates: 30 September – 1 October 2014
- Competitors: 16 from 12 nations

Medalists
gold medal	Margarita Mukasheva	Kazakhstan
silver medal	Tintu Luka	India
bronze medal	Zhao Jing	China

The women's 800 metres event at the 2014 Asian Games was held at the Incheon Asiad Main Stadium, Incheon, South Korea on 30 September – 1 October.

== Schedule ==
All times are Korea Standard Time (UTC+09:00)

Date	Time	Event
Tuesday, 30 September 2014	20:15	Round 1
Wednesday, 1 October 2014	19:10	Final

== Records ==
Prior to this competition, the existing world, Asian and Games records were as follows.

World Record	Jarmila Kratochvílová (TCH)	1:53.28	Munich, West Germany	26 July 1983
Asian Record	Liu Dong (CHN)	1:55.54	Beijing, China	9 September 1993
Games Record	Qu Yunxia (CHN)	1:59.85	Hiroshima, Japan	12 October 1994

== Results ==
Legend

- DSQ — Disqualified

=== Round 1 ===
- Qualification: First 3 in each heat (Q) and the next 2 fastest (q) advance to the final.

==== Heat 1 ====
Rank	Athlete	Time	Notes
1	Tintu Luka (IND)	2:04.28	Q
2	Gayanthika Abeyratne (SRI)	2:04.41	Q
3	Wang Mei (CHN)	2:04.49	Q
4	Rajaa Lemmadi (BRN)	2:07.22	q
5	Park Young-sun (KOR)	2:10.48	
6	Gulshanoi Satarova (KGZ)	2:12.25	
7	Iao Si Teng (MAC)	2:20.77	
—	Sandra Jalayta (PLE)	DSQ	

==== Heat 2 ====
Rank	Athlete	Time	Notes
1	Margarita Mukasheva (KAZ)	2:02.83	Q
2	Zhao Jing (CHN)	2:02.98	Q
3	Sushma Devi (IND)	2:03.54	Q
4	Genzeb Shumi (BRN)	2:04.35	q
5	Đỗ Thị Thảo (VIE)	2:08.66	
6	Kseniia Faiskanova (KGZ)	2:11.62	
7	Chuluunkhüügiin Shinetsetseg (MGL)	2:18.67	
8	Hanin Thabit (YEM)	2:50.20	

=== Final ===
Rank	Athlete	Time	Notes
1st place, gold medalist(s)	Margarita Mukasheva (KAZ)	1:59.02	GR
2nd place, silver medalist(s)	Tintu Luka (IND)	1:59.19	
3rd place, bronze medalist(s)	Zhao Jing (CHN)	1:59.48	
4	Sushma Devi (IND)	2:01.92	
5	Genzeb Shumi (BRN)	2:03.83	
6	Wang Mei (CHN)	2:05.80	
7	Gayanthika Abeyratne (SRI)	2:06.21	
8	Rajaa Lemmadi (BRN)	2:08.75	
