= 2015 Asian Athletics Championships – Women's 800 metres =

The Women's 800 metres at the 2015 Asian Athletics Championships was held on the 6 and 7 of June.

== Medalists ==
Gold	Tintu Luka; India
Silver	Zhao Jing; China
Bronze	Nimali Liyanarachchi; Sri Lanka

== Records ==
2015 Asian Athletics Championships
World record	Jarmila Kratochvílová (TCH)	1:53.28	Munich, West Germany	26 July 1983
Asian record	Liu Dong (CHN)	1:55.54	Beijing, China	9 September 1993
Championship record	Zhang Jian (CHN)	2:01.16	Fukuoka, Japan	21 July 1998

== Schedule ==
Date	Time	Round
6 June 2015	10:10	Heats
7 June 2015	15:00	Final

== Results ==
=== Heat ===
Qualification rule: The first three finishers in each heat (Q) plus the two fastest times of those who finished fourth or lower in their heat

(q) qualified to final.

Rank	Heat	Name	Nationality	Result	Notes
1	1	Tintu Luka	India	2:06.33	Q
2	1	Gayanthika Aberathna	Sri Lanka	2:06.51	Q
3	1	Fumika Omori	Japan	2:07.44	Q
4	1	Kseniya Faiskanova	Kyrgyzstan	2:09.39	q
5	1	Wang Mei	China	2:10.51	q
6	2	Nimali Liyanarachchi	Sri Lanka	2:10.71	Q
7	2	Zhao Jing	China	2:10.77	Q
8	2	Mrimuth Gomathy	India	2:11.14	Q
9	2	Gulshanoi Satarova	Kyrgyzstan	2:13.49	
10	2	Chua Yan Ching	Hong Kong	2:22.60	
11	2	Iao Si Teng	Macau	2:25.60	
12	2	Mariquita Santos	Timor-Leste	2:26.71	
13	1	Woroud Sawalha	Palestine	2:43.81	

=== Final ===
Rank	Name	Nationality	Time	Notes
1st place, gold medalist(s)	Tintu Luka	India	2:01.53	
2nd place, silver medalist(s)	Zhao Jing	China	2:03.40	
3rd place, bronze medalist(s)	Nimali Liyanarachchi	Sri Lanka	2:03.94	
4	Mrimuth Gomathy	India	2:04.89	
5	Wang Mei	China	2:06.79	
6	Gayanthika Aberathna	Sri Lanka	2:07.46	
7	Fumika Omori	Japan	2:09.99	
	Kseniya Faiskanova	Kyrgyzstan	DNS	
