= 2017 Asian Athletics Championships – Women's long jump =

The women's long jump at the 2017 Asian Athletics Championships was held on July 6 in India.

== Results ==
Rank	Name	Nationality	#1	#2	#3	#4	#5	#6	Result	Notes
1st place, gold medalist(s)	Bùi Thị Thu Thảo	Vietnam	6.54	x	x	x	x	6.44	6.54	
2nd place, silver medalist(s)	Nellickal V. Neena	India	6.25	6.32	5.95	6.54	6.26	6.16	6.54	
3rd place, bronze medalist(s)	Nayana James	India	6.32	x	x	6.31	6.42	6.33	6.42	
4	Tamaka Shimizu	Japan	5.79	6.00	6.01	5.98	6.21	x	6.21	
5	Marestella Torres	Philippines	x	x	6.20	x	6.14	6.10	6.20	
6	Li Ying	China	6.19	x	6.11	6.11	x	6.00	6.19	
7	Sachiko Masumi	Japan	5.95	x	x	6.06	x	6.11	6.11	
8	Gothandapni Karthika	India	5.96	x	5.94	5.91	5.83	5.86	5.96	
9	Liou Ya-jyun	Chinese Taipei	3.77	5.86	5.87				5.87	
10	Noor Shahidatun Nadia	Malaysia	5.84	5.79	5.56				5.84	
11	Keshari Chaudhari	Nepal	x	x	5.15				5.15	
12	J. Al-Saed	Kuwait	4.71	4.66	4.80				4.80	
13	A. Al-Muzien	Kuwait	3.73	3.81	3.82				3.82	

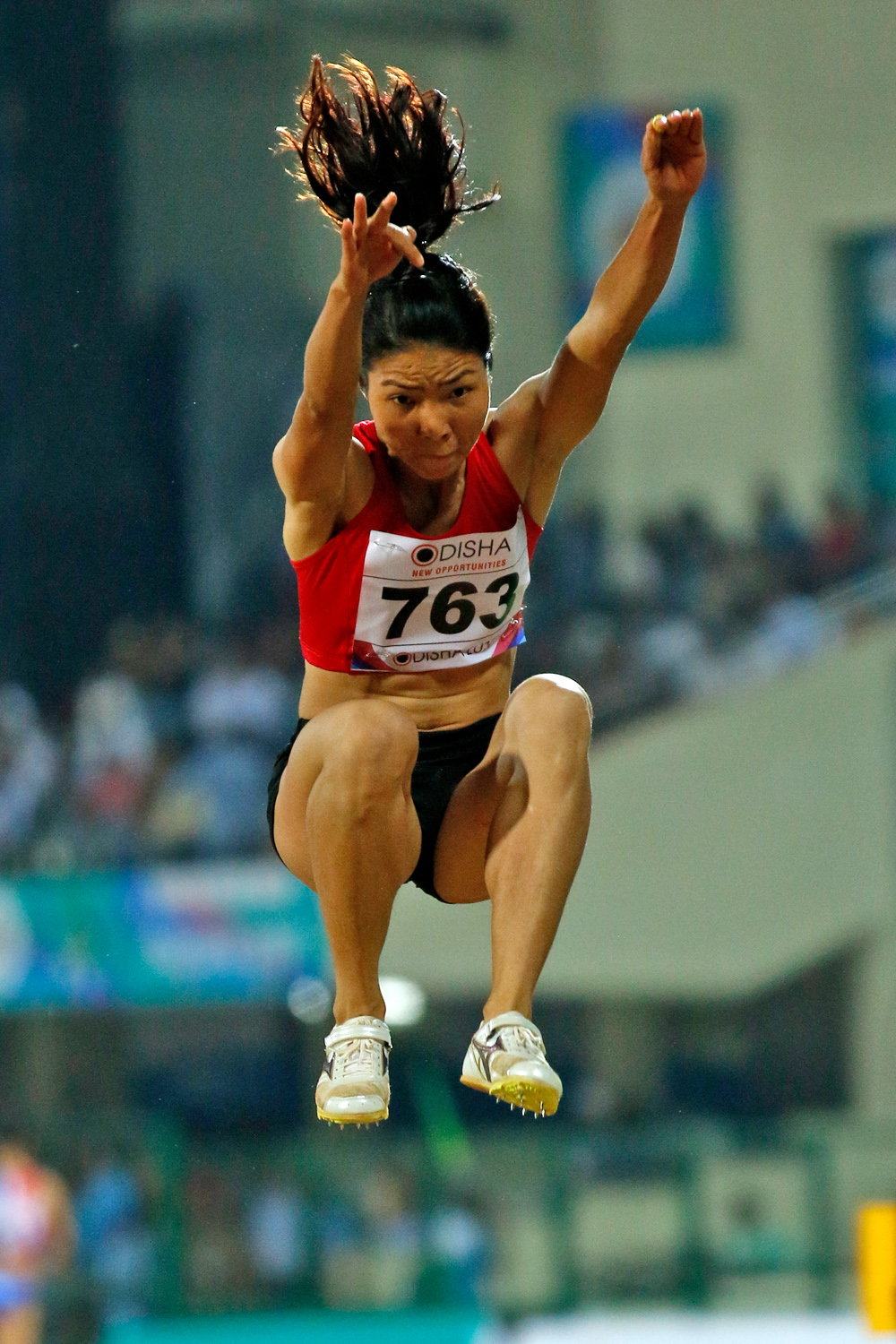
The gold medallist, Bùi Thị Thu Thảo of Vietnam
