= 2009 Asian Athletics Championships – Women's 1500 metres =

The women's 1500 metres event at the 2009 Asian Athletics Championships was held at the Guangdong Olympic Stadium on November 11.

== Results ==
Rank	Name	Nationality	Time	Notes
1st place, gold medalist(s)	Zhou Haiyan	China	4:32.74	
2nd place, silver medalist(s)	Liu Fang	China	4:33.35	
3rd place, bronze medalist(s)	Truong Thanh Hang	Vietnam	4:33.46	
4	Bindhu Simon Rajam	India	4:33.73	
5	Devi Sushma	India	4:35.04	
6	Mimi Belete	Bahrain	4:35.30	
7	Mika Yoshikawa	Japan	4:36.45	
8	Dissanayake Samanmali	Sri Lanka	4:41.05	
9	Ganthi Manthi Kumarasamy	Malaysia	4:41.35	
10	Shintsetseg Chuluunkhuu	Mongolia	4:45.89	
11	Kwak Yun Ok	North Korea	4:58.59	
	Shitaye Eshete	Bahrain	DNS	
