= 2015 Asian Athletics Championships – Women's 1500 metres =

The women's 1500 metres event at the 2015 Asian Athletics Championships was held on the 3 of June.

== Results ==
Rank	Name	Nationality	Result	Notes
~~1~~	Betlhem Desalegn	United Arab Emirates	~~4:29.39~~	DQ
1st place, gold medalist(s)	Zhao Jing	China	4:29.40	
2nd place, silver medalist(s)	Maya Iino	Japan	4:32.90	
3rd place, bronze medalist(s)	Kseniya Faiskanova	Kyrgyzstan	4:35.42	
4	Kim Chun Mi	North Korea	4:37.45	
5	Gulshanoi Satarova	Kyrgyzstan	4:38.42	
