= Gomathi Marimuthu =

Indian sprinter

Personal information
- Nationality: Indian
- Born: Gomathi Marimuthu; 8 February 1989 (age 37) Tiruchirappalli, Tamil Nadu, India

Sport
- Country: India
- Sport: Track and field
- Event: Middle-distance running
Medal record
Representing India
Gold medal – first place	2019 Doha	800 m

Gomathi Marimuthu is an Indian track and field middle-distance runner who won the gold medal in the women's 800 m at the 2019 Asian Athletics Championships held in Doha, Qatar. She was born on 8 February in the year 1989 in Tamil Nadu. She was banned for four years after failing a doping test
