= P. U. Chitra =

Indian middle-distance runner

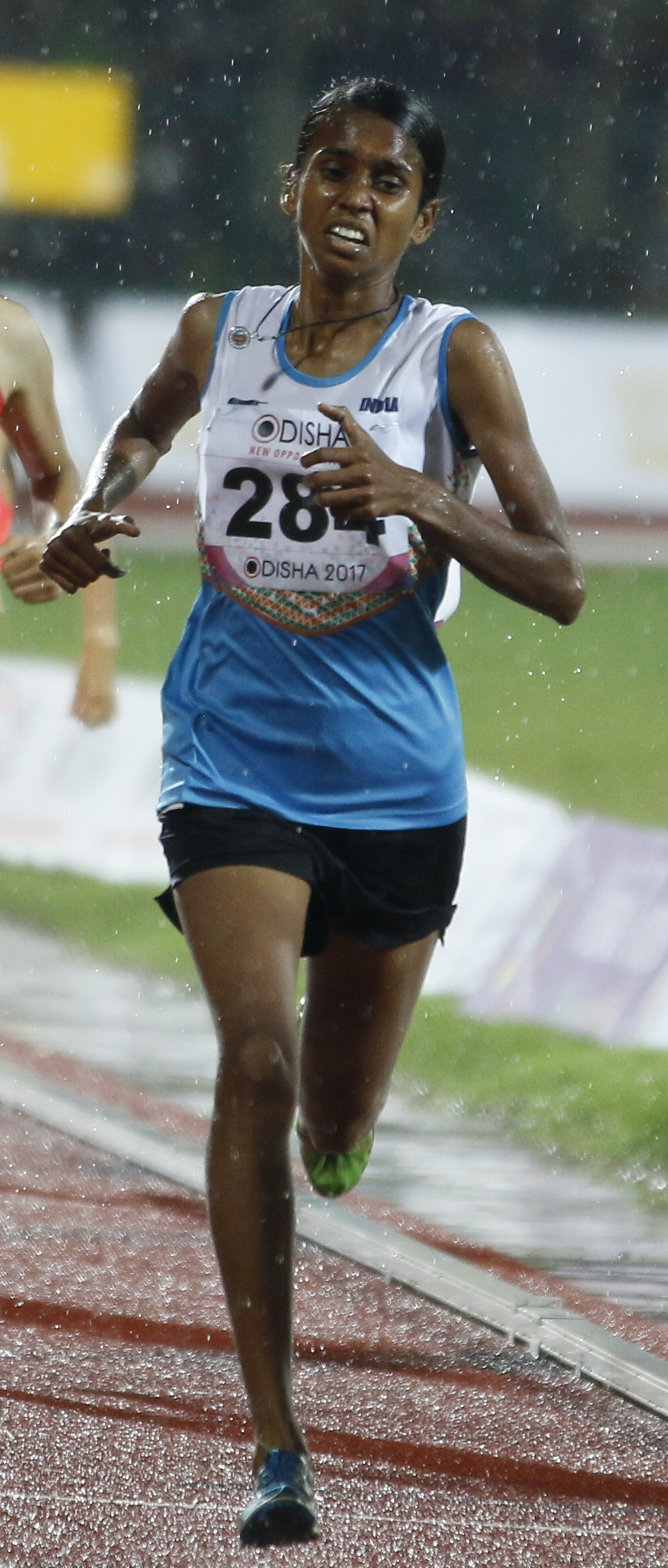
- Chitra at the 2017 Asian Championships

Personal information
- Born: Palakkeezhil Unnikrishnan Chithra; 9 June 1995 (age 31) Palakkad, Kerala, India
- Height: 160 cm (5 ft 3 in)
- Weight: 48 kg (106 lb)

Sport
- Sport: Track and field
- Event: 800–5000 m
- Coached by: Nikolai Snesarev (national); N.S. Sijin (personal)

Achievements and titles
- Personal best(s): 800 m – 2:12.21 (2013); 1500 m – 4:13.52 (2019); 3000 m – 9:51.13 (2013); 5000 m – 16:36.91 (2015)
Medal record
Women's athletics
Representing India
Asian Games
Bronze medal – third place	2018 Jakarta	1500 m
South Asian Games
Gold medal – first place	2016 Guwahati/Shillong	1500 m
Bronze medal – third place	2019 Kathmandu	1500 m
Asian Indoor and Martial Arts Games
Gold medal – first place	2017 Ashgabat	1500 m
Asian Athletics Championships
Gold medal – first place	2017 Bhubaneswar	1500 m
Gold medal – first place	2019 Doha	1500 m

Palakkeezhil Unnikrishnan Chitra (born 9 June 1995) is an Indian middle-distance runner who specialises in the 1500m distance. She won gold medals at the 2016 South Asian Games and 2017 Asian Championships and a bronze at the 2018 Asian Games. She won gold medal at the 2019 Doha Asian Athletics Championships

== Personal life and background ==
Chitra was born on 9 June 1995, at Mundur in Kerala's Palakkad District to a couple who worked as daily-wage labourers. Small monthly support of Rs. 600 [8.15 dollars approximately] and Rs. 25 per day from the Kerala Sports Council [0.34 dollars approximately] helped her continue with her training while schooling at Mundur Higher Secondary School. [] Chitra went on to win medals for India and even won two Tata Nano cars in 2013 when she has adjudged the best athlete in the National School Athletics meet in Etawah (Uttar Pradesh) and the Kerala State School Meet. []

== Career ==
Chitra made it to state-level and national-level school competitions, and she drew attention in the 2009 Kerala State School Athletics meet by winning gold in the 3,000m event and silver in 1,500m race. In the 2011 National School Games in Pune, Maharashtra, she won gold medals in the 1,500m, 3,000m, 5,000m events and a Bronze in 3 km cross country race. Chitra almost repeated the Pune performance in 2012 Kerala State School Games, Thiruvananthapuram and finished on the top of the podium in 1,500m, 3,000m and 5,000m events. In 2013, she won gold medals at the state, national and at continental levels. In the Kerala State School Games in Ernakulam, Chitra defended all her gold medals that she had won the previous year. At the National School Games in Uttar Pradesh's Etawah, She again won gold medals in the 1,500m, 3,000m, 5,000m events. She also converted the bronze she had won in 3 km cross country in 2011 to gold. At the first-ever Asian school athletic meet the same year, the Palakkad girl won the gold in the 3,000m race. In the 2016 National School Games at Ranchi in Jharkhand, her performance was a repeat of 2013 with gold medals in the 1,500m, 3,000m, 5,000m events and 3 km cross country. The same year, Chitra won her first gold medal representing the country at the senior level in 1500m at the South Asian Games.

== Controversy ==
Chitra finished at the top of the podium in 1500m race at the 2017 Asian Athletics Championship in Bhubaneshwar, only to be informed a week later that she was not to be on the Indian team for the World Athletics Championship in London. The Athletics Federation of India (AFI) said her performance was below the qualifying timing of 4:07:50. Chitra's coach approached the High Court of Kerala to get the decision reversed. The court ruled in Chitra's favour, but the International Association of Athletics Federations rejected the AFI's request to include the athlete in the Indian squad.

Chitra won the gold medal at the Asian Indoor and Martial Arts Games in September 2017 in 1500m. She followed that up with 1500m bronze medal at the 2018 Asian Games and then by defending her title at the Asian Athletics Championship in Doha. Her personal best of 4:11:10 in 1500m race came at the 2019 World Athletics Championships in Doha, while she clocked her personal best of 2:02:96 in 800m at the 2019 Inter-State Nationals in Lucknow.
