= Gulshanoi Satarova =

Kyrgyz middle-distance runner

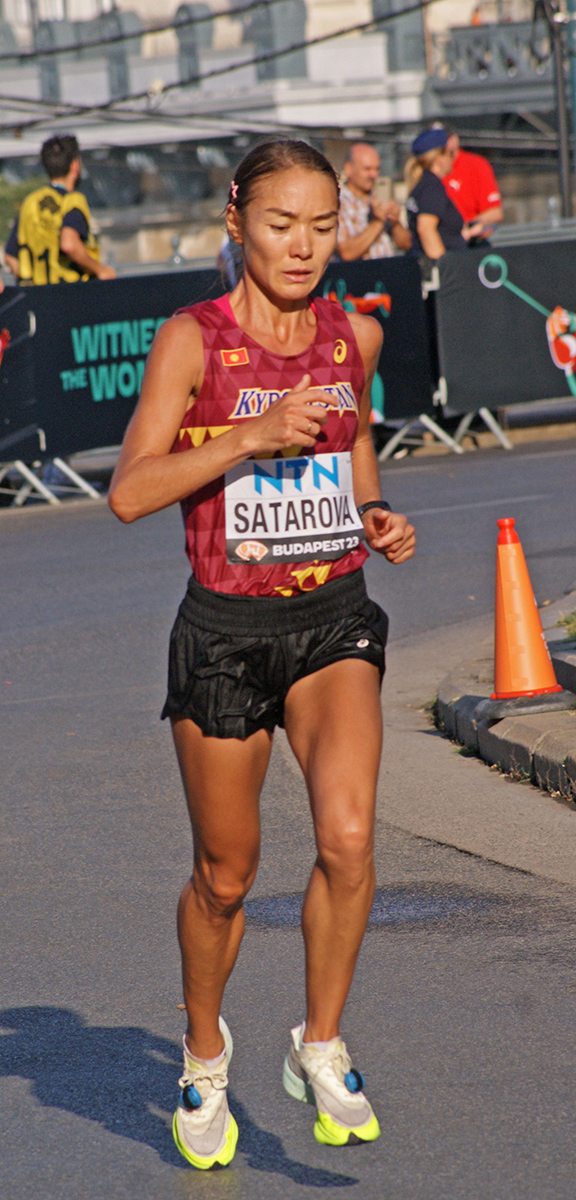

Personal information
- Born: 1 September 1992 (age 33)
- Height: 1.60 m (5 ft 3 in)
- Weight: 49 kg (108 lb)

Sport
- Sport: Athletics
- Events: 800 m, 1500 m
Medal record
Women's athletics
Representing Kyrgyzstan
Asian Indoor Championships
Silver medal – second place	2018 Tehran	3000 m

Gulshanoi Satarova (Kyrgyz: Гульшаной Сатарова; born 1 September 1992) is a Kyrgyz middle-distance runner. She won a silver medal in the 1500 metres at the 2017 Asian Indoor and Martial Arts Games.

Satarova won the Tashkent Marathon in 2022 and 2023.

== International competitions ==
Year	Competition	Venue	Position	Event	Notes
Representing Kyrgyzstan
2013	Asian Championships	Pune, India	8th	800 m	2:12.86
2013	Asian Championships	Pune, India	7th	1500 m	4:23.26
2014	Asian Indoor Championships	Hangzhou, China	5th	3000 m	9:34.77
2014	Asian Indoor Championships	Hangzhou, China	4th	4 × 400 m relay	4:12.29
2014	Asian Games	Incheon, South Korea	12th (h)	800 m	2:12.25
2014	Asian Games	Incheon, South Korea	7th	1500 m	4:24.16
2015	Asian Championships	Wuhan, China	9th (h)	800 m	2:13.49
2015	Asian Championships	Wuhan, China	5th	1500 m	4:38.42
2017	Islamic Solidarity Games	Baku, Azerbaijan	12th (h)	800 m	2:12.25
2017	Islamic Solidarity Games	Baku, Azerbaijan	9th	1500 m	4:30.07
2017	Asian Championships	Bhubaneswar, India	13th (h)	800 m	2:15.06
2017	Asian Championships	Bhubaneswar, India	8th	1500 m	4:28.57
2017	Asian Indoor and Martial Arts Games	Ashgabat, Turkmenistan	4th	800 m	2:11.58
2017	Asian Indoor and Martial Arts Games	Ashgabat, Turkmenistan	2nd	1500 m	4:31.64
2018	Asian Indoor Championships	Tehran, Iran	4th	1500 m	4:37.13
2018	Asian Indoor Championships	Tehran, Iran	2nd	3000 m	9:48.03
2018	Asian Games	Jakarta, Indonesia	12th (h)	800 m	2:11.22
2018	Asian Games	Jakarta, Indonesia	9th	1500 m	4:23.72
2022	Islamic Solidarity Games	Konya, Turkey	8th	10,000 m	36:12.22
2023	World Championships	Budapest, Hungary	28th	Marathon	2:35:06
2023	Asian Games	Hangzhou, China	11th	5000 m	16:39.93

== Personal bests ==
Outdoor

- 800 metres – 2:09.36 (Almaty 2014).
- 1500 metres – 4:22.7 (Bishkek 2015).
- 5000 metres – 16:56.1 (Bishkek 2014).

Indoor

- 800 metres – 2:11.58 (Ashgabat 2017).
- 1500 metres – 4:31.64 (Ashgabat 2017).
- 3000 metres – 9:34.77 (Hangzhou 2014).
