= Ayako Jinnouchi =

Japanese middle-distance runner

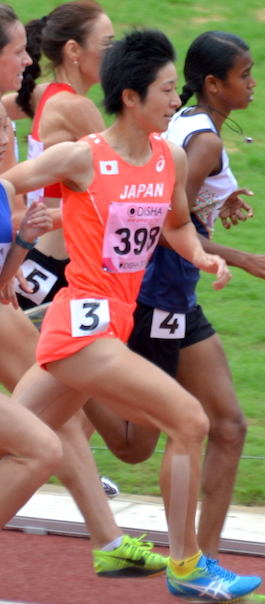
- Jinnouchi at the 2017 Asian Championships

Personal information
- Born: 21 January 1987 (age 39)
- Height: 165 cm (5 ft 5 in)
- Weight: 51 kg (112 lb)

Sport
- Sport: Athletics
- Event(s): 800 m, 1500 m

Achievements and titles
- Personal best(s): 800 m – 2:03.37 (2009); 1500 m – 4:10.08 (2013)
Medal record
Women's athletics
Representing Japan
Asian Championships
Bronze medal – third place	2007 Amman	800 m

Ayako Jinnouchi (陣内 綾子, Jinnouchi Ayako; born 21 January 1987) is a Japanese middle-distance runner. She competed in the 800 meters at the 2007 World Championships without reaching the semifinals. She won bronze medals at the Asian championships in 2005, 2007, 2013 and 2017.

== Competition record ==
Year	Competition	Venue	Position	Event	Notes
Representing Japan
2005	Asian Championships	Incheon, South Korea	3rd	800 m	2:05.69
2005	East Asian Games	Macau, China	3rd	800 m	2:05.45
2006	World Junior Championships	Beijing, China	8th (sf)	800 m	2:05.63
2007	Asian Championships	Amman, Jordan	3rd	800 m	2:08.75
2007	World Championships	Kobe, Japan	38th (h)	800 m	2:07.34
2008	Asian Indoor Championships	Doha, Qatar	4th	800 m	2:05.66
2009	Asian Championships	Guangzhou, China	4th	800 m	2:05.88
2013	Asian Championships	Pune, India	3rd	1500 m	4:16.73
2017	Asian Championships	Bhubaneswar, India	3rd	1500 m	4:19.90
2019	Asian Championships	Doha, Qatar	10th	1500 m	4:24.17
