= 2007 Asian Athletics Championships – Women's 800 metres =

The women's 800 metres event at the 2007 Asian Athletics Championships was held in Amman, Jordan on July 26.

== Results ==
Rank	Name	Nationality	Time	Notes
1st place, gold medalist(s)	Truong Thanh Hang	Vietnam	2:04.77	
2nd place, silver medalist(s)	Sinimol Paulose	India	2:06.15	
3rd place, bronze medalist(s)	Ayako Jinnouchi	Japan	2:08.75	
4	Sushma Devi	India	2:10.63	
5	Margarita Matsko	Kazakhstan	2:16.44	
6	Li Yong	China	2:18.13	
7	Bushra Parveen	Pakistan	2:23.76	
8	Kwak Yun-ok	North Korea	2:27.36	
9	Bayan Isam	Jordan	2:28.74	
10	Fathmath Hasma	Maldives	2:35.39	
11	Maryam Toesi	Iran	2:59.04	
