= Sheena Varkey =

Indian athlete

N.V. Sheena
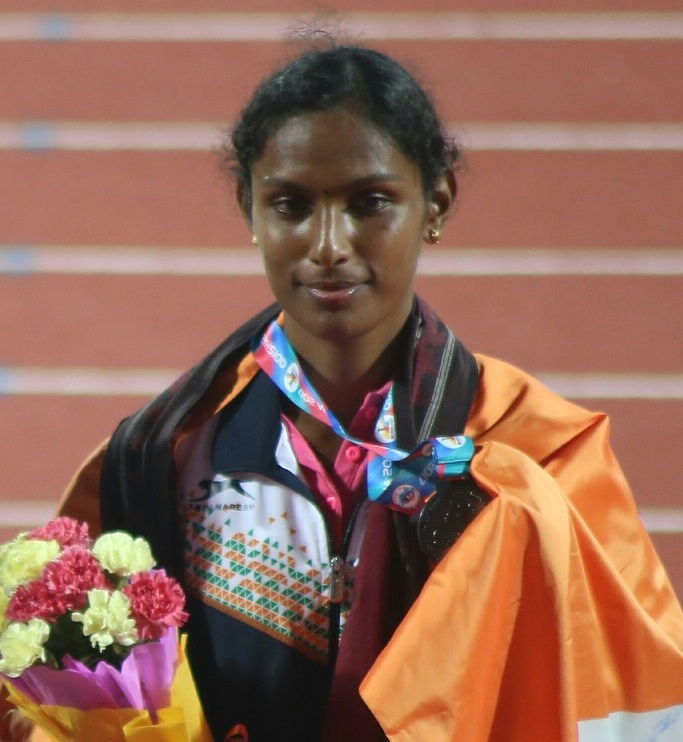
- N.V. Sheena with her bronze medal in 2017 Women Triple Jump

Personal information
- Nationality: Indian

Sport
- Country: India
- Sport: Athletics
Medal record
Women's athletics
Representing India
Asian Championships
Bronze medal – third place	2017 Bhubaneswar	Triple Jump
Asian Indoor Championships
Silver medal – second place	2018 Tehran	Triple jump

Sheena Nellickal Varkey (born 22 November 1992), or N.V. Sheena, is an Indian athlete from Kerala. She competes in triple jump event. She is named in the Indian athletics team for the women's triple jump event for the 2022 Asian Games at Hangzhou, China. She won a silver medal at the Asian Indoor Championships in 2018.

== Career ==
- 2023: In June, she won the gold at the Indian Championships, Kalinga Stadium, Bhubaneshwar, Odisha.
- 2023: In February, she took part in the 10th 2023 Asian Indoor Athletics Championships at Astana Nur-Sultan.
- 2018: In February, she won a silver medal in the women's triple jump at the 2018 Asian Indoor Athletics Championships at Tehran.
- 2017: In July, she won the bronze at the Bhubaneshwar Asian Championships, Bhubaneshwar, Odisha.
- 2016: In September, she won the gold at the Lucknow Indian Open Championships, Lucknow.
- 2014: In February, she came 7th in the 2014 Asian Indoor Athletics Championships, Hangzhou, China.
- 2012: In October, Sheena first caught the eye at the Lucknow National Junior Championships with a big win.
