= Neena Varakil =

Indian long jumper (born 1991)

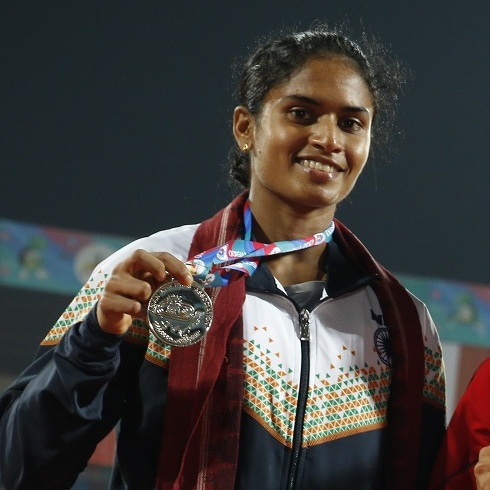
- Varakil at the 2017 Asian Championships

Personal information
- Born: 2 May 1991 (age 35) Meppayur, Kerala, India
- Height: 1.7 m (5 ft 7 in)

Sport
- Sport: Track and field
- Event: Long jump

Achievements and titles
- Personal best: 6.66 m (2016)
Medal record
Women's athletics
Representing India
Asian Games
Silver medal – second place	2018 Jakarta	Long jump
Asian Championships
Silver medal – second place	2017 Bhubaneswar	Long jump
Asian Indoor Games
Bronze medal – third place	2017 Ashgabat	Long jump
Asian Indoor Championships
Bronze medal – third place	2018 Tehran	Long jump

Neena Varakil (born 2 May 1991) is an Indian former long jumper.

== Career ==
She achieved her personal best of 6.66 m in Bangalore in July 2016. She took gold in 2017 when she jumped 6.37 m in the sixth and final round. This was at the Asian Grand Prix Athletics Meet in Jiaxing in China. She gained a silver medal at 2017 Asian Athletics Championships – Women's long jump when her compatriot, Nayana James, took bronze.

In August 2018, she took a silver medal at the long jump at the Asian Games in Jakarta. At her fourth attempt she jumped 6 m 51 cm. The gold medal was taken by Thi Thu Thao Bui of Vietnam and the bronze went to Xiaoling Xu of China. After the event she said that she was stepping back from competition to concentrate on her family. Varakil is married to Pinto Mathew, who is an international hurdler. Varakil had helped her train for the Jakarta event as she was not happy with the national coach Bedros Bedrosian.
