= 2009 Asian Athletics Championships – Women's 800 metres =

The women's 800 metres event at the 2009 Asian Athletics Championships was held at the Guangdong Olympic Stadium on November 12–13.

== Medalists ==
Gold	Silver	Bronze
Zhou Haiyan; China	Margarita Matsko; Kazakhstan	Truong Thanh Hang; Vietnam

== Results ==
=== Heats ===
Rank	Heat	Name	Nationality	Time	Notes
1	2	Liu Qing	China	2:05.62	Q
2	2	Tintu Luka	India	2:05.63	Q
3	2	Ruriko Kubo	Japan	2:05.77	Q
4	2	Viktoriya Yalovtseva	Kazakhstan	2:06.08	q
5	1	Zhou Haiyan	China	2:06.28	Q
6	1	Ayako Jinnouchi	Japan	2:06.34	Q
7	1	Margarita Matsko	Kazakhstan	2:06.40	Q
8	1	Truong Thanh Hang	Vietnam	2:06.45	q
9	1	Devi Sushma	India	2:08.63	
10	1	Champika Dilrukshi Namesheara	Sri Lanka	2:09.08	PB
11	2	Ganthi Manthi Kumarasamy	Malaysia	2:16.92	
12	1	Kwak Yun-ok	North Korea	2:19.51	
13	1	Shintsetseg Chuluunkhuu	Mongolia	2:19.84	
14	2	Leong Ka Man	Macau	2:22.26	
	2	Mimi Belete	Bahrain	DNS	

=== Final ===
Rank	Name	Nationality	Time	Notes
1st place, gold medalist(s)	Zhou Haiyan	China	2:04.89	
2nd place, silver medalist(s)	Margarita Matsko	Kazakhstan	2:05.31	
3rd place, bronze medalist(s)	Truong Thanh Hang	Vietnam	2:05.33	
4	Ayako Jinnouchi	Japan	2:05.88	
5	Liu Qing	China	2:07.36	
6	Tintu Luka	India	2:07.36	
7	Ruriko Kubo	Japan	2:08.38	
8	Viktoriya Yalovtseva	Kazakhstan	2:10.03	
