= 2017 Asian Athletics Championships – Women's 1500 metres =

The women's 1500 metres at the 2017 Asian Athletics Championships was held on 6 and 7 July.

== Medalists ==
Gold	PU Chitra; India
Silver	Geng Min; China
Bronze	Ayako Jinnouchi; Japan

== Results ==
=== Heats ===
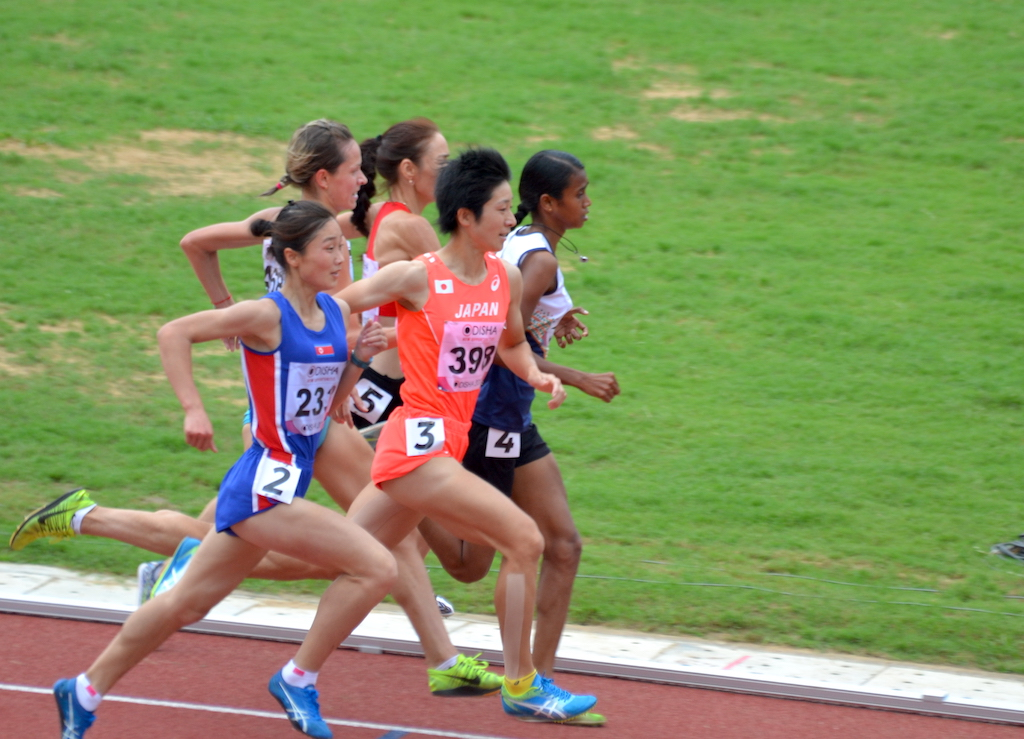
Heat 2

Qualification rule: First 5 in each heat (Q) and the next 2 fastest (q) qualified for the final.

Rank	Heat	Name	Nationality	Time	Notes
1	1	Geng Min	China	4:24.68	Q
2	1	Nozomi Tanaka	Japan	4:25.07	Q
3	1	Tamara Amer	Jordan	4:25.84	Q
4	1	Monika Choudhary	India	4:26.25	Q
5	1	Arina Kleshchukova	Kyrgyzstan	4:27.79	Q
6	1	Kuk Hyang	North Korea	4:28.78	q
7	2	Ayako Jinnouchi	Japan	4:36.74	Q
8	2	PU Chitra	India	4:36.80	Q
9	2	Hyo Sim	North Korea	4:36.81	Q
10	2	Tatyana Neroznak	Kazakhstan	4:36.83	Q
11	2	Gulshanoi Satarova	Kyrgyzstan	4:36.89	Q
12	2	Hsieh Chien-ho	Chinese Taipei	4:37.85	q
13	1	Saraswati Bhattarai	Nepal	4:41.43	
14	2	Marquita dos Santos	Timor-Leste	5:23.94	
	2	Dalila Abdulkadir	Bahrain	DNF	
	1	Sumi Akter	Bangladesh	DNS	

=== Final ===
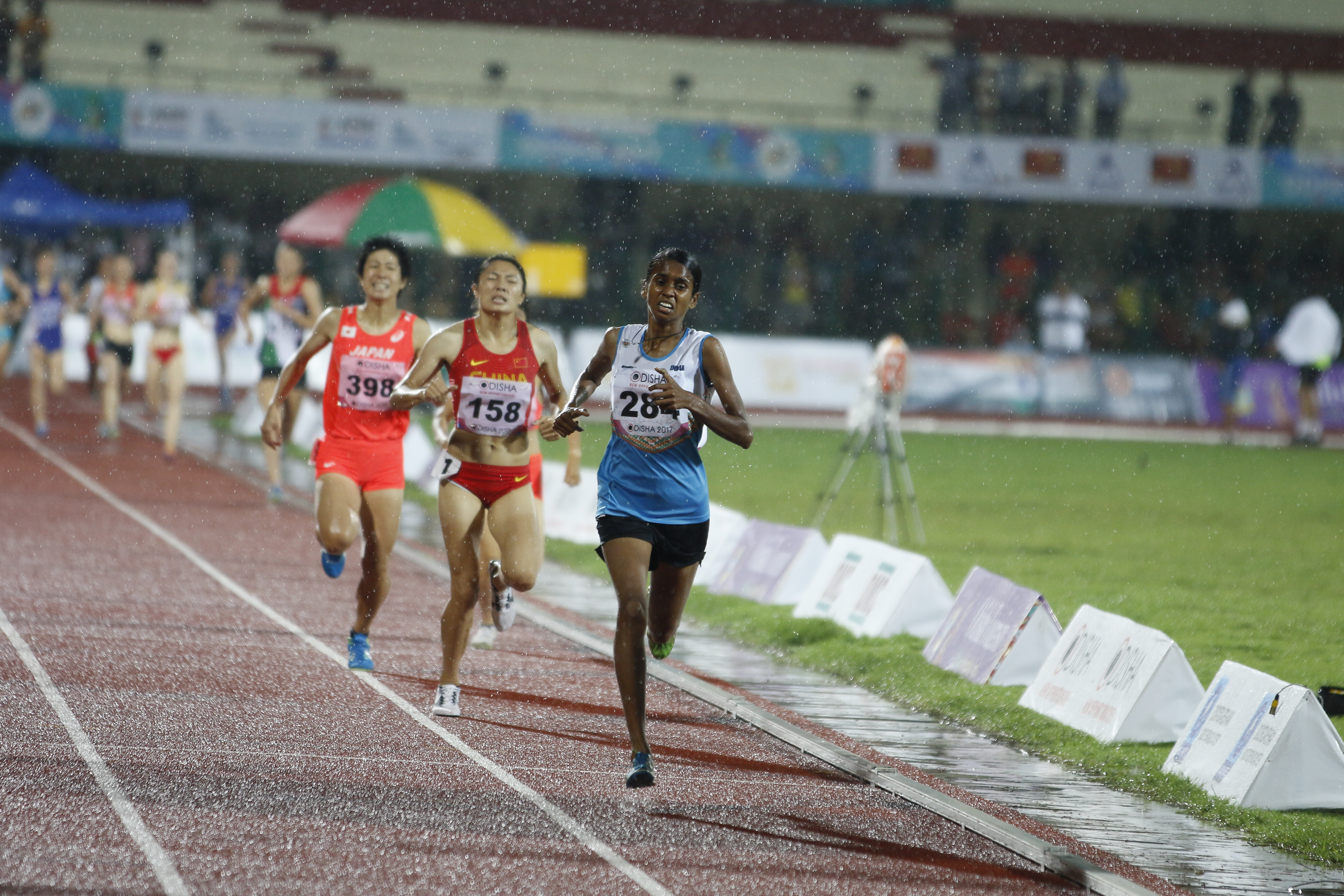
The final

Rank	Name	Nationality	Time	Notes
1st place, gold medalist(s)	PU Chitra	India	4:17.92	
2nd place, silver medalist(s)	Geng Min	China	4:19.15	
3rd place, bronze medalist(s)	Ayako Jinnouchi	Japan	4:19.90	
4	Nozomi Tanaka	Japan	4:20.43	
5	Tamara Amer	Jordan	4:25.47	
6	Tatyana Neroznak	Kazakhstan	4:26.97	
7	Arina Kleshchukova	Kyrgyzstan	4:28.26	
8	Gulshanoi Satarova	Kyrgyzstan	4:28.57	
9	Hyo Sim	North Korea	4:29.10	
10	Monika Choudhary	India	4:30.77	
11	Kuk Hyang	North Korea	4:35.86	
12	Hsieh Chien-ho	Chinese Taipei	4:46.67	
