= Akari Kishikawa =

Japanese middle-distance runner

Personal information
- Nationality: Japanese
- Born: 13 September 1985 (age 41) Yokohama, Japan
- Education: Nippon Sport Science University
- Height: 1.70 m (5 ft 7 in)
- Weight: 56 kg (123 lb)

Sport
- Country: Japan
- Sport: Track and field
- Event: 800 metres

Achievements and titles
- Personal best: 2:03.34 (Kumagaya 2011)
Medal record
Women's athletics
Representing Japan
East Asian Games
Silver medal – second place	2009 Hong Kong	800 m

Akari Kishikawa (岸川 朱里, Kishikawa Akari; born 13 September 1985 in Yokohama) is a Japanese retired middle-distance runner who specialized in the 800 metres. She was a two-time national champion in the event.

She has been the coach of the Kanto Gakuin University athletic club since 2019.

== Personal best ==
Event	Time	Competition	Venue	Date
800 m	2:03.34	Japanese Championships	Kumagaya, Japan	12 June 2011

== International competition ==
Year	Competition	Venue	Position	Event	Time
Representing Japan
2004	Asian Junior Championships	Ipoh, Malaysia	4th	800 m	2:07.89
2004	World Junior Championships	Grosseto, Italy	27th (h)	800 m	2:09.38
2009	East Asian Games	Hong Kong, China	2nd	800 m	2:07.21
2010	Asian Games	Guangzhou, China	4th	800 m	2:03.73
2011	Asian Championships	Kobe, Japan	8th	800 m	2:04.87

== National title ==
- Japanese Championships
  - 800 m: 2010, 2011
