= 2018 Asian Indoor Athletics Championships =

2018 Asian Indoor Championships
- Dates: 1–3 February
- Host city: Tehran, Iran
- Venue: Aftab Enghelab Complex
- Events: 26

The 2018 Asian Indoor Athletics Championships was the eighth edition of the international indoor athletics event between Asian nations. It took place at the Aftab Enghelab Complex in Tehran, Iran, between 1 and 3 February.

Kazakhstan topped the medal table, winning 12 medals including 7 gold, ahead of the host nation Iran, and Qatar.

== Results ==
=== Men ===
Event	Gold		Silver		Bronze	
60 metres	Hassan Taftian (IRI)	6.51 CR NR	Tosin Ogunode (QAT)	6.63	Elakkiyadasan Kanadasan (IND)	6.67 NR
400 metres	Abdalelah Haroun (QAT)	46.37	Yousef Karam (KUW)	46.66	Mohamed Nasir Abbas (QAT)	46.76
800 metres	Abubaker Haydar Abdalla (QAT)	1:51.98	Pejman Yarvali (IRI)	1:52.80	Ebrahim Al-Zofairi (KUW)	1:52.97
1500 metres	Amir Moradi (IRI)	3:53.78	Yaser Salem Bagharab (QAT)	3:53.92	Ali Fahimi (IRI)	3:54.00
3000 metres	Hossein Keyhani (IRI)	8:37.68	Yaser Salem Bagharab (QAT)	8:38.02	Homayoun Hemmati (IRI)	8:38.97
60 metres hurdles	Abdulaziz Al-Mandeel (KUW)	7.71	Ceng Jianhang (CHN)	7.74	Hideki Omuro (JPN)	7.81
4 × 400 m relay	Qatar; Abderrahaman Samba; Mohamed Nasir Abbas; Mohamed El Nour; Abdalelah Haroun	3:10.08	Kazakhstan; Andrey Sokolov; Sergey Zaykov; Dmitriy Koblov; Mikhail Litvin	3:11.68 NR	Iran; Ali Khadivar; Reza Kashef; Mehdi Rahimi; Sajjad Hashemi	3:11.74 NR
High jump	Mutaz Essa Barshim (QAT)	2.38	Keivan Ghanbarzadeh (IRI)	2.15	Mahamat Alamine Hamdi (QAT)	2.15
Pole vault	Nikita Filippov (KAZ)	5.20	Mohammad Baniadam (IRI)	5.20	Ali Al-Sabaghah (KUW)	5.00
Long jump	Shi Yuhao (CHN)	8.16	Lin Hung-min (TPE)	7.72	Janaka Wimalasiri (SRI)	7.67
Triple jump	Khaled Saeed Al-Subaie (KUW)	16.26	Kamalraj Kanagaraj (IND)	16.23	Vahid Seddigh (IRI)	15.96
Shot put	Ali Samari (IRI)	19.42	Toor Taijinder Pal Singh (IND)	19.18	Wu Jiaxing (CHN)	18.81
Heptathlon	Majed Alzaid (KUW)	5228	Milad Miri (IRI)	4842	Ali Mohebbi (IRI)	4728

=== Women ===
Event	Gold		Silver		Bronze	
60 metres	Liang Xiaojing (CHN)	7.20 CR	Viktoriya Zyabkina (KAZ)	7.39	Farzaneh Fasihi (IRI)	7.44
400 metres	Svetlana Golendova (KAZ)	53.28	Elina Mikhina (KAZ)	53.49	Upamalika Walawwe (SRI)	54.90
800 metres	Wang Chunyu (CHN)	2:09.30	Hu Zhiying (CHN)	2:10.81	Nimali Liyanarachchi (SRI)	2:10.83
1500 metres	Gayanthika Abeyratne (SRI)	4:26.83	Tatyana Neroznak (KAZ)	4:28.20	Nguyễn Thị Oanh (VIE)	4:28.87
3000 metres	Tatyana Neroznak (KAZ)	9:33.65	Gulshanoi Satarova (KGZ)	9:48.03	Nguyễn Thị Oanh (VIE)	9:48.48
60 metres hurdles	Aigerim Shynazbekova (KAZ)	8.32	Elnaz Kompani (IRI)	8.46 NR	Sara Naddafi (IRI)	8.87
4 × 400 m relay	Kazakhstan; Svetlana Golendova; Adelina Akhmetova; Viktoriya Zyabkina; Elina Mikhina	3:41.67	Iran; Maryam Mohebbi; Faezeh Nesaei; Elham Kakoli; Zahra Moradi	3:51.39 NR	Turkmenistan ? ? ? Maria Rozymova	3:58.81
High jump	Nadiya Dusanova (UZB)	1.87	Sepideh Tavakkoli (IRI)	1.80	Nadezhda Dubovitskaya (KAZ)	1.80
Pole vault	Anastasiya Yermakova (KAZ)	3.70	Mahsa Mirzatabibi (IRI)	3.50	Sara Karimi (IRI); Niloufar Fashkhorani (IRI)	2.40
Long jump	Bùi Thị Thu Thảo (VIE)	6.20	Nayana James (IND)	6.08	Neena Varakil (IND)	6.06
Triple jump	Irina Ektova (KAZ)	13.79	Sheena Varkey (IND)	13.37	Bùi Thị Thu Thảo (VIE)	13.22
Shot put	Elena Smolyanova (UZB)	15.54	Maryam Norouzi (IRI)	12.47	Sana Dadres (IRI)	11.46
Pentathlon	Sepideh Tavakkoli (IRI)	4038 NR	Aleksandra Yurkevskaya (UZB)	3858	Irina Velihanova (TKM)	3730

== Medal table ==
* Host nation (Host nation)

Rank	Nation	Gold	Silver	Bronze	Total
1	Kazakhstan	7	4	1	12
2	Iran*	5	9	10	24
3	Qatar	4	3	2	9
4	China	3	2	1	6
5	Kuwait	3	1	2	6
6	Uzbekistan	2	1	0	3
7	Sri Lanka	1	0	3	4
7	Vietnam	1	0	3	4
9	India	0	4	2	6
10	Chinese Taipei	0	1	0	1
10	Kyrgyzstan	0	1	0	1
12	Turkmenistan	0	0	2	2
13	Japan	0	0	1	1
Totals (13 entries)		26	26	27	79

== Participating nations ==
- Afghanistan (2)
- Bangladesh (5)
- China (12)
- Chinese Taipei (2)
- Hong Kong (7)
- India (13)
- Iran (67)
- Iraq (-)
- Japan (6)
- Kazakhstan (25)
- Kuwait (19)
- Kyrgyzstan (5)
- Lebanon (6)
- Macau (5)
- Malaysia (2)
- Oman (5)
- Pakistan (6)
- Qatar (12)
- Sri Lanka (5)
- Turkmenistan (5)
- Uzbekistan (10)
- Vietnam (3)
