= 2019 Asian Athletics Championships – Women's 1500 metres =

Women's 1500 metres at the 2019 Asian Athletics Championships
- Venue: Khalifa International Stadium
- Location: Doha, Qatar
- Dates: 24 April
- Competitors: 18 from 13 nations
- Winning time: 4:14.56

Medalists
gold medal	P. U. Chitra	India
silver medal	Tigist Gashaw	Bahrain
bronze medal	Winfred Mutile Yavi	Bahrain

The women's 1500 metres at the 2019 Asian Athletics Championships was held on 24 April.

== Records ==
Records before the 2019 Asian Athletics Championships
Record	Athlete (nation)	Time (s)	Location	Date
World record	Genzebe Dibaba (ETH)	3:50.07	Fontvieille, Monaco	17 July 2015
Asian record	Qu Yunxia (CHN)	3:50.46	Beijing, China	11 September 1993
Championship record	Miho Sugimori (JPN)	4:12.69	Incheon, South Korea	1 September 2005
World leading	Genzebe Dibaba (ETH)	3:59.08	Sabadell, Spain	6 February 2019
Asian leading	No times recorded			

== Results ==
Rank	Name	Nationality	Time	Notes
1st place, gold medalist(s)	P. U. Chitra	India	4:14.56	
2nd place, silver medalist(s)	Tigist Gashaw	Bahrain	4:14.81	
3rd place, bronze medalist(s)	Winfred Mutile Yavi	Bahrain	4:16.18	SB
4	Ran Urabe	Japan	4:17.90	
5	Nguyễn Thị Oánh	Vietnam	4:19.64	SB
6	Zheng Xiaoqian	China	4:21.03	SB
7	Tatyana Neroznak	Kazakhstan	4:21.48	PB
8	Gulshan Satarova	Kyrgyzstan	4:22.31	PB
9	Zhong Xiaoqian	China	4:22.61	SB
10	Ayako Jinnouchi	Japan	4:24.17	
11	Gayanthika Abeyratne	Sri Lanka	4:24.42	
12	Angela Freitas De Fatima Araujo	Timor-Leste	4:29.96	NR
13	Khuất Phương Anh	Vietnam	4:30.89	SB
14	Lili Das	India	4:32.41	
15	Toktam Dastarbandan	Iran	4:37.81	PB
16	Thet Phyu War	Myanmar	4:42.91	SB
17	Goh Chui Ling	Singapore	4:48.22	
18	Huriah Al-Ward	Yemen	5:38.72	SB
