= Ruriko Kubo =

Japanese middle-distance runner

Personal information
- Nationality: Japanese
- Born: 23 January 1989 (age 37) Hiroshima Prefecture, Japan
- Education: Fukushima University
- Height: 1.71 m (5 ft 7 in)
- Weight: 53 kg (117 lb)

Sport
- Country: Japan
- Sport: Track and field
- Event: 800 metres

Achievements and titles
- Personal best: 2:01.90 (Ninove 2011)

Ruriko Kubo (久保 瑠里子, Kubo Ruriko; born 23 January 1989) is a Japanese middle-distance runner who specialises in the 800 metres. She was the 2012 Japanese Championships champion in the event.

== Personal best ==
Event	Time	Competition	Venue	Date
800 m	2:01.90	Memorial Geert Rasschaert	Ninove, Belgium	6 August 2011

== International competition ==
Year	Competition	Venue	Position	Event	Time
Representing Japan
2005	World Youth Championships	Marrakesh, Morocco	15th (sf)	400 m	57.11
2005	World Youth Championships	Marrakesh, Morocco	6th	Medley relay	2:10.66 (relay leg: 4th)
2006	World Junior Championships	Beijing, China	19th (sf)	800 m	2:11.47
2008	World Junior Championships	Bydgoszcz, Poland	25th (h)	800 m	2:09.70
2009	Asian Championships	Guangzhou, China	7th	800 m	2:08.38
2010	Asian Games	Guangzhou, China	5th	800 m	2:04.52
2011	Asian Championships	Kobe, Japan	4th	800 m	2:03.34

== National title ==
- Japanese Championships
  - 800 m: 2012
