= Bùi Thị Thu Thảo =

Vietnamese long jumper (born 1992)

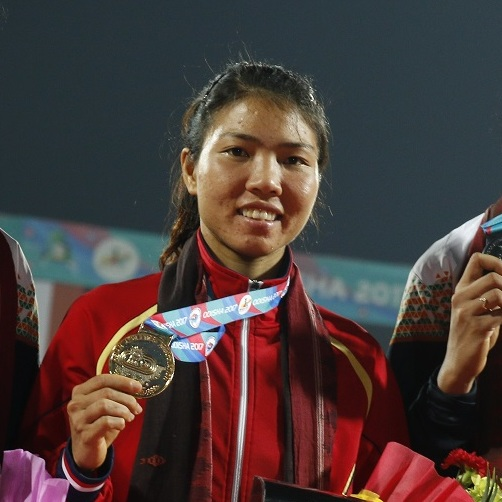
- Bùi Thị Thu Thảo in 2017

Personal information
- Nationality: Vietnam
- Born: 29 April 1992 (age 34) Hanoi, Vietnam
- Height: 1.64 m (5 ft 5 in)
- Weight: 58 kg (128 lb)

Sport
- Sport: Athletics
- Events: Long jump, Triple jump
Medal record
Women's athletics
Representing Vietnam
Asian Games
Silver medal – second place	2014 Incheon	Long jump
Gold medal – first place	2018 Jakarta-Palembang	Long jump
Asian Championships
Gold medal – first place	2017 Bhubaneswar	Long jump
Asian Indoor and Martial Arts Games
Silver medal – second place	2017 Ashgabat	Long jump
Asian Indoor Championships
Gold medal – first place	2018 Tehran	Long jump
Silver medal – second place	2016 Doha	Long jump
Bronze medal – third place	2018 Tehran	Triple jump
Asian Junior Athletics Championships
Bronze medal – third place	2010 Hanoi	Heptathlon
Asian Beach Games
Gold medal – first place	2016 Da Nang	Long jump
Silver medal – second place	2014 Phuket	Long jump
Southeast Asian Games
Gold medal – first place	2017 Kuala Lumpur	Long jump
Silver medal – second place	2015 Singapore	Long jump
Bronze medal – third place	2013 Naypyidaw	Long jump

Bùi Thị Thu Thảo (born 29 April 1992) is a Vietnamese athlete specialising in the long jump.

Her personal bests in the event are 6.68 metres outdoors (+0.2 m/s, Kuala Lumpur 2017) and 6.36 metres indoors (Ashgabat 2017).

== International competitions ==
Year	Competition	Venue	Position	Event	Notes
Representing Vietnam
2010	Asian Junior Championships	Hanoi, Vietnam	3rd	Heptathlon	4170 pts
2011	Southeast Asian Games	Palembang, Indonesia	5th	Long jump	6.11 m
2013	Southeast Asian Games	Naypyidaw, Myanmar	3rd	Long jump	6.14 m
2014	Asian Games	Incheon, South Korea	2nd	Long jump	6.44 m
2014	Asian Beach Games	Danang, Vietnam	2nd	Long jump	5.35 m
2015	Southeast Asian Games	Singapore	2nd	Long jump	6.65 m
2016	Asian Indoor Championships	Doha, Qatar	2nd	Long jump	6.30 m
2016	Asian Beach Games	Danang, Vietnam	1st	Long jump	6.32 m
2017	Asian Championships	Bhubaneswar, India	1st	Long jump	6.54 m
2017	Southeast Asian Games	Kuala Lumpur, Malaysia	1st	Long jump	6.68 m
2017	Asian Indoor and Martial Arts Games	Ashgabat, Turkmenistan	2nd	Long jump	6.36 m
2018	Asian Indoor Championships	Tehran, Iran	1st	Long jump	6.20 m
2018	Asian Indoor Championships	Tehran, Iran	3rd	Triple jump	13.22 m
2018	Asian Games	Jakarta, Indonesia	1st	Long jump	6.55 m
2023	Asian Championships	Bangkok, Thailand	8th	Long jump	6.22 m
2023	Asian Games	Hangzhou, China	8th	Long jump	6.09 m
