= Gayanthika Abeyratne =

Sri Lankan middle-distance runner

Gayanthika Aberathna
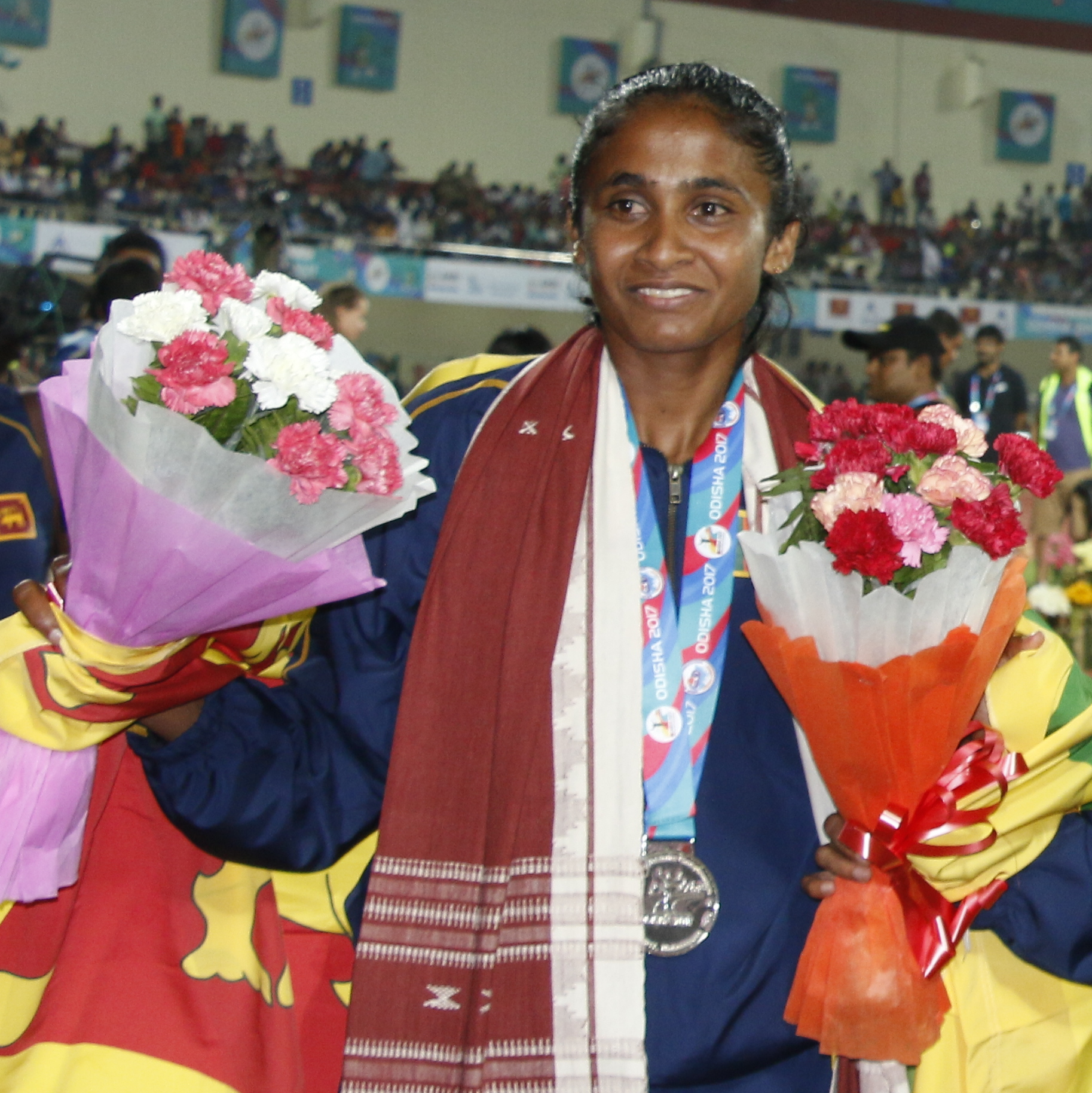

Personal information
- Born: 23 December 1986 (age 39) Sooriyawewa, Sri Lanka
- Height: 1.62 m (5 ft 4 in)
- Weight: 48 kg (106 lb)

Sport
- Sport: Athletics
- Event(s): 800 m, 1500 m
Medal record
Women's Athletics
Representing Sri Lanka
Asian Indoor Championships
Gold medal – first place	2018 Tehran	1500 m
South Asian Games
Gold medal – first place	2019 Kathmandu	4 × 400 m relay
Silver medal – second place	2019 Kathmandu	800 m
Silver medal – second place	2016 Guwahati	800 m
Silver medal – second place	2016 Guwahati	1500 m

Gayanthika Artigala Thushari Abeyratne (born 23 December 1986) is a Sri Lankan middle-distance runner who established a national record time at 800m.

== Career ==
She won a gold medal at the 2017 Asian Indoor and Martial Arts Games and silver at the 2017 Asian Championships. She currently holds her country's national record in the 800 metres.

At the 2023 Asian Athletics Championships in Bangkok she won a bronze medal in the 1500m.

== International competitions ==
Year	Competition	Venue	Position	Event	Notes
Representing Sri Lanka
2014	Asian Games	Incheon, South Korea	7th	800 m	2:06.21
2015	Asian Championships	Wuhan, China	6th	800 m	2:07.46
2015	Military World Games	Mungyeong, South Korea	13th (h)	1500 m	4:36.29
2016	South Asian Games	Guwahati, India	2nd	800 m	2:09.64
2016	South Asian Games	Guwahati, India	2nd	1500 m	4:25.75
2017	Asian Championships	Bhubaneswar, India	2nd	800 m	2:05.27
2017	Asian Indoor and Martial Arts Games	Ashgabat, Turkmenistan	1st	800 m	2:05.12
2018	Asian Indoor Championships	Tehran, Iran	4th	800 m	2:11.20
2018	Asian Indoor Championships	Tehran, Iran	1st	1500 m	4:26.83
2018	Commonwealth Games	Gold Coast, Australia	21st (h)	800 m	2:04.72
2018	Asian Games	Jakarta, Indonesia	6th	800 m	2:05.50
2019	Asian Championships	Doha, Qatar	4th	800 m	2:05.74
2019	Asian Championships	Doha, Qatar	11th	1500 m	4:24.42
2019	South Asian Games	Kathmandu, Nepal	2nd	800 m	2:08.52
2022	World Championships	Eugene, United States	29th (h)	800 m	2:02.35
2023	Asian Championships	Bangkok, Thailand	3rd	800 m	2:03.25
2023	Asian Championships	Bangkok, Thailand	3rd	1500 m	4:14.39
2023	Asian Games	Hangzhou, China	8th	800 m	2:05.87
2023	Asian Games	Hangzhou, China	4th	1500 m	4:18.77

== Personal bests ==
Outdoor

- 400 metres – 55.62 (Colombo 2014)
- 800 metres – 2:02.55 (Diyagama 2017) NR
- 1500 metres – 4:18.7 (Jaffna 2016)
- 5000 metres – 17:00.46 (Diyagama 2011)

Indoor

- 800 metres – 2:05.12 (Ashgabat 2017)
