= Margarita Mukasheva =

Kazakhstani middle-distance runner

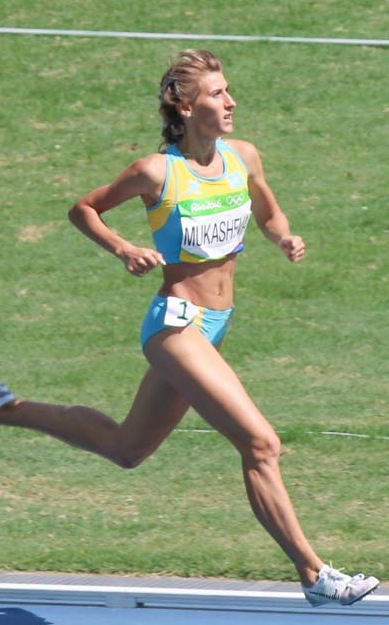
- Mukasheva at the 2016 Olympics

Personal information
- Born: Margarita Matsko; 29 April 1989 (age 37) Novopokrovka, Shal akyn District, Kazakh SSR, Soviet Union
- Education: North Kazakhstan State University
- Height: 165 cm (5 ft 5 in)
- Weight: 50 kg (110 lb)

Sport
- Sport: Athletics
- Event: 800 m
- Coached by: Vyacheslav Sokirko (national)

Achievements and titles
- Personal best: 1:58.96 (2013)
Medal record
Women's athletics
Representing Kazakhstan
Asian Championships
Bronze medal – third place	2007 Amman	4×400 m
Asian Indoor Championships
Bronze medal – third place	2008 Doha	800 m

Margarita Yevgenyevna Mukasheva (Russian: Маргарита Евгеньевна Мукашева, née Matsko on 4 January 1986) is a Kazakhstani runner who specializes in the individual 800 metres and 4 × 400 m relay.

Mukasheva took up athletics aged 16 and has had success on the regional level. At the 2007 Asian Championships she won a bronze medal in the relay. She won the bronze medal in the individual event at the 2008 Asian Indoor Championships, silver at the 2009 Asian Championships and gold at the 2009 Asian Indoor Games. She competed at the 2010 World Indoor Championships, the 2011 and 2013 World Athletics Championships and the 2012 Summer Olympics.

After winning a gold medal at the 2014 Asian Games, Mukasheva semi-retired for a year and worked as a sports administrator. She returned to compete at the 2016 Olympics. She qualified in the 800 metres event, but was eliminated in the heats.

== Competition record ==
Year	Competition	Venue	Position	Event	Notes
Representing Kazakhstan
2007	Asian Championships	Amman, Jordan	5th	800 m	2:16.44
2007	Asian Championships	Amman, Jordan	3rd	4 × 400 m relay	3:50.81
2007	Universiade	Bangkok, Thailand	18th (h)	800 m	2:12.16
2008	Asian Indoor Championships	Doha, Qatar	3rd	800 m	2:04.85
2009	Universiade	Belgrade, Serbia	7th	800 m	2:04.60
2009	Asian Indoor Games	Hanoi, Vietnam	1st	800 m	2:03.06
2009	Asian Indoor Games	Hanoi, Vietnam	1st	4 × 400 m relay	3:39.21
2009	Asian Championships	Guangzhou, China	2nd	800 m	2:05.31
2009	Asian Championships	Guangzhou, China	4th	4 × 400 m relay	3:36.54
2010	World Indoor Championships	Doha, Qatar	14th (h)	800 m	2:06.36
2010	Asian Games	Guangzhou, China	1st	800 m	2:00.29
2010	Asian Games	Guangzhou, China	2nd	4 × 400 m relay	3:30.03
2011	Asian Championships	Kobe, Japan	2nd	800 m	2:02.46
2011	Universiade	Shenzhen, China	20th (h)	800 m	2:06.62
2011	World Championships	Daegu, South Korea	31st (h)	800 m	2:04.24
2012	Olympic Games	London, United Kingdom	8th (sf)	800 m	1:59.20
2013	Universiade	Kazan, Russia	1st	800 m	1:58.96
2013	World Championships	Moscow, Russia	26th (h)	800 m	2:02.06
2014	Asian Games	Incheon, South Korea	1st	800 m	1:59.02
2014	Asian Games	Incheon, South Korea	6th	4 × 400 m relay	3:36.83
2016	Olympic Games	Rio de Janeiro, Brazil	31st (h)	800 m	2:00.97
2018	Asian Games	Jakarta, Indonesia	2nd	800 m	2:02.40
2018	Asian Games	Jakarta, Indonesia	6th	4 × 400 m relay	3:36.73
2019	Asian Championships	Doha, Qatar	3rd	800 m	2:03.83
