= Wang Chunyu =

Chinese middle-distance runner

Medal record

Women's athletics

Representing China

Asian Championships
Gold medal – first place	2013 Pune	800 m

Asian Indoor Championships
Gold medal – first place	2018 Tehran	800 m

World Youth Championships
Silver medal – second place	2011 Lille	800 m

Wang Chunyu (Chinese: 王春雨; born 17 January 1995) is a Chinese track and field athlete who specialises in the 800 metres. She has a personal best of 1:57.00 minutes. She was the gold medallist at the Asian Athletics Championships in 2013 and the runner-up at the 2011 World Youth Championships.

Born in Suzhou in China's Anhui province, Wang had her first successes at provincial level winning a series of events in 2010. She began entering national competitions in 2011 at the age of sixteen and became the youngest ever winner on the national indoor circuit with a victory in Nanjing in February.

She entered the 800 m at the 2011 World Youth Championships in Athletics and improved through the rounds, reducing her best from 2:07.13 to 2:03.23 by the end of the competition. In the final she nipped Jessica Judd at the line to take the silver medal behind the favourite Ajeé Wilson. The sixteen-year-old Wang set a personal best of 2:01.34 minutes to win at the China City Games junior competition – this was the fastest run by a Chinese athlete in over five years and the best by a Chinese youth since Ma Junren-trained Lin Na ran at the 1997 Chinese Games.

Chunyu competed exclusively on the national circuit in 2012 and her best run of the season came at the Chinese Athletics Championships, where she was just two hundredths of a second behind Zhao Jing, with a time of 2:01.48 minutes. At the start of the 2013 outdoor season she placed sixth in the 800 m at the IAAF Diamond League meeting in Shanghai then went on to win her first major title in the form of the 800 m gold medal at the 2013 Asian Athletics Championships. She beat Bahrain's Ethiopian-born Genzeb Shumi by a margin of almost two seconds.

On 31 July 2021, she qualified for the final of women's 800 metres at 2020 Summer Olympics in Tokyo with her personal best of 1:59.14, thus becoming the first Chinese athlete to ever have reached the Olympic final of this competition. She finished 5th in the final with 1:57.00, her personal best.
