= Nayana James =

Indian long jumper

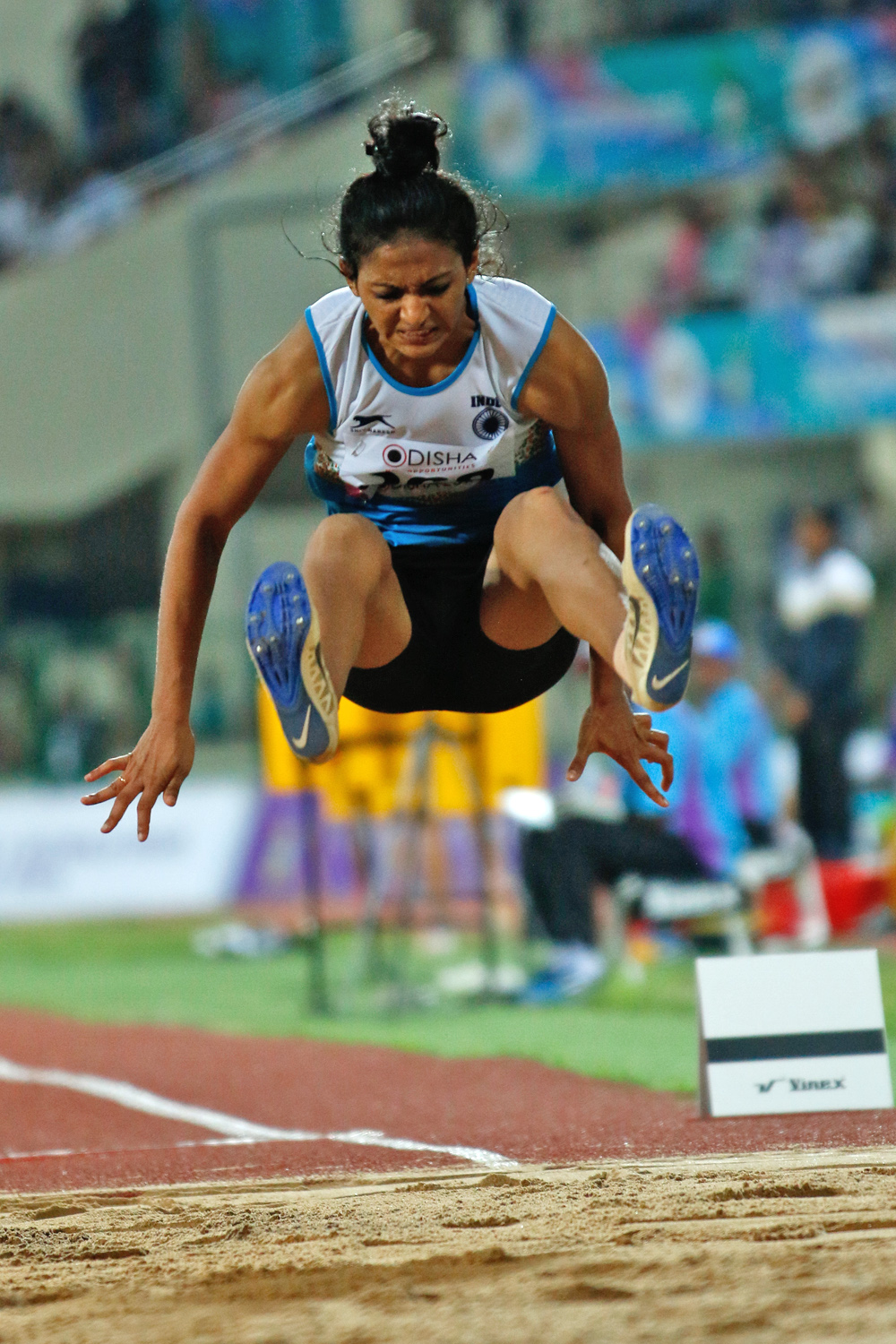

Personal information
- Nationality: Indian
- Born: 18 October 1995 (age 30) Perambra Kozhikode, Kerala, India
- Education: MAR IVANIOS COLLEGE - University of Kerala
- Height: 1.74 m (5 ft 9 in)
- Weight: 62 kg (137 lb)

Sport
- Country: India
- Sport: Track and field
- Event: Long jump

Achievements and titles
- Personal best: 6.67 (Bangalore 2024)
Medal record
Women's athletics
Representing India
Asian Championships
Bronze medal – third place	2017 Bhubaneswar	Long jump
Asian Indoor Championships
Silver medal – second place	2018 Tehran	Long jump

Nayana James (born 18 October 1995) is an Indian athlete competing in the long jump event.

She gained a bronze medal at 2017 Asian Athletics Championships – Women's long jump while her compatriot, Neena Varakil, took silver.

== Early life ==
Nayana was born on 18 October 1995 in Kozhikode, a district in Kerala state, India. She was discovered by KM Peter, a former athlete, while she was a student at St. George's Higher Secondary School in Kozhikode. In 2010, Nayana shifted to the institute of the Sports Authority of India in Thalassery, Kerala to train under Jose Mathew, former coach of the renowned athlete Mayookha Johny. She married Kevin in 2016.

== Career ==
Nayana shot to fame after her gold-winning performance at the 21st Federation Cup National Senior Athletics Championships at Patiala in 2017. James recorded a 6.55m jump in the long jump event, her personal best. At the 22nd Federation Cup in Patiala, Nayana continued her streak by winning another gold in the long jump event.

Nayana's 6.55m jump is among the top-5 Indian performances in long jump event history. In 2018, she secured the 12th place in the Commonwealth Games women's long jump event. At the 2018 Asian Indoors Games, Nayana bagged the silver medal with a leap of 6.08m in women's long jump.

In June 2024, she defeated Asian No. 1 Sumire Hata of Japan and won the gold medal at the Taiwan Open despite the adverse rainy conditions.
