= Tintu Luka =

Indian middle-distance runner

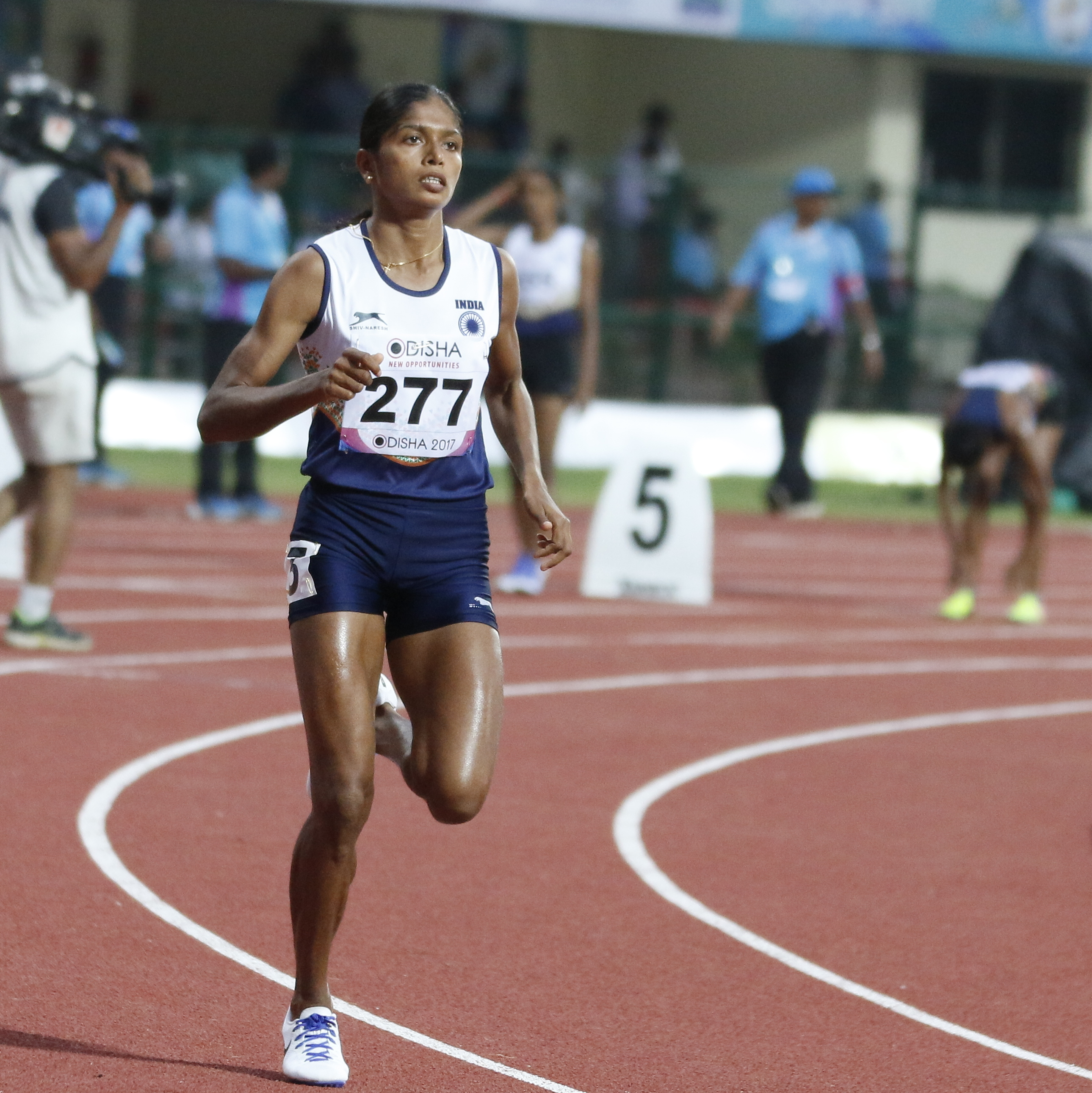

Personal information
- Nationality: Indian
- Born: 26 April 1989 (age 37) Karikkottakary, Iritty, Kerala, India

Sport
- Country: India
- Sport: Running
- Event: 800 metres
Medal record
Women's athletics
Representing India
Asian Games
Gold medal – first place	2014 Incheon	4 x 400 m relay
Silver medal – second place	2014 Incheon	800 m
Bronze medal – third place	2010 Guangzhou	800 m
Asian Championships
Gold medal – first place	2013 Pune	4x400 m relay
Gold medal – first place	2015 Wuhan	800 m
Silver medal – second place	2011 Kobe	4x400 m relay
Silver medal – second place	2015 Wuhan	4x400 m relay
Bronze medal – third place	2011 Kobe	800 m
Bronze medal – third place	2013 Pune	800 m
Asian Junior Athletics Championships
Silver medal – second place	2008 Jakarta	800m
Bronze medal – third place	2008 Jakarta	4×400m relay
National Games
Gold medal – first place	2015 Kerala	800m
Gold medal – first place	2015 Kerala	4×400m relay

Tintu Luka (born 26 April 1989) is an Indian track and field athlete, who predominantly competes in the middle-distance running events. Born in Valathode, Kerala, she is the national record holder in the women's 800 metres. Tintu represented India at the 2012 and 2016 Summer Olympics. In addition to being the 2015 Asian Champion in the 800 meters, she has won a total of six medals at the Asian Athletics Championships.

Tintu also competes in sprinting events including 400 metres and the 4 × 400 metres relay, and was a part of the gold medal-winning relay team at the 2013 Asian Athletics Championships and the 2014 Asian Games. She is mentored by Indian Olympian P. T. Usha, and trains at the Usha School of Athletics, Koyilandy, Kerala. She was awarded Arjuna award, the country's second-highest sporting honour by Government of India in 2014.

== Early life and junior career ==
Tintu Luka was born in the small village of Valathode near Karikkottakary in Kannur district, Kerala, India. Her parents are Lukka and Lissy, a state-level long jumper. She has a sister named Angel Lukka. Tintu did her schooling from St. Thomas High School, Karikkottakary.

In 2001, Tintu joined the PT Usha School of Athletics at Koyilandy, and started training under the guidance of her coach P T Usha. In 2008, she bagged her first international medal in form of a silver at the Junior Asian Athletics Championships.

== Performance at international level ==
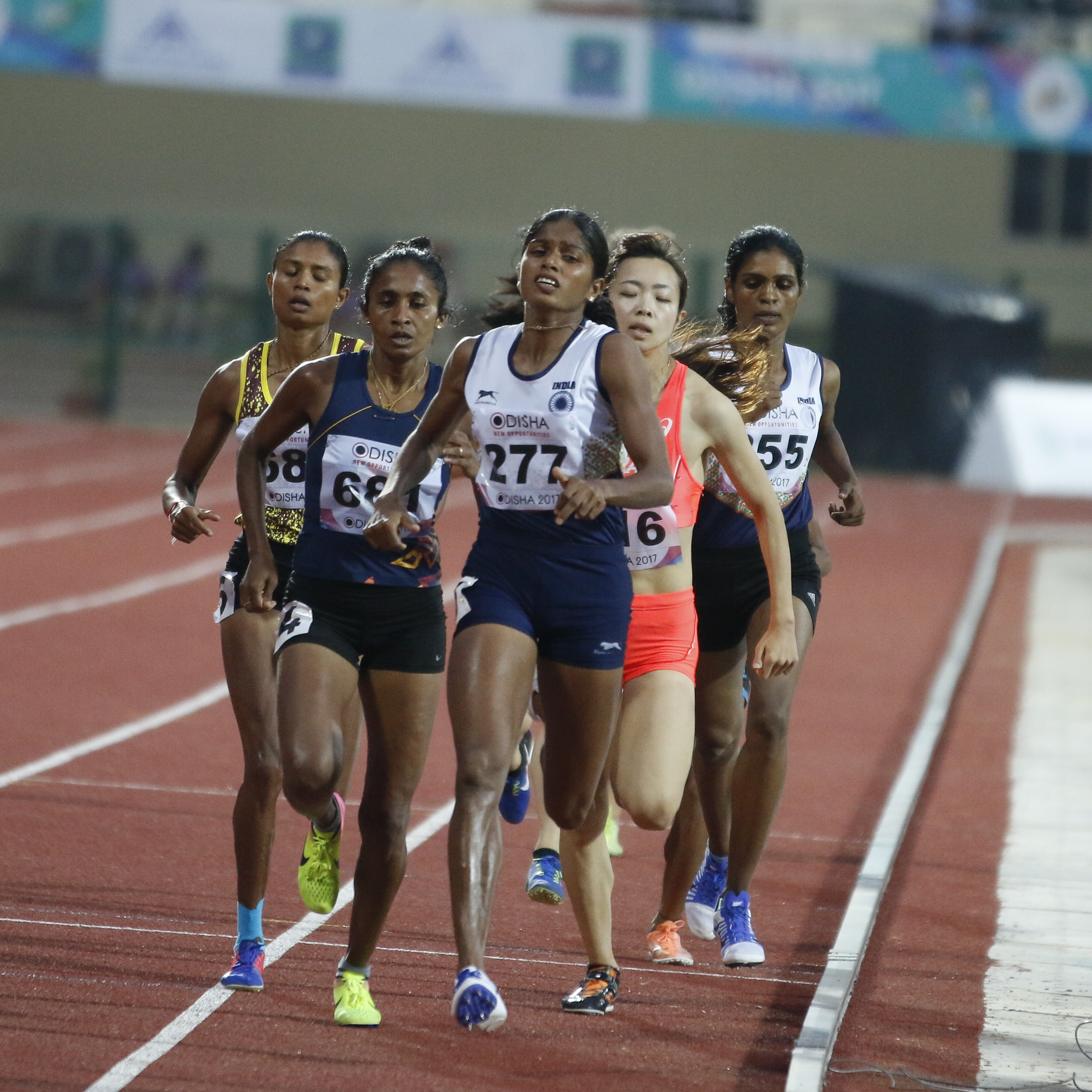
Lukka as 277 in 2017

In 2008, Tintu won a silver medal in the 800-metre race at the Asian Junior Athletics Championship in Jakarta.

At 2010 Commonwealth Games, Tintu finished in sixth place in the women's 800m with a timing of 2:01.25s. PT Usha responded to this performance, saying that Tintu Luka had not been exposed to such a large crowd before and that the crowd's applause and cheering could have made her lose concentration and run faster without prior planning.

Tintu won the bronze medal in the women's 800 metres event of the track and field competitions at the Asian Games 2010. Tintu, who had a disappointing finish in the 2010 Commonwealth Games, led the pack right from the start, but couldn't keep pace in the last 50 metres and finished third with a timing of 2:01.36 seconds.

In the Continental Cup, Croatia, 2010, Tintu timed 1:59.17, to break Shiny Wilson's 15-year-old national record of 1:59.85 in the 800m event.

In the second of the three semi-finals for 800 metres event at the London 2012 Summer Olympics, Tintu finished sixth in her heat clocking an 1:59.69 seconds her seasons best, but could not qualify for the finals. For her performance at the Summer Olympics, the Government of Kerala awarded her ₹200,000 (US$2,100) and will provide her with a job in a gazetted rank.

On 1 October 2014, Tintu won the silver medal in the 800m at the Asian Games held at Incheon, South Korea. She was also the part of the team that won the gold medal in the 4 X 400 m relay at the 2014 Asian Games. The team clocked 3:28:68 to break the Games Record. This is India's 4th consecutive gold in the event since 2002.

== Awards and recognition ==
Arjuna Award – 2014

== Competition record ==
Year	Competition	Venue	Position	Event	Notes
Representing India
2008	Asian Junior Championships	Jakarta, Indonesia	2nd	800 m	2:08.63
2008	World Junior Championships	Bydgoszcz, Poland	8th (sf)	800m	2:06.51
2008	World Junior Championships	Bydgoszcz, Poland	14th (h)	4 × 400 m relay	3:44.13
2009	Asian Championships	Guangzhou, China	6th	800 m	2:07.36
2010	Commonwealth Games	Delhi, India	6th	800 m	2:01.25
2010	Asian Games	Guangzhou, China	3rd	800 m	2:01.36
2011	Asian Championships	Kobe, Japan	3rd	800 m	2:02.55
2011	Asian Championships	Kobe, Japan	2nd	4 × 400 m relay	3:44.17
2011	World Championships	Daegu, South Korea	15th (sf)	800 m	2:00.95
2012	Summer Olympics	London, United Kingdom	10th (sf)	800 m	1:59.61
2013	Asian Championships	Pune, India	3rd	800 m	2:04.48
2013	Asian Championships	Pune, India	1st	4 × 400 m relay	3:32.26
2013	World Championships	Moscow, Russia	15th (h)	4 × 400 m relay	3:38.81
2014	Commonwealth Games	Glasgow, United Kingdom	11th (sf)	800 m	2:03.35
2014	Asian Games	Incheon, South Korea	2nd	800 m	1:59.19
2014	Asian Games	Incheon, South Korea	1st	4 × 400 m relay	3:28.68 GR
2015	Asian Championships	Wuhan, China	1st	800 m	2:01.53
2015	Asian Championships	Wuhan, China	2nd	4 × 400 m relay	3:33.81
2015	World Championships	Beijing, China	19th (h)	800 metres	2:00.95
2015	World Championships	Beijing, China	14th (h)	4 × 400 m relay	3:29.08
2016	Summer Olympics	Rio de Janeiro, Brazil	29th (h)	800 m	2:00.58
