= Zhao Jing (runner) =

Chinese middle-distance runner

Medal record

Women's athletics

Representing China

Asian Indoor Championships
Gold medal – first place	2012 Hangzhou	800 m

Zhao Jing (Chinese: 赵晶, born 9 July 1988 in Shanghai) is a Chinese athlete who specialises in the middle-distance events. She won the bronze medal in the 800 metres at the 2014 Asian Games. She won a middle-distance double for her province at the 12th Chinese National Games in 2013.

== Competition record ==
Year	Competition	Venue	Position	Event	Notes
Representing China
2011	Universiade	Shenzhen, China	5th	800 m	2:02.10
2012	Asian Indoor Championships	Hangzhou, China	1st	800 m	2:04.15
2013	East Asian Games	Tianjin, China	1st	1500 m	4:17.87
2014	Asian Games	Incheon, South Korea	3rd	800 m	1:59.48
2015	Asian Championships	Wuhan, China	2nd	1500 m	4:29.40
2015	World Championships	Beijing, China	37th (h)	800 m	2:03.08

== Personal bests ==
Outdoor

- 800 metres – 1:59.48 (Incheon 2014)
- 1000 metres – 2:40.53 (Changbaishan 2014)
- 1500 metres – 4:10.67 (Hefei 2011)

Indoor

- 800 metres – 2:04.15 (Hangzhou 2012)
