= Genzeb Shumi =

Ethiopian-Bahraini middle-distance runner (born 1991)

Medal record

Women's athletics

Representing Bahrain

Pan Arab Games
Gold medal – first place	2011 Doha	1500 m
Silver medal – second place	2011 Doha	800 m

Military World Games
Bronze medal – third place	2011 Rio de Janeiro	1500 m

Asian Championships
Gold medal – first place	2011 Kobe	1500 m

Asian Indoor Championships
Gold medal – first place	2012 Hangzhou	1500 m
Silver medal – second place	2012 Hangzhou	800 m

Asian Junior Championships
Gold medal – first place	2010 Hanoi	1500 m
Silver medal – second place	2010 Hanoi	3000 m

Genzeb Shumi Regasa (also known as Genzebe Shami Regassa, born 29 January 1991) is an Ethiopian-born middle-distance runner who competes internationally for Bahrain. She won the 1500 metres gold medal at the Asian Athletics Championships in 2011 and the Asian Indoor Athletics Championships in 2012. Her personal bests are 2:01.18 minutes for the 800 metres and 4:05.16 minutes for the 1500 m.

== Career ==
Born in Ethiopia, she began running for Bahrain in 2010, making her debut in the junior race at the 2010 IAAF World Cross Country Championships and finishing seventeenth. She broke the national junior records for the 800 metres and 1500 metres events that year. She won the 1500 m title at the 2010 Asian Junior Athletics Championships and was runner-up in the 3000 metres event. She ran on the global stage at the 2010 World Junior Championships in Athletics a few weeks later and after running a Bahraini junior record of 4:14.05 minutes in the heats, she was slower in the 1500 m final and finished tenth. She set an 800 m junior record of 2:04.09 minutes in the heats at the 2010 Asian Games, but was again slower in the final, taking eighth place.

She marked herself out as one of the regions top runners in 2011. Moving into the senior ranks at the age of twenty, she placed 30th at the 2011 IAAF World Cross Country Championships. She ran a 1500 m best of 4:11.27 minutes in Tomblaine in June. She won that event at the 2011 Asian Athletics Championships the following month (her first regional title) and also placed fifth in the 800 m. In Rio de Janeiro's 2011 Military World Games, she was the 1500 m bronze medalist. Genzeb was one of three Ethiopian-born Bahrainis to be entered into the women's 1500 m at the 2011 World Championships in Athletics alongside Mimi Belete and defending champion Maryam Yusuf Jamal. She was eliminated in the heats stage, however, in her first major world track appearance. She returned to regional competition at the end of the year, winning a middle distance double at the Arab Athletics Championships in Al Ain and taking the 800 m silver and 1500 m gold medals at the 2011 Pan Arab Games.

She collected further medals at the 2012 Asian Indoor Athletics Championships, taking the 1500 m title and finishing second to Zhao Jing in the 800 m. Following this she won her first cross country medal at the Asian Championship meet, taking third place in a Bahraini podium sweep with Shitaye Eshete and Tejitu Daba. She ran in the 800 m and 1500 m at the 2012 Summer Olympics, reaching the semifinals of the 800 m.
