= 2023 Asian Indoor Athletics Championships – Results =

These are the results of the 2023 Asian Indoor Athletics Championships which took place between 10 and 12 February 2023 in Astana, Kazakhstan.

== Men's results ==
=== 60 meters ===
Heats – 11 February

Rank	Heat	Name	Nationality	Time	Notes
1	2	Imranur Rahman	Bangladesh	6.70	Q, =SB
2	2	Shi Yuhao	China	6.71	Q
2	3	Ryota Suzuki	Japan	6.71	Q
4	2	Shak Kam Ching	Hong Kong	6.74	Q
5	1	Femi Seun Ogunode	Qatar	6.75	Q
5	3	Lee Hong Kit	Hong Kong	6.75	Q
5	4	Kim Kuk-young	South Korea	6.75	Q
8	3	Ali Anwar Ali Al-Balushi	Oman	6.77	Q
9	1	Shajar Abbas	Pakistan	6.78	Q, NR
10	4	Elakkiya Dasan	India	6.80	Q
11	1	Favoris Muzrapov	Tajikistan	6.81	Q
12	3	Meshaal Al-Mutairi	Kuwait	6.83	q
13	3	Amlan Borgohain	India	6.84	q
14	1	Huang Yi	China	6.86	q
15	2	Vitaliy Zems	Kazakhstan	6.90	q
16	3	Alisher Sadulayev	Turkmenistan	6.93	
17	4	Noureddine Hadid	Lebanon	6.94	Q
18	4	Mirhaydar Saparov	Turkmenistan	7.02	
19	1	Vong Ka In	Macau	7.08	
20	1	Sha Mahmood Noor Zahi	Afghanistan	7.10	
21	3	Danil Popov	Kazakhstan	7.11	
22	4	Sorsy Phomphakdi	Laos	7.12	
23	2	Lam Cho Kei	Macau	7.14	
	2	Ildar Ahmadiev	Tajikistan	DNS	
	4	Andrey Lavrushenko	Kazakhstan	DQ	FS
	4	Eric Shauwn Cray	Philippines	DNS	

Semifinals – 11 February

Rank	Heat	Name	Nationality	Time	Notes
1	1	Imranur Rahman	Bangladesh	6.61	Q, NR
2	1	Femi Seun Ogunode	Qatar	6.61	Q
3	2	Ryota Suzuki	Japan	6.68	Q
4	1	Shi Yuhao	China	6.69	Q
5	1	Shak Kam Ching	Hong Kong	6.70	Q
5	2	Ali Anwar Ali Al-Balushi	Oman	6.70	Q
7	2	Lee Hong Kit	Hong Kong	6.72	Q
8	2	Shajar Abbas	Pakistan	6.75	Q, NR
9	1	Elakkiya Dasan	India	6.77	
10	2	Huang Yi	China	6.79	
11	2	Amlan Borgohain	India	6.85	
12	2	Favoris Muzrapov	Tajikistan	6.85	
13	1	Vitaliy Zems	Kazakhstan	6.90	
14	1	Noureddine Hadid	Lebanon	6.98	
	2	Kim Kuk-young	South Korea	DQ	FS
	1	Meshaal Al-Mutairi	Kuwait	DNS	

Final – 11 February

Rank	Lane	Name	Nationality	Time	Notes
1st place, gold medalist(s)	3	Imranur Rahman	Bangladesh	6.59	NR
2nd place, silver medalist(s)	2	Shak Kam Ching	Hong Kong	6.65	NR
3rd place, bronze medalist(s)	5	Ryota Suzuki	Japan	6.66	PB
4	4	Femi Seun Ogunode	Qatar	6.67	
5	6	Ali Anwar Ali Al-Balushi	Oman	6.69	
6	7	Shi Yuhao	China	6.70	
7	1	Shajar Abbas	Pakistan	6.71	NR
8	8	Lee Hong Kit	Hong Kong	6.77	

=== 400 meters ===
Heats – 10 February

Rank	Heat	Name	Nationality	Time	Notes
1	3	Mikhail Litvin	Kazakhstan	47.15	Q
2	2	Ammar Ismail Ibrahim	Qatar	47.61	Q
3	2	Yasir Ali Al-Saadi	Iraq	47.72	Q
4	3	Fan Tianrui	China	48.13	Q
5	1	Gu Xiaofei	China	49.09	Q
6	1	Elnor Mukhitdinov	Kazakhstan	49.09	Q
7	2	Vyacheslav Zems	Kazakhstan	49.39	Q
8	1	Mohamad Merhe Mortada	Lebanon	49.59	Q
9	1	Uzair Rehman	Pakistan	49.79	q
10	3	Mohammd Al-Atiah	Kuwait	49.84	Q
11	2	Leonid Pronzhenko	Tajikistan	52.73	q
12	3	Aleksandr Pronzhenko	Tajikistan	53.17	q
	2	Sadykzhan Shakhzatbek	Kyrgyzstan	DQ	R17.4.3
	3	Eric Shauwn Cray	Philippines	DNF	

Semifinals – 10 February

Rank	Heat	Name	Nationality	Time	Notes
1	2	Ammar Ismail Ibrahim	Qatar	46.70	Q
2	1	Mikhail Litvin	Kazakhstan	46.97	Q
3	1	Yasir Ali Al-Saadi	Iraq	47.18	Q
4	2	Vyacheslav Zems	Kazakhstan	47.32	Q
5	1	Fan Tianrui	China	47.69	Q
6	2	Gu Xiaofei	China	48.32	Q
7	2	Elnor Mukhitdinov	Kazakhstan	48.39	
8	1	Mohamad Merhe Mortada	Lebanon	48.95	
9	2	Uzair Rehman	Pakistan	49.22	
10	1	Mohammd Al-Atiah	Kuwait	49.37	
11	2	Leonid Pronzhenko	Tajikistan	52.84	
12	1	Aleksandr Pronzhenko	Tajikistan	52.96	

Final – 11 February

Rank	Lane	Name	Nationality	Time	Notes
1st place, gold medalist(s)	6	Ammar Ismail Ibrahim	Qatar	46.25	PB
2nd place, silver medalist(s)	5	Mikhail Litvin	Kazakhstan	46.39	SB
3rd place, bronze medalist(s)	2	Fan Tianrui	China	47.30	
4	4	Yasir Ali Al-Saadi	Iraq	47.77	
5	1	Gu Xiaofei	China	48.60	
6	6	Vyacheslav Zems	Kazakhstan	48.85	

=== 800 meters ===
Heats – 10 February

Rank	Heat	Name	Nationality	Time	Notes
1	1	Ebrahim Al-Zofairi	Kuwait	1:51.18	Q
2	1	Abdirahman Saeed Hassan	Qatar	1:51.21	Q
3	1	Kentaro Usuda	Japan	1:51.35	q
4	1	Sami Masoud Al-Yami	Saudi Arabia	1:51.40	q
5	2	Musaab Abdelrahman Bala	Qatar	1:52.76	Q
6	2	Mikuto Kaneko	Japan	1:52.88	Q
7	2	Li Jun-lin	China	1:52.97	
8	2	Abdulyaziz Abdukayumov	Kazakhstan	1:53.67	
9	1	Sergey Sukhov	Kazakhstan	1:54.08	
10	2	Duman Gabdygaliyev	Kazakhstan	1:56.05	
11	2	Sulaiman Zhusup	Kyrgyzstan	1:57.17	
12	1	Mukumbek Maisal	Kyrgyzstan	1:59.73	
13	2	Muhammadrizo Mirzozoda	Tajikistan	2:03.26	

Final – 12 February

Rank	Name	Nationality	Time	Notes
1st place, gold medalist(s)	Ebrahim Al-Zofairi	Kuwait	1:49.33	PB
2nd place, silver medalist(s)	Abdirahman Saeed Hassan	Qatar	1:49.58	
3rd place, bronze medalist(s)	Musaab Abdelrahman Bala	Qatar	1:49.68	
4	Sami Masoud Al-Yami	Saudi Arabia	1:50.66	
5	Mikuto Kaneko	Japan	1:51.04	
6	Kentaro Usuda	Japan	1:52.06	

=== 1500 meters ===
11 February

Rank	Name	Nationality	Time	Notes
1st place, gold medalist(s)	Kazuto Iizawa	Japan	3:42.83	SB
2nd place, silver medalist(s)	Mohamad Al-Garni	Qatar	3:43.39	
3rd place, bronze medalist(s)	Musaab Adam Ali	Qatar	3:43.42	
4	Nanami Arai	Japan	3:44.79	
5	Maxim Frolovskiy	Kazakhstan	3:50.11	
6	Rakhimzhan Kelmanov	Kazakhstan	3:50.63	
7	Musulman Dzholomanov	Kyrgyzstan	3:51.78	
8	Mohammed Abdullah Mahal Mahal	Iraq	3:54.79	
9	Lương Đức Phước	Vietnam	3:55.21	
10	Vadim Levchenkov	Kazakhstan	3:59.90	
	Fayez Abdullah Al-Subaie	Saudi Arabia	DQ	R17.4.3
	Jalil Naseri	Iran	DQ	

=== 3000 meters ===
12 February

Rank	Name	Nationality	Time	Notes
1st place, gold medalist(s)	Mohamad Al-Garni	Qatar	7:55.25	
2nd place, silver medalist(s)	Keita Sato	Japan	7:56.41	
3rd place, bronze medalist(s)	Shadrack Kimutai Koech	Kazakhstan	7:59.84	
4	Yuta Bando	Japan	8:00.15	
5	Wang Fudong	China	8:20.66	
6	Nguyễn Trung Cường	Vietnam	8:20.81	
7	Alexey Gussarov	Kazakhstan	8:22.52	
8	Jalil Naseri	Iran	8:22.72	
9	Fayez Abdullah Al-Subaie	Saudi Arabia	8:23.66	
10	Musulman Dzholomanov	Kyrgyzstan	8:26.95	
11	Maxim Frolovskiy	Kazakhstan	8:29.85	
12	Husain Kamal	Kuwait	8:33.16	
13	Abdulrahman Abdulrahman	Kuwait	8:35.43	
14	Mohammed Abdullah Mahal Mahal	Iraq	8:45.04	
	Musaab Adam Ali	Qatar	DNS	

=== 60 meters hurdles ===
Heats – 11 February

Rank	Heat	Name	Nationality	Time	Notes
1	3	David Yefremov	Kazakhstan	7.66	Q
2	2	Yaqoub Al-Youha	Kuwait	7.71	Q
3	2	Shuhei Ishikawa	Japan	7.71	Q
4	3	Chen Kuei-ru	Chinese Taipei	7.74	Q
5	2	Kim Gyeong-tae	South Korea	7.79	q
6	1	Cheung Wang Fung	Hong Kong	7.83	Q, NR
7	3	Wong Lok Hei Addis	Hong Kong	7.90	q
8	1	Ang Chen Xiang	Singapore	7.94	Q
9	1	Tejas Shirse	India	7.94	
10	1	John Cabang	Philippines	7.96	
11	2	Yevgeniy Prokudin	Kazakhstan	7.97	
12	2	Saeed Othman Al-Absi	Qatar	8.04	
13	1	Danila Korr	Kazakhstan	8.12	
13	3	Ergash Normurodov	Uzbekistan	8.12	
	2	Mohammed Sad Nadhim Al-Khfaji	Iraq	DNF	
	3	Masoud Kamran	Iran	DQ	
	3	Natthaphon Dansungnoen	Thailand	DQ	
	1	Shusei Nomoto	Japan	DNS	

Final – 12 February

Rank	Lane	Name	Nationality	Time	Notes
1st place, gold medalist(s)	4	David Yefremov	Kazakhstan	7.65	
2nd place, silver medalist(s)	7	Chen Kuei-ru	Chinese Taipei	7.68	SB
3rd place, bronze medalist(s)	6	Shuhei Ishikawa	Japan	7.70	
4	5	Yaqoub Al-Youha	Kuwait	7.70	
5	2	Kim Gyeong-tae	South Korea	7.73	
6	3	Cheung Wang Fung	Hong Kong	7.84	
7	8	Ang Chen Xiang	Singapore	7.94	
8	1	Wong Lok Hei Addis	Hong Kong	7.96	

=== 4 × 400 meters relay ===
12 February

Rank	Nation	Athletes	Time	Notes
1st place, gold medalist(s)	Kazakhstan	Andrey Sokolov, Elnur Mukhitdinov, Vyacheslav Zems, Mikhail Litvin	3:09.15	NR
2nd place, silver medalist(s)	Qatar	Hussain Ibrahim, Ismail Dawood, Femi Seun Ogunode, Ammar Ismail Ibrahim	3:09.26	
3rd place, bronze medalist(s)	Tajikistan	Leonid Pronzhenko, Mirsaid Mirzozoda, Mukhammadrizo Mirzozoda, Aleksandr Pronzhenko	3:34.45	NR

=== High jump ===
Qualification – 11 February

Qualifying height: 2.19 m

Rank	Name	Nationality	1.90	2.00	2.05	2.10	2.14	Result	Notes
1	Yuto Seko	Japan	–	–	–	–	o	2.14	q
1	Sarvesh Anil Kushare	India			o	o	o	2.14	q
1	Fatak Bait Jaboob	Oman			o	o	o	2.14	q
1	Woo Sang-hyeok	South Korea	–	–	–	–	o	2.14	q
1	Sharoz Khan	Pakistan			o	o	o	2.14	q
1	Majd Eddin Ghazal	Syria	–	–	–	o	o	2.14	q
7	Ryoichi Akamatsu	Japan	–	–	–	–	xo	2.14	q
7	Leonard Grospe	Philippines			o	o	xo	2.14	q, NR
9	Wang Zhen	China			xo	o	xxo	2.14	q
10	Igor Kosolapov	Kazakhstan			o	o	xxx	2.10	
11	Wu Guobiao	China			o	xo	xxx	2.10	
12	Michael John Kennelly	Hong Kong		o	o	xxx		2.05	
13	Hussein Falah Al-Ibraheemi	Iraq			xo	xxx		2.05	
14	Muhammad Imran	Pakistan			xxo	xxx		2.05	
15	Akylzhan Toktagalin	Kazakhstan	o	xo	xxo	xxx		2.05	
16	Aleksandr Timoshkin	Kazakhstan			xxx			2.00	
17	Aromal Thulaseedharan Pillai	India		xo	xxx			2.00	
17	Hashem Al-Ali	Kuwait		xo	xxx			2.00	

Final – 12 February

Rank	Name	Nationality	2.10	2.15	2.20	2.24	2.28	2.30	Result	Notes
1st place, gold medalist(s)	Ryoichi Akamatsu	Japan	–	o	o	o	xo	xxx	2.28	PB
2nd place, silver medalist(s)	Woo Sang-hyeok	South Korea	–	o	o	o	x–	xx	2.24	SB
3rd place, bronze medalist(s)	Majd Eddin Ghazal	Syria	o	o	o	xxo	xxx		2.24	SB
4	Yuto Seko	Japan	–	xo	xxo	xxo	xxx		2.24	
5	Fatak Bait Jaboob	Oman	o	o	xo	xxx			2.20	
6	Sarvesh Anil Kushare	India	o	o	xxo	xxx			2.20	
7	Leonard Grospe	Philippines	xo	xxo	xxx				2.15	NR
8	Sharoz Khan	Pakistan	o	xxx					2.10	
	Wang Zhen	China	xxx						NM	

=== Pole vault ===
12 February

Rank	Name	Nationality	4.60	4.80	5.00	5.15	5.25	5.30	5.35	5.40	5.45	5.61	Result	Notes
1st place, gold medalist(s)	Hussain Asim Al-Hizam	Saudi Arabia	–	–	–	–	xxo	–	xxo	o	xxo	xxx	5.45	
2nd place, silver medalist(s)	Seifeldin Mohamed Abdelsalam	Qatar	–	o	o	xo	xo	o	xo	xxx			5.35	NR
3rd place, bronze medalist(s)	Patsapong Amsam-ang	Thailand	–	–	o	–	xo	–	xxo	–	xxx		5.35	NR
4	Ivan Tovchenik	Kazakhstan	–	–	o	o	o	xx–	x				5.25	
5	Siva Subaramani	India	–	xo	o	xo	xxx						5.15	
6	Arshia Mossddeghi	Iran	–	o	o	xxx							5.00	
7	Danil Polyanskiy	Kazakhstan	o	o	xxx								4.80	
8	Jaffar Ashraf	Pakistan	–	xo	xxx								4.80	
9	Vladislav Garbuznyak	Kazakhstan	xo	xo	xxx								4.80	
10	Low Jun Yu	Singapore	xo	xxx									4.60	
	Parshant Singh Kanhiya	India	–	xxx									NM	
	Koh Wei Shien	Singapore	xxx										NM	
	Ali Al-Sabaghah	Kuwait	xxx										NM	

=== Long jump ===
Qualification – 10 February

Qualifying mark: 7.95 m

Rank	Name	Nationality	#1	#2	#3	Result	Notes
1	Jeswin Aldrin	India	7.36	7.69	7.93	7.93	q, NR
2	Lin Yu-tang	Chinese Taipei	7.79	7.80		7.80	q
3	Natsuki Yamakawa	Japan	7.70	7.51		7.70	q
4	Zhang Mingkun	China	7.59			7.66	q
4	Wen Hua-yu	Chinese Taipei	x	7.66		7.66	q
6	Anvar Anvarov	Uzbekistan	7.65	7.62		7.65	q
6	Ko Ho Long	Hong Kong	7.65	7.56	x	7.65	q
8	Chang Ming Tai	Hong Kong	7.59	x	7.64	7.64	q
9	Muhammed Anees Yahiya	India	7.45	6.56	7.48	7.48	
10	Janry Ubas	Philippines	7.35	7.17	7.42	7.42	
11	Bagrat Gasanbekov	Turkmenistan	7.36	7.31		7.36	
12	Timur Isakov	Kyrgyzstan	7.04	7.20	7.23	7.23	
13	Sergey Stepankovskiy	Kazakhstan	7.17	7.09	x	7.17	
14	Ildar Ahmadiev	Tajikistan	x	6.27	7.13	7.13	
15	Hamoud Ali Olwani	Saudi Arabia		7.04		7.04	
16	Abdullah Al-Mershed	Kuwait	5.07	6.71	6.88	6.88	
17	Zelimkhan Nassyrov	Kazakhstan	x	x	5.17	5.17	
	Mohammad Amin Al-Salami	Syria				DNS	

Final – 12 February

Rank	Name	Nationality	#1	#2	#3	#4	#5	#6	Result	Notes
1st place, gold medalist(s)	Lin Yu-tang	Chinese Taipei	7.69	x	8.02	7.94	7.85	x	8.02	NR
2nd place, silver medalist(s)	Jeswin Aldrin	India	x	7.97	x	x	x	7.82	7.97	NR
3rd place, bronze medalist(s)	Zhang Mingkun	China	7.92	7.89	7.74	x	x	x	7.92	PB
4	Wen Hua-yu	Chinese Taipei	7.65	x	7.71	7.82	x	x	7.82	
5	Natsuki Yamakawa	Japan	7.50	7.71	7.48	x	7.68	7.76	7.76	
6	Chang Ming Tai	Hong Kong	7.42	x	7.50	7.71	x	7.76	7.76	
7	Anvar Anvarov	Uzbekistan	7.53	7.57	7.57	7.57	7.66	7.65	7.66	
8	Ko Ho Long	Hong Kong	7.66	x	7.43	x	x	7.53	7.66	

=== Triple jump ===
10 February

Rank	Name	Nationality	#1	#2	#3	#4	#5	#6	Result	Notes
1st place, gold medalist(s)	Fang Yaoqing	China	x	17.20	16.83	–	–	–	17.20	CR, PB
2nd place, silver medalist(s)	Praveen Chithravel	India	16.04	16.98	16.94	16.97	16.82	16.70	16.98	NR
3rd place, bronze medalist(s)	Yu Kyu-min	South Korea	16.23	16.73	x	x	16.37	x	16.73	PB
4	Su Wen	China	16.35	x	16.47	16.66	16.65	16.68	16.68	
5	Kim Jang-woo	South Korea	16.25	16.20	16.39	16.39	16.36	x	16.39	
6	Li Yun-chen	Chinese Taipei	16.28	15.99	15.55	15.89	x	16.23	16.28	
7	Ivan Denisov	Uzbekistan	16.09	16.10	x	x	x	x	16.10	
8	Hamidreza Kia	Iran	15.69	x	15.92	15.75	x	15.91	15.92	
9	Ruki Ito	Japan	15.91	15.57	15.71				15.91	
10	Mark Harry Diones	Philippines	15.54	15.73	15.77				15.77	
11	Yevgeniy Kissilev	Kazakhstan	15.73	15.72	x				15.73	
12	Arun A.B.	India	x	x	14.12				14.12	
	Khaled Al-Subaie	Kuwait	x	x	–				NM	
	Petr Medvedev	Kazakhstan	x	x	x				NM	
	Roman Pak	Kazakhstan	x	x	x				NM	

=== Shot put ===
10 February

Rank	Name	Nationality	#1	#2	#3	#4	#5	#6	Result	Notes
1st place, gold medalist(s)	Tajinderpal Singh Toor	India	x	19.45	19.49	19.42	19.49	x	19.49	PB
2nd place, silver medalist(s)	Karanveer Singh	India	17.61	19.37	19.20	19.33	18.57	x	19.37	PB
3rd place, bronze medalist(s)	Chen Xiaodong	China	17.73	18.85	18.82	18.52	x	18.62	18.85	PB
4	Ivan Ivanov	Kazakhstan	x	18.10	17.78	x	17.83	x	18.10	
5	Ebrahim Al-Fadhli	Kuwait	16.11	17.17	x	x	x	x	17.17	
6	Daniil Plotnikov	Kazakhstan	14.28	14.12	x	14.48	14.51	14.53	14.53	
7	Artur Gafner	Kazakhstan	x	14.06	13.85	x	x	14.44	14.44	

=== Heptathlon ===
11–12 February

The highest mark recorded in each event is highlighted in yellow

Rank	Athlete	Nationality	60m	LJ	SP	HJ	60m H	PV	1000m	Points	Notes
1st place, gold medalist(s)	Yuma Maruyama	Japan	7.09	7.19	13.54	1.97	7.96	4.70	2:46.38	5801	PB
2nd place, silver medalist(s)	Keisuke Okuda	Japan	6.90	7.12	14.08	1.82	8.39	4.70	3:00.95	5497	PB
3rd place, bronze medalist(s)	Janry Ubas	Philippines	7.10	7.66	11.32	2.00	8.60	4.70	3:22.49	5306	NR
4	Suttisak Singkhon	Thailand	7.21	6.86	12.88	1.91	8.60	4.20	3:03.35	5114	
5	Zakhiriddin Shokirov	Uzbekistan	7.42	7.01	12.56	1.94	8.95	3.90	2:58.74	4968	
6	Saeed Abdullah Mobarak	Saudi Arabia	7.38	6.54	10.75	1.79	8.56	4.10	2:46.17	4906	
7	Sergey Dementev	Kazakhstan	7.50	6.63	11.64	2.00	8.83	3.90	3:02.94	4838	
8	Choe Dong-hwi	South Korea	7.32	6.91	12.44	1.88	8.29	NM	DNF	3803	
9	Leonid Pronzhenko	Tajikistan	7.56	5.84	10.12	NM	8.95	NM	2:55.79	3202	

== Women's results ==
=== 60 meters ===
Heats – 10 February

Rank	Heat	Name	Nationality	Time	Notes
1	1	Farzaneh Fasihi	Iran	7.23	Q
2	1	Olga Safronova	Kazakhstan	7.33	Q
3	1	Valentin Vanesa Lonteng	Indonesia	7.36	q, NR
4	2	Hamideh Esmaeil Nezhad	Iran	7.41	Q
5	2	Arisa Kimishima	Japan	7.42	Q
6	3	Archana Suseentran	India	7.42	Q
7	1	Mudhawi Al-Shammari	Kuwait	7.42	q
8	1	Loi Im Lan	Macau	7.45	NR
9	2	Jyothi Yarraji	India	7.47	
10	3	Valentina Meredova	Turkmenistan	7.53	Q
11	3	Liu Guoyi	China	7.54	
12	2	Huang Ziting	China	7.56	
13	2	Rima Kashafutdinova	Kazakhstan	7.58	
14	3	Aziza Sbaity	Lebanon	7.58	
15	3	Mariyam Ru Ya Ali	Maldives	7.66	NR
16	3	Arina Misheeva	Kazakhstan	7.77	
17	2	Ahnaa Nizaar	Maldives	7.89	NR
18	2	Shirin Akter	Bangladesh	7.93	
19	3	Ruqaya Jameel Saad Al-Saeed	Iraq	7.95	
20	1	Alsu Habibulina	Turkmenistan	8.05	
21	1	Lujain Ibrahim Al-Humaid	Saudi Arabia	8.15	NR

Final – 10 February

Rank	Lane	Name	Nationality	Time	Notes
1st place, gold medalist(s)	5	Farzaneh Fasihi	Iran	7.28	
2nd place, silver medalist(s)	3	Olga Safronova	Kazakhstan	7.32	
3rd place, bronze medalist(s)	2	Valentin Vanesa Lonteng	Indonesia	7.37	
4	4	Archana Suseentran	India	7.39	
5	7	Arisa Kimishima	Japan	7.40	
6	1	Mudhawi Al-Shammari	Kuwait	7.43	
7	6	Hamideh Esmaeil Nezhad	Iran	7.48	
8	8	Valentina Meredova	Turkmenistan	7.54	

=== 400 meters ===
Heats – 10 February

Rank	Heat	Name	Nationality	Time	Notes
1	1	Elina Mikhina	Kazakhstan	54.94	Q
2	1	Sri Maya Sari	Indonesia	55.01	Q, NR
3	1	Aleksandra Zalyubovskaya	Kazakhstan	55.38	q
4	1	Laylo Allaberganova	Uzbekistan	55.52	q
5	2	Nguyễn Thị Huyền	Vietnam	55.86	Q
6	2	Farida Soliyeva	Uzbekistan	55.88	Q
7	2	Adelina Zems	Kazakhstan	55.89	
8	2	Liu Yinglan	China	55.98	

Final – 11 February

Rank	Lane	Name	Nationality	Time	Notes
1st place, gold medalist(s)	5	Elina Mikhina	Kazakhstan	54.07	
2nd place, silver medalist(s)	6	Nguyễn Thị Huyền	Vietnam	54.67	
3rd place, bronze medalist(s)	4	Sri Maya Sari	Indonesia	54.88	NR
4	2	Aleksandra Zalyubovskaya	Kazakhstan	55.43	
5	3	Farida Soliyeva	Uzbekistan	55.68	
6	1	Laylo Allaberganova	Uzbekistan	56.08	

=== 800 meters ===
12 February

Rank	Name	Nationality	Time	Notes
1st place, gold medalist(s)	Wu Hongjiao	China	2:06.85	
2nd place, silver medalist(s)	Ayano Shiomi	Japan	2:07.18	
3rd place, bronze medalist(s)	Rao Xinyu	China	2:08.75	
4	Akbayan Nurmamet	Kazakhstan	2:10.00	
5	Amal Al-Roumi	Kuwait	2:11.09	
6	Viktoriya Senkina	Kazakhstan	2:15.49	
7	Anna Shumilo	Kazakhstan	2:24.64	

=== 1500 meters ===
11 February

Rank	Name	Nationality	Time	Notes
1st place, gold medalist(s)	Nguyễn Thị Oanh	Vietnam	4:15.55	NR
2nd place, silver medalist(s)	Yume Goto	Japan	4:19.29	
3rd place, bronze medalist(s)	Akbayan Nurmamet	Kazakhstan	4:21.31	
4	Ran Urabe	Japan	4:21.54	
5	Madina Kerimova	Kazakhstan	4:24.09	
6	Ainuska Kalil Kyzy	Kyrgyzstan	4:26.96	
7	Amal Al-Roumi	Kuwait	4:29.62	NR
	Caroline Chepkoech Kipkirui	Kazakhstan	DNS	

=== 3000 meters ===
10 February

Rank	Name	Nationality	Time	Notes
1st place, gold medalist(s)	Caroline Chepkoech Kipkirui	Kazakhstan	9:01.98	
2nd place, silver medalist(s)	He Wuga	China	9:03.43	
3rd place, bronze medalist(s)	Yuma Yamamoto	Japan	9:09.29	
4	Ririka Hironaka	Japan	9:10.77	
5	Ainuska Kalil Kyzy	Kyrgyzstan	9:18.41	
6	Nguyễn Thị Oanh	Vietnam	9:18.41	
7	Norah Jeruto	Kazakhstan	9:29.27	
8	Tatyana Neroznak	Kazakhstan	9:36.04	

=== 60 meters hurdles ===
Heats – 11 February

Rank	Heat	Name	Nationality	Time	Notes
1	1	Jyothi Yarraji	India	8.16	Q, NR
2	2	Chisato Kiyoyama	Japan	8.21	Q
3	1	Dina Aulia	Indonesia	8.31	Q, NR
4	1	Yuliya Bashmanova	Kazakhstan	8.32	Q
5	1	Chen Jiamin	China	8.33	q
6	2	Shing Cho Yan	Hong Kong	8.34	Q
7	2	Dai Yiru	China	8.38	Q
8	1	Masumi Aoki	Japan	8.51	q
9	1	Lidiya Podsepkina	Uzbekistan	8.55	
10	2	Sapna Kumari	India	8.61	
11	1	Anel Shulakova	Kazakhstan	8.73	
12	2	Anna Dubina	Kazakhstan	8.77	
13	2	Kurdstan Bamo Jamal Jamal	Iraq	8.90	
14	1	Angelina Tiapova	Kyrgyzstan	9.02	
	2	Valentina Kibalnikova	Uzbekistan	DNF	

Final – 12 February

Rank	Lane	Name	Nationality	Time	Notes
1st place, gold medalist(s)	1	Masumi Aoki	Japan	8.01	CR, NR
2nd place, silver medalist(s)	4	Jyothi Yarraji	India	8.13	NR
3rd place, bronze medalist(s)	2	Chen Jiamin	China	8.15	
4	5	Chisato Kiyoyama	Japan	8.20	
5	3	Dina Aulia	Indonesia	8.24	NR
6	7	Yuliya Bashmanova	Kazakhstan	8.25	
7	8	Dai Yiru	China	8.27	
8	6	Shing Cho Yan	Hong Kong	8.38	

=== 4 × 400 meters relay ===
12 February

Rank	Nation	Athletes	Time	Notes
1st place, gold medalist(s)	Kazakhstan	Adelina Zems, Aleksandra Zalyubovskaya, Kristina Kondrashova, Elina Mikhina	3:44.21	
2nd place, silver medalist(s)	Uzbekistan	Laylo Allaberganova, Kamila Mirsolieva, Malika Radzhabova, Farida Soliyeva	3:46.45	NR

=== High jump ===
12 February

Rank	Name	Nationality	1.65	1.70	1.75	1.80	1.84	1.87	1.89	1.91	Result	Notes
1st place, gold medalist(s)	Nadezhda Dubovitskaya	Kazakhstan	–	–	–	o	o	–	o	xxx	1.89	
2nd place, silver medalist(s)	Kristina Ovchinnikova	Kazakhstan	–	–	o	xo	o	xxo	o	xxx	1.89	
3rd place, bronze medalist(s)	Yelizaveta Matveyeva	Kazakhstan	–	o	o	xo	xxo	xxx			1.84	
4	Chung Wai Yan	Hong Kong	o	o	o	o	xxx				1.80	
5	Barnokhon Sayfullaeva	Uzbekistan	o	o	xo	xxo	xxx				1.80	
6	Abhinaya Shetty	India	o	o	o	xxx					1.75	
6	Shao Yuqi	China	o	o	o	xxx					1.75	
8	Maryam Abdulelah	Iraq	o	o	xo	xxx					1.75	

=== Pole vault ===
11 February

Rank	Name	Nationality	3.40	3.60	3.70	3.80	3.90	4.00	4.10	Result	Notes
1st place, gold medalist(s)	Mayu Nasu	Japan	–	–	–	o	o	o	xxx	4.00	
2nd place, silver medalist(s)	Pavithra Vengatesh	India	–	–	–	xo	o	o	xxx	4.00	
3rd place, bronze medalist(s)	Rosy Meena Paulraj	India	–	o	o	o	xxo	xxx		3.90	
4	Polina Ivanova	Kazakhstan	–	o	o	o	xxx			3.80	
5	Anastassiya Ermakova	Kazakhstan	–	–	–	xo	–	xxx		3.80	
6	Jasmina Mansurova	Uzbekistan	o	o	xxx					3.60	

=== Long jump ===
12 February

Rank	Name	Nationality	#1	#2	#3	#4	#5	#6	Result	Notes
1st place, gold medalist(s)	Sumire Hata	Japan	6.51	x	6.54	6.62	6.46	6.64	6.64	CR, NR
2nd place, silver medalist(s)	Huang Yingying	China	6.26	6.31	6.18	6.32	6.43	x	6.43	
3rd place, bronze medalist(s)	Darya Reznichenko	Uzbekistan	6.23	6.37	6.20	6.28	6.34	x	6.37	
4	Gong Luying	China	6.35	x	x	x	x	5.95	6.35	
5	Shaili Singh	India	5.99	6.09	6.27	5.95	6.10	6.25	6.27	
6	Anastassiya Rypakova	Kazakhstan	6.16	6.25	x	6.12	x	x	6.25	
7	Ayaka Kora	Japan	6.09	6.09	6.14	5.97	x	6.05	6.14	
8	Yue Nga Yan	Hong Kong	6.02	5.91	5.87	x	x	6.04	6.04	NR
9	Reihaneh Mobini	Iran	5.79	x	5.61				5.79	
10	Chan Ka Sin	Hong Kong	x	5.69	4.88				5.69	
11	Anastassiya Kononovich	Kazakhstan	x	5.37	5.49				5.49	
12	Sou I Man	Macau	5.30	x	5.15				5.30	
13	Svetlana Maier	Kyrgyzstan	4.78	x	5.20				5.20	
14	Valeriya Safonova	Kazakhstan	x	x	4.88				4.88	

=== Triple jump ===
11 February

Rank	Name	Nationality	#1	#2	#3	#4	#5	#6	Result	Notes
1st place, gold medalist(s)	Sharifa Davronova	Uzbekistan	13.98	13.72	x	13.40	–	–	13.98	
2nd place, silver medalist(s)	Mariko Morimoto	Japan	13.42	x	x	x	13.66	13.46	13.66	
3rd place, bronze medalist(s)	Chen Ting	China	13.11	13.28	12.51	13.30	13.52	13.48	13.52	
4	Poorva Hitesh Sawant	India	12.46	12.77	12.56	12.52	12.98	13.06	13.06	
5	Chan Shannon Vera	Hong Kong	11.92	12.53	12.43	12.37	12.45	12.57	12.57	
6	Valeriya Safonova	Kazakhstan	12.16	12.34	12.39	x	12.44	12.36	12.44	
7	Sheena Varkey	India	12.30	12.01	11.87	–	–	–	12.30	
8	Olga Ovsekova	Kazakhstan	x	11.94	11.38	x	x	11.88	11.94	

=== Shot put ===
11 February

Rank	Name	Nationality	#1	#2	#3	#4	#5	#6	Result	Notes
1st place, gold medalist(s)	Jeong Yu-sun	South Korea	15.20	15.26	x	16.98	x	15.89	16.98	
2nd place, silver medalist(s)	Lee Soo-jung	South Korea	15.82	16.23	x	15.52	16.45	x	16.45	
3rd place, bronze medalist(s)	Eki Febri Ekawati	Indonesia	14.44	14.87	15.44	x	14.51	x	15.44	NR
4	Nadezhda Barbanova	Kazakhstan	13.97	14.12	x	14.89	15.09	13.87	15.09	
5	Abha Khatua	India	11.94	x	14.38	14.80	x	x	14.80	
6	Sabina Potapova	Kazakhstan	12.75	13.22	13.64	x	13.07	12.83	13.64	
7	Karina Vassileva	Kazakhstan	10.20	10.94	10.23	10.81	10.69	10.82	10.94	

=== Pentathlon ===
10 February

The highest mark recorded in each event is highlighted in yellow

Rank	Athlete	Nationality	60m H	HJ	SP	LJ	800m	Points	Notes
1st place, gold medalist(s)	Ekaterina Voronina	Uzbekistan	8.76	1.81	13.47	5.88	2:17.22	4386	NR
2nd place, silver medalist(s)	Swapna Barman	India	8.64	1.75	12.13	5.91	2:27.57	4119	NR
3rd place, bronze medalist(s)	Yuki Yamasaki	Japan	8.67	1.63	12.56	5.78	2:18.32	4078	
4	Alina Chistyakova	Kazakhstan	8.88	1.72	9.97	6.04	2:20.66	4018	
5	Ekaterina Avdeenko	Kazakhstan	9.27	1.72	11.76	5.80	2:19.38	3999	
6	Nadezhda Bogdanova	Kazakhstan	9.03	1.63	12.44	5.35	2:20.50	3839	
7	Fatemeh Mohitizadeh	Iran	8.68	1.66	11.53	5.62	2:30.53	3835	
8	Sowmiya Murugan	India	8.88	1.60	12.25	5.51	2:37.47	3654	
9	Sarah Dequinan	Philippines	9.52	1.66	10.65	5.66	2:37.55	3530	
