= 2024 Asian Indoor Athletics Championships – Results =

These are the results of the 2024 Asian Indoor Athletics Championships which took place between 17 and 19 February 2024 in Tehran, Iran.

== Men's results ==
=== 60 metres ===
Heats – 18 February

Rank	Heat	Name	Nationality	Time	Notes
1	3	Ali Anwar Ali Al-Balushi	Oman	6.56	Q, NR
2	1	Shuhei Tada	Japan	6.60	Q
2	2	Jo Kum Ryong	North Korea	6.60	Q
4	3	Imranur Rahman	Bangladesh	6.62	Q
5	1	Deng Xinrui	China	6.69	Q
5	2	Hassan Taftian	Iran	6.69	Q
7	4	Murtadha Al-Kemawee	Iraq	6.73	Q, NR
8	1	Chan Yat Lok	Hong Kong	6.74	Q, NU20R
9	2	Vadivelu Kannadasan Elakkiya Dasan	India	6.75	Q
10	1	Favoris Muzrapov	Tajikistan	6.77	q, NR
10	2	Liu Shuoyuan	China	6.77	q
10	4	Almat Tulebayev	Kazakhstan	6.77	Q
13	2	Kwok Chun Ting	Hong Kong	6.80	q
14	3	Chan Kin Wa	Macau	6.81	Q, NR
14	4	Meshaal Al-Mutairi	Kuwait	6.81	Q
16	3	Benyamin Yousefi	Iran	6.82	
17	1	Masih Moradi	Iran	6.87	
18	4	Md Rakibul Hasan	Bangladesh	6.87	
19	4	Femi Seun Ogunode	Qatar	6.92	
20	4	Ildar Akhmadiev	Tajikistan	6.93	
21	3	Alisher Sadulayev	Turkmenistan	6.94	
22	1	Hassan Saaid	Maldives	6.95	
23	1	Shah Mahmood Noor Zahi	Afghanistan	6.97	NR
24	4	Lukman Gurbandurdyyev	Turkmenistan	6.98	
25	3	Hassan Azizi	Afghanistan	7.53	
	2	Tosin Ogunode	Qatar	?	q

Semifinals – 18 February

Rank	Heat	Name	Nationality	Time	Notes
1	1	Ali Anwar Ali Al-Balushi	Oman	6.50	Q, CR, NR
2	2	Shuhei Tada	Japan	6.53	Q, =NR
3	1	Imranur Rahman	Bangladesh	6.60	Q
4	1	Tosin Ogunode	Qatar	6.61	Q
4	2	Jo Kum Ryong	North Korea	6.61	Q
6	2	Hassan Taftian	Iran	6.70	Q
7	1	Murtadha Al-Kemawee	Iraq	6.72	Q, NR
7	2	Deng Xinrui	China	6.72	Q
9	2	Favoris Muzrapov	Tajikistan	6.73	NR
10	2	Chan Yat Lok	Hong Kong	6.74	=NU20R
11	1	Liu Shuoyuan	China	6.77	
12	1	Vadivelu Kannadasan Elakkiya Dasan	India	6.79	
13	1	Kwok Chun Ting	Hong Kong	6.80	
14	1	Almat Tulebayev	Kazakhstan	6.81	
15	2	Chan Kin Wa	Macau	6.84	
16	2	Meshaal Al-Mutairi	Kuwait	6.87	

Final – 19 February

Rank	Lane	Name	Nationality	Time	Notes
1st place, gold medalist(s)	4	Ali Anwar Ali Al-Balushi	Oman	6.52	
2nd place, silver medalist(s)	3	Shuhei Tada	Japan	6.56	
3rd place, bronze medalist(s)	5	Jo Kum Ryong	North Korea	6.66	
4	6	Imranur Rahman	Bangladesh	6.67	
5	7	Tosin Ogunode	Qatar	6.69	
6	2	Hassan Taftian	Iran	6.69	
7	8	Deng Xinrui	China	6.74	
	1	Murtadha Al-Kemawee	Iraq	?	

=== 400 metres ===
Heats – 17 February

Rank	Heat	Name	Nationality	Time	Notes
1	1	Mohammad Jahir Rayhan	Bangladesh	48.84	Q, NR
2	1	Arash Sayyari	Iran	48.84	Q
3	1	Yasir Ali Al-Saadi	Iraq	49.02	q
4	2	Yefim Tarassov	Kazakhstan	49.34	Q
5	1	Mohamad Mortada	Lebanon	49.37	q
6	2	Sajjad Aghaei	Iran	49.38	Q
7	2	Abdul Mueed	Pakistan	50.47	
8	2	Bobojon Boboev	Tajikistan	52.71	
9	2	Lam Iok Hong	Macau	53.20	
	1	Dilshodbek Bobokulov	Uzbekistan	DNS	

Final – 18 February

Rank	Lane	Name	Nationality	Time	Notes
1st place, gold medalist(s)	3	Sajjad Aghaei	Iran	47.95	
2nd place, silver medalist(s)	6	Mohammad Jahir Rayhan	Bangladesh	48.10	NR
3rd place, bronze medalist(s)	1	Yasir Ali Al-Saadi	Iraq	48.40	
4	5	Yefim Tarassov	Kazakhstan	48.40	
5	2	Mohamad Mortada	Lebanon	49.16	
6	4	Arash Sayyari	Iran	49.61	

=== 800 metres ===
Heats – 18 February

Rank	Heat	Name	Nationality	Time	Notes
1	1	Sobhan Ahmadi	Iran	1:48.10	Q, NR
2	1	Abubaker Haydar Abdalla	Qatar	1:48.35	Q
3	2	Ebrahim Al-Zofairi	Kuwait	1:52.11	Q
4	2	Abdirahman Saeed Hassan	Qatar	1:52.15	Q
5	2	Ali Amirian	Iran	1:52.18	
6	1	Sami Masoud Al-Yami	Saudi Arabia	1:52.47	
7	1	Nooruldeen Adil Merzah	Iraq	1:53.23	
8	3	Mohammed Afsal Pulikkalakath	India	1:53.54	Q
9	3	Husain Mohsin Al-Farsi	Oman	1:53.73	Q
10	3	Omid Amirian	Iran	1:54.21	
11	2	Mohammed Al-Suleimani	Oman	1:54.71	
12	2	Abdulaziz Abdukayumov	Kazakhstan	1:56.79	
13	3	Pena Babaniyazov	Turkmenistan	1:57.54	
14	3	Mukumbek Maisalbek	Kyrgyzstan	1:57.61	

Final – 19 February

Rank	Name	Nationality	Time	Notes
1st place, gold medalist(s)	Ebrahim Al-Zofairi	Kuwait	1:46.80	CR, NR
2nd place, silver medalist(s)	Sobhan Ahmadi	Iran	1:47.04	NR
3rd place, bronze medalist(s)	Abubaker Haydar Abdalla	Qatar	1:47.74	
4	Abdirahman Saeed Hassan	Qatar	1:49.16	
5	Husain Mohsin Al-Farsi	Oman	1:52.99	
6	Mohammed Afsal Pulikkalakath	India	1:55.16	

=== 1500 metres ===
17 February

Rank	Name	Nationality	Time	Notes
1st place, gold medalist(s)	Nursultan Keneshbekov	Kyrgyzstan	3:49.10	NR
2nd place, silver medalist(s)	Abdirahman Saeed Hassan	Qatar	3:49.31	
3rd place, bronze medalist(s)	Ali Amirian	Iran	3:49.33	
4	Amir Farzam Safari	Iran	3:49.42	
5	Maxim Frolovskiy	Kazakhstan	3:52.14	
6	Ajay Kumar Saroj	India	3:52.56	
7	Fayez Abdullah Al-Subaie	Saudi Arabia	3:53.40	
8	Seyed Amir Zamanpour	Iran	3:53.52	
9	Samat Kazakbaev	Kyrgyzstan	4:00.10	
10	Mohammed Abdullah Mahal	Iraq	4:01.64	
	Najmuddin Zuhurshohi	Tajikistan	DNS	
	Ip Seng Tou	Macau	DNS	
	Pena Babaniyazov	Turkmenistan	DNS	

=== 3000 metres ===
19 February

Rank	Name	Nationality	Time	Notes
1st place, gold medalist(s)	Nursultan Keneshbekov	Kyrgyzstan	8:08.85	
2nd place, silver medalist(s)	Seyed Amir Zamanpour	Iran	8:09.58	
3rd place, bronze medalist(s)	Maxim Frolovskiy	Kazakhstan	8:17.17	
4	Yaser Salem Bagharab	Qatar	8:17.94	
5	Shunsuke Yoshii	Japan	8:20.34	
6	Samat Kazakbaev	Kyrgyzstan	8:38.36	
7	Mohammed Abdullah Mahal	Iraq	8:42.05	
8	Hossein Nouri	Iran	8:50.76	
9	Sohail Amir	Pakistan	8:57.27	
10	Najmuddin Zuhurshohi	Tajikistan	9:01.56	
11	Esmat Ahmadi	Afghanistan	9:58.12	
	Gulveer Singh	India	DQ	
	Jalil Naseri	Iran	DQ	
	Ip Seng Tou	Macau	DNS	

=== 60 metres hurdles ===
Heats – 17 February

Rank	Heat	Name	Nationality	Time	Notes
1	1	David Yefremov	Kazakhstan	7.66	Q
2	1	John Cabang	Philippines	7.71	Q
3	3	Ning Xiaohan	China	7.72	Q
4	2	Qin Weibo	China	7.73	Q
5	2	Tejas Shirse	India	7.75	Q
6	3	Salih Kadhim Naser	Iraq	7.82	Q
7	2	Kim Gyeong-tae	South Korea	7.84	q
8	1	Cheung Wang Fung	Hong Kong	7.85	q
9	3	Cheung Siu Hang	Hong Kong	7.88	
10	2	Masoud Karman	Iran	7.89	
11	3	Ergash Normurodov	Uzbekistan	7.90	
12	3	Ali Salamatian	Iran	7.92	
13	1	Ang Chen Xiang	Singapore	8.01	
14	1	Amirhosein Azizi	Iran	8.13	
15	2	Baqer Ali Al-Jumah	Saudi Arabia	8.21	
15	3	Saeed Othman Al-Absi	Qatar	8.21	

Final – 17 February

Rank	Lane	Name	Nationality	Time	Notes
1st place, gold medalist(s)	3	David Yefremov	Kazakhstan	7.60	=CR
2nd place, silver medalist(s)	4	Qin Weibo	China	7.63	
3rd place, bronze medalist(s)	6	John Cabang	Philippines	7.64	
4	5	Ning Xiaohan	China	7.70	
5	7	Tejas Shirse	India	7.70	
6	1	Kim Gyeong-tae	South Korea	7.84	
7	8	Cheung Wang Fung	Hong Kong	8.12	
	2	Salih Kadhim Naser	Iraq	DQ	

=== 4 × 400 metres relay ===
19 February

Rank	Nation	Athletes	Time	Notes
1st place, gold medalist(s)	Kazakhstan	Andrey Sokolov, Elnur Mukhitdinov, Vyacheslav Zems, Yefim Tarassov	3:12.05	
2nd place, silver medalist(s)	Iraq	Taha Hussein Yaseen, Ihab Jabbar Hashim, Mohammed Abdulridha al-Tameemi, Yasir Ali al-Saadi	3:12.09	NR
3rd place, bronze medalist(s)	Iran	Arash Sayyari, Mir Mohammad Taleei, Mohammad Sajjad Aghaei, Ali Amirian	3:13.96	

=== High jump ===
19 February

Rank	Name	Nationality	1.95	2.05	2.10	2.15	2.19	2.23	Result	Notes
1st place, gold medalist(s)	Ryoichi Akamatsu	Japan	–	–	–	o	o	xxx	2.19	
2nd place, silver medalist(s)	Yuto Seko	Japan	–	–	–	xo	o	xxx	2.19	
3rd place, bronze medalist(s)	Mahfuzur Rahman	Bangladesh	–	xxo	o	xxxo	xxx		2.15	NR
4	Ma Jia	China	–	o	xxo	xxo	xxx		2.15	
5	Keivan Ghanbarzadeh	Iran	–	xo	o	xxx			2.10	
6	Sharoz Khan	Pakistan	xo	xo	xxx				2.05	
7	Zelimkhan Nassyrov	Kazakhstan	o	xxo	xxx				2.05	
7	Mehdi Khodadadi	Iran	–	xxo	xxx				2.05	
9	Mohammad Mehdi Karimzadeh	Iran	o	xxx					1.95	
9	Ng Chi Kit	Macau	o	xxx					1.95	

=== Pole vault ===
18 February

Rank	Name	Nationality	4.60	4.80	5.00	5.15	5.25	5.35	5.45	5.50	5.55	5.60	5.65	5.70	Result	Notes
1st place, gold medalist(s)	Zhong Tao	China	–	–	–	–	xo	–	o	–	x–	o	xo	xxx	5.65	
2nd place, silver medalist(s)	Song Haoyang	China	–	–	–	–	o	–	o	–	x–	xo	xxx		5.60	
3rd place, bronze medalist(s)	Hussain Asim Al-Hizam	Saudi Arabia	–	–	–	–	o	xo	x–	o	o	x–	xx		5.55	
4	Seifeldin Mohamed Abdelsalam	Qatar	–	–	–	o	–	o	o	o	xxo	xx–	x		5.55	NR
5	Patsapong Amsam-ang	Thailand	–	–	–	–	o	xo	xo	–	xxx				5.45	NR
6	Shingo Sawa	Japan	–	o	o	xxo	xxo	xxx							5.25	
7	Danil Polyanskiy	Kazakhstan	–	xo	xo	xxo	xxx								5.15	
8	Hossein Fallah	Iran	o	o	xxx										4.80	
8	Mohammad Mehdi Motamednia	Iran	–	o	xxx										4.80	
8	Vladislav Garbuznyak	Kazakhstan	o	o	xxx										4.80	
8	Amir Arshia Mosaddeghi	Iran	–	o	xxx										4.80	
12	Ameer Sabeeh Saihood	Iraq	–	xxo	xxx										4.80	

=== Long jump ===
17 February

Rank	Name	Nationality	#1	#2	#3	#4	#5	#6	Result	Notes
1st place, gold medalist(s)	Zhang Mingkun	China	x	x	7.61	x	7.97	x	7.97	
2nd place, silver medalist(s)	Yuto Toriumi	Japan	7.39	x	7.72	7.61	7.89	x	7.89	
3rd place, bronze medalist(s)	Daiki Oda	Japan	7.67	7.76	6.07	7.45	7.58	7.75	7.76	
4	Shi Yuhao	China	7.48	x	7.75	7.72	7.63	x	7.75	
5	Janry Ubas	Philippines	7.13	7.58	7.30	7.22	7.60	7.29	7.60	
6	Chan Ming Tai	Hong Kong	7.41	7.46	x	x	x	7.40	7.46	
7	Ko Ho Long	Hong Kong	7.05	7.36	x	x	7.34	7.46	7.46	
8	Mehdi Tamari	Iran	7.22	7.18	7.40	7.09	6.94	7.14	7.40	
9	Mohammad Amin Ghareh	Iran	x	7.34	7.24				7.34	
10	Ildar Akhmadiev	Tajikistan	x	x	7.22				7.22	
11	Mohammadreza Firouzkouhi	Iran	x	x	7.13				7.13	
12	Ho Chon Lam	Macau	x	x	6.03				6.03	
	Hamoud Ali Olwani	Saudi Arabia							DNS	

=== Triple jump ===
19 February

Rank	Name	Nationality	#1	#2	#3	#4	#5	#6	Result	Notes
1st place, gold medalist(s)	Su Wen	China	x	16.74	x	x	–	–	16.74	
2nd place, silver medalist(s)	Kim Jang-woo	South Korea	15.71	16.33	16.34	x	16.37	x	16.37	
3rd place, bronze medalist(s)	Ivan Denisov	Uzbekistan	15.85	16.18	15.11	15.42	x	x	16.18	
4	Hikaru Ikehata	Japan	15.88	x	x	x	x	15.22	15.88	
5	Hamidreza Kia	Iran	15.48	15.74	15.36	x	x	15.67	15.74	
6	Yu Gyu-min	South Korea	15.64	x	15.02	x	15.56	x	15.64	
7	Mojtaba Zahedi	Iran	x	15.13	14.78	15.58	15.42	15.39	15.58	
8	Wu Ruiting	China	14.11	15.25	15.54				15.54	
9	Vahid Sedigh	Iran	x	14.60	x				14.60	

=== Shot put ===
17 February

Rank	Name	Nationality	#1	#2	#3	#4	#5	#6	Result	Notes
1st place, gold medalist(s)	Tajinderpal Singh Toor	India	x	19.72	x	19.27	x	x	19.72	NR
2nd place, silver medalist(s)	Ivan Ivanov	Kazakhstan	17.61	17.71	19.08	19.04	18.77	18.29	19.08	
3rd place, bronze medalist(s)	Mehdi Saberi	Iran	18.74	x	x	x	18.64	x	18.74	
4	Dhanveer Singh	India	18.04	18.35	17.96	17.68	18.14	18.59	18.59	
5	Mohammadreza Tayebi	Iran	17.87	18.47	x	18.34	18.41	18.49	18.49	
6	Hossein Rouzgar	Iran	17.47	17.76	17.69	18.14	17.85	17.68	18.14	
	Mohamed Daouda Tolo	Saudi Arabia							DNS	

=== Heptathlon ===
18–19 February

The highest mark recorded in each event is highlighted in yellow

Rank	Athlete	Nationality	60m	LJ	SP	HJ	60m H	PV	1000m	Points	Notes
1st place, gold medalist(s)	Yuma Maruyama	Japan	7.06	7.29	14.46	1.90	8.14	4.70	2:48.07	5767	
2nd place, silver medalist(s)	Zakhriddin Shokirov	Uzbekistan	7.23	7.17	12.64	1.96	8.76	4.70	2:59.84	5353	
3rd place, bronze medalist(s)	Amir Mahdi Hanifeh	Iran	7.17	6.51	11.77	1.90	8.40	4.50	3:01.36	5124	
4	Samandar Makhmudov	Uzbekistan	7.30	6.88	11.84	1.99	8.48	4.00	3:00.72	5094	
5	Essa Abdullah Jarah	Saudi Arabia	7.09	6.88	10.64	1.81	8.17	4.10	3:00.93	5035	
6	Mohsen Hassan Dabbous	Saudi Arabia	7.08	6.48	11.35	1.78	8.41	4.40	3:17.86	4836	
7	Pouyan Shokri	Iran	7.28	6.77	12.42	1.81	8.77	4.00	3:15.50	4747	
8	Erfan Mahmoudi	Iran	7.21	6.80	11.07	1.93	8.41	3.70	3:27.26	4704	
	Majed Radhi Al-Sayed	Kuwait	7.46	6.72	11.88	1.84	8.81	4.30	DNS	DNF	
	Abdullah Al-Ameer	Kuwait	7.17	6.42	9.84	1.60	9.50	4.10	DNS	DNF	
	Abdul Sajjad Saadoun Nasser	Iraq	7.50	6.80	11.46	DNS	–	–	–	DNF	
	Najib Mohammad Poor	Afghanistan	7.71	5.47	DNS	–	–	–	–	DNF	

== Women's results ==
=== 60 metres ===
Heats – 18 February

Rank	Heat	Name	Nationality	Time	Notes
1	2	Farzaneh Fasihi	Iran	7.31	Q
2	2	Olga Safronova	Kazakhstan	7.40	Q
3	3	Hamideh Esmaeilnejad	Iran	7.43	Q
4	3	Valentina Meredova	Turkmenistan	7.46	Q, =NR
5	3	Chan Pui Kei	Hong Kong	7.46	q
6	1	Supanich Poolkerd	Thailand	7.47	Q
7	2	Xu Jialu	China	7.49	q
8	3	Mudhawi Al-Shammari	Kuwait	7.54	
9	3	Margarita Nazarenko	Kazakhstan	7.57	
10	2	Dana Hussain	Iraq	7.58	
11	1	Huang Ziting	China	7.63	Q
12	1	Faezeh Ashourpour	Iran	7.68	
13	1	Shirin Akter	Bangladesh	7.86	NR
14	2	Enejan Esedova	Turkmenistan	8.06	
15	3	Cheong Ka Ian	Macau	8.08	
16	1	Lujain Mahmoud Hamdan	Saudi Arabia	8.20	
	2	Hiba Mohammad Mallam	Saudi Arabia	DQ	

Final – 18 February

Rank	Lane	Name	Nationality	Time	Notes
1st place, gold medalist(s)	6	Farzaneh Fasihi	Iran	7.20	=CR, NR
2nd place, silver medalist(s)	3	Olga Safronova	Kazakhstan	7.35	
3rd place, bronze medalist(s)	5	Supanich Poolkerd	Thailand	7.38	
4	1	Xu Jialu	China	7.39	
5	4	Hamideh Esmaeilnejad	Iran	7.41	
6	2	Valentina Meredova	Turkmenistan	7.44	NR
7	8	Chan Pui Kei	Hong Kong	7.44	NR
8	7	Huang Ziting	China	7.50	

=== 400 metres ===
Heats – 17 February

Rank	Heat	Name	Nationality	Time	Notes
1	2	Nanako Matsumoto	Japan	55.56	Q
2	1	Kazhan Rostami	Iran	55.95	Q
3	2	Nazanin Fatemeh	Iran	56.47	Q
4	1	Shahla Mahmoudi	Iran	56.56	Q
5	1	Haruna Kuboyama	Japan	56.78	q
6	2	Laylo Allaberganova	Uzbekistan	57.48	q
7	1	Anna Shumilo	Kazakhstan	58.32	
7	2	Mariya Shuvalova	Kazakhstan	58.32	
	1	Malika Radjabova	Uzbekistan	DNS	

Final – 18 February

Rank	Lane	Name	Nationality	Time	Notes
1st place, gold medalist(s)	6	Nanako Matsumoto	Japan	55.14	
2nd place, silver medalist(s)	4	Nazanin Fatemeh	Iran	55.33	
3rd place, bronze medalist(s)	5	Kazhan Rostami	Iran	55.35	
4	1	Haruna Kuboyama	Japan	56.28	
5	2	Laylo Allaberganova	Uzbekistan	56.33	
6	3	Shahla Mahmoudi	Iran	56.41	

=== 800 metres ===
19 February

Rank	Name	Nationality	Time	Notes
1st place, gold medalist(s)	Toktam Dastarbandan	Iran	2:09.17	NR
2nd place, silver medalist(s)	Negin Azari Edalat	Iran	2:11.43	
3rd place, bronze medalist(s)	Akbayan Nurmamet	Kazakhstan	2:13.10	
4	Amal Al-Roumi	Kuwait	2:13.24	
5	Maryam Ahmadi	Iran	2:19.72	
6	Fasuhaa Ahmed	Maldives	2:22.30	NR
7	Fateme Heidari	Afghanistan	2:52.20	

=== 1500 metres ===
17 February

Rank	Name	Nationality	Time	Notes
1st place, gold medalist(s)	Harmilan Bains	India	4:29.55	
2nd place, silver medalist(s)	Ainuska Kalil Kyzy	Kyrgyzstan	4:35.29	
3rd place, bronze medalist(s)	Aiana Bolatbekkyzy	Kazakhstan	4:37.20	
4	Parichehr Shahi	Iran	4:42.10	
5	Samira Khodatars	Iran	4:44.32	
6	Akbayan Nurmamet	Kazakhstan	4:45.01	
7	Boshra Ramouz	Iran	4:52.58	
	Shokhsanam Khurramova	Uzbekistan	DNS	

=== 3000 metres ===
19 February

Rank	Name	Nationality	Time	Notes
1st place, gold medalist(s)	Yuma Yamamoto	Japan	9:16.71	
2nd place, silver medalist(s)	Ankita	India	9:26.22	
3rd place, bronze medalist(s)	Ainuska Kalil Kyzy	Kyrgyzstan	9:27.18	
4	Mariia Korobitskaia	Kyrgyzstan	9:39.81	
5	Parisa Arab	Iran	9:47.92	
6	Parichehr Shahi	Iran	10:31.76	
7	Aiana Bolatbekkyzy	Kazakhstan	10:59.65	
	Hadiseh Raouf	Iran	DNF	

=== 60 metres hurdles ===
Heats – 17 February

Rank	Heat	Name	Nationality	Time	Notes
1	2	Asuka Terada	Japan	8.18	Q
2	1	Jyothi Yarraji	India	8.22	Q
3	2	Lui Lai Yiu	Hong Kong	8.32	Q
4	1	Shing Cho Yan	Hong Kong	8.33	Q
5	2	Yuliya Bashmanova	Kazakhstan	8.34	Q
6	2	Wu Binbin	China	8.34	q
7	1	Lidiya Podsepkina	Uzbekistan	8.49	Q
8	1	Elnaz Kompani	Iran	8.50	q
9	2	Faezeh Ashourpour	Iran	8.57	
10	1	Sara Nadafi	Iran	8.77	
	2	Dlsoz Obed Najim	Iraq	DNS	

Final – 17 February

Rank	Lane	Name	Nationality	Time	Notes
1st place, gold medalist(s)	4	Jyothi Yarraji	India	8.12	NR
2nd place, silver medalist(s)	3	Asuka Terada	Japan	8.21	
3rd place, bronze medalist(s)	5	Lui Lai Yiu	Hong Kong	8.26	NR
4	2	Wu Binbin	China	8.32	
5	6	Shing Cho Yan	Hong Kong	8.35	
6	8	Yuliya Bashmanova	Kazakhstan	8.35	
7	1	Elnaz Kompani	Iran	8.42	
8	7	Lidiya Podsepkina	Uzbekistan	8.50	

=== 4 × 400 meters relay ===
19 February

Rank	Lane	Nation	Athletes	Time	Notes
1st place, gold medalist(s)	6	Kazakhstan	Adelina Zems, Anna Shumilo, Mariya Shuvalova, Kristina Kondrashova	3:41.08	
2nd place, silver medalist(s)	4	Iran	Kazhan Rostami, Shahla Mahmoudi, Maryam Mohebi, Nazanin Fatemeh	3:41.72	NR
3rd place, bronze medalist(s)	5	Uzbekistan	Laylo Allaberganova, Lidiya Podsepkina, Nurxon Ochilova, Ogiloy Norboyeva	4:12.43	

=== High jump ===
18 February

Rank	Name	Nationality	1.55	1.60	1.65	1.70	1.75	1.80	1.83	1.86	1.89	Result	Notes
1st place, gold medalist(s)	Yelizaveta Matveyeva	Kazakhstan	–	–	–	o	xo	o	o	xo	xxx	1.86	
2nd place, silver medalist(s)	Shao Yuqi	China	–	–	–	o	o	xo	o	xxo	xxx	1.86	
3rd place, bronze medalist(s)	Lu Jiawen	China	–	–	–	o	o	o	xo	xxx		1.83	
4	Barnokhon Sayfullleva	Uzbekistan	–	–	–	o	o	o	xxx			1.80	
5	Svetlana Radzivil	Uzbekistan	–	–	–	o	xo	xo	xxx			1.80	
6	Chung Wai Yan	Hong Kong	–	o	o	o	o	xxx				1.75	
6	Lai Yan Hei	Hong Kong	–	–	o	o	o	xxx				1.75	
8	Mahya Naeimi	Iran	o	o	o	xo	xxx					1.70	
9	Asal Ali Gholi	Iran	o	o	xo	xo	xxx					1.70	
10	Maedeh Motahari	Iran	xo	o	o	xxo	xxx					1.70	

=== Pole vault ===
19 February

Rank	Name	Nationality	3.20	3.40	3.60	3.80	4.00	4.10	4.20	4.30	4.36	4.41	4.46	4.51	4.61	Result	Notes
1st place, gold medalist(s)	Li Ling	China	–	–	–	–	–	–	o	–	xo	–	o	o	xxx	4.51	
2nd place, silver medalist(s)	Niu Chunge	China	–	–	–	–	–	–	o	o	–	xxo	–	xxx		4.41	
3rd place, bronze medalist(s)	Mahsa Mirzatabibi	Iran	–	–	o	o	xxo	o	xxx							4.10	
4	Polina Ivanova	Kazakhstan	–	–	o	o	xxx									3.80	
5	Baranica Elangovan	India	–	–	xo	o	xxx									3.80	
5	Chayanisa Chomchuendee	Thailand	–	–	o	xxx										3.60	
6	Samira Kordali	Iran	o	o	xxx											3.40	
7	Fatemeh Khodaei	Iran	xo	xxx												3.20	
	Anastasya Ibragimova	Kazakhstan	–	–	–	xxx										NM	

=== Long jump ===
17 February

Rank	Name	Nationality	#1	#2	#3	#4	#5	#6	Result	Notes
1st place, gold medalist(s)	Xiong Shiqi	China	6.44	6.38	6.43	6.38	6.37	6.55	6.55	
2nd place, silver medalist(s)	Tan Mengyi	China	5.89	6.28	x	6.42	6.50	6.48	6.50	
3rd place, bronze medalist(s)	Yue Nga Yan	Hong Kong	x	6.30	6.40	x	6.45	x	6.45	NR
4	Anastassiya Rypakova	Kazakhstan	6.07	6.11	6.20	6.22	6.35	x	6.35	
5	Shaili Singh	India	6.18	6.12	6.27	6.18	6.05	6.27	6.27	
6	Nayana James	India	6.23	6.14	6.22	x	6.16	x	6.23	
7	Reihaneh Mobini	Iran	5.92	x	5.70	6.04	6.16	6.01	6.16	NR
8	Elahe Rahimifar	Iran	5.95	x	6.09	x	x	x	6.09	
9	Alina Chistyakova	Kazakhstan	5.77	5.85	5.81				5.85	
10	Jia Wai Yin	Hong Kong	5.63	x	x				5.63	NU20R
11	Najmeh Khormali	Iran	5.39	5.07	4.83				5.39	

=== Triple jump ===
18 February

Rank	Name	Nationality	#1	#2	#3	#4	#5	#6	Result	Notes
1st place, gold medalist(s)	Chen Jie	China	x	13.63	x	x	x	x	13.63	
2nd place, silver medalist(s)	Zeng Rui	China	13.61	13.32	13.35	13.33	13.39	12.10	13.61	
3rd place, bronze medalist(s)	Mariya Yefremova	Kazakhstan	x	13.48	13.21	x	x	13.44	13.48	
4	Mariko Morimoto	Japan	x	13.15	13.23	x	x	13.37	13.37	
5	Maryam Kazemi	Iran	x	13.01	x	12.99	13.07	x	13.07	
6	Valeriya Safonova	Kazakhstan	x	12.73	x	12.59	x	12.86	12.86	
7	Vera Chan Shannon	Hong Kong	12.37	12.55	x	12.38	x	12.73	12.73	NR
8	Sarina Saedi	Iran	x	x	12.64	12.60	x	12.61	12.64	
9	Parinya Chuaimaroeng	Thailand	12.37	x	x				12.37	
10	Zahra Hefzi	Iran	11.58	x	11.73				11.73	

=== Shot put ===
17 February

Rank	Name	Nationality	#1	#2	#3	#4	#5	#6	Result	Notes
1st place, gold medalist(s)	Sun Yue	China	17.24	17.62	17.65	x	17.56	x	17.65	
2nd place, silver medalist(s)	Malika Nasriddinova	Uzbekistan	15.42	x	x	x	14.96	x	15.42	
3rd place, bronze medalist(s)	Elham Sadathashemi	Iran	13.14	13.40	x	14.27	14.20	13.85	14.27	
4	Melina Rezaei Malek	Iran	12.12	13.59	13.61	13.01	x	12.71	13.61	
5	Zahra Omidvar	Iran	13.34	x	x	13.06	13.29	12.86	13.34	

=== Pentathlon ===
19 February

The highest mark recorded in each event is highlighted in yellow

Rank	Athlete	Nationality	60m H	HJ	SP	LJ	800m	Points	Notes
1st place, gold medalist(s)	Zheng Ninali	China	8.36	1.77	12.67	5.82	2:34.28	4130	
2nd place, silver medalist(s)	Fatemeh Mohitizadeh	Iran	8.48	1.71	11.59	5.63	2:28.61	3970	
3rd place, bronze medalist(s)	Alina Chistyakova	Kazakhstan	8.87	1.65	10.54	5.83	2:27.78	3816	
4	Saba Khorasani	Iran	8.96	1.68	10.43	5.64	2:26.45	3785	
5	Elnaz Mousaei	Iran	9.31	1.50	10.58	5.42	2:33.86	3471	
6	Ugiloi Norbaeva	Uzbekistan	9.09	1.65	10.90	5.20	DNF	2889	
	Irina Konichsheva	Kazakhstan	10.97	1.65	10.29	NM	DNS	DNF	
	Kseniya Borusheva	Uzbekistan	DNS	–	–	–	–	DNS	
