= Bangladesh at the 2023 World Athletics Championships =

- Flag of Bangladesh
- WA code: BAN

in Budapest, Hungary 19 August 2023 – 27 August 2023
- Competitors: 1 (1 man and 0 women)
- Medals: Gold 0 Silver 0 Bronze 0 Total 0

World Athletics Championships appearances
- 1991; 1993; 1995; 1997; 1999–2001; 2003; 2005; 2007; 2009; 2011; 2013; 2015; 2017; 2019; 2022; 2023; 2025

Bangladesh competed at the 2023 World Athletics Championships in Budapest, Hungary, which were held from 19 to 27 August 2023. The athlete delegation of the country was composed of one competitor, sprinter Imranur Rahman who competed in the men's 100 metres. He qualified for the Championships upon being selected by the Bangladesh Athletics Federation. In the preliminary round heats, he placed first in his heat and qualified for the first round heats. In the first round heats, he placed seventh and failed to advance further.

== Background ==
The 2023 World Athletics Championships in Budapest, Hungary, were held from 19 to 27 August 2023. The Championships were held at the National Athletics Centre. To qualify for the World Championships, athletes had to reach an entry standard (e.g. time or distance), place in a specific position at select competitions, be a wild card entry, or qualify through their World Athletics Ranking at the end of the qualification period.

As Bangladesh did not meet any of the four standards, they could send either one male or one female athlete in one event of the Championships who has not yet qualified. The Bangladesh Athletics Federation selected sprinter Imranur Rahman, who would compete in the men's 100 metres. In the entry list for the Championships, he held a personal and season's best of 10.25 seconds in the event and held a World Athletics Ranking of 138th.

== Results ==
Key

- Q = Qualified for the next round
- q = Qualified for the next round as a fastest loser or, in field events, by position without achieving the qualifying target
- NR = National record
- PB = Personal best
- SB = Season best
- N/A = Round not applicable for the event

=== Men ===
Rahman first competed in the third preliminary round heat on 19 August against seven other sprinters. There, he recorded a time of 10.50 seconds and placed first in his heat, qualifying for the first round heats. He then competed in the sixth heat of the first round heats held on the same day against seven other sprinters. There, he recorded a time of 10.41 and placed seventh, failing to advance further as he was not within the top three of his heat nor was he one of the three next fastest.

Track and road events

Athlete	Event	Preliminary		Heat		Semifinal		Final	
Athlete	Event	Result	Rank	Result	Rank	Result	Rank	Result	Rank
Imranur Rahman	100 metres	10.50	1 Q	10.41	7	Did not advance			
