= Bangladesh at the 2022 World Athletics Championships =

- Flag of Bangladesh
- WA code: BAN
- National federation: Bangladesh Athletics Federation

in Eugene, United States 15–24 July 2022
- Competitors: 1 (1 man)
- Medals: Gold 0 Silver 0 Bronze 0 Total 0

World Athletics Championships appearances
- 1991; 1993; 1995; 1997; 1999–2001; 2003; 2005; 2007; 2009; 2011; 2013; 2015; 2017; 2019; 2022; 2023; 2025

Bangladesh competed at the 2022 World Athletics Championships in Eugene, United States, from 15 to 24 July 2022. Bangladesh entered 1 athlete.

== Entrants ==
- including alternates

Track and road events

Athlete	Event	Preliminary round		Heat		Semi-final		Final	
Athlete	Event	Result	Rank	Result	Rank	Result	Rank	Result	Rank
Imranur Rahman	Men's 100 metres	10.47 (−0.1)	4 q	DNS		Did not advance			
