= Bangladesh at the 2017 World Championships in Athletics =

- WA code: BAN

in London, England
- Competitors: 1
- Medals: Gold 0 Silver 0 Bronze 0 Total 0

World Championships in Athletics appearances
- 1991; 1993; 1995; 1997; 1999–2001; 2003; 2005; 2007; 2009; 2011; 2013; 2015; 2017; 2019; 2022; 2023; 2025

Bangladesh competed at the 2017 World Championships in Athletics in London, England, 4–13 August 2017.

== Results ==
(q = qualified, NM = no mark, SB = season best)

=== Men ===
Track and road events

Athlete	Event	Preliminary Round		Heat		Semi-final		Final	
Athlete	Event	Result	Rank	Result	Rank	Result	Rank	Result	Rank
Masbah Ahmmed	100 metres	11.08	19	Did not advance					
