= Pavithra =

Pavithra may refer to:

- Pavithra (film) 1994 Indian Tamil-language drama film
- Pavithra Lakshmi, Indian actress
- Pavitra Lokesh, Indian film and television actress
- Pavithra Janani, Indian television actress
- Pavithra Vengatesh, Indian athlete
- Pavithra Wanniarachchi, Sri Lankan lawyer and politician

== See also ==
- Pavitra (disambiguation)
