= 2023 Asian Indoor Athletics Championships =

2023 Asian Indoor Championships
- Dates: 10–12 February
- Host city: Astana, Kazakhstan
- Venue: Kazakhstan Sports Palace
- Events: 26
- Participation: 282 athletes from 30 nations
- Records set: 3 CR

The 2023 Asian Indoor Athletics Championships was the tenth edition of the international indoor athletics event among Asian nations. It took place at the Kazakhstan Sports Palace in Astana, the first ever edition in Kazakhstan, from 10 to 12 February.

== Results ==
=== Men ===
Event	Gold		Silver		Bronze	
60 metres	Imranur Rahman (BAN)	6.59 NR	Shak Kam Ching (HKG)	6.65 NR	Ryota Suzuki (JPN)	6.66 PB
400 metres	Ammar Ismail Yahia Ibrahim (QAT)	46.25 PB	Mikhail Litvin (KAZ)	46.39 SB	Fan Tianrui (CHN)	47.30
800 metres	Ebrahim Al-Zofairi (KUW)	1:49.33 PB	Abdirahman Saeed Hassan (QAT)	1:49.58	Musaab Abdelrahman Bala (QAT)	1:49.68
1500 metres	Kazuto Iizawa (JPN)	3:42.83 SB	Mohamad Al-Garni (QAT)	3:43.39	Adam Ali Musab (QAT)	3:43.42
3000 metres	Mohamad Al-Garni (QAT)	7:55.25	Keita Satoh (JPN)	7:56.41	Shadrack Kimutai Koech (KAZ)	7:59.84
60 metres hurdles	David Yefremov (KAZ)	7.65	Chen Kuei-Ru (TPE)	7.68 SB	Shuhei Ishikawa (JPN)	7.70
4 × 400 m relay	Kazakhstan; Andrey Sokolov; Elnur Mukhitdinov; Vyacheslav Zems; Mikhail Litvin	3:09.15 NR	Qatar; Hussain Ibrahim; Ismail Abakar; Femi Ogunode; Ammar Ibrahim	3:09.26	Tajikistan; Leonid Pronzhenko; Mirsaid Mirzozoda; Mukhammadrizo Mirzozoda; Aleksandr Pronzhenko	3:34.45 NR
High jump	Ryoichi Akamatsu (JPN)	2.28 PB	Woo Sang-hyeok (KOR)	2.24 SB	Majd Eddin Ghazal (SYR)	2.24 SB
Pole vault	Hussain Asim Al-Hizam (KSA)	5.45	Seif Heneida (QAT)	5.35 NR	Patsapong Amsam-ang (THA)	5.35 NR
Long jump	Lin Yu-tang (TPE)	8.02 NR	Jeswin Aldrin (IND)	7.97 NR	Zhang Mingkun (CHN)	7.92 PB
Triple jump	Fang Yaoqing (CHN)	17.20 PB, CR	Praveen Chithravel (IND)	16.98 NR	Yu Kyu-min (KOR)	16.73 PB
Shot put	Tajinderpal Singh Toor (IND)	19.49 PB	Karanveer Singh (IND)	19.37 PB	Chen Xiaodong (CHN)	18.85 PB
Heptathlon	Yuma Maruyama (JPN)	5801 PB	Keisuke Okuda (JPN)	5497 PB	Janry Ubas (PHI)	5306 NR

=== Women ===
Event	Gold		Silver		Bronze	
60 metres	Farzaneh Fasihi (IRI)	7.28	Olga Safronova (KAZ)	7.32	Valentin Vanesa Lonteng (INA)	7.37
400 metres	Elina Mikhina (KAZ)	54.07	Nguyễn Thị Huyền (VIE)	54.68	Sri Maya Sari (INA)	54.88 NR
800 metres	Wu Hongjiao (CHN)	2:06.85	Ayano Shiomi (JPN)	2:07.18	Xinyu Rao (CHN)	2:08.75
1500 metres	Nguyễn Thị Oanh (VIE)	4:15.55 NR	Yume Goto (JPN)	4:19.29	Akbayan Nurmamet (KAZ)	4:21.31
3000 metres	Caroline Chepkoech Kipkirui (KAZ)	9:01.98	He Wuga (CHN)	9:03.43	Yuma Yamamoto (JPN)	9:09.29
60 metres hurdles	Masumi Aoki (JPN)	8.01 CR, NR	Jyothi Yarraji (IND)	8.13 NR	Chen Jiamin (CHN)	8.15
4 × 400 m relay	Kazakhstan; Adelina Zems; Aleksandra Zalyubovskaya; Kristina Kondrashova; Elina Mikhina	3:44.21	Uzbekistan; Laylo Allaberganova; Kamila Mirsolieva; Malika Radzhabova; Farida Soliyeva	3:46.45 NR	Not awarded	
High jump	Nadezhda Dubovitskaya (KAZ)	1.89	Kristina Ovchinnikova (KAZ)	1.89	Yelizaveta Matveyeva (KAZ)	1.84
Pole vault	Mayu Nasu (JPN)	4.00	Pavithra Vengatesh (IND)	4.00	Rosy Meena Paulraj (IND)	3.90
Long jump	Sumire Hata (JPN)	6.64 CR, NR	Huang Yingying (CHN)	6.43	Darya Reznichenko (UZB)	6.37
Triple jump	Sharifa Davronova (UZB)	13.98	Mariko Morimoto (JPN)	13.66 NR	Chen Ting (CHN)	13.52
Shot put	Jeong Yu-sun (KOR)	16.98	Lee Soo-jung (KOR)	16.45	Eki Febri Ekawati (INA)	15.44 NR
Pentathlon	Ekaterina Voronina (UZB)	4386 NR	Swapna Barman (IND)	4119 NR	Yuki Yamasaki (JPN)	4078 NR

== Medal table ==
* Host nation (Host nation)

Rank	Nation	Gold	Silver	Bronze	Total
1	Japan	6	5	4	15
2	Kazakhstan*	6	3	3	12
3	Qatar	2	4	2	8
4	China	2	2	6	10
5	Uzbekistan	2	1	1	4
6	India	1	6	1	8
7	South Korea	1	2	1	4
8	Chinese Taipei	1	1	0	2
8	Vietnam	1	1	0	2
10	Bangladesh	1	0	0	1
10	Iran	1	0	0	1
10	Kuwait	1	0	0	1
10	Saudi Arabia	1	0	0	1
14	Hong Kong	0	1	0	1
15	Indonesia	0	0	3	3
16	Philippines	0	0	1	1
16	Syria	0	0	1	1
16	Tajikistan	0	0	1	1
16	Thailand	0	0	1	1
Totals (19 entries)		26	26	25	77

== Participating nations ==
- Afghanistan (1)
- Bangladesh (2)
- China (24)
- Chinese Taipei (4)
- Hong Kong (12)
- India (25)
- Indonesia (4)
- Iran (8)
- Iraq (7)
- Japan (27)
- Kazakhstan (65)
- Kuwait (13)
- Kyrgyzstan (8)
- Laos (1)
- Lebanon (3)
- Macau (2)
- Maldives (2)
- Oman (2)
- Pakistan (5)
- Philippines (6)
- Qatar (10)
- Saudi Arabia (6)
- South Korea (8)
- Singapore (3)
- Syria (1)
- Tajikistan (6)
- Thailand (3)
- Turkmenistan (5)
- Uzbekistan (15)
- Vietnam (4)
