= List of Hong Kong records in athletics =

The following are the national records in athletics in Hong Kong, maintained by Hong Kong Amateur Athletic Association (HKAAA).

== Outdoor ==
Key to tables: Awaiting ratification Record not kept by HKAAA Not ratified or later rescinded by HKAAA

=== Men ===
| Event | Record | Athlete | Date | Meet | Place | Ref. |
|---|---|---|---|---|---|---|
| 100 m | 10.27 (+0.8 m/s) | Yip King Wai | 16 November 2025 | National Games of China | Guangzhou, China | |
| 200 m | 20.66 (+1.7 m/s) | Yip King Wai | 9 May 2026 | Hong Kong Championships | Wan Chai, Hong Kong | |
| 400 m | 47.09 | Chan Chun Ho | 17 November 2025 | National Games of China | Guangzhou, China | |
| 400 m | 46.91 | Chan Chun Ho | 14 June 2026 | Hong Kong Open | Hong Kong, Hong Kong | |
| 800 m | 1:50.12 | Khan Mohammad Kamran | 30 May 2025 | Asian Championships | Gumi, South Korea | |
| 1500 m | 3:52.67 | Khan Mohammad Kamran | 17 November 2025 | National Games of China | Guangzhou, China | |
| Mile | 4:20.49 | Chow Hon Nip Hanniel | 15 February 2020 | Pomona-Pitzer Collegiate All Comers | Claremont, United States | |
| 3000 m | 8:29.15 | Wesley Chan Wai Chung | 14 July 2024 | 230th Tokai Distance Challenge | Hiratsuka, Japan | |
| 5000 m | 14:35.37 | Wesley Chan Wai Chung | 30 November 2024 | 13th Nittaidai Challenge Games | Yokohama, Japan | |
| 10,000 m | 30:00.65 | Tse Chun Yin | 1 December 2024 | 13th Nittaidai Challenge Games | Yokohama, Japan | |
| 10 km (road) | 29:27 | Wong Wan Chun | 3 July 2022 | Southern Cross University 10k | Gold Coast, Australia | |
| 15 km (road) | 46:55+ | Wong Wan Chun | 17 October 2020 | World Half Marathon Championships | Gdynia, Poland | |
| 15 km (road) | 46:20+ | Wong Wan Chun | 24 September 2023 | Berlin Marathon | Berlin, Germany | |
| 15 km (road) | 45:40+ | Wong Wan Chun | 20 November 2022 | Ageo City Half-Marathon | Ageo, Japan | |
| 15 km (road) | 45:32+ | Wong Wan Chun | 17 November 2024 | Ageo City Half-Marathon | Ageo, Japan | |
| 20 km (road) | 1:02:26+ | Wong Wan Chun | 24 September 2023 | Berlin Marathon | Berlin, Germany | |
| Half marathon | 1:04:30 | Wong Wan Chun | 20 November 2022 | Ageo City Half-Marathon | Ageo, Japan | |
| 25 km (road) | 1:18:42+ | Wong Wan Chun | 24 September 2023 | Berlin Marathon | Berlin, Germany | |
| 30 km (road) | 1:35:06+ | Wong Wan Chun | 24 September 2023 | Berlin Marathon | Berlin, Germany | |
| Marathon | 2:15:26 | Wong Wan Chun | 15 December 2024 | Fuzhou Marathon | Fuzhou, China | |
| 110 m hurdles | 13.69 (+1.6 m/s) | Cheung Wang Fung | 19 November 2025 | National Games of China | Guangzhou, China | |
| 400 m hurdles | 50.88 | Chan Ka Chun | 16 April 2016 | Mt. SAC Relays | Norwalk, United States | |
| 3000 m steeplechase | 9:12.21 | Yeung Jason Chun Ho | 7 February 2026 | Hong Kong Athletics Series - Series 1 cum Race Walking | Hong Kong, Hong Kong | |
| High jump | 2.16 m | Chang Yu Ho | 23 March 1997 | | Shaoxing, China | |
| High jump | 2.23 m (Note: recognised by World Athletics) | Mark Chenn | 11 April 1998 | Provo Cougar Invitationa | Provo, United States | |
| High jump | 2.25 m (Note: as a US citizen) | Mark Chenn | 20 May 2000 | Provo Mountain West Conference Championship | Provo, United States | |
| Pole vault | 5.00 m | Cheung Pui-yin | 8 October 2022 | Hong Kong Athletics Series - Series 4 | Hong Kong, Hong Kong | |
| Long jump | 8.12 m (+0.4 m/s) | Chan Ming Tai | 7 May 2016 | Hong Kong Athletics Championships | Hong Kong, Hong Kong | |
| Triple jump | 15.76 m (+1.1 m/s) | Ng Ka Wai | 7 April 2013 | Hong Kong Athletics League 2013- R2 | Hong Kong, Hong Kong | |
| Shot put | 15.70 m | Chiu Lap San | 12 December 2010 | Hong Kong Open Athletics Meet | Hong Kong, Hong Kong | |
| Discus throw | 48.58 m (Note: ratified by federation but not recognised by World Athletics) | Arthur McKenzie | 19 March 1978 | | Hong Kong, Hong Kong | |
| Discus throw | 48.58 m (Note: recognised by World Athletics) | Siu Kai Wing | 10 May 2025 | Hong Kong Championships | Hong Kong | |
| Hammer throw | 65.14 m | Lam Wai | 15 May 2015 | Chinese Taipei Open Athletics Open Invitational Meet | Taipei, Taiwan | |
| Javelin throw | 71.78 m | Ricky Hui | 27 August 2018 | Asian Games | Jakarta, Indonesia | |
| Decathlon | 6537 pts | Leung Shing Hei | 9–10 May 2026 | Hong Kong Championships | Wan Chai, Hong Kong | |
| Decathlon | 100m (wind) / Long jump (wind) / Shot put / High jump / 400m / 110m H (wind) / Discus / Pole vault / Javelin / 1500m; 11.07 / 6.69 m / 11.45 m / 1.72 m / 51.15 / 15.05 / 37.25 m / 3.40 m / 45.35 m / 4:48.63 | | | | | |
| 3000 m walk (track) | 13:03.72 | Chin Man Kit | 30 November 2025 | 29th Hiroshima Ken-ou walking race | Higashihiroshima, Japan | |
| 5000 m walk (track) | 21:50.23 | Chin Man Kit | 14 December 2025 | Hong Kong Junior Age Group Championships cum Challenge | Hong Kong, Hong Kong | |
| 5 km walk (road) | 22:36+ | Tse Chun Hung | 15 March 2015 | Asian Race Walking Championships | Nomi, Japan | |
| 10,000 m walk (track) | 44:48.71 | Chin Man Kit | 30 November 2025 | 29th Hiroshima Ken-ou walking race | Higashihiroshima, Japan | |
| 10 km walk (road) | 43:58+ | Chin Man Kit | 19 March 2023 | Asian Race Walking Championships | Nomi, Japan | |
| 15 km walk (road) | 1:06:20+ | Tse Chun Hung | 19 March 2023 | Asian Race Walking Championships | Nomi, Japan | |
| 20 km walk (road) | 1:27:35 | Chin Man Kit | 1 January 2026 | New Year Race Walk | Tokyo, Japan | |
| 30 km walk (road) | 2:20:56+ (Note: Split time recorded at the distance of 30.195 km) | Chin Man Kit | 25 October 2026 | All Japan Race Walking competition Takahata | Takahata, Japan | |
| 35 km walk (road) | 2:45:08+ (Note: Split time recorded at the distance of 35.195 km) | Chin Man Kit | 25 October 2026 | All Japan Race Walking competition Takahata | Takahata, Japan | |
| Marathon walk (road) | 3:20:34 | Chin Man Kit | 25 October 2026 | All Japan Race Walking competition Takahata | Takahata, Japan | |
| 50 km walk (road) | 4:39:15 | Tse Chun Hung | 1 January 2020 | The First Walk 2020 | Hong Kong, Hong Kong | |
| 4 × 100 m relay | 38.47 | Hong Kong; Tang Yik Chun; Lai Chun Ho; Ng Ka Fung; Tsui Chi Ho | 26 May 2012 | Chinese Taipei Open Athletics Championship | Taipei, Taiwan | |
| 4 × 200 m relay | 1:23.11 | Hong Kong; Chan Yat Lok; Yip King Wai; Leung Ching Hang Wesley; Johannsson Magnus Prostur | 6 November 2023 | 1st National Student (Youth) Games | Nanning, China | |
| 4 × 400 m relay | 3:11.28 | Hong Kong; Chan Ka Chun; Leung King Hung; Ho Tsz Fung; Choi Ho Sing | 29 September 2014 | Asian Games | Incheon, South Korea | |
| 4 × 800 m relay | 7:50.17 | Road Runner Athletic Club; Khan Muzammil; Chu Lok Yin; Sean Hsien-Ming Fontaine; Khan Mohammad Kamran | 18 January 2025 | Pre-season Athletics Trial Cum Relay Carnival | Hong Kong, Hong Kong | |
| 4 × 1500 m relay | 16:54.08 | Tsuen Wan Athletics Club; Lau Wai Ngai; Yeung Chi Wing; Chan Ka Ho; Li Hong Ching | 8 May 2011 | IAAF World Athletics Day and Open Meet | Hong Kong, Hong Kong | |

=== Women ===
| Event | Record | Athlete | Date | Meet | Place | Ref. |
|---|---|---|---|---|---|---|
| 100 m | 11.62 (+0.4 m/s) | Lam On Ki | 21 April 2019 | Asian Championships | Doha, Qatar | |
| 200 m | 23.79 (±0.0 m/s) | Wan Kin Yee | 16 May 1999 | Xian NGP | Xi'an, China | |
| 400 m | 55.03 | Wan Kin Yee | 20 March 1999 | All China Athletics Championship | Zhuhai, China | |
| 800 m | 2:11.92 | Li Yin Yee | 3 November 1996 | Open Meet IV | Hong Kong, Hong Kong | |
| 1500 m | 4:21.60 | Maggie Chan Man Yee | 8 July 1999 | Universiade | Palma de Mallorca, Spain | |
| Mile | 4:58.91 | Maggie Chan Man Yee | 9 December 1994 | | Hong Kong, Hong Kong | |
| 3000 m | 9:14.00 | Maggie Chan Man Yee | 16 April 1999 | Mt. SAC Relays | Walnut, United States | |
| 5000 m | 15:45.87 | Maggie Chan Man Yee | 3 May 2002 | Stanford Cardinal Invitational | Palo Alto, United States | |
| 10,000 m | 32:39.88 | Maggie Chan Man Yee | 19 April 2002 | Mt. SAC Relays | Walnut, United States | |
| 10 km (road) | 33:48+ | Yiu Kit Ching | 17 October 2020 | World Half Marathon Championships | Gdynia, Poland | |
| 15 km (road) | 51:06+ | Yiu Kit Ching | 17 October 2020 | World Half Marathon Championships | Gdynia, Poland | |
| 20 km (road) | 1:08:34+ | Yiu Kit Ching | 17 October 2020 | World Half Marathon Championships | Gdynia, Poland | |
| Half marathon | 1:12:10 | Yiu Kit Ching | 17 October 2020 | World Half Marathon Championships | Gdynia, Poland | |
| 25 km (road) | 1:28:29+ | Yiu Kit Ching | 16 May 2021 | Milano City Marathon | Milan, Italy | |
| 30 km (road) | 1:46:53+ | Yiu Kit Ching | 16 May 2021 | Milano City Marathon | Milan, Italy | |
| Marathon | 2:31:24 (Note: by federation and World Athletics sources; 2:31:21 by official result source) | Yiu Kit Ching | 16 May 2021 | Milano City Marathon | Milan, Italy | |
| 100 m hurdles | 13.14 (±0.0 m/s) | Chan Sau Ying | 17 April 1994 | Mt. SAC Relays | Walnut, United States | |
| 400 m hurdles | 1:00.75 | Ma Ying Wen Ashleigh | 10 May 2026 | Hong Kong Championships | Wan Chai, Hong Kong | |
| 3000 m steeplechase | 10:25.81 | Yiu Kit Ching | 9 October 2013 | East Asian Games | Tianjin, China | |
| High jump | 1.88 m | Yeung Man Wai | 30 April 2017 | Asian Grand Prix | Taipei City, Taiwan | |
| Pole vault | 3.55 m | Choi Sin Ting | 23 April 2017 | Hong Kong Athletics Series Meet 3 | Hong Kong, Hong Kong | |
| Long jump | 6.50 m (+0.1 m/s) | Yue Nga Yan Tiffany | 2 October 2023 | Asian Games | Hangzhou, China | |
| Triple jump | 12.99 m (+1.0 m/s) | Chan Shannon Vera | 26 February 2023 | Hong Kong Athletics Series 1 | Hong Kong, Hong Kong | |
| Shot put | 13.59 m | To Yuen Kwan | 23 May 2021 | ASICS Hong Kong Athletics Series 2021 - Series 3 | Hong Kong, Hong Kong | |
| Discus throw | 44.20 m | To Yuen Kwan | 28 May 2022 | Hong Kong Athletics Series 2022 - Series 3 | Hong Kong, Hong Kong | |
| Hammer throw | 52.59 m | Lam Sau Kwan | 19 May 2016 | Taiwan Open Championships | Taoyuan, Taiwan | |
| Javelin throw | 49.37 m | Ng Ki Sum | 26 June 2016 | Hong Kong Inter-City Athletics Championships | Hong Kong, Hong Kong | |
| Heptathlon | 4968 pts | Chan Sau Ying | 21–22 May 1993 | | Redding, United States | |
| Heptathlon | 100m H (wind) / High jump / Shot put / 200m (wind) / Long jump (wind) / Javelin / 800m; 13.86 / 1.57 m / 9.70 m / 25.25 / 6.03 m / 28.28 m / 2:38.34 | | | | | |
| 3000 m walk (track) | 13:48.0 h | Ching Siu Nga | 4 October 2015 | | St. Louis, United States | |
| 5000 m walk (track) | 22:17.57 | Ching Siu Nga | 4 July 2018 | Hokuren Distance Challenge (Abashiri) | Abashiri, Japan | |
| 5 km walk (road) | 23:56+ | Ching Siu Nga | 19 April 2015 | 46th Internationales Straßengehen | Naumburg, Germany | |
| 10,000 m walk (track) | 45:46.93 | Ching Siu Nga | 7 July 2018 | Hokuren Distance Challenge (Abashiri) | Kitami, Japan | |
| 10 km walk (road) | 45:36 | Ching Siu Nga | 1 January 2021 | 69th New Year Race Walking | Tokyo, Japan | |
| 15 km walk (road) | 1:10:56+ | Ching Siu Nga | 13 August 2017 | World Championships | London, United Kingdom | |
| 20 km walk (road) | 1:32:30 | Ching Siu Nga | 17 February 2019 | Japanese Race Walking Championships | Kobe, Japan | |
| 35 km walk (road) | 2:59:32 | Ching Siu Nga | 16 April 2023 | Japanese 35km Racewalking Championships | Wajima, Japan | |
| 50 km walk (road) | 5:40:51 | Kwok Chik Ha | 1 January 2020 | The First Walk 2020 | Hong Kong, Hong Kong | |
| 4 × 100 m relay | 44.88 | Hong Kong; Chan Pui Kei; Pak Hoi Man Chloe; Tang Cheuk Man Serena; Kong Chun Ki | 31 May 2025 | Asian Championships | Gumi, South Korea | |
| 4 × 200 m relay | 1:36.71 | Hong Kong; Pak Hoi Man Chloe; Chow Chi Kiu; Yau Sin Ting Nicole; Karlsson Jane Christa Ming Suet | 6 November 2023 | 1st National Student (Youth) Games | Nanning, China | |
| 4 × 400 m relay | 3:46.87 | Hong Kong; Ying Wen Ashleigh; Puikwan Tang; Chow Chi Kiu; Jane Karlsson | 16 July 2023 | Asian Championships | Bangkok, Thailand | |
| 4 × 800 m relay | 9:25.20 | Watsons Athletic Club; Cheung Ting Yan; Au Yeung Hok Ka; Chan Sin Hung; Chan Yee Ki | 6 May 2012 | IAAF World Athletics Day and Open Meet | Hong Kong, Hong Kong | |
| 4 × 1500 m relay | 20:11.23 | Pacers Athletics Club; Chung Man Tung; Leung Ying Suet; Yu Wing Hay; Yiu Kit Ching | 8 May 2011 | IAAF World Athletics Day and Open Meet | Hong Kong, Hong Kong | |

=== Mixed ===
| Event | Record | Athlete | Date | Meet | Place | Ref. |
|---|---|---|---|---|---|---|
| 4 × 400 m relay | 3:35.39 | Hong Kong; Tsun San Lau; Chi Ku Chow; Lok Yin Chu; Jane Christa Ming Suet Karlsson | 5 June 2023 | Asian U20 Championships | Yecheon, South Korea | |

== Indoor ==
=== Men ===
| Event | Record | Athlete | Date | Meet | Place | Ref. |
|---|---|---|---|---|---|---|
| 60 m | 6.65 | Shak Kam Ching | 11 February 2023 | Asian Championships | Astana, Kazakhstan | |
| 200 m | 21.79 | Chiang Wai Hung | 18 February 2004 | Asian Championships | Tianjin, China | |
| 400 m | 48.89 | Chan Ka Chun | 19 February 2016 | Asian Championships | Doha, Qatar | |
| 800 m | 1:56.28 | Lau Tak Lung | 1 November 2007 | Asian Indoor Games | Macau, Macau | |
| 1500 m | 4:00.63 | Sebastian Sutch | 8 February 2025 | BU Bruce Lehane Scarlet and White Invitational | Boston, United States | |
| 3000 m | 8:42.98 | Sebastian Sutch | 24 January 2025 | Riverhawk Invitational | Boston, United States | |
| 60 m hurdles | 7.83 | Cheung Wang Fung | 11 February 2023 | Asian Championships | Astana, Kazakhstan | |
| High jump | 2.25 m A | Marc Chenn | 17 February 2001 | Air Force Academy | Colorado Springs, United States | |
| Pole vault | 4.45 m | Cheung Pui Yin | 15 March 2020 | Sport City Winter Indoor Series | Manchester, United Kingdom | |
| Long jump | 7.85 m | Chan Ming Tai | 21 February 2016 | Asian Championships | Doha, Qatar | |
| Triple jump | 14.39 m | Ko Ho Long | 20 September 2017 | Asian Indoor and Martial Arts Games | Ashgabat, Turkmenistan | |
| Shot put | 13.63 m | Chiu Lap San | 11 February 2007 | Asian Indoor Athletics Invitational Tournament | Macau, Macau | |
| Heptathlon | 3630 pts | Cheung Pui Yi | 17 December 2017 | | London, United Kingdom | |
| Heptathlon | 60m / Long jump / Shot put / High jump / 60m H / Pole vault / 1000m; 7.56s / 5.18 m / 8.15 m / 1.72 m / 9.20 m / 3.70 m / 3:40.93 | | | | | |
| 5000 m walk | | | | | | |
| 4 × 400 m relay | 3:31.65 | Hong Kong; Wong Ka Chun; Tsui Yun Yung; Tam Ho Yan; Fan Wai Ho | 11 February 2007 | Asian Indoor Athletics Invitational Tournament | Macau, Macau | |

=== Women ===
| Event | Record | Athlete | Date | Meet | Place | Ref. |
|---|---|---|---|---|---|---|
| 60 m | 7.44 | Chan Pui Kei | 18 February 2024 | Asian Championships | Tehran, Iran | |
| 200 m | 24.36 | Wan Kin Yee | 22 February 1999 | | Tianjin, China | |
| 400 m | 1:02.09 | Cheng Shan Shan | 10 February 2007 | Asian Indoor Athletics Invitational Tournament | Macau, Macau | |
| 800 m | 2:22.35 | Roseda Lo Wing Hei | 11 February 2007 | Asian Indoor Athletics Invitational Tournament | Macau, Macau | |
| 1500 m | 5:12.66 | Leung Ying Suet | 11 February 2007 | Asian Indoor Athletics Invitational Tournament | Macau, Macau | |
| 3000 m | 9:19.28 | Maggie Chan Man Yee | 6 March 1999 | Lincoln Husker Invitational | Indianapolis, United States | |
| 55 m hurdles | 7.59 A | Chan Sau Ying | 26 February 1994 | | Flagstaff, United States | |
| 60 m hurdles | 8.22 | Shing Cho Yan | 8 February 2026 | Asian Championships | Tianjin, China | |
| High jump | 1.83 m | Yeung Man Wai | 18 September 2017 | Asian Indoor and Martial Arts Games | Ashgabat, Turkmenistan | |
| Pole vault | 3.30 m | Choi Sin Ting | 22 March 2017 | Nantou Taiwan International Pole Vault Championship | Tsaotun, Taiwan | |
| Long jump | 6.45 m | Yue Nga Yan Tiffany | 17 February 2024 | Asian Championships | Tehran, Iran | |
| Triple jump | 12.73 m | Chan Shannon Vera | 18 February 2024 | Asian Championships | Tehran, Iran | |
| Shot put | 11.92 m | Tin Ka Yin | 10 February 2007 | Asian Indoor Athletics Invitational Tournament | Macau, Macau | |
| Pentathlon | 3129 pts | Pak Yan Poon | 20 January 2012 | Newport News Captain's Invitational | Newport News, United States | |
| Pentathlon | 60m H / High jump / Shot put / Long jump / 800m; 9.04 / 1.50 m / 10.83 m / 5.25 m / 2:56.94 | | | | | |
| 3000 m walk | 18:36.71 | Kwan Siu Yin | 26 March 2019 | World Masters Championships | Toruń, Poland | |
| 4 × 400 m relay | 4:01.58 | Hong Kong; Cheng Shan Shan; Leung Hiu Yee; Roseda La Wing Hei; Hui Man Ling | 11 February 2007 | Asian Indoor Athletics Invitational Tournament | Macau, Macau | |
