= Chisato Kiyoyama =

Japanese hurdler (born 1991)

Personal information
- Nationality: Japanese
- Born: 24 July 1991 (age 34)

Sport
- Sport: Athletics
- Event: Hurdles

Achievements and titles
- Personal best(s): 60m hurdles: 8.09 (Osaka, 2026); 100m hurdles: 12.77 (Yokohama, 2025)
Medal record
Women's athletics
Representing Japan
Asian Indoor Championships
Silver medal – second place	2026 Tanjijn	60 m hurdles

Chisato Kiyoyama (born 24 July 1991) is a Japanese sprint hurdler. She won the silver medal in the 60 metres hurdles at the 2026 Asian Indoor Athletics Championships.

== Biography ==
From Kyushu, she began competing in athletics when at middle school, but her early career was hampered by repeated stress fracture injuries which necessitated the incision of a titanium plate into her fibula.

In 2023, she placed second in the 60 metres hurdles at the Japanese Indoor Athletics Championships in Osaka. That month, she placed fourth representing Japan in the 60 metres hurdles at the 2023 Asian Indoor Athletics Championships in Kazakhstan.

In February 2025, she placed third in the 60 metres hurdles at the Japanese Indoor Championships had an international win over 100 metres hurdles at the Adelaide Invitational in Australia. In July 2025, she was a finalist in the 100 metres hurdles at the 2025 Japanese Athletics Championships, running 13.10 seconds in the final. The following month, she ran a personal best of 12.77 seconds for the 100m hurdles at the Twilight Games in Yokohama.

In February 2026, she won the silver medal in the 60 metres hurdles at the 2026 Asian Indoor Athletics Championships in Tianjin, China, finishing behind Bo-ya Zhang of Taiwan but ahead of compatriot Hitomi Nakajima. She was subsequently selected the following month by the Japanese Athletics Federation to compete at the 2026 World Athletics Indoor Championships in Poland.
