= List of Bangladeshi records in athletics =

The following are the national records in athletics in Bangladesh maintained by the Bangladesh Athletic Federation (BAF).

== Outdoor ==
Key to tables: Awaiting ratification Record not kept by BAF Not ratified or later rescinded by BAF

=== Men ===
Event	Record	Athlete	Date	Meet	Place	Ref.
100 m	10.11 (+1.1 m/s)	Imranur Rahman	3 September 2023	Newham & Essex Beagles Outdoor Series	London, United Kingdom	
100 m	10.06 A (+0.1 m/s) (Note: All time results during the first three days of competition have been cancelled because of wrong chronometre.)	Imranur Rahman	9 August 2022	Islamic Solidarity Games	Konya, Turkey	
200 m	21.15 (±0.0 m/s)	Mohamed Mahbub Alam	28 September 1999	South Asian Games	Kathmandu, Nepal	
400 m	47.34	Mohammad Jahir Rayhan	3 November 2019	Indian U-20 Championships	Mangalagiri, India	
400 m	46.86	Mohammad Jahir Rayhan	25 January 2019	Bangladesh Championship	Dhaka, Bangladesh	
800 m	1:51.16	Mohamed Hossain Milzer	23 September 1988	Olympic Games	Seoul, South Korea	
1500 m	3:50.46	Ahmed Mustaque	23 November 1987	South Asian Games	Calcutta, India	
3000 m						
5000 m	14:47.19	Mohamed Eliysuddin	21 December 1995		Madras, India	
10,000 m	30:27.7 h	Mohamed Eliysuddin	18-20 March 1999		Dhaka, Bangladesh	
Half marathon	1:10:37	Mohamed Elahi Sardar	20 January 2023	Bangabandhu International Half Marathon	Dhaka, Bangladesh	
Marathon	2:22:03	Ali Mohamed	7 March 1987		Dhaka, Bangladesh	
110 m hurdles	14.09 (−0.2 m/s)	Rahman Mahfuzur	15 July 2012		Pescara, Italy	
400 m hurdles	51.87	Abdur Rahim Nayeem	25 December 1993	South Asian Games	Dhaka, Bangladesh	
3000 m steeplechase	9:04.6 h	Shamsuddin	1981		Dhaka, Bangladesh	
High jump	2.16 m	Mahfuzur Rahman	3 December 2019	South Asian Games	Kathmandu, Nepal	
Pole vault	4.35 m	Humayun Kabir	29 April 2006		Dhaka, Bangladesh	
Pole vault	4.40 m	Mohd Shorov Mia	12 May 2024	27th AFI Meet	Bhubaneswar, India	
Pole vault	4.40 m	Mohd Shorov Miah	16 June 2024	Cahya Mata Open Championships	Kuantan, Malaysia	
Pole vault	4.50 m	Mohd Shorov Miah	19 February 2025	48th National Championships	Dhaka, Bangladesh	
Long jump	7.61 m NWI	Mohamed Ali Amin	3 April 2009		Dhaka, Bangladesh	
Triple jump	15.55 m	Afzal Hossain	13 February 1991		Dhaka, Bangladesh	
Shot put	14.53 m	Mohammad Ibrahim	25 January 2019	Bangladesh Championship	Dhaka, Bangladesh	
Shot put	14.89 m	Golam Sarwar	10 February 2024	Bangladesh Championship	Dhaka, Bangladesh	
Discus throw	44.98 m	Azharul Islam	6 February 2010	South Asian Games	Dhaka, Bangladesh	
Hammer throw	56.54 m	Monimul Hoque	22 December 1992		Dhaka, Bangladesh	
Javelin throw	64.05 m	Moniruzzaman	23 December 2017		Dhaka, Bangladesh	
Decathlon						
Decathlon	100m / Long jump / Shot put / High jump / 400m / 110m H / Discus / Pole vault / Javelin / 1500m					
20 km walk (road)	1:30:40	Shafiuddin Titu	19-21 December 1996		Dhaka, Bangladesh	
50 km walk (road)						
4 × 100 m relay	40.45	Imranur Rahman ? ? ?	24 September 2022		Dhaka, Bangladesh	
4 × 400 m relay	3:12.41	Bangladesh; Mohamed Hossain Milzer; M. Giasuddin; F. Khan Choudhury; Abdul Rahim Nayeem	25 December 1993	South Asian Games	Dhaka, Bangladesh	

=== Women ===
Event	Record	Athlete	Date	Meet	Place	Ref.
100 m	11.95 (+1.0 m/s)	Shirin Akter	23 September 2022		Dhaka, Bangladesh	
100 m	11.6 h	Beauty Nazmun Nahar	6 April 2008	Bangladesh Championship	Dhaka, Bangladesh	
200 m	24.2 h NWI	Shirin Akter	4 April 2021		Dhaka, Bangladesh	
200 m	24.52 NWI	Shirin Akter	10 February 2024	Bangladesh Championship	Dhaka, Bangladesh	
400 m	55.46	Beauty Nazmun Nahar	5 April 2004		Islamabad, Pakistan	
800 m	2:13.3 h	Sharmila Ray Chakma	22 December 1985	South Asian Games	Dhaka, Bangladesh	
1500 m	4:50.3 h	Rawshanara Putul	3 April 2009		Dhaka, Bangladesh	
3000 m	10:25.3 h	Rinki Biswas	5 January 2022	Bangladeshi Championships	Dhaka, Bangladesh	
5000 m	21:17.60	Sumi Akter	9 February 2016	South Asian Games	Guwaharati, India	
5000 m	19:41.40	Rinki Biswas	23 December 2022	Bangladeshi Championships	Dhaka, Bangladesh	
5000 m	18:49.38	Samsun Nahar Ratna	9 February 2024	Bangladesh Championship	Dhaka, Bangladesh	
10,000 m	42:34.1 h	Rinki Biswas	4 January 2022	Bangladeshi Championships	Dhaka, Bangladesh	
10,000 m	41:09.32	Papiya Khatun	25 December 2022	Bangladeshi Championships	Dhaka, Bangladesh	
Half marathon	1:31:53	Prithi Akther	26 January 2024		Dhaka, Bangladesh	
Marathon	3:39:50	Papiya Khatun	10 January 2022	Bangabandhu Sheikh Mujib Dhaka Marathon	Dhaka, Bangladesh	
Marathon	3:29:47	Papiya Khatun	20 January 2023	Bangabandhu International Marathon	Dhaka, Bangladesh	
Marathon	3:18:46	Papiya Khatun	26 January 2024	Bangabandhu International Marathon	Dhaka, Bangladesh	
100 m hurdles	13.99 (+0.5 m/s)	Sumita Rani	7 February 2010	South Asian Games	Dhaka, Bangladesh	
100 m hurdles	13.80 NWI	Sumita Rani	23 October 2009		Dhaka, Bangladesh	
400 m hurdles	1:06.63	Borsha Khatun	23/25 December 2022	Bangladeshi Championships	Dhaka, Bangladesh	
3000 m steeplechase						
High jump	1.71 m	Umme Hafsa Rumki	3 January 2022	Bangladeshi Championships	Dhaka, Bangladesh	
High jump	1.73 m	Ritu Akhter	11 August 2022	Islamic Solidarity Games	Konya, Turkey	
High jump	1.75 m	Ritu Akhter	23 December 2022	Bangladeshi Championships	Dhaka, Bangladesh	
High jump	1.76 m	Ritu Akhter	9 February 2024	Bangladesh Championship	Dhaka, Bangladesh	
Pole vault						
Long jump	6.07 m (+0.2 m/s)	Foujia Huda	2 April 2004		Islamabad, Pakistan	
Long jump	6.07 m (−0.1 m/s)	Foujia Huda	12 June 2004		Ipoh, Malaysia	
Long jump	6.07 m	Foujia Huda	25 August 2006	South Asian Games	Colombo, Sri Lanka	
Triple jump	12.38 m NWI	Sonia Akhter	25 December 2022	Bangladeshi Championships	Dhaka, Bangladesh	
Shot put	12.14 m	Nelly Jesmin	8 September 1992		Dhaka, Bangladesh	
Shot put	13.52 m	Zakia Akhter	9 February 2024	Bangladesh Championship	Dhaka, Bangladesh	
Discus throw	42.90 m	Joytsna Afroz	25 December 1993	South Asian Games	Dhaka, Bangladesh	
Discus throw	43.49 m	Jafreen Akhter	24 December 2022	Bangladeshi Championships	Dhaka, Bangladesh	
Hammer throw						
Javelin throw	42.60 m	Hajera Akhtar	16/17 April 2004		Mirpur, Bangladesh	
Heptathlon						
Heptathlon	100m H / High jump / Shot put / 200m / Long jump / Javelin / 800m					
20 km walk (road)						
4 × 100 m relay	46.80	Bangladesh; Sumita Rani; J. Akhter; Shamsun Nahar Chumky; I. J. Eva	7 February 2010	South Asian Games	Dhaka, Bangladesh	
4 × 400 m relay	3:52.59	Bangladesh; J. Akhter; K. Khatun; Rawshanara Putul; I.J. Eva	8 February 2010	South Asian Games	Dhaka, Bangladesh	

== Indoor ==
=== Men ===
Event	Record	Athlete	Date	Meet	Place	Ref.
60 m	6.59	Imranur Rahman	11 February 2023	Asian Championships	Astana, Kazakhstan	
200 m	23.01	Mohamed Masudul Karim	7 February 2004	Asian Championships	Tehran, Iran	
400 m	48.10	Mohammad Jahir Rayhan	18 February 2024	Asian Championships	Tehran, Iran	
800 m	1:59.14	Hassan Kamrul	1 February 2018	Asian Championships	Tehran, Iran	
1500 m						
3000 m						
60 m hurdles	7.89	Mahfuzur Rahman	29 January 2012		Rome, Italy	
High jump
High jump	2.15 m	Mahfuzur Rahman	19 February 2024	Asian Championships	Tehran, Iran	
High jump	1.50 m	Sahad Khan	8 December 2019		Reims, France	
Pole vault						
Long jump	4.82 m (second jump)	Sahad Khan	8 December 2019		Reims, France	
Long jump	4.82 m (third jump)	Sahad Khan	8 December 2019		Reims, France	
Triple jump						
Shot put	12.83 m	Hossain Imtiaz	2 February 2018	Asian Championships	Tehran, Iran	
Heptathlon						
Heptathlon	60m / Long jump / Shot put / High jump / 60m H / Pole vault / 1000m					
5000 m walk						
4 × 400 m relay						

=== Women ===
Event	Record	Athlete	Date	Meet	Place	Ref.
60 m	7.86	Shirin Akter	18 February 2024	Asian Championships	Tehran, Iran	
200 m						
400 m	1:01.69	Sumi Akther	9 February 2018		Tehran, Iran	
800 m	2:42.23	Sumi Akther	1 February 2018	Asian Championships	Tehran, Iran	
1500 m						
3000 m						
60 m hurdles						
High jump	1.55 m	Sathi Parveen	12 October 2001		Rasht, Iran	
Pole vault						
Long jump	5.85 m	Foujia Huda	12 October 2001		Rasht, Iran	
Triple jump						
Shot put						
Pentathlon						
Pentathlon	60m H / High jump / Shot put / Long jump / 800m					
3000 m walk						
4 × 400 m relay						
