= Pavithram =

Pavithram (lit. 'pure') may refer to:

- Pavithram (1994 film), an Indian Malayalam-language film by T. K. Rajeev Kumar
- Pavithram (TV series), an Indian Malayalam-language soap opera broadcast on Asianet

== See also ==
- Pavitra (disambiguation)
