= Maggie Chan (athlete) =

Hong Kong long-distance runner

Personal information
- Full name: Maggie Chan Man Yee
- Nationality: Hong Konger
- Born: 28 October 1975 (age 50)
- Height: 5 ft 4 in (163 cm)

Sport
- Sport: Long-distance running
- Events: 1500 metres, 5000 metres, 10,000 metres, Marathon

Maggie Chan Man Yee (Chinese: 陳敏儀; pinyin: Chén Mǐnyí; born 28 October 1975), also known as Maggie Chan-Roper, is a Hong Kong long-distance runner. She competed in the women's 5000 metres and women's 10,000 metres at the 2000 Summer Olympics.

She also qualified to represent Hong Kong at the 2004 Olympics in the marathon through a 2:35 finish in the 2004 Salt Lake City Marathon – six months after becoming a mother, but was unable to participate as she fractured her foot, requiring surgery.

Chan is the current Hong Kong record holder in the 1500m (4:21.60, in 1999), 3000m (9:14.00, in 1999), 5000m (15:45.87, in 2002), 10,000m (32:39.88, in 2002) and Mile (4:58.91, in 1994).

Since 2006, Chan has registered with World Athletics that her national allegiance is to the United States.

== Running history ==
Chan began running aged nine, entering an organised race without any training, in an effort to beat her elder sister Amanda, placing in the top 10 against the older field.

At age 15, she set a new Hong Kong record in the Mile.

== Personal life ==
Chan has a bachelor's degree in Food Science (2000) and a master's in Exercise Physiology (2011), both from Brigham Young University in the United States.

In August 2000, she married American Brent Roper, a former Mormon missionary in Hong Kong. They have three children, including son Skyler Roper, born 2003, who successfully represents his high school (Brandeis HS) at running. Chan and her family now live in the US, where she is a professional athletics coach.
