= Pavitra =

Pavitra (lit. 'pure') may refer to:

- Pavitra (1986 film), Indian Telugu-language drama film
- Pavitra (2013 film), Indian Telugu-language adult film
- Pavitra (disciple) (1894–1969), disciple of Sri Aurobindo and The Mother
- Pavitra Lokesh, Indian film and television actress

== See also ==
- Pavithra (disambiguation)
- Pavithram (disambiguation)
- Pavithran (disambiguation)
