= Pavithran =

Pavithran may refer to:

- Pavithran (Tamil film director), Indian film director in Tamil cinema
- Pavithran Selladoria, Malaysian-Indian association football player
- V. K. Pavithran, Indian film director in Malayalam cinema

== See also ==
- Pavitra (disambiguation)
- Kallan Pavithran, a 1981 Indian film by Padmarajan
