= Ching Siu Nga =

Hong Kong racewalker

Personal information
- Nationality: Hong Konger
- Born: 11 February 1987 (age 39)

Sport
- Sport: Athletics
- Event: Racewalking

Jessica Ching Siu Nga (Chinese: 程小雅; born 11 February 1987) is a Hong Kong racewalking athlete. She qualified to represent Hong Kong at the 2020 Summer Olympics in Tokyo 2021, competing in women's 20 kilometres walk.
