= Bangladesh at the 2019 World Athletics Championships =

- WA code: BAN

in Doha, Qatar
- Competitors: 1
- Medals: Gold 0 Silver 0 Bronze 0 Total 0

World Athletics Championships appearances
- 1991; 1993; 1995; 1997; 1999–2001; 2003; 2005; 2007; 2009; 2011; 2013; 2015; 2017; 2019; 2022; 2023

Bangladesh competed at the 2019 World Athletics Championships in Doha, Qatar, from 27 September – 6 October 2019.

== Results ==
(q – qualified, NM – no mark, SB – season best)

=== Men ===
Track and road events

Athlete	Event	Preliminary Round		Heat		Semi-final		Final	
Athlete	Event	Result	Rank	Result	Rank	Result	Rank	Result	Rank
Mohammad Jahir Rayhan	400 metres	48.48	40	Did not advance					
