= List of Uzbekistani records in athletics =

The following are the national records in athletics in Uzbekistan maintained by the Athletic Federation of Uzbekistan (AFU).

== Outdoor ==
Key to tables: Awaiting ratification Record not kept by AFU Not ratified or later rescinded by AFU

=== Men ===
Event	Record	Athlete	Date	Meet	Place	Ref.
100 m	10.31	Pyotr Vorobyov	17 July 1985		Leningrad, Soviet Union	
200 m	20.74 NWI	Oleg Juravlyov	21 June 2008		Almaty, Kazakhstan	
400 m	45.37	Sergey Lovachev	22 June 1984		Kiev, Soviet Union	
800 m	1:46.98	Erkinjon Isakov	23 July 2004		Bishkek, Kyrgyzstan	
1500 m	3:44.0 h	Ilshat Kalimuddin	30 July 1987		Chelyabinsk, Soviet Union	
3000 m	8:00.08 (Note: ratified by AFU but not recognised by World Athletics)	Abdirahman Ibragimov	23 May 1981		Kyiv, Ukraine	
3000 m	8:05.04 (Note: recognised by World Athletics)	Abdirahman Ibragimov	8 May 1979		Tashkent, Soviet Union	
5000 m	13:41.0 h	Ashur Normuradov	19 August 1975		Podolsk, Soviet Union	
5 km (road)	14:19+	Shokhrukh Davlatov	27 October 2024	Valencia Half Marathon	Valencia, Spain	
10,000 m	28:48.4 h	Abdirahman Ibragimov	9 August 1980		Kharkov, Soviet Union	
10 km (road)	29:08+	Shokhrukh Davlatov	27 October 2024	Valencia Half Marathon	Valencia, Spain	
15 km (road)	43:48+	Shokhrukh Davlatov	27 October 2024	Valencia Half Marathon	Valencia, Spain	
20 km (road)	58:37+	Shokhrukh Davlatov	27 October 2024	Valencia Half Marathon	Valencia, Spain	
Half marathon	1:01:48	Shokhrukh Davlatov	27 October 2024	Valencia Half Marathon	Valencia, Spain	
Half marathon	1:01:24	Shokhrukh Davlatov	15 April 2023	13th International Half Marathon	Dushanbe, Tajikistan	
Marathon	2:13:28	Vladimir Beloborodov	15 June 1985		Mogilev, Soviet Union	
110 m hurdles	13.27	Sergey Usov	11 June 1988		Leningrad, Soviet Union	
400 m hurdles	48.78	Aleksandr Kharlov	20 June 1983		Moscow, Soviet Union	
3000 m steeplechase	8:27.51	Anatoliy Dimov	19 June 1983		Moscow, Soviet Union	
3000 m steeplechase	8:19.75	Anatoliy Dimov	31 July 1980		Moscow, Soviet Union	
High jump	2.32 m	Gennadiy Belkov	29 May 1982		Tashkent, Soviet Union	
Pole vault	6.00 m	Rodion Gataullin	16 September 1989		Tokyo, Japan	
Long jump	8.29 (+0.7 m/s)	Anvar Anvarov	26 June 2026	Boris Hanžeković Memorial	Zagreb, Croatia	
Triple jump	17.36 m	Vladimir Chernikov	21 August 1988		Odessa, Soviet Union	
Shot put	20.81 m	Grigoriy Skorikov	24 May 1983		Tashkent, Soviet Union	
Discus throw	62.46 m	Sergey Shchegolov	23 May 1980		Tashkent, Soviet Union	
Discus throw	62.46 m	Roman Poltoratskiy	15 June 2000		Tashkent, Uzbekistan	
Hammer throw	82.66 m	Andrey Abduvaliyev	9 July 1997		Tula, Russia	
Javelin throw	87.20 m	Viktor Zaytsev	23 June 1992		Moscow, Russia	
Decathlon	8445 pts	Ramil Ganiyev	5–6 August 1997	World Championships	Athens, Greece	
Decathlon	100m / Long jump / Shot put / High jump / 400m / 110m H / Discus / Pole vault / Javelin / 1500m; 10.94 (+0.2 m/s) / 7.58 m (+0.7 m/s) / 14.76 m / 2.06 m / 48.34 / 14.34 (−0.1 m/s) / 46.04 m / 5.30 m / 55.14 m / 4:36.78					
10,000 m walk (track)	42:09.93	Shokhrukh Solomov	17 August 2019	Uzbek Athletics Open Cup	Tashkent, Uzbekistan	
10 km walk (road)	44:57	Shokhrukh Solomov	10 November 2017	Open Uzbekistani Championships	Tashkent, Uzbekistan	
20 km walk (road)	1:23:22	Nikolay Bashkirtsev	13 May 1984		Cheboksary, Soviet Union	
50 km walk (road)	3:54:47	Ionat Olikh	3 August 1985		Leningrad, Soviet Union	
4 × 100 m relay	39.70	Uzbek SSR; Sergey Pavlov; Zakhir Khuzyakhmetov; Viktor Tabakov; A. Rubinshteyn	20 June 1983		Moscow, Soviet Union	
4 × 400 m relay	3:05.20	Uzbek SSR; Igor Prokudin; Aleksandr Kharlov; Alim Safarov; Sergey Lovachov	22 June 1983		Moscow, Soviet Union	

=== Women ===
Event	Record	Athlete	Date	Meet	Place	Ref.
100 m	11.04 (+2.0 m/s)	Lyubov Perepelova	3 June 2000		Bishkek, Kyrgyzstan	
200 m	22.27	Elvira Barbashina	8 July 1986		Moscow, Soviet Union	
400 m	50.52	Marina Shmonina	6 July 1990		Kiev, Soviet Union	
800 m	1:56.21	Zamira Zaytseva	27 July 1983		Leningrad, Soviet Union	
1500 m	3:56.14	Zamira Zaytseva	27 July 1982		Kiev, Soviet Union	
3000 m	8:26.78	Svetlana Ulmasova	25 July 1982		Kiev, Soviet Union	
5000 m	15:05.50	Svetlana Ulmasova	8 July 1986		Moscow, Soviet Union	
10,000 m	31:57.42	Sitora Hamidova	5 August 2017	World Championships	London, United Kingdom	
10 km (road)	34:03	Sitora Hamidova	7 November 2021	Samarkand Half Marathon	Samarkand, Uzbekistan	
Half marathon	1:16:10	Rashida Khayrutdinova	3 September 2006		Saransk, Russia	
Half marathon	1:13:31	Yekaterina Tunguskova	15 April 2023	13th International Half Marathon	Dushanbe, Tajikistan	
Half marathon	1:13:27+	Yekaterina Tunguskova	6 December 2020	Tashkent Marathon	Tashkent, Uzbekistan	
Half marathon	1:13:27+	Sitora Hamidova	6 December 2020	Tashkent Marathon	Tashkent, Uzbekistan	
Marathon	2:30:36	Nadezhda Usmanova	7 October 1984		Vilnius, Soviet Union	
100 m hurdles	13.00 (−0.2 m/s)	Valentina Kibalnikova	25 June 2016	26th G. Kosanov Memorial	Almaty, Kazakhstan	
400 m hurdles	54.43	Tatyana Zubova	22 June 1984		Kiev, Soviet Union	
3000 m steeplechase	10:32.89	Irina Moroz	27 September 2014	Asian Games	Incheon, South Korea	
3000 m steeplechase	10:29.64	Dilshoda Usmanova	12 May 2023	Uzbekistani U20 Championships	Tashkent, Uzbekistan	
3000 m steeplechase	10:22.41	Dilshoda Usmanova	6 June 2023	Asian U20 Championships	Yecheon, South Korea	
High jump	1.98 m	Lyudmila Butuzova	10 June 1984		Sochi, Soviet Union	
High jump	1.98 m	Svetlana Radzivil	23 May 2008		Tashkent, Uzbekistan	
High jump	1.98 m	Nadiya Dusanova	17 July 2008		Tashkent, Uzbekistan	
Pole vault	3.00 m	Viktoriya Okhilova	25 May 2007		Tashkent, Uzbekistan	
Pole vault	3.00 m	Farida Mariyarova	24–26 April 2017		Andijan, Uzbekistan	
Pole vault	3.70 m	Jasmina Mansurova	10 June 2023	Uzbekistani Championships	Tashkent, Uzbekistan	
Pole vault	3.75 m	Jasmina Mansurova	10 June 2023	Uzbekistani Championships	Tashkent, Uzbekistan	
Pole vault	3.80 m	Jasmina Mansurova	2 July 2023	Qosanov Memorial	Almaty, Kazakhstan	
Long jump	6.81 m (−0.1 m/s)	Yuliya Tarasova	5 June 2010		Tashkent, Uzbekistan	
Triple jump	14.55 m (+1.8 m/s)	Anastasiya Juravleva	6 June 2005		Chania, Greece	
Shot put	19.40 m	Irina Bogomolova	4 June 1983		Riga, Soviet Union	
Discus throw	59.46 m	Valentina Mezentseva	26 May 1980		Tashkent, Soviet Union	
Hammer throw	67.05 m	Zarina Nosirshonova	29 June 2021		Tashkent, Uzbekistan	
Hammer throw	70.74 m	Elina Silyamiyeva	12 May 2024	Central Asian Championships	Tashkent, Uzbekistan	
Javelin throw	61.17 m	Anastasiya Svechnikova	24 April 2012		Tashkent, Uzbekistan	
Heptathlon	6346 pts	Yekaterina Voronina	28–29 May 2021	Uzbekistani Combined Events Championships	Tashkent, Uzbekistan	
Heptathlon	100m H / High jump / Shot put / 200m / Long jump / Javelin / 800m; 14.27 (+0.1 m/s) / 1.85 m / 13.36 m / 24.85 (−0.2 m/s) / 6.27 m (+0.5 m/s) / 49.16 m / 2:12.08					
20 km walk (road)	1:42:04	Rusina Ivoylova	4 September 1988		Mogilev, Soviet Union	
50 km walk (road)						
4 × 100 m relay	43.82	Uzbek SSR; Marina Shmonina; Vera Olenchenko; Elvira Barbashina; Tatyana Vilisova	20 June 1983		Moscow, Soviet Union	
4 × 400 m relay	3:33.07	Uzbekistan; Irina Vorobyeva; Yelena Piskunova; Yekaterina Kremlyova; Natalya Senkina	18 May 2000		Bangkok, Thailand	

=== Mixed ===
Event	Record	Athlete	Date	Meet	Place	Ref.
4 × 400 m relay	3:27.79	Uzbekistan; Hasanbek Rustamjonov; Jonbibi Hukmova; Abbosbek Toshtemirov; Laylo Allaberganova	20 November 2025	Islamic Solidarity Games	Riyadh, Saudi Arabia	

== Indoor ==
=== Men ===
Event	Record	Athlete	Date	Meet	Place	Ref.
50 m	5.72	Anvar Kuchmuradov	4 February 1994		Moscow, Russia	
60 m	6.68	Anvar Kuchmuradov	1 February 1992		Moscow, Russia	
60 m	6.4 h	Pyotr Vorobyov	1 February 1982		Omsk, Soviet Union	
200 m	22.25	Oleg Zhuravlyev	23 January 2004		Tashkent, Uzbekistan	
400 m	46.72	Sergey Lovachov	4 March 1984	European Championships	Gothenburg, Sweden	
800 m	1:47.97	Erkin Isakov	1 February 2001		Tashkent, Uzbekistan	
1500 m	3:54.56	Erkin Isakov	11 February 2005		Volgograd, Russia	
3000 m	8:25.98	Agzam Aliyev	31 January 2003		Tashkent, Uzbekistan	
60 m hurdles	7.58	Sergey Usov	23 February 1991		Moscow, Soviet Union	
High jump	2.30 m	Gennadiy Belkov	30 January 1983		Chelyabinsk, Soviet Union	
Pole vault	6.02 m (Note: outdoor mark ratified as absolute record)	Rodion Gataullin	4 February 1989		Gomel, Soviet Union	
Long jump	7.85 m	Aleksandr Pototskiy	21 January 1990		Lipetsk, Soviet Union	
Triple jump	17.35 m	Vladimir Chernikov	8 February 1987		Penza, Soviet Union	
Shot put	18.88 m	Grigoriy Kamulya	3 March 2007		Tashkent, Uzbekistan	
Heptathlon	5918 pts	Ramil Ganiyev	24–25 February 1990		Sofia, Bulgaria	
Heptathlon	60m / Long jump / Shot put / High jump / 60m H / Pole vault / 1000m; 7.12 / 7.26 m / 14.20 m / 2.15 m / 8.22 / 4.70 m / 2:49.51					
Heptathlon	6031 pts	Vadim Podmaryov	10–11 February 1984		Zaporizhzhya, Soviet Union	
Heptathlon	60m / Long jump / Shot put / High jump / 60m H / Pole vault / 1000m; 6.96 / 7.46 m / 14.76 m / 2.10 m / 8.36 / 4.60 m / 2:41.65					
5000 m walk	20:56.18	Sarvar Husainov	28 February 2004		Tashkent, Uzbekistan	
4 × 400 m relay	3:18.73	Uzbekistan; Abbosbek Toshtemirov; Azizjon Oripov; Aliakbar Allanazarov; Khasanbek Rustamjonov	8 February 2026	Asian Championships	Tianjin, China	

=== Women ===
Event	Record	Athlete	Date	Meet	Place	Ref.
60 m	7.19 (heat)	Guzel Khubbieva	2 February 2005		Samara, Russia	
60 m	7.19 (final)	Guzel Khubbieva	2 February 2005		Samara, Russia	
100 m	11.66	Lyubov Perepelova	12 February 2005		Tampere, Finland	
200 m	23.29	Marina Shmonina	7 February 1992		Moscow, Russia	
400 m	51.22	Marina Shmonina	4 March 1990	European Championships	Glasgow, United Kingdom	
800 m	1:59.2 h	Lyubov Kiryukhina-Tsyoma	4 March 1984		Moscow, Soviet Union	
1000 m	2:39.3 h	Lyubov Kiryukhina-Tsyoma	2 January 1997		Moscow, Soviet Union	
1500 m	4:03.9	Zamira Zaytseva	25 February 1979	European Championships	Vienna, Austria	
Mile	4:30.1 h	Zamira Zaytseva	3 March 1979		Fort Worth, United States	
3000 m	8:54.19	Svetlana Ulmasova	19 February 1982		Moscow, Soviet Union	
60 m hurdles	7.93	Vera Akimova	17 February 1984		Moscow, Soviet Union	
High jump	1.96 m	Galina Brigadnaya	7 February 1986		Moscow, Soviet Union	
High jump	1.96 m	Nadiya Dusanova	20 February 2009		Tashkent, Uzbekistan	
High jump	1.96 m	Svetlana Radzivil	16 February 2014	Asian Championships	Hangzhou, China	
Pole vault	3.00 m (Note: outdoor mark ratified as absolute record)	Viktoriya Okhilova	6 March 2005		Tashkent, Uzbekistan	
Long jump	6.82 m (Note: outdoor mark ratified as absolute record)	Vera Olenchenko	21 January 1990		Volgograd, Soviet Union	
Triple jump	14.24 m	Anastasiya Juravleva	25 February 2006		Piraeus, Greece	
Shot put	19.23 m	Irina Bogomolova	16 January 1983		Moscow, Soviet Union	
Pentathlon	4368 pts	Ekaterina Voronina	10 February 2023	Asian Championships	Astana, Kazakhstan	
Pentathlon	60m H / High jump / Shot put / Long jump / 800m; 8.76 / 1.81 m / 13.47 m / 5.88 m / 2:17.22					
3000 m walk						
4 × 400 m relay	3:46.45	Uzbekistan; Laylo Allaberganova; Kamila Mirsolieva; Malika Radzhabova; Farida Soliyeva	12 February 2023	Asian Championships	Astana, Kazakhstan	
