= Yume Goto =

Japanese athlete (born 2000)

Personal information
- Nationality: Japanese
- Born: 25 February 2000 (age 26)

Sport
- Sport: Athletics
- Event: Middle distance running

Achievements and titles
- Personal bests: 1500m: 4.09.41 (Paris, 2024)
Medal record
Women's Athletics
Representing Japan
Asian Championships
Silver medal – second place	2023 Bangkok	1500 m
Asian Indoor Athletics Championships
Silver medal – second place	2023 Astana	1500 m

Yume Goto (後藤 夢, born 25 February 2000) is a Japanese middle distance runner. She was a silver medalist at the Asian Indoor Athletics Championships and Asian Athletics Championships in 2023 in the 1500 metres.

== Career ==
She was a silver medalist at the 2023 Asian Indoor Athletics Championships in Astana over 1500 metres. She was a silver medalist in the 1500 metres at the 2023 Asian Athletics Championships in Bangkok.

She competed at the 2023 World Athletics Championships in Budapest over 1500 metres. She finished fifth at the delayed 2022 Asian Games 1500 metres race in Hangzhou in October 2023.

She competed in the 1500 metres at the 2024 Summer Olympics in Paris in August 2024, where she ran a new personal best time of 4:09.41.
