= Shak Kam Ching =

Hong Kong sprinter

Personal information
- Born: May 20, 2001 (age 25)
- Education: Hong Kong Baptist University
- Height: 1.78 m (5 ft 10 in)

Sport
- Country: Hong Kong
- Sport: Track and field
- Event(s): 60 m, 100 m, 200 m, 4×100 m relay, 4×200 m relay

Achievements and titles
- Personal bests: 60 m: 6.65 (2023); 100 m: 10.38 (2022); 200 m: 21.07 (2022)
Medal record
Men's Athletics
Representing Hong Kong
Asian Indoor Athletics Championships
Silver medal – second place	2023 Astana	60m

Shak Kam Ching (Chinese: 石錦程; Jyutping: sek^{6} gam^{2} cing^{1}; born May 20, 2001) is a track and field sprint athlete who competes internationally for Hong Kong.

== Background ==
In August 2022, Shak enrolled at the Physical Education department of Hong Kong Baptist University.

In February 2023, Shak obtained a silver medal in the 60 m event of the 2023 Asian Indoor Athletics Championships with a time of 6.65 seconds which was behind the winner, Imranur Rahman.
