= Eki Febri Ekawati =

Indonesian athlete (born 1992)

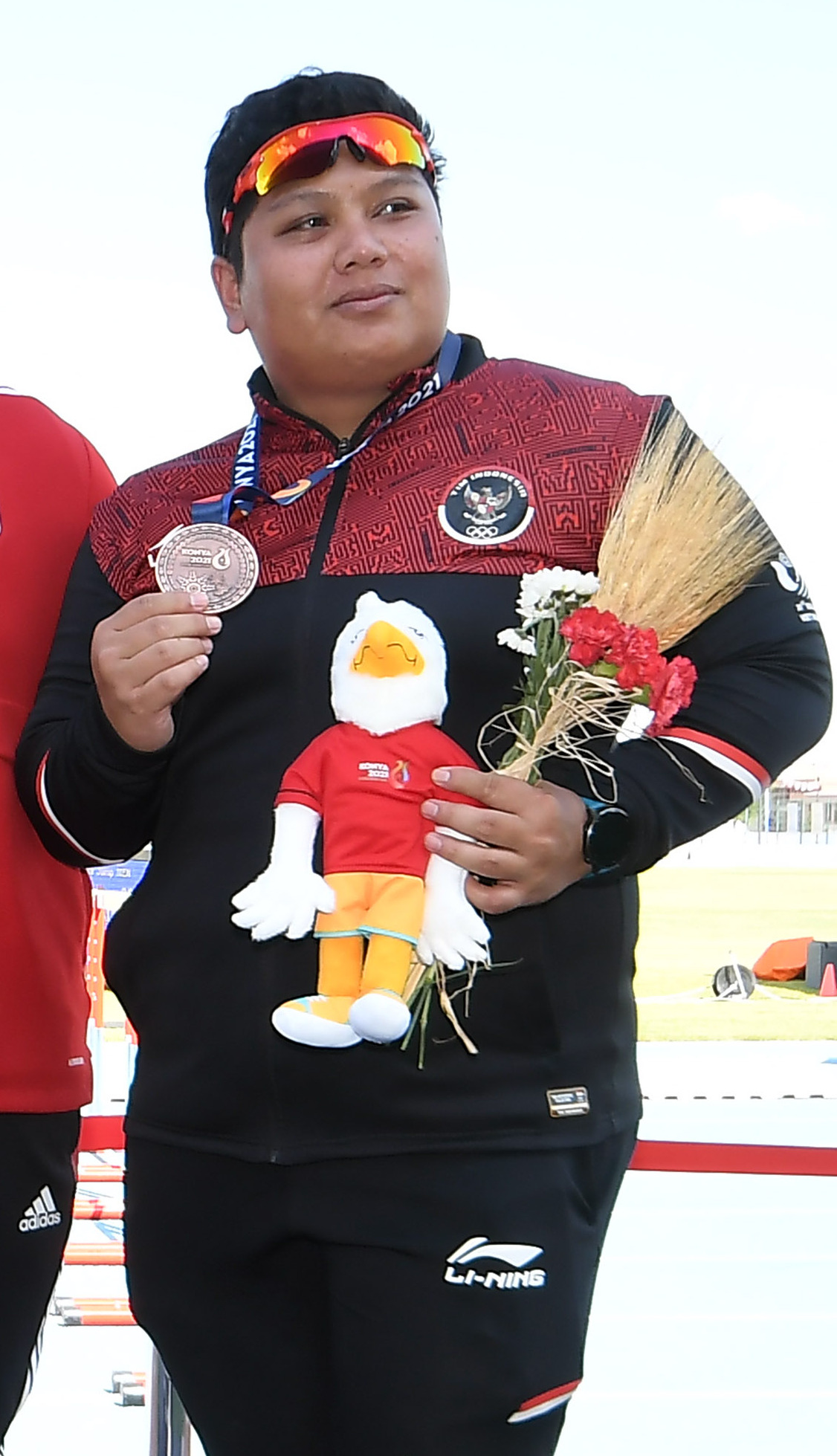

Personal information
- Nationality: Indonesian
- Born: February 18, 1992 (age 34) Kuningan, West Java, Indonesia
- Height: 169 cm (5 ft 7 in)

Sport
- Country: Indonesia
- Sport: Track and field
Medal record
Women's athletics
Representing Indonesia
Asian Indoor Championships
Bronze medal – third place	2023 Astana	Shot put
Islamic Solidarity Games
Gold medal – first place	2013 Palembang	Javelin throw
Silver medal – second place	2013 Palembang	Shot put
Bronze medal – third place	2021 Konya	Shot put
SEA Games
Gold medal – first place	2017 Kuala Lumpur	Shot put
Gold medal – first place	2021 Vietnam	Shot put
Silver medal – second place	2019 Philippines	Shot put
Silver medal – second place	2023 Cambodia	Shot put
ASEAN University Games
Gold medal – first place	2014 Palembang	Shot put
Silver medal – second place	2012 Vientiane	Shot put

Eki Febri Ekawati (born 18 February 1992) is an Indonesian athlete. She won bronze medal in shot put event in 2021 Islamic Solidarity Games.

== Career ==
Eki Febri Ekawati gained her first international experience at the SEA Games 2011 in Palembang, where she finished sixth with 13.08m. In 2013 she won the gold medal in the javelin throw at the Islamic Solidarity Games with 34.37 m and silver with the ball with 14.00 m behind the Iranian Leila Rajabi . Later in 2017, she won the gold medal at the SEA Games in Kuala Lumpur with 15.39m. In 2018, she finished seventh at the Asian Games in Jakarta with 14.61m. The following year, she also finished seventh at the Asian Championships in Doha with 14.94m and in December she won the SEA Games in Capas with 15.08m the silver medal behind the Thai Areerat Intadis. In 2021 she improved the national record to 15.77m and the following year she won the SEA Games in Hanoi with 15.20m.

Ekawati was Indonesia's shot put champion in 2013, 2017 and 2019.
