= Pavithra Vengatesh =

Indian athlete (born 2001)

Personal information
- Full name: Pavithra Vengatesh
- Nationality: India
- Born: 8 December 2001 (age 24) Tamil Nadu, India

Sport
- Country: India
- Sport: Track and field
- Event: Pole vault

Achievements and titles
- Personal best: 4.10 m (2022)
Medal record
Women's athletics
Representing India
Asian Indoor Athletics Championships
Silver medal – second place	2023 Astana	Pole vault

Pavithra Vengatesh (also Venkatesh, born 8 December 2001) is an Indian athlete from Tamil Nadu. She represents India in the pole vault event. She is part of the Indian team for the Asian Games at Hangzhou, China. Pavithra's personal best is 4.10m. The national record of 4.15m stands in the name of V S Surekha set in 2014.

== Early life ==
She comes from a poor family. Her father is a daily wage worker in Salem and her mother is a home maker. She has two siblings, a sister and a brother. She went to Sarada Vidyalaya Girls’ Higher Secondary School. Now she is studying final-year BA (English Honours) at AVS College of Arts And Science, Salem. For the last ten years she is training under Sports Development of Tamil Nadu coach K Elamparithi. She started at the age of 9 years as sprinter and long jumper, and also did 400m. Later in 2013, she decided to shift to pole vault. In August 2022, she secured a job in the sports quota and was employed by Southern Railways.

== Career ==
- 2023: In February, she made her international debut and won silver in the Asian Indoor Championships at Astana, Kazakhstan clearing 4 metres.
- 2022: She represented Tamil Nadu's Periyar University in the Khelo India University Games at Bengaluru. She became the fifth woman athlete to clear 4.00 metres when she cleared 4.01m in the pole vault event on the first day of the games.
- 2022: She set the all India inter-University (AIU) record of 4m at the 81st All India Inter University Women's Athletics Championships at Bhubaneswar, Odisha.
- 2021: In September, she won the gold in the 60th National Open athletics meet at Jawaharlal Nehru Stadium, Warangal. Telangana State.
- 2021: Won gold at the South Zone Junior athletics meet.
- 2018: Gold medal in Khelo India Youth Games.
- 2019: Gold medal in Khelo India Youth Games.
