= Masbah Ahmmed =

Bangladeshi sprinter

Personal information
- Nationality: Bangladeshi
- Born: 11 March 1995 (age 31) Bagerhat, Bangladesh
- Height: 1.74 m (5 ft 9 in)
- Weight: 57 kg (126 lb)

Sport
- Sport: Athletics
- Event: 100 m
- Coached by: Mohamed Shah Alam

Masbah Ahmmed (Bengali: মেজবাহ আহমেদ; born 11 March 1995) is a Bangladeshi sprinter. He competed in the 100 metres event at the 2013 World Championships in Athletics.
