= Bangladesh Athletics Federation =

Governing body of athletics in Bangladesh

- বাংলাদেশ অ্যাথলেটিক্স ফেডারেশন
- Sport: Athletics
- Abbreviation: BAF
- Founded: 1972
- Affiliation: World Athletics
- Regional affiliation: Asian Athletics Association (AAA)
- Headquarters: Dhaka, Bangladesh

Official website
- baf.org.bd/en
- (Bangladesh)

Bangladesh Athletics Federation (Bengali: বাংলাদেশ অ্যাথলেটিক্স ফেডারেশন) is the national federation for athletics and is responsible for governing the sport in Bangladesh. Former Assistant Attorney General and Veteran Athlete Advocate Abdur Rokib Mantu is the General Secretary of the Bangladesh Athletics Federation. Former secretary to the Ministry of Public Administration and Communication ASM Ali Kabir was the president of the Federation until his death on January 10, 2022, and was succeeded by the prime minister's principal secretary Tofazzal Hossain Miah.

== History ==
Bangladesh Athletics Federation was established in 1972 after the independence of Bangladesh by the Sheikh Mujibur Rahman cabinet. The Federation holds practices at the Bangabandhu National Stadium. The tracks on the stadium were damaged and in 2020, events were held in Chittagong due to the damage at Bangabandhu National Stadium.

== List of the records of Bangladeshi athletes in Athletics ==
List of Bangladeshi records in athletics
