= Shirin Akter =

Bangladeshi sprinter

Personal information
- Nationality: Bangladeshi
- Born: 12 October 1994 (age 31) Satkhira, Bangladesh
- Education: University of Rajshahi
- Height: 1.58 m (5 ft 2 in)
- Weight: 53 kg (117 lb)

Sport
- Country: Bangladesh
- Sport: Athletics
- Coached by: Mohamed Shah Alam

Shirin Akter (born 12 October 1994) is a Bangladeshi female sprinter.

She competed at the 2016 Summer Olympics in Rio de Janeiro, in the women's 100 metres.
