= Imranur Rahman =

Bangladeshi sprinter (born 1993)

Personal information
- Nationality: British-Bangladeshi
- Born: 5 July 1993 (age 33) Sheffield, United Kingdom
- Education: MS, Accounting & Finance; BS, Sports Studies; Sheffield Hallam University; University of Birmingham
- Height: 1.70 m (5 ft 7 in)

Sport
- Sport: Sprint
- Events: 100 m, 60 m

Achievements and titles
- Personal bests: 100 m: 10.11 NR (2023); 60 m: 6.59 NR (2023)
Medal record
Men's athletics
Representing Bangladesh
Asian Indoor Championships
Gold medal – first place	2023 Astana	60m

Imranur Rahman (born 5 July 1993) is a British-Bangladeshi sprinter who specializes in 100 m and 60 m events. He medalled gold at the 2023 Asian Indoor Championships in the men's 60 m dash with a time of 6.59, setting a national record. Rahman represented Bangladesh in the men's 100 m event at the 2024 Paris Olympics.
