= Park Si-hoon =

South Korean athlete (born 2007)

Personal information
- Born: 20 February 2007 (age 19)

Sport
- Sport: Athletics
- Event: Shot put
Medal record
Men's athletics
Representing South Korea
World U20 Championships
Silver medal – second place	2026 Eugene	Shot put
Asian U20 Championships
Gold medal – first place	2026 Hong Kong	Shot put
Silver medal – second place	2024 Dubai	Shot put
Bronze medal – third place	2023 Yecheon	Shot put
Asian U18 Championships
Gold medal – first place	2023 Tashkent	Shot put

Park Si-hoon (born 20 February 2007) is a South Korean shot putter. In 2026, he became the Asian under-20 record holder and won the silver medal at the 2026 World U20 Championships.

== Biography ==
From Gumi, his father, was an amateur weightlifter and his mother a schoolteacher. Park set national age-group records across elementary, middle, and high school divisions. He won the gold medal at the 2023 Asian U18 Athletics Championships in Tashkent, when he was 16 years-old, breaking the meet record with a put of 20.11 metres. Park won a silver medal at the 2024 Asian U20 Athletics Championships in Dubai the following year.

Competing at the 80th National Track and Field Championships in May 2026, he set the second-best all-time South Korean record for men with the 7.26kg shot put, with 19.10 metres. Later that month, he also became the Asian under-20 record holder with 20.65m as he won the 2026 Asian U20 Athletics Championships in Hong Kong with the 6kg implement, breaking the 20.63m record set by Li Meng of China in 2011 as well as the championship record held by Qatar’s Khalid Habash Al Suwaidi since 2002. On 5 August 2026, he won the silver medal in the shot put final behind Alessandro Borges of Brazil at the 2026 World Athletics U20 Championships in Eugene, United States having made a best distance of 20.31m metres. It was the second South Korean silver medal ever won at the championships, and the first medal of any colour for South Korea for 12 years, after Woo Sang-hyeok. He also became the first-ever South Korean shot putter to do so.
