= Shahnavaz Khan =

Indian long jumper (born 2008)

Personal information
- Born: 2 February 2008 (age 18) Madhaipur, Uttar Pradesh, India
- Military career
- Branch: Indian Navy
- Rank: Petty officer

Sport
- Sport: Athletics
- Event: Long jump

Achievements and titles
- Personal bests: 8.30 m NU20R (Bhubaneswar, 2026)
Medal record
Men's athletics
Representing India
World U20 Championships
Bronze medal – third place	2026 Eugene	Long jump
Asian U20 Championships
Gold medal – first place	2026 Hong Kong	Long jump

Shahnavaz Khan (born 2 February 2008) is an Indian long jumper. He won the bronze medal at the 2026 World U20 Championships and the gold medal at the 2026 Asian U20 Championships.

== Early life ==
Khan was born on 2 February 2008 in Madhaipur village in Pratapgarh district, Uttar Pradesh. His father, a taxi driver, died of cancer when he was 10 years old. He was inspired to take up athletics by his uncles. His uncle, Shahrukh, was a National Games champion in the 3000 m steeplechase, while another uncle, Mohammad Hadees, was a former national-level javelin thrower representing the Indian Army. Hadees would take him running and exercising along the banks of the river near their village. Khan was initially interested in javelin throw, shot put and decathlon but ended up pursuing long jump seriously. He is a student of Pillai University. He joined the Indian Navy through the sports quota and currently serves as a Petty officer.

== Career ==
Khan made his international debut at the 2024 Asian U20 Championships in Dubai, where he finished fifth with a jump of 7.39 m.

At the 2026 Asian Indoor Championships in Tianjin, jumping 7.70 m he narrowly missed the podium with a fourth-place finish. Later at the 2026 Asian U20 Championships in Hong Kong, he won the gold medal with a best effort of 7.84 m. He registered a jump of 8.30 m at the 2026 National Inter-State Championships in Bhubaneswar, setting a new national U20 record and surpassing the previous mark of 8.10 m set by Murali Sreeshankar in 2018. At the 2026 World U20 Championships in Eugene, he won the bronze medal with a jump of 7.84 m, becoming the first Indian male long jumper to win a medal at the championships. He was dropped from India's 2026 Asian Games athletics team due to an injury.

== International competitions ==
Representing India
Year	Competition	Host	Position	Result
2024	Asian U20 Championships	Dubai, UAE	5th	7.39 m
2026	Asian Indoor Championships	Tianjin, China	4th	7.70 m
2026	Asian U20 Championships	Hong Kong, China	1st	7.84 m
2026	World U20 Championships	Eugene, USA	3rd	7.84 m
