= Caren Chepchirchir =

Kenyan middle-distance runner

Personal information
- Born: 25 December 2008 (age 17)

Sport
- Sport: Athletics
- Event: Middle-distance running
Medal record
Women's athletics
Representing Kenya
World U20 Championships
Bronze medal – third place	2026 Eugene	1500 m
African U18 Championships
Gold medal – first place	2025 Abeokuta	1500m

Caren Chepchirchir (born 25 December 2008) is a Kenyan middle-distance runner.

== Biography ==
Chepchirchir attended Bishop Louis High school in Laikipia County. She won the gold medal over 1500 metres at the 2025 African U18 Championships in Abeokuta, Nigeria.

Chepchirchir ran a personal best 4:03.91 for the 1500 metres at the 2026 Meeting International Mohammed VI d'Athlétisme de Rabat in May 2026. She was selected to represent her country at the 2026 World Athletics U20 Championships, and advanced from the preliminary heats to the finals, winning her heat in 4:12.09. On 9 August, she won the bronze medal in the final of the 1500 metres behind gold medal-winning compatriot Josephine Sembeyo Mancha, and edged out on the finish line a diving Claire Stegall of the United States.

On 14 November, she won the Sparkassen Cross Pforzheim in Germany, a Gold meeting on the 2026-27 World Athletics Cross Country Tour. She won ahead of Francine Niyomukunzi in the first major cross-country race of her career, at the age of 17 years-old.
