= Oumar Doudai Abakar =

Qatari athlete (born 2005)

Personal information
- Nationality: Qatari
- Born: 1 January 2005 (age 21)

Sport
- Sport: Athletics
- Event: Hurdles

Achievements and titles
- Personal bests: 60m hurdles: 7.66 (2025) NR; 110m hurdles: 13.37 (2025) NR
Medal record
Men's athletics
Representing Qatar
Asian Championships
Bronze medal – third place	2023 Bangkok	4×400 m relay
Asian U20 Championships
Gold medal – first place	2024 Dubai	110m hurdles
Silver medal – second place	2023 Yecheon	110m hurdles

Oumar Doudai Abakar (born 1 January 2005) is a Qatari hurdler. He is the national record holder over 110 metres hurdles and 60 metres hurdles.

== Biography ==
He was a silver medalist in the 110m hurdles at both the 2023 Asian U20 Athletics Championships. He won a bronze medal with the Qatari 4 x 400 metres relay team at the 2023 Asian Championships.

He won the gold medal at the 2024 Asian U20 Athletics Championships in a championship record time. He competed at the 2024 World Athletics U20 Championships in Lima, Peru. He ended 2024 as the sixth fastest under-20 athlete over 110m hurdles.

He competed in the 60 metres hurdles at the 2025 World Athletics Indoor Championships in Nanjing where he set a new national record of 7.66 seconds whilst placing fourth in his semi-final. He finished sixth in the 110m hurdles in May 2025 at the 2025 Doha Diamond League. He set a new Qatari national record of 13.37 seconds for the 100 metres hurdles in Berlin in July 2025. He competed at the 2025 World Athletics Championships in the men's 110 metres hurdles in Tokyo, Japan, in September 2025.

Competing in July 2026, he won the bronze medal in the 100 m hurdles at the inaugural Asian U23 Athletics Championships held in Ordos, China.

== Personal life ==
His brother Ismail Abakar is also a hurdler.
