= 2026 World Athletics U20 Championships – Women's 1500 metres =

Women's 1500 metres at the 2026 World Athletics U20 Championships
- Venue: Hayward Field
- Dates: 6 August (Round 1); 9 August (Final)
- Competitors: 42
- Winning time: 4:16.73

Medalists
gold medal	Josephine Sembeyo Mancha	Kenya
silver medal	Claire Stegall	United States
bronze medal	Caren Chepchirchir	Kenya

The women's 1500 metres at the 2026 World Athletics U20 Championships was held at Hayward Field in Eugene, United States on 6 and 9 August 2026.

== Records ==
U20 standing records prior to the 2026 World Athletics U20 Championships were as follows:

Record	Athlete & Nationality	Mark	Location	Date
World U20 Record	Lang Yinglai (CHN)	3:51.34	Shanghai, China	18 October 1997
Championship Record	Brenda Chebet (KEN)	4:04.64	Cali, Colombia	6 August 2022
World U20 Leading	Haregeweyni Kalayu (ETH)	3:59.28	Rabat, Morocco	31 May 2026

== Results ==
=== Round 1 ===
Round 1 took place in the afternoon session on 6 August 2026. The first 5 in each heat (Q) advanced to the final.

==== Heat 1 ====
Place	Athlete	Nation	Time	Notes
1	Caren Chepchirchir	Kenya	4:12.09	Q
2	Claire Stegall	United States	4:13.09	Q
3	Mariana Moreira	Portugal	4:14.07	Q, PB
4	Lera Miller	Germany	4:14.40	Q
5	Kida Miori	Japan	4:15.56	Q, PB
6	Mia Jade Gray	Australia	4:15.85	PB
7	Claudia Gutierrez	Spain	4:17.96	
8	Allison Wasson	Canada	4:19.09	PB
9	Baskaline Cherotwo	Uganda	4:21.01	
10	Lara Stander	South Africa	4:21.67	
11	Mireya Bugeja	Malta	4:25.04	
12	Song Dawon	South Korea	4:26.54	
13	Gemma Galvin	Ireland	4:32.24	
14	Zara Pomfret	New Zealand	4:34.02	

==== Heat 2 ====
Place	Athlete	Nation	Time	Notes
1	Josephine Sembeyo Mancha	Kenya	4:12.21	Q
2	Haregeweyni Kalayu	Ethiopia	4:12.54	Q
3	Saida El-Bouzy	Morocco	4:13.13	Q
4	Wilma Bekkemoen Torbiörnsson	Norway	4:16.43	Q
5	Paula Terhorst	Germany	4:17.18	Q
6	Giulia Colarieti	Italy	4:17.77	PB
7	Oksana Pestka	Poland	4:18.22	
8	Tina Capol	Switzerland	4:20.96	PB
9	Raiya Matonovich	Canada	4:21.44	
10	Sára Fekete	Hungary	4:24.34	
11	Lenuta Constantin	Romania	4:25.17	
12	Pauline Schedler	Austria	4:27.29	
13	Ebba-Stina Bjuve	Sweden	4:27.58	
14	Amelie Njoki Šulc	Slovenia	4:39.29	

==== Heat 3 ====
Place	Athlete	Nation	Time	Notes
1	Elsabet Amare	Ethiopia	4:18.24	Q
2	Ellery Lincoln	United States	4:19.06	Q
3	Milla Roberts	Australia	4:19.55	Q
4	Lyla Belshaw	Great Britain	4:20.19	Q
5	Sherry Drury	Japan	4:20.20	Q
6	Scarlett Robb	New Zealand	4:22.28	
7	Cassandra Gouttefarde	Switzerland	4:22.33	PB
8	Chaimae Zahiri	Morocco	4:25.87	
9	Andrea Steynberg	South Africa	4:26.33	
10	Felister Chekwemoi	Uganda	4:26.70	
11	Ana Vita Verneker	Slovenia	4:28.16	
12	Margherita Vedovato	Italy	4:29.64	
13	Szonja Domokos	Hungary	4:35.61	
—	Noora Shihab Ahmad Kuran	Jordan	DNF	

=== Final ===
The final took place in the afternoon session on 9 August 2026.

Place	Athlete	Nation	Time	Notes
1st place, gold medalist(s)	Josephine Sembeyo Mancha	Kenya	4:16.73	
2nd place, silver medalist(s)	Claire Stegall	United States	4:16.77	
3rd place, bronze medalist(s)	Caren Chepchirchir	Kenya	4:17.50	
4	Elsabet Amare	Ethiopia	4:19.83	
5	Ellery Lincoln	United States	4:22.60	
6	Lera Miller	Germany	4:23.05	
7	Mariana Moreira	Portugal	4:23.12	
8	Lyla Belshaw	Great Britain	4:23.49	
9	Haregeweyni Kalayu	Ethiopia	4:24.48	
10	Saida El-Bouzy	Morocco	4:24.74	
11	Kida Miori	Japan	4:25.19	
12	Paula Terhorst	Germany	4:25.45	
13	Wilma Bekkemoen Torbiörnsson	Norway	4:27.77	
14	Milla Roberts	Australia	4:29.35	
15	Sherry Drury	Japan	4:29.70	
