= Luka Bošković =

Serbian long jumper (born 2006)

Personal information
- Born: 6 July 2006 (age 20)

Sport
- Sport: Athletics
- Event: Long jump

Achievements and titles
- Personal best: Long jump: 8.23 m (2026)
Medal record
Men's athletics
Representing Serbia
World U20 Championships
Silver medal – second place	2024 Lima	Long jump
European U20 Championships
Bronze medal – third place	2025 Tampere	Long jump

Luka Bošković (born 6 July 2006) is a Serbian long jumper. He won the silver medal at the 2024 World Athletics U20 Championships, and has won senior Serbian national titles both outdoors and indoors.

== Biography ==
In June 2024, Bošković won the senior long jump title at the Serbian Athletics Championships in Kraljevo, with a wind-assisted 7.99 metres (+2.1 m/s). He won the silver medal at the 2024 World Athletics U20 Championships in Lima, Peru with a jump of 7.93 metres to finish runner-up to Roko Farkas.

At the 2025 European Athletics U20 Championships in Tampere, Finland, Bošković won the bronze medal behind Petr Meindlschmid and Daniele Inzoli with Boškovic and Inzoli both jumping 7.69m but with Inzoli taking silver by virtue of a superior second best jump.

In February 2026, Bošković won the long jump title at the Serbian Indoor Athletics Championships in Belgrade. In June 2026, Boskovic set a new lifetime best of 8.14m in the long jump in Kraljevo, Serbia, before jumping a new personal best of 8.19m (-0.4 m/s) in the final round of the 2026 Balkan Athletics Championships in Volos, Greece, to win the silver medal behind Miltiadis Tentoglou and ahead of Bozhidar Sarâboyukov. Competing at the Boris Hanzekovic Memorial in Zagreb, a World Athletics Continental Tour Gold meeting, on 26 June, he improved his personal best to 8.23m in the long jump to finish second behind Anvar Anvarov. On 11 August, Boškovic placed fifth with a jump of 8.08 m in the final of the long jump at the 2026 European Athletics Championships in Birmingham. Competing at the 2026 Athletissima in Lausanne on 21 August, he placed third overall with a jump of 8.07 metres.
