= Su Chun-yueh =

Taiwanese high jumper

Personal information
- Full name: 蘇 瓊月, Pinyin: Sū Qióng-yuè
- Nationality: Taiwanese
- Born: 27 October 1970 (age 55)

Sport
- Sport: Athletics
- Event: High jump
Medal record
Women's athletics
Representing Chinese Taipei
Asian U20 Championships
Gold medal – first place	1986 Jakarta	High jump
Silver medal – second place	1988 Singapore	High jump
Asian Championships
Bronze medal – third place	1989 New Delhi	High jump

Su Chun-yueh (Chinese: 蘇瓊月; born 27 October 1970) is a Taiwanese high jumper. She won the bronze medal at the 1989 Asian Athletics Championships and competed in the women's high jump at the 1988 Summer Olympics.

== Career ==
Su won gold medals at the 1986 and 1988 Asian U20 Athletics Championships, and a bronze medal at the 1989 Asian Athletics Championships.

She finished 23rd in qualification at the 1988 Olympics, jumping 1.80 m. She was the Chinese Taipei record holder in the high jump.

== Personal life ==
Su attended Dajia High School along with her family. She was said to have established a legacy in the high jump. She married fellow high jumper Zhuo Yuquan (Chinese: 卓玉泉). Her sister Su Qiongmei (Chinese: 蘇瓊媚) was a former combined athletics events competitor. She had a son, Jia-Xuan Zhuo, who became a prominent decathlete who scored 7317 points in 2023.
