= 1986 Asian Junior Athletics Championships =

1st Asian Junior Championships
- Dates: 4 – 7 December
- Host city: Jakarta, Indonesia
- Level: Junior (under-20)
- Events: 40

The 1986 Asian Junior Athletics Championships was the inaugural edition of the international athletics competition for Asian under-20 athletes, organised by the Asian Athletics Association. It took place from 4–7 December in Jakarta, Indonesia. A total of 40 events were contested, 22 for male athletes and 18 for female athletes.

== Medal summary ==
=== Men ===
Event	Gold		Silver		Bronze	
100 metres (Wind: +0.9 m/s)	Li Tao (CHN)	10.26	Wang Wenzhong (CHN)	10.47	Mardi Lestari (INA)	10.53
200 metres (Wind: +2.2 m/s)	Hsieh Tsong-Tze (TPE)	21.21 w	Li Yun (CHN)	21.48 w	Tsai Yi-Cheng (TPE)	21.48 w
400 metres	Keiichi Adachi (JPN)	47.54	Muhammad Fayyaz (PAK)	47.78	Mohamed Hossain Milzer (BAN)	48.02
800 metres	Ismail Yousef (QAT)	1:52.15	Mohamed Hossain Milzer (BAN)	1:52.16	Keiichiro Nakamura (JPN)	1:52.63
1500 metres	Duan Xiuquan (CHN)	3:47.06	Mohamed Suleiman (QAT)	3:48.91	Atsushi Ogino (JPN)	3:49.18
5000 metres	Ryu Ok-Hyon (PRK)	14:26.15	Guo Yijiang (CHN)	14:30.51	Jun Hiratsuka (JPN)	14:32.86
10,000 metres	Ryu Ok-Hyon (PRK)	30:00.27	Edward Nabunone (INA)	30:06.33	Guo Yijiang (CHN)	31:39.73
110 metres hurdles	Hiroshi Kakimori (JPN)	14.28	Rashid Sheban Marzouk (QAT)	14.33	Shaheed Mahmoud (PAK)	14.71
400 metres hurdles	Hiroshi Kakimori (JPN)	51.37	Shaheed Mahmoud (PAK)	53.36	Hamdi Jaafar (MAS)	53.52
2000 metres steeplechase	Ali Ahmed Saleh (QAT)	5:52.69	Abdullah Al-Dosari (BHR)	6:00.23	Gau Jing-Jing (TPE)	6:06.05
4 × 100 m relay	China (CHN); Wang Wenzhong; Sun Jinchang; Li Jun; Li Tao	40.01	Japan (JPN); Tomohiro Osawa; Nobuo Toyoda; Masahito Horiuchi; Shinji Aoto	40.46	Chinese Taipei (TPE); Wu Yu-Mai; Hsieh Tsong-Tze; Tsai Yi-Cheng; Jin Liang-Yen	40.62
4 × 400 m relay	Japan (JPN)	3:10.30	Pakistan (PAK)	3:10.45	Chinese Taipei (TPE)	3:11.39
10,000 metres walk	Huang Youngge (CHN)	45:34.62	Kaswoto (INA)	50:58.87	Subramanian Thanigasalam (SIN)	54:01.06
High jump	Ni Tao (CHN)	2.15 m	Toshio Adachi (JPN)	2.12 m	Cao Yang (CHN)	2.09 m
Pole vault	Huang Weiping (CHN)	4.90 m	Vijay Pal Singh (IND)	4.80 m	Foo Cheul-Hay (KOR)	4.80 m
Long jump	Nobuo Toyoda (JPN)	7.93 m	Kim Won-jin (KOR)	7.85 m	Li Tong (CHN)	7.70 m
Triple jump	Du Benzhong (CHN)	15.83 m	Nai Hui-fang (TPE)	15.13 m	Katsumi Sazanami (JPN)	15.06 m
Shot put	Cui Guangyuan (CHN)	16.21 m	Kim Ki-Sang (KOR)	15.23 m	Mahmoud Mustapha Jalal (KUW)	14.90 m
Discus throw	Wu Guang (CHN)	48.00 m	Lin Hua-Hsuing (TPE)	45.96 m	Bhajan Singh (IND)	43.00 m
Hammer throw	Kazuhiro Asami (JPN)	59.21 m	Bader Al-Rashoud (KUW)	50.61 m	Rashid Riyadh (BHR)	49.57 m
Javelin throw	Kim Jae-Sang (KOR)	75.40 m	Geng Shengli (CHN)	67.92 m	Gou Jin-Chuan (TPE)	64.96 m
Decathlon	Peng Huang-Shu (TPE)	6667 pts	Huang Chiang-Feng (TPE)	6237 pts	Kim Kwang-Ik (KOR)	6129 pts

=== Women ===
Event	Gold		Silver		Bronze	
100 metres	Ayako Nomura (JPN)	12.03	Sin Yong-An (KOR)	12.12	Qi Hong (CHN)	12.13
200 metres	Shigeko Ito (JPN)	24.52	Ayako Nomura (JPN)	24.79	Sin Yong-An (KOR)	24.82
400 metres	Huang Xiuxia (CHN)	55.76	Keiko Honda (JPN)	56.85	Hsu Hsiu-Feng (TPE)	58.16
800 metres	Hye Soon-Ho (KOR)	2:09.87	Xu Liun (CHN)	2:10.82	Takaro Torii (JPN)	2:10.85
1500 metres	Kim Song-Hwa (PRK)	4:28.34	Kim Wei-Ja (KOR)	4:28.48	No Hae-Son (KOR)	4:29.78
3000 metres	Kim Chun-Mae (PRK)	9:46.42	Kim Song-Hwa (PRK)	9:48.66	Kim Wei-Ja (KOR)	9:52.75
5000 metres	Kim Chun-Mae (PRK)	17:01.13	An Chang-Ju (PRK)	17:46.82	Betty Sarmiyati (INA)	17:56.27
100 metres hurdles	Naomi Jojima (JPN)	13.81	Du Juan (CHN)	13.86	Wang Shu-Hua (TPE)	14.17
400 metres hurdles	Chen Bairu (CHN)	59.54	Chang Feng-Hua (TPE)	61.17	Dolly Joseph (IND)	63.08
4 × 100 m relay	Chinese Taipei (TPE); Lin Shu-Feng; Chang Feng-Hua; Chen Ya-Li; Wang Shu-Hua	46.89	China (CHN); Qi Hong; Huang Xiuxia; Du Juan; Lu Zhongying	46.92	Japan (JPN); Sanao Someya; Naomi Yojima; Shigeko Ito; Ayako Nomura	47.12
4 × 400 m relay	Chinese Taipei (TPE)	3:46.62	Japan (JPN)	3:47.81	China (CHN)	3:47.87
5000 metres walk	Li Chunxiu (CHN)	25:26.22	Park Hyun-Joo (KOR)	26:44.65	Nurniaty (INA)	27:32.88
High jump	Su Chun-Yueh (TPE)	1.74 m	Liu Qian (CHN)	1.74 m	Gyeon Reu-Rim (KOR)	1.65 m
Long jump	Fan Li (CHN)	6.27 m	Wang Shu-Hua (TPE)	6.17 m	Ri Yong-Ae (PRK)	6.13 m
Shot put	Ma Seun-Chi (KOR)	14.61 m	Chong Chun-Hwa (PRK)	13.96 m	Ni Chia-Ping (TPE)	12.16 m
Discus throw	Kim Ni-Suk (KOR)	45.14 m	Kau Chuen-Mei (TPE)	42.08 m	Neelam Kumari (IND)	36.30 m
Javelin throw	Sun Xiurong (CHN)	60.74 m	Keiko Takeda (JPN)	53.86 m	Chen Yu-Jin (TPE)	45.14 m
Heptathlon	Wang Shu-Hua (TPE)	5402 pts	Hsu Huei-Ying (TPE)	5108 pts	Miharu Kobayashi (JPN)	5020 pts

== 1986 Medal Table ==
Rank	Nation	Gold	Silver	Bronze	Total
1	China (CHN)	14	8	5	27
2	Japan (JPN)	9	6	7	22
3	Chinese Taipei (TPE)	6	7	9	22
4	North Korea (PRK)	5	3	1	9
5	South Korea (KOR)	4	5	6	15
6	Qatar (QAT)	2	2	0	4
7	Pakistan (PAK)	0	3	1	4
8	Indonesia (INA)	0	2	3	5
9	India (IND)	0	1	3	4
10	Bahrain (BHR)	0	1	1	2
10	Bangladesh (BAN)	0	1	1	2
10	Kuwait (KUW)	0	1	1	2
13	Malaysia (MAS)	0	0	1	1
13	Singapore (SIN)	0	0	1	1
Totals (14 entries)		40	40	40	120
