= Asahi Kuroda =

Japanese athlete (born 2004)

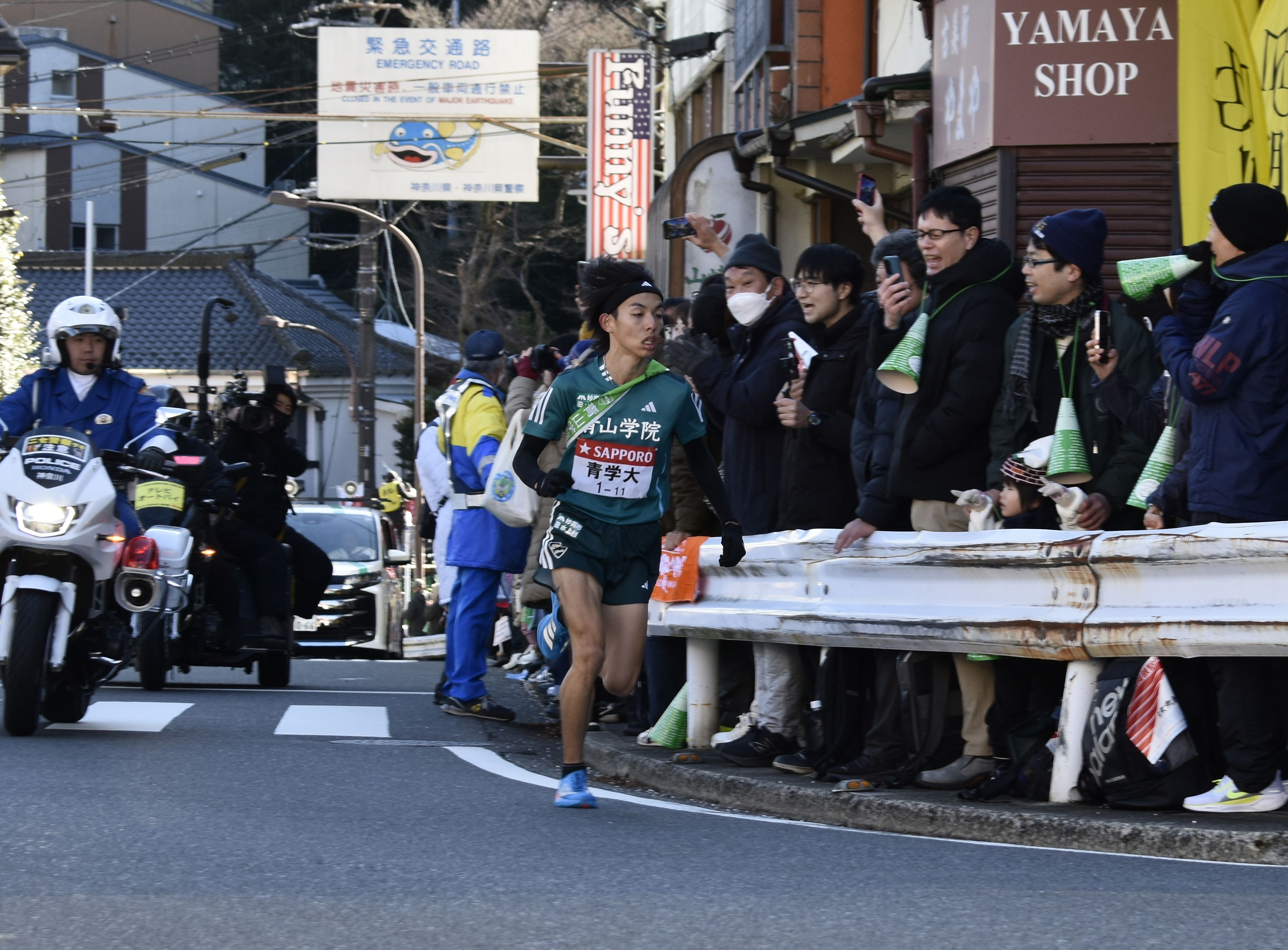
- At the 2026 Hakone Ekiden

Personal information
- Born: 10 March 2004 (age 22)

Sport
- Sport: Athletics
- Event: Long-distance running

Achievements and titles
- Personal best(s): 5000m: 13:29.56 (Yokohama, 2024); 10,000m:27:52.02 (Tokyo, 2024); 3000m S'chase: 8:35.10 (Kobe, 2024); Road; 5km: 13:53 (Herzogenaurach, 2025); Half marathon 1:01:39 (Marugame, 2024); Marathon: 2:06:05 (Osaka, 2025)
Medal record
Men's athletics
Representing Japan
Asian U20 Championships
Gold medal – first place	2023 Yecheon	3000m Steeplechase

Asahi Kuroda (born 10 March 2004) is a Japanese long-distance runner and steeplechaser. A gold medalist in the steeplechase at the 2023 Asian U20 Athletics Championships, his time of 2:06:05 for the marathon in 2025 was a Japanese college record.

== Career ==
Kuroda studies at Aoyama Gakuin University. As a sophomore in 2023, he won the second leg of the Izumo Ekiden and ran the All-Japan University Men’s Ekiden. Kuroda won the gold medal in the 3000 metres steeplechase at the 2023 Asian U20 Athletics Championships in Yecheon, South Korea.

In February 2025, he took two seconds off Hiroki Wakabayashi Japanese collegiate record in the marathon, running 2:06:05 at the Osaka Marathon at the age of 20 years-old.

In January 2026, competing at the Hakone Ekiden for two-time defending champions Aoyama Gakuin University, Kuroda ran 1:07:16 for the fifth leg, running 1:55 under the course record set by Hiroki Wakabayash the previous year. After Aoyama Gakuin won the overall race, he was awarded the Shizo Kanakuri Trophy as the most valuable runner in the race. He had also ran as part of the winning Aoyama Gakuin teams of 2024 and 2025.
