= 2026 World Athletics U20 Championships – Men's long jump =

Men's long jump at the 2026 World Athletics U20 Championships
- Venue: Hayward Field
- Dates: 7 August (Qualification); 8 August (Final)
- Competitors: 29 from 21 nations
- Winning distance: 7.97 m

Medalists
gold medal	Daniele Inzoli	Italy
silver medal	Mason McGroder	Australia
bronze medal	Shahnavaz Khan	India

The men's long jump at the 2026 World Athletics U20 Championships was held at Hayward Field in Eugene, United States on 7 and 8 August 2026.

== Records ==
U20 standing records prior to the 2026 World Athletics U20 Championships were as follows:

Record	Athlete & Nationality	Mark	Location	Date
World U20 Record	Mattia Furlani (ITA)	8.38 m	Rome, Italy	8 June 2024
World U20 Record	Jorge A. Hodelín (CUB)	8.46 m	Pierre-Bénite, France	13 June 2026
Championship Record	James Stallworth (USA)	8.20 m	Plovdiv, Bulgaria	9 August 1990
World U20 Leading	Jorge A. Hodelín (CUB)	8.46 m	Pierre-Bénite, France	13 June 2026

== Results ==
=== Qualification ===
Qualification took place in the morning session on 7 August 2026. Athletes attaining a mark of at least 7.75 metres (Q) or at least the 12 best performers (q) qualified for the final.

==== Group A ====
Place	Athlete	Nation	Round			Mark	Notes
Place	Athlete	Nation	#1	#2	#3	Mark	Notes
1	Daniele Inzoli	Italy	7.55 (+2.0 m/s)	8.15 (−0.7 m/s)		8.15 m (−0.7 m/s)	Q, PB
2	Quincy Isaac	United States	7.91 (+1.1 m/s)			7.91 m (+1.1 m/s)	Q, PB
3	Adam Bilokon	Ukraine	7.77 (+0.8 m/s)		-	7.77 m (+0.8 m/s)	Q, PB
4	Shahnavaz Khan	India	7.51 (+1.1 m/s)	x	7.73 (+1.7 m/s)	7.73 m (+1.7 m/s)	q
5	Arsenios Koulouris	Greece	7.60 (+0.6 m/s)	7.26 (+0.4 m/s)	7.35 (−0.6 m/s)	7.60 m (+0.6 m/s)	q
6	Daniel Emegbor	Great Britain	7.59 m (+1.6 m/s)	x	x	7.59 m (+1.6 m/s)	q
7	Jithin Arjunan	India	7.43 (+0.7 m/s)	7.43 (+2.4 m/s)	7.57 (+1.6 m/s)	7.57 m (+1.6 m/s)	q
8	Yunier Pérez	Spain	7.52 (+0.7 m/s)	x	x	7.52 m (+0.7 m/s)	
9	Jiang Zhen	China	x	7.33 (+1.5 m/s)	7.41 (−0.6 m/s)	7.41 m (−0.6 m/s)	
10	Botond Horváth	Hungary	6.84 (+0.8 m/s)	6.97 (+1.2 m/s)	7.10 (+1.6 m/s)	7.10 m (+1.6 m/s)	
11	Carter Reckelberg	United States	6.95 (+1.2 m/s)	6.85 (+1.6 m/s)	x	6.95 m (+1.2 m/s)	
12	Luke Vrataric	Australia	6.92 (+2.1 m/s)	-	-	6.92 m (+2.1 m/s)	
13	Remi Mourie	France	6.07 (+0.3 m/s)	x	x	6.07 m (+0.3 m/s)	
—	Tshiamo Motsamai	Japan	x	x	x	NM	

==== Group B ====
Place	Athlete	Nation	Round			Mark	Notes
Place	Athlete	Nation	#1	#2	#3	Mark	Notes
1	Mason McGroder	Australia	7.67 (+1.3 m/s)	7.83 (+1.8 m/s)		7.83 (+1.8 m/s)	Q, PB
2	Eito Omori	Japan	7.68 (+1.6 m/s)	7.57 (+2.4 m/s)		7.68 m (+1.6 m/s)	q
3	Vasileios Magouliotis	Greece	7.25 (−0.3 m/s)	7.67 (−0.1 m/s)	7.42 (+1.6 m/s)	7.67 m (−0.3 m/s)	q
4	Maidis Gorrillot	France	7.59 (+2.2 m/s)	7.42 (+0.8 m/s)	5.38 (+1.4 m/s)	7.59 m (+2.2 m/s)	q
5	Denis Marius Buzoiu	Romania	7.26 (+2.5 m/s)	7.39 (+2.4 m/s)	7.58 (+1.1 m/s)	7.58 m (+1.1 m/s)	q
6	Aritz Goñi	Spain	7.51 (+2.0 m/s)	7.07 (−0.3 m/s)	7.47 (−0.2 m/s)	7.51 m (+2.0 m/s)	
7	Carlin Archer	Bahamas	7.51 (+2.2 m/s)	5.49 (+1.4 m/s)	7.05 (−1.5 m/s)	7.51 m (+2.2 m/s)	
8	Levi Luke Fick	South Africa	7.22 (±0.0 m/s)	7.41 (+1.5 m/s)	7.28 (+1.4 m/s)	7.41 m (+1.5 m/s)	
9	Matic Modrijančič	Slovenia	7.40 (+0.6 m/s)	7.39 (+2.0 m/s)	x	7.40 m (+0.6 m/s)	
10	Yuan Lei	China	7.30 (+0.6 m/s)	x	x	7.30 m (+0.6 m/s)	
11	Jhon Valencia	Colombia	x	x	7.24 (+1.1 m/s)	7.24 m (+1.1 m/s)	
12	Yassine Sassi	Tunisia	x	7.16 (+1.5 m/s)	6.92 (+0.9 m/s)	7.16 m (+1.5 m/s)	
13	Issam Louadj	Algeria	7.09 (−0.9 m/s)	x	x	7.09 m (−0.9 m/s)	
14	Brajan Avia	Macedonia	x	7.04 (+1.1 m/s)	6.58 (+1.9 m/s)	7.04 m (+1.1 m/s)	
15	Noah Hasler	Switzerland	x	6.12 (+1.3 m/s)	r	6.12 m (+1.3 m/s)	

=== Final ===
The final took place in the morning session on 8 August 2026.

Place	Athlete	Nation	Round						Mark	Notes
Place	Athlete	Nation	#1	#2	#3	#4	#5	#6	Mark	Notes
1st place, gold medalist(s)	Daniele Inzoli	Italy	7.93 (+0.7 m/s)	7.97 (+0.7 m/s)	x	x	x	x	7.97 m (+0.7 m/s)	
2nd place, silver medalist(s)	Mason McGroder	Australia	7.69 (+1.6 m/s)	7.87 (+0.5 m/s)	7.94 (+1.2 m/s)	7.94 (+0.4 m/s)	7.80 (+0.1 m/s)	7.96 (+0.5 m/s)	7.96 m (+0.5 m/s)	PB
3rd place, bronze medalist(s)	Shahnavaz Khan	India	7.67 (+1.4 m/s)	7.72 (+1.1 m/s)	7.84 (+1.4 m/s)	7.52 (+0.6 m/s)	7.83 (+0.4 m/s)	5.37 (+0.1 m/s)	7.84 m (+1.4 m/s)	
4	Quincy Isaac	United States	7.56 (+0.2 m/s)	7.67 (+1.0 m/s)	7.54 (+1.0 m/s)	7.53 (+0.6 m/s)	7.79 (+0.8 m/s)	x	7.79 m (+0.8 m/s)	
5	Eito Omori	Japan	7.76 (+1.3 m/s)	7.60 (+0.8 m/s)	6.53 (+2.0 m/s)	7.52 (+0.7 m/s)	7.66 (+0.3 m/s)	7.70 (+0.8 m/s)	7.76 m (+1.3 m/s)	PB
6	Adam Bilokon	Ukraine	7.75 (+0.8 m/s)	x	x	x	x	3.64 (+0.8 m/s)	7.75 m (+0.8 m/s)	
7	Daniel Emegbor	Great Britain	x	x	7.50 (+1.3 m/s)	x	x	7.72 (+0.2 m/s)	7.72 m (+0.2 m/s)	
8	Jithin Arjunan	India	7.55 (+0.8 m/s)	7.46 (+2.5 m/s)	7.59 (+0.8 m/s)	x	7.17		7.59 m (+0.8 m/s)	
9	Arsenios Koulouris	Greece	x	7.42 (+1.6 m/s)	7.37 (+0.8 m/s)	x			7.42 m (+1.6 m/s)	
10	Denis Marius Buzoiu	Romania	x	x	7.42 (+1.6 m/s)	x			7.42 m (+1.6 m/s)	
11	Maidis Gorrillot	France	7.21 (±0.0 m/s)	7.40 (+1.5 m/s)	7.35 (+0.4 m/s)				7.40 m (+1.5 m/s)	
12	Vasileios Magouliotis	Greece	x	6.15 (+0.5 m/s)	6.97 (+0.9 m/s)				6.97 m (+0.9 m/s)	
