= Zacchaeus Brocks =

American hurdler (born 2008)

Personal information
- Born: 7 April 2008 (age 18)

Sport
- Sport: Athletics
- Event: Hurdles
Medal record
Men's athletics
Representing United States
World U20 Championships
Bronze medal – third place	2026 Eugene	110m hurdles

Zacchaeus Brocks (born 7 April 2008) is an American hurdler. In 2026, he became the first American high school athlete to run under-13 seconds for the 110 metres hurdles.

== Biography ==
From Michigan, he attended Detroit Catholic Central High School. After overcoming a stress fracture of his foot which ended his junior high school season early, in January 2026 Brocks competed in the 60 metres hurdles to tie for the fourth-fastest time by a high schooler, becoming the new Michigan state record holder with 7.57 seconds before later that year, lowering his best to 7.44 seconds. That year, he committed to attend Ohio State University to study engineering.

Competing in June 2026, he broke the American high school record for the 110 metres hurdles in the preliminary round for the USATF U20 Championships, surpassing the record held by Wayne Davis, running 13.00 seconds. Brocks later became the first American high schooler to run under 13 seconds for the event, running 12.98 seconds in the final to win ahead of Le'Ezra Brown. He was named the 2026 Gatorade National Boys Track and Field Player of the Year. Competing at the 2026 World Athletics U20 Championships in Eugene, he qualified for the final of the 110 m hurdles having won his heat in 13.11 seconds and running 13.00 in his semi-final. In the final he equalled his personal best of 12.98 seconds, winning the bronze medal behind Brown and Jeremy Koga of Japan.
