= 2026 Asian U20 Athletics Championships =

22nd Asian U20 Athletics Championships
- Dates: 28-31 May 2026
- Host city: Hong Kong
- Venue: Kai Tak Youth Sports Ground
- Level: Junior (under-20)
- Events: 45

The 2026 Asian U20 Athletics Championships is the 22nd edition of the international athletics competition for Asian under-20 athletes, organized by the Asian Athletics Association. Athletes born between 2007 and 2009 competed in 45 events, divided evenly between the sexes, and one mixed event. The competition took place over four days from the 28th to 31st of May at the Kai Tak Youth Sports Ground in Hong Kong.

The Asian Championship served as a qualifying tournament for 2026 World Athletics U20 Championships to be held in August at Eugene, Oregon, USA.

== Medal summary ==
=== Men ===
Event	Gold		Silver		Bronze	
100 metres (wind: +0.2 m/s)	Dai Hongyu; China	10.28	Kwok Chun Ting; Hong Kong	10.35 (10.346)	Tsubasa Yasukawa; Japan	10.35 (10.350)
200 metres (wind: -1.6 m/s)	Abdul Quddus Ahmed Ali; United Arab Emirates	20.85	Chen Jinxin; China	21.12	Sadew Rajakaruna; Sri Lanka	21.13
400 metres	Suleiman Abdulrahman; United Arab Emirates	44.85 CR NR	Khala Ngare Mahamat; Qatar	45.19	Youssouf Abdelaziz Djibrine; Qatar	45.58
800 metres	Venkatram Reddy Mogali; India	1:48.27	ND Liyanage Gagabada Liyanage; Sri Lanka	1:49.22	Atsuki Watanabe; Japan	1:49.29
1500 metres	Mubarik Abdi Said; Qatar	3:44.40	Chien Tzu–chieh; Chinese Taipei	3:45.58	Wang Jiahao; China	3:46.92
3000 metres	Mubarik Abdi Said; Qatar	7:56.08	Chien Tzu–chieh; Chinese Taipei	8:00.42	Yota Mashiko; Japan	8:00.86
5000 metres	Ryo Kurimura; Japan	14:39.31	Timur Nasimov; Uzbekistan	15:34.09	Tsagaadai Angar; Mongolia	15:37.38
110 metres hurdles (99 cm) (wind: -0.5 m/s)	Jeremy Koga; Japan	13.05 CR	Koki Takajo; Japan	13.24	Chen Yi-xuan; Chinese Taipei	13.46
400 metres hurdles	Taiju Goto; Japan	49.25 CR	Faycal Mahamat Abdallah; Qatar	50.54	Naif Rashid A Alsubaie; Saudi Arabia	51.08
3000 metres steeplechase	Nikhil Chandrashekar; India	9:25.44	Yuu Kato; Japan	9:27.30	Jerico Cadag; Philippines	9:35.10
4 × 100 metres relay	South Korea; Choi Myung-jin; Kim Dong-jin; Choi Seong-won; Jun Chae-min	39.75	Thailand; Thiraphat Anantarattanakun; Chutithat Pruksorranan; Phattarakorn Insaeng; Anucha Sa-gabankhok	39.83	Chinese Taipei; Lin Chia-le; Lyu Zong-han; Hsieh Cheng-kuei; Chung Chih-hsiang	39.86
4 × 400 metres relay	China; Ye Weixin; Li Yongjie; Yang Jia; Xu Xinlong	3:04.88 CR	Qatar; Mahamat Abdallah A Abdelsadick; Mohammed Musa A Musa; Samir Moussa Hassan; Youssouf Abdelaziz Djibrine	3:05.06	India; Piyush Raj; Sayed Sabeer; Ranjith Kumar S Mohammed Ashfaq	3:05.54
5,000 metres walk	Nitin Gupta; India	19:47.49	Lo Sheng-qin; Chinese Taipei	19:56.17	Chihiro Obata; Japan	20:06.73
High jump	Basant; India	2.20 m	Tharusha Mendis; Sri Lanka	2.14 m	Kim Jun-ki; South Korea	2.12 m
Pole vault	Zeng Liang; China	5.45 m	Naoya Inoue; Japan	5.40 m	Abdulla Saad; Qatar	5.20 m
Long jump	Shahnavaz Khan; India	7.84 m	Jithin Arjunan RC; India	7.66 m	Sarvar Meyliyev; Uzbekistan	7.60 m
Triple jump	Wang Zhuoyue; China	16.42 m	Cai Ziqi; China	16.03 m	Han Gye-ol; South Korea	15.59 m
Shot put (6 kg)	Park Si-hoon; South Korea	20.65 m CR AU20R	Wu Chenqi; China	18.75 m	Zayed Essam Albishi; Saudi Arabia	18.03 m
Discus throw (1.75 kg)	Maxim Sazhnev; Kazakhstan	60.45 m	Nishchay; India	60.10 m	Hamad Dhawi Alsultan; Qatar	59.47 m
Hammer throw (6 kg)	Wang Ankang; China	75.07 m	Abdelrahman Mohamed Ibrahim; Qatar	72.53 m	Andrew Atuobeng; Japan	70.64 m
Javelin throw	Ruslan Sadullaev; Uzbekistan	75.01 m	Leon Iwasaka; Japan	70.46 m	Jang Ha-jin; South Korea	70.31 m
Decathlon U20	Rahul Jakhar; India	7185 pts	Upkar; India	6854 pts	Askar Omirzak; Kazakhstan	6774 pts

=== Women ===
Event	Gold		Silver		Bronze	
100 metres (wind: +0.1 m/s)	Dana Noor Salem; Qatar	11.47	Chen Xinxuan; China	11.54	Nipam; India	11.62
200 metres (wind: -1.4 m/s)	DRR Pathirana Unnehelage; Sri Lanka	24.07 (24.062)	Zhenglin Zhou; China	24.07 (24.068)	Aarti; India	24.12
400 metres	Aminat Kamarudeen; United Arab Emirates	52.72	Chen Yi-cen; Chinese Taipei	53.16	Neeru Pathak; India	53.23
800 metres	Hanon Sasaki; Japan	2:05.44	Deng Yue; China	2:05.70	TA Pemasiri Mahadura Gedara; Sri Lanka	2:07.10
1500 metres	TA Pemasiri Mahadura Gedara; Sri Lanka	4:31.41	Maryam Ahmadi; Iran	4:33.35	Song Da-won; South Korea	4:35.42
3000 metres	Pan Shuanglu; China	9:36.02	Hanieh Shahpari; Iran	9:49.42	Dilnoza Hoshimova; Uzbekistan	10:29.72
5000 metres	Muskan; India	16:53.08	Kim Hyo-joo; South Korea	17:18.66	Sadafbonu Nusratilloeva; Uzbekistan	18:08.17
100 metres hurdles (wind: +0.4 m/s)	Zhang Keyi; China	13.38 CR	Nana Ishihara; Japan	13.76	Alina Golovina; Kazakhstan	13.93
400 metres hurdles	Mariam Kareem; United Arab Emirates	56.93	Liu Chen-yu; Chinese Taipei	59.46	Margarita Kossinova; Kazakhstan	1:01.06
3000 metres steeplechase	Rei Taya; Japan	10:22.52	Hanieh Shahpari; Iran	10:26.34	Sadafbonu Nusratilloeva; Uzbekistan	10:37.32
4 × 100 metres relay	China; Zhang Keyi; Zhou Zhenglin; Zhang Qian; Chen Xinxuan	44.78	India; Kajal Hirabhai Vaja; Bhavana G Aarti; Nipam	45.05	Chinese Taipei; Chen Yi-cen; Liu Chen-yu; Zhan Pei-rong; Su Yi-han	45.61
4 × 400 metres relay	India; Bhumika Sanjay Nehate; Tahura Khatun; Sehnoor Bawa; Neeru Pathak	3:38.07 CR	Kazakhstan; Milana Zubareva; Margarita Kossinova; Mariya Zinevich; Sofya Kidenko	3:43.63	Hong Kong; Cheng Tsz Yan; Lee Tsz Yiu; Jane Christa Ming Suet Karlsson; Chow Chi Kiu	3:49.94
5,000 metres walk	Sun Yuyao; China	23:42.10	Kwon Seor-hin; South Korea	23:48.20	Tang Lijia; China	24:28.04
High jump	Pooja Singh; India	1.93 m CR NR	Chen Meiqi; China	1.80 m	Lin Pei-hsuan; Chinese Taipei MDA Demalaporuwe Kankanamalage; Sri Lanka	1.72 m
Pole vault	Li Xiying; China	4.05 m	Anna Cherkashina; Kazakhstan	4.00 m	Saera Watanabe; Japan	3.80 m
Long jump	Liang Morong; China	6.05 m	Kim Soo-ji; South Korea	5.94 m	Yuhi Narisawa; Japan	5.93 m
Triple jump	Xie Yiqing; China	13.36 m	Sadhana Ravi; India	12.84 m	Mariya Chshipacheva; Kazakhstan	12.70 m
Shot put	He Yuxiao; China	15.30 m	Zhai Xiaohan; China	15.28 m	Lee Ye-ram; South Korea	14.65 m
Discus throw	Amanat Kamboj; India	52.24 m	Ma Chenyi; China	51.30 m	Koko Konda; Japan	49.74 m
Hammer throw	Chen Jiajun; China	65.46 m	Yang Chae-min; South Korea	57.62 m	Salma Haitham Rashid; United Arab Emirates	55.42 m
Javelin throw	Tai Yu-chin; Chinese Taipei	56.91 m	Ana Bhianca Espenilla; Philippines	52.20 m	Kim Min-ji; South Korea	51.51 m
Heptathlon	Lin Pei-hsuan; Chinese Taipei	4730 pts	He Wing Hei; Hong Kong	3102 pts	Only two athletics finished	

=== Mixed ===
Event	Gold		Silver		Bronze	
4 × 400 metres relay	United Arab Emirates; Saeed Shoaib Omar; Aminat Kamarudeen; Suleiman Abdulrahman; Mariam Kareem	3:18.81 CR	Chinese Taipei; Tsai Sin-you; Liu Chen-yu; Lyu Zong-han; Chen Yi-cen	3:23.92	Sri Lanka; SWR Senarath Mudiyanselage; WDW Sakra Pedige; OS Silva Jayathungalage; RMAP Dajahetti Muhamderamge	3:28.66

== Medal table ==
* Host nation (Hong Kong)

Rank	Nation	Gold	Silver	Bronze	Total
1	China	14	9	2	25
2	India	10	5	4	19
3	Japan	5	5	8	18
4	United Arab Emirates	5	0	1	6
5	Qatar	3	4	3	10
6	Chinese Taipei	2	6	4	12
7	South Korea	2	4	6	12
8	Sri Lanka	2	2	4	8
9	Kazakhstan	1	2	4	7
10	Uzbekistan	1	1	4	6
11	Iran	0	3	0	3
12	Hong Kong*	0	2	1	3
13	Philippines	0	1	1	2
14	Thailand	0	1	0	1
15	Saudi Arabia	0	0	2	2
16	Mongolia	0	0	1	1
Totals (16 entries)		45	45	45	135
