= Ismail Abakar =

Qatari athlete (born 2004)

Ismail Doudai Abakar
Personal information
- Nationality: Qatari
- Born: 1 January 2004 (age 22)

Sport
- Sport: Athletics
- Event: Hurdles

Achievements and titles
- Personal bests: 400 m: 45.85 (Potchefstroom, 2024); 400 m hurdles: 47.61 (Tokyo, 2025)
Medal record
Men's athletics
Representing Qatar
Asian Championships
Bronze medal – third place	2023 Bangkok	4 × 400 m relay
Asian Games
Silver medal – second place	2023 Hangzhou	4 × 400 m relay
Asian Indoor Championships
Gold medal – first place	2026 Tanjijn	4 × 400 m relay
Silver medal – second place	2023 Astana	4 × 400 m relay
Asian U20 Championships
Gold medal – first place	2023 Yecheon	400 m
Gold medal – first place	2023 Yecheon	400 m hurdles
Arab U20 Championships
Gold medal – first place	2023 Radès	400 m hurdles
Silver medal – second place	2023 Radès	400 m

Ismail Doudai Abakar (born 1 January 2004) is a Qatari hurdler.

== Career ==
He won gold in the 400 m hurdles and silver in the 400 m at the 2022 Arab U20 Athletics Championships in Radès, Tunisia. He competed at the 2022 World Athletics U20 Championships in Cali, Colombia.

In February 2023, he was a silver medalist at the Asian Indoor Championships in the 4 × 400 m relay in Kazakhstan. In May 2023, he lowered his personal best in the 400 m hurdles to 49.18 seconds at the 2023 Doha Diamond League.

In June 2023, he was Asian U20 champion over both 400 m and 400 m hurdles in Yecheon, South Korea. In Bangkok in July 2023, he was a bronze medalist as part of the Qatari 4 × 400 m team at the Asian Championships. In October 2023 in Hangzhou he reached the final of the 400 metres at the delayed 2022 Asian Games, and was a silver medalist in the 4 × 400 m relay.

In Potchefstroom, South Africa in March 2024, he ran a personal best time of 48.68 in the 400 m hurdles that also met the qualifying standard for the 2024 Paris Olympics Games. In May 2024, he ran as part of the Qatari team at the World Athletics Relay in Nassau, Bahamas. That month, he competed in the 400 m hurdles at the 2024 Doha Diamond League. He lowered his 400 m hurdles personal best to 47.72 seconds at the London Athletics Meet on 20 July 2024.

He competed at the 2025 World Athletics Championships in the men's 400 metres hurdles in Tokyo, Japan in September 2025, running a personal best in his semi-final, prior to finishing eighth in the final. He also ran in the men's 4 × 400 metres relay as Qatar placed fifth in the final.

In February 2026, he won the gold medal in the men's 4 × 400 metres relay at the 2026 Asian Indoor Athletics Championships in Tianjin, China.

== Personal life ==
His brother Oumar Doudai Abakar is also a hurdler.
