= 2026 World Athletics U20 Championships – Men's 110 metres hurdles =

Men's 110 metres hurdles at the 2026 World Athletics U20 Championships
- Venue: Hayward Field
- Dates: 7 August (Round 1 & Semi-finals); 8 August (Final)
- Competitors: 55
- Winning time: 12.72 =WU20R

Medalists
gold medal	Le'Ezra Brown	United States
silver medal	Jeremy Koga	Japan
bronze medal	Zacchaeus Brocks	United States

The men's 110 metres hurdles at the 2026 World Athletics U20 Championships was held at Hayward Field in Eugene, United States on 7 and 8 August 2026.

== Records ==
U20 standing records prior to the 2026 World Athletics U20 Championships were as follows:

Record	Athlete & Nationality	Mark	Location	Date
World U20 Record	Sasha Zhoya (FRA)	12.72	Nairobi, Kenya	21 August 2021
Championship Record	Sasha Zhoya (FRA)	12.72	Nairobi, Kenya	21 August 2021
World U20 Leading	Le'Ezra Brown (USA)	12.95	Eugene, United States	19 June 2026

== Results ==
=== Round 1 ===
Round 1 took place in the morning session on 7 August 2026. First 3 of each heat (Q) plus 6 fastest times (q) qualify to the semi-finals.

==== Heat 1 ====
Place	Lane	Athlete	Nation	Time	Notes
1	4	Jahcario Wilson	Bahamas	13.25	Q, PB
2	1	Eljahro Philipsen	Netherlands	13.47	Q
3	8	Marc Leonard Hildebrand	Germany	13.48	Q
4	2	Xie Jianhui	China	13.69	
5	3	Patrick Buscu	Canada	13.82	
6	5	Mohamed Benygzer	Algeria	13.99	
7	6	Mohamed Ismail	Egypt	14.03	
8	7	Ignacio Francisco Lozada	Peru	14.07	
				Wind: (±0.0 m/s)	

==== Heat 2 ====
Place	Lane	Athlete	Nation	Time	Notes
1	6	Phenyo Miyen	South Africa	13.28	Q, PB
2	5	Odair Gonçalves	Brazil	13.39	Q
3	8	Jeremy Koga	Japan	13.54	Q
4	2	Benjamin Salnitro	Malta	13.78	NU20R
5	3	Ioannis Taskoudis	Greece	13.81	
6	1	Wai Kwan Leung	Hong Kong	14.18	
7	4	Gregorio Luis Crespo	Spain	14.19	
8	7	Anugrah Styawan Santoso	Indonesia	18.86	
				Wind: (−1.0 m/s)	

==== Heat 3 ====
Place	Lane	Athlete	Nation	Time	Notes
1	8	Koray Uygun	Turkey	13.38	Q, PB
2	4	Hassan Essa Haqawi	Saudi Arabia	13.43	Q, NU20R
3	1	Zehr Eddine Gasmi	Algeria	13.60	Q
4	3	Alberico Ghedina	Italy	13.61	q, SB
5	6	Oliver Facer	Australia	13.65	q, PB
6	7	Pablo Mackenna	Chile	14.11	
7	2	Martin Tanev	Bulgaria	14.22	
8	5	Jayden Parkin	South Africa	20.31	
				Wind: (+0.5 m/s)	

==== Heat 4 ====
Place	Lane	Athlete	Nation	Time	Notes
1	3	Ewenn Vernack	France	13.22	Q, PB
2	8	Marquies Page	Jamaica	13.34	Q
3	7	Jim Putter	Netherlands	13.35	Q, PB
4	4	Toby Wright	Great Britain	13.57	q
5	5	Liam Aqwa	Israel	13.79	
6	2	Bogdan Goncharov	Kazakhstan	13.99	
7	6	Roland Kis	Hungary	14.00	
8	1	Nils Breuer	Switzerland	14.64	
				Wind: (+0.6 m/s)	

==== Heat 5 ====
Place	Lane	Athlete	Nation	Time	Notes
1	1	Zacchaeus Brocks	United States	13.11	Q
2	2	Taj-Oneil Gordon	Jamaica	13.49	Q
3	8	Hristiyan Kasabov	Bulgaria	13.56	Q
4	4	Kieran Barnewall	Canada	13.87	
5	3	Tiago Guiotti	Brazil	13.90	
6	5	Martin Ďuriš	Slovakia	14.05	
7	6	Santiago Quintero	Venezuela	14.20	SB
8	7	Levente Takács	Hungary	14.70	
				Wind: (+0.9 m/s)	

==== Heat 6 ====
Place	Lane	Athlete	Nation	Time	Notes
1	5	Le'Ezra Brown	United States	12.89	Q, WU20L
2	2	Filippo Vedana	Italy	13.50	Q, PB
3	3	Harrison Purcell	Australia	13.58	Q, PB
4	6	Maito Kamakura	Japan	13.61	q, PB
5	1	Matjaž Girandon	Slovenia	13.65	q, NU20R
6	7	Chen Yi-Xuan	Chinese Taipei	13.66	q
7	4	Arne Döring	Germany	14.09	
				Wind: (+0.1 m/s)	

==== Heat 7 ====
Place	Lane	Athlete	Nation	Time	Notes
1	2	Anthony Johnsen	Norway	13.25	Q
2	8	Sun Zhihao	China	13.46	Q
3	5	Lucas Domergue	France	13.57	Q
4	6	Charalampos Zinonos	Cyprus	13.70	NU20R
5	1	Sven Rymann	Switzerland	13.80	
6	7	Brahian Andres Fretes	Paraguay	14.13	
7	4	Sebastián Palomeque	Colombia	14.18	
8	2	Ng Yue Kiu	Hong Kong	14.56	
				Wind: (±0.0 m/s)	

=== Semi-finals ===
Semi-finals took place in the afternoon session on 7 August 2026. First 3 of each heat (Q) qualify to the final.

==== Heat 1 ====
Place	Lane	Athlete	Nation	Time	Notes
1	6	Le'Ezra Brown	United States	12.82	Q
2	5	Koray Uygun	Turkey	13.16	Q
3	4	Phenyo Miyen	South Africa	13.18	Q
4	8	Hristiyan Kasabov	Bulgaria	13.23	
5	3	Eljahro Philipsen	Netherlands	13.43	
6	7	Taj-Oneil Gordon	Jamaica	13.46	
7	1	Oliver Facer	Australia	13.50	
8	9	Maito Kamakura	Japan	13.52	
9	2	Lucas Domergue	France	13.53	
				Wind: (+2.7 m/s)	

==== Heat 2 ====
Place	Lane	Athlete	Nation	Time	Notes
1	5	Anthony Johnsen	Norway	13.07	Q, NU20R
2	4	Odair Gonçalves	Brazil	13.19	Q, AU20R
3	3	Jim Putter	Netherlands	13.30	Q, PB
4	6	Ewenn Vernack	France	13.36	
5	9	Toby Wright	Great Britain	13.42	SB
6	2	Zehr Eddine Gasmi	Algeria	13.52	SB
7	7	Hassan Essa Haqawi	Saudi Arabia	13.53	
8	1	Alberico Ghedina	Italy	13.77	
—	8	Marc Leonard Hildebrand	Germany	DNF	
				Wind: (+0.9 m/s)	

==== Heat 3 ====
Place	Lane	Athlete	Nation	Time	Notes
1	2	Jeremy Koga	Japan	12.95	Q, AU20R
2	4	Zacchaeus Brocks	United States	13.00	Q
3	5	Jahcario Wilson	Bahamas	13.17	Q, NU20R
4	6	Marquies Page	Jamaica	13.23	PB
5	7	Sun Zhihao	China	13.26	PB
6	3	Filippo Vedana	Italy	13.28	PB
7	8	Harrison Purcell	Australia	13.61	
8	9	Matjaž Girandon	Slovenia	13.67	
9	1	Chen Yi-Xuan	Chinese Taipei	13.79	
				Wind: (+0.3 m/s)	

=== Final ===
The final took place in the afternoon session on 8 August 2026.

Place	Lane	Athlete	Nation	Time	Notes
1st place, gold medalist(s)	4	Le'Ezra Brown	United States	12.72	=WU20R
2nd place, silver medalist(s)	5	Jeremy Koga	Japan	12.97	
3rd place, bronze medalist(s)	7	Zacchaeus Brocks	United States	12.98	=PB
4	6	Anthony Johnsen	Norway	13.00	NU20R
5	2	Jahcario Wilson	Bahamas	13.08	NU20R
6	8	Odair Gonçalves	Brazil	13.15	AU20R
7	3	Koray Uygun	Turkey	13.20	NU20R
8	1	Phenyo Miyen	South Africa	13.26	PB
9	9	Jim Putter	Netherlands	13.36	
				Wind: (+0.7 m/s)	
