= Muhammad Fayyaz =

Pakistani sprinter (born 1967)

Personal information
- Nationality: Pakistani
- Born: 20 January 1967 (age 59) Sargodha

Sport
- Sport: Sprinting
- Event: 400 metres
Medal record
Men's athletics
Representing Pakistan
South Asian Games
Gold medal – first place	1991 Colombo	4×400m
Gold medal – first place	1989 Islamabad	4×400m
Gold medal – first place	1987 Calcutta	400m
Gold medal – first place	1987 Calcutta	4×400m
Silver medal – second place	1989 Islamabad	400m
Silver medal – second place	1985 Dhaka	4×400m
Bronze medal – third place	1985 Dhaka	4×100m
Asian U20 Championships
Silver medal – second place	1986 Jakarta	400 m
Silver medal – second place	1986 Jakarta	4×400m

Muhammad Fayyaz (born 20 January 1967) is a Pakistani sprinter. He competed in the men's 400 metres and men's 4 × 400 metres at the 1988 Summer Olympics.

== See also ==
- List of Pakistani records in athletics
- Athletics in Pakistan
- Pakistan at the Olympics
