= 2024 World Athletics U20 Championships – Men's long jump =

Men's long jump at the 2024 World Athletics U20 Championships
- Venue: Estadio Atlético de la VIDENA
- Dates: 29 August 2024 (qualification); 30 August 2024 (final)
- Competitors: 29 from 24 nations
- Winning distance: 8.17 m

Medalists
gold medal	Roko Farkaš	Croatia
silver medal	Luka Bošković	Serbia
bronze medal	Mason McGroder	Australia

The men's long jump at the 2024 World Athletics U20 Championships was held at the Estadio Atlético de la VIDENA on 29 and 30 August.

== Records ==
U20 standing records prior to the 2024 World Athletics U20 Championships were as follows:

Record	Athlete & Nationality	Mark	Location	Date
World U20 Record	Mattia Furlani (ITA)	8.38	Rome, Italy	8 June 2024
Championship Record	James Stallworth (USA)	8.20	Plovdiv, Bulgaria	9 August 1990
World U20 Leading	Mattia Furlani (ITA)	8.38	Rome, Italy	8 June 2024

== Results ==
=== Qualification ===
Athletes attaining a mark of at least 7.75 metres (Q) or at least the 12 best performers (q) qualified for the final.

==== Group A ====
Rank	Athlete	Nation	Round			Mark	Notes
Rank	Athlete	Nation	1	2	3	Mark	Notes
1	Roko Farkaš	Croatia	8.15			8.15	Q, NU20R
2	Temoso Masikane	South Africa	x	7.87		7.87	Q
3	Luka Bošković	Serbia	7.35	7.36	7.68	7.68	q
4	Simon Plitzko	Germany	7.59	7.40	7.43	7.59	q
5	Mason McGroder	Australia	7.52	7.52	7.58	7.58	q
6	Takuto Tsuchiya	Japan	7.56	x	7.44	7.56	q
7	Krzysztof Grochowski	Poland	7.31	x	7.52	7.52	q
8	Anton Nahorniak	Ukraine	7.41	5.70	7.16	7.41	
9	Juriad Hughes	United States	6.96	7.30	7.24	7.30	
10	Petr Meindlschmid	Czech Republic	7.24	x	x	7.24	
11	Andrei Sandu	Romania	x	7.22	6.33	7.22	
12	Antreas Machallekides	Cyprus	7.10	x	6.98	7.10	
13	Daniele Inzoli	Italy	x	x	6.87	6.87	
14	Andrew Stone	Cayman Islands	6.04	r		6.04	
–	Klemen Modrijančič	Slovenia	x	x	x	NM	

==== Group B ====
Rank	Athlete	Nation	Round			Mark	Notes
Rank	Athlete	Nation	1	2	3	Mark	Notes
1	Julian Holuschek	Germany	7.40	7.30	7.58	7.58	q
2	Jesuye Doherty	Australia	x	x	7.57 w	7.57	q
3	Sebastian Berntsen	Norway	7.50	x	x	7.50	q
4	Zhang Shengming	China	x	7.35	7.49	7.49	q
5	Eito Omori	Japan	x	6.98	7.43	7.43	q
6	Jakub Ptasiewicz	Poland	7.23	7.23	7.40	7.40	
7	Louai Lamraoui	Algeria	7.38	7.16	7.39	7.39	
8	Mohd. Sazid	India	7.39	7.27	7.20	7.39	
9	Lance Aabo	Denmark	7.03	7.25	7.28	7.28	
10	Áron Hajdu	Hungary	7.27	6.85	x	7.27	
11	Josh Parrish	United States	7.21	7.12	6.85	7.21	
12	Aleksis Gailītis	Latvia	x	7.10	7.08	7.10	
13	Frank Nazareno	Ecuador	6.92	x	r	6.92	
14	Nicolas Rivera	Peru	x	x	6.49	6.49	

=== Final ===
Rank	Athlete	Nation	Round						Mark	Notes
Rank	Athlete	Nation	1	2	3	4	5	6	Mark	Notes
1st place, gold medalist(s)	Roko Farkaš	Croatia	7.77	7.81	x	8.17	x	–	8.17 w	
2nd place, silver medalist(s)	Luka Bošković	Serbia	7.31	7.93	7.82	7.62	7.56	x	7.93	
3rd place, bronze medalist(s)	Mason McGroder	Australia	x	7.68	7.62	x	7.80	7.68	7.80	PB
4	Temoso Masikane	South Africa	7.48	7.45	7.64	7.65	x	7.74	7.74	
5	Simon Plitzko	Germany	7.46	7.19	7.67	7.59	7.29	x	7.67	
6	Sebastian Berntsen	Norway	7.59	7.22	–	7.09	7.19	7.54	7.59	
7	Krzysztof Grochowski	Poland	7.53	x	7.57	x	6.66	x	7.57	
8	Takuto Tsuchiya	Japan	x	7.43	7.56	7.45	x	7.19	7.56	
9	Julian Holuschek	Germany	7.17	7.06	7.36				7.36	
10	Eito Omori	Japan	7.13	7.32	5.84				7.32	
11	Jesuye Doherty	Australia	x	x	7.17				7.17	
12	Zhang Shengming	China	6.77	6.68	x				6.77	
