= Claire Stegall =

American middle-distance runner (born 2007)

Personal information
- Born: 5 June 2007 (age 19)

Sport
- Sport: Athletics
- Event: Middle-distance running

Achievements and titles
- Personal bests: 800m: 2:01.07 (2026); 1500m: 4:04.59 (2026); Mile: 4:25.91 (2026)
Medal record
Women's athletics
Representing United States
World U20 Championships
Silver medal – second place	2026 Eugene	1500m

Claire Stegall (born 5 June 2007) is an American middle-distance runner from Tennessee who competes for the University of Florida. She was a silver medalist in the 1500 metres at the 2026 World Athletics U20 Championships.

== Biography ==
From Nolensville, Tennessee, she attended Nolensville High School. At state high school level she won four consecutive 1,600-metres state championships and two consecutive 800 metres titles. She set state record times at both distances and her accolades included being named the Tennessee Gatorade Track and Field Runner of the Year. She was also named the Tennessean Sports Awards Girls Athlete of the Year and the Girls Track and Field Athlete of the Year, prior to competing for the University of Florida.

Competing indoors in March 2026, she was a finalist in the mile run at the 2026 NCAA Division I Indoor Track and Field Championships in Fayetteville, Arkansas. She was also part of the Florida Games team alongside Malia Campbell, Bethan Morley and Layla Haynes that had a fourth place finish in the medley relay at the championships.

In June 2026, she was a semi-finalist in the 1500 metres at the 2026 NCAA Outdoor Championships in Eugene, Oregon. Later that month, Stegall won the 1500 metres at the 2026 USA U20 Championships on 19 June, running a personal best time of 4:04.59 in the final to finish ahead of Ellery Lincoln. Competing at the 2026 USA Championships in New York in July, she reached the final of the 1500 metres, placing fifth overall. She was selected to represent her country at the 2026 World Athletics U20 Championships in Eugene, where she was a silver medalist in the 1500 metres final, closing with a diving finish across the line but missing gold by 0.04 seconds.
