= 2026 World Athletics U20 Championships – Men's shot put =

Men's shot put at the 2026 World Athletics U20 Championships
- Venue: Hayward Field
- Dates: 5 August (Qualification & Final)
- Competitors: 25 from 18 nations
- Winning distance: 20.35 m

Medalists
gold medal	Alessandro Borges	Brazil
silver medal	Park Si-hoon	South Korea
bronze medal	Jaco van Dyk	South Africa

The men's shot put at the 2026 World Athletics U20 Championships was held at Hayward Field in Eugene, United States on 5 August 2026.

== Records ==
U20 standing records prior to the 2026 World Athletics U20 Championships were as follows:

Record	Athlete & Nationality	Mark	Location	Date
World U20 Record	Jacko Gill (NZL)	23.00	Auckland, New Zealand	18 August 2013
Championship Record	Jacko Gill (NZL)	22.20	Barcelona, Spain	11 July 2012
World U20 Leading	Omar Hussein (USA)	21.81	Eugene, United States	19 June 2026

== Results ==
=== Qualification ===
Qualification took place in the morning session on 5 August 2026. Athletes attaining a mark of at least 19.50 metres (Q) or at least the 12 best performers (q) qualified for the final.

==== Group A ====
Place	Athlete	Nation	Round			Mark	Notes
Place	Athlete	Nation	#1	#2	#3	Mark	Notes
1	Alessandro Borges	Brazil	19.63			19.63 m	Q
2	Simon Kunkel	Germany	18.06	19.45	19.00	19.45 m	q
3	Jayden Walcott	Barbados	x	x	18.86	18.86 m	q
4	Chrysovalantis Kanotzian	Greece	18.61	x	18.29	18.61 m	q
5	Maksym Lavryk	Ukraine	18.56	x	x	18.56 m	
6	Omar Hussein	United States	x	18.54	17.95	18.54 m	
7	Raul Andrei Filimon	Romania	16.93	18.46	18.45	18.46 m	
8	Denis Cutcoveţchi	Moldova	17.76	18.17	18.39	18.39 m	
9	Dewald Benjamin Bezuidenhout	South Africa	18.38	x	17.59	18.38 m	
10	Ermin Sinančević	Serbia	x	17.53	18.26	18.26 m	
11	Enhar Mahmić	Bosnia and Herzegovina	x	18.12	x	18.12 m	
12	Kamari Kennedy	Jamaica	16.81	17.15	x	17.15 m	

==== Group B ====
Place	Athlete	Nation	Round			Mark	Notes
Place	Athlete	Nation	#1	#2	#3	Mark	Notes
1	Aristion Anastasios Papadopoulos	Greece	18.20	19.82		19.82 m	Q
2	Park Si-hoon	South Korea	19.69			19.69 m	Q
3	Wu Chenqi	China	19.14	19.43	19.11	19.43 m	q, PB
4	Ingmar Bratteby-Belem	France	x	19.24	x	19.24 m	q
5	Jaco van Dyk	South Africa	18.93	19.09	x	19.09 m	q
6	Yehia Khalid Helmy Mohamed Sawaby	Egypt	x	18.94	18.33	18.94 m	q, PB
7	Ștefan Alexandru Ciobanu	Romania	x	17.75	18.94	18.94 m	q
8	Michael Kpomassy	United States	18.59	18.60	x	18.60 m	q
9	Belmin Sinančević	Serbia	x	18.47	x	18.47 m	
10	Manaia Christiansen	New Zealand	x	18.36	17.53	18.36 m	
11	Antony del Pioluogo	Italy	18.15	x	18.03	18.15 m	
12	Nkosana Obafemi Johnson	Jamaica	16.19	17.25	17.63	17.63 m	

=== Final ===
The final took place in the afternoon session on 5 August 2026.

Place	Athlete	Nation	Round						Mark	Notes
Place	Athlete	Nation	#1	#2	#3	#4	#5	#6	Mark	Notes
1st place, gold medalist(s)	Alessandro Borges	Brazil	18.85	20.04	19.81	19.90	20.35	20.09	20.35 m	PB
2nd place, silver medalist(s)	Park Si-hoon	South Korea	19.87	19.45	20.31	19.38	18.91	x	20.31 m	
3rd place, bronze medalist(s)	Jaco van Dyk	South Africa	x	17.86	18.90	19.36	19.80	18.98	19.80 m	PB
4	Yehia Khalid Helmy Mohamed Sawaby	Egypt	18.53	x	19.73	x	x	x	19.73 m	PB
5	Ingmar Bratteby-Belem	France	19.14	x	18.32	19.50	19.16	x	19.50 m	
6	Jayden Walcott	Barbados	18.97	17.99	18.61	19.27	19.21	x	19.27 m	
7	Wu Chenqi	China	19.04	18.96	19.16	19.26	19.01		19.26 m	
8	Ștefan Alexandru Ciobanu	Romania	19.05	x	x	19.20	x		19.20 m	
9	Simon Kunkel	Germany	17.56	18.85	18.63	19.06			19.06 m	
10	Chrysovalantis Kanotzian	Greece	18.30	18.99	18.56	18.36			18.99 m	
11	Michael Kpomassy	United States	x	x	18.85				18.85 m	
—	Aristion Anastasios Papadopoulos	Greece	x	x	x				NM	
