= 2004 Asian Junior Athletics Championships =

11th Asian Junior Championships
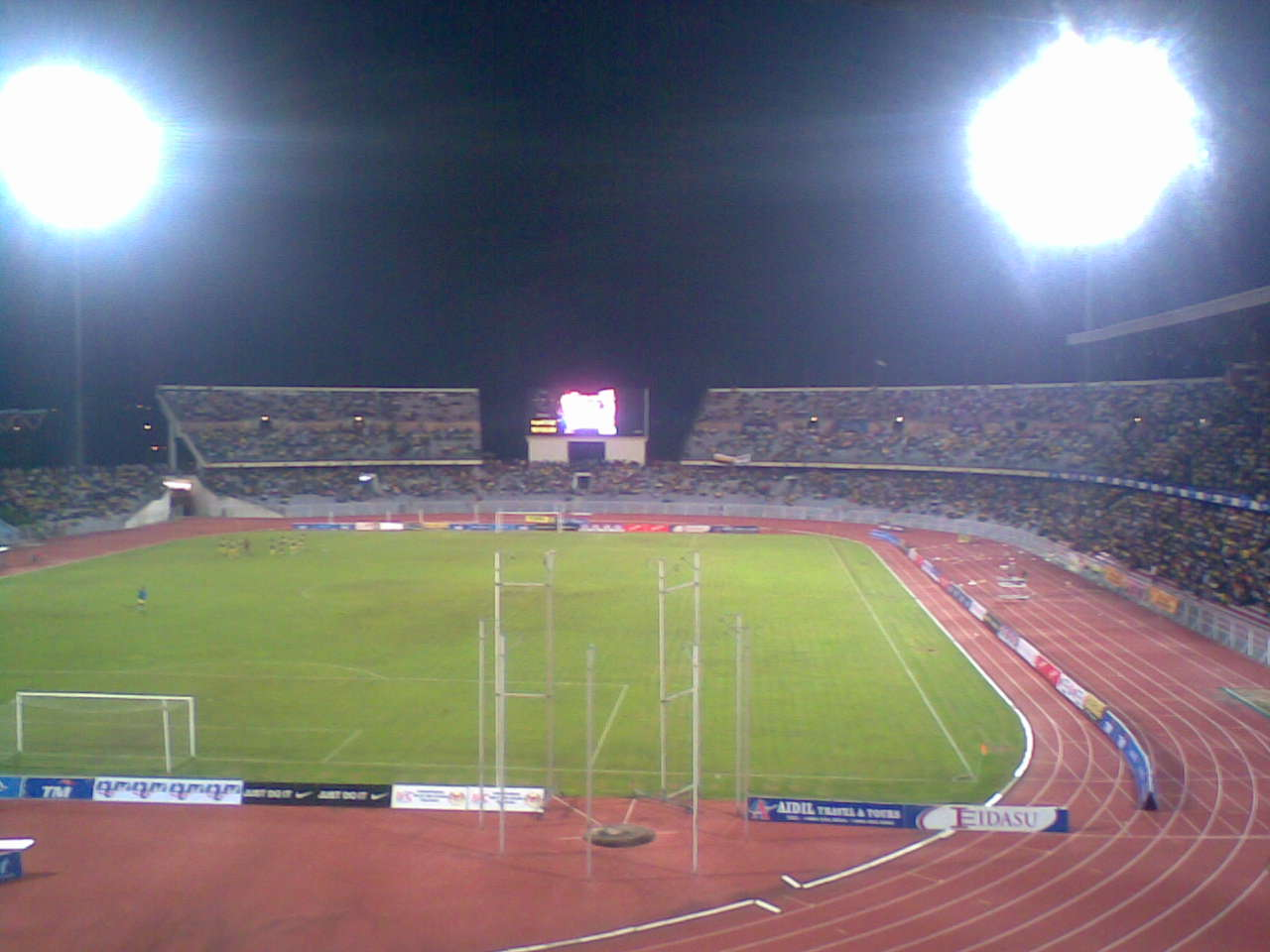
- The host stadium
- Dates: 12–15 June
- Host city: Ipoh, Malaysia
- Venue: Perak Stadium
- Level: Junior (under-20)
- Events: 43

The 2004 Asian Junior Athletics Championships was the eleventh edition of the international athletics competition for Asian under-20 athletes, organised by the Asian Athletics Association. It took place from 12–15 June at the Perak Stadium in Ipoh, Malaysia. A total of 43 events were contested, which were divided equally between male and female athletes aside from the men's 3000 metres steeplechase.

== Medal summary ==
=== Men ===
Event	Gold		Silver		Bronze	
100 metres	Yahya Al-Ghahes (KSA)	10.40	Yahya Ibrahim (KSA)	10.53	Guo Fan (CHN)	10.66
200 metres	Mohamed Al-Rasheedi (BHR)	21.16	Surinder Singh (IND)	21.27	Musa Al-Housaoui (KSA)	21.36
400 metres	Mohamed Al-Salhi (KSA)	46.35	Manoi Pushpa Kumara (SRI)	46.56	Mohamed Moussa (QAT)	47.72
800 metres	Salem Amer Al-Badri (QAT)	1:50.52	Majed Saeed Sultan (QAT)	1:51.34	Musa Nasser Al-Asiri (KSA)	1:52.02
1500 metres	Sultan Khamis Zaman (QAT)	3:50.99	Majed Saeed Sultan (QAT)	3:52.44	Pritam Bind (IND)	3:53.62
5000 metres	Moustafa Ahmed Shebto (QAT)	14:14.65 CR	Naser Jamal Naser (QAT)	14:39.26	Chen Mingfu (CHN)	14:43.52
10,000 metres	Musa Amer Obaid (QAT)	30:31.22	Naser Jamal Naser (QAT)	31:16.25	Chen Mingfu (CHN)	31:30.93
110 metres hurdles	Mubarak Al-Mabadi (KSA)	14.21	Kuo Hung-yi (TPE)	14.45	Tomoki Nakamura (JPN)	14.54
400 metres hurdles	Ibrahim Al-Hamaidi (KSA)	50.43 CR	Mohamed Daak (KSA)	52.69	Wanchai Glinkajorn (THA)	53.04
3000 metres steeplechase	Musa Amer Obaid (QAT)	8:33.39 CR	Moustafa Ahmed Shebto (QAT)	8:39.66	Ali Al-Amri (KSA)	9:04.39
4 × 100 m relay	Thailand (THA)	40.30	Saudi Arabia (KSA)	40.54	China (CHN)	40.64
4 × 400 m relay	Saudi Arabia (KSA)	3:09.02	India (IND)	3:13.99	Thailand (THA)	3:14.52
10,000 metres walk	Li Jianbo (CHN)	42:43.08	Kim Hyun-sub (KOR)	42:49.80	Gong Jiancheng (CHN)	43:06.13
High jump	Liu Yang (CHN)	2.23 m CR	Hu Tong (CHN)	2.19 m	Wu Cheng-Hung (TPE)	2.08 m
Pole vault	Masato Hodotsuka (JPN)	5.05 m	Zhao Yu (CHN)	4.90 m	Shungo Shimizu (JPN)	4.75 m
Long jump	Koilparambil Clinton (IND)	7.57 m	Wang Minsheng (CHN)	7.50 m	Ko Dae-Young (KOR)	7.36 m
Triple jump	Mohamed Al-Majrashi (KSA)	16.25 m	Artyom Lobachev (UZB)	15.86 m	Azmy Suleiman (QAT)	15.70 m
Shot put	Seyed Mehdi Shahrokhi (IRI)	19.99 m	Sun Ke (CHN)	19.58 m	Said Al-Yami (KSA)	18.47 m
Discus throw	Ehsan Haddadi (IRI)	62.24 m	Sultan Al-Dawoodi (KSA)	59.33 m	Liu Jian (CHN)	57.64 m
Hammer throw	Zhao Yihai (CHN)	72.81 m	Lin Ming-Chien (TPE)	70.22 m	Madhu Kumar (IND)	65.25 m
Javelin throw	Lin Heng-Chi (TPE)	67.73 m	Tsubasa Imamiya (JPN)	67.62 m	Gurkirat Singh (IND)	67.22 m
Decathlon	Yu Bin (CHN)	7713 pts CR	Mashari Al-Mubarak (KUW)	6671 pts	Sahar Sazari (MAS)	6584 pts

=== Women ===
Event	Gold		Silver		Bronze	
100 metres	Wang Wenshan (CHN)	11.61	Zou Yiting (CHN)	11.72	Sidi Fatima Mohamad (MAS)	12.12
200 metres	Fauziah Abdul Razak (MAS)	24.49	Gretta Taslakian (LIB)	24.65	Tao Yujia (CHN)	24.75
400 metres	Tang Xiaoyin (CHN)	52.66 CR	Asami Tanno (JPN)	52.88	Olga Tsurikova (KAZ)	53.87
800 metres	Anna Klyushkina (KGZ)	2:05.76	Irina Zudikhina (UZB)	2:07.45	Zhong Jieli (CHN)	2:07.63
1500 metres	Wang Shijuan (CHN)	4:22.54	Tomomi Yuda (JPN)	4:24.71	Misaki Kaku (JPN)	4:26.76
3000 metres	Tomomi Yuda (JPN)	9:30.66	Wang Shijuan (CHN)	9:32.61	Yuki Kazama (JPN)	9:35.11
5000 metres	Yuki Kazama (JPN)	16:41.36	Misaki Katsumata (JPN)	16:48.71	Triyaningsih (INA)	17:26.28
100 metres hurdles	Natalya Ivoninskaya (KAZ)	13.92	Wang Jindan (CHN)	14.05	Kim Soo-Bin (KOR)	14.07
400 metres hurdles	Wang Xing (CHN)	56.60 CR	Nguyen Thi Nu (VIE)	58.44	Tatyana Azarova (KAZ)	58.59
4 × 100 m relay	Japan (JPN)	46.01	Thailand (THA)	46.36	China (CHN)	46.55
4 × 400 m relay	China (CHN)	3:40.56	Kazakhstan (KAZ)	3:43.65	Vietnam (VIE)	3:46.10
10,000 metres walk	Fumi Mitsumura (JPN)	46:58.96 CR	Jiang Kun (CHN)	47:57.30	Sumiko Suzuki (JPN)	49:18.10
High jump	Anna Ustinova (KAZ)	1.84 m	Svetlana Radzivil (UZB)	1.80 m	Sangeetha Mohan (IND)	1.75 m
Pole vault	Zhao Yingying (CHN)	4.20 m CR	Aoki Azusa (JPN)	3.80 m	Choe Yun-Hee (KOR)	3.80 m
Long jump	Zhang Yuan (CHN)	6.33 m	Yukari Nakahara (JPN)	6.14 m	Foujia Huda (BAN)	6.07 m
Triple jump	Li Mingli (CHN)	13.64 m	Sha Li (CHN)	13.21 m	Diana Plumaki (UZB)	13.11 m
Shot put	Li Ling (CHN)	16.08 m	Vasilina Kozyarskaya (UZB)	14.10 m	Lay Chi Wan (SIN)	12.20 m
Discus throw	Ma Xuejun (CHN)	55.78 m	Wang Yu (CHN)	55.05 m	Miki Yamashiro (JPN)	44.98 m
Hammer throw	Yang Qiaoyu (CHN)	61.57 m	Ho Hsing-Mei (TPE)	51.34 m	Miki Yamashiro (JPN)	49.24 m
Javelin throw	Liu Dan (CHN)	52.17 m	Tan Dongyun (CHN)	52.09 m	Yuki Ebihara (JPN)	52.07 m
Heptathlon	Yuliya Tarasova (UZB)	5060 pts	Yuliya Masnik (KAZ)	4943 pts	Xu Lei (CHN)	4928 pts

== 2004 Medal Table ==
Rank	Nation	Gold	Silver	Bronze	Total
1	China (CHN)	16	11	10	37
2	Saudi Arabia (KSA)	6	4	4	14
3	Japan (JPN)	5	6	8	19
4	Qatar (QAT)	5	5	2	12
5	Kazakhstan (KAZ)	2	2	2	6
6	Iran (IRI)	2	0	0	2
7	Uzbekistan (UZB)	1	4	1	6
8	Chinese Taipei (TPE)	1	3	1	5
9	India (IND)	1	2	4	7
10	Thailand (THA)	1	1	2	4
11	Malaysia (MAS)	1	0	2	3
12	Bahrain (BHR)	1	0	0	1
12	Kyrgyzstan (KGZ)	1	0	0	1
14	South Korea (KOR)	0	1	3	4
15	Vietnam (VIE)	0	1	1	2
16	Kuwait (KUW)	0	1	0	1
16	Lebanon (LIB)	0	1	0	1
16	Sri Lanka (SRI)	0	1	0	1
19	Bangladesh (BAN)	0	0	1	1
19	Indonesia (INA)	0	0	1	1
19	Singapore (SIN)	0	0	1	1
Totals (21 entries)		43	43	43	129
