= Alessandro Schenini =

British long jumper (born 2000)

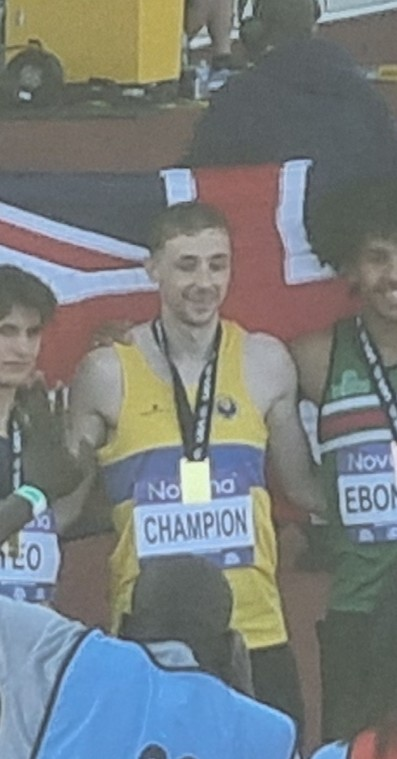
- Alessandro Schenini at the 2025 UK Athletics Championships

Personal information
- Nationality: British (Scottish)
- Born: 28 April 2000 (age 26)

Sport
- Sport: Athletics
- Event: Long jumper

Achievements and titles
- Personal best: Long jump 8.00m (2023)
Medal record
UK Athletics Championships
Gold medal – first place	2025 Birmingham	long jump

Alessandro Schenini (born 28 April 2000) is a Scottish long jumper. In 2025 he became the British champion.

== Biography ==
Schenini set a new personal best and Scottish native record when he jumped 8.00 metres in Grangemouth in August 2023. At the EAP event in Glasgow, Schenini set a new Scottish Indoor Record of 7.86m at the Emirates Arena, Glasgow in February 2025. At the Oban Games, he won both the long jump and triple jump events.

In 2025, Schenini became the British long jump champion after jumping 7.85 metres to win the 2025 UK Athletics Championships in Birmingham, on 2 August 2025.

On 15 February 2026, he won the national indoor title at the 2026 British Indoor Athletics Championships in Birmingham with a jump of 7.53 metres, become the first Scot to win the title since 1968, with only three centimetres separating him from Jack Roach (7.52m) and Daniel Emegbor (7.50m).
