= 2023 Asian U20 Athletics Championships =

20th Asian U20 Athletics Championships
- Dates: 4–7 June
- Host city: Yecheon, South Korea
- Venue: Yecheon Stadium
- Level: Junior (under-20)
- Events: 45

The 2023 Asian U20 Athletics Championships was the 20th edition of the international athletics competition for Asian under-20 athletes, organized by the Asian Athletics Association. Athletes born between 2004 and 2007 competed in 45 events, divided evenly between the sexes, and one mixed event. The competition took place over four days from 4–7 June at the Yecheon Stadium in Yecheon, South Korea.

== Medal table ==
* Host nation (South Korea)

Rank	Nation	Gold	Silver	Bronze	Total
1	Japan	14	4	5	23
2	China	11	5	3	19
3	India	6	7	6	19
4	Uzbekistan	4	4	1	9
5	Chinese Taipei	3	4	6	13
6	Qatar	3	2	0	5
7	Sri Lanka	2	1	2	5
8	Thailand	1	3	1	5
9	Kuwait	1	0	0	1
10	South Korea*	0	5	9	14
11	Kazakhstan	0	5	6	11
12	Iran	0	2	2	4
13	Hong Kong	0	2	1	3
14	Iraq	0	1	1	2
15	Malaysia	0	0	1	1
15	Vietnam	0	0	1	1
Totals (16 entries)		45	45	45	135

== Medal summary ==
=== Men ===
Event	Gold		Silver		Bronze	
100 metres	Kaito Kuroki; Japan	10.37 SB	Lin Po-hsun; Chinese Taipei	10.42 PB	Haruki Narushima; Japan	10.43 SB
200 metres	Chen Jinfeng; China	20.81 PB	Sarawut Nuansri; Thailand	21.18	Pengiran Aidil Auf Bin Hajam; Malaysia	21.37
400 metres	Ismail Doudai Abakar; Qatar	46.18 PB	Bae Geon-yul; South Korea	46.73 PB	Chen Cheng-an; Chinese Taipei	47.32 PB
800 metres	Hironori Tachizako; Japan	1:49.22 PB	Li An-yi; Chinese Taipei	1:49.44 PB	Shakeel; India	1:49.80
1500 metres	Jumpei Maseda; Japan	3.50.15	Mustafa Mohsin Hezam Al-Khazaali; Iraq	3.52.19	Hasan Mehdi; India	3.56.02
3000 metres	Sonata Nagashima; Japan	8:19.49 SB	Kim Tae-hun; South Korea	8:41.14 PB	Mokhles Tuama Alshamkhee; Iraq	8:42.26
5000 metres	Sonata Nagashima; Japan	14:23.91	Shivaji Paradhu Madappagoudra; India	14:49.06	Kim Tae-hun; South Korea	14:49.56
110 m hurdles (99 cm)	Hsieh Yuan-kai; Chinese Taipei	13.44 PB	Oumar Doudai Abakar; Qatar	13.68	Liu Hiu Long; Hong Kong	13.73 PB
400 m hurdles	Ismail Doudai Abakar; Qatar	49.30	Ryoma Konno; Japan	49.91 PB	Lin Chung-wei; Chinese Taipei	50.16 PB
3000 m steeplechase	Asahi Kuroda; Japan	8:39.83	Sharuk Khan; India	8:51.75 SB	Samir Eghbalighahyazi; Iran	9:07.62
10,000 m walk	Bao Xingzu; China	42:07.53	Zhang Zhiwei; China	42:50.71	Shotaro Shimoike; Japan	44:05.50
4 × 100 m relay	Haruki Narushima; Kaito Kuroki; Yuta Sekiguchi; Eito Watanabe; Japan	39.76 SB	Kim Jeong-yoon; Kim Dong-jin; Bae Geon-yul; Nwamadi Joel-jin; South Korea	40.32 SB	Vallipi Hima Teja; Arijit Rana; Mohammad Reyan Basha; Dondapati Mrutyam Jayaram; India	40.56
4 × 400 m relay	Methawi Kanhaaudom; Lakki Yuyamadu; Thawatchai Himaiad; Sarawut Nuansri; Thailand	3:08.34 SB	Deepak Singh; Sharan Megavarnam; Rihan Choudhary; Navpreet Singh; India	3:08.79	Kim Jeong-hyun; Bae Geon-yul; Na Hyun-joo; Kim Jun-sung; South Korea	3:12.08
High jump	Lo Tzu-chieh; Chinese Taipei	2.20 m PB	Choi Jin-woo; South Korea	2.20 m SB	Souta Haraguchi; Japan	2.18 m
Pole vault	Seif Heneida; Qatar	5.50 m CR, NR	Liu Rui; China	5.15 m	Rui Kitada; Japan	5.10 m SB
Long jump	Shu Heng; China	8.03 m PB	Lin Ming Fu; Hong Kong	7.49 m	Zhang Hongming; China	7.34 m
Triple jump	Miyao Manato; Japan	16.38 m PB	Ma Yinglong; China	16.22 m	Malith Yasiru; Sri Lanka	15.82 m
Shot put	Siddharth Choudhry; India	19.52 m PB	Djibrine Adoum Ahmat; Qatar	18.85 m	Park Si-hoon; South Korea	18.70 m
Discus throw	Bhartpreet Singh; India	55.66 m	Sayfullaev Dunyozod; Uzbekistan	55.58 m	Mohammadreza Ziyaii; Iran	55.44 m
Hammer throw	Mohamed Adel Khan; Kuwait	64.78 m PB	Mahdi Haft Cheshmeh; Iran	63.96 m	Jang Young-min; South Korea	59.22 m
Javelin throw	Huang Chao-hung; Chinese Taipei	72.85 m	Shivam Lohakare; India	72.34 m	Choi Woo-jin; South Korea	70.41 m
Decathlon	Sunil Kumar; India	7003 pts PB	Nodir Norbaev; Uzbekistan	6956 pts PB	Samandar Makhmudov; Uzbekistan	6840 pts

=== Women ===
Event	Gold		Silver		Bronze	
100 metres	Xiong Shiqi; China	11.62	Liu Xiajun; China	11.85	Athicha Phetkun; Thailand	11.86
200 metres	Jennifer Saita; Japan	23.99	Athicha Phetkun; Thailand	24.31	Yang Mei-mei; Chinese Taipei	24.33
400 metres	Rezoana Mallick Heena; India	53.32	Tharushi Karunarathna; Sri Lanka	53.71	Jayeshi Uththara; Sri Lanka	55.52
800 metres	Tharushi Karunarathna; Sri Lanka	2:05.64	Akbayan Nurmamet; Kazakhstan	2:10.22 PB	Qin Yingying; China	2:11.14
1500 metres	Laxita Sandilea; India	4:24.23	Akbayan Nurmamet; Kazakhstan	4:24.92	Nanaka Yonezawa; Japan	4:25.75
3000 metres	Kana Mizumoto; Japan	9:16.93	Bushra Khan; India	9:41.45	Ayana Bolatbekkyzy; Kazakhstan	10:30.70
5000 metres	Nanaka Yonezawa; Japan	16:37.37	Akari Masumoto; Japan	16:42.22	Antima Pal; India	17:17.12
100 m hurdles	Miki Hayashi; Japan	13.64	Chloe Pak Hoi Man; Hong Kong	13.91	Kristina Ermola; Kazakhstan	14.57
400 m hurdles	Miku Takino; Japan	58.92	Nazanin Fatemeh Eidian; Iran	1:00.01	Anastassiya Koloda; Kazakhstan	1:00.40
3000 m steeplechase	Dilshoda Usmanova; Uzbekistan	10:22.41 NR	Akbilek Kuralbai; Kazakhstan	10:35.44	Lê Thị Thanh Nga; Vietnam	11:09.05
10,000 m walk	Chen Meiling; China	46:11.08	Ai Oyama; Japan	46:56.24	Yasmina Toxanbaeva; Kazakhstan	47:01.55
4 × 100 m relay	China; Liu Xiajun; Zhao Junyan; Na Huang; Xiong Shiqi	45.05	Thailand; Jirapat Khanonta; Manatsada Sanmano; Suwimol Srathienthong; Atchiha Phetkun	45.34	India; Tamanna; S. Akshaya; Nayana Kokare; Abinaya Rajarajan	45.36
4 × 400 m relay	India; Anushka Dattatray; Riya Nitin Patil; Kanista Teena Shekhar; Rezoana Mallick Heena	3:40.50	Kazakhstan; Mariya Shuvalova; Sofya Kidenko; Anastasiya Koloda; Anna Shumilo	3:46.19	South Korea; Sin Hyun-jin; Lee Min-kyung; Jo Yoon-seo; Choi Ji-Seon	3:47.46
High jump	Barnokhon Saifullaeva; Uzbekistan	1.84 m	Pooja Singh; India	1.82 m	Lin Pei-hsuan; Chinese Taipei	1.82 m
Pole vault	Wei Lingxia; China	3.95 m	Chen Tzu-tsen; Chinese Taipei	3.85 m	Yen Tzu-hsin; Chinese Taipei	3.75 m
Long jump	Huang Yingying; China	6.24 m	Susmita; India	5.96 m	Anastassiya Rypakova; Kazakhstan	5.90 m
Triple jump	Khushnoza Shavkatova; Uzbekistan	13.07 m	Valeriya Safonova; Kazakhstan	12.78 m	Viktoriya Popravkina; Kazakhstan	12.65 m
Shot put	Lin Jiaxin; China	15.91 m	Malika Nasriddinova; Uzbekistan	15.76 m	Gao Yirui; China	15.30 m
Discus throw	Huang Jingru; China	56.75 m	Jiang Zhichao; China	55.23 m	Yee Hye-min; South Korea	48.60 m
Hammer throw	Gao Jinyao; China	64.92 m	Elina Silyamiyeva; Uzbekistan	60.53 m	Kim Tae-hee; South Korea	59.97 m
Javelin throw	Nozomi Sakurai; Japan	50.02 m	Chu Pin-hsun; Chinese Taipei	49.38 m	Yang Seok-ju; South Korea	47.88 m
Heptathlon	Ugiloy Norboyeva; Uzbekistan	5130 pts	Miki Hayashi; Japan	5095 pts	Lin Pei-hsuan; Chinese Taipei	5070 pts

=== Mixed ===
Event	Gold		Silver		Bronze	
4 × 400 m relay	Vinod Ariyawansha; Jayeshi Uththara; Shehan Dilranga; Tharushi Karunarathna; Sri Lanka	3:25.41 NR	Kim Jeong-hyun; Lee Min-kyung; Bae Geon-yul; Sin Hyun-jin; South Korea	3:28.30	Deepak Singh; Anushka Kumbhar; Navpreet Singh; Heena Mallick; India	3:30.13

== See also ==
- 2023 Asian U18 Athletics Championships
