= Jeremy Koga =

Japanese athlete (born 2007)

Personal information
- Born: 21 May 2007 (age 19)

Sport
- Sport: Athletics
- Event: Hurdles
Medal record
Men's athletics
Representing Japan
World U20 Championships
Silver medal – second place	2026 Eugene	110m hurdles
Asian U20 Championships
Gold medal – first place	2026 Hong Kong	110m hurdles

Jeremy Koga (born 21 May 2007) is a Japanese high hurdler. He was Asian under-20 champion in the 110 metres hurdles in 2026.

== Biography ==
Koga won the 110 metres hurdles title at the 2026 Asian U20 Athletics Championships in Hong Kong. His winning time of 13.05 seconds broke the meet record and set a new Japanese U20 national record. He represented Japan at the 2026 World Athletics U20 Championships in Eugene, USA, winning his semi-final in 12.95 seconds, before winning the silver medal in the final with a time of 12.97 seconds behind a U20 world-record equalling run by Le'Ezra Brown of the United States.

== Personal life ==
Koga graduated from Tokyo High School in March 2026 and enrolled at Juntendo University in April.
