= Sherry Drury =

Japanese track and field athlete (born 2007)

Personal information
- Nationality: Japanese
- Born: 16 November 2007 (age 18) Tsuyama, Okayama Prefecture, Japan

Sport
- Sport: Track and field
- Event: Middle-distance running
Medal record
Athletics
Asian U20 Athletics Championships
Gold medal – first place	2024 Dubai	1500 metres

Sherry Drury (Japanese: ドルーリー朱瑛里, romanized: Doruri Shieri; born 16 November 2007) is a Japanese track and field athlete who specializes in middle-distance running. Representing Japan at the 2024 Asian U20 Athletics Championships, she won a gold medal at the women's 1500 metres.

== International competitions ==
Year	Competition	Venue	Position	Event	Notes
Representing Japan
2024	Asian U20 Athletics Championships	Dubai, UAE	1st	1500 m	4:21.41
2024	World Athletics U20 Championships	Lima, Peru	11th (h)	1500 m	4:27.08
