= Mason McGroder =

Australian long jumper

Personal information
- Nationality: Australian
- Born: 18 September 2008 (age 18)

Sport
- Sport: Athletics
- Event: Long jump

Achievements and titles
- Personal bests: Long jump: 7.83m (Eugene, 2026)
Medal record
Men's athletics
Representing Australia
World U20 Championships
Silver medal – second place	2026 Eugene	Long jump
Bronze medal – third place	2024 Lima	Long jump
Australian rules football career
Personal information
- Original team: Sydney Swans Academy/Maroubra Saints
- Draft: No. 61 (northern academy selection), 2026 national draft
- Position: Key defender
Club information
- Current club: Sydney
Playing career
Years	Club	Games (Goals)
2027–	Sydney	0 (0)

Mason McGroder (born 18 September 2008) is an Australian long jumper and Australian rules footballer.

== Biography ==
=== Athletics ===
McGroder won the Australian U17 long jump, U17 400m and U20 long jump titles in Adelaide in 2024, as a 15 year-old. He won a bronze medal at the 2024 World Athletics U20 Championships in Lima, Peru with a personal best long jump of 7.80 metres, despite still being aged 15, and the youngest member of Australia's team at the Games. His bronze medal winning personal best was the third longest in history by a 15-year-old, and made him the youngest ever Australian medallist at the World U20 Championships.

McGroder was awarded a Sport Australia Hall of Fame awards scholarship in September 2024. Competing at the Australia All Schools Athletics Championships in Brisbane, he set a new Under 17 Boys meet record in the long jump of 7.86m (+2.4) in December 2024. The jump bettered the 7.50m mark set by Lynten Johnson in 1986, and equalled by Chris Noffke in 2004.

McGroder was runner-up to Liam Adcock at the Australian short track national championships in Sydney on 1 February 2025. Competing at the 2026 World Athletics U20 Championships in Eugene, USA, he qualified for the final with a personal best of 7.83 metres in the preliminary round. He won the silver medal in the final with a new personal best of 7.96 metres, 1cm behind the gold medal winner Daniele Inzoli of Italy.

=== Australian rules football ===
Alongside his athletics, McGroder also played Australian rules football and was a member of the Sydney Swans Academy. In 2026, he declared for the Australian Football League draft. A halfback, in the draft combine he finished first in the 20m sprint with a time of 2.827 seconds and finished second in the vertical jump (85cm) and running vertical jump (107cm). He was drafted by Sydney Swans with the 61st selection in the 2026 national draft, after they matched a bid for him by Collingwood.

== Personal life ==
He is from Caringbah in Sydney, He attends Trinity Grammar School in Sydney. Australian Olympian long jumper Liam Adcock has been described as a mentor.
