= Anthony Johnsen =

Norwegian athlete (born 2007)

Anthony Ommundsen Johnsen
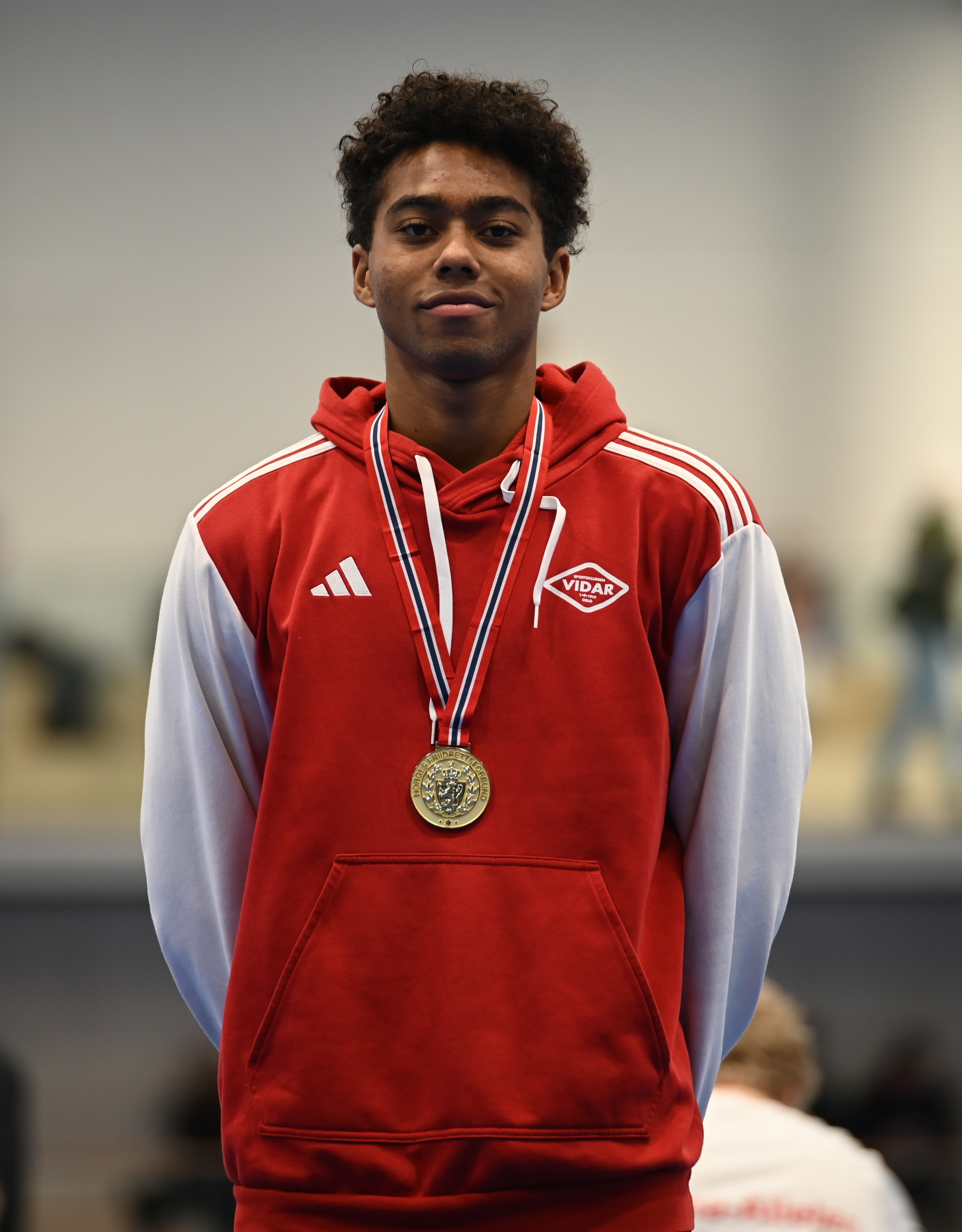

Personal information
- Born: 4 February 2007 (age 19)

Sport
- Sport: Athletics

Achievements and titles
- Personal bests: 60mH: 7.64 (2026) NR; 110mH: 13.35 (2026) NR

Anthony Ommundsen Johnsen (born 4 February 2007) is a Norwegian multi-event athlete. He set a new Norwegian national record in the 60 metres hurdles in 2026 and won the Norwegian Indoor Athletics Championships that year prior to representing the country at the 2026 World Athletics Indoor Championships.

== Biography ==
From Arendal, he trains with his older sister Nathalie. A successful junior athlete, he became a Norwegian age group record in 2022 as a 15 year-old. In 2023, as a 16 year-old, he placed second in the high jump at the Norwegian Athletics Championships, behind Sander Skotheim.

He is a member of Oslo-based club Vidar. In August 2025, he set a new Norwegian U20 record in the 110 metres hurdles, and won the Norwegian U20 Championships in that event. At the 2025 Norwegian U20 Championships, he also placed second overall in the long jump, 1cm behind the winner, Erlend Grytten Sunnarvik.

In February 2026, he set a new Norwegian national record in the 60 metres hurdles, running 7.64 seconds at Bassen Sprint in Bærum. Running 7.78 seconds, he won the 60 metres hurdles at the senior Norwegian Indoor Athletics Championships in Bergen on 1 March 2026. He was selected for the 60 metres hurdles at the 2026 World Athletics Indoor Championships in Toruń, Poland, running 7.71 seconds and narrowly missing out on the semi-finals. He won the 2026 Norwegian Athletics Championships in July with 13.44 seconds to equal the European U20 best time. He represented Norway at the 2026 World Athletics U20 Championships in Eugene, USA, winning his semi-final in 13.07 seconds and setting a new Norwegian under-20 record of 13.00 seconds to place fourth overall in the final. In Gothenburg on 24 August at the Folksam Grand Prix, Johnsen ran the fastest ever 110 m hurdles by a European U20 athlete, moving solo ahead of Colin Jackson, with 13.35 seconds, also breaking the Norwegian senior national record.
