= Alessandro Borges =

Brazilian athlete (born 2007)

Personal information
- Full name: Alessandro Borges Soares
- Born: 2 April 2007 (age 19)

Sport
- Sport: Athletics
- Event: Shot put
Medal record
Men's athletics
Representing Brazil
World U20 Championships
Gold medal – first place	2026 Eugene	Shot put
Pan American U20 Championships
Gold medal – first place	2025 Bogotá	Shot put
Junior Pan American Games
Bronze medal – third place	2025 Asunción	Shot put

Alessandro Borges Soares (born 2 April 2007) is a Brazilian shot putter. He won the gold medal at the 2026 World U20 Championships.

== Biography ==
From Araçatuba in the state of São Paulo, he began in athletics through a grassroots program in his hometown in 2022. He later became coached by Andrea Maria Pereira Britto. A member of Praia Clube Uberlândia, he trains with world indoor champion South American record holder Darlan Romani and also receives guidance from Darlan's coach, Justo Navarro. Borges represented Brazil at the 2024 World Athletics U20 Championships in Lima, Peru.

Borges won the bronze medal at the 2025 Junior Pan American Games in Asunción, Paraguay. Latef that year, he won the gold medal at the 2025 Pan American U20 Athletics Championships with a shot put of 19.74 metres.

Borges set a personal best of 20.29m when winning the Brazilian U20 title shot put title in July 2026. On 5 August 2026, he won the gold medal in the shot put final at the 2026 World Athletics U20 Championships in Eugene, United States with a personal best mark using the 6 kg shot of 20.35 metres.
