= 2024 Asian U20 Athletics Championships =

21st Asian U20 Athletics Championships
- Dates: 24–27 April
- Host city: Dubai, United Arab Emirates
- Venue: Dubai Police Club Stadium
- Level: Junior (under-20)
- Events: 45

The 2024 Asian U20 Athletics Championships is the 21st edition of the international athletics competition for Asian under-20 athletes, organized by the Asian Athletics Association. Athletes born between 2005 and 2008 competed in 45 events, divided evenly between the sexes, and one mixed event. The competition took place over four days from 24 to 27 April at the Dubai Police Club Stadium, United Arab Emirates.

The Asian Championship will serve as a qualifying tournament for 2024 World Athletics U20 Championships to be held in Lima, Peru.

== Medal summary ==
=== Men ===
Event	Gold		Silver		Bronze	
100 metres (wind: +0.4 m/s)	Zeng Keli; China	10.19	Chan Yat Lok; Hong Kong	10.41	Kwok Chun Ting; Hong Kong	10.46
200 metres (wind: +1.2 m/s)	Wirayut Daenkhanob; Thailand	20.84	Magnus Prostur Johannsson; Hong Kong	20.92 NR	Pengiran Aidil Auf Bin Hajam; Malaysia	21.28
400 metres	Ailixier Wumaier; China	45.53 CR	Li Yiqing; China	46.61	Aman Choudhary; India	47.53
800 metres	Ko Ochiai; Japan	1:48.01	Hatim Ait Oulghazi; Qatar	1:48.39	Hironori Tachizako; Japan	1:49.73
1500 metres	Hatim Ait Oulghazi; Qatar	3:50.76	Priyanshu; India	3:50.85	Mustafa Mohsen Al-Khazaali; Iraq	3:51.76
3000 metres	Yota Mashiko; Japan	8:16.06 CR	Gaurav Bhosale; India	8:31.20	Vikas Kumar Bind; India	8:33.00
5000 metres	Sota Orita; Japan	14:08.71 CR	Vinod Singh; India	14:09.44	Kaito Iida; Japan	14:09.63
110 metres hurdles (99 cm) (wind: +1.2 m/s)	Omar Doudai Abakar; Qatar	13.24 CR	Chen Yuanjiang; China	13.26	Yuki Hojo; Japan	13.74
400 metres hurdles	Shota Fuchigami; Japan	49.97	Cai Yuchen; China	51.88	Kim Jeong-hyun; South Korea	52.00
3000 metres steeplechase	Ranvir Kumar; India	9:22.67	Mustafa Mohsen Al-Khazaali; Iraq	9:28.84	Bader Fouad Al-Ghamdi; Saudi Arabia	9:36.78
4 × 100 metres relay	Hong Kong	39.67	Sri Lanka	39.81	India	40.01
4 × 400 metres relay	Thailand; Nonthawat Phatdichit; Khunaphat Kaijan; Chakkaphat Nonthaton; Nuansi Sarawut	3:09.33	India; Pramod Abiram; Navpreet Singh; Nikhil Suhas; Aman Choudhary	3:09.36	Sri Lanka; Pathiranage Rajapaksha; Shashintra Silva; Hasindu Netshara; Jathya Kirulu	3:09.48
10,000 metres walk	Zhi Ni; China	42:47.42	Wang Jiaqi; China	42:49.17	Kazuhiro Umeda; Japan	43:14.85
High jump	Dong Ziang; China	2.21	Kaisei Nakatani; Japan	2.19	Choi Jin-woo; South Korea	2.11
Pole vault	Seifeldin Abdelsalam; Qatar	5.51 CR, =NR	Rikuya Yoshida; Japan	5.25	Dev Meena; India	5.10
Long jump	Wei Junzheng; China	7.76	Zhang Shenming; China	7.58	Mohd Atta Sazid; India	7.52
Triple jump	Xu Hetong; China	15.85	Sami Bakheet; Saudi Arabia	15.71	Ng Tak Sing; Malaysia	15.62
Shot put (6 kg)	Anurag Singh Kaler; India	19.23	Park Si-hoon; South Korea	19.23	Siddharth Choudhary; India	19.02
Discus throw (1.75 kg)	Djibrine Ahmat; Qatar	54.80 m	Ritik; India	53.01 m	Hassan Mubarak; Saudi Arabia	50.41 m
Hammer throw (6 kg)	Harshit Kumar; India	66.70 m	Mehdi Haftcheshmeh; Iran	66.64 m	Prateek; India	65.97 m
Javelin throw	Dipanshu Sharma; India	70.29 m	Rohan Yadav; India	70.03 m	Jung Jun-seok; South Korea	65.32 m
Decathlon U20	Nodir Norbaev; Uzbekistan	7122 pts	Nam Hyun-bin; South Korea	6366 pts	Ivan Sening; Kazakhstan	6274 pts

=== Women ===
Event	Gold		Silver		Bronze	
100 metres (wind: +0.7 m/s)	Chen Yujie; China	11.32 CR, AYR	Trần Thị Nhi Yến; Vietnam	11.40	Misaki Morimoto; Japan	11.79
200 metres (wind: +2.2 m/s)	Liu Yinglan; China	22.94	Trần Thị Nhi Yến; Vietnam	23.48	Jirapat Khanonta; Thailand	24.34
400 metres	Jonbibi Hukmova; Uzbekistan	55.00	Wang Yalun; China	55.45	Mariya Shuvalova; Kazakhstan	55.99
800 metres	Yuri Nishida; Japan	2:06.55	Laxita Sandilea; India	2:07.10	Sari Kamei; Japan	2:07.56
1500 metres	Shieri Doruri; Japan	4:21.41	Laxita Sandilea; India	4:25.63	Liu Yan; China	4:30.58
3000 metres	Li Yaxuan; China	9:12.79	Narumi Okumoto; Japan	9:25.19	Nozomi Kondo; Japan	9:38.91
5000 metres	Li Yaxuan; China	16:34.82	Ekta Pradeep; India	16:49.70	Sunita Devi; India	16:52.54
100 metres hurdles (wind: +1.3 m/s)	Tenka Taninaka; Japan	13.52	Anna Matsuda; Japan	13.59	Unnathi Bolland; India	13.66
400 metres hurdles	Nazanin Fatemeh Eidian; Iran	58.86 NR	Yi Po-an; Chinese Taipei	58.90	Shreeya Rajesh; India	59.20
3000 metres steeplechase	Ekta Pradeep; India	10:31.95	Dilshoda Usmanova; Uzbekistan	10:41.37	Mashkura Soybova; Uzbekistan	11:31.35
4 × 100 metres relay	Hong Kong; Janice Cheung; Yip Man Yan; Serena Cheuk Tang; Chloe Pak Hoi Man	46.68	Thailand; Jirapat Khanonta; Phatthraporn Dechanon; Suwimol Srathienthong; Chantell Mauricette	46.75	Only two teams finished	
4 × 400 metres relay	India; Anushka Dattatray; Kanista Teena Shekhar; D. Sangeetha; Sandra Mol Sabu	3:41.50	Kazakhstan; Milana Zubareva; Sofya Kidenko; Yekaterina Koloda; Mariya Shuvalova	3:45.71	Sri Lanka; Jithma Wijethunga; Mahima Dunusinghe; Charuni Pramudika; Takshima Nuhansa	3:46.20
10,000 metres walk	Pang Liping; China	47:22.63	Baima Zhuoma; China	47:36.47	Aarti; India	47:45.51
High jump	Barnokhon Sayfullaeva; Uzbekistan	1.83 m	Faina Meirmanova; Kazakhstan	1.76 m	Emiliya Rudina; Uzbekistan	1.74 m
Pole vault	Miku Yanagawa; Japan	3.85 m	Anna Cherkashina; Kazakhstan	3.60 m	Maria Andriany; Indonesia	3.60 m
Long jump	Pavana Nagaraj; India	6.32 m	Nono Tsuneishi; Japan	6.21 m	Jia Wai Yin; Hong Kong	6.13 m
Triple jump	Khushnoza Shavkatova; Uzbekistan	13.33 m	M.H.N. Herath; Sri Lanka	13.01 m	Jang Seon-gi; South Korea	12.67 m
Shot put	Ding Zhuhui; China	15.82 m	Lin Jiaxin; China	15.61 m	Park So-jin; South Korea	15.13 m
Discus throw	Han Bingyan; China	56.35 m	Amanat Kamboj; India	50.45 m	Zhang Mengyuan; China	50.13 m
Hammer throw	Zhang Jiale; China	66.79 m	Fang Ling; China	62.35 m	Kim Tae-hui; South Korea	61.19 m
Javelin throw	Chu Pin-hsun; Chinese Taipei	52.21 m	Tai Yu-Chin; Chinese Taipei	52.01 m	Miyabi Sono; Japan	51.02 m
Heptathlon	Alina Chistyakova; Kazakhstan	5481 pts	Irina Konichsheva; Kazakhstan	5438 pts	Chen Yanqi; China	5432 pts

=== Mixed ===
Event	Gold		Silver		Bronze	
4 × 400 metres relay	China; Ailixier Wumaier; Wang Yalun; Li Yiqing; Liu Yinglan	3:22.46 CR	India; Pramod Abiram; Kanista Teena Shekhar; Navpreet Singh; Sandra Mol Sabu	3:24.86	Sri Lanka; Jathya Kirulu; Jithma Wijethunga; Pathiranage Rajapaksha; Takshima Nuhansa	3:28.18

== Medal table ==
* Host nation (United Arab Emirates)

Rank	Nation	Gold	Silver	Bronze	Total
1	China	15	8	4	27
2	Japan	8	6	7	21
3	India	7	11	11	29
4	Uzbekistan	4	1	2	7
5	Qatar	4	1	0	5
6	Hong Kong	2	2	2	6
7	Thailand	2	1	1	4
8	Kazakhstan	1	4	2	7
9	Chinese Taipei	1	2	0	3
10	Iran	1	1	0	2
11	South Korea	0	2	6	8
12	Sri Lanka	0	2	3	5
13	Vietnam	0	2	0	2
14	Saudi Arabia	0	1	2	3
15	Iraq	0	1	1	2
16	Malaysia	0	0	2	2
17	Indonesia	0	0	1	1
Totals (17 entries)		45	45	44	134
