= Neelam Kumari =

Member of the National Assembly of Pakistan (2024–2029)

- نیلم کُماری

Member of the National Assembly of Pakistan
- Constituency: Reserved seat for minorities

Personal details
- Party: Pakistan Muslim League (N)

Neelam Kumari (Urdu: نیلم کُماری), is a Pakistani politician who is member of the National Assembly of Pakistan.

== Political career ==
Kumari was allotted a reserved seat for minorities in National Assembly of Pakistan after 2024 Pakistani general election as part of the reserved quota for Pakistan Muslim League (N).

On 13 May 2024, the Election Commission of Pakistan (ECP) suspended her membership as a member of the National Assembly. This action followed a Supreme Court of Pakistan decision to suspend the verdict of the Peshawar High Court, which had denied the allocation of a reserved seat to the PTI-Sunni Ittehad Council bloc.
