= Daniel Emegbor =

British long jumper (born 2008)

Personal information
- Born: 20 October 2008 (age 18)

Sport
- Sport: Athletics
- Event: Long jump

Achievements and titles
- Personal bests: Long jump: 7.80 m (Birmingham, 2025); 60m:: 6.98 m (London, 2025); 100m: 10.88 m (London, 2025)

Daniel Emegbor (born 20 October 2008) is a British long jumper.

== Biography ==
From Harrow, London, he won gold in the long jump at the U18 England Athletics Indoor National Championships in February 2025, with a jump of 6.93 metres.

Emegbor set a new British Under-17 record with a leap of 7.80m at the English Schools Athletics Championships in July 2025. Aged 16 years old, his 7.80m jump won him the gold medal and also set a new championship best. He placed fifth on his international debut in the final at the 2025 European Athletics U20 Championships in Tampere, Finland on 8 August 2025. He was nominated for British under-20 male athlete of the year by Athletics Weekly in November 2025.

In February 2026, he won the England Athletics U20 Indoor Championships title with a jump of 7.73 metres in Sheffield. The following week, he jumped 7.50 metres to place third at the 2026 British Indoor Athletics Championships in Birmingham, three centimetres behind the event winner Alessandro Schenini. He won in June at the Mannheim International Gala, with a jump of 7.68m and won the English Schools senior title the following month with a championship record 7.82 metres. He was selected as part of the Great Britain team to compete at the 2026 World Athletics U20 Championships, qualifying for the final with a jump of 7.59 metres prior to placing seventh overall. In October 2026, he was selected for the 2026/27 Olympic Futures Programme awarded by UK Athletics.
