= Le'Ezra Brown =

American hurdler

Personal information
- Born: March 6, 2007 (age 19)

Sport
- Sport: Athletics
- Event: Hurdles
Medal record
Men's athletics
Representing the United States
World U20 Championships
Gold medal – first place	2026 Eugene	110m hurdles

Le'Ezra Brown (born March 6, 2007) is an American hurdler. In August 2026, he equalled the world under-20 record in the 110 metres hurdles, with a time of 12.72 seconds to win the 2026 World Athletics U20 Championships.

== Biography ==
From Dudley, North Carolina, Brown won the national age-group title in the 110 metres hurdles at the AAU Junior Olympics in June 2024. He was named the North Carolina Gatorade Boys Track and Field Athlete of the Year for consecutive years in 2024 and 2025.

Brown subsequently competed for the University of Georgia. In 2026, he was a semi-finalist in the 60 metres hurdles at the 2026 NCAA Division I Indoor Track and Field Championships, running a personal best 7.56 seconds. In June, he was also a semi-finalist over 110 metres hurdles at the 2026 Outdoor NCAA Championships.

On June 19, 2026, Brown broke the American under-20 national record in the 110 metres hurdles, with a time of 12.95 seconds in the preliminary round at the USATF U20 Championships, surpassing the previous best mark set by future world record holder Ja'Kobe Tharp. In the final, he placed second to Zacchaeus Brocks with both running 12.98 seconds. Competing at the 2026 World Athletics U20 Championships in Eugene, Brown broke his own American U20 record with 12.89 in the preliminary round before winning his semi-final with a wind-aided 12.82 (+2.7). He won the gold medal in the final, equalling the Sasha Zhoya world under-20 record of 12.72 seconds set when winning the corresponding race in 2021.
