= Roko Farkaš =

Croatian athlete

Personal information
- Nationality: Croatian
- Born: 11 February 2005 (age 21) Nedelišće, Croatia

Sport
- Sport: Athletics
- Event(s): Sprint, Long jump, Decathlon

Achievements and titles
- Personal bests: 100 m: 10.44 (2022); 200 m: 20.70 (2024) NR; 400 m: 47.57 (2024); 110 m hurdles: 14.18 (2023); Long jump: 8.15m (2024) NU20R; High jump: 2.03m (2023); Pole Vault: 4.10m (2024); Javelin: 54.10m (2023)
Medal record
Men's athletics
Representing Croatia
World U20 Championships
Gold medal – first place	2024 Lima	Long jump

Roko Farkaš (born 11 February 2005) is a Croatian multi-event athlete. He has won multiple senior national titles in sprint events and is the national record holder over 200 metres. In 2025, he became Croatian indoor champion in the heptathlon. In 2024, he won the gold medal at the World U20 Championships in the long jump.

== Career ==
He competed at the 2024 European Athletics Championships in Rome in June 2024, over 200 metres and set a new Croatian national record time of 20.70 seconds in reaching the semi-finals, beating the previous record set by Željko Knapić 43 years previously. He is the Croatian U20 record in the decathlon with 7300 points, but an injury suffered during the 2024 summer season caused him to focus on the long jump for the rest of that year. Competing in the long jump at the 2024 World Athletics U20 Championships in August 2024, he set a new Croatian U20 record of 8.15 metres to qualify for the final. In the final, he jumped a wind-assisted 8.17 metres in the fourth round to win the gold medal. In September 2024, he was nominated for the European Athletics Rising Star award.

He won the heptathlon at the Croatian Indoors Combined Events Championships in Zagreb in February 2025 with a tally of 5713 points. He competed in the long jump at the 2025 European Athletics Indoor Championships in Apeldoorn, Netherlands. He placed eleventh in qualifying with an 7.70 metres jump, and did not proceed to the final.

He was selected to represent Croatia in the decathlon at the 2025 European Athletics U23 Championships in Bergen, Norway, and led the competition after the first day but suffered an injury during the pole vault and was unable to complete the competition. In September 2025, he competed in the long jump at the 2025 World Championships in Tokyo, Japan, without advancing to the final.

== Personal life ==
He is from Nedelišće. He is a member of Varaždin Sloboda in the city of Varaždin in Croatia.
