= 2023 Asian Athletics Championships – Men's 4 × 400 metres relay =

Men's 4 × 400 metres relay at the 2023 Asian Athletics Championships
- Venue: National Stadium
- Location: Bangkok, Thailand
- Dates: 15 July (heats); 16 July (final)
- Nations: 9
- Winning time: 3:01.56 CR, NR

Medalists
gold medal	Aruna Dharshana; Rajitha Niranjan; Pabasara Niku; Kalinga Kumarage; Pasindu Kodikara*	Sri Lanka
silver medal	Amoj Jacob; Muhammed Variyathodi; Mijo Kurian; Rajesh Ramesh; Rahul Kadam*; Nihal William*	India
bronze medal	Bassem Hemeida; Abubaker Abdalla; Ismail Abakar; Ashraf Osman; Abdirahman Hassan*; Doudai Oumar*	Qatar

The men's 4 × 400 metres relay event at the 2023 Asian Athletics Championships was held on 15 and 16 July.

== Results ==
=== Heats ===
Qualification rule: First 3 in each heat (Q) and the next 2 fastest (q) qualified for the final.

Rank	Heat	Nation	Athletes	Time	Notes
1	1	India	Amoj Jacob, Nihal William, Mijo Kurian, Rahul Kadam	3:04.38	Q
2	1	Sri Lanka	Pabasara Niku, Pasindu Kodikara, Rajitha Niranjan, Kalinga Kumarage	3:04.62	Q
3	2	Philippines	Umajesty Williams, Michael Del Prado, Joyme Sequita, Frederick Ramirez	3:07.40	Q
4	2	Iraq	Yasir Ali Al-Saadi, Mohammed Al-Lami, Mohammed Al-Tameemi, Taha Hussein Yaseen	3:08.73	Q
5	1	Thailand	Aphisit Chumsri, Lucky Yooyamadu, Jirayu Pleenaram, Thawatchai Heem-Ead	3:09.44	Q
6	2	Qatar	Doudai Oumar, Abubaker Abdalla, Ismail Abakar, Ashraf Osman	3:10.49	Q
7	2	Malaysia	Abdul Wafiy, Muhammad Firdaus Bin Mohamad Zemi, Rusleen Zikry Putra Roseli, Umar Osman	3:10.62	q
8	2	Singapore	Ng Chin Hui, Jun Jie Calvin Quek, Zubin Percy Muncherji, Thiruben Thana Rajan	3:11.65	q
9	1	Kazakhstan	Andrey Sokolov, Dmitriy Koblov, Vyacheslav Zems, Mikhail Litvin	3:11.70	

=== Final ===
Rank	Lane	Team	Name	Time	Notes
1st place, gold medalist(s)	4	Sri Lanka	Aruna Dharshana, Rajitha Niranjan, Pabasara Niku, Kalinga Kumarage	3:01.56	CR, NR
2nd place, silver medalist(s)	5	India	Amoj Jacob, Muhammed Variyathodi, Mijo Kurian, Rajesh Ramesh	3:01.80	
3rd place, bronze medalist(s)	8	Qatar	Bassem Hemeida, Abubaker Abdalla, Ismail Abakar, Ashraf Osman	3:04.26	
4	6	Iraq	Yasir Ali Al-Saadi, Mohammed Al-Lami, Mohammed Al-Tameemi, Taha Hussein Yaseen	3:04.94	NR
5	7	Thailand	Aphisit Chumsri, Sarawut Nuansri, Jirayu Pleenaram, Joshua Atkinson	3:05.63	
6	3	Philippines	Umajesty Williams, Michael Del Prado, Joyme Sequita, Frederick Ramirez	3:06.47	NR
7	1	Malaysia	Abdul Wafiy, Muhammad Firdaus Bin Mohamad Zemi, Rusleen Zikry Putra Roseli, Umar Osman	3:11.63	
	2	Singapore		DNS	
