= Neeru Pathak =

Indian athlete (born 2007)

Neeru Pathak (born 27 January 2007) is an Indian athlete who specialises in 400 metre run. She qualified to represent India in women's 4×400 metre event at the 2026 Asian Games at Nagoya, Aichi Prefecture, Japan from 19 September to 4 October 2026.

== Early life ==
Pathak is from Gadakhera village, Aligarh district, Uttar Pradesh. Her father, Rajbir Sharma, is a farmer. She is one of the seven sisters. With no synthetic track in Aligarh, her coach sent her to train under Vishal Saxena, in Meerut, where she lived in a single room accommodation. Before Asian Games she trained at the Sports Authority of India cente in Bhubaneswar.

== Career ==
In September 2025, she won a gold medal at the 64th National Open Athletics Championships at Sree Kanteerava outdoor stadium in Bengaluru. In October 2025, she won the U20 gold in the 400m run with a time of 53.38 seconds at the National Junior Athletics Championships at Bhubaneswar.

In July 2026, she represented India in the mixed 4 × 400 m relay team which finished sixth at the Commonwealth Games in Glasgow. In 2026, she was part of the Indian team that won the gold in the women's 4×100 metres relay at the Asian Relay Championships. In May 2026, she won a bronze medal in the women's 400 metes with a time of 53.23 seconds at the U20 Asian Athletics Championships 2026.
