= Josephine Sembeyo Mancha =

Kenyan athlete (born 2007)

Personal information
- Nationality: Kenyan
- Born: 8 August 2007 (age 19)

Sport
- Sport: Athletics
- Event: Middle-distance running
Medal record
Women's athletics
Representing Kenya
World U20 Championships
Gold medal – first place	2026 Eugene	1500 m

Josephine Sembeyo Mancha (born 8 August 2007) is a Kenyan middle-distance runner. She won a gold medal in the 1500 metres at the 2026 World Athletics U20 Championships.

== Career ==
Sembeyo began running in 2022. In August 2026, she competed at the 2026 World Athletics U20 Championships in the 1500 metres. During the heats she finished in first with a time of 4:12.21 and advanced to the finals. During the final she won a gold medal with a time of 4:16.73.
