= Ellery Lincoln =

American middle-distance runner

Personal information
- Born: 23 January 2009 (age 17)

Sport
- Sport: Athletics
- Event: Middle-distance running

Ellery Lincoln (born 23 January 2009) is an American middle-distance runner.

== Biography ==
From Portland, Oregon, Lincoln is the daughter of American international runners Sarah Schwald and Daniel Lincoln, but found her own path into running while in middle school. She was later educated at Lincoln High School. In 2026, she committed to attend the University of Oregon.

Lincoln won the Oregon Class 6A 1500 metres race at the OSAA track and field state championship meet on May 18, 2024 at Hayward Field. However, her 2025 season was disrupted by illness.

Lincoln set a new state high school record she set in April 2026 at the Jesuit Twilight Relays of 4:30.00 for the mile run. She moved to third in her age-group on the American all-time list for the mile run in June 2026, with 4:27.65 in St. Louis at the Hoka Festival of Miles, moving behind only Jane Hedengren and Sadie Engelhardt. On 19 June, she placed second in the 1500 metres at the 2026 USA U20 Championships, running 4:07.99. The following month, she was entered into that distance at the 2026 Prefontaine Classic where she ran 4:07.06 to place eighth, moving to fourth all-time on the high school outdoor list. She was selected to represent her country at the 2026 World Athletics U20 Championships, qualifying for the final of the 1500 metres and placing fifth overall. On 3 October 2026, Lincoln opened her senior cross country season with a win at the Chile Pepper Cross Country Festival in Fayetteville, Arkansas.
