= Daniele Inzoli =

Italian long jumper (born 2008)

Personal information
- Full name: Daniele Leonardo Inzoli
- National team: Italy
- Born: 12 August 2008 (age 18) Milan, Italy
- Height: 1.87 m (6 ft 2 in)
- Weight: 70 kg (154 lb)

Sport
- Sport: Athletics
- Event: Long jump
- Club: Atletica Riccardi

Achievements and titles
- Personal best: Long jump: 8.15m (2026)
Medal record
Men's athletics
Representing ITA
World U20 Championships
Gold medal – first place	2026 Eugene	Long jump
European U20 Championships
Silver medal – second place	2025 Tampere	Long jump
European U18 Championships
Bronze medal – third place	2024 Banska Bystrica	Long jump

Daniele Leonardo Inzoli (born 12 August 2008) is an Italian long jumper. He won the Italian Athletics Indoor Championships in 2025, at the age of 16 years-old and won the 2026 World Athletics U20 Championships the following year.

== Biography ==
In June 2023, he attained the world best performance ever recorded by a 14-year-old in the long jump, when he jumped 7.48 metres competing in Parma, Italy.

He became the Italian U18 100m champion in 2024. In May 2024, he lengthened his personal best in the long jump to 7.90 metres competing in Savona, Italy, as a 15 year-old. This was an under-16 world best, and improved by five centimetres the previous best set by Cuban Maykel Massò on February 13, 2015 in Havana, Cuba.

He won the bronze medal at the 2024 European Athletics U18 Championships in Banská Bystrica, Slovakia, with a jump of 7.54 metres in July 2024. He subsequently competed at the World Athletics U20 Championships in Lima, Peru, in August 2024, shortly after his sixteenth birthday, but did not progress to the final, with a best jump of 6.87 metres. He also competed with the Italian team in the 4 x 100 metres relay race at the championships, but they finished in sixth place in their heat and did not qualify for the final.

In February 2025, he won the long jump title at the Italian Athletics Indoor Championships with a lifetime best of 7.93 metres, at the age of 16 years-old. At the 2025 European Athletics U20 Championships in Tampere, Finland, he reached the final with a single jump in qualification of 7.63 metres, before winning the silver medal with a jump of 7.69m.

Competing at the 2026 World Athletics U20 Championships in Eugene, USA, he qualified for the final with a personal best of 8.15 metres in the preliminary round. He won the gold medal in the final with a jump of 7.97 metres, winning by a single centimetre from Australia Mason McGroder. He was nominated for European Athletics Men’s Rising Star for 2026.

== Personal life ==
He is from Lombardy. His brother Francesco is also a long jumper, who won the bronze medal in the long jump at the 2022 European Athletics U18 Championships. They are both members of Atletica Riccardi Milano 1946 athletics club in Milan.

=== National titles ===
Inzoli won a national championship at individual senior level.

- Italian Athletics Indoor Championships
  - Long jump: 2025
