= Asian U20 Athletics Championships =

U20 athletics event in Asia

- Status: active
- Genre: sports event
- Date: midyear
- Frequency: biannual
- Inaugurated: 1986
- Organiser: AAA

The Asian U20 Athletics Championships (formerly Asian Junior Athletics Championships) are the Asian championships open for those of age according to junior. It is currently organized by the Asian Athletics Association.

== Editions ==
Edition	Year	Events	Host City	Host Country	Dates
1	1986	40	Jakarta	Indonesia	4–7 December
2	1988	40	Singapore	Singapore	8–11 September
3	1990	40	Beijing	China	13–16 June
4	1992	40	New Delhi	India	2–5 December
5	1994	41	Jakarta	Indonesia	17–20 September
6	1996	41	New Delhi	India	3–6 December
7	1997	41	Bangkok	Thailand	4–7 November
8	1999	43	Singapore	Singapore	30 September – 3 October
9	2001	43	Bandar Seri Begawan	Brunei	19–22 July
10	2002	43	Bangkok	Thailand	28–31 October
11	2004	43	Ipoh	Malaysia	12–15 June
12	2006	43	Macau	Macau	15–18 July
13	2008	44	Jakarta	Indonesia	12–15 July
14	2010	44	Hanoi	Vietnam	1–4 July
15	2012	44	Colombo	Sri Lanka	9–12 June
16	2014	44	Taipei	Taiwan	12–15 June
17	2016	44	Ho Chi Minh City	Vietnam	3–6 June
18	2018	44	Gifu	Japan	7–10 June
19	~~2020~~	~~44~~	~~Bangkok~~	~~Thailand~~	~~14–17 May~~
19	~~2020~~	~~44~~	Cancelled due to COVID-19 pandemic		
20	2023	45	Yecheon	South Korea	4–7 June
21	2024	45	Dubai	United Arab Emirates	24–27 April
22	2026	45	Hong Kong	Hong Kong	28–31 May

== Championship records ==
=== Men ===
Event	Record	Athlete	Nationality	Date	Championships	Location	Ref.
100 m	10.15 (+1.7 m/s)	Zeng Keli	China	25 April 2024	2024 Championships	Dubai, United Arab Emirates	
200 m	20.63 (+1.0 m/s)	Mohammad Hossein Abareghi	Iran	14 June 2014	2014 Championships	Taipei, Taiwan	
400 m	44.85 NR	Suleiman Abdulrahman	United Arab Emirates	29 May 2026	2026 Championships	Hong Kong, China	
800 m	1:46.56	Teng Haining	China	12 June 2012	2012 Championships	Colombo, Sri Lanka	
1500 m	3:39.85	Hamza Driouch	Qatar	10 June 2012	2012 Championships	Colombo, Sri Lanka	
3000 m	8:16.06	Yota Mashiko	Japan	27 April 2024	2024 Championships	Dubai, United Arab Emirates	
5000 m	14:08.71	Sota Orita	Japan	25 April 2024	2024 Championships	Dubai, United Arab Emirates	
10,000 m	30:00.27	Ryu Ok-hyon	North Korea	4 December 1986	1986 Championships	Jakarta, Indonesia	
110 m hurdles (99 cm)	13.05 (−0.5 m/s)	Jeremy Koga	Japan	29 May 2026	2026 Championships	Hong Kong, China	
400 m hurdles	49.25	Taiju Goto	Japan	30 May 2026	2026 Championships	Hong Kong, China	
3000 m steeplechase	8:33.39	Musa Amer Obaid	Qatar	13 June 2004	2004 Championships	Ipoh, Malaysia	
High jump	2.31 m	Mutaz Essa Barshim	Qatar	3 July 2010	2010 Championships	Hanoi, Vietnam	
Pole vault	5.51 m	Seif Heneida	Qatar	26 April 2024	2024 Championships	Dubai, United Arab Emirates	
Long jump	8.05 m (+1.2 m/s)	Weng Yongfeng	China	13 July 2008	2008 Championships	Jakarta, Indonesia	
Triple jump	16.73 m	Gu Junjie	China	31 October 2002	2002 Championships	Bangkok, Thailand	
Shot put (6 kg)	19.99 m	Mehdi Shahrokhi	Iran	12 June 2004	2004 Championships	Ipoh, Malaysia	
Shot put (6 kg)	20.29 m (Note: ambiguous, mark is not ratified by AAA as CR)	Khalid Habash Al-Suwaidi	Qatar	October 2002	2002 Championships	Bangkok, Thailand	
Discus throw (1.75 kg)	62.29 m	Hossein Rasouli	Iran	9 June 2018	2018 Championships	Gifu, Japan	
Discus throw (1.75 kg)	63.17 m (Note: ambiguous, mark is not ratified by AAA as CR)	Khalid Habash Al-Suwaidi	Qatar	October 2002	2002 Championships	Bangkok, Thailand	
Hammer throw (6 kg)	80.85 m	Ashraf Amgad Elseify	Qatar	11 June 2012	2012 Championships	Colombo, Sri Lanka	
Javelin throw	77.97 m	Junya Sado	Japan	6 June 2016	2016 Championships	Ho Chi Minh City, Vietnam	
Decathlon	7713 pts	Yu Bin	China	12–13 June 2004	2004 Championships	Ipoh, Malaysia	
Decathlon	100m (wind) / Long jump (wind) / Shot put / High jump / 400m / 110m H (wind) / Discus / Pole vault / Javelin / 1500m; 10.97 / 7.44 m / 15.00 m / 1.90 m / 50.03 / 15.33 / 44.85 m / 4.40 m / 62.78 m / 5:06.24						
10,000 m walk (track)	42:00.53	Fumihiro Kobayashi	Japan	31 October 2002	2002 Championships	Bangkok, Thailand	
4 × 100 m relay	39.30	Masaya Aikawa; Yasutaka Matsunaga; Shinji Takahira; Hiroyuki Noda	Japan	28 October 2002	2002 Championships	Bangkok, Thailand	
4 × 400 m relay	3:04.88	Ye Weixin; Li Yongjie; Yang Jia; Xu Xinlong	China	31 May 2026	2026 Championships	Hong Kong, China	

=== Women ===
Event	Record	Athlete	Nationality	Date	Championships	Location	Ref.
100 m	11.32 (+0.7 m/s) AYR	Chen Yujie	China	25 April 2024	2024 Championships	Dubai, United Arab Emirates	
200 m	23.16	Susanthika Jayasinghe	Sri Lanka	20 September 1994	1994 Championships	Jakarta, Indonesia	
400 m	52.66	Tang Xiaoyin	China	13 June 2004	2004 Championships	Ipoh, Malaysia	
800 m	2:02.66	Lang Yinglai	China	5 November 1997	1997 Championships	Bangkok, Thailand	
1500 m	4:11.89	Qu Yunxia	China	14 June 1990	1990 Championships	Beijing, China	
3000 m	9:04.36	Nozomi Tanaka	Japan	10 June 2018	2018 Championships	Gifu, Japan	
5000 m	16:07.74	Haruka Kyuma	Japan	9 June 2012	2012 Championships	Colombo, Sri Lanka	
100 m hurdles	13.45	Zhang Yu	China	16 June 1990	1990 Championships	Beijing, China	
100 m hurdles	13.45 (+0.9 m/s)	Yuiri Yoshida	Japan	9 June 2018	2018 Championships	Gifu, Japan	
400 m hurdles	56.60	Wang Xing	China	14 June 2004	2004 Championships	Ipoh, Malaysia	
3000 m steeplechase	10:21.04	Chika Mukai	Japan	6 June 2016	2016 Championships	Ho Chi Minh City, Vietnam	
High jump	1.90 m	Svetlana Radzivil	Uzbekistan	16 July 2006	2006 Championships	Macau	
Pole vault	4.25 m	Xu Huiqin	China	11 June 2012	2012 Championships	Colombo, Sri Lanka	
Long jump	6.56 m	Wang Kuo-huei	Taiwan	5 November 1997	1997 Championships	Bangkok, Thailand	
Triple jump	14.23 m	Li Jiahui	China	5 November 1997	1997 Championships	Bangkok, Thailand	
Shot put	18.66 m	Qiu Qiaoping	China	16 June 1990	1990 Championships	Beijing, China	
Discus throw	62.54 m	Xu Shaoyang	China	30 October 2002	2002 Championships	Bangkok, Thailand	
Hammer throw	66.10 m	Zhang Wenxiu	China	28 October 2002	2002 Championships	Bangkok, Thailand	
Javelin throw	60.74 m	Sun Xiurong	China	6 December 1986	1986 Championships	Jakarta, Indonesia	
Heptathlon	5557 pts	Irina Naumenko	Kazakhstan	30 September – 1 October 1999	1999 Championships	Singapore	
Heptathlon	100m H (wind) / High jump / Shot put / 200m (wind) / Long jump (wind) / Javelin / 800m; 14.31 / 1.79 m / 11.93 m / 24.93 / 5.91 m / 33.30 m / 2:25.84						
10,000 m walk (track)	45:20.59	Ma Li	China	7 June 2018	2018 Championships	Gifu, Japan	
4 × 100 m relay	44.75	Gao Chunxia; Yen Jie; Feng Jie; Wang Jing	China	20 September 1994	1994 Championships	Jakarta, Indonesia	
4 × 400 m relay	3:38.20	Ayano Shiomi; Kasumi Yoshida; Natsumi Murakami; Ayaka Kawata	Japan	10 June 2018	2018 Championships	Gifu, Japan	

=== Mixed ===
Event	Record	Athlete	Nationality	Date	Championships	Location	Ref.
4 × 400 m relay	3:22.46	Ailixier Wumaier; Wang Yalun; Li Yiqing; Liu Yinglan	China	26 April 2024	2024 Championships	Dubai, United Arab Emirates	

== Records in defunct events ==
=== Men's events ===
Event	Record	Name	Nation	Date	Meet	Location	Ref.
2000 m steeplechase	5:44.15	Hiroyuki Itabashi	Japan	September 1988	1988 Championships	Singapore	

=== Women's events ===
Event	Record	Name	Nation	Date	Meet	Location	Ref.
5000 m walk (track)	21:45.24	Wang Yuntao	China	November 1997	1997 Championships	Bangkok, Thailand	
10,000 m	33:55.45	Rika Ota	Japan	June 1990	1990 Championships	Beijing, China	

== Medals (1986-2026) ==
Rank	Nation	Gold	Silver	Bronze	Total
1	China (CHN)	335	213	111	659
2	Japan (JPN)	165	157	173	495
3	India (IND)	72	103	116	291
4	Qatar (QAT)	71	43	30	144
5	Chinese Taipei (TPE)	56	77	100	233
6	South Korea (KOR)	29	53	63	145
7	Thailand (THA)	28	39	32	99
8	Kazakhstan (KAZ)	18	34	39	91
9	Saudi Arabia (KSA)	17	27	18	62
10	Uzbekistan (UZB)	16	22	20	58
11	Iran (IRI)	14	19	33	66
12	Sri Lanka (SRI)	11	19	18	48
13	North Korea (PRK)	9	15	19	43
14	Bahrain (BHR)	8	6	4	18
15	United Arab Emirates (UAE)	6	3	1	10
16	Malaysia (MAS)	5	12	21	38
17	Vietnam (VIE)	5	8	13	26
18	Kuwait (KUW)	5	6	8	19
19	Iraq (IRQ)	5	4	7	16
20	Kyrgyzstan (KGZ)	5	1	4	10
21	Hong Kong (HKG)	4	10	17	31
22	Tajikistan (TJK)	4	1	2	7
23	Syria (SYR)	3	2	2	7
24	Indonesia (INA)	2	10	14	26
25	Oman (OMA)	2	2	1	5
26	Turkmenistan (TKM)	2	0	0	2
27	Pakistan (PAK)	0	7	4	11
28	Singapore (SIN)	0	1	10	11
29	Bangladesh (BAN)	0	1	2	3
30	Jordan (JOR)	0	1	1	2
30	Philippines (PHI)	0	1	1	2
32	Lebanon (LBN)	0	1	0	1
33	Azerbaijan (AZE)	0	0	2	2
33	Yemen (YEM)	0	0	2	2
35	Brunei (BRU)	0	0	1	1
35	Mongolia (MGL)	0	0	1	1
35	Myanmar (MYA)	0	0	1	1
35	Palestine (PLE)	0	0	1	1
Totals (38 entries)		897	898	892	2,687

== See also ==
- Asian Youth Athletics Championships
- Asian Athletics Championships
