= India at the 2021 World Athletics U20 Championships =

- WA code: IND
- Website: indianathletics.in

in Nairobi
- Competitors: 28 in 19 events
- Medals Ranked 21st: Gold 0 Silver 2 Bronze 1 Total 3

World Athletics U20 Championships appearances
- auto

India competed at the 2021 World Athletics U20 Championships in Nairobi, Kenya, from 18 to 22 August 2021.

== Medalists ==
Medal	Name	Event	Date
Silver	Shaili Singh	Long jump	22 August
Silver	Amit	10,000 m race walk	21 August
Bronze	Abdul Razak Priya Mohan Summy Kapil Bharath S	Mixed 4 x 400 m relay	18 August

== Results ==
(q – qualified, NM – no mark, SB – season-best)

=== Men ===
Track and road events

Athlete	Event	Heat		Semifinal		Final	
Athlete	Event	Result	Rank	Result	Rank	Result	Rank
Nalubothu Srinivas	200 metres	21.33	5	Did not advance			
Anu Kumar	800 metres	1:50.26	17	Did not advance			
Sunil Joliya	3000 metres steeplechase	9:49.23	11	Did not advance			
Tejas Shirse	110 m hurdles	13.87	5	Did not advance			
Hardeep Kumar	400 m hurdles	1:12.80	5	Did not advance			
Rohan Kamble	400 m hurdles	55.00	4 Q	52.88	7	Did not advance	
Amit	10,000 m race walk	—				42:17.94	2nd place, silver medalist(s)
Bharath S Kapil Abdul Razak Sumit Chahal Nagarjunan S	4 x 400 m relay	3:10.62	6	Did not advance			

Field events

Athlete	Event	Qualification		Final	
Athlete	Event	Distance	Position	Distance	Position
Amandeep Dhaliwal	Shot put	17.92	11 q	17.08	12
Kunwer Rana	Javelin throw	71.05	6 q	73.68	5
Ajay Kumar	Javelin throw	70.34	7 q	70.74	6
Vipin Kumar	Hammer throw	63.17	20	Did not advance	
Donald. M	Triple jump	—		15.82m	4

=== Women ===
Track and road events

Athlete	Event	Heat		Semifinal		Final	
Athlete	Event	Result	Rank	Result	Rank	Result	Rank
Priya Mohan	400 metres	53.79	3 q	—		52.77 PB	4
Summy	400 metres	55.43	5	Did not advance			
Pooja	800 metres	2:10.66	6	Did not advance			
Pooja	1500 metres	4.37.85	11	—		Did not advance	
Ankita Dhyani	5000 metres	—				17:17.68	6
Nandini Agasara	100 m hurdles	14.18	4 Q	14.19	6	Did not advance	
Baljeet Bajwa	10,000 m race walk	—				48:58.17	7
Priya Mohan Summy Payal Vohra Deepanshi Kunja Rajitha	4 x 400 m relay	—				3:40.45	4

Field events

Athlete	Event	Qualification		Final	
Athlete	Event	Distance	Position	Distance	Position
Shaili Singh	Long jump	6.40	1Q	6.59 w	2nd place, silver medalist(s)

=== Mixed ===
Track and road events

Athlete	Event	Heat		Semifinal		Final	
Athlete	Event	Result	Rank	Result	Rank	Result	Rank
Abdul Razak Priya Mohan Summy Kapil Bharath S	Mixed 4 x 400 m relay	3:23.39	1 Q	—		3:20.60	3rd place, bronze medalist(s)
