= 2026 Asian U23 Athletics Championships – Results =

These are the results of the 2026 Asian U23 Athletics Championships which took place between 9 and 12 July, at the Ordos Sports Development Center Stadium in Ordos City, China.

== Men's results ==
=== 100 metres ===
Heats – 9 July
Wind:
Heat 1: -0.6 m/s, Heat 2: -1.0 m/s, Heat 3: -1.0 m/s

Rank	Heat	Name	Nationality	Time	Notes
1	1	Muhammad Azeem Mohd Fahmi	Malaysia	10.15	Q
2	1	Liu Yulong	China	10.23	Q
2	2	Falah Al-Khazaali	Iraq	10.23	Q
4	2	Zeng Keli	China	10.30	Q
5	3	Xia Jianduo	China	10.35	Q
6	3	Dineth Induwara	Sri Lanka	10.36	Q
7	3	Salah Nur Ismail Yunis	Qatar	10.43	q
8	2	Magnus Johannsson	Hong Kong	10.46	q
9	1	Tate Tan Fung	Singapore	10.48	
10	1	Vibhaskar Kumar	India	10.50	
11	2	Hur Jeong-hyun	South Korea	10.56	
12	1	Sulton Gafurjonov	Uzbekistan	10.59	
12	3	Chung Tsz Sing	Hong Kong	10.59	
14	3	Kent Francis Jardin	Philippines	10.60	
15	2	Reeve Kua Man Hong	Malaysia	10.63	
16	3	Sam Vasanth	India	10.66	
17	2	Ong Ying Tat	Singapore	10.72	
18	1	Aadesh Kumar Yadav	Nepal	11.20	

Final – 9 July

Wind: -0.7 m/s

Rank	Lane	Name	Nationality	Time	Notes
1st place, gold medalist(s)	6	Muhammad Azeem Mohd Fahmi	Malaysia	10.17	
2nd place, silver medalist(s)	4	Falah Al-Khazaali	Iraq	10.21	NR
3rd place, bronze medalist(s)	9	Salah Nur Ismail Yunis	Qatar	10.23	
4	3	Xia Jianduo	China	10.24 (10.233)	
4	5	Zeng Keli	China	10.24 (10.233)	
6	7	Liu Yulong	China	10.26	
7	2	Magnus Johannsson	Hong Kong	10.44	
8	8	Dineth Induwara	Sri Lanka	10.55	

=== 200 metres ===
Heats – 10 July
Wind:
Heat 1: -1.0 m/s, Heat 2: -1.4 m/s

Rank	Heat	Name	Nationality	Time	Notes
1	1	Huang Youwen	China	20.84	Q
2	2	Kota Uematsu	Japan	20.96	Q
3	2	Abhay Singh	India	21.11	Q
4	1	Muhammad Azeem Mohd Fahmi	Malaysia	21.13	Q
5	1	Gokul Pandiyan	India	21.51	Q
6	1	Hur Jeong-hyun	South Korea	21.55	q
7	2	Pengiran Aidil Auf Hajam	Malaysia	21.55	Q
8	1	Teo Yan	Singapore	21.67	q
9	2	Donavan Yip	Singapore	21.90	
10	2	Lucas Chan Chun Yu	Hong Kong	21.93	
11	1	Sulton Gafurjonov	Uzbekistan	22.00	
12	2	Aadesh Kumar Yadav	Nepal	23.16	
	1	Yaqoub Mohamed Al-Azmi	Kuwait	DNF	
	2	Hamza Abdullah Al-Jabri	Oman	DNF	
	2	Falah Al-Khazaali	Iraq	DNS	

Final – 10 July

Wind: +2.2 m/s

Rank	Lane	Name	Nationality	Time	Notes
1st place, gold medalist(s)	6	Huang Youwen	China	20.43	
2nd place, silver medalist(s)	8	Kota Uematsu	Japan	20.58	
3rd place, bronze medalist(s)	7	Abhay Singh	India	20.96	
4	4	Pengiran Aidil Auf Hajam	Malaysia	21.15	
5	3	Hur Jeong-hyun	South Korea	21.19	
6	5	Gokul Pandiyan	India	21.25	
7	2	Teo Yan	Singapore	21.49	
	9	Muhammad Azeem Mohd Fahmi	Malaysia	DQ	TR16.8

=== 400 metres ===
Heats – 10 July

Rank	Heat	Name	Nationality	Time	Notes
1	1	Shinya Hayashi	Japan	46.33	Q
2	2	Tạ Ngọc Tưởng	Vietnam	46.51	Q
2	3	Astik Pradhan	India	46.51	Q
4	3	Shao Zhexuan	China	46.64	Q
5	1	Liang Wenqiang	China	46.65	Q
6	2	Shi Jun	China	46.76	Q
7	1	Mubarak Abdulkarim Musa	Qatar	46.83	q
8	1	Setu Mishra	India	47.28	q
9	3	Kalhara Idupa Kuruwitage	Sri Lanka	47.38	
10	2	Sho Tanabe	Japan	47.49	
11	3	Khalid Wadi Adoum	Qatar	47.93	
12	3	Kharis Lark Reil Pantonial	Philippines	48.33	
13	1	Hari Tamil Selvam Subaraghav	Singapore	48.52	
14	2	Huang Weijun	Singapore	49.34	
15	3	Zeek Suad Hussain	Maldives	49.37	
16	2	Ruslan Litovski	Kyrgyzstan	52.07	

Final – 11 July

Rank	Lane	Name	Nationality	Time	Notes
1st place, gold medalist(s)	5	Shinya Hayashi	Japan	45.26	
2nd place, silver medalist(s)	8	Tạ Ngọc Tưởng	Vietnam	45.50	NR
3rd place, bronze medalist(s)	6	Shao Zhexuan	China	45.92	
4	4	Shi Jun	China	46.27	
5	7	Astik Pradhan	India	46.33	
6	3	Mubarak Abdulkarim Musa	Qatar	47.21	
7	2	Setu Mishra	India	47.26	
8	9	Liang Wenqiang	China	47.45	

=== 800 metres ===
Heats – 9 July

Rank	Heat	Name	Nationality	Time	Notes
1	2	Hatim Oulghazi	Qatar	1:51.32	Q
2	2	Vinod Kumar	India	1:51.64	Q
3	2	Hussein Loraña	Philippines	1:52.82	Q
4	2	Jayden Tan Jie Cong	Singapore	1:57.32	q
5	2	Arsen Toktosunov	Kyrgyzstan	1:58.87	q
6	1	Chi Jianguo	China	1:59.53	Q
7	1	Han Tae-geon	South Korea	1:59.54	Q
8	1	Shakeel	India	1:59.57	Q
9	1	Alexander Zhigar	Kazakhstan	2:00.02	
10	1	Imran Bekchoroev	Kyrgyzstan	2:06.89	
11	1	Mujtaba Faqirzada	Afghanistan	2:15.18	

Final – 10 July

Rank	Name	Nationality	Time	Notes
1st place, gold medalist(s)	Hatim Oulghazi	Qatar	1:47.05	
2nd place, silver medalist(s)	Hussein Loraña	Philippines	1:47.65	
3rd place, bronze medalist(s)	Shakeel	India	1:48.78	
4	Vinod Kumar	India	1:49.10	
5	Chi Jianguo	China	1:52.49	
6	Han Tae-geon	South Korea	1:52.53	
7	Jayden Tan Jie Cong	Singapore	1:55.12	
8	Arsen Toktosunov	Kyrgyzstan	2:04.99	

=== 1500 metres ===
12 July

Rank	Name	Nationality	Time	Notes
1st place, gold medalist(s)	Takumi Shiobara	Japan	3:53.57	
2nd place, silver medalist(s)	Zakaria El Ahlaami	Qatar	3:54.11	
3rd place, bronze medalist(s)	Ryo Higuchi	Japan	3:54.55	
4	Sakir	India	3:54.77	
5	Sun Quan	China	3:58.07	
6	Ibrahim Abdullah Yahya	Iraq	3:58.22	
7	Oh Chang-ki	South Korea	4:00.78	
8	Arsen Toktosunov	Kyrgyzstan	4:15.03	
9	Imran Bekchoroev	Kyrgyzstan	4:17.92	
10	Mujtaba Faqirzada	Afghanistan	4:21.22	

=== 5000 metres ===
9 July

Rank	Name	Nationality	Time	Notes
1st place, gold medalist(s)	Rui Suzuki	Japan	4:01.24	
2nd place, silver medalist(s)	Shivaji Parashuram	India	14:08.19	
3rd place, bronze medalist(s)	Vinod Singh	India	14:23.67	
4	Kim Tae-hun	South Korea	14:29.29	
5	Jiang Jinzhi	China	14:39.67	
6	Sota Orita	Japan	15:02.19	
7	Liu Yadong	China	15:09.50	
8	Zainulabdeen Mokhles	Iraq	15:16.14	
9	Hsu Li-hung	Chinese Taipei	15:40.53	

=== 10,000 metres ===
11 July

Rank	Name	Nationality	Time	Notes
1st place, gold medalist(s)	Yoshihiro Kusuoka	Japan	29:29.34	
2nd place, silver medalist(s)	Shivaji Parashuram	India	29:33.54	
3rd place, bronze medalist(s)	Jiang Jinzhi	China	29:42.54	
4	Shailesh Kushwaha	India	30:46.78	
5	Liu Yadong	China	32:26.13	

=== 110 metres hurdles ===
Heats – 11 July
Wind:
Heat 1: +0.2 m/s, Heat 2: +0.1 m/s

Rank	Heat	Name	Nationality	Time	Notes
1	1	Zhao Shiqi	China	13.58	Q
2	2	Zhang Zijun	China	13.61	Q
3	1	Mohamad Armin Zahryl	Malaysia	13.63	Q, NR
4	2	Oumar Doudai Abakar	Qatar	13.68	Q
5	2	Elvin Zhi Xian Yap	Malaysia	13.72	Q
6	1	Sutthahathai Phrmbut	Thailand	13.99	Q
7	1	Liu Hiu Long	Hong Kong	14.06	q
7	2	Chou Cheng-hua	Chinese Taipei	14.06	q
9	2	Mak Tsz Ching	Hong Kong	14.72	
10	1	Jasim Al-Qanaei	Kuwait	14.95	
11	1	Phonesavanh Chanpaseuth	Laos	16.49	

Final – 12 July

Wind: +1.1 m/s

Rank	Lane	Name	Nationality	Time	Notes
1st place, gold medalist(s)	4	Zhao Shiqi	China	13.38	
2nd place, silver medalist(s)	7	Zhang Zijun	China	13.41	
3rd place, bronze medalist(s)	6	Oumar Doudai Abakar	Qatar	13.56	
4	5	Mohamad Armin Zahryl	Malaysia	13.58	NR
5	8	Elvin Zhi Xian Yap	Malaysia	13.85	
6	9	Liu Hiu Long	Hong Kong	14.04	
7	2	Chou Cheng-hua	Chinese Taipei	14.12	
8	3	Sutthahathai Phrmbut	Thailand	16.04	

=== 400 metres hurdles ===
Heats – 10 July

Rank	Heat	Name	Nationality	Time	Notes
1	1	Ye Anan	China	50.58	Q
2	2	Xu Xinfeng	China	50.72	Q
3	1	Ayomal Akalanka Kuda Liyanage	Sri Lanka	51.01	Q
4	2	Cho Sang-hyun	South Korea	51.21	Q
5	1	Mahamat Abakar Abdrahman	Qatar	51.90	Q
6	2	Muhammad Fakrul	Malaysia	52.59	Q
7	2	Jazzpeer Arcenal	Philippines	52.79	q
8	1	Muhammadrizoi Mirzozoda	Tajikistan	53.35	q
9	1	Cheong Chi-chong	Chinese Taipei	53.56	
10	2	Ben Tsang Kin Ho	Hong Kong	54.27	

Final – 11 July

Rank	Lane	Name	Nationality	Time	Notes
1st place, gold medalist(s)	8	Xu Xinfeng	China	48.68	=NR
2nd place, silver medalist(s)	7	Ayomal Akalanka Kuda Liyanage	Sri Lanka	49.03	NR
3rd place, bronze medalist(s)	6	Ye Anan	China	49.04	
4	5	Cho Sang-hyun	South Korea	50.74	
5	4	Mahamat Abakar Abdrahman	Qatar	50.77	
6	3	Jazzpeer Arcenal	Philippines	51.38	
7	2	Muhammadrizoi Mirzozoda	Tajikistan	53.67	
	9	Muhammad Fakrul	Malaysia	DNS	

=== 3000 metres steeplechase ===
10 July

Rank	Name	Nationality	Time	Notes
1st place, gold medalist(s)	Zakaria El Ahlaami	Qatar	8:54.32	
2nd place, silver medalist(s)	Tetsu Sasaki	Japan	8:56.99	
3rd place, bronze medalist(s)	Chen Wenjie	China	9:05.00	
4	Sharuk Khan	India	9:14.14	
5	Rinat Kulygin	Kazakhstan	9:31.52	
6	Ibrahim Abdullah Yahya	Iraq	9:35.11	
7	Lin Zhe-wei	Chinese Taipei	9:52.86	
8	Bagzhan Serikhan	Kazakhstan	10:08.42	
	Mustafa Mohsin	Iraq	DNF	

=== 4 × 100 metres relay ===
12 July

Rank	Lane	Nation	Competitors	Time	Notes
1st place, gold medalist(s)	5	China	Xia Jianduo, Liu Yulong, Chen Jiahao, Wu Haolin	38.38	
2nd place, silver medalist(s)	8	Hong Kong	James Chan, Cheng Cheung Hung, Magnus Johannsson, Chung Tsz Sing	38.88	
3rd place, bronze medalist(s)	7	Malaysia	Muhammad Azeem Mohd Fahmi, Reeve Man Hong Kua, Pengiran Aidil Auf Hajam, Mohamad Armin Zahryl	39.20	
4	6	India	Harsh Santosh Raut, Sam Vasanth, Vibhaskar Kumar, Laukik Melge	39.38	
5	4	Singapore	Ong Ying Tat, Tate Tan, Teo Yan, Donavan Yip	39.57	

=== 4 × 400 metres relay ===
12 July

Rank	Lane	Nation	Competitors	Time	Notes
1st place, gold medalist(s)	6	China	Shi Jun, Xiao Heng, Li Yifan, Shao Zhexuan	3:03.46	
2nd place, silver medalist(s)	8	India	Astik Pradhan, Sharan Megavarnam, Setu Mishra, Aman Choudhary	3:04.24	
3rd place, bronze medalist(s)	5	Qatar	Mahamat Abakar Abdrahman, Hatim Ait Oulghazi, Khalid Wadi Adoum, Mubarak Abdulkarim Musa	3:06.19	
4	7	Singapore	Liau Fong Jun, Jayden Tan Jie Cong, Huang Weijun, Hari Tamil Selvam Subaraghav	3:14.63	

=== Half marathon walk ===
12 July

Rank	Name	Nationality	Time	Notes	Penalties
1st place, gold medalist(s)	Sotaro Osaka	Japan	1:26:11		
2nd place, silver medalist(s)	Yang Kaiyuan	China	1:26:11		>>
3rd place, bronze medalist(s)	Taisei Yoshizako	Japan	1:27:15		>
4	Dou Huaian	China	1:34:02		>>~
5	Kim Ga-ram	South Korea	1:35:49		~~
6	Sachin Garhwal	India	1:36:48		~
7	Zhang Boyu	China	1:40:18		

> Bent knee
～ Loss of contact

=== High jump ===
12 July

Rank	Name	Nationality	2.00	2.05	2.10	2.13	2.16	2.18	Result	Notes
1st place, gold medalist(s)	Amir Nagayev	Uzbekistan	o	o	xo	xxo	xo	xxx	2.16	
2nd place, silver medalist(s)	Hu Chen	China	–	o	xo	o	xxx		2.13	
3rd place, bronze medalist(s)	Lo Tzu-chieh	Chinese Taipei	o	xo	xo	o	xxx		2.13	
4	Sota Haraguchi	Japan	–	o	xxo	xxx			2.10	
5	Sudeep	India	o	xo	xxo	xxx			2.10	
6	Daina Okamatsu	Japan	o	xxo	xxx				2.05	
7	Ho Ho Wai	Hong Kong	o	xxx					2.00	
8	Cheung Ming Hung	Hong Kong	xo	xxx					2.00	

=== Pole vault ===
11 July

Rank	Name	Nationality	5.05	5.20	5.35	5.45	5.76	Result	Notes
1st place, gold medalist(s)	Abdesalam Seifeldin Heneida	Qatar	–	o	o	o	xxx	5.45	
2nd place, silver medalist(s)	Liu Rui	China	xo	xo	xxx			5.20	
3rd place, bronze medalist(s)	Maxim Balabin	Kazakhstan	o	xxx				5.05	
4	Wu Yuankang	China	xo	xxx				5.05	
	Chen Zhipeng	China	xx–	x				NM	

=== Long jump ===
11 July

Rank	Name	Nationality	#1	#2	#3	#4	#5	#6	Result	Notes
1st place, gold medalist(s)	Xu Zhuofan	China	7.87	x	x	7.81	7.35	x	7.87	
2nd place, silver medalist(s)	Takuma Sekine	Japan	7.85	7.72	7.73	x	x	x	7.85	
3rd place, bronze medalist(s)	Wang Maisong	China	7.46	x	7.85	7.54	x	x	7.85	
4	Hong Yongtao	China	7.26	7.40	x	x	7.75	x	7.75	
5	Mohd. Atta Sazid	India	7.09	7.54	7.41	x	7.55	7.72	7.72	
6	Lin Ming Fu	Hong Kong	7.17	7.44	x	7.23	x	6.88	7.44	
7	Aziz Sobirov	Uzbekistan	7.24	x	7.05	x	6.93	x	7.24	
8	Feng Han Lin	Singapore	7.07	7.07	5.03	6.51	–	–	7.07	
9	Law Ngai Him	Hong Kong	x	7.01	6.89				7.01	
10	Kent Francis Jardin	Philippines	6.81	6.97	–				6.97	
	Lam Kuok Ngai	Macau	x	–	–				NM	
	Abdulrahman Al-Azemi	Kuwait							DNS	

=== Triple jump ===
9 July

Rank	Name	Nationality	#1	#2	#3	#4	#5	#6	Result	Notes
1st place, gold medalist(s)	Ma Yinglong	China	17.01	17.11	–	–	–	–	17.11	
2nd place, silver medalist(s)	Ibrokhim Mahkamov	Uzbekistan	x	16.34	16.18	x	x	x	16.34	
3rd place, bronze medalist(s)	Kim Dong-hyeak	South Korea	15.62	15.72	16.08	x	15.73	x	16.08	
4	Hồ Trọng Mạnh Hùng	Vietnam	15.95	x	15.24	x	15.42	15.39	15.95	
5	Mohamed Muhsin	India	x	15.80	x	15.02	15.28	15.47	15.80	
6	Ikhtiyor Akhmadjonov	Uzbekistan	x	x	15.38	x	x	x	15.38	
7	Huang Wei-lin	Chinese Taipei	x	14.66	x	14.88	x	15.16	15.16	

=== Shot put ===
10 July

Rank	Name	Nationality	#1	#2	#3	#4	#5	#6	Result	Notes
1st place, gold medalist(s)	Zhang Zhenyu	China	x	18.45	19.31	18.30	18.97	19.40	19.40	
2nd place, silver medalist(s)	Djibrine Adoum Ahmat	Qatar	15.66	16.62	17.38	17.63	17.75	17.58	17.75	
3rd place, bronze medalist(s)	Xia Guoyuan	China	15.66	16.62	17.38	17.63	17.75	17.58	17.75	
4	Husain Al-Nasser	Kuwait	x	17.02	x	17.11	x	x	17.11	
5	Zhang Yuzhe	China	x	15.67	16.53	16.85	x	16.45	16.85	
6	Eakkarin Boonlap	Thailand	x	16.56	16.23	x	16.77	x	16.77	
7	Hyogo Watanabe	Japan	16.20	x	16.53	16.58	x	16.47	16.77	

=== Discus throw ===
9 July

Rank	Name	Nationality	#1	#2	#3	#4	#5	#6	Result	Notes
1st place, gold medalist(s)	Li Zhixin	China	53.18	58.63	56.81	58.69	60.51	60.79	60.79	
2nd place, silver medalist(s)	Jiang Zehao	China	56.94	56.81	57.53	59.60	57.89	57.29	59.60	
3rd place, bronze medalist(s)	Bhartpreet Singh	India	x	51.13	x	50.76	52.91	x	52.91	
4	Kim Seong-woo	South Korea	45.73	47.76	46.27	52.05	51.29	51.76	52.05	

=== Hammer throw ===
9 July

Rank	Name	Nationality	#1	#2	#3	#4	#5	#6	Result	Notes
1st place, gold medalist(s)	Li Zixu	China	67.96	67.43	71.47	69.23	71.40	x	71.47	
2nd place, silver medalist(s)	Ayubkhon Fayezov	Uzbekistan	67.27	x	x	x	x	71.16	71.16	
3rd place, bronze medalist(s)	Xu Zheng	China	64.79	65.19	64.99	65.73	66.78	68.59	68.59	
4	Talal Al-Rushoud	Kuwait	61.06	60.13	62.24	x	64.73	62.11	64.73	
5	Ryoya Takahashi	Japan	x	x	63.48	62.30	63.07	x	63.48	
6	Harshit Kumar	India	53.25	56.79	57.44	51.92	x	x	57.44	
7	Mohammad Khan	Kuwait	49.30	x	x	x	r		49.30	

=== Javelin throw ===
9 July

Rank	Name	Nationality	#1	#2	#3	#4	#5	#6	Result	Notes
1st place, gold medalist(s)	Anand Singh	India	79.57	76.75	76.94	78.67	80.57	75.08	80.57	
2nd place, silver medalist(s)	Wang Xiaobo	China	76.04	77.68	77.35	79.41	x	78.05	79.41	
3rd place, bronze medalist(s)	Shivam Satish	India	75.24	74.86	x	75.78	77.70	x	77.70	
4	Cui Minghao	China	67.40	73.99	73.70	x	x	70.64	73.99	
5	Asadbek Murotov	Uzbekistan	73.84	73.86	73.46	x	x	69.51	73.86	
6	Jung Jun-seok	South Korea	x	71.39	72.35	x	72.27	x	72.35	
7	Wu Ping-shen	Chinese Taipei	65.44	x	–	66.66	66.62	x	66.66	

=== Decathlon ===
July 9–10

The highest mark recorded in each event is highlighted in yellow

Rank	Name	Nationality	100m	LJ	SP	HJ	400m	110m H	DT	PV	JT	1500m	Points	Notes
1st place, gold medalist(s)	Yuto Yamamoto	Japan	10.73	7.12	10.39	1.95	48.18	15.22	31.35	5.10	48.55	4:46.15	7395	
2nd place, silver medalist(s)	Wang Jiawei	China	11.48	7.02	12.56	2.04	51.38	14.35	37.72	4.70	55.58	5:21.89	7286	
3rd place, bronze medalist(s)	Zhu Chenghao	China	10.98	6.91	13.59	1.86	49.69	14.65	38.85	4.00	42.45	4:57.34	7071	
4	Abhijit Bhosale	India	11.40	6.45	11.66	1.83	51.68	16.67	35.68	4.00	57.68	4:50.37	6610	
5	Sultan Salah Al-Rayes	Kuwait	11.52	6.29	10.96	1.80	54.94	15.70	37.71	NM	46.42	DNF	5090	
	Nodir Norboyev	Uzbekistan	11.04	7.72	12.33	2.07	50.59	14.89	40.60	NM	DNS	–	DNF	
	Zhang Wenxi	China	10.62	6.86	13.03	1.92	DNS	–	–	–	–	–	DNF	
	Lee Yu-seong	South Korea	10.76	6.64	10.56	NM	DNS	–	–	–	–	–	DNF	

== Women's results ==
=== 100 metres ===
Heats – 9 July
Wind:
Heat 1: -1.6 m/s, Heat 2: -1.7 m/s

Rank	Heat	Name	Nationality	Time	Notes
1	1	Xue Kunzhi	China	11.41	Q
2	2	Liu Xiajun	China	11.58	Q
3	2	Aiha Yamagata	Japan	11.61	Q
4	1	Luo Tsz Yuen	Hong Kong	11.83	Q
5	1	Yang Mei-mei	Chinese Taipei	12.04	Q
5	2	Chloe Pak Hoi Man	Hong Kong	12.04	Q
7	1	Yekaterina Puzyreva	Kazakhstan	12.31	q
8	1	Benedette Leong	Singapore	12.40	q
9	2	Amanda Loo Si Hui	Singapore	12.41	
10	2	Otgon-erdene Dashchirev	Mongolia	12.96	

Final – 9 July

Wind: +0.7 m/s

Rank	Lane	Name	Nationality	Time	Notes
1st place, gold medalist(s)	4	Xue Kunzhi	China	11.37	
2nd place, silver medalist(s)	7	Aiha Yamagata	Japan	11.44	
3rd place, bronze medalist(s)	6	Liu Xiajun	China	11.53	
4	5	Luo Tsz Yuen	Hong Kong	11.79	
5	8	Chloe Pak Hoi Man	Hong Kong	11.88	
6	3	Yang Mei-mei	Chinese Taipei	12.04	
7	9	Yekaterina Puzyreva	Kazakhstan	12.24	
8	2	Benedette Leong	Singapore	12.31	

=== 200 metres ===
Heats – 10 July
Wind:
Heat 1: -1.1 m/s, Heat 2: -0.3 m/s

Rank	Heat	Name	Nationality	Time	Notes
1	2	Lê Thị Cẩm Tú	Vietnam	23.99	Q
2	1	Ami Takahashi	Japan	24.33	Q
3	2	Jiang Yutong	China	24.35	Q
4	2	Munkhkherlen Tsoodol	Mongolia	24.52	Q, NR
5	1	Li Huixian	China	24.58	Q
6	2	Laavinia Jaiganth	Singapore	24.74	q
7	2	Xue Kunzhi	China	24.95	q
8	1	Yang Mei-Mei	Chinese Taipei	25.20	Q
	1	Yekaterina Puzyreva	Kazakhstan	DQ	TR16.8
	1	Otgon-erdene Dashchirev	Mongolia	DNS	

Final – 10 July

Wind: +1.5 m/s

Rank	Lane	Name	Nationality	Time	Notes
1st place, gold medalist(s)	8	Jiang Yutong	China	23.47	
2nd place, silver medalist(s)	7	Lê Thị Cẩm Tú	Vietnam	23.50	
3rd place, bronze medalist(s)	6	Ami Takahashi	Japan	23.66	
4	5	Li Huixian	China	24.00	
5	9	Munkhkherlen Tsoodol	Mongolia	24.61	
6	4	Yang Mei-Mei	Chinese Taipei	24.85	
7	2	Laavinia Jaiganth	Singapore	25.09	
	3	Xue Kunzhi	China	DNS	

=== 400 metres ===
Heats – 10 July

Rank	Heat	Name	Nationality	Time	Notes
1	1	Naomi Johnson	Philippines	52.10	Q, NR
2	1	Jonbibi Hukmova	Uzbekistan	52.81	Q
3	1	Mariya Shuvalova	Kazakhstan	53.05	Q
4	1	Wang Shiyu	China	53.46	q
5	2	Jithma Wijethunga	Sri Lanka	53.94	Q
6	2	Li Xueqi	China	54.59	Q
7	2	Anna Shumilo	Kazakhstan	54.60	Q
8	2	Chen Jiajing	China	54.82	q
9	2	Arie Aoki	Japan	54.90	
10	1	Munkhkherlen Tsoodol	Mongolia	54.97	NR
11	1	Sandramol Sabu	India	55.00	
12	1	Laavinia Jaiganth	Singapore	57.97	
13	2	Aminath Layaana	Maldives	1:00.69	
	2	Lea Kriszeda Ordinario	Philippines	DQ	TR17.2.3

Final – 11 July

Rank	Lane	Name	Nationality	Time	Notes
1st place, gold medalist(s)	7	Jonbibi Hukmova	Uzbekistan	51.19	
2nd place, silver medalist(s)	5	Naomi Johnson	Philippines	52.34	
3rd place, bronze medalist(s)	6	Jithma Wijethunga	Sri Lanka	53.10	
4	4	Mariya Shuvalova	Kazakhstan	53.14	
5	2	Wang Shiyu	China	53.46	
6	9	Anna Shumilo	Kazakhstan	54.83	
7	3	Chen Jiajing	China	56.46	
8	8	Li Xueqi	China	59.96	

=== 800 metres ===
Heats – 9 July

Rank	Heat	Name	Nationality	Time	Notes
1	2	Jonbibi Hukmova	Uzbekistan	2:08.54	Q
2	2	Kurumi Sugure	Japan	2:08.79	Q
3	2	Ayana Bolatbekkyzy	Kazakhstan	2:09.43	Q
4	2	Vaishnavi Rawal	India	2:09.76	q
5	1	Zhu Gejing	China	2:10.49	Q
6	1	Bhumeshwory Devi Huidrom	India	2:10.60	Q
7	1	Yuri Nishida	Japan	2:10.86	Q
8	1	Takshima Nuhansa	Sri Lanka	2:10.99	q
9	2	Anna Korobovtseva	Kyrgyzstan	2:11.60	
10	1	Victoriya Sukachyova	Kazakhstan	2:12.10	
11	1	Park Woo-rim	South Korea	2:12.97	
12	2	Nguyễn Khánh Linh	Vietnam	2:14.59	
13	2	Khongorzul Enkhmaa	Mongolia	2:18.80	
14	1	Munguntuul Undrakh	Mongolia	2:52.97	

Final – 10 July

Rank	Name	Nationality	Time	Notes
1st place, gold medalist(s)	Jonbibi Hukmova	Uzbekistan	2:08.41	
2nd place, silver medalist(s)	Kurumi Sugure	Japan	2:09.42	
3rd place, bronze medalist(s)	Bhumeshwory Devi Huidrom	India	2:09.42	
4	Zhu Gejing	China	2:10.23	
5	Vaishnavi Rawal	India	2:10.83	
6	Ayana Bolatbekkyzy	Kazakhstan	2:11.35	
7	Yuri Nishida	Japan	2:12.08	
8	Takshima Nuhansa	Sri Lanka	2:12.78	

=== 1500 metres ===
12 July

Rank	Name	Nationality	Time	Notes
1st place, gold medalist(s)	Li Yuan	China	4:19.88	
2nd place, silver medalist(s)	Ye Shuqi	China	4:20.15	
3rd place, bronze medalist(s)	Airi Tajima	Japan	4:21.09	
4	Ayana Bolatbekkyzy	Kazakhstan	4:22.92	
5	Nurmamet Akbayan	Kazakhstan	4:23.33	
6	Mana Aiba	Japan	4:25.01	
7	Bhumeshwory Devi Huidrom	India	4:29.74	
8	Nguyễn Khánh Linh	Vietnam	4:29.81	
9	Khongorzul Enkhmaa	Mongolia	5:05.53	
10	Aiym Ozgorushova	Kyrgyzstan	5:06.85	

=== 5000 metres ===
10 July

Rank	Name	Nationality	Time	Notes
1st place, gold medalist(s)	Li Yuan	China	16:45.07	
2nd place, silver medalist(s)	Koharu Chugo	Japan	16:50.62	
3rd place, bronze medalist(s)	Lê Thị Tuyết	Vietnam	17:05.30	
4	Hoàng Thị Ngọc Ánh	Vietnam	18:32.24	
5	Aiym Ozgorushova	Kyrgyzstan	18:58.90	

=== 10,000 metres ===
12 July

Rank	Name	Nationality	Time	Notes
1st place, gold medalist(s)	Kana Mizumoto	Japan	33:24.87	
2nd place, silver medalist(s)	Yang Yiting	China	33:43.54	
3rd place, bronze medalist(s)	Lê Thị Tuyết	Vietnam	34:47.53	
4	Yang Hai	China	38:52.20	
	Edna Magtubo	Philippines	DNF	

=== 100 metres hurdles ===
11 July
Wind: +0.1 m/s

Rank	Lane	Name	Nationality	Time	Notes
1st place, gold medalist(s)	8	Yi Bo-an	Chinese Taipei	13.28	
2nd place, silver medalist(s)	9	Ami Takahashi	Japan	13.31	
3rd place, bronze medalist(s)	7	Wu Anqi	China	13.34	
4	6	Shreeya Rajesh	India	13.49	
5	5	Yuka Fukui	Japan	13.68	
6	4	Sabita Toppo	India	13.73	
7	3	Chung Chao-chen	Chinese Taipei	13.82	
8	10	Wang Ziqi	China	13.83	
9	2	Chloe Pak Hoi Man	Hong Kong	13.95	

=== 400 metres hurdles ===
11 July

Rank	Lane	Name	Nationality	Time	Notes
1st place, gold medalist(s)	6	Chung Hsin-ju	Chinese Taipei	57.41	
2nd place, silver medalist(s)	4	Nurkhon Ochilova	Uzbekistan	57.99	
3rd place, bronze medalist(s)	7	Shravani Sachin	India	58.09	
4	8	Haru Hiraki	Japan	58.19	
5	1	Ekaterina Koloda	Kazakhstan	59.98	
6	3	Anastassiya Tsvirkunova	Kazakhstan	1:00.16	
7	9	Lê Thị Tuyết Mai	Vietnam	1:00.31	
8	2	Ling Yifan	China	1:02.97	
9	5	Arisa Ogasawara	Japan	1:03.77	

=== 3000 metres steeplechase ===
9 July

Rank	Name	Nationality	Time	Notes
1st place, gold medalist(s)	Yang Yiting	China	10:14.68	
2nd place, silver medalist(s)	Liu Yuxin	China	10:25.51	
3rd place, bronze medalist(s)	Prachi Devkar	India	10:32.69	
4	Ayana Yamashita	Japan	10:38.57	
5	Dilshoda Usmanova	Uzbekistan	10:57.74	
6	Akbilek Kuralbai	Kazakhstan	11:11.60	
7	Edna Magtubo	Philippines	11:30.94	
8	Hoàng Thị Ngọc Ánh	Vietnam	11:36.40	

=== 4 × 100 metres relay ===
12 July

Rank	Lane	Nation	Competitors	Time	Notes
1st place, gold medalist(s)	7	China	Liu Xiajun, Li Huixian, Jian Rujing, Xue Kunzhi	43.75	
2nd place, silver medalist(s)	5	India	Sanjana, Akshaya Saravanan, Sudheeksha Vadluri, Shreeya Rajesh	44.68	
3rd place, bronze medalist(s)	6	Kazakhstan	Anna Shumilo, Yekaterina Puzyreva, Tatyana No, Darya Gridassova	50.90	

=== 4 × 400 metres relay ===
12 July

Rank	Lane	Nation	Competitors	Time	Notes
1st place, gold medalist(s)	5	India	Shravani Sachin Sangle, Sandramol Sabu, Pravalika Narimalla, Nofisa Khatun	3:33.62	
2nd place, silver medalist(s)	8	China	Li Xueqi, Dong Xinyi, Wang Shiyu, Jiang Yutong	3:35.14	
3rd place, bronze medalist(s)	7	Kazakhstan	Anna Shumilo, Anastasiya Tsvirkunova, Ekaterina Koloda, Mariya Shuvalova	3:37.65	
4	6	Mongolia	Otgon-erdene Dashchirev, Munguntuul Undrakh, Munkhkherlen Tsoodol, Khongorzul Enkhmaa	4:08.00	

=== Half marathon walk ===
12 July

Rank	Name	Nationality	Time	Notes
1st place, gold medalist(s)	Ning Jinlin	China	1:38:24	
2nd place, silver medalist(s)	Cuo Doumao	China	1:39:01	
3rd place, bronze medalist(s)	Yasmina Tokonbayeva	Kazakhstan	1:41:26	
4	Aarti	India	1:45:40	
5	Elmira Kalimullina	Kazakhstan	1:50:38	

=== High jump ===
10 July

Rank	Name	Nationality	1.60	1.65	1.70	1.75	1.79	1.83	1.85	1.88	Result	Notes
1st place, gold medalist(s)	Valeriya Gorbatova	Uzbekistan	–	–	o	o	o	o	xo	xxx	1.85	
2nd place, silver medalist(s)	Barmo Sayfullayeva	Uzbekistan	–	–	–	o	o	o	xxx		1.83	
3rd place, bronze medalist(s)	Jin Ruoxuan	China	–	–	o	o	xo	o	xxx		1.83	
4	Liu Lu	China	–	o	o	xo	xxx				1.75	
5	Dương Thị Thao	Vietnam	–	–	o	xxo	xxx				1.75	
6	Mariel Abuan	Philippines	–	xxo	o	xxo	xxx				1.75	
7	Faina Meirmanova	Kazakhstan	–	o	xo	xxx					1.70	
8	Jade Chew	Singapore	o	xo	xxx						1.65	

=== Pole vault ===
9 July

Rank	Name	Nationality	3.80	3.90	4.00	4.10	4.20	4.45	Result	Notes
1st place, gold medalist(s)	Wei Lingxia	China	–	–	o	xo	xxo	xxx	4.20	
2nd place, silver medalist(s)	Sora Murata	Japan	xo	–	o	xxo	xxx		4.10	
3rd place, bronze medalist(s)	Mitsuki Kobayashi	Japan	o	o	o	xxx			4.00	
4	Nitika Akare	India	o	o	xxx				3.90	

=== Long jump ===
10 July

Rank	Name	Nationality	#1	#2	#3	#4	#5	#6	Result	Notes
1st place, gold medalist(s)	Huang Yingying	China	'6.48	6.41	–	–	–	–	6.48	
2nd place, silver medalist(s)	Anastasiya Rypakova	Kazakhstan	4.46	5.85	6.02	6.11	6.08	6.02	6.11	
3rd place, bronze medalist(s)	Hà Thị Thúy Hằng	Vietnam	45.71	x	5.92	6.04	6.10	6.09	6.10	
4	Liao Lianying	China	x	5.68	5.85	6.06	6.07	5.78	6.07	
5	Madushani Herath	Sri Lanka	x	x	6.02	5.78	6.03	5.99	6.03	
6	Khushnoza Shavkatova	Uzbekistan	x	x	5.71	5.79	5.68	x	5.79	
7	Suvd-Erdene Bat-Erdene	Mongolia	x	x	4.86	5.02	x	5.06	5.06	
	Dilyara Khaibullina	Kazakhstan							DNS	

=== Triple jump ===
12 July

Rank	Name	Nationality	#1	#2	#3	#4	#5	#6	Result	Notes
1st place, gold medalist(s)	Sharifa Davronova	Uzbekistan	13.96	x	14.24	14.07	x	14.02	14.24	
2nd place, silver medalist(s)	Zhou Hui	China	x	x	13.56	x	–	x	13.56	
3rd place, bronze medalist(s)	Madushani Herath	Sri Lanka	12.43	13.25	x	12.98	x	x	13.25	
4	Khushnoza Shavkatova	Uzbekistan	x	x	12.79	x	x	12.52	12.79	
5	Huang Yingying	China	x	11.64	12.66	x	–	–	12.66	

=== Shot put ===
10 July

Rank	Name	Nationality	#1	#2	#3	#4	#5	#6	Result	Notes
1st place, gold medalist(s)	Ding Zhuhui	China	16.77	17.07	16.87	x	16.56	17.15	17.15	
2nd place, silver medalist(s)	Chiang Ching-yuan	Chinese Taipei	15.85	16.82	16.18	15.82	x	15.96	16.82	
3rd place, bronze medalist(s)	Tian Xinyi	China	14.69	14.76	14.71	14.99	14.55	14.95	14.99	
4	Anupriya Valliyot	India	13.77	14.32	x	14.04	14.97	14.47	14.97	
5	Park So-jin	South Korea	13.32	13.36	x	x	13.50	x	13.50	

=== Discus throw ===
11 July

Rank	Name	Nationality	#1	#2	#3	#4	#5	#6	Result	Notes
1st place, gold medalist(s)	Jiang Zhichao	China	52.86	58.63	55.12	56.57	57.43	55.87	58.63	
2nd place, silver medalist(s)	Huang Jingru	China	54.92	x	x	x	x	55.33	55.33	
3rd place, bronze medalist(s)	Priya	India	48.30	x	50.44	47.57	47.47	x	50.44	
4	Yong Su-jin	South Korea	45.33	45.26	47.11	x	45.87	46.47	47.11	

=== Hammer throw ===
9 July

Rank	Name	Nationality	#1	#2	#3	#4	#5	#6	Result	Notes
1st place, gold medalist(s)	Wang Ziyi	China	66.12	64.69	71.04	64.73	64.48	x	71.04	
2nd place, silver medalist(s)	Fang Ling	China	69.23	68.78	69.80	69.51	70.88	69.78	70.88	
3rd place, bronze medalist(s)	Raika Murakami	Japan	64.53	67.09	68.69	68.83	x	x	68.83	
4	Kim Tae-hee	South Korea	51.91	54.72	53.40	55.55	x	58.83	58.83	
	Souphaphone Konenyvong	Laos	x	x	x	x	x	x	NM	

=== Javelin throw ===
10 July

Rank	Name	Nationality	#1	#2	#3	#4	#5	#6	Result	Notes
1st place, gold medalist(s)	Chu Pin-hsun	Chinese Taipei	55.12	54.62	56.87	57.01	–	57.31	57.31	
2nd place, silver medalist(s)	Zhang Xidan	China	x	48.03	47.35	49.73	x	54.59	54.59	
3rd place, bronze medalist(s)	Aoi Murakami	Japan	49.93	52.74	54.40	52.83	x	53.13	54.40	
4	Li Hanyue	China	53.58	49.83	49.54	x	50.57	52.65	53.58	
5	Yang Seo-kyu	South Korea	x	52.31	50.35	49.91	52.85	x	53.58	
6	Sayuka Kurata	Japan	x	x	43.24	50.15	50.12	52.44	52.44	
7	Ng Jing Xuan	Malaysia	44.31	45.46	x	43.65	x	x	45.46	

=== Heptathlon ===
10–11 July

The highest mark recorded in each event is highlighted in yellow

Rank	Name	Nationality	100m H	HJ	SP	200m	LJ	JT	800m	Points	Notes
1st place, gold medalist(s)	Hu Xingyu	China	14.01	1.66	13.55	26.08	6.11	44.62	2:19.85	4976	
2nd place, silver medalist(s)	Alina Chistyakova	Kazakhstan	14.05	1.72	11.62	25.09	6.15	38.73	2:19.27	4904	
3rd place, bronze medalist(s)	Ugiloi Norbaeva	Uzbekistan	14.12	1.72	12.14	26.05	5.56	45.71	2:23.63	4797	
4	Huang Wenting	China	13.79	1.66	10.22	24.38	6.08	27.55	2:18.11	4607	

== Mixed results ==
=== 4 × 400 metres relay ===
9 July

Rank	Lane	Nation	Competitors	Time	Notes
1st place, gold medalist(s)	7	India	Astik Pradhan, Sandramol Sabu, Setu Mishra, Shravani Sachin Sangle	3:18.64	
2nd place, silver medalist(s)	5	China	Li Yifan, Jiang Yutong, Ye Hongxiang, Huang Yingying	3:18.74	
3rd place, bronze medalist(s)	6	Philippines	Jazzpeer Arcenal, Lea Kriszeda Ordinario, Hussein Loraña, Naomi Johnson	3:25.28	
