= 2022 World Athletics U20 Championships – Women's 400 metres =

Women's 400 metres at the 2022 World Athletics U20 Championships
- Venue: Estadio Olímpico Pascual Guerrero
- Dates: 2 August (heats); 3 August (semifinals); 4 August (final)
- Competitors: 34 from 28 nations
- Winning time: 51.50

Medalists
gold medal	Yemi Mary John	Great Britain
silver medal	Damaris Mutunga	Kenya
bronze medal	Rupal	India

The women's 400 metres at the 2022 World Athletics U20 Championships was held at the Estadio Olímpico Pascual Guerrero in Cali, Colombia on 2, 3 and 4 August 2022.

== Records ==
U20 standing records prior to the 2022 World Athletics U20 Championships were as follows:

Standing records prior to the 2022 World Athletics U20 Championships
World U20 Record	Grit Breuer (GER)	49.42	Tokyo, Japan	27 August 1991
Championship Record	Ashley Spencer (USA)	50.50	Barcelona, Spain	13 July 2012
World U20 Leading	Imaobong Nse Uko (NGR)	51.24	Lubbock, United States	15 May 2022

== Results ==
=== Round 1 ===
Qualification: First 4 of each heat (Q) and the 4 fastest times (q) qualified for the semifinals.

Rank	Heat	Lane	Name	Nationality	Time	Note
1	3	3	Yemi Mary John	Great Britain	52.42	Q, PB
2	2	6	Rupal	India	52.50 [.496]	Q
2	5	4	Berta Segura	Spain	52.50 [.496]	Q, NU20R
4	5	7	Priya Mohan	India	52.56	Q
5	2	7	Damaris Mutunga	Kenya	52.60	Q, PB
6	1	3	Zenab Mahamat	Bahrain	52.87	Q, PB
7	3	2	Ellie Beer	Australia	53.30	Q, SB
8	1	8	Precious Molepo	South Africa	53.50	Q
9	5	8	Henriette Jæger	Norway	53.53	Q
10	3	6	Mekenze Kelley	United States	53.59	Q
11	1	5	Ella Clayton	Canada	53.69	Q
12	4	7	Dejanea Oakley	Jamaica	53.70	Q
13	4	6	Sylvia Chelangat	Kenya	53.99	Q
14	5	5	Jasmin Guthrie	Australia	54.02	Q
15	1	6	Mia Powell	New Zealand	54.04	Q, PB
16	3	5	Tharushi Dissanayaka	Sri Lanka	54.13	Q
17	2	3	Salma Lehlali	Morocco	54.14	Q, NU20R
18	2	2	Katriina Wright	Finland	54.16	Q
19	4	2	Queen Usunobun	Nigeria	54.32	Q
20	4	5	Ana Rus	Slovenia	54.43	Q, PB
21	5	3	Rickianna Russell	Jamaica	54.63	q
22	5	6	Ioana-Rebecca Andrei	Romania	54.75	q, PB
23	4	8	Zaya Akins	United States	55.23	q
24	3	7	Javonya Valcourt	Bahamas	55.31	q
25	4	4	Alianni Rosario Arrindel	Dominican Republic	55.57	
26	5	2	Jamara Patterson	Grenada	55.75	
27	1	7	Akrisa Eristee	British Virgin Islands	55.86	
28	1	4	Julia Aparecida Rocha	Brazil	55.92	
29	3	4	Nicole Milić	Croatia	56.26	
30	4	3	Ibeyis Romero	Venezuela	56.55	
31	2	4	Nancy Demattè	Italy	56.70	
32	2	5	Paola Loboa	Colombia	57.33	
33	3	8	Natasha Fox	Trinidad and Tobago	58.09	
	2	8	Osaretin Joy Usenbor	Nigeria	DQ	TR17.4.3

=== Semifinals ===
Qualification: First 2 of each heat (Q) and the 2 fastest times (q) qualified for the final.

Rank	Heat	Lane	Name	Nationality	Time	Note
1	1	4	Yemi Mary John	Great Britain	51.72	Q, PB
2	2	5	Rupal	India	52.27	Q, PB
3	1	6	Damaris Mutunga	Kenya	52.29 [.284]	Q, PB
4	2	6	Dejanea Oakley	Jamaica	52.29 [.289]	Q, NU20R
5	2	4	Henriette Jæger	Norway	52.33	q
6	3	6	Berta Segura	Spain	52.51	Q
7	2	3	Ellie Beer	Australia	52.55	q, SB
8	1	7	Ella Clayton	Canada	52.84	
9	1	3	Mekenze Kelley	United States	53.09	
10	1	5	Priya Mohan	India	53.22	
11	3	3	Precious Molepo	South Africa	53.28	Q
12	3	7	Jasmin Guthrie	Australia	53.56	PB
13	2	2	Zaya Akins	United States	53.62	
14	3	8	Queen Usunobun	Nigeria	53.63	
15	3	5	Sylvia Chelangat	Kenya	53.89	
16	1	2	Katriina Wright	Finland	53.95	
17	2	7	Mia Powell	New Zealand	54.37	
18	3	2	Rickianna Russell	Jamaica	54.44	
19	2	1	Ana Rus	Slovenia	54.53	
20	3	1	Ioana-Rebecca Andrei	Romania	54.78	
21	1	8	Tharushi Dissanayaka	Sri Lanka	54.86	
22	1	1	Javonya Valcourt	Bahamas	54.89	PB
	3	4	Zenab Mahamat	Bahrain	DQ	TR17.4.3
	2	8	Salma Lehlali	Morocco	DQ	TR17.4.3

=== Final ===
The final was held on 4 August at 17:42

Rank	Lane	Name	Nationality	Time	Note
1st place, gold medalist(s)	4	Yemi Mary John	Great Britain	51.50	PB
2nd place, silver medalist(s)	5	Damaris Mutunga	Kenya	51.71	NU20R
3rd place, bronze medalist(s)	6	Rupal	India	51.85	PB
4	1	Henriette Jæger	Norway	52.23	NU20R
5	8	Dejanea Oakley	Jamaica	52.31	
6	3	Berta Segura	Spain	52.56	
7	2	Ellie Beer	Australia	52.82	
8	7	Precious Molepo	South Africa	53.49	
