= Athletics at the 2026 Asian Games – Women's long jump =

Women's long jump at the 2026 Asian Games
- Venue: Mizuho Park Athletic Stadium, Nagoya
- Date: 27 September 2026
- Competitors: 16 from 11 nations

Medalists
gold medal	Huang Yingying	China
silver medal	Ancy Sojan	India
bronze medal	Tan Mengyi	China

The women's long jump competition at the 2026 Asian Games took place on 27 September 2026 at the Mizuho Park Athletic Stadium in Nagoya, Japan. Huang Yingying and Tan Mengyi of China won the gold and bronze medal respectively, while Ancy Sojan of India won the silver medal.

== Schedule ==
All times are Japan Standard Time (UTC+09:00)

Schedule
Date	Time	Event
Sunday, 27 September	18:55	Final

== Records ==
Prior to this competition, the existing world, Asian and Games records were as follows.

World Record	Galina Chistyakova (URS)	7.52	Leningrad, Soviet Union	11 June 1988
Asian Record	Yao Weili (CHN)	7.01	Jinan, China	4 June 1993
Games Record	Yao Weili (CHN)	6.91	Hiroshima, Japan	15 October 1994

== Results ==
Rank	Athlete	Attempt						Result	Notes
Rank	Athlete	1	2	3	4	5	6	Result	Notes
1st place, gold medalist(s)	Huang Yingying (CHN)	6.14	6.44	x	6.40	6.49	6.55	6.55	
2nd place, silver medalist(s)	Ancy Sojan (IND)	6.49	x	6.46	6.31	6.53	6.49	6.53	
3rd place, bronze medalist(s)	Tan Mengyi (CHN)	x	6.38	6.07	6.40	6.40	6.46	6.46	
4	Shaili Singh (IND)	6.25	6.34	6.34	6.41	6.42	6.33	6.42	
5	Sumire Hata (JPN)	6.30	6.31	6.09	6.32	x	6.39	6.39	
6	Sharifa Davronova (UZB)	6.05	x	5.88	x	6.21	x	6.21	
7	Tran Thi Loan (VIE)	6.18	6.08	6.01	6.12	6.15	6.15	6.18	
8	Reihaneh Mobini (IRI)	6.16	6.16	6.12	6.13	x	6.01	6.16	
9	Yue Nga Yan (HKG)	x	x	6.05				6.05	SB
10	Ayaka Kora (JPN)	x	5.71	5.96				5.96	
11	Ha Thi Thuy Hang (VIE)	5.95	x	5.91				5.95	
12	Nethmika Herath (SRI)	5.87	5.88	5.91				5.91	
13	Anastassiya Rypakova (KAZ)	5.80	5.77	5.65				5.80	
14	Jia Wai Yin (HKG)	x	5.79	5.77				5.79	
15	Most Khatun (BAN)	5.50	5.69	5.66				5.69	PB
16	Enkhbat Oyundari (MGL)	x	5.56	5.29				5.56	
