= Amit Khatri =

Indian racewalker

Amit
Personal information
- Nationality: Indian
- Born: 25 December 2003 (age 22)

Sport
- Sport: Racewalking
Medal record
Men's athletics
Representing India
World U20 Championships
Silver medal – second place	2021 Nairobi	10,000 m walk

Amit Khatri, known mononymously as Amit, is an Indian racewalker who competes in the 10,000 m walk. He won the silver medal at the 2021 World Athletics U20 Championships held in Nairobi, Kenya.

== See also ==
- Heristone Wanyonyi
- Shaili Singh
