= Athletics at the 2022 Asian Games – Women's long jump =

Women's long jump at the 2022 Asian Games
- Venue: Hangzhou Olympic Expo Main Stadium
- Date: 2 October 2023
- Competitors: 15 from 13 nations

Medalists
gold medal	Xiong Shiqi	China
silver medal	Ancy Sojan	India
bronze medal	Yue Nga Yan	Hong Kong

The women's long jump competition at the 2022 Asian Games took place on 2 October 2023 at the HOC Stadium, Hangzhou.

== Schedule ==
All times are China Standard Time (UTC+08:00)

Date	Time	Event
Monday, 2 October 2023	19:10	Final

== Records ==
Prior to this competition, the existing world, Asian and Games records were as follows.

World Record	Galina Chistyakova (URS)	7.52	Leningrad, Soviet Union	11 June 1988
Asian Record	Yao Weili (CHN)	7.01	Jinan, China	5 June 1993
Games Record	Yao Weili (CHN)	6.91	Hiroshima, Japan	15 October 1994

== Results ==
Legend

- NM — No mark

Rank	Athlete	Attempt						Result	Notes
Rank	Athlete	1	2	3	4	5	6	Result	Notes
1st place, gold medalist(s)	Xiong Shiqi (CHN)	6.62 +0.4	6.60 −0.1	6.73; 0.0	6.62; 0.0	6.62 +0.4	6.33 +0.6	6.73	
2nd place, silver medalist(s)	Ancy Sojan (IND)	6.13; 0.0	6.49 +0.3	6.56; 0.0	6.30 +0.2	6.63 +0.3	X	6.63	
3rd place, bronze medalist(s)	Yue Nga Yan (HKG)	6.21 +0.2	6.50 +0.1	6.27 +0.2	X	X	6.37 −0.4	6.50	
4	Sumire Hata (JPN)	X	6.35 +0.1	6.42 +0.3	6.48 +0.4	6.48 +0.1	X	6.48	
5	Shaili Singh (IND)	6.38 +0.2	6.34 +0.7	6.15 +0.1	6.31 +0.6	6.48 −0.4	6.23 −0.1	6.48	
6	Sarangi Silva (SRI)	5.51 −0.1	5.94 +0.6	6.14 +0.2	5.87 −0.3	5.92 −0.3	5.57 +0.1	6.14	
7	Sharifa Davronova (UZB)	6.14; 0.0	4.39; 0.0	X	5.89 −0.4	—	—	6.14	
8	Bùi Thị Thu Thảo (VIE)	X	X	6.09 +0.5	X	4.82; 0.0	X	6.09	
9	Lee Hui-jin (KOR)	6.06 +0.8	X	X				6.06	
10	Maria Natalia Londa (INA)	5.98 +0.2	X	X				5.98	
11	Lin Tzu-chi (TPE)	X	5.77 +0.2	X				5.77	
12	Fatima Mubarak (BRN)	5.07 +0.1	X	5.61; 0.0				5.61	
13	Enkhbatyn Oyuundari (MGL)	X	5.13 −0.1	5.06 +0.2				5.13	
—	Chan Ka Sin (HKG)	X	X	X				NM	
—	Sou I Man (MAC)	X	X	X				NM	
