= 2025 Asian Athletics Championships – Women's 4 × 400 metres relay =

Women's 4 × 400 metres relay at the 2025 Asian Athletics Championships
- Venue: Gumi Civic Stadium
- Location: Gumi, South Korea
- Dates: 29 May
- Competitors: 28 from 7 nations
- Winning time: 3:34.18

Medalists
gold medal	Jisna Mathew; Rupal Chaudhary; Rajitha Kunja; Subha Venkatesan	India
silver medal	Thi Ngoc Nguyen; Nguyen Thi Hang; Quách Thị Lan; Hoang Thi Minh Hanh	Vietnam
bronze medal	Nadeesha Ramanayake; Lakshima Mendis; Jayeshi Uththara; Harshani Fernando	Sri Lanka

The women's 4 × 400 metres relay event at the 2025 Asian Athletics Championships was held on 29 May.

== Schedule ==
The event schedule, in local time (UTC+9), was as follows:

Date	Time	Round
29 May	22:45	Final

== Results ==
Place	Nation	Athletes	Time	Notes
1st place, gold medalist(s)	India	Jisna Mathew; Rupal Chaudhary; Kunja Rajitha; Subha Venkatesan	3:34.18	SB
2nd place, silver medalist(s)	Vietnam	Nguyễn Thị Ngọc; Nguyễn Thị Hằng; Quách Thị Lan; Minh Hạnh Hoàng Thị	3:34.77	
3rd place, bronze medalist(s)	Sri Lanka	Nadeesha Ramanayake; Lakshima Mendis; Jayeshi Uththara; Harshani Fernando	3:36.67	
4	Kazakhstan	Kristina Korjagina; Anna Schumilo; Viktoriya Zyabkina; Alexandra Zalyubovskaya	3:40.71	
5	Uzbekistan	Laylo Allaberganova; Nurxon Ochilova; Jonbibi Hukmova; Irina Levina	3:40.91	
6	South Korea	Ha Je-yeong; Kim Ju-ha; Lee Hae-in; Kim Seo-yoon	3:42.61	
7	Hong Kong	Tang Pui Kwan; Season Choi; Poon Hang Wai; Jane Christa Ming Suet Karlsson	3:47.80	
