= 2022 World Athletics U20 Championships – Mixed 4 × 400 metres relay =

Mixed 4 × 400 metres relay at the 2022 World Athletics U20 Championships
- Venue: Estadio Olímpico Pascual Guerrero
- Dates: 1 August (heats); 2 August (final)
- Competitors: 71 from 16 nations
- Winning time: 3:17.69

Medalists
gold medal	Charlie Bartholomew; Madison Whyte; Will Sumner; Kennedy Wade; Kaylyn Brown*	United States
silver medal	Barath Sridhar; Priya Mohan; Kapil; Rupal	India
bronze medal	Jasauna Dennis; Abigail Campbell; Malachi Johnson; Alliah Baker	Jamaica

The mixed 4 × 400 metres relay at the 2022 World Athletics U20 Championships was held at the Estadio Olímpico Pascual Guerrero in Cali, Colombia on 1 and 2 August 2022.

== Records ==
Standing records prior to the 2022 World Athletics U20 Championships
Championship Record	Nigeria	3:19.70	Nairobi, Kenya	18 August 2021
World U20 Leading	Slovenia	3:25.69	Trieste, Italy	24 July 2022

== Results ==
=== Heats ===
Qualification: First 2 of each heat ( Q ) plus the 2 fastest times ( q ) qualified for the final.

Rank	Heat	Nation	Athletes	Time	Notes
1	2	United States	Charlie Bartholomew, Madison Whyte, Will Sumner, Kaylyn Brown	3:18.65	Q, CR
2	3	India	Barath Sridhar, Priya Mohan, Kapil, Rupal	3:19.62	Q, AU20R
3	2	Jamaica	Jasauna Dennis, Abigail Campbell, Malachi Johnson, Alliah Baker	3:19.74	Q, PB
4	3	Germany	Florian Kroll, Lysann Helms, Okai Charles, Tessa Srumf	3:22.41	Q, NU20R
5	3	Great Britain	Brodie Young, Etty Sisson, Cameron McGregor, Poppy Malik	3:22.77	q, PB
6	3	Poland	Remigiusz Zazula, Kornelia Lesiewicz, Jakub Szczepaniak, Martyna Trocholepsza	3:23.71	q, SB
7	2	Brazil	Vinicius Moura, Julia Aparecida Rocha, Matheus Lima, Amanda Miranda Da Silva	3:24.31	SB
8	2	Mexico	Cristian Valdez, Paola Mireles, Geronimo Paez, Shakti Alvarez	3:27.02	NU20R
9	2	Australia	Gus Simpfendorfer, Annie Pfeiffer, Brodie Hicks, Txai Anglin	3:27.08	SB
10	3	Romania	Denis Gabriel Neacsu, Ștefania Zediu, Sorin Alexandru Voinea, Ioana-Rebecca Andrei	3:27.18	PB
11	3	South Africa	Divan Vlok, Colleen Scheepers, Mthi Mthimkhulu, Simone De Wet	3:27.48	SB
12	1	Botswana	Unametsi Nyathi, Obakeng Kamberuka, Gaolebale Prince Soulo, Naledi Monthe	3:29.28	Q, PB
13	1	Czech Republic	Milan Ščibráni, Veronika Šímová, Ondřej Veselý, Anna Cagašová	3:29.45	Q, SB
14	1	Ecuador	Ian Andrey Pata, Xiomara Ibarra, Freddy Vásquez, Evelin Mercado	3:29.65	NU20R
	2	Bahrain	Omar Ebrahim, Zenab Mahamat, Abdallah Djimet, Awtif Imoleayo Ahmed	DQ	TR24.19
	1	Italy	Tommaso Boninti, Zoe Tessarolo, Marco Zunino, Ngalula Kabangu	DQ	TR17.4
	1	Bahamas		DNS	
	2	Kenya		DNS	
	1	Nigeria		DNS	

=== Final ===
The final was held on 2 August at 16:59.

Rank	Nation	Athletes	Time	Notes
1st place, gold medalist(s)	United States	Charlie Bartholomew, Madison Whyte, Will Sumner, Kennedy Wade	3:17.69	CR
2nd place, silver medalist(s)	India	Barath Sridhar, Priya Mohan, Kapil, Rupal	3:17.76	AU20R
3rd place, bronze medalist(s)	Jamaica	Jasauna Dennis, Abigail Campbell, Malachi Johnson, Alliah Baker	3:19.98	
4	Great Britain	Brodie Young, Poppy Malik, Samuel Reardon, Etty Sisson	3:21.03	PB
5	Poland	Remigiusz Zazula, Aleksandra Wołczak, Jakub Szczepaniak, Martyna Trocholepsza	3:22.52	SB
6	Germany	Florian Kroll, Lena Leege, Lasse Schmitt, Tessa Srumf	3:24.34	
7	Botswana	Thabang Charles Monngathipa, Winnie Sarefo, Unametsi Nyathi, Obakeng Kamberuka	3:24.76	PB
8	Czech Republic	Milan Ščibráni, Anna Cagašová, Ondřej Veselý, Veronika Šímová	3:29.18	SB
