= 2025 Asian Athletics Championships – Women's long jump =

Women's long jump at the 2025 Asian Athletics Championships
- Venue: Gumi Civic Stadium
- Location: Gumi, South Korea
- Dates: 28 May (qualification); 29 May (final)
- Competitors: 21 from 12 nations
- Winning distance: 6.40 m

Medalists
gold medal	Reihaneh Mobini	Iran
silver medal	Ancy Sojan	India
bronze medal	Shaili Singh	India

The women's long jump event at the 2025 Asian Athletics Championships was held on 28 and 29 May.

== Records ==
Records before the 2025 Asian Athletics Championships
Record	Athlete (nation)	Distance (m)	Location	Date
World record	Galina Chistyakova (URS)	7.52	Leningrad, Soviet Union	11 June 1988
Asian record	Yao Weili (CHN)	7.01	Jinan, China	4 June 1993
Championship record	Sumire Hata (JPN)	6.97	Bangkok, Thailand	14 July 2023
World leading	Malaika Mihambo (GER)	7.05	Karlsruhe, Germany	7 February 2025
Asian leading	Li Zhishuang (CHN)	6.55	Zhaoqing, China	11 April 2025

== Schedule ==
The event schedule, in local time (UTC+9), was as follows:

Date	Time	Round
28 May	10:05	Qualification
29 May	21:45	Final

== Results ==
=== Qualification ===
Held on 28 May.

==== Group A ====
Place	Athlete	Nation	#1	#2	#3	Result	Notes
1	Reihaneh Mobini	Iran	6.10 (+0.0 m/s)	6.33 (−0.1 m/s)		6.33 m (−0.1 m/s)	Q
2	Guo Sijia	China	6.01 (+0.1 m/s)	x	6.17 (+0.1 m/s)	6.17 m (+0.1 m/s)	q
3	Anastassija Rypakova	Kazakhstan	5.44 (−1.3 m/s)	6.15 (+0.4 m/s)	x	6.15 m (+0.4 m/s)	q, SB
4	Ancy Sojan	India	6.07 (+0.1 m/s)	6.14 m (±0.0 m/s)	5.99 (±0.0 m/s)	6.14 m (±0.0 m/s)	q
5	Maya Takeuchi	Japan	6.05 (−0.4 m/s)	x	5.99 (−0.5 m/s)	6.05 m (−0.4 m/s)	q
6	Lee Hui-jin	South Korea	5.91 (−1.2 m/s)	x	6.04 (±0.0 m/s)	6.04 m (±0.0 m/s)	q
7	Vũ Thị Ngọc Hà	Vietnam	5.97 (+0.4 m/s)	5.97 (±0.0 m/s)	5.99 (−1.1 m/s)	5.99 m (−1.1 m/s)	
8	Awutet Amja Vinsensia	Indonesia	5.57 (−0.1 m/s)	x	5.64 (−1.6 m/s)	5.64 m (−1.6 m/s)	
9	Jia Wai Yin	Hong Kong	5.60 (−0.2 m/s)	x	5.45 (−0.7 m/s)	5.60 m (−0.2 m/s)	
10	Sharifa Davronova	Uzbekistan	x	5.26 (−0.8 m/s)	x	5.26 m (−0.8 m/s)	
11	Rabab Qubbaj	Jordan	4.62 (−0.1 m/s)	4.53 (−0.5 m/s)	4.59 (±0.0 m/s)	4.62 m (−0.1 m/s)	

==== Group B ====
Place	Athlete	Nation	#1	#2	#3	Result	Notes
1	Sumire Hata	Japan	6.35 (+0.6 m/s)			6.35 m (+0.6 m/s)	Q
2	Shaili Singh	India	6.12 (+0.8 m/s)	6.17 (+0.3 m/s)	6.13 (+0.4 m/s)	6.17 m (+0.3 m/s)	q
3	Yue Ya Xin	Hong Kong	6.04 (±0.0 m/s)	6.17 (−0.2 m/s)	5.99 (−1.9 m/s)	6.17 m (−0.2 m/s)	q
4	Yu Jeong-mi	South Korea	x	5.92 (±0.0 m/s)	6.10 (−0.3 m/s)	6.10 m (−0.3 m/s)	q, SB
5	Zhu Yi	China	6.07 (+0.2 m/s)	5.88 (−0.9 m/s)	5.93 (−0.6 m/s)	6.07 m (+0.2 m/s)	q
6	Thị Loan Trần	Vietnam	5.88 (+0.7 m/s)	6.03 (−0.2 m/s)	6.05 (−1.3 m/s)	6.05 m (−1.3 m/s)	q
7	Alina Chistyakova	Kazakhstan	5.91 (+1.3 m/s)	5.91 (−1.0 m/s)	5.92 (−1.1 m/s)	5.92 m (−1.1 m/s)	
8	Oh So-hee	South Korea	5.62 (±0.0 m/s)	5.74 (+0.7 m/s)	5.79 (+0.4 m/s)	5.79 m (+0.4 m/s)	
9	Aisha Al-Kheder	Kuwait	5.19 (±0.0 m/s)	5.40 (+0.2 m/s)	x	5.40 m (+0.2 m/s)	
—	Roksana Khudoyarova	Uzbekistan				DNS	

=== Final ===
Place	Athlete	Nation	#1	#2	#3	#4	#5	#6	Result	Notes
1st place, gold medalist(s)	Reihaneh Mobini	Iran	6.36 (+0.5 m/s)	6.40 (+0.5 m/s)	x	6.13 (+0.1 m/s)	6.33 (+0.1 m/s)	6.09 (+0.4 m/s)	6.40 m (+0.5 m/s)	
2nd place, silver medalist(s)	Ancy Sojan	India	6.29 (+1.2 m/s)	6.25 (+0.2 m/s)	6.33 (+0.5 m/s)	6.17 (−0.3 m/s)	6.16 (+0.2 m/s)	x	6.33 m (+0.5 m/s)	
3rd place, bronze medalist(s)	Shaili Singh	India	6.30 (+0.9 m/s)	6.20 (+0.3 m/s)	6.29 (+1.1 m/s)	6.17 (−0.2 m/s)	6.09 (+0.2 m/s)	5.99 (+0.5 m/s)	6.30 m (+0.9 m/s)	
4	Sumire Hata	Japan	x	6.12 (+0.7 m/s)	6.20 (+0.9 m/s)	6.13 (−0.5 m/s)	5.95 (+0.3 m/s)	6.13 (+0.3 m/s)	6.20 m (+0.9 m/s)	
5	Yue Ya Xin	Hong Kong	6.19 (+0.9 m/s)	6.16 (+0.3 m/s)	6.19 (+1.1 m/s)	x	x	x	6.19 m (+0.9 m/s)	
6	Yu Jeong-mi	South Korea	6.12 (+1.2 m/s)	x	5.73 (±0.0 m/s)	4.07 (−0.1 m/s)	5.83 (+0.4 m/s)	x	6.12 m (+1.2 m/s)	SB
7	Guo Sijia	China	6.10 (+0.6 m/s)	x	5.45 (+0.6 m/s)	x	x	5.82 (+0.3 m/s)	6.10 m (+0.6 m/s)	
8	Maya Takeuchi	Japan	6.05 (+0.2 m/s)	x	5.97 (+0.7 m/s)	5.88 (+0.2 m/s)	x	5.81 (+0.2 m/s)	6.05 m (+0.2 m/s)	
9	Lee Hui-jin	South Korea	x	5.97 (+0.7 m/s)	5.93 (+0.3 m/s)				5.97 m (+0.7 m/s)	
10	Thị Loan Trần	Vietnam	5.57 (+0.7 m/s)	5.90 (+0.5 m/s)	5.93 (+0.5 m/s)				5.93 m (+0.5 m/s)	
11	Zhu Yi	China	5.82 (+0.7 m/s)	5.93 (+1.0 m/s)	5.46 (+0.5 m/s)				5.93 m (+1.0 m/s)	
12	Anastassiya Rypakova	Kazakhstan	5.76 (+0.8 m/s)	5.89 m (+0.9 m/s)	5.59 (+0.7 m/s)				5.89 m (+0.9 m/s)	
