= 2025 Asian Athletics Championships – Women's 400 metres =

Women's 400 metres at the 2025 Asian Athletics Championships
- Venue: Gumi Civic Stadium
- Location: Gumi, South Korea
- Dates: 27 May (heats); 28 May (final)
- Competitors: 22 from 17 nations
- Winning time: 52.17

Medalists
gold medal	Nanako Matsumoto	Japan
silver medal	Rupal Chaudhary	India
bronze medal	Jonbibi Hukmova	Uzbekistan

The women's 400 metres event at the 2025 Asian Athletics Championships was held on 27 and 28 May.

== Records ==
Records before the 2025 Asian Athletics Championships
Record	Athlete (nation)	Time (s)	Location	Date
World record	Marita Koch (GDR)	47.60	Canberra, Australia	6 October 1985
Asian record	Salwa Eid Naser (BHR)	48.14	Doha, Qatar	3 October 2019
Championship record	Damayanthi Dharsha (SRI)	51.05	Jakarta, Indonesia	30 August 2000
World leading	Salwa Eid Naser (BHR)	48.67	Kingston, Jamaica	5 April 2025
Asian leading	Salwa Eid Naser (BHR)	48.67	Kingston, Jamaica	5 April 2025

== Schedule ==
The event schedule, in local time (UTC+9), was as follows:

Date	Time	Round
27 May	10:20	Heats
28 May	17:50	Final

== Results ==
=== Heats ===
Held on 27 May. First 2 in each heat (Q) and the next 2 fastest (q) qualified for the final.

==== Heat 1 ====
Place	Lane	Athlete	Nation	Time	Notes
1	2	Rupal Chaudhary	India	53.00	Q
2	8	Aminat Kamarudeen	United Arab Emirates	53.19	Q, NR
3	5	Jonbibi Hukmova	Uzbekistan	53.67	q, PB
4	3	Harshani Fernando	Sri Lanka	53.81	
5	4	Shereen Samson Vallabouy	Malaysia	54.80	
6	6	Laavinia Jaiganth	Singapore	57.71	
—	7	Gankhishig Zuunnast	Mongolia	DNS	

==== Heat 2 ====
Place	Lane	Athlete	Nation	Time	Notes
1	3	Nanako Matsumoto	Japan	52.24	Q, PB
2	2	Vithya Ramraj	India	53.32	Q
3	4	Nadeesha Ramanayake	Sri Lanka	53.77	q
4	5	Alexandra Zalyubovskaya	Kazakhstan	53.96	SB
5	6	Benny Nontanam	Thailand	54.41	PB
6	7	Kim Ju-ha	South Korea	56.96	
7	8	Irina Levina	Uzbekistan	57.19	PB

==== Heat 3 ====
Place	Lane	Athlete	Nation	Time	Notes
1	1	Nguyễn Thị Ngọc	Vietnam	54.05	Q
2	2	Liu Yinglan	China	54.51	Q
3	4	Zenab Moussa Ali Mahamat	Bahrain	54.88	
4	3	Viktoriya Zyabkina	Kazakhstan	55.70	
5	5	Kim Seo-yoon	South Korea	56.03	
6	8	Mudhawi Al-Shammari	Kuwait	58.02	
7	7	Walaʼ Mohammad Al-Qawasmi	Jordan	58.16	
8	6	Jane Christa Ming Suet Karlsson	Hong Kong	58.66	

=== Final ===
Place	Lane	Athlete	Nation	Time	Notes
1st place, gold medalist(s)	6	Nanako Matsumoto	Japan	52.17	PB
2nd place, silver medalist(s)	4	Rupal Chaudhary	India	52.68	
3rd place, bronze medalist(s)	1	Jonbibi Hukmova	Uzbekistan	52.79	PB
4	8	Vithya Ramraj	India	53.00	
5	5	Nguyễn Thị Ngọc	Vietnam	53.12	
6	3	Liu Yinglan	China	53.62	
7	2	Nadeesha Ramanayake	Sri Lanka	54.70	
—	7	Aminat Kamarudeen	United Arab Emirates	DQ	
