= 2026 Asian U23 Athletics Championships =

1st Asian U23 Athletics Championships
- Dates: 9-12 July 2026
- Host city: Ordos City, China
- Venue: Ordos Sports Development Center Stadium
- Level: Under-23
- Events: 45
- Participation: 320 athletes from 26 nations

The 2026 Asian U23 Athletics Championships was the inaugural edition of the international athletics competition for Asian under-23 athletes, organized by the Asian Athletics Association. Athletes born between 2004 and 2006 competed in 45 events, divided evenly between the sexes, and one mixed event. The competition took place over four days from the 9th to 12th of July at the Ordos Sports Development Center Stadium in Ordos City, China.

== Medal summary ==
=== Men ===
Event	Gold		Silver		Bronze	
100 metres (wind: -0.7)	Muhammad Azeem Mohd Fahmi; Malaysia	10.17	Falah Al-Khazaali; Iraq	10.21 NR	Salah Yunis; Qatar	10.23
200 metres (wind: +2.2)	Huang Youwen; China	20.43	Kota Uematsu; Japan	20.58	Abhay Singh; India	20.96
400 metres	Shinya Hayashi; Japan	45.26	Tạ Ngọc Tưởng; Vietnam	45.50 NR	Shao Zhexuan; China	45.92
800 metres	Hatim Oulghazi; Qatar	1:47.05	Hussein Loraña; Philippines	1:47.65	Shakeel; India	1:48.78
1500 metres	Takumi Shiobara; Japan	3:53.57	Zakaria El Ahlaami; Qatar	3:54.11	Ryo Higuchi; Japan	3:54.55
5000 metres	Rui Suzuki; Japan	14:01.24	Shivaji Parashuram; India	14:08.19	Vinod Singh; India	14:23.67
10,000 metres	Yoshihiro Kusuoka; Japan	29:29.34	Shivaji Parashuram; India	29:33.54	Jiang Jinzhi; China	29:42.54
110 metres hurdles (wind: +1.1)	Zhao Shiqqi; China	13.38	Zhang Zijun; China	13.41	Oumar Doudai Abakar; Qatar	13.56
400 metres hurdles	Xu Xinfeng; China	48.68 =NR	Ayomal Akalanka Kuda Liyange; Sri Lanka	49.03 NR	Ye Anan; China	49.04
3000 metres steeplechase	Zakaria Al-Ahlaami; Qatar	8:54.32	Tetsu Sasaki; Japan	8:56.99	Chen Wenjie; China	9:05.00
4 × 100 metres relay	China; Xia Jianduo; Liu Yulong; Chen Jiahao; Wu Haolin	38.38	Hong Kong; James Chan; Cheng Cheung Hung; Magnus Johannsson; Chung Tsz Sing	38.88	Malaysia; Muhammad Azeem Mohd Fahmi; Reeve Kua Man Hong; Pengiran Aidil Auf Hajam; Mohamad Armin Zahryl	39.20
4 × 400 metres relay	China; Shi Jun; Xiao Heng; Li Yifan; Shao Zhexuan	3:03.46	India; Astik Pradhan; Sharan Megavarnam; Setu Mishra; Aman Choudhary	3:04.24	Qatar; Mahamat Abakar Abdrahman; Hatim Ait Oulghazi; Khalid Wadi Adoum; Mubarak Abdulkarim Musa	3:06.19
Half marathon walk	Sotaro Osaka; Japan	1:26:11	Kaiyuan Yang; China	1:26:12	Taisei Yoshizako; Japan	1:27:15
High jump	Amir Nagayev; Uzbekistan	2.16 m	Hu Chen; China	2.13 m	Lo Tzu-Chieh; Chinese Taipei	2.13 m
Pole vault	Seif Heneida; Qatar	5.45 m	Liu Rui; China	5.20 m	Maxim Balabin; Kazakhstan	5.05 m
Long jump	Xu Zhuofan; China	7.87 m	Takuma Sekine; Japan	7.85 m	Wang Maisong; China	7.85 m
Triple jump	Ma Yinglong; China	17.11 m	Ibrokhim Mahkamov; Uzbekistan	16.34 m	Kim Dong-Hyeak; South Korea	16.08 m
Shot put	Zhang Zhenyu; China	19.40 m	Djibrine Adoum Ahmat; Qatar	19.18 m	Xia Guoyuan; China	17.75 m
Discus throw	Li Zhixin; China	60.79 m	Jiang Zehao; China	59.60 m	Bhartpreet Singh; India	52.91 m
Hammer throw	Li Zixu; China	71.47 m	Ayubkhon Fayezov; Uzbekistan	71.16 m	Xu Zheng; China	68.59 m
Javelin throw	Anand Singh; India	80.57 m	Wang Xiaobo; China	79.41 m	Shivam Satish; India	77.70 m
Decathlon	Yuto Yamamoto; Japan	7395 pts	Wang Jiawei; China	7286 pts	Zhu Chenghao; China	7071 pts

=== Women ===
Event	Gold		Silver		Bronze	
100 metres (wind: +0.7 m/s)	Xue Kunzhi; China	11.37	Aiha Yamagata; Japan	11.44	Liu Xiajun; China	11.53
200 metres (wind: +1.5 m/s)	Jiang Yutong; China	23.47	Lê Thị Cẩm Tú; Vietnam	23.50	Ami Takahashi; Japan	23.66
400 metres	Dhzonbibi Khukmova; Uzbekistan	51.19	Naomi Johnson; Philippines	52.34	Jithma Wijethunga; Sri Lanka	53.10
800 metres	Dhzonbibi Khukmova; Uzbekistan	2:08.41	Kurumi Sugure; Japan	2:09.42	Huidrom Bhumeshwory; India	2:10.20
1500 metres	Li Yuan; China	4:19.88	Ye Shuqi; China	4:20.15	Airi Tajima; Japan	4:21.09
5000 metres	Li Yuan; China	16:45.07	Koharu Chugo; Japan	16:50.62	Lê Thị Tuyết; Vietnam	17:05.30
10,000 metres	Kana Mizumoto; Japan	33:24.87	Yang Yiting; China	33:43.54	Lê Thị Tuyết; Vietnam	34:47.53
100 metres hurdles (wind: +0.1 m/s)	Yi Bo-an; Chinese Taipei	13.28	Ami Takahashi; Japan	13.31	Wu Anqi; China	13.34
400 metres hurdles	Chung Hsin-ju; Chinese Taipei	57.41	Nurkhon Ochilova; Uzbekistan	57.99	Shravani Sachin; India	58.09
3000 metres steeplechase	Yang Yiting; China	10:14.68	Liu Yuxin; China	10:25.51	Prachi Devkar; India	10:32.69
4 × 100 metres relay	China; Liu Xiajun; Li Huixian; Jian Rujing; Xue Kunzhi	43.75	India; Sanjana; Akshaya Saravanan; Sudheeksha Vadluri; Shreeya Rajesh	44.68	Kazakhstan; Anna Shumilo; Yekaterina Puzyreva; Tatyana No; Darya Gridassova	50.90
4 × 400 metres relay	India; Shravani Sachin Sangle; Sandramol Sabu; Pravalika Narimalla; Nofisa Khatun	3:33.62	China; Li Xueqi; Dong Xinyi; Wang Shiyu; Jiang Yutong	3:35.14	Kazakhstan; Anna Shumilo; Anastasiya Tsvirkunova; Ekaterina Koloda; Mariya Shuvalova	3:37.65
Half marathon walk	Ning Jinlin; China	1:38:24	Dou Maocuo; China	1:39:01	Yasmina Toxanbayeva; Kazakhstan	1:41:26
High jump	Valeriya Gorbatova; Uzbekistan	1.85 m	Barmo Sayfullayeva; Uzbekistan	1.83 m	Jin Ruoxuan; China	1.83 m
Pole vault	Wei Lingxia; China	4.20 m	Sora Murata; Japan	4.10 m	Mitsuki Kobayash; Japan	4.00 m
Long jump	Huang Yingying; China	6.48 m	Anastasiya Rypakova; Kazakhstan	6.11 m	Hà Thị Thúy Hằng; Vietnam	6.10 m
Triple jump	Sharifa Davronova; Uzbekistan	14.24 m	Zhou Hui; China	13.56 m	Madushani Herath; Sri Lanka	13.25 m
Shot put	Ding Zhuhui; China	17.15 m	Chiang Ching-yuan; Chinese Taipei	16.82m	Tian Xinyi; China	14.99 m
Discus throw	Jiang Zhichao; China	58.63 m	Huang Jingru; China	55.33 m	Priya; India	50.44 m
Hammer throw	Wang Ziyi; China	71.04 m	Fang Ling; China	70.88 m	Raika Murakami; Japan	68.83 m
Javelin throw	Chu Pin-hsun; Chinese Taipei	57.31 m	Zhang Xidan; China	54.59 m	Aoi Murakami; Japan	54.40 m
Heptathlon	Hu Xingyu; China	5802 pts	Alina Chistyakova; Kazakhstan	5737 pts	Ugiloy Norboyeva; Uzbekistan	5572 pts

=== Mixed ===
Event	Gold		Silver		Bronze	
4 × 400 metres relay	India; Astik Pradhan; Sandramol Sabu; Setu Mishra; Shravani Sachin Sangle	3:18.64	China; Li Yifan; Jiang Yutong; Ye Hongxiang; Huang Yingying	3:18.74	Philippines; Jazzpeer Arcenal; Lea Kriszeda Ordinario; Hussein Loraña; Naomi Johnson	3:25.28

== Medal table ==
* Host nation (China)

Rank	Nation	Gold	Silver	Bronze	Total
1	China*	23	17	12	52
2	Japan	7	8	7	22
3	Uzbekistan	5	4	1	10
4	India	3	4	9	16
5	Qatar	3	2	3	8
6	Chinese Taipei	3	1	1	5
7	Malaysia	1	0	1	2
8	Kazakhstan	0	2	4	6
9	Vietnam	0	2	3	5
10	Philippines	0	2	1	3
11	Sri Lanka	0	1	2	3
12	Hong Kong	0	1	0	1
12	Iraq	0	1	0	1
14	South Korea	0	0	1	1
Totals (14 entries)		45	45	45	135

== Participating nations ==
- Afghanistan (1)
- China (81)
- Chinese Taipei (13)
- Hong Kong (14)
- India (42)
- Iraq (4)
- Japan (36)
- Kazakhstan (20)
- Kuwait (6)
- Kyrgyzstan (5)
- Laos (2)
- Macau (1)
- Malaysia (7)
- Maldives (2)
- Mongolia (5)
- Nepal (1)
- Oman (1)
- Philippines (8)
- Qatar (9)
- Singapore (12)
- South Korea (15)
- Sri Lanka (6)
- Tajikistan (1)
- Thailand (2)
- Uzbekistan (16)
- Vietnam (10)
