= Xiong Shiqi =

Chinese athlete

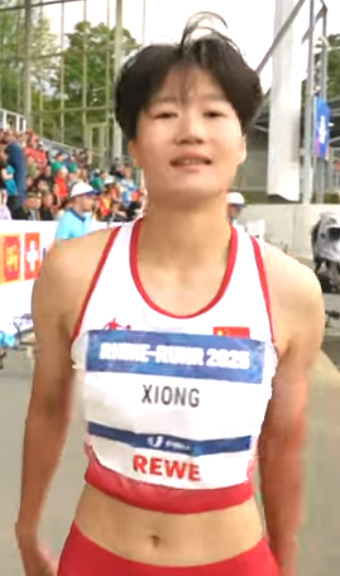
- At the 2025 Summer World University Games

Personal information
- Nationality: Chinese
- Born: 9 March 2004 (age 22)

Sport
- Sport: Athletics
- Event: Long jump

Achievements and titles
- Personal bests: Long jump: 6.73m (Hangzhou, 2023)
Medal record
Women's athletics
Representing China
Asian Games
Gold medal – first place	2022 Hangzhou	Long jump
Asian Indoor Championships
Gold medal – first place	2024 Tehran	Long jump
Gold medal – first place	2026 Tianjin	Long jump
Summer World University Games
Silver medal – second place	2025 Bochum	Long jump

Xiong Shiqi (born 9 March 2004) is a Chinese long jumper.

== Early life ==
A student at Wuhan University, she won gold in the 100 metres and the 4 × 100 m relay at the 2023 Asian U20 Athletics Championships in Yecheon, South Korea.

== Career ==
Xiong won the gold medal in the long jump at the delayed 2022 Asian Games held in Hangzhou in October 2023 with a personal best jump of 6.73 metres.

She won gold at the 2024 Asian Indoor Athletics Championships in Tehran in the long jump. She finished fourth at the 2024 Diamond League Shanghai in the long jump in April 2024. She competed in the long jump at the 2024 Paris Olympics.

In September 2025, she competed at the 2025 World Championships in Tokyo, Japan.

In February 2026, she won the gold medal in the long jump at the 2026 Asian Indoor Athletics Championships in Tianjin, China, successfully defending her title. In May, she placed sixth at the 2026 Shanghai Diamond League.
