= 2021 World Athletics U20 Championships – Women's long jump =

Women's long jump at the 2021 World Athletics U20 Championships
- Venue: Kasarani Stadium
- Dates: 20 August (qualification); 22 August (final)
- Competitors: 20 from 16 nations
- Winning distance: 6.60 m

Medalists
gold medal	Maja Åskag	Sweden
silver medal	Shaili Singh	India
bronze medal	Mariia Horielova	Ukraine

The women's long jump at the 2021 World Athletics U20 Championships was held at the Kasarani Stadium on 20 and 22 August.

== Records ==
Standing records prior to the 2021 World Athletics U20 Championships
World U20 Record	Heike Drechsler (GDR)	7.14	Bratislava, Czechoslovakia	4 June 1983
Championship Record	Fiona May (GBR)	6.82	Sudbury, Canada	30 July 1988
World U20 Leading	Mikaelle Assani (GER)	6.64	Tallinn, Estonia	17 July 2021

== Results ==
=== Qualification ===
The qualification took place on 20 August, in two groups, starting at 11:00. Athletes attaining a mark of at least 6.35 metres ( Q ) or at least the 12 best performers ( q ) qualified for the final.

Rank	Group	Name	Nationality	Round			Mark	Notes
Rank	Group	Name	Nationality	1	2	3	Mark	Notes
1	B	Shaili Singh	India	6.34	5.98	6.40	6.40	Q
2	A	Maja Åskag	Sweden	x	6.39		6.39	Q
3	A	Lissandra Campos	Brazil	x	6.36		6.36	Q
4	B	Shantae Foreman	Jamaica	x	6.27	x	6.27	q
5	B	Mariia Horielova	Ukraine	6.24	6.19	6.10	6.24	q
6	B	Tessy Ebosele	Spain	x	6.18	x	6.18	q
7	A	Natalia Linares	Colombia	6.16	5.95	6.06	6.16	q
8	B	Roksana Jędraszak	Poland	x	6.14	x	6.14	q
9	A	Evelyn Yankey	Spain	6.11	5.90	6.02	6.11	q
10	B	Karmen Fouche	South Africa	5.95	6.10	5.82	6.10	q
11	A	Anna Matuszewicz	Poland	6.08	5.92	5.88	6.08	q
12	B	Ruth Agadama	Nigeria	5.71	5.46	6.06	6.06	q
13	A	Anastassiya Rypakova	Kazakhstan	x	6.05	x	6.05	
14	A	Violetta Razbeyko	Authorised Neutral Athletes	6.01	5.87	x	6.01	
15	B	Giovana Corradi	Brazil	x	6.00	x	6.00	
16	A	Arianna Battistella	Italy	x	5.98	5.95	5.98	
17	A	Liisa-Maria Lusti	Estonia	5.98	x	5.86	5.98	
18	B	Chiara Smeraldo	Italy	5.95	x	x	5.95	
19	A	Zeddy Jesire Chongwo	Kenya	5.71	5.48	x	5.71	PB
20	B	Alexis Tilford-Rutherford	Bahamas	x	x	5.51	5.51	

=== Final ===
The final was held on 22 August at 16:28.

Rank	Name	Nationality	Round						Mark	Notes
Rank	Name	Nationality	1	2	3	4	5	6	Mark	Notes
1st place, gold medalist(s)	Maja Åskag	Sweden	6.29	6.33	6.44	6.60	x	6.48	6.60	PB
2nd place, silver medalist(s)	Shaili Singh	India	6.34	6.34	6.59 w	x	x	6.37	6.59	w
3rd place, bronze medalist(s)	Mariia Horielova	Ukraine	x	6.50	x	x	6.47	6.40	6.50	PB
4	Shantae Foreman	Jamaica	6.23	x	6.02	x	6.47	x	6.47	PB
5	Tessy Ebosele	Spain	6.46	6.28 w	6.31	x	5.72 w	6.29	6.46	
6	Lissandra Campos	Brazil	6.35	6.38	x	5.86	4.78	r	6.35	
7	Karmen Fouche	South Africa	6.32 w	6.16	6.13	6.02	6.07	x	6.32	w
8	Ruth Agadama	Nigeria	5.88	6.24	5.86 w	x	x	5.96	6.24	
9	Anna Matuszewicz	Poland	6.02	6.15	5.98				6.15	
10	Roksana Jędraszak	Poland	x	6.07	5.95				6.07	
11	Evelyn Yankey	Spain	5.90	4.62	4.64				5.90	
12	Natalia Linares	Colombia	x	x	5.66				5.66	
