= Rupal Chaudhary =

Indian athlete

Personal information
- Born: 23 December 2004 (age 21) Shahpur Jainpur, Uttar Pradesh, India

Sport
- Sport: Track and field
- Event: 400 m

Achievements and titles
- Personal best: 51.85 (2022)
Medal record
Women's athletics
Representing India
Asian Championships
Gold medal – first place	2025 Gumi	4x400m mixed
Gold medal – first place	2025 Gumi	4x400m
Silver medal – second place	2025 Gumi	400 m
World U20 Championships
Silver medal – second place	2022 Cali	4×400m mixed
Bronze medal – third place	2022 Cali	400 m

Rupal Chaudhary (born 23 December 2004) is an Indian track and field athlete specializing in 400 m events.

== Early life ==
She comes from Shahpur Jainpur village in the Meerut district of Uttar Pradesh.

== Career ==
In 2022, Rapul defeated pre-race favourite Priya Mohan to win the women's 400m at the Indian National U-20 Federation Cup Athletics Championships. Later that year, she was a bronze medalist at the 2022 World Athletics U20 Championships in Cali, Colombia in the 400 metres, setting a new personal best time of 51.85 seconds. At the same event she also won silver in the Mixed 4 × 400 m relay in an Asian U20 record time. In doing so, she became the first Indian athlete to win two medals at the World U-20 Athletics Championships.

She suffered a knee injury which ruled her out of the entire 2023 season.

She ran as part of the Indian 4 × 400 m relay team at the 2024 World Relays Championships which qualified for the 2024 Paris Olympics, in Nassau, Bahamas in May 2024.

She competed at the 2025 World Athletics Relays in China in the Mixed 4 × 400 metres relay in May 2025. Later that month, she won a silver medal in the 400 metres at the 2025 Asian Athletics Championships, as well as gold medals in the women's 4 x 400 metres relay and the mixed 4 x 400 metres relay.
