= Athletics at the 2025 Summer World University Games – Women's long jump =

Women's long jump at the 2025 Summer World University Games
- Venue: Lohrheidestadion
- Location: Bochum, Germany
- Dates: 21 July (qualification); 22 July (final)
- Competitors: 47 from 34 nations
- Winning distance: 6.70 m

Medalists
gold medal	Agate de Sousa	Portugal
silver medal	Xiong Shiqi	China
bronze medal	Natalia Linares	Colombia

The women's long jump event at the 2025 Summer World University Games was held in Bochum, Germany, at Lohrheidestadion on 21 and 22 July.

== Records ==
Prior to the competition, the records were as follows:

Record	Athlete (nation)	Distance (m)	Location	Date
Games record	Irina Valyukevich (URS)	7.04 m	Kobe, Japan	4 September 1985

== Results ==
=== Qualification ===
All athletes over 6.55 m (Q) or at least the 12 best performers (q) advance to the final.

==== Group A ====
Place	Athlete	Nation	#1	#2	#3	Result	Notes
1	Xiong Shiqi	China	6.41 (−1.5 m/s)	6.31 (−0.4 m/s)	-	6.41 m (−1.5 m/s)	q
2	Samantha Dale	Australia	6.38 (−0.7 m/s)	6.25 (−0.1 m/s)	6.06 (−0.2 m/s)	6.38 m (−0.7 m/s)	q
3	Samira Attermeyer	Germany	x	6.07 (−0.3 m/s)	6.22 (+0.9 m/s)	6.22 m (+0.9 m/s)	q
4	Ancy Sojan	India	x	5.97 (−1.0 m/s)	6.20 (−0.4 m/s)	6.20 m (−0.4 m/s)	q
5	Nikola Horowska	Poland	x	6.11 (−2.0 m/s)	x	6.11 m (−2.0 m/s)	
6	Ida Beiter Bomme	Denmark	x	6.10 (+0.3 m/s)	5.91 (−1.0 m/s)	6.10 m (+0.3 m/s)	
7	Iben Carnhed	Norway	5.89 (−0.8 m/s)	6.05 (+0.3 m/s)	6.07 (−0.9 m/s)	6.07 m (−0.9 m/s)	
8	Miu Kimura	Japan	6.02 (−0.6 m/s)	6.03 (−0.9 m/s)	x	6.03 m (−0.9 m/s)	
9	Urša Matotek	Slovenia	x	5.61 (−1.1 m/s)	5.90 (−2.2 m/s)	5.90 m (−2.2 m/s)	
10	Ilse Steigenga	Netherlands	x	x	5.90 (+0.4 m/s)	5.90 m (+0.4 m/s)	
11	Cleo Martin-Evans	Great Britain	5.89 (+0.1 m/s)	5.67 (−1.0 m/s)	5.65 (+0.5 m/s)	5.89 m (+0.1 m/s)	
12	Celia Markovinovic	Canada	5.74 (−0.3 m/s)	5.86 (−1.3 m/s)	x	5.86 m (−1.3 m/s)	
13	Ana Valeria Frayre	Mexico	5.80 (+0.4 m/s)	5.55 (−0.1 m/s)	5.69 (−0.8 m/s)	5.80 m (+0.4 m/s)	
14	Klara Rådbo	Sweden	5.73 (−0.9 m/s)	x	x	5.73 m (−0.9 m/s)	
15	Gizem Akgöz	Turkey	x	5.71 (−0.5 m/s)	x	5.71 m (−0.5 m/s)	
16	Wickramasinghe Arachchi	Sri Lanka	5.70 (−0.3 m/s)	5.49 (−0.2 m/s)	5.20 (+0.4 m/s)	5.70 m (−0.3 m/s)	
17	Saana Peura	Finland	x	x	5.65 (−0.7 m/s)	5.65 m (−0.7 m/s)	
18	Yana Sargsyan	Armenia	5.54 (−2.0 m/s)	5.52 (±0.0 m/s)	5.42 (−0.3 m/s)	5.54 m (−2.0 m/s)	
19	Paige Floriea	United States	5.50 (−0.3 m/s)	x	x	5.50 m (−0.3 m/s)	
20	Winfred Atimango	Uganda	5.19 (−0.5 m/s)	5.25 (−0.1 m/s)	5.00 (−0.4 m/s)	5.25 m (−0.1 m/s)	
21	Emersiana Naman	Tanzania	x	x	3.55 (−1.1 m/s)	3.55 m (−1.1 m/s)	
—	Ala'a Al-Zadjali	Oman	x	x	x	NM	
—	Maria Candido Teixeira	Brazil	x	x	x	NM	

==== Group B ====
Place	Athlete	Nation	#1	#2	#3	Result	Notes
1	Delta Amidzovski	Australia	6.57 (+0.8 m/s)			6.57 m (+0.8 m/s)	Q, SB
2	Agate de Sousa	Portugal	6.29 (−0.4 m/s)	x	6.52 (−0.7 m/s)	6.52 m (−0.7 m/s)	q
3	Pauline Hondema	Netherlands	6.38 (−0.3 m/s)	6.46 (+1.0 m/s)	4.75 (+1.2 m/s)	6.46 m (+1.0 m/s)	q
4	Natalia Linares	Colombia	6.32 (±0.0 m/s)	6.42 (+1.3 m/s)	6.30 (−0.4 m/s)	6.42 m (+1.3 m/s)	q
5	Diana Myroshnichenko	Ukraine	6.33 (−1.0 m/s)	6.17 (−1.3 m/s)	5.99 (−1.9 m/s)	6.33 m (−1.0 m/s)	q
6	Carmen Rosales	Spain	6.23 (−0.1 m/s)	x	6.31 (−2.0 m/s)	6.31 m (−2.0 m/s)	q
7	Hannah Hagerty	Canada	x	5.89 (+0.1 m/s)	6.28 (−1.7 m/s)	6.28 m (−1.7 m/s)	q, PB
8	Ha Thi Thuy Hang	Vietnam	6.12 (+2.2 m/s)	x	5.89 (−0.6 m/s)	6.12 m (+2.2 m/s)	q
9	Roksana Jędraszak	Poland	x	6.11 (−0.5 m/s)	5.63 (−2.2 m/s)	6.11 m (−0.5 m/s)	
10	Vanessa Sena	Brazil	6.08 (−0.3 m/s)	x	5.88 (−1.1 m/s)	6.08 m (−0.3 m/s)	
11	Finja Köchling	Germany	x	6.03 (+0.5 m/s)	5.80 (−1.2 m/s)	6.03 m (+0.5 m/s)	
12	Ruby Jerges	Great Britain	x	6.02 (+0.2 m/s)	x	6.02 m (+0.2 m/s)	
13	Moumita Mondal	India	x	5.97 (+0.7 m/s)	6.00 (−0.7 m/s)	6.00 m (−0.7 m/s)	
14	Kajsa Lindqvist	Sweden	x	x	5.98 (−2.0 m/s)	5.98 m (−2.0 m/s)	
15	Magdalena Perić	Croatia	x	5.79 (−1.1 m/s)	5.89 (−0.3 m/s)	5.89 m (−0.3 m/s)	
16	Mizuki Otsu	Japan	5.82 (+0.7 m/s)	5.87 (−0.8 m/s)	5.85 (−1.5 m/s)	5.87 m (−0.8 m/s)	
17	Barbara Štuhec	Slovenia	5.85 (+2.1 m/s)	x	5.68 (−0.4 m/s)	5.85 m (+2.1 m/s)	
18	Michaela Comová	Slovakia	5.82 (+1.5 m/s)	4.22 (−0.5 m/s)	5.65 (−1.0 m/s)	5.82 m (+1.5 m/s)	
19	Eliise Anijalg	Estonia	5.68 (+1.0 m/s)	5.34 (−0.4 m/s)	5.38 (−1.0 m/s)	5.68 m (+1.0 m/s)	
20	Ida Rasmussen	Denmark	5.25 (+1.3 m/s)	5.66 (−1.7 m/s)	5.10 (−0.9 m/s)	5.66 m (−1.7 m/s)	
21	Ayoung Kim	South Korea	x	5.63 (+0.1 m/s)	5.22 (−2.2 m/s)	5.63 m (+0.1 m/s)	
22	Anastassija Rypakowa	Kazakhstan	x	x	5.52 (−2.3 m/s)	5.52 m (−2.3 m/s)	
23	Polline Apiyo	Uganda	x	5.28 (−2.6 m/s)	5.16 (−2.8 m/s)	5.28 m (−2.6 m/s)	
24	Amtul Rehman	Pakistan	x	5.19 (−2.9 m/s)	x	5.19 m (−2.9 m/s)	

=== Final ===
Place	Athlete	Nation	#1	#2	#3	#4	#5	#6	Result	Notes
1st place, gold medalist(s)	Agate de Sousa	Portugal	6.00 (−2.4 m/s)	6.42 (−0.7 m/s)	6.70 (+1.1 m/s)	6.39 (+0.8 m/s)	4.86 (−1.2 m/s)	6.40 (−1.5 m/s)	6.70 m (+1.1 m/s)	
2nd place, silver medalist(s)	Xiong Shiqi	China	6.54 (−1.6 m/s)	6.46 (−1.3 m/s)	6.68 (+0.4 m/s)	6.44 (−0.9 m/s)	6.37 (−2.3 m/s)	6.50 (−1.0 m/s)	6.68 m (+0.4 m/s)	
3rd place, bronze medalist(s)	Natalia Linares	Colombia	6.54 (+1.4 m/s)	6.31 (−0.3 m/s)	6.67 (+1.2 m/s)	6.63 (−2.0 m/s)	6.62 (−1.1 m/s)	6.60 (−1.6 m/s)	6.67 m (+1.2 m/s)	SB
4	Delta Amidzovski	Australia	6.45 (−0.8 m/s)	6.18 (+0.7 m/s)	6.45 (+1.6 m/s)	6.50 (−0.6 m/s)	6.40 (−2.1 m/s)	x	6.50 m (−0.6 m/s)	
5	Carmen Rosales	Spain	6.45 (−0.6 m/s)	6.29 (+0.5 m/s)	6.10 (−1.3 m/s)	6.17 (−2.1 m/s)	6.00 (−1.9 m/s)	x	6.45 m (−0.6 m/s)	
6	Pauline Hondema	Netherlands	6.18 (−0.5 m/s)	6.20 (+0.4 m/s)	6.44 (−0.1 m/s)	6.22 (−2.1 m/s)	x	6.29 (−1.1 m/s)	6.44 m (−0.1 m/s)	
7	Samantha Dale	Australia	6.36 (−1.2 m/s)	x	6.03 (+0.6 m/s)	6.08 (−1.6 m/s)	6.32 (−2.2 m/s)	5.85 (−0.9 m/s)	6.36 m (−1.2 m/s)	
8	Ancy Sojan	India	6.29 (+0.9 m/s)	x	5.81 (−1.4 m/s)	6.08 (−0.6 m/s)	5.99 (−1.3 m/s)	x	6.29 m (+0.9 m/s)	
9	Diana Myroshnichenko	Ukraine	x	6.12 (−1.3 m/s)	6.16 (−1.5 m/s)				6.16 m (−1.5 m/s)	
10	Ha Thi Thuy Hang	Vietnam	5.87 (+0.3 m/s)	5.47 (−2.0 m/s)	x				5.87 m (+0.3 m/s)	
11	Hannah Hagerty	Canada	x	x	5.65 (+0.5 m/s)				5.65 m (+0.5 m/s)	
