= 2021 World Athletics U20 Championships – Women's 400 metres =

Women's 400 metres at the 2021 World Athletics U20 Championships
- Venue: Kasarani Stadium
- Dates: 18 August (heats); 21 August (final)
- Competitors: 21 from 16 nations
- Winning time: 51.55

Medalists
gold medal	Imaobong Nse Uko	Nigeria
silver medal	Kornelia Lesiewicz	Poland
bronze medal	Sylvia Chelangat	Kenya

The women's 400 metres at the 2021 World Athletics U20 Championships was held at the Kasarani Stadium 18 and 21 August.

== Records ==
Standing records prior to the 2021 World Athletics U20 Championships
World U20 Record	Grit Breuer (GER)	49.42	Tokyo, Japan	27 August 1991
Championship Record	Ashley Spencer (USA)	50.50	Barcelona, Spain	13 July 2012
World U20 Leading	Christine Mboma (NAM)	49.22	Windhoek, Namibia	17 April 2021

== Results ==
=== Heats ===
Qualification: First 2 of each heat (Q) and the 2 fastest times (q) qualified for the final.

Rank	Heat	Name	Nationality	Time	Note
1	3	Imaobong Nse Uko	Nigeria	52.33	Q
2	1	Kornelia Lesiewicz	Poland	52.63	Q
3	3	Sylvia Chelangat	Kenya	53.49	Q, PB
4	3	Priya Mohan	India	53.79	q
5	2	Oneika McAnnuff	Jamaica	54.13	Q
6	2	Precious Molepo	South Africa	54.41	Q
7	1	Ella Clayton	Canada	54.51	Q
8	1	Tetyana Kharashchuk	Ukraine	54.65	q
9	2	Anna Orlova	Ukraine	54.68	
10	2	Veronika Arkhipova	Authorised Neutral Athletes	54.87	
11	3	Erica Barbosa	Brazil	54.94	
12	2	Summy	India	55.43	
13	1	Mathilde Descoux	France	55.54	
14	2	Alexandra Almici	Italy	55.70	
15	3	Koumba Sidibe	Mali	56.49	
16	1	Annalee Robinson	Jamaica	56.56	
17	1	Opeyemi Deborah Oke	Nigeria	57.30	
18	2	Aishath Himna Hassan	Maldives	58.90	NR
	1	Lucie Zavadilová	Czech Republic	DNF	
	3	Nikola Bisová	Czech Republic	DQ	TR16.8
	3	Caitlyn Bobb	Bermuda	DQ	TR17.3.1

=== Final ===
The final was held on 21 August at 16:59.

Rank	Lane	Name	Nationality	Time	Note
1st place, gold medalist(s)	6	Imaobong Nse Uko	Nigeria	51.55	PB
2nd place, silver medalist(s)	5	Kornelia Lesiewicz	Poland	51.97	PB
3rd place, bronze medalist(s)	4	Sylvia Chelangat	Kenya	52.23	PB
4	3	Priya Mohan	India	52.77	PB
5	8	Precious Molepo	South Africa	53.98	
6	7	Ella Clayton	Canada	54.10	PB
7	1	Tetyana Kharashchuk	Ukraine	54.49	
	3	Oneika McAnnuff	Jamaica	DNS	
