= Javonya Valcourt =

Bahamian sprinter (born 2004)

Personal information
- Born: 6 December 2004 (age 21)

Sport
- Sport: Athletics

Achievements and titles
- Personal bests: 400m: 50.68 (Gainesville, 2025)
Medal record
Women's athletics
Representing Bahamas
NACAC Championships
Silver medal – second place	2025 Freeport	4x400m Mixed
CARIFTA Games Junior (U20)
Silver medal – second place	2023 Nassau	400 m

Javonya Valcourt (born 6 December 2004) is a Bahamian sprinter who primarily competes over 400 metres. She represented The Bahamas at the 2024 Olympic Games and the 2025 World Championships.

== Career ==
She studied at Queen's College before attending Montverde Academy in Montverde, Florida, and then majoring in Information Science at University of Tennessee. She competed at the 2022 World Athletics U20 Championships, in the 400 metres and the 4 × 100 metres relay, without qualifying for the final in either event.

Whilst a freshman at Tennessee, Valcourt was also a silver medalist over 400 metres at the 2023 CARIFTA Games in Nassau, The Bahamas, finishing behind Jamaica's Rickiann Russell in a time of 52.12.

Valcourt set a new personal best for the 400 metres, running 51.69 seconds in April 2024 for Tennessee. She was a semi-finalist in the 400 metres at the 2024 NCAA Division I Outdoor Track and Field Championships, in June 2024 in Eugene, Oregon. She competed in the mixed 4 x 400 metres relay at the 2024 Olympic Games in Paris, France.

Valcourt set a new personal best for the 400 metres, running 50.86 seconds in April 2025 competing for Tennessee. She was a semi-finalist at the 2025 NCAA Championships, in June 2025, in the 400 metres. She was a gold medalist at the 2025 NACAC Championships in Freeport, The Bahamas in the mixed 4x400 metres relay. The following month, she competed at the 2025 World Athletics Championships in Tokyo, Japan, in the women's 400 metres, placing seventh in her heat in 52.00 which was won by Sydney McLaughlin-Levrone.
