= 2023 Asian Athletics Championships – Women's long jump =

Women's long jump at the 2023 Asian Athletics Championships
- Venue: National Stadium
- Location: Bangkok, Thailand
- Dates: 14 July
- Competitors: 18 from 15 nations
- Winning distance: 6.97 m CR, NR

Medalists
gold medal	Sumire Hata	Japan
silver medal	Shaili Singh	India
bronze medal	Zhong Jiawei	China

The women's long jump event at the 2023 Asian Athletics Championships was held on 14 July.

== Records ==
Records before the 2023 Asian Athletics Championships
Record	Athlete (nation)	Distance (m)	Location	Date
World record	Galina Chistyakova (URS)	7.52	Leningrad, Soviet Union	11 June 1988
Asian record	Yao Weili (CHN)	7.01	Jinan, China	4 June 1993
Championship record	Guan Yingnan (CHN)	6.83	Fukuoka, Japan	19 July 1998
World leading	Ackelia Smith (JAM)	7.08	Norman, United States	13 May 2023
Asian leading	Shaili Singh (IND)	6.76	Bengaluru, India	15 April 2023

== Results ==
Rank	Name	Nationality	#1	#2	#3	#4	#5	#6	Result	Notes
1st place, gold medalist(s)	Sumire Hata	Japan	6.36	x	6.52	6.74	6.59	6.97	6.97	CR, NR
2nd place, silver medalist(s)	Shaili Singh	India	6.54	6.22	6.22	6.28	6.09	6.02	6.54	
3rd place, bronze medalist(s)	Zhong Jiawei	China	x	6.15	x	6.23	6.46	x	6.46	=PB
4	Ancy Sojan	India	6.18	6.41	x	6.25	5.97	6.24	6.41	
5	Ayaka Kōra	Japan	6.15	6.32	x	6.02	6.16	6.05	6.32	
6	Darya Reznichenko	Uzbekistan	6.04	6.24	6.17	5.81	5.99	6.05	6.24	
7	Yue Nga Yan	Hong Kong	6.15	x	6.10	x	x	6.23	6.23	PB
8	Bùi Thị Thu Thảo	Vietnam	x	6.22	x	x	x	x	6.22	
9	Maria Natalia Londa	Indonesia	5.97	x	5.75				5.97	
10	Lakshika Sarangi Silva	Sri Lanka	x	5.97	x				5.97	
11	Supawat Choothong	Thailand	5.86	x	5.31				5.86	
12	Anastasiya Rypakova	Kazakhstan	5.42	5.35	5.74				5.74	
13	Lin Tzu-chi	Chinese Taipei	5.39	x	5.73				5.73	
14	Sabina Batadzhiyeva	Kyrgyzstan	x	5.40	4.72				5.40	
15	Saina Khoshimova	Uzbekistan	x	5.04	2.99				5.04	
16	Iman Sou	Macau	5.04	x	x				5.04	
17	Yara Al-Kateeb	Jordan	4.39	4.78	4.86				4.86	PB
18	Pok Pisey	Cambodia	3.87	4.20	4.07				4.20	PB
