= Kornelia Lesiewicz =

Polish sprinter

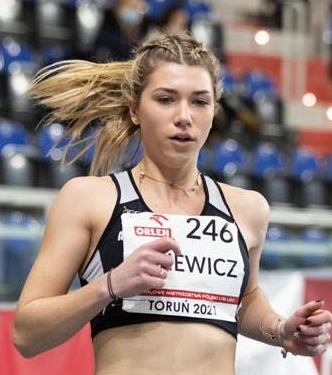
- Lesiewicz in 2021

Personal information
- Born: 14 August 2003 (age 22) Gorzów Wielkopolski, Poland

Sport
- Country: Poland
- Sport: Athletics
- Event: Sprint
- Club: AZS-AWF Gorzów

Achievements and titles
- Personal bests: 400 m: 51.97 (2021); Indoors; 400 m: 52.56i NU20R (2021)
Medal record
Women's athletics
Representing Poland
European Indoor Championships
Bronze medal – third place	2021 Toruń	4×400 m
World Relay Championships
Silver medal – second place	2021 Chorzów	4×400 m
European Team Championships
Gold medal – first place	2021 Chorzów	4×400 m
World U20 Championships
Silver medal – second place	2021 Nairobi	400 m
Silver medal – second place	2021 Nairobi	4×400 m mixed
European U20 Championships
Gold medal – first place	2021 Tallinn	400 m

Kornelia Lesiewicz (born 14 August 2003) is a Polish athlete sprinter who specializes in the 400 metres. At the age of less than 18, she won a gold medal in the event at the 2021 European Under 20 Championships. The same year, Lesiewicz finished second at the World U20 Championships.

== Career ==
At the age of 15, Kornelia Lesiewicz finished sixth in the 400 metres at the 2019 European Youth Olympic Festival held in Baku, Azerbaijan.

In August 2020, she broke the 46-year-old national under-18 best in the 400 m in a time of 52.86 seconds at the Irena Szewińska Memorial in Bydgoszcz, Poland. In September, Lesiewicz bettered her own record clocking 52.73 s to win the Polish U18 Championships.

In 2021, the 17-year-old was a part of national 4×400 m relay team, winning a bronze medal at the European Indoor Championships – where she was the youngest athlete to win a medal, a silver at the World Relays, and a gold at the European Team Championships Super League. On 16 July, competing against sprinters up to two years her senior, Lesiewicz won a gold medal in the individual event at the European U20 Championships with a time of 52.46 s. She improved by almost half a second to take a silver at the World U20 Championships held in Nairobi, Kenya, finishing behind only Nigeria's Imaobong Nse Uko.

== Achievements ==
Representing Poland
Year	Competition	Venue	Position	Event	Notes
2019	European Youth Olympic Festival	Baku, Azerbaijan	6th	400 m	55.65
2019	European Youth Olympic Festival	Baku, Azerbaijan	4th (h)	Medley relay	2:12.33
2021	European Indoor Championships	Toruń, Poland	3rd	4 × 400 m relay	3:29.94
2021	World Relays	Chorzów, Poland	2nd	4 × 400 m relay	3:28.81
2021	European Team Championships, Super League	Chorzów, Poland	1st	4 × 400 m relay	3:26.37 EL
2021	European U20 Championships	Tallinn, Estonia	1st	400 m	52.46
2021	World U20 Championships	Nairobi, Kenya	2nd	400 m	51.97
2021	World U20 Championships	Nairobi, Kenya	2nd	4 × 400 m mixed	3:19.80
