= Kunja Rajitha =

Indian sprinter

Personal information
- Nationality: Indian
- Born: Kunja Rajitha; 1 January 2003 (age 23)

Sport
- Sport: Athletics
- Event: Sprint
Medal record
Women's athletics
Representing India
Gold medal – first place	2025 Gumi	4x400m relay

Kunja Rajitha (born January 1, 2003) is an Indian sprinter specializing in the 400 meters. In 2025, she won gold at the Asian Athletics Championships as a member of India's women's 4x400-meter relay team.

== Career ==
Rajitha made her international debut in 2021, finishing fourth with the Indian 4x400-meter relay team at the World Athletics U20 Championships in Nairobi, clocking 3:40.45. The following year, she competed at the U20 World Championships in Cali, where the team finished eighth with a time of 3:36.72.

In 2024, she became the national champion in the 4x400-meter relay.

Her breakthrough on the senior international stage came at the 2025 Asian Athletics Championships in Gumi, South Korea. Competing alongside Jisna Mathew, Rupal Chaudhary, and Subha Venkatesan, Rajitha helped secure the gold medal for India in the women's 4x400-meter relay with a time of 3:34.18.

== Personal best ==
- 400 meters: 53.71 seconds - June 27, 2024, in Tau Devi Lal Stadium, Panchkula (IND)
- 4x400 Metres Relay: 3:34.18 - August 5, 2022 in World Athletics U20 Championships, Pascual Guerrero Stadium, Cali (COL)
- 4x400 Metres Relay: 3:34.18 - May 29, 2025 in Gumi Civic Stadium, Gumi (KOR)
