= Huang Yingying =

Chinese track and field athlete (born 2004)

Personal information
- Nationality: Chinese
- Born: 18 August 2004 (age 22)

Sport
- Sport: Athletics
- Events: Long jump, Triple jump
Medal record
Women's athletics
Representing China
Asian Games
| Gold medal – first place | 2026 Aichi–Nagoya | Long jump |
| Silver medal – second place | 2026 Aichi–Nagoya | Triple jump |
Asian Indoor Championships
| Silver medal – second place | 2023 Astana | Long jump |
Asian U23 Championships
| Gold medal – first place | 2026 Ordos City | Long jump |
Asian U20 Championships
| Gold medal – first place | 2023 Yecheon | Long jump |

Huang Yingying (Chinese: 黄滢滢; born 18 August 2004) is a Chinese track and field athlete who specializes in the long jump and triple jump.

== Career ==
In February 2023, Huang competed at the 2023 Asian Indoor Athletics Championships and won a silver medal in the long jump with a jump of 6.43 metres. In June 2023, she competed at the 2023 Asian U20 Athletics Championships and won a gold medal in the long jump with a jump of 6.24 m metres.

In June 2026, she competed at the National Athletics Championships and won gold in both the long jump and triple jump events. She became the first athlete, male or female, to sweep both the long jump and triple jump titles at a single National Athletics Championships. The next month she competed at the 2026 Asian U23 Athletics Championships and won a gold medal in the long jump with a jump of 6.48 metres.

In September 2026, she competed at the 2026 Asian Games and won a gold medal in the long jump with a jump of 6.55 metres, defeating India's Ancy Sojan by two centimeters. She also won a silver medal in the triple jump with a personal best jump of 14.12 metres.
