= Heristone Wafula =

Kenyan racewalker

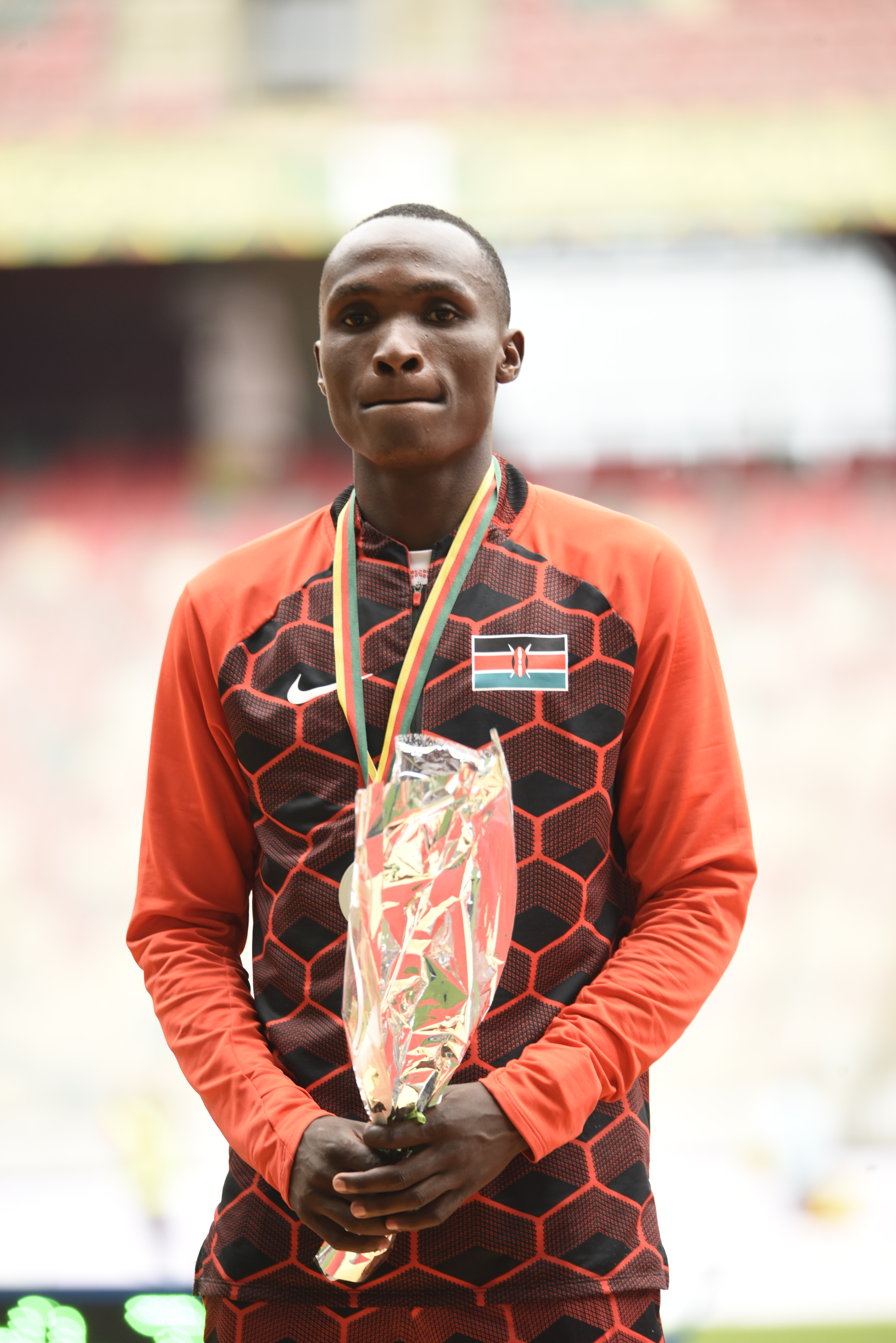

Personal information
- National team: Kenyan
- Born: 30 June 2003 (age 23)

Sport
- Country: Kenya
- Sport: Athletics
- Event: racewalking

Achievements and titles
- Personal best: 10,000 m: 42:10.84 (2021)
Medal record
African Championships
Silver medal – second place	2024 Douala	20,000 m walk
World U20 Championships
Gold medal – first place	2021 Nairobi	10,000 m walk

Heristone Wanyonyi Wafula (born 30 June 2003) is a Kenyan racewalker who specializes in the 10,000 m walk. He was the gold medallist at the World Athletics U20 Championships in 2021.
