= Evelyn Yankey =

Spanish athlete (born 2003)

Personal information
- Nationality: Spanish
- Born: 2 September 2003 (age 22) Takoradi, Ghana

Sport
- Sport: Athletics
- Event: Long jump

Achievements and titles
- Personal best(s): Long jump: 6.79 m (Soria, 2025)

Evelyn Yankey (born 2 September 2003) is a Spanish long jumper.

== Early life ==
Her father is American and her mother is Ghanaian, and she was born in Takoradi, Ghana. When she was just two months old her family moved to Valencia, Spain. Her father was a keen athletics fan and introduced her to the sport at a young age, and although she gave up the sport briefly when she was ten years-old she had restarted by the age of thirteen.

== Career ==
She finished seventh in the long jump as a 17 year-old at the 2021 European Athletics U20 Championships in Tallinn. She qualified for the final of the 2021 World Athletics U20 Championships in Nairobi, Kenya with a jump of 6.11 metres, before placing eleventh in the final.

She finished runner-up at the Spanish Athletics Championships in Nerja in June 2022; with a jump of 6.23 metres. She went on to finish seventh in the long jump at the 2022 World Athletics U20 Championships in wet conditions in Cali, Colombia with a jump of 6.21 metres. She was runner-up to Tessy Ebosele at the Spanish U23 Indoor Championships in February 2023.

She won the Spanish U23 Indoor Championships in February 2025 in Sabadell. She finished third overall at the senior Spanish Indoor Athletics Championships later that month, with a jump of 6.41 metres. Competing in Soria in June 2025, she made a personal best jump of 6.79 meters with a legal wind of +1.7 m/s to move to seventh on the Spanish all-time list. She was selected to represent Spain at the 2025 European Athletics U23 Championships in Bergen, Norway.
