= 2021 World Athletics U20 Championships – Men's 10,000 metres walk =

Men's 10,000 metres walk at the 2021 World Athletics U20 Championships
- Venue: Kasarani Stadium
- Dates: 21 August
- Competitors: 24 from 18 nations
- Winning time: 42:10.84

Medalists
gold medal	Heristone Wanyonyi	Kenya
silver medal	Amit Khatri	India
bronze medal	Paul McGrath	Spain

The men's 10,000 metres race walk at the 2021 World Athletics U20 Championships was held at the Kasarani Stadium on 21 August.

== Records ==
Standing records prior to the 2021 World Athletics U20 Championships
World U20 Record	Viktor Burayev (RUS)	38:46.4	Moscow, Russia	20 May 2000
Championship Record	Daisuke Matsunaga (JPN)	39:27.19	Eugene, United States	25 July 2014
World U20 Leading	Amit Khatri (IND)	40:40.97	Bhopal, India	27 January 2021

== Results ==
The race was held on 21 August at 09:15.

Rank	Name	Nationality	Time	Note
1st place, gold medalist(s)	Heristone Wanyonyi	Kenya	42:10.84	PB
2nd place, silver medalist(s)	Amit Khatri	India	42:17.94	
3rd place, bronze medalist(s)	Paul McGrath	Spain	42:26.11	PB
4	Dimitri Durand	France	42:47.58	PB
5	Dmitriy Gramachkov	Authorised Neutral Athletes	42:54.14	
6	Mazlum Demir	Turkey	43:01.33	
7	Mert Kahraman	Turkey	43:27.96	
8	Bryan Matías	Guatemala	43:34.02	
9	Sohail Abderahmane Aloui	Algeria	43:42.87	
10	Abdennour Ameur	Algeria	43:45.95	
11	Mateo Romero	Colombia	44:03.97	
12	Wilson Arratia Quispe	Bolivia	44:13.18	
13	Saúl Wamputsrik	Ecuador	44:38.04	
14	Francis Erick Soto	Peru	44:47.69	
15	Ahmed Chikhaoui	Tunisia	44:50.83	
16	José Luis Hidalgo	Spain	45:26.59	
17	Taras Koretskyy	Ukraine	45:34.78	
18	Jaromír Morávek	Czech Republic	45:44.72	
19	Mykola Rushchak	Ukraine	45:49.78	
20	Pedro Dias	Portugal	46:12.47	
21	Oussama Farhat	Tunisia	46:45.39	
	Emiliano Brigante	Italy	DNF	
	Christian Juárez López	Mexico	DQ	TR54.7.5
	Maksim Pyanzin	Authorised Neutral Athletes	DQ	TR54.7.5
