= 2021 World Athletics U20 Championships – Mixed 4 × 400 metres relay =

Mixed 4 × 400 metres relay at the 2021 World Athletics U20 Championships
- Venue: Kasarani Stadium
- Dates: 18 August
- Nations: 11
- Winning time: 3:19.70

Medalists
gold medal	Johnson Nnamani; Imaobong Nse Uko; Opeyemi Deborah Oke; Bamidele Ajayi; Ella Onojuvwevwo*	Nigeria
silver medal	Michał Wróbel; Kornelia Lesiewicz; Alicja Kaczmarek; Patryk Grzegorzewicz; Mateusz Matera*; Olga Rzeszewska*	Poland
bronze medal	Barath Sridhar; Priya Mohan; Summy; Kapil; Abdul Razak Cherankulangara Rasheed*	India

The Mixed 4 × 400 metres relay at the 2021 IAAF World U20 Championships was held at the Kasarani Stadium on 18 August.

== Records ==
The event of 4×400m mixed relay was put for the first time in World Athletics U20 Championships in 2021. Therefore, there was no Championship Record earlier.

== Results ==
=== Heats ===
Qualification: First 3 of each heat ( Q ) plus the 2 fastest times ( q ) qualified for the final.

Rank	Heat	Nation	Athletes	Time	Notes
1	2	Nigeria	Johnson Nnamani, Ella Onojuvwevwo, Opeyemi Deborah Oke, Bamidele Ajayi	3:21.66	Q, CR
2	1	India	Abdul Razak Cherankulangara Rasheed, Priya Mohan, Summy, Kapil	3:23.36	Q, CR
3	1	Czech Republic	Tadeáš Plaček, Nikola Bišová, Lucie Zavadilová, David Bix	3:24.15	Q, SB
4	1	Jamaica	Antonio Hanson, Alliah Baker, Dejanea Oakley, Shaemar Uter	3:24.65	Q, SB
5	1	Poland	Mateusz Matera, Olga Rzeszewska, Alicja Kaczmarek, Michał Wróbel	3:24.69	q, SB
6	1	Sri Lanka	Isuru Bans, Tharushi M.Dissanayaka, Lakshima Mendis, Dilshan Udunuwara	3:26.62	q, PB
7	2	Italy	Stefano Grendene, Federica Pansini, Angelica Ghergo, Francesco Pernici	3:28.00	Q, SB
8	2	South Africa	Ryan Jordan, Angelique Strydom, Charlize Eilerd, Adrian John Swart	3:30.43	Q, SB
9	2	Ecuador	Freddy Vásquez, Evelin Mercado, Xiomara Ibarra, Alan Minda	3:31.90	SB
	2	Kenya	Kennedy Kimeu, Sylvia Chelangat, Loice Nyanchoka Morara, Elkanah Kiprotich Chemelil	DQ	TR17.3.1
	1	Ethiopia	Nigist Getachew, Wegene Addisu, Amarech Zago, Melkeneh Azize	DQ	TR17.3.1

=== Final ===
The final was held on 18 August at 17:15.

Rank	Lane	Nation	Athletes	Time	Notes
1st place, gold medalist(s)	5	Nigeria	Johnson Nnamani, Imaobong Nse Uko, Opeyemi Deborah Oke, Bamidele Ajayi	3:19.70	CR
2nd place, silver medalist(s)	2	Poland	Michał Wróbel, Kornelia Lesiewicz, Alicja Kaczmarek, Patryk Grzegorzewicz	3:19.80	SB
3rd place, bronze medalist(s)	3	India	Barath Sridhar, Priya Mohan, Summy, Kapil	3:20.60	SB
4	8	Jamaica	Shaemar Uter, Alliah Baker, Aalliyah Francis, Malachi Johnson	3:23.04	SB
5	7	South Africa	Antonie Matthys Nortje, Precious Molepo, Angelique Strydom, Lythe Pillay	3:23.98	SB
6	4	Italy	Stefano Grendene, Alexandra Almici, Alessandra Iezzi, Tommaso Boninti	3:24.26	SB
7	1	Sri Lanka	Dilshan Udunuwara, Tharushi M.Dissanayaka, Lakshima Mendis, Isuru Bans	3:26.39	PB
8	6	Czech Republic	Tadeáš Plaček, Nikola Bišová, Lucie Zavadilová, David Bix	3:28.51	
