= Ancy Sojan =

Indian long jumper (born 2001)

Personal information
- Full name: Ancy Sojan Edappilly
- Born: 1 March 2001 (age 25) Nattika, Kerala, India
- Military career
- Branch: Indian Navy
- Service years: 2024–present
- Rank: Chief petty officer

Sport
- Sport: Athletics
- Event: Long jump

Achievements and titles
- Personal bests: 6.88 m NR (2026)
Medal record
Women's athletics
Representing India
Asian Games
Silver medal – second place	2022 Hangzhou	Long jump
Silver medal – second place	2026 Aichi–Nagoya	Long jump
Asian Championships
Silver medal – second place	2025 Gumi	Long jump
Asian Indoor Championships
Bronze medal – third place	2026 Tianjin	Long jump

Ancy Sojan Edappilly (born 1 March 2001) is an Indian long jumper. She has won silver medals at the 2022 and 2026 Asian Games, and the 2025 Asian Championships.

== Early life ==
Ancy was born on 1 March 2001 in Nattika, a small fishing village in the Thrissur district of the state of Kerala, into a modest Syrian Christian family. As a child, her father, an autorickshaw driver, would take her to the beach in her village, where she practised jumping on the loose sand. In 2024, she joined the Indian Navy through the sports quota and currently serves as a Chief petty officer. She suffers from polyendocrine metabolic ovarian syndrome (PMOS).

== Career ==
Ancy competed at the 2022 Commonwealth Games in Birmingham, where she finished 14th with a jump of 6.25 m in the qualification round and did not advance to the final.

At the 2023 Asian Championships in Bangkok, she narrowly missed the podium with a fourth-place finish jumping 6.41 m. Later at the Asian Games in Hangzhou, she won the silver medal with a jump of 6.63 m.

She won the silver medal at the 2025 Asian Championships in Gumi, with a best effort of 6.33 m. Later at the 2025 World University Games in Bochum, she placed eighth with a jump of 6.29 m. She also competed in the 4 × 100 m relay at the Games, where the team finished seventh clocking 45.06.

At the 2026 Asian Indoor Championships in Tianjin, she won the bronze medal jumping 6.21 m. She recorded a jump of 6.88 m, at the 2026 National Inter-State Championships in Bhubaneswar, breaking the 22-year-old national record of 6.83 m set by Anju Bobby George at the 2004 Athens Olympics. At the 2026 Asian Games in Nagoya, she missed out on the gold medal by just 2 cm, settling for silver with a jump of 6.53 m.

== International competitions ==
Representing India
Year	Competition	Host	Position	Result
2022	Commonwealth Games	Birmingham, England	14th (Q)	6.25 m
2023	Asian Championships	Bangkok, Thailand	4th	6.41 m
2023	Asian Games	Hangzhou, China	2nd	6.63 m
2025	Asian Championships	Gumi, South Korea	2nd	6.33 m
2025	World University Games	Bochum, Germany	8th	6.29 m
2026	Asian Indoor Championships	Tianjin, China	3rd	6.21 m
2026	Asian Games	Nagoya, Japan	2nd	6.53 m
