= Imaobong Nse Uko =

Nigerian sprinter

Personal information
- Nationality: Nigerian
- Born: 20 February 2004 (age 22) Ibeno, Akwa Ibom, Nigeria

Sport
- Sport: Athletics
- Event: 400 metres

Achievements and titles
- Personal best: 400 metres: 51.24 (Lubbock, Texas 2022)
Medal record
Women's Athletics
Representing Nigeria
World U20 Championships
| Gold medal – first place | 2021 Nairobi | 400m |
| Gold medal – first place | 2021 Nairobi | 4×400m relay |
| Gold medal – first place | 2021 Nairobi | mixed 4x400 m |

Imaobong Nse Uko (born 20 February 2004) is a Nigerian athlete. She competed in the mixed 4 × 400 metres relay event at the 2020 Summer Olympics. The 17-year-old won the 400 metres at the 2021 World Under 20 Championships.

== Career ==
Uko finished her secondary education at the Apostolic Church Secondary School, Ikot Oku Nsit. She was the Youth 400m champion at the Akwa Ibom Youth Sports Festival in 2018. She finished in second place at the meet the previous year.

At the age of 14, she became the Nigeria National Sports Festival (NSF) Champion in the 400 metres, winning the title in a personal best of 52.36s. She caused an upset which surprised the journalists and officials as she beat older and more experienced athletes to take the title. Yinka Ajayi had been in superb form that year, making the Commonwealth Games final and finishing third over the 400m at the African Championships; so she was expected to take the title. However, Ajayi, had to settle for second place behind the teenager. This occasion was when Uko announced herself to the rest of Nigeria as one to watch for the future. After the event, the Akwa Ibom government rewarded her and her coach.

She was also the 2019 Nigerian U18 Champion in the 400 metres.

She successfully defended her NSF title in 2021. During the Edo 2020 National Sports Festival, which was held in 2021 after they had been postponed due to the COVID-19 pandemic, she went under 52s for the first time. She beat Patience Okon George on that occasion to win the title in a personal best of 51.70s. She also anchored Team Akwa Ibom to a win in the Women's 4 × 400 m relay. Her performances at the Festival prompted her selection in the Nigerian team that was sent to train in the United States before the Tokyo Olympic Games. She placed third at the 2021 Nigerian Athletics Championships and Olympic Trials behind George and Knowledge Omovoh which helped secure her place on the Olympic squad.

During the World U20 Championships, she ran the second leg of the mixed 4x400 metres relay. The Nigerian team, made up of Johnson Chidera Nnamani, Uko, Opeyemi Deborah Oke and Bamidele Ajayi, won the event in a Championship record time of 3:19.70.

Uko competed for the Baylor Bears track and field team in the NCAA.

In June 2025, the Athletics Integrity Unit announced that Uko has been served with a 24-month ban backdated to July 2024 for an anti-doping rule violation in relation to whereabouts failures (e.g. missed tests). In July 2026, her ban elapsed, allowing her to compete professionally again.
