= Sumire Hata =

Japanese track and field athlete

Personal information
- Nationality: Japanese
- Born: 4 May 1996 (age 30) Japan

Sport
- Country: Japan
- Sport: Long jump, high jump
- Event: Athletics
Medal record
Women's athletics
Representing Japan
Asian Championships
Gold medal – first place	2023 Bangkok	Long jump
Asian Indoor Championships
Gold medal – first place	2023 Astana	Long jump
- Updated on June 2023

Sumire Hata (Japanese 秦澄美鈴 Hata Sumire; born 4 May 1996) is a Japanese track and field athlete who specializes in the long jump. She has also competed in the high jump early in her career. In 2023 she won gold at 2023 Asian Indoor Athletics Championships and 2023 Asian Athletics Championships.

== Career ==
Hata gained her first international experience in 2017 when she finished eleventh in the high jump at the 22nd Asian Championships held in Bhubaneswar with a jump of 1.75 m. In 2020 she won the Seiko Golden Grand Prix with 6.24 m and the following year with 6.48 m at the Ready Steady Tokyo - Athletics and with 6.47 m at the Michitaka Kinami Memorial Athletics Meet. In 2022, Hata won the Brisbane Track Classic with 6.42 m and the Michitaka Kinami Memorial Athletics Meet with 6.43 m, as well as the Seiko Golden Grand Prix with 6.62 m. Then in July she missed the 2022 World Championships held in Eugene. The following year Hata won gold for long jump at the Asian Indoor Championships held in Astana with a new championship record of 6.64m. In May she won the Shizuoka International Athletics Meet in long jump with 6.75m and in July, won gold medal at the Asian Championships in Bangkok with a new championship and national record of 6.97. She then missed the finals at the World Championships in Budapest with 6.41 m.
