= Shaili Singh =

Indian athlete (born 2004)

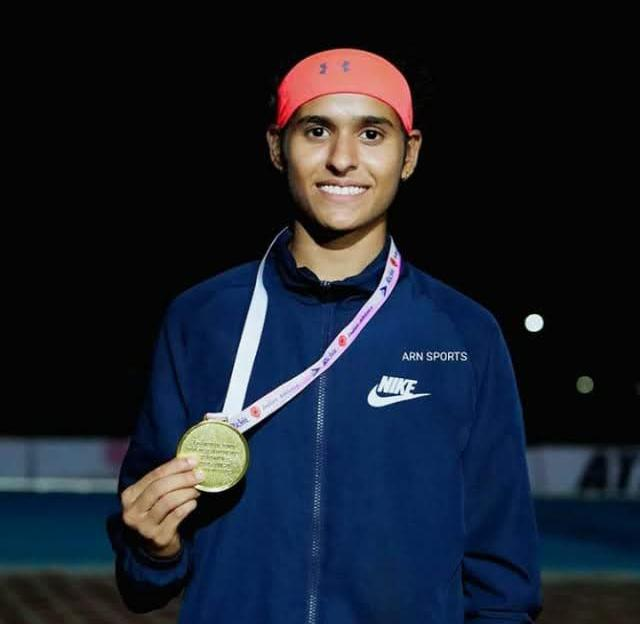
- Singh in 2021

Personal information
- Born: 7 January 2004 (age 22) Jhansi, Uttar Pradesh, India

Sport
- Sport: Track and field
- Event: Long Jump
- Coached by: Anju Bobby George

Achievements and titles
- Personal best: 6.76 m NU20R (2023)
Medal record
Women's athletics
Representing India
Asian Championships
Silver medal – second place	2023 Bangkok	Long jump
Bronze medal – third place	2025 Gumi	Long jump
World U20 Championships
Silver medal – second place	2021 Nairobi	Long jump

Shaili Singh (born 7 January 2004) is an Indian long jumper. She holds the national U20 record with a jump of 6.76 m, achieved in 2023.

== Personal life and background ==
Singh was born on 7 January 2004 in Jhansi, Uttar Pradesh India. She was raised by mother Vinita Singh, who is a single parent to three children. Vinita Singh is a small time entrepreneur by profession.

Singh moved to Bangalore at the age of 14 to train at the Anju Bobby George Sports Foundation. Singh started training under the supervision of the George couple.

== Professional achievements ==
Singh won the gold medal in long jump in the U-16 category at the Junior National athletics championship in Ranchi in 2018, where she also broke the national record for junior long jump; she recorded a 5.94-metre jump. In 2019, she bettered her own record in Under-18, jumping 6.15 meters to win the gold medal at the Junior National Athletics competition in Guntur, Andhra Pradesh. This was way ahead of the qualifying mark for participation in the IAAF Under-20 Championship in 2020. India's Minister of Sports Kiren Rijiju tweeted a congratulatory message to her on her success. In June 2021, at the senior athletic championships (National Inter-state) held in Patiala, Shaili jumped 6.48m, a new U20 record and won the long jump event while still a junior. Shaili Singh registered a jump of 6.59m to clinch the silver medal in long jump at the 2021 World Athletic U20 Championships.

== International competitions ==
Year	Competition	Venue	Position	Event	Notes
Representing India
2021	World U20 Championships	Nairobi, Kenya	2nd	Long jump	6.59 m w
2023	Asian Championships	Bangkok, Thailand	2nd	Long jump	6.54 m
2023	Asian Games	Hangzhou, China	5th	Long jump	6.48 m
2024	Asian Indoor Championships	Tehran, Iran	5th	Long jump	6.27 m
2025	Asian Championships	Gumi, South Korea	3rd	Long jump	6.30 m

== Medals ==
- Gold medal in Under 16 long jump category at National Junior Athletics Championship Ranchi 2018.
- Gold medal in Under 18 category at National Junior Athletics Championship 2019, Guntur, Andhra Pradesh.
- Silver medal in long jump at Under 20 World Athletics Championship Nairobi 2021.
- silver medal in open category at national games 2022 [Gujarat]
- Gold medal in long jump category at National Open Athletics Bangalore October 2022 - First Gold Medal at senior level.
