= Jonbibi Hukmova =

Uzbekistani sprinter (born 2005)

Personal information
- Born: 1 September 2005 (age 20)

Sport
- Sport: Athletics
- Event: Sprint

Achievements and titles
- Personal bests: 200 m: 23.79 (2025); 400 m: 51.19 (2026)
Medal record
Women's athletics
Representing Uzbekistan
Asian Championships
Bronze medal – third place	2025 Gumi	400 m
Asian Indoor Championships
Gold medal – first place	2026 Tanjijn	400 m
Asian U20 Championships
Gold medal – first place	2024 Dubai	400 m

Jonbibi Hukmova (born 1 September 2005) is an Uzbekistani sprinter who primarily competes over 400 metres. She was the 2026 Asian Indoor champion and 2024 Asian U20 champion and a bronze medalist at the 2025 Asian Athletics Championships.

== Biography ==
From the Qashqadaryo Region, Hukmova won the 400 metres title at the 2024 Asian U20 Athletics Championships in Dubai. She subsequently competed over 400 metres at the 2024 World Athletics U20 Championships in Lima, Peru.

Hukmova won the bronze medal over 400 metres at the 2025 Asian Athletics Championships in Gumi, South Korea with a personal best time of 52.79 seconds. Hukmova competed at the 2025 Summer World University Games in Bochum, Germany over 400 metres.

Hukmova won the 400 metres gold medal at the 2026 Asian Indoor Athletics Championships in Tianjin, China, running an indoors personal best time of 53.61 seconds. In July 2026, she won the 400 m gold medal at the inaugural Asian U23 Athletics Championships held in Ordos, China, with a personal best of 51.19 seconds.
