= Priya Mohan =

Indian sprinter

Personal information
- Nationality: Indian
- Born: 15 March 2003 (age 23) Karnataka

Sport
- Country: India
- Sport: Athletics
- Event: Sprinting
Medal record
Representing India
Asian Youth Athletics Championships
Silver medal – second place	2019 Hong Kong	Medley relay
World Junior Championships
Bronze medal – third place	2021 Nairobi	Mixed 4×400m Relay
Silver medal – second place	2022 Cali	Mixed 4×400m Relay
- Updated on 3 August 2022

Priya Habbathannahalli Mohan (born 15 March 2003) is an Indian athlete. She won the 400m senior National Championships in 2021 with a time of 53.29 seconds. She won the bronze medal in the mixed 4 × 400 m relay at the U-20 World Athletics Championships 2021 held at Nairobi, Kenya.

== International career ==
Year	Competition	Venue	Position	Event	Notes
Representing India
2019	Asian Youth Athletics Championships	Hong Kong	2nd	Medley relay	
2021	World Athletics U20 Championships	Nairobi, Kenya	4th	400 m	52.77 PB
2021	World Athletics U20 Championships	Nairobi, Kenya	3rd	Mixed 4 × 400 m Relay	3:20.60
