= 2026 Asian Indoor Athletics Championships – Results =

These are the results of the 2026 Asian Indoor Athletics Championships which took place between 6 and 8 February 2026 in Tianjin, China.

== Men's results ==
=== 60 metres ===
Heats – 6 February

Rank	Heat	Name	Nationality	Time	Notes
1	2	Chen Wen-pu	Chinese Taipei	6.61	Q, PB
2	2	Yuhi Mori	Japan	6.62	Q, PB
3	2	Deng Xinrui	China	6.63	Q
4	4	Jo Kum Ryong	North Korea	6.64	Q
5	1	Yoshihide Kiryū	Japan	6.67	Q, PB
6	5	Lalu Muhammad Zohri	Indonesia	6.68	Q
7	1	Imranur Rahman	Bangladesh	6.73	Q
8	3	He Jinxian	China	6.74	Q, PB
9	4	Liu Yang	China	6.75	Q
10	1	Jamie Kwok Chun Ting	Hong Kong	6.77	Q
10	4	Malham Al-Balushi	Oman	6.77	Q
12	5	Mishal Al-Mutairi	Kuwait	6.78	Q, PB
13	2	James Chan	Hong Kong	6.81	Q
13	4	Kim Si-on	South Korea	6.81	Q, PB
15	1	Mohammed Dawood Abdullah	Saudi Arabia	6.82	Q
15	5	Rashid Al-Aasmi	Oman	6.82	Q, PB
17	3	Ali Khalid Mas	Saudi Arabia	6.83	Q, PB
18	4	Chamod Yodasinghe	Sri Lanka	6.84	q
19	3	Nwamadi Joel-jin	South Korea	6.85	Q, PB
20	3	Almat Tulebaev	Kazakhstan	6.87	Q
20	5	Favoris Muzrapov	Tajikistan	6.87	Q
22	1	Yaqoub Mohamed Al-Azemi	Kuwait	6.89	q, PB
22	2	Daryl Tan	Singapore	6.89	q
24	2	Lukman Gurbandurdyyev	Turkmenistan	6.90	q
25	5	Andrew Danny	Lebanon	6.92	
26	4	Vitaliy Zems	Kazakhstan	6.93	
27	5	Kim Yun Song	North Korea	6.95	
28	1	Noureddine Hadid	Lebanon	6.97	
28	2	Shajar Abbas	Pakistan	6.97	
30	2	Chan Kin Wa	Macau	7.03	
31	3	Hassan Saaid	Maldives	7.05	
32	3	Manuja Nishshanka	Sri Lanka	7.06	
33	1	Chanyourong Noeb	Cambodia	7.08	PB
34	1	Alisher Sadulayev	Turkmenistan	7.10	
34	3	Leong Lok Io	Macau	7.10	PB
36	4	Azizjon Oripov	Uzbekistan	7.12	
	3	Manikanta Hoblidhar	India	DQ	TR16.8
	5	Umidjon Nabiev	Uzbekistan	DNF	

Semifinals – 6 February

Rank	Heat	Name	Nationality	Time	Notes
1	2	Deng Xinrui	China	6.56	Q, PB
2	3	Chen Wen-pu	Chinese Taipei	6.61	Q, =PB
3	2	Lalu Muhammad Zohri	Indonesia	6.63	Q
4	2	Yoshihide Kiryū	Japan	6.65	q, PB
5	1	Jo Kum Ryong	North Korea	6.68	Q
6	2	Chamod Yodasinghe	Sri Lanka	6.69	q
6	3	Mohammed Dawood Abdullah	Saudi Arabia	6.69	Q
8	3	Yuhi Mori	Japan	6.71	
9	1	He Jinxian	China	6.74	Q, =PB
10	3	Malham Al-Balushi	Oman	6.74 (6.738)	
11	3	Jamie Kwok Chun Ting	Hong Kong	6.74 (6.739)	PB
12	1	Imranur Rahman	Bangladesh	6.75	
13	1	Ali Khalid Mas	Saudi Arabia	6.78	PB
14	1	Kim Si-on	South Korea	6.80	PB
15	1	James Chan	Hong Kong	6.81	
16	2	Mishal Al-Mutairi	Kuwait	6.83 (6.826)	
17	2	Nwamadi Joel-jin	South Korea	6.83 (6.828)	PB
18	1	Yaqoub Mohamed Al-Azemi	Kuwait	6.84	PB
18	2	Rashid Al-Aasmi	Oman	6.84	
18	3	Liu Yang	China	6.84	
21	1	Almat Tulebaev	Kazakhstan	6.85	
22	3	Favoris Muzrapov	Tajikistan	6.86	
23	3	Lukman Gurbandurdyyev	Turkmenistan	6.87	
24	2	Daryl Tan	Singapore	6.94	

Final – 6 February

Rank	Lane	Name	Nationality	Time	Notes
1st place, gold medalist(s)	3	Deng Xinrui	China	6.59	
2nd place, silver medalist(s)	4	Chen Wen-pu	Chinese Taipei	6.60	NR
3rd place, bronze medalist(s)	2	Mohammed Dawood Abdullah	Saudi Arabia	6.62	PB
4	8	Yoshihide Kiryū	Japan	6.63	PB
5	5	Jo Kum Ryong	North Korea	6.67	
6	6	Lalu Muhammad Zohri	Indonesia	6.69	
7	1	Chamod Yodasinghe	Sri Lanka	6.74	
8	7	He Jinxian	China	6.76	

=== 400 metres ===
Heats – 6 February

Rank	Heat	Name	Nationality	Time	Notes
1	4	Ammar Ibrahim	Qatar	46.91	Q
2	1	Zhang Qining	China	47.05 (47.046)	Q, SB
3	1	Bassem Hemeida	Qatar	47.05 (47.050)	q, SB
4	2	Zheng Chiyu	China	47.55	Q
5	1	Khunaphat Kaijan	Thailand	47.71	q
6	2	Arash Sayyari	Iran	47.79	q*, PB
7	3	Fuga Sato	Japan	48.04	Q
8	4	Elnur Mukhitdinov	Kazakhstan	48.24	
9	2	Sarawut Nuansi	Thailand	48.35	
10	3	Mir Mohammad Taleei	Iran	48.38	
11	4	Youssef Karam	Kuwait	48.46	
12	3	Abbosbek Toshtemirov	Uzbekistan	48.68	PB
13	2	Meshal Abdullah Hazazi	Saudi Arabia	48.71	
14	1	Ruslan Litovski	Kyrgyzstan	49.57	SB
15	4	Khasanbek Rustamjonov	Uzbekistan	49.64	PB
16	3	Mer Sulaiman	Kuwait	49.75	
17	1	Ismail Maulana	Indonesia	50.11	
18	3	Huang Jing Song	Macau	50.51	
19	2	Cheong Chi Chong	Macau	51.38	

Final – 7 February

Rank	Lane	Name	Nationality	Time	Notes
1st place, gold medalist(s)	1	Bassem Hemeida	Qatar	47.27	
2nd place, silver medalist(s)	3	Zheng Chiyu	China	47.34	
3rd place, bronze medalist(s)	6	Arash Sayyari	Iran	47.59	PB
4	4	Fuga Sato	Japan	47.84	
5	2	Khunaphat Kaijan	Thailand	48.81	
	5	Ammar Ibrahim	Qatar	DNF	
	6	Zhang Qining	China	DNS	

=== 800 metres ===
Heats – 6 February

Rank	Heat	Name	Nationality	Time	Notes
1	2	Ko Ochiai	Japan	1:48.71	Q
2	2	Ma Zhongqiang	China	1:49.05	Q, SB
3	2	Hussein Loraña	Philippines	1:50.74	NR
4	1	Sobhan Ahmadi	Iran	1:51.29	Q
5	1	Lyu Zilong	China	1:51.30	Q, SB
6	1	Kumal Som Bahadur	Nepal	1:51.46	NR
7	3	Ibrahim Abass Chuot	Qatar	1:51.50	Q
8	3	Xi Xiaoheng	China	1:52.42	Q
9	3	Musaad Obaid Al-Subaie	Saudi Arabia	1:54.01	
10	3	Iskender Chokaev	Kyrgyzstan	1:56.83	PB
11	2	Aliakbar Allanazarov	Uzbekistan	1:57.93	TR17.3.3[L]
12	1	Faisal Maghrabi	Saudi Arabia	2:00.59	
13	2	Li Yuxuan	Macau	2:00.79	NR
14	1	Li Jia Cong	Hong Kong	2:02.70	TR17.3.3[L]

Final – 8 February

Rank	Name	Nationality	Time	Notes
1st place, gold medalist(s)	Ibrahim Abass Chuot	Qatar	1:47.64	
2nd place, silver medalist(s)	Ko Ochiai	Japan	1:48.24	
3rd place, bronze medalist(s)	Ma Zhongqiang	China	1:50.04	
4	Sobhan Ahmadi	Iran	1:50.28	
5	Lyu Zilong	China	1:50.57	SB
	Xi Xiaoheng	China	DQ	TR17.2.3

=== 1500 metres ===
Heats – 6 February

Rank	Heat	Name	Nationality	Time	Notes
1	1	Nursultan Keneshbekov	Kyrgyzstan	3:50.45	Q
2	1	Bader Al-Sweed	Kuwait	3:50.71	Q
3	1	Nanami Arai	Japan	3:50.82	Q
4	1	Amirfarzam Safari	Iran	3:50.91	Q
5	1	Liu Dezhu	China	3:53.03	Q
6	1	Pal Mukesh	Nepal	3:54.29	
7	2	Zakaria Al-Ahlaami	Qatar	3:58.22	Q
8	2	Hossein Nouri	Iran	3:58.32	Q
9	2	Tao Peilin	China	3:58.69	Q
10	2	Zhusup Sulaiman uulu	Kyrgyzstan	3:58.79	Q
11	2	Yad Hafizudin	Indonesia	4:00.65	Q
12	1	Yan Yiduo	China	4:01.36	
13	2	Sohail Amir	Pakistan	4:02.36	NR
14	2	Ouk Rohit	Cambodia	4:15.85	
15	1	Mohammad Bashir Abdullahi	Afghanistan	4:25.04	

Final – 8 February

Rank	Name	Nationality	Time	Notes
1st place, gold medalist(s)	Zakaria Al-Ahlaami	Qatar	3:43.75	
2nd place, silver medalist(s)	Nursultan Keneshbekov	Kyrgyzstan	3:44.75	NR
3rd place, bronze medalist(s)	Liu Dezhu	China	3:45.06	
4	Nanami Arai	Japan	3:45.95	
5	Bader Al-Sweed	Kuwait	3:47.68	SB
6	Amirfarzam Safari	Iran	3:49.33	
7	Hossein Nouri	Iran	3:53.57	
8	Zhusup Sulaiman uulu	Kyrgyzstan	3:54.02	PB
9	Tao Peilin	China	3:56.54	
10	Yad Hafizudin	Indonesia	4:03.79	

=== 3000 metres ===
7 February

Rank	Name	Nationality	Time	Notes
1st place, gold medalist(s)	Kazuya Shiojiri	Japan	7:53.87	
2nd place, silver medalist(s)	Nursultan Keneshbekov	Kyrgyzstan	7:55.06	NR
3rd place, bronze medalist(s)	Hossein Nouri	Iran	8:12.09	PB
4	Yu Shuiqing	China	8:18.04	
5	Zhusup Sulaiman uluu	Kyrgyzstan	8:23.71	PB
6	Muhammad Akhtar	Pakistan	8:24.53	NR
7	Chen Wenjie	China	8:34.13	
8	Yevgeniy Fadeyev	Uzbekistan	8:46.72	
9	Ouk Rohit	Cambodia	9:11.39	PB
10	Mohammad Bashir Abdullahi	Afghanistan	9:25.71	

=== 60 metres hurdles ===
Heats – 7 February

Rank	Heat	Name	Nationality	Time	Notes
1	2	David Yefremov	Kazakhstan	7.71	Q, SB
1	3	Shusei Nomoto	Japan	7.71	Q
3	1	Yaqoub Al-Youha	Kuwait	7.74	Q, SB
3	3	Chen Yuanjiang	China	7.74	Q
5	1	Liu Junxi	China	7.76	Q
5	2	Xu Zhuoyi	China	7.76	Q
7	2	John Cabang	Philippines	7.80	q
8	3	Mohamad Armin Zahryl	Malaysia	7.88	q, NR
9	1	Ang Chen Xiang	Singapore	7.89 (7.890)	PB
10	1	Liu Hiu Long	Hong Kong	7.89 (7.890)	
11	1	Ergash Normurodov	Uzbekistan	7.92	SB
12	3	Oumar Doudai Abakar	Qatar	7.93	
13	2	Kim Kyung-tae	South Korea	7.94	SB
14	3	Mohammad Al-Enezi	Kuwait	8.03	
15	2	Muhammad Naeem	Pakistan	8.17	
16	2	Swara Brian Bagas	Indonesia	8.30	
17	3	Leonid Pronzhenko	Tajikistan	8.58	

Final – 7 February

Rank	Lane	Name	Nationality	Time	Notes
1st place, gold medalist(s)	2	Liu Junxi	China	7.53	CR
2nd place, silver medalist(s)	3	Shusei Nomoto	Japan	7.59	
3rd place, bronze medalist(s)	4	Chen Yuanjiang	China	7.67	
4	6	David Yefremov	Kazakhstan	7.71 (7.707)	=SB
5	1	John Cabang	Philippines	7.71 (7.710)	
6	7	Xu Zhuoyi	China	7.77	
7	8	Mohamad Armin Zahryl	Malaysia	7.89	
	5	Yaqoub Al-Youha	Kuwait	DQ	TR16.8

=== 4 × 400 metres relay ===
8 February

Rank	Nation	Athletes	Time	Notes
1st place, gold medalist(s)	Qatar	Bassem Hemeida, Ashraf Osman, Khala Ngare Mahamat, Ismail Douda Abakar	3:08.68	
2nd place, silver medalist(s)	China	Zheng Chiyu, Liang Baotang, Ju Tianqi, Xiao Heng	3:10.49	
3rd place, bronze medalist(s)	Kazakhstan	Andrey Sokolov, Vyacheslav Zems, Madi Tokenov, Elnor Mukhitdinov	3:12.23	
4	Thailand	Khunaphat Kaijan, Nonthawat Phakdeechit, Methawi Kanhaaudom, Sarawut Nuansi	3:13.88	
5	Saudi Arabia	Meshal Abdullah Hazazi, Musaad Obaid Al-Subaie, Khalaf Abdullah Al-Bishi, Naif Rashid Al-Subaie	3:14.73	
6	Uzbekistan	Abbosbek Toshtemirov, Azizjon Oripov, Aliakbar Allanazarov, Khasanbek Rustamjonov	3:18.73	

=== High jump ===
6 February

Rank	Name	Nationality	1.95	2.00	2.05	2.10	2.15	2.19	2.23	2.27	Result	Notes
1st place, gold medalist(s)	Yuto Seko	Japan	–	–	–	o	o	xo	o	xxx	2.23	
2nd place, silver medalist(s)	Tomohiro Shinno	Japan	–	–	–	o	xo	o	xxx		2.19	
3rd place, bronze medalist(s)	Jothi Aadarsh Ram	India	–	–	o	o	xo	xxo	xxx		2.19	
4	Fu Chao-hsuan	Chinese Taipei	–	–	–	xo	o	xxx			2.15	NR
5	Zhang Hao	Chinese Taipei	–	o	o	o	xo	xxx			2.15	
6	Leonard Grospe	Philippines	–	o	o	xxx					2.05	
6	Wu Guobiao	China	–	o	o	xxx					2.05	
6	Tharinda Dasun	Sri Lanka	–	o	o	xxx					2.05	
9	Amir Nagayev	Uzbekistan	–	o	xxo	xxx					2.05	
10	Ng Chi Kit	Macau	o	o	xxx						2.00	NR
11	Dwiky Firmansyah	Indonesia	o	xo	xxx						2.00	NR
12	Khaled Al-Obaidli	Kuwait	o	xxo	xxx						2.00	
13	Ho Ho Wai	Hong Kong	xo	xxo	xxx						2.00	
14	Cheung Ming Hung	Hong Kong	o	xxx							1.95	
	Mohamed Al-Duaij	Kuwait	xxx								NM	
	Vadim Chikalov	Uzbekistan	xr								NM	

=== Pole vault ===
7 February

Rank	Name	Nationality	5.20	5.40	5.50	5.60	5.70	5.80	Result	Notes
1st place, gold medalist(s)	Ernest John Obiena	Philippines	–	–	o	–	o	xxx	5.70	
2nd place, silver medalist(s)	Li Chenyang	China	–	xo	–	xo	xxx		5.60	
3rd place, bronze medalist(s)	Chen Yang	China	o	o	xxx				5.40	
4	Patsapong Amsam-Ang	Thailand	o	xxx					5.20	
5	Masaki Ejima	Japan	xxo	xxx					5.20	

=== Long jump ===
8 February

Rank	Name	Nationality	#1	#2	#3	#4	#5	#6	Result	Notes
1st place, gold medalist(s)	Zhang Mingkun	China	7.81	7.97	7.72	8.01	7.98	7.91	8.01	
2nd place, silver medalist(s)	Lin Yu-tang	Chinese Taipei	x	x	7.87	7.57	–	–	7.87	
3rd place, bronze medalist(s)	Shu Heng	China	x	x	7.73	x	7.82	7.73	7.82	
4	Shahnavaz Khan	India	7.70	x	x	7.68	7.65	7.59	7.70	
5	Chan Ming Tai	Hong Kong	7.39	x	x	7.37	x	7.56	7.56	
6	Abdullah Al-Azmi	Kuwait	7.19	6.96	7.24	7.48	7.48	7.33	7.48	PB
7	Wong Pak Hang	Hong Kong	7.29	7.37	7.36	x	x	7.45	7.45	
8	Gao Peiqi	China	7.41	7.30	x	x	–	–	7.41	
9	Chathan Veettil Anurag	India	7.22	6.99	7.01				7.22	
10	Andrew George Medina	Singapore	x	6.77	6.97				6.97	
11	Ma Chong Kun	Macau	x	x	6.94				6.94	
12	Salim Dewan	Nepal	6.50	6.50	6.84				6.84	
13	Timur Isakov	Kyrgyzstan	6.82	x	x				6.82	
14	Feng Han Lin	Singapore	6.77	6.72	–				6.77	
15	Cheong Hoi Kit	Macau	6.71	x	6.40				6.71	

=== Triple jump ===
6 February

Rank	Name	Nationality	#1	#2	#3	#4	#5	#6	Result	Notes
1st place, gold medalist(s)	Su Wen	China	16.31	x	x	16.53	16.55	x	16.55	
2nd place, silver medalist(s)	Jiao Xinping	China	16.47	16.07	15.97	–	–	–	16.47	
3rd place, bronze medalist(s)	Ma Yinglong	China	16.11	16.45	16.29	14.35	–	15.95	16.45	
4	Praveen Chithravel	India	15.66	16.06	15.67	16.03	16.14	16.22	16.22	
5	Pasindu Malshan	Sri Lanka	x	x	15.70	15.47	15.21	15.24	15.70	
6	Mohammad Amin Al-Salami	Syria	14.99	x	15.46	15.46	x	x	15.46	
7	Andre Anura	Malaysia	x	x	14.97	15.15	14.97	x	15.15	
8	Gabriel Lee	Singapore	15.08	14.55	14.24	x	x	x	15.08	

=== Shot put ===
8 February

Rank	Name	Nationality	#1	#2	#3	#4	#5	#6	Result	Notes
1st place, gold medalist(s)	Chen Chengyu	China	18.51	19.21	19.72	19.37	19.35	20.07	20.07	CR
2nd place, silver medalist(s)	Tajinderpal Singh Toor	India	19.49	x	19.85	20.05	x	x	20.05	NR
3rd place, bronze medalist(s)	Xing Jialiang	China	19.05	19.47	19.99	x	19.76	19.30	19.99	
4	Hassan Ajamibakhtiarvand	Iran	19.15	19.29	19.39	19.36	x	19.32	19.39	
5	Samardeep Gill	India	18.90	18.77	x	x	18.37	18.97	18.97	
6	Husain Al-Naser	Kuwait	14.97	15.24	x	15.40	15.66	16.50	16.50	
7	Gurbannazar Kakajayev	Turkmenistan	13.90	14.82	x	15.75	15.57	x	15.75	

=== Heptathlon ===
7–8 February

The highest mark recorded in each event is highlighted in yellow

Rank	Athlete	Nationality	60m	LJ	SP	HJ	60m H	PV	1000m	Points	Notes
1st place, gold medalist(s)	Tejaswin Shankar	India	7.11	7.53	13.63	2.23	8.02	4.20	2:43.91	5993	CR, NR
2nd place, silver medalist(s)	Hua Zihui	China	7.06	7.37	13.70	1.96	8.43	4.70	2:45.60	5749	
3rd place, bronze medalist(s)	Yuma Maruyama	Japan	7.07	7.02	13.79	1.84	8.31	4.80	2:43.87	5637	
4	Fei Xiang	China	7.24	7.12	13.08	1.96	8.23	4.70	2:46.08	5631	
5	Zakhriddin Shokirov	Uzbekistan	7.27	7.15	13.39	1.93	8.48	4.20	3:05.23	5222	
	Nodir Norboyev	Uzbekistan	7.09	7.42	13.89	1.87	DNS	–	–	DNF	
	Zhang Wenxi	China	6.95	7.18	13.14	1.87	DNS	–	–	DNF	

== Women's results ==
=== 60 metres ===
Heats – 7 February

Rank	Heat	Name	Nationality	Time	Notes
1	3	Liao Yan-chun	Chinese Taipei	7.31	Q
2	1	Xu Jialu	China	7.36	Q, PB
3	3	Liu Xiajun	China	7.41	Q, PB
4	2	Jirapat Khanonta	Thailand	7.47 (7.462)	Q
5	2	Pan Yue	China	7.47 (7.468)	Q
6	1	Dana Noor Salem	Qatar	7.49	Q, PB
7	3	Nithya Gandhe	India	7.50	q, PB
8	1	Abinaya Rajarajan	India	7.50	q, PB
9	3	Leung Kwan Yi	Hong Kong	7.55	q*
10	2	Mudhawi Al-Shammari	Kuwait	7.59	SB
11	2	Valentina Meredova	Turkmenistan	7.61 (7.606)	
12	2	Jonbibi Hukmova	Uzbekistan	7.61 (7.607)	PB
13	2	Yu Pui Yi	Hong Kong	7.63	=PB
14	3	Shava Salvia Waranggani	Indonesia	7.65	
15	1	Olga Safronova	Kazakhstan	7.71	
16	2	Munkhtumen Otgonpurev	Mongolia	7.79	NR
17	3	Haya Kobrosly	Lebanon	7.82	
18	1	Ahnaa Nizaar	Maldives	7.83	PB
18	3	Enejan Esedova	Turkmenistan	7.83	PB
20	1	Sin Wai Nam	Macau	7.97	PB
21	1	Tameen Khan	Pakistan	7.98	

Final – 7 February

Rank	Lane	Name	Nationality	Time	Notes
1st place, gold medalist(s)	6	Xu Jialu	China	7.28	PB
2nd place, silver medalist(s)	5	Liao Yan-chun	Chinese Taipei	7.30	NR
3rd place, bronze medalist(s)	4	Liu Xiajun	China	7.38	PB
4	3	Jirapat Khanonta	Thailand	7.44	
5	7	Dana Noor Salem	Qatar	7.46	PB
6	2	Pan Yue	China	7.47	
7	8	Nithya Gandhe	India	7.49	PB
8	1	Leung Kwan Yi	Hong Kong	7.64	
	1	Abinaya Rajarajan	India	DNS	

=== 400 metres ===
Heats – 6 February

Rank	Heat	Name	Nationality	Time	Notes
1	2	Jonbibi Hukmova	Uzbekistan	54.21	Q, PB
2	2	Zahra Zarei	Iran	54.45	Q, PB
3	2	Adelina Zems	Kazakhstan	54.94	q
4	1	Zuo Siyu	China	55.41	Q
5	1	Li Fengdan	China	55.48	Q
6	1	Mariya Shuvalova	Kazakhstan	55.84	q
7	1	Munkhtumen Otgonpurev	Mongolia	56.40	NR
8	2	Zhou Li	China	56.64	SB
9	1	Enejan Esedova	Turkmenistan	58.57	
10	2	Laavina Jaiganth	Singapore	59.14	NR

Final – 7 February

Rank	Lane	Name	Nationality	Time	Notes
1st place, gold medalist(s)	5	Jonbibi Hukmova	Uzbekistan	53.61	PB
2nd place, silver medalist(s)	3	Zahra Zarei	Iran	54.18	PB
3rd place, bronze medalist(s)	6	Zuo Siyu	China	54.62	SB
4	2	Adelina Zems	Kazakhstan	54.82	
5	4	Li Fengdan	China	55.18	
6	1	Mariya Shuvalova	Kazakhstan	55.59	

=== 800 metres ===
Heats – 6 February

Rank	Heat	Name	Nationality	Time	Notes
1	2	Sabokhat Samiyonova	Uzbekistan	2:09.72	Q, PB
2	2	Toktam Dastarbandan	Iran	2:09.81	Q
3	2	Rao Xinyu	China	2:09.88	q
4	2	Ekaterina Koloda	Kazakhstan	2:12.64	q
5	1	Wu Hongjiao	China	2:15.77	Q
6	1	Akbayan Nurmamet	Kazakhstan	2:15.99	Q
7	1	Deng Yue	China	2:16.66	
8	1	Nimali Waliwarsha	Sri Lanka	2:17.75	
9	1	Amal Al-Roumi	Kuwait	2:21.55	

Final – 8 February

Rank	Name	Nationality	Time	Notes
1st place, gold medalist(s)	Wu Hongjiao	China	2:08.56	
2nd place, silver medalist(s)	Sabokhat Samiyonova	Uzbekistan	2:09.58 (2:09.575)	TR17.3.3[L]
3rd place, bronze medalist(s)	Toktam Dastarbandan	Iran	2:09.58 (2:09.576)	SB, TR17.3.3[L]
4	Rao Xinyu	China	2:09.67	
5	Akbayan Nurmamet	Kazakhstan	2:11.82	
6	Ekaterina Koloda	Kazakhstan	2:12.04	

=== 1500 metres ===
6 February

Rank	Name	Nationality	Time	Notes
1st place, gold medalist(s)	Nozomi Tanaka	Japan	4:19.15	
2nd place, silver medalist(s)	Li Chunhui	China	4:19.54	
3rd place, bronze medalist(s)	Norah Jeruto	Kazakhstan	4:20.04	SB
4	Rong Rong	China	4:22.92	
5	Wu Hongjiao	China	4:25.91	
6	Darya Miller	Kazakhstan	4:27.09	PB
7	Nguyễn Thị Oanh	Vietnam	4:27.53	
8	Sabokhat Samiyonova	Uzbekistan	4:29.45	PB
9	Nimali Waliwarsha	Sri Lanka	4:46.71	
10	Vanessa Lee Ying Zhuang	Singapore	5:09.76	NR

=== 3000 metres ===
7 February

Rank	Name	Nationality	Time	Notes
1st place, gold medalist(s)	Norah Jeruto	Kazakhstan	8:46.87	NR
2nd place, silver medalist(s)	Nozomi Tanaka	Japan	8:48.22	
3rd place, bronze medalist(s)	Luo Xia	China	9:16.18	PB
4	Yang Yiting	China	9:18.07	SB
5	Nguyễn Thị Oanh	Vietnam	9:21.13	
6	Rasara Wijesuriya	Sri Lanka	9:22.97	PB
7	Zhang Shanshan	China	9:26.22	SB
8	Odekta Elvina Naibaho	Indonesia	9:58.72	
9	Vanessa Lee Ying Zhuang	Singapore	10:29.87	NR
10	Wilna Selvi	Indonesia	10:49.55	

=== 60 metres hurdles ===
Heats – 8 February

Rank	Heat	Name	Nationality	Time	Notes
1	2	Zhang Po-ya	Chinese Taipei	8.18	Q
2	1	Hitomi Nakajima	Japan	8.20	Q
2	2	Chisato Kiyoyama	Japan	8.20	Q
4	2	Jiang Liyunzhe	China	8.25	Q
5	2	Shing Cho Yan	Hong Kong	8.26	q, PB
6	2	Moumita Mondal	India	8.34	q, PB
7	1	Sara Shams Ali	Qatar	8.37	Q
8	1	Chen Yinfeng	China	8.38	Q
9	1	Yuliya Bashmanova	Kazakhstan	8.43	
10	1	Pragyan Prasant Sahu	India	8.46	PB
11	1	Lau Tsz Yan	Hong Kong	8.57	

Final – 8 February

Rank	Lane	Name	Nationality	Time	Notes
1st place, gold medalist(s)	6	Zhang Po-ya	Chinese Taipei	8.12	NR
2nd place, silver medalist(s)	3	Chisato Kiyoyama	Japan	8.15 (8.142)	PB
3rd place, bronze medalist(s)	5	Hitomi Nakajima	Japan	8.15 (8.147)	=PB
4	8	Shing Cho Yan	Hong Kong	8.22	NR
5	7	Chen Yinfeng	China	8.27	
6	2	Jiang Liyunzhe	China	8.30	
7	4	Sara Shams Ali	Qatar	8.35	
8	1	Moumita Mondal	India	8.40	

=== 4 × 400 metres relay ===
8 February

Rank	Nation	Athletes	Time	Notes
1st place, gold medalist(s)	Kazakhstan	Mariya Shuvalova, Anna Shumilo, Kristina Kondrashova, Adelina Zems	3:38.02	
2nd place, silver medalist(s)	China	Kong Yingying, Li Fengdan, Huang Shiyao, Zuo Siyu	3:38.29	

=== High jump ===
8 February

Rank	Name	Nationality	1.55	1.62	1.69	1.75	1.80	1.84	1.87	1.90	Result	Notes
1st place, gold medalist(s)	Valeriya Gorbatova	Uzbekistan	–	–	o	o	o	o	o	xxx	1.87	PB
2nd place, silver medalist(s)	Nadezhda Dubovitskaya	Kazakhstan	–	–	–	o	o	xxo	o	xxx	1.87	
2nd place, silver medalist(s)	Pooja	India	–	–	–	o	o	xxo	o	xxx	1.87	NR
4	Lu Jiawen	China	–	–	–	o	o	o	xxo	xxx	1.87	
5	Shao Yuqi	China	–	–	–	o	o	o	xxx		1.84	
6	Barnokhon Sayfullayeva	Uzbekistan	–	–	–	xo	o	o	xxx		1.84	
7	Kristina Ovchinnikova	Kazakhstan	–	–	o	o	o	xxx			1.80	
8	Hu Linpeng	China	–	o	o	o	xxx				1.75	
8	Chung Wai Yan	Hong Kong	–	o	o	o	xxx				1.75	
10	Bùi Thị Kim Anh	Vietnam	–	o	o	xo	xxx				1.75	
11	Thị Thảo Dương	Vietnam	–	o	o	xxo	xxx				1.75	

=== Pole vault ===
7 February

Rank	Name	Nationality	3.40	3.60	3.80	3.95	4.10	4.25	4.35	4.45	Result	Notes
1st place, gold medalist(s)	Niu Chunge	China	–	–	–	–	–	o	o	xxx	4.35	
2nd place, silver medalist(s)	Misaki Morota	Japan	–	–	–	o	o	xo	xo	xxx	4.35	
3rd place, bronze medalist(s)	Wei Lingxia	China	–	–	o	o	xo	xxo	xxx		4.25	
4	Polina Ivanova	Kazakhstan	–	o	o	o	o	xxx			4.10	
5	Anna Cherkashina	Kazakhstan	–	o	o	xo	xxx				3.95	
6	Esther Tay	Singapore	o	xxo	xxx						3.60	=NR

=== Long jump ===
8 February

Rank	Name	Nationality	#1	#2	#3	#4	#5	#6	Result	Notes
1st place, gold medalist(s)	Xiong Shiqi	China	6.42	x	6.18	–	–	–	6.42	
2nd place, silver medalist(s)	Li Zhishuang	China	x	x	5.90	6.39	6.29	x	6.39	
3rd place, bronze medalist(s)	Ancy Sojan	India	6.02	x	6.20	x	6.21	x	6.21	
4	Ayaka Kōra	Japan	5.91	5.91	x	6.05	5.96	6.16	6.16	
5	Madushani Herath	Sri Lanka	6.11	x	x	5.90	6.10	x	6.11	NR
6	Moumita Mondal	India	4.14	5.81	5.93	6.01	5.95	5.73	6.01	
7	Tia Louise Rozario	Singapore	5.91	x	x	5.96	5.80	x	5.96	NR
8	Zhu Yi	China	5.89	x	x	x	x	5.51	5.89	
9	Jia Wai Yin	Hong Kong	5.79	x	5.83				5.83	
10	Awutet Amja Vinsensia	Indonesia	5.70	5.76	5.58				5.76	=PB
11	Enkhbat Oyundari	Mongolia	x	5.22	5.60				5.60	
12	Valentina Meredova	Turkmenistan	4.98	5.49	5.40				5.49	
13	Bat-Erdene Suvd-Erdene	Mongolia	x	5.15	x				5.15	PB
14	Lei Chi Kio	Macau	5.08	5.04	4.89				5.08	

=== Triple jump ===
7 February

Rank	Name	Nationality	#1	#2	#3	#4	#5	#6	Result	Notes
1st place, gold medalist(s)	Sharifa Davronova	Uzbekistan	13.48	x	13.75	13.70	14.05	x	14.05	
2nd place, silver medalist(s)	Li Yi	China	x	x	13.49	13.87	x	13.49	13.87	
3rd place, bronze medalist(s)	Mariya Yefremova	Kazakhstan	x	13.68	13.45	13.61	13.54	13.25	13.68	SB
4	Maoko Takashima	Japan	x	13.10	13.40	11.92	13.46	13.10	13.46	
5	Zeng Rui	China	12.37	13.23	x	13.08	–	–	13.23	
6	Chen Jie	China	12.82	13.12	13.12	12.85	x	x	13.12	
7	Madushani Herath	Sri Lanka	12.68	13.07	13.10	12.81	12.69	12.87	13.10	NR
8	Tia Rozario	Singapore	12.78	x	12.91	x	x	12.42	12.91	NR
9	Enkhbat Oyundari	Mongolia	x	x	12.46				12.46	

=== Shot put ===
6 February

Rank	Name	Nationality	#1	#2	#3	#4	#5	#6	Result	Notes
1st place, gold medalist(s)	Song Jiayuan	China	17.77	x	17.91	x	17.86	18.36	18.36	
2nd place, silver medalist(s)	Jiang Yue	China	16.33	16.28	16.87	16.58	16.75	17.11	17.11	
3rd place, bronze medalist(s)	Sun Yue	China	14.93	x	15.75	x	x	15.95	15.95	
4	Yogita	India	14.34	15.33	14.41	x	15.25	14.54	15.33	
5	Dulmaa Bazarsad	Mongolia	12.13	11.43	11.78	x	x	12.22	12.22	NR
6	Lina Hisage	Indonesia	10.50	10.81	11.84	11.33	x	12.07	12.07	=PB

=== Pentathlon ===
6 February

The highest mark recorded in each event is highlighted in yellow

Rank	Athlete	Nationality	60m H	HJ	SP	LJ	800m	Points	Notes
1st place, gold medalist(s)	Alina Chistyakova	Kazakhstan	8.66	1.76	11.15	6.07	2:22.14	4181	
2nd place, silver medalist(s)	Xu Jiahuan	China	8.65	1.73	11.44	5.83	2:22.21	4091	
3rd place, bronze medalist(s)	Wu Zheng	China	8.57	1.70	11.77	6.00	2:32.68	4013	
4	Kozhinjaparambil Aneesh Anamika	India	8.97	1.70	10.74	5.75	2:21.72	3923	
4	Ugiloy Norboyeva	Uzbekistan	8.82	1.73	11.62	5.68	2:29.84	3923	
6	Yuri Tanaka	Japan	8.74	1.55	11.96	5.49	2:19.18	3833	
