= 2015 World Youth Championships in Athletics – Girls' triple jump =

Girls' triple jump at the 2015 World Youth Championships in Athletics
- Venue: Estadio Olímpico Pascual Guerrero
- Dates: 17–18 July
- Competitors: 19 from 14 nations
- Winning distance: 13.49

Medalists
gold medal	Georgiana Iuliana Anitei	Romania
silver medal	Zeng Rui	China
bronze medal	Yanna Armenteros	Cuba

The girls' triple jump at the 2015 World Youth Championships in Athletics was held at the Estadio Olímpico Pascual Guerrero in Cali, Colombia from 17 to 18 July 2015.

== Records ==
Prior to the competition, the following records were as follows.

World Youth Best	Huang Qiuyan (CHN)	14.57	Shanghai, China	19 October 1997
Championship Record	Cristine Spataru (ROU)	13.86	Sherbrooke, Canada	11 July 2003
World Youth Leading	Yanna Armenteros (CUB)	13.49	Havana, Cuba	14 February 2015

== Results ==
=== Qualification ===
With qualifying standard of 12.80 (Q) or at least the 12 best performers (q) advance to the final.

Rank	Group	Name	Nationality	1	2	3	Mark	Notes
1	A	Georgiana Iuliana Anitei	Romania	13.33			13.33	Q
2	B	Ilionis Guillaume	France	12.73	13.11		13.11	Q, PB
3	B	Tara Davis	United States	12.27	x	13.01	13.01	Q, PB
4	B	Yanna Armenteros	Cuba	12.97			12.97	Q
5	A	Fanny Ernestam	Sweden	12.66	12.95		12.95	Q
6	B	Camila Arrieta	Chile	12.92			12.92	Q, PB
7	A	Mariya Ovchinnikova	Kazakhstan	12.83			12.83	Q
7	B	Zeng Rui	China	12.83			12.83	Q
9	A	Alisa Kuznetsova	Russia	x	12.80		12.80	Q
10	A	Norka Moretic	Chile	x	12.33	12.79	12.79	q, PB
11	B	Chiara Bertuzzi	Italy	12.50	12.35	12.77	12.77	q, PB
12	B	Elena Drozhilina	Russia	12.24	12.62	12.75	12.75	q
13	A	Naomi Ogbeta	Great Britain	x	12.35	12.75	12.75	
14	A	LaJarvia Brown	United States	11.82	12.57	12.74	12.74	PB
15	A	Chen Jie	China	12.61	12.48	12.69	12.69	
16	A	Jade De Souza	France	12.60	12.14	12.40	12.60	PB
17	B	Viktoriya Dirdina	Uzbekistan	x	12.52	12.57	12.57	PB
18	B	Sara Sotošek	Slovenia	12.28	x	12.46	12.46	
19	B	Leidy Cuesta	Colombia	12.40	x	12.23	12.40	

=== Final ===
Rank	Name	Nationality	1	2	3	4	5	6	Mark	Notes
1st place, gold medalist(s)	Georgiana Iuliana Anitei	Romania	13.36	x	13.22	13.08	x	13.49	13.49	WYL
2nd place, silver medalist(s)	Zeng Rui	China	12.43	12.98	12.87	13.04	x	12.28	13.04	PB
3rd place, bronze medalist(s)	Yanna Armenteros	Cuba	x	12.36	12.74	13.04	12.53	12.58	13.04	
4	Ilionis Guillaume	France	12.93	x	x	12.68	x	13.02	13.02	
5	Fanny Ernestam	Sweden	x	12.88	12.98	12.90	11.24	12.58	12.98	PB
6	Alisa Kuznetsova	Russia	12.96	12.57	12.72	12.92	x	x	12.96	
7	Mariya Ovchinnikova	Kazakhstan	12.56	12.94	12.75	12.62	12.88	12.81	12.94	
8	Chiara Bertuzzi	Italy	12.52	12.75	12.63	12.33	12.44	12.79	12.79	PB
9	Tara Davis	United States	12.65	x	12.40				12.65	
10	Camila Arrieta	Chile	11.55	12.58	12.32				12.58	
11	Elena Drozhilina	Russia	12.36	12.51	12.47				12.51	
12	Norka Moretic	Chile	x	11.71	12.16				12.16	
