= 2016 IAAF World U20 Championships – Women's triple jump =

The women's triple jump event at the 2016 IAAF World U20 Championships was held at Zdzisław Krzyszkowiak Stadium on 22 and 23 July.

== Medalists ==
Gold	Chen Ting; China
Silver	Konstadina Romeou; Greece
Bronze	Georgiana Iuliana Anitei; Romania

== Records ==
Standing records prior to the 2016 IAAF World U20 Championships in Athletics
World Junior Record	Tereza Marinova (BUL)	14.62	Sydney, Australia	25 August 1996
Championship Record	Tereza Marinova (BUL)	14.62	Sydney, Australia	25 August 1996
World Junior Leading	Davisleidis Velazco (CUB)	14.08	Havana, Cuba	28 May 2016

== Results ==
=== Qualification ===
Qualification: 13.20 (Q) or at least 12 best performers (q) qualified for the final.

Rank	Group	Name	Nationality	#1	#2	#3	Result	Note
1	A	Chen Ting	China	13.77			13.77	Q, PB
2	B	Ilionis Guillaume	France	x	x	13.37	13.37	Q, PB
3	B	Bria Matthews	United States	x	12.89	13.34	13.34	Q
4	A	Yanis David	France	x	x	13.18	13.18	q
5	B	Norka Moretic	Chile	13.10	13.13	13.14	13.14	q
6	A	Davisleidis Velazco	Cuba	13.14	13.01	12.67	13.14	q
7	A	Georgiana Iuliana Anitei	Romania	13.01	x	13.10	13.10	q
8	B	Konstadina Romeou	Greece	12.98	12.97	x	12.98	q
9	B	Mariya Ovchinnikova	Kazakhstan	x	12.84	x	12.84	q
10	B	Alexandra Mihai	Romania	12.77	x	12.61	12.77	q
11	B	Shanique Wright	Jamaica	12.67	x	12.74	12.74	q
12	B	Xu Ting	China	x	12.41	12.69	12.69	q
13	B	Kirthana Ramasamy	Malaysia	12.68	x	12.58	12.68	
14	A	Mariia Sinei	Ukraine	11.98	x	12.53	12.53	
15	A	Anna Gorodkova	Kazakhstan	12.15	12.43	11.77	12.43	
16	A	Diana Zagainova	Lithuania	x	12.19	12.41	12.41	
17	A	Chinne Okoronkwo	United States	x	12.34	x	12.34	
	A	Nhayila Rentería	Colombia	x	x	x	NM	

=== Final ===
Rank	Name	Nationality	#1	#2	#3	#4	Result	Note
1st place, gold medalist(s)	Chen Ting	China	13.67	13.85	11.56	13.41	13.85	PB
2nd place, silver medalist(s)	Konstadina Romeou	Greece	13.55	x	x	x	13.55	PB
3rd place, bronze medalist(s)	Georgiana Iuliana Anitei	Romania	13.00	13.49	13.07w	13.40	13.49	SB
4	Bria Matthews	United States	12.93	13.13	13.21	13.49w	13.49w	
5	Norka Moretic	Chile	13.40	13.23	x	13.22	13.40	NU20R
6	Xu Ting	China	x	13.23	12.96	12.70w	13.23	
7	Alexandra Mihai	Romania	x	x	13.21		13.21	
8	Mariya Ovchinnikova	Kazakhstan	13.17	13.13	12.96		13.17	
9	Ilionis Guillaume	France	12.45	12.99	12.66		12.99	
10	Yanis David	France	11.62	12.97	12.97		12.97	
11	Shanique Wright	Jamaica	x	12.69	12.91		12.91	
12	Davisleidis Velazco	Cuba	12.83	12.73	x		12.83	
