= Athletics at the 2026 Asian Games – Women's triple jump =

Women's triple jump at the 2026 Asian Games
- Venue: Mizuho Park Athletic Stadium, Nagoya
- Date: 24 September 2026
- Competitors: 15 from 12 nations

Medalists
gold medal	Sharifa Davronova	Uzbekistan
silver medal	Huang Yingying	China
bronze medal	Li Yi	China

The women's triple jump competition at the 2026 Asian Games took place on 24 September 2026 at the Mizuho Park Athletic Stadium in Nagoya, Japan. Sharifa Davronova of Uzbekistan retained the Asian Games title with a personal-best jump of 14.35 metres while Huang Yingying and Li Yi of China won the silver and bronze medal respectively.

== Schedule ==
All times are Japan Standard Time (UTC+09:00)

Schedule
Date	Time	Event
Thursday, 24 September 2026	16:14	Final

== Records ==
Prior to this competition, the existing world, Asian and Games records were as follows.

World Record	Yulimar Rojas (VEN)	15.74	Belgrade, Serbia	19 March 2022
Asian Record	Olga Rypakova (KAZ)	15.25	Split, Croatia	4 September 2010
Games Record	Olga Rypakova (KAZ)	14.78	Guangzhou, China	24 November 2010

== Results ==
Rank	Athlete	Attempt						Result	Notes
Rank	Athlete	1	2	3	4	5	6	Result	Notes
1st place, gold medalist(s)	Sharifa Davronova (UZB)	13.90 +0.6	13.85 +1.4	13.56 +1.3	14.31 +0.0	14.35 +0.9	X −0.4	14.35	PB
2nd place, silver medalist(s)	Huang Yingying (CHN)	X −0.4	14.12 +1.9	X +1.2	13.50 +1.0	13.02 +0.8	X −0.4	14.12	=PB
3rd place, bronze medalist(s)	Li Yi (CHN)	13.52 +0.3	13.79 +1.7	13.83 +0.4	13.75 +0.0	X +0.0	13.77 +0.0	13.83	
4	Asha Ilango (IND)	13.43 +0.3	X +1.6	13.83 +1.1	13.63 +0.8	13.65 −0.1	13.59 +2.0	13.83	
5	Maria Natalia Londa (INA)	X +0.6	13.50 +0.3	X +1.8	X −0.3	13.15 +0.1	X +0.2	13.50	SB
6	Akari Funada (JPN)	13.26 +0.5	13.25 +0.8	X +0.5	13.18 +0.8	13.29 +1.1	13.42 +0.3	13.42	
7	Mariya Yefremova (KAZ)	13.34 −0.1	13.07 +0.8	X +0.4	12.91 +0.2	11.62 +0.4	X +1.8	13.34	
8	Nethmika Herath (SRI)	13.20 +0.8	12.95 +0.7	12.74 −0.9	12.60 +0.4	13.12 +1.3	12.73 +0.3	13.20	
9	Vu Thi Ngoc Ha (VIE)	X +0.3	13.13 −1.1	13.09 +0.0				13.13	
10	Niharika Vashisht (IND)	X −0.1	13.00 +0.4	12.60 +0.1				13.00	
11	Tia Rozario (SGP)	12.95 −0.4	X +0.3	X +0.9				12.95	
12	Parinya Chuaimaroeng (THA)	12.91 +0.3	X +1.0	11.44 +0.3				12.91	
13	Maryam Kazemi (IRI)	X +0.2	12.68 +0.2	X +0.0				12.68	
14	Oyundari Enkhbat (MGL)	X +0.2	12.39 −0.2	12.36 +1.1				12.39	
	Nguyen Thi Huong (VIE)	X +0.5	X +0.2	X +1.0				NM	
