= 2025 Asian Athletics Championships – Women's triple jump =

Women's triple jump at the 2025 Asian Athletics Championships
- Venue: Gumi Civic Stadium
- Location: Gumi, South Korea
- Dates: 27 May
- Competitors: 12 from 8 nations
- Winning distance: 13.80 m

Medalists
gold medal	Li Yi	China
silver medal	Sharifa Davronova	Uzbekistan
bronze medal	Mariko Morimoto	Japan

The Women's triple jump event at the 2025 Asian Athletics Championships was held on 27 May.

== Records ==
Records before the 2025 Asian Athletics Championships
Record	Athlete (nation)	Distance (m)	Location	Date
World record	Yulimar Rojas (VEN)	15.74	Belgrade, Serbia	20 March 2022
Asian record	Olga Rypakova (KAZ)	15.25	Split, Croatia	4 September 2010
Championship record	Olga Rypakova (KAZ)	14.69	Amman, Jordan	28 July 2007
World leading	Leyanis Pérez (CUB)	14.93	Nanjing, China	22 March 2025
Asian leading	Xie Yazhan (CHN)	13.90	Jiaxing, China	30 April 2025

== Schedule ==
The event schedule, in local time (UTC+9), was as follows:

Date	Time	Round
27 May	14:45	Final

== Results ==
Place	Athlete	Nation	#1	#2	#3	#4	#5	#6	Result	Notes
1st place, gold medalist(s)	Li Yi	China	13.38 (+0.3 m/s)	13.65 (−0.4 m/s)	x	13.66 (−0.3 m/s)	13.46 (−0.8 m/s)	13.80 (−0.9 m/s)	13.80 m (−0.9 m/s)	
2nd place, silver medalist(s)	Sharifa Davronova	Uzbekistan	x	x	13.49 (−1.5 m/s)	x	13.74 (−1.3 m/s)	13.72 (−1.5 m/s)	13.74 m (−1.3 m/s)	
3rd place, bronze medalist(s)	Mariko Morimoto	Japan	13.31 (+0.2 m/s)	x	x	13.41 (−1.0 m/s)	13.65 (−1.4 m/s)	x	13.65 m (−1.4 m/s)	SB
4	Maoko Takashima	Japan	13.26 (−0.9 m/s)	12.26 (−2.1 m/s)	13.40 (+0.2 m/s)	13.39 (−0.7 m/s)	13.36 (−0.3 m/s)	13.64 (+0.2 m/s)	13.64 m (+0.2 m/s)	SB
5	Nguyễn Thị Hương	Vietnam	13.24 (−2.0 m/s)	13.32 (−0.2 m/s)	13.26 (+0.3 m/s)	x	x	13.59 (±0.0 m/s)	13.59 m (±0.0 m/s)	SB
6	Mariya Ovchinnikova	Kazakhstan	13.30 (−0.8 m/s)	13.36 (−0.5 m/s)	13.10 (+0.8 m/s)	x	13.57 (−0.1 m/s)	x	13.57 m (−0.1 m/s)	
7	Thị Loan Trần	Vietnam	13.18 (+0.2 m/s)	13.20 (−0.8 m/s)	13.17 (−1.1 m/s)	13.41 (−1.9 m/s)	13.17 (−0.1 m/s)	13.08 (−2.1 m/s)	13.41 m (−1.9 m/s)	
8	Roksana Khudoyarova	Uzbekistan	x	12.65 (−1.4 m/s)	x	x	13.32 (−1.7 m/s)	13.34 (−2.0 m/s)	13.34 m (−2.0 m/s)	
9	Parinya Chuaimaroeng	Thailand	x	x	12.41 (+0.3 m/s)				12.41 m (+0.3 m/s)	
10	Lee Hui-jin	South Korea	12.15 (−0.3 m/s)	x	x				12.15 m (−0.3 m/s)	
11	Vera Chan Shannon	Hong Kong	11.69 (−1.5 m/s)	x	12.10 (+0.3 m/s)				12.10 m (+0.3 m/s)	
12	Lee You-jin	South Korea	11.57 (−1.7 m/s)	11.92 (+1.1 m/s)	x				11.92 m (+1.1 m/s)	
