= 2023 Asian Athletics Championships – Women's triple jump =

Women's triple jump at the 2023 Asian Athletics Championships
- Venue: National Stadium
- Location: Bangkok, Thailand
- Dates: 12 July
- Competitors: 9 from 8 nations
- Winning distance: 14.06 m

Medalists
gold medal	Mariko Morimoto	Japan
silver medal	Zeng Rui	China
bronze medal	Nguyễn Thị Hường	Vietnam

The women's triple jump event at the 2023 Asian Athletics Championships was held on 12 July.

== Records ==
Records before the 2023 Asian Athletics Championships
Record	Athlete (nation)	Distance (m)	Location	Date
World record	Yulimar Rojas (VEN)	15.74	Belgrade, Serbia	20 March 2022
Asian record	Olga Rypakova (KAZ)	15.25	Split, Croatia	4 September 2010
Championship record	Olga Rypakova (KAZ)	14.69	Amman, Jordan	28 July 2007
World leading	Yulimar Rojas (VEN)	15.16	San Salvador, El Salvador	5 July 2023
Asian leading	Zeng Rui (CHN)	14.26	Shenyang, China	29 June 2023

== Results ==
Rank	Name	Nationality	#1	#2	#3	#4	#5	#6	Result	Notes
1st place, gold medalist(s)	Mariko Morimoto	Japan	13.66	14.00	13.86	x	x	14.06	14.06	
2nd place, silver medalist(s)	Zeng Rui	China	13.84	x	x	13.97	13.69	14.01	14.01	
3rd place, bronze medalist(s)	Nguyễn Thị Hường	Vietnam	13.12	x	13.4	x	13.57	13.68	13.68	PB
4	Maoko Takashima	Japan	13.24	13.24	13.36	x	13.15	13.63	13.63	
5	Parinya Chuaimaroeng	Thailand	13.58	x	13.09	12.92	13.35	13.21	13.58	
6	Randi Hemasha Cooray	Sri Lanka	12.97	13.17	13.09	12.86	x	12.29	13.17	
7	Khushnoza Shavkatova	Uzbekistan	x	13.05	x	12.67	x	12.48	13.05	
8	Shannon Vera Chan	Hong Kong	12.47	x	11.93	12.46	12.22	x	12.47	
9	Valeriya Safonova	Kazakhstan	x	11.96	x				11.96	
