= Athletics at the 2022 Asian Games – Women's triple jump =

Women's triple jump at the 2022 Asian Games
- Venue: Hangzhou Olympic Expo Main Stadium
- Date: 4 October 2023
- Competitors: 9 from 8 nations

Medalists
gold medal	Sharifa Davronova	Uzbekistan
silver medal	Zeng Rui	China
bronze medal	Mariko Morimoto	Japan

The women's triple jump competition at the 2022 Asian Games took place on 4 October 2023 at the HOC Stadium, Hangzhou.

== Schedule ==
All times are China Standard Time (UTC+08:00)

Date	Time	Event
Wednesday, 4 October 2023	19:10	Final

== Records ==
Prior to this competition, the existing world, Asian and Games records were as follows.

World Record	Yulimar Rojas (VEN)	15.74	Belgrade, Serbia	20 March 2022
Asian Record	Olga Rypakova (KAZ)	15.25	Split, Croatia	4 September 2010
Games Record	Olga Rypakova (KAZ)	14.78	Guangzhou, China	25 November 2010

== Results ==
Rank	Athlete	Attempt						Result	Notes
Rank	Athlete	1	2	3	4	5	6	Result	Notes
1st place, gold medalist(s)	Sharifa Davronova (UZB)	13.98 +0.5	14.09 +0.3	X	X	—	X	14.09	
2nd place, silver medalist(s)	Zeng Rui (CHN)	13.64 +0.4	12.08 +0.6	13.66 +0.4	13.71 −0.5	13.53 −0.2	13.92 −1.2	13.92	
3rd place, bronze medalist(s)	Mariko Morimoto (JPN)	13.35 −0.3	X	X	13.78 −0.8	13.62 −0.6	13.74 −0.9	13.78	
4	Chen Jie (CHN)	12.87 −0.3	X	13.72 +0.2	13.66 +0.2	13.68 −0.6	13.66 +0.2	13.72	
5	Nguyễn Thị Hường (VIE)	13.34 −0.8	13.23 +0.3	13.23 +0.6	13.33 −0.1	13.08 −0.9	13.24 −0.6	13.34	
6	Sheena Varkey (IND)	13.34 −0.1	X	13.04 −0.1	X	X	13.24 −1.5	13.24	
7	Parinya Chuaimaroeng (THA)	X	13.21 −0.4	X	13.22 +0.7	X	X	13.22	
8	Shannon Chan (HKG)	12.49 +0.3	X	12.59 −0.1	12.57 +0.2	12.54 −0.3	X	12.59	
9	Enkhbatyn Oyuundari (MGL)	X	12.19 −0.6	X				12.19	
