= Mariko Morimoto =

Japanese athlete (born 1995)

Personal information
- Born: 17 March 1995 (age 31)

Sport
- Sport: Athletics
- Event: Triple jump

Achievements and titles
- Personal bests: Triple jump: 14.16m (2023) NR
Medal record
Women's athletics
Representing Japan
Asian Games
Bronze medal – third place	2022 Hangzhou	Triple jump
Asian Championships
Gold medal – first place	2023 Bangkok	Triple jump
Bronze medal – third place	2025 Gumi	Triple jump
Asian Indoor Championships
Silver medal – second place	2023 Astana	Triple jump

Mariko Morimoto (born 17 March 1995) is a Japanese triple jumper. She is the Japanese national record holder in the event.

== Early life ==
She is from Osaka. She attended Taisei Gakuin University High School and Japan Women's College of Physical Education. After leaving university she participated in bobsleigh before focusing on athletics.

== Career ==
She won the triple jump at the Japanese Athletics Championships for the first time in 2019. She would go on to win multiple consecutive championships. In winning the 2023 event, she jumped 14.16m, breaking the Japanese national record that had stood for 24 yesrs.

She won the silver medal at the 2023 Asian Indoor Athletics Championships in Astana, Kazakstan.

She won the gold medal at the 2023 Asian Athletics Championships in Bangkok, Thailand in July 2023, winning with her final jump of 14.06 meters. She was named as part of the Japanese team for the 2023 World Athletics Championships in Budapest, Hungary in August 2023, but she did not progress past through the preliminary heats. She won the bronze medal in the triple jump at the delayed 2022 Asian Games held in Hangzhou, China, in October 2023, with a jump of 13.78 metres.

She placed fourth at the 2024 Asian Indoor Athletics Championships in Tehran, Iran. She competed for Japan at the 2024 Olympic Games in Paris, France, but did not progress to the final.

She won the bronze medal in the triple jump at the 2025 Asian Athletics Championships in Gumi, South Korea. In September 2025, she competed at the 2025 World Championships in Tokyo, Japan, without advancing to the final.
