= 2024 World Athletics U20 Championships – Women's triple jump =

Women's triple jump at the 2024 World Athletics U20 Championships
- Venue: Estadio Atlético de la VIDENA
- Dates: 28 August 2024 (qualification); 31 August 2024 (final)
- Competitors: 31 from 24 nations
- Winning distance: 13.75 m

Medalists
gold medal	Sharifa Davronova	Uzbekistan
silver medal	Li Yi	China
bronze medal	Erika Saraceni	Italy

The women's triple jump at the 2024 World Athletics U20 Championships was held at the Estadio Atlético de la VIDENA in Lima, Peru on 28 and 31 August 2024.

== Records ==
U20 standing records prior to the 2024 World Athletics U20 Championships were as follows:

Record	Athlete & Nationality	Mark	Location	Date
World U20 Record	Tereza Marinova (BUL)	14.62	Sydney, Australia	25 August 1996
Championship Record	Tereza Marinova (BUL)	14.62	Sydney, Australia	25 August 1996
World U20 Leading	Li Yi (CHN)	13.99	Bengbu, China	10 May 2024

== Results ==
=== Qualification ===
Athletes attaining a mark of at least 13.30 metres (Q) or at least the 12 best performers (q) qualified for the final.

==== Group A ====
Rank	Athlete	Nation	Round			Mark	Notes
Rank	Athlete	Nation	1	2	3	Mark	Notes
1	Li Yi	China	13.38			13.38	Q
2	Erika Saraceni	Italy	13.29	12.95		13.29	q
3	Sharifa Davronova	Uzbekistan	12.98	13.24		13.24	q
4	Asia Phillips	Canada	12.91	13.20		13.20	q
5	Clémence Rougier	France	13.10	12.48	12.52	13.10	q
6	Josie Krone	Germany	12.74	12.36	13.09	13.09	q
7	Teodora Boberić	Serbia	x	13.04	12.93	13.04	q
8	Olga Szlachta	Poland	x	13.04	x	13.04 w	q
9	Brenda Apsīte	Latvia	x	12.63	12.82	12.82	
10	Alyona Chass	Ukraine	x	12.57	12.81	12.81	
11	Natalija Dragojević	Serbia	x	12.72	12.59	12.72	
12	Anna Panenko	Estonia	x	12.62	x	12.62	
13	Jaeda Robinson	Jamaica	x	12.27	12.53	12.53	
14	Madushani Herath	Sri Lanka	12.23	11.64	11.79	12.23	
15	Ariday Girón	Cuba	x	11.94	12.21	12.21	
16	Melina Zaragka	Greece	x	x	12.18	12.18	

==== Group B ====
Rank	Athlete	Nation	Round			Mark	Notes
Rank	Athlete	Nation	1	2	3	Mark	Notes
1	Masha-Sol Gelitz	Germany	12.88	12.90	13.06	13.06 w	q
2	Adriana Krūzmane	Latvia	12.95	12.47	x	12.95	q, PB
3	Tiana Boras	Australia	12.26	12.39	12.84	12.84	q
4	Jade-Ann Dawkins	Jamaica	x	12.64	12.82	12.82	q
5	Khushnoza Shavkatova	Uzbekistan	12.79	x	12.64	12.79	
6	Daria Vrînceanu	Romania	x	12.34	12.75	12.75	
7	Aurėja Beniušytė	Lithuania	12.72	x	12.58	12.72	
8	Elisa Valenti	Italy	12.55	11.68	12.64	12.64	
9	Valery Arce	Colombia	12.50	12.38	x	12.50	
10	Elda Romeva Riba	Spain	12.33	12.22	12.39	12.39	
11	Zoi Rapti	Greece	12.32	x	11.99	12.32	
12	Sylvana Behile	Ecuador	12.11	12.26	11.69	12.26	
13	Amelia Pinga	Mozambique	11.43	11.85	12.00	12.00	
14	Ma'kala Davis	United States	11.96	11.57	11.77	11.96	
15	Nicole Torrejon	Peru	x	x	11.54	11.54	PB

=== Final ===
Rank	Athlete	Nation	Round						Mark	Notes
Rank	Athlete	Nation	1	2	3	4	5	6	Mark	Notes
1st place, gold medalist(s)	Sharifa Davronova	Uzbekistan	x	13.56	x	x	13.64	13.75	13.75	
2nd place, silver medalist(s)	Li Yi	China	13.54	13.55	13.53	13.46	13.25	13.03	13.55	
3rd place, bronze medalist(s)	Erika Saraceni	Italy	13.28	13.45	x	13.43	11.63	13.47	13.47	PB
4	Asia Phillips	Canada	12.97	12.74	13.25	13.22	13.01	13.31	13.31	
5	Masha-Sol Gelitz	Germany	12.77	12.93	13.17	12.86	12.74	12.92	13.17	PB
6	Olga Szlachta	Poland	x	13.16	13.08	x	13.14	x	13.16	
7	Josie Krone	Germany	x	12.60	13.14	12.91	13.05	12.91	13.14	
8	Clémence Rougier	France	13.11	12.96	12.95	13.11	x	x	13.11	
9	Teodora Boberić	Serbia	13.02	x	12.73				13.02	
10	Jade-Ann Dawkins	Jamaica	12.91	x	12.61				12.91	
11	Adriana Krūzmane	Latvia	12.80	x	12.41				12.80	
12	Tiana Boras	Australia	12.54	x	x				12.54	
