= 2017 Asian Athletics Championships – Women's triple jump =

The women's triple jump at the 2017 Asian Athletics Championships was held on 8 July.

== Results ==
Rank	Name	Nationality	#1	#2	#3	#4	#5	#6	Result	Notes
1st place, gold medalist(s)	Mariya Ovchinnikova	Kazakhstan	13.36	13.51	x	13.53	13.72	x	13.72	
2nd place, silver medalist(s)	Irina Ektova	Kazakhstan	x	13.31	13.35	13.30	13.62	13.53	13.62	
3rd place, bronze medalist(s)	N.V. Sheena	India	13.07	x	12.99	11.40	13.20	13.42	13.42	
4	Vidusha Lakshani	Sri Lanka	13.12	x	13.17	13.30	13.33	x	13.33	
5	Kaede Miyasaka	Japan	x	12.68	13.22	13.32	12.82	13.25	13.32	
6	Rao Fan	China	12.70	13.00	12.98	13.06	13.20	13.02	13.20	
7	Joyline Mural Lobo	India	12.57	x	12.71	x	x	12.51	12.71	
8	Sachiko Masumi	Japan	x	12.59	x	x	x	x	12.59	
9	Park Min-hee	South Korea	12.51	x	12.57				12.57	
10	Noor Shahidatun Nadia	Malaysia	x	x	12.39				12.39	
	Keshari Chaudhari	Nepal							DNS	

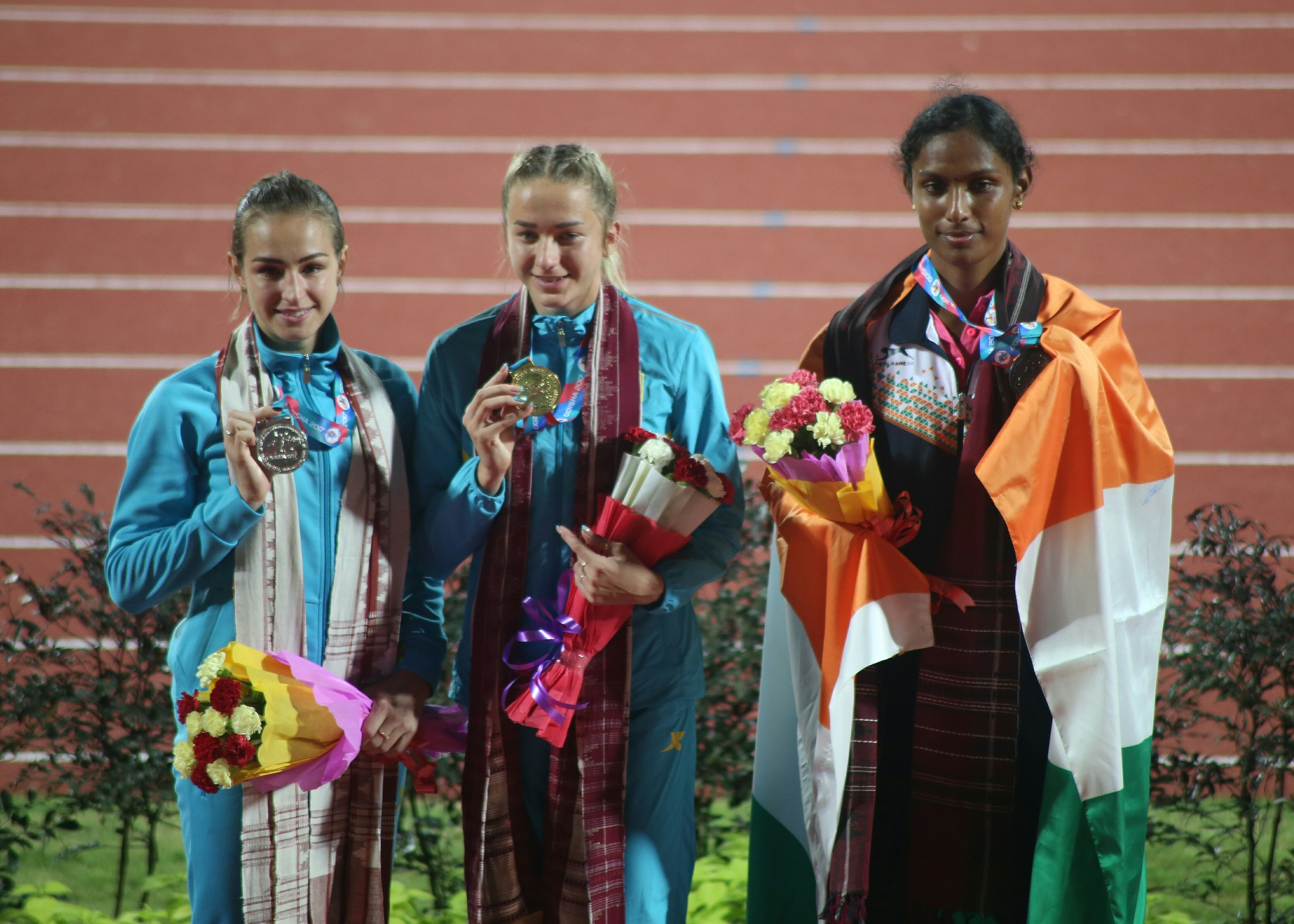
The medallists
