= Linda Suchá =

Czech triple jump (born 2001)

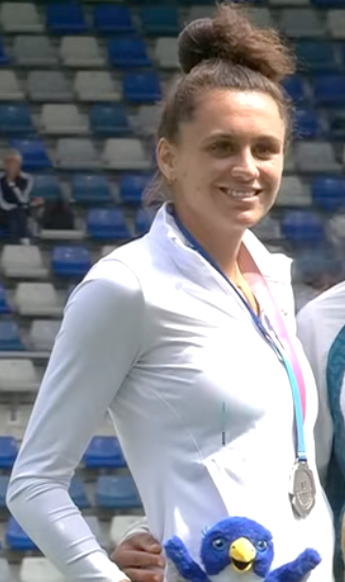
- Suchá at the 2025 World University Games

Personal information
- Born: 28 September 2001 (age 24) Plzeň, Czech Republic

Sport
- Sport: Athletics
- Event: Triple jump

Achievements and titles
- Personal best: Triple jump: 14.03m (2025)
Medal record
Women's athletics
Representing Czech
Summer World University Games
Silver medal – second place	2025 Bochum	Triple jump

Linda Suchá (born 28 September 2001) is a Czech triple jumper and long jumper. She won the triple jump at the Czech Athletics Championships in 2025 and the silver medal in the triple jump at the 2025 Summer World University Games.

== Life ==
Linda Suchá was born on 28 September 2001 in Plzeň. She studied teaching at the University of West Bohemia.

== Career ==
She is a member of Škoda Plzeň athletics club in Plzeň. She won both the triple jump and long jump at the Czech Junior Championships in September 2020 in Vítkovice. She qualified for the final and placed seventh overall in the triple jump at the 2023 European Athletics U23 Championships in Espoo, Finland.

In January 2025, she won the women's triple jump at the Otrokovice Jump 2025, part of the World Athletics Indoor Tour Challenger, clinching victory with a jump of 13.71m, an indoor best. In March 2025, she competed in the triple jump at the 2025 European Athletics Indoor Championships in Apeldoorn, Netherlands, her senior major championship debut. She competed in the Czech team at the 2025 European Athletics Team Championships First Division in Madrid, Spain, placing sixth overall in the triple jump.

She won the silver medal in the triple jump at the 2025 Summer World University Games in Bochum, Germany, in July 2025 finishing behind Sharifa Davronova. She set a new personal best of 14.03 metres the following month as she won the Czech Athletics Championships. She competed at the 2025 World Athletics Championships in Tokyo, Japan, jumping 13.72 metres without advancing to the final.

Suchá won both the long jump and the triple jump at the 2026 Czech Indoor Athletics Championships in Ostrava. In August 2026, she competed at the 2026 European Athletics Championships in Birmingham, England.
