= 2015 World Youth Championships in Athletics – Girls' long jump =

Girls' long jump at the 2015 World Youth Championships in Athletics
- Venue: Estadio Olímpico Pascual Guerrero
- Dates: 18–19 July
- Competitors: 19 from 18 nations
- Winning distance: 6.41

Medalists
gold medal	Tara Davis	United States
silver medal	Kaiza Karlén	Sweden
bronze medal	Maja Bedrač	Slovenia

The girls' long jump at the 2015 World Youth Championships in Athletics was held at the Estadio Olímpico Pascual Guerrero in Cali, Colombia from 18 to 19 July 2015.

== Records ==
Prior to the competition, the following records were as follows.

World Youth Best	Heike Drechsler (GDR)	6.91	Jena, East Germany	9 August 1981
Championship Record	Darya Klishina (RUS)	6.47	Ostrava, Czech Republic	15 July 2007
World Youth Leading	Lisa Maihöfer (GER)	6.42	Ulm, Germany	10 May 2015

== Results ==
=== Qualification ===
With qualifying standard of 6.10 (Q) or at least the 12 best performers (q) advance to the final.

Rank	Group	Name	Nationality	1	2	3	Mark	Notes
1	B	Viyaleta Skvartsova	Belarus	5.82	6.26		6.26	Q, PB
2	A	Tara Davis	United States	6.24			6.24	Q
3	A	Milica Gardašević	Serbia	5.92	6.16		6.16	Q
4	A	Maja Bedrač	Slovenia	3.61	6.16		6.16	Q
5	B	Susana Hernández	Mexico	5.81	6.11		6.11	Q
6	A	Disneyis Taureaux	Cuba	5.89	5.73	6.07	6.07	q
7	B	Maya Takeuchi	Japan	5.88	5.58	6.07	6.07	q
8	B	Georgiana Iuliana Anitei	Romania	5.85	x	6.02	6.02	q
9	A	Tabea Christ	Germany	5.99	5.86	5.92	5.99	q
10	B	Emily Wright	Great Britain	x	5.81	5.94	5.94	q
11	B	Kaiza Karlén	Sweden	5.69	5.86	5.92	5.92	q
12	B	Gaja Wota	Poland	x	x	5.90	5.90	q
13	A	Kanae Sugimura	Japan	5.81	5.64	5.88	5.88	
14	A	Tissanna Hickling	Jamaica	x	5.85	x	5.85	
15	A	Renate van Tonder	South Africa	5.81	5.68	x	5.81	
16	B	Ecem Çalağan	Turkey	5.61	5.54	5.80	5.80	
17	A	Andrea Thompson	Australia	5.68	5.71	4.57	5.71	SB
18	B	Eleni Koutsaliari	Greece	5.62	5.48	5.61	5.62	
19	A	Laura Zuleta	Colombia	5.16	5.12	5.25	5.25	PB

=== Final ===
Rank	Name	Nationality	1	2	3	4	5	6	Mark	Notes
1st place, gold medalist(s)	Tara Davis	United States	6.19	6.21	x	x	6.24	6.41	6.41	PB
2nd place, silver medalist(s)	Kaiza Karlén	Sweden	5.45	6.24	5.90	5.83	5.99	5.98	6.24	PB
3rd place, bronze medalist(s)	Maja Bedrač	Slovenia	4.46	6.09	x	5.97	6.13	6.22	6.22	
4	Emily Wright	Great Britain	6.21	6.15	5.96	6.00	5.75	5.96	6.21	PB
5	Susana Hernández	Mexico	5.98	6.21	x	6.02	6.07	6.04	6.21	
6	Milica Gardašević	Serbia	5.85	x	6.10	x	6.20	x	6.20	
7	Viyaleta Skvartsova	Belarus	6.11	6.19	6.02	5.85	5.97	5.95	6.19	
8	Disneyis Taureaux	Cuba	6.03	6.06	x	x	5.96	5.99	6.06	
9	Georgiana Iuliana Anitei	Romania	5.82	5.89	6.04				6.04	
10	Gaja Wota	Poland	x	5.91	5.73				5.91	
11	Maya Takeuchi	Japan	5.71	5.81	5.89				5.89	
12	Tabea Christ	Germany	5.36	x	5.79				5.79	
