= 2019 Asian Athletics Championships – Women's triple jump =

Women's triple jump at the 2019 Asian Athletics Championships
- Venue: Khalifa International Stadium
- Location: Doha, Qatar
- Dates: 23 April
- Competitors: 10 from 9 nations
- Winning distance: 13.72 m

Medalists
gold medal	Parinya Chuaimaroeng	Thailand
silver medal	Zeng Rui	China
bronze medal	Vidusha Lakshani	Sri Lanka

The women's triple jump at the 2019 Asian Athletics Championships was held on 23 April.

== Records ==
Records before the 2019 Asian Athletics Championships
Record	Athlete (nation)	Distance (m)	Location	Date
World record	Inessa Kravets (UKR)	15.50	Gothenburg, Sweden	10 August 1995
Asian record	Olga Rypakova (KAZ)	15.25	Split, Croatia	4 September 2010
Championship record	Olga Rypakova (KAZ)	14.69	Amman, Jordan	28 July 2007
World leading	Yulimar Rojas (VEN)	14.92	Madrid, Spain	8 February 2019
Asian leading	Chen Shuiqing (CHN)	13.39	Nanjing, China	24 February 2019

== Results ==
Rank	Name	Nationality	#1	#2	#3	#4	#5	#6	Result	Notes
1st place, gold medalist(s)	Parinya Chuaimaroeng	Thailand	13.59	13.45	x	x	13.55	13.72	13.72	SB
2nd place, silver medalist(s)	Zeng Rui	China	13.56	13.28w	13.41	13.65	13.41	13.58	13.65	
3rd place, bronze medalist(s)	Vidusha Lakshani	Sri Lanka	13.40w	x	13.46w	13.53	x	x	13.53	SB
4	Irina Ektova	Kazakhstan	x	13.08	12.97	x	13.40	13.03	13.40	SB
5	Kirthana Ramasamy	Malaysia	11.84	13.14	13.33	x	13.01	13.11	13.33	SB
6	Vũ Thị Mến	Vietnam	13.22	13.19w	13.22	12.97	12.54	13.14	13.22	SB
7	Bae Chan-mi	South Korea	13.02	13.07	x	x	x	x	13.07	
8	Kaede Miyasaka	Japan	x	12.71	12.58	11.99	12.91	12.95	12.95	
9	Chen Ting	China	x	x	12.68				12.68	SB
10	Roksana Khudoyarova	Uzbekistan	12.45	12.63	x				12.63	
	Bashir Al-Manwari	Qatar							DNS	
	Olga Rypakova	Kazakhstan							DNS	
