= Athletics at the 2025 Summer World University Games – Women's triple jump =

Women's triple jump at the 2025 Summer World University Games
- Venue: Lohrheidestadion
- Location: Bochum, Germany
- Dates: 26 July (qualification); 27 July (final)
- Competitors: 24 from 20 nations
- Winning distance: 14.33 m

Medalists
gold medal	Sharifa Davronova	Uzbekistan
silver medal	Linda Suchá	Czech Republic
bronze medal	Desleigh Owusu	Australia

The women's triple jump event at the 2025 Summer World University Games was held in Bochum, Germany, at Lohrheidestadion on 25 and 27 July.

== Records ==
Prior to the competition, the records were as follows:

Record	Athlete (nation)	Distance (m)	Location	Date
Games record	Ekaterina Koneva (RUS)	14.82 m	Kazan, Russia	11 July 2013

== Results ==
=== Qualification ===
All athletes over 13.90 m (Q) or at least the 12 best performers (q) advance to the final.

==== Group A ====
Place	Athlete	Nation	#1	#2	#3	Result	Notes
1	Sharifa Davronova	Uzbekistan	13.67 (−0.2 m/s)	x	r	13.67 m (−0.2 m/s)	q
2	Desleigh Owusu	Australia	x	13.54 (−0.4 m/s)	-	13.54 m (−0.4 m/s)	q
3	Regiclécia Cândido	Brazil	13.35 (+0.2 m/s)	13.49 (+0.2 m/s)	x	13.49 m (+0.2 m/s)	q
4	Iuliana Dabija	Moldova	12.29 (+0.6 m/s)	12.95 (+0.3 m/s)	13.42 (+0.8 m/s)	13.42 m (+0.8 m/s)	q, PB
5	Magdalena Perić	Croatia	x	x	12.98 (−2.8 m/s)	12.98 m (−2.8 m/s)	q
6	Georgina Forde-Wells	Great Britain	x	x	12.88 (−2.1 m/s)	12.88 m (−2.1 m/s)	
6	Alyona Chass	Ukraine	x	x	12.88 (−1.9 m/s)	12.88 m (−1.9 m/s)	
8	Yana Sargsyan	Armenia	12.44 (+0.7 m/s)	12.87 (−0.6 m/s)	x	12.87 m (−0.6 m/s)	
9	Sawant Poorva	India	12.40 (+0.1 m/s)	x	12.82 (−1.3 m/s)	12.82 m (−1.3 m/s)	
10	Gizem Akgöz	Turkey	12.78 (−0.1 m/s)	x	12.51 (+0.8 m/s)	12.78 m (−0.1 m/s)	
11	Eliise Anijalg	Estonia	11.90 (+0.9 m/s)	12.36 (−0.1 m/s)	12.55 (+0.7 m/s)	12.55 m (+0.7 m/s)	
—	Kaja Kleppe Salemonsen	Norway	x	x	x	NM	

==== Group B ====
Place	Athlete	Nation	#1	#2	#3	Result	Notes
1	Linda Suchá	Czech Republic	13.80 (+0.2 m/s)	13.77 (−1.7 m/s)	r	13.80 m (+0.2 m/s)	q
2	Sarah-Michelle Kudla	Germany	13.67 (−0.1 m/s)	11.70 (−0.8 m/s)	r	13.67 m (−0.1 m/s)	q
3	Ilona Masson	Belgium	x	13.47 (+0.2 m/s)	x	13.47 m (+0.2 m/s)	q
4	Rachela Pace	Malta	x	13.25 (−0.1 m/s)	12.82 (−1.9 m/s)	13.25 m (−0.1 m/s)	q
5	Wiktorija Baraniwska	Ukraine	x	13.08 (−2.2 m/s)	x	13.08 m (−2.2 m/s)	q
6	Emilia Sjöstrand	Sweden	x	13.06 m (−0.9 m/s)	x	13.06 m (−0.9 m/s)	q
7	Nurul Ashikin	Malaysia	x	x	12.98 (+0.5 m/s)	12.98 m (+0.5 m/s)	q, SB
8	Erna Virók	Hungary	12.26 (+0.1 m/s)	12.28 (+0.2 m/s)	12.50 (−0.4 m/s)	12.50 m (−0.4 m/s)	
9	L.S.W Arachchi	Sri Lanka	x	12.08 (−0.3 m/s)	12.20 (+1.3 m/s)	12.20 m (+1.3 m/s)	
10	Kathrine Holst Hahn	Denmark	x	x	12.17 (−1.9 m/s)	12.17 m (−1.9 m/s)	
11	Sandra Babu	India	x	11.98 (−2.3 m/s)	x	11.98 m (−2.3 m/s)	
12	Amtul Rehman	Pakistan	x	x	11.56 (−0.7 m/s)	11.56 m (−0.7 m/s)	

=== Final ===
Place	Athlete	Nation	#1	#2	#3	#4	#5	#6	Result	Notes
1st place, gold medalist(s)	Sharifa Davronova	Uzbekistan	x	14.33 (+1.2 m/s)	13.96 (+0.5 m/s)	x	-	13.83 (+1.4 m/s)	14.33 m (+1.2 m/s)	PB
2nd place, silver medalist(s)	Linda Suchá	Czech Republic	13.61 (+0.6 m/s)	13.82 (+0.8 m/s)	13.74 (+0.1 m/s)	13.51 (+0.1 m/s)	13.89 (+0.7 m/s)	13.54 (+0.3 m/s)	13.89 m (+0.7 m/s)	PB
3rd place, bronze medalist(s)	Desleigh Owusu	Australia	x	13.76 (+0.8 m/s)	13.86 (+0.9 m/s)	x	x	x	13.86 m (+0.9 m/s)	PB
4	Ilona Masson	Belgium	13.41 (−0.8 m/s)	x	13.73 (+1.1 m/s)	13.17 (−0.3 m/s)	13.67 (+0.5 m/s)	x	13.73 m (+1.1 m/s)	
5	Sarah-Michelle Kudla	Germany	13.50 (−0.3 m/s)	x	x	11.77 (+0.5 m/s)	12.84 (−0.1 m/s)	13.36 (+0.9 m/s)	13.50 m (−0.3 m/s)	
6	Emilia Sjöstrand	Sweden	13.34 (+0.6 m/s)	13.42 (+1.1 m/s)	x	x	x	x	13.42 m (+1.1 m/s)	
7	Regiclécia Cândido	Brazil	13.40 (−0.1 m/s)	x	13.33 (+0.3 m/s)	13.36 (+1.0 m/s)	x		13.40 m (−0.1 m/s)	
8	Iuliana Dabija	Moldova	x	13.02 (−0.1 m/s)	12.78 (+0.4 m/s)	13.16 (+0.9 m/s)	12.74 (+0.2 m/s)	x	13.16 m (+0.9 m/s)	
9	Wiktorija Baraniwska	Ukraine	x	x	12.94 (+0.2 m/s)				12.94 m (+0.2 m/s)	
10	Magdalena Perić	Croatia	12.92 (+1.0 m/s)	x	x				12.92 m (+1.0 m/s)	
11	Rachela Pace	Malta	11.69 (+0.3 m/s)	12.91 (+0.2 m/s)	12.81 (+0.3 m/s)				12.91 m (+0.2 m/s)	
12	Nurul Ashikin	Malaysia	12.27 (+0.2 m/s)	x	12.70 (+1.2 m/s)				12.70 m (+1.2 m/s)	
