= Sharifa Davronova =

Uzbeki athlete (born 2006)

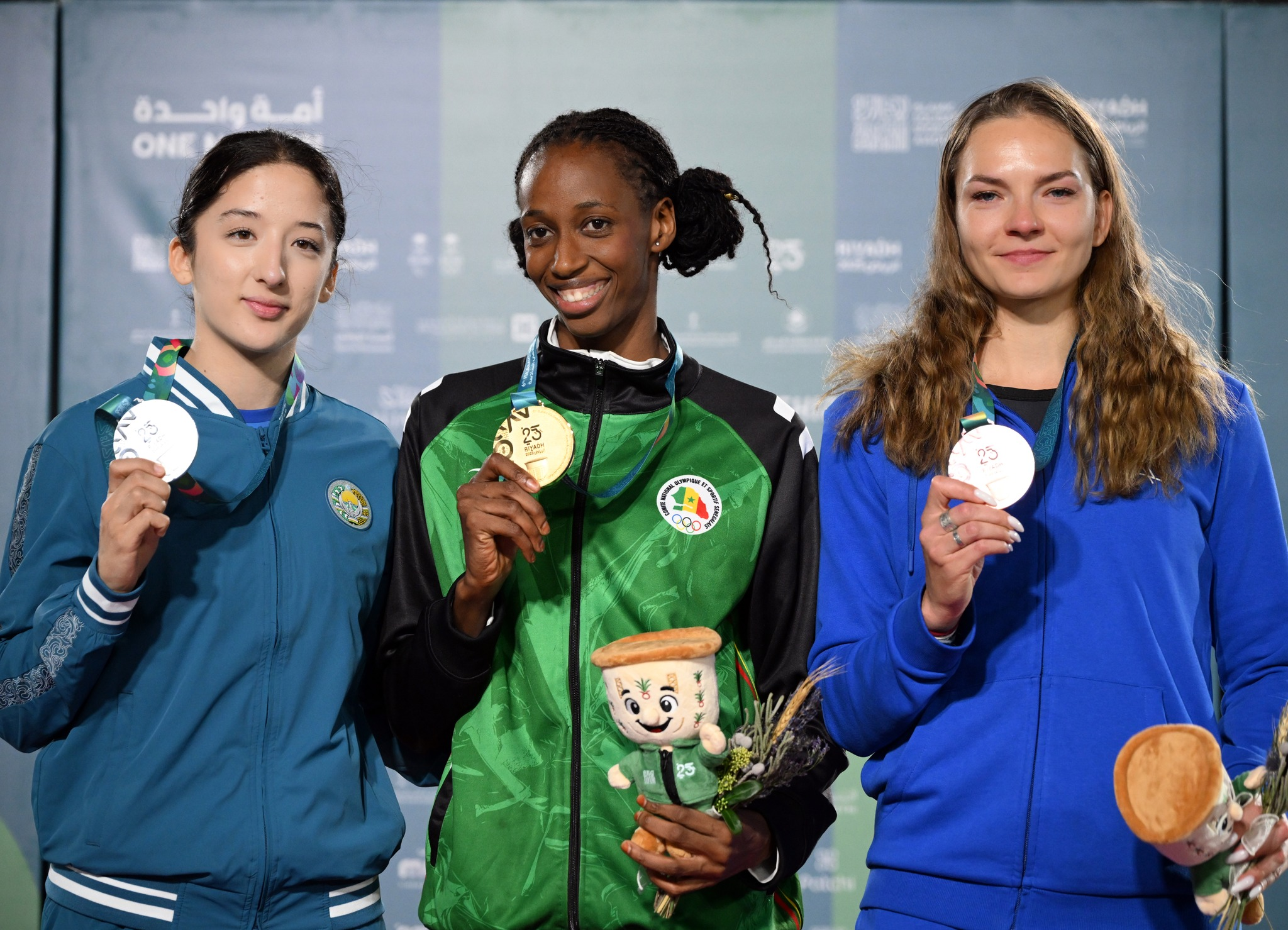
- Davronova in 2025

Personal information
- Nationality: Uzbekistan
- Born: 27 September 2006 (age 19) Samarkand, Uzbekistan

Sport
- Sport: Track and Field
- Event: Triple Jump

Achievements and titles
- Personal best: 14.35
Medal record
Women's athletics
Representing Uzbekistan
Asian Games
Gold medal – first place	2022 Hangzhou	Triple jump
Gold medal – first place	2026 Aichi-Nagoya	Triple jump
Asian Championships
Silver medal – second place	2025 Gumi	Triple jump
Asian Indoor Championships
Gold medal – first place	2023 Astana	Triple jump
Gold medal – first place	2026 Tianjin	Triple jump
World U20 Championships
Gold medal – first place	2022 Cali	Triple Jump
Gold medal – first place	2024 Lima	Triple Jump
Islamic Solidarity Games
Gold medal – first place	2021 Konya	Triple Jump
Silver medal – second place	2025 Riyadh	Triple jump
World University Games
Gold medal – first place	2025 Bochum	Triple jump
Asian U18 Championships
Gold medal – first place	2023 Tashkent	Triple jump
Silver medal – second place	2023 Tashkent	Long jump

Sharifa Davronova (born 27 September 2006) is an Uzbek track and field athlete specializing in the triple jump. She is a member of the Uzbekistan national athletics team. She has won multiple national championships in Uzbekistan and has also been the champion of the Uzbekistan Cup. Additionally, she has secured victory at the World U20 Athletics Championships and the Asian U18 Athletics Championships. In 2022, she claimed a gold medal at the Islamic Solidarity Games, and in 2023, she won the Asian Indoor Athletics Championships and the Summer Asian Games, retaining the title at the 2026 Asian Games.

== Biography ==
Starting in 2020, Sharifa began participating in major national competitions. In that year, she won the Uzbekistan Championship and the Uzbekistan Cup, as well as the Uzbekistan Junior Championship in the 100-meter dash and the triple jump. Since 2021, she has been taking part in international competitions as a member of the Uzbekistan national team. In that year, at the "Memorial Gusman Kosanov" competition in Almaty, Kazakhstan, she clinched a gold medal with a result of 13.01 meters. Towards the end of the year, in international competitions for junior athletes born in 2004, held in Nur-Sultan, Kazakhstan, she secured gold medals in the 60-meter dash and the triple jump.

=== 2022 ===
In 2022, she started the year with victories at the Uzbekistan Championship and the Uzbekistan Cup. In May of the same year, at the "Olimpik Deneme Yarışmaları" international competition in Bursa, Turkey, she won gold medals in the 100-meter dash and the triple jump. However, at the "Memorial Gusman Kosanov" competition in Almaty, Kazakhstan, she placed third with a result of 13.80 meters. At the U20 World Athletics Championship in Cali, Colombia, she won a gold medal with a result of 14.04 meters.

In August 2022, at the 5th Islamic Solidarity Games in Konya, Turkey, she secured a gold medal with a result of 14.30 meters. In the autumn of the same year, she became the champion at the Central Asian Open Championships and then emerged victorious at the U18 Asian Championships in the long jump and triple jump.

=== 2023 ===
In 2023, at the Asian Indoor Athletics Championship in Astana, Kazakhstan, she won a gold medal in the triple jump with a result of 13.98 meters. On March 7, 2023, for her sporting achievements, Sharifa Davronova was awarded the "Kelajak bunyodkori" medal by the President of Uzbekistan. In the same year, she made her debut at the World Athletics Championship in Budapest, Hungary, where she finished 24th with a result of 13.66 meters. Recognizing her success in sports, the Asian Athletics Association named Sharifa Davronova the "Best Young Female Athlete of the Year".

On October 4, 2023, at the Summer Asian Games in Hangzhou, China, she won a gold medal in the triple jump with a result of 14.09 meters. In the same year Asian Athletics Championships U18 in Tashkent, Uzbekistan, she took first place in the triple jump program with a score of 13.99 m.

=== 2024 ===
She competed in the triple jump at the 2024 Paris Olympics. In August 2024, she retained her world U20 title at the 2024 World Athletics U20 Championships in Lima, Peru, ahead of Yi Li of China and Italian Erika Saraceni.

=== 2025 ===
She jumped 13.74 metres and won the silver medal at the 2025 Asian Athletics Championships in Gumi, South Korea behind Yi Li. In September 2025, she competed at the 2025 World Championships in Tokyo, Japan.

=== 2026 ===
In February 2026, she won the gold medal in the triple jump at the 2026 Asian Indoor Athletics Championships in Tianjin, China, with a jump of 14.05 metres. In March, she placed tenth overall at the 2026 World Athletics Indoor Championships in Toruń, Poland.

Competing as a freshman for the University of Oregon in May 2026, she set a meeting record to win the Big Ten Championships with 14.13 m with her first and only jump of her first competition for the Oregon Ducks. She subsequently qualified for the 2026 NCAA Outdoor Championships. In July, she won the gold medal at the inaugural Asian U23 Championships with a jump of 14.24m. In September, she defended her triple jump title at the 2026 Asian Games in Nagoya, Japan, taking the lead with a fifth-round jump of 14.31m before extending her lead to 14.35m with her final round jump.

== Personal life ==
Davronova was born in Samarkand. Her mother is Nasiba Hoshimova. She is coached by Muzaffar Karimov and has been training in athletics since she was 10 years old.

== International competitions ==
Year	Competition	Venue	Position	Event	Notes
Representing Uzbekistan
2022	World U20 Championships	Cali, Colombia	1st	Triple jump	14.04 m
2022	Islamic Solidarity Games	Konya, Turkey	1st	Triple jump	14.30 m (w)
2022	Asian U18 Championships	Kuwait City, Kuwait	1st	Long jump	6.06 m
2022	Asian U18 Championships	Kuwait City, Kuwait	1st	Triple jump	13.23 m
2023	Asian Indoor Championships	Astana, Kazakhstan	1st	Triple jump	13.98 m
2023	Asian U18 Championships	Tashkent, Uzbekistan	2nd	Long jump	6.22 m
2023	Asian U18 Championships	Tashkent, Uzbekistan	1st	Triple jump	13.99 m
2023	World Championships	Budapest, Hungary	24th (q)	Triple jump	13.66 m
2023	Asian Games	Hangzhou, China	7th	Long jump	6.14 m
2023	Asian Games	Hangzhou, China	1st	Triple jump	14.09 m
2024	Olympic Games	Paris, France	23rd (q)	Triple jump	13.74 m
2024	World U20 Championships	Lima, Peru	1st	Triple jump	13.75 m
2025	World Indoor Championships	Nanjing, China	12th	Triple jump	13.44 m
2025	Asian Championships	Gumi, South Korea	19th (q)	Long jump	5.26 m
2025	Asian Championships	Gumi, South Korea	2nd	Triple jump	13.74 m
2025	World University Games	Bochum, Germany	1st	Triple jump	14.33 m
2025	World Championships	Tokyo, Japan	18th (q)	Triple jump	13.79 m
2025	Islamic Solidarity Games	Riyadh, Saudi Arabia	4th	Long jump	6.04 m
2025	Islamic Solidarity Games	Riyadh, Saudi Arabia	2nd	Triple jump	13.91 m
2026	Asian Indoor Championships	Tianjin, China	1st	Triple jump	14.05 m
2026	World Indoor Championships	Toruń, Poland	10th	Triple jump	13.81 m
2026	Asian U23 Championships	Ordos, China	1st	Triple jump	14.24 m
