= Desleigh Owusu =

Australian triple jump (born 2001)

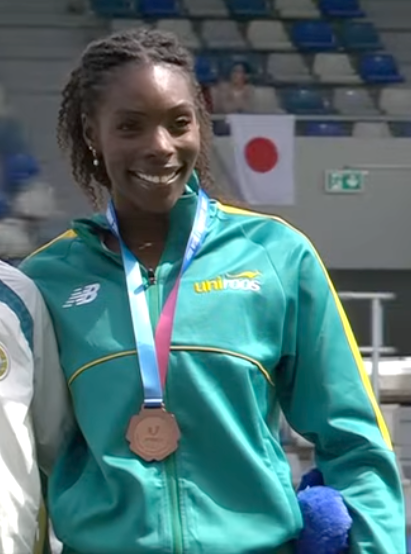
- At the 2025 World University Games

Personal information
- Nationality: Australian
- Born: 20 September 2001 (age 24)

Sport
- Sport: Athletics
- Event: Triple jump

Achievements and titles
- Personal bests: Triple jump: 13.86m (Bochum, 2025)
Medal record
Women's athletics
Representing Australia
Oceania Championships
Gold medal – first place	2026 Darwin	Triple jump
Gold medal – first place	2024 Suva	Triple jump
Silver medal – second place	2022 Mackay	Triple jump
Pacific Games
Gold medal – first place	2023 Honiara	Triple jump
Summer World University Games
Bronze medal – third place	2025 Bochum	Triple jump

Desleigh Owusu (born 20 September 2001) is an Australian triple jumper. She is a multiple-time national champion and the gold medal winner at the 2024 and 2026 Oceania Athletics Championships. In 2025, she became the first Australian woman to compete in the triple jump at the World Championships.

== Biography ==
She began competing in athletics for Werrington Athletics Club in Sydney. She became New South Wales state champion at 16 years—old. As an 18-year-old, Owusu recorded Australia’s fourth longest women’s triple jump at the 2019 under-20 Oceania Championships where she jumped 13.42 metres. She is coached by Australian triple jumper Andrew Murphy.

She won her first national title at the 2023 Australian Athletics Championships in Brisbane and went on to represent Australia at the delayed 2021 Summer World University Games in Chengdu, China, placing sixth overall.

She won the gold medal at the 2024 Oceania Athletics Championships in Suva, Fiji in June 2024 with a jump of 13.45 metres. That year, she retained her national title at the 2024 Australian Athletics Championships in Adelaide.

She won the Australian Athletics Championships for a third time in April 2025 in Perth. She was selected for the 2025 Summer World University Games in Germany, winning the bronze medal in the women's triple jump with a personal best jump of 13.86 metres (+0.9), she had also previously broken her personal best earlier in the competition.

In September 2025, she competed at the 2025 World Championships in Tokyo, Japan, without advancing to the final. She was the first Australian woman to compete in the triple jump at the event.

On 10 April 2026, she won her fourth straight triple jump title at the Australian Championships in Sydney, with a leap of 13.58m (+0.4) to finish ahead of Tiana Boras. The following month, Owusu also won the gold medal at the 2026 Oceania Athletics Championships in Darwin. She placed fourth in the triple jump at the 2026 Commonwealth Games in Glasgow, Scotland.

== Personal life ==
She grew up the western Sydney suburb of Blacktown and attended Blacktown Girls High School. She graduated with a bachelor's degree in social science from Macquarie University in 2025. She has Ghanaian heritage.
