= 2022 World Athletics U20 Championships – Women's triple jump =

Women's triple jump at the 2022 World Athletics U20 Championships
- Venue: Estadio Olímpico Pascual Guerrero
- Dates: 5 August (qualification); 6 August (final)
- Competitors: 29 from 20 nations
- Winning distance: 14.04

Medalists
gold medal	Sharifa Davronova	Uzbekistan
silver medal	Sohane Aucargos	France
bronze medal	Tiana Boras	Australia

The women's triple jump at the 2022 World Athletics U20 Championships was held at the Estadio Olímpico Pascual Guerrero on 5 and 6 August.

33 athletes from 22 countries were entered to the competition, however 29 athletes from 20 countries were on the final entry list.

== Records ==
U20 standing records prior to the 2022 World Athletics U20 Championships were as follows:

Record	Athlete & Nationality	Mark	Location	Date
World U20 Record	Tereza Marinova (BUL)	14.62	Sydney, Australia	25 August 1996
Championship Record	Tereza Marinova (BUL)	14.62	Sydney, Australia	25 August 1996
World U20 Leading	Sharifa Davronova (UZB)	14.53	Tashkent, Uzbekistan	28 May 2022

== Results ==
=== Qualification ===
The qualification round took place on 5 August, in two groups, Group A started at 09:07 and Group B at 10:47. Athletes attaining a mark of at least 13.15 metres ( Q ) or at least the 12 best performers ( q ) qualified for the final.

Rank	Group	Name	Nationality	Round			Mark	Notes
Rank	Group	Name	Nationality	1	2	3	Mark	Notes
1	B	Anna Gräfin Keyserlingk	Germany	13.24			13.24	Q
2	A	Sharifa Davronova	Uzbekistan	13.24			13.24	Q
3	B	Iuliana Dabija	Moldova	13.11	13.04	13.21	13.21	Q, PB
4	A	Sohane Aucargos	France	x	13.18		13.18	Q
5	A	Tiana Boras	Australia	x	13.14	13.08	13.14	q, PB
6	B	Fernanda Maita	Venezuela	13.11	12.88	-	13.11	q
7	A	Anna Kłosińska	Poland	12.83	12.68	13.11	13.11	q
8	B	Agur Dwol	United States	13.09	12.85	12.88	13.09	q, PB
9	A	Machaeda Linton	Jamaica	12.88	13.04	13.06	13.06	q, PB
10	B	Sotiria Rapti	Greece	12.99	12.84	x	12.99	q
11	A	Ruth Hildebrand	Germany	12.76	12.99	12.80	12.99	q
12	A	Wissal Harkas	Algeria	12.31	x	12.95	12.95	q
13	B	Valery Arce	Colombia	x	12.94	12.78	12.94	
14	B	Ioana Emilia Colibasanu	Romania	12.48	x	12.92	12.92	
15	B	Mariana de Oliveira	Brazil	12.85	12.71	12.77	12.85	
16	B	Estrella Lobo	Colombia	x	x	12.84	12.84	
17	A	Alba Cuns	Spain	12.74	12.70	x	12.74	
18	B	Anna Rugowska	Poland	12.44	12.35	12.74	12.74	
19	B	Winny Chepngetich Bii	Kenya	11.41	12.69	12.47	12.69	
20	B	Anna Panenko	Estonia	x	x	12.67	12.67	
21	A	Jennifer-Stefania Dossey	Romania	12.45	12.62	x	12.62	
22	A	Ana Paula Arguello	Paraguay	11.42	x	12.59	12.59	
23	A	Teodora Boberić	Serbia	x	12.44	12.54	12.54	
24	B	Jana Dragutinović	Serbia	12.50	x	x	12.50	
25	A	Suzan Ogunleye	United States	x	12.35	12.35	12.35	
26	A	Mairy Pires	Venezuela	x	11.75	12.30	12.30	
27	A	Leann Nicholas	Saint Vincent and the Grenadines	11.84	12.08	-	12.08	
28	B	Khushnoza Shavkatova	Uzbekistan	x	12.04	12.05	12.05	
	B	Clémence Rougier	France	DNS				

=== Final ===
The final was started at 15:52 on 6 August.

Rank	Name	Nationality	Round						Mark	Notes
Rank	Name	Nationality	1	2	3	4	5	6	Mark	Notes
1st place, gold medalist(s)	Sharifa Davronova	Uzbekistan	x	14.04	x	13.15	–	–	14.04	WU20L
2nd place, silver medalist(s)	Sohane Aucargos	France	13.38	x	x	13.35	12.96	x	13.38	
3rd place, bronze medalist(s)	Tiana Boras	Australia	13.30	13.13	x	x	x	13.01	13.30	PB
4	Fernanda Maita	Venezuela	12.79	13.06	12.89	11.49	13.30	12.26	13.30	PB
5	Anna Gräfin Keyserlingk	Germany	12.87	13.07	13.26	11.24	13.12	x	13.26	
6	Ruth Hildebrand	Germany	12.59	12.98	13.21	11.36	12.87	x	13.21	PB
7	Iuliana Dabija	Moldova	12.98	13.08	12.99	12.93	13.11	12.96	13.11	
8	Sotiria Rapti	Greece	x	12.81	13.00	12.95	12.94	12.78	13.00	
9	Machaeda Linton	Jamaica	12.31	12.86	12.61				12.86	
10	Wissal Harkas	Algeria	12.72	x	x				12.72	
11	Anna Kłosińska	Poland	x	12.69	12.55				12.69	
12	Agur Dwol	United States	12.60	12.63	12.60				12.63	
