= Shao Yuqi =

Chinese athlete (born 2002)

Personal information
- Born: 13 May 2002 (age 24)

Sport
- Sport: Athletics
- Event: High jump

Achievements and titles
- Personal best: High jump: 1.90m (2024)
Medal record
Women's athletics
Representing China
Asian Indoor Championships
Silver medal – second place	2024 Tehran	High jump

Shao Yuqi (born 13 May 2002) is a Chinese high jumper. She won the silver medal at the 2024 Asian Indoor Championships and is a two-time Chinese national champion.

== Biography ==
Having been introduced to the high jump while at primary school, she is based the Hubei provincial track and field team based in central China. At the 2021 Chinese Athletics Championships, she won the high jump in June 2021 in Shaoxing, with a jump of 1.84 metres. She cleared the same height to win the National Games Trials, later that month in Chongqing, ahead of Lu Jiawen.

In February 2023, she placed sixth at the 2026 Asian Indoor Championships in Kazakhstan.

In February 2024, she won the silver medal at the 2024 Asian Indoor Championships in Tehran, Iran with a jump of 1.86 metres.

At the 2025 Chinese Athletics Championships on 1 August, she won the high jump in Quzhou, with an equal personal best jump of 1.90 metres. In November 2025, she won the high jump competition at the 15th National Games in Guangzhou.

In February 2026, she placed fifth at the 2026 Asian Indoor Championships in Tianjin. In April, she finished in joint-second in the high jump at the 6th Asian Beach Games with a clearance of 1.83 meters.

== Personal life ==
From 2020 she attended Tsinghua University. She has a large following on Chinese social media platform Douyin.
