= Deng Xinrui =

Chinese sprinter (born 2003)

Personal information
- Native name: Chinese: 邓信锐
- Nationality: China
- Born: 20 December 2003 (22 years, 227 days old) Guangzhou, China
- Home town: Guangxi, China
- Education: Jinan University

Sport
- Sport: Athletics
- Events: 60 metres 100 metres
- Coached by: Mo Youxue

Achievements and titles
- National finals: 2023 Chinese Indoors; • 60m, 3rd (bronze); 2023 Chinese Champs; • 100m, 1st (gold)
- Personal bests: 60m: 6.56 (2026) 100m: 10.06 (+0.2) (2025)
Medal record
Men's athletics
Representing China
Asian Indoor Championships
Gold medal – first place	2026 Tianjin	60 m
- Updated on 13 February 2026

Deng Xinrui (Note: In this Chinese name, the family name is Deng.) (Chinese: 邓信锐; born 20 December 2003) is a Chinese sprinter. He won the 100 metres at the 2023 Chinese Athletics Championships.

== Career ==
By the end of 2021, Deng's 100 metres best was just 10.87 seconds. Coached by Mo Youxue, he improved rapidly and won his first professional competition in the 60 metres at the 3rd Indoor Invitational Meeting in Sichuan Xipu Training Base in Chengdu. His running style has been compared to Su Bingtian. He improved his 100 m time gradually to 10.21 seconds during the 2023 outdoor season.

At the 2023 Chinese Athletics Championships, Deng won all three rounds of the 100 m. In the finals, he ran just 0.02 seconds off his personal best despite significant rainfall.

== Personal life ==
Deng was born in Guangzhou and had participated in sprinting as early as elementary school, driven by his parents' desire to improve his poor health. Deng completed his freshman year at Jinan University majoring in physical education in 2023. In late 2022, he began representing the Guangxi regional team in Chinese competition.

Since high school, Deng has changed his WeChat name to reflect his time goals in the 100 metres, originally with a goal of "1050" for 10.50 seconds. In 2023, he changed it to "1025" and later "1010" after he ran 10.21 seconds.

== Statistics ==
100m progression
#	Mark	Pl.	Competition	Venue	Date	Ref.
1	10.68 (−0.2 m/s)	(gold) (Heat 3)	Guangdong Ersha Center Athletics Permit Meeting	Guangzhou, China	28 Sep 2022	
2	10.66 (−1.4 m/s)	1st place, gold medalist(s)	Guangdong Ersha Center Athletics Permit Meeting	Guangzhou, China	28 Sep 2022	
3	10.61 (+0.2 m/s)	(gold) (Heat 7)	Regional Southwest China Invitational Meeting	Chengdu, China	6 Apr 2023	
4	10.49 (−0.1 m/s)	(gold) (Heat 2)	Chinese Grand Prix	Taizhou, Zhejiang, China	25 May 2023	
5	10.42 (+0.2 m/s)	(gold) (Heat 1)	Chinese Grand Prix	Huangshi, China	8 Jun 2023	
6	10.21 (+0.5 m/s)	(gold) (Semifinal 1)	Chinese Grand Prix	Huangshi, China	8 Jun 2023	
