= Yogita =

Yogita or Yogeeta is a given name. Notable people with the name include:

- Yogeeta Bali (born 1952), Indian former actress
- Yogita Bali (born 1987), Indian hockey player
- Yogita Bihani, Indian actress
