= Kitty Xu Ting =

Chinese actress and blogger

Xu Ting
- Born: 3 October 1990
- Died: 7 September 2016 (aged 25)

Xu Ting (Chinese: 徐婷; 3 October 1990 – 7 September 2016), known as Kitty Xu Ting, was a Chinese actress and blogger who died of cancer in 2016. Previously known for her appearances in Dad Home and Lost in Macau, she was a popular blogger on the microblogging website Sina Weibo with 300,000 followers. Her death received widespread press attention for her refusal to use modern medical treatments such as chemotherapy, in favor of Chinese traditional remedies.

She was diagnosed with lymphoma, and prescribed chemotherapy treatment, which she declined to take for reasons of cost, and fear of the pain involved. Instead, she chose traditional Chinese treatments such as acupuncture, cupping, gua sha and jiu sha. Her condition worsened, and although she finally chose to take a course of chemotherapy, it was too late for the treatment to be effective, and she died on 7 September.

Her death has caused much discussion within China about the relationship between and appropriateness of traditional Chinese and modern medical treatments, particularly on the social media site Sina Weibo, on which she had blogged about the progress of her disease.
