= Andrew George Medina =

Singaporean athlete (born 2002)

Personal information
- Born: 22 March 2002 Singapore

Sport
- Country: Singapore
- Sport: Athletics
- Events: Long jump, Triple jump
Medal record
Men's Athletics
Representing Singapore
Southeast Asian Games
Bronze medal – third place	2025 Thailand	Long jump

Andrew George Medina is a Singapore athlete specialising in jumps. At the 2025 SEA Games in Thailand, he won a bronze in the long jump.
