= Lu Jiawen =

Chinese athlete (born 2002)

Personal information
- Born: 19 August 2002 (age 23)

Sport
- Sport: Athletics
- Event: High jump

Achievements and titles
- Personal best: High jump: 1.92m (2021)
Medal record
Women's athletics
Representing China
Asian Indoor Championships
Bronze medal – third place	2024 Tehran	High jump
Asian Youth Championships
Gold medal – first place	2019 Hong Kong	High jump

Lu Jiawen (born 19 August 2002) is a Chinese high jumper. She won the silver medal at the 2024 Asian Indoor Championships and is a two-time Chinese indoor national champion. She represented China at the 2022 World Athletics Championships.

== Biography ==
From Shanghai, in March 2019, Lu won the gold medal at the 2019 Asian Youth Athletics Championships with a championship record clearance of 1.83 metres. That year, she represented China in Doha at the senior Asian Athletics Championships, placing fourth overall high jump competition.

In June 2021, she placed second at the Chinese National Games Trials, in Chongqing, behind Shao Yuqi. In September 2021, she jumped a personal best 1.92 metres to win the Chinese National Games, increasing her personal best by 2 cm. The following year, she represented China in the high jump at the 2022 World Athletics Championships in Eugene, in the United States.

Competing in Bangkok, she placed tied-fourth at the 2023 Asian Athletics Championships high jump competition. In February 2024, she won the bronze medal at the 2024 Asian Indoor Championships in Tehran, Iran with a jump of 1.83 metres. In March, she won the high jump at the 2024 Chinese Indoor Championships in Tianjin.

At the 2025 Chinese Athletics Championships, she placed second in the high jump in August 2025 in Quzhou, with a jump of 1.90 metres, finishing behind Shao Yuqi on count-back.

In February 2026, she placed fourth at the 2026 Asian Indoor Championships in Tianjin. In March, she won the high jump at the 2026 Chinese Indoor Championships in Jinan. In May, she placed seventh with a jump of 1.88 metres at the 2026 Xiamen Diamond League.
