= Sun Yue (shot putter) =

Chinese shot putter (born 2001)

Personal information
- Born: 19 June 2001 (age 25)

Sport
- Sport: Athletics
- Event: Shot put

Achievements and titles
- Personal best(s): Shot put: 18.24m (Tianjin, 2023)
Medal record
Women's athletics
Representing China
Asian Indoor Championships
Gold medal – first place	2024 Tehran	Shot put
Bronze medal – third place	2026 Tianjin	Shot put
World Youth Championships
Bronze medal – third place	2017 Nairobi	Shot put

Sun Yue (born 19 June 2001) is a Chinese shot putter. She competed at the 2024 Olympic Games and 2025 World Championships. She won the gold medal at the 2024 Asian Indoor Athletics Championships and the bronze at the 2026 Asian Indoor Athletics Championships.

== Career ==
Competing at the 2017 IAAF World U18 Championships in Nairobi, she won the bronze medal in the shot put.

In February 2024, she won the gold medal in the shot put at the 2024 Asian Indoor Athletics Championships in Tehran, Iran with a throw of 17.65 metres. In August 2024, she represented China at the 2024 Olympic Games, without qualifying for the final.

In March 2025, she won the gold medal at the Chinese Indoor Athletics Championships. She represented China at the 2025 Summer World University Games in Bochum, Germany, placing fifth overall. Competing at the 2025 World Athletics Championships in Tokyo, Japan, in September 2025, where her best distance was 17.46 metres, without advancing to the final.

In February 2026, she won the bronze medal in the shot put at the 2026 Asian Indoor Athletics Championships in Tianjin, China.
