= Vidusha Lakshani =

Sri Lankan athletics competitor

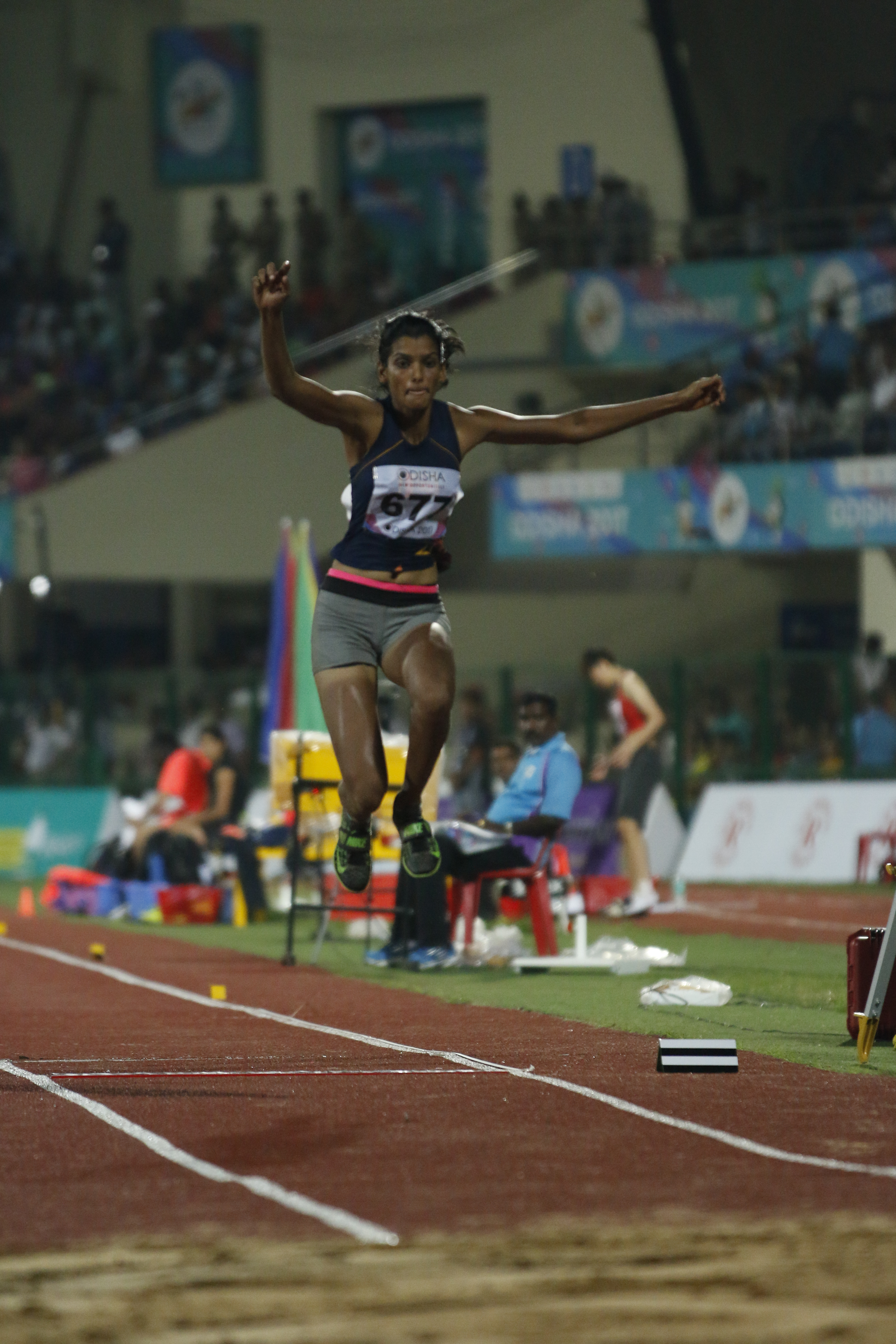
- Lakshani at the 2017 Asian Athletics Championships

Personal information
- Full name: Heenatimullage Dona Vidusha Lakshani
- Born: 28 December 1996 (age 29) Negombo, Sri Lanka
- Education: Newstead Girls School Negombo

Sport
- Events: Triple jump, Long jump
- Club: SL Army
Medal record
Women's athletics
Representing Sri Lanka
South Asian Games
Silver medal – second place	2016 Guwahati	Triple jump
Silver medal – second place	2019 Kathmandu	Triple jump
Asian Championships
Bronze medal – third place	2019 Doha	Triple jump

Heenatimullage Dona Vidusha Lakshani (born 28 December 1996), known as H. D. Vidusha Lakshani or simply Vidusha Lakshani, is a Sri Lankan athlete specialising in the triple jump.

She was born 28 December 1996 in Negombo, Western Province. She attended Newstead Girls College.

In 2018, she became the national triple jump champion with a jump of 13.64m. She has also medalled in the 2016 South Asian Games and other events. As of 1 January 2019, she was ranked 60th in the world in women's triple jump, and had earlier held 41st place for one week.

She won bronze medal in the Asian Athletics Championships 2019 held in Doha, Qatar, and dedicated the medal to the memory of friends and teachers who had died in the attack at St Sebastian's Church, Negombo, in the 2019 Sri Lanka Easter bombings.
