= Tiana Boras =

Australian triple jump (born 2005)

Personal information
- Nationality: Australian
- Born: 4 March 2005 (age 21)

Sport
- Sport: Athletics
- Event: Triple jump

Achievements and titles
- Personal best(s): Triple jump: 13.30m (Cali, 2022)
Medal record
Women's athletics
Representing Australia
Oceania Championships
Bronze medal – third place	2024 Suva	Triple jump
Bronze medal – third place	2026 Darwin	Triple jump
World U20 Championships
Bronze medal – third place	2022 Cali	Triple Jump

Tiana Boras (born 4 March 2005) is an Australian triple jumper. She was the bronze medalist at the 2022 IAAF World Junior Championships and won the bronze medal at the 2024 and 2026 Oceania Athletics Championships.

== Biography ==
A student at the Victorian Institute of Sport and a member of Athletics Chilwell, Boras is coached by 2006 Commonwealth Games medallist Alwyn Jones.

As a 17-year-old, Boras broke the Australian and Oceania U18 triple jump record when she won the bronze medal representing Australia in the triple jump at the 2022 World Athletics U20 Championships in Cali, Colombia with a jump of 13.30 metres (-0.1), just 6 cm short of the Australian U20 record. She had previously set a new personal best of 13.14 metres to qualify for the final.

Boras was named Athletics Australia's Female Junior Athlete of the Year. However, Boras was unable to compete for over a year after the championships due to injury. Having returned from injury, Boras won the bronze medal at the 2024 Oceania Athletics Championships in Suva, Fiji in June 2024 with a jump of 12.89 metres. She was a finalist in the triple jump at the 2024 World Athletics U20 Championships in Lima, Peru, placing twelfth overall having jumped 12.84 metres in qualifying and 12.54 metres in the final.

Boras was runner-up to Desleigh Owusu at the 2026 Australian Championships in Sydney. She was selected as part of the Australian team to compete at the 2026 Oceania Athletics Championships in Darwin, Northern Territory and equalled her personal best to win the bronze medal with 13.30 metres.

== Personal life ==
Boras was born and raised in Geelong, and resided in Manifold Heights. She is of Croatian descent.
