= Erika Saraceni =

Italian athlete (born 2006)

Personal information
- Nationality: Italian
- Born: Erika Giorgia Anoeta Saraceni; 21 May 2006 (age 20) Milan

Sport
- Sport: Athletics
- Event: Triple jump

Achievements and titles
- Personal bests: Triple jump: 14.50m (Birmingham, 2026)
Medal record
Women's athletics
Representing Italy
World U20 Championships
Bronze medal – third place	2024 Lima	Triple jump
European U20 Championships
Gold medal – first place	2025 Tampere	Triple jump
Mediterranean Games
Gold medal – first place	2026 Taranto	Triple jump

Erika Giorgia Anoeta Saraceni (born 21 May 2006) is an Italian triple jumper. She won the bronze medal at the 2024 World Athletics U20 Championships and became Italian national indoor champion at the Italian Indoor Athletics Championships in 2025 and the outdoor champion at the Italian Athletics Championships in 2026.

== Career ==
Saraceni finished fourth in the triple jump at both the 2022 European Athletics U18 Championships, in Jerusalem, Israel, and the 2023 European Athletics U20 Championships, also held in Jerusalem, Israel.

Saraceni won gold in the triple jump at the 2023 European Youth Summer Olympic Festival in Maribor, Slovenia in July 2023 with an Italian U18 record performance of 13.42 metres, breaking the previous record held since 2012 by Ottavia Cestonaro. Saraceni had led the competition, was overtaken by Polish athlete Olga Szlachta with one jump remaining, then reclaimed the lead with her final jump. She was given the honour of being among the flag-bearers for Italy at the conclusion of the Games. She was named Italian young female athlete of the year in December 2023 by the Italian Athletics Federation.

Saraceni won the bronze medal at the 2024 World Athletics U20 Championships in Lima, Peru in August 2024. To do so, she increased her personal best twice, first with 13.45 metres with her second jump, and then with 13.47 metres in the last of her six jumps.

Saraceni won the triple jump competition at the Italian Indoor Athletics Championships in Ancona in February 2025, achieving a new personal best distance of 13.71 metres. In May 2025 Saraceni set a new Italian junior record with a jump of 14.01 meters. A new personal best jump of 14.08 metres allowed her to finish third in the triple jump at the 2025 European Athletics Team Championships First Division in Madrid on 28 June 2025.

At the 2025 European Athletics U20 Championships in Tampere, Finland, Saraceni reached the final with the best jump in qualification of 14.00 metres, ahead of any other athlete by 66 centimetres. In the first round of the final she jumped 14.08 metres to take the lead and finished the competition with a personal best leap of 14.24m (0.0) in the final round, also 12 cm beyond the championship best previously set by Anastasiya Ilyina.

In September 2025, Saraceni competed at the 2025 World Championships in Tokyo, Japan, without advancing to the final. In September 2025, she was nominated for the European Athletics female rising star award, alongside compatriot Kelly Doualla.

After the 2025 outdoor season, Saraceni had surgery to repair a sports hernia injury, which caused her to miss the 2026 indoor season. In July 2026, she made a season debut at the senior Italian Championships, winning with a new personal best of 14.41m for victory in her first competition since the 2025 World Athletics Championships. On 10 August while competing at the 2026 European Athletics Championships in Birmingham, England, Saraceni jumped a personal best of 14.50 metres to lead the qualifiers for the triple jump final, before placing twelfth overall.

== Personal life ==
Saraceni is from Milan and is a member of Gruppo Sportivo Fiamme Azzurre. She is the daughter of athlete Enrico Saraceni who predominantly competes over 400 metres.
