= 2024 Asian Indoor Athletics Championships =

2024 Asian Indoor Championships
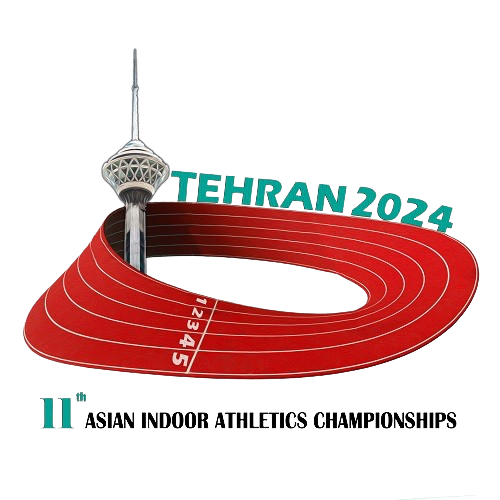
- Dates: 17–19 February
- Host city: Tehran, Iran
- Venue: Aftab e Enghelab Sports Complex
- Events: 26
- Participation: 256 athletes from 26 nations

The 2024 Asian Indoor Athletics Championships was the eleventh edition of the international indoor athletics event among Asian nations which was held in Tehran, Iran from 17 to 19 February 2024.

Tehran, Iran previously hosted the 1st (2004), 4th (2010) and 8th (2018) editions.

== Medalists ==
=== Men ===
Event	Gold		Silver		Bronze	
60 metres	Ali Anwar Al-Balushi (OMA)	6.52	Shuhei Tada (JPN)	6.56	Jo Kum Ryong (PRK)	6.66
400 metres	Sajad Aghaei (IRI)	47.95	Mohammad Jahir Rayhan (BAN)	48.10 NR	Yasir Ali Al-Saadi (IRQ)	48.40
800 metres	Ebrahim Al-Zofairi (KUW)	1:46.80 CR	Sobhan Ahmadi (IRI)	1:47.04	Abubaker Haydar Abdalla (QAT)	1:47.74
1500 metres	Nursultan Keneshbekov (KGZ)	3:49.10 NR	Abdirahman Saeed Hassan (QAT)	3:49.31	Ali Amirian (IRI)	3:49.33
3000 metres	Nursultan Keneshbekov (KGZ)	8:08.85	Amir Zamanpour (IRI)	8:09.58	Maxim Frolovskiy (KAZ)	8:17.17
60 metres hurdles	David Yefremov (KAZ)	7.60 =CR	Qin Weibo (CHN)	7.63	John Cabang (PHI)	7.64 NR
4 × 400 metres relay	Kazakhstan; Andrey Sokolov; Elnur Mukhitdinov; Vyacheslav Zems; Yefim Tarassov	3:12.05	Iraq; Taha Hussein Yaseen; Ihab Jabbar Hashim; Mohammed Abdulridha al-Tameemi; Yasir Ali al-Saadi	3:12.09 NR	Iran; Arash Sayyari; Mir Mohammad Taleei; Mohammad Sajjad Aghaei; Ali Amirian	3:13.96
High jump	Ryoichi Akamatsu (JPN)	2.19	Yuto Seko (JPN)	2.19	Mahfuzur Rahman (BAN); Ma Jia (CHN)	2.15NR; 2.15
Pole vault	Zhong Tao (CHN)	5.65	Song Haoyang (CHN)	5.60	Hussain Al-Hizam (KSA)	5.55
Long jump	Zhang Mingkun (CHN)	7.97	Yuto Toriumi (JPN)	7.89	Daiki Oda (JPN)	7.76
Triple jump	Su Wen (CHN)	16.74	Kim Jangwoo (KOR)	16.37	Ivan Denisov (UZB)	16.18
Shot put	Tajinderpal Singh Toor (IND)	19.72 NR	Ivan Ivanov (KAZ)	19.08	Mehdi Saberi (IRI)	18.74
Heptathlon	Yuma Maruyama (JPN)	5767	Zakhiriddin Shokirov (UZB)	5353	Amir Mehdi Hanifeh (IRI)	5124

=== Women ===
Event	Gold		Silver		Bronze	
60 metres	Farzaneh Fasihi (IRI)	7.20 =CR, NR	Olga Safronova (KAZ)	7.35	Supanich Poolkerd (THA)	7.38
400 metres	Nanako Matsumoto (JPN)	55.14	Nazanin Fatemeh Eidian (IRI)	55.33	Kazhan Rostami (IRI)	55.35
800 metres	Toktam Dastarbandan (IRI)	2:09.17 NR	Negin Azari Edalat (IRI)	2:11.43	Akbayan Nurmamet (KAZ)	2:13.10
1500 metres	Harmilan Bains (IND)	4:29.55	Ainuska Kalil Kyzy (KGZ)	4:35.29	Aiana Bolatbekkyzy (KAZ)	4:37.20
3000 metres	Yuma Yamamoto (JPN)	9:16.71	Ankita Dhyani (IND)	9:26.22	Ainuska Kalil Kyzy (KGZ)	9:27.18
60 metres hurdles	Jyothi Yarraji (IND)	8.12 NR	Asuka Terada (JPN)	8.21	Lui Lai Yiu (HKG)	8.26 NR
4 × 400 metres relay	Kazakhstan; Adelina Zems; Anna Shumilo; Mariya Shuvalova; Kristina Kondrashova	3:41.08	Iran; Kazhan Rostami; Shahla Mahmoudi; Maryam Mohebi; Nazanin Fatemeh	3:41.72 NR	Uzbekistan; Laylo Allaberganova; Lidiya Podsepkina; Nurxon Ochilova; Ogiloy Norboyeva	4:12.43
High jump	Yelizaveta Matveyeva (KAZ)	1.86	Shao Yuqi (CHN)	1.86	Lu Jiawen (CHN)	1.83
Pole vault	Li Ling (CHN)	4.51	Niu Chunge (CHN)	4.41	Mahsa Mirzatabibi (IRI)	4.10
Long jump	Xiong Shiqi (CHN)	6.55	Tan Mengyi (CHN)	6.50	Yue Nga Yan (HKG)	6.45 NR
Triple jump	Chen Jie (CHN)	13.63	Zeng Rui (CHN)	13.61	Mariya Yefremova (KAZ)	13.48
Shot put	Sun Yue (CHN)	17.65	Malika Nasreddinova (UZB)	15.42	Elham Hashemi (IRI)	14.27
Pentathlon	Zheng Ninali (CHN)	4130	Fatemeh Mohitizadeh (IRI)	3970	Alina Chistyakova (KAZ)	3818

== Medal table ==
* Host nation (Iran)

Rank	Nation	Gold	Silver	Bronze	Total
1	China (CHN)	8	6	2	16
2	Japan (JPN)	4	4	1	9
3	Kazakhstan (KAZ)	4	2	5	11
4	Iran (IRI)*	3	6	7	16
5	India (IND)	3	1	0	4
6	Kyrgyzstan (KGZ)	2	1	1	4
7	Kuwait (KUW)	1	0	0	1
7	Oman (OMA)	1	0	0	1
9	Uzbekistan (UZB)	0	2	2	4
10	Bangladesh (BAN)	0	1	1	2
10	Iraq (IRQ)	0	1	1	2
10	Qatar (QAT)	0	1	1	2
13	South Korea (KOR)	0	1	0	1
14	Hong Kong (HKG)	0	0	2	2
15	North Korea (PRK)	0	0	1	1
15	Philippines (PHI)	0	0	1	1
15	Saudi Arabia (KSA)	0	0	1	1
15	Thailand (THA)	0	0	1	1
Totals (18 entries)		26	26	27	79

== Participating nations ==
- Afghanistan (5)
- Bangladesh (5)
- China (14)
- Hong Kong (14)
- India (13)
- Iran (79)
- Iraq (11)
- Japan (14)
- Kazakhstan (30)
- Kuwait (6)
- Kyrgyzstan (5)
- Lebanon (1)
- Macau (5)
- Maldives (2)
- North Korea (1)
- Oman (3)
- Pakistan (3)
- Philippines (2)
- Qatar (7)
- Saudi Arabia (8)
- Singapore (1)
- South Korea (3)
- Tajikistan (4)
- Thailand (4)
- Turkmenistan (5)
- Uzbekistan (11)
