= Li Yi (triple jumper) =

Chinese athlete (born 2005)

Yi Li
Personal information
- Born: 26 November 2005 (age 20) Zhuzhou, China

Sport
- Sport: Athletics
- Event: Triple jump

Achievements and titles
- Personal bests: Long jump: 6.21m (2025); Triple jump: 13.93m (2025)
Medal record
Women's athletics
Representing China
Asian Games
| Bronze medal – third place | 2026 Aichi-Nagoya | Triple jump |
Asian Championships
| Gold medal – first place | 2025 Gumi | Triple jump |
Asian Indoor Championships
| Silver medal – second place | 2026 Tianjin | Triple jump |
World U20 Championships
| Silver medal – second place | 2024 Lima | Triple jump |

Li Yi (born 26 November 2005) is a Chinese triple jumper. She won the 2025 Asian Athletics Championships and the 2025 Chinese Athletics Championships.

== Biography ==
Li Yi jumped a personal best of 13.99 metres in Bengbu in May 2024. She won the silver medal in the triple jump at the 2024 World Athletics U20 Championships in Lima, Peru, behind Uzbek athlete Sharifa Davronova.

She placed seventh in the triple jump at the 2025 World Athletics Indoor Championships in Nanjing, China, with a jump of 13.84 metres. She jumped 13.80 metres (-0.9 m/s) and won the gold medal at the 2025 Asian Athletics Championships in Gumi, South Korea ahead of Sharifa Davronova, at the age of 19 years-old.

She won the Chinese Athletics Championships in August 2025 in Quzhou with a jump of 13.93 metres. In September 2025, she competed at the 2025 World Championships in Tokyo, Japan, without advancing to the final.. In September 2026, she won a bronze medal in her first Asian Games at Nagoya, Japan.

With a triple jump of 13.83 metres she won the bronze medal at the 2026 Asian Games in Japan.

== Personal life ==
From Hunan, she studies at Central China Normal University.
