= Zeng Rui =

Chinese athlete

Personal information
- Born: 6 February 1998 (age 28)

Sport
- Sport: Athletics
- Event: Triple jump

Achievements and titles
- Personal bests: Triple jump: 14.26m (Shanyang, 2024)
Medal record
Women's athletics
Representing China
Asian Games
Silver medal – second place	2022 Hangzhou	Triple jump
Asian Championships
Silver medal – second place	2023 Bangkok	Triple jump
Silver medal – second place	2019 Doha	Triple jump
Asian Indoor Championships
Silver medal – second place	2024 Tehran	Triple jump
World Youth Championships
Silver medal – second place	2015 Cali	Triple jump

Zeng Rui (born 6 February 1998) is a Chinese triple jumper. She has won Chinese national titles indoors and outdoors.

== Career ==
In 2015, she won a silver medal at the World U18 Championships in Cali, Colombia. She won a silver medal at the Asian Championships in Doha in 2019.

She won the Chinese indoor title in Tianjin in March 2023. She won the Chinese national title in Shenyang in June 2023.

She won a silver medal at the Asian Championships in Bangkok in 2023. She won silver at the Asian Games in Hangzhou in October 2023.

She won silver at the Asian Indoor Championships in Tehran in February 2024. She retained her Chinese national title in Rizhao in June 2024. She competed in the triple jump at the 2024 Paris Olympics.
