= Mariya Ovchinnikova =

Kazakhstani triple jumper (born 1998)

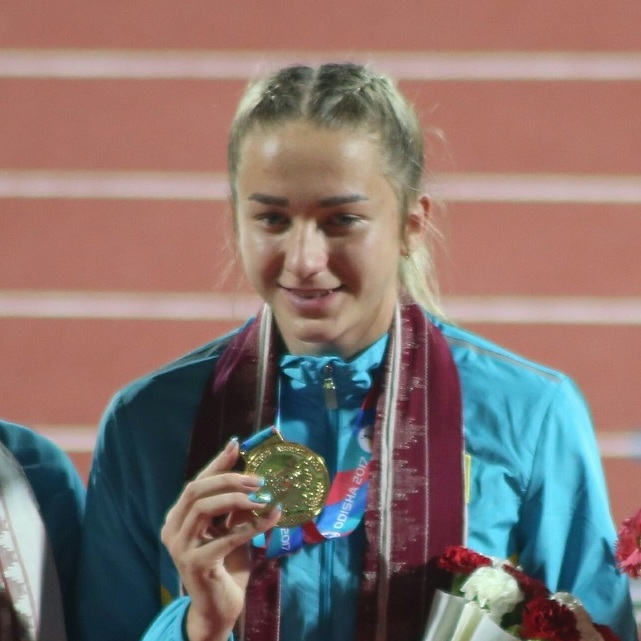
- Mariya Ovchinnikova in 2017

Personal information
- Native name: Мария Анатольевна Овчинникова
- Full name: Mariya Anatolyevna Ovchinnikova
- Born: 19 October 1998 (age 27) Temirtau, Kazakhstan
- Education: s
- Height: 1.78 m (5 ft 10 in)
- Weight: 62 kg (137 lb)

Sport
- Country: Kazakhstan
- Sport: Athletics
- Events: Triple jump, Long jump
- Club: s
- Coached by: Larisa Ivshina, Natalya Zorina

Achievements and titles
- Highest world ranking: s
- Personal bests: triple jump – 13.94 m (2017); triple jump indoor – 13.49 m (2017); long jump – 6.13 m (2017); long jump indoor – 5.92 m (2017)
Medal record
Women's athletics
Representing Kazakhstan
Asian Championships
Gold medal – first place	2017 Bhubaneswar	Triple jump
Asian Indoor Championships
Bronze medal – third place	2024 Tehran	Triple jump
Bronze medal – third place	2026 Tianjin	Triple jump
Asian Indoor and Martial Arts Games
Silver medal – second place	2017 Ashgabat	Triple jump

Mariya Anatolyevna Ovchinnikova (Russian: Мария Анатольевна Овчинникова, born 19 October 1998 in Temirtau), also known as Mariya Yefremova (Мария Ефремова), is a Kazakhstani athlete specialising in the triple jump. She represented her country at the 2017 World Championships without advancing to the final. In addition, she won a gold medal at the 2017 Asian Championships. She also represented Kazakhstan at the 2022 World Athletics Championships, competing in Triple jump.

== International competitions ==
Year	Competition	Venue	Position	Event	Notes
Representing Kazakhstan
2015	Asian Youth Championships	Doha, Qatar	2nd	Medley relay	2:17.72
2015	Asian Youth Championships	Doha, Qatar	1st	Triple jump	12.81 m
2015	World Youth Championships	Cali, Colombia	7th	Triple jump	12.94 m
2016	Asian Junior Championships	Ho Chi Minh City, Vietnam	5th	4 × 100 m relay	46.90
2016	Asian Junior Championships	Ho Chi Minh City, Vietnam	11th	Long jump	5.68
2016	Asian Junior Championships	Ho Chi Minh City, Vietnam	2nd	Triple jump	13.19 m
2016	World U20 Championships	Bydgoszcz, Poland	8th	Triple jump	13.17 m
2017	Asian Championships	Bhubaneswar, India	1st	Triple jump	13.72 m
2017	World Championships	London, United Kingdom	26th (q)	Triple jump	13.18 m
2017	Universiade	Taipei, Taiwan	5th	Triple jump	13.39 m
2017	Asian Indoor and Martial Arts Games	Ashgabat, Turkmenistan	2nd	Triple jump	13.21 m
2018	Asian Indoor Championships	Tehran, Iran	4th	Triple jump	13.00 m
2019	Universiade	Naples, Italy	8th	Triple jump	13.37 m
2021	Olympic Games	Tokyo, Japan	26th (q)	Triple jump	13.34 m
2024	Asian Indoor Championships	Tehran, Iran	3rd	Triple jump	13.48 m
2025	Asian Championships	Gumi, South Korea	6th	Triple jump	13.57 m
2026	Asian Indoor Championships	Tianjin, China	3rd	Triple jump	13.68 m

== Personal bests ==
Outdoor

- Long jump – 6.13 (+0.5 m/s, Almaty 2017)
- Triple jump – 13.94 (0.0 m/s, Almaty 2017)

Indoor

- Long jump – 5.92 (Kamenogorsk 2017)
- Triple jump – 13.49 (Kamenogorsk 2017)
