= Georgiana Iuliana Anitei =

Romanian triple jumper

Personal information
- Nationality: Română
- Born: 26 March 1999 (age 27) Bacău
- Height: 1.80
- Weight: 65

Sport
- Country: Romania
- Sport: Athletics
- Event: Triple jump
- Club: CSM București

Achievements and titles
- Personal best: 13,60 m: Triple jump: 13.60 m (2015)

Georgiana Iuliana Anitei (born 26 March 1999) is a Romanian female triple jumper, who won an individual gold medal at the Youth World Championships.
