= Parinya Chuaimaroeng =

Thai long and triple jumper

Parinya Chuaimaroeng (Thai: ปริญญา เฉื่อยมะเริง; born 16 December 1997 in Udon Thani) is a Thai long and triple jumper.

In the triple jump she finished sixth at the 2017 Asian Indoor Games, won the bronze medal at the 2017 Southeast Asian Games, won the silver medal at the 2018 Asian Games, finished seventh at the 2018 Continental Cup and won the gold medal at the 2019 Asian Championships.

In the long jump she won the silver medal at the 2016 Asian Junior Championships, finished ninth at the 2016 World U20 Championships, sixth at the 2017 Southeast Asian Games and seventh at the 2018 Asian Games.

Her personal best jumps are 14.17 metres, achieved in May 2018 in Taipei; and 6.41 metres, achieved in May 2018 in Bangkok.
