= 2025 Asian Athletics Championships – Men's 400 metres =

Men's 400 metres at the 2025 Asian Athletics Championships
- Venue: Gumi Civic Stadium
- Location: Gumi, South Korea
- Dates: 27 May (heats & semi-finals); 28 May (final)
- Winning time: 45.33

Medalists
| gold medal | Ammar Ibrahim | Qatar |
| silver medal | Kentaro Sato | Japan |
| bronze medal | Kalinga Kumarage | Sri Lanka |

The men's 400 metres event at the 2025 Asian Athletics Championships was held on 27 and 28 May.

== Records ==
Records before the 2025 Asian Athletics Championships
| Record | Athlete (nation) | Time (s) | Location | Date |
|---|---|---|---|---|
| World record | Wayde Van Niekerk (RSA) | 43.03 | Rio de Janeiro, Brazil | 14 August 2016 |
| Asian record | Yousef Masrahi (KSA) | 43.93 | Beijing, China | 23 August 2015 |
| Championship record | Sugath Thilakaratne (SRI) | 44.61 | Fukuoka, Japan | 20 July 1998 |
| World leading | Jacory Patterson (USA) | 43.98 | Miramar, United States | 3 May 2025 |
| Asian leading | Fuga Sato (JPN) | 45.23 | Tokyo, Japan | 18 May 2025 |

== Schedule ==
The event schedule, in local time (UTC+9), was as follows:

| Date | Time | Round |
|---|---|---|
| 27 May | 09:40 | Heats |
| 27 May | 15:40 | Semi-finals |
| 28 May | 17:40 | Final |

== Results ==
=== Heats ===
Held on 27 May. First 3 in each heat (Q) and the next 4 fastest (q) qualified for the semi-finals.

==== Heat 1 ====
| Place | Lane | Athlete | Nation | Time | Notes |
|---|---|---|---|---|---|
| 1 | 7 | Fu Haoran | China | 46.21 | Q, PB |
| 2 | 4 | Vishal Kayalvizhi | India | 46.81 | Q |
| 3 | 6 | Ashraf Osman | Qatar | 46.92 | Q |
| 4 | 8 | Ibrahim Fatini | Saudi Arabia | 47.50 | q |
| 5 | 3 | Abbosbek Toshtemirov | Uzbekistan | 47.81 | PB |
| 6 | 5 | Aruna Dharshana | Sri Lanka | 48.10 | |
| 7 | 2 | Huang Jingsong | Macau | 49.78 | |

==== Heat 2 ====
| Place | Lane | Athlete | Nation | Time | Notes |
|---|---|---|---|---|---|
| 1 | 5 | Zhang Qining | China | 46.48 | Q |
| 2 | 6 | Kentaro Sato | Japan | 46.58 | Q |
| 3 | 7 | Shin Min-kyu | South Korea | 46.76 | Q |
| 4 | 8 | Yousef Karam | Kuwait | 46.94 | q, SB |
| 5 | 3 | Shajar Abbas Awan | Pakistan | 47.17 | q, PB |
| 6 | 2 | Kharis Pantonial | Philippines | 48.93 | |
| — | 4 | Mazen Al-Yassin | Saudi Arabia | DNF | |

==== Heat 3 ====
| Place | Lane | Athlete | Nation | Time | Notes |
|---|---|---|---|---|---|
| 1 | 6 | Fuga Sato | Japan | 46.40 | Q |
| 2 | 4 | Kalinga Kumarage | Sri Lanka | 46.59 | Q |
| 3 | 7 | Umar Osman | Malaysia | 46.71 | Q |
| 4 | 3 | Taha Hussein Yaseen | Iraq | 47.14 | q |
| 5 | 8 | Chan Chun Ho | Hong Kong | 47.56 | PB |
| 6 | 5 | Tạ Ngọc Tưởng | Vietnam | 47.63 | PB |
| 7 | 2 | Dilshodbek Bobokulov | Uzbekistan | 49.93 | |

==== Heat 4 ====
| Place | Lane | Athlete | Nation | Time | Notes |
|---|---|---|---|---|---|
| 1 | 4 | Ammar Ibrahim | Qatar | 46.71 | Q |
| 2 | 5 | Jay Kumar | India | 47.26 | Q |
| 3 | 7 | Joo Seung-kyun | South Korea | 47.71 | Q |
| 4 | 1 | Ruslan Litovskii | Kyrgyzstan | 48.17 | |
| 5 | 8 | Elnur Mukhitdinov | Kazakhstan | 48.39 | |
| 6 | 3 | Luqmanul Akmal | Malaysia | 48.77 | SB |
| 7 | 6 | Abdul Mueed | Pakistan | 50.10 | SB |
| 8 | 2 | Turtogtokh Erdenebat | Mongolia | 51.99 | SB |

=== Semi-finals ===
Held on 27 May. First 3 in each heat (Q) and the next 2 fastest (q) qualified for the final.

==== Heat 1 ====
| Place | Lane | Athlete | Nation | Time | Notes |
|---|---|---|---|---|---|
| 1 | 4 | Ammar Ibrahim | Qatar | 46.05 | Q |
| 2 | 5 | Kentaro Sato | Japan | 46.19 | Q |
| 3 | 3 | Umar Osman | Malaysia | 46.73 | Q |
| 4 | 7 | Jay Kumar | India | 46.87 | |
| 5 | 8 | Joo Seung-kyun | South Korea | 47.31 | |
| 6 | 1 | Yousef Karam | Kuwait | 47.39 | |
| 7 | 2 | Ibrahim Fatini | Saudi Arabia | 47.49 | |
| 8 | 6 | Fu Haoran | China | 49.99 | |

==== Heat 2 ====
| Place | Lane | Athlete | Nation | Time | Notes |
|---|---|---|---|---|---|
| 1 | 4 | Fuga Sato | Japan | 45.74 [.735] | Q |
| 2 | 6 | Kalinga Kumarage | Sri Lanka | 45.74 [.740] | Q, SB |
| 3 | 7 | Vishal Kayalvizhi | India | 46.05 | Q, PB |
| 4 | 8 | Ashraf Osman | Qatar | 46.12 | q |
| 5 | 3 | Shin Min-kyu | South Korea | 46.44 | q |
| 6 | 1 | Taha Hussein Yaseen | Iraq | 47.07 | SB |
| 7 | 2 | Shajar Abbas Awan | Pakistan | 47.38 | |
| 8 | 5 | Zhang Qining | China | 48.89 | |

=== Final ===
| Place | Lane | Athlete | Nation | Time | Notes |
|---|---|---|---|---|---|
| 1st place, gold medalist(s) | 5 | Ammar Ibrahim | Qatar | 45.33 | SB |
| 2nd place, silver medalist(s) | 7 | Kentaro Sato | Japan | 45.50 | SB |
| 3rd place, bronze medalist(s) | 6 | Kalinga Kumarage | Sri Lanka | 45.55 | SB |
| 4 | 3 | Vishal Kayalvizhi | India | 45.57 | PB |
| 5 | 4 | Fuga Sato | Japan | 45.59 | |
| 6 | 2 | Shin Min-kyu | South Korea | 45.74 | PB |
| 7 | 1 | Ashraf Osman | Qatar | 45.91 | SB |
| 8 | 8 | Umar Osman | Malaysia | 46.25 | SB |
