= Athletics at the 2022 Asian Games – Men's 400 metres =

Men's 400 metres at the 2022 Asian Games
- Venue: Hangzhou Olympic Expo Main Stadium
- Date: 29–30 September 2023
- Competitors: 22 from 16 nations

Medalists
| gold medal | Yousef Masrahi | Saudi Arabia |
| silver medal | Kentaro Sato | Japan |
| bronze medal | Abbas Yusuf Ali | Bahrain |

The men's 400 metres competition at the 2022 Asian Games took place on 29 and 30 September 2023 at the HOC Stadium, Hangzhou.

== Schedule ==
All times are China Standard Time (UTC+08:00)

| Date | Time | Event |
|---|---|---|
| Friday, 29 September 2023 | 19:25 | Round 1 |
| Saturday, 30 September 2023 | 20:10 | Final |

== Records ==
Prior to this competition, the existing world, Asian and Games records were as follows.

| World Record | Wayde van Niekerk (RSA) | 43.03 | Rio de Janeiro, Brazil | 14 August 2016 |
| Asian Record | Yousef Masrahi (KSA) | 43.93 | Beijing, China | 23 August 2015 |
| Games Record | Yousef Masrahi (KSA) | 44.46 | Incheon, South Korea | 28 September 2014 |

== Results ==
Legend

- DSQ — Disqualified

=== Round 1 ===
- Qualification: First 2 in each heat (Q) and the next 2 fastest (q) advance to the final.

==== Heat 1 ====
| Rank | Athlete | Time | Notes |
|---|---|---|---|
| 1 | Kalinga Kumarage (SRI) | 45.57 | Q |
| 2 | Abbas Yusuf Ali (BRN) | 45.77 | Q |
| 3 | Muhammed Anas (IND) | 46.29 | |
| 4 | Ashraf Osman (QAT) | 46.82 | |
| 5 | Sarawut Nuansi (THA) | 47.02 | |
| 6 | Thiruben Thana Rajan (SGP) | 47.26 | |
| — | Tshering Penjor (BHU) | DSQ | |
| — | Naraugiin Jandos (MGL) | DSQ | |

==== Heat 2 ====
| Rank | Athlete | Time | Notes |
|---|---|---|---|
| 1 | Kentaro Sato (JPN) | 45.57 | Q |
| 2 | Muhammad Ajmal Variyathodi (IND) | 45.76 | Q |
| 3 | Ismail Abakar (QAT) | 46.03 | q |
| 4 | Mazen Al-Yassin (KSA) | 46.13 | |
| 5 | Som Bahadur Kumal (NEP) | 48.68 | |
| 6 | Kim Ui-yeon (KOR) | 48.68 | |
| 7 | Ruslan Litovskii (KGZ) | 50.10 | |

==== Heat 3 ====
| Rank | Athlete | Time | Notes |
|---|---|---|---|
| 1 | Fuga Sato (JPN) | 45.56 | Q |
| 2 | Yousef Masrahi (KSA) | 45.64 | Q |
| 3 | Aruna Darshana (SRI) | 46.07 | q |
| 4 | Umar Osman (MAS) | 46.58 | |
| 5 | Yefim Tarassov (KAZ) | 47.09 | |
| 6 | Muhammad Asad-ur-Rehman (PAK) | 48.60 | |
| 7 | Erdenebatyn Turtogtokh (MGL) | 50.10 | |

=== Final ===
| Rank | Athlete | Time | Notes |
|---|---|---|---|
| 1st place, gold medalist(s) | Yousef Masrahi (KSA) | 45.55 | |
| 2nd place, silver medalist(s) | Kentaro Sato (JPN) | 45.57 | |
| 3rd place, bronze medalist(s) | Abbas Yusuf Ali (BRN) | 45.65 | |
| 4 | Fuga Sato (JPN) | 45.70 | |
| 5 | Muhammad Ajmal Variyathodi (IND) | 45.97 | |
| 6 | Aruna Darshan (SRI) | 46.09 | |
| 7 | Kalinga Kumarage (SRI) | 46.22 | |
| 8 | Ismail Abakar (QAT) | 46.48 | |
