= 2019 Asian Athletics Championships – Men's 400 metres =

Men's 400 metres at the 2019 Asian Athletics Championships
- Venue: Khalifa International Stadium
- Location: Doha, Qatar
- Dates: 21 April (heats & semi-finals); 22 April (final)
- Competitors: 27 from 22 nations
- Winning time: 44.84 NR

Medalists
gold medal	Yousef Karam	Kuwait
silver medal	Abbas Abubakar Abbas	Bahrain
bronze medal	Mikhail Litvin	Kazakhstan

The men's 400 metres at the 2019 Asian Athletics Championships was held on 21 and 22 April.

== Records ==
Records before the 2019 Asian Athletics Championships
Record	Athlete (nation)	Time (s)	Location	Date
World record	Wayde Van Niekerk (RSA)	43.03	Rio de Janeiro, Brazil	14 August 2016
Asian record	Yousef Masrahi (KSA)	43.93	Beijing, China	23 August 2015
Championship record	Sugath Thilakaratne (SRI)	44.61	Fukuoka, Japan	20 July 1998
World leading	Michael Norman (USA)	43.45	Torrance, United States	20 April 2019
Asian leading	Abderrahman Samba (QAT)	44.60	Pretoria, South Africa	9 April 2019

== Results ==
=== Heats ===
Qualification rule: First 3 in each heat (Q) and the next 4 fastest (q) qualified for the semifinals.

Rank	Heat	Name	Nationality	Time	Notes
1	3	Julian Jrummi Walsh	Japan	46.00	Q
2	4	Arokia Rajiv	India	46.25	Q
3	1	Taha Hussein Yassen	Iraq	46.27	Q, NR
4	1	Abbas Abubakar Abbas	Bahrain	46.27	Q
5	1	Muhammed Anas Yahiya	India	46.36	Q
6	1	Ashraf Hussein Osman	Qatar	46.54	q, PB
7	4	Rikuya Ito	Japan	46.59	Q, SB
8	2	Mikhail Litvin	Kazakhstan	46.72	Q
9	2	Mehboob Ali	Pakistan	46.96	Q
10	3	Mo Il-hwan	South Korea	47.01	Q
11	2	Mohamed Nasir Abbas	Qatar	47.05	Q
12	2	Yasir Ali Al-Saadi	Iraq	47.15	q
13	2	Phitchaya Sunthonthuam	Thailand	47.31	q
13	3	Ajith Premakumara Millagaha Gedara	Sri Lanka	47.31	Q
15	2	Xu Haoran	China	47.40	q, SB
16	4	Yousef Karam	Kuwait	47.47	Q
17	3	Pan Haitao	China	47.69	SB
18	1	Andrey Sokolov	Kazakhstan	47.93	
18	4	Joyme Sequita	Philippines	47.93	
20	4	Grigoriy Derepaskin	Tajikistan	47.94	SB
21	3	Mazen Mawtan Al-Yasen	Saudi Arabia	48.24	
22	4	Ahmed Al-Yaari	Yemen	48.27	NR
23	1	Mohammad Jahir Rayhan	Bangladesh	48.51	
23	2	Kirill Sarasov	Kyrgyzstan	48.51	
25	3	Tan Zongyang	Singapore	49.09	
26	1	Saeed Bahashwan	Yemen	49.72	
27	4	Skhakhzatbek Sadykzhanuulu	Kyrgyzstan	49.95	PB
	3	Hassan Mansour	Lebanon	DNS	

=== Semi-finals ===
Qualification rule: First 3 in each heat (Q) and the next 2 fastest (q) qualified for the final.

Rank	Heat	Name	Nationality	Time	Notes
1	1	Yousef Karam	Kuwait	45.04	Q, PB
2	1	Abbas Abubakar Abbas	Bahrain	45.27	Q, SB
3	1	Mikhail Litvin	Kazakhstan	45.38	Q, NR
4	1	Julian Jrummi Walsh	Japan	45.67	q
5	2	Arokia Rajiv	India	45.96	Q
6	2	Taha Hussein Yassen	Iraq	46.04	Q, NR
7	1	Muhammed Anas Yahiya	India	46.10	q
8	1	Mo Il-hwan	South Korea	46.17	PB
9	2	Rikuya Ito	Japan	46.52	Q, SB
10	1	Ashraf Hussein Osman	Qatar	46.85	
11	1	Yasir Ali Al-Saadi	Iraq	47.01	
12	2	Ajith Premakumara Millagaha Gedara	Sri Lanka	47.07	
13	2	Mohamed Nasir Abbas	Qatar	47.10	
14	2	Phitchaya Sunthonthuam	Thailand	47.15	
15	2	Xu Haoran	China	47.23	SB
16	2	Mehboob Ali	Pakistan	47.61	

=== Final ===
Rank	Lane	Name	Nationality	Time	Notes
1st place, gold medalist(s)	6	Yousef Karam	Kuwait	44.84	NR
2nd place, silver medalist(s)	7	Abbas Abubakar Abbas	Bahrain	45.14	PB
3rd place, bronze medalist(s)	9	Mikhail Litvin	Kazakhstan	45.25	NR
4	4	Arokia Rajiv	India	45.37	PB
5	2	Julian Jrummi Walsh	Japan	45.55	SB
6	5	Taha Hussein Yassen	Iraq	45.74	NR
7	3	Muhammed Anas Yahiya	India	46.10	
	8	Rikuya Ito	Japan	DQ	R163.3a
