= Athletics at the 2020 Summer Olympics – Men's 400 metres =

Men's 400 metres at the Games of the XXXII Olympiad
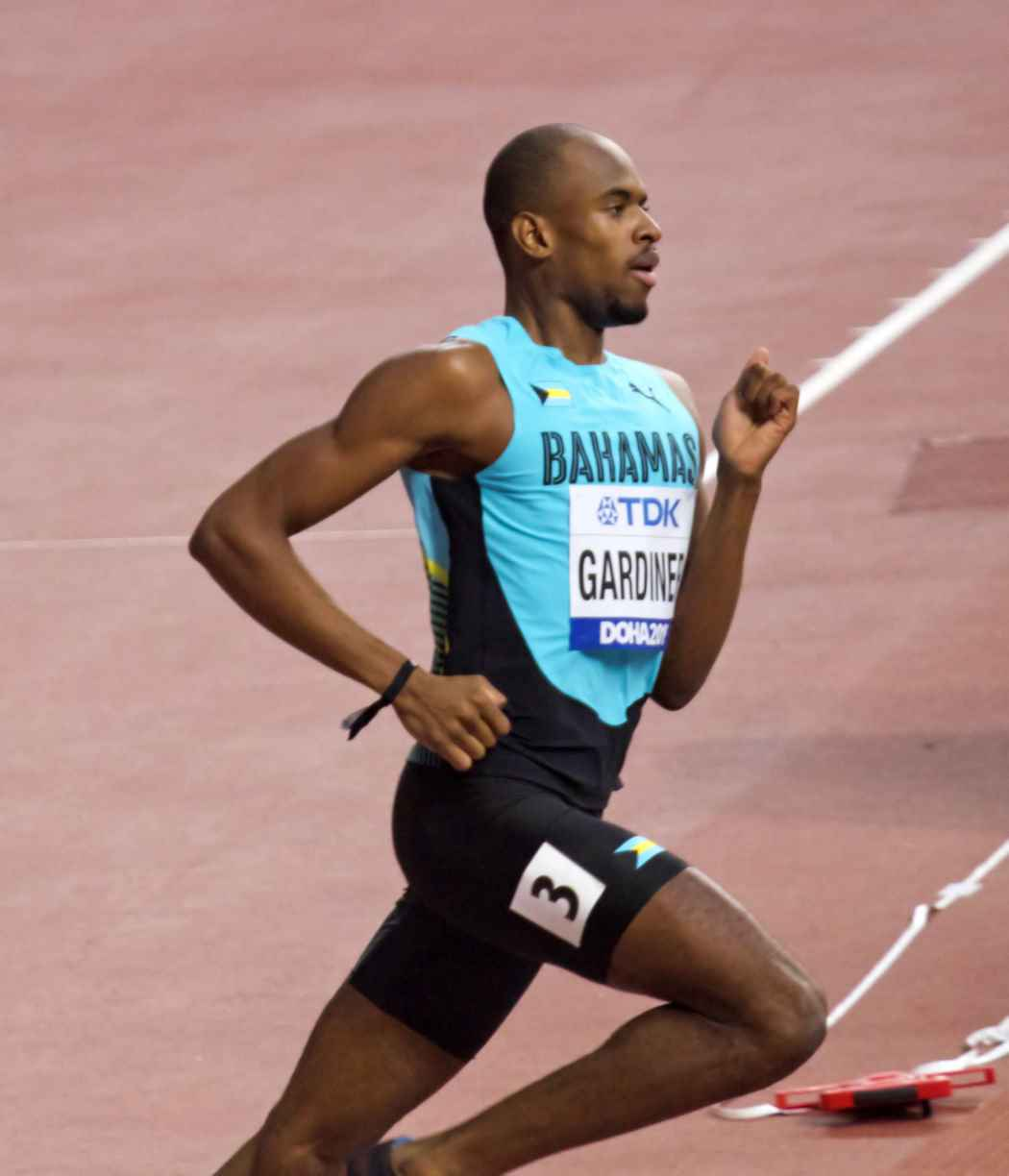
- Gold medalist Steven Gardiner (shown at 2019 World Championship)
- Venue: Olympic Stadium
- Dates: 1 August 2021 (round 1); 2 August 2021 (semifinals); 5 August 2021 (final)
- Competitors: 48 from 33 nations
- Winning time: 43.85

Medalists
1st place, gold medalist(s)		Steven Gardiner	Bahamas
2nd place, silver medalist(s)		Anthony Zambrano	Colombia
3rd place, bronze medalist(s)		Kirani James	Grenada

Official Video Highlights

The men's 400 metres event at the 2020 Summer Olympics took place between 1 and 5 August 2021 at the Olympic Stadium. Approximately fifty athletes were expected to compete; the exact number was dependent on how many nations use universality places to enter athletes in addition to the 48 qualifying through time or ranking (3 universality places were used in 2016). 48 athletes from 33 nations competed. The event was won by 0.23 seconds by Steven Gardiner of the Bahamas, with Anthony Zambrano of Colombia taking silver. Those were the first medals in the men's 400 metres for each of those two nations. Kirani James of Grenada won his third consecutive medal in the event with his bronze, making him the first man to earn three medals in the 400 metres.

== Summary ==
Wayde van Niekerk's world record in Rio put this event in the spotlight. This year, van Niekerk was back to defend, but he was not the same after a 2017 ACL injury during a celebrity rugby match. Silver medalist and 2012 Olympic Champion Kirani James was back from the podium on Rio. The 2019 World Championships presented a completely different set of names, Steven Gardiner, Anthony Zambrano and Fred Kerley, but Kerley focused his efforts on the 100m, netting himself a silver medal in that event. Earlier in the season, Randolph Ross joined the sub 44 club. And other than van Niekerk, the fastest personal record in the field belonged to Indoor World Record holder Michael Norman at 43.45 for =#4 all time.

The first semi final revealed James was in top form, running 43.88. Immediately behind him, Zambrano became the 18th member of the sub 44 club with 43.93. The other semi finals were a little more sane. Deon Lendore ran 44.93 and didn't make the final.

Five members of the sub 44 club were in the final. Starting fast, Norman, Michael Cherry, James and Isaac Makwala made up most of the stagger on the athletes to their outside, Christopher Taylor, Gardiner, Zambrano and Liemarvin Bonevacia respectively. Down the backstretch, Norman and James kept up the pressure, while Cherry and Makwala backed off. Gardiner began to speed up chasing Norman, visible to his outside. Through the final turn Gardiner gained on Norman. To the inside, Zambrano seemed to be marking James who had already made up the stagger and was inside of him. And Makwala ran a strong turn. Coming onto the home straight, James had the edge, with Makwala and Gardiner next, with Norman and Zambrano a metre behind them. James began to strain, Norman and Makwala were losing ground as Gardiner cruised past him into the lead. Zambrano was running fastest of all, passing James. Cherry passed Norman and set sail after James. Gardiner crossed the finish line, easing up with a 2 metre victory. Zambrano had a metre and a half on James and Cherry dipping at the finish line. James got the nod for bronze to complete his set of medals.

== Background ==
This was the 29th appearance of the event, which is one of 12 athletics events to have been held at every Summer Olympics.

For the first time in Olympic history, no nations made their men's 400 metres debut this Games. The United States made its 28th appearance, most of any nation, having missed only the boycotted 1980 Games.

== Qualification ==
A National Olympic Committee (NOC) could enter up to 3 qualified athletes in the men's 400 metres event if all athletes meet the entry standard or qualify by ranking during the qualifying period. (The limit of 3 has been in place since the 1930 Olympic Congress.) The qualifying standard is 44.90 seconds. This standard was "set for the sole purpose of qualifying athletes with exceptional performances unable to qualify through the IAAF World Rankings pathway." The world rankings, based on the average of the best five results for the athlete over the qualifying period and weighted by the importance of the meet, will then be used to qualify athletes until the cap of 48 is reached.

The qualifying period was originally from 1 May 2019 to 29 June 2020. Due to the COVID-19 pandemic, the period was suspended from 6 April 2020 to 30 November 2020, with the end date extended to 29 June 2021. The world rankings period start date was also changed from 1 May 2019 to 30 June 2020; athletes who had met the qualifying standard during that time were still qualified, but those using world rankings would not be able to count performances during that time. The qualifying time standards could be obtained in various meets during the given period that have the approval of the IAAF. Both indoor and outdoor meets are eligible. The most recent Area Championships may be counted in the ranking, even if not during the qualifying period.

NOCs can also use their universality place—each NOC can enter one male athlete regardless of time if they had no male athletes meeting the entry standard for an athletics event—in the 400 metres.

Entry number: 48.

Qualification standard	No. of athletes	NOC	Nominated athletes
Entry standard – 44.90	3	Jamaica	Sean Bailey; Demish Gaye; Christopher Taylor
Entry standard – 44.90	3	United States	Michael Cherry; Michael Norman; Randolph Ross
Entry standard – 44.90	2	Trinidad and Tobago	Machel Cedenio; Dwight St. Hillaire
Entry standard – 44.90	1	Bahamas	Steven Gardiner
Entry standard – 44.90	1	Bahrain	Abbas Abubakar Abbas
Entry standard – 44.90	1	Barbados	Jonathan Jones
Entry standard – 44.90	1	Botswana	Isaac Makwala
Entry standard – 44.90	1	Colombia	Anthony Zambrano
Entry standard – 44.90	1	Grenada	Kirani James
Entry standard – 44.90	1	Italy	Davide Re
Entry standard – 44.90	1	Kenya	Emmanuel Korir
Entry standard – 44.90	1	Nigeria	Emmanuel Bamidele
Entry standard – 44.90	1	South Africa	Wayde van Niekerk
World ranking	2	Australia	Alex Beck; Steven Solomon
World ranking	2	Belgium	Kevin Borlée; Jonathan Sacoor
World ranking	2	Netherlands	Liemarvin Bonevacia; Jochem Dobber
World ranking	2	South Africa	Zakithi Nene; Thapelo Phora
World ranking	1	Bahamas	Alonzo Russell
World ranking	1	Botswana	Leungo Scotch
World ranking	1	Brazil	Lucas Carvalho
World ranking	1	Colombia	Jhon Perlaza
World ranking	1	Czech Republic	Pavel Maslák
World ranking	1	Germany	Marvin Schlegel
World ranking	1	Great Britain	Matthew Hudson-Smith
World ranking	1	Italy	Edoardo Scotti
World ranking	1	Japan	Julian Walsh
World ranking	1	Kazakhstan	Mikhail Litvin
World ranking	1	Kuwait	Yousef Karam
World ranking	1	Poland	Karol Zalewski
World ranking	1	Portugal	Ricardo dos Santos
World ranking	1	Saudi Arabia	Mazen Al-Yassin
World ranking	1	Slovenia	Luka Janežič
World ranking	1	Spain	Óscar Husillos
World ranking	1	Switzerland	Ricky Petrucciani
World ranking	1	Trinidad and Tobago	Deon Lendore
Universality Places	1	Bangladesh	Mohammad Jahir Rayhan
Universality Places	1	Chad	Bachir Mahamat
Universality Places	1	Iraq	Taha Hussein Yaseen
Universality Places	1	Madagascar	Todisoa Rabearison
Universality Places	1	North Macedonia	Jovan Stojoski
Universality Places	1	Sudan	Sadam Koumi
Universality Places	1	Yemen	Ahmed Al-Yaari
Total	48		

== Competition format ==
The event continued to use the three-round format introduced in 2004. There were 6 heats, with the top 3 in each heat and the next 6 fastest overall advancing to the semifinals. There were 3 semifinals, with the top 2 in each semifinal and the next 2 overall advancing to the final.

== Records ==
Prior to this competition, the existing global and area records were as follows:

World record	Wayde van Niekerk (RSA)	43.03	Rio de Janeiro, Brazil	14 August 2016
Olympic record	Wayde van Niekerk (RSA)	43.03	Rio de Janeiro, Brazil	14 August 2016
World Leading	Randolph Ross (USA)	43.85	Eugene, Oregon, United States	11 June 2021

Area
Area	Time (s)	Athlete	Nation
Africa (records)	43.03 WR	Wayde van Niekerk	South Africa
Asia (records)	43.93	Yousef Ahmed Masrahi	Saudi Arabia
Europe (records)	44.33	Thomas Schönlebe	East Germany
North, Central America and Caribbean (records)	43.18	Michael Johnson	United States
Oceania (records)	44.38	Darren Clark	Australia
South America (records)	44.15	Anthony Zambrano	Colombia

The following national records were established during the competition:

Country	Athlete	Round	Time	Notes
Colombia	Anthony Zambrano	Semifinals	43.93	AR
Netherlands	Liemarvin Bonevacia	Semifinals	44.62	

== Schedule ==
All times are Japan Standard Time (UTC+9)

The men's 400 metres took place over three separate days.

Date	Time	Round
Sunday, 1 August 2021	9:10	Round 1
Monday, 2 August 2021	19:00	Semifinals
Thursday, 5 August 2021	19:00	Final

== Results ==
=== Round 1 ===
Qualification rule: first 3 of each heat (Q) plus the 6 fastest times (q) qualified.

==== Heat 1 ====
Rank	Lane	Athlete	Nation	Reaction	Time	Notes
1	9	Isaac Makwala	Botswana	0.197	44.86	Q
2	5	Kirani James	Grenada	0.160	45.09	Q
3	8	Jonathan Sacoor	Belgium	0.151	45.41	Q
4	3	Demish Gaye	Jamaica	0.165	45.49	q
5	6	Alonzo Russell	Bahamas	0.223	45.51	q, SB
6	7	Alex Beck	Australia	0.160	45.54	PB
7	2	Ricardo dos Santos	Portugal	0.140	46.83	
8	4	Bachir Mahamat	Chad	0.206	47.93	SB

==== Heat 2 ====
Rank	Lane	Athlete	Nation	Reaction	Time	Notes
1	6	Mazen Al-Yassin	Saudi Arabia	0.163	45.16	Q, PB
2	5	Kevin Borlée	Belgium	0.126	45.36	Q, SB
3	7	Ricky Petrucciani	Switzerland	0.168	45.64	Q
4	9	Randolph Ross	United States	0.227	45.67	
5	8	Zakithi Nene	South Africa	0.147	45.74	
6	4	Jhon Perlaza	Colombia	0.159	46.55	
7	2	Pavel Maslák	Czech Republic	0.196	47.01	
8	3	Ahmed Al-Yaari	Yemen	0.183	48.53	SB

==== Heat 3 ====
Rank	Lane	Athlete	Nation	Reaction	Time	Notes
1	2	Michael Cherry	United States	0.178	44.82	Q
2	9	Jonathan Jones	Barbados	0.181	45.04	Q, SB
3	7	Christopher Taylor	Jamaica	0.151	45.20	Q
4	6	Dwight St. Hillaire	Trinidad and Tobago	0.176	45.41	q
5	4	Luka Janežič	Slovenia	0.163	45.44	q, SB
6	5	Gilles Anthony Afoumba	Republic of the Congo	0.199	46.03	SB
7	8	Lucas Carvalho	Brazil	0.172	46.12	
8	3	Mohammad Jahir Rayhan	Bangladesh	0.170	48.29	SB

==== Heat 4 ====
Rank	Lane	Athlete	Nation	Reaction	Time	Notes
1	3	Anthony Zambrano	Colombia	0.167	44.87	Q
2	4	Steven Solomon	Australia	0.163	44.94	Q, PB
3	7	Wayde van Niekerk	South Africa	0.162	45.25	Q
4	5	Leungo Scotch	Botswana	0.186	45.32	q
5	9	Davide Re	Italy	0.171	45.46	q, SB
6	6	Julian Walsh	Japan	0.146	46.57	
7	2	Jovan Stojoski	North Macedonia	0.184	46.81	PB
	8	Emmanuel Korir	Kenya		DQ	TR 16.8

==== Heat 5 ====
Rank	Lane	Athlete	Nation	Reaction	Time	Notes
1	2	Steven Gardiner	Bahamas	0.163	45.05	Q
2	3	Deon Lendore	Trinidad and Tobago	0.203	45.14	Q
3	9	Jochem Dobber	Netherlands	0.179	45.54	Q
4	4	Nathon Allen	Jamaica	0.138	46.12	
5	5	Sadam Koumi	Sudan	0.143	46.26	SB
6	6	Marvin Schlegel	Germany	0.200	46.39	
7	7	Mikhail Litvin	Kazakhstan	0.210	47.15	
8	8	Karol Zalewski	Poland	0.154	2:15.38	

==== Heat 6 ====
Rank	Lane	Athlete	Nation	Reaction	Time	Notes
1	4	Liemarvin Bonevacia	Netherlands	0.171	44.95	Q
2	6	Michael Norman	United States	0.157	45.35	Q
3	8	Machel Cedenio	Trinidad and Tobago	0.218	45.56	Q
4	9	Edoardo Scotti	Italy	0.169	45.71	
5	7	Thapelo Phora	South Africa	0.150	45.83	SB
6	5	Taha Hussein Yaseen	Iraq	0.144	46.00	SB
7	3	Óscar Husillos	Spain	0.147	48.05	
8	2	Todisoa Rabearison	Madagascar	0.196	48.40	SB

=== Semifinals ===
Qualification rule: first 2 of each heat (Q) plus the 2 fastest times (q) qualified.

==== Semifinal 1 ====
Rank	Lane	Athlete	Nation	Reaction	Time	Notes
1	5	Kirani James	Grenada	0.160	43.88	Q, SB
2	6	Anthony Zambrano	Colombia	0.175	43.93	Q, AR
3	4	Liemarvin Bonevacia	Netherlands	0.160	44.62	q, NR
4	7	Deon Lendore	Trinidad and Tobago	0.193	44.93	
5	3	Davide Re	Italy	0.157	44.94	SB
6	9	Ricky Petrucciani	Switzerland	0.140	45.26	
7	2	Luka Janežič	Slovenia	0.152	45.36	SB
8	8	Jonathan Sacoor	Belgium	0.136	45.88	

==== Semifinal 2 ====
Rank	Lane	Athlete	Nation	Reaction	Time	Notes
1	6	Michael Cherry	United States	0.162	44.44	Q
2	8	Christopher Taylor	Jamaica	0.164	44.92	Q, SB
3	5	Steven Solomon	Australia	0.168	45.15	
4	4	Mazen Al-Yassin	Saudi Arabia	0.154	45.37	
5	2	Leungo Scotch	Botswana	0.178	45.56	
6	9	Machel Cedenio	Trinidad and Tobago	0.192	45.86	
7	3	Alonzo Russell	Bahamas	0.169	46.04	
—	7	Kevin Borlée	Belgium		DNS	

==== Semifinal 3 ====
Rank	Lane	Athlete	Nation	Reaction	Time	Notes
1	6	Steven Gardiner	Bahamas	0.152	44.14	Q, SB
2	7	Michael Norman	United States	0.156	44.52	Q
3	4	Isaac Makwala	Botswana	0.197	44.59	q
4	3	Demish Gaye	Jamaica	0.155	45.09	SB
5	8	Wayde van Niekerk	South Africa	0.381	45.14	
6	9	Jochem Dobber	Netherlands	0.191	45.48	
7	2	Dwight St. Hillaire	Trinidad and Tobago	0.153	45.58	
8	5	Jonathan Jones	Barbados	0.159	45.61	

=== Final ===
Rank	Lane	Athlete	Nation	Reaction	Time	Notes
1st place, gold medalist(s)	7	Steven Gardiner	Bahamas	0.179	43.85	SB
2nd place, silver medalist(s)	5	Anthony Zambrano	Colombia	0.166	44.08	
3rd place, bronze medalist(s)	4	Kirani James	Grenada	0.157	44.19	
4	6	Michael Cherry	United States	0.179	44.21	PB
5	8	Michael Norman	United States	0.148	44.31	
6	9	Christopher Taylor	Jamaica	0.158	44.79	PB
7	2	Isaac Makwala	Botswana	0.167	44.94	
8	3	Liemarvin Bonevacia	Netherlands	0.168	45.07	
