= 2019 World Athletics Championships – Men's 400 metres =

Men's 400 metres at the 2019 World Championships
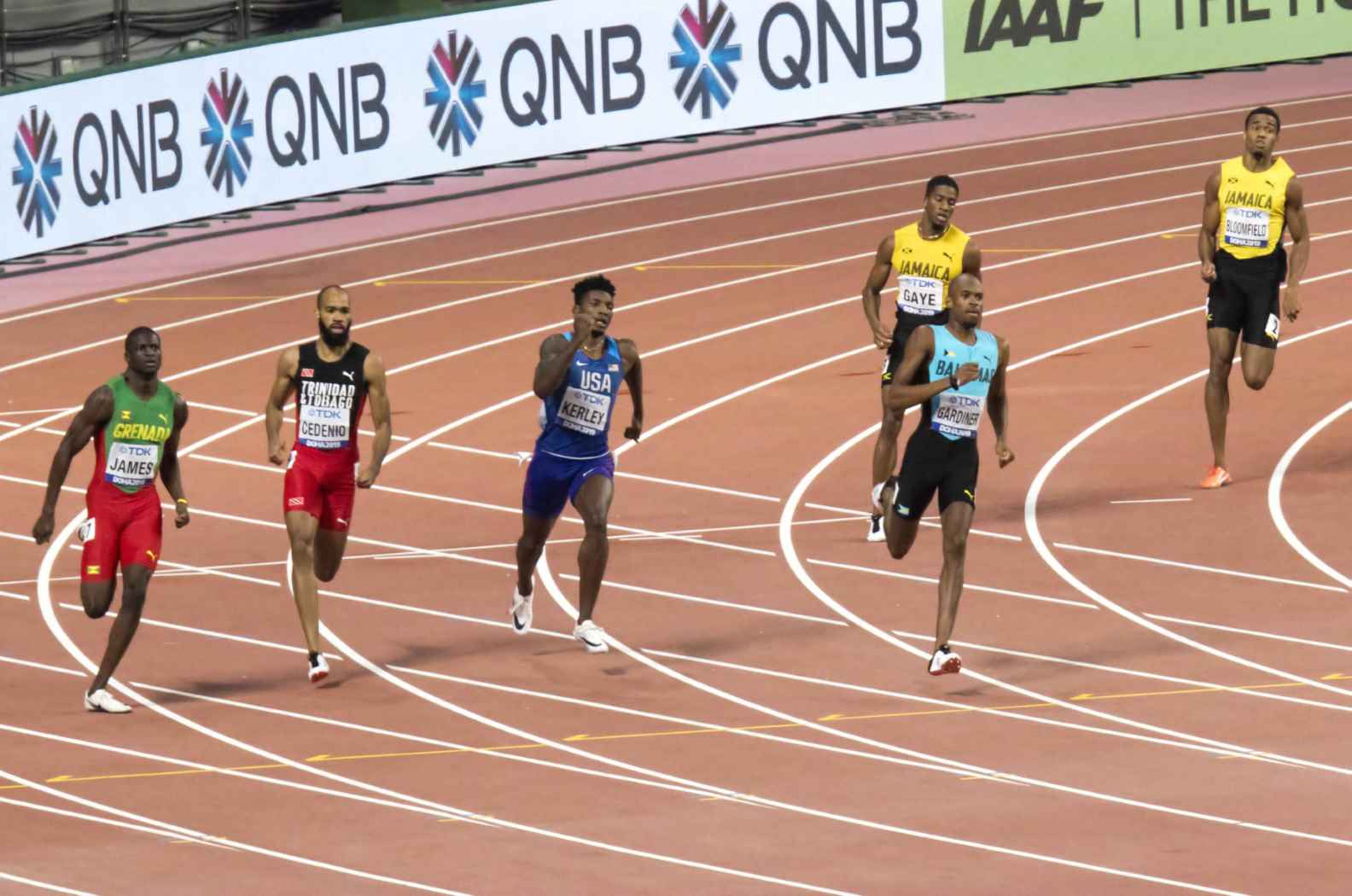
- The home straight.
- Venue: Khalifa International Stadium
- Dates: 1 October (heats); 2 October (semi-finals); 4 October (final)
- Competitors: 42 from 31 nations
- Winning time: 43.48

Medalists
| gold medal | Steven Gardiner | Bahamas |
| silver medal | Anthony Zambrano | Colombia |
| bronze medal | Fred Kerley | United States |

Video on YouTube Official Video

The men's 400 metres at the 2019 World Athletics Championships was held at the Khalifa International Stadium in Doha on 1, 2 and 4 October 2019. The winning margin was 0.67 seconds which as of 2024 is the greatest winning margin in the men's 400 metres at these championships since the retirement of Michael Johnson.

== Summary ==
Kirani James had the pedigree -- a World Championship and an Olympic gold medal -- but those were back in 2011 and 2012. He finished second behind Wayde van Niekerk's world record at the last Olympics. Van Niekerk couldn't compete because he injured his knee in a celebrity rugby game and James was battling Graves' disease, the same ailment that affected Gail Devers. With a faster personal best, American champion Fred Kerley had been anticipated as USA's next golden boy until Michael Norman came on the scene with a relaxed, early season personal best that only equalled the #4 time in history. But Norman took himself out of the final, jogging home the second half of his semi-final. The other sub-44 qualifiers were Steven Gardiner, who had run his on this track in May and Akeem Bloomfield, who was the last time qualifier to get in. Gardiner led the qualifying, while Anthony Zambrano had to set a Colombian national record to get in.

In the final, James went out hard, passing Zambrano to his outside as they entered the backstretch. Inside of James, Machel Cedenio, James, Gardiner and Demish Gaye were running true to the stagger. James held that lead until midway through the final turn when he began to fade back as Gardiner was emerging slightly ahead. Coming onto the home straight, Gardiner held a 2 metre lead over James and Kerley, with Cedenio just slightly behind them. A further 2 metres back was Zambrano and Gaye. Down the stretch, Gardiner widened his lead, with Kerley the next best to chase. From far back, Zambrano was in another gear, speeding past Cedenio, James and a metre before the line, Kerley.

Gardiner's win in 43.48 is the sixth fastest time in history. Zambrano's 44.15 set the South American record, beating Sanderlei Parrela's record from the World Championships 20 years earlier.

== Records ==
Before the competition records were as follows:

| Record | Athlete | Perf. | Location | Date |
|---|---|---|---|---|
| World Record | Wayde van Niekerk (RSA) | 43.03 | Rio de Janeiro, Brazil | 14 August 2016 |
| Championship Record | Michael Johnson (USA) | 43.18 | Sevilla, Spain | 26 August 1999 |
| World Leading | Michael Norman (USA) | 43.45 | Torrance, United States | 20 April 2019 |
| African Record | Wayde van Niekerk (RSA) | 43.03 | Rio de Janeiro, Brazil | 14 August 2016 |
| Asian Record | Youssef Ahmad Masrahi (KSA) | 43.93 | Beijing, China | 23 August 2015 |
| North, Central American and Caribbean Record | Michael Johnson (USA) | 43.18 | Seville, Spain | 26 August 1999 |
| South American Record | Sanderlei Claro Parrela (BRA) | 44.29 | Seville, Spain | 26 August 1999 |
| European Record | Thomas Schönlebe (GDR) | 44.33 | Rome, Italy | 3 September 1987 |
| Oceanian Record | Darren Clark (AUS) | 44.38 | Seoul, South Korea | 26 September 1988 |

The following records were set at the competition:

| Record | Perf. | Athlete | Nat. | Date |
|---|---|---|---|---|
| Malagasy | 46.80 | Todiasoa Rabearison | MAD | 1 Oct 2019 |
| Gibraltarian | 47.41 | Jessy Franco | GIB | 1 Oct 2019 |
| Colombian | 44.55 | Anthony Zambrano | COL | 2 Oct 2019 |
| Bahamian | 43.48 | Steven Gardiner | BAH | 4 Oct 2019 |
| South American | 44.15 | Anthony Zambrano | COL | 4 Oct 2019 |
| Colombian | 44.15 | Anthony Zambrano | COL | 4 Oct 2019 |

== Qualification standard ==
The standard to qualify automatically for entry was 45.30.

== Schedule ==
The event schedule, in local time (UTC+3), was as follows:

| Date | Time | Round |
|---|---|---|
| 1 October | 16:35 | Heats |
| 2 October | 20:35 | Semi-finals |
| 4 October | 22:20 | Final |

== Results ==
=== Heats ===
The first three in each heat (Q) and the next six fastest (q) qualified for the semifinal.

| Rank | Heat | Lane | Name | Nationality | Time | Notes |
|---|---|---|---|---|---|---|
| 1 | 2 | 2 | Kirani James | Grenada | 44.94 | Q |
| 2 | 4 | 7 | Michael Norman | United States | 45.00 | Q |
| 3 | 4 | 5 | Demish Gaye | Jamaica | 45.02 | Q |
| 4 | 6 | 7 | Emmanuel Korir | Kenya | 45.08 | Q |
| 5 | 3 | 4 | Davide Re | Italy | 45.08 | Q |
| 6 | 4 | 3 | Leungo Scotch | Botswana | 45.10 | Q, PB |
| 7 | 2 | 8 | Julian Walsh | Japan | 45.14 | Q, PB |
| 8 | 3 | 3 | Fred Kerley | United States | 45.19 | Q |
| 9 | 1 | 3 | Machel Cedenio | Trinidad and Tobago | 45.26 | Q |
| 10 | 6 | 6 | Jonathan Sacoor | Belgium | 45.32 | Q |
| 11 | 1 | 4 | Akeem Bloomfield | Jamaica | 45.34 | Q |
| 12 | 6 | 5 | Rabah Yousif | Great Britain & N.I. | 45.40 | Q |
| 13 | 1 | 8 | Thapelo Phora | South Africa | 45.45 | Q |
| 14 | 3 | 7 | Abbas Abubakar Abbas | Bahrain | 45.47 | Q |
| 15 | 2 | 3 | Vernon Norwood | United States | 45.59 | Q |
| 16 | 6 | 8 | Jhon Perlaza | Colombia | 45.62 | q |
| 17 | 1 | 5 | Alphas Kishoyian | Kenya | 45.65 | q |
| 18 | 5 | 3 | Steven Gardiner | Bahamas | 45.68 | Q |
| 19 | 3 | 8 | Mazen Al-Yassin | Saudi Arabia | 45.70 | q |
| 20 | 6 | 3 | Nathan Strother | United States | 45.71 | q |
| 21 | 4 | 4 | Yousef Karam | Kuwait | 45.74 | q |
| 22 | 2 | 7 | Steven Solomon | Australia | 45.82 | q |
| 23 | 2 | 6 | Derrick Mokaleng | South Africa | 45.87 | |
| 24 | 5 | 5 | Philip Osei | Canada | 45.87 | Q |
| 25 | 4 | 2 | Alonzo Russell | Bahamas | 45.91 | |
| 26 | 5 | 6 | Anthony Zambrano | Colombia | 45.93 | Q |
| 27 | 1 | 6 | Lucas Carvalho | Brazil | 46.01 | |
| 28 | 5 | 7 | Ditiro Nzamani | Botswana | 46.19 | |
| 29 | 5 | 2 | Rusheen McDonald | Jamaica | 46.21 | |
| 30 | 3 | 2 | Mikhail Litvin | Kazakhstan | 46.28 | |
| 31 | 6 | 4 | Taha Hussein Yaseen | Iraq | 46.58 | |
| 32 | 4 | 6 | Todiasoa Rabearison | Madagascar | 46.80 | NR |
| 33 | 2 | 4 | Luka Janežič | Slovenia | 46.84 | |
| 34 | 5 | 4 | Brandon Parris | Saint Vincent and the Grenadines | 47.39 | |
| 35 | 6 | 2 | Jessy Franco | Gibraltar | 47.41 | NR |
| 36 | 3 | 5 | Bachir Mahamat | Chad | 47.65 | |
| 37 | 1 | 2 | Abdalelah Haroun | Qatar | 47.76 | SB |
| 38 | 3 | 6 | Jovan Stojoski | North Macedonia | 47.92 | |
| 39 | 4 | 8 | Moussa Zaroumeye | Niger | 48.13 | |
| 40 | 5 | 8 | Mohammad Jahir Rayhan | Bangladesh | 48.48 | |
| 41 | 2 | 5 | Tikie Terry Mael | Vanuatu | 48.52 | PB |
| | 1 | 7 | Matthew Hudson-Smith | Great Britain & N.I. | DNF | |

=== Semi-finals ===
The first two in each heat (Q) and the next two fastest (q) qualified for the final.

| Rank | Heat | Lane | Name | Nationality | Time | Notes |
|---|---|---|---|---|---|---|
| 1 | 2 | 6 | Steven Gardiner | Bahamas | 44.13 | Q, SB |
| 2 | 2 | 5 | Kirani James | Grenada | 44.23 | Q, SB |
| 3 | 1 | 4 | Fred Kerley | United States | 44.25 | Q |
| 4 | 1 | 5 | Emmanuel Korir | Kenya | 44.37 | Q, SB |
| 5 | 3 | 7 | Machel Cedenio | Trinidad and Tobago | 44.41 | Q, SB |
| 6 | 3 | 8 | Anthony Zambrano | Colombia | 44.55 | Q, NR |
| 7 | 2 | 7 | Demish Gaye | Jamaica | 44.66 | q, SB |
| 8 | 3 | 6 | Akeem Bloomfield | Jamaica | 44.77 | q |
| 9 | 1 | 7 | Davide Re | Italy | 44.85 | |
| 10 | 2 | 9 | Vernon Norwood | United States | 45.00 | |
| 11 | 2 | 8 | Leungo Scotch | Botswana | 45.00 | PB |
| 12 | 1 | 6 | Jonathan Sacoor | Belgium | 45.03 | =PB |
| 13 | 3 | 5 | Julian Walsh | Japan | 45.13 | PB |
| 14 | 3 | 9 | Rabah Yousif | Great Britain & N.I. | 45.15 | PB |
| 15 | 2 | 3 | Jhon Perlaza | Colombia | 45.17 | |
| 16 | 1 | 9 | Thapelo Phora | South Africa | 45.24 | |
| 17 | 1 | 8 | Abbas Abubakar Abbas | Bahrain | 45.26 | |
| 18 | 1 | 2 | Nathan Strother | United States | 45.34 | |
| 19 | 2 | 4 | Philip Osei | Canada | 45.44 | |
| 20 | 2 | 2 | Steven Solomon | Australia | 45.54 | SB |
| 21 | 3 | 2 | Alphas Kishoyian | Kenya | 45.55 | |
| 22 | 3 | 4 | Michael Norman | United States | 45.94 | |
| 23 | 1 | 3 | Mazen Al-Yassin | Saudi Arabia | 46.11 | |
| | 3 | 3 | Yousef Karam | Kuwait | DNF | |

=== Final ===
The final was started on 4 October at 22:20.

| Rank | Lane | Name | Nationality | Time | Notes |
|---|---|---|---|---|---|
| 1st place, gold medalist(s) | 4 | Steven Gardiner | Bahamas | 43.48 | NR |
| 2nd place, silver medalist(s) | 8 | Anthony Zambrano | Colombia | 44.15 | AR |
| 3rd place, bronze medalist(s) | 5 | Fred Kerley | United States | 44.17 | |
| 4 | 3 | Demish Gaye | Jamaica | 44.46 | PB |
| 5 | 7 | Kirani James | Grenada | 44.54 | |
| 6 | 9 | Emmanuel Korir | Kenya | 44.94 | |
| 7 | 6 | Machel Cedenio | Trinidad and Tobago | 45.30 | |
| 8 | 2 | Akeem Bloomfield | Jamaica | 45.36 | |
