= 2023 Asian Athletics Championships – Men's 400 metres =

Men's 400 metres at the 2023 Asian Athletics Championships
- Venue: National Stadium
- Location: Bangkok, Thailand
- Dates: 12 July (heats & semi-finals); 13 July (final)
- Competitors: 26 from 18 nations
- Winning time: 45.00

Medalists
gold medal	Kentaro Sato	Japan
silver medal	Fuga Sato	Japan
bronze medal	Youssef Masrahi	Saudi Arabia

The men's 400 metres event at the 2023 Asian Athletics Championships was held on 12 and 13 July.

== Records ==
Records before the 2023 Asian Athletics Championships
Record	Athlete (nation)	Time (s)	Location	Date
World record	Wayde Van Niekerk (RSA)	43.03	Rio de Janeiro, Brazil	14 August 2016
Asian record	Yousef Masrahi (KSA)	43.93	Beijing, China	23 August 2015
Championship record	Sugath Thilakaratne (SRI)	44.61	Fukuoka, Japan	20 July 1998
World leading	Muzala Samukonga (ZMB)	43.91	Gaborone, Botswana	29 April 2023
Asian leading	Ashraf Osman (QAT)	45.01	Marrakesh, Morocco	21 June 2023

== Results ==
=== Heats ===
Held on 12 July. First 3 in each heat (Q) and the next 4 fastest (q) qualified for the semi-finals.

==== Heat 1 ====
Rank	Athlete	Nation	Time	Notes
1	Ashraf Hussen Osman	Qatar	46.22	Q
2	Youssef Masrahi	Saudi Arabia	46.34	Q
3	Rajitha Niranjan Rajakaruna	Sri Lanka	46.52	Q
4	Umajesty Williams	Philippines	47.55	
5	Mueed Abdul	Pakistan	48.18	
6	Nguyễn Tùng Lâm	Vietnam	48.59	
—	Lucky Yooyamadu	Thailand	DQ	

==== Heat 2 ====
Rank	Athlete	Nation	Time	Notes
1	Fuga Sato	Japan	45.97	Q
2	Ammar Ismail Yahya Ibrahim	Qatar	46.27	Q
3	Joshua Atkinson	Thailand	46.74	Q
4	Frederick Ramirez	Philippines	46.77	q
5	Yefim Tarassov	Kazakhstan	47.27	q
6	Hamza Abdullah Al-Jabri	Oman	47.49	q
7	Dilshodbek Boboqulov	Uzbekistan	48.80	

==== Heat 3 ====
Rank	Athlete	Nation	Time	Notes
1	Muhammad Ajmal	India	46.06	Q
2	Kentaro Sato	Japan	46.08	Q
3	Umar Osman	Malaysia	46.72	Q
4	Sarawut Nuansri	Thailand	47.55	
5	Thiruben Thana Rajan	Singapore	47.69	
6	Kumal Som Bahadur	Nepal	48.33	PB
7	Adam Riffath	Maldives	50.67	PB

==== Heat 4 ====
Rank	Athlete	Nation	Time	Notes
1	Rajesh Ramesh	India	46.45	Q
2	Aruna Darshana	Sri Lanka	46.56	Q
3	Mikhail Litvin	Kazakhstan	46.86	Q
4	Kim Ui-Yeon	South Korea	47.52	q
5	Trần Đình Sơn	Vietnam	47.85	
6	Zubin Percy Muncherji	Singapore	47.97	
7	Mohamad Mortada	Lebanon	48.62	
8	Abdul Rasheed Ismail	Maldives	50.72	PB

=== Semi-finals ===
Held on 12 July. First 3 in each heat (Q) and the next 2 fastest (q) qualified for the final.

==== Heat 1 ====
Rank	Athlete	Nation	Time	Notes
1	Fuga Sato	Japan	45.61	Q
2	Aruna Darshana	Sri Lanka	45.79	Q
3	Rajesh Ramesh	India	45.91	Q
4	Umar Osman	Malaysia	46.42	
5	Frederick Ramirez	Philippines	46.53	PB
6	Mikhail Litvin	Kazakhstan	46.74	
7	Kim Ui-yeon	South Korea	47.58	
—	Ammar Ismail Yahya Ibrahim	Qatar	DNF	

==== Heat 2 ====
Rank	Athlete	Nation	Time	Notes
1	Kentaro Sato	Japan	45.64	Q
2	Youssef Masrahi	Saudi Arabia	45.66	Q
3	Ashraf Hussen Osman	Qatar	45.66	Q
4	Muhammad Ajmal	India	45.76	q
5	Rajitha Niranjan Rajakaruna	Sri Lanka	46.12	q, PB
6	Joshua Atkinson	Thailand	46.43	
7	Yefim Tarassov	Kazakhstan	47.04	
8	Hamza Abdullah Al-Jabri	Oman	47.45	

=== Final ===
Held on 13 July.

Rank	Lane	Athlete	Nation	Time	Notes
1st place, gold medalist(s)	6	Kentaro Sato	Japan	45.00	PB
2nd place, silver medalist(s)	5	Fuga Sato	Japan	45.13	PB
3rd place, bronze medalist(s)	4	Youssef Masrahi	Saudi Arabia	45.19	SB
4	1	Muhammad Ajmal	India	45.36	PB
5	7	Ashraf Hussen Osman	Qatar	45.61	
6	8	Rajesh Ramesh	India	45.67	PB
7	3	Aruna Darshana	Sri Lanka	45.69	
8	2	Rajitha Niranjan Rajakaruna	Sri Lanka	46.60	
