= Athletics at the 2022 Asian Games – Men's 4 × 400 metres relay =

2022 Asian Games

Men's 4 × 400 metres relay at the 2022 Asian Games
- Venue: Hangzhou Olympic Expo Main Stadium
- Date: 3–4 October 2023
- Competitors: 51 from 12 nations

Medalists
gold medal	India; Muhammed Anas, Amoj Jacob, Muhammad Ajmal Variyathodi, Rajesh Ramesh, Nihal William, Mijo Chacko Kurian
silver medal	Qatar; Abderrahman Samba, Ashraf Osman, Ismail Abakar, Bassem Hemeida, Ammar Ibrahim, Amar Ebed
bronze medal	Sri Lanka; Aruna Darshana, Pabasara Niku, Rajitha Rajakaruna, Kalinga Kumarage, Dinuka Deshan, Pasindu Kodikara

The men's 4 × 400 metres relay competition at the 2022 Asian Games took place on 3 and 4 October 2023 at the HOC Stadium, Hangzhou.

== Schedule ==
All times are China Standard Time (UTC+08:00)

Date	Time	Event
Tuesday, 3 October 2023	09:40	Round 1
Wednesday, 4 October 2023	20:35	Final

== Records ==
Prior to this competition, the existing world, Asian and Games records were as follows.

World Record	United States	2:54.29	Stuttgart, Germany	22 August 1993
Asian Record	India	2:59.05	Budapest, Hungary	26 August 2023
Games Record	Qatar	3:00.56	Jakarta, Indonesia	30 August 2018

== Results ==
Legend

- DNS — Did not start
- DSQ — Disqualified

=== Round 1 ===
- Qualification: First 3 in each heat (Q) and the next 2 fastest (q) advance to the final.

==== Heat 1 ====
Rank	Team	Time	Notes
1	India (IND); Muhammed Anas; Nihal William; Amoj Jacob; Mijo Chacko Kurian	3:03.81	Q
2	Qatar (QAT); Ammar Ibrahim; Ashraf Osman; Amar Ebed; Ismail Abakar	3:05.92	Q
3	Thailand (THA); Apisit Chamsri; Thawatchai Himaiad; Jirayu Pleenaram; Sarawut Nuansi	3:06.96	Q
4	Iraq (IRQ); Taha Hussein; Mohammed Al-Baqer; Mohammed Abdul-Ridha; Yasir Ali	3:07.58	q
5	Singapore (SGP); Ng Chin Hui; Calvin Quek; Zubin Muncherji; Thiruben Thana Rajan	3:13.22	
—	Saudi Arabia (KSA) — — — —	DNS	

==== Heat 2 ====
Rank	Team	Time	Notes
1	Philippines (PHI); Umajesty Williams; Frederick Ramirez; Joyme Sequita; Mico del Prado	3:06.15	Q
2	Sri Lanka (SRI); Dinuka Deshan; Pabasara Niku; Rajitha Rajakaruna; Pasindu Kodikara	3:06.60	Q
3	South Korea (KOR); Kim Ui-yeon; Joo Seung-kyun; Lee Do-ha; Shin Min-kyu	3:07.10	Q
4	Bahrain (BRN); Musa Isah; Abbas Yusuf Ali; Husain Mohamed Al-Doseri; Abbas Abubakar Abbas	3:07.38	q
—	Chinese Taipei (TPE); Chen Jian-rong; Wu Yen-ming; Lin Chung-wei; Yu Chen-yi	DSQ	
—	Mongolia (MGL); Erdenebatyn Turtogtokh; Otgontögsiin Zulkhüü; Narandulamyn Mönkhbayar; Naraugiin Jandos	DSQ	

=== Final ===
Rank	Team	Time	Notes
1st place, gold medalist(s)	India (IND); Muhammed Anas; Amoj Jacob; Muhammad Ajmal Variyathodi; Rajesh Ramesh	3:01.58	
2nd place, silver medalist(s)	Qatar (QAT); Abderrahman Samba; Ashraf Osman; Ismail Abakar; Bassem Hemeida	3:02.05	
3rd place, bronze medalist(s)	Sri Lanka (SRI); Aruna Darshana; Pabasara Niku; Rajitha Rajakaruna; Kalinga Kumarage	3:02.55	
4	Thailand (THA); Sarawut Nuansi; Thawatchai Himaiad; Jirayu Pleenaram; Joshua Atkinson	3:04.23	
5	Philippines (PHI); Umajesty Williams; Frederick Ramirez; Joyme Sequita; Mico del Prado	3:04.89	
6	South Korea (KOR); Kim Ui-yeon; Joo Seung-kyun; Lee Do-ha; Shin Min-kyu	3:05.89	
—	Iraq (IRQ); Yasir Ali; Mohammed Abdul-Ridha; Mohammed Al-Baqer; Taha Hussein	DSQ	
—	Bahrain (BRN) — — — —	DNS	
