= 2015 Asian Athletics Championships – Men's 400 metres =

The men's 400 metres event at the 2015 Asian Athletics Championships was held on the 3 and 4 of June.

== Medalists ==
Gold	Abdelalelah Haroun; Qatar
Silver	Yousef Masrahi; Saudi Arabia
Bronze	Kentaro Sato; Japan

== Results ==
=== Heats ===
First 2 in each heat (Q) and the next 2 fastest (q) qualified for the final.

Rank	Heat	Name	Nationality	Time	Notes
1	2	Abdelalelah Haroun	Qatar	45.96	Q
2	3	Yousef Masrahi	Saudi Arabia	46.11	Q
3	3	Abubakar Abbas	Bahrain	46.41	Q
4	2	Kentaro Sato	Japan	46.55	Q
4	3	Arokya Rajeev	India	46.55	q
6	1	Takamasa Kitagawa	Japan	46.71	Q
7	3	Sajjad Hashemi	Iran	46.73	q
8	3	Ahmed Mubarak Salah	Oman	46.90	
9	2	Mao Guorong	China	47.07	
10	1	Mehdi Zamani	Iran	47.08	Q
11	1	Mikhail Litvin	Kazakhstan	47.18	
12	2	Sergey Zaikov	Kazakhstan	47.51	
13	3	Fang Yuan	China	47.52	
14	1	Kalinga Hewakumarage	Sri Lanka	47.56	
15	1	Zhu Chenbin	China	47.74	
16	3	Chan Ka Chun	Hong Kong	47.90	
17	2	Mazen Al-Yasen	Saudi Arabia	47.92	
18	2	Aleksander Pronzhenko	Tajikistan	47.96	
19	1	Mohamed Hindi	Oman	48.10	
20	1	Kim Ui-yeon	South Korea	48.12	
21	1	Yang Lung-Hsiang	Chinese Taipei	48.30	
22	2	Wang Wei-hsu	Chinese Taipei	48.32	
23	1	Leung King Hung	Hong Kong	48.88	
	3	Yousef Karam	Kuwait	DNS	

=== Final ===
Rank	Lane	Name	Nationality	Result	Notes
1st place, gold medalist(s)	4	Abdelalelah Haroun	Qatar	44.68	
2nd place, silver medalist(s)	5	Yousef Masrahi	Saudi Arabia	45.14	
3rd place, bronze medalist(s)	8	Kentaro Sato	Japan	46.09	
4	3	Abubakar Abbas	Bahrain	46.15	
5	6	Takamasa Kitagawa	Japan	46.33	
6	2	Sajjad Hashemi	Iran	46.62	
7	1	Arokya Rajeev	India	46.65	
8	7	Mehdi Zamani	Iran	47.01	
