= Kalinga Kumarage =

Sri Lankan sprinter (born 1992)

Personal information
- Full name: Kalinga Hewa Kumarage
- Born: 25 September 1992 (age 34) Colombo, Sri Lanka
- Height: 1.65 m (5 ft 5 in)
- Military career
- Branch: Sri Lanka Army
- Rank: Warrant Officer II
- Unit: Electrical and Mechanical Engineers

Sport
- Sport: Athletics
- Event: 400 m

Achievements and titles
- Personal best: 45.07 (2023)
Medal record
Men's athletics
Representing Sri Lanka
Asian Games
Bronze medal – third place	2022 Hangzhou	4×400m
Asian Championships
Gold medal – first place	2023 Bangkok	4×400m
Silver medal – second place	2017 Bhubaneswar	4×400m
Silver medal – second place	2023 Bangkok	4×400m mixed
Bronze medal – third place	2025 Gumi	400m
Bronze medal – third place	2025 Gumi	4×400m mixed
Asian Relays
Bronze medal – third place	2026 Shaoxing	4×400m
South Asian Games
Silver medal – second place	2016 Guwahati	4×400m
South Asian Championships
Gold medal – first place	2025 Ranchi	400m
Gold medal – first place	2025 Ranchi	4x400m
Silver medal – second place	2025 Ranchi	4x400m mixed

Kalinga Hewa Kumarage (born 25 September 1992) is a Sri Lankan sprinter who specializes in 400 m events.

== Career ==
Kumarage made his first international appearance at the 2014 Asian Games, where the Sri Lankan 4 × 400 m relay team was eliminated in the heats.

In 2015, he finished fifth in the relay at the 2015 Asian Championships, and was eliminated in the heats of the 400 m with a time of 47.56.

At the 2016 South Asian Games, he won a silver medal in the 4 × 400 m relay behind India.

He then won the silver medal in the men's 4 × 400 m relay at the 2017 Asian Championships with a time of 3:04.80.

At the 2018 Asian Games, he finished eighth in the 400 m in 46.49 and fourth in the relay (3:02.74).

At the 2022 Commonwealth Games, he was eliminated in the semifinals of the 400 m (47.00).

In 2023, he won the gold medal in the men's 4×400 metres relay at the 2023 Asian Championships with a time of 3:01.56, setting a new championship and national record together with Aruna Dharshana, Rajitha Neranjan Rajakaruna and Pabasara Niku. He also won silver in the mixed relay (3:15.41) with Tharushi Karunarathna and Nadeesha Ramanayake.

At the 2023 World Championships in Budapest, his relay team ran 3:03.25 minutes and missed the final. Later that year, he finished seventh in the 400 metres (46.22 s) at the 2022 Asian Games, and the mixed relay team was disqualified. However, he won the bronze medal in the men's 4 × 400 m relay (3:02.55) with teammates Dharshana, Niku, and Rajakaruna.

At the 2025 World Indoor Championships, he placed sixth in the relay (3:10.58). In May 2025, at the 2025 Asian Championships in Gumi, he won bronze in the 400 metres (45.55) behind Ammar Ismail Yahia Ibrahim and Kentarō Satō, and another bronze in the mixed relay (3:21.95) with Sadew Vimansa Rajakaruna, Lakshima Mendis, and Harshani Fernando. The men's relay team finished fifth (3:08.55).

At the 2026 Asian Relays Championships in Shaoxing, China, Kumarage was a member of the men's 4 × 400 m relay team that won the bronze medal with a timing of 3:03.33. He also finished fourth in the mixed 4 × 400 m relay.
