= 2018 IAAF World Indoor Championships – Men's 400 metres =

Men's 400 metres at the 2018 IAAF World Indoor Championships
- Venue: Arena Birmingham
- Dates: 2–3 March
- Competitors: 47 from 35 nations
- Winning time: 45.47

Medalists
gold medal	Pavel Maslák	Czech Republic
silver medal	Michael Cherry	United States
bronze medal	Deon Lendore	Trinidad and Tobago

Video on YouTube Official Video

The men's 400 metres at the 2018 IAAF World Indoor Championships took place on 2 and 3 March 2018.

== Summary ==
For the first time ever in a World Championship, every runner in a single preliminary heat was disqualified. It was the third heat, where first returning silver medalist Abdalelah Haroun false started himself out of the heat. #5 runner of all time Bralon Taplin won the heat, but he and the other three remaining runners Austris Karpinskis, Alonzo Russell and Steven Gayle were then disqualified for lane violations.

2012 Champion Nery Brenes also found himself disqualified after winning the fifth heat. With two place qualifiers missing, it opened the door for Juander Santos and Mikhail Litvin to take the extra time qualification positions in the semi-final round.

In the final, Óscar Husillos from lane 6 was first to the break line and took the lead with a lap to go, holding the lead to cross the finish line first in a time of 44.92. However, Husillos and Luguelín Santos were disqualified for lane violations, giving Pavel Maslák his third consecutive championship, Michael Cherry the silver, and Deon Lendore the bronze.

== Results ==
=== Heats ===
The heats were started on 2 March at 11:20.

Rank	Heat	Lane	Name	Nationality	Time	Notes
1	2	6	Luka Janežič	Slovenia	46.45	Q
2	6	5	Óscar Husillos	Spain	46.51	Q
3	1	5	Jakub Krzewina	Poland	46.57	Q
4	1	6	Deon Lendore	Trinidad and Tobago	46.68	Q
5	5	6	Aldrich Bailey	United States	46.77	Q
6	6	6	Pavel Maslák	Czech Republic	46.80	Q
7	5	5	Lee Thompson	Great Britain	46.81	Q
8	6	3	Luguelín Santos	Dominican Republic	46.83	q
9	6	4	Yousef Karam	Kuwait	46.86	q
10	2	5	Javon Francis	Jamaica	46.87	Q
11	2	4	Chidi Okezie	Nigeria	46.91	q
12	2	3	Asa Guevara	Trinidad and Tobago	46.92	q
13	1	3	Lucas Búa	Spain	46.96	q
14	5	4	Patrik Šorm	Czech Republic	46.99	q
15	4	5	Michael Cherry	United States	46.99	Q
16	1	4	Juander Santos	Dominican Republic	47.02	q
17	4	6	Rafał Omelko	Poland	47.13	Q
18	4	3	Mikhail Litvin	Kazakhstan	47.16	q
19	4	4	Vitalii Butrym	Ukraine	47.45	
20	1	2	Michael Anthony Rasmijn	Aruba	49.20	NR
21	6	1	Davron Atabaev	Tajikistan	49.20	SB
22	2	1	Kelvin Delvin Ramírez	Nicaragua	49.88	SB
23	2	2	Tikie Terry Mael	Vanuatu	49.92	PB
24	4	2	Mohamed Naail	Maldives	49.98	NR
25	6	2	Narek Ghukasyan	Armenia	51.02	PB
	3	5	Abdalelah Haroun	Qatar	DQ	162.8
	3	6	Bralon Taplin	Grenada	DQ	163.3(a)
	3	2	Austris Karpinskis	Latvia	DQ	163.3(a)
	3	4	Alonzo Russell	Bahamas	DQ	163.3(a)
	3	3	Steven Gayle	Jamaica	DQ	163.3(a)
	5	3	Nery Brenes	Costa Rica	DQ	163.3(a)
	5	2	Mazen Alyasen	Saudi Arabia	DNS	

=== Semifinal ===
The semifinals were started on 2 March at 21:06.

Rank	Heat	Lane	Name	Nationality	Time	Notes
1	2	5	Óscar Husillos	Spain	45.69	Q
2	2	6	Michael Cherry	United States	45.73	Q
3	1	3	Luguelín Santos	Dominican Republic	46.31	Q, SB
4	3	4	Pavel Maslák	Czech Republic	46.32	Q
5	1	6	Aldrich Bailey	United States	46.33	Q
6	3	6	Deon Lendore	Trinidad and Tobago	46.33	Q
7	3	5	Luka Janežič	Slovenia	46.37	
8	2	4	Rafał Omelko	Poland	46.39	
9	1	5	Jakub Krzewina	Poland	46.69	
10	1	4	Javon Francis	Jamaica	46.73	
11	2	2	Juander Santos	Dominican Republic	46.83	PB
12	2	1	Asa Guevara	Trinidad and Tobago	46.91	
13	1	2	Patrik Šorm	Czech Republic	47.04	
14	2	3	Lee Thompson	Great Britain	47.14	
15	1	1	Lucas Búa	Spain	47.14	
16	3	1	Mikhail Litvin	Kazakhstan	47.94	
17	3	2	Chidi Okezie	Nigeria	48.53	
	3	3	Yousef Karam	Kuwait	DNF	

=== Final ===
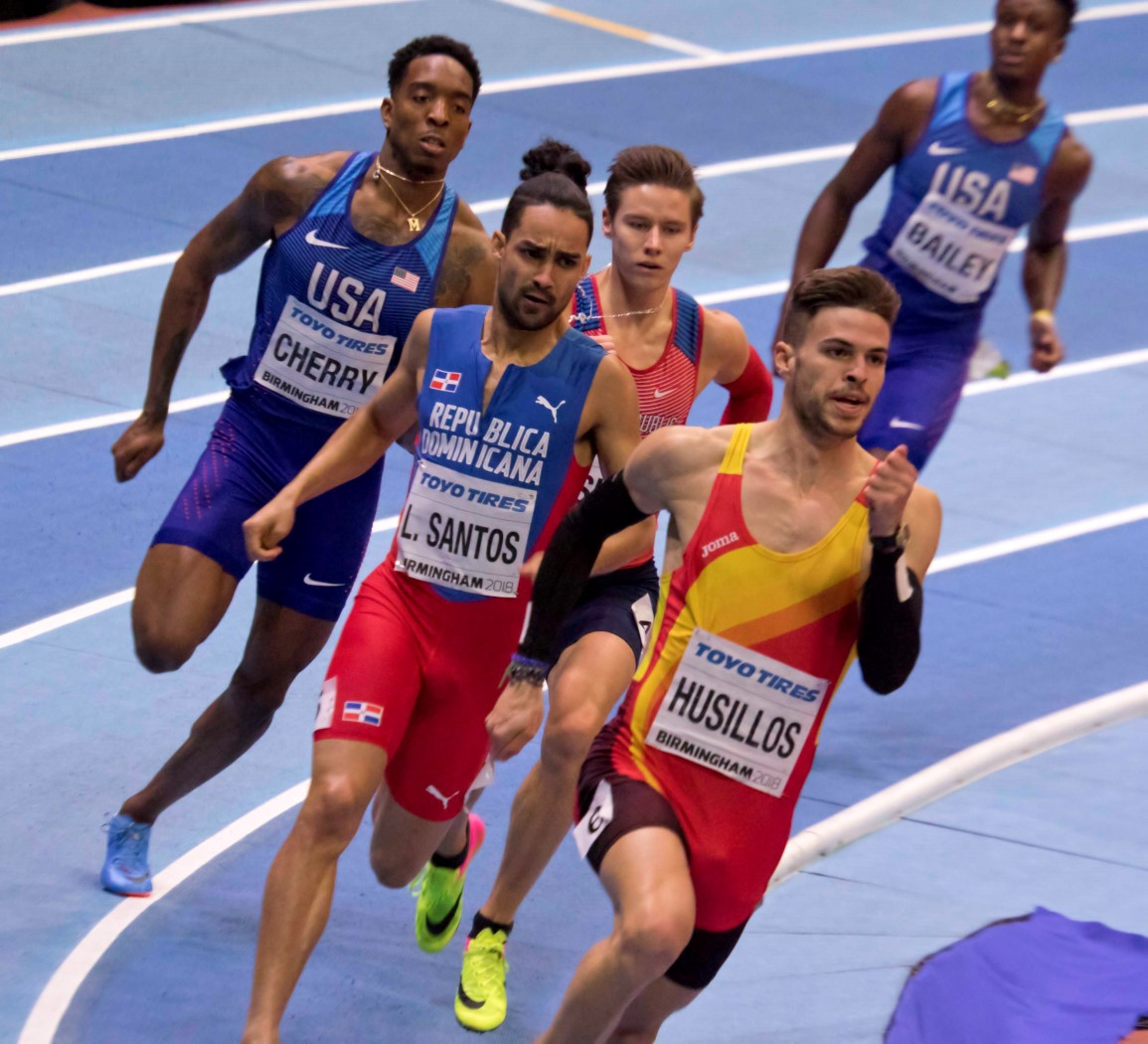
The final underway

The final was started on 3 March at 20:20.

Rank	Name	Nationality	Time	Notes
1st place, gold medalist(s)	Pavel Maslák	Czech Republic	45.47	SB
2nd place, silver medalist(s)	Michael Cherry	United States	45.84	
3rd place, bronze medalist(s)	Deon Lendore	Trinidad and Tobago	46.37	
4	Aldrich Bailey	United States	46.44	
	Óscar Husillos	Spain	DQ	163.3(b)
	Luguelín Santos	Dominican Republic	DQ	163.3(b)
