= Botswana at the 2019 World Athletics Championships =

- WA code: BOT

in Doha, Qatar 27 September - 6 October 2019
- Competitors: 6 in 3 events

World Athletics Championships appearances
- 1983; 1987; 1991; 1993; 1995; 1997; 1999; 2001; 2003; 2005; 2007; 2009; 2011; 2013; 2015; 2017; 2019; 2022; 2023; 2025

Botswana competed at the 2019 World Athletics Championships in Doha, Qatar, from 27 September - 6 October 2019. The country sent 6 athletes to compete in 3 events. Leungo Scotch had the best performance for Botswana, as he broke a personal best in the Men's 400 meters semifinal.

== Results ==
Key

- Q = Qualified for the next round
- q = Qualified for the next round as a fastest loser or, in field events, by position without achieving the qualifying target
- DQ = Disqualifief
- DNF = Did not finish
- NR = National record
- PB = Personal best
- SB = Season best
- N/A = Round not applicable for the event

=== Men ===
==== Track and Road events ====
Athlete	Event	Heat		Semifinal		Final	
Athlete	Event	Result	Rank	Result	Rank	Result	Rank
Leungo Scotch	400 m	45.10 PB	6 Q	45.00 PB	11	Did not advance	
Ditiro Nzamani	400 m	46.19	28	Did not advance			
Zibane Ngozi; Ditiro Nzamani; Onkabetse Nkobolo; Leungo Scotch	4x400 m relay	DQ		Did not advance			

=== Women ===
==== Track and Road events ====
Athlete	Event	Heat		Semifinal		Final	
Athlete	Event	Result	Rank	Result	Rank	Result	Rank
Galefele Moroko	400 m	50.59 PB	2 Q	DNF		Did not advance	
Christine Botlogetswe	400 m	53.27	42	Did not advance			
