= Abderrahman Samba =

Qatari hurdler (born 1995)

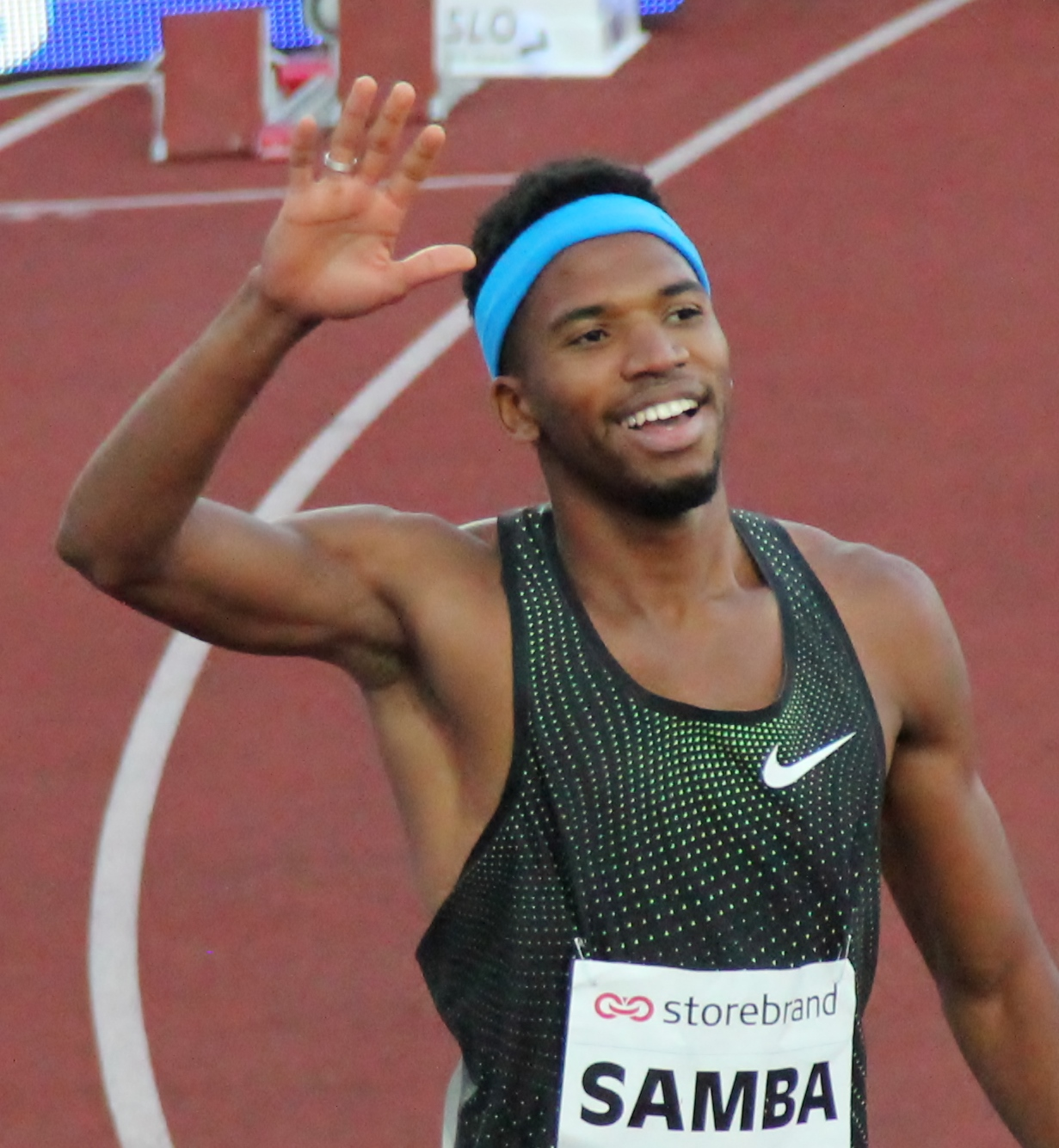
- Samba in 2018

Personal information
- Nationality: Qatari
- Born: 5 September 1995 (age 31) Saudi Arabia

Sport
- Country: Qatar
- Sport: Athletics
- Event: Hurdling
Medal record
World Championships
Bronze medal – third place	2019 Doha	400 m hurdles
Bronze medal – third place	2025 Tokyo	400 m hurdles
Asian Games
Gold medal – first place	2018 Jakarta–Palembang	400 m hurdles
Gold medal – first place	2018 Jakarta–Palembang	4 × 400 m relay
Gold medal – first place	2022 Hangzhou	400 m hurdles
Silver medal – second place	2022 Hangzhou	4 × 400 m relay
Asian Championships
Gold medal – first place	2019 Doha	400 m hurdles
Gold medal – first place	2025 Gumi	400 m hurdles
Gold medal – first place	2025 Gumi	4 × 400 m relay
Bronze medal – third place	2019 Doha	4 × 400 m relay
Asian Indoor Championships
Gold medal – first place	2018 Tehran	4 × 400 m relay
Arab Championships
Gold medal – first place	2025 Oran	400 m hurdles
Continental Cup
Gold medal – first place	2018 Ostrava	400 m hurdles

Abderrahman Almoubarrake Samba Alsaleck (born 5 September 1995) is a Qatari male track and field athlete who specialises in the 400 metres hurdles. He was born and raised in Saudi Arabia but chose to represent Mauritania – his father's homeland – before eventually switching allegiance to Qatar and moving to Doha in 2015. He became eligible to compete for his adopted country in May 2016. He was the second person to run the 400 m hurdle event in less than 47 seconds.

Samba placed seventh at the 2017 World Championships in Athletics on his global debut. He appeared suddenly on the elite athletics scene, having run modest sprint times in 2016 before winning the 400 m hurdles race at the Qatar leg of the 2017 IAAF Diamond League, beating Olympic champion Kerron Clement. He ranked eighth in the world that season with his new personal best of 48.31 seconds.

In February 2018, he won a 4 × 400 metres relay gold medal with a Qatari team of Mohamed Nasir Abbas, Mohamed El Nour and Abdalelah Haroun at the Asian Indoor Athletics Championships. Then, in the Summer season, he ran the 400 m hurdles in 46.98, the second fastest time ever, at the Meeting de Paris. and won two gold medal at the Asian Games in Indonesia in 400 metres hurdles and 4 × 400 metres relay.

In April 2019, he won the gold medal in the 2019 Asian Athletics Championships in 400 hurdles and, after being injured through Summer, in October the bronze medal at the World Athletics Championships. He was elected best athlete in Asia at the end of the year.

== International competitions ==
Year	Competition	Venue	Position	Event	Notes
2017	World Championships	London, United Kingdom	7th	400 m hurdles	49.74
2018	Asian Indoor Championships	Tehran, Iran	1st	4 × 400 m relay	3:10.08
2018	Asian Games	Jakarta, Indonesia	1st	400 m hurdles	47.66; GR
2018	Asian Games	Jakarta, Indonesia	1st	4 × 400 metres relay	3:00.56; AR
2018	IAAF Continental Cup	Ostrava, Czech Republic	1st	400 m hurdles	47.37 =CR
2019	Asian Championships	Doha, Qatar	1st	400 m hurdles	47.51; CR
2019	World Championships	Doha, Qatar	3rd	400 m hurdles	48.03
2021	Olympic Games	Tokyo, Japan	5th	400 m hurdles	47.12
2023	Asian Games	Hangzhou, China	1st	400 m hurdles	48.04
2023	Asian Games	Hangzhou, China	2nd	4 × 400 m relay	3:02.05
2024	Olympic Games	Paris, France	6th	400 m hurdles	47.98
2025	Arab Championships	Oran, Algeria	1st	400 m hurdles	48.77
2025	Asian Championships	Gumi, South Korea	1st	400 m hurdles	48.00
2025	Asian Championships	Gumi, South Korea	1st	4 × 400 m relay	3:03.52
2025	World Championships	Tokyo, Japan	3rd	400 m hurdles	47.06
2025	World Championships	Tokyo, Japan	5th	4 × 400 m relay	3:01.64
2026	World Ultimate Championship	Budapest, Hungary	5th	400 m hurdles	47.78

== Personal bests ==
Event	Time (s)	Venue	Date
200 m	21.17	Barcelona	8 June 2016
400 m	44.60	Pretoria	9 April 2019
400 m hurdles	46.98	Paris	30 June 2018
4 × 400 m relay	3:00.58	Jakarta	31 August 2018
4 × 400 m relay (indoor)	3:10.08	Tehran	3 February 2018

All information from IAAF profile. Last updated 8 March 2019
