= Abdalelah Haroun =

Qatari athletics competitor (1997–2021)

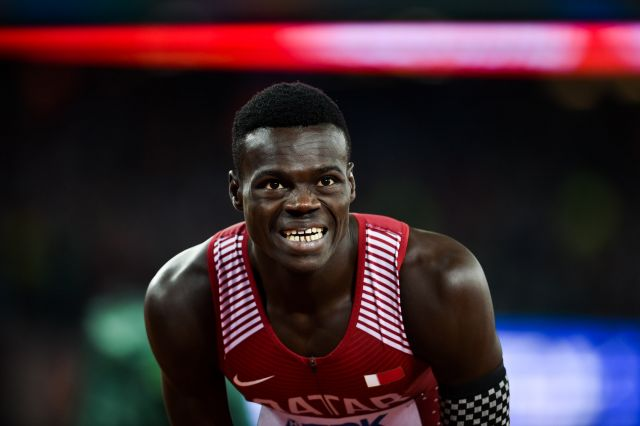
- Haroun at the 2017 World Championships

Personal information
- Native name: عبد الإله هارون
- Nationality: Sudanese; Qatari
- Born: 1 January 1997 Al-Soki, Sennar, Sudan
- Died: 26 June 2021 (aged 24) Doha, Qatar
- Height: 1.85 m (6 ft 1 in)
- Weight: 80 kg (176 lb)

Sport
- Country: Qatar
- Sport: Athletics
- Event: 400 metres
- Coached by: Luiz de Oliveira

Achievements and titles
- Personal bests: 400 m: 44.07 (2018); 500 m (indoors): 59.83 WB (Stockholm 2016)
Medal record
Men's athletics
World Championships
Bronze medal – third place	2017 London	400 m
World Indoor Championships
Silver medal – second place	2016 Portland	400 m
Asian Games
Gold medal – first place	2018 Jakarta	400 m
Gold medal – first place	2018 Jakarta	4×400 m
Asian Athletics Championships
Gold medal – first place	2015 Wuhan	400 m
Gold medal – first place	2015 Wuhan	4×400 m
Asian Indoor Championships
Gold medal – first place	2016 Doha	400 m
Gold medal – first place	2016 Doha	4×400 m
Gold medal – first place	2018 Tehran	400 m
Gold medal – first place	2018 Tehran	4×400 m
World Junior Championships
Gold medal – first place	2016 Bydgoszcz	400 m

Abdalelah Haroun Hassan (Arabic: عبد الإله هارون; 1 January 1997 – 26 June 2021) was a Qatari track and field sprinter. He specialised in the 400 metres. He was the 2015 Asian champion in the event and holds the Asian indoor record.

== Biography ==
Haroun was recruited at a young age from Sudan by Qatar. He gained eligibility to represent Qatar in February 2015. His first recorded performance was a time of 45.74 seconds for the 400 m in Doha in April 2014, which placed him among the world's most promising young sprinters for the event. He announced himself on the elite scene in his next performance at the XL Galan in February 2015 by running an Asian indoor record of 45.39 seconds, which was also the third fastest ever by a junior category athlete and the fastest ever indoor debut. His next outing one month later he set an outdoor best of 44.68 seconds. He was a comfortable victor at the 2015 Arab Athletics Championships in April, beating Egypt's Anas Beshr by nearly a second.

He ran at the Doha Diamond League meeting and won the non-Diamond-race contest with another sub-45-second run. On his IAAF Diamond League debut proper, he finished fifth at the Prefontaine Classic. He quickly established himself as one of Asia's top senior athletes at the 2015 Asian Athletics Championships by beating two-time defending champion Yousef Masrahi of Saudi Arabia in the 400 m final with his third 44.68-second clocking of the season. Masrahi was indignant about losing to his younger rival, saying "44.68 is nothing for me actually. I will come back. I will break the Asian record again".

On June 26, 2021, Haroun died in a car crash in Doha, at the age of 24.

== Personal bests ==
- 400 metres outdoors: 44.07 seconds (2018)
- 400 metres indoors: 45.39 seconds (2015) AR
- 4 × 400 metres relay: 3:00.56 (2018) AR

== International competitions ==
Year	Competition	Venue	Position	Event	Notes
2015	Arab Championships	Isa Town, Bahrain	1st	400 m	44.68
2015	Asian Championships	Wuhan, China	1st	400 m	44.68
2016	Asian Indoor Championships	Doha, Qatar	1st	400 m	45.88
2016	Asian Indoor Championships	Doha, Qatar	1st	4 × 400 m relay	3:08.20
2016	World Indoor Championships	Portland, United States	2nd	400 m	45.59
2016	World U20 Championships	Bydgoszcz, Poland	1st	400 m	44.81
2016	Olympic Games	Rio de Janeiro, Brazil	23rd (sf)	400 m	46.66
2017	World Championships	London, Great Britain	3rd	400 m	44.48
2017	Asian Indoor and Martial Arts Games	Ashgabat, Turkmenistan	1st	400 m	45.68
2017	Asian Indoor and Martial Arts Games	Ashgabat, Turkmenistan	12th (sf)	800 m	2:07.94
2017	Asian Indoor and Martial Arts Games	Ashgabat, Turkmenistan	2nd	4 × 400 m relay	3:12.58
2018	Asian Indoor Championships	Tehran, Iran	1st	400 m	46.37
2018	Asian Indoor Championships	Tehran, Iran	1st	4 × 400 m relay	3:10.08
2018	World Indoor Championships	Birmingham, United Kingdom	–	400 m	DQ
2018	Asian Games	Jakarta, Indonesia	1st	400 m	44.89
2018	Asian Games	Jakarta, Indonesia	1st	4 × 400 m relay	3:00.56
2019	World Championships	Doha, Qatar	37th (h)	400 m	47.76
