= Taha Hussein Yaseen =

Iraqi sprinter (born 1998)

Personal information
- Born: 1 January 1998 (age 28)

Sport
- Sport: Athletics
- Event: 400 metres
Medal record
Men's athletics
Representing Iraq
Asian Indoor Championships
Silver medal – second place	2024 Tehran	4×400 m relay

Taha Hussein Yaseen (Arabic: طه حسين ياسين; born 1 January 1998) is an Iraqi sprinter specialising in the 400 metres. He represented his country at the 2019 World Championships without advancing from the first round. Earlier that year he finished sixth at the 2019 Asian Championships.

== International competitions ==
Year	Competition	Venue	Position	Event	Notes
Representing Iraq
2015	World Youth Championships	Cali, Colombia	33rd (h)	400 m	48.59
2016	Arab Junior Championships	Tlemcen, Algeria	3rd	200 m	21.77
2016	Arab Junior Championships	Tlemcen, Algeria	2nd	400 m	47.14
2016	Asian Junior Championships	Ho Chi Minh City, Vietnam	2nd	400 m	47.55
2016	Asian Junior Championships	Ho Chi Minh City, Vietnam	4th	4 × 400 m relay	3:12.41
2016	World U20 Championships	Bydgoszcz, Poland	17th (sf)	400 m	47.26
2018	West Asian Championships	Amman, Jordan	1st	4 × 400 m relay	3:09.96
2018	Asian Games	Jakarta, Indonesia	7th	4 × 400 m relay	3:07.64
2019	Arab Championships	Cairo, Egypt	8th (h)	400 m	47.85
2019	Arab Championships	Cairo, Egypt	1st	4 × 400 m relay	3:06.23
2019	Asian Championships	Doha, Qatar	6th	400 m	45.74
2019	Asian Championships	Doha, Qatar	–	4 × 400 m relay	DQ
2019	World Championships	Doha, Qatar	31st (h)	400 m	46.58
2021	Arab Championships	Radès, Tunisia	2nd	200 m	21.00
2021	Arab Championships	Radès, Tunisia	1st	400 m	46.29
2021	Arab Championships	Radès, Tunisia	1st	4 × 400 m relay	3:11.27
2021	Olympic Games	Tokyo, Japan	30th (h)	400 m	46.00
2023	West Asian Championships	Doha, Qatar	4th	200 m	21.20
2023	West Asian Championships	Doha, Qatar	4th	400 m	47.41
2023	West Asian Championships	Doha, Qatar	2nd	4 × 400 m relay	3:07.53
2023	Arab Championships	Marrakesh, Morocco	6th	400 m	47.44
2023	Arab Championships	Marrakesh, Morocco	2nd	4 × 400 m relay	3:07.42
2023	Arab Games	Oran, Algeria	3rd	200 m	20.99
2023	Arab Games	Oran, Algeria	3rd	4 × 400 m relay	3:06.37
2023	World Championships	Budapest, Hungary	43rd (h)	200 m	21.01
2023	Asian Games	Hangzhou, China	8th (h)	4 × 400 m relay	3:07.58^{1}
2024	Asian Indoor Championships	Tehran, Iran	2nd	4 × 400 m relay	3:12.09
2024	West Asian Championships	Basra, Iraq	3rd	400 m	45.88
2024	West Asian Championships	Basra, Iraq	2nd	4 × 400 m relay	3:07.54
2024	Olympic Games	Paris, France	62nd (h)	100 m	10.50
2025	Asian Championships	Gumi, South Korea	10th (sf)	400 m	47.07
2025	Islamic Solidarity Games	Riyadh, Saudi Arabia	7th	400 m	47.24

^{1}Disqualified in the final

== Personal bests ==
Outdoor

- 200 metres – 21.77 (+0.5 m/s, Tlemcen 2016)
- 400 metres – 45.74 (Doha 2019) NR

Indoor

- 400 metres – 49.03 (Tehran 2019)
