= Mikhail Litvin =

Kazakhstani sprinter (born 1996)

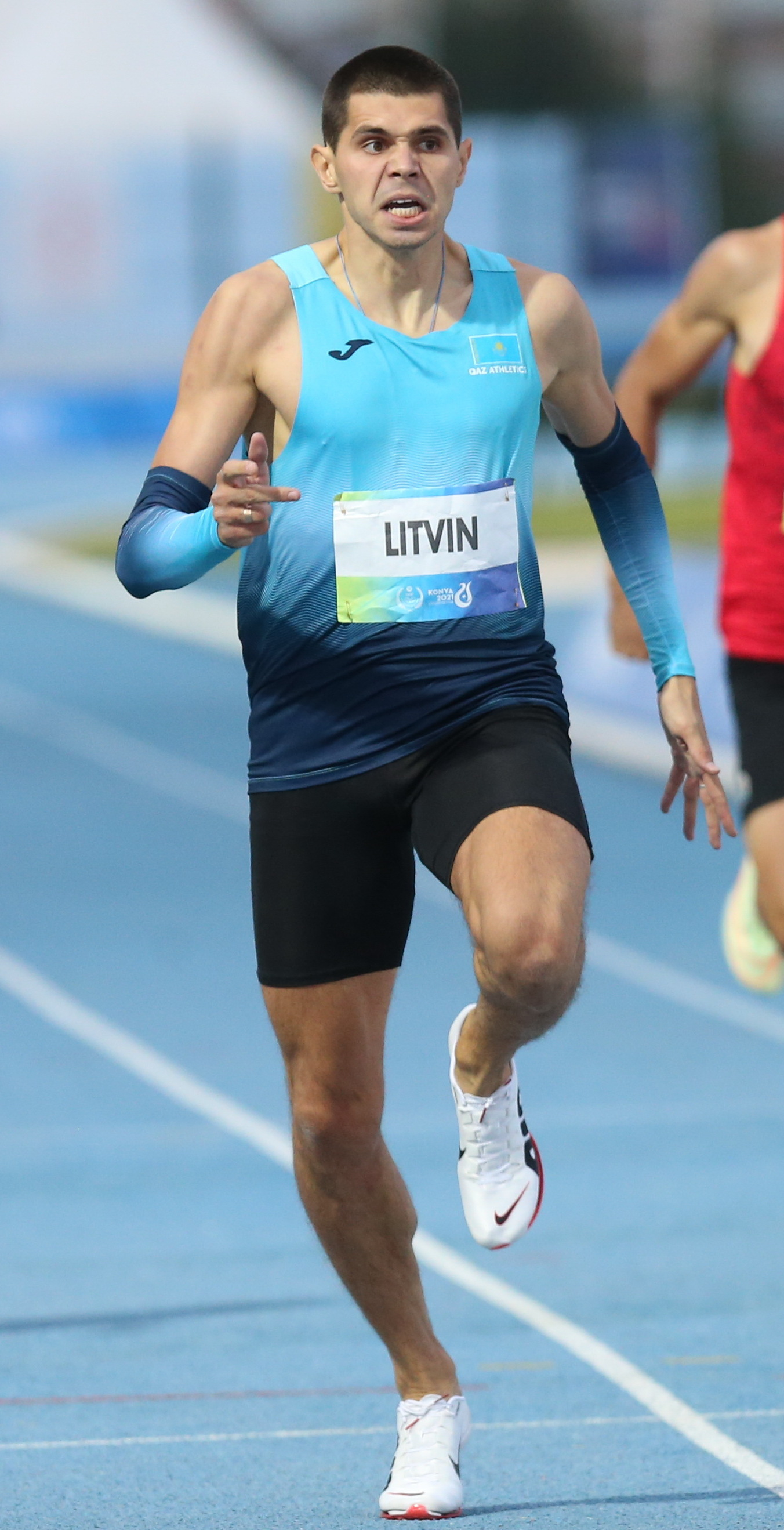
- Litvin in 2022

Personal information
- Full name: Mikhail Sergeyevich Litvin
- Born: 5 January 1996 (age 30) Petropavl, Kazakhstan
- Education: Kazakh Academy of Sport & Tourism
- Height: 1.85 m (6 ft 1 in)
- Weight: 75 kg (165 lb)

Sport
- Sport: Athletics
- Event: 400 metres
Medal record
Men's athletics
Representing Kazakhstan
Asian Indoor Championships
Gold medal – first place	2023 Astana	4×400 m
Silver medal – second place	2018 Tehran	4×400 m
Silver medal – second place	2023 Astana	400 m
Bronze medal – third place	2016 Doha	400 m

Mikhail Sergeyevich Litvin (Kazakh: Михаил Сергеевич Литвин; born 5 January 1996 in Petropavl) is a Kazakhstani sprinter specialising in the 400 metres. He won a bronze medal at the 2016 Asian Indoor Championships.

== International competitions ==
Year	Competition	Venue	Position	Event	Notes
Representing Kazakhstan
2013	World Youth Championships	Donetsk, Ukraine	55th (h)	200 m	22.44
2014	Asian Junior Championships	Taipei, Taiwan	4th	400 m	47.69
2014	Asian Junior Championships	Taipei, Taiwan	8th	4 × 400 m relay	3:16.02
2014	World Junior Championships	Eugene, United States	–	400 m	DQ
2015	Asian Championships	Wuhan, China	11th (h)	400 m	47.18
2015	Universiade	Gwangju, South Korea	11th (h)	4 × 400 m relay	3:13.59
2016	Asian Indoor Championships	Doha, Qatar	3rd	400 m	46.80
2017	Universiade	Taipei, Taiwan	7th	400 m	46.93
2017	Universiade	Taipei, Taiwan	9th (h)	4 × 400 m relay	3:09.97
2017	Asian Indoor and Martial Arts Games	Ashgabat, Turkmenistan	3rd	400 m	46.51
2017	Asian Indoor and Martial Arts Games	Ashgabat, Turkmenistan	–	4 × 400 m relay	DNF
2018	Asian Indoor Championships	Tehran, Iran	4th	400 m	47.51
2018	Asian Indoor Championships	Tehran, Iran	2nd	4 × 400 m relay	3:11.68
2018	World Indoor Championships	Birmingham, United Kingdom	16th (sf)	400 m	47.94
2018	Asian Games	Jakarta, Indonesia	6th	400 m	46.17
2019	Asian Championships	Doha, Qatar	3rd	400 m	45.25
2019	Universiade	Naples, Italy	2nd	400 m	45.77
2019	Universiade	Naples, Italy	8th	4 × 400 m relay	3:07.66
2019	World Championships	Doha, Qatar	30th (h)	400 m	46.28
2021	Olympic Games	Tokyo, Japan	41st (h)	400 m	47.15
2022	World Indoor Championships	Belgrade, Serbia	9th (sf)	400 m	46.89
2022	World Championships	Eugene, United States	16th (sf)	400 m	45.63
2022	Islamic Solidarity Games	Konya, Turkey	1st	400 m	45.36
2022	Islamic Solidarity Games	Konya, Turkey	5th	4 × 400 m relay	3:10.63
2023	Asian Indoor Championships	Astana, Kazakhstan	2nd	400 m	46.39
2023	Asian Indoor Championships	Astana, Kazakhstan	1st	4 × 400 m relay	3:09.15
2023	Asian Championships	Bangkok, Thailand	12th (sf)	400 m	46.74
2023	Asian Championships	Bangkok, Thailand	9th (h)	4 × 400 m relay	3:11.70
2023	World University Games	Chengdu, China	20th (h)	400 m	47.49^{1}
2025	Asian Championships	Gumi, South Korea	6th	4 × 400 m relay	3:11.82

^{1}Disqualified in the semifinals

== Personal bests ==
Outdoor

- 200 metres – 21.38 (Almaty 2018)
- 400 metres – 45.25 (Doha 2019) NR

Indoor

- 200 metres – 21.92 (Kamenogorsk 2017)
- 400 metres – 46.26 (Kamenogorsk 2019) NR
