= 2019 Asian Athletics Championships – Men's 4 × 400 metres relay =

Men's 4 × 400 metres relay at the 2019 Asian Athletics Championships
- Venue: Khalifa International Stadium
- Location: Doha, Qatar
- Dates: 24 April
- Nations: 6
- Winning time: 3:02.94

Medalists
gold medal	Julian Walsh; Kentaro Sato; Rikuya Ito; Kota Wakabayashi	Japan
silver medal	Lu Zhiquan; Wu Lei; Yang Lei; Wu Yuang	China
bronze medal	Ashraf Hussein Osman; Abubaker Haydar Abdalla; Bassem Hemeida; Abderrahman Samba	Qatar

The men's 4 × 400 metres relay event at the 2019 Asian Athletics Championships was held on 24 April.

== Results ==
Rank	Team	Name	Time	Notes
1st place, gold medalist(s)	Japan	Julian Walsh, Kentaro Sato, Rikuya Ito, Kota Wakabayashi	3:02.94	
2nd place, silver medalist(s)	China	Lu Zhiquan, Wu Lei, Yang Lei, Wu Yuang	3:03.55	NR
3rd place, bronze medalist(s)	Qatar	Ashraf Hussein Osman, Abubaker Haydar Abdalla, Bassem Hemeida, Abderrahman Samba	3:03.95	
4	Thailand	Apisit Chamsri, Nattapong Kongkraphan, Jirayu Pleenaram, Phitchaya Sunthonthuam	3:10.28	
5	Maldives	Hassan Nujoom, Ibadulla Adam, Ibrahim Ashfan Ali, Hussain Riza	3:30.59	
	India	Kunhu Muhammed, Jeevan Karekoppa Suresh, Mohammed Anas, Arokia Rajiv	DQ	R163.2
	Iraq	Yasir Ali Al-Saadi, Ihab Jabbar Hashim, Mohammed Abdulridha Al-Tameemi, Taha Hussein Yassen	DQ	R170.19
