= Michael Cherry (athlete) =

American sprinter (born 1995)

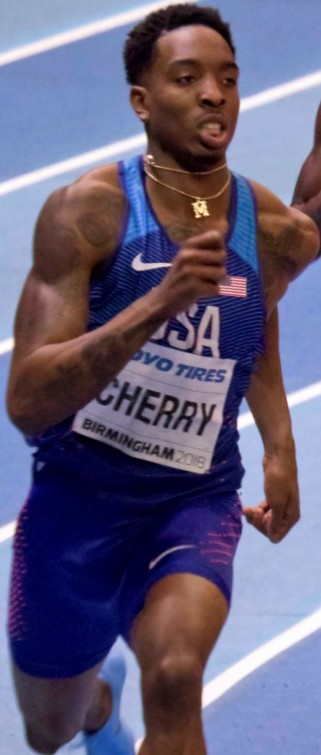
- Cherry at the 2018 IAAF Indoor World Track & field Championship

Personal information
- Full name: Michael Cherry Jr.
- Nationality: American
- Born: March 23, 1995 (age 31) Brooklyn, New York, U.S.
- Height: 6 ft 4 in (193 cm)
- Weight: 194 lb (88 kg)

Sport
- Country: United States
- Sport: Track and field
- Event: Sprint
- College team: Florida State Seminoles; LSU Tigers
- Coached by: John Smith

Achievements and titles
- Personal best: 400 m: 44.03 (Brussels 2021) 600 m: 1:14.36 (Carolina 2023)
Medal record
Men's track and field
Representing the United States
Olympic Games
Gold medal – first place	2020 Tokyo	4 × 400 m relay
World Championships
Gold medal – first place	2019 Doha	4 × 400 m relay
Gold medal – first place	2019 Doha	4 × 400 m mixed
Silver medal – second place	2017 London	4 × 400 m relay
World Indoor Championships
Silver medal – second place	2018 Birmingham	400 m
Silver medal – second place	2018 Birmingham	4 × 400 m relay
Pan American Games
Silver medal – second place	2019 Lima	4 × 400 m relay

Michael Cherry (born March 23, 1995) is an Olympic Athlete who specializes in the 400 meters. He was a member of the USA team in the 4 × 400 metres relay at the 2017 World Championships in Athletics in London, UK, placing second and receiving a silver medal.

He represented the United States at the 2020 Tokyo Summer Olympics, finishing 4th in the 400 meters and winning gold in the 4 × 400 meters relay, running first for the United States in the event final.

== Competition record ==
Representing the United States
Year	Competition	Venue	Position	Event	Notes
2014	World Junior Championships	Eugene, United States	1st	4 × 400 m relay	3:03.31
2016	NACAC U23 Championships	San Salvador, El Salvador	2nd	400 m	45.50
2016	NACAC U23 Championships	San Salvador, El Salvador	1st	4 × 400 m relay	3:00.89
2017	World Championships	London, United Kingdom	2nd	4 × 400 m relay	2:58.61
2018	World Indoor Championships	Birmingham, United Kingdom	2nd	400 m	45.84
2018	World Indoor Championships	Birmingham, United Kingdom	2nd	4 × 400 m relay	3:01.97
2018	NACAC Championships	Toronto, Canada	1st	4 × 400 m relay	3:00.60
2019	Pan American Games	Lima, Peru	2nd	4 × 400 m relay	3:01.72
2019	World Championships	Doha, Qatar	1st	4 × 400 m relay	2:56.69
2021	Olympic Games	Tokyo, Japan	4th	400 m	44.21 PB
2021	Olympic Games	Tokyo, Japan	1st	4 × 400 m relay	2:55.70 SB
2022	World Championships	Eugene, United States	13th (sf)	400 m	45.28
