= Mehdi Pirjahan =

Iranian hurdler (born 1999)

Mahdi Pirjahan
Personal information
- Born: 23 September 1999 (age 26) Tabriz, Iran
- Height: 178 cm (5.84 ft)
- Weight: 74 kg (163 lb)

Sport
- Sport: Athletics
- Event: 400 metres hurdles

Achievements and titles
- Personal bests: 49.33 s NR

Mahdi Pirjahan (Persian: مهدی پیرجهان; born 23 September 1999 in Tabriz) is an Iranian athlete specialising in the 400 metres hurdles. He represented his country at the 2019 World Championships narrowly missing the semifinals.

His personal best in the event is 49.33 seconds set in Lucknow, India, in 2019, which is the current Iranian national record. He repeated the same record in 2021 Summer World University Games held on 3 August 2023 in Chengdu, China.

== Tokyo 2020 Summer Olympic Games ==
Pirjahan became the fourth Iranian athlete to win a quota place in Tokyo 2020 Olympics. He was supposed to participate at the Men's 400m hurdles but has tested positive for the coronavirus.

== International competitions ==
Year	Competition	Venue	Position	Event	Notes
Representing Iran
2018	Asian Junior Championships	Gifu, Japan	3rd	400 m hurdles	51.18
2018	World U20 Championships	Tampere, Finland	7th	400 m hurdles	51.15
2019	Asian Championships	Doha, Qatar	6th	400 m hurdles	50.18
2019	World Championships	Doha, Qatar	25th (h)	400 m hurdles	50.46
2019	Military World Games	Wuhan, China	1st	400 m hurdles	49.61
2022	Islamic Solidarity Games	Konya, Turkey	4th	400 m hurdles	49.35
2023	Asian Championships	Bangkok, Thailand	5th	400 m hurdles	49.55
2023	World University Games	Chengdu, China	6th	400 m hurdles	49.53
2023	Asian Games	Hangzhou, China	14th (h)	400 m hurdles	50.95
2025	Asian Championships	Gumi, South Korea	5th	400 m hurdles	50.51
