= 2025 Asian Athletics Championships – Men's 400 metres hurdles =

Men's 400 metres hurdles at the 2025 Asian Athletics Championships
- Venue: Gumi Civic Stadium
- Location: Gumi, South Korea
- Dates: 30 May (heats); 31 May (final)
- Competitors: 20 from 15 nations
- Winning time: 48.00

Medalists
gold medal	Abderrahman Samba	Qatar
silver medal	Bassem Hemeida	Qatar
bronze medal	Lin Chung-wei	Chinese Taipei

The men's 400 metres hurdles event at the 2025 Asian Athletics Championships was held on 30 and 31 May.

== Records ==
Records before the 2025 Asian Athletics Championships
Record	Athlete (nation)	Time (s)	Location	Date
World record	Karsten Warholm (NOR)	45.94	Tokyo, Japan	3 August 2021
Asian record	Abderrahman Samba (QAT)	46.98	Paris, France	30 June 2018
Championship record	Abderrahman Samba (QAT)	47.51	Doha, Qatar	22 April 2019
World leading	Karsten Warholm (NOR)	47.28	Shaoxing, China	3 May 2025
Asian leading	Ken Toyoda (JPN)	48.55	Tokyo, Japan	18 May 2025

== Schedule ==
The event schedule, in local time (UTC+9), was as follows:

Date	Time	Round
30 May	10:30	Heats
31 May	18:00	Final

== Results ==
=== Heats ===
Held on 30 May. First 2 in each heat (Q) and the next 2 fastest (q) qualified for the final.

==== Heat 1 ====
Place	Lane	Athlete	Nation	Time	Notes
1	4	Abderrahman Samba	Qatar	50.17	Q
2	6	Calvin Quek	Singapore	50.58	Q, SB
3	7	Chen Jian-rong	Chinese Taipei	50.80	
4	2	Hasanbek Rustamjonov	Uzbekistan	52.12	PB
5	3	Chan Chun Ho	Hong Kong	52.70	PB
—	5	Vyacheslav Zems	Kazakhstan	DNS	

==== Heat 2 ====
Place	Lane	Athlete	Nation	Time	Notes
1	4	Shunta Inoue	Japan	50.28	Q
2	5	Marc Anthony Ibrahim	Lebanon	51.39	Q
3	8	Jo Hwi-in	South Korea	51.70	SB
4	7	Muhammad Fakrul	Malaysia	52.31	
5	6	Nazimul Hossain	Bangladesh	52.36	
6	3	Cheong Chi Chong	Macau	53.25	
7	2	Muhammadrizoi Mirzozoda	Tajikistan	53.87	

==== Heat 3 ====
Place	Lane	Athlete	Nation	Time	Notes
1	4	Lin Chung-wei	Chinese Taipei	49.63	Q, PB
2	5	Xie Zhiyu	China	50.07	Q, SB
3	6	Bassem Hemeida	Qatar	50.15	q, SB
4	7	Mehdi Pirjahan	Iran	50.41	q, SB
5	2	Kwak Ui-chan	South Korea	54.04	
—	3	Azzam Ibrahim Abu Bakr	Saudi Arabia	DQ	TR 16.8
—	8	Dmitriy Koblov	Kazakhstan	DQ	TR 16.8

=== Final ===
Place	Lane	Athlete	Nation	Time	Notes
1st place, gold medalist(s)	5	Abderrahman Samba	Qatar	48.00	
2nd place, silver medalist(s)	1	Bassem Hemeida	Qatar	49.44	SB
3rd place, bronze medalist(s)	4	Lin Chung-wei	Chinese Taipei	49.73	
4	6	Shunta Inoue	Japan	50.02	
5	2	Mehdi Pirjahan	Iran	50.51	
6	8	Marc Anthony Ibrahim	Lebanon	50.56	SB
7	7	Xie Zhiyu	China	50.57	
8	3	Calvin Quek	Singapore	50.94	
