= Akuramboda =

- Village
- Location within Sri Lanka
- Coordinates: 7°38′48″N 80°36′05″E
- Country: Sri Lanka
- Province: Central Province
- District: Matale District
- Time zone: UTC+5:30 (Sri Lanka Standard Time)

Akuramboda is a village located in Matale District of Sri Lanka's Central Province.

== History ==
According to tradition, the first settler of the village was a bandāra from "Arakan" during the reign of an early Sinhalese king. A Buddhist vihāra in the village is said to have been built during the reign of the Sinhalese king Dutugamunu.

A government school was operating at the village in 1880 with 170 boys on the roll, 166 boys in 1887, and 168 in 1893.

== Demographics ==
Historical population
Year	Pop.	±%
1881	269	—
1891	188	−30.1%

== See also ==
- List of towns in Central Province, Sri Lanka
