= Kentaro Sato (sprinter) =

Japanese sprinter (born 1994)

Personal information
- Nationality: Japanese
- Born: 16 November 1994 (age 31) Tokorozawa, Saitama, Japan
- Education: Josai University
- Height: 1.74 m (5 ft 9 in)
- Weight: 67 kg (148 lb)

Sport
- Country: Japan
- Sport: Track and field
- Event: 400 metres
- Club: Fujitsu Track & Field Team

Achievements and titles
- Personal bests: 200 m: 21.19 (2014) 300 m: 32.83 (2015) 400 m: 44.77 (2023)
Medal record
Men's athletics
Representing Japan
World Relays
Silver medal – second place	2021 Chorzów	4×400 m relay
Asian Championships
Gold medal – first place	2019 Doha	4×400 m relay
Gold medal – first place	2023 Bangkok	400 m
Silver medal – second place	2025 Gumi	400 m
Bronze medal – third place	2015 Wuhan	400 m
Bronze medal – third place	2019 Doha	4×400 m relay (Mixed)
Universiade
Silver medal – second place	2015 Gwangju	4×400 m relay

Kentaro Sato (佐藤 拳太郎, Satō Kentarō; born 16 November 1994 in Tokorozawa, Saitama) is a Japanese track and field sprinter who specialises in the 400 metres. His personal best in the event is 44.77 seconds. He has represented Japan at several world meets including the 2017 World Championships, 2019 World Championships, and the 2023 World Championships. He was also a reserve athlete for the Japanese 4 × 400 metres relay team at the 2015 World Championships and 2016 Olympic Games.

== Personal bests ==
Event	Time (s)	Competition	Venue	Date	Notes
200 m	21.19 (wind: +0.4 m/s)	Saitama Championships	Kumagaya, Japan	28 June 2014	
300 m	32.83	Izumo Meet	Izumo, Japan	12 April 2015	
400 m	44.77	2023 World Championship	Budapest, Hungary	20 August 2023	

== International competition ==
Year	Competition	Venue	Position	Event	Time
Representing Japan
2015	World Relays	Nassau, Bahamas	17th (h)	4×400 m relay	3:06.38 (relay leg: 2nd) SB
2015	Asian Championships	Wuhan, China	3rd	400 m	46.09
2015	Universiade	Gwangju, South Korea	10th (sf)	400 m	46.36
2015	Universiade	Gwangju, South Korea	2nd	4×400 m relay	3:07.75 (relay leg: 4th)
2017	World Championships	London, United Kingdom	15th (h)	4×400 m relay	3:07.29 (relay leg: 1st)
2017	DécaNation	Angers, France	5th	400 m	48.18
2017	DécaNation	Angers, France	2nd	4×400 m relay (Mixed)	3:27.88 (relay leg: 1st)
2019	Asian Championships	Doha, Qatar	1st	4×400 m relay	3:02.94 (relay leg: 2nd)
2019	Asian Championships	Doha, Qatar	3rd	4×400 m relay (Mixed)	3:20.73 (relay leg: 4th)
2019	World Relays	Yokohama, Japan	4th	4×400 m relay	3:03.24 (relay leg: 2nd)
2019	World Championships	Doha, Qatar	9th (h)	4×400 m relay	3:02.05 (relay leg: 3rd) SB
2021	World Relays	Chorzów, Poland	2nd	4 × 400 m relay	3:04.45 (relay leg: 3rd)
2021	Olympic Games	Tokyo, Japan	10th (h)	4 × 400 m relay	3:00.76 (relay leg: 3rd)
2023	Asian Championships	Bangkok, Thailand	1st	400 m	45.00
2023	World Championships	Budapest, Hungary	11th (sf)	400 m	44.99
2023	Asian Games	Hangzhou, China	2nd	400 m	45.57
2024	Olympic Games	Paris, France	33rd (h)	400 m	45.60
2024	Olympic Games	Paris, France	6th	4 × 400 m relay	2:58.33
2025	Asian Championships	Gumi, South Korea	2nd	400 m	45.50
