= Ashraf Osman =

Qatari sprinter (born 2001)

Personal information
- Native name: Arabic: أشرف حسين محمد عثمان
- Full name: Ashraf Hussen Osman
- Nationality: Qatar
- Born: 2 December 2001 (age 24)
- Height: 184 cm (6 ft 0 in)
- Weight: 75 kg (165 lb)

Sport
- Sport: Sport of athletics
- Events: 400 metres hurdles 400 metres
- Club: Al-Arabi SC

Achievements and titles
- National finals: 2022 Turkish Champs; • 400m hurdles, 2nd (silver)
- Personal bests: 400mH: 49.49 (2021); 400m: 45.01 (2023)
Medal record
Men's athletics
Representing Qatar
Asian Championships
Bronze medal – third place	2019 Doha	4 × 400 m relay
Bronze medal – third place	2023 Bangkok	4 × 400 m relay
Asian Games
Silver medal – second place	2023 Hangzhou	4 × 400 m relay
Asian Indoor Championships
Gold medal – first place	2026 Tanjijn	4 x 400m relay
GCC Games
Gold medal – first place	2022 Kuwait City	400 m hurdles
Bronze medal – third place	2022 Kuwait City	4 × 400 m relay
Arab Games
Gold medal – first place	2023 Oran	400 m
Arab Championships
Silver medal – second place	2021 Radès	400 m hurdles
Gold medal – first place	2023 Marrakesh	400 m
West Asian Championships
Gold medal – first place	2023 Doha	4 × 400 m relay
Silver medal – second place	2023 Doha	400 m
Arab U23 Championships
Bronze medal – third place	2023 Radès	4 × 400 m relay
- Updated on 6 May 2024

Ashraf Hussen Osman (Arabic: أشرف حسين محمد عثمان; born 2 December 2001), also spelled Ashraf Hussein Osman or Ashrat Hussen Osman, is a Qatari sprinter and hurdler specializing in the 400 metres. As of 2024, he has won 11 medals at international championships representing Qatar, including 6 in relays and 5 individually. He won individual gold medals at the GCC Games, Arab Games, and Arab Athletics Championships.

== Career ==
Osman first represented Qatar at the 2019 Asian Athletics Championships. He placed 7th in his semi-final in the 400 metres and won a bronze medal the 4 × 400 m relay. He was named to the Qatari team for the 2019 World Athletics Championships in the relay. At the championships, the Qatari relay team finished 15th of 15 finishers and did not qualify for the finals.

Osman did not return to athletics until 2021, winning the 2021 Doha Diamond League national 400 m hurdles and then winning a silver medal at the 2021 Arab Athletics Championships in that event. At the 2022 GCC Games, Osman placed 5th in the 400 m and won his first individual gold in the 400 m hurdles.

Osman represented Qatar at five international championships in 2023, winning six medals. His first were at the 2023 West Asian Athletics Championships in the 4 × 400 m as well as a silver in the 400 metres, behind Ammar Ismail Yahya. Following another win at the 2023 Doha Diamond League national race, Osman competed at the inaugural Arab U23 Championships, placing 6th in the 400 m and winning bronze in the relay. He then won his first Arab Championships gold in the 400 m, followed by repeating that success winning the 2023 Arab Games 400 m title. At the 2023 Asian Athletics Championships, Osman completed a double placing 5th in the 400 m and winning bronze in the relay. He finished his season at the Asian Games, winning silver in the relay and placing 4th individually in the 400 m.

In 2024, Osman represented Qatar at the World Relays men's 4 × 400 m. Running third leg, his team placed 10th in the first round and did not finish the repechage round, failing to guarantee qualification to the 2024 Olympics in that event.

== Personal life ==
Born in 2001, Osman first competed in North West, South Africa before moving to Qatar. He represents Al-Arabi SC.

== Statistics ==
=== Personal best progression ===
400m progression
#	Mark	Pl.	Competition	Venue	Date	Ref.
1	47.61A	1st place, gold medalist(s)		Pretoria, South Africa	25 Jan 2019	
2	47.59	3rd place, bronze medalist(s)	EMIR CUP Clubs Championships	Doha, Qatar	7 Apr 2019	
3	46.54	4th (Heat 1)	Asian Athletics Championships	Doha, Qatar	20 Apr 2019	
4	46.41A	1st place, gold medalist(s)	ACNW Championships	Potchefstroom, South Africa	10 Mar 2022	
5	46.10	(gold) (Heat 2)	Arab Athletics Championships	Marrakesh, Morocco	19 Jun 2023	
6	45.01	1st place, gold medalist(s)	Arab Athletics Championships	Marrakesh, Morocco	20 Jun 2023	

400m Hurdles progression
#	Mark	Pl.	Competition	Venue	Date	Ref.
1	53.79	2nd place, silver medalist(s)	EMIR CUP Clubs Championships	Doha, Qatar	9 Apr 2019	
2	50.36	1st place, gold medalist(s)		Doha, Qatar	22 May 2021	
3	49.58	(gold) (Round B)	Doha Diamond League	Doha, Qatar	27 May 2021	
4	49.49	2nd place, silver medalist(s)	Arab Athletics Championships	Radès, Tunisia	19 Jun 2021	
