= Mijo Chacko Kurian =

Indian athlete from Kerala

Mijo Chacko Kurian (born 16 July 1995) is an Indian athlete from Kerala. He competes in 400m. He was a member of the Men's 4 × 400 m relay in the 2022 Asian Games at Hangzhou, China. He is named in the Indian 4 × 400 m relay team for the 2024 Summer Olympics at Paris.

== Early life and education ==
Kurian is from Panambur, near Mangalore but is a descendant of Kerala. His was born in Kerala ato Mini and Kurian but shifted to Panambur after the transfer of his father. He did his studies at St Aloysius Urwa and Sharadha Vidyalaya. In 2019, he joined Indian Airforce at Bangalore in sports quota.

== Career ==
In May 2022, Kurien was named the best male athlete at the Karnataka State Athletics Championship at Udupi. In September, he clocked 46.10s at the Inter-Services Athletics Championships in Jalahalli. The following month, he won the gold in 400m, clocking 46.34s at the National Open Athletics Championships at the Sree Kanteerava Outdoor Stadium in Bangalore.

In June 2023, Kurien clocked 46.61s in 400m at the Indian Championships from the Kalinga Stadium in Bhubaneshwar. In August, he was named to the Men's 4 × 400 m relay team at the World Athletics Championships in Budapest. The next month, he clocked 46.85 in 400m at the Indian Grand Prix 5 in Chandigarh. He was also named a member of the Men's 4 × 400 m relay in the 2022 Asian Games at Hangzhou, China.
