= Mazen Al-Yassin =

Saudi Arabian sprinter (born 1996)

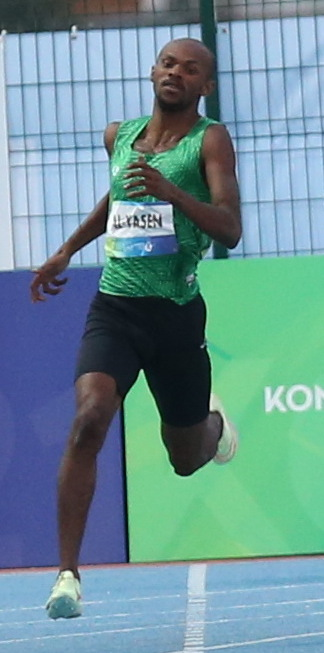
- Mazen Al-Yassin in 2022

Personal information
- Full name: Mazen Moutan Al-Yassin
- Born: 8 July 1996 (age 30)
- Height: 1.76 m (5 ft 9 in)
- Weight: 73 kg (161 lb)

Sport
- Sport: Athletics
- Event: 400 metres

Mazen Moutan Al-Yassin (born 8 July 1996) is a Saudi Arabian sprinter specialising in the 400 metres. He won a silver medal at the 2017 Asian Indoor and Martial Arts Games. With the time of 46.35 he is the current Saudi indoor national record holder.

== International competitions ==
Year	Competition	Venue	Position	Event	Notes
Representing Saudi Arabia
2013	World Youth Championships	Donetsk, Ukraine	9th (sf)	400 m	46.99
2013	Islamic Solidarity Games	Palembang, Indonesia	8th (h)	200 m	21.58^{1}
2013	Islamic Solidarity Games	Palembang, Indonesia	1st	4 × 400 m relay	3:03.70
2014	Asian Junior Championships	Taipei, Taiwan	2nd	400 m	47.40
2014	World Junior Championships	Eugene, United States	27th (h)	400 m	47.85
2015	World Relays	Nassau, Bahamas	13th (h)	4 × 400 m relay	3:06.15
2015	Asian Championships	Wuhan, China	17th (h)	400 m	47.92
2015	Asian Championships	Wuhan, China	2nd	4 × 400 m relay	3:02.62
2015	Military World Games	Mungyeong, South Korea	31st (h)	400 m	49.29
2017	Arab Championships	Radès, Tunisia	2nd	400 m	46.76
2017	Arab Championships	Radès, Tunisia	3rd	4 × 400 m relay	3:08.23
2017	Asian Indoor and Martial Arts Games	Ashgabat, Turkmenistan	2nd	400 m	46.35
2019	Arab Championships	Cairo, Egypt	3rd	400 m	47.56
2019	Asian Championships	Doha, Qatar	21st (h)	400 m	48.24
2019	World Championships	Doha, Qatar	23rd (sf)	400 m	46.11
2021	Olympic Games	Tokyo, Japan	16th (sf)	400 m	45.37
2022	World Indoor Championships	Belgrade, Serbia	19th (h)	400 m	47.65
2022	Islamic Solidarity Games	Konya, Turkey	3rd	400 m	45.95
2022	Islamic Solidarity Games	Konya, Turkey	–	4 × 400 m relay	DQ
2023	Arab Championships	Marrakesh, Morocco	3rd	400 m	45.40
2023	Asian Games	Hangzhou, China	9th (h)	400 m	46.13
2024	West Asian Championships	Basra, Iraq	2nd	400 m	45.49
2025	Arab Championships	Oran, Algeria	1st	400 m	46.09
2025	Asian Championships	Gumi, South Korea	–	400 m	DNF

^{1}Disqualified in the final

== Personal bests ==
Outdoor

- 200 metres – 21.58 (+0.3 m/s, Palembang 2013)
- 400 metres – 45.28 (Tashkent 2019)

Indoor

- 400 metres – 46.35 (Ashgabat 2017) NR
