= Fuga Sato =

Japanese sprinter (born 1996)

Personal information
- Nationality: Japanese
- Born: 1 June 1996 (age 30)

Sport
- Sport: Athletics
- Event: 400 metres

Achievements and titles
- Personal bests: 200 m: 20.72 (Sano 2022); 300 m: 32.61 (Utsunomiya 2022); 400 m: 44.88 (Budapest 2023)
Medal record
Men's athletics
Representing Japan
Asian Championships
Silver medal – second place	2023 Bangkok	400 metres
Bronze medal – third place	2023 Bangkok	4 × 400 metres mixed relay
Asian Games
Gold medal – first place	2026 Aichi–Nagoya	4 × 100 m relay

Fuga Sato (佐藤 風雅, Satō Fūga; born 1 June 1996) is a Japanese sprinter who specializes in the 400 metres.

He won a silver medal in the 400 metres at the 2023 Asian Athletics Championships. He competed in the 400 metres at the 2023 World Athletics Championships, where he qualified for the semi-final.
