= Mohammad Jahir Rayhan =

Bangladeshi athlete

Personal information
- Nationality: Bangladeshi
- Born: 25 April 2001 (age 25)

Sport
- Sport: Track and Field
- Event: 400 m
Medal record
Men's athletics
Representing Bangladesh
Asian Indoor Championships
Silver medal – second place	2024 Tehran	400 m

Mohammad Jahir Rayhan (born 25 April 2001) is a Bangladeshi Olympic athlete.

He competed at the 2019 Asian Athletics Championships, and the 2019 IAAF World Athletics Championships in Doha. He competed in the Athletics at the 2020 Summer Olympics – Men's 400 metres. He has won a silver medal in 400 metre running in Asian Indoor Athletic Championship 2024.
