= Yousef Karam =

Kuwaiti sprinter (born 1993)

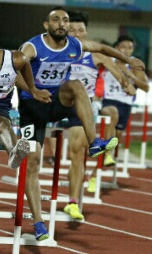
- Yousef Karam in 2017

Personal information
- Born: 15 July 1993 (age 32)

Sport
- Sport: Athletics
- Event(s): 400 m, 400 m hurdles
Medal record
Men's athletics
Representing Kuwait
Asian Indoor Championships
Silver medal – second place	2018 Tehran	400 m

Youssef Mohammed Karam Taher (born 15 July 1993) is a Kuwaiti sprinter specialising in the 400 metres and 400 metres hurdles. He represented his country at the 2018 World Indoor Championships reaching the semifinals.

== International competitions ==
Year	Competition	Venue	Position	Event	Notes
Representing Kuwait
2009	Asian Youth Games	Singapore	3rd	400 m hurdles (84 cm)	54.80
2014	Asian Games	Incheon, South Korea	15th (h)	400 m hurdles	52.15
2016	Asian Indoor Championships	Doha, Qatar	6th (sf)	400 m	47.88
2017	Arab Championships	Radès, Tunisia	1st	400 m	46.45
2017	Arab Championships	Radès, Tunisia	4th	4 × 400 m relay	3:08.55
2017	Asian Championships	Bhubaneswar, India	7th	400 m hurdles	51.36
2018	Asian Indoor Championships	Tehran, Iran	2nd	400 m	46.66
2018	Asian Indoor Championships	Tehran, Iran	4th	4 × 400 m relay	3:14.75
2018	World Indoor Championships	Birmingham, United Kingdom	9th (h)	400 m	46.86^{1}
2019	Arab Championships	Cairo, Egypt	2nd	200 m	20.81
2019	Arab Championships	Cairo, Egypt	2nd	400 m	46.06
2019	Asian Championships	Doha, Qatar	–	200 m	DQ
2019	Asian Championships	Doha, Qatar	1st	400 m	44.84
2019	World Championships	Doha, Qatar	21st (h)	400 m	45.74^{1}
2024	West Asian Championships	Basra, Iraq	4th	400 m	45.94
2025	Asian Championships	Gumi, South Korea	13th (sf)	400 m	47.39
2026	Asian Indoor Championships	Tianjin, China	11th (h)	400 m	48.46

^{1}Did not finish in the semifinals

== Personal bests ==
Outdoor

- 400 metres – 46.27 (Doha 2015)
- 800 metres – 1:54.14 (Kuwait City 2015)
- 400 metres hurdles – 50.90 (Bhubaneshwar 2017)

Indoor

- 400 metres – 46.66 (Tehran 2018)
