= Aruna Darshana =

Sri Lankan sprinter (born 1999)

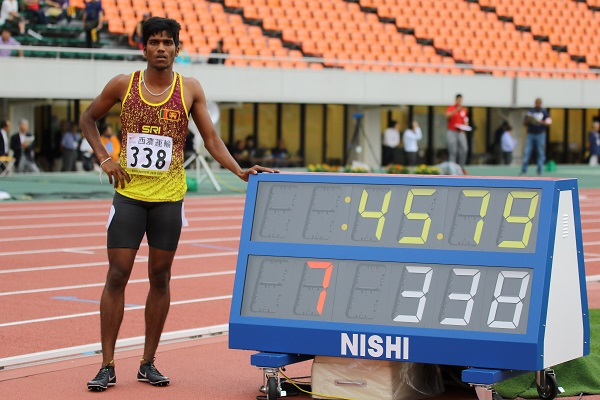

Personal information
- Full name: Singhapurage Aruna Darshana
- Born: 19 January 1999 (age 27) Sinhapura, Trincomalee District, Sri Lanka

Sport
- Country: Sri Lanka
- Sport: Athletics (track and field)
- Coached by: Asanka Rajakaruna

Achievements and titles
- Personal bests: 200m: 20.45 (Homagama, 2024); 400m: 44.99 (Paris, 2024)
Medal record
Athletics
Representing Sri Lanka
Asian Games
Bronze medal – third place	2022 Hangzhou	4 × 400 m relay
Asian Championships
Gold medal – first place	2023 Bangkok	4x400 m relay
Silver medal – second place	2023 Bangkok	Mixed 4x400 m relay
Asian Junior Championships
Gold medal – first place	2018 Gifu	400 m
Gold medal – first place	2018 Gifu	4x400 m relay
South Asian Junior Championships
Gold medal – first place	2018 Colombo	200 m
Gold medal – first place	2018 Colombo	400 m
Gold medal – first place	2018 Colombo	4x400 m relay
South Asian Games
Gold medal – first place	2019 Kathmandu	400 m
Gold medal – first place	2019 Kathmandu	4x400 m relay

Singhapurage Aruna Darshana (or Dharshana; born 19 January 1999) is a Sri Lankan sprinter specialising in the 400 metres. He was tipped by many in the circles that he could follow the footsteps of former veteran athlete Sugath Thilakaratne. He won the men's 400m event during the 2018 National Athletics Championships by clocking at 46.16 seconds.

== Biography ==
He was born in a rural village call Seruwila near Trincomalee. His father was a paddy farmer who died when Darshana was a teenager. He was solely raised up by his single mother since then along with his four brothers.

He initially pursued his studies at Dehiwatte Maha Vidyalaya in Kanthale which was just close to his house. He then later moved to Weerakeppetipola National School in Akuramboda. His talent was later spotted by athletic coach Asanka Rajakaruna who served as physical training instructor at Weerakeppetipola National School. Asanka Rajakaruna has soon become Darshana's father figure. He received support from his coach to complete the house infrastructure at Seruwila by collecting funds.

== Career ==
=== 2018 season ===
South Asian Junior Athletics Championships

He was appointed as the captain of the Sri Lankan 83 member contingent for the 2018 South Asian Junior Athletics Championships. On home soil, Darshana won the 200, 400 m and contributed to the 4 × 400 m relay at the 2018 South Asian Junior Athletics Championships in Colombo. He rose to prominence and limelight during the 2018 South Asian Junior Athletics Championships due to his medal success.

Asian Junior Athletics Championships

Darshana won two gold medals at the 2018 Asian Junior Athletics Championships in Gifu, Japan. In the 400 m event, Darshana broke the Championship record by running the race in 45.79 seconds. He subsequently shattered the Asian Junior Athletics record in 400m event which was previously held by Qatar's Salah-el-Din Bakar. He also became the youngest Sri Lankan to break the benchmark of 46 seconds following his effort by clocking at 45.79 seconds. He cemented his reputation following his heroics at the 2018 Asian Junior Athletics Championships which also prompted him to be Sri Lanka's next best thing in athletics field. His timing of 45.79 seconds put him only behind Sugath Thilakaratne, Rohan Pradeep Kumara and Prasanna Amarasekara when it comes to having better timings in 400m category. Later, he anchored the 4 × 400 m relay team to gold.

World Junior Athletics Championships

Darshana advanced to the semifinals in the 400 m event at the 2018 World Junior Athletics Championships in Tampere, Finland. In the semifinals, Darshana finished fifth in his heat, failing to advance to the final. Darshana later led the 4 × 400 m relay team to an eighth-place finish.

Asian Games

Darshana was selected for the 2018 Asian Games in Jakarta, Indonesia. Darshana is scheduled to compete in the 400 m and 4 × 400 m relay events.

=== 2023 season ===
He took part at the 10th edition of the Kinami Michitaka Memorial Athletic Meet which was held in Osaka, Japan. He spent his own funds to take part in the competition and registered his personal best in the men's 400m event by clocking 45.49 seconds. It was revealed that Darshana had utilised the funds to finance his travel expenses to Japan which he had collected and accumulated over the years which were intended and supposed to be used for upgrading and completing the house at Seruwila. He did not get sufficient support from higher authorities and athletics officials who have been engaged in tussle over the handling of sports.

During the Kinami Michitaka Memorial Athletic Meet, he in fact bettered his own personal best timing twice in the space of three days. Initially he clocked at 45.59 seconds in the men's 400m event on 4 May 2023 and he bettered it by clocking at 45.49 seconds on 6 May 2023.
