= Umar Osman =

Malaysian sprinter

Personal information
- Full name: Umar Bin Osman
- Born: 8 August 2003 (age 22) Johor, Malaysia

Sport
- Sport: Athletics
- Event: Sprinting
- Coached by: Simon Lau

Achievements and titles
- Personal best: 400 m: 46.09 NR (Chengdu 2021)
Medal record
Men's athletics
Representing Malaysia
Southeast Asian Games
Gold medal – first place	2023 Phnom Penh	400m
Bronze medal – third place	2023 Phnom Penh	4x400m

Umar Osman (born 2003) is a Malaysian sprinter. He is the current Malaysian 400 metres outdoor record holder with a time of 45.73 seconds.

== Early life and education ==
Umar was born at Johor, Malaysia. Umar currently studies industrial design at Ibrahim Sultan Polytechnic at Pasir Gudang, Malaysia.

== Career ==
Umar trained under Simon Lau and qualified for the 2023 SEA Games. On his first SEA Games' participation, Umar won the gold medal in the men's 400m event and broke Malaysia's 400m national record. Umar also won the bronze medal in the men's 4 × 400 m event with Firdaus Zemi, Ruslem Zikry Putra Roseli and Tharshan Shanmugam with a time of 3mins 8.82s.

Following the SEA Games, Umar was unable to train regularly under Lau as Lau moved to Singapore as chief coach for the Singapore Sports School.

Umar joined Zoom Club in Singapore to participate in competitions held in Singapore and was paid to represent the club.

In July 2023, Umar failed to qualify for the finals of the 2023 Asian Athletics Championships in the men's 400m event after clocking 46.42 seconds in the semi-finals.
