= Abbas Abubakar Abbas =

Nigerian-born Bahraini athlete sprinter (born 1996)

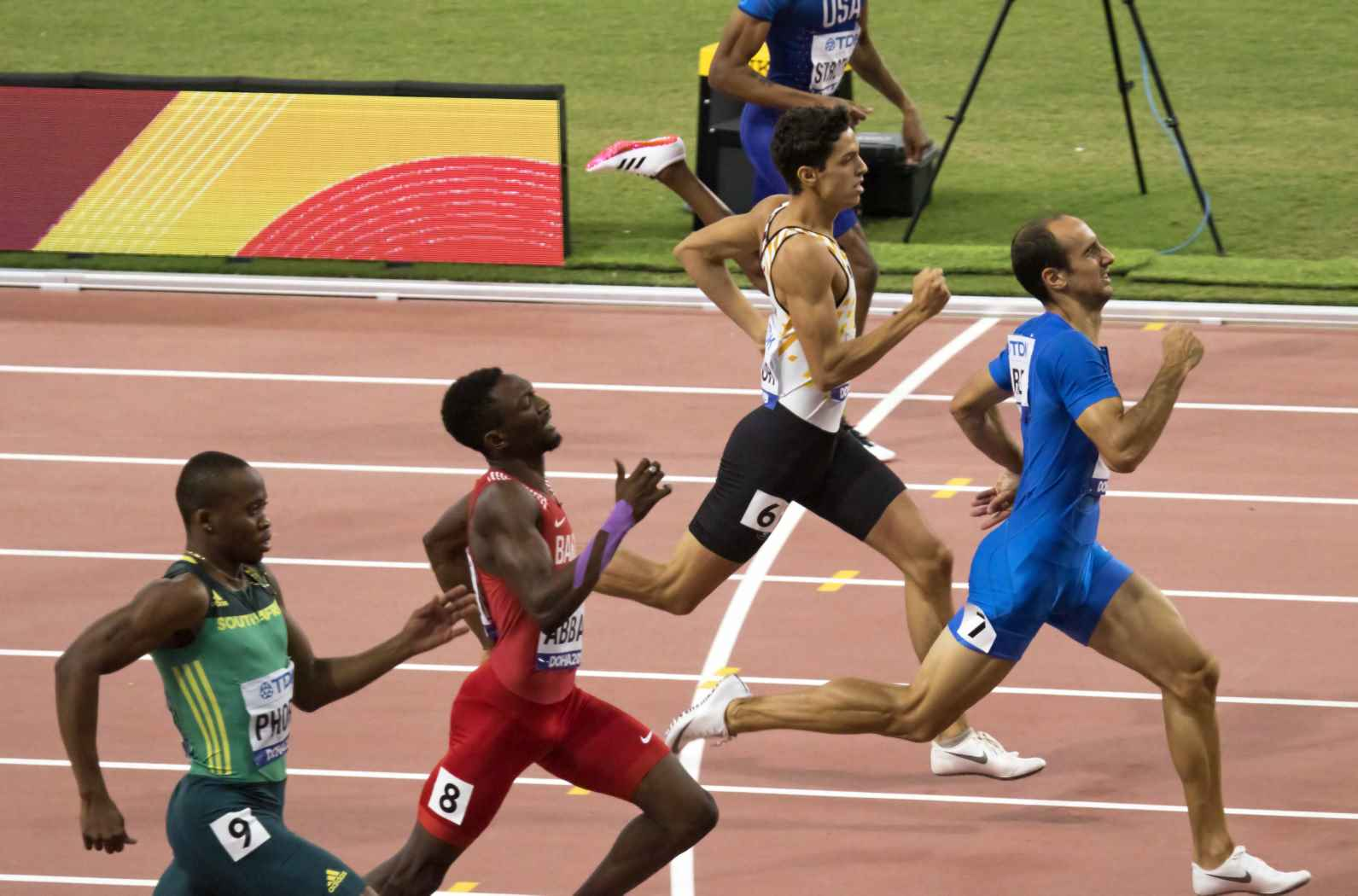

Personal information
- Nationality: Bahraini
- Born: 17 May 1996 (age 30) Kano, Nigeria
- Height: 1.75 m (5 ft 9 in)
- Weight: 66 kg (146 lb)

Sport
- Country: Bahrain
- Sport: Athletics
- Event: 400 metres
Medal record
Men's athletics
Representing Bahrain
World Championships
Bronze medal – third place	2019 Doha	Mixed 4 × 400 m
Asian Games
Silver medal – second place	2014 Incheon	400 m
Asian Indoor Championships
Silver medal – second place	2016 Doha	400 m

Abbas Abubakar Abbas (Arabic: عباس أبو بكر عباس; born 17 May 1996) is a Nigerian-born Bahraini athlete sprinter who competes internationally for Bahrain. He was the silver medallist in the 400 metres at the 2014 Asian Games. He has a personal best of 44.90 seconds for the event.

== Career ==
Born in Kano State, Nigeria, he first established himself at the national level with a runner-up finish over 400 metres at the 2012 Nigerian National Sports Festival, finishing behind Orukpe Erayokan. Less than a month later the 16-year-old Nigerian opted to compete for Bahrain, changing his eligibility to the Middle-East state.

Abbas made his debut for his adopted nation the following year at the 2013 World Youth Championships in Athletics. Running in the 400 m, he managed a personal best in the qualifiers with a time of 46.85 seconds. In the final he originally finished in third place, but was disqualified for a lane infraction. He completed a 200 m/400 m double at the West Asian Youth Athletics Championships three months later.

At the start of following track season he was a double medallist at the Arab Junior Athletics Championships, winning the 200 m and placing second in a Bahraini 1–2 of the 400 m, behind Ali Khamis Abbas. He ran two personal bests in those events at the Plovdiv Memorial Vulpev-Bakchevanov that July, timing 21.25 seconds and 45.93 seconds, respectively. At the 2014 World Junior Championships in Athletics he was a 400 m finalist and despite a slow start managed to take the bronze medal – his first global podium finish. He rose among the senior elite runners at the 2014 Asian Games: two Bahraini junior records came in the qualifiers, first a run of 45.61, then one of 45.17 seconds. He was beaten Youssef Masrahi in the final by over a second, but was still a clear second to take the silver medal at the age of 18. His best time that year ranked him the second fastest junior 400 m runner for the season, just behind world junior champion Machel Cedenio.

== Personal bests ==
- 200 metres – 21.25 seconds (2014)
- 400 metres – 45.17 seconds (2014)
- 400 meters - 44.90 seconds (2019)
