= Yousef Masrahi =

Saudi Arabian sprinter

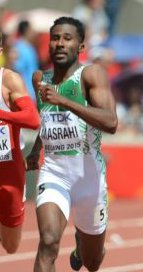
- Masrahi at the 2015 World Championships

Personal information
- Born: 31 December 1987 (age 38) Najran, Saudi Arabia
- Weight: 74 kg (163 lb)

Sport
- Country: Saudi Arabia
- Sport: Athletics
- Event: 400 m
Medal record
Men's athletics
Representing Saudi Arabia
Asian Games
Gold medal – first place	2010 Guangzhou	4 × 400 m relay
Gold medal – first place	2014 Incheon	400 m
Gold medal – first place	2022 Hangzhou	400 m
Bronze medal – third place	2010 Guangzhou	400 m
Bronze medal – third place	2014 Incheon	4 × 400 m relay
Asian Indoor Games
Gold medal – first place	2007 Macau	4 × 400 m relay
Gold medal – first place	2009 Hanoi	4 × 400 m relay
Silver medal – second place	2009 Hanoi	400 m
Asian Championships
Gold medal – first place	2011 Kobe	400 m
Gold medal – first place	2013 Pune	400 m
Gold medal – first place	2013 Pune	4 × 400 m relay
Silver medal – second place	2011 Kobe	4 × 400 m relay
Silver medal – second place	2015 Wuhan	400 m
Silver medal – second place	2015 Wuhan	4 × 400 m relay
Bronze medal – third place	2023 Bangkok	400 m
Military World Games
Gold medal – first place	2015 Mungyeong	400 m
Islamic Solidarity Games
Gold medal – first place	2013 Palembang	400 m
Gold medal – first place	2013 Palembang	4 × 400 m relay
Silver medal – second place	2021 Konya	400 m
Pan Arab Games
Gold medal – first place	2011 Doha	400 m
Gold medal – first place	2011 Doha	4 × 400 m relay
Arab Championships
Gold medal – first place	2009 Damascus	4 × 400 m relay
Gold medal – first place	2013 Doha	400 m
Gold medal – first place	2013 Doha	4 × 400 m relay
Silver medal – second place	2023 Marrakesh	400 m
Bronze medal – third place	2009 Damascus	400 m
GCC Games
Gold medal – first place	2015 Dammam	400 m
Gold medal – first place	2015 Dammam	4 × 400 m relay
Silver medal – second place	2022 Kuwait	4 × 400 m relay
GCC Championships
Gold medal – first place	2009 Qatif	400 m
World Masters Championships
Gold medal – first place	2024 Gothenburg	400 M35
Representing Asia/Pacific
Continental Cup
Bronze medal – third place	2014 Marrakesh	400 m

Yousef Ahmed Masrahi (Arabic: يوسف مسرحي; born 31 December 1987) is a Saudi Arabian track and field athlete, who specialises in the 400 metres sprint. His personal best time for the event (43.93 seconds), set in 2015, is the Asian record.

Masrahi represented his country at the 2012 London Olympics and is a three-time participant at the World Championships in Athletics (2009, 2013, 2015). He was the gold medallist at both the Asian Athletics Championships in 2011 and at the 2014 Asian Games.

Masrahi served a four-year competition ban from 2016 to 2020 for an anti-doping violation related to the use of erythropoietin (EPO).

== Career ==
His first international outing came in middle-distance events at the 2007 Asian Indoor Games. He failed to finish in the 800 metres, but set a national indoor record of 4:11.28 minutes in the 1500 metres heats. He won his first medal at the competition in the 4 × 400 metres relay, taking the gold alongside Hamdan Al-Bishi, Ali Al-Deraan and Hamed Al-Bishi. In the 2008 season he was based in California and began to run in the 200 metres and 400 metres instead, setting best times of 21.80 and 46.45 seconds in the events.

Masrahi won the national title over 200 m in 2009 and improved his 400 m best to 45.84 seconds in Riyadh, gaining the "B" qualifying standard. He represented Saudi Arabia at the 2009 World Championships in Athletics, but was knocked out in the 400 m heats. He was the bronze medalist in the distance at the Arab Athletics Championships and also won the relay title with Saudi Arabia. At the 2009 Asian Indoor Games in November Masrahi was just beaten to the 400 m title by Ismail Al-Sabiani, another Saudi runner, but the pair teamed up in the relay to set a Games record and national record time of 3:10.31 minutes.

The 2010 Asian Games was his focus for the next season and he gained selection after winning a 200/400 m double at the national championships. He ran personal best of 45.48 seconds in the heats of the 400 m at the Asian Games, but was little slower in the final and took the bronze medal. With the relay team he anchored the men home to a Saudi national record of 3:02.30 minutes, running with Al-Sabiani, Mohammed Al-Salhi and Al-Bishi to win the Asian Games title. The next year, he won the 400 m gold medal at the 2011 Asian Athletics Championships in Kobe, Japan, and also won a silver medal in the relay. In 2014, he won the gold medal for the men's 400 m in 44.6 sec.

He set his personal best, the Asian record during the qualifying heats of the 2015 World Championships, finishing barely ahead of Rusheen McDonald who was credited with the same time, 43.93 which at the time ranked both men in the top dozen in history. With two more rounds to run, McDonald was unable to qualify for the final, while Masrahi did, but his remarkable speed was not present in that final where even his personal best would only have been good enough for fourth place.

== Anti-doping violation ==
Masrahi was banned from competition for four years from 15 June 2016 (prior to the 2016 Rio Olympics) to 13 July 2020 due to a failed drug test due to the presence of EPO in his testing sample.

Records
Preceded by Mohammed Al-Malki	Men's 400 m Asian record holder 3 July 2014 – present	Incumbent
