= Athletics at the 2026 Asian Games =

- Venue: Paloma Mizuho Stadium (track and field, marathon start/finish); Aichi Prefectural Government Office and Nagoya City Hall Loop Course (race walk)
- Location: Nagoya, Aichi Prefecture, Japan
- Dates: 23 – 29 September 2026
- Competitors: 777 from 41 nations

Athletics at the 2026 Asian Games was held between 23 and 29 September in two locations in Nagoya. There were a total of 50 medal events across three distinct sets: track and field, road running, and racewalking.

== Schedule ==
The schedule is as follows:

●	1st day	●	Final day	H	Heats	Q	Qualification	S	Semifinals	F	Final

Date →	23rd Wed		24th Thu			25th Fri		26th Sat		27th Sun		28th Mon		29th Tue	
Event ↓	M	E	M	E		M	E	M	E	M	E	M	E	M	E
Men's 100 m				H	S		F								
Men's 200 m								H	S		F				
Men's 400 m							H				F				
Men's 800 m											H				F
Men's 1500 m									H				F		
Men's 5000 m															F
Men's 10,000 m							F								
Men's 110 m hurdles							H				F				
Men's 400 m hurdles											H		F		
Men's 3000 m steeplechase													F		
Men's 4 × 100 m relay											H		F		
Men's 4 × 400 m relay													H		F
Men's marathon								F							
Men's half marathon race walk	F														
Men's marathon race walk										F					
Men's high jump				Q					F						
Men's pole vault															F
Men's long jump							Q				F				
Men's triple jump				F											
Men's shot put											F				
Men's discus throw				F											
Men's hammer throw							F								
Men's javelin throw									Q				F		
Men's decathlon						●		●							
Women's 100 m				H			F								
Women's 200 m									H		F				
Women's 400 m									H				F		
Women's 800 m													H		F
Women's 1500 m									F						
Women's 5000 m													F		
Women's 10,000 m				F											
Women's 100 m hurdles							H		F						
Women's 400 m hurdles											H		F		
Women's 3000 m steeplechase											F				
Women's 4 × 100 m relay													F		
Women's 4 × 400 m relay															F
Women's marathon								F							
Women's half marathon race walk	F														
Women's marathon race walk										F					
Women's high jump															F
Women's pole vault							F								
Women's long jump													F		
Women's triple jump				F											
Women's shot put									F						
Women's discus throw													F		
Women's hammer throw															F
Women's javelin throw											F				
Women's heptathlon				●		●									
Mixed 4 × 100 m relay															F
Mixed 4 × 400 m relay				F											

== Medal summary ==
=== Medal table ===
* Host nation (Japan)

Rank	Nation	Gold	Silver	Bronze	Total
1	China	17	14	8	39
2	Japan*	10	12	10	32
3	Bahrain	9	2	2	13
4	Thailand	3	2	1	6
5	Uzbekistan	3	0	1	4
6	India	1	9	14	24
7	Iran	1	2	1	4
8	Chinese Taipei	1	1	1	3
8	Qatar	1	1	1	3
10	Singapore	1	1	0	2
10	United Arab Emirates	1	1	0	2
12	Philippines	1	0	2	3
13	Sri Lanka	1	0	0	1
14	Kazakhstan	0	4	2	6
15	Oman	0	1	1	2
16	South Korea	0	0	3	3
17	Saudi Arabia	0	0	2	2
18	Vietnam	0	0	1	1
Totals (18 entries)		50	50	50	150

=== Medalists ===
==== Men's events ====
Event	Gold		Silver		Bronze	
100 metres	Puripol Boonson; Thailand	9.90 GR	Ali Anwar Al-Balushi; Oman	10.04 PB	Malham Al-Balushi; Oman	10.11 PB
200 metres	Puripol Boonson; Thailand	19.88 AR	Huang Youwen; China	20.45	Soshi Mizukubo; Japan	20.56
400 metres	Joshua Atkinson; Thailand	44.90 PB	Suleiman Abdulrahman; United Arab Emirates	44.99	Yuki Joseph Nakajima; Japan	45.22
800 metres	Ko Ochiai; Japan	1:44.48 GR	Ali Amirian; Iran	1:45.10 SB	Abubaker Haydar Abdalla; Qatar	1:45.25 PB
1500 metres	Kazuto Iizawa; Japan	3:36.35 GR	Gulveer Singh; India	3:36.72 PB	Nagiya Mori; Japan	3:37.92
5000 metres	Birhanu Balew; Bahrain	13:30.79	Tomonori Yamaguchi; Japan	13:31.43	Gulveer Singh; India	13:32.75
10,000 metres	Birhanu Balew; Bahrain	28:27.51	Gulveer Singh; India	28:29.38	Albert Rop; Bahrain	28:34.38
110 metres hurdles	Chen Yuanjiang; China	13.15	Rachid Muratake; Japan	13.29	John Cabang; Philippines	13.48 SB
400 metres hurdles	Bassem Hemeida; Qatar	47.82	Taiju Goto; Japan	47.93 PB	Lin Chung-wei; Chinese Taipei	48.74 PB
3000 metres steeplechase	Ryuji Miura; Japan	8:17.36 GR	Ryoma Aoki; Japan	8:17.60 PB	Zakaria El-Ahlaami; Qatar	8:18.13
4 × 100 metres relay	China; Chen Jinfeng; Keli Zeng; Wang Shengjie; Xie Zhenye	38.17	Chinese Taipei; Lai Po-hsiang; Chen Wen-pu; Huang Tso-chun; Yang Chun-han	38.32 SB	South Korea; Seo Min-jun; Joeljin Nwamadi; Lee Jae-seong; Daniel Biwesa	38.43 SB
4 × 400 metres relay	Japan; Fuga Sato; Shinya Hayashi; Kenki Imaizumi; Yuki Joseph Nakajima	3:00.75	Qatar; Ammar Ibrahim; Bassem Hemeida; Youssouf Djibrine; Ismail Abakar	3:00.93 SB	India; Dharmveer Choudhary; Manu Thekkinalil Saji; Jay Kumar; Vishal Thennarasu Kayalvizhi	3:01.61
Marathon	Ichitaka Yamashita; Japan	2:10:49	Sawan Barwal; India	2:11:37 PB	Feng Peiyou; China	2:12:13
Half marathon race walk	Shi Shengji; China	1:23:32	Toshikazu Yamanishi; Japan	1:28:01	Choe Byeong-kwang; South Korea	1:28:35
Marathon race walk	Hayato Katsuki; Japan	3:03:36 SB	Zhou Yingcheng; China	3:06:40	Motofumi Suwa; Japan	3:08:57
High jump	Fu Chao-hsuan; Chinese Taipei	2.25 m =SB	Sarvesh Kushare; India	2.25 m	Woo Sang-hyeok; South Korea	2.22 m
Pole vault	EJ Obiena; Philippines	5.91 m GR	Yao Jie; China	5.70 m	Li Chenyang; China	5.70 m
Long jump	Shi Yuhao; China	8.17 m SB	Murali Sreeshankar; India	8.07 m	Anvar Anvarov; Uzbekistan	8.06 m
Triple jump	Su Wen; China	17.42 m GR	Manato Miyao; Japan	16.77 m PB	Ma Yinglong; China	16.75 m
Shot put	Mohammadreza Tayebi; Iran	20.81 m GR	Tajinderpal Singh Toor; India	20.64 m	Mohammed Tolo; Saudi Arabia	20.48 m SB
Discus throw	Abuduaini Tuergong; China	64.26 m	Wu Nanjun; China	61.58 m	Sadegh Samimi; Iran	60.32 m PB
Hammer throw	Sukhrob Khodjaev; Uzbekistan	74.38 m	Shota Fukuda; Japan	71.78 m	Mohammed Al-Dubaisi; Saudi Arabia	71.53 m
Javelin throw	Rumesh Pathirage; Sri Lanka	88.55 m	Yashvir Singh; India	85.72 m PB	Rohit Yadav; India	84.35 m
Decathlon	Yuma Maruyama; Japan	8123 pts	Chen Xinghua; China	8012 pts	Tejaswin Shankar; India	7934 pts

==== Women's events ====
Event	Gold		Silver		Bronze	
100 metres	Chen Yujie; China	11.06 GR	Shanti Pereira; Singapore	11.21 SB	Edidiong Odiong; Bahrain	11.33
200 metres	Shanti Pereira; Singapore	22.78 SB	Chen Yujie; China	22.93	Harita Bhadra; India	23.20
400 metres	Salwa Eid Naser; Bahrain	49.20 GR	Zahra Zarei; Iran	52.38	Prachi Choudhary; India	53.21
800 metres	Wu Hongjiao; China	2:04.49	Nelly Jepkosgei; Bahrain	2:05.16	Victoria Bossong; Philippines	2:05.34
1500 metres	Nelly Jepkosgei; Bahrain	4:04.50 GR	Li Chunhui; China	4:05.50 PB	Nozomi Tanaka; Japan	4:06.14
5000 metres	Winfred Yavi; Bahrain	15:10.18	Nozomi Tanaka; Japan	15:11.65	Parul Chaudhary; India	15:14.61
10,000 metres	Winfred Yavi; Bahrain	32:39.18	Nozomi Tanaka; Japan	32:41.54	Seema Kumari; India	32:50.05
100 metres hurdles	Mako Fukube; Japan	12.74	Hitomi Nakajima; Japan	12.78	Wu Yanni; China	13.12
400 metres hurdles	Mariam Kareem; United Arab Emirates	54.31 GR	Adelina Zems; Kazakhstan	54.58 PB	Vithya Ramraj; India	54.75 PB
3000 metres steeplechase	Winfred Yavi; Bahrain	9:04.36 GR	Norah Jeruto Tanui; Kazakhstan	9:06.82 SB	Parul Chaudhary; India	9:08.67 PB
4 × 100 metres relay	China; Liang Xiaojing; Liu Guoyi; Liu Xiajun; Chen Yujie	42.96	Thailand; Manatsada Sanmano; Sukanda Petraksa; Supanich Poolkerd; Jirapat Khanonta	43.51 SB	Japan; Masumi Aoki; Manaka Miura; Aiko Iki; Midori Mikase	43.52 SB
4 × 400 metres relay	India; Kiran Pahal; Poovamma Machettira; Prachi Choudhary; Vithya Ramraj	3:29.69	Bahrain; Aisha Abdullah; Sufian Abdulghani; Zainab Fyofuoba; Salwa Eid Naser	3:30.21	China; Jiang Yutong; Kong Yingying; Zhou Li; Zuo Siyu	3:31.02
Marathon	Shitaye Habte; Bahrain	2:27:31	Ciren Cuomu; China	2:27:43 SB	Mikuni Yada; Japan	2:27:56
Half marathon race walk	Yang Liujing; China	1:33:40	Kristina Morozova; Kazakhstan	1:35:25	Jiang Yunyan; China	1:35:26
Marathon race walk	Danzeng Quzong; China	3:26:09 PB	Ma Li; China	3:32:26	Yukiko Umeno; Japan	3:34:59
High jump	Barnokhon Sayfullaeva; Uzbekistan	1.90 m	Kristina Ovchinnikova; Kazakhstan	1.87 m	Pooja Singh; India	1.84 m
Pole vault	Misaki Morota; Japan	4.55 m PB	Niu Chunge; China	4.50 m	Baranica Elangovan; India Polina Ivanova; Kazakhstan	4.15 m
Long jump	Huang Yingying; China	6.55 m	Ancy Sojan; India	6.53 m	Tan Mengyi; China	6.46 m
Triple jump	Sharifa Davronova; Uzbekistan	14.35 m PB	Huang Yingying; China	14.12 m =PB	Li Yi; China	13.83 m
Shot put	Song Jiayuan; China	19.40 m SB	Zhang Linru; China	18.14 m	Manpreet Kaur; India	17.17 m
Discus throw	Bin Feng; China	63.83 m	Jiang Zhichao; China	62.25 m SB	Subenrat Insaeng; Thailand	61.43 m SB
Hammer throw	Zhang Jiale; China	78.27 m AR	Zhao Jie; China	74.83 m	Joy McArthur; Japan	68.42 m SB
Javelin throw	Yan Ziyi; China	70.46 m GR	Haruka Kitaguchi; Japan	62.70 m	Sae Takemoto; Japan	62.15 m SB
Heptathlon	Yuri Tanaka; Japan	5920 pts	Nanaka Kajiki; Japan	5673 pts SB	Alina Chistyakova; Kazakhstan	5568 pts

==== Mixed events ====
Event	Gold		Silver		Bronze	
4 × 100 metres relay	China; Chen Jinfeng; Liu Guoyi; Shi Junhao; Chen Yujie	40.78 SB	Thailand; Natawat Iamudom; Supanich Poolkerd; Puripol Boonson; Jirapat Khanonta	40.87 SB	India; Gurindervir Singh; Sneha Gowda; Animesh Kujur; Harita Bhadra	41.06 SB
4 × 400 metres relay	Bahrain; Salwa Eid Naser; Alaa Sami; Musa Isah; Aisha Abdullah	3:12.87; GR	India; Poovamma Machettira; Vishal T. K. Vithya Ramraj; Manu T. S.	3:14.46	Vietnam; Nguyễn Thị Ngọc; Quách Thị Lan; Tạ Ngọc Tưởng; Lê Ngọc Phúc	3:14.54

== Participating nations ==
- Afghanistan (3)
- Bahrain (34)
- Bangladesh (2)
- Bhutan (2)
- Cambodia (3)
- China (72)
- Chinese Taipei (37)
- Hong Kong (38)
- India (79)
- Indonesia (12)
- Iran (11)
- Iraq (2)
- Japan (85) (host)
- Kazakhstan (30)
- Kuwait (8)
- Kyrgyzstan (3)
- Laos (4)
- Lebanon (2)
- Macau (5)
- Malaysia (20)
- Maldives (6)
- Mongolia (14)
- Nepal (6)
- North Korea (5)
- Oman (11)
- Pakistan (7)
- Palestine (4)
- Philippines (26)
- Qatar (46)
- Saudi Arabia (19)
- Singapore (23)
- South Korea (42)
- Sri Lanka (24)
- Tajikistan (3)
- Thailand (32)
- Timor-Leste (3)
- Turkmenistan (3)
- United Arab Emirates (5)
- Uzbekistan (19)
- Vietnam (25)
- Yemen (2)
