= Athletics at the 2022 Asian Games – Men's 400 metres hurdles =

Men's 400 metres hurdles at the 2022 Asian Games
- Venue: Hangzhou Olympic Expo Main Stadium
- Date: 2–3 October 2023
- Competitors: 20 from 15 nations

Medalists
gold medal	Abderrahman Samba	Qatar
silver medal	Bassem Hemeida	Qatar
bronze medal	Xie Zhiyu	China

The men's 400 metres hurdles competition at the 2022 Asian Games took place on 2 and 3 October 2023 at the HOC Stadium, Hangzhou.

== Schedule ==
All times are China Standard Time (UTC+08:00)

Date	Time	Event
Monday, 2 October 2023	10:15	Round 1
Tuesday, 3 October 2023	19:35	Final

== Records ==
Prior to this competition, the existing world, Asian and Games records were as follows.

World Record	Karsten Warholm (NOR)	45.94	Tokyo, Japan	3 August 2021
Asian Record	Abderrahman Samba (QAT)	46.98	Paris, France	30 June 2018
Games Record	Abderrahman Samba (QAT)	47.66	Jakarta, Indonesia	27 August 2018

== Results ==
Legend

- DNS — Did not start
- DSQ — Disqualified

=== Round 1 ===
- Qualification: First 2 in each heat (Q) and the next 2 fastest (q) advance to the final.

==== Heat 1 ====
Rank	Athlete	Time	Notes
1	Abderrahman Samba (QAT)	49.12	Q
2	Santhosh Kumar Tamilarasan (IND)	49.28	Q
3	Yusaku Kodama (JPN)	49.99	q
4	Mohammed Al-Muawi (KSA)	50.23	
5	Dmitriy Koblov (KAZ)	51.13	
6	Abid Razzaq (PAK)	51.51	
—	Leonid Pronzhenko (TJK)	DSQ	

==== Heat 2 ====
Rank	Athlete	Time	Notes
1	Kazuki Kurokawa (JPN)	49.80	Q
2	Xie Zhiyu (CHN)	50.01	Q
3	Natthaphon Dansungnoen (THA)	50.42	
4	Chen Chieh (TPE)	50.85	
5	Mehdi Pirjahan (IRI)	50.95	
6	Calvin Quek (SGP)	51.26	
—	Azzam Abu Bakr (KSA)	DNS	

==== Heat 3 ====
Rank	Athlete	Time	Notes
1	Bassem Hemeida (QAT)	49.44	Q
2	Yashas Palaksha (IND)	49.61	Q
3	Peng Ming-yang (TPE)	49.88	q
4	Marc-Anthony Ibrahim (LBN)	50.23	
5	Eric Cray (PHI)	50.24	
6	Han Se-hyun (KOR)	51.06	

=== Final ===
Rank	Athlete	Time	Notes
1st place, gold medalist(s)	Abderrahman Samba (QAT)	48.04	
2nd place, silver medalist(s)	Bassem Hemeida (QAT)	48.52	
3rd place, bronze medalist(s)	Xie Zhiyu (CHN)	49.16	
4	Kazuki Kurokawa (JPN)	49.21	
5	Yashas Palaksha (IND)	49.39	
6	Santhosh Kumar Tamilarasan (IND)	49.41	
7	Peng Ming-yang (TPE)	50.97	
—	Yusaku Kodama (JPN)	DSQ	
