= Dharmveer Choudhary =

Indian sprinter (born 2001)

Personal information
- Born: 5 February 2001 (age 25) Tonk, Rajasthan, India

Sport
- Sport: Athletics
- Event: 400 metres
Medal record
Men's athletics
Representing India
Asian Games
Bronze medal – third place	2026 Aichi–Nagoya	4×400m
Asian Championships
Silver medal – second place	2025 Gumi	4×400m

Dharmveer Choudhary (born 5 February 2001) is an Indian sprinter who specialises in 400 m events. He has represented India in international athletics competitions, including the 2025 World Athletics Relays and the 2025 Asian Athletics Championships.

== Career ==
Choudhary represented India at the 2025 World Athletics Relays in Guangzhou, China, competing in the men's and mixed 4 × 400 metres relay events.

At the 2025 Asian Athletics Championships in Gumi, South Korea, Choudhary was part of the Indian men's 4 × 400 metres relay team that won the silver medal. The Indian team, consisting of Jay Kumar, Choudhary, Manu Thekkinalil Saji and Vishal Thennarasu Kayalvizhi, finished second in the final with a time of 3:03.67.

== Personal bests ==
Event	Time	Venue	Date
400 metres	45.68	Ranchi, India	22 May 2026

== International competitions ==
Year	Competition	Venue	Event	Result	Time
2025	2025 World Athletics Relays	Guangzhou, China	Mixed 4 × 400 m relay	5th in heat	3:16.85
2025	2025 World Athletics Relays	Guangzhou, China	Men's 4 × 400 m relay	7th	3:04.49
2025	2025 Asian Athletics Championships	Gumi, South Korea	Men's 4 × 400 m relay	2nd	3:03.67
