= 2025 Asian Athletics Championships – Men's 4 × 400 metres relay =

Men's 4 × 400 metres relay at the 2025 Asian Athletics Championships
- Venue: Gumi Civic Stadium
- Location: Gumi, South Korea
- Dates: 29 May
- Winning time: 3:03.52

Medalists
gold medal	Abderrahman Samba; Bassem Hemeida; Hatim Ait Oulghazi; Ammar Ibrahim	Qatar
silver medal	Jay Kumar; Dharmveer Choudhary; Manu Thekkinalil Saji; Vishal Thennarasu Kayalvizhi	India
bronze medal	Liang Baotang; Zhang Qining; Ailixier Wumaier; Fu Haoran	China

The men's 4 × 400 metres relay event at the 2025 Asian Athletics Championships was held on 29 May.

== Schedule ==
The event schedule, in local time (UTC+9), was as follows:

Date	Time	Round
29 May	11:15	Heats
29 May	23:00	Final

== Results ==
=== Heats ===
==== Heat 1 ====
Place	Nation	Athletes	Time	Notes
1	India	Rince Joseph, Dharmveer Choudhary, Manu Thekkinalil Saji, Mohit Kumar	3:06.28	Q, PB
2	China	Liang Baotang, Li Yiqing, Zhang Qining, Fu Haoran	3:06.79	Q
3	South Korea	Kim Ui-yeon, Hyung-gun Song, Hwi-in Jo, Seungkyun Joo	3:10.05	Q
4	Qatar	Ashraf Osman, Hatim Ait Oulghazi, Abdirahman Saeed Hassan, Ammar Ibrahim	3:11.71	q
5	Singapore	Subaraghav Hari Tamil Selvam, Zubin Percy Mucherji, Yan Teo, Harry Irfan Curran	3:16.28	

==== Heat 2 ====
Place	Nation	Athletes	Time	Notes
1	Sri Lanka	Aruna Darshana, Rajitha Niranjan, J.O. Shashintha Silva, Kalhara Idupa	3:07.66	Q
2	Kazakhstan	Andrey Sokolov, Elnur Muchitdinow, Dmitriy Koblov, Mikhail Litvin	3:10.89	Q
3	Malaysia	Muhammad Sayyid Amin bin Roslan, Muhammad Fakrul, Luqmanul Hakim Khairul Akmal, Umar Osman	3:12.33	Q
4	Thailand	Jirateep Bundee, Jirayu Pleenaram, Khunaphat Kaijan, Chutithat Pruksorranan	3:13.58	q, PB

=== Final ===
Place	Nation	Athletes	Time	Notes
1st place, gold medalist(s)	Qatar	Abderrahman Samba, Bassem Hemeida, Hatim Ait Oulghazi, Ammar Ibrahim	3:03.52	
2nd place, silver medalist(s)	India	Jay Kumar, Dharmveer Choudhary, Manu Thekkinalil Saji, Vishal Thennarasu Kayalvizhi	3:03.67	PB
3rd place, bronze medalist(s)	China	Liang Baotang, Zhang Qining, Ailixier Wumaier, Fu Haoran	3:03.73	SB
4	South Korea	Kim Ui-yeon, Seungkyun Joo, Hyung-gun Song, Shin Min-kyu	3:07.20	
5	Sri Lanka	Aruna Darshana, S.M.S.V Rajakaruna, Kalhara Idupa, Kalinga Kumarage	3:08.55	
6	Kazakhstan	Andrey Sokolov,Elnur Muchitdinow, Vyacheslav Zems, Mikhail Litvin	3:11.82	
7	Malaysia	Anas Ariffin, Luqmanul Hakim Khairul Akmal, Umar Osman, Muhammad Sayyid Amin bin Roslan	3:14.55	
8	Thailand	Jirateep Bundee, Jirayu Pleenaram, Khunaphat Kaijan, Chutithat Pruksorranan	3:18.70	
