= Xie Zhiyu (hurdler) =

Chinese athlete (born 2000)

Personal information
- Nationality: Chinese
- Born: 24 March 2000 (age 26)

Sport
- Sport: Athletics
- Event: Hurdles

Achievements and titles
- Personal best: 400m hurdles: 48.78s (2023)
Medal record
Men's athletics
Representing China
Asian Games
| Bronze medal – third place | 2022 Hangzhou | 400 m hurdles |
Summer World University Games
| Bronze medal – third place | 2021 Chengdu | 400 m hurdles |

Xie Zhiyu (born 24 March 2000) is a Chinese hurdler. He was a medalist at the 2022 Asian Games over 400 metres hurdles.

== Career ==
In 2019, he won the Chinese Athletics Championships over 400 metres. He won the 400m hurdles event at China's National Games in 2021. He won a bronze medal at the delayed 2021 Summer World University Games in Chengdu in the 400 metres hurdles.

He competed at the 2023 Asian Athletics Championships in Bangkok in the 400 metres hurdles in July 2023, placing fourth in the final. He competed at the 2023 World Athletics Championships in Budapest, reaching the semi finals. He won a bronze medal at the 2022 Asian Games in Hangzhou in October 2023 over 400 metres hurdles.

He competed at the 2024 Summer Olympics in Paris in August 2024, in the 400 metres hurdles.

== Personal life ==
He graduated from Peking University in July 2023.
