= Athletics at the 2026 Asian Games – Mixed 4 × 400 metres relay =

Mixed 4 × 400 metres relay at the 2026 Asian Games
- Venue: Mizuho Park Athletic Stadium, Nagoya
- Date: 24 September 2026
- Competitors: 44 from 11 nations

Medalists
gold medal	Musa Isah; Aisha Abdullah; Alaa Sami; Salwa Eid Naser	Bahrain
silver medal	Manu T. S. Machettira Poovamma; Vishal T. K. Vithya Ramraj	India
bronze medal	Ta Ngoc Tuong; Quach Thi Lan; Le Ngoc Phuc; Nguyễn Thị Ngọc	Vietnam

The mixed 4 × 400 metres relay competition at the 2026 Asian Games took place on 24 September 2026 at the Mizuho Park Athletic Stadium in Nagoya, Japan. Bahrain won the gold medal with an Asian Games record time of 3:12.87 while India won the silver and Vietnam won the bronze.

== Schedule ==
All times are Japan Standard Time (UTC+09:00)

Schedule
Date	Time	Event
Thursday, 24 September 2026	07:00	Round 1
Thursday, 24 September 2026	18:45	Final

== Records ==
Prior to this competition, the existing world, Asian and Games records were as follows.

World Record	United States	3:07.41	Paris, France	2 August 2024
Asian Record	Bahrain	3:11.82	Doha, Qatar	28 September 2019
Games Record	Bahrain	3:14.02	Hangzhou, China	1 October 2023

== Results ==
=== Qualification ===
First three in each heat (Q) and next two fastest (q) advanced to the final.

==== Heat 1 ====
Rank	Team	Time	Notes
1	Bahrain (BRN); Musa Isah; Aisha Abdullah; Alaa Sami; Salwa Naser	3:15.73	Q
2	Vietnam (VIE); Ta Ngoc Tuong; Nguyen Thi Hang; Le Ngoc Phuc; Nguyen Thi Ngoc	3:16.08	Q
3	Japan (JPN); Kentaro Shirahata; Aoi Teramoto; Kenki Imaizumi; Shizuho Moriyama	3:16.52	Q
4	Philippines (PHI); Gabriel Borado; Victoria Bossong; Michael Del Prado; Naomi Kaylia Johnson	3:19.68	q
5	Thailand (THA); Adisak Pornsompoth; Benny Nontanam; Khunaphat Kaijan; Phichayapha Sukaue	3:23.94	

==== Heat 2 ====
Rank	Team	Time	Notes
1	China (CHN); Liang Baotang; Kong Yingying; Xiao Heng; Jiang Yutong	3:15.97	Q
2	India (IND); Manu T. S. Poovamma Machettira; Jay Kumar; Kiran	3:16.23	Q
3	United Arab Emirates (UAE); Suleiman Abdulrahman; Aminat Kamarudeen; Emmanuel Bamidele; Mariam Kareem	3:17.00	Q
4	South Korea (KOR); Jang Minho; Kim Seoyoon; Shin Minkyu; Lee Ayoung	3:18.66	q
5	Sri Lanka (SRI); Omel Jayathungalage; Balapuwaduge Mendis; Sadew Senarath; Jithma Ambepitiya	3:19.81	
6	Kazakhstan (KAZ); Yefim Tarassov; Alexandra Zalyubovskaya; Mikhail Litvin; Mariya Shuvalova	3:20.14	

=== Final ===
Rank	Team	Time
1st place, gold medalist(s)	Bahrain (BRN); Musa Isah; Aisha Abdullah; Alaa Sami; Salwa Eid Naser	3:12.87 GR
2nd place, silver medalist(s)	India (IND); Manu T. S. Machettira Poovamma; Vishal T. K. Vithya Ramraj	3:14.46
3rd place, bronze medalist(s)	Vietnam (VIE); Ta Ngoc Tuong; Quach Thi Lan; Le Ngoc Phuc; Nguyễn Thị Ngọc	3:14.54
4	Japan (JPN); Kentaro Shirahata; Shizuho Moriyama; Fuga Sato; Yuzuki Nakao	3:15.52
5	China (CHN); Liang Baotang; Kong Yingying; Liu Kai; Zhou Li	3:15.65
6	South Korea (KOR); Jang Minho; Kim Seoyoon; Shin Minkyu; Lee Ayoung	3:19.18
7	Philippines (PHI); Gabriel Borado; Victoria Bossong; Michael Del Prado; Naomi Johnson	3:22.23
-	United Arab Emirates (UAE); Suleiman Abdulrahman; Aminat Kamarudeen; Emmanuel Bamidele; Mariam Kareem	DQ
