= Athletics at the 2026 Asian Games – Women's 800 metres =

Women's 800 metres at the 2026 Asian Games
- Venue: Mizuho Park Athletic Stadium, Nagoya
- Dates: 28 September 2026 (round 1); 29 September 2026 (final)
- Competitors: 14 from 11 nations
- Winning time: 2:04.49 s

Medalists
gold medal	Wu Hongjiao	China
silver medal	Nelly Korir	Bahrain
bronze medal	Victoria Bossong	Philippines

The women's 800 metres competition at the 2026 Asian Games took place from 28 to 29 September 2026 at the Mizuho Park Athletic Stadium in Nagoya, Japan.

== Schedule ==
All times are Japan Standard Time (UTC+09:00)

Schedule
Date	Time	Event
28 September 2026	16:50	Round 1
29 September 2026	16:20	Final

== Records ==
Prior to this competition, the existing world, Asian and Games records were as follows.

World Record	Jarmila Kratochvílová (TCH)	1:53.28	Munich, West Germany	25 July 1983
Asian Record	Liu Dong (CHN)	1:55.54	Beijing, China	8 September 1993
Games Record	Margarita Mukasheva (KAZ)	1:59.02	Incheon, South Korea	30 September 2014

== Results ==
=== Round 1 ===
First three in each heat (Q) and next two fastest (q) advanced to the final.

==== Heat 1 ====
Place	Lane	Athlete	Nation	Time	Notes
1		Ayano Shiomi	Japan	2:02.81	Q
2		Nelly Korir	Bahrain	2:02.92	Q
3		Wu Hongjiao	China	2:03.37	Q
4		Gowthami Jayaraman	India	2:04.31	
5		Park Nayeon	South Korea	2:05.94	PB
6		Takshima Kodithuwakku	Sri Lanka	2:08.06	
7		Enkhmaa Khongorzul	Mongolia	2:16.81	PB

==== Heat 2 ====
Place	Lane	Athlete	Nation	Time	Notes
1		Victoria Bossong	Philippines	2:02.34	Q
2		Li Chunhui	China	2:02.35	Q, PB
3		Sabokhat Samijonova	Uzbekistan	2:02.64	Q
4		Rin Kubo	Japan	2:02.87	q
5		Pooja Olla	India	2:03.20	q
6		Aiana Bolatbekkyzy	Kazakhstan	2:10.26	
7		Anna Korobovtseva	Kyrgyzstan	2:10.52	PB

=== Final ===
Place	Lane	Athlete	Nation	Time	Notes
1st place, gold medalist(s)		Wu Hongjiao	China	2:04.49	
2nd place, silver medalist(s)		Nelly Korir	Bahrain	2:05.16	
3rd place, bronze medalist(s)		Victoria Bossong	Philippines	2:05.34	
4		Rin Kubo	Japan	2:05.46	
5		Ayano Shiomi	Japan	2:05.76	
6		Li Chunhui	China	2:06.39	
7		Pooja Olla	India	2:06.72	
8		Sabokhat Samijonova	Uzbekistan	2:07.23	
