= 2025 Asian Athletics Championships – Women's 800 metres =

Women's 800 metres at the 2025 Asian Athletics Championships
- Venue: Gumi Civic Stadium
- Location: Gumi, South Korea
- Dates: 30 May (heats); 31 May (final)
- Competitors: 16 from 11 nations
- Winning time: 2:00.08 CR

Medalists
gold medal	Wu Hongjiao	China
silver medal	Rin Kubo	Japan
bronze medal	Pooja Olla	India

The women's 800 metres event at the 2025 Asian Athletics Championships was held on 30 and 31 May.

== Records ==
Records before the 2025 Asian Athletics Championships
Record	Athlete (nation)	Time (s)	Location	Date
World record	Jarmila Kratochvílová (TCH)	1:53.28	Munich, West Germany	26 July 1983
Asian record	Liu Dong (CHN)	1:55.54	Beijing, China	9 September 1993
Championship record	Tharushi Karunarathna (SRI)	2:00.66	Bangkok, Thailand	17 July 2023
World leading	Tsige Duguma (ETH)	1:56.64	Shaoxing, China	3 May 2025
Asian leading	Rin Kubo (JPN)	2:00.28	Fukuroi, Japan	3 May 2025

== Schedule ==
The event schedule, in local time (UTC+9), was as follows:

Date	Time	Round
30 May	18:00	Heats
31 May	18:50	Final

== Results ==
=== Heats ===
Held on 30 May. First 3 in each heat (Q) and the next 2 fastest (q) qualified for the final.

==== Heat 1 ====
Place	Athlete	Nation	Time	Notes
1	Shiomi Ayano	Japan	2:04.01	Q, SB
2	Twinkle Chaudhary	India	2:04.21	Q
3	Wu Hongjiao	China	2:04.65	Q, SB
4	Park Na-yeon	South Korea	2:07.67	PB
5	Nguyễn Thị Thu Hà	Vietnam	2:10.04	
6	Amal Al-Roumi	Kuwait	2:15.14	
7	Walaʼ Mohammad Al-Qawasmi	Jordan	2:19.54	
8	Phulmati Rana	Nepal	2:21.13	SB

==== Heat 2 ====
Place	Athlete	Nation	Time	Notes
1	Rin Kubo	Japan	2:02.16	Q, SB
2	Pooja Olla	India	2:02.70	Q, PB
3	Shin So-mang	South Korea	2:05.07	Q, PB
4	Li Chunhui	China	2:05.15	q, PB
5	Bejoy Bernalyn	Philippines	2:06.83	q, PB
6	Irina Levina	Uzbekistan	2:12.22	
7	Haneen Yaqoub	Palestine	2:21.83	PB
8	Mui I Kei	Macau	2:22.62	

=== Final ===
Place	Athlete	Nation	Time	Notes
1st place, gold medalist(s)	Wu Hongjiao	China	2:00.08	CR
2nd place, silver medalist(s)	Rin Kubo	Japan	2:00.42	
3rd place, bronze medalist(s)	Pooja Olla	India	2:01.89	PB
4	Twinkle Chaudhary	India	2:03.33	
5	Shiomi Ayano	Japan	2:03.59	SB
6	Li Chunhui	China	2:06.83	
7	Bernalyn Bejoy	Philippines	2:07.53	
8	Shin So-mang	South Korea	2:08.59	
