= Nguyễn Thị Ngọc =

Vietnamese sprinter

Personal information
- Nationality: Vietnam
- Born: January 6, 2002 (age 24)

Sport
- Sport: Track and field
- Event: 400 m

Achievements and titles
- Personal bests: 400 m: 53.12 (Gumi, 2025); 400 m hurdles: 59.09 (Phnom Penh, 2023)
Medal record
Representing Vietnam
Asian Games
Bronze medal – third place	2026 Aichi–Nagoya	4 × 400 m mixed
Asian Athletics Championships
Gold medal – first place	2023 Bangkok	4 × 400 m relay
Silver medal – second place	2025 Gumi	4 × 400 m relay
SEA Games
Gold medal – first place	2025 Thailand	400 m
Gold medal – first place	2025 Thailand	4 × 400 m relay
Gold medal – first place	2025 Thailand	4 × 400 m mixed
Gold medal – first place	2023 Cambodia	4 × 400 m relay
Bronze medal – third place	2023 Cambodia	400 m hurdles

Nguyễn Thị Ngọc (born 6 January 2002) is a Vietnamese sprinter and hurdler. She won the 400 metres gold medal at the 2025 SEA Games. She has also won medals competing in the 400 metres hurdles and 4 × 400 metres relay, including relay gold at the 2023 Asian Athletics Championships.

== Career ==
From Hà Tĩnh province, she competed for the Ha Tinh youth athletics training center and in 2021, was called up to the Vietnamese national athletics team.

She won the bronze medal in the 400 metres hurdles at the 2023 SEA Games in Cambodia, finishing behind compatriot Nguyễn Thị Huyền. Both were then also part of the Vietnamese gold medal winning 4 × 400 metres relay team at the championships. At the 2023 Asian Athletics Championships, she was a member of the Vietnamese gold medal winning women's 4 × 400 metres relay team. At the delayed 2022 Asian Games held in Hangzhou, China, in 2023, she placed fourth with the Vietnamese women's 4 × 400 metres relay team.

At the 2025 Asian Athletics Championships in Gumi, South Korea, she placed fifth overall in the individual 400 metres, running a personal best 53.12 seconds. She also won the silver medal with the women's 4 × 400 metres relay. In December 2025, she won the 400 m gold medal at the 2025 SEA Games in Thailand, in a time of 52.74 seconds. This came despite suffering an injury earlier in the autumn which made her miss a month of training. After the race she gave thanks to Nguyen Thuan, the head coach of Hà Tĩnh athletics, and to Nguyen Thi Bac, the coach of the Vietnamese national athletics team. At the championships, she also won gold medals in both the women's 4 × 400 metres relay and the mixed 4 × 400 metres relay.

In September 2026, she won the bronze medal in the mixed 4 × 400 metres relay at the 2026 Asian Games in Japan. The Vietnamese team achieved a time of 3:14.54 seconds, setting a new national record.
