= Joshua Atkinson (sprinter) =

Thai sprinter and middle-distance runner (born 2003)

Personal information
- Full name: Joshua Robert Atkinson
- Born: 25 May 2003 (age 23) Sydney, Australia

Sport
- Country: Thailand
- Sport: Athletics
- Events: 400 m, 800 m

Achievements and titles
- Personal bests: 400 m: 44.90 (Nagoya 2026); 800 m: 1:48.18 NR (Hangzhou 2023)
Medal record
Men's athletics
Representing Thailand
Asian Games
Gold medal – first place	2026 Aichi–Nagoya	400 m
SEA Games
Gold medal – first place	2021 Hanoi	400 m
Gold medal – first place	2021 Hanoi	800 m
Gold medal – first place	2021 Hanoi	4 × 400 m relay
Gold medal – first place	2021 Hanoi	Mixed 4 × 400 m relay
Gold medal – first place	2025 Bangkok	400 m
Gold medal – first place	2025 Bangkok	4 × 400 m relay
Silver medal – second place	2025 Bangkok	800 m
Silver medal – second place	2025 Bangkok	Mixed 4 × 400 m relay

Joshua Robert Atkinson (born 25 May 2003) is a Thai sprinter and middle-distance runner who competes primarily in the 400 metres and 800 metres. Born in Sydney, Australia, he developed as an athlete in the Australian junior athletics system before becoming eligible to represent Thailand in international competition in April 2022.

Atkinson won the men's 400 metres at the 2026 Asian Games in a personal best of 44.90 seconds, becoming the first Thai athlete to win an Asian Games title in the event. He also holds the Thai national record in the 800 metres, having run 1:48.18 at the 2022 Asian Games in Hangzhou.

In his first major international competition for Thailand, Atkinson won four gold medals at the 2021 SEA Games in Hanoi, taking the 400 metres, 800 metres, men's 4 × 400 metres relay and mixed 4 × 400 metres relay titles. At the 2025 SEA Games in Bangkok, he won the 400 metres and men's 4 × 400 metres relay and took silver in the 800 metres and mixed 4 × 400 metres relay.

== Early life and junior career ==
Atkinson was born in Sydney, Australia, on 25 May 2003. He spent approximately four years of his childhood in Japan, where he first became interested in running through school sports competitions while also playing football. After returning to Australia with his family in 2011, his parents enrolled him in an athletics club and he began training more seriously.

He initially competed in the 800 and 1500 metres before his coach, Graham Garnett, shifted his focus towards the 400 and 800 metres. As an under-16 athlete, Atkinson ran 1:54.50 to break a New South Wales age-group record in the 800 metres. He subsequently lowered his personal best to 1:50.82 and recorded 47.83 seconds for the 400 metres.

In 2021, Atkinson was selected for an Australian under-20 squad in the 400 metres, 800 metres, men's 4 × 400 metres relay and mixed 4 × 400 metres relay. He continued to compete in New South Wales and, in early 2022, ran 46.60 seconds for the 400 metres, achieving the qualifying standard for the 2022 World Athletics U20 Championships.

== Career ==
=== 2022: Thailand debut and World U20 Championships ===
Atkinson made his major international debut for Thailand at the 2021 SEA Games in Hanoi. He first won the mixed 4 × 400 metres relay with Siripol Punpa, Supanich Poolkerd and Benny Nontanam, with Thailand recording 3:19.29.

He subsequently won the men's 400 metres in 46.44 seconds and the 800 metres in 1:55.75. On the final day of athletics, Atkinson ran the anchor leg as Thailand won the men's 4 × 400 metres relay in 3:07.58, giving him a fourth gold medal at the Games. He was later selected as one of four outstanding athletes of the Games.

At the 2022 World Athletics U20 Championships in Cali, Colombia, Atkinson competed in the 400 metres. He ran 46.13 seconds in the semifinal, a Thai under-20 record, to qualify automatically for the final. He finished fifth in the final in 46.31 seconds.

=== 2023: national 800 metres record ===
Atkinson competed at the 2023 SEA Games in Phnom Penh. He finished fourth in the 400 metres in 46.90 seconds. In the 800 metres heats he recorded 1:54.26 but did not start the final. During the Games, the Athletics Association of Thailand reported that he was affected by a groin injury.

At the 2022 Asian Games, held in Hangzhou later that year, Atkinson concentrated on the 800 metres and relay events. He ran 1:48.18 in the first round, lowering the Thai national record, and reached the final, where he recorded 1:50.50. He was also part of the Thai men's 4 × 400 metres relay team that finished fourth in 3:04.23.

=== 2025: SEA Games ===
At the 2025 SEA Games in Bangkok, Atkinson won the men's 400 metres in 45.13 seconds. The performance was a personal best at the time and broke the SEA Games record.

He earned silver in the mixed 4 × 400 metres relay as Thailand finished in 3:16.56, and later finished second in the men's 800 metres in 1:49.24.

On the final day of the athletics programme, Atkinson ran the anchor leg for Thailand in the men's 4 × 400 metres relay. Thailand won in 3:03.07, setting both a Thai national record and a SEA Games record. Atkinson finished the Games with two gold and two silver medals.

=== 2026: Asian Games champion ===
Atkinson competed in the men's 400 metres at the 2026 Asian Games in Nagoya, Japan. On 26 September, he won the final in a personal best of 44.90 seconds, ahead of the United Arab Emirates' Suleiman Abdulrahman, who ran 44.99, and Japan's Yuki Joseph Nakajima, who finished in 45.22.

The victory was Thailand's first Asian Games gold medal in the men's 400 metres.

== Achievements ==
Information from the World Athletics profile unless otherwise noted.

=== Personal bests ===
Event	Performance	Location	Date	Notes
400 metres	44.90	Nagoya, Japan	26 September 2026	NR
800 metres	1:48.18	Hangzhou, China	2 October 2023	NR

=== International competitions ===
Representing Thailand
Year	Competition	Venue	Position	Event	Time	Notes
2022	SEA Games	Hanoi, Vietnam	1st	400 m	46.44	
2022	SEA Games	Hanoi, Vietnam	1st	800 m	1:55.75	
2022	SEA Games	Hanoi, Vietnam	1st	4 × 400 m relay	3:07.58	
2022	SEA Games	Hanoi, Vietnam	1st	Mixed 4 × 400 m relay	3:19.29	
2022	World U20 Championships	Cali, Colombia	5th	400 m	46.31	
2023	SEA Games	Phnom Penh, Cambodia	4th	400 m	46.90	
2023	SEA Games	Phnom Penh, Cambodia	DNS (f)	800 m	1:54.26 (h)	
2023	Asian Championships	Bangkok, Thailand	6th (sf)	400 m	46.43	
2023	Asian Championships	Bangkok, Thailand	5th	Mixed 4 × 400 m relay	3:22.20	
2023	Asian Championships	Bangkok, Thailand	5th	4 × 400 m relay	3:05.63	
2023	Asian Games	Hangzhou, China	7th	800 m	1:50.50	
2023	Asian Games	Hangzhou, China	4th	4 × 400 m relay	3:04.23	
2025	Asian Championships	Gumi, South Korea	7th (h)	800 m	1:50.91	
2025	SEA Games	Bangkok, Thailand	1st	400 m	45.13	
2025	SEA Games	Bangkok, Thailand	2nd	Mixed 4 × 400 m relay	3:16.56	
2025	SEA Games	Bangkok, Thailand	2nd	800 m	1:49.24	
2025	SEA Games	Bangkok, Thailand	1st	4 × 400 m relay	3:03.07	NR
2026	Asian Games	Nagoya, Japan	1st	400 m	44.90	
