= 2025 Asian Athletics Championships – Mixed 4 × 400 metres relay =

Mixed 4 × 400 metres relay at the 2025 Asian Athletics Championships
- Venue: Gumi Civic Stadium
- Location: Gumi, South Korea
- Dates: 28 May
- Competitors: 32 from 8 nations
- Winning time: 3:18.12

Medalists
| gold medal | Santhosh Kumar Tamilarasan; Rupal Chaudhary; Vishal Thennarasu Kayalvizhi; Subha Venkatesan | India |
| silver medal | Liang Baotang; Wu Hongjiao; Ailixier Wumaier; Liu Yinglan | China |
| bronze medal | S.M.S.V Rajakaruna; Lakshima Mendis; Kalinga Kumarage; Harshani Fernando | Sri Lanka |

The mixed 4 × 400 metres relay event at the 2025 Asian Athletics Championships was held on 28 May.

== Schedule ==
The event schedule, in local time (UTC+9), was as follows:

| Date | Time | Round |
|---|---|---|
| 28 May | 19:40 | Results |

== Results ==
| Place | Nation | Athletes | Time | Notes |
|---|---|---|---|---|
| 1st place, gold medalist(s) | India | Santhosh Kumar Tamilarasan; Rupal Chaudhary; Vishal Thennarasu Kayalvizhi; Subha Venkatesan | 3:18.12 | |
| 2nd place, silver medalist(s) | China | Liang Baotang; Wu Hongjiao; Ailixier Wumaier; Liu Yinglan | 3:20.52 | SB |
| 3rd place, bronze medalist(s) | Sri Lanka | S.M.S.V Rajakaruna; Lakshima Mendis; Kalinga Kumarage; Harshani Fernando | 3:21.95 | |
| 4 | Kazakhstan | Andrey Sokolov; Kristina Korjagina; Mikhail Litvin; Alexandra Zalyubovskaya | 3:22.70 | |
| 5 | South Korea | Shin Min-kyu; Kim Seo-yoon; Joo Seung-kyun; Kim Ju-ha | 3:22.87 | NR |
| 6 | United Arab Emirates | Muath Abdalla; Aminat Kamarudeen; Suleiman Abdulrahman; Mariam Kareem | 3:25.73 | |
| 7 | Thailand | Jirateep Bundee; Arisa Weruwanarak; Jirayu Pleenaram; Benny Nontanam | 3:26.05 | PB |
| 8 | Uzbekistan | Abbos Toshtemirov; Laylo Allaberganova; Hasanbek Rustamjonov; Jonbibi Hukmova | 3:28.67 | PB |
