= Athletics at the 2026 Asian Games – Men's 4 × 400 metres relay =

Men's 4 × 400 metres relay at the 2026 Asian Games
- Venue: Nagoya City Mizuho Park Athletics Stadium
- Date: 28–29 September 2026
- Competitors: 52 from 12 nations

Medalists
gold medal	Fuga Sato; Shinya Hayashi; Kenki Imaizumi; Yuki Joseph Nakajima	Japan
silver medal	Ammar Ibrahim; Bassem Hemeida; Youssouf Djibrine; Ismail Abakar	Qatar
bronze medal	Dharmveer Choudhary; Manu T. S. Jay Kumar; Vishal Thennarasu	India

The men's 4 × 400 metres relay competition at the 2026 Asian Games took place on 28 and 29 September 2026 at the Nagoya City Mizuho Park Athletics Stadium in Nagoya, Japan.

Japan's Fuga Sato, Shinya Hayashi, Kenki Imaizumi and Yuki Joseph Nakajima won the gold medal in 3:00.75. Qatar took silver in a season-best 3:00.93, while India claimed the bronze in 3:01.61.

== Schedule ==
All times are Japan Standard Time (UTC+09:00)

Schedule
Date	Time	Event
28 September 2026	21:20	Round 1 (Heat 1)
28 September 2026	21:31	Round 1 (Heat 2)
29 September 2026	21:17	Final

== Records ==
Prior to this competition, the existing world, Asian and Games records were as follows.

World Record	United States	2:54.29	Stuttgart, Germany	22 August 1993
Asian Record	Japan	2:58.33	Paris, France	10 August 2024
Games Record	Qatar	3:00.56	Jakarta, Indonesia	30 August 2018

== Results ==
Legend

- Q — Qualified by place
- q — Qualified by time
- SB — Season best
- DNS — Did not start
- DQ — Disqualified

=== Qualification ===
First three in each heat (Q) and next two fastest (q) advanced to the final.

==== Heat 1 ====
Rank	Team	Time	Notes
1	Japan (JPN); Fuga Sato; Kentaro Shirahata; Kenki Imaizumi; Shinya Hayashi	3:03.48	Q
2	Vietnam (VIE); Tạ Ngọc Tường; Vũ Ngọc Khánh; Trần Đình Sơn; Lê Ngọc Phúc	3:04.17	Q
3	Philippines (PHI); Frederick Ramirez; Hussein Loraña; Jazzpeer Lanz Arcenal; Michael Del Prado	3:10.58	Q SB
4	Maldives (MDV); Saaid Hassan; Riffath Adam; Hussain Zeek Suad; Zu Iz Mohamed Suad	3:18.54	
—	Singapore (SGP)	DNS	
—	Sri Lanka (SRI); Kalinga Hewa; Pasindu Panambara; Kalhara Kuruwitage; Omel Jayathungalage	DQ	TR17.2.3

==== Heat 2 ====
Rank	Team	Time	Notes
1	India (IND); Dharmveer Choudhary; Rajesh Ramesh; Manu T. S. Jay Kumar	3:01.49	Q
2	Qatar (QAT); Ismail Abakar; Ashraf Osman; Youssouf Djibrine; Ammar Ibrahim	3:01.71	Q SB
3	China (CHN); Ailixi Er Wumai Er; Xiao Heng; Ding Wenhao; Chen Zhisheng	3:02.15	Q
4	Thailand (THA); Sarawut Nuansi; Khunaphat Kaijan; Adisak Pornsompoth; Joshua Atkinson	3:03.07	q =NR
5	South Korea (KOR); Jang Min-ho; Shin Min-kyu; Bae Geon-yul; Lee Jae-ung	3:07.19	q
6	Saudi Arabia (KSA); Meshal Hazazi; Musaad Alsubaie; Azzam Abu Bakr; Mohammed Almuwai	3:08.91	SB

=== Final ===
Rank	Team	Time	Notes
1st place, gold medalist(s)	Japan (JPN); Fuga Sato; Shinya Hayashi; Kenki Imaizumi; Yuki Joseph Nakajima	3:00.75	
2nd place, silver medalist(s)	Qatar (QAT); Ammar Ibrahim; Bassem Hemeida; Youssouf Djibrine; Ismail Abakar	3:00.93	SB
3rd place, bronze medalist(s)	India (IND); Dharmveer Choudhary; Manu T. S. Jay Kumar; Vishal Thennarasu	3:01.61	
4	Thailand (THA); Sarawut Nuansi; Khunaphat Kaijan; Adisak Pornsompoth; Joshua Atkinson	3:01.99	NR
5	China (CHN); Liang Baotang; Xiao Heng; Ding Wenhao; Liu Kai	3:02.27	
6	South Korea (KOR); Jang Min-ho; Shin Min-kyu; Bae Geon-yul; Seo Min-jun	3:06.59	SB
7	Philippines (PHI); Frederick Ramirez; Gabriel Borado; Jazzpeer Lanz Arcenal; Michael Del Prado	3:12.24	
8	Vietnam (VIE); Tạ Ngọc Tường; Vũ Ngọc Khánh; Trần Nhật Hoàng; Lê Ngọc Phúc	3:35.71	
