= 2023 Asian Athletics Championships – Women's 20 kilometres walk =

Women's 20 kilometres walk at the 2023 Asian Athletics Championships
- Venue: National Stadium
- Location: Bangkok, Thailand
- Dates: 16 July
- Competitors: 11 from 7 nations
- Winning time: 1:32:37

Medalists
gold medal	Yang Liujing	China
silver medal	Priyanka Goswami	India
bronze medal	Yukiko Umeno	Japan

The women's 20 kilometres walk event at the 2023 Asian Athletics Championships was held on 16 July.

== Records ==
Records before the 2023 Asian Athletics Championships
Record	Athlete (nation)	Time (s)	Location	Date
World record	Yelena Lashmanova (RUS)	1:23:39	Cheboksary, Russia	9 June 2018
Asian record	Yang Jiayu (CHN)	1:23:49	Huangshan, China	20 March 2021
Championship record	Mayumi Kawasaki (JPN)	1:30:12	Guangzhou, China	13 November 2009
World leading	María Pérez (ESP)	1:25:30	Córdoba, Spain	26 March 2023
Asian leading	Yang Jiayu (CHN)	1:26:41	Huangshan, China	5 March 2023

== Results ==
Rank	Name	Nationality	Time	Notes
1st place, gold medalist(s)	Yang Liujing	China	1:32:37	
2nd place, silver medalist(s)	Priyanka Goswami	India	1:34:24	
3rd place, bronze medalist(s)	Yukiko Umeno	Japan	1:36:17	
4	Miyu Naitho	Japan	1:37:34	
5	Bhawna Jat	India	1:38:26	
6	Galina Yakusheva	Kazakhstan	1:42:05	
7	Jessica Ching Siu Nga	Hong Kong	1:42:13	
8	Su Wenxiu	China	1:45:31	
9	Kotchaporn Tangsriwong	Thailand	1:50:20	PB
10	Puspita Violine Intan	Indonesia	1:55:47	
11	Chonticha Prajakjit	Thailand	2:00:25	PB
