= Wu Hongjiao =

Chinese middle-distance runner

Personal information
- Born: 25 July 2003 (age 23)

Sport
- Sport: Athletics
- Event: Middle-distance running

Achievements and titles
- Personal bests: 800 m: 2:00.08 (Gumi, 2025); 1500 m: 4:11.86 (Guangzhou, 2025)
Medal record
Women's athletics
Representing China
Asian Games
Gold medal – first place	2026 Aichi–Nagoya	800 m
Asian Championships
Gold medal – first place	2025 Gumi	800 m
Silver medal – second place	2025 Gumi	4 × 400 m mixed
Asian Indoor Athletics Championships
Gold medal – first place	2023 Astana	800 m
Gold medal – first place	2026 Tianjin	800 m

Wu Hongjiao (born 25 July 2003) is a Chinese middle-distance runner. She won gold medals at the 2023 and 2026 Asian Indoor Athletics Championships over 800 metres, and gold medals at the 2025 Asian Championships and 2026 Asian Games over that distance.

== Biography ==
She won the gold medal at the 2023 Asian Indoor Championships over 800 metres in Astana, Kazakhstan. She qualified for the final and placed seventh overall in the 800 metres at the 2023 Asian Championships in Bangkok in July 2023. She placed seventh over 800 metres at the delayed 2021 Summer World University Games in the 800 metres, held in Chengdu, China, in August 2023.

She competed at the 2025 World Athletics Indoor Championships in Nanjing, China. She won the 800 metres gold medal at the 2025 Asian Championships in Gumi, South Korea in May 2025, running 2:00.08 to win ahead of Rin Kubo of Japan. She was also a silver medalist at the championships in the Mixed 4 × 400 metres relay.

In September 2025, she competed in the women's 800 metres at the 2025 World Athletics Championships in Tokyo, Japan.

In February 2026, she won the gold medal in the 800 metres at the 2026 Asian Indoor Athletics Championships in Tianjin, China. In September, she won the gold medal in the 800 metres at the 2026 Asian Games in Nagoya, Japan.

== Personal life ==
She is a student at Central China Normal University.
