= 2023 Asian Athletics Championships – Men's 400 metres hurdles =

Men's 400 metres hurdles at the 2023 Asian Athletics Championships
- Venue: National Stadium
- Location: Bangkok, Thailand
- Dates: 14 July (heats & semi-finals); 15 July (final)
- Competitors: 25 from 17 nations
- Winning time: 48.64

Medalists
gold medal	Bassem Hemeida	Qatar
silver medal	Yusaku Kodama	Japan
bronze medal	Santhosh Kumar Tamilarasan	India

The men's 400 metres hurdles event at the 2023 Asian Athletics Championships was held on 14 and 15 July.

== Records ==
Records before the 2023 Asian Athletics Championships
Record	Athlete (nation)	Time (s)	Location	Date
World record	Karsten Warholm (NOR)	45.94	Tokyo, Japan	3 August 2021
Asian record	Abderrahman Samba (QAT)	46.98	Paris, France	30 June 2018
Championship record	Abderrahman Samba (QAT)	47.51	Doha, Qatar	22 April 2019
World leading	Karsten Warholm (NOR)	46.52	Oslo, Norway	15 June 2023
Asian leading	Abderrahman Samba (QAT)	48.56	Savona, Italy	24 May 2023

== Results ==
=== Heats ===
Held on 14 July

Qualification rule: First 3 in each heat (Q) and the next 4 fastest (q) qualified for the semifinals.

Rank	Heat	Name	Nationality	Time	Notes
1	4	Yusaku Kodama	Japan	50.31	Q
2	2	Eric Cray	Philippines	50.39	Q
3	2	Xie Zhiyu	China	50.47	Q
4	3	Santhosh Kumar Tamilarasan	India	50.50	Q
5	1	Palaksha Yashas	India	50.84	Q
6	3	Kaito Tsutsue	Japan	51.01	Q
7	1	Mehdi Pirjahan	Iran	51.11	Q
8	4	Bassem Hemeida	Qatar	51.18	Q
9	1	Peng Ming-yang	Chinese Taipei	51.27	Q
10	4	Chen Chieh	Chinese Taipei	51.37	Q
11	3	Mohamed Dahim Al-Mouaoui	Saudi Arabia	51.46	Q
12	1	Nathapol Dansoongnern	Thailand	51.52	q
13	3	Vyacheslav Zems	Kazakhstan	51.58	q
14	2	Marc Anthony Ibrahim	Lebanon	51.59	Q
15	4	Dmitriy Koblov	Kazakhstan	51.75	q
16	1	Calvin Quek	Singapore	51.96	q
17	1	Rusleen Zikry Putra Roseli	Malaysia	52.52	
18	4	Methasit Krapinu	Thailand	52.76	PB
19	2	Doudai Ismail Abakar	Qatar	53.03	
20	2	Phattanan Thorphathong	Thailand	53.50	
21	2	Zaid Al-Awamleh	Jordan	55.65	PB
22	3	Dilshodbek Boboqulov	Uzbekistan	53.38	
23	4	Muhammad Fakhrul Afizur	Malaysia	54.71	
24	3	Leonid Pronzhenko	Tajikistan	55.30	
25	4	Siphasouk Botvilaithong	Laos	58.51	PB

=== Semifinals ===
Held on 14 July
Qualification rule: First 3 in each heat (Q) and the next 2 fastest (q) qualified for the final.

Rank	Heat	Name	Nationality	Time	Notes
1	2	Yusaku Kodama	Japan	49.45	Q
2	2	Palaksha Yashas	India	49.60	Q
2	2	Xie Zhiyu	China	49.60	Q
4	1	Mehdi Pirjahan	Iran	49.71	Q
5	2	Bassem Hemeida	Qatar	49.81	q
6	1	Eric Cray	Philippines	49.98	Q
7	2	Peng Ming-yang	Chinese Taipei	50.04	q
8	1	Santhosh Kumar Tamilarasan	India	50.06	Q
9	1	Kaito Tsutsue	Japan	50.09	
10	1	Chen Chieh	Chinese Taipei	50.19	
11	1	Mohamed Dahim Al-Mouaoui	Saudi Arabia	50.80	
12	1	Dmitriy Koblov	Kazakhstan	50.81	
13	2	Marc Anthony Ibrahim	Lebanon	51.22	
14	1	Calvin Quek	Singapore	51.82	
15	2	Vyacheslav Zems	Kazakhstan	52.28	
	2	Nathapol Dansoongnern	Thailand	DQ	FS

=== Final ===
Held on 15 July

Rank	Lane	Name	Nationality	Time	Notes
1st place, gold medalist(s)	2	Bassem Hemeida	Qatar	48.64	PB
2nd place, silver medalist(s)	6	Yusaku Kodama	Japan	48.96	
3rd place, bronze medalist(s)	7	Santhosh Kumar Tamilarasan	India	49.09	
4	4	Xie Zhiyu	China	49.19	PB
5	3	Mehdi Pirjahan	Iran	49.55	
6	8	Eric Cray	Philippines	49.76	
7	1	Peng Ming-yang	Chinese Taipei	50.33	
	5	Palaksha Yashas	India	DNS	
