= Athletics at the 2026 Asian Games – Women's marathon race walk =

Women's marathon race walk at the 2026 Asian Games
- Venue: Aichi-Nagoya Race Walking Course, Aichi Prefecture
- Date: 27 September 2026
- Competitors: 7 from 4 nations
- Winning time: 3:26:09 PB

Medalists
gold medal	Danzeng Quzong	China
silver medal	Ma Li	China
bronze medal	Yukiko Umeno	Japan

The women's marathon race walk competition at the 2026 Asian Games took place on 27 September 2026 at the Aichi-Nagoya Race Walking Course in Aichi Prefecture, Japan. Yasmina Toxanbayeva of Kazakhstan originally won the gold medal, but later disqualified due to the shoes worn by the Kazakhstani athlete did not meet the applicable requirements. Danzeng Quzong from Tibet, China, finally won the gold medal, her teammate Ma Li won the silver medal.

== Schedule ==
All times are Japan Standard Time (UTC+09:00)

Schedule
Date	Time	Event
27 September	07:30	Final

== Results ==
Key:	~ Red card for loss of contact	> Red card for bent knee

Place	Athlete	Nation	Time	Red cards	Notes
1st place, gold medalist(s)	Danzeng Quzong	China	3:26:09		PB
2nd place, silver medalist(s)	Ma Li	China	3:32:26	>~~	
3rd place, bronze medalist(s)	Yukiko Umeno	Japan	3:34:59		
4	Maika Yagi	Japan	3:36:40		
5	Manju Rani	India	3:40:17	>>>	
—	Yasmina Toxanbayeva	Kazakhstan	DQ	~	TR7.1[TR5.2]
—	Priyanka Goswami	India	DQ	~>~>	TR54.7.5
