= Kaito Tsutsue =

Japanese athlete (born 1998)

Personal information
- Nationality: Japanese
- Born: 2 July 1998 (age 27)

Sport
- Sport: Athletics
- Event: Hurdles

Achievements and titles
- Personal best(s): 400m hurdles: 48.58 (Osaka, 2024)

Kaito Tsutsue (筒江 海斗, born 2 July 1998) is a Japanese hurdler. He was selected for the 2024 Paris Olympics in the 400 metres hurdles.

== Career ==
He competed at the 2023 Asian Athletics Championships in Bangkok in the 400 metres hurdles in July 2023.

He placed third at the Golden Grand Prix in 2024 running 48.92 seconds for the 400 metres hurdles. He set a new personal best and met the minimum standard for the 2024 Olympics with a time of 48.58 seconds at the Kinami Memorial race in Osaka in May 2024. He finished third at the Japanese Athletics Championships in June 2024.

He competed at the 2024 Summer Olympics in Paris in August 2024, in the 400 metres hurdles.

== Personal life ==
He graduated from Fukuoka University.
