= Sawan Barwal =

Indian marathoner (born 1998)

Personal information
- Born: 18 February 1998 (age 28) Radabhanker, Himachal Pradesh, India
- Military career
- Branch: Indian Army
- Service years: 2019–present
- Rank: Havildar
- Unit: Corps of Engineers

Sport
- Sport: Athletics
- Event: Marathon

Achievements and titles
- Personal bests: 2:11:37 NR (2026)
Medal record
Men's athletics
Representing India
Asian Games
Silver medal – second place	2026 Aichi–Nagoya	Marathon

Sawan Barwal (born 18 February 1998) is an Indian marathoner. He won the silver medal at the 2026 Asian Games. He broke Shivnath Singh's 48 year old Indian National marathon record.

== Early life ==
Barwal is from Radabhanker village in Mandi district of Himachal Pradesh. He serves in the Indian Army as havildar in the Corps of Engineers. A long distance runner and half marathoner, he switched over to marathon following a suggestion from fellow Army personnel and mentor Mohammed Yunus Khan. For Asiad, he is training at the Reliance Foundation Centre, Coonoor, Tamil Nadu. He is coached by Ajit Markose. Earlier, he trained under Army coach Younis Khan at the Army Sports Institute in Pune.

== Career ==
Barwal broke the Indian national record on 12 April 2026 at NN Marathon Rotterdam that was held in the name of Shivnath Singh for 48 years. He clocked 2 hours, 11 minutes and 58 seconds in the elite marathon race and broke the record of 2:12:00 set by Singh in 1978 at Jalandhar, Punjab. It was his debut marathon and he finished overall 20th. He fell down about 150 metres before the finish line but recovered to break the longest-standing Indian athletics record.

In 2024, he set the National half marathon record of 1:02 in Delhi. In April 2025, he won the gold in the 10,000 metre run with a meet record at the 28th National Federation Senior Athletics Championship at Kochi to qualify for Asian Athletics Championships in Gumi, South Korea in May.
