= Athletics at the 2026 Asian Games – Men's 400 metres =

Men's 400 metres at the 2026 Asian Games
- Venue: Mizuho Park Athletic Stadium, Nagoya
- Dates: 25 September 2026 (round 1); 26 September 2026 (final)
- Competitors: 26 from 18 nations
- Winning time: 44.90 s PB

Medalists
gold medal	Joshua Atkinson	Thailand
silver medal	Suleiman Abdulrahman	United Arab Emirates
bronze medal	Yuki Joseph Nakajima	Japan

The men's 400 metres competition at the 2026 Asian Games took place on 25 and 26 September 2026 at the Nagoya City Mizuho Park Athletic Stadium in Nagoya, Japan. In total, 26 athletes from 17 countries took part in the event.

Joshua Atkinson of Thailand won the gold medal in a time of 44.90 s. Suleiman Abdulrahman of the United Arab Emirates ran 44.99 s to win the silver medal and Yuki Joseph Nakajima of Japan set a time of 45.22 s to win the bronze medal. In winning the competition, Atkinson set a new Thai national record for the event.

== Background ==
The atletics events were held at the Nagoya City Mizuho Park Athletic Stadium in Nagoya, Japan from 23 to 29 September 2026.

Yousef Masrahi of Saudi Arabia was the defending champion after winning the gold medal at the 2022 Asian Games in Hangzhou.

== Round 1 ==
The heats took place on 25 September at 6.13pm. The two fastest athletes from each heat plus the next two fastest advanced to the final. Vishal Thennarasu Kayalvizhi set the fastest time (45.27 s) in the first round. Other medal contenders Joshua Atkinson ran 45.30 s and Ammar Ibrahim ran 45.31 s. Yuki Joseph Nakajima, Suleiman Abdulrahman and Shinya Hayashi also advanced to the final as winners and runners-up from their heats. Emmanuel Bamidele and Kalinga Kumarage advanced to the final as the next two fastest runners.

=== Heat 1 ===
Place	Lane	Athlete	Nation	Time	Notes
1	4	Joshua Atkinson	Thailand	45.30	Q, SB
2	5	Yuki Joseph Nakajima	Japan	45.53	Q
3	7	Emmanuel Bamidele	United Arab Emirates	45.67	q
4	6	Ashraf Osman	Qatar	45.93	
5	8	Liu Kai	China	46.37	
6	2	Abbosbek Toshtemirov	Uzbekistan	47.76	
7	3	Gabriel Borado	Philippines	48.14	
8	1	Riffath Adam	Maldives	49.61	
9	9	Paseel Salme Thaeer	Palestine	49.68	PB

=== Heat 2 ===
Place	Lane	Athlete	Nation	Time	Notes
1	7	Vishal Thennarasu Kayalvizhi	India	45.27	Q
2	5	Ammar Ibrahim	Qatar	45.31	Q
3	6	Kalinga Kumarage	Sri Lanka	45.74	q
4	3	Sarawut Nuansi	Thailand	46.25	PB
5	4	Shin Min-kyu	South Korea	46.39	
6	8	Umar Osman	Malaysia	46.91	
7	2	Michael del Prado	Philippines	48.13	
8	1	Andrey Sokolov	Kazakhstan	48.42	
9	9	Zeek Suad Hussain	Maldives	50.77	

=== Heat 3 ===
Place	Lane	Athlete	Nation	Time	Notes
1	6	Suleiman Abdulrahman	United Arab Emirates	45.56	Q
2	8	Shinya Hayashi	Japan	45.57	Q
3	5	Tạ Ngọc Tường	Vietnam	46.07	
4	9	Musa Isah	Bahrain	46.38	
5	7	Kalhara Idupa Kuruwitage	Sri Lanka	46.53	
6	4	Chun Ho Chan	Hong Kong	46.55	PB
7	2	Bae Geon-yul	South Korea	47.04	SB
8	3	Elnur Muchitdinow	Kazakhstan	47.30	

== Final ==
The final took place on 26 September at 6.33pm. Atkinson ran a new Thai record time of 44.90 s to win the gold medal. Abdulrahman ran 44.99 s to win the silver medal and Nakajima ran 45.22 to win the bronze medal.

Place	Lane	Athlete	Nation	Time	Notes
1st place, gold medalist(s)	5	Joshua Atkinson	Thailand	44.90	NR
2nd place, silver medalist(s)	7	Suleiman Abdulrahman	United Arab Emirates	44.99	
3rd place, bronze medalist(s)	4	Yuki Joseph Nakajima	Japan	45.22	
4	8	Ammar Ibrahim	Qatar	45.35	
5	6	Vishal Thennarasu Kayalvizhi	India	45.48	
6	9	Shinya Hayashi	Japan	45.77	
7	2	Emmanuel Bamidele	United Arab Emirates	45.97	
8	3	Kalinga Kumarage	Sri Lanka	46.31	
