= Ailixier Wumaier =

Chinese sprinter (born 2006)

Personal information
- Nationality: Chinese
- Born: 25 May 2006 (age 20) Baicheng County, Xinjiang, China

Sport
- Country: China
- Sport: Track and field
- Event(s): 200 m, 400 m, 4×400 m relay

Achievements and titles
- Personal bests: 200 m: 20.72 (2024); 400 m: 45.53 (2024)
Medal record
Men's athletics
Representing China
World U20 Championships
| Bronze medal – third place | 2024 Lima | Mixed 4 × 400m relay |
Asian Championships
| Silver medal – second place | 2025 Gumi | Mixed 4 × 400m relay |
| Bronze medal – third place | 2025 Gumi | 4 × 400m relay |
Asian U20 Championships
| Gold medal – first place | 2024 Dubai | 400 m |
| Gold medal – first place | 2024 Dubai | Mixed 4 × 400m relay |
East Asian Youth Games
| Gold medal – first place | 2023 Ulaanbaatar | 200 m |

Ailixier Wumaier (Chinese: 艾力西尔·吾买尔; pinyin: Àilìxīěr Wúmǎiěr; Uyghur: ئەلشىر ئۆمەر; born 15 May 2006) is a Chinese sprinter.

== Background ==
Wumaier was born on 25 May 2006 to a wealthy Uyghur family where his parents were town leaders. This gave him the opportunity to be exposed to many sports at a young age.

Wumaier's favourite sport is running. He was scouted out by the sports bureau of Xinjiang and Wumaier soon after joined a sports school to begin his professional training.

On 31 March 2024, Wumaier won the 400 metres event at the Chinese National Athletics Indoor Championships and broke the indoor national record with a time of 45.79 seconds.

At the 2024 Asian U20 Athletics Championships, Wumaier won the 400 metres event and set a championship record of 45.53 seconds.

Wumaier's favorite athlete is Su Bingtian.
