= Athletics at the 2026 Asian Games – Men's marathon =

Men's marathon at the 2026 Asian Games
- Venue: Mizuho Park Athletic Stadium, Nagoya
- Date: 26 September 2026
- Competitors: 19 from 14 nations
- Winning time: 2:10:49

Medalists
gold medal	Ichitaka Yamashita	Japan
silver medal	Sawan Barwal	India
bronze medal	Feng Peiyou	China

The men's marathon competition at the 2026 Asian Games took place on 26 September 2026 at the Mizuho Park Athletic Stadium in Nagoya, Japan. Ichitaka Yamashita of Japan won the gold medal, Sawan Barwal of India won the silver and Feng Peiyou of China won the bronze.

== Schedule ==
All times are Japan Standard Time (UTC+09:00)

Schedule
Date	Time	Event
26 September 2026	07:30	Final

== Records ==
Prior to this competition, the existing world, Asian and Games records were as follows.

World Record	Sabastian Sawe (KEN)	1:59:30	London, United Kingdom	25 April 2026
Asian Record	El Hassan El Abbassi (BHR)	2:04:43	Valencia, Spain	1 December 2018
Games Record	Takeyuki Nakayama (JPN)	2:08:21	Seoul, South Korea	4 September 1986

== Results ==
Place	Athlete	Nation	Time	Notes
1st place, gold medalist(s)	Ichitaka Yamashita	Japan	2:10:49	
2nd place, silver medalist(s)	Sawan Barwal	India	2:11:37	NR
3rd place, bronze medalist(s)	Feng Peiyou	China	2:12:13	
4	Han Il-ryong	North Korea	2:12:21	
5	El-Hassan El-Abbassi	Bahrain	2:12:45	
6	Robi Syianturi	Indonesia	2:13:12	
7	Shadrack Kimutai Koech	Kazakhstan	2:14:07	
8	Park Min-ho	South Korea	2:15:35	
9	Shokhrukh Davlyatov	Uzbekistan	2:17:44	
10	Hongrok Kim	South Korea	2:18:27	
11	Yūya Yoshida	Japan	2:18:33	
12	Jia Erenjia	China	2:19:18	
13	Tae Ho-jong	North Korea	2:20:07	SB
14	Richard Salaño	Philippines	2:20:34	
15	Vincent Lam	Hong Kong	2:22:04	SB
16	Olonbayar Jamsran	Mongolia	2:22:15	
17	Kartik Karkera	India	2:22:41	
18	Dambadarjaagiin Gantulga	Mongolia	2:22:54	
19	Khadka Khadka	Nepal	2:23:42	
