= Athletics at the 2026 Asian Games – Men's triple jump =

Men's triple jump at the 2026 Asian Games
- Venue: Mizuho Park Athletic Stadium, Nagoya
- Date: 26 September 2026
- Competitors: 13 from 10 nations
- Winning distance: 17.42 m GR

Medalists
gold medal	Su Wen	China
silver medal	Miyao Manato	Japan
bronze medal	Ma Yinglong	China

The men's triple jump competition at the 2026 Asian Games took place on 26 September 2026 at the Mizuho Park Athletic Stadium in Nagoya, Japan. Su Wen of China won the gold medal with a Games Record of 17.42 metres, while Miyao Manato of Japan and Ma Yinglong of China won the silver and bronze medals respectively.

== Schedule ==
All times are Japan Standard Time (UTC+09:00)

Schedule
Date	Time	Event
26 September 2026	17:05	Final

== Records ==
Prior to this competition, the existing world, Asian and Games records were as follows.

World Record	Jonathan Edwards (GBR)	18.29	Gothenburg, Sweden	7 July 1995
Asian Record	Wu Ruiting (CHN)	17.68	Quzhou, China	3 August 2025
Games Record	Zou Sixin (CHN)	17.31	Beijing, China	2 October 1990

== Results ==
Rank	Athlete	Attempt						Result	Notes
Rank	Athlete	1	2	3	4	5	6	Result	Notes
1st place, gold medalist(s)	Su Wen (CHN)	X +0.9	16.97 −0.6	17.42 −0.2				17.42	GR
2nd place, silver medalist(s)	Miyao Manato (JPN)	X +0.1	16.04 −0.1	16.77 +0.9				16.77	PB
3rd place, bronze medalist(s)	Ma Yinglong (CHN)	16.75 +0.5	16.70 −0.4	X +0.5	X +0.1	r		16.75	
4	Kim Jang-woo (KOR)	16.06 +0.5	14.96 +0.2	16.20 −0.6	X +0.5	16.50 +0.1	15.74 +0.0	16.50	
5	Makhkamov Ibrohim (UZB)	16.17 −0.5	X −0.2	16.21 +0.5	X −0.1	X +0.2	15.77 −0.4	16.21	
6	Karthik Unnikrishnan (IND)	15.74 +0.4	15.62 −0.1	15.96 +0.9	X +0.4	15.33 +0.2	16.02 −0.5	16.02	
7	Mohammad Alsalami (SYR)	15.68 −0.6	15.58 +0.6	15.90 +0.5	15.58 +0.1	X −0.2	X −0.4	15.90	
8	Hồ Trọng Mạnh (VIE)	15.17 +0.1	X −0.6	15.82 +0.0	15.32 +0.3	X +0.0	X	15.82	
9	Lee Gabriel (SGP)	15.58 +0.0	15.37 −1.1	15.71 −0.3				15.71	
10	Kim Donghyuk (KOR)	15.58 +0.5	15.30 +0.4	15.52 +0.6				15.58	
11	Li Yun-chen (TPE)	15.36 −0.4	15.51 +0.1	15.57 +0.6				15.57	
12	Salim Al Rawahi (OMA)	X +0.2	X +0.1	15.03 −1.0				15.03	
	Praveen Chithravel (IND)	X +0.7	r					NM	
