= Athletics at the 2026 Asian Games – Women's heptathlon =

Women's heptathlon at the 2026 Asian Games
- Venue: Nagoya City Mizuho Park Athletics Stadium
- Date: 24–25 September 2026
- Competitors: 10 from 8 nations
- Winning score: 5920 pts

Medalists
gold medal	Yuri Tanaka	Japan
silver medal	Nanaka Kajiki	Japan
bronze medal	Alina Chistyakova	Kazakhstan

The women's heptathlon competition at the 2026 Asian Games took place on 24 and 25 September 2026 at the Nagoya City Mizuho Park Athletics Stadium, Nagoya, Japan.

Japan's Yuri Tanaka won the gold medal with 5,920 points, leading a Japanese one–two ahead of teammate Nanaka Kajiki, who took silver with a season-best 5,673 points, while Kazakhstan's Alina Chistyakova claimed bronze with 5,568 points.

== Schedule ==
All times are Japan Standard Time (UTC+09:00)

Date	Time	Event
Thursday, 24 September 2026	10:00	100 metres hurdles
Thursday, 24 September 2026	10:40	High jump
Thursday, 24 September 2026	19:05	Shot put
Thursday, 24 September 2026	21:00	200 metres
Friday, 25 September 2026	10:00	Long jump
Friday, 25 September 2026	11:25	Javelin throw
Friday, 25 September 2026	20:11	800 metres

== Records ==
Prior to this competition, the existing world, Asian and Games records were as follows.

World Record	Jackie Joyner-Kersee (USA)	7291	Seoul, South Korea	24 September 1988
Asian Record	Ghada Shouaa (SYR)	6942	Götzis, Austria	24 September 1988
Games Record	Ghada Shouaa (SYR)	6360	Hiroshima, Japan	11 October 1994

== Results ==
Legend

- DNF — Did not finish
- DNS — Did not start
- DQ — Disqualified
- PB — Personal best
- SB — Season best

=== 100 metres hurdles ===
- Wind: Heat 1: −0.4 m/s, Heat 2: +0.0 m/s

Rank	Athlete	Time	Points	Notes
1	Nanaka Kajiki (JPN)	13.17	1099	
2	Emilia Nova (INA)	13.53	1046	
3	Fatemeh Mohitizadeh (IRI)	13.64	1030	
4	Yuri Tanaka (JPN)	13.99	980	
5	Alina Chistyakova (KAZ)	14.21	949	
6	Chen Cai-juan (TPE)	14.28	939	
7	Ugiloy Norboeva (UZB)	14.36	928	
8	Pooja (IND)	14.61	894	
9	Hoàng Thanh Giang (VIE)	14.78	871	
10	Anamika Kozhinjaparambil (IND)	14.80	868	

=== High jump ===
Rank	Athlete	Attempt							Result	Points	Notes
Rank	Athlete	1.50	1.53	1.56	1.59	1.62	1.65	1.68	Result	Points	Notes
Rank	Athlete	1.71	1.74	1.77	1.80	1.83			Result	Points	Notes
1	Fatemeh Mohitizadeh (IRI)	–	–	–	–	O	O	O	1.77	941	
1	Fatemeh Mohitizadeh (IRI)	O	XXO	O	XXX				1.77	941	
2	Anamika Kozhinjaparambil (IND)	–	–	O	O	O	XO	XO	1.74	903	
2	Anamika Kozhinjaparambil (IND)	XXO	XXO	XXX					1.74	903	
3	Ugiloy Norboeva (UZB)	–	–	–	O	O	O	O	1.71	867	
3	Ugiloy Norboeva (UZB)	XO	XXX						1.71	867	
4	Hoàng Thanh Giang (VIE)	–	–	O	O	O	O	XO	1.71	867	
4	Hoàng Thanh Giang (VIE)	XO	XXX						1.71	867	
=4	Pooja (IND)	–	–	O	–	O	XO	O	1.71	867	
=4	Pooja (IND)	XO	XXX						1.71	867	
6	Alina Chistyakova (KAZ)	O	O	O	O	XO	XXO	O	1.71	867	
6	Alina Chistyakova (KAZ)	XO	XXX						1.71	867	
7	Chen Cai-juan (TPE)	–	–	–	O	O	O	XXO	1.68	830	
7	Chen Cai-juan (TPE)	XXX							1.68	830	
8	Yuri Tanaka (JPN)	–	–	O	O	O	XXO	XXO	1.68	830	
8	Yuri Tanaka (JPN)	XXX							1.68	830	
9	Nanaka Kajiki (JPN)	O	O	O	O	O	XXX		1.62	759	
10	Emilia Nova (INA)	XXO	XO	O	O	XXX			1.59	724	

=== Shot put ===
Rank	Athlete	Attempt			Result	Points	Notes
Rank	Athlete	1	2	3	Result	Points	Notes
1	Chen Cai-juan (TPE)	12.45	12.73	12.18	12.73	709	
2	Fatemeh Mohitizadeh (IRI)	11.72	11.57	11.64	11.72	643	
3	Yuri Tanaka (JPN)	11.43	11.67	10.98	11.67	639	
4	Pooja (IND)	11.20	9.19	11.44	11.44	624	
5	Emilia Nova (INA)	10.88	11.39	10.58	11.39	621	
6	Alina Chistyakova (KAZ)	X	X	11.27	11.27	613	
7	Ugiloy Norboeva (UZB)	11.23	11.21	10.83	11.23	610	
8	Anamika Kozhinjaparambil (IND)	10.62	10.87	11.15	11.15	605	
9	Nanaka Kajiki (JPN)	11.08	10.42	10.04	11.08	600	
10	Hoàng Thanh Giang (VIE)	9.38	9.35	9.20	9.38	489	

=== 200 metres ===
- Wind: Heat 1: −0.8 m/s, Heat 2: −0.4 m/s

Rank	Athlete	Time	Points	Notes
1	Nanaka Kajiki (JPN)	24.84	902	
2	Alina Chistyakova (KAZ)	24.90	896	
=3	Emilia Nova (INA)	25.16	872	
=3	Fatemeh Mohitizadeh (IRI)	25.16	872	
5	Yuri Tanaka (JPN)	25.60	833	
6	Chen Cai-juan (TPE)	25.77	817	
7	Hoàng Thanh Giang (VIE)	25.79	816	
8	Anamika Kozhinjaparambil (IND)	25.96	801	
9	Pooja (IND)	26.27	774	
10	Ugiloy Norboeva (UZB)	26.32	769	

=== Long jump ===
Rank	Athlete	Attempt			Result	Points	Notes
Rank	Athlete	1	2	3	Result	Points	Notes
1	Alina Chistyakova (KAZ)	5.79 +0.6	5.88 −0.1	5.69 +0.4	5.88	813	
2	Hoàng Thanh Giang (VIE)	X +0.0	5.84 +0.3	X +0.4	5.84	801	
3	Yuri Tanaka (JPN)	5.80 +1.0	5.50 −0.6	X +1.3	5.80	789	
4	Chen Cai-juan (TPE)	5.66 +0.5	X +0.2	5.53 −0.5	5.66	747	
5	Anamika Kozhinjaparambil (IND)	5.62 +0.1	5.46 −0.3	5.55 −0.7	5.62	735	
6	Ugiloy Norboeva (UZB)	X +0.7	5.46 +0.3	5.54 +0.0	5.54	712	
7	Emilia Nova (INA)	X −0.4	5.23 +0.5	5.49 +0.8	5.49	697	
8	Nanaka Kajiki (JPN)	X +0.8	5.48 +0.4	5.48 −0.3	5.48	694	
9	Pooja (IND)	5.18 +0.8	5.09 −0.4	5.46 −0.1	5.46	688	
—	Fatemeh Mohitizadeh (IRI)	5.85 +0.1	5.97 +0.1	5.91 +0.3	DQ	0	TR7.1

=== Javelin throw ===
Rank	Athlete	Attempt			Result	Points	Notes
Rank	Athlete	1	2	3	Result	Points	Notes
1	Yuri Tanaka (JPN)	54.29	48.50	55.39	55.39	965	
2	Nanaka Kajiki (JPN)	46.88	43.36	45.83	46.88	800	
3	Ugiloy Norboeva (UZB)	43.68	43.93	40.83	43.93	743	
4	Chen Cai-juan (TPE)	38.20	39.81	38.90	39.81	664	
5	Emilia Nova (INA)	36.99	39.69	X	39.69	661	
6	Pooja (IND)	38.98	38.08	37.13	38.98	648	
7	Alina Chistyakova (KAZ)	36.89	31.33	33.03	36.89	608	
8	Hoàng Thanh Giang (VIE)	31.55	32.06	30.58	32.06	516	
9	Anamika Kozhinjaparambil (IND)	29.78	29.54	X	29.78	472	
—	Fatemeh Mohitizadeh (IRI)	DQ				0	

=== 800 metres ===
Rank	Athlete	Time	Points	Notes
1	Yuri Tanaka (JPN)	2:15.61	884	
2	Pooja (IND)	2:16.43	873	
3	Anamika Kozhinjaparambil (IND)	2:18.06	850	
4	Alina Chistyakova (KAZ)	2:20.10	822	
5	Nanaka Kajiki (JPN)	2:20.33	819	
6	Ugiloy Norboeva (UZB)	2:23.01	783	
7	Chen Cai-juan (TPE)	2:31.69	672	
8	Emilia Nova (INA)	2:32.81	658	
—	Hoàng Thanh Giang (VIE)	DNF		
—	Fatemeh Mohitizadeh (IRI)	DQ		

=== Summary ===
Rank	Athlete	100mH	HJ	SP	200m	LJ	JT	800m	Total	Notes
1st place, gold medalist(s)	Yuri Tanaka (JPN)	980	830	639	833	789	965	884	5920	
2nd place, silver medalist(s)	Nanaka Kajiki (JPN)	1099	759	600	902	694	800	819	5673	SB
3rd place, bronze medalist(s)	Alina Chistyakova (KAZ)	949	867	613	896	813	608	822	5568	
4	Ugiloy Norboeva (UZB)	928	867	610	769	712	743	783	5412	
5	Chen Cai-juan (TPE)	939	830	709	817	747	664	672	5378	
6	Pooja (IND)	894	867	624	774	688	648	873	5368	
7	Emilia Nova (INA)	1046	724	621	872	697	661	658	5279	SB
8	Anamika Kozhinjaparambil (IND)	868	903	605	801	735	472	850	5234	
—	Hoàng Thanh Giang (VIE)	871	867	489	816	801	516	DNF	DNF	
—	Fatemeh Mohitizadeh (IRI)	1030	941	643	872	DQ	DQ	DQ	DQ	TR7.1
