= Harita Bhadra =

Indian sprinter (born 2003)

Personal information
- Born: 6 June 2003 (age 23) Mumbai, Maharashtra, India

Sport
- Sport: Athletics
- Event: Sprints
Medal record
Women's athletics
Representing India
Asian Games
Bronze medal – third place	2026 Aichi–Nagoya	200 m
Bronze medal – third place	2026 Aichi–Nagoya	4 × 100 m mixed

Harita Bhadra (6 June 2003) is an Indian sprinter. She claimed a bronze medal for India in 200 m at the 2026 Asian Games at Nagoya, Aichi Prefecture, Japan from 19 September to 4 October 2026. She also took part in the 4 × 100 m relay event.

== Early life ==
Bhadra is from Maharashtra. She completed her BSc in sports science, coaching and physical education from Loughborough University in 2025. She trains at Jio Institute in Navi Mumbai. She is also a designer and makes hand made jewellery.

== Career ==
In June 2026, she registered India's fastest time in the last three years in the women's 200 metres clocking 23.14 seconds, as she won the 65th National Inter-State Senior Athletics Championships 2026 at Bhubaneswar and secured the Asian Games qualification. On 10 September 2026, she won the 100 m final at the Indian Athletics Series final meet at New Delhi. She clocked 11.22 sec to set the second fastest Indian time in 100 m. Her previous best of 11.46 s came at World Athletics Silver Level Continental Tour meet in Bhubaneswar in August 2026. In 2026, she also won the 60 m national indoor title clocking 7.32 seconds.
