= Nanaka Kajiki =

Japanese race walker

Personal information
- Nationality: Japanese
- Born: 7 December 2000 (age 25)

Sport
- Sport: Athletics
- Event: Heptathlon
Medal record
Athletics
Representing Japan
Asian Games
Silver medal – second place	2026 Aichi–Nagoya	Women's heptathlon

Nanaka Kajiki (梶木 菜々香, Kajiki Nanaka; born 7 December 2000) is a Japanese heptathlete. Representing Japan at the 2026 Asian Games, she won the silver medal at the women's heptathlon.
