= Ichitaka Yamashita =

Japanese marathon runner (born 1997)

- Yamashita in 2023

Personal information
- Nationality: Japanese
- Born: 29 July 1997 (age 29)

Sport
- Sport: Athletics
- Event: Marathon
Medal record
Men's athletics
Representing Japan
Asian Games
Gold medal – first place	2026 Aichi–Nagoya	Marathon

Ichitaka Yamashita (山下一貴, Yamashita Ichitaka; born 29 July 1997) is a Japanese marathon runner.

== Career ==
Yamashita was selected to represent Japan in the men's marathon at the 2022 Asian Games, however his selection was revoked after the event was postponed due to the COVID-19 pandemic.

In March 2023, he competed at the 2023 Tokyo Marathon and finished in seventh place with a time of 2:05:51, the third fastest time in Japanese history. He was subsequently selected to compete at the 2023 World Athletics Championships where he made his World Athletics Championships debut. During the marathon he passed the 40-kilometer mark in fifth place, however, he lost momentum after suffering cramps in both legs and ultimately finished in 11th place with a time of 2:11:19.

In September 2026, he competed at the 2026 Asian Games and won a gold medal in the marathon with a time of 2:10:49.
