= Gowthami Jayaraman =

Indian athlete (born 1999)

Gowthami Jayaraman (born 1999) is an Indian middle distance runner. She qualified to represent India in women's 800 metre event, along with Pooja Olla, at the 2026 Asian Games at Nagoya, Aichi Prefecture, Japan from 19 September to 4 October 2026.

== Early life ==
Gowthami is from Krishnagiri, Tamil Nadu. She works with Tamil Nadu police. Her husband Sudheer, a sports therapist and former 800m runner, support her in her training. She is coached by Jayachandran at the SDAT High Performance Centre (HPC) in Ooty.

== Career ==
In June 2026, Gowthami won the women’s 800m gold at the 65th National Inter-State Senior Athletics Championships at Bhubaneswar, with a timing of 2 minutes, 04.17 seconds. She bettered the Asian Games 2026 qualification mark of 2:05.21. She clocked 2:08.06 in Chennai in May 2026, and timed 2:08.00 in Thiruvananthapuram on 14 June 2026. In heats at Bhubaneswar, she clocked 2:08.25 before producing her personal best of 2:04.17 in the final. On 10 September 2026, she won the bronze at the Indian Athletics Final Series with a time of 2:05.63.
