= Santhosh Kumar Tamilarasan =

Indian athlete (born 1998)

Personal information
- Born: 1 January 1998 (age 28) Sakkudi, Tamil Nadu, India
- Height: 1.74 m (5 ft 9 in) (2022)

Sport
- Sport: Track and field
- Events: 400 m, 400 m hurdles

Achievements and titles
- Personal bests: 400 m: 46.02 (2024); 400 m hurdles: 49.09 (2023)
Medal record
Men's athletics
Representing India
Asian Championships
Gold medal – first place	2025 Gumi	4x400m mixed
Bronze medal – third place	2023 Bangkok	400 m hurdles
South Asian Games
Silver medal – second place	2019 Kathmandu	400 m hurdles

Santhosh Kumar Tamilarasan (born 1 January 1998) is an Indian track and field athlete who specializes in 400 m and 400 m hurdles events. He was part of the men's 4 × 400 m relay team that represented India at the 2024 Paris Olympics.
