= Athletics at the 2026 Asian Games – Women's 200 metres =

Women's 200 metres at the 2026 Asian Games
- Venue: Mizuho Park Athletic Stadium, Nagoya
- Dates: 26 September 2026 (round 1); 27 September 2026 (final)
- Competitors: 26 from 18 nations
- Winning time: 22.78 s SB

Medalists
gold medal	Shanti Pereira	Singapore
silver medal	Chen Yujie	China
bronze medal	Harita Bhadra	India

The women's 200 metres competition at the 2026 Asian Games took place from 26 to 27 September 2026 at the Mizuho Park Athletic Stadium in Nagoya, Japan.

== Schedule ==
All times are Japan Standard Time (UTC+09:00)

Schedule
Date	Time	Event
26 September 2026	16:25	Round 1
27 September 2026	15:55	Final

== Records ==
Prior to this competition, the existing world, Asian and Games records were as follows.

World Record	Florence Griffith-Joyner (USA)	21.34	Seoul, South Korea	28 September 1988
Asian Record	Li Xuemei (CHN)	22.01	Shanghai, China	21 October 1997
Games Record	Damayanthi Dharsha (SRI)	22.48	Bangkok, Thailand	17 December 1998

== Results ==
=== Round 1 ===
First two in each heat (Q) and next two fastest (q) advanced to the final.

==== Heat 1 ====
Place	Lane	Athlete	Nation	Time	Notes
1		Le Thi Cam Tu	Vietnam	23.38	Q, SB
2		Jirapat Khanontaj	Thailand	23.58	Q, PB
3		Aminat Kamarudeen	United Arab Emirates	23.61	
4		Raihanah Garoubah	Bahrain	23.69	
5		Naomi Johnson	Philippines	23.76	
6		Laylo Allaberganova	Uzbekistan	24.36	
7		Batbold Solongo	Mongolia	24.96	PB
8		Enejan Esedova	Turkmenistan	25.16	
9		Levanita da Costa	Timor-Leste	27.92	

==== Heat 2 ====
Place	Lane	Athlete	Nation	Time	Notes
1		Shanti Pereira	Singapore	23.10	Q
2		Harita Bhadra	India	23.31	Q
3		Edidiong Odiong	Bahrain	23.56	q
4		Zahra Zarei Manoujan	Iran	23.64	PB
5		Aiko Iki	Japan	23.81	
6		Sukanda Petraksa	Thailand	23.94	
7		Sin Tang Yau	Hong Kong	24.32	
8		Azza Al Yaarubi	Oman	25.23	
9		Khoula Omer Khan	Pakistan	26.53	

==== Heat 3 ====
Place	Lane	Athlete	Nation	Time	Notes
1		Chen Yujie	China	23.29	Q
2		Abigeirufuka Ido	Japan	23.30	Q
3		Unnathi Aiyappa	India	23.33	q, PB
4		Zion Rose Nelson	Philippines	23.85	
5		Elizabeth Tan	Singapore	24.11	
6		Aziza Sbaity	Lebanon	24.33	
7		Marwa Saleem	Afghanistan	28.94	
8		Jonbibi Hukmova	Uzbekistan	DNF	

=== Final ===
Place	Lane	Athlete	Nation	Time	Notes
1st place, gold medalist(s)		Shanti Pereira	Singapore	22.78	SB
2nd place, silver medalist(s)		Chen Yujie	China	22.93	
3rd place, bronze medalist(s)		Harita Bhadra	India	23.20	
4		Abigeirufuka Ido	Japan	23.21	
5		Edidiong Odiong	Bahrain	23.41	
6		Unnathi Aiyappa	India	23.46	
7		Le Thi Cam Tu	Vietnam	23.53	
8		Jirapat Khanontaj	Thailand	23.65	
