= Danzeng Quzong =

Chinese racewalker (born 2002)

Personal information
- Nationality: Chinese
- Born: 10 September 2002 (age 24)

Sport
- Sport: Athletics
- Event: Race walking
Medal record
Women's athletics
Representing China
Asian Games
Gold medal – first place	2026 Aichi–Nagoya	Marathon race walk

Danzeng Quzong (Chinese: 旦增曲珍; born 10 September 2002) is a Chinese race walker.

== Career ==
In September 2026, Danzeng competed at the 2026 Asian Games and finished the marathon race walk with a personal best time of 3:26:09. Yasmina Toxanbayeva of Kazakhstan crossed the finish line first, however, following a protest, she was later disqualified due to her shoes not meeting World Athletics requirements. As a result, Danzeng was elevated to the gold medal.
