= Kenki Imaizumi =

Japanese sprinter (born 2001)

Personal information
- Nationality: Japan
- Born: 26 September 2001 (age 25) Fukuoka Prefecture, Japan

Sport
- Sport: Athletics
- Event: 400 metres

Achievements and titles
- Personal bests: 200 m: 21.27 (2024); 300 m: 32.20 (2024)NR; 400 m: 45.29 (2025)
Medal record
Men’s athletics
Representing Japan
Asian Championships
Bronze medal – third place	2023 Bangkok	Mixed 4 × 400 m relay
Asian Games
Gold medal – first place	2026 Aichi–Nagoya	4 × 100 m relay

Kenki Imaizumi (born 26 September 2001) is a Japanese sprinter. He is the Japanese and Asian record holder in the 300 m. He won the bronze medal at the Asian Athletics Championships in the mixed 4 × 400 m relay. He competed at the 2025 World Athletics Championships.

== Biography ==
After enrolling at Fukuoka University Ohori Junior High School, he began athletics when the track and field coach, who saw him playing tag with his friends, invited him to join the club. During junior high school, he competed in the All Japan Junior High School Athletic Championships 4 × 100 m relay for two consecutive years. As a second-year student, he recorded 43.33 seconds and finished third, and as a third-year student, he recorded 43.01 seconds and finished second. After advancing to Fukuoka University Ohori High School, he switched from his original 100m and 200m events to the 400m.

At the 107th Japan Championships in Athletics in June 2023, he placed fourth in the 400 m final with a time of 45.54 seconds. The following month, at the 25th Asian Athletics Championships held in Bangkok, he ran the first leg of the mixed 4 × 400 m relay (Imaizumi Kenki, Haruna Kuboyama, Fuga Sato, Nanako Matsumoto), setting a new Japanese record of 3:15.71 and finishing third. In August of the same year, at the 31st Summer Universiade held in Chengdu, he placed eighth in the 400 m with a time of 47.18 seconds.

Later that August, at the 2023 World Athletics Championships in Budapest, he was selected as a member of the men’s 4 × 400 m relay team, but as a reserve he did not compete; the team was eliminated in the heats with a time of 3:00.39.

After graduating from university, he joined Team SSP, a group of athletes supported by Saga Prefecture, making Saga his training base. At the 108th Japan Championships in Athletics in June 2024, he was eliminated in the heats and missed qualifying for the Paris Olympics. On 11 October 2024, at the 78th National Sports Festival of Japan held in Saga, he recorded 32.20 seconds in the 300 m heats, breaking the previous Japanese and Asian record of 32.21 (set by Kenji Fujimitsu in 2015) to set a new national and Asian record.

In April 2025, he joined Uchida Yoko Co., Ltd. At the 109th Japan Championships in Athletics in July 2025, he recorded 45.29 seconds in the 400 m final. Initially finishing second by 0.01 seconds, he was declared the winner after Fuga Sato, who had crossed the line first, was disqualified for a lane violation. However, on 25 August, about two months after the championships, Sato’s disqualification was overturned, and the result was corrected to place Imaizumi second.

He competed at the 2025 World Athletics Championships in Tokyo, as a member of the mixed 4 × 400 metres relay team, which placed fourth overall, and as a member of the men's 4 × 400 metres relay team.

In May 2026, he ran at the 2026 World Athletics Relays in the men's 4 × 400 metres relay in Gaborone, Botswana.
