= Yuki Joseph Nakajima =

Japanese sprinter

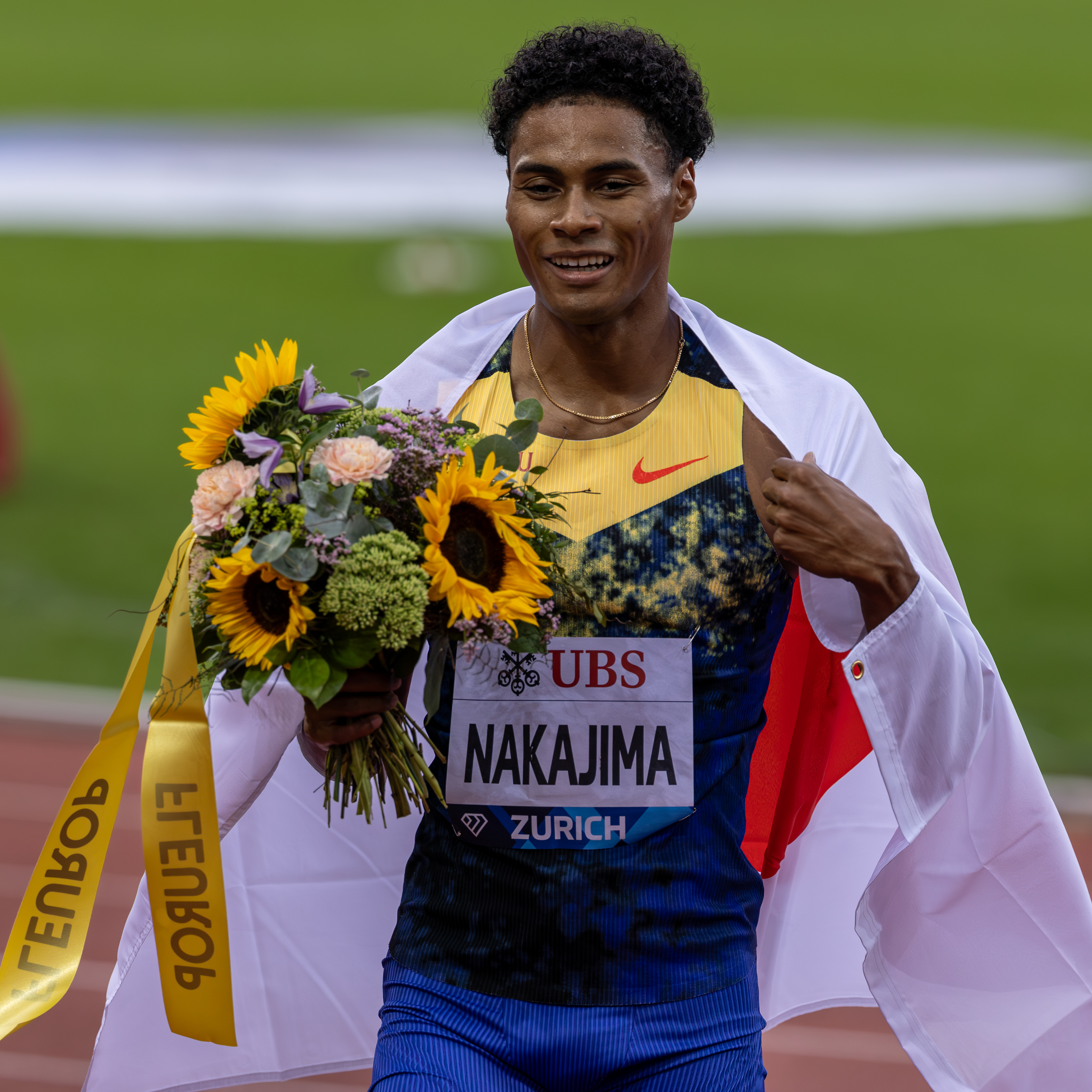
- Nakajima at the 2026 Weltklasse Zürich

Personal information
- Nationality: Japanese
- Born: 30 March 2002 (age 24) Tokyo, Japan

Sport
- Sport: Athletics
- Event: 400 metres

Achievements and titles
- Personal bests: 200 m: 21.31 (Sano 2022); 300 m: 32.86 (Izumo 2023); 400 m: 44.44 (Tokyo 2025) NR
Medal record
Men's athletics
Representing Japan
Asian Games
Gold medal – first place	2026 Aichi–Nagoya	4 × 100 m relay
Bronze medal – third place	2026 Aichi–Nagoya	400 m

Yuki Joseph Nakajima (中島 佑気 ジョセフ, Nakajima Yuki Joseph; born 30 March 2002) is a Japanese sprinter who specializes in the 400 metres.

He competed in the 400 metres at the 2023 World Athletics Championships, where he qualified for the semi-final.

He competed at the 2025 World Athletics Championships, in Tokyo, Japan, running a personal best and Japanese national record 44.44 seconds in his heat before qualifying for the 400 metres final, placing sixth overall. He also ran at the championships in the men's 4 × 400 metres relay.

== Life and career ==
=== Early life and education ===
Yuki Joseph Nakajima was born in Tokyo on 30 March 2002, to a Nigerian father and a Japanese mother. He began athletics in elementary school, and was a high school running prodigy and a junior champion. After attending Tachikawa Municipal Tachikawa Daiichi Junior High School and Josai University Josai High School, he plans to graduate from Toyo University in 2024.

=== Running career ===
Yuki Joseph Nakajima (2026)

During his third year at university, Nakajima was picked for the 400 m in the 2022 World Athletics Championships, where he set an Asian record of 2 minutes 59.51 seconds and finished fourth, his best result to date. In May of the same year, he finished fourth at the 2024 IAAF World Relay Championships (now known as the World Athletics Relays) in the Bahamas. In 2023, Nakajima participated in the World Athletics Championships in Budapest, Hungary, where he missed the final by 0.1 seconds. The same year, he started his training under American athlete Quincy Watts at the University of Southern California in Los Angeles, and signed to Fujitsu's track and field team.

In the 2024 Olympics in Paris, Nakajima competed in two events: the men's 400 metres and 4 × 400 metres relay. In the men's 400 metres, he finished sixth in the third heat with a time of 45.37 seconds, failing to place in the top three and forcing a repechage. In the relay, he set a new Japanese record of 2 minutes 59.48 seconds and advanced to the final. Although he finished sixth in the final, he set an Asian record of 2 minutes 58.33 seconds.

At the 2025 World Athletics Championships in Tokyo, he set a new Japanese record of 44.44 seconds, beating the previous record of 44.77 seconds by a wide margin. He advanced to the finals and started off in eighth place out of eight runners, but eventually overtook two runners to finish in sixth place. This was the highest ever finish for a Japanese athlete in the men's 400 metres, surpassing Takano Susumu's seventh place finish at the 1991 IAAF World Championships.

== Achievements ==
In 2025, Nakajima became the first Japanese man to advance to the finals in the men's 400 metres for the first time in 34 years, beating the record previously held by Susumu Takano.

Representing Japan
Year	Competition	Venue	Position	Result	Notes
2024	Summer Olympics	Paris, France	6th	2:59.48	Mens 400 x 4 Relay
