= Shinya Hayashi =

Japanese sprinter (born 2004)

Personal information
- Nationality: Japanese
- Born: 15 April 2004 (age 22)

Sport
- Sport: Athletics
- Event: 400 metres
Medal record
Men's athletics
Representing Japan
Asian Games
Gold medal – first place	2026 Aichi–Nagoya	4 × 400 m relay
Asian U23 Championships
Gold medal – first place	2026 Ordos City	400 m

Shinya Hayashi (林 申雅, Hayashi Shin'ya; born 15 April 2004) is a Japanese sprinter who specializes in the 400 metres. He is a gold medalist at the Asian Games.

== Athletic career ==
At the 107th Japan Championships in Athletics in June 2023, Hayashi placed seventh in the 400 m final with a time of 46.38 seconds.

In May 2026, Hayashi made his international debut at the World Athletics Relays held in Gaborone, Botswana, where he and the Japanese 4 × 400 m relay team secured a starting place at the 2027 World Athletics Championships. At the 110th Japan Championships in Athletics in June 2026, he placed second in the 400 m final with a time of 44.98 seconds. The following month, at the Asian U23 Championships held in Ordos City, China, he competed in the 400 m and won a gold medal, posting a time of 45.26 seconds. In September, Hayashi competed in two events at the 2026 Asian Games held in Nagoya, Japan, the first in which was the 400 metres, where he qualified in Heat 3 and finished in sixth place in the final with a time of 45.77. He then competed in the in the 4 × 400 metres relay with the Japanese team and won a gold medal with a time of 3:00.75.
