= Kartik Karkera =

Indian marathoner (born 1997)

Kartik Karkera (born 17 March 1997) is an Indian track athlete and marathoner from Mumbai. He qualified to represent India at the men's marathon in the 2026 Asian Games at Nagoya, Aichi Prefecture, Japan from 19 September to 4 October 2026.

== Early life and education ==
Karkera is born in Mumbai. He is a qualified Orthopaedic surgeon and works at Dr. Vasantrao Pawar Hospital in Nashik. He did his schooling at St. Francis D' Assisi in Mumbai. He did his MBBS from 2016 to 2021 at Tambov State Medical University, Tambov, near Russia, and also post-graduation in Orthopaedics and Traumatology. He passed the Foreign Medical Graduate Examination to get the eligibility to practice in India, in January 2024.

== Career ==
Karkera first took part in Nashik marathaon in January 2025 and in September 2025, he participated in the Moscow marathon as a pacer. In only his third marathon, he won the Tata Mumbai marathon in the Indian Elite Men's class and came overall 10th in January 2026. He clocked 2 hours, 19 minutes and 55 seconds and defeated the reigning men's National champion Anish Thapa to second. In April 2026, he won the Delhi Marathon beating Olympian T. Gopi and Asian Marathon winner Man Singh. He clocked 2:13.10, which is faster than the Athletics Federation of India’s (AFI) qualification mark of 2:15:04. Earlier in October 2025, he came third in the Delhi half-marathon.
