= Manu T. S. =

Indian athlete (born 2001)

Personal information
- Born: 17 October 2001 (age 25)

Sport
- Sport: Athletics
- Event: 400 m
Medal record
Men's athletics
Representing India
Asian Games
Silver medal – second place	2026 Aichi–Nagoya	4 × 400 m mixed
Bronze medal – third place	2026 Aichi–Nagoya	4 × 400 m
Asian Championships
Silver medal – second place	2025 Gumi	4 × 400 m

Manu Thekkinalil Saji (born 17 October 2001) is an Indian sprinter who specialises in 400 m events. He has won silver medal in the 4 × 400 m relay at the 2025 Asian Championships and silver medal in the mixed 4 × 400 m relay at the 2026 Asian Games.
