= Jay Kumar =

Indian athlete (born 2006)

Personal information
- Born: 10 June 2006 (age 20)

Sport
- Sport: Athletics
- Event: 400 m
Medal record
Men's athletics
Representing India
Asian Games
| Silver medal – second place | 2026 Aichi–Nagoya | 4 × 400 m mixed |
| Bronze medal – third place | 2026 Aichi–Nagoya | 4 × 400 m |
Asian Championships
| Silver medal – second place | 2025 Gumi | 4 × 400 m |

Jay Kumar (born 10 June 2006) is an Indian athlete, who specialises in 400 metres and relay events. He was part of the team that won a silver medal in the mixed 4 × 400 metres relay event at the 2026 Asian Games in September 2026.

Jay Kumar along with Thekkinalil S Manu, MR Povamma and Kiran Pahal clocked 3:16.23 in Heat 2 to finish fourth behind China and qualified for the final. In the final, the Indian team anchored by Vithya Ramraj won the silver medal. In the final, Jay Kumar and Kiran were replaced by Vishal TK and Vithya Ramraj and who along with Poovamma and Manu, won the silver.
