= Yuri Tanaka =

Japanese athlete

Personal information
- Born: 15 November 2001 (age 25)

Sport
- Sport: Athletics
- Event: Heptathlon
Medal record
Women's athletics
Representing Japan
Asian Games
Gold medal – first place	2026 Aichi–Nagoya	Heptathlon

Yuri Tanaka (born 15 November 2001) is a Japanese multi-event athlete. She won the gold medal in heptathlon at the 2026 Asian Games and is the national record holder in the event, becoming the first Japanese woman to surpass 6000 points.

== Biography ==
From Nagoya, with a score of 5782 points she won the Japanese national title in heptathlon at the 2025 Japanese Combined Events Championships in Gifu.

In February 2026, Tanaka placed sixth in pentathlon at the 2026 Asian Indoor Athletics Championships in Tianjin, China. In April, she set a new personal best of 5807 points in heptathlon. Tanaka then set a new Japanese national record in heptathlon in June 2026 at the Japanese Combined Events Championships in Gifu, reaching a tally of 6050 points, in doing so, she became the first Japanese woman to surpass 6000 points. In September, Tanaka became the first Japanese winner in the women's heptathlon at the Asian Games, after winning the final two disciplines, the javelin and 800 meters, at the 2026 Asian Games in Nagoya, finishing with a tally of 5,920 points ahead of fellow Japanese athlete Nanaka Kajiki and Alina Chistyakova of Kazhakstan.
