= Yusaku Kodama =

Japanese athlete (born 2000)

Personal information
- Nationality: Japanese
- Born: 16 December 2000 (age 25)

Sport
- Sport: Athletics
- Event: Hurdles

Achievements and titles
- Personal best: 400m hurdles: 48.77s (2023)
Medal record
Men's athletics
Representing Japan
Asian Championships
Silver medal – second place	2023 Bangkok	400 m hurdles

Yusaku Kodama (born 16 December 2000) is a Japanese hurdler. He was a silver medalist at the 2023 Asian Athletics Championships in the 400 metres hurdles, and competed at the 2023 World Athletics Championships.

== Career ==
Kodama ran a personal best of 48.77 seconds for the 400 metres hurdles at the Golden Grand Prix in Japan in May 2023. He was a silver medalist at the 2023 Asian Athletics Championships in Bangkok, Thailand, in the 400 metres hurdles. He competed at the 2023 World Athletics Championships in Budapest, Hungary, without advancing to the semi-finals.

Kodama finished fourth in the 400 metres hurdles at the Japanese Athletics Championships in June 2024.

== Personal life ==
He attended Nagano High School in Nagano and Hosei University.
