= Bassem Hemeida =

Qatari hurdler (born 2000)

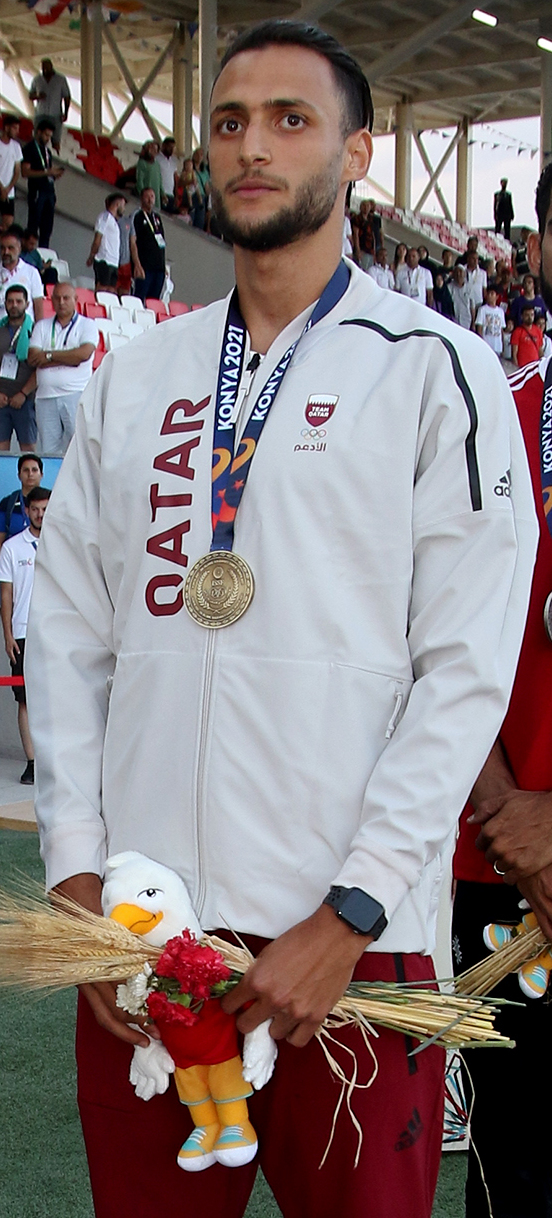
- Bassem Hemeida in 2022

Personal information
- Native name: باسم حميده
- Born: 28 March 2000 (age 26)
- Height: 185 cm (6 ft 1 in)
- Weight: 81 kg (179 lb)
- Website: https://www.instagram.com/bassem_hemeida/?hl=en

Sport
- Sport: 400 m Hurdles

Achievements and titles
- Personal bests: 48.29 (Tokyo, 2025)
Medal record
Men's athletics
Representing the Qatar
Asian Games
Gold medal – first place	2026 Aich-Nagoya	400 m hurdles
Silver medal – second place	2022 Hangzhou	400 m hurdles
Silver medal – second place	2022 Hangzhou	4 × 400 m relay
Asian Championships
Gold medal – first place	2023 Bangkok	400 m hurdles
Gold medal – first place	2025 Gomi	4 × 400 m relay
Silver medal – second place	2025 Gomi	400 m hurdles
Bronze medal – third place	2019 Doha	4 × 400 m relay
Bronze medal – third place	2023 Bangkok	4 × 400 m relay
Islamic Solidarity Games
Gold medal – first place	2021 Konya	400 m hurdles
Arab Games
Gold medal – first place	2023 Bir El Djir	400 m hurdles
Arab Championships
Gold medal – first place	2023 Marrakesh	400 m hurdles
West Asian Championships
Gold medal – first place	2023 Doha	4 × 400 m relay
Silver medal – second place	2023 Doha	400 m hurdles
World U20 Championships
Silver medal – second place	2018 Tampere	400 m hurdles
Asian Junior Championships
Bronze medal – third place	2018 Gifu	400 m hurdles

Bassem Hemeida (born 28 March 2000 in Egypt) is a Qatari hurdler who specializes in the 400 metres hurdles.

He won the silver medal at the 2018 Asian Junior Championships and the 2018 World U20 Championships, and finished fourth at the 2019 Asian Championships. At the 2019 Asian Championships he also won a bronze medal in the 4 × 400 metres relay.

His personal best time is 48.52 seconds, achieved at the 2023 Aisan Games 2022 Asian Games.

His older sister Bassant Hemida (representing Egypt) is a sprinter while his younger brother Seif Heneida (also representing Qatar) is a pole vaulter.
