= Peng Ming-yang =

Taiwanese hurdler

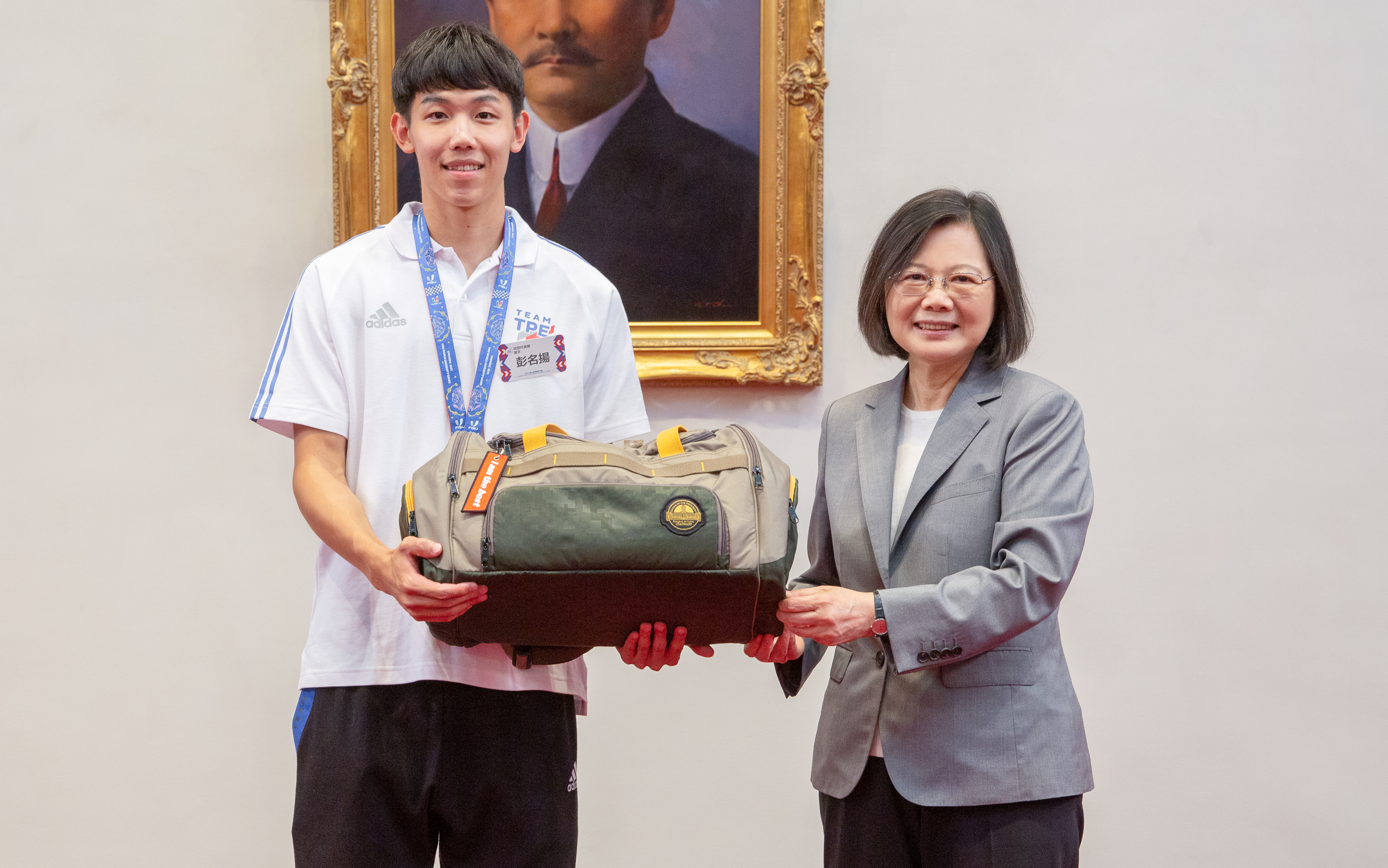

Personal information
- Born: 10 June 1998 (age 28)

Sport
- Country: Taiwan
- Sport: Athletics
- Event: 400 metres hurdles

Achievements and titles
- Personal best: 400 m hurdles: 48.62 (2023)
Medal record
Summer World University Games
Gold medal – first place	2021 Chengdu	400 m hurdles

Peng Ming-yang (Chinese: 彭名揚; born 10 June 1998) is a Taiwanese track and field athlete.

He won a gold medal in the 400 metres hurdles at the 2021 Summer World University Games.
