= Yukiko Umeno =

Japanese race walker

Personal information
- Nationality: Japanese
- Born: 8 January 2003 (age 23)

Sport
- Sport: Athletics
- Event: Race walking
Medal record
Athletics
Asian Athletics Championships
Bronze medal – third place	2023 Bangkok	20 kilometres walk
Asian Games
Bronze medal – third place	2026 Aichi–Nagoya	Marathon walk

Yukiko Umeno (梅野 倖子, Umeno Yukiko; born 8 January 2003) is a Japanese racewalking athlete. Representing Japan at the 2023 Asian Athletics Championships, she won the bronze medal at the women's 20 kilometres walk.

She competed in the women's 20 kilometres walk at the 2023 World Athletics Championships held in Budapest, Hungary.
