= Rin Kubo =

Japanese middle-distance runner

Personal information
- Born: 20 January 2008 (age 18) Wakayama Prefecture, Japan

Sport
- Sport: Athletics
- Event: Middle-distance running

Rin Kubo (久保 凛, Kubo Rin; born 20 January 2008) is a Japanese athlete who specialises in the middle-distance running.

Her personal best in the 800 metres event is 1:59.52 set in Tokyo in 2025. This is the current national record.

== Career ==
Kubo won the 800 metres at the 2024 Japan Championships in Athletics with a time of 2:03.14.

In Kashihara, Nara in July 2024, Kubo ran 1:59.93 in the 800 metres event and set a new national record to break the previous record held by Miho Sato, who ran 2:00.45 in 2005.

In August 2024, at the World U20 Championships, Kubo competed in the 800 metres. She finished 6th in the final with a time of 2:03.31.

Kubo broke her own Japanese record in the 800 metres at the 2025 Japan Championships in Athletics, winning the event with a time of 1:59.52.

== Personal life ==
She is the cousin of Japanese national soccer team player Takefusa Kubo.

== International competitions ==
| Year | Competition | Venue | Position | Event | Notes |
Representing Japan
| 2024 | World U20 Championships | Lima, Peru | 6th | 800 m | 2:03.31 |
| 2025 | Asian Championships | Gumi, South Korea | 2nd | 800 m | 2:00.42 |
| 2025 | World Championships | Tokyo, Japan | 49th (h) | 800 m | 2:02.84 |
