= Victoria Bossong =

American middle-distance runner

Personal information
- Born: May 5, 2003 (age 23)
- Home town: Cumberland, Maine, U.S.

Sport
- Country: Philippines
- Sport: Athletics
- Event: Middle-distance running
- University team: Harvard

Achievements and titles
- Personal bests: 800 m: 1:58.52 (College Station, 2026); Indoor; 400 m: 52.02 (Boston); 800 m: 2:00.36 (Boston, 2026)
Medal record
Women's athletics
Representing Philippines
Asian Games
Bronze medal – third place	2026 Aichi–Nagoya	800 m

Victoria Bossong (born May 5, 2003) is a Filipino-American middle-distance runner. Born in the United States, she competes for the Philippines at international level and won the bronze medal in the 800 metres race at the 2026 Asian Games.

Competing for Harvard University she helped set the US college record for the distance medley relay in 2024. She was runner-up in the 800 metres at the 2025 NCAA Indoor Championships.

== Early life and education ==
Bossong grew up in Cumberland, Maine in the United States.She attended Cheverus High School in Portland, Maine and graduated as valedictorian in 2021. She graduated from Harvard University with a degree in neuroscience in 2025.

== Athletics career ==
=== High school ===
Whilst a high school student at Cheverus, Bossong competed as a sprinter and earned 14 individual state titles in indoor and outdoor track. In her final Class A state meet in 2021, she won the 100 metres and 400 metres and placed second in the 200 metres, and made a late decision to run the 800 meters which she also won. She broke the Maine state record for the 800 metres distance by five seconds in July 2021.

=== College ===
Running for Harvard University, Bossong was part of a distance medley relay, including Maia Ramsden and Sophia Gorriaran, that ran 10:37.55 at the Penn Relays to set a US college record on April 26, 2024.

Representing Harvard, Bossong was the 2025 Ivy League indoor champion over 400 metres with a time of 52.02 seconds. She finished second in the 800 metres at the 2025 NCAA Indoor Championships in Virginia Beach on 15 March. She also placed third overall with the women’s 4 × 400 metres relay at the championships in 3:30.49.

She ran an outdoors 1:59.48 personal best for the 800 metres at the Tom Jones Memorial Invitational in April 2025, to move to eighth on the NCAA outdoor all-time list. She was a finalist over 800 metres at the NCAA Outdoor Championships. In August 2025, she was a semifinalist in the 800 metres at the USA Outdoor Championships in Eugene, Oregon.

=== 2026 ===
After graduating from Harvard, Bossong turned professional with New Balance. On 24 January 2026, Bossong ran an Indoor personal best in the 800 m, running 2:00.36 at the New Balance Indoor Grand Prix, in Boston. On 6 June, Bossong ran a personal best 1:58.52 for the 800 m to place third at the USATF Lone Star Grand Prix in College Station, Texas. At the 2026 Ed Murphey Classic, she set a new Philippine record in the 800m with a time of 2:01.33.

In July 2026, Bossong switched her sporting nationality from the United States to the Philippines. At the 2026 Asian Games, she was part of the team that broke the Philippine record for the mixed 4 × 400 metres relay. She was also the fastest qualifier for the women's 800 metres final, prior to winning the bronze medal.

== Personal life ==
Bossong is from Cumberland, Maine. She is of Filipino descent, by way of her mother, Catalina Yaco Atienza, a dentist who traces roots from Puerto Galera, Oriental Mindoro. She also played soccer in her freshman year and plays piano and violin. She plans to enter medical school once her track career is over.
