= Vishal Thennarasu Kayalvizhi =

Indian sprinter (born 2003)

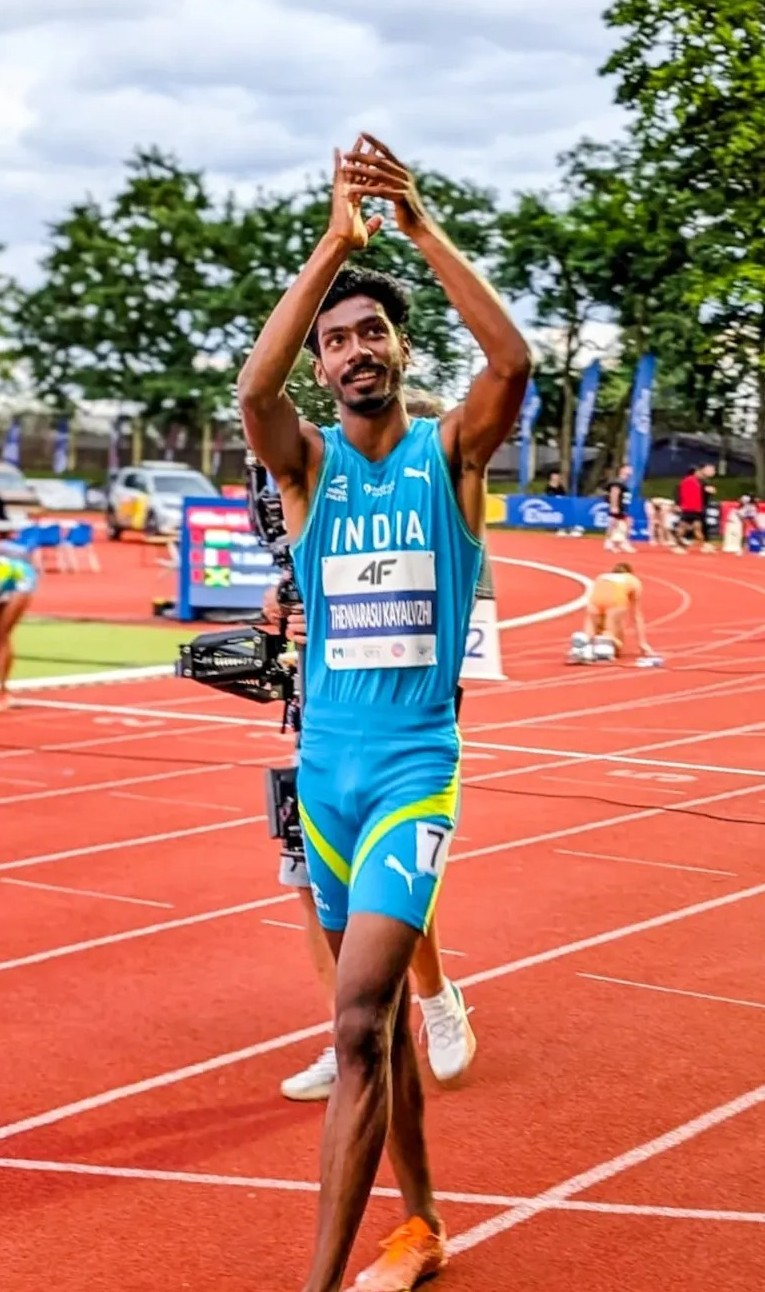
- Vishal in 2025

Personal information
- Born: 17 December 2003 (age 22) Jolarpettai, Tamil Nadu, India
- Height: 1.89 m (6 ft 2 in)

Sport
- Sport: Athletics
- Events: 400 metres, 4 × 400 metres relay
- Coached by: (Jamaica) Jason Dawson

Achievements and titles
- Personal bests: 400 m: 44.98 NR (2026)
Medal record
Men's athletics
Representing India
Asian Games
Silver medal – second place	2026 Aichi–Nagoya	4 × 400 m mixed
Bronze medal – third place	2026 Aichi–Nagoya	4 × 400 m
Asian Championships
Gold medal – first place	2025 Gumi	4 × 400 m mixed
Silver medal – second place	2025 Gumi	4 × 400 m

Vishal Thennarasu Kayalvizhi (born 17 December 2003) is an Indian sprinter who specialises in 400 metres and 4 × 400 metres relay events. He has won a silver and a bronze medal at the 2026 Asian Games and a gold and a silver medal at the 2025 Asian Athletics Championships. He holds the national record in the men's 400 metres with a time of 44.98 seconds and is the first Indian man to run the race in below 45 seconds.

== Early life ==
Vishal was born on 17 December 2003 in Jolarpettai, Tamil Nadu, India. He is the only son and the eldest of the two children of Thennarasu and Kayalvizhi. His father, Thennarasu, was a football player, who had represented Tamil Nadu, and introduced him to sports.

== Career ==
At the age of 10, Vishal moved to Chennai to train at the Jawaharlal Nehru Stadium. He initially focused on 100 and 200 metres sprints. However, he later switched to focus on the 400 metres. He trains at the Inspire Institute of Sport.

At the 2025 World Athletics Relays in Guangzhou, Vishal was part of the men's and mixed 4 × 400 metres relay teams that set season's best times of 3:03.92 and 3:14.81 respectively. At the 2025 Asian Athletics Championships in Gumi, he finished fourth in the men's 400 metres race with a time of 45.57 seconds. He was part of the mixed 4 × 400 metres relay team that won the gold medal with a time of 3:18.12 and the men's 4 × 400 metres relay team that won the silver medal with a time of 3:03.67. At the 2025 Summer World University Games in Bochum, he was a member of the India men's and mixed 4 × 400 metres relay teams that finished fifth and fourth respectively. At the 2025 Indian Open in Bhubaneswar, he won the gold medal in 400 metres with a time of 45.72 seconds and won the silver medal in the 4 × 400 metres relay. At the 2025 National Inter-State Championships in Chennai, he set a new national record in the 400 metres with a time of 45.12 seconds.

At the 2026 World Athletics Relays in Gaborone, Vishal was part of the men's 4 × 400 metres relay team which clocked a season's best time of 3:00.32 in the heats. At the 2026 National Federation Cup in Ranchi, he broke his previous national record in the 400 metres and finished the race in 44.98 seconds, thus becoming the first Indian man to run the race in below 45 seconds. At the 2026 Commonwealth Games, in the 400 metres, he clocked 46.49 seconds in the heats to advance to the semi-finals, where he clocked 46.33 seconds and did not advance to the final. In the mixed 4 × 400 metres relay, the India team finished sixth in the final with a time of 3:20.32. At the 2026 Asian Games at Nagoya, he won a silver medal in the mixed and a bronze medal in the men's 4 × 400 metres relay events.
