= Manato Miyao =

Japanese triple jumper

Personal information
- Native name: 宮尾 真仁
- Nationality: Japanese
- Born: July 16, 2004 (age 22) Hyogo Prefecture, Japan
- Education: Toyo University

Sport
- Sport: Athletics
- Event: Triple jump
- Club: Watanabe Pipe
Medal record
Representing Japan
Men's athletics
Asian Games
| Silver medal – second place | 2026 Aichi–Nagoya | Triple jump |
Asian U20 Athletics Championships
| Gold medal – first place | 2023 Yecheon | Triple jump |

Manato Miyao (Japanese: 宮尾 真仁; born 16 July 2004) is a Japanese triple jumper. He won the silver medal in the men's triple jump at the 2026 Asian Games in Aichi–Nagoya, recording a personal best of 16.77 metres. He previously won the men's triple jump at the 2023 Asian U20 Athletics Championships in Yecheon, South Korea, with a Japanese under-20 record of 16.38 metres.

== Career ==
Miyao was born on 16 July 2004 in Hyogo Prefecture, Japan. He attended Rakunan High School in Kyoto, where he established himself as one of Japan's leading young triple jumpers. In 2022, while at Rakunan, he set a Japanese high-school record of 16.13 metres in the triple jump. The mark was reported in subsequent Japanese athletics competition results as the national high-school record.

Miyao later enrolled at Toyo University, where he continued competing in collegiate athletics. In June 2023, he represented Japan at the Asian U20 Athletics Championships in Yecheon, South Korea. He won the men's triple jump with a distance of 16.38 metres, finishing ahead of China's Ma Yinglong and Sri Lanka's K. V. M. Yasiru. The performance was a personal best at the time and established a Japanese U20 record in the event.

During the 2026 season, Miyao won the men's triple jump at the Japanese Athletics Championships in Nagoya on 12 June. His winning mark of 16.64 metres was a personal best at the time and secured his selection for the 2026 Asian Games. In comments published by the Japan Association of Athletics Federations, he said that improving his personal best and earning selection for the Asian Games had been important goals for the season.

At the 2026 Asian Games, held in Aichi and Nagoya, Japan, Miyao competed in the men's triple jump. On 26 September, he recorded 16.77 metres with a wind reading of +0.9 metres per second, improving his personal best by 13 centimetres and winning the silver medal. South Korea's Kim Jang-woo won the gold medal. Miyao's performance was reported as the best Japanese result in the event at the Asian Games in 24 years.

On 9 October 2026, Watanabe Pipe announced that Miyao would join its athletics team from 1 April 2027, after completing his university career. The company noted his Japanese high-school record, 2023 Asian U20 title and achievements during the 2026 season.
