= 2025 Asian Athletics Championships =

2025 Asian Championships
- Dates: 27–31 May
- Host city: Gumi, South Korea
- Venue: Gumi Civic Stadium
- Events: 45
- Participation: 1193 athletes from 43 nations

The 2025 Asian Athletics Championships was the 26th edition of the Asian Athletics Championships. It was held from 27 to 31 May 2025 in Gumi, South Korea. This was the third time South Korea have hosted the championships after the 1975 and 2005 editions.

== Venue ==
The 26th edition of the Asian Athletics Championships was held at Gumi Civic Stadium, Gumi, South Korea.

== Medal table ==
* Host nation (South Korea)

Rank	teams	Gold	Silver	Bronze	Total
1	China	19	9	4	32
2	India	8	10	6	24
3	Japan	5	11	12	28
4	Kazakhstan	3	1	2	6
4	Qatar	3	1	2	6
6	South Korea*	2	1	1	4
7	Iran	2	1	0	3
8	Kuwait	1	0	0	1
8	Pakistan	1	0	0	1
8	Philippines	1	0	0	1
11	Thailand	0	4	3	7
12	Uzbekistan	0	2	1	3
13	Singapore	0	2	0	2
14	Chinese Taipei	0	1	4	5
15	Saudi Arabia	0	1	2	3
16	Bahrain	0	1	1	2
16	Vietnam	0	1	1	2
18	Sri Lanka	0	0	3	3
19	Hong Kong	0	0	1	1
19	Malaysia	0	0	1	1
Totals (20 entries)		45	46	44	135

== Medalists ==
=== Men ===
Event	Gold		Silver		Bronze	
100 metres	Hiroki Yanagita; Japan	10.20 [.194] SB	Puripol Boonson; Thailand	10.20 [.196]	Abdullah Abkar Mohammed; Saudi Arabia	10.30
200 metres	Towa Uzawa; Japan	20.12 CR	Abdulaziz Abdu Atafi; Saudi Arabia	20:31 PB	Animesh Kujur; India	20:32 NR
400 metres	Ammar Ibrahim; Qatar	45.33	Kentaro Sato; Japan	45.50	Kalinga Kumarage; Sri Lanka	45.55 SB
800 metres	Ebrahim Alzofairi; Kuwait	1:44.59	Ali Amirian; Iran	1:44.97 PB	Abubaker Haydar Abdalla; Qatar	1:45.20
1500 metres	Kazuto Iizawa; Japan	3:42.56 PB	Jae-ung Lee; South Korea	3:42.79	Yoonus Shah; India	3:43.03
5000 metres	Gulveer Singh; India	13:24.77 CR	Kieran Tuntivate; Thailand	13:24.97	Nagiya Mori; Japan	13:25.06
10,000 metres	Gulveer Singh; India	28:38.63	Mebuki Suzuki; Japan	28:43.84	Albert Rop; Bahrain	28:46.82 SB
110 metres hurles	Rachid Muratake; Japan	13.22	Liu Junxi; China	13.31	Qin Weibo; China	13.45 SB
400 metres hurdles	Abderrahman Samba; Qatar	48.00	Bassem Hemeida; Qatar	49.44	Chung-Wei Lin; Chinese Taipei	49.73 SB
3000 metres steeplechase	Avinash Sable; India	8:20.92 SB	Yutaro Niinae; Japan	8:24.41 SB	Zakaria al Alhlami; Qatar	8:27.12 PB
4×100 metres relay	South Korea; Minjun Seo; Joeljin Nwamadi; Lee Jae-seong; Junhyeok Lee	38.49 CR	Thailand; Natawat Iamudom; Thawatchai Himaiad; Chayut Khongprasit; Puripol Boonson	38.78	Hong Kong; Yat Lok Chan; Lee Hong Kit; Chun Ting Kwok; Magnus Johannsson	39.10 PB
4×400 metres relay	Qatar; Abderrahman Samba; Bassem Hemeida; Hatim Aitoulghazi; Ammar Ibrahim	3:03.52	India; Jay Kumar; Dharmveer Choudhary; Vishal Thennarasu Kayalvizhi; Manu Thekkinalil Saji	3:03.67 PB	China; Liang Baotang; Zhang Qing; Ailixier Wumaier; Fu Haoran	3:03.73 SB
20 km racewalk	Wang Zhaozhao; China	1:20:36.90 CR	Kento Yoshikawa; Japan	1:20:44.90	Servin Sebasthiyan; India	1:21:13.60
High jump	Sanghyeok Woo; South Korea	2.29 m	Tomohiro Shinno; Japan	2.26 m SB	Tawan Kaewkam; Thailand	2.23 m SB
Pole vault	Ernest John Obiena; Philippines	5.77 m	Huang Bokai; China	5.72 m SB	Patsapong Amsamarng; Thailand	5.67 m PB
Long jump	Shu Heng; China	8.22 m	Lin Yu-tang; Chinese Taipei	8.20 m	Keito Yamaura; Japan	8.08 m SB
Triple jump	Zhu Yaming; China	17.06 m	Praveen Chithravel; India	16.90 m	Yu Kyu-min; South Korea	16.82 m SB
Shot put	Mohammad Reza Tayyebi; Iran	20.32 m	Xing Jialiang; China	19.97 m	Mohammed Tolo; Saudi Arabia	19.92 m
Discus throw	Abuduaini Tuergong; China	63.47 m SB	Masateru Yugami; Japan	60.38 m	Irfan Shamsuddin; Malaysia	58.82 m
Hammer throw	Wang Qi; China	74.50 m	Tatsuto Nakagawa; Japan	71.97 m PB	Shota Fukuda; Japan	71.89 m
Javelin throw	Arshad Nadeem; Pakistan	86.40 m	Sachin Yadav; India	85.16 m PB	Yuta Sakiyama; Japan	83.75 m PB
Decathlon	Fei Xiang; China	7634 pts	Tejaswin Shankar; India	7618 pts	Keisuke Okuda; Japan	7602 pts

* Indicates the athletes only competed in the preliminary heats and received medals

=== Women ===
Event	Gold		Silver		Bronze	
100 metres	Liang Xiaojing; China	11.37	Shanti Pereira; Singapore	11.41	Trần Thị Nhi Yến; Vietnam	11.54
200 metres	Chen Yujie; China	22.97 PB	Shanti Pereira; Singapore	22.98 SB	Li Yuting; China	23.23 SB
400 metres	Nanako Matsumoto; Japan	52.17 PB	Rupal Chaudhary; India	52.68	Jonbibi Hukmova; Uzbekistan	52.79 PB
800 metres	Wu Hongjiao; China	2:00.08 CR	Rin Kubo; Japan	2:00.42	Pooja Olla; India	2:01.89 PB
1500 metres	Li Chunhui; China	4:10.58	Pooja Olla; India	4:10.83	Tomoka Kimura; Japan	4:11.56 SB
5000 metres	Norah Jeruto; Kazakhstan	14:58.71 CR	Parul Chaudhary; India	15:15.33	Yuma Yamamoto; Japan	15:16.86
10,000 metres	Daisy Jepkemei; Kazakhstan	30:48.44	Ririka Hironaka; Japan	30:56.32	Mikuni Yada; Japan	31:12.21
100 metres hurdles	Jyoti Yarraji; India	12.96	Yumi Tanaka; Japan	13.07 [.061]	Wu Yanni; China	13.07 [.068]
400 metres hurdles	Mo Jiadie; China	55.31	Kemi Adekoya; Bahrain	55.32	Vithya Ramraj; India	56:46
3000 metres steeplechase	Norah Jeruto; Kazakhstan	9:10.46 CR	Parul Chaudhary; India	9:12.46 NR	Daisy Jepkemei; Kazakhstan	9:27.51
4×100 metres relay	China; Chen Yujie; Li Yuting; Zhu Junying; Liang Xiaojing	43.28 SB	India; Abinaya Rajarajan; Sneha Sathyanarayana Shanuvalli; Nithya Gandhe; Srabani Nanda	43.86 SB	Thailand; Jirapat Khanonta; Supanich Poolkerd; Sukanda Petraksa; Athicha Phetkun	44.26 PB
4×400 metres relay	India; Jisna Mathew; Rupal Chaudhary; Rajitha Kunja; Subha Venkatesan	3:34.18 SB	Vietnam; Thi Ngoc Nguyen; Nguyen Thi Hang; Quách Thị Lan; Hoang Thi Minh Hanh	3:34.77	Sri Lanka; Nadeesha Ramanayake; Lakshima Mendis; Jayeshi Uththara; Harshani Fernando	3:36.67
20 km racewalk	Yin Hang; China	1:30:44	Ma Li; China	1:32:08	Yasmina Toxanbayeva; Kazakhstan	1:32:22
High jump	Pooja Singh; India	1.89 m PB	Safina Sadullaeva; Uzbekistan Yelizaveta Matveyeva; Kazakhstan	1.86 m	Not awarded	
Pole vault	Niu Chunge; China	4.48	Xu Huiqin; China	4.23	Misaki Morota; Japan	4.13
Long jump	Reihaneh Mobini; Iran	6.40 m	Ancy Sojan; India	6.33 m	Shaili Singh; India	6.30 m
Triple jump	Li Yi; China	13.80 m	Sharifa Davronova; Uzbekistan	13.74 m	Mariko Morimoto; Japan	13.65 m SB
Shot put	Ma Yue; China	18.26 m	Song Jiayuan; China	17.78 m	Ching Yuan Chiang; Chinese Taipei	17.42 m PB
Discus throw	Feng Bin; China	61.90 m	Subenrat Insaeng; Thailand	57.68 m	Nanaka Kori; Japan	56.48 m
Hammer throw	Ji Li; China	72.98 m	Li Jiangyan; China	69.13 m	Yu Ya-chien; Chinese Taipei	64.25 m
Javelin throw	Su Lingdan; China	63.29 m PB	Momone Ueda; Japan	59.39 m SB	Sae Takemoto; Japan	58.94 m
Heptathlon	Nandini Agasara; India	5941 pts PB	Liu Jingyi; China	5869 pts PB	Chen Tsai-chuan; Chinese Taipei	5608 pts

* Indicates the athletes only competed in the preliminary heats and received medals

=== Mixed ===
Event	Gold		Silver		Bronze	
4×400 metres relay	India; Santhosh Kumar Tamilarasan; Rupal Chaudhary; Vishal Thennarasu Kayalvizhi; Subha Venkatesan	3:18.12	China; Liang Baotang; Wu Hongjiao; Ailixier Wumaier; Liu Yinglan	3:20.52 SB	Sri Lanka; S.M.S.V Rajakaruna; Lakshima Mendis; Kalinga Kumarage; Harshani Fernando	3:21.95

== Participating nations ==
A total of 39 countries participated.

- Bahrain (7)
- Bangladesh (5)
- Bhutan (4)
- Cambodia (1)
- China (66)
- Chinese Taipei (31)
- Hong Kong (41)
- India (62)
- Indonesia (21)
- Iran (26)
- Iraq (15)
- Japan (71)
- Jordan (5)
- Kazakhstan (32)
- Kuwait (22)
- Kyrgyzstan (8)
- Laos (2)
- Lebanon (3)
- Macau (11)
- Malaysia (36)
- Maldives (2)
- Mongolia (5)
- Myanmar (5)
- Nepal (6)
- Oman (5)
- Pakistan (5)
- Palestine (4)
- Philippines (17)
- Qatar (19)
- Saudi Arabia (30)
- Singapore (23)
- South Korea (91)
- Sri Lanka (21)
- Tajikistan (5)
- Thailand (34)
- Turkmenistan (5)
- United Arab Emirates (4)
- Uzbekistan (36)
- Vietnam (17)

== Iran national track and field team sex and Theft scandal ==
During the 2025 Asian Athletics Championships in Gumi, South Korea, from May 27 to 31, two Iranian athletes and one coach were arrested for allegedly sexually assaulting a 20-year-old South Korean woman on May 31 at a hotel where the Iranian delegation was staying. The woman reportedly met one of the athletes, identified as "K," at a bar in Gumi, near the athletes’ village, before being taken to the hotel where the assault occurred. South Korean police classified the incident as "Special Rape," a serious offense under local law, and detained the suspects following the woman's complaint, with one individual present at the scene later released. The case triggered widespread public outrage in South Korea, with media outlets like Hankyoreh and Korea Times providing extensive coverage. Social media platforms saw an outpouring of anger from South Koreans, with many expressing shock, grief, and demands for harsh penalties, labeling the incident a violation of trust during an international event. Feminist groups and activists also voiced concerns, calling for stronger protections for women. The ongoing investigation continues to draw intense scrutiny and has sparked broader discussions on safety and accountability at global sporting events.

One of the three runners attempted suicide unsuccessfully while in custody. Another Iranian athlete was arrested for "stealing" and was released after paying a "fine" from Iran.

Iranian Minister of youth affairs and sports was called to appear before Iranian parliament for questioning.

== Broadcasting ==
Territory	Broadcaster(s)	Reference
No restricted territory	STN SPORTS^{(YouTube channel)}	Live & Event finals playlist on YouTube
