= 2024 West Asian Athletics Championships =

5th West Asian Athletics Championships
- Dates: 29 May – 1 June
- Host city: Basra, Iraq
- Venue: Basra International Stadium
- Events: 42

The 2024 West Asian Athletics Championships was the fourth edition of the international athletics competition organised by the West Asian Athletics Association that took place from 29 May and 1 June 2024 at Basra International Stadium in Basra, Iraq.

== Medal summary ==
=== Men ===
Event	Gold		Silver		Bronze	
100 metres (wind: -0.4 m/s)	Malham Darwish (OMA)	10.25	Nasser Mahmoud Mohamed (KSA)	10.27	Tosin Ogunode (QAT)	10.32
200 metres (wind: 0.0 m/s)	Abdelaziz Abdou Atafi (KSA)	20.62	Benyamin Yousefi (IRI)	20.89	Mohamed Obaid Al-Saadi (OMA)	21.01
400 metres	Ammar Ismail Yahya Ibrahim (QAT)	45.40	Mazen Mawtan Al-Yasen (KSA)	45.49	Taha Hussein Yaseen (IRQ)	45.88
800 metres	Ebrahim Al-Zofairi (KUW)	1:47.56	Ali Amirian (IRI)	1:47.74	Hatim Ait Oulghazi (QAT)	1:47.87
1500 metres	Zakariya Al-Khlami (QAT)	3:41.67	Fayaz Abdullah Al-Subaie (KSA)	3:43.02	Ali Amirian (IRI)	3:47.08
5000 metres	Amir Zamanpour (IRI)	14:46.79	Tariq Ahmed Al-Amri (KSA)	14:51.10	Hussein Mohamed (IRQ)	14:59.48
10,000 metres	Tariq Ahmed Al-Amri (KSA)	32:04.24	Hussein Mohamed (IRQ)	33:26.40	Hassan Saad Kadhim (IRQ)	34:44.41
110 metres hurdles (wind: +0.2 m/s)	Masoud Kamran (IRI)	13.81	Saleh Saleh (IRQ)	13.85	Mohammed Hadi (IRQ)	14.31
400 metres hurdles	Ahmed Gamal Gomaa (IRQ)	51.12	Azzam Ibrahim Abu Bakr (KSA)	52.39	Abbas Oudah Al-Khawaf (IRQ)	52.99
3000 metres steeplechase	Zakariya Al-Khlami (QAT)	8:45.6	Hossein Keyhani (IRI)	8:45.8	Raed Al-Jadani (KSA)	8:59.1
4 × 100 metres relay	Oman ? Mohamed Obaid Al-Saadi; Malham Darwish; Ali Anwar Al-Balushi	39.78	Iraq ? ? Hussein Ali Al-Khafaji; Falah Abdulzahra Mahdi	40.32	Only two starting teams	
4 × 400 metres relay	Qatar ? ? ? Ashraf Hussein Osman	3:07.29	Iraq ? ? ? Taha Hussein Yaseen	3:07.54	Only two starting teams	
10 kilometres walk	Hamid Reza Zouravand (IRI)	46:55	Ramzi Ahmed Saleh (QAT)	49:35	Mustafa Razzak (IRQ)	54:01
High jump	Hamdi Ali (QAT)	2.13 m	Abderrahmen Omar Sabar (IRQ)	2.10 m	Hassan Hussein (IRQ)	2.10 m
Pole vault	Amir Subeih Seihoud (IRQ)	5.21 m CR	Amir Faleh Abdulwahid (IRQ)	5.00 m	Only two starters	
Long jump	Abdullah Gamr (IRQ)	7.12 m	Ehab Yassin (IRQ)	7.03 m	Mohamed Salem Al-Rawahi (OMA)	6.91 m
Triple jump	Sami Bakheet (KSA)	15.48 m	Zinel Abidin Subeih (IRQ)	15.43 m	Mohamed Salem Al-Rawahi (OMA)	15.40 m
Shot put	Mohamed Reza Tayebi (IRI)	18.98 m CR	Ibrahim Al-Fadhli (KUW)	17.26 m	Ahmed Hameed Khudair (IRQ)	16.77 m
Discus throw	Essa Mohamed Al-Zenkawi (KUW)	61.32 m	Mohamed Ibrahim Moaaz (QAT)	58.34 m	Mustafa Kazim Al-Saamah (IRQ)	55.10 m
Hammer throw	Ashraf Amgad El-Seify (QAT)	72.80 m	Mohammed Al-Dubaisi (KSA)	69.70 m	Ahmed Amgad El Seify (QAT)	68.62 m
Javelin throw	Ali Essa Abdelghani (KSA)	75.10 m	Sadeqh Khademi (IRI)	73.24 m	Abdulrahman Al-Azmi (KUW)	71.62 m
Decathlon	Abdelsajjad Saadoun Nasir (IRQ)	6811 pts	Mohsen Hassan Al-Dabbous (KSA)	6782 pts	Abdullah Al-Ameeri (KUW)	5655 pts

=== Women ===
Event	Gold		Silver		Bronze	
100 metres (wind: NWI)	Dana Abdul Razak Hussein (IRQ)	11.80	Sultan Al-Yarubi (OMA)	12.01	Hibah Mohammed (KSA)	12.24
200 metres (wind: -1.1 m/s)	Dana Abdul Razak Hussein (IRQ)	24.23	Sultan Al-Yarubi (OMA)	24.77	Hibah Mohammed (KSA)	25.92
400 metres	Nazanin Fatemeh Eidiyan (IRI)	55.28	Kazhan Rostami (IRI)	56.54	Shahid Ashraf (QAT)	56.95
800 metres	Toktam Dastarbandan (IRI)	2:08.20	Negin Azari Edalat (IRI)	2:10.35	Amal Al-Roumi (KUW)	2:11.63
1500 metres	Parichehr Shahi (IRI)	4:38.36	Amal Al-Roumi (KUW)	4:38.73	Nargis Hussein (IRQ)	4:48.08
5000 metres	Arab Parisa (IRI)	18:26.12	Diana Karim Lamia (IRQ)	19:11.09	Amal Mohammed (IRQ)	21:26.57
10,000 metres	Arab Parisa (IRI)	36:47.00	Amal Mohammed (IRQ)	44:02.00	Hanin Tahir Al-Rimawy (PLE)	47:09.00
100 metres hurdles (wind: 0.0 m/s)	Kurdistan Jamal (IRQ)	14.73	Alyasar Yousif (SYR)}	14.87	Mazoon Al-Alawi (OMA)	15.61
400 metres hurdles	Nazanin Fatemeh Eidiyan (IRI)	60.99	Shahla Mahmoudi (IRI)	61.51	Avin Said Mustafa (IRQ)	65.18
3000 metres steeplechase	Hadiseh Raouf (IRI)	11:20.26 CR	Loaa Zaarour (LIB)	12:28.72	Only two starters	
4 × 100 metres relay	Oman	48.27	Iraq	48.63	Iran	49.36
4 × 400 metres relay	Iran	3:46.72	Iraq	3:53.77	Lebanon	4:41.31
5 kilometres walk	Fatemeh Zahra Ghalehnoy (IRI)	27:3	Zeinab Ahadi (IRI)	30:00	Ramia Shaban (SYR)	30:27
High jump	Maryam Abdulhameed (IRQ)	1.77 m CR	Asal Ali Gholi (IRI)	1.70 m	Mahya Naeimi (IRI)	1.70 m
Pole vault	Mahsa Mirzatabibi (IRI)	3.80 m CR	Samira Kordali (IRI)	3.40 m	Only two starters	
Long jump	Reyhaneh Arani (IRI)	6.22 m CR	Elaneh Rahimifar (IRI)	5.89 m	Aisha Al-Khedher (KUW)	5.66 m
Triple jump	Maryam Kazemi (IRI)	12.82 m CR	Sarina Saedi (IRI)	12.35 m	Newruz Ahmed Qadir (IRQ)	11.69 m
Shot put	Elham Sadathashemi (IRI)	13.77 m	Zahra Omidvar (IRI)	13.14 m	Baneen Ahmed Abdelwahab (IRQ)	10.74 m
Discus throw	Mahla Mahrooghi (IRI)	49.42 m CR	Jaleh Kardan (IRI)	46.44 m	Afak Faeek (IRQ)	40.72 m
Hammer throw	Melika Norouzi (IRI)	56.52 m CR	Zahra Rostami (IRI)	54.36 m	Marwa Al-Khailani (IRQ)	44.44 m
Javelin throw	Mana Hosseini (IRI)	50.57 m CR	Hiba Al-Asmi (OMA)	40.67 m	Asia Azir (IRQ)	38.42 m
Heptathlon	Fatemeh Mohitizadeh (IRI)	5249 pts	Saba Khorasani (IRI)	5034 pts	Salsabeel Al-Sayyar (KUW)	3950 pts

=== Mixed ===
Event	Gold		Silver		Bronze	
4 × 400 metres relay	Iraq; Mohamed Abdul Ridha; Sara Fadhil; Taha Hussein Yaseen; Baraa Mahmoud	3:27.12 CR, NR	Kuwait	3:30.30 NR	Lebanon	3:44.36

== Medal table ==
* Host nation (Iraq)

Rank	Nation	Gold	Silver	Bronze	Total
1	Iran (IRI)	21	16	3	40
2	Iraq (IRQ)*	9	12	17	38
3	Qatar (QAT)	6	3	4	13
4	Saudi Arabia (KSA)	4	7	3	14
5	Oman (OMA)	3	3	4	10
6	Kuwait (KUW)	2	2	5	9
7	Lebanon (LIB)	0	1	2	3
8	Syria	0	1	1	2
9	Palestine (PLE)	0	0	1	1
Totals (9 entries)		45	45	40	130
