= 2023 West Asian Athletics Championships =

4th West Asian Athletics Championships
- Dates: 26–29 April
- Host city: Doha, Qatar
- Venue: Suheim bin Hamad Stadium
- Events: 42
- Participation: 12 nations

The 2023 West Asian Athletics Championships was the fourth edition of the international athletics competition organised by the West Asian Athletics Association that took place from 26 to 29 April 2023 at Suheim bin Hamad Stadium in Doha, Qatar.

== Medal summary ==
=== Men ===
Event	Gold		Silver		Bronze	
100 metres (wind: +1.8 m/s)	Femi Ogunode (QAT)	10.13	Abdullah Abkar Mohammed (KSA)	10.23	Tosin Ogunode (QAT)	10.31
200 metres (wind: -0.6 m/s)	Femi Ogunode (QAT)	20.70	Abdelaziz Abdou Atafi (KSA)	20.98	Noureddine Hadid (LIB)	21.18
400 metres	Ammar Ismail Yahya Ibrahim (QAT)	46.23	Ashraf Hussein Osman (QAT)	47.33	Yasser Ali Al-Saadi (IRQ)	47.35
800 metres	Abdullah Al-Yaari (YEM)	1:49.64	Hussein Mohsin Al-Farsi (OMA)	1:50.14	Mubarak Rabi Mahmoud (QAT)	1:50.62
1500 metres	Abdirahman Saeed Hassan (QAT)	3:42.79	Mousaab Adam Ali (QAT)	3:43.65	Fayaz Abdullah Al-Subaie (KSA)	3:44.63
5000 metres	Dawit Fikadu (BHR)	13:51.46	Yaser Salem Bagharab (QAT)	14:16.47	Abdikani Hamid (BHR)	14:16.83
10,000 metres	Dawit Fikadu (BHR)	29:08.75	Tariq Ahmed Al-Amri (KSA)	29:34.74	Abdikani Hamid (BHR)	30:10.53
110 metres hurdles (wind: +1.5 m/s)	Yaqoub Mohamed Al-Youha (KUW)	13.67 CR	Salah Kadhim Naser (IRQ)	14.25	Omar Doudai Abakar (QAT)	14.27
400 metres hurdles	Ismail Doudai Abakar (QAT)	49.94	Bassem Hemeida (QAT)	50.51	Marc Anthony Ibrahim (LIB)	51.19
3000 metres steeplechase	Yaser Salem Bagharab (QAT)	8:33.63	Adam Ali Musab (QAT)	8:34.25	Mohamed Abdullah Mahal (IRQ)	8:35.85 NR
4 × 100 metres relay	Oman; Barakat Al-Harthi; Ali Anwar Ali Al-Baloushi; Rashid Al-Asimi; Mohamed Obaid Al-Saadi	39.43	Saudi Arabia; Mahmoud Hafiz Ibrahim; Sultan Khalid Al-Khalidi; Abdullah Abkar Mohammed; Abdelaziz Abdou Atafi	39.86	Qatar; Tosin Ogunode; Mahamat Zakaria Khalid; A.M. Al-Mohamed; Femi Ogunode	40.17
4 × 400 metres relay	Qatar; Ashraf Hussein Osman; Ammar Ismail Yahya Ibrahim; Ismail Doudai Abakar; Bassem Hemeida	3:05.19 CR	Iraq; Yasir Ali Al Saadi; Noureddine Adel Merzeh; Mohamed Abdul Ridha Chunchun; Taha Hussein Yaseen	3:07.53	Lebanon; Noureddine Hadid; Marc Anthony Ibrahim; Tamer Saleh; Mohamad Mortada	3:13.50 NR
10,000 metres walk	Al Shaali Hassan Jasim Al-Nuaimi (UAE)	48:30.49	Mabrook Saleh Nasser (QAT)	49:09.64	Abboud Gouda (JOR)	50:54.86
High jump	Mutaz Essa Barshim (QAT)	2.20 m	Fathi Abdul Ghafoor (OMA)	2.05 m	Hussein Falah Al-Ibrahimi (IRQ)	2.05 m
Pole vault	Seifeldin Abdelsalam (QAT)	5.20 m CR	Amir Faleh Abdulwahid (IRQ)	4.90 m	Amir Subeih Seihoud (IRQ)	4.80 m
Long jump	Salem Saleh Al-Jerbi (OMA)	7.54 m	Salem Al-Bloushi (UAE)	6.92 m	Sultan Salah Al-Rayes (KUW)	6.83 m
Triple jump	Salem Saleh Al-Jerbi (OMA)	15.55 m	Talal Salem (KUW)	14.27 m	Salem Al-Bloushi (UAE)	13.56 m
Shot put	Abdelrahman Mahmoud (BHR)	20.65 m CR	Baqir Al-Hamidawi Mohamed (IRQ)	17.55 m	Jibreen Adam Ahmed (QAT)	17.55 m
Discus throw	Mohamed Ibrahim Moaaz (QAT)	61.30 m	Essa Mohamed Al-Zenkawi (KUW)	59.66 m	Musaeb Al-Momani (JOR)	52.44 m
Hammer throw	Ashraf Amgad El-Seify (QAT)	67.87 m	Ali Al-Zenkawi (KUW)	66.61 m	Khalil Bedoui (QAT)	62.28 m
Javelin throw	Karar Raid Mehdi (IRQ)	67.26 m	Abdulrahman Al-Azemi (KUW)	66.23 m	Nabil Al-Akoumi (LIB)	59.23 m
Decathlon	Abdelsajjad Saadoun Nasir (IRQ)	6810 pts	Abdullah Al-Ameeri (KUW)	5810 pts	Ahmed Basou (SYR)	5267 pts

=== Women ===
Event	Gold		Silver		Bronze	
100 metres (wind: NWI)	Mudahawi Al-Shammari (KUW)	11.3	Aziza Sbaity (LBN)	11.6	Mazoon Al-Alawi (OMA)	11.8
200 metres (wind: +0.9 m/s)	Aziza Sbaity (LBN)	24.12	Mudahawi Al-Shammari (KUW)	24.55	Ruqaya Jameel Saad Al-Saeed (IRQ)	26.03
400 metres	Saja Issa Saadoun (QAT)	59.65	Maria Nohra (LIB)	59.79	Lynn Ghazaoui (LIB)	60.57
800 metres	Marta Hirpato (BHR)	2:07.09	Tigist Mekonen (BHR)	2:08.40	Amal Al-Roumi (KUW)	2:14.39
1500 metres	Marta Hirpato (BHR)	4:24.82	Tigist Mekonen (BHR)	4:26.45	Joan Makary (LIB)	4:41.00
5000 metres	Bontu Rebitu (BHR)	16:01.80 CR	Loaa Zaarour (LIB)	19:46.31	Mozah Al-Ghafli (UAE)	20:26.40
10,000 metres	Bontu Rebitu (BHR)	34:43.84	Diana Karim (IRQ)	44:46.27	Only two participants	
100 metres hurdles (wind: +1.8 m/s)	Mazoon Al-Alawi (OMA)	14.35	Kurdistan Jamal (IRQ)	14.38 NR	Delsoz Obaid Najim (IRQ)	14.63
400 metres hurdles	Kurdistan Jamal (IRQ)	64.87	Saja Issa Saadoun (QAT)	67.09	Muhra Taklia (UAE)	67.51
4 × 100 metres relay	Lebanon; Haya Kobrosly; Mayssa Mouawad; Christel El Saneh; Aziza Sbaity	47.32 NR	Iraq; Derin Bakhtiar; Delsoz Obaid Najim; Kurdistan Jamal; Ruqaya Jameel Saad Al-Saeed	49.23	Kuwait; Mudahawi Al-Shammari; Aisha Waleed Al-Khedr; Sheikha Al-Qattan; Salsabeel Al-Sayyar	49.92
4 × 400 metres relay	Lebanon; Maria Nohra; Joan Makary; Leen Ghazaoui; Lea Deeb	4:15.01	Qatar; Samar Reda Mansouri; Bashair Obaid Al-Manwari; L. T. Ibrahim; Saja Issa Saadoun	4:24.17	Kuwait; Amal Al-Roumi; F. Al-Hasaoui; B. Al-Mayas; S. Al-Rumyan	4:27.38
High jump	Maryam Abdulhameed (IRQ)	1.73 m	Maysaa Mouawad (LIB)	1.70 m	Dalal Marzouk (KUW)	1.55 m
Long jump	Fatima Moubarak (BHR)	5.89 m CR, NR	Christel El Saneh (LIB)	5.47 m	Maryam Abdulhameed (IRQ)	5.43 m
Triple jump	Bashair Obaid Al-Manwari (QAT)	11.62 m	Christel El Saneh (LIB)	11.44 m	Nowruz Ahmed Qader (IRQ)	11.23 m
Shot put	Noora Salem Jassem (BHR)	15.05 m	Fatima Al-Hosani (UAE)	11.91 m	Sheikha Al-Qattan (KUW)	11.39 m
Discus throw	Adhraa Nabil Jalil (IRQ)	40.50 m NR	Aisha Waleed Al-Khuder (KUW)	39.32 m	Fatima Al-Hosani (UAE)	39.29 m
Hammer throw	Marwa Qais Marhoun (IRQ)	47.95 m NR	Dhaha Hamed Al-Shinawi (OMA)	46.01 m	Mariam Youssef (LIB)	40.93 m
Javelin throw	Azir Asia (IRQ)	40.88 m NR	Salsabeel Al-Sayyar (KUW)	35.45 m	Ranna Bakkar (JOR)	32.31 m
Heptathlon	Baneen Ahmad Abdelwahab (IRQ)	3641 pts	Salsabeel Al-Sayyar (KUW)	3308 pts	Sanar Ridha (QAT)	1752 pts

=== Mixed ===
Event	Gold		Silver		Bronze	
4 × 400 metres relay	Kuwait; Jasem Walied Al-Mas; M. F. Jaber; Amal Al-Roumi; Mudhawi Al-Shammari	3:32.44 NR	Lebanon; Mohamad Mortada; Marc Anthony Ibrahim; Aziza Sbaity; Maria Nohra	3:32.60 NR	Iraq; Mohamed Abdul Ridha Chunchun; Kurdistan Jamal; M. B. Iyad; Ruqaya Jameel Saad Al-Saeed	3:37.40 NR

== Medal table ==
Rank	Nation	Gold	Silver	Bronze	Total
1	Qatar (QAT)	13	9	7	29
2	Bahrain (BHR)	9	2	2	13
3	Iraq (IRQ)	8	7	9	24
4	Oman (OMA)	4	3	1	8
5	Kuwait (KUW)	3	9	6	18
6	Lebanon (LIB)	3	7	7	17
7	United Arab Emirates (UAE)	1	2	4	7
8	Yemen (YEM)	1	0	0	1
9	Saudi Arabia (KSA)	0	3	1	4
10	Jordan (JOR)	0	0	3	3
11	Syria	0	0	1	1
Totals (11 entries)		42	42	41	125
