= List of Saudi Arabian records in athletics =

The following are the national records in athletics in Saudi Arabia maintained by the Saudi Arabian Athletics Federation (SAAF).

== Outdoor ==
Key to tables: Awaiting ratification Record not kept by SAAF Not ratified or later rescinded by SAAF

dh = downhill course

=== Men ===
Event	Record	Athlete	Date	Meet	Place	Ref.
100 m	10.03 (+1.2 m/s)	Abdullah Abkar Mohammed	30 June 2018	Meeting de Paris	Paris, France	
100 m	9.95 (+1.7 m/s) IRM	Abdullah Abkar Mohammed	9 August 2022	Islamic Solidarity Games	Konya, Turkey	
200 m	20.14 (+1.8 m/s)	Abdulaziz Abdui Atafi	17 May 2025	Saudi Arabian Championships	Taif, Saudi Arabia	
300 m	32.76	Hamdan Odha Al-Bishi	27 August 2002		Gothenburg, Sweden	
400 m	43.93	Yousef Ahmed Masrahi	23 August 2015	World Championships	Beijing, China	
800 m	1:43.66	Mohammed Al-Salhi	8 May 2009	Qatar Athletic Super Grand Prix	Doha, Qatar	
1500 m	3:31.82	Mohammed Shaween	29 May 2011	Fanny Blankers-Koen Games	Hengelo, Netherlands	
Mile	3:52.00	Mohammed Shaween	9 June 2011	Bislett Games	Oslo, Norway	
2000 m	5:03.52	Saad Al-Asmari	26 June 1995		Prague, Czech Republic	
3000 m	7:44.57	Alyan Sultan Al-Qahtani	16 August 1996		Cologne, Germany	
5000 m	12:58.58	Mukhlid Al-Otaibi	23 July 2005	KBC Night of Athletics	Heusden-Zolder, Belgium	
5 km (road)	13:58+ (Note: Brutto official time ["Gun Time"], net chip time is 13:55)	Tariq Ahmed Al Amri	15 January 2023	10K Valencia Ibercaja	Valencia, Spain	
10,000 m	27:31.61	Mukhlid Al-Otaibi	9 June 2012		Radès, Tunisia	
10 km (road)	28:02 (Note: Brutto official time ["Gun Time"], net chip time is 27:59)	Tariq Ahmed Al Amri	15 January 2023	10K Valencia Ibercaja	Valencia, Spain	
Half marathon	1:02:58	Abdullah Abdulaziz Aljoud	29 March 2014	World Half Marathon Championships	Copenhagen, Denmark	
Marathon	2:16:58	Ali Saeed Al Shahrani	27 September 2026	Berlin Marathon	Berlin, Germany	
110 m hurdles	13.36 (+0.9 m/s)	Ahmed Al-Muwallad	4 June 2018	Josef Odložil Memorial	Prague, Czech Republic	
400 m hurdles	47.53	Hadi Soua'an Al-Somaily	27 September 2000	Olympic Games	Sydney, Australia	
2000 m steeplechase	5:37.80	Ali Al-Amri	2 October 2004	Pan Arab Schools Championships	Jeddah, Saudi Arabia	
3000 m steeplechase	8:08.14	Saad Shaddad Al-Asmari	16 July 2002		Stockholm, Sweden	
High jump	2.21 m	Jamal Fakhri Al-Qasim	8 July 2006		Lublin, Poland	
High jump	2.21 m	Hashim Issa Al-Oqabi	25 July 2007	Asian Championships	Amman, Jordan	
High jump	2.21 m	Nawaf Ahmad Al-Yami	15 June 2013		Salzburg, Austria	
Pole vault	5.70 m	Hussein Al-Hizam	26 March 2021	Texas Relays	Austin, United States	
Long jump	8.48 m (+0.6 m/s)	Mohamed Salman Al-Khuwalidi	2 July 2006		Sotteville-lès-Rouen, France	
Triple jump	17.07 m (+0.3 m/s)	Salem Mouled Al-Ahmadi	15 May 1997		Riyadh, Saudi Arabia	
Shot put	21.80 m	Mohammed Tolo	21 June 2024	Meeting de Atletismo Madrid	Madrid, Spain	
Discus throw	65.52 m	Sultan Mubarak Al-Dawoodi	18 June 2016		Biała Podlaska, Poland	
Hammer throw	70.96 m	Mohamed Al-Debissi	20 May 2023	Hallesche Werfertage	Halle, Germany	
Javelin throw	77.85 m	Ali Saleh Al-Jadani	14 August 1999		Irbid, Jordan	
Decathlon	7677 pts	Mohammed Jassim Alquraya	19–20 December 2011	Pan Arab Games	Doha, Qatar	
Decathlon	100m (wind) / Long jump (wind) / Shot put / High jump / 400m / 110m H (wind) / Discus / Pole vault / Javelin / 1500m; 10.60 (+1.5 m/s) / 7.12 m (−1.2 m/s) / 12.67 m / 2.00 m / 49.41 / 14.36 (−0.2 m/s) / 38.88 m / 4.30 m / 58.30 m / 4:52.19					
20 km walk (road)	2:10:24	Hazam Al-Outeibi	6 March 1986		Doha, Qatar	
50 km walk (road)						
4 × 100 m relay	38.98	Saudi Arabia; Kalifa Al-Saker; Mubarak Ata Mubarak; Salem Mubarak Al-Yami; Jamal Abdullah Al-Saffar	28 March 2002		Qatif, Saudi Arabia	
4 × 400 m relay	3:02.30	Saudi Arabia; Ismail Mohammed H Alsibyani; Mohammed Obaid A Alsalhi; Hamed Hamdan A Albishi; Yousef Ahmed M Masrahi	26 November 2010	Asian Games	Guangzhou, China	

=== Women ===
Event	Record	Athlete	Date	Meet	Place	Ref.
100 m	12.02 (−0.5 m/s)	Hibah Mohammed M. Mohammed	24 September 2026	Asian Games	Nagoya, Japan	
200 m	25.18 (+2.0 m/s)	Lujain Ibrahim Al-Humaid	4 May 2025	Arab Championships	Bir El Djir, Algeria	
400 m	59.17	Sarah Al-Helal	9 May 2025	Kingdom Athletics Women Championships	Taif, Saudi Arabia	
800 m	2:25.10	Fatamah Aamir	2 May 2026	Saudi Arabian Championships for Women	Al-Baha, Saudi Arabia	
1500 m	5:05.24	Hadil Al-Mabrouk	1 May 2026	Saudi Arabian Championships for Women	Al-Baha, Saudi Arabia	
3000 m	11:27.30	Sarah Attar	16 March 2013		Northridge, United States	
5000 m	20:33.42	Miznah Al-Nasser	18 May 2022	GCC Games	Kuwait City, Kuwait	
5 km (road)	20:47+	Sarah Attar	14 January 2018	Houston Half Marathon	Houston, United States	
10,000 m	45:25.40	Miznah Al-Nasser	16 May 2022	GCC Games	Kuwait City, Kuwait	
10 km (road)	41:29+	Sarah Attar	14 January 2018	Houston Half Marathon	Houston, United States	
15 km (road)	1:02:02+	Sarah Attar	14 January 2018	Houston Half Marathon	Houston, United States	
20 km (road)	1:22:28+	Sarah Attar	14 January 2018	Houston Half Marathon	Houston, United States	
Half marathon	1:26:47	Sarah Attar	14 January 2018	Houston Half Marathon	Houston, United States	
25 km (road)	1:49:18+	Sarah Attar	7 October 2018	Chicago Marathon	Chicago, United States	
30 km (road)	2:11:10+	Sarah Attar	7 October 2018	Chicago Marathon	Chicago, United States	
Marathon	3:07:16	Sarah Attar	7 October 2018	Chicago Marathon	Chicago, United States	
100 m hurdles	15.60 (+1.5 m/s) (Note: record set during heptathlon competition)	Sarah Al-Helal	14 May 2026	GCC Games	Doha, Qatar	
400 m hurdles	1:03.96	Deemah Al-Megbel	5 July 2026	British Columbia Championships	Coquitlam, Canada	
3000 m steeplechase						
High jump	1.50 m	Khadijah Aamer	2 May 2026	Saudi Arabian Championships for Women	Al-Baha, Saudi Arabia	
Pole vault						
Long jump	5.27 m (+0.1 m/s)	Khadijah Aamer	19 December 2025	1st National Qualifier meet for Women	Qatif, Saudi Arabia	
Triple jump						
Shot put	13.38 m	Noor M. Ibrahim	2 May 2026	Saudi Arabian Championships for Women	Al-Baha, Saudi Arabia	
Discus throw	46.07 m	Noor M. Ibrahim	17 April 2026	The Saudi National Championships for Girls (U16 & U20)	Qatif, Saudi Arabia	
Hammer throw	41.11 m	Areej Mehdi Al-Mutlak	23 June 2023	Arab Championships	Marrakech, Morocco	
Javelin throw	28.68 m (Note: record set during heptathlon competition)	Sarah Al-Helal	1 June 2024	West Asian Championships	Basra, Iraq	
Heptathlon	4067 pts	Sarah Al-Helal	14–15 May 2026	GCC Games	Doha, Qatar	
Heptathlon	100m H (wind) / High jump / Shot put / 200m (wind) / Long jump (wind) / Javelin / 800m; 15.60 (+1.5 m/s) / 1.39 m / 8.71 m / 27.22 (+1.3 m/s) / 5.02 m (+2.6 m/s) / 24.58 m / 2:27.63					
20 km walk (road)						
50 km walk (road)						
4 × 100 m relay	49.24	Saudi Arabia; Sarah Al-Helal; Hiba Mallam; Hibah Mohammed M. Mohammed; Lujain Ibrahim Al-Humaid	3 May 2025	Arab Championships	Bir El Djir, Algeria	
4 × 400 m relay						

== Indoor ==
=== Men ===
Event	Record	Athlete	Date	Meet	Place	Ref.
60 m	6.56	Yahya Saeed Al-Kahes	30 October 2007	Asian Indoor Games	Macau	
200 m	21.64 A	Mohammad Yaseen Al-Hasan	14 February 2014	Don Kirby Collegiate Elite	Albuquerque, United States	
400 m	46.35	Mazen Mawtan Al-Yasen	19 September 2017	Asian Indoor and Martial Arts Games	Ashgabat, Turkmenistan	
800 m	1:52.74	Ali Saad Al-Daraan	31 October 2007	Asian Indoor Games	Macau	
1500 m	3:48.73	Fayez Abdullah Al Subaie	1 March 2024	World Championships	Glasgow, United Kingdom	
1500 m	3:45.12 X	Mohammed Shaween	9 March 2012	World Championships	Istanbul, Turkey	
3000 m	7:44.64	Moukhled Al Outaibi	11 February 2006	Reunión Internacional de Atletismo	Valencia, Spain	
60 m hurdles	7.57	Ahmed Al-Muwallad	3 February 2018	Meeting Elite en Salle	Mondeville, France	
High jump	2.15 m	Hashem Issa Al-Oqabi	1 November 2007	Asian Indoor Games	Macau	
High jump	2.15 m	Jamal Fakhri Al-Qasim	1 November 2007	Asian Indoor Games	Macau	
Pole vault	5.70 m	Hussain Asim Al-Hizam	9 March 2018	NCAA Division I Championships	College Station, United States	
Long jump	8.24 m	Mohamed Salman Al-Khuwalidi	16 February 2008	Asian Championships	Doha, Qatar	
Triple jump	16.30 m	Salem Mouled Al-Ahmadi	7 March 1997	World Championships	Paris, France	
Shot put	19.39 m	Sultan Abdulmajeed Al-Hebshi	2 November 2009	Asian Indoor Games	Hanoi, Vietnam	
Heptathlon	5791 pts	Mohammed Al-Qaree	1-2 November 2009	Asian Indoor Games	Hanoi, Vietnam	
Heptathlon	60m / Long jump / Shot put / High jump / 60m H / Pole vault / 1000m; 6.84 / 7.35 m / 13.25 m / 2.06 m / 8.17 / 4.40 m / 2:52.04					
5000 m walk						
4 × 400 m relay	3:10.31	Saudi Arabia; Yousef Masrahi; Ismail Al-Sabiani; Hamed Al-Bishi; Bandar Sharahili	2 November 2009	Asian Indoor Games	Hanoi, Vietnam	

=== Women ===
Event	Record	Athlete	Date	Meet	Place	Ref.
60 m	8.15	Lujain Ibrahim Al-Humaid	10 February 2023	Asian Championships	Astana, Kazakhstan	
200 m						
400 m						
800 m						
1500 m						
3000 m						
60 m hurdles						
High jump						
Pole vault						
Long jump						
Triple jump						
Shot put						
Pentathlon						
Pentathlon	60m H / High jump / Shot put / Long jump / 800m					
3000 m walk						
4 × 400 m relay						
