= Athletics at the 2022 GCC Games =

- Dates: 16–19 May
- Host city: Kuwait City, Kuwait
- Venue: Ahmed Al Rashdan Track & Field stadium
- Participation: ~237 athletes from 6 nations

The athletics competitions at the 2022 GCC Games took place between 16 and 19 May at the Ahmed Al Rashdan Track & Field stadium in Kuwait City.

== Medal summary ==
=== Men ===
| Event | Gold | | Silver | | Bronze | |
|---|---|---|---|---|---|---|
| 100 m (wind: +2.3 m/s) | Tosin Ogunode; Qatar | 10.05 | Abdullah Abkar Mohammed; Saudi Arabia | 10.21 | Barakat Al-Harthi; Oman | 10.30 |
| 200 m (wind: +0.4 m/s) | Mohamed Yacoub Salem; Bahrain | 20.91 | Fahad Mohamed Al-Subaie; Saudi Arabia | 20.92 | Mahmoud Hafiz Ibrahim; Saudi Arabia | 21.13 |
| 400 m | Ammar Ismail Yahya Ibrahim; Qatar | 45.76 | Mazen Al-Yassin; Saudi Arabia | 45.83 | Ali Khamis Abbas; Bahrain | 45.96 |
| 800 m | Abdirahman Saeed Hassan; Qatar | 1:49.73 | Abdulrahman Musaeb Balla; Qatar | 1:49.83 | Ebrahim Alzofairi; Kuwait | 1:49.91 |
| 1500 m | Abdirahman Hassan; Qatar | 4:02.80 | Musaab Ali; Qatar | 4:04.20 | Khaled Mohamed Al-Harbi; Kuwait | 4:06.20 |
| 5000 m | Albert Rop; Bahrain | 13:44.70 | Dawit Fikadu; Bahrain | 13:48.06 | Youssef Asiri; Saudi Arabia | 14:14.97 |
| 10,000 m | Albert Rop; Bahrain | 29:15.97 | Abraham Neremwa; Bahrain | 29:30.00 | Abdulrahman Abdulrahman; Kuwait | 30:39.25 NR |
| 110 m hurdles (wind: +3.7 m/s) | Yaqoub Al-Yoha; Kuwait | 13.65 | Saeed Othman Zamzoun Al-Absi; Qatar | 14.08 | Khalfan Al-Jabri; Oman | 15.04 |
| 400 m hurdles | Ashraf Hussen Osman; Qatar | 50.27 | Mohammed Palmuowi; Saudi Arabia | 50.60 | Muath Ali Al-Saad; Saudi Arabia | 53.34 |
| 3000 m steeplechase | John Kibet Koech; Bahrain | 8:46.96 | Evans Chematot; Bahrain | 8:53.42 | Wissam Nasser Al-Farisi; Saudi Arabia | 9:05.29 |
| 4 × 100 m relay | Saudi Arabia; Mohamed Daoud Abdullah; Fahhad Mohammed Al-Subaie; Nasser Mahmoud Mohammed; Abdullah Abkar Mohammed | 39.06 | Oman; Ali Anwar Ali Al-Balushi; Barakat Al-Harthi; Ammar Al-Saifi; Mohamed Obaid Al-Saadi | 39.72 | Bahrain; Abdo Barka; Alemad Mohamed; Saeed Al-Khaldi; Omar Ebrahim | 39.73 |
| 4 × 400 m relay | Bahrain; Husain Mohamed Al-Doseri; Yusuf Ali Abbas; Musa Isah; Ali Khamis Khamis | 3:06.20 | Saudi Arabia; Mazen Al-Yassin; Ibrahim Mohammed Futayni; Hassan Abdo; Youssef Ahmed Masrahi | 3:06.37 | Qatar; Ismail Doudai Abakar; Ammar Ismail Yahia Ibrahim; Ashraf Hussen Osman; Mohamed Nasir Abbas | 3:07.27 |
| High jump | Mutaz Essa Barshim; Qatar; Hamdi Mahamat Alamine Saleh; Qatar | 2.15 m | no silver medal awarded | | Khaled Al-Massad; Kuwait | 2.10 m |
| Pole vault | Hussain Asim Al-Hizam; Saudi Arabia | 5.61 m | Ali Makki Al-Sabagha; Kuwait | 4.80 m | Saeed Abdullah Mobarak; Saudi Arabia | 4.30 m |
| Long jump | Salem Saleh El-Jerbi; Oman | 7.58 m | Abdullah Al-Morshed; Kuwait | 7.45 m | Hamoud Al-Wani; Saudi Arabia | 7.16 m |
| Triple jump | Hassan Nasser Darweesh; Saudi Arabia | 16.00 m | Salem Al-Rawahi; Oman | 15.85 m | Salem Saleh El-Jerbi; Oman | 15.53 m NR |
| Shot put | Abdelrahman Mahmoud; Bahrain | 20.74 m | Mohamed Daouda Tolo; Saudi Arabia | 20.49 m | Meshari Suroor Saad; Kuwait | 17.95 m |
| Discus throw | Essa Al-Zenkawi; Kuwait | 60.20 m | Mouad Mohamed Ibrahim; Qatar | 58.87 m | Oussama Hassan Al-Aqili; Saudi Arabia | 51.97 m |
| Hammer throw | Ahmed Amgad Al-Saifi; Qatar | 69.40 m | Mohamed Ali Al-Zankawi; Kuwait | 66.97 m | Mahmoud El-Gohary; Bahrain | 64.68 m NR |
| Javelin throw | Ali Essa Abdelghani; Saudi Arabia | 71.15 m | Abdulrahman Al-Azemi; Kuwait | 66.97 m | Ahmed Al-Yassin; Saudi Arabia | 58.16 m |
| Decathlon | Ahmed Al-Yassin; Saudi Arabia | 7270 pts | Saeed Abdullah Mobarak; Saudi Arabia | 7017 pts | Majed Radhi Mubarak Al-Sayed; Kuwait | 6712 pts |

=== Women ===
| Event | Gold | | Silver | | Bronze | |
|---|---|---|---|---|---|---|
| 100 m (wind: +1.8 m/s) | Mazoon Al-Alawi; Oman | 11.47 NR | Mudhawi Al-Shammari; Kuwait | 11.52 NR | Hajar Saad Al-Khaldi; Bahrain | 11.56 |
| 200 m (wind: +1.5 m/s) | Mudhawi Al-Shammari; Kuwait | 23.74 NR | Zenab Mahamat; Bahrain | 23.88 | Iman Isa Jassim; Bahrain | 24.35 |
| 400 m | Mona Al-Mubarak; Kuwait | 52.80 | Awatif Amulyayo Ahmed; Bahrain | 56.80 | Fatma Al-Blooshi; United Arab Emirates | 66.53 |
| 800 m | Tigist Mekonen; Bahrain | 2:11.25 | Amal Al-Roumi; Kuwait | 2:19.27 | Ruqayya Al-Marzooqi; United Arab Emirates | 2:31.15 |
| 1500 m | Winfred Yavi; Bahrain | 4:07.24 | Tigist Mekonen; Bahrain | 4:20.44 | Amal Al-Roumi; Kuwait | 4:50.11 |
| 5000 m | Bontu Edao Rebitu; Bahrain | 15:51.04 | Tigist Gashaw; Bahrain | 15:53.76 | Miznah Al-Nassar; Saudi Arabia | 20:33.42 NR |
| 10,000 m | Bontu Edao Rebitu; Bahrain | 34:26.27 | Violah Jepchumba; Bahrain | 34:33.62 | Miznah Al-Nassar; Saudi Arabia | 45:25.40 NR |
| 100 m hurdles (wind: +1.6 m/s) | Aminat Yusuf Jamal; Bahrain | 13.68 | Mazoon Al-Alawi; Oman | 13.87 NR | Saleha Lahdan; Bahrain | 15.47 |
| 400 m hurdles | Aminat Yusuf Jamal; Bahrain | 58.55 | Saleha Lahdan; Bahrain | 66.86 | Saja Saadouin; Qatar | 68.46 NR |
| 3000 m steeplechase | Winfred Yavi; Bahrain | 9:23.11 | Ruth Jebet; Bahrain | 9:41.72 | Dana Al-Zanki; Kuwait | 16:46.33 NR |
| 4 × 100 m relay | Kuwait; Shikha Al-Qattan; Mudahawi Al-Shammari; Salsabeel Al-Sayar; Nadiah Al-Haqan | 49.12 NR | Bahrain; Hajar Al-Khaldi; Iman Essa; Zenab Mahamat; Fatima Mubarak | 50.68 | United Arab Emirates; Latifa Al-Kaabi; Abeer Al-Blooshi; Fatma Al-Blooshi; Mahra Enqelya | 52.25 NR |
| 4 × 400 m relay | Bahrain; Awatif Ahmed; Aminat Jamal; Saleha Lahdan; Muna Mubarak | 3:48.00 | United Arab Emirates; Fatma Al-Blooshi; Ruqayya Al-Marzooqi; Mahra Enqelya; Meera Al-Maazmi | 4:20.55 | Kuwait; Amal Al-Roumi; Fajer Al-Suraiei; Dimah Rashed; Fatemah Failakawi | 4:25.16 NR |
| High jump | Nadiah Al-Haqan; Kuwait | 1.53 m =NR | Dalal Faraj; Kuwait | 1.50 m | Raghad Abu Arish; Saudi Arabia | 1.45 m NR |
| Pole vault | Samar Mansouri; Qatar | 3.40 m NR | Only one finisher | | | |
| Long jump | Fatima Moubarak; Bahrain | 5.84 m (w) | Latifa Al-Kaabi; United Arab Emirates | 5.34 m NR | Maryam Hasan; Kuwait | 5.15 m (w) |
| Triple jump | Latifa Al-Kaabi; United Arab Emirates | 11.30 m NR | Maryam Hasan; Kuwait | 10.54 m NR | Samar Mansouri; Qatar | 10.47 m (w) |
| Shot put | Noora Salem Jassem; Bahrain | 14.11 m | Shekha Al-Shaqhan; Kuwait | 11.87 m NR | Fatima Al-Hosani; United Arab Emirates | 11.84 m |
| Discus throw | Fatima Al-Hosani; United Arab Emirates | 40.98 m | Noora Salem Jassem; Bahrain | 38.82 m | Aisha Al-Khedher; Kuwait | 38.27 m |
| Hammer throw | Hanna Saeed Al-Tokya; Oman | 49.36 m NR | Rania Raed Al-Naji; Qatar | 47.00 m | Wedad Robari; United Arab Emirates | 40.63 m |
| Javelin throw | Hiba Al-Asmi; Oman | 36.40 m | Salsabeel Al-Sayar; Kuwait | 30.70 m | Aisha Al-Khedher; Kuwait | 23.70 m |
| Heptathlon | Salsabeel Al-Sayar; Kuwait | 3478 pts | Lial Tamam; Qatar | 3405 pts | Saja Saadoun; Qatar | 3050 pts |

== Medal table ==
| Rank | Nation | Gold | Silver | Bronze | Total |
|---|---|---|---|---|---|
| 1 | Bahrain (BHR) | 17 | 12 | 6 | 35 |
| 2 | Qatar (QAT) | 9 | 6 | 4 | 19 |
| 3 | Kuwait (KUW) | 6 | 10 | 12 | 28 |
| 4 | Saudi Arabia (KSA) | 5 | 7 | 12 | 24 |
| 5 | Oman (OMA) | 4 | 3 | 4 | 11 |
| 6 | United Arab Emirates (UAE) | 2 | 2 | 5 | 9 |
| Totals (6 entries) | | 43 | 40 | 43 | 126 |
