= Athletics at the 2026 GCC Games =

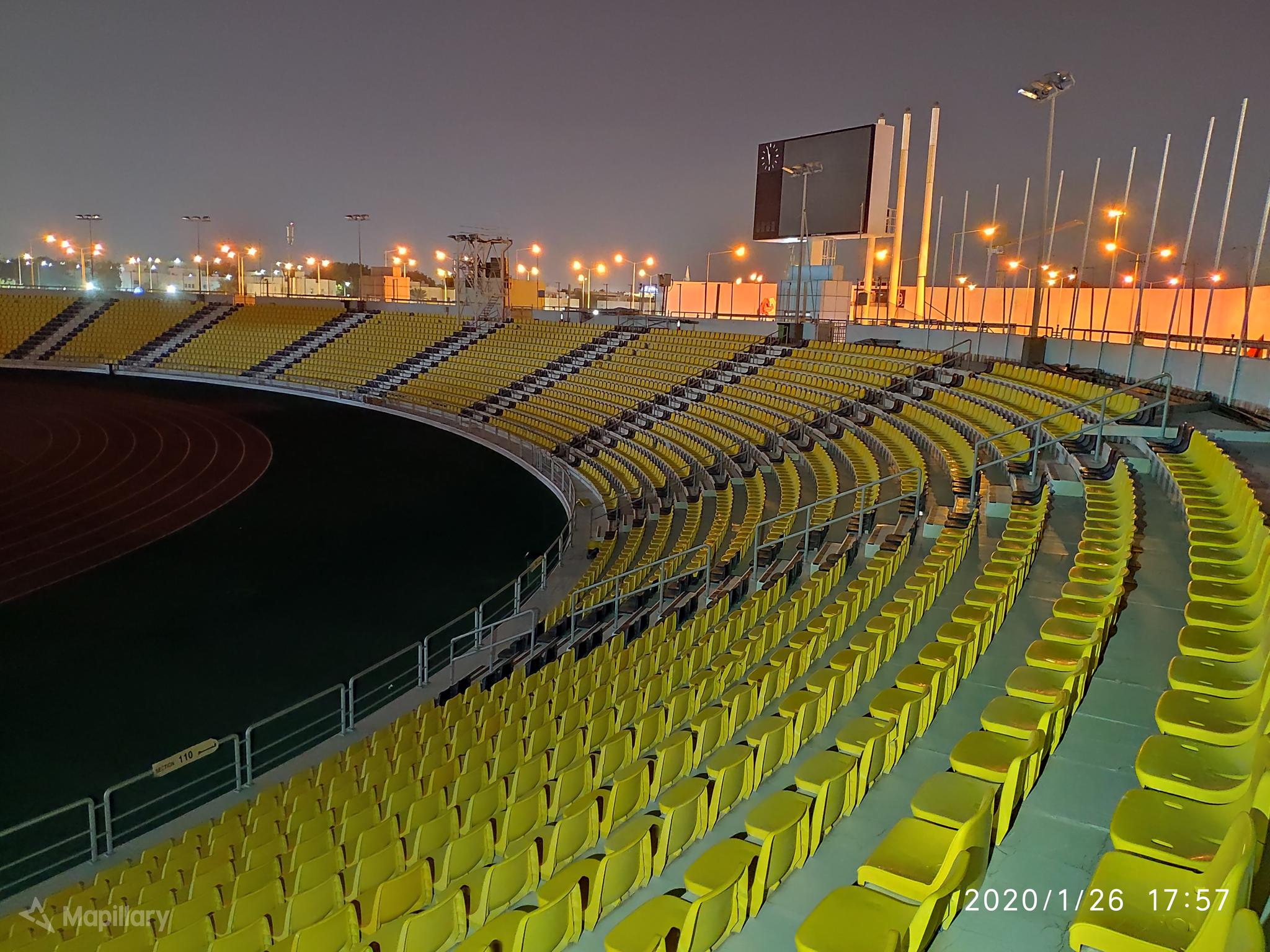
- Dates: 14–17 May
- Host city: Doha, Qatar
- Venue: Suheim bin Hamad Stadium
- Events: 41
- Participation: 6 nations

The athletics competitions at the 2026 GCC Games took place between 14 and 17 May at the Suheim bin Hamad Stadium in Doha, Qatar.

== Medal summary ==
=== Men ===
Event	Gold		Silver		Bronze	
100 m (wind: +1.1 m/s)	Ali Anwar Al-Balushi; Oman	10.13	Mulhim Al-Balushi; Qatar	10.28	Abdulaziz Abdou Atafi; Saudi Arabia	10.37
200 m (wind: +3.1 m/s)	Ali Anwar Al-Balushi; Oman	20.48	Abdulaziz Abdou Atafi; Saudi Arabia	20.50	Ali Mohamed Haji; Bahrain	20.80
400 m	Ammar Ismail Yahya Ibrahim; Qatar	45.51	Ashraf Hussen Osman; Qatar	45.76	Ahmed Khalifa Ali Aal-Abdusalam; Oman	48.88
800 m	Ebrahim Al-Zofairi; Kuwait	1:47.98	Hatim Oulghazi; Qatar	1:48.48	Said Mubarik Abdi; Qatar	1:48.67
1500 m	Mubarik Abdi Said; Qatar	4:03.28	Zakaria Al-Ahlaami; Qatar	4:03.90	Bader Al-Sweed; Kuwait	4:04.09
5000 m	Abdikani Mohamed Hamid; Bahrain	14:54.95	Dawit Fikadu; Bahrain	15:03.19	Obaid Al-Neaimi; United Arab Emirates	16:06.57
10,000 m	Abdikani Mohamed Hamid; Bahrain	30:37.70	Dawit Fikadu; Bahrain	30:41.11	Obaid Al-Neaimi; United Arab Emirates	32:29.43
110 m hurdles (wind: +2.4 m/s)	Yaqoub Al-Yoha; Kuwait	13.67	Oumar Doudai Abakar; Qatar	14.08	Salem Bakheet; Bahrain	15.02
400 m hurdles	Abderrahmane Samba; Qatar	48.85	Bassem Hemeida; Qatar	50.60	Muath Abdalla; United Arab Emirates	58.04
3000 m steeplechase	Zakaria Al-Ahlaami; Qatar	8:35.13	Yaser Salem Bagharab; Qatar	9:08.58	Only 2 competitors	
4 × 100 m relay	Oman; Rashid Al-Aasmi; Mulhim Al-Balushi; Mohammed Obaid Al-Saadi; Ali Anwar Al-Balushi	40.08	United Arab Emirates	47.38	Only two teams	
4 × 400 m relay	Qatar; Mahamat Abaker Abdrahman; Mubarak Abdulkarim Musa; Samer Moosa Hassan; Bassem Hemeida	3:15.50	Only one team			
5000 m walk	Mabrook Jahzah; Qatar	24:21.75	Issa Ahmed; Qatar	32:27.68	Ayoob Sarwashi; United Arab Emirates	34:13.80
High jump	Mutaz Essa Barshim; Qatar; Fathi Abdul Ghafoor; Oman	2.16 m	Not awarded		Ahmed Abdullah Al-Tarouti; Saudi Arabia	2.09 m
Pole vault	Seifeldin Abdelsalam; Qatar	5.55 m	Hussain Asim Al-Hizam; Saudi Arabia	5.50 m	Mohammed Radhi Al-Qudaihi; Saudi Arabia	5.00 m
Long jump	Ahmed Abdullah Al-Tarouti; Saudi Arabia	7.45 m	Abdullah Al-Azmi; Kuwait	7.35 m (w)	Not awarded	
Triple jump	Salem Al-Rawahi; Oman	15.31 m	Abdulrahman Ahmed Adam; Saudi Arabia	14.96 m	Only two competitors	
Shot put	Mohamed Daouda Tolo; Saudi Arabia	19.21 m	Hamza Souissi; Qatar	18.55 m	Abdelrahman Mahmoud; Bahrain	18.48 m
Discus throw	Essa Al-Zenkawi; Kuwait	59.74 m	Mouad Mohamed Ibrahim; Qatar	58.60 m	Mahamat Gueme; Qatar	57.49 m
Hammer throw	Ashraf Amgad El-Seify; Qatar	70.18 m	Mohammed Al-Dubaisi; Saudi Arabia	69.36 m	Ahmed Amgad Al-Saifi; Qatar	65.89 m
Javelin throw	Ali Essa Abdelghani; Saudi Arabia	72.04 m	Abdulrahman Al-Azemi; Kuwait	68.27 m	Nasser Saeed Al-Katheeri; United Arab Emirates	24.74 m
Decathlon	Beedh Ali Hassan; Saudi Arabia	7281 pts	Mohsen Hassan Dabbous; Saudi Arabia	6525 pts	Abdullah Adnane Al-Ameeri; Kuwait	5258 pts

=== Women ===
Event	Gold		Silver		Bronze	
100 m (wind: +2.1 m/s)	Raihanah Garoubah; Bahrain	11.35	Laila Kamal; Bahrain	11.38	Dana Noor Salem; Qatar	11.74
200 m (wind: +2.7 m/s)	Raihanah Garoubah; Bahrain	23.23	Aisha Abdulla; Bahrain	23.40	Dana Noor Salem; Qatar	24.44
400 m	Kemi Adekoya; Bahrain	51.78	Aisha Abdulla; Bahrain	53.69	Hanaa Juma Masi Al-Qassimi; Oman	60.17
800 m	Nelly Jepkosgei; Bahrain	2:00.54	Zeinab Moussa Ali Mahamat; Kuwait	2:09.18	Meryem Salek; Qatar	2:20.23
1500 m	Nelly Jepkosgei; Bahrain	4:22.56	Tigist Mekonen; Bahrain	4:37.37	Amal Al-Roumi; Kuwait	5:09.74
100 m hurdles (wind: +2.3 m/s)	Sara Shams Ali; Qatar	13.87	Aljazi Farhan; Kuwait	16.21	Shahd Mohamed; Qatar	22.53
400 m hurdles	Sara Shams Ali; Qatar	61.94	Mahra Abderahim Salem Khamis Anklia; United Arab Emirates	62.76	Not awarded	
3000 m steeplechase	Tigist Mekonen; Bahrain	10:30.41	Haya Mohamed Al-Tawager; Kuwait	11:54.69	Alya Almheiri; United Arab Emirates	12:08.73
4 × 100 m relay	Bahrain; Laila Kamal; Raihanah Garoubah; Zeinab Moussa Ali Mahamat; Ofonime Odiong	45.09	Oman	49.92	United Arab Emirates	54.39
4 × 400 m relay	Bahrain; Zeinab Moussa Ali Mahamat; Aisha Abdulla; Sufian Abdulghani; Kemi Adekoya	3:34.29	Qatar	3:56.95	Only two teams	
High jump	Aliya Faiq Fua'Ad Al Mughairi; Oman	1.60 m	Alaa Soliman; Qatar	1.40 m	Salma Hamed; Qatar	1.40 m
Pole vault	Samar Mansouri; Qatar	3.50 m NR	Shahad Mubaker; United Arab Emirates	3.25 m	Alyaziah Doei; United Arab Emirates	2.80 m
Long jump	Mazoon Al-Alawi; Oman	5.72 m	Aisha Al-Kheder; Kuwait	5.53 m	Salma Hamed; Qatar	4.88 m
Triple jump	Aisha Al-Kheder; Kuwait	11.47 m	Samar Mansouri; Qatar	10.18 m	Only two starters	
Shot put	Noora Salem Jassem; Bahrain	15.29 m	Fatima Al-Hosani; United Arab Emirates	13.13 m	Shekha Al-Shaqhan; Kuwait	12.02 m
Discus throw	Fatima Al-Hosani; United Arab Emirates	48.37 m	Noora Salem Jassem; Bahrain	44.43 m	Salma Al-Marri; United Arab Emirates	44.08 m
Hammer throw	Salma Al-Marri; United Arab Emirates	52.63 m	Fajr Khaled Ghulam; Kuwait	45.34 m	Shekha Al-Saqhan; Kuwait	19.17 m
Heptathlon	Sarah Abdel Karim Al-Hilal; Saudi Arabia	4067 pts	Aljazi Farhan; Kuwait	4031 pts	Maryam Fawzy Al-Matar; Saudi Arabia	3721 pts

=== Mixed ===
Event	Gold		Silver		Bronze
4 × 400 metres relay	Bahrain; Alaa Sami; Sufian Abdulghani; Abdisamad Hirsi; Kemi Adekoya	3:21.44	Qatar; Ammar Ismail Yahya Ibrahim; Shahd Ashraf; Ashraf Hussen Osman; Awatif Sabah Abdulrahman	3:23.37	Only two teams

== Medal table ==
* Host nation (Qatar)

Rank	Nation	Gold	Silver	Bronze	Total
1	Qatar (QAT)*	12	13	9	34
2	Bahrain (BHR)	12	8	3	23
3	Oman (OMA)	7	2	2	11
4	Saudi Arabia (KSA)	5	5	4	14
5	Kuwait (KUW)	4	7	5	16
6	United Arab Emirates (UAE)	2	4	9	15
Totals (6 entries)		42	39	32	113
