= List of Kuwaiti records in athletics =

The following are the national records in athletics in Kuwait maintained by Kuwait Amateur Athletic Federation (KAAF).

== Outdoor ==
Key to tables: Awaiting ratification Record not kept by KAAF Not ratified or later rescined by KAAF

=== Men ===
Event	Record	Athlete	Date	Meet	Place	Ref.
100 m	10.27 (+1.8 m/s)	Meshaal Khalifa Al-Mutairi	4 June 2015	Asian Championships	Wuhan, China	
100 m	10.06 (+0.6 m/s)	Meshaal Khalifa Al-Mutairi	24 April 2015	Arab Championships	Manama, Bahrain	
200 m	20.41 (+0.2 m/s)	Fawzi Al-Shammari	9 September 2003		Amman, Jordan	
300 m	32.28	Fawzi Al-Shammari	10 August 2004		Ljubljana, Slovenia	
400 m	44.84	Yousef Karam	22 April 2019	Asian Championships	Doha, Qatar	
800 m	1:44.13	Mohammad Al-Azemi	3 July 2006		Athens, Greece	
1000 m	2:15.84	Mohammad Al-Azemi	5 June 2011	Meeting International Mohammed VI d'Athlétisme	Rabat, Morocco	
1500 m	3:37.95	Mohammad Al-Azemi	12 June 2013	Meeting Grand Prix IAAF de Dakar	Dakar, Senegal	
3000 m	8:26.77	Hussain Ali Kamal	28/30 May 2021		Kuwait City, Kuwait	
5000 m	14:16.26	Abdulrahman Al-Kandary	18 May 2022	GCC Games	Kuwait City, Kuwait	
10,000 m	30:39.25	Abdulrahman Al-Kandary	16 May 2022	GCC Games	Kuwait City, Kuwait	
10,000 m	30:29.73	Ali Saleh	9 November 1983		Kuwait City, Kuwait	
Half marathon	1:06:06 (Note: by World Athletics source, 1:06:01 by official result source)	Abdul Mohsen Al Ali	16 January 2022	Houston Half Marathon	Houston, United States	
Marathon	2:21:15	Abdul Mohsen Al-Ali	26 September 2021	Quad Cities Marathon	Moline, United States	
Marathon	2:19:17	Abdul Mohsen Al-Ali	12 February 2022	Mesa Marathon	Mesa, United States	
110 m hurdles	13.35 (+1.7 m/s)	Yaqoub Al-Youha	24 April 2019	Asian Championships	Doha, Qatar	
400 m hurdles	49.13	Bader Abdul Rahman Al-Fulaij	18 May 2002		Hyderabad, India	
3000 m steeplechase	8:35.62	Omar Awadh Al-Rashidi	29 May 2008		Algiers, Algeria	
High jump	2.20 m	Salem Al-Anezi	15 May 2004		Kuwait City, Kuwait	
High jump	2.20 m	Salem Al-Anezi	24 November 2007	Pan Arab Games	Cairo, Egypt	
Pole vault	5.26 m	Fahed Bader Al-Mershad	17 May 2011		Kuwait City, Kuwait	
Long jump	8.02 m (−0.9 m/s)	Saleh Al-Haddad	5 May 2009		Kuwait City, Kuwait	
Triple jump	16.75 m	Marzouk Abdallah Al-Yoha	1 August 1992	Olympic Games	Barcelona, Spain	
Shot put	19.54 m	Mohd Meshari Surour Saad	30 September 2016		Kuala Lumpur, Malaysia	
Discus throw	63.22 m	Essa Al-Zenkawi	27 April 2015	Arab Championships	Manama, Bahrain	
Hammer throw	79.74 m	Ali Mohamed Al-Zinkawi	2 September 2009		Celje, Slovenia	
Javelin throw	73.10 m	Ghanem Mabrouk Zaid Johar	11 August 1995		Budapest, Hungary	
Decathlon	7838 pts	Majed Radhi Mubarak Al-Sayed	22–23 April 2019	Asian Championships	Doha, Qatar	
Decathlon	100m (wind) / Long jump (wind) / Shot put / High jump / 400m / 110m H (wind) / Discus / Pole vault / Javelin / 1500m; 11.22 (+0.8 m/s) / 7.22 m (+0.2 m/s) / 12.98 m / 1.99 m / 48.96 / 15.05 (+2.2 m/s) / 37.66 m / 4.80 m / 56.28 m / 4:15.06					
20 km walk (road)	1:51:25	Ateya Seoud Khallaf	6 November 1983		Kuwait City, Kuwait	
50 km walk (road)						
4 × 100 m relay	39.75	Kuwait; I. Al-Youha; Y. Al-Youha; Abdulaziz Al-Mandeel; Meshaal Al-Mutairi	26 April 2015	Arab Championships	Manama, Bahrain	
4 × 400 m relay	3:04.82	Kuwait; Bader Abdul Rahman Al-Fulaij; Fawzi Al-Shammari; Khaled Atiq Al-Johar; Meshaal Saad Al-Harbi	4 July 2001		Beirut, Lebanon	

=== Women ===
Event	Record	Athlete	Date	Meet	Place	Ref.
100 m	11.52 (+1.8 m/s)	Mudhawi Al-Shammari	16 May 2022	GCC Games	Kuwait City, Kuwait	
200 m	23.74 (+1.5 m/s)	Mudhawi Al-Shammari	18 May 2022	GCC Games	Kuwait City, Kuwait	
400 m	57.00	Mudhawi Al-Shammari	27 October 2019		Kuwait City, Kuwait	
400 m	56.35	Madhawi Saad Abdullah Al-Shammari	13 March 2024	National Women Pre-Championships	Kuwait City, Kuwait	
800 m	2:08.91	Danah Al-Nasrallah	21 May 2016	Running Factory Windsor Open	Windsor, Canada	
1500 m	4:36.21	Danah Al-Nasrallah	21 April 2017	Jesse Owens University Classic	Columbus, United States	
3000 m	12:17.1 h	Danah Al-Nasrallah	20 April 2005		Southridge, United States	
3000 m	12:04.21	Lulwa Ghanem Saqir	14 March 2024	National Women Pre-Championships	Kuwait City, Kuwait	
5000 m	20:01.6 h	Tayba Nader Mohamed Al-Nouri	14 November 2020		Kuwait City, Kuwait	
5000 m	19:29.12	Haya Ahmed Al-Rifai	10 February 2024	Arab Women Sports Tournament	Sharjah, United Arab Emirates	
10,000 m	43:03.88	Tayba Nader Mohamed Al-Nouri	7 April 2019		Cairo, Egypt	
Half marathon	1:28:23	Haya Al-Refai	2 March 2024	Gulf Bank 642 Half Marathon	Kuwait City, Kuwait	
Marathon	3:32:26	Taiba Al-Nouri	16 January 2016	Spark Marathon	Kuwait City, Kuwait	
100 m hurdles	15.57 NWI	Rahaf Hussein	10 February 2018		Sharjah, United Arab Emirates	
400 m hurdles	1:14.26	Lina Samir Al-Qallaf	14 March 2015	4th GCC Women's Games	Muscat, Oman	
3000 m steeplechase	16:46.33	Dana Hussein Al-Zanki	17 May 2022	GCC Games	Kuwait City, Kuwait	
3000 m steeplechase	16:20.37	Razan Hussein Rajab	13 March 2024	National Women Pre-Championships	Kuwait City, Kuwait	
High jump	1.80 m	Yasmeen Roy	10 November 2026	Youth Olympic Games	Dakar, Senegal	
Pole vault	1.80 m	Fatima Mathni Taoufik	11 September 2012		Kuwait City, Kuwait	
Long jump	5.17 m NWI	Mariam Kazem Malallah	27 October 2019		Kuwait City, Kuwait	
Long jump	5.35 m (+1.1 m/s)	Aisha Waleed Al-Khuder	27 April 2023	West Asian Championships	Doha, Qatar	
Long jump	5.45 m (+0.3 m/s)	Aisha Waleed Al-Khuder	20 June 2023	Arab Championships	Marrakech, Morocco	
Long jump	5.66 m NWI	Aisha Waleed Al-Khuder	30 May 2024	West Asian Championships	Basra, Iraq	
Triple jump	10.54 m (+1.7 m/s)	Maryam Hasan	17 May 2022	GCC Games	Kuwait City, Kuwait	
Shot put	11.87 m	Shekha Al-Shaqhan	16 May 2022	GCC Games	Kuwait City, Kuwait	
Discus throw	39.24 m	Aisha Waleed Al-Khuder	14 March 2015	4th GCC Women's Games	Muscat, Oman	
Discus throw	39.32 m	Aisha Waleed Al-Khuder	29 April 2023	West Asian Championships	Doha, Qatar	
Discus throw	39.55 m	Aisha Walid Badr Al-Khader	14 March 2024	National Women Pre-Championships	Kuwait City, Kuwait	
Hammer throw	39.09 m	Batool Nasir Al-Din	15 March 2015	4th GCC Women's Games	Muscat, Oman	
Hammer throw	40.81 m	Fajr Mandani	27 April 2023	West Asian Championships	Doha, Qatar	
Javelin throw	35.01 m	Salsabeel Khaled Al-Sayyar	27 October 2019		Kuwait City, Kuwait	
Javelin throw	35.45 m	Salsabeel Khaled Al-Sayyar	28 April 2023	West Asian Championships	Doha, Qatar	
Heptathlon	3790 pts h NWI	Salsabeel Khaled Al-Sayyar	28–29 October 2019		Kuwait City, Kuwait	
Heptathlon	100m H (wind) / High jump / Shot put / 200m (wind) / Long jump (wind) / Javelin / 800m; 15.0 h (NWI) / 1.44 m / 10.23 m / 27.37 (NWI) / 4.81 m (NWI) / 30.11 m / 3:18.54					
Heptathlon	3950 pts	Salsabeel Khaled Al-Sayar	31 May–1 June 2024	West Asian Championships	Basra, Iraq	
Heptathlon	100m H (wind) / High jump / Shot put / 200m (wind) / Long jump (wind) / Javelin / 800m; 16.15 (−0.1 m/s) / 1.41 m / 10.90 m / 27.60 (±0.0 m/s) / 4.97 m (NWI) / 32.54 m / 2:55.98					
20 km walk (road)						
50 km walk (road)						
4 × 100 m relay	49.12	Kuwait; Shikha Al-Khattan; Mudhawi Al-Shammari; Salsabeel Al-Sayar; Nadiah Al-Haqan	17 May 2022	GCC Games	Kuwait City, Kuwait	
4 × 400 m relay	4:25.16	Kuwait; Amal Al-Roumi; Fajer Al-Suraiei; Dimah Rashed; Fatemah Failakawi	18 May 2022	GCC Games	Kuwait City, Kuwait	

=== Mixed ===
Event	Record	Athlete	Date	Meet	Place	Ref.
4 × 400 m relay	3:32.44	Kuwait; J. W. Al-Mas; M. F. Jaber; A. Al-Roumi; Mudhawi Al-Shammari	26 April 2023	West Asian Championships	Doha, Qatar	

== Indoor ==
=== Men ===
Event	Record	Athlete	Date	Meet	Place	Ref.
60 m	6.78	Saleh Abdelaziz Al-Haddad	12 February 2009		Tehran, Iran	
200 m	22.13	Khaled Atiq Al-Johar	9 February 2001		Rasht, Iran	
400 m	46.26	Youssef Karam	8 February 2020	Copernicus Cup	Toruń, Poland	
800 m	1:47.37	Mohammad Al-Azemi	19 February 2012	Asian Championships	Hangzhou, China	
800 m	1:46.80	Ebrahim Al-Zofairi	19 February 2024	Asian Championships	Tehran, Iran	
1500 m	3:46.69	Omar Awadh Al-Rashidi	2 November 2009	Asian Indoor Games	Hanoi, Vietnam	
3000 m	8:13.15	Omar Awadh Al-Rashid	1 November 2007	Asian Indoor Games	Macau	
60 m hurdles	7.52	Yaqoub Al-Youha	21 February 2020	Villa de Madrid Indoor Meeting	Madrid, Spain	
High jump	2.15 m	Salem Sayar Ibrahim Al-Anezi	1 November 2007	Asian Indoor Games	Macau	
Pole vault	5.10 m	Ali Makki Al-Sabagha	11 February 2006	Asian Championships	Pattaya, Thailand	
Pole vault	5.10 m	Ali Makki Al-Sabagha	30 October 2007	Asian Indoor Games	Macau	
Long jump	7.94 m	Saleh Al-Haddad	15 February 2014	Asian Championships	Hangzhou, China	
Triple jump	16.26 m	Khaled Saeed Al-Subaie	3 February 2018	Asian Championships	Tehran, Iran	
Shot put	19.08 m	Ahmad Hassan Gholoum	19 February 2012	Asian Championships	Hangzhou, China	
Heptathlon	5228 pts	Majed Radhi Al-Sayed	1–2 February 2018	Asian Championships	Tehran, Iran	
Heptathlon	60m / Long jump / Shot put / High jump / 60m H / Pole vault / 1000m; 7.23 / 7.00 m / 12.08 m / 1.88 m / 8.64 / 4.40 m / 2:51.78					
5000 m walk	29:22.31 (Note: by World Athletics but not recognised by federation)	Jasem Al-Mashmoum	12 February 1998		Rasht, Iran	
4 × 400 m relay	3:14.14	Kuwait; Khaled Atiq Al-Johar; Bader Abdul Rahman Al-Fulaij; Mechel Al-Harbi; Fawzi Al-Shammari	10 March 2001	World Championships	Lisbon, Portugal	

=== Women ===
Event	Record	Athlete	Date	Meet	Place	Ref.
60 m	7.57	Mudhawi Al-Shammari	5 February 2021		Istanbul, Turkey	
200 m	27.99 OT	Danah Al-Nasrallah	18 February 2011		Allendale, United States	
400 m	1:01.54 OT	Danah Al-Nasrallah	18 February 2011		Allendale, United States	
800 m	2:09.68 OT	Danah Al-Nasrallah	30 January 2016	SVSU Jets Pizza Invitational	Saginaw, United States	
1500 m	4:29.62	Amal Al-Roumi	11 February 2023	Asian Championships	Astana, Kazakhstan	
Mile	4:53.46 OT	Danah Al-Nasrallah	15 January 2016	GVSU Bob Eubanks Open	Allendale, United States	
3000 m	10:39.41 OT	Danah Al-Nasrallah	19 January 2018	GVSU Open	Allendale, United States	
60 m hurdles						
High jump						
Pole vault						
Long jump						
Triple jump						
Shot put	8.82 m	Bashir Al-Mutabaghi	31 October 2009	Asian Indoor Games	Hanoi, Vietnam	
Pentathlon						
Pentathlon	60m H / High jump / Shot put / Long jump / 800m					
3000 m walk						
4 × 400 m relay						
