= List of Omani records in athletics =

The following are the national records in athletics in Oman maintained by Oman Athletic Association (OAA).

== Outdoor ==
Key to tables: Awaiting ratification Record not kept by OAA Not ratified or later rescined by OAA

=== Men ===
Event	Record	Athlete	Date	Meet	Place	Ref.
100 m	9.97 (+1.7 m/s)	Barakat Al-Harthi	9 July 2018	West Asian Championships	Amman, Jordan	
200 m	20.74 (−0.1 m/s)	Mohamed Obaid Al-Saadi	28 August 2018	Asian Games	Jakarta, Indonesia	
200 m	20.62 (−0.1 m/s)	Mohamed Obaid Al-Saadi	24 June 2023	Arab Championships	Marrakech, Morocco	
300 m	32.38	Mohamed Amer Al-Malky	16 July 1988		Gateshead, United Kingdom	
400 m	44.56	Mohamed Amer Al-Malky	12 August 1988		Budapest, Hungary	
800 m	1:47.68	Husain Mohsin Al-Farsi	2 October 2023	Asian Games	Hangzhou, China	
1500 m	3:48.92	Qais Salim Al-Mahrooqi	11 June 2012	Josef Odložil Memorial	Prague, Czech Republic	
1500 m	3:46.88	Hussein Mohsen Al-Farsi	29 April 2023	West Asian Championships	Doha, Qatar	
3000 m	8:31.3	Qais Salim Al-Mahrooqi	2009		Rabat, Morocco	
5000 m	14:18.96	Qais Salim Al-Mahrooqi	21 November 2010	Asian Games	Guangzhou, China	
10,000 m	31:02.00	Ahmad Saeed Al-Rawahi	7 November 1997		Bangkok, Thailand	
Half marathon	1:10:03		26 January 2024		Muscat, Oman	
Half marathon	1:09:49 (Note: no official confirmation about the course measurement)	Abdullah Al-Qarini	25 February 2023	Al Seeb Half Marathon	Muscat, Oman	
25 km (road)	1:35:46+	Khalid Al-Farsi	19 October 2025	Amsterdam Marathon	Amsterdam, Netherlands	
30 km (road)	1:54:46+	Khalid Al-Farsi	19 October 2025	Amsterdam Marathon	Amsterdam, Netherlands	
Marathon	2:43:32	Saleh Al-Saidi	21 February 2020		Muscat, Oman	
Marathon	2:43:27	Khalid Al-Farsi	19 October 2025	Amsterdam Marathon	Amsterdam, Netherlands	
110 m hurdles	14.41	Jalal Salem Al-Ghabshi	10 March 2005		Dubai, United Arab Emirates	
400 m hurdles	51.54	Abdullah Said Al-Haidi	20 September 2010	West Asian Championships	Aleppo, Syria	
3000 m steeplechase	9:09.26	Qais Salim Al-Mahrooqi	8 December 2006		Doha, Qatar	
High jump	2.05 m	Zahran Abdul Salem	14 August 1999		Irbid, Jordan	
High jump	2.14 m	Fatak Bait Jaboob	12 August 2022	Islamic Solidarity Games	Konya, Turkey	
High jump	2.15 m	Fatik Yakoob Abdelghafoor	31 March 2023	4th Omani Federation League Meeting	Muscat, Oman	
High jump	2.15 m	Fatik Yakoob Abdelghafoor	20 June 2023	Arab Championships	Marrakech, Morocco	
High jump	2.16 m	Fatik Yakoob Abdelghafoor	4 July 2023	Arab Games	Oran, Algeria	
Pole vault	4.30 m	Yahya Saleh Al-Hashmy	22 May 2001		Muscat, Oman	
Long jump	7.75 m	Ahmad Hadib Bashir	5 August 1994		Tallinn, Estonia	
Long jump	7.75 m NWI	Salim Saleh Al-Yarabi	24 June 2023	Arab Championships	Marrakech, Morocco	
Triple jump	15.53 m (+1.6 m/s)	Salim Salah Al-Yarabi	17 May 2022	GCC Games	Kuwait City, Kuwait	
Triple jump	15.72 m (+0.2 m/s)	Salim Al-Rawahi	9 August 2022	Islamic Solidarity Games	Konya, Turkey	
Triple jump	16.42 m (±0.0 m/s)	Salim Saleh Al-Yarabi	23 June 2023	Arab Championships	Marrakech, Morocco	
Shot put	15.50 m	Khamis Said Al-Qasmi	8 April 2013		Doha, Qatar	
Discus throw	42.26 m	Mahmoud Salim Al-Siyabi	22 May 2001		Muscat, Oman	
Hammer throw	68.39 m	Mubeen Rashid Al-Kindi	5 September 2026	Oman Athletics Grand Prix	Muscat, Oman	
Javelin throw	70.11 m	Khamis Ghabish Al-Quteiti	18 June 2011		Zgorzelec, Poland	
Decathlon	5757 pts	Ahmed Abdalah Al-Muqbali	30 April – 1 May 2009		Qatif, Saudi Arabia	
Decathlon	100m (wind) / Long jump (wind) / Shot put / High jump / 400m / 110m H (wind) / Discus / Pole vault / Javelin / 1500m; 11.50 / 5.96 m / 10.83 m / 1.70 m / 54.66 / 17.33 / 28.29 m / 3.60 m / 54.42 m / 5:01.80					
10 km walk (road)	1:05:00+	Aiman Al-Hashemi	5 March 2022	Race Walking Team Championships	Muscat, Oman	
20 km walk (road)	2:16:58	Aiman Al-Hashemi	5 March 2022	Race Walking Team Championships	Muscat, Oman	
50 km walk (road)						
4 × 100 m relay	39.17	Oman; Rashid Al-Aasmi; Barakat Al-Harthi; Mohamed Obaid Al-Saadi; Khalid Saleh Al-Ghailani	12 July 2023	Asian Championships	Bangkok, Thailand	
4 × 400 m relay	3:05.94	Oman; Ahmed Al-Merjabi; Othman Al-Busaidi; Mohamed Hindi; Ahmed Mubarak Salah	7 June 2015	Asian Championships	Wuhan, China	

=== Women ===
Event	Record	Athlete	Date,	Meet	Place	Ref.
100 m	11.47 (+1.8 m/s)	Mazoon Al-Alawi	16 May 2022	GCC Games	Kuwait City, Kuwait	
200 m	24.97 (−1.5 m/s)	Mazoon Al-Alawi	18 April 2021		Antalya, Turkey	
200 m	24.49 NWI	Azza Sultan Al-Yarubi	16 May 2024	National Athletics Shield Meet	Muscat, Oman	
400 m	1:00.83	Hanaa Al-Qassimi	18 May 2017	Islamic Solidarity Games	Baku, Azerbaijan	
400 m	59.69	Hanaa Al-Qassimi	28 April 2023	Federation Shield Championships	Muscat, Oman	
400 m	58.34	Hanaa Al-Qassimi	26 January 2024	1st National Athletics League Meet	Muscat, Oman	
400 m	59.03	Hanaa Al-Qassimi	30 May 2024		Basra, Iraq	
800 m	2:39.51	Samira Al-Harrasi	6 May 2010		Kuwait City, Kuwait	
800 m	2:32.09	Hanaa Al-Qassimi	3 February 2023	2nd Omani Federation League Meeting	Sohar, Oman	
800 m	2:29.51	Hanaa Al-Qassimi	31 March 2023	4th Omani Federation League Meeting	Muscat, Oman	
800 m	2:25.76	Hanaa Al-Qassimi	14 April 2023	5th Omani Federation League Meeting	Muscat, Oman	
1500 m	6:04.56	Tasnim Nile Al-Riyami	11 March 2017		Doha, Qatar	
1500 m	5:47.8 h	Hanaa Al-Qassimi	10 February 2023	3rd Omani Federation League Meeting	Muscat, Oman	
3000 m	15:08.11	Hanan Jahmani	5 April 2024	National Challenge Championships	Muscat, Oman	
5000 m						
10,000 m						
Half marathon	2:12:47+	Zuwena Al-Rawahi	22 January 2010	Dubai Marathon	Dubai, United Arab Emirates	
Half marathon	1:58:34 (Note: unratifiable due to no official confirmation about the course measurement)	Marwa Al-Rawahi	25 February 2023	Al Seeb Half Marathon	Muscat, Oman	
Half marathon	1:46:11	Nutayla Al-Harthy	11 November 2022	International Al Mouj Marathon	Muscat, Oman	
Marathon	3:57:33	Zuwena Al-Rawahi	27 January 2017		Muscat, Oman	
100 m hurdles	13.87 (+1.6 m/s)	Mazoon Al-Alawi	16 May 2022	GCC Games	Kuwait City, Kuwait	
400 m hurdles	1:06.77	Hanaa Al-Qasimi	10 March 2017		Doha, Qatar	
3000 m steeplechase						
High jump	1.71 m	Aliya Al-Mughairi	1 May 2025	Arab Championships	Oran, Lebanon	
Pole vault	2.70 m	Rasha Mohamed Al-Malki	22 June 2013		Cairo, Egypt	
Long jump	5.45 m	Buthayna Ayed Al-Yacoobi	14 July 2012		Budapest, Hungary	
Triple jump	10.43 m	Buthayna Ayed Al-Yacoobi	11 April 2008		Amman, Jordan	
Triple jump	10.43 m	Khadija Suleiman Al-Manijeh	10 March 2017		Doha, Qatar	
Shot put	11.55 m	Raghad Al-Zubaidi	26 April 2014		Cairo, Egypt	
Discus throw	31.62 m	Raghad Al-Zubaidi	23 October 2013		Amman, Jordan	
Hammer throw	49.36 m	Hana Saeed Al-Touqi	18 May 2022	GCC Games	Kuwait City, Kuwait	
Javelin throw	37.96 m	Ghania Al-Nasser	13 March 2015	4th GCC Women's Games	Muscat, Oman	
Javelin throw	39.40 m	Heba Hammoud Al-Asmi	10 February 2024	Arab Women Sports Tournament	Sharjah, United Arab Emirates	
Javelin throw	40.67 m	Hiba Hammood Al-Asmi	31 May 2024	West Asian Championships	Basra, Iraq	
Heptathlon	3484 pts	Heba Hamood Al-Asimi	14–15 March 2015	4th GCC Women's Games	Muscat, Oman	
Heptathlon	100m H (wind) / High jump / Shot put / 200m (wind) / Long jump (wind) / Javelin / 800m; 17.38 / 1.38 m / 7.04 m / 29.18 / 4.97 m / 33.33 m / 2:49.51					
20 km walk (road)						
50 km walk (road)						
4 × 100 m relay	47.67	Oman	26 April 2015	Arab Championships	Manama, Bahrain	
4 × 400 m relay	4:30.09	Oman; Mazoon Al-Alawi; Shinoona Al-Habsi; Hiba Al-Asmi; Buthaina Al-Yaqoubi	29 September 2013	Islamic Solidarity Games	Palembang, Indonesia	

== Indoor ==
=== Men ===
Event	Record	Athlete	Date	Meet	Place	Ref.
60 m	6.66	Barakat Al-Harthi	19 September 2017	Asian Indoor and Martial Arts Games	Ashgabat, Turkmenistan	
60 m	6.58	Ali Anwar Al-Balushi	20 January 2024	Indoor Oliympic Trial	Istanbul, Turkey	
60 m	6.56	Ali Anwar Al-Balushi	18 February 2024	Asian Championships	Tehran, Iran	
60 m	6.50	Ali Anwar Al-Balushi	18 February 2024	Asian Championships	Tehran, Iran	
200 m	21.97	Hamoud Abdallah Al-Dalhami	6 March 2004	World Championships	Budapest, Hungary	
400 m	47.90	Mohamed Salim Al-Rawahi	11 February 2006	Asian Championships	Pattaya, Thailand	
800 m	1:53.73	Husain Mohsin Al-Farsi	18 February 2024	Asian Championships	Tehran, Iran	
800 m	1:52.99	Husain Mohsin Al-Farsi	19 February 2024	Asian Championships	Tehran, Iran	
800 m	1:48.47	Husain Mohsin Al-Farsi	1 March 2024	World Championships	Glasgow, United Kingdom	
1500 m	3:55.71	Qais Salim Al-Mahroqi	26 February 2010	Asian Championships	Tehran, Iran	
3000 m	8:39.00	Qais Salim Al-Mahroqi	24 February 2010	Asian Championships	Tehran, Iran	
60 m hurdles	8.20	Gharib Al-Khaldi	1 November 2009	Asian Games	Hanoi, Vietnam	
High jump						
Pole vault						
Long jump	7.51 m	Ahmed Al-Moamari	10 March 1995	World Championships	Barcelona, Spain	
Triple jump						
Shot put						
Heptathlon	4211 pts	Yahya Saleh Al-Hashmy	8–9 February 2001		Rasht, Iran	
Heptathlon	60m / Long jump / Shot put / High jump / 60m H / Pole vault / 1000m					
5000 m walk						
4 × 400 m relay	3:13.49	Oman; Obaid Al-Quraini; Ahmed Al-Marjabi; Othman Al-Busaidi; Ahmed Mubarak Salah	16 February 2014	Asian Championships	Hangzhou, China	

=== Women ===
Event	Record	Athlete	Date	Meet	Place	Ref.
60 m	7.78	Mazoon Al-Alawi	2 March 2018	World Championships	Birmingham, United Kingdom	
200 m						
400 m	1:02.43	Hena Jouma Al-Qasimi	19 February 2016	Asian Championships	Doha, Qatar	
800 m						
1500 m						
3000 m						
60 m hurdles	9.03	Mazoon Al-Alawi	20 February 2016	Asian Championships	Doha, Qatar	
High jump						
Pole vault						
Long jump	4.69 m	Shanoona Salah Al-Habsi	12 February 2015		Tehran, Iran	
Triple jump						
Shot put	10.24 m	Hamida Al-Habshi	25 September 2005	Women's Islamic Games	Tehran, Iran	
Pentathlon						
Pentathlon	60m H / High jump / Shot put / Long jump / 800m					
3000 m walk						
4 × 400 m relay	4:57.90	Oman	27 September 2005	Women's Islamic Games	Tehran, Iran	
