= Tigest Getent =

Bahraini steeplechase runner (born 1997)

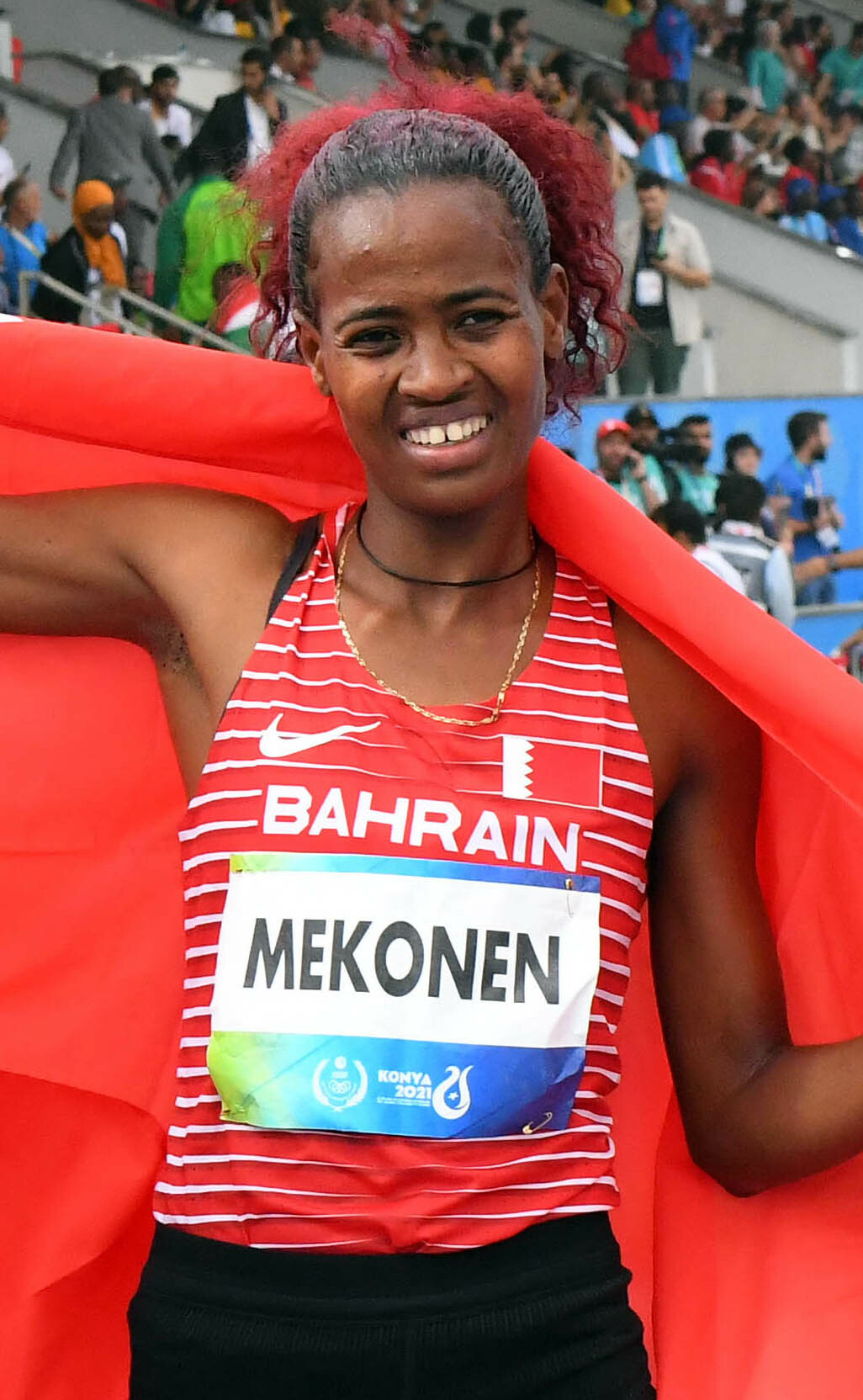
- Tigest Getent Mekonen at the 2021 Islamic Solidarity Games
Medal record
Women's athletics
Representing Bahrain
Asian Championships
Bronze medal – third place	2019 Doha	3000 m steeplechase
Military World Games
Bronze medal – third place	2015 Mungyeong	3000 m steeplechase
Islamic Solidarity Games
Silver medal – second place	2021 Konya	3000 m steeplechase
Bronze medal – third place	2017 Baku	3000 m steeplechase
GCC Games
Gold medal – first place	2022 Kuwait City	800 m
Silver medal – second place	2022 Kuwait City	1500 m
Arab Championships
Silver medal – second place	2015 Isa Town	3000 m steeplechase
West Asian Championships
Silver medal – second place	2023 Doha	800 m
Silver medal – second place	2023 Doha	1500 m

Tigest Getent Mekonin, sometimes Tigist or Mekonen (born July 7, 1997, in Dembecha, Ethiopia) is a Bahraini steeplechase runner. She competed at the 2016 Summer Olympics in the women's 3000 metres steeplechase race; her time of 9:49.92 in the heats did not qualify her for the final.

In 2017, she competed in the women's 3000 metres steeplechase event at the 2017 World Championships in Athletics held in London, United Kingdom. She did not advance to compete in the final.
