= Ali Anwar Al-Balushi =

Omani sprinter

Personal information
- Full name: Ali Anwar Ali Al-Balushi
- Born: 9 February 2002 (age 24) Oman

Sport
- Sport: Athletics
- Events: 100 metres, 200 metres
Medal record
Men's athletics
Representing Oman
Asian Games
Silver medal – second place	2026 Aichi–Nagoya	100 m
Asian Indoor Championships
Gold medal – first place	2024 Tehran	60 m
Islamic Solidarity Games
Gold medal – first place	2025 Riyadh	100 m

Ali Anwar Ali Al-Balushi (born 9 February 2002) is an Omani sprinter. He won the gold medal at the 2024 Asian Indoor Championships in Tehran.

== International competitions ==
Year	Competition	Venue	Position	Event	Notes
Representing Oman
2019	Asian Youth Championships	Hong Kong	4th	100 m	10.69
2019	Asian Youth Championships	Hong Kong	3rd	200 m	21.93
2019	Arab U18 Championships	Radès, Tunisia	3rd	200 m	21.71
2021	Arab Championships	Radès, Tunisia	2nd	4 × 100 m relay	39.95
2021	World U20 Championships	Nairobi, Kenya	4th	100 m	10.39
2022	World Indoor Championships	Belgrade, Serbia	32nd (h)	60 m	6.71
2022	GCC Games	Kuwait City, Kuwait	5th	100 m	10.37
2022	GCC Games	Kuwait City, Kuwait	2nd	4 × 100 m relay	39.72
2022	Islamic Solidarity Games	Konya, Turkey	14th (sf)	100 m	10.37
2022	Islamic Solidarity Games	Konya, Turkey	3rd	4 × 100 m relay	39.21
2023	Asian Indoor Championships	Astana, Kazakhstan	5th	60 m	6.69
2023	West Asian Championships	Doha, Qatar	8th (h)	100 m	10.50
2023	West Asian Championships	Doha, Qatar	1st	4 × 100 m relay	39.43
2023	Arab U23 Championships	Radès, Tunisia	2nd	100 m	10.48
2023	Arab U23 Championships	Radès, Tunisia	2nd	200 m	21.35
2023	Arab Championships	Marrakesh, Morocco	10th (h)	100 m	10.67
2023	Arab Games	Oran, Algeria	4th	100 m	10.59
2023	Arab Games	Oran, Algeria	4th	4 × 100 m relay	39.70
2023	Asian Championships	Bangkok, Thailand	25th (h)	100 m	10.61^{1}
2023	Asian Games	Hangzhou, China	14th (sf)	100 m	10.33
2023	Asian Games	Hangzhou, China	–	4 × 100 m relay	DQ
2024	Asian Indoor Championships	Tehran, Iran	1st	60 m	6.52
2024	West Asian Championships	Basra, Iraq	2nd (h)	100 m	10.28^{2}
2024	West Asian Championships	Basra, Iraq	1st	4 × 100 m relay	39.78
2024	Olympic Games	Paris, France	43rd (h)	100 m	10.26
2025	World Indoor Championships	Nanjing, China	10th (sf)	60 m	6.61
2025	Arab Championships	Oran, Algeria	2nd	100 m	10.27
2025	Arab Championships	Oran, Algeria	2nd	200 m	20.67
2025	Asian Championships	Gumi, South Korea	6th	100 m	10.33
2025	Asian Championships	Gumi, South Korea	11th (sf)	200 m	21.30
2025	World Championships	Tokyo, Japan	38th (h)	100 m	10.25
2025	Islamic Solidarity Games	Riyadh, Saudi Arabia	1st	100 m	10.30
2025	Islamic Solidarity Games	Riyadh, Saudi Arabia	4th	200 m	20.85
2025	Islamic Solidarity Games	Riyadh, Saudi Arabia	2nd	4 × 100 m relay	39.21
2026	World Indoor Championships	Toruń, Poland	16th (sf)	60 m	6.61
2026	GCC Games	Doha, Qatar	1st	100 m	10.13
2026	GCC Games	Doha, Qatar	1st	200 m	20.48 (w)
2026	GCC Games	Doha, Qatar	1st	4 × 100 m relay	40.08

^{1}Did not finish in the semifinal
^{2}Did not finish in the final

== Personal bests ==
Outdoor

- 100 metres – 10.14 (-1.1 m/s, Nembro 2024)
- 200 metres – 20.68 (+1.2 m/s, Ismailia 2024)

Indoor

- 60 metres – 6.50 (Tehran 2024) NR
