= Moaaz Mohamed Ibrahim =

Qatari discus thrower

Personal information
- Nationality: Qatari
- Born: 8 February 1999 (age 27)

Sport
- Event: Discus throw
Medal record
Men's athletics
Representing Qatar
World U20 Championships
| Gold medal – first place | 2016 Bydgoszcz | Discus throw |
Arab Championships
| Silver medal – second place | 2023 Marrakesh | Discus throw |
| Bronze medal – third place | 2025 Oran | Discus throw |
West Asian Championships
| Gold medal – first place | 2023 Doha | Discus throw |
| Silver medal – second place | 2024 Basra | Discus throw |
Islamic Solidarity Games
| Silver medal – second place | 2021 Konya | Discus throw |
GCC Games
| Silver medal – second place | 2022 Kuwait City | Discus throw |
Asian Junior Championships
| Gold medal – first place | 2016 Ho Chi Minh City | Discus throw |
| Silver medal – second place | 2018 Gifu | Discus throw |

Moaaz Mohamed Ibrahim (born February 8, 1999) is a Qatari athlete, specializing in the discus throw. He won the gold medal at 2016 IAAF World U20 Championships.

== Personal bests ==
| Event | Notes | Venue | Date |
|---|---|---|---|
| discus throw | 63,63 m | 2016 IAAF World U20 Championships | 24 July 2016 |
