= Amal Al-Roumi =

Kuwaiti middle-distance runner (born 1992)

Personal information
- Born: 22 August 1992 (age 33)

Sport
- Country: Kuwait
- Sport: Athletics
- Event: 800 metres
Medal record
Women's athletics
Representing Kuwait
GCC Women's Games
Bronze medal – third place	2019 Kuwait City	1500 m
GCC Games
Silver medal – second place	2022 Kuwait City	800 m
Bronze medal – third place	2022 Kuwait City	1500 m
West Asian Athletics Championships
Bronze medal – third place	2023 Doha	800 m
Bronze medal – third place	2024 Basra	800 m
Silver medal – second place	2024 Basra	1500 m

Amal Al-Roumi (Arabic: أمل الرومي; born 22 August 1992) is a Kuwaiti middle-distance runner. She was the first Kuwaiti runner to compete in the women's 800 metres at the Olympics, which she did at the 2024 Olympics. Al-Roumi won medals at the GCC Women's Games, GCC Games, and West Asian Games throughout her career, setting Kuwaiti national records in the 1500 metres, 3000 metres, and 5000 metres.

== Career ==
Al-Roumi began running in 2016 and joined the Kuwait national team in 2018. Al-Roumi thought she had a chance of a medal at the 2018 Asian Indoor Championships, but she suffered from a norovirus infection and did not start the 800 m or 1500 m.

She won her first medal at the 2019 GCC Women's Games in Kuwait City, placing 3rd in the 1500 m in 4:51.95. At the 2022 GCC Games featuring both men and women, Al-Roumi won another bronze 1500 m medal and a silver medal in the 800 m. She was 11th in the 1500 m final of the Islamic Solidarity Games held that year.

In 2023, Al-Roumi was 5th and 7th in the 800 m and 1500 m at the 2023 Asian Indoor Championships respectively. She won a bronze medal in the 800 m at the 2023 West Asian Athletics Championships, also placing 4th in the 1500 m. Ending her season at the Asian Games, Al-Roumi placed 13th in the 1500 m and did not advance to the finals in the 800 m.

Al-Roumi nearly won her first Asian medal at the 2024 Asian Indoor Championships, placing 4th in the 800 m. Outdoors, she won 800 m bronze and 1500 m silver at the 2024 West Asian Athletics Championships. Before the Olympics, Al-Roumi took part in an international training camp in Belgium, where she also competed in the Flanders Cup.

Al-Roumi was seeded in the first quarter-final 800 m heat at the Olympics. She ran 2:11.35 to finish 8th and did not advance. In the repechage round, she ran 2:12.13 to place 8th again and did not advance to the semi-finals. Al-Roumi criticized inadequate air conditioning and poor quality food at the Games.

At the 2025 Asian Athletics Championships, Al-Roumi was 13th in the 1500 m and did not make the 800 m finals.

== Personal life ==
Al-Roumi described herself as having mild ADHD. In Kuwait, she felt that her potential was underestimated because of her gender. Men would refuse to train with her due to stereotypes about women in Kuwait being spoiled or incapable.
