= 2012 West Asian Athletics Championships =

2nd West Asian Athletics Championships
- Dates: 12–15 December
- Host city: Dubai, United Arab Emirates
- Events: 45

The 2012 West Asian Athletics Championships was the second edition of the international athletics competition organised by the West Asian Athletics Association that took place from 12 to 15 December 2012 in Dubai, United Arab Emirates.

== Medal summary ==
=== Men ===
Event	Gold		Silver		Bronze	
100 metres (wind: -0.9 m/s)	Barakat Al-Harthi (OMA)	10.39	Reza Ghasemi (IRI)	10.43	Hussain Ghulom Al-Blooshi (UAE)	10.50
200 metres (wind: 0.0 m/s)	Reza Ghasemi (IRI)	21.04	Barakat Al-Harthi (OMA)	21.28	Mohamed Hassan Juma (IRQ)	21.45
400 metres	Mayouf Hassan Ahmed (UAE)	46.99	Saud Abdelkerim (UAE)	47.20	Othman Al-Busaidi (OMA)	47.79
800 metres	Adnan Taess Askar (IRQ)	1:51.40	Ebrahim Al-Zofairi (KUW)	1:52.06	Mostafa Ebrahimi (IRI)	1:53.26
1500 metres	Omar Al-Rasheedi (KUW)	3:56.04	Hussein Keyhani (IRI)	3:56.65		
5000 metres	Qais Salim Al-Mahrooqi (OMA)	16:05.57				
10,000 metres	Methkal Marouf Abu Drais (JOR)	33:18.45				
Half marathon	Methkal Marouf Abu Drais (JOR)	1:07:38	Saif Hamad Al-Rashidi (UAE)	1:10:55	? (UAE)	1:11:48
110 metres hurdles (wind: -0.1 m/s)	Abdelaziz Al-Mandeel (KUW)	13.68 CR	Milad Sayyar (IRI)	14.54	Yaqoub Mohamed Al-Youha (KUW)	14.69
400 metres hurdles	Jamal Abdelnasir Aboubaker (QAT)	51.87	Saud Abdelkerim (UAE)	51.88	Jassim Waleed Al-Mas (KUW)	51.94
3000 metres steeplechase	Hussein Keyhani (IRI)	8:55.59	Ahmad Foroud (IRI)	8:55.61	Saeed Abbas Al-Thamali (KSA)	9:10.99
4 × 100 metres relay	Iran ? Hassan Taftian ? Reza Ghasemi	40.26	Oman ? Yahya Al-Nofali ? Barakat Al-Harthi	40.31	Kuwait ? ? Abdelaziz Al-Mandeel; Hamoud Al-Saad	40.61
4 × 400 metres relay	United Arab Emirates ? Mayouf Hassan Ahmed; Omar Juma Al-Salfa; Saud Abdelkerim	3:10.80	Oman ? ? ? Othman Al-Busaidi	3:11.07	Iraq; Adnan Taess Askar ? ? ?	3:13.79
20 kilometres walk	Mabrook Saleh Nasser Mohamed (QAT)	1:32:02	Ebrahim Rahimian (IRI)	1:32:33	Hussein Mohamed Al-Khairi (QAT)	1:49:24
High jump	Mutaz Essa Barshim (QAT)	2.32 m CR	Keivan Ghanbarzadeh (IRI)	2.20 m	Majed Eldin Ghazal (SYR)	2.15 m
Pole vault	Fahid Bader Al-Mershad (KUW)	4.90 m	Mohsen Rabbani (IRI)	4.80 m	Ali Makki Al-Sabagha (KUW)	4.80 m
Long jump	Ali Reza Habibi (IRI)	7.38 m	Sobhan Taherkhani (IRI)	7.35 m		
Triple jump	Mohamed Abbas Darwish (UAE)	16.20 m	Abdullah Mohammed Al-Youha (KUW)	15.46 m	Mohamed Youssef Al-Sahabi (BHR)	15.33 m
Shot put	Ahmed Hassan Gholoum (KUW)	18.97 m	Meshari Saad Suroor (KUW)	18.43 m	Ali Reza Mehr-Safouti (IRI)	18.23 m
Discus throw	Mohammad Samimi (IRI)	62.36 m	Ahmed Mohamed Dheeb (QAT)	62.18 m	Mahmoud Samimi (IRI)	59.00 m
Hammer throw	Ali Mohammed Al-Zankawi (KUW)	76.14 m	Kaveh Mousavi (IRI)	70.43 m	Masoud Moghaddam (IRI)	64.44 m
Javelin throw	Ammar Mekki Ali (IRQ)	69.31 m	Ayoub Arakhi (IRI)	67.15 m	Omid Taji (IRI)	66.57 m
Decathlon	Abdoljalil Tomaj (IRI)	6611 pts	Mohammed Molla Khalaf (SYR)	6128 pts	Saed Kolivand (IRI)	5975 pts

=== Women ===
Event	Gold		Silver		Bronze	
100 metres (wind: +0.3 m/s)	Dana Abdul Razak Hussein (IRQ)	11.91	Farzaneh Fasihi (IRI)	12.06	Hajar Saad Al-Khaldi (BHR)	12.32
200 metres (wind: NWI)	Gretta Taslakian (LBN)	24.16	Dana Abdul Razak Hussein (IRQ)	24.56	Shinoona Al-Habsi (OMA)	25.45 NR
400 metres	Gretta Taslakian (LBN)	54.13				
800 metres	Bethlem Desalegn (UAE)	2:14.30				
1500 metres	Bethlem Desalegn (UAE)	4:32.92	Fatima Ghassan Rayya (SYR)	4:44.74	Khazaal Inam Al-Sudani (IRQ)	4:47.69
5000 metres	Alia Saeed Mohamed (UAE)	16:20.62	Maria Pia Nehme (LBN)	18:18.72		
10,000 metres	Alia Saeed Mohamed (UAE)	34:23.72	Maria Pia Nehme (LBN)	39:38.36		
100 metres hurdles (wind: -0.4 m/s)	Buthaina Al-Yaqoobi (OMA)	15.21	Elnaz Kompanizare (IRI)	15.67	Only two competitors	
400 metres hurdles	Mahlaghaa Khanbashi (IRI)	65.82	Atefe Layeghi (IRI)	66.77	Ayda Saeed Mousa Al-Baloushi (UAE)	82.33
3000 metres steeplechase	Fatima Ghassan Rayya (SYR)	11:45.64 NR	Hoda Ahmed Al-Awadi (LBN)	12:48.67		
4 × 100 metres relay	Lebanon; Gretta Taslakian; Maha Al-Mohallem; Christel Saneh; Christelle Rahme	49.01	Iraq ? ? ? Dana Abdul Razak Hussein	49.67	Oman ? ? ? Shinoona Al-Habsi	52.38
4 × 400 metres relay	Iran ? ? ? Mahlaghaa Khanbashi	4:05.57	Lebanon; Sara Awaly; Lory Tashkian; Saria Trabulsi; Aziza Sbaity	4:07.28	United Arab Emirates; Bethlem Desalegn ? ? ?	4:19.04 NR
10 kilometres walk	Rania Osman (SYR)	1:01:30	Sandy Karam (LBN)	1:07:26 NR		
High jump	Sepideh Tavakkoli (IRI)	1.70 m	Mahsa Kargar (IRI)	1.70 m	Maryam Mohamed Al-Ansari (BHR)	1.65 m
Pole vault	Diana Al-Khasawnah (JOR)	3.00 m	Rehane Sheeha (SYR)	3.00 m	Rasda Al-Lamki (OMA)	2.70 m NR
Long jump	Jawaher Zamani (IRI)	5.46 m	Christel Saneh (LBN)	5.45 m	Fatemeh Barzenooni (IRI)	5.42 m
Triple jump	Jawaher Zamani (IRI)	12.03 m	Samaneh Koohkan (IRI)	11.38 m	Christel Saneh (LBN)	11.22 m
Shot put	Leila Rajabi (IRI)	16.96 m	Hiba Omar (SYR)	12.64 m	Fatemeh Khayati (IRI)	12.45 m
Discus throw	Leila Rajabi (IRI)	41.21 m	Fatemeh Khayati (IRI)	40.36 m	Hiba Omar (SYR)	40.02 m
Hammer throw	Parinaz Ebrahimi (IRI)	44.64 m				
Javelin throw	Amine Amiri (IRI)	42.97 m CR	Adaoua Arour (SYR)	41.38 m	Sahar Ziaeisisakht (IRI)	40.97 m
Heptathlon	Sepideh Tavakkoli (IRI)	4802 pts CR	Nour Al-Sous (SYR)	4221 pts	Muhra Jaseem Abdullah (UAE)	2613 pts NR

== Medal table ==
Rank	Nation	Gold	Silver	Bronze	Total
1	Iran (IRI)	16	16	9	41
2	United Arab Emirates (UAE)	7	3	5	15
3	Kuwait (KUW)	5	3	4	12
4	Lebanon (LIB)	3	6	1	10
5	Oman (OMA)	3	3	4	10
6	Iraq (IRQ)	3	2	3	8
7	Qatar (QAT)	3	1	1	5
8	Jordan (JOR)	3	0	0	3
9	Syria	2	6	2	10
10	Bahrain (BHR)	0	0	3	3
Totals (10 entries)		45	40	32	117
