= Ogunode =

Ògúnòde
- Gender: Male
- Language: Yoruba

Origin
- Origin: Nigerian
- Meaning: The Ògún (shrine) outside of the house.
- Region of origin: South West, Nigeria

Ògúnòde audio is a Nigerian surname. It is a male name and of Yoruba origin, which means "The Ògún (shrine) outside of the house.".Ògún is the Yorùbá god of iron. The name Ògúnòde is a unique and culturally significant name and primarily used among the families of Ògún devotees.

== Notable individuals with the name ==
- Femi Ogunode (born 1991), Nigerian-Qatari sprinter
- Tosin Ogunode (born 1994), Nigerian-Qatari sprinter, brother of Femi
