= Track and field at the 2015 Military World Games – Women's 3000 metres steeplechase =

The women's 3000 metres steeplechase event at the 2015 Military World Games was held on 4 October at the KAFAC Sports Complex.

== Records ==
Prior to this competition, the existing world and CISM record were as follows:

World Record	Gulnara Samitova-Galkina (RUS)	8:58.81	Beijing, China	17 August 2008
CISM World Record	Mercy Njoroge (KEN)	9:36.92	Rio de Janeiro, Brazil	19 July 2011

== Schedule ==
Date	Time	Round
4 October 2015	17:50	Final

== Medalists ==
Gold	Silver	Bronze
Ruth Jebet; Bahrain	Agnes Jesang; Kenya	Tigest Getent Mekonen; Bahrain

== Results ==
=== Final ===
Rank	Name	Nationality	Time	Notes
1st place, gold medalist(s)	Ruth Jebet	Bahrain	9:30.24	CR
2nd place, silver medalist(s)	Agnes Jesang	Kenya	9:40.69	
3rd place, bronze medalist(s)	Tigest Getent Mekonen	Bahrain	9:41.46	
4	Mariya Shatalova	Ukraine	9:51.26	
5	Marion Jepkonga Kibor	Kenya	9:51.66	
6	Susan Tanui	United States	10:42.69	
7	Katherin Cardozo	Uruguay	11:56.15	
	Velasquez Caiza Katherine Lorena	Ecuador	DNF	
