= Abdirahman Saeed Hassan =

Qatari athlete (born 1997)

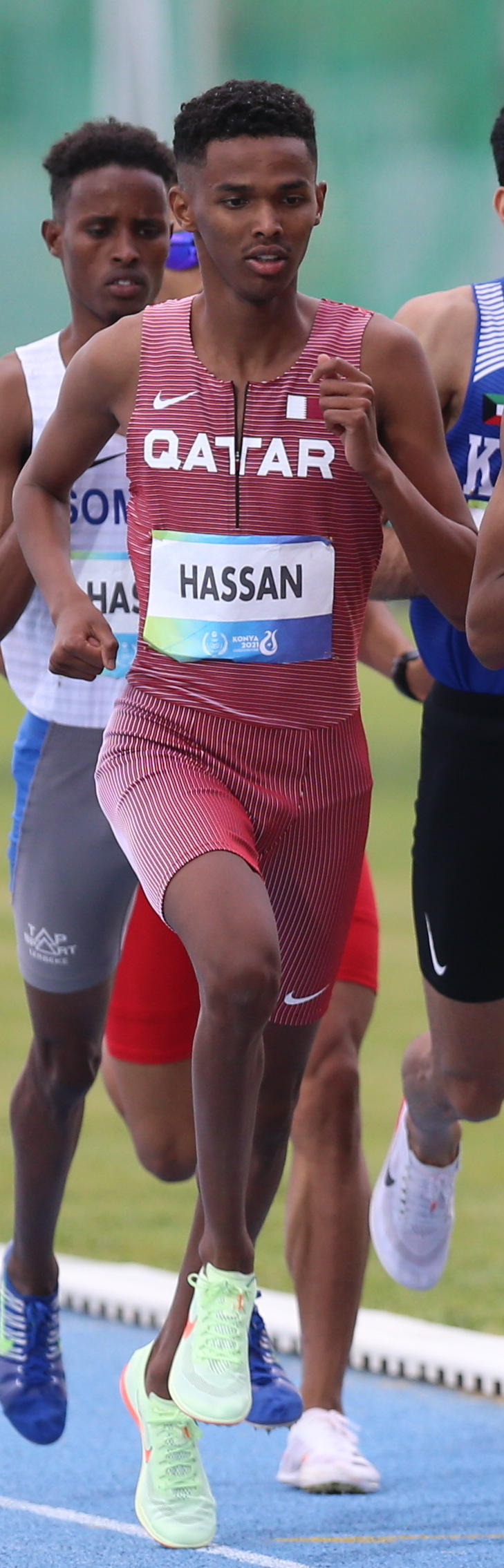
- Abdirahman Saeed Hassan in 2022

Personal information
- Born: 13 April 1997 (age 29)

Sport
- Sport: Athletics
- Events: 800 metres; 1500 metres
Medal record
Men's athletics
Representing Qatar
Islamic Solidarity Games
Silver medal – second place	2021 Konya	1500 m
Asian Indoor Championships
Silver medal – second place	2023 Astana	800 m
Silver medal – second place	2024 Tehran	1500 m
West Asian Championships
Gold medal – first place	2023 Doha	1500 m
GCC Games
Gold medal – first place	2022 Kuwait City	800 m

Abdirahman Saeed Hassan (born April 13, 1997) is a Qatari athlete who specializes in the 800m and 1500m.

Abdirahman Saeed Hassan gained his first experience in international championships at the 2019 Asian Championships in Doha, where he finished fourth over 800 meters in 1:47.71 minutes. In the 1500m, he also qualified for and ran in the 2019 IAAF World Athletics Championships in Doha.

In May 2021, Hassan met the qualifying standard and secured a spot at the delayed 2020 Tokyo Olympic Games in the men's 1,500m event with a personal best in 3:34.24 for a second-place finish at the Enrique López Cuenca Stadium in Nerja, Málaga. He competed at the Olympics however did not finish his race.

== Personal bests ==
Outdoor

- 800 metres – 1:45.33 (Marseille 2021)
- 1500 metres – 3:34.24 (Nerja 2021)

Indoor

- 1500 metres – 3:44.85 (Luxembourg 2020)
