= Hamdi Ali =

Chadian and Qatari high jumper

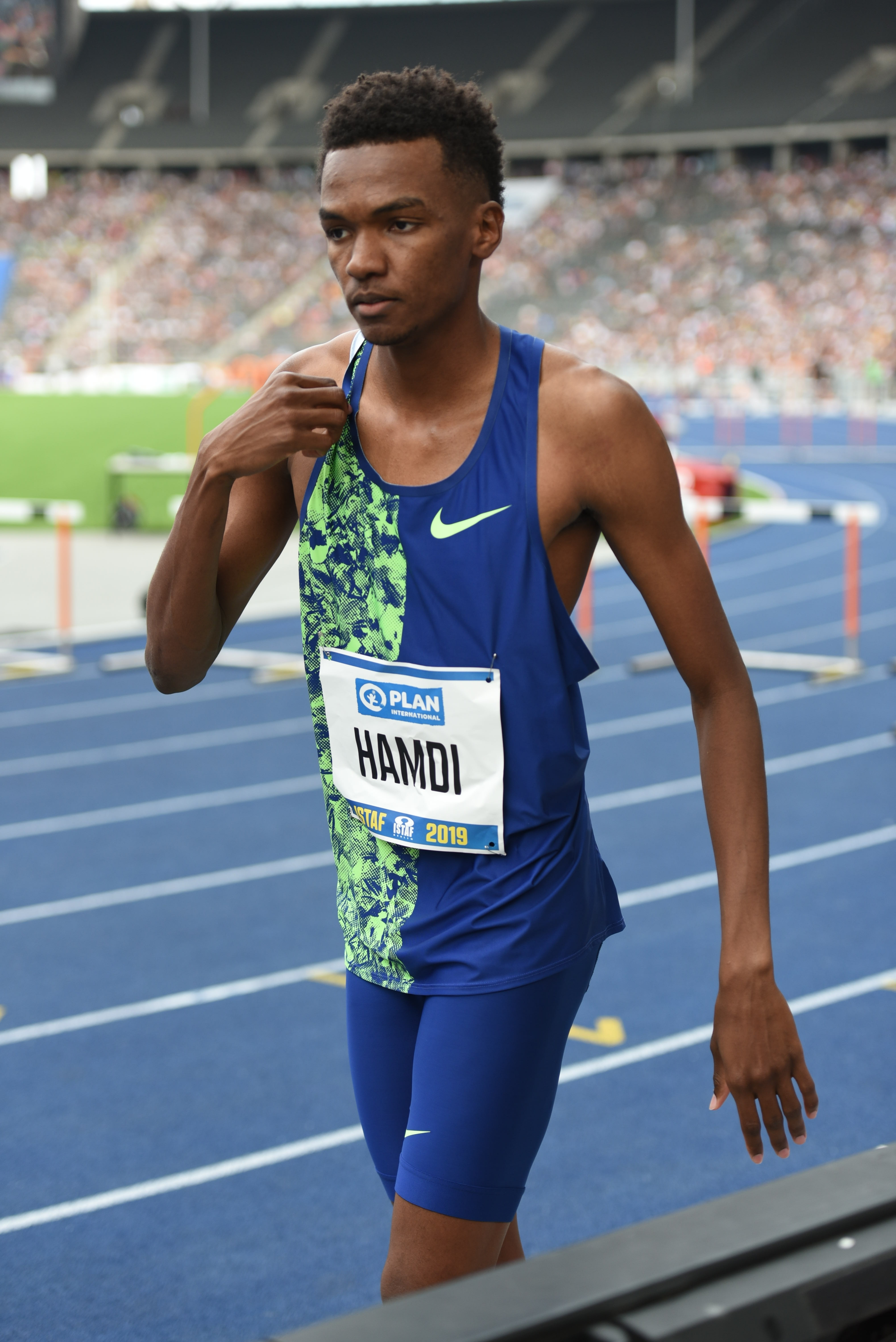
- Ali at the 2019 ISTAF Berlin meeting

Personal information
- Full name: Hamdi Ali; Hamdi Alamin; Ali Hamdi; Hamdi Alamine; Hamdi Ali; Hamdi Ali; Tariq Hamdi Al Amin; Hamdi Ali; Hamdi Ali
- Nationality: Chadian (until 2015); Qatari (since Mar 2015)
- Born: 15 April 1997 (age 29) Saudi Arabia
- Home town: Doha, Qatar

Sport
- Sport: Athletics
- Event: High jump
- College team: West Texas A&M Buffaloes
- Coached by: Stanley Szczyrba; Pavel Szczyrba

Achievements and titles
- Personal bests: HJ: 2.27m (2018); HJ (indoor): 2.21m (2023)
Medal record
Men's athletics
Representing Qatar
World U20 Championships
Bronze medal – third place	2016 Bydgoszcz	High jump
Asian Indoor Championships
Bronze medal – third place	2018 Tehran	High jump
Islamic Solidarity Games
Silver medal – second place	2017 Baku	High jump
Gold medal – first place	2021 Konya	High jump
Gulf Cooperation Council Games
Gold medal – first place	2022 Kuwait City	High jump
Arab Games
Silver medal – second place	2023 Oran	High jump
Arab Championships
Bronze medal – third place	2023 Marrakesh	High jump

Hamdi Ali (full name Hamdi Mahamat Alamine Saleh; born 15 April 1997) is a Qatari high jumper. He was the winner of the 2021 Islamic Solidarity Games in the men's high jump, and he was a bronze medalist at the 2016 World Junior Championships.

== Biography ==
In 2015, with a 2.20 m high jump best at the age of 18, Ali left Saudi Arabia to train in Doha, Qatar with Mutaz Essa Barshim. Ali considers Barshim, who he has known since 2011, to be his mentor. Ali takes inspiration from U.S. rapper Tupac Shakur.

Ali competed in a number of regional international championships starting in 2016, when he won the bronze medal at the IAAF World U20 Championships. In 2017, Ali won the Eberstadt Meeting title in the high jump.

In 2021, Ali won his first international gold medal at the Islamic Solidarity Games. The next year, he won his second international championship, this time sharing the title with Olympic gold medalist Mutaz Essa Barshim at the 2022 Gulf Cooperation Council Games.

In 2022, Ali joined the West Texas A&M Buffaloes track and field team (an NCAA Division II school). At West Texas A&M, Ali broke the school record in the high jump, setting a personal indoor best of 2.21 metres.

== Statistics ==
=== Personal bests ===
Event	Mark	Competition	Venue	Date
High jump	2.27 m	Folksam Grand Prix	Karlstad, Sweden	25 July 2018
High jump (indoor)	2.21 m A	New Mexico Collegiate Classic	Albuquerque, New Mexico	3 February 2023
