= Ammar Ibrahim =

Sudanese-Qatari sprinter

Personal information
- Full name: Ammar Ismail Yahia Ibrahim; Ammar Ismail Yahya Ibrahim; Ammar Ismail Yahya
- Nationality: Qatar
- Born: 18 September 1996 (age 29)

Sport
- Sport: Athletics
- Events: 400 metres 300 metres

Achievements and titles
- National finals: 2020 Turkish Champs; • 400m, 3rd (bronze)
- Personal bests: 300m: 32.55A (2021); 400m: 44.66 (2024)
Medal record
Men's athletics
Representing Qatar
Asian Championships
Gold medal – first place	2025 Gumi	400 m
Asian Games
Silver medal – second place	2022 Hangzhou	4 × 400 m relay
GCC Games
Gold medal – first place	2022 Kuwait City	400 m
Bronze medal – third place	2022 Kuwait City	4 × 400 m relay
Asian Indoor Championships
Gold medal – first place	2023 Astana	400 m
Silver medal – second place	2023 Astana	4 × 400 m relay
West Asian Championships
Gold medal – first place	2023 Doha	400 m
Gold medal – first place	2023 Doha	4 × 400 m relay
- Updated on 10 December 2023

Ammar Ismail Yahia Ibrahim (Arabic: عمار اسماعيل يحيى ابراهيم, born 18 September 1996) is a Qatari sprinter. He is the 2022 GCC Games, 2023 West Asian Athletics Championships, and 2023 Asian Indoor Athletics Championships gold medalist in the 400 metres.

== Biography ==
Ibrahim's first international competition was at the 2020 Turkish Athletics Championships, where he placed third in the 400 m but was not eligible for awards as a foreign national. The following year, Ibrahim was 7th at the 2021 Doha Diamond League in the 400 m, scoring 2 points in that year's Diamond League season.

On 9 February 2022, Ibrahim formally transferred eligibility from Sudan to Qatar. Ibrahim would go on to win two international medals that year representing Qatar at the GCC Games (winning the 400 m and 4 × 400 m). His GCC Games winning time of 45.76 would stand as a personal best.

Ibrahim began the 2023 season by winning the Asian Indoor Championships in the 400 m, and taking silver in the 4 × 400 m. He edged out Mikhail Litvin by just 0.14 seconds to take the 400 m title, his first continental gold. At the 2023 West Asian Athletics Championships in his home country, Ibrahim swept the 400 and 4 × 400 events, winning both in times of 46.23 seconds and a championship record of 3:05.19 seconds respectively. Ibrahim then competed at the 2022 Asian Games (delayed to 2023 due to the COVID-19 pandemic), taking silver in the 4 × 400 relay by virtue of running in the heats.

== Statistics ==
=== Personal bests ===
Event	Mark	Place	Competition	Venue	Date
300 metres	32.55 A	1st place, gold medalist(s)	ACNW Open Meeting	Potchefstroom, South Africa	16 February 2021
400 metres	45.76	1st place, gold medalist(s)	Athletics at the GCC Games	Kuwait City, Kuwait	16 May 2022
