= 2023 Arab Athletics Championships =

23nd Arab Athletics Championships
- Dates: 20–24 June 2023
- Host city: Marrakesh, Morocco
- Venue: Marrakesh Stadium
- Events: 23
- Participation: ~250 athletes from 16 nations

The 2023 Arab Athletics Championships was the twenty third edition of the international athletics competition between Arab countries that took place from 20 to 24 June 2023 at Marrakesh Stadium in Marrakesh. Around 250 athletes from 16 nations attended the event.

== Medal summary ==
=== Men ===
Event	Gold		Silver		Bronze	
100 metres (wind: NWI)	Femi Ogunode (QAT)	10.19	Abdullah Abkar Mohammed (KSA)	10.29	Ali Ashraf Al-Ashmawi (EGY)	10.33
200 metres (wind: -0.1 m/s)	Femi Ogunode (QAT)	20.52	Mohamed Obaid Al-Saadi (OMA)	20.62 NR	Fahhad Mohammed Al-Subaie (KSA)	20.71
400 metres	Ashraf Hussein Osman (QAT)	45.01	Youssef Masrahi (KSA)	45.32	Mazen Al-Yasen (KSA)	45.40
800 metres	Abdelati El Guesse (MAR)	1:46.44	Mostafa Smaili (MAR)	1:46.69	Abdullah Al-Yaari (YEM)	1:48.45
1500 metres	Abdelatif Sadiki (MAR)	3:46.84	Hicham Akankam (MAR)	3:46.84	Ali Hassan Idouw (SOM)	3:46.84
5000 metres	Mohamed Ismail Ibrahim (DJI)	14:27.97	Hussein Sougueh Aden (DJI)	14:29.28	Hafid Rizqy (MAR)	14:31.55
10.000 metres	Hicham Ouladha (MAR)	30:23.78	Abdi Waiss Mouhyadin (DJI)	30:26.04	Tariq Ahmed Al-Amri (KSA)	30:30.12
Half marathon	Abdi Waiss Mouhyadin (DJI)	1:06:33	Mouhcine Outalha (MAR)	1:06:34	Hassan Torris (MAR)	1:06:44
110 metres hurdles (wind NWI)	Yaqoub Mohamed Al-Youha (KUW)	13.58	Mohamed Koussi (MAR)	13.74	Yousuf Badawy Sayed (EGY)	13.77
400 metres hurdles	Bassem Hemeida (QAT)	48.79 CR	Saad Hinti (MAR)	49.66	Mehdi El Dimokrati (MAR)	49.91
3000 metres steeplechase	Mohammed Mesaaed (MAR)	8:33.40	Salaheddine Ben Yazide (MAR)	8:35.14	Salem Mohamed Attiaallah (EGY)	8:35.82
4 × 100 metres relay	Saudi Arabia; Abdullah Abkar Mohammed; Fahhad Mohammed Al-Subaie; Mahmoud Hafiz Ibrahim; Mohammed Dawood Abdullah	39.08	Qatar; Unknown; Unknown; Tosin Ogunode; Femi Ogunode	40.18	Morocco; Unknown; Unknown; Amine Ait El-Hadj; Chakir Machmour	40.38
4 × 400 metres relay	Morocco; Unknown; Unknown; Aymane El Haddaoui; Hamza Dair	3:06.56	Iraq; Y.A. Mohamed; M.A. Eyad; Mohamed Abdul Ridha Chunchun; Taha Hussein Yaseen	3:07.42	Oman; Unknown; Unknown; Ahmed Mubarak Saleh; Hamza Said Al Jabri	3:14.25
20 kilometres walk	Mohamed Ragab Saleh (EGY)	1:29:26	Mohamed Loqmane (MAR)	1:29:52 NR	Hassan Maataoui (MAR)	1:31:08
High jump	Fatiq Abdulghafoor (OMA)	2.15 m =NR	Hussein Falah Al-Ibrahimi (IRQ)	2.12 m	Mohamat Allamine Hamdi (QAT)	2.12 m
Pole vault	Seifeldin Abdelsalam (QAT)	5.40 m	Tamer Ashraf (EGY)	5.20 m NR	Hussain Al-Hizam (KSA)	5.20 m
Long jump	Salem Saleh Al-Jerbi (OMA)	7.75 m =NR	Zayed Latif (MAR)	7.69 m	Abdelouahed Bouhila (MAR)	7.47 m
Triple jump	Salem Saleh Al-Jerbi (OMA)	16.42 m NR	Abdelhakim Mlaab (MAR)	15.73 m	Mohamed Hammadi (MAR)	15.73 m
Shot put	Mostafa Amr Hassan (EGY)	20.63 m	Mohamed Magdi Hamza (EGY)	20.33 m	Mohamed Tolo (KSA)	19.12 m
Discus throw	Essa Mohamed Al-Zenkawi (KUW)	59.20 m	Mohamed Ibrahim Moaaz (QAT)	59.11 m	Shehab Mohamed Abdelaziz (EGY)	57.01 m
Hammer throw	Mostafa El Gamel (EGY)	75.70 m	Ismail Tarek Ahmed (EGY)	70.65 m	Mohsen Anani Youssef (TUN)	67.48 m
Javelin throw	Mustafa Mahmoud Abdelkhalek (EGY)	77.32 m	Abdulrahman Al-Azmi (KUW)	71.84 m	Ali Essa Abdelghani (KSA)	69.09 m
Decathlon	Ahmed Mahmoud Taher (EGY)	7032 pts	Abdelsajjad Saadoun Nasir (IRQ)	6823 pts	Saeed Mubarak (KSA)	6182 pts

=== Women ===
Event	Gold		Silver		Bronze	
100 metres (wind: +0.1 m/s)	Bassant Hemida (EGY)	11.33 CR	Aziza Sbaity (LBN)	11.69	Mudahawi Al-Shammari (KUW)	11.76
200 metres (wind: -0.4 m/s)	Aziza Sbaity (LBN)	23.81	Mudahawi Al-Shammari (KUW)	23.95	Sara El Hachimi (MAR)	23.99
400 metres	Salma Lehlali (MAR)	53.67	Sara El Hachimi (MAR)	54.18	Mustafa Avin Said (IRQ)	57.13
800 metres	Assia Raziki (MAR)	2:13.20	Soukaina Hajji (MAR)	2:13.62	Joan Makary (LBN)	2:21.72
1500 metres	Rababe Arafi (MAR)	4:24.37	Wafa Zeroual (MAR)	4:27.01	Layla Almasri (PLE)	4:37.41
5000 metres	Rahma Tahiri (MAR)	16:25.05	Kaoutar Farkoussi (MAR)	16:25.15	Habon Ahmed Djama (DJI)	16:37.07
10.000 metres	Soukaina Atanane (MAR)	35:36.05	Hanane Qallouj (MAR)	35:50.77	Hanin Tahir Al-Rimawy (PLE)	54:32.82
Half marathon	Rkia El Moukim (MAR)	1:15:00	Fatima Zahra Gardadi (MAR)	1:17:05	Habon Ahmed Djama (DJI)	1:18:50 NR
100 metres hurdles (wind: -1.8 m/s)	Lima Omar Jaber Ahmed (EGY)	13.55	Noura Ennadi (MAR)	13.73	Doha Razqi (MAR)	14.15
400 metres hurdles	Noura Ennadi (MAR)	54.98 CR	Doha Razqi (MAR)	59.75	Rasha Badrani (LBA)	1:05.16
3000 metres steeplechase	Ikram Ouaziz (MAR)	9:48.03	Khadija Nasiri (MAR)	10:27.29	Not awarded	
4 × 100 metres relay	Morocco; Unknown; Unknown; Imane Mekrazi; Hajer Eddou	46.04 CR NR	Egypt; Maram Mahmoud Ahmed; Lina Amr Gaber Ahmed; Esraa Owis; Asmaa Mohamed Gherib	46.62 NR	Iraq; Ruqaya Jameel Saad Al-Saeed; Diyeh Nizar Rafik; Kurdistan Jamal; Avin Said Mustafa	48.21
4 × 400 metres relay	Morocco; Unknown; Unknown; Unknown; Sara El Hachimi	3:39.88	Lebanon; Tala Fakhoury; Nada El Kurdi; Joan Makary; Rasha Badrani	4:23.66	Only two starting teams	
10000 m walk	Sirine Mejri (TUN)	46:58.22 CR	Soukaina Bouaoud (MAR)	47:35.98	Djamile Zoughmi (TUN)	48:00.16
High jump	Rhizlane Siba (MAR)	1.78 m	Mariah Al-Hafyan (MAR)	1.74 m	Maryam Abdulelah (IRQ)	1.74 m
Pole vault	Dora Mahfoudhi (TUN)	3.90 m	Dina Eltabaa (EGY)	3.65 m	Not awarded	
Long jump	Esraa Owis (EGY)	6.53 m	Yousra Lajdoud (MAR)	6.47 m	Enas Gharib-Mansour (EGY)	5.85 m
Triple jump	Esraa Owis (EGY)	13.08 m	Aya El-Aglaoui (MAR)	12.77 m	Meryem Ellouke (MAR)	12.67 m
Shot put	Nada Chroudi (TUN)	13.80 m	Zineb Zeroual (MAR)	13.14 m	Chaibia Bilmachi (MAR)	11.80 m
Discus throw	Rijaj Salim Al-Sakih (LBA)	51.50 m	Chaima Chouayakh (TUN)	50.31 m	Jihan Mrabet (MAR)	47.54 m
Hammer throw	Rawan Ayman Ibrahim Barakat (EGY)	63.47 m	Soukaina Zakour (MAR)	55.76 m	Sinda Gamrah (TUN)	54.90 m
Javelin throw	Nezha Marzak (MAR)	42.88 m	Nesrine Lachhab (TUN)	37.19 m	Shaima Bus'aal (MAR)	31.82 m
Heptathlon	Nada Chroudi (TUN)	5151 pts	Dounia Bamous (MAR)	3746 pts	Safaa Maskani (MAR)	3618 pts

== Medal table ==
Key

The host country is highlighted in lavender blue

Rank	Nation	Gold	Silver	Bronze	Total
1	Morocco*	17	25	14	56
2	Egypt	10	5	5	20
3	Qatar	5	3	0	8
4	Tunisia	4	2	3	9
5	Oman	3	1	1	5
6	Djibouti	2	2	2	6
7	Kuwait	2	2	1	5
8	Saudi Arabia	1	2	7	10
9	Libya	1	2	2	5
10	Lebanon	1	0	0	1
11	Iraq	0	3	3	6
12	Palestine	0	0	2	2
13	Somalia	0	0	1	1
13	Yemen	0	0	1	1
Totals (14 entries)		46	47	42	135

== See also ==
- Athletics at the 2023 Arab Games
