= Shinoona Al-Habsi =

Omani runner

Shinoona Salah Al-Habsi (born 3 July 1993 in Muscat, Oman) is an Omani runner. She competed at the 2012 Summer Olympics in the 100 m event and she was eliminated after the preliminary round.

== Career ==
Al-Habsi first competed at the 2011 Arab Games, where she made the 100 m and 200 m finals finishing 5th and 7th respectively.

At the London Olympics, Al-Habsi was so nervous she was "dancing, more than shaking". She ran 12.45 seconds over 100 m to place 4th in her preliminary round heat.

Al-Habsi won an individual 200 m bronze medal at the 2012 West Asian Athletics Championships as well as bronze in the 4 × 100 m relay. She continued to compete at the 2013 Arab Athletics Championships, winning a bronze medal as a member of the Omani 4 × 100 m team. At the 2013 Islamic Solidarity Games, Al-Habsi won two additional bronze medals in the 4 × 100 m and 4 × 400 m events.

She also competed at the 2014 Asian Games in the 100 m and 200 m. She placed 7th in her 100 m heat and 6th in her 200 m heat and did not advance in either event.

At the 2015 Arab Athletics Championships, Al-Habsi also contested the 100 m and 200 m. Though she did not advance in the 200 m, she made the finals of the 100 m where she finished 6th.

By July 2016, Al-Habsi had improved her personal best to 11.60 seconds.

== Personal life ==
Al-Habsi has ten siblings and was the first of 32 grandchildren to her aunt Maryam Al Shukairi's parents. In addition to being Omani, her aunt's parents are from Tanzania. Some of her community members disagreed with Al-Habsi's decision to run as a career.

Al-Habsi was married in December 2013 to Ali Al Mabsali, a petroleum engineer. After her marriage, she took a one-year break from running. During her break, she got sick repeatedly and a doctor told her that her sickness was because she was no longer running. Her husband supported her return to running, saying "I married you. You are an athlete. I know you are an athlete. I married an athlete and a lady. Not a lady who sits at home".

She gave birth to a son in February 2016. Though she didn't compete at the 2016 Olympics, she hoped to continue at future championships.

== See also ==
- Muslim women in sport
