= Danah Al-Nasrallah =

Kuwaiti sprinter

Personal information
- Born: 7 March 1988 (age 38) Kuwait City, Kuwait
- Home town: Kuwait City, Kuwait
- Education: Michigan State University, Tualatin High School

Sport
- Country: Kuwait
- Sport: Track and field
- Event: Mid Distance Runner

Achievements and titles
- Olympic finals: Athens 2004

Dana or Danah Al-Nasrallah (born 7 March 1988) is a Kuwaiti female track and field athlete competing in sprinting events. In 2004, she became the first Kuwaiti female Olympic competitor.
