= Mudhawi Al-Shammari =

Kuwaiti sprinter

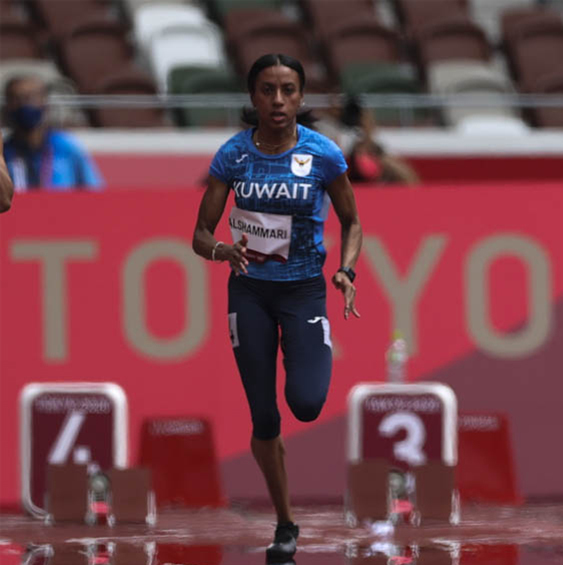
- Mudhawi Al-Shammari in 2021

Personal information
- Born: Mudhawi Al-Shammari; 25 April 1998 (age 28)

Sport
- Sport: Track and field
- Events: 100 m, 200 m

Mudhawi Al-Shammari (born 25 April 1998) is a Kuwaiti athlete.

The holder of Kuwaiti national records both indoor and outdoor in 100 metres and 200 metres, she competed at the Athletics at the 2020 Summer Olympics – Women's 100 metres, she qualified from the preliminary heats into the first round with a run of 11.82 seconds.

== See also ==
- List of Kuwaiti records in athletics
