= Athletics at the GCC Games =

Athletics at a multi-sport competition

Athletics is one of the sports at the quadrennial GCC Games competition. It has been one of the sports competed at the event since the inaugural edition in 2011.

Until the 2022 edition, women competed at the separate GCC Women's Games event. The Games record in the men's 100 m was set by Tosin Ogunode in 2022 with a time of 10.05 seconds.

== Editions ==
Games	Year	Host city	Host country	Main venue	Best nation
I	2011	Isa Town	Bahrain		Kuwait (KUW)
II	2015	Qatif	Saudi Arabia		Saudi Arabia (KSA)
III	2022	Kuwait City	Kuwait		Bahrain (BRN)
IV	2026	Doha	Qatar	Suheim bin Hamad Stadium	Qatar (QAT)

== All-time medal table ==
Updated after the 2022 GCC Games

Rank	Nation	Gold	Silver	Bronze	Total
1	Bahrain (BRN)	24	21	7	52
2	Saudi Arabia (KSA)	19	21	31	71
3	Qatar (QAT)	18	12	7	37
4	Kuwait (KUW)	14	14	13	41
5	Oman (OMA)	8	7	6	21
6	United Arab Emirates (UAE)	3	5	9	17
Totals (6 entries)		86	80	73	239
