= Tariq Al-Amri =

Saudi Arabian long-distance runner

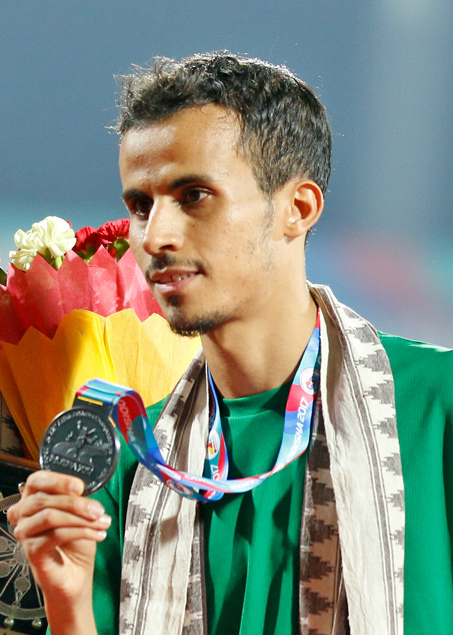
- Al-Amri in 2017

Personal information
- Nationality: Saudi Arabian
- Born: 23 December 1990 (age 35) Riyadh, Saudi Arabia
- Height: 165 cm (5 ft 5 in)
- Weight: 49 kg (108 lb)

Sport
- Sport: Track and field
- Event: Long-distance running

Achievements and titles
- Personal bests: 3000 metres: 7:46.72; 5000 metres: 13:19.70; 10,000 metres: 29:39.22
- Updated on 28 September 2019

Tariq Ahmed Al-Amri (born December 23, 1990) is a Saudi Arabian long-distance runner. He competed at the 2016 Summer Olympics in the men's 5000 metres race; his time of 14:26.90 in the heats did not qualify him for the final.

Al-Amri won bronze in the 5000m at the 2017 Asian Athletics Championships, having finished 9th in the 2016 Asian Indoor Athletics Championships in Doha.
