= Mazoon Al-Alawi =

Omani sprinter (born 1997)

Mazoon Al-alawi
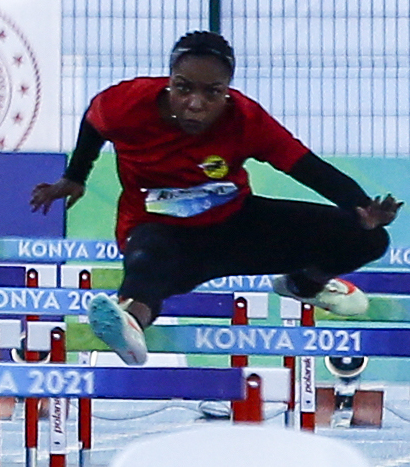
- Mazoon Al-Alawi in 2022

Personal information
- Full name: Mazoon Khalfan Saleh Al-Alawi
- Nationality: Omani
- Born: 14 November 1997 (age 28) Sur, Oman

Sport
- Sport: Athletics

Mazoon Khalfan Saleh Al-Alawi (born 14 November 1997) is an Omani sprinter.

== Career ==
She competed at the 2016 Summer Olympics in Rio de Janeiro, in the women's 100 metres. She progressed from the first preliminary round with a time of 12.30 seconds. In the quarterfinal, she finished with a time of 12.43 seconds. She did not advance to the semifinals.
