= Tosin Ogunode =

Nigerian-Qatari sprinter

Personal information
- Full name: Tosin Joseph Ogunode
- Nationality: Qatari
- Born: 2 March 1994 (age 32) Nigeria
- Height: 1.74 m (5 ft 9 in)
- Weight: 80 kg (176 lb)

Sport
- Sport: Track and field
- Event: Sprints
Medal record
Representing Qatar
Asian Games
Silver medal – second place	2018 Jakarta-Palembang	100 m
Asian Indoor Championships
Silver medal – second place	2018 Tehran	60 m

Tosin Joseph Ogunode (born 2 March 1994) is a Nigerian-born track and field sprinter who competes internationally for Qatar.

He is the younger brother of Femi Ogunode, another Nigerian-turned-Qatari sprinter who won two golds at the 2010 Asian Games. Tosin Ogunode made his debut at the start of the 2014 season and promptly set an Asian indoor record of 6.50 seconds for the 60 metres event at the Northern Arizona University indoor facility in the United States. This improved Talal Mansour's twenty-year-old record for the distance. This placed him top of the world rankings for a short period. His name is the shortened form of "Oluwatosin" meaning "God is worthy to be worshiped" in Yoruba
