= West Asian Athletics Championships =

West Asian Athletics Championships are an athletics event organised by the West Asian Athletics Association (WAAA) and contested by 13 nations of Western Asia. The inaugural event took place in 2010 in Aleppo, Syria. The competition was organized after the discontinuation of the West Asian Games.

In 2024, some of the West Asian Championships events were held during the 2024 Doha Diamond League.

== Editions ==
=== Seniors ===
| Edition | Year | City | Country | Date | Events | Nations | Top of the medal table |
|---|---|---|---|---|---|---|---|
| 1 | 2010 | Aleppo | Syria | 18–20 September | 46 | 12 | Bahrain |
| 2 | 2012 | Dubai | United Arab Emirates | 12–15 December | 45 | 12 | Iran |
| 3 | 2018 | Amman | Jordan | 8–11 July | 44 | 10 | Bahrain |
| 4 | 2023 | Doha | Qatar | 26–29 April | 42 | 12 | Qatar |
| 5 | 2024 | Basra | Iraq | 29 May – 1 June | 45 | 10 | Iran |

=== U20 ===
1. 2022 West Asian U20 Athletics Championships

=== U18 ===
1. 2013 West Asian U18 Athletics Championships

== Participating nations ==
- Bahrain
- Iran
- Iraq
- Jordan
- Kuwait
- Lebanon
- Oman
- Palestine
- Qatar
- Saudi Arabia
- Syria
- United Arab Emirates
- Yemen

== Medals (2010-2024) ==
| Rank | Nation | Gold | Silver | Bronze | Total |
|---|---|---|---|---|---|
| 1 | Iran (IRI) | 46 | 40 | 19 | 105 |
| 2 | Bahrain (BHR) | 40 | 20 | 16 | 76 |
| 3 | Qatar (QAT) | 28 | 16 | 15 | 59 |
| 4 | Iraq (IRQ) | 25 | 28 | 37 | 90 |
| 5 | Kuwait (KUW) | 20 | 21 | 23 | 64 |
| 6 | Oman (OMA) | 13 | 11 | 14 | 38 |
| 7 | Lebanon (LBN) | 11 | 22 | 15 | 48 |
| 8 | Jordan (JOR) | 11 | 7 | 13 | 31 |
| 9 | United Arab Emirates (UAE) | 10 | 16 | 14 | 40 |
| 10 | Syria (SYR) | 10 | 14 | 13 | 37 |
| 11 | Saudi Arabia (KSA) | 7 | 12 | 7 | 26 |
| 12 | Yemen (YEM) | 1 | 1 | 0 | 2 |
| 13 | Palestine (PLE) | 0 | 0 | 2 | 2 |
| Totals (13 entries) | | 222 | 208 | 188 | 618 |

== Medals by Editions ==
| Number | Events | Gold | Silver | Bronze | Total |
|---|---|---|---|---|---|
| 1 - 2010 | 46 | 46 | 46 | 48 | 140 |
| 2 - 2012 | 45 | 45 | 40 | 32 | 117 |
| 3 - 2018 | 44 | 44 | 34 | 27 | 105 |
| 4 - 2023 | 42 | 42 | 42 | 41 | 125 |
| 5 - 2024 | 45 | 45 | 46 | 40 | 131 |
| Total | 222 | 222 | 208 | 188 | 618 |

== Championships records ==
=== Men ===
| Event | Record | Athlete | Nationality | Date | Meet | Place | Ref. |
|---|---|---|---|---|---|---|---|
| 100 m | 9.97 (+1.7 m/s) | Barakat Al-Harthi | Oman | 9 July 2018 | 2018 Championships | Amman, Jordan | |
| 200 m | 20.62 (±0.0 m/s) | Abdulaziz Abdou Atafi | Saudi Arabia | 1 June 2024 | 2024 Championships | Basra, Iraq | |
| 400 m | 45.40 | Ammar Ismail Yahiya Ibrahim | Qatar | 30 May 2024 | 2024 Championships | Basra, Iraq | |
| 800 m | | | | | | | |
| 1500 m | | | | | | | |
| 5000 m | | | | | | | |
| 10,000 m | | | | | | | |
| 110 m hurdles | 13.67 (+1.5 m/s) | Yacoub Mohamed Al-Yohal | Kuwait | 26 April 2023 | 2023 Championships | Doha, Qatar | |
| 400 m hurdles | 49.94 | Ismail Daoudi Abakar | Qatar | 28 April 2023 | 2023 Championships | Doha, Qatar | |
| High jump | | | | | | | |
| Pole vault | 5.21 m | Ameer Subeih Sehioud | Iraq | 31 May 2024 | 2024 Championships | Basra, Iraq | |
| Shot put | 20.65 m | Abdelrahman Mahmoud | Bahrain | 27 April 2023 | 2023 Championships | Doha, Qatar | |
| Javelin throw | 75.10 m | Ali Essa Abdulghani | Saudi Arabia | 29 May 2024 | 2024 Championships | Basra, Iraq | |
| 10000m walk (track) | 46:55.00 | Hamid Reza Zouravand | Iran | 29 May 2024 | 2024 Championships | Basra, Iraq | |
| 4 × 100 m relay | 39.43 | B .M. Al-Harthi; A. A. Al-Baloushi; R. H. Al-Asimi; M. O. Al-Saadi | Oman | 29 April 2023 | 2023 Championships | Doha, Qatar | |
| 4 × 400 m relay | | | | | | | |

=== Women ===
| Event | Record | Athlete | Nationality | Date | Meet | Place | Ref. |
|---|---|---|---|---|---|---|---|
| 100 m | | | | | | | |
| 200 m | | | | | | | |
| 400 m | | | | | | | |
| 800 m | | | | | | | |
| 1500 m | | | | | | | |
| 5000 m | 16:01.80 | Bontu Edao Rebitu | Bahrain | 28 April 2023 | 2023 Championships | Doha, Qatar | |
| 10,000 m | | | | | | | |
| High jump | 1.77 m | Mariyam Abd.Abdulhameed | Iraq | 31 May 2024 | 2024 Championships | Basra, Iraq | |
| Pole vault | 3.80 m | Mahsa Mirzatabibi | Iran | 29 May 2024 | 2024 Championships | Basra, Iraq | |
| Long jump | 6.22 m (NWI) | Reyhaneh Mobini Arani | Iran | 30 May 2024 | 2024 Championships | Basra, Iraq | |
| Triple jump | 12.82 m (NWI) | Maryam Kazemi | Iran | 1 June 2024 | 2024 Championships | Basra, Iraq | |
| Discus throw | 49.42 m | Mahla Mahrooghi | Iran | 1 June 2024 | 2024 Championships | Basra, Iraq | |
| Hammer throw | 56.52 m | Melika Norouzi Ashgar | Iran | 30 May 2024 | 2024 Championships | Basra, Iraq | |
| Javelin throw | 50.57 m | Mana Hosseini | Iran | 31 May 2024 | 2024 Championships | Basra, Iraq | |
| Heptathlon | 5249 pts | Fatemeh Mohitizadeh | Iran | 31 May–1 June 2024 | 2024 Championships | Basra, Iraq | |
| Heptathlon | 100m H / High jump / Shot put / 200m / Long jump / Javelin / 800m; 14.13 (+0.2 m/s) / 1.71 m / 11.04 m / 25.89 (±0.0 m/s) / 5.48 m (NWI) / 35.57 m / 2:26.27 | | | | | | |
| 5000 metres race walk (track) | 27:39.00 | Fatemeh Zahra Ghalenoui | Iran | 30 May 2024 | 2024 Championships | Basra, Iraq | |
| 4 × 100 m relay | | | | | | | |
| 4 × 400 m relay | | | | | | | |

=== Mixed ===
| Event | Record | Athlete | Nationality | Date | Meet | Place | Ref. |
|---|---|---|---|---|---|---|---|
| 4 × 400 m relay | 3:27.12 | M. A. Chunchun; S. F. Abboud; T. H. Yaseen; B. M. Mahmoud | Iraq | 29 May 2024 | 2024 Championships | Basra, Iraq | |

== See also ==
- Athletics at the West Asian Games
- Asian Athletics Championships
- Maghreb Athletics Championships
- Athletics at the SEA Games

== Links ==
- https://www.athleticspodium.com/champs/west-asian-champs/2010-west-asian-championships
- https://www.athleticspodium.com/champs/west-asian-champs/2012-west-asian-championships
- https://www.athleticspodium.com/champs/west-asian-champs/2018-west-asian-championships
- https://www.athleticspodium.com/champs/west-asian-champs/2023-west-asian-championships
