= Ali Khamis =

Bahraini track and field athlete (born 1995)

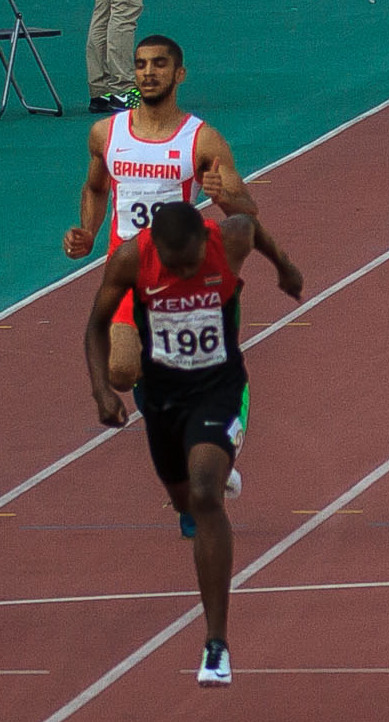
- Ali Khamis (back) at the 2015 Military World Games

Personal information
- Height: 1.82 m (5 ft 11 1/2 in)
- Weight: 70 kg (154 lb)

Sport
- Country: Bahrain
- Sport: Track and field
- Event: 400 metres
Medal record
Asian Games
Gold medal – first place	2014 Incheon	400 m hurdles
Bronze medal – third place	2018 Jakarta	400 m
Gold medal – first place	2018 Jakarta	Mixed 4 × 400 metres relay
Asian Championships
Silver medal – second place	2013 Pune	400 m

Ali Khamis Abbas Ali Khamis (born 30 June 1995) is a Bahraini track and field athlete who competes mainly in the 400 metres sprint and 400 metres hurdles. His personal best for the flat event is 44.36 seconds, set in 2013, while his hurdles best is 49.55 seconds, set in 2014. He was the 2014 Asian Games champion in the hurdles and the runner-up in the sprint at the 2013 Asian Athletics Championships

== Career ==
Khamis made his international debut at the 2011 World Youth Championships in Athletics. There he ran in the heats of the 400 m hurdles and set a personal best of 54.27 seconds over the youth height barriers. He also was part of Bahrain's Swedish medley relay team. At the 2012 Asian Junior Athletics Championships – despite winning his heat in a best of 52.67 seconds – he faltered in the 400 m hurdles final and finished last. He also competed at the 2012 World Junior Championships in Athletics, running in the heats only.

Two national junior records in the 400 metres sprint came for Khamis at the 2013 Arab Athletics Championships: he ran 46.90 seconds in the qualifiers then 46.25 seconds in the final to take the bronze medal (his first senior podium finish) behind Saudi athletes Yousef Masrahi and Ismail Al-Sabiani. He reached the podium for a second time that year at the 2013 Asian Athletics Championships. wtsh

repeated as champion, Khamis took the silver medal with a significant new best time of 45.65 seconds.[5]

Khamis began his 2014 season with a 400 m sprint/hurdles double at the Arab Junior Athletics Championships in Cairo. He made his debut on the IAAF Diamond League circuit in May, running in the 400 m at the Doha Diamond League and placing runner-up. The hurdles remained his focus that year, as he returned in the event at the 2014 World Junior Championships in Athletics. He set a string of bests at the competition, improving from 51.10 in the heats to 49.55 seconds in the final – a time which brought him second place to Jamaica's Jaheel Hyde. He maintained this form at the 2014 Asian Games held two months later and a run of 49.71 seconds was enough for the Bahraini teenager to win the 400 m hurdles gold medal. He ranked in the top fifty worldwide and second in Asia on time that season, behind only Kazakhstan's Dmitriy Koblov.

== Achievements ==
- Ranked in top 8 in Olympic Games
- One time Asian Games winner
- Asian Championships Silver Medalist
- World Junior Championships Silver medalist
- World Rank 23 in Men's 400 metres scoring 1220
- Ranks 319 Globally in Men's Overall Rank with the Score 1220

== Personal bests ==
- 100 metres - 10.69 seconds (28.06.2015)
- 200 metres – 20.81 seconds (11.07.2015)
- 400 metres – 44.36 seconds (14.08.2016)
- 400 metres hurdles – 49.55 seconds (25.07.2014)
- Sprint Medley 1000 metres - 1:59.16 (09.07.2011)
- 4 x 400 metres - 3:11.11 (20.05.2017)

== International competitions ==
Year	Competition	Venue	Position	Event	Notes
2011	World Youth Championships	Lille, France	4th (heats)	400 m hurdles	54.27
2011	World Youth Championships	Lille, France	(heats)	Medley relay	1:59.16
2012	Asian Junior Championships	Colombo, Sri Lanka	8th	400 m hurdles	57.45
2012	World Junior Championships	Barcelona, Spain	7th (heats)	400 m hurdles	53.90
2013	Arab Championships	Doha, Qatar	3rd	400 m	46.25
2013	Asian Championships	Pune, India	2nd	400 m	45.65
2014	Arab Junior Championships	Cairo, Egypt	1st	400 m	46.15
2014	Arab Junior Championships	Cairo, Egypt	1st	400 m hurdles	51.42
2014	World Junior Championships	Eugene, United States	2nd	400 m hurdles	49.55
2014	Asian Games	Incheon, South Korea	1st	400 m hurdles	49.71
2015	Arab Championships	Isa Town, Bahrain	1st	400 m hurdles	50.10
2015	Military World Games	Munyeong, South Korea	6th	400 m hurdles	50.94
2015	Military World Games	Munyeong, South Korea	—	4 × 400 m relay	DQ
2016	Olympic Games	Rio de Janeiro, Brazil	6th	400 m	44.36
2018	Asian Games	Jakarta, Indonesia	3rd	400 m	45.70
2018	Asian Games	Jakarta, Indonesia	5th	4 × 400 m relay	3:03.97
2022	GCC Games	Kuwait City, Kuwait	3rd	400 m	45.96
2022	GCC Games	Kuwait City, Kuwait	1st	4 × 400 m relay	3:06.20
2022	Islamic Solidarity Games	Konya, Turkey	3rd	4 × 400 m relay	3:04.79
2022	Islamic Solidarity Games	Konya, Turkey	1st	4 × 400 m mixed relay	3:17.40
