= 2019 Asian Athletics Championships – Men's 400 metres hurdles =

Men's 400 metres hurdles at the 2019 Asian Athletics Championships
- Venue: Khalifa International Stadium
- Location: Doha, Qatar
- Dates: 21 April (heats); 22 April (final)
- Competitors: 18 from 14 nations
- Winning time: 47.51 CR

Medalists
gold medal	Abderrahman Samba	Qatar
silver medal	Chen Chieh	Chinese Taipei
bronze medal	Jabir Madari Pillyalil	India

The men's 400 metres hurdles at the 2019 Asian Athletics Championships was held on 21 and 22 April.

== Records ==
Records before the 2019 Asian Athletics Championships
Record	Athlete (nation)	Time (s)	Location	Date
World record	Kevin Young (USA)	46.78	Barcelona, Spain	6 August 1992
Asian record	Abderrahman Samba (QAT)	46.98	Paris, France	30 June 2018
Championship record	Mubarak Al-Nubi (QAT)	48.67	Colombo, Sri Lanka	12 August 2002
World leading	Dharun Ayyasamy (IND)	48.80	Patiala, India	16 March 2019
Asian leading	Dharun Ayyasamy (IND)	48.80	Patiala, India	16 March 2019

== Results ==
=== Heats ===
Qualification rule: First 3 in each heat (Q) and the next 2 fastest (q) qualified for the final.

Rank	Heat	Name	Nationality	Time	Notes
1	2	Abderrahman Samba	Qatar	49.57	Q, SB
2	1	Takatoshi Abe	Japan	49.63	Q
3	2	Chen Chieh	Chinese Taipei	49.87	Q
4	2	Bassem Hemeida	Qatar	49.98	Q, SB
5	2	Jabir Madari Pillyalil	India	50.15	q
6	1	Yu Chia-hsuan	Chinese Taipei	50.22	Q, SB
7	2	Mahdi Pirjahan	Iran	50.32	q, NR
8	1	Mehboob Ali	Pakistan	50.40	Q, SB
9	2	Feng Zhiqiang	China	50.71	SB
10	2	Lim Chan-ho	South Korea	50.94	
11	1	Gong Debin	China	50.96	SB
12	1	Abdullah Rizqallah Mulayhi	Saudi Arabia	51.15	
13	2	Dmitriy Koblov	Kazakhstan	51.39	SB
14	1	Francis Medina	Philippines	52.49	
15	1	Alisher Pulotov	Tajikistan	52.88	PB
16	2	Ow Yeong Wei Bin	Singapore	54.14	
17	1	Amor Ebed Abdalmujied	Qatar	55.08	SB
18	1	Pipatporn Paungpi	Thailand	55.18	SB

=== Final ===
Rank	Lane	Name	Nationality	Time	Notes
1st place, gold medalist(s)	5	Abderrahman Samba	Qatar	47.51	WL, CR
2nd place, silver medalist(s)	6	Chen Chieh	Chinese Taipei	48.92	PB
3rd place, bronze medalist(s)	3	Jabir Madari Pillyalil	India	49.13	PB
4	8	Bassem Hemeida	Qatar	49.45	PB
5	7	Takatoshi Abe	Japan	49.74	
6	2	Mahdi Pirjahan	Iran	50.18	NR
7	4	Yu Chia-hsuan	Chinese Taipei	50.31	
8	9	Mehboob Ali	Pakistan	50.94	
