= 2013 Asian Athletics Championships – Men's 400 metres =

The men's 400 metres event at the 2013 Asian Athletics Championships was held at the Shree Shiv Chhatrapati Sports Complex. The final took place on 4 July.

== Medalists ==
Gold	Silver	Bronze
Yousef Masrahi; Saudi Arabia	Ali Khamis Khamis; Bahrain	Yuzo Kanemaru; Japan

== Results ==
=== Heats ===
First 3 in each heat (Q) and 4 best performers (q) advanced to the semifinals.

Rank	Heat	Name	Nationality	Time	Notes
1	1	Ali Khamis Khamis	Bahrain	46.43	Q
2	3	Yuzo Kanemaru	Japan	46.46	Q
3	1	Musaeb Abdulrahman Balla	Qatar	46.59	Q
4	3	Arokia Rajiv	India	46.67	Q
5	3	Ehsan Tahmasebi	Iran	46.96	Q
6	2	Yousef Masrahi	Saudi Arabia	46.99	Q
7	1	Ismail Al-Sabiani	Saudi Arabia	47.02	Q
8	2	Kunhu Muhammed Puthanpurakkal	India	47.04	Q
9	1	Chanaka Dilhan Aloka	Sri Lanka	47.10	q
10	3	Hassan Aman Salmeen	Qatar	47.24	q
11	2	Alejan Edgardo Jr.	Philippines	47.40	Q
12	2	Anjana Madushan Gunarathna	Sri Lanka	47.43	q
13	4	Saud Abdul Karim	United Arab Emirates	47.67	Q
14	1	Archand Christian Bagsit	Philippines	47.87	q
15	4	Kazuya Watanabe	Japan	48.04	Q
16	3	Aleksandr Pronzhenko	Tajikistan	48.23	
17	4	Sajjad Hashemi	Iran	48.27	Q
18	4	Neeraj Panwar	India	48.51	
19	4	Asad Iqbal	Pakistan	48.85	
20	1	Arnon Jaiaree	Thailand	48.87	
21	2	Mohsen Ahmad	Lebanon	48.90	
22	1	Anchois Aron	Malaysia	48.96	
23	4	Thanakorn Namee	Thailand	49.09	
24	2	Choi Ho Sing	Hong Kong	49.17	
25	3	Ak Hafiy Tajuddin Rositi	Brunei	49.42	
26	4	Leung King Hung	Hong Kong	49.49	
27	2	Sundui Munkhsaikhan	Mongolia	52.48	
28	3	Salim Saleh Al-Hekr	Yemen	53.90	
29	2	Muhammes Abdullah Munassar	Yemen	54.90	
30	3	Tang Chan Tong	Macau	58.64	
	1	Naser Al-Semaeil	Kuwait	DNS	

=== Semi-finals ===
First 3 in each heat (Q) and 2 best performers (q) advanced to the final.

Rank	Heat	Name	Nationality	Time	Notes
1	1	Ali Khamis Khamis	Bahrain	46.35	Q
2	2	Yousef Masrahi	Saudi Arabia	46.42	Q
3	1	Musaeb Abdulrahman Balla	Qatar	46.44	Q
4	2	Yuzo Kanemaru	Japan	46.49	Q
5	2	Arokia Rajiv	India	46.83	Q
6	2	Kunhu Muhammed Puthanpurakkal	India	47.03	q
7	1	Saud Abdul Karim	United Arab Emirates	47.05	Q
8	1	Sajjad Hashemi	Iran	47.06	q
9	1	Ehsan Tahmasebi	Iran	47.14	
10	1	Chanaka Dilhan Aloka	Sri Lanka	47.39	
11	2	Anjana Madushan Gunarathna	Sri Lanka	47.70	
12	1	Kazuya Watanabe	Japan	47.80	
13	1	Archand Christian Bagsit	Philippines	47.93	
14	2	Alejan Edgardo Jr.	Philippines	48.18	
	2	Ismail Al-Sabiani	Saudi Arabia	DNF	
	2	Hassan Aman Salmeen	Qatar	DNS	

=== Final ===
Rank	Name	Nationality	Time	Notes
1st place, gold medalist(s)	Yousef Masrahi	Saudi Arabia	45.08	
2nd place, silver medalist(s)	Ali Khamis Khamis	Bahrain	45.65	
3rd place, bronze medalist(s)	Yuzo Kanemaru	Japan	45.95	
4	Musaeb Abdulrahman Balla	Qatar	46.45	
5	Kunhu Muhammed Puthanpurakkal	India	46.61	
6	Arokia Rajiv	India	46.63	
7	Saud Abdul Karim	United Arab Emirates	47.15	
	Sajjad Hashemi	Iran	DNS	
