= K. S. Jeevan =

Indian sprinter

Personal information
- Full name: Jeevan Karekoppa Suresh
- Born: 26 January 1993 (age 33) Karekoppa, Somwarpet, Karnataka, India
- Height: 6 ft 0 in (183 cm)
- Weight: 72 kg (159 lb)

Sport
- Country: India
- Sport: Track and field
- Event: 400 metres
Medal record
Men's Athletics
Representing India
Asian Games
Silver medal – second place	2018 Jakarta	4 × 400 m
South Asian Games
Silver medal – second place	2019 Kathmandu	4 × 400 m
Bronze medal – third place	2019 Kathmandu	400 m

Jeevan Karekoppa Suresh (born 26 January 1993) is an Indian sprinter who specializes in the 400 metres. He was part of the Indian men's 4 × 400 metres relay team that won the silver medal at the 2018 Asian Games.

The quartet of Kunhu Muhammed, Jeevan, Jithu Baby and Dharun Ayyasamy ran 3:06.48 in the heats of the men's 4 × 400 metres relay of 2018 Asian Games. Jeevan was not part of the quartet that ran 3:01.85 in the final to win the silver medal.

At the 2019 Asian Athletics Championships, the Indian team of Muhammed, Jeevan, Muhammed Anas and Arokia Rajiv had finished second in the final of the men's 4 × 400 metres relay event, but was disqualified for causing obstruction.

He won a bronze medal in 400 m event at South Asian Games 2019.

As of 2018, Jeevan works at the Department of Posts in Bangalore.
