= Athletics at the 2018 Asian Games – Men's 400 metres hurdles =

Men's 400 metres hurdles at the 2018 Asian Games
- Venue: Gelora Bung Karno Stadium
- Date: 26–27 August 2018
- Competitors: 22 from 15 nations

Medalists
gold medal	Abderrahman Samba	Qatar
silver medal	Dharun Ayyasamy	India
bronze medal	Takatoshi Abe	Japan

The men's 400 metres hurdles competition at the 2018 Asian Games took place on 26 and 27 August 2018 at the Gelora Bung Karno Stadium.

== Schedule ==
All times are Western Indonesia Time (UTC+07:00)

Date	Time	Event
Sunday, 26 August 2018	20:25	Round 1
Monday, 27 August 2018	19:00	Final

== Records ==
Prior to this competition, the existing world, Asian and Games records were as follows.

World Record	Kevin Young (USA)	46.78	Barcelona, Spain	6 August 1992
Asian Record	Abderrahman Samba (QAT)	46.98	Paris, France	30 June 2018
Games Record	Hadi Soua'an Al-Somaily (KSA)	48.42	Busan, South Korea	8 October 2002

== Results ==
Legend

- DNF — Did not finish
- DNS — Did not start

=== Round 1 ===
- Qualification: First 2 in each heat (Q) and the next 2 fastest (q) advance to the final.

==== Heat 1 ====
Rank	Athlete	Time	Notes
1	Takatoshi Abe (JPN)	49.71	Q
2	Dmitriy Koblov (KAZ)	50.58	Q
3	Han Se-hyun (KOR)	50.69	q
4	Francis Medina (PHI)	51.68	
5	Andrian (INA)	51.93	
6	Abdullah Mulahyi (KSA)	52.42	
—	Feng Zhiqiang (CHN)	DNS	

==== Heat 2 ====
Rank	Athlete	Time	Notes
1	Chen Chieh (TPE)	50.30	Q
2	Santhosh Kumar Tamilarasan (IND)	50.46	Q
3	Takayuki Kishimoto (JPN)	50.95	
4	Mehboob Ali (PAK)	51.27	
5	Cai Junqi (CHN)	51.37	
6	Halomoan Edwin Binsar (INA)	53.28	
7	Phan Khắc Hoàng (VIE)	53.47	

==== Heat 3 ====
Rank	Athlete	Time	Notes
1	Abderrahman Samba (QAT)	49.34	Q
2	Dharun Ayyasamy (IND)	49.55	Q
3	Eric Cray (PHI)	50.54	q
4	Yu Chia-hsuan (TPE)	50.84	
5	Reza Malekpour (IRI)	50.99	
6	Pipatporn Paungpi (THA)	53.74	
7	Chan Ka Chun (HKG)	53.94	
—	Quách Công Lịch (VIE)	DNF	

=== Final ===
Rank	Athlete	Time	Notes
1st place, gold medalist(s)	Abderrahman Samba (QAT)	47.66	GR
2nd place, silver medalist(s)	Dharun Ayyasamy (IND)	48.96	
3rd place, bronze medalist(s)	Takatoshi Abe (JPN)	49.12	
4	Chen Chieh (TPE)	49.62	
5	Santhosh Kumar Tamilarasan (IND)	49.66	
6	Dmitriy Koblov (KAZ)	50.60	
7	Eric Cray (PHI)	51.53	
8	Han Se-hyun (KOR)	51.65	
