= 2012 World Junior Championships in Athletics – Men's 4 × 400 metres relay =

The men's 4 × 400 metres relay at the 2012 World Junior Championships in Athletics was held at the Estadi Olímpic Lluís Companys on 14 and 15 July.

== Medalists ==
Gold	Silver	Bronze
United States; Quincy Downing; Aldrich Bailey; Chidi Okezie; Arman Hall	Poland; Karol Zalewski; Rafał Smoleń; Piotr Kuśnierz; Patryk Dobek	Trinidad and Tobago; Asa Guevara; Jereem Richards; Brandon Benjamin; Machel Cedenio

== Records ==
Prior to the competition, the existing world junior and championship records were as follows.

World Junior Record & Championship Record	United States (Brandon Johnson, LaShawn Merritt, Jason Craig, Kerron Clement)	3:01.09	Grosseto, Italy	18 July 2004
World Junior Leading	Trinidad and Tobago (Asa Guevara, Brandon Benjamin, Theon Lewis, Machel Cedenio)	3:05.95	Port of Spain, Trinidad and Tobago	24 June 2012
Broken records during the 2012 World Junior Championships in Athletics
World Junior Leading	United States (Quincy Downing, Aldrich Bailey, Chidi Okezie, Arman Hall)	3:03.99	Barcelona, Spain	15 July 2012

== Results ==
=== Heats ===
Qualification: First 2 of each heat (Q) plus the 2 fastest times (q) qualified

Rank	Heat	Lane	Nation	Athletes	Time	Notes
1	2	3	United States	Quincy Downing, Eric Futch, Chidi Okezie, Arman Hall	3:06.26	Q, SB
2	2	7	Australia	Jarryd Buchan, Jay Meaney, Max Waldron, Steven Solomon	3:07.49	Q, SB
3	2	4	Poland	Piotr Kuśnierz, Rafał Smoleń, Paweł Walczuk, Patryk Dobek	3:07.85	q, SB
4	2	6	Saudi Arabia	Ibrahim Mohammed Saleh, Abdullah Ahmed Abkar, Bandar Atiyah Kaabi, Basheer Atiah Al Barakati	3:07.88	q, NJ
5	3	5	Japan	Naohiro Yokoyama, Kenta Kimura, Shota Kozuma, Kazushi Kimura	3:08.16	Q, SB
5	3	4	Trinidad and Tobago	Asa Guevara, Jereem Richards, Brandon Benjamin, Machel Cedenio	3:08.16	Q
7	3	3	Russia	Timofey Chalyy, Roman Semakin, Radel Kashefrazov, Nikita Vesnin	3:08.58	SB
8	3	6	Germany	Tobias Lange, Lukas Schmitz, Bennet Steudel, David Brücher	3:08.82	SB
9	1	3	Jamaica	Shavon Barnes, Omar McLeod, Jermaine Fyffe, Lennox Williams	3:08.83	Q, SB
10	1	7	Italy	Vito Incantalupo, Alberto Rontini, Davide Re, Michele Tricca	3:08.87	Q, SB
11	1	4	Bahamas	Julian Munroe, Stephen Newbold, Elroy McBride, O'Jay Ferguson	3:08.96	SB
12	3	7	Ghana	Shadrack Adu-Gyamfi, Daniel Gyasi, Solomon Afful, Kwame Ankomah-Donyina	3:11.46	PB
13	3	8	Norway	Sondre Nyvold Lid, Andreas Roth, Marius Bakken Støle, Markus Loftås	3:12.27	NJ
14	2	5	Canada	Benjamin Ayesu-Attah, Christopher Green, Marc-André Alexandre, Drelan Bramwell	3:13.68	SB
15	1	6	Spain	Julio Arenas, Lucas Bua, David Jiménez, Sergi Torres	3:14.85	SB
16	3	9	Finland	Jussi Kanervo, Joni Vainio-Kaila, Ville Lampinen, Jani Koskela	3:15.48	PB
17	1	8	India	Sandeep Sandeep, Sanjeev Sheokand, Jeevan Karekoppa Suresh, Sumit Malik	3:20.12	
	1	5	South Africa	Taariq Solomons, Pieter Conradie, Bernardus Pretorius, Ruan Greyling	DQ	
	2	8	Nigeria		DNS	

=== Final ===
Rank	Lane	Nation	Athletes	Time	Notes
1st place, gold medalist(s)	6	United States	Quincy Downing, Aldrich Bailey, Chidi Okezie, Arman Hall	3:03.99	WJL
2nd place, silver medalist(s)	5	Poland	Karol Zalewski, Rafał Smoleń, Piotr Kuśnierz, Patryk Dobek	3:05.05	NJ
3rd place, bronze medalist(s)	4	Trinidad and Tobago	Asa Guevara, Jereem Richards, Brandon Benjamin, Machel Cedenio	3:06.32	
4	2	Australia	Jarryd Buchan, Jay Meaney, Max Waldron, Steven Solomon	3:06.58	SB
5	3	Jamaica	Shavon Barnes, Javon Francis, Lennox Williams, Jermaine Fyffe	3:07.31	SB
6	8	Saudi Arabia	Ibrahim Mohammed Saleh, Abdullah Ahmed Abkar, Bandar Atiyah Kaabi, Basheer Atiah Al Barakati	3:09.26	
7	9	Japan	Naohiro Yokoyama, Kenta Kimura, Shota Kozuma, Kazushi Kimura	3:09.67	
	7	Italy	Vito Incantalupo, Marco Lorenzi, Davide Re, Michele Tricca	DSQ	

== Participation ==
According to an unofficial count, 76 athletes from 18 countries participated in the event.

- Australia (4)
- Bahamas (4)
- Canada (4)
- Finland (4)
- Germany (4)
- Ghana (4)
- India (4)
- Italy (5)
- Jamaica (5)
- Japan (4)
- Norway (4)
- Poland (5)
- Russia (4)
- Saudi Arabia (4)
- South Africa (4)
- Spain (4)
- Trinidad and Tobago (4)
- United States (5)
