= Track and field at the 2011 Military World Games – Men's 4 × 400 metres relay =

The men's 4 × 400 metres relay event at the 2011 Military World Games was held on 22 and 23 July at the Estádio Olímpico João Havelange.

== Records ==
Prior to this competition, the existing world and CISM record were as follows:

World Record	United States (Andrew Valmon, Quincy Watts, Butch Reynolds, Michael Johnson)	2:54.29	Stuttgart, Germany	22 August 1993
CISM World Record	Poland (Marcin Jędrusiński, Piotr Rysiukiewicz, Jacek Bocian, Robert Maćkowiak)	3:02.78	Zagreb, Croatia	August 1999

== Schedule ==
Date	Time	Round
22 July 2011		Semifinals
23 July 2011	12:10	Final

== Medalists ==
Gold	Silver	Bronze
Poland; Piotr Klimczak; Daniel Dąbrowski; Kacper Kozłowski; Marcin Marciniszyn	Kenya; Kipkemboi Soi; Jonathan Kibet; Geoffrey Matum; Mark Mutai	India; Riju Kallammarukunnal; Premanand Jayakumar; Mortaja Shake; Kunhu Puthenpurakkal

== Results ==
=== Final ===
Rank	Lane	Nation	Name	Time	Notes
1st place, gold medalist(s)	3	Poland	Piotr Klimczak, Daniel Dąbrowski, Kacper Kozłowski, Marcin Marciniszyn	3:04.55	
2nd place, silver medalist(s)	5	Kenya	Kipkemboi Soi, Jonathan Kibet, Geoffrey Matum, Mark Mutai	3:07.87	
3rd place, bronze medalist(s)	8	India	Riju Kallammarukunnal, Premanand Jayakumar, Mortaja Shake, Kunhu Puthenpurakkal	3:08.31	
4	6	Algeria	Ali Tini, Houcine Lemmalda, Elarbi Laroui, Miloud Rahmani	3:08.36	
5	1	Trinidad and Tobago	David Damont, Jonathan James, Deverne Charles, Roberts Quiney	3:10.65	
6	2	Jamaica	Aaron Bleary, Claon Hall, Miguel Barton, Marlon Robinson	3:10.87	
7	7	Colombia	William Vera, Andres Martinez, Omar Estrada Hernandez, Jhon Sinisterra Mota	3:13.47	
	4	Saudi Arabia	Ismail Al-Sabiani, Mohammed Al-Bishi, Hamed Al-Bishi, Mohammed Abdulaziz	DNF	
