= Chen Chieh =

Taiwanese hurdler (born 1992)

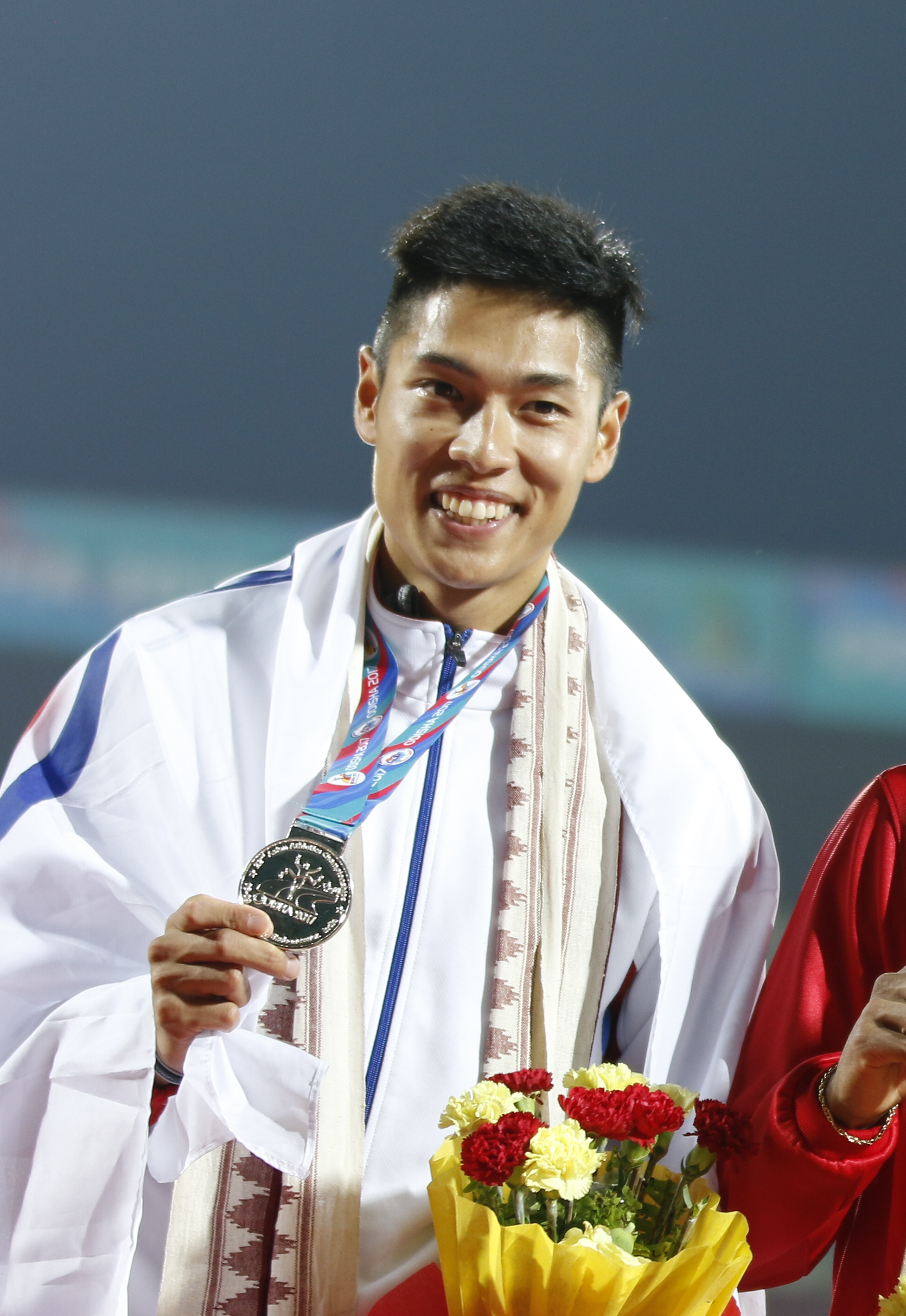

Personal information
- Born: May 8, 1992 (age 34)
- Height: 1.81 m (5 ft 11 in)
- Weight: 65 kg (143 lb)

Sport
- Country: Chinese Taipei
- Sport: Athletics
- Event: 400m Hurdles

Chen Chieh (Chinese: 陳傑, born May 8, 1992, in Taichung) is a Taiwanese athlete specializing in the 400 meters hurdles. He represented his country at the 2012 Summer Olympics and the 2016 Summer Olympics without reaching the semifinals.

His personal best in the event is 48.92 seconds, set in Doha in 2019.

== Competition record ==
Year	Competition	Venue	Position	Event	Notes
Representing Chinese Taipei
2009	East Asian Games	Hong Kong, China	5th	400 m hurdles	52.98
2009	East Asian Games	Hong Kong, China	3rd	4 × 400 m relay	3:10.47
2010	Asian Junior Championships	Hanoi, Vietnam	2nd	400 m hurdles	51.13
2010	Asian Junior Championships	Hanoi, Vietnam	4th	4 × 100 m relay	40.99
2010	World Junior Championships	Moncton, Canada	19th (sf)	400 m hurdles	52.98
2011	Universiade	Shenzhen, China	20th (sf)	400 m hurdles	51.49
2012	Asian Indoor Championships	Hangzhou, China	8th (h)	400 m	49.88
2012	Olympic Games	London, United Kingdom	33rd (h)	400 m hurdles	50.27
2013	Asian Championships	Pune, India	5th	400 m hurdles	50.86
2013	East Asian Games	Tianjin, China	2nd	400 m hurdles	49.90
2013	East Asian Games	Tianjin, China	3rd	4 × 400 m relay	3:10.72
2014	Asian Games	Incheon, South Korea	5th	400 m hurdles	51.10
2015	Asian Championships	Wuhan, China	2nd	400 m hurdles	49.68
2015	Universiade	Gwangju, South Korea	6th	400 m hurdles	50.22
2016	Olympic Games	Rio de Janeiro, Brazil	41st (h)	400 m hurdles	50.65
2017	Asian Championships	Bhubaneswar, India	2nd	400 m hurdles	49.75
2017	Asian Championships	Bhubaneswar, India	4th	4 × 400 m relay	3:06.51
2017	Universiade	Taipei, Taiwan	2nd	400 m hurdles	49.05
2017	Universiade	Taipei, Taiwan	1st (h)	4 × 400 m relay	3:07.35^{1}
2018	Asian Games	Jakarta, Indonesia	4th	400 m hurdles	49.62
2018	Asian Games	Jakarta, Indonesia	10th (h)	4 × 400 m relay	3:08.76
2019	Asian Championships	Doha, Qatar	2nd	400 m hurdles	48.92
2019	World Championships	Doha, Qatar	20th (sf)	400 m hurdles	50.00
2021	Olympic Games	Tokyo, Japan	34th (h)	400 m hurdles	50.96
2022	World Championships	Eugene, United States	27th (h)	400 m hurdles	50.28
2023	Asian Championships	Bangkok, Thailand	10th (sf)	400 m hurdles	50.19
2023	Asian Games	Hangzhou, China	12th (h)	400 m hurdles	50.85

^{1}Disqualified in the final
