= Track and field at the 2015 Military World Games – Men's 400 metres hurdles =

The men's 400 metres hurdles event at the 2015 Military World Games was held on 4 and 6 October at the KAFAC Sports Complex.

== Records ==
Prior to this competition, the existing world and CISM record were as follows:

| World Record | Kevin Young (USA) | 46.78 | Barcelona, Spain | 6 August 1992 |
| CISM World Record | Thomas Goller (GER) | 48.75 | Zagreb, Croatia | August 1999 |

== Schedule ==
| Date | Time | Round |
|---|---|---|
| 4 October 2015 | 15:05 | Round 1 |
| 6 October 2015 | 15:20 | Final |

== Medalists ==
| Gold | Silver | Bronze |
|---|---|---|
| Abdelmalik Lahoulou; Algeria | Timofey Chalyy; Russia | Boniface Mucheru Tumuti; Kenya |

== Results ==
=== Round 1 ===
Qualification: First 2 in each heat (Q) and next 2 fastest (q) qualified for the final.

| Rank | Heat | Name | Nationality | Time | Notes |
|---|---|---|---|---|---|
| 1 | 3 | William Mbevi Mutunga | Kenya | 50.37 | Q |
| 2 | 1 | Abdelmalik Lahoulou | Algeria | 50.38 | Q |
| 3 | 1 | Boniface Mucheru Tumuti | Kenya | 50.49 | Q |
| 4 | 3 | Ivan Shablyuev | Russia | 50.59 | Q |
| 5 | 1 | Durgesh Kumar Pal | India | 50.59 | q |
| 6 | 2 | Timofey Chalyy | Russia | 50.73 | Q |
| 7 | 2 | Ali Khamis | Bahrain | 51.12 | Q |
| 8 | 3 | Hederson Estefani | Brazil | 51.41 | q |
| 9 | 2 | Gamal Abdelnasir Abubaker | Qatar | 51.72 | |
| 10 | 2 | Juander Santos | Dominican Republic | 51.87 | |
| 11 | 1 | Víctor Solarte | Venezuela | 52.84 | |
| 12 | 1 | Andreas Ritz | Switzerland | 52.94 | |
| 13 | 3 | Leonardo Capotosti | Italy | 54.05 | |
| 14 | 2 | Vishnu Velammavukudily Sabu | India | 54.13 | |
| 15 | 3 | Alex Tourigny-Plante | Canada | 57.21 | |
| | 2 | Pethias Barclays Gondwe Mdoka | Malawi | DNF | |
| | 1 | Máximo Mercedes | Dominican Republic | DNF | |
| | 3 | Emmanuel Chimdzeka | Malawi | DNS | |

=== Final ===
| Rank | Lane | Name | Nationality | Time | Notes |
|---|---|---|---|---|---|
| 1st place, gold medalist(s) | 3 | Abdelmalik Lahoulou | Algeria | 49.43 | |
| 2nd place, silver medalist(s) | 4 | Timofey Chalyy | Russia | 49.88 | |
| 3rd place, bronze medalist(s) | 6 | Boniface Mucheru Tumuti | Kenya | 49.91 | |
| 4 | 8 | Ivan Shablyuev | Russia | 50.16 | |
| 5 | 1 | Durgesh Kumar Pal | India | 50.33 | |
| 6 | 7 | Ali Khamis | Bahrain | 50.94 | |
| 7 | 2 | Hederson Estefani | Brazil | 51.69 | |
| 8 | 5 | William Mbevi Mutunga | Kenya | 1:22.70 | |
