= Yuta Konishi =

Japanese hurdler (born 1990)

Personal information
- Nationality: Japanese
- Born: 31 July 1990 (age 35) Hirakata, Japan
- Education: Ritsumeikan University
- Height: 1.82 m (6 ft 0 in)
- Weight: 72 kg (159 lb)

Sport
- Country: Japan
- Sport: Track and field
- Event: 400 metres hurdles
- Club: Sumitomo Electric Athletics Club
- Personal best: 49.03 (Osaka 2017)
Medal record
Men's athletics
Representing Japan
Asian Championships
Gold medal – first place	2015 Wuhan	400 m hurdles

Yuta Konishi (小西 勇太, Konishi Yūta; born 31 July 1990) is a Japanese hurdler. He competed in the 400 metres hurdles event at the 2015 World Championships in Beijing without qualifying for the semifinals. Earlier that year he won the gold medal at the 2015 Asian Championships. His personal best in the 400 metres hurdles is 49.41 seconds set in Osaka in 2011.

== Personal best ==
Event	Time (s)	Competition	Venue	Date
400 m hurdles	49.03	Japanese Championships	Osaka, Japan	23 June 2017

== Competition record ==
Year	Competition	Venue	Position	Event	Notes
Representing Japan
2015	Asian Championships	Wuhan, China	1st	400 m hurdles	49.58
2015	World Championships	Beijing, China	28th (h)	400 m hurdles	49.58
2017	Asian Championships	Bhubaneswar, India	8th	400 m hurdles	51.72
