= 2017 Asian Athletics Championships – Men's 400 metres hurdles =

The men's 400 metres hurdles at the 2017 Asian Athletics Championships was held on 7 and 8 July.

== Medalists ==
| Gold | Eric Cray; Philippines |
| Silver | Chen Chieh; Chinese Taipei |
| Bronze | M.P. Jabir; India |

== Results ==
=== Heats ===
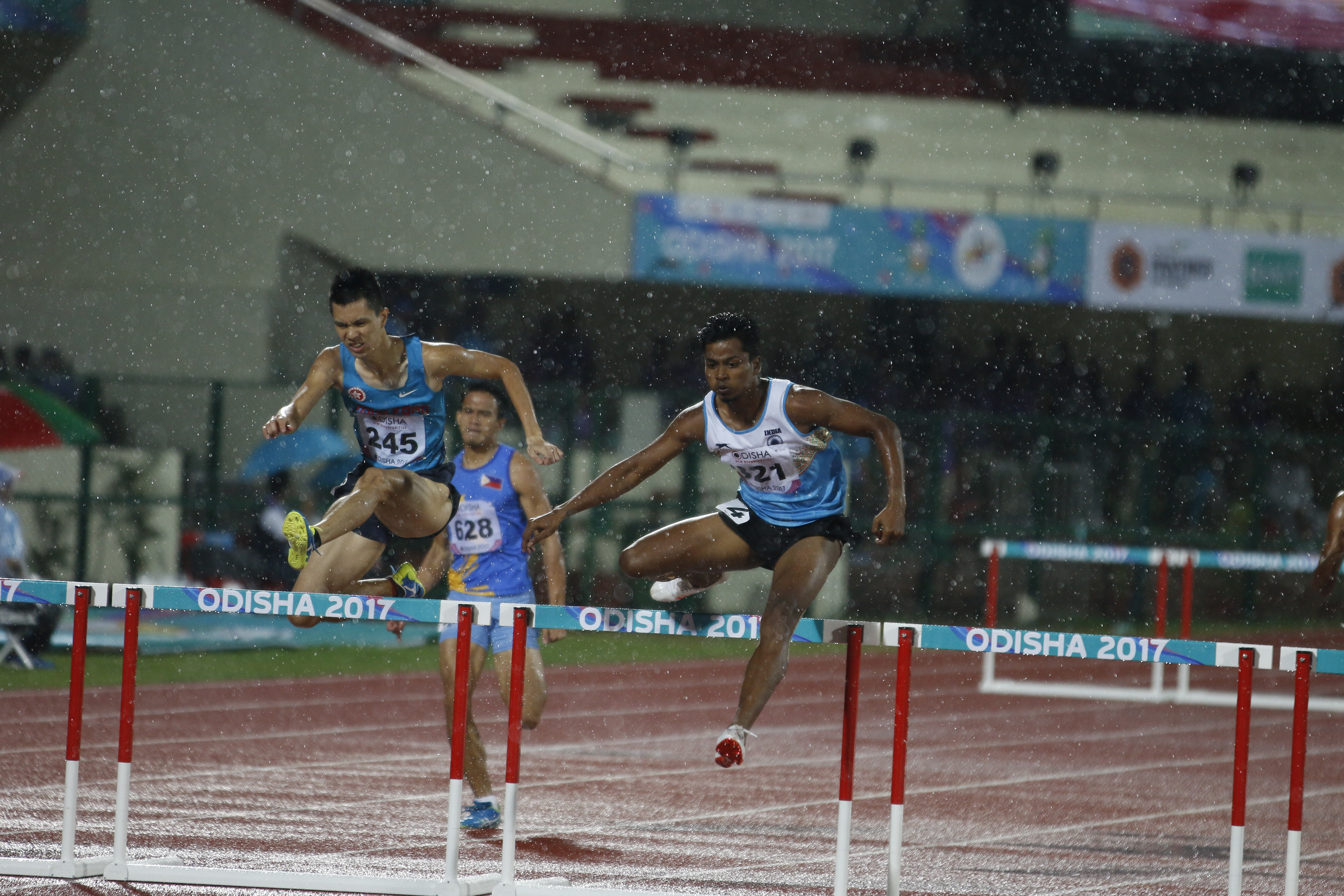
Heat 3

Qualification rule: First 2 in each heat (Q) and the next 2 fastest (q) qualified for the final.

| Rank | Heat | Name | Nationality | Time | Notes |
|---|---|---|---|---|---|
| 1 | 1 | Chen Chieh | Chinese Taipei | 50.64 | Q |
| 2 | 2 | Eric Cray | Philippines | 50.85 | Q |
| 3 | 1 | Youssef Karam Taher | Kuwait | 50.90 | Q |
| 4 | 3 | Yu Chia-hsuan | Chinese Taipei | 50.98 | Q |
| 5 | 1 | Dmitriy Koblov | Kazakhstan | 50.99 | q |
| 6 | 2 | M.P. Jabir | India | 51.06 | Q |
| 7 | 1 | Yuta Konishi | Japan | 51.43 | q |
| 8 | 3 | Santhosh Kumar Tamilarasan | India | 51.59 | Q |
| 9 | 3 | Chan Ka Chun | Hong Kong | 51.60 | |
| 10 | 3 | Mohammed Jasim | Iraq | 51.75 | |
| 11 | 2 | Abdullah Rizqallah Mulayhi | Saudi Arabia | 52.05 | |
| 12 | 1 | Durgesh Kumar Pal | India | 52.47 | |
| 13 | 2 | Hwang Hye-onu | South Korea | 52.52 | |
| 14 | 3 | Mehboob Ali | Pakistan | 52.61 | |
| 15 | 3 | Francis Medina | Philippines | 53.34 | |
| 16 | 2 | Alisher Pulotov | Tajikistan | 53.57 | |
| 17 | 2 | Igor Kondratyev | Kazakhstan | 53.61 | |
| 18 | 2 | Jassem Waleed Al-Mas | Kuwait | 53.88 | |
| 19 | 3 | Azizdzhon Abdullaev | Tajikistan | 54.87 | |
| 20 | 1 | Alamgir Hossain | Bangladesh | 56.16 | |

=== Final ===
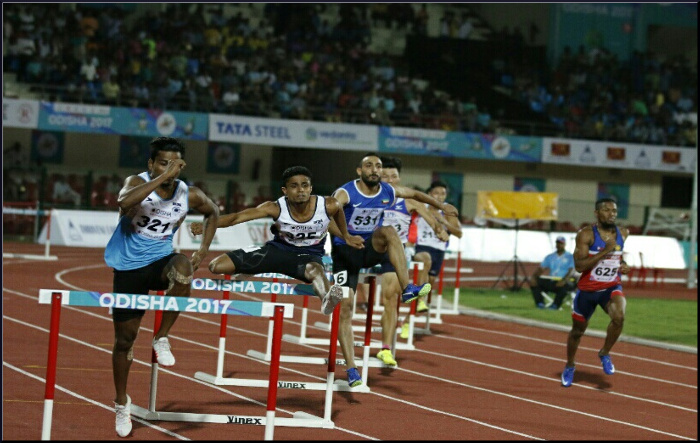
The final

| Rank | Lane | Name | Nationality | Time | Notes |
|---|---|---|---|---|---|
| 1st place, gold medalist(s) | 4 | Eric Cray | Philippines | 49.57 | |
| 2nd place, silver medalist(s) | 3 | Chen Chieh | Chinese Taipei | 49.75 | |
| 3rd place, bronze medalist(s) | 7 | M.P. Jabir | India | 50.22 | |
| 4 | 2 | Dmitriy Koblov | Kazakhstan | 50.30 | |
| 5 | 5 | Yu Chia-hsuan | Chinese Taipei | 50.90 | |
| 6 | 8 | Santhosh Kumar Tamilarasan | India | 50.95 | |
| 7 | 6 | Youssef Karam Taher | Kuwait | 51.36 | |
| 8 | 1 | Yuta Konishi | Japan | 51.72 | |
