= 2014 Arab Junior Athletics Championships =

16th Arab Junior Athletics Championships
- Dates: 23–26 April
- Host city: Cairo, Egypt
- Events: 44

The 2014 Arab Junior Athletics Championships was the sixteenth edition of the international athletics competition for under-20 athletes from Arab countries. It took place between 23 and 26 April in Cairo, Egypt. It was the fifth time that the Egyptian capital hosted the event. A total of 44 athletics events were contested, 22 for men and 22 for women.

The host nation Egypt comfortably topped the medal table with seventeen gold medals and 47 in total. Bahrain was the next most successful country with 14 golds among its 28 medals. Algeria was a distant third with 19 medals, but only three gold.

The competition saw successful runs by Kenyan-born athletes for Bahrain, including the reigning senior Asian steeplechase champion Ruth Jebet and Asian runner-up in the 400 m, Ali Khamis Abbas, who won a 400 m hurdles and flat double in Cairo. Three other athletes achieved double at the tournament: Salwa Eid Naser won the women's 200 metres and 400 metres, her Bahraini compatriot Makonine Dissa Djissa won the women's middle-distance double, and Egypt's Esraa Mohamed Samir won the women's horizontal jumps.

== Medal summary ==
=== Men ===
Event	Gold		Silver		Bronze	
100 metres	Meshaal Khalifa (KUW)	10.61	Mahmoud Hammoudi (ALG)	10.62	Sayed Khalfan (OMN)	10.96
200 metres	Abbas Abubacar (BHR)	21.56	Mahmoud Hammoudi (ALG)	21.77	Meshaal Khalifa (KUW)	21.82
400 metres	Ali Khamis Abbas (BHR)	46.15	Abbas Abubacar (BHR)	46.42	Mohamed Mustafa Kamel (EGY)	48.28
800 metres	Ali Abdi (BHR)	1:50.57	Fathi Ahmad Adam (SUD)	1:50.63	Mustafa Atouan (IRQ)	1:50.90
1500 metres	Muhieddine Abdi (DJI)	3:54.89	Youssef Boulekdam (ALG)	3:57.83	Abdelhak Assaadi (ALG)	3:58.21
5000 metres	Ramadhan Fawzi Mohamed (DJI)	14:29.61	Abdi Ibrahim Abdou (BHR)	14:29.84	Derara Disalaven (BHR)	14:31.77
10,000 metres	Abdi Ibrahim Abdou (BHR)	29:54.32	Adan Arbah (DJI)	30:45.48	Mustafa Shaghmim (EGY)	31:41.52
100 m hurdles	Mahdi Abdallah Al-Othmani (KSA)	15.11	Omar Tarik Salaheddine (EGY)	15.17	Ahmed Ali (IRQ)	15.41
400 m hurdles	Ali Khamis Abbas (BHR)	51.42	Sid Ali Khadim (ALG)	52.91	Idriss Adel Essefifani (KSA)	53.23
3000 m steeplechase	Evans Royo (BHR)	8:54.09	Ali Saoudi (ALG)	9:24.00	Saddam Hussein Mohamed (YEM)	9:32.08
4 × 100 m relay	Oman (OMN)	41.5	Saudi Arabia (KSA)	41.6	Egypt (EGY)	42.1
4 × 400 m relay	Bahrain (BHR)	3:15.05	Sudan (SUD)	3:16.17	Egypt (EGY)	3:18.29
10 km walk	Islam Abdel-Tawwab (EGY)	43:19.91	Mahmoud Majd Mahmoud (EGY)	44:12.65	Abdessamiaâ Saïdani (ALG)	44:28.95
High jump	Ali Alouan Hassan (IRQ)	1.99 m	Mohamed Yasser Mohamed (EGY)	1.99 m	Rashed Khamis Mubarak (BHR)	1.99 m
Pole vault	Hussein Assim Al-Hazzam (KSA)	5.32 m CR	Ali Mohsen (IRQ)	4.60 m	Abderrahmane Hamdy Ibrahim (EGY)	4.30 m
Long jump	Mustafa Mohamed Ezzouri (KSA)	7.30 m	Mohamed Tarik Essayed (EGY)	7.05 m	Mubarak Adel Guemir (KUW)	7.02 m
Triple jump	Khalid Sayed Essebiî (KUW)	15.31 m	Bassem Mohamed Yahia (EGY)	14.41 m	Shaker Mahmoud (IRQ)	14.35 m
Shot put	Mustafa Amrou Ahmed (EGY)	21.79 m	Ahmed Sharif Adel (EGY)	19.63 m	Mustafa Kadhim Daher (IRQ)	16.68 m
Discus throw	Mustafa Kadhem (IRQ)	59.52 m CR	Ahmed Sharif Adel (EGY)	55.45 m	Youssef Mohamed Farouk (EGY)	52.66m
Hammer throw	Ahmed Tariq Ismail (EGY)	71.02 m	Hussein Thamer Abdelwahed (IRQ)	61.76 m	Karim Sobhi Abdelkarim (EGY)	61.61 m
Javelin throw	Majed Muhsen Albadri (EGY)	69.44 m	Muhieddine El-Taghdi (LBA)	66.87 m	Ali Aissa Abdelghani (KSA)	66.19 m
Decathlon	Mustafa Mohamed Ramadhan (EGY)	6747 pts	Ahmed Badiaa Ahmed (EGY)	5582 pts	Moâtaz Iskandar (OMN)	5557 pts

=== Women ===
Event	Gold		Silver		Bronze	
100 metres	Basant Mohamed Awad (EGY)	12.13	Hajar Saad Al-Amri (BHR)	12.37	Echrak Rahmouni (ALG)	12.44
200 metres	Salwa Eid Naser (BHR)	24.61	Basant Mohamed Awad (EGY)	25.21	Hajar Saad Al-Amri (BHR)	25.52
400 metres	Salwa Eid Naser (BHR)	55.72	Dahiah Haddar (ALG)	56.30	Azza Ahmed Essayed (EGY)	1:01.48
800 metres	Makonine Dissa Djissa (BHR)	2:10.66	Ribitu Bouatiou Idao (BHR)	2:11.67	Sabrina Hassine (ALG)	2:15.00
1500 metres	Makonine Dissa Djissa (BHR)	4:21.54	Ribitu Bouatiou Idao (BHR)	4:22.44	Sabrina Hassine (ALG)	4:27.30
3000 metres	Ruth Jebet (BHR)	9:24.40	Jamila Kadou (BHR)	9:54.11	Zainab Hashem (IRQ)	11:20.57
5000 metres	Fatouma Jouarou (BHR)	16:51.00	Shouba Aman (BHR)	16:51.50	Zainab Hashem (IRQ)	19:46.59
100 metres hurdles	Lina Amrou Gaber (EGY)	14.15 CR	Dahiah Haddar (ALG)	14.50	Hamida Zitouna (ALG)	14.78
400 m hurdles	Dahieh Haddar (ALG)	59.16	Noureen Hassan Mahmoud (EGY)	1:02.78	Hadir Rahim (IRQ)	1:07.57
3000 m steeplechase	Ruth Jebet (BHR)	9:55.38	Rosemary Yomakato (BHR)	10:15.31	Hajar Sokhal (ALG)	11:07.61
4 × 100 m relay	Algeria (ALG)	48.29	Egypt (EGY)	48.81	Bahrain (BHR)	49.86
4 × 400 m relay	Algeria (ALG)	3:52.97	Egypt (EGY)	4:01.11	Lebanon (LIB)	4:29.72
10 km walk	Amira Zinhom (EGY)	53:54.00	May Ahmed Mohamed (EGY)	58:09.60	Sandy Karam (LIB)	59:02.21
High jump	Reham Hamdy Kamal (EGY)	1.70 m	Yousra Arar (ALG)	1.63 m	Yara Ashraf Adly (EGY)	1.60 m
Pole vault	Maryam Yasser Mohamed (EGY)	3.00 m	Sherine Sharif Mahmoud (EGY)	2.60 m	Zahra Jamal Sakran (IRQ)	2.60 m
Long jump	Esraa Mohamed Samir (EGY)	5.86 m	Salma Gamal Ahmed (EGY)	5.45 m	Lidia Sahraoui (ALG)	5.39 m
Triple jump	Esraa Mohamed Samir (EGY)	12.26 m	Salma Gamal Ahmed (EGY)	11.93 m	Shahd Kassem (IRQ)	10.90 m
Shot put	Hebat-Allah Mustafa Mohamed (EGY)	14.74 m CR	Nora Salem Jassem (BHR)	13.94 m	Amira Khalid Mahmoud (EGY)	12.54 m
Discus throw	Amira Khalid Mahmoud (EGY)	44.81 m	Nora Salem Jassem (BHR)	43.70 m	Fatma Khalid El-Adly (EGY)	41.35 m
Javelin throw	Saba Bassem Essehili (EGY)	45.37 m	Salma Mohsen Shamseddine (EGY)	39.24 m	Heba Al-Assimi (OMN)	33.32 m
Hammer throw	Esraa Mohamed Mustfa (EGY)	59.46 m CR	Nada Ayman Abu Alfutouh (EGY)	54.40 m	Safa Ahmed Shehab (IRQ)	36.49 m
Heptathlon	Houda Mohamed Atef (EGY)	4421 pts	Rawan Barouiz Bahader (EGY)	3447 pts	Heba Al-Assimi (OMN)	3258 pts

== Medal table ==
Rank	Nation	Gold	Silver	Bronze	Total
1	Egypt (EGY)	17	19	11	47
2	Bahrain (BHR)	14	10	4	28
3	Algeria (ALG)	3	8	8	19
4	Saudi Arabia (KSA)	3	1	2	6
5	Iraq (IRQ)	2	2	10	14
6	Djibouti (DJI)	2	1	0	3
7	Kuwait (KUW)	2	0	2	4
8	Oman (OMN)	1	0	4	5
9	Sudan (SUD)	0	2	0	2
10	Libya (LBA)	0	1	0	1
11	Lebanon (LIB)	0	0	2	2
12	Yemen (YEM)	0	0	1	1
Totals (12 entries)		44	44	44	132
