= Luis Charles =

Dominican Republic sprinter

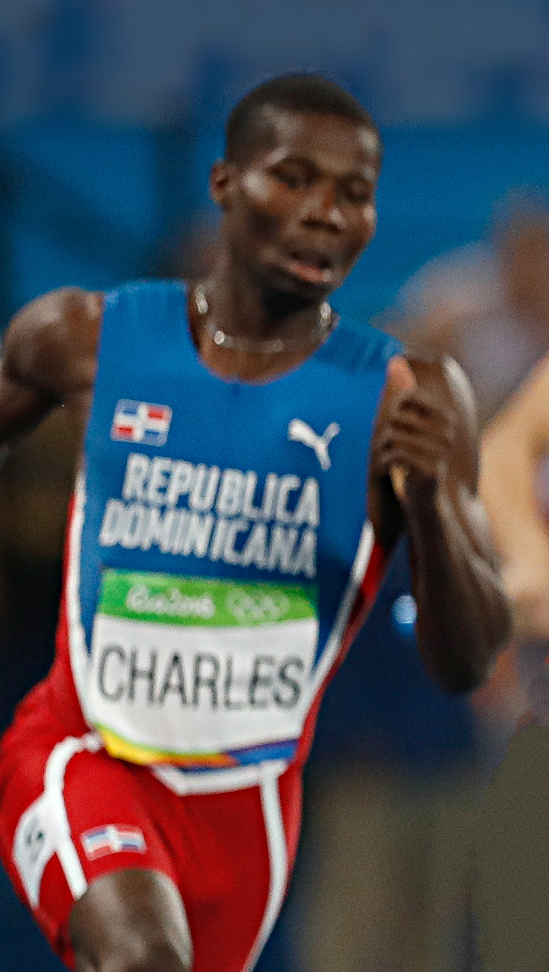
- Charles at the 2016 Olympics

Personal information
- Born: 3 December 1998 (age 27)
- Education: Autonomous University of Santo Domingo
- Height: 1.83 m (6 ft 0 in)
- Weight: 65 kg (143 lb)

Sport
- Sport: Athletics
- Event: 400 m

Achievements and titles
- Personal best: 400 m – 46.44 (2016)
Medal record
Representing Dominican Republic
Summer Universiade
Gold medal – first place	2017 Taipei	400 m

Luis Enrique Charles (born 3 December 1998) is a sprinter from the Dominican Republic. He competed in the 4 × 400 m relay at the 2016 Olympics, but failed to reach the final.

== International competitions ==
Year	Competition	Venue	Position	Event	Notes
Representing Dominican Republic
2015	World Youth Championships	Cali, Colombia	–	400 m	DQ
2016	Ibero-American Championships	Rio de Janeiro, Brazil	2nd	4 × 400 m relay	3:03.43
2016	World U20 Championships	Bydgoszcz, Poland	18th (sf)	400 m	47.33
2016	Olympic Games	Rio de Janeiro, Brazil	10th (h)	4 × 400 m relay	3:01.76
2017	World Relays	Nassau, Bahamas	–	4 × 400 m relay	DQ
2017	Pan American U20 Championships	Trujillo, Peru	9th (h)	400 m	47.61
2017	Universiade	Taipei, Taiwan	17th (sf)	400 m	47.33
2017	Universiade	Taipei, Taiwan	1st	4 × 400 m relay	3:04.34
2018	NACAC Championships	Toronto, Canada	7th	400 m	47.27
2019	Pan American Games	Lima, Peru	4th	4 × 400 m relay	3:05.64
