= Kazushi Kimura (athlete) =

Japanese sprinter (born 1993)

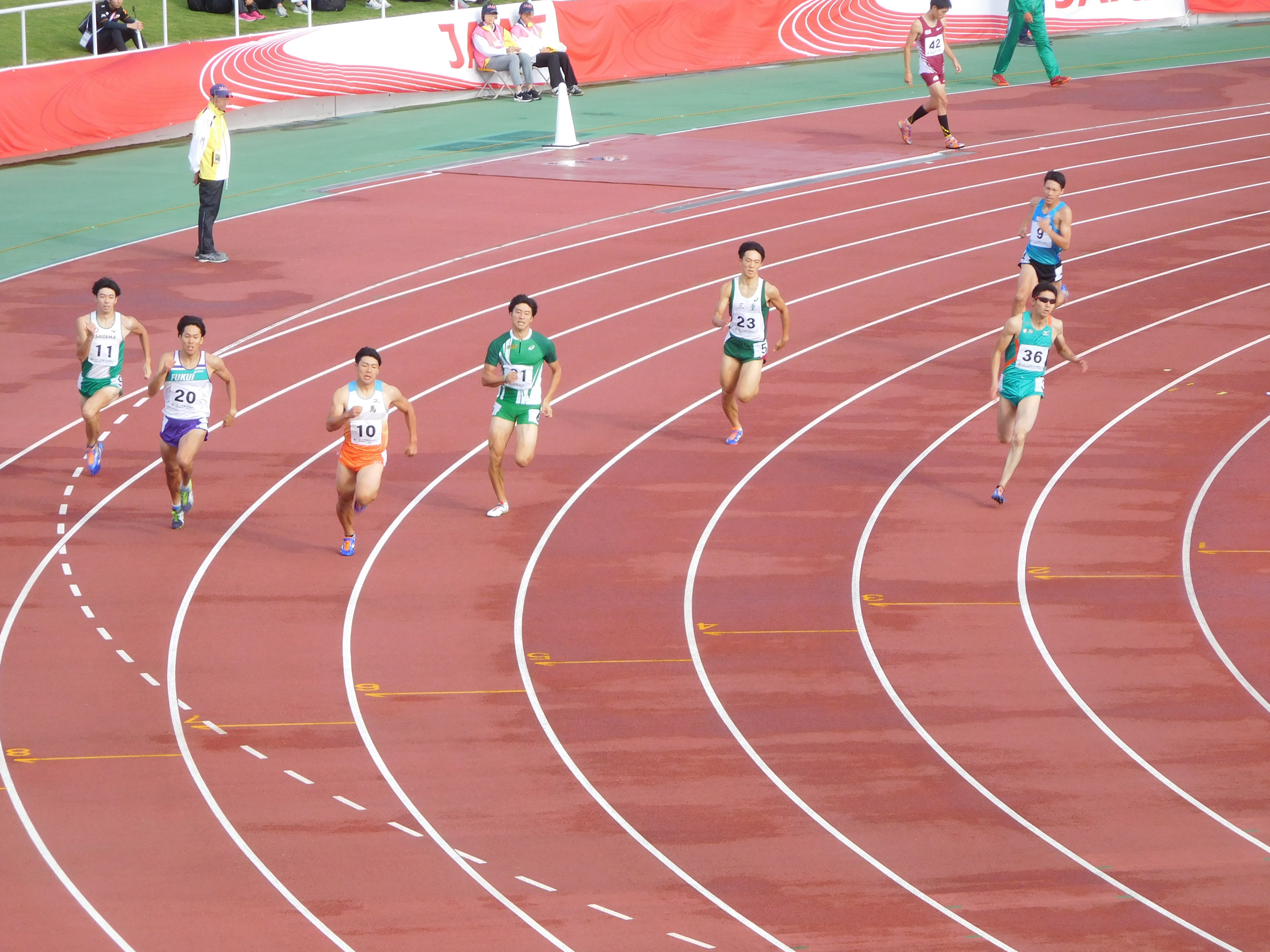
- Kimura (No.36) at the 2019 National Sports Festival

Personal information
- Nationality: Japanese
- Born: 17 January 1993 (age 33) Utazu, Kagawa, Japan
- Education: International Pacific University
- Height: 1.81 m (5 ft 11 in)
- Weight: 65 kg (143 lb)

Sport
- Country: Japan
- Sport: Track and field
- Event: 400 metres
- Team: Yondenko

Achievements and titles
- Personal best(s): 200 m: 20.85 (2017) 300 m: 32.85 (2019) 400 m: 45.53 (2017)
Medal record
Men's athletics
Representing Japan
Asian Junior Championships
Gold medal – first place	2012 Colombo	4×400 m relay
Silver medal – second place	2012 Colombo	400 m

Kazushi Kimura (木村 和史, Kimura Kazushi; born 17 January 1993 in Utazu, Kagawa) is a Japanese track and field sprinter who specialises in the 400 metres. His personal best in the event is 45.53 seconds set in Osaka in 2017. He competed in the 4 × 400 metres relay at the 2017 World Championships.

== Personal bests ==
Event	Time (s)	Competition	Venue	Date	Notes
200 m	20.85 (wind: -0.4 m/s)	Kansai Corporate Championships	Osaka, Japan	20 May 2017	
200 m	20.82 (wind: +2.2 m/s)	Chugoku-Shikoku University Championships	Izumo, Japan	18 May 2014	Wind-assisted
300 m	32.85	Naoto Tajima Memorial	Yamaguchi, Japan	20 October 2019	
400 m	45.53	National Championships	Osaka, Japan	23 June 2017	

== International competition ==
Year	Competition	Venue	Position	Event	Time
Representing Japan
2012	Asian Junior Championships	Colombo, Sri Lanka	2nd	400 m	47.53
2012	Asian Junior Championships	Colombo, Sri Lanka	1st	4×400 m relay	3:09.64 (relay leg: 4th)
2012	World Junior Championships	Barcelona, Spain	36th (h)	400 m	47.98
2012	World Junior Championships	Barcelona, Spain	7th	4×400 m relay	3:09.67 (relay leg: 4th)
2017	World Championships	London, United Kingdom	15th (h)	4×400 m relay	3:07.29 (relay leg: 3rd)
2017	DécaNation	Angers, France	2nd	4×400 m relay (Mixed)	3:27.88 (relay leg: 4th)

== National titles ==
Year	Competition	Venue	Event	Time	Notes
Representing International Pacific University
2012	National Junior Championships	Nagoya, Aichi	400 m	47.68	
2013	National University Individual Championships	Hiratsuka, kanagawa	400 m	46.67	GR
Representing Yondenko and Kagawa (National Sports Festival only)
2016	National Corporate Championships	Osaka, Osaka	400 m	46.81	
2019	National Corporate Championships	Osaka, Osaka	200 m	20.86 (wind: +1.9 m/s)	
2019	National Corporate Championships	Osaka, Osaka	400 m	45.96	
2019	National Sports Festival	Naka, Ibaraki	400 m	46.92	
