= Tatyana Yurchenko =

Kazakhstani middle-distance runner

Medal record

Women's athletics

Representing Kazakhstan

Asian Indoor Championships
Gold medal – first place	2014 Hangzhou	800 m
Gold medal – first place	2014 Hangzhou	4×400 m

Tatyana Yurchenko (Kazakh: Татьяна Юрченко; born 24 May 1993) is a Kazakhstani track and field athlete who competes in the 400 metres and 800 metres. She holds personal bests of 54.74 seconds and 2:08.90 minutes for the two events.

She represented her country at the 2009 Asian Youth Games and was fifth in the 1500 metres and fourth in the relay. She followed this with an 800 m bronze medal and 4×400 metres relay gold at the 2012 Asian Junior Athletics Championships. Yurchenko ran in the 800 m at the 2012 World Junior Championships in Athletics but injured herself in the heats and finished last.

Yurchenko claimed her first senior title at the 2014 Asian Indoor Athletics Championships, winning the 800 m gold in a personal indoor best time of 2:14.20 minutes.
