= Athletics at the 2018 Asian Games – Men's 4 × 400 metres relay =

Men's 4 × 400 metres relay at the 2018 Asian Games
- Venue: Gelora Bung Karno Stadium
- Date: 29–30 August 2018
- Competitors: 48 from 11 nations

Medalists
gold medal	Qatar; Abderrahman Samba, Mohamed Nasir Abbas, Mohamed El-Nour, Abdalelah Haroun
silver medal	India; Kunhu Muhammed, Dharun Ayyasamy, Muhammed Anas, Arokia Rajiv, K. S. Jeevan, Jithu Baby
bronze medal	Japan; Julian Walsh, Yuki Koike, Takatoshi Abe, Shota Iizuka, Jun Kimura, Sho Kawamoto

The men's 4 × 400 metres relay competition at the 2018 Asian Games took place on 29 and 30 August 2018 at the Gelora Bung Karno Stadium. Qatar won the gold medal for the first time in this event.

== Schedule ==
All times are Western Indonesia Time (UTC+07:00)

Date	Time	Event
Wednesday, 29 August 2018	19:50	Round 1
Thursday, 30 August 2018	20:40	Final

== Records ==
Prior to this competition, the existing world, Asian and Games records were as follows.

World Record	United States	2:54.29	Stuttgart, Germany	22 August 1993
Asian Record	Japan	3:00.76	Atlanta, United States	3 August 1996
Games Record	Japan	3:01.70	Bangkok, Thailand	19 December 1998

== Results ==
=== Round 1 ===
- Qualification: First 3 in each heat (Q) and the next 2 fastest (q) advance to the final.

==== Heat 1 ====
Rank	Team	Time	Notes
1	Japan (JPN); Jun Kimura; Sho Kawamoto; Takatoshi Abe; Julian Walsh	3:06.11	Q
2	India (IND); Kunhu Muhammed; K. S. Jeevan; Jithu Baby; Dharun Ayyasamy	3:06.48	Q
3	Iraq (IRQ); Yasir Ali; Ihab Jabbar; Ahmed Fadhil; Taha Hussein	3:06.92	Q
4	China (CHN); Wu Yuang; Cai Junqi; Lu Zhiquan; Yang Lei	3:06.98	q
5	Pakistan (PAK); Umar Sadat; Mazhar Ali; Muhammad Nadeem; Mehboob Ali	3:08.20	q

==== Heat 2 ====
Rank	Team	Time	Notes
1	Qatar (QAT); Abderrahman Samba; Mohamed Nasir Abbas; Mohamed El-Nour; Abdalelah Haroun	3:06.08	Q
2	Bahrain (BRN); Musa Isah; Ali Khamis; Abdulrahman Khamis; Abbas Abubakar Abbas	3:06.29	Q
3	Sri Lanka (SRI); Aruna Darshana; Ajith Premakumara; Pasindu Kodikara; Kalinga Kumarage	3:06.66	Q
4	Thailand (THA); Apisit Chamsri; Pipatporn Paungpi; Jirayu Pleenaram; Phitchaya Sunthonthuam	3:08.50	
5	Chinese Taipei (TPE); Yu Chia-hsuan; Chen Chieh; Yu Chen-yi; Yang Lung-hsiang	3:08.76	
6	Indonesia (INA); Umar Wira; Heru Astriyanto; Ifan Anugrah Setiawan; Andrian	3:14.01	

=== Final ===
Rank	Team	Time	Notes
1st place, gold medalist(s)	Qatar (QAT); Abderrahman Samba; Mohamed Nasir Abbas; Mohamed El-Nour; Abdalelah Haroun	3:00.56	AR
2nd place, silver medalist(s)	India (IND); Kunhu Muhammed; Dharun Ayyasamy; Muhammed Anas; Arokia Rajiv	3:01.85	
3rd place, bronze medalist(s)	Japan (JPN); Julian Walsh; Yuki Koike; Takatoshi Abe; Shota Iizuka	3:01.94	
4	Sri Lanka (SRI); Aruna Darshana; Ajith Premakumara; Pasindu Kodikara; Kalinga Kumarage	3:02.74	
5	Bahrain (BRN); Musa Isah; Ali Khamis; Abdulrahman Khamis; Abbas Abubakar Abbas	3:03.97	
6	China (CHN); Wu Yuang; Cai Junqi; Lu Zhiquan; Yang Lei	3:07.16	
7	Iraq (IRQ); Yasir Ali; Ihab Jabbar; Ahmed Fadhil; Taha Hussein	3:07.64	
8	Pakistan (PAK); Umar Sadat; Mazhar Ali; Muhammad Nadeem; Mehboob Ali	3:08.87	
