= Kazuya Watanabe =

Japanese sprinter

Personal information
- Nationality: Japanese
- Born: 20 July 1988 (age 37) Shibata, Miyagi, Japan
- Education: Tohoku Fukushi University
- Height: 1.70 m (5 ft 7 in)
- Weight: 61 kg (134 lb)

Sport
- Country: Japan
- Sport: Track and field
- Event: 400 metres

Achievements and titles
- Personal best(s): 100 m: 10.50 (Rifu 2015) 200 m: 21.24 (Kumamoto 2011) 400 m: 45.71 (Fukuroi 2013)
Medal record
Men's athletics
Representing Japan
Asian Championships
Silver medal – second place	2013 Pune	4×400 m relay

Kazuya Watanabe (渡邉 和也, Watanabe Kazuya; born 20 July 1988 in Shibata, Miyagi) is a Japanese track and field sprinter. He won a silver medal in the 4 × 400 metres relay at the 2013 Asian Championships.

== Personal bests ==
Event	Time (s)	Competition	Venue	Date	Notes
100 m	10.50 (wind: +0.8 m/s)	Miyagi Spring Athletics Championships	Rifu, Japan	25 April 2015	
200 m	21.24 (wind: +0.8 m/s)	National University Championships	Kumamoto, Japan	10 September 2011	
400 m	45.71 (Outdoor)	Shizuoka International Meet	Fukuroi, Japan	3 May 2013	
400 m	48.68 (Indoor)	Asian Indoor Championships	Hangzhou, China	15 February 2014	

== International competition ==
Year	Competition	Venue	Position	Event	Time
Representing Japan
2013	Asian Championships	Pune, India	12th (sf)	400 m	47.80
2013	Asian Championships	Pune, India	2nd	4×400 m relay	3:04.46 (relay leg: 3rd)
2014	Asian Indoor Championships	Hangzhou, China	5th	400 m	48.68 PB
2014	World Relays	Nassau, Bahamas	2nd (B)	4×400 m relay	3:03.24 (relay leg: 4th) SB
