= Athletics at the 2017 Summer Universiade – Men's 4 × 400 metres relay =

The men's 4 × 400 metres relay event at the 2017 Summer Universiade was held on 27 and 28 August at the Taipei Municipal Stadium.

== Medalists ==
Gold	Silver	Bronze
Dominican Republic (DOM); Juander Santos; Luis Charles; Andito Charles; Luguelín Santos; Kendris Díaz*	United States (USA); Amere Lattin; Curtis Brown; Jordan Clarke; Kahmari Montgomery	Czech Republic (CZE); Jan Tesař; Lukáš Hodboď; Filip Šnejdr; Vít Müller; Martin Juránek*

*Athletes who competed in heats only

== Results ==
=== Heats ===
Qualification: First 2 teams in each heat (Q) and the next 2 fastest (q) qualified for the final.

Rank	Heat	Nation	Athletes	Time	Notes
1	2	Chinese Taipei	Wang Wei-hsu, Yang Lung-hsiang, Yu Chen-yi, Chen Chieh	3:07.35	Q
2	1	Dominican Republic	Luis Charles, Andito Charles, Kendris Díaz, Luguelín Santos	3:07.98	Q
3	1	United States	Amere Lattin, Curtis Brown, Jordan Clarke, Kahmari Montgomery	3:08.28	Q
4	1	Canada	Benjamin Ayesu-Attah, Corey Bellemore, Gregory MacNeill, Nathaniel George	3:08.86	q
5	2	Czech Republic	Jan Tesař, Lukáš Hodboď, Martin Juránek, Vít Müller	3:08.88	Q
6	3	Switzerland	Dany Brand, Silvan Lutz, Alain-Herve Mfomkpa, Daniele Angelella	3:09.23	Q
7	2	Australia	Daniel Mowen, Taylor Burns, Harrison Roubin, Tristan Robinson	3:09.66	q
8	2	Algeria	Skander Djamil Athmani, Saber Boukmouche, Ramzi Abdenouz, Mohamed Islem Bekar	3:09.84	
9	1	Kazakhstan	Andrey Sokolov, Dmitriy Koblov, Igor Kondratyev, Mikhail Litvin	3:09.97	
10	3	India	Gokulakannan Mohan, Ravinder, Pankaj Malik, Amoj Jacob	3:10.68	Q, SB
11	2	Thailand	Apisit Chamsri, Nattapong Khanom, Jirayu Pleenaram, Nattapong Kongkraphan	3:10.98	
12	3	China	Yang Zeping, Zhou Guangcai, Li Runyu, Li Junlin	3:11.64	
13	3	South Korea	Lim Hyoung-bin, Hwang Hyeonu, Ko Seung-hwan, Lee Ji-woo	3:13.98	SB
14	3	Sri Lanka	Disanayaka Mudiyanselage, Vishvajith Gammahelage, Ishan Lahiru Olidurage, Wijesundara Mudiyanselage	3:14.59	
15	2	Brazil	Aliffer Junior dos Santos, Cleiton Abrão, Artur Terezan, Pedro da Palma Junior	3:15.27	
16	1	Saudi Arabia	Mohammed Mahnashi, Mazen Ahmed Masrahi, Mohammed Taleb Al-Shalati, Musaad Ahmed Bali	3:22.33	SB
17	3	Zambia	Charles Shimukowa, Edgar Silwimba, Obrey Chabala, Siyambango Siyoto	3:22.48	
	1	Poland	Dariusz Kowaluk, Michał Pietrzak, Andrzej Jaros, Rafał Omelko	DNF	
	1	Malaysia	Kwong Kar Jun, Anchois Aron, Kannathasan Subramaniam, Muhamad Firdaus Mazalan	DQ	R163.3a
	3	Oman	Usama Abdul Al-Gheilani, Ahmed Ali Al-Aamri, Mazin Khalifa Al-Subeihi, Othman Ali Al-Busaidi	DQ	R163.3a
	2	South Africa		DNS	

=== Final ===
Rank	Nation	Athletes	Time	Notes
1st place, gold medalist(s)	Dominican Republic	Juander Santos, Luis Charles, Andito Charles, Luguelín Santos	3:04.34	
2nd place, silver medalist(s)	United States	Amere Lattin, Curtis Brown, Jordan Clarke, Kahmari Montgomery	3:06.68	
3rd place, bronze medalist(s)	Czech Republic	Jan Tesař, Lukáš Hodboď, Filip Šnejdr, Vít Müller	3:08.14	
4	Australia	Daniel Mowen, Taylor Burns, Harrison Roubin, Tristan Robinson	3:09.21	SB
5	Switzerland	Dany Brand, Silvan Lutz, Alain-Herve Mfomkpa, Daniele Angelella	3:09.94	
6	Canada	Benjamin Ayesu-Attah, Corey Bellemore, Gregory MacNeill, Nathaniel George	3:11.09	
7	India	Gokulakannan Mohan, Ravinder, Pankaj Malik, Amoj Jacob	3:13.23	
	Chinese Taipei	Wang Wei-hsu, Yu Chen-yi, Yang Lung-hsiang, Chen Chieh	DQ	R170.19
