= 2015 Asian Athletics Championships – Men's 400 metres hurdles =

The men's 400 metres hurdles event at the 2015 Asian Athletics Championships was held on the 4 and 6 of June.

== Medalists ==
Gold	Yuta Konishi; Japan
Silver	Chen Chieh; Chinese Taipei
Bronze	Kazuaki Yoshida; Japan

== Results ==
=== Heats ===
First 3 in each heat (Q) and the next 2 fastest (q) qualified for the final.

Rank	Heat	Name	Nationality	Time	Notes
1	1	Chen Chieh	Chinese Taipei	49.89	Q
2	1	Kazuaki Yoshida	Japan	50.21	Q
3	2	Cheng Wen	China	50.47	Q
4	1	Jasem Waleed Al-Mas	Kuwait	50.81	Q
5	2	Yuta Konishi	Japan	51.03	Q
6	2	Dmitriy Koblov	Kazakhstan	51.10	Q
7	2	Chan Ka Chun	Hong Kong	51.13	q
8	1	Chen Ke	China	51.41	q
9	2	Haidar Al-Jumah	Saudi Arabia	51.82	
10	2	Durgesh Kumar Pal	India	51.96	
11	1	Artem Dyatlov	Uzbekistan	52.10	
12	2	Yang Xucong	China	52.14	
13	2	Yu Chia-Hsuan	Chinese Taipei	52.20	
14	1	Abdullah Mulayhi	Saudi Arabia	52.45	
15	1	Fung Kin Lok	Hong Kong	53.12	
16	1	Aleksei Namuratov	Kyrgyzstan	53.14	

=== Final ===
Rank	Lane	Name	Nationality	Result	Notes
1st place, gold medalist(s)	5	Yuta Konishi	Japan	49.58	
2nd place, silver medalist(s)	4	Chen Chieh	Chinese Taipei	49.68	
3rd place, bronze medalist(s)	3	Kazuaki Yoshida	Japan	49.95	
4	6	Cheng Wen	China	50.04	
5	7	Dmitriy Koblov	Kazakhstan	50.89	
6	2	Chan Ka Chun	Hong Kong	51.68	
7	1	Chen Ke	China	51.74	
	8	Jasem Waleed Al-Mas	Kuwait	DQ	R162.7
