= Quincy Downing =

American sprinter

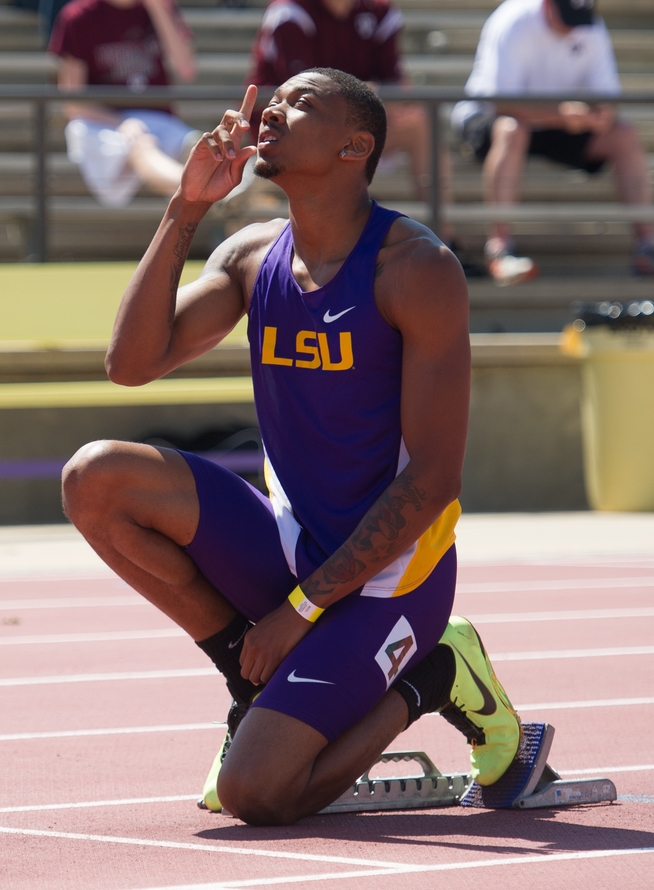
- Downing praying before a race

Personal information
- Nationality: American
- Born: 16 January 1993 (age 33)
- Home town: Cleveland, Ohio, U.S.
- Height: 185 cm (6 ft 1 in)
- Weight: 75 kg (165 lb)

Sport
- Sport: Athletics
- Event(s): 400 metres, 400 metres hurdles, 800 metres
- College team: LSU Tigers
- Club: Tiger Olympians

Achievements and titles
- Personal bests: 400m: 45.70 (2015); 400mH: 48.13 (2017); 800m: 1:49.70 i OT (2013)
Medal record
Men's athletics
Representing USA
World U20 Championships
Gold medal – first place	2012 Barcelona	4 × 400 m

Quincy Downing (born 16 January 1993) is an American sprinter, hurdler, and 800 metres runner. He was a part of the gold medal-winning 4 × 400 metres relay team at the 2012 World U20 Championships.

== Biography ==
Downing grew up in Cleveland, Ohio where he attended Glenville High School. His brothers are prominent NBA athlete and coach Jannero Pargo and NBA G League player Jeremy Pargo. Downing is also related to NBA player Dwayne Washington and New York Yankees player Al Downing.

As a prep, Downing was considered more of a middle-distance runner with a high school personal best of 1:51.99 in the 800 metres. He was a USATF youth champion in that event, and he competed at the 2009 World Youth Championships in Athletics in the 800 m but did not make the finals.

In college as a member of the LSU Tigers track and field team, Downing began to focus more on the 400 m and 400 m hurdles while still occasionally competing in the 800 m. In 2012, Downing won his first global gold medal at the 2012 World Junior Championships in the 4 × 400 m. Downing went on to win three NCAA 4 × 400 m relay national championship titles representing LSU, at the 2014 NCAA Division I Indoor Track and Field Championships and at the 2015 NCAA Division I Outdoor Track and Field Championships.

== Statistics ==
=== Personal bests ===
Event	Mark	Competition	Venue	Date
400 metres	45.70	Louisiana State Invitational	Baton Rouge, Louisiana	2 May 2015
400 metres hurdles	48.13	Racers Grand Prix	Kingston, Jamaica	10 June 2017
800 metres (indoors)	1:49.70	Alex Wilson Invitational	Notre Dame, Indiana	2 March 2013
