= M. P. Jabir =

Indian athlete

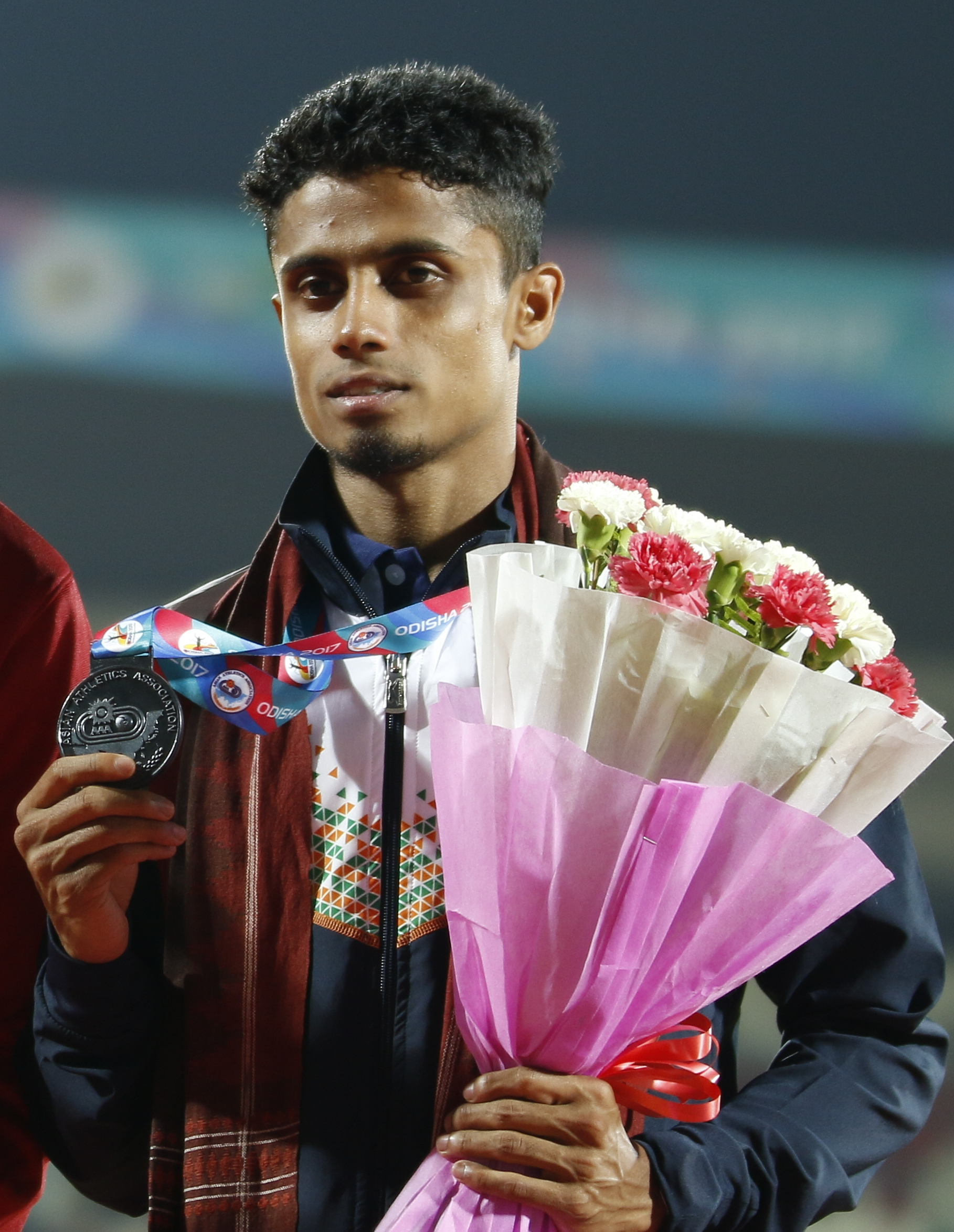
- Jabir with his 2017 Asian Athletics Championships bronze medal

Personal information
- Full name: Jabir Madari Palliyalil
- Born: 8 June 1996 (age 30) Manjeri, Kerala, India

Sport
- Sport: Track and field
- Event(s): 400 metres hurdles, 400 metres

Achievements and titles
- Personal best(s): 400 metres hurdles: 49.13 (Doha 2019); 400 metres: 46.96 (Mladá Boleslav 2019)
Medal record
Men's athletics
Representing India
Asian Championships
Bronze medal – third place	2017 Bhubaneswar	400 m hurdles
Bronze medal – third place	2019 Doha	400 m hurdles
South Asian Games
Gold medal – first place	2019 Kathmandu	400 m hurdles
Silver medal – second place	2019 Kathmandu	4 × 400 m relay
- Updated on 27 September 2019

Jabir Madari Palliyalil (born 8 June 1996), better known as M. P. Jabir, is an Indian athlete who specializes in 400 metres hurdles and 400 metres.

Jabir won the bronze medal at the 2017 Asian Athletics Championships in 400 metres hurdles with a timing of 50.22 seconds. At the same event in 2019 Asian Athletics Championships in Doha, he set his personal best timing of 49.13 to win bronze and achieved the qualification standard for 2019 World Athletics Championships.

Jabir became the first Indian male athlete to qualify for the 400m hurdles in Olympics, after earning qualification for the event in the 2020 Summer Olympics.

Jabir works for the Indian Navy and is posted at Kochi, as of 2017.
