= Mehboob Ali (athlete) =

Pakistani sprinter (born 1990)

Personal information
- Born: 14 January 1994 (age 32) Daska, Pakistan
- Height: 1.70 m (5 ft 7 in)
- Weight: 65 kg (143 lb)

Sport
- Country: Pakistan
- Sport: Athletics
- Events: 400 m hurdles, 400 m

Mehboob Ali (born 10 April 1990) is a Pakistani sprinter. He competed in the men's 400 metres at the 2016 Summer Olympics.

== International competitions ==
Year	Competition	Venue	Position	Event	Notes
Representing Pakistan
2016	South Asian Games	Guwahati, India	5th	400 m	47.72
2016	South Asian Games	Guwahati, India	3rd	400 m hurdles	52.04
2016	Olympic Games	Rio de Janeiro, Brazil	46th (h)	400 m	48.37
2017	Islamic Solidarity Games	Baku, Azerbaijan	4th	400 m hurdles	51.15
2017	Islamic Solidarity Games	Baku, Azerbaijan	2nd	4 × 400 m relay	3:07.62
2017	Asian Championships	Bhubaneswar, India	14th (h)	400 m hurdles	52.61
2017	Asian Championships	Bhubaneswar, India	7th	4 × 400 m relay	3:11.42
2017	World Championships	London, United Kingdom	34th (h)	400 m hurdles	52.24
2017	Asian Indoor and Martial Arts Games	Ashgabat, Turkmenistan	4th (h)	400 m	48.63^{1}
2017	Asian Indoor and Martial Arts Games	Ashgabat, Turkmenistan	1st	4 × 400 m relay	3:11.40
2018	Asian Games	Jakarta, Indonesia	12th (h)	400 m hurdles	51.27
2018	Asian Games	Jakarta, Indonesia	8th	4 × 400 m relay	3:08.87
2019	Asian Championships	Doha, Qatar	16th (sf)	400 m	47.61
2019	Asian Championships	Doha, Qatar	8th	400 m hurdles	50.94

^{1}Disqualified in the semifinals

== See also ==
- List of Pakistani records in athletics
- Athletics in Pakistan
- Pakistan at the Olympics
