= Kazuaki Yoshida =

Japanese hurdler

Personal information
- Nationality: Japanese
- Born: 31 August 1987 (age 38) Hyogo Prefecture, Japan
- Education: Juntendo University
- Height: 1.80 m (5 ft 11 in)
- Weight: 73 kg (161 lb)

Sport
- Country: Japan
- Sport: Track and field
- Event: 400 metres hurdles

Achievements and titles
- Personal best: 49.45 (Berlin 2009)
Medal record
Men's athletics
Representing Japan
Asian Championships
Bronze medal – third place	2015 Wuhan	400 m hurdles
Universiade
Silver medal – second place	2009 Belgrade	400 m hurdles
Bronze medal – third place	2009 Belgrade	4×400 m relay

Kazuaki Yoshida (吉田 和晃, Yoshida Kazuaki; born 31 August 1987 in Hyogo Prefecture) is a Japanese hurdler who specialises in the 400 metres hurdles. He competed at the 2009 World Championships reaching the semifinals.

== Personal best ==
Event	Time (s)	Competition	Venue	Date
400 m hurdles	49.45	World Championships	Berlin, Germany	15 August 2009

== International competition ==
Year	Competition	Venue	Position	Event	Time	Notes
Representing Japan
2009	Universiade	Belgrade, Serbia	2nd	400 m hurdles	49.78	SB
2009	Universiade	Belgrade, Serbia	3rd	4×400 m relay	3:06.46 (relay leg: 3rd)	
2009	World Championships	Berlin, Germany	16th (sf)	400 m hurdles	50.34	
2009	Asian Championships	Guangzhou, China	7th	400 m hurdles	51.91	
2015	Asian Championships	Wuhan, China	3rd	400 m hurdles	49.95	
