= Eric Cray =

Filipino-American track and field athlete

Eric Cray OLY
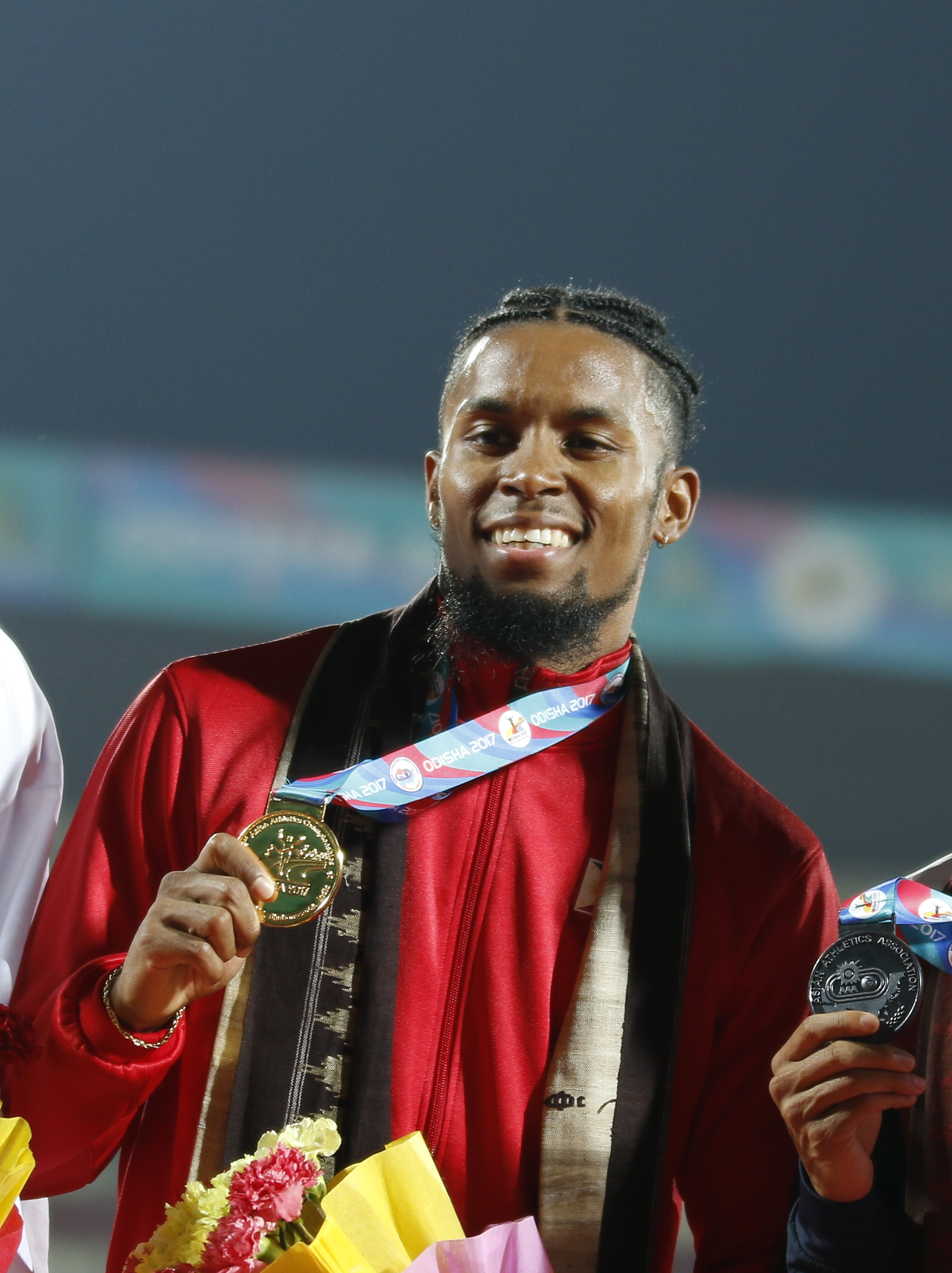
- Cray in 2017

Personal information
- Full name: Eric Shauwn Cray
- Nationality: Filipino/American
- Born: November 6, 1988 (age 37) Olongapo, Philippines
- Height: 5 ft 9 in (176 cm)
- Weight: 150 lb (70 kg)

Sport
- Country: Philippines
- Sport: Track and field
- Events: 400 metres hurdles 100 metres 60 metres
- Coached by: Keith Sharper (2014); Davian Clarke (2015)

Achievements and titles
- Personal bests: 100 m: 10.25 (2015, NR); 400 m hurdles: 48.98 (2016, NR)
Medal record
Men's athletics
Representing Philippines
Event	1st	2nd	3rd
Asian Athletics Championships	1	0	0
Asian Indoor Championships	0	0	1
Asian Indoor and Martial Arts Games	0	1	0
Southeast Asian Games	8	1	2
Total	9	2	3
Asian Athletics Championships
Gold medal – first place	2017 Buhbaneswar	Men's 400 m hurdles
Asian Indoor Championships
Bronze medal – third place	2016 Doha	Men's 60 m
Asian Indoor and Martial Arts Games
Silver medal – second place	2017 Ashgabat	Men's 60 m
Southeast Asian Games
Gold medal – first place	2013 Naypyidaw	400 m hurdles
Gold medal – first place	2015 Singapore	100 m
Gold medal – first place	2015 Singapore	400 m hurdles
Gold medal – first place	2017 Kuala Lumpur	400 m hurdles
Gold medal – first place	2019 Philippines	4×100 m mixed relay
Gold medal – first place	2019 Philippines	400 m hurdles
Gold medal – first place	2021 Vietnam	400 m hurdles
Gold medal – first place	2023 Cambodia	400 m hurdles
Silver medal – second place	2017 Kuala Lumpur	100 m
Bronze medal – third place	2017 Kuala Lumpur	4×100 m relay
Bronze medal – third place	2019 Philippines	4×100 m relay

Eric Shauwn Brazas Cray (born November 6, 1988) is a Filipino-American track and field athlete who competes in sprinting and hurdling events. He represented the Philippines at the 2013 World Championships in Athletics, competing in the hurdles. He won gold medals at the Southeast Asian Games in 2013, 2015, 2017, 2019, 2021 and 2023. Cray currently holds the Filipino national record for the 400 metres hurdles and 100 metres.

== Early life and education ==
Cray was born in Olongapo to Ellis Jr. and Maria Cray Fish, before moving to Sacramento, California. His mother is a Filipina caregiver working in the U.S., while his father is an American cab driver. He has three sisters. He studied at James Madison High School in San Antonio, Texas in the United States for his secondary education. He has a degree in education at Bethune–Cookman University and a master's degree in Human Relations at University of Oklahoma.

== Career ==
Cray took up track and field when he was still in high school, competing for the James Madison High School at the district, regional and state championships. He also competed for the Bethune-Cookman University at the NCAA of the United States.

He holds dual American-Filipino dual citizenship but decided to compete for the Philippines in December 2011 upon the request of his mother. The application to compete for the Philippines was approved in 2013 by the IAAF.

He set a new national record and games record in the 400 m hurdles while winning at the 2015 Southeast Asian Games, setting a time of 49.40 seconds. Cray managed to win a bronze at the 60 m event at the 2016 Asian Indoor Athletics Championships. While he only finished seventh in the 400 m hurdles semifinals at the 2016 Summer Olympics with a time of 49.37 seconds, which itself already broke his national and Southeast Asian Games record, he set a better record earlier during the Heat 4 qualifying event with a time of 49.05.

Cray won the gold medal at the 400 meter hurdles event at the 2017 Asian Athletics Championships clocking 49.57 seconds ending his country's 8 year gold drought in the continental tournament.

Cray took the silver in the 60m Dash at the 2017 Asian Indoor Games in Asghartan, Turkmenistan.

At the 2019 Southeast Asian Games, Cray had a poor opening to his campaign after he was disqualified in the 100 meter run after two false starts. However he redeemed himself after winning the gold medal in the 400 meter hurdles and helped clinch the gold for his country in the mixed-gender 4x100 relay event.

== Personal life ==
In 2015, Cray reportedly had a fiancé and two children. His sisters are involved in sports; two were track and field athletes and one is a basketball coach, and another is a licensed cosmetologist. He considers American sprinter Michael Johnson his hero in the sport.
