= Dmitriy Koblov =

Kazakhstani hurdler (born 1992)

Personal information
- Born: 30 November 1992 (age 33)
- Education: South Kazakhstan State University
- Height: 1.83 m (6 ft 0 in)
- Weight: 82 kg (181 lb)

Sport
- Sport: Athletics
- Event: 400 metres hurdles
Medal record
Men's athletics
Representing Kazakhstan
Asian Indoor Championships
Silver medal – second place	2018 Tehran	4×400 m

Dmitriy Koblov (Kazakh: Дмитрий Коблов; born 30 November 1992) is a Kazakhstani athlete competing in the 400 metres hurdles. He represented his country at the 2016 Summer Olympics without advancing from the first round.

His personal best in the event is 49.39 seconds set in Bishkek in 2016.

== International competitions ==
Year	Competition	Venue	Position	Event	Notes
Representing Kazakhstan
2009	World Youth Championships	Brixen, Italy	6th	400 m hurdles (84 cm)	52.55
2010	Asian Junior Championships	Hanoi, Vietnam	4th	400 m hurdles	51.30
2010	World Junior Championships	Moncton, Canada	40th (h)	400 m hurdles	54.31
2013	Universiade	Kazan, Russia	14th (sf)	400 m hurdles	53.60
2014	Asian Games	Incheon, South Korea	14th (h)	400 m hurdles	52.01
2015	Asian Championships	Wuhan, China	5th	400 m hurdles	50.89
2015	Universiade	Gwangju, South Korea	24th (h)	400 m hurdles	52.22^{1}
2016	Olympic Games	Rio de Janeiro, Brazil	33rd (h)	400 m hurdles	49.87
2017	Asian Championships	Bhubaneswar, India	4th	400 m hurdles	50.30
2017	Asian Championships	Bhubaneswar, India	8th	4 × 400 m relay	3:11.49
2017	Universiade	Taipei, Taiwan	12th (sf)	400 m hurdles	50.84
2017	Universiade	Taipei, Taiwan	9th (h)	4 × 400 m relay	3:09.97
2018	Asian Games	Jakarta, Indonesia	6th	400 m hurdles	50.60
2019	Asian Championships	Doha, Qatar	13th (h)	400 m hurdles	51.39
2023	Asian Championships	Bangkok, Thailand	12th (sf)	400 m hurdles	50.81
2023	Asian Championships	Bangkok, Thailand	9th (h)	4 × 400 m relay	3:11.70
2023	Asian Games	Hangzhou, China	16th (h)	400 m hurdles	51.13
2025	Asian Championships	Gumi, South Korea	–	400 m hurdles	DQ

^{1}Did not finish in the semifinals
