= 2012 Asian Junior Athletics Championships =

- Dates: 9 – 12 June
- Host city: Colombo, Sri Lanka
- Venue: Sugathadasa Stadium
- Level: Junior (under-20)
- Events: 44
- Participation: 25 nations
- Records set: 7 Championship records

The 2012 Asian Junior Athletics Championships was the 15th edition of the international athletics competition for Asian under-20 athletes, organised by the Asian Athletics Association. It took place from 9 to 12 June at the Sugathadasa Stadium in Colombo, Sri Lanka – the same venue hosted the 2002 Asian Athletics Championships. Thirty-four nations took part in the event and over five hundred athletes participated. A total of 44 events were contested, with the events being evenly split between the genders.

The Chinese team topped the medal table with fifteen gold medals and a total of 23 medals. Chinese Taipei (Republic of China) had the second greatest number of event wins with six gold medals out of fifteen medals, while Japan had the second greatest haul with a total of 22 medals. India, Thailand and Qatar each won four gold medals and the hosts Sri Lanka won six medals during the four-day competition. Eighteen nations reached the medal table.

Qatar's Ashraf Amgad Elseify gave the stand-out performance of the championships with his Asian junior record in the men's hammer throw. Six other championship records were broken: Chinese pole vaulters Zhang Wei and Xu Huiqin bettered the men's and women's standards, Japan's Haruka Kyuma ran a 5000 m women's record, and Li Ting-Yu representing Chinese Taipei improved the women's steeplechase record. The two other records were set by Hamza Driouch and Teng Haining, who were the top two in the men's middle-distance events – Teng took the 800 metres while Driouch won the 1500 metres. Two athletes completed event doubles: Chen Mudan won both the women's horizontal jumps and Rahul Kumar Pal of India took both the men's long-distance events. Muamer Aissa Barshim of Qatar succeeded his brother, Mutaz Essa Barshim, as the Asian junior high jump champion.

== Medal summary ==
=== Men ===
Event	Gold		Silver		Bronze	
100 metres (wind: −2.3 m/s)	Hassan Taftian; Iran	10.49	Xie Zhenye; China	10.54	Yousef Ali Al-Shalani; Saudi Arabia	10.64
200 metres (wind: −3.9 m/s)	Xie Zhenye; China	21.15	Kenta Kimura; Japan	21.53	Hassan Taftian; Iran	21.60
400 metres	RA Dulaj Madusanka; Sri Lanka	47.36	Kimura Kazushi; Japan	47.53	Bandar Atiyah Al-Kaabi; Saudi Arabia	47.73
800 metres	Teng Haining; China	1:46.56 CR	Hamza Driouch; Qatar	1:46.72	Shota Kozuma; Japan	1:49.37
1500 metres	Hamza Driouch; Qatar	3:39.85 CR	Teng Haining; China	3:43.00	Jamal Al-Hayrani; Qatar	3:48.11
5000 metres	Rahul Kumar Pal; India	14:33.60	Kota Murayama; Japan	14:33.67	Keisuke Nakatani; Japan	14:58.23
10,000 metres	Rahul Kumar Pal; India	30:28.95	Kamino Daichi; Japan	31:22.10	Takahashi Soushi; Japan	31:54.63
110 metres hurdles (wind: −2.5 m/s)	Kongdee Kittipong; Thailand	13.86	Cheng Yun-Yin; Chinese Taipei	13.87	Supun Viraj Randeniya; Sri Lanka	13.94
400 metres hurdles	Ibrahim Mohamed Saleh; Saudi Arabia	51.20	Yuichi Nagano; Japan	51.32	Durgesh Kumar Pal; India	51.38
3000 metres steeplechase	Mohamed Hasim Salah; Qatar	9:04.65	Mohamad Al-Barakati; Saudi Arabia	9:15.81	Le Trong Giang; Vietnam	9:22.28
4×100 metres relay	Thailand (THA); Saran Sathoengram; Kritsada Namsuwan; Jirapong Meenapra; Ruttanapon Sowan	40.21	Japan (JPN); Kenta Naoki ? Takuya Satō; Naohiro Yokoyama	40.39	Hong Kong (HKG); Li Lut Yin; So Chun Hong; Fung Ling Ho; Ho Ping Kwan	40.67
4×400 metres relay	Japan (JPN); Takuya Satō; Kenta Kimura; Naohiro Yokoyama; Kazushi Kimura	3:09.64	Saudi Arabia (KSA); Ahmed Al-Khayri; Basheer Al-Barakati; Bandar Atiyah Kaabi; Ibrahim Saleh	3:10.63	Sri Lanka (SRI); Malith Rangana; Indunil Herath; Chamod Vuduranga; Dulaj Madusanka	3:11.12
10,000 m walk	Kuldeep; India	45:01.43	Daisuke Matsunaga; Japan	45:03.01	Zhang Zhi; China	45:05.27
High jump	Muamer Aissa Barshim; Qatar	2.16 m	Yuriy Dergachev; Kazakhstan	2.16 m	Hsiang Chun-Hsien; Chinese Taipei Subramaniam Navinraj; Malaysia	2.16 m
Pole vault	Zhang Wei; China	5.35 m CR	Fuji Daiki; Japan	4.80 m	Moho Fahme Zam-Zam; Malaysia	4.20 m
Long jump	Lin Qing; China	7.96 m	Tomoya Takamasa; Japan	7.68 m	Kumaravel Premkumar; India	7.52 m
Triple jump	Fu Haitao; China	16.38 m	Pratchaya Tepparak; Thailand	16.25 m	Mostafa Khosravi; Iran	15.31 m
Shot put	Li Meng; China	19.95 m	Mohammad Omer Abdul Qadri; Saudi Arabia	18.44 m	Wong Kai Yuen; Singapore	17.39 m
Discus throw	Mojtaba Shabaneh; Iran	58.79 m	Arjun Kumar; India	56.61 m	Behnam Shiri; Iran	55.72 m
Hammer throw	Ashraf Amgad Elseify; Qatar	80.85 m AJR/CR	Sukhdev Singh; India	65.25 m	Alhenoal Mobarais; Kuwait	59.86 m
Javelin throw	Cheng Chao-Tsun; Chinese Taipei	74.68 m	Amir Hossein Hosseini; Iran	68.47 m	Ku Chia-Hao; Chinese Taipei	68.10 m
Decathlon	Mao Chi-Shun; Chinese Taipei	6252 pts	Majed Radhi al-Sayed; Kuwait	5957 pts	Jamaleddin Sanaei; Iran	5422 pts

=== Women ===
Event	Gold		Silver		Bronze	
100 metres (wind: −0.8 m/s)	Liao Ching-Hsien; Chinese Taipei	11.97	Lin Huijun; China	11.98	Pakdee Khanrutai; Thailand	12.17
200 metres (wind: −3.1 m/s)	Lin Huijun; China	24.69	Olga Andreyeva; Kazakhstan	25.05	Shanti Veronica Pereira; Singapore	25.09
400 metres	RM Shiwanthi Kumari Ratnayake; Sri Lanka	55.91	Priyanka Mondal; India	56.01	Olga Andreyeva; Kazakhstan	56.03
800 metres	Wu Limin; China	2:07.13	Mizuki Yamamoto; Japan	2:08.67	Tatyana Yurchenko; Kazakhstan	2:09.60
1500 metres	Wang Yanfei; China	4:23.95	Wu Limin; China	4:24.36	Saki Yoshimizu; Japan	4:26.76
3000 metres	Kotomi Takayama; Japan	9:27.79	Kim Hyr Gyeeg; North Korea	9:29.18	Wu Yufeng; China	9:31.22
5000 metres	Haruka Kyuma; Japan	16:07.74 CR	Moe Kyuma; Japan	16:08.17	Kim Hyr Gyeeg; North Korea	16:32.02
100 metres hurdles	Wang Dou; China	13.80	Hsieh Ching-Ju; Chinese Taipei	14.11	Lui Lai Yiu; Hong Kong	14.59
400 metres hurdles	Nguyen Thi Huyen; Vietnam	59.92	Marina Zaiko; Kazakhstan	60.00	Lo Pei-Lin; Chinese Taipei	61.45
3000 metres steeplechase	Li Ting-Yu; Chinese Taipei	10:44.94 CR	Mizuki Sado; Japan	10:45.07	RAC Jayamini; Sri Lanka	10:55.76
4×100 metres relay	Thailand (THA); Sanuma Tipkoed; Supawan Thipat; Khanrutai Pakdee; Chonlada Kirdbut	46.87	Indonesia (INA); Priscilia Angrenia; Niafatul Aini; Irene Alisjahbana; Imaniar Nurul	47.24	Chinese Taipei (TPE); Hung Pei-ning; Liao Ching-hsien; Lo Pei-lin; Hsieh Ching-ju	47.32
4×400 metres relay	Kazakhstan (KAZ); Marina Zayko; Tatyana Yurchenko; Yekaterina Yermak; Olga Andreyeva	3:43.49	Sri Lanka (SRI); B. M. S. K. Kumari; Nadeeshani Henderson; D. P. Hansani; Siwanthi Rathnayaka	3:46.76	India (IND); M. Arpitha; O. V. Revathy; Jyoti Rani; Priyanka Mondal	3:49.09
10,000 m walk	Lee Jeongeun; South Korea	49:04.60	Wang Yalan; China	50:01.15	Khushbir Kaur; India	50:39.40
High jump	Wu Meng-Chia; Chinese Taipei	1.79 m	HM Nimesha Siriwardane; Sri Lanka	1.79 m	Liu Xiao Yun; China	1.76 m
Pole vault	Xu Huiqin; China	4.25 m CR	Chuah Yu Tian; Malaysia	3.40 m	Liu Yu-Yao; Chinese Taipei	3.20 m
Long jump	Chen Mudan; China	6.18 m	Wu Meng-Chia; Chinese Taipei	6.02 m	Yuka Suda; Japan	6.00 m
Triple jump	Chen Mudan; China	13.67 m	Dilyara Abuova; Kazakhstan	13.35 m	Hung Pei-Ning; Chinese Taipei	13.01 m
Shot put	Lai Li-Chun; Chinese Taipei	14.25 m	Lee Mina; South Korea	14.12 m	Thongchao Sawitri; Thailand	13.98 m
Discus throw	Subenrat Insaeng; Thailand	54.08 m	Navjeet Kaur Dhillon; India	44.78 m	Jeong Ye-lim; South Korea	41.32 m
Hammer throw	Yan Ni; China	59.94 m	Park Seo-jin; South Korea	54.03 m	Misaki Fukushima; Japan	50.78 m
Javelin throw	Liu Shiying; China	53.02 m	Yumi Shimabukuro; Japan	49.64 m	Heo Hyo-jeng; South Korea	45.46 m
Heptathlon	Purnima Hembram; India	4979 pts	Sunisa Khotseemueang; Thailand	4902 pts	Nadezhda Kirnos; Kazakhstan	4585 pts

== Medal table ==
* Host nation (Sri Lanka)

Rank	Nation	Gold	Silver	Bronze	Total
1	China	15	5	3	23
2	Chinese Taipei	6	3	6	15
3	India	4	4	4	12
4	Thailand	4	2	2	8
5	Qatar	4	1	1	6
6	Japan	3	13	6	22
7	Sri Lanka*	2	2	3	7
8	Iran	2	1	4	7
9	Kazakhstan	1	4	3	8
10	Saudi Arabia	1	3	2	6
11	South Korea	1	2	2	5
12	Vietnam	1	0	1	2
13	Malaysia	0	1	2	3
14	Kuwait	0	1	1	2
14	North Korea	0	1	1	2
16	Indonesia	0	1	0	1
17	Hong Kong	0	0	2	2
17	Singapore	0	0	2	2
Totals (18 entries)		44	44	45	133

== Participation ==
- Bahrain
- Bangladesh
- China
- Chinese Taipei
- Hong Kong
- Indonesia
- India
- Iran
- Japan
- Jordan
- Kazakhstan
- South Korea
- Lebanon
- Macau
- Malaysia
- Maldives
- Philippines
- Qatar
- Saudi Arabia
- Singapore
- Syria
- Sri Lanka
- Thailand
- Uzbekistan
- Vietnam
