= Dharun Ayyasamy =

Indian track athlete (born 1996)

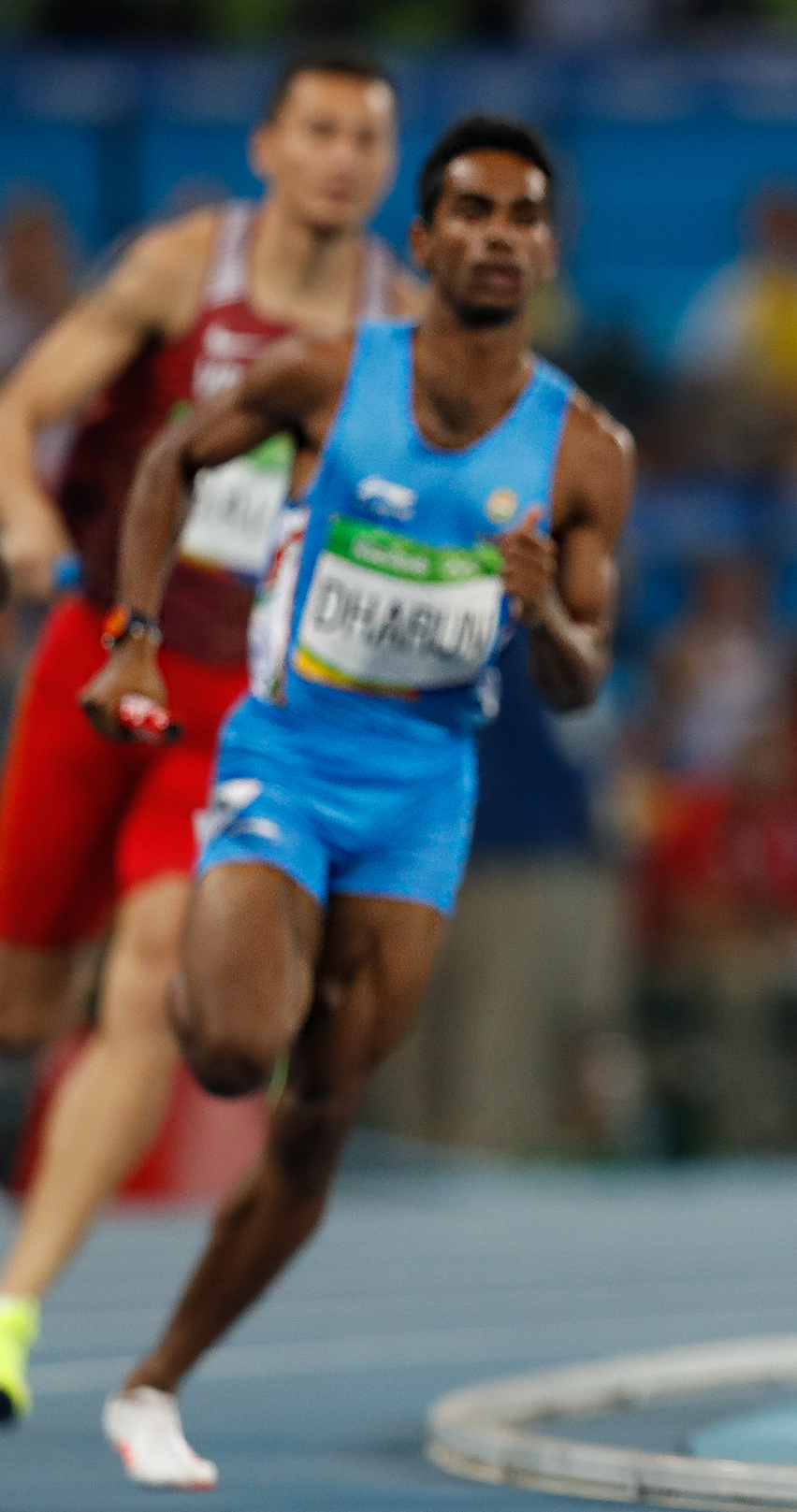
- Dharun at the 2016 Rio Olympics

Personal information
- Born: 31 December 1996 (age 29) Tiruppur, Tamil Nadu, India
- Height: 1.77 m (5 ft 10 in)

Sport
- Sport: Athletics
- Events: 400 m, 400 m hurdles

Achievements and titles
- Personal bests: 400 m: 46.30 (2016); 400 m hurdles: 48.80 NR (2019)
Medal record
Men's athletics
Representing India
Asian Games
Silver medal – second place	2018 Jakarta	400 m hurdles
Silver medal – second place	2018 Jakarta	4x400m relay
South Asian Games
Gold medal – first place	2016 Guwahati	400 m hurdles

Dharun Ayyasamy (born 31 December 1996) is an Indian track athlete who specializes in 400 m and 400 m hurdles events. He is the first and only Indian to run below 49sec (48.80sec) in 400 m hurdles. Dharun represented India in the men's 4 × 400 m relay event at the 2016 Rio Olympics.

== Early life ==
Dharun was born on 31 December 1996 in Ravuthampalayam village in Tiruppur district of Tamil Nadu. When he was in fourth grade, his father died of tuberculosis. Dharun's mother was a school teacher while his sister Sathya played volleyball for Tamil Nadu.

Dharun completed his schooling at The Century Foundation School in Tiruppur. He represented Tamil Nadu at kho kho before switching to athletics in tenth grade. He did his Bachelor of Arts degree at Alva's College of Arts in Moodabidri, Karnataka.

== Career ==
Dharun won the 400 metres hurdles gold medal at the 2016 South Asian Games with a time of 50.54 seconds, finishing 0.03 seconds ahead of fellow Indian Jithin Paul whom he overtook at the last hurdle.

In July 2016, Dharun was part of the relay team that broke the national 4 × 400 m relay record at Bengaluru and qualified for the Olympics. The quartet of Dharun, Mohammad Anas, Kunhu Muhammed and Arokia Rajiv clocked 3:00:91, rewriting the national record of 3:02.17 set by themselves four weeks earlier in Turkey. The performance helped the relay team jump to 13th place in the world rankings. It was the third time a men's relay team from India qualified for the Olympics, after 1964 and 2000.

In August 2018, Dharun won the 400 m hurdles silver medal at the Asian Games with a timing of 48.96 seconds setting a new national record.

At the 2019 Federation Cup, Dharun broke his own national record for the third time in 400 m hurdles by clocking 48.80 seconds.
