= Kunhu Muhammed =

Indian sprinter

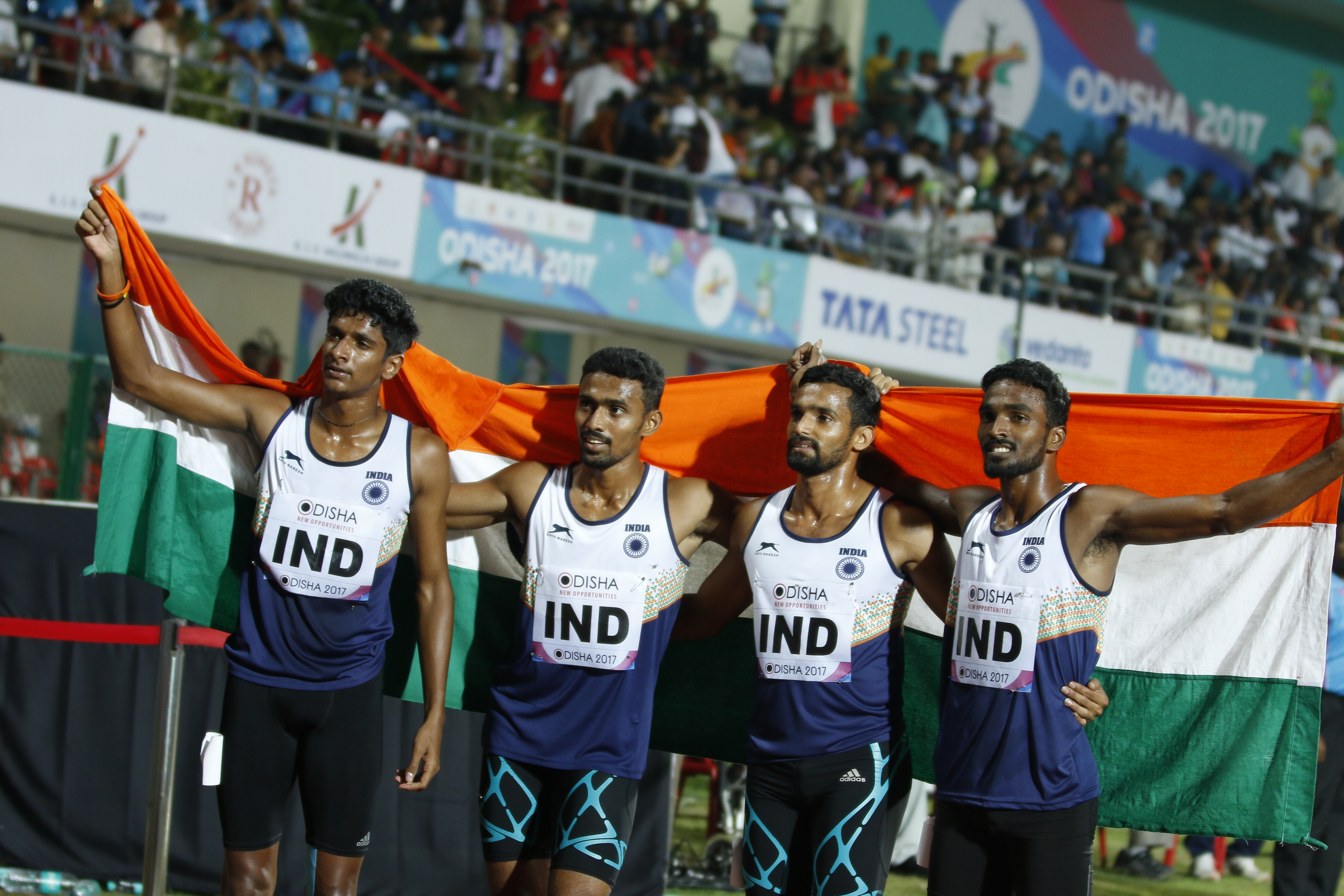
- Amoj Jacob, Muhammed Anas, Kunhu Mohammed And Arokia Rajiv(Gold Winners)

Personal information
- Born: 5 March 1987 (age 39) Mannarkkad, Palakkad district, Kerala, India

Sport
- Country: India
- Sport: Track and field
- Event: 400 metres
Medal record
Representing India
Asian Championships
Gold medal – first place	2017 Bhubaneswar	4×400 m
Asian Games
Silver medal – second place	2018 Jakarta	Men's 4×400 m
South Asian Games
Gold medal – first place	2016 Guwahati/Shillong	4×400 m
Silver medal – second place	2016 Guwahati/Shillong	400 m

Kunhu Muhammed Puthanpurakkal (born 5 March 1987) is an Indian sprinter who specialises in the 400 metres event. He participated in the 4 × 400 metres relay event at the 2016 Summer Olympics.

In July 2016, Muhammed was part of the relay team that broke the national 4 × 400 metres relay at Bangalore and qualified for the Olympics. The quartet of Muhammed, Mohammad Anas, Ayyasamy Dharun and Arokia Rajiv clocked 3:00:91, rewriting the national record of 3:02.17 set by themselves four weeks earlier in Turkey. The performance also helped the relay team jump to 13th place in the world rankings. Muhammed is a 3-time Asian Games finalist and national champion.
