= Athletics at the 2022 Asian Games =

- Venue: Qiantang River Green Belt; Hangzhou Olympic Expo Main Stadium
- Dates: 29 September – 5 October 2023
- Competitors: 650 from 42 nations

Athletics at the 2022 Asian Games was held at the Hangzhou Olympic Sports Park Main Stadium in Hangzhou Olympic Expo Center, Hangzhou, China, from 29 September to 5 October 2023.

== Schedule ==
●	1st day	●	Final day	H	Heats	Q	Qualification	S	Semifinals	F	Final

Event↓/Date →	29th Fri	30th Sat		1st Sun		2nd Mon	3rd Tue	4th Wed	5th Thu
Men's 100 m	H	S	F						
Men's 200 m				H	S	F			
Men's 400 m	H	F							
Men's 800 m						H	F		
Men's 1500 m		H		F					
Men's 5000 m								F	
Men's 10,000 m		F							
Men's 110 m hurdles				H		F			
Men's 400 m hurdles						H	F		
Men's 3000 m steeplechase				F					
Men's 4 × 100 m relay						H	F		
Men's 4 × 400 m relay							H	F	
Men's marathon									F
Men's 20 km walk	F								
Men's high jump						Q		F	
Men's pole vault		F							
Men's long jump		Q		F					
Men's triple jump							F		
Men's shot put				F					
Men's discus throw						F			
Men's hammer throw		F							
Men's javelin throw								F	
Men's decathlon						●	●		
Women's 100 m	H	F							
Women's 200 m				H		F			
Women's 400 m	H	F							
Women's 800 m							H	F	
Women's 1500 m				F					
Women's 5000 m							F		
Women's 10,000 m	F								
Women's 100 m hurdles		H		F					
Women's 400 m hurdles						H	F		
Women's 3000 m steeplechase						F			
Women's 4 × 100 m relay							F		
Women's 4 × 400 m relay								F	
Women's marathon									F
Women's 20 km walk	F								
Women's high jump							F		
Women's pole vault						F			
Women's long jump						F			
Women's triple jump								F	
Women's shot put	F								
Women's discus throw				F					
Women's hammer throw	F								
Women's javelin throw							F		
Women's heptathlon		●		●					
Mixed 4 × 400 m relay						F			
Mixed 35 km walk team								F	

== Medalists ==
=== Men ===
Event	Gold		Silver		Bronze	
100 m	Xie Zhenye; China	9.97	Puripol Boonson; Thailand	10.02	Muhd Azeem Fahmi; Malaysia	10.11
200 m	Koki Ueyama; Japan	20.60	Abdullah Abkar Mohammed; Saudi Arabia	20.63	Yang Chun-han; Chinese Taipei	20.74
400 m	Yousef Masrahi; Saudi Arabia	45.55	Kentaro Sato; Japan	45.57	Abbas Yusuf Ali; Bahrain	45.65
800 m	Essa Kzwani; Saudi Arabia	1:48.05	Mohammed Afsal; India	1:48.43	Husain Al-Farsi; Oman	1:48.51
1500 m	Mohamad Al-Garni; Qatar	3:38.36	Ajay Kumar Saroj; India	3:38.94	Jinson Johnson; India	3:39.74
5000 m	Birhanu Balew; Bahrain	13:17.40; GR	Avinash Sable; India	13:21.09	Dawit Fikadu; Bahrain	13:25.63
10,000 m	Birhanu Balew; Bahrain	28:13.62	Kartik Kumar; India	28:15.38	Gulveer Singh; India	28:17.21
110 m hurdles	Yaqoub Al-Youha; Kuwait	13.41	Shared gold		Xu Zhuoyi; China	13.50
110 m hurdles	Shunya Takayama; Japan	13.41	Shared gold		Xu Zhuoyi; China	13.50
400 m hurdles	Abderrahman Samba; Qatar	48.04	Bassem Hemeida; Qatar	48.52	Xie Zhiyu; China	49.16
3000 m steeplechase	Avinash Sable; India	8:19.50; GR	Ryoma Aoki; Japan	8:23.75	Seiya Sunada; Japan	8:26.47
4 × 100 m relay	China; Chen Guanfeng; Xie Zhenye; Yan Haibin; Chen Jiapeng	38.29	Japan; Yoshihide Kiryu; Yuki Koike; Koki Ueyama; Shoto Uno	38.44	South Korea; Lee Jeong-tae; Kim Kuk-young; Lee Jae-seong; Ko Seung-hwan; Park Won-jin	38.74
4 × 400 m relay	India; Muhammed Anas; Amoj Jacob; Muhammad Ajmal Variyathodi; Rajesh Ramesh; Nihal William; Mijo Chacko Kurian	3:01.58	Qatar; Abderrahman Samba; Ashraf Osman; Ismail Abakar; Bassem Hemeida; Ammar Ibrahim; Amar Ebed	3:02.05	Sri Lanka; Aruna Darshana; Pabasara Niku; Rajitha Rajakaruna; Kalinga Kumarage; Dinuka Deshan; Pasindu Kodikara	3:02.55
Marathon	He Jie; China	2:13:02	Han Il-ryong; North Korea	2:13:27	Yang Shaohui; China	2:13:39
20 km walk	Zhang Jun; China	1:23:00	Wang Zhaozhao; China	1:24:08	Yutaro Murayama; Japan	1:24:41
High jump	Mutaz Barsham; Qatar	2.35 =GR	Woo Sang-hyeok; South Korea	2.33	Tomohiro Shinno; Japan	2.29
Pole vault	EJ Obiena; Philippines	5.90; GR	Huang Bokai; China	5.65	Hussain Al-Hizam; Saudi Arabia	5.65
Long jump	Wang Jianan; China	8.22	Murali Sreeshankar; India	8.19	Shi Yuhao; China	8.10
Triple jump	Zhu Yaming; China	17.13	Fang Yaoqing; China	16.93	Praveen Chithravel; India	16.68
Shot put	Tajinderpal Singh Toor; India	20.36	Mohammed Tolo; Saudi Arabia	20.18	Liu Yang; China	19.97
Discus throw	Hossein Rasouli; Iran	62.04	Ehsan Haddadi; Iran	61.82	Abuduaini Tuergong; China	61.19
Hammer throw	Wang Qi; China	72.97	Ashraf Amgad El-Seify; Qatar	72.42	Suhrob Khodjaev; Uzbekistan	70.79
Javelin throw	Neeraj Chopra; India	88.88	Kishore Jena; India	87.54	Genki Dean; Japan	82.68
Decathlon	Sun Qihao; China	7816	Tejaswin Shankar; India	7666	Yuma Maruyama; Japan	7568

=== Women ===
Event	Gold		Silver		Bronze	
100 m	Ge Manqi; China	11.23	Shanti Pereira; Singapore	11.27	Hajar Al-Khaldi; Bahrain	11.35
200 m	Shanti Pereira; Singapore	23.03	Li Yuting; China	23.28	Edidiong Odiong; Bahrain	23.48
400 m	Kemi Adekoya; Bahrain	50.66	Salwa Eid Naser; Bahrain	50.92	Shereen Samson Vallabouy; Malaysia	52.58
800 m	Tharushi Karunarathna; Sri Lanka	2:03.20	Harmilan Bains; India	2:03.75	Wang Chunyu; China	2:03.90
1500 m	Winfred Yavi; Bahrain	4:11.65	Harmilan Bains; India	4:12.74	Marta Yota; Bahrain	4:15.97
5000 m	Parul Chaudhary; India	15:14.75	Ririka Hironaka; Japan	15:15.34	Caroline Chepkoech Kipkirui; Kazakhstan	15:23.12
10,000 m	Violah Jepchumba; Bahrain	31:43.73	Ririka Hironaka; Japan	31:50.74	Caroline Chepkoech Kipkirui; Kazakhstan	33:15.83
100 m hurdles	Lin Yuwei; China	12.74	Jyothi Yarraji; India	12.91	Yumi Tanaka; Japan	13.04
400 m hurdles	Kemi Adekoya; Bahrain	54.45; GR	Mo Jiadie; China	55.01	Vithya Ramraj; India	55.68
3000 m steeplechase	Winfred Yavi; Bahrain	9:18.28; GR	Parul Chaudhary; India	9:27.63	Priti Lamba; India	9:43.32
4 × 100 m relay	China; Liang Xiaojing; Wei Yongli; Yuan Qiqi; Ge Manqi	43.39	Thailand; Supawan Thipat; Supanich Poolkerd; Onuma Chattha; Sukanda Petraksa	44.32	Malaysia; Azreen Nabila Alias; Zaidatul Husniah Zulkifli; Nur Afrina Batrisyia; Shereen Samson Vallabouy	45.01
4 × 400 m relay	Bahrain; Muna Saad Mubarak; Kemi Adekoya; Zenab Moussa Mahamat; Salwa Eid Naser	3:27.65; GR	India; Vithya Ramraj; Aishwarya Mishra; Prachi Choudhary; Subha Venkatesan	3:27.85	Sri Lanka; Nadeesha Ramanayake; Jayeshi Uththara; Lakshima Mendis; Tharushi Karunarathna	3:30.88
Marathon	Eunice Chumba; Bahrain	2:26:14	Zhang Deshun; China	2:27:55	Sardana Trofimova; Kyrgyzstan	2:28:41
20 km walk	Yang Jiayu; China	1:30:03	Ma Zhenxia; China	1:30:04	Nanako Fujii; Japan	1:33:49
High jump	Safina Sadullayeva; Uzbekistan	1.86	Svetlana Radzivil; Uzbekistan	1.86	Nadezhda Dubovitskaya; Kazakhstan	1.86
Pole vault	Li Ling; China	4.63; GR	Misaki Morota; Japan	4.48	Niu Chunge; China	4.30
Long jump	Xiong Shiqi; China	6.73	Ancy Sojan; India	6.63	Yue Nga Yan; Hong Kong	6.50
Triple jump	Sharifa Davronova; Uzbekistan	14.09	Zeng Rui; China	13.92	Mariko Morimoto; Japan	13.78
Shot put	Gong Lijiao; China	19.58	Song Jiayuan; China	18.92	Kiran Baliyan; India	17.36
Discus throw	Feng Bin; China	67.93; GR	Jiang Zhichao; China	61.04	Seema Punia; India	58.62
Hammer throw	Wang Zheng; China	71.53	Zhao Jie; China	69.44	Kim Tae-hui; South Korea	64.14
Javelin throw	Annu Rani; India	62.92	Dilhani Lekamge; Sri Lanka	61.57	Lü Huihui; China	61.29
Heptathlon	Zheng Ninali; China	6149	Ekaterina Voronina; Uzbekistan	6056	Nandini Agasara; India	5712

=== Mixed ===
Event	Gold		Silver		Bronze	
4 × 400 m relay	Bahrain; Musa Isah; Kemi Adekoya; Abbas Yusuf Ali; Salwa Eid Naser	3:14.02; GR	India; Muhammad Ajmal Variyathodi; Vithya Ramraj; Rajesh Ramesh; Subha Venkatesan	3:14.34	Kazakhstan; Yefim Tarassov; Adelina Zems; Dmitriy Koblov; Alexandra Zalyubovskaya	3:24.85
35 km walk team	China; Wang Qin; Qieyang Shijie; He Xianghong; Bai Xueying	5:16:41; GR	Japan; Subaru Ishida; Masumi Fuchise; Maika Yagi	5:22:11	India; Ram Baboo; Manju Rani	5:51:14

== Medal table ==
Rank	Nation	Gold	Silver	Bronze	Total
1	China (CHN)	19	11	9	39
2	Bahrain (BRN)	10	1	5	16
3	India (IND)	6	14	9	29
4	Qatar (QAT)	3	3	0	6
5	Japan (JPN)	2	7	8	17
6	Saudi Arabia (KSA)	2	2	1	5
6	Uzbekistan (UZB)	2	2	1	5
8	Sri Lanka (SRI)	1	1	2	4
9	Iran (IRI)	1	1	0	2
9	Singapore (SGP)	1	1	0	2
11	Kuwait (KUW)	1	0	0	1
11	Philippines (PHI)	1	0	0	1
13	Thailand (THA)	0	2	0	2
14	South Korea (KOR)	0	1	2	3
15	North Korea (PRK)	0	1	0	1
16	Kazakhstan (KAZ)	0	0	4	4
17	Malaysia (MAS)	0	0	3	3
18	Chinese Taipei (TPE)	0	0	1	1
18	Hong Kong (HKG)	0	0	1	1
18	Kyrgyzstan (KGZ)	0	0	1	1
18	Oman (OMA)	0	0	1	1
Totals (21 entries)		49	47	48	144

== Participating nations ==
A total of 650 athletes from 42 nations competed in athletics at the 2018 Asian Games:

- Afghanistan (2)
- Bahrain (29)
- Bangladesh (1)
- Bhutan (1)
- Cambodia (10)
- China (62)
- Chinese Taipei (36)
- Hong Kong (25)
- India (62)
- Indonesia (15)
- Iran (8)
- Iraq (4)
- Japan (55)
- Jordan (1)
- Kazakhstan (19)
- Kuwait (7)
- Kyrgyzstan (10)
- Laos (4)
- Lebanon (3)
- Macau (8)
- Malaysia (17)
- Maldives (12)
- Mongolia (17)
- Nepal (8)
- North Korea (4)
- Oman (6)
- Pakistan (18)
- Palestine (3)
- Philippines (16)
- Qatar (17)
- Saudi Arabia (24)
- Singapore (16)
- South Korea (45)
- Sri Lanka (14)
- Syria (1)
- Tajikistan (4)
- Thailand (38)
- Timor-Leste (4)
- Turkmenistan (2)
- United Arab Emirates (1)
- Uzbekistan (9)
- Vietnam (12)
