= 2023 Asian Athletics Championships – Women's 400 metres =

Women's 400 metres at the 2023 Asian Athletics Championships
- Venue: National Stadium
- Location: Bangkok, Thailand
- Dates: 12 July (heats); 13 July (final)
- Competitors: 19 from 12 nations
- Winning time: 52.61

Medalists
gold medal	Nadeesha Ramanayake	Sri Lanka
silver medal	Aishwarya Mishra	India
bronze medal	Haruna Kuboyama	Japan

The women's 400 metres event at the 2023 Asian Athletics Championships was held on 12 and 13 July.

In April 2024, it was revealed that silver medallist Fairda Soliyeva of Uzbekistan failed a test for meldonium, disqualifying her from the competition.

== Records ==
Records before the 2023 Asian Athletics Championships
Record	Athlete (nation)	Time (s)	Location	Date
World record	Marita Koch (GDR)	47.60	Canberra, Australia	6 October 1985
Asian record	Salwa Eid Naser (BHR)	48.14	Doha, Qatar	3 October 2019
Championship record	Damayanthi Dharsha (SRI)	51.05	Jakarta, Indonesia	30 August 2000
World leading	Sydney McLaughlin-Levrone (USA)	48.74	Eugene, United States	8 July 2023
Asian leading	Salwa Eid Naser (BHR)	49.78	Huelva, Spain	6 June 2023

== Results ==
=== Heats ===
Qualification rule: First 2 in each heat (Q) and the next 2 fastest (q) qualified for the final.

Rank	Heat	Name	Nationality	Time	Notes
1	1	Nadeesha Ramanayake	Sri Lanka	53.06	Q
2	3	Farida Soliyeva	Uzbekistan	53.49	Q
3	2	Aishwarya Mishra	India	53.58	Q
4	1	Laylo Allaberganova	Uzbekistan	53.65	Q, PB
5	3	Haruna Kuboyama	Japan	53.95	Q
6	1	Nanako Matsumoto	Japan	53.98	q
7	3	Alexandra Zalyubovskaya	Kazakhstan	54.66	q
8	1	Hoàng Thị Minh Hành	Vietnam	54.70	PB
9	3	Benny Nonthaman	Thailand	56.23	
10	2	Jane Christa Ming	Hong Kong	56.64	Q
11	2	Arisa Weruwanarak	Thailand	56.78	
12	2	Aliya Boshnak	Jordan	57.22	
13	3	Pui Kwan Tang	Hong Kong	57.56	
14	1	Solongo Batbold	Mongolia	57.62	PB
15	3	Thị Anh Thúc Hoàng	Vietnam	57.89	
16	1	Hawwa Muzna Faiz	Maldives	58.49	
17	2	Ziva Moosa	Maldives	58.55	PB
	1	Maureen Schrijvers	Philippines	DQ	R17.3.1
	2	Elina Mikhina	Kazakhstan	DQ	FS

=== Final ===
Rank	Lane	Name	Nationality	Time	Notes
1st place, gold medalist(s)	5	Nadeesha Ramanayake	Sri Lanka	52.61	PB
2nd place, silver medalist(s)	3	Aishwarya Mishra	India	53.07	
3rd place, bronze medalist(s)	8	Haruna Kuboyama	Japan	53.80	
4	1	Nanako Matsumoto	Japan	53.89	
5	2	Alexandra Zalyubovskaya	Kazakhstan	54.54	
6	6	Laylo Allaberganova	Uzbekistan	54.61	
7	7	Jane Christa Ming	Hong Kong	56.12	
DQ	4	Farida Soliyeva	Uzbekistan	~~52.95~~	~~PB~~
