= List of Asian Athletics Championships records =

The Asian Athletics Championships is a quadrennial event which began in 1973. Asian Athletics Association accepts only athletes who are representing one of the organisation's Asian member states and the body recognises records set at editions of the Asian Athletics Championships.

== Men's records ==
Event	Record	Athlete	Nation	Date	Edition	Place	Ref.
100 m	9.91 (+1.8 m/s)	Femi Ogunode	Qatar	4 June 2015	2015	Wuhan, China	
200 m	20.12 (+0.8 m/s)	Towa Uzawa	Japan	31 May 2025	2025	Gumi, South Korea	
400 m	44.61	Sugath Thilakaratne	Sri Lanka	20 July 1998	1998	Fukuoka, Japan	
800 m	1:44.27	Majed Saeed Sultan	Qatar	4 September 2005	2005	Incheon, South Korea	
1500 m	3:38.60	Kim Soon-Hyung	South Korea	3 December 1993	1993	Manila, Philippines	
5000 m	13:24.77	Gulveer Singh	India	30 May 2025	2025	Gumi, South Korea	
10,000 m	28:23.70	Hasan Mahboob	Bahrain	14 November 2009	2009	Guangzhou, China	
110 m hurdles	13.21 (+1.7 m/s)	Xie Wenjun	China	24 April 2019	2019	Doha, Qatar	
400 m hurdles	47.51	Abderrahman Samba	Qatar	22 April 2019	2019	Doha, Qatar	
3000 m steeplechase	8:16.00	Khamis Abdullah Saifeldin	Qatar	10 August 2002	2002	Colombo, Sri Lanka	
High jump	2.35 m	Mutaz Essa Barshim	Qatar	9 July 2011	2011	Kobe, Japan	
Pole vault	5.91 m	EJ Obiena	Philippines	16 July 2023	2023	Bangkok, Thailand	
Long jump	8.40 m (+0.3 m/s)	Lin Yu-tang	Chinese Taipei	15 July 2023	2023	Bangkok, Thailand	
Triple jump	17.22 m (−1.0 m/s)	Chen Yanping	China	23 October 1991	1991	Kuala Lumpur, Malaysia	
Shot put	20.41 m	Inderjeet Singh	India	3 June 2015	2015	Wuhan, China	
Discus throw	65.95 m	Ehsan Haddadi	Iran	21 April 2019	2019	Doha, Qatar	
Hammer throw	80.45 m	Koji Murofushi	Japan	10 August 2002	2002	Colombo, Sri Lanka	
Javelin throw	86.72 m	Cheng Chao-tsun	Chinese Taipei	22 April 2019	2019	Doha, Qatar	
Decathlon	8037 pts	Dmitriy Karpov	Kazakhstan	3–4 July 2013	2013	Pune, India	
Decathlon	100m / Long jump / Shot put / High jump / 400m / 110m H / Discus / Pole vault / Javelin / 1500m; 11.01 / 7.01 m / 16.18 m / 1.98 m / 49.36 / 14.46 / 50.27 m / 5.10 m / 48.40 m / 4:57.56						
20 km walk (road)	1:20:37	Wang Zhaozhao	China	27 May 2025	2025	Gumi, South Korea	
4 × 100 m relay	38.49	Minjun Seo; Joeljin Nwamadi; Lee Jae-seong; Junhyeok Lee	South Korea	31 May 2025	2025	Gumi, South Korea	
4 × 400 m relay	3:01.56	Aruna Dharshana; Rajitha Niranjan; Pabasara Niku; Kalinga Kumarage; Pasindu Kodikara	Sri Lanka	16 July 2023	2023	Bangkok, Thailand	

== Women's records ==
Event	Record	Athlete	Nation	Date	Edition	Place	Ref.
100 m	11.17 (+1.8 m/s)	Olga Safronova	Kazakhstan	22 April 2019	2019	Doha, Qatar	
200 m	22.70 (+0.1 m/s)	Shanti Pereira	Singapore	16 July 2023	2023	Bangkok, Thailand	
400 m	51.05	Damayanthi Dharsha	Sri Lanka	30 August 2000	2000	Jakarta, Indonesia	
800 m	2:00.08	Wu Hongjiao	China	31 May 2025	2025	Gumi, South Korea	
1500 m	4:06.75	Nozomi Tanaka	Japan	12 July 2023	2023	Bangkok, Thailand	
5000 m	14:58.71	Norah Jeruto	Kazakhstan	31 May 2025	2025	Gumi, South Korea	
10,000 m	31:15.62	Shitaye Eshete	Bahrain	23 April 2019	2019	Doha, Qatar	
100 m hurdles	12.89 (+1.8 m/s)	Yumi Tanaka	Japan	28 May 2025	2025	Gumi, South Korea	
400 m hurdles	54.31	Kemi Adekoya	Bahrain	6 June 2015	2015	Wuhan, China	
3000 m steeplechase	9:10.46	Norah Jeruto	Kazakhstan	30 May 2025	2025	Gumi, South Korea	
High jump	1.94 m	Miki Imai	Japan		1998	Fukuoka, Japan	
High jump	1.94 m	Tatyana Efimenko	Kyrgyzstan	28 July 2007	2007	Amman, Jordan	
Pole vault	4.66 m	Li Ling	China	6 June 2015	2015	Wuhan, China	
Pole vault	4.66 m	Li Ling	China	14 July 2023	2023	Bangkok, Thailand	
Long jump	6.97 m (+0.5 m/s)	Sumire Hata	Japan	14 July 2023	2023	Bangkok, Thailand	
Triple jump	14.69 m (+1.6 m/s)	Olga Rypakova	Kazakhstan	28 July 2007	2007	Amman, Jordan	
Shot put	19.69 m	Huang Zhihong	China	19 November 1989	1989	New Delhi, India	
Discus throw	66.42 m	Feng Bin	China	14 July 2023	2023	Bangkok, Thailand	
Hammer throw	75.66 m	Wang Zheng	China	22 April 2019	2019	Doha, Qatar	
Javelin throw	65.83 m	Lü Huihui	China	21 April 2019	2019	Doha, Qatar	
Heptathlon	6259 pts	Ghada Shouaa	Syria	1–2 December 1993	1993	Manila, Philippines	
Heptathlon	100m H / High jump / Shot put / 200m / Long jump / Javelin / 800m						
20 km walk (road)	1:30:12	Mayumi Kawasaki	Japan	13 November 2009	2009	Guangzhou, China	
4 × 100 m relay	42.87	Liang Xiaojing; Wei Yongli; Kong Lingwei; Ge Manqi	China	23 April 2019	2019	Doha, Qatar	
4 × 400 m relay	3:30.93	Rajwinder Kaur; Satti Geetha; Chitra K. Soman; Manjit Kaur	India	4 September 2005	2005	Incheon, South Korea	

== Mixed records ==
Event	Record	Athlete	Nationality	Date	Edition	Place	Ref.
4 × 400 m relay	3:14.70	Rajesh Ramesh; Aishwarya Mishra; Amoj Jacob; Subha Venkatesan	India	15 July 2023	2023	Bangkok, Thailand	
