= 2023 Asian Athletics Championships – Women's 4 × 400 metres relay =

Women's 4 × 400 metres relay at the 2023 Asian Athletics Championships
- Venue: National Stadium
- Location: Bangkok, Thailand
- Dates: 16 July
- Nations: 7
- Winning time: 3:32.36

Medalists
gold medal	Nguyễn Thị Ngoc; Hoàng Thị Minh Hành; Nguyễn Thị Huyền; Nguyễn Thị Hằng	Vietnam
silver medal	Nadeesha Ramanayaka; Lakshima Mendis; Nishendra Harshani Fernando; Tharushi Dissanayaka	Sri Lanka
bronze medal	Rezoana Mallick Heena; Aishwarya Kailash Mishra; Jyothika Sri Dandi; Subha Venkatesan	India

The women's 4 × 400 metres relay event at the 2023 Asian Athletics Championships was held on 16 July.

== Results ==
Rank	Lane	Team	Name	Time	Notes
1st place, gold medalist(s)	3	Vietnam	Nguyễn Thị Ngoc, Hoàng Thị Minh Hành, Nguyễn Thị Huyền, Nguyễn Thị Hằng	3:32.36	
2nd place, silver medalist(s)	4	Sri Lanka	Nadeesha Ramanayaka, Lakshima Mendis, Nishendra Harshani Fernando, Tharushi Dissanayaka	3:33.27	NR
3rd place, bronze medalist(s)	5	India	Rezoana Mallick Heena, Aishwarya Kailash Mishra, Jyothika Sri Dandi, Subha Venkatesan	3:33.73	
4	2	Japan	Haruna Kuboyama, Nanako Matsumoto, Shuri Aono, Ami Yamamoto	3:35.26	
5	7	Uzbekistan	Laylo Allaberganova, Kamila Mirsaliyeva, Malika Rajabova, Farida Soliyeva	3:39.83	
6	6	Hong Kong	Ying Wen Ashleigh Ma, Pui Kwan Tang, Chi Ku Chow, Jane Christa Ming	3:46.87	
	8	Maldives		DNS	
