= 2023 Asian Athletics Championships – Mixed 4 × 400 metres relay =

Mixed 4 × 400 metres relay at the 2023 Asian Athletics Championships
- Venue: National Stadium
- Location: Bangkok, Thailand
- Dates: 16 July
- Nations: 7
- Winning time: 3:14.70 CR, NR

Medalists
gold medal	Rajesh Ramesh; Aishwarya Kailash Mishra; Amoj Jacob; Subha Venkatesan	India
silver medal	Aruna Dharshana; Tharushi Dissanayaka; Kalinga Kumarage; Nadeesha Ramanayaka	Sri Lanka
bronze medal	Kenki Imaizumi; Haruna Kuboyama; Fuga Sato; Nanako Matsumoto	Japan

The mixed 4 × 400 metres relay event at the 2023 Asian Athletics Championships was held on 15 July.

== Results ==
Rank	Lane	Nation	Athlete	Time	Notes
1st place, gold medalist(s)	7	India	Rajesh Ramesh, Aishwarya Kailash Mishra, Amoj Jacob, Subha Venkatesan	3:14.70	CR, NR
2nd place, silver medalist(s)	4	Sri Lanka	Aruna Dharshana, Tharushi Dissanayaka, Kalinga Kumarage, Nadeesha Ramanayaka	3:15.41	NR
3rd place, bronze medalist(s)	2	Japan	Kenki Imaizumi, Haruna Kuboyama, Fuga Sato, Nanako Matsumoto	3:15.71	NR
4	8	Vietnam	Hoàng Trần Nhật, Nguyễn Thị Hằng, Trần Định Sơn, Hoàng Thị Minh Hành	3:20.72	
5	6	Thailand	Sarawut Nuansri, Arisa Weruwanarak, Joshua Atkinson, Benny Nontanam	3:22.20	
6	5	Philippines	Frederick Ramirez, Jessel Lumapas, Michael Del Prado, Maureen Schrijvers	3:22.53	
7	3	Kazakhstan	Andrey Sokolov, Adelina Zems, Yefim Tarassov, Alexandra Zalyubovskaya	3:27.84	
