= Salwa Eid Naser =

Bahraini sprinter

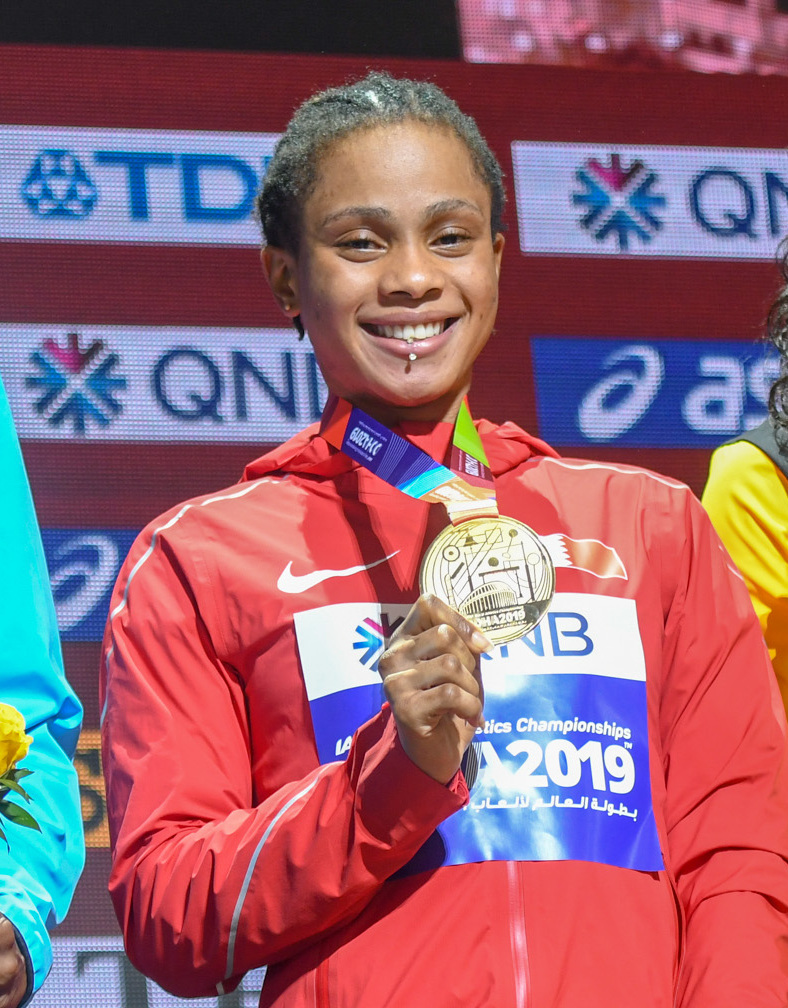
- Naser at the 2019 World Athletics Championships in Doha

Personal information
- Citizenship: Bahraini
- Born: Ebelechukwu Agbapuonwu; 23 May 1998 (age 28) Onitsha, Anambra State, Nigeria
- Years active: 2014–present
- Height: 1.68 m (5 ft 6 in)

Sport
- Country: Bahrain
- Sport: Track and field
- Event: 400 metres
- Coached by: Jose Rubio (2017–), John Obeya (2015–17)

Achievements and titles
- Olympic finals: 2016 Rio de Janeiro; 400 m, 8th (sf)
- World finals: 2017 London; 400 m, Silver; 2019 Doha; 400 m, Gold; 4 × 400 m mixed, Bronze
- Personal bests: 100 m: 11.24 (2019); 200 m: 22.51 NR (2019); 400 m: 48.14 AR (2019)
Medal record
Women's athletics
Representing Bahrain
Olympic Games
Silver medal – second place	2024 Paris	400 m
World Championships
Gold medal – first place	2019 Doha	400 m
Silver medal – second place	2017 London	400 m
Bronze medal – third place	2019 Doha	4 × 400 m mixed
Bronze medal – third place	2025 Tokyo	400 m
Diamond League
First place	2018	400 m
First place	2019	400 m
First place	2025	400 m
Asian Games
Gold medal – first place	2018 Jakarta	400 m
Gold medal – first place	2018 Jakarta	4 × 100 m relay
Gold medal – first place	2022 Hangzhou	4 × 400 m relay
Gold medal – first place	2022 Hangzhou	4 × 400 m mixed
Gold medal – first place	2026 Nagoya	400 m
Gold medal – first place	2026 Nagoya	4 × 400 m mixed
Silver medal – second place	2018 Jakarta	4 × 400 m relay
Silver medal – second place	2022 Hangzhou	400 m
Silver medal – second place	2026 Nagoya	4 × 400 m relay
Asian Championships
Gold medal – first place	2019 Doha	200 m
Gold medal – first place	2019 Doha	400 m
Gold medal – first place	2019 Doha	4 × 400 m relay
Gold medal – first place	2019 Doha	4 × 400 m mixed
Bronze medal – third place	2019 Doha	4 × 100 m relay
Asian Indoor Championships
Gold medal – first place	2016 Doha	4 × 400 m relay
Military World Games
Gold medal – first place	2015 Mungyeong	400 m
Gold medal – first place	2019 Wuhan	400 m
Bronze medal – third place	2015 Mungyeong	4 × 400 m relay
Bronze medal – third place	2019 Wuhan	4 × 100 m relay
Islamic Solidarity Games
Gold medal – first place	2017 Baku	400 m
Gold medal – first place	2017 Baku	4 × 100 m relay
Gold medal – first place	2017 Baku	4 × 400 m relay
Gold medal – first place	2025 Riyadh	400 m
Arab Championships
Gold medal – first place	2019 Cairo	200 m
Gold medal – first place	2019 Cairo	400 m
Gold medal – first place	2019 Cairo	4 × 100 m relay
Youth Olympic Games
Silver medal – second place	2014 Nanjing	400 m
World Youth Championships
Gold medal – first place	2015 Cali	400 m
Asian Youth Championships
Gold medal – first place	2015 Doha	400 m
Arab Junior Championships
Gold medal – first place	2014 Cairo	200 m
Gold medal – first place	2014 Cairo	400 m
Representing Asia-Pacific
Continental Cup
Gold medal – first place	2018 Ostrava	400 m
- Updated on 5 October 2023

Salwa Eid Naser (née Ebelechukwu Agbapuonwu, born 23 May 1998) is a Nigerian-born Bahraini sprinter who specialises in the 400 meter race. She was the 2019 World champion, with the fifth-fastest time in history of 48.14 seconds, becoming the youngest-ever champion in the event and the first woman representing an Asian nation to win it at a World Championships. At the time, the time placed her only behind the contested results of Marita Koch (47.60; 1985) and Jarmila Kratochvílová (47.99; 1983). At 19, Naser was the 2017 World 400 metre silver medallist. As a member of the Bahraini mixed-gender 4 × 400 m relay team, she also won the 2019 World Championships bronze medal.

In the 400 metre sprint, Eid Naser was the 2014 Youth Olympic silver medallist and 2015 World Youth champion. At the 2015 Military World Games, she won her first senior medal, gold. At 18, she skipped the 2016 World U20 Championships, in which the winning time was 51.32 seconds, to compete with the world's best 400 m sprinters at the 2016 Rio Olympics, where she placed equal ninth in the semi-finals with a time of 50.88 seconds. She is a multiple medallist of Asian Games, Asian Championships, and other top-level military and pan-regional competitions, both individually and in relays. A two-time 400 m Diamond League champion, as of December 2022, she held the eighth-fastest Asian results of all time, nine marks in the top 10, and 18 in the top 20.

Eid Naser served a competition ban from 30 June 2021 to February 2023 due to an anti-doping rule violation relating to whereabouts failures.

== Early life ==
Eid Naser was born Ebelechukwu Antoinette Agbapuonwu on 23 May 1998 in Onitsha, Anambra, to a Nigerian parents Her mother had competed as a 100 m and 200 m sprinter at school, and Eid Naser soon discovered her own sprinting abilities. In her first competitive school race at age 11, she won the 100 m and 400 m sprints. Her teacher insisted she would make a good 400 m runner, so Eid Naser started to focus on that distance. In 2014, she switched allegiance to Bahrain and had her name changed. In 2017, when asked about her move, she said that the "past three years have been a great transition for me" and she did not wish to comment on her relationship with the Athletics Federation of Nigeria. In 2019, she said she was happy that people in Nigeria were celebrating her win.

== Career ==
=== 2014–2016: World youth champion ===
Based in Riffa in Bahrain's Southern Governorate, Eid Naser had her first success at the 2014 Arab Junior Championships, where she was a gold medallist in both the 200 m and 400 m. Following this achievement, she began to take the sport more seriously and set a new personal best of 54.50 seconds at the Asian Trials for the 2014 Youth Olympics. Eid Naser steadily improved her best further at the Olympics, recording 53.95 seconds in the first round before taking a silver medal behind Australia's Jessica Thornton with a much improved time of 52.74. The sprinter then began working with former Bulgarian athlete Yanko Bratanov, who also coached fellow Nigerian-Bahraini athletes Kemi Adekoya and Samuel Francis (banned / disqualified for doping) among others.

In May 2015, she confirmed herself as the continent's best 400 m runner in her age group with a gold medal at the Asian Youth Championships. In June, while in Bulgaria, she set national junior records in the 100 m and 200 m, clocking 11.70 seconds and 23.03 seconds respectively. Eid Naser then proved herself among the best globally in the 400 m at the World Youth Championships. A patient run in a tight hijab, what was her own decision, saw her overhaul the more favoured American Lynna Irby in the final stages of the race, and she achieved a lifetime best of 51.50 s to take the gold medal. The final came on the day after Ramadan which allowed her to eat normally before the race, after having fasted during the qualifying rounds. The gold medal made her the second-ever Bahraini woman to win a global-level title, after senior world champion Maryam Yusuf Jamal. Her tactical running was praised by USA's decathlon world record holder Ashton Eaton, who invited her on an all-expenses paid trip to train with him for three days.

Barely 17 years old, in October 2015 she took her first senior title at the Military World Games. Competing in the 400 m against 2012 Olympians Bianca Răzor and Nataliya Pyhyda, she improved to win a gold medal with a world youth-leading and national under-20 record time of 51.39 seconds, becoming the youngest ever winner of that title. This result was the second-fastest Asian under-18—and 10th fastest world U18—time in history.

Eid Naser had since been coached by Nigerian ex-pat John George Obeya, who had been based in Bahrain for several years.

At the 2016 Summer Olympics in Rio de Janeiro, the 18-year-old made her next progress and won her heat with a personal best of 51.06 seconds. In the semi-final, she improved even further running 50.88, but placed equal ninth overall and did not advance by one place and 0.13; her time ranked her sixth in the final results. Just a week earlier, Naser twisted her ankle, which had first been weakened when she was struck by a car aged six. It opened up a fracture and she was advised not to compete, but she wanted to in her first Olympics. After the Games, she had to take three months rest to treat her leg.

=== 2017–2019: World silver medallist and champion ===
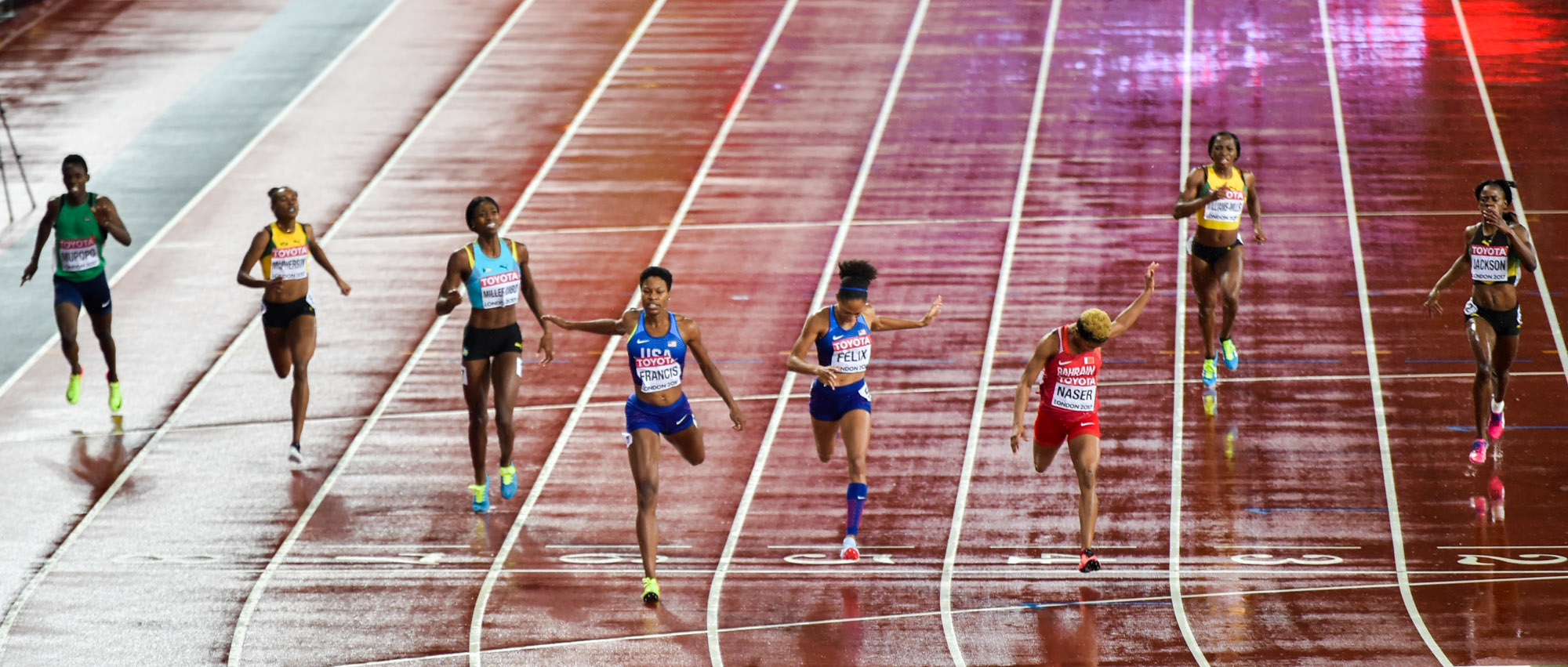
At age 19, Eid Naser (third from the right in red) took silver in the 400 m at the 2017 World Championships in Athletics in London.

While still a junior, Eid Naser claimed the silver medal in the 400 m event at the 2017 London World Championships with a new personal best of 50.06 seconds, after winning and each time improving in her heat and semi-final, finally lowering her personal best by a massive 0.82. The final took place on a wet surface during light rain. She was last midway through the race, and when she turned the final corner she was still only fourth, eventually beating Allyson Felix by 0.02 and being beaten only by Phyllis Francis (photo finish). Shaunae Miller-Uibo had been leading until the last 30 metres when she got the staggers and dropped from first to fourth. At age 19, it made Eid Naser the youngest woman ever to reach the podium over 400 m at a World Championships; she also thrice broke the Bahraini national record. Less than two weeks later, she won in the distance at the Diamond League meeting in Birmingham, and then set an even better personal best of 49.88 seconds in Brussels a week later, securing second place overall in the Diamond Race. This result, the third-fastest world under-20 time in history and an Asian U20 record, would have given her first place in London.

Since November 2017, she has been coached by Dominican Jose Ludwig Rubio.

In 2018, Eid Naser competed at seven 400 m Diamond League events, winning six of them and achieving six marks below 50 seconds. On 30 June, at the Paris Meeting, she won with a new lifetime best of 49.55 seconds, breaking an Asian record set in 1993 by Ma Yuqin. On 20 July, at the Herculis meet in Monaco, she greatly improved her PB in a time of 49.08 seconds to finish second just behind Shaunae Miller-Uibo, who set the circuit record with her result 48.97. It was the fastest women's 400 m race run since 2009, and also the first since 1996 in which two women went below 49.10 seconds. In August, Eid Naser won the race at the Asian Games in Jakarta. On 30 August, she also won the 4 × 100 m relay final and went on to take silver in the 4 × 400 m relay. She flew to Brussels later that night and won the Diamond League 400 m title just hours later in 49.33 seconds. A few days later, the sprinter won also Continental Cup held in Ostrava running 49.32 seconds. In 2018 in total, she won 10 out of her 11 400 m races and recorded seven sub-50-second clockings.

During the 2019 Asian Championships in Doha, Qatar, she claimed gold medals for both the 200 m and 400 m, and also for the 4 × 400 m relay, 4 × 400 m mixed relay, and a bronze for the 4 × 100 m relay. In the 2019 Diamond League events, she competed in and won five 400 m races taking her second circuit championship. The sprinter clocked her best time of 49.17 seconds setting a meet record on 5 July at the Athletissima in Lausanne, Switzerland.

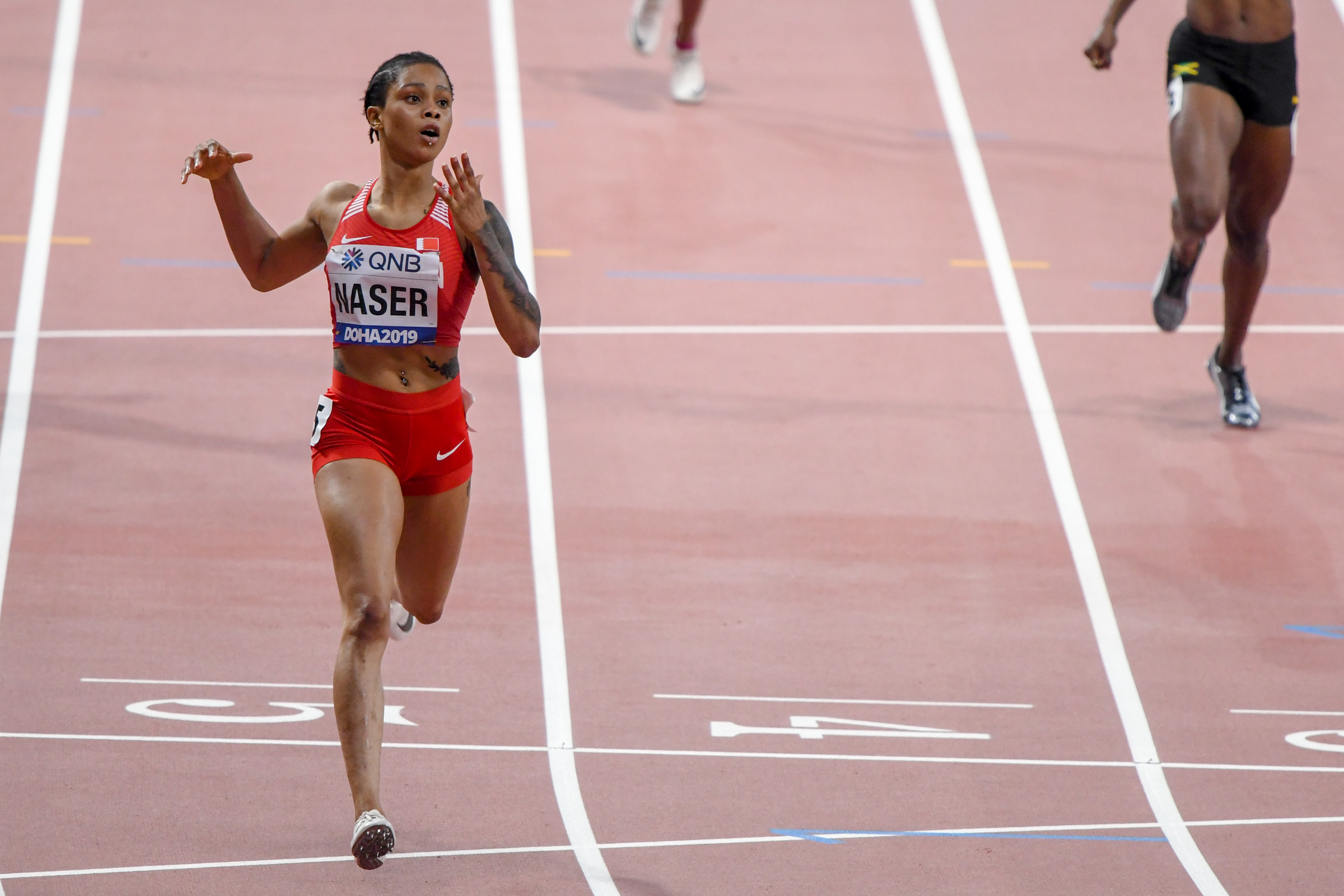
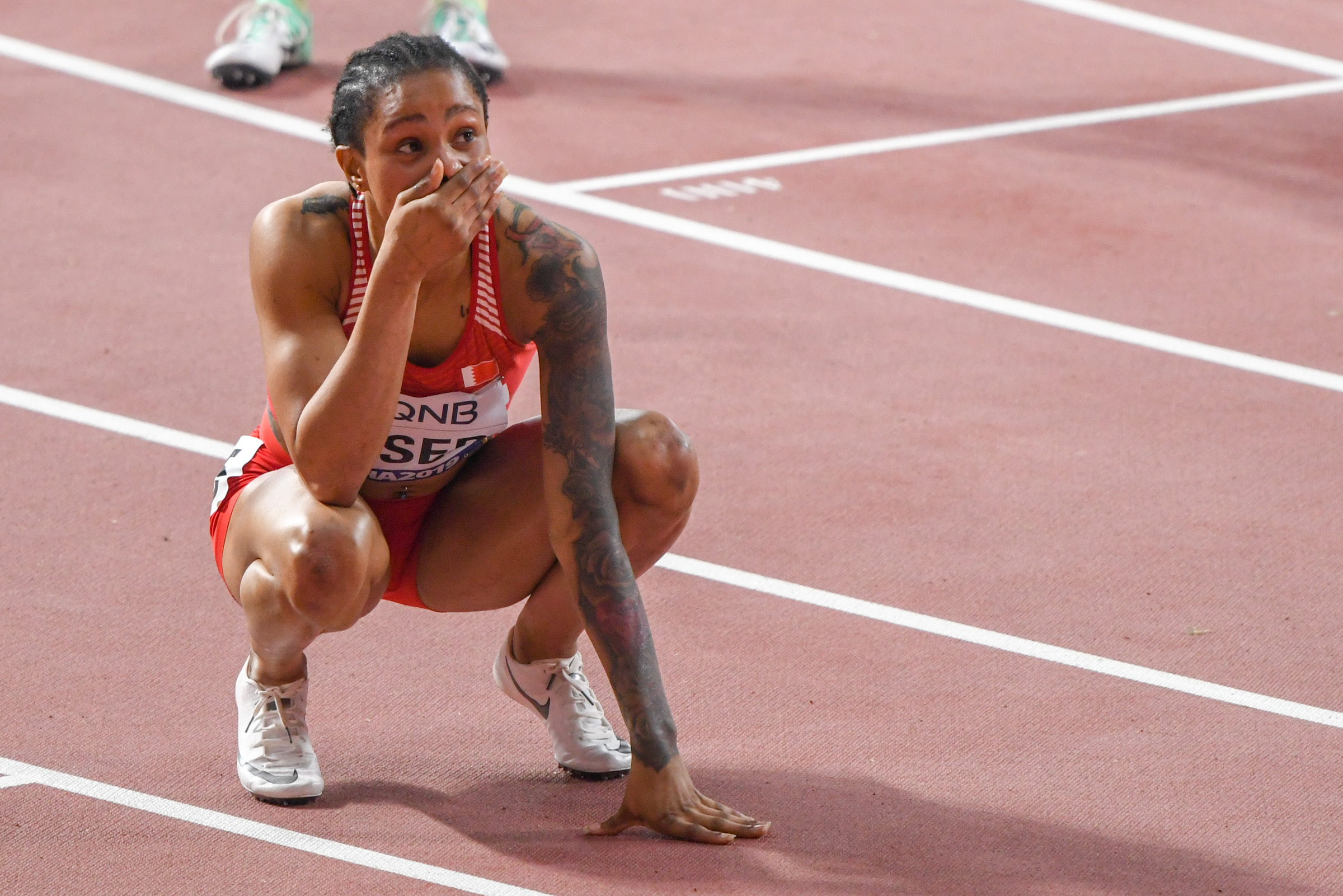
Salwa Eid Naser ran in the 400 m for the third-fastest time in history at Doha 2019.

External, official videos
- see Videos
- 2018 Interview: "I do dream big" (2m 57s)
- Undefeated Salwa Eid Naser cruises to a 400m victory in Zurich (2019) (1m 13s)
- Salwa Eid Naser Storms to 400m Gold – Doha Moments (1m 3s)

On 3 October 2019, Eid Naser became the 400 metres world champion at the Doha World Championships in Qatar, the youngest ever and also the first Asian female winner of that title. She improved her personal best, set one year earlier, by a massive 0.94 seconds, and her result of 48.14 seconds had been the fastest since 1985 – that is for 34 years (when Marita Koch set a world record of 47.60), the second-fastest at a World Championships (only behind Jarmila Kratochvílová who ran 47.99 in 1983), and the third-fastest of all time. This had been her fifth race in five days and the top five women all set PBs. She additionally took the bronze medal for the 4 × 400 m mixed relay, which set an Asian record. During the 2019 Military World Games, the sprinter finished as the gold medallist in her signature event, extending her unbeaten streak in the event to 14 straight finals and a bronze one in the 4 × 100 m relay. Eid Naser finished the 2019 season unbeaten.

=== 2020–2022: Two year anti-doping regulations suspension ===
In June 2020, the Athletics Integrity Unit (AIU) issued a provisional suspension to Eid Naser due to whereabouts failures over a 12-month period, including one filing failure and three missed tests. In October 2020, a World Athletics Disciplinary Tribunal dismissed the charges and lifted the suspension. However World Athletics and WADA appealed this decision to the Court of Arbitration for Sport (CAS). On 30 June 2021, CAS upheld the appeal, issuing a two-year competition ban to Naser that ran from June 2021 to February 2023 (taking into account credit for the provisional suspension. All her results from 25 November 2019 to 30 June 2021 were also disqualified.

=== 2023-present: Comeback and Olympic medallist ===
At the 2024 Summer Olympics, Eid Naser won the silver medal in the women's 400 m final behind Marileidy Paulino. She clocked a time of 48.53 seconds, which was the second-fastest time of her career.

In April 2025, Eid Naser won the 400 m at the Grand Slam Track. She competed in the 400 m at the 2025 Diamond League Series five times, winning three of those races—including the Final in Zurich—and claimed her third annual title. In September, she placed third in the 400 m at the World Championships in Tokyo with a time of 48.19 seconds.

In September 2026, at the Asian Games held in Nagoya, she won the 400 m and the mixed 4 × 400 m relay, and placed second in the women’s 4 × 400 m relay.

== Recognition ==
She was recognized as one of the BBC's 100 Women of 2019.

== Achievements ==
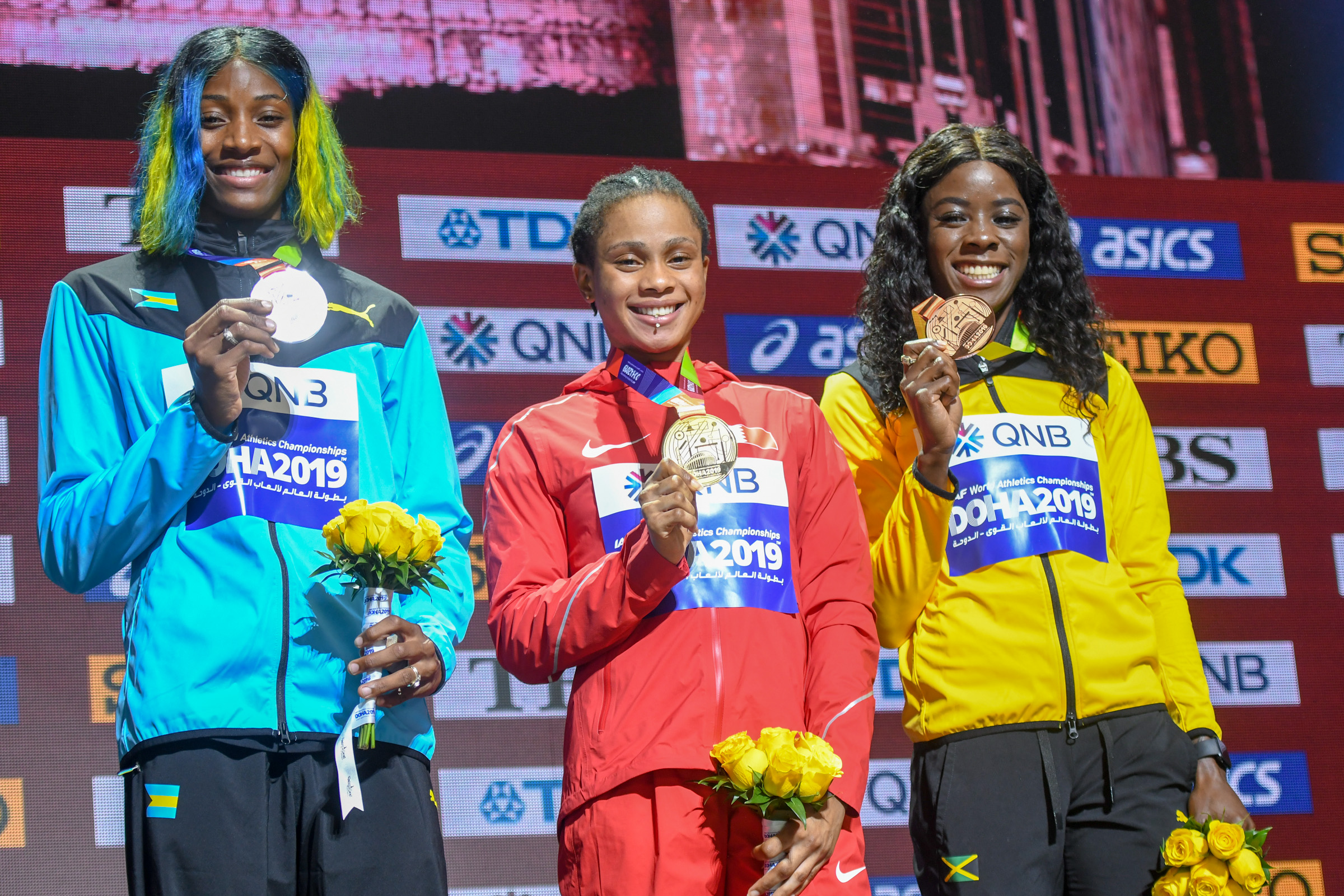
Women's 400 m podium at the 2019 World Championships in Doha (L–R): Shaunae Miller-Uibo, Salwa Eid Naser and Shericka Jackson.

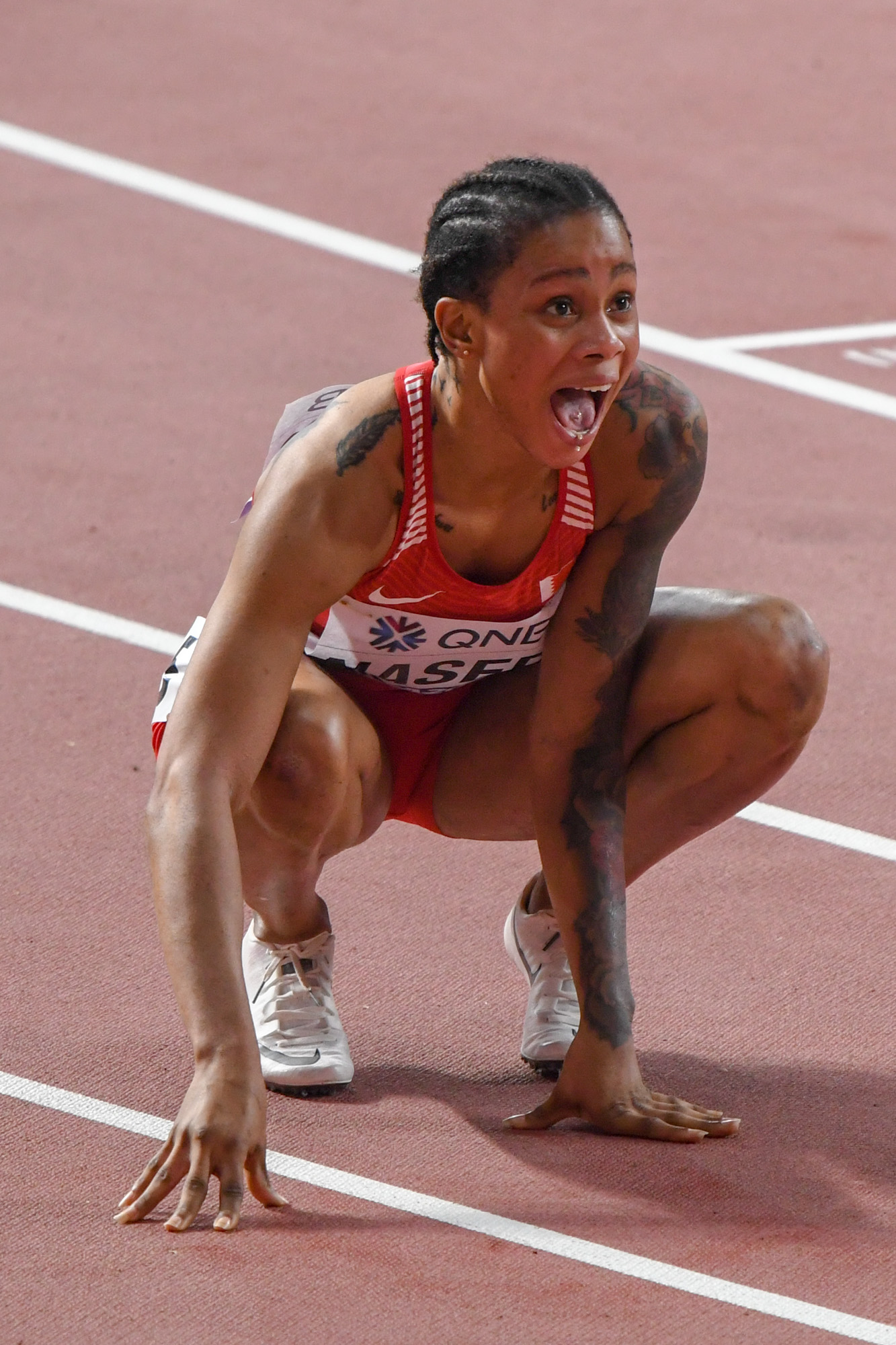
Eid Naser's 48.14 seconds in 2019 in Doha had been the fastest since 1985 – that is for 34 years.

Information from World Athletics profile unless otherwise noted. Last updated on 15 March 2021.

=== Personal bests ===
Event	Time (s)	Wind (m/s)	Venue	Date	Notes
100 metres	11.24	+1.3	Salamanca, Spain	8 June 2019	
200 metres	22.51	+1.9	Palo Alto, CA, United States	30 June 2019	NR
400 metres	48.14	—N/a	Doha, Qatar	3 October 2019	WL Asian record, 3rd all time

Lap times of 48.14 seconds PB run

Lap	Time	diff to prior / 1st / best lap
0–100 m	12.1
100–200	11.1	-8%
200–300	11.9	+7% / -2%
300–400	13.1	+10% / +8% / +18%
100 metres 10.49 s world record benchmark (Note: Griffith-Joyner's 100m WR mark probably strong wind assisted; 2nd all-time best of Elaine Thompson-Herah: 10.54 s) Source

=== Season's best ===
Year	400 m	+/-	%	Notes
2014	52.74	▼	—	PB
2015	51.39	▼1.35	2.6	WYL NU20R, 2nd Asia U18 all time, 10th U18 all time (Note: 1.38 s to 50.01 world under-18 best of Li Jing (1997))
2016	50.88	▼0.51	1.0	NU20R (Note: Injury condition)
2017	49.88	▼1.00	2.0	NU20R AU20R NR, 3rd U20 all time (Note: 0.07 s to 49.81 Asian senior record of Ma Yuqin (1993); 0.46 s to 49.42 world under 20-record of Grit Breuer (1991))
2018	49.08	▼0.80	1.6	AR
2019	48.14	▼0.94	1.9	WL AR, 3rd all time (Note: 0.54 s to 47.60 world record of Marita Koch (1985))
2020–22	—	—	—	
2023	49.78	—	—	
2024	48.53	▼1.25	2.5	
2025	48.19	▼0.34	0.7	

View chart definition.

=== International competitions ===
Year	Competition	Venue	Position	Event	Time	Notes
Representing Bahrain
2014	Arab Junior Championships	Cairo, Egypt	1st	200 m	24.61	
2014	Arab Junior Championships	Cairo, Egypt	1st	400 m	55.72	
2014	Youth Olympic Games	Nanjing, China	2nd	400 m	52.74	SB, PB
2014	Youth Olympic Games	Nanjing, China	3rd	8 × 100 m mixed	1:43.60	(Note: Representing Mixed-NOCs.)
2015	Asian Youth Championships	Doha, Qatar	1st	400 m	53.02	
2015	Asian Youth Championships	Doha, Qatar	3rd	Medley relay	2:19.04	
2015	World Youth Championships	Cali, Colombia	1st	400 m	51.50	PB
2015	Military World Games	Mungyeong, South Korea	1st	400 m	51.39	WYL SB NU20R
2015	Military World Games	Mungyeong, South Korea	3rd	4 × 400 m relay	3:32.62	NR
2016	Asian Indoor Championships	Doha, Qatar	1st	4 × 400 m relay	3:35.07	AR
2016	Olympic Games	Rio de Janeiro, Brazil	8th (sf)	400 m	50.88	SB NU20R (Note: Naser lost the final qualification by one place – 0.13 s. However, the time ranks her sixth in the final results.)
2017	Islamic Solidarity Games	Baku, Azerbaijan	1st	400 m	51.33	GR
2017	Islamic Solidarity Games	Baku, Azerbaijan	1st	4 × 100 m relay	44.98	GR NR
2017	Islamic Solidarity Games	Baku, Azerbaijan	1st	4 × 400 m relay	3:32.96	GR
2017	World Championships	London, United Kingdom	2nd	400 m	50.06	NU20R NR
2018	Asian Games	Jakarta, Indonesia	1st	400 m	50.09	GR
2018	Asian Games	Jakarta, Indonesia	1st	4 × 100 m relay	42.73	GR
2018	Asian Games	Jakarta, Indonesia	2nd	4 × 400 m relay	3:30.61	
2018	Asian Games	Jakarta, Indonesia	— (f)	4 × 400 m mixed	DQ	
2018	Continental Cup	Ostrava, Czech Republic	1st	400 m	49.32	(Note: Representing Asia-Pacific.)
2019	Arab Championships	Cairo, Egypt	1st	200 m	23.45	
2019	Arab Championships	Cairo, Egypt	1st	400 m	52.72	
2019	Arab Championships	Cairo, Egypt	1st	4 × 100 m relay	45.18	
2019	Asian Championships	Doha, Qatar	1st	200 m	22.74	PB CR
2019	Asian Championships	Doha, Qatar	1st	400 m	51.34	
2019	Asian Championships	Doha, Qatar	3rd	4 × 100 m relay	43.61	
2019	Asian Championships	Doha, Qatar	1st	4 × 400 m relay	3:32.10	
2019	Asian Championships	Doha, Qatar	1st	4 × 400 m mixed	3:15.75	
2019	World Championships	Doha, Qatar	1st	400 m	48.14	WL SB AR, 3rd all time
2019	World Championships	Doha, Qatar	3rd	4 × 400 m mixed	3:11.82	AR
2019	Military World Games	Wuhan, China	—	200 m	DQ (h)	
2019	Military World Games	Wuhan, China	1st	400 m	50.15	GR
2019	Military World Games	Wuhan, China	3rd	4 × 100 m relay	44.24	
2023	Asian Games	Hangzhou, China	—	200 m	DQ (f)	
2023	Asian Games	Hangzhou, China	2nd	400 m	50.92	
2023	Asian Games	Hangzhou, China	1st	4 × 400 m relay	3:27.65	GR
2023	Asian Games	Hangzhou, China	1st	4 × 400 m mixed	3:14.02	
2024	World Relays	Nassau, Bahamas	15th (rep)	4 × 400 m mixed	3:18.21	SB
2024	Olympic Games	Paris, France	2nd	400 m	48.53	SB
2025	World Championships	Tokyo, Japan	3rd	400 m	48.19	
2025	Islamic Solidarity Games	Riyadh, Saudi Arabia	2nd	200 m	23.52	
2025	Islamic Solidarity Games	Riyadh, Saudi Arabia	1st	400 m	51.59	
2025	Islamic Solidarity Games	Riyadh, Saudi Arabia	2nd	4 × 400 m mixed	3:17.28	
2026	World Ultimate Championship	Budapest, Hungary	8th	400 m	50.22	
2026	Asian Games	Nagoya, Japan	1st	400 m	49.20	GR
2026	Asian Games	Nagoya, Japan	5th (h)	4 × 100 m mixed	42.18	
2026	Asian Games	Nagoya, Japan	— (f)	4 × 100 m relay	DNF	
2026	Asian Games	Nagoya, Japan	1st	4 × 400 m mixed	3:12.87	GR
2026	Asian Games	Nagoya, Japan	2nd	4 × 400 m relay	3:30.21	

=== Circuit performances ===
==== Wins and titles ====
- Diamond League 400 metres champion: 2018, 2019
  - 2017 (1) (400 m): Birmingham British Grand Prix (50.59)
  - 2018 (6) (400 m): Rome Golden Gala (50.51), Oslo Bislett Games (49.98), Stockholm Bauhaus-Galan (49.84), Paris Meeting (49.55 AR), Lausanne Athletissima (49.78), Brussels Memorial Van Damme (49.33)
  - 2019 (5) (400 m): Shanghai Diamond League (50.65), Rome Golden Gala (50.26), Rabat Meeting (50.13), Lausanne Athletissima (49.17 MR), Zürich Weltklasse (50.24)
- World Challenge meets
  - 2018 (1) (400 m): Zagreb Hanžeković Memorial (50.54)
- Other meets
  - 2015 [2]; (1) (100 m): Ruen Cup; (1) (400 m): Ruen Cup
  - 2016 (1) (400 m): Stara Zagora Meeting (51.63)
  - 2017 (1) (400 m): Doha Meeting (54.35)
  - 2019 [4]; (1) (100 m) Salamanca Memorial; (2) (200 m): Salamanca Memorial, Barcelona Meeting; (1) (400 m): Székesfehérvár Memorial (50.13)
  - 2025 Kingston Slam (400 m) (48.67)

== See also ==
- 400 metres at the World Athletics Championships
- List of World Championships in Athletics medalists (women)

== Notes ==
Records
Preceded by (China) Ma Yuqin	Women's 400 m Asian record holder 30 June 2018 – present	Succeeded by Incumbent
