= Athletics at the 2022 Asian Games – Mixed 4 × 400 metres relay =

Mixed 4 × 400 metres relay at the 2022 Asian Games
- Venue: Hangzhou Olympic Expo Main Stadium
- Date: 2 October 2023
- Competitors: 20 from 5 nations

Medalists
| gold medal | Bahrain; Musa Isah, Kemi Adekoya, Abbas Yusuf Ali, Salwa Eid Naser |
| silver medal | India; Muhammad Ajmal Variyathodi, Vithya Ramraj, Rajesh Ramesh, Subha Venkatesan |
| bronze medal | Kazakhstan; Yefim Tarassov, Adelina Zems, Dmitriy Koblov, Alexandra Zalyubovskaya |

The mixed 4 × 400 metres relay competition at the 2022 Asian Games took place on 2 October 2023 at the HOC Stadium, Hangzhou.

The Sri Lankan team originally clinched silver but was disqualified due to lane infringement

== Schedule ==
All times are China Standard Time (UTC+08:00)

| Date | Time | Event |
|---|---|---|
| Monday, 2 October 2023 | 20:40 | Final |

== Records ==
Prior to this competition, the existing world, Asian and Games records were as follows.

| World Record | United States | 3:08.80 | Budapest, Hungary | 19 August 2023 |
| Asian Record | Bahrain | 3:11.82 | Doha, Qatar | 29 September 2019 |
| Games Record | India | 3:15.71 | Jakarta, Indonesia | 28 August 2018 |

== Results ==
Legend

- DSQ — Disqualified

| Rank | Team | Time | Notes |
|---|---|---|---|
| 1st place, gold medalist(s) | Bahrain (BRN); Musa Isah; Kemi Adekoya; Abbas Yusuf Ali; Salwa Eid Naser | 3:14.02 | GR |
| 2nd place, silver medalist(s) | India (IND); Muhammad Ajmal Variyathodi; Vithya Ramraj; Rajesh Ramesh; Subha Venkatesan | 3:14.34 | |
| 3rd place, bronze medalist(s) | Kazakhstan (KAZ); Yefim Tarassov; Adelina Zems; Dmitriy Koblov; Alexandra Zalyubovskaya | 3:24.85 | |
| 4 | Thailand (THA); Ruamchok Semathong; Sukanya Janchaona; Jirateep Bundee; Benny Nontanam | 3:26.81 | |
| — | Sri Lanka (SRI); Aruna Darshana; Nadeesha Ramanayake; Kalinga Kumarage; Tharushi Karunarathna | DSQ | |
