= Sri Lanka at the 2022 Asian Games =

- IOC code: SRI
- NOC: National Olympic Committee of Sri Lanka

in Hangzhou, China 23 September 2023 – 8 October 2023
- Competitors: 84+12 in 20+1 (Note: 12 rugby sevens athletes officially competed as Independent Athletes (OCA) competing under the Olympic Council of Asia flag) sports
- Flag bearers (opening): Anura Rohana; Gayanthika Abeyratne
- Flag bearer (closing): TBD
- Officials: 57
- Medals Ranked 26th: Gold 1 Silver 2 Bronze 2 Total 5

Asian Games appearances (overview)
- 1951; 1954; 1958; 1962; 1966; 1970; 1974; 1978; 1982; 1986; 1990; 1994; 1998; 2002; 2006; 2010; 2014; 2018; 2022; 2026

Sri Lanka competed at the 2022 Asian Games in Hangzhou, China from September 23 to October 8, 2023. This was Sri Lanka's 19th appearance at the Asian Games, having competed at every Games since the second edition in 1951.

Originally on July 26, 2023, a team of 96 athletes (62 men and 34 women) were named to the team competing in 21 sports. A total of 57 officials (including coaches) were also included in the final delegation. In September 2023, two track and field athletes withdrew due to injury, while a male artistic gymnast was added, bringing the final team to 95 athletes (61 men and 34 women). The 95 athletes marked a decline of 78 athletes from the 2018 Asian Games, because the country chose only athletes with medal winning possibilities.

On September 14, 2023 it was announced golfer Anura Rohana and athlete Gayanthika Abeyratne would be the country's flagbearers during the opening ceremony. At the age of 52, Rohana became the oldest flagbearer in Asian Games history.

== Competitors ==
The following is the list of number of competitors (per gender) participating at the games per sport/discipline.

Officially competing under Sri Lanka

Sport	Men	Women	Total
Archery	2	1	3
Athletics	6	8	14
Badminton	1	0	1
Beach volleyball	0	2	2
Boxing	2	0	2
Chess	1	0	1
Cricket	15	15	30
Esports	4	0	4
Golf	4	0	4
Gymnastics	1	0	1
Judo	1	0	1
Karate	1	1	2
Rowing	2	2	4
Sailing	1	1	2
Squash	2	1	3
Swimming	2	1	3
Taekwondo	1	1	2
Weightlifting	2	0	2
Wushu	2	0	2
Wrestling	0	1	1
Total	50	34	84

Competing under Independent Athletes

Sport	Men	Women	Total
Rugby sevens	12	0	12

== Archery ==
Sri Lanka entered three archers (two men and one woman).

Athlete	Event	Ranking round		Round of 64	Round of 32	Round of 16	Quarterfinals	Semifinals	Final / BM	
Athlete	Event	Score	Seed	Opposition Score	Opposition Score	Opposition Score	Opposition Score	Opposition Score	Opposition Score	Rank
Sajeev De Silva	Men's individual recurve	614	69	Zhangbyrbay (KAZ); L 5-6	Did not advance					
Wasantha Kumara	Men's individual compound	554	53	Jamiyangombo (MGL); W139-137	Chang (TPE); L128-148	Did not advance				
Anuradha Karunaratne	Women's individual compound	623	51	Al-Najjar (UAE); W135-127	Vennam (IND); L132-145	Did not advance				

== Athletics ==
Sri Lanka entered 16 athletes (eight per gender). Later Yupun Abeykoon and Ushan Thiwanka withdrew due to injury. This reduced the final team to 14 athletes (six men and eight women).

Track & road events

Athlete	Event	Heats		Final	
Athlete	Event	Result	Rank	Result	Rank
Aruna Darshana	Men's 400 m	46.07	3 q	46.09	6
Kalinga Kumarage	Men's 400 m	45.57	1 Q	46.22	7
Aruna Darshana; Dinuka Deshan; Pasindu Kodikara; Kalinga Kumarage; Pabasara Niku; Rajitha Rajakaruna	Men's 4 × 400 m relay	3:06.60	2 Q	3:02.55	3rd place, bronze medalist(s)
Tharushi Karunarathna; Nadeesha Ramanayake; Jayeshi Uththara; Lakshima Mendis	Women's 4 × 400 m relay	—N/a		3:30.88 NR	3rd place, bronze medalist(s)
Rumeshika Ratnayake	Women's 200 m	24.51	3	Did not advance	
Nadeesha Ramanayake	Women's 400 m	52.67	2 Q	52.72	5
Gayanthika Abeyratne	Women's 800 m	2:07.17	Q	2:05.87	8
Tharushi Karunarathna	Women's 800 m	2:05.48	Q	2:03.20	1st place, gold medalist(s)
Gayanthika Abeyratne	Women's 1500 m	—N/a		4:18.77	4
Aruna Darshana; Kalinga Kumarage; Rajitha Rajakaruna; Gayanthika Abeyratne; Tharushi Karunarathna; Nadeesha Ramanayake	Mixed 4 × 400 m relay	—N/a		~~3:14.25~~DSQ	~~2nd~~

Field events
Women

Athlete	Event	Final	
Athlete	Event	Distance	Rank
Sarangi Silva	Long jump	6.14	6
Dilhani Lekamge	Javelin throw	61.57 NR	2nd place, silver medalist(s)

== Badminton ==
Sri Lanka entered one male badminton athlete.

Singles

Athlete	Event	Round of 64	Round of 32	Round of 16	Quarterfinals	Semifinals	Final	Rank
Athlete	Event	Opposition Score	Opposition Score	Opposition Score	Opposition Score	Opposition Score	Opposition Score	Rank
Viren Nettasinghe	Men's	Gurung (BHU); W 2-0	Enkhbat (MGL); W 2-0	Chou (TPE); L0-2	Did not advance			

== Beach volleyball ==
Sri Lanka entered one female pair.

Athletes	Event	Preliminary Round					Round of 16	Quarterfinals	Semifinals	Finals	Rank
Athletes	Event	Opposition Score	Opposition Score	Opposition Score	Opposition Score	Rank	Opposition Score	Opposition Score	Opposition Score	Opposition Score	Rank
Deepika Bandara; Chaturika Weerasinghe	Women's	Xue / Xia (CHN); L 0–2 (5–21, 8–21)	Ivanchenko / Kabulbekova (KAZ); L 1–2 (12–21, 21–12, 8–15)	Shin / Kim (KOR); W 2–0 (25–23, 21–12)	Eslapor / Rodriguez (PHI); L 0–2 (10–21, 17–21)	4 Q	Naraphornrapat / Kongphopsarutawadee (THA); L 0–2 (10–21, 10–21)	Did not advance			9

== Boxing ==
Sri Lanka entered two male boxers.

Men

Athlete	Event	Round of 32	Round of 16	Quarterfinals	Semifinals	Final	Rank
Athlete	Event	Opposition Result	Opposition Result	Opposition Result	Opposition Result	Opposition Result	Rank
Rukmal Prasanna	−57 kg	Salim Hossain (BAN); L 2–3	Did not advance				
Niraj Wijewardane	−71 kg	Bye	Kan Chia-wei (TPE); L 0–5	Did not advance			

== Chess ==
Sri Lanka entered one male chess player.

Men

- Susal de Silva

== Cricket ==
Sri Lanka entered one men's and women's teams (each consisting of 15 athletes) for a total of 30 competitors.

Summary

Team	Event	Group stage			Qualifier	Quarterfinal	Semifinal	Final / BM / Pl.	
Team	Event	Opposition Result	Opposition Result	Rank	Opposition Result	Opposition Result	Opposition Result	Opposition Result	Rank
Sri Lanka women's	Women's tournament	Bye	—N/a		Bye	Thailand; W by 8 wickets 84/2–78/7	Pakistan; W by 6 wickets 77/4–75/9	India; L by 19 runs	2nd place, silver medalist(s)
Sri Lanka Men's	Men's tournament	Bye	—N/a			Afghanistan; L by 8 runs	Did not advance		

=== Men's tournament ===
The Sri Lankan men's team consisted of 15 athletes. The team named was a second string team.

Roster

- Lasith Croospulle
- Shevon Daniel
- Ashen Bandara
- Sahan Arachchige
- Ahan Wickramasinghe
- Lahiru Udara
- Ravindu Fernando
- Ranitha Liyanarachchi
- Nuwanidu Fernando
- Sachitha Jayatilaka
- Vijayakanth Viyaskanth
- Nimesh Vimukthi
- Lahiru Samarakoon
- Nuwan Thushara
- Isitha Wijesundera

=== Women's tournament ===
The Sri Lankan women's team consisted of 15 athletes.

Roster

- Chamari Athapaththu
- Harshitha Samarawickrama
- Vishmi Gunaratne
- Nilakshi de Silva
- Kaveesha Dilhari
- Imesha Dulani
- Anushka Sanjeewani
- Oshadi Ranasinghe
- Sugandika Kumari
- Inoka Ranaweera
- Udeshika Prabodhani
- Hasini Perera
- Kaushini Nuthyangana
- Achini Kulasooriya
- Inoshi Fernando

Quarterfinals

22 September
9:00
Scorecard

Thailand; 78/7 (15 overs)	v	Sri Lanka; 84/2 (10.5 overs)
Chanida Sutthiruang 31* (24); Inoshi Priyadharshani 4/10 (3 overs)		Anushka Sanjeewani 32 (23); Thipatcha Putthawong 2/21 (3 overs)

Sri Lanka won by 8 wickets
ZJUT Cricket Field, Hangzhou
Umpires: Narayanan Sivan (MAS) and Vrinda Rathi (IND)

- Sri Lanka won the toss and elected to field.
- The match was reduced to 15 overs per side due to rain.

Semifinals

24 September
14:00
Scorecard

Pakistan; 75/9 (20 overs)	v	Sri Lanka; 77/4 (16.3 overs)
Shawaal Zulfiqar 16 (27); Udeshika Prabodhani 3/21 (4 overs)		Harshitha Samarawickrama 23 (41); Sadia Iqbal 1/13 (4 overs)

Sri Lanka won by 6 wickets
ZJUT Cricket Field, Hangzhou
Umpires: Masudur Rahman (BAN) and Mahmood Kharoti (AFG)

- Sri Lanka won the toss and elected to field.

Final

25 September
14:00
Scorecard

India; 116/7 (20 overs)	v	Sri Lanka; 97/8 (20 overs)
Smriti Mandhana 46 (45); Udeshika Prabodhani 2/16 (3 overs)		Hasini Perera 25 (22); Titas Sadhu 3/6 (4 overs)

India won by 19 runs
ZJUT Cricket Field, Hangzhou
Umpires: Masudur Rahman (BAN) and Mahmood Kharoti (AFG)

- India won the toss and elected to bat.

== Esports ==
Sri Lanka entered four male esports competitors.

Men

- Chamuditha Watshan
- Rizny Azmy
- Riham Ramzi
- Ramesh Kavindu

== Golf ==
Sri Lanka entered four male golfers.

Men

Athlete(s)	Event	Final						
Athlete(s)	Event	Round 1	Round 2	Round 3	Round 4	Total	To par	Rank
Kandasamy Prabagaran	Individual	72	78	Did not advance		150	+6	=59
Thangaraja Nadaraja	Individual	70	71	75	72	288	E	=34
Mithun Perera	Individual	72	73	Did not advance		145	+1	=59
Anura Rohana	Individual	71	74	Did not advance		145	+1	=59
Prabagaran Kandasamy; Thangaraja Nadaraja; Mithun Perera; Anura Rohana	Team	213	218	Did not advance		431	-1	13

== Gymnastics ==
=== Artistic ===
Sri Lanka entered one male artistic gymnast after entries were closed.

Men

Athlete	Event	Qualification								Final							
Athlete	Event	Apparatus						Total	Rank	Apparatus						Total	Rank
Athlete	Event	F	PH	R	V	PB	HB	Total	Rank	F	PH	R	V	PB	HB	Total	Rank
Nadila Nethviru	All-around	11.866	10.266	10.866	13.433	12.800	10.733	69.964	17 Q	12.033	10.100	10.333	13.500	12.833	12.266	71.065	17

== Judo ==
Sri Lanka entered one judoka.

Men

- Chamara Repiyallage

== Karate ==
Sri Lanka entered two karateka (one per gender).

Men

- Denetha Avihinsa

Women

- Heshani Hettiarachchi

== Rowing ==
Sri Lanka entered four rowers (two per gender).

Athletes	Event	Heats		Repechage		Semifinals		Final	
Athletes	Event	Time	Rank	Time	Rank	Time	Rank	Time	Rank
Mohamed Nafiran	Men's single sculls	7:37.03	4 R	7:48.92	2 SA/B	7:57.55	5 FB	7:39.20	10
Mohamed Nafiran; Nuwan Ekanayaka Mudiyanselage	Men's double sculls	7:01.92	4 R	7:23.07	4 FB	—N/a		7:05.08	9
Maheshi Bhadra	Women's single sculls	8:53.68	3 SA/B	Bye		8:57.65	5 FB	8:36.99	11
Maheshi Bhadra; Jayani Hirunika	Women's double sculls	7:50.29	5 R	8:20.63	5 FB	—N/a		8:03.66	10

== Sailing ==
Sri Lanka entered two sailors (one per gender).

Athlete	Event	Race											Total Points	Net Points	Final Rank
Athlete	Event	1	2	3	4	5	6	7	8	9	10	M	Total Points	Net Points	Final Rank
Tharen Nanayakkara	Boy's ICLA4	11	11	10	11	11	11								
Arianna Tranchell	Girl's ICLA4	6	7	6	3	6	7								

== Squash ==
Sri Lanka entered three squash athletes (two men and one woman).

Men

- Ravindu Laksiri
- Shamil Wakeel

Women

- Chanithma Sinaly

== Swimming ==
Sri Lanka entered three swimmers (two men and one woman).

Men

- Matthew Abeysinghe
- Akalanka Peris

Women

- Ganga Seneviratne

== Non-participating sports ==
Sri Lanka qualified both its men's and women's teams for the field hockey competitions. The National Sports Selection Committee of Sri Lanka (NSSC) decided to withdraw both teams due to the economic crisis facing Sri Lanka and lack of medal chances.

== See also ==
- Sri Lanka at the 2022 Commonwealth Games
