= Haruna Kuboyama =

Japanese sprinter (born 1996)

Personal information
- Native name: Japanese: 久保山 晴菜
- Nationality: Japan
- Born: 5 April 1996 (age 30)
- Home town: Saga, Japan
- Education: Saga Kita High School; Fukuoka University

Sport
- Sport: Athletics
- Events: 400 metres 100 metres
- Club: Imamura Hospital

Achievements and titles
- National finals: 2021 Japanese Champs; • 400m, 4th; 2022 Japanese Champs; • 400m, 3rd (bronze); 2023 Japanese Champs; • 400m, 1st (gold); • 200m, 3rd (bronze)
- Personal bests: 100m: 11.55 (+1.5) (2022) 400m: 53.07 (2023)
Medal record
Women's athletics
Representing Japan
Asian Championships
Bronze medal – third place	2023 Bangkok	400 m
Bronze medal – third place	2023 Bangkok	4 × 400 m mixed
- Updated on 20 April 2024

Haruna Kuboyama (Japanese: 久保山 晴菜; born 5 April 1996) is a Japanese sprinter specializing in the 400 metres. She was the 2023 Japanese Champion in the 400 m, and won a bronze medal in the mixed 4 × 400 m relay at the 2023 Asian Championships.

== Career ==
Beginning as a short sprinter as early as 2014, Kuboyama won the 2018 Japanese University Championships in the 100 metres, running 11.86 into a -2.1 m/s headwind. At her first Japanese Athletics Championships in 2019, she contested the 100 m and 200 m but did not advance to the finals. She also failed to advance to the 100 m finals at the 2020 Japanese Athletics Championships.

Kuboyama switched events to the 400 metres in 2021, debuting at 54.90 and eventually finishing 4th at the 2021 Japanese Athletics Championships in 53.72. After a 3rd-place 400 m finish at the 2022 Japanese Athletics Championships, Kuboyama was named to the Japanese mixed 4 × 400 m team at the 2022 World Championships as an alternate, but she did not get to compete as Japan did not qualify for the finals.

Kuboyama achieved her best national results in 2023, winning the 400 m at the national championships and placing 3rd in the 200 m. This earned her selection to Japan's 4 × 400 m, individual 400 m, and mixed 4 × 400 m teams at the 2023 Asian Athletics Championships. After finishing 4th in the individual 400 m, she won a bronze medal running second leg of the mixed relay final, setting a Japanese record of 3:15.71 in the process. The following day she also placed 4th leading off the women's 4 × 400 m.

In April 2024, it was revealed that 2023 Asian Championships 400 m silver medallist Fairda Soliyeva of Uzbekistan failed a test for meldonium, disqualifying her and promoting Kuboyama to the bronze medal.

Kuboyama began her 2024 season finishing 4th at the Asian Indoor Athletics Championships in the 400 m. She finished 8th at the 2024 Diamond League Shanghai outdoors.

== Personal life ==
Kuboyama is from Saga, Japan where she attended Saga Kita High School and Fukuoka University. She competes representing Imamura Hospital.

== Statistics ==
=== Personal best progression ===
400m progression
#	Mark	Pl.	Competition	Venue	Date	Ref.
1	54.90	(gold) (Round B)	Shizuoka International Athletics Meet	Fukuroi, Japan	2 May 2021	
2	53.94	3rd place, bronze medalist(s)	Denka Athletics Challenge Cup	Niigata, Japan	5 Jun 2021	
3	53.59	(silver) (Heat 3)	Japanese Athletics Championships	Osaka, Japan	23 Jun 2021	
4	53.32	(gold) (Heat 2)	Japanese Athletics Championships	Osaka, Japan	8 Jun 2022	
5	53.24	1st place, gold medalist(s)	All Japan Corporate Team Championships	Gifu, Japan	23 Sep 2022	
6	53.16	2nd place, silver medalist(s)	Shizuoka International Athletics Meet	Fukuroi, Japan	2 May 2023	
7	53.07	2nd place, silver medalist(s)	Kinami Michitaka Memorial Athletics Meet	Osaka, Japan	5 May 2023	
