= 2018 South Asian U20 Athletics Championships =

Athletics competition in Colombo, Sri Lanka

3rd South Asian U20 Athletics Championships
- Venue: Sugathadasa Stadium
- Location: Colombo, Sri Lanka
- Start date: 5 May 2018
- End date: 6 May 2018
- Competitors: (not specified) from 7 nations

The 2018 South Asian U20 Athletics Championships were held on 5–6 May 2018 at the Sugathadasa Stadium in Colombo, Sri Lanka.

India topped the medal table with 20 gold, 22 silver, and 8 bronze medals, while Sri Lanka followed with 12 gold, 10 silver, and 19 bronze. Pakistan claimed one silver and one bronze, and Bangladesh secured two bronze medals.

A total of 20 meet records were set.

== Medal table ==
* Host nation (Sri Lanka)

Final medal standings
Rank	Nation	Gold	Silver	Bronze	Total
1	India (IND)	20	22	8	50
2	Sri Lanka (SRI)*	12	10	19	41
3	Pakistan (PAK)	0	1	1	2
4	Bangladesh (BAN)	0	0	2	2
5	Maldives (MDV)	0	0	1	1
6	Bhutan (BHU)	0	0	0	0
6	Nepal (NEP)	0	0	0	0
Totals (7 entries)		32	33	31	96

== Results ==
There were two days of competition.

Key: † = Meet record

=== Men ===
Event	Gold		Silver		Bronze	
100 m	Prajwal Mandanna Kakera Ravi; India	10.81	B.D. Chanuka Sandeepa; Sri Lanka	10.88	Akash Kumar; India	10.89
200 m	Aruna Darshana; Sri Lanka	21.50	Nithin S. Balakumar; India	21.63	Akash Kumar; India	21.86
400 m	Aruna Darshana; Sri Lanka	46.55 †	P.M.P.L. Kodikara; Sri Lanka	46.99	G.D.K.K. Pabasara Niku; Sri Lanka	47.43
800 m	D.M.H.S. Karunarathna; Sri Lanka	1:53.35	R.P. Isuru Lakshan; Sri Lanka	1:53.95	Abhinanth Sunderesan; India	1:53.97
1500 m	Ankit; India	3:51.52 †	Ajit Kumar; India	3:53.45	K.A.K. Madushanka; Sri Lanka	4:02.46
5000 m	Ajay Kumar Bind; India	15:08.40	Gurpreet; India	15:32.53	S. Kinthusan; Sri Lanka	16:18.43
110 m hurdles	Kunal Choudhary; India	14.50	Mohammed Fias C India	14.55	Sheshan Dilusha Kariyawasam; Sri Lanka	14.60
400 m hurdles	P.M.P.L. Kodikara; Sri Lanka	52.56 †	Aman; India	52.56 †	Dhval Mahesh Utekar; India	53.35
High Jump	Tharindu Dasun; Sri Lanka	2.04	Gurjeet Singh; India	2.00	S.T. Amarasinghe; Sri Lanka	2.00
Long Jump	Lokesh Sathyanathan; India	7.74 †	Rishabh Rishishwar; India	7.43	K.T. Pramod Madubasha; Sri Lanka	7.02
Triple Jump	Kamalraj Kanagaraj; India	16.05 †	Ashutosh Chouhan; India	15.37	Jeramy Stanislaus; Sri Lanka	14.79
Shot Put (6 kg)	Ashish Bhalothia; India	18.53 †	Sahib Singh; India	17.75	W.M.A. Manesh Malintha; Sri Lanka	14.97
Discus Throw (1.75 kg)	Ajay; India	50.11	N.P. Lahiru Keshan Pathirana; Sri Lanka	47.37	Ashish Bhalothia; India	46.52
Javelin throw	Arshdeep Singh; India	71.47 †	R.D. Pragathi Prasanna Ranawaka; Sri Lanka	61.71	W.S. Anjana Fonseka; Sri Lanka	60.47
4×100 m relay	India	42.85	Pakistan	43.03	Maldives	44.68
4×400 m relay	Sri Lanka	3:08.21 †	India	3:09.33	Pakistan	3:22.98

=== Women ===
Event	Gold		Silver		Bronze	
100 m	Shelinda Jansen; Sri Lanka	12.30	TMMP Weerasooriya; Sri Lanka	12.43	Sadeepa Henderson; Sri Lanka	12.43
200 m	TMMP Weerasooriya; Sri Lanka	25.04	Shelinda Jansen; Sri Lanka	25.07	Sadeepa Henderson; Sri Lanka	25.53
400 m	Shayamali Kumarasinghe; Sri Lanka	54.47 †	Subha Venkatesan; India	55.18	Rachna Gujar; India	55.70
800 m	B.M.N.D. Pabasani; Sri Lanka	2:14.15	Laxmipriya Kisan; India	2:14.85	Mahima Devi; India	2:15.30
1500 m	AMGDDF Amalie Perera; Sri Lanka	4:50.01	Vinita Gurjar; India	4:53.63	T.G.H. Dulanjana Pradeepani; Sri Lanka	4:59.39
3000 m	Prachi Ankush; India	9:57.26	Shilpa Dihora; India	10:04.23	T.G.H. Dulanjana Pradeepani; Sri Lanka	10:39.39
100 m hurdles	Sapna Kumari; India	14.19 †	Pragyan Prasant Sahu; India	14.98	N.G.P.R. Gunathilaka; Sri Lanka	15.25
400 m hurdles	B.M.N.D. Pabasani; Sri Lanka	1:05.12	T.G.H. Dulanjana Pradeepani; Sri Lanka	1:06.50	Keerthika Vel; India	1:06.89
High Jump	Amasha De Silva; Sri Lanka	1.75 †	TMMP Weerasooriya; Sri Lanka	1.65	Chaitrali Gujar; India	1.60
Long Jump	Prathiksha Yamuna; India	5.79	N. Lakshanya; India	5.75	H.R. Dhananjana Sithmini; Sri Lanka	5.73
Triple Jump	Rishika Awasthi; India	12.76	M. Dilki Nehara; Sri Lanka	12.32	Anisha Tharu; Nepal	NM
Shot Put (4 kg)	Kiran Baliyan; India	14.77 †	Anamika Das; India	14.54	Sarisha Gunasekera; Sri Lanka	11.51
Discus Throw (1 kg)	Arpandeep Kaur Bajwa; India	48.60 †	Amanat Kamboj; India	48.38	J.H. Gauranganie Savindhaya; India	37.95
Javelin throw	Sanjana Choudhary; India	48.08 †	Deepika; India	46.27	W.G. Nisansala Madubash; Sri Lanka	35.02
4×100 m relay	India	45.08	Sri Lanka	46.48	Maldives	48.04
4×400 m relay	India	3:44.35	Sri Lanka	3:49.99	Bangladesh	3:57.37
