= Tharushi Karunarathna =

Sri Lankan athlete (born 2004)

Personal information
- Full name: Dissanayaka Mudiyanselage Tharushi Dilsara Karunaratne
- Born: 18 November 2004 (age 21) Menikhinna, Sri Lanka
- Education: Bachelor of Business Management; Mays Business School
- Height: 1.61 m (5 ft 3 in)

Sport
- Sport: Track and field
- Events: 400 m, 800 m

Achievements and titles
- Personal bests: 400 m: 52.48 (2024); 800 m: 2:00.66 NR NU20R (2023)
Medal record
Women's athletics
Representing Sri Lanka
Asian Games
Gold medal – first place	2022 Hangzhou	800 m
Bronze medal – third place	2022 Hangzhou	4×400m
Asian Championships
Gold medal – first place	2023 Bangkok	800 m
Silver medal – second place	2023 Bangkok	4×400m
Silver medal – second place	2023 Bangkok	4×400m mixed
Asian U20 Championships
Gold medal – first place	2023 Yecheon	800 m
Gold medal – first place	2023 Yecheon	4×400m mixed
Silver medal – second place	2023 Yecheon	400 m

Dissanayaka Mudiyanselage Tharushi Dilsara Karunaratne (born 18 November 2004) is a Sri Lankan track and field athlete who specializes in the 400 m and 800 m events. Karunarathna represented Sri Lanka in the women's 800 m event at the 2024 Paris Olympics. She currently runs for Texas A&M University and attends Mays Business School there.

== Career ==
Tharushi competed in the 100m and 200m events at her rural school's Inter-House Meet after her first coach, Pushpa Kumudini, noticed her talent. Later, she excelled at circuit meets. Her abilities blossomed when she attended A. Rathnayake Central College in Walala on a sports scholarship and was a member of the 4 × 400 m relay team that won the All-Island School Games in a record time in 2018. Her first significant individual accomplishment was a bronze medal in the 800m at the Junior Nationals that year.

Tharushi won the All-Island School Games in 2020, at the age of 15, after setting new records in the 400m and 800m races in the Under-16 Girls category. She ran personal bests of 56.54 seconds in the 400m and 2 minutes 14.00 seconds in the 800m, both of which were faster than the winners in the older age groups. In 2019, she also set a new 800m record of 2:17.00 at the Sir John Tarbat Meet. In June 2023, she won gold in the 800m women's race at the Asian Under 20 Junior Athletic Championships in Yecheon, South Korea. She also won silver in 400m and gold in 4 × 400 m mixed relay. In the 2023 Asian Athletics Championships, Tharushi recorded a time of 2:00:06 to win gold in the women's 800m race and also set a new Asian record.

She made her Asian Games debut by representing Sri Lanka at the 2022 Asian Games and competed in the women's 800m event. She eventually emerged as the ultimate winner of the competition after completing her run at 2:03.20 minutes. It marked the first instance for Sri Lanka since 2002 (after 21 years) to win a gold medal in Asian Games Athletics event. She also eventually set a new national record in women's 800m event during the course of the event. She was also part of the women's 400m relay team which secured bronze medal in 4 × 400 metres event at 2022 Asian Games by finishing at 3:30.88 minutes.

Before the Olympics, Karunarathna committed to the Tulane Green Wave track and field program to begin during the 2025 season. As of the fall of 2026, she is currently a member of the Texas A&M track and field program.
