= Athletics at the 2022 Asian Games – Women's 400 metres =

Women's 400 metres at the 2022 Asian Games
- Venue: Hangzhou Olympic Expo Main Stadium
- Date: 29–30 September 2023
- Competitors: 18 from 13 nations

Medalists
gold medal	Kemi Adekoya	Bahrain
silver medal	Salwa Eid Naser	Bahrain
bronze medal	Shereen Samson Vallabouy	Malaysia

The women's 400 metres competition at the 2022 Asian Games took place on 29 and 30 September 2023 at the HOC Stadium, Hangzhou.

== Schedule ==
All times are China Standard Time (UTC+08:00)

Date	Time	Event
Friday, 29 September 2023	19:00	Round 1
Saturday, 30 September 2023	20:00	Final

== Records ==
Prior to this competition, the existing world, Asian and Games records were as follows.

World Record	Marita Koch (GDR)	47.60	Canberra, Australia	6 October 1985
Asian Record	Salwa Eid Naser (BRN)	48.14	Doha, Qatar	3 October 2019
Games Record	Salwa Eid Naser (BRN)	50.09	Jakarta, Indonesia	26 August 2018

== Results ==
=== Round 1 ===
- Qualification: First 2 in each heat (Q) and the next 2 fastest (q) advance to the final.

==== Heat 1 ====
Rank	Athlete	Time	Notes
1	Salwa Eid Naser (BRN)	52.52	Q
2	Aishwarya Mishra (IND)	52.73	Q
3	Laylo Allaberganova (UZB)	55.01	q
4	Aishath Himna Hassan (MDV)	56.66	
5	Batboldyn Solongo (MGL)	56.75	
6	Levanita da Costa (TLS)	1:05.16	

==== Heat 2 ====
Rank	Athlete	Time	Notes
1	Kemi Adekoya (BRN)	50.53	Q
2	Nadeesha Ramanayake (SRI)	52.67	Q
3	Hoàng Thị Ánh Thục (VIE)	55.00	q
4	Alexandra Zalyubovskaya (KAZ)	55.39	
5	Benny Nontanam (THA)	56.00	
6	Kristina Pronzhenko (TJK)	57.79	

==== Heat 3 ====
Rank	Athlete	Time	Notes
1	Shereen Samson Vallabouy (MAS)	52.89	Q
2	Hoàng Thị Minh Hạnh (VIE)	53.49	Q
3	Sahib-e-Asra (PAK)	55.18	
4	Himanshi Malik (IND)	57.82	
5	Otgonpüreviin Mönkhtümen (MGL)	58.19	
6	Ziva Moosa Shafeeu (MDV)	59.36	

=== Final ===
Rank	Athlete	Time	Notes
1st place, gold medalist(s)	Kemi Adekoya (BRN)	50.66	
2nd place, silver medalist(s)	Salwa Eid Naser (BRN)	50.92	
3rd place, bronze medalist(s)	Shereen Samson Vallabouy (MAS)	52.58	
4	Aishwarya Mishra (IND)	53.50	
5	Nadeesha Ramanayake (SRI)	53.72	
6	Hoàng Thị Minh Hạnh (VIE)	53.91	
7	Laylo Allaberganova (UZB)	55.18	
8	Hoàng Thị Ánh Thục (VIE)	55.61	
