= Subha Venkatesan =

Indian sprinter (born 1999)

Personal information
- Born: 31 August 1999 (age 27) Tiruchirappalli, Tamil Nadu, India

Sport
- Sport: Track and field
- Event: 400 m

Achievements and titles
- Personal best: 52.34 (2024)
Medal record
Women's athletics
Representing India
Asian Games
Silver medal – second place	2022 Hangzhou	4x400m mixed
Silver medal – second place	2022 Hangzhou	4x400m
Asian Championships
Gold medal – first place	2023 Bangkok	4x400m mixed
Gold medal – first place	2025 Gumi	4x400m mixed
Gold medal – first place	2025 Gumi	4x400m
Bronze medal – third place	2023 Bangkok	4x400m
Asian U20 Championships
Silver medal – second place	2018 Gifu	4x400m
South Asian U20 Championships
Gold medal – first place	2018 Colombo	4x400m
Silver medal – second place	2018 Colombo	400m

Subha Venkatesan (born 31 August 1999) is an Indian sprinter specializing in 400 m events. She has represented India in the 4 × 400 m relay events at the 2020 Tokyo Olympics and the 2024 Paris Olympics.
