= Rajesh Ramesh (athlete) =

Indian sprinter (born 1999)

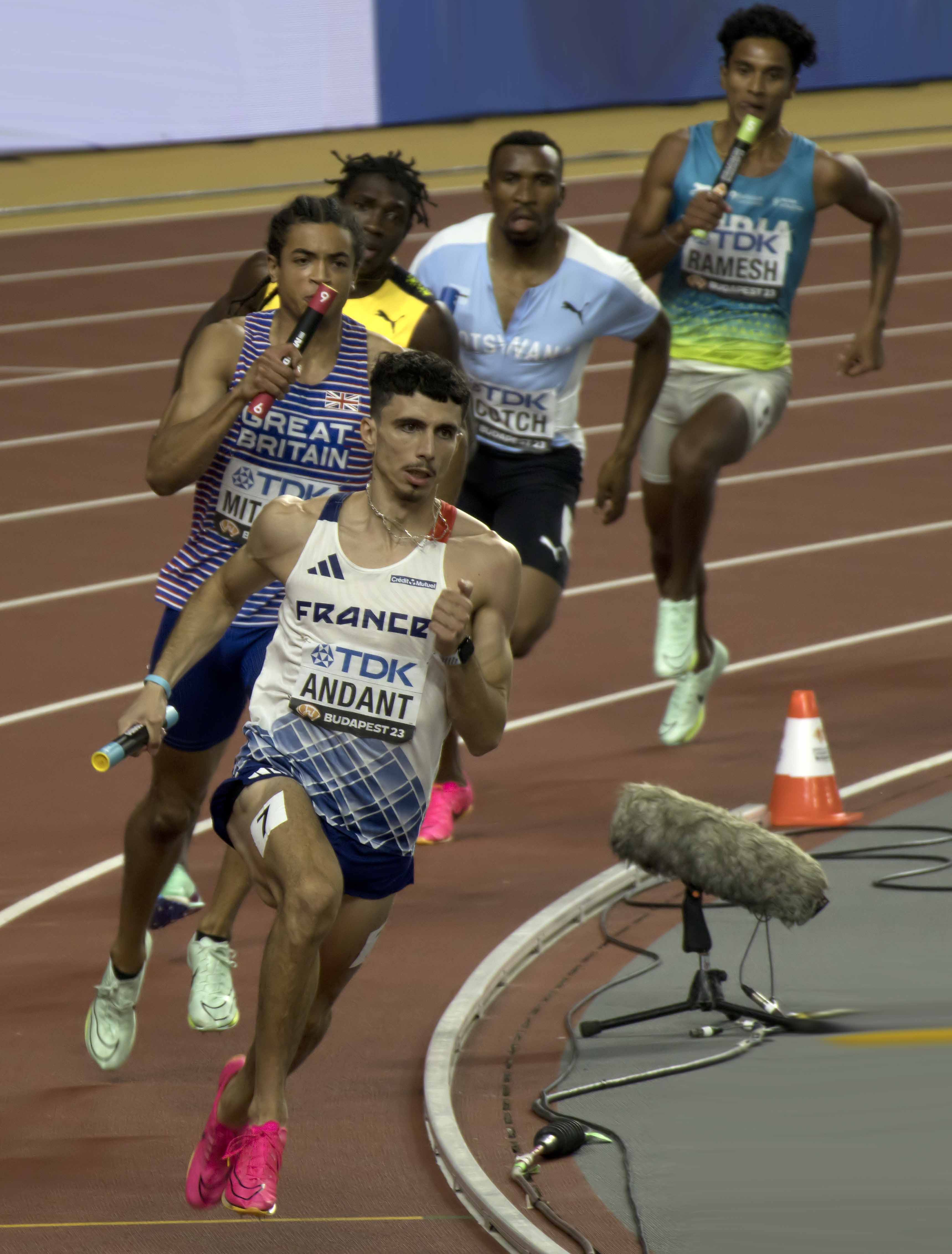
- Rajesh (last) at the 2023 World Championships

Personal information
- Born: 28 March 1999 (age 27) Peralam, Tamil Nadu, India
- Education: DG Vaishnav College
- Occupation: Travelling Ticket Examiner
- Employer: Indian Railways
- Height: 1.74 m (5 ft 9 in)

Sport
- Sport: Athletics
- Event: 400 m

Achievements and titles
- Personal bests: 45.54 (Warsaw, 2024)
Medal record
Men's athletics
Representing India
Asian Games
Gold medal – first place	2022 Hangzhou	4×400m
Silver medal – second place	2022 Hangzhou	4x400m mixed
Bronze medal – third place	2026 Aichi–Nagoya	4×400m
Asian Championships
Gold medal – first place	2023 Bangkok	4×400m mixed
Silver medal – second place	2023 Bangkok	4×400m

Rajesh Ramesh (born 28 March 1999) is an Indian sprinter who specializes in 400 m events. He represented India in the men's 4 × 400 m relay at the 2024 Paris Olympics.

== Career ==
Rajesh won a gold medal in the 4 × 400 m relay and a silver medal in the 4 × 400 m mixed relay at the 2022 Asian Games.

At the 2023 Asian Championships, he was a member of the teams that won a gold medal in the 4 × 400 m mixed relay and a silver medal in the 4 × 400 m relay.

He also competed in the 4 × 400 m relay at the 2023 World Championships, reaching the final after having set an Asian record of 2:59.05 in the heats, the team ultimately finished sixth.

Rajesh was a key member of the Indian men's 4 × 400 m relay team at the 2024 Paris Olympics, and ran the final leg of the relay, completing his segment in 45.21. The team finished fourth in their heat with a time of 3:00.58, season's best for the team, but did not advance to the final.
