= Aishwarya Mishra =

Indian athlete from Maharashtra

Personal information
- Full name: Aishwarya Kailash Mishra
- Born: 16 August 1997 (age 28) Mumbai, Maharashtra, India
- Education: Bachelor of Commerce; Thakur College

Sport
- Sport: Track and field
- Event: 400 m

Achievements and titles
- Personal best: 51.12 (2025)
Medal record
Women's athletics
Representing India
Asian Games
Silver medal – second place	2022 Hangzhou	4x400m
Asian Championships
Gold medal – first place	2023 Bangkok	4x400m mixed
Silver medal – second place	2023 Bangkok	400m
Bronze medal – third place	2023 Bangkok	4x400m

Aishwarya Kailash Mishra (born 16 August 1997) is an Indian track and field athlete who specializes in 400 m.

== Career ==
At the 2022 Asian Games, Mishra narrowly missed the podium, with a fourth place finish in the women’s 400 m event. She later secured a silver medal as part of India’s women’s 4×400 m relay team.

She clocked 47.90s in the 4 × 400 m relay at Chandigarh. Her best in 4 × 400 m relay mixed event came at Supachalasai National Stadium, Bangkok in July. She was part of the 4 × 400 m relay team that clocked 3:30.41, her personal best, at Mahinda Rajapaksha Stadium, Diyagama, Sri Lanka.

Earlier in July 2023, she also won a bronze medal in 400m at the Asian Athletics Championships at Supachalasai National Stadium, Bangkok.

In May 2023, she won the gold in 400m at the 26th National Federation Cup Senior Athletics Championships, Birsa Munda Foot Ball Stadium, Morabadi, Ranchi.

In March 2022, she clocked her best 2:06.44, in 800m at Patiala.

== Controversy ==
In April 2022, following the Federation Cup in Kozhikode, Aishwarya Mishra was unavailable for a mandatory dope test, which led to reports that she had gone missing. She later clarified that her absence was due to attending to her ailing grandmother. Mishra subsequently returned to competition at the National Inter-State Senior Athletics Championships held in June 2022.
