= Athletics at the 2022 Asian Games – Women's 4 × 400 metres relay =

Women's 4 × 400 metres relay at the 2022 Asian Games
- Venue: Hangzhou Olympic Expo Main Stadium
- Date: 4 October 2023
- Competitors: 28 from 7 nations

Medalists
gold medal	Bahrain; Muna Saad Mubarak, Kemi Adekoya, Zenab Moussa Mahamat, Salwa Eid Naser
silver medal	India; Vithya Ramraj, Aishwarya Mishra, Prachi Choudhary, Subha Venkatesan
bronze medal	Sri Lanka; Nadeesha Ramanayake, Jayeshi Uththara, Lakshima Mendis, Tharushi Karunarathna

The women's 4 × 400 metres relay competition at the 2022 Asian Games took place on 4 October 2023 at the HOC Stadium, Hangzhou.

== Schedule ==
All times are China Standard Time (UTC+08:00)

Date	Time	Event
Wednesday, 4 October 2023	20:15	Final

== Records ==
Prior to this competition, the existing world, Asian and Games records were as follows.

World Record	Soviet Union	3:15.17	Seoul, South Korea	1 October 1988
Asian Record	China	3:24.28	Beijing, China	13 September 1993
Games Record	India	3:28.68	Incheon, South Korea	2 October 2014

== Results ==
Rank	Team	Time	Notes
1st place, gold medalist(s)	Bahrain (BRN); Muna Saad Mubarak; Kemi Adekoya; Zenab Moussa Mahamat; Salwa Eid Naser	3:27.65	GR
2nd place, silver medalist(s)	India (IND); Vithya Ramraj; Aishwarya Mishra; Prachi Choudhary; Subha Venkatesan	3:27.85	
3rd place, bronze medalist(s)	Sri Lanka (SRI); Nadeesha Ramanayake; Jayeshi Uththara; Lakshima Mendis; Tharushi Karunarathna	3:30.88	
4	Vietnam (VIE); Nguyễn Thị Ngọc; Hoàng Thị Minh Hạnh; Nguyễn Thị Huyền; Nguyễn Thị Hằng	3:31.61	
5	Philippines (PHI); Robyn Lauren Brown; Angel Frank; Maureen Schrijvers; Lauren Hoffman	3:40.78	
6	Thailand (THA); Sukanya Janchaona; Benny Nontanam; Montida Thongprachukaew; Angkana Thongtae	3:50.44	
7	Mongolia (MGL); Otgonpüreviin Mönkhtümen; Batboldyn Solongo; Enkhbaataryn Sarangua; Zuunnastyn Gankhishig	3:52.33	
