= Nanako Matsumoto =

Japanese athlete (born 1996)

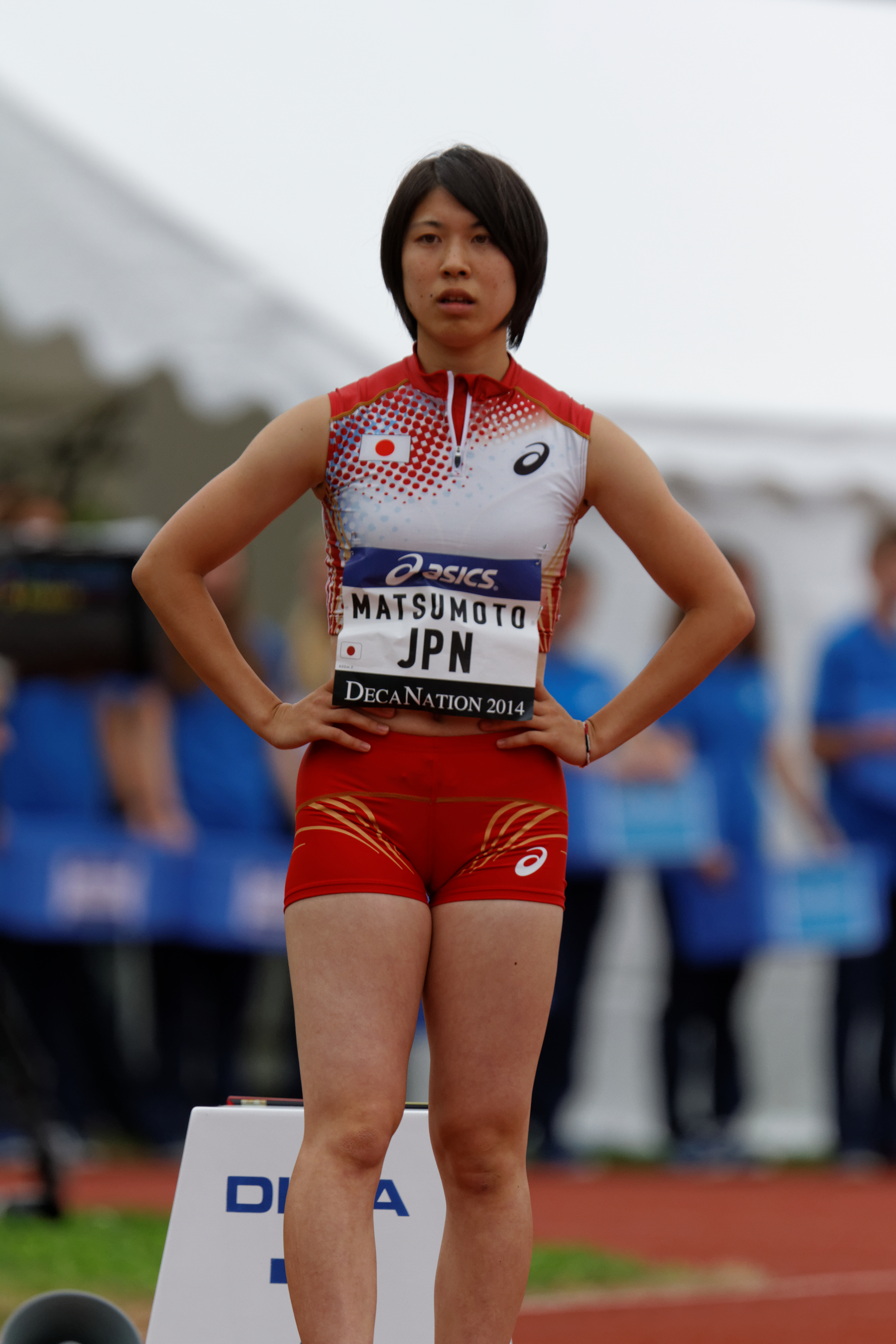
- Matsumoto in 2014

Personal information
- Born: 3 September 1996 (age 29)

Sport
- Sport: Athletics
- Event: Sprint

Achievements and titles
- Personal bests: 200m: 23.66 (2025); 400m: 52.14 (2025); Indoors; 400m: 53.15 (2025) NR
Medal record
Women's athletics
Representing Japan
Asian Games
Silver medal – second place	2014 Incheon	4 × 400 m relay
Asian Championships
Gold medal – first place	2025 Gumi	400 m
Bronze medal – third place	2023 Bangkok	4×400 metres mixed relay
Asian Indoor Championships
Gold medal – first place	2024 Tehran	400 m

Nanako Matsumoto (born 3 September 1996) is a Japanese sprinter. She is the 2025 Asian champion and the 2024 Asian indoor champion, and the Japanese national record holder over 400 metres indoors.

== Biography ==
She was a bronze medalist in the medley relay at the 2013 IAAF World Youth Championships in Donetsk, Ukraine. She was a silver medalist in Incheon, South Korea at the 2014 Asian Games in the women's 4 x 400 metres relay.

She was a bronze medalist in the mixed 4 x 400 metres relay at the 2023 Asian Athletics Championships in Bangkok, as part of the Japanese team which set a new national record in the event. She placed fourth in the women's 400 metres at the Championships.

She won the gold medal in the 400 metres at the 2024 Asian Indoor Athletics Championships in Tehran, Iran, in 55.14 seconds. She ran a new Japanese national indoor record for the 400 metres of 53.15 seconds competing in Kazakhstan on 1 March 2025.

She won the gold medal in the 400 metres at the 2025 Asian Athletics Championships in Gumi, South Korea, running 52.17 seconds. She was selected for the Japanese national team to compete at the 2025 World Athletics Championships, held in Tokyo. She ran on the opening day in the mixed 4 × 400 metres relay. She also ran in the women's 400 metres at the championships.

In May 2026, she ran at the 2026 World Athletics Relays in the mixed 4 × 400 metres relay in Gaborone, Botswana.
