= Athletics Federation of Nigeria =

Governing body of athletics in Nigeria

The Athletics Federation of Nigeria is the governing body for the sport of athletics in Nigeria. It is a member of the Confederation of African Athletics and the International Association of Athletics Federations.

It was founded as the Central Committee of the Amateur Athletic Association of Nigeria in 1944. AFN organizes the annual AFN Golden League competition which is a domestic competition with a similar format to the now defunct IAAF Golden League. In 2017, Ibrahim Shehu Gusau was elected the president of the body. As at July 2024, Tonobok Okowa is the AFN's president.

The AFN is headquartered at the Nigeria National Stadium in Garki, Abuja.
