= Kemi Adekoya =

Nigerian-Bahraini hurdler and sprinter (born 1993)

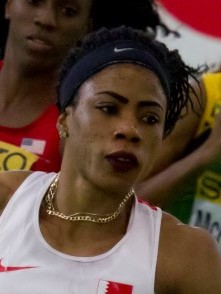

Personal information
- Born: January 16, 1993 (age 33)
- Height: 166 cm (5 ft 5 in)

Sport
- Country: Bahrain
- Sport: Track and field
- Event: 400 m hurdles

Achievements and titles
- Personal bests: 53.09 Budapest, 2023 AR
Medal record
Women's athletics
Representing Bahrain
World Indoor Championships
Gold medal – first place	2016 Portland	400 m
Asian Games
Gold medal – first place	2014 Incheon	400 m
Gold medal – first place	2014 Incheon	400 m hurdles
Gold medal – first place	2022 Hangzhou	400 m
Gold medal – first place	2022 Hangzhou	400 m hurdles
Gold medal – first place	2022 Hangzhou	4 × 400 m relay
Gold medal – first place	2022 Hangzhou	4 × 400 m mixed
Asian Championships
Gold medal – first place	2015 Wuhan	400 m hurdles
Asian Indoor Championships
Gold medal – first place	2016 Doha	400 m
Gold medal – first place	2016 Doha	4 × 400 m relay
Islamic Solidarity Games
Gold medal – first place	2025 Riyadh	400 m hurdles
Military World Games
Gold medal – first place	2015 Mungyeong	400 m hurdles
Bronze medal – third place	2015 Mungyeong	4 × 400 m

Oluwakemi "Kemi" Adekoya (born 16 January 1993 in Lagos) is a Nigerian-born track and field athlete who competes for Bahrain. She specialises in the 400 metres hurdles and has a personal best of 53.09 seconds – a Bahraini and Asian record.

In January 2019, it was reported that Adekoya tested positive for an illegal steroid stanozolol in an out-of-competition test in November 2018 and was provisionally suspended. All of her results achieved after 24 August 2018 were also stripped.

== Biography ==
Adekoya established herself as a hurdler at national level in Nigeria in 2011, placing fifth at the Nigerian championships. In 2012, she improved her best to 57.16 seconds to place second at the Confederation of African Athletics meet in Warri. That year she was runner-up at the Nigerian Olympic trials, but did not have the sufficient qualifying standard. She was selected for the 2012 World Junior Championships in Athletics but did not compete. In 2013, Adekoya set a new personal best of 55.30 seconds, finishing runner-up to Muizat Ajoke Odumosu, Nigeria's leading hurdler, and also set a flat 400 metres best of 52.57 seconds. Her hurdles best ranked her within the top thirty fastest athletes in the world that year.

Adekoya's first race of 2014 marked a significant change for her career. Making her debut on the Diamond League circuit, she defeated the entire elite 400 m hurdles field in a surprise win. Her time of 54.59 seconds was a world-leading one, and also a Bahraini national record. She had switched nationality to the oil-rich state at the start of the year and displayed a banner saying "I ♥ Bahrain" after her victory. This move was unknown to Solomon Ogba, the head of Athletics Federation of Nigeria, who was present at the race in Doha and lodged a complaint with the International Association of Athletics Federations, claiming her move as out-of-process. However, as Adekoya had never formally registered with the national federation, the country could not block the move. Nigerian officials and media noted the case as an example of African nations losing their top home-grown athletes to richer non-African nations (Nigerian sprinters Samuel Francis and Femi Ogunode both moved to Qatar).

In her second Diamond League race she was a close second to Kaliese Spencer at the Bislett Games, then took third place at the Golden Spike Ostrava meeting.

On Saturday, 13 August 2016 on Day 9 of the Rio 2016 Olympic Games in Brazil, Kemi ran an all time personal best of 50.72 to come out second behind America's Phyllis Francis who ran at 50.58 seconds there by qualifying for the semi-final 3.

In January 2019, it was reported that Adekoya tested positive for an illegal steroid stanozolol in an out-of-competition test in November 2018 and was provisionally suspended. All of her results achieved after 24 August 2018 were also stripped, including the two gold medals in the 400 hurdles and the 4 × 400 mixed relay at the 2018 Asian Games.

== Personal bests ==
- 400 metres hurdles – 53.09 seconds (2023) AR
- 400 metres – 50.53 seconds (2023)
