= 2023 Asian Athletics Championships =

2023 Asian Championships
- Dates: 12–16 July
- Host city: Bangkok, Thailand
- Venue: National Stadium
- Events: 45
- Participation: 625 athletes from 40 nations

The 2023 Asian Athletics Championships was the 25th edition of the Asian Athletics Championships. It was held from 12 to 16 July 2023 in Bangkok, Thailand. It was the first time that Thailand hosted this event since 1973. Held at the Supachalasai National Stadium in Bangkok, it also served as a qualification stage for athletes to participate at the 2023 World Athletics Championships in Budapest, Hungary.

== Venue ==
The 25th edition of the Asian Athletics Championships was held at Supachalasai National Stadium, Bangkok, Thailand.

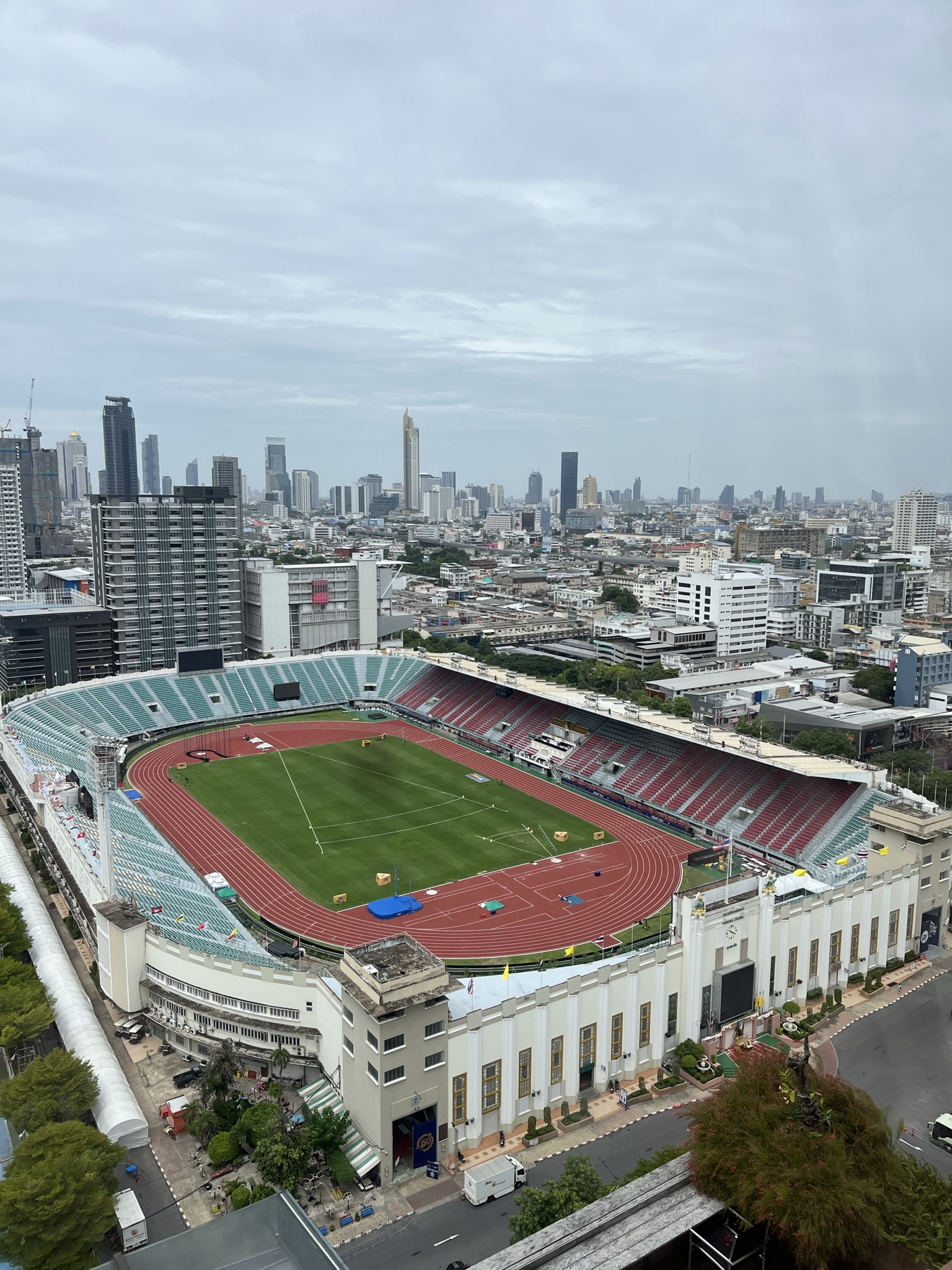
Supachalasai National Stadium in Bangkok during the 2023 Asian Athletics Championships.

== Medal table ==
* Host nation (Thailand)

| Rank | teams | Gold | Silver | Bronze | Total |
|---|---|---|---|---|---|
| 1 | Japan | 16 | 11 | 10 | 37 |
| 2 | China | 8 | 8 | 6 | 22 |
| 3 | India | 6 | 12 | 9 | 27 |
| 4 | Sri Lanka | 3 | 2 | 3 | 8 |
| 5 | Qatar | 2 | 1 | 1 | 4 |
| 6 | Philippines | 2 | 0 | 0 | 2 |
| 6 | Singapore | 2 | 0 | 0 | 2 |
| 8 | Kazakhstan | 1 | 2 | 1 | 4 |
| 8 | Uzbekistan | 1 | 2 | 1 | 4 |
| 10 | Thailand* | 1 | 1 | 4 | 6 |
| 11 | Chinese Taipei | 1 | 1 | 0 | 2 |
| 12 | South Korea | 1 | 0 | 2 | 3 |
| 13 | Vietnam | 1 | 0 | 1 | 2 |
| 14 | Iran | 0 | 2 | 1 | 3 |
| 14 | Saudi Arabia | 0 | 2 | 1 | 3 |
| 16 | Kuwait | 0 | 1 | 2 | 3 |
| 17 | Malaysia | 0 | 0 | 1 | 1 |
| 17 | Mongolia | 0 | 0 | 1 | 1 |
| 17 | Pakistan | 0 | 0 | 1 | 1 |
| Totals (19 entries) | | 45 | 45 | 45 | 135 |

== Medalists ==
=== Men ===
| Event | Gold | | Silver | | Bronze | |
|---|---|---|---|---|---|---|
| 100 metres | Hiroki Yanagita; Japan | 10.02 | Abdullah Abkar Mohammed; Saudi Arabia | 10.19 | Hassan Taftian; Iran | 10.23 |
| 200 metres | Towa Uzawa; Japan | 20.23 CR | Yang Chun-Han; Chinese Taipei | 20.48 | Koki Ueyama; Japan | 20.53 |
| 400 metres | Kentaro Sato; Japan | 45.00 | Fuga Sato; Japan | 45.13 | Yousef Ahmed Masrahi; Saudi Arabia | 45.19 |
| 800 metres | Abubaker Haydar Abdalla; Qatar | 1:45.33 | Krishan Kumar; India | 1:45.88 | Ebrahim Alzofairi; Kuwait | 1:46.11 |
| 1500 metres | Ajay Kumar Saroj; India | 3:41.51 | Yusuke Takahashi; Japan | 3:42.04 | Liu Dezhu; China | 3:42.30 |
| 5000 metres | Hyuga Endo; Japan | 13:34.94 | Kazuya Shiojiri; Japan | 13:43.92 | Gulveer Singh; India | 13:48.33 |
| 10,000 metres | Ren Tazawa; Japan | 29:18.44 | Shadrack Kimutai Koech; Kazakhstan | 29:31.63 | Abhishek Pal; India | 29:33.26 |
| 110 metres hurles | Shunya Takayama; Japan | 13.29 | Xu Zhuoyi; China | 13.39 | Yaqoub Alyouha; Kuwait | 13.56 |
| 400 metres hurdles | Bassem Hemeida; Qatar | 48.64 | Yusaku Kodama; Japan | 48.96 | Santhosh Kumar Tamilarasan; India | 49.09 |
| 3000 metres steeplechase | Ryoma Aoki; Japan | 8:34.91 | Yaser Salem Bagharab; Qatar | 8:37.11 | Seiya Sunada; Japan | 8:39.17 |
| 4×100 metres relay | Thailand; Natawat Iamudom; Soraoat Dapbang; Chayut Khongprasit; Puripol Boonson | 38.55 CR, NR | China; Wu Zhiqiang; Xie Zhenye; Chen Jiapeng; Chen Guanfeng | 38.87 | South Korea; Simon Lee; Ko Seung-hwan; Shin Min-kyu; Park Won-jin | 38.99 |
| 4×400 metres relay | Sri Lanka; Aruna Dharshana; Rajitha Niranjan; Pabasara Niku; Kalinga Kumarage; Pasindu Kodikara* | 3:01.56 CR, NR | India; Amoj Jacob; Muhammed Variyathodi; Mijo Kurian; Rajesh Ramesh; Rahul Kadam*; Nihal William* | 3:01.80 | Qatar; Bassem Hemeida; Abubaker Abdalla; Ismail Abakar; Ashraf Osman; Abdirahman Hassan*; Doudai Oumar* | 3:04.26 SB |
| 20 km racewalk | Yutaro Murayama; Japan | 1:24:40 | Wang Kaihua; China | 1:25:29 | Vikash Singh; India | 1:29:32 |
| High jump | Woo Sanghyeok; South Korea | 2.28 m | Sarvesh Anil Kushare; India | 2.26 m | Tawan Kaeodam; Thailand | 2.26 m |
| Pole vault | Ernest John Obiena; Philippines | 5.91 m CR | Hussain Al-Hizam; Saudi Arabia | 5.56 m | Huang Bokai; China | 5.51 m |
| Long jump | Lin Yu-tang; Chinese Taipei | 8.40 m CR | Murali Sreeshankar; India | 8.37 m | Zhang Mingkun; China | 8.08 m |
| Triple jump | Abdulla Aboobacker; India | 16.92 m | Hikaru Ikehata; Japan | 16.73 m | Kim Jang-woo; South Korea | 16.59 m |
| Shot put | Tajinderpal Singh Toor; India | 20.23 m | Mehdi Saberi; Iran | 19.98 m | Ivan Ivanov; Kazakhstan | 19.87 m |
| Discus throw | Abuduaini Tuergong; China | 61.19 m | Eissa Zankawi; Kuwait | 60.23 m | Muhammad Irfan Bin Shamshuddin; Malaysia | 59.63 m |
| Hammer throw | Wang Qi; China | 72.13 m | Sukhrob Khodjaev; Uzbekistan | 71.83 m | Shota Fukuda; Japan | 71.80 m |
| Javelin throw | Genki Dean; Japan | 83.15 m | Manu Devarakeshavi Prakasha; India | 81.01 m | Muhammad Yasir; Pakistan | 79.93 m |
| Decathlon | Yuma Maruyama; Japan | 7745 pts | Sutthisak Singkhon; Thailand | 7626 pts | Tejaswin Shankar; India | 7527 pts |

* Indicates the athletes only competed in the preliminary heats and received medals

=== Women ===
| Event | Gold | | Silver | | Bronze | |
|---|---|---|---|---|---|---|
| 100 metres | Shanti Pereira; Singapore | 11.20 NR | Farzaneh Fasihi; Iran | 11.39 | Ge Manqi; China | 11.40 |
| 200 metres | Shanti Pereira; Singapore | 22.70 CR | Jyothi Yarraji; India | 23.13 | Li Yuting; China | 23.25 |
| 400 metres | Nadeesha Ramanayaka; Sri Lanka | 52.61 PB | Aishwarya Kailash Mishra; India | 53.07 (Note: In April 2024, it was revealed that silver medallist Fairda Soliyeva of Uzbekistan, who originally clocked 52.95 seconds, failed a test for meldonium, disqualifying her from the competition and promoting the other competitors.) | Haruna Kuboyama; Japan | 53.80 |
| 800 metres | Tharushi Karunarathna; Sri Lanka | 2:00.66 CR, NR | K.M. Chanda; India | 2:01.58 | Gayanthika Artigala; Sri Lanka | 2:03.25 |
| 1500 metres | Nozomi Tanaka; Japan | 4:06.75 CR | Yume Goto; Japan | 4:13.25 | Gayanthika Artigala; Sri Lanka | 4:14.39 |
| 5000 metres | Yuma Yamamoto; Japan | 15:51.16 | Parul Chaudhary; India | 15:52.35 | Ankita; India | 16:03.33 |
| 10,000 metres | Haruka Kokai; Japan | 32:59.36 | Momoka Kawaguchi; Japan | 33:18.72 | Bayartsogt Munkhzaya; Mongolia | 33:24.79 NR |
| 100 metres hurdles | Jyothi Yarraji; India | 13.08 | Asuka Terada; Japan | 13.13 | Masumi Aoki; Japan | 13.26 |
| 400 metres hurdles | Robyn Lauren Brown; Philippines | 57.50 | Eri Utsunomiya; Japan | 57.73 | Ami Yamamoto; Japan | 57.80 |
| 3000 metres steeplechase | Parul Chaudhary; India | 9:38.76 | Xu Shuangshuang; China | 9:44.54 | Reimi Yoshimura; Japan | 9:48.48 |
| 4×100 metres relay | China; Liang Xiaojing; Wei Yongli; Yuan Qiqi; Ge Manqi | 43.35 | Japan; Miu Kurashige; Arisa Kimishima; Remi Tsuruta; Midori Mikase | 43.95 | Thailand; Supawan Thipat; Supanich Poolkerd; On-Uma Chattha; Athicha Phetkun | 44.56 |
| 4×400 metres relay | Vietnam; Nguyễn Thị Ngọc; Hoàng Thị Minh Hạnh; Nguyễn Thị Huyền; Nguyễn Thị Hằng | 3:32.36 | Sri Lanka; Nadeesha Ramanayaka; Lakshima Mendis; Nishendra Harshani Fernando; Tharushi Dissanayaka | 3:33.27 NR | India; Rezoana Mallick Heena; Aishwarya Kailash Mishra; Jyothika Sri Dandi; Subha Venkatesan | 3:33.73 |
| 20 km racewalk | Yang Liujing; China | 1:32:37 | Priyanka Goswami; India | 1:34:24 | Yukiko Umeno; Japan | 1:36:17 |
| High jump | Kristina Ovchinnikova; Kazakhstan | 1.86 m | Yelizaveta Matveyeva; Kazakhstan | 1.86 m | Svetlana Radzivil; Uzbekistan | 1.83 m |
| Pole vault | Li Ling; China | 4.66 m =CR | Niu Chunge; China | 4.51 m | Chayanisa Chomchuendee; Thailand | 4.10 m |
| Long jump | Sumire Hata; Japan | 6.97 m CR, NR | Shaili Singh; India | 6.54 m | Zhong Jiawei; China | 6.46 m |
| Triple jump | Mariko Morimoto; Japan | 14.06 m | Zeng Rui; China | 14.01 m | Nguyễn Thị Hường; Vietnam | 13.68 m |
| Shot put | Song Jiayuan; China | 18.88 m | Abha Khatua; India | 18.06 m | Manpreet Kaur; India | 17.00 m |
| Discus throw | Feng Bin; China | 66.42 m CR | Wang Fang; China | 58.49 m | Subenrat Insaeng; Thailand | 55.80 m |
| Hammer throw | Zhao Jie; China | 69.39 m | Joy McArthur; Japan | 66.56 m | Raika Murakami; Japan | 64.17 m |
| Javelin throw | Marina Saito; Japan | 61.67 m | Liu Shiying; China | 61.51 m | Dilhani Lekamge; Sri Lanka | 60.93 m NR |
| Heptathlon | Ekaterina Voronina; Uzbekistan | 6098 | Swapna Barman; India | 5840 | Yuki Yamasaki; Japan | 5696 |

=== Mixed ===
| Event | Gold | | Silver | | Bronze | |
|---|---|---|---|---|---|---|
| 4×400 metres relay | India; Rajesh Ramesh; Aishwarya Kailash Mishra; Amoj Jacob; Subha Venkatesan | 3:14.70 CR, NR | Sri Lanka; Aruna Dharshana; Tharushi Dissanayaka; Kalinga Kumarage; Nadeesha Ramanayaka | 3:15.41 NR | Japan; Kenki Imaizumi; Haruna Kuboyama; Fuga Sato; Nanako Matsumoto | 3:15.71 |

== Participating nations ==
A total of 42 countries participated.

- India (51)
- Afghanistan (2)
- Bangladesh (5)
- Bhutan (1)
- Cambodia (3)
- China (45)
- Chinese Taipei (30)
- Hong Kong (33)
- Indonesia (16)
- Iran (10)
- Iraq (6)
- Japan (74)
- Jordan (5)
- Kazakhstan (30)
- Kuwait (4)
- Kyrgyzstan (4)
- Laos (6)
- Lebanon (4)
- Macau (5)
- Malaysia (27)
- Maldives (13)
- Mongolia (4)
- Myanmar (2)
- Nepal (8)
- Oman (13)
- Pakistan (3)
- Palestine (4)
- Philippines (21)
- Qatar (16)
- Saudi Arabia (15)
- Singapore (15)
- South Korea (19)
- Sri Lanka (13)
- Tajikistan (3)
- Thailand (62)
- Timor-Leste (2)
- Turkmenistan (5)
- Uzbekistan (25)
- Vietnam (19)
- Yemen (2)

== See also ==
- 2023 World Athletics Championships
- 2023 Asian Indoor Athletics Championships
- 2023 Asian Cross Country Championships
