= Nadeesha Ramanayake =

Sri Lankan track and field athlete

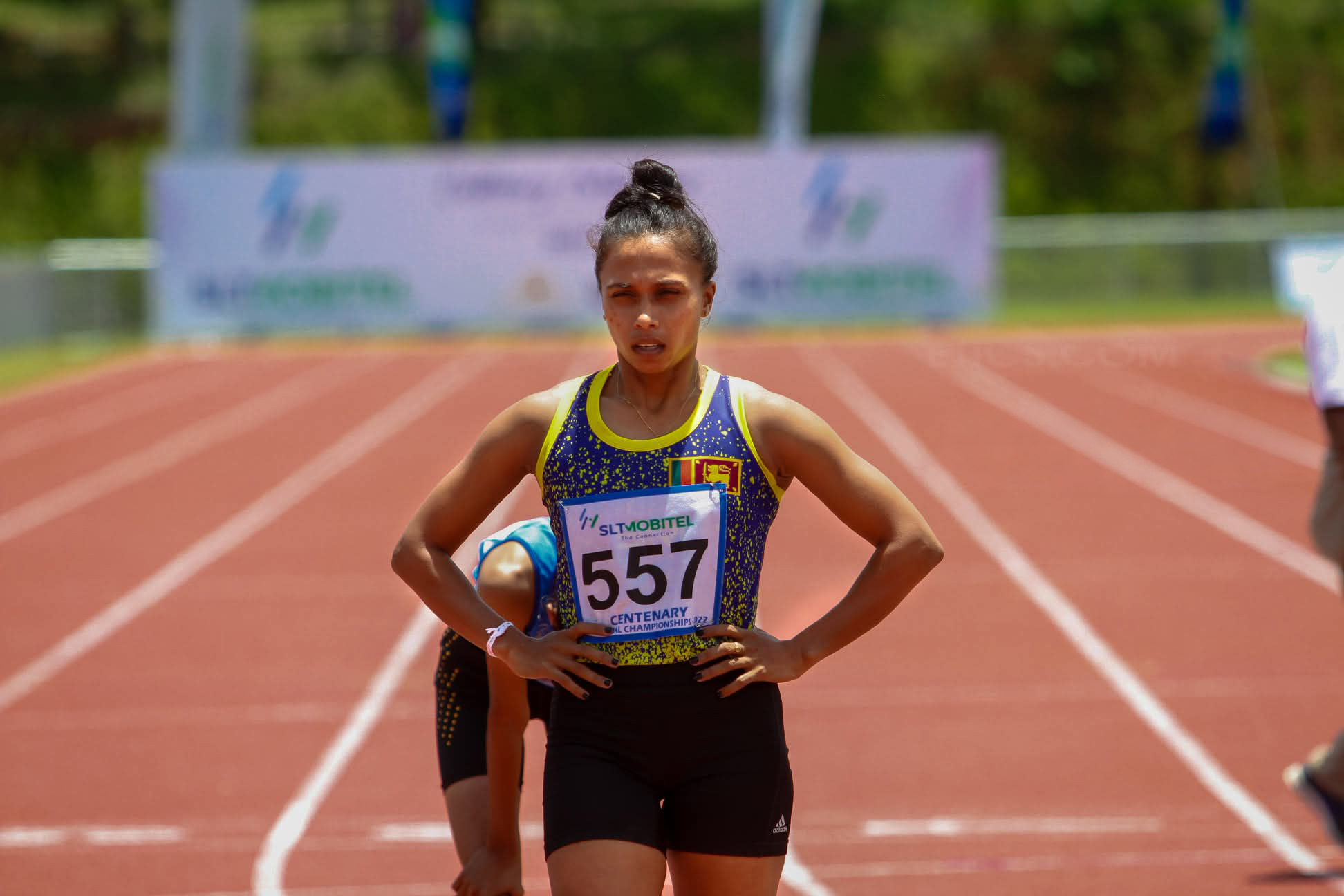
- Ramanayaka in 2025

Personal information
- Born: 25 December 1994 (age 31) Sri Lanka
- Military career
- Branch: Sri Lanka Army
- Rank: Staff Sergeant
- Unit: Women's Corps

Sport
- Sport: Track and field
- Event: 400 m

Achievements and titles
- Personal best: 52.61 (2023)
Medal record
Women's athletics
Representing Sri Lanka
Asian Games
Bronze medal – third place	2022 Hangzhou	4×400m
Asian Championships
Gold medal – first place	2023 Bangkok	400m
Silver medal – second place	2023 Bangkok	4×400m mixed
Silver medal – second place	2023 Bangkok	4×400m
Bronze medal – third place	2025 Gumi	4×400m
South Asian Championships
Silver medal – second place	2025 Ranchi	4x400m mixed
Silver medal – second place	2025 Ranchi	4x400m

Nadeesha Ramanayake (born 25 December 1994) is a Sri Lankan track and field athlete who competes mainly in the 400 m events. She won gold medal at the 2023 Asian Athletics Championships held in Bangkok in the women's 400 m event. She is a member of the Sri Lanka Army Women's Corps, serving as a Staff Sergeant.

== Career ==
In the 2011 Junior National Championships, Ramanayake made her debut at national level by representing Rajapaksa Central and finished sixth in the Under 18 girls’ 3,000 metres. Later, she started running the 800 metres and won a medal at the South Asian Junior Athletics Championships. For many years, she was second-fiddle to both her seniors and contemporaries before cementing her position in the 400 metre sprint event. At the 2019 Asian Athletics Championships, Ramanayake competed in the women's 4x400-meter race that broke the national record. She qualified for the 2023 Asian Championship and surpassed Menaka Wickramasinghe to become the third fastest woman in Sri Lankan history in the 400m. At the 400 meter event, she finished the race with a timing of 52.61 seconds and won gold in Thailand at the Asian Athletics Championships 2023. Ramanayake also became the eighth Sri Lankan to win an Asian Championships individual gold medal. She was also a member of the 4x400m women's relay silver medal-winning team and a prominent member of the 4x400m mixed relay silver medal-winning team at the same championship.

At the 47th Sri Lankan National Sports Games held in August 2023, she won gold for both 200m and 400m and also bagged the best women athlete award.

== Career highlights ==
Nadeesha Ramanayaka began her international career in middle-distance running, winning a silver medal in the 800 metres at the 2013 South Asian Junior Athletics Championship in Ranchi, India. She later transitioned to the 400 metres, where she achieved greater success.

In 2017, Ramanayaka secured the gold medal in the 800 metres at the Brunei Open Athletics Championship. The following year, she switched her primary focus to the 400 metres and went on to win the gold medal at the Thailand Open Athletics Championship (2018).

Her international breakthrough came in 2019, when she earned silver and bronze medals in the Asian Grand Prix series. At the Asian Athletics Championships in Doha, she finished 6th in the 400 metres and contributed to Sri Lanka’s 4th-place finish in the 4×400 metres relay, setting a new national record. Later that year, she also competed at the 7th CISM Military World Games in Wuhan, China, placing 7th in the 400 metres.

Ramanayaka’s career peaked in 2023, when she won the gold medal in the 400 metres at the Asian Athletics Championships in Bangkok. At the same championships, she also helped secure silver medals in both the women’s 4×400 metres relay and the mixed 4×400 metres relay, with both teams setting national records. Later that year, at the 2022 Asian Games held in Hangzhou, China, she was part of the Sri Lankan team that won the bronze medal in the 4×400 metres relay (national record). She also placed 5th in the individual 400 metres and initially finished 2nd in the 4×400 metres mixed relay before the team was disqualified.

In 2024, Ramanayaka continued her strong performances, winning the silver medal in the 400 metres at the UAE Athletics Grand Prix and another silver medal in the 4×400 metres mixed relay at the Asian Relay Championships in Bangkok. She also recorded consistent top-five finishes in the 400 metres at international meets in Taipei and Osaka.

Her consistency at the elite level continued in 2025, when she won a bronze medal in the 4×400 metres relay at the Asian Athletics Championships in Gumi, South Korea. She also represented Sri Lanka at the World Athletics Relays in Guangzhou, competing in both the women’s and mixed 4×400 metres relays, and at the World Athletics Indoor Championships in Nanjing, where the team placed 5th in the 4×400 metres relay.

Nadeesha Ramanayaka has also qualified to take part in the Tokyo World Athletics Championships 2025, scheduled to be held in Tokyo, Japan, from 13 to 20 September 2025.

== International honors ==
Year	Competition	Venue	Event	Result
2025	Asian Athletics Championships	Gumi Civic Stadium, Gumi	4×400 m relay	Bronze
2025	Asian Athletics Championships	Gumi Civic Stadium, Gumi	400 m	7th
2025	World Athletics Relays	Tianhe Sports Center, Guangzhou	4×400 m relay	7th
2025	World Athletics Relays	Tianhe Sports Center, Guangzhou	4×400 m mixed relay	DNF
2025	World Athletics Indoor Championships	Sports Training Center, Nanjing (i)	4×400 m relay	5th
2024	Taiwan Athletics Open	Taipei Municipal Stadium, Taipei City	400 m	4th
2024	Asian Relay Championships	Bangkok, Thailand	4×400 m relay	4th
2024	Asian Relay Championships	Bangkok, Thailand	4×400 m mixed relay	Silver
2024	Kinami Michitaka Memorial Athletics Meet	Yanmar Stadium Nagai, Osaka	400 m	4th
2024	UAE Athletics Grand Prix	United Arab Emirates	400 m	Silver
2023	Asian Games (2022 edition)	Hangzhou, China	4×400 m relay	Bronze (NR)
2023	Asian Games (2022 edition)	Hangzhou, China	400 m	5th (heats: 52.67s)
2023	Asian Games (2022 edition)	Hangzhou, China	4×400 m mixed relay	DQ (2nd before DQ)
2023	Asian Athletics Championships	Bangkok, Thailand	400 m	Gold
2023	Asian Athletics Championships	Bangkok, Thailand	4×400 m relay	Silver (NR)
2023	Asian Athletics Championships	Bangkok, Thailand	4×400 m mixed relay	Silver (NR)
2019	Asian Grand Prix 1	China	400 m	Silver
2019	Asian Grand Prix 2	China	400 m	Bronze
2019	Asian Athletics Championships	Doha, Qatar	400 m	6th
2019	Asian Athletics Championships	Doha, Qatar	4×400 m relay	4th (NR)
2019	CISM Military World Games	Wuhan, China	400 m	7th
2018	Thailand Open Athletics Championship	Thailand	400 m	Gold
2017	Brunei Open Athletics Championship	Brunei	800 m	Gold
2013	South Asian Junior Athletics Championship	Ranchi, India	800 m	Silver

National Honors

== National titles and honors ==
Year	Competition	Event	Result
2025	National Sports Festival	400 m	Silver
2025	National Athletics Championships	400 m	Gold
2024	National Sports Festival	400 m	Silver
2024	National Athletics Championships	400 m	Gold
2023	National Sports Festival	400 m	Gold
2023	National Sports Festival	200 m	Gold
2023	National Sports Festival	4×400 m relay	Gold
2021	National Athletics Championships	400 m	Gold
2020	National Athletics Championships	400 m	Gold
2019	National Athletics Championships	400 m	Gold
2018	National Athletics Championships	400 m	Gold
2018	National Athletics Championships	200 m	Silver
2018	National Sports Festival	400 m	Gold
2017	National Athletics Championships	400 m	Silver
2017	National Athletics Championships	800 m	Bronze
2017	National Sports Festival	400 m	Gold
