= 2025 Asian Athletics Championships – Men's 800 metres =

Men's 800 metres at the 2025 Asian Athletics Championships
- Venue: Gumi Civic Stadium
- Location: Gumi, South Korea
- Dates: 30 May (heats); 31 May (final)
- Competitors: 29 from 20 nations
- Winning time: 1:44.59

Medalists
gold medal	Ebrahim Al-Zofairi	Kuwait
silver medal	Ali Amirian	Iran
bronze medal	Abubaker Haydar Abdalla	Qatar

The men's 800 metres event at the 2025 Asian Athletics Championships was held on 30 and 31 May.

== Records ==
Records before the 2025 Asian Athletics Championships
Record	Athlete (nation)	Time (s)	Location	Date
World record	David Rudisha (KEN)	1:40.91	London, United Kingdom	9 August 2012
Asian record	Yusuf Saad Kamel (BHR)	1:42.79	Fontvieille, Monaco	29 July 2008
Championship record	Majed Saeed Sultan (QAT)	1:44.27	Incheon, South Korea	4 September 2005
World leading	Tshepiso Masalela (BOT)	1:42.70	Rabat, Morocco	25 May 2025
Asian leading	Ibrahim Chuot (QAT)	1:44.08	Doha, Qatar	16 May 2025

== Schedule ==
The event schedule, in local time (UTC+9), was as follows:

Date	Time	Round
30 May	18:00	Heats
31 May	19:15	Final

== Results ==
=== Heats ===
Held on 30 May. First 2 in each heat (Q) and the next 2 fastest (q) qualified for the semi-finals.

==== Heat 1 ====
Place	Athlete	Nation	Time	Notes
1	Kō Ochiai	Japan	1:46.24	Q, SB
2	Ali Amirian	Iran	1:46.34	Q, PB
3	Abubaker Haydar Abdalla	Qatar	1:46.73	q
4	Xi Xiaoheng	China	1:47.22	q, PB
5	Hussein Loraña	Philippines	1:47.88	PB
6	Sam Van Doi	Vietnam	1:49.55	PB
7	Hein Htet Aung	Myanmar	1:49.58	PB
8	Kim Hong-yu	South Korea	1:49.75	PB
9	Mohammad Kamran	Hong Kong	1:50.12	NR

==== Heat 2 ====
Place	Athlete	Nation	Time	Notes
1	Ebrahim Al-Zofairi	Kuwait	1:48.15	Q
2	Krishan Kumar	India	1:48.66	Q
3	Liu Dezhu	China	1:49.12	SB
4	Noureddine Adel Merzah	Iraq	1:49.39	SB
5	Kang Dong-hyung	South Korea	1:50.44	SB
6	Mohammed Al-Suleimani	Oman	1:50.90	SB
7	Joshua Atkinson	Thailand	1:50.91	SB
8	Sami Hattab	Jordan	1:51.80	PB
9	Ibrahim Al-Hakami	Saudi Arabia	1:53.16	PB
10	Mohammed Dwedar	Palestine	1:53.21	SB

==== Heat 3 ====
Place	Athlete	Nation	Time	Notes
1	Anu Kumar	India	1:47.00	Q
2	Yukichi Ishii	Japan	1:47.03	Q
3	Lee Jae-ung	South Korea	1:47.40	PB
4	Wan Muhammad Fazri	Malaysia	1:47.64	PB
5	Thiruben Thana Rajan	Singapore	1:49.94	NR
6	Bader Al-Sweed	Kuwait	1:49.97	SB
7	Lương Đức Phước	Vietnam	1:50.90	PB
8	Wahyudi Putra	Indonesia	1:50.93	PB
9	Faisal Maghrabi	Saudi Arabia	1:53.08	
—	Ibrahim Abass Chuot	Qatar	DQ	TR 17.2.3

=== Final ===
Place	Athlete	Nation	Time	Notes
1st place, gold medalist(s)	Ebrahim Al-Zofairi	Kuwait	1:44.59	PB
2nd place, silver medalist(s)	Ali Amirian	Iran	1:44.97	PB
3rd place, bronze medalist(s)	Abubaker Haydar Abdalla	Qatar	1:45.20	
4	Yukichi Ishii	Japan	1:46.74	
5	Ko Ochiai	Japan	1:48.01	
6	Xi Xiaoheng	China	1:48.45	
7	Krishan Kumar	India	1:48.72	
8	Anu Kumar	India	1:58.04	
