= Feng Zhiqiang =

Chinese sprinter

Personal information
- Native name: 冯志强
- Nationality: China
- Born: 14 April 1998 (age 28) Cangqian, Yuhang, Hangzhou, Zhejiang, China
- Home town: Zhejiang, China
- Height: 188 cm (6 ft 2 in)

Sport
- Sport: Athletics
- Events: 400 metres hurdles, 400 metres

Achievements and titles
- National finals: 2015 Chinese U18s; • 400 m hurdles, 3rd (bronze); 2016 Chinese U20s; • 200 m, 1st (gold); 2017 Chinese Champs; • 400 m, 2nd (silver); 2017 Chinese U20s; • 100 m, 8th; • 400 m hurdles, 1st (gold); 2017 National Games; • 400 m hurdles, 1st (gold); • 4 × 400 m, 2nd (silver); 2020 Chinese Champs; • 400 m hurdles, 1st (gold)
- Personal bests: 400 mH: 49.64 (2023); 400 m: 46.59 (2017)
Medal record
Men's athletics
Representing China
Asian Junior Championships
Silver medal – second place	2016 Ho Chi Minh City	400 m hurdles

Feng Zhiqiang (Note: In this Chinese name, the family name is Feng.) (Chinese: 冯志强; born 14 April 1998) is a Chinese hurdler and sprinter. He was the winner of the 2017 Chinese National Games in the 400 metres hurdles.

== Biography ==
Zhiqiang was born in the Cangqian district of Yuhang, part of the Hangzhou city in the Zhejiang province of China.

At the 2016 Asian Junior Athletics Championships, Feng earned his first international medal by placing 2nd in the 400 m hurdles.

The following year, Feng won his first senior national title at the 2017 National Games. He was noted for being just a teenager despite beating multiple senior athletes.

In 2018, Feng was selected to represent China at the 2018 Asian Games in the 400 m hurdles, but he was the only athlete not to start the competition. In 2019, Feng was finally able to start the race at the Asian Athletics Championships, in both the 400 m hurdles where he was the fastest athlete to not qualify for the final, and in the mixed 4 × 400 m relay where his team finished 5th. At the 2019 IAAF World Relays, Feng competed in the mixed 4 × 400 m again, this time with a different team including Wu Yuang as the anchor. China finished 4th in the B final, and 8th overall.

At the 2020 Chinese Athletics Championships, Feng backed up his 2017 National Games win with his first Chinese Athletics Championships victory, finishing 1st in the 400 m hurdles.

== Statistics ==
=== Personal bests ===
Event	Mark	Place	Competition	Venue	Date
400 metres hurdles	49.64	1st place, gold medalist(s)	World Championships & Asian Games Trials	Shenyang, China	28 June 2023
400 metres	46.59	2nd place, silver medalist(s)	Chinese Athletics Championships	Jinan, China	17 May 2017
