= Athletics at the 2026 Asian Games – Men's 1500 metres =

Men's 1500 metres at the 2026 Asian Games
- Venue: Mizuho Park Athletic Stadium, Nagoya
- Date: 26–28 September 2026
- Competitors: 22 from 15 nations
- Winning time: 3:36.35

Medalists
gold medal	Kazuto Iizawa	Japan
silver medal	Gulveer Singh	India
bronze medal	Nagiya Mori	Japan

The men's 1,500 metres competition at the 2026 Asian Games took place from 26 to 28 September 2026 at the Mizuho Park Athletic Stadium in Nagoya, Japan.

== Schedule ==
All times are Japan Standard Time (UTC+09:00)

Schedule
Date	Time	Event
26 September 2026	20:51	Round 1
28 September 2026	20:08	Final

== Records ==
Prior to this competition, the existing world, Asian and Games records were as follows.

World Record	Hicham El Guerrouj (MAR)	3:26.00	Rome, Italy	13 July 1998
Asian Record	Rashid Ramzi (BHR)	3:29.14	Rome, Italy	13 July 2006
Games Record	Mohammed Shaween (KSA)	3:36.49	Guangzhou, China	22 November 2010

== Results ==
=== Round 1 ===
First six in each heat (Q) advanced to the final.

==== Heat 1 ====
Place	Athlete	Nation	Time	Notes
1	Kazuto Iizawa	Japan	3:45.22	Q
2	Xi Xiaoheng	China	3:45.74	Q
3	Yoonus Shah	India	3:45.77	q
4	Mohamed Torech	Qatar	3:45.83	Q
5	Bader Alsweed	Kuwait	3:45.89	Q, PB
6	Park Jong-hak	South Korea	3:46.28	Q
7	Zouhair Aouad	Bahrain	3:47.28	SB
8	Abdullah Al Haswali	Yemen	3:48.91	
9	Mukesh Pal	Nepal	3:49.57	PB
10	Hossein Nouri	Iran	3:50.13	
11	Baasandash Tumennasan	Mongolia	3:56.18	

==== Heat 2 ====
Place	Athlete	Nation	Time	Notes
1	Ibrahim Chuot	Qatar	3:45.54	Q
2	Nagiya Mori	Japan	3:45.66	Q
3	Gulveer Singh	India	3:45.79	Q
4	Chien Tzu-chieh	Chinese Taipei	3:45.82	Q
5	Liu Dezhu	China	3:46.11	Q
6	Lee Jae-ung	South Korea	3:46.44	Q
7	Nursultan Keneshbekov	Kyrgyzstan	3:46.45	
8	Davaanyam Myagmarsuren	Mongolia	3:49.67	PB
9	Abdisamad Hirsi	Bahrain	3:50.36	
10	Wahyudi Putra	Indonesia	3:57.95	
11	Yahya Mashqai	Palestine	4:08.59	

=== Final ===
Place	Athlete	Nation	Time	Notes
1st place, gold medalist(s)	Kazuto Iizawa	Japan	3:36.35	GR
2nd place, silver medalist(s)	Gulveer Singh	India	3:36.72	SB
3rd place, bronze medalist(s)	Nagiya Mori	Japan	3:37.92	
4	Liu Dezhu	China	3:38.03	
5	Ibrahim Chuot	Qatar	3:38.60	
6	Chien Tzu-chieh	Chinese Taipei	3:39.00	PB
7	Lee Jae-ung	South Korea	3:40.11	
8	Mohamed Torech	Qatar	3:40.19	
9	Yoonus Shah	India	3:43.88	
10	Park Jong-hak	South Korea	3:46.87	
11	Bader Alsweed	Kuwait	3:48.92	
12	Xi Xiaoheng	China	4:50.83	
