= Athletics at the 2026 Asian Games – Men's 800 metres =

Men's 800 metres at the 2026 Asian Games
- Venue: Mizuho Park Athletic Stadium, Nagoya
- Dates: 27 September 2026 (round 1); 29 September 2026 (final)
- Competitors: 21 from 17 nations
- Winning time: 1:44.48 s GR

Medalists
gold medal	Ko Ochiai	Japan
silver medal	Ali Amirian	Iran
bronze medal	Abubaker Haydar Abdalla	Qatar

The men's 800 metres competition at the 2026 Asian Games took place from 27 to 29 September 2026 at the Mizuho Park Athletic Stadium in Nagoya, Japan.

== Schedule ==
All times are Japan Standard Time (UTC+09:00)

Schedule
Date	Time	Event
27 September 2026	17:06	Round 1
29 September 2026	16:35	Final

== Records ==
Prior to this competition, the existing world, Asian and Games records were as follows.

World Record	David Rudisha (KEN)	1:40.91	London, United Kingdom	7 September 2012
Asian Record	Yusuf Saad Kamel (BHR)	1:42.79	Monaco, Monaco	28 July 2008
Games Record	Sajjad Moradi (IRI)	1:45.45	Guangzhou, China	24 November 2010

== Results ==
=== Round 1 ===
First two in each heat (Q) and next two fastest (q) advanced to the final.

==== Heat 1 ====
Place	Athlete	Nation	Time	Notes
1	Ko Ochiai	Japan	1:45.90	Q
2	Abubaker Abdalla	Qatar	1:46.53	Q
3	Ebrahim Al-Zofairi	Kuwait	1:47.62	q
4	Umar Osman	Malaysia	1:48.74	PB
5	Som Bahadur Kumal	Nepal	1:48.95	PB
6	Huang Jyun-siang	Chinese Taipei	1:53.29	
7	Manuel Ataide	Timor-Leste	1:55.67	

==== Heat 2 ====
Place	Athlete	Nation	Time	Notes
1	Ali Amirian	Iran	1:47.26	Q
2	Hatim Ait Oulghazi	Qatar	1:47.36	Q
3	Mohammed Afsal	India	1:47.37	q
4	Harsha Dissanayaka	Sri Lanka	1:49.99	
5	Mohammad Kamran Khan	Hong Kong	1:50.31	PB
6	Myagmarsuren Davaanyam	Mongolia	1:52.08	PB
—	Yahya Mashaqui	Palestine	DNS	

==== Heat 3 ====
Place	Athlete	Nation	Time	Notes
1	Xi Xiaoheng	China	1:49.82	Q
2	Nanaki Man No	Japan	1:49.91	Q
3	Krishan Kumar	India	1:50.38	
4	Hussein Loraña	Philippines	1:51.68	
5	Wan Muhammad Fazri	Malaysia	1:53.63	
6	Thiruben Thana Rajan	Singapore	1:55.76	
7	Baasandash Tumennasan	Mongolia	1:56.41	

=== Final ===
Place	Athlete	Nation	Time	Notes
1st place, gold medalist(s)	Ko Ochiai	Japan	1:44.48	GR
2nd place, silver medalist(s)	Ali Amirian	Iran	1:45.10	SB
3rd place, bronze medalist(s)	Abubaker Haydar Abdalla	Qatar	1:45.25	PB
4	Xi Xiaoheng	China	1:45.46	PB
5	Ebrahim Al-Zofairi	Kuwait	1:45.76	SB
6	Hatim Ait Oulghazi	Qatar	1:46.41	
7	Nanaki Man No	Japan	1:47.59	
8	Mohammed Afsal	India	1:48.27	
