= Wang Yang (high jumper) =

Chinese high jumper

Personal information
- Nationality: Chinese
- Born: 14 February 1989 (age 37)
- Home town: Liaoning
- Height: 185 cm (6 ft 1 in)
- Weight: 65 kg (143 lb)

Sport
- Sport: Athletics
- Event: High jump
- Coached by: Rolf Ohman
- Retired: 2019

Achievements and titles
- Personal bests: HJ: 1.92m (2012); HJ (indoor): 1.88m (2012)
Medal record
Women's athletics
Representing China
Asian Championships
Silver medal – second place	2015 Wuhan	High jump
Asian Indoor Championships
Silver medal – second place	2012 Hangzhou	High jump

Wang Yang (Chinese: 王洋, born 14 February 1989) is a Chinese former high jumper. She is a two-time national champion in the high jump and was a silver medalist at the Asian Championships in Athletics both indoors and outdoors.

== Biography ==
Yang competed in her first senior national championships in 2008, when she won a silver medal at the age of 19. However, she finished 5th in the separate Chinese Olympic Trials meeting that year, so she was not selected to represent China at the 2008 Summer Olympics. Yang finished 4th and 5th at the 2009 and 2010 Chinese Athletics Championships, so her next national medal did not come until 2011 and 2012 when she won two more silver medals.

In 2015, Yang won her first national championship title, jumping 1.88 metres to beat runner-up Zheng Xingjuan by 4 centimetres.

2017 was a particularly successful year for Yang. After winning her second Chinese Athletics Championships title on 19 May, she went on to win the more prestigious National Games gold medal, an event only held every four years.

Yang is from the province of Liaoning where she was coached by Rolf Ohman.

== Statistics ==
=== Personal bests ===
Event	Mark	Competition	Venue	Date
High jump	1.92 m	Chinese Athletics Championships	Kunshan, China	25 September 2012
High jump (indoors)	1.88 m	Asian Indoor Athletics Championships	Hangzhou, China	18 February 2012
