= 2025 Asian Athletics Championships – Men's 1500 metres =

Men's 1500 metres at the 2025 Asian Athletics Championships
- Venue: Gumi Civic Stadium
- Location: Gumi, South Korea
- Dates: 27 May (heats); 28 May (final)
- Competitors: 25 from 18 nations
- Winning time: 3:42.56

Medalists
gold medal	Kazuto Iizawa	Japan
silver medal	Lee Jae-ung	South Korea
bronze medal	Yoonus Shah	India

The men's 1500 metres event at the 2025 Asian Athletics Championships was held on 27 and 28 May.

== Records ==
Records before the 2025 Asian Athletics Championships
Record	Athlete (nation)	Time (s)	Location	Date
World record	Hicham El Guerrouj (MAR)	3:26.00	Rome, Italy	14 July 1998
Asian record	Rashid Ramzi (BHR)	3:29.14	Rome, Italy	14 July 2006
Championship record	Kim Soon-Hyung (KOR)	3:38.60	Manila, Philippines	3 December 1993
World leading	Jakob Ingebrigtsen (NOR)	3:29.63	Liévin, France	13 February 2025
Asian leading	Seyedamir Zamanpour (IRI)	3:36.92	Dubai, United Arab Emirates	9 May 2025

== Schedule ==
The event schedule, in local time (UTC+9), was as follows:

Date	Time	Round
27 May	09:20	Heats
28 May	18:00	Final

== Results ==
=== Heats ===
Held on 27 May. First 6 in each heat (Q) and the next 2 fastest (q) qualified for the final.

==== Heat 1 ====
Place	Athlete	Nation	Time	Notes
1	Nanami Arai	Japan	3:46.92	Q, PB
2	Yoonus Shah	India	3:46.96	Q
3	Seyed Amir Zamanpour	Iran	3:47.97	Q
4	Xi Xiaoheng	China	3:48.25	Q
5	Raed Al-Jadani	Saudi Arabia	3:48.75	Q
6	Abdirahman Saeed Hassan	Qatar	3:49.04	Q
7	Wahyudi Putra	Indonesia	3:49.73	PB
8	Mukesh Pal	Nepal	3:49.96	PB
9	Samat Kazakbayev	Kyrgyzstan	3:54.35	SB
10	Anas Ariffin	Malaysia	4:00.15	SB
11	Kim Tae-heon	South Korea	4:04.84	
12	Dechen Ugyen	Bhutan	4:21.88	SB
—	Myagmarsuren Davaanyam	Mongolia	DNS	

==== Heat 2 ====
Place	Athlete	Nation	Time	Notes
1	Lee Jae-ung	South Korea	3:50.33	Q
2	Kazuto Iizawa	Japan	3:50.35	Q, PB
3	Ali Amirian	Iran	3:51.73	Q
4	Sami Hattab	Jordan	3:51.84	Q
5	Liu Dezhu	China	3:51.87	Q
6	Hatim Ait Oulghazi	Qatar	3:51.95	Q
7	Maxim Frolowskij	Kazakhstan	3:52.09	
8	Lương Đức Phước	Vietnam	3:53.20	PB
9	Mohammed Al-Suleimani	Oman	3:54.61	PB
10	Sulaiman Zhusup	Kyrgyzstan	3:55.16	PB
11	Mohammad Kamran	Hong Kong	3:57.02	PB
12	Park Jong-hak	South Korea	4:04.36	
13	Kinley Lhendup	Bhutan	4:18.89	PB

=== Final ===
Place	Athlete	Nation	Time	Notes
1st place, gold medalist(s)	Kazuto Iizawa	Japan	3:42.56	PB
2nd place, silver medalist(s)	Lee Jae-ung	South Korea	3:42.79	
3rd place, bronze medalist(s)	Yoonus Shah	India	3:43.03	
4	Ali Amirian	Iran	3:43.18	PB
5	Nanami Arai	Japan	3:45.65	PB
6	Liu Dezhu	China	3:45.88	
7	Seyed Amir Zamanpour	Iran	3:45.93	
8	Xi Xiaoheng	China	3:47.42	SB
9	Raed Al-Jadani	Saudi Arabia	3:47.66	
10	Abdirahman Saeed Hassan	Qatar	3:47.69	SB
11	Sami Hattab	Jordan	3:51.29	
12	Hatim Ait Oulghazi	Qatar	3:51.90	SB
