= Athletics at the 2022 Asian Games – Men's 800 metres =

Athletics at the 2022 Asian Games

Men's 800 metres at the 2022 Asian Games
- Venue: Hangzhou Olympic Expo Main Stadium
- Date: 2–3 October 2023
- Competitors: 21 from 16 nations

Medalists
gold medal	Essa Kzwani	Saudi Arabia
silver medal	Mohammed Afsal	India
bronze medal	Husain Al-Farsi	Oman

The men's 800 metres competition at the 2022 Asian Games took place on 2 and 3 October 2023 at the HOC Stadium, Hangzhou.

== Schedule ==
All times are China Standard Time (UTC+08:00)

Date	Time	Event
Monday, 2 October 2023	09:40	Round 1
Tuesday, 3 October 2023	20:25	Final

== Records ==
Prior to this competition, the existing world, Asian and Games records were as follows.

World Record	David Rudisha (KEN)	1:40.91	London, United Kingdom	9 August 2012
Asian Record	Yusuf Saad Kamel (BRN)	1:42.79	Monaco	29 July 2008
Games Record	Sajjad Moradi (IRI)	1:45.45	Guangzhou, China	25 November 2010

== Results ==
Legend

- DNF — Did not finish
- DSQ — Disqualified

=== Round 1 ===
- Qualification: First 2 in each heat (Q) and the next 2 fastest (q) advance to the final.

==== Heat 1 ====
Rank	Athlete	Time	Notes
1	Essa Kzwani (KSA)	1:48.98	Q
2	Liu Dezhu (CHN)	1:49.32	Q
3	Abubaker Haydar Abdalla (QAT)	1:50.17	
4	Chhun Bunthorn (CAM)	1:50.97	
5	Musulman Dzholomanov (KGZ)	1:54.20	
6	Mohammed Dwedar (PLE)	1:55.31	
7	Hussain Fazeel Haroon (MDV)	1:57.20	

==== Heat 2 ====
Rank	Athlete	Time	Notes
1	Mohammed Afsal (IND)	1:46.79	Q
2	Ebrahim Al-Zofairi (KUW)	1:47.01	Q
3	Husain Al-Farsi (OMA)	1:47.68	q
4	Joshua Atkinson (THA)	1:48.18	q
5	Waqas Akbar (PAK)	1:52.99	
6	Hussain Riza (MDV)	1:54.58	
—	Sorn Pisey (CAM)	DNF	

==== Heat 3 ====
Rank	Athlete	Time	Notes
1	Abdirahman Saeed Hassan (QAT)	1:49.32	Q
2	Krishan Kumar (IND)	1:49.45	Q
3	Sami Al-Yami (KSA)	1:49.56	
4	Som Bahadur Kumal (NEP)	1:50.38	
5	Sho Kawamoto (JPN)	1:52.93	
6	Manuel Ataide (TLS)	1:58.62	
7	Naraugiin Jandos (MGL)	1:59.11	

=== Final ===
Rank	Athlete	Time	Notes
1st place, gold medalist(s)	Essa Kzwani (KSA)	1:48.05	
2nd place, silver medalist(s)	Mohammed Afsal (IND)	1:48.43	
3rd place, bronze medalist(s)	Husain Al-Farsi (OMA)	1:48.51	
4	Abdirahman Saeed Hassan (QAT)	1:48.56	
5	Liu Dezhu (CHN)	1:48.81	
6	Ebrahim Al-Zofairi (KUW)	1:49.05	
7	Joshua Atkinson (THA)	1:50.50	
—	Krishan Kumar (IND)	DSQ	
