= Athletics at the 2017 National Games of China =

Athletics at the 13th National Games of China
- Dates: 2–7 September
- Host city: Tianjin, PR China
- Venue: Tianjin Olympic Center Stadium
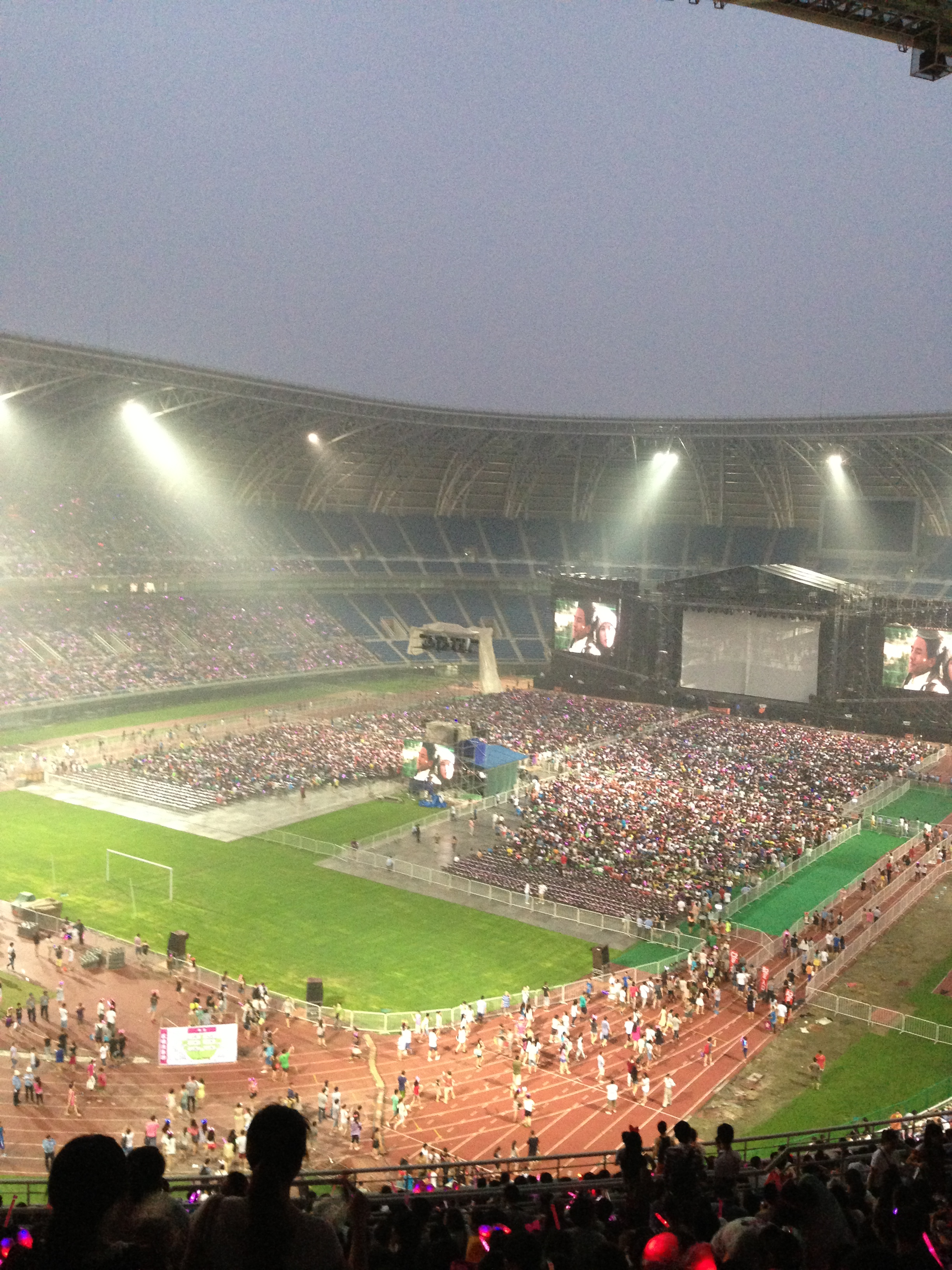
- Level: Senior
- Events: 46

At the 2017 National Games of China, the athletics events were held at the Tianjin Olympic Center Stadium in Tianjin, People's Republic of China from 2–7 September 2017. The marathon events were held in April, prior to the main track and field competitions. The marathon events were held on 29 April and started in a square in the Wuqing District of Tianjin and included a women's team marathon competition as well as amateur races. A total of 46 events were contested – 22 men's events, 23 women's events and one mixed-sex medley relay event over 1600m.

The winner of the women's marathon Wang Jiali was later subject to a doping failure and both her and her coach were banned for life as a result (her second such infraction).

== Medal summary ==
=== Men ===
Event	Gold		Silver		Bronze	
100 metres	Xie Zhenye; Zhejiang	10.04	Su Bingtian	10.10	Xu Haiyang	10.28
200 metres	Xie Zhenye; Zhejiang	20.20	Liang Jinsheng; Guangdong	20.74	Bie Ge; Chongqing	20.78
400 metres	Guo Zhongze	45.14 NR	Lu Zhiquan	46.08	Wu Yuang	46.27
1500 metres	Luo Yuxi	3:44.35	Ma Haifeng	3:44.45	Huang Peng	3:45.58
10,000 metres	Duo Bujie	28:26.86	Dong Guojian	28:51.57	Nima Mijue	29:26.46
110 m hurdles	Xie Wenjun	13.52	Jiang Fan	13.78	Zhong Honglin	13.78
400 m hurdles	Feng Zhiqiang	49.66	Shang Shuo	49.79	Wang Yang	50.00
4 × 100 m relay	Beijing-Zhejiang-Guangdong; Zhang Peimeng; Wu Zhiqiang; Xie Zhenye; Su Bingtian	38.16	Shanghai-Guangdong; Mo Youxue; Zhang Ruixuan; Lu Jiateng; Xu Zhouzheng	38.80	Hubei-Guangdong; Luo Wenyi; Xu Jun; Bie Ge; Zhao Xiandong	38.96
4 × 400 m relay	Tianjin-Jiangxi-Guangdong; Wu Yuang; Li Runyu; Lu Zhiquan; Guo Zhongze	3:05.28	Jiangsu-Zhejiang-Luchuan C Xu Jianan; Zhu Chenbin; Yang Lei; Feng Zhiqiang	3:05.63	Jiangsu-Zhejiang-Luchuan B Jin Yinpeng; Zhang Yaorong; Li Xiaolong; Huang Xin	3:06.30
20 km walk	Wang Kaihua	1:20:52	Bian Tongda	1:21:01	Chen Rui	1:21:59
20 km walk team	?		?		?	
50 km walk	Xu Faguang	3:54:02	Wang Qin	3:54:46	Luo Dongpo	3:54:47
Marathon	Dong Jianguo; Yunnan	2:18:45	Yang Dinghong; PLA	2:19:09	Muhan Hasi; Xinjiang	2:20:22
High jump	Wang Yu	2.27 m	Zhang Guowei	2.27 m	Wang Chen	2.27 m
Pole vault	Xue Changrui	5.60 m	Zhang Wei	5.50 m	Yao Jie	5.50 m
Long jump	Huang Changzhou	8.28 m	Gao Xinglong	8.12 m	Wang Jianan	8.12 m
Triple jump	Dong Bin	17.23 m	Zhu Yaming	17.23 m	Cao Shuo	17.22 m
Shot put	Tian Zhizhong	19.58 m	Wang Guangfu	19.29 m	Jie Feng	19.15 m
Discus throw	Wu Jian	59.62 m	Wei Zidong	56.73 m	Zhang Mengjie	56.29 m
Hammer throw	Wang Shizhu	76.12 m	Wan Yong	73.02 m	Qi Dakai	69.54 m
Javelin throw	Zhao Qinggang	80.04 m	Ma Qun	79.91 m	Liu Qizhen	79.67 m
Decathlon	Guo Qi	7666 pts	Hu Yufei	7538 pts	Gong Kewei	7428 pts

=== Women ===
Event	Gold		Silver		Bronze	
100 metres	Wei Yongli; Guangxi	11.31	Yuan Qiqi	11.41	Liang Xiaojing	11.58
200 metres	Huang Guifen	23.24	Yuan Qiqi	23.28	Ge Manqi	23.36
400 metres	Yang Huizhen	51.80	Cheng Chong	52.45	Tong Cenghuan	52.76
800 metres	Wang Chunyu	2:03.49	Zhao Jing	2:04.10	Hu Zhiying	2:04.34
1500 metres	Zhao Jing	4:16.41	Liu Fang	4:17.05	Xu Shuangshuang	4:17.67
5000 metres	Xu Qiuzi	15:46.42	Xu Shuangshuang	15:47.05	Cao Maojie	15:47.27
10,000 metres	Li Dan	34:00.25	Zhang Deshun	34:00.75	Wang Xueqin	34:00.78
100 m hurdles	Wu Shuijiao	12.97	Wang Dou	13.34	Wu Yanni	13.36
400 m hurdles	Wang Huan	55.99	Xiao Xia	56.02	Wu Xueting	56.98
4 × 100 m relay	Su Minxiang; Ge Manqi; Lin Huijun; Jiang Lan; Yuan Qiqi	42.59	Shanghai-Guangdong-Guangxi B Liang Xiaojing; Kong Lingwei; Tao Yujia; Wei Yongli	42.70	People's Liberation Army; Xie Zeru; Wang Xuan; Na Yang; Yang Hongguang	44.45
4 × 400 m relay	Sulu Xiangchuan C Huang Guifen; Cheng Chong; Pan Gaoqin; Yang Huizhen	3:30.95	Anhui-Guangdong; Chen Jingwen; Wang Chunyu; Liang Nuo; Fu Na	3:32.37	Sulu Xiangchuan B Huang Yan; Xiao Xia; Zhou Yu; Liao Mengxue	3:32.62
Marathon	Wang Jiali; Hebei	2:33:36	Cao Maojie; Qinghai	2:36:06	Hua Shaoqing; Hebei	2:36:38
Team marathon	Inner Mongolia; Gong Lihua (2:36:48); Zhang Yingying (2:37:46); He Yinli (2:40:11); Jin Mingming (2:41:42)	10:36:27	Jiangsu		Yunnan	
20 km walk	Yang Jiayu	1:28:29	Qieyang Shenjie	1:28:33	Li Leilei; Tianjin	1:34:37
20 km walk team	?		?		?	
High jump	Wang Yang	1.90 m	Zheng Xingjuan	1.90 m	Deng Siyi	1.84 m
Pole vault	Xu Huiqin	4.40 m	Li Ling	4.40 m	Ren Mengqian	4.40 m
Long jump	Lu Minjia	6.63 m	Xu Xiaoling	6.51 m	Zhou Xiaoxue	6.36 m
Triple jump	Wang Wupin	13.88 m	Li Yanmei	13.65 m	Chen Mudan	13.54 m
Shot put	Gong Lijiao	19.46 m	Guo Tianqian	18.20 m	Liu Xiangrong	18.12 m
Discus throw	Su Xinyue	64.56 m	Feng Bin	64.46 m	Chen Yang	62.64 m
Hammer throw	Zhang Wenxiu	75.48 m	Luo Na	72.27 m	Liu Tingting	71.68 m
Javelin throw	Li Lingwei	64.07 m	Lü Huihui	62.70 m	Zhang Li	61.32 m
Heptathlon	Wang Qingling	6033 pts	Shen Muhan	5621 pts	Du Jiani	5409 pts
