= 2015 Asian Athletics Championships – Women's 4 × 400 metres relay =

The women's 4 × 400 metres event at the 2015 Asian Athletics Championships was held on June 7.

== Results ==
Rank	Nation	Competitors	Time	Notes
1st place, gold medalist(s)	China	Huang Guifen, Cheng Chong, Chen Jingwen, Yang Huizhen	3:33.44	
2nd place, silver medalist(s)	India	Jisna Mathew, Tintu Luka, Majumder Debashree, M. R. Poovamma	3:33.81	
3rd place, bronze medalist(s)	Kazakhstan	Elina Mikhina, Yuliya Rakhmanova, Aleksandra Romanova, Anastassiya Kudinova	3:35.14	
4	Japan	Sayaka Fujisawa, Asami Chiba, Sayaka Aoki, Manami Kira	3:35.93	
5	Hong Kong	Lam Christy Ho Yan, Chua Yan Ching, Poon Hang Wai, Chan Sin Hung	3:56.40	
