= 2020 Chinese Athletics Championships =

- Dates: 15–18 September
- Host city: Shaoxing, China
- Venue: Shangyu Stadium

The 2020 Chinese Athletics Championships (Chinese: 全国田径锦标赛 2020) was the year's national outdoor track and field championships for China. It was held from 15 to 18 September in Shaoxing.

== Results ==
=== Men ===
Event	Gold		Silver		Bronze	
100 metres (Wind: -0.2 m/s)	Xie Zhenye	10.31	Zhang Ruixuan	10.34	Chen Guanfeng	10.36
200 metres (Wind: -0.4 m/s)	Xie Zhenye	20.72	Yan Haibin	20.86	Tang Xingqiang	20.94
400 metres	Guo Zhongze	46.43	Yang Lei	46.46	Zhang Zhan	47.41
800 metres	Xia Chenyu	1:51.75	Li Junlin	1:51.79	Liu Dezhu	1:52.16
1500 metres	Qi Liang	3:45.25	Liu Dezhu	3:45.54	Li Xinming	3:45.72
5000 metres	Peng Jianhua	14:13.78	Qi Zhenfei	14:16.95	Zhao Changhong	14:20.74
10,000 metres	Dong Guojian	29:35.46	Zhao Changhong	29:40.67	Du Bujie	30:02.67
110 m hurdles (Wind: +0.4 m/s)	Xie Wenjun	13.24	Zeng Jianhang	13.54	Ning Xiaohan	13.60
400 m hurdles	Feng Zhiqiang	50.43	Shang Shuo	50.65	Wang Hongwen	51.15
3000 m s'chase	Luo Chun	8:59.53	Peng Jianqi	9:02.01	Qi Liang	9:03.23
4 × 100 metres relay	Guangdong; Huang Yonglian; Chen Guanfeng; Zheng Ruixian; Mo Youxue	39.00	Hubei; Hou Shaoqing; Yang Yang; Wu Zhiqiang; Guo Yiyang	39.17	Sichuan; Tang Cheng; Zhong Zhihao; Wang Qi; Deng Zhijian	39.96
4 × 400 metres relay	Sichuan; Luo Hao; Zhu Zilong; Fan Tianrui; Yang Lei	3:08.32	Shandong; Yu Yang; Zhu Chenbin; Deng Hantao; Xie Yuqiang	3:09.65	Hebei; Meng Xinpeng; Yang Baichuan; Feng Qixuan; Shang Shuo	3:10.06
High jump	Li Jialun	2.24 m	Wang Yu	2.20 m	Sun Zhao	2.20 m
Pole vault	Yao Jie	5.40 m	Zhang Wei	5.30 m	Song Haoyang	5.00 m
Long jump	Wang Jianan	8.36 m (+0.3)	Huang Chanzhou	8.33 m (+0.5)	Zhang Yaoguang	7.98 m (+0.3)
Triple jump	Wu Ruiting	6.90 m (+0.2)	Zhu Yaming	6.79 m (+0.2)	Fang Yaoqing	6.64 m (+0.4)
Shot put	Tian Zhizhong	19.51 m	Jie Feng	19.24 m	Chen Xiaodong	18.91 m
Discus throw	Sun Shichen	58.40 m	Abuduaini Tuergong	58.19 m	Wang Yuhan	55.12 m
Hammer throw	Wang Shizhu	71.89 m	Wang Qi	70.87 m	Jiang He	67.64 m
Javelin throw	Ma Qun	81.13 m	Zhao Qinggang	75.78 m	Zhu Kai	74.65 m
Decathlon	Guo Qi	7405 pts NWI	Hu Yufei	7313 pts	Gong Kewei	7217 pts

=== Women ===
Event	Gold		Silver		Bronze	
100 metres (Wind: −0.2 m/s)	Ge Manqi	11.35	Liao Mengxue	11.53	Kong Lingwei	11.56
200 metres (Wind: −1.2 m/s)	Kong Lingwei	23.64	Tong Zenghuan	23.73	Cai Yanting	24.17
400 metres	Yang Huizhen	52.67	Liu Guojuan	52.70	Cheng Chong	53.79
800 metres	Wang Chunyu	2:04.79	Rao Xinyu	2:07.63	Hu Zhiying	2:08.81
1500 metres	Hu Zhiying	4:27.98	Xu Shuangshuang	4:28.20	Wang Wenfei	4:28.40
5000 metres	Xu Shuangshuang	16:18.08	Wang Wenfei	16:18.99	Zhang Deshun	16:19.97
10,000 metres	Zhang Deshun	33:26.85	Xia Yuyu	33:27.29	Zhao Yanli	33:28.92
100 m hurdles (Wind: -0.4 m/s)	Wu Yanni	13.09	Lin Yuwei	13.22	Wang Dou	13.40
400 m hurdles	Mo Jiadie	56.77	Lu Changwei	57.89	Huang Yan	58.68
3000 m s'chase	Xu Shuangshuang	9:56.53	Zhang Xinyan	10:01.22	Qiao Yumeng	10:09.10
4 × 100 metres relay	Guangdong; Zhang Shuo; Zhu Cuiwei; Zhu Cuiyan; Liang Xiaojing	44.41	Fujian; Jiangli Yunzhe; Lin Yuwei; Lin Xinyi; Ge Manqi	44.70	Hunan; Chen Qianqian; Tong Zenghuan; Huang Guifen; Liao Mengxue	44.88
4 × 400 metres relay	Sichuan; He Miaoge; Lei Yelan; Zhang Yu; Yang Huizhen	3:38.66	Jiangsu; Huang Yan; Liu Yutong; Pan Gaoqin; Lu Changwei	3:39.24	Guangdong; Liang Nuo; Yan Hailing; Zhang Guiping; Mo Jiadie	3:43.36
High jump	Huang Min	1.80 m	Zhang Chunlu	1.80 m	Hu Linpeng	1.75 m
Pole vault	Song Tingting	4.30 m	Li Ling	4.30 m	Niu Chunge	4.30 m
Long jump	Guo Sijia	6.48 m (+1.0)	Qi Huiling	6.47 m (+0.3)	Chen Liwen	6.36 m (+1.0)
Triple jump	Li Ying	14.02 m (+1.3)	Tan Qiujiao	13.87 m (0.0)	Zeng Rui	13.86 m (+0.1)
Shot put	Gao Yang	17.98 m	Jiang Yue	17.63 m	Zhang Linru	16.92 m
Discus throw	Chen Yang	60.80 m	Feng Bin	59.55 m	Su Xinyue	58.19 m
Hammer throw	Luo Na	69.19 m	Ji Li	68.26 m	Xu Xinying	66.84 m
Javelin throw	Liu Shiying	67.29 m	Lü Huihui	65.70 m	Su Lingdan	59.59 m
Heptathlon	Ren Shimei	5746 pts	Zhou Jingjing	5525 pts	Shen Muhan	5352 pts

== Mixed ==
=== Women ===
Event	Gold		Silver		Bronze	
4 × 400 metres relay	Sichuan; He Miaoge; Mou Chunjun; Yang Huizhen; Yang Lei	3:21.16	Guangdong; Yan Hailing; Mao Guorong; Mo Jiadie; Lu Zhiquan	3:21.81	Shandong; Hao Miao; Deng Hantao; Cheng Chong; Xie Yuqiang	3:22.54

== See also ==
- Chinese Athletics Championships
- 2010 Chinese Athletics Championships
