= 2010 Chinese Athletics Championships =

- Dates: 5–8 August
- Host city: Jinan, China

The 2010 Chinese Athletics Championships (Chinese: 全国田径锦标赛圆满 2010) was the year's national outdoor track and field championships for China. It was held from 5–8 August in Jinan. It served as the qualifying meet for China at the 2010 Asian Games. The highlight of the competition was a Chinese national record of 5.75 metres in the men's pole vault by Yang Yansheng.

== Results ==
=== Men ===
Event	Gold		Silver		Bronze	
100 metres	Lao Yi	10.31	Liang Jiahong	10.33	Zheng Dongsheng	10.35
200 metres	Liang Jiahong	20.83	Zhang Feng	20.87	Lu Shangbin	20.94
400 metres	Chang Pengben	45.98	Liu Xiaosheng	46.34	You Cheng	46.50
800 metres	Yang Xiaofei	1:47.63	Jiang Yongchao	1:49.05	Zhang Haikun	1:49.10
1500 metres	Jiang Bing	3:45.70	Zhang Guolin	3:45.81	Gu Ming	3:46.15
5000 metres	Gao Laiyuan	14:13.27	Tian Mengxu	14:13.30	Li Zicheng	14:14.29
10,000 metres	Li Fei	29:25.13	Dong Guojian	29:27.81	Li Zicheng	29:51.43
3000 m s'chase	Lin Xiangqian	8:47.34	Yang Le	8:48.92	Wang Zhongrui	8:51.26
110 m hurdles	Shi Dongpeng	13.40	Xie Wenjun	13.47	Huang Hao	13.62
400 m hurdles	Meng Yan	49.69	Cheng Wen	49.89	Chen Ke	50.51
High jump	Huang Haiqiang	2.24	Wang Chen Zhang Guowei	2.20	Not awarded	
Pole vault	Yang Yansheng	5.75 NR	Xia Xiang Lu Yao	5.35	Not awarded	
Long jump	Su Xiongfeng	8.17	Li Jinzhe	8.12	Zhao Xiaoxi	7.92
Triple jump	Wu Bo	16.81	Cao Shuo	16.77	Dong Bin	16.72
Shot put	Zhang Jun	19.73	Wang Like	19.18	Guo Yanxiang	18.79
Discus throw	Wu Jian	59.45	Sun Deyi	56.13	Hu Tai	55.39
Hammer throw	Wan Yong	67.39	Dan Zhangcheng	66.47	Zhai Deyi	66.12
Javelin throw	Qin Qiang	78.59	Jiang Xingyu	78.52	Chen Qi	78.27
Decathlon	Yu Bin	7646 pts	Jiang Xingyu	7478 pts	Liu Haibo	7347 pts
4 × 100 metres relay	?	39.39	Guangdong	39.48	Shandong	39.75
4 × 400 metres relay	Sichuan	3:06.04	Guangdong	3:06.13	Liaoning	3:06.13

=== Women ===
Event	Gold		Silver		Bronze	
100 metres	Tao Yujia	11.42	Liang Qiuping	11.56	Ye Jiabei	11.71
200 metres	Liang Qiuping	23.43	Zhao Yanmin	23.73	Zheng Jiaqian	23.84
400 metres	Tang Xiaoyin	53.22	Chen Lin	53.26	Zhao Yanmin	53.58
800 metres	Zhao Jing	2:04.29	Tong Xiaomei	2:05.19	Zhang Xiaojun	2:07.08
1500 metres	Su Qian	4:17.06	Liu Fang	4:17.82	Wang Yanfei	4:18.42
5000 metres	Xue Fei	15:41.60	Sun Lamei	15:42.01	Hao Xiaofan	15:42.74
10,000 metres	Bai Xue	32:53.24	Zhang Xin	33:39.66	Sun Lamei	33:44.97
3000 m s'chase	Jin Yuan	9:52.92	Li Zhenzhu	9:57.38	Wang Kaiqiu	10:03.50
100 m hurdles	Sun Yawei	13.13	Wu Tingting	13.48	Zhang Rong	13.52
400 m hurdles	Wang Xing	56.54	Yang Qi	56.77	Ruan Zhuofen	56.78
High jump	Zheng Xingjuan	1.91	Chen Yanjun	1.84	Gu Xuan	1.84
Pole vault	Li Caixia	4.45	Li Ling	4.40	Wu Sha	4.30
Long jump	Lu Minjia	6.47	Chen Yaling	6.42	Liu Xiao	6.28
Triple jump	Xie Limei	14.01	Chen Yufei	13.78	Liu Yanan	13.73
Shot put	Gong Lijiao	19.52	Li Ling	18.59	Liu Xiangrong	18.44
Discus throw	Li Yanfeng	65.83	Song Aimin	63.62	Xu Shaoyang	59.94
Hammer throw	Zhang Wenxiu	73.83	Wang Zheng	67.81	Yang Youyu	66.77
Javelin throw	Xue Juan	61.51	Li Lingwei	60.60	Zhang Li	59.55
Heptathlon	Mei Yiduo	5429 pts	Sun Lu	5364 pts	Chen Rui	5278 pts
4 × 100 metres relay	Guangxi	44.57	Zhejiang	45.13	Guangdong	45.54
4 × 400 metres relay	Guangdong	3:31.50	Shandong	3:34.80	Shanghai	3:36.89

== Racewalking ==
The Chinese Racewalking Championships were held on 14–16 March in Huangshan.

Event	Gold		Silver		Bronze	
20 km walk men	Li Jianbo	1:21:08	Chu Yafei	1:21:30	Yu Wei	1:21:53
50 km walk men	Li Lei	3:47:53	Du Yunpeng	3:51:37	Xu Faguang	3:53:16
20 km walk women	Liu Hong	1:30:29	Shi Yang	1:32:11	Yang Yawei	1:32:46

== Half marathon ==
The Chinese Half Marathon Championships were held on 25 April in Yangzhou.

Event	Gold		Silver		Bronze	
Men	Gao Laiyuan	1:03:49	Yang Dinghong	1:03:51	Zhang Zhongji	1:04:54
Women	Jin Lingling	1:12:28	Hao Xiaofan	1:12:43	Luo Chuan	1:15:04

== See also ==
- Chinese Athletics Championships
- 2020 Chinese Athletics Championships
