= Sayaka Oishi =

Japanese sprinter (born 1991)

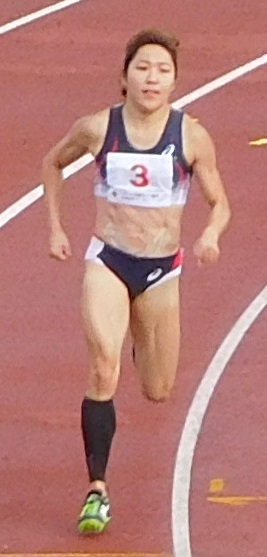
- Oishi at the 2019 National Sports Festival

Personal information
- Nationality: Japanese
- Born: Sayaka Fujisawa; 11 March 1991 (age 35) Takizawa, Iwate, Japan
- Education: Iwate University
- Height: 1.65 m (5 ft 5 in)

Sport
- Country: Japan
- Sport: Track and field
- Event: Sprint
- Club: Cerespo

Achievements and titles
- Personal best(s): 100 m: 11.81 (2016) 200 m: 23.78 (2020); 300 m: 38.09 (2017) 400 m: 53.14 (2015)

Sayaka Oishi (大石 沙也加, Ōishi Sayaka; née Fujisawa (藤沢), born 11 March 1991 in Takizawa, Iwate) is a Japanese sprinter. She finished fourth in the 4 × 400 metres relay at the 2015 Asian Championships. She was also the reserve relay member at the 2019 World Relays but was not selected to run.

== Personal bests ==
Event	Time (s)	Competition	Venue	Date	Notes
100 m	11.81 (wind: +1.2 m/s)	Nippon Sport Science University Meet	Yokohama, Japan	10 September 2016	
200 m	23.78 (wind: -0.1 m/s)	Japanese Championships	Niigata, Japan	3 October 2020	
300 m	38.09	Izumo Meet	Izumo, Japan	22 April 2017	
400 m	53.14	Japanese Championships	Niigata, Japan	27 June 2015	

== International competition ==
Year	Competition	Venue	Position	Event	Time
Representing Japan
2015	Asian Championships	Wuhan, China	4th	4×400 m relay	3:35.93 (relay leg: 1st)
