= Wang Zhen (high jumper) =

Chinese high jumper (born 2001)

Personal information
- Native name: Chinese: 王振
- Nationality: China
- Born: October 7, 2001 (age 24)
- Home town: Jiangsu, China
- Height: 193 cm (6 ft 4 in)
- Weight: 75 kg (165 lb)

Sport
- Sport: Sport of athletics
- Event: High jump

Achievements and titles
- National finals: 2016 Chinese U16s; • High jump, 1st (gold); 2017 Chinese U18s; • High jump, 1st (gold); 2021 Chinese Champs; • High jump, 2nd (silver); 2021 National Games; • High jump, 1st (gold); 2023 Chinese Indoors; • High jump, 4th
- Personal best: HJ: 2.32m (2023)
- Updated on 6 April 2024

Wang Zhen (Note: In this Chinese name, the family name is Wang.) (Chinese: 王振; born 7 October 2001) is a Chinese high jumper. He was the 2021 Chinese National Games gold medalist in the high jump, and he set his personal best of 2.32 m in 2023.

== Career ==
Wang won his first national titles at the Chinese U16 and U18 championships in 2016 and 2017. After finishing runner-up at the 2021 Chinese Athletics Championships, he won the 2021 National Games of China in the high jump.

Wang first represented China internationally at the 2023 Asian Indoor Athletics Championships, where he qualified for the finals but did not clear any height in the finals. At the 2021 World University Games (delayed to 2023 due to the COVID-19 pandemic), he tied for 6th in the finals.

In May 2023, Wang set his personal best of 2.32 m in winning the 3rd stop of the Chinese Athletics Street Circuit. It tied the best Asian mark of the 2023 season and qualified him for the 2023 World Athletics Championships, although Wang did not compete there.

In 2024, Wang finished tied for 4th at the Diamond League opener in Xiamen.

== Personal life ==
Wang is from Jiangsu, China. He has been said to have replaced Wang Yu as the leader of China in the high jump.

== Statistics ==
=== Personal best progression ===
High Jump progression
#	Mark	Pl.	Competition	Venue	Date	Ref.
1	2.00 m	1st place, gold medalist(s)	National U16 Championships	Nanchang, China	17 Jul 2016	
2	2.24 m	2nd place, silver medalist(s)	National Indoor GP	Jinan, China	17 Mar 2021	
3	2.28 m	1st place, gold medalist(s)	Yangtze River Delta Elite Meeting	Shaoxing, China	8 Apr 2021	
4	2.30 m	1st place, gold medalist(s)	China Athletics Street Tour	Nanjing, China	14 May 2021	
5	2.25 m	1st place, gold medalist(s)	CAA Training Base Indoor Permit Meeting	Nanjing, China	4 Mar 2022	
6	2.32 m	1st place, gold medalist(s)	Chinese Athletics Street Tour 3	Nanjing, China	26 May 2023	
