= Athletics at the 2015 Summer Universiade – Women's 400 metres =

The women's 400 metres event at the 2015 Summer Universiade was held on 8, 9 and 10 July at the Gwangju Universiade Main Stadium.

== Medalists ==
Gold	Silver	Bronze
Justine Palframan; South Africa	Małgorzata Hołub; Poland	Yang Huizhen; China

== Results ==
=== Heats ===
Qualification: First 4 in each heat (Q) and next 4 fastest (q) qualified for the semifinals.

Rank	Heat	Name	Nationality	Time	Notes
1	2	Yang Huizhen	China	53.09	Q
2	2	Ruth Spelmeyer	Germany	53.14	Q
3	1	Małgorzata Hołub	Poland	53.47	Q
4	2	Kristina Malvinova	Russia	53.57	Q, SB
5	3	Justine Palframan	South Africa	53.61	Q
6	1	Sanda Belgyan	Romania	53.75	Q
7	1	Tamara Salaški	Serbia	53.81	Q
7	5	Iveta Putalová	Slovakia	53.81	Q
9	3	Marta Milani	Italy	53.90	Q
10	3	Tovea Jenkins	Jamaica	53.92	Q
11	4	Leni Shida	Uganda	54.03	Q
12	4	Justyna Święty	Poland	54.18	Q
13	4	Yuliya Rakhmanova	Kazakhstan	54.22	Q
14	4	Liliya Gafiyatullina	Russia	54.42	Q
15	2	Olesea Cojuhari	Moldova	54.56	Q
16	5	Madeline Kopp	United States	54.93	Q
17	5	Eva Misiūnaitė	Lithuania	55.24	Q
18	1	Pornpan Hoemhuk	Thailand	55.98	Q
18	5	Camelia-Florina Gal	Romania	55.98	Q
20	3	Helin Meier	Estonia	56.96	Q, SB
21	4	Jiang Dan	China	57.04	q
22	5	Halimah Nakaayi	Uganda	57.65	q
23	4	Annika Sakkarias	Estonia	58.36	q, PB
24	3	Jingky Obanon	Philippines	59.04	q
25	4	Rathnayaka Mudiyanselage	Sri Lanka	59.43	
26	1	Lory Tachjian	Lebanon	1:03.69	
27	2	Sabrina Adala	Algeria	1:03.70	SB
28	3	Chitoshi Musonda	Zambia	1:04.88	
	5	Marian Domfe	Ghana	DQ	R163.3
	1	Patience Okon George	Nigeria	DNS	
	1	Memory Remadji Mbaiba	Chad	DNS	

=== Semifinals ===
Qualification: First 2 in each heat (Q) and the next 2 fastest (q) qualified for the final.

Rank	Heat	Name	Nationality	Time	Notes
1	2	Justine Palframan	South Africa	52.23	Q, SB
2	3	Yang Huizhen	China	52.43	Q
3	2	Iveta Putalová	Slovakia	52.55	Q
4	1	Małgorzata Hołub	Poland	52.66	Q
5	1	Marta Milani	Italy	52.76	Q, SB
6	2	Justyna Święty	Poland	52.77	q
7	3	Ruth Spelmeyer	Germany	52.78	Q
8	3	Sanda Belgyan	Romania	52.88	q, PB
9	1	Kristina Malvinova	Russia	53.19	SB
10	3	Tamara Salaški	Serbia	53.29	
11	1	Leni Shida	Uganda	53.40	
12	1	Yuliya Rakhmanova	Kazakhstan	53.40	
13	3	Tovea Jenkins	Jamaica	53.43	
14	2	Liliya Gafiyatullina	Russia	53.61	
15	1	Olesea Cojuhari	Moldova	54.28	
16	2	Madeline Kopp	United States	54.71	
17	2	Eva Misiūnaitė	Lithuania	54.88	SB
18	3	Pornpan Hoemhuk	Thailand	55.93	
19	1	Camelia-Florina Gal	Romania	56.81	
19	2	Jiang Dan	China	56.81	PB
21	2	Halimah Nakaayi	Uganda	57.13	SB
22	3	Helin Meier	Estonia	57.17	
23	1	Annika Sakkarias	Estonia	58.00	PB
24	3	Jingky Obanon	Philippines	58.89	

=== Final ===
Official Video

Rank	Lane	Name	Nationality	Time	Notes
1st place, gold medalist(s)	5	Justine Palframan	South Africa	51.27	PB
2nd place, silver medalist(s)	4	Małgorzata Hołub	Poland	51.93	SB
3rd place, bronze medalist(s)	3	Yang Huizhen	China	51.98	PB
4	8	Ruth Spelmeyer	Germany	52.04	PB
5	6	Iveta Putalová	Slovakia	52.18	PB
6	1	Justyna Święty	Poland	52.44	SB
7	7	Marta Milani	Italy	53.06	
8	2	Sanda Belgyan	Romania	53.36	
