= Athletics at the 2021 National Games of China =

Athletics at the 14th National Games of China
- Dates: 20–26 September
- Host city: Shaanxi, PR China
- Venue: Xi'an Olympic Sports Center Stadium
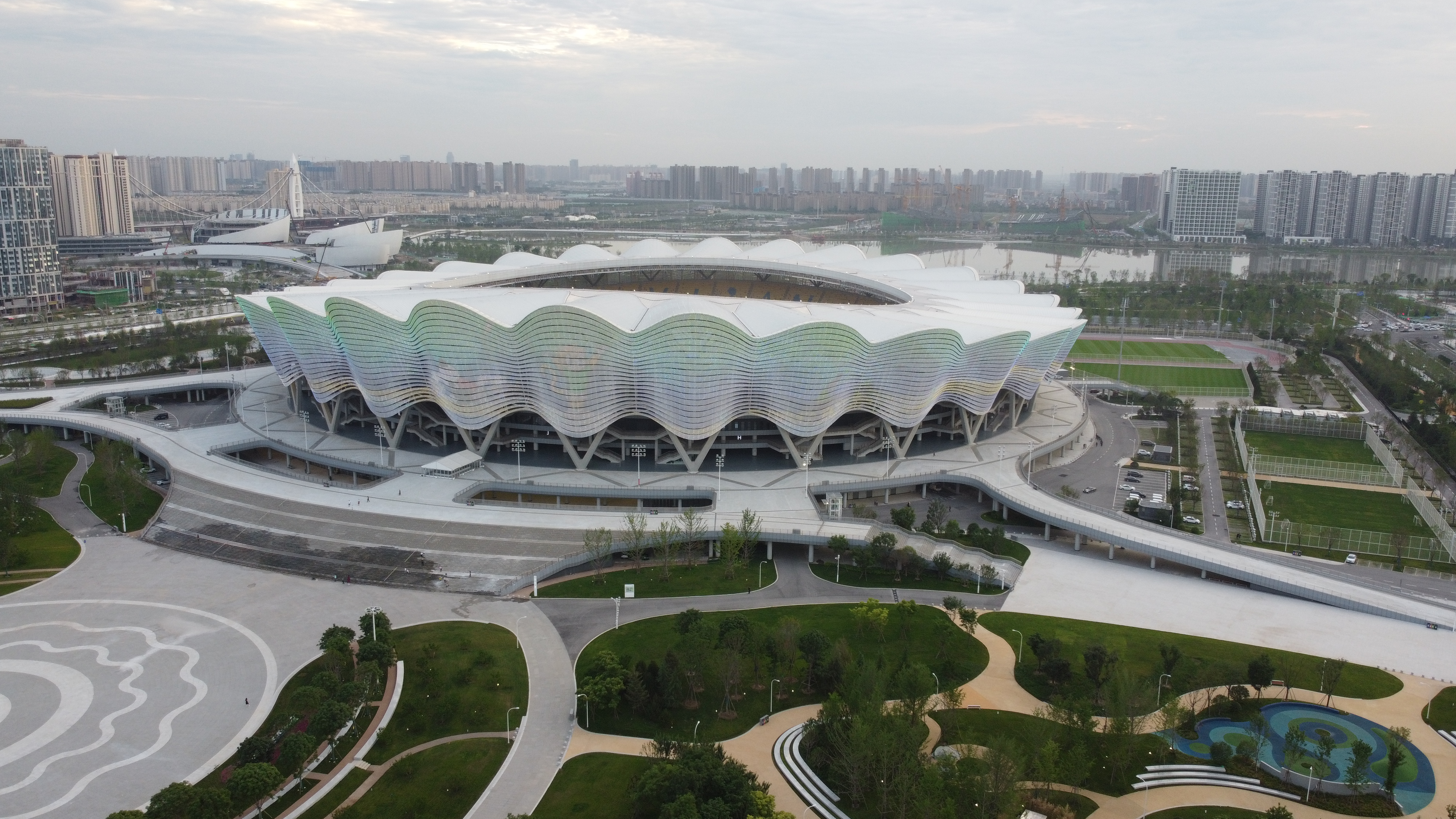
- Level: Senior
- Events: 48

At the 2021 National Games of China, the athletics events were held at the Xi'an Olympic Sports Center Stadium in Shaanxi, People's Republic of China from 20 to 26 September 2021. The marathon events were held on 26 September at the Xi’an Marathon Venue.

== Medal summary ==
=== Men ===
Event	Gold		Silver		Bronze	
100m	Su Bingtian; China	9.95	Xie Zhenye; China	10.10	Wu Zhiqiang; China	10.18
200m	Tang Xingqiang; China	20.39	Xie Zhenye; China	20.43	Chao Sheng; China	20.48
400m	Yang Lei; China	45.54	Jingzong Zhang; China	45.66	Wu Yuang; China	45.96
800m	Li Junlin; China	1:48.33	Xiaoheng Xi; China	1:48.37	Liu Dezhu; China	1:48.54
1500m	Liang Qi; China	3:47.98	Junjie You; China	3:48.22	Liu Dezhu; China	3:48.99
5000m	Duo Bujie; China	13:49.16	Qinghua Zong; China	13:50.19	Guangyue Ren; China	13:56.04
10,000m	Duo Bujie; China	28:35.24	Dong Guojian; China	28:50.00	Guangyue Ren; China	29:04.29
Marathon	Dongzhibu Renqing; China	2:14:26	Peng Jianhua; China	2:14:31	Yang Shaohui; China	2:14:45
110mH	Xie Wenjun; China	13.37	Ning Xiaohan; China	13.45	Zhenjiang Sun; China	13.51
400mH	Xie Zhiyu; China	49.67	Cai Junqi; China	50.15	Anan Ye; China	50.33
3000mSC	Pengcheng Xu; China	8:46.97	Zhaxi Ciren; China	8:49.61	Jinzheng Wang; China	8:50.11
20 km Race Walk	Zhang Jun; China	1:20:12	Wang Kaihua; China	1:20:54	Shuai Sun; China	1:20:56
4 × 100 m	PR of China; China; Tang Xingqiang; Xie Zhenye; Su Bingtian; Wu Zhiqiang	38.50	Jiangsu; China; Yang Yang; Xu Haiyang; Weiyi Lu; Shi Yuhao	38.67	Sichuan; China; Zhihong Wang; Cheng Chen; Qi Wang; Deng Zhijian	38.83
4 × 200 m	Shandong; China; Shengjie Wang; Yuqiang Xie; Yaorong Zhang; Zhen Qiao	1:20.83	Guangdong; China; Su Bingtian; Ruixuan Zhang; Mo Youxue; Yan Haibin	1:20.83	Sichuan; China; Yuchen Liu; Zhihong Wang; Qi Wang; Cheng Chen	1:21.12
4 × 400 m	Sichuan; China; Chunjun Mou; Hao Luo; Fan Tianrui; Yang Lei	3:04.27	Tianjin; China; Songao Li; Zhipeng Yan; Jiarui Bai; Tianqi Ju	3:05.02	Shandong; China; Yaorong Zhang; Zhen Qiao; Chenbin Zhu; Hantao Deng	3:05.53
50 km Race Walk	Bian Tongda; China	3:52:16	He Xianghong; China	3:52:30	Yangben Zhaxi; China	3:53:48
Decathlon	Qingming Wen; China	6821	Guo Qi; China	6837	Xuesong Yue; China	6970
Discus Throw	Abuduaini Tuergong; China	60.58 m	Shichen Sun; China	58.06 m	Shitu MA; China	57.89 m
Hammer Throw	Wang Qi; China	73.47 m	Qi Zhang; China	69.88 m	Wang Shizhu; China	69.72 m
High Jump	Wang Zhen; China	2.24 m	Jialun Li; China	2.24 m	Wang Yu; China	2.20 m
Javelin Throw	Jiajie Xu; China	84.54 m	Zhao Qinggang; China	82.58 m	Hu Haoran; China	82.14 m
Long Jump	Wang Jianan; China	8.26 m	Huang Changzhou; China	8.21 m	Zhang Mingkun; China	7.98 m
Pole Vault	Yao Jie; China	5.80 m	Ding Bangchao; China	5.65 m	Huang Bokai; China	5.60 m
Shot Put	Liu Yang; China	20.40 m	Tian Zizhong; China	20.35 m	Li Jun; China	19.58 m
Triple Jump	Wu Ruiting; China	17.28 m	Fang Yaoqing; China	17.04 m	Pangshuai Li; China	16.86 m

=== Women ===
Event	Gold		Silver		Bronze	
100m	Ge Manqi; China	11.22	Yuan Qiqi; China	11.39	Liang Xiaojing; China	11.40
200m	Ge Manqi; China	23.05	Yanting Cai; China	23.13	Liang Xiaojing; China	23.25
400m	Yang Huizhen; China	51.63	Wang Chunyu; China	52.00	Tong Zenghuan; China	52.17
800m	Wang Chunyu; China	2:01.02	Rao Xinyu; China	2:02.38	Hu Zhiying; China	2:03.67
1500m	Wang Chunyu; China	4:16.61	Hu Zhiying; China	4:17.25	Zheng Xiaoqian; China	4:17.60
5000m	Zhang Xinyan; China	15:53.92	Zhang Deshun; China	15:54.30	Xu Shuangshuang; China	15:54.38
10,000m	Zhang Deshun; China	32:36.60	Xia Yuyu; China	32:38.13	He Wuga; China	32:40.52
Marathon	Zhang Deshun; China	2:32:31	Li Zhixuan; China	2:32:34	Ying Lu; China	2:32:38
100mH	Lin Yuwei; China	12.88	Wu Yanni; China	12.91	Wang Dou; China	13.00
400mH	Mo Jiadie; China	54.89	Changwei Lu; China	56.57	Hongyan Wang; China	57.26
3000mSC	Zhang Xinyan; China	9:26.63	Xu Shuangshuang; China	9:31.67	Xia Luo; China	9:41.36
20 km Race Walk	Yang Jiayu; China	1:27:14	Qieyang Shijie; China	1:27:31	Yang Liujing; China	1:27:47
4 × 100 m	PR of China; China; Liang Xiaojing; Ge Manqi; Huang Guifen; Wei Yongli	42.72	Jiangsu; China; Yunzhu Gu; Yanting Cai; Yanbing Zhou; Yuan Qiqi	43.87	Guangdong; China; Shuo Zhang; Cuiwei Zhu; Cuiyan Zhu; Chen Shuiqing	44.01
4 × 400 m	Jiangsu; China; Ke He; Mengxue Liao; Huang Guifen; Tong Zenghuan	3:30.21	Hainan; China; Miaoge He; Yinglan Liu; Yelan Lei; Yang Huizhen	3:33.12	Sichuan; China; Shiya Guo; Fengdan Li; Huang Jiaxin; Guojuan Liu	3:33.76
Discus Throw	Feng Bin; China	65.85 m	Chen Yang; China	63.90 m	Xie Yuchen; China	58.11 m
Hammer Throw	Wang Zheng; China	74.65 m	Li Jiangyan; China	74.47 m	Luo Na; China	73.72 m
Heptathlon	Rui Kong; China	4585	Hua Yang; China	4774	Xuhui Zhang; China	4862
High Jump	Lu Jiawen; China	1.92 m	Liu Yi; China	1.90 m	Chunlu Zhang; China	1.84 m
Javelin Throw	Liu Shiying; China	64.33 m	Lü Huihui; China	62.43 m	Lijuan Ge; China	58.54 m
Long Jump	Luying Gong; China	6.46 m	Mengyi Tan; China	6.46 m	Shihui Hua; China	6.30 m
Pole Vault	Li Ling; China	4.70 m	Xu Huiqin; China	4.55 m	Chen Qiaoling; China	4.50 m
Shot Put	Gong Lijiao; China	19.88 m	Song Jiayuan; China	19.76 m	Zhang Linru; China	18.37 m
Triple Jump	Qiujiao Tan; China	14.34 m	Zeng Rui; China	14.10 m	Jie Chen; China	13.81 m
