= 2015 Asian Athletics Championships – Women's 400 metres =

The women's 400 metres event at the 2015 Asian Athletics Championships was held on the 3 and 4 of June.

== Medalists ==
| Gold | Yang Huizhen; China |
| Silver | M. R. Poovamma; India |
| Bronze | Anastassiya Kudinova; Kazakhstan |

== Results ==
=== Heats ===
First 3 in each heat (Q) and the next 2 fastest (q) qualified for the final.

| Rank | Heat | Name | Nationality | Time | Notes |
|---|---|---|---|---|---|
| 1 | 2 | M. R. Poovamma | India | 52.94 | Q |
| 2 | 2 | Yang Huizhen | China | 53.68 | Q |
| 3 | 2 | Yuliya Rakhmanova | Kazakhstan | 54.00 | Q |
| 4 | 1 | Chandrika Mudiyanselage | Sri Lanka | 54.18 | Q |
| 5 | 1 | Anastassiya Kudinova | Kazakhstan | 54.49 | Q |
| 6 | 2 | Asami Chiba | Japan | 55.52 | q |
| 7 | 1 | Sayaka Aoki | Japan | 55.61 | Q |
| 8 | 2 | Srimaya Sari | Indonesia | 55.93 | q |
| 9 | 1 | Jo Eun-ju | South Korea | 56.74 | |
| 10 | 2 | Lam Christy Ho Yan | Hong Kong | 58.07 | |
| 11 | 1 | Chua Yan Ching | Hong Kong | 59.09 | |
| 12 | 1 | Aminath Nazra | Maldives | 1:05.84 | |
| | 1 | Cheng Chong | China | DNF | |

=== Final ===
| Rank | Lane | Name | Nationality | Result | Notes |
|---|---|---|---|---|---|
| 1st place, gold medalist(s) | 5 | Yang Huizhen | China | 52.37 | |
| 2nd place, silver medalist(s) | 4 | M. R. Poovamma | India | 53.07 | |
| 3rd place, bronze medalist(s) | 3 | Anastassiya Kudinova | Kazakhstan | 53.41 | |
| 4 | 8 | Yuliya Rakhmanova | Kazakhstan | 53.66 | |
| 5 | 6 | Chandrika Mudiyanselage | Sri Lanka | 54.24 | |
| 6 | 7 | Sayaka Aoki | Japan | 54.61 | |
| 7 | 1 | Asami Chiba | Japan | 54.71 | |
| 8 | 2 | Srimaya Sari | Indonesia | 56.28 | |
