= 2023 Asian Athletics Championships – Men's 800 metres =

Men's 800 metres at the 2023 Asian Athletics Championships
- Venue: National Stadium
- Location: Bangkok, Thailand
- Dates: 15 July (heats); 16 July (final)
- Competitors: 24 from 19 nations
- Winning time: 1:45.53

Medalists
gold medal	Abubaker Haydar Abdalla	Qatar
silver medal	Krishan Kumar	India
bronze medal	Ebrahim Al-Zofairi	Kuwait

The men's 800 metres event at the 2023 Asian Athletics Championships was held on 15 and 16 July.

== Records ==
Records before the 2023 Asian Athletics Championships
Record	Athlete (nation)	Time (s)	Location	Date
World record	David Rudisha (KEN)	1:40.91	London, United Kingdom	9 August 2012
Asian record	Yusuf Saad Kamel (BHR)	1:42.79	Fontvieille, Monaco	29 July 2008
Championship record	Majed Saeed Sultan (QAT)	1:44.27	Incheon, South Korea	4 September 2005
World leading	Emmanuel Wanyonyi (KEN)	1:43.27	Paris, France	9 June 2023
Asian leading	Mohammed Afsal (IND)	1:46.17	Oordegem, Belgium	27 May 2023

== Results ==
=== Heats ===
Qualification rule: First 2 in each heat (Q) and the next 2 fastest (q) qualified for the final.

Rank	Heat	Name	Nationality	Time	Notes
1	1	Abubaker Haydar Abdalla	Qatar	1:48.78	Q
2	1	Liu Dezhu	China	1:48.85	Q
3	1	Mohammed Afsal	India	1:48.86	q
4	2	Krishan Kumar	India	1:48.97	Q
5	2	Abdirahman Saeed Hassan	Qatar	1:48.99	Q
6	3	Abdullah Al-Yaari	Yemen	1:49.33	Q
7	3	Ebrahim Al-Zofairi	Kuwait	1:49.38	Q
8	2	Sho Kawamoto	Japan	1:49.40	q
9	2	Hussain Mohsen Al-Farisi	Oman	1:49.50	
10	3	Mikuto Kaneko	Japan	1:49.73	
11	2	Chhun Bunthorn	Cambodia	1:50.09	NR
12	1	Mohammed Al-Suleimani	Oman	1:50.54	
13	3	Sobhan Ahmadi	Iran	1:50.71	
14	1	Muhamad Fazri Wan Zahary	Malaysia	1:50.94	PB
15	1	Musulman Dzholomanov	Kyrgyzstan	1:51.27	
16	1	Kumal Som Bahadur	Nepal	1:51.70	
17	3	Abdulaziz Ladan Mohamed	Saudi Arabia	1:51.89	
18	2	Lương Đức Phước	Vietnam	1:52.89	
19	3	Li An-yi	Chinese Taipei	1:53.84	
20	3	Dawaanyam Myagmarsuren	Mongolia	1:54.21	PB
21	2	Hussain Riza	Maldives	1:54.59	
22	3	Avinesh Austin	Malaysia	1:55.29	
23	2	Mohammed Dwedar	Palestine	1:56.06	
24	1	Manuel Belo Amaral Ataide	Timor-Leste	2:02.95	

=== Final ===
Rank	Name	Nationality	Time	Notes
1st place, gold medalist(s)	Abubaker Haydar Abdalla	Qatar	1:45.53	SB
2nd place, silver medalist(s)	Krishan Kumar	India	1:45.88	PB
3rd place, bronze medalist(s)	Ebrahim Al-Zofairi	Kuwait	1:46.11	
4	Liu Dezhu	China	1:46.77	PB
5	Abdirahman Saeed Hassan	Qatar	1:46.81	SB
6	Abdullah Al-Yaari	Yemen	1:48.71	
7	Mohammed Afsal	India	1:48.77	
8	Sho Kawamoto	Japan	1:49.59	
