= Ebrahim Al-Zofairi =

Kuwaiti middle-distance runner

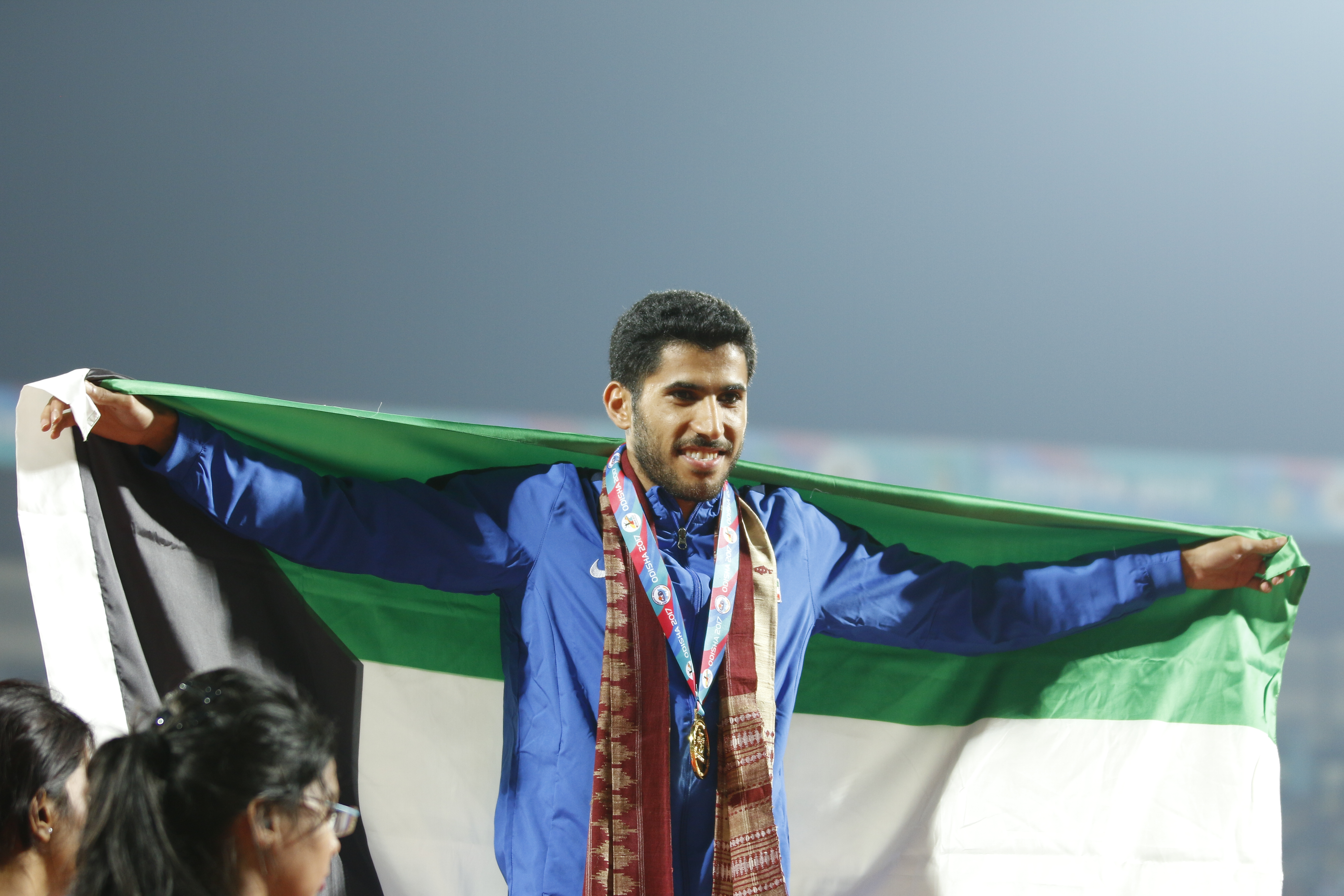

Personal information
- Born: 8 May 1989 (age 37)

Sport
- Sport: Athletics
- Event: 800 metres
Medal record
Men's athletics
Representing Kuwait
Asian Championships
Gold medal – first place	2025 Gumi	800 m
Gold medal – first place	2017 Bhubaneshwar	800 m
Silver medal – second place	2019 Doha	800 m
Bronze medal – third place	2023 Bangkok	800 m
Asian Indoor Championships
Gold medal – first place	2023 Astana	800 m
Gold medal – first place	2024 Tehran	800 m
Silver medal – second place	2014 Hangzhou	800 m
Bronze medal – third place	2018 Tehran	800 m

Ebrahim Remaid Al-Zofairi (Arabic: ابراهيم الظفيري; born 8 May 1989) is a Kuwaiti middle-distance runner who competed primarily in the 800 metres. He won a gold medal at the 2017 Asian Championships.

== International competitions ==
Year	Competition	Venue	Position	Event	Notes
Representing Kuwait
2012	West Asian Championships	Dubai, United Arab Emirates	2nd	800 m	1:52.06
2013	Arab Championships	Doha, Qatar	5th	800 m	1:48.99
2013	Islamic Solidarity Games	Palembang, Indonesia	11th (h)	800 m	1:53.05
2014	Asian Indoor Championships	Hangzhou, China	2nd	800 m	1:50.86
2015	Asian Championships	Wuhan, China	13th (h)	800 m	1:55.79
2017	Asian Championships	Bhubaneswar, India	1st	800 m	1:49.47
2017	World Championships	London, United Kingdom	18th (sf)	800 m	1:46.68
2018	Asian Indoor Championships	Tehran, Iran	3rd	800 m	1:52.97
2018	West Asian Championships	Amman, Jordan	2nd	800 m	1:50.75
2019	Arab Championships	Cairo, Egypt	4th	800 m	1:51.42
2019	Asian Championships	Doha, Qatar	2nd	800 m	1:46.88
2019	Asian Championships	Doha, Qatar	–	1500 m	DNF
2021	Arab Championships	Radès, Tunisia	4th	800 m	1:47.34
2022	GCC Games	Kuwait City, Kuwait	3rd	800 m	1:49.91
2022	Islamic Solidarity Games	Konya, Turkey	5th	800 m	1:48:69
2023	Asian Indoor Championships	Astana, Kazakhstan	1st	800 m	1:49.33
2023	Arab Championships	Marrakesh, Morocco	4th	800 m	1:49.11
2023	Asian Championships	Bangkok, Thailand	3rd	800 m	1:46.11
2023	World Championships	Budapest, Hungary	48th (h)	800 m	1:48.41
2023	Asian Games	Hangzhou, China	6th	800 m	1:49.05
2024	Asian Indoor Championships	Tehran, Iran	1st	800 m	1:46.80
2024	West Asian Championships	Basra, Iraq	1st	800 m	1:47.56
2025	World Indoor Championships	Nanjing, China	13th (sf)	800 m	1:49.37
2025	Asian Championships	Gumi, South Korea	1st	800 m	1:44.59
2025	World Championships	Tokyo, Japan	52nd (h)	800 m	1:47.26
2025	Islamic Solidarity Games	Riyadh, Saudi Arabia	4th	800 m	1:46.30
2026	GCC Games	Doha, Qatar	1st	800 m	1:47.98

== Personal bests ==
Outdoor

- 400 metres – 47.68 (Doha 2014)
- 800 metres – 1:44.59 (Gumi 2025)
- 1500 metres – 3:48.84 (Doha 2025)

Indoor

- 800 metres – 1:46.80 (Tehran 2024)
