= Anastassya Kudinova =

Kazakhstani sprinter (born 1988)

Medal record

Women's athletics

Representing Kazakhstan

Asian Indoor Championships
Silver medal – second place	2012 Hangzhou	Long jump

Anastassya Valeryevna Kudinova (born February 27, 1988) is a Kazakhstani sprinter. She competed at the 2016 Summer Olympics in the women's 400 metres race; her time of 56.03 seconds in the heats did not qualify her for the semifinals. She failed an out-of-competition doping test in July 2016 and was given a four-year ban started from 17 August that year and had her Olympic performance annulled.

She was the long jump silver medallist at the 2012 Asian Indoor Athletics Championships and won individual and relay 400 metres medals at the 2015 Asian Athletics Championships.

== International competitions ==
Year	Competition	Venue	Position	Event	Notes
2012	Asian Indoor Championships	Hangzhou, China	2nd	Long jump	6.23 m
2013	Asian Championships	Pune, India	11th	Long jump	5.67 m
2015	Asian Championships	Wuhan, China	3rd	400 m	53.41
2015	Asian Championships	Wuhan, China	3rd	4 × 400 m relay	3:35.14
2016	Olympic Games	Rio de Janeiro, Brazil	—	400 m	DQ
