= Athletics at the 2015 Summer Universiade – Women's 4 × 100 metres relay =

The women's 4 x 100 metres relay event at the 2015 Summer Universiade was held on 11 and 12 July at the Gwangju Universiade Main Stadium.

== Medalists ==
Gold	Silver	Bronze
Kazakhstan; Anastassiya Tulapina; Svetlana Ivanchukova; Yuliya Rakhmanova; Viktoriya Zyabkina	United States; Ana Holland; Kylie Price; Jade Barber; Nataliyah Friar	Thailand; Supawan Thipat; Phensri Chairoek; Tassaporn Wannakit; Khanrutai Pakdee

== Results ==
=== Heats ===
Qualification: First 3 teams of each heat (Q) plus the next 2 fastest (q) qualified for the final.

Rank	Heat	Nation	Athletes	Time	Notes
1	2	United States	Ana Holland, Kylie Price, Jade Barber, Nataliyah Friar	44.40	Q
2	1	Kazakhstan	Anastassiya Tulapina, Svetlana Ivanchukova, Yuliya Rakhmanova, Viktoriya Zyabkina	44.58	Q
3	1	Canada	Marissa Kurtimah, Brittany Crew, Leah Walkeden, Michelle Young	45.06	Q
4	1	Thailand	Supawan Thipat, Phensri Chairoek, Tassaporn Wannakit, Khanrutai Pakdee	45.14	Q
5	1	Slovakia	Lenka Kršáková, Iveta Putalová, Lucia Slaničková, Alexandra Bezeková	45.29	q
6	2	New Zealand	Rochelle Coster, Fiona Morrison, Kelsey Berryman, Mariah Ririnui	45.64	Q, SB
7	1	China	Qin Wenzhong, Sun Yan, Zhan Qingqing, Lin Huijun	46.26	q
8	2	Estonia	Diana Suumann, Karmen Veerme, Maarja Kalev, Kart Viltrop	46.76	Q
9	1	Slovenia	Simona Kapl, Brina Mljač, Dorotea Rebernik, Saša Babšek	48.62	
	1	Lithuania	Eva Misiūnaitė, Karolina Deliautaitė, Sonata Tamošaitytė, Lina Grinčikaitė-Samuolė	DNF	
	2	Ghana	Abigail Dzamesi, Beatrice Gyaman, Aba Amengu Sam, Dorcas Nimako	DNF	
	2	Russia	Anna Golovina, Yekaterina Kuzina, Olga Kharitonova, Nina Morozova	DNF	
	2	South Africa	Arlene Gowar, Samantha Pretorius, Bevin Smith, Melissa Hewitt	DNF	
	2	Czech Republic		DNS	

=== Final ===
Official Video

Rank	Lane	Nation	Athletes	Time	Notes
1st place, gold medalist(s)	4	Kazakhstan	Anastassiya Tulapina, Svetlana Ivanchukova, Yuliya Rakhmanova, Viktoriya Zyabkina	44.28	
2nd place, silver medalist(s)	3	United States	Ana Holland, Kylie Price, Jade Barber, Nataliyah Friar	44.95	
3rd place, bronze medalist(s)	7	Thailand	Supawan Thipat, Phensri Chairoek, Tassaporn Wannakit, Khanrutai Pakdee	45.03	
4	5	New Zealand	Rochelle Coster, Fiona Morrison, Kelsey Berryman, Mariah Ririnui	45.57	SB
5	2	Slovakia	Lenka Kršáková, Iveta Putalová, Lucia Slaničková, Alexandra Bezeková	46.01	
6	1	China	Qin Wenzhong, Sun Yan, Zhan Qingqing, Lin Huijun	46.11	
7	8	Estonia	Diana Suumann, Karmen Veerme, Maarja Kalev, Kart Viltrop	46.80	
	8	Canada	Marissa Kurtimah, Brittany Crew, Leah Walkeden, Michelle Young	DNF	
