= Yuliya Rakhmanova =

Kazakhstani sprinter (born 1991)

Personal information
- Born: 25 October 1991 (age 34)
- Education: Kazakh Academy of Sport and Tourism
- Height: 1.77 m (5 ft 10 in)
- Weight: 69 kg (152 lb)

Sport
- Sport: Track and field
- Event: 400 metres
Medal record
Women's athletics
Representing Kazakhstan
Asian Indoor Championships
Gold medal – first place	2014 Hangzhou	4×400 m
Silver medal – second place	2014 Hangzhou	400 m

Yuliya Rakhmanova (born 25 October 1991) is a Kazakhstani sprinter specialising in the 400 metres. She has won several medals at continental level.

Her personal bests in the event are 52.61 seconds outdoors (Almaty 2015) and 53.75 seconds indoors (Chimkent 2013).

== Competition record ==
Year	Competition	Venue	Position	Event	Notes
Representing Kazakhstan
2013	Asian Championships	Pune, India	6th	400 m	54.34
2013	Asian Championships	Pune, India	4th	4 × 400 m relay	3:36.09
2014	Asian Indoor Championships	Hangzhou, China	2nd	400 m	54.37
2014	Asian Indoor Championships	Hangzhou, China	1st	4 × 400 m relay	3:42.45
2014	Asian Games	Incheon, South Korea	8th	400 m	54.41
2014	Asian Games	Incheon, South Korea	6th	4 × 400 m relay	3:36.83
2015	Asian Championships	Wuhan, China	4th	400 m	53.66
2015	Asian Championships	Wuhan, China	3rd	4 × 400 m relay	3:35.14
2015	Universiade	Gwangju, South Korea	12th (sf)	400 m	53.40
2015	Universiade	Gwangju, South Korea	1st	4 × 100 m relay	44.28
2016	Olympic Games	Rio de Janeiro, Brazil	–	4 × 100 m relay	DQ
