= Iveta Putalová =

Slovak sprinter (born 1988)

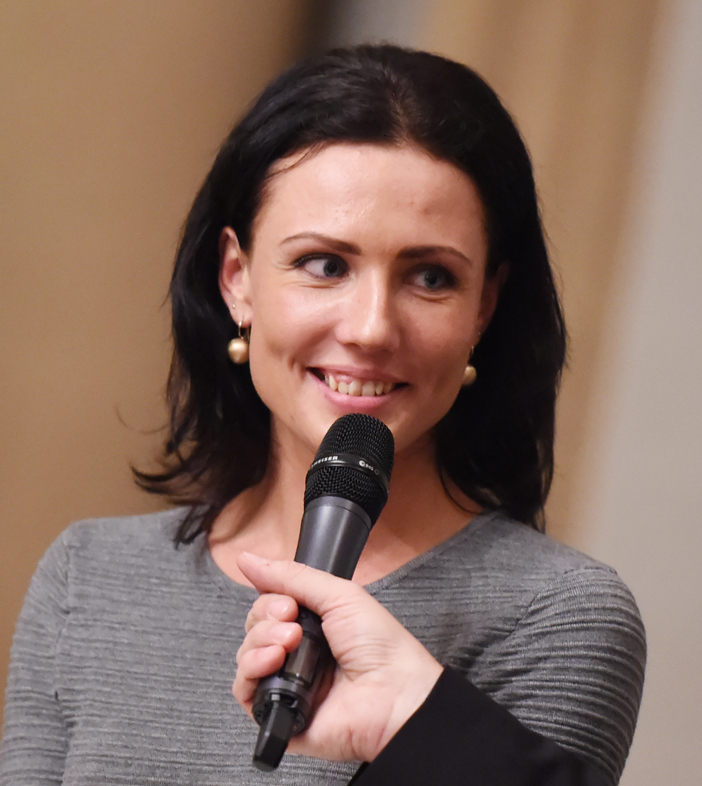
- Iveta Putalová in 2015

Personal information
- Born: 24 March 1988 (age 38) Bratislava, Czechoslovakia
- Height: 1.73 m (5 ft 8 in)
- Weight: 60 kg (132 lb)

Sport
- Sport: Athletics
- Event: 400 m
- Coached by: Marcel Lopuchovský
Medal record
Women's Athletics
Representing Slovakia
European Games
| Gold medal – first place | 2015 Baku | Mixed team |

Iveta Putalová (born 24 March 1988 in Czechoslovakia) is a former Slovak track and field sprinter who was specialised in the 400 metres. She represented her country at the European Athletics Championships in 2014 and the European Athletics Indoor Championships in 2015. Her personal best of 52.84 seconds is the Slovak indoor record for the 400 m.

== Career ==
Her first international podium came at the 2010 European Team Championships, where she was third in the 4×400 metres relay in the Second League of the competition. She then came to prominence individually at the 2014 European Team Championships, taking second place in the 400 m behind Latvia's Gunta Latiševa-Čudare. She is a member of the Sokol Kolín Czech athletics club.

She was the Slovak champion in the 200 metres both indoors and outdoors in 2014. She ran a personal best of 24.12 seconds for the 200 m that same year. She began to make progress in the 400 m, setting a best of 53.25 seconds while running in the heats of the 2014 European Athletics Championships. She was also part of the Slovak relay team at that championships.

Her international breakthrough came at the 2015 European Athletics Indoor Championships where she improved round on round: she began with a Slovak national record of 53.28 seconds in the heats, then 52.99 seconds in the semi-finals and lastly a time of 52.84 to take fourth place in the final.

== Personal bests ==
- 400 metres – 52.18 (2015)
- 400 metres indoor – 52.62 (2018)

== International competitions ==
| Year | Competition | Venue | Position | Event | Notes |
|---|---|---|---|---|---|
| 2010 | European Team Championships (2nd league) | Budapest, Hungary | 3rd | 4 × 400 m relay | |
| 2014 | European Team Championships (2nd league) | Riga, Latvia | 2nd | 400 m | 53.82 |
| 2014 | European Championships | Zürich, Switzerland | 19th (h) | 400 m | 53.25 |
| 2014 | European Championships | Zürich, Switzerland | 14th (h) | 4 × 400 m relay | 3:39.55 |
| 2015 | European Indoor Championships | Prague, Czech Republic | 4th | 400 m | 52.84 NR |
| 2015 | Universiade | Gwangju, South Korea | 5th | 400 m | 52.18 |
| 2015 | Universiade | Gwangju, South Korea | 5th | 4 × 100 m relay | 46.01 |
| 2015 | World Championships | Beijing, China | 36th (h) | 400 m | 52.52 |
| 2016 | World Indoor Championships | Portland, United States | 6th | 400 m | 54.39 |
| 2016 | European Championships | Amsterdam, Netherlands | 23rd (sf) | 400 m | 54.04 |
| 2016 | European Championships | Amsterdam, Netherlands | 10th (h) | 4 × 400 m relay | 3:31.66 |
| 2016 | Olympic Games | Rio de Janeiro, Brazil | 41st (h) | 400 m | 52.82 |
| 2017 | European Indoor Championships | Belgrade, Serbia | 9th (sf) | 400 m | 53.14 |
| 2018 | World Indoor Championships | Birmingham, United Kingdom | 15th (sf) | 400 m | 53.46 |
| 2018 | European Championships | Berlin, Germany | 23rd (h) | 400 m | 53.21 |
| 2018 | European Championships | Berlin, Germany | 8th | 4 × 400 m relay | 3:32.22 |
| 2019 | European Indoor Championships | Glasgow, United Kingdom | 35th (h) | 400 m | 54.19 |
| 2021 | European Indoor Championships | Toruń, Poland | 34th (h) | 400 m | 53.69 |
