= 2023 Asian Athletics Championships – Men's 1500 metres =

Men's 1500 metres at the 2023 Asian Athletics Championships
- Venue: National Stadium
- Location: Bangkok, Thailand
- Dates: 13 July
- Competitors: 19 from 15 nations
- Winning time: 3:42.30

Medalists
gold medal	Ajay Kumar Saroj	India
silver medal	Yusuke Takahashi	Japan
bronze medal	Liu Dezhu	China

The men's 1500 metres event at the 2023 Asian Athletics Championships was held on 13 July.

== Records ==
Records before the 2023 Asian Athletics Championships
Record	Athlete (nation)	Time (s)	Location	Date
World record	Hicham El Guerrouj (MAR)	3:26.00	Rome, Italy	14 July 1998
Asian record	Rashid Ramzi (BHR)	3:29.14	Rome, Italy	14 July 2006
Championship record	Kim Soon-Hyung (KOR)	3:38.60	Manila, Philippines	3 December 1993
World leading	Jakob Ingebrigtsen (NOR)	3:27.95	Oslo, Norway	15 June 2023
Asian leading	Adam Musab Ali (QAT)	3:37.74	Doha, Qatar	1 February 2023

== Results ==
Rank	Name	Nationality	Time	Notes
1st place, gold medalist(s)	Ajay Kumar Saroj	India	3:41.51	
2nd place, silver medalist(s)	Yusuke Takahashi	Japan	3:42.04	
3rd place, bronze medalist(s)	Liu Dezhu	China	3:42.30	
4	Nursultan Keneshbekov	Kyrgyzstan	3:43.25	
5	Mohamed Al-Garni	Qatar	3:43.31	
6	Abdirahman Saeed Hassan	Qatar	3:44.84	
7	Raed Khairallah Al-Jadani	Saudi Arabia	3:45.17	
8	Kazuki Kawamura	Japan	3:45.46	
9	Musulman Dzholomanov	Kyrgyzstan	3:45.70	
10	Lương Đức Phước	Vietnam	3:46.81	
11	Jinson Johnson	India	3:46.91	
12	Hussain Mohsen Al-Farisi	Oman	3:47.12	
13	Mukesh Pal	Nepal	3:53.31	
14	Wahyudi Putra	Indonesia	3:54.35	
15	Tamer Qaoud	Palestine	3:56.93	
16	Dawaanyam Myagmarsuren	Mongolia	3:56.94	
17	Pongsakorn Suksawat	Thailand	3:58.66	PB
18	Hussain Fazeel	Maldives	3:58.77	
19	Abdulla Al-Haswali	Yemen	4:07.02	PB
