= Kazuto Iizawa =

Japanese middle-distance runner

Personal information
- Born: 2 February 2001 (age 25)

Sport
- Sport: Athletics
- Event: Middle-distance running

Achievements and titles
- Personal bests: 1500 m: 3:35.62 (2024); Mile: 3:56.01 (2023); 3000 m: 8:07.06 (2024)
Medal record
Men's athletics
Representing Japan
Asian Games
Gold medal – first place	2026 Aichi–Nagoya	1500 m
Asian Championships
Gold medal – first place	2025 Gumi	1500 m
Asian Indoor Championships
Gold medal – first place	2023 Astana	1500 m

Kazuto Iizawa (born 2 February 2001) is a Japanese middle-distance runner. He won gold medals over 1500 metres at the 2023 Asian Indoor Championships, 2025 Asian Athletics Championships and 2026 Asian Games.

== Biography ==
Iizawa won the Japanese Athletics Championships over 1500 metres for the first time in 2022, in Osaka.

In 2023, he set a new Asian indoor record for the indoor mile run in Boston, Massachusetts, with a time of 3:56.01. He won the gold medal in the 1500 meters at the 2023 Asian Indoor Athletics Championships in Kazakhstan, running 3:42.83.

Iizawa won the Japanese Athletics Championships over 1500 metres for the second time in 2024, in Niigata.

Iizawa won the gold medal in the 1500 meters at the 2025 Asian Athletics Championships in Gumi, South Korea, running 3:42.56. Iizawa won the Japanese Athletics Championships over 1500 metres for the third time in Tokyo in July 2025. In September 2025, he competed at the 2025 World Championships in Tokyo, Japan, without advancing to the semi-finals.

In September 2026, Iizawa won the gold medal in the 1500 metres at the 2026 Asian Games in Aichi-Nagoya, Japan, setting a Games record of 3:36.35. In doing so, he became the first Japanese man in 40 years to win the title at the Games.
