= Abubaker Haydar Abdalla =

Qatari middle-distance runner

Abubaker Haydar
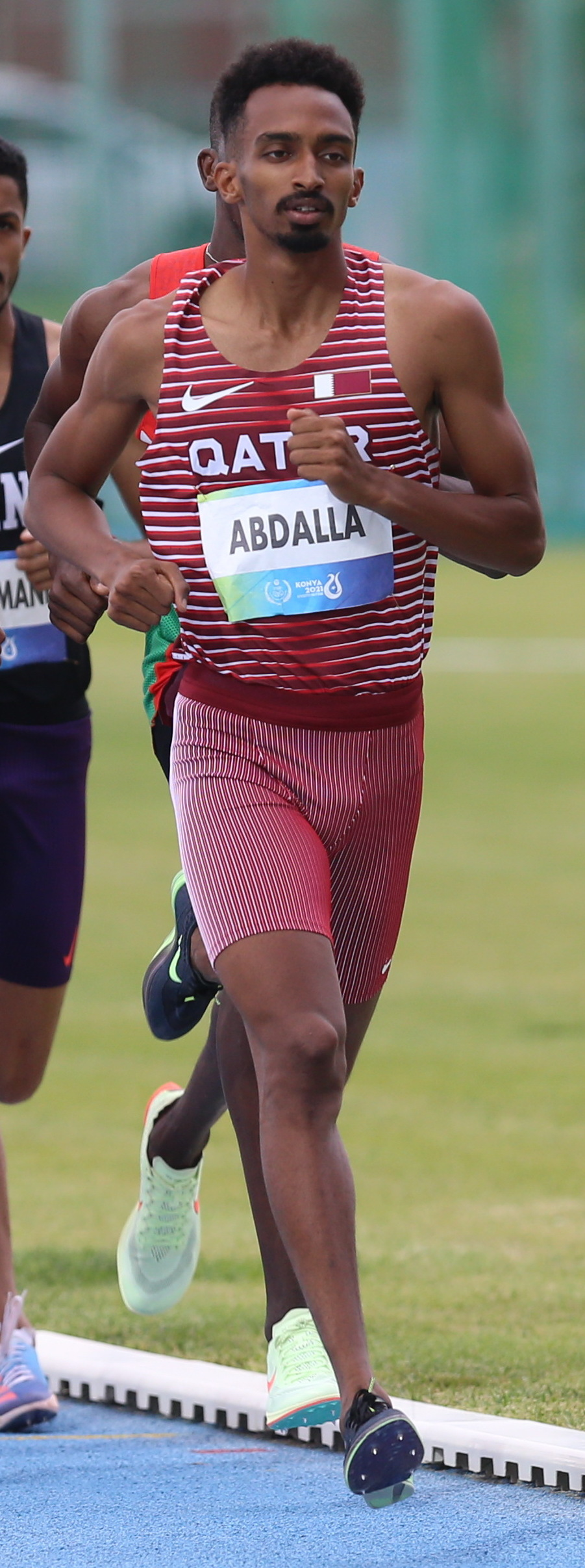
- Abubaker Haydar Abdalla in 2022

Personal information
- Full name: Abubaker Haydar Abdalla
- Born: 28 August 1996 (age 30) Khartoum, Sudan

Sport
- Country: Qatar
- Sport: Men's Athletics
Medal record
Men's athletics
Representing Qatar
Asian Games
Bronze medal – third place	2018 Jakarta–Palembang	800 m
Bronze medal – third place	2026 Aichi–Nagoya	800 m
Asian Championships
Gold medal – first place	2019 Doha	800 m
Gold medal – first place	2023 Bangkok	800 m
Bronze medal – third place	2019 Doha	4 × 400 m
Bronze medal – third place	2023 Bangkok	4 × 400 m
Bronze medal – third place	2025 Gumi	800 m
Islamic Solidarity Games
Gold medal – first place	2021 Konya	800 m
Asian Indoor Championships
Gold medal – first place	2016 Doha	4 × 400 m
Gold medal – first place	2018 Tehran	800 m
Bronze medal – third place	2024 Tehran	800 m
Asian Junior Championships
Silver medal – second place	2014 Taipei	1500 m
Bronze medal – third place	2014 Taipei	4 × 400 m

Abubaker Haydar Abdalla (born 28 August 1996) is a Sudanese-born Qatari middle-distance runner. He competed in the men's 800 metres at the 2016 Summer Olympics.

He has qualified to represent Qatar at the 2020 Summer Olympics.
