= Wu Yuang =

Chinese sprinter (born 1998)

Personal information
- Native name: 吳宇昂
- Nationality: China
- Born: 18 March 1998 (age 28) Xingan County, Ji'an, Jiangxi, China
- Home town: Jiangxi, China

Sport
- Sport: Athletics
- Events: 400 metres, 200 metres

Achievements and titles
- National finals: 2014 Chinese U18s; • 400 m, 3rd (bronze); 2015 Chinese U18s; • 400 m, 1st (gold); • 400 m hurdles, 1st (gold); 2016 Chinese U20s; • 400 m, 1st (gold); 2017 National Games; • 400 m, 3rd (bronze); • 4 × 400 m, 1st (gold); 2021 National Games; • 400 m, 3rd (bronze); 2023 Chinese Indoors; • 400 m, 3rd (bronze)
- Personal bests: 400 m: 45.83 (2017); 200 m: 21.68 (±0.0) (2019)
Medal record
Men's athletics
Representing China
Asian Games
Bronze medal – third place	2018 Jakarta	4 × 400 m mixed
Asian Championships
Silver medal – second place	2019 Doha	4 × 400 m relay

Wu Yuang (Note: In this Chinese name, the family name is Wu.) (Chinese: 吳宇昂; born 18 March 1998), also known as Yu Ang Wu, is a Chinese sprinter. He was the 2017 National Games of China gold medalist in the 4 × 400 metres, and became the Chinese record holder with a time of 3:03.55.

== Biography ==
Wu was raised in the Jiangxi province of China and began competing in 2011. His success at the national U18 level led him to become a medal contender for the 2015 World U18 Championships in Athletics, achieving a 400 m personal best of 47.60 as just a third-grade senior high student. At the 2015 championships in Cali, Wu advanced past the first round of the 400 m where he placed fourth in his semifinal and did not make the finals.

The following year in the 400 m at the World U20 Championships, Wu qualified for the semifinals and ran a faster time, He did not qualify for the finals.

At the 2017 National Games of China, Wu won his first Games gold medal as part of the men's relay. He finished 3rd individually in the 400 m, a feat he would later repeat in 2021.

In 2018 Wu won his first international medal in the mixed 4 × 400 m relay at the 2018 Asian Games, as determined in 2019 when Kemi Adekoya's positive drugs test caused the Bahraini team's disqualification. Wu also competed on the men's relay at the same event, placing 6th.

In 2019, Wu was selected as part of the Chinese team in the men's 4 × 400 m relay at the Asian Athletics Championships. The team placed 2nd to Japan, and their time of 3:03.55 became the Chinese record in that event. In the 2019 World Relays, finishing 8th overall.

== Statistics ==
=== Personal bests ===
Event	Mark	Competition	Venue	Date
400 metres	45.83	National Grand Prix	Taiyuan, China	10 May 2017
200 metres	21.68 (±0.0)	Cerritos Open	Norwalk, California	23 February 2019
