= Mohammed Dwedar =

Palestinian runner (born 2001)

Personal information
- Full name: Mohammed Yahya Suleiman Dwedar
- Nationality: Palestinian
- Born: 9 January 2001 (age 25) Jericho, Palestine
- Home town: Jericho, Palestine
- Education: Al-Quds University
- Height: 1.87 m (6 ft 2 in)

Sport
- Country: Palestine
- Sport: Athletics
- Events: 800 m; 1500 m
- Turned pro: 2023

Achievements and titles
- World finals: 57th (Budapest 2023)
- Updated on 3 August 2024

Mohammed Yahya Suleiman Dwedar (Arabic: محمد يحيى سليمان دويدار; born 9 January 2001) is a Palestinian middle-distance runner specialized in the 800 metres race. He competed at the 2024 Paris Olympics.

== Early and personal life ==
Dwedar was born and raised in Jericho, in the West Bank. He started running in 2012, following his sister, who was already practicing the sport. In September 2016, he travelled to Sassari and Ploaghe in Sardinia, Italy, as part of a project to help Palestinian youth with their sports training, held in collaboration between various associations, the Italian municipalities, the municipality of Jericho and the University of Sassari, and taking place across Sassari, Ploaghe, Alghero, Cagliari and Rome.

As of April 2023, Dwedar was studying at the Faculty of Arts of Al-Quds University.

== Career ==
Dwedar competed for Palestine at the 2021 Summer World University Games in Chengdu, China, and the 2021 Islamic Solidarity Games in Konya, Turkey. He became national champion in 2022.

He made his professional debut at the 2023 Arab Athletics Championships in Marrakesh, Morocco, finishing 11th in his specialty. He went on to take part in the 2023 Arab Games in Oran, Algeria, the 2023 Asian Athletics Championships in Bangkok, Thailand, and the 2023 World Athletics Championships in Budapest, Hungary, as well as in the 2023 Asian Games in Hangzhou, China. He finished 9th in the 800 metres at the 2024 West Asian Athletics Championships in Basra, Iraq, establishing a personal best of 1:52.43, and one of 4:01.46 in the 1500 metres.

Despite failing to pass the qualifications proper, Dwedar was invited to represent Palestine at the 2024 Summer Olympics in Paris, France, again in the 800 metres. The athlete lamented the difficulties posed by movement restrictions in the occupied West Bank, claiming that travelling from one city to another for a competition was made impossible by Israeli raids amid the Gaza war. He travelled to Algeria for a two-month training camp ahead of the Olympics.
