= Li Zicheng (runner) =

Chinese long-distance runner

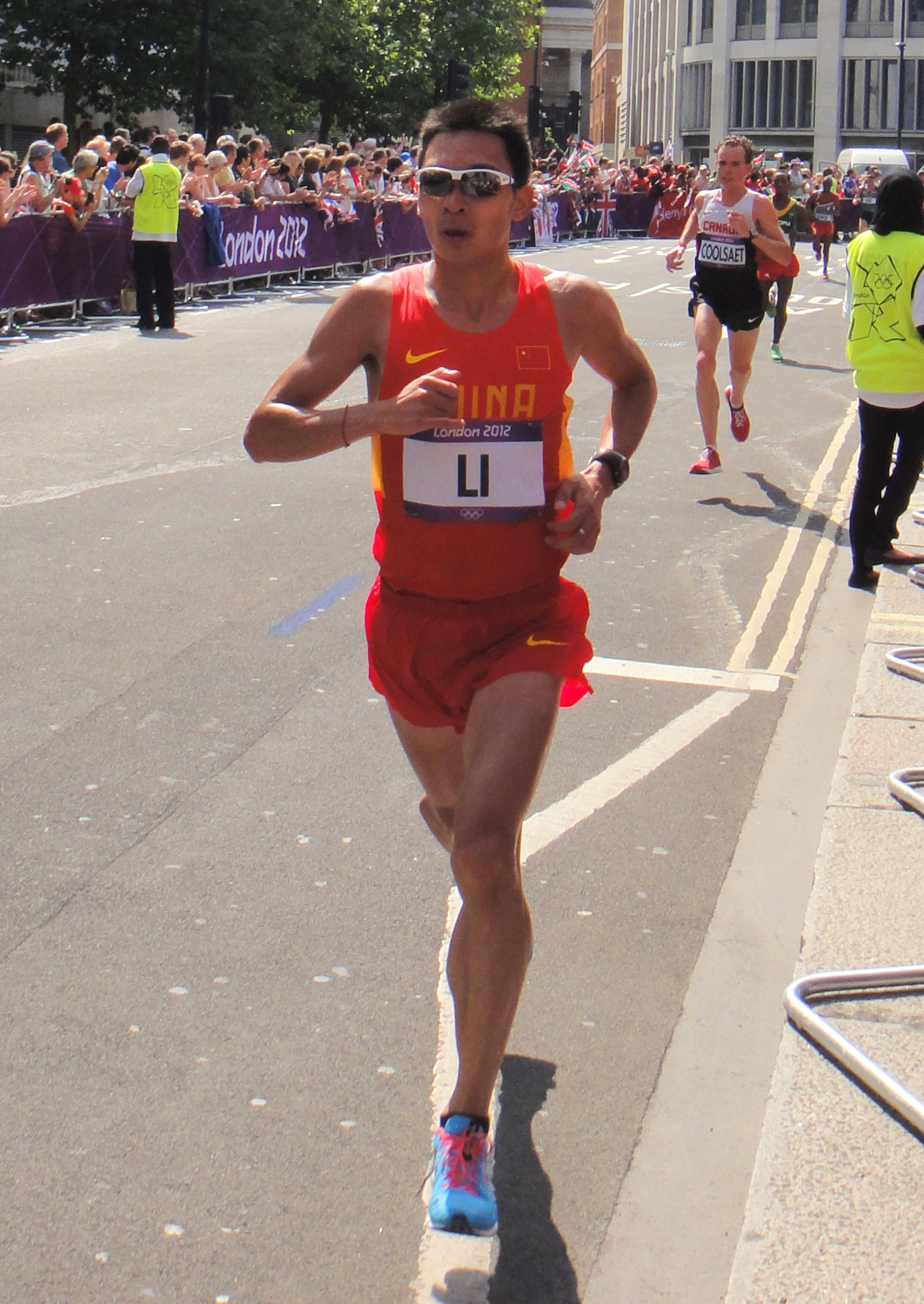
- Zicheng Li in the marathon at the 2012 Summer Olympics in London.

Personal information
- Born: April 10, 1990 (age 35) Binzhou, Shandong, China
- Height: 1.72 m (5 ft 7 1/2 in)
- Weight: 55 kg (121 lb)

Sport
- Country: China
- Sport: Athletics
- Event: Marathon

Li Zicheng (born 10 April 1990) is a Chinese athlete who competed in the marathon at the 2012 Summer Olympics. He did not finish the race.

== See also ==
- China at the 2012 Summer Olympics - Athletics
  - Athletics at the 2012 Summer Olympics – Men's marathon
