= Ruth Spelmeyer =

German sprinter

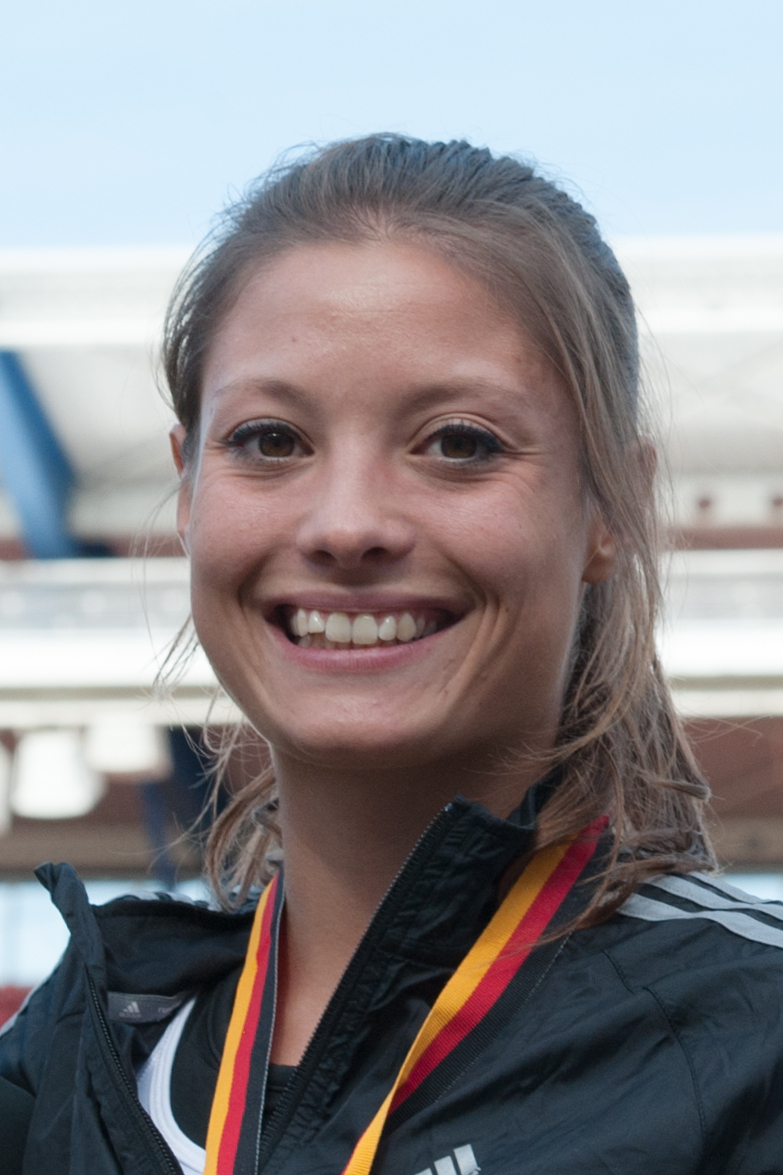
- Ruth Spelmeyer in 2015

Personal information
- Nationality: German
- Born: 19 September 1990 (age 35) Göttingen, West Germany
- Height: 1.73 m (5 ft 8 in)
- Weight: 59 kg (130 lb)

Sport
- Country: Germany
- Sport: Athletics
- Event: 400 metres

Ruth Sophia Spelmeyer (born 19 September 1990) is a German sprinter. She competed in the 4 × 400 metres relay at the 2016 European Athletics Championships. At the 2016 Summer Olympics, she competed in the women's 400 metre event and the women's 4 x 400 metre relay.
