= 2017 National Games of China =

Multi-sport event in China

13th National Games of the People's Republic of China
- Logo of the 2017 National Games of China
- Host city: Tianjin and Luoyang, Henan
- Country: China
- Teams: 38
- Athletes: 10,217
- Events: 341 in 31 sports
- Opening: 27 August 2017
- Closing: 8 September 2017
- Opened by: Xi Jinping; CCP general secretary
- Closed by: Li Keqiang; Chinese premier
- Athlete's Oath: Wei Qiuyue
- Main venue: Tianjin Olympic Center Stadium
- Website: tianjin2017.gov.cn (archived) sport.gov.cn

The 13th National Games of China were held in Tianjin and Luoyang, Henan, from August to September 2017.

== Host bidding ==
In the 13th National Games bidding process, Shaanxi, Tianjin, Zhejiang and Hubei were the candidates. Tianjin was announced as host of 2017 National Games of China.

== Games ==
=== Sports ===
A total of 341 events in 31 sports were held at the games.

- Aquatics
  - Diving (12)
  - Swimming (34)
  - Synchronized swimming (3)
  - Water polo (2)
- Archery (4)
- Athletics (46)
- Badminton (7)
- Baseball (1)
- Basketball (4)
- Boxing (13)
- Canoeing
  - Slalom (4)
  - Sprint (12)
- Cycling
  - BMX (2)
  - Mountain biking (2)
  - Road (4)
  - Track (10)
- Equestrian
  - Dressage (2)
  - Eventing (2)
  - Jumping (2)
- Fencing (12)
- Field hockey (2)
- Football (5)
- Golf (2)
- Gymnastics
  - Artistic (14)
  - Rhythmic (2)
  - Trampoline (4)
- Handball (2)
- Judo (14)
- Modern pentathlon (3)
- Rowing (14)
- Rugby sevens (2)
- Sailing (8)
- Shooting (18)
- Softball (1)
- Table tennis (7)
- Taekwondo (8)
- Tennis (6)
- Triathlon (2)
- Volleyball
  - Volleyball (4)
  - Beach volleyball (2)
- Weightlifting (15)
- Wrestling
  - Freestyle (11)
  - Greco-Roman (6)
- Wushu (12)

== Participation ==
A total of 10,217 athletes from 38 delegations took part in the competition (fewer than both the 2005 and 2009 editions). Among the delegations were 4 municipalities, 22 provincial teams and 5 autonomous regions. Further to this, the People's Liberation Army sent a team, and six sports association teams were entered (generally associations from specific industry groupings or large organisations).

- Anhui
- Beijing
- Chongqing
- Fujian
- Gansu
- Guangdong
- Guangxi
- Guizhou
- Hainan
- Hebei
- Heilongjiang
- Henan
- Hong Kong
- Hubei
- Hunan
- Jiangsu
- Jiangxi
- Jilin
- Liaoning
- Macau
- Inner Mongolia
- Ningxia
- Qinghai
- Shaanxi
- Shandong
- Shanghai
- Shanxi
- Sichuan
- Tianjin
- Tibet
- Xinjiang
- Yunnan
- Zhejiang
- Coal China Sports Association
- Civil Defence and Police Sports Association (前卫体协)
- Locomotive Sports Association
- People's Liberation Army
- Xinjiang Production and Construction Corps

== Aquatics ==
=== Synchronised swimming ===
Event	Gold	Silver	Bronze
Duet (Technical and Free) Routine	Sichuan	Hunan	Guangdong
Team Free Routine	Beijing	Jiangsu	Sichuan
Team overall	Jiangsu	Beijing	Sichuan

== Hockey ==
Event	Gold	Silver	Bronze
Women Ice Hockey	Tianjin	Heilongjiang	Inner Mongolia

== Shooting ==
Event	Gold	Silver	Bronze
Women Skeet	Guangdong	PLA	Wang Xin Yi; Jiangsu
Men Skeet	PLA	Sichuan	PLA
Mixed team	Beijing	PLA	Sichuan
Men Skeet	Shanghai	Shandong	Henan
Women	Shandong	Sichuan	Shanghai

== Tennis ==
Event	Gold	Silver	Bronze
Men team	Jiangsu	Zhejiang	Tianjin
Men team	Jiangsu	Zhejiang	Shanghai
Women team	Tianjin	Zhejiang	Liaoning
Women team	Tianjin	Zhejiang	Sichuan
