= Mohammed Afsal =

Indian athlete

Personal information
- Full name: Mohammed Afsal Pulikkalakath
- Born: 3 February 1996 (age 30) Palappuram, Kerala, India
- Military career
- Branch: Indian Air Force
- Rank: Junior Warrant Officer

Sport
- Sport: Track and field
- Event: 800 metres

Achievements and titles
- Personal bests: 1:44.93 NR (2025)
Medal record
Men's athletics
Representing India
Asian Games
Silver medal – second place	2022 Hangzhou	800m
South Asian Games
Silver medal – second place	2019 Kathmandu	800m

Mohammed Afsal Pulikkalakath (born 3 February 1996) is an Indian track and field athlete who specializes in 800 metres. He rose to prominence after winning the silver medal in the men's 800 m event at the 2022 Asian Games. In 2025, Afsal set the 800 m national record with a time of 1:44.93.

== Personal life ==
Afsal hails from Palappuram, Ottapalam, Palakkad, Kerala. He did his schooling at Parali High School, Parali. He is supported by Reliance Foundation. He works as Junior Warrant Officer in Indian Air Force.

== Career ==
- 2023: He won the silver in the 800m at the 2022 Asian Games.
- 2023: In September, he clocked 47.46sec in 400m at Chandigarh, his personal best in 400m.
- 2023: In May, he did his personal best of wind-assisted 22.73 in 200m at Sportpark Stappegoor, Tilburg. Though it is not a legal mark, it is his best.
- 2023: In May, he did his personal best of 1min, 46.17s in 800m at Putbosstadion, Oordegem, Belgium.
- 2022: In October, he won the gold in 800m at the National Games in Gujarat.
- 2022: In May, as part of an exposure trip to Europe he won a gold in 800m at the Watford Open Graded Meeting.
- 2019: In July, he won the gold in the 800m run at the Qasanov Memorial Meet held at ALMATY, Kazakhstan.
- 2017: In September, he did his personal best of 3:46.48 in 1500m at Chennai.
- 2013: In September, he first came into limelight winning the gold at the first Asian School Track and Field Championships at Kautun, Pahang, Malaysia.
