= Ibrahim Chuot =

Qatari athlete (born 1998)

Personal information
- Full name: Ibrahim Abass M Chuot
- Nationality: Qatari
- Born: 5 July 2004 (age 21)

Sport
- Sport: Athletics
- Event: Middle-distance running

Achievements and titles
- Personal best: 800m: 1:44.08 (2025)
Medal record
Men's athletics
Representing Qatar
Asian Indoor Championships
Gold medal – first place	2026 Tanjijn	800 m

Ibrahim Abass M Chuot (born Dedich Makur Chuot on 5 July 2004) is a Qatari middle-distance runner. He competed over 800 metres at the 2025 World Athletics Championships.

He is the younger brother of Australian rules footballer Akec Makur Chuot and Western Australia parliament member Ayor Makur Chuot.

== Career ==
He finished fifth over 800 metres in May 2025 at the 2025 Doha Diamond League in a personal best 1:44.08. He won the 800 metres in Sondershausen, Germany 1:44.90 in August 2025.

He was selected for the 800 metres at the 2025 World Athletics Championships in Tokyo, Japan, placing fourth in his qualifying heat in 1:45.16 without advancing to the semi-finals.

In February 2026, he won the gold medal in the 800 metres at the 2026 Asian Indoor Athletics Championships in Tianjin, China.
