= Liu Dezhu =

Chinese middle-distance runner (born 2000)

Personal information
- Native name: Chinese: 刘德助
- Nationality: China
- Born: 16 September 2000 (age 25) Baise, Guangxi, China
- Home town: Guangxi, China
- Education: Central China Normal University

Sport
- Sport: Sport of athletics
- Events: 800 metres 1500 metres

Achievements and titles
- National finals: 2017 Chinese U18s; • 800m, 2nd (silver); 2018 Chinese U20s; • 800m, 1st (gold); 2018 Chinese Champs; • 800m, 5th; 2019 Chinese U20s; • 1500m, 1st (gold); • 800m, 1st (gold); 2020 Chinese Champs; • 1500m, 2nd (silver); • 800m, 3rd (bronze); 2021 Chinese Champs; • 1500m, 1st (gold); • 800m, 2nd (silver); 2021 National Games; • 800m, 3rd (bronze); • 1500m, 3rd (bronze); 2023 Chinese Indoors; • 1500m, 2nd (silver); • 800m, 4th
- Personal bests: 800m: 1:45.66 NR (2024) 1500m: 3:38.88 (2023)
Medal record
Men's athletics
Representing China
Chinese National Games
Bronze medal – third place	2021 Shaanxi	800 m
Bronze medal – third place	2021 Shaanxi	1500 m
Asian Championships
Bronze medal – third place	2023 Bangkok	1500 m
Asian Indoor Championships
Bronze medal – third place	2026 Tanjijn	1500 m
- Updated on 13 February 2026

Liu Dezhu (Note: In this Chinese name, the family name is Liu.) (Chinese: 刘德助; born 16 September 2000) is a Chinese middle-distance runner specializing in the 800 metres. In 2024, he set the Chinese short track national record in the 800 m with a time of 1:46.63. He also won a bronze medal in the 1500 m at the 2023 Asian Athletics Championships.

== Career ==
Dezhu first represented China at the 2017 Asian Indoor Games, advancing to the semifinals but not qualifying for the final. After several podium finishes, he would win his first Chinese Athletics Championships title in 2021 in the 1500 metres. At the 2021 National Games of China, Dezhu won bronze medals in the 800 m and 1500 m.

In 2023, Dezhu won a bronze medal in the 1500 m and finished 4th in the 800 m at the 2023 Asian Athletics Championships. He also finished 7th in the World University Games 1500 m that year, as well as finishing 5th and 6th in that year's Asian Games 800 m and 1500 m respectively.

In March 2024, Dezhu set a short track (indoor) Chinese national record in the 800 m, running 1:46.63 at the Chinese Indoor GP Series III in Jinan.

== Personal life ==
Dezhu was born to a poor rural family in Baise, Guangxi, China. He trained as much as 15–20 kilometres (9.3–12.4 mi) per day and in 2016 he was selected for the Guangxi regional athletics team. One year later, he was named to the national team and shortly after began training in Kenya. He studies at Central China Normal University.

== Statistics ==
=== Personal best progression ===
800m progression
#	Mark	Pl.	Competition	Venue	Date	Ref.
1	1:57.31	(gold) (Heat 5-17)	Chinese U18 Championships	Nanchang, China	18 Apr 2017	
2	1:57.25	2nd place, silver medalist(s)	Chinese U18 Championships	Nanchang, China	19 Apr 2017	
3	1:55.04	(silver) (Heat 1)	Asian Indoor Games	Ashgabat, Turkmenistan	17 Sep 2017	
4	1:53.76	4th (Semifinal 1)	Asian Indoor Games	Ashgabat, Turkmenistan	18 Sep 2017	
5	1:53.35	4th (Heat 1)	Chinese Indoor Grand Prix Final	Beijing, China	22 Mar 2018	
6	1:52.76	3rd place, bronze medalist(s)	Chinese Indoor Grand Prix Final	Beijing, China	23 Mar 2018	
7	1:51.62	(silver) (Heat 10)	Chinese Grand Prix, Youth Olympic Games Trials	Zhuzhou, China	16 Apr 2018	
8	1:51.22A	(silver) (Heat 1)	Chinese Grand Prix Final	Guiyang, China	15 Jun 2018	
9	1:50.19	(silver) (Heat 1)	Chinese Athletics Championships	Taiyuan, China	15 Sep 2018	
10	1:49.83	3rd place, bronze medalist(s)	Chinese Grand Prix	Zhaoqing, China	8 Apr 2019	
11	1:49.55	(gold) (Heat 1)	Chinese Indoor GP	Jinan, China	16 Mar 2021	
12	1:49.32	1st place, gold medalist(s)	Yangtze River Delta Elite Meeting	Shaoxing, China	8 Apr 2021	
13	1:48.04	1st place, gold medalist(s)	Division Invitational Tournament - East China	Taizhou, Zhejiang, China	9 May 2021	
14	1:47.36	2nd place, silver medalist(s)	Portland Distance Carnival	Portland, OR	12 May 2023	
15	1:46.77	4th	Asian Athletics Championships	Bangkok, Thailand	15 Jul 2023	
16	1:46.63	(gold) (Heat 4)	Chinese Indoor GP Series III	Jinan, China	11 Mar 2024	
