= Wang Chen (high jumper) =

Chinese high jumper

Personal information
- Born: 27 February 1990 (age 36)

Sport
- Country: China
- Sport: Athletics
- Event: High jump

Achievements and titles
- Personal best: High jump: 2.27 m (2017)

Wang Chen (Chinese: 王臣; pinyin: Wáng Chén; born 27 February 1990) is a Chinese male high jumper, who won an individual gold medal at the 2007 World Youth Championships in Athletics.
