= Yoonus Shah =

Indian athlete (born 2001)

Personal information
- National team: India
- Born: 10 May 2001 (age 25) Pilibhit district,Uttar Pradesh

Sport
- Country: India
- Sport: Athletics
- Event: 1500 m

Yoonus Shah (born 10 May 2001) is an Indian athlete from Uttar Pradesh, who specialises in 1500 metres run. He qualified for the finals of the 1500m run at the 2026 Asian Games in Japan.

== Early life ==
Shah is from Jograjpur village of Pilibhit district, Uttar Pradesh. He works with the Indian Army and his rank is Havildar. His father is a farmer. He has a brother and a sister.

== Career ==
Shah clocked 3 minutes, 45.77 seconds and finished third in his heat to qualify for the final of the 1500 metre event of the 2026 Asian Games along with Gulveer Singh who also finished third in the other heat to qualify for the finals.

In June 2026, Shah clocked 3 minutes, 37.55 seconds in the 1500 metre run to set a meet record at the Inter-State Athletics Championship 2026 at Bhubaneswar beating India's leading runner Gulveer Singh to second. Both of them qualified for the 2026 Asian Games in Japan.

In May 2023, he set a new Games record at the Khelo India University Games in Lucknow clocking 3:51.61 in the 1500 metre run. He represented Mahatma Jyotiba Phule University, Bareilly. In 2022, he won a gold medal at the 82nd All India Inter University athletics meet 2022–23 in the 1500 metres event with a time of 3:45.91. He also won a silver medal in the 800m clocking 1:49.21. In 2024, he won a bronze medal in the Asian Championships in South Korea.
