= Krishan Kumar (athlete) =

Indian middle-distance runner

Medal record

Men's athletics

Representing India

Asian Championships
| Silver medal – second place | 2023 Bangkok | 800 m |

Krishan Kumar (born 12 October 1997) is an Indian athlete. He competes in 800m event. He is named in the Indian athletics team for the 800m event for the 2022 Asian Games at Hangzhou, China. He qualified for the finals and clocked 1:48.50 to finish fifth. He is a three-time National champion and a silver medallist at the Asian Championships.

== Career ==
Krishna Kumar had a busy 2023. In June, he won the gold at the Indian Championships, Kalinga Stadium, Bhubaneshwar, Odisha. Then, in July, he went on to win a silver medal at the Asian Athletics Championships, at Supachalasai National Stadium, Bangkok, Thailand. Earlier in May, he won the gold at the 26th National Federation Cup Senior Athletics Championships, Birsa Munda Foot Ball Stadium, Morabadi, Ranchi.

Before the Asian Games, in August, he took part in the World Championships in Budapest, Hungary and finished 7th in his event 800m run. At Asian Games, he finished fifth in the 800m event finals where his Indian teammate Mohammed Afsal Pulikkalakath won the silver medal.

In September 2021, representing Army, he broke the 800m meet record of Jinson Johnson at the 70th Services Athletics Championships at the Kalinga Stadium, Bhubaneswar.
