= Yang Huizhen =

Chinese sprinter (born 1992)

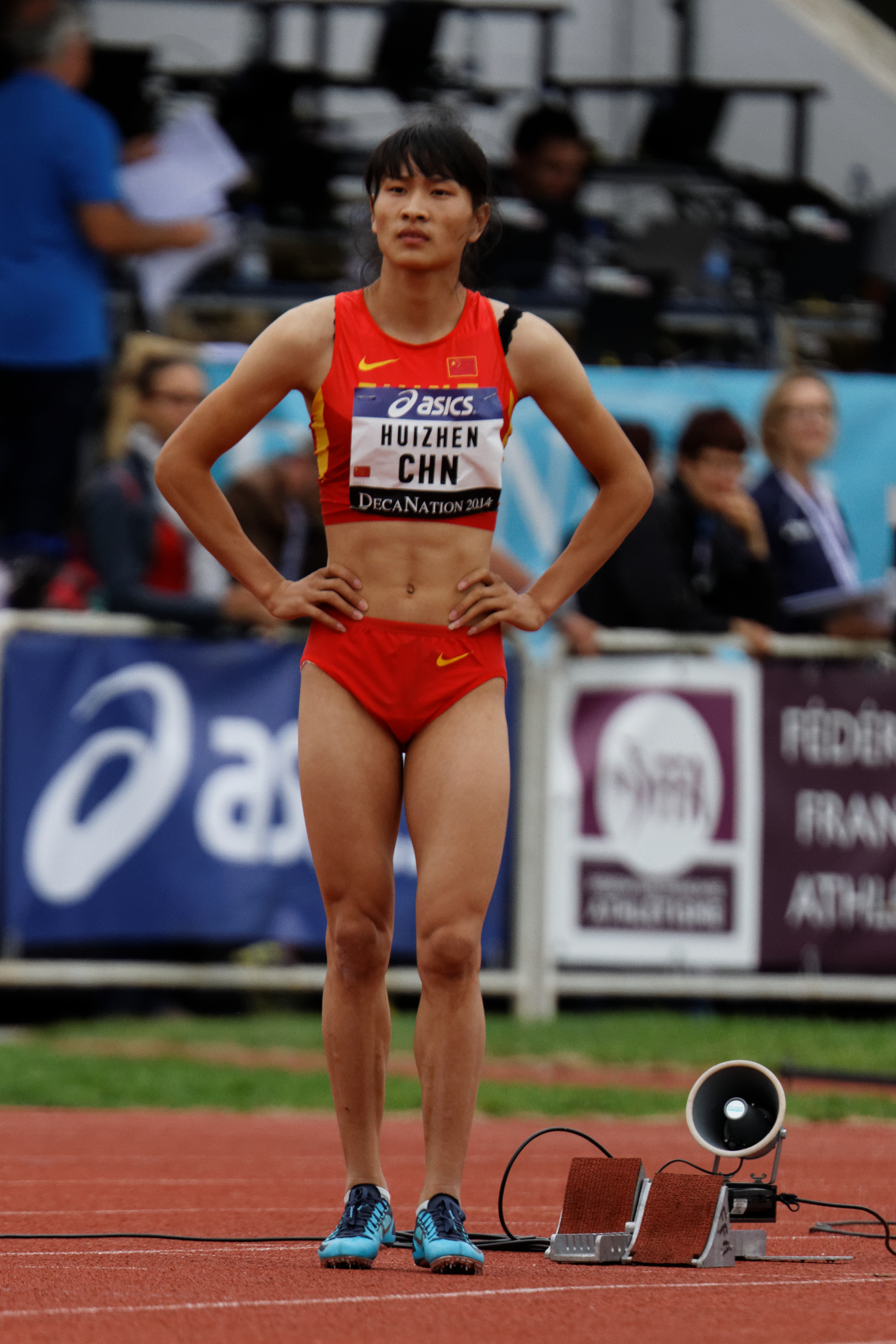
2014 DécaNation - 400 m 14

Yang Huizhen (Chinese: 杨会珍; born 13 August 1992) is a Chinese sprinter specialising in the 400 metres. She won the gold at the 2015 Asian Championships and bronze at the 2015 Summer Universiade.

She studied physical education at the Beijing Sport University.

== Competition record ==
Year	Competition	Venue	Position	Event	Notes
Representing China
2015	Asian Championships	Wuhan, China	1st	400 m	52.37
2015	Asian Championships	Wuhan, China	1st	4 × 400 m relay	3:33.44
2015	Universiade	Gwangju, South Korea	3rd	400 m	51.98
2015	Universiade	Gwangju, South Korea	4th	4 × 400 m relay	3:43.91
2019	World Relays	Yokohama, Japan	4th (B)	4 × 400 m relay	3:31.91

== Personal bests ==
Outdoor

- 200 metres – 24.03 (+0.5 m/s) (Taiyuan 2015)
- 400 metres – 51.98 (Gwangju 2015)
- 800 metres – 2:11.68 (Kunshan 2014)

Indoor

- 200 metres – 24.27 (Beijing 2015)
- 400 metres – 54.23 (Beijing 2014)
