= Chinese Athletics Championships =

Annual track and field competition in China

- Sport: Athletics
- Founded: 1910
- Country: China

The Chinese Athletics Championships (Chinese: 全国田径锦标赛) is an annual track and field competition which serves as the national championship for the People's Republic of China. It is organised by Chinese Athletic Association, China's national governing body for the sport of athletics. The event was first organised in 1910 as a men's only championship and women's championship events were introduced in 1959 – much later than at the Chinese National Games, which had featured women nearly thirty years earlier.

It is the highest level national event for China's track and field athletes, with the exception of the athletics competition at the National Games held every four years. The national competition features the full complement of athletics events that are present on the Olympic programme. The marathon and race walking events are typically held at separate times, but have in the past been incorporated into the main track and field competition. Sometimes men's and women's championships are held discretely. The event typically lasts three to four days and is held near the start of the global outdoor track and field season in June or July, or at the end of that season in September or October.

== Championship records ==
=== Men ===
| Event | Record | Athlete | Date | Place | Ref. |
|---|---|---|---|---|---|
| Triple jump | 17.68 m (+1.0 m/s) AR | Wu Ruiting | 4 August 2025 | Quzhou | |
| Shot put | 20.44 m NR | Xing Jialiang | 4 August 2025 | Quzhou | |
| Hammer throw | | | | | |

=== Women ===
| Event | Record | Athlete | Date | Place | Ref. |
|---|---|---|---|---|---|
| Long jump | 7.01 m (+1.4 m/s) NR | Yao Weili | 5 June 1993 | Jinan | |
| Triple jump | 14.90 m (+1.0 m/s) NR | Xie Limei | 20 September 2007 | Ürümqi | |
| Hammer throw | 78.64 m | Zhang Jiale | 16 August 2026 | Quzhou | |

== See also ==
- 2010 Chinese Athletics Championships
- 2020 Chinese Athletics Championships
