= 2015 Asian Athletics Championships =

2015 Asian Championships
- Dates: 3–7 June
- Host city: Wuhan, China
- Venue: Wuhan Sports Center
- Events: 42
- Participation: 497 athletes from 40 nations

The 21st Asian Athletics Championships was held at the Wuhan Sports Center in Wuhan, China from 3–7 June 2015.

== Results ==
=== Men ===
Event	Gold		Silver		Bronze	
100 metres	Femi Seun Ogunode; Qatar	9.91 AR CR	Zhang Peimeng; China	10.15	Reza Ghasemi; Iran	10.19
200 metres	Femi Seun Ogunode; Qatar	20.32	Fahhad Mohammed Al Subaie; Saudi Arabia	20.63	Dharambir Singh; India	20.66
400 metres	Abdelilah Haroun Hassan; Qatar	44.68	Yousef Ahmed Masrahi; Saudi Arabia	45.14	Kentaro Sato; Japan	46.09
800 metres	Musaeb Abdulrahman Balla; Qatar	1:49.40	Jinson Johnson; India	1:49.69	Sho Kawamoto; Japan	1:50.50
1500 metres	Mohamad Al-Garni; Qatar	3:41.42	Mohammed Tiouali; Bahrain	3:42.43	Belal Mansoor Ali; Bahrain	3:43.67
5000 metres	Mohamad Al-Garni; Qatar	13:34.47 CR	Albert Rop; Bahrain	13:35.26	Lakshmanan Govindan; India	13:36.62
10,000 metres	El Hassan El-Abbassi; Bahrain	28:50.71	Lakshmanan Govindan; India	29:42.81	Andrey Petrov; Uzbekistan	30:20.68
110 metres hurdles	Xie Wenjun; China	13.56	Abdulaziz Al Mandeel; Kuwait	13.67	Kim Byoung-jun; South Korea	13.75
400 metres hurdles	Yuta Konishi; Japan	49.58	Chen Chieh; Chinese Taipei	49.68	Kazuaki Yoshida; Japan	49.95
3000 metres steeplechase	John Kibet Koech; Bahrain	8:27.03	Hashim Salah Mohamed; Qatar	8:36.02	Evans Rutto Chematot; Bahrain	8:42.76
4 × 100 metres relay	China (CHN); Chen Shiwei; Mo Youxue; Su Bingtian; Zhang Peimeng	39.04	Hong Kong (HKG); Tang Yik Chun; So Chun Hong; Ng Ka Fung; Tsui Chi Ho	39.25	Chinese Taipei (TPE); Wang Wen-tang; Yang Chun-han; Lo Yen-yao; Shen Yusen	39.35
4 × 400 metres relay	Qatar (QAT); Femi Seun Ogunode; Musaeb Abdulrahman Balla; Mohamed El Nour Mohamed; Abdelilah Haroun Hassan	3:02.50 CR	Saudi Arabia (KSA); Mazen Al-Yasen; Mohammed Obaid Alsalhi; Abdullah Abkar Mohammed; Yousef Ahmed Masrahi	3:02.62	Japan (JPN); Julian Jrummi Walsh; Yuzo Kanemaru; Kazuma Oseto; Takamasa Kitagawa	3:03.47
High jump	Takashi Eto; Japan	2.24 m	Chun-Hsien Hsiang; Chinese Taipei	2.24 m	Mutaz Essa Barshim; Qatar	2.20 m
Pole vault	Zhang Wei; China	5.60 m	Seito Yamamoto; Japan	5.50m	Huang Bokai; China	5.50m
Long jump	Gao Xinglong; China	7.96 m	Ted Hooper; Chinese Taipei	7.80 m	Tang Gongchen; China	7.79 m
Triple jump	Kim Deok-hyeon; South Korea	16.86 m	Cao Shuo; China	16.77 m	Roman Valiyev; Kazakhstan	16.67 m
Shot put	Inderjeet Singh; India	20.41 m CR	Chang Ming-huang; Chinese Taipei	19.56 m	Tian Zizhong; China	19.45 m
Discus throw	Vikas Gowda; India	62.03 m	Eisa Zankawi; Kuwait	61.57 m	Mahmoud Samimi; Iran	59.78 m
Hammer throw	Dilshod Nazarov; Tajikistan	77.68 m	Ashraf Amgad Elseify; Qatar	76.03 m	Wang Yong; China	73.40 m
Javelin throw	Huang Shih-feng; Chinese Taipei	79.74 m	Bobur Shokirjonov; Uzbekistan	79.09 m	Yukifumi Murakami; Japan	79.05 m
Decathlon	Akihiko Nakamura; Japan	7773 pts	Guo Qi; China	7289 pts	Hu Yufei; China	7042 pts

=== Women ===
Event	Gold		Silver		Bronze	
100 metres	Chisato Fukushima; Japan	11.23w	Viktoriya Zyabkina; Kazakhstan	11.34w	Wei Yongli; China	11.46w
200 metres	Viktoriya Zyabkina; Kazakhstan	23.09	Olga Safronova; Kazakhstan	23.46	Srabani Nanda; India	23.54
400 metres	Yang Huizhen; China	52.37	Machettira Raju Poovamma; India	53.07	Anastassiya Kudinova; Kazakhstan	53.41
800 metres	Tintu Luka; India	2:01.53	Zhao Jing; China	2:03.40	Nimali Liyanarachchi; Sri Lanka	2:03.94
1500 metres	Betlhem Desalegn; United Arab Emirates	4:29.39	Zhao Jing; China	4:29.40	Iino Maya; Japan	4:32.90
5000 metres	Betlhem Desalegn; United Arab Emirates	15:25.15	Alia Saeed Mohammed; United Arab Emirates	15:28.74	Daria Maslova; Kyrgyzstan	15:42.82
10,000 metres	Alia Saeed Mohammed; United Arab Emirates	31:52.29 CR	Eunice Chumba; Bahrain	32:22.29	Michi Numata; Japan	32:44.57
100 metres hurdles	Wu Shuijiao; China	13.12	Anastassiya Pilipenko; Kazakhstan	13.33	Ayako Kimura; Japan	13.41
400 metres hurdles	Kemi Adekoya; Bahrain	54.31 CR	Kira Manami; Japan	57.14	Xiao Xia; China	57.69
3000 metres steeplechase	Lalita Babar; India	9:34.13 CR	Li Zhenzhu; China	9:41.43	Zhang Xinyan; China	9:46.82
4 × 100 metres relay	China (CHN); Tao Yujia; Yuan Qiqi; Lin Huijun; Wei Yongli	43.10 s CR	Japan (JPN); Saori Kitakaze; Anna Doi; Chisato Fukushima; Kana Ichikawa	44.14	Thailand (THA); Supawan Thipat; Khanrutai Pakdee; Phatsorn Jaksuninkorn; Tassaporn Wannakit	44.73
4 × 400 metres relay	China (CHN); Huang Guifen; Cheng Chong; Chen Jingwen; Yang Huizhen	3:33.44	India (IND); Jisna Mathew; Tintu Luka; Debashree Majumder; Machettira Raju Poovamma	3:33.81	Kazakhstan (KAZ); Elina Mikhina; Yuliya Rakhmanova; Alexandra Romanova; Anastassiya Kudinova	3:35.14
High jump	Svetlana Radzivil; Uzbekistan	1.91 m	Yang Wang; China	1.88 m	Zheng Xingjuan; China	1.84 m
Pole vault	Li Ling; China	4.66 m AR CR	Xu Huiqin; China	4.30 m	Tomomi Abiko; Japan	4.20 m
Long jump	Lu Minjia; China	6.52 m	Jung Soon-ok; South Korea	6.47 m	Xu Xiaoling; China	6.46 m
Triple jump	Wang Wupin; China	13.76 m	Li Yanmei; China	13.57 m	Wang Rong; China	13.44 m
Shot put	Guo Tianqian; China	18.59 m	Gao Yang; China	17.98 m	Bian Ka; China	17.78 m
Discus throw	Su Xinyue; China	63.90 m	Tan Jian; China	62.97 m	Lu Xiaoxin; China	62.30 m
Hammer throw	Liu Tingting; China	68.24 m	Na Luo; China	64.97 m	Akane Watanabe; Japan	59.39 m
Javelin throw	Liu Shiying; China	61.33 m CR	Yang Xinli; China	59.24 m	Risa Miyashita; Japan	54.76 m
Heptathlon	Ekaterina Voronina; Uzbekistan	5689 pts	Liksy Joseph; India	5554 pts	Purnima Hembram; India	5511 pts

== Medal table ==
* Host nation (China)

Rank	Nation	Gold	Silver	Bronze	Total
1	China (CHN)*	15	13	13	41
2	Qatar (QAT)	7	2	1	10
3	India (IND)	4	5	4	13
4	Japan (JPN)	4	3	11	18
5	Bahrain (BHR)	3	3	2	8
6	United Arab Emirates (UAE)	3	1	0	4
7	Uzbekistan (UZB)	2	1	1	4
8	Chinese Taipei (TPE)	1	4	1	6
9	Kazakhstan (KAZ)	1	3	3	7
10	South Korea (KOR)	1	1	1	3
11	Tajikistan (TJK)	1	0	0	1
12	Saudi Arabia (KSA)	0	3	0	3
13	Kuwait (KUW)	0	2	0	2
14	Hong Kong (HKG)	0	1	0	1
15	Iran (IRN)	0	0	2	2
16	Kyrgyzstan (KGZ)	0	0	1	1
16	Sri Lanka (SRI)	0	0	1	1
16	Thailand (THA)	0	0	1	1
Totals (18 entries)		42	42	42	126

== Participating nations ==
- Bahrain (12)
- Bangladesh (2)
- Bhutan (1)
- Cambodia (2)
- China (96)
- Chinese Taipei (22)
- Hong Kong (26)
- India (42)
- Indonesia (6)
- Iran (12)
- Iraq (3)
- Japan (58)
- Kazakhstan (19)
- Kuwait (7)
- Kyrgyzstan (7)
- Laos (2)
- Lebanon (3)
- Macau (5)
- Malaysia (10)
- Maldives (7)
- Mongolia (3)
- Nepal (3)
- North Korea (3)
- Oman (7)
- Pakistan (5)
- Palestine (2)
- Philippines (1)
- Qatar (14)
- Saudi Arabia (20)
- Singapore (2)
- South Korea (22)
- Sri Lanka (21)
- Syria (3)
- Tajikistan (5)
- Thailand (13)
- Timor-Leste (2)
- Turkmenistan (4)
- United Arab Emirates (2)
- Uzbekistan (18)
- Vietnam (5)

== See also ==
- 2015 in athletics (track and field)
