= 2021 Japan Championships in Athletics =

105th Japan Championships in Athletics
- Edition: 105th
- Dates: 24-27 June
- Host city: Osaka, Japan
- Venue: Yanmar Stadium Nagai
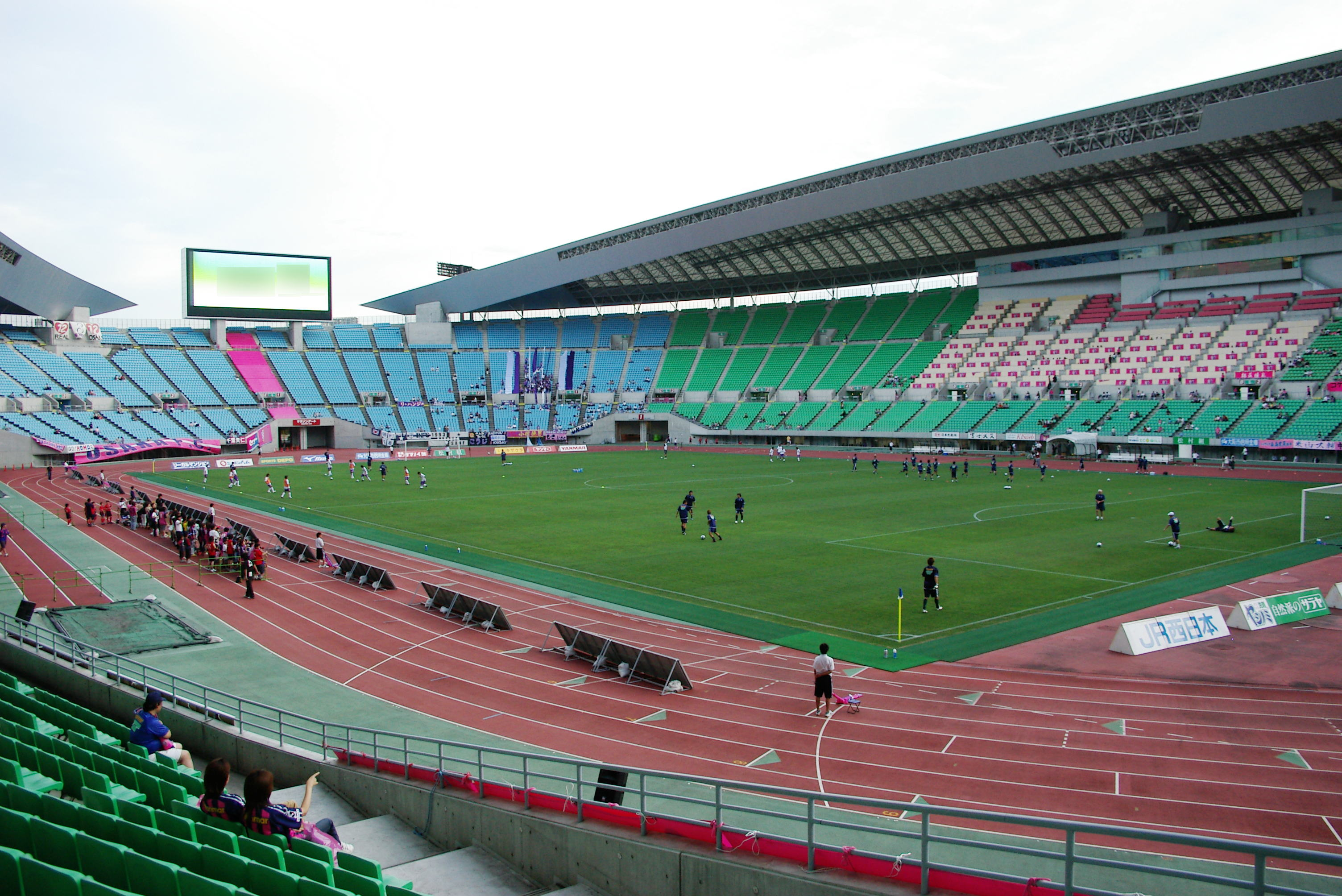
- Level: Senior
- Type: Outdoor

The 105th Japan Championships in Athletics (第105回日本陸上競技選手権大会, Dai 105 kai Nihon Rikujō Kyōgi Sensyuken Taikai) was held at Nagai Stadium in Osaka. Organised by JAAF, the four-day competition took place from 24-27 June and served as the national championships in track and field for the Japan. The competition intended also to serve as the qualifying trial for Japan at the 2020 Summer Olympics.

== Results ==
=== Men ===
Event	Gold		Silver		Bronze	
100 metres	Shuhei Tada; Sumitomo Electric	10.15 s	Bruno Dede; Tokai University	10.19 s	Ryota Yamagata; Seiko	10.27 s
200 metres	Yuki Koike; Sumitomo Electric	20.46 s	Bruno Dede; Tokai University	20.63 s	Ryota Suzuki; Josai University	20.73 s
400 metres	Kaito Kawabata; Mie Kyoin AC	45.75 s	Kentaro Sato; Fujitsu	46.06 s	Aoto Suzuki; Toyo University	46.48 s
800 metres	Kazuyoshi Tamogami; Ami AC	1:46.68 min	Mikuto Kaneko; Chuo University	1:46.86 min	Sho Kawamoto; Suzuki	1:46.89 min
1500 metres	Kazuki Kawamura; Toenec	3:39.18 min	Keisuke Morita; Komori	3:39.59 min	Shoma Funatsu; Kyudenko	3:39.99 min
5000 metres	Hyuga Endo; Sumitomo Electric	13:28.67 min	Hiroki Matsueda; Fujitsu	13:30.21 min	Yuta Bando; Fujitsu	13:31.46 min
10,000 metres	Tatsuhiko Ito; Honda	27:33.38 min	Ren Tazawa; Komazawa University	27:39.21 min	Mebuki Suzuki; Komazawa University	27:41.68 min
110 m hurdles	Shunsuke Izumiya; Juntendo University	13.06 s NR	Taio Kanai; Mizuno Corporation	13.22 s	Shunya Takayama; Zenrin	13.37 s
400 m hurdles	Kazuki Kurokawa; Hosei University	48.69 s	Takatoshi Abe; Yamada Holdings	48.87 s	Takayuki Kishimoto; Fujitsu	49.29 s
3000 m s'chase	Ryuji Miura; Juntendo University	8:15.99 min NR	Kosei Yamaguchi; Aisan Industry	8:19.96 min	Ryoma Aoki; Honda	8:20.70 min
50 km walk	Satoshi Maruo; Aichi Steel	3:38:42 h	Hayato Katsuki; Physical Training School JSDF	3:42:34 h	Kai Kobayashi; Niigata Albirex RC	3:43:31 h
High jump	Naoto Tobe; Japan Airlines	2.30 m	Tomohiro Shinno; Kyudenko	2.27 m	Takashi Eto; Ajinomoto AGF	2.24 m
Pole vault	Kosei Takekawa; Marumoto Sangyo	5.70 m	Masaki Ejima; Tokio Marine & Nichido CS	5.60 m	Takuma Ishikawa; Toyota Seito Yamamoto; Toyota	5.60 m
Long jump	Yuki Hashioka; Fujitsu	8.36 m CR	Hibiki Tsuha; Otsuka Pharmaceutical	7.91 m	Shotaro Shiroyama; Zenrin	7.90 m
Triple jump	Yuki Yamashita; Break Parking	16.12 m	Yuto Adachi; Fukuoka University	16.04 m	Hikaru Ikehata; Surugadai AC	15.96 m
Shot put	Reiji Takeda; Tochigi Sports Association	18.64 m	Masahira Sato; Niigata Albirex RC	18.04 m	Hikaru Murakami; Nihon Taiiku Shisetu	17.90 m
Discus throw	Yuji Tsutsumi; Alsok Gunma	59.29 m	Masateru Yugami; Toyota	57.46 m	Shinichi Yukinaga; Shikoku University	57.35 m
Hammer throw	Shota Fukuda; Nihon University	71.37 m	Ryota Kashimura; Yamada Holdings	69.77 m	Yudai Kimura; Zenrin	68.82 m
Javelin throw	Takuto Kominami; Somay-Q	80.88 m	Genki Dean; Mizuno Corporation	79.94 m	Kenji Ogura; Tochigi Sports Association	78.45 m
Decathlon	Akihiko Nakamura; Suzuki	7833 pts	Keisuke Okuda; Daiichi Gakuin	7768 pts	Tsuyoshi Shimizu; Mie Rikukyo	7661 pts

=== Women ===
Event	Gold		Silver		Bronze	
100 metres	Mei Kodama; Fukuoka University	11.62 s	Aiko Iki; Ritsumeikan University	11.64 s	Chiaki Nagura; NTN Corporation	11.78 s
200 metres	Mei Kodama; Fukuoka University	23.46 s	Remi Tsuruta; MinamiKyushu FamilyMart	23.65 s	Ami Saito; Osaka-Seikei University	23.70 s
400 metres	Mayu Kobayashi; J.VIC	52.86 s	Nanako Matsumoto; Toho Bank	53.35 s	Seika Aoyama; Osaka Seikei AC	53.42 s
800 metres	Ran Urabe; Sekisui Chemical	2:03.71 min	Yuki Hirota; Niigata Albirex RC	2:04.18 min	Nozomi Tanaka; Toyota Industries TC	2:04.47 min
1500 metres	Nozomi Tanaka; Toyota Industries TC	4:08.39 min	Ran Urabe; Sekisui Chemical	4:10.52 min	Ayano Ide; Wacoal	4:13.49 min
5000 metres	Ririka Hironaka; Japan Post	15:05.69 min	Hitomi Niiya; Sekisui Chemical	15:13.73 min	Nozomi Tanaka; Toyota Industries TC	15:18.25 min
10,000 metres	Ririka Hironaka; Japan Post	31:11.75 min	Yuka Ando; Wacoal	31:18.18 min	Narumi Kobayashi; Meijo University	32:08.45 min
100 m hurdles	Asuka Terada; Japan Create	13.09 s	Chisato Kiyoyama; Ichigo Inc.	13.22 s	Miho Suzuki; Hasegawa Sports Facilities	13.35 s
400 m hurdles	Ami Yamamoto; Ritsumeikan University	57.30 s	Eri Utsunomiya; Hasegawa Sports Facilities	57.83 s	Ayesha Ibrahim; Mason Work	58.16 s
3000 m s'chase	Yuno Yamanaka; Ehime Bank	9:41.84 min	Reimi Yoshimura; Daito Bunka University	9:45.52 min	Yui Yabuta; Otsuka Pharmaceutical	9:46.44 min
High jump	Reina Takeyama; International Pacific University	1.78 m	Moe Takeuchi; Tochigi Sports Association	1.78 m	Misaki Okano; Saitama-Sakae-Oberschule	1.73 m
Pole vault	Misaki Morota; Tochigi Sports Association	4.20 m	Mayu Nasu; Kagotani Rena Tanaka; Kagawa University	4.10 m	Not awarded	
Long jump	Sumire Hata; Shibata Industrial	6.40 m	Ayaka Kōra; Tsukuba University	6.30 m	Maya Takeuchi; Team Mizuno Athletic	6.20 m
Triple jump	Mariko Morimoto; Uchida Kensetsu AC	13.37 m	Ayaka Kōra; Tsukuba University	13.03 m	Saki Kenmochi; Hasegawa Sports Facilities	13.02 m
Shot put	Nanaka Kori; Kyushu Kyoritsu University	16.01 m	Fumika Ono; Saitama University	15.64 m	Honoka Oyama; Imamura Hospital	15.18 m
Discus throw	Maki Saito; Tokyo Women's College of Physical Education	52.89 m	Minori Tsujikawa; Uchida Yoko AC	52.05 m	Nanaka Kori; Kyushu Kyoritsu University	50.30 m
Hammer throw	Akane Watanabe; Maruwa	66.24 m	Hitomi Katsuyama; Orico	63.03 m	Raika Murakami; Hirosaki-Jitsugyo-Oberschule	62.25 m
Javelin throw	Haruka Kitaguchi; Japan Airlines	61.49 m	Marina Saito; Suzuki	59.10 m	Sae Takemoto; Osaka University of Health and Sport Sciences	57.95 m
Heptathlon	Yuki Yamasaki; Suzuki	5909 pts	Karin Odama; Nippon Sport Science University	5622 pts	Nonoka Rito; Warabeya Nichiyo	5364 pts
