= 2020 Japan Championships in Athletics =

104th Japan Championships in Athletics
- Edition: 104th
- Dates: 1–3 October
- Host city: Niigata, Japan
- Venue: Denka Big Swan Stadium
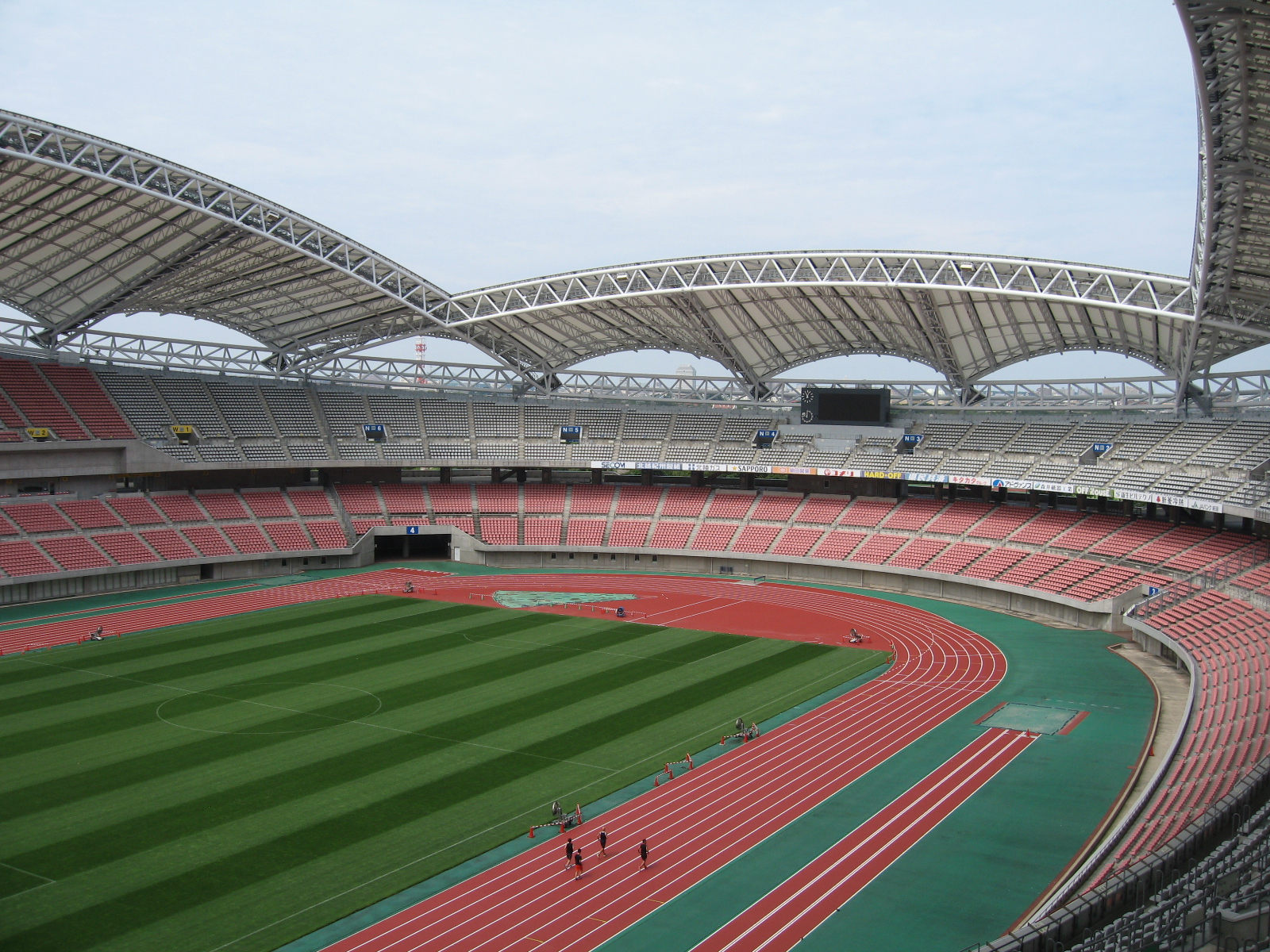
- Level: Senior
- Type: Outdoor

The 104th Japan Championships in Athletics (第104回日本陸上競技選手権大会, Dai 104 kai Nihon Rikujō Kyōgi Sensyuken Taikai) was held at Denka Big Swan Stadium in Niigata. Organised by JAAF, the three-day competition took place from 1–3 October and served as the national championships in track and field for the Japan. The competition originally intended to serve as the qualifying trial for Japan at the 2020 Summer Olympics, but both the national championships and the Olympics were postponed due to the COVID-19 pandemic in Japan. The long-distance competitions were held separately from the main track and field competition, with 3000 metres steeplechase, 5000 metres and 10,000 metres all set to take place on 4 December at the Nagai Stadium.

Beyond the main track and field events, several other national championship events were contested separately that year. The marathon was staged on 8 March at the Lake Biwa Marathon (men) and Nagoya Marathon (women). Combined track and field events were held on 26–27 September at Nagano Athletic Stadium. The team relay championships were held between 16–18 October at the Nissan Stadium in Yokohama. Further events classed under the 104th edition of the national championships were scheduled for 2021, with indoor events on 6–7 February at the Osaka-jō Hall, 20 km walk on 21 February in Kobe and cross country running on 27 February in Fukuoka

== Results ==
=== Men ===
Event	Gold		Silver		Bronze	
100 metres (wind: −0.2 m/s)	Yoshihide Kiryū; Nihon Seimei	10.27 s	Asuka Cambridge; Nike, Inc.	10.28 s	Yuki Koike; Sumitomo Denki	10.30 s
200 metres (wind: −0.5 m/s)	Shōta Iizuka; Mizuno Corporation	20.75 s	Yuki Koike; Sumitomo Denki	20.88 s	Ryōta Suzuki; Josai University	20.89 s
400 metres	Rikuya Ito; Waseda University	45.94 s	Daichi Inoue; Nihon University	46.48 s	Fuga Sato; Nasu Kankyo	46.50 s
800 metres	Daichi Setoguchi; Yamanashi Gakuin University	1:47.70 min	Mikuto Kaneko; Chuo University	1:47.95 min	Junya Matsumoto; Hosei University	1:48.04 min
1500 metres	Ryoji Tatezawa; DeNA	3:41.32 min	Ryota Matono; Mitsubishi Heavy Industries	3:41.82 min	Yasunari Kusu; Ami AC	3:41.89 min
5000 metres	Yuta Bando; Fujitsu	13:18.49 min	Hiroki Matsueda; Fujitsu	13:24.78 min	Yamato Yoshii; Chuo University	13:25.87 min NU20R
10,000 metres	Akira Aizawa; Asahi Kasei	27:18.75 min NR	Tatsuhiko Ito; Honda	27:25.73 min	Kazuki Tamura; Sumitomo Electric Industries	27:28.92 min
Marathon	Naoya Sakuda; JR East	2:08:59 h	Shoma Yamamoto; NTT West	2:09:18 h	Shoya Okuno; Toyota Kyushu	2:09:28 h
110 m hurdles (wind: −0.1 m/s)	Taio Kanai; Mizuno Corporation	13.36 s	Shunya Takayama; Zenrin	13.47 s	Shunsuke Izumiya; Juntendo University	13.48 s
400 m hurdles	Takatoshi Abe; Yamada Corporation	49.73 s	Tatsuhiro Yamamoto; Nihon University	49.79 s	Masaki Toyoda; Fujitsu	49.96 s
3000 m s'chase	Kōsei Yamaguchi; Aisan Industry	8:24.19 min	Yasunari Kusu; Ami AC	8:28.01 min	Ryoma Aoki; Honda	8:30.81 min
4 × 100 m relay	Hosei University; Naruhito Kuwata; Rikuto Higuchi; Takuto Eto; Kazuma Higuchi	39.49 s	Waseda University; Reona Miura; Aoi Inage; Daichi Sawa; Akira Matsumoto	39.69 s	Kindai University; Ryuta Nishizawa; Yuta Kawanishi; Tsubasa Sakai; Koki Kasatani	39.77 s
4 × 400 m relay	Nihon University; Yushi Uike; Kosuke Shoji; Tatsuhiro Yamamoto; Daichi Inoue	3:04.68 min	Waseda University; Tomohiro Kokubo; Rion Kotake; Shunta Fujiyoshi; Rikuya Ito	3:05.00 min	Juntendo University; Kotaro Muratomi; Nenji Yamasaki; Kuraki Kasai; Tomoki Matsuoka	3:06.54 min
20 km walk						
High jump	Tomohiro Shinno; Kyudenko	2.30 m	Naoto Hasegawa; Niigata Albirex RC Ryo Sato; Niigata Albirex RC Takashi Eto; Ajinomoto AGF	2.20 m	Not awarded	
Pole vault	Koki Kuruma; Striders AC	5.60 m	Seito Yamamoto; Toyota	5.60 m	Kosei Takekawa; Marumoto Sangyo	5.50 m
Long jump	Hibiki Tsuha; Ōtsuka Seiyaku	7.99 m	Daiki Oda; Yamada Corporation	7.81 m	Riku Ito; Kinkidai-Kogyo High School	7.75 m
Triple jump	Hikaru Ikehata; Surugadai AC	16.54 m	Yuki Yamashita; Kokushikan Club	16.28 m	Kohei Nakayama; Watanabe Pipe	16.05 m
Shot put	Shinichi Yukinaga; Shikoku University	17.77 m	Hikaru Murakami; Shikoku University	17.73 m	Masahira Sato; Niigata Albirex RC	17.68 m
Discus throw	Yuji Tsutsumi; Alsok	60.24 m	Masateru Yugami; Toyota	56.57 m	Shinichi Yukinaga; Shikoku University	55.89 m
Hammer throw	Ryota Kashimura; Yamada Corporation	71.03 m	Takahiro Kobata; Chukyo University	70.23 m	Shota Fukuda; Nihon University	69.30 m
Javelin throw	Ryohei Arai; Suzuki	81.57 m	Genki Dean; Mizuno Corporation	80.07 m	Tatsuya Sakamoto; Osaka-Taiiku University	78.07 m
Decathlon	Akihiko Nakamura; Suzuki	7739 pts	Keisuke Ushiro; Kokushikan Club	7684 pts	Shun Taue; Juntendo University	7619 pts
Cross country						

=== Women ===
Event	Gold		Silver		Bronze	
100 metres (wind: +0.5 m/s)	Mei Kodama; University of Fukuoka	11.36 s	Remi Tsuruta; MinamiKyushu FamilyMart	11.53 s	Yu Ishikawa; Soyo High School	11.66 s
200 metres (wind: −0.1 m/s)	Remi Tsuruta; MinamiKyushu FamilyMart	23.17 s	Mei Kodama; University of Fukuoka	23.44 s	Sayaka Oishi; Cerespo	23.78 s
400 metres	Seika Aoyama; Osaka Seikei AC	53.55 s	Nanako Matsumoto; Toho Bank	53.77 s	Saki Takashima; Aoyama Gakuin University	53.81 s
800 metres	Ayaka Kawata; Higashiosaka University	2:03.54 min	Ayano Shiomi; Ritsumeikan University	2:04.24 min	Ran Urabe; Sekisui Chemical	2:04.56 min
1500 metres	Nozomi Tanaka; Toyota Industries TC	4:10.21 min	Nanaka Yonezawa; Sendai-Ikuei High School	4:15.62 min	Yume Goto; Toyota Industries TC	4:16.18 min
5000 metres	Nozomi Tanaka; Toyota Industries	15:05.65 min	Ririka Hironaka; Japan Post Holdings	15:07.11 min	Kaede Hagitani; Edion	15:19.41 min
10,000 metres	Hitomi Niiya; Sekisui Chemical	30:20.44 min NR	Mao Ichiyama; Wacoal	31:11.56 min	Sayaka Sato; Sekisui Chemical	31:30.19 min
Marathon	Mao Ichiyama; Wacoal	2:20:29 h	Yuka Ando; Wacoal	2:22:41 h	Sayaka Sato; Sekisui Chemical	2:23:27 h
100 m hurdles (wind: −0.1 m/s)	Masumi Aoki; 77 Bank	13.02 s	Asuka Terada; Pasona Group	13.14 s	Nana Fujimori; Zenrin	13.33 s
400 m hurdles	Ayesha Ibrahim; Sapporo International University	56.50 s	Eri Utsunomiya; Hasegawa Sports Facilities	57.09 s	Akiko Ito; Cerespo	57.34 s
3000 m s'chase	Yukari Ishizawa; Edion	9:48,76 min	Reimi Yoshimura; Daito Bunka University	9:49,45 min	Yui Yabuta; Otsuka Pharmaceutical	9:52,19 min
4 × 100 m relay	Toho Bank; Hitomi Shimura; Konomi Takeishi; Mae Hirosawa; Nanako Matsumoto	45.03 s	University of Fukuoka; Yuki Kido; Mei Kodama; Kirari Watanabe; Shiori Kato	45.26 s	Ritsumeikan University; Mina Nishida; Yumi Tanaka; Ayane Usui; Aiko Iki	45.63 s
4 × 400 m relay	Toho Bank; Konomi Takeishi; Hitomi Shimura; Mae Hirosawa; Nanako Matsumoto	3:35.42 min	Waseda University; Natsumi Murakami; Kana Koyama; Moeka Sekimoto; Rui Tsugawa	3:37.15 min	Aoyama Gakuin University; Hinako Yoshinaka; Ayano Fujii; Ayumi Nakao; Saki Takashima	3:40.55 min
20 km walk						
High jump	Sheriai Tsuda; Tsukiji Gindako AC	1.78 m	Moe Takeuchi; Daito-Bunka University Suzuna Tokumoto; Yuboku	1.75 m	Not awarded	
Pole vault	Mayu Nasu; Run Journey	4.20 m	Misaki Morota; Chuo University	4.00 m	Jun Maekawa; Nippon-Taiiku University	4.00 m
Long jump	Ayaka Kora; University of Tsukuba	6.32 m	Nagisa Yamamoto; Kanoya-Taiiku University	6.25 m	Sumire Hata; Shibata Industrial	6.12 m
Triple jump	Mariko Morimoto; Uchida Kensetsu AC	13.14 m	Asuka Yamamoto; Kokushikan Club	12.85 m	Eri Sakamoto; Nihon Shitsunai TC	12.76 m
Shot put	Yuka Takahashi; Kyushu-Kyoritsu University	15.26 m	Fumika Ono; University of Saitama	15.21 m	Honoka Oyama; University of Fukuoka	15.05 m
Discus throw	Maki Saito; Tokyo-Joshi-Taiiku University	55.41 m	Minori Tsujikawa; Uchida Yoko AC	51.62 m	Natsumi Fujimori; Fukui Sports Association	50.46 m
Hammer throw	Akane Watanabe; Maruwa	64.84 m	Hitomi Katsuyama; Oriko	62.47 m	Miharu Kodate; Ryutsu-Keizai University	60.80 m
Javelin throw	Yuka Sato; Nico-Nico Nori	59.32 m	Haruka Kitaguchi; Japan Airlines	59.30 m	Momone Ueda; University of Fukuoka	58.25 m
Heptathlon	Yuki Yamasaki; Suzuki	5799 pts	Karin Odama; Nippon-Taiiku University	5358 pts	Runa Fujimoto; Kanazawa-Seiryo University	5218 pts
Cross country						
