= 2019 Asian Athletics Championships – Men's 5000 metres =

Men's 5000 metres at the 2019 Asian Athletics Championships
- Venue: Khalifa International Stadium
- Location: Doha, Qatar
- Dates: 24 April
- Competitors: 21 from 14 nations
- Winning time: 13:37.42

Medalists
| gold medal | Birhanu Balew | Bahrain |
| silver medal | Albert Rop | Bahrain |
| bronze medal | Hiroki Matsueda | Japan |

The men's 5000 metres at the 2019 Asian Athletics Championships was held on 24 April.

== Records ==
Records before the 2019 Asian Athletics Championships
| Record | Athlete (nation) | Time (s) | Location | Date |
|---|---|---|---|---|
| World record | Kenenisa Bekele (ETH) | 12:37.35 | Hengelo, Netherlands | 31 May 2004 |
| Asian record | Albert Rop (BHR) | 12:51.96 | Fontvieille, Monaco | 19 July 2013 |
| Championship record | Mohamad Al-Garni (QAT) | 13:34.47 | Wuhan, China | 4 June 2015 |
| World leading | Edward Cheserek (KEN) | 13:08.05 | Boston, United States | 24 February 2019 |
| Asian leading | Hyuga Endo (JPN) | 13:27.81 | Boston, United States | 8 February 2019 |

== Results ==
| Rank | Name | Nationality | Time | Notes |
|---|---|---|---|---|
| 1st place, gold medalist(s) | Birhanu Balew | Bahrain | 13:37.42 | |
| 2nd place, silver medalist(s) | Albert Rop | Bahrain | 13:37.57 | |
| 3rd place, bronze medalist(s) | Hiroki Matsueda | Japan | 13:45.44 | |
| 4 | Hazuma Hattori | Japan | 13:47.82 | |
| 5 | Gavit Murli Kumar | India | 13:48.99 | PB |
| 6 | Abhishek Pal | India | 13:56.09 | SB |
| 7 | Yaser Bagharab | Qatar | 13:56.30 | PB |
| 8 | Hossein Keyhani | Iran | 13:56.86 | PB |
| 9 | Jalil Nasseri | Iran | 14:19.82 | SB |
| 10 | Nguyễn Văn Lai | Vietnam | 14:26.81 | SB |
| 11 | Du Jianrong | China | 14:28.56 | SB |
| 12 | Gawa Zangpo | Bhutan | 14:33.43 | NR |
| 13 | Ajitkumar Yadav | Nepal | 14:37.13 | SB |
| 14 | Suber Hassan Jama | Qatar | 14:39.58 | |
| 15 | Yan Wei | China | 14:40.94 | |
| 16 | Mahmoud Esbitan | Palestine | 15:03.49 | SB |
| 17 | Daniaar Arypbekov | Kyrgyzstan | 15:17.57 | SB |
| 18 | Hussain Fazeel Haroon | Maldives | 15:30.27 | NR |
| 19 | Nabin Parajuli | Singapore | 15:35.51 | PB |
| 20 | Pheara Vann | Cambodia | 16:30.50 | PB |
| 21 | Abdelrahim Al-Abiat | Palestine | 17:01.16 | SB |
| | Osama Al-Yaari | Yemen | DNS | |
