= Athletics at the 2022 Asian Games – Men's 3000 metres steeplechase =

Men's 3000 metres steeplechase at the 2022 Asian Games
- Venue: Hangzhou Olympic Expo Main Stadium
- Date: 1 October 2023
- Competitors: 13 from 10 nations

Medalists
gold medal	Avinash Sable	India
silver medal	Ryoma Aoki	Japan
bronze medal	Seiya Sunada	Japan

The men's 3000 metres steeplechase competition at the 2022 Asian Games took place on 1 October 2023 at the HOC Stadium, Hangzhou.

== Schedule ==
All times are China Standard Time (UTC+08:00)

Date	Time	Event
Sunday, 1 October 2023	19:15	Final

== Records ==
Prior to this competition, the existing world, Asian and Games records were as follows.

World Record	Saif Saaeed Shaheen (QAT)	7:53.63	Brussels, Belgium	3 September 2004
Asian Record	Saif Saaeed Shaheen (QAT)	7:53.63	Brussels, Belgium	3 September 2004
Games Record	Hossein Keyhani (IRI)	8:22.79	Jakarta, Indonesia	27 August 2018

== Results ==
Legend

- DSQ — Disqualified

Rank	Athlete	Time	Notes
1st place, gold medalist(s)	Avinash Sable (IND)	8:19.50	GR
2nd place, silver medalist(s)	Ryoma Aoki (JPN)	8:23.75	
3rd place, bronze medalist(s)	Seiya Sunada (JPN)	8:26.47	
4	Musab Adam Ali (QAT)	8:32.57	
5	Yaser Bagharab (QAT)	8:34.14	
6	Zhaxi Ciren (CHN)	8:36.57	
7	Hossein Keyhani (IRI)	8:45.98	
8	Bader Al-Amrani (KSA)	8:49.14	
9	Pandu Sukarya (INA)	8:54.34	
10	John Kibet Koech (BRN)	9:03.75	
11	Park Won-been (KOR)	9:07.21	
—	Nguyễn Trung Cường (VIE)	DSQ	
DQ	Wesam Al-Farsi (KSA)	~~9:09.27~~	

- Wesam Al-Farsi of Saudi Arabia originally finished 12th, but got disqualified after he tested positive for Darbepoetin.
