= 2023 Asian Athletics Championships – Men's 3000 metres steeplechase =

Men's 3000 metres steeplechase at the 2023 Asian Athletics Championships
- Venue: National Stadium
- Location: Bangkok, Thailand
- Dates: 14 July
- Competitors: 13 from 8 nations
- Winning time: 8:34.91

Medalists
gold medal	Ryoma Aoki	Japan
silver medal	Yaser Salem Bagharab	Qatar
bronze medal	Seiya Sunada	Japan

The men's 3000 metres steeplechase event at the 2023 Asian Athletics Championships was held on 14 July.

== Records ==
Records before the 2023 Asian Athletics Championships
Record	Athlete (nation)	Time (s)	Location	Date
World record	Lamecha Girma (ETH)	7:52.11	Paris, France	9 June 2023
Asian record	Saif Saaeed Shaheen (QAT)	7:53.63	Brussels, Belgium	3 September 2004
Championship record	Khamis Abdullah Saifeldin (QAT)	8:16.00	Colombo, Sri Lanka	10 August 2002
World leading	Lamecha Girma (ETH)	7:52.11	Paris, France	9 June 2023
Asian leading	Ryuji Miura (JPN)	8:09.91	Paris, France	9 June 2023

== Results ==
Rank	Name	Nationality	Time	Notes
1st place, gold medalist(s)	Ryoma Aoki	Japan	8:34.91	
2nd place, silver medalist(s)	Yaser Salem Bagharab	Qatar	8:37.11	
3rd place, bronze medalist(s)	Seiya Sunada	Japan	8:39.17	
4	Bal Kishan	India	8:46.98	PB
5	Adam Ali Musab	Qatar	8:53.71	
6	Wesam Al-Farsi	Saudi Arabia	9:02.68	
7	Za Xiciren	China	9:06.25	
8	Pandu Sukarya	Indonesia	9:10.49	
9	Tanes Somduan	Thailand	9:50.10	NU20R
10	Pongsurachat Wongchai	Thailand	10:20.76	PB
	Bader Ali Al-Amrani	Saudi Arabia	DNF	
	Mohd Noor Hasan	India	DNF	
	Nguyễn Trung Cường	Vietnam	DNF	
