= 2023 Asian Athletics Championships – Men's 5000 metres =

Men's 5000 metres at the 2023 Asian Athletics Championships
- Venue: National Stadium
- Location: Bangkok, Thailand
- Dates: 16 July
- Competitors: 21 from 15 nations
- Winning time: 13:34.94

Medalists
gold medal	Hyuga Endo	Japan
silver medal	Kazuya Shiojiri	Japan
bronze medal	Gulveer Singh	India

The men's 5000 metres event at the 2023 Asian Athletics Championships was held on 16 July.

== Records ==
Records before the 2023 Asian Athletics Championships
Record	Athlete (nation)	Time (s)	Location	Date
World record	Joshua Cheptegei (UGA)	12:35.36	Fontvieille, Monaco	14 August 2020
Asian record	Albert Rop (BHR)	12:51.96	Fontvieille, Monaco	19 July 2013
Championship record	Mohamad Al-Garni (QAT)	13:34.47	Wuhan, China	4 June 2015
World leading	Berihu Aregawi (ETH)	12:40.45	Lausanne, Switzerland	30 June 2023
Asian leading	Birhanu Balew (BHR)	13:01.41	Lausanne, Switzerland	30 June 2023

== Results ==
Rank	Name	Nationality	Time	Notes
1st place, gold medalist(s)	Hyuga Endo	Japan	13:34.94	
2nd place, silver medalist(s)	Kazuya Shiojiri	Japan	13:43.92	
3rd place, bronze medalist(s)	Gulveer Singh	India	13:48.33	
4	Shokhrukh Davlyatov	Uzbekistan	13:57.76	PB
5	Mohamed Al-Garni	Qatar	14:16.48	
6	Yaser Salem Bagharab	Qatar	14:22.23	
7	Nursultan Keneshbekov	Kyrgyzstan	14:23.25	
8	Shadrack Kimutai	Kazakhstan	14:24.86	
9	Youssef Asiri	Saudi Arabia	14:30.02	
10	Gantulga Dambadarjaa	Mongolia	14:32.86	PB
11	Mukesh Pal	Nepal	14:33.50	PB
12	Robi Syianturi	Indonesia	14:33.51	
13	Zhaxi Ciren	China	14:58.54	
14	Abhishek Pal	India	15:00.03	
15	Sonny Wagdos	Philippines	15:31.57	
16	Pongsakorn Suksawat	Philippines	15:37.39	PB
17	Tse Chun Yin	Hong Kong	15:49.42	PB
18	Soe Than Htike	Myanmar	17:35.66	PB
	Nguyễn Trung Cường	Vietnam	DNS	
	Tariq Ahmed Al-Amri	Saudi Arabia	DNS	
	Chen Tianyu	China	DNS	
