= 2017 Asian Athletics Championships – Men's 3000 metres steeplechase =

The men's 3000 metres steeplechase at the 2017 Asian Athletics Championships was held on 8 July.

== Results ==
Rank	Name	Nationality	Time	Notes
1st place, gold medalist(s)	Hossein Keyhani	Iran	8:43.82	
2nd place, silver medalist(s)	Yaser Salem Bagharab	Qatar	8:46.16	
3rd place, bronze medalist(s)	Ali Ahmad Al-Amri	Saudi Arabia	8:52.64	
4	Hashim Mohamed Salah	Qatar	8:55.94	
5	Kosei Yamaguchi	Japan	8:58.58	
6	Mosfata Videligani	Iran	9:02.59	
7	Naveen Kumar	India	9:02.95	
8	Durga Bahadur Budha	India	9:04.05	
9	Deus Felisberto	Timor-Leste	9:48.10	
10	Yu Hin Wa	Hong Kong	9:52.59	
11	Khalid Al-Badwawi	United Arab Emirates	9:53.65	
12	Shine	Myanmar	10:15.54	

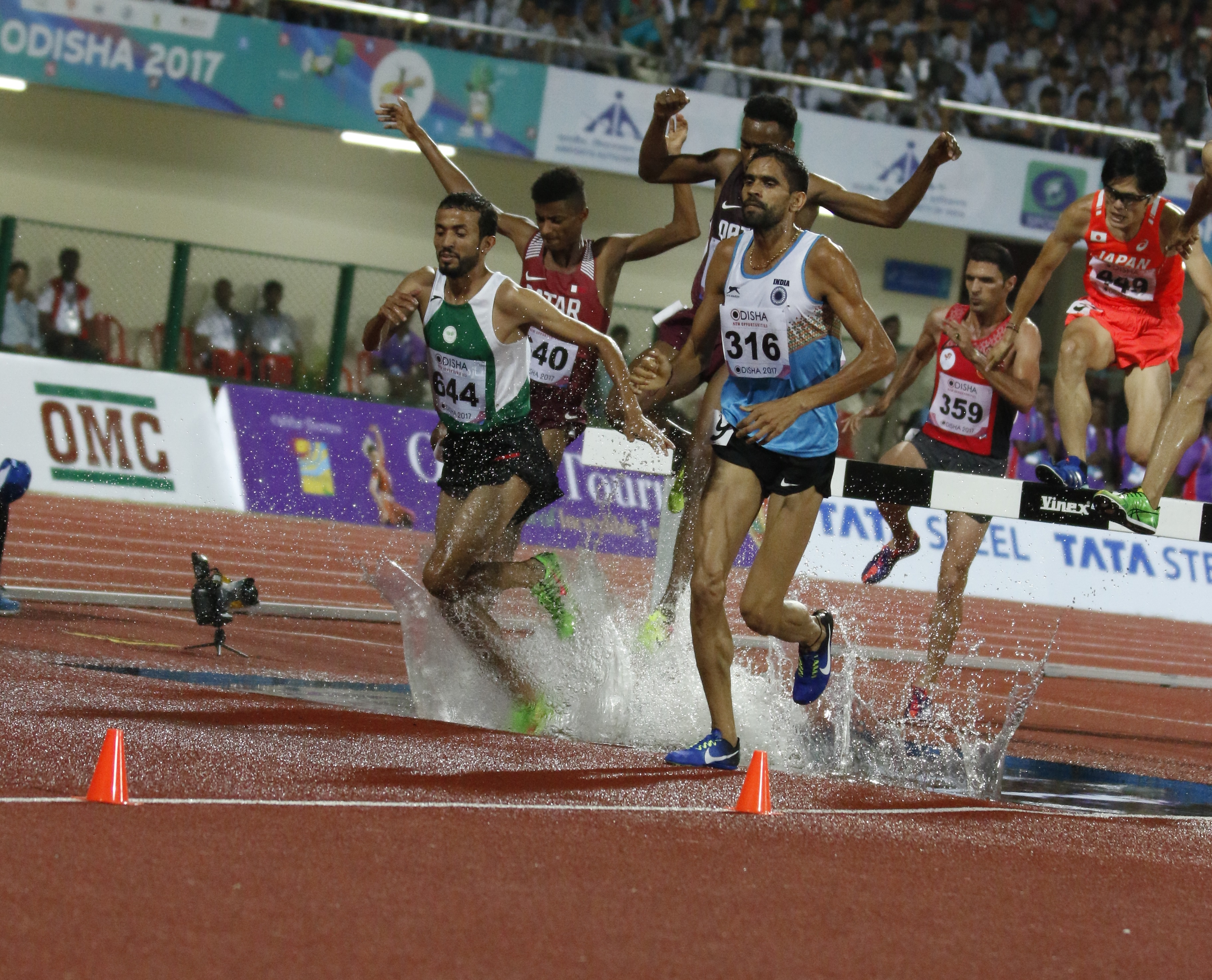
The race underway
