= 2025 Asian Athletics Championships – Men's 3000 metres steeplechase =

Men's 3000 metres steeplechase at the 2025 Asian Athletics Championships
- Venue: Gumi Civic Stadium
- Location: Gumi, South Korea
- Dates: 29 May
- Competitors: 12 from 9 nations
- Winning time: 8:20.92

Medalists
gold medal	Avinash Sable	India
silver medal	Yutaro Niinae	Japan
bronze medal	Zakaria al Alhlami	Qatar

The men's 3000 metres steeplechase event at the 2025 Asian Athletics Championships was held on 29 May.

== Records ==
Records before the 2025 Asian Athletics Championships
Record	Athlete (nation)	Time (s)	Location	Date
World record	Lamecha Girma (ETH)	7:52.11	Paris, France	9 June 2023
Asian record	Saif Saaeed Shaheen (QAT)	7:53.63	Brussels, Belgium	3 September 2004
Championship record	Khamis Abdullah Saifeldin (QAT)	8:16.00	Colombo, Sri Lanka	10 August 2002
World leading	Soufiane El Bakkali (MAR)	8:00.70	Rabat, Morocco	25 May 2025
Asian leading	Ryuji Miura (JPN)	8:10.11	Xiamen, China	26 April 2025

== Schedule ==
The event schedule, in local time (UTC+9), was as follows:

Date	Time	Round
29 May	21:37	Final

== Results ==
Place	Athlete	Nation	Time	Notes
1st place, gold medalist(s)	Avinash Sable	India	8:20.92	SB
2nd place, silver medalist(s)	Yutaro Niinae	Japan	8:24.41	SB
3rd place, bronze medalist(s)	Zakaria Al-Alhlami	Qatar	8:27.12	PB
4	Tetsu Sasaki	Japan	8:30.97	
5	Nguyễn Trung Cường	Vietnam	8:38.25	PB
6	Park Won-been	South Korea	8:46.91	SB
7	Pandu Sukarya	Indonesia	9:02.11	SB
8	Lee Seung-ho	South Korea	9:28.34	
9	Park Jae-young	South Korea	9:31.71	
10	Aleksandr Salakhudinov	Kyrgyzstan	9:47.93	
11	Leong Chin Hei	Macau	10:10.53	
—	Seyed Amir Zamanpour	Iran	DNF	
