= Athletics at the 2026 Asian Games – Men's 3000 metres steeplechase =

Men's 3000 metres steeplechase at the 2026 Asian Games
- Venue: Mizuho Park Athletic Stadium, Nagoya
- Date: 28 September 2026
- Competitors: 7 from 6 nations
- Winning time: 8:17.36

Medalists
gold medal	Ryuji Miura	Japan
silver medal	Ryoma Aoki	Japan
bronze medal	Zakaria El-Ahlaami	Qatar

The men's 3000 metres steeplechase competition at the 2026 Asian Games took place on 28 September 2026 at the Mizuho Park Athletic Stadium in Nagoya, Japan. Ryuji Miura of Japan won the gold medal, Ryoma Aoki of Japan won the silver and Zakaria El-Ahlaami of Qatar won the bronze. Miura set a new Games Record of 8:17.36. The previous record holder, Avinash Sable of India, finished fourth in the event.

== Schedule ==
All times are Japan Standard Time (UTC+09:00)

Schedule
Date	Time	Event
28 September 2026	16:17	Final

== Records ==
Prior to this competition, the existing world, Asian and Games records were as follows.

World Record	Lamecha Girma (ETH)	7:52.11	Paris, France	5 September 2023
Asian Record	Saif Saaeed Shaheen (QAT)	7:53.63	Brussels, Belgium	2 September 2004
Games Record	Avinash Sable (IND)	8:19.50	Hangzhou, China	30 September 2023

== Results ==
Place	Athlete	Nation	Time	Notes
1st place, gold medalist(s)	Ryuji Miura	Japan	8:17.36	GR
2nd place, silver medalist(s)	Ryoma Aoki	Japan	8:17.60	
3rd place, bronze medalist(s)	Zakaria El-Ahlaami	Qatar	8:18.13	PB
4	Avinash Sable	India	8:21.67	SB
5	Park Won-been	South Korea	8:48.30	
6	Nguyễn Trung Cường	Vietnam	8:57.71	
7	Pandu Sukarya	Indonesia	9:18.89	SB
