= 2019 Asian Athletics Championships – Men's 3000 metres steeplechase =

Men's 3000 metres steeplechase at the 2019 Asian Athletics Championships
- Venue: Khalifa International Stadium
- Location: Doha, Qatar
- Dates: 21 April
- Competitors: 15 from 10 nations
- Winning time: 8:25.87

Medalists
gold medal	John Kibet Koech	Bahrain
silver medal	Avinash Mukund Sable	India
bronze medal	Kazuya Shiojiri	Japan

The men's 3000 metres steeplechase at the 2019 Asian Athletics Championships was held on 21 April.

== Records ==
Records before the 2019 Asian Athletics Championships
Record	Athlete (nation)	Time (s)	Location	Date
World record	Saif Saaeed Shaheen (QAT)	7:53.63	Brussels, Belgium	3 September 2004
Asian record	Saif Saaeed Shaheen (QAT)	7:53.63	Brussels, Belgium	3 September 2004
Championship record	Khamis Abdullah Saifeldin (QAT)	8:16.00	Colombo, Sri Lanka	10 August 2002
World leading	Leonard Bett (KEN)	8:25.60	Abidjan, Ivory Coast	20 April 2019
Asian leading	Avinash Sable (IND)	8:28.94	Patiala, India	18 March 2019

== Results ==
Rank	Name	Nationality	Time	Notes
1st place, gold medalist(s)	John Kibet Koech	Bahrain	8:25.87	WL
2nd place, silver medalist(s)	Avinash Mukund Sable	India	8:30.19	
3rd place, bronze medalist(s)	Kazuya Shiojiri	Japan	8:32.25	
4	Hossein Keyhani	Iran	8:36.44	SB
5	Yaser Bagharab	Qatar	8:45.80	SB
6	Kosei Yamaguchi	Japan	8:47.07	
7	Tu Wenji	China	8:47.37	PB
8	Shakar Lal Swami	India	8:53.02	
9	Moslem Niadoost	Iran	8:58.95	PB
10	Idriss Mousa Youssouf	Qatar	9:00.71	SB
11	Zhang Mingzhou	China	9:17.88	SB
12	Chow Hon Nip Hanniel	Hong Kong	9:28.34	
13	Daniaar Arypbekov	Kyrgyzstan	9:33.63	SB
14	Nabin Parajuli	Singapore	9:38.37	
	Mubarak Al-Yafaee	Yemen	DNF	
	Atjong Tio Purwanto	Indonesia	DNS	
