= Hossein Keyhani =

Iranian runner

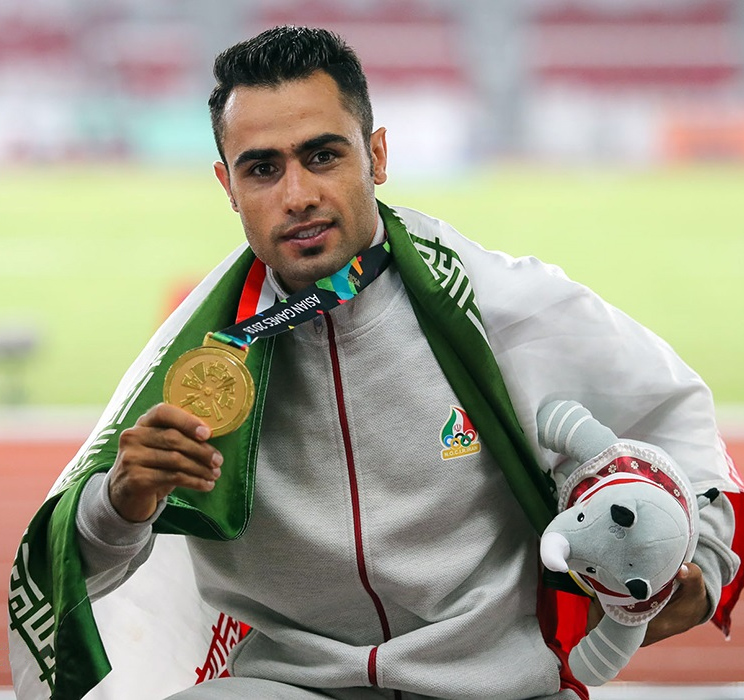
- Keyhani at the 2018 Asian Games

Personal information
- Born: 26 April 1990 (age 36) Songhor, Kermanshah Province, Iran
- Height: 175 cm (5 ft 9 in)
- Weight: 63 kg (139 lb)

Sport
- Sport: Athletics
- Event(s): 400–5000 m, 3000 m steeplechase

Achievements and titles
- Personal bests: 800 m – 1:51.79 (2017); 1500 m – 3:45.33 (2018); 3000 m – 8:07:09 (2017); 5000 m – 13:56 (2019); 3000 mSC – 8:22.79 (2018) NR
Medal record
Men's athletics
Representing Iran
Asian Indoor Championships
Gold medal – first place	2018 Tehran	3000 m

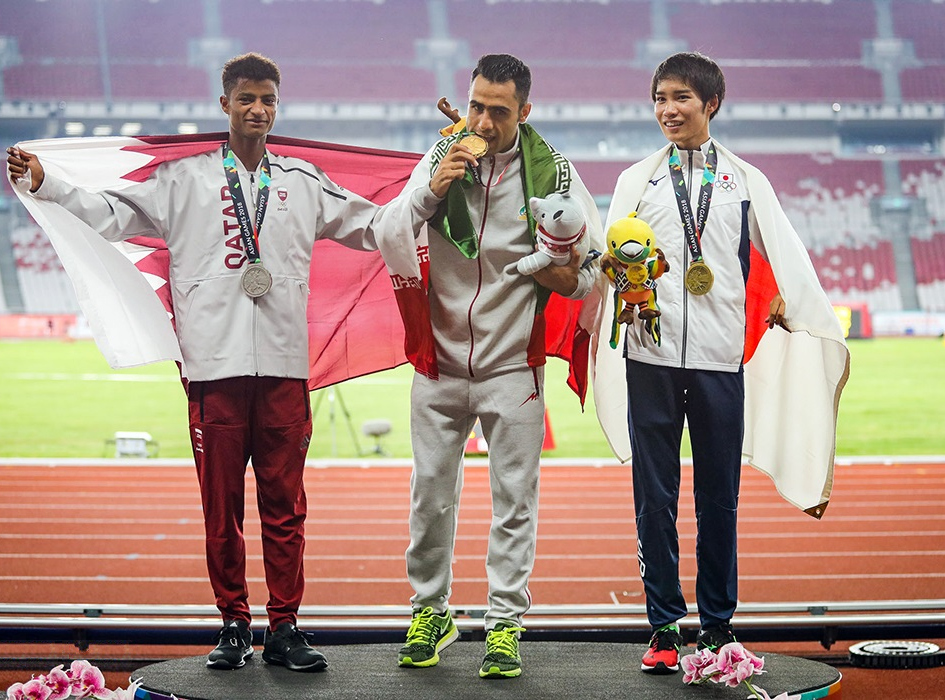
2018 Asian Games podium

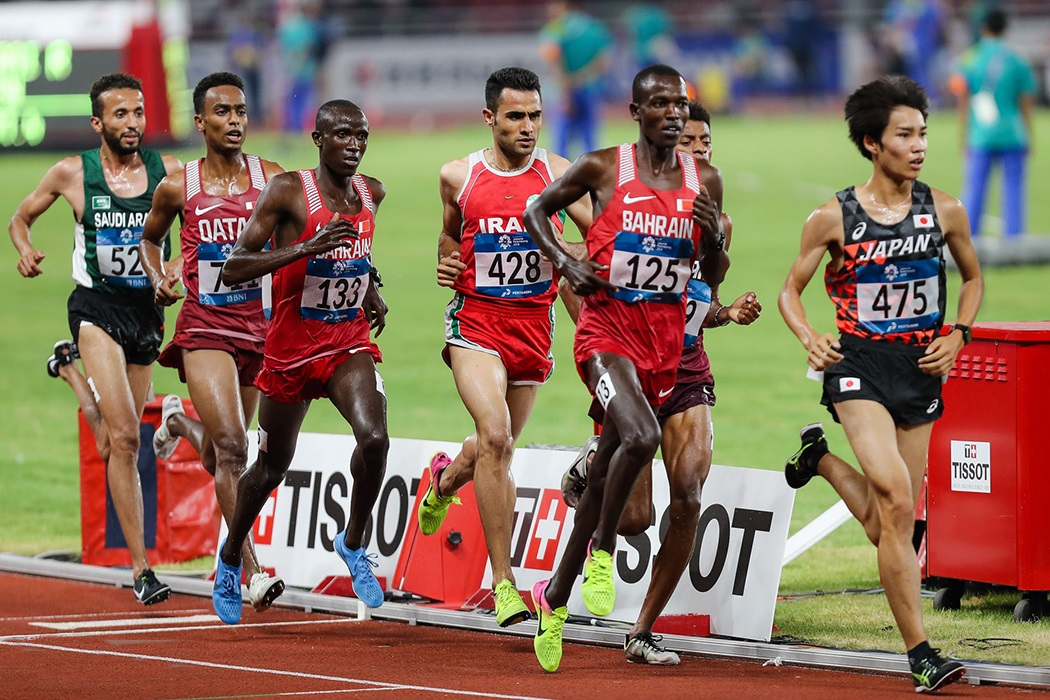
2018 Asian Games

Hossein Keyhani (Persian: حسین کیهانی; born 26 April 1990 in Songhor, Kermanshah Province) is an Iranian Kurdish runner specializing in the 3000 metres steeplechase. He represented Iran at the 2017 World Championships but failed to reach the final despite setting a new national record of 8:33.76. Earlier that year he became an Asian Champion in the event. In 2018 he won the steeplechase at the Asian Games, setting new national and Asian Games records.

In 2019 Keyhani was banned from competing for four years over a positive doping test for EPO. In 2025, he was banned for second time with an eight-year sanction also for testing positive for EPO.

== International competitions ==
Year	Competition	Venue	Position	Event	Notes
Representing Iran
2010	Asian Indoor Championships	Tehran, Iran	6th	3000 m	8:53.25
2011	Asian Championships	Kobe, Japan	7th	3000 m s'chase	9:04.23
2012	West Asian Championships	Dubai, United Arab Emirates	2nd	1500 m	3:56.65
2012	West Asian Championships	Dubai, United Arab Emirates	1st	3000 m s'chase	8:55.59
2014	Asian Indoor Championships	Hangzhou, China	4th	1500 m	3:50.80
2014	Asian Indoor Championships	Hangzhou, China	4th	4 × 400 m relay	3:13.55
2015	Asian Championships	Wuhan, China	4th	3000 m s'chase	8:48.48
2016	Asian Indoor Championships	Doha, Qatar	7th	1500 m	3:49.53
2016	Asian Indoor Championships	Doha, Qatar	7th	3000 m	8:14.99
2016	Asian Cross Country Championships	Manama, Bahrain	3rd		
2017	Asian Championships	Bhubaneswar, India	1st	3000 m s'chase	8:43.82
2017	World Championships	London, United Kingdom	24th (h)	3000 m s'chase	8:33.76
2017	Asian Indoor and Martial Arts Games	Ashgabat, Turkmenistan	3rd	3000 m	8:07.09
2018	Asian Indoor Championships	Tehran, Iran	1st	3000 m	8:37.68
2018	Asian Games	Jakarta, Indonesia	1st	3000 m s'chase	8:22.79 NR
2019	Asian Championships	Doha, Qatar	8th	5000 m	13:56.86
2019	Asian Championships	Doha, Qatar	4th	3000 m s'chase	8:36.44
2023	Asian Games	Hangzhou, China	7th	3000 m s'chase	8:45.98
2024	West Asian Championships	Basra, Iraq	2nd	3000 m s'chase	8:45.8
