= Kartik Kumar =

Indian athlete

Personal information
- Born: 12 May 1999 (age 27) Shimlana, Saharanpur, Uttar Pradesh, India
- Military career
- Branch: Indian Army
- Rank: Havildar
- Unit: Jat Regiment

Sport
- Sport: Track and field
- Event: 10,000 metres
Medal record
Men's athletics
Representing India
Asian Games
Silver medal – second place	2022 Hangzhou	10,000m
Asian U20 Championships
Bronze medal – third place	2018 Gifu	10,000m

Kartik Kumar (born 12 May 1999) is an Indian long-distance runner. He won the silver medal in the men's 10,000 m event at the 2022 Asian Games.

In November 2025, Kumar was issued with a three-year ban backdated to April 2025 by the United States Anti-Doping Agency after testing positive for methandienone, stanozolol, clostebol, and testosterone. The out-of-competition tests took place in Colorado Springs, United States in early 2025.
