= 2015 Asian Athletics Championships – Men's 3000 metres steeplechase =

The men's 3000 metres steeplechase at the 2015 Asian Athletics Championships was held on June 6.

== Results ==
Rank	Name	Nationality	Time	Notes
1st place, gold medalist(s)	John Kibet Koech	Bahrain	8:27.03	
2nd place, silver medalist(s)	Hashim Salah Mohamed	Qatar	8:36.02	
3rd place, bronze medalist(s)	Evans Rutto Chematot	Bahrain	8:42.76	
4	Hossein Keyhani	Iran	8:48.48	
5	Singh Jaiveer	India	8:52.16	
6	Aoi Matsumoto	Japan	9:00.34	
7	Naveen Kumar	India	9:12.72	
