= Gulveer Singh =

Indian long-distance runner (born 1998)

Personal information
- Born: 1 June 1998 (age 28) Atrauli, Uttar Pradesh, India
- Military career
- Branch: Indian Army
- Service years: 2018–present
- Rank: Naib Subedar
- Unit: The Grenadiers

Sport
- Sport: Athletics
- Event: Long-distance running

Achievements and titles
- Personal bests: 3000 m: 7:34.49 NR (2025); 3000 m (i): 7:38.26 NR (2025); 5000 m: 13:11.82 NR (2024); 5000 m (i): 12:59.77 AR, NR (2025); 10,000 m: 27:00.22 NR (2025); 25 km: 1:12.06 NR (2025)
Medal record
Men's athletics
Representing India
Asian Games
Silver medal – second place	2026 Aichi–Nagoya	1500 m
Silver medal – second place	2026 Aichi–Nagoya	10,000 m
Bronze medal – third place	2022 Hangzhou	10,000 m
Bronze medal – third place	2026 Aichi–Nagoya	5000 m
Asian Championships
Gold medal – first place	2025 Gumi	10,000 m
Gold medal – first place	2025 Gumi	5000 m
Bronze medal – third place	2023 Bangkok	5000 m
Commonwealth Games
Silver medal – second place	2026 Glasgow	10,000 m
Bronze medal – third place	2026 Glasgow	5000 m

Gulveer Singh (born 1 June 1998) is an Indian long-distance runner. He is a Naib Subedar in the Indian Army. He has won two gold medals in the 2025 Asian Athletics Championships, two silver and a bronze in the 2026 Commonwealth Games, a bronze medal in the 2022 Asian Games; and two silvers and a bronze medal in 2026 Asian Games.

== Career ==
Gulveer Singh won the bronze medal in the men's 10,000 metres at the 2022 Asian Games at Hangzhou. In the 2023 Asian Athletics Championships held in Bangkok in July 2023, he won the bronze medal in the men's 5000 metres. In the 2025 Asian Athletics Championships in Gumi, South Korea, he won gold medals in both men's 5000 and 10,000 metres.

In January 2026, he finished 40th in World Athletics Cross Country Championships in Tallahassee. On 15 March 2026, he became the first Indian to complete the half-marathon in under an hour, when he completed the New York City Half Marathon in 59 minutes 42 seconds, finishing third. In July 2026, he won the silver medal in the men's 10,000 metres, and the bronze medal in the men' 5000 metres at the 2026 Commonwealth Games in Glasgow, becoming the first Indian to win two medals in track events in a single edition of the Commonwealth Games.
