= Samuel Barata =

Portuguese long-distance runner (born 1993)

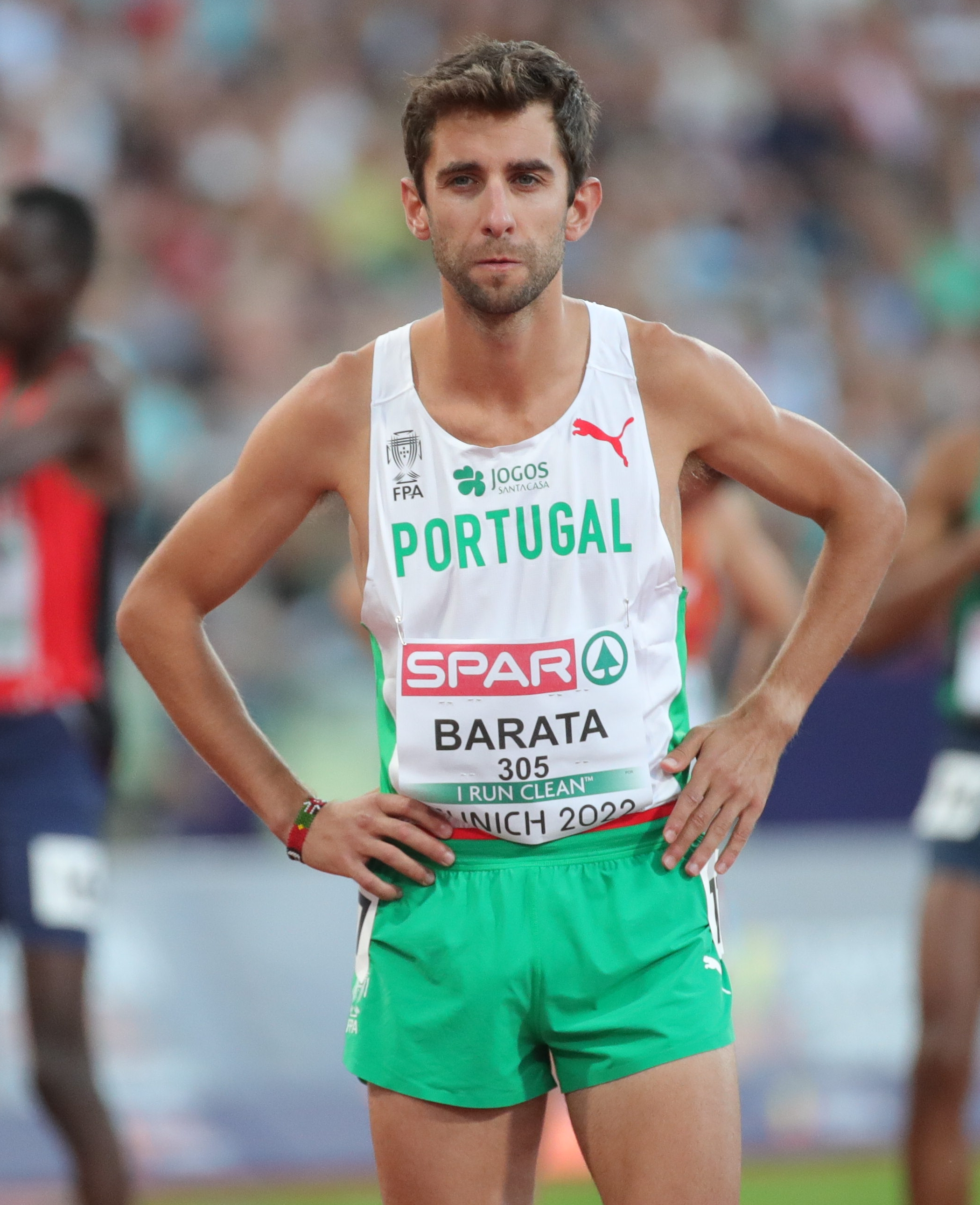
- Barata in 2022

Personal information
- Full name: Samuel Vila Barata
- Born: 19 July 1993 (age 32) Lausanne, Switzerland
- Education: Chemistry at University of Lisbon
- Height: 1.75 m (5 ft 9 in)

Sport
- Country: Portugal
- Sport: Athletics
- Event: Long-distance running
- University team: University of Lisbon
- Club: Benfica
- Coached by: Pedro Rocha (until 2020)

Samuel Vila Barata (born 19 July 1993) is a Portuguese long-distance runner. In 2020, he competed in the men's race at the World Athletics Half Marathon Championships held in Gdynia, Poland.

== Career ==
Barata represented Portugal at the European Athletics Championships both in 2016 and in 2018. In 2016, he competed in the men's half marathon and in 2018, he competed in the men's 10,000 metres event.

Barata represented Portugal at the 2017 Summer Universiade, held in Taipei, Taiwan, in the men's half marathon event. He did not finish his race. He finished in 5th place in the men's 10,000 metres event.

In 2021, Barata competed in the men's 3000 metres event at the European Athletics Indoor Championships held in Toruń, Poland.

== Achievements ==
Year	Competition	Venue	Position	Event	Notes
Representing Portugal
2020	World Championships (HM)	Gdynia, Poland	40th	Half marathon	1:02:19
2022	European Championships	Munich, Germany	–	10,000 m	DNF

== Personal bests ==
Outdoor

- 1500 metres – 3:45.20 (Braga 2023)
- 3000 metres – 8:01.05 (Lisbon 2020)
- 5000 metres – 13:31.90 (Vienna 2021)
- 10,000 metres – 28:03.94 (Coimbra 2021)
- 5K – 13:58 (Lisbon 2021)
- 10K – 28:12 (Valencia 2022)
- Half marathon – 59:40 (Valencia 2023) NR
- Marathon – 2:07:35 (Valencia 2023)

Indoor

- 3000 metres – 7:53.39 (Toruń 2021)
