= John Kibet Koech =

Kenyan-born long-distance runner (born 1995)

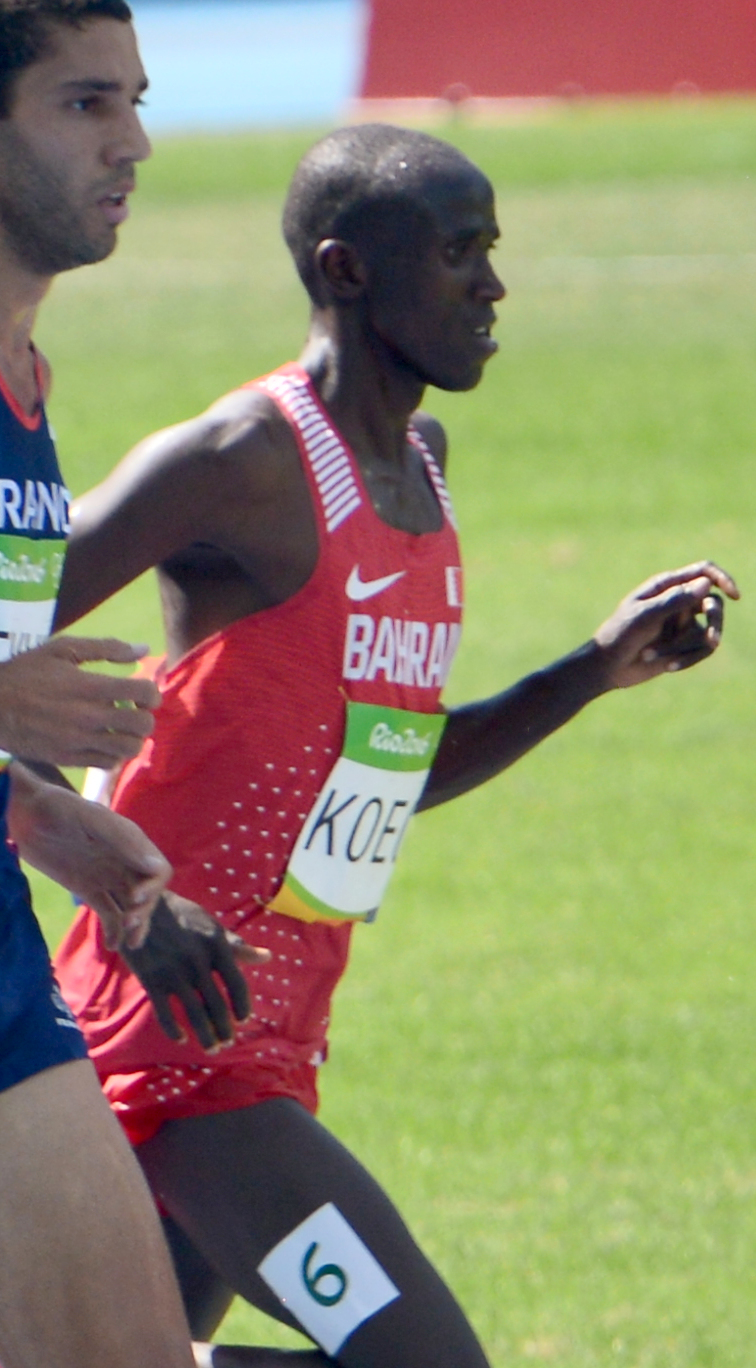
- Koech at the 2016 Olympics

Personal information
- Born: 23 August 1995 (age 31) Kericho
- Height: 168 cm (5 ft 6 in)
- Weight: 53 kg (117 lb)

Sport
- Sport: Athletics
- Events: 1500 m, 5000 m, steeplechase

Achievements and titles
- Personal bests: 1500 m – 3:44.7 (2013); 3000 mS – 8:09.62 (2016); 5000 m – 13:31.76 (2016)
Medal record
Representing Bahrain
Asian Athletics Championships
Gold medal – first place	2015 Wuhan	3000 m s'chase

John Kibet Koech (born 23 August 1995) is a Kenyan-born long-distance runner who competes internationally for Bahrain. He specialises in the 3000 metres steeplechase and was the winner of the event at the 2015 Asian Athletics Championships. His elder brother Isiah is an Olympic long-distance runner.

Koech first began competing at national level in the steeplechase in 2012, running at the national junior championships. He also acted as pacemaker at the Herculis meeting that year. The following year he won at the Kenyan Athletics Championships, but placed tenth at the national trial event for the 2013 World Championships in Athletics. His best performance of the year was a personal best of 8:16.96 minutes at the DN Galan, where he placed sixth – this time ranked him twentieth in the world for the event that season.

Koech switched his international eligibility to Bahrain in September 2013. In the 2014 season he competed extensively on the track and field circuit. He was runner-up to Jacob Araptany at the Golden Grand Prix in Japan, then had a season's best of 8:19.99 minutes in Bydgoszcz, which ultimately placed him in the top-25 in the year's world lists, as well as second in the world junior category lists. On the 2014 IAAF Diamond League circuit he was tenth at the Athletissima meeting and 13th at the Herculis meeting. As the second highest ranked Asian runner, after Abubaker Ali Kamal of Qatar (another Kenyan emigrant), he was selected to represent the region at the 2014 IAAF Continental Cup, where he placed fifth.

At the 2015 Arab Athletics Championships, held in Bahrain, he missed out on a steeplechase medal behind African opposition, taking fourth. A month later at the IAAF World Challenge Beijing he gave a stronger performance with a personal best of 8:14.75 minutes for third place. His first major title followed shortly after at the 2015 Asian Athletics Championships where he was the steeplechase gold medallist, succeeding his compatriot and fellow former Kenyan Tareq Mubarak Taher.

== International competitions ==
Year	Competition	Venue	Position	Event	Notes
2014	IAAF Continental Cup	Marrakech, Morocco	5th	3000 m s'chase	8:28.96
2015	Arab Championships	Isa Town, Bahrain	4th	3000 m s'chase	8:31.35
2015	Asian Championships	Wuhan, China	1st	3000 m s'chase	8:27.03
2015	World Championships	Beijing, China	15th (h)	3000 m s'chase	8:38.62
2016	Olympic Games	Rio de Janeiro, Brazil	18th (h)	3000 m s'chase	8:28.81
2017	Islamic Solidarity Games	Baku, Azerbaijan	4th	3000 m s'chase	8:34.27
2018	West Asian Championships	Amman, Jordan	1st	3000 m s'chase	8:46.60
2018	Asian Games	Jakarta, Indonesia	4th	3000 m s'chase	8:32.72
2019	Arab Championships	Cairo, Egypt	1st	3000 m s'chase	8:30.75
2019	Asian Championships	Doha, Qatar	1st	3000 m s'chase	8:25.87
2021	Olympic Games	Tokyo, Japan	–	3000 m s'chase	DNF
2022	Islamic Solidarity Games	Konya, Turkey	4th	3000 m s'chase	9:19:64
2023	Arab Games	Oran, Algeria	6th	3000 m s'chase	8:53.94
2023	Asian Games	Hangzhou, China	10th	3000 m s'chase	9:03.75
