= 2025 Asian Athletics Championships – Men's 5000 metres =

Men's 5000 metres at the 2025 Asian Athletics Championships
- Venue: Gumi Civic Stadium
- Location: Gumi, South Korea
- Dates: 30 May
- Competitors: 19 from 13 nations
- Winning time: 13:24.77 CR

Medalists
gold medal	Gulveer Singh	India
silver medal	Kieran Tuntivate	Thailand
bronze medal	Nagiya Mori	Japan

The men's 5000 metres event at the 2025 Asian Athletics Championships was held on 30 May.

== Records ==
Records before the 2025 Asian Athletics Championships
Record	Athlete (nation)	Time (s)	Location	Date
World record	Joshua Cheptegei (UGA)	12:35.36	Fontvieille, Monaco	14 August 2020
Asian record	Albert Rop (BHR)	12:51.96	Fontvieille, Monaco	19 July 2013
Championship record	Mohamad Al-Garni (QAT)	13:34.47	Wuhan, China	4 June 2015
World leading	Grant Fisher (USA)	12:44.09	Boston, United States	14 February 2025
Asian leading	Gulveer Singh (IND)	12:59.77	Boston, United States	21 February 2025

== Schedule ==
The event schedule, in local time (UTC+9), was as follows:

Date	Time	Round
30 May	18:40	Final

== Results ==
Place	Athlete	Nation	Time	Notes
1st place, gold medalist(s)	Gulveer Singh	India	13:24.77	CR
2nd place, silver medalist(s)	Kieran Tuntivate	Thailand	13:24.97	
3rd place, bronze medalist(s)	Nagiya Mori	Japan	13:25.06	
4	Keita Satoh	Japan	13:26.77	
5	Albert Rop	Bahrain	13:33.41	SB
6	Abhishek Pal	India	13:33.51	PB
7	Yu Shuiqing	China	13:35.93	PB
8	Abdikani Mohamed Hamid	Bahrain	13:36.92	PB
9	Nursultan Keneshbekov	Kyrgyzstan	13:45.67	PB
10	Maxim Frolovskiy	Kazakhstan	14:04.08	PB
11	Park Jae-woo	South Korea	14:05.20	PB
12	Chien Tzu-chieh	Chinese Taipei	14:18.52	PB
13	Mukesh Pal	Nepal	14:19.65	PB
14	Khasan Mirsoatov	Uzbekistan	14:19.80	PB
15	Mao Jinhu	China	14:28.28	
16	Sulaiman Zhusup	Kyrgyzstan	14:37.99	PB
17	Gawa Zangpo	Bhutan	14:40.64	SB
18	Baek Seung-ho	South Korea	15:04.41	
—	Tariq Al-Amri	Saudi Arabia	DNF	
—	Yacine Guermali	Philippines	DNS	
—	Seyedamir Zamanpour	Iran	DNS	
