= Mayu Kobayashi =

Japanese sprinter (born 1996)

Personal information
- Native name: 小林 茉由
- Nationality: Japan
- Born: 10 November 1996 (age 29)
- Education: Nippon Sport Science University

Sport
- Sport: Athletics
- Event: 400 metres
- Club: J.VIC

Achievements and titles
- National finals: 2021 Japanese Champs; 400m, 1st (gold)
- Personal best: 400m: 52.86 (2022)

Mayu Kobayashi (Japanese: 小林 茉由; born 10 November 1996) is a Japanese sprinter specializing in the 400 metres. She was the 2021 Japanese Champion in the 400 m and represented Japan at the 2022 World Athletics Championships.

== Career ==
Kobayashi competed in the women's 4 × 400 m relay and mixed 4 × 400 m relays at the 2021 World Athletics Relays.

Kobayashi won the 400 m at the 2021 Japan Championships in 53.86.

Kobayashi competed in the mixed 4 × 400 m relays at the 2022 World Championships.
