= Kazuya Shiojiri =

Japanese athletics competitor

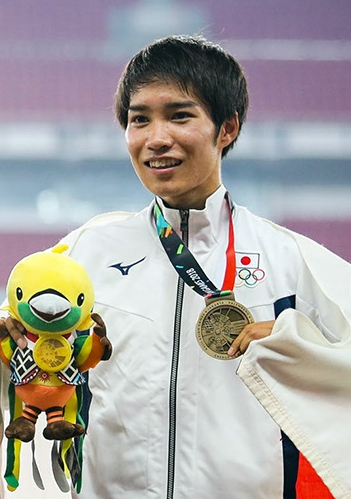
- Shiojiri at the 2018 Asian Games

Personal information
- Born: 8 November 1996 (age 29) Isesaki, Gunma
- Height: 170 cm (5 ft 7 in)
- Weight: 53 kg (117 lb)

Sport
- Sport: Athletics
- Event(s): 5000 m, 10,000 m, steeplechase
- College team: Juntendo University
- Coached by: Akira Nakamura

Achievements and titles
- Personal best(s): 3000 mSC – 8:27.25 (2019); 3000 m – 7:46.37 (2023); 5000 m – 13:16.53 (2021); 10,000 m – 27:09.80 (2023); Half marathon – 1:01:22 (2018)
Medal record
Men's athletics
Representing Japan
Asian Games
Bronze medal – third place	2018 Jakarta	3000 m st.
Asian Championships
Silver medal – second place	2023 Bangkok	5000 m
Bronze medal – third place	2019 Doha	3000 m st.
Asian Indoor Championships
Gold medal – first place	2026 Tanjijn	3000 m
Summer Universiade
Bronze medal – third place	2017 Taipei	10,000 m

Kazuya Shiojiri (born 8 November 1996) is a Japanese steeplechase and long-distance runner.

== Professional life ==
He competed in the steeplechase at the 2016 Summer Olympics, but failed to reach the final. He won a bronze medal in this event at the 2018 Asian Games.

== International competitions ==
Year	Competition	Venue	Position	Event	Notes
Representing the Japan
2014	World Junior Championships	Eugene, United States	9th	3000 m s'chase	8:45.66
2016	Olympic Games	Rio de Janeiro, Brazil	33rd (h)	3000 m s'chase	8:40.98
2017	Universiade	Taipei, Taiwan	3rd	10,000 m	29:20.96
2018	Asian Games	Jakarta, Indonesia	3rd	3000 m s'chase	8:29.42
2019	Asian Championships	Doha, Qatar	3rd	3000 m s'chase	8:32.25
2023	Asian Championships	Bangkok, Thailand	2nd	5000 m	13:43.92
2023	World Championships	Budapest, Hungary	35th (h)	5000 m	13:51.00
2023	Asian Games	Hangzhou, China	5th	10,000 m	28:35.02
2026	Asian Indoor Championships	Tianjin, China	1st	3000 m	7:53.87
