= 2025 Asian Athletics Championships – Men's 10,000 metres =

Men's 10,000 metres at the 2025 Asian Athletics Championships
- Venue: Gumi Civic Stadium
- Location: Gumi, South Korea
- Dates: 27 May
- Competitors: 19 from 13 nations
- Winning time: 28:38.63

Medalists
gold medal	Gulveer Singh	India
silver medal	Mebuki Suzuki	Japan
bronze medal	Albert Rop	Bahrain

The men's 10,000 metres event at the 2025 Asian Athletics Championships was held on 27 May.

== Records ==
Records before the 2025 Asian Athletics Championships
Record	Athlete (nation)	Time (s)	Location	Date
World record	Joshua Cheptegei (UGA)	26:11.00	Valencia, Spain	7 October 2020
Asian record	Ahmad Hassan Abdullah (QAT)	26:38.76	Brussels, Belgium	5 September 2003
Championship record	Hasan Mahboob (BHR)	28:23.70	Guangzhou, China	14 November 2009
World leading	Ishmael Kipkurui (KEN)	26:50.21	San Juan Capistrano, United States	29 March 2025
Asian leading	Gulveer Singh (IND)	27:00.22	San Juan Capistrano, United States	29 March 2025

== Schedule ==
The event schedule, in local time (UTC+9), was as follows:

Date	Time	Round
27 May	16:20	Final

== Results ==
Place	Athlete	Nation	Time	Notes
1st place, gold medalist(s)	Gulveer Singh	India	28:38.63	
2nd place, silver medalist(s)	Mebuki Suzuki	Japan	28:43.84	
3rd place, bronze medalist(s)	Albert Rop	Bahrain	28:46.82	SB
4	Sawan Barwal	India	28:50.53	
5	Yu Shuiqing	China	28:57.39	PB
6	Abdikani Mohamed Hamid	Bahrain	29:30.93	
7	Park Jae-woo	South Korea	29:42.05	PB
8	Nursultan Keneshbekov	Kyrgyzstan	29:45.00	PB
9	Dambadarjaagiin Gantulga	Mongolia	30:08.69	PB
10	Kim Geon-oh	South Korea	30:11.33	
11	Kim Tae-hun	South Korea	30:15.21	
12	Robi Syianturi	Indonesia	30:17.94	SB
13	Mao Jinhu	China	30:40.11	
14	Ilya Tyapkin	Kyrgyzstan	31:31.76	SB
15	Tse Chun-yin	Hong Kong	32:15.71	SB
16	Shaun Goh	Singapore	32:20.98	PB
17	Pheara Vann	Cambodia	34:23.77	SB
—	Andrey Petrov	Uzbekistan	DNF	
—	Sangay	Bhutan	DNF	
