= Athletics at the 2017 Summer Universiade – Men's 10,000 metres =

The men's 10,000 metres event at the 2017 Summer Universiade was held on 24 August at the Taipei Municipal Stadium.

== Results ==
Rank	Name	Nationality	Time	Notes
1st place, gold medalist(s)	Sadic Bahati	Uganda	29:08.68	PB
2nd place, silver medalist(s)	Alexandru Nicolae Soare	Romania	29:12.76	PB
3rd place, bronze medalist(s)	Kazuya Shiojiri	Japan	29:20.96	
4	John Kateregga	Uganda	29:44.31	
5	Samuel Barata	Portugal	29:54.89	
6	Jeromy Andreas	South Africa	29:56.09	
7	Mokofane Kekana	South Africa	30:33.03	
8	Riley Cocks	Australia	30:47.00	
9	Kevin Tree	Canada	31:00.31	
10	Thijs Nijhuis	Denmark	31:10.61	
11	Marianio Eesou	South Africa	31:12.90	
12	Bryce Anderson	Australia	31:14.22	
13	Evan Esselink	Canada	31:18.20	
14	Sergio Alejandro López	Colombia	32:44.00	
15	Nawasinghe Mudiyanselage	Sri Lanka	32:55.67	
16	Abdullah Al-Quraini	Oman	33:14.52	
	Gantulga Dambadarjaa	Mongolia	DNF	
	Kenneth Migadde	Uganda	DNF	
	Ramazan Özdemir	Turkey	DNF	
	Siyambango Siyoto	Zambia	DNF	
	Takato Suzuki	Japan	DNS	
