= Athletics at the 2018 Asian Games – Men's 3000 metres steeplechase =

Men's 3000 metres steeplechase competition in Gelora Bung Karno stadium

Men's 3000 metres steeplechase at the 2018 Asian Games
- Venue: Gelora Bung Karno Stadium
- Date: 27 August 2018
- Competitors: 14 from 10 nations

Medalists
gold medal	Hossein Keyhani	Iran
silver medal	Yaser Bagharab	Qatar
bronze medal	Kazuya Shiojiri	Japan

The men's 3000 metres steeplechase competition at the 2018 Asian Games took place on 27 August 2018 at the Gelora Bung Karno Stadium.

== Schedule ==
All times are Western Indonesia Time (UTC+07:00)

Date	Time	Event
Monday, 27 August 2018	19:30	Final

== Records ==
Prior to this competition, the existing world, Asian and Games records were as follows.

World Record	Saif Saaeed Shaheen (QAT)	7:53.63	Brussels, Belgium	3 September 2004
Asian Record	Saif Saaeed Shaheen (QAT)	7:53.63	Brussels, Belgium	3 September 2004
Games Record	Tareq Mubarak Taher (BRN)	8:25.89	Guangzhou, China	23 November 2010

== Results ==
Rank	Athlete	Time	Notes
1st place, gold medalist(s)	Hossein Keyhani (IRI)	8:22.79	GR
2nd place, silver medalist(s)	Yaser Bagharab (QAT)	8:28.21	
3rd place, bronze medalist(s)	Kazuya Shiojiri (JPN)	8:29.42	
4	John Kibet Koech (BRN)	8:32.72	
5	Hashim Salah Mohamed (QAT)	8:35.40	
6	Evans Chematot (BRN)	8:36.60	
7	Ali Al-Amri (KSA)	8:38.29	
8	Shankar Lal Swami (IND)	8:43.43	
9	Kosei Yamaguchi (JPN)	8:47.41	
10	Tu Wenji (CHN)	8:51.47	
11	Atjong Tio Purwanto (INA)	8:54.32	
12	Felisberto de Deus (TLS)	9:14.07	
13	Nooraldeen Al-Humaidha (YEM)	9:18.48	
14	Elizar Gamashi (INA)	9:19.05	
