= Athletics at the 2022 Asian Games – Men's 10,000 metres =

Men's 10,000 metres at the 2022 Asian Games
- Venue: Hangzhou Olympic Expo Main Stadium
- Date: 30 September 2023
- Competitors: 16 from 10 nations

Medalists
gold medal	Birhanu Balew	Bahrain
silver medal	Kartik Kumar	India
bronze medal	Gulveer Singh	India

The men's 10,000 metres competition at the 2022 Asian Games took place on 30 September 2023 at the HOC Stadium, Hangzhou.

== Schedule ==
All times are China Standard Time (UTC+08:00)

Date	Time	Event
Saturday, 30 September 2023	20:20	Final

== Records ==
Prior to this competition, the existing world, Asian and Games records were as follows.

World Record	Joshua Cheptegei (UGA)	26:11.00	Valencia, Spain	7 October 2020
Asian Record	Ahmad Hassan Abdullah (QAT)	26:38.76	Brussels, Belgium	5 September 2003
Games Record	Bilisuma Shugi (BRN)	27:32.72	Guangzhou, China	26 November 2010

== Results ==
Legend

- DNF — Did not finish
- DNS — Did not start
- DSQ — Disqualified

Rank	Athlete	Time	Notes
1st place, gold medalist(s)	Birhanu Balew (BRN)	28:13.62	
2nd place, silver medalist(s)	Kartik Kumar (IND)	28:15.38	
3rd place, bronze medalist(s)	Gulveer Singh (IND)	28:17.21	
4	Ren Tazawa (JPN)	28:18.66	
5	Kazuya Shiojiri (JPN)	28:35.02	
6	Tariq Al-Amri (KSA)	28:46.79	
7	Deepak Adhikari (NEP)	29:35.06	
8	Robi Syianturi (INA)	29:55.31	
9	Rikki Martin Simbolon (INA)	30:56.66	
10	Bat-Ochiryn Ser-Od (MGL)	30:57.71	
11	Ilya Tyapkin (KGZ)	31:20.72	
12	Shin Yong-min (KOR)	31:33.89	
13	Vann Pheara (CAM)	32:52.13	
—	Nursultan Keneshbekov (KGZ)	DNF	
—	Dawit Fikadu (BRN)	DSQ	
—	Yousef Al-Asiri (KSA)	DNS	
