= Komori =

Japanese printing press manufacturer

Komori Corporation 株式会社小森コーポレーション
- Type: Public KK
- Traded as: TYO: 6349
- Industry: Machinery
- Founded: Higashikomagata, Sumida-ku, Tokyo, Japan (October 20, 1923; 102 years ago)
- Headquarters: 11-1 Azumabashi 3-chome, Sumida-ku, Tokyo 130-8666, Japan,
- Key people: Yoshiharu Komori (Chairman, President and CEO)
- Products: Printing presses; Printing equipment
- Revenue: ▲US$ 897 million (FY 2013) (¥ 91.83 billion) (FY 2013)
- Net income: ▲US$ 133 million (FY 2013) (¥ 13.65 billion) (FY 2013)
- Number of employees: 2,227 (as of March 31, 2018, Consolidated)
- Website: Official website

Komori Corporation (株式会社小森コーポレーション, Kabushiki-kaisha Komori kōporēshon) is a Japanese press manufacturer that manufactures web offset presses, security printing presses, sheet-fed offset presses, package printing presses and printing related equipment.

It is one of the last privately owned press producers. Komori uses Toyota-based manufacturing principles. Each web press is shown to its customer at the factory in full production. With a close inner circle of developers active in installations and global field service, Komori has used over the years Windows-based systems for press console functions. The mix of their own developments with third party products requires little or no integration process at the installation site.

Their main manufacturing plant is located in Tsukuba in Ibaraki Prefecture.
