= Avinash Sable =

Indian athlete (born 1994)

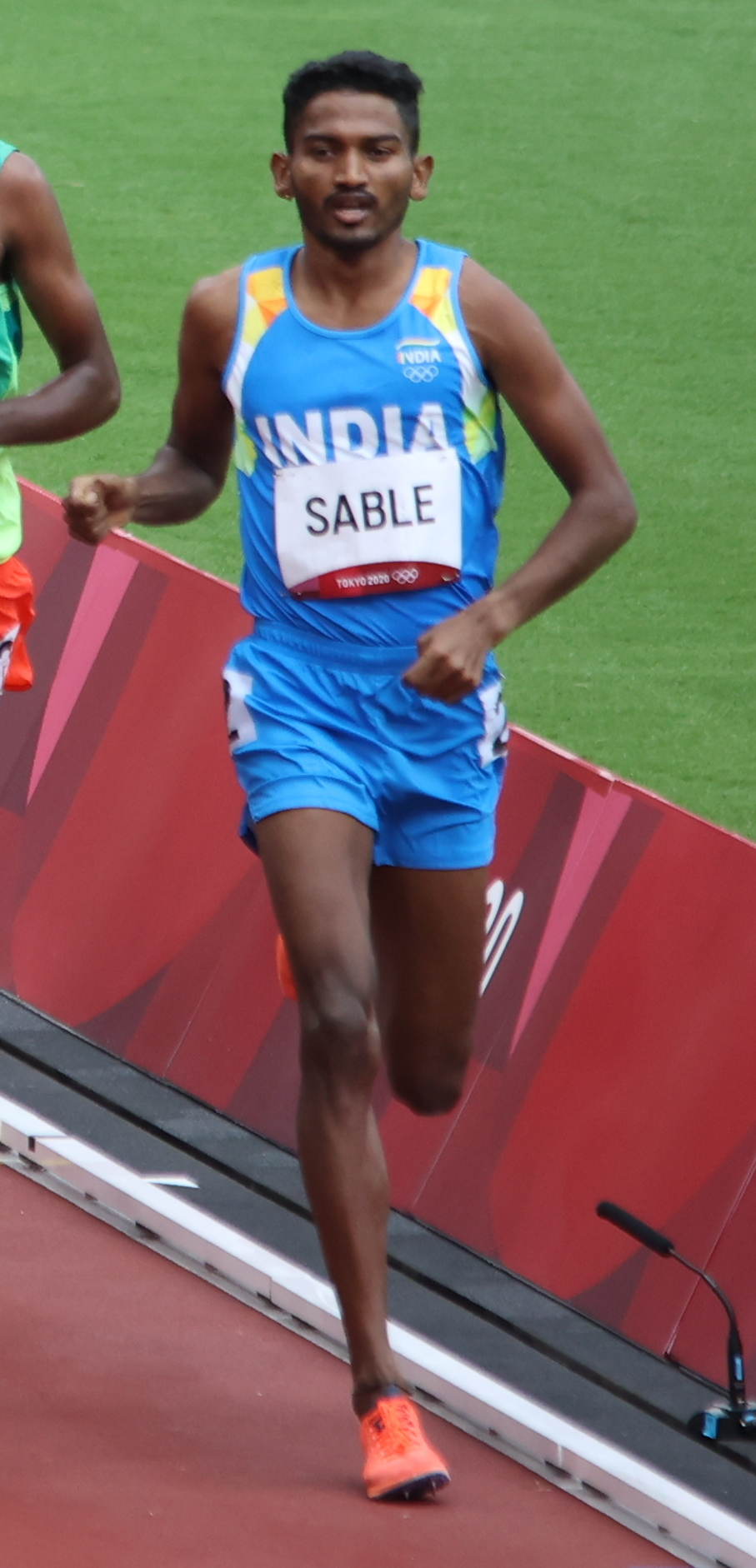
- Sable at the 2020 Tokyo Olympics

Personal information
- Full name: Avinash Mukund Sable
- Born: 13 September 1994 (age 32) Mandva, Maharashtra, India
- Military career
- Branch: Indian Army
- Service years: 2012–present
- Rank: Subedar
- Unit: Mahar Regiment

Sport
- Sport: Athletics
- Event: 3000 m steeplechase

Achievements and titles
- Personal bests: 3000 m steeplechase: 8:09.91 NR (2024), 8:19.50 AGR (2023); 5000 m: 13:19.30 (2023)
Medal record
Men's athletics
Representing India
Commonwealth Games
Silver medal – second place	2022 Birmingham	3000 m steeplechase
Asian Games
Gold medal – first place	2022 Hangzhou	3000 m steeplechase
Silver medal – second place	2022 Hangzhou	5000 m
Asian Championships
Gold medal – first place	2025 Gumi	3000 m steeplechase
Silver medal – second place	2019 Doha	3000 m steeplechase

Avinash Mukund Sable (born 13 September 1994) is an Indian track athlete. He specializes in 3000 m steeplechase and holds the national record of 8:09.91, set at the 2024 Paris Diamond League. Sable has represented India in the men's 3000 m steeplechase event at the 2020 and 2024 Olympic Games. He has been honored with the Arjuna Award in 2022.

== Early life ==
Sable was born on 13 September 1994 in Mandva village near Ashti, Beed in Maharashtra, into a family of farmers. From age six, he would run or walk the 6 km (3.7 mi) distance between home and school as there was no transport facility in his village. While attending 12th grade, he worked on brick kilns and construction sites to support his family.

After completing 12th grade, he joined the Mahar Regiment of Indian Army, with postings at the Siachen Glacier in 2013–2014, the deserts of north-western Rajasthan followed by Sikkim in 2015. He first took part in inter-army cross country running in 2015 at the insistence of his colleagues, before switching to steeplechase under trainer Amrish Kumar Adhana. Sable, who was overweight, managed to lose 20 kg (44 lb) in three months, before joining the national camp where he was trained by Dr. Nikolai Snesarev. In 2018, Sable went back to coach Amrish as Snesarev's training routine did not "suit" him.

== Career ==
After failing to qualify for the 2018 Asian Games due to an ankle injury, Sable broke the 37-year-old national record of 8:30.88 held by Gopal Saini, by clocking 8:29.80 at the 2018 National Open Championships in Bhubaneswar. He set a new national record of 8:28.94 in March 2019 at the Federation Cup in Patiala, as a result of which he qualified for the 2019 Asian Championships and 2019 World Championships. He became the first male steeplechaser from India to qualify for the World Championships since Deena Ram in 1991.

Sable won the silver medal at the 2019 Asian Athletics Championships, his debut international event, with a timing of 8:30.19. On 1 October 2019, he again broke his own national record at the World Championships where he ran 8:25.23 in the heats, despite twice being at the receiving end of Takele Nigate's accidental tripping during the race, to finish seventh in the heats and out of contention for the final. However, after a successful appeal by the Athletics Federation of India, Sable was included in the final and became the first Indian to qualify for the 3000 m steeplechase final at the World Championships. He further improved the national record to 8:21.37 in the final, finishing 13th out of 16 runners, and qualified for the 2020 Tokyo Olympics.

Sable set a new national record at the 2020 Delhi Half Marathon, completing the run in less than 61 minutes.

At the 2020 Tokyo Olympics, Sable placed seventh in the heats, setting a new national record to 8:18.12. He was the fastest non-qualifier across all heats. In 2022, Sable set two further national records, first at the Indian Grand Prix (8:16.21), and then at the Meeting International Mohamed VI in Rabat (8:12.48), placing 5th (his current highest Diamond League rank).

Sable won the silver medal in men's 3000 m steeplechase at the 2022 Commonwealth Games with a new national record time of 8:11.20. It was also the first time an athlete outside Kenya had won a medal in the event at the Commonwealth Games since 1994.

Sable finished 35th at the 2023 World Cross Country Championships, clocking 31:43 over the 10 km distance in a field of over hundred athletes. At the 2022 Asian Games, he won the first ever gold medal for India in men's 3000 m steeplechase and silver in 5000 m.

He qualified for 2024 Paris Olympics after placing sixth in the Silesian leg of the 2023 Diamond League with a time of 8:11.63. At the 2024 Olympics, Sable finished fifth in the men's 3000 m steeplechase qualification heat with a time of 8:15:43 to qualify for the final, becoming the first Indian athlete to qualify for the final of this event. In the final, he led in the first lap, before falling back out of medal contention and finishing 11th out of 16 with a time of 8:14.18.
