= Yuta Bando =

Japanese long-distance runner

Personal information
- Born: 21 November 1996 (age 28)

Sport
- Country: Japan
- Sport: Long-distance running
- Team: Fujitsu

Yuta Bando (坂東 悠汰, Bandō Yūta; born 21 November 1996) is a Japanese long-distance runner.

== Career ==
In 2019, he competed in the senior men's race at the 2019 IAAF World Cross Country Championships held in Aarhus, Denmark. He finished in 65th place.

In 2020, he won the gold medal in the men's 5000 metres event at the 2020 Japan Championships in Athletics held in Niigata, Japan.

As of 2022, Bando was employed by Fujitsu as part of its corporate athletics team.
