= Kosei Yamaguchi =

Japanese long-distance runner

Personal information
- Born: 19 August 1991 (age 34)

Sport
- Country: Japan
- Sport: Long-distance running

Kosei Yamaguchi (山口 浩勢, Yamaguchi Kōsei; born 19 August 1991) is a Japanese long-distance runner. He competed in the senior men's race at the 2019 IAAF World Cross Country Championships held in Aarhus, Denmark. He finished in 80th place.

In 2017, he competed in the senior men's race at the IAAF World Cross Country Championships held in Kampala, Uganda. He finished in 73rd place. In 2018, he competed in the men's 3000 metres steeplechase event at the Asian Games held in Jakarta, Indonesia. He finished in 9th place.

In 2019, he competed in the men's 3000 metres steeplechase event at the Asian Athletics Championships held in Doha, Qatar. He finished in 6th place. In 2020, he won the gold medal in the men's 3000 metres steeplechase event at the 2020 Japan Championships in Athletics held in Niigata, Japan.

In 2021, he competed in the men's 3000 metres steeplechase event at the 2020 Summer Olympics held in Tokyo, Japan.
