= Yamada Corporation =

Japanese defense trading company

Yamada Corporation 株式会社山田洋行
- Type: Unlisted Company KK
- Industry: Defense trading company
- Founded: March 5, 1969
- Headquarters: Minato, Tokyo, Japan,
- Key people: Yoshihiko Yonezu, President & C.E.O. Shinji Yamada, Representative Director; Osamu Kimura, Senior Executive Officer; Yuichi Maruyama, Senior Executive Officer
- Number of employees: 90(2008)
- Website: www.yamada.co.jp

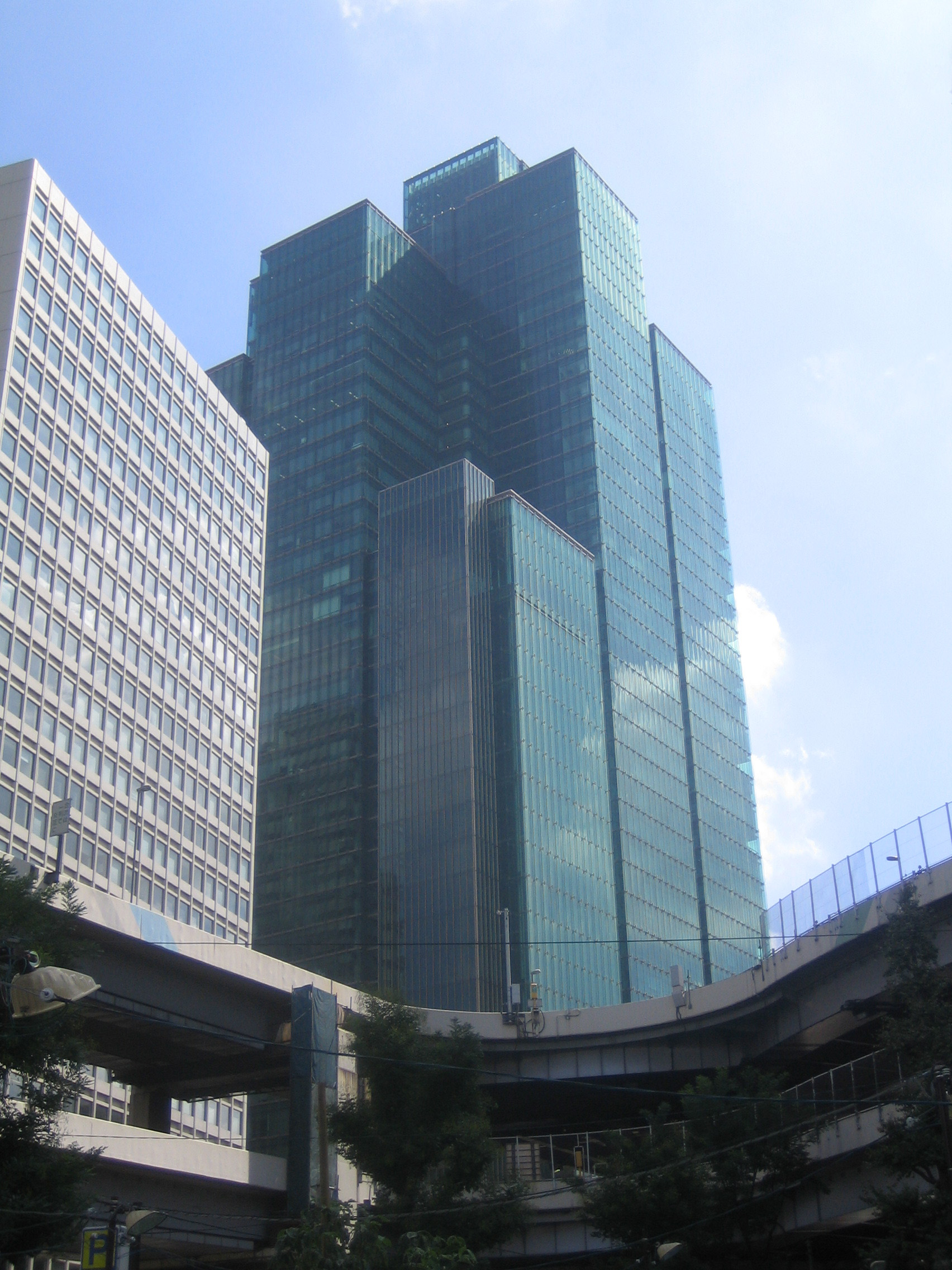
Izumi Garden Tower. Yamada Corporation is headquartered in this building.

Yamada Corporation (株式会社山田洋行, Kabushiki-gaisha Yamada Yōkō) is a defense trading company based in Tokyo, Japan.

== Overview ==
Subsidiaries:

- Yamada International Corporation (U.S.A.)
- Yamada International GmbH (Europe)

Affiliated companies:

- ALAE Engineering Co., Ltd.
- CKB Corporation
- Nihon U.I.C. Co., Ltd.

Yamada was a representative of Lockheed Martin for the Army Tactical Missile System (ATACMS), which is capable of reaching North Korea and Liancourt Rocks from Japan's mainland. The ATACMS has been displayed in the exhibition sponsored by the Congressional National Security Research Group (安全保障議員協議会), which is administered by Naoki Akiyama (秋山 直紀), the managing executive for Japan-U.S. Center for Peace and Cultural Exchange (日米平和・文化交流協会 ex Japan-U.S. Cultural Society, 日米文化振興会).

On November 2, 2007, Yomiuri Shimbun reported General Electric's decision to temporarily suspend its agreements with Yamada Corporation, the representative for C-X engine as well as its subsidiary Yamada International Corp. The C-X is the next-generation cargo transport aircraft under development by the Technical Research and Development Institute (TRDI) and Kawasaki Heavy Industries, Ltd. On December 3, 2007, GE terminated its representation contract with the firm.

In 2008, Yamada corp announces that all of its employees will be made redundant at the end of August 2008.

=== Corporate Executives ===
- Members of the Board: Isamu Ohtsu, Toshio Fukumoto and Yoshikazu Narimoto
- Corporate Auditors: Tetsuzo Fujita and Eiji Muramatsu
- Chief Executive Officer: Yoshihiko Yonezu
- Senior Executive Officers: Osamu Kimura and Yuichi Maruyama
- Executive Officers: Takeshi Tanaka, Hiroshi Watanabe, Susumu Moriyama and Hiroyuki Nomura

== History of scandals ==
=== Document forgery scandal ===
In 2001, the Japan Defense Agency (JDA) discovered the overbilling by Yamada Corporation for the Chaff and Flare Dispenser System made by BAE Systems.

The then Defense Agency conducted an investigation over the price of equivalent devices which were found to be considerably lower than quoted by Yamada. The Defense Agency contacted the BAE Systems and was informed of overpricing manipulation.

Instead of submitting the BAE Systems' quotation, Yamada forged the British company's document and submitted its own version to the agency.

In 2002, Yamada arranged a meeting in the United States between Japanese defense officials and a man impersonating BAE Systems official during the Agency's investigation into bill padding by Yamada. Later in the year, the ministry received a letter from BAE Systems stating that Yamada should not be held responsible (which was later revealed to be produced by Yamada without BAE's consent). Yamada amended the contract and refunded 100 million yen to the Defense Agency, but was not penalized for its act. However, companies such as NEC subsidiary and Fuji Industries have conducted similar act in the past and were penalized by the Japan Ministry of Defense. The Public Prosecution Office is currently investigating the case after requesting to the Japan Ministry of Defense to submit documents related to the case.

Regarding the forgery scandal, Yamada released a statement as follows: "To avoid interfering investigations underway, I cannot discuss the issue regarding the existence of such (forging) activities." – the company president & CEO Yoshihiko Yonezu (October 2007).

On November 23, 2007, the Japan Ministry of Defense said it will transactions with scandal-tainted defense equipment trading house. The ministry is investigating the matter and plans to seek a refund of padded bills from Yamada. Defense Minister Shigeru Ishiba said Sunday he is considering filing a criminal complaint against defense trader Yamada Corp. for padding bills for equipment supplied to the Maritime Self-Defense Force. In reference to the document forgery by the firm, the Defense Minister Shigeru Ishiba said "It's fraud rather than padding, as written estimates have been forged to try to defraud the entire Defense Ministry," Ishiba said "If the facts are confirmed, we should file a (criminal) complaint."

The Defense Minister Ishiba spoke in press conference that the ministry is investigating Yamada Corp. under suspicion of inflating bills by at least 30 million yen in 2001 in a deal involving Air Self-Defense Force transport aircraft.

Prosecutors raided the trading house Yamada Corp on November 30, 2007. The move came after prosecutors completed a search of the Defense Ministry headquarters in Tokyo.

The Defense Ministry is conducting further investigation over bills submitted by Yamada. The investigation revealed at least three more incidents in which the firm forged the quotations by non-Japanese manufacturer.

In the case for the US-2, U.S. manufacturer Dynamic Instruments Inc. estimated the cost for the instrument at $43,000. But Yamada, mediating the trade, sold it to the ministry for $68,000, making the ministry pay some ¥3.1 million more than the estimate.

In the second case, in which the ministry has yet to pay the money, Yamada signed a contract worth $31,816 with the ministry for four U.S.-made components for a hydraulic system on SH-60K helicopters. But the actual price of the components made by Autronics Corp. was $26,216.

In the third case, quotation for AWACS maintenance parts manufactured by Farwest Aircraft, Inc. had been forged from the original document.

The Defense Ministry official said the firm is thought to have overcharged drastically for four contracts concluded with German manufacturer Rheinmetall AG. Yamada has been involved in 666 contracts since fiscal 2002 as an agent for foreign defense equipment makers. Of those, 116 were signed with the head office of the Defense Ministry or the former Defense Agency, while the remaining 550 were concluded with their local branch offices and depots.

The ministry is sending copies of Yamada's documentation to 29 foreign manufacturers involved with the head office contracts and asking them if they are legitimate. Eight of the companies replied on a total of 39 contracts. In five of those contracts, the prices submitted were different from those the manufacturers had told Yamada. According to the bills, the four contracts with Germany's Rheinmetall totaled 340 million yen. Yamada is suspected of overcharging by 224.5 million yen, or 66 percent.

Further investigation by the Defense Ministry revealed at least 12 cases in which Yamada had produced fake quotation documents by falsifying letter-head and signature. Public Prosecution Office discovered that the firm used printer company to mimic the format and fonts used by manufacturers in order to modify the numbers of the original document. The investigation is thought to reveal more cases of bill-padding.

=== Relationships with politicians and the government ===
Yamada currently employs Democratic Party of Japan' s Shozo Azuma (東 祥三), an ex-member for the House of Representatives of Japan. It also employs several other retired officials and their family member from the Japan Ministry of Defense (former Japan Defense Agency).

Yoshihiko Yonezu (米津 佳彦), President & C.E.O. of the company, is an executive board member of the aforementioned Congressional National Security Research Group. Other members of the group include the current PM Yasuo Fukuda; current Defense Minister Shigeru Ishiba; a former leader of the Democratic Party of Japan Seiji Maehara; Ex-Defense Ministers Fumio Kyuma, Tokuichiro Tamazawa, Fukushiro Nukaga, Tsutomu Kawara and Gen Nakatani; Ex-Agriculture Ministers Tsutomu Takebe and Norihiko Akagi.

The House of Councillors panel decided to summon former Vice Defense Minister Takemasa Moriya as a sworn witness on November 15, 2007 in connection with a series of collusion scandals. The upper house's committee on foreign affairs and defense has also made its call on a former executive of Yamada Corp who is also at the center of the scandal, as a sworn witness as well as Yamada Corp President Yoshihiko Yonezu as a witness.

==== Yamada's ties with Naoki Akiyama ====
In 2003, Yamada Corp. has allegedly paid $600,000, to a U.S. group linked to Naoki Akiyama, the executive director of the Japan–U.S. Center for Peace and Cultural Exchange, as an attempt to land work as a subcontractor in a project to remove poison gas shells in Fukuoka Prefecture left over from the war. The payment was made under the title "business cooperation fees."

Prosecutors have searched the office of the Japan-U.S. Center for Peace and Cultural Exchange and Yamada's headquarters in Tokyo over the allegation. Former Defense Minister Fumio Kyuma and other lawmakers close to the defense industry serve as directors of the center.

The Defense Agency commissioned the center to conduct research for the project. Kobe Steel Ltd, was awarded the actual operation. Both contracts were awarded via bidding. Yamada served as a subcontractor for Kobe Steel, assuming such work as procuring equipment.

Public prosecution office found documents that indicate Yamada Corp would pay or has paid a total of $300,000 to an organization linked to a big defense figure as rewards for helping the company secure agency contracts with two U.S. defense makers in 2006.

The documents point to exchanges of money between Yamada and the organization linked to Naoki Akiyama, executive director of the Japan-U.S. Center for Peace and Cultural Exchange, which Tokyo prosecutors suspect has associations with the Yamada payoff scandals involving former Yamada executive Motonobu Miyazaki and former Vice Defense Minister Takemasa Moriya.

==== M-Ship ties involving Ex-Minister Kyuma ====
In 2006 Yamada transmitted a total of about $100,000 (10 million yen) to Naoki Akiyama, a senior official of a Japan-U.S. Center for Peace and Cultural Exchange, arrested last week on tax evasion charges.

Tokyo Public Prosecutor suspect Yamada sent the cash to Akiyama, for supporting negotiations with M Ship Co., a San Diego–based military equipment manufacturer, over a sales agent contract for its high-speed vessels. M-Ship claims that it has not committed to such contract.

Also revealed was that a former senior U.S. official close to Akiyama called M-Ship in advance to introduce Yamada to the U.S. company. Akiyama visited M-Ship in 2006 with Yamada subsid Yamada International Corp executives, for negotiations over the sale of high-speed vessels M80 Stiletto.

M-Ship admits it had received a call from the former senior U.S. official, who is also a director of Akiyama's Japan-U.S. center.

M-Ship said it has signed a memorandum of understanding with Yamada only for a market research purposes in Japan, but that it has not signed an agent contract with the company.

=== Company schism ===
Yamada's business records have been long time attributed to Motonobu Miyazaki. Media in Japan reported scandals regarding Miyazaki and Masashi Yamada's personal ties to the government and politicians. The media also reported that Special Investigation Department of Public Prosecutors Office are questioning Miyazaki and other Yamada Corporation employees over alleged illegal activities involving Miyazaki and Yamada Corporation. Miyazaki resigned from Yamada Corporation after failing an MBO causing distrust with the Yamada family, the 98% share holder of Yamada Corporation. After Miyazaki left the firm in June 2006, he established a new company, Nihon Mirise Corporation (NMC) in September 2006. Yonezu, the new president & CEO of Yamada, filed a court case to Tokyo District Court in October 2006 alleging loss caused by Miyazaki and his new company, as well as 13 employees of Nihon Mirise, for taking business away from Yamada. The loss claimed by Yamada is 1 billion yen.

Two individuals in charge of General Electric program, more specifically the engines for the next generation military cargo aircraft, leaves Yamada in December 2006 and joins Nihon Mirise. Yamada filed another lawsuit in February 2007 against the two individuals claiming for loss of GE business. The claimed loss is a half billion yen.

In March 2007, GE deleted Yamada distributorship for the C-X program. Yamada had already filed a lawsuit against NMC in February 2007 for taking GE's subject representation, prior to the firm actually losing the business. In Japan, such preempt legal action is exceedingly unusual to take before the claimed act has been conducted.

Later, GE designated Nihon Mirise as its distributor for the C-X engine from July 2007. In July 2007, Nihon Mirise formally became GE's distributor for the C-X program.

There are 7 ongoing lawsuits between Yamada and Nihon Mirise, of which 6 are against Nihon Mirise Corporation.

=== Industry response ===
In November 2007, GE decides to temporarily suspend all dealings with Yamada Corp and its splinter company, Nihon Mirise Corp. GE terminates its representation contract with Yamada on December 3, 2007. C Currently GE does not have a representative in Japan, pending open investigation of GE’s direct involvement of the FCPA violation.

Northrop Grumman terminated the representation rights assigned to Yamada Corporation in early November 2007, to stop all dealings with the firm. The US manufacturer assigned Yamada the representation rights for E-2C Airborne Early Warning (AEW) aircraft from Sumitomo Corporation in 1997. The representation rights has been assigned to Sumitomo Corp as of Nov. 2007.

Lockheed Martin, Textron and many other manufacturers have terminated Yamada. Japan Ministry of Defense has halted all deals with Yamada and will not resume until all the wrongdoings are discovered and damages compensated. Arising to Yamada's bill-padding case, the Japan MOD is in the process of reviewing its procurement process.

Argo-tech Corporation has filed a lawsuit at a U.S. district court in Cleveland against Yamada and its U.S. subsidiary Upsilon International, claiming Yamada's involvement in bribery cases violated their contract which prohibits FCPA related conduct, hence the representation rights should be terminated. Argo-tech has also demanded compensation from Yamada and its subsidiary.

In response, Yamada has filed a countersuit against Argo-Tech at a district court in California. Yamada is claiming that the termination of their contract is illegal as FCPA violation has no relations to the representation rights.

Anti-corruption investigators in Britain are currently probing a suspected bribery scandal involving Smiths Detection. It was reported by the Financial Times that Serious Fraud Office has begun its investigation and asked details from Smiths. Smiths claims there are no evidence of wrongdoing. According to the report, the companies have ended their business relationship.

=== Series of lawsuits by Yamada ===
==== In Japan ====
6 filed against Nihon Mirise Corporation
1 filed from Nihon Mirise Corporation
filed against Japan Ministry of Defense

==== In US ====
1 filed against Argo-Tech Corporation in California District Court
1 filed from Argo-Tech Corporation in Cleveland District Court

== History timeline ==
- May 1936 Yamada Corporation founded in Yokohama
- Mar 1969 Yamada Corporation incorporated in Tokyo
- Oct 1970 Nagoya Branch established
- Oct 1972 Yamada International Corp. incorporated in Los Angeles
- Apr 1980 Osaka Branch established
- Dec 1981 New York Branch of Yamada International Corp. established
- Feb 1987 Gifu Office established
- Apr 1990 Washington D.C. Office of Yamada International Corp. established
- May 1996 London Office of Yamada International Corp., UK established (later closed)
- June 1997 GE Office of Yamada International Corp. established in Cincinnati, Ohio
- Apr 2001 Frankfurt Office of Yamada International Corp., Germany established
- Feb 2002 Yamada International GmbH (Europe) incorporated
- Apr 2003 Yamada International Corp. headquarters relocated to Washington D.C.
- Mar 2004 Cincinnati Office of Yamada International Corp. established.
- Jun 2004 Acquired 100% share of Nihon U.I.C. Co., Ltd.
- 2008 Cincinnati Office, GE Office of Yamada International Corp and Gifu Office closed. Washington D.C. Office of Yamada International Corp. relocated.
- (date unknown) Tel-Aviv Branch of Yamada International Corp. established
