= Albert Rop =

Kenyan-Bahraini long-distance runner

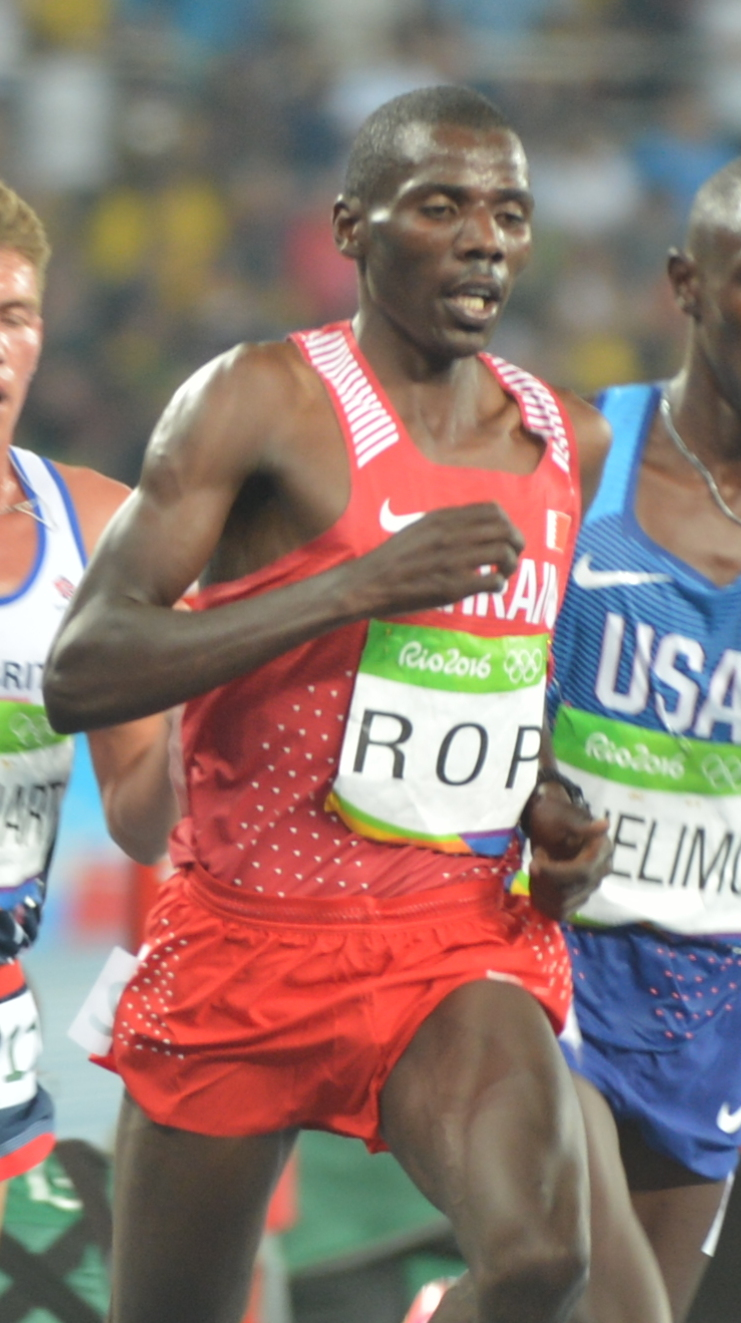
- Rop at the 2016 Olympics

Personal information
- Full name: Albert Kibichii Rop
- Born: 17 July 1992 (age 34)
- Height: 177 cm (5 ft 10 in)
- Weight: 63 kg (139 lb)

Sport
- Sport: Athletics
- Event: 1500–5000 m
Medal record
Men's athletics
Representing Bahrain
Asian Championships
Bronze medal – third place	2025 Gumi	10,000 m
Asian Indoor Championships
Silver medal – second place	2016 Doha	3000 m

Albert Kibichii Rop (born 17 July 1992) is a Kenyan athlete specialising in the long-distance events. He represents Bahrain in international competitions. In July 2013 at a meeting in Monaco, he set a new 5000 metres Asian record of 12:51.96.

== Competition record ==
Year	Competition	Venue	Position	Event	Notes
Representing Bahrain
2013	Arab Championships	Doha, Qatar	1st	5000 m	13:52.54
2014	Continental Cup	Marrakesh, Morocco	4th	5000 m	13:36.62
2014	Asian Games	Incheon, South Korea	3rd	5000 m	13:28.08
2015	Arab Championships	Isa Town, Bahrain	2nd	5000 m	13:18.55
2015	Asian Championships	Wuhan, China	2nd	5000 m	13:35.26
2015	World Championships	Beijing, China	11th	5000 m	14:00.12
2015	Military World Games	Mungyeong, South Korea	1st	5000 m	13:23.70
2016	Asian Indoor Championships	Doha, Qatar	2nd	3000 m	7:40.27
2016	Olympic Games	Rio de Janeiro, Brazil	7th	5000 m	13:08.79
2017	World Championships	London, United Kingdom	28th (h)	5000 m	13:32.40
2018	West Asian Championships	Amman, Jordan	1st	5000 m	13:42.94
2018	Asian Games	Jakarta, Indonesia	2nd	5000 m	13:43.76
2019	Arab Championships	Cairo, Egypt	2nd	5000 m	13:35.79
2019	Arab Championships	Cairo, Egypt	1st	10,000 m	28:21.08
2019	Asian Championships	Doha, Qatar	2nd	5000 m	13:37.57
2022	GCC Games	Kuwait City, Kuwait	1st	5000 m	13:44.70
2022	GCC Games	Kuwait City, Kuwait	1st	10,000 m	29:15.97
2022	Islamic Solidarity Games	Konya, Turkey	7th	5000 m	14:02.09
2022	Islamic Solidarity Games	Konya, Turkey	5th	10,000 m	28:45.66
2025	Asian Championships	Gumi, South Korea	5th	5000 m	13:33.41
2025	Asian Championships	Gumi, South Korea	3rd	10,000 m	28:46.82

== Personal bests ==
Outdoor

- 1500 metres – 3:45.7 (Nairobi 2013)
- 3000 metres – 7:32.02 (Paris 2016)
- 5000 metres – 12:51.96 (Monaco 2013)
- 10,000 metres – 28:21.08 (Cairo 2019)
- 10k (road) – 27:44 (Utrecht 2018)
- Half marathon – 1:01:21 (Valencia 2018)

Indoor

- 3000 metres – 7:38.77 (Ghent 2014)
- 5000 metres – 13:09.43 (Birmingham 2017)

== See also ==
- List of Asian Games medalists in athletics
