= Toho Bank =

Bank of Japan

The Toho Bank, Ltd 東邦銀行
- Company type: Public (TYO: 8345)
- Industry: Banking; Financial services
- Founded: Koriyama, Fukushima, Japan
- Headquarters: Fukushima, Japan (December 1946)
- Number of locations: 122
- Area served: Tōhoku region, Japan
- Key people: Kiyoshi Kitamura (President)
- Products: Retail Banking; Payday advance Mortgages; Consumer Finance; Investment Banking
- Revenue: ¥56.89B
- Net income: ¥4.49B
- Total assets: ¥4.66T
- Number of employees: 1,975
- Website: Toho Bank homepage

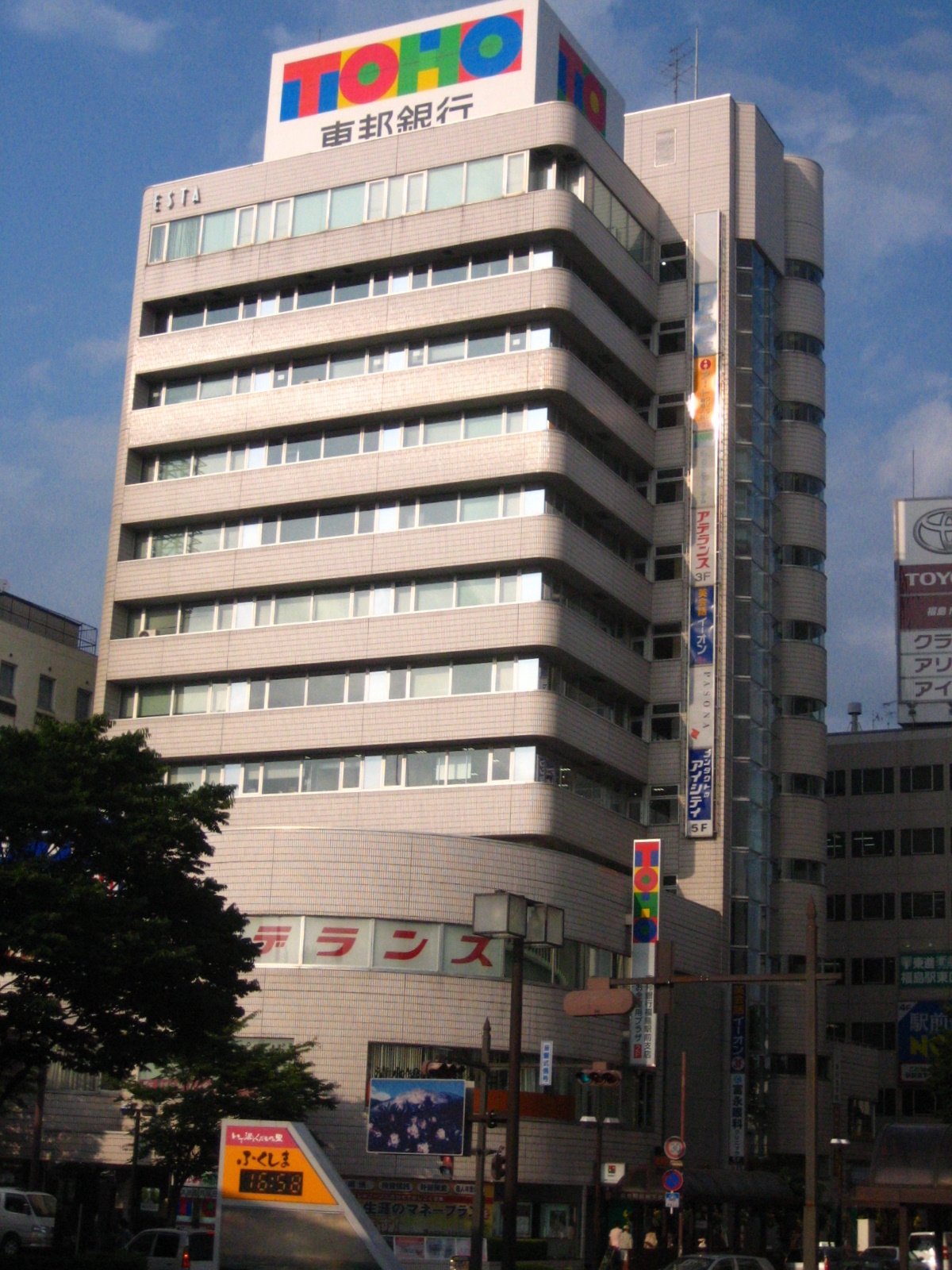
Toho Bank branch office in Fukushima

The Toho Bank, Ltd. (株式会社東邦銀行, Kabushiki-gaisha Tōhō Ginkō) is a Japanese regional bank headquartered in Fukushima, Fukushima Prefecture, in the Tōhoku region of northern Honshū. Toho Bank provides financial services for individual and corporate customers, including deposits, loans, real estate, securities trading and investment, foreign exchange, bond underwriting and registration services as well as ATM and credit card services. As of 2021, the company operates 122 branches.

== History ==
The Toho Bank was established on November 4, 1941 by the merger of the Koriyama Commercial Bank with the Aizu Bank and Shirakawa Bank, with its head office in the city of Koriyama, Fukushima. In August 1942, the Miharu Bank, Inawashiro Bank and Iwase Industrial Bank were merged into the Toho Bank as part the Japanese government’s wartime consolidation of Japanese industries. In February 1943, the bank was further enlarged by merger with the Yabuki Bank, Tamura Entrepreneurial Bank and the Iwato Bank, and with the Fukushima Savings Bank in November 1944. The head office was relocated to the city of Fukushima in December 1946. The Toho Bank was listed on the second section of the Tokyo Stock Exchange from April 1973, and in the first section since February 1974.

Like several other Japanese regional banks around the end of the Japanese bubble economy, the Toho Bank opened up branches in New York City and Hong Kong in 1990 and 1992, respectively. Both of these branches were closed in the late 1990s. While the bank has recently made advances in reducing its burden of non-performing loans and increasing its capital-adequacy ratio, it has recently been cited by the Japanese Financial Services Agency for excessive incidents of misplacing customer information.

== See also ==
- List of banks
- List of banks in Japan
