= Hyuga Endo =

Japanese long-distance runner

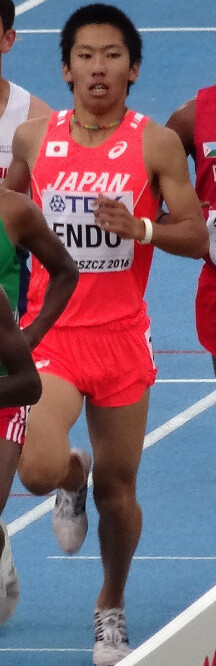

Personal information
- Born: 5 August 1998 (age 27) Kōriyama, Japan
- Height: 1.68 m (5 ft 6 in)
- Weight: 54 kg (119 lb)

Sport
- Sport: Athletics
- Events: 1500 metres; 3000 metres; 5000 metres
Medal record
Representing Japan
Asian Athletics Championships
Gold medal – first place	2023 Bangkok	5000 metres

Hyuga Endo (遠藤日向, Endō Hyūga, born 5 August 1998) is a Japanese long-distance runner. He won the 5000 metres at the 2023 Asian Athletics Championships.

== Personal bests ==
Outdoor

- 1500 metres – 3:36.69 (Kumamoto 2022)
- 3000 metres – 7:45.08 (Yokohama 2023)
- 5000 metres – 13:10.69 (Nobeoka 2022)
- 10,000 metres – 29:10.21 (Konosu 2017)
- 5K (road) – 13:50 (Fukuoka 2022) NR

Indoor

- 3000 metres – 7:49.66 (Boston 2020)
- 5000 metres – 13:27.81 (Boston 2019)
