= Shikoku University =

Higher education institution in Tokushima Prefecture, Japan

Coordinates: 34°6′8″N 134°33′49″E

- 四国大学; Shikoku Daigaku
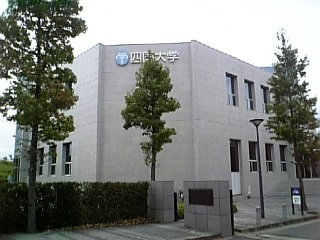
- Type: Private
- Established: 1925
- Location: Tokushima, Tokushima, Japan
- Website: https://www.shikoku-u.ac.jp/

Shikoku University (四国大学, Shikoku daigaku) is a private university in Tokushima, Japan.
