= Hiroki Matsueda =

Japanese long-distance runner

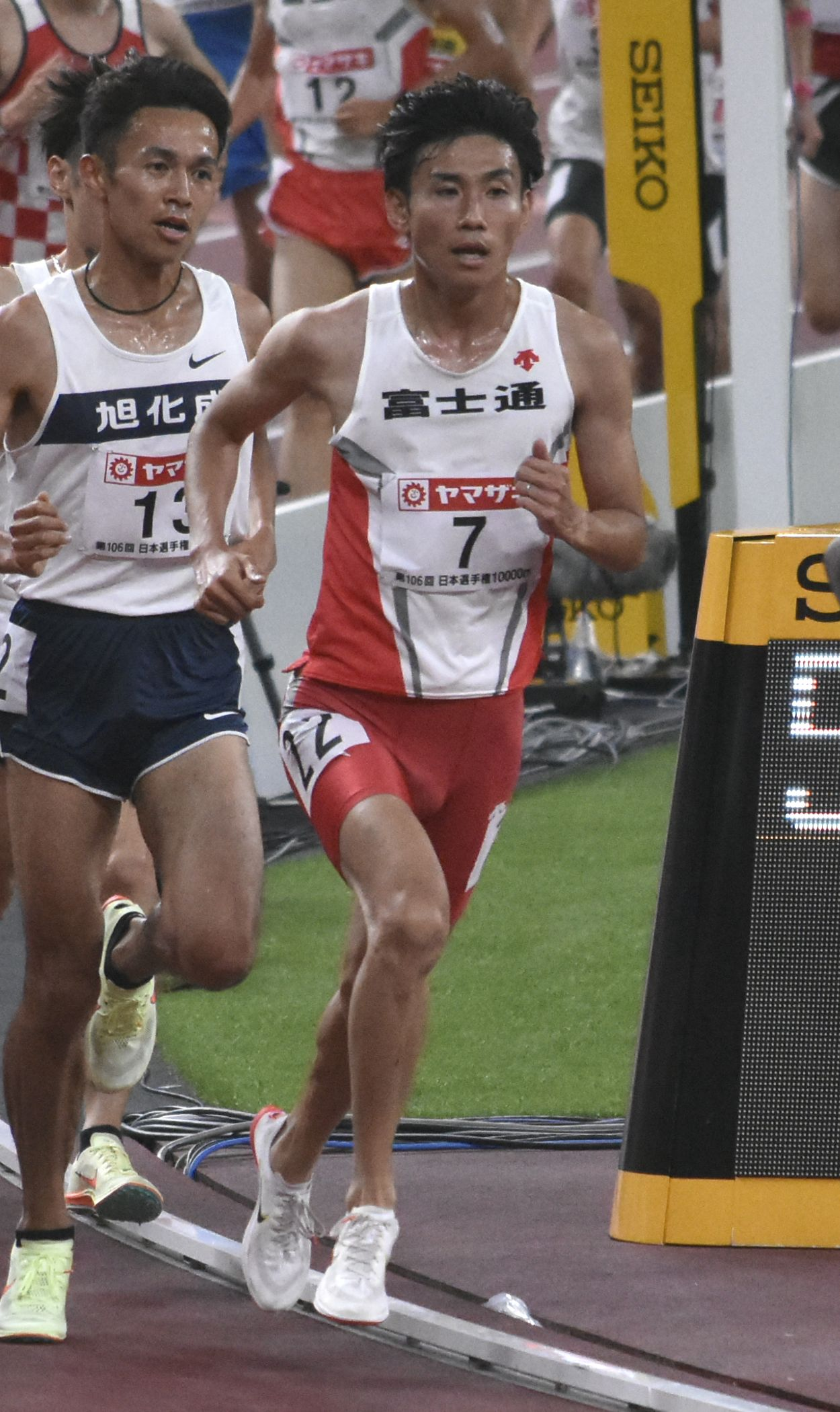
- Matsueda at the 2022 Japan Championships

Personal information
- Nationality: Japanese
- Born: 20 May 1993 (age 33)
- Height: 1.75 m (5 ft 9 in)
- Weight: 59 kg (130 lb)

Sport
- Sport: Athletics
- Event: 5000 m
- Team: Fujitsu

Achievements and titles
- Personal bests: 1500 m: 3:38.12 (Yokohama 2019); 3000 m: 7:54.33 (Kawasaki 2017); 5000 m: 13:24.29 (Chitose 2020); 10,000 m: 28:29.01 (Yokohama 2016); Half marathon: 1:01:29 (Yamaguchi 2021)
Medal record
Men's athletics
Representing Japan
Asian Championships
Bronze medal – third place	2019 Doha	5000 m

Hiroki Matsueda (松枝博輝, born 20 May 1993) is a Japanese long-distance runner. He is expected to compete in the 5000 metres at the 2020 Summer Olympics. He also won the 5000 m at the 2017 and 2019 Japanese Championships and won the bronze medal in the same event at the 2019 Asian Athletics Championships.

As of 2022, he is part of the Fujitsu athletics team.
