= Ryuji Miura =

Japanese athlete (born 2002)

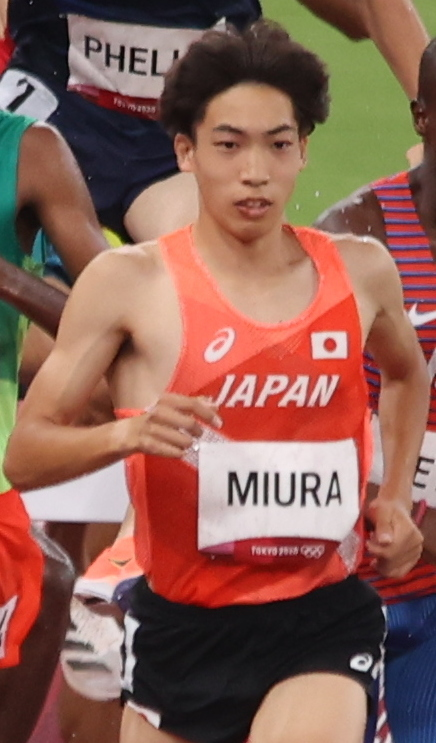
- Ryuji Miura at the 2020 Olympics

Personal information
- Born: 11 February 2002 (age 24) Hamada, Shimane, Japan

Sport
- Sport: Athletics
- Events: 3000 m steeplechase; 5000 metres; Half marathon

Achievements and titles
- Olympic finals: 2020; 3000 m SC, 7th
- Personal bests: 3000 m S'chase: 8:03.43 (Monaco, 2025) NR
Medal record
Men's athletics
Representing Japan
Asian Games
Gold medal – first place	2026 Aichi–Nagoya	3000 m S'chase

Ryūji Miura (三浦龍司, Miura Ryūji, born 11 February 2002) is a Japanese long-distance runner and steeplechaser. He won the gold medal in the 3000 metres steeplechase at the 2026 Asian Games. He set a new a Japanese national record in 2025, and represented Japan at the 2020 and 2024 Olympic Games.

== Biography ==
A student at Juntendo University, in 2019 as a 17 year old at the Kinki Region High School Track and Field Championships broke the 30-year-old Japanese 3000 m steeplechase high school record by 5 seconds to win in 8:39.49. He missed the 2020 national championship due to injury but prior to that beat Philemon Kiplagat to win the 3000 m at the Hokuren Distance Challenge at Aoba Park Athletic Field, Chitose in 8:19:37, which was the world leading time, and ultimately was the 8th fastest time in the world in 2020, and the second best time ever by a Japanese runner over that distance.

Miura won the 3000 m steeplechase at the Ready Steady Go event at the Olympic Stadium, Tokyo on the 9 May 2021. Miura's winning time of 8:17:46 took more than a second off the national record of 8:18.93 set by Yoshitaka Iwamizu at the 2003 World Championships in Athletics in Paris. It was an Olympic qualifying mark, and well inside his 2020 personal best of 8:19.37. In running this time, he became the first man to break a national record at the new stadium in Tokyo.

On 26 June 2021, Miura set a new national record of 8:15.99 at Yanmar Stadium Nagai, Osaka. He later bested this national record at the 2020 Olympic Games with a time of 8:09.92.

He competed at the 2024 Summer Olympics in Paris in the 3000 metres steeplechase, placing eighth in the final.

In July 2025, he ran a new Japanese national record of 8:03.43 for the 3000 metres steeplechase at the 2025 Herculis. In September 2025, he competed in the 3000 metres steeplechase at the 2025 World Championships in Tokyo, placing eighth overall.

On 28 June 2026, he placed fifth overall in the 3000 metres steeplechase at the 2026 Meeting de Paris. On 10 July, he placed second to Simon Koech in the 3000m steeplechase in 8:10.30 at the 2026 Herculis Diamond League event in Monaco. At the 2026 Diamond League Final in Brussels in September, he placed eighth in the 3000 metres steeplechase. In September, he won the gold medal at the 2026 Asian Games, Japan's first gold medal in 28 years in the men’s 3000 m steeplechase at the Games, also setting a new Asian Games record.

== Personal bests ==
Outdoor

- 1500 metres – 3:36.59 (2022)
- 5000 metres – 13:26.78 (Kitami 2021)
- 3000 metres steeplechase – 8:03.43 (Diamond League, Monaco 2025) NR
- Half marathon – 1:01:41 (Tachikawa 2020)
