= Ryoma Aoki =

Japanese long-distance runner

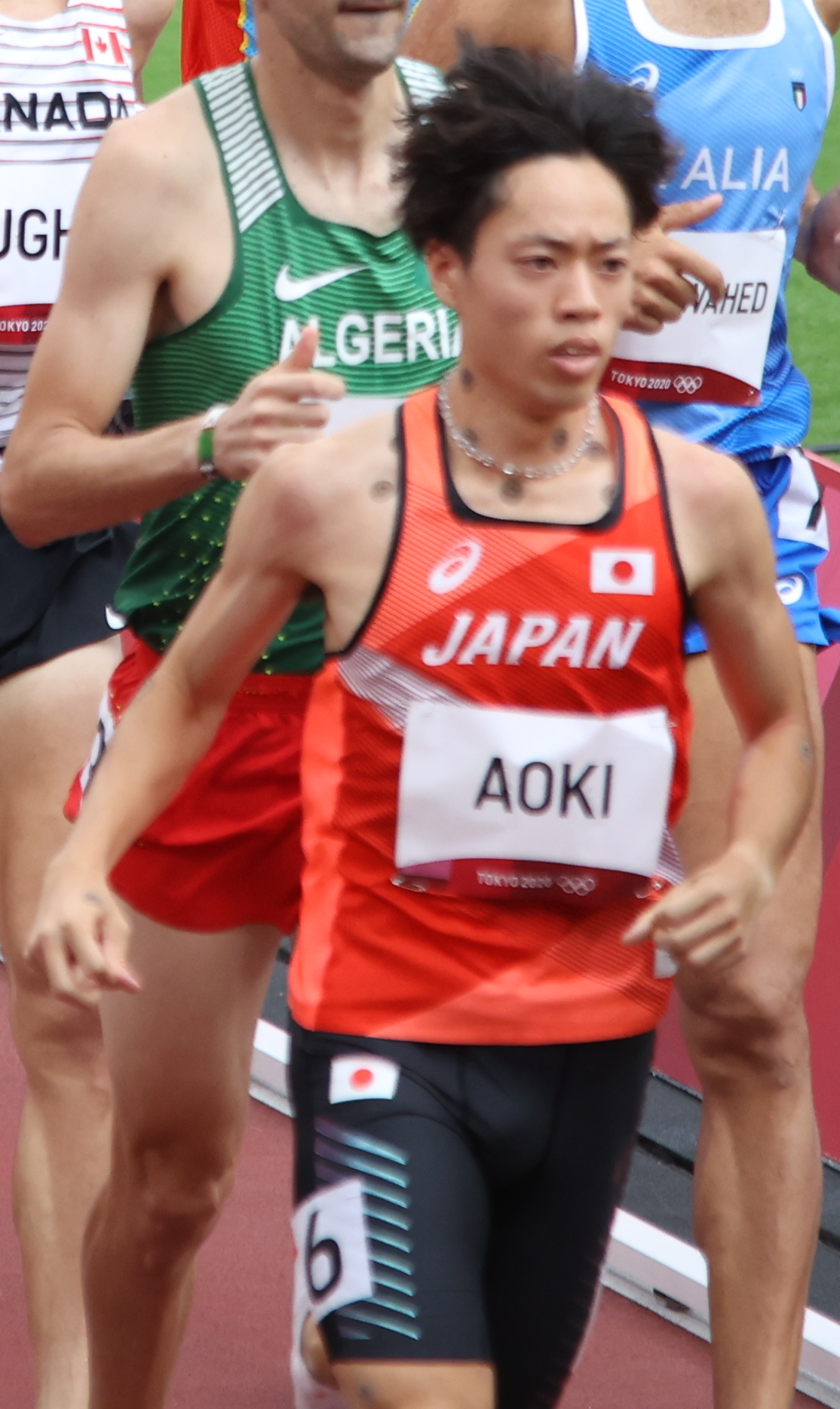
- Aoki at the 2020 Summer Olympics

Personal information
- Born: 16 June 1997 (age 29) Kuki, Saitama, Japan

Sport
- Country: Japan
- Sport: Athletics
- Events: 1500 metres; 3000 m steeplechase; 5000 metres
- Club: Honda Athletics Club
Medal record
Asian Athletics Championships
Gold medal – first place	2023 Bangkok	Steeplechase
Asian Games
Silver medal – second place	2022 Hangzhou	Steeplechase
Silver medal – second place	2026 Aichi–Nagoya	Steeplechase

Ryoma Aoki (青木涼真, Aoki Ryōma, born 16 June 1997) is a Japanese long-distance runner. He competed in the 3000 metres steeplechase at the 2020 Summer Olympics.

== Personal bests ==
Outdoor

- 1500 metres – 3:40.90 (Gifu 2022)
- 5000 metres – 13:26.78 (Osaka 2021)
- 3000 metres steeplechase – 8:20.09 (Osaka 2022)
- Half marathon – 1:04:12 (Yokohama 2017)

Indoor

- 1500 metres – 3:39.12 (Boston 2024) NR
- Mile – 3:54.84 (Boston 2024) NR
- Two miles – 8:25.45 (New York 2024)
