= Yaser Bagharab =

Yemen-born Qatari runner

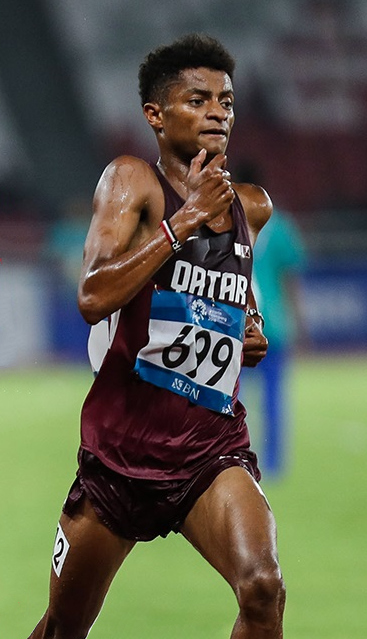
- Bagharab at the 2018 Asian Games

Personal information
- Born: 1 January 1998 (age 28) Yemen
- Height: 170 cm (5 ft 7 in)
- Weight: 70 kg (154 lb)

Sport
- Sport: Athletics
- Event(s): 3000 m steeplechase, 1500–10000 m
- Coached by: Pedro Luiz de Oliveira

Achievements and titles
- Personal best(s): 3000 mS – 8:28.21 (2018); 1500 m – 3:48.73 (2017); 3000 m – 8:03.24 (2018); 5000 m – 14:44.06 (2016); 10000 m – 32:22.42 (2014)
Medal record
Representing Qatar
Asian Games
Silver medal – second place	2018 Jakarta	Steeplechase
Asian Athletics Championships
Silver medal – second place	2017 Bhubaneswar	Steeplechase
Silver medal – second place	2017 Bhubaneswar	5000 m
Asian Indoor Athletics Championships
Silver medal – second place	2018 Tehran	1500 m
Silver medal – second place	2018 Tehran	3000 m

Yaser Salem Bagharab (born 1 January 1998) is a Yemen-born middle and long distance runner. Since 2017 he competes for Qatar, mostly in the 3000 m steeplechase. In this event he won silver medals at the 2017 Asian Championships and 2018 Asian Games.

He represented Yemen in the junior race at the 2015 IAAF World Cross Country Championships.
