= Athletics at the 2026 Asian Games – Women's 400 metres hurdles =

Women's 400 metres hurdles at the 2026 Asian Games
- Venue: Mizuho Park Athletic Stadium, Nagoya
- Dates: 27 September 2026 (round 1); 28 September 2026 (final)
- Competitors: 11 from 8 nations
- Winning time: 54.31 s GR

Medalists
gold medal	Mariam Kareem	United Arab Emirates
silver medal	Adelina Zems	Kazakhstan
bronze medal	Vithya Ramraj	India

The women's 400 metres hurdles competition at the 2026 Asian Games took place on 27 and 28 September 2026 at the Nagoya City Mizuho Park Athletic Stadium in Nagoya, Japan. In total, 11 athletes from eight countries took part in the event.

Mariam Kareem of the United Arab Emirates won the gold medal in a Games record time of 54.31 s. Adelina Zems of Kazakhstan and Vithya Ramraj of India won the silver and bronze medals, respectively. In winning the competition, Kareem also set a new Emirati record for the event. In finishing third, Ramraj set a new Indian record for the event.

== Background ==
The atletics events were held at the Nagoya City Mizuho Park Athletic Stadium in Nagoya, Japan from 23 to 29 September 2026.

Kemi Adekoya of Bahrain was the defending champion after winning the gold medal at the 2022 Asian Games in Hangzhou.

== Round 1 ==
The heats took place on 27 September at 12.35pm. The three fastest athletes from each heat plus the next two fastest advanced to the final. Mariam Kareem set the fastest time (55.14 s) in the first round. Other medal contenders Adelina Zems ran 55.29 s and Vithya Ramraj ran 55.73 s. Honoka Aoki, Anu Raghavan Kong Yingying and also advanced to the final as winners, runners-up and third-placed from their heats. Chung Hsin-Ju and Satsuki Umehara advanced to the final as the next two fastest runners.

=== Heat 1 ===
Place	Lane	Athlete	Nation	Time	Notes
1	5	Adelina Zems	Kazakhstan	55.29	Q, PB
2	7	Vithya Ramraj	India	55.73	Q
3	6	Honoka Aoki	Japan	56.46	Q
4	4	Lauren Hoffman	Philippines	57.94	
5	8	Lo Pei-Lin	Chinese Taipei	58.36	

=== Heat 2 ===
Place	Lane	Athlete	Nation	Time	Notes
1	4	Mariam Kareem	United Arab Emirates	55.14	Q, NR
2	7	Anu Raghavan	India	55.84	Q
3	5	Kong Yingying	China	55.86	Q
4	8	Chung Hsin-Ju	Chinese Taipei	56.57	q, PB
5	6	Satsuki Umehara	Japan	56.59	q
6	3	Ashleigh Ma Ying Wen	Hong Kong	1:03.88	

== Final ==
The final took place on 28 September at 7.23pm. Kareem ran a Games record time 54.31 s to win the gold medal. Zems ran a personal best of 54.58 s to win the silver medal and Ramraj ran an Indian record time of 54.75 to win the bronze medal.

Place	Lane	Athlete	Nation	Time	Notes
1st place, gold medalist(s)	6	Mariam Kareem	United Arab Emirates	54.31	GR, NR
2nd place, silver medalist(s)	7	Adelina Zems	Kazakhstan	54.58	PB
3rd place, bronze medalist(s)	5	Vithya Ramraj	India	54.75	NR
4	4	Kong Yingying	China	55.78	
5	8	Anu Raghavan	India	55.88	PB
6	9	Honoka Aoki	Japan	56.24	
7	2	Chung Hsin-Ju	Chinese Taipei	56.65	
8	3	Satsuki Umehara	Japan	57.90	
