= 2025 Asian Athletics Championships – Women's 400 metres hurdles =

Women's 400 metres hurdles at the 2025 Asian Athletics Championships
- Venue: Gumi Civic Stadium
- Location: Gumi, South Korea
- Dates: 30 May (heats); 31 May (final)
- Competitors: 16 from 12 nations
- Winning time: 55.31

Medalists
gold medal	Mo Jiadie	China
silver medal	Kemi Adekoya	Bahrain
bronze medal	Vithya Ramraj	India

The women's 400 metres hurdles event at the 2025 Asian Athletics Championships was held on 30 and 31 May.

== Records ==
Records before the 2025 Asian Athletics Championships
Record	Athlete (nation)	Time (s)	Location	Date
World record	Sydney McLaughlin (USA)	50.37	Paris, France	8 August 2024
Asian record	Kemi Adekoya (BHR)	53.09	Budapest, Hungary	24 August 2023
Championship record	Kemi Adekoya (BHR)	54.31	Wuhan, China	6 June 2015
World leading	Sydney McLaughlin (USA)	52.07	Miramar, United States	3 May 2025
Asian leading	Mo Jiadie (CHN)	55.52	Zhaoqing, China	12 April 2025

== Schedule ==
The event schedule, in local time (UTC+9), was as follows:

Date	Time	Round
30 May	17:15	Heats
31 May	17:50	Final

== Results ==
=== Heats ===
Held on 30 May. First 3 in each heat (Q) and the next 2 fastest (q) qualified for the final.

==== Heat 1 ====
Place	Lane	Athlete	Nation	Time	Notes
1	4	Kemi Adekoya	Bahrain	56.11	Q, SB
2	5	Vithya Ramraj	India	56.97	Q
3	7	Adelina Zems	Kazakhstan	57.16	Q
4	3	Robyn Lauren Brown	Philippines	57.65	q
5	8	Mariam Kareem	United Arab Emirates	57.66	q, PB
6	6	Ami Yamamoto	Japan	58.40	
7	1	Nurxon Ochilova	Uzbekistan	58.43	PB
8	2	Kim Cho-eun	South Korea	1:02.35	

==== Heat 2 ====
Place	Lane	Athlete	Nation	Time	Notes
1	4	Mo Jiadie	China	56.72	Q
2	6	Quách Thị Lan	Vietnam	57.07	Q
3	3	Anu Raghavan	India	57.48	Q
4	7	Miku Takino	Japan	58.01	
5	6	Lauren Hoffman	Philippines	58.31	
6	8	Rasha Badrani	Lebanon	1:00.39	
7	2	Son Kyeong-mi	South Korea	1:01.44	
8	1	Ashleigh Ma Ying Wen	Hong Kong	1:01.78	

=== Final ===
Place	Lane	Athlete	Nation	Time	Notes
1st place, gold medalist(s)	5	Mo Jiadie	China	55.31	
2nd place, silver medalist(s)	4	Kemi Adekoya	Bahrain	55.32	
3rd place, bronze medalist(s)	6	Vithya Ramraj	India	56.46	
4	3	Adelina Zems	Kazakhstan	56.73	PB
5	1	Robyn Lauren Brown	Philippines	56.98	SB
6	7	Quách Thị Lan	Vietnam	57.04	
7	8	Anu Raghavan	India	57.46	SB
8	2	Mariam Kareem	United Arab Emirates	58.35	
