= 2019 Asian Athletics Championships – Women's 400 metres hurdles =

Women's 400 metres hurdles at the 2019 Asian Athletics Championships
- Venue: Khalifa International Stadium
- Location: Doha, Qatar
- Dates: 21 April (heats); 22 April (final)
- Competitors: 13 from 9 nations
- Winning time: 56.10

Medalists
gold medal	Quách Thị Lan	Vietnam
silver medal	Aminat Yusuf Jamal	Bahrain
bronze medal	Sarita Gayakwad	India

The women's 400 metres hurdles at the 2019 Asian Athletics Championships was held on 21 and 22 April.

== Records ==
Records before the 2019 Asian Athletics Championships
Record	Athlete (nation)	Time (s)	Location	Date
World record	Yuliya Pechonkina (RUS)	52.34	Tula, Russia	22 July 2022
Asian record	Han Qing (CHN)	53.96	Lucerne, Switzerland	9 September 1993
Championship record	Kemi Adekoya (BHR)	54.31	Wuhan, China	6 June 2015
World leading	Tia-Adana Belle (BAR)	54.18	Gainesville, United States	28 March 2019
Asian leading	No times recorded			

== Results ==
=== Heats ===
Qualification rule: First 3 in each heat (Q) and the next 2 fastest (q) qualified for the final.

Rank	Heat	Name	Nationality	Time	Notes
1	1	Aminat Yusuf Jamal	Bahrain	57.49	Q
2	2	Quách Thị Lan	Vietnam	57.64	Q
3	2	Sarita Gayakwad	India	58.17	Q
4	1	Arpitha Manjunatha	India	58.20	Q
5	1	Mo Jiadie	China	58.28	Q
6	2	Huang Yan	China	58.46	Q, SB
7	1	Eri Utsunomiya	Japan	58.68	q
8	1	Adelina Akhmetova	Kazakhstan	59.02	q
9	2	Kristina Pronzhenko	Tajikistan	59.16	NR
10	2	Sayaka Aoki	Japan	59.43	
11	2	Shahla Mahmoudi	Iran	1:00.07	SB
12	2	Kenza Sosse	Qatar	1:09.31	
13	1	Mariam Farid	Qatar	1:10.33	

=== Final ===
Rank	Lane	Name	Nationality	Time	Notes
1st place, gold medalist(s)	4	Quách Thị Lan	Vietnam	56.10	SB
2nd place, silver medalist(s)	5	Aminat Yusuf Jamal	Bahrain	56.39	SB
3rd place, bronze medalist(s)	7	Sarita Gayakwad	India	57.22	
4	2	Eri Utsunomiya	Japan	57.38	
5	3	Adelina Akhmetova	Kazakhstan	57.92	PB
6	6	Arpitha Manjunatha	India	58.15	
7	8	Huang Yan	China	58.29	SB
8	9	Mo Jiadie	China	59.20	
