= Athletics at the 2026 Asian Games – Women's 400 metres =

Women's 400 metres at the 2026 Asian Games
- Venue: Mizuho Park Athletic Stadium, Nagoya
- Dates: 25 September 2026 (round 1); 26 September 2026 (final)
- Competitors: 17 from 14 nations
- Winning time: 49.20 s GR

Medalists
gold medal	Salwa Eid Naser	Bahrain
silver medal	Zahra Zarei Manoujan	Iran
bronze medal	Prachi Choudhary	India

The women's 400 metres competition at the 2026 Asian Games took place from 25 to 26 September 2026 at the Mizuho Park Athletic Stadium in Nagoya, Japan.

== Schedule ==
All times are Japan Standard Time (UTC+09:00)

Schedule
Date	Time	Event
25 September 2026	17:45	Round 1
26 September 2026	18:15	Final

== Records ==
Prior to this competition, the existing world, Asian and Games records were as follows.

World Record	Marita Koch (GDR)	47.60	Canberra, Australia	9 June 1985
Asian Record	Salwa Eid Naser (BHR)	48.14	Doha, Qatar	2 October 2019
Games Record	Salwa Eid Naser (BHR)	50.09	Jakarta, Indonesia	25 August 2018

== Results ==
=== Round 1 ===
First two in each heat (Q) and next two fastest (q) advanced to the final.

==== Heat 1 ====
Place	Lane	Athlete	Nation	Time	Notes
1		Salwa Eid Naser	Bahrain	53.02	Q
2		Nanako Matsumoto	Japan	53.48	Q
3		Alexandra Zalyubovskaya	Kazakhstan	53.93	SB
4		Benny Nontanam	Thailand	54.35	
5		Chen Yi-cen	Chinese Taipei	56.39	

==== Heat 2 ====
Place	Lane	Athlete	Nation	Time	Notes
1		Mariya Shuvalova	Kazakhstan	53.06	Q
2		Kiran Pahal	India	53.44	Q
3		Kim Seo-yoon	South Korea	53.81	q, PB
4		Batbold Solongo	Mongolia	54.91	PB
5		Chow Chi Kiu	Hong Kong	55.80	
6		Levanita da Costa	Timor-Leste	1:03.69	

==== Heat 3 ====
Place	Lane	Athlete	Nation	Time	Notes
1		Zahra Zarei Manoujan	Iran	52.00	Q
2		Jonbibi Hukmova	Uzbekistan	52.05	Q
3		Prachi Choudhary	India	53.46	q
4		Shereen Samson Vallabouy	Malaysia	54.03	
5		Hoang Thi Minh Hanh	Vietnam	54.46	
6		Lee A-young	South Korea	54.74	SB

=== Final ===
Place	Lane	Athlete	Nation	Time	Notes
1st place, gold medalist(s)		Salwa Eid Naser	Bahrain	49.20	GR
2nd place, silver medalist(s)		Zahra Zarei Manoujan	Iran	52.38	
3rd place, bronze medalist(s)		Prachi Choudhary	India	53.21	
4		Kim Seo-yoon	South Korea	53.38	PB
5		Kiran Pahal	India	53.41	
6		Mariya Shuvalova	Kazakhstan	53.59	
7		Nanako Matsumoto	Japan	54.29	
8		Jonbibi Hukmova	Uzbekistan	DNS	
