= Hsiang Chun-hsien =

Taiwanese high jumper

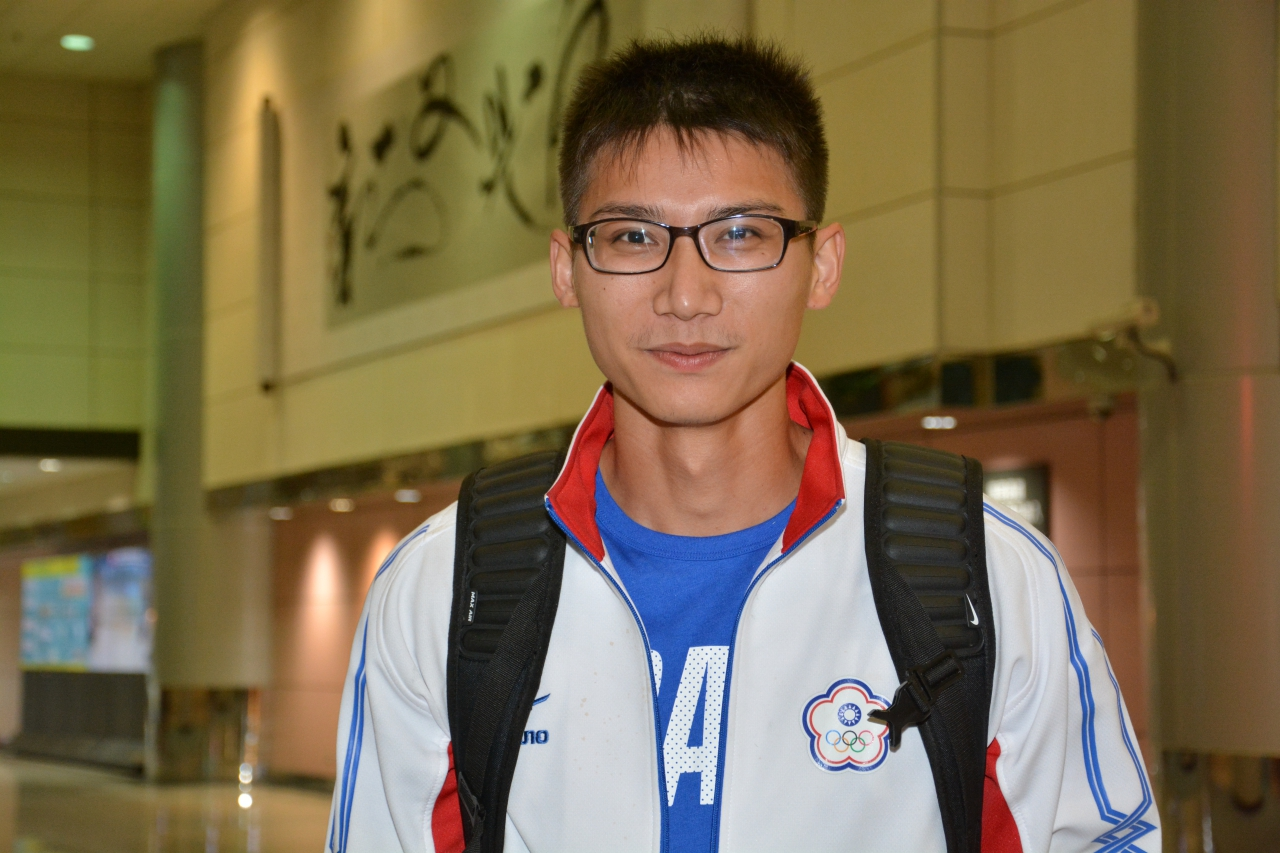
- Hsiang Chun-Hsien in 2015

Personal information
- Born: September 4, 1993 (age 32)
- Height: 1.86 m (6 ft 1 in)
- Weight: 70 kg (150 lb)

Sport
- Country: Chinese Taipei
- Sport: Track and field
- Event: High jump

Hsiang Chun-Hsien (Chinese: 向俊賢; born 4 September 1993) is a Taiwanese athlete specialising in the high jump. He won the silver medal at the 2015 Asian Championships and the bronze at the 2015 Summer Universiade.

His personal bests in the event are 2.28 m (7 ft 5 3/4 in) metres outdoors (Gwangju 2015) and 2.10 m (6 ft 10 1/2 in) metres indoors (Hangzhou 2014). Both are current national records. It bettered his record at Kaohsiung to 2.29, on 21 October 2015.

He studied at the National Taiwan University of Physical Education and Sport.

== Competition record ==
Year	Competition	Venue	Position	Notes
Representing Chinese Taipei
2009	Asian Youth Games	Singapore	9th	2.10 m
2010	Asian Junior Championships	Hanoi, Vietnam	3rd	2.19 m
2010	World Junior Championships	Moncton, Canada	–	NM
2010	Youth Olympic Games	Singapore	6th	2.11 m
2010	Asian Games	Guangzhou, China	15th (q)	2.05 m
2011	Asian Championships	Kobe, Japan	7th	2.18 m
2012	Asian Junior Championships	Colombo, Sri Lanka	3rd	2.16 m
2012	World Junior Championships	Barcelona, Spain	17th (q)	2.14 m
2014	Asian Indoor Championships	Hangzhou, China	9th	2.10 m
2014	Asian Games	Incheon, South Korea	–	NM
2015	Asian Championships	Wuhan, China	2nd	2.24 m
2015	Universiade	Gwangju, South Korea	3rd	2.28 m
2015	World Championships	Beijing, China	32nd (q)	2.22 m
2016	Olympic Games	Rio de Janeiro, Brazil	35th (q)	2.17 m
2017	Asian Championships	Bhubaneswar, India	6th	2.20 m
2017	Universiade	Taipei, Taiwan	3rd	2.26 m
2018	Asian Games	Jakarta, Indonesia	7th (q)	2.15 m^{1}
2019	Asian Championships	Doha, Qatar	12th	2.15 m

^{1}No mark in the final
