= Athletics at the 2026 Asian Games – Women's 4 × 400 metres relay =

Women's 4 × 400 metres relay at the 2026 Asian Games
- Venue: Nagoya City Mizuho Park Athletics Stadium
- Date: 29 September 2026
- Competitors: 36 from 9 nations

Medalists
gold medal	Kiran Pahal; Machettira Poovamma; Prachi Choudhary; Vithya Ramraj	India
silver medal	Aisha Abdullah; Sufian Abdulghani; Zainab Fyofuoba; Salwa Eid Naser	Bahrain
bronze medal	Jiang Yutong; Kong Yingying; Zhou Li; Zuo Siyu	China

The women's 4 × 400 metres relay competition at the 2026 Asian Games took place on 29 September 2026 at the Nagoya City Mizuho Park Athletics Stadium in Nagoya, Japan.

India's Kiran Pahal, Machettira Poovamma, Prachi Choudhary and Vithya Ramraj won the gold medal in 3:29.69. Bahrain took silver in 3:30.21, while China claimed the bronze in 3:31.02.

== Schedule ==
All times are Japan Standard Time (UTC+09:00)

Schedule
Date	Time	Event
Tuesday, 29 September 2026	21:05	Final

== Records ==
Prior to this competition, the existing world, Asian and Games records were as follows.

World Record	Soviet Union	3:15.17	Seoul, South Korea	10 January 1988
Asian Record	China	3:24.28	Beijing, China	13 September 1993
Games Record	Bahrain	3:27.65	Hangzhou, China	4 October 2023

== Results ==
The event was contested as a straight final, with no qualifying rounds.

=== Final ===
Rank	Team	Time	Notes
1st place, gold medalist(s)	India (IND); Kiran Pahal; Machettira Poovamma; Prachi Choudhary; Vithya Ramraj	3:29.69	
2nd place, silver medalist(s)	Bahrain (BRN); Aisha Abdullah; Sufian Abdulghani; Zainab Fyofuoba; Salwa Eid Naser	3:30.21	
3rd place, bronze medalist(s)	China (CHN); Jiang Yutong; Kong Yingying; Zhou Li; Zuo Siyu	3:31.02	
4	Japan (JPN); Aoi Teramoto; Shizuho Moriyama; Nanako Matsumoto; Yuzuki Nakao	3:31.44	
5	Vietnam (VIE); Hoàng Thị Minh Hạnh; Quách Thị Lan; Nguyễn Thị Hằng; Nguyễn Thị Ngọc	3:32.28	
6	Kazakhstan (KAZ); Alexandra Zalyubovskaya; Mariya Shuvalova; Milana Zubareva; Adelina Zems	3:33.76	
7	Sri Lanka (SRI); Nadeesha Ramanayaka; Balapuwaduge Mendis; Araliya Loku; Jithma Ambepitiya	3:34.90	
8	Chinese Taipei (TPE); Hsu Chin-hui; Chen Yi-cen; Lo Pei-lin; Liu Chen-yu	3:41.13	
9	Hong Kong (HKG); Poon Hang-wai; Choi Season; Chow Chi-kiu; Jane Christa Ming Suet Karlsson	3:43.86	
