= 2019 Asian Athletics Championships – Women's 4 × 400 metres relay =

Women's 4 × 400 metres relay at the 2019 Asian Athletics Championships
- Venue: Khalifa International Stadium
- Location: Doha, Qatar
- Dates: 23 April
- Nations: 6
- Winning time: 3:32.10

Medalists
gold medal	Aminat Yusuf Jamal; Iman Essa Jassim; Zainab Mohammed; Salwa Eid Naser	Bahrain
silver medal	Prachi Choudhary; M. R. Poovamma; Sarita Gayakwad; V. K. Vismaya	India
bronze medal	Mae Hirosawa; Seika Aoyama; Konomi Takeishi; Yuna Iwata	Japan

The women's 4 × 400 metres relay event at the 2019 Asian Athletics Championships was held on 24 April.

== Results ==
Rank	Team	Name	Time	Notes
1st place, gold medalist(s)	Bahrain	Aminat Yusuf Jamal, Iman Essa Jassim, Zainab Mohammed, Salwa Eid Naser	3:32.10	SB
2nd place, silver medalist(s)	India	Prachi Choudhary, M. R. Poovamma, Sarita Gayakwad, V. K. Vismaya	3:32.21	SB
3rd place, bronze medalist(s)	Japan	Mae Hirosawa, Seika Aoyama, Konomi Takeishi, Yuna Iwata	3:34.88	SB
4	Sri Lanka	Nadeesha Ramanayaka, Shyamali Kumarasingha, Egodaha Walaww, Nimali Waliwarsha	3:35.06	NR
5	Vietnam	Nguyễn Thị Oanh, Nguyễn Thị Hằng, Hoàng Thị Ngọc, Quách Thị Lan	3:37.27	SB
6	China	Huang Jiaxin, Pan Gaoqin, Li Xue, Fu Na	3:37.97	SB
	Kuwait		DNS	
