= 2019 Asian Athletics Championships – Men's high jump =

Men's high jump at the 2019 Asian Athletics Championships
- Venue: Khalifa International Stadium
- Location: Doha, Qatar
- Dates: 22 April (qualification); 24 April (final)
- Competitors: 21 from 17 nations
- Winning height: 2.31 m

Medalists
gold medal	Majd Eddin Ghazal	Syria
silver medal	Takashi Eto	Japan
bronze medal	Naoto Tobe	Japan

The men's high jump at the 2019 Asian Athletics Championships was held on 22 and 24 April.

== Records ==
Records before the 2019 Asian Athletics Championships
Record	Athlete (nation)	Height (m)	Location	Date
World record	Javier Sotomayor (CUB)	2.45	Salamanca, Spain	27 July 1993
Asian record	Mutaz Barsham (QAT)	2.43	Brussels, Belgium	5 September 2014
Championship record	Mutaz Barsham (QAT)	2.35	Kobe, Japan	9 July 2011
World leading	Naoto Tobe (JPN)	2.35	Karlsruhe, Germany	2 February 2019
Asian leading	Naoto Tobe (JPN)	2.35	Karlsruhe, Germany	2 February 2019

== Results ==
=== Qualification ===
Qualification rule: Qualifying performance 2.22 (Q) or at least 12 best performers (q) qualify for the final

Rank	Group	Name	Nationality	1.90	2.00	2.05	2.10	2.13	2.16	Result	Notes
1	A	Takashi Eto	Japan	–	–	–	–	o	o	2.16	q
1	A	Majd Eddin Ghazal	Syria	–	–	–	o	–	o	2.16	q
1	B	Hussein Falah Al-Ibraheemi	Iraq	–	o	o	o	o	o	2.16	q
1	B	Keyvan Ghanbarzadeh	Iran	–	–	–	o	o	o	2.16	q
1	B	Nauraj Singh Randhawa	Malaysia	–	–	–	o	o	o	2.16	q
1	B	Sun Zhao	China	–	–	o	o	–	o	2.16	q, SB
7	A	Lee Hup Wei	Malaysia	–	–	o	o	o	xo	2.16	q
7	B	Naoto Tobe	Japan	–	–	–	–	o	xo	2.16	q
9	A	Chen Long	China	–	o	o	o	–	xxo	2.16	q
9	A	Hsiang Chun-hsien	Chinese Taipei	–	–	–	o	–	xxo	2.16	q
9	B	Mahmat Hamdi	Qatar	–	–	o	o	o	xxo	2.16	q, SB
9	B	Woo Sang-hyeok	South Korea	–	–	–	–	o	xxo	2.16	q
13	A	Nuh Andu	Qatar	–	o	o	o	o	xxx	2.13	
14	B	Kam Kampton	Singapore	–	o	o	xxo	–	xxx	2.10	=SB
15	A	Cao Vo Ngoc Long	Vietnam	–	o	xo	xxx			2.05	
16	A	Anton Bodnar	Kazakhstan	–	o	x–	xx			2.00	
16	B	Khaled Al-Mesaad	Kuwait	o	o	xxx				2.00	SB
18	A	Sharoz Khan	Pakistan	–	xo	xxx				2.00	SB
18	B	Fatak Bait Jaboob	Oman	o	xo	xxx				2.00	=PB
20	A	Mohammad Al-Buheiri	Jordan	o	xxo	xxx				2.00	SB
21	A	Wong Chi Wai	Macau	o	xxx					1.90	

=== Final ===
Rank	Name	Nationality	2.05	2.10	2.15	2.19	2.23	2.26	2.29	2.31	2.35	2.37	Result	Notes
1st place, gold medalist(s)	Majd Eddin Ghazal	Syria	–	–	o	o	o	xxo	o	o	xx–	x	2.31	WL
2nd place, silver medalist(s)	Takashi Eto	Japan	–	–	o	o	xxo	xxo	xxo	xxx			2.29	
3rd place, bronze medalist(s)	Naoto Tobe	Japan	–	–	o	o	xo	o	xxx				2.26	
4	Lee Hup Wei	Malaysia	–	o	o	o	o	xxo	xxx				2.26	
5	Sun Zhao	China	–	o	o	o	o	xxx					2.23	SB
6	Nauraj Singh Randhawa	Malaysia	–	o	o	xo	xo	xxx					2.23	SB
7	Mahmat Hamdi	Qatar	–	o	xo	o	xxx						2.19	SB
7	Woo Sang-hyeok	South Korea	–	o	xo	o	xxx						2.19	
9	Hussein Falah Al-Ibraheemi	Iraq	o	o	o	xxo	xxx						2.19	=NR
10	Chen Long	China	o	o	xo	xxo	xxx						2.19	
11	Keyvan Ghanbarzadeh	Iran	–	o	o	xxx							2.15	
12	Hsiang Chun-hsien	Chinese Taipei	–	o	xo	xxx							2.15	
