= Athletics at the 2022 Asian Games – Women's 400 metres hurdles =

Women's 400 metres hurdles at the 2022 Asian Games
- Venue: Hangzhou Olympic Expo Main Stadium
- Date: 2–3 October 2023
- Competitors: 11 from 8 nations

Medalists
gold medal	Kemi Adekoya	Bahrain
silver medal	Mo Jiadie	China
bronze medal	Vithya Ramraj	India

The women's 400 metres hurdles competition at the 2022 Asian Games took place on 2 and 3 October 2023 at the HOC Stadium, Hangzhou.

== Schedule ==
All times are China Standard Time (UTC+08:00)

Date	Time	Event
Monday, 2 October 2023	10:40	Round 1
Tuesday, 3 October 2023	19:20	Final

== Records ==
Prior to this competition, the existing world, Asian and Games records were as follows.

World Record	Sydney McLaughlin (USA)	50.68	Eugene, United States	22 July 2022
Asian Record	Kemi Adekoya (BRN)	53.09	Budapest, Hungary	24 August 2023
Games Record	Kemi Adekoya (BRN)	55.09	Incheon, South Korea	30 September 2014

== Results ==
=== Round 1 ===
- Qualification: First 3 in each heat (Q) and the next 2 fastest (q) advance to the final.

==== Heat 1 ====
Rank	Athlete	Time	Notes
1	Vithya Ramraj (IND)	55.42	Q
2	Aminat Yusuf Jamal (BRN)	56.22	Q
3	Adelina Zems (KAZ)	57.16	Q
4	Ami Yamamoto (JPN)	57.55	q
5	Robyn Lauren Brown (PHI)	58.34	q
6	Kristina Pronzhenko (TJK)	1:03.16	

==== Heat 2 ====
Rank	Athlete	Time	Notes
1	Kemi Adekoya (BRN)	55.17	Q
2	Lauren Hoffman (PHI)	57.61	Q
3	Mo Jiadie (CHN)	58.09	Q
4	Nguyễn Thị Huyền (VIE)	58.49	
5	Sinchal Kaveramma (IND)	58.62	

=== Final ===
Rank	Athlete	Time	Notes
1st place, gold medalist(s)	Kemi Adekoya (BRN)	54.45	GR
2nd place, silver medalist(s)	Mo Jiadie (CHN)	55.01	
3rd place, bronze medalist(s)	Vithya Ramraj (IND)	55.68	
4	Aminat Yusuf Jamal (BRN)	56.84	
5	Lauren Hoffman (PHI)	57.21	
6	Robyn Lauren Brown (PHI)	57.55	
7	Ami Yamamoto (JPN)	57.66	
8	Adelina Zems (KAZ)	1:00.27	
