= List of Emirati records in athletics =

The following are the national records in athletics in the United Arab Emirates maintained by UAE Athletics Federation.

== Outdoor ==
Key to tables: Awaiting ratification Record not kept by UAE Athletics Federation Not ratified or later rescinded by UAE Athletics Federation

# = not ratified by federation or/and IAAF

=== Men ===
Event	Record	Athlete	Date	Meet	Place	Ref.
100 m	10.30 (NWI)	Neseib Salmein Al-Zaabi	25 May 2017		Dubai, United Arab Emirates	
100 m	10.17 (+0.9 m/s)	Naseib Salmein	5 June 2015		Dubai, United Arab Emirates	
200 m	20.63 (+1.0 m/s)	Omar Jouma Al-Salfa	24 November 2010	Asian Games	Guangzhou, China	
400 m	44.85	Suleiman Abdulrahman	29 May 2026	Asian U20 Championships	Hong Kong, China	
800 m	1:48.86	Saud Abdul Karim	20 September 2010	West Asian Championships	Aleppo, Syria	
1500 m	3:47.06	Mohamed Al-Nahdi	19 August 1992		Dortmund, Germany	
1500 m	3:38.27	Abdulkerim Teki Abdurahman (Note: listed as for UAE, but change of nationality from ETH to UAE not confirmed)	3 May 2024	International Grand Prix Meeting	Dubai, United Arab Emirates	
3000 m	8:13.88	Mohamed Al-Nahdi	3 July 1992		Betzdorf, Germany	
5000 m	13:49.74	Mohamed Al-Nahdi	4 December 1993	Asian Championships	Manila, Philippines	
5 km (road)	16:04	Saleh Alsuwaidi	6 December 2019	ADNOC Abu Dhabi 5km	Abu Dhabi, United Arab Emirates	
10,000 m	30:04.1 h	Mohamed Al-Nahdi	8 August 1997		Västerås, Sweden	
10 km (road)	30:00	Mubarak Rashid Al-Marashda	6 December 2019	ADNOC Abu Dhabi 10km	Abu Dhabi, United Arab Emirates	
10 km (road)	29:46 (Note: unconfirmed distance, probably short course)	Mubarak Rashid Al-Marashda	7 April 2023	NAS Sports Tournament 10K	Dubai, United Arab Emirates	
Half marathon	1:05:52	Mubarak Rashid Al-Marashda	8 February 2019	Ras Al Khaimah Half Marathon	Ras Al Khaimah, United Arab Emirates	
Marathon	2:23:42	Jassim Abbas Ali	11 January 2002	Dubai Marathon	Dubai, United Arab Emirates	
110 m hurdles	14.42 (NWI)	Mohamed Youseff Hamadi	9 April 2003		Doha, Qatar	
400 m hurdles	49.66	Hassan Ali Obaid Shirook	30 April 2009		Qatif, Saudi Arabia	
400 m hurdles	49.66	Hassan Ali Obaid Shirook	26 July 2009		Zeulenroda, Germany	
3000 m steeplechase	8:35.64	Mohamed Al-Nahdi	4 August 1993		Hamburg, Germany	
High jump	2.16 m	Abdullah Mohammad Abbas Derouiche	8 December 2005	West Asian Games	Doha, Qatar	
High jump	2.16 m	Sayed Abbas Al-Alaoui	29 June 2012		Iława, Poland	
High jump	2.16 m	Sayed Abbas Al-Alaoui	10 April 2013	Gulf Countries Championships	Doha, Qatar	
Pole vault	4.70 m	Abdullah Mohammad Abbas Derouiche	11 March 2004		Dubai, United Arab Emirates	
Pole vault	4.70 m	Abdullah Mohammad Abbas Derouiche	9/10 May 2008		Abu Dhabi, United Arab Emirates	
Long jump	7.79 m (NWI)	Mousbeh Ali Said	6 September 1992		Latakia, Syria	
Triple jump	16.80 m (±0.0 m/s)	Mohamed Abbas Darwish	20 September 2010	West Asian Championships	Aleppo, Syria	
Shot put	17.52 m	Ahmed Ali Hassan Mohamed	12 December 2012		Dubai, United Arab Emirates	
Discus throw	56.26 m	Adel Saber Salem Baiha	22 October 1999		Beirut, Lebanon	
Hammer throw	65.44 m	Mohamed Omar Al-Khatib	26 May 2017		Dubai, United Arab Emirates	
Javelin throw	65.26 m	Said Salem Saber Baiha	19 June 1999		Meknes, Morocco	
Decathlon	6596 pts	Ibrahim Nasser Al-Matrooshi	7–8 April 1994		Doha, Qatar	
Decathlon	100m (wind) / Long jump (wind) / Shot put / High jump / 400m / 110m H (wind) / Discus / Pole vault / Javelin / 1500m; 11.28 / 6.51 m / 10.40 m / 1.90 m / 50.29 / 15.37 / 33.74 m / 4.50 m / 48.46 m / 5:29.47					
Decathlon	6596 pts	Abdullah Mohammed Abbas Derouiche	4–5 October 2004	Pan Arab Games	Algiers, Algeria	
Decathlon	100m (wind) / Long jump (wind) / Shot put / High jump / 400m / 110m H (wind) / Discus / Pole vault / Javelin / 1500m; 11.72 / 6.57 m / 10.58 m / 2.07 m / 51.59 / 15.35 / 26.25 m / 4.60 m / 45.03 m / 5:03.42					
10,000 m walk (track)	47:39.8 h	Ayoub Mohamed Serwash	17 April 2010		Dubai, United Arab Emirates	
10 km walk (road)	48:15+	Ayoob Mohd Sarwashi	21 November 2010	Asian Games	Guangzhou, China	
20 km walk (road)	1:36:41	Ayoob Mohd Sarwashi	21 November 2010	Asian Games	Guangzhou, China	
50 km walk (road)						
4 × 100 m relay	39.85	United Arab Emirates; Ahmed S. Al-Saabi; Bilal Jouma Al-Salfa; Hussain Ghuloum; Omar Jouma Al-Salfa	28 October 2011	Pan Arabic Championships	Al-Ain, United Arab Emirates	
4 × 400 m relay	3:09.21	United Arab Emirates; Hassan Ali Obaid Shirook; J.S. Juma; S. Abdelkarim; H.H. Khamis	1 May 2009		Qatif, Saudi Arabia	

=== Women ===
Event	Record	Athlete	Date	Meet	Place	Ref.
100 m	11.61 (−0.4 m/s)	Arwa Ali	5 September 2026	Oman Athletics Grand Prix	Muscat, Oman	
200 m	23.33 (−0.1 m/s)	Aminat Kamarudeen	5 September 2026	Oman Athletics Grand Prix	Muscat, Oman	
400 m	52.15	Mariam Kareem	5 September 2026	Oman Athletics Grand Prix	Muscat, Oman	
800 m	2:06.81	Betlhem Desalegn	5 August 2013		Sollentuna, Sweden	
1500 m	4:03.70	Betlhem Desalegn	18 May 2016	IAAF World Challenge Beijing	Beijing, China	
3000 m	8:54.32	Betlhem Desalegn	8 September 2015	Hanžeković Memorial	Zagreb, Croatia	
3000 m	8:53.75	Betlhem Desalegn	30 July 2015	Stockholm Bauhaus Athletics	Stockholm, Sweden	
5000 m	15:00.45	Alia Saeed Mohammed	18 May 2017	Islamic Solidarity Games	Baku, Azerbaijan	
5 km (road)	15:38	Alia Saeed Mohammed	11 November 2011		Dubai, United Arab Emirates	
10,000 m	31:10.25	Alia Saeed Mohammed	23 April 2016	President's Cup	Dubai, United Arab Emirates	
10 km (road)	31:36+	Alia Saeed Mohammed	28 October 2018	Valencia Half Marathon	Valencia, Spain	
15 km (road)	47:18+	Alia Saeed Mohammed	28 October 2018	Valencia Half Marathon	Valencia, Spain	
20 km (road)	1:02:53+	Alia Saeed Mohammed	28 October 2018	Valencia Half Marathon	Valencia, Spain	
Half marathon	1:06:13	Alia Saeed Mohammed	28 October 2018	Valencia Half Marathon	Valencia, Spain	
25 km (road)	2:12:34+	Batoul Al-Naqbi	12 February 2023	Dubai Marathon	Dubai, United Arab Emirates	
30 km (road)	2:40:06+	Batoul Al-Naqbi	12 February 2023	Dubai Marathon	Dubai, United Arab Emirates	
Marathon	2:27:08	Alia Saeed Mohammed	23 April 2016	Seville Marathon	Seville, Spain	
100 m hurdles	14.04 (±0.0 m/s)	Mariam Kareem	3 October 2025	3rd West Asia U20 Athletics Championship	Beirut, Lebanon	
300 m hurdles	40.20	Mariam Kareem	18 July 2026	Night of Athletics	Heusden-Zolder, Belgium	
400 m hurdles	54.31	Mariam Kareem	28 September 2026	Asian Games	Nagoya, Japan	
3000 m steeplechase	10:48.06	Halima Salem Ali	28 October 2011		Al Ain, United Arab Emirates	
3000 m steeplechase	9:53.19	Betlhem Desalegn	21 August 2014	DN Galan	Stockholm, Sweden	
High jump	1.59 m	Alia Youssef Al-Hammadi	15 March 2015	4th GCC Women's Games	Muscat, Oman	
Pole vault						
Long jump	5.34 m (+1.2 m/s)	Latifa Al-Kaabi	16 May 2022	GCC Games	Kuwait City, Kuwait	
Triple jump	11.30 m (+2.0 m/s)	Latifa Al-Kaabi	17 May 2022	GCC Games	Kuwait City, Kuwait	
Shot put	13.13 m	Fatima Youssef Al-Hosani	17 May 2026	GCC Games	Doha, Qatar	
Discus throw	48.44 m	Fatima Youssef Al-Hosani	5 September 2026	Oman Athletics Grand Prix	Muscat, Oman	
Hammer throw	58.96 m	Salma Haitham Rashed Saeed Almarri	7 August 2026	World Athletics U20 Championships	Eugene, United States	
Javelin throw	31.67 m	Saeeda Khamis Al-Nasaoui	9 March 2013	3rd GCC Women's Games	Manama, Bahrain	
Heptathlon	2613 pts (NWI)	Muhra Jassem Abdullah	12–13 December 2012		Dubai, United Arab Emirates	
Heptathlon	100m H (wind) / High jump / Shot put / 200m (wind) / Long jump (wind) / Javelin / 800m; 19.13 (NWI) / 1.38 m / 6.78 m / 29.62 (NWI) / 4.28 m (NWI) / – / 2:42.90					
10 km walk (road)	1:10:16	Munira Al-Balooshi	21 May 2013		Doha, Qatar	
20 km walk (road)						
50 km walk (road)						
4 × 100 m relay	45.86	United Arab Emirates; Laila Safeenah Ahmed; Arwa Ali; Ezza Nael Nasser; Aisha Muhammed	31 May 2026	Asian U20 Championships	Kowloon, Hong Kong	
4 × 400 m relay	3:46.71	United Arab Emirates; Ezza Nael Nasser; Maryam Karim; Ycha Tarek; Aminat Kamarudeen	3 October 2025	3rd West Asia U20 Athletics Championship	Beirut, Lebanon	

=== Mixed ===
Event	Record	Athlete	Date	Meet	Place	Ref.
4 × 400 m relay	3:17.00	United Arab Emirates; Suleiman Abdulrahman; Aminat Kamarudeen; Emmanuel Bamidele; Mariam Kareem	24 September 2026	Asian Games	Nagoya, Japan	

== Indoor ==
=== Men ===
Event	Record	Athlete	Date	Meet	Place	Ref.
60 m	6.72	Omar Juma Al-Salfa	31 October 2009	Asian Indoor Games	Hanoi, Vietnam	
200 m	22.21	Anik Dole	10 February 2024	BU David Hemery Valentine Invitational	Boston, United States	
200 m	21.96	Anik Dole	25 February 2024	New England Division III Championships	Boston, United States	
400 m	48.24	Ali Obaid Hassan Shirook	15 February 2008		Doha, Qatar	
800 m	1:51.68	Hassan Mayouf	20 September 2017	Asian Indoor and Martial Arts Games	Ashgabat, Turkmenistan	
800 m	1:49.33	Saeed Basweidan	27 February 1999		Blacksburg, United States	
1500 m	3:54.77	Saud Al-Zaabi	12 February 2019	Czech Indoor Gala	Ostrava, Czech Republic	
3000 m						
60 m hurdles						
High jump	2.08 m	Sayed Abbas Al-Alaoui	25 February 2010	Asian Indoor Championships	Tehran, Iran	
Pole vault						
Long jump	5.62 m	Mohamed Al-Maadi	25 February 2018		Minsk, Belarus	
Triple jump	16.03 m	Mohammad Abd. Abbas Darwish	2 November 2009	Asian Indoor Games	Hanoi, Vietnam	
Shot put	16.45 m	Rashid Saif Al-Maqbali	16 February 2008		Doha, Qatar	
Heptathlon						
Heptathlon	60m / Long jump / Shot put / High jump / 60m H / Pole vault / 1000m					
5000 m walk						
4 × 400 m relay	3:11.40	United Arab Emirates; Omar Juma Al-Salfa; Hassan Ali Obaid Shirook; Ali; J.S. Juma	2 November 2009	Asian Indoor Games	Hanoi, Vietnam	

=== Women ===
Event	Record	Athlete	Date	Meet	Place	Ref.
60 m						
200 m	27.89	Fatima Ali Hassan Aabdula Alblooshi	14 January 2023	Baku Championships	Baku, Azerbaijan	
400 m						
800 m						
1500 m	4:05.61	Betlhem Desalegn	19 February 2015	XL Galan	Stockholm, Sweden	
3000 m	8:44.59	Betlhem Desalegn	20 February 2016	Asian Championships	Doha, Qatar	
5000 m	15:34.70	Alia Saeed Mohammed	19 February 2015	XL Galan	Stockholm, Sweden	
60 m hurdles						
High jump						
Pole vault						
Long jump						
Triple jump						
Shot put						
Pentathlon						
Pentathlon	60m H / High jump / Shot put / Long jump / 800m					
3000 m walk						
4 × 400 m relay						
