= Takashi Eto =

Japanese high jumper (born 1991)

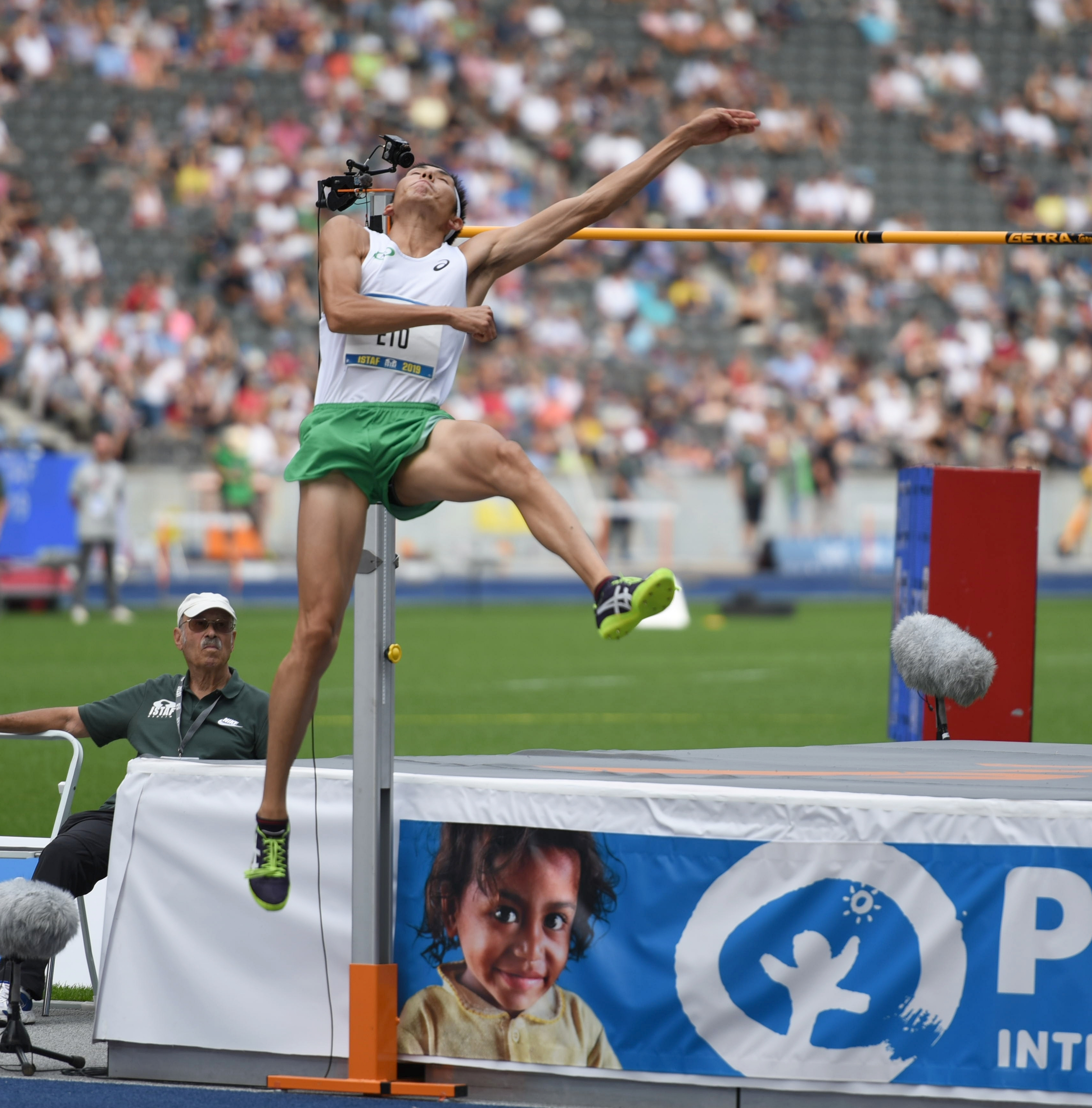

Personal information
- Born: 5 February 1991 (age 35)
- Height: 1.83 m (6 ft 0 in)
- Weight: 67 kg (148 lb)

Sport
- Country: Japan
- Sport: Track and field
- Event: High jump
Medal record
Asian Athletics Championships
Gold medal – first place	2015 Wuhan	High jump
Silver medal – second place	2019 Doha	High jump

Takashi Etō (Japanese: 衛藤 昂; born 5 February 1991) is a Japanese track and field athlete who competes in the high jump. His personal best is 2.30 m (7 ft 6 1/2 in), set in 2014. He won the gold medal in the event at the Asian Athletics Championships in 2015. He represented Japan at the 2014 Asian Games and was national champion that year.

== Career ==
Born in Mie Prefecture, he competed in the high jump as a teenager and began to make progress at national level in 2008, winning the national junior games and placing in the top three at the national junior championships. The year after he began attending the University of Tsukuba and continued with the sport, placing fifth at the Japan Championships in Athletics and setting a best of 2.19 m (7 ft 2 in) at the Japanese university championships. He gained his first international selection at the 2010 World Junior Championships in Athletics, but did not get past the qualifiers or improve upon his best.

He edged towards the top of the national scene at the 2011 Japanese Championships, placing second to Naoto Tobe, and cleared two metres and twenty for the first time that season, ending with a best of 2.24 m (7 ft 4 in). As a consequence of this performance he was chosen to compete at the 2011 Asian Athletics Championships held in Kobe and out did Tobe by having a personal best of 2.24 m (7 ft 4 in) to place fourth. Eto was beaten at national level by Hiromi Takahari at the 2012 Japan Championships and finished down in ninth place at that year's Japanese National Games. Eto and Takahari repeated their placings at the 2013 Japan Championships and he was again behind Takahari at the 2013 Asian Athletics Championships, coming seventh. He had a late season resurgence, however, setting a personal best of 2.27 m (7 ft 5 1/4 in) to win the National Sports Festival title. This ranked him in the world top fifty in the seasonal rankings for the first time, and the fifth best Asian man.

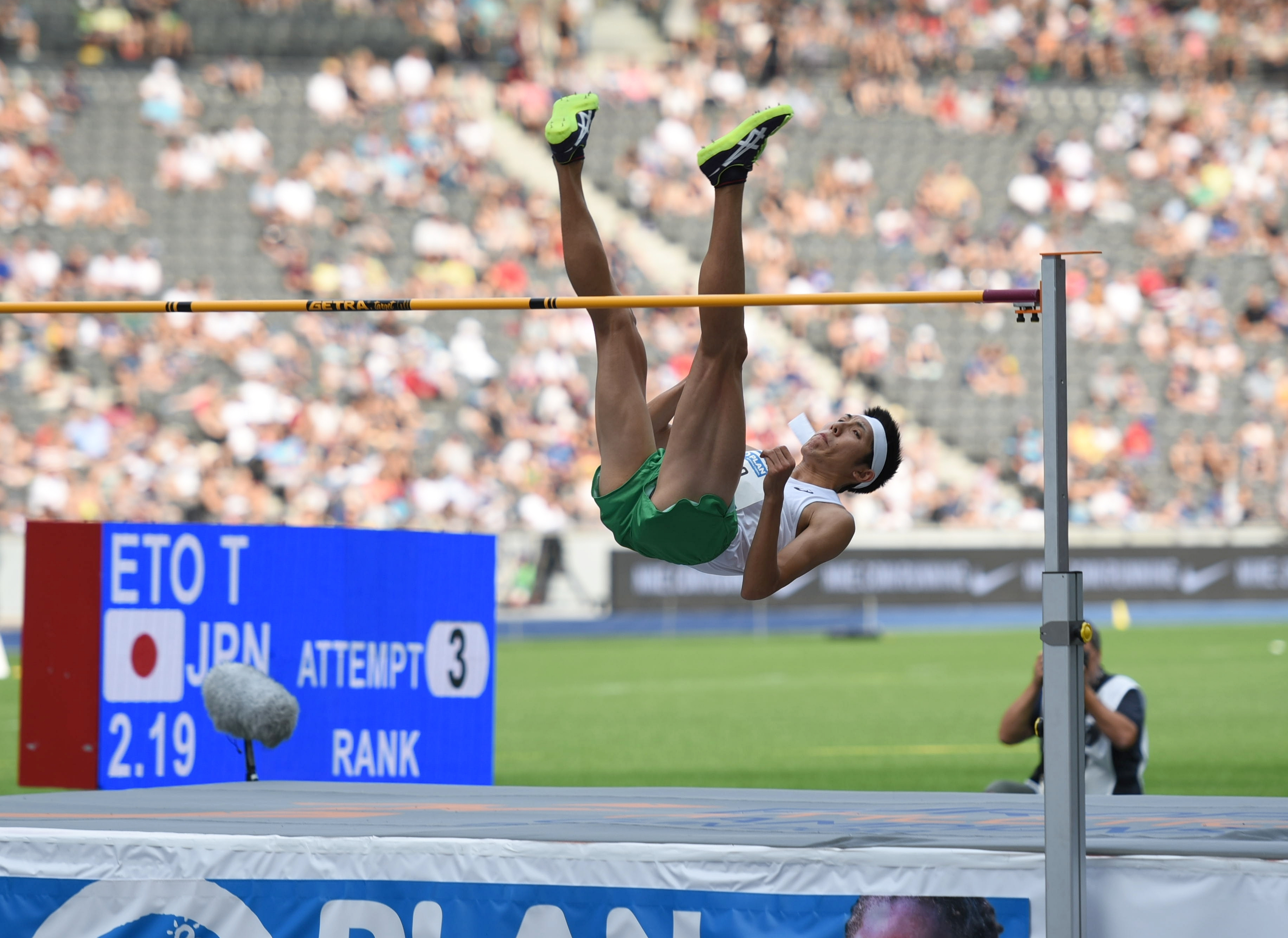
Eto after a successful jump in 2019

Eto set a new best of 2.28 m (7 ft 5 3/4 in) at the Golden Grand Prix in Tokyo in 2014, moving him to a new high of 26th on the world yearly lists. His first national title followed at the Japan Championships in June, but by the time of the Asian Games in September, he could only manage a jump of 2.15 m (7 ft 1/2 in) for eleventh place. He was also down at national level, coming third at the National Games. He was again strong in the early season of 2015, twice equalling his best to win at the Shizuoka International and place third at the Golden Grand Prix (behind Bogdan Bondarenko and Zhang Guowei). He did not reach such heights at the 2015 Asian Athletics Championships, but his jump of 2.24 m (7 ft 4 in) in the rain of Wuhan was still enough to win a gold medal for Japan – world leader Mutaz Essa Barshim surprised by finishing in third, some twenty centimetres off his best. He was the first Japanese man to win an Asian Championships high jump title since Shuji Ujino in 1985.

== National titles ==
- Japan Championships in Athletics
  - High jump: 2014
  - HJ: 2016 (2.29m, PB)

== International competitions ==
Year	Competition	Venue	Position	Notes
2010	World Junior Championships	Moncton, Canada	27th (q)	2.05 m
2011	Asian Championships	Kobe, Japan	4th	2.24 m
2013	Asian Championships	Pune, India	7th	2.18 m
2014	Asian Games	Incheon, South Korea	11th	2.15 m
2015	Asian Championships	Wuhan, China	1st	2.24 m
2015	World Championships	Beijing, China	28th (q)	2.22 m
2016	Olympic Games	Rio de Janeiro, Brazil	35th (q)	2.17 m
2017	World Championships	London, United Kingdom	22nd (q)	2.22 m
2018	Asian Games	Jakarta, Indonesia	6th	2.24 m
2019	Asian Championships	Doha, Qatar	2nd	2.29 m
2019	World Championships	Doha, Qatar	25th (q)	2.17 m
2021	Olympic Games	Tokyo, Japan	17th (q)	2.21 m
