= Sarita Gayakwad =

Indian sprinter

Personal information
- Full name: Saritaben Laxmanbhai Gayakwad
- Born: 1 June 1994 (age 32) Kharadi Amba, Dang District, India
- Height: 168 cm (5 ft 6 in)
- Weight: 58 kg (128 lb)

Sport
- Sport: Track and field
- Event(s): 400 metres, 400 metres hurdles
- Coached by: KS Ajimon

Achievements and titles
- Personal best(s): 400 m – 53.24 (2018); 400 mH – 57.04 (2018)
Medal record
Representing India
Asian Games
Gold medal – first place	2018 Jakarta	Women's 4×400 m
Asian Championships
Silver medal – second place	2019 Doha	Women's 4×400 m
Bronze medal – third place	2019 Doha	400 m hurdles

Saritaben Laxmanbhai Gayakwad (born 1 June 1994) is an Indian sprinter who specializes in the 400 metres and 400 metres hurdles. She was part of the Indian women's 4 × 400 metres relay team that won the gold medal at the 2018 Asian Games.

Gujarat Govt. has selected her as a brand ambassador of Gujarat State Poshan Abhiyan.

== Early life ==
Gayakwad was born on 1 June 1994 in a tribal family in Kharadi Amba village, Dang District, Gujarat. She represented her state in national level kho kho competitions till 2010, before making the switch to sprinting. As of 2018, she works as an income tax official.

== Career ==
Gayakwad was selected in the Indian women's 4 × 400 metres relay team for the 2018 Commonwealth Games in Australia. She thus became the first track and field athlete from the state to be selected for the Commonwealth Games. The team came seventh in the final with a timing of 3:33.61. She was then selected for the 2018 Asian Games in the women's 4 × 400 metres relay team. The quartet of Gayakwad, M. R. Poovamma, Hima Das and V. K. Vismaya clocked 3:28.72 in the final to clinch the gold medal.
