= 2019 Asian Athletics Championships – Mixed 4 × 400 metres relay =

International athletics sporting competition

Mixed 4 × 400 metres relay at the 2019 Asian Athletics Championships
- Venue: Khalifa International Stadium
- Location: Doha, Qatar
- Dates: 23 April
- Nations: 6
- Winning time: 3:15.75

Medalists
gold medal	Musa Isah (M); Aminat Yusuf Jamal (W); Salwa Eid Naser (W); Abbas Abubakar Abbas (M)	Bahrain
silver medal	Mohammad Anas (M); M. R. Poovamma (W); Vismaya Velluvakoroth (W); Arokia Rajiv (M)	India
bronze medal	Kota Wakabayashi (M); Konomi Takeishi (W); Mayu Inaoka (W); Kentaro Sato (M)	Japan

The mixed 4 × 400 metres relay event at the 2019 Asian Athletics Championships was held on 23 April.

== Results ==
Rank	Team	Name	Time	Notes
1st place, gold medalist(s)	Bahrain	Musa Isah (M), Aminat Yusuf Jamal (W), Salwa Eid Naser (W), Abbas Abubakar Abbas (M)	3:15.75	
2nd place, silver medalist(s)	India	Mohammad Anas (M), M. R. Poovamma (W), Vismaya Velluvakoroth (W), Arokia Rajiv (M)	3:16.47	
3rd place, bronze medalist(s)	Japan	Kota Wakabayashi (M), Konomi Takeishi (W), Mayu Inaoka (W), Kentaro Sato (M)	3:20.29	
4	Kazakhstan	Svetlana Golendova (W), Andrey Sokolov (M), Elina Mikhina (W), Mikhail Litvin (M)	3:20.73	
5	China	He Ke (W), Yu Yang (M), Huang Guifen (W), Feng Zhiqiang (M)	3:21.51	
6	Tajikistan	Alisher Pulotov (M), Gulsumy Sharifova (W), Kristina Pronzhenko (W), Grigoriy Derepaskin (M)	3:27.35	
