= Prachi Choudhary =

Indian sprinter (born 1996)

Personal information
- Born: 20 December 1996 (age 29) Saharanpur, Uttar Pradesh, India

Sport
- Sport: Athletics
- Event: 400 m
Medal record
Women's athletics
Representing India
Asian Games
Gold medal – first place	2026 Aichi–Nagoya	4 × 400 m
Silver medal – second place	2022 Hangzhou	4 × 400 m
Bronze medal – third place	2026 Aichi–Nagoya	400 m
Asian Championships
Silver medal – second place	2019 Doha	4 × 400 m

Prachi Choudhary (born December 20, 1996) Indian sprinter who specialises in 400 m events. She has won silver medals in the 4 × 400 metres relay event at the 2019 Asian Championships and at the 2022 Asian Games. She was part of the Indian women's 4 × 400 m relay team at the Paris 2024 Olympics.
