= 2010 World Junior Championships in Athletics – Men's high jump =

The men's high jump event at the 2010 World Junior Championships in Athletics was held in Moncton, New Brunswick, Canada, at Moncton Stadium on 21 and 23 July.

== Medalists ==
Gold	Mutaz Issa Barshim; Qatar
Silver	David Smith; United States
Bronze	Naoto Tobe; Japan

== Results ==
=== Final ===
23 July

Rank	Name	Nationality	Result	Notes
1st place, gold medalist(s)	Mutaz Issa Barshim	Qatar	2.30	
2nd place, silver medalist(s)	David Smith	United States	2.24	
3rd place, bronze medalist(s)	Naoto Tobe	Japan	2.21	
4	Nikita Anishchenkov	Russia	2.21	
5	Jin Qichao	China	2.21	
6	Edgar Rivera	Mexico	2.17	
7	Carlos Layoy	Argentina	2.17	
7	Jarosław Rutkowski	Poland	2.17	
7	Erik Sundlöf	Sweden	2.17	
10	Janick Klausen	Denmark	2.17	
11	Branden Wilhelm	Canada	2.13	
12	Giuseppe Carollo	Italy	2.13	

=== Qualifications ===
21 July

==== Group A ====
Rank	Name	Nationality	Result	Notes
1	Mutaz Issa Barshim	Qatar	2.17	q
2	Nikita Anishchenkov	Russia	2.17	q
3	Naoto Tobe	Japan	2.17	q
4	Janick Klausen	Denmark	2.17	q
5	Carlos Layoy	Argentina	2.14	q
6	Edgar Rivera	Mexico	2.14	q
7	Viktor Fajoyomi	Hungary	2.14	
8	Artsiom Naumovich	Belarus	2.14	
9	Talles Silva	Brazil	2.14	
9	Douwe-Jorn Amels	Netherlands	2.14	
11	Mateusz Przybylko	Germany	2.10	
11	Maalik Reynolds	United States	2.10	
13	Sam Bailey	United Kingdom	2.10	
14	Vasileios Konstantinou	Cyprus	2.05	
15	Jonathan Reid	Jamaica	2.00	
15	Igor Hryhorov	Ukraine	2.00	
	Alexandr Khardin	Uzbekistan	NH	

==== Group B ====
Rank	Name	Nationality	Result	Notes
1	Jin Qichao	China	2.17	q
2	Erik Sundlöf	Sweden	2.17	q
2	David Smith	United States	2.17	q
4	Branden Wilhelm	Canada	2.17	q
5	Jarosław Rutkowski	Poland	2.17	q
6	Giuseppe Carollo	Italy	2.14	q
7	Adónios Mástoras	Greece	2.14	
8	Khalid Saeed Al-Saiari	Qatar	2.10	
9	Gianmarco Tamberi	Italy	2.10	
10	Hichem Krim	Algeria	2.10	
11	Andrey Kovalyov	Ukraine	2.10	
12	Django Lovett	Canada	2.10	
13	Daniil Tsiplakov	Russia	2.05	
14	Takashi Eto	Japan	2.05	
15	Raymond Higgs	Bahamas	2.00	
16	Robin Pál	Hungary	2.00	
	Hsiang Chun-Hsien	Chinese Taipei	NH	

== Participation ==
According to an unofficial count, 34 athletes from 26 countries participated in the event.

- Algeria (1)
- Argentina (1)
- Bahamas (1)
- Belarus (1)
- Brazil (1)
- Canada (2)
- China (1)
- Chinese Taipei (1)
- Cyprus (1)
- Denmark (1)
- Germany (1)
- Greece (1)
- Hungary (2)
- Italy (2)
- Jamaica (1)
- Japan (2)
- Mexico (1)
- Netherlands (1)
- Poland (1)
- Qatar (2)
- Russia (2)
- Sweden (1)
- Ukraine (2)
- United Kingdom (1)
- United States (2)
- Uzbekistan (1)
