= Konomi Takeishi =

Japanese sprinter

Personal information
- Nationality: Japanese
- Born: 9 October 1991 (age 35) Aizuwakamatsu, Japan
- Education: Fukushima University
- Height: 1.68 m (5 ft 6 in)
- Weight: 54 kg (119 lb)

Sport
- Country: Japan
- Sport: Track and field
- Events: 400 metres 400 metres hurdles
- Club: Toho Bank

Achievements and titles
- Personal bests: 400 m: 53.47 (Osaka 2017); 400 m hurdles: 58.29 (Osaka 2018)
Medal record
Women's athletics
Representing Japan
Asian Championships
Bronze medal – third place	2019 Doha	4×400 m relay
Bronze medal – third place	2019 Doha	Mixed 4×400 m relay

Konomi Takeishi (武石 この実, Takeishi Konomi; born 9 October 1991 in Aizuwakamatsu) is a Japanese sprinter who specialises in the 400 metres. She won the bronze medal in the women's 4 × 400 metres relay and mixed 4 × 400 metres relay at the 2019 Asian Championships. She also competed in the women's 4 × 400 metres relay at the 2019 World Relays. She is the former Japanese best record holder in the Mixed 4 × 400 metres relay (3:23.83 minutes).

== Personal bests ==
Event	Time	Competition	Venue	Date
400 m	53.47	Japanese Championships	Osaka, Japan	23 June 2017
400 m hurdles	58.29	Michitaka Kinami Memorial	Osaka, Japan	6 May 2018

=== Former Japanese best record holder ===
Event	Time	Competition	Venue	Date	Notes
Mixed 4 × 400 m relay	3:23.83 (relay leg: 1st) (Note: Fukushima select A team, with teammates Tomoharu Kino, Sayaka Aoki and Yoshiro Watanabe)	Fukushima Relays	Fukushima, Japan	14 October 2017	

== International competition ==
Year	Competition	Venue	Position	Event	Time
Representing Japan
2017	DécaNation	Angers, France	6th	400 m	54.78
2017	DécaNation	Angers, France	2nd	Mixed 4×400 m relay	3:27.88 (relay leg: 3rd)
2019	Asian Championships	Doha, Qatar	3rd	4×400 m relay	3:34.88 (relay leg: 3rd)
2019	Asian Championships	Doha, Qatar	3rd	Mixed 4×400 m relay	3:20.73 (relay leg: 2nd)
2019	World Relays	Yokohama, Japan	7th (B)	4×400 m relay	3:35.12 (relay leg: 3rd)

== National titles ==
- Japanese Championships
  - 4 × 100 m relay: 2014, 2020
  - 4 × 400 m relay: 2017, 2020
