= Maalik Reynolds =

American high jumper

Personal information
- Nationality: United States
- Born: April 27, 1992 (age 34) Atlanta, Georgia

Sport
- Sport: Track and field
- Event: High jump
- College team: Penn Quakers
Medal record
Men's athletics
Representing the United States
Pan American Junior Championships
Gold medal – first place	2011 Miramar	High jump
- Updated on 6 May 2012

Maalik Reynolds (born April 27, 1992) is an American high jumper.

== Education ==
Reynolds attended high school at The Westminster Schools in Atlanta, Georgia and graduated from the Wharton School of Business at the University of Pennsylvania in May 2014. He received a Bachelor of Science in Economics with a concentration in Management.

== Career ==
He jumps off his left foot. His personal best (outdoors) is 2.28 meters (7 ft-5.75in), achieved on May 7, 2011 at the Ivy League Outdoor Track and Field Championships, hosted by Yale University. His personal best (indoors) is 2.24 (7 ft-4.25in), achieved on February 7, 2014 at the Sykes & Sabock Challenge Cup at Penn State University. He was the winner at the 2011 Penn Relays with a jump of 2.22 m (7 ft 3 1/4 in). He was eighth at the NCAA Men's Indoor Track and Field Championship in 2012, having finished seventh in the previous year

== International competitions ==
Year	Competition	Venue	Position	Notes
Representing the United States
2010	World Junior Championships	Moncton, Canada	18th (q)	2.10 m
2011	Pan American Junior Championships	Miramar, United States	1st	2.22 m
