= 2023 Asian Athletics Championships – Women's 400 metres hurdles =

Women's 400 metres hurdles at the 2023 Asian Athletics Championships
- Venue: National Stadium
- Location: Bangkok, Thailand
- Dates: 15 July
- Competitors: 8 from 6 nations
- Winning time: 57.50

Medalists
gold medal	Robyn Lauren Brown	Philippines
silver medal	Farzaneh Fasihi	Japan
bronze medal	Ge Manqi	Japan

The women's 400 metres hurdles event at the 2023 Asian Athletics Championships was held on 15 July.

== Records ==
Records before the 2023 Asian Athletics Championships
Record	Athlete (nation)	Time (s)	Location	Date
World record	Sydney McLaughlin (USA)	50.68	Eugene, United States	22 July 2022
Asian record	Han Qing (CHN)	53.96	Lucerne, Switzerland	9 September 1993
Championship record	Kemi Adekoya (BHR)	54.31	Wuhan, China	6 June 2015
World leading	Femke Bol (NED)	52.30	Oslo, Norway	15 June 2023
Asian leading	Kemi Adekoya (BHR)	54.36	Algiers, Algeria	7 July 2023

== Results ==
Rank	Lane	Name	Nationality	Time	Notes
1st place, gold medalist(s)	5	Robyn Lauren Brown	Philippines	57.50	
2nd place, silver medalist(s)	6	Eri Utsunomiya	Japan	57.73	
3rd place, bronze medalist(s)	4	Ami Yamamoto	Japan	57.80	
4	3	Adelina Zems	Kazakhstan	57.91	
5	8	Nguyễn Thị Huyền	Vietnam	58.36	
6	7	Nurkhon Ochilova	Uzbekistan	1:00.69	PB
7	2	Ying Wen Ashleigh Ma	Hong Kong	1:02.17	
8	1	Veronika Loginova	Uzbekistan	1:02.79	
