= Athletics at the 2018 Asian Games – Women's 4 × 400 metres relay =

Women's 4 × 400 metres relay at the 2018 Asian Games
- Venue: Gelora Bung Karno Stadium
- Date: 30 August 2018
- Competitors: 32 from 8 nations

Medalists
gold medal	India; Hima Das, M. R. Poovamma, Sarita Gayakwad, V. K. Vismaya
silver medal	Bahrain; Aminat Yusuf Jamal, Iman Essa Jasim, Edidiong Odiong, Salwa Eid Naser
bronze medal	Vietnam; Nguyễn Thị Oanh, Nguyễn Thị Hằng, Hoàng Thị Ngọc, Quách Thị Lan

The women's 4 × 400 metres relay competition at the 2018 Asian Games took place on 30 August 2018 at the Gelora Bung Karno Stadium.

== Schedule ==
All times are Western Indonesia Time (UTC+07:00)

Date	Time	Event
Thursday, 30 August 2018	20:20	Final

== Records ==
Prior to this competition, the existing world, Asian and Games records were as follows.

World Record	Soviet Union	3:15.17	Seoul, South Korea	1 October 1988
Asian Record	China	3:24.28	Beijing, China	13 September 1993
Games Record	India	3:28.68	Incheon, South Korea	2 October 2014

== Results ==
Legend

- DSQ — Disqualified

Rank	Team	Time	Notes
1st place, gold medalist(s)	India (IND); Hima Das; M. R. Poovamma; Sarita Gayakwad; V. K. Vismaya	3:28.72	
2nd place, silver medalist(s)	Bahrain (BRN); Aminat Yusuf Jamal; Iman Essa Jasim; Edidiong Odiong; Salwa Eid Naser	3:30.61	
3rd place, bronze medalist(s)	Vietnam (VIE); Nguyễn Thị Oanh; Nguyễn Thị Hằng; Hoàng Thị Ngọc; Quách Thị Lan	3:33.23	
4	China (CHN); Liang Nuo; Cheng Chong; Pan Gaoqin; Huang Guifen	3:33.72	
5	Japan (JPN); Ayaka Kawata; Yume Kitamura; Eri Utsunomiya; Ayano Shiomi	3:34.14	
6	Kazakhstan (KAZ); Lyubov Ushakova; Margarita Mukasheva; Svetlana Golendova; Elina Mikhina	3:36.73	
7	Thailand (THA); Supanich Poolkerd; Arisa Weruwanarak; Phimmada Greeso; Rawiwan Pratike	3:47.89	
—	Indonesia (INA); Sri Maya Sari; Gusti Ayu Mardiliningsih; Ulfa Silpiana; Dewi Ayu Agung Kurniayanti	DSQ	
