= Ami Yamamoto =

Japanese hurdler

Personal information
- Born: 19 April 2002 (age 24) Shiga Prefecture, Japan
- Education: Ritsumeikan University

Sport
- Sport: Athletics
- Event: 400 m hurdles
Medal record
Women's Athletics
Representing Japan
Asian Championships
Bronze medal – third place	2023 Bangkok	400 m hurdles

Ami Yamamoto (山本 亜美, Yamamoto Ami; born 19 April 2002) is a Japanese athlete specialising in the 400 metres hurdles. She represented her country at the 2023 Asian Athletics Championships and the 2023 World Championships.

Her personal best in the event is 56.06 seconds set in Osaka in 2023. This is the current 5th place in Japan history.

== International competitions ==
Year	Competition	Venue	Position	Event	Notes
Representing Japan
2023	World University Games	Chengdu, China	5th	400 m hurdles	57.19
2023	World Championships	Budapest, Hungary	37th (h)	400 m hurdles	57.76
2023	Asian Games	Hangzhou, China	7th	400 m hurdles	57.66
2023	Asian Championships	Bangkok, Thailand	3rd	400 m hurdles	57.80
2025	Asian Championships	Gumi, South Korea	11th (h)	400 m hurdles	58.40

== National titles ==
- Japan Championships in Athletics
  - 400 m hurdles: 2021, 2022, 2023, 2024
