= Vithya Ramraj =

Indian athlete (born 1998)

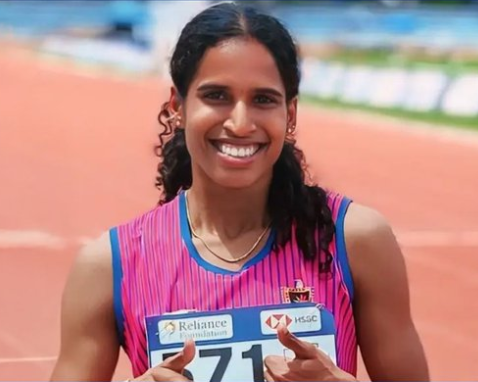
- Vithya at the 2024 National Championships

Personal information
- Born: 20 September 1998 (age 28) Coimbatore, Tamil Nadu, India

Sport
- Sport: Athletics
- Events: 400 m hurdles, 400 m

Achievements and titles
- Personal bests: 400 m hurdles: 54.75 NR (2026); 400 m: 52.25 (2024)
Medal record
Women's athletics
Representing India
Asian Games
Gold medal – first place	2026 Aichi–Nagoya	4 × 400 m relay
Silver medal – second place	2022 Hangzhou	4 × 400 m relay
Silver medal – second place	2022 Hangzhou	4 × 400 m mixed relay
Silver medal – second place	2026 Aichi–Nagoya	4 × 400 m mixed relay
Bronze medal – third place	2022 Hangzhou	400 m hurdles
Bronze medal – third place	2026 Aichi–Nagoya	400 m hurdles
Asian Championships
Bronze medal – third place	2025 Gumi	400 m hurdles

Vithya Ramraj (born 20 September 1998) is an Indian athlete who competes in the 400 m hurdles and 400 m events. At the 2026 Asian Games, she set a new national record of 54.75 seconds in 400 m hurdles, beating a long-standing record set by P. T. Usha at the 1984 Summer Olympics. She has won one gold, three silver, and two bronze medals at the Asian Games. She represented India in the women's 4 × 400 m relay at the 2024 Summer Olympics.

== Early and personal life ==
Vithya was born 20 September 1998, and hails from Coimbatore, Tamil Nadu. Her father is a truck driver. She is one of the three daughters to her parents, and has an identical twin, Nithya, who is also an athlete. The twins initially played field hockey at school and took up athletics when they joined the sports school at Erode for Class 7.

=== College career ===
Vithya was admitted to Kongu Arts and Science College, Erode, Tamil Nadu, where she pursued a Bachelor of Business Administration (BBA) degree from 2016 to 2019. During her college years, she was supported under the sports quota and received sponsorship from KVIT Trust.

During this period, she represented the college in national-level athletics competitions and All India Inter-University competitions. She won gold medals and achieved notable performances and records at national and university-level competitions.

Her development as an athlete was supported and encouraged by Dr. A. Sankar, Director of Physical Education at Kongu Arts and Science College, Erode, who provided guidance, motivation and support throughout her college career.She is employed by the Indian Railways.

== Career ==
During the early part of her career, Vithya focused on 100 and 200 metres sprints. However, in 2017, she switched to focus on the 400 metres and 400 metres hurdles. Since 2021, the twins are being trained by Nehpal Singh Rathore at the Jawaharlal Nehru Stadium in Chennai.

Both the sisters were part of the Indian contingent for the 2022 Asian Games. At the Asian Games, she won silver medals in the women's and mixed 4 × 400 metres relay events. In the 400 metres hurdles event, she won the bronze medal. During her bronze medal run, she equalled the Indian national record of 55.42 seconds set by P. T. Usha at the 1984 Summer Olympics. She was part of the Indian team that took part in the women's 4 × 400 metres relay at the 2024 Summer Olympics. At the 2026 Asian Games at Nagoya, she won the bronze medal in the 400 metres hurdles and set a new national record of 54.75 seconds during the race. She later won a gold medal in the women's 4 × 400 metres relay and a silver medal in the mixed 4 × 400 metres relay events.
