= Kota Wakabayashi =

Japanese sprinter

Personal information
- Nationality: Japanese
- Born: 23 October 1997 (age 28)

Sport
- Sport: Athletics
- Event: Sprinting

Achievements and titles
- Personal best(s): 200 m – 20.98 (2019); 400 m – 45.81 (2018)

Kota Wakabayashi (若林 康太, Wakabayashi Kōta; born 23 October 1997) is a Japanese athlete who specializes in the 400 metres run. He competed in the mixed 4 × 400 metres relay event at the 2019 World Athletics Championships.

Kota Wakabayashi gained his first international experience at the Asian Athletics Championships in Doha in 2019, where he won the gold medal with the Japanese 4 x 400 metre relay in 3:02.94 min and the bronze medal with the mixed relay in 3:20.29 min behind the teams from Bahrain and India.
