= Sinchal Kaveramma =

Indian athlete

Theetharamada Sinchal Kaveramma (born 5 February 2001) is an Indian athlete from Karnataka. She competes in 400m hurdles. She is named in the Indian athletics team for the 400m hurdles event in the 2022 Asian Games at Hangzhou, China.

== Early life ==
Kaveramma hails from Gonikoppa, Coorg district, Karnataka. She did her primary schooling at Lions Primary School in Gonikoppa before attending Alvas English Medium High School in Moodbidri. Later, after pre-university course at Alvas PU College, she is now doing her B.Com. at Bishop Cotton Women's Christian College in Bengaluru. She trains in Bengaluru.

== Career ==
- Kaveramma's personal best times: In June 2023, she set a new National record of 56.76s in the 400m hurdles at the 62nd Inter-State Athletics Championships at Kalinga Stadium, Bhubaneshwar. She clocked 3:36.50 in 4 × 400 m relay, her personal best at Gujarat in October 2022. Her other personal best in the 4 × 400 m relay mixed event came at Kalinga Stadium, Bhubaneshwar in June 2023.
- 2023: In October, she bagged gold medal in 400m hurdles in 62nd Open national championship in Bangalore. In June, she bagged a silver in the 400m hurdles at the Indian National Championships, Kalinga Stadium, Bhubaneshwar. She also got a bronze in the 4x400 metres mixed relay.
- 2022: In October, she won a silver at the National Open Athletics Championships, Sree Kanteerava Outdoor Stadium, Bengaluru.
- 2018: She won a silver medal in 400m hurdles at the Under-20 championships at Ranchi.
- 2017: She started her international career with Asian Youth Championships at Bangkok
