= 2011 Asian Athletics Championships – Men's high jump =

The Men's high jump event took place on July 9, 2011, at the Kobe Universiade Memorial Stadium.

== Medalists ==
| Gold | Mutaz Essa Barshim; Qatar |
| Silver | Majd Eddin Ghazal; Syria |
| Bronze | Wang Chen; China |

== Records ==
| World record | Javier Sotomayor (CUB) | 2.45 | Salamanca, Spain | 27 July 1993 |
| Asian record | Zhu Jianhua (CHN) | 2.39 | Eberstadt, Germany | 10 June 1984 |
| Championship record | Mutaz Essa Barshim (QAT) | 2.35 | Kobe, Japan | 2011 |

== Results ==
=== Final ===
| Rank | Name | Nationality | 2.00 | 2.05 | 2.10 | 2.15 | 2.18 | 2.21 | 2.24 | 2.26 | 2.28 | 2.33 | 2.35 | 2.38 | Notes |
|---|---|---|---|---|---|---|---|---|---|---|---|---|---|---|---|
| 1st place, gold medalist(s) | Mutaz Essa Barshim | Qatar | – | – | xo | o | o | o | o | o | o | o | xo | xx | CR, NR, PB |
| 2nd place, silver medalist(s) | Majd Eddin Ghazal | Syria | – | o | o | o | o | o | xo | xo | xxo | | | | NR |
| 3rd place, bronze medalist(s) | Wang Chen | China | – | o | o | o | o | o | o | xxo | xxx | | | | SB |
| 4 | Takashi Eto | Japan | – | – | – | o | xo | o | xxo | xxx | | | | | PB |
| 5 | Naoto Tobe | Japan | – | – | – | o | o | o | xxx | | | | | | |
| 6 | Keyvan Ghanbarzadeh | Iran | – | o | xo | o | o | xxx | | | | | | | |
| 7 | Hsiang Chun-Hsien | Chinese Taipei | o | o | xxo | o | xxo | xxx | | | | | | | |
| 8 | Rashid Ahmed Al-Mannai | Qatar | – | o | o | – | xxx | | | | | | | | |
| 8 | Zhang Guowei | China | – | – | o | o | – | xxx | | | | | | | |
| 10 | Yun Je-Hwan | South Korea | – | – | o | xxx | | | | | | | | | |
| 11 | Sergey Zasimovich | Kazakhstan | – | o | xo | xxx | | | | | | | | | |
| 12 | N.A.M. Alyami | Saudi Arabia | o | o | xxx | | | | | | | | | | |
| 13 | Chan Chi-shing | Hong Kong | o | xxx | | | | | | | | | | | |
| – | Lui Tsz Hin Daniel | Hong Kong | xxx | | | | | | | | | | | | NM |
