= Athletics at the 2018 Asian Games – Men's high jump =

Men's high jump at the 2018 Asian Games
- Venue: Gelora Bung Karno Stadium
- Date: 25–27 August 2018
- Competitors: 18 from 15 nations

Medalists
gold medal	Wang Yu	China
silver medal	Woo Sang-hyeok	South Korea
bronze medal	Majdeddin Ghazal	Syria
bronze medal	Naoto Tobe	Japan

The men's high jump competition at the 2018 Asian Games took place on 25 and 27 August 2018 at the Gelora Bung Karno Stadium.

== Schedule ==
All times are Western Indonesia Time (UTC+07:00)

Date	Time	Event
Saturday, 25 August 2018	10:30	Qualification
Monday, 27 August 2018	19:00	Final

== Records ==
Prior to this competition, the existing world, Asian and Games records were as follows.

World Record	Javier Sotomayor (CUB)	2.45	Salamanca, Spain	27 July 1993
Asian Record	Mutaz Barsham (QAT)	2.43	Brussels, Belgium	5 September 2014
Games Record	Mutaz Barsham (QAT)	2.35	Incheon, South Korea	29 September 2014

== Results ==
Legend

- NM — No mark
- r — Retired

=== Qualification ===
- Qualification: Qualifying performance 2.20 (Q) or at least 12 best performers (q) advance to the final.

Rank	Group	Athlete	Attempt					Result	Notes
Rank	Group	Athlete	1.95	2.00	2.05	2.10	2.15	Result	Notes
1	A	Bai Long (CHN)	–	–	O	O	O	2.15	q
1	A	Naoto Tobe (JPN)	–	–	–	O	O	2.15	q
1	A	Woo Sang-hyeok (KOR)	–	–	–	O	O	2.15	q
1	B	Takashi Eto (JPN)	–	–	–	O	O	2.15	q
1	B	Nauraj Singh Randhawa (MAS)	–	–	–	O	O	2.15	q
1	B	Wang Yu (CHN)	–	–	–	–	O	2.15	q
7	A	Hsiang Chun-hsien (TPE)	–	–	–	XO	O	2.15	q
7	B	Majdeddin Ghazal (SYR)	–	–	–	XO	O	2.15	q
9	A	Anton Bodnar (KAZ)	–	–	O	O	XO	2.15	q
9	A	Lee Hup Wei (MAS)	–	–	–	O	XO	2.15	q
9	B	Chethan Balasubramanya (IND)	–	–	O	O	XO	2.15	q
9	B	Hamdi Al-Amine (QAT)	–	–	O	O	XO	2.15	q
13	B	Dmitriy Melsitov (UZB)	–	–	O	O	XXO	2.15	q
14	A	Hussein Falah (IRQ)	O	–	O	O	XXX	2.10	
15	A	Rizky Ghusyafa Pratama (INA)	–	–	O	XXX		2.05	
15	B	Wong Chi Wai (MAC)	XXO	O	XO	XXX		2.05	
17	B	Yeung Hong To (HKG)	O	XXO	XXX			2.00	
—	A	Saksit Sittichai (THA)	–	XX–	X			NM	

=== Final ===
Rank	Athlete	Attempt										Result	Notes
Rank	Athlete	2.00	2.05	2.10	2.15	2.20	2.24	2.28	2.30	2.32	2.34	Result	Notes
1st place, gold medalist(s)	Wang Yu (CHN)	–	–	–	O	O	XO	O	O	X–	XX	2.30	
2nd place, silver medalist(s)	Woo Sang-hyeok (KOR)	–	–	–	O	O	XO	XO	X–	XX		2.28	
3rd place, bronze medalist(s)	Majdeddin Ghazal (SYR)	–	–	–	O	O	O	XXX				2.24	
3rd place, bronze medalist(s)	Naoto Tobe (JPN)	–	–	–	O	O	O	XXX				2.24	
5	Hamdi Al-Amine (QAT)	–	–	O	XO	XXO	O	XXX				2.24	
6	Takashi Eto (JPN)	–	–	O	O	XO	XXO	r				2.24	
7	Nauraj Singh Randhawa (MAS)	–	–	O	O	XXO	XXO	XXX				2.24	
8	Chethan Balasubramanya (IND)	–	–	O	O	O	XXX					2.20	
9	Dmitriy Melsitov (UZB)	–	–	XO	XO	O	XXX					2.20	
10	Lee Hup Wei (MAS)	–	–	O	O	XO	XXX					2.20	
11	Bai Long (CHN)	–	–	O	XXO	XXX						2.15	
12	Anton Bodnar (KAZ)	–	–	O	–	XXX						2.10	
—	Hsiang Chun-hsien (TPE)	–	–	–	XXX							NM	
