= Kiran Pahal =

Indian sprinter (born 2000)

Personal information
- Born: 5 August 2000 (age 26) Sonipat, Haryana, India

Sport
- Sport: Athletics
- Event: 400 m

Achievements and titles
- Personal best: 50.92 (2024)
Medal record
Women's athletics
Representing India
Asian Games
Gold medal – first place	2026 Aichi–Nagoya	4 × 400 m
Silver medal – second place	2026 Aichi–Nagoya	4 × 400 m mixed

Kiran Pahal (5 August 2000) is an Indian sprinter who specialises in 400 m events. She is the second athlete from India to go sub-51sec in 2024. She qualified for the 2024 Summer Olympics in Paris in 400 m. At Olympics, she clocked only 52.51 in the heats.

== Early life ==
Pahal is from Sonipat, Haryana. She has no sponsors and trains on her own in Haryana under her coach Ashissh Chhikara. After her father died, she has been having differences with her mother and siblings and trains on her own.

== Career ==
Pahal is a three time National champion. In June 2022, she won the 400 m individual event at the inter state championship at Jawaharlal Nehru Stadium, Chennai clocking 52.57. She was part of the 4 × 400 m relay teams that won the National title in October 2019 at Ranchi and June 2021 at Patiala. She also takes part in 100 m and 200 m but has been focussing on 400 m. She is ranked 139 in world rankings in 400 m.

She clocked 50.92s in 400 m in the semifinals at the National Inter-State Athletics Championships at Panchkula on 27 June 2024 to qualify for Olympics. The qualifying mark for Olympics was 50.95s. The Indian female athlete to take part in the 400 m at Olympics was Nirmal Sheoran at Rio Olympics in 2016.

In July 2025, she won the gold in the women's 400 m event at the Indian Open Athletics 2025 at Bihar.
