= V. K. Vismaya =

Indian sprinter

Personal information
- Full name: Velluva Koroth Vismaya
- Born: 14 May 1997 (age 29) Sreekandapuram, Kannur district, Kerala, India

Sport
- Country: India
- Sport: Track and field
- Event: 400 metres

Achievements and titles
- Personal bests: 400 m - 52.12 (2019)
Medal record
Representing India
Asian Games
Gold medal – first place	2018 Jakarta	Women's 4×400 m
Asian Championships
Silver medal – second place	2019 Doha	Women's 4×400 m
Silver medal – second place	2019 Doha	Mixed 4×400 m

Velluva Koroth Vismaya (born 14 May 1997) is an Indian athlete from Kerala who specializes in the 400 metres. She was part of the gold-winning Indian team at the 2018 Asian Games.

== Early life and education ==
Vismaya hails from Sreekandapuram in Kannur district, Kerala. Her father is a construction labourer. She started athletics late only at the age of 11. She is a B.Sc. Mathematics graduate.

== Career ==
Vismaya was part of the Indian women's 4 × 400 metres relay team that won the gold medal at the 2018 Asian Games. At the 2019 Asian Athletics Championships, she won silver in the women's 4 x 400 metres relay and silver in the mixed 4 x 400 metres relay. The quartet of Vismaya, Muhammed Anas, Noah Nirmal Tom and Jisna Mathew competed in the 4 × 400 metres mixed team relay at the 2019 World Athletics Championships in Doha, where they clocked 3:16.14 in the heats to qualify for the final and secured a place at the 2020 Summer Olympics..The team finished seventh in the finals of the world athletics championships with a timing of 3:15: 77.

=== Domestic ===
She won the gold medal in 400m at the 59th National Open Athletics Championships held in October 2019.
