= Adelina Zems =

Kazakhstani hurdler (born 1998)

Personal information
- Born: 25 December 1998 (age 27) Karaganda, Kazakhstan
- Height: 1.63 m (5 ft 4 in)
- Weight: 54 kg (119 lb)

Sport
- Sport: Athletics
- Event: 400 metres hurdles
- Coached by: Denisko Alexandr Viktorovich
Medal record
Women's athletics
Representing Kazakhstan
Asian Indoor Championships
Gold medal – first place	2018 Tehran	4 × 400 m
Gold medal – first place	2023 Astana	4 × 400 m
Gold medal – first place	2024 Tehran	4 × 400 m
Gold medal – first place	2026 Tianjin	4 × 400 m

Adelina Zems (Cyrillic: Аделина Земс; born 25 December 1998) is a Kazakhstani athlete specialising in the 400 metres hurdles. 3 times Asian Champion at the relay medley 4 × 400 m Bronze Medalists At the Asian Games 2023 She represented her country in the 4 × 400 metres relay at the 2018 World Indoor Championships without reaching the final.

== International competitions ==
Year	Competition	Venue	Position	Event	Notes
Representing Kazakhstan
2015	Asian Youth Championships	Doha, Qatar	3rd	400 m hurdles	63.27
2015	Asian Youth Championships	Doha, Qatar	2nd	Medley relay	2:17.72
2015	World Youth Championships	Cali, Colombia	26th (h)	400 m hurdles	65.79
2016	Asian Junior Championships	Ho Chi Minh City, Vietnam	8th	400 m hurdles	62.52
2016	Asian Junior Championships	Ho Chi Minh City, Vietnam	4th	4 × 400 m relay	3:55.08
2016	World U20 Championships	Bydgoszcz, Poland	37th (h)	400 m hurdles	62.24
2017	Asian Championships	Bhubaneswar, India	8th	400 m hurdles	61.60
2017	Asian Championships	Bhubaneswar, India	4th	4 × 400 m relay	3:37.95
2018	Asian Indoor Championships	Tehran, Iran	1st	4 × 400 m relay	3:41.67
2018	World Indoor Championships	Birmingham, United Kingdom	9th (h)	4 × 400 m relay	3:40.54
2018	Asian Games	Jakarta, Indonesia	10th (h)	400 m hurdles	60.08
2019	Asian Championships	Doha, Qatar	5th	400 m hurdles	57.92
2019	Universiade	Naples, Italy	23rd (h)	400 m hurdles	61.97
2023	Asian Indoor Championships	Astana, Kazakhstan	7th (h)	400 m	55.89
2023	Asian Indoor Championships	Astana, Kazakhstan	1st	4 × 400 m relay	3:44.21
2023	Asian Championships	Bangkok, Thailand	4th	400 m hurdles	57.91
2023	World University Games	Chengdu, China	10th (sf)	400 m hurdles	58.08
2023	Asian Games	Hangzhou, China	8th	400 m hurdles	60.27
2024	Asian Indoor Championships	Tehran, Iran	1st	4 × 400 m relay	3:41.08
2025	Asian Championships	Gumi, South Korea	4th	400 m hurdles	56.73
2025	Islamic Solidarity Games	Riyadh, Saudi Arabia	4th	400 m hurdles	58.67
2026	Asian Indoor Championships	Tianjin, China	4th	400 m	54.82
2026	Asian Indoor Championships	Tianjin, China	1st	4 × 400 m relay	3:38.02

== Personal bests ==
Outdoors

- 400 metres – 56.39 (Almaty 2017)
- 400 metres hurdles – 56.86 (Nairobi, Kenya)

Indoors

- 400 metres – 55.21 (Astana 2023)
