= Mo Jiadie =

Chinese athlete (born 2000)

Personal information
- Nationality: Chinese
- Born: 6 January 2000 (age 26) Zhaoqing, Guangdong, China

Sport
- Sport: Athletics
- Event: Hurdles

Achievements and titles
- Personal bests: 400m hurdles: 54.63 (Tokyo, 2025)
Medal record
Women's athletics
Representing China
Asian Games
Silver medal – second place	2022 Hangzhou	400m hurdles
Asian Championships
Gold medal – first place	2025 Gumi	400m hurdles

Mo Jiadie (Chinese: 莫家蝶, pinyin: Mò Jiādié; born 6 January 2000) is a Chinese 400m hurdler. She is a multiple time national champion and a silver medalist at the 2022 Asian Games.

== Career ==
She competed at the 2018 World Athletics U20 Championships in Tampere. She became Chinese champion over 400m hurdles for the first time in 2019. She retained her title at the 2020 Chinese Athletics Championships in September 2020 in Shaoxing.

She competed at the 2022 World Athletics Championships in the Women's 400 metres hurdles in Eugene, Oregon.

She won the 2023 Chinese Athletics Championships over 400 metres hurdles in July 2023. She won a silver medal at the delayed 2022 Asian Games in the Women's 400 metres hurdles, running 55.01 seconds.

She won the Chinese national title again in June 2024. She competed in the 400 metres hurdles at the 2024 Summer Olympics in Paris in August 2024, where she reached the semi-finals.

She competed at the 2025 World Athletics Relays in China in the Mixed 4 × 400 metres relay in May 2025.

Selected for the 2025 World Athletics Championships in Tokyo, she ran on the opening day in the mixed 4 × 400 metres relay. She then reached the semi-finals of the 400 metres hurdles with a personal best time of 54.63 seconds, but did not advance to the final. On 17 November 2025, she won the 400 metres hurdles title at the 2025 National Games of China in Guangzhou.
