= Naoto Tobe =

Japanese high jumper (born 1992)

Personal information
- Born: 31 March 1992 (age 34) Noda, Chiba Prefecture
- Education: University of Tsukuba
- Height: 1.94 m (6 ft 4 in)
- Weight: 74 kg (163 lb)

Sport
- Country: Japan
- Sport: Track and field
- Event: High jump
Medal record
Asian Games
Bronze medal – third place	2018 Jakarta–Palembang	High jump
Asian Championships
Bronze medal – third place	2019 Doha	High jump
World Junior Championships
Bronze medal – third place	2010 Moncton	High jump
- Updated on 29 August 2015

Naoto Tobe (戸邉 直人, Tobe Naoto; born 31 March 1992) is a Japanese high jumper. He competed at the 2015 World Championships in Beijing without qualifying for the final.

His personal bests in the event are 2.32 metres outdoors (Lignano Sabbiadoro 2018) and 2.35 metres indoors (Karlsruhe 2019).

Tobe received a PhD degree in Sport science from the University of Tsukuba in 2019.

== Competition record ==
Year	Competition	Venue	Position	Notes
Representing Japan
2008	World Junior Championships	Bydgoszcz, Poland	10th	2.08 m
2010	World Junior Championships	Moncton, Canada	3rd	2.21 m
2011	Asian Championships	Kobe, Japan	5th	2.21 m
2011	Universiade	Shenzhen, China	26th (q)	2.00 m
2013	Universiade	Kazan, Russia	9th	2.20 m
2014	Asian Games	Incheon, South Korea	5th	2.25 m
2015	World Championships	Beijing, China	25th (q)	2.26 m
2018	Asian Games	Jakarta, Indonesia	3rd	2.24 m
2019	Asian Championships	Doha, Qatar	3rd	2.26 m
2019	World Championships	Doha, Qatar	14th (q)	2.26 m
2021	Olympic Games	Tokyo, Japan	13th	2.24 m
2022	World Indoor Championships	Belgrade, Serbia	12th	2.15 m
