= Mariam Kareem =

Emirati sprinter (born 2008)

Personal information
- Born: 25 January 2008 (age 18)

Sport
- Sport: Athletics
- Events: Sprint, Hurdles
Medal record
Women's athletics
Representing United Arab Emirates
Asian Games
| Gold medal – first place | 2026 Nagoya | 400 m hurdles |
Islamic Solidarity Games
| Silver medal – second place | 2025 Riyadh | 400 m hurdles |
Asian U20 Championships
| Gold medal – first place | 2026 Hong Kong | 400 m hurdles |
Asian U18 Athletics Championships
| Gold medal – first place | 2025 Dammam | 200 m |
| Gold medal – first place | 2025 Dammam | 400 m hurdles |

Mariam Kareem (born 25 January 2008) is an Emirati sprinter and hurdler. She won the gold medal in the 400 metres hurdles at the 2026 Asian Games and represented the United Arab Emirates at the 2024 Olympic Games.

== Biography ==
Kareem represented the United Arab Emirates in the 100 metres at the 2024 Olympic Games in Paris, running a personal best 13.26 seconds without advancing from the preliminary heats. In September 2024, she set a national junior record of 24.30 seconds in the 200 metres at the Arab Junior Athletics Championship (under 18), held in Taif, Saudi Arabia. She also won the 100 m title at the same championships.

In April 2025, she won two gold medals with victories in the 200 m and 400 m hurdles races at the 2025 Asian U18 Athletics Championships in Saudi Arabia. She was subsequently named Best Asian Under-18 Female Athlete at the 2025 Asian Athletics Awards. The following month, she placed eighth in the 400 metres hurdles final at the 2025 Asian Athletics Championships in Gumi, South Korea. In September 2025, she set a new personal best of 57.66 seconds for the 400 metres hurdles to take a world under-18 lead. In November 2025, she won the 400 m hurdles silver medal at the 2025 Islamic Solidarity Games, running 57.42 seconds in the final.

In August 2026, she was a finalist in the 400 metres hurdles at the 2026 World Athletics U20 Championships in the United States. In September, Kareem won the 400 m hurdles gold medal at the 2026 Asian Games in Aichi-Nagoya, Japan 2026, winning the women's title in 54.31 seconds, to set a new Asian Games record. The time also improved the Asian U20 record and moved her to second on the world U20 all-time list behind only Sydney McLaughlin-Levrone.
