= Lauren Hoffman (hurdler) =

Filipino-American hurdler and sprinter (born 1999)

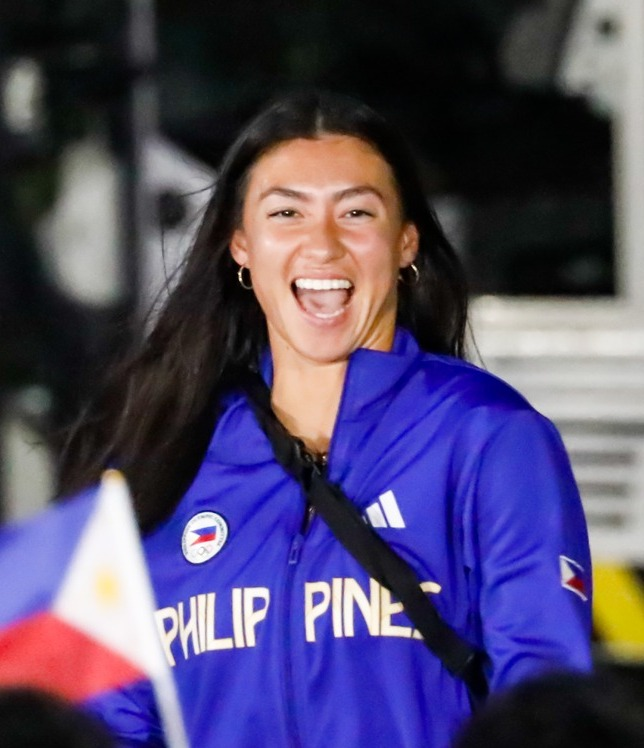
- Hoffman in 2024

Personal information
- Born: March 30, 1999 (age 27) Virginia, U.S.
- Home town: Haymarket, Virginia, U.S.
- Education: Duke University

Sport
- Country: Philippines
- Sport: Track
- Events: Hurdles and sprints
Medal record
Women's athletics
Representing Philippines
SEA Games
Bronze medal – third place	2025 Thailand	400m hurdles
Bronze medal – third place	2025 Thailand	Women's 4x400m Relay

Lauren Alexis Hoffman (born March 30, 1999) is a Filipino hurdler and sprinter. She has represented the Philippines at the 2024 Summer Olympics in Paris, France.

Hoffman made her debut with the Philippine national team at the 2022 Asian Games in Hangzhou, China which was postponed to October 2023.

She has represented Duke University at the NCAA, where she won bronze at the 2022 NCAA Track and Field Championships.

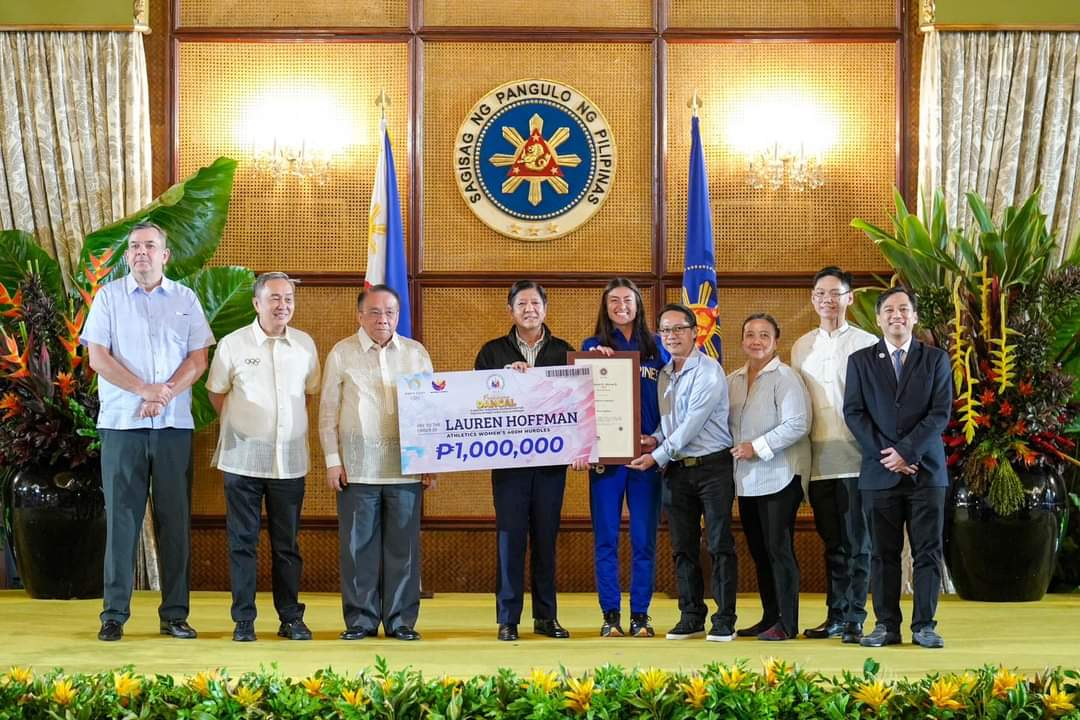
President Bongbong Marcos honors 2024 Filipino Olympians; Hoffman is in blue, centered
