= 2019 Asian Athletics Championships =

2019 Asian Championships
- Dates: 21–24 April
- Host city: Doha, Qatar
- Venue: Khalifa International Stadium
- Events: 43
- Participation: 595 athletes from 43 nations

The 2019 Asian Athletics Championships was the 23rd edition of the Asian Athletics Championships. It was held from 21 to 24 April 2019 at the Khalifa International Stadium in Doha, Qatar. During the closing ceremony of the 22nd Asian Athletics Championships in Bhubaneswar India, President of Asian Athletics Association (AAA) Dahlan Al Hamad officially handed over the AAA Flag to Qatar Olympic Committee Secretary-General and Qatar Athletics Federation President Thani Abdulrahman Al Kuwari. The event was at the Khalifa International Stadium and it served as the test event for the 2019 World Athletics Championships which were held at the same venue.

== Medal summary ==
=== Men ===
Event	Gold		Silver		Bronze	
100 metres	Yoshihide Kiryū; Japan	10.10	Lalu Muhammad Zohri; Indonesia	10.13 NR	Wu Zhiqiang; China	10.18 PB
200 metres	Xie Zhenye; China	20.33	Yuki Koike; Japan	20.55	Yaqoob Eid Salem; Bahrain	20.84
400 metres	Yousef Karam; Kuwait	44.84 NR	Abbas Abubakar Abbas; Bahrain	45.14 PB	Mikhail Litvin; Kazakhstan	45.25 NR
800 metres	Abubaker Haydar Abdalla; Qatar	1:44.33 PB, WL	Ebrahim Al-Zofairi; Kuwait	1:46.88 SB	Jamal Hairane; Qatar	1:47.27
1500 metres	Abraham Rotich; Bahrain	3:42.85 SB	Ajay Kumar Saroj; India	3:43.18(.174) SB	Adam Ali Mousab; Qatar	3:43.18(.180) SB
5000 metres	Birhanu Balew; Bahrain	13:37.42	Albert Rop; Bahrain	13:37.57	Hiroki Matsueda; Japan	13:45.44
10,000 metres	Dawit Fikadu; Bahrain	28:26.30 PB	Hassan Chani; Bahrain	28:31.30 SB	Gavit Murli Kumar; India	28:38.34 PB
110 metres hurdles	Xie Wenjun; China	13.21 CR, PB, WL	Yaqoub Al-Youha; Kuwait	13.35 NR	Chen Kuei-ru; Chinese Taipei	13.39 =NR
400 metres hurdles	Abderrahman Samba; Qatar	47.51 CR, WL	Chen Chieh; Chinese Taipei	48.92 PB	Jabir Madari Palliyalil; India	49.13 PB
3000 metres steeplechase	John Kibet Koech; Bahrain	8:25.87 WL	Avinash Sable; India	8:30.19	Kazuya Shiojiri; Japan	8:32.25
4×100 metres relay	Thailand (THA); Ruttanapon Sowan; Bandit Chuangchai; Jirapong Meenapra; Siripol Punpa	38.99	Chinese Taipei (TPE); Wei Yi-ching; Wang Wei-hsu; Yang Chun-han; Lin Hung-min	39.18 SB	Oman (OMA); Mohamed Al-Balushi; Barakat Al-Harthi; Mohamed Obaid Al-Saadi; Ammar Al-Saifi	39.36 NR
4×400 metres relay	Japan (JPN); Julian Walsh; Kentaro Sato; Rikuya Itō; Kota Wakabayashi	3:02.94	China (CHN); Lu Zhiquan; Wu Lei; Yang Lei; Wu Yuang	3:03.55 NR	Qatar (QAT); Ashraf Hussen Osman; Abubaker Haydar Abdalla; Bassem Hemeida; Abderrahman Samba	3:03.95
High jump	Majd Eddin Ghazal; Syria	2.31 m =WL	Takashi Eto; Japan	2.29 m	Naoto Tobe; Japan	2.26 m
Pole vault	Ernest John Obiena; Philippines	5.71 m CR, NR	Zhang Wei; China	5.66 m PB	Huang Bokai; China	5.66 m SB
Long jump	Yuki Hashioka; Japan	8.22 m PB, =WL	Zhang Yaoguang; China	8.13 m SB	Huang Changzhou; China	7.97 m SB
Triple jump	Ruslan Kurbanov; Uzbekistan	16.93 m PB	Zhu Yaming; China	16.87 m *SB	Xu Xiaolong; China	16.81 m
Shot put	Tejinder Pal Singh Toor; India	20.22 m SB	Wu Jiaxing; China	20.03 m PB	Ivan Ivanov; Kazakhstan	19.09 m
Discus throw	Ehsan Haddadi; Iran	65.95 m CR	Behnam Shiri; Iran	60.89 m	Musaeb Al-Momani; Jordan	58.27 m SB
Hammer throw	Dilshod Nazarov; Tajikistan	76.14 m SB	Ashraf Amgad El-Seify; Qatar	73.76 m	Suhrob Khodjaev; Uzbekistan	72.85 m
Javelin throw	Cheng Chao-tsun; Chinese Taipei	86.72 m CR, WL	Shivpal Singh; India	86.23 m PB	Ryohei Arai; Japan	81.93 m
Decathlon	Keisuke Ushiro; Japan	7872 pts SB	Majed Radhi Al-Sayed; Kuwait	7838 pts NR	Akihiko Nakamura; Japan	7837 pts SB

=== Women ===
Event	Gold		Silver		Bronze	
100 metres	Olga Safronova; Kazakhstan	11.17 CR, SB	Liang Xiaojing; China	11.28	Wei Yongli; China	11.37
200 metres	Salwa Eid Naser; Bahrain	22.74 CR, PB	Olga Safronova; Kazakhstan	22.87 SB	Dutee Chand; India	23.24 SB
400 metres	Salwa Eid Naser; Bahrain	51.34 SB	Elina Mikhina; Kazakhstan	53.19 SB	M. R. Poovamma; India	53.21
800 metres	Wang Chunyu; China	2:02.96 SB	Margarita Mukasheva; Kazakhstan	2:03.83 SB	Gayanthika Abeyratne; Sri Lanka	2:05.74
1500 metres	P. U. Chitra; India	4:14.56	Tigist Gashaw; Bahrain	4:14.81	Winfred Yavi; Bahrain	4:16.18 SB
5000 metres	Winfred Mutile Yavi; Bahrain	15:28.87 PB	Bontu Rebitu; Bahrain	15:29.60 SB	Parul Chaudhary; India	15:36.03 PB
10,000 metres	Shitaye Habtegebrel; Bahrain	31:15.62 CR, SB	Hitomi Niiya; Japan	31:22.63 SB	Sanjivani Jadhav; India	32:44.96 PB
100 metres hurdles	Ayako Kimura; Japan	13.13	Chen Jiamin; China	13.24 PB	Masumi Aoki; Japan	13.28
400 metres hurdles	Quách Thị Lan; Vietnam	56.10 SB	Aminat Yusuf Jamal; Bahrain	56.39 SB	Sarita Gayakwad; India	57.22
3000 metres steeplechase	Winfred Yavi; Bahrain	9:46.18 SB	Xu Shuangshuang; China	9:51.76 SB	Tigest Mekonen; Bahrain	9:53.96 SB
4×100 metres relay	China (CHN); Liang Xiaojing; Wei Yongli; Kong Lingwei; Ge Manqi	42.87 CR, WL	Kazakhstan (KAZ); Rima Kashafutdinova; Elina Mikhina; Svetlana Golendova; Olga Safronova	43.36	Bahrain (BHR); Edidiong Odiong; Iman Essa Jassim; Hajar Al-Khaldi; Salwa Eid Naser	43.61
4×400 metres relay	Bahrain (BHR); Aminat Yusuf Jamal; Iman Essa Jassim; Zainab Mohammed; Salwa Eid Naser	3:32.10 SB	India (IND); Prachi Choudhary; M. R. Poovamma; Sarita Gayakwad; V. K. Vismaya	3:32.21 SB	Japan (JPN); Mae Hirosawa; Seika Aoyama; Konomi Takeishi; Yuna Iwata	3:34.88 SB
High jump	Nadiya Dusanova; Uzbekistan	1.90 m	Nadezhda Dubovitskaya; Kazakhstan	1.88 m PB	Svetlana Radzivil; Uzbekistan	1.88 m
Pole vault	Li Ling; China	4.61 m SB	Xu Huiqin; China	4.36 m SB	Natalie Uy; Philippines	4.20 m
Long jump	Lu Minjia; China	6.38 m SB	Ayaka Kora; Japan	6.16 m	Yue Ya Xin; Hong Kong	6.15 m
Triple jump	Parinya Chuaimaroeng; Thailand	13.72 m SB	Zeng Rui; China	13.65 m	Vidusha Lakshani; Sri Lanka	13.53 m SB
Shot put	Gong Lijiao; China	19.18 m SB	Noora Salem Jasim; Bahrain	18.00 m NR	Song Jiayuan; China	17.70 m
Discus throw	Feng Bin; China	65.36 m CR, PB	Chen Yang; China	61.87 m SB	Subenrat Insaeng; Thailand	58.20 m SB
Hammer throw	Wang Zheng; China	75.66 m CR, SB	Luo Na; China	72.23 m	Akane Watanabe; Japan	63.54 m
Javelin throw	Lü Huihui; China	65.83 m CR	Annu Rani; India	60.22 m	Natta Nachan; Thailand	56.01 m PB
Heptathlon	Yekaterina Voronina; Uzbekistan	6198 pts WL	Swapna Barman; India	5993 pts SB	Wang Qingling; China	5829 pts SB

=== Mixed ===
Event	Gold		Silver		Bronze	
4×400 metres relay	Bahrain (BHR); Musa Isah; Aminat Yusuf Jamal; Salwa Eid Naser; Abbas Abubakar Abbas	3:15.75	India (IND); Mohammad Anas; M. R. Poovamma; Vismaya Velluvakoroth; Arokia Rajiv	3:16.47	Japan (JPN); Kota Wakabayashi; Konomi Takeishi; Mayu Inaoka; Kentaro Sato	3:20.29

== Medal table ==
* Host nation (Qatar)

Rank	Nation	Gold	Silver	Bronze	Total
1	Bahrain (BHR)	11	7	4	22
2	China (CHN)	10	12	7	29
3	Japan (JPN)	5	4	9	18
4	Uzbekistan (UZB)	3	0	2	5
5	India (IND)	2	7	7	16
6	Qatar (QAT)*	2	1	3	6
7	Thailand (THA)	2	0	2	4
8	Kazakhstan (KAZ)	1	5	2	8
9	Kuwait (KUW)	1	3	0	4
10	Chinese Taipei (TPE)	1	2	1	4
11	Iran (IRI)	1	1	0	2
12	Philippines (PHI)	1	0	1	2
13	Syria (SYR)	1	0	0	1
13	Tajikistan (TJK)	1	0	0	1
13	Vietnam (VIE)	1	0	0	1
16	Indonesia (INA)	0	1	0	1
17	Sri Lanka (SRI)	0	0	2	2
18	Hong Kong (HKG)	0	0	1	1
18	Jordan (JOR)	0	0	1	1
18	Oman (OMA)	0	0	1	1
Totals (20 entries)		43	43	43	129

== Participating nations ==
- Bahrain (28)
- Bangladesh (5)
- Bhutan (2)
- Brunei (1)
- Cambodia (2)
- China (84)
- Chinese Taipei (22)
- Hong Kong (17)
- India (38)
- Indonesia (9)
- Iran (16)
- Iraq (9)
- Japan (74)
- Jordan (4)
- Kazakhstan (24)
- Kuwait (18)
- Kyrgyzstan (11)
- Laos (3)
- Lebanon (4)
- Macau (5)
- Malaysia (9)
- Maldives (7)
- Myanmar (1)
- Nepal (2)
- North Korea (2)
- Oman (9)
- Pakistan (5)
- Palestine (4)
- Philippines (13)
- Qatar (33)
- Saudi Arabia (9)
- Singapore (15)
- South Korea (22)
- Sri Lanka (15)
- Syria (2)
- Tajikistan (6)
- Thailand (23)
- Timor-Leste (2)
- Turkmenistan (5)
- Uzbekistan (15)
- Vietnam (12)
- Yemen (8)
